= 1901–02 Athletic Bilbao season =

1st season in existence of Athletic Bilbao

Athletic Club/Club Bizcaya
1901–02 season
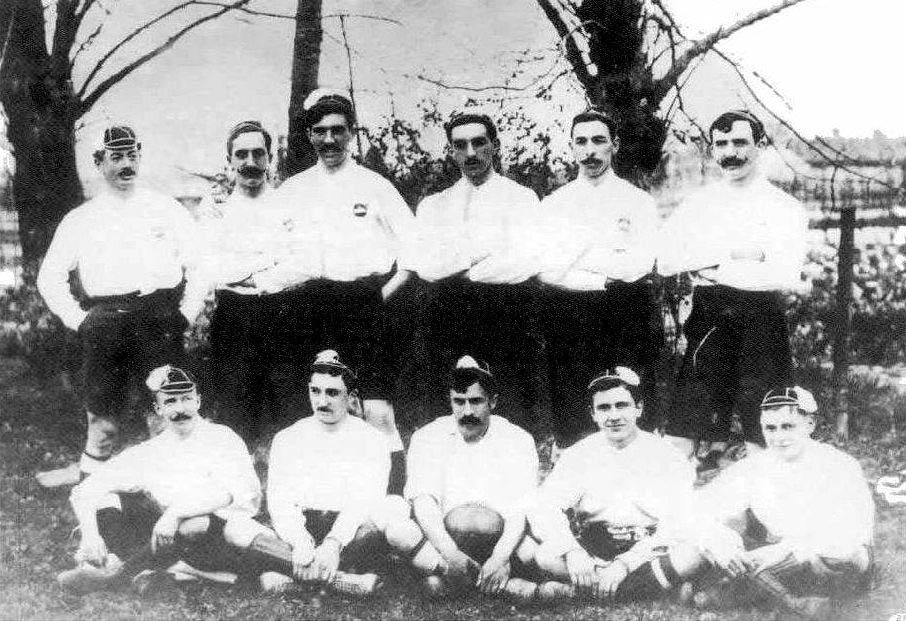
- Athletic Bilbao team in 1902.
- President: Luis Márquez
- Manager: No manager
- Stadium: Hippodrome of Lamiako
- Copa de la Coronación: Champions
- Top goalscorer: League: All: Walter Evans; William Dyer (5 goals each)
- Biggest win: Athletic Club 8–1 New Foot-Ball Club
- Biggest defeat: Athletic Club 2–3 Athletic Bilbao
Home colours

The 1901–02 season was Athletic Club's 1st season in existence. The club played some friendly matches against local clubs such as Bilbao FC. Athletic also played their first match outside of the Basque Country against Club Español (now RCD Espanyol) at the Copa de la Coronación in Madrid.

== Summary ==
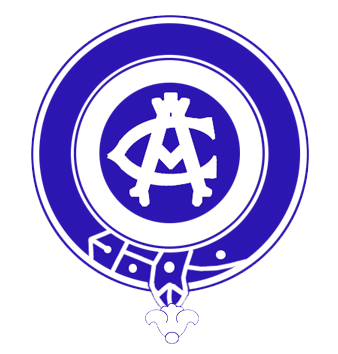
Athletic Club first crest is adopted in 1902.

- 11 June: The club's Board was then elected, with Luis Márquez being appointed the first president of the club, Francisco Íñiguez as vice-president, José María Barquín as treasurer and Enrique Goiri as its secretary, while Juan Astorquia and Alfred Mills were named the team's captain and vice-captain respectively. Since the figure of coach as we know it today did not exist at the time, it was Astorquia and Mills, as captain of the clubs, who was in charge of making up the line-ups and dictating the tactics to be followed. The most logical name for a new football club founded in Bilbao (Bilbao Football Club) was already "taken", so the name they chose was Athletic Club, using the English spelling. The name is an apparent homage to the Club Atleta of the Nervión Shipyards (1889–94).
- 5 September: The club is officially established after obtaining the permission of the Civil Government. In the infamous meeting held at Café García, 33 members signed the documents to make it official and register as a sports organization with the local council. In addition to the 7 original founders of 1898, Juan Astorquia, Alejandro Acha, Luis Márquez, Fernando and Pedro Iraolagoitia, Enrique Goiri and Eduardo Montejo; that group also included the likes of Alejandro de la Sota, Amado Arana, the Silva brothers (Ramón and Luis), Juan Astorquia's brother, Luis, Antonio Zubillaga, and Alfred Mills, who was the only foreign-born person among the 33 who signed the documents.
- Early November: Since there were hardly any fields in Bilbao, the two sides agreed to share the Hippodrome of Lamiako, which they rented together. Lamiako was thus the home to one of the first great rivalries in the history of Spanish football.
- 10 November: Athletic Club played its first-ever match against another club in a friendly against Bilbao FC at the Hippodrome of Lamiako. It ended in a 0–0 draw.
- 16 November: Athletic Club played its first-ever international match at Lamiako against English Mariners XI, which is the crew of either a British warship or a merchant ship, winning 2–1.
- 19 January 1902: Athletic Club secured its first-ever win after beating Bilbao FC 4–2 with goals from Juan Astorquia (2), Ramón Silva and Mario Arana. It was also the first time that a paid match was held in Vizcaya, since this time they charged a ticket price of 30 cents of a peseta.
- Early-March: The two rivals agreed to join the best players of each club to play two games against the Bordeaux-based side Burdigala. This temporary merge became known as Club Bizcaya.
- 9 March: Bizcaya played its first match on foreign territory, winning 2–0 in Buerdos, France with goals from Ramón Silva and Walter Evans.
- 31 March: Bizcaya played the return fixture at home, the very first visit by a foreign team to Bilbao, trashing the French side with a resounding 7–0 victory with a poker from William Dyer and a hat-trick from Juan Astorquia. Lamiako had its record attendance on that day, gathering a crowd of three thousand spectators, a tremendous amount at the time.
- 13 May: Athletic Club played its first competitive match in the Copa de la Coronación and also secured its first competitive victory with a 5–1 win over Club Español (now RCD Espanyol). Juan Astorquia scored the club's first competitive goal, William Dyer scored the club's first competitive penalty and Walter Evans scored the club's first competitive hat-trick.
- 14 May: Athletic Club trashes New Foot-Ball Club in the semi-finals of the Copa de la Coronación with a resounding 8–1 victory, with a poker from Bilbao FC's William Dyer, two goals from Walter Evans of Bilbao FC and a goal each from Astorquia and Raymond Cazeaux, both of Athletic.
- 15 May: Athletic Club wins its first-ever piece of silverware after a 2–1 win over FC Barcelona in the final, courtesy of Astorquia and Cazeaux. The trophy was presented by the mayor of Madrid and Bizcaya returned to Bilbao with it. Athletic still has that trophy in their trophy room at the San Mamés stadium.

== Squad ==
Note: Flags indicate national team as defined under FIFA eligibility rules; some limited exceptions apply. Players may hold more than one non-FIFA nationality.

No.	Pos.	Nation	Player
—	GK	ESP	Alejandro Acha (First club)
—	GK	ESP	Luis Arana (Bilbao FC)
—	DF	ESP	Enrique Careaga (Bilbao FC)
—	DF	ESP	Perico Larrañaga (Athletic de Portugalete)
—	DF	ESP	Alfred Mills (First club)
—	MF	ESP	Enrique Goiri (First club)
—	MF	ESP	Ricardo Ugalde (Bilbao FC)
—	MF	ESP	Gregorio Eguren (First club)
—	MF	ESP	Luis Silva (First club)
—	DF	ESP	Pedro Iraolagoitia (First club)
—	DF	ESP	José Maria Arana (First club)
—	MF	ESP	Amado Arana (First club)

No.	Pos.	Nation	Player
—	FW	ESP	Mario Arana (First club)
—	FW	ESP	(First club)
—	FW	FRA	Raymond Cazeaux (First club)
—	FW	ESP	Eduardo Montejo (First club)
—	FW	ESP	Antonio Zubillaga (First club)
—	FW	ESP	José Maria Barquín (First club)
—	FW	ESP	Ramón Silva (First club)
—	FW	ESP	Alejandro de la Sota (First club)
—	FW	ENG	Walter Evans (Bilbao FC)
—	FW	ENG	William Dyer (Bilbao FC)
—	FW	ESP	Juan Astorquia (First club)

== Results ==
Athletic Club

10 November 1901	Athletic Club	0 – 0	Bilbao FC	Leioa, Basque Country
	?? Mills ?? Astorquia	Report1; Report2	Ugalde; C. Alzola, E. McLennan; A. Mendiguren, C. Castellanos, S. Ledo; M. Castelllanos, Guinea, Evans, Langford, Davies	Stadium: Hippodrome of Lamiako; Referee: Luis Orbe
Note: They could not score a goal, as the players got quite confused and could not make a career.

16 November 1901	Athletic Club	2 – 1	English Mariners XI	Bilbao, Basque Country
		Report1; Report2		Stadium: Hippodrome of Lamiako
Note: The club's first international match, vs the crew of either a British warship or a merchant ship

23 November 1901	Athletic Club	7 – 0	English Mariners XI	Bilbao, Basque Country
		Report1; Report2		Stadium: Hippodrome of Lamiako

1 December 1901	Athletic Club	1 – 1	Bilbao FC	Leioa, Basque Country
	Juan Astorquia A. Acha; Mills, Larrañaga; Iraolagoitia, Luis Silva, A. Arana; Astorquia, M. Arana, Sota, R. Silva, Barquín	Report1; Report2	Walter Evans L. Arana; Careaga, Ugalde; J. M. Arana, J. Ansoleaga, M. Ansoleaga; Langford, Dyer, Butwell, Evans and Guinea	Stadium: Hippodrome of Lamiako

7 December 1901	Athletic Club	0 – 0	English Mariners XI	Bilbao, Basque Country
		Report1; Report2		Stadium: Hippodrome of Lamiako

8 December 1901	Athletic Club II	1 – 0	Bilbao FC II	Leioa, Basque Country
	Montejo Alday; R. Eguren, Montejo; Azpeitia, R. Gutiérrez, L. Astorquia; Ángel Pérez, F. Iraolagoitia, Ibáñez de Aldecoa, P. Iraolagoitia, R. Quintana	Report1; Report2		Stadium: Hippodrome of Lamiako

15 December 1901	Athletic Club	0 – 1	Bilbao FC	Leioa, Basque Country
	Acha; Larrañaga, Mills; L. Silva, Iraolagoitia, A. Arana; Goiri, Sota, M. Arana, J. Eguren, R. Silva	Report	Dyer L. Arana; Careaga, Martínez de las Rivas; J. Arana, Cochran, Ugalde; Langford, Dyer, Butwell, Walter Evans	Stadium: Hippodrome of Lamiako

12 January 1902	Athletic Club XI	3 – 1	Combinado Jugadores	Leioa, Basque Country
	Mario Arana Careaga; A. Arana, J. M. Arana; M. Arana, M. Castelllanos, Ansoleaga; Chávarri, Renovales, F. Belausteguigoitia, Lasserre, Orbe	Report	? Aulighin; Bary, Mills; Smith, Curtis, Seyh; Lewich, Mackins, Dyer, Langford, Evans	Stadium: Hippodrome of Lamiako

19 January 1902	Athletic Club	4 – 2	Bilbao FC	Leioa, Basque Country
	Ramón Silva 1–0'; Juan Astorquia 2–0', 4–2'; Mario Arana 3–1' Acha; Larrañaga, Goiri; J. Eguren, L. Silva, Barquín; M. Arana, R. Silva, Astorquia, Sota	Report	William Dyer 2–1'; Walter Evans 3–2' N. Ansoleaga; J. Arana, Cochran; Renovales, Langford, Mackins; Levick, Dyer, Lee, Evans, Ansoleaga	Stadium: Hippodrome of Lamiako
Note: The first time that a paid match was held in Biscay. Lee arrived late, so Bilbao FC played with one less player for some time.

16 February 1902	Athletic Club	1 – 1	English Mariners XI	Bilbao, Basque Country
		Report1; Report2		Stadium: Hippodrome of Lamiako

1 March 1902	Athletic Club	1 – 0	English Mariners XI	Bilbao, Basque Country
		Report1; Report2		Stadium: Hippodrome of Lamiako

9 March 1902	Athletic Club II	1 – 0	Bilbao FC II	Leioa, Basque Country
	V. Azcué R. Quintana; R. Ortiz, Ibarzabal; Orue, V. Azcué, Meltzer; Alday, Montejo, A. Gutiérrez, R. Eguren, R. Gutiérrez	Report	Mackins; Renovales, Aureolaga; C. Castellanos, E. McLennan, Chávarri; Guinea, M. Orbe, L. Orbe, Newgin	Stadium: Hippodrome of Lamiako
Note: Athletic played with one more player.

Club Bizcaya

9 March 1902	Burdigala	0–2	Club Bizcaya	Burdeos, France
?	Kuber; Boyer, Balade; Sudraud, Sarrailh, Paillre; Cornali, Cahiol, Sergenton, Giraud, Cabanol	Report	Ramón Silva; Walter Evans L. Arana; Larrañaga, Ugalde; A. Arana, Careaga, J. M. Arana; Sota, R. Silva, Dyer, Astorquia, Evans	Referee: Denis

31 March 1902	Club Bizcaya	7–0	Burdigala	Hippodrome of Lamiako, Biscay
15:30	William Dyer; Juan Astorquia L. Arana; Mills, Larrañaga; L. Silva, J. Eguren, A. Arana; Evans, R. Silva, Dyer, Astorquia, Goiri	Report	Kuhn; Ricard, Giraud; Peyre, Paillere, Mendes; Rabaud, Guillocheau, Dumas, Kraus, Sudraud	Referee: Raine

13 May 1902 1902 Copa de la Coronación quarter-finals	Club Bizcaya	5–1	Club Español	Hipódromo, Madrid
	Juan Astorquia; Walter Evans; William Dyer -' (pen.) L. Arana; L. Silva, JM. Arana; A. Arana, Ugalde, R. Silva; Sota, Astorquia, Dyer, Cazeaux and Evans	Report1; Report2	Ángel Ponz Mora; Soler, Carril; Aracil, G. Galliardo, A. Galliardo; Ruiz, Ponz, Montells, Peña and Méndez	Referee: (England) Samuel Morris

14 May 1902 1902 Copa de la Coronación Semi-finals	Club Bizcaya	8–1	New Foot-Ball Club	Hipódromo, Madrid
	Walter Evans; Raymond Cazeaux; William Dyer; Juan Astorquia L. Arana; L. Silva, JM. Arana; A. Arana, Ugalde, R. Silva; Sota, Astorquia, Dyer, Cazeaux and Evans	Report1; Report2	Montojo José López Amor; Bisbal, Mira; F. Hodans, F. Salazar, F. Valcárcel; Valdeterrazo, Montojo, Vallarino, Piñano, Díaz	Referee: (England) Samuel Morris

15 May 1902 1902 Copa de la Coronación Final	Club Bizcaya	2–1	FC Barcelona	Hipódromo, Madrid
	Juan Astorquia 10'; Raymond Cazeaux 20' L. Arana; Careaga, Larrañaga; L. Silva, A. Arana, Goiri; Astorquia, Cazeaux, Dyer, R. Silva, and Evans	Athletic; RSSSF bdfutbol	John Parsons 75' S. Morris; Puelles, Meyer; M. Morris, Witty, Valdés; Parsons, Gamper, Steinberg, Albéniz, and E. Morris	Referee: (Spain) Carlos Padrós
