= Luis Silva (footballer, born 1879) =

Spanish footballer

Personal information
- Full name: Luis Cosme Damián Silva Abaitua
- Date of birth: 28 September 1879
- Place of birth: Bilbao, Spain
- Date of death: 15 August 1946 (aged 66)
- Position: Defender

Senior career*
Years	Team	Apps	(Gls)
1901–1902	Athletic Club	3	(0)
1902	Club Bizcaya	3	(0)
1903–1905	Athletic Club	2	(0)
- * Club domestic league appearances and goals

Luis Cosme Damián Silva Abaitua (28 September 1879 – 15 August 1946) was a Spanish footballer who played as a defender for Athletic Bilbao.

He was one of the co-founders of Athletic Club in 1901 and a member of the club's first board of directors. As a player, he was part of the team that won the 1902 Copa de la Coronación, the first national championship disputed in Spain, and then helped the club win two Copa del Rey titles in 1903 and 1904.

== Playing career ==
=== Athletic Club ===
On 5 September 1901, he and his younger brother Ramón were among the 33 socios (co-founders) who signed the documents that officially established the Athletic Club at the historic meeting in Café García. Unlike his brother, Luis was part of the club's very first board of directors a few months earlier, on 11 June, appearing as a member under the presidency of Luis Márquez.

The Silva brothers were some of the first football players of the newly created Basque team, for whom they played a few friendly matches against city rivals Bilbao Football Club in the Hippodrome of Lamiako. For instance, Luis featured in three of them, always alongside his brother in the midfield, including the first paid match held in Biscay on 19 January 1902, in which Ramón scored once while Luis "played very well and with great serenity", as reported in the newspapers of the time. The Silva brothers were pivotal figures in this historic rivalry that served as one of the drivers of football as a mass phenomenon in Bilbao since their duels aroused great expectation.

=== Club Bizcaya ===
In 1902, the two rivals agreed to join the best players of each club to face the Bordeaux-based side Burdigala. This temporary merge became known as Club Bizcaya and despite the inclusion of six English from Bilbao FC, Silva earned a spot in the starting eleven against Burdigala at Lamiako on 31 March, the first visit by a foreign team to Bilbao, helping his side to a 7–0 win over the French side.

Together with Juan Astorquia, William Dyer, Walter Evans and his brother, he was part of the Bizcaya team that won the first national championship disputed in Spain, the 1902 Copa de la Coronación, the forerunner for the Copa del Rey. He featured in the final alongside his brother and helped his side to a 2–1 win over FC Barcelona.

=== Athletic Club ===
In 1903, Bilbao FC collapsed and its remaining members were officially absorbed by Athletic Club. Silva played two competitive matches for Athletic between 1903 and 1905, the Copa del Rey finals of 1903 and 1905, both against Madrid FC (now Real Madrid), winning the former after helping his team recover from a 0–2 deficit at half-time to win 3–2, but then losing the latter 0–1, courtesy of a goal from Manuel Prast. He was also part of the team that won the 1904 Copa del Rey, which Athletic won without playing a single match since their opponents failed to turn up.

== Death ==
Silva died on 15 August 1946, at the age of 66.

== Honours ==
Club Bizcaya

- Copa de la Coronación:
  - Winners: 1902

Athletic Club

- Copa del Rey:
  - Winners: 1903 and 1904
  - Runner-up: 1905
