= List of Athletic Bilbao seasons =

This is a list of seasons played by Athletic Bilbao in Spanish and European football, from 1898 to the most recent completed season. It details the club's achievements in major competitions, and the top scorers for each season.

Athletic Club's finishing positions since 1929. They are one of three clubs that have been present in every top flight season.

The club has won the League eight times, the Spanish Cup 25 times (including one disputed victory competing as Vizcaya), the Spanish Super Cup three times (once by default after completing a double), and the Copa Eva Duarte once.

== Key ==
Key to league record:

- Pos = Final position
- Pld = Matches played
- W = Matches won
- D = Matches drawn
- L = Matches lost
- GF = Goals for
- GA = Goals against
- Pts = Points

Key to rounds:

- W = Winner
- F = Final
- SF = Semi-finals
- QF = Quarter-finals
- R16 = Round of 16
- R32 = Round of 32
- R64 = Round of 64
- R5 = Fifth round
- R4 = Fourth round
- R3 = Third round
- R2 = Second round
- R1 = First round
- GS = Group stage
- LP = League phase

== Seasons ==
Season	League									Cup	Europe		Other Comp.		Top scorer(s) (Note: Goals scored in all competitions) (Note: Statistics for the Regional Championships are incomplete; top scorers based on information available)	
Season	Division	Pos	Pld	W	D	L	GF	GA	Pts	Cup	Europe		Other Comp.		Player(s)	Goals
1898–99	No national league available														No official matches	0
1899–1900	No national league available														No official matches	0
1900–01	No national league available														No official matches	0
1901–02	No national league available									W (Note: Competing as part of Bizcaya)					William Dyer Walter Evans	5
1902–03	No national league available									W					Juan Astorquia De la Sota	2
1903–04	No national league available									W					No official matches (Note: Awarded the cup without playing a single match)	0
1904–05	No national league available									RU					No scorers	0
1905–06	No national league available									RU					3 players	1
1906–07	No national league available									RU (Note: Competing as part of Club Bizcaya)					Charles Simmons	4
1907–08	No national league available									DNE					No official matches	0
1908–09	No national league available									QF					Luis Saura Mortimer	1
1909–10	No national league available									W					Remigio Iza	2
1910–11	No national league available									W					Martyn Veitch	3
1911–12	No national league available									DNE					No official matches	0
1912–13	No national league available									RU					Pichichi	3
1913–14	No national league available									W			Regional Championship	W	Pichichi	13
1914–15	No national league available									W			Regional Championship	W	Pichichi	22
1915–16	No national league available									W			Regional Championship	W	Pichichi	13
1916–17	No national league available									DNE			Regional Championship		Pichichi Zubizarreta	6
1917–18	No national league available									DNE			Regional Championship		Pichichi	11
1918–19	No national league available									DNE			Regional Championship		Laca Pichichi	5
1919–20	No national league available									RU			Regional Championship	W	José Laca	6
1920–21	No national league available									W			Regional Championship	W	Domingo Acedo	7
1921–22	No national league available									DNE			Regional Championship		Carmelo	8
1922–23	No national league available									W			Regional Championship	W	Travieso	14
1923–24	No national league available									SF			Regional Championship	W	José Laca	12
1924–25	No national league available									DNE			Regional Championship		Sandalio Areta	9
1925–26	No national league available									GS			Regional Championship	W	Manuel Suárez	19
1926–27	No national league available									GS			Regional Championship		Lafuente Manuel Suárez	5
1927–28	No national league available									GS			Regional Championship	W	José Ayarza	14
1928–29	La Liga	3rd	18	8	4	6	43	33	20	SF			Regional Championship	W	Víctor Unamuno	28
1929–30	La Liga	1st	18	12	6	0	63	28	30	W			Regional Championship		Guillermo Gorostiza (Note: The overall top scorer was Víctor Unamuno on 33 (but only 15 in the Liga); Gorostiza is listed due to his Pichichi Trophy achievement)	32 (Note: 19 goals in the Liga)
1930–31	La Liga	1st	18	11	0	7	73	33	22	W			Regional Championship	W	Bata	38 (Note: 27 goals in the Liga)
1931–32	La Liga	2nd	18	11	3	4	47	23	25	W			Regional Championship	W	Guillermo Gorostiza (Note: The overall top scorer was Bata on 29; he also scored 12 in the Liga but from 18 games; Gorostiza is listed due to his Pichichi Trophy achievement)	25 (Note: 12 goals in the Liga, from 15 games)
1932–33	La Liga	2nd	18	13	0	5	63	30	26	W			Regional Championship	W	Bata	37
1933–34	La Liga	1st	18	11	2	5	61	27	24	QF			Regional Championship	W	Bata	34
1934–35	La Liga	4th	22	11	3	8	60	37	25	R16			Basque Cup	W	Bata	28
1935–36	La Liga	1st	22	14	3	5	59	33	31	QF			Basque Cup		Bata	30
1936–37	Spanish Civil War															
1937–38	Spanish Civil War															
1938–39										R1 (Note: Club competed under the Bilbao Athletic name)			Regional Championship	W (Note: Club competed under the Bilbao Athletic name)	Guillermo Gorostiza	8
1939–40	La Liga	3rd	22	11	4	7	57	44	26	R2			Regional Championship	W	Víctor Unamuno (Note: Guillermo Gorostiza also scored 29 but only 16 in the Liga; Unamuno is listed due to his Pichichi Trophy achievement)	29 (Note: 20 goals in the Liga)
1940–41	La Liga	2nd	22	13	5	4	49	24	31	R16					Víctor Unamuno	11
1941–42	La Liga	7th	26	10	7	9	55	41	27	RU					Telmo Zarra	28
1942–43	La Liga	1st	26	16	4	6	73	38	36	W					Telmo Zarra	24
1943–44	La Liga	10th	26	10	5	11	47	51	25	W					Telmo Zarra	21
1944–45	La Liga	6th	26	14	2	10	54	41	30	W					Telmo Zarra	34
1945–46	La Liga	3rd	26	15	5	7	63	38	33	R16			Copa de Oro Argentina	RU	Telmo Zarra	24 (Note: 24 goals in the Liga)
1946–47	La Liga	2nd	26	15	4	7	72	38	34	SF					Telmo Zarra	37 (Note: 34 goals in the Liga)
1947–48	La Liga	6th	26	12	4	10	56	44	28	R16					José Luis Panizo	17
1948–49	La Liga	6th	26	11	2	13	61	63	24	RU					Telmo Zarra	31
1949–50	La Liga	6th	26	12	5	9	72	66	29	W					Telmo Zarra	36 (Note: 25 goals in the Liga)
1950–51	La Liga	7th	30	15	3	12	88	56	33	SF			Copa Eva Duarte	W	Telmo Zarra	49 (Note: 38 goals in the Liga)
1951–52	La Liga	2nd	30	17	6	7	78	46	40	R16					Venancio	18
1952–53	La Liga	6th	30	14	4	12	83	52	32	RU					Telmo Zarra	29
1953–54	La Liga	6th	30	12	8	10	54	44	32	QF					Eneko Arieta	17
1954–55	La Liga	3rd	30	15	9	6	78	39	39	W					Eneko Arieta	23
1955–56	La Liga	1st	30	22	4	4	79	31	48	W			Latin Cup	RU	José Luis Artetxe	20
1956–57	La Liga	4th	30	16	5	9	59	45	37	R16	European Cup	QF			Félix Markaida	14
1957–58	La Liga	6th	30	14	4	12	56	48	32	W					José Luis Artetxe	17
1958–59	La Liga	3rd	30	17	2	11	72	33	36	R16					Ignacio Uribe	16
1959–60	La Liga	3rd	30	19	1	10	74	45	39	SF					Félix Markaida	21
1960–61	La Liga	7th	30	12	6	12	42	41	30	QF					Eneko Arieta	14
1961–62	La Liga	5th	30	12	8	10	52	38	32	QF					Eneko Arieta	15
1962–63	La Liga	10th	30	10	8	12	41	40	28	R16					José Argoitia	9
1963–64	La Liga	8th	30	12	5	13	43	40	29	R2					Eneko Arieta	8
1964–65	La Liga	7th	30	13	6	11	36	41	32	SF	Fairs Cup	QF			Antón Arieta	15
1965–66	La Liga	5th	30	14	6	10	43	32	34	RU					Javier Ormaza	16
1966–67	La Liga	7th	30	11	9	10	43	36	31	RU	Fairs Cup	R1			José Argoitia	16
1967–68	La Liga	7th	30	11	10	9	51	28	32	QF	Fairs Cup	QF			Fidel Uriarte	26 (Note: 22 goals in the Liga)
1968–69	La Liga	11th	30	10	8	12	42	46	28	W	Fairs Cup	QF			Fidel Uriarte	9
1969–70	La Liga	2nd	30	17	7	6	44	20	41	SF	Cup Winners' Cup	R1			Félix Zubiaga	12
1970–71	La Liga	5th	30	14	7	9	40	31	35	R16	Fairs Cup	R1			Fidel Uriarte	12
1971–72	La Liga	9th	34	15	4	15	39	32	34	SF	UEFA Cup	R2			Fidel Uriarte	17
1972–73	La Liga	9th	34	12	9	13	41	38	33	W					Txetxu Rojo	9
1973–74	La Liga	5th	34	15	7	12	35	31	37	R32	Cup Winners' Cup	R2			José Lasa	7
1974–75	La Liga	10th	34	13	7	14	40	42	33	SF					Carlos Ruiz	21
1975–76	La Liga	5th	34	14	11	9	43	38	39	R32					Dani	14
1976–77	La Liga	3rd	34	15	8	11	55	45	38	RU	UEFA Cup	RU			Dani	29
1977–78	La Liga	3rd	34	16	8	10	62	36	40	R16	UEFA Cup	R3			Dani	25
1978–79	La Liga	9th	34	12	10	12	56	46	34	R16	UEFA Cup	R1			Dani	15
1979–80	La Liga	7th	34	15	5	14	52	44	35	R16					Dani	30
1980–81	La Liga	9th	34	14	7	13	64	53	35	SF					Carlos Ruiz	21
1981–82	La Liga	4th	34	18	4	12	63	41	40	QF					Dani	18
1982–83	La Liga	1st	34	22	6	6	71	36	50	QF	UEFA Cup	R1			Dani	23
1983–84	La Liga	1st	34	20	9	5	53	30	49	W	European Cup	R2	Supercopa de España	RU	Manu Sarabia	11
1984–85	La Liga	3rd	34	13	15	6	39	26	41	RU	European Cup	R1	Supercopa de España	W (Note: Awarded trophy due to winning the League and Cup double)	Dani	10
1985–86	La Liga	3rd	34	17	9	8	44	31	43	SF	UEFA Cup	R3			Manu Sarabia	8
1986–87	La Liga	13th	34	11	9	14	39	40	31	SF	UEFA Cup	R2			Manu Sarabia	12
1987–88	La Liga	4th	38	17	12	9	50	43	46	R16					Pedro Uralde	17
1988–89	La Liga	7th	38	15	12	11	45	35	42	R16	UEFA Cup	R2			Pedro Uralde	17
1989–90	La Liga	12th	38	11	15	12	37	39	37	R16					Ander Garitano	7
1990–91	La Liga	12th	38	15	6	17	41	50	36	R5					Ernesto Valverde	16
1991–92	La Liga	14th	38	13	7	18	38	58	33	QF					Cuco Ziganda	12
1992–93	La Liga	8th	38	17	6	15	53	49	40	R3					Cuco Ziganda	16
1993–94	La Liga	5th	38	16	11	11	61	47	43	R4					Cuco Ziganda	20
1994–95	La Liga	8th	38	16	10	12	39	42	42	QF	UEFA Cup	R3			Julen Guerrero	16
1995–96	La Liga	15th	42	11	15	16	44	55	48	R16					Joseba Etxeberria	10
1996–97	La Liga	6th	42	16	16	10	72	57	64	R4					Cuco Ziganda	17
1997–98	La Liga	2nd	38	17	14	7	52	42	65	QF	UEFA Cup	R2			Joseba Etxeberria	13
1998–99	La Liga	8th	38	17	9	12	53	47	60	R16	Champions League	GS			Ismael Urzaiz	17
1999–2000	La Liga	11th	38	12	14	12	47	57	50	R2					Joseba Etxeberria	11
2000–01	La Liga	12th	38	11	10	17	44	60	43	R16					Ismael Urzaiz	13
2001–02	La Liga	9th	38	14	11	13	54	66	53	SF					Ismael Urzaiz	18
2002–03	La Liga	7th	38	15	10	13	63	61	55	R32					Ismael Urzaiz	15
2003–04	La Liga	5th	38	15	11	12	53	53	56	R64					Fran Yeste	11
2004–05	La Liga	9th	38	14	9	15	59	54	51	SF	UEFA Cup	R32			Ismael Urzaiz	12
2005–06	La Liga	12th	38	11	12	15	40	46	45	R16	Intertoto Cup	R2			Aritz Aduriz	6
2006–07	La Liga	17th	38	10	10	18	44	62	40	R32					Ismael Urzaiz	8
2007–08	La Liga	11th	38	13	11	14	40	43	50	QF					Fernando Llorente	12 (Note: 11 goals in the Liga)
2008–09	La Liga	13th	38	12	8	18	47	62	44	RU					Fernando Llorente	18 (Note: 14 goals in the Liga)
2009–10	La Liga	8th	38	15	9	14	50	53	54	R32	Europa League	R32	Supercopa de España	RU	Fernando Llorente	23
2010–11	La Liga	6th	38	18	4	16	59	55	58	R16					Fernando Llorente	19 (Note: 18 goals in the Liga)
2011–12	La Liga	10th	38	12	13	12	49	52	49	RU	Europa League	RU			Fernando Llorente	29 (Note: 17 goals in the Liga)
2012–13	La Liga	12th	38	12	9	17	44	65	45	R32	Europa League	GS			Aritz Aduriz	18
2013–14	La Liga	4th	38	20	10	8	66	39	70	QF					Aritz Aduriz	18 (Note: 16 goals in the Liga)
2014–15	La Liga	7th	38	15	10	13	42	41	55	RU	Champions League	GS	Europa League	R32	Aritz Aduriz	26
2015–16	La Liga	5th	38	18	8	12	58	45	62	QF	Europa League	QF	Supercopa de España	W	Aritz Aduriz	36
2016–17	La Liga	7th	38	19	6	13	53	43	63	R16	Europa League	R32			Aritz Aduriz	24
2017–18	La Liga	16th	38	10	13	15	41	49	43	R32	Europa League	R16			Aritz Aduriz	20 (Note: 9 goals in the Liga)
2018–19	La Liga	8th	38	13	14	11	41	45	53	R16					Iñaki Williams	14 (Note: 12 goals in the Liga)
2019–20	La Liga	11th	38	13	12	13	41	38	51	RU					Raúl Garcia	15
2020–21	La Liga	10th	38	11	13	14	46	42	46	RU			Supercopa de España	W	Raúl Garcia	10 (Note: 5 goals in the Liga)
2021–22	La Liga	8th	38	14	13	11	43	36	55	SF			Supercopa de España	RU	Iñaki Williams	8
2022–23	La Liga	8th	38	14	9	15	47	43	51	SF					Iñaki Williams	11 (Note: 10 goals in the Liga)
2023–24	La Liga	5th	38	19	11	8	61	37	68	W					Gorka Guruzeta	16
2024–25	La Liga	4th	38	19	13	6	54	29	70	R16	Europa League	SF	Supercopa de España	SF	Oihan Sancet	17 (Note: 15 goals in the Liga)
2025–26	La Liga	12th	38	13	6	19	43	58	45	SF	Champions League	LP	Supercopa de España	SF	Gorka Guruzeta	17

Winners	Runners-up	Third place	European Cup/Champions League qualification	UEFA Cup/Europa League qualification	Pichichi Trophy	Zarra Trophy
