= Amado Arana =

Spanish footballer

Personal information
- Full name: Amado Arana Mendívil
- Date of birth: 3 March 1879
- Place of birth: Bilbao, Spain
- Date of death: Unknown
- Place of death: Madrid, Spain
- Position: Defender

Senior career*
Years	Team	Apps	(Gls)
1901–1902	Athletic Club		
1902	Club Bizcaya		
1902–1904	Athletic Club		
- * Club domestic league appearances and goals

Amado Arana Mendívil (3 March 1879 – after 1904) was a Spanish footballer who played as a defender for Athletic Club. He was one of the co-founders of Athletic Club in 1901 and was part of the team that won the 1902 Copa de la Coronación, the first national championship disputed in Spain, and the team that won the 1903 Copa del Rey, the first official national championship.

== Biography ==
Together with his younger brother Mario, he was one of the pioneers of football in Bilbao. On 5 September 1901, Amado Arana was one of the 33 members who signed the documents that officially established the Athletic Club at the historic meeting in Café García (Mario did not do so as he was only 17 at the time). He was then one of the first players of the newly created team, with whom he played several friendly matches against city rivals Bilbao Football Club at the Hippodrome of Lamiako.

In 1902, the two rivals agreed to combine the best players of each club to face the Bordeaux-based side Burdigala. This temporary merge became known as Club Bizcaya and Larrañaga ousted Bilbao FC's defenders to be part of the first-ever line-up of the Bizcaya team that faced Burdigala on 9 March, contributing to a clean-sheet in a 2–0 win in France. Three weeks later, on 31 March 1902, he was again in Bizcaya's starting XI for the return fixture at Lamiako, the first visit by a foreign team to Bilbao, helping his side to a 7–0 win. Together with Juan Astorquia, Armand Cazeaux, William Dyer and Walter Evans, he was part of the Bizcaya team that won the first national championship disputed in Spain, the 1902 Copa de la Coronación, forerunner of the Copa del Rey.

He was also part of the Athletic team that won the 1903 Copa del Rey, featuring in the final alongside the likes of Alejandro de la Sota, and club founders Juan Astorquia and Eduardo Montejo; Arana was at the heart of a 3–2 comeback win over Madrid FC (now known as Real Madrid) in the final. He was also part of the team for the 1904 Copa del Rey, which Athletic won without playing a single match since their opponents failed to turn up.

== Honours ==
Club Bizcaya

- Copa de la Coronación: 1902

Athletic Club

- Copa del Rey: 1903, 1904
