= Perico Larrañaga =

Spanish footballer

Pedro Larrañaga
Personal information
- Full name: Pedro Larrañaga Arana
- Date of birth: 1 July 1885
- Place of birth: Portugalete, Spain
- Date of death: 26 February 1909 (aged 23)
- Place of death: Madrid, Spain
- Position: Defender

Senior career*
Years	Team	Apps	(Gls)
1901	Athletic Club de Portugalete		
1901–1902	Athletic Club		
1902	Club Bizcaya		
1902–1907	Athletic Club		
- * Club domestic league appearances and goals

Pedro Larrañaga Arana, also known as Perico Larrañaga (1 July 1885 – 26 February 1909), was a Spanish footballer who played as a defender for Athletic Bilbao. He was one of the co-founders of Athletic Club in 1901 and was part of the team that won the 1902 Copa de la Coronación, the first national championship disputed in Spain.

== Playing career ==
At some point during his youth, Larrañaga trained as a footballer in Newcastle upon Tyne. In the 1901–02 season, he returned to his native town of Portugalete where he continued to play sports, in particular, football with his hometown team, Athletic Club de Portugalete. In early 1902, the newly incorporated Athletic Club in Bilbao wanted to acquire the services of Larrañaga but his team refused to give him away, so the Bilbao club opted to temporarily absorb the entire Portugalete club, the first of its many mergers. Larrañaga soon made his debut, thus becoming the club's first-ever player from the Enkarterri district (which today is defined as the more rural part of western Biscay but then included Portugalete and other industrial towns closer to Bilbao, referred to collectively as the left bank).

In 1902, Larrañaga played a few friendly matches against city rivals Bilbao Football Club in the Hippodrome of Lamiako, including the first paid match held in Biscay on 19 January 1902 (probably his debut), in which the newspapers of the time reported that "Larrañaga, as always, was a very reliable defender who did not leave his position for a moment".

In May 1902, the two rivals agreed to combine the best players of each club to face the Bordeaux-based side Burdigala. This temporary merge became known as Club Bizcaya and Larrañaga ousted Bilbao FC's defenders to be part of the first-ever line-up of the Bizcaya team that faced Burdigala on 9 March, contributing to a 2–0 win in France. Three weeks later, on 31 March 1902, he was again in Bizcaya's XI for the return fixture at Lamiako, the first visit by a foreign team to Bilbao, where he formed a defensive partnership with Alfred Mills, Athletic's only foreign player, in a 7–0 win over the French side. Together with Juan Astorquia, Armand Cazeaux, William Dyer and Walter Evans, he was part of the Bizcaya team that won the first national championship disputed in Spain, the 1902 Copa de la Coronación, forerunner of the Copa del Rey. Larrañaga featured in the final in which the Basques defeated FC Barcelona 2–1.

On 13 March 1904, he played for Athletic de Portugalete in a friendly against Athletic de Bilbao, keeping a clean sheet in a 0–0 draw, and was therefore invited to play for the Bilbao club again; he was listed in the team that won the 1904 Copa del Rey without playing a single match, since their opponents failed to turn up, and later that year he was in the first-ever line-up that faced Madrid FC (now Real Madrid CF) on 24 April 1904, his side winning 2–1. He was intermittently involved in matches throughout the rest of the decade; in 1907, he played a friendly with Athletic de Bilbao against his hometown club Athletic de Portugalete.

== Death and legacy ==
Larrañaga died young on 26 February 1909, at the age of just 23, for unknown reasons. He had two brothers, Marcos and Adolfo.

In 2013, the Encartaciones Museum, in the Avellaneda Meeting House, in Sopuerta, held a temporary exhibition that compiles the connection between this Biscayan region and the Left Bank with Athletic in the last century, and Larrañaga received special attention as the club's first-ever Encartado. Since Larrañaga made his debut with the red and white shirt in 1902, until the last debut of Erik Morán in 2012, more than 70 players from what in other times was Las Encartaciones have played for Athletic.

== Honours ==
Club Bizcaya

- Copa de la Coronación:
  - Winners: 1902

Athletic Club

- Copa del Rey:
  - Winners: 1904
