= Ricardo Ugalde =

Spanish footballer

Personal information
- Full name: Ricardo Andrés Ugalde Moneo
- Date of birth: 5 November 1877
- Place of birth: Gorliz, Spain
- Date of death: Unknown
- Position: Defender

Senior career*
Years	Team	Apps	(Gls)
1901–1902	Athletic Club	3	(0)
1902	Club Bizcaya	3	(0)
- * Club domestic league appearances and goals

Ricardo Andrés Ugalde Moneo (5 November 1877 – Unknown) was a Spanish footballer who played as a defender for Athletic Bilbao.

== Playing career ==
=== Bilbao FC ===
In the late 1890s, Ugalde became a member of an informal group led by Carlos and Manuel Castellanos, the so-called Bilbao Football Club, the first entity to play football in Bilbao since the disappearance of Club Atleta. Although it was formed in 1896, it was not until 30 November 1900 that the Bilbao Football Club was officially established.

Ugalde was one of the first players of the newly created Basque team, for whom he played a few friendly matches against city rivals Athletic Club in the Hippodrome of Lamiako. For instance, he featured as a midfielder in Bilbao FC's first-ever victory over Athletic on 15 December, thus playing a pivotal role in this historic rivalry that served as one of the drivers of football as a mass phenomenon in Bilbao since their duels aroused great expectation.

=== Club Bizcaya ===
In 1902, Ugalde managed to arrange two friendly matches with the Bordeaux-based side Burdigala. In order to face them, the two rivals agreed to join the best players of each club in a temporary merge that became known as Club Bizcaya and despite the inclusion of six English from Bilbao FC, Ugalde earned a spot in the starting eleven in Bordeaux on 9 March, the first time a Bilbao team played on foreign territory, helping his side to a 2–0 win.

Together with Juan Astorquia, William Dyer, Walter Evans, Ugalde was part of the Bizcaya team that won the first national championship disputed in Spain, the 1902 Copa de la Coronación, the forerunner for the Copa del Rey. Although he did not play in the final, Ugalde started in the quarterfinals against RCD Espanyol (5–1) and in the semifinals against New Foot-Ball Club (8–1).

== Outside football ==
In 1898, the 21-year-old Ugalde was among the founders of Sporting Club de Bilbao, becoming the club's member no. 12 by 1902.

The date of his death is unknown.

== Honours ==
Club Bizcaya

- Copa de la Coronación:
  - Winners: 1902
