= Bilbao Football Club =

Spanish football club

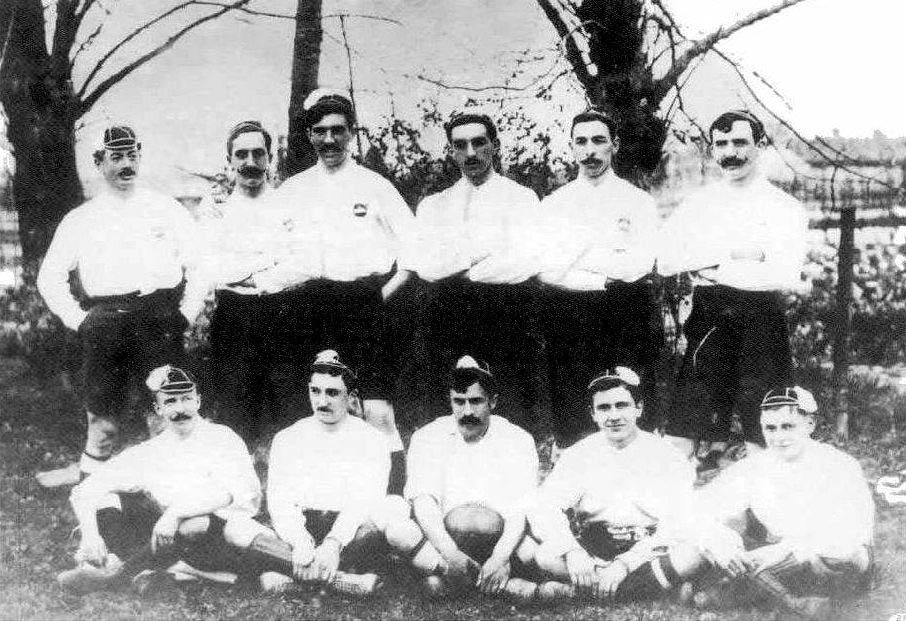
- Players of Club Vizcaya, the combined team of Bilbao FC and Athletic Club
- Founded: 1900
- Dissolved: 1903
- Ground: Hippodrome of Lamiako
Home colours	Away colours

Bilbao Football Club was a football team based in Bilbao, Spain, which existed during the years 1900 and 1903. In 1902 they combined with city rivals Athletic Club to form Club Vizcaya, a team which won the 1902 Copa de la Coronación. The following year they were absorbed by Athletic Club.

== History ==
=== Background ===
Football arrived in Bilbao at the end of the 19th century, thanks to British visiting sailors and immigrant workers, such as the British employees of the Nervión Shipyards, located in Sestao (Vizcaya), who in 1889 formed a multi-sports club called Club Atleta. As they had no rivals in the city, the only competitive matches they played were the ones against crews of English ships coming from Portsmouth and Southampton and Sunderland. Their first real rival in the city was a team known as the Bilbao Football Club, which was also made up of British residents in the region, but not linked to the shipyards, such as Alfred Mills, who was a telegraph operator.

In the winter of 1892–93, Club Atleta and Bilbao FC contested a "serious" tournament in the Hippodrome of Lamiako, a racetrack from where football took off in Bilbao, with several Bilbainos swarming the field to watch the teams of British workers challenge each other every weekend. In the autumn of 1894, most of the British employees of the Nervión Shipyards returned to the United Kingdom, and as a result, Club Atleta, which was never officially established, seems to disappear. Due to the absence of rivals, Bilbao FC also folded.

=== Origins ===
With Club Atleta gone, organized football in Bilbao entered a period of hibernation until someone, with new impetus, rescued it from oblivion, but fortunately, this period was not excessively long. In 1896, a group of friends led by the young landowner Carlos Castellanos, who used to spend the summer in their rooms next to the Bilbao Abra in the Getxo town of Las Arenas, befriended a group of British people who used to pass through their leisure time at the Hotel Antolín, next to the suspension bridge that connects both banks of the estuary. Their friendship resulted in the idea of playing together from time to time in the sandy areas where the Paseo de Zugazarte stands today and, sometimes, also in the surroundings of the hermitage of Santa Ana.

Castellanos, who was the grandson of a wealthy banker of French origin, had discovered football in one of his comings and goings to the United Kingdom, where he had the opportunity to learn first-hand about the successful growth of professional football, and thus, through the correspondence he maintained with his brother Manuel, he recommended him the convenience of becoming a club. With the disappearance of the Bilbao FC that existed in 1892–93, the most logical name for a new football club founded in Bilbao (Bilbao Football Club) was now available again, so they took it. Bilbao Football Club was thus formed in 1896 by the Castellanos brothers, together with a group of friends from the Bilbao upper class who had studied in England, among whom were the Arana brothers (José Antonio and Luis), Enrique Careaga, José Zulueta, and Ricardo Ugalde, among other prominent figures from the local bourgeoisie, such as Santiago Martínez de las Rivas, the son of José María Martínez de las Rivas, the owner of the Nervión Shipyards. All of the aforementioned figures, including the Castellanos brothers, appear in the 1902 membership list of Real Sporting Club, which they had helped found in 1898.

Castellanos, who is said to have been the first Spaniard to bring a ball and boots to the Iberian Peninsula, took command of the new sports center, which operated with complete regularity and who, through their associates, rented some of the nearby fields of Lamiako to play without problems when the occasion demanded. Bilbao FC's uniformed with white shirts and pants in a methodical manner, in both home and away games.

=== Unofficial years ===
Between 1896 and 1898, the crews of the MacAndrews shipping company and British citizens residing in the area for work reasons were the main contenders of Bilbao FC, who would lose more often than not. In order to compete with the teams of British workers, who were clearly superior and more advanced, this group of Basque football pioneers began to recruit several experienced British players such as MacLennan, Butwell, William H. Davies, George Langford, and George Cochran, with the latter having previously played with the English Colony of Barcelona Football Team in Barcelona.

The usual practice of these meetings between English teams progressively attracted a notable number of followers and curious people, one of them being the young enthusiastic Juan Astorquia, a person very interested in joining the society due to his knowledge of the subject after having studied for four years in a British college in Manchester. However, Astorquia felt annoyed by the massive presence of Britons in its ranks and left the club, going on to become the figurehead of a seven-man committee that in 1898, formed what would later become Athletic Club, who unlike Bilbao FC, was almost entirely made of players from Biscay.

Between 1898 and 1900, the members of both Bilbao FC and Athletic Club, despite not being registered with the Civil Government, continued to maintain their legal personality intact, playing a good number of matches outside of journalistic attention between October and May (at the time, football was only played in the winter while cricket was the sport that occupied the summer). Bilbao FC, as both the oldest club and the club with the best organization and clairvoyance when it comes to complying with the Law, was the first to regularize its situation in 1900.

=== Becoming official ===
Although this group of football pioneers had been playing football since 1896, it was not until 1900 that this entity had its regulations approved by the Civil Government at an undetermined time during the summer, and thus, on 30 November 1900, Bilbao Football Club was officially established in an informal meeting held in the house (chalet) of industrialist José Luis de Villabaso (1852–1917) in the Biscayan neighborhood of Algorta. This great step was only possible thanks to the endorsement of Villabaso. The entity's board was subsequently elected, with Castellanos being appointed the club's president, José Zulueta as secretary and Ramón de Aras Jáuregui as treasurer.

Although Castellanos dispensed with legal requirements such as publicizing its existence in the Civil Government, an omission which would be corrected in 1900, Bilbao FC still is recognized as the first football club established in Bilbao, since it was only a few months later, in February 1901, that Athletic Club, probably encouraged by the first news about the founding of Bilbao FC, began conversations to officially establish the club, which they did on 5 September 1901, in the infamous meeting held in the Café García, in which the 33 members decided to make it official and register as a sports organization with the local council.

The initiative of Villabaso and the Castellanos brothers was supported by other young sportsmen from the high society in Las Arenas and Algorta, such as the aforementioned founders of 1896, plus some of the more recent members, such as Luis Orbe, Rogelio Renovales, Ramón de Aras Jáuregui, Manuel Ansoleaga, Antonio Guinea (1883, Bilbao), and other prominent figures from the local bourgeoisie, such as Santiago Martínez de las Rivas. The team, which already had British in its ranks, such as Langford and Cochran, would be joined by a few more, such as Charlton Levick, Lee, Walter Evans, and William Dyer. On the other hand, the Athletic team only had one foreigner in its ranks, Alfred Mills.

=== Rivalry with Athletic Club ===
At the end of 1901, the two most important clubs in the city were Bilbao FC and Athletic Club, thus sparking a growing rivalry between them on the playing field. Since there were hardly any fields in Bilbao, the two sides agreed to share the Lamiako field, which they rented together. Lamiako was thus the home to one of the first great rivalries in the history of Spanish football, with the first game between the two sides taking place on 10 November 1901, ending in a goalless draw. This duel aroused great interest, so both teams agreed to call for a new match to define the winner of their meeting, which took place on 1 December and also ended in a draw, this time at one goal apiece, with Astorquia scoring for Athletic and Walter Evans scoring for Bilbao FC. The second teams of both clubs joined the party as well and contested a match in early December, with Athletic's Eduardo Montejo scoring the only goal of the match. This rivalry helped turn football into a mass phenomenon in Bilbao since their duels aroused great expectation.

Two weeks later, on 15 December, the third game was held, with Bilbao FC claiming a 1–0 victory. Athletic was missing two players, including Astorquia, who was unable to play due to being constipated, being replaced by Remigio Eguren, who at that time belonged to Athletic's second team; Bilbao FC, on the other hand, was missing Manuel Ansoleaga who was not replaced, so both teams played with 10 players. Nothing remarkable happened in the first half, as the players were very cold due to the temperature, but in the second half, however, all the players made an effort due to their desire to break the tie and define the winner. Bilbao FC took the lead thanks to Walter Evans, who scored after taking advantage of a missed kick by one of the Athletic players. Despite Athletic's efforts to equalize, particularly from Ramón Silva, neither side was able to score again as Bilbao FC won 1–0. Some sources state that the only goal of this match was actually scored by William Dyer.

Athletic's revenge came a month later, on 19 January 1902, when they won 4–2. The latter game was the first time that a paid match was held in Vizcaya, since this time they charged a ticket price of 30 cents of a peseta. Due to the unavailability of Luis Arana, Careaga, and Santiago Martínez de las Rivas, Bilbao FC had to field seven Englishmen, including an attacking quintet made up of Dyer, Langford, Levick, Lee and Evans, but one of them, Lee, arrived late, so Athletic played with one more player for some time, hence dominating the first half and scoring two goals via Astorquia and Ramón Silva. In the second half, however, Lee took his place, thus completing the forward line of his team, while their goalkeeper, Rogelio Renovales, moved into midfield and Ansoleaga took over as goalkeeper. As a result of this change, Bilbao FC began to push much more and they were rewarded with a goal from Dyer, but then both teams began trading goals, with Mario Arana from Athletic made it 3–1, then Evans cut down the deficit for Bilbao FC, and finally, another from Astorquia sealed Athletic's win. The reporter J. Ugalde stated that after Athletic won the "noble exhibition" 4–2, spectators jumped over the ropes to play their own imitative games, and presciently noted: "Maybe one day everyone will play this game. It seems to be bringing folks together. It seems to arouse extraordinary curiosity".

The fifth match, which was held on 9 March 1902, ended with a new Athletic victory, with V. Azcué scoring the only goal of the match.

=== Club Bizcaya ===
Despite the sporting rivalry between the two clubs, their relations were friendly, and thus, the two rivals agreed to join the best players of each club to play two games against the Bordeaux-based side Burdigala, beating them 0–2 in France, the first time a Bilbao team played on foreign territory, and 7–0 in Lamiako (four from Dyer and three from Astorquia), the very first visit by a foreign team to Bilbao, gathering a crowd of three thousand spectators, a tremendous amount at the time. This temporary merge became known as Club Bizcaya (with a B).

Taking advantage of the occasion of the coronation of Alfonso XIII, Madrid FC (now known as Real Madrid) organized the Copa de la Coronación, the first national championship disputed in Spain and the forerunner for the Copa del Rey which began in the following year. Upon an invitation from Madrid FC, Club Bizcaya went to Madrid to represent the city of Bilbao with a squad of 14 players, of which six were from Bilbao FC, the Arana brothers, Careaga, Ugalde, Evans, and Dyer. The Basques played and won three games on consecutive days, defeating FC Barcelona in the final with goals from the captain Juan Astorquia and Raymond Cazeaux, both of Athletic. They thus returned to Bilbao with the trophy presented by the mayor of Madrid.

=== Decline and collapse ===
Juan Astorquia, the then president and team captain of Athletic, used Bizcaya's successful campaign to convince Luis Arana of how necessary it was to merge the two clubs. Furthermore, the heat of the summer melted away the interest in football, with the owners of Bilbao FC losing interest in their team. In November 1902, these two sides played one final match, which ended in a 1–0 win to Athletic, but by the end of 1902, Bilbao FC was going through a certain crisis, and in mid-autumn, it seemed that both Athletic and Bilbao FC were on the verge of collapse, so their only solution was to join forces, permanently.

On 24 March 1903, Bilbao FC agreed at the General Meeting to dissolve the club and its remaining members and associates were officially and definitively swallowed up and absorbed by their rival, and the side that emerged from the unification was called Athletic Club de Bilbao. Once these critical moments were resolved, the successes continued to accompany Athletic, who have been crowned the Champions of Spain in 1903, 1904, 1910 and 1911.

== Notable players ==
- Enrique Careaga: Played in three friendlies, participated in the 1902 Copa de la Coronación, and later became the 3rd president of Athletic Bilbao.
- Manuel Ansoleaga: Played in three friendlies, played in the final of the 1903 Copa del Rey and later became the very first manager of Atlético Madrid.
- Ricardo Ugalde: Played in four friendlies and participated in the 1902 Copa de la Coronación.
- José Antonio de Arana: Played in three friendlies and participated in the 1902 Copa de la Coronación.
- Luis Arana: Played in three friendlies and participated in the 1902 Copa de la Coronación.
- Luis Orbe: Refereed the club's first-ever match on 10 November 1901 and played in one match on 9 March 1902, featuring alongside his brother, a certain M. Orbe.
- Rogelio Renovales: Played in two friendlies and later became the president of Real Club Marítimo del Abra.
- José Zulueta Ysasi (1882, Algorta): The grandson of Julián de Zulueta, 1st Marquis of Álava, a mayor of Havana, slave trader, sugar producer, and one of the wealthiest people in 19th century Cuba.
- Antonio Guinea Basterra, a player of Bilbao FC who was the only Spanish in the team's attacking quintet.
- William H. Davies, a player of Bilbao FC and who played in the final of the 1905 Copa del Rey.

== Results ==
Bilbao Football Club

10 November 1901	Athletic Club	0 – 0	Bilbao FC	Leioa, Basque Country
	?? Mills ?? Astorquia	Report	Ugalde; C. Alzola, E. McLennan; A. Mendiguren, C. Castellanos, S. Ledo; M. Castellanos, Guinea, Evans, Langford, Davies	Stadium: Hippodrome of Lamiako; Referee: Luis Orbe
Note: They could not score a goal, as the players got quite confused and could not make a career.

1 December 1901	Athletic Club	1 – 1	Bilbao FC	Leioa, Basque Country
	Juan Astorquia A. Acha; Mills, Larrañaga; Iraolagoitia, L. Silva, A. Arana; Astorquia, M. Arana, Sota, R. Silva, Barquín	Report1; Report2	Walter Evans L. Arana; Careaga, Ugalde; J. Arana, J. Ansoleaga, M. Ansoleaga; Langford, Dyer, Butwell, Evans and Guinea	Stadium: Hippodrome of Lamiako

15 December 1901	Athletic Club	0 – 1	Bilbao FC	Leioa, Basque Country
	Acha; Larrañaga, Mills; L. Silva, Iraolagoitia, A. Arana; Goiri, Sota, M. Arana, J. Eguren, R. Silva	Report	Dyer L. Arana; Careaga, Martínez de las Rivas; J. Arana, Cochran, Ugalde; Langford, Dyer, Butwell, Walter Evans	Stadium: Hippodrome of Lamiako

19 January 1902	Athletic Club	4 – 2	Bilbao FC	Leioa, Basque Country
	Ramón Silva (1–0); Juan Astorquia (2–0); Mario Arana (3–1) Acha; Larrañaga, Goiri; J. Eguren, L. Silva, Barquín; M. Arana, R. Silva, Astorquia, Sota	Report	William Dyer (2–1); Walter Evans (3–2) N. Ansoleaga; J. Arana, Cochran; Renovales, Langford, Mackins; Levick, Dyer, Lee, Evans, Ansoleaga	Stadium: Hippodrome of Lamiako
Note: The first time that a paid match was held in Biscay. Lee arrived late, so Bilbao FC played with one less player for some time.

9 March 1902	Athletic Club	1 – 0	Bilbao FC	Leioa, Basque Country
	V. Azcué R. Quintana; R. Ortiz, Ibarzabal; Orue, V. Azcué, Meltzer; Alday, Montejo, A. Gutiérrez, R. Eguren, R. Gutiérrez	Report	Mackins; Renovales, Aureolaga; C. Castellanos, E. McLennan, Chávarri; Guinea, M. Orbe, L. Orbe, Newgin	Stadium: Hippodrome of Lamiako
Note: Athletic played with one more player.

Club Bizcaya

13 May 1902 1902 Copa de la Coronación quarter-finals	Bilbao FC + Athletic Club	5–1	Club Español	Hipódromo, Madrid
	Juan Astorquia; Walter Evans; William Dyer (-)	Report1; Report2	Ángel Ponz	Referee: (England) Samuel Morris

14 May 1902 1902 Copa de la Coronación Semi-finals	Bilbao FC + Athletic Club	8–1	New Foot-Ball Club	Hipódromo, Madrid
	Walter Evans; Raymond Cazeaux; William Dyer; Juan Astorquia	Report1; Report2	Montojo	Referee: (England) Samuel Morris

15 May 1902 1902 Copa de la Coronación Final	Bilbao FC + Athletic Club	2–1	FC Barcelona	Hipódromo, Madrid
	Juan Astorquia 10'; Raymond Cazeaux 20'	Athletic; RSSSF bdfutbol	John Parsons 75'	Referee: (Spain) Carlos Padrós

Bilbao Football Club

23 November 1902	Athletic Club	1 – 0	Bilbao FC	Leioa, Basque Country
	? Acha; L. Silva, A. Arana; J. Eguren, M. Ansoleaga, Larrañaga; Astorquia, Mills, Ibáñez de Aldecoa, V. Azcué, Davies	Report	L. Arana; Careaga, Culloch; Gouk, Cochran, Ugalde; Langford, Allen, Mackins, C. Castellanos, Evans	Stadium: Hippodrome of Lamiako

== See also ==
History of Athletic Bilbao
