= Ramón Silva (footballer) =

Spanish footballer (1884–1954)

Personal information
- Full name: Ramón Silva Abaitua
- Date of birth: 21 April 1884
- Place of birth: Bilbao, Spain
- Date of death: 25 September 1954
- Position: Defender

Senior career*
Years	Team	Apps	(Gls)
1901–1902	Athletic Club		
1902	Club Bizcaya		
1902–1906	Athletic Club		
- * Club domestic league appearances and goals

Ramón Silva Abaitua (21 April 1884 – 25 September 1954) was a Spanish footballer who played as a defender for Athletic Bilbao. He was one of the co-founders of Athletic Club in 1901 and was part of the team that won the 1902 Copa de la Coronación, the first national championship disputed in Spain.

== Playing career ==
=== Athletic Club ===
On 5 September 1901, he and his brother Luis were two of the 33 socios (co-founders) who signed the documents that officially established the Athletic Club at the historic meeting in Café García. He was then one of the first football players of the newly created Basque team, with whom he played several friendly matches against city rivals Bilbao Football Club in the Hippodrome of Lamiako.

The Silva brothers, particularly Ramón, were pivotal figures in this historic rivalry that served as one of the drivers of football as a mass phenomenon in Bilbao since their duels aroused great interest. On 19 January 1902, Silva scored the opening goal to help his side to an eventual 4–2, which not only marked Athletic's first victory over Bilbao FC in four matches, but also the first time that a paid match was held in Biscay, since they charged a ticket price of 30 cents of a peseta.

=== Club Bizcaya ===
In 1902, the two rivals agreed to join the best players of each club to face the Bordeaux-based side Burdigala. This temporary merge became known as Club Bizcaya and Silva ousted Bilbao FC's English forwards for a spot in the first-ever line-up of the Bizcaya team against Burdigala on 9 March, netting the opening goal in a 2–0 win in France. Three weeks later, on 31 March 1902, he was again in Bizcaya's starting XI for the return fixture at Lamiako, the first visit by a foreign team to Bilbao, helping his side to a 7–0 win.

Together with Juan Astorquia, William Dyer, Walter Evans and his brother, he was part of the Bizcaya team that won the first national championship disputed in Spain, the 1902 Copa de la Coronación, forerunner of the Copa del Rey. He featured in the final alongside his brother and helped his side to a 2–1 win over FC Barcelona. Later, he was one of the eleven players who started for Athletic in their 11–1 win over Barcelona on 15 April 1906.

Silva died on 25 September 1954, at the age of 70.

== Honours ==
Club Bizcaya

- Copa de la Coronación: 1902
