= 1903 Copa del Rey final =

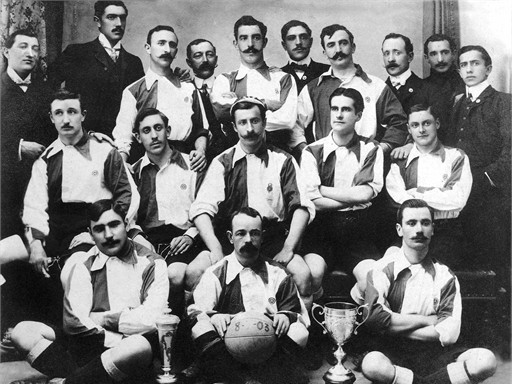
- Athletic Bilbao, champion
- Event: 1903 Copa del Rey
| Athletic Bilbao | Madrid FC |
| 3 | 2 |
- Date: 8 April 1903
- Venue: Hipódromo, Madrid
- Referee: José María Soler

The 1903 Copa del Rey final was the first final of the Copa del Rey, the Spanish football cup competition. The match took place on 8 April 1903 at the Hipódromo, Madrid. The match was contested by Athletic Bilbao and Madrid FC.

Madrid FC scored twice in the first half to lead the match 0–2 down at the break. However, a crucial harangue at the break by the Athletic Bilbao captain and president Juan Astorquia, inspired Athletic to pull off an epic comeback in the second half that turned the game around, thus lifting the trophy for the first time with a 3–2 victory. Athletic Bilbao claims this trophy to be their second in a row, although the Royal Spanish Football Federation does not recognize the previous tournament as official. Six Athletic players who played in this final had been proclaimed champions of the Coronation Cup in the previous year with Club Bizcaya.

This match has been identified as a catalyst for the establishment a few weeks later of what would eventually become Club Atlético de Madrid, after some Madrid-based Basque students among the spectators were inspired by the comeback victory by Athletic Bilbao and decided to form a local branch of the club.

== Summary ==
Just like the previous year, in the 1902 Copa de la Coronación, Athletic Club arrived at the decisive match at the Madrid Hippodrome without time to rest, unlike their rival. In addition to playing in enemy territory and having greater fatigue, the drawing of fields benefited Madrid since the Bilbao team had to play the first half with a strong headwind. The Madrid team, playing in front of 5,000 expectant spectators, took advantage of the circumstance and converted it into a 2–0 lead at the break with goals from Miguel de Valdeterrazo opening the scoring in the 15th minute, while Antonio Neyra doubled their advantage in the 40th minute.

Madrid FC decided to go defensive in the second half, feeling they could hold a 2–0 lead against a demoralized Athletic Bilbao team, but instead, they found an Athletic side even more driven than before, largely thanks to a crucial harangue at the break by their captain and president Juan Astorquia. Since the figure of coach as we know it today did not exist at the time, Astorquia felt obliged to take a step forward and gathered the players around him in the Biscayan locker room to give them a harangue. Its exact content is unknown since his words or screams were not recorded, but according to the chroniclers of the time it ended with a war cry: Por el Athletic y por Bilbao ("For Athletic and for Bilbao"). With two goals in two matches, he was the tournament's joint-top scorer alongside teammate de la Sota and Madrid's Armando Giralt.

Madrid was able to resist Athletic's relentless siege for only 10 minutes, as the Basque club found a goal when Raymond Cazeaux scored in the 55th minute. The Athletic attack kept colliding again and again with the Madrid defense, and despite some fine saves from goalkeeper Arthur Johnson, and great defensive work from the Giralt brothers (Mario, Armando and José), the people from Bilbao managed to find the equalizer with 20 minutes to go thanks to Eduardo Montejo. Athletic did not let go of the siege and pressed for a winner, which they found in the 80th minute when Walter Evans, Athletic's left winger, perhaps its most talented footballer, made a "beautiful play" to assist Alejandro de la Sota, who came in from behind, attentive to the Englishman's antics, and he received a ball so perfect that he only had to push it into the net with his chest. "I scored it with my heart," he said years later, remembering that historic goal that sent the people from Bilbao into euphoria. The result remained unchanged until the final whistle, and Athletic Bilbao was proclaimed as the first official champion of Spain.

== Match details ==
8 April 1903

| Athletic Bilbao | 3–2 | Madrid FC |
|---|---|---|
| Cazeaux 55'; Montejo 70'; De la Sota 80' | Report 1 Report 2 | De Valdeterrazo 15'; Neyra 40' |

Estadio del Hipódromo, Madrid
Referee: José María Soler

Athletic Bilbao

Madrid FC

| GK | (Spain) Alejandro Acha |
| DF | (Spain) Luis Silva |
| DF | (Spain) Amado Arana |
| MF | (Spain) Enrique Goiri |
| MF | (Scotland) George Cochran |
| MF | (Spain) Manuel Ansoleaga |
| FW | (Spain) Alejandro de la Sota |
| FW | (Spain) Eduardo Montejo |
| FW | (Spain) Juan Astorquia (c) |
| FW | (England) Raymond Cazeaux |
| FW | (England) Walter Evans |

| GK | (Ireland) Arthur Johnson |
| DF | (Spain) Rafael Molera |
| DF | (Spain) Mario Giralt |
| MF | (Spain) Armando Giralt |
| MF | (Spain) José Giralt |
| MF | (France) Enrique Normand |
| FW | (France) Pedro Parages |
| FW | (Spain) Miguel de Valdeterrazo |
| FW | (Spain) Antonio Neyra |
| FW | (Guatemala) Federico Revuelto (c) |
| FW | (Spain) Manuel Vallarino |

== See also ==
- El Viejo Clásico
