= George Cochran (footballer) =

Scottish footballer

George Cockram
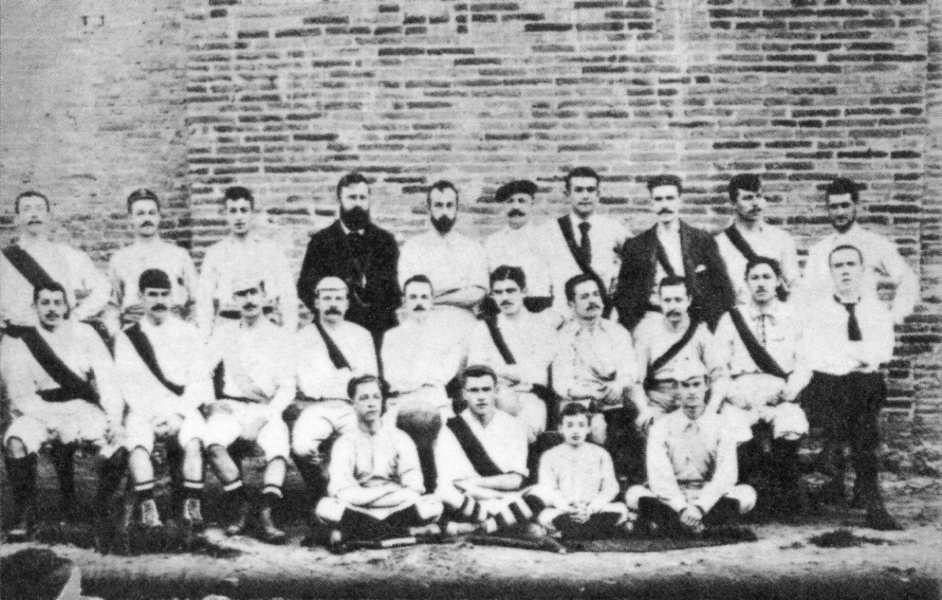
- Cockram (second row, fifth from left) in 1893

Personal information
- Full name: George Paterson Cochran
- Date of birth: 21 August 1870
- Place of birth: Bathgate, West Lothian, Scotland
- Date of death: 25 April 1929 (aged 58)
- Place of death: Paisley, Scotland
- Positions: Midfielder; forward

Senior career*
| Years | Team | Apps | (Gls) |
| 1892–1894 | Barcelona Football Club | | |
| 1895 | Torelló Foot-ball Association | | |
| 1901–1902 | Bilbao FC | | |
| 1902–1904 | Athletic Club | | |
- * Club domestic league appearances and goals

George Paterson Cochran, sometimes referred to as George Cockram (21 August 1870 – 25 April 1929), was a Scottish football pioneer who played for some of the first Catalan and Basque clubs in history, most notably Athletic Bilbao between 1902 and 1904.

He was one of the most important figures in the amateur beginnings of football in Spain, playing a significant role in promoting football in Catalonia and then Bilbao. In Catalonia, he played as a forward for several experimental teams in the 1890s such as Barcelona Football Club and Torelló Foot-ball Association, and in Bilbao, he played as a midfielder for some of the earliest Basque clubs in existence in the early 1900s such as Bilbao FC and Athletic Club, winning the 1903 Copa del Rey with the latter.

== Early life ==
Cochran was born on 21 August 1870 in Bathgate. He was the only son of the seven children of William Cochran and Elizabeth Paterson. A few years later, the family, supposedly for work reasons, settled in the town of Paisley, Renfrewshire, Scotland. At some point in the early 1890s, the 20-year-old Cochran arrived in Barcelona for work reasons, like many other Britons who moved to the Catalan capital. There is no record of where he worked, but we do know that he immediately started playing football with other Britons.

== Footballing career ==
=== Barcelona Football Club ===
In 1892, Cochran met James Reeves, who was recruiting football enthusiasts to create a well-organized club, and he joined him, having been impressed by his entrepreneurial spirit. Together with Reeves and some other pioneers in the city, such as Henry W. Brown, Henry Wood, and the Morris (Jaime and Samuel), they formed Barcelona Football Club in late 1892, and Cochran was crucial in its success. The only other known Scottish in the club was William MacAndrews, although the nature of their relationship remains unknown.

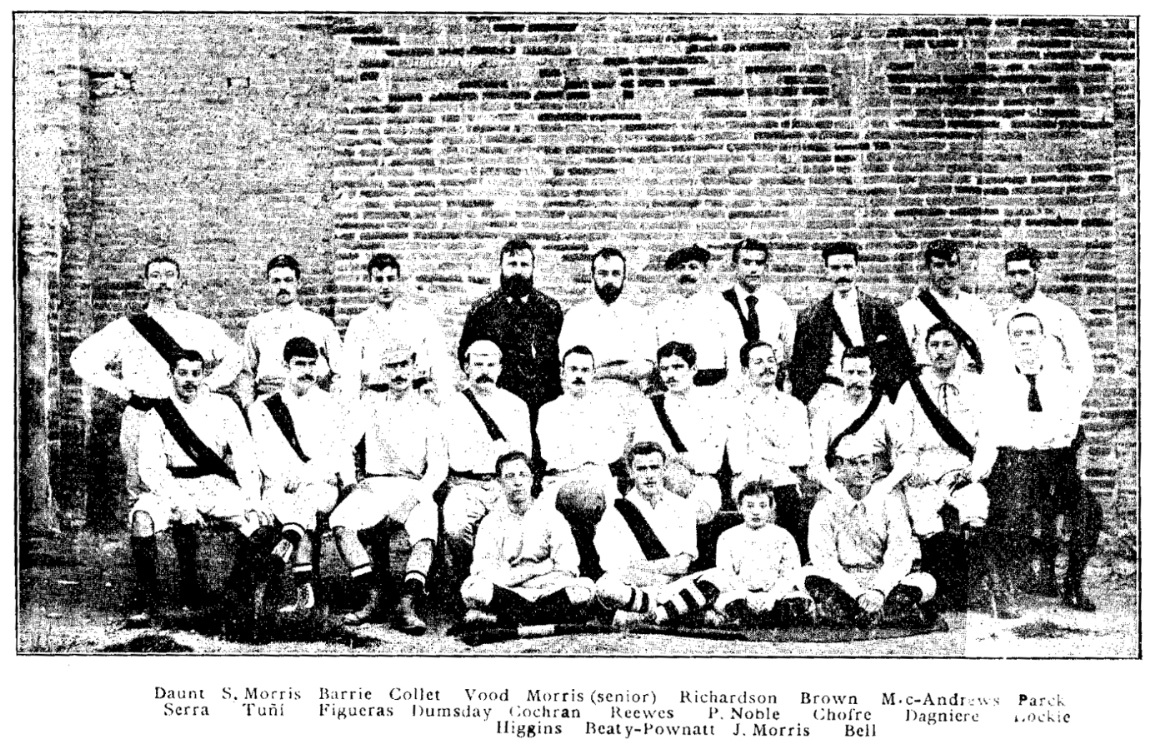
Cochran appears in the oldest documented image of a football team in Spain. He can be seen in the second row, the fifth from the left, between Dumsday and Reeves, the Red's captain.

This entity held the first known football match in the city, which was held at Hippodrome of Can Tunis on 25 December 1892. It remains unclear if he played in this match. However, he did play on 12 March 1893 in the historic match between a Red team captained by Reeves and a Blue team led by himself, guiding his side to a 2–1 victory with two goals from locals (Figueras and Jorge Barrié). Cochran appears in a group shot of these two sides before the match, in which he is sitting alongside the captain of the rival team, Reeves; this is widely regarded to be the oldest photograph of a football team in Spain. He continued to dispute matches with assiduity, but due to the little statistical rigor that the newspapers had at that time, the exact number of matches and goals that he made is unknown.

Either at the end of 1894 or the beginning of 1895, and as suggested in the press, they formally started a football club in Barcelona by founding the Sociedad de Foot-Ball de Barcelona Between 1892 and 1894, Reeves and Cochran always acted as captains of the two sides into which the members of the club were divided every Sunday. The last example of this was on 8 December 1894, this time with Cochran being the captain of the Reds and Reeves of the Blues, and he scored the third in a 3–1 victory. In his next and last match with the Barcelona club, he appeared with the loss of the captaincy, which was given to the 20-year-old John Beaty-Pownall. This was most likely the result of a growing conflict between him and Reeves, probably about the formalization process that the club was going through, which eventually caused the entity to split into two groups, one headed by Reeves and the other by Cochran, Wood, and MacAndrews. Cochran's group decided to move and settle in the neighboring town of Sant Vicenç de Torelló in Osona, where they introduced football to the textile colony of Borgonyà built by the Scottish spinning company owned by the Coats brothers, originally from Paisley.

=== Torelló Foot-ball Association ===
Apart from training matches (Blues vs Reds), the Torelló society only played two matches in the 1894–95 season, both against Barcelona, which marked the first time that teams from two different cities played against each other in Catalonia, and Cochran was the captain in both games. The first match took place on 24 March 1895 and ended in an 8–3 away loss, and the result was attributed to the fact that Torelló played against the sun and against the wind, and that their five forwards had trouble getting through Barcelona's strong and robust defenders. Torelló's goals were netted by Cochran, Englis and A. Tong. The second match was held in Torelló on 14 April, and according to the chronicles of the time, they disputed this so-called "challenge" as an act of revenge, and this time victory smiled at those from Torelló with a 5–3 win. Remarkably, Cochran netted a hat-trick in the first half to give a 3–0 lead to his side, in an eventual 5–3 victory.

When James Reeves returned to the U.K. in the autumn of 1895, the Barcelona Football Society began to decline and around 1896 it seems to disappear. Due to the absence of rivals. The Torelló Foot-ball Association continues to play amateur football to this day under the name C.D. Borgonyà to more accurately reflect the location of the club. However, it is known that many of the players of the Barcelona societies continued to practice football through other societies such as the Barcelona Velocipedistas Society, which used to organize football games and other typically English Sports, but such arrangements also seem to be gone by the end of 1896.

At some point in the late 1890s, Cochran moved to Biscay in the Basque Country, presumably due to work reasons, living in Portugalete for a few years. While in Biscay, his surname is almost always written as Cockran or Cockram.

=== Bilbao Football Club ===
In 1901, together with fellow Britons George Langford, William Dyer, and Walter Evans, the 31-year-old Cochran was one of the British residents in Bilbao who joined the recently established Bilbao Football Club. At the end of 1901, the two most important clubs in the city were Bilbao FC and Athletic Club (now known as Athletic Bilbao), thus sparking a rivalry between the two sides, who played several friendlies against each other at the Hippodrome of Lamiako. Cochran thus participated in what is now regarded as one of the first rivalries in Spanish football, one that helped turn the sport into a mass phenomenon in Bilbao since their duels aroused great interest. On 19 January 1902, Cochran played in the first paid match held in Biscay, since the public was charged with a ticket price of 30 cents of a peseta; Bilbao FC lost 2–4.

=== Athletic Club ===
On 24 March 1903, Bilbao FC collapsed and its remaining members were officially absorbed by Athletic Club. Cochran became an Athletic player and remained there until the end of the 1903–04 season, playing only two matches for them, including the 1903 Copa del Rey Final, in which he played alongside the likes of Alejandro de la Sota, fellow Briton Walter Evans, and club founders Juan Astorquia and Eduardo Montejo, the latter having also lived in Portugalete. Cochran was at the heart of a 3–2 comeback triumph over Madrid FC (now known as Real Madrid) in the final. His second appearance was a friendly match against Burdigala in Lamiako on 13 April 1904, helping his side to a 3–1 win.

Cochran was also part of the team that won the 1904 Copa del Rey, which Athletic were awarded without playing a single match since their opponents failed to turn up.

== Later life and death ==
Cochran married Josefa Laban, and they had a son in 1914, George. In January 1929, the family moved from Santander to Liverpool with their final destination being Paisley. Just a few months later, however, on 25 April, Cochran died at his home in Paisley, at the age of 58. His mother and son returned to Santander on 6 July of the same year.

== Honours ==
Athletic Club

- Copa del Rey:
  - Winners: 1903, 1904
  - Runner-up: 1905
