= Mario Arana =

Spanish footballer

Personal information
- Full name: Mario Arana Mendívil
- Date of birth: 24 May 1884
- Place of birth: Bilbao, Spain
- Date of death: 22 March 1931 (aged 46)
- Place of death: Madrid, Spain
- Position: Forward

Senior career*
Years	Team	Apps	(Gls)
1901–1904	Athletic Club	+3	(+1)
- * Club domestic league appearances and goals

Mario Arana Mendívil (24 May 1884 – 22 March 1931) was a Spanish politician who served as a mayor of Bilbao between 1916 and 1919, and a footballer who played as a forward for Athletic Club.

== Early life and education ==
Arana was born on 24 May 1884 in Bilbao to an industrial and liberal father, Francisco Arana Lupardo, a member of the El Sitio Society and councilor of the Bilbao City Council in 1883–85, representing the Liberal Democrat party.

Mario Arana studied law at the University of Deusto. Among his hobbies, football stood out, becoming a player for Athletic Bilbao together with his older brother Amado. According to his biographers, Mario Arana had an extroverted personality, and developed intense public sociability in Bilbao at the time, being linked to the activities of the Basque Youth.

== Football career ==
On 5 September 1901, his brother was one of the 33 members who signed the documents that officially established the Athletic Club at the historic meeting in Café García (Mario did not as he was only 17 at the time). He was then one of the first players of the newly created Basque team, playing several friendly matches against city rivals Bilbao Football Club in the Hippodrome of Lamiako, which the two teams shared since there were hardly any fields in Bilbao at the time.

Arana played as a forward for Athletic in two matches in December 1901, keeping a clean sheet in the second to help his side to a 2–0 victory. Arana was thus part in what is now regarded as one of the first football rivalries in Spain, one that helped turn football into a mass phenomenon in Bilbao since their duels aroused great expectation. In his next match on 19 January 1902, Arana scored in a 3–1 victory over Bilbao FC in what was the very first paid match in Biscay, since they charged a ticket price of 30 cents of a peseta. The chronicles of this match reported that "M. Arana played very well and with great serenity".

Arana was part of the team that won the 1904 Copa del Rey, which Athletic won without playing a single match since their opponents failed to turn up.

== Politic career ==
=== Mayor of Bilbao ===
With a nationalist ideology, Arana belonged to the Comunión Nacionalista Vasca in the Basque Nationalist Party. Arana became the Mayor of Bilbao by royal appointment in 1915, a moment of rapprochement between the incipient Basque nationalism and the Monarchy. This appointment being supported by the President of the Liberal Committee of Bilbao Federico de Echeverría with great indignation of men like Balparda, and of the socialists and republicans. In his speech, which was considered historical by the opinion, he expressed the spirit of entente with Spain.

Arana officially took office as the mayor of Bilbao on 1 January 1916, a position that he held for three years until 3 July 1919, spanning two terms. In 1917, the appointment of mayors was replaced by the election method, and this time he was elected mayor by the vote of the people. It has been wrongly said that he was the first nationalist mayor of Bilbao since two others preceded him, but Arana was indeed the first elected nationalist mayor of Bilbao, by vote, in 1918 and as such attended the Congress of Oñate that year.

During Arana's mandate, measures were approved to promote culture and the Basque language. Thus, the regulations for the service of the popular libraries of Bilbao were updated and voluntary Basque classes were created in the school groups of Ribera and Indautxu as of 1 September 1918.

Regarding infrastructure and public works, Arana oversaw the reconstruction of the Teatro Arriaga (a fire had destroyed the theater in 1914). Another relevant decision was the creation of the Metropolitan Bilbao Services Association, in an attempt to promote the creation of a metropolitan city with advanced services. In 1918, Arana launched the "Housing Board", whose mission was to build affordable housing and manage it for rent, the seed of what later became "Municipal Housing". In its first 100 years, more than 25,000 families were assisted by the municipal government.

Another of the challenges that Arana had to face during his mandate was the 1917 Spanish general strike, called by the Unión General de Trabajadores (UGT) and the Confederación Nacional del Trabajo (CNT) at the state level. In Bilbao, the strike was carried out by 100,000 workers, who paralyzed the town between 13 and 19 August. The clashes with the assault guard and the derailment of a train near La Peña left 11 dead and dozens injured. Arana's most complicated challenge, however, was when the city of Bilbao was hit by the Influenza pandemic of 1918; during the months of September and October, more than 700 deaths were recorded in Bilbao due to the flu. During the epidemic, the mayor had a direct involvement in managing the crisis and his participation was subsequently praised by doctors and other social entities.

Autonomy issues acquired great prominence during Arana's mandate, and thus, on 17 July 1917, the Bilbao City Council adhered to the manifesto approved by the Basque councils in favor of political self-government. This inspired similar initiatives in other Biscayan city councils, which were supported by the Bilbao city council in order to establish agreements in favor of the autonomy of the City Councils of Bizkaia. A mayoral decree brought together the assembly of municipalities of Biscay on 15 December 1918 to request political self-government, but various altercations took place and the civil Governor suspended Mayor M. Arana from his position on 20 December; Gabino Orbe Usabanderas officially succeeded him as mayor on 3 July 1919.

=== Later career ===
During the autonomist agitation that followed the collapse of the Empires in the First World War, and having been designated "Favorite Son of Bilbao", Arana was elected to the Spanish Parliament in 1919, as a Deputy to the Cortes for Bizkaia (Guernica) in 1919, defeating the conservative Bergé, although he resigned in September 1920.

During the political situation of 1920, a sector of Basque nationalism advocated for the union of the right, which implied an electoral agreement with the Monarchic League, an alliance that Arana defended. Finally, the leaders of the Monarchist Action League, such as Ramón Bergé, among others, preferred an electoral understanding with the socialist Indalecio Prieto, who had been Arana's lieutenant during his first mayoral mandate, to promote the electoral defeat of Bizkaitarrismo.

== Death ==
Arana died in Madrid on 22 March 1931, at the age of 46.
