= José María Barquín =

Spanish footballer

Personal information
- Full name: José María Barquín Eguía
- Place of birth: Bilbao, Spain
- Position: Forward

Senior career*
Years	Team	Apps	(Gls)
1901–1902	Athletic Club	+2	(0)
- * Club domestic league appearances and goals

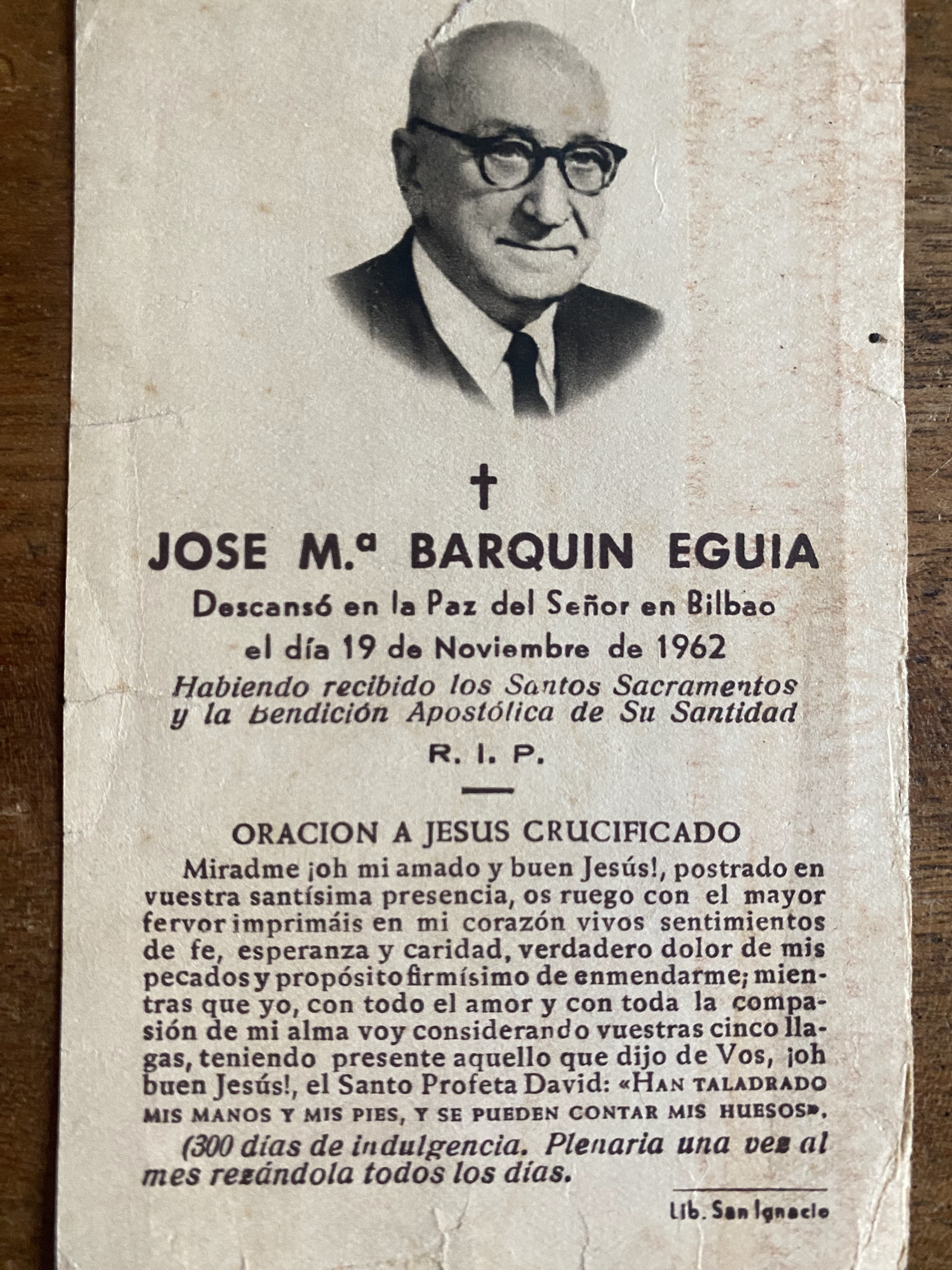
José María Barquín Eguía Death notice

José María Barquín Eguía was a Spanish footballer who played as a forward for Athletic Club. He was one of the most important figures in the amateur beginnings of Athletic Club, being part of the commission that drafted the statutes to legalize the club and then becoming the club's first-ever treasurer on 11 June 1901. He was also a tireless sportsman who dedicated himself to all kinds of sports. He died on 19 November 1962

== Early life and education ==
As the son of a well-off family in Bilbao, Barquín was sent to Britain to complete his studies, doing so in the Catholic St Joseph's College, Dumfries, where he met and befriended Enrique Goiri, a fellow Basque and a future teammate at Athletic Club.

== Footballing career ==
At the turn of the century, Barquín began playing football with Athletic Club, then an unofficial football club. In February 1901, a commission made up of Barquín, Goiri, and Juan Astorquia, was appointed to draft statutes and prepare regulations to legalize the company and thus turn their group of football pioneers into an official football club. Four months later, on 11 June, the statutes were read and approved, and a board of directors was appointed, to which Barquín was elected as an accounting treasurer and Goiri as secretary under the presidency of Luis Márquez. The club was then officially founded on 5 September 1901, in the infamous meeting held in the Café García, but for unknown reasons, Barquín did not attend since he is not one of the 33 men who signed the documents that gave birth to Athletic Club.

Barquín then became one of the first footballers of the newly formed Athletic Club, playing as a forward. He featured in at least two friendly matches against city rivals Bilbao FC at the Hippodrome of Lamiako, including a 1–1 draw on 1 December 1901, and then helping his side to a 4–2 win on 19 January 1902. He thus played a pivotal role in this historic rivalry that served as one of the drivers of football as a mass phenomenon in Bilbao since their duels aroused great expectation.
