= Alfred Mills (footballer) =

English footballer (1874–1929)

Personal information
- Full name: Alfred Edward Elvin Mills
- Date of birth: 15 December 1874
- Place of birth: Lizard, Cornwall
- Date of death: 15 October 1929 (aged 54)
- Place of death: Getxo
- Position: Defender

Senior career*
Years	Team	Apps	(Gls)
1892	Club Atleta		
1901–1904	Athletic Club		
- * Club domestic league appearances and goals

Alfred Edward Elvin Mills (15 December 1874 – 15 October 1929) was an English footballer who played as a defender for Spanish club Athletic Club. He is best known for being the only foreigner among the 33 founders of the club, the 'Inglés en Bilbao'.

He was one of the most important footballers in the amateur beginnings of Athletic, co-founding the club and then serving as a board member and a captain, winning the 1904 Copa del Rey.

== Early life ==
Alfred Mills was born on 15 December 1874 in Lizard, Cornwall. At some point in the early 1890s, Mills arrived in Bilbao with his father to work for the cable company that connected Spain and Great Britain by telephone.

== Playing career ==
In the early 1890s, Mills, a telegraph operator in his teens, was one of the individuals who founded the Bilbao Football Club, a team made up of British residents in the region that played several matches at the Hippodrome of Lamiako against the Club Atleta, a team that mainly consisted of the British workers of the Nervión Shipyards. He was also a good cyclist, it was normal to see him on the streets of Bilbao with his bicycle.

On 5 September 1901, Alfred Mills was one of the 33 founding members signing the statutes (signed as Alfredo Mills) in the infamous meeting held in the Café García, which officially established the Athletic Club. Mills was the only foreign-born person among the 33 who signed the documents and the club's only foreigner in its ranks, and thus he became known in Bilbao simply as "El Inglés". In the 1901 statutes even named him as the captain of the second team and therefore a member of the founding board of directors.

In addition to being a founding member and the team's captain, Mills was a regular starter on the pitch too, playing as a defender who could also operate in midfield. Mills lined up in several of Bilbao's early matches, mostly against local rivals Bilbao Football Club (not related with the Bilbao FC team that existed in 1892–93, formed by the British). Bilbao FC had a large representation of players of British origin, while Athletic was made up of local players with Mills being the only English reinforcement. He initially played in defence in a partnership with Perico Larrañaga and later was used in midfield with another Englishman, George Cochran. His attacking game, according to the chronicles of the time, was terrible, meaning that his accurate kicks on goal would always surprise everyone.

In 1902, Athletic and Bilbao FC agreed to join the best players of each club to play two games against the Bordeaux-based side Burdigala. This temporary merge became known as Club Bizcaya, and Mills was part of the first-ever line-up of the Bizcaya team, a 0–2 away win at Burdeos on 9 March 1902. Three weeks later, on 31 March, Mills featured in Bizcaya's starting XI for the return fixture at home, the first visit by a foreign team to Bilbao, helping his side to a 7–0 win over the French side. However, there are conflicting reports about Mills not having gone to France, as the match report of the second game noted that "Careaga was replaced by the kind Mills", which implies that Careaga was the one who played in France.

Losing or winning is not important, what is important is to play strong, clean, and have fun.

— Alfred Mills

In the 1904 Copa del Rey final, Athletic was declared champions again, doing so without playing a single match as their opponents failed to turn up. The Englishman was intermittently involved in matches throughout the rest of the decade; for instance, he was part of the first-ever Athletic line-up that faced Madrid FC (now known as Real Madrid) on 24 April 1904. On this occasion, his side won by 2 goals to 1.

== Personal life ==
Mills married Fructuosa Rafaela del Valle Rubio and had two children. Although he lived in Logroño, an attack of uremia made him move to Algorta, where he continued to work for the telegraph company until he died on 15 October 1929, at the age of 54. It was his son John, who took up his job in the telegraph company, although he was later transferred to Vigo and then to Peru.

== Honours ==
Athletic Club

- Copa del Rey:
  - Champions: 1904
