= 1902 Copa de la Coronación final =

1902 Copa del Rey final
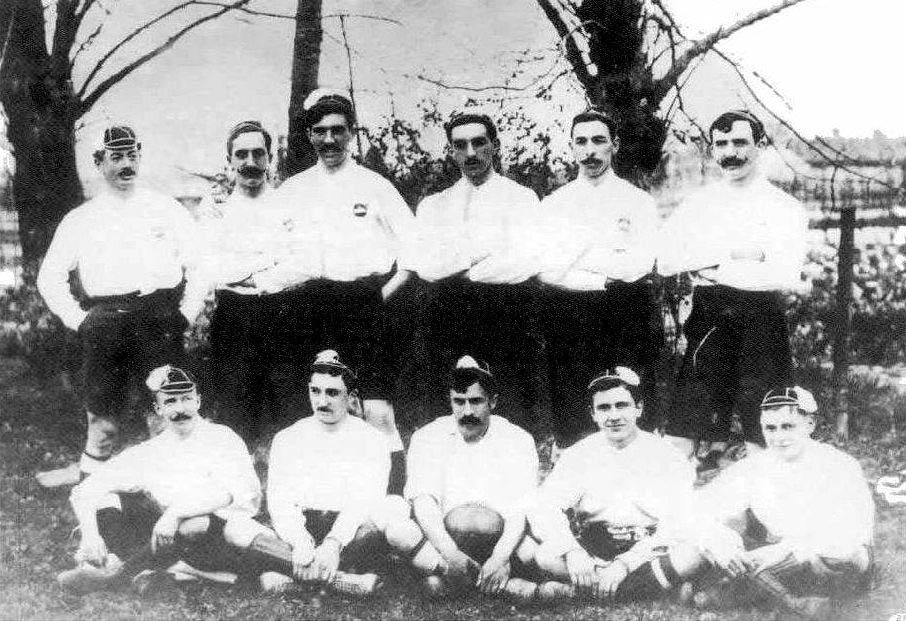
- Champions Club Bizcaya in a 1902 photo
- Event: 1902 Copa del Rey
Club Bizcaya	Barcelona
2	1
- Date: 15 May 1902
- Venue: Hipódromo de la Castellana, Madrid
- Referee: (Spain) Carlos Padrós

The 1902 Copa de la Coronación final was the final of the Copa de la Coronación, the Spanish football cup competition. The match took place on 15 May 1902 at the Hipódromo in Madrid. The match was contested by Club Bizcaya and FC Barcelona, and it was refereed by Carlos Padrós.

Club Bizcaya lifted the trophy for the first time with a 2–1 victory over FC Barcelona. Bizcaya's captain and president Juan Astorquia netted the opening goal early in the first half and they doubled their lead a few minutes later thanks to Raymond Cazeaux. Barcelona only responded in the second half with a goal from John Parsons, but it was not enough to prevent Bizcaya from winning the tournament.

== Match details ==
15 May 1902

Club Bizcaya	2–1	Barcelona
Astorquia 10'; Cazeaux 20'	RSSSF; Athletic bdfutbol	Parsons 75'

Hipódromo de la Castellana, Madrid
Referee: Carlos Padrós (Spain)

Bizcaya

Barcelona

GK	(Spain) Luis Arana
DF	(Spain) Enrique Careaga
DF	(Spain) Perico Larrañaga
MF	(Spain) Luis Silva
MF	(Spain) Amado Arana
MF	(Spain) Enrique Goiri
FW	(England) Raymond Cazeaux
FW	(Spain) Juan Astorquia (c)
FW	(England) William Dyer
FW	(Spain) Ramón Silva
FW	(England) Walter Evans

GK	(England) Samuel Morris
DF	(Spain) Luis Puelles
DF	(Switzerland) George Meyer
MF	(England) Miguel Morris
MF	(England) Arthur Witty
MF	(Spain) Miguel Valdés
FW	(England) John Parsons
FW	(Switzerland) Joan Gamper (c)
FW	(Germany) Udo Steinberg
FW	(Spain) Alfonso Albéniz
FW	(England) Enrique Morris

== See also ==
- Athletic–Barcelona clásico
