= Alejandro de la Sota (footballer) =

Spanish footballer (1881–1963)

7th President of Athletic club
- In office 1911–1917

Personal details
- Born: 1881 Castro Urdiales, Cantabria, Spain
- Died: 8 February 1963 (aged 81–82)
Association football career
- Full name: Alejandro de la Sota Izagirre
- Position: Forward
Senior career*
Years	Team	Apps	(Gls)
1902–1905	Athletic Club		
- * Club domestic league appearances and goals

Alejandro de la Sota Izagirre (1881 – 8 February 1963) was a Spanish footballer who played as a forward for Athletic Club. He was one of the most important figures in the early history of Athletic, having been one of its co-founders in 1901, as well as a team captain, and then serving as the seventh president of the club, ruling from 1911 and 1917, becoming one of the most successful and influential presidents of the Basque club.

Under de la Sota's leadership, Athletic Bilbao achieved its greatest economic and sporting successes, becoming a dominant team on the national level, winning three back-to-back Copa del Rey titles between 1914 and 1916. One of his main achievements was getting the funds for the construction of the San Mamés Stadium, which opened in 1913 and was very important in the club's supremacy in the 1910s.

== Playing career ==
Born in Cantabria to the most richest and influential family in the Basque Country and all of the Pyrenees – the De la Sota family. He was at the historic meeting in the García de la Gran Vía cafe on 5 September 1901, being among the 33 socios (co-founders) of the first-ever club in Bilbao, Athletic Club. He was then one of the first football players of the newly created Basque team. Together with Juan Astorquia, Armand Cazeaux, William Dyer and Walter Evans, he was part of the team (Club Bizcaya, a combination of players from Athletic Club and Bilbao FC) that won the first national championship disputed in Spain, 1902 Copa de la Coronación, the forerunner for the Copa del Rey. La Sota played in the quarter-finals against Club Español and in the semi-finals against New Foot-Ball Club, but missed the final in which the Basque side defeated FC Barcelona 2–1.

He was also part of the historic Athletic side that won the first-ever Copa del Rey in 1903, in which de la Sota contributed decisively, netting the winning goal in the final in an epic 3–2 comeback victory over Madrid FC (now known as Real Madrid). In the 1904 Copa del Rey Final, Athletic were declared winners again after their opponents failed to turn up. He also featured in the 1905 Copa del Rey Final against Madrid FC, which they lost 1–0. Between 1902 and 1905, he played in five competitive matches, in which he scored twice.

== Family ==
The De la Sota Family was the richest on the entire coast of the Bay of Biscay. The family was shipowners, banking and insurance shareholders, with significant assets in Altos Hornos, the largest company in Spain for much of the 20th century. They were also owners of the Bilbao sports papers Excelsior and Excelsius, and of magnificent mansions and entire blocks in Bilbao. Moreover, they were economic supporters of what would become the Basque Nationalist Party, in which they strengthen a philosophy that had already been stitched in Athletic, known as cantera, which resounded over the idea of not using foreigners, only Basques. His family, in addition to amassing wealth, patronized numerous Basque cultural and national organizations, allocating a quarter of their profits to their various ventures. Spanish and other European governments considered them one of the most influential magnates in the Basque region.

== President ==
After finishing his football career, Alejandro kept devoting himself to his club and become Athletic's 7th president in 1911. Having studied his Basque traditions, Alejandro continued them and embodied them in his club, being directly involved in the creation of the concept of the "cantera", and thus, the participation in the team become exclusively for players developed in Biscay (later extended to the wider Basque Country). Athletic followed this tradition of using only local players for more than a hundred years, a club policy which survived into the 21st century, getting through the Spanish Civil War and its aftermath of purges, the avalanche and trend of foreign hiring in the 50s and the change from the peseta to the euro.

Having many acquaintances in the higher circles of Basque society, Alejandro enlisted his family's support in the building of the club: under his rule, the club's socios (members) increased several times. Furthermore, he managed to find funds for the construction of a new stadium in Bilbao, the largest in Spain at that time, which opened in August 1913. San Mamés could seat almost forty thousand people and it was renowned for the unique and boisterous atmosphere its crowds of devoted and loyal fans would create on match days. The stadium is regarded as one of the main sources of power that helped the club grow in the 1910s, assembling a great side that had the likes of José María Belauste, Félix Zubizarreta and Pichichi, winning three back-to-back Copa del Rey titles between 1914 and 1916, beating the likes of RCD Español and Madrid FC in the latter two by scores of 5–0 and 4–0 respectively.

During the Spanish Civil War, the traces of Alejandro were lost. Given the expropriation of all the assets of the De la Sota family, and the persecution of them by the Spanish government, it is likely that Alejandro died.

== Honours ==
- Copa de la Coronación: 1902
- Copa del Rey: 1903, 1904
  - Runner-up: 1905
