= Raymond Cazeaux =

English footballer (1882-1957)

Raymond Jerome Cazeaux
Personal information
- Full name: Raymond Jerome Cazeaux
- Date of birth: 18 February 1882
- Place of birth: Stoke Newington, England
- Date of death: 1 June 1957 (aged 75)
- Position: Forward

Senior career*
Years	Team	Apps	(Gls)
1902–1904	Athletic Club		
1903–1907	Bromley		
- * Club domestic league appearances and goals

Raymond Jerome Cazeaux (18 February 1882 – 1 June 1957) was an English footballer who played as a forward for Athletic Club and Bromley.

He was one of the most important footballers in the amateur beginnings of Athletic Club, netting a goal in both the 1902 Copa de la Coronación final and the 1903 Copa del Rey final, the club's first trophies. Cazeaux was previously believed to have been a Frenchman named Armand, a mistake that persisted through time until an investigation published in El Correo in March 2023 uncovered the truth of his identity.

== Early life ==
Raymond Cazeaux was born in Stoke Newington as the son of Margaret Sturgeon and Louis Joseph Edouard Cazeaux, a French-born merchant, also of Spanish descent, who had lived in England since the late 1860s. As a young man, he spent time in Bilbao, visiting an older brother who had been seconded to a local engineering company and eventually settled in the area.

== Playing career ==
During his time in Bilbao, Cazeaux joined the newly created Bizcaya – a combination of players from Athletic Club and Bilbao FC – in 1902, which evolved into the extant Athletic Club shortly after.

Together with Juan Astorquia, Alejandro de la Sota and Walter Evans, he was part of the teams that won the 1902 Copa de la Coronación (as Bizcaya) and the 1903 Copa del Rey, contributing the decisive goal of a 2–1 win over FC Barcelona in the 1902 final, and scoring again in a 3–2 comeback win over Madrid FC in the 1903 final. He was also among the registered players for the 1904 Copa del Rey, in which Athletic were declared winners without playing a match after their opponents failed to show up in a dispute over registration. Between 1902 and 1903, Cazeaux played five competitive matches, in which he scored three goals (Athletic Bilbao counts the matches played by Bizcaya as its own).

Cazeaux eventually settled in the Bromley area, where he began to play football for Bromley F.C., organising friendly matches between them and Athletic in 1913, a year in which he also appeared again for the Basque club as a guest player. His younger brother Victor played for SC Germania Hamburg in the 1904 German football championship.

== Later life ==
Outside football, Cazeaux worked mostly in the trading industry and served with the British Royal Field Artillery in the First World War.

== Honours ==
- Copa de la Coronación: 1902
- Copa del Rey: 1903, 1904
