= Luis Márquez (footballer, born 1876) =

Spanish footballer (1876–1930)

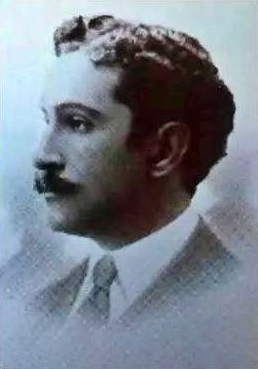

1st President of Athletic club
- In office 1902–1903
- Succeeded by: Juan Astorquia

Personal details
- Born: 1876 Moguer, Huelva, Spain
- Died: 1930 (aged 53–54) Bilbao, Spain
Association football career
- Full name: Luis Márquez Marmolejo
- Position: Forward
Senior career*
Years	Team	Apps	(Gls)
1898–1904	Athletic Club		
- * Club domestic league appearances and goals

Luis Márquez Marmolejo (1876 – 1930) was a Spanish football executive who was the first-ever president of Athletic Club. He is regarded as one of the most important figures in the amateur beginnings of Athletic Club, being among the seven founders of the club in 1898, and then serving the club as its first president between 1901 and 1902, when he was replaced by Juan Astorquia.

== Foundation of Athletic ==
Márquez was born in the Huelva town of Moguer in 1876. He married Magdalena Moral, from Alava. He worked in Bilbao as a commercial employee in various companies, including the Cementos Cosmos company, where he worked as an administrative manager.

As a young man he developed an interest in football after watching some football games between British workers at the Hippodrome of Lamiako next to Bilbao, and like many other Bilbainos, he began to play this new sport in Lamiako, notably with six students belonging to the Gymnasium Zamacois: Juan Astorquia, Alejandro Acha, Fernando and Pedro Iraolagoitia, Enrique Goiri and Eduardo Montejo. In 1898, the idea of founding a football society came out of those games, and they opened a practice center in Lamiako, thus unofficially founding the Athletic Club (using the English spelling). Although they were founded in 1898, Athletic Club de Bilbao was not officially established until 5 September 1901, in a meeting held in the Café San Gervasio de Cassolas, in which they formalized the first board of directors with Márquez being named the club's first-ever president. On the other hand, Juan Astorquia was named the club's first-ever captain, and it was he who took over from Luis Márquez in 1902.

== Death ==
Márquez died in Bilbao in 1930 at the age of 54.

== See also ==
History of Athletic Bilbao
