= Bizcaya (football team) =

Football club in Spain active 1897 to 1903

Club Bizcaya
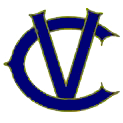
- Full name: Club Bizcaya
- Founded: 1897; 129 years ago
- Dissolved: 1903; 123 years ago
- Ground: Tiro del Pichón, Madrid
- League: Copa de la Coronación
- 1902: Champion
Home colours

Bizcaya, also known as Bizcaya FC or Club Bizcaya (Vizcaya in Spanish) was an association football representative team from Bilbao, Spain, which participated in the 1902 Copa de la Coronación and the 1907 Copa del Rey, winning the former. In this respect, the team is similar to London XI. It was intended to create a team especially for the tournament using the best players from each Bilbao-based club: Bilbao Football Club and Athletic Club in 1902, and Athletic Club and Unión Vizcaino in 1907.

== History ==
=== Origins ===
At the end of 1901, the two most important clubs in the city were Athletic Club and Bilbao FC, and thus, a rivalry soon arose between them, playing several friendlies at the Hippodrome of Lamiako, which the two teams shared since there were hardly any fields in Bilbao. Their duels aroused great expectation and served as one of the drivers of football as a mass phenomenon in Bilbao, but despite the sporting rivalry between them, their relations were friendly, and thus, the two rivals agreed to join the best players of each club to play two games against the Bordeaux-based side Burdigala at Burdeos. This temporary merge became known as Club Bizcaya (with a B), and the results were 0–2 in France, the first time a Bilbao team played on foreign territory, and 7–0 in Lamiako, the very first visit by a foreign team to Bilbao, gathering a crowd of three thousand spectators, a tremendous amount at the time. In France on 9 March 1902, the goals were netted by Ramón Silva and Walter Evans. Three weeks later, on 31 March 1902, Bizcaya played the return fixture at home, trashing the French side with a resounding 7–0 victory with a poker from William Dyer and a hat-trick from Juan Astorquia. Lamiako had its record attendance on that day, gathering a crowd of three thousand spectators, a tremendous amount at the time.

=== Copa de la Coronación 1902 ===
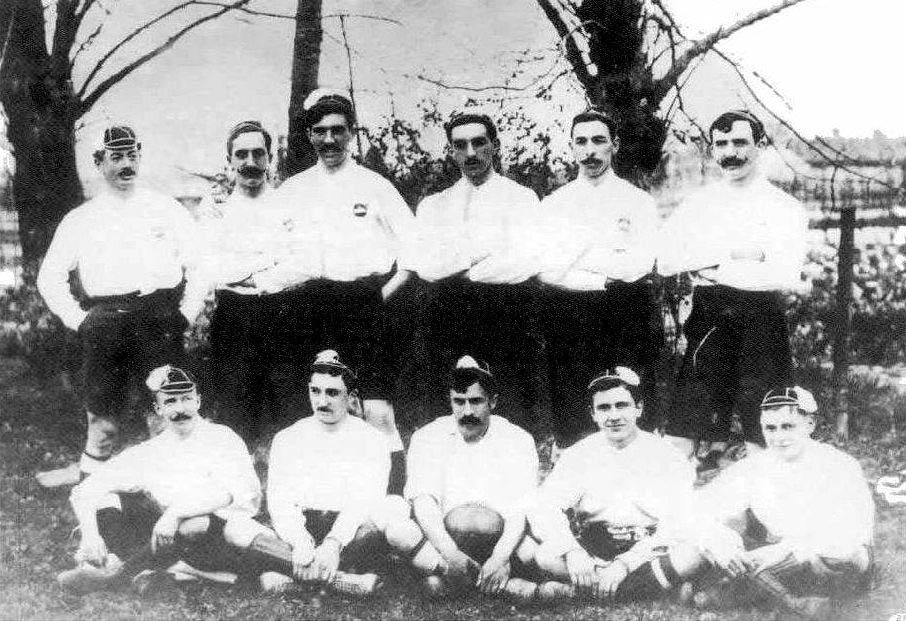
Team of Bizcaya of 1902. That year the club would win the 1902 Copa de la Coronación

Taking advantage of the occasion of the coronation of Alfonso XIII, the president of Madrid FC (now known as Real Madrid) Juan Padrós, decided to sponsor and include a football tournament in the royal program that was being arranged for the coronation festivities in May in the Spanish capital, and thus the Copa de la Coronación was born, the first national championship disputed in Spain and the forerunner for the Copa del Rey which began in the following year. Following an invitation from Madrid FC, it was decided that Club Bizcaya would be sent to Madrid to represent the city of Bilbao, being one of the 5 teams that participated in the Copa de la Coronación. The then Athletic president Juan Astorquia was named the team's captain.

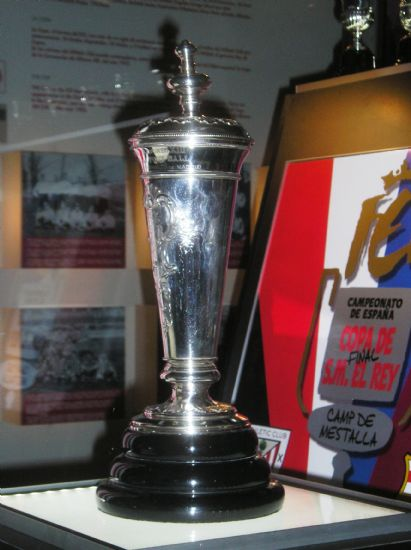
The Copa de la Coronación trophy won by Bizcaya, on display in the Athletic Bilbao museum

The Basques played and won three games on consecutive days, thrashing Club Español (now known as RCD Espanyol) 5–1 in the quarter-finals with goals from captain Astorquia of Athletic, and Dyer and Walter Evans (3) of Bilbao FC. Dyer scored with a penalty in what was perhaps the first-ever competitive penalty taken in Spain, while Evans scored a hat-trick in what was perhaps the first-ever competitive hat-trick netted in Spain. In the semi-finals, Bizcaya defeated New FC with a resounding 8–1 win thanks to a poker from Dyer, a brace from Evans, and a goal each from Astorquia and Raymond Cazeaux. Finally, they faced Joan Gamper's FC Barcelona in the final at the Hipódromo de la Castellana on 15 May 1902, where captain Astorquia led by example, netting the opening goal of the final in the early stages of the game, with Cazeaux scoring also in the first half in a 2–1 win, thus claiming the trophy presented by the mayor of Madrid and returning to Bilbao with it. Bilbao still has that trophy in their trophy room at the San Mamés stadium.

On 24 March 1903, Bilbao FC and its associates were officially and definitively absorbed by Athletic Club.

=== Copa del Rey 1907 ===
The 1907, Club Bizcaya was "reactivated" by combining the best players from Athletic Club and Unión Vizcaino, for the sole purpose of participating in the 1907 Copa del Rey. Bizcaya made their second debut on 24 March against Madrid FC, winning 3–2 thanks to goals from Charles Simmons (2) and Juan Goyoaga. The tournament was a five-team league, of which Bizcaya and Madrid FC finished as joint winners, meaning a play-off had to be played on 30 March, which Madrid won 1–0 courtesy of a late goal from Manuel Prast.

== Results ==
Club Bizcaya

| 9 March 1902 | Burdigala | 0–2 | Club Bizcaya | Burdeos, France |
| ? | Kuber; Boyer, Balade; Sudraud, Sarrailh, Paillre; Cornali, Cahiol, Sergenton, Giraud, Cabanol | Report | Ramón Silva; Walter Evans L. Arana; Larrañaga, Ugalde; A. Arana, Careaga, J. A. Arana; Sota, R. Silva, Dyer, Astorquia, Evans | Referee: Denis |

| 31 March 1902 | Club Bizcaya | 7–0 | Burdigala | Hippodrome of Lamiako, Biscay |
| 15:30 | William Dyer; Juan Astorquia L. Arana; Mills, Larrañaga; L. Silva, J. Eguren, A. Arana; Evans, R. Silva, Dyer, Astorquia, Goiri | Report | Kuhn; Ricard, Giraud; Peyre, Paillere, Mendes; Rabaud, Guillocheau, Dumas, Kraus, Sudraud | Referee: Raine |

| 13 May 1902 1902 Copa de la Coronación quarter-finals | Club Bizcaya | 5–1 | Club Español | Hipódromo, Madrid |
| | Juan Astorquia; Walter Evans; William Dyer (-) | Report1; Report2 | Ángel Ponz | Referee: (England) Samuel Morris |

| 14 May 1902 1902 Copa de la Coronación Semi-finals | Club Bizcaya | 8–1 | New Foot-Ball Club | Hipódromo, Madrid |
| | Walter Evans; Raymond Cazeaux; William Dyer; Juan Astorquia | Report1; Report2 | Montojo | Referee: (England) Samuel Morris |

| 15 May 1902 1902 Copa de la Coronación Final | Club Bizcaya | 2–1 | FC Barcelona | Hipódromo, Madrid |
| | Juan Astorquia 10'; Raymond Cazeaux 20' | Athletic; RSSSF bdfutbol | John Parsons 75' | Referee: (Spain) Carlos Padrós |

== Honours ==
Copa de la Coronación

- Champions: 1902

Copa del Rey

- Runners-up: 1907

== See also ==
- Athletic–Barcelona clásico
- El Viejo Clásico
