= Walter Evans (Bilbao footballer) =

English footballer

Personal information
- Date of birth: Unknown
- Place of birth: England
- Position: Striker

Senior career*
Years	Team	Apps	(Gls)
1901–1902	Bilbao FC		
1902	Club Bizcaya		
1903–1904	Athletic Club		
- * Club domestic league appearances and goals

Walter Evans was an English footballer who played as a striker for Athletic Club. He was one of the first pioneers of football in the Basque Country, standing out as a great striker for some of the earliest Basque clubs in existence such as Bilbao FC, Club Bizcaya, and Athletic Club, winning three back-to-back Spanish Cups between 1902 and 1904, and being the joint top scorer in the 1902 Copa de la Coronación with 5 goals. The dates of his birth and death are unknown.

== Playing career ==
=== Bilbao Football Club ===
Evans was born in England and at some point, at the turn of the century, he arrived in Bilbao due to work reasons. In 1901, together with fellow Englishmen, George Langford, George Cockram and William Dyer, he was one of the young English workers and residents in Bilbao who joined the recently established Bilbao Football Club. At the end of 1901, the two most important clubs in the city were Bilbao FC and Athletic Club, so a rivalry soon arose between them, and they played several friendlies at the Hippodrome of Lamiako. Evans played a fundamental role in this historic rivalry, netting a total of three goals in four matches, including one in a 1–1 draw on 1 December 1901 and the only goal in a 1–0 win on 15 December, thus sealing Bilbao FC's first-ever win over their city rivals.

On 19 January 1902, Evans scored a consolation goal in a 4–2 loss, in a match that went down in history as the first time that a paid match was held in Biscay, since they charged a ticket price of 30 cents of a peseta. Evans was what would now be called a quality footballer and was perhaps the club's most talented footballer.

=== Club Bizcaya ===
The two rivals agreed to join the best players of each club to play two games against the Bordeaux-based side Burdigala. This temporary merge became known as Club Bizcaya, and Evans ousted Athletic's forwards for a spot in the first-ever line-up of the Bizcaya team against Burdigala on 9 March, netting once in a 2–0 win in France, the first time a Bilbao team played on foreign territory, and three weeks later, on 31 March 1902, he was again in Bizcaya's starting XI for the return fixture at home in a 7–0 win over the French side.

Together with Juan Astorquia, Armand Cazeaux and fellow Englishman William Dyer, Evans was part of the Bizcaya team that participated in the 1902 Copa de la Coronacion, the first national championship disputed in Spain and the forerunner for the Copa del Rey. In the quarter-finals on 13 May, he scored a hat-trick against Club Espanyol (now RCD Espanyol) to help his side to a 5–1 win. On the following day, Evans netted a brace in the semi-finals in an 8–1 trashing of New Foot-Ball Club, thus helping Athletic reach the final, in which he started in a 2–1 victory over FC Barcelona. These five goals earned him the top spot in the top scorers of the tournament alongside his teammate William Dyer, who also scored five goals for Biscaya.

=== Athletic Club ===
In 1903, Bilbao FC collapsed and its remaining members were officially absorbed by Athletic Club. Together with Juan Astorquia, Alejandro de la Sota, and fellow Englishman George Cockram, Evans was part of the Athletic team that participated in the 1903 Copa del Rey, the first-ever official edition of the competition. In the semifinals, he scored once to help his side to a 4–1 win over Club Espanyol, and in the final against Madrid FC, the game was tied at 2–2 in the 80th minute when Evans provided the game-winning assist to de la Sota with "a beautiful play", thus contributing decisively in a 3–2 comeback victory. Evans played five competitive matches and scored six competitive goals for Athletic between 1902 and 1905 (Athletic Bilbao counts the matches played by Club Vizcaya as its own). He was also part of the team that won the 1904 Copa del Rey, which Athletic won without playing a single match since their opponents failed to turn up.

== Honours ==
Club Bizcaya

- Copa de la Coronación: 1902

Athletic Club

- Copa del Rey: 1903, 1904
