= 1903 Copa del Rey =

1st Copa del Rey

Tournament details
- Country: Spain
- Teams: 3

Final positions
- Champions: Athletic Bilbao (1st title)
- Runners-up: Madrid FC

Tournament statistics
- Matches played: 3
- Goals scored: 14 (4.67 per match)
- Top goal scorer(s): (Spain) Juan Astorquia (Spain) Armando Giralt (Spain) Alejandro de la Sota (2 goals each)

The Copa del Rey 1903 was the first official staging of the Copa del Rey, the Spanish football cup competition. It followed the 1902 Copa de la Coronación, held to celebrate the coronation of King Alfonso XIII of Spain, which was won by Club Vizcaya de Bilbao (a temporary combination of Bilbao Football Club and Athletic Bilbao) and given to them permanently.

== Details ==
The competition was played between 6 and 8 April 1903. Three teams took part: Athletic Bilbao, Espanyol of Barcelona and Madrid FC. It took the form of a round-robin, but the results of the first two games meant that the third game became the final. That match, held at the Hipódromo in Madrid, saw Athletic Bilbao take the trophy for the first time as a distinct club, beating Madrid 3–2 after trailing 2–0 at half time.

As a result, the tally of Copa wins by Athletic Bilbao is disputed. The 1902 cup, won by Club Vizcaya, is on display in the Athletic museum, and the club includes the victory in its honours list. However, neither the Liga de Fútbol Profesional (LFP) nor the Real Federación Española de Fútbol (RFEF) official statistics include this as an Athletic win: they count the 1903 cup as its first.

== Results ==
=== Day 1 ===
6 April 1903

RCD Espanyol	1–4	Madrid FC
Joaquim Cenarro	Report	Armando Giralt; Armando Giralt; José Giralt; Pedro Parages

Hipódromo, Madrid
Referee: (Spain) Juan Astorquia (Athletic Bilbao)

=== Day 2 ===
7 April 1903

Athletic Bilbao	4–0	RCD Espanyol
Juan Astorquia; Alejandro de la Sota; Walter Evans	Report

Hipódromo, Madrid
Referee: (Spain)

=== Day 3 (Final) ===
8 April 1903

Athletic Bilbao	3–2	Madrid FC
Raymond Cazeaux 55'; Eduardo Montejo 70'; Alejandro de la Sota 80'	Report	de Valdeterrazo 15'; Antonio Neyra 40'

Hipódromo, Madrid
Referee: (Spain) José María Soler

Copa del Rey 1903 Winners
Athletic Bilbao
1st Title
