= William Dyer (footballer) =

Spanish footballer

Personal information
- Full name: William Llewellyn Dyer
- Date of birth: 11 September 1883
- Place of birth: Sunderland, County Durham, England
- Date of death: 1936 (aged 52)
- Place of death: Saint-Jean-de-Luz, Pyrénées-Atlantiques, France
- Position: Striker

Senior career*
| Years | Team | Apps | (Gls) |
| 1901–1902 | Bilbao FC | | |
| 1902 | Club Bizcaya | | |
| 1902–1904 | Athletic Club | | |
- * Club domestic league appearances and goals

William Llewellyn Dyer (11 September 1883 – 1936) was an English businessman and a professional footballer who played as a striker for Athletic Club. He was one of the first pioneers of football in the Basque Country, standing out as a great striker for some of the earliest Basque clubs in existence such as Bilbao FC, Club Bizcaya, and Athletic Club, winning three back-to-back Spanish Cups with the latter two between 1902 and 1904, and being the joint top scorer in the 1902 Copa de la Coronación with 5 goals.

In addition to being a notable football player, a sport to which he owes his career, he was also an outstanding athlete who also performed in other modalities such as sailing, cricket, tennis, and boxing, among other sports of the British bourgeoisie. His business with his shipments of iron and coal was going very well.

== Early life ==
Dyer was born in Sunderland on 11 September 1883. He arrived in Bilbao at the hands of his father, Sidney, who devoted himself to the mineral purchase business. After the death of his father, who had been Britain's honorary consul in Bilbao, he took over the family business while becoming involved in the town's affairs. Dyer became interested in bullfighting and participated in the creation of the Cocherito de Bilbao club, in honor of the local bullfighter Cástor Jaureguibeitia Ibarra.

== Playing career ==
=== Bilbao Football Club ===
In 1901, together with fellow Englishmen George Langford, George Cockram and Walter Evans, the 18-year-old Dyer was one of the young English workers and residents in Bilbao who joined the recently established Bilbao Football Club. At the end of 1901, the two most important clubs in the city were Bilbao FC and Athletic Club, so a rivalry soon arose between them, and they played several friendlies at the Hippodrome of Lamiako. Dyer was a key element in this historic rivalry that served as one of the drivers of football as a mass phenomenon in Bilbao, since their duels aroused great expectation. On 19 January 1902, in the match that went down in history as the first paid match held in Biscay since they charged a ticket price of 30 cents of a peseta, Dyer scored a consolation goal in a 2–4 loss.

=== Club Bizcaya ===
The two rivals agreed to join the best players of each club to play two games against the Bordeaux-based side Burdigala. This temporary merge became known as Club Bizcaya, and Dyer ousted Athletic's forwards for a spot in the first-ever line-up of the Bizcaya team against Burdigala on 9 March, helping his side to a 0–2 win in France, the first time a Bilbao team played on foreign territory. Three weeks later, on 31 March 1902, he was again in Bizcaya's starting XI for the return fixture at home, the first visit by a foreign team to Bilbao, and he netted four goals to help his side to a 7–0 win over the French side.

Together with Juan Astorquia, Armand Cazeaux and fellow Englishman Walter Evans, Dyer was part of the Club Bizcaya that participated in the 1902 Copa de la Coronacion, the first national championship disputed in Spain and the forerunner for the Copa del Rey. In the quarter-finals on 13 May, he scored against Club Espanyol (now RCD Espanyol) to help his side to a 5–1, doing it from the penalty spot, in what was perhaps the first-ever competitive penalty taken in Spain. On the following day, Dyer netted a poker in the semi-finals against New Foot-Ball Club in an 8–1 win, thus helping Athletic reach the final, in which he started in a 2–1 win over FC Barcelona. These five goals earned him the top spot in the top scorers of the tournament alongside his teammate Walter Evans, who also scored five goals for Athletic.

=== Athletic Club ===
In 1903, Bilbao FC collapsed and its remaining members were officially absorbed by Athletic Club. Dyer played four competitive matches for Athletic between 1902 and 1905, in which he scored five goals (Athletic Bilbao counts the matches played by Club Vizcaya as its own). He was part of the team that won the 1904 Copa del Rey, which Athletic won without playing a single match since their opponents failed to turn up. Together with Alejandro de la Sota and Hermenegildo García, he was part of the team that reached the 1905 Copa del Rey Final, starting in a 0–1 loss to Madrid FC (now Real Madrid), courtesy of a goal from Manuel Prast.

== Later life ==
Dyer created the Unión Ciclista Bilbaina, he was a sailor, a cricket and tennis player, he liked boxing and his business was also going very well with his shipments of iron and coal.

== Death ==
In 1936, shortly after the start of the Spanish Civil War, Dyer died in San Juan de Luz, at the age of 53. His son Patrick (born in 1916) was responsible for the English espionage service MI-16 in the Biscayan capital for over 20 years, notably during World War II, controlling the port movement of the Germans and collaborating with the Basque nationalist groups after the fall of Bilbao.

== Honours ==
Club Bizcaya

- Copa de la Coronación:
  - Winners: 1902

Athletic Club

- Copa del Rey:
  - Winners: 1904
  - Runner-up: 1905
