= Juan Astorquia =

Spanish footballer and sports leader (1876–1905)

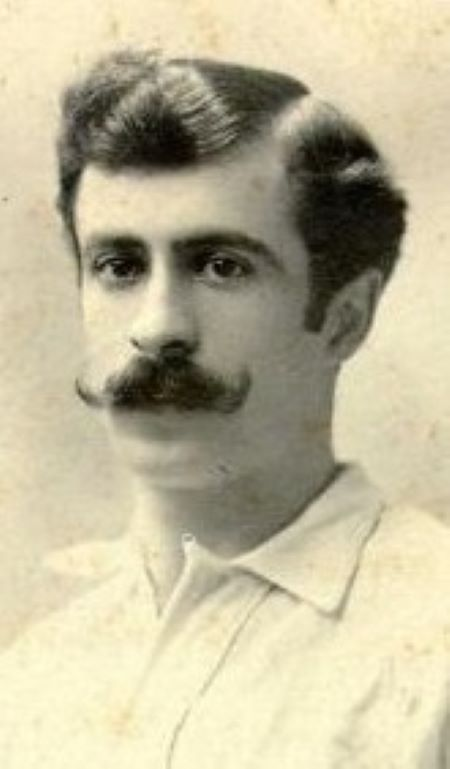
- Astorquia around 1902

Personal information
- Full name: Juan José Astorquia Landabaso
- Date of birth: June 1876
- Place of birth: Bilbao, Spain
- Date of death: 23 October 1905 (aged 29)
- Place of death: Bilbao, Spain
- Position: Forward

Senior career*
Years	Team	Apps	(Gls)
1901–1902	Athletic Club		
1902	Club Bizcaya		
1902–1904	Athletic Club		
2nd President of Athletic Bilbao
In office 1902–1903
Preceded by	Luis Márquez
Succeeded by	Enrique Careaga
- * Club domestic league appearances and goals

Juan "Juanito" José Astorquia Landabaso (June 1876 – 23 October 1905) was a Spanish footballer who played as a forward for Athletic Bilbao. He is widely regarded as one of the most important figures in the amateur beginnings of Athletic Club from Bilbao, having been the fundamental driving force behind the foundation of the club in 1898 and its official establishment in 1901, and then serving as the club's first captain until 1904 and as its second president between 1902 and 1903.

Under Astorquia's leadership, Athletic became a dominant team on the national level, captaining the Basque club to triumphs at the 1902 Copa de la Coronación, which was the club's first trophy, and then to back-to-back Copa del Rey titles in 1903 and 1904, contributing decisively in all of these victories. He also worked as a referee. A lover of sports, he was also a fan of sailing and velocipedism.

== Early life and education ==
Juan Astorquia was born in Bilbao in June 1876, and as the son of a well-off family of merchants, he was sent to Britain to complete his studies, doing so in a Catholic college in Manchester. During his four years there, he developed an interest in football, becoming one of the best players in his school thanks to his dribbles and ball control.

== Footballing career ==
=== Early career ===
In 1896, the 20-year-old Astorquia returned to Bilbao, bringing with him his newly-acquired business knowledge and passion for football, and like many other Bilbaínos, he began to play football in the Hippodrome of Lamiako in Leioa, which at the time was the home of organized football in Biscay. At first, he became a member of an informal group led by Carlos and Manuel Castellanos, the so-called Bilbao Football Club, playing a key role in setting up meetings between them and the workers from the Nervión shipyards. Soon after, however, Astorquia left the club due to his failure to get along with some members of Bilbao FC; the exact reasons behind this decision remain unclear, perhaps it was because he disliked the massive presence of Britons within the club as he wanted to belong to a society with more local representation, or perhaps he was simply eager to lead a club by himself where he could play a greater role. Either way, he went on to become the head of a seven-man committee that founded what would later become Bilbao's first official football club.

A lover of sports, Astorquia also enjoyed both gymnastics and cycling, thus joining both the Gimnásio Zamacois (founded in 1879) and the Bilbao Velocipedista Club (founded in 1885).

=== Foundation of Athletic ===
In 1898, Astorquia, together with six fellow Basque football enthusiasts and Lamiako regulars who also belonged to the Gimnásio Zamacois, (Note: the seven are Juan Astorquia, Alejandro Acha, Luis Márquez, Fernando and Pedro Iraolagoitia, Enrique Goiri and Eduardo Montejo.) decided to open a football practice center in Lamiako. The club's main sources of recruitment soon became the Gimnásio Zamacois, the largest sports center in Bilbao at that time, and the Velocipedista Club, where Astorquia maintained contacts due to his militancy as a member. Once they had a sufficient number of volunteers, he began to organize football matches against the British workers, which were contested on Sundays in Lamiako. Unlike Bilbao FC, this group of football pioneers was almost entirely made up of players from Biscay, including some newcomers who had come over from cycling.

Although it was founded in 1898, it was not until February 1901, in a meeting held at the Café García, that Astorquia's group, now larger, began conversations to become an official football club. To achieve this result, a commission made up of Astorquia, Goiri, and José María Barquín was formed to prepare regulations for a football society, which were approved on 11 June. The entity's board was subsequently elected, with Astorquia being appointed the team's captain, while Alfred Mills, the only foreigner to be part of the board, was named the vice-captain. Since the figure of coach as we know it today did not exist at the time, it was Astorquia and Mills, as captains of the clubs, who were in charge of making up the line-ups and dictating the tactics to be followed.

After obtaining the permission of the Civil Government, the club was officially established on 5 September 1901, in the meeting held at Café García, in which a group of 33 football pioneers, including Astorquia and his brother, Luis, signed the documents to make it official, and hence Athletic Club was born.

=== First games and first goals ===
At the end of 1901, the two most important clubs in the city were Astorquia's Athletic Club and Castellanos' Bilbao FC, so they inevitably developed a rivalry between them, playing several friendlies at the Hippodrome of Lamiako, which the two teams shared since there were hardly any fields in Bilbao. Astorquia was one of the most important figures in what is now regarded as one of the first football rivalries in Spain, one that helped turn football into a mass phenomenon in Bilbao since their duels aroused great expectation.

Astorquia stood out for his goal scoring prowess; for instance, on 19 January 1902, he netted a brace to help his side to a 4–2 win, which not only marked Athletic's first victory over Bilbao FC in four matches, but also the first time that a paid match was held in Biscay, since they charged a ticket price of 30 cents of a peseta.

=== Club Bizcaya ===
In 1902, Astorquia became the club's second president, taking over from Luis Márquez, who had been elected on 11 June 1901. Under Astorquia's presidency, the two rivals agreed to join the best players of each club to play two games against the Bordeaux-based side Burdigala. This temporary merge became known as Club Bizcaya, with Astorquia being the only Spanish player in Bizcaya's attacking quintet, with Bilbao FC's English forwards (George Langford, William Dyer, William Butwell and Walter Evans) making out the rest.

On 9 March 1902, Astorquia played in the first-ever line-up of the Bizcaya team against Burdigala, helping his side to a 0–2 win in France, the first time a Bilbao team played on foreign territory, and three weeks later, on 31 March 1902, he was again in Bizcaya's starting XI for the return fixture at home, the first visit by a foreign team to Bilbao; Lamiako had its record attendance on that day. Astorquia scored a hat-trick to help his side to a 7–0 win over the French side. Following these two victories, the French newspaper L'Auto (currently known as L'Équipe) described Bizcaya as "best team in Spain".

=== Copa de la Coronacion ===
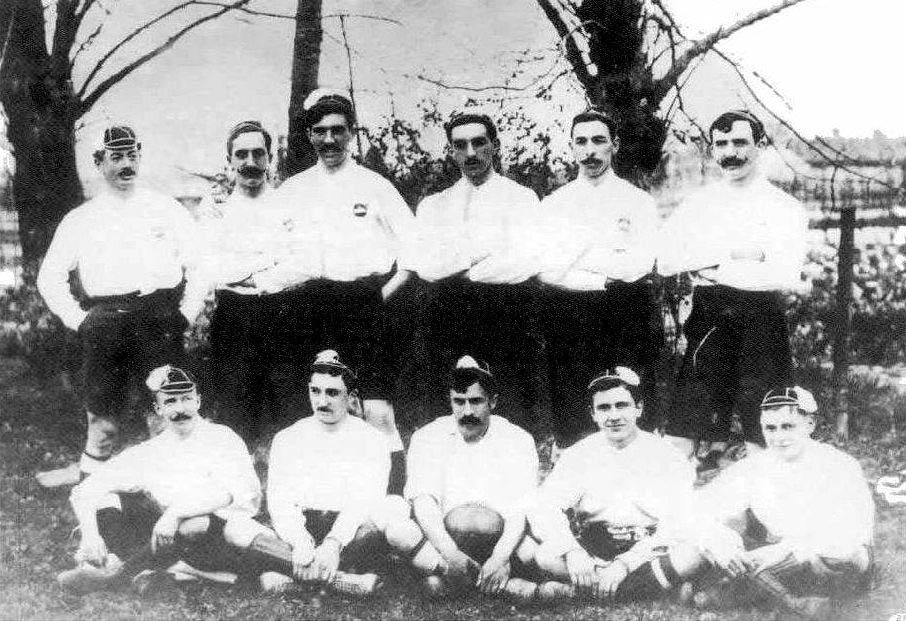
Astorquia (center, with the ball) in 1902.

Together with Alejandro de la Sota, Raymond Cazeaux, Dyer and Evans, he was part of the Bizcaya team that participated in the 1902 Copa de la Coronacion, the first national championship disputed in Spain and the forerunner for the Copa del Rey. In the build-up for the tournament, however, Athletic and Bilbao FC could not agree on whether to go together or separately, so Astorquia wrote and signed a note to the capital stating that "For reasons beyond Vizcaya's control, [...] No Club [from Bilbao] is registered for the competition", but thanks to the intervention from Carlos Padrós of Madrid FC, the Basques participated as Bizcaya.

Astorquia captained his team in the tournament and he led by example, netting three goals, one in each game he played: the quarter-finals against Club Español (5–1), in the semifinals against New Foot-Ball Club (8–1), and the opening goal of the final in a 2–1 win over Joan Gamper's FC Barcelona, thus contributing decisively in Athletic's very first piece of silverware. According to some sources, Astorquia netted the opening goal of the game against Español, thus being the author of the very first goal in Copa del Rey history, but due to the little statistical rigor that the newspapers had at that time, the exact order of the goals is unknown, and this feat is more often attributed to Español's Ángel Ponz, while Athletic's first competitive goal is attributed to either Astorquia or Evans.

Astorquia then used Bizcaya's successful campaign at the Copa de la Coronación to convince the newly-elected president of Bilbao FC Luis Arana of how beneficial and necessary it was to merge the two clubs permanently, and in order to further convince them of the merger, he promised to pass down the torch of the presidency to a Bilbao FC associate, Enrique Careaga. The sudden death of Carlos Castellanos in 1903, at the age of just 22, precipitated the outcome of the negotiations, with the final agreement being signed by both presidents on 29 March. Bilbao FC was thus dissolved and all of its remaining members and associates were officially absorbed by Athletic, which became known as Athletic Club de Bilbao. The merging was spearheaded by Astorquia, who thus become the first president of Athletic Club de Bilbao for a few weeks until being replaced by Careaga. Between 1901 and 1903, Astorquia was simultaneously Athletic's founder, player, captain (equivalent to coach), and president, performing all four tasks expertly.

=== Copa del Rey triumphs ===
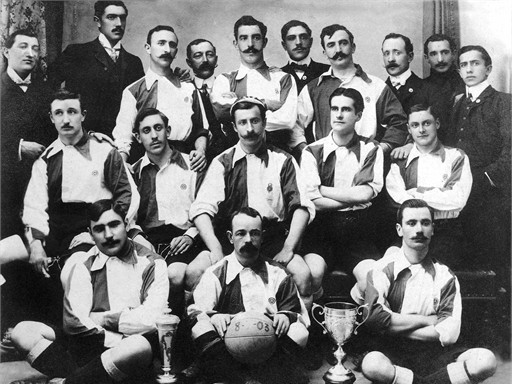
Astorquia (center, with the ball) in 1903.

Still under Astorquia's presidency and captaincy, and together with De la Sota, Cazeaux, and Evans, the newly created Athletic team won the first-ever Copa del Rey in 1903, in which he also contributed decisively, netting a brace in the semi-final against Espanyol (4–0); in the final at the Castellana racetrack, Athletic found themselves 2–0 down to Madrid FC at half-time, but after an inspirational address by Astorquia during the break, the Athletic players pulled off a comeback in the second half, capturing a 3–2 victory over the home team in front of 5,000 spectators. As the captain and president of the club, Astorquia felt obliged to take a step forward and gather the players around him in the Biscayan locker room to give them a harangue. Its exact content is unknown due to the absence of recording devices, but according to the chroniclers of the time it ended with a war cry: Por el Athletic y por Bilbao ("For Athletic and for Bilbao"). With two goals in two matches, he was the tournament's joint-top scorer alongside teammate De la Sota and Madrid's Armando Giralt.

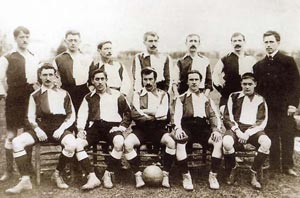
Astorquia (center, with the ball) in 1904.

Astorquia was also part of the team that won the 1904 Copa del Rey, which Athletic won without playing a single match since their opponents failed to turn up. On the eve of the final in Madrid, the newly-arrived group from Bilbao were asked to wait for a few days until the Madrid champion was decided, but Astorquia was quick to refuse to do so. Therefore, under the protection of the regulations, he and his team showed up at 11:00 at Español de Madrid's ground to play the final, eventually being declared champions due to the opponent's failure to appear. Then they sang the alirón and returned home.

Between 1902 and 1904, Astorquia played five competitive matches, scoring five goals (Athletic Bilbao counts the matches played by Bizcaya as its own). Although little is known about his playing style and personality on the pitch, the few photographs of the Athletic squads provide good hints with little likelihood of misinterpretation since he is invariably seen holding the ball and with an imposing and challenging gaze, a stark contrast with most of his teammates.

=== Refereeing career ===
Astorquia participated in the 1903 Copa del Rey as both a player and a referee, winning the cup as the former and overseeing one match as the latter, a semifinal clash between Madrid FC and Espanyol, which ended in a 4–1 win for Madrid.

== Outside football ==
In 1902, Astorquia appeared in the membership lists of both the Real Club Marítimo del Abra and the Real Sporting Club yachting societies (these entities merged under a compound name in 1972), as Member No. 115 and No. 120 respectively. Astorquia and many other members of Athletic and Bilbao FC were among the founding members of Marítimo del Abra, including fellow Athletic presidents Luis Márquez, Ramón Aras, Pedro de Astigarraga and De la Sota.

== Death ==
Juanito Astorquia died on 23 October 1905 at the age of 29, the same young age as Pichichi who also became a legend of Athletic Club and Basque football a generation later.

== Honours ==
Club Bizcaya

- Copa de la Coronación: 1902

Athletic Club

- Copa del Rey: 1903 and 1904
