= 1902 Copa de la Coronación =

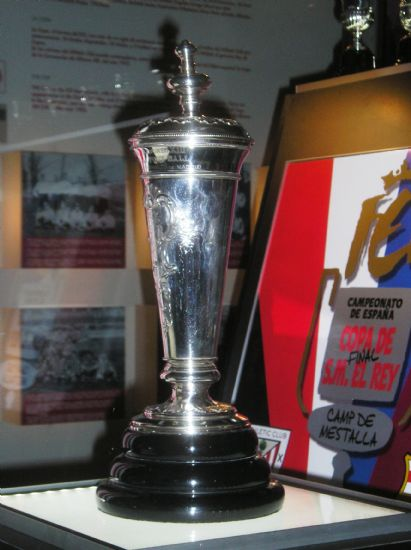
- The trophy on display in the Athletic Bilbao museum

Tournament details
- Country: Spain
- Teams: 5

Final positions
- Champions: Bizcaya
- Runners-up: FC Barcelona

Tournament statistics
- Matches played: 5
- Goals scored: 27 (5.4 per match)
- Top goal scorer(s): (England) Walter Evans (England) William Dyer (5 goals each)

The 1902 Copa de la Coronación (Coronation Cup in English) was a football competition in honour of the coronation of Alfonso XIII of Spain. The Royal Spanish Football Federation does not recognize it as the first season of the Copa del Rey, which began the following year.

The competition was thought up after Carlos Padrós, later president of Madrid FC, suggested a football competition to celebrate the coronation of Alfonso XIII. Four other teams joined Madrid for the first competition: FC Barcelona, Club Español de Foot-Ball, Bizcaya (a combination of Athletic Club and Bilbao Football Club) and New Foot-Ball Club. The competition featured the first recorded game between Barcelona and Madrid FC, with the former emerging as 3–1 winners, courtesy of goals from Udo Steinberg and Joan Gamper.

Carlos Padrós was also the referee of the final, held at the Hipódromo in Madrid, in which Bizcaya lifted the trophy after beating Barcelona 2–1.

== Quarterfinal ==
13 May 1902

Bizcaya	5–1	Club Español
Juan Astorquia; Walter Evans; William Dyer (-)	Report	Ángel Ponz

Hipódromo, Madrid
Referee: (England) Samuel Morris (FC Barcelona)

== Semifinals ==
13 May 1902

FC Barcelona	3–1	Madrid FC
Udo Steinberg; Joan Gamper (-)	Report	Arthur Johnson

Hipódromo, Madrid
Referee: (Spain) Luis Arana

14 May 1902

Bizcaya	8–1	New Foot-Ball Club
Walter Evans; Armand Cazeaux; William Dyer; Juan Astorquia	Report	Montojo

Hipódromo, Madrid
Referee: (England) Samuel Morris (FC Barcelona)

== Final ==
15 May 1902

Bizcaya	2–1	FC Barcelona
Juan Astorquia 10'; Armand Cazeaux 20'	RSSSF; CIHEFE bdfutbol	John Parsons 75'

Hipódromo, Madrid
Referee: (Spain) Carlos Padrós Madrid FC

Note: Some sources list Udo Steinberg as the goalscorer of Barcelona's consolation goal.

Copa de la Coronación 1902 Winners
Bizcaya
1st Title

== Consolation Trophy / Copa de la Gran Peña ==
Originally, this was to feature the four clubs aside from Copa de la Coronación winners Bizcaya in a knockout tournament.

However, New Foot-Ball Club had returned home after their crushing defeat to Bizcaya in the Copa de la Coronación, while FC Barcelona were forced to withdraw as their players had to return to their occupations, leaving them unable to field a team.

Therefore, the Gran Peña Cup was played as a single match between Madrid FC and Club Español.

16 May 1902

Madrid FC	3–2	Club Español
? ? ?		? ?

Hipódromo, Madrid
Referee: ?

== Statistics ==
=== Goalscorers ===
Rank	Player	Team	Goals
1	(England) Walter Evans	(Spain) Bizcaya	5
1	(England) William Dyer	(Spain) Bizcaya	5
2	(Spain) Juan Astorquia	(Spain) Bizcaya	3
3	(England) Raymond Cazeaux	(Spain) Bizcaya	2
3	(Germany) Udo Steinberg	(Spain) Barcelona FC	2

== Legacy ==
The Copa de la Coronación was the first national football tournament played in Spain, being organized as a punctual commemorative celebration. However, its success led to the organization of the first edition of the Copa del Rey the following year, then known as the Spanish Championship. Since then, it has been held on an annual basis. Due to this fact, the Copa de la Coronación is generally considered informally as the first edition of the Copa del Rey, although the Royal Spanish Football Federation does not recognize it as such.
