= 1904 Copa del Rey =

2nd Copa del Rey

Tournament details
- Country: Spain
- Teams: 4

Final positions
- Champions: Athletic Bilbao
- Runners-up: Club Español de Madrid

Tournament statistics
- Matches played: 3
- Goals scored: 15 (5 per match)

The Copa del Rey 1904 was the second staging of the Copa del Rey, the Spanish football cup competition.

The competition was played in 1904 in Madrid. It was notable for its chaotic development and the fact that Athletic Bilbao won the trophy without playing a game.

== Details ==
Originally, three teams were to participate, one for each region. The newly formed Madrid Football Federation, who organized the competition for the first time (the previous tournament was organized by Madrid CF), invited Athletic Bilbao representing Biscay and Espanyol of Barcelona representing Catalonia. Madrid was to be represented by the winner of a preliminary round between Club Español de Madrid and Madrid-Moderno (a merger of Madrid CF and Moderno). The three teams were to contest the cup in a round-robin format.

Before the tournament, Espanyol, unhappy with the competition system, announced they would not travel to Madrid. Then two more teams from Madrid, Moncloa FC and Iberia Football Club, were admitted into the competition, forcing a change to the schedule.

As a result, the four Madrid teams were scheduled to play a single-elimination tournament to decide their representative for the Copa del Rey final against the automatically qualified Athletic Bilbao.

The competition started on 13 March 1904, but on 19 March the first problems arose: the semi-final qualifying match between Club Español de Madrid and Madrid-Moderno ended in 5–5 draw. The captains of both teams agreed not to play extra-time, but failed to reach an agreement on when they should replay the match. Español wanted to play the next day, but Madrid-Moderno refused, citing the rules of the tournament which stated that a replay could not be played less than 48 hours after the previous game.

The next day, Club Español, went to replay the match, but Madrid-Moderno failed to appear. The regional federation, whose president Ceferino Avecilla also happened to be president of Español de Madrid, ruled in favour of Español, and they were declared winners on default.

While the Cup final was originally scheduled for 26 March, the inclusion of Moncloa and Iberia into the tournament at the last minute necessitated an extra qualifying game and delayed the final. On 27 March, Español and Moncloa faced one another, and Español were winning 1–0 when their defender Hermúa was injured, being diagnosed with a broken tibia and fibula. The referee then suspended the match, at which point Español claimed the victory. During a meeting of the Madrid Association of Foot-ball Clubs, the president of the organization, Avecilla, proposed to accept this claim, but as he was also the chairman of the claimant club, his proposal was rejected. To resolve this conflict, a lottery was held, which favoured Español, and named them as finalists.

But Español had not won their regional games: they had tied one game (winning the replay after their opponent failed to appear) and the other had been abandoned, which led Athletic to lodge a formal complaint. For various reasons, the Madrid Association were unable to quickly resolve the matter, and also faced a rush of players from the Basque club to return to their occupations: the Association decided to scratch the final and award the cup to Athletic as defending champions.

== Madrid qualifying tournament ==
=== Semi-finals ===
13 March 1904

| Moncloa Football Club | 4–0 | Iberia Football Club |
|---|---|---|
| ? ? ? ? |

Tiro del Pichón, Madrid
19 March 1904

| Club Español de Madrid | 5–5 | Madrid-Moderno |
|---|---|---|
| ? ? ? ? ? | | Joaquín Yarza; Pedro Parages; Federico Revuelto; Antonio Alonso |

Tiro del Pichón, Madrid

The replay was scratched and Español declared winners as Moderno failed to appear.

=== Final ===
25 March 1904

| Club Español de Madrid | 1–0 | Moncloa FC |
|---|---|---|
| ? |

Tiro del Pichón, Madrid

The match was abandoned at 1–0 due to a serious player injury; Español were declared winners.

== Copa del Rey Final ==
27 March 1904

| Athletic Bilbao | Not played | Club Español de Madrid |

Tiro del Pichón, Madrid

The qualification of Español was disputed; after much deliberation, and due to logisticial and various other issues, the Final was scratched and Athletic (who were not required to qualify) were awarded the Cup.

Copa del Rey 1904 Winners
Athletic Bilbao
2nd Title
