= Jorge Barrié =

Franco-Spanish industrial engineer, sports leader, and politician

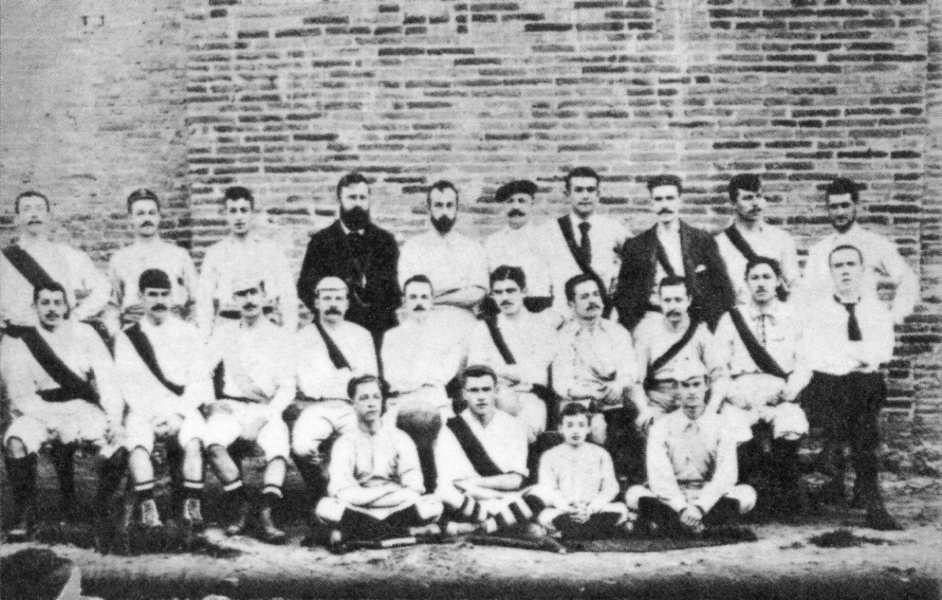
- Barrié (standing, third from the left) in 1893

1st President of the Spanish Tennis Federation
- In office 1909–1923
- Succeeded by: José Vidal-Ribas

Personal details
- Born: 23 September 1873 Bayonne, France
- Died: 7 September 1936 (aged 62) San Sebastián, Basque Country, Spain
Association football career
- Full name: Jorge de Satrústegui Barrié
- Position: Midfielder
Senior career*
Years	Team	Apps	(Gls)
1892–1894	Barcelona Football Club	+3	(+1)
1895	Sociedad de Foot-Ball de Barcelona	2	(1)
- * Club domestic league appearances and goals

Jorge de Satrústegui Barrié (23 September 1873 – 7 September 1936) was a Franco-Spanish industrial engineer, sports leader, and politician. A very active personality in everything related to the prosperity of San Sebastián, he was the founder and first president of the Royal Spanish Tennis Federation.

In his youth, he was also a footballer who played as a midfielder for some of the earliest Catalan clubs in existence such as Barcelona Football Club and Sociedad de Foot-Ball de Barcelona.

== Early life ==
Barrié was born in Bayonne on 23 September 1873 as the fourth and last son of Georgina Barrié Labrós (1839–1919) and of Patricio de Satrústegui y Bris, the second Barón de Satrústegui (1823–1888), belonging to one of the most notable families of the Navy Spanish merchant. His older brother Enrique Barrié inherited his father's title, thus becoming the third Barón de Satrústegui.

== Sporting career ==
=== Football career ===
While in Barcelona in the early 1890s, the teenager Barrié met James Reeves, who was recruiting football enthusiasts to create a well-organized football club, and Barrié joined him since he had been impressed by his passionate and entrepreneurial spirit. Together with Reeves and some other football pioneers in the city, such as the Morris (Jaime and Samuel), William MacAndrews, George Cochran, and fellow Catalan Alberto Serra, they formed the Barcelona Football Club in late 1892.

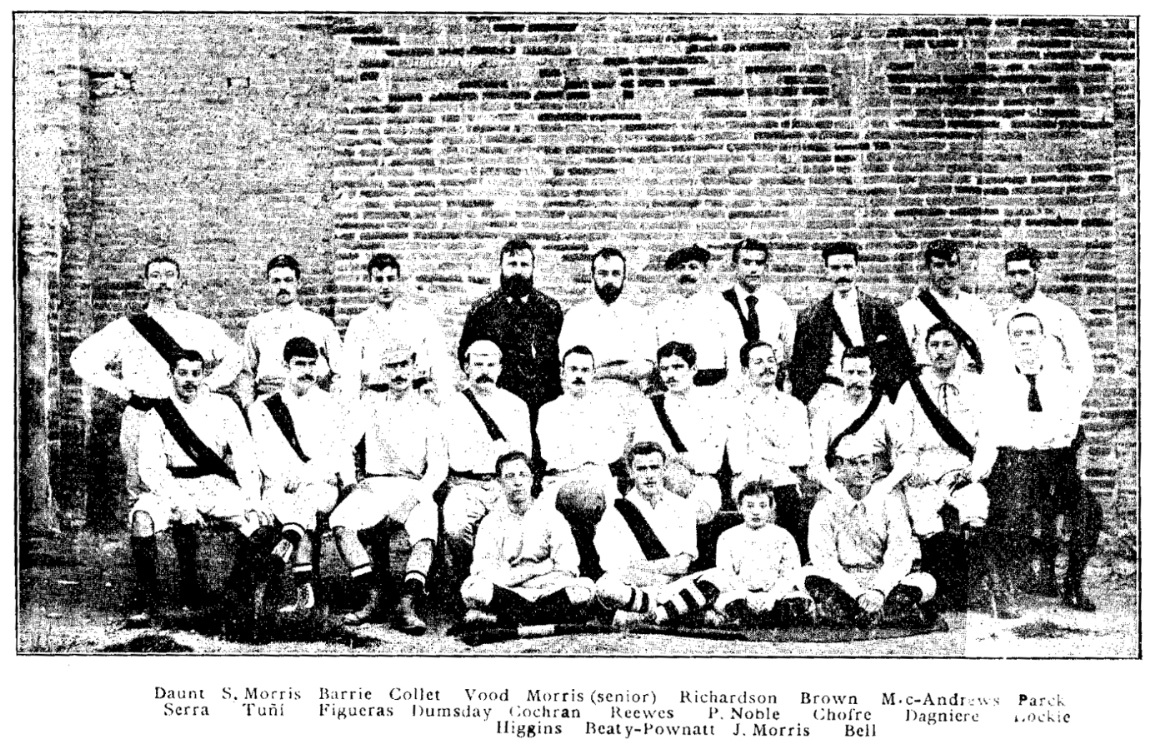
Barrié appears in the oldest image of a football team in Spain. He can be seen standing in the third row, the third from the left, in-between Samuel Morris and the referee Alfredo Collet.

This entity organized the first known football match in the city at Hippodrome of Can Tunis on 25 December 1892. It remains unclear if he played in this match. However, he did play on 12 March 1893, in the historic match between a blue and a red team, starting as a midfielder for the former and scoring the historic winner to seal a 2–1 victory. Barrié appears in what is regarded to be the oldest photograph of a football team in Spain, which depicts these two sides before the match at Can Tunis. He can be seen standing between Samuel Morris and the referee Alfredo Collet. In the picture, the youngest members of the group are seated on the floor in the first row, such as the 13-year-old Miguel Morris and the 18-year-old John Beaty-Pownall, but despite this, the then 19-year-old Barrié appears in the third row alongside Samuel Morris. This was most likely because Morris was a friend of his older brother, Enrique, and in fact, those two went on to found the Sociedad de Sport Vasco de Barcelona in 1906.

Barrié played several training matches (Blues vs Reds) at Can Tunis and a few others at Bonanova between 1892 and 1895, the last of which with Sociedad de Foot-Ball de Barcelona, however, due to the little statistical rigor that the newspapers had at that time, the exact number of matches and goals (if any) he performed is unknown. On 27 January 1895, he was one of 16 footballers who featured in the first football match played in Bonanova, helping the Blues to a 1–4 win over the Reds. On 24 March 1895, Barrié played for Barcelona as a midfielder against Torelló Foot-ball Association, which marked the first time that teams from two different cities played against each other in Catalonia, scoring once to help his side to an 8–3 victory. In the return fixture at Torelló, Barrié was replaced by a certain Heater, and without him, Barcelona lost 3–5.

=== Tennis career ===
On 11 September 1909, together with Luis de Uhagón of Madrid; Satrústegui Barrié and Rich of San Sebastian; Arthur Witty and Manuel Tey of Barcelona; Romero of Zaragoza, and Faulcombridge of Valencia, he founded the Lawn-Tennis Association of Spain, which would become the Royal Spanish Tennis Federation in 1940. He was then unanimously elected as the first president of the entity, a position that he held for 14 years until 1923, when he was replaced by José Vidal-Ribas. In 1920, Spain participated for the first time in the Olympic Games and Satrústegui Barrié's federation sent a delegation formed by his nephew Enrique de Satrústegui, Eduardo Flaquer and brothers José María and Manuel Alonso Areizaga, which reached the quarter-finals.

Satrústegui Barrié also founded the Real Club de Tenis de San Sebastián in 1904 in Ategorrieta. He even covered travel expenses for Spanish players to the United States from his own pocket, with his greatest interest being in taking Spain to the Davis Cup, something he achieved in 1921. Two years later he resigned from his position to take care of other more important duties.

=== Other sports ===
Barrié was one of the first polo players in Spain. He also played cricket, field hockey, golf, and Basque pelota, and was a motorsport enthusiast.

He promoted horse racing, winning several awards. He loved rowing so deeply that he represented it on the Olympic Committee.

== Politic career ==
In 1905, Barrié was deputy mayor of the San Sebastián City Council, and four years later mayor of the city, replacing the Marquis of Rocaverde. In 1915, Barrié was a Maurist provincial deputy representing the Patriotic Union for Gipuzkoa, being elected for the district of San Sebastián in May 1915, which was renewed in 1919.

Barrié was president of the Public Works Commission from 1919 to 1922. In 1927 he was appointed member of the Primoriverista National Assembly in its "communications and land, sea and air transportation" section.

In 1914, Barrié was appointed gentleman of His Majesty.

== Other endeavours ==
Barrié was a person of multiple activities, being the president of the Villabona Paper Mill and an advisor of both the Tram Company and of the Electra Irún-Endar. He was also the CEO of Transatlántica Española, and he belonged to the Board of the Chamber of Commerce, Industry and Navigation, to the Works Board of the Port of Pasajes; consignee of ships and warehouseman of coal in Pasajes. Where he worked most intensely, however, was in the coal mines, being manager, delegate, and vice president of the Coto de Aller mines, in Asturias, and manager of the Orbó mines, in Palencia.

In all these companies, Barrié carried out extraordinary social work, to the point of having the support of the miners even during the Asturian Revolution.

== Personal life and death ==
Barrié married Eugenia Petit de Merville in Ciboure, with whom he had seven children, several of them good tennis players who would participate in the National Championship. On 27 May 1936, Barrié attended the marriage of one of his daughters, Josefina Satrústegui Petit de Merville, but just two months later, at the end of July, he was arrested and tried by the Popular Court of San Sebastián on 5 and 6 August, and was then sentenced to death and shot on that same day in the following month, at the age of 62.

The terrible death of the then-leader of Renovación Española in Guipúzcoa caused deep shock in Gipuzkoa and Asturias. His body appeared next to the Polloe cement cemetery.

== Legacy ==
On 26 September 2009, the representatives of the Federation were received by the mayor of San Sebastián as part of the centenary events, in which a tribute was paid to Jorge de Satrústegui Barrié.
