= John Beaty-Pownall =

English footballer

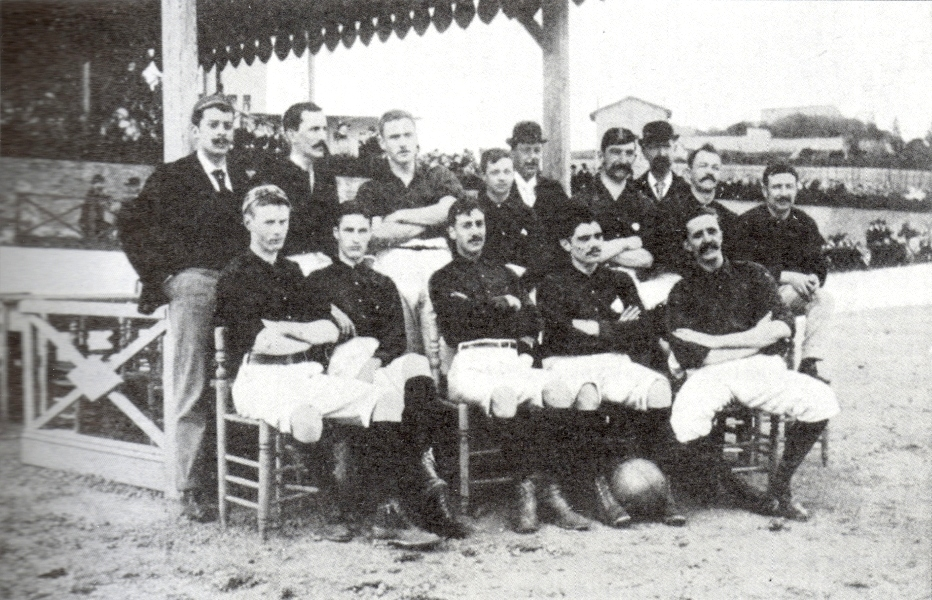
- Beaty-Pownall (standing, third from the left) in 1895

Personal information
- Full name: John Trent Beaty-Pownall
- Date of birth: 30 July 1874
- Place of birth: Alicante, Valencian Community, Spain
- Date of death: 1 February 1961 (aged 86)
- Place of death: Winchester, Hampshire, England
- Position: Forward

Senior career*
Years	Team	Apps	(Gls)
1892–1894	Barcelona Football Club	+3	(+1)
1894–1896	Sociedad de Foot-Ball de Barcelona	+3	(3)
- * Club domestic league appearances and goals

John Trent Beaty-Pownall (30 July 1874 – 1 February 1961) was an English football pioneer who played as a forward for some of the earliest Catalan clubs in existence such as Barcelona Football Club and Sociedad de Foot-Ball de Barcelona, where he also stood out as a great striker, netting some of the first goals in the history of Catalan football.

== Early life ==
Beaty-Pownall was born in Alicante on 30 July 1874, as the son of Charles Ernest Beaty Pownall (1838–1906), born in Bedfordshire, England. His older brother, Charles, was an officer of the Royal Navy.

== Sporting career ==
=== Barcelona Cricket Club ===
At some point in the early 1890s, the teenager Beaty-Pownall arrived in Barcelona, probably due to work reasons, like so many other Britons who moved to the Catalan capital. While there, he became a member of the British Club de Barcelona, where he practiced several modalities such as cricket with the Barcelona Cricket Club.

=== Barcelona Football Club ===
In 1892, Pownall met James Reeves, who was recruiting football enthusiasts to create a well-organized football club, and he joined him, having been impressed by his passionate and entrepreneurial spirit. Together with Reeves and some other pioneers in the city, such as Henry W. Brown, Henry Wood, the Morris brothers (Samuel, Enrique, and Miguel) and George Cockram, they formed the Barcelona Football Club in late 1892.

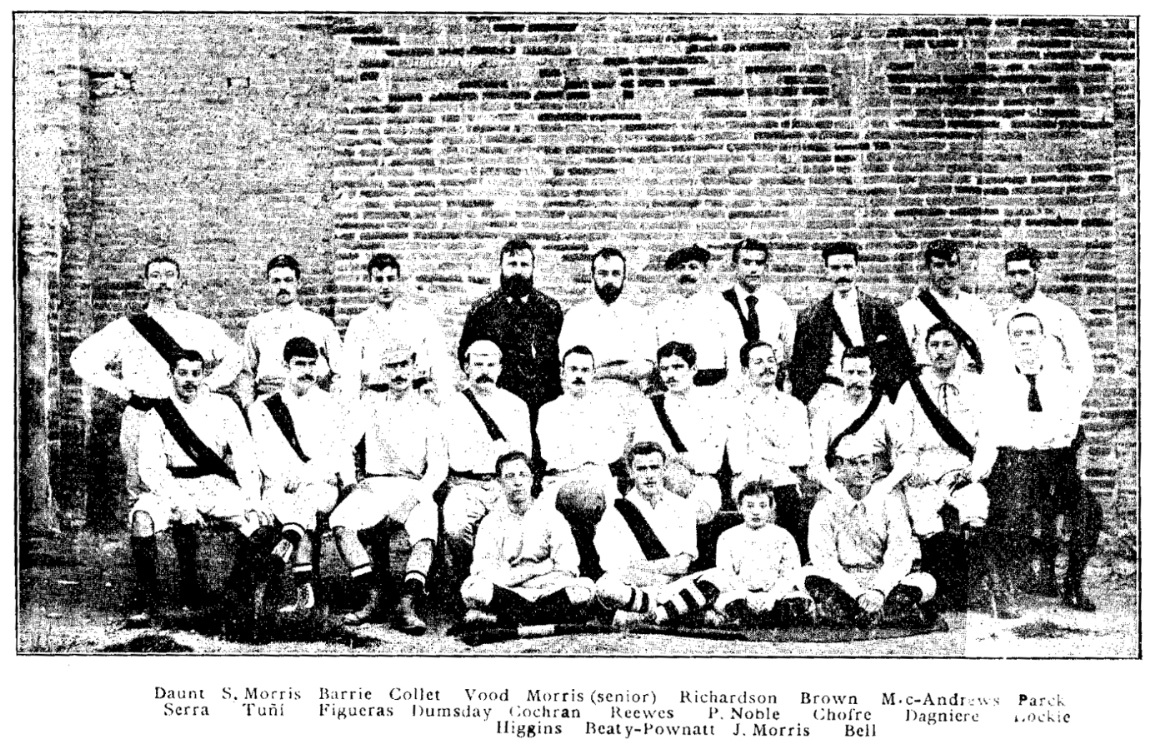
Beaty-Pownall appears in the oldest image of a football team in Spain. He can be seen seated on the ground, the second from the left

This entity organized the first known football match in the city, which was held at Hippodrome of Can Tunis on 25 December 1892. It remains unclear if he played in this match. However, he did play on 12 March 1893, in the historic match between a blue and a red team, starting as a forward for the latter in a 1–2 loss. Beaty-Pownall appears in what is regarded to be the oldest photograph of a football team in Spain, which depicts these two sides before the match at Can Tunis. He was four months shy of his 19th birthday and he can be seen seated, the second from the left, alongside fellow youngsters such as Higgins, Bell, and a 13-year-old boy Miguel Morris.

=== Sociedad de Foot-Ball de Barcelona ===
In late 1894, the club changed its name to the Sociedad de Foot-Ball de Barcelona and on 27 January 1895, Pownall was one of 16 footballers who featured in the first football match played in Bonanova, captaining the Reds in a 1–4 loss to the Blues led by Reeves. In the following week, on 2 February 1895, the same scenario took place, but this time he led by example with a goal to help his side to a 4–1 victory. He also played both games against Asociación de Foot-Ball de Torelló on 24 March and 14 April 1895, which was the very first time that teams from two different cities played against each other in Catalonia, and he rose to the occasion, netting once at Bonanova in an 8–3 local win and a brace at Torelló in a 3–5 loss.

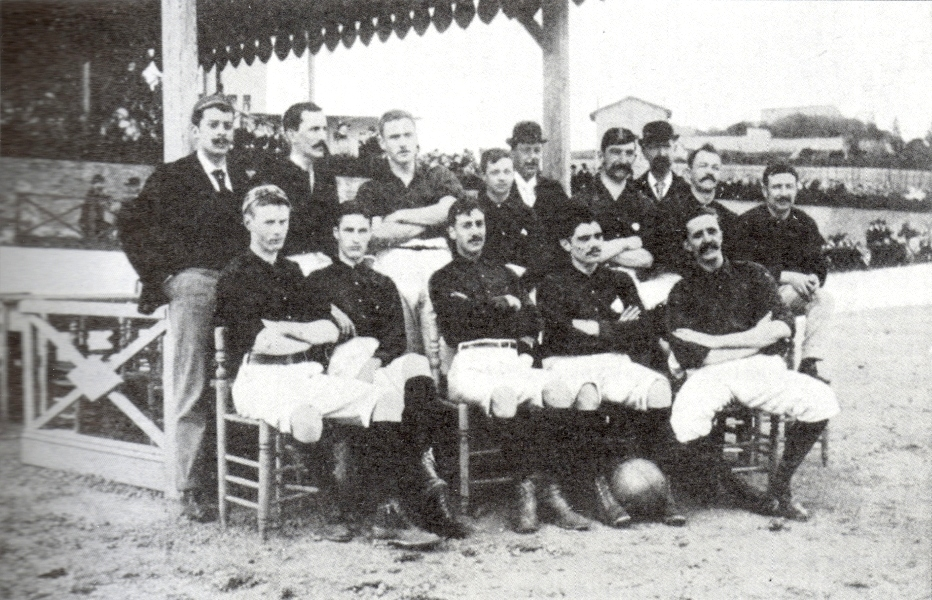
John Beaty-Pownall standing, third from the left, next to other pioneers of Catalan football such as James Reeves, the Parsons brothers and Alberto Serra.

Beaty-Pownall played several friendly matches at Can Tunis and a few others at Bonanova between 1892 and 1895, where he stood out as a great goal scorer, however, due to the little statistical rigor that the newspapers had at that time, the exact number of goals he netted is unknown. Despite some encouraging first steps, this Society was never officially established and when its founder and captain James Reeves returned to the United Kingdom in the autumn of 1895, the club began to decline and disappeared around 1896.

== Later life ==
His sister, Katherine Margaret Beaty-Pownall (1869–1942), married Henry Wood, who was one of his teammates at Barcelona Football Club, and after his death in 1907, she married another one of his teammates, this time James Revees, with whom she had an only child in 1910, John Pownall Reeves.

Beaty-Pownall died in Winchester on 1 February 1961, at the age of 86.
