= Henry W. Brown =

English footballer

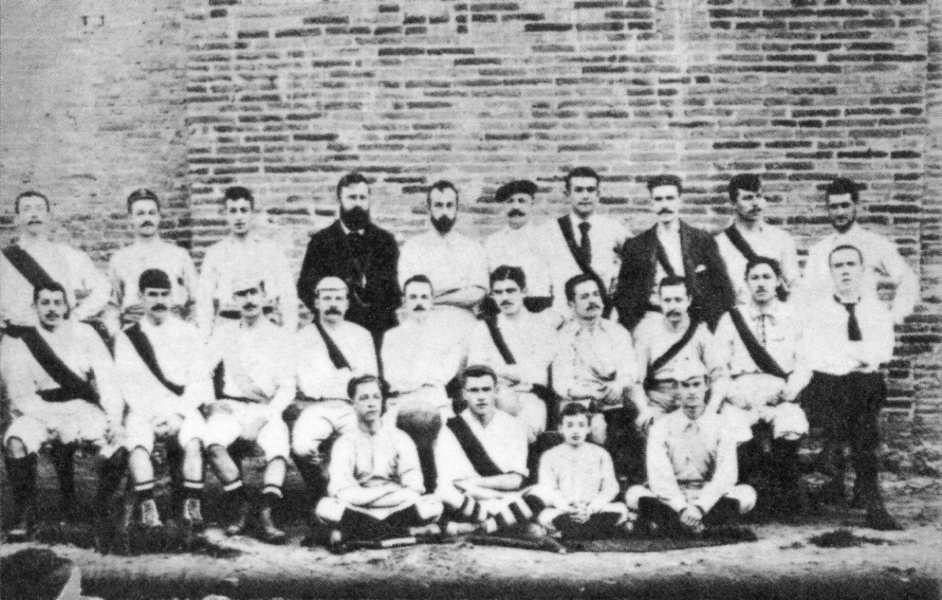
- Brown (standing in the third row, the third from the right) in 1893.

Personal information
- Full name: Henry W. Brown Martín
- Date of birth: Unknown
- Place of birth: England
- Date of death: Unknown
- Positions: Goalkeeper; defender

Senior career*
Years	Team	Apps	(Gls)
1892–1894	Barcelona Football Club		
1894–1896	Sociedad de Foot-Ball de Barcelona		
1899–1900	FC Barcelona	2	(0)
1899–1900	→ Team Anglès (loan)	2	(0)
- * Club domestic league appearances and goals

Henry W. Brown Martín was an English footballer who played as a goalkeeper and defender for Spanish club FC Barcelona at the turn of the century. He was a member of some of the earliest Catalan clubs in existence such as Barcelona Football Club and Sociedad de Foot-Ball de Barcelona. Together with the Parsons brothers, he was one of the few players who was part of both the Barcelona Society of 1894–96 and FC Barcelona.

== Playing career ==
=== Barcelona Football Club ===
Born in England in the early 1870s, Brown moved to Barcelona in the early 1890s for unclear reasons, but like with so many other Britons who moved to the Catalan capital at that time, it was probably due to work reasons. In 1892, he met James Reeves, who was recruiting football enthusiasts to create a well-organized football club, and Brown joined him, after being impressed by his passionate and entrepreneurial spirit. Together with Reeves and some other football pioneers in the city, such as George Cockram and the Morris (Samuel Sr. and Samuel), they formed the Barcelona Football Club in late 1892.

This entity organized the first known football match in the city, which took place on the Christmas Day of 1892 at the Hippodrome of Can Tunis. It remains unclear if he played in this match. However, he did play on 12 March 1893, in the historic match between a blue and a red team, starting as a defender for the latter in a 1–2 loss. Brown appears in what is regarded to be the oldest photograph of a football team in Spain, which depicts these two sides before the match at Can Tunis. He can be seen standing with a black jacket between Richardson and William MacAndrews.

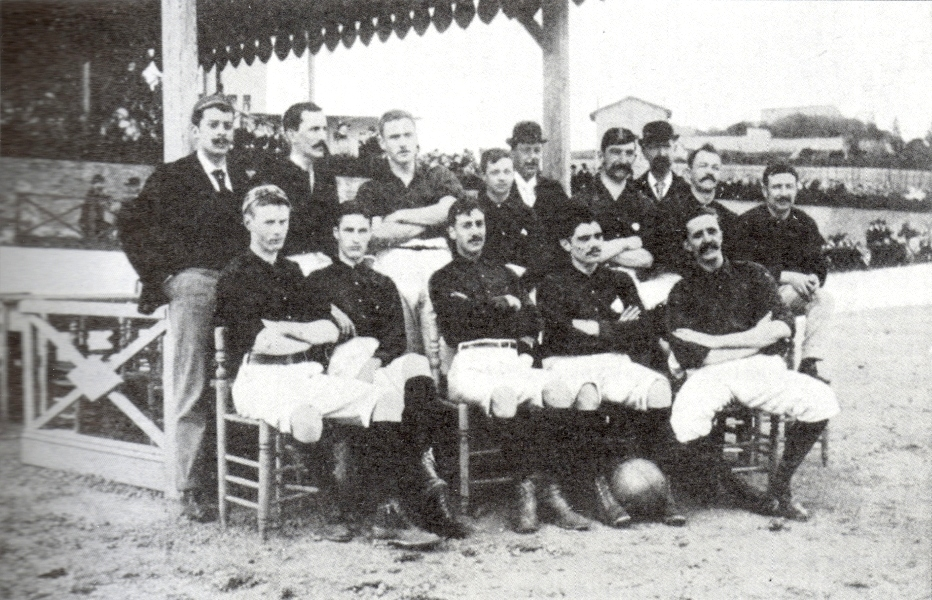
Members of the Barcelona Football Society on 24 March 1895. Brown can be seen standing, the second from the left, between Alberto Serra and John Beaty-Pownall.

In late 1894, a conflict between the club's members caused the entity to split into two groups, which led to its change of name to Sociedad de Foot-Ball de Barcelona, with whom Brown played several training matches (Blue vs Reds) at Bonanova, including on 2 February 1895, in which he played as a midfielder for the Reds led by John Beaty-Pownall in an eventual 4–1 victory over the Blues captained by Reeves.

Brown then played as a defender in two matches against a team from Torelló, which marked the first time that teams from two different cities played against each other in Catalonia. The first game took place on 24 March 1895, and ended in an 8–3 local victory. The result was attributed to the fact that Torelló's five forwards (or runners as the local press of the time called them) had trouble getting through Barcelona's strong and robust defenders: Brown and Wilson, who "every time they kicked the ball with one of those blows that raised it 30 or 40 meters away, a wave of enthusiastic applause and cheers arose". In total, Brown played several training matches (Blues vs Reds) at Can Tunis and a few others at Bonanova between 1892 and 1896, but due to the little statistical rigor that the newspapers had at that time, the exact number of matches and goals (if any) that he made is unknown.

Following the departure of James Reeves, the club's captain and leader, the Barcelona Football Society declined and disappeared around 1896. The city then went through a period of lack of interest in football, and for this reason, no Briton played football in Spain (that we know of) in 1897 and 1898. Together with the Parsons brothers (John and William), Brown played an important role in the return of football to the city, contributing in the emergence of Team Anglès, a team made up of members of the British colony living in Barcelona. However, Brown did not play in its official debut against FC Barcelona on 8 December 1899, which ended in a 1–0 win for the Britons.

=== FC Barcelona ===
Five days later, on 13 December 1899, the Blaugrana team merges with the Team Anglès. Brown thus joined the ranks of Barcelona, debuting on the Christmas Eve of 1899 against Català FC (3–1), which was only Barça's second-ever game, where he apparently played as a goalkeeper in the absence of Juan de Urruela. On 26 December 1899, Barcelona and Català agreed to join the best players of each team to face Team Anglès, and with the return of Urruela and the inclusion of Català's Fermín Lomba in the defensive line, Brown was left out and instead he played for the English in a 1–2 loss.

This exact same scenario was repeated on 6 January 1900, playing with Team Anglès for a second and last time, featuring in defense together with Jim Dykes and goalkeeper John Hamilton, two Scottish players from the predecessor of Escocès FC who were called up to cover the losses of Team Anglès. Together they formed a strong defensive partnership, keeping a clean-sheet in a 3–0 win. On 28 January, Brown played his second and last match for Barça, a 6–0 win over Català.

== Later life ==
In February 1900, both he and William Parsons left for Manila. In the following year, Brown made a brief return to Catalan football when he served as a linesman under referee William Mauchan in a match between Hispania AC and Tarragona at the 1900–01 Copa Macaya, which ended in a 5–0 win to the former.

The date of his death is unknown.
