= Jaime Morris =

English businessman and engineer

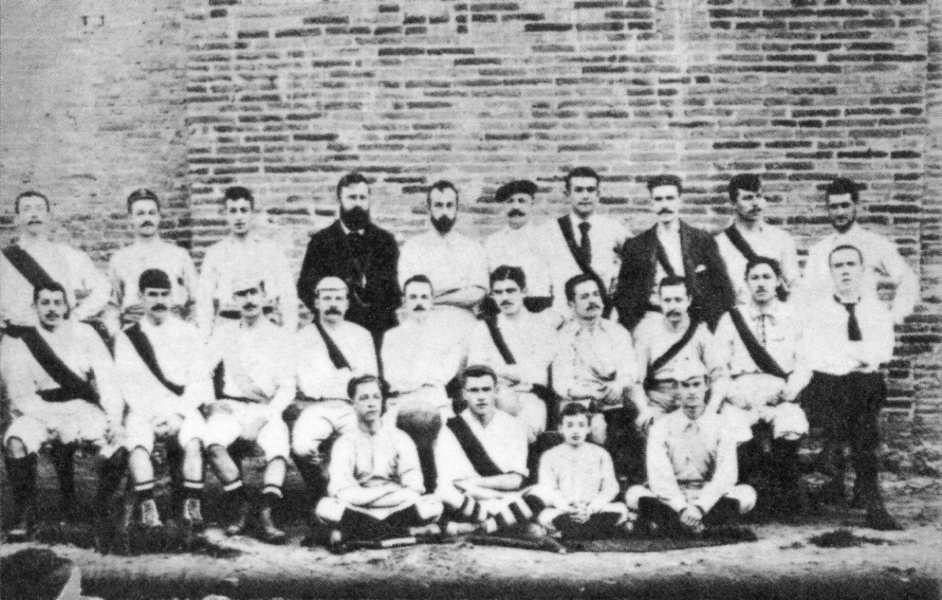
- Samuel Morris (standing, the fifth to right, wearing a beret) in 1893
- Born: Samuel James Morris Campbell; 3 February 1842; Holborn, London, England
- Died: 12 December 1909 (aged 67); Bassein Park Road, London, England
- Citizenship: English
- Occupations: engineer; businessman
- Known for: Father of Samuel, Enrique and Miguel
Association football career
- Position: Goalkeeper
Senior career*
Years	Team	Apps	(Gls)
1892–1894	Barcelona Football Club	+1	(0)
- * Club domestic league appearances and goals

Samuel James Morris Campbell (3 February 1842 – 12 December 1909), commonly known as Jaime Morris, was an English businessman and engineer. He is best known for being one of the first pioneers of football in Catalonia, playing as a goalkeeper for some of the earliest Catalan clubs in existence, such as Barcelona Football Club, in the early 1890s, at the age of 50.

As a young man, his adventurous and entrepreneurial spirit led him to settle in the Philippines in 1868, where he contracted the first two of a total of five marriages. Due to work reasons, he moved to Barcelona in 1889 to run two tram companies, becoming one of the most important figures in the Catalan capital. He was also noted for his prominent role in promoting football in the city, bringing a football ball from London to teach the sport to three of his sons, Samuel, Enrique and Miguel, thus starting one of the most important family dynasties in the amateur beginnings of football in Catalonia.

== Early and personal life ==
Morris was born on 3 February 1842 in the New North Street in Holborn, London, as the son of Samuel Morris (1814–1891) and Elizabeth Campbell (1813–1884).

In 1861, at the age of 19, Morris was sentenced to 6 months of hard labor for theft, and later that same year, he went to the Far East and participated in the defense of Shanghai and Kahding during the Taiping Rebellion (1850–1864). He then traveled through Japan and lived for 4 years in northern China (1863–67), until settling in the Philippines in 1868, which at the time was a colony of Spain.

While there, he married twice, first in 1868 in Manila, with María del Socorro de Olea y Marabea, a 16-year-old girl of Basque origin, with whom he had six children: Samuel (1870–1935), Augusto José (1871–1896), María del Carmen (1873–1965), Enrique Ramón (1874–?), Francisco Alberto (1875–1878), and Adela Cora (1877–?). His first wife died shortly after giving birth to Adela, so Morris married two years later with another young woman of Basque origin, Victorina Juliana Yrisarry Errasquin, with whom he had two more children: Victorina (1879–1935) and Miguel (1880–?). Augusto José was killed by Filipino rebels in San Mateo on 23 October 1896, while Francisco Alberto died at the age of three in 1878.

Morris would be widowed and remarried three more times (once in Barcelona, twice in England), and this time they were all British, having three new children with his last wife (Florence Foster), Lilian Florence (1901–?), James Hope (1904–?), and Heather Grace (1906–?) for a total of eleven children in five marriages in a hectic professional and personal life.

== Professional career ==
Morris returned to the United Kingdom in 1886, bringing his family with him, but in 1889, they moved to Barcelona when he was assigned (or transferred) to run two tram companies: Barcelona Tramways Company Limited (Tramways Co Ltd) and Sociedad del Tranvía de Barcelona, Ensanche y Gracia, two companies of the same company, but with their own autonomy. He was responsible for the electrification of trams in 1889 (to date animal traction), a measure that was initially very controversial with many Barcelona residents considering it "diabolical" and potentially deadly while the press did not spare cruel criticism either, going as far as accusing him of collusion with the municipal government.

Jaime Morris, as he was known in Catalonia, modernized the lines and was the one who launched electric traction for the first time in Barcelona. This fact and the competition with other companies made him enmity with part of the Barcelona society of the time before finally leaving his position in 1899.

== Sporting career ==
=== First steps ===
According to his son Miguel, Morris played football in England and before leaving London, he brought a football ball with him, and on every Sunday morning, he would teach his three sons, Samuel, Enrique (Henry), and Miguel (Júnior), the practice of football, a sport that was practically unknown in the city at the time, taking them to a suitable place where he let them run around while he kicked the ball. When he got tired, he would take away their coats and jackets, and with them and his clothes, he made two piles that marked the limits of the goal, hence becoming goalkeeper, so he could teach his sons how to shoot. However, he had some trouble because people, seeing him in shirt sleeves and knee-length shorts, took him as crazy and immoral because they thought he was in his underwear. One day, Morris had a ball in his hand on the tram and was forced to deflate it to "prove" that it was not an explosive device.

As a result of this, Morris began taking his sons to the outskirts of the city, preferably in Can Tunis (Casa Antúnez), in some fields adjacent to the Hippodrome of Can Tunis (then known as the hippodrome of Marina de Sants), due to being a lonely place free of onlookers and rowdies.

=== Barcelona Cricket Club ===
In the late 1880s, Morris became a member of the British Club de Barcelona located on La Rambla dels Capuchins. There, he practiced several modalities, and in 1891, together with his oldest son, Henry Wood, and William MacAndrews, he was a founder of Barcelona Cricket Club (domiciled at Ronda de Sant Pere), one of the many branches of the British Club. They played their first cricket matches in a field near the Hippodrome of Can Tunis, which were disputed between the club's members and on some occasions against British sailors who docked in the port of Barcelona, with the earliest example of this dating back to 28 August 1891.

Together with his son Samuel, he was one of the first pioneers of football in Catalonia, being part of the first known club to have played football in the city, the Barcelona Cricket Club, since they played cricket in the summer and then football in the winter (which was common at the time).

=== Barcelona Football Club ===
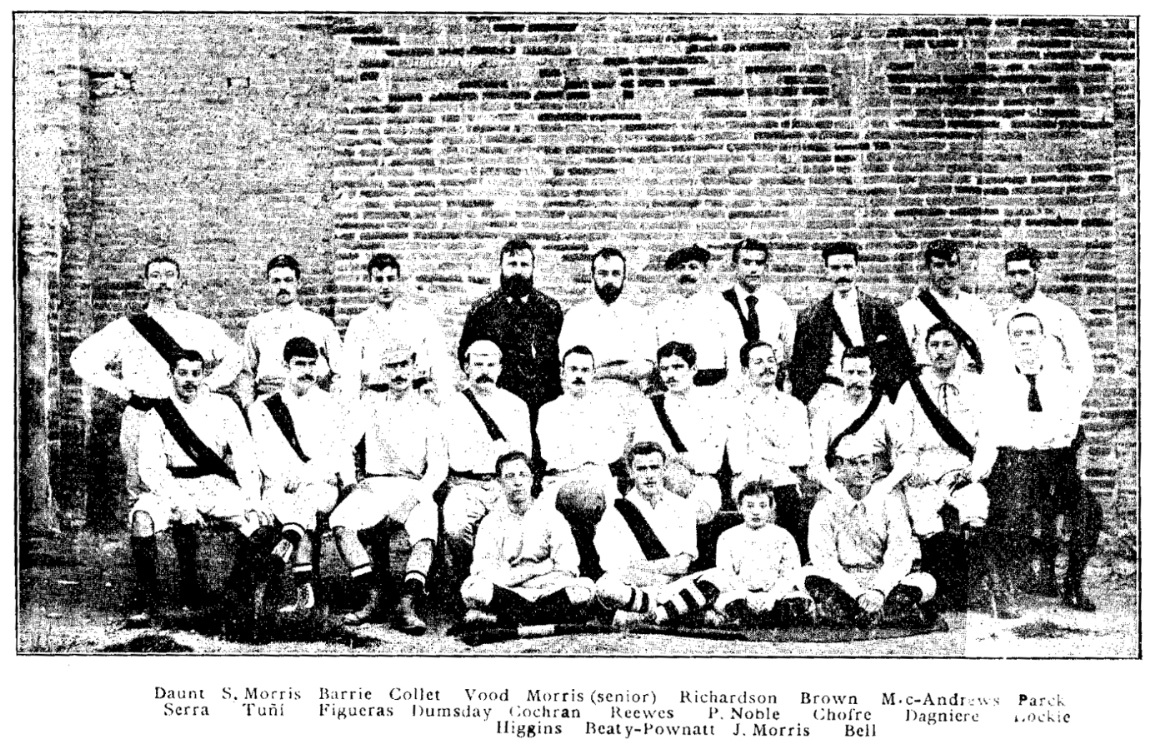
Jaime appears in the oldest documented image of a football team in Spain. He can be seen in the third row with a beret, between fellow goalkeeper Wood and Richardson, both of whom had been from the Cricket Club.

In 1892, the Morris met James Reeves, who approached the cricket club's members to propose to them the idea of creating a well-organized football club, and the Morris were among the first to join him, as they were also in love with the game. The Morris were crucial in helping Reeves find enough people to assemble two teams, which included French, English, and Spanish, thus playing a vital role in the formation of the Barcelona Football Club in late 1892, and together with Reeves, they were crucial in its success.

This entity held the first known football match in the city, which was held on the fields near the Hippodrome of Can Tunis on 25 December 1892, in Casa Antúnez. It remains unclear if they actually played in this match or not, but they surely played on 12 March 1893, in the historic match between a blue team and a red team, and interestingly, father and son were on opposite teams, with Samuel playing for the Blues as a midfielder while Jaime represented the reds as a goalkeeper at the age of 51, but despite his advanced age, he managed to keep his son at bay in a 1–2 loss, with both of the goals that he conceded coming from non-Britons, Figueras and Jorge Barrié. Together with his youngest son, Miguel, the three of them appeared in what is regarded to be the oldest photograph of a football team in Spain, which depicts these two sides before the match on 12 March.

His son Samuel went on to follow in his footsteps by becoming the club's goalkeeper, a position he held until the end of his career. All three of his sons went on to play for FC Barcelona, thus becoming the first-ever Filipinos to play for Hispania AC and FC Barcelona, ahead of the likes of Manuel Amechazurra and Paulino Alcántara. According to his son Miguel, he was one of the mainstays of Hispania in 1900.

In an interview that his youngest son Miguel gave on 7 December 1948, he stated that "fills me with satisfaction, is to see how from those careers my father pursued after the ball at Casa Antúnez has led to what football is and means today in Barcelona and Spain".

== Later life ==
His fourth wife, with whom he married in London in 1896, was Helen Catherine Gillespie (1856–1928), who was born in London, but was remembered in the family as "a Scottish woman", and she is most likely a relative to James Gillespie, who four years later, in 1900, became in the first Scottish footballer to play for FC Barcelona, albeit only in three friendly matches.

Morris was a Freemason and this most likely led him to a close friendship with other key families in the birth of FC Barcelona such as the Gaisserts (Émile Gaissert, uncle of Joan Gamper and father of Emilio Gaissert) or the Saint Nobles (George Saint Noble, known as "brother electricity", and the footballers George and Royston Saint Noble, relatives of the Maragalls).

In 1905, Morris appeared at the auction for the concession of the construction of the Gran Vía in Madrid, as a representative of the company Hughes & Sterling of Liverpool and London, associated with the Sociedad Miró Trepat y Cia of Barcelona, a Catalan family closely linked to Spanish football, especially through José María Miró, a president of Español and Sevilla FC).

== Death ==
Morris died in London on 12 December 1909, at the age of 64.
