= William MacAndrews =

Scottish footballer

William McAndrews
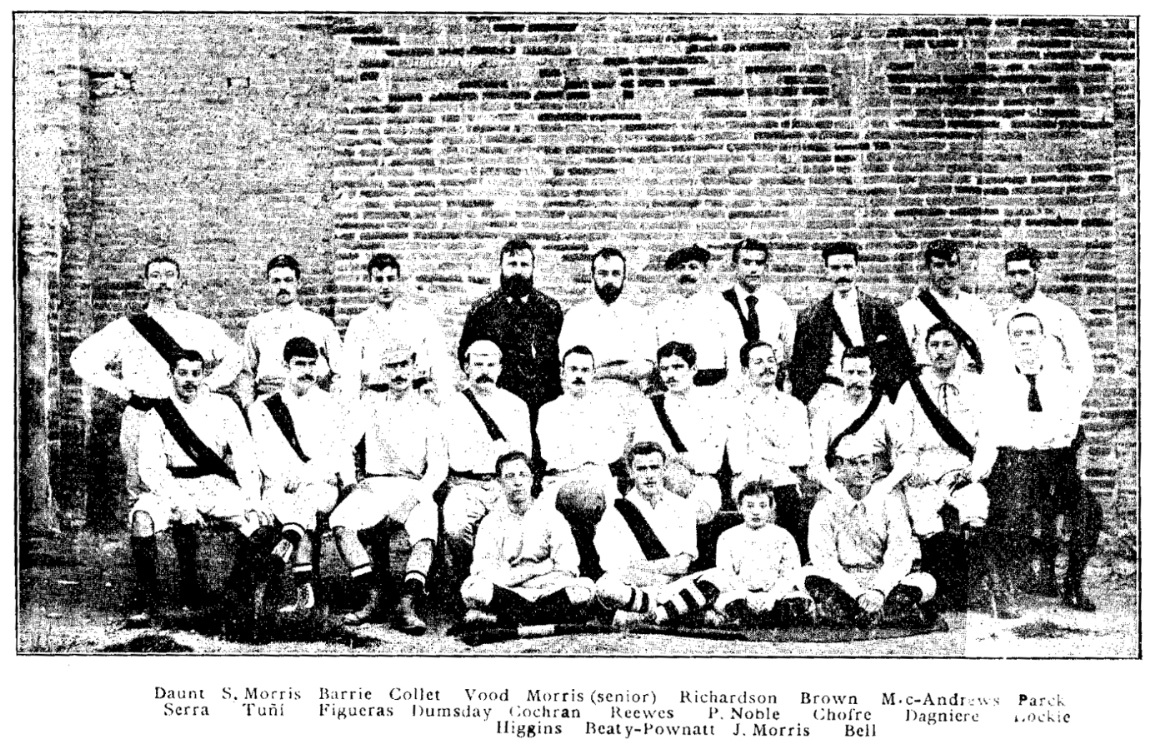
- McAndrews (standing, second from the right) in 1893

Personal information
- Full name: William McAndrews
- Date of birth: 1872
- Place of birth: Scotland
- Date of death: 1944 (aged 71-72)
- Place of death: Unknown
- Position: Midfielder

Senior career*
Years	Team	Apps	(Gls)
1892–1894	Barcelona Football Club	+3	(+1)
1895	Torelló Foot-ball Association	2	
- * Club domestic league appearances and goals

William McAndrews (1872 – 1944), sometimes misspelled as William MacAndrews, was a Scottish football pioneer who played as a midfielder for some of the earliest Catalan clubs in existence such as Barcelona Cricket Club and Barcelona Football Club.

== Playing career ==
Born in Scotland, McAndrews moved to Barcelona in the late 1880s due to work reasons, and like so many other Britons who moved to the Catalan capital, he soon joined the British Club of Barcelona on La Rambla dels Capuchins, where he practiced several sports. In 1891, together with Henry Wood, and the Morris (Jaime and Samuel, he was a founder of the Barcelona Cricket Club, one of the many branches of the British Club. They played their first cricket matches in a field near the Hippodrome of Can Tunis, which were disputed between the club's members and on some occasions against British sailors who docked in the port of Barcelona, with the earliest example of this dating back to 28 August 1891.

In 1892, he met James Reeves, who approached the cricket club's members to propose to them the idea of creating a well-organized football club. At first, Wood, the captain of the cricket club, was reluctant to do so, but McAndrews convinced him otherwise, having been impressed by the passionate and entrepreneurial spirit of Reeves. Together with Reeves and some other football pioneers in the city, they formed the Barcelona Football Club in late 1892, and Cochran was crucial in its success. The only other known Scottish in the club was George Cochran, although the nature of their relationship remains unknown.

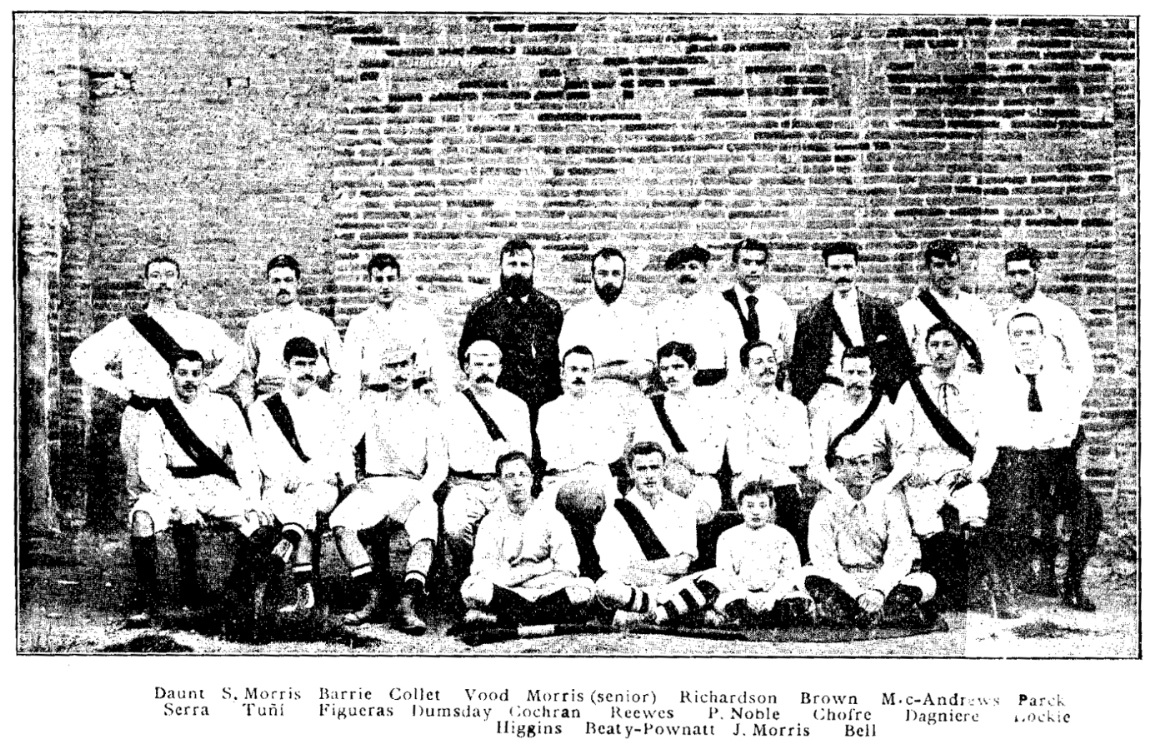
McAndrews appears in the oldest documented image of a football team in Spain. He can be seen standing in the third row, the second from the right, between Henry W. Brown and Park.

This entity organized the first known football match in the city, which was held at Hippodrome of Can Tunis on 25 December 1892. It remains unclear if he played in this match. However, he did play on 12 March 1893, in the historic match between a blue and a red team, starting as a defender for the former in a 1–2 win. McAndrews appears in what is regarded to be the oldest photograph of a football team in Spain, which depicts these two sides before the match at Can Tunis.

In late 1894, a conflict between the club's members caused the entity to split into two groups, one headed by Reeves and the other by Cochran, Wood, and MacAndrews. Cochran's group decided to move and settle in the neighboring town of Sant Vicenç de Torelló in Osona. McAndrews played several training matches (Blues vs Reds) at Can Tunis and a few others at Bonanova between 1892 and 1895, the last of which with Torelló Foot-ball Association, however, due to the little statistical rigor that the newspapers had at that time, the exact number of matches and goals (if any) he performed is unknown. In 1895, he played as a defender for Torelló in two matches against Sociedad de Foot-Ball de Barcelona, which marked the first time that teams from two different cities played against each other in Catalonia.

== Later life ==
McAndrews married Alice Mary McAndrews (1876–1955), who was born in Greater London. The couple had three children, William Edwin Roderick Goldthorp in 1901, Esther Alice McAndrews in 1905, and Grace Lillian McAndrews in 1910.

McAndrews died in 1944, at the age of either 71 or 72.
