= English Colony of Barcelona Football Team =

Football club in Spain active between 1892 and 1900

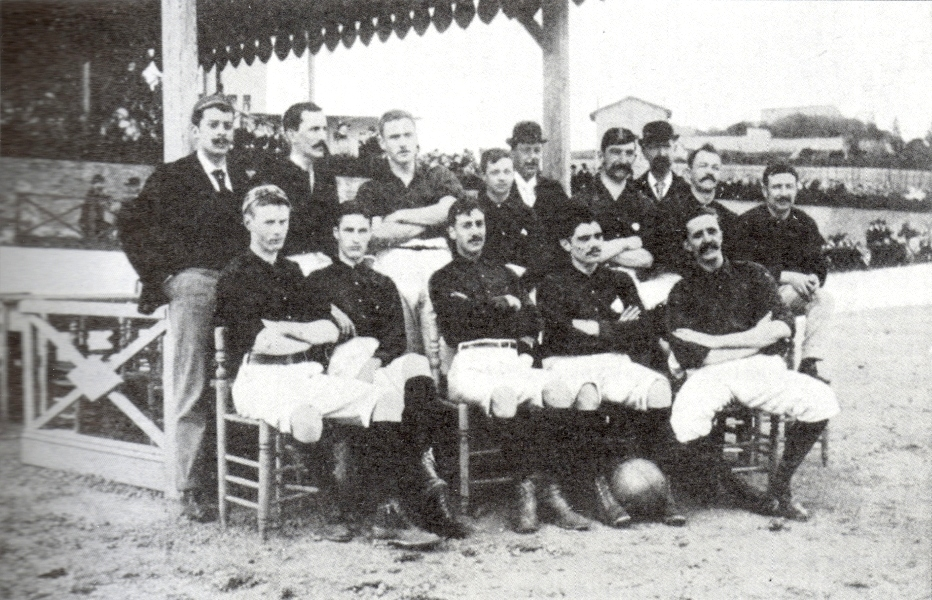
- Nicknames: Team Anglès; English Colony Team
- Founded: December 1892; 129 years ago.
- Dissolved: Mid-1900
- Ground: Hippodrome of Can Tunis; Velódromo de la Bonanova
| Home colours | Away colours |

The Sociedad de Foot-Ball de Barcelona (Spanish: Barcelona Football Society) was a football scratch team that existed between 1892 and 1896, mainly consisting of players from the British community within Barcelona, but also included Catalans and Frenchmen. This entity was initially known as the Barcelona Football Club (1892–94), before being renamed as Sociedad de Foot-Ball de Barcelona following a restructuring in 1894. It was one of the first Catalan football clubs and is considered a predecessor of FC Barcelona founded in 1899. Some historians ascribe this entity as "a group of thirty friends, English workers, who played alternately and without a regular squad".

This entity is best remembered for its pioneering role in the amateur beginnings of football in Catalonia, organizing the first known football match in Catalonia in 1892 and being the catalyst for many other historic landmarks such as the oldest photograph of a football team in Spain and the first proper chronicle of a football match in Spain, both regarding a game between the club's members held on 12 March 1893. Moreover, they were part of the first known rivalry in Spanish football, when they faced the Scottish colony of Sant Martí a few times during the winter of 1893–94. Their game against a team from Torelló in 1895 marked the first time that teams from two different cities played against each other in Catalonia.

In 1895, the presidency of this club was given to the British consul William Wyndham. Apart from Wyndham as president, little is known about its board of directors, only that James Reeves, English, and George Cochran, Scottish, were its captain and vice-captain respectively between 1892 and 1894, always acting as captains on the two sides into which the members of the club were divided every Sunday. Reeves was the undisputed leader and fundamental head behind the club's foundation and management, and likewise, upon his departure in the autumn of 1895, this society, which was never officially established, soon declined and seems to disappear around 1896.

Between 1892 and 1895, this group of football pioneers would meet up in a field near the Hippodrome of Can Tunis in the municipality of Sants, and from 1895 onwards, the club's meetings were held at the Velódromo de la Bonanova in Barcelona, because it was closer to the city center, thus practicing the sport before the attentive and curious gaze of the local population.

== History ==
=== Origins ===
At the end of the 19th century, Catalonia enjoyed the most developed industry in Spain, especially thanks to its cotton industry, and for this reason, Barcelona became the home to a vast British colony. (Note: According to the 1877 Census, there were 370 British living in Barcelona.) Football first entered Catalonia thanks to the British colony that worked and lived there (and later through the Catalans returning from studying abroad), among whom the figures of Samuel James Morris and James Reeves stand out. The former was an English businessman and engineer who moved to Barcelona in 1889–90 to run two tram companies. He brought a football ball from London with him, and on Sunday mornings, he would teach his three sons, Samuel, Enrique (Henry) and Miguel (Júnior), the practice of football, a sport practically unknown in the city at the time, thus taking them to the outskirts of the city, preferably in Can Tunis (Casa Antúnez), in some fields adjacent to the Hippodrome of Can Tunis (then known as the hippodrome of Marina de Sants), due to being a lonely place free of onlookers and rowdies.

Known in Catalonia as Jaime Morris, he and his oldest son Samuel were members of the British Club de Barcelona, located on La Rambla dels Capuchins, no. 26, and in 1891, the Morris, together with Henry Wood and William MacAndrews, among other Britons, founded the Barcelona Cricket Club, domiciled at Ronda de Sant Pere, which was the first club to play football in Catalonia, as they played cricket in the spring-summer and then football in the autumn-winter (which was common at the time). Under the umbrella of the British Club of La Rambla, the cricketers began meeting in Can Tunis in a field located between the hippodrome and the Civil Arsenal, not too far from where the Morris brothers had learned to play the game with their father. (Note: Their first cricket matches were disputed between the club's members and on some occasions against British sailors who docked in the port of Barcelona, with the earliest example of this dating back to 28 August 1891.)

The first football "match" of which I have news took place in the Hipódromo de Barcelona [Can Tunis], in 1892, between young people from the English colony, who belonged to a Society, domiciled in the round of San Pedro, called "Cricket Club Barcelona", and between some nationals. (Note: "Some nationals" is either a reference to the Catalans or the Barcelona residents, who were the members of the Regatta Club.)

— Agustin Peris de Vargas of El Figaró on 18 November 1919.

Reeves, on the other hand, arrived in Barcelona at some point in early 1892 due to work reasons. He was an enthusiastic and passionate lover of the game, but instead of joining the cricket team of the British Club of La Rambla, which was a strictly British entity, Reeves decided to create an organization exclusively dedicated to the practice of football and that would include British and Catalans alike. Reeves was a member of Club Regatas de Barcelona (a club of rowing and sailing established in 1881), and the spokesman for the club's British members (or British Club Regatas), so he used this position to meet and convince some of them to play football, but also some French members and most notably, three Catalans, Figueras, Tuñí, and Alberto Serra, who thus became the first documented Catalans to practice football in Catalonia. They began to play football around the autumn of 1892, the natural beginning of the football season, in the same ground that the Cricket Club was using to play football, and thus, they began facing each other, preferably on holidays, since Sundays were not a non-working day until 1905. Their first match thus probably took place on All Saints' Day on 1 November. The players, no matter the number (they rarely managed to be 22), were divided into two teams, one dressed in Blue (Azul) and their opponents in Red (Encarnado).

A few enthusiastic young English people organized football games every holiday day at the hippodrome of this city, counting on the valuable collaboration of other Spanish sportsmen, mostly members of the real local regatta clubs.

— Enrique Font Valencia of La Dinastía on 9 March 1893.

During their matches in the Spanish public holidays of 6 and 8 December, Reeves proposed to the cricketers the idea of creating a well-organized football club, and having impressed some of his countrymen with his passionate and entrepreneurial spirit, he convinced some of the Cricket Club members to join him, including some of its founders, such as Wood, MacAndrews, and the Morris, thus achieving a respectable number of partners in a short period of time, and together, along with the others he recruited, they founded a new club unaffiliated from the British Club of La Rambla. Apparently, this group of football pioneers led by Reeves was constituted as Barcelona Football Club, thus following the same structure of English club names, where the name of the town where it belongs, "Barcelona", precedes the purpose of the association, "Football Club", contrary to the associations made up by Catalans, Spanish or imitators of these where the purpose always precedes the town, as in the association set up in 1899 by the Swiss Joan Gamper together with a few Catalans: Futbol Club Barcelona.

=== Barcelona Football Club (1892–94) ===
A whole team from the Club de Regatas –then the most important athletic society among us– arrived by sea, in a canoe, to deal with the English, with whom they played for three months.

— Josep Elías.

Although the British colony of Barcelona had a large presence in the city, finding 22 individuals (plus the referee) was not an easy task, given that the expatriates came to work and many of them had positions of responsibility. It was not until the end of 1892 (the winter), after months of hard work, that Reeves managed to gather enough individuals to assemble two teams, although in the vast majority of matches, they did not complete the 11 per side. This group of football pioneers was made up of the British cricket players of the Barcelona Cricket Club, such as the Morris, Wood, Dumsday, Richardson, Beaty-Pownall and MacAndrews; the British, Catalan and French members of the Club Regatas de Barcelona, such as Ubaldo Noble and Lockie; Figueras, Tuñi and Serra; Chofre, Daunt and Georges Dagnière; and some other figures from unknown whereabouts such as Jorge Barrié, Henry W. Brown, Park, and George Cochran. Finally, on 25 December 1892, they were able to play the first known football match in the city (actually in the neighboring municipality of Sants, in the old La Marina de Sants), which was held in some field between the hippodrome and the civil arsenal. This was their first meeting documented in the press as the local newspaper La Dinastía reported on the Christmas Eve that "the partners from the Real Club de Regatas have organized a game of foot-ball, which they will play at eight in the morning on Sunday(25)". Josep Elías i Juncosa, who played for FC Barcelona between 1900 and 1903, recalled having witnessed matches at the Can Tunis Hippodrome between the English and the members of the Club de Regatas for three months.

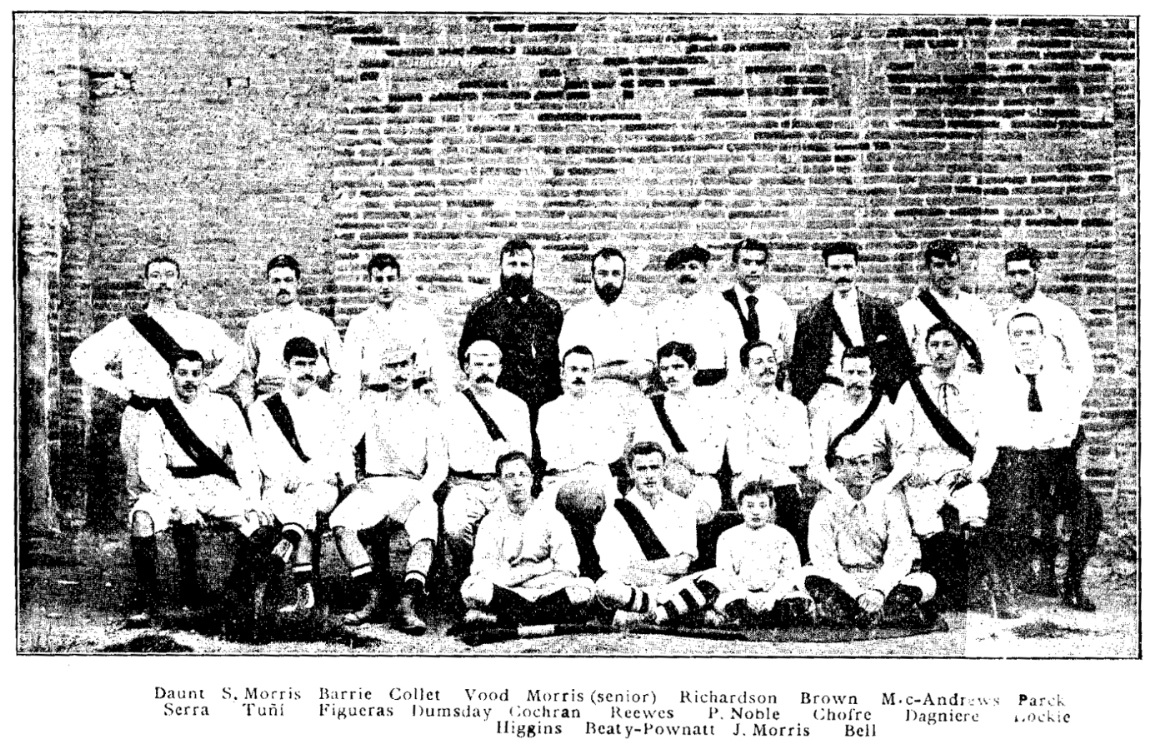
The two sides of the Barcelona Football Club. Taken on 12 March 1893, it is widely regarded as the oldest documented image of a football team in Spain.

Reeves kept organizing football matches and training sessions between the members of his club, with the last game of the season, which took place at the end of the winter on 12 March 1893, being a historic match in many ways. In addition to being the last game of the season, this match was the subject of the first proper chronicle of the dispute of a football match, which appeared in La Dinastía on 16 March, written by Enrique Font Valencia, who detailed the aspects of the game, including lineups, the color of the clothes, the name of the referee, the result and the goalscorers. According to the chronicle, the match took place at four in the afternoon, on the field near the hippodrome, and it was refereed by Alfredo Collett, the manager of the British water company. The blue team won 2–1 with goals from the locals, Figueras and Barrié, while the Red's one was netted by Mr. Reeves himself. Jaime Morris (senior), who played for the Reds as a goalkeeper, was 51 years old at the time, but despite his advanced age, he managed to keep his oldest son at bay, who played for the Blues as a midfielder, while his youngest son, Miguel, aged just 13, watched from the stands. Years later, in 1906, Joaquim Escardó of Los Deportes published a photogravure of the 22 footballers that played that match, plus the referee and Miguel Morris. The photograph is thus widely believed to be the oldest documented image of a football team in Spain. (Note: The caption names all the figures and even though Escardó did not date it exactly ("The two sides of the then-existing Barcelona Football Club formed around the years from 1892 to 1895…"), the players and referee in Escardó's photogravure match exactly with the line-ups of the chronicle by Valencia in 1893, which proves that this engraving corresponds to the match played on 12 March.) The 1906 article also stated that "The individual from the English colony Reewes was the soul of that Club".

At the beginning of 1893, the frequency of matches increased notably, with confrontations between red and blue teams becoming common, and they began to take football much more seriously. As a result of this, they decided to formally start a football club in Barcelona in the autumn of the following year.

After the summer of 1893, football returned to the Catalan capital, and the Barcelona club played its first games against neighboring towns as the news in the Barcelona press related several matches between the English Colony from Barcelona and the Scottish colony from Sant Martí (an independent municipality until 1897), with the press reporting at least three matches between them, played on 8 December 1893, 11 March, and 15 April 1894. Local historians claim that this was the first ever 'unofficial' rivalry in Spanish football. The Scottish colony's history began in 1893, when John Shields and Edward B. Steegmann rented the central warehouses of a factory in Sant Martí, to create a branch of Johnston, Shields & Co in Catalonia, which became known as La Escocesa. These Scottish workers would later create Escocès FC, and likewise, the English Colony went on to create Team Anglès, two teams who were pivotal in the history of Catalan football.

=== Sociedad de Foot-Ball de Barcelona (1894–96) ===
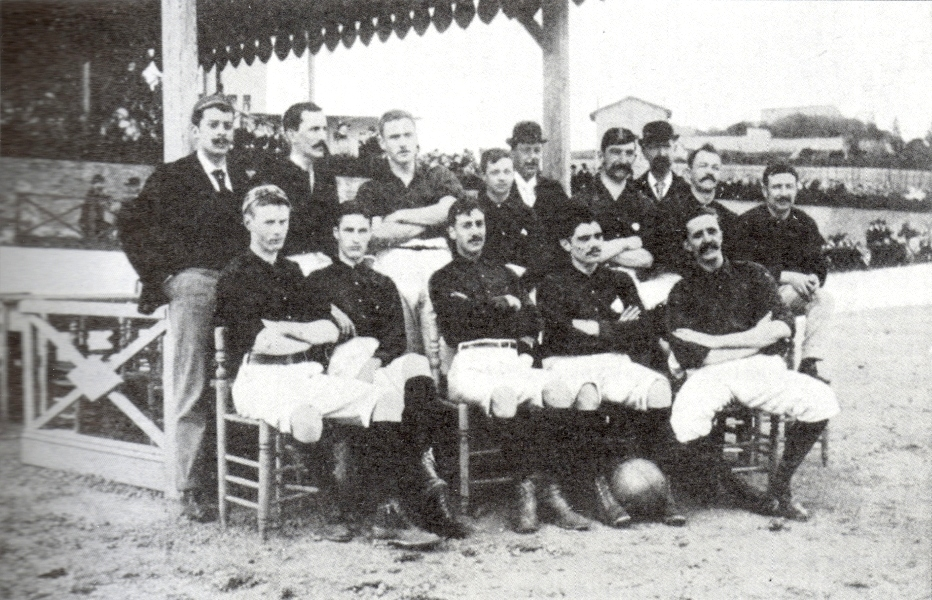
Members of the Barcelona Football Society on 24 March 1895. Standing, from left to right: Alberto Serra, Henry W. Brown, John Beaty-Pownall, Enrique Morris, Matt Wilson, Samuel Morris and Hallam. Seated: John and William Parsons, Sloon, James Reeves and Bruger.

Either at the end of 1894 or the beginning of 1895, and as suggested in the press, they formally started a football club in Barcelona by founding the Sociedad de Foot-Ball de Barcelona (Spanish translation of Foot-ball Club Barcelona). Between 1892 and 1894, Reeves and Cochran always acted as captains of the two sides into which the members of the club were divided every Sunday, but the last example of this took place on 8 December 1894. In his next and last match with the Barcelona club, Cochran appeared with the loss of the captaincy, which was given to the 20-year-old John Beaty-Pownall. This was most likely the result of a growing conflict between him and Reeves, probably about the formalization process that the club was going through. Their conflict spread to the rest of the club's members, which caused the entity to split into two groups, one led by Reeves and the other by Cochran, Wood, and MacAndrews. Both sides suffered from an immediate lack of players, so Reeves turned to Club Regatas again, recruiting Tordo, Soñé, and Codina, and then to the Barcelona Cricket Club, recruiting new British members such as Quiney, Fallon, Heather, and most notably, another pioneering pair of brothers, the Parsons, John and William. The Parsons would go on to co-found FC Barcelona in 1899 while Fallon went on to co-found Escocès FC in 1900. On the other hand, Cochran's group decided to move and settle in the neighboring town of Sant Vicenç de Torelló in Osona, where they introduced football to the Colonia Borgonyà from the Scottish spinning company J& P Coats Ltd, which resulted in the creation of the Torelló Foot-ball Association (which was erroneously translated as Asociación de Foot-ball de Torelló).

Together with the change of names, came also the change of fields, as the Barcelona club left the Hippodrome of Can Tunis, where they had been playing football, and moved to the Velódromo de la Bonanova, as they were looking for a place of easier access to the city center. The first football match played in Bonanova took place on 27 January 1895 and was played by 16 players from the Sociedad de Foot-Ball de Barcelona (SF de Barcelona) divided into two teams: one dressed in blue and the other one in red, with the former winning 4–1 with goals from William Parsons (3) and Enrique Morris, while the red's consolation was netted by Samuel Morris. From then on, Sunday football games became a regular event at Bonanova, although its vast majority were training matches (Blues vs Reds), such as the one held on 2 February 1895, in which the Reds, captained by the new vice-captain Beaty-Pownall, defeated 10-men Blues, captained by Reeves, in a game that saw both captains score once. Also in early February 1895, this group of football pioneers offered the honorary presidency of their society to the British consul William Wyndham, which he accepted; surely a detail that highlights that this entity was, at least, a serious and very well organized group, but despite that, there is no evidence of ever being legally established. The SF de Barcelona had its headquarters next to the Bonanova velodrome, being uniformed with a red shirt and white pants.

The activity of the SF de Barcelona continued with intensity and news gave reports of several training sessions to prepare for future matches against the Torelló team. Barcelona only played two non-training matches in the 1894–95 season, both against Torelló team, with Reeves and Cochran being the captain of their respective sides in both games. These were the very first football games between teams from two different cities (in Catalonia). The first match took place on 24 March 1895 and ended in an 8–3 local victory, and the result was attributed to the fact that Torelló played against both the sun and the wind and that their five forward (or runners as the local press of the time called them) had trouble getting through Barcelona's strong and robust defenders, Brown and Wilson. Barcelona's goals were netted by Reeves, John (2) and William Parsons, Enrique Morris, Barrié, Fallon and Beaty-Pownall, while Torelló's goals were scored by Cochran, Englis and Tong.

The second match took place on 14 April, after the Torelló Football Association, fulfilling a duty of courtesy, accepted the invitation of the Barcelona Football Society to play another match, this one at Torelló's field, a sloped and waterlogged ground. According to the chronicles of the time, they disputed said "challenge" as an act of revenge, and this time victory smiled at those from Torelló with a 5–3 win. Barcelona played with the same team except for three changes, replacing defenders Fallon and Wilson with Richardson and Quiney, and midfielder Barrié with Heather. On the other hand, Torelló played with only one change. Cochran netted a hat-trick in the first half to give a 3–0 lead to his side, but Barcelona fought back in the second half and managed to make it 3–3. However, Torelló scored twice in the dying minutes, thanks to an own goal and pressure on Barça's defender Quiney that forced him to drop the ball for an unidentified Torelló element to score. These meetings gave rise to the curious circumstance that a peseta was charged for the entrance and 2.10 with a seat in the grandstand. With a capacity of 3,000, Bonanova was seen completely full on both occasions with the public being interested in the affair as if it was well known to most of them, and after the games were over, the attendees left the venue enthusiastic and satisfied, and with some of the young spectators dedicating themselves to rehearsing some passes and hits with the ball, thus demonstrating the pleasure with which they had witnessed it.

In the spring of 1895, football in Barcelona was already played by several junior and senior teams, and the winning teams were awarded medals. There are already many Catalans in these teams: G. Busquets, J. Busquets, A. Serra, Puiggener, Arcola, Tordo, J. Suñé, Batlle, Soler, Farré, Montañés, Ramírez, Molera, Cerdá, Codina or Arancitia. But despite this strength, the club's many problems with the owners of the velodrome complicated the existence of the company, which had to look for another course.

=== Decline and collapse ===
Coinciding with the closure of the Barcelona Waterworks Company Ltd, James Reeves returned to the United Kingdom in November of 1895, leaving the club orphaned in its management. Following the departure of the "club's soul", it was the Catalans who took the reins of the team, but without him, the entity soon began to decline, and by early 1896 he was a shadow of himself. Given the difficulties encountered by the concession of the premises (pelouse) of the Bonanova Velodrome, they began to play between the vicinity of the velodrome and the streets and esplanades of San Gervasi, before moving back to the field near Casa Antúnez (Can Tunis). Around 1896 this society, which was never officially established, seems to disappear as news about the SF de Barcelona become non-existent. Due to the absence of rivals, the disappearance of the Barcelona club also brought about that of its rivals, Torelló.

However, it is known that many of the players of the Barcelona and Torelló societies continued to practice football through other societies such as the Fomento del Sport Velocipédico (Barcelona Velocipedistas Society), the company that managed the installation of the Bonanova velodrome, which decided to encourage and continue to organize football games and other typically English Sports, but such arrangements also seem to be gone by the end of 1896. The Catalan members of the SF de Barcelona, most of whom being part of Real Club de Regatas, also continued to organize football games, especially against a local team known as the Faculty of Sciences, facing each other at the grounds near Casa Antúnez. The lines-ups of both teams were all made of Catalans except one of the Parsons brothers, and some of them were veterans of the Barcelona Society, such as Alberto Serra. For this reason, no Briton played football in Catalonia (sept for the Parsons) in 1897 and 1898.

Football in the city then crosses its first crisis, a period of lack of interest in football that lasted three years (1896–99), with only the Faculty of Sciences and the cycling fans of the Velocipédico Club continuing to play sporadically.

=== Legacy ===
The British Colony of Barcelona only began to play again in 1899, with the emergence of Team Anglès and FC Barcelona. The Parsons brothers, John and William, played a vital role in the return of football to the Catalan capital, as they were involved in the foundation of both teams. The Morris brothers and Henry W. Brown also played for Team Anglès. These two sides merged on 13 December 1899, just two weeks after Barça was founded, which meant a big leap in quality for the club, and as a result, Barcelona became one of the strongest teams in Catalonia at the turn of the century. Some of the British players that joined Barça were prominent figures in the club's early success, such as the Parsons and the Morris brothers, and also the Witty brothers (Arthur and Ernest). Some of these figures even become part of Barça's board of directors with John Parsons becoming the vice-president of the club while his brother William was appointed as the new vice-captain of the team behind Joan Gamper.

Team Anglès, which like its predecessors was also never officially established, seems to have disappeared around 1900, and never to be reformed again, but despite its very short life, the football teams of the English Colony of Barcelona left a big mark in the history of Catalan football.

== Notable players ==
- James Reeves: Founder and Captain. The undisputed leader and main driving force behind the foundations of the original entity and Sociedad de Foot-Ball de Barcelona.
- Samuel James Morris: Originally from the Barcelona Cricket Club, he was already in his 50s when he participated in the entity's first matches in 1892 and 1893, playing as a goalkeeper. In his civilian life, he was the director of two tram companies in Barcelona.
- Samuel Morris: Originally from the Barcelona Cricket Club, he played several friendly matches with them at the Hippodrome of Can Tunis and a few others at the Velódromo de la Bonanova between 1892 and 1896, where he stood out as a great scorer, but he later moved on to play as a goalkeeper.
- Enrique Morris: Originally from the Barcelona Cricket Club, he was part of this entity from 1895 to 1896 as a forward, netting once in an 8–3 victory over Torelló. He was later a winner of the 1900–01 Copa Macaya with Hispania AC, the first-ever official title in Spanish football.
- John and William Parsons: Originally from the Barcelona Cricket Club, but they only joined in 1895. John scored twice for the Reds in a match in 1895 and twice again in an 8–3 victory over Torelló, with William also scoring on the latter. They went on to be co-founders of FC Barcelona.
- Alberto Serra: Originally from Club Regatas, he was part of this entity from 1892 to 1896 as a forward. He later became the first to write a chronicle of a FC Barcelona match.
- John Beaty-Pownall: Originally from the Barcelona Cricket Club, he was part of this entity from 1892 to 1896 as a forward. He captained the Red team in 1895 and netted three goals against Torelló in 1895, one in an 8–3 home win and a brace in a 3–5 loss.
- William MacAndrews: Originally from the Barcelona Cricket Club, he was one of the main figures of this entity between 1892 and 1894, where he stood out as a great scorer, although he played in the infamous match of 12 March 1893 as a defender. He later founded the Torelló Football Association.
- George Cochran: He was one of the main figures of this entity between 1892 and 1894, captaining the Blue team in the infamous match of 12 March 1893, and later founding the Torelló Football Association and scoring in both games that Torelló played in 1895, a consolation goal in an 8–3 away loss and a first-half hat-trick in a 5–3 home victory over Barcelona.
- Jorge Barrié: Originally from Club Regatas, he was part of this entity from 1892 to 1896 as a forward, netting a goal for the Blue team in the infamous match of 12 March 1893, and another on Barça's 8–3 victory over Torelló.
- Georges Dagnière: Originally from Club Regatas, he was part of this entity from 1892 to 1895, playing as a defender. In his civilian life, he was a representative of Credit Lyonnais and a member of the French Chamber of Commerce of Barcelona.
- Henry Wood: Originally from the Barcelona Cricket Club, he was one of the main figures of this entity between 1892 and 1894, playing as both a goalkeeper and defender. He later founded the Torelló Football Association.
- Henry W. Brown: He was part of this entity from 1892 to 1896, playing as both a defender and midfielder. He played for the Red Team in the infamous match of 12 March 1893. Together with the Parsons, he was one of the few players who was part of both the Barcelona Society of 1894–96 and FC Barcelona.

== Squad ==
Source: Note: Flags indicate national team as defined under FIFA eligibility rules; some limited exceptions apply. Players may hold more than one non-FIFA nationality.

| No. | Pos. | Nation | Player |
|---|---|---|---|
| — | GK | GBR | Samuel Morris (Hispania AC) |
| — | GK | GBR | Foggon |
| — | GK | GBR | Richardson (Retired) |
| — | DF | GBR | Heucke (Retired) |
| — | DF | IRL | Matt Wilson (Distillery) |
| — | DF | GBR | J. Fallon (Escocès FC) |
| — | DF | GBR | Henry W. Brown (Team Anglès) |
| — | DF | GBR | Quiney (Retired) |
| — | MF | GBR | Shaw |
| — | MF | GBR | Longbottom |
| — | MF | GBR | Heather (Retired) |
| — | MF | GBR | Hicks |
| — | MF | GBR | Phillips (Retired) |

| No. | Pos. | Nation | Player |
|---|---|---|---|
| — | MF | FRA | Georges Dagnière |
| — | MF | FRA | Jorge Barrié (Royal Spanish Tennis Federation) |
| — | MF | GBR | Sloon |
| — | MF | GBR | Hallam |
| — | FW | GBR | Bruger |
| — | FW | CAT | Codina |
| — | FW | CAT | Tordo (Club Regatas) |
| — | FW | CAT | J. Suñé (FC Barcelona) |
| — | FW | GBR | John Beaty-Pownall |
| — | FW | CAT | Alberto Serra |
| — | FW | GBR | Enrique Morris (Hispania AC) |
| — | FW | GBR | William Parsons (Team Anglès) |
| — | FW | GBR | John Parsons (FC Barcelona) |
| — | FW | GBR | James Reeves |

Note: Only those who played for the Sociedad de Foot-Ball de Barcelona (1894–96). In total 21 Britons (including the Parsons brothers, born in Barcelona, and the Morris brothers, born in the Philippines, as well as the Irish international Matt Wilson), 2 Frenchmen (Georges Dagnière and Jorge Barrié), and 7 Catalans.

== Results ==
Barcelona Football Club

| 25 December 1892 | English Colony of Barcelona (Reds) | ? – ? | Club Regatas de Barcelona (Blues) | Can Tunis, Sants |
| 8:00 | | Report | | Stadium: Field near the Hippodrome of Can Tunis |
Note: First known football match in Catalonia. Very little is known about that Christmas Day in 1892, only that the venue was near the Hippodrome, and that Reeves was the captain of one of the teams.

| 3–5 February 1893 Training match | English Colony of Barcelona (Reds) | ? – ? | Club Regatas de Barcelona (Blues) | Can Tunis, Sants |
| 15:00 | | Report | | Stadium: Field near the Hippodrome of Can Tunis |
Note: The English team fielded some "amateur English fans" and the local press stated that "if this game turns out well, it will probably be repeated often".

| 12 March 1893 Training match | Blue Team | 2–1 | Red Team | Can Tunis, Sants |
| 16:00 | Figueras; Barrié Wood; Park, Dagnière; Lockie, S. Morris, Barrié; Bell, Higgins, Cochran, Noble, Figueras | Report | Reeves Morris Sr. Richardson, Brown; Tuñi, Chofre, MacAndrews; Serra, Daunt, Reeves, Dumsday, Beaty-Pownall | Stadium: Hippodrome of Can Tunis; Attendance: 300; Miguel Morris; Referee: Alfredo Collett |
Note: The last game of the 1892–93 season.

| 8 December 1893 Friendly match | English Colony of Barcelona | 4–1 | Scottish colony of Sant Martí | Can Tunis, Sants |
| | MacAndrews; Reeves; S. Morris | Report | Dykes | Stadium: Hippodrome of Can Tunis; Referee: (Scotland) William Mauchan |

| 11 March 1894 Friendly match | Scottish colony of Sant Martí | 1–2 | English Colony of Barcelona | Sant Martí, Barcelona |
| | Brown | Report | White; Gold | Stadium: A field in Sant Martí; Referee: (Scotland) William Mauchan |

| 15 April 1894 Friendly match | English Colony of Barcelona | 3–0 | Scottish colony of Sant Martí | Can Tunis, Sants |
| | Pownall; Reeves; MacAndrews | Report | | Stadium: Hippodrome of Can Tunis; Referee: (United Kingdom) ? |
Note: John Beaty-Pownall was still three months shy of his 20th birthday, thus becoming the very first documented teenager in Catalan football to score a goal, official or otherwise.

Sociedad de Foot-Ball de Barcelona

| 8 December 1894 Training match | Red Team | 3–1 | Blue Team | Can Tunis, Sants |
| | Cochran 3–1' | Report | | Stadium: Hippodrome of Can Tunis |
Note: Cochran led the Red Team while Reeves captained the Blues.

| 27 January 1895 Training match | Blue Team | 4–1 | Red Team | Barcelona |
| 15:00 | W. Parsons; H. Morris | La Vanguardia | S. Morris | Stadium: Velódromo de la Bonanova |
Note: First match at the Velódromo de la Bonanova.

| 2 February 1895 Training match | Blue Team | 1–4 | Red Team | Barcelona |
| | Reeves Foggon; Heather, S. Morris, Heucke; Shaw, Longbottom; Serra, H. Morris, Tordo, Reeves (c). | La Vanguardia | J. Parsons; Beaty-Pownall; Phillips Richardson; Dagnière, Phillips, Hicks; Brown, Barrié; J. Parsons, W. Parsons, Beaty-Pownall (c), Suñé, Codina. | Stadium: Velódromo de la Bonanova |
Note: The Blues played with only 10 men.

| 24 March 1895 Friendly match | Sociedad de Foot-Ball de Barcelona | 8–3 | Torelló Football Association | Barcelona |
| 15:00 | Reeves; J. Parsons; Barrié; Fallon; H. Morris; Beaty-Pownall; W. Parsons S. Morris; Fallon, Wilson, Brown; Barrié, Sloon; J. Parsons, W. Parsons, H. Morris, Beaty-Pownall, Reeves | La Vanguardia5; La Vanguardia6 | Cochran; Inglés; A. Tong C. Torella; Wood, Inglés; Park, Dumsday, Daunt, Bell, A. Tong, MacAndrews, Cochran, Greaves | Stadium: Velódromo de la Bonanova; Attendance: 3,000 |

| 14 April 1895 Friendly match | Torelló Football Association | 5–3 | Sociedad de Foot-Ball de Barcelona | Torelló, Osona |
| 15:00 | Cochran 1T' 1T' 1T' ? 2T' ? 2T' C. Torella; Wood, S. Inglés; Park, Dumsday, Daunt, Bell, A. Tong, MacAndrews, Armstrong, Cochran | La Vanguardia | Beaty-Pownall 2T' 2T'; J. Parsons 2T' S. Morris; Richardson, Quiney, Brown; Heather, Sloon; J. Parsons, W. Parsons, H. Morris, Beaty-Pownall, Reeves | Stadium: A field in Torelló; Attendance: 3,000 |
Note: The field was a sloping and flooded ground.

Club de Regatas

| 1895 | Club de Regatas | v | Faculty of Sciences | Barcelona |
| | Artús; G. Busquets, Castellví; Serra, Parsons, Pascual; J. Busquets, Germá, Solé, Suñé and Perdigó | Cihefe | C. Torella; G. Rodríguez, Urcola; Brugués, Gallifa, Moles, S. Inglés, Vilardebó, M. González, Roca, Montañés | Stadium: Field near Casa Antúnez. |

== See also ==
Football in Catalonia
