= 1893 Blues v Reds football match =

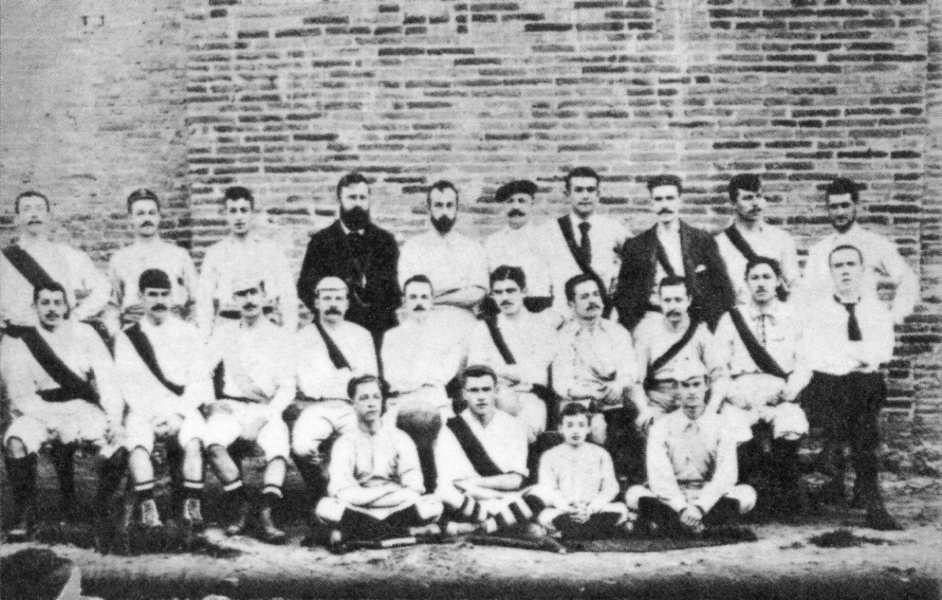
- The Blues and the Reds (with a stripe), plus the referee, just before the match.
- Event: Pioneering football game in Catalonia
Blue Team	Red Team
2	1
- Date: 12 March 1893
- Venue: Hippodrome of Can Tunis, Barcelona
- Attendance: 100; Miguel Morris

On 12 March 1893, one of the first football matches in Catalonia took place at the Hippodrome of Can Tunis, Barcelona. The match was contested by the members of the Barcelona Football Club, who were divided into two teams: one dressed in red led by James Reeves and the other one in blue captained by George Cockram.

The game was won by the Blues 2–1 with goals from the Catalans Figueras and Jorge Barrié, while the red's consolation was netted by the Englishmen Mr. Reeves, but more important than the result and its goalscorers, was its historical significance, given that this match was the subject of the first proper chronicle of the dispute of a football match in Spain, which appeared in La Dinastía on 16 March, written by Enrique Font Valencia, who detailed the aspects of the game, including lineups, the color of the clothes, the name of the referee, the result and the goalscorers. Moreover, the photograph of these two sides just before the match is widely regarded as the oldest image of a football team in Spain. According to the chronicle, the match took place at four in the afternoon, in a field near the Hippodrome of Can Tunis, and it concludes by assuring that this group will keep promoting the sport of football in the years to come.

== Background ==
Football first entered Catalonia thanks to the British colony that worked and lived there, among whom a certain James Reeves stood out. He arrived in Barcelona at some point in 1892, a time when football was a sport practically unknown in the city, but since he was an enthusiastic and passionate lover of the game, he decided to create his own club which would include Britons and Catalans alike. Being the spokesman for the British members of Club Regatas de Barcelona (a club of rowing and sailing), he convinced a number of Britons, Catalan and French members of the Regatas Club to practice football. Reeves did the same with some British cricketers belonging to the Barcelona Cricket Club of Ronda de Sant Pere.

This group of football pioneers, simply known as Barcelona Football Club, organized and played the first known football match in the city on 25 December 1892 in Can Tunis in a field located between the hippodrome and the Civil Arsenal, however, very little is known about that Christmas Day. Reeves kept organizing football games between the members of the Barcelona Football Club, including a match on 2 February 1893 between members of Club Regatas (Blues) and of Cricket Club (Reds). In the following month, on 12 March 1893, the Blues faced the Reds again in the last game of the season (at the time, football was an autumn-winter sport).

== Photogravure ==
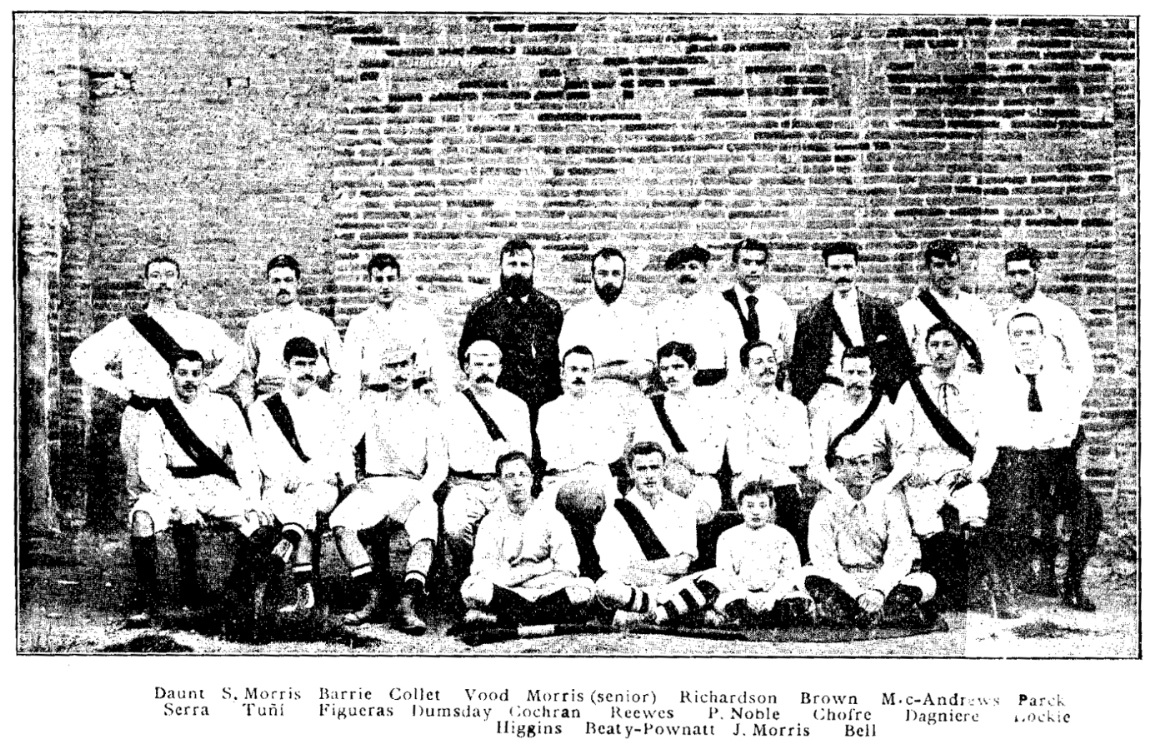
The two sides of the then-existing Barcelona Football Club. This photograph is widely regarded to be the oldest image of a football team in Spain.

Several years after the game, specifically on 6 January 1906, Joaquim Escardó of Los Deportes published a report about the football practiced in the 1890s in Barcelona and especially on this match played on 12 March 1893. In the article, there is a photogravure of the 22 footballers who played that match, plus the referee (dressed in black) and a young boy who watched from the stands (Sat on the floor). Escardó did not date it exactly (“The two sides of the then-existing Barcelona Football Club formed around the years from 1892 to 1895...”), but the players and referee in Escardó's photogravure match exactly with the line-ups of the chronicle by Valencia in 1893, which proves that this engraving corresponds to the game played on 12 March, thus being the first documented image of a football team in Spain. Catalan football historian Agustin Rodes wrongly dated this photograph to even earlier, to 1892, identifying it as the team of a Methodist church in Barcelona, which is also not true, since most of them were Catholic.

The caption names all the figures and goes as follows: Daunt, S. Morris, Barrié, Collet, Wood, Morris (senior), Richardson, Brown, MacAndrews, Park, Serra, Tuñí, Figueras, Dumsday, Cochran (Cockram), Reewes (Reeves), P. Noble, Chofre, Dagnière, Lockie, Higgins, Beaty-Pownall, J. Morris and Bell. S. Morris stands for Samuel (standing, second from the left), the oldest of the Morris brothers, while J. Morris stands for Miguel, who was known as Junior due to being the youngest sibling of the Morris family. This meant that Escardó could not use neither the S. or the J. to identify their father, Samuel James Morris (wearing a beret), who was known in Catalonia as Jaime, so Escardó opted to use "Morris senior" instead. Oddly enough, Junior and senior turned out to be very fitting terms for Miguel and Jaime as they were the youngest and oldest individuals in this image, with Miguel being a boy of just 13 while his father had just turned 51.

The 24 individuals seem to have been aligned and organized by groups. For instance, the four figures who are seated on the floor in the first row are most likely the youngest of the group, with a 13-year-old Morris, an 18-year-old Beaty-Pownall, and two other young-looking players, Bell and Higgins; while the oldest figures of the group are standing in the third row, also side-by-side, the 51-year-old Morris, the 28-year-old Wood, and the referee Collet. Coincidentally, the former two were the goalkeepers of each team. Then, in the second row, the first three figures from the left are the Catalans of the group, Serra, Tuñí, and Figueras (members of Club Regatas); the last three include two Frenchmen; while the middle of the second row, and thus the center of the image, was occupied by the captains of each team, Reeves and Cockram, with each having a "vice-captain" (Dumsday and Noble) between them and the aforementioned foreigners. In addition to the Morris brothers and the captains, other notable figures in the photo include MacAndrews and Wood, two of the founders of the Barcelona Cricket Club.

== Overview ==
The blue team, which was captained by Mr. Cochran, had Lockie, as guard; Wood and Chofre, as rear guard; Barrié, Park and Higgins forming the avant-garde half; and P. Noble, Bell, Morris (son), and Figueras the vanguard. Among the incarnations (reds), which was captained by Mr. Reeves, Morris (father), was the guard; the rear guard was made up of MacAndrews and Tuñi; the middle vanguard by Dumsday, Brown and Richardson, and the vanguard by Beaty Pownatt, Serra, Daunt, and Dagnière. Mr. Collett acted as field judge.

— The match chronicle written by Enrique Font Valencia of La Dinastía on 16 March 1893.

Since the figure of a coach as we know it today did not yet exist, it was James Reeves who, as the undisputed leader of the club, was in charge of making up the line-ups and dictating the tactics to be followed. Although the players in Valencia's chronicle from 1893 match perfectly with those of Escardó's report in 1906, their positions vary slightly.

The way and how the line-ups were chosen remains unknown, because the three Catalans and the four Frenchmen were on opposite teams. Initially, the Morris were meant to play together for the Blues since none of them was wearing the red band when the photo was taken, but apparently, something happened in the last minute as they ended up in opposite teams, with Samuel playing for the Blues as a forward while his father represented the Reds as a goalkeeper, and despite his advanced age, he managed to keep his son at bay in a 1–2 loss. Morris senior joining the Reds in a last-minute decision meant that one of the Reds had to be hastily implemented in the Blues teams, and in fact, the match chronicle by Valencia in 1893 states that Chofre, who had a red band in the photo, played for the Blues, while Escardó's report of 1906 states that this figure was Dagnière.

Admission was free and there were plenty of curious friends of the town's football players. The blue team was captained by George Cockram and the red one was led by Mr. Reeves, who captained by example, netting his side's only goal in a 1–2 loss. Notably, both Blue goals were scored by non-Britons, Figueras and Barrié, meaning that Reeves's inclusion of foreigners was paying off, as they showed they could play football just as well as its inventors.

== Final details ==
12 March 1893
16:00

Blue Team	2–1	Red Team
Figueras; Barrié	1906 Report	Reeves

Hippodrome of Can Tunis, Barcelona, Catalonia
Attendance: 100
Referee: Alfredo Collett

GK	1	(England) Henry Wood (Cricket Club)
DF	2	(England) Park
DF	3	(France) Georges Dagnière (Club Regatas)
MF	4	(England) Lockie
MF	5	(Philippines) Samuel Morris (Cricket Club)
MF	6	(France) Jorge Barrié
FW	7	(England) Bell
FW	8	(England) Higgins
FW	9	(Scotland) George Cockram
FW	10	(England) Ubaldo Noble
FW	11	(Catalonia) Figueras (Club Regatas)

GK	1	(Philippines) Samuel James Morris (Cricket Club)
DF	2	(England) Richardson (Cricket Club)
DF	3	(England) Henry W. Brown
MF	4	(Catalonia) Tuñi (Club Regatas)
MF	5	(France) Chofre (Club Regatas)
MF	6	(Scotland) William MacAndrews (Cricket Club)
FW	7	(Catalonia) Alberto Serra (Club Regatas)
FW	8	(France) Daunt (Club Regatas)
FW	9	(England) James Reeves
FW	10	(England) Dumsday (Cricket Club)
FW	11	(England) John Beaty-Pownall (Cricket Club)

== Aftermath ==
This group of football pioneers in the city kept organizing football matches and promoting the sport, and in late 1894, they move to the Velódromo de la Bonanova, as they were looking for a place of easier access to the city center, and from then on, Sunday football games became a regular event at Bonanova, and although its vast majority were training matches (Blues vs Reds), they also began to play against teams from other cities, such as Torelló, which at that time constituted a novelty, and as a result, football in Catalonia kept growing.

== See also ==
- Football in Catalonia
