= Henry Wood (footballer) =

English footballer

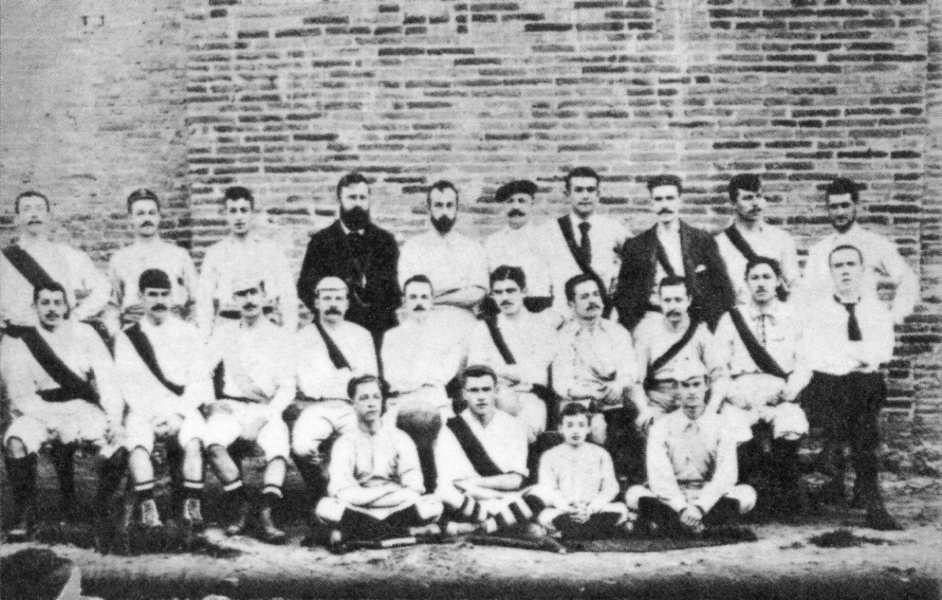
- Wood (standing, fifth from the left) in 1893

Personal information
- Full name: Henry Elwes Wood
- Date of birth: 1865
- Place of birth: England
- Date of death: 1907 (aged 41–42)
- Place of death: Unknown
- Position: Defender

Senior career*
Years	Team	Apps	(Gls)
1892–1894	Barcelona Football Club	+3	(+1)
1895	Torelló Foot-ball Association	2	
- * Club domestic league appearances and goals

Henry Elwes Wood (1865 – 1907) was an English football pioneer who played as a defender for some of the earliest Catalan clubs in existence such as Barcelona Cricket Club and Barcelona Football Club.

== Playing career ==
Wood was born in 1865 as the son of Henry Wood and Isabella Matilda Elwes, who had eight children, six girls and two boys. He moved to Barcelona in the late 1880s due to work reasons, and like so many other Britons who moved to the Catalan capital, Wood soon joined the British Club of Barcelona on La Rambla dels Capuchins, where he was one of the founders of the Barcelona Cricket Club, a sport he also practiced. In 1892, he met James Reeves, who was recruiting football enthusiasts to create a well-organized football club, and despite being the captain of the cricket club, Wood joined him since he had been impressed by his passionate and entrepreneurial spirit. Together with Reeves and some other football pioneers in the city, such as the Morris brothers (Samuel, Enrique, and Miguel), who were also members of the cricket team, they formed the Barcelona Football Club in late 1892.

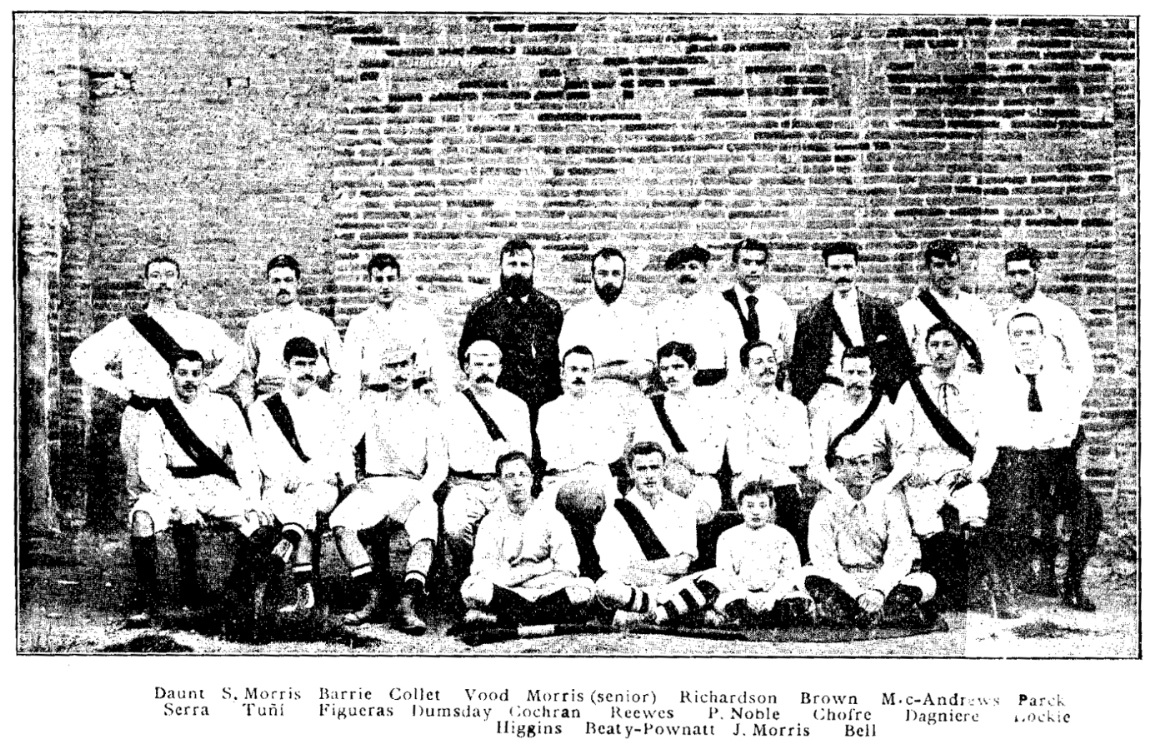
Wood appears in the oldest image of a football team in Spain. He can be seen standing in the third row, the fifth from the left, with a beard, alongside the referee Alfredo Collet.

This entity organized the first known football match in the city, which was held at Hippodrome of Can Tunis on 25 December 1892. It remains unclear if he played in this match. However, he did play on 12 March 1893, in the historic match between a blue and a red team, starting as a defender for the former in a 1–2 win. Wood appears in what is regarded to be the oldest photograph of a football team in Spain, which depicts these two sides before the match at Can Tunis. He can be seen standing with a black beard alongside the referee of the game, Alfredo Collet, and Enrique Morris. Wood played several training matches (Blues vs Reds) at Can Tunis and a few others at Bonanova between 1892 and 1895, the last of which with Torelló Foot-ball Association, however, due to the little statistical rigor that the newspapers had at that time, the exact number of matches and goals (if any) he performed is unknown. In 1895, he played as a defender for Torelló in two matches against Sociedad de Foot-Ball de Barcelona, which marked the first time that teams from two different cities played against each other in Catalonia.

== Later life ==
He married Katherine Margaret Beaty-Pownall (1869–1942), the sister of John Beaty-Pownall, who also played for the Barcelona Cricket Club and the Barcelona Football Club. The couple had two children, Elizabeth "Betty" in 1896 and Henry in 1902. Henry Wood died in 1907 at the age of 41 or 42, thus leaving his wife a widow. She married shortly after, however, with James Revees and they had an only child in 1910, John Pownall Reeves.
