= Emilio Gaissert =

Swiss footballer

Personal information
- Full name: Emilio Max Gaissert
- Birth name: Emil Max Gaissert
- Date of birth: 22 June 1883
- Place of birth: Barcelona, Catalonia, Spain
- Date of death: 11 July 1946 (aged 63)
- Place of death: Barcelona, Catalonia, Spain
- Position: Midfielder

Senior career*
| Years | Team | Apps | (Gls) |
| 1903–1904 | FC Barcelona | 1 | (0) |
- * Club domestic league appearances and goals

Emilio Max Gaissert (22 June 1883 – 11 July 1946) was a Spanish merchant and a footballer who played as a midfielder for FC Barcelona in 1903 and 1904, although he only played in one official match in the 1902–03 Copa Barcelona.

== Early life ==
Gaissert was born on 22 June 1883 in Barcelona, as the son of Émile Gaissert (1857–), a Swiss merchant who moved to Barcelona for work reasons, being registered at the Swiss consulate in Barcelona in 1883, the same year that he had his first son, who was only registered in 1903, when he was already 20 years old. His father became a delegate of the Zurich Company in Barcelona in 1884 and then a responsible delegate of the Swiss Benevolent Society, as well as a prominent member of the Evangelical Church of Barcelona. Émile Gaissert was an uncle of Joan Gamper, who was, therefore, cousin of Emil.

Gamper arrived in Barcelona in 1898 to visit his uncle Émile, who welcomed him in his house in Sant Gervasi de Cassoles in the no. 25 Sant Josep street. Émile convinced him to stay, since the opportunities offered by the city, which had just emerged from the 1888 Barcelona Universal Exposition, were many, and eventually, Gamper founded FC Barcelona. His father Émile was able to contribute financially to the foundation of FC Barcelona.

== Playing career ==
Gaissert finally joined the ranks of FC Barcelona in 1903, playing only three matches with them, making his debut in a Copa Barcelona match against X Sporting Club on 1 February 1903, which ended in a 13–0 victory, partly thanks to a 9-goal haul from his cousin. By playing in this match, Gaissert was part of the squad that then won the Copa Barcelona title. However, this was also the only official match that he ever played for the club since his next two appearances with the first team were both in friendly matches, including in FC Barcelona's international debut on 1 May 1904, in which he started as a forward against Stade Olympien des Etudiants de Toulouse (SOET) in Toulouse, the club's first-ever trip abroad.

Some publications wrongly confuse him with his fellow FC Barcelona Swiss player Emilio Gass, stating that "Gass" was a pseudonym used by him.

== Professional career ==
Professionally, he was a merchant, or "commerçant". The Gaisserts were also linked to freemasonry, and in fact, the colours of FC Barcelona might have their origins in a lodge, the one to which the Gaissert, a relative of the founder of the club, belonged. Their links to freemasonry also most likely led them to a close friendship with other key families in the history of the club, such as the Saint Nobles (George Saint Noble, known as "brother electricity", and the footballers George and Royston Saint Noble) and Samuel James Morris, the father of the Morris brothers.

== Death ==
Gaissert died in Barcelona on 11 July 1946, at the age of .

== Honours ==
FC Barcelona

- Copa Barcelona:
  - Winners (1): 1902–03
