= Alberto Serra =

Spanish footballer

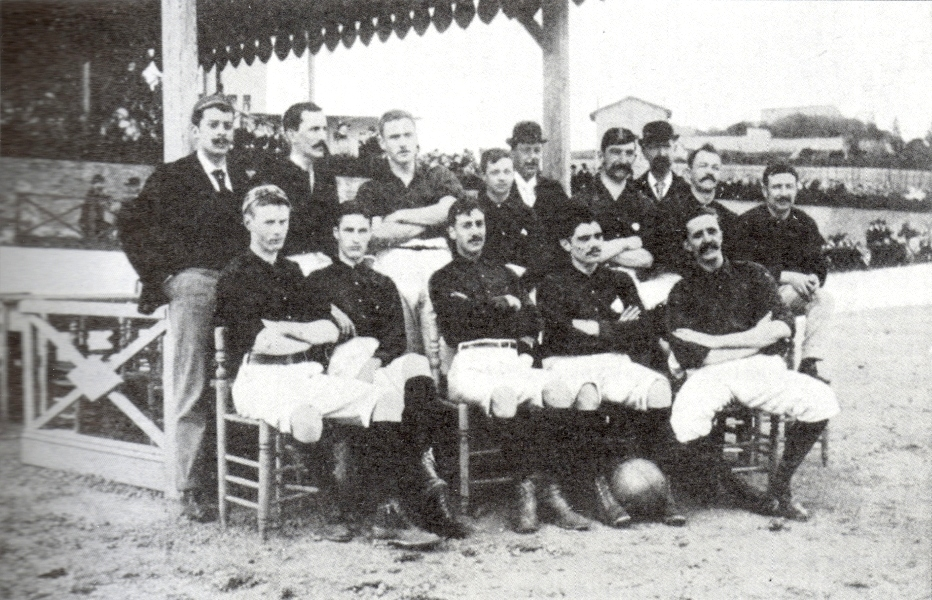
- In a football match in 1895, Alberto Serra appears standing, with his hands in his pockets, the first from the left.

8th President of Catalan Football Federation
- In office 1909–1910
- Preceded by: Rafael Degollada
- Succeeded by: Eugeni Beltri
Association football career
- Full name: Alberto Serra Guixà
- Birth name: Albert Serra Guixà
- Date of birth: 20 October 1870
- Place of birth: Barcelona, Catalonia, Spain
- Date of death: 28 July 1912 (aged 41)
- Place of death: Barcelona, Catalonia, Spain
- Position: Forward
Senior career*
Years	Team	Apps	(Gls)
1892–1894	Barcelona Football Club	+3	(?)
1895	Sociedad de Foot-Ball de Barcelona	2	(0)
- * Club domestic league appearances and goals

Alberto Serra Guixà (10 October 1870 – 28 July 1912) was a Spanish football pioneer and sports journalist, who is best known for writing and signing the first chronicle of a FC Barcelona match, which appeared on page 7 of La Vanguardia on 9 December 1899. He also wrote and was director of the Los Deportes magazine, but it was in La Vanguardia where Serra exerted his greatest informative display, for almost twenty years, and where he managed to create an outstanding weekly section under the heading "Sports Sheet" in which he became a fervent disseminator of the regulations of football. He is considered "the dean" of sports reporters in Barcelona.

As a player, Serra took part in some of the earliest Catalan clubs in existence such as Barcelona Football Club and Sociedad de Foot-Ball de Barcelona, serving both teams as a forward. He was a firm promoter of sports activity, so besides football, a sport to which he owes his career, he also practiced and wrote articles about other modalities such as rowing and fencing. He was also a lawyer and municipal judge, and he even held the presidency of the Catalan Football Federation from October 1909 to 1910.

== Playing career ==
Born in the then-independent municipality of Sarria on 20 October 1870. Serra began his sporting career with the practice of rowing and his first articles were published in the magazine of the Club Regatas de Barcelona. His first contact with football was in 1892, when the Englishmen James Reeves, the spokesman for the British members of Club Regatas (or British Club Regatas), approached the club's Catalan members to propose the idea of creating a well-organized football club. At that time, football was a sport practically unknown in the city, so most ignored him, but Serra, a sports lover, decided to give it a try after being convinced by Reeves's enthusiasm and passion. Together with Reeves and some other football pioneers in the city, such as George Cockram, the Morris brothers (Samuel and Enrique) and Henry W. Brown, they formed the Barcelona Football Club in late 1892. Serra was the figurehead of the team's Catalan members who, together with him, were crucial in its success.

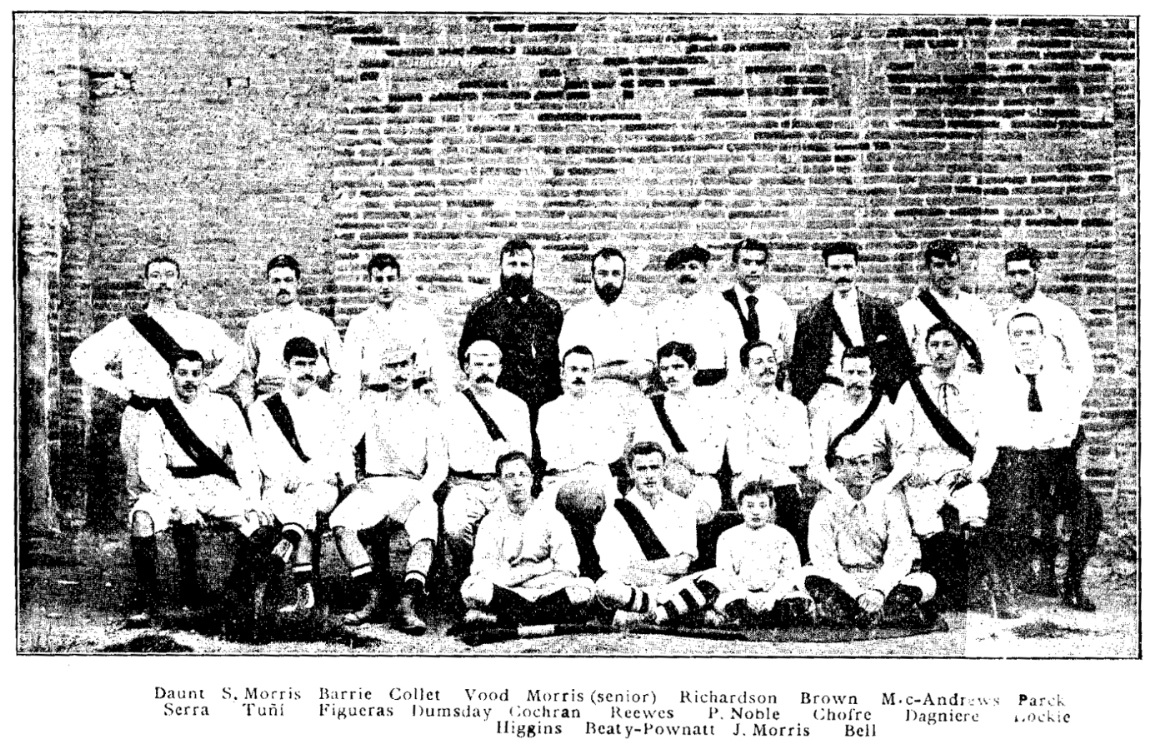
Serra appears in the oldest photo of a football team in Spain, on 12 March 1893. He can be seen seated in the second row, the first from the left, alongside fellow Catalans Tuñi and Figueras.

This entity held the first known football match in the city, which was held at Hippodrome of Can Tunis on 25 December 1892. It remains unclear if he actually played in this match. However, it is known that he played on 12 March 1893, in the historic match between a blue team captained by Mr. Cockram and a red one led by Reeves, representing the latter in a 1–2 loss, with both Blue goals coming from Catalans (Figueras and Barrié). The photograph of these two sides just before the match is widely regarded as the oldest photo of a football team in Spain. Moreover, this match was the subject of the first proper chronicle of the dispute of a football match, which appears in the newspaper La Dinastia on 16 March 1893, written by Enrique Font Valencia. Serra played several friendly matches at Can Tunis and a few others at the Velódromo de la Bonanova between 1892 and 1895, the last of which with Sociedad de Foot-Ball de Barcelona, however, due to the little statistical rigor that the newspapers had at that time, the exact number of matches and goals he performed is unknown.

Albert Serra daily day could begin by performing justice in his position as municipal judge of Sarrià, and end by dropping by the offices of La Vanguardia to collect his notes. And if he had a few hours, go to the port to row or swim

— Narciso Masferrer

== The Chronicle of 1899 ==
On 22 October 1899, Gamper placed an advert in Los Deportes, a magazine for which Serra also wrote, to find players interested in forming a football team, and a positive response resulted in the foundation of "Futbol Club Barcelona" on 29 November 1899. The club played its first-ever match at the Bonanova on 8 December 1899, and Serra was among the presents as a journalist for La Vanguardia, and thus, on the following day, on 9 December 1899, while its front page commented on the Catalan demands for an economic concert, the page number 7 reported the detailed chronicle of the first match in the history of FC Barcelona. In his chronicle, Serra reports on the triumph of FC Barcelona by 2 to 0, and describes the first lineups of the two teams, the color of the clothes, the name of the referee and the result, and concludes by assuring that "warmly congratulate the Barcelona foot-ball club that opens its sessions with such good auspices". He also reports the dirty game of the player of FC Barcelona, Fitzmaurice, but Serra had to rectify this statement days later.

== Personal life ==
Serra married Josefina Bertrán Pedrosa in December 1902, which led him to expand his activities with the management of the family business inherited by his wife, the liquor factory that distilled Aromas de Montserrat, located in Esparreguera. He had four children, Alberto, Federico, Joaquín and José María.

Feeling ill, in the first months of 1912, Serra retired, dying on 28 July due to a cerebral hemorrhage. Serra was barely 41 years old and his loss was much mourned in the pages of the Barcelona press at the time. In addition to his obituary appearing on the cover of La Vanguardia on 29 July 1912, he was remembered for brilliant pens of that time, such as Narciso Masferrer or Ricardo Cabot, both of which also presided over the Catalan Football Federation (in 1913 and 1915 respectively).
