= Street names of Holborn =

This is a list of the etymology of street names in the London district of Holborn. Holborn has no formally defined boundaries - those utilised here are: Theobald’s Road to the north, Gray's Inn Road and the City of London boundary to the east, Victoria Embankment/the Thames to the south, and Lancaster Place, the north-west curve of the Aldwych semi-circle, Kingsway/Southampton Row to the west.

Streets in the Hatton Garden sub-district are covered in Hatton Garden#Street name etymologies

- Aldwych: from Old English ‘Ealdwic’ or ‘Aldwic’, meaning ‘old settlement’, given by Anglo-Saxons referring to a Danish settlement here of the 9th century
- Andrews Crosse: after a Tudor-era inn here of this name
- Arundel Street: after Arundel House which formerly stood on this site
- Bedford Row: from Peter Harpur of Bedford, a local landowner who laid this street out in the early 18th century
- Bell Yard: after the Bell Inn, which stood here in the 16th century
- Bishop’s Court: formerly led to the palace of the Bishop of Chichester, built in the 13th century
- Brownlow Street: after William Brownlow, who built this street in the 17th century; his family had held land in the area since the 16th century
- Carey Street: after Nicholas Carey, who lived in this area, or Sir George Carey
- Catton Street: after the painter Charles Catton who lived nearby in the 18th century
- Chancery Lane: the former site of Edward III’s office of the Master of the Rolls of Chancery
- Chichester Rents: formerly a street of rented houses leading to the palace of the Bishop of Chichester in the 13th century
- Clare Market: the former site of a butcher’s market on land owned by John Holles, Earl of Clare, who lived nearby
- Clement’s Inn, Clement’s Inn Passage and Clement’s Lane: after the nearby St Clement Danes church
- Clerkenwell Road: from a local well ('the clerk's well'), which gave its name to the area and this district
- Dane Street: from the church of St Clement Danes on Aldwych, which owned land in the area
- Devereux Court: from the Devereaux family, earls of Essex, who occupied Essex House on this site in Tudor times
- Dog and Duck Yard
- Drake Street: thought to be after an early 18th-century builder of this name
- Eagle Street: named after an inn here in the 18th century
- Essex Street and Little Essex Street: the former site of a townhouse belonging to the earls of Essex
- Field Court
- Fisher Street: after Thomas Fisher, a local 16th-century landowner
- Fleet Street: after the now covered river Fleet which flowed near here
- French Horn Yard: unknown; the entrance to this yard is now covered by development, and though it still exists between nos. 87 and 90 and High Holborn it is no longer generally accessible to the public
- Fulwood Place: after Sir George Fulwood, 16th-century member of Gray's Inn
- Grange Court: thought to be a descriptive name dating from the Middle Ages when this was farmland
- Gray’s Inn Place, Gray's Inn Road and Gray's Inn Square: from Lord Gray of Wilton, owner of a local inn or town house which was later leased to lawyers in the 16th century
- Great Turnstile, Little Turnstile Street and New Turnstile Gate: after turnstiles that stood here in the 17th century
- Greyhound Court: thought to be after a former inn of this name
- Hand Court: thought to be from a former shop sign advertising gloves or a tailor
- High Holborn, Holborn, Holborn Circus and Holborn Place: thought to be from ‘hollow bourne’ i.e. the river Fleet which formerly flowed in a valley near here. The ‘High’ stems from the fact that the road led away from the river to higher ground. Circus is a British term for a road junction.
- Houghton Street: after John Holles, second Baron Houghton, who built the street in the 1650s
- India Place: after the adjacent Indian High Commission
- Jockey’s Fields: thought to date from the old custom of the Lord Mayor and retainers on horseback inspecting the nearby conduit on the river Tyburn
- Kingsway: named in honour of Edward VII, reigning king when this road was completed in 1906
- Lamb’s Conduit Passage: after a conduit built by William Lambe in the 16th century to bring clean water from the countryside north of London
- Lancaster Place: the former site of the Savoy Palace. It passed into the ownership of the earls of Lancaster in the 13th century, the most famous of which was John of Gaunt, who owned the palace at the time of its destruction in Peasant’s Revolt of 1381
- Lincoln's Inn Fields: after Lincoln’s Inn, the townhouse of the Lacy family, earls of Lincoln, later leased to lawyers in the 14th century
- Maltravers Street: built on the site of the former Arundel House; since 1415 the title of Baron Maltravers has been joined to that of Earl of Arundel
- Melbourne Place: after Melbourne in Australia, as the Australian High Commission is on this site
- Milford Lane: origin unknown, though possibly from a Thames mill located on this site in former times
- Montreal Place: after Montreal in Canada
- Newman’s Row: after Arthur Newman, who built the street in the mid-1600s
- New Inn Passage: as this formerly led to the New Inn, one of the Inns of Chancery
- New Square and New Square Passage: named simply as it was new when built by Henry Serle
- Old North Street: as it leads northwards from Red Lions Square, ‘Old’ to contract with New North Street which continues northwards
- Old Buildings and Old Square: gained this name after the building of New Square in 1682
- Portsmouth Street: a house belonging to Louise de Kérouaille, Duchess of Portsmouth, mistress of Charles II, stood on this site
- Portugal Street: named in honour of Charles II’s Portuguese queen Catherine of Braganza, or possibly after the Portuguese embassy which was formerly located here
- Princeton Street: formerly ‘Prince Street’, though after which prince exactly is unknown. It was changed to avoid confusion with other Prince Streets.
- Procter Street: after the 19th-century poet Bryan Waller Procter, who lived at Red Lion Square
- Raymond Buildings: after Lord Chief Justice Raymond, who was called to the bar at Gray's Inn in 1697
- Red Lion Square and Red Lion Street: from the 17th-century Red Lion Inn, now demolished
- Remnant Street: after James Farquharson Remnant, 1st Baron Remnant, a lawyer at Lincoln’s Inn and later MP for Holborn
- River Terrace: presumably as it overlooks the river Thames
- Sandland Street
- Sardinia Street: after the embassy of the Kingdom of Sardinia and its associated chapel, formerly located on this site
- Serle Street: after Henry Serle, who built the street in the 1680s
- Sheffield Street
- Southampton Row: Southampton House, home of the earls of Southampton, formerly stood here in the 16th century
- South Square: from its location in the south of Gray's Inn
- Star Yard: after the former Starre Tavern here
- Stone Buildings
- Strand and Strand Lane: an archaic word for an edge of water; the River Thames formerly reached here before the building of the Thames Embankment
- Surrey Steps and Surrey Street: built on the site of Arundel House; the earldoms of Arundel and Surrey have been united since 1575
- Temple Place: after the nearby Inner Temple and Middle Temple
- Theobald's Road: this road formerly formed part of a route used by Stuart monarchs to their hunting grounds at Theobalds House, Hertfordshire
- Three Cups Yard: named after a local inn of this name in the 18th century
- Tweezer’s Alley
- Twyford Place: after Twyford, Berkshire, home of James Farquharson Remnant, 1st Baron Remnant for whom Remnant Street is named
- Victoria Embankment: after Queen Victoria, reigning queen at the time of the building of the Thames Embankment
- Vere Street: between Clare Market at its eastern end and Duke Street (which, via Prince's Street, itself connected to Drury Lane) at its western end. Demolished around 1900.
- Warwick Court: site of the townhouse of Gray’s Inn lawyer Robert Rich, Baron Rich who was created Earl of Warwick in 1618
- Water Street: formerly ran to the waterline of the Thames, before the building of the Thames Embankment
- Whetstone Park: built by William Whetstone in 1636
- Yorkshire Grey Yard: named after an inn of this name in the 18th century, presumably referring to the breed of horse
