= Miguel Morris =

Spanish footballer

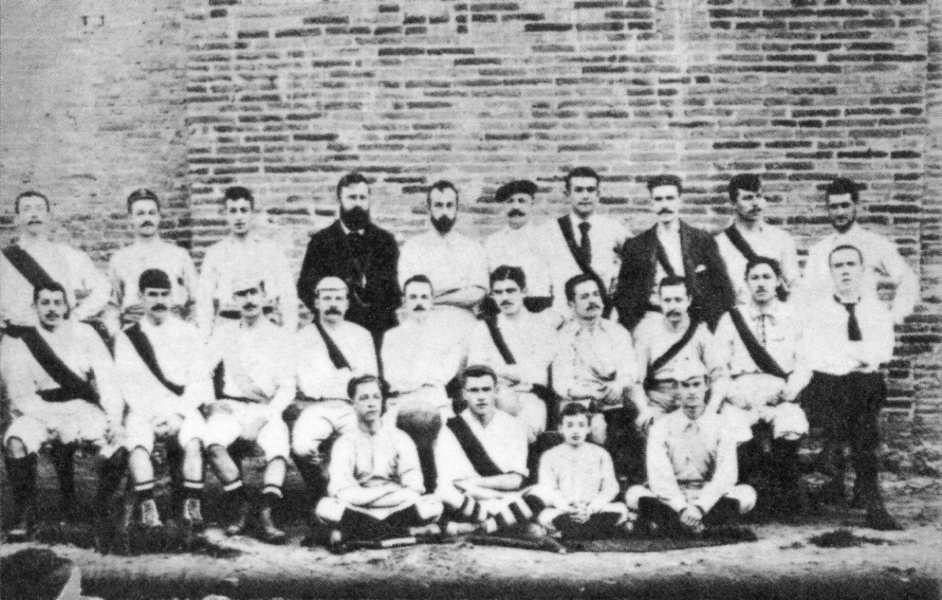
- Miguel Morris (sat on the floor, the third from the left) still as a child in 1893.

Personal information
- Full name: Miguel Samuel Morris Yrisarry
- Date of birth: 20 August 1880
- Place of birth: Manila, Philippines, Spanish Empire
- Date of death: 16 July 1951 (aged 70)
- Place of death: Barcelona, Catalonia, Spain
- Position: Defender

Youth career
- 1893: Barcelona Football Club

Senior career*
Years	Team	Apps	(Gls)
1901–1902	Hispania AC		
1902	FC Barcelona	2	(0)
1902–1903	Hispania AC		
1903–1905	FC Barcelona		
1905–1906	Moncloa FC		
1906–1908	Sociedad Gimnástica		
1908–1909	FC Barcelona		
1909	FC Star		
1912–1914	Català FC		
- AD Canigó
- Canadiense FC

International career
1903	Barcelona	3	(1)
1905	Catalonia	1	(0)
- * Club domestic league appearances and goals

Miguel Samuel Morris Yrisarry, also known as Junior Morris or Morris III (20 August 1880 – 16 July 1951), was an Anglo-Filipino of British descent who played football as a defender for Spanish club FC Barcelona between 1902 and 1909, being a member of the Barça side that reached the final of the 1902 Copa de la Coronación.

He closely followed the steps of his older stepbrothers, Samuel and Enrique, playing alongside them in Hispania AC, FC Barcelona, and Star FC. He also appeared with them in the oldest photo of a football team in Spain in 1893, when he was still a boy of 13.

== Early life ==
Miguel Morris was born on 20 August 1880 in the Philippines, as the son of the English businessman and engineer Samuel James Morris Campbell (1842–1909) and Victorina Juliana Yrisarry Errasquin, of Basque origin. In 1886 the family moved to Barcelona, where his father had been transferred to run the Barcelona Tramways Company Limited. On the grounds near the Hippodrome of Can Tunis, their father taught his three sons Samuel, Enrique (Henry) and Júnior (Miguel) the practice of football, a sport which was then practically unknown in Barcelona.

== Playing career ==
=== Early career ===
Together with his brothers, Morris was one of the first pioneers in the amateur beginnings of football in Catalonia, and the three of them appeared in what is regarded to be the oldest photograph of a football team in Spain, which was the two sides of the then existing Barcelona Football Club, taken on 12 March 1893, with Miguel being only a 13-year-old boy at the time. Out of the 24 figures in that infamous photograph, he and the referee, Alfredo Collet, were the only ones who did not play in the match that took place that day. Although his name was Miguel, his family knew him as Junior (because he was the youngest sibling of the family), so the Barcelona press always presented him as either J. Morris or Morris III.

=== Hispania AC and FC Barcelona ===
In 1899, Morris moved to London with his father while his two older brothers stayed in Barcelona and began playing for Hispania AC. He returned to Barcelona in 1901, and joined Hispania AC where his brothers were already playing.

During their time in Hispania, the three Morris brothers joined the ranks of FC Barcelona on two occasions: the first on the occasion of the match against the officers of the British cruise ship HS Calliope on 23 November 1901, where they helped Barça to a 4–0 victory, and the second in May of 1902, when they reinforced Barça during its participation in the Copa de la Coronacion, the first national championship disputed in Spain and the forerunner for the Copa del Rey.

Miguel played alongside Enrique in the semifinals against Real Madrid CF (then known as Madrid FC), which was the very first El Clásico in history, and then all three of them played in the final, where Barça was beaten 2–1 by Club Vizcaya (a combination of players from Athletic Club and Bilbao Football Club). In doing so, they became the first-ever Filipinos to play for FC Barcelona, ahead of the likes of Manuel Amechazurra and Paulino Alcántara.

After this parenthesis with Barça, the Morris brothers continued to play at Hispania AC until 1903, when the club was dissolved for lack of players, but while Samuel retired due to his advanced age, Miguel and Enrique joined FC Barcelona permanently, playing for the club for two years until 1905, and helping them win the Catalan championship in 1904–05.

=== Later career ===
Between 1905 and 1908, Morris probably lived in Madrid since he only played with clubs from the capital, Moncloa FC and Sociedad Gimnástica. On his return to Barcelona, he played again with Barça and won the Catalan championship again in 1909. Despite this, he left again, this time to join Enrique at Star FC, whose captain was his brother. He then joined Català FC in 1912, playing with them for two seasons. In the following years, Morris also played for Canigó Sports Group and Canadiense FC before finally retiring.

=== International career ===
In 1903, Morris played three friendly matches between teams made up of the best players in Barcelona, the first at Muntaner on 17 May, the second just four days later on 21 May, and the third on 8 September, scoring once for the Reds in a 3–4 loss to the Whites.

On 17 January 1905, Morris earned his only cap for the Catalan national team in a match against the Sportsmen's Club at Espanyol's field, the Hospital Clínic, featuring in defense alongside Joaquim Carril as the match finished with an unknown score.

On 8 December 1912, Morris played for a Selection of foreigners who played in Spain (which had the likes of Jack Greenwell, Walter Rositzky, and Alex Steel) in an eventual 2–5 loss to the Catalan national team at the Camp de la Indústria, on the occasion of a benefit match for the Union of Journalists.

== Honours ==
FC Barcelona

- Copa de la Coronación:
  - Runner-up: 1902
- Catalan championship
  - Champions (2): 1904–05 and 1908–09
