= Royal Barcelona Maritime Club =

Coordinates: 41.375497°N 2.181888°E

- Burgee
- Short name: RCMB
- Founded: 1881
- Location: Barcelona, Catalonia, Spain
- Website: http://www.maritimbarcelona.org

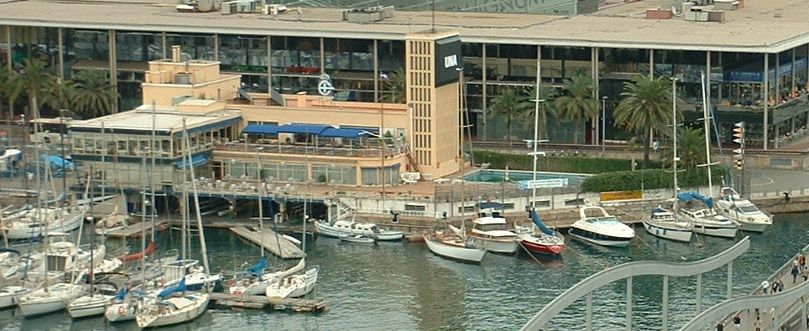
Reial Club Marítim de Barcelona

The Royal Barcelona Maritime Club (Catalan: Reial Club Marítim de Barcelona (RCMB), Spanish: Real Club Marítimo de Barcelona) is a member-only yacht club based in Barcelona. It was established in 1881 and is one of the oldest yacht clubs in Catalonia, Spain.

This club is located at one end of Barcelona harbor, close to where la Rambla meets the sea, by the "Maremagnum" shopping mall and aquarium complex. The RCMB is a well-equipped yacht club, with its own delimited area situated very close to its rival Royal Barcelona Yacht Club (Reial Club Nàutic de Barcelona), which is considered more elitist. The RCMB's area is an "administrative concession" from the Barcelona Port Authority. It houses the club's premises, where there is a cafeteria cum restaurant specialized in fish dishes.

The club has 251 moorings for yachts of average size. On its NE side there is a dry dock area and repair facilities for both sail and motor boats. The club also offers sailing courses and watersports courses.

The Royal Barcelona Maritime Club regularly organizes regattas. It has participated in many sailing competitions and has won more than 1.000 medals in domestic competitions, as well as over 200 medals in international competitions. It won also the first olympic medal for Spain in the 1932 Olympics.
