= Hippodrome of Can Tunis =

Sports venue in Barcelona (1883–1934)

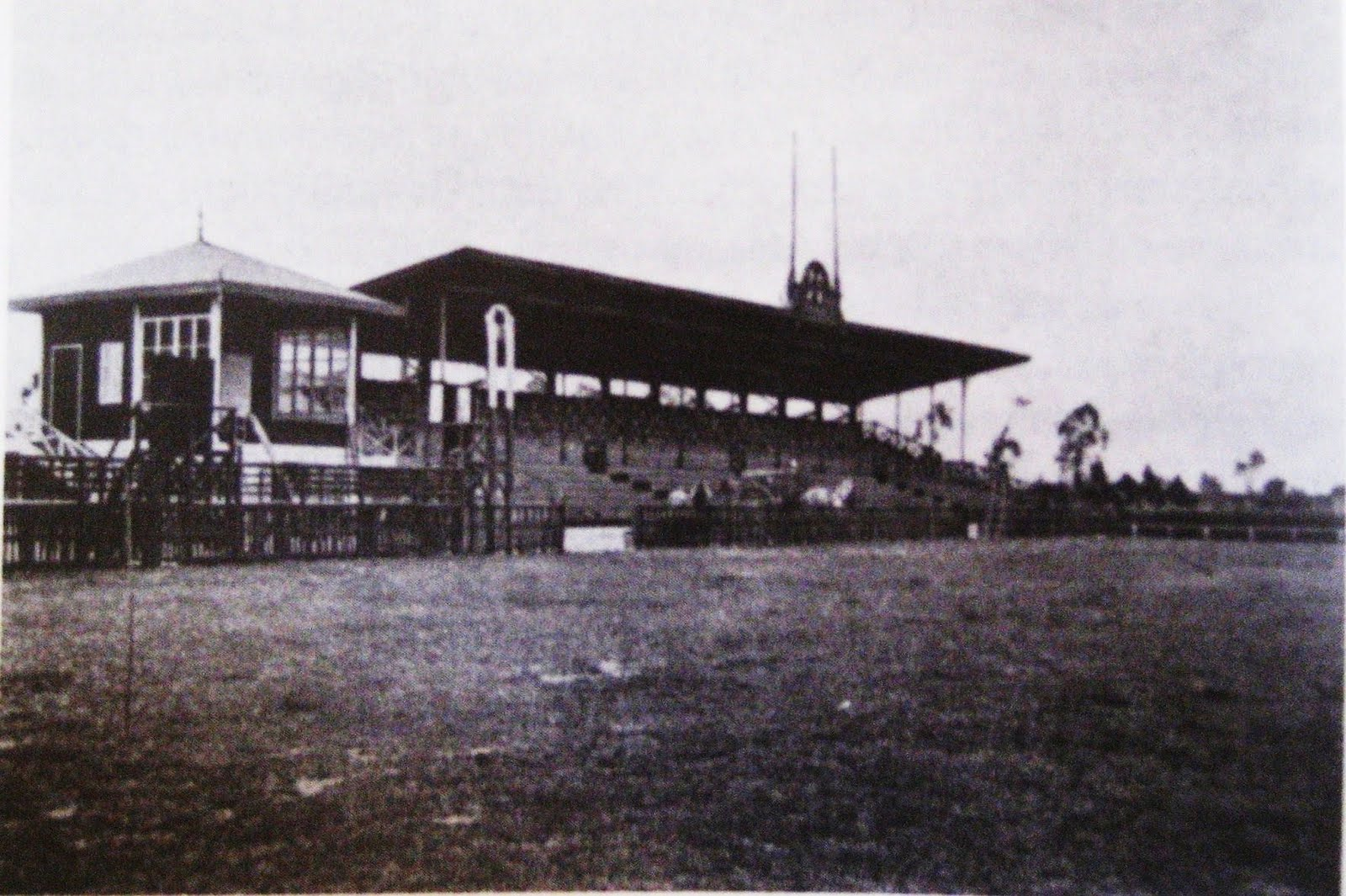
- Hippodrome of Can Tunis
- Location: Can Tunis, Catalonia, Spain

Construction
- Opened: 23 September 1883
- Demolished: 1934
- Cost: 30.000 pesetas

Tenants
- Barcelona Football Club (1892–1894) Club Español (1901–1910) FC Barcelona

The Hippodrome of Can Tunis was a sports venue in the city of Barcelona, Spain. Originally an equestrian venue, it's now best remembered as a historic football and aeronautic venue. The Hippodrome of Can Tunis played a pivotal role in the early steps of football in Catalonia as one of the first football fields in Barcelona, and then served as a practice ground for the city’s budding aviation sector, and where the first plane to fly across Spain took off from on 12 February 1910.

== History ==
=== Early success ===
It was inaugurated by Francesc Rius i Taulet, then mayor of Barcelona, on 23 September 1883, with the sponsorship of the Barcelona Equestrian Club and the Foment de la Cria Cavallina. The grand opening of the Hippodrome happened on the occasion of the patron saint festivities of La Mercè, and it was attended by 3000 people and 300 carriages, being one of the social events of the year. It was located on a dried-up piece of land of the old lake of the port of Barcelona, with dimensions of 9 hectares and a capacity of up to 2,500 spectators. Getting to the racetrack was no easy task. On the Camí del Morrot, stones fell from the Montjuïc mountain and it was dangerous. The residents of the area lived it as a major holiday. They filled up the streets and children waited for the carriages to pull up so that visitors to the hippodrome could give them candy.

The track was 300 meters long by 16 wide, while the tribune was designed for about a thousand spectators with a rigorous hierarchical order in the occupation of spaces depending on the social position of the spectator; there was also a central lawn to which the public could access. The venue also had gardens, paintings, a kiosk for the orchestra, stables for 32 horses (at the inauguration, it was later expanded), offices, a restaurant, and a recreational area. The Hippodrome soon became a meeting point for the wealthy classes of the city.

=== Football ===
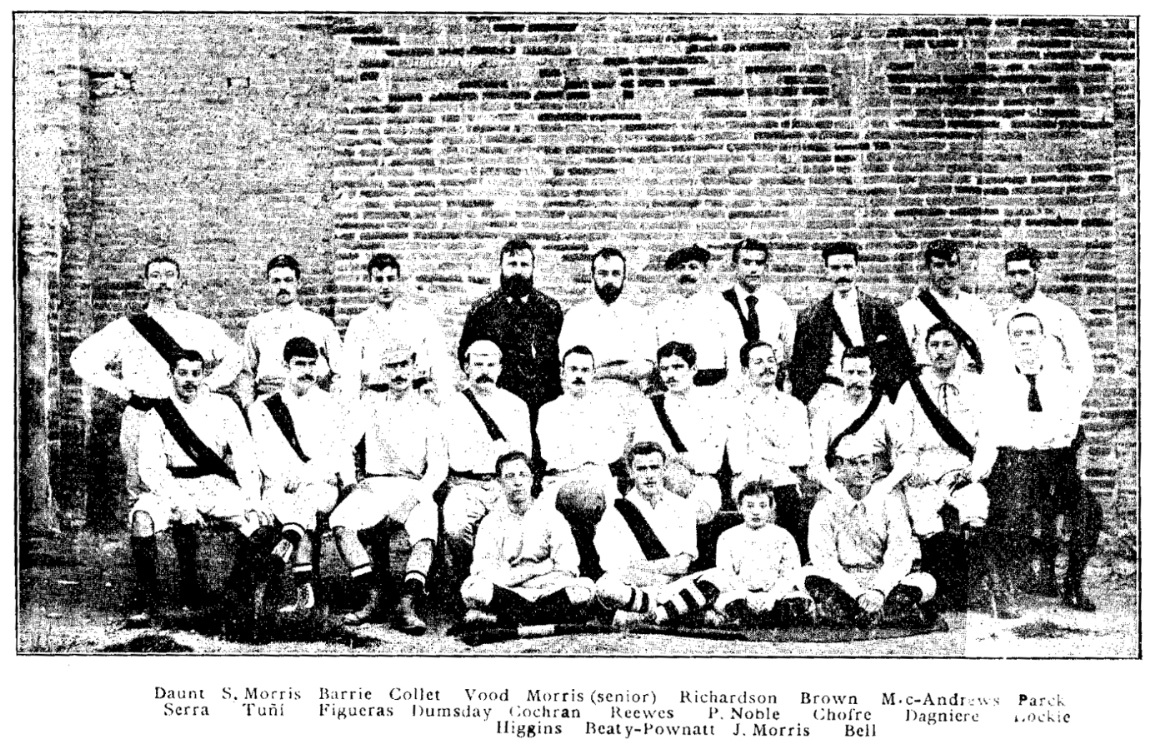
Two football teams (blue and red) before a match at Can Tunis on 12 March 1893. Its widely regarded as the oldest photo of a Spanish football team.

It was near the grounds of Can Tunis where the infamous Morris brothers, Samuel, Enrique (Henry) and Miguel, were taught the practice of football by their father, a sport which was then practically unknown in the city. In the early 1890s, the three Morris's brothers, together with the likes of James Reeves and Alberto Serra, took part in some of the first football matches organized in Barcelona, which were held near the grounds of the Hippodrome of Can Tunis and even on the racetrack itself. The Hippodrome hosted the first known football match in the city on 25 December 1892, and also hosted the first match properly chronicled in Catalonia, which was played by 22 players from the British Colony of Barcelona and of the Club Regatas de Barcelona divided into two teams: one dressed in blue and the other one in red, ending in a 2–1 win for the blues. The Hippodrome soon became the home of football in the city, however, in 1894, this group of football pioneers began to look for a place of easier access to the city center, thus moving to Velódromo de la Bonanova, who hosted their first football match on 27 January 1895.

In addition to football, the venue was also a practice ground for the city’s budding aviation sector, an airport and a center for aeronautical shows, such as the first airplane flight across Spain, which took place on 12 February 1910. Julien Mamet was in charge of carrying it out, taking off on board a Blériot XI with a 25 HP engine made from scrap metal, paper and wood.

=== Decline and Collapse ===
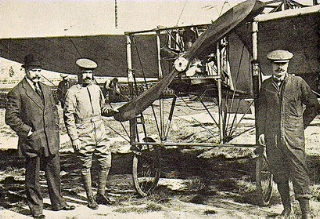
First airplane flight in Spain (1910), by French pilot Julien Mamet.

The hippodrome was an emblem of the bourgeoisie and the aristocracy of Barcelona at the end of the 19th century, from its opening in 1883 to 1896, developing steadily as it was very popular, especially among the wealthier classes, but with the arrival of the century, the show began to decline, which for a few years caused its owners to negotiate the rental of the facilities to various football teams, such as FC Barcelona and Club Español, who took their first steps there. With the proclamation of the Second Spanish Republic on 14 April 1931, gambling was banned. This caused the hippodrome to lose visitors until it closed for good in 1934.
