= Torelló =

- Municipality
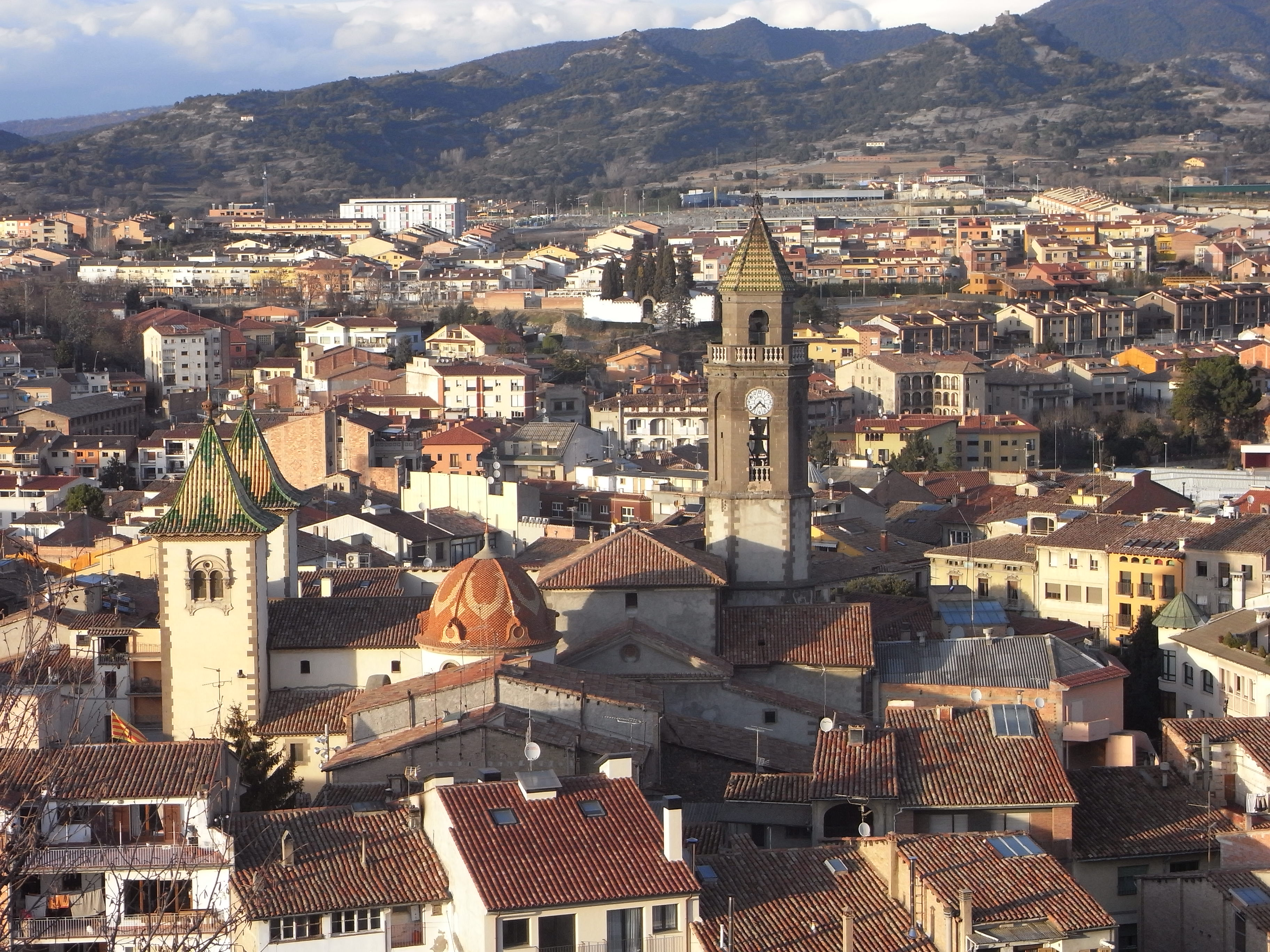
- Torelló

- Coat of arms

- Location in Catalonia
- Coordinates: 42.0495°N 2.265°E
- Country: Spain
- Community: Catalonia
- Province: Barcelona
- Comarca: Osona

Government
  - Mayor: Santi Vivet Soler (2015) (CIU)

Area
  - Total: 13.5 km^{2} (5.2 sq mi)
- Elevation: 869 m (2,851 ft)

Population (2025-01-01)
  - Total: 15,334
  - Density: 1,140/km^{2} (2,940/sq mi)
- Postal code: 08570
- Website: ajtorello.cat

Torelló (Catalan pronunciation: [tuɾəˈʎo], locally [tuɾəˈjo]) is a Spanish municipality in the comarca of Osona, in the Province of Barcelona, Catalonia. As of 2009 its population was 13,808.

== Geography ==
The town is located at the confluence of the Ter and Ges Rivers. It is the main town of the Ges valley (Vall del Ges).
