= Football in the Basque Country =

Soccer in a Spanish autonomous community

Location map of professional football clubs in the Greater Basque Country

Association football has been a part of the culture of Basque Country, and its surrounding region, since the end of the 19th century, and is its most popular sport, both in terms of participants and spectators. As of 2025, four Basque teams play in La Liga, the top division of the Spanish football system: Athletic Bilbao, Real Sociedad, CA Osasuna and Deportivo Alavés.

== History ==
=== Early years ===
Modern football was introduced to the Basque Country in the late 19th century by a combination of mostly British immigrant workers, visiting sailors and Spanish students returning from Britain. In the late 1870s, various English workers scattered throughout the peninsula began to establish informal groups that were dedicated to different recreational practices, especially cricket and football, particularly in Spanish ports, such as the ones in Vigo, Andalusia, (Huelva and Seville) and Bilbao, who were the regions that most felt this phenomenon. The latter was a leading port of an important industrial area with iron mines and shipyards nearby. Likewise, it was the British employees of the Nervión Shipyards, located in Sestao (Vizcaya), who organized and played the first known football match in the region, which was held on 4 April 1890, between the Machinery Department (engineers) and the Shipyard Workers, ending in an 8–1 to the former. This group of football pioneers were part of a multi-sports club called Club Atleta, which had been founded in late 1889.

These first football meetings were held on the quay next to the riverbank of Nervión, also known as La Campa de los Ingleses, and it was on this field that Club Atleta began to play against crews of English ships coming from Portsmouth and Southampton, and even a new team, the Bilbao Football Club, which was also made up of British residents in the region, but not linked to the shipyards, such as Alfred Mills, who was a telegraph operator. By 1892 the sheer quantity of Englishmen playing football on La Campa de los Ingleses forced them to seek another pitch that could properly accommodate the growing population of Brits, and so, in November 1892, the president of Club Atleta, Enrique Jones Bird, asked for permission to play in the Hippodrome of Lamiako. Permission was duly granted and the racetrack became the new home of organized football in Viscaya. It was from Lamiako that the sport of football took off in Bilbao, with several Bilbainos swarming the field to watch the teams of British workers challenge each other every weekend, and there is even evidence of a "serious" tournament in the winter of 1892–93, which was contested in Lamiako by Club Atleta and Bilbao FC, and won by the former, who received medals presented by James S. Clark on 22 April 1893.

Interest in the sport continued to grow among the local citizens, who began to practice it, and they even went as far as to challenge the British workers in 1894 to a match at Lamiako, and naturally, the much advanced British won by a resounding score (0–5), but the result did not discourage the local population who were quick to play another match as the sport was sparking high interest in the area. Likewise, between 1894 and 1895, the Lamiako facilities experienced spectacular growth in terms of meetings, which were usually contested on Sunday mornings by the British, but increasingly against the locals as well. In 1896, a group of young Bilbainos from the upper class, who had learned about football while studying in England, began playing football informally in the sandy areas where the Paseo de Zugazarte stands today, and two of them, Carlos Castellanos, who is said to have been the first Spaniard to bring a ball and boots to the Iberian Peninsula, and his brother Manuel, realized the convenience of becoming a club. With the disappearance of the Bilbao FC that existed in 1892–93, the most logical name for a new football club founded in Bilbao (Bilbao Football Club) was now available again, so they took it. Among them were the Arana brothers (José Antonio and Luis) Santiago Martínez de las Rivas, the son of José María Martínez de las Rivas, the owner of the Nervión Shipyards.

In 1898, Juan Astorquia, a former Bilbao FC member, became the figurehead of a seven-man committee made-up of Lamiako usuals and football enthusiasts belonging to the Gimnásio Zamacois, and this group formed what would later become Athletic Club, which unlike Bilbao FC, was almost entirely made of players from Biscay. Between 1898 and 1900, Bilbao FC and Athletic Club played several matches outside of journalistic attention until the former, as both the oldest club and the club with the best organization and clairvoyance when it comes to complying with the Law, became the first to regularize its situation when it was officially established on 30 November 1900, in an informal meeting held in the house of industrialist José Luis de Villabaso in the Biscayan neighborhood of Algorta. Its regulations were approved by the civil governor and printed in 1901.

A few months later, in February 1901, Athletic Club, probably encouraged by the first news about the founding of Bilbao FC, began conversations to officially establish the club, which they did on 5 September 1901, in the infamous meeting held in the Café García, in which the 33 members decided to make it official and register as a sports organization with the local council. While Athletic Club was mainly formed by local players, having only one foreigner in its ranks, Alfred Mills, Bilbao FC was mostly made up by foreigners, such as Walter Evans, George Langford, William Dyer, and George Cochran. At the end of 1901, the two most important clubs in the city were Athletic Club and Bilbao FC, so they inevitably developed a rivalry between them, playing several friendly matches at Lamiako, which the two teams shared since there were hardly any fields in Bilbao. Their duels aroused great expectation and served as one of the drivers of football as a mass phenomenon in Bilbao. In 1902, the two rivals agreed to join the best players of each club to play two games against the Bordeaux-based side Burdigala, beating them 0–2 in France, the first time a Bilbao team played on foreign territory, and 7–0 in Lamiako, the very first visit by a foreign team to Bilbao, gathering a crowd of three thousand spectators, a tremendous amount at the time.

This temporary merge became known as Club Bizcaya (with a B), and following an invitation from Madrid FC (now known as Real Madrid), Club Bizcaya was sent to Madrid to represent the city of Bilbao in the 1902 Copa de la Coronación, with the then Athletic president, Juan Astorquia, being named the team's captain. This entity played and won three games on consecutive days, and then the title after beating the Catalan club, FC Barcelona, in the final, by a score of 2 goals to 1, netted by Astorquia and Raymond Cazeaux, both of Athletic. In March 1903, Bilbao FC could not keep an independent structure and ended up being absorbed by Athletic Club and the side that emerged from the unification was called Athletic Club de Bilbao. The club then won back-to-back Copa del Rey titles in 1903 and 1904, beating Madrid FC in the former (3–2) and winning the latter without playing a single match. Between 1901 and 1903, Astorquia was simultaneously Athletic's founder, player, captain (equivalent to coach), and president, performing all four tasks expertly.

In addition to Athletic and Bilbao FC, more teams were founded such as San Sebastián Recreation Club in 1903, the first club in San Sebastián, followed by Vasconia and Real Sociedad, and Irun FC in 1906, who later changed its name to Irún Sporting Club. An internal division split the team in 1908 and Racing Club Irún appeared. This local rivalry was very strong in such a small town, but the success of these teams was important. Both clubs merged later in 1915. Another important club that deserves a mention is Arenas FC (later Arenas de Getxo), founded in 1909 and located in Bizcaia, thus being the main threat for Athletic Club in the 1910s.

With the game becoming increasingly popular, the indigenous game of Basque pelota would soon come under threat, so much so that the Atotxa Stadium in San Sebastián forced nearby pelota courts to be demolished in order to make way for renovations, or more specifically, increase the capacity to 20,000. Alongside the development of football was the introduction of Basque nationalism by Sabino Arana, considered by some as the founding "father". Arana was involved in the creation of the flag, anthem, and ultimately the Basque Nationalist Party (Partido Nacionalista Vasco, PNV). Football and Basque nationalism are closely knitted throughout history and would go through significant historical events such as the Spanish Civil War, and the creation of Francoist Spain. In the time after, Basque football was dragged through politics, with locals banned from showing autonomy, and the Basque Country national football team playing a few games during the 36-year dictatorship. As time went on, the Basque Football Federation would come into inception in 1988.

=== Recent years ===
In the early 21st century, Basque football is represented by many clubs old and new, some of them holding a strong presence in the Spanish top division La Liga, including Athletic Bilbao (who have played there on a constant basis since its formation in 1928 and been champions eight times, plus 23 Copa del Rey wins and two UEFA Cup / Europa League finals), Real Sociedad (present in all but a handful of seasons, champions twice and Copa winners three times, including 2020 which was a Basque derby between Athletic and Real), Deportivo Alavés (somewhat intermittent members of the top division but with strong periods and a UEFA Cup final appearance in 2001) and SD Eibar (from 2014 to 2021, characterised as one of the smallest clubs to take part at that level).

== Basque Country national team ==
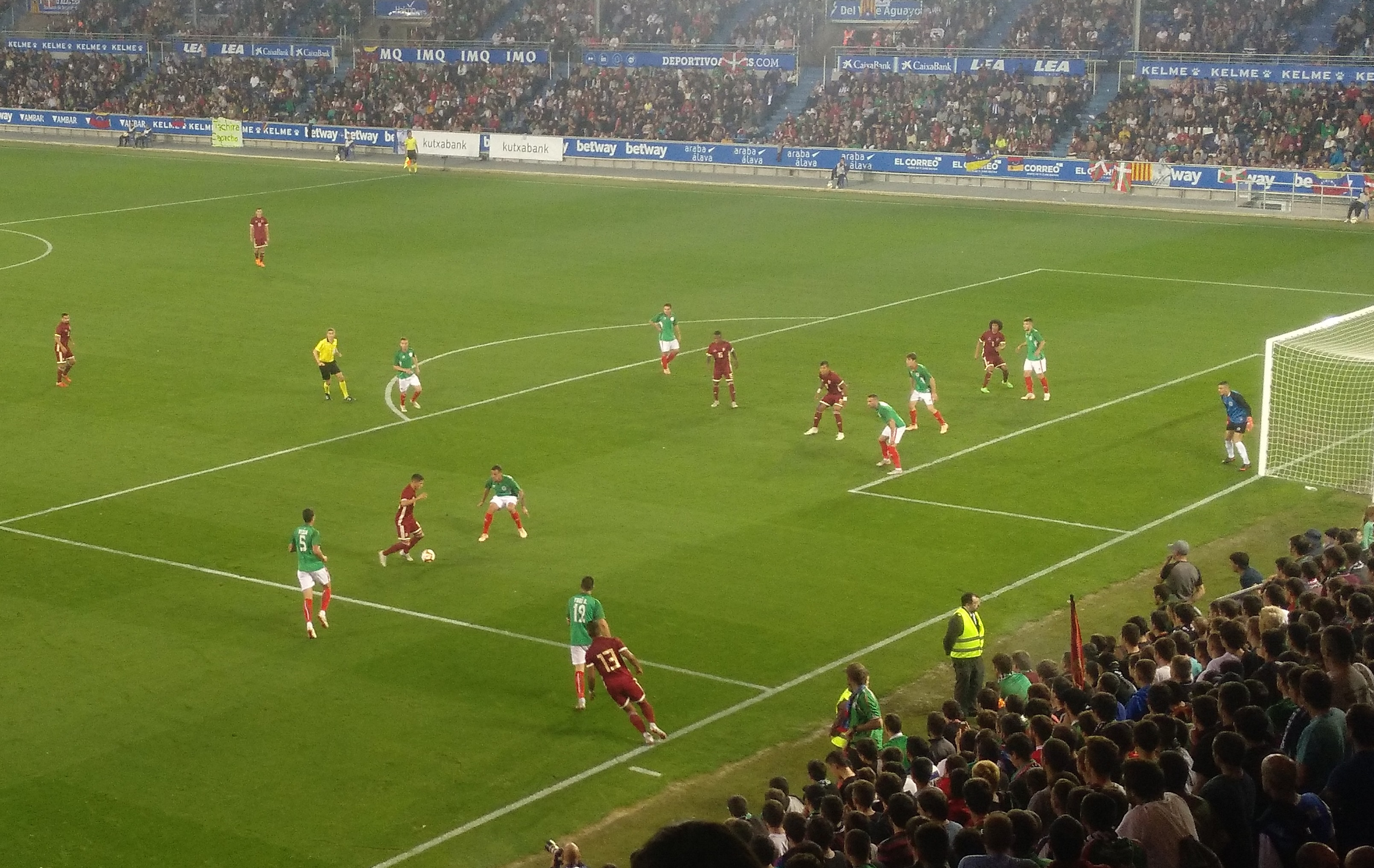
Basque Country national team (green, white, red kit) vs Venezuela in Gasteiz

The Basque Country national football team (Euskal selekzioa) selects players from the Greater Basque region comprising the Basque Autonomous Community (Biscay, Álava and Gipuzkoa) plus neighbouring Navarre – the historical home of the Basque people but in modern times has a distinct identity which is only partly Basque, and home to CA Osasuna at club level – within Spain, and the three small provinces making up the Northern Basque Country in France, a territory where rugby union is very popular but has produced some talented players. The representative team is run by the Basque Football Federation. Since its inception in 1930, the team went through a series of names, was organised under exile in Latin America with some of the region's leading players of the time during the Civil War, and only played twice under Franco's dictatorship. After his death in 1975, The team was up and running again, playing 26 friendly games so far against countries from around the world associated with FIFA – however they themselves are not connected to FIFA.

== Youth football ==
Youth football in the region (overseen by both the Basque Federation) has its own traditions and advanced style of play. Many youth teams are taught to play with possession-based style and quick thinking. Another unique aspect in the region is the emphasis that is placed on producing local talent, with Real Sociedad and Athletic Bilbao assessed as consistently using the highest proportion of homegrown players across the top European football leagues in the 2010s. Most of Real's players are Gipuzkoa locals from their academy, while Athletic's 100-year-old official signing policy limits themselves to players from the Greater Basque region (either born there, raised there i.e. received coaching at a local club including their own youth academy, or occasionally due to family ties, although they have never signed an established professional player on this more tenuous basis). Athletic Bilbao are highly regarded due to their ability to compete against the biggest teams like Real Madrid, Atlético Madrid, and FC Barcelona over several decades despite this restriction and commitment to local young players. With the Basque representative team organised on only an occasional, unofficial basis, the region has provided a long list of players for Spain throughout its history, particularly in the early decades of the 20th century when a high proportion of the top players across the whole league were Basque due to the sport's popularity in the region, but also in subsequent periods due to the focus on homegrown talent by the major clubs (although this is true to a certain extent across Spain, with all the leading teams using a long-established cantera system of youth development).

== Clubs ==
=== Active men's non-reserve clubs ===
Club	Stadium	Capacity	Founded	League
CA Osasuna	El Sadar Stadium	23,516	24 October 1920	La Liga
CD Tudelano	Ciudad de Tudela Stadium	11,000	29 November 1935	Segunda Federación
CD Izarra	Merkatondoa	3,500	6 January 1924	
Deportivo Alavés	Mendizorrotza Stadium	19,840	23 January 1921	La Liga
SD Amorebieta	Urritxe	3,000	4 January 1925	Segunda Federación
Amurrio Club	Estadio Basarte	4,000	1949	
CD Anaitasuna	Campo Txerloia	1,500	1944	
Añorga KKE	Campo de Rezola		1922	
Antiguoko	Campo de Berio		1982	
Apurtuarte Club	Campo de Futbol Arteaga		1926	
Arenas Club de Getxo	Campo Municipal de Gobela	2,000	1909	Primera Federación
UD Aretxabaleta	Estadio Ibarra	500	1946	
CD Ariznabarra	Campo Municipal de Ariznabarra		1972	
Athletic Bilbao (a.k.a. Athletic Club)	San Mamés	53,289	1898	La Liga
CD Aurrerá Ondarroa	Zaldupe	1,000	1921	
CD Aurrerá de Vitoria	Estadio Olaranbe	4,000	1935	
SD Balmaseda FC	La Baluga	1,500	2 August 1914	
Barakaldo CF	Estadio de Lasesarre	7,960	1917	Primera Federación
CD Basconia	Estadio de Lopez Cortazar	8,500	1 January 1913	Segunda Federación
SD Beasain	Estadio Loinaz	6,000	1905	
Bermeo FT	Estadio Municipal Itxas Gane	3,000	1950	
Danok Bat CF	Estadio Mallona		1972	
SD Deusto	Campo de Futbol de Etxezuri	1,000	1913	
SCD Durango	Estadio Tabira	3,000	1919	
SD Eibar	Ipurua Municipal Stadium	8,164	30 November 1940	Segunda División
CD Elgoibar	Mintxeta	4,000	1917	
SD Erandio Club	Nuevo Ategorri	2,500	1915	
Gernika Club	Estadio Urbieta	3,000	1922	Segunda Federación
CD Getxo	Campo Municipal de Fadura	3,500	1927	
SD Indautxu	Campo Iparralde		1924	
CD Lagun Onak	Estadio Garmendipe	1,500	1944	
CD Laudio	Estadio Ellakuri	3,500	2002	
SD Leioa	Estadio Sarriena	3,741	1925	
Oiartzun KE	Karla Lekuona	2,000	1975	
Ordizia KE	Estadio Municipal de Altamira	2,000	1941	
SD Oyonesa	Estadio Luis Asarta	1,500	1928	
Pasaia KE	Campo de Futbol Don Bosco	2,000	1998	
Club Portugalete	Estadio la Florida	5,000	1944	
Real Sociedad	Anoeta Stadium	39,500	7 September 1909	La Liga
Real Unión	Stadium Gal	5,000	15 May 1915	Primera Federación
SD Retuerto Sport	Ibarreta	822	1923	
SD Salvatierra	Estadio Municipal de Salvatierra	1,000	1964	
Club San Ignacio	Adurtzabal	400	1964	
SD San Pedro	Estadio Las Llanas	8,000	1923	
CD Santurtzi	San Jorge	2,000	1952	
Santutxu FC	Estadio Mallona	4,000	1918	
Sestao River Club	Estadio Las Llanas	8,905	1996	Segunda Federación
Sodupe UC	Campo Lorenzo Hurtado de Saratxo	1,500	1947	
CD Sondika	Basozabal		1970	
Sporting Club de Lutxana	Serralta	1,995	1919	
Tolosa CF	Estadio Beratzubi	3,000	1922	
Touring KE	Campo de Futbol de Fanderia	1,000	1923	
Gurutzeta KFT	La Siebe	1,030	1980	
Union Sport San Vicente	Ciudad Deportiva San Vicente	1,200	1923	
CD Vitoria	Unbe Sports Complex	4,000	1945	
Zalla UC	Estadio Landaberri	3,500	1925	
Zamudio SD	Estadio Gazituaga	5,000	1943	
Zarautz KE	Estadio Asti	1,000	1944	
Aviron Bayonnais	Stade Didier Deschamps, Bayonne	3,500	1935	National 2
Les Genêts d'Anglet	Stade Saint-Jean		1910	National 3

=== Defunct clubs and reserve teams ===
Club	Stadium	founded	Dissolved	League
Deportivo Alavés C	José Luis Compañón	1980	2005	
Bizcaya		1902	1907	
Club Ciclista de San Sebastián	Ondarreta Stadium	1909	1909	
SD Eibar B	Unbe Sports complex	1994	2012	
SD Lemona	Estadio Arlonagusia	1923	2012	
Sestao Sport Club	Las Llanas	1916	1996	
Real Sociedad B (Real Sociedad de Fútbol "B"; Sanse)	Zubieta	1955	[reserve]	Segunda División
Athletic Bilbao B (Athletic Club "B"; Bilbao Athletic)	Lezama (Field 2)	1964	[reserve]	Primera Federación
CA Osasuna B (Club Atlético Osasuna B; Osasuna Promesas)	Tajonar	1962	[reserve]	Segunda Federación

== Honours ==
- Spain football champions (21)
- Copa del Rey (30)

== Stadiums ==
#	Image	Stadium	Capacity	City	County	Home team	Opened	UEFA rank
1		San Mamés	53,331	Bilbao	Basque Country	Athletic Bilbao	2013	4/4 stars
2		Anoeta	40,000	Donostia-San Sebastián	Basque Country	Real Sociedad	1993	4/4 stars
3		Mendizorrotza	19,840	Vitoria-Gasteiz	Basque Country	Deportivo Alavés	1924	
4		El Sadar	23,576	Pamplona	Navarre	C.A. Osasuna	1967	3/4 stars
5		Ciudad de Tudela	11,000	Tudela (Tutera)	Navarre	CD Tudelano	1969	

== Famous footballers from Basque Country ==
Basque footballers with 100 or more international caps

- Andoni Zubizarreta
- Irene Paredes
- Xabi Alonso
- Didier Deschamps

== See also ==
- Basque football derbies
- Category:Football in the Basque Country (autonomous community)
- List of Basque footballers
- Campeonato Regional Centro
- Divisiones Regionales de Fútbol in the Basque Country
- Divisiones Regionales de Fútbol in Navarre
- Basque Country national football team
- Basque Country women's national football team
- Basque Football Federation
- Navarre Football Federation
- Basque Derby
