= Manuel Ansoleaga =

Spanish footballer

Personal information
- Full name: Manuel Graciano Ansoleaga Aguirre
- Date of birth: 17 December 1879
- Place of birth: Getxo, Biscay, Spain
- Date of death: Unknown
- Place of death: Unknown
- Position: Midfielder

Senior career*
Years	Team	Apps	(Gls)
1901–1902	Bilbao FC		
1902–1904	Athletic Club	2	(0)

Managerial career
- 1915: Athletic Bilbao (assistant)
- 1921–1922: Atlético Madrid
Vice president of Atlético Madrid
Succeeded by	José García Cernuda
- * Club domestic league appearances and goals

Manuel Graciano Ansoleaga Aguirre (17 December 1879 – ?) was a Spanish footballer who played as a midfielder for Athletic Bilbao, with whom he won the 1903 and 1904 Copa del Rey titles. He later joined the ranks of Atlético Madrid, becoming the club's first-ever manager as well as a vice president in the early 1920s.

== Football career ==
=== Bilbao FC ===
In the late 1890s, Ansoleaga became a member of an informal group led by Carlos and Manuel Castellanos, the so-called Bilbao Football Club, the first entity to play football in Bilbao since the disappearance of Club Atleta. Although it was formed in 1896, it was not until 30 November 1900 that the Bilbao Football Club was officially established in a meeting held in the house of industrialist José Luis de Villabaso in the Biscayan neighborhood of Algorta.

At the end of 1901, the two most important clubs in the city were Bilbao FC and Athletic Club, so they began playing several friendly matches against each other at the Hippodrome of Lamiako, and Ansoleaga, along with his brother, a certain J. Ansoleaga, played in some of them, thus being part in what is now regarded as one of the first football rivalries in Spain, one that helped turn football into a mass phenomenon in Bilbao since their duels aroused great expectation.

Ansoleaga featured in the midfield alongside his brother in a match on 1 December 1901, which ended in a 1–1 draw, but then he missed the next match two weeks later, on 15 December, and since he was not replaced, Bilbao FC played with 10 players. Ansoleaga then played in the first paid match held in Biscay on 19 January 1902, in which Bilbao FC once again played with one less player than Athletic, but despite "playing a very hard game all afternoon, he was confident and tireless", as reported in the newspapers of the time. In this match, he started as a midfielder, but then in the second half, with the arrival of Lee, who was late, the goalkeeper Rogelio Renovales moved into midfield and Ansoleaga took over as goalkeeper, and as a result of this change, Bilbao FC began to push much more and they were rewarded with a goal from William Dyer, although they still ended up losing 2–4.

His next and last appearance for Bilbao FC came on 9 March 1902, which ended in an 0–1 loss to Athletic; in the chronicle of this match, his name was wrongly written as "Aureolaga".

=== Athletic Bilbao ===
In 1903, Bilbao FC collapsed and its remaining members were officially absorbed by Athletic Club, and even though Ansoleaga played only two competitive matches for Athletic between 1902 and 1904, he was part of the Athletic team that won the 1903 Copa del Rey, featuring in the final alongside the likes of Alejandro de la Sota, and club founders Juan Astorquia and Eduardo Montejo; He was at the heart of a 3–2 comeback win over Madrid FC (now known as Real Madrid) in the final. Ansoleaga was also part of the team for the 1904 Copa del Rey, which Athletic won without playing a single match since their opponents failed to turn up.

== Managerial career ==
In the mid-1910s, Ansoleaga became the assistant coach of Billy Barnes. In 1915, the club's management commissioned the Basque painter José Arrue a portrait of the team, which depicted the eleven players, wearing red and white jerseys and black pants, plus the coach Barnes and his "tireless" assistant, Manolo Ansoleaga. Ansoleaga later joined the ranks of Atlético Madrid, becoming the vice president of the club under the presidency of Julián Ruete until he was replaced by José García Cernuda in the 1922–23 season.

In 1921, the Atlético board asked Ansoleaga, the then vice-president of the club, to coach the team, thus becoming the first-ever documented coach in the club's history. He was at the helm of the club for just one season.
