= Enrique Careaga =

Spanish footballer and sports leader

Personal information
- Full name: Enrique Timoteo González de Careaga y Bishop
- Date of birth: 19 March 1872
- Place of birth: Bilbao, Spain
- Date of death: 8 May 1936 (aged 64)
- Place of death: Mexico
- Position: Defender

Senior career*
Years	Team	Apps	(Gls)
1901–1902	Bilbao FC		
1902	Bizcaya		
3rd President of Athletic Bilbao
In office 1903–1906
Preceded by	Juan Astorquia
Succeeded by	Ramón de Aras Jáuregui
3rd President of Real Sporting Club
In office 1902–1904
Preceded by	Pedro Laiseca
Succeeded by	Santiago Martínez de las Rivas
- * Club domestic league appearances and goals

Enrique Timoteo González de Careaga y Bishop (19 March 1872 – 5 May 1936) was a Spanish engineer and footballer who played as a defender for Club Bizcaya, with whom he won the 1902 Copa de la Coronación. He then served as the 3rd president of Athletic Bilbao between 1903 and 1906. Under his presidency, the club officially absorbed their city rivals, Bilbao FC, and won its first two Copa del Reys titles.

== Early life ==
Careaga's birth appears in the baptized books of the Church of San Nicolás, Bilbao, dated 19 March 1872, as the son of Miguel Joaquín González de Careaga (1830–?) and his second wife, Evelina Bishop Manley, a native of Mexico.

Being the son of a well-off family in Bilbao, Careaga was sent to Britain to complete his studies, where he developed a deep interest in football. When he returned to his hometown, and like many other Balbainos, he began to play football games in the Hippodrome of Lamiako, which at the time was the home of organized football in Biscay.

== Football career ==
=== Bilbao FC ===
In the late 1890s, Careaga became a member of an informal group led by Carlos and Manuel Castellanos, the so-called Bilbao Football Club, the first entity to play football in Bilbao since the disappearance of Club Atleta. Although it was formed in 1896, it was not until 30 November 1900 that the Bilbao Football Club was officially established in a meeting held in the house of industrialist José Luis de Villabaso (1852–1917) in the Biscayan neighborhood of Algorta.

At the end of 1901, the two most important clubs in the city were Bilbao FC and Athletic Club, thus developing a rivalry between them, as they played several friendlies at the Hippodrome of Lamiako, which the two teams shared since there were hardly any fields in Bilbao at the time, and Careaga played as a defender for Bilbao FC in two matches in December 1901, keeping a clean-sheet in the second to help his side to a 2–0 victory. Careaga was thus part in what is now regarded as one of the first football rivalries in Spain, one that helped turn football into a mass phenomenon in Bilbao since their duels aroused great expectation.

=== Club Bizcaya ===
In 1902, Bilbao FC and Athletic agreed to join the best players of each club to play two games against the Bordeaux-based side Burdigala. This temporary merge became known as Club Bizcaya, and Careaga played in the team's first-ever match on 9 March, helping his side to a 0–2 win in France, the first time a Bilbao team played on foreign territory. However, he did not play in the return fixture for unknown reasons and was replaced by Alfred Mills.

Together with Juan Astorquia, Armand Cazeaux and William Dyer, Careaga was part of the Club Bizcaya that participated in the 1902 Copa de la Coronacion, the first national championship disputed in Spain and the forerunner for the Copa del Rey. He only played in the final on 15 May, forming a defensive partnership with Athletic's Perico Larrañaga to help his side to a 2–1 victory over Joan Gamper's FC Barcelona. Interestingly, Careaga was late for the final, and fearing that he would not arrive in time for the match in the morning, Bizcaya managed to delay it to the afternoon by claiming that they had already played two games to Barcelona's one, and thus he was able to start the final.

His next and last appearance as a footballer came for Bilbao FC on 23 November 1902, which ended in an 0–1 loss to Athletic.

== Presidency of Athletic Bilbao ==
Astorquia used Bizcaya's successful campaign at the Copa de la Coronación to convince the owners of Bilbao FC, who had begun to lose interest in the club, of how beneficial and necessary it was to merge the two clubs. In order to further convince them of the merger, he promised to pass down the torch of the presidency to a Bilbao FC associate, and Careaga was the chosen one for this role, thus replacing Astorquia at the helm of the club to become its third president. Under his presidency, Athletic officially absorbed Bilbao FC on 24 March 1903. In the following month, on 8 April 1903, Athletic won its first-ever Copa del Rey title after beating Madrid FC in the final with a 3–2 comeback victory.

Despite winning their first title at the national level, the recent merger with the whites of Bilbao FC, and the promise of forming a thriving society, at the end of the year the club faced a sporting crisis as they found themselves without significant rivals in its territory. Between 1904 and 1905, Athletic barely played matches, and in fact, they managed to win the 1904 Copa del Rey without playing a single match since their opponents failed to turn up. Careaga held the presidency for three years until 1906, when he was replaced by Ramón de Aras Jáuregui.

== Real Sporting Club ==
In 1898, Careaga co-founded the Real Sporting Club of Bilbao, a sports club exclusively for men, and its first documented board was chaired by Careaga. In 1902, he was appointed as the club's third president, and after serving his biennial mandate, he was succeeded in 1904 by Santiago Martínez de las Rivas.

== Personal life ==
Careaga married María Josefina Pilar Catalina Urigüen y Mendiguren, and the couple had five children, Enrique, Alfonso, Josefina, José Miguel, and José María González de Careaga Urigüen. Alfonso went on to follow his footsteps by becoming a defender for Athletic Bilbao between 1925 and 1931, winning two leagues and two Copa del Rey titles. Coincidentally, his son formed a defensive partnership with the son of Manuel Castellanos.

== Death ==
Careaga died in Mexico on 5 May 1936, at the age of 64.
