= Martínez de las Rivas =

Martínez de las Rivas is a Spanish surname. Notable people with the surname include:

- José María Martínez de las Rivas (1848–1913), Spanish pioneer businessman in the industrialization of Biscay
  - Santiago Martínez de las Rivas (1877–1906), Spanish sportsman and son of the above
    - José María Olabarría Martínez de las Rivas, Spanish politician, sports leader, and grandson of José María
- Toby Martinez de las Rivas, British poet
