= Real Club Marítimo del Abra and Real Sporting Club =

Yacht club in Getxo, Spain

- Burgee
- Short name: RCMA – RSC
- Founded: 1972 (merger)
- Location: Getxo, Spain
- Website: http://www.rcmarsc.es/ www.rcmarsc.es

An alternate burgee

The Real Club Marítimo del Abra y Real Sporting Club is a yacht club located in Getxo, Biscay, Spain. It is one of the most important clubs in Spain, along with the rest of the members of the Spanish Association of Nautical Clubs (AECN), to which it belongs.

The club is the result of the union carried out in 1972 between the Real Sporting Club, founded in Bilbao in 1898, and Real Club Marítimo del Abra, founded in 1902. The former was one of the founders of Royal Spanish Sailing Federation and was involved in the drawing up of the first Racing Regulations in Spain.

== Background ==
The merchants or fishermen of Biscay had to risk their lives in the Cantabrian Sea for centuries. During the Industrial Revolution, navigation developed into a recreational sport and became a leisure activity. In the 1880s, amateurs were already renting a house in Zorroza, where they exercised in yawls and perissoir (small canoes), and this original group of rowing and sailing fans was the one who founded the Sporting Club of Bilbao a few years later.

== Origins ==
=== Real Sporting Club ===
The Real Sporting Club de Bilbao was founded in 1898 in the neighborhood of Zorroza, next to the Bilbao estuary and at the end of the capital of Vizcaya since the annexation of Abando, in a house jointly owned by the Ybarra-Revilla brothers and the Briñas family. It was founded as a mix of a sports club and a social club exclusively for men (women could only enter at the annual gala dinner). Its first documented board was chaired by Enrique Careaga, with vice president José de Zayas and members Eduardo Ubao, José Amann, Jaime Selby, and Ramón Real de Asúa, with Manuel Elorduy as secretary. The club had its headquarters in a punt, built in the Nervión Shipyards, 25 meters long by 10 meters wide and approximately 1 meter deep, to which 9 more meters in length were added in 1909, which was located in Portugalete, in the Abra, every summer, while in the winter, the club stayed at Axpe (Erandio). In the winter of 1981, this historic headquarters went under.

In 1900, Sporting and other clubs formed the Federation of Cantabrian Clubs, the seed of the current Royal Spanish Sailing Federation, which promoted a Copa del Cantábrico, whose Regattas were regulated in that same year and were run for the first time in 1901. Also in 1901, the club obtained the title of "Real" from Alfonso XIII, who thus became the club's honorary president. Sporting soon organized regattas of yachts and sloops, including the oldest regatta in the country, the Copa Gitana, bringing its members to the nautical competitions of San Sebastián, Santander, Bayonne, and Kiel. They went to the latter at the suggestion of Alfonso XIII, when he was named honorary president of the club, once his new floating house was installed next to the iron dock of Portugalete. The King's annual attendance at the week of regattas organized by Sporting came to turn Bilbao into a Cowes or Kiel, whose regattas were so lovingly attended by Edward VII of England and Wilhelm II of Germany.

In 1905, Alfonso XIII granted them the privilege of having their own uniform, el pico, a copy of the Navy's dress uniform, transformed with gold buttons from the Spanish Navy. In that same year, the club organized the first Copa del Rey de vela in honor of Alfonso XIII, a competition that since 1982 has been organized by the Real Club Náutico de Palma. In the summer of 1908, Alfonso XIII, arrived in Bilbao on board the Giralda on 15 August, and he was met by the flotilla of sloops of Sporting, which was then chaired by José Antonio de Arana, and the steamer Elcano with the representatives of the Cortes, Tomas Zubiría Ybarra, Juan Tomás Gandarias, and the local authorities. During his stay in Biscay, the King participated in the sloop regattas, also celebrating the cruise to Castro Urdiales, which was won by the German Wertheim with the sloop Ilse II, while the regatta of Copa del Cantábrico was won by Sogalinda, owned by the Conde de Zubiría. In 1934 it was decided to change Sporting's summer mooring point from Portugalete to Las Arenas.

In addition to being a recreational club, essentially focused on nautical activities, it was a center directly linked to Biscayan conservatism. In the ranks of Sporting were not only conservative deputies, senators, and councillors, such as Federico Echevarría, Benigno Chávarri, and José Maria Martínez de las Rivas, but also counts or marquises, many of them titled by Alfonso XIII, such as Eduardo Aznar. Other honorary members of the club in 1902 included Gandarias, Evaristo Churruca, and Ramon de la Sota. Some of the club's actual members in 1902 were two future Mayor of Bilbao Federico Moyúa (no. 1) and Gregorio Balparda (no. 6), the Arteche brothers (Julio and Antonio) (no. 25/6), and the son of José Maria, Santiago Martínez de las Rivas (no. 3). Santiago and Sota are also among the founding members of Marítimo del Abra.

=== Real Club Marítimo del Abra ===
The Real Club Marítimo del Abra was founded in 1902 by a group of young sportsmen from the city's high society. In 1910, Marítimo del Abra held a regatta jointly with Sporting, initialing this cooperation in 1921 with the creation of the Abra Cup.

Interestingly, at the beginning of the 20th century, several founding members of both Bilbao FC and Athletic Club, the first two football clubs in the city, appear in the membership lists of the Real Sporting Club and the Club Marítimo del Abra. In the 1902 list of Sporting Club, for instance, there are the Arana brothers (Luis, José Antonio, and Darío), the Castellanos brothers (Manuel and Carlos) (no. 84/5), Ricardo Ugalde (no. 12), Perico Larrañaga (no. 33), José María Amann (no. 58), the future Athletic presidents Juan Astorquia (no. 120) and Enrique Careaga (no. 21) and his brother Eduardo (no. 28), and even Enrique Allende (no. 19), who went on to became the first president of Atlético Madrid, which at the time was a branch of Athletic Bilbao. Among the founding members of Marítimo del Abra were Amado Arana (no. 116), Rogelio Renovales (no. 72), José María Alday (no. 21), Walter Evans (no. 202), former Athletic president Luis Márquez (no. 62), and future Athletic presidents Ramón de Aras Jáuregui (no. 239), Pedro de Astigarraga (no. 17), and Alejandro de la Sota (no. 75). Manuel Castellanos and Astorquia were also among the founding members of Marítimo del Abra. Notably, founding member no. 388 José Urízar Roales was the son of Luciano Urízar.

At the end of July 1902, the Marítimo had its first presentation ceremony, with the appointment of a board of directors made up of Ramón de la Sota (president), Ramón Hurtado (vice president), Ramón Coste (treasurer), Isidoro Larrínaga (accountant), José Luis de la Gándara (secretary), Horacio Echevarrieta, Joaquín de la Rica, Miguel Ferrer, Hermenegildo Lozano, and Pedro Olavarrieta (vocals). Marítimo had its headquarters in one of the first buildings built in Las Arenas, such as the establishment of Baños de Mar Bilbaínos. First, they rented and then bought part of the premises of the old spa where not only did nautical activities take place, but the families of the members, wives, and children, could access it as a space for "recreation and entertainment typical of their class". For this reason, for example, all political demonstrations were strictly prohibited, "as well as all kinds of discussions about religion and politics".

On 25 September 1906, in the presence of Alfonso XIII and before a great crowd, Bilbao-educated engineer Leonardo Torres Quevedo successfully demonstrated a radio-based control system named the Telekino, guiding the boat Vizcaya from the yacht club with people on board, demonstrating a standoff range of 2 km.

== History ==
In 1936, during the Spanish Civil War, Sporting was seized, first for a republican youth organization, and then as a submarine base. Just like Sporting, Marítimo was also seized during the civil war by the republican authorities, who took over its treasury and premises. The king and his visits were replaced by Francisco Franco, who visited the club during the Bilbao liberation festivities of 1939 and was named the new honorary president; however, the club's relations with Franco and his regime did not reach the familiarity of those maintained with Alfonso XIII. In 1941 Juan de Borbón was named honorary president, as his father had been. Sporting continued to maintain, without certainly showing any hostility to the Franco regime, a certain relationship with Bourbon monarchism. In fact, when Don Juan set foot on Spanish soil for the first time after his exile, landing from Giralda in Las Arenas in the summer of 1963, he headed to Sporting and then to Marítimo on 25 August 1963 and had lunch at the club the next day; Bourbon's journey, which should have continued in Gijón, did not have the opportunity to continue because he was not allowed to disembark.

Between 1939 and 1952, Sporting was called the Real Club de Regatas. In 1959, Sporting organized the first Spanish championship of the Dragon class.

== Lay out ==
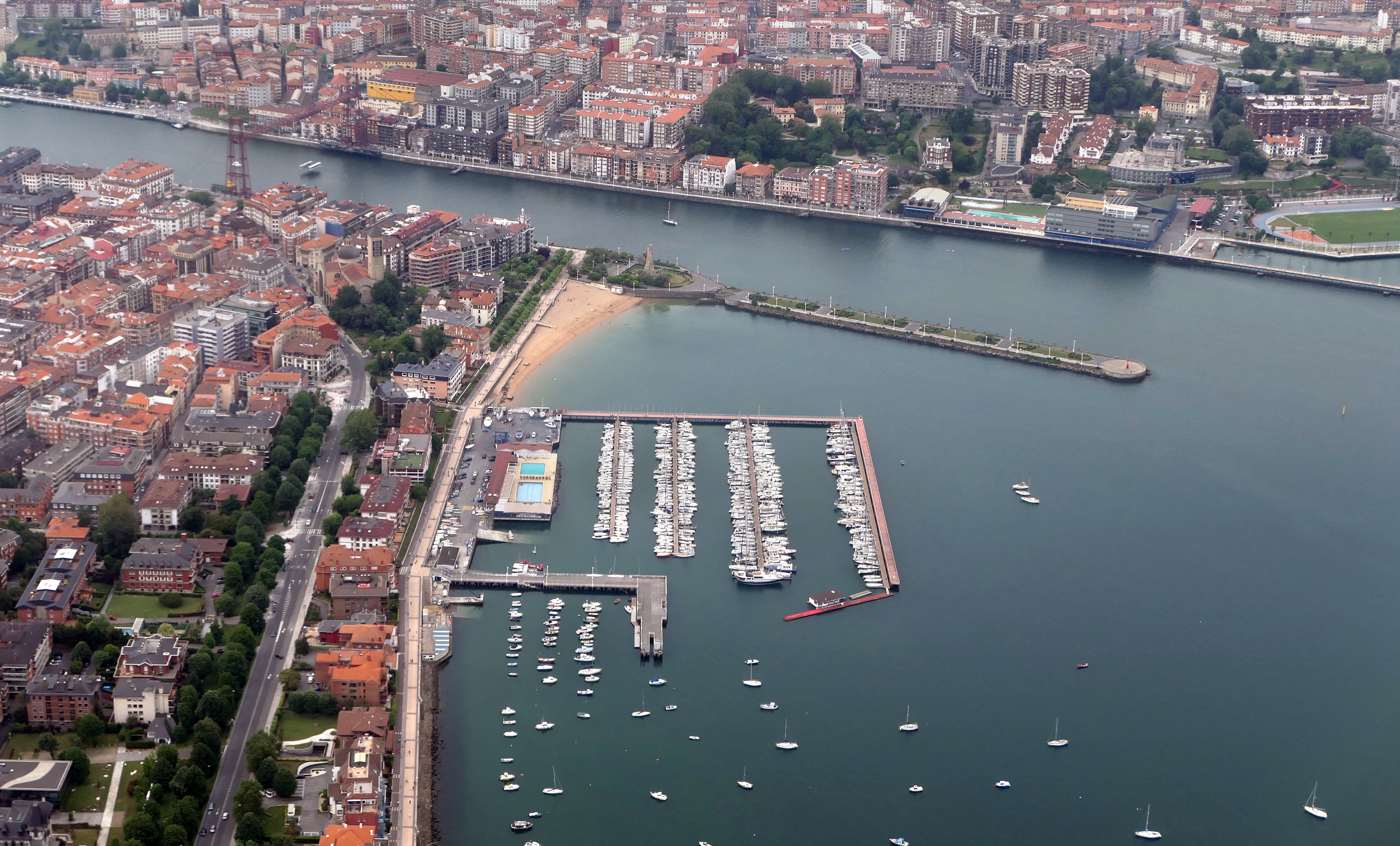
Aerial view

On 26 November 1973, its monumental and emblematic social building was completely destroyed by a terrorist action by ETA. The Club lost the building and its contents of paintings, trophies and memorabilia. Its current headquarters, which is located in the center of the Biscayan town of Las Arenas, next to the city center, was inaugurated in June 1976 and is the work of architects Eugenio Aguinaga and Iñigo Eulate when their project was chosen first prize in the competition held for this purpose. The building has two floors and a ground floor, with a total area of 5,000 m2, plus a bar, restaurant for 400 people, lounges, study Room and La Goleta nightclub. It also has a Padel court, sauna, gym, and heated indoor pool.

The Marina has 300 berths, for boats between 6 and 25 meters, equipped with water, electricity, and WiFi coverage. It has a travel lift, a fixed crane for small boats, a plank for stranded boats with a repair and cleaning service, a fuel supply, several nautical stores, and the Captain's Office building. In the Port area is located two seawater pools, which have a solarium, cafeteria-restaurant El Saltillo. Also within the port area are the Sailing School facilities.

The new headquarters has also suffered two more terrorist attacks by ETA, with the more recent one taking place in the early hours of 19 May 2008 when a bomb van with 60 kilos of explosives exploded next to the facilities of Marítimo del Abra as retaliation for Abra's selection as the club that would challenge for the Desafío Español in the next Copa del América. Until a month before, this representative club was the Real Club Náutico de Valencia, but when the Supreme Court of New York invalidated it as the first challenger, for being the closest thing to a ghost club (it had neither members nor moorings, nor registered office), the Desafío board decided to register for Náutico del Abra because Iberdrola, the tournament's main sponsor, had its headquarters in Bilbao, and also because it was the first, in alphabetical order, of the clubs that make up the Spanish association. According to the first analysis of the municipal architect, the club director Javier Chávarri stated that despite the great damage caused to the building, such as to the walls and furniture in the areas facing the sea on the ground floor and third floor, the structure of the club headquarters had not been damaged.

== Athletes ==
In 1957, sailor Juan Manuel Alonso-Allende, from Real Sporting, won the Snipe class world championship for Spain for the first time, with Gabriel Laiseca as a crew member, aboard the Guadalimar. Pedro José de Galíndez, Luis Arana and his son Javier de Arana, Álvaro de Arana, and José María de Arteche participated in the Olympics in 1928 in the 6 Meter class. Zulema Calvo and Mariana Buesa won the L'Equipe class European championship in 2003 and Manolo Rey-Baltar Abascal and Borja Reig the Snipe youth European championship in 2021.

== Presidents ==
Period	Presidents of Real Sporting Club
1898	Enrique Careaga
1898–1900	Santiago Martínez de las Rivas
1900–1902	Pedro Laiseca
1902–1904	Enrique Careaga
1904–1906	Santiago Martínez de las Rivas
1906–1908	Tomas Zubiría Ybarra
1908–1910	José Antonio de Arana
1910–1912	Alberto Aznar
1912–1914	Luis Arana
1914–1916	José Maria Chávarri
1916–1918	Fernando Ybarra
1918–1920	Víctor Chávarri
1920–1922	José Maria Gonzalez
1922–1924	Pedro de Astigarraga
1924–1926	Emilio Saracho
1926–1928	Pedro José de Galíndez
1928–1930	Ramón Coste
1930–1931	Fernando G. Ybarra
1931–1933	Eduardo de Astigarraga
1933–1936	Rafael Zubiría
1936–1940	Juan Caro Guillamas
1940–1942	Emilio Aznar
1942–1944	Pedro Careaga
1944–1946	Rafael Arteche
1946–1948	Manuel Zubiría
1948–1950	Juan Aguirre Achutegui
1950–1952	Ramón Real de Asúa
1952–1954	Juan Manuel Alonso-Allende
1954–1956	Juan Manuel Zubiría
1956–1958	Juan Manuel Alonso-Allende
1958–1960	Enrique Escudero
1960–1962	José Luis Azqueta
1962–1964	Manuel Olabarri
1964–1966	Ramón Zubiría
1966–1972	Ramón Churruca

Period	Presidents of Real Club Marítimo del Abra
1902–1904	Ramon de la Sota
1904–1906	Tomas Zubiría Ybarra
1906–1908	Alberto Aznar
1908–1910	Valentin Gorbeña
1910–1912	Restituto Goyoaga
1912–1914	José Maria Gonzalez
1914–1916	Víctor Chávarri
1916–1918	Tomas Urquijo
1918–1920	Julio de Arteche
1920–1924	Luis Arana
1924–1926	Rogelio Renovales
1926–1930	Pedro MacMahon
1930–1932	José Luis Gayoaga
1932–1934	Alfonso Churruca
1934–1937	Alvaro Garcia-Ogara
1937–1940	Francisco Ybarra
1940–1942	Pedro Careaga
1942–1944	Manuel Zubiría
1944–1946	Juan Aguirre Achutegui
1946–1948	Manuel Goyarrola
1948–1950	Enrique Lequerica
1950–1952	Luis Maria de Ybarra
1952–1954	Manuel Dias-Guardamino
1954–1956	Javier Ybarra
1956–1958	Estanislao Escauriaza
1958–1960	Fernando Ybarra
1960–1962	Alvaro Delclaux
1962–1964	Pedro Zubiría
1964–1966	Carlos Castellanos Goyoaga
1966–1968	Alvaro Libano
1968–1969	José Rafael Guzman

Period	Presidents after the merger
1970–1973	Alfonso Bernar
1973–1977	Rafael Guzman
1977–1979	Carlos Lipperheide
1979–1981	Ramón Zubiaga Carles
1981–1984	Carlos Castellanos Borrego
1984–1987	Jorge Churruca
1987–1989	Juan Luis Wicke Laca
1989–1993	Javier Cardenal
1993–1997	José Luis Azqueta
1997–2001	José Manuel Loredo
2001–2005	José Luis Ribed
2005–2010	Javier Chávarri
2010–2014	Gerardo Teijeira
2014–2018	Estanislao Rey-Baltar
2018–2022	Ramón Zubiaga
2022–present	Manuel Sendagorta

== Legacy ==
Currently, the Royal Maritime Club of Abra-Real Sporting Club continues to operate at its headquarters in Getxo, preserving old memories such as photographs signed by Alfonso XIII, the rudder wheels of the frigate Numancia (the one from the 1989 Callao bombing), the snipe with which Alonso Allende and Laiseca were world champions, dozens of caricatures of old partners.
