= José Arana (footballer, born 1872) =

Spanish footballer and sports leader (1872–1909)

Personal information
- Full name: José Antonio Víctor Yldefonso de Arana Urigüen
- Date of birth: 1872
- Place of birth: Bilbao, Spain
- Date of death: 31 December 1909 (aged 37)
- Position: Midfielder

Senior career*
| Years | Team | Apps | (Gls) |
| 1901–1902 | Bilbao Football Club | | |
| 1902 | Club Bizcaya | | |
6th president of Real Sporting Club
In office 1908–1910
| Preceded by | Tomas Zubiría Ybarra |
| Succeeded by | Alberto Aznar |
- * Club domestic league appearances and goals

José Antonio Víctor Yldefonso de Arana Urigüen (born 1872 – 31 December 1909) was a Spanish footballer who played as a midfielder and who won the 1902 Copa de la Coronación with Club Bizcaya.

== Early life ==
José Antonio de Arana was born in 1872, and was baptized on 18 November 1872 at the Church of Saint Anthony the Great in Bilbao as the son of Pedro Darío Arana Mendiolea (born 1840) and Sofía Urigüen Ansótegui. He was the first of ten children, including two older brothers who also played football, Luis Arana (1874–1951) and Darío (1882–). He married Irene Churruca Murga.

== Sporting career ==
In 1898, the 26-year-old Arana and his younger brother Luis were among the founders of Sporting Club de Bilbao, becoming the club's member no. 8 by 1902. He went on to preside over the club between 1908 and 1910. In the summer of 1908, King Alfonso XIII, arrived in Bilbao on board the royal yacht Giralda on 15 August, and he was met by the flotilla of sloops of Sporting, which was then chaired by José Antonio de Arana, and the steamer Elcano with the representatives of the Cortes, Tomas Zubiría Ybarra, Juan Tomás Gandarias, and the local authorities.

=== Football ===
In the late 1890s, José Antonio and Luis began playing football with an informal group led by Carlos and Manuel Castellanos, the so-called Bilbao Football Club, the first entity to play football in Bilbao since the disappearance of Club Atleta. Although it was formed in 1896, it was not until 30 November 1900 that Bilbao Football Club was officially established. Arana then played several friendly matches for them against city rivals Athletic Club in the Hippodrome of Lamiako.

In 1902, the two rivals agreed to join the best players of each club to face the Bordeaux-based side Burdigala, and this temporary merge became known as Club Bizcaya and despite the inclusion of six English from Bilbao FC, Ugalde earned a spot in the starting eleven in Bordeaux on 9 March, the first time a Bilbao team played on foreign territory, helping his side to a 2–0 win. Together with Juan Astorquia, Alejandro de la Sota and William Dyer, he was part of the Bizcaya team that won the 1902 Copa de la Coronación, and although he did not play in the final, Ugalde started in the quarterfinals against RCD Espanyol (5–1) and in the semifinals against New Foot-Ball Club (8–1).

== Death ==
Arana died on 31 December 1909, at the age of 37.
