= Alejandro Acha =

Spanish footballer (1878–1917)

Personal information
- Full name: Alejandro Acha Bárcena
- Date of birth: 22 July 1878
- Place of birth: Abando, Spain
- Date of death: 16 December 1917 (aged 39)
- Place of death: Spain
- Position: Goalkeeper

Senior career*
Years	Team	Apps	(Gls)
1901–1904	Athletic Club		
- * Club domestic league appearances and goals

Alejandro Acha Bárcena (22 July 1878 – 16 December 1917) was a Spanish footballer who played as a goalkeeper for Athletic Club. He was one of the most important footballers in the amateur beginnings of Athletic Bilbao, being among the 7 founders of the club in 1898, and then serving the club as a secretary and as its first goalkeeper, winning the 1903 Copa del Rey, the first official national championship.

In addition to football, he also excelled in cycling.

== Playing career ==
Alejandro Acha was born in the Biscayan town of Abando on 22 July 1878, and like so many other youngsters from that region, he began playing football games at Hippodrome of Lamiako, which at the time was the home of organized football in Biscay. In 1898, he was one of the 7 Basque football enthusiasts belonging to the Gimnásio Zamacois who began to organize football matches against the British workers in Lamiako, thus founding the Athletic Club. Although the club was founded in 1898, Athletic was not officially established until 5 September 1901, in the infamous meeting held at the Café García, in which Acha was one of the 33 members who signed the documents that officially established the Athletic Club.

Acha was the club's first-ever goalkeeper, being described as an "iron herculean" and "giant", playing several friendly matches against city rivals Bilbao Football Club at the Hippodrome of Lamiako, including their first-ever clash on 1 December 1901, which ended in a draw, so a replay took place two weeks later on 15 December, where he helped his side keep a clean-sheet in a 1–0 victory. He thus played a pivotal role in this historic rivalry that served as one of the drivers of football as a mass phenomenon in Bilbao since their duels aroused great expectation.

In 1902, the two rivals agreed to combine the best players of each club to face the Bordeaux-based side Burdigala; this temporary merge became known as Club Bizcaya, but Acha never played for this team, having been ousted by Bilbao FC's goalkeeper Luis Arana, who went on to help Bizcaya win the first national championship disputed in Spain, the 1902 Copa de la Coronación, the forerunner of the Copa del Rey. In 1903, Arana became a member of the Athletic board, of which Alejandro Acha was secretary.

That same year, Acha was able to reclaim his spot between the posts, in which he played a crucial role in the Athletic team that won the 1903 Copa del Rey, helping his side to a 3–2 comeback win over Madrid FC (now known as Real Madrid) in the final, where he played alongside the likes of Alejandro de la Sota, and club founders Juan Astorquia and Eduardo Montejo. He was also part of the team for the 1904 Copa del Rey, which Athletic won without playing a single match since their opponents failed to turn up.

== Death ==
In the mid-1910s, creditors seized Athletic's clubhouse on Calle Nueva, where the precious trophy was located, but Acha got there first and took it with him. The cup was missing until Acha died on 16 December 1917, at the age of 39, when Athletic asked his family to search his house, finding the trophy inside an old trunk; the cup never again left the trophy room.

== Honours ==
Athletic Club

- Copa del Rey:
  - Champions (2): 1903 and 1904
