= Santiago Martínez de las Rivas =

Spanish footballer and sports leader

Personal information
- Full name: Santiago Martínez de las Rivas Tracy
- Date of birth: 1877
- Place of birth: Bilbao, Spain
- Date of death: 6 February 1906 (aged 29)
- Place of death: Madrid, Spain
- Position: Defender

Senior career*
Years	Team	Apps	(Gls)
1901–1902	Bilbao Football Club		
1st president of Real Sporting Club
In office 1898–1900
Succeeded by	Pedro Laiseca
4th president of Real Sporting Club
In office 1904–1906
Preceded by	Enrique Careaga
Succeeded by	Tomas Zubiría Ybarra
- * Club domestic league appearances and goals

Santiago Martínez de las Rivas Tracy (1877 – 6 February 1906) was a Spanish sportsman who played football with Bilbao Football Club as well as a yachtsman who served as the president of the Real Sporting Club from 1898 to 1900, and again from 1904 to 1906.

== Early life ==
Santiago Martínez de las Rivas was born in 1877, (Note: One source wrongly states that he was born in 1868.) as the son of José María Martínez de las Rivas and his first wife Augusta Cecilia Tracy. He was the second of four children, all sisters, Antonia María (1869–1942), Mariana (1877–), and Carmen (1879–1899).

Martínez de las Rivas married his cousin Caridad Martínez de las Rivas y González (1881–1924), and the couple had one child, Santiago Martínez de las Rivas y Martínez de las Rivas, born in 1903. His son died in 1937 while trying to switch to the national party during the Spanish Civil War.

== Sporting career ==
=== Footballer ===
In the late 1890s, Martínez de las Rivas began playing football with an informal group led by Carlos and Manuel Castellanos, the so-called Bilbao Football Club, the first entity to play football in Bilbao since the disappearance of Club Atleta, a multi-sports club that mainly consisted of the British workers of the Nervión Shipyards, which had been founded by his father in 1889. Although it was formed in 1896, it was not until 30 November 1900 that Bilbao Football Club was officially established.

Rivas then played some friendly matches for them against city rivals Athletic Club in the Hippodrome of Lamiako, which at the time was the home of organized football in Biscay. For instance, on 15 December 1901, he played for Bilbao FC as a defender alongside Enrique Careaga, keeping a clean-sheet in a 2–0 victory. For the next match on 19 January 1902, which was the first time that a paid match was held in Biscay with a ticket price of 30 cents of a peseta, he and Careaga were not available, and as a result, Bilbao FC lost 2–4. The chronicles of time described him as a calm and confident player.

=== Yachtsman ===
In 1898, the 21-year-old Martínez de las Rivas and his father were among the founders of Sporting Club de Bilbao, being appointed as the club's first president, a position that he held for two years until 1900, when he was replaced by Pedro Laiseca. By 1902, he was the club's member no. 3, only behind the renowned politicians Federico de Moyúa and Luis Arana. He built Carita II and Carita III at the Nervión shipyards, both under two tons, winning the King's Cup of Sailing in 1904 with Carita II, with him as skipper. In 1905 he participated in the regattas of Kiel, with Enrique Careaga's sloop Princesa de Asturias.

In 1904, Martínez de las Rivas returned to the club's presidency, and in the following year, he visited King Alfonso XIII, who showed him the desire to create a regattas Cup in Bilbao, with the Real Sporting Club in charge of writing the regulations. He once again held the presidency for two years, but this time it came to an end due to his unexpected death in 1906. (Note: One source wrongly states that he died on 16 May 1902.) On 6 February 1906, aged 29, he committed suicide in Madrid.
