= José María Olabarría =

Spanish politician, football manager, and sports leader

13th President of Athletic Bilbao
- In office 1933–1935
- Preceded by: Manuel Castellanos
- Succeeded by: Luis Casajuana

Personal details
- Born: José María Olavarria Martínez de las Rivas; 9 March 1899 Bilbao, Spain
- Died: Unknown Bilbao, Spain
Association football career
Managerial career
- Years: Team
- 1935: Athletic Bilbao (3)

José María Olavarria Martínez de las Rivas was a Spanish politician and sports leader who served as the 13th president of Athletic Bilbao between 1933 and 1935. Under his presidency, the club enjoyed sporting successes, winning one La Liga title in 1933–34, but he is best known for being only president who, at a certain point, dared to work as a coach.

== Early life ==
José María Olavarría was born on 9 March 1899 in Bilbao, Biscay as the son of Carmen Martínez de las Rivas Tracy, daughter of José María Martinez de las Rivas, owner of the Astilleros del Nervión where Club Atleta was founded in 1892.

== Sporting career ==
In 1933, a few months after the proclamation of the Second Spanish Republic, Olabarría, a conservative politician and member of the Monarchist Democratic Party, was elected as the 13th president of Athletic Bilbao, a position that he held for two years until 1935, when he was replaced by Luis Casajuana. He inherited Athletic during one of its greatest periods, the club having just won its fourth consecutive Copa del Rey title under coach Fred Pentland, who left in 1933 and was replaced by Patricio Caicedo; under Olabarría's presidency the sporting success continued, winning one La Liga title in 1933–34.

Olabarría started the 1935–36 season, the last before the outbreak of the Spanish Civil War, on the bench as a coach, but he only led the team in the first three games (3–3 in Oviedo, 7–0 against Real Betis, and a 1–0 defeat at Hércules CF) before being replaced by Englishman William Garbutt, who finished the season and won the championship. Olabarría became the first president to work as a coach during his mandate.

== Political career ==
Olabarría was a municipal councillor in the Bilbao City Council on several occasions, being one of the three conservative councillors of its managing committee in 1934–35, an industrial engineer of the independent right in 1938–39, and a councillor in 1941–42.

It is unknown how Olabarría managed to survive the eleven months of the Civil War until the conquest of Bilbao by the factionalists; in any case, he appears well integrated into the local political society immediately after the fall of the city as a municipal councillor (member of the "independent right") and as a member of the board of directors (vocal) of an Athletic team.

The date of his death is unknown.
