= Alberto Aznar =

Spanish engineer, businessman, and politician

- Born: Alberto Lucas Ramón Aznar Tutor; 18 October 1864; Bilbao, Biscay, Spain
- Died: 30 March 1923 (aged 58); Madrid, Spain
- Citizenship: Spanish
- Occupations: Engineer; Businessman; Politician
- Known for: 1st president of the Neguri Golf Club

3rd president of Real Club Marítimo del Abra
- In office 1906–1908
- Preceded by: Tomas Zubiría Ybarra
- Succeeded by: Valentin Gorbeña

3rd president of Real Sporting Club
- In office 1910–1912
- Preceded by: José Antonio de Arana
- Succeeded by: Luis Arana

1st president of the Neguri Golf Club
- In office 1911–191?

Alberto Lucas Ramón Aznar Tutor (18 October 1864 – 30 March 1923) was a Spanish engineer, businessman, and politician. He was a deputy for Marquina between 1920 and 1923.

Aznar was the first president of the Neguri Golf Club, a position he held until his death, and was a member of both the Real Club Marítimo del Abra and Real Sporting Club of Bilbao, presiding over the former between 1906 and 1908 and the latter between 1910 and 1911. He was also the first Marquis of Zuya, a noble title that he held from 1920 until 1923.

== Early and personal life ==
Alberto Aznar was born on 18 October 1864 in Bilbao, as the fourth of the seven children of Eduardo Aznar de la Sota (1830–1902), a ship interpreter broker (maritime brokerage) in Bilbao and a senator for the province of Burgos, and of his wife, Luisa Tutor Fuentes (1840–1893). His father was first associated with his uncle Alejandro de la Sota (1820–1909), only ten years older than him, and later with his eldest son, his first cousin Ramon de la Sota.

In 1897, he married Jesusa de la Puente Atristain in Bilbao, with whom he had five children, Emilio (1898–1950), María de la Concepción (1900–1986), Luisa María (1904–1992), María Isabel (1904–1965), and José Ramón Aznar de la Puente (1905–1934).

== Professional career ==
After studying at the Vizcaíno Institute, Aznar obtained the title of industrial engineer in Barcelona in 1893, specializing in mechanics. When he returned to Bilbao, he joined the family mining business and, above all, the shipping business.

In March 1902, Alberto and his two older brothers Eduardo and Luis María (1862–1929) formed the limited partnership A. Aznar y Compañía, in which Alberto had 15 percent of the capital and 20 percent of the profits. When their father died without a will three months later on 15 June 1902, there were quarrels between his brothers, but in the end, all three inherited their father's political affiliation linked to monarchical conservatism. Furthermore, all three were deputies and senators of the Conservative Party, as well as important shipowners and industrialists of their time.

In the late 1890s, Alberto and his older brother Eduardo promoted the creation of other shipping companies: Compañía del Vapor Alaveaga (1898) and Compañía del Vapor Axpe (1899), which were followed shortly by the Compañía de Navegación Bat and the Vasco Cantábrica de Navegación, with a capital of 1,250,000 pesetas. He was one of the promoters of the Asociación de Navieros de Bilbao (Bilbao Shipping Association).

In 1917, Aznar became part of the first board of directors of the Altos Hornos del Mediterráneo, and he was also briefly a member of the Banco of Bilbao, since the appointment was agreed on 8 March 1923.

== Political career ==
In 1896, Aznar was a provincial deputy for the district of Markina. A few years later, in 1918, he ran with a group of conservatives, but lost to Indalecio Prieto, a socialist, and Pedro Chalbaud, a leader. They made a monarchical unification against the nationalists and Alberto Aznar was elected deputy to the Cortes for Markina on the candidacy of the Monarchist Action League with 75% of the votes in 1920, a position that he held for three years until 6 April, a week after his death.

Aznar was a conservative and although he was very close to Antonio Maura, he did not participate in Maura's party, despite having a similar ideology. He was a supporter of the conservative monarchy, and in 1919, he was the founder of the Las Arenas monarchical circle.

== Sporting career ==
Aznar was the first president of the Neguri Golf Club, a position he held until his death. In 1902, the 38-year-old Aznar and his older brother Luis María were among the founding members of Real Club Marítimo del Abra, being the no. 370 and 26 respectively. He was a member of both the Real Club Marítimo del Abra and Real Sporting Club of Bilbao, presiding over the former between 1906 and 1908 and the latter between 1910 and 1911.

== Death and legacy ==
On 20 December 1920, King Alfonso XIII granted him the aristocratic title of Marquis of Zuya by royal decree. His life was spent between Bilbao and Las Arenas, where he owned the Itsaosgane palace. At the end of the First World War, he was already living in Madrid, in Calle Almagro, where he died on 30 March 1923, at the age of 58. On the third anniversary of his death, the manifest mass of the chapel of Santo Cristo de la Salud on 29 March 1926, as well as all those celebrated on 30 March, were applied in the suffrage of his soul.

Neither his son Emilio nor his eldest daughter María de la Concepción had descendants, so when both died the noble title of Marquis of Zuya passed down to his third-born child on 3 September 1987, the 83-year-old Luisa María, who died in 1993 and was then succeeded by her daughter María de la Soledad Paloma Eulate y Aznar.
