= Luis Arana (athlete) =

Spanish footballer and Olympic sailor

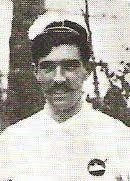
- Luis Arana on 1 January 1902

Personal information
- Full name: Luis Arana Urigüen
- Nationality: Spanish
- Born: 4 February 1874 Santander, Cantabria
- Died: 7 June 1951 (aged 77) Madrid
Association football career
- Position: Goalkeeper
Senior career*
Years	Team	Apps	(Gls)
1901–1902	Athletic Club		
1902	Club Bizcaya		
- * Club domestic league appearances and goals

Sailing career
- Sport: Sailing
- Class: 6 Metre
Competition record
Sailing
Representing Spain
Olympic Games
1928 Amsterdam	6 Metre

Luis Arana Urigüen (4 February 1874 – 7 June 1951) was a Spanish footballer who played as a goalkeeper who won the 1902 Copa de la Coronación with Club Bizcaya. He later became a sailor, representing his country at the 1928 Summer Olympics in Amsterdam, Netherlands.

== Early life ==
Luis Arana Urigüen was born on 4 February 1874 in Santander, Cantabria, as the son of Pedro Darío Arana Mendiolea (born 1840) and Sofía Urigüen Ansótegui. He was the second of ten children, including two brothers who also played football, José Antonio (1872–1909) and Darío (1882–).

Arana married Dolores de Ybarra y Lope de Calle, and the couple had three sons, Javier, Luis Ignacio, and José Antonio de Arana y Ybarra.

== Sporting career ==
In 1898, the 24-year-old Arana and his older brother José Antonio were among the founders of Sporting Club de Bilbao, becoming the club's member no. 2 by 1902, only behind Federico Moyúa.

=== Football ===
In the late 1890s, Luis and José Antonio began playing football with an informal group led by Carlos and Manuel Castellanos, the so-called Bilbao Football Club, the first entity to play football in Bilbao since the disappearance of Club Atleta. Although it was formed in 1896, it was not until 30 November 1900 that Bilbao Football Club was officially established. Arana then played several friendly matches for them against city rivals Athletic Club in the Hippodrome of Lamiako.

In 1902, the two rivals agreed to join the best players of each club to face the Bordeaux-based side Burdigala at Burdeos, France, which marked the first time a Bilbao team played on foreign territory. This temporary merge became known as Club Bizcaya and Arana ousted Athletic's goalkeeper to be part of the first-ever line-up of the Bizcaya team that faced Burdigala on 9 March, keeping a clean-sheet in an 0–2 away win. Together with Juan Astorquia, Alejandro de la Sota and William Dyer, he was part of the Bizcaya team that won the 1902 Copa de la Coronación, featuring in the final contributing decisively to a 2–1 win over FC Barcelona.

At the end of 1902, Bilbao FC began to show signs of financial exhaustion due to the non-payment of the appropriate fees by some of its partners who thus compromised the future of the entity. This moment of crisis caused Arana to be elected as the new president of the club, hence replacing Carlos Castellanos, but a loss of both interest and members in early 1903 worsened the situation. Arana was then approached by the president of Athletic, Juan Astorquia, who used their dier situation to successfully convince Arana of how beneficial and necessary it was to merge the two clubs. Once the negotiations had begun, the sudden death of Castellanos precipitated the outcome in a few days, concluding the final agreement on March 29 when both presidents signed the merger in which Bilbao FC was dissolved and all its partners became part of it.

=== Sailing ===
As a sailor, Arana won the 1912 Sailing Copa del Rey with the yacht Tonino, in Gijón. In that same year, he replaced Alberto Aznar as the president of Real Sporting Club, a position he held for a year until 1913 when José Maria Chávarri took over. In 1920, he replaced Julio Arteche as the president of Real Club Marítimo del Abra, a position he held for four years, until 1924, when Rogelio Renovales took over.

A few years later, Arana represented his country at the 1928 Summer Olympics in Amsterdam, Netherlands. Later, he was president of the Royal Spanish Sailing Federation between 1940 and 1945. Franco awarded him the Grand Cross of Naval Merit.

=== Golf ===
In addition to sailing and football, Arana also played golf. He won a very significant number of golf titles during the 1920s, becoming the champion of Spain in golf several times and he was succeeded as such by his sons Javier and Luis Ignacio, thus being the father of a great dynasty of golf players. Arana was the first president of the Spanish Golf Federation, although his responsibility was limited to two years, precisely those between 1934 and 1936.

=== Others ===
In 1936–37, Arana was also president of the Bilbao Society, a private club founded as a recreational and cultural society. In addition to forming part of the precursor of Athletic Bilbao, he also helped form the Athletic Federation of Vizcaya.

== Outside sport ==
Arana was a board member of several important industrial companies. Politically, he belonged to the Maurist Party and then to the Patriotic Union of Primo de Rivera. He was a friend of Alfonso XIII. In 1927 he was appointed provincial deputy by the Civil Directory of Primo de Rivera.

== Death ==
Arana died on 7 June 1951 in Madrid, at the age of 59.

== Honours ==
- Copa de la Coronación:
  - Champions (1): 1902
