= Toby Martinez de las Rivas =

British poet

- Born: 1978 (age 47–48); Somerset, UK
- Alma mater: Durham University

Toby Martinez de las Rivas is a British poet.

Often compared to Geoffrey Hill, he has been described as a religious poet, although he is personally agnostic.

== Career ==
Martinez de las Rivas studied Archaeology and History at Durham University. Originally from Somerset, he now lives in Córdoba, Spain. He has published three collections with Faber & Faber.

== Selected awards ==
- 2005: Eric Gregory Award
- 2008: The Andrew Waterhouse Award for New Writing
- 2014: The Wiener Holocaust Library International Book Art Prize
- 2018: shortlisted for the Forward Prize

== Selected publications ==
- —— (2009). Faber New Poets 2 - Toby Martinez de las Rivas. Faber & Faber. ISBN 9780571249961.
- —— (2014). Terror. Faber & Faber. ISBN 9780571296828.
- —— (2018). Black Sun. Faber & Faber. ISBN 9780571333790.
- —— (2023). Floodmeadow. Faber & Faber. ISBN 9780571376438.
