= 1894 Bilbao students v British workers football match =

- Event: Pioneering football in Spain
Bilbao students	British workers
(Spain)	(United Kingdom)
0	5
- Date: 3 May 1894
- Venue: Hippodrome of Lamiako, Bilbao
- Referee: M. R. Hendry
- Attendance: 100

The 1894 Bilbao students v British workers was a football match that took place at the Hippodrome of Lamiako, Leioa, on 3 May 1894. The match was contested by a group of Bilbainos who challenged the British residents in Bilbao to a football match, which at the time was a relatively unknown sport in Spain. The game was won comfortably by the British 5–0, but more important than the result was its historical significance, as it was probably one of the first ‘international’ matches in the history of the sport.

== Background ==
Bilbao, a city open to the world through the sea, kept close trade and industrial relations with at the end of the 19th century, thus becoming the home to an important British colony, which also played football, among whom a certain group of British employees of the Nervión Shipyards stand out, as they formed a multi-sports entity called Club Atleta, who played the first known football match in Bilbao on 4 April 1890 in a game between the club's members. Club Atleta then began playing against the crews of English ships made up of miners coming from Southampton, Portsmouth, and Sunderland to work in the various mining companies in the area, and also against English sailors who came to Bilbao in MacAndrews ships to work in the docks. These first matches were held on a field known as La Campa de los Ingleses, but it was in the Campo de Lamiako where football took off in Bilbao, with several Bilbainos swarming the field to watch the teams of British workers challenge each other every weekend, and inevitably, the local citizens began to play this sport as well. Some of these locals were Basques of well-off families who had studied in the United Kingdom and became fond of football there, and who upon their return to Bilbao felt the need to practice this sport.

In the spring of 1894, a group of young students who were enthusiastic about this new sport was brave enough to challenge the clearly superior British people of Bilbao. The local newspaper Noticiero Bilbaíno published said "challenge" in April, challenging the English residents in Bilbao to play a football match and they did not take long to respond, accepting it. The game was held on the Hippodrome of Lamiako, a horse racing course just outside of the city, located in the Lamiako neighborhood of Leioa. The match was agreed to take place at half past ten in the morning of 3 May 1894, which coincided with the launching of the Almirante Oquendo cruise ship, for which all employees were given a day off, and thus, with a busy Lamiako Racecourse available, this event aroused great expectation.

== Overview ==
Admission was free and there were plenty of curious friends of the town's football players. The Bilbao students wore white shirts and the British workers wore cream-colored. Some of the figures who started for the British that day were players from Club Atleta, such as the goalkeeper George Baird, Rearey, Armstrong, and Brand. The referee was a certain M. R. Hendry.

The English chose the field with their backs to the sun, and from the first moment, they dominated. The Bilbao midfield, who played a lot, was containing the British and this excited the people from Bilbao, but the Britons reacted, they were stronger and easily outplayed the people from Bilbao. The English scored two early goals, but a section of the public was not satisfied with the British more physical approach and protested, and some of them decided to invade the field. The local players appeased their friends and convinced them that the English were doing the right thing.

In the first half, the English were winning by three to nil, and at the break, the British gifted them eleven roasted chickens. It still is unknown whether this was just a display of courtesy or just a strategy. The break was prolonged more than necessary due to the after-meal and the digestion of the chickens. When the game resumed, the English scored a couple more goals to seal a clear victory. The score is not clear, it seems that it was 5–0 although it can also be read as 6–0 in some chronicles.

== Final details ==
3 May 1894
10:30

Bilbao students (Spain)	0–5 (Note: The result is listed in some sources as having been a 0–6 win for the British.)	(England) British workers
	Report

Hippodrome of Lamiako, Bilbao
Attendance: 100
Referee: M. R. Hendry

GK	1	(Spain) S. Borden
DF	2	(Spain) J. Alarcón
DF	3	(Spain) R. Lecué
MF	4	(Spain) B. Zavala
MF	5	(Spain) V. Milicua
MF	6	(Spain) Blas de Otero
FW	7	(Spain) Antonio Zubillaga
FW	8	(Spain) P. Unzueta
FW	9	(Spain) J. Azcué
FW	10	(Spain) F. San José
FW	11	(Spain) G. Greanos

GK	1	(England) George Baird
DF	2	(Scotland) Hamilton
DF	3	(Republic of Ireland) Wilson
MF	4	(Scotland) McDonald
MF	5	(England) Rearey
MF	6	(England) Sneddon
FW	7	(England) Bell
FW	8	(England) Bruce
FW	9	(England) A. Roblo
FW	10	(Scotland) Armstrong
FW	11	(England) Brand

== Aftermath ==
The local newspapers, still quite unsure of how the rules of the sport worked, reported that the Englishmen had won by ‘five points’. After the match, the Brits brought the beaten team roasted chickens as a consolation for the heavy defeat, and a prize out of respect for the audacity of the challenge.

The result did not discourage the local population, who continued their newfound love affair with this British sport, which was particularly popular among the youth, including those Basque students who returned from the United Kingdom. Just a month later, in June, from the Gimnásio Zamacois, a popular physical culture center established in Bilbao in 1879 by a group of enthusiastic sportsmen led by the gymnast José Maria Zamacois, the Zamacois Gymnastic Society was created, a meeting point for a large number of athletes who would end up succeeding in different sports, mainly football. This society would later be the catalyst for the founding of Athletic Bilbao.

Between 1894 and 1895, the Lamiako facilities experienced spectacular growth in terms of the number of meetings, which were usually contested on Sunday mornings by the British, both workers from the Shipyards and from the various mining companies in the area, but increasingly also against the locals.

The Irish international Wilson would later appear in Barcelona in 1895 as a player of the English Colony of Barcelona Football Team, which means that some of these English workers not only contributed to the development of football in Bilbao, but also in other regions of Spain.

== See also ==
History of Athletic Bilbao
