= Pedro José de Galíndez =

Spanish sailor

Personal information
- Full name: Pedro José de Galíndez Vallejo
- Nationality: Spanish
- Born: 1 January 1892 Kensington
- Died: 1 January 1971 (aged 79)

Sailing career
- Sport: Sailing
- Class: 6 Metre
Competition record
Sailing
Representing Spain
Olympic Games
1928 Amsterdam	6 Metre
- Updated on 18 March 2015

Pedro José de Galíndez Vallejo (January 1892 – 2 October 1971) was a sailor from Spain, who represented his country at the 1928 Summer Olympics in Amsterdam, Netherlands.

== Sources ==
- "Pedro José de Galíndez Bio, Stats, and Results". Olympic Sports. Sports-Reference.com. Archived from the original on 18 April 2020.
