= Copa del Rey de vela =

Sailing competition held in Palma de Mallorca

The Copa del Rey de Vela is a sailing competition held in Palma de Mallorca, Spain, organized by the Real Club Náutico de Palma. Its current commercial name is Copa del Rey MAPFRE, due to the sponsorship of the MAPFRE company. Previous sponsors were the Puig companies (1985–2006); Audi and Camper (2007); and Audi and MAPFRE (2008–2012). It is the most important cruising sailing regatta in the Mediterranean Sea.

The Copa del Rey was established by Alfonso XIII in 1905. Under the reign of Juan Carlos I, the competition was reinstated in 1982, being celebrated in Palma de Mallorca, traditionally held in the Bay of Palma, and organized by the Real Club Náutico de Palma. Passionate about this sport, in which he was an Olympian in the 1972 Games, Don Juan Carlos won the prestigious Palma tournament five times and continues to be, along with Pedro Campos, the most successful skipper in the history of the competition. Along with him, in his crew or in rival boats, all the great figures of sailing, Spanish and international, have competed in the Copa del Rey.

== History ==
=== Origins ===
The Copa del Rey was established by Alfonso XIII in 1905, in imitation of the Cowes Week, with the patronage of the King of England, and the Kiel Week, with that of the Emperor of Germany, and it was held for the first time in Getxo, the King's summer resort, organized by the Real Sporting Club, within the so-called Bilbao Week.

Between 1912 and 1919, it was held in Gijón, organized by the Real Club Astur de Regatas (RCAR), and with the participation of Alfonso XIII in the 1912 and 1913 editions. The people of Gijón already knew the monarch from his visit in 1900, when a teenage Alfonso XIII made a triumphal entry accompanied by the queen regent Maria Christina of Austria, but now the circumstances were different, and in the first edition held in Gijón, on 20 July 1912, Alfonso XIII himself won the Copa del Rey, for yachts of 8, 7, and 6 Metre, skippering the Giralda II. At the time, RCAR was not even a year old and the transfer of land for the construction of the summer pavilion in the old San Pedro battery had not been resolved, so the authorities and personalities attending those first sailing competitions had to enjoy the regatta from an improvised terrace, which was located in the same place where the club would build its facilities shortly after. In the 2012 Summer Olympics, RCAR won a gold medal thanks to Ángela Pumariega, an excellent triumph that coincided precisely with the year that marks the centenary of the first regattas held in the bay of Gijón by the RCAR.

=== Recent history ===
Under the reign of Juan Carlos I, the competition was reinstated, and in its first two editions it was held under the protection of the International Mediterranean Championship (IMC), which Spain was to organize, which meant that, from its origin, it was a calling for sailors from many countries. The number of participants in its debut exceeded fifty for a total of 58 boats, of which 35 were Spanish, many of them being attracted by the IMC, the setting in which the first two editions were held. The first boat to engrave its name in the winners' list was the Italian "Nat", a One tonner owned by Carla Toffoloni. It was a complete success, and that premiere established a level that the RCN of Palma no longer wanted to give up.

The relevance of that first edition was such that in the following year, the spectacular Maxis also attended, luxurious sailboats of great length that contributed to giving an atmosphere of a great nautical exhibition in Palma. The splendor of the regatta increased at the same time as the Spanish high competition fleet itself and in 1983 the victory was won by a Balearic boat, the "Barracuda" of the Mallorcan Pepín González. González soon died in an accident, but the Copa del Rey honors his memory with a trophy that since 1990 has rewarded the best Spanish design.

The 1984 and 1985 editions witnessed the dominance of the Bribón IV, owned by the Catalan shipowner José Cusí, and established the tradition of King Don Juan Carlos sailing in "his" regatta. He would win it again in 1993, with Bribón VIII; and again in 1994, with the Bribón IX, and in 2000 with the powerful 53-foot (16-meter-long) sailboat designed by Bruce Farr. The 2011 edition saw the farewell of the Bribón, the sailboat on which King Juan Carlos I competed for almost four decades, so the event brought together very special characteristics.

The 1985 edition marked the entry of the Puig family as sponsors of the regatta, and with Puig's drive, 1988 had a total of 106 registered boats, exceeding one hundred for the first time, and of them 38 were new and 34 were sponsored, which gives an idea of the importance that the sailing spectacle had achieved in the bay of Palma. The 1987 edition was scored for the Maxi class world circuit.

In the early 1990s, the tables turned and the traditional hegemony of foreign units gave way to a new batch of Spanish owners, skippers, and crew who took the podium in the first five years of the 90s. Names such as Josele and Noluco Doreste, José Luis Suevos, Pedro Campos, and Jaime Yllera registered their triumphs between 1990 and 1995, opening the way for the national sailors who would come later. Cusí's "Bribon" also did not want to miss out, taking two new victories in 1993 and 1994, adding to his record a total of four Copas del Rey.

The last five years once again spoke almost exclusively Spanish. In addition to winning projects by established owners such as José Cusí (the "Bribón" won its fifth title in 2000), others emerged, such as the "Cutty Sark" by Pelayo de la Mata, which won in the 1996 and 1997 editions. Furthermore, José Luis Suevos would win his second Copa del Rey title with "Nationale Neddelanden" in 1997.

At the beginning of the decade, the dominant party was "Caixa Galicia" created by Vicente Tirado and designed by Botín & Carkeek, which achieved a milestone: winning the Copa del Rey three consecutive years: 2002, 2003, and 2004. The 2003 edition also experienced a notable sporting event, such as the participation of numerous Copa América sailors on board national and international projects, a fact that considerably increased the prestige of the Copa del Rey MAPFRE. Other notable milestones at this time were the double victory in 2008 of "El Desafío", which became the first team to achieve victory in two different classes (TP52 and GP42) in the same year.

Despite the imminent celebration of the 2012 Olympic Games and the World Tour having ended just two weeks earlier, a total of 110 boats still gathered in the bay of Palma divided into a total of seven classes in which foreign representatives dominated. In 2013, Prince Felipe VI, who participated as patron of "Aifos", presided over the awards ceremony held in Ses Voltes.

== System changes ==
The first system that was used produced a single winner of the Copa del Rey each year, but in 1988, the IMS system also came into action, so from then on there was a winner in each division. In 1994, the IMS was divided into Racing and Cruising, because the evolution of the designs made it unfeasible, and unfair, to group all the boats in the same classification. In 1992 and 1994, the barrier of one hundred participants was again surpassed, despite the fact that the fleet was immersed in the transition from IOR to IMS and the subsequent adaptations of the ships from one system to another. Neither the economic crisis of 1993 nor the gradual disappearance of the IOR units affected a Copa del Rey that gave unequivocal signs of having a life of its own and aspiring to become the top regatta event in the Mediterranean. In 1998 an attempt was made to find a formula that would give a single winner: A fleet of 127 boats was grouped into three divisions: IMS Regatta, IMS Cruise-Regatta, and IMS Cruise, but in such a way that a single joint classification ended up emerging. With 127 boats, the Copa del Rey became the most important cruising competition in the world that year.

The surprise was the victory of a production boat, the "Estrella Damm", by Ignacio Montes de León, a Beneteau First 40.7 from the Cruise-Regatta division, who managed to beat sailboats of much higher rank with a relatively modest budget. The controversy was immediate, and the result was that the following year, in 1999, the fleet was grouped by length, that is, by size: a Group A for the largest and fastest and a Group B for the smallest ones, so everything was much more coherent on the race course. In Group A there was also the rebirth of Spanish designs after the old success of 1983, since it was won by Manuel Chirivella's "Zurich", a 46-footer designed by the Cantabrian Marcelino Botín, who today is part of the elite of the best naval architects of the world. Ever since, groups A and B ended up being called IMS 500 and 600, respectively.

== Sponsors ==
The 1985 edition marked the entry of the Puig family as sponsors of the regatta through its Agua Brava brand, which opened a twenty-year collaboration that translated into an increasingly greater sporting and social dimension of the competition. In 2007 Audi took over the perfumery firm. In 2008, the insurance company Mapfre also joined as a sponsor, replacing Camper. Currently, Audi and Mapfre are the two major sponsoring companies of the event.

The last decade of the 20th century and the first of the 21st were the golden era due to the proliferation of projects sponsored by the main commercial brands.
