= Gurutzeta KFT =

Spanish football club

Gurutzeta
- Full name: Gurutzeta Kirol Futbol Taldea
- Nickname: Gurutze
- Founded: 1980 (as CFD Cruces)
- Ground: La Siebe, Barakaldo, Basque Country, Spain
- Capacity: 1,030
- Chairman: (Spain) Ricardo Jimeno
- Manager: (Spain) Israel Solar
- League: Primera División – Group 1
- 2024–25: Primera División – Group 1, 7th of 18
- Website: http://www.gurutzetafkt.com
Home colours	Away colours

Gurutzeta Kirol Futbol Taldea is a football team based in Barakaldo in the autonomous community of Basque Country. Founded in 1980, the team plays in Primera División – Group 1, holding home games at La Siebe, with a 1,030-seat capacity.

== Season to season ==
Season	Tier	Division	Place	Copa del Rey
1980–81	7	2ª Reg.	8th	
1981–82	7	2ª Reg.	3rd	
1982–83	6	1ª Reg.	13th	
1983–84	6	1ª Reg.	14th	
1984–85	6	1ª Reg.	6th	
1985–86	6	1ª Reg.	7th	
1986–87	6	1ª Reg.	3rd	
1987–88	6	1ª Reg.	4th	
1988–89	6	1ª Reg.	2nd	
1989–90	5	Reg. Pref.	10th	
1990–91	5	Terr. Pref.	20th	
1991–92	6	1ª Terr.	16th	
1992–93	6	1ª Terr.	14th	
1993–94	6	1ª Terr.	5th	
1994–95	6	1ª Terr.	13th	
1995–96	6	1ª Terr.	11th	
1996–97	6	1ª Terr.	13th	
1997–98	6	1ª Terr.	11th	
1998–99	6	1ª Terr.	13th	
1999–2000	6	1ª Terr.	7th	

Season	Tier	Division	Place	Copa del Rey
2000–01	6	1ª Terr.	5th	
2001–02	6	1ª Terr.	11th	
2002–03	7	1ª Div.	4th	
2003–04	7	1ª Div.	1st	
2004–05	6	Pref.	16th	
2005–06	6	Pref.	7th	
2006–07	6	Pref.	7th	
2007–08	6	Pref.	8th	
2008–09	6	Pref.	1st	
2009–10	5	Div. Hon.	14th	
2010–11	5	Div. Hon.	15th	
2011–12	5	Div. Hon.	14th	
2012–13	5	Div. Hon.	9th	
2013–14	5	Div. Hon.	12th	
2014–15	5	Div. Hon.	17th	
2015–16	6	Pref.	5th	
2016–17	6	Pref.	18th	
2017–18	7	1ª Div.	15th	
2018–19	7	1ª Div.	13th	
2019–20	7	1ª Div.	3rd	

Season	Tier	Division	Place	Copa del Rey
2020–21	DNP			
2021–22	8	1ª Div.	8th	
2022–23	8	1ª Div.	6th	
2023–24	8	1ª Div.	9th	
2024–25	8	1ª Div.	7th	
2025–26	8	1ª Div.		
