= Adolfo de Urquijo e Ibarra =

Adolfo de Urquijo e Ibarra, Count of Urquijo (1866–1933) was an Alfonsist politician, deputy, president of the Biscay deputation, publisher, and expert in Basque culture and history.
