= Ramon de la Sota =

Basque businessperson and politician

Sir Ramon de la Sota y Llano KBE (January 20, 1857, in Castro Urdiales – August 17, 1936, in Getxo) was a Basque lawyer, industrialist and prominent Basque nationalist activist. He was also the father of both Ramon de la Sota Aburto, as well as Manuel de la Sota "Txanka". King George V bestowed on him a knighthood of the Order of the British Empire, which entitled him and liked to be addressed as Sir.

At the turn of the 20th century, he became a major sponsor of the Basque Nationalist Party.

== Biography ==
Ramon was born to Alejandro de la Sota, hailing from Portugalete, and Alejandra de Llano, born in Castro Urdiales. He lived in his family's house at Muskiz for twenty years until he moved to Bilbao in 1868 ahead of the Second Carlist War, where he took up studies in the ''Instituto Vizcaino''. He completed a law degree in the Central University of Madrid.

On his comeback to Bilbao, he engaged in his professional activity. He took the reins of the pro-fueros Sociedad Euskalerria, often referred to as the euskalerriacos, and integrated it into the Basque Nationalist Party, a move that pushed the party towards more pragmatic political positions from 1898 to 1902. Thriving on the heat of Bilbao's industrial development during the first decades of the 20th century, his shipbuilding and mining businesses earned him one of the largest fortunes in the Basque Country and Spain altogether.

Ramon de la Sota married Catalina de Aburto, daughter of a prominent trader in Bilbao.

== See also ==
- History of the Basques
- Sabino Arana

== Sources ==
- Watson, Cameron (2003). Modern Basque History: Eighteenth Century to the Present. University of Nevada, Center for Basque Studies. ISBN 1-877802-16-6.
