= José María Martínez de las Rivas =

Spanish industrialist and businessman

José María Martinez de las Rivas
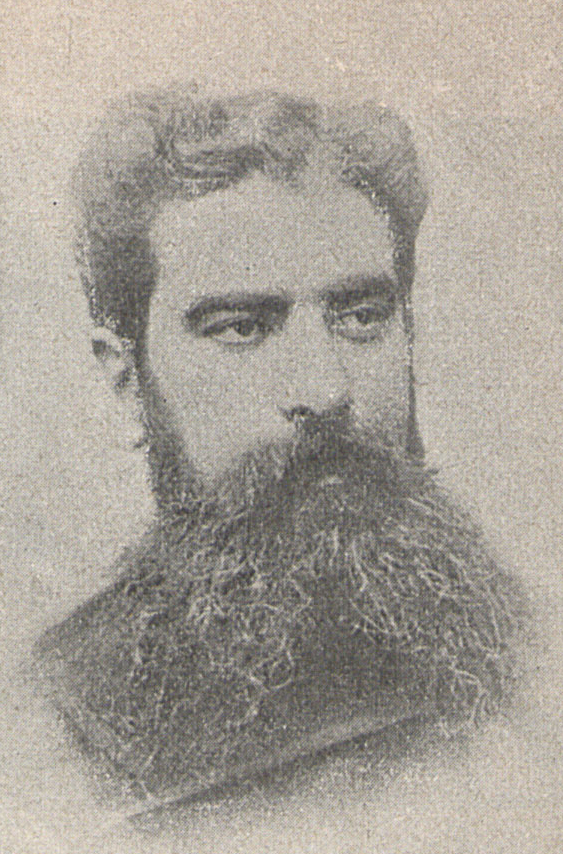
- José María Martinez de las Rivas in 1900
- Born: 29 September 1848; Galdames, Biscay, Spain
- Died: 13 April 1913 (aged 64); Madrid, Spain
- Citizenship: Spanish
- Occupations: Businessman; Industrialist
- Known for: Owner of the Astilleros del Nervión

José María Martinez de las Rivas (29 September 1848 – 13 April 1913) was a Spanish pioneer businessman in the industrialization of Biscay, promoting shipbuilding, steelmaking, mining exploitation, and house building.

He is best known for being the co-founder of the Astilleros del Nervión in 1889, where Club Atleta was founded in 1892.

== Early and personal life ==
José María Martinez de las Rivas was born on 29 September 1848 in Galdames as the fifth child of Santiago Luis Martinez de Lexartza (in the spelling of the time, Lejarza) from Galdames, and Antonia Deogracias de las Rivas Ubieta from Gordexola, and therefore, his real surname was Martinez de Lexartza de las Rivas. However, he was baptized as Martinez de las Rivas, combining his father's and mother's first names. His uncle, Francisco de las Rivas Ubieta, was a renowned industrialist, businessman, merchant, and ship owner. His parents moved from Galdames to Portugalete, where they built a palace called the Lexartza palace, which became known as Villa Antonia in the 20th century, and today is the seat of UNED in Biscay.

Martinez de las Rivas married twice, first Augusta Cecilia María Tracy Tool (1847–1879), and the couple had four children, Antonia María (1869–1942), who married Adolfo Urquijo Ybarra in 1888, Santiago, Mariana, and Carmen Martínez de las Rivas Tracy (1879–1899), who married Miguel Olavarría Zuasnavar in 1904. In his second marriage, María Richardson O'Connor, the couple had three children, María de las Mercedes (1895–1993), Francisco (1897–1970), and María del Carmen Martínez de las Rivas Richardson (1899–1978). Furthermore, his biographers point out that in his will he treated another young man named Reginal Joseph Murray with the same rights of his children, which seems to indicate that he should also be added to the list of his descendants.

== Industrialist activity ==
After studying in Bilbao, Martinez de las Rivas began his business-oriented training in 1860, traveling first to Madrid and then to London to gain experience in the wine exporting house of one of his uncle Francisco. His first wife Augusta was the daughter of one of his uncle's English partners. He began to divide his life between Great Britain and Spain, working as a mediator for the English iron industrialists who needed the ore from the mines of the Basque Country. When his uncle Francisco died in 1882, his only son was left with a fortune valued at nearly 70 million reales, and four years later, in 1886, Martinez de las Rivas bought the San Francisco del Desierto factory in Sestao from his cousin, transforming it into Altos Hornos San Francisco. Next to the San Francisco factory founded by his uncle, he co-founded the Nervión Shipyards in 1889, thus continuing the creative initiative of his uncle. When his cousin died without children in 1890, he became the owner of their properties in exchange for opening individual credit accounts for the other heirs, their mother and siblings, for the value of their rights.

Like other Biscayan businessmen of the time, he invested in mines, such as the so-called Coto Musel, Unión and Amistosa, the latter two in partnership with Somorrostro Iron Ore, as well as in iron and steel industries, electrical industries, shipping companies, banking, Et cetera. The Coto Musel was the first coal mine that was exploited in the municipality of Laviana, Asturias, and Rivas became the owner of the property in 1894, creating the company with one million pesetas of share capital and the first studies for its exploitation were directed by the engineer Juan Gandolfi. He also founded the shipping companies Vapores Fay and Somorrostro, the Marqués de Mudela steamship company and the Rivas steamship company.

In the miners' strike of 1890 he was the first to abolish compulsory barracks, in the Biscayan strike of 1911 he highlighted his position in favor of the workers and stated that most of the wealth was due to them.

=== Nervión Shipyards ===
Together with an English shipowner and politician named Charles Mark Palmer (1822–1907) from Newcastle, Martinez de las Rivas won the contract for the construction of three battleships for the Navy in 1888, after beating several rivals in a competition. The newspaper that Rivas controlled (El Noticiero Bilbaíno) carried out a major campaign to influence the process. On 1 June 1889, the contract was signed, and on 30 October of the same year, the Martínez Rivas Palmer Collective Company was registered in the Bilbao Mercantile Registry, dedicated to shipbuilding for the State, as well as for individuals. More than four thousand workers worked in those shipyards that occupied an area of 58,084 square meters in Sestao, and although based in Spain, there were between 200 and 500 British workers in the shipyards. The Nervión Shipyard's first work was the battleship María Teresa, launched on 30 August 1890, which was followed by the battleship Vizcaya on 8 July 1891, and by the battleship Almirante Oquendo on 4 October.

From then on, there were clashes between Martínez Rivas and Palmer, as well as controversies in the press about the situation of the shipyards and their viability. Finally, on 20 April 1892, the company suspended payments, and this was followed by dismissals, which were followed by workers' protests, which were followed by bitter political controversies, and as a result of all this, the Council of Ministers of 12 May 1892 ordered the apprehension of the Nervión Shipyards. After some legal and economic differences with the State, the Government seized the shipyards in 1892, closing them in 1895. The protest of the British workers compelled the State to keep Palmer as technical director, although most of them returned to Great Britain in 1894–95, and in November 1895, it was agreed to its dissolution and definitive liquidation.

After the Spanish–American War of 1898 (in which the three battleships built in the Nervión Shipyards would be sunk in Santiago de Cuba), and a long series of lawsuits and personal and political confrontations, they would re-open in 1900. The State returned the company to Martínez de las Rivas in 1900 when the lawsuit was resolved favorably for the Nervión Shipyards.

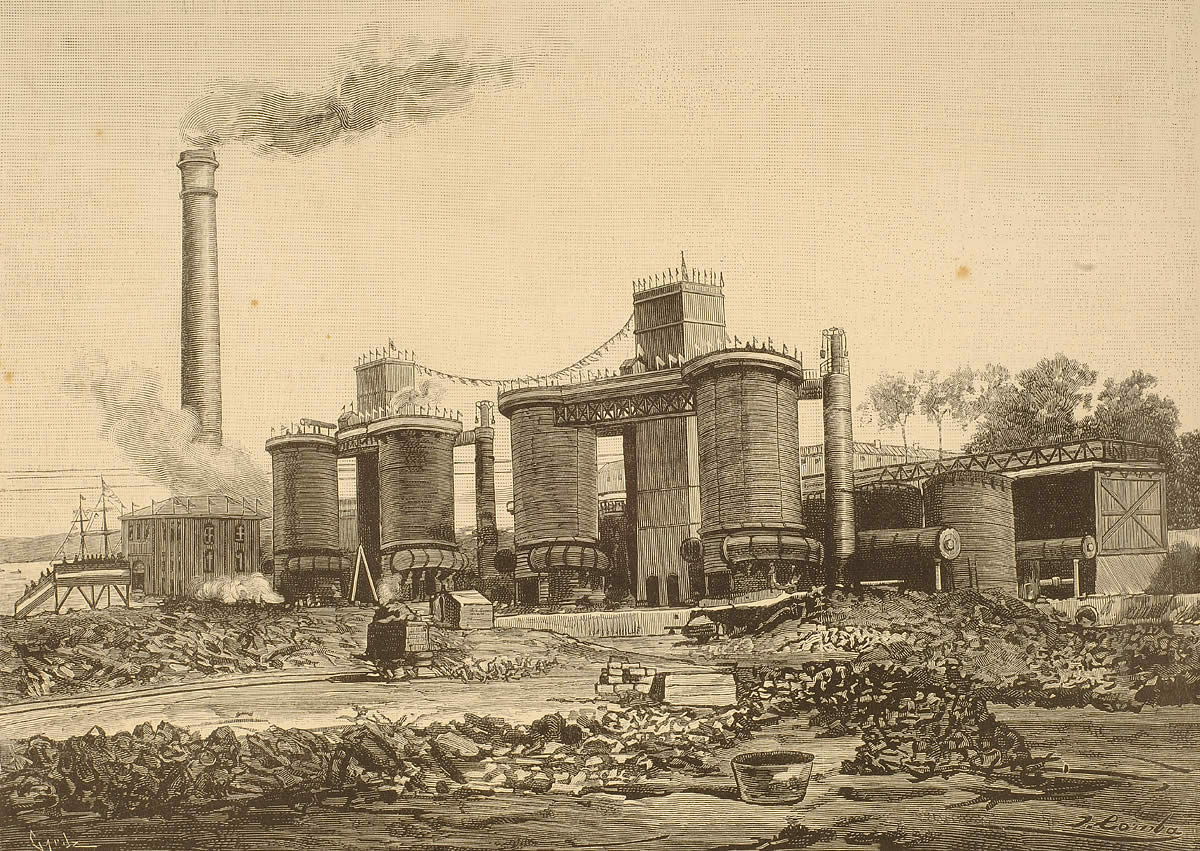
Altos Hornos San Francisco, Sestao, 1887.

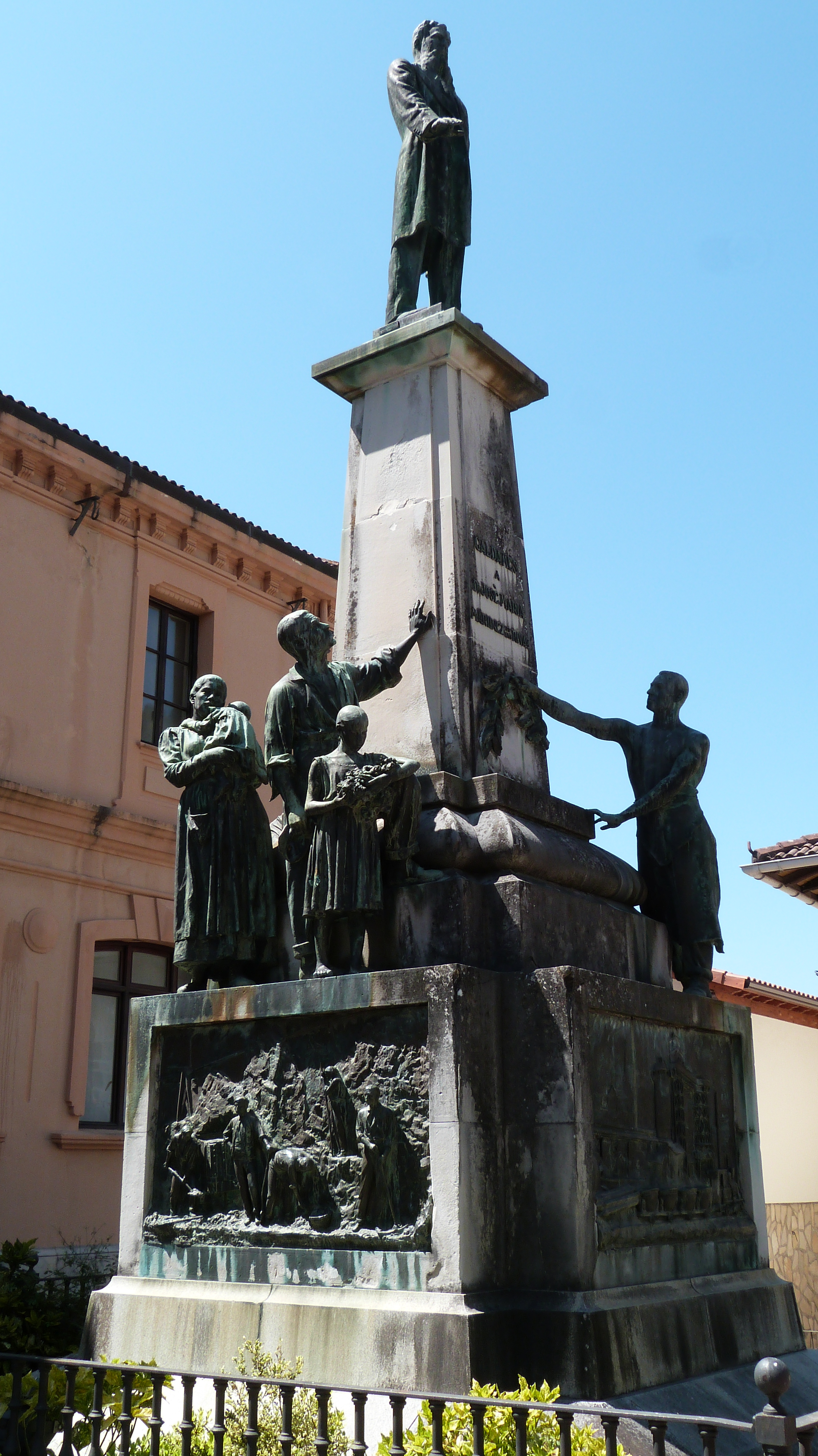
José María Martínez de las Rivas monument in San Pedro Galdames.

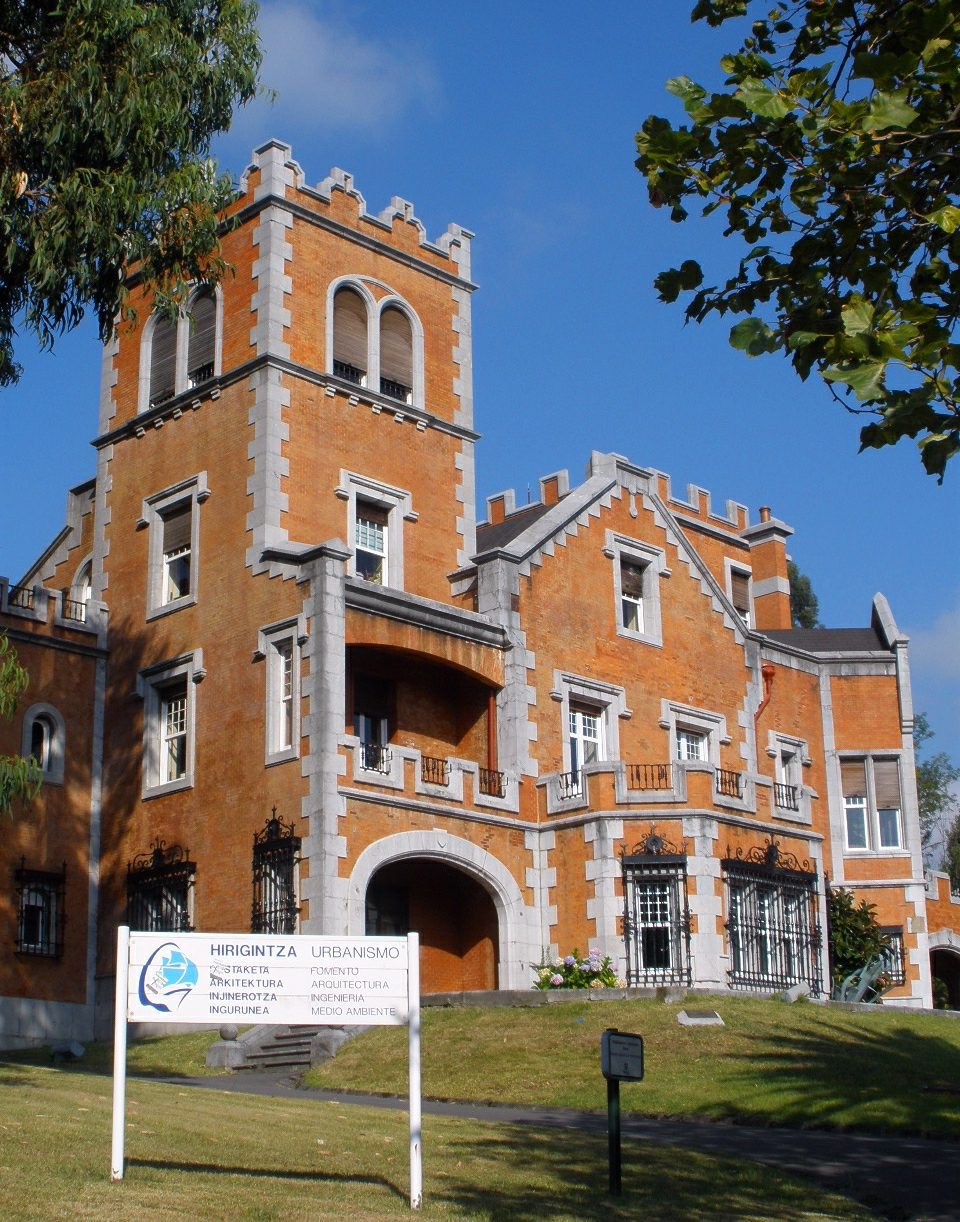
Martínez-Rivas house, Neguri.

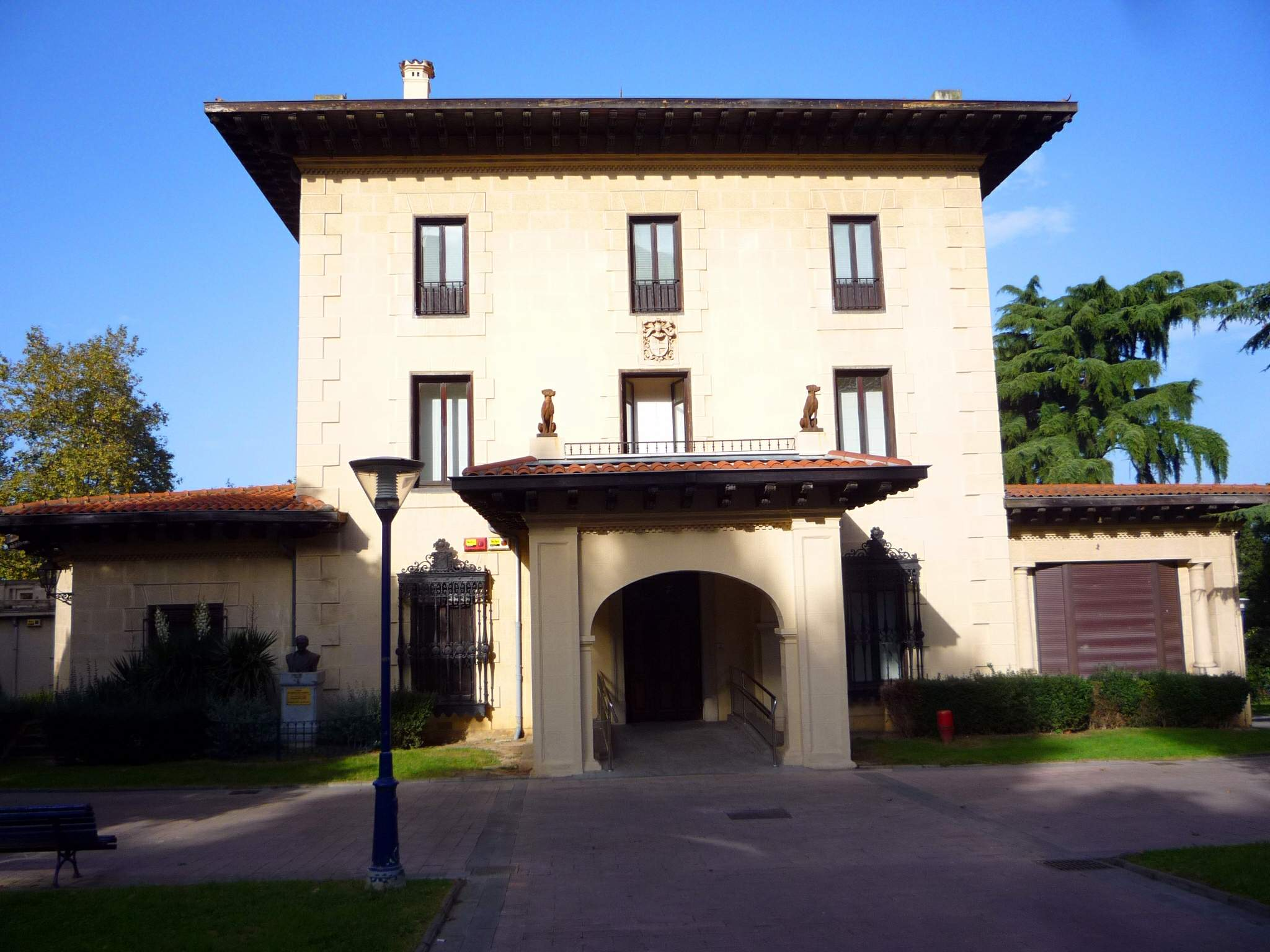
Lexartza palace, Portugalete

== Political career ==
Politically, Martínez de las Rivas was a conservative deputy in the 1891 Spanish general election and a candidate elected by Bilbao from 1896 to 1898. He also obtained the senator's seat in 1899, 1901, and 1903, which allowed him to exert pressure on the economic policy of the Government in favor of the expansion of the Biscayan industry. He was part of the famous Piña, sometimes facing Víctor Chávarri, but other times entering common lists with him.

== Sporting activity ==
In 1898, the 50-year-old Martinez de las Rivas and his oldest son Santiago were among the founders of Sporting Club de Bilbao, and by 1902, José María was an honorary member of the club as a deputy, and Santiago was the club's member no. 3, only behind Federico de Moyúa and Luis Arana. His son even went on to preside over the club in two different stages, between 1898 and 1900, and again between 1904 and 1906.

== Death ==
The sculptor Benlliure captured his physiognomy in a sculpture that stands in Galdames.

Martinez de las Rivas died in Madrid on 13 April 1913, at the age of 65, when he was one of the richest men in northern Spain and his fortune was valued at that time at about 16 million pesetas.

From that moment, the heirs of the Martínez Rivas House began to fragment the business unit to get rid of the lots that had belonged to them, and just eight years later, What had been one of the most powerful industrial networks in Spain no longer existed. In 1920, his heirs sold all the factory facilities and the Nervión Shipyards to Altos Hornos de Vizcaya for 43 million pesetas. Little by little all the pieces fell apart, except for one that the family wanted to keep: Coto Musel, due to its spectacular profits.
