= Eduardo Montejo =

Spanish footballer

Personal information
- Full name: Eduardo María Montejo Aristegui
- Date of birth: 15 August 1879
- Place of birth: Deusto, Biscay
- Date of death: 14 April 1962 (aged 82)
- Position: Forward

Senior career*
Years	Team	Apps	(Gls)
1902–1904	Athletic Club	2	(1)
- * Club domestic league appearances and goals

Eduardo María Montejo Aristegui (15 August 1879 – 14 April 1962) was a Spanish footballer who played as a forward for Athletic Club. Although little has been recorded of his life, he was one of the most important footballers in the amateur beginnings of Athletic Club, being among the 7 founders of the club in 1898, and then serving the club as a forward, netting a goal in the 1903 Copa del Rey Final, which was the club's first-ever official title.

== Biography ==
Born in Biscay, Montejo was one of the 7 students belonging to the Gymnasium Zamacois who founded the Athletic Club in 1898. Although the club was founded in 1898, Athletic was not officially established until 5 September 1901, in the infamous meeting held in the Café García, in which Montejo was one of the 33 socios (co-founders) of the club.

He then become one of the first footballers of the newly formed Athletic Club, playing as a forward. Together with Juan Astorquia, Alejandro de la Sota, Armand Cazeaux and Walter Evans, he was part of the team that won the first-ever Copa del Rey in 1903, in which Montejo contributed with the equaliser to level it at 2–2 in an eventual 3–2 comeback win over Madrid FC in the final. In the 1904 Copa del Rey Final, Athletic were declared winners again without playing a match after their opponents failed to turn up.

== Honours ==
- Copa del Rey: 1903 and 1904
