= Hippodrome of Lamiako =

Sports venue in Bilbao (1883–1934)

Campo de Lamiako
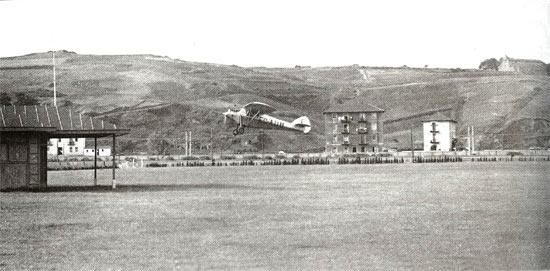
- Campo de Lamiako in the 1930s
- Interactive map of Campo de Lamiako
- Location: Lamiako, Bilbao, Basque Country

Construction
- Opened: 18 September 1887
- Demolished: 1934
- Cost: 30.000 pesetas

Tenants
- Club Atleta (1892–94) Athletic Bilbao (1901–05) Bilbao FC (1901–03) Club Vizcaya (1902)

The Limiako Hippodrome, or the Hippodrome of Lamiako, was a sports venue based in the Lamiako neighborhood of Leioa, Biscay, Basque Country. Originally an equestrian venue, it's now best remembered as a historic football venue. The Campo de Lamiako played a pivotal role in the early steps of football in the Basque Country as one of the first football fields in the city, serving as a practice ground for the city’s first known football matches between the members of the Club Atleta of the Nervión Shipyards. In 1894, the Limiako field hosted a match between young Bilbao enthusiasts and British workers, which is now regarded as one of the first ‘international’ matches in the history of the sport.

== History ==
=== Early years ===
Campo de Lamiako was founded on 18 September 1887, on the right bank of the Nervión, next to the electricity factory, towards Las Arenas, and near the train track. The goalposts were kept in the sentry box of one of the guards of the electricity factory. In that same year, the Nervión Shipyards were founded by the Martínez de las Rivas brothers (José María and Francisco) and an English partner named Charles Mark Palmer from Newcastle. The English employees of the Shipyards created a club called Club Atlético, which was dedicated to the practice of several sports, who were mostly held at Lamiako. On 27 August 1892, Lamiako hosted a series of sporting events organized by Atlético's president (Enrique Jones Bird), such as velocipede races, foot races and sack races.

Bilbao was introduced to football in the late 19th century by the British colonies that were based in the industrial zones. The first news of football in Biscay, Basque Country, appeared in 1892, when the president of the Club Atleta de Astilleros del Nervión (English: Athlete Club of the Nervión Shipyards) wrote to the local authorities in Lamiako asking for permission to use the Hippodrome of Lamiako as a football pitch from November to April (at the time, football was only played in the winter while cricket was the sport that occupied the summer). Permission was granted and the Hippodrome of Lamiako became the new home of football in the Basque Country. Even though the first games were only played by Englishmen, the local population and the Bilbainos who flocked to Lamiako every weekend to watch them play fell in love with the game and soon began to play it as well, going as far as to even challenge the British workers to a match in 1894, which was held in the Hippodrome of Lamiako and ended in a 0–5 loss to the locals.

=== Athletic Club and Bilbao FC ===
The result did not discourage the local population, who continued their new-found love affair with the British sport, and in fact, shortly after the match, some young people from the Zamacois Gymnasium in Bilbao, began to play football games in Lamiako, and in 1898, seven football enthusiasts belonging to the Zamacois gym (Juan Astorquia, Alejandro Acha, Luis Márquez, Fernando and Pedro Iraolagoitia, Enrique Goiri and Eduardo Montejo) opened a football practice center in the Hippodrome of Lamiako next to the electricity factory, thus unofficially founding a football society, which they called Athletic Club. Although founded in 1898, Athletic Club de Bilbao was not officially established until 5 September 1901, in a meeting held in the Café San Gervasio de Cassolas, in which they formalized the first board of directors with Márquez being named the club's first president and Astorquia the first captain.

At the end of 1900, a group of young Bilbainos from the upper class who had studied in England and learned about football there, such as Carlos Castellanos and his brother Manuel, together with a group of English workers, founded the Bilbao Football Club, and naturally, a rivalry soon arose between the two Bilbao teams. Since there were hardly any fields in Bilbao, the two sides agreed to share the Lamiako field, which they rented together. The owners, Enrique Aguirre and Ramón Coste, asked for a rent of 200 pesetas per year, and the two clubs accepted it. Lamiako was thus the home to one of the first great rivalries in the history of Spanish football, with the first game between the two sides taking place on 10 November 1901, ending in a goalless draw. The edges of the Lamiaco field did not give rise, not even remotely, to conflicts of agglomeration despite the public being made up of the relatives and friends of the players.

Lamiaco was the cradle of Bilbao football and should endure as a field dedicated to sports practice, and even, in any corner of it, a plaque should be placed reminding that on that soil began and cemented Biscayan football, which has given so much glory and so many triumphs to our people.

— José María Hernani

=== Arenas ===
During the break of the games, a cloud of boys and fewer boys invaded the "rectangle”, with their ball, and emulated what they had just seen. It cost a lot of lungs on the part of the referee to root them out, so the teams could play the second half. In training days, the venue was filled up with kids who, as soon as the train stopped, dropped down through the doors on the left side and ran onto the field to play the game. One of those groups was the youth from Las Arenas neighborhood. By 1901, they were playing weekly matches in Lamiako. In 1903 the same group would win the Copa Athletic, the biggest local tournament at the juvenile level, as well as play a match against Club Ciclista de San Sebastián, the precursor to Real Sociedad. They eventually founded a local team in 1909 with the name of Arenas Football Club, which would later become Arenas Club de Getxo, the Copa del Rey winners of 1919.

Because of the recurrent field invasions, Lamiaco was fenced with barbed wire in January 1902, and a sentry box was put up, right in the center of the train stop, for the sale of tickets and crowd control. The football enthusiasts who came by train thus had to pay, and it was beginning to be frequent for spectators to reach a thousand or two thousand. The first time the ticket was charged (or attempted to be charged), was on 19 January, on the occasion of a game between the co-tenants of the field, Athletic and Bilbao FC, who were playing each other for the fourth time. The games between these two sides began to arouse great expectation, so they began to charge a ticket price of 30 cents of a peseta. The first paid game in Biscay was played in the Lamiako field on 1 December 1901, ending in a draw at 1–1.

=== Club Vizcaya ===
In 1902, the two clubs agreed to join the best players of each club to face a foreign team, the Bordeaux-based side Burdigala. This temporary merge became known as Club Vizcaya. Campo de Lamiako had its record attendance on the day (31 March) Burdigala faced Bizcaya, the very first visit by a foreign team to Bilbao, gathering a crowd of three thousand spectators, a tremendous amount at the time. For the occasion, Lamiaco's international debut, and for the most respectable part of the audience, chairs were rented and brought from the Royal and Holy House of Misericordia. Such chairs were placed on the side of Las Arenas, with their backs to the sea, to the despair of the residents. Bizcaya defeated the French side by 7–1. Notably, Athletic recorded a 10–1 win over FC Barcelona in the Catalan's first visit to Lamiako.

Lamiaco used to host a championship called the Athletic Cup, in which all the teams that were teeming in Vizcaya took part, and the championship's last edition was won by Arenas de Getxo, thus reaching the region's first category in that year.

Despite the time, the memory of the history of Lamiako has been respected by its owners as if they feared profaning that land that saw the dawn of Biscayan football.

— José María Hernani

== Decline and collapse ==
In November 1910, the City Council of Lejona, to which the field belonged, decided to apply a flat-rate tax per party. Because of this, the Athletic board began its efforts to find a field in Bilbao. Lamiako thus missed the debut of Athletic's definitive uniform, red and white, which took place in January 1911 at Tiro del Pichón, in Madrid, and against its then owner Sociedad Gimnástica.
