= José Luis de Villabaso =

Spanish businessman and sports leader

- Born: José Luis Villabaso Gorrita; 20 August 1852; Bilbao, Biscay, Spain
- Died: 26 July 1917 (aged 64); Unknown
- Citizenship: Spanish
- Occupations: Industrialist; Sports leader
- Known for: President of Bilbao FC

President of Bilbao FC
- In office 1900–1900
- Preceded by: Carlos Castellanos
- Succeeded by: Carlos Castellanos

José Luis de Villabaso Gorrita (20 August 1852 – 26 July 1917) was a Spanish industrialist. He is best known for being the fundamental force behind the foundation of Bilbao Football Club in 1900, the very first official club in the city of Bilbao.

== Early and personal life ==
José Luis de Villabaso was born on 20 August 1852 in Bilbao, as the son of Juan Antonio Villabaso Uribarri and María Jesús Gorrita Echavarri. He married Isabel Zabaleta Larrañaga, and the couple had five children, Fernando, Luis, María de las Mercedes, Pilar, and Rafael Villabaso Zabaleta. His sister María Elisa married José María de Arteche y Osante, a liberal politician from Biscay who become the president of the Biscay delegation, and the couple had two children Antonio and Julio de Arteche y Villabaso.

The Villabaso family settled in the capital of Biscay, where they established relations with the elite of the Bilbao bourgeoisie.

== Professional career ==
Villabaso was a member of the first board of directors of the Banco del Comercio, which was founded in Bilbao on 20 May 1891. On 1 May 1901, the committees of the Banco del Comercio and the Banco de Bilbao signed the deed of liquidation of their respective companies to create a new Bank, which under the name of Banco de Bilbao. Villabaso, who had already been the managing director of Banco de Comercio, eventually became the chief executive officer (CEO) of Banco de Bilbao.

On 2 October 1905, Villabaso participated in a meeting, held in the Board Room of the Banco de Bilbao, that dealt with both the merger of the settlement of Elgoibar's debt and the merger of three railway companies, with his presence being not only on his own behalf as the director of Banco de Bilbao, but also on behalf of Domingo Villaamil Fernández del Cueto, the director of the Bilbao branch of the Bank of Spain, who could not attend due to being unwell.

His nephew Julio had planned to become an industrial engineer, but abandoned his studies when he was just three classes short of a degree after being appointed as a Director of the Banco de Bilbao in 1903, at 25 years of age, getting this position mainly thanks to the influence of his uncle. Both Julio and his uncle José Luis played a very active role in Consortium of Saltos del Duero and the Sociedad Hispano-Portuguesa de Transportes Eléctricos, two companies launched by the Banco de Bilbao to carry out the necessary procedures and works with which the most important hydroelectric business of the moment would be launched: the Saltos do Douro.

== Sporting career ==
On 30 November 1900, Villabaso used his own house in the Biscayan neighborhood of Algorta to host an informal meeting between the members of Bilbao Football Club, which had been playing football matches unofficially since 1896 under the leadership of Carlos Castellanos, whose father Manuel Castellanos he had known since at least 1891 when they were members in the first board of directors of Banco del Comercio. In this meeting, the club was finally officially established, a great step that was only possible thanks to the endorsement of Villabaso.

== Death and legacy ==
de Villabaso died in Barcelona on 26 July 1917, at the age of 64. After Villabaso's sudden death in 1917, and since the bank had begun to expand in Spain, José Manuel Figueras Arizcun was promoted to CEO of Banco de Bilbao after having previously served brilliantly in the Madrid Office and, before that, at Crédit Lyonnais, where he headed the General Sub-Directorate. Julio went on to be unanimously appointed by the Banco de Bilbao's board of directors to the chairmanship of the bank after the Annual General Meeting of 31 January 1942. His son Fernando went on to became the mayor of Bilbao in 1915.
