= Carlos Castellanos (footballer) =

Spanish footballer (1881–1903)

2nd President of Bilbao FC
- In office 1901–1903
- Preceded by: José Luis Villabaso
- Succeeded by: Luis Arana

Personal details
- Born: 1881 Bilbao, Spain
- Died: 1903 (aged 21-22) Bilbao, Spain
Association football career
- Full name: Carlos Castellanos Jaquet
- Position: Midfielder
Senior career*
Years	Team	Apps	(Gls)
1896–1902	Bilbao FC	+2	(0)
- * Club domestic league appearances and goals

Carlos Castellanos Jaquet (1881 – 1903) was a Spanish football pioneer who is widely regarded as one of the most important figures in the amateur beginnings of Football in the Basque Country, having been the fundamental head behind the foundation of Bilbao Football Club in 1900, the first-ever club in Bilbao, and then serving as the club's first president between 1901 and 1903.

Under his leadership, Bilbao FC merged with their city rivals Athletic Club to form a team that became known as Club Bizcaya, which won the 1902 Copa de la Coronación, the very first national tournament played in Spain.

== Early life ==
Castellanos was born in 1881 as the son of a Mexican father, Manuel Herculano de Castellanos Marín (1856–?) and of Manuela Carlota Ignacia de Jacquet, a native of Madrid and the daughter of Carlos Hipólito Jacquet y Saint-Mars, a wealthy Parisian banker of French origin, who had established himself as a merchant in Bilbao in 1860. He had a younger brother Manuel (1883–), while one of his cousins, María Mestayer de Echagüe, known as "Maritxu", became the first gastronomic journalist in the Basque Country and probably in Spain.

Being the son of a well-off family in Bilbao, he was sent to Britain to complete his studies, where he developed a deep interest in football. While studying abroad, Castellanos used to spend the summers in his hometown, and like many other Balbainos, he and his friends, who were also young Bilbao natives from the upper class, began to play football games in the Hippodrome of Lamiako, which at the time was the home of organized football in Biscay.

Castellanos is said to have been the first Spaniard to bring a ball and boots to the Iberian Peninsula, but this statement is most likely untrue.

== Football career ==
=== Founding Bilbao Football Club ===
In 1896, a group of friends led by the 15-year-old Castellanos, who used to spend the summer in the rooms of Hotel Antolín next to the Bilbao Abra in the Getxo town of Las Arenas, befriended a group of British people who used to pass through their leisure time at the hotel, and their friendship resulted in the idea of playing football together from time to time in the sandy areas where the Paseo de Zugazarte stands today. During his comings and goings to the United Kingdom, he had the opportunity to learn first-hand about the successful growth of professional football, and thus, through the correspondence he maintained with his brother Manuel, he recommended him the convenience of becoming a club. Apparently, this group of football pioneers led by Castellanos was constituted as Bilbao Football Club, thus following the same structure of English club names, where the name of the town where it belongs, "Bilbao", precedes the purpose of the association, "Football Club", contrary to the associations made up by Catalans and Spanish. They thus became the first entity to play football in Bilbao since the disappearance of Club Atleta.

Castellanos took command of the new sports center, which operated with complete regularity, and through their associates, they rented some of the nearby fields of Lamiako to play without problems when the occasion demanded. Between 1896 and 1900, their only rivals in the city were the crews of the MacAndrews shipping company, British citizens residing in the area for work reasons, and later Athletic Club, which was unofficially formed by Juan Astorquia in 1898. Bilbao FC, as both the oldest club and the club with the best organization, was the first to regularize its situation when it had their regulations approved at an undetermined time during the summer, and thus, on 30 November 1900, Bilbao Football Club was officially established in an informal meeting held in the house of industrialist José Luis de Villabaso, who knew his father Manuel Castellanos since at least 1891 when they were members in the first board of directors of Banco del Comercio. The entity's board was subsequently elected, with Castellanos being ratified as president.

=== Rivalry with Athletic Club ===
At the end of 1901, the two most important clubs in the city were Bilbao FC and Athletic Club, thus developing a rivalry between them, as they played several friendlies at the Hippodrome of Lamiako, which the two teams shared since there were hardly any fields in Bilbao at the time, and Castellanos played as a midfielder the first game between the two sides taking place on 10 November 1901, ending in a goalless draw. Castellanos was one of the most important figures in what is now regarded as one of the first football rivalries in Spain, one that helped turn football into a mass phenomenon in Bilbao since their duels aroused great expectation.

His next and last appearance as a footballer came on 9 March 1902, which ended in an 0–1 loss to Athletic.

=== Club Bizcaya ===
Under Castellanos's presidency, the two rivals agreed to join the best players of each club to play two games against the Bordeaux-based side Burdigala. This temporary merge became known as Club Bizcaya, and this team contested the very first national tournament played in Spain, the 1902 Copa de la Coronación, which Bizcaya won after a 2–1 victory over Joan Gamper's FC Barcelona.

=== Decline and death ===
At the end of 1902, Bilbao FC began to show signs of financial exhaustion due to the non-payment of the appropriate fees by some of its partners who thus compromised the future of the entity. This moment of crisis caused Castellanos to be replaced at the helm of the club by Luis Arana, but a loss of both interest and members in early 1903 worsened the situation, so Juan Astorquia, the then president and team captain of Athletic, approached Arana to convince of how necessary it was to merge the two clubs. Once the negotiations had begun, the sudden death of Castellanos in 1903, at the age of just 22, precipitated the outcome in a few days, concluding the final agreement on 24 March when both presidents signed the merger in which Bilbao FC was dissolved and all of its remaining members and associates were officially absorbed by Athletic. Oddly enough, his football counterpart, Juan Astorquia, also died in his youth, at the age of 29, just two years later, in 1905.
