= Manuel Castellanos (footballer) =

Spanish footballer

12th President of Athletic Bilbao
- In office 1929–1933
- Preceded by: Manuel de la Sota
- Succeeded by: José María Olabarria

Personal details
- Born: 1883 Bilbao, Spain
- Died: Unknown Bilbao, Spain
Association football career
- Full name: Manuel Ángel Juan Bautista de Castellanos Jacquet
- Position: Midfielder
Senior career*
Years	Team	Apps	(Gls)
1901–1902	Bilbao FC		
- * Club domestic league appearances and goals

Manuel Ángel Juan Bautista de Castellanos Jacquet was a Spanish engineer and footballer and the 12th president of Athletic Bilbao between 1929 and 1933. He still is the most successful president in the history of the club; under the guidance of Fred Pentland, Athletic won two La Liga titles and four Copa del Reys in his four years in office.

== Early life ==
Castellanos was born in 1883 in the Church of San Nicolás, Bilbao, as the son of a Mexican father, Manuel Herculano de Castellanos Marín (1856–?) and of Manuela Carlota Ignacia de Jacquet, a native of Madrid and the daughter of Carlos Hipólito Jacquet Saint-Mars, a wealthy banker of French origin, who established himself as a merchant in Bilbao in 1860 and who became the city's consul of France. He had an older brother Carlos (1881–1903), who became the first president of Bilbao FC, while one of his cousins, María Mestayer de Echagüe (1877–1949), known as "Maritxu", became the first gastronomic journalist in the Basque Country and probably in Spain.

Being the son of a well-off family in Bilbao, Castellanos was sent to Britain to complete his studies, where he developed a deep interest in football. While studying abroad, he used to spend the summers in his hometown, and like many other Balbainos, he began to play football games in the Hippodrome of Lamiako, which at the time was the home of organized football in Biscay. According with Manuel, his father, through a friend of his from a London Credit Bank, received some football boots that were then recreated by a local shoemaker named Germán Gómez: The first "Made in Spain" boots.

== Football career ==
In the late 1890s, Castellanos became a member of an informal group led by his brother Carlos, the so-called Bilbao Football Club, the first entity to play football in Bilbao since the disappearance of Club Atleta. During his brother's comings and goings to the United Kingdom, he had the opportunity to learn first-hand about the successful growth of professional football, and so, through the correspondence he maintained with Manuel, he recommended him the convenience of becoming a club, and thus, on 30 November 1900, Bilbao Football Club was officially established in an informal meeting held in the house of industrialist José Luis de Villabaso, who knew his father Manuel Castellanos since at least 1891 when they were members in the first board of directors of Banco del Comercio.

At the end of 1901, the two most important clubs in the city were Bilbao FC and Athletic Club, thus developing a rivalry between them, as they played several friendlies at the Hippodrome of Lamiako, which the two teams shared since there were hardly any fields in Bilbao at the time, and Castellanos played as a midfielder the first game between the two sides taking place on 10 November 1901, ending in a goalless draw. Castellanos was thus part in what is now regarded as one of the first football rivalries in Spain, one that helped turn football into a mass phenomenon in Bilbao since their duels aroused great expectation.

His next and last appearance as a footballer came on 23 November 1902, which ended in an 0–1 loss to Athletic. A few months later, on 24 March 1903, Bilbao FC agreed at the General Meeting to dissolve the club, and its remaining members and associates were officially absorbed by their rival.

== Personal life ==
Castellanos was married twice, having at least three children with his first wife, José Maria (1909), Amelia Castellanos Ledo (1912), and Manuel (1914–1936). He then married for the second time with Laura Peña Arribas, 16 years his junior, and the couple had nine children, Carlos, Luis, Francisco, Rafael, Javier, Alfonso, Manuel (1936–?), Guillermo, and Laura Castellanos Peña, all of whom were born in the second third of the 20th century.

== Presidency of Athletic Bilbao ==
In 1929, Castellanos was elected as the 12th president of Athletic Bilbao, a position that he held for four years until 1933. Thanks in part to the great management of Fred Pentland, Castellanos became the most successful president in the history of the club, with two La Liga titles and four Copa del Reys in his four years in office.

The Castellanos surname continued to be linked to Athletic in the second generation through José María Castellanos, known as "Chitín" in the family, son of the president and a regular defender for Mr. Pentland until he hung up his shirt in 1934. He went on to become a Basque-Navarrese tennis champion for several years before dying of cancer. Another son, Manuel, was less fortunate; enlisted in the Spanish Civil War on the day nationalist troops entered Getxo, he perished on the front just 24 hours later, so his father named his next child after him.
