= Club Atleta de los Astilleros del Nervión =

Football club in Spain active between 1889 and 1894

- Nickname: English Colony Team of Bilbao
- Founded: December 1889; 132 years ago, as the Club Atleta de los Astilleros del Nervión
- Dissolved: 1894; 132 years ago
- Ground: Hippodrome of Lamiako
- Chairman: Enrique Jones Bird
Home colours

The Club Atleta de los Astilleros del Nervión (English: Athletic Club of the Nervión Shipyards) was a multi-sports club based in Nervión, Biscay, that mainly consisted of the British workers of the Nervión Shipyards, hence its name, but sometimes also with players hailing from all across Bilbao. It was one of the first companies dedicated to sports in the region, most notably, football, having a section dedicated to the said sport due to its rapid growth in England. In addition to football, Club Atleta also performed in other modalities such as athletics, cricket, and cycling, although they also practiced others such as rugby, rowing and tug of war.

This entity is best remembered for its pioneering role in the amateur beginnings of football in the Basque Country, organizing the first known football match in the Basque Country on 4 April 1890, between the Machinery Department (engineers) vs the Shipyard Workers. These football teams were scratch teams that existed between 1890 and 1894.

Club Atleta was the first to bring football to the region, and most notably, to Bilbao, a sport practically unknown in the city at the time, playing a prominent role in promoting the sport there as the Bilbainos who watched their matches fell in love with the game and soon the local population joined the game too, even challenging the British workers to a match in 1894. Despite its very short life, the football team of the Nervión Shipyards left a big mark in the history of Basque football, laying out the seeds from which Athletic Bilbao would be born in 1898.

== History ==
=== Background ===
Biscayan investor José María Martínez de las Rivas (1848–1913) and his brother, Francisco, together with an English shipowner and politician named Charles Mark Palmer (1822–1907) from Newcastle, won the contract for the construction of three battleships for the Navy in 1888, after beating several rivals in a competition. The newspaper that Rivas controlled (El Noticiero Bilbaíno) carried out a major campaign to influence the process. On 1 June 1889, the contract was signed, and on 30 October of the same year, the Martínez Rivas Palmer Collective Company was registered in the Bilbao Mercantile Registry, dedicated to shipbuilding for the State, as well as for individuals. More than four thousand workers worked in those shipyards that occupied an area of 58,084 square meters in Sestao (Vizcaya). Although based in Spain, there were between 200 and 500 British workers in the shipyards. The Nervión Shipyard's first work was the battleship María Teresa, launched on 30 August 1890. On 8 July 1891, the battleship Vizcaya was launched and on 4 October, the battleship Almirante Oquendo.

From then on, there were clashes between Martínez Rivas and Palmer, as well as controversies in the press about the situation of the shipyards and their viability. Finally, on 20 April 1892, the company suspended payments. This was followed by dismissals, which were followed by workers' protests, which were followed by bitter political controversies. As a result of all this, the Council of Ministers of 12 May 1892 ordered the apprehension of the Nervión Shipyards. The protest of the British workers compelled the State to keep Palmer as technical director, although most of them returned to Great Britain in 1894–1895. In 1896 the shipyards closed, and in November agreed to its dissolution and definitive liquidation.

After the Spanish–American War of 1898 (in which the three battleships built in the Nervión Shipyards would be sunk in Santiago de Cuba), and a long series of lawsuits and personal and political confrontations, they would re-open in 1900.

=== Origins ===
The English employees of the Nervión Shipyards, located in Sestao (Vizcaya), founded a multi-sports and recreational club called Club Atleta, to keep their numerous British workers entertained and distracted, because indeed, for these workers sport meant a distraction from the pessimism of those turbulent years, with epidemics of smallpox and other diseases, social protests, and economic and political crises. For that group of Britons in Vizcaya, the Club Atleta constituted a necessary escape valve, becoming their best source for escapism. This large ex-pat community from the UK was dedicated to the practice of several of their sports, as well as to celebrate parties and events.

In 1889, Club Atleta formalized its first Board of Directors, with James S. Clark as president, John A. Mitchell and William Middleton as vice presidents, R. Brice as treasurer, William H. Calvert as secretary, and the son-in-law of Martínez Rivas, Don Adolfo de Urquijo e Ibarra, as honorary president. Henry V. Jones (also known as Enrique Jones Bird, since he converted to Catholicism in order to marry the Bilbao-born María Cerezo in 1886), would replace Calvert in the secretariat and on the sports organizing committee. He would be a vital character in the entity due to his authority over the Spanish.

Between 1889 and 1894, Club Atleta developed its sporting activity considerably. The most practiced sports by this group of workers were athletics, cricket, and cycling, although they also practiced others such as rugby, rowing, and tug of war, and of course, football, since they had in their ranks numerous footballers and ex-footballers, practically all Scottish.

=== First football match ===
The first news of the practice of football within the entity dates back to 4 April 1890, with a football match between members of the Club Atleta: the Machinery Department (engineers) vs the Shipyard Workers. The teams were mostly made-up of Scottish, mostly from Glasgow and its surroundings), and this is why the Scottish newspaper Glasgow Evening Post was the one who echoed the news that came from Spain about this group of football pioneers, rather than the Spanish newspapers who were mostly still ignorant about the sport. A month later, specifically on 3 May 1890, the Glasgow Post published a report about the game that detailed the aspects of the game, including lineups, the color of the clothes, and the result, and which goes as follows: "The aforementioned company – El Nervión – has a number of football and cricket players among its employees, so a group called Club Atleta was formed. They organized a match between the British employees of the company, to be held at the Hippodrome, at eleven o'clock. Being a splendid day, there was a huge turnout of Brits and natives, who seemed to really enjoy the game, and gave the players a lot of encouragement. The Machinery Department, winning the toss, chose to defend the east goal. The game for the first fifteen minutes was very even, but the shipyard team, which has been playing here for some time, gradually came out on top, winning by 8 goals to 1".

Machinery Department: James D. Weir (South-Western); George Baird (Vale of Leven) and James Mitchell (Kyles); W. Robertson, D. Crawford and Hugh Black (Glasgow Thistle); Fred Gunn (West Gurton), M. McFadzean (Kilmarnock); Thomas Hume (Port-Glasgow Athletic); George Pennycook (Whitefield) and J. Jaye (Glasgow). Shipyard workers: P. Preston (Barrow-in-Furness); D. Taylor (Partick Thistle) and James Foster (Blairvaddick); M. Davies (Scotstounhill); Habbieck (Partick Thistle) and B. McKeown (Scotstounhill); A. Beattie and D. Robb (Barrow-in-Furness); Ormonde (Newcastle), Bennett (Fleetwood Rangers) and J. Beattie (Barrow-in-Farness). Some of the players of Club Atleta were football players with a long career in numerous teams, such as the Beattie brothers, who had played football in their homeland, and Angus Beattie even had an interesting football career behind him in Scotland, Ireland and England. Moreover, one of the players (Thomas Hume) came from a team called Port Glasgow Athletic, because Scottish clubs linked to players of this new entity had the expression "Athletic" in their names.

Moreover, the Glasgow report said: “It was the Astillero team that actually played the first game in Spain (about six months ago), and not the Seville team.” They alluded to the match between Sevilla FC and Recreativo de Huelva, played at the Tablada Hippodrome in Seville) on 8 March 1890, a match that another Scottish newspaper (The Dundee and Angus Courier) described as “the first football match in Spain”, and stated, incorrectly, that Club Atleta had already played a football match in October or November 1889, shortly after the Martínez Rivas & Palmer Society was created. This statement came as a result of a healthy rivalry between the Scottish communities in Spain about which of them was the first to create a team and play football.

=== Golden age ===
Club Atleta continued with its events and activities, but its football matches between the machine departments (engineers) and the shipyards were slow to reappear in the press. On 12 January 1891, another football match was held, taking place at the Hippodrome of Las Arenas, and was attended by a large number of the British residents there. The Machinery Department won the toss, choosing to defend the east goal, playing with the wind at their backs. The kick-off took place at half past two, and the Engine Department scored the first goal a minute after the start. Throughout this period they prevailed, and when it ended the Machinery Department was leading 3–0. The second period began, and the Shipyards team, now with the wind at their backs, played well, but they were unable to score until five minutes before the end, when they scored twice. The Machinery Department scored one in the second half, thus sealing a 4–2 win.

Machinery Department: Porter, Weir; Defenses, G. Baird and H. Black; Media, Rearey, Izatt and Haveron; Forwards, Gunn, Peannycook, Horn, Higgins and Kane. Shipyard Department Porter, Merchans; Defenses, Taylor and Foster; Media, Mills, Fennah and Hubbick; Forwards, A. Beattie, Robb, McColl, Bennett and J. Beattie.

In September and October 1891, the Club Atleta of the Nervión Shipyards organizes various sports events at the Hippodrome of Lamiako, with cycling events, athletics (races, jumps), cricket, sack races, and “game of strength”, an archaic tug of war that was contested between the workers of the Machinery workshop and those of the Shipyard, limited to two groups of six people from each department, which was the only modality limited to Spanish citizens, as the others were open to everyone. Direct competition between the Machinery Department and the Shipyards was repeated, thus developing a rivalry that was not exempt from social components: An elitist machinery department, with engineers, university students, versus a team from the shipyards, made up of manual workers. As expected, the “game of strength” competition was won by the Shipyard Team, led by Luis Guistra. Among the winners of these tests were several British surnames (Harcot, Armstrong, Officer, Dobbie, Freeman, Brand, Beattie), as well as a Spanish surname, a certain A. Soriano, the third classified in several cycling tests. On 27 August 1892, the secretary of the Club Atleta, Henry (“Enrique”) Jones Bird, organized another series of sporting events: velocipede races, foot races, obstacle races, donkey races and sack races, with significant cash prizes.

As Club Atleta had no rivals in the city, the only matches they played against other teams were the ones where they faced English sailors who came to Bilbao in MacAndrews ships or crews of English ships who had set sail from Portsmouth and Southampton carrying miners, engineers and coal from the north-east of England. These miners, who had only seen the sea for the previous week, were desperate to leave the ships and find a patch of grass to play their favorite sports. The ships would enter the estuary of the Nervión river and dock next to the iron factories of the Nervión shipbuilding yards. Their football games were held on the quay next to the riverbank (the quay ran along the left bank of Nervión), also known as La Campa de los Ingleses, earning its name from the fact that this quay housed a British cemetery from the 17th century until 1908. In addition to the cemetery, the quay was at one point used as a runway for aeroplanes, but most importantly, it became a makeshift football pitch in the late 19th century. Local newspapers report several of these encounters, especially against the crew of the British Royal Navy. Those first meetings ended up promoting what would later become the sport of football in the city and in the country.

By 1892 the sheer quantity of Englishmen playing football on La Campa de los Ingleses meant that they had to move to another pitch that could properly accommodate the growing population of Brits. On 18 November 1892, the secretary of Club Atleta, Enrique Jones Bird, requested in writing to the Civil Government and the mayor of Leioa for permission to use the Lamiako Hippodrome as a football pitch from November to April (at the time, football was only played in the winter while cricket was the sport that occupied the summer). Permission was duly granted when the Civil Government authorized Club Atleta to play matches in Lamiako during "the entire football season", from 8 December to April 1 (actually, it ended on 2 February) and thus, the Hippodrome of Lamiako became the new home of organized football in the Basque Country, holding matches between Bird's club and a new company, the Bilbao Football Club, which was also made up of British residents in the region, but not linked to the shipyards, such as Alfred Mills.

The first match between Club Atleta and Bilbao FC was played on 1 November 1892, a meeting that gathered a significant number of attendees, with gentlemen having to pay one peseta to sit in preference and two reales to be in general admission, while ladies had free admission. Local newspapers report several meetings between these two sides, and there is even evidence of a "serious" tournament in the winter of 1892–93, which was played in Lamiako between a team from the Club Atleta (probably a combination of the best players from each department) and Bilbao FC. The tournament was won by Club Atleta on 22 April 1893, and its members received medals presented by James S. Clark.

Interest in the sport continued to grow among the local citizens, who swarmed Lamiako to watch teams the British workers and sailors challenge each other every weekend, and soon they picked up the sport themselves. In the spring of 1894, a group of young Bilbainos was brave enough to challenge the British to a football match, which was held at the Lamiako Hippodrome on 3 May 1894, and it ended in a comfortable 6–0 win for the British (mainly workers from the Nervión Shipyards), but most important than the result was its historical significance, as it was probably one of the first ‘international’ matches in the history of the sport.

== Decline and Collapse ==
In the autumn of 1894, coinciding with the closure of the Martínez Rivas & Palmer Company, most of the British workers returned to the United Kingdom, leaving Club Atleta at the hands of the Spanish, but without the British, the entity soon declined, collapsed and around 1894 this society, which was never officially established, seems to disappear.

The departure of the British from the Shipyards was followed by a period of some lack of interest in football, due to the lack of fields, goals, equipment, and the rudeness of its practice, with the local press even considering it more dangerous than Bullfighting. Similar phenomena occurred elsewhere in Spain where English (and especially Scottish) working communities founded football clubs in this period. They were a floating population and the sports clubs they founded disappeared with their departure.

== Legacy ==
The Club Atleta of the Nervión Shipyards was the first to bring football to the region, and most notably, to Bilbao, a sport practically unknown in the city at the time, and although the first games were only played by Britons, the local population began to join the games as well, and they even challenged the British, losing 6–0. The result, however, did not discourage the local population, who continued their newfound love affair with the British sport, and in fact, shortly after the match, some young people from the Zamacois Gymnasium in Bilbao, began to play football games in Lamiako, and in 1898, seven football enthusiasts belonging to the Zamacois gym founded Athletic Club, and two years later, the Bilbao Football Club was founded by several young Bilbao upper class who had studied in England and learned about football there, such as Carlos Castellanos and his brother Manuel. Despite sharing the name, the Castellanos Bilbao FC has no relationship with the Bilbao club that existed in 1892–93, formed by British.

== Notable players ==
- Angus McNichol Beattie (1861–1929): He was a remarkable right winger who before traveling to Biscay in November 1889, to work at the Nervión Shipyards, he had stood out for the English team at Barrow-in-Farness.
- George Baird: He was a defender, and later goalkeeper, who arrived at the Nervión Shipyards in October 1889, and played in the entity's first known football match on 4 April 1890 as well as in the challenge against the Spanish on 3 May 1894.
- James D. Weir: He was an engineer at the Clydebank shipyards (Scotland), he arrived at the Nervión Shipyards in October 1889, and played in the entity's first known football match on 4 April 1890 as a goalkeeper.

== Results ==
Club Atleta de Nervión

| 4 April 1890 | Machinery Department | 8 – 1 | Shipyard workers | Leioa, Basque Country |
| | ? James D. Weir; Baird, Mitchell; Robertson, Crawford and H. Black; Fred Gunn, McFadzean, Hume, Pennycook, J. Jaye | Report | ? P. Preston; Taylor, Foster; Davies, Habbieck, McKeown; A. Beattie, Robb, Ormonde, Bennett, J. Beattie | Stadium: Hippodrome of Lamiako |

| 12 January 1891 | Machinery Department | 4 – 2 | Shipyard workers | Leioa, Basque Country |
| | ? (1T) (1T) (1T) (2T) James D. Weir; Baird, H. Black; Rearey, Izatt and Haveron; Fred Gunn, Pennycook, Horn, Higgins, Kane | Report | ? 86' 89' Merchans; Taylor, Foster; Mills, Fennah and Habbieck; A. Beattie, Robb, McColl, Bennett, J. Beattie | Stadium: Hippodrome of Lamiako |

British workers

| 3 May 1894 | Bilbao students (Spain) | 0–5 (Note: The result is listed in some sources as having been a 0–6 win for the British.) | (United Kingdom) British workers | Leioa, Basque Country |
| International challenge | ? Borde, Alarcón, Lecue; Zabala, Milicua, Otero, Zubillaga, Unzueta, Azcue, San José and Greaves | Report1; Report2 | ? Baird, Hamilton, Wilson; McDonald, Rearey, Smeddon; Bell, Bruce, A. Roble, Armstrong and Brand | Stadium: Hippodrome of Lamiako; Attendance: 100 |
