= José Luis Gallegos =

Spanish businessman and sports leader

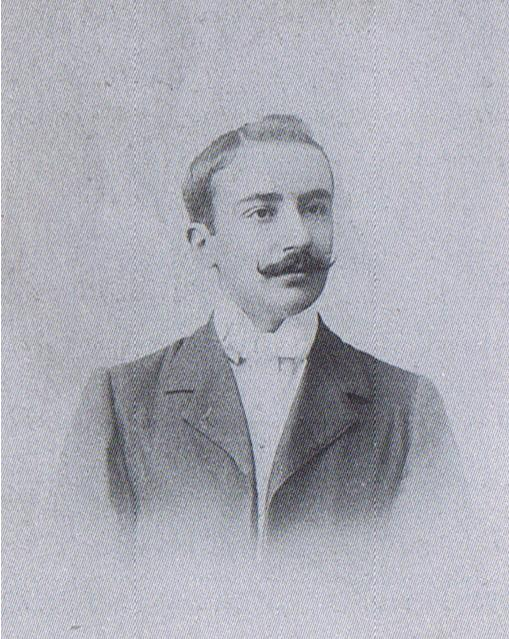
- José Luis Gallegos, second president of the Sevilla FC.
- Born: José Luis Gallegos Arnosa; 1880; Jerez de la Frontera, Andalusia, Spain
- Died: 1942 (aged 61-62); Seville, Spain
- Citizenship: Spanish
- Occupations: Sports leader; businessman
- Known for: Registering and presiding over Sevilla FC

President of Sevilla FC
- In office 1905–1908
- Preceded by: Edward F. Johnston
- Succeeded by: Carlos García Martínez

President of Sevilla FC
- In office 1913–1914
- Preceded by: José María Miró

José Luis Gallegos Arnosa (1880 – 1942) was a Spanish shipowner and commercial agent. He is widely regarded as one of the most important figures in the amateur beginnings of Sevilla FC, having been the fundamental head behind the registration of the club, which had been founded in 1890, in the Civil Registry of the province of Seville in 1905, thus finally making it an official football club, the first of such in the city of Seville. He then became the first official president of legalized Sevilla FC, a position that he held for three years between 1905 and 1908, and to which he returned on an interim basis on several occasions.

== Early life and education ==
Gallegos was born in 1880 in Jerez de la Frontera, Andalusia, as the son of Adolfo Gallegos, a winery foreman, and Petra Arnosa. He was the second of four children, including an older brother Adolfo who died at the age of 22, and two younger sisters, María and Petra. His fathers' work as an expert in wine production and cellar caretaker was recognized in Cádiz and also Seville, from where he received an important offer, so the family moved to there around the 1890s or at the beginning of the century. Although there is no exact information about the company that hired his father, it was most likely in the wine cellars and wine storage that had been recently set up by Francisco William Merry, and José Luis might have been introduced to football by a member of the Merry family, an ancient lineage of Irish origin.

His adaptation to the city was immediate, with the young Gallegos enjoying the singing cafés and music halls, which at that time were distributed throughout the city, but especially for the so-called Alameda de Hércules, a place for meetings and love dates. One of his great-grandsons described him as "a bit of a playboy who kept bad company in the Port of Seville", so his parents, who did not like the life that their young son was leading, decided to send him to Oxford in 1894, aged 14, to complete his training away from Seville. He then moved to Liverpool, where he trained as a commercial expert, a career that he would ultimately not pursue.

During his four-year stay in Great Britain, Gallegos became a polyglot due to his ease in the study of languages, so much so that he managed to learn English, French, and German in just four years there. In addition to languages, he also quickly learned how to play football, a sport that was booming in Great Britain at the time, becoming deeply interested in its regulations, and often attending the matches of the local clubs, such as Everton or Liverpool, the latter having been founded just a few years earlier in 1892. At the time, football was considered a mandatory subject in England, so he played several matches there, mostly for school teams.

== Life in Seville ==
In 1898, the 18-year-old Gallegos returned to Seville, (Note: Some sources wrongly state that he only returned in 1903, aged 23.) where he established himself as a ship consignee and customs agent in the port of Seville, a position that allowed him to build a close relationship with the various British merchants and sailors who docked there, such as the Englishmen Adam Wood, the captain of the Steamer Cordova, as well as several employees of the McAndrews shipping company and from other British companies established next to the Guadalquivir, such as Isaias White and the Welton brothers (Enrique and Carlos), with whom he played football in the Prado de San Sebastián. His position at the port also allowed him to meet various shipping businessmen, especially Edward F. Johnston, the British vice-council in Seville since 1879, and who had presided Sevilla FC in the early 1890s, as well as joining the Círculo Mercantil de Seville where he held various positions, including the head of its library section, and where he met some of the most notable residents of the city, such as José Montes Sierra, Federico de La Portilla, the banker Tomás de La Calzada, Manuel Aguilar, and Calixto Paz, with the latter two being presidents of Sevilla FC.

Gallegos returned to Seville with great knowledge about the sport of football, and thus he began organizing numerous meetings between the local youth, even giving classes on theories and rules to develop that game in Seville. Most of these matches were played in a closed corral at the La Trinidad glass factory, which was led by Rafael Giménez de Aragónguada, who would later join Sevilla FC in 1905. These matches were held almost clandestinely since this sport was persecuted by the municipal authorities not only because it was considered an unseemly activity in the traditional Sevillian society, but also because they were considered indecorous due to their clothing and noise.

At the end of 1904, however, Gallegos began promoting and championing this sport, more specifically in October 1904, when he, together with a group of young people, his friends Manuel Jiménez de León, Ángel Leániz, Tiburcio Alba, and Luis Ibarra among others, decided to begin the process of registering the Sevilla football club for three fundamental reasons: To give it a public character and put an end to clandestinity; to comply with the Royal Circular Order of 1902, which obliged associations to register in the Registry of Associations (previously it was not necessary); and to enable Sevilla FC to participate in the competitions that were beginning to be organized at the national level, such as the Copa del Rey, which had started in 1903. Gallegos was at the helm of this group of young enthusiasts because he was probably the only one who had reached the age of majority in Spain, which at the time was 25 years of age.

== Sporting career ==
=== Founding the Sevilla Football Club ===
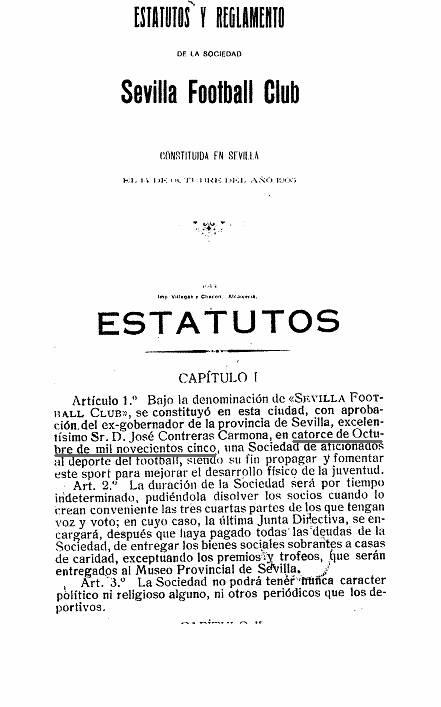
The first statutes of Sevilla Football Club, written by Gallegos.

Between October 1904 and January 1905, he created the club's new statutes, which were accepted by the civil governor José Contreras Carmona. (Note: Some sources state that this period of the club's history was presided by Calixto Paz, although such claims are still open to investigation.) The board of directors was subsequently elected on 23 September 1905, in which Gallegos was appointed president in a meeting of about forty members held at Tiburcio Alba's house on Génova Street. The club was then finally registered in the Registry of Associations on 14 October 1905, thus making Gallegos the official founder of legalized Sevilla and the first inspirer of the entity's statutes.

In the following day, he gave the famous founding speech during the dinner held at the Pasaje de Oriente, in which he stated that "All men of any social level, religious or political ideas will have a place here", and likewise, the club had been founded by several young enthusiasts from foreign lands, including Great Britain, such as Carlos Langdon, the Alba brothers (Tiburcio and Paco), Adam Wood, and John Mackenzie, others from Switzerland, such as the Zapata brothers (Manuel and Fermín) and Pepe Lafita, and even by Sevillians of French descent (Bezard). The club officially established its headquarters on Sierpes Street.

In this way, Gallegos reactivated Sevilla FC, since there is evidence that a football team with that name had already played in Seville between 1890 and 1893, which won the very first official football match in Spain against Recreativo de Huelva. Despite being a decade apart, both sides have members in common; for instance, one of the 1905 founders, Carlos Langdon, was the son of John Sydney Langdon, a founding member and doctor of the Sevilla FC of the 1890s. A further connection between these two sides was that figures of both eras appeared in 1913 to found the Club Náutico de Sevilla, such as Gallegos, Paco Alba, and Laffita from the 1905 side, and Enrique Welton and Isaias White from the 1890 side, with the latter having served as the club's first secretary. Likewise, it is likely that this group led by Gallegos took its inspiration for Sevilla FC from the 1890 model. In 1941, however, he stated that he was "completely unaware of the existence of that 1890 club", even though it had a president and a considerable degree of organization.

=== President of the Sevilla Football Club ===
The club was also known as Sociedad de Football until the beginning of the 1910s because at the time it was the only society dedicated to football in the city, and thus, they only resumed its name as Sevilla FC in 1908, after the creation of the Sevilla Balompié, a team founded by the sons of senior Sevillian soldiers of the time. In the autumn of 1905, the board of directors of Sevilla requested from the City Council a land known as the Huerto de la Mariana, which was located between the gardens of San Telmo and the Venta de Eritaña, in the place now occupied by the Plaza de América, for the practice of the club's sporting activities. Sevilla FC played on this field, which was good sept for a large tree that sometimes hindered the game, until the autumn of 1908, when the land was occupied by the Real Tennis Club. His position at the Círculo Mercantil, the place of refuge for many of the Sevilla members, proved to be decisive for Sevilla to play on the commercial field, located in the Prado of San Sebastián.

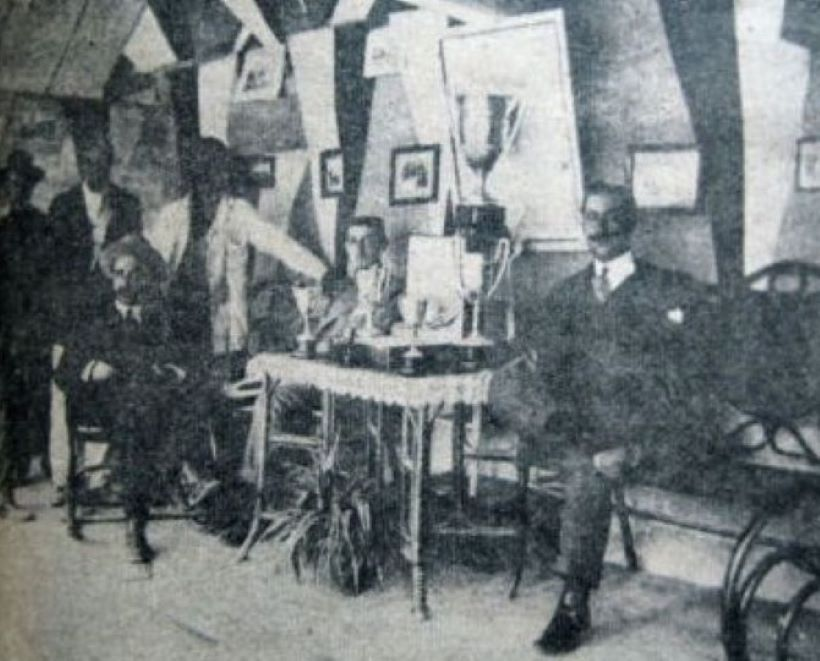
José Luís Gallegos, president of Sevilla, and Benito Romero, director and player, in a booth at the club's fair, displaying unidentified trophies.

Although the activity of the club decreased between 1906 and 1908 due to a lack of opponents, Gallegos kept organizing football matches between the club's members; however, due to not being of interest to the press, the details and frequency of these matches are unknown. At the end of 1908, the club already had more than 80 young people divided into different teams, which led to the first Sevillian derbies and tournaments. In a photo from April 1907, the Sevilla president Gallegos and Benito Romero, director and player, can be seen sitting comfortably in the club's fair booth, next to a table with seven club trophies, which have not yet been identified by modern historians, since the oldest trophy that the entity preserves is the 1912 Seville Cup. This booth was also displaying photos, plaques, and paintings, probably referring to the club, which still had just a little over a year.

In 1908, Gallegos contacted Hugh MacColl and Gilbert Pollock, two former Sevilla players who had settled in Sunderland, regarding the purchase of new red and white shirts based on Sunderland AFC for a charity match against Recreativo de Huelva, meant to help the victims of the bloody 1908 Messina earthquake; the two of them gladly provided these shirts for the equipment, tasking Adam Wood, one of Sevilla's British members and captain of the SS Cordova, with taking the shirts to Seville. Once he left the presidency in 1908, Gallegos continued to be closely linked to the club and even became interim president of the entity for a few months in 1909. Gallegos then had a second term between 11 October 1913 and January 1914, motivated by the departure of José María Miró. Years later, on 29 February 1914, in an interview with the local magazine El Fígaro, Gallegos stated that "the beginnings of 10 years ago were very difficult", being a very important contribution to the annals of Sevilla History. In 1941, he provided his valuable testimony for the first book of Sevilla history, published that year by the former Sevilla director Arturo Otero.

=== Other sports ===
In addition to football, Gallegos became the sports patron of the city, promoting all the sporting initiatives that arose in Seville, such as the aforementioned Club Náutico or Sociedad de Sport Sevillano, which never took off. Just like Johnston, Gallegos also briefly worked as a referee.

In 1906, Seville was visited by the Catalan sports journalist Narciso Masferrer, a very influential figure at the time, who wanted to inquire about the city's football activity, but Dr. Salvador López, who had developed football in the city through his position as a physical education teacher at the San Isidoro Institute, only mentioned a British group who had been playing in the Prado de San Sebastián since the turn of the century, thus completely ignoring Gallegos's Sevilla. Annoyed by this, Gallegos went on to pay him back in the same coin, when in 1914, in an interview with El Fígaro, he stated that there was no football in the city before 1904, thus disregarding all the work carried out by López; this quarrel lasted for several years.

== Personal life ==
Gallegos married Soledad Bellido Caro (1889–1980), with whom he had three daughters: María Luisa, Josefina, and María del Carmen. His home was located in the famous Tiro de Línea neighborhood, specifically, on Avenida de los Teatinos, number 40.

A religious man, Gallegos was linked to the Brotherhood of the Great Power of Seville and also to the Brotherhood of the Lord of Seville, where his first-born grandson was baptized in 1937.

== Death ==
A heavy smoker, Gallegos died in Seville in 1942, at the age of 62, as a result of a serious lung condition. One of his great-grandsons, Enrique Parrilla, founded the Seville-based technology company Lantia, which became an international reference in the publishing industry.
