= Isaiah White =

English engineer and businessman

- Born: Isaiah White Lewis; 11 June 1826; Forest of Dean, Gloucestershire, England
- Died: 24 March 1894 (aged 67); Seville, Spain
- Citizenship: English
- Occupations: Engineer; Businessman
- Known for: Founder of Portilla, White, y Cía
- Father: Isaias White Jr.

Isaiah White Lewis (11 June 1826 – 24 March 1894), known in Spain as Isaias White, was an English engineer and businessman who co-founded the Portilla Hermanos y White, later Portilla, White y Cia (1868–1896), one of the most important iron works in the city at the time.

== Early life and education ==
Isaiah White was born in Forest of Dean on 11 June 1826, as one of seven children from the marriage formed by George White, a carpenter, and Alice Lewis, and he was then baptized in the Littledean Parish Church.

== Engineering career ==
At the time of the 1841 United Kingdom census, he and his family had moved to Maesteg, Glamorganshire, where his two eldest brothers, John and George, worked as carpenters, while Thomas, William, Isaiah, and Isaac all worked as Engineers in the Maesteg Ironworks. Interestingly, his friend Jacob Chivers, who had also been born in the Forest of Dean and was only a year older than him, followed a similar career path, working as an engineer, but at the other ironworks in Maesteg, the Cambrian Iron and Spelter Works. Like many other ironworks engineers, White and Chivers heard about the opportunities in Spain from the sailors of those ships docking at Porthcawl loaded with metals from Spain, such as copper, for processing in Wales, and who then returned with loads of Welsh coal, which was cheaper to mine in Wales and transport rather than use the then expensive local coal.

When the Maesteg ironworks closed down in 1848, White, Chivers, and a few others decided to take the five-day steamer journey to Cartagena, a fortified seaport in South East Spain, with Chivers's daughter Elizabeth being already born in Cartagena in 1848. They initially worked as clerks, but while Chivers went on to make his fortune after purchasing a lead mine near Cartagena, White eventually moved to Seville in 1855, aged 29.

== Business career ==
In the mid-1850s, White partnered with Adolfo Corvelo, who had offices at Plaza de Villasis, and together, they ran a Shipping Company that only had one steamship, the flagship Adela, named after his late daughter, who died in infancy. A few years later, he associated himself with the Portilla family, Indians who, after the independence processes of the American territories, had to abandon those lands, eventually settling in Seville with a large amount of capital from the New World, and their partnership resulted in the creation of Portilla y White with offices near Plaza de Armas. During this period, he was recurring a client of Richard Edwards, the owner of the well-known premises Lliw Forge Manufactory situated in the Parish of Llandeilo, requesting several orders for Portilla y White, such as connecting rods, cranks, and crossheads, some of whom were said to be for gunboats for the Spanish Navy. In the mid-1860s, his older brother Thomas decided to follow in his footsteps by moving to Spain, and therefore, his second son George Henry was born at Plaza de Armas in Seville on 3 October 1865.

The company was thus renamed Portilla Hermanos y White, but the company was dissolved after the general crisis of 1866, and as the business was prosperous, the Portilla family decided to invest and was able to recover a large part of the shares that it had handed over to the creditors due to the crisis of 1866. The Portilla White y Cía was thus established on 30 November 1868, and the majority of its capital, some 10.6 million reales, belonged to the creditors of the previous company, whose assets and liabilities were transferred to the new company, and the creditors of the old company became shareholders of the new one, which resumed the manufacture and sale of boilers and steam engines for ships, as well as oil mills, agricultural machinery, and metal constructions, eventually becoming "one of the most important mechanical engineering and metal construction companies in Spain in the second half of the 19th century".

In April 1876, Portilla White y Ciá was commissioned by the Algeciras City Council to carry out the project of building an iron installation in Algeciras, which would serve as a fish market. They were then commissioned to build a similar one in Seville, with the work being completed in 1883 under the direction of the municipal architect José Sáenz López. This building was designed to house the Seville Fish Market, thus fulfilling the request of the fishermen of Ayamonte to the Seville City Council made in 1854 to prepare a space for the sale and contracting of fish, and it is popularly known as the Market or Naves del Barranco.

In August 1886, the Ministry of the Navy was authorized to purchase 85 cannons and 97 mounts for them, and after several projects were presented, it was Portilla Withe y Cía who was awarded the contract, thus opening the so-called Portilla & White cannon workshop in Seville. In 1888, Queen Isabel II visited Seville and toured the new facilities of the Portilla & White company, which had been expanded to manufacture steel cannons, and she was pleasantly surprised to find out that the word “London” did not appear on the steam engines, as they had been made with Spanish capital and resources.

== Social and sporting career ==
In addition to the metallurgical foundry of Portilla & White of the brothers Thomas and Isaías White Lewis, several other British companies established themselves in Seville during the 19th century, such as the Scottish shipping company MacAndrews, founded by Robert MacAndrew; the Compañía de Agua de los Ingleses directed by Charles Arthur Friend, the Seville Tramways Company controlled by John Braick, and also Juan Cunningham, one of the pioneers of the transport of Seville oranges to England, and the Irish-born Cádiz native William MacPherson, a key figure of the Industrial Revolution in the city, and all of them make up the British colony of Seville, which in its days off was dedicated to cricket or rowing, a summer sport for which they founded the Club de Regatas de Sevilla in 1875. The oldest account of a sporting activity made by him can be found in 1878 aboard the Macareno boat, being a member of the crew along with Welton, Niño, Edward F. Johnston, who won a regattas held on the Guadalquivir, next to Tablada, in honor of the Spanish royal family, who was visiting Seville.

== Personal life and death ==
In the mid-1860s, White married Maraquita (Maria) Luisa Méndez Montes, and the couple had six children, but only one son, Isaias White Jr., who went on to become a crucial piece in the foundation of Seville FC, along with his co-workers Hugh MacColl, the technical manager of the Portilla White foundry, and Gilbert Pollock.

In the General Census of the Population of Seville in August 1875, the 48-year-old White appears married to María Luisa Méndez.

White died in Seville on 24 March 1894, at the age of 67.
