= Enrique Welton =

Spanish footballer

Personal information
- Full name: Enrique Welton Niño
- Place of birth: Seville, Spain
- Position(s): Forward

Senior career*
Years	Team	Apps	(Gls)
1890–1892	Sevilla FC	+3	(+0)
- * Club domestic league appearances and goals

Enrique Welton Niño was an English footballer who is widely regarded as one of the most important figures in the amateur beginnings of Sevilla FC, being one of its founders in 1890, as well as one of its first players, featuring in the first official football match in Spain.

== Early life ==
Enrique Welton was born in Seville as the son of Josefa Niño, a native of Triana, and George William Welton, an English chemist by profession who owned a small shop on Calle San Jacinto. He had a brother named Carlos.

Their father was also a member of the Círculo Mercantil de Sevilla ("Commercial Circle of Sevilla"), and together with Edward F. Johnston, a fellow British emigrant, they instilled sport as a recreational means in the Spanish members of Círculo, thus eventually creating the Club de Regatas de Sevilla in 1875, a sailing club whose skiffs soon began crossing the Guadalquivir. This club had both Spanish and British members, but it was the latter group who was the driving force of the club, since some of them had to instruct the Spaniards in the handling of skiffs, with Welton remaining one of the club's most active members until 1883, when it disappeared.

== Sporting career ==
=== Early years ===
During his youth, the Welton brothers practiced rowing and regattas with their friend and neighbor Isaias White, who had also been born in Seville to English parents, so despite being Spanish by birth, they all received a typically English education, thus being familiarized with the practice of football, so much so that in the late 1880s, they decided to create a football team made up of Seville residents.

White worked at his father's foundry, Portilla y White, and as such, he knew some of the British employees of the Seville Water Works Company Limited, so White and the Welton brothers recruited some of them to their new football team. They began to play football at the Hipódromo de Tablada (horse racing track) around the autumn of 1889, since football was a winter sport at the time, but finding 22 individuals (plus the referee) proved to be an impossible task, given that the expatriates came to work and many of them had positions of responsibility. Furthermore, football was a sport practically unknown in the city, so the only sportsmen who knew its rules were of Anglo-Saxon nationality, and thus, unlike the sailing clubs, White's football club only had foreigners, which is why its legalization in Spain never came to fruition, and soon this society, which was never officially established, seems to disappear in that same year.

=== Sevilla FC ===
On 25 January 1890, White and the Welton brothers were among the Seville residents of British origin who founded Sevilla FC, which thus became the second-oldest football club in history, and the oldest one exclusively dedicated to football. Unlike his brother Carlos, Enrique was one of the eleven footballers who started in Sevilla's first serious match, a friendly against a Recreation Club 80 miles away based in Huelva, the so-called Recreativo de Huelva, on 8 March 1890, at the Hipódromo de Tablada in Seville, helping his side to a historic 2–0 victory; this is now considered the first official football match in Spain. (Note: Some sources wrongly claim that both brothers played in this match.)

Together with White and Hugh MacColl, the technical manager of the Portilla White foundry, Enrique was one of Sevilla's main promoters from 1890 to 1892. On 20 February 1892, he lined up for Sevilla as a forward in a friendly against Recreativo, playing alongside Lindberg brothers (Hanaldo and Juan), Edward MacAndrews, and Félix Vázquez de Zafra, the latter being originally a member of the Huelva club; Sevilla lost 2–0. During the celebrations of the fourth centenary of the Discovery of America by Christopher Columbus in October 1892, the Welton brothers started in a match against Huelva for the so-called Copa del la Raza, during which one of the brothers fell to the ground unconscious after a kick in the stomach by Huelva's Pepe Garci. Some sources state that it was Enrique, others that it was Carlos, but all agree that their mother, Josefa Niño, "upset with a blow they had given to his son, rushed onto the pitch chasing Garci with a fan in an attempt to hit him", which means that Huelva was also the birthplace of the first picturesque known assault on a football field.

In the absence of rivals, Welton and White would play other sports, such as rowing, but the lack of opponents was such that Sevilla eventually faded away.

=== Later career ===
It was not until 1905, that the club was reactivated by José Luis Gallegos, who was helped to do so by White and Welton brothers, who were among the few of the original group who participated in the creation of both teams. In 1913, Gallegos, White, and the Welton brothers came together again to create another club, this time the Club Náutico de Sevilla.
