= Isaias White =

Spanish footballer

Personal information
- Full name: Isaias White Méndez
- Date of birth: 2 June 1869
- Place of birth: Seville, Spain
- Date of death: 16 June 1914 (aged 45)
- Place of death: Seville, Spain
- Position: Forward

Senior career*
Years	Team	Apps	(Gls)
1890–1893	Sevilla FC	3	(+1)
- * Club domestic league appearances and goals

Isaías White Méndez (2 June 1869 – 16 June 1914) was an English / Spanish footballer who is widely regarded as one of the most important figures in the amateur beginnings of Sevilla FC, being one of its founders in 1890, and then serving the club as its first secretary, from which he organized the first official football match in Spain, where he scored a goal to help Sevilla become the first team in Spanish football history to win an official match.

== Early life ==
Isaias White was born in Seville on 2 June 1869, as the fourth child and only son of Maria Méndez Montes and Isaiah White Lewis, and was baptized on 12 June of that year in the parish church of San Vicente in Seville. His father was an English engineer from Gloucestershire and co-owner of the Portilla, White, y Cía, which was "one of the most important mechanical engineering and metal construction companies in Spain in the second half of the 19th century".

In the 1891 General Census of the Population of Seville (padrón), a year after the founding of Sevilla FC, Isaias is listed as 21 years old and living with his parents and sisters in Calle Bailen 41, in the San Vicente neighbourhood of Seville. The house still exists, but has since been renumbered, making this the first home of Sevilla FC. In the padrón men between 21 and 40 are required to list their military service, and in this section, the word ‘Ingles’ (English) has been added. Despite being a Sevillano by birth, as his father was English and under the British Nationality Act 1772, children born abroad were considered British even if the father alone was British.

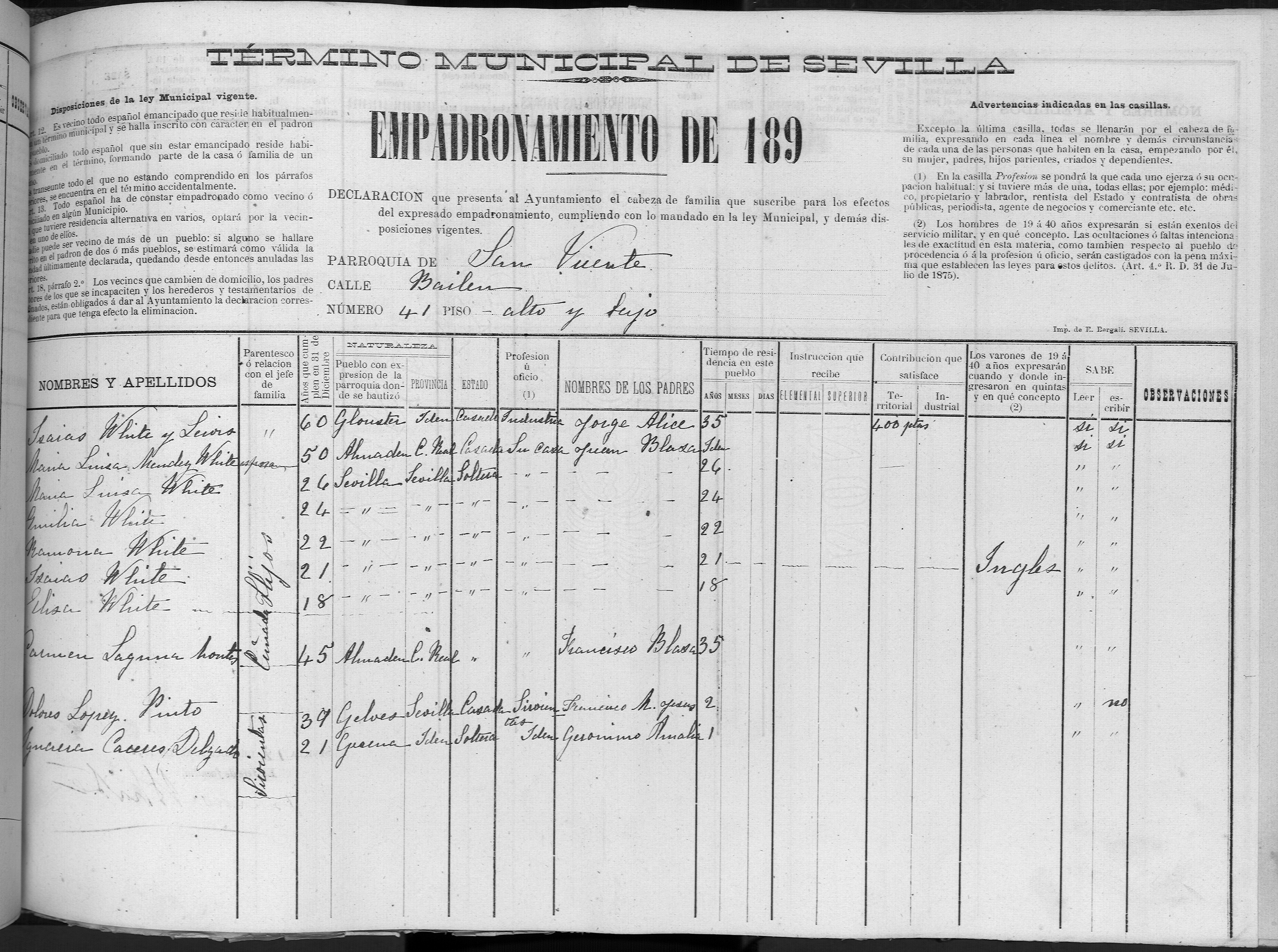
1891 General Census of the Population of Seville (padrón), a year after the founding of Sevilla FC

== Sporting career ==
=== Early years ===
During his youth, White practiced rowing and regattas with his friends, the Welton brothers (Enrique and Carlos), who had also been born in Seville to English parents, so they all enjoyed dual nationality. They practiced those sports at the Club de Regatas de Sevilla, founded in 1875 by members of the British colony of Seville, including his father, George William Welton, and Edward F. Johnston, who had become the British vice-council in Seville in 1879. In the late 1880s, he began working in his father's company, one of Spain's largest foundries, which was located on Arjona Street in Seville, where he had personal contact with a plurality of people from different places, including sailors and merchants from Great Britain, who were the ones to introduce him to the sport of football, since his father had left England in 1848, a time when football had not yet fully kicked-off in the country. After watching a few matches between the different crews of British ships, White decided to create a football team made up of Seville residents, and the first people that he recruited were the Welton brothers.

As part of his job at the foundry, White had sometimes worked with the British employees of the Seville Water Works Company Limited, also known as "the water of the English", which in 1883, had built the water extraction wells in Alcalá de Guadaira, a town that had two flour mills, both owned by the Portilla & White foundry, so he took advantage of this connection to meet and recruit some British members from this company for the new sports society. They began to play football at the Hipódromo de Tablada (horse racing track) around the autumn of 1889, since football was a winter sport at the time, but finding 22 individuals (plus the referee) proved to be an impossible task, given that the expatriates came to work and many of them had positions of responsibility. Furthermore, football was a sport practically unknown in the city, so the only sportsmen who knew its rules were of Anglo-Saxon nationality, and thus, unlike the sailing clubs, White's football club only had foreigners, which is why its legalization in Spain never came to fruition, and soon this society, which was never officially established, seems to disappear in that same year.

=== Founding Sevilla FC ===
On 25 January 1890, White, together with some of his waterworks co-workers and fellow Seville residents of British origin, attended an old café to mark the traditional Scottish celebration of Burns Night. That same evening, after consuming some beers and becoming concerned about their physical health and lifestyle, they began discussing the proposal of forming an Athletics Association, but after much discussion, they instead founded Sevilla FC to organize football matches regularly in order to exercise and feel more at home. To that end, they drew up the rough articles and the constitution of Sevilla FC, doing it so while in a drunken state. White was elected as the club's first-ever secretary, while his colleague Hugh MacColl, the technical manager of the Portilla White foundry, was named captain, and Edward Johnston as president. Sevilla thus became the second-oldest football club in history, and the oldest one exclusively dedicated to football.

=== First official match in Spain ===
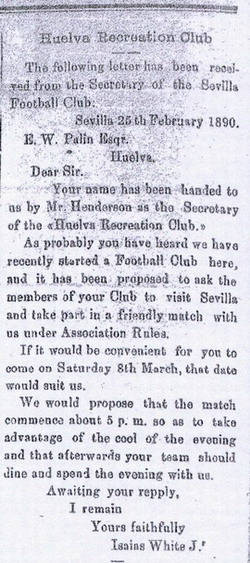
Letter written on 25 February 1890 by the secretary of the Sevilla Football Club (Isaiah White) proposing to the secretary of the Huelva Recreation Club (Edward Palin) to play a friendly football match.

Wasting no time, Sevilla FC began organizing several "kickabout" matches between the club's members in a close by racecourse, where White and the others would set up goalposts to play 70-minute five-a-side matches on Sundays, which at the time was a non-working day, although MacColl and the others were able to persuade their bosses to give them Saturday afternoons off. On 25 February 1890, White, as secretary of Sevilla, wrote the now infamous letter in which he invented Recreativo Huelva, a Recreation Club 80 miles away based in Huelva, to play a match on Saturday 8 March 1890, at the Hipódromo de Tablada in Seville. The players were all British-born, mostly Scottish, except for two Spaniards on each team, Huelva's Duclós and Soto, and Sevilla's Mandy and White, who that day played alongside captain MacColl, and together, they helped Sevilla to a historic 2–0 victory, thus becoming the first team in Spanish football history to win an official match.

The author of the second goal was a certain "Clown Yugles", nicknamed so for stepping onto the pitch in a nightdress "in the shape of a fantastically patterned suit of pyjama". The newspapers of the time do not reveal his identity, but it mentioned that he is from "our left-wing", and according with Sevilla's future line-ups against Huelva in the next two years, White and one of the Welton brothers were the only players who started in both this match and then featured as left-wingers around that time (at the time, there was no such thing as wing-backs). White was the richest individual of the Sevilla squad, thus having a higher chance of being the one who usually sleeps in a fancy pyjama than not, and despite being mocked with waves of laughter for showing up with such clothes, it was him who had the last laugh, scoring his side's second goal. After the match, Sevilla marked this historic occasion by holding a large banquet in the saloon of a Suizo restaurant, where "Clown Yugles" was further mocked after falling off his chair. They also toasted the Queen of England and the boy king, Alfonso XIII.

=== Later career ===
Together with White and Hugh MacColl, the technical manager of the Portilla White foundry, Enrique was one of Sevilla's main promoters from 1890 to 1892. Sevilla and Huelva kept facing each other in the early 1890s, home and away, in which White played alongside fellow Portilla White co-worker, Gilbert Pollock, who scored the first-ever away goal on Spanish soil, as well as the Lindberg brothers (Hanaldo and Juan), Edward MacAndrews, and Félix Vázquez de Zafra, the latter being originally a member of Recreativo de Huelva. On 20 February 1892, he started for Sevilla as a forward in a friendly against Recreativo, which ended in a 2–0 loss. In the absence of teams to play against, Welton and White would play other sports, such as rowing, but the lack of opponents was such that Sevilla eventually faded away. It was not until 1905, that the club was reactivated by José Luis Gallegos, who was helped to do so by White and Enrique Welton, who were among the few of the original group who participated in the creation of both teams.

== Later life ==
Following his father's death in 1894, the 25-year-old White took over the family business. He died in 1914, at the age of either 44 or 45.
