= José Montes Sierra =

Spanish banker and politician

- Born: 22 January 1846; Alhama de Granada, Spain
- Died: 2 May 1918 (aged 72); Seville, Spain
- Citizenship: Spanish
- Occupations: Merchant; lawyer; Banker; Politician; Sports leader
- Known for: 2nd president of the Royal Andalusian Football Federation
- Political party: Republican Union

Círculo Mercantil de Seville
- In office 1886–1890
- Succeeded by: Pedro Lázaro Sánchez

Círculo Mercantil de Seville
- In office 1893–1898
- Preceded by: Pedro Lázaro Sánchez

Círculo Mercantil de Seville
- In office 1900–1918

2nd president of the Royal Andalusian Football Federation
- In office 1915–1917

José Montes Sierra (22 January 1846 – 2 May 1918) was a Spanish lawyer, merchant, banker, and politician during the Bourbon restoration, leader of the Republican Union in Seville and a member of the Spanish parliament in several legislatures.

== Early life and education ==
José Montes Sierra was born in a large house on the Guillen Street in Alhama de Granada on 22 January 1846, (Note: Some sources wrongly claim that he was born in 1850.) as the son of Magdalena Sierra and Antonio Lino Montes, the mayor of Alhama. He grew up surrounded by family, including his parents and his three brothers.

Due to his intelligence, dedication, and academic prowess, Montes Sierra became an officer at the Provincial Finance Administration of Granada in 1864, and by the end of the same year, he was appointed as the special auditor for Mines in Granada, a position he held until late 1865, when he shifted his focus to law, driven by an interest in business and commerce. A few years later, in 1873, he was among the several people from Alhama who accompanied his brother Nicasio to Havana, where they lived for two years, during which Nicasio served as aide-de-camp to General Joaquín Jovellar Soler, who later became President of Cuba's Government in 1875. After holding various public administrative positions in the Treasury Delegation of Granada, he spent some time in both Cuba and the United States before returning to Spain in 1875. That same year, he settled in Seville, where he married Ana Huidobro y Prieto, the daughter of a prominent Andalusian banker, thus taking over his banking firm Hijos de PL Huidobro ("Children of PL Huidobro").

== Sporting career ==
After graduating in law, Montes Sierra became a lawyer, and also a merchant, and as such, he soon became a member of the Círculo Mercantil de Seville, which he presided for four years between 1886 and 1890. During this period, some of its British members, such as Edward F. Johnston and George William Welton, instilled sport as a means for recreational activity among the Spanish members of Círculo, which eventually gave rise to several sporting organizations, such as Sevilla FC in January 1890. Montes Sierra himself was fond of recreation, so he participated in the birth of some of these entities; for instance, it was him who carried out the task of the constitution of Sevilla FC, and he was also one of the interlocutors who facilitated the dispute of matches between Sevilla and Recreativo de Huelva, since he was the president of Compañía Anónima de las Minas de El Castillo de Las Guardas (CAMCG), a company located near Minas de Riotinto.

In 1905, Montes Sierra helped José Luis Gallegos to reactivate Sevilla FC and officially establish it. Thanks to his influence at the Seville City Council, the club was able to secure a plot of land in the Prado de San Sebastián, which was used to establish the Campo del Mercantil, and his influence at Círculo Mercantil allowed this society to make its booth available to Sevilla, which was used as a locker room for its squad in the Mercantil field, officially inaugurated on 1 January 1913.

Montes Sierra's long-standing association with Sevilla FC, which dated back to 1890, earned him the club's honorary vice-presidency in 1914, a position that paved the way for him to become president of the newly established Federación Regional del Sur in 1915. In 1917, Montes Sierra stepped down from this position due to the illness that killed him the following year.

== Professional career ==
At some point in the early 1890s, Montes Sierra became the president of the Compañía de Navegación del Guadalquivir, a company whose operational base was the Port of Seville, which allowed him to strengthen his ties with the influential British shipping company, and its owner Johnston, the president of Sevilla FC and the British vice-consul in Seville. Together with one of his sons, he later took charge of the Compañía Naviera Sevillana, and in 1907 the Compañía Naviera de Navegación a Vapor (CNNV). He also participated in private banking, being a director of the branch of the Bank of Spain in Seville.

Montes Serra had a very prolific social life in Seville, holding several prominent positions in the Sevillian society, many of them at the same time and others alternately, such as president of the CAMCG, the CNNV, and advisor to the Bank of Spain, positions he held until his death, as well as president of the Ateneo de Sevilla, the Sociedad Económica de Amigos del País, the Sociedad Excursionista, and of the Junta de Obras del Puerto de Sevilla. He also alternated his presidency at Círculo Mercantil with that of the Chamber of Commerce, Industry, and Navigation of Seville, which he had co-founded in April 1886, being then elected as its first vice-president, a position that he only held for a few days since he then replaced Tomás de la Calzada as the entity's new president. He remained as such for two years, until 1888, and again between 1890 and 1893, and in the mid-time, he presided over Círculo from 1888 to 1890, when he resigned following a struggle to take control of the Port of Seville, and again between 1893 and 1898, when he was replaced by Pedro Lázaro Sánchez, and one last time in 1900, and this time, he remained in office for 18 years until he died.

== Political career ==
In 1903, the 57-year-old Montes Sierra became the founding president of the Republican Union, which operated until 1910, when internal disputes led to its dissolution. During the Bourbon restoration, he was elected as a Republican deputy to the Spanish Cortes for Seville on five occasions, specifically in 1905, 1907, 1910, 1916, and 1918, although he was barely able to carry out the office on the latter occasion due to a serious illness that caused his death two months later on 2 May 1918, at the age of 72. His brother, Nicasio Montes, had also represented the Electoral District of Alhama as a deputy to the Cortes in 1893, 1898, and 1903, while his nephew, Joaquín Montes-Jovellar, also served as a deputy from 1918 for the Electoral District of Alhama, a position he held ten times until the dictatorship of Primo de Rivera in 1923.

In an interview with the French newspaper Le Figaro in 1914, Montes Sierra stated that "I could have made the party in Seville take a path of open rebellion, but I judged that it was not humane to fill the prisons with sterile sacrifices, while the population required our participation in a common work of progress".
