= John Sydney Langdon =

Gibraltarian medical doctor

- Born: 1854; Gibraltar
- Died: 1899 (aged 44–45); Seville, Spain
- Citizenship: British
- Occupations: Medical doctor; Referee

John Sydney Langdon (1854–1899) was a Gibraltarian medical doctor who played a crucial role in the amateur beginnings of Sevilla CF, being one of its founders in 1890, and then serving the club as its first-ever doctor, and even as a linesmen in the first official football match in Spain.

== Career ==
John Sydney Langdon was born in Gibraltar in 1854, as the son of an English soldier, and in the early 1870s, the teenage Langdon and his brother William most likely participated in the football matches organized by the British colony of Gibraltar, and even in a few friendlies against neighboring local teams of La Línea and San Roque in Cádiz. At some point in the mid-1870s, the Langdon brothers left Gibraltar, but while William went to Huelva as an executive of the Río Tinto Company, John, then a young doctor, settled at number 9 calle Don Remondo in Seville with his young French wife, and the couple only had one son, Charles Gustave, known in Spain as Carlos Gustavo, born in 1887. At some point before his death he became a doctor at the British consulate.

Langdon was one of the founding members of Sevilla CF in January 1890, being appointed as the club's first-ever doctor. Two months later, on 8 March 1890, Langdon was one of the two linesmen in the first official football match in Spain, in which Sevilla claimed a 2–0 win over Recreativo de Huelva. The other linesmen was Huelva's Bower, which means that were the first assistant referees in the history of Spanish football. The referee was the president of Sevilla, Edward F. Johnston, who was also born in 1854.

== Death ==
Langdon died in Seville in 1899, at the age of either 44 or 45, thus leaving his son orphaned at a very early age. He was buried at the Cementerio de San Jorge, which also housed the burials of Adam Kirkwood, Bernard Whishaw, John Morris Mandy, and Juan Cunningham, thus becoming known as the "English cemetery".

Together with José Luis Gallegos, his son Carlos played a crucial role in the reactivation of Sevilla CF in 1905.

== Bibliography ==
- Castro Prieto, Juan (2004). Primeros pasos del foot-ball sevillano: 1890-1915 [First steps of Sevillian foot-ball: 1890-1915] (in Spanish). Seville: Editorial Punto Rojo Libros. ISBN 9788460925620.
