= Football in Spain =

- Country: Spain
- Governing body: RFEF
- National team: Men's · women's
- First played: 1890; 136 years ago
- Registered players: 1,063,090
- Clubs: 21,148

National competitions
- FIFA World Cup; UEFA European Championship; UEFA Nations League; FIFA Women's World Cup; UEFA Women's Championship; UEFA Women's Nations League

Club competitions
- List: League: Primera División Liga F Segunda División Primera Federación Segunda Federación Tercera Federación Divisiones Regionales; Cups: Copa del Rey Copa de la Reina de Fútbol Copa Federación Supercopa de España Supercopa de España Femenina

International competitions
- FIFA Club World Cup; FIFA Intercontinental Cup; UEFA Champions League; UEFA Europa League; UEFA Conference League; UEFA Super Cup; UEFA Women's Champions League; UEFA Women's Europa Cup

Football is the most popular sport in Spain, with 61% of the population interested in it. Spain has some of the most influential teams in Europe (Real Madrid, Barcelona, Atlético Madrid, Sevilla, Valencia, and others) as well as many players (mostly unprofessional) and teams registered in all categories (1,063,090 players in 21,148 clubs). Moreover, football is the sport that interests the majority of Spanish people (48%) and a total of 67% of the population said they were fans of or had a liking for a particular club.

In a survey of the sports habits of the Spanish population made in 2010, football was ranked as the second most popular recreational sport practiced by the population (17.9%). 75.9% said they had purchased tickets to a football match. In addition, 67.3% of the people said they saw all, almost all, many, or some of the football matches broadcast on television. In another survey undertaken in 2014, football practice decreased to 14% of the population, being overtaken by other sports such as running, cycling, and swimming for recreation. However, in this survey, football was still the sport that interested most of Spain's people (48%). 67% of the population said they were fans of or sympathized with a particular club. In addition, 74.9% said they watched, whenever possible, the matches broadcast on television regarding their favourite teams, and 42.4% had flags, badges, or objects of their favourite teams. Data from this survey confirmed the widespread impression that most of Spain's people are supporters of Real Madrid (32.4%) or FC Barcelona (24.7%), and the other teams have fewer supporters nationwide, such as Atlético de Madrid (16.1%), Valencia CF (3.5%), Athletic Bilbao (3.3%), or Sevilla FC (3.2%).

A relationship between football, politics, intercultural relations, identity, and attitudes toward regionalism in Spain has also been reported.

The Royal Spanish Football Federation (Spanish: Real Federación Española de Fútbol) – the country's national football governing body – organizes two Cup competitions: the Copa del Rey and the Supercopa de España. The Liga de Fútbol Profesional (LFP) (English: Professional Football League), integrated by a total of 42 football clubs, forms part of the Royal Spanish Football Federation (RFEF) but has autonomy in its organization and functioning. It is responsible for organising state football leagues in coordination with RFEF.

The Spain national football team has won the FIFA World Cup twice and succeeded in the UEFA European Championship and the Olympic tournament. The biggest success achieved by the national team was the historic treble of winning tournaments in a row: the

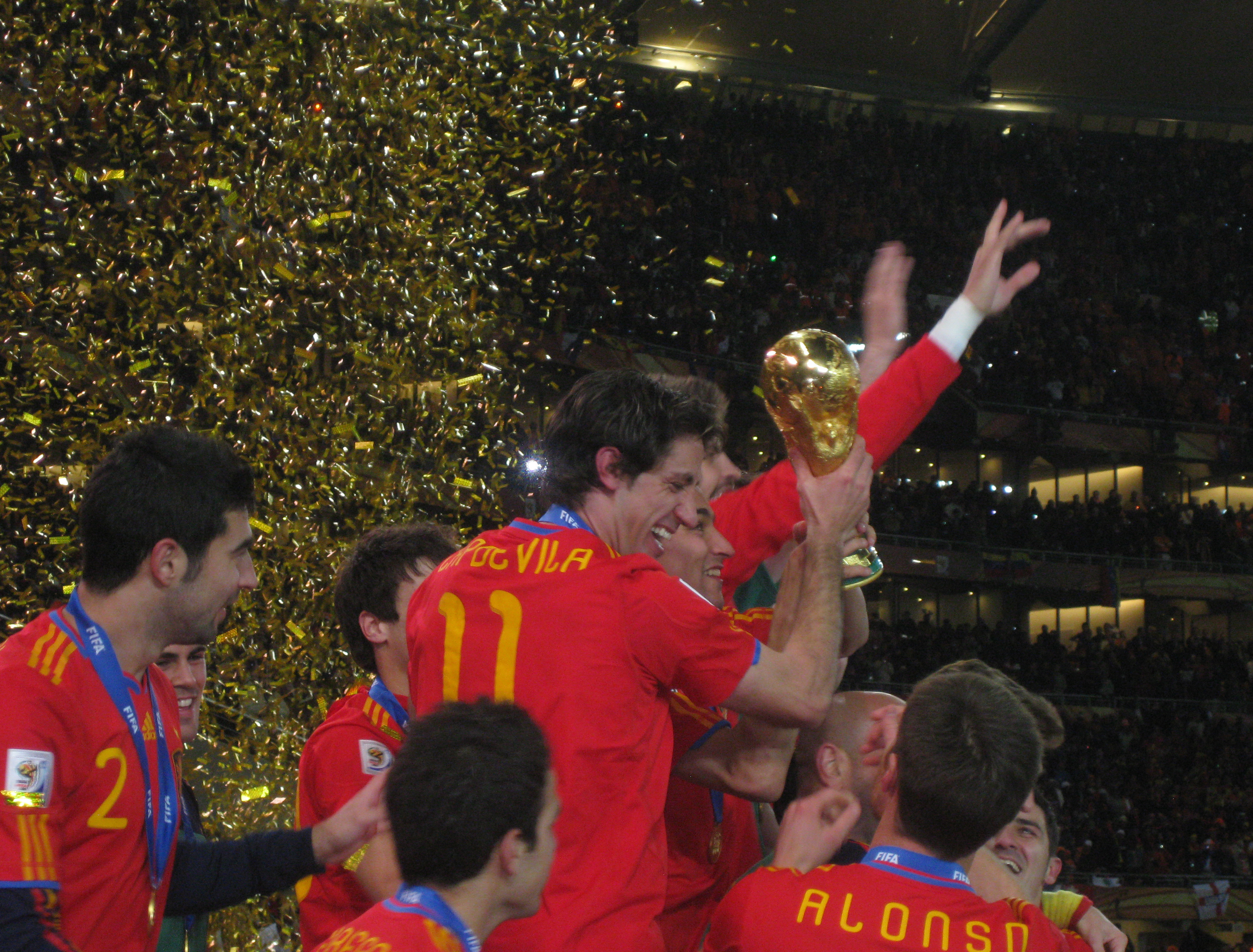
Spain lifting the 2010 World Cup after defeating the Netherlands.

UEFA European Championship in 2008, the FIFA World Cup in 2010 and 2026, and the UEFA European Championship in 2012. They also won the UEFA European Championship in 1964 and in 2024. The Spain women's national football team became world champions following their victory in the 2023 FIFA Women's World Cup, therefore making Spain only the second nation after Germany to win both the men's and women's senior World Cup, and the first nation to hold both titles simultaneously. In all categories, Spain's men's national teams have won 27 titles in FIFA, UEFA, and Olympic tournaments within the European continent and beyond. In qualifying for the UEFA championships, the team ranked highest in the number of shots (227) and possession (70%) and completed with the highest pass percentage (91%) out of all qualifying teams. The team was also the first to retain the Henri Delaunay trophy.

The First Division of the Liga de Fútbol Profesional – commonly known in the English-speaking world as La Liga – is one of the strongest football leagues in both Europe and the world. At the club level, Spanish football clubs have won a total of 66 international tournaments. They are the most successful in different current European competitions, such as UEFA Champions League, UEFA Super Cup, and UEFA Europa League; and were also the most successful in the extinct Inter-Cities Fairs Cup.

During its most successful time, Tiki-taka was the characteristic football style of play developed by the Spain national football team (and at the club level, by FC Barcelona). This football style is characterized by possessing the ball for large portions of the game and moving the ball quickly from one player to the next, with short and quick passes, keeping the ball away from the opponent, and then delivering an incisive pass to score a goal.

Professional football in Spain is a sociocultural event that significantly contributes to the Spanish economy in terms of demand and supply. In economic terms, during 2013, professional football generated more than €7.6 billion, including direct, indirect, and induced effects, representing 0.75% of the Spanish GDP. Moreover, due to the financial crisis in the last few years, many Spanish football clubs in the top two divisions have been facing severe economic troubles due to paying bank debts. In addition, the European Union authorities have warned the Spanish authorities to halt public funding of debt-ridden clubs.

Spain's national futsal team is one of the strongest teams in the world, being six times champion in the UEFA Futsal Championship and two times champion in the FIFA Futsal World Championship.

== History ==
=== 19th century ===
Modern football was introduced to Spain in the late 19th century by a combination of mostly British immigrant workers, visiting sailors, and Spanish students returning from Britain. In the late 1870s, various English workers scattered throughout the peninsula began to establish informal groups that were dedicated to different recreational practices, especially cricket and football, particularly in Spanish ports of Vigo, Andalusia, Huelva, Seville, and Bilbao.

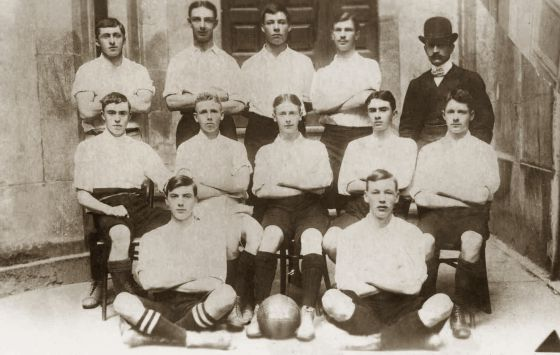
Exiles FC in 1903

The first kick to a football ball on Spanish soil occurred in 1873 in either Huelva or Vigo. The investigations about which one was the dean of football in Spain remained inconclusive and open to debate by historians. That year, in Huelva, British workers of the Rio Tinto Company Limited (RTCL) began to arrive at the Minas de Riotinto after the company won a concession to exploit the copper mines of Rio Tinto. The Englishmen who worked in the mines gathered to play their favourite sports, like cricket, rugby, and football. Meanwhile, in Vigo, a group of British workers for the Eastern Telegraph Company arrived there from Porthcurno, a small isolated town in the far west of England, thus earning the nickname "Exiles". These two colonies gave birth to the first Spanish football teams: Exiles Foot-Ball Club (1876) and Río Tinto Foot-Ball Club (1878). These teams were never officially established, so there is no legal record of their existence. The first legally established Spanish football club was the Cricket and Football Club of Madrid, founded in October 1879 under the protection of King Alfonso XII, who was named the Honorary President of the club. Together with Exiles FC and Rio Tinto FC, it was one of the three proto-clubs that pioneered and expanded football in Spain. Even though the Madrid team disappeared a few years later, Exiles FC and Rio Tinto FC lasted decades and played a pivotal role in the amateur beginnings of football in Spain.

Rio Tinto FC catalyzed the Sociedad de Juego de Pelota ('Ball Game Society') in 1884, which organized football games and other typical British sports. These meetings were initially contested between the club's members and later against crews of English ships that docked in the port of Huelva. The earliest known example of this dates to March 1888, when the club played football and cricket matches against the mariners of a merchant ship called Jane Cory. This society developed into the oldest official football club in Spain, Recreativo de Huelva, founded in December 1889 by two Scottish doctors of the Rio Tinto Company, Alexander Mackay and Robert Russell Ross. Exiles FC lasted until the early 1910s; the club had good relations with the first football clubs to emerge in the city, and collaborated with them by providing knowledge, players, coaches, and even sharing its field, El Relleno.

After Recreativo de Huelva, Sevilla FC is the next-oldest club in Spain, having been founded on 25 January 1890, by Isaias White and the then British vice-consul of Seville, Edward Farquharson Johnston, who became the club's first president. Unlike previous clubs, Sevilla FC was solely devoted to football, leading it to be considered Spain's first football club. The first official football match in Spain was contested between Sevilla FC and Recreativo de Huelva in Seville on 8 March 1890, at an abandoned mine near Calle Sanz. There were two Spanish players on each team; all other players were British, mostly Scottish, including Sevilla's captain Hugh MacColl. Sevilla FC won 2–0.

Football was introduced in the Basque Country by two distinct groups, both with British connections: British shipyard workers and Basque students returning from schooling in Britain. The British employees of the Nervión Shipyards, located in Sestao (Vizcaya), organized and played the first known football match in the region, which was held on 4 April 1890, between the Machinery Department (engineers) and the Shipyard Workers. This group of football pioneers were part of a multi-sports club called Club Atleta, which had been founded in late 1889. In November 1892, the president of Club Atleta, Enrique Jones Bird, successfully asked for permission to play in the Hippodrome of Lamiako, which thus became the new home of organized football in the Basque Country. It was from Lamiako that the sport of football took off in Bilbao, with several Bilbainos swarming the field to watch the teams of British workers challenge each other every weekend, and eventually, the local citizens themselves decided to challenge a British team in 1894, which ended in a 6–0 win for the British. The result, however, did not discourage the enthusiastic locals who were quick to play another match and soon the sport gained followers among the young students of the Gymnasium Zamacois, and in 1898, a group of seven students of that gym led by Juan Astorquia founded the first Basque football club: Athletic Club. This early British influence was reflected in the use of English names such as Recreation Club, Athletic Club, and Football Club. Although Athletic was founded in 1898, the club was not officially established until the historic meeting in Café García on 5 September 1901, where the club's first board was elected.

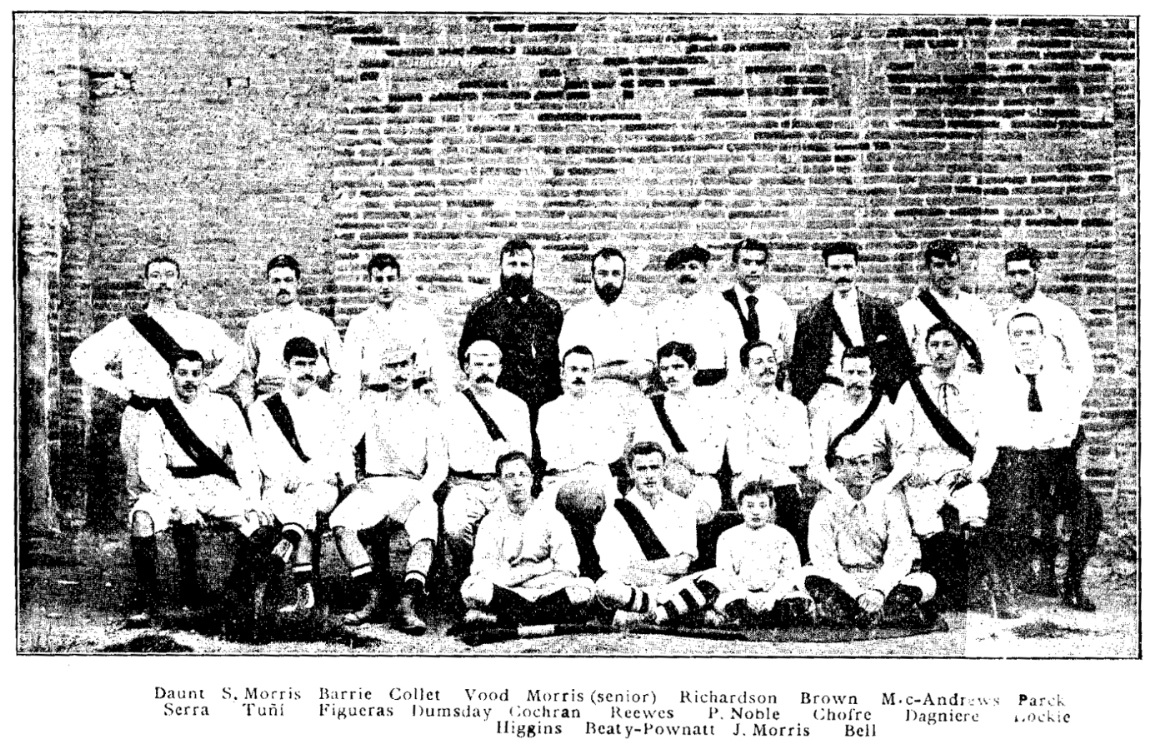
The two sides of the Barcelona Football Club before a match on 12 March 1893, considered Spain's oldest image of a football team.

In the late 19th century, Catalonia enjoyed the country's most developed industry, largely thanks to its cotton industry. For this reason, Barcelona was home to a group of British immigrants. The first known football match in the city was held on the grounds near the Hippodrome of Can Tunis in late 1892. Very little is known about that meeting, only that it was the work of members of the Club Regatas de Barcelona (a club of rowing and sailing) and cricket players of the British Club de Barcelona located on Rambla dels Capuchins. James Reeves, the spokesman of the British members of Club Regatas, convinced some members of the two clubs to practice football, thus forming a society known as the Barcelona Football Club. This group of football pioneers in the city played several matches in the 1892–93 season, most of which were training matches between the Blue and Red teams. The last game of the season on 12 March 1893 was the subject of the first proper chronicle of a football match in Spain, appearing in La Dinastía. The photograph of the two sides before the game is regarded as Spain's oldest image of a football team. However, Palamós FC was the first official and registered Catalan football club in 1898. The Swiss Hans Gamper founded FC Barcelona on 29 November 1899. Other clubs founded in 1900 – such as Escocès FC (previously Sant Andreu), Hispania AC (previously Team Rojo), University SC, FC Internacional, and Irish Football Club – competed for local support in the first competitions, including the first-ever tournament held in Spain, the Copa Macaya.

In Madrid, the first games were promoted by Institución Libre de Enseñanza (ILE; 'Free Educational Institution'), an educational and cultural centre. The first official and registered football club in Madrid was Football Club Sky, founded in 1897. A conflict between its members caused the club to split in two in 1900. Then, several clubs also emerged in Madrid, most notably Madrid Football Club, officially established in March 1902 by Catalan brothers Juan and Carlos Padrós.

The rapid growth of football enthusiasts and entities led to the creation of the first football associations in charge of its regulation. The first football association founded in Spain was the Catalan Football Federation (Catalan: Federació Catalana de Futbol), established in Catalonia on 11 November 1900, as the Football Association of Catalonia (Catalan: Football Associació de Catalunya). With the first associations also came the first competitions and tournaments, such as the Copa Macaya on 6 January 1901, which was organized on the initiative of Alfonso Macaya: the then honorary president of Hispania AC, who went on to win the first edition of the competition, thus becoming the very first Spanish club to win an official title. Copa Macaya was the first tournament ever played in Spain and all Iberian Peninsula and was the predecessor of the Catalan football championship (Catalan: Campionat de Catalunya). The Copa Macaya is recognized as the first Catalan championship. The Catalan Championship emerged just a few days after the Campeonato de Madrid, whose first edition was won by Moderno FC.

The poorly organized sport still found many detractors that hindered further expansion because it was considered dangerous in its early years. In 1902 the first national championship played in Spain was organized, the Copa de la Coronación, by the recently established Madrid Football Federation, which was the catalyst for the current Copa del Rey due to its success.

=== 20th century ===
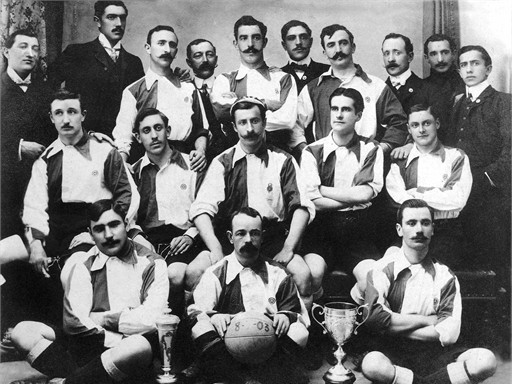
Athletic Bilbao won the first Spanish Cup (1903).

The Copa del Rey (English: King's Cup) competition was founded in 1903, one year after a previous football tournament named Coronation Cup. It was Spain's national football Championship from 1903 until the establishment of the League Championship in 1928.

The Spanish Federation of Football Clubs was formed in 1909. However, there were discrepancies between the member clubs years later, and some of the clubs formed another association called the Royal Spanish Union of Clubs of Football. Finally, the two associations reached an agreement, and the Royal Spanish Football Federation was founded in 1913, which allowed Spanish football to enter FIFA. In these years, Athletic was the most dominant club in the country, and the first idols in Spain began to appear, like Pichichi and Paulino Alcántara.

The Spain national team was created in 1920 during the dispute of the Olympic Games in Antwerp. The success of the Spanish national team in the Olympic Games, which won the silver medal, was huge in the development of football as a mass social event in Spain. The interest in football grew, more people attended stadiums, more football information appeared in the newspapers, and football was used as an element of national prestige and political propaganda.

After the Olympic triumph, football experienced a popularity boost among Spanish fans, and as a result, stadium attendance increased, and the pressure of professionalism grew. Spanish football eventually turned professional in 1925. An agreement between several clubs was made on November 23, 1928, officially establishing Spain's national football division and the birth of the Spanish League. The first league championship began in 1929.

The Spanish Civil War (1936–1939) disrupted national competitions. Although the Spanish League was suspended, the Catalan and Valencian clubs continued contesting the Mediterranean League in early 1937. Barcelona later toured Mexico and the United States, supporting the Spanish Republic.

The Spanish League and the Cup were restored in the 1939–40 season after the Civil War had ended. Francisco Franco's regime, a fascist political system, began to use football as a propaganda tool for the new regime. In 1941, as part of his policy of eradicating regional identities, the Franco regime banned using non-Castilian names. As a result, many clubs that had chosen English prefixes previously, such as Athletic or Football clubs, had to amend their initial names for other Castilian (such as Atlético or Club de Fútbol). The Catalan Championship was banned, and the Catalan shield was taken from FC Barcelona's badge. Spanish football began to rebuild slowly after the War, but Spain's isolated international position meant they did not properly re-enter International football until 1950. Later, Franco's regime could use football, based on the European triumphs of Real Madrid in the 1950s, for political purposes. In this manner, Real Madrid was used as a Spanish brand of success to promote Spain's image abroad and the pride of being Spanish in the country itself.

Spain was selected as the host of the 1982 FIFA World Cup, and the national team was eliminated in the second group stage.

Until the 1984–85 season, the Royal Spanish Football Federation (RFEF) organized the league tournament. Since then, the competition has been organized by the Liga de Fútbol Profesional (LFP)(English: Professional Football League), an independent body that was formed at the initiative of the clubs themselves after disagreements with the RFEF regarding the management professionalization and economic division of the League benefits.

Since the entry into force of Spanish Law 10/1990, almost all clubs competing professionally in Spain are companies under the legal status of sports companies, whose ownership is in the hands of its shareholders. Only three professional clubs (Athletic Club, Barcelona, and Real Madrid) kept their original structure, such as sports clubs directly controlled by their members.

=== Recent years ===
After the appearance of private television in Spain, clubs' revenue increased due to lucrative contracts signed to broadcast matches on television, allowing the teams to sign top players. However, as a result, most clubs also vastly increased their spending.

La Liga has been in significant financial turmoil in the last few years. As of 2013, Real Madrid and Barcelona were at the top of the Forbes list of most valuable football teams, while the remaining Spanish clubs had a debt of around €4.1 billion. For this reason, most clubs had to cut their budgets drastically. In 2013, the third biggest club, Atlético Madrid, had a debt of around €180 million; to relieve the debt, the club sold star player Radamel Falcao for €60 million. Television companies also began to lose subscribers; Digital+ said it had lost 15% of subscribers since 2012, and Mediapro lost 25% from 2011 to 2013, also having to shut down MARCA TV.

== Women's football ==
A Barcelona Femení match on April 22, 2022.

Social interest in women's football has been growing in recent years, leading to increased economic investment. A record crowd for a European women's club football match was recorded at the Wanda Metropolitano stadium in Madrid on 17 March 2019, when 60,739 fans came to a game between Atlético Madrid and FC Barcelona; that attendance exceeded the previous record of 48,121 – also set in Spain in 2019 when Athletic Bilbao played Atlético Madrid at the San Mamés stadium. This record has since been broken again, with the highest attendance for a Spanish women's football match being the game at Camp Nou with FC Barcelona against VfL Wolfsburg on 22 April 2022, at 91,648 fans.

There are two national competitions, the Liga F and the Copa de la Reina ('Queen's Cup').

The first teams and informal women's football competitions in Spain emerged in the 1970s. However, they were not officially recognized by the Royal Spanish Football Federation until 1980, with the founding of the National Women's Football Committee. The first official national competition was the Copa de la Reina ('Queen's Cup'), established in 1983. The Women's National League began playing in the 1988–89 season.

The Spain women's national football team has qualified three times in the FIFA Women's World Cup, becoming World Champions in 2023 following their victory over England; and twice in the UEFA Women's Championship. Its youth division has had success in recent times. The under-20 team won the FIFA U-20 Women's World Cup in 2022 (runners-up in 2018). The under-19 team won the UEFA Women's Under-19 Championship in 2004, 2017, and 2018 (runners-up in 2012, 2014, 2015, and 2016). The under-17 team won the UEFA Women's Under-17 Championship in 2010, 2011, 2015, and 2018 (runners-up in 2009, 2014, 2016, and 2017), as well as the FIFA U-17 Women's World Cup in 2018 and 2022 (runners-up in 2014, and third-place in 2010 and 2016).

== Spain men's national football team (La Roja) ==
Within Spain, regional teams, most notably the Catalonia national football team, the Basque Country national football team, and even the Galicia national football team, began to compete against each other from 1915 onwards. Despite not being officially recognized by FIFA, these regional teams still occasionally play friendly games, with some national team players playing for both teams. Some autonomous governments and social sectors in the historical communities (especially in Catalonia and Basque Country) prefer to call their regional teams the national team while claiming to participate in international tournaments.

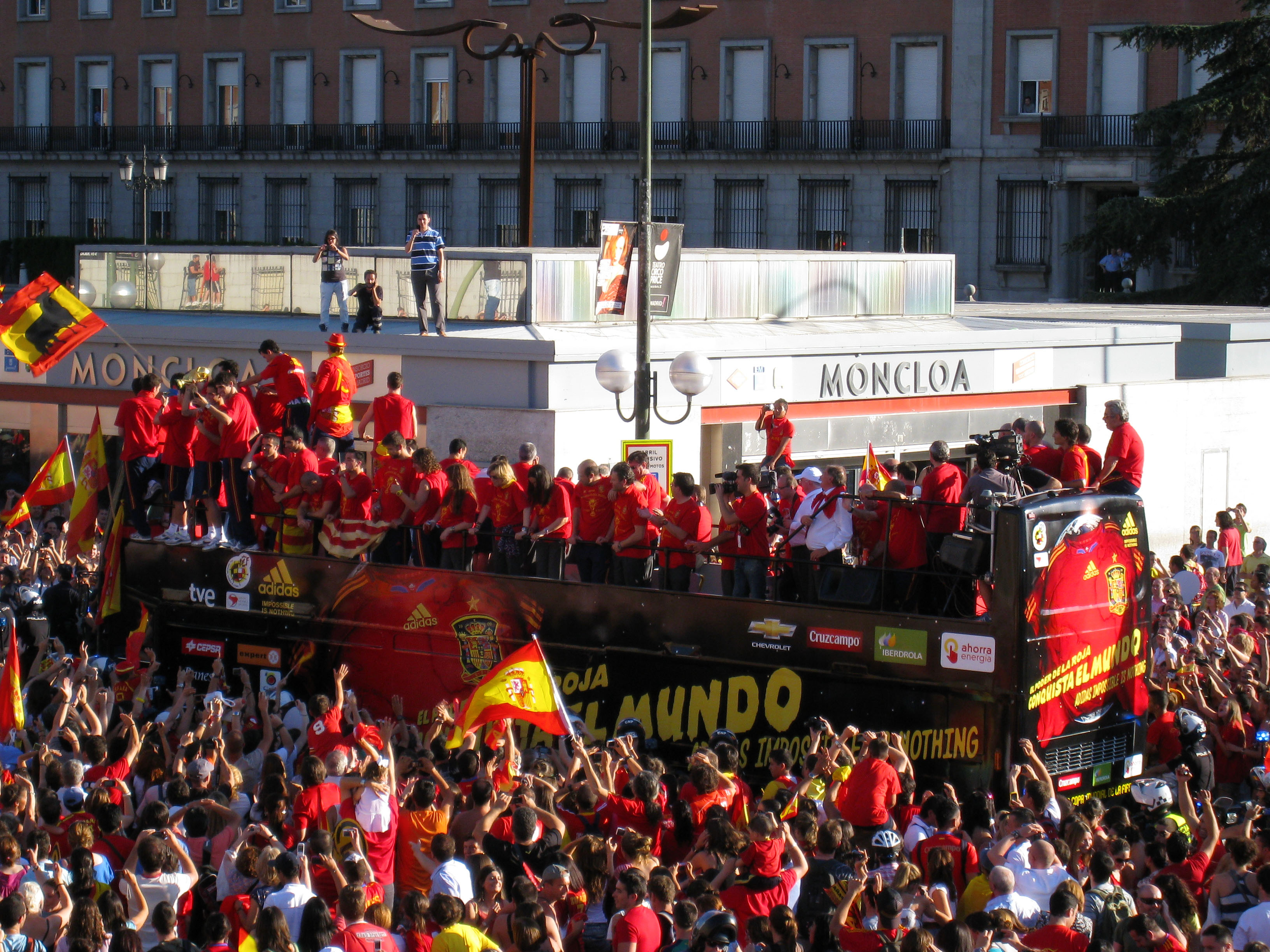
World Cup victory celebrations in Madrid in July 2010.

The Spain national team, commonly referred to as La selección (English: The selection) or La Roja (English: The Red one), made their international debut at the 1920 Olympic Games in Belgium and came away with the silver medal. Since then, the Spain national team has participated in fifteen of twenty-one FIFA World Cups and nine out of fourteen UEFA European Championships. Historically, the Spain national team did not achieve important results in terms of trophies or develop an attractive playing style. Surprisingly, this fact contrasted with the huge success of the main Spanish football clubs at the European level. Nevertheless, the triumphs of the Spain national team in the 2008 and 2012 European Championship, and 2010 and 2026 FIFA World Cup, with an attractive playing style, marked a turning point that divided the history of the Spain national football team into two parts.

The Spain national football team won FIFA Team of Year in 2008, 2009, 2010, 2011, 2012, and 2013, and the Laureus World Sports Award for Team of the Year in 2011.

The Spain national football team won seven trophies in FIFA and UEFA tournaments: two FIFA World Cups in 2010 and 2026, four UEFA European Championships in 1964, 2008, 2012, and 2024, as well as the Nations League in 2023. In addition, it was runner-up in the UEFA European Championship in 1984 and the FIFA Confederations Cup in 2013.

The Spain national under-23 team won the gold medal in the 1992 Olympic tournament and the silver medal in 2000.

The Spain national football team won the gold medal at the Mediterranean Games in 2005, 2007, and 2018, the silver medal in 1955, and the bronze medal in 1963 and 1967.

In addition, the honours list includes numerous titles at junior-level teams:

- UEFA European Under-21 Championship in 1986, 1998, 2011, 2013, and 2019.
- FIFA U-20 World Cup in 1999.
- UEFA European Under-19 Championship (formerly Under-18) in 1995, 2002, 2004, 2006, 2007, 2011, 2012, 2015, and 2019.
- UEFA European Under-17 Championship (formerly Under-16) in 1986, 1988, 1991, 1997, 1999, 2001, 2007, 2008, and 2017.
- 1999 Meridian Cup.

Spain has won the Maurice Burlaz Trophy, the prize awarded to the national association that has achieved the best results in UEFA's men's youth competitions (UEFA European Under-19 Championship and UEFA European Under-17 championship) over the previous two seasons, in 1994, 1996, 1998, 2002, 2004, 2006, 2007, and 2011.

=== Players ===
==== Goalkeepers ====
- Ricardo Zamora (1920s–1930s)
- Antoni Ramallets (1940s–1950s)
- José Ángel Iribar (1960s–1970s)
- Luis Arconada (1970s–1980s)
- Andoni Zubizarreta (1980s–1990s)
- Iker Casillas (2000s–2010s)
- David de Gea (2010s)
- Unai Simón (2020s)

==== Defenders ====
- Jacinto Quincoces (1920s–1930s)
- Joan Segarra (1950s–1960s)
- Jesús Garay (1950s–1960s)
- José Santamaría (1950s–1960s)
- Feliciano Rivilla (1960s)
- José Antonio Camacho (1970s–1980s)
- Antonio Maceda (1980s)
- Rafael Gordillo (1970s–1990s)
- Miguel Ángel Nadal (1990s–2000s)
- Fernando Hierro (1980s–2000s)
- Abelardo Fernández (1990s–2000s)
- Carles Puyol (1990s–2010s)
- Sergio Ramos (2000s–2010s)
- Gerard Piqué (2000s–2010s)
- Jordi Alba (2010s)
- Aymeric Laporte (2020s)
- Marc Cucurella (2020s)
- Pedro Porro (2020s)
- Pau Cubarsí (2020s)

==== Midfielders ====
- Josep Samitier (1920s–1930s)
- Martín Marculeta (1920s–1930s)
- Leonardo Cilaurren (1920s–1930s)
- José Luis Panizo (1940s–1950s)
- Antonio Puchades (1940s–1950s)
- Alfredo Di Stéfano (1950s–1960s)
- Luis del Sol (1960s–1970s)
- Luis Suárez (1960s–1970s)
- Luis Aragonés (1960s–1970s)
- Chus Pereda (1960s),
- Pirri (1960s–1970s)
- Jesús María Zamora (1970s–1980s)
- Míchel (1980s–1990s)
- José Luis Pérez Caminero (1990s)
- Luis Enrique (1990s–2000s)
- Pep Guardiola (1990s–2000s)
- Julen Guerrero (1990s)
- Gaizka Mendieta (1990s–2000s)
- Xavi (1990s–2010s)
- Xabi Alonso (2000s–2010s)
- Andrés Iniesta (2000s–2010s)
- Santi Cazorla (2000s–2010s)
- David Silva (2000s–2010s)
- Cesc Fàbregas (2000s–2010s)
- Juan Mata (2000s–2010s)
- Sergio Busquets (2000s–2010s)
- Fabián Ruiz (2020s)
- Rodri (2020s)
- Dani Olmo (2020s)
- Pedri (2020s)

==== Forwards ====
- Pichichi (1910s–20s)
- Paulino Alcántara (1910s–1920s)
- Luis Regueiro (1920s–1930s)
- Isidro Lángara (1930s)
- César (1940s–1950s)
- Telmo Zarra (1940s–1950s)
- Agustín Gaínza (1940s–1950s)
- Estanislau Basora (1940s–1950s)
- László Kubala (1950s–1960s)
- Ferenc Puskás (1960s)
- Francisco Gento (1950s–1960s)
- Amancio Amaro (1960s–1970s)
- Santillana (1970s–1980s)
- Juanito (1970s–1980s)
- Quini (1970s–1980s)
- Roberto López Ufarte (1970s–1980s)
- Emilio Butragueño (1980s–1990s)
- Julio Salinas (1980s–1990s)
- Raúl (1990s–2000s)
- Fernando Morientes (1990s–2000s)
- David Villa (2000s–2010s)
- Fernando Torres (2000s–2010s)
- Ferran Torres (2020s)
- Mikel Oyarzabal (2020s)
- Lamine Yamal (2020s)
- Nico Williams (2020s)

== Spain women's national football team (La Roja) ==
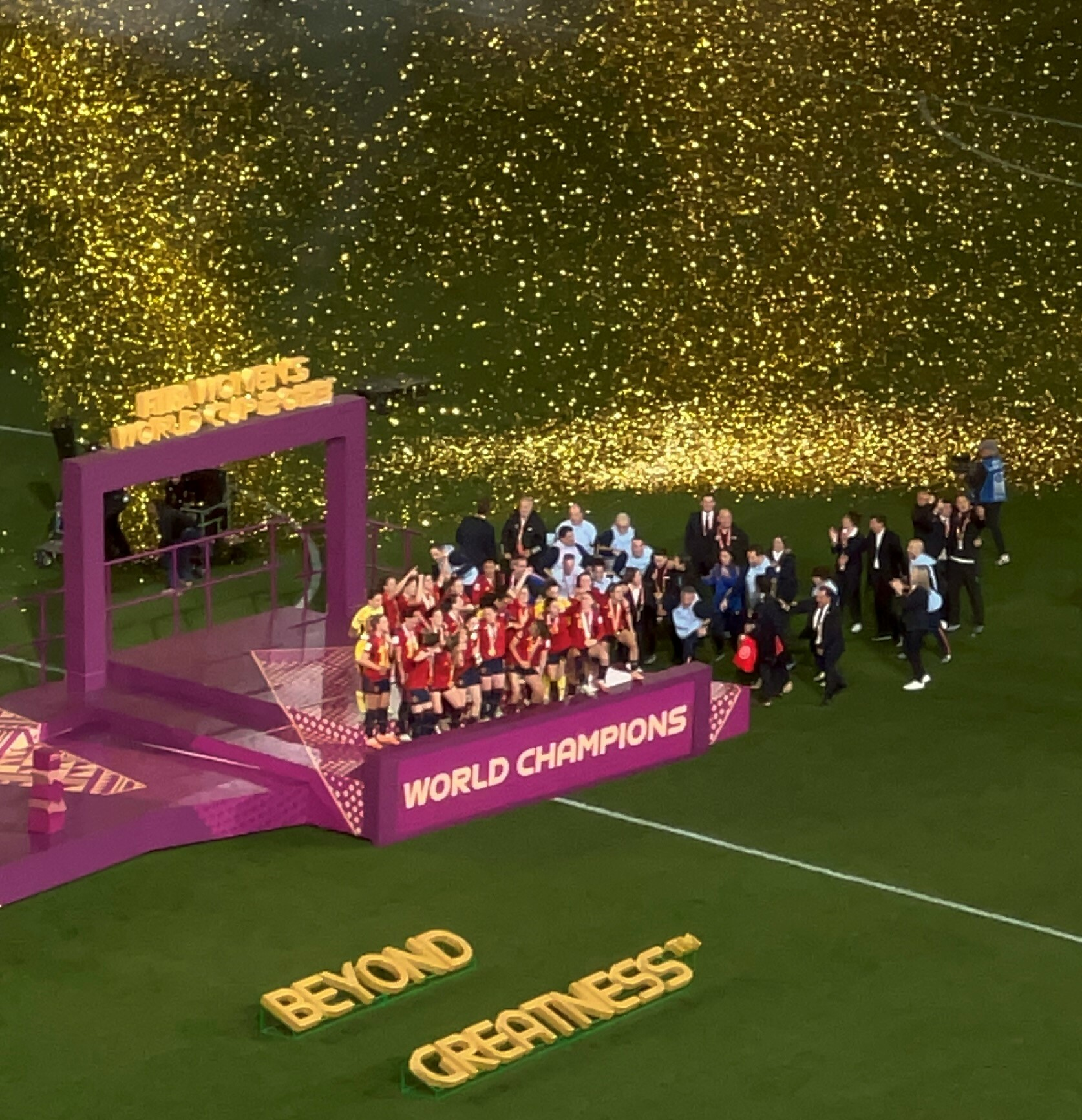
Spain celebrating their 2023 World Cup victory.

The Spain national football team represents Spain in international women's football since 1980, after the ban on women's football was lifted. The Spain national team made their debut on February 5, 1983, in Pontevedra.

Spain achieved second place in the 1997 European Championship, the first time they had ever been in this tournament. Spain first qualified for the FIFA World Cup in 2015. A place in the top 10 of the FIFA World Rankings was secured for Spain in 2021, when their players won all categories of the UEFA awards, the first time this was done all from one nation.

In 2023, Spain were crowned World Champions, being only one of five national teams to have been so since the first Women's World Cup in 1991. Together with their youth teams, Spain became the first nation ever to hold all three Women's World Cups at the same time when they won the senior 2023 World Cup, 2022 U-20 World Cup, and 2022 U-17 World Cup.

Junior teams of Spain have been successful, having the following victories:

- U-17 European Championship in 2010, 2011, 2015, and 2018.
- U-17 World Cup in 2018 and 2022.
- UEFA U-19 European Championship in 2004, 2017, 2018, 2022, and 2023.
- FIFA U-20 World Cup in 2022.

=== Players ===
==== Goalkeepers ====
- Roser Serra (1990–1998)
- Ainhoa Tirapu (2012–2017)
- Lola Gallardo (2013–2022)
- Sandra Paños (2012–)
- Misa Rodríguez (2021–)

==== Defenders ====
- Antonia Is Piñera (1989–1999)
- Arantza del Puerto (1990–2005)
- Marina Nohalez (1996–2002)
- Melisa Nicolau (2004–2013)
- Ruth García (2005–2016)
- Marta Torrejón (2007–2019)
- Leire Landa (2011–2015)
- Irene Paredes (2012–)
- Celia Jiménez (2014–2019)
- Ivana Andrés (2015–)
- Andrea Pereira (2016–2022)
- Mapi León (2016–)
- Leila Ouahabi (2016–)
- Ona Batlle (2019–)
- Laia Aleixandri (2019–)
- Olga Carmona (2021–)
- Oihane Hernández (2022–)

==== Midfielders ====
- Inmaculada Castañón (1983–1988)
- Itziar Bakero (1987–1995)
- Beatriz García (1988–1998)
- Rosa Castillo Varó (1994–2001)
- Silvia Zarza (1996–2003)
- Vanesa Gimbert (1997–2010)
- Raquel Cabezón (1998–2007)
- Itziar Gurrutxaga (1998–2008)
- Eli Ibarra (2002–2015)
- Sandra Vilanova (2003–2013)
- Miriam Diéguez (2005–2016)
- Ana Romero (2007–2012)
- Silvia Meseguer (2008–2019)
- Victoria Losada (2010–2020)
- Virginia Torrecilla (2013–2020)
- Marta Corredera (2013–2021)
- Alexia Putellas (2013–)
- Amanda Sampedro (2015–2020)
- Claudia Zornoza (2016–)
- Aitana Bonmatí (2017–)
- Patricia Guijarro (2017–)
- Marta Cardona (2019–)
- Sheila García (2019–)
- Irene Guerrero (2019–)
- Teresa Abelleira (2020–)

==== Forwards ====
- Eli Artola (1984–1992)
- Ángeles Parejo (1988–1999)
- Mar Prieto (1989–2000)
- Yolanda Mateos (1996–2001)
- Auxi Jiménez (1996–2002)
- Laura del Río (2000–2008)
- Erika Vázquez (2003–2016)
- Adriana Martín (2005–2015)
- Natalia Pablos (2005–2015)
- Verónica Boquete (2005–2017)
- Sonia Bermúdez (2008–2017)
- Mari Paz Vilas (2008–2018)
- Priscila Borja (2010–2015)
- Jennifer Hermoso (2011–)
- Olga García (2015–2019)
- Esther González (2016–)
- Mariona Caldentey (2017–)
- Lucía García (2018–2022)
- Alba Redondo (2018–)
- Nahikari García (2018–)
- Eva Navarro (2019–)
- Athenea del Castillo (2020–)
- Salma Paralluelo (2022–)

== Football club competitions ==
Currently, the three most essential competitions between clubs in Spain are La Liga (English: League), the Copa del Rey (English: King's Cup), and the Supercopa de España (English: Spanish Supercup). Other extinct competitions were the League Cup, the Eva Duarte Cup, and the President's Cup of the Spanish Football Federation. Up to a total of sixteen clubs have been winners of some of the official competitions in Spain at the highest level, and FC Barcelona is the most awarded club with seventy-five national titles,

The Spanish football league system consists of several leagues bound together hierarchically by promotion and relegation. In addition, Spanish Royal Federation Cup is a football competition for teams from the Segunda División B, the Tercera División and sometimes from the Preferente Regional who have failed to qualify or have been eliminated in the first round of the Copa del Rey.

=== The League (La Liga) ===
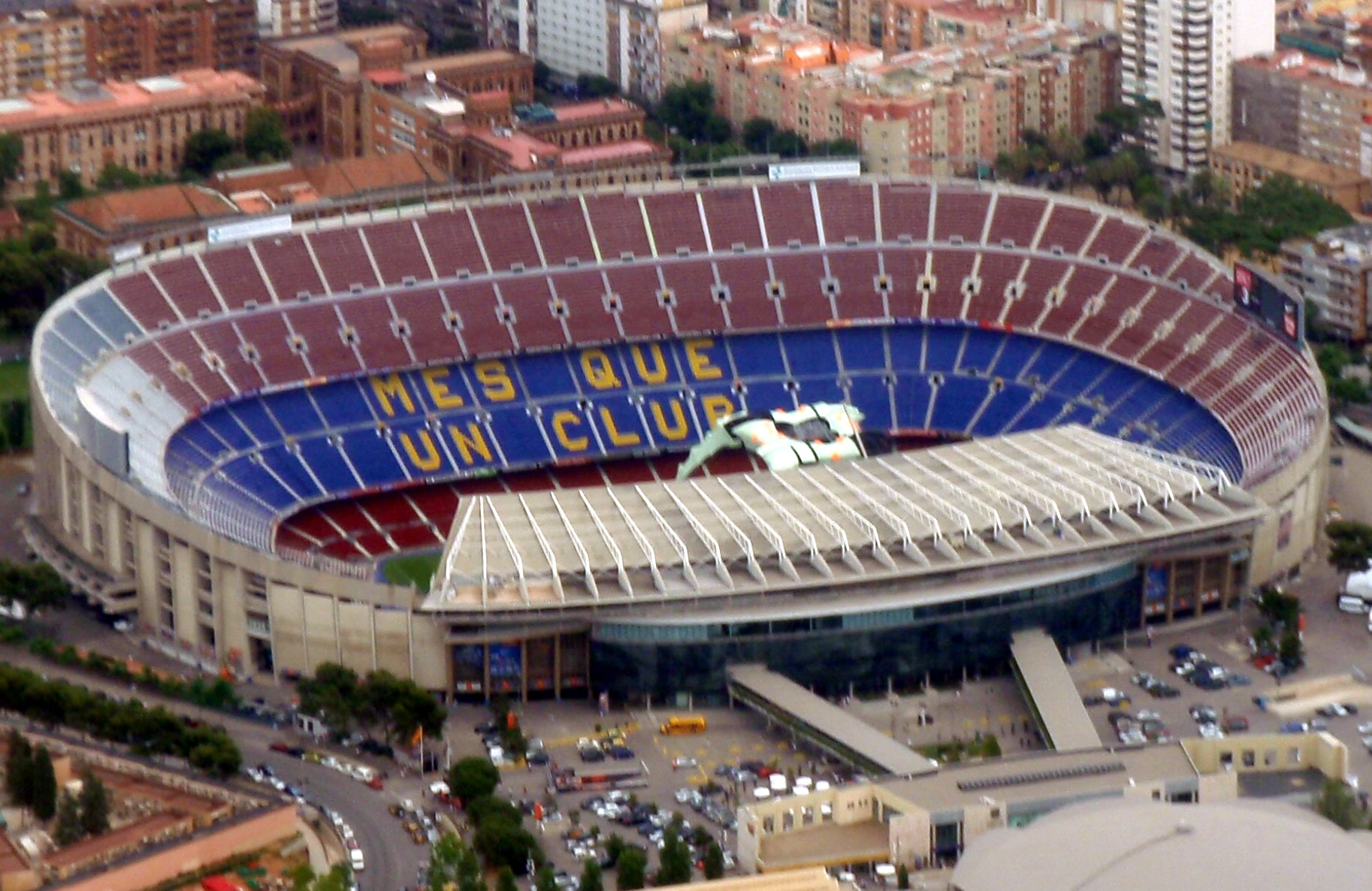
Camp Nou, Barcelona, is the largest stadium in Europe

In April 1927, Álvaro Trejo, a director at Arenas Club de Getxo, first proposed the idea of a national league in Spain. After much debate about the league's size and who would participate, the RFEF eventually agreed on the ten teams forming the first Primera División in 1928. FC Barcelona, Real Madrid, Athletic Bilbao, Real Sociedad, Arenas Club de Getxo, and Real Unión were selected as previous Copa del Rey winners. Athletic Madrid, RCD Español, and CE Europa qualified as Copa del Rey runners-up and Racing de Santander qualified through a knock-out competition against Sevilla FC. Barcelona was the first winner of the competition. Only three founding clubs, Real Madrid, Barcelona, and Athletic Bilbao, have never been relegated from the Primera División; six other clubs have never been below the top two tiers: Sevilla, Real Sociedad, Sporting de Gijón, Valencia, Espanyol, and Atlético Madrid.

Historically, some of the best football players in the world have played in the Spanish football league, including Ricardo Zamora, Josep Samitier, Alfredo Di Stéfano, Ladislav Kubala, Ferenc Puskás, Raymond Kopa, Héctor Rial, Telmo Zarra, Francisco Gento, Luis Suárez, Johan Cruyff, Diego Maradona, Bernd Schuster, Andoni Zubizarreta, Michael Laudrup, Hristo Stoichkov, Romário, Zinedine Zidane, Rivaldo, Ronaldo, Raúl, Ronaldinho, Carles Puyol, Xavi, Andrés Iniesta, Iker Casillas, Cristiano Ronaldo, and Lionel Messi, among others.

La Liga de Fútbol Profesional (LFP) is responsible for administering the two professional football leagues in Spain. Professional Spanish football is divided into the Primera División (First Division) and Segunda División (Second Division). For sponsorship reasons, the First Division is Liga Santander, while the Second Division is La Liga SmartBank. The First Division has 20 professional teams, and the Second Division has 22. There are also lower Spain national football divisions. Every year, the three lowest-ranked teams in the First Division pass to the Second Division, and the top three ranked teams in the Second Division pass to the First Division.

La Liga is one of the world's most popular professional sports leagues. The average stadium attendance was 21,000 in the 2014–15 season, with a range of average attendance from 4,780 people with the lowest average attendance to 77,632 people with the highest average attendance. In addition, La Liga is one of the wealthiest professional sports leagues in the world by revenue ($2.2 billion in 2016).

In La Liga's 90-year history (except the three seasons in which the league was suspended due to the civil war), Barcelona and Real Madrid have won 60 titles. Barcelona and Real Madrid are two fierce rival clubs, and the matches between both two clubs are named El Clásico. Those football matches are one of the most viewed sports events in the world.

Although a total of 62 teams have competed in La Liga since its inception, only nine clubs have won the title: Real Madrid (36), Barcelona (27), Atlético Madrid (11), Athletic Bilbao (8), Valencia (6), Real Sociedad (2), Sevilla (1), Deportivo La Coruña (1), and Real Betis (1).

=== King's Cup (Copa del Rey) ===
The King's Cup is the oldest Spanish football competition organized by the Royal Spanish Football Federation. In 1902, Carlos Padrós, later president of Madrid FC (later to be Real Madrid), suggested a football competition to celebrate the coronation of Alfonso XIII. Four other teams entered the Copa del Ayuntamiento de Madrid, later developing into the Copa del Rey (English: "King's Cup"). These included Barcelona, Club Español de Fútbol, Club Bizcaya, and New Foot-Ball de Madrid. The competition featured the first recorded game between Barcelona and Madrid FC, with the former emerging 3–1 winners. Club Bizcaya, which consisted of players from both Basque teams, eventually beat Barcelona in the final. Alfonso XIII subsequently became the patron of many Spanish football clubs, permitting them to use "Real" (Spanish for "royal") in their names. Among the many clubs to add the prefix to their name was Madrid FC, which subsequently became Real Madrid.

The Copa del Rey was Spain's football national championship from 1903 (the first edition won by Athletic Bilbao with Juan de Astorquia as captain and president) until the foundation of the Campeonato de Liga—League Championship—in 1928. It was initially known as the Copa del Ayuntamiento de Madrid (Madrid City Council's Cup). Between 1905 and 1932, it was known as the Copa de Su Majestad El Rey Alfonso XIII (His Majesty King Alfonso XIII's Cup). During the Second Spanish Republic, it was known as the Copa del Presidente de la República (President of the Republic Cup) or Copa de España (Spanish Cup). During the years of Francisco Franco's Spanish State, it was known as the Copa de Su Excelencia El Generalísimo or Copa del Generalísimo (His Excellency, The Supreme General's Cup).

Fourteen clubs have won the title: Barcelona (31), Athletic Bilbao (24), Real Madrid (20), Atlético Madrid (10), Valencia (8), Real Zaragoza (6), Sevilla (5), Espanyol (4), Real Unión (4), Real Betis (3), Deportivo de La Coruña (2), Real Sociedad (2), Arenas Club de Getxo (1), and Mallorca (1).

=== Spanish Supercup (Supercopa de España) ===
The Spanish Super Cup (Supercopa de España) is a championship organized by the Royal Spanish Football Federation and contested by the winners and runners-up of La Liga and the winners and runners-up of the Copa del Rey. The competition was founded in 1982.

Ten clubs have won the title: Barcelona (15), Real Madrid (13), Athletic Bilbao (3), Deportivo La Coruña (3), Atlético Madrid (2), Valencia (1), Zaragoza (1), Mallorca (1), Sevilla (1), and Real Sociedad (1).

=== Spanish clubs in international competitions ===
The Spanish football clubs are very successful in international competitions. They are the most successful in different current European competitions, such as the UEFA Champions League, UEFA Super Cup, and UEFA Europa League; and they also were the most successful in the extinct Inter-Cities Fairs Cup.

They greatly benefit from their political and historical success as a colonial power. After the Big War (a.a. WW II), Spanish Football Clubs had their most prolific period of the century. Because of their political and economic positioning during Civil War and Cold War, they were able to win several UEFA Champions Leagues in a row. Real Madrid CF was the only club that managed to win the competition between 1956 and 1960. They were in a great position due to their economic advantage and lack of competition. Most countries were still recovering from a long and devastating World War II and could not participate in the competition due to financial or political reasons. France, Germany, England, Yugoslavia, and Russia are some of the countries that could not compete in the European Competitions for at least a decade. Real Madrid was the one who benefited and won the title five years in a row. Therefore, Real Madrid is the most successful club in international competitions, followed by Barcelona in recent years. In addition, other Spanish clubs have also won titles in international tournaments, such as Valencia, Atlético Madrid, Sevilla, Zaragoza, Villarreal, Deportivo de La Coruña, Celta Vigo, and Málaga.

Spanish football clubs hold different records in international competitions.

Real Madrid is the most successful European Cup/UEFA Champions League club. They have won fifteen titles and were runners-up three times. Real Madrid is also the most successful club in the Intercontinental Cup (three titles, sharing the record with Milan, Peñarol, Boca Juniors, and Nacional), FIFA Club World Cup (four titles), and UEFA Super Cup (six titles).

Barcelona is the second-most successful club in the FIFA Club World Cup, with three titles, and also the second-most successful club in the UEFA Super Cup (five titles, tied with Milan). In addition, Barcelona became the first football club to win six out of six competitions in a single year (2009), completing the sextuple, and the first European club in history to achieve the continental treble twice (2009 and 2015).

Sevilla is the most successful club in the UEFA Cup/UEFA Europa League, with seven titles.

In total, Spanish football clubs have won 82 international titles. Over the years, Spanish clubs have won the European Cups/Champions League twenty times, the UEFA Super Cup seventeen times, the UEFA Cup Winners' Cup seven times, the UEFA Cup/Europa League fourteen times, the UEFA Intertoto Cup seven times, and the Inter-Cities Fairs Cup six times. In addition, Spanish clubs have also won the Intercontinental Cup four times and the FIFA Club World Cup seven times.

=== Primera División de la Liga de Fútbol Femenino ===
The Primera División, also known as Liga F, is the highest level of league competition for women's football in Spain. It is organized by the Liga Profesional Femenina de Fútbol. Ranked among the top six national leagues by UEFA, it is considered one of the most important leagues in Europe. Since the 2021–22 season, the top three teams qualify for the UEFA Champions League.

Founded in 1988, a total of twelve different clubs have been champions. Barcelona is the most successful team with nine wins.

=== Queen's Cup (Copa de la Reina) ===
The Copa de la Reina is an annual cup competition organized by the Royal Spanish Football Federation. The full name is Campeonato de España - Copa de Su Majestad la Reina (Championship of Spain - Her Majesty the Queen's Cup). The tournament's first edition took place in 1983, five years before the Spanish women's league was created.

In 1981 and 1982 two editions were held under the name Copa Reina Sofía and won by Karbo. The first official recognized version of the tournament was the 1983 edition.

From 2004 to 2017, it was played in knockout style at the end of the league season, with the top eight clubs qualifying for it. Since 2018, all 16 teams of the first division join the competition, which starts to be played during league season.

The 2021–22 season featured 52 clubs; all 16 teams of the Primera División, all 32 teams from the Segunda División Pro, and the four promoted teams from the Primera Nacional de Fútbol.

Barcelona is the most successful team with ten wins, often winning the double with the league. Espanyol and Levante have six wins each.

=== Spanish Women's Super Cup (Supercopa de España Femenina) ===
The Supercopa de España Femenina is a super cup tournament, contested by the winners and runners up of the Copa de la Reina and the remaining highest ranked teams from the Primera División that had not already qualified through the cup final.

From 1997 to 2000, four editions of the Supercopa were played between the winners of the League and the Copa de la Reina, with San Vicente CFF winning its first edition, Atlético Málaga the second, Eibartarrak FT achieving the third edition and Levante (after absorbing San Vicente) winning the last.

The competition was re-instated in December 2019 by the Royal Spanish Football Federation. It was announced the Supercopa would expand to four teams, the winners and runners-up of the Copa de la Reina and Primera División.

Barcelona is the most successful team with four wins.

== Ethnic issues in Spanish football ==
While relatively calm today, ethnic issues in Spain have long been problematic. As for the legacy result from the totalitarian and repressive Francisco Franco regime, there has been a strong sense of racial segregation in Spanish football, whereas racism and previous tensions are frequently used to exploit as a sign of defiance, which has contributed to the lack of national success of Spain in international football despite its enormous talents and club powers; it is strongly reflected in Basque Country and Catalunya.

The famed El Clásico in Spain between Real Madrid and Barcelona has been marred with several issues in the relationship between ethnic Catalans. The majority supported Catalan independence and Barcelona and the Spanish-based Real Madrid, which sought to preserve Spain as an entity. The issue has been traced to Francoist Spain when Barcelona and Catalan's identity was strongly suppressed. The Francoist regime usually favoured the Madrid clubs (Real and Atlético Madrid). Following Franco's death, decades of political healing helped solve the country's dark past. However, hostility between the Catalan and Castilian populations remains persistent and often contributes to significant football hostility regarding Catalan identity and perceived suppression of the Catalan language. Catalan-born players and coaches like Xavi, Carles Puyol, and Pep Guardiola have strongly demonstrated the idea of an independent Catalunya, which often creates chaos several times.

Alongside the tensions between Catalans and Castilians, the tensions between Basques to the central Spanish government also extended to football, where Basques sought to preserve their identity and, in several cases, clash against the Spanish officials and other pro-government clubs. Basque football officials have tried unsuccessfully to gain recognition from the UEFA and FIFA several times as a separate team from Spain. The nationalist issue is also influenced by Basque football's relations with Spanish football.

There are also tensions between various ethnic regions in Spanish football, such as Valencia, Andalusia, Asturias, and Galicia, between either themselves or the central government. However, it has never extended to the level of tensions between Catalans and Basques.

== Stadiums ==
This is a list of Spanish football stadiums with a capacity greater than 50,000. They are all considered UEFA Category 4.

Image	Stadium	Capacity	City	Autonomous community	Team	Inaugurated
	Camp Nou	99,354	Barcelona	Catalonia	Barcelona	1957
	Santiago Bernabéu	83,186	Madrid	Madrid	Real Madrid	1947
	La Cartuja	71,374	Seville	Andalusia	None	1999
	Metropolitano Stadium	70,813	Madrid	Madrid	Atlético Madrid	1994
	Nou Mestalla	70,044	Valencia	Valencia	Valencia CF	2027*
	Benito Villamarín	60,270	Seville	Andalusia	Real Betis	1929
	San Mamés	53,331	Bilbao	Basque Country	Athletic Bilbao	2013

== Attendances ==
The average attendance per top-flight football league season and the club with the highest average attendance:

Season	League average	Best club	Best club average
2024–25	29,987	Real Madrid CF	72,701
2023–24	29,072	Real Madrid CF	72,061
2022–23	29,448	FC Barcelona	83,415
2021–22	—	—	—
2020–21	—	—	—
2019–20	28,864	FC Barcelona	72,472
2018–19	26,885	FC Barcelona	75,600
2017–18	27,068	FC Barcelona	66,603
2016–17	27,590	FC Barcelona	78,034
2015–16	28,568	FC Barcelona	79,724
2014–15	26,835	FC Barcelona	77,632
2013–14	26,955	FC Barcelona	72,116
2012–13	28,237	FC Barcelona	71,120
2011–12	28,796	FC Barcelona	75,844
2010–11	28,221	FC Barcelona	79,268
2009–10	28,286	FC Barcelona	78,097
2008–09	28,276	Real Madrid CF	71,947
2007–08	29,124	Real Madrid CF	76,234
2006–07	28,838	FC Barcelona	74,078
2005–06	29,029	FC Barcelona	73,225
2004–05	28,401	FC Barcelona	73,357
2003–04	28,823	Real Madrid CF	69,203
2002–03	28,593	Real Madrid CF	69,232
2001–02	26,193	Real Madrid CF	63,645
2000–01	24,408	Real Madrid CF	64,475
1999–2000	26,984	FC Barcelona	65,526
1998–99	26,859	FC Barcelona	70,263
1997–98	27,234	FC Barcelona	74,053
1996–97	28,423	FC Barcelona	86,429
1995–96	28,640	FC Barcelona	81,190
1994–95	30,532	Real Madrid CF	95,000
1993–94	25,388	FC Barcelona	79,737
1992–93	26,183	FC Barcelona	79,895

== See also ==
- Football in Madrid
- Football records and statistics in Spain
- List of association football competitions
- List of football clubs in Spain
