= Juan Cunningham =

British industrialist (1817–1871)

- Born: John Cunningham; 1817; Great Britain
- Died: 1871 (aged 53–54); Seville, Spain
- Citizenship: British
- Occupations: Businessman; Industrialist

John Cunningham (1817 – 1871), Hispanicized as Juan Cunningham, was a British businessman and industrialist who was the manager of the McAndrew Steamship Company.

== Career ==
Little is known about Cunningham's early life; he was born in 1817, and in 1854, he was in Liverpool, where he established a trading company with William Peter McAndrew under the name of McAndrew & Cunningham, which later moved to London. Their company quickly expanded abroad, and within one year of its foundation, Cunningham was already in Seville, where in 1855, he proposed and promoted the creation of a Protestant cemetery for the British colony, which was approved by popular subscription and then built on land donated by the businessman Carlos Pickman. The Cementerio de San Jorge went on to house the burials of Adam Kirkwood, Bernard Whishaw, John Sydney Langdon, John Morris Mandy, Gilbert Farquharson Johnston, and John Scroop, thus becoming known as the "English cemetery".

Four years later, in 1859, the company of William Peter's brother, Robert MacAndrew & Co, established a branch in Seville with the help of Cunningham, a British merchant based there, thus establishing the Juan Cunningham y Cía, but because of the potential implications of Cunningham's foreign status on the company, they decided to establish the Miguel Sáenz y Cía in 1861, a front man used to circumvent legal restrictions on foreign industrial activities. Cunningham's firm participated with 20% of the capital to establish the latter company, which revolved around steamship trips between Seville and London.

In 1863, the 46-year-old Cunningham established a subsidiary company in Seville, Juan Cunningham y Compañía (JCYC), which was essentially a trading house that focused on fruit exportation, particularly the renowned bitter oranges of Seville, becoming one of its first exporters and thus pioneering its transportation to England; he even went on to own important orange groves. Like the MacAndrews shipping company, the JCYC was also headquartered at Guzman el Bueno street. In addition to the JCYC of Cunningham, several other British companies established themselves in Seville during the 19th century, such as the metallurgical foundry of Portilla Hermanos y White owned by the White brothers (Thomas and Isaiah), the Compañía de Agua de los Ingleses directed by Charles Arthur Friend, and the Irish-born Cádiz native William MacPherson, a key figure of the Industrial Revolution in the city; this figures, among others, were the core of the first British colony of Seville.

In 1864, together with the Portilla brothers and José María Ibarra, he formed the Sociedad Industrial Sevillana, a company to refine sugar, and in the following year, he imported 20 agricultural machines. On 30 November 1868, Cunningham became a creditor and shareholder of Portilla, White y Cia for 3,146 pesetas. On 1 October 1870, both Cunningham and the Portilla, White y Cia appear among the founding shareholders of the Compañía del Ferrocarril de Mérida a Sevilla.

== Death and legacy ==
Coincidentally, Cunningham, Sáenz, and William Peter McAndrew all died in 1871, after which the JCYC, Miguel Sáenz y Cía, and the McAndrew & Cunningham were acquired or simply merged with the Robert McAndrew & Co, which thus underwent reorganization in 1872, and established a new subsidiary company in Seville: MacAndrews y Cía, led by Charles Eder y Gattrell. Cunningham was buried at the "English cemetery" that he had founded in 1855, where his burial mound stands out in a place of honor.

Throughout its history, the MacAndrews fleet had two different ships named "Juan Cunningham", with the first being an iron screw steamer built in 1871 and registered in Seville in 1872, while the second was launched in October 1883. On 11 December 1878, the steamship "Lavernock" collided with Juan Cunningham and sank in the Nervión at Portugalete.
