= Province of Seville =

Province of Spain

Province of Seville Provincia de Sevilla (Spanish)
- Province
- Flag Coat of arms

- Location of the Province of Seville in Spain
- Interactive map of Province of Seville
- Coordinates: 37°30′N 5°30′W
- Country: Spain
- Autonomous community: Andalusia
- Capital: Seville
- Municipalities: 106

Government
  - President: Fernando Rodríguez Villalobos (PSOE)

Area
  - Total: 14,035.69 km^{2} (5,419.21 sq mi)
  - Rank: 12th in Spain
- 2.8% of Spain

Population (2025)
  - Total: 1,977,664
  - Rank: 5th in Spain
  - Density: 140.9025/km^{2} (364.9358/sq mi)
- ISO 3166 code: ES-SE
- Official language(s): Spanish
- Parliament: Cortes Generales
- Website: www.dipusevilla.es

The Province of Seville (Spanish: Provincia de Sevilla) is a province of southern Spain, in the western part of the autonomous community of Andalusia. It borders the provinces of Málaga and Cádiz in the south, Huelva in the west, Badajoz in the north and Córdoba in the east. Seville is the province's as well as the Andalusian autonomous community's capital.

Located on the southern bank of the Guadalquivir river, the city of Seville is the largest one in Andalusia. The former province of Andalusia was divided by the Moors into four separate kingdoms—Seville, Cordova, Jaen and Granada. Seville has the highest GDP among the provinces of Andalusia . The Provinces of Málaga (€28,506 million) and Cadiz (€22,574 million) are 2nd and 3rd respectively. The Port of Seville is of great economic importance to the province. The capital city Seville is the world's most dense one in terms of Baroque churches.

It has a population of 1,977,664 in an area of 14,035.69 square kilometres (5,419.21 sq mi) across its 106 municipalities.

== Geography ==
The province shares the Parque Nacional de Doñana with Huelva province. It also has the Sierra Norte de Sevilla Natural Park. The 177,484 hectares park is Andalusia's largest protected area. The Guadalquivir crosses the province from east to west. Guadiana, Pinta and Xenil are other important rivers. The northern part of the province is mostly mountainous. Seville has a warm Mediterranean climate with an annual average temperature of 18.5 °C. Winters are generally mild while summers are hot. The maximum temperatures in summer often surpass 40 °C. The locality of Écija is popularly known as the "Frying Pan of Andalusia" for its torrid summers.

== Demographics ==
As of 2025, the population is 1,977,664, of which 48.8% are male, and 51.2% are female. Minors make up 17.8% of the population, and seniors make up 18.4%.

Historical population

Year	Pop.	±%
1842	369,054	—
1857	463,486	+25.6%
1877	499,548	+7.8%
1887	535,687	+7.2%
1900	552,455	+3.1%
1910	591,210	+7.0%
1920	704,344	+19.1%
1930	792,308	+12.5%
1940	957,362	+20.8%

Year	Pop.	±%
1950	1,101,595	+15.1%
1960	1,244,153	+12.9%
1970	1,336,669	+7.4%
1981	1,478,311	+10.6%
1991	1,619,703	+9.6%
2001	1,727,603	+6.7%
2011	1,930,941	+11.8%
2021	1,950,056	+1.0%

Source: INE

=== Immigration ===
As of 2025, immigrants make up 7.8% of the population. The 5 largest foreign countries of birth are Colombia, Morocco, Venezuela, Nicaragua, and Peru.

== Economy ==
Écija is known for its high value of corn production. The province of Seville generates 1.92% of the Spanish hotel movement. In terms of tourism, the city of Seville is one of the leading cities in Andalusia, situated behind Barcelona and Madrid on a national level.

In comparison to other Spanish provinces, Seville is underdeveloped.

== See also ==
- List of municipalities in Seville
