= First official football match in Spain =

First football match in Spain
- Event: Pioneering football in Spain
Sevilla FC	Recreativo de Huelva
(Spain)	(Spain)
2	0
- Date: 8 March 1890
- Venue: Hipódromo de Tablada, Seville
- Referee: Edward F. Johnston
- Attendance: 120

The first official football match in Spain between two sides playing under the rules of the English FA was contested between the two oldest clubs in Spain, Recreativo de Huelva and Sevilla FC, on 8 March 1890, held at the Hipódromo de Tablada in Seville.

All the players were British, except for two Spanish players on each team, Huelva's Guillermo Duclós and Coto, and Sevilla's Mandy and Isaias White, the latter being the club's secretary and the one who wrote the letter inviting Huelva for a match. Sevilla FC became the first team to ever win an organized match in Spanish football history with its 2–0 victory, thanks to goals by Rickson and "Clown Yugles", a player so-called due to his appearance on the pitch in "night dress".

== Other possible firsts ==
Modern football was introduced to Spain in the late 19th century by a combination of mostly British immigrant workers and visiting sailors. In 1873, a large group of British workers arrived in both Huelva and Vigo, two cities opened to the world through the sea and who had kept a close industrial relationship with Britain, which means that the first kick to a football ball on Spanish soil occurred in one of those cities. (Note: The investigations about which one was the dean of football in Spain remain inconclusive and open to debate by historians.) According to Spanish historian José Ramón Cabanelas, "the first football matches [in Spain] began to be played in Vigo as soon as the Cable Inglés arrived in May 1873", and indeed, this British colony was the first one to establish a football team in 1876, which played matches against the crews of the English ships that docked in the port of Vigo, which were held at El Relleno. In Huelva, on the other hand, a certain William Bice was the one who began organizing the first "kick-abouts" between the club's members, and this colony eventually founded the Rio Tinto English Club in 1878 (known in Huelva as Club Inglés Bella Vista), which had a football team known as Rio Tinto FC.

There are some other examples of football matches in Spain around this time; for instance, in Valladolid, the students of the Colegio de los Escoceses had already been playing football since 1875, and the students of both the Jesuit College of Nuestra Señora de la Antigua in Orduña and the Irish College in Salamanca had been doing so since 1878, but none of this football involved any club, official or otherwise. Furthermore, soldiers from the British colony of Gibraltar held football matches and training sessions in the neighbouring La Línea and San Roque in Cádiz, and there was even a team called "Benalife" made up of llanitos, which lost a match to a "British Navy XI" in January 1884; and two years earlier, on 6 May 1882, Daniel Macmillan Young, one of the RTCL mining employees, published an article about a football match between Rio Tinto FC and Huelva in the local English-language newspaper La Provincia; (Note: "We may have to wait for some time to witness another match as well organized and balanced; Rio Tinto had some tough players, but Huelva played with greater subtlety and craftiness, being on the attack throughout the game, but at the last minute it was Rio Tinto that netted the winning goal".) however, these teams were never officially established, so there is no legal record of their existence. The first legally established Spanish football club was the Cricket and Football Club of Madrid, founded in October 1879 under the protection of King Alfonso XII, but this short-lived entity was strictly reserved to the social elite, not to mention the inexistence of news about one specific football match played by its members.

Rio Tinto FC was the catalyst of the Sociedad de Juego de Pelota (Spanish: "Ball Game Society"), founded by William Alexander Mackay in 1884, which organized football games between the members of Rio Tinto and later against crews of English ships that docked in the port of Huelva, which took place in a large area of marshes filled with flooded soil, opposite to the Gas Factory run by fellow Scotsman Charles Wilson Adam. The earliest known example of this is March 1888, when the club played football and cricket matches against the sailors of a merchant ship called Jane Cory who had just arrived in port; Mackay even invited a Spaniard Ildefonso Martínez to play. Eventually, in the late 1880s, football started to gain some followers among the local youth, and as they became familiar with its rules, some of them asked Mackay to participate, which he happily accepted, as he did not conceive of his recreational club as something exclusive to the British colony. Ildefonso Martínez, José García Almansa, Alfonso Le Bourg, and some others, thus became the first Spaniards to play football.

== Background ==
The Sociedad de Juego de Pelota developed into the oldest official football club in Spain, Recreativo de Huelva, founded by William Alexander Mackay, the doctor of the Rio Tinto Company, Charles Wilson Adam, the owner of the land where the games were played. Just a month later, on 25 January 1890, Sevilla FC was founded by a group of young British residents in Seville, including Isaias White and Edward Farquharson Johnston.

Sevilla FC organized several "kick-abouts" between the club's members, usually a Sunday 70-minute five-a-side match, but as soon as they learned of the existence of a Recreation Club 80 miles away in Huelva, they decided to invite them for a football match. To that end, on 25 February 1890, Isaias White, the then secretary of Sevilla FC, wrote a letter to the president of the Huelva club, which was published three days later in the La Provincia, a now-extinct Huelva newspaper. A few days later, on 3 March, some members of the Recreation Club, which had never played a football match of any kind, gathered at the Hotel Colón, and ultimately decided to accept Sevilla's invitation.

== Squad ==
On the morning of 8 March 1890, 22 members of the Recreation Club took the mail train on a four-hour journey to Seville, arriving there in torrential rain. Huelva fielded the likes of George Wakelin, Guillermo Duclós, Benito Daniel, and captain William Alcock. On the other hand, Sevilla FC fielded a mixed team of workers from the Seville Water Works Company and Johnston's shipping company, including Rickson, W. Logan, White, Enrique Welton, and captain Hugh MacColl, a native from Glasgow who had come to Seville's Water Works as a marine engineer. All the players were British-born, mostly Scottish, except for two Spaniards on each team, Huelva's Duclós and Coto, and Sevilla's Mandy and White.

Regarding the equipment, Sevilla played in red and Huelva in blue, sept for Sevilla's left-winger, who had never belonged to any athletic club, stepped onto the pitch in a nightdress "in the shape of a fantastically patterned suit of pyjama". He was thus mocked with waves of laughter and shouts, being quickly nicknamed Clown Yugles, a reference to Clown Juggler, an infamous character from the circus world of Spain. The newspapers of the time do not reveal the identity of Yugles, but it mentions that he is from "our left-wing", and according with Sevilla's future line-ups against Huelva in the next two years, Isaias White and Welton are the only players who both played on 8 March and featured as left-wingers around that time (at the time, there was no such thing as wing-backs), and in fact, White is the son of the co-owner of the Portilla, White & Co., one of Spain's largest foundries at the time, and a rich man has a higher chance of being the one who usually sleeps with a fancy pyjama than not.

== Overview ==
The match took place at 16:45 on Saturday 8 March 1890 in a steady downpour, at the Tablada Hippodrome (horse racing track), also known as Hipódromo de la Sociedad de Carreras de Caballos, next to the Guadalquivir. The grass, now wet, had been marked with lines and at both ends of the meadow, the Seville players had placed three sticks to form the goals. Admission was free and there were around 120 spectators, mostly curious residents, and friends of the town's football players, most of whom arrived in horse-drawn carriages. The game was refereed by Sevilla's president Edward Johnston, who was also the British vice-council in Seville, who walked onto the pitch "while holding a piece of tanned calfskin, spherical in shape, sewn together with rough cords". He was assisted by a member of both clubs, who served as linesmen to help Johnston safeguard the rules of the English FA, and based in their future meetings in 1892, the Huelva linesman was most likely William Bice, an RTCL employee around the same age as Johnston.

The match lasted two halves of thirty-five minutes. Rickson and Yugles scored the only goals of the match as Sevilla claimed a historic 2–0 victory, thus winning the very first official match in the history of Spanish football. Recreativo's defeat was attributed to the fact that the Huelva team had never played together before, and had just returned from a four-hour train journey in that same morning, plus the match was refereed by the president of Sevilla.

== Final details ==
8 March 1890
16:45

Sevilla FC (Spain)	2–0	(Spain) Recreativo de Huelva
Ritson; Clown Yugles	Report1; Report2

Hipódromo de Tablada, Seville
Attendance: 120
Referee: Edward F. Johnston (Sevilla FC)

GK	1	(United Kingdom) Annodall
DF	2	(United Kingdom) Hugo MacColl (c)
DF	3	(Spain) Mandy
MF	4	(United Kingdom) Greig
MF	5	(Spain) Isaias White
MF	6	(United Kingdom) W. Logan
FW	7	(United Kingdom) Enrique Nicholson
FW	8	(United Kingdom) H. Stroneger
FW	9	(United Kingdom) Stugart
FW	10	(United Kingdom) Rickson
FW	11	(United Kingdom) Enrique Welton

GK	1	(United Kingdom) George Wakelin
DF	2	(United Kingdom) Kirk
DF	3	(United Kingdom) Curtis
MF	4	(Spain) Coto
MF	5	(Spain) Guillermo Duclós
MF	6	(United Kingdom) Geraldo Brady
FW	7	(United Kingdom) Yates
FW	8	(United Kingdom) Benito Daniel
FW	9	(United Kingdom) Gibbon
FW	10	(Republic of Ireland) William Alcock (c)
FW	11	(United Kingdom) Smith

(Note: There is no data on the exact position of each one on the field, so these line-ups are based on their future alignments from 1891 and 1892, and is therefore most likely incorrect.)

== Aftermath ==
After the match, Sevilla FC, in what the Brits dubbed as the third half, marked this historic occasion by holding a large banquet in the saloon of a Suizo restaurant called Café Seville, hence honoring their opponents and guests with dinner. However, Clown Yugles was further mocked after falling off his chair.

The game received a lot of international publicity, including a match chronicle in the 17 March issue of the Scottish newspaper The Dundee Courier, written by an anonymous journalist, who detailed the aspects of the game, including the type of equipment, the name of the referee, the result and the goalscorers. However, this was not the first chronicle of a football match played in Spain, since nine months earlier, on 29 June 1889 in Bilbao, two English teams (Barmston Rangers FC and a team of sailors from four different ships) played a charity match to raise funds for the widow of the Cymbeline crane manager.

Following the success of the first match, the clubs decided to play a return fixture three weeks later, on 7 April 1890, this time in Huelva, in front of a crowd of between 400 and 500. Sevilla FC opened the scoring after 25 minutes thanks to a goal from Gilbert Pollock, thus becoming the first-ever player to score an away goal on Spanish soil, but this time, however, Sevilla went on to lose as Huelva's side, fortified by "some athletes from the British colony of Rio-Tinto", fought back to win 2–1. According to Pedro Escartín, during this rematch "the mother of one of the Huelva players, upset with a blow they had given to his son, entered the field and hit the attacker with an umbrella, so Huelva was also the birthplace of the first, picturesque and harmless known assault on a football field". In total, they played six games between 1890 and 1893, home and away, in which they also fielded the likes of the Lindberg brothers (Hanaldo and Juan), William MacAndrews, Chabannan, Butler, and Félix Vázquez de Zafra, the latter being originally a member of the Huelva Recreation Club.

In December 2014, the American sports media ESPN stated that "The game they played was not the first but it might be the first full lineup we have, the first record of a big away day [for Huelva]". A plaque recently placed in Tablada has a memorial about this important football match.

== Disputes ==
On 3 May 1890, the Scottish newspaper Glasgow Evening Post stated: "It was the Astillero team that actually played the first game in Spain (about six months ago), and not the Seville team". This statement directly contradicts the report made by The Dundee Courier, which described the Seville match as "the first football match in Spain". Glasgow's remarks, however, turned out to be incorrect and it was most likely a result of a healthy rivalry between the Scottish communities in Spain regarding which one of them was the first to play football.

In November 2001, there was news about a spectacular discovery of football in Vilagarcía de Arousa in 1873, but the alleged discovery was later disproven; in fact, the "discovered" news supposedly appeared in a newspaper (El Eco Republicano de Santiago de Compostela) that never existed; this is a clear example of the interest of certain amateur historians in granting their clubs or towns the "deanery" of Spanish football.

== See also ==
- First football match in Portugal
- First football match in Sweden
- 1894 Bilbao students v British workers football match
- Football in Spain
