= Gilbert Pollock =

Scottish iron engineer, businessman and footballer

Personal information
- Full name: Gilbert Reid Pollock
- Date of birth: 24 August 1865
- Place of birth: Neilston, Glasgow
- Date of death: 26 May 1954 (aged 88)
- Place of death: London
- Position: Forward

Senior career*
Years	Team	Apps	(Gls)
1890	Sevilla FC	+1	(1)
- * Club domestic league appearances and goals

Gilbert Reid Pollock (24 August 1865 - 26 May 1954) was a Scottish iron engineer, businessman, and footballer who was a founder of Spanish club Sevilla FC and the author of the club's first-ever away goal.

== Early life ==
Gilbert Reid Pollock was born on 24 August 1865, in Carradale, Saddell. After completing his studies, he began gaining a reputation as an accomplished young engineer and, after achieving enough professional experience, moved to Seville towards the end of the 1880s, where he was employed at the engineering works of the Portilla White foundry in Seville.

Thanks to a strong commercial relationship with the United Kingdom, Seville became the home to a large British enclave, so once in the Andalusian capital, Pollock established connections not only with these people; mostly workers and directors of the shipping company MacAndrews, the Seville Water Works and the Portilla White foundry; but also with many locals.

== Playing career ==
On 25 January 1890, Pollock, together with some of his co-workers and fellow Seville residents of British origin, attended an old café to mark the traditional Scottish celebration of Burns Night. That same evening, after consuming some beers and becoming concerned about their physical health and lifestyle, Pollock and the others began discussing the proposal of forming an Athletics Association, but after a short debate, they instead founded Sevilla FC to organize football matches regularly in order to exercise and feel more at home. To that end, they drew up the rough articles and the constitution of Sevilla FC, doing it so while in a drunken state. They elected Edward F. Johnston, who was the British vice-council in Seville, as the club's first president, while his fellow "Glasgowian" and foundry colleague Hugh MacColl was named captain; it was also decided that this club should play under the rules of the English FA.

Wasting no time, Sevilla FC began organizing several "kickabout" matches between the club's members in a close by racecourse, where Pollock and the others would set up goalposts to play 70-minute five-a-side matches on Sundays, which at the time was a non-working day, although Pollock and the others were able to persuade their bosses to give them Saturday afternoons off. One of Pollock's colleagues in the Portilla White foundry, Isaías White Méndez, the then secretary of Sevilla FC, organized a match with a Recreation Club 80 miles away in Huelva, which took place on Saturday 8 March 1890, at the Hipódromo de Tablada (horse racing track). This match is now considered to be the first official football match in Spain, but Pollock missed this match for unknown reasons.

Following the success of the first match, the clubs decided to play a return fixture three weeks later, this time in Huelva, on 7 April 1890, this time in Huelva, in front of a crowd of between 400 and 500, and it was Pollock who scored the opening goal after 25 minutes, thus becoming the first-ever player to score an away goal on Spanish soil. This time, however, Sevilla went on to lose as Huelva's side, fortified by "some athletes from the British colony of Rio-Tinto", fought back to win 2–1.

== Later life ==
In 1896, Hugh MacColl, his former Portilla White colleague and Sevilla FC teammate, contacted Pollock to propose a business partnership following the sudden death of his first partner John T. Jameson. Pollock, moved north to Sunderland to join him and become a partner in the firm, which was renamed MacColl & Pollock, a marine engine building firm based at Wreath Quay, on the north side of the River Wear, near Wearmouth Bridge. This company was once a prosperous global enterprise, employing 500 men at its peak, and engining almost 400 vessels between 1896 and 1931. It was also probably the last engine-building company to be developed on the River Wear, building its last engine in 1930, with the firm dealing only with repairs until it closed in 1935.

During the company's early years, Pollock and MacColl were prominent members of the prestigious Wearside Golf Club, but never lost their passion for football, a sport that they promoted among their workers at Wreath Quay, where engineers, platers, and boilermakers formed different teams to compete against each other or against teams belonging to other Wearside firms. Sevilla's adopted colours, red and white stripes, are believed to have been taken from Sunderland AFC, since their former captain MacColl and one of their founding members Pollock were living there at the time. MacColl died in 1915, but Pollock continued managing the company until it closed in 1935, before retiring to the Isle of Man.

It remains unclear when he married Annie Blackwell of Hyde, Cheshire, but according to Pollock's obituary published in the Sunderland Echo on 27 May 1954, the couple shared a son and three daughters, including Bessie Reid Pollock (1895–1959), who married Andrew Common in 1923.

== Death ==
Widowed some years earlier, Pollock was living at the Fort Anne Hotel in Douglas when he died in 1954, aged 88, and was buried in Braddan Cemetery, where his grave can still be seen today. At first, it was not known where he had been buried, but his grave was finally found on the Isle of Man by the Sevilla club historian Javier Terenti, who had already found the gravestone of Edward F. Johnston in Elgin.
