= Port of Seville =

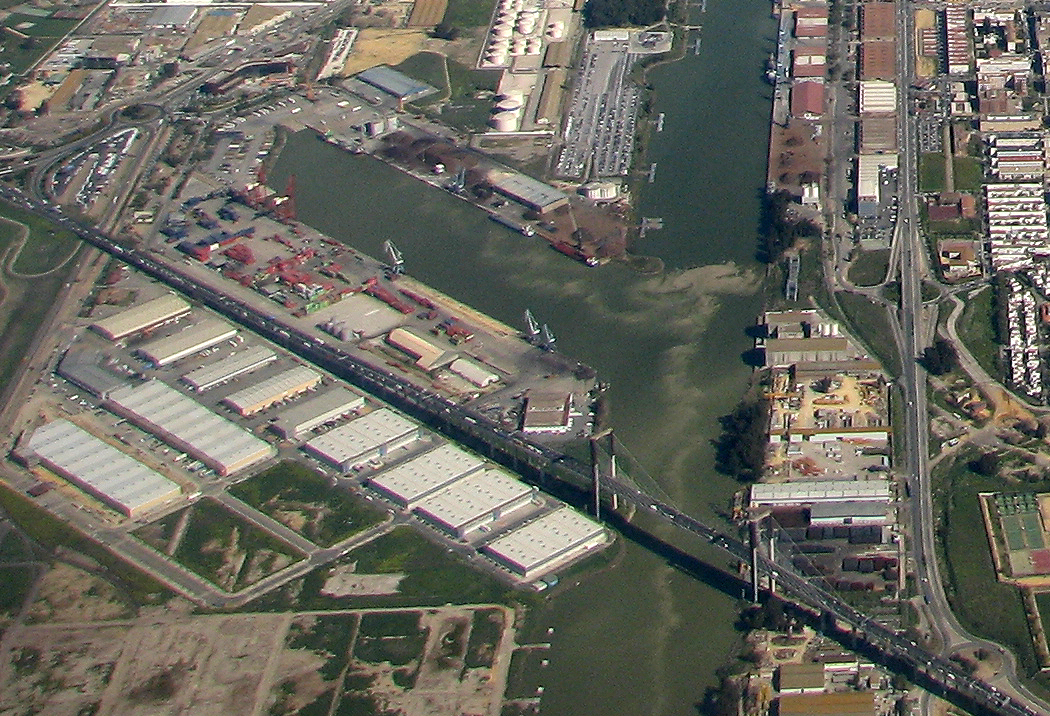
- The dársena del Batán
- Interactive map of Port of Seville

Location
- Country: Spain
- Location: Seville
- Coordinates: 37.353118°N 5.993956°W
- UN/LOCODE: ESSVQ

Details
- Operated by: Port Authority of Seville

The Port of Seville is a river port in Spain, located on the lower reaches of the Guadalquivir, in the city of Seville. It is the only commercial river port in the country.

== History ==
In the Early Modern Period Seville was chosen by the Catholic Monarchs as head port for the transatlantic routes to the New World. Historical and political factors played into the election, but the difficulties posed by the river vis-à-vis the navigation entailed Seville did not enjoy full exclusivity, and other ports placed in locations such as Sánlucar, Cádiz or the Canary Islands continued sending ships to the New World.

== Description ==
It is managed by the port authority of the same name. It has a dock for cruise ships, the Muelle de las Delicias. The dársena del Batán comprises two docks: the Centenario Dock (featuring a container terminal, a ro-ro ramp) and the Batán Norte Dock (also with a ro-ro ramp), both of them prepared for the charge and discharge of solid bulk. The Tablada dock in the Dársena de Alfonso XIII operates bulk cargo. Further dowstreams there is shipyard dock.
