= Hugh MacColl (footballer) =

Scottish marine engineer and footballer

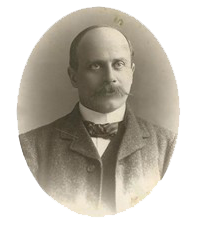

Personal information
- Date of birth: 30 June 1861
- Place of birth: Gorbals, Glasgow, Scotland
- Date of death: 31 August 1915 (aged 54)
- Place of death: Glasgow, Scotland
- Position: Defender

Senior career*
| Years | Team | Apps | (Gls) |
| 1890 | Sevilla FC | 1 | (0) |
- Club Atleta de los Astilleros del Nervión
- * Club domestic league appearances and goals

Hugh MacColl (30 June 1861 – 31 August 1915) was a Scottish marine engineer and footballer who was a founder and the first captain of Spanish club Sevilla FC, including in the first official football match in Spain.

== Early life ==
Hugh MacColl was born on 30 June 1861, in South Apsley Place street in the Gorbals district of Glasgow. In 1876, the 15-year-old MacColl became an apprentice engineer at Robert Napier & Sons on the Clyde. While employed there as a draftsman, he pursued further technical studies at Anderson's College (now the University of Strathclyde). After this, he became a draftsman at the Central Marine Engine Works at Hartlepool, a port town in County Durham, England; and then at Harland & Wolff in Belfast, before returning to Glasgow as a chief draftsman with James Howden & Co.

In 1889, MacColl was appointed technical manager of the engineering works of Portilla, White & Co., one of Spain's largest foundries, which was located in Seville. Thanks to a strong commercial relationship with the United Kingdom, Seville became the home to a large British enclave, so once he arrived in the Andalusian capital, MacColl established connections not only with these people; mostly workers and directors of the shipping company MacAndrews, the Seville Water Works and the Portilla White foundry; but also with many locals. In Spain, MacColl was known as "Don Hugo", and eventually, he changed his first name to Hugo, which he kept for the rest of his life.

== Playing career ==
A few months after his arrival, on 25 January 1890, MacColl, together with some of his waterworks co-workers and fellow Seville residents of British origin, attended an old café to mark the traditional Scottish celebration of Burns Night. That same evening, after consuming some beers and becoming concerned about their physical health and lifestyle, MacColl and the others began discussing the proposal of forming an Athletics Association, but after much discussion, they instead founded Sevilla FC to organize football matches regularly in order to exercise and feel more at home. To that end, they drew up the rough articles and the constitution of Sevilla FC, doing it so while in a drunken state. MacColl was elected as the club's first-ever captain while Edward F. Johnston, who was the British vice-council in Seville, was named president; it was also decided that this club should play under the rules of the English FA.

Wasting no time, Sevilla FC began organizing several "kickabout" matches between the club's members in a close by racecourse, where MacColl and the others would set up goalposts to play 70-minute five-a-side matches on Sundays, which at the time was a non-working day, although MacColl and the others were able to persuade their bosses to give them Saturday afternoons off. On 25 February 1890, one of MacColl's colleagues in the Portilla White foundry, Isaías White Méndez, the then secretary of Sevilla FC, organized a match with a Recreation Club 80 miles away in Huelva, which took place on Saturday 8 March 1890, at the Hipódromo de Tablada (horse racing track). This match is now considered to be the first official football match in Spain, which means that Hugo MacColl, who played in this match not only as a defender, but most importantly, as Sevilla FC's captain, was the first official captain in Spanish football history alongside Huelva's unknown captain.

In 1894, another Hugh McColl travelled to Santiago in Chile where he was a player and trainer of the city's first representative team, but this was a different man despite the similarity in name. This Hugh McColl travelled back and forth from the UK to Chile over the next decade and a half.

== Later life ==
MacColl remained in Seville for six years, from 1889 until 1895, when he returned to Britain, settling in Sunderland, where in early 1895, he partnered with John T. Jameson, a former colleague at a Hartlepool engine firm, to reopen the engineering workshops at Wreath Quay, on the north side of the River Wear, near Wearmouth Bridge. They then adapted the premises for the marine engine business and the construction and repair of boilers, thus founding the Jameson & MacColl, a marine engine building firm, but only two engine contracts were secured by the firm before Jameson's sudden death in July 1896, at the age of 35, leaving a widow and four young children.

Following Jameson's death, MacColl turned to another old pal, his fellow Sevilla FC founding member Gilbert Reid Pollock, who was a businessman and engineering expert, and who came across from Manchester to become a partner in the firm, which was renamed MacColl & Pollock. This company was once a prosperous global enterprise, employing 500 men at its peak, and engining almost 400 vessels between 1896 and 1931. It was also probably the last engine-building company to be developed on the River Wear, building its last engine in 1930, with the firm dealing only with repairs until it closed in 1935.

During the company's early years, MacColl and Pollock were prominent members of the prestigious Wearside Golf Club, but never lost their passion for football, a sport that they promoted among their workers at Wreath Quay, where engineers, platers, and boilermakers formed different teams to compete against each other or against teams belonging to other Wearside firms. In 1908, MacColl and Pollock were contacted by Sevilla FC regarding the purchase of new red and white shirts based on Sunderland AFC for a charity match against Recreativo de Huelva, meant to help the victims of the bloody 1908 Messina earthquake; the two of them gladly provided these shirts for the equipment, tasking John Wood, one of Sevilla's British members and captain of the SS Cordova, a steamship based in Sunderland, with taking the shirts to Seville.

He was also a member of the Institution of Naval Architects, the Institution of Engineers and Shipbuilders, and the North-East Institution of Engineers and Shipbuilders.

== Personal life ==
In 1901 he married Maude McCarthy (1868–1920), daughter of the ship owner George Eugene McCarthy and granddaughter of the comedian and Drury Lane actor-manager Eugene McCarthy. The couple had two children, Hugh Geoffrey MacColl (1902–1947) and James MacColl (1908–1971), who was Mayor of Paddington from 1947 to 1949 and a Labour member of parliament (MP) for Widnes from 1950 to 1971.

== Death ==
Although he ran the successful marine engine company on Wearside, MacColl perished in Glasgow, dying suddenly in the Central Station Hotel on 31 August 1915 while on holiday in his hometown. He was just 54 and had amassed a fortune of over £14,600. At first, it was not known where he had been buried, but his grave was finally found in 2015 by the Sevilla club historian Javier Terenti, who had already found the gravestones of Edward F. Johnston in Elgin and Pollock on the Isle of Man. In 2015, after years of looking for his grave, Terenti discovered some references in his wife's personal correspondence, according to which "Hugh MacColl was most probably buried in Cathcart Cemetery", so he followed that up with East Renfrewshire Council, who manage the cemetery, who were able to not only pinpointed the lair and take photographs of his gravestones.

== Legacy ==
In 2007, Sevilla FC won their second UEFA Cup in Glasgow after defeating RCD Espanyol on penalties in the final. Javier Terenti later said that this was "sort of tribute to our club's first captain".
