= 1911–12 FC Barcelona season =

13th season in existence of FC Barcelona

FC Barcelona
1911–12 season
- President: Joan Gamper
- Manager: William Lambe (until January)
- Campionat de Catalunya: Third
- Campionat d'Espanya: Champion
- Pyrenees Cup: Winner

The 1911–12 season was the 13th season for FC Barcelona.

== Summary ==
Barcelona secured the second double in a row after clinched the Copa del Rey and Pyrenees Cup, losing that season's Catalan championship to RCD Espanyol. Barça won the 1912 Pyrenees Cup after beating Stade Bordelais 5–3 with a hat-trick from Antonio Morales. Meanwhile, in the 1913 UECF Copa del Rey Final, Barcelona needed three games to beat Real Sociedad as both legs ended with a draw (2–2 and 0–0), and then beat 2–1 in the play-off with goals from Berdié and new-signing Apolinario Rodríguez.

== Squad ==
Note: Flags indicate national team as defined under FIFA eligibility rules; some limited exceptions apply. Players may hold more than one non-FIFA nationality.

No.	Pos.	Nation	Player
83	GK	ESP	Luis Renyé
95	GK	ESP	Lisard Peris
67	DF	ESP	José Irízar
77	DF	PHI	Manuel Amechazurra
88	DF	ESP	Juan Barba
88	DF	ESP	Áureo Comamala
98	MF	GER	Walter Rositzky
55	MF	ESP	Alfredo Massana
80	MF	ESP	Enrique Peris
62	MF	ESP	José Berdié
87	MF	ENG	Jack Greenwell

No.	Pos.	Nation	Player
—	MF	ENG	William Lambe
—	FW	ESP	Romà Forns
—	FW	ESP	Pepe Rodriguez
—	FW	ESP	Antonio Morales
—	FW	SCO	Alexander Steel
—	FW	SCO	George Pattullo
—	FW	SUI	Bernhard Staub
—	FW	ESP	Domingo Espelta
—	FW	ESP	Joan Llonch
—	FW	ESP	Pakán
—	FW	ESP	Francisco Estévez
—	FW	PHI	Paulino Alcántara

== Results ==
Friendlies

23 July 1911	Real Sociedad	2 - 1	FC Barcelona	San Sebastián
	Goal		Comamala	Stadium: Ondarreta Stadium; Referee: Enrique Alegre

25 July 1911	Real Sociedad	1 - 1	FC Barcelona	San Sebastián
	Goal		Pepe Rodriguez	Stadium: Ondarreta Stadium; Referee: Enrique Alegre

13 August 1911	FC Barcelona	4 - 1	Exmouth	Barcelona
	C. Comamala; Peris; A. Comamala		Goal	Stadium: Camp de la Indústria; Referee: John Hamilton

27 August 1911	FC Barcelona	2 - 0	FC Numància	Barcelona
	C. Comamala; C. Wallace			Stadium: Camp de la Indústria; Referee: Balat

10 September 1911	FC Barcelona	7 - 2	Veterans	Barcelona
	C. Comamala; C. Wallace; Forns; Peris			Stadium: Espanyol; Referee: Gmelin

1 October 1911	FC Barcelona	3 - 0	FC Espanya	Barcelona
	P. Wallace; Staub			Stadium: Camp de la Indústria; Referee: Hodge

15 October 1911	FC Barcelona	2 - 1	Universitary SC	Barcelona
	C. Wallace; Pepe Rodríguez			Stadium: Camp de la Indústria; Referee: Ángel Ponz

29 October 1911	FC Barcelona	0 - 1	Real Sociedad	Barcelona
				Stadium: Camp de la Indústria; Referee: Hodge

1 November 1911	FC Barcelona	0 - 3	Real Sociedad	Barcelona
				Stadium: Camp de la Indústria; Referee: Hodge

24 December 1911	FC Barcelona	3 - 1	Seleccio Madrilenya	Barcelona
	Staub; A. Massana			Stadium: Camp de la Indústria; Referee: John Hamilton

26 December 1911	FC Barcelona	3 - 3	Seleccio Madrilenya	Barcelona
	Staub; Llonch; Pepe Rodríguez			Stadium: Camp de la Indústria; Referee: Gmelin

31 December 1911	FC Barcelona	5 - 1	Stade Etoile Bleue	Barcelona
	Forns; A. Massana; Pepe Rodríguez; Staub			Stadium: Camp de la Indústria; Referee: Torrens

6 January 1912	FC Barcelona	5 - 1	United Hospitals	Barcelona
	Pepe Rodríguez; Staub; A. Massana			Stadium: Camp de la Indústria; Referee: John Hamilton

7 January 1912	FC Barcelona	1 - 1	United Hospitals	Barcelona
	Forns			Stadium: Camp de la Indústria; Referee: John Hamilton

16 February 1912	FC Barcelona	3 - 3	Tennistes	Barcelona
	Steel; A. Morales			Stadium: Camp de la Indústria; Referee: Walter Rositzky

18 February 1912	FC Barcelona	3 - 2	FC Espanya	Barcelona
	Steel; Summer			Stadium: Camp de la Indústria; Referee: Ros

3 March 1912	FC Barcelona	7 - 0	Tennistes	Barcelona
	Pepe Rodríguez; Arrnet; Summer			Stadium: Camp de la Indústria; Referee: Oliver

12 April 1912	FC Barcelona	1 - 2	New Crusaders	Barcelona
	Steel			Stadium: Camp de la Indústria; Referee: Gmelin

14 April 1912	FC Barcelona	1 - 3	New Crusaders	Barcelona
	Pepe Rodríguez			Stadium: Camp de la Indústria; Referee: Hodge

21 April 1912	FC Barcelona	0 - 3	Universitary SC	Barcelona
				Stadium: Camp de la Indústria; Referee: La Riva

28 April 1912	FC Barcelona	1 - 3	FC Espanya	Barcelona
	Harrison			Stadium: Camp de la Indústria; Referee: Just

26 May 1912	FC Barcelona	3 - 0	Stade Helvetique Marsella	Barcelona
	Forns; A. Massana; Steel			Stadium: Camp de la Indústria; Referee: John Hamilton

27 May 1912	FC Barcelona	2 - 2	Stade Helvetique Marsella	Barcelona
	Steel			Stadium: Camp de la Indústria; Referee: John Hamilton

23 June 1912	Real Sociedad	1 - 2	FC Barcelona	San Sebastián
			A. Morales; Steel	Stadium: Atotxa Stadium; Referee: Angoso

24 June 1912	Real Sociedad	4 - 1	FC Barcelona	San Sebastián
			Pepe Rodríguez	Stadium: Atotxa Stadium; Referee: Angoso

Copa Canaletes

?? September 1911	FC Barcelona	5 - 0¹	Salut SC	Barcelona
				Stadium: ?

8 December 1911	FC Barcelona	4 - 0²	FC Espanya	Barcelona
				Stadium: ?

10 December 1911	FC Barcelona	5 - 1	FC Numància	Barcelona
				Stadium: ?

- 1.2. Barcelona played with 10 players

Copa Ciudad-La Riva

24 March 1912	FC Barcelona	0 - 1	RCD Espanyol	Barcelona
				Stadium: Camp de la Indústria; Referee: Scherb

25 March 1912	RCD Espanyol	4 - 0	FC Barcelona	Barcelona
				Stadium: Espanyol; Referee: Scherb

Campionat de Catalunya

19 November 1911 Match 1	FC Barcelona	17 - 1	Català SC	Barcelona
	Pepe Rodríguez; Staub; Rositzky		Goal	Stadium: Camp de la Indústria; Referee: Fontana

26 November 1911 Match 2	FC Barcelona	0 - 0	Universitary SC	Barcelona
				Stadium: Camp de la Indústria; Referee: John Hamilton

17 December 1911 Match 3	FC Barcelona	1 - 2	FC Espanya	Barcelona
	Staub		Passani; Ramírez	Stadium: Camp de la Indústria; Referee: Emilio Sampere

14 January 1912 Match 4	FC Barcelona	12 - 0	FC Numancia	Barcelona
	Staub; Amechazurra; Pepe Rodríguez; Forns			Stadium: Camp de la Indústria

21 January 1912 Match 5	FC Barcelona	1 - 1	CD Espanyol	Barcelona
	Staub		P. Wallace	Stadium: Camp de la Indústria; Referee: John Hamilton

25 February 1912 Match 6	Català SC	0 - 9	FC Barcelona	Barcelona
			Alcántara; Summer; Espelta; A. Massana	Stadium: Velòdrom de la Bonanova; Referee: John Hamilton

12 May 1912 Match 7	FC Numancia	2 - 9	FC Barcelona	Barcelona
	Goal		Steel; A. Morales; Forns	Referee: Torres

19 May 1912 Match 8	Universitary SC	1 - 4	FC Barcelona	Barcelona
	Aguirreche		A. Morales; Massana; Pepe Rodríguez; Steel	Stadium: Camp de l'Hospital Clínic; Referee: Clements

2 June 1912 Match 9	FC Espanya	2 - 7	FC Barcelona	Barcelona
18:00	Olivé; Casellas		Pepe Rodríguez; Steel; A. Morales; Mariné (o.g.)	Stadium: Camp del carrer Entença/València; Referee: Frank Allack

7 July 1912 Match 10	CD Espanyol	Awarded to Barça	FC Barcelona	Barcelona
				Stadium: Velòdrom Parc d'Sports

6 October 1912 Play-off	FC Espanya	punts cedits	FC Barcelona	Barcelona
				Stadium: Camp de l'Hospital Clínic; Referee: John Hamilton

Copa del Rey

31 March 1912 Semifinals	FC Barcelona	3 - 0	FC Espanya	Barcelona
	Massana; Pepe Rodríguez; Estévez			Stadium: Camp de la Indústria; Referee: Kindelan (Madrid)

7 April 1912 Final	FC Barcelona	2 - 0	Sociedad Gimnástica	Barcelona
	Massana 43'; Pepe Rodríguez 85'			Stadium: Camp de la Indústria; Referee: John Hamilton (Catalonia)

Pyrenees Cup

10 March 1912 Semifinals	FC Barcelona	3 - 2	CD Espanyol	Barcelona
	Pattullo; Steel		Burnett; Hodge	Referee: John Hamilton (Catalonia)

5 May 1912 Final	FC Barcelona	5 - 3	Stade Bordealis UC	Tolosa de Llenguadoc
	A. Morales 45'; Massana; Pepe Rodríguez		p.p.	Referee: Ginesty
