= 1910–11 FC Barcelona season =

12th season in existence of FC Barcelona

FC Barcelona
1910–11 season
- President: Joan Gamper
- Campionat de Catalunya: First
- Campeonato de España: Withdrawn of quarter final
- Pyrenees Cup: Winner
Home colours	Away colours

The 1910–11 season was the 12th season for FC Barcelona.

== Squad ==
Note: Flags indicate national team as defined under FIFA eligibility rules; some limited exceptions apply. Players may hold more than one non-FIFA nationality.

No.	Pos.	Nation	Player
83	GK	ESP	Joan Solà
95	GK	ESP	Lluís Renyé
99	GK	ESP	Lisard Peris
67	DF	ESP	Francisco Bru
77	DF	PHI	Manuel Amechazurra
88	DF	ESP	Áureo Comamala
98	MF	ESP	Enric Peris
55	MF	ESP	Joan Grau
80	MF	ESP	Arsenio Comamala
62	MF	ESP	Josep Quirante
87	MF	ESP	Joan Janer

No.	Pos.	Nation	Player
—	MF	ESP	Miquel Mensa
—	MF	ESP	Pere Ponsà
—	FW	ESP	Romà Forns
—	FW	ENG	Charles Wallace
—	FW	ENG	Percival Wallace
—	FW	ESP	Carles Comamala
—	FW	SCO	George Pattullo
—	FW	ESP	Domingo Espelta
—	FW	ESP	Antonio Llonch
—	FW	ESP	Pepe Rodríguez
—	FW	ESP	Domingo Arrillaga

== Results ==
Friendly

28 August 1910	Futbol Club Espanya	4 – 2	FC Barcelona	Barcelona
			C. Comamala; Peris	Stadium: Espanya; Referee: Rodriguez

1 September 1910	FC Barcelona	2 – 5	British Mediterranean Fleet	Barcelona
		Report		Stadium: Camp de la Indústria

12 September 1910	FC Barcelona	2 – 5	Esquadra Anglesa	Barcelona
	Rodriguez			Stadium: Camp de la Indústria; Referee: Hamilton

2 October 1910	FC Barcelona	4 – 2	Futbol Club Espanya	Barcelona
	Pattullo; Rodriguez; A.Comamala			Stadium: Camp de la Indústria; Referee: Hamilton

9 October 1910	FC Barcelona	15 – 1	FC Internacional	Barcelona
	Pattullo; Forns; Rodriguez; P.Wallace			Stadium: Camp de la Indústria

16 October 1910	RCD Espanyol	1 – 4	FC Barcelona	Barcelona
			Pattullo; Rodriguez; P.Wallace	Stadium: Espanyol; Referee: Hamilton

23 October 1910	Universitary SC	2 – 4	FC Barcelona	Barcelona
			C.Comamala; Rodriguez; P.Wallace	Stadium: Universitary; Referee: Balat

30 October 1910	FC Barcelona	8 – 1	Stade Toulousain	Barcelona
	Pattullo; P.Wallace; C.Wallace; Rodriguez; C.Comamala			Stadium: Camp de la Indústria; Referee: Witty

1 November 1910	FC Barcelona	5 – 0	FC Català	Barcelona
	C.Comamala; P.Wallace; Rodriguez			Stadium: Camp de la Indústria; Referee: Forns

20 November 1910	FC Barcelona	6 – 0	FC Català	Barcelona
	P.Wallace; Pattullo; A.Comamala			Stadium: Carrer Marina; Referee: Torres

27 November 1910	Universitary SC	2 – 4	FC Barcelona	Barcelona
			C.Wallace; P.Wallace; Rodriguez	Stadium: Universitary; Referee: Sampere

25 December 1910	FC Barcelona	5 – 2	RS Gimnástica Española	Barcelona
	P.Wallace; C.Comamala; Pattullo			Stadium: Camp de la Indústria; Referee: Moris

26 December 1910	FC Barcelona	4 – 2	RS Gimnástica Española	Barcelona
	P.Wallace; C.Comamala; Pattullo			Stadium: Camp de la Indústria; Referee: Moris

1 January 1911	FC Barcelona	5 – 0	Stade Etoile Bleue	Barcelona
	P.Wallace; Pattullo			Stadium: Camp de la Indústria; Referee: Sanchez

6 January 1911	FC Barcelona	0 – 4	United Hospitals RFC	Barcelona
				Stadium: Camp de la Indústria; Referee: Hamilton

2 February 1911	CE Sabadell FC	0 – 10	FC Barcelona	Sabadell
			C.Comamala; Llonch; Janer; Forns	Referee: Gamper

19 March 1911	FC Barcelona	6 – 0	FC Català	Barcelona
	P.Wallace; Forns; Guardiola; С.Wallace			Stadium: Camp de la Indústria; Referee: Gruelin

20 April 1911	FC Barcelona	1 – 3	New Crusaders FC	Barcelona
	C.Comamala			Stadium: Camp de la Indústria; Referee: Gmelin

23 April 1911	FC Barcelona	0 – 2	New Crusaders FC	Barcelona
				Stadium: Camp de la Indústria; Referee: Hamilton

21 May 1911	FC Barcelona	5 – 1^{1}	FC Català	Barcelona
	P.Wallace; С.Wallace; С.Comamala			Stadium: Camp de la Indústria; Referee: Sanchez

4 June 1911	Hispania Valencia	0 – 6	FC Barcelona	València
			P.Wallace; С.Wallace; Peris	Referee: Carranza

11 June 1911	FC Barcelona	6 – 1^{2}	FC Català	Barcelona
	C.Comamala; Quirante; A.Comamala; С.Wallace			Stadium: Camp de la Indústria; Referee: Gamper

Copa Paris-Barcelona

24 September 1910	FC Barcelona	1 – 1	RCD Espanyol	Barcelona
	Pattullo			Stadium: Placa d'Armes del Parc; Referee: Hamilton

25 September 1910	FC Barcelona	1 – 1	RCD Espanyol	Barcelona
	Arrillaga			Stadium: Placa d'Armes del Parc; Referee: Hamilton

- La Copa Paris-Barcelona, organitzada per l'Ajuntament de Barcelona, va quedar sense adjudicar.

6 November 1910	FC Barcelona	4 – 0 desempat	RCD Espanyol	Barcelona
	Pattullo; Rodriguez			Stadium: Placa d'Armes del Parc; Referee: Hamilton

Concurs Espanya

16 November 1910 d arrer partit	FC Barcelona	4 – 1	RCD Espanyol	Barcelona
	Pattullo; Rodriguez			Stadium: Espanya; Referee: Hamilton

Campionat de Catalunya

11 December 1910 Jornada 1	FC Barcelona	4 – 3	Universitary SC	Barcelona
	Pattullo; Forns; C. Comamala		Roteta; Torrens; Barenys	Stadium: Camp de la Indústria; Referee: Ponz Junyent

18 December 1910 Jornada 2	CD Español	0 – 4	FC Barcelona	Barcelona
15:20			P. Wallace; E. Peris; Pattullo	Stadium: Camp de la Indústria; Referee: Garriga

8 January 1911 Jornada 3	FC Espanya	2 – 4	FC Barcelona	Barcelona
	Doval		Pattullo; P. Wallace	Stadium: Camp del carrer Entença/València; Referee: Morris

22 January 1911 Jornada 5	Català SC	1 – 3	FC Barcelona	Barcelona
	Goal		Pattullo; C. Wallace	Stadium: Velòdrom de la Bonanova; Referee: Lloret

5 February 1911 Jornada 6	Universitary SC	0 – 4	FC Barcelona	Barcelona
16:40			P. Wallace; C. Comamala	Stadium: Camp de l'Hospital Clínic; Referee: Balat

19 February 1911 Jornada 7	FC Barcelona	6 – 0	FC Espanya	Barcelona
15:20	Pattullo; C. Wallace			Stadium: Camp de la Indústria; Referee: Hamilton

12 March 1911 Jornada 8	FC Barcelona	3 – 1	CD Español	Barcelona
	C. Wallace; P. Wallace		A. Massana	Stadium: Camp de la Indústria; Referee: Beltri

30 April 1911 Jornada 9	FC Barcelona	2 – 1	Català SC	Barcelona
	Goal		Goal	Stadium: Camp de la Indústria

Torneig a fovor de la Creu Roja

5 March 1911	FC Barcelona	1 – 0^{1}	Universitary SC	Barcelona
	C.Comamala			Stadium: Espanyol; Referee: Rodriguez

5 March 1911	RCD Espanyol	2 – 1^{2}	FC Barcelona	Barcelona
			C.Comamala	Stadium: Espanyol; Referee: Torrens

1. 2. Els partits d'aquest torneig tenien una durada de 30 minuts i els equips s'havien limitat a 7 jugadors.

Campeonato de España

12 April 1911 Quarts de final	FC Barcelona	4 – 0	RS Gimnástica Española	Getxo
	P. Wallace; Pattullo			Stadium: Jolaseta

- El Barcelona es va retirar, al ser obligat a repetir el partit per una supposada alineació indeguda. La diferència amb el tracte rebut per altres equips en situacions més punibles, va fer que l'equip es retirés de la competició.

Copa dels Pirineus

7 May 1911 Semifinals	FC Barcelona	2 – 1	Olympique Cettois	Barcelona
	C. Comamala		Goal	Stadium: Camp de la Indústria; Referee: Labat

14 May 1911 Final	FC Barcelona	4 – 2	Bons Gars de Bordeaux	Tolosa de Llenguadoc
	P. Wallace; C. Wallace; C. Comamala		Mauret; Lucas	Referee: Labat
