= 1909–10 FC Barcelona season =

11th season in existence of FC Barcelona

FC Barcelona
1909–10 season
- President: Otto Gmeling
- Campeonato de España: Champions
- Campionat de Catalunya: First
- Pyrenees Cup: Winner
Home colours	Away colours

The 1909–10 season was the 11th season for FC Barcelona.

== Squad ==
Note: Flags indicate national team as defined under FIFA eligibility rules; some limited exceptions apply. Players may hold more than one non-FIFA nationality.

No.	Pos.	Nation	Player
—	GK	ESP	Joan Solà
—	GK	ESP	Lisard Peris
—	DF	PHI	Manuel Amechazurra
—	DF	ESP	Francisco Bru
—	DF	SUI	Ernst-Alfred Thalmann
—	DF	ESP	Áureo Comamala
—	MF	ESP	Enric Peris
—	MF	ESP	Joan Grau
—	MF	ESP	Arsenio Comamala
—	MF	ESP	Felip Janer
—	MF	ESP	Francesc Sanz
—	MF	ESP	Leandro Aguirreche

No.	Pos.	Nation	Player
—	MF	ARG	Mariano Bori
—	FW	ESP	Romà Forns
—	FW	ESP	Carles Comamala
—	FW	ENG	Charles Wallace
—	FW	ESP	Antonio Llonch
—	FW	ESP	Pepe Rodríguez
—	FW	ESP	Macià
—	FW	ESP	Domingo Espelta
—	FW	ESP	Ricard Graells
—	FW	ESP	Claudi Puigvert
—	FW	ENG	Percival Wallace
—	FW	GER	Udo Steinberg

== Results ==
Friendly

8 August 1909	FC Barcelona	2 – 0	FC Central	Barcelona
	C. Wallace; C. Comamala			Stadium: Camp del carrer Indústria; Referee: Doncos

12 September 1909	FC Espanya	0 – 7	FC Barcelona	Barcelona
			C. Comamala; С.Wallace; Steinberg; Forns	Stadium: Espanya; Referee: Llonch

19 September 1909	FC Barcelona	2 – 1	FC Espanya	Barcelona
	C. Comamala			Stadium: Industria; Referee: Ponz

23 September 1909	AUF Tarragona	1 – 7	FC Barcelona	Barcelona
			C. Comamala; С.Wallace; Forns	Stadium: Tarragona; Referee: Tarin

31 October 1909	Stade Helvetique Marsella	5 – 1	FC Barcelona	Franca
			C. Comamala	Stadium: Marsella; Referee: Diss [Franca]

1 November 1909	Olympique Cettois	1 – 4	FC Barcelona	Franca
			Bru; C. Comamala; Forns	Stadium: Cette; Referee: Diffre [Franca]

26 December 1909	FC Barcelona	3 – 1	Olympique Cettois	Barcelona
	C. Wallace; Forns			Stadium: Camp del carrer Indústria; Referee: Mattias

2 January 1910	FC Barcelona	5 – 3	Sociedad Gimnastica Espanola	Barcelona
	C. Wallace; C.Comamala; Peris			Stadium: Camp del carrer Indústria; Referee: Witty

31 January 1910	Olympique Cettois	0 – 4	FC Barcelona	Franca
			C. Wallace; C.Comamala; Forns	Stadium: Perpinya; Referee: Naudin [Franca]

9 February 1910	FC Barcelona	3 – 2	Select Catalonia	Barcelona
	C. Wallace; C.Comamala			Stadium: Camp del carrer Indústria; Referee: Hamilton

28 March 1910	FC Barcelona	3 – 3	Club Español de Madrid	Barcelona
	Janer; Muller equip contrari			Stadium: Camp del carrer Indústria; Referee: Witty

5 May 1910	FC Barcelona	11 – 0	Universitari	Barcelona
	C.Comamala; С.Wallace; Rodriguez; Forns			Stadium: Camp del carrer Indústria; Referee: Witty

8 May 1910	FC Barcelona	4 – 0	Sporting Club Nimes	Barcelona
	P.Wallace; Forns			Stadium: Figueres; Referee: Canals

15 May 1910	FC Barcelona	1 – 2	Stade Helvetique Marsella	Barcelona
	C.Comamala			Stadium: Industria; Referee: Canals

5 June 1910	FC Barcelona	4 – 1	Cardiff Corinthians	Barcelona
	C.Comamala; Peris			Stadium: Placa d'Armes del Parc; Referee: Roberts

19 June 1910	FC Barcelona	6 – 2	RCD Espanyol	Barcelona
	C.Comamala; Rodriguez; P.Wallace; Amechazurra			Stadium: Industria; Referee: Hamilton

Concurs Espanya

26 September 1909	FC Barcelona	7 – 0	Universitari	Barcelona
	C. Wallace; Carlos Comamala; Forns			Stadium: Espanya; Referee: Llonch

17 October 1909	FC Barcelona	6 – 1	Català SC	Barcelona
	Bru; Carlos Comamala; C.Wallace			Stadium: Espanya; Referee: Matarrodona

7 November 1909	FC Espanya	1 – 3	FC Barcelona	Barcelona
			Macia; Carlos Comamala	Stadium: Espanya; Referee: Darne

Campionat de Catalunya

5 December 1909 Jornada 3	FC Barcelona	8 – 1	Català SC	Barcelona
	C. Wallace; C. Comamala; E. Peris		Goal	Stadium: Camp del carrer Indústria; Referee: Pàmies

12 December 1909 Jornada 4	FC Barcelona	1 – 0	CD Español	Barcelona
	C. Comamala			Stadium: Camp del carrer Indústria; Referee: Rué

19 December 1909 Jornada 5	FC Barcelona	5 – 1	FC Espanya	Barcelona
	C. Wallace; C. Comamala; Forns; Llonch		Goal	Stadium: Camp del carrer Indústria; Referee: Doncos

2 January 1910 Jornada 6	Star FC	0 – 8	FC Barcelona	Barcelona
			C. Comamala; C. Wallace	Referee: Doncos

16 January 1910 Jornada 7	FC Barcelona	12 – 0	FC Central	Barcelona
	Forns; C. Comamala; C. Wallace; Llonch			Stadium: Camp del carrer Indústria; Referee: Witty

23 January 1910 Jornada 8	FC Barcelona	1 – 0	Universitary SC	Barcelona
	C. Wallace			Stadium: Camp del carrer Indústria; Referee: Vinyes

27 February 1910 Jornada 11	Català SC	1 – 10	FC Barcelona	Barcelona
	Goal		C. Comamala; C. Wallace; Macià	Stadium: Camp del carrer Indústria; Referee: Torrens

20 March 1910 Jornada 14	FC Barcelona	not play	Star FC	Barcelona
				Stadium: Camp del carrer Indústria

27 March 1910 Jornada 15	FC Central	0 – 10	FC Barcelona	Barcelona

3 April 1910 Jornada 16	Universitary SC	0 – 1	FC Barcelona	Barcelona
			Forns	Stadium: Camp de l'Hospital Clínic; Referee: Doncos

17 April 1910 Jornada 13	FC Espanya	not play	FC Barcelona	Barcelona
				Stadium: Camp del carrer Entença/València

12 June 1910 Jornada 12	CD Español	not play	FC Barcelona	Barcelona
17:30				Stadium: Camp del carrer Marina

Campeonato de España

24 May 1910 Jornada 1	FC Barcelona	5 – 0	RC Deportivo de La Coruña	Madrid
	P.Wallace; C. Comamala; Forns; C. Wallace; Rodríguez			Stadium: Campo de Tiro de Pichón; Referee: Kindelan (Madrid)

26 May 1910 Jornada 3	FC Barcelona	3 – 2	Club Español de Madrid	Madrid
20:30	C. Wallace 58'; C. Comamala 70'; Rodríguez 89'		Álvarez Buylla 5' 12'	Stadium: Campo de Tiro de Pichón; Referee: Lemmel (Madrid)

Copa dels Pirineus

24 April 1910 Semifinals	Olympique Cettois	1 – 1	FC Barcelona	Seta
	Allias		Graells	Referee: Labat

1 May 1910 Final	FC Barcelona	2 – 1	Real Sociedad de Fútbol	Tolosa de Llenguadoc
	Graells; Rodríguez		Prast	Referee: Labat
