= 1913–14 FC Barcelona season =

15th season in existence of FC Barcelona

FC Barcelona
1912–13 season
- President: Francesc de Moxó
- Manager: Jack Greenwell
- Campionat de Catalunya: Fourth
- Pyrenees Cup: Semifinal

The 1913–14 season was the 15th season for FC Barcelona.

== Squad ==
Note: Flags indicate national team as defined under FIFA eligibility rules; some limited exceptions apply. Players may hold more than one non-FIFA nationality.

No.	Pos.	Nation	Player
83	GK	(Spain) ESP	Luis Bru
95	GK	(Spain) ESP	Luis Renyé
99	GK	(Spain) ESP	Francisco Aramburo
67	DF	(Spain) ESP	José Irízar
77	DF	(Philippines) PHI	Manuel Amechazurra
88	DF	(Spain) ESP	Pere Molins
88	DF	(Spain) ESP	Eduardo Reguera
98	MF	(Spain) ESP	Enrique Peris
55	MF	(Spain) ESP	Alfredo Massana
80	MF	(Spain) ESP	Manuel Castejón
62	MF	(Spain) ESP	Josep Costa
87	MF	(England) ENG	Jack Greenwell

No.	Pos.	Nation	Player
—	MF	(Argentina) ARG	Mariano Bori
—	MF	(Spain) ESP	Fèlix de Pomés
—	FW	(France) FRA	Jim Carlier
—	FW	(England) ENG	Percival Wallace
—	FW	(Spain) ESP	Francisco Baonza
—	FW	(England) ENG	Frank Allack
—	FW	(Spain) ESP	José Berdié
—	FW	(Spain) ESP	Casimiro Mallorquí
—	FW	(Spain) ESP	Gabriel Bau
—	FW	(Spain) ESP	Domingo Espelta
—	FW	(Spain) ESP	Antonio Morales
—	FW	(Philippines) PHI	Paulino Alcántara

== Results ==
Friendlies

7 September 1913	FC Català	2 - 8	FC Barcelona	Barcelona
			Castells; A.Massana; Enrique Peris; Pomés ?	Stadium: Salut

7 September 1913	FC Barcelona	3 - 0	Club T.B.H.	Barcelona
				Stadium: Industria

24 September 1913	FC Barcelona	6 - 1	Seleccio Catalana	Barcelona
	Carlier; A. Morales; Allack; Costa			Stadium: Industria; Referee: Castells

12 October 1913	FC Barcelona	3 - 0	Universitary SC	Barcelona
	Alcántara; P.Wallace			Stadium: Industria; Referee: Sanchez

1 November 1913	FC Barcelona	7 - 0	Madrid FC	Barcelona
	Carlier; Alcántara; P.Wallace; Greenwell			Stadium: Camp de la Indústria; Referee: Hodge

2 November 1913	FC Barcelona	1 - 0	Madrid FC	Barcelona
	Alcántara			Stadium: Camp de la Indústria; Referee: Hamilton

9 November 1913	CE Sabadell FC	1 - 4	FC Barcelona	Barcelona
			Carlier; Alcántara	Stadium: Sabadell; Referee: Joan Gamper

7 December 1913	FC Barcelona	5 - 0	Athletic Club	Barcelona
	Berdié; Alcántara; A.Massana			Stadium: Camp de la Indústria; Referee: Sanchez

8 December 1913	FC Barcelona	4 - 2	Club Atlético de Madrid	Barcelona
	A.Massana; Peris; Hodge; A.Morales			Stadium: Camp de la Indústria; Referee: John Hamilton

21 December 1913	FC Barcelona	6 - 3	Marins Anglesos	Barcelona
	Hodge; Alcántara; Allack; A.Morales			Stadium: Camp de la Indústria; Referee: John Hamilton

25 December 1913	FC Barcelona	1 - 2	Berner Sport Club Young Boys	Barcelona
	P.Wallace			Stadium: Camp de la Indústria; Referee: Hamilton

26 December 1913	FC Barcelona	2 - 2	Berner Sport Club Young Boys	Barcelona
	Alcántara; Carlier			Stadium: Camp de la Indústria; Referee: John Hamilton

31 December 1913	FC Barcelona	4 - 3	Cercle Athlétique de Paris Charenton	Barcelona
	Alcántara; Baonza; A. Morales			Stadium: Camp de la Indústria; Referee: Varela

1 January 1914	FC Barcelona	5 - 0	Cercle Athlétique de Paris Charenton	Barcelona
	P.Wallace; Allack; Peris; Carlier			Stadium: Camp de la Indústria; Referee: Varela

4 January 1914	Sociedad Gimnástica Española	0 - 1	FC Barcelona	Madrid
			Alcántara	Referee: Albéniz

6 January 1914	Madrid FC	2 - 2	FC Barcelona	Madrid
			P.Wallace; Allack	Referee: Ruete

8 January 1914	Athletic Club de Madrid	4 - 2	FC Barcelona	Madrid
			A.Morales; Allack	Referee: Menendez

10 January 1914	Madrid FC	0 - 2	FC Barcelona	Madrid
			Alcántara; Allack	Referee: Valls

22 February 1914	FC Barcelona	3 - 1	FC Català	Barcelona
	Bau; Costa			Stadium: Reial Polo Jockey Club; Referee: Rodriguez

25 February 1914	FC Barcelona	7 - 1	Stade Toulousain	Barcelona
	P.Wallace; Peris; Alcántara; Mallorqui; Bau			Stadium: Industria; Referee: Emilio Sampere

19 March 1914	FC Barcelona	3 - 6	Club Lillois	Barcelona
	P.Wallace; Alcántara; Greenwell			Stadium: Industria; Referee: F.Alcantara

22 March 1914	FC Barcelona	4 - 1	Club Lillois	Barcelona
	Bau; Greenwell			Stadium: Industria; Referee: Ruete primera part Ros segona part

6 April 1914	FC Barcelona	1 - 3	Middlesex Wanderers A.F.C.	Barcelona
	P.Wallace			Stadium: Industria; Referee: Sampere

13 April 1914	FC Barcelona	3 - 1	Middlesex Wanderers A.F.C.	Barcelona
	Alcántara; Bau; Mallorqui			Stadium: Industria; Referee: Hamilton

17 April 1914	FC Barcelona	2 - 1	Middlesex Wanderers A.F.C.	Barcelona
	Alcántara; Bau			Stadium: Industria; Referee: Torres Ullastres

20 April 1914	FC Barcelona	2 - 0	Middlesex Wanderers A.F.C.	Barcelona
	Mallorqui; Peris			Stadium: Industria; Referee: Sampere

31 May 1914	FC Barcelona	0 - 2	Notts County Football Club	Barcelona
				Stadium: Industria; Referee: Hamilton

1 June 1914	FC Barcelona	0 - 4	Notts County Football Club	Barcelona
				Stadium: Industria; Referee: Hamilton

7 June 1914	FC Barcelona	3 - 10	Notts County Football Club	Barcelona
	A.Morales; Peris			Stadium: Industria; Referee: Sampere

21 June 1914	FC Barcelona	0 - 2	Sportverein Stuttgarter Kickers	Barcelona
				Stadium: Industria; Referee: Baro

22 June 1914	FC Barcelona	2 - 1	Sportverein Stuttgarter Kickers	Barcelona
	Greenwell; Bau			Stadium: Industria; Referee: Apolonario

24 June 1914	FC Barcelona	2 - 0	Sportverein Stuttgarter Kickers	Barcelona
	Mallorqui; Bau			Stadium: Industria; Referee: Gibert

28 June 1914	FC Barcelona	5 - 2	FC Internacional	Barcelona
	Alcántara; Mallorqui; Bau			Stadium: Industria; Referee: Marti

22 July 1914	Arenas Club de Getxo	2 - 1	FC Barcelona	Getxo
			Bau	Stadium: Lamiako; Referee: Harreche

24 July 1914	Arenas Club de Getxo	1 - 0	FC Barcelona	Getxo
				Stadium: Lamiako; Referee: Lastigarraga

25 July 1914	Arenas Club de Getxo	3 - 0	FC Barcelona	Getxo
				Stadium: Lamiako; Referee: Ochandiano

28 July 1914	Arenas Club de Getxo	1 - 0	FC Barcelona	Getxo
				Stadium: Lamiako; Referee: Redondo

1 August 1914	FC Barcelona	3 - 1¹	F.B.Stadium	Barcelona
				Stadium: Industria

- Barcelona played with 10 players.

Copa Gamper

8 September 1913	FC Barcelona	11 - 1	FC Català	Barcelona
	Berdié; Alcántara; A.Massana; Allack			Stadium: Industria; Referee: Torres Ullastres

1 February 1914	FC Barcelona	2 - 1	Universitary SC	Barcelona
	Mallorqui; Bau			Stadium: Industria; Referee: Hamilton

Copa Catalunya

14 June 1914	FC Barcelona	3 - 1	FC Espanya	Barcelona
	Bau; A.Massana; Peris			Stadium: Espanyol; Referee: Torrens

5 July 1914	FC Barcelona	2 - 2	RCD Espanyol	Barcelona
	Bau; A.Massana; Peris			Stadium: Espanya; Referee: Marti

12 July 1914	FC Barcelona	5 - 1	Universitary SC	Barcelona
	Bau; A.Morales			Stadium: Sabadell; Referee: Parcerisa

Campionat de Catalunya

26 October 1913	FC Barcelona	4 - 1	FC Badalona	Barcelona
15:00	A. Morales; Fischer; Carlier		Kaiser	Stadium: Camp del carrer Entença / València; Referee: Reguera

16 November 1913	RCD Español	1 - 0	FC Barcelona	Barcelona
	López			Referee: Aguirreche

23 November 1913	FC España	1 - 0	FC Barcelona	Barcelona
15:15	Goal			Stadium: Velòdrom Parc d'Sports; Referee: Sagnier

30 November 1913	FC Internacional	2 - 1	FC Barcelona	Barcelona
14:40	Segarra; Brussendorf (p.p.)		Alcántara	Stadium: Velòdrom Parc d'Sports; Referee: Farré

14 December 1913	FC Barcelona	5 - 1	Universitary SC	Barcelona
	Berdié; Batlle (p.p.); Wallace; Massana		Armet	Referee: Sánchez

25 January 1914	FC Barcelona	not played	FC Numancia	Barcelona

22 February 1914	FC Barcelona	not played	Català SC	Barcelona
15:35				Stadium: Club de Polo

8 March 1914 tiebreaker for third place	RCD Español	no presentat	FC Barcelona	Barcelona
15:40				Stadium: Camp del carrer Entença / València

- El dia 22 de February havia previst jugar abdós partits.

Copa dels Pirineus

15 March 1914 Quarterfinals	FC Barcelona	5 - 0	CS Sabadell	Barcelona
	Wallace; Bau; Alcántara			Stadium: Camp del carrer Indústria; Referee: Greenwell

29 March 1914 Semifinals	FC Barcelona	2 - 5	FC España	Barcelona
16:00	Peris; Bau		Baró; Bellavista	Stadium: Camp del carrer Indústria; Referee: Nandy
