= Mariano Lacort =

Spanish footballer (1888–1936)

Personal information
- Full name: Mariano Jesús Lacort Tolosana
- Date of birth: 14 January 1888
- Place of birth: Haro, La Rioja, Spain
- Date of death: 1 August 1936 (aged 48)
- Place of death: Spain
- Position: Midfielder

Senior career*
Years	Team	Apps	(Gls)
1908–1909	Club Ciclista		
1909–1910	Vasconia SC		
1910–1912	Real Sociedad		
5th President of Real Sociedad
In office 1918–1919
Preceded by	Javier Peña
Succeeded by	Camilo Rodríguez
- * Club domestic league appearances and goals

Mariano Jesús Lacort Tolosana (14 January 1888 - 1 August 1936) was a Spanish footballer who played as a midfielder for Real Sociedad. He is one of the most important figures in the amateur beginnings of Real Sociedad, having been one of the founding members of the club in 1909 and then serving as its 5th president between 1918 and 1919.

== Playing career ==
Born in Haro, La Rioja, Lacort began his career in 1908 with the newly-founded San Sebastian Football Club. Lacort was a member of the side that also included Domingo Arrillaga, the Sena brothers (Alfonso, Miguel) and George McGuinness, which entered the 1909 Copa del Rey as Club Ciclista de San Sebastián and against all odds won the trophy after beating Español de Madrid 3–1 in the final.

A few months after this victory the players who won the tournament, together with José Berraondo, founded the Sociedad de Football (now known as Real Sociedad) on 7 September 1909, definitively disassociating themselves from Club Ciclista. Sociedad participated in the 1910 Copa del Rey (UECF) again under the umbrella of another local club, the Vasconia Sporting Club, and proved their worth again by reaching the final, which they lost 0–1 to Athletic Bilbao, courtesy of a goal from Remigio Iza.

Also in 1910, Real Sociedad participated in the inaugural edition of the Pyrenees Cup, and it was Lacort who scored the first goal of the competition, in the semi-finals against Stade toulousain at Ondarreta Stadium on 17 April; Lacort went on to score a further three goals to help his side to an 8–0 victory, and although he did not score in the final which they lost 1–2 against FC Barcelona, his four-goal haul was enough for him to be the top scorer of the tournament. In total, he played 10 official matches for Real Sociedad, scoring four goals.

== Presidency of Real Sociedad ==
In 1918, the 30-year-old Lacort was appointed as the 5th president of Real Sociedad, replacing Javier Peña, a position that he held for a year until 1919, when he was replaced by Camilo Rodríguez.

== Honours ==
Club Ciclista

- Copa del Rey: 1909

Real Sociedad

- Copa del Rey: Runner-up 1910 (Note: as Vasconia.)
