= Domingo Arrillaga =

Spanish footballer and manager

Personal information
- Full name: Domingo Arrillaga Larrarta
- Date of birth: 11 February 1890
- Place of birth: Eibar, Gipuzkoa, Spain
- Date of death: 22 February 1951 (aged 61)
- Place of death: Lima, Peru
- Position: Defender

Senior career*
Years	Team	Apps	(Gls)
1906–1908	San Sebastián RC		
1908–1909	Club Ciclista		
1909–1910	Vasconia SC		
1910	FC Barcelona		
1910–1911	RCD Espanyol		
1911–1913	Real Sociedad		
1913	Comercio		
1913–1914	Argentino de Quilmes		
1915–1917	Unión Miraflores		

International career
1913	Argentina	1	(0)

Managerial career
- 1933–1934: CD Malacitano
- 1941: Peru (5)
- 1945–1947: Alianza Lima
- * Club domestic league appearances and goals

Domingo Arrillaga Larrarta (11 February 1890 – 22 February 1951) was a Spanish footballer who played as a defender for Real Sociedad, RCD Espanyol, FC Barcelona, and Argentino de Quilmes. In 1913, he played one match as a forward for the Argentina national team.

As a manager, he coached CD Malacitano (1933–34), the Peruvian national team (1941), and Alianza Lima (1945–47).

== Playing career ==
=== Early career ===
Domingo Arrillaga was born on 11 February 1890 in Eibar, Gipuzkoa, and he began his football career in his hometown club San Sebastián Recreation Club in 1906, aged 16, but towards the end of 1907, an internal conflict caused the team to split, with several of its players, including Arrillaga, leaving the club to found San Sebastián FC in 1908. On 24 January 1909, he started in a friendly match against Stade Bordelais, helping his side to a 5–2 win; during the match, "the brave Arrillaga" collected a corner from Miguel Sena and then "unleashed a superb kick, which was stopped badly by the goalkeeper and collected by McGuinness, who scored the third goal".

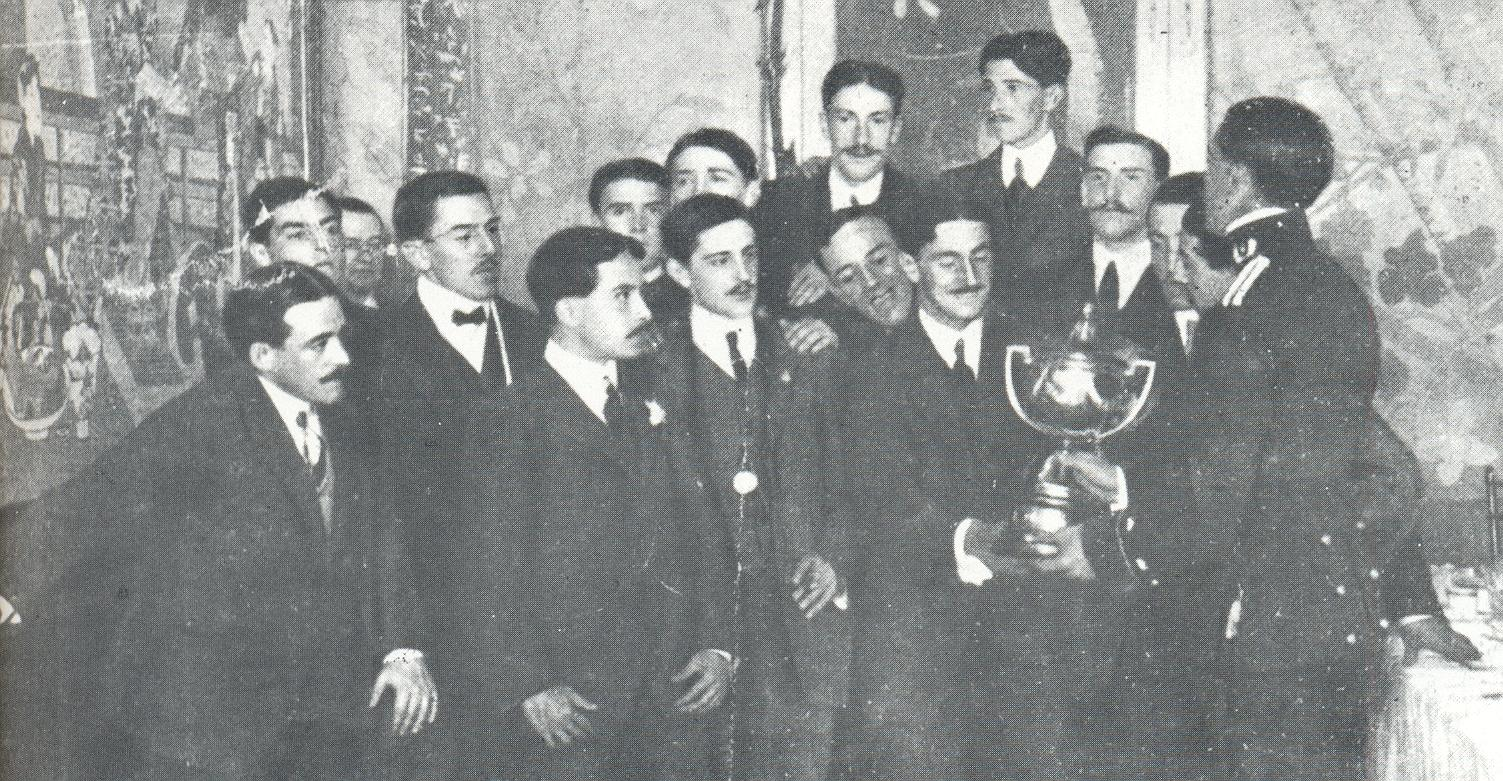
Players from Club Ciclista celebrating with the 1909 Copa del Rey trophy

To participate in the 1909 Copa del Rey, this team had to play under the umbrella of another local club, Club Ciclista de San Sebastián, and together with the Sena brothers (Alfonso and Miguel), Charles Simmons, and George McGuinness, he was a member of the Club Ciclista team that won the tournament, beating Español de Madrid 3–1 in the final.

=== Real Sociedad ===
A few months after this victory, the players who had won the tournament, with the help of José Berraondo, founded the Sociedad de Football (now known as Real Sociedad) on 7 September 1909, definitively disassociating themselves from the Cycling Club. Sociedad then participated in the 1910 Copa del Rey (UECF) under the umbrella of another local club, the Vasconia Sporting Club, but only after defeating Racing Club de Irún in a playoff to determine the local representative in the tournament, with Arrillaga playing in both matches, which ended in victories. On 20 March, Arrillaga started in the cup final, which ended in a 0–1 loss to Athletic Bilbao, the courtesy of a goal from Remigio Iza. In the following month, Arrillaga was a member of the Socieded team that participated in the inaugural edition of the Pyrenees Cup, helping his side to an 8–0 victory over Stade toulousain at Ondarreta Stadium in the semifinals on 17 April, but then starting and losing the final to Barcelona (1–2) on 1 May.

=== Barcelona ===
Later that month, and perhaps because of this loss, Arrillaga moved to Barcelona, where he first reinforced RCD Espanyol in a friendly against FC Espanya on 26 May, in a match to benefit Espanyol's Santiago Massana, to compensate him for the expenses caused by his "double leg break" injury. He then joined Barcelona, for whom he played 12 unofficial matches in the 1910–11 season, scoring only once, in a 1–1 home draw with Espanyol on 25 September 1910. He played his last match for Barça in a friendly against University SC on 27 November 1910, and not even a month later, on 18 December, he played a Catalan championship match against Barça, which ended in a 4–0 win to his former club.

=== Later career ===
In 1911, Arrillaga returned to Sociedad, with whom he played for a further two years, including three cup matches in 1913, which was the final against FC Barcelona, who needed three games to beat Sociedad. In total, he played 20 official matches for both Ciclista and Sociedad between 1909 and 1913, winning 11, drawing 5, and losing four.

=== South America ===
In 1913, Arrillaga moved to Argentina, where he briefly played for Comercio and Argentino de Quilmes. On 23 November, Arrillaga started in a 1–1 draw with CA Estudiantes, and this draw secured the championship for the latter team; Quilmes finished in third, four points away from the champion.

On 28 September 1913, Arrillaga earned his first (and only) cap for Argentina in a friendly against Uruguay, playing the full 90 minutes as a forward and helping his side to a 4–0 win. He then moved to Peru, where he played with Unión Miraflores for two years between 1915 and 1917.

== Manegerial career ==
In 1933, the 43-year-old Arrillaga was appointed as the very first coach of the newly founded CD Malacitano (currently known as Málaga CF), then in the Tercera División, a position that he held for a little over a year, when he was replaced by Juan Manzanedo. In the summer of 1933, CD Malacitano participated in a one-off tournament called Copa de Andalucía, reserved only for Andalusian First Category clubs, in which they only claimed victory once in a 3–1 win over Real Betis on 23 July.

In 1941, the 51-year-old Arrillaga replaced Jack Greenwell as the coach of the Peruvian national team, thus becoming the 7th coach of Peru and also the second Spaniard to do so, after Paco Bru, who led it in the inaugural 1930 FIFA World Cup. He managed Peru in the friendly tournament Copa Roque Sáenz Peña, where they achieved two draws against Argentina (1–1 in both games), and in the 1941 South American Championship in Chile, after which he was sacked, having led the team to only one win in four matches.

In 1945, Arrillaga took charge of Alianza Lima, where he stayed for two seasons, leading them to fourth and fifth place in the league. Although his time in charge of Alianza Lima was not transcendental, he contributed to the diversity of foreign styles in Peru.

== Death ==
Arrillaga continued to live in Peru until he died in Lima on 22 February 1951, at the age of 61.

== Honours ==
Club Ciclista

- Copa del Rey:
  - Champions (1): 1909

Real Sociedad

- Copa del Rey:
  - Runners-up (1): 1910 (Note: as Vasconia.) and 1913
- Pyrenees Cup:
  - Runners-up (1): 1910
