= Nicasio Goitisolo =

Spanish footballer

Personal information
- Full name: Nicasio Goitisolo Zubizarreta
- Date of birth: 10 October 1889
- Place of birth: Liverpool, England
- Date of death: Unknown
- Position: Midfielder

Youth career
- 1904: Old Xaverians

Senior career*
Years	Team	Apps	(Gls)
1905	Racing FC (Liverpool)		
1905	Arsenal		
1905	Crystal Palace		
1906–1907	Third Lanark		
1907–1908	Racing FC (Liverpool)		
1909–1910	Vasconia SC		
1910–1914	Real Sociedad		
1919–1925	Real Avilés		

Managerial career
- Real Avilés
- Racing de Sama
- * Club domestic league appearances and goals

Nicasio Goitisolo Zubizarreta (10 October 1889 – unknown), also known as Goiti, was a footballer who played as a midfielder for Real Sociedad. He was one of the first Spaniards (though born and raised in England) to participate in British football, and then had a prominent role during the first decade of the growing sport in Spain.

Goitisolo was introduced to football during his time as a schoolboy, developing a strong interest in the sport; however, he was still too young to play professionally at the time, leading to him being signed by various teams for short periods: in a timespan of just two years he had spells at Racing FC in Liverpool, then Arsenal and Crystal Palace in London and finally Third Lanark in Glasgow, before eventually achieving his dream of playing at the top level with Real Sociedad after returning to his parents' homeland. He later played for Stadium Club Avilesino.

== Biography ==
=== Early years ===
Goitisolo was born in Liverpool to Basque parents, his father being a native of Lekeitio and a sea captain in charge of a Merseyside shipping company. While studying at Saint Francis Xavier's College, Nicasio started playing for the school's Old Xaverians football team, developing a strong interest for the sport. In the collegiate club, he quickly stood out as an outstanding forward and was recruited for a more relevant team, Liverpool's Racing FC, in early 1905 at the age of just 15. Despite his youth, he excelled at Racing and was the team's top scorer in 1905, thus starting to dream of becoming a professional footballer. His goalscoring records drew the attention of one of the biggest clubs in the city, Liverpool FC, who set up a friendly with Racing in order to observe and access the possible incorporation of Goitisolo to the Reds. He played on the right wing on the day, but still managed to pass the test; however, he was only 16 years old and legally had to play in the second team for two years, something he felt would be a setback for him, especially after the great season he had with Racing where he faced rivals twice his age, so he did not accept Liverpool's proposal and thus missed out on the chance to become the club's first-ever Spanish player.

Despite the issue of his age, Goitisolo did not give up from his desire to be a footballer, and so, when he finished high school in 1905, he convinced his parents that he wanted to go to London to study teaching. He got a fake birth certificate that said he was 18, and there he went with the intention of knocking on the doors of as many clubs as necessary. After trying out various teams he was signed by Arsenal as a right winger. He played a few friendlies for the club, but less than he wanted, so he decided to move to Crystal Palace in search of greater prominence, but only had even worse luck, as about a month later it was discovered that he was only 16 and he was expelled from the club, putting an end to any chance of playing in England at the highest level at that stage, so he abandoned his studies and returned to Liverpool.

Instead of waiting two years for his 18th birthday, the eager Goitisolo went to the Scottish league, which had no age limit, in 1906 (aged 16) and was signed by one of the strongest teams in the country, Third Lanark from Glasgow, who had won the Scottish Cup in the previous season. After a year in Scotland, with no evidence of making any competitive appearances for Third Lanark, he returned home in 1907 and played for Liverpool's Racing FC for one further year. At the end of the 1907–08 season he returned to his parents' homeland, the Basque Country.

=== Spain ===
Goitisolo failed to sign for a club in his first year back in Spain, trying out with the likes of Athletic Club, with whom he got to play a friendly, but was not offered a contract. In 1909 he managed to get signed by the newly founded Sociedad de Futbol from San Sebastián, featuring alongside the likes of Charles Simmons, the Sena brothers (Alfonso and Miguel), and George McGuinness, with the latter also being from Liverpool and an 'Old Xaverian' although the nature of the relationship between the two young men has not been confirmed. In February 1910, King Alfonso XIII gave the club his royal patronage, and Goitisolo was one of the eleven footballers who played in the club's first match as Real Sociedad, held on 26 March 1910 at Ondarreta Stadium, ending in a 1–5 friendly loss to London Nodmans.

Goitisolo played in four official matches with Sociedad, two in the Copa del Rey and two in the Pyrenees Cup. Sociedad participated in the 1910 Copa del Rey under the umbrella of local club Vasconia Sporting Club (since their club was not yet a year old as the tournament statutes required), and Goitisolo captained this team to a 2–0 victory over Real Madrid (then known as Madrid FC); he was also the captain in the final which they lost 0–1 to Athletic, courtesy of a goal from Remigio Iza.

Also in 1910, Real Sociedad participated in the inaugural edition of the Pyrenees Cup, and Goitisolo netted two goals in the opening match of the competition, a semi-final clash against Stade toulousain at Ondarreta Stadium on 17 April, thus helping his side to an 8–0 victory, However, they lost the final 1–2 to FC Barcelona. He spent four years in the Basque team and was nicknamed "the wizard of dribbling". Goitisolo decided to return to England in 1914.

=== Asturias ===
The outbreak of the First World War interrupted all English football competitions between 1914 and 1919. At the end of the war, he went to the town of Soto del Barco on the coast of Asturias, where his sister Adelina lived, and worked for an English shipping company doing translations. The president of Stadium Club Avilesino heard about him and signed him in 1919, aged 30. He quickly became the star of the group, which gave him the nickname "Goiti". After applying methods he had learned in England, excellent results arrived immediately, as in 1920 the team won the 2nd division of the Regional Championship of Asturias followed by the national lower division title. They retained the regional league in 1921 before being admitted to the top division. Goitisolo worked in the team for five years until he retired in 1924.

=== Managerial career ===
As a coach, he managed Stadium Club Avilesino for seven years, as well as Racing de Sama for one season. The date and circumstances of his death are unknown.

== Honours ==
Third Larnak

- Scottish Cup: Runner-up 1907

Vasconia SC

- Copa del Rey: Runner-up 1910

Real Avilés

- Spanish second division: 1920
