= Domingo Espelta =

Spanish footballer and referee

Personal information
- Full name: Domingo Espelta Mussons
- Birth name: Domènec Espelta i Mussons
- Date of birth: 12 June 1893
- Place of birth: Barcelona, Catalonia, Spain
- Date of death: 17 December 1940 (aged 47)
- Place of death: Barcelona, Catalonia, Spain
- Position: Forward

Senior career*
Years	Team	Apps	(Gls)
1909–1918	FC Barcelona		
- * Club domestic league appearances and goals

Domingo Espelta Mussons (12 June 1893 – 17 December 1940) was a Spanish footballer who played as a forward for FC Barcelona between 1909 and 1918, winning two Catalan Championships (1910 and 1911) and the Pyrenees Cup in 1911. He later worked as a referee.

== Biography ==
He was born in Barcelona on 12 June 1893, as the son of Carolina Mussons and Domingo Espelta Guasch, a football referee who died in 1904.

Espelta joined the ranks of his hometown club FC Barcelona in 1909, aged 16. He was never able to become an undisputed starter, so he only played 10 official matches between 1909 and 1914, scoring twice, and several unofficial matches until the 1917–18 season, for a total of 5 goals in 45 unofficial matches. Together with the likes of Comamalas (Carles and Arsenio), the Wallaces (Charles and Percy), Peris, Romà Forns, and José Quirante, he helped Barça win two Catalan championships (1910 and 1911), and the Pyrenees Cup in 1911, starting in the latter's final as Barça defeated Stade Bordelais 4–2 in extra-time.

In addition to football, he also stood out as an athlete, especially in the 100-meter dash, running a time of 11.6 seconds on 14 July 1912, thus matching the previous Catalan record set by fellow Barça teammate Enrique Peris.

After retiring from playing, Espelta became a member of the Catalan Referees' Association in 1926, and after officiating several regional matches in the Catalan second category during the late 1920s and early 1930s, he made his debut in the first division in 1936, where he refereed a total of five matches until the 1940–41 season. Between 1935 and 1940, he also refereed 14 matches in the Segunda División and 2 in the Copa del Rey.

His refereeing career came to an end with his death on 17 December 1940, at the age of 47, due to an illness.

== Honours ==
FC Barcelona

- Catalan football championship
  - Champions (2): 1909–10 and 1910–11
- Pyrenees Cup
  - Champions (1): 1911
