= José Quirante =

Spanish footballer and manager (1883–1964)

Personal information
- Full name: José Quirante Pineda
- Date of birth: May 10, 1883
- Place of birth: Alicante, Valencian Community, Spain
- Date of death: May 30, 1964 (aged 81)
- Place of death: Barcelona, Spain
- Height: 1.73 m (5 ft 8 in)
- Position: Midfielder

Youth career
- FC Barcelona

Senior career*
Years	Team	Apps	(Gls)
1901–1911	FC Barcelona	40	(18)
1906–1908	Real Madrid	46	(17)
1910	RCD Espanyol	12	(5)
1911–1912	Universitary SC		
1912–1913	FC Casual		

International career
1904–1912	Catalonia	4	(0)

Managerial career
- 1928–1929: Unión Sporting Club de Madrid
- 1929–1930: Real Madrid CF
- 1930–1933: Sevilla FC
- 1933–1935: Real Murcia
- 1939: Athletic Madrid
- 1939–1940: Hércules CF
- 1940–1941: Málaga CF
- 1941–1942: Cádiz CF
- 1947–1948: Real Betis
- * Club domestic league appearances and goals

José Quirante Pineda (10 May 1883 in Alicante, Spain – 30 May 1964 in Barcelona, Spain) was a footballer who played as a midfielder, being one of the first players to play for both FC Barcelona and Real Madrid. He is also remembered for being one of the first professional players of the still growing sport. Quirante was one of the most important players in the amateur beginnings of FC Barcelona, playing with them for a whole decade between 1901 and 1911.

He was a noted athlete and cyclist and, after his sports retirement, he had a prolific career and long career as a coach for numerous clubs throughout Spanish geography. He was the coach of Real Madrid during the first Spanish league season in 1929. He was also one of the founders of Casual SC.

== Club career ==
Quirante was born in Valencian Community, but moved to Barcelona as a child, where he began to develop an interest in football. He began his career as a midfielder at his hometown club FC Barcelona during the 1901–02 season, being a member of the Barcelona team that won its very first trophy, the Copa Macaya in 1901–02, netting one goal on the final matchday on 23 March 1902 in a 15–0 victory over Català SC. The Copa Macaya is now recognized as the first Catalan championship. He then helped the club win the Copa Barcelona in 1902–03, and played a pivotal role in helping Barça win the Catalan championship in 1904–05.

During his trips to the capital of Spain due to work obligations, he did not give up on his passion for football and kept playing, doing so for two years (1906–08) with Real Madrid without ever abandoning the Barça ranks.

Quirante was part of the club's first great team in the early 1910s, which had the likes of Massana, Amechazurra, Peris, Paco Bru and the Wallace brothers (Charles and Percival). He helped this side win the Catalan championship three times in a row between 1909 and 1911. Also in this period, in 1910, he was a member of the Barcelona side that won the inaugural edition of the Pyrenees Cup, starting in the final in which he helped his side beat Real Sociedad 2–1, thus contributing in the club's first piece of international silverware.

He remained loyal to the club until 1911, the date on which he was expelled from the club due to discrepancies with the board: Joan Gamper had always strongly opposed professionalism in Barça, however, Quirante together with Manuel Amechazurra, José Irízar and Alfredo Massana, started to get paid in disguise (numerous reasons), thus becoming the club's first undercover professional as well as Spain's first professional players along with Joaquín Yarza of Sporting de Vigo. After a brief appearance at Universitary SC, Quirante decided to found his own club in 1912, Casual SC, together with other dissidents from FC Barcelona, some of which decided to leave Barça for feeling that Quirante's expulsion was unfair and the other left the club due to financial differences, among whom Paco Bru, Carles Comamala or Charles Wallace. In 1913 Casual folded due to financial reasons and Quirante, together with Carles Comamala, decided to retire.

== International career ==
Like many other FC Barcelona players of that time, he played several matches for the Catalonia national team between 1904 and 1912, however, due to the little statistical rigor that the newspapers had at that time, the exact amount of caps he earned is unknown. On 8 December 1912, Catalonia faced a selection of foreigners at the Camp de la Indústria in a benefit match for the Sindicat de Periodistes, and Quirante started in a 5–2 win over the foreigners. He was also one of the eleven footballers who played in the team's first-ever match on 30 May 1904.

== Managerial career ==
His extensive knowledge of the game led him to dictate the tactics to be followed and Barcelona's game plans, thus basically performing the functions of Barça's coach between 1903 and 1907. However, his official managerial career only began 20 years later, in 1927, when the now retired Quirante was appointed as the new coach of RCD Espanyol. With them, he played that season's Catalan championship almost in its entirety, but he was then replaced at the beginning of 1928 by Jack Greenwell. After another unsuccessful brief spell, this time with Unión Sporting Club, Quirante become the coach of Real Madrid CF, which is the highlight of his managerial career, finishing as runners-up of the first-ever Spanish league season in 1929, winning two Centro Regional Championship and even a Copa del Rey runner-up medal in 1929. Despite the good performance shown, a draw and four defeats in the second edition of the league earned him his dismissal.

After his golden years at Madrid (1929–1930), he ended up in Sevilla FC, joining them during the 1930–31 season. In his first season in charge of the club the team finished in 3rd, the club's best position, however, they got 8th in 1931–32 and 9th in 1932–33.

He also coached Real Murcia before the outbreak of the Spanish Civil War. After the war, he was hired by Athletic Madrid in 1939, leading the team in a few matches of the 1939 Mancomunado, which was won by Club Aviación Nacional, whose manager was Ricardo Zamora. Shortly after the tournament, the Atletico leaders and the military society agreed on the merger of both entities, which became known as the Athletic-Aviation Club, and it was Zamora who managed the club for the rest of the season, ousting Quirante to Hércules Alicante. Throughout the 1940s he also coached the likes of Málaga CF, Cádiz CF and Real Betis.

== Honours ==
=== As a player ===
FC Barcelona

- Copa Macaya:
  - Champions: 1901–02
- Copa Barcelona
  - Champions: 1902–03
- Catalan championship
  - Champions (4): 1904–05, 1908–09, 1909–10 and 1910–11

Pyrenees Cup

  - Champions: 1910

=== As a coach ===
Real Madrid FC

- Centro Regional Championship:
  - Champions (2): 1928–29 and 1929–30

Sevilla FC

- South Regional Championship:
  - Champions (2): 1930–31 and 1931–32
