= Charles F. Simmons (footballer) =

Spanish footballer (1880–1911)

Charles Simmons
Personal information
- Full name: Charles Frederick Simmons
- Date of birth: c. August 1880
- Place of birth: Lichfield, England
- Date of death: 6 July 1911 (aged 30)
- Place of death: London, England
- Position: Forward

Senior career*
Years	Team	Apps	(Gls)
1906	Athletic Club		
1906–1907	Club Vizcaya		
1907–1908	Athletic Club		
1908–1909	Club Ciclista		
1909–1910	Vasconia SC		
1910–1911	Real Sociedad		
- * Club domestic league appearances and goals

Charles Frederick Simmons (1880 – 6 July 1911) was an English footballer who played as a forward for Spanish clubs including Athletic Bilbao. The highlight of his career was scoring in the 1909 Copa del Rey Final to help Club Ciclista win the title for the first time in its history. He is best known for being the only English captain that Athletic Bilbao ever had in its 120-year-history.

== Early life ==
Charles Frederick Simmons was born in Lichfield, Staffordshire in 1880; the exact date of birth is uncertain, but he was registered in the civil registry between July and September of that year and was listed as 8 months old in the 1881 United Kingdom census taken in the following April. He was the fifth son of the marriage formed by James William Simmons (1840–?) and Lucy Fitzsimmons (1844–1916).

== Playing career ==
=== Athletic Club ===
He was still living in central England in 1901 but had joined the ranks of Athletic Club in Bilbao at the end of 1906, and began training with the first team at the beginning of 1907. He quickly stood out for his ability to find and create chances for his teammates. In the game he never felt the need to stand out for his individual ability, preferring to pass or assist, and this was his greatest merit and praise, a virtue highly regarded in a time where shooting at goal from 30 yards out reigned. He was the one who linked the team the most. His style of play was the direction of the game and the preparation of plays, for which reason many of his teammates thrived.

Back then, it was impossible to live exclusively out of football, so Simmons had a job at the Vickers firm, manufacturers of fast-fire cannons, machine guns, and projectiles, and provided his services as an accountant at the Plasencia de las Armas factory.

=== Club Bizcaya ===
In 1907, the best players from Athletic and Unión Vizcaino came together to form Club Bizcaya – specially created to take part in the 1907 Copa del Rey – and Simmons was elected into the team, where he featured alongside the likes of Juan Arzuaga, the Sena brothers (Alfonso and Miguel), and Ramón de Cárdenas. On 24 March 1907, he made his competitive debut (Athletic Bilbao counts the matches played by Bizcaya as its own) in the group stage of the 1907 Copa del Rey, netting twice in a 3–2 win over Madrid CF (now Real Madrid). Simmons was the fundamental head behind the club's campaign to the final, which they lost 1–0 to Madrid FC, courtesy of a late goal from Manuel Prast. Upon returning from the 1907 championship, Club Bizcaya played a charity match against Club Portugalete in the Hippodrome of Lamiako in favor of the unhappy families of the Portugalete castaways, and Simmons was the star of the match despite playing with bandages from an injury sustained in the cup final.

After the Bizcaya team was discontinued, Alfonso returned to Athletic Club, with whom he played until 1908. He played his last match in Bilbao against Stade Bordalais de Bordeaux (a club with more than a thousand members at that time), and captained his side to a 2–0 win over the French side, thus becoming the first (and only) English captain in the history of the club. At the beginning of the following season, 1908–09, Simmons asked Athletic to be released from the port, wishing to join former Bizcaya teammate Miguel Sena in San Sebastián at Club Ciclista.

=== Club Ciclista ===
Together with Domingo Arrillaga, the Sena brothers, and fellow Englishmen George McGuinness, he was part of the Club Ciclista team that won the 1909 Copa del Rey, after they unexpectedly but convincingly defeated his former club Athletic in the quarter-finals, with Simmons netting once in a 4–2 win. Simmons also scored in the final to help his side to a 3–1 win over Español de Madrid.

=== Real Sociedad ===
A few months after this victory, the players who won the tournament, together with José Berraondo, founded the Sociedad de Futbol (now known as Real Sociedad) on 7 September 1909 and participated in the 1910 Copa del Rey under the umbrella of local club Vasconia Sporting Club (since the club was not a year old as the tournament statutes required); and he helped the club reach another final, which ended in a 1–0 loss to his former club, Athletic Bilbao, courtesy of a goal from Remigio Iza. In the same year, King Alfonso XIII gave the club his patronage whereby it subsequently became known as Real Sociedad de Fútbol.

Also in 1910, Real Sociedad participated in the inaugural edition of the Pyrenees Cup, and Simmons netted once in the opening match of the competition, a semi-final clash against Stade toulousain at Ondarreta Stadium on 17 April, thus helping his side to an 8–0 win. However, they lost the final 1–2 to FC Barcelona. In total, he played 7 official matches for Real Sociedad, scoring three goals, two in the 1909 cup and once in the 1910 Pyrenees Cup.

== Death ==
Shortly after the 1910 cup final, Simmons had to return to England in an effort to recover from illness. At the time of the 1911 United Kingdom census he was living with his brother James' family in Harlesden, London, but died at London's Wandsworth Asylum in June of that year at the age of just 30.

== Honours ==
Club Bizcaya

- Copa del Rey: runner-up 1907

Club Ciclista

- Copa del Rey: 1909

Real Sociedad

- Pyrenees Cup: runner-up 1910
- Copa del Rey: runner-up 1910 (Note: as Vasconia.)
