= George McGuinness =

Spanish footballer

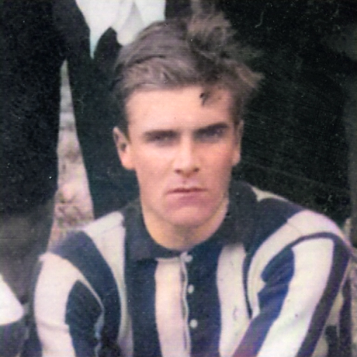
- McGuinness in 1909
- Born: 6 October 1887; Liverpool, England
- Died: 1 July 1916 (aged 28); Montauban-de-Picardie, France
- Cause of death: Killed in action
- Other name: "Mac Guinness"
- Education: St Francis Xavier's College, Liverpool
- Occupation: Teacher
- Years active: 1908–1914
- Parents: Edward (father); Catherine (mother)
- Relatives: Edward (brother); James (brother)
Association football career
- Height: 5 ft 5 1/2 in (1.66 m)
- Position: Forward
Senior career*
Years	Team	Apps	(Gls)
1908–1909	Club Ciclista		
1909–1910	Vasconia SC	9	(7)
1911–1914	Harrowby FC		
- * Club domestic league appearances and goals
- Military career
- Allegiance: United Kingdom
- Branch: Army
- Service years: 1914–1916
- Rank: Private
- Service number: 16665
- Conflicts: Battle of Albert (1916)
- Website: Medal card of McGuinness

George McGuinness (6 October 1887 – 1 July 1916) was an English footballer who played as a forward for the Spanish club Real Sociedad, teacher and soldier. He is mostly known for his goals at the 1909 Copa del Rey to help Club Ciclista win the title for the first time, netting a then national record of six in a single tournament including a hat-trick against Athletic Club and the opening goal of the final.

== Early life ==
George McGuinness's father, Edward, was from Liverpool, but he was in Plymouth in 1884, where he married a local, Catherine (née Pitt). It was there that eldest son, Edward Jr. was born in 1886. By 1887 the family had moved to Liverpool, where Edward Sr., would follow a career in as a schoolmaster – eventually becoming a Head teacher – and George and younger brother James were born. In 1901 the family was living in Toxteth Park. McGuinness attended St Francis Xavier's College, Liverpool. Like his father and elder brother, he followed a career in education and by 1911 was an assistant-teacher, while the family was living in Seacombe, on the Wirral Peninsula opposite Liverpool.

== Playing career ==
=== In Spain ===
In 1908, at the age of 21, McGuinness arrived in San Sebastián, where he taught English to Pedro Bea, the goalkeeper of the newly founded Club Ciclista. Knowing that the young Englishman was a passionate footballer, Bea encouraged him to join the team.

The newly founded Club Ciclista was far from the favorite to win the 1909 Copa del Rey, but they exceeded all expectations by winning the tournament, largely thanks to McGuinness, who scored a hat-trick in a 4–2 upset of the powerful Athletic Club in the quarter-finals, followed by both of his side's goals in a 2–0 win over Galicia FC. However, he was injured during that game, and even though Club Ciclista managed to hold on to the win with just nine men, the concern was whether their star would be able to play the final two days later at Campo de O'Donnell. McGuinness's participation in the final was doubtful, but at the last moment he decided to play, and with him on the field, Club Ciclista beat Español de Madrid 3–1 featuring yet another goal from McGuinness, who opened the scoring from the penalty spot (compatriot Charles Simmons and Miguel Sena netted the other two goals). It was the first Copa title won by a team other than Athletic and Madrid, while individually he also broke the record for the most goals in a single edition with six.

A few months after this victory, the players who won the tournament founded the Sociedad de Futbol (now known as Real Sociedad) on 7 September 1909 and participated in the 1910 Copa del Rey under the umbrella of local club Vasconia Sporting Club (since the club was not a year old as the tournament statutes required); once again McGuinness proved to be the matchwinner with both goals in a 2–0 over Madrid FC, although they lost the final to Athletic 0–1, courtesy of a goal from Remigio Iza. In the same year, King Alfonso XIII gave the club his patronage whereby it subsequently became known as Real Sociedad de Fútbol, and McGuinness went down in history again for netting the club's first goal as Real Sociedad, on 26 March 1910, in a 1–5 friendly loss to London Nodmans. At this point one of the other players in the side was Nicasio Goitisolo, an Anglo-Basque who was also from Liverpool and an 'Old Xaverian', although the nature of the relationship between the two young men has not been confirmed.

Also in 1910, Sociedad participated in the inaugural edition of the Pyrenees Cup, and McGuinness netted once in the opening match of the competition, a semi-final clash against Stade toulousain at Ondarreta Stadium on 17 April, thus helping his side to an 8–0 victory, Two weeks later, on 1 May, he featured in the final against FC Barcelona, and although he assisted Manuel Prast for the opening goal, they ultimately lost 1–2. In total, he played nine competitive matches for Real Sociedad, scoring seven goals, six in the Copa del Rey and one in the Pyrenees Cup.

On 2 December 1910, he played his last game for the Basque club, going off with a five-goal haul against Biarritz Stade.

=== Return to the Wirral ===
At 23, he left San Sebastián, returning to England to take up teaching at St Laurence's Roman Catholic School in Birkenhead. During his years as a schoolmaster, he resided with his parents at 28 Falkland Road, Egremont,Wallasey. In Wallasey, George McGuinness played football alongside his brother, James, for Harrowby FC and was ″well-known″ as its outside right. While McGuinness was part of the club, Harrowby played at the Tower Athletic Ground competing in the West Cheshire Association Football League.

== World War I ==
At the outbreak of the First World War, McGuinness was one of the earliest to volunteer for the army, enlisting with James in the Liverpool Pals Private G. McGuinness was assigned to the 18th Battalion of the King's Regiment (Liverpool). Fourteen months later, on 7 November 1915, McGuinness crossed the English Channel to France aboard the SS Invicta (1905), with his battalion, as part of the 89th Brigade, 30th Division. At the end of December, the 18th Battalion transferred to 21st Brigade, but still in the same division.

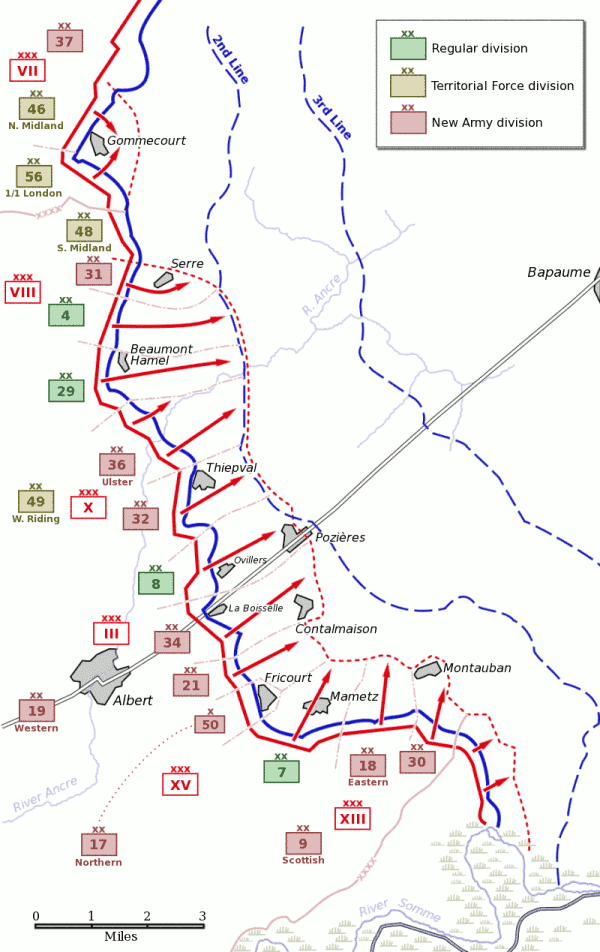
British battle line on the Somme, 1 July 1916. The 30th Division is in the bottom right opposite Montauban. The 18th Battalion was on the division's left adjacent to the 18th Division

On the 1 July 1916, the 30th Division was on the front line just north-west of Maricourt, when the British Army suffered its highest number of single-day casualties during the first day of the Battle of the Somme. However, the 30th's position was away to the south from where most of that day's 57,470 British casualties were suffered and the division took all its allotted objectives. Specifically, after initially advancing at Zero Hour (7:30 am) and then waiting for a scheduled lifting barrage to lift, the 18th Battalion carried the Glatz Redoubt, as part of the capture of Montauban. Unfortunately McGuinness was killed in action, among that day's 19,240 British fatalities. Two weeks later, McGuinness's parents received a letter from one of George's battalion pals, John Caulfield, who wrote that a bullet killed McGuinness during combat. He is commemorated on the Thiepval Memorial to the Missing of the Somme

== Honours ==
Club Ciclista

- Copa del Rey: 1909

Real Sociedad

- Copa del Rey: Runner-up 1910 (Note: as Vasconia.)

Harrowby

- West Cheshire League Division One Champions: 1912-13
