= Graells =

Graells (or Graëlls) is a Catalan surname. Notable people with the surname include:

- Eladio Silvestre Graells (born 1940), Spanish footballer
- Josep Graells (born 1964), Andorran middle-distance runner and Olympics competitor
- Mariano de la Paz Graells y de la Agüera (1809–1898), Spanish entomologist
- Ricard Graells (?–?), president of FC Barcelona from June 1919 to June 1920
