= 1910 UECF Copa del Rey final =

Copa del Rey 1910 final (UECF)
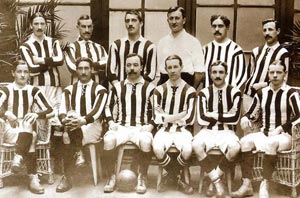
- The winning Athletic Bilbao squad of 1910
- Event: 1910 Copa del Rey
Athletic Bilbao	Vasconia SC
1	0
- Date: 20 March 1910
- Venue: Ondarreta Stadium, San Sebastián
- Referee: (France) D. Labat

The 1910 Copa del Rey final (UECF) was the 8th final of the Spanish cup competition, the Copa del Rey (although technically there was no final, with the tournament being played as a mini-group of three teams). It was one of two rival Cup competitions played in that year due to disagreements between the tournament's reigning champion, Club Ciclista de San Sebastián, and some of the clubs invited.

This was the "unofficial" competition, organised by the UECF (Unión Española de Clubes de Fútbol), in San Sebastián. Both its winner and that of the rival, the newly created FEF (Federación Española de Fútbol), later Royal Spanish Football Federation (Spanish: Real Federación Española de Fútbol, RFEF) in Madrid played two months later, are currently recognised as official by the RFEF.

The final was contested by Athletic Bilbao (then known as Athletic Club) and Vasconia SC, and was held at Ondarreta Stadium, San Sebastián on 20 March 1910. Athletic won the trophy for the third time in their history after defeating Vasconia 1–0, with the only goal of the game being scored by Remigio Iza.

The tournament is believed to have been the first time Athletic Bilbao wore what became their regular red-and-white striped jersey, having recently imported the first set of kit from England (along with a set for their sister club, later known as Atletico Madrid).

== Details ==
20 March 1910

Athletic Bilbao	1–0	Vasconia SC
Iza 56'	Report1; Report2

Ondarreta Stadium,, San Sebastián, Spain
Referee: (France) D. Labat

Athletic Bilbao	Vasconia

(Spain) Luis Astorquia
(Spain) Juan Arzuaga
(Spain) José María Amann
(Spain) José María Belauste (c)
(England) Cameron
(England) Graham
(Spain) Luis Hurtado
(Spain) Remigio Iza
(England) Burns
(England) Andrew Veitch
(Spain) Luis Iceta

(Cuba) Pedro Bea
(Spain) Chefo
(Spain) Joaquín Pérez
(Spain) Domingo Arrillaga
(Argentina) Bonifacio Echeverria
(Spain) Nicasio Goitisolo
(Spain) Manuel Prast
(England) Charles Simmons
(England) George McGuinness
(Spain) Mariano Lacort
(Spain) Luis Saura
Manager:
(Spain) José Berraondo

Sources: (Note: Some sources wrongly state that instead of Pérez, Arrillaga and Prast, the ones who started for Sociedad were Alfonso Sena, José Berraondo and Eusebio Leturia.)

== See also ==
- 1910 FEF Copa del Rey Final
- 1913 UECF Copa del Rey Final
- Basque derby
