= SS Invicta =

A number of steamships have carried the name Invicta.

- SS Invicta (1882), built for the London, Chatham & Dover Railway, scrapped in 1899
- SS Invicta (1905), built for the South Eastern & Chatham Railway, sold in 1923
- SS Invicta (1939), Built for the Southern Railway, scrapped in 1972
