= Antonio Morales =

Spanish footballer

Personal information
- Full name: Antonio Morales Veloso
- Date of birth: 6 December 1889
- Place of birth: Madrid, Spain
- Date of death: 7 November 1967 (aged 77)
- Place of death: Sabadell, Catalonia
- Position: Forward

Youth career
- 1904–1907: Moncloa Football Club

Senior career*
| Years | Team | Apps | (Gls) |
| 1907–1908 | Sociedad Gimnástica | | |
| 1908–1910 | Club Español de Madrid | | |
| 1910–1912 | Sociedad Gimnástica | | |
| 1912 | FC Barcelona | | |
| 1912–1913 | RCD Espanyol | | |
| 1913–1915 | FC Barcelona | 74 | (32) |
| 1915 | Racing de Madrid | | |
| 1915–1916 | CE Sabadell | | |

International career
| 1912-1916 | Catalonia | 3 | (0) |
- * Club domestic league appearances and goals

Antonio Morales Veloso (6 December 1889 – 7 November 1967), sometimes referred to by some sources as Arsenio Morales was a Spanish footballer who played as a forward for Club Español de Madrid, RS Gimnástica and FC Barcelona. His brother Rafael Morales (Morales II), was also a FC Barcelona footballer.

== Club career ==
Born in Madrid, he began his career in the youth ranks of his hometown club Moncloa Football Club, with whom he played for three seasons. At Moncloa, he stood out first as a midfielder, and then as a forward, which earned him a move to Sociedad Gimnástica. After just one season there, he joined Club Español de Madrid, forming a great attacking partnership with José Giralt and Antonio Neyra. He played an important role in the club's first-ever piece of silverware, the 1908–09 Centro Championship, and then he helped the club reach back-to-back Copa del Rey finals in 1909 and 1910, which they lost 1–3 to Club Ciclista and 2–3 to FC Barcelona. In 1910, he returned to Sociedad Gimnástica, and in first season back in the club he won the Centro Championship again.

His goalscoring exploits for Español de Madrid and Gimnástica eventually drew the attention of Barcelona, who signed him in February 1912 and Morales quickly became one of the club's benchmarks, helping the club win the Cup double (Pyrenees Cup and Copa del Rey) shortly after his arrival. Morales featured in the 1912 Copa del Rey Final, in which he helped the Catalan side beat his former club Sociedad Gimnástica. He also played in the final of the 1912 Pyrenees Cup on 5 May, netting three of Barça's 5 goals against Stade Bordelais. Morales got a hat-trick for a title, and even so, despite his achievements, Barcelona allowed him to be signed by city rivals RCD Espanyol for the 1912–13 season.

He did not lose his goal-scoring instinct at Espanyol and he showed exactly that to Barça when he netted twice against his former club in the semi-finals of the 1913 Pyrenees Cup (3–1), however, his revenge was cut short when the result was annulled after the Blaugrana protested about the improper use of British players by Espanyol, resulting in their disqualification. He returned to Barcelona at the end of the season, where he played until 1915. He played a total of 74 games with Barça, scoring 32 goals. He finished his career at Racing de Madrid and CE Sabadell between 1915 and 1916.

== International career ==
Like many other FC Barcelona of his time, he played several matches for the Catalan national team, being one of the eleven footballers who played in the team's first-ever game recognized by FIFA on 20 February 1912, which ended in a 0-7 loss to France.

== Honours ==
=== Club ===
Club Español de Madrid

- Centro Championship:
  - Champions (1): 1908–09
- Copa del Rey:
  - Runner-up (2): 1909 and 1910

-

Sociedad Gimnástica

- Centro Championship:
  - Champions (1): 1910–11

-

Barcelona

- Pyrenees Cup:
  - Champions (1): 1912
- Copa del Rey:
  - Champions (1): 1912

== See also ==
- List of footballers who achieved hat-trick records
