= 1909 Copa del Rey =

7th Copa del Rey

Tournament details
- Country: Spain
- Teams: 5

Final positions
- Champions: Club Ciclista (1st title)
- Runners-up: Español de Madrid

Tournament statistics
- Matches played: 4
- Goals scored: 17 (4.25 per match)
- Top goal scorer(s): (England) George McGuinness (6 goals)

The 1909 Copa del Rey was the 7th staging of the Copa del Rey, the Spanish football cup competition.

The competition started on 4 April 1909, and concluded on 8 April 1909, with the final, held at the O'Donnell, in Madrid, in which Club Ciclista de San Sebastián lifted the trophy for the first time ever with a 3–1 victory over Español Madrid. The Basque goalscorers were George McGuinness, Charles Simmons and Miguel Sena.

Club Ciclista de San Sebastián are the predecessors of Real Sociedad. After winning the cup trophy, on 7 September 1909 the players of Club Ciclista founded a new in club in San Sebastián, called Vasconia, later changing the name to Real Sociedad. The trophy of the 1909 Copa del Rey is in Real Sociedad's museum.

== First round ==
4 April 1909

Club Ciclista	4–2	Athletic Bilbao
George McGuinness 20', 30', 80' (pen.); Charles Simmons 50' (pen.)	Report	Luis Saura 10' (pen.); Mortimer 60'

O'Donnell, Madrid
Referee: (Spain) Manuel Yarza (Español de Madrid)

== Semifinals ==
5 April 1909

Español de Madrid	3–2	FC Barcelona
Antonio Neyra 60', 70', 87'	Report	Romà Forns 30'; Charles Wallace 50'

O'Donnell, Madrid
Referee: (Spain) Vicente Lescaille
6 April 1909

Club Ciclista	2–0	Galicia FC
George McGuinness 30', 85'	Report

O'Donnell, Madrid
Referee: Charles Simmons

== Final ==
8 April 1909

Club Ciclista	3–1	Español de Madrid
George McGuinness 30' (pen.); Charles Simmons 47'; Miguel Sena (2T)		José Giralt (2T)

O'Donnell, Madrid
Referee: (Spain) Alfonso Almasqué

Copa del Rey 1909 Winners
Club Ciclista
1st Title
