= Luis Reñé =

Spanish footballer

Luís Reñé
Personal information
- Full name: Luís Reñé Padrisa
- Birth name: Lluís Reñé i Padrisa
- Date of birth: 18 September 1889
- Place of birth: Barcelona, Catalonia, Spain
- Date of death: 2 July 1963 (aged 73)
- Place of death: Barcelona, Catalonia, Spain
- Position: Goalkeeper

Senior career*
Years	Team	Apps	(Gls)
1907–1908	Ibèric FC		
1908–1909	FC Català		
1909–1910	RCD Espanyol		
1910–1911	FC Espanya		
1911–1914	FC Barcelona	72	
1914	FC Espanya		
1915	Universitary SC		

International career
1910–1912	Catalonia	4	(0)
- * Club domestic league appearances and goals

Luís Reñé Padrisa (18 September 1889 – 2 July 1963), born Lluís and sometimes spell as Renyé, was a Spanish footballer who played as a goalkeeper for FC Barcelona. He was the first goalkeeper in Barcelona's history to establish himself as an indisputable starter. In addition to being a footballer, he excelled in athletics, a sport in which he was champion of Catalonia in the discus throw in 1912).

The highlight of his career was winning the treble with Barcelona in the 1912–13 season (Catalan championship, Copa del Rey and Pyrenees Cup), in which he played a decisive role.

== Club career ==
Born in Catalonia, Reñé joined the first team of Ibèric FC during the 1907–08 season as a defender. It was only at Català FC when he began to play as a goalkeeper, and he went on to play in that position for fellow Catalan clubs Espanyol and FC Espanya. In these clubs, he stood out for his ability to punch away high balls and for his great reflexes. He also had a great physique, with a height much higher than most players of the time. Eventually, his performance drew the attention of FC Barcelona, who signed him in 1911.

Shortly after being signed, Reñé was involved in a controversy regarding Barça's line-up in the 1911 Copa del Rey: Barcelona defeated Sociedad Gimnástica 4–0, but Gimnástica challenged the match due to the improper alignment of Reñé, who had played with FC Espanya less than a month ago (the regulations of the time did not allow players to play in two different teams in such a short space of time). Faced with this complaint, the Football Federation ordered the match to be replayed, but Barcelona refused to do it claiming the line-up of English players in Athletic Bilbao, so Barcelona was disqualified.

In the following season, Reñé and Barcelona got their revenge when they beat Sociedad Gimnástica in the 1912 Copa del Rey Final, in which Reñé kept a clean-sheet in a 2–0 victory, thus contributing decisively in Barça's triumph. Their victory over Gimnástica also sealed a treble, as he had helped Barça win the 1911–12 Catalan championship and the 1912 Pyrenees Cup. Reñé was once again the starting goalkeeper of a Barcelona Copa del Rey winning squad when he featured in all three games of the Copa del Rey Final (UECF) against Real Sociedad. In his last season at Barça (1913–14), he lost his place in the side to new-signing Luis Bru, thus featuring mainly as a substitute. He then moved to University SC, finishing his career in 1915.

== International career ==
Like many other FC Barcelona of his time, he played several matches for the Catalan national team, being one of the eleven footballers who played in the team's first-ever game recognized by FIFA on 20 February 1912, which ended in a 0–7 loss to France.

== Honours ==
Barcelona

- Catalan championship:
  - Champions (1): 1912–13
- Pyrenees Cup:
  - Champions (2): 1912 and 1913
- Copa del Rey:
  - Champions (2): 1912 and 1913
