= Manuel Amechazurra =

Philippine-born Spanish footballer

Personal information
- Full name: Manuel Amechazurra Guazo
- Date of birth: 8 March 1888
- Place of birth: La Carlota, Negros Occidental, Captaincy General of the Philippines
- Date of death: 13 February 1965
- Place of death: Barcelona, Spain
- Position: Defender

Senior career*
Years	Team	Apps	(Gls)
1902–1906	FC Irish		
1906–1908	F.C. Barcelona	35	(15)
1908	St. Boniface's College		
1908	Star United		
1908	Unión Católica		
1909	Stoke Chuchife		
1909	Real Unión		
1909–1915	FC Barcelona	165	(7)

International career
1910–1915	Catalonia	6	(0)

Managerial career
- 1923: Philippines
Medal record
Philippines
Far Eastern Championship Games
Silver medal – second place	1923 Osaka	Team
- * Club domestic league appearances and goals

Manuel Amechazurra (born Manuel Amechazurra Guazo; March 8, 1888 – February 13, 1965), nicknamed "Amecha" and dubbed as "El Aventurero" and "El Capitán", was a Philippine-born Spanish, mostly known for being a footballer who played as a defender and the first Filipino/Asian-born player to play in Europe. He is most renowned for his two spells at FC Barcelona and for being one of its first captains while playing a total of 200 games in the first team with 22 goals scored.

Amechazurra was one of the most important figures in the amateur beginnings of FC Barcelona, serving as its captain for 5 years between 1909 and 1914, and thus playing a crucial role in Barça's huge sporting success of the early 1910s, winning four championships in Catalonia, three Copa del Reys in Spain and four Pyrenees Cups in a row. In addition to his contributions on the field, he was also one of the club's first undercover professional.

== Club career ==
=== Early years ===
Born in La Carlota, Negros Occidental, Philippines, his family took him and brought him in Spain, in 1892, when he was still a kid. After his move and after he settled in Barcelona as a young man, he began playing football at his local club FC Irish in 1902. In Irish, Amechazurra stood out as an extraordinary defender, which earned him a move to FC Barcelona in 1906. Just after two years at Barça, he moved to England in 1908 where he played for several clubs such as St. Boniface's College and Stoke Chuchife. In England, he learned the most modern techniques and tactics, which he transported back to Barcelona when he returned in 1909.

=== Return to Barcelona ===
He played at FC Barcelona until 1915, almost a whole decade with the brief exception of his travels around the world (Philippines, Japan etc.) which made him known among his colleagues with the nickname of "El Aventurero" (the Adventurer). He formed a great defensive partnership with José Irízar. Together with Carles Comamala, Amechazurra was the fundamental head behind piece in Barcelona's first great team, which also had the likes of Paco Bru, Alfredo Massana, the Wallace brothers (Charles and Percy), Pepe Rodríguez and Barcelona's second all-time leading goal-scorer and countryman Paulino Alcántara, but it was Amechazurra who was named the team's captain. No one disputed this decision in a time when the captain had the duty of dictating the tactics to be followed (since the coach as we know him today did not exist back then) and who had to make up the line-ups and game plans. Amecha, at that moment referred to, as "El Capitan", led and captained the blaugrana to five Catalan championships including three back-to-back titles between 1909 and 1911, along with four Pyrenees Cups in a row between 1910 and 1913, and three Copa del Rey titles in 1910, 1912 and 1913. In the latter's final, Barça needed three games to beat Real Sociedad and Amechazurra captained in all of them, including the decisive game which Barça won 2–1. Amechazurra played a total of 200 games in the first team and scored 22 goals.

He is considered to be the club's first undercover professional at a time when football was amateur. He earned 300 pesetas in disguise in exchange for teaching English to some executives, despite opposition from Joan Gamper. Thanks to his English speaking abilities and his connections in England, the first anglophone players and coaches arrived at Barça, William Charles Lambe, Jack Greenwell, Frank Allack and Alex Steel. A few months later, players like José Irízar or Alfredo Massana also started to get paid in disguise.

== International career ==
Like many other FC Barcelona players of his time, he played several matches for the Catalan national team in the early 1910s, being one of the eleven footballers who played in the team's first-ever game recognized by FIFA on 20 February 1912, which ended in a 0–7 loss to France.

== Managerial career ==
Amecha, briefly, coached the Philippines National Football Team in the sixth edition of the Far Eastern Games in Osaka, in 1923. His team was influenced by the absence of several players and had to rely on some junior division players, all college students aged 16 to 18. Prior to the Far East Games he and the team had beaten a British/Spanish selection with a 2-0 win result in Manila. Amecha's first game at the tournament begun with a 0-3 loss, against Filipinos' rivals China, which saw a brawl break out leading to a full-scale battle and members of the crowd were also involved. The two sides, however, agreed to finish the game after the police managed to restore order. The next game against Japan did not start as Amecha hoped, as his team conceaded after 5 minutes, despite the rough start, the Filipinos were able to turn it around in the last minutes of the game, resulting in a 2-1 victory and a silver medal for Amecha and his team.

== Career as a referee ==
Amechazurra also took the role of a referee during his football career. He, also, was the administrator of the Colegio de Árbitros and the last match he refereed in Spain was in 1916. His most notorious game, was the match between the Philippines and China at the 1934 Far Eastern Games in Manila, played at the newly constructed Rizal Memorial Sports Complex in front of 40.000 people and following a 2-hour Games opening ceremony. Amecha, however, knew he would've referred a game between two teams, whose rivalry started since the beginning of the tournament in 1913 and as it happened in the previous editions, especially in 1923 when he coached the Philippines, it was a rough and violent match. For the Chinese, Amechazurra judged the game as a "hometown" referee, him being born in the country, allowing some brutal fouls and not awarding them a penalty when Filipino defender Cirilo De Guzmán handled the ball. However, Amecha also disallowed a goal in favor of the Filipinos as it came from an assist pass after the ball had crossed the touchline and was out of play. After that it was a battlefield, as described by the newspapers later, between the sides and when it was over it saw six players come out with injuries including fractures (4 from China and 2 from the Philippines).

== Personal life ==
He was born to Alejandro Amechazurra of Basque origins and Pilar Guazo of Cantabrian origins. He studied Law and Medicine but without finishing his school education. Known more for his involvement in football, mostly as a player-captain then manager, director of Barça and referee, he practiced other sports at a high level. Athletics, swimming and especially fencing, in which, he won the first Campeonato de la Asociación de Esgrima de Barcelona in the sabre discipline in 1916. He participated in the Copa Inter-Salas for teams in 1912, Copa Alfredo Conde in 1913, Concurso Nacional in the foil discipline and in the Concurso Internacional also in the sabre discipline in 1914.

He travelled around the world even for brief moments, so the nickname of "El Aventurero". In 1916, when he returned to his "home" country, in the Philippines he went to Manila where he kicked-off his acting career and founded the Teatro Español de Filipinas, as well as being a stage director. Amechazurra was married to Luisa de Aguirre with whom he had daughters. He was an English teacher, a journalist and him being bilingual was also a translator (Agatha Christie's books, for example). Amechazurra, in his time at the Philippines, was a strong advocate of the Spanish language and its cultural heritage in the country.

In 1946 Manuel Amechazurra returned to Barcelona with more than 500 surviving Spaniards and Spanish-Filipino, accompanied by his wife and his daughters. His former club, Barça, helped him financially in this difficult return. He died in Barcelona on February 13, 1965, exactly one year after his fellow countryman and friend Paulino Alcántara.

His grandson Gerardo Amechazurra is an actor, presenter, cartoonist designer and was one of the creators of the successful children's and youth program on Spanish Television "La Bola de Cristal" (1984-1988).

== Honours ==
=== Player ===
Barcelona

- Copa del Rey(3): 1910, 1912 and 1913
- Campeonato de Cataluña(4): 1908–1909, 1909–1910, 1910–1911, 1912–1913
- Pyrenees Cup(4): 1910, 1911, 1912 and 1913

=== Manager ===
Philippine national football team

- Far Eastern Championship Games (Silver medal): 1923
