= Ricard Graells =

Spanish footballer

15th President of Atlético Madrid
- In office 10 June 1919 – 27 June 1920
- Preceded by: Joan Gamper
- Succeeded by: Gaspar Rosés

Personal details
- Born: Unknown Barcelona, Spain
- Died: 11 December 1949 Barcelona, Spain
Association football career
- Full name: Ricard Graells Miró
- Position: Forward
Senior career*
Years	Team	Apps	(Gls)
1910	FC Barcelona		
- * Club domestic league appearances and goals

Ricard Graells (Unknown - 11 December 1949) was the 15th president of FC Barcelona from 10 June 1919 to 27 June 1920. He took over the club after the founder Joan Gamper resigned presidency for the third time. Under his presidency the team won the double in 1920, the Campionat de Catalunya and the Copa del Rey.

== Biography ==
Although little has been recorded of his playing career, he was one of the members that participated in the inaugural edition of the Pyrenees Cup, netting two very important goals, one in a 1–1 draw with Olympique de Cette in the semi-finals and the other in a 2–1 win over Real Sociedad in the final, thus contributing decisively in the club's first piece of international silverware.

Before becoming president, Graells had been part of the club's board of directors in 1916 and 1917, with Gaspar Rosés as president. He then became vice-president (1918), and finally reached the presidency of the club on 10 June 1919, when Joan Gamper resigned for the third time. His mandate was very positive, with the club reaching 3,217 members, with a monthly average of 131 registrations and 44 deregistrations. Also under his presidency he increased the cost of membership from two to three pesetas, and paid off a debt of 16,110 pesetas inherited from the previous board, making the club debt-free for the first time in its 20-year history.

The club also achieved great sporting success under Graells' leadership, winning the double in 1920, the Campionat de Catalunya and the Copa del Rey after beating Athletic Bilbao 2–0 in the final. At the end of the season, on 27 June 1920, a massive assembly of members was held, which saw the election of Gaspar Rosés, who thus began his second term at the helm of Barça.

== Honours ==
=== Club ===
FC Barcelona

- Catalan championship:
  - Champions (1): 1909–10
- Pyrenees Cup:
  - Champions (1): 1910

== See also ==
- List of FC Barcelona presidents
