= George Pattullo (footballer) =

Scottish footballer and manager

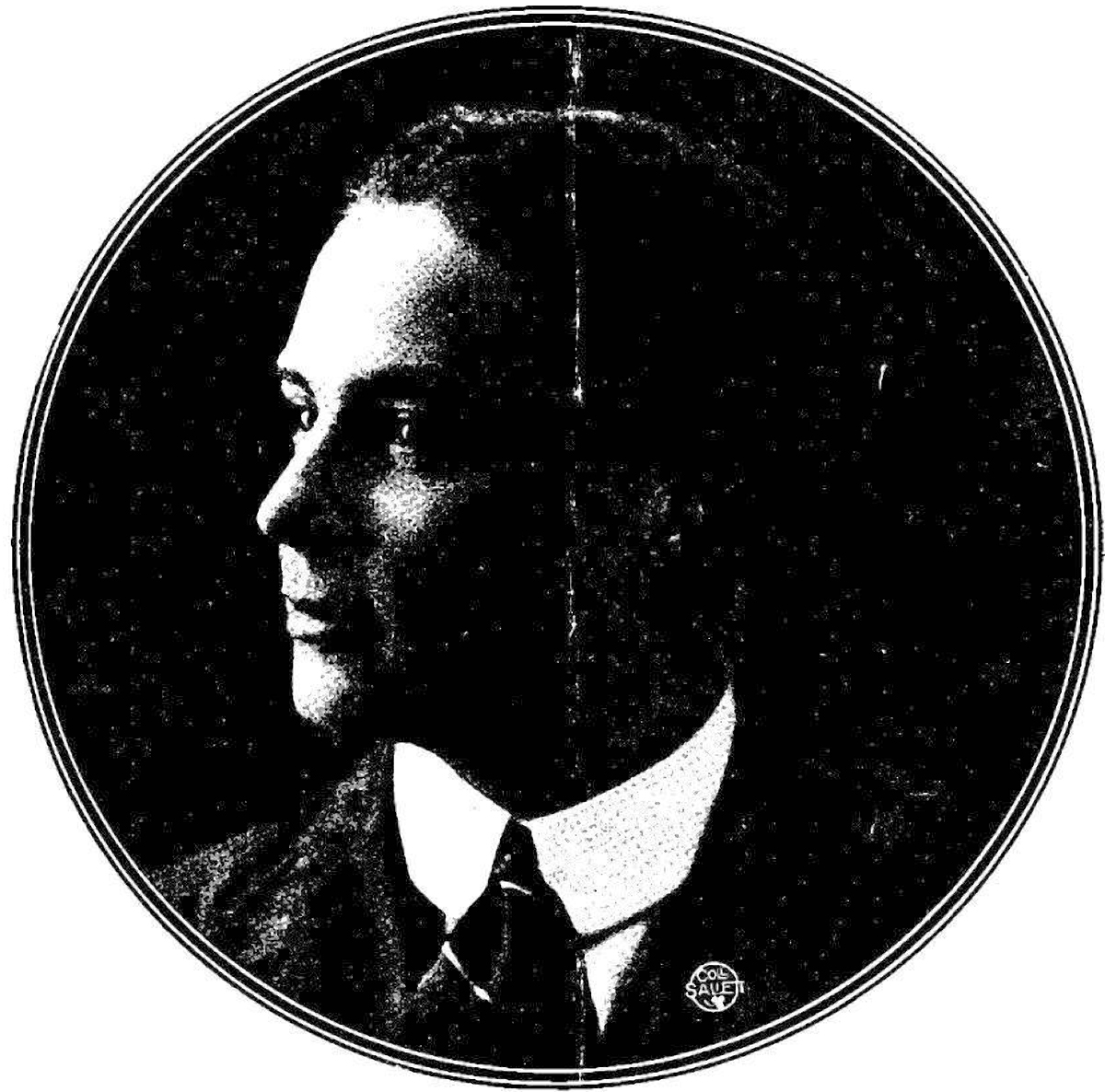

Personal information
- Full name: George Simpson Drynan Pattullo
- Date of birth: 4 November 1888
- Place of birth: Glasgow, Scotland
- Date of death: 5 September 1953 (aged 64)
- Place of death: Putney, England
- Positions: Goalkeeper; forward

Senior career*
Years	Team	Apps	(Gls)
1910–1911	Barcelona	23	(41)
1912	Barcelona	1	(2)
Total		24	(43)

Managerial career
- 1930: Club Baleares
- * Club domestic league appearances and goals

George Simpson Drynan Pattullo (4 November 1888 – 5 September 1953) was a Scottish football player and manager active primarily in Spain. He has been described as FC Barcelona's "most important and influential British player of all time." In addition to playing football, Pattullo was also active in hockey, rugby, and tennis.

== Biography ==
Born in Glasgow, Pattulo moved to Barcelona in Spain whilst working as a coal trader, playing rugby, field hockey, tennis and eventually football there. In 1910, having just arrived in Barcelona, he was discovered by Joan Gamper in a friendly match between the British colony of Barcelona and the Universitari, in which Pattullo started as a goalkeeper before coming out to score five goals. Gamper convinced him to join FC Barcelona, where he became a forward.

He made his football debut for FC Barcelona on 24 September 1910, and scored 41 goals in just 23 matches during the 1910–11 season, playing for the club between September 1910 and May 1911, when he had to return to his homeland Scotland on business. However, in March 1912, he returned to Barcelona from Scotland in order to play the quarter-finals of the 1912 Pyrenees Cup on 10 March against city rivals Espanyol, netting two goals to help Barça to a 3–2 win in what was his last match for the club, which went on to win the tournament after beating Stade Bordelais 5–3 in the final. FC Barcelona paid for his hotel, but due to his loyalty to his amateur status, he returned the whole amount to the club. Pattullo remained as an amateur player, and refused to sign for Espanyol. A few days later he returned to Scotland for good only to return in April 1928 to take the honorary kick-off in a La Liga match between Barcelona and Real Oviedo at the Camp de Les Corts.

He left Barcelona before World War I, returning to Great Britain to join the Tyneside Scottish Brigade; he was awarded the Military Cross, during the Battle of the Somme. He also managed Club Baleares briefly in 1930. He returned to Spain in 1928 thinking the climate would help him with his recovery from being gassed during the War.
