= Enrique Peris =

Spanish footballer

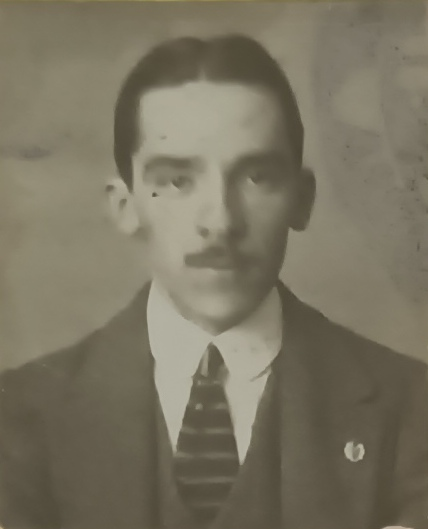

Personal information
- Full name: Enrique Peris de Vargas
- Birth name: Enric Peris de Vargas
- Date of birth: 27 February 1887
- Place of birth: Barcelona, Catalonia, Spain
- Date of death: 17 February 1953 (aged 65)
- Place of death: Catalonia, Spain
- Position: Left winger

Senior career*
Years	Team	Apps	(Gls)
1903–1906	FC Internacional		
1906–1917	FC Barcelona	308	(34)

International career
1909-1916	Catalonia	10	(0)
Medal record
Catalonia
Prince of Asturias Cup
Silver medal – second place	1915 Prince of Asturias Cup
- * Club domestic league appearances and goals

Enrique Peris de Vargas (27 February 1887 - 17 February 1953) was a Spanish footballer who played as a left winger. He spent most of his career at Barcelona, with whom he played over 300 matches, and won three Copa del Reys and five Catalan Championships. He played numerous times with the Catalan national team, and as an athlete, he stood out in the 100m dash and the long jump. He also worked as a referee.

His brothers Agustin, Joaquim, and Lisandro were also outstanding sportsmen and leaders.

== Playing career ==
=== Club career ===
Born in Barcelona, he began his football career in 1903 at FC Internacional. Together with Paco Bru, Charles Wallace, and his older brother Agustin, he helped the club achieve three successive runner-up finishes in the Catalan championship between 1904 and 1906, losing out on the title to a different opponent each time, Club Español (now RCD Espanyol) FC Barcelona and X Sporting Club respectively. In 1906, the club had to suspend its activities due to a lack of players, and most of the players, including him, joined Barcelona in the 1906-07 season, playing first as a midfielder and finally as a left-winger.

He played for Barça for more than a decade, becoming the first player to reach 200 official matches with the club. In total, he played 308 matches and scored 34 goals. Peris was an integral piece in Barcelona's first great team, which had the likes of Alfredo Massana, Manuel Amechazurra and Pepe Rodríguez, as well as fellow FC Internacional teammates Bru and Wallace. Together with them, he helped the club win five Catalan championships including three successive titles between 1909 and 1911, along with four back-to-back Pyrenees Cups between 1910 and 1913, and three Copa del Rey titles in 1910, 1912 and 1913. In the latter's final, Barça needed three games to beat Real Sociedad and Peris started in all of them.

=== International career ===
Like many other FC Barcelona players at the time, Peris was summoned by the Catalonia national team for 10 games, one of which was the team's first-ever game recognized by FIFA on 20 February 1912, which ended in a 0-7 loss to France. A few days earlier, on 11 February, he had been one of the eleven players that had faced a weaker side of France, helping Catalonia to a 2-0 win. He also represented the Catalan team in the first edition of the Prince of Asturias Cup in 1915, an inter-regional competition organized by the RFEF.

== Athletic career ==
In addition to football, Peris also stood out in athletic events, such as the 100m dash and the long jump. Even though he had great technical quality with a ball on his feet, he was discussed for his lack of spirit, since his way of playing, slow and cerebral, was totally opposite to the speed he possessed. For instance, in the 100 meters, he achieved 11.6 seconds in 1909, an unreliable 10.8 seconds in 1910 and another even more implausible 10.4 seconds in 1911.

In September 1912, on the occasion of the inaugural Olot Deportivo festivities, Peris proclaimed himself the winner of the general athletics classification.

== Refereeing career ==
In 1912, Peris published a book called "Regulations of the Game of foot-ball and Application of its Rules". Peris began his refereeing career shortly after he retired in 1917, overseeing matches of the Central Championship, and even of the Copa del Rey. In total, he oversaw more than 50 games. He later became the treasurer of the Catalan College of Referees.

Together with Eulogio Aranguren and Ezequiel Montero, he holds the peculiar distinction of having participated in the Prince of Asturias Cup as both a player and referee, given that Peris played in the 1915 edition and then refereed one match in the competition, a quarter-final between Valencia and Andalusia in the 1922–23 edition, ending in a 2-1 win to the Andalusians.

== Honours ==
=== Club ===
Barcelona

- Catalan championship:
  - Champions (5): 1908–09, 1909–10, 1910–11, 1912–13, 1915–16
- Pyrenees Cup:
  - Champions (4): 1910, 1911, 1912 and 1913
- Copa del Rey:
  - Champions (3): 1910, 1912 and 1913

=== International ===
Catalonia

- Prince of Asturias Cup:
  - Runner-up (1): 1915
