= Pyrenees Cup =

- Founded: 1910
- Abolished: 1914; 112 years ago
- Region: Marca Hispanica
- Teams: 6 to 11
- Last champions: FC Espanya (1914)
- Most championships: FC Barcelona (4 titles)

The Pyrenees Cup (Spanish: Copa Pirineos), officially Challenge International du Sud de la France, was an international football competition contested by Spanish and French clubs based in the territories of Pyrénées (Catalonia, the Basque Country, Languedoc, Midi-Pyrénées and Aquitaine). There have been five tournaments for the Pyrenees Cup which were held between 1910 and 1914 with the final of the championship being held in the region's capital, Toulouse. However, the last two finals were held in Barcelona. The competition was played for 5 years, from 1910 to 1914, before disappearing due to the first World War. The tournament stopped due to the beginning of World War I in 1914. It was organized by the Pyrenees Committee (Comitè des Pyrénées), which was one of the regional bodies of the USFSA (the predecessor of the French Football Federation), in charge of the competitions in the south of France.

The Cup was one of the first international football competitions in Europe together with the Challenge Cup (1897–1911), Coupe Van der Straeten Ponthoz (1900–1907) and the Sir Thomas Lipton Trophy (1909–1911).

The great star of this competition was FC Barcelona, the winner of the first four editions, having at the time what was their first great team. The fifth and last was won by FC Espanya de Barcelona before it had to be suspended due to the outbreak of the war.

== History ==
The forerunner of the Pyrenees Cup was the Challenge International du Nord, a competition organized since 1898, and in which, initially, clubs from the north of France and Belgium participated. In 1909, given the success that the northern competition had achieved, and despite the fact that the French Championship organized by the USFSA had gradually been extended to all the clubs in the country, an Occitan patron (Monsieur Labat) from the Committee of the Pyrenees of the USFSA had the initiative to carry out a similar competition in the south of France, extended to some Spanish clubs, and thus the Challenge International du Sud de la France was born. In Spain, however, the competition was commonly known as Copa Pirineos.

== 1910 Pyrenees Cup ==
The initial championship in 1910 was held in the road, and was only for teams that were from the USFSA regional committees of Languedoc, Midi-Pyrénées or Aquitaine, and for teams from the FECF (the predecessor of the Spanish Football Federation) regional committees of Catalonia and Basque Country, such as the ones in the cities of Irún, San Sebastián and Barcelona. The hosts, Languedoc, sent two teams Olympique de Cette (now known as FC Sète 34) and Sporting Club de Nîmes. Midi-Pyrénées also sent two teams Stade toulousain and Sporting Club Toulousain, while Catalonia and the Basque Country sent FC Barcelona and the newly formed Sociedad de Futbol, which was renamed as Real Sociedad just a few months later when King Alfonso XIII granted the club the title of Real in February 1910. Despite their eligibility to participate, Irún and Aquitaine sent no teams, thus the first edition was contested by 6 teams from four regions.

The two teams of Midi-Pyrénées faced each other in the first round just as the Languedoc's teams, with Olympique de Cette and Stade toulousain winning and thus reaching the semi-finals where they were eliminated by the two Spanish clubs. While Sociedad trashed toulousain with a resounding 8–0 win, Barça drew with Olympique at 1, so extra-time was to be played, but Olympique refused to do so claiming tiredness; so Barcelona qualified to the final where they beat Sociedad 2–1 thanks to first-half goals from Ricard Graells and Pepe Rodríguez, the latter having just landed in FC Barcelona with barely no time to meet his teammates, but despite that he still managed to score a title-winning goal on his debut.

=== Results ===
Quarter-finals
(Catalonia) FC Barcelona
bye
27 February 1910 – Montpellier
(Languedoc) Olympique de Cette	3
(Languedoc) Sporting Club de Nîmes	0
(Basque Country (autonomous community)) Real Sociedad
bye
27 February 1910 – Toulouse
(Toulouse) Stade toulousain
(Toulouse) Sporting Club Toulousain	Forfeit

Semi-finals
24 April 1910 – Sète
(Catalonia) FC Barcelona	1
(Languedoc) Olympique de Cette	1 (Withdrew)
17 April 1910 – San Sebastián
(Basque Country (autonomous community)) Real Sociedad	8
(Toulouse) Stade toulousain	0

Final
1 May 1910 – Toulouse
(Catalonia) FC Barcelona	2
(Basque Country (autonomous community)) Real Sociedad	1

=== Semi-final ===
17 April 1910

Stade toulousain	0 – 8	Real Sociedad
	Report1; Report2	Simmons 15'; Goitisolo 25', 70'; Lacort 30', 50', 55', 80'; McGuinness 75'

Ondarreta Stadium, San Sebastián, Basque Country
Referee: Naudy
24 April 1910

Olympique de Cette	1 – 1	FC Barcelona
Allias (1T)	Report1	Graells (2T)

Referee: Monsieur Labat

=== Final ===
1 May 1910
Final

FC Barcelona	2 – 1	Real Sociedad de Fútbol
Graells 35'; Pepe Rodríguez 42'	Report1; Report2	Prast 30'

Ponts-Jumeaux, Toulouse, Midi-Pyrénées
Referee: Monsieur Labat

=== Top Scorers ===
Rank	Player	Team	Goals
1	Mariano Lacort	Real Sociedad	4
2	Nicasio Goitisolo	Real Sociedad	2
2	Ricard Graells	FC Barcelona	2

== 1911 Pyrenees Cup ==
In the second edition of the competition the participation expanded to all regional committees in the South of France: Côte d'Argent (Stade Bordelais), Pays basque (Biarritz Stade), Côte d'Azur (no teams) and Littoral (Olympique de Marseille, Etoile Bleue de Marseille, Stade Helvétique de Marseille), meaning that the numbers of participants rose from just 6 to 11 teams. Eight teams had to face each other in the preliminary rounds for the remaining 3 spots in the quarter-finals, which were occupied by Olympique de Marseille, Olympique de Cette and Sporting Club Irún. The latter were eliminated in the quarter-finals by Stade Bordelais after declining to play extra-time following a 3–3 draw. In the semi-finals FC Barcelona beat Olympique de Cette again, this time 2–1, courtesy of a brace from Carles Comamala, who also scored once in the final against Stade Bordelais to help his side with a 4–2, with the remaining Barça goals coming from the Wallace brothers, Charles and Percival (2).

=== Preliminary round ===
==== First round ====
- Olympique de Marseille ?–? Etoile Bleue de Marseille (12 February)
- Sporting Club de Nîmes ?–? US Calvissonnaisse (12 March)

==== Second round ====
- Olympique de Marseille ?–? Stade Helvétique de Marseille (2 April)
- Olympique de Cette ?–? Sporting Club de Nîmes (2 April)
- Sporting Club Irún ?–? Biarritz Stade (26 March)

=== Results ===
Quarter-finals
(Catalonia) FC Barcelona
bye
23 April 1911 – Nîmes
(Languedoc) Olympique de Cette	1
Olympique de Marseille	0
23 April 1911 – Dax
(Bordeaux) Stade Bordelais	3
(Gipuzkoa) Sporting Club Irún	3 Forfeit
(Toulouse) Stade toulousain
bye

Semi-finals
7 May 1911 – Barcelona
(Catalonia) FC Barcelona	2
(Languedoc) Olympique de Cette	1
7 May 1911 – Bordeaux
(Bordeaux) Stade Bordelais	2
(Toulouse) Stade toulousain	1

Final
14 May 1911 – Toulouse
(Catalonia) FC Barcelona	4
(Bordeaux) Stade Bordelais	2

=== Semi-final ===
7 May 1911
15:45

FC Barcelona	2 – 1	Olympique de Cette
Comamala	Report	Unknown

Camp de la Indústria, Barcelona, Catalonia
Referee: Monsieur Labat
7 May 1911

Stade Bordelais	2 – 1	Stade toulousain
Lassalle; Bedey	Report	Marquis

Route du Médoc, Bordeaux

=== Final ===
14 May 1911

FC Barcelona	4 – 2 (a.e.t.)	Stade Bordelais
P. Wallace; C. Wallace; Comamala	Report	Mauret; Lucas

Ponts-Jumeaux, Toulouse, Midi-Pyrénées
Referee: Naudy

Note: There is confusion about which Wallace brother netted two goals, with some sources such as RSSSF claiming it was Percy while others such as CIHEFE listing Charles as the author of the brace.

=== Top Scorers ===
Rank	Player	Team	Goals
1	Carles Comamala	FC Barcelona	3
2	Percival Wallace	FC Barcelona	2

== 1912 Pyrenees Cup ==
The third edition was contested by 9 teams and saw FC Barcelona having to start from the quarter-finals for the first time, beating RCD Espanyol 3–2, thanks to goals from their Scottish forwards George Pattullo (2) and Alexander Steel. However, the game was wrapped up in controversy as Espanyol filed a formal protest with the USFSA over the refereeing of Hamilton, but the protest was thrown out. FC Barcelona and Stade Bordelais proved to be the strongest teams in the Pyrenees once more by again reaching the final of the tournament to play the re-match of the previous final. Interestingly, none of them had to play the semi-final as both their opponents Forfeited for different reasons: Club Nîmes could not find enough players to make the trip, while Real Sociedad were unwilling to pay for the cost of transportation. The final was held on 5 May 1912 at Toulouse, and saw Barcelona triumph 5–3 to lift the trophy for the third time in a row. Antonio Morales was the hero of the game with a hat-trick, while Alfredo Massana and Pepe Rodríguez netted one goal each to seal the victory, with the latter becoming the first to score in two different finals, having already netted in the 1910 final.

=== Results ===
Round of 16
17 March - Sète
(Languedoc) Sporting Club de Nîmes	3
(Languedoc) Olympique de Cette	1
17 March - Bordeaux
(Bordeaux) Stade Bordelais	5
La Comète et Simiot Bordeaux	2

Quarter-finals
10 March - Barcelona
(Catalonia) FC Barcelona	3
(Catalonia) RCD Espanyol	2
21 April - Nîmes
(Languedoc) Sporting Club de Nîmes	6
Olympique de Marseille	2
21 April - Toulouse
(Bordeaux) Stade Bordelais	1
(Toulouse) Stade toulousain	0

Semi-finals
28 April - Barcelona
(Catalonia) FC Barcelona
(Languedoc) Sporting Club de Nîmes	Forfeit
28 April - Bordeaux
(Bordeaux) Stade Bordelais
(Catalonia) Real Sociedad	Forfeit

Final
5 May – Toulouse
(Catalonia) FC Barcelona	5
(Bordeaux) Stade Bordelais	3

=== Final ===
5 May 1912

FC Barcelona	5 – 3	Stade Bordelais
Morales 45'; Massana; Pepe Rodríguez	Report1; Report2	? (?) ?

Ponts-Jumeaux, Toulouse, Midi-Pyrénées
Referee: (France) Ginesty

=== Top Scorers ===
Rank	Player	Team	Goals
1	Antonio Morales	FC Barcelona	3
2	George Pattullo	FC Barcelona	2

== 1913 Pyrenees Cup ==
Barcelona trashed Casual SC 7–0 in the quarter-finals and La Comète et Simiot 7–2 in the final to lift the trophy for the fourth time in a row. However, they actually lost the semi-finals 1–3 to RCD Espanyol, but luckily for them, they managed to revert the situation when the result was annulled.

1913 Pyrenees Cup
FC Barcelona
Fourth title

== 1914 Pyrenees Cup ==
The 5th and last tournament of the Pyrenees Cup saw FC Espanya de Barcelona win the tournament after beating La Comète et Simiot 3–1 in the final, thus becoming the first team other than FC Barcelona to win the competition, which they knocked out in the semi-finals with a resounding 5–2 win that prompted a pitch invasion.

1914 Pyrenees Cup
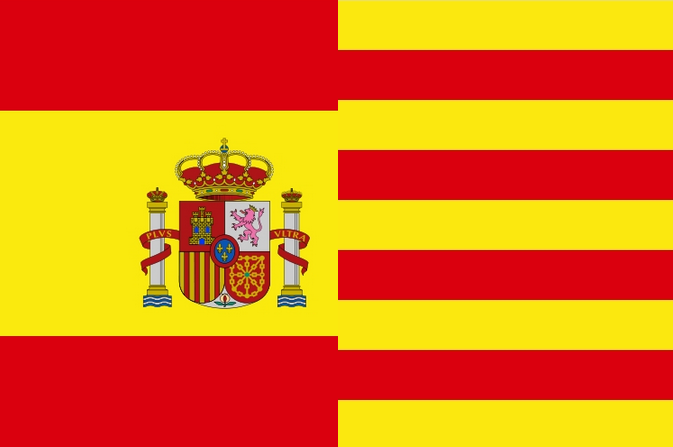
FC Espanya
First title

== Champions ==
=== List of finals ===
Year	Venue	Champion	Runner-up	Results
1910	Sète	FC Barcelona	Real Sociedad	2–1
1911	Toulouse	FC Barcelona	Stade Bordelais	4–2
1912	Toulouse	FC Barcelona	Stade Bordelais	5–3
1913	Barcelona	FC Barcelona	Comète Simotes Bordeaux	7–2
1914	Barcelona	FC Espanya de Barcelona	Comète Simotes Bordeaux	3–1

=== Winning line-up ===
Year	Team Champion	Champion line-up
1910	FC Barcelona	Solà; Bru, Amechazurra; Peris, Aguirreche, Grau; Forns, Graells, Carles Comamala, Pepe Rodríguez, Charles Wallace
1911	FC Barcelona	Renyé; Bru, Amechazurra; Quirante, Peris, Grau; Forns, Percival Wallace, Carles Comamala, Charles Wallace, Espelta
1912	FC Barcelona	L. Peris; Irízar, Amechazurra; Berdié, Alfredo Massana, Wilson; Pakán, Pepe Rodríguez, Steel, Morales, Forns
1913	FC Barcelona	Renyé; Berrondo, Amechazurra; Rositzky, Massana, Greenwell; Forns, Allack, Berdié, Alcántara, Peris
1914	FC Espanya de Barcelona	Puig; Ribera, Mariné; Prat, Casellas, Salvó I; Villena, Baró, Bellavista, Passaní, Salvó II

=== Most successful teams ===
Club	Championships	Runners-up
FC Barcelona	4	0
FC Espanya	1	0
Comète Simotes Bordeaux	0	2
Gars Bordeaux FC	0	1
Real Sociedad	0	1
Stade Bordelais	0	1

=== Most successful regions ===
Club	Championships	Runners-up
Catalonia	5	0
Aquitaine	0	4
Basque Country	0	1

== Records and statistics ==
=== Top scorers per tournament ===
Tournament	Name	Team	Goals
1910	(Catalonia) Mariano Lacort	Real Sociedad	4
1911	(Catalonia) Carles Comamala	FC Barcelona	3
1912	(Spain) Antonio Morales	FC Barcelona	3
1913	(Scotland) Alexander Steel	FC Barcelona	3
1913	(England) Frank Allack	FC Barcelona	3
1914	(Catalonia) Jaime Bellavista	FC Espanya	5

=== Most goals in a single tournament ===
Ranking	Name	Team	Goals	Tournament
1	(Catalonia) Jaime Bellavista	FC Espanya	5	1914
2	(Catalonia) Mariano Lacort	Real Sociedad	4	1910
3	(Catalonia) Carles Comamala	FC Barcelona	3	1911
3	(Spain) Antonio Morales	FC Barcelona	3	1912
3	(Scotland) Alexander Steel	FC Barcelona	3	1913
3	(England) Frank Allack	FC Barcelona	3	1913
3	(Catalonia) Gabriel Bau	FC Barcelona	3	1914

=== All-time top goalscorers ===
Rank	Name	Team	Goals	Tournament(s)
1	(Spain) Antonio Morales	FC Barcelona and Real Sociedad	5	1912 (3) and 1913 (2)
1	(Catalonia) Jaime Bellavista	FC Espanya	5	1914 (5)
3	(Catalonia) Mariano Lacort	Real Sociedad	4	1910 (4)
3	(Scotland) Alexander Steel	FC Barcelona	4	1912 (1) and 1913 (3)
3	(England) Percival Wallace	FC Barcelona	4	1911 (2) and 1914 (2)
6	(Catalonia) Carles Comamala	FC Barcelona	3	1912 (3)
6	(Catalonia) Paulino Alcántara	FC Barcelona	3	1913 (2) and 1914 (1)
6	(England) Frank Allack	FC Barcelona	3	1913 (3)
6	(Catalonia) Gabriel Bau	FC Barcelona	3	1914 (3)

Notable figures with two goals include Pepe Rodríguez (1 goal in 1910 and 1912), Alfredo Massana (1 goal in 1912 and 1913), Apolinario Rodríguez (2 goal in 1913) and José Berdié (2 goals in 1913).

=== Hat-tricks ===
From the first official tournament in 1910, until its last 4 years later, four hat-tricks have been scored, two of which were pokers. The first treble of the Pyrenees Cup was scored by Mariano Lacort on 17 April 1910 in the inaugural edition of the competition, netting four goals to help Real Sociedad beat Stade toulousain 8–0. It's worth mentioning that this was the only time Lacort found the back of the net in the Pyrenees Cup, but despite that his 4-goal haul alone makes him one of the all-time top goal scorers in the competition's history. The last hat-trick was scored by Jaime Bellavista on 29 March 1914, when he netted four goals for FC Espanya in a 5–2 win over FC Barcelona in the semi-finals of the last edition of the competition. The only player to have scored a hat-trick in a final was Antonio Morales to help Barça to a 5–2 victory over Stade Bordelais.

Pyrenees Cup hat-tricks
#	Player	G	For	Result	Against	Tournament	Stage	Date	Ref
1.	Mariano Lacort	4	Real Sociedad	8–0	Stade toulousain	1910 Pyrenees Cup	Semi-finals	17 April 1910	
2.	Antonio Morales	3	FC Barcelona	5–2	Stade Bordelais	1912 Pyrenees Cup	Final	5 May 1912	
3.	Alexander Steel	3	FC Barcelona	8–0	Casual SC	1913 Pyrenees Cup	Quarter-finals	30 March 1913	
4.	Jaime Bellavista	4	FC Espanya	5–2	FC Barcelona	1914 Pyrenees Cup	Semi-finals	29 March 1914	

=== Other records ===
Pepe Rodríguez and Alfredo Massana hold the peculiar distinction of being the only ones to have scored in two different finals: Pepe netted the winning goal in the 1910 final and another in the 1912 final, while Massana (a midfielder) is the only one to have netted a goal in back-to-back finals with goals in the 1912 and 1913 finals. Interestingly, those are the only goals they scored in the competition.

Manuel Amechazurra and José Berrondo hold the unwanted distinction of being the only players to have scored an own goal in the competition. Both were FC Barcelona defenders, both did it in the 1913 edition, however, their side still managed to win the tournament.

== See also ==
- Challenge International du Nord (1898–1914)
- Copa Macaya (1900–1903)
- Catalan championship
