= Charles Wallace (footballer) =

English footballer (1885–1942)

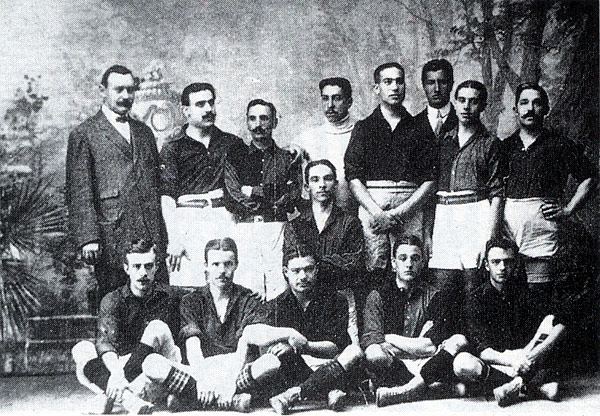
- Wallace Midgley (seated, second from the left) in 1910

Personal information
- Full name: Charles William Wallace Midgley
- Date of birth: 20 January 1885
- Place of birth: Lewisham, London, England
- Date of death: 13 December 1942 (aged 57)
- Place of death: Barcelona, Catalonia, Spain
- Position: Forward

Senior career*
Years	Team	Apps	(Gls)
1905–1906	FC Internacional		
1906–1907	FC Català		
1907–1911	FC Barcelona	25	(29)
1911–1912	RCD Espanyol		
1912–1913	Casual SC		
1913–1915	FC Barcelona		
- * Club domestic league appearances and goals

Charles William Wallace Midgley (20 January 1885 – 13 December 1942) was an English footballer who played as a forward for Spanish club FC Barcelona. Along with his younger brother, Percival, he was part of the first great team of FC Barcelona, with whom he scored 105 goals in just 102 matches, although this tally includes goals scored in friendlies and unofficial games.

== Club career ==
Born in London, his family moved to Barcelona when he was still a child. He began his career in 1905 at FC Internacional, featuring alongside the likes of Enrique Peris and Paco Bru. He helped the club achieve a runner-up finish in the 1905–06 Catalan championship, losing the title to X Sporting Club. In 1906, the club had to suspend its activities due to a lack of players, and while most of the remaining players joined FC Barcelona, Wallace instead went to FC Català, but eventually also joined Barça in 1907. In 1908, he played one game for Madrid CF on loan from Barcelona, a common practice at the time, when it was allowed to call up players from other teams. After that match, he continued to play for Barcelona.

Wallace was an integral piece of Barcelona's first great team in the early 1910s, which had the likes of Carles Comamala, Alfredo Massana, Manuel Amechazurra and Pepe Rodríguez, as well as former FC Internacional teammates Bru and Peris. Together with them, he helped the club win the Catalan championships three times in a row between 1909 and 1911, along with two Pyrenees Cups (1910 and 1911), and one Copa del Rey in 1910, in which he proved to be vital since in the final he netted Barça's first goal in an eventual 3–2 comeback win over Español de Madrid.

In October 1911, President of Barcelona Joan Gamper expelled several players from the club including Wallace Midgley, following a friendly match against Valencia, who were accused of keeping the proceeds, causing a schism in the club with the advocates of amateurism. Afterwards, Charles signed for RCD Espanyol together with his brother, and shortly before the end of the year, both joined Casual SC, together with other Barcelona dissidents such as José Quirante and the Comamala brothers (Carles and Arsenio). In 1913, Casual folded due to financial reasons and the Wallace brothers returned to FC Barcelona, for whom Charles played until his retirement in 1915.

== Honours ==
=== Club ===
FC Barcelona

- Catalan championship:
  - Champions (3): 1908–09, 1909–10 and 1910–11
- Pyrenees Cup:
  - Champions (2): 1910 and 1911
- Copa del Rey:
  - Champions (1): 1910

RCD Espanyol

- Catalan championship:
  - Champions (1): 1911–12
