= Pepe Rodríguez =

Spanish footballer

José Rodríguez
Personal information
- Full name: José Rodríguez Vázquez
- Date of birth: 20 August 1889
- Place of birth: Vigo, Galicia, Spain
- Date of death: 1972 (age 83)
- Place of death: Melipilla, Chile
- Position: Forward

Senior career*
Years	Team	Apps	(Gls)
1907–1908	Vigo FC		
1908–1910	Fortuna de Vigo		
1910–1913	FC Barcelona	63	(67)

International career
1910–1912	Catalonia	+2	(0)
- * Club domestic league appearances and goals

José Rodríguez Vázquez (20 August 1889 - 1972), also known as Pepe Rodríguez, was a Spanish footballer who played as a forward for FC Barcelona. In his first season at Barcelona (1909–10), Pepe won all the titles at stake: The Catalan championship, Copa del Rey and Pyrenees Cup, and he was fundamental in Barça's triumphs as he netted the winning goal in both cup finals. Pepe scored in both cup finals in 1912 as well.

In 1912, he was part of the first-ever team fielded by the Catalan national team in an international match recognized by FIFA.

== Club career ==
Born in Vigo, he began his career in 1907 at his hometown club Vigo FC, and in his first (and only) season with them he played a pivotal role in the club's greatest achievement, reaching the 1908 Copa del Rey Final, where they were beaten 1-2 by Madrid FC. He then joined club rivals Fortuna de Vigo, with whom he played for two seasons. In Fortuna he stood out for his goal-scoring instinct, which earned him a move to FC Barcelona in 1910, making his debut on 1 May 1910, in the final of the 1910 Pyrenees Cup, despite having just landed and barely having time to meet his teammates, something that was not enough to stop him from scoring the winning goal in a 2–1 win over Real Sociedad.

He was a member of the legendary Barcelona team of the early 1910s that also included the likes of Francisco Bru, Alfredo Massana, Enrique Peris, Carles Comamala and Charles Wallace, and together with them, he helped the club win a further two Pyrenees Cup titles in 1911 and 1912, netting once in the latter as Barça beat Stade Bordelais 5–3. He also won two Copa del Rey titles in 1910 and 1912, in which Rodríguez contributed decisively, netting the winning goal in the last minute of the 1910 final as Barcelona defeated Español de Madrid 3–2, and also scoring once in the 1912 final in a 2–0 win over Sociedad Gimnástica. This means he scored at least one goal in four different finals for Barcelona, two Pyrenees Cup finals (1910 and 1912) and likewise with the Copa del Rey (1910 and 1912).

He played for Barcelona until 1912, scoring 59 goals in 62 games and winning two Catalan Championships (1910 and 1911), two Pyrenees Cups (1910 and 1911) and two Copa del Rey (1910 and 1912). He later moved to Argentina, and in 1922, he settled permanently in Chile, where he died on 1972.

== International career ==
Like many other FC Barcelona players of that time, he played for the Catalan national team during the early 1910s, however, due to the little statistical rigor that the newspapers had at that time, the exact amount of caps he earned is unknown. On 20 February 1912, Rodríguez went down in history as one of the eleven footballers who played in the first international game recognized by FIFA of the Catalonia national team in a friendly against France, that ended in a 0–7 loss.

== Honours ==
=== Club ===
Vigo FC

- Copa del Rey:
  - Runner-up (1) 1908

Barcelona

- Catalan Championships:
  - Winners (2) 1910 and 1911
- Copa del Rey:
  - Winners (2) 1910 and 1912
- Pyrenees Cup:
  - Winners (2) 1910 and 1911
