= Alfred Massana =

Spanish footballer

Personal information
- Full name: Alfredo Massana Urgellés
- Date of birth: 27 July 1891
- Place of birth: Barcelona, Catalonia, Spain
- Date of death: 24 March 1924 (aged 32)
- Place of death: Catalonia, Spain
- Position: Midfielder

Senior career*
Years	Team	Apps	(Gls)
1907–1909	X Sporting Club		
1909–1911	RCD Espanyol		
1911–1916	FC Barcelona	152	(42)
1916–1917	Terrassa FC		
1917–1918	RCD Espanyol		

International career
1910–1916	Catalonia	6	(2)
Medal record
Catalonia
Prince of Asturias Cup
Silver medal – second place	1915 Prince of Asturias Cup	Team
- * Club domestic league appearances and goals

Alfred Massana i Urgellés, also known as Alfredo Massana Urgellés (27 July 1891 – 24 March 1924), was a Spanish footballer who played as a midfielder for Espanyol and FC Barcelona. He had a great placement and vision of the game. Known as a great dribbler, he was one of the best Catalan midfielders of his time. His brother, Santiago Massana, also played for Espanyol and Barcelona. He is also the grandfather of the pianist Tete Montoliu.

== Club career ==
Born in Barcelona, he began his career in 1907 at his hometown club X Sporting Club, where he played alongside the likes of Pedro Gibert, and helped the club win back-to-back Catalan Championships in 1906–07 and 1907–08. In 1909, the club was effectively relaunched as the Club Deportivo Español, the name which still stands today. At Espanyol, he stood out as an extraordinary midfielder, which earned him a move to FC Barcelona in 1911.

He was a member of the legendary Barcelona team of the early 1910s that also included the likes of Paco Bru, Enrique Peris, Romà Forns, Carles Comamala and Pepe Rodríguez, and together with them, he won two Copa del Rey titles in 1912 and 1913. In the 1912 final he scored the opening goal in an eventual 2–0 win over Sociedad Gimnástica. He played for Barcelona until 1916, scoring 30 goals in 131 games and winning two Pyrenees Cups (1912 and 1913), two Copa del Rey (1912 and 1913) and two Catalan Championships (1912–13 and 1915–16). He later moved to Espanyol, with whom he won another in 1917–18. He died at the young age of 33, in 1924.

== International career ==
Like many other FC Barcelona players of that time, he played several matches for the Catalan national team between 1910 and 1916, scoring two goals. On 24 July 1910, Massana went down in history as one of the eleven footballers who played in Catalonia's first-ever international game (although not recognized by FIFA), which ended in a 1–3 loss to a Paris XI.

In May 1915, he was a member of the team that participated in the first edition of the Prince of Asturias Cup in 1915, an inter-regional competition organized by the RFEF.

== Honours ==
=== Club ===
X Sporting Club

- Catalan Championships:
  - Winners (2) 1906–07 and 1907–08

Barcelona

- Catalan Championships:
  - Winners (2) 1912–13 and 1915–16
- Copa del Rey:
  - Winners (2) 1912 and 1913
- Pyrenees Cup:
  - Winners (2) 1912 and 1913

Espanyol

- Catalan Championships:
  - Winners (1) 1917–18

=== International ===
Catalonia

- Prince of Asturias Cup:
  - Runner-up (1): 1915
