= Percy Wallace =

Spanish footballer (1890–1949)

Personal information
- Full name: Percival Francis Wallace Midgley
- Date of birth: 1890
- Place of birth: Saffron Walden, England
- Date of death: 17 November 1949 (aged 63–64)
- Place of death: Barcelona, Spain
- Position: Forward

Senior career*
Years	Team	Apps	(Gls)
1910–1911	FC Barcelona		
1911–1912	RCD Espanyol		
1912–1913	Casual SC		
1913–1915	FC Barcelona		
1915–1916	RCD Espanyol		
- * Club domestic league appearances and goals

Percival Francis Wallace Midgley (1890 – 17 November 1949) was an English footballer who played as a forward for Spanish club FC Barcelona. His older brother, Charles, also played for Barcelona.

== Club career ==
Born in Saffron Walden, his family moved to Barcelona when he was still a child. In 1910 he joined FC Barcelona, where his brother Charles also played, and despite playing for the club for just over a year (1910–11), Percival managed to win the three main titles at stake: Catalan championship (1910–11), Copa del Rey (1910) and the Pyrenees Cup (1911). He played alongside his brother in the 1910 Copa del Rey Final (FEF), an 3–2 comeback win over Español de Madrid, and again in the 1911 Pyrenees Cup Final, in which they proved decisive with three goals ("Percy" netted two) in a 4–2 win over Stade Bordelais.

In 1911 some Barcelona players left the club due to financial differences, and "Percy" was one of them, signing for RCD Espanyol together with his brother. Shortly before the end of the year, both joined Casual SC, together with other Barcelona dissidents such as José Quirante and the Comamala brothers (Carles and Arsenio). In 1913 Casual folded due to financial reasons and the Wallace brothers returned to FC Barcelona, for whom Charles played until 1915, when he decided to join RCD Espanyol again before retiring in 1916.

== Honours ==
=== Club ===
FC Barcelona

- Catalan championship:
  - Champions (1): 1910–11
- Pyrenees Cup:
  - Champions (1): 1911
- Copa del Rey:
  - Champions (1): 1910

RCD Espanyol

- Catalan championship:
  - Champions (1): 1911–12
