= Ondarreta Stadium =

Football stadium in San Sebastián (1906–13)

- Location: San Sebastián, Spain
- Capacity: 2.000

Construction
- Opened: 1906
- Closed: 1913

Tenants
- San Sebastián Recreation Club (1906–1908); Vasconia SC (1909); Real Sociedad (1909–1913)

Ondarreta Stadium was a football stadium in San Sebastián, Spain. It was the home ground of Real Sociedad from 1909 to 1913 when it was replaced by Atotxa Stadium. The stadium was opened in 1906, as part of the San Sebastián Recreation Club.

Ondarreta hosted the 1910 UECF Copa del Rey Final between Athletic Club and Vasconia SC, which ended in a to the team from Bilbao, courtesy of a goal from Remigio Iza.
