= Remigio Iza =

Spanish footballer (1883–1960)

Personal information
- Full name: Remigio Iza Urcullu
- Date of birth: 20 January 1883
- Place of birth: Gallarta, Spain
- Date of death: 4 May 1960 (aged 77)
- Position: Forward

Senior career*
Years	Team	Apps	(Gls)
1908–1912	Athletic Bilbao		
- * Club domestic league appearances and goals

Remigio Iza Urcullu (20 January 1883 – 4 May 1960) was a Spanish footballer who played as a forward for Athletic Club. The highlight of his career was scoring the winning goal of the 1910 UECF Copa del Rey Final against Vasconia.

== Biography ==
Together with José María Belauste, Luis Hurtado and Andrew Veitch, Iza was part of the great Athletic side that won back-to-back Copa del Rey titles in 1910 and 1911, in which he contributed with the winning goal of the 1910 final in a 1–0 win over Vasconia. He also featured in the 1911 Copa del Rey Final in a convincing 3–1 win over RCD Espanyol.

== Honours ==
Athletic Bilbao

Copa del Rey:

- Champions (2): 1910 and 1911
