= Romà Forns =

Spanish/Catalan footballer and manager

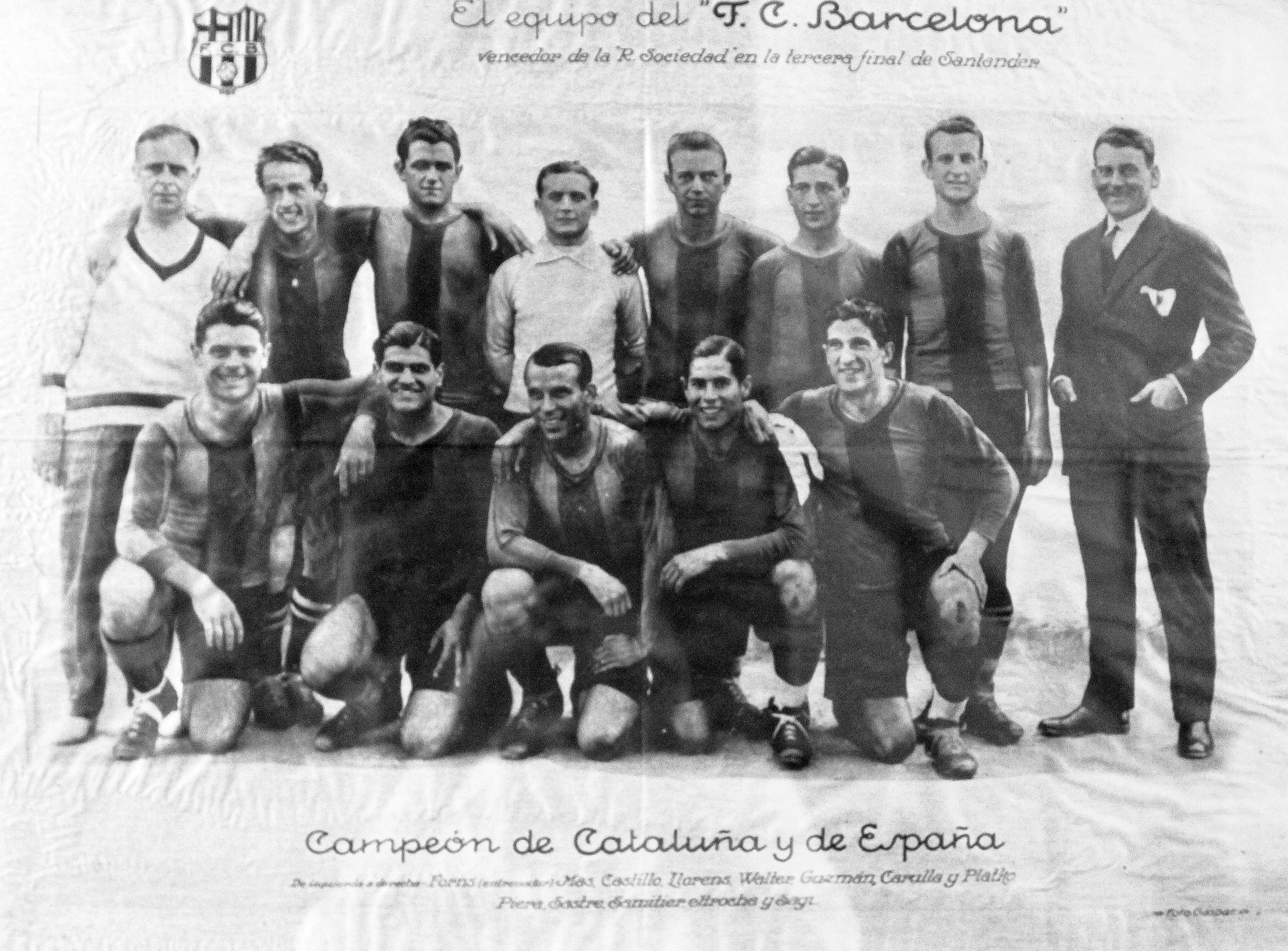

Personal information
- Full name: Romà Forns Saldaña
- Place of birth: Catalonia, Spain
- Date of death: 26 April 1942 (aged 55–56)
- Place of death: Barcelona, Spain
- Position: Forward

Senior career*
Years	Team	Apps	(Gls)
1902–1903	Irish FC		
1903–1913	Barcelona	9	(2+)

International career
1910–1912	Catalan XI	4	

Managerial career
- 1926–1929: Barcelona
- * Club domestic league appearances and goals

Romà Forns Saldaña (died 26 April 1942) was a Spanish footballer and manager. He made his debut as a footballer in late 1902 playing one season for Irish FC but spent the rest of his career with FC Barcelona and the Catalan XI, always as a forward. He later served on the Barcelona board of directors and then coached the club between 1927 and 1929, guiding it to the first ever La Liga championship. He was the first manager from either Spain or Catalonia to take charge of the club.

During his playing career, Forns helped Barcelona win the Championat de Catalunya on five occasions and the Copa del Rey once. Among his teammates at the club were Ernest Witty, Francisco Bru, Paulino Alcántara and Jack Greenwell. Between 1910 and 1912 Forns also played at least four times for the Catalan XI; however, records from the era do not always include accurate statistics and he may have played more games. On 12 December 1912 he played against France in the Catalan XI's first game against an international team. After serving on the FC Barcelona board of directors, Forns was appointed club coach in 1927 and with a team that included Josep Samitier, Sagibarba and Franz Platko he won a Catalan championship and a Copa del Rey before winning La Liga in 1929, its first edition.

Forns died in Barcelona at age 56.

== Honours ==
=== Player ===
FC Barcelona

- Copa del Rey: 1910, 1912, 1913
- Catalan Champions: 1904–05, 1908–09, 1909–10, 1910–11, 1912–13

=== Manager ===
FC Barcelona

- Spanish Champions: 1928–29
- Copa del Rey: 1928
- Catalan Champions: 1927–28
