= Carles Comamala =

Spanish footballer and orthopedic surgeon

- Comamala in 1910

Personal information
- Full name: Carles Comamala López-Del Pan
- Date of birth: 17 April 1889
- Place of birth: Madrid, Spain
- Date of death: 4 August 1983 (aged 94)
- Place of death: Barcelona, Spain
- Position: Striker

Senior career*
Years	Team	Apps	(Gls)
1901–1903	Irish FC		
1903–1911	Barcelona	154	(172)
1907–1908	→ AC Galeno (on loan)		
1911–1912	Universitary SC		
1912	RCD Espanyol		
1912–1913	FC Casual		

International career
1910–1912	Catalonia	5	(2)
- * Club domestic league appearances and goals

Carles Comamala López-Del Pan (17 April 1889 – 4 August 1983) was an orthopedic surgeon by profession and a football player for Barcelona between 1903 and 1911. He was a director of Barcelona in 1909–1911.

== Early life and career ==
Born in Madrid, the capital of Spain, to a Basque father and a Canarian mother.

In 1903, he joined Barcelona, when his friend Joan Gamper, president of FC Barcelona who had founded the club in 1899, retired. Comamala was a great striker who stood out for his side, scoring throughout his long career. He scored a total of 172 goals in 154 games for the club.

He had a very active life and also founded the Irish football team, the Galen and the University. He also played for FC Casual. He practised rugby and swimming, made occasional journalistic writings and became founder and first President of the Catalan Federation of Gymnastics, the forerunner of the Catalan Federation of Gymnastics, in 1923.

Comamala played several matches for the Catalan national team between 1910 and 1912, scoring two goals, the first of which came in Catalonia's first-ever international game on 24 July 1910 (although not recognized by FIFA), a 1-3 loss to a Paris XI.

Carlos Comamala was considered a great cartoonist; he was the creator of the original idea for the current coat of arms of FC Barcelona, then won the public tender for Barça in 1910 to better design their shield.

== Personal life ==
His brothers Arseni and Áureo were also footballers, who both also played for Barcelona. He was also the designer of the FC Barcelona club crest when he won a public competition held in 1910.

== Honors ==
- Spanish Championships: 1909–10
- Catalan Championships: 1904–05, 1908–09, 1909–10 and 1910–11
- Pyrenees Cup: 1901–10 and 1910–11
