= 1912–13 FC Barcelona season =

14th season in existence of FC Barcelona

FC Barcelona
1912–13 season
- President: Joan Gamper
- Manager: Miles Barron (until December); Jack Alderson (until January); Jack Greenwell
- Campionat de Catalunya (FAC): First
- Campionat d'Espanya (UECF): Champion
- Pyrenees Cup: Winner

The 1912–13 season was the 14th season for FC Barcelona.

== Summary ==
This season was one of the most successful in the club's history, as Barcelona clinched its second treble after winning the Catalan championship, Copa del Rey and Pyrenees Cup). However, the former two were organized by Barcelona themselves as a rival competition to those organized by the Spanish FA, even though they are considered official too, it still stains this treble as a lesser achievement than the previous one in the 1909–10. Furthermore, Barça was actually knocked out from the 1913 Pyrenees Cup after a 1–3 loss to RCD Espanyol in the semi-finals, but they managed to have the result annulled through protests, and then in the final they comfortably won 7–2, with braces from José Berdié and Paulino Alcántara. Meanwhile, in the 1913 UECF Copa del Rey Final, Barcelona needed three games to beat Real Sociedad as both legs ended with a draw (2–2 and 0–0), and then beat 2–1 in the play-off with goals from Berdié and new-signing Apolinario Rodríguez. This season also saw one of the best players of the club join: Paulino Alcántara, the youngest player (15 years old) to have made his debut with the first team.

== Squad ==
Note: Flags indicate national team as defined under FIFA eligibility rules; some limited exceptions apply. Players may hold more than one non-FIFA nationality.

No.	Pos.	Nation	Player
83	GK	ESP	Luis Renyé
95	GK	ESP	Lisard Peris
99	GK	ESP	Francisco Aramburo
67	DF	ESP	José Irízar
77	DF	PHI	Manuel Amechazurra
88	DF	ESP	Pere Molins
88	DF	ESP	José Berrondo
98	MF	GER	Walter Rositzky
55	MF	ESP	Alfredo Massana
80	MF	ESP	Manuel Castejón
62	MF	ESP	Josep Costa
87	MF	ENG	Jack Greenwell

No.	Pos.	Nation	Player
—	MF	ARG	Mariano Bori
—	MF	ESP	Manuel Lemmel
—	FW	ESP	Romà Forns
—	FW	ENG	Apolinario Rodríguez
—	FW	ESP	Enrique Peris
—	FW	ENG	Frank Allack
—	FW	ESP	José Berdié
—	FW	ESP	Alexander Steel
—	FW	SUI	Joan Gamper
—	FW	PHI	Paulino Alcántara

== Results ==
Friendlies

14 August 1912	CE Sabadell FC	2 - 8	FC Barcelona	Sabadell
			A.Massana; Steel; Forns; Alcántara	Referee: Torres Ullastres

15 August 1912	CF Badalona	2 - 7	FC Barcelona	Badalona

30 August 1912	Universitary SC	5 - 2	FC Barcelona	Manresa

29 September 1912	FC Barcelona	4 - 2	FC Espanya	Tarragona
	A.Massana; Steel; Peris; Apolinario			Stadium: Velodrom; Referee: Soler

6 October 1912	FC Barcelona	3 - 3	FC Espanya	Barcelona
	Steel; Apolinario			Stadium: Sarria; Referee: Beltran

13 October 1912	FC Barcelona	3 - 0	FC Espanya	Barcelona
	Steel; Forns; Allack			Stadium: Camp de la Indústria; Referee: Alemany

20 October 1912	FC Barcelona	5 - 2	Universitary SC	Barcelona
	Allack; Steel; A.Massana; Apolinario			Stadium: Camp de la Indústria; Referee: Allack

1 November 1912	FC Barcelona	4 - 1	Real Sociedad de Fútbol	Barcelona
	Allack; Steel; Apolinario			Stadium: Camp de la Indústria; Referee: John Hamilton

3 November 1912	FC Barcelona	4 - 0	Real Sociedad	Barcelona
	Forns; Steel; Apolinario			Stadium: Camp de la Indústria; Referee: Varela

10 November 1912	FC Barcelona	3 - 1	Casual SC	Barcelona
	Allack; Steel			Stadium: Camp de la Indústria; Referee: John Hamilton

17 November 1912	FC Barcelona	3 - 0	Reial Polo Jockey Club	Barcelona
	Apolinario; Forns own goal			Stadium: Camp de la Indústria; Referee: Rodriguez

24 November 1912	FC Català	2 - 12	FC Barcelona	Barcelona
			Steel; Alcántara; Forns; Apolinario	Stadium: Catala; Referee: Barren

1 December 1912	FC Barcelona	4 - 1	FC Català	Barcelona
	Forns; Allack; Alcántara			Stadium: Camp de la Indústria; Referee: Barren

15 December 1912	FC Barcelona	7 - 2	Hispania Valencia	Barcelona
	Steel; Allack; Apolinario; Rositzky			Stadium: Camp de la Indústria; Referee: Lorca

16 December 1912	FC Barcelona	9 - 0	Hispania Valencia	Barcelona
	Steel; Amechazurra; Costa; Greenwell			Stadium: Camp de la Indústria; Referee: Zamorano

25 December 1912	FC Barcelona	3 - 3	West Auckland Wanderers	Barcelona
	Steel; Apolinario; Allack			Stadium: Camp de la Indústria; Referee: John Hamilton

26 December 1912	FC Barcelona	0 - 4	West Auckland Wanderers	Barcelona
				Stadium: Camp de la Indústria; Referee: Glauck

29 December 1912	FC Barcelona	2 - 0	West Auckland Wanderers	Barcelona
	Steel			Stadium: Camp de la Indústria; Referee: John Hamilton

5 January 1913	FC Barcelona	0 - 3	Seleccio Guipuzcoana	Barcelona
				Stadium: Camp de la Indústria; Referee: Mensa

6 January 1913	FC Barcelona	2 - 1	Seleccio Guipuzcoana	Barcelona
	Steel; Allack			Stadium: Camp de la Indústria; Referee: John Hamilton

20 April 1913	FC Barcelona	2 - 4	Crook Town A.F.C.	Barcelona
	Smith			Stadium: Camp de la Indústria; Referee: John Hamilton

24 April 1913	FC Barcelona	1 - 1	Crook Town A.F.C.	Barcelona
	Alcántara			Stadium: Camp de la Indústria; Referee: Torres Ullastres

27 April 1913	FC Barcelona	2 - 2	Crook Town A.F.C.	Barcelona
	Apolinario; Peris			Stadium: Camp de la Indústria; Referee: John Hamilton

1 May 1913	FC Barcelona	7 - 2	Seleccio Llevantina	Barcelona
	Alcántara; Martinez own goal			Stadium: Camp de la Indústria; Referee: Sabaris

1 May 1913	Deportivo Bilbao	1 - 4	FC Barcelona	Bilbao
				Stadium: Deportivo

4 May 1913	FC Barcelona	1 - 0	Seleccio Llevantina	Barcelona
	Llongas			Stadium: Camp de la Indústria; Referee: Sabaris

11 May 1913	FC Barcelona	2 - 2	Fussballclub Zürich	Barcelona
	Apolinario; Allack			Stadium: Camp de la Indústria; Referee: John Hamilton

12 May 1913	FC Barcelona	2 - 2	Fussballclub Zürich	Barcelona
	Apolinario; Peris			Stadium: Camp de la Indústria; Referee: John Hamilton

19 May 1913	FC Barcelona	0 - 5	Daring Brussel LES	Barcelona
				Stadium: Camp de la Indústria; Referee: Mensa

20 May 1913	FC Barcelona	1 - 3	Daring Brusselles	Barcelona
	Steel			Stadium: Camp de la Indústria; Referee: John Hamilton

24 June 1913	FC Barcelona	3 - 1	CF Badalona	Barcelona
	Allack; Apolinario			Stadium: Camp de la Indústria; Referee: Torres Ullastres

24 June 1913	Palamós CF	2 - 5	FC Barcelona	Palamós

25 June 1913	Palamós CF	1 - 5	FC Barcelona	Palamós

Copa Espanya (RUEC)

1 June 1913	FC Barcelona	5 - 1	FC Català	Barcelona
	Berdié; Oller; Alcántara			Stadium: Camp de la Indústria; Referee: Torres Ullastres

15 June 1913	FC Català	1 - 11	FC Barcelona	Barcelona
			A.Massana; Alcántara; Forns; Berdié; Apolinario	Stadium: Catala; Referee: John Hamilton

Campionat de Catalunya (FAC)

26 January 1913 Match 1	FC Barcelona	10 - 1	Català SC	Barcelona
	Apolinario; Berdié; Oller; A.Massana		Sabater	Referee: Torres Ullastres

9 February 1913 Match 2	FC Barcelona	6 - 2	FC Badalona	Barcelona
	Berdié; Apolinario; A.Massana		Goal	Stadium: Camp de la Indústria; Referee: Amechazurra

16 February 1913 Match 3	FC Barcelona	4 - 5	FC Barcelona "B"	Barcelona
15:30	Goal		Goal	Stadium: Camp de la Indústria; Referee: José Berdié

23 February 1913 Match 4	FC Barcelona	6 - 3	FC Barcelona "C"	Barcelona
	Gamper; Oller; Apolinario; A.Massana		Costa	Stadium: Camp de la Indústria; Referee: Enrique Peris

- On day 2, the match was played against Avenç, suspended for climatological reasons at 20 minutes when the score was 0-0.
- The championship did not end and Barcelona was awarded as the winner.

Campionat d'Espanya (RUEC)

16 March 1913 First leg	FC Barcelona	2 - 2	Real Sociedad de Fútbol	Barcelona
	Forns; Apolinario		Arrillaga; Artola 89'	Stadium: Camp de la Indústria; Referee: Angoso

17 March 1913 Second leg	FC Barcelona	0 - 0	Real Sociedad de Fútbol	Barcelona
				Stadium: Camp de la Indústria; Referee: Angoso

23 March 1913 Play-off	FC Barcelona	2 - 1	Real Sociedad de Fútbol	Barcelona
	Berdié; Apolinario		Rezola	Stadium: Camp de la Indústria; Referee: Angoso

Copa dels Pirineus

30 March 1913 Quarterfinals	FC Barcelona	7 - 0	Casual SC	Barcelona
	Steel; Allack; Apolinario			Stadium: Camp de la Indústria; Referee: Nandy

6 April 1913 Semifinals	FC Barcelona	1 - 3	RCD Espanyol	Barcelona
15:55	Greenwell		Darley; Amechazurra (o.g.); Antonio Morales	Stadium: Camp de la Indústria; Referee: Nandy

8 June 1913 Final	FC Barcelona	7 - 2	Cométe et Simot	Barcelona
16:30	Berdié 10'; Alcántara; Forns; Allack; Massana		Sandoval; José Berrondo (o.g.)	Stadium: Camp de la Indústria; Referee: Nandy
