= José Berraondo =

Spanish footballer & manager (1878–1950)

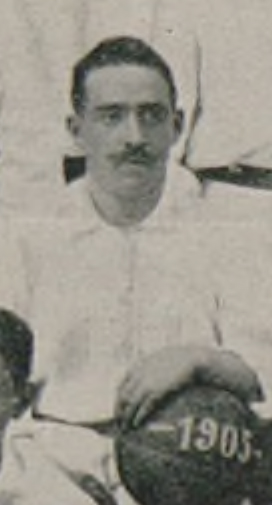

Personal information
- Full name: José Ángel Berraondo Insausti
- Date of birth: 4 November 1878
- Place of birth: San Sebastián, Gipuzkoa, Spain
- Date of death: 11 April 1950 (aged 71)
- Place of death: San Sebastián, Spain
- Position: Defender

Senior career*
Years	Team	Apps	(Gls)
- Brentford
1904–1909	Madrid FC		
1909–1913	Real Sociedad		

Managerial career
- 1913: Spain (unofficial)
- 1916–1923: Real Sociedad
- 1921: Spain
- 1927–1929: Real Madrid
- 1928: Spain
- * Club domestic league appearances and goals

José Angel Berraondo Insausti (4 November 1878 – 11 April 1950) was a Spanish footballer, referee and manager. He was one of the most important figures of Spain's football at the beginning and middle of the 20th century, as a player, captain, club founder, manager, referee, director, vice-president and even as a national coach.

Berraondo was one of the most important figures in the amateur beginnings of Real Madrid, then known as Madrid CF, serving as its captain from 1904 until 1909, and thus playing a crucial role in Madrid's four consecutive Copa del Rey titles between 1905 and 1908. In addition to being the team captain, he was also the vice-president of Los Merengues, even holding the interim presidency of Madrid FC for a few months. Berraondo was one of the founding members of Real Sociedad in 1909, and helped the newly founded club reach two Copa del Rey finals in 1910 and 1913. After retiring as a player, Berraondo became a referee and took charge of the 1921 Copa del Rey Final. As a manager, he guided the Spain national team at the 1928 Summer Olympics, and coached Real Madrid for 2 years during 1927–1929.

== Playing career ==
Berraondo was introduced to football during his time as a student in England. Apparently, he got to play in the first team of Brentford during this period. At the age of 26, Berraondo returned to Spain and settled in Madrid, where he decided to continue his love of football and joined the city's main club, Madrid FC (now Real Madrid), in 1904. Despite the presence of the likes of Yarza, Prast, Parages and even Armando Giralt, it was Berraondo who, just one year after joining the team, became the captain of Madrid FC in 1905. No one disputed this decision in a time when the captain had the duty of dictating the tactics to be followed and making up the line-ups as there were still no professional coaches in Spain's football, thus basically serving as a player-coach. Under his captaincy, Madrid won 4 Copa del Rey titles in a row between 1905 and 1908 and as many regional championships with the white club. Berraondo played an important role in the first great team in the history of Real Madrid since he was able to pass on to his teammates the knowledge that he had acquired in England about football.

In 1909 he decided to go live in his hometown, whose local team at the time was Club Ciclista de San Sebastián, which had just won the 1909 Copa del Rey, being the first time in 5 years that a team other than Madrid won the competition. A few months after this victory, Berraondo, along with the players who had won the tournament, founded the Sociedad de Football (now known as Real Sociedad) on 7 September 1909, of which he was elected its first vice-president.

Berraondo played for Real Sociedad for four years, between 1909 and 1913, a period in which he also served as captain and player-coach, using the knowledge he brought from England to strengthen the newly founded team. Sociedad participated in the 1910 Copa del Rey (UECF) under the umbrella of another local club, the Vasconia Sporting Club (since the club was not a year old since its constitution like the tournament statutes required). To secure a spot, however, Vasconia had first to defeat Racing Club de Irún in a playoff to determine the local representative in the tournament, and Berraondo played in both matches, which ended in wins. The tournament was played in a triangle format against the only two other teams who had won the competition, Madrid FC and Athletic Club, the powerhouses of Spain's football at the time, but under Berraondo's leadership, they managed to beat his former club Madrid by a score of 2–0 (both goals being scored by George McGuinness), but in the final they were beaten by Athletic 0–1, the courtesy of a goal from Remigio Iza.

In 1913, in another edition marked by two parallel tournaments, Sociedad also played in one of the two Cup finals, this time against FC Barcelona. Berraondo played the first two games of the final teaming up in defense with Mariano Arrate, with both ending in draws, first at 2 and then at 0. In the third and decisive match, Berraondo was replaced by Eguía and without him, Barcelona took the title with a 2–1 win. On 5 October 1913, Berraondo participated in another historic eleven of Real Sociedad, the one that opened the Atotxa Stadium against Athletic Club, in an eventual 3–3 draw. That same year Berraondo, who was already a veteran turning 35, decided to hang up his boots as a footballer.

Berraondo is sometimes confused with fellow football player José Berrondo, who was 12 years his junior and who played with FC Barcelona in the 1912–13 season, which led to many news outlets to wrongly claim that Berraondo had been one of the first players to play for both Madrid FC and FC Barcelona, and the last one to do so before the outbreak of the First World War.

== Executive career ==
While at Madrid FC, he held a position on the board during the presidency of General Adolfo Meléndez (1908–10). Despite still being a player and captain of the squad he was elected vice president. In fact, in the absence of Meléndez, who was a professional soldier and had to go to the Melilla War, Berraondo held the interim presidency of Madrid FC for a few months. His departure in 1909 to live in San Sebastián forced him to resign from these functions and he was subsequently relieved of the vice-presidency of the club, a position that he carried out with great honor. Also in 1909, he participated in the foundation of Real Sociedad, of which he was a member of the first board of directors, also holding the position of vice president for a few years, while also serving as player and captain of the team.

Berraondo also took part in the founding of the Spanish Football Federation in 1913 and the Guipuzcoan Football Federation and held various positions in the organization chart of these federations. He was proposed for President of the Guipuzcoan Football Federation in 1923, but did not accept the position.

== Refereeing career ==
Berraondo was still an active player when he refereed his first match, a preliminary round in the 1911 Copa del Rey between Bilbao FC and Academia de Artillería. He had to wait five years to oversee another competitive match, but the wait was worth it because this time it was a much more important match, both literally and historically: The semifinals of the 1916 Copa del Rey between Madrid CF and FC Barcelona, the first-ever El Clásico in the competition's history.

After both teams won their respective home leg, Berraondo was selected as the referee of the replay match, in which Berraondo made several highly controversial decisions in favour of his former club, such as disallowing a goal from Barça scored by Paulino Alcántara and giving three penalties to Madrid, the first two were saved by Barça's goalkeeper Luis Bru, but the third, the only one that was not discussed, was converted by Santiago Bernabéu in the 118th minute to seal a thrilling 6–6 draw, thus forcing another replay, which was also refereed by Berraondo, who again made several questionable decisions, such as giving yet another last-minute penalty with the score tied at 2, but Bru saved that one as well to force extra-time, in which Sotero Aranguren scored twice, although the Barcelona players protested that the Madrid attackers had grabbed Bru in the second goal, but Berraondo ignored and Barcelona withdrew in protest. At the end of the match, the public strongly protested Berraondo's performance, and in the 1916 final between Madrid and Athletic Bilbao, which was played in Barcelona, some banners in the stands even asked for Berraondo's head.

Berraondo also refereed the 1921 Copa del Rey Final between Athletic Club and Athletic Madrid, which was the first meeting between the 'two Athletics' who had begun as the same club, ending in a convincing 4–1 win to the team from Bilbao.

== Sports journalist career ==
Berraondo also devoted himself professionally to sports journalism as a sports editor of El País Vasco and editor of the newspaper La Noticia. While still at Madrid FC, in the "Heraldo de Madrid", Berraondo published some delicious chronicles about the qualities, training, defects and virtues of each of the players' positions. Ways to defend a corner, speed tests and specific training for goalkeepers.

== Managerial career ==
=== Real Sociedad ===
Berraondo was the first coach in the history of Real Sociedad. According to the Real Sociedad website, Berraondo served as coach of Real Sociedad between 1909 and the 1922–23 season, when they signed the first professional coach in their history, the Hungarian Lippo Hertzka. This claim comes from the fact that Berraondo was the captain of Real Sociedad from 1909, when he arrived at the San Sebastian team, until his retirement in 1913, and after his retirement as a footballer, it seems that Berraondo continued to be linked to Sociedad as a coach, because in a press release from 1917, is commented that "Berraondo presents his resignation as coach of the team", his resignation not being accepted by the board. So although this figure lacked official status at the time, it can be said that he performed these functions both as captain and after.

=== Spain ===
Berraondo was the driving force behind Spain's first-ever unofficial international match held on 25 May 1913 at Estadio de Amute in Hondarribia, performing the functions of Spain's coach and even refereeing the match himself. The line-up he selected was made up mainly of players from Real Sociedad (5 out of 11). On that day, Spain, playing under the auspices of the Real Unión Española de Clubs de Football (RUECF), went against France national side represented by the USFSA, and the game ended in a 1–1 draw thanks to a late equalizer from Juan Arzuaga.

In July 1920 Berraondo was appointed coach of the Spain national team, which was going to make its international debut at the 1920 Summer Olympics. However, despite being a member of the squad that went to Antwerp together with Paco Bru and Julián Ruete, it was Bru who managed Spain's team on Belgian lands, thus going down in history as the first coach of Spain's national team.

A year later, a Selection Committee that was to be in charge of Spain's team was formed, a triumvirate made up of Berraondo himself, Ruete and the Galician Manuel Castro (who had been the driving force behind the founding of Celta de Vigo), and the first match this Committee oversaw was a friendly against Belgium 9 October 1921, which was Spain's first-ever game after the Olympics as well as their first-ever game on home soil. After the match, which Spain won (2–0), the triumvirate was dissolved after Berraondo resigned on the eve of Spain's second match as a local on 18 December 1921 against Portugal. His resignation was due to his refusal to accept pressure to field certain players.

However, Berraondo's link with Spain's team did not end there. After the failure of Spain in the 1924 Paris Olympics, Berraondo was finally appointed as coach. However, Berraondo did not accept the position because of his job as sports editor of the newspaper El País Vasco in San Sebastián. In any case, he left the door open for a future acceptance of the position as long as it was for an exceptional and punctual event, such as an Olympics.

=== 1928 Olympics ===
In July 1927, he was appointed once again as the national coach, and this time Berraondo decided to accept, to start the preparations for the upcoming 1928 Summer Olympics. Almost simultaneously, however, he also receives an offer to coach Real Madrid, and he accepts both positions, which he carried out during the 1927-28 season. With Spain, Berraondo faced the harsh reality of not being able to carry out his regular training plan due to the lack of free dates. He was only able to lead the national team in two friendlies during the first half of 1928, against Portugal and Italy, which ended in draws, with the draw against Portugal provoking harsh attacks from his critics. Dissatisfied with the means available to him, he submitted his resignation shortly before the 1928 Olympics, but this resignation was not accepted. Being the Olympic Games an amateur competition, professionals had no place, and his deep convictions of fair play led him to lead a strictly amateur team, which did not have the so-called brown amateurs, players who are legally amateurs, but professionals in practice. Meanwhile, the other national teams fielded the best players they had, even if they were undercover professionals. This fact led to the absence of the main figures of Spain's football at the time, such as the goalkeeper Ricardo Zamora, José Samitier or Vicente Piera. Berraondo's Olympic team, which was mostly made up of Real Sociedad players, started the tournament brightly defeating Mexico by a score of 7–1, and in the second game, against Italy, Spain surprisingly tied at 1; but in the replay 3 days later, Italy kicked them out of the tournament with a resounding 7–1 win. It was a new failure of Spain in the Olympics and the criticism of Berraondo fell mercilessly, especially for his decision to field the Arenas goalkeeper José María Jáuregui instead of Ricardo "Divino" Zamora, whom many called inexperienced and blamed for much of the defeat. In Berraondo's defense, it can be said that the Italians benefited from an arbitration unanimously described as disastrous. After the fiasco of the Olympiad Berraondo resigned from his position as coach.

=== Real Madrid ===
On the other hand, his career at the helm of Real Madrid that season was not too brilliant either. The team came second in the 1927–28 Centro championship, losing to their eternal rival, Athletic Madrid, and in the 1928 Copa del Rey, they fell in the quarterfinals to Valencia CF, a team that who was not yet considered one of the important teams of Spain's football. On 3 October 1928, he resigned from his position as coach of Real Madrid citing health reasons and announced his return to Gipuzkoa.

After the bitter draft of the 1927–28 season, Berraondo left the world of football, not appearing in the sports news for the following years.

== Honours ==
Madrid FC

- Centro championship:
  - Champions (4): 1905, 1906, 1906–07, (Note: In the 1906–07 season, Madrid FC won the tournament, but the Madrid Football Federation annulled the results.) 1907–08
- Copa del Rey:
  - Champions (4): 1905, 1906, 1907, 1908

Real Sociedad

- Copa del Rey:
  - Champions (2): 1910, (Note: as Vasconia.) 1913
