= Romà Solà =

Spanish footballer (1886–1927)

Personal information
- Full name: Romà Solà Brunet
- Birth name: Romà Solà i Brunet
- Date of birth: 27 November 1886
- Place of birth: Barcelona, Spain
- Date of death: 1 March 1927 (aged 40)
- Place of death: Barcelona, Spain
- Position: Goalkeeper

Senior career*
Years	Team	Apps	(Gls)
1904–1905	Espanyol		
1905–1912	FC Barcelona		
1912–1913	Casual		

International career
1909	Catalonia	1	(0)
- * Club domestic league appearances and goals

Romà Solà Brunet (27 November 1886 – 1 March 1927) was a Spanish footballer who played as a goalkeeper for Espanyol and FC Barcelona.

== Club career ==
Born in Barcelona on 27 November 1886, Solà began his football career at his hometown club Espanyol in 1904, the season in which the club's goal was defended by 4 different goalkeepers without any of them showing superiority over the others, and likewise, Solà only played a single Catalan championship match for the club.

Solà joined Espanyol's rival Barcelona the following year, remaining there for seven years, from 1905 to 1912, playing a total of 35 official matches. He was an integral piece in Barcelona's first great team in the early 1910s, which had the likes of the Wallace brothers (Charles and Percy), Paco Bru, Alfredo Massana, and Manuel Amechazurra, with whom he won a three-peat of Catalan championships between 1909 and 1911, along with back-to-back Pyrenees Cups in 1910 and 1911, and the Copa del Rey in 1910 (FEF), starting in the latter final, which ended in a 3–2 win over Español de Madrid. He also started in the final of the 1910 Pyrenees Cup, which ended in a 2–1 win over Real Sociedad 2–1, thus contributing in the club's first piece of international silverware.

In October 1911, Barça president Joan Gamper expelled several "rebel" players from the club following a controversy with brown amateurism, and this group of dissident players from Barça, which was made up of the likes of Solà, Bru, José Quirante, the Wallace brothers, and the Comamala brothers (Carles and Arsenio), decided to found Casual SC in 1912.

In March 1913, Casual participated in the most important tournament of its short history, the fourth edition of the Pyrenees Cup, with Tormo starting for Casual in the quarterfinals against Barça, which ended in a humiliating 7–0 loss. When the club disappeared in June 1913, some of its players joined RCD Espanyol, but Solà retired.

== International career ==
On 18 November 1909, Solà earned his first (and only) cap for the Catalan national team in a match against Equip Blanc (White Team) at the Camp de la Indústria, on the occasion of a benefit match for the injured people in the Second Melillan campaign, starting in a 6–2 loss. On 9 February 1910, he started for Barça in a friendly against Catalonia at the Camp de la Indústria, helping his side to a 3–2 win.

== Death ==
Solà died in Barcelona on 1 March 1927, at the age of 40, and his obituary mentioned the grieving siblings, Aurelia, Amparo, Miguel and Julio, sister-in-law Dolores Meya. At the time of his death, he was the manager of Penya Rhin, a Barcelona automobile and motorcycle club.

== Honours ==
FC Barcelona

- Catalan championship: 1909–10, 1910–11, 1911–12
- Pyrenees Cup: 1910, 1911
- Copa del Rey: 1910
