= Derbi Barceloní =

Football rivalry in Barcelona, Spain

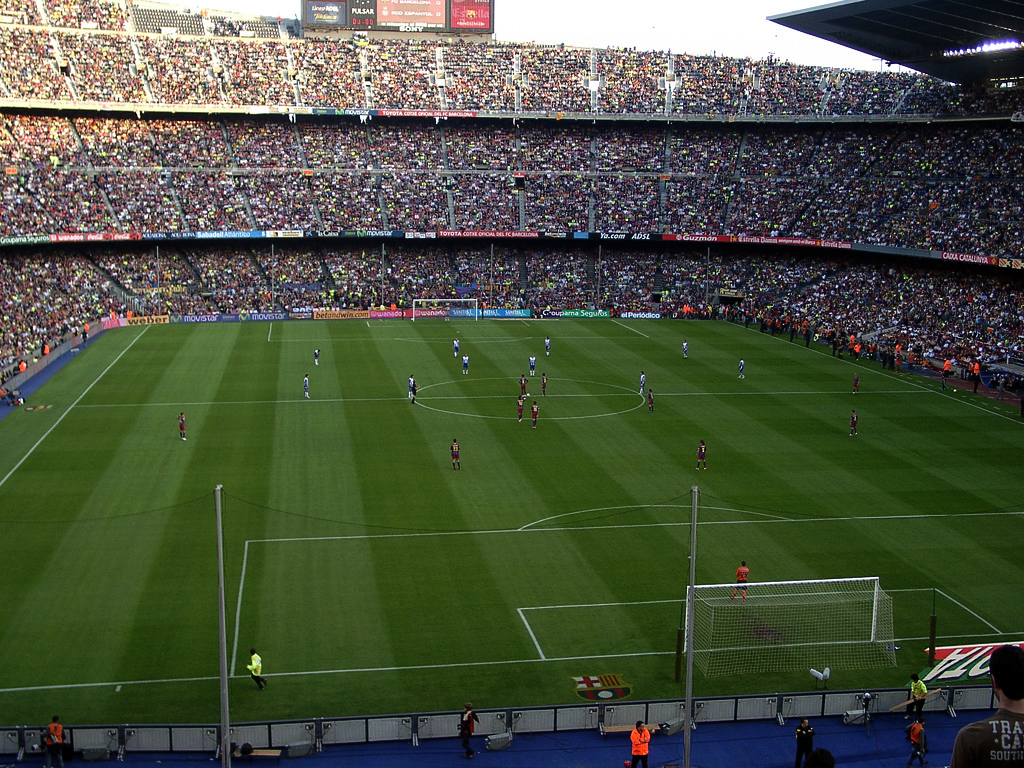
- Other names: El derbi El Derbi Barcelonés, Catalan derby
- Location: Province of Barcelona, Spain
- Teams: Barcelona; Espanyol
- First meeting: 7 April 1929; La Liga; Barcelona 1–0 Espanyol
- Latest meeting: 11 April 2026; La Liga; Barcelona 4–1 Espanyol
- Next meeting: 3 Jan 2027; La Liga; Espanyol vs. Barcelona

Statistics
- Total meetings: 220 (official)
- Most wins: Barcelona (130)
- Most player appearances: Xavi (36)
- Top scorer: Lionel Messi (25)
- Largest victory: Espanyol 6–0 Barcelona (15 April 1951)
- Location of the teams in the Province of Barcelona

The Derbi Barceloní (Catalan pronunciation: [ˈðɛɾβi βəɾsəluˈni]; Spanish: Derbi Barcelonés, IPA: [ˈðeɾβi βaɾθeloˈnes]; "Barcelonian derby") is the name given to football matches between FC Barcelona and RCD Espanyol. Both clubs are located in the Barcelona metropolitan area, Spain.

== Rivalry ==
In the first half of the 20th century during the Miguel Primo de Rivera dictatorship (1923–1930), FC Barcelona was the embodiment of the oppressed Catalan sentiment, in stark contrast to RCD Espanyol which was more aligned with the central authority.

In 1918, the municipalities of Catalonia promoted a campaign requesting the Spanish government a Statute of Autonomy. FC Barcelona joined that request and the Catalan press explained it by saying "FC Barcelona has become the club of Catalonia". The other team of the city, RCD Espanyol, were dissociated from the claim.

On numerous occasions RCD Espanyol have complained of an unfavorable treatment which is sometimes directly offensive according to them, towards the club in favor of FC Barcelona by some public media dependent on the Generalitat of Catalonia like TV3.

Despite these differences in ideology, the derbi has always been more relevant to Espanyol supporters than Barcelona ones due to the difference in objectives.

== Background and history ==
Though it is the most played local derby in the history of La Liga, it is also the most unbalanced, with Barcelona overwhelmingly dominant. In the league table, Espanyol has only managed to finish above Barça on three occasions in almost 70 years and the only all-Catalan Copa del Rey final was won by Barça in 1957. Espanyol has the consolation of achieving the largest margin win with a 6–0 in 1951.

In 1996, Barcelona came out on top when the teams were drawn together in the cup semi-finals, although they lost the final to Atlético Madrid. In 2000, the possibility of another derby final evaporated after Barcelona forfeited the second leg of their semi, coincidentally also against Atlético Madrid, in protest at fixture congestion which badly weakened their squad; Espanyol overcame both Real Madrid in their semi and Atlético in the final. The Pericos also claimed the trophy in 2006 and qualified for the 2006 Supercopa de España where they met league champions Barcelona – the Blaugrana winning 4–0 on aggregate.

On 8 June 2007, Espanyol achieved a 2–2 draw against Barça in the penultimate day of the championship, making it possible for Real Madrid to win the 2006–07 La Liga in their next match at the Bernabeu. This match is popularly remembered with the name of Tamudazo, for Raúl Tamudo, the Espanyol player who scored the goal for the draw. Espanyol achieved a 2–1 win against Barça during 2008–09, becoming the first team to defeat Barcelona at Camp Nou in their treble-winning season.

Espanyol moved to their new RCDE Stadium in 2009, but it was not until their tenth meeting with Barcelona at their new arena that they were able to win a derby fixture (three draws, six defeats), winning 1–0 in the 2017–18 Copa del Rey quarter-final, first leg on 17 January 2018. However, Barcelona overturned this 2–0 at the Camp Nou the following week to go through in the tie, the tenth time in succession (since 1961) that Barça had progressed in the domestic Cup. Three years earlier, Barcelona had also won the 2014–15 Copa del Rey by beating Athletic Bilbao, with the Basques having ended Espanyol's hopes, and the chance of a Catalan showpiece, in the semi-finals.

As of 2019, Barça's Lionel Messi who made his debut in the Derby, has scored 25 goals against Espanyol, the most in the history of the derby.

Espanyol lost 1–0 to Barcelona on 8 July 2020 to be relegated to the Segunda División for the first time since 1994.

On 14 May 2023, Barcelona won the 2022–23 La Liga title after defeating Espanyol on their home ground. During Barcelona's celebrations, the team quickly ran into the lockers after Espanyol fans invaded the pitch and disrupted Barça's celebrations. On 15 May 2025, Barcelona repeated their feat by winning the 2024–25 La Liga title, again defeating Espanyol on their home ground.

== All matches ==
As of 11 April 2026

=== Major competitions ===
Competition	Matches	Wins		Draws	Goals	
Competition	Matches	FCB	RCDE	Draws	FCB	RCDE
La Liga	180	106	34	40	351	185
Copa del Rey	36	20	10	6	69	47
Supercopa de España	2	2	0	0	4	0
Inter-Cities Fairs Cup	2	2	0	0	2	0
Total matches	220	130	44	46	426	232

=== Minor and defunct competitions ===
	Matches	Wins		Draws	Goals	
	Matches	FCB	RCDE	Draws	FCB	RCDE
Copa Macaya (Note: Played between 1900 and 1903)	3	3	0	0	15	1
Copa Barcelona (Note: Played once, 1902–03)	2	0	0	2	4	4
Catalan Championship (Note: Played between 1903 and 1940)	68	36	22	10	143	96
Pyrenees Cup (Note: Played between 1910 and 1914)	2	1	1	0	4	5
Copa Catalunya (Note: Clubs involved between 1990 and 2014)	10	3	4	3	11	16
Supercopa de Catalunya (Note: Current, played since 2014)	3	0	1	2	1	2
Total matches	88	43	28	17	178	124

== League ==
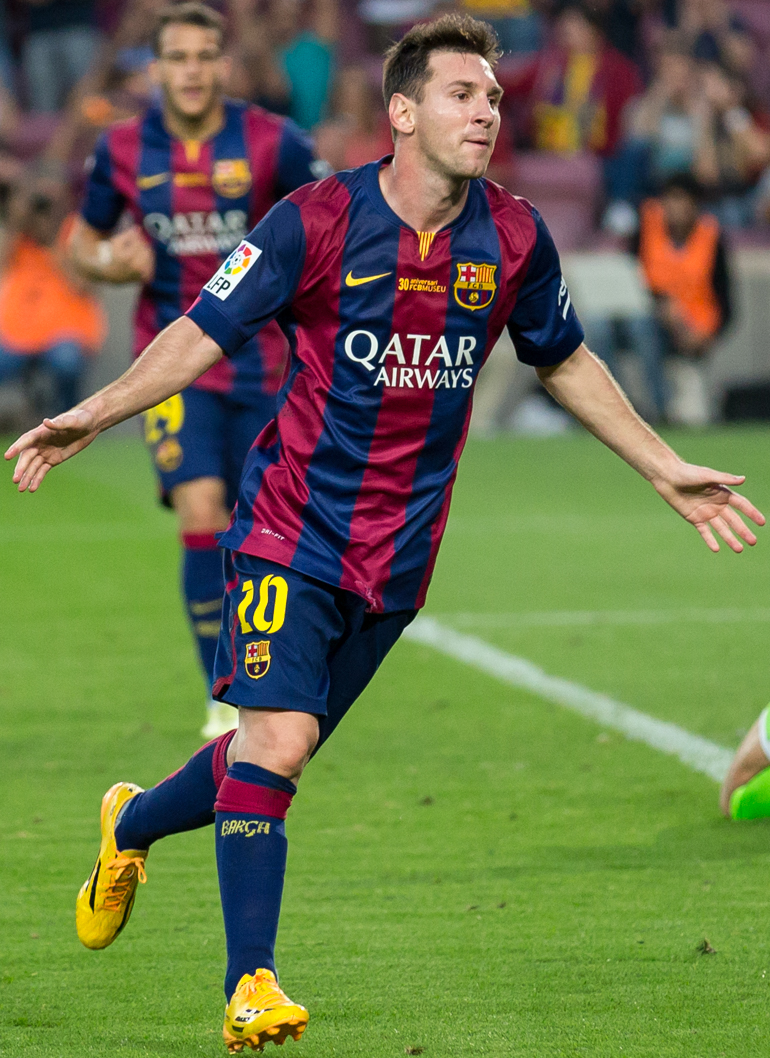
Lionel Messi is the all-time top scorer in the history of the Catalan Derby with 25 goals overall. He is also the second-highest appearance maker (behind Xavi) with 35.

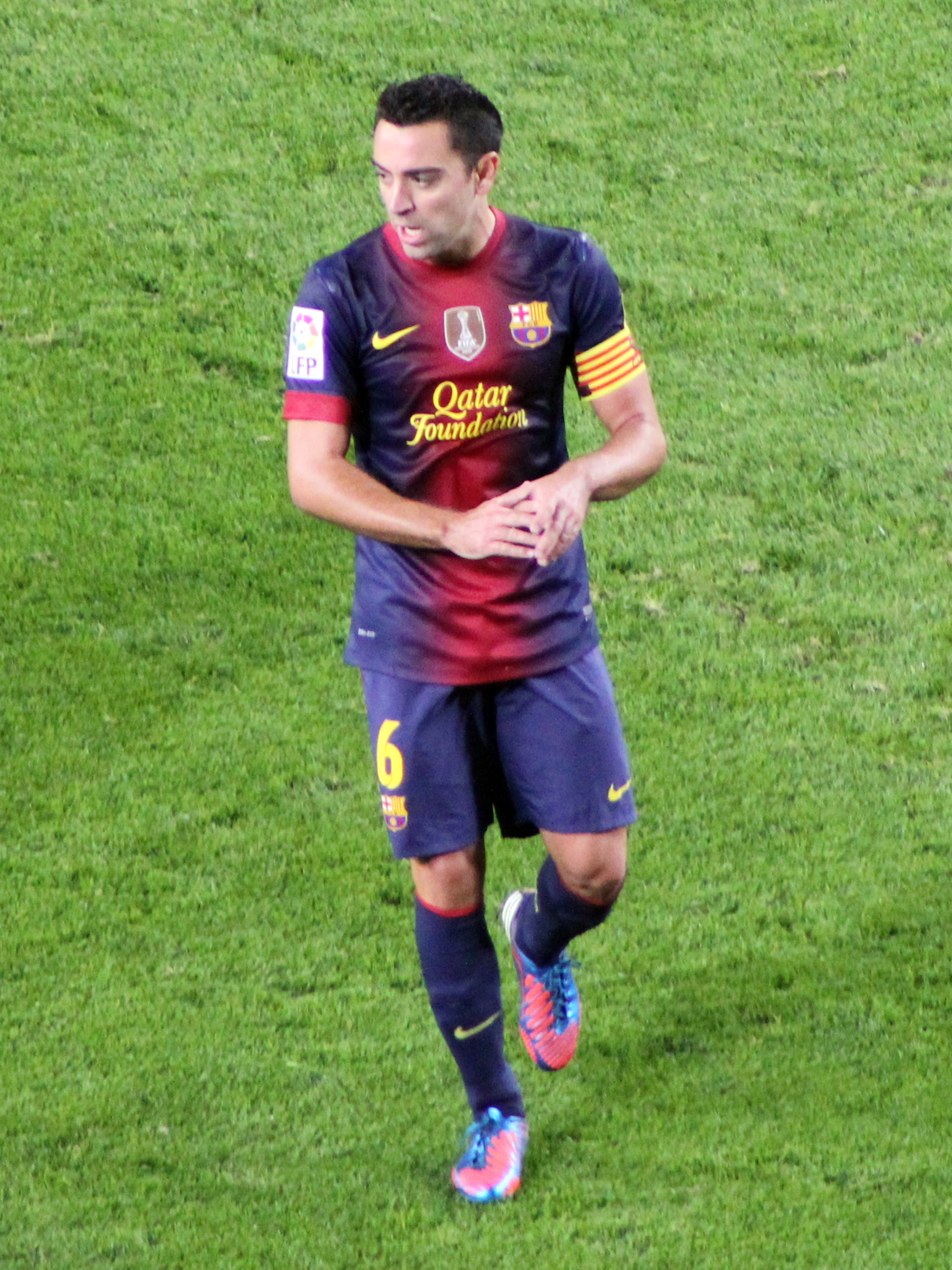
Xavi is the highest appearance maker in the history of the Barcelonian Derby with a total of 36 matches played.

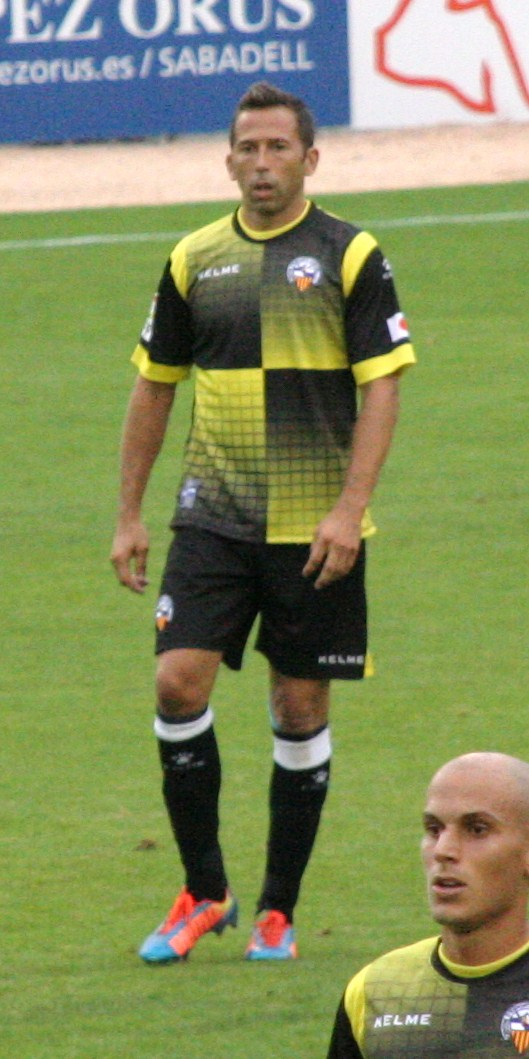
Raúl Tamudo, the originator of the famous Tamudazo

FC Barcelona vs. RCD Espanyol
Season	Home team	Score	Away team
1928–29	FC Barcelona	1–0	RCD Espanyol
1929–30	FC Barcelona	5–4	RCD Espanyol
1930–31	FC Barcelona	6–2	RCD Espanyol
1931–32	FC Barcelona	2–2	RCD Espanyol
1932–33	FC Barcelona	1–1	RCD Espanyol
1933–34	FC Barcelona	5–0	RCD Espanyol
1934–35	FC Barcelona	2–2	RCD Espanyol
1935–36	FC Barcelona	2–0	RCD Espanyol
1936–37	Spanish Civil War		
1937–38	Spanish Civil War		
1938–39	Spanish Civil War		
1939–40	FC Barcelona	0–1	RCD Espanyol
1940–41	FC Barcelona	2–3	RCD Espanyol
1941–42	FC Barcelona	1–2	RCD Espanyol
1942–43	FC Barcelona	2–0	RCD Espanyol
1943–44	FC Barcelona	1–3	RCD Espanyol
1944–45	FC Barcelona	1–0	RCD Espanyol
1945–46	FC Barcelona	1–0	RCD Espanyol
1946–47	FC Barcelona	5–0	RCD Espanyol
1947–48	FC Barcelona	5–1	RCD Espanyol
1948–49	FC Barcelona	2–1	RCD Espanyol
1949–50	FC Barcelona	1–2	RCD Espanyol
1950–51	FC Barcelona	4–1	RCD Espanyol
1951–52	FC Barcelona	2–0	RCD Espanyol
1952–53	FC Barcelona	2–1	RCD Espanyol
1953–54	FC Barcelona	1–4	RCD Espanyol
1954–55	FC Barcelona	1–0	RCD Espanyol
1955–56	FC Barcelona	1–0	RCD Espanyol
1956–57	FC Barcelona	1–1	RCD Espanyol
1957–58	FC Barcelona	3–1	RCD Espanyol
1958–59	FC Barcelona	5–3	RCD Espanyol
1959–60	FC Barcelona	1–0	RCD Espanyol
1960–61	FC Barcelona	4–1	RCD Espanyol
1961–62	FC Barcelona	2–0	RCD Espanyol
1962–63	RCD Espanyol in Spanish Second Division		
1963–64	FC Barcelona	5–0	RCD Espanyol
1964–65	FC Barcelona	1–0	RCD Espanyol
1965–66	FC Barcelona	4–2	RCD Espanyol
1966–67	FC Barcelona	3–1	RCD Espanyol
1967–68	FC Barcelona	1–0	RCD Espanyol
1968–69	FC Barcelona	1–0	RCD Espanyol
1969–70	RCD Espanyol in Spanish Second Division		
1970–71	FC Barcelona	3–0	RCD Espanyol
1971–72	FC Barcelona	2–0	RCD Espanyol
1972–73	FC Barcelona	0–1	RCD Espanyol
1973–74	FC Barcelona	3–0	RCD Espanyol
1974–75	FC Barcelona	4–1	RCD Espanyol
1975–76	FC Barcelona	5–0	RCD Espanyol
1976–77	FC Barcelona	4–2	RCD Espanyol
1977–78	FC Barcelona	1–1	RCD Espanyol
1978–79	FC Barcelona	2–1	RCD Espanyol
1979–80	FC Barcelona	3–1	RCD Espanyol
1980–81	FC Barcelona	3–1	RCD Espanyol
1981–82	FC Barcelona	1–3	RCD Espanyol
1982–83	FC Barcelona	1–0	RCD Espanyol
1983–84	FC Barcelona	5–2	RCD Espanyol
1984–85	FC Barcelona	1–0	RCD Espanyol
1985–86	FC Barcelona	0–0	RCD Espanyol
1986–87	FC Barcelona	1–0	RCD Espanyol
1986–87	FC Barcelona	2–1	RCD Espanyol
1987–88	FC Barcelona	3–2	RCD Espanyol
1988–89	FC Barcelona	2–0	RCD Espanyol
1989–90	RCD Espanyol in Spanish Second Division		
1990–91	FC Barcelona	5–2	RCD Espanyol
1991–92	FC Barcelona	4–3	RCD Espanyol
1992–93	FC Barcelona	5–0	RCD Espanyol
1993–94	RCD Espanyol in Spanish Second Division		
1994–95	FC Barcelona	3–0	RCD Espanyol
1995–96	FC Barcelona	2–1	RCD Espanyol
1996–97	FC Barcelona	2–1	RCD Espanyol
1997–98	FC Barcelona	3–1	RCD Espanyol
1998–99	FC Barcelona	3–0	RCD Espanyol
1999–2000	FC Barcelona	3–0	RCD Espanyol
2000–01	FC Barcelona	4–2	RCD Espanyol
2001–02	FC Barcelona	2–0	RCD Espanyol
2002–03	FC Barcelona	2–0	RCD Espanyol
2003–04	FC Barcelona	4–1	RCD Espanyol
2004–05	FC Barcelona	0–0	RCD Espanyol
2005–06	FC Barcelona	2–0	RCD Espanyol
2006–07	FC Barcelona	2–2	RCD Espanyol
2007–08	FC Barcelona	0–0	RCD Espanyol
2008–09	FC Barcelona	1–2	RCD Espanyol
2009–10	FC Barcelona	1–0	RCD Espanyol
2010–11	FC Barcelona	2–0	RCD Espanyol
2011–12	FC Barcelona	4–0	RCD Espanyol
2012–13	FC Barcelona	4–0	RCD Espanyol
2013–14	FC Barcelona	1–0	RCD Espanyol
2014–15	FC Barcelona	5–1	RCD Espanyol
2015–16	FC Barcelona	5–0	RCD Espanyol
2016–17	FC Barcelona	4–1	RCD Espanyol
2017–18	FC Barcelona	5–0	RCD Espanyol
2018–19	FC Barcelona	2–0	RCD Espanyol
2019–20	FC Barcelona	1–0	RCD Espanyol
2020–21	RCD Espanyol in Spanish Second Division		
2021–22	FC Barcelona	1–0	RCD Espanyol
2022–23	FC Barcelona	1–1	RCD Espanyol
2023–24	RCD Espanyol in Spanish Second Division		
2024–25	FC Barcelona	3–1	RCD Espanyol
2025–26	FC Barcelona	4–1	RCD Espanyol

FC Barcelona wins	Draws	RCD Espanyol wins
71	10	9

RCD Espanyol vs FC Barcelona
Season	Home team	Score	Away team
1928–29	RCD Espanyol	1–1	FC Barcelona
1929–30	RCD Espanyol	4–0	FC Barcelona
1930–31	RCD Espanyol	4–4	FC Barcelona
1931–32	RCD Espanyol	0–3	FC Barcelona
1932–33	RCD Espanyol	2–1	FC Barcelona
1933–34	RCD Espanyol	3–2	FC Barcelona
1934–35	RCD Espanyol	4–1	FC Barcelona
1935–36	RCD Espanyol	1–0	FC Barcelona
1936–37	Spanish Civil War		
1937–38	Spanish Civil War		
1938–39	Spanish Civil War		
1939–40	RCD Espanyol	1–1	FC Barcelona
1940–41	RCD Espanyol	3–1	FC Barcelona
1941–42	RCD Espanyol	5–2	FC Barcelona
1942–43	RCD Espanyol	1–3	FC Barcelona
1943–44	RCD Espanyol	1–3	FC Barcelona
1944–45	RCD Espanyol	1–1	FC Barcelona
1945–46	RCD Espanyol	0–2	FC Barcelona
1946–47	RCD Espanyol	0–1	FC Barcelona
1947–48	RCD Espanyol	2–1	FC Barcelona
1948–49	RCD Espanyol	1–1	FC Barcelona
1949–50	RCD Espanyol	2–2	FC Barcelona
1950–51	RCD Espanyol	6–0	FC Barcelona
1951–52	RCD Espanyol	1–0	FC Barcelona
1952–53	RCD Espanyol	0–2	FC Barcelona
1953–54	RCD Espanyol	0–1	FC Barcelona
1954–55	RCD Espanyol	2–4	FC Barcelona
1955–56	RCD Espanyol	0–3	FC Barcelona
1956–57	RCD Espanyol	2–0	FC Barcelona
1957–58	RCD Espanyol	2–1	FC Barcelona
1958–59	RCD Espanyol	0–3	FC Barcelona
1959–60	RCD Espanyol	0–1	FC Barcelona
1960–61	RCD Espanyol	1–2	FC Barcelona
1961–62	RCD Espanyol	1–1	FC Barcelona
1962–63	RCD Espanyol in Spanish Second Division		
1963–64	RCD Espanyol	2–2	FC Barcelona
1964–65	RCD Espanyol	0–0	FC Barcelona
1965–66	RCD Espanyol	1–1	FC Barcelona
1966–67	RCD Espanyol	2–0	FC Barcelona
1967–68	RCD Espanyol	1–0	FC Barcelona
1968–69	RCD Espanyol	0–0	FC Barcelona
1969–70	RCD Espanyol in Spanish Second Division		
1970–71	RCD Espanyol	0–1	FC Barcelona
1971–72	RCD Espanyol	3–0	FC Barcelona
1972–73	RCD Espanyol	1–1	FC Barcelona
1973–74	RCD Espanyol	0–0	FC Barcelona
1974–75	RCD Espanyol	5–2	FC Barcelona
1975–76	RCD Espanyol	3–0	FC Barcelona
1976–77	RCD Espanyol	2–3	FC Barcelona
1977–78	RCD Espanyol	1–1	FC Barcelona
1978–79	RCD Espanyol	0–2	FC Barcelona
1979–80	RCD Espanyol	2–0	FC Barcelona
1980–81	RCD Espanyol	1–0	FC Barcelona
1981–82	RCD Espanyol	0–4	FC Barcelona
1982–83	RCD Espanyol	0–3	FC Barcelona
1983–84	RCD Espanyol	1–0	FC Barcelona
1984–85	RCD Espanyol	0–0	FC Barcelona
1985–86	RCD Espanyol	5–3	FC Barcelona
1986–87	RCD Espanyol	1–1	FC Barcelona
1986–87	RCD Espanyol	0–0	FC Barcelona
1987–88	RCD Espanyol	2–0	FC Barcelona
1988–89	RCD Espanyol	2–2	FC Barcelona
1989–90	RCD Espanyol in Spanish Second Division		
1990–91	RCD Espanyol	0–1	FC Barcelona
1991–92	RCD Espanyol	0–4	FC Barcelona
1992–93	RCD Espanyol	0–1	FC Barcelona
1993–94	RCD Espanyol in Spanish Second Division		
1994–95	RCD Espanyol	0–0	FC Barcelona
1995–96	RCD Espanyol	1–1	FC Barcelona
1996–97	RCD Espanyol	2–0	FC Barcelona
1997–98	RCD Espanyol	1–1	FC Barcelona
1998–99	RCD Espanyol	1–2	FC Barcelona
1999–00	RCD Espanyol	1–1	FC Barcelona
2000–01	RCD Espanyol	0–0	FC Barcelona
2001–02	RCD Espanyol	2–0	FC Barcelona
2002–03	RCD Espanyol	0–2	FC Barcelona
2003–04	RCD Espanyol	1–3	FC Barcelona
2004–05	RCD Espanyol	0–1	FC Barcelona
2005–06	RCD Espanyol	1–2	FC Barcelona
2006–07	RCD Espanyol	3–1	FC Barcelona
2007–08	RCD Espanyol	1–1	FC Barcelona
2008–09	RCD Espanyol	1–2	FC Barcelona
2009–10	RCD Espanyol	0–0	FC Barcelona
2010–11	RCD Espanyol	1–5	FC Barcelona
2011–12	RCD Espanyol	1–1	FC Barcelona
2012–13	RCD Espanyol	0–2	FC Barcelona
2013–14	RCD Espanyol	0–1	FC Barcelona
2014–15	RCD Espanyol	0–2	FC Barcelona
2015–16	RCD Espanyol	0–0	FC Barcelona
2016–17	RCD Espanyol	0–3	FC Barcelona
2017–18	RCD Espanyol	1–1	FC Barcelona
2018–19	RCD Espanyol	0–4	FC Barcelona
2019–20	RCD Espanyol	2–2	FC Barcelona
2020–21	RCD Espanyol in Spanish Second Division		
2021–22	RCD Espanyol	2–2	FC Barcelona
2022–23	RCD Espanyol	2–4	FC Barcelona
2023–24	RCD Espanyol in Spanish Second Division		
2024–25	RCD Espanyol	0–2	FC Barcelona
2025–26	RCD Espanyol	0–2	FC Barcelona

RCD Espanyol wins	Draws	FC Barcelona wins
25	30	35

== Cup ==
Season	Round	Home team	Score	Away team	Winning team
1928–29	Semi-finals	RCD Espanyol	2–0	FC Barcelona	RCD Espanyol
1928–29	Semi-finals	FC Barcelona	1–1	RCD Espanyol	RCD Espanyol
1935–36	Quarter-finals	RCD Espanyol	2–1	FC Barcelona	FC Barcelona
1935–36	Quarter-finals	FC Barcelona	3–0	RCD Espanyol	FC Barcelona
1939–40	Quarter-finals	FC Barcelona	0–2	RCD Espanyol	RCD Espanyol
1939–40	Quarter-finals	RCD Espanyol	1–1	FC Barcelona	RCD Espanyol
1940–41	Round of 16	FC Barcelona	1–2	RCD Espanyol	RCD Espanyol
1940–41	Round of 16	RCD Espanyol	4–3	FC Barcelona	RCD Espanyol
1941–42	Quarter-finals	RCD Espanyol	2–3	FC Barcelona	FC Barcelona
1941–42	Quarter-finals	FC Barcelona	3–2	RCD Espanyol	FC Barcelona
1948–49	3rd Place	FC Barcelona	3–1	RCD Espanyol	FC Barcelona
1955–56	Quarter-finals	RCD Espanyol	3–1	FC Barcelona	RCD Espanyol
1955–56	Quarter-finals	FC Barcelona	4–4	RCD Espanyol	RCD Espanyol
1956–57	Final	FC Barcelona	1–0	RCD Espanyol	FC Barcelona
1960–61	Round of 16	FC Barcelona	2–3	RCD Espanyol	RCD Espanyol
1960–61	Round of 16	RCD Espanyol	2–1	FC Barcelona	RCD Espanyol
1963–64	Quarter-finals	FC Barcelona	3–1	RCD Espanyol	FC Barcelona
1963–64	Quarter-finals	RCD Espanyol	2–4	FC Barcelona	FC Barcelona
1969–70	Round of 32	RCD Espanyol	2–1	FC Barcelona	FC Barcelona
1969–70	Round of 32	FC Barcelona	3–1	RCD Espanyol	FC Barcelona
1973–74	Quarter-finals	RCD Espanyol	1–1	FC Barcelona	FC Barcelona
1973–74	Quarter-finals	FC Barcelona	2–0	RCD Espanyol	FC Barcelona
1984–85	Quarter-finals	RCD Espanyol	0–2	FC Barcelona	FC Barcelona
1984–85	Quarter-finals	FC Barcelona	3–0	RCD Espanyol	FC Barcelona
1987–88	Round of 16	RCD Espanyol	1–3	FC Barcelona	FC Barcelona
1987–88	Round of 16	FC Barcelona	1–0	RCD Espanyol	FC Barcelona
1995–96	Semi-finals	FC Barcelona	1–0	RCD Espanyol	FC Barcelona
1995–96	Semi-finals	RCD Espanyol	2–3	FC Barcelona	FC Barcelona
2000–01	Quarter-finals	RCD Espanyol	1–2	FC Barcelona	FC Barcelona
2000–01	Quarter-finals	FC Barcelona	1–1	RCD Espanyol	FC Barcelona
2008–09	Quarter-finals	RCD Espanyol	0–0	FC Barcelona	FC Barcelona
2008–09	Quarter-finals	FC Barcelona	3–2	RCD Espanyol	FC Barcelona
2015–16	Round of 16	FC Barcelona	4–1	RCD Espanyol	FC Barcelona
2015–16	Round of 16	RCD Espanyol	0–2	FC Barcelona	FC Barcelona
2017–18	Quarter-finals	RCD Espanyol	1–0	FC Barcelona	FC Barcelona
2017–18	Quarter-finals	FC Barcelona	2–0	RCD Espanyol	FC Barcelona

== Spanish Super Cup ==
Year	Home team	Score	Away team	Winning team
2006	RCD Espanyol	0–1	FC Barcelona	FC Barcelona
2006	FC Barcelona	3–0	RCD Espanyol	FC Barcelona

== Inter-Cities Fairs Cup ==
Season	Round	Home team	Score	Away team	Winning team
1965–66	Quarter-finals	FC Barcelona	1–0	RCD Espanyol	FC Barcelona
1965–66	Quarter-finals	RCD Espanyol	0–1	FC Barcelona	FC Barcelona

== Head-to-head ranking in La Liga (1929–2026) ==
P.	29	30	31	32	33	34	35	36	40	41	42	43	44	45	46	47	48	49	50	51	52	53	54	55	56	57	58	59	60	61	62	63	64	65	66	67	68	69	70	71	72	73	74	75	76	77	78	79	80	81	82	83	84	85	86	87	88	89	90	91	92	93	94	95	96	97	98	99	00	01	02	03	04	05	06	07	08	09	10	11	12	13	14	15	16	17	18	19	20	21	22	23	24	25	26
1	1													1			1	1			1	1						1	1														1											1						1	1	1	1				1	1						1	1			1	1	1		1		1	1		1	1				1		1	1
2		2													2								2	2	2						2		2			2	2			2		2			2	2	2				2				2	2		2								2			2				2			2					2		2			2			2		2		2		
3				3	3							3														3	3								3	3		3			3	3		3									3			3			3						3												3													3					
4		4	4		4					4						4				4		4	4							4									4						4				4			4												4	4					4	4																								
5								5	5										5																													5		5																								5																					
6				6			6						6																			6		6												6											6							6								6																							
7	7									7								7			7				7	7		7																																								7																				7							
8						8	8										8										8		8																			8						8																										8						8									
9			9			9			9		9			9																							9						9									9																		9																									
10								10																						10																				10			10														10											10						10											
11													11			11			11	11														11						11				11											11																					11			11								11								11
12											12	12			12																				12						12																									12											12																		
13																								13							13		13																		13																															13			13										
14																																															14		14																				14		14										14		14								14			14	
15																																						15																			15																		15																				
16																																																												16	16												16																						
17																																																										17														17																							
18																																																														18																																	
19																																																																																												19			
20																																																																																									20						
21																																																																																															
22																																																																																															

• Total:Espanyol with 4 higher finishes, FC Barcelona with 87 higher finishes (as of the end of the 2025–26 season).

== Players who played for both sides ==
- 1902: (Spain) Gustavo Green
- 1904: (Switzerland) George Meyer
- 1911: (Spain) José Quirante
- 1911: (Spain) Francisco Bru
- 1911: (Spain) Alfredo Massana
- 1911: (Spain) José Berdié
- 1911: (Spain) José Irízar
- 1911: (Spain) Luis Reñé (via Casual SC)
- 1911: (England) Charles Wallace
- 1911: (England) Percival Wallace
- 1912: (Spain) Antonio Morales
- 1912: (Spain) Pere Molins
- 1912: (England) Frank Allack
- 1912: (Spain) Carles Comamala (via Universitary SC)
- 1913: (Spain) Félix de Pomés (via Universitary SC, then Casual SC)
- 1913: (Spain) José Berrondo
- 1913: (Spain) Luis Bru
- 1913: (Spain) Francisco Armet
- 1913: (Spain) Manuel Lemmel (via Universitary SC)
- 1914: (Spain) Gabriel Bau (via FC Espanya)
- 1915: (Spain) Santiago Massana
- 1915: (Spain) Arsenio Morales
- 1916: (Spain) Casimiro Mallorquí
- 1917: (Spain) Joaquim Alfaro
- 1918: (Spain) Josep Julià
- 1918: (Spain) Buenaventura Vergés
- 1919: (Spain) Josep Segarra (via Sabadell, then FC Espanya)
- 1919: (Spain) Climent Gràcia (via FC Internacional)
- 1920: (Spain) Ramon Álvarez
- 1922: (Spain) Ricardo Zamora
- 1922: (Spain) Luis Blanco
- 1923: (Spain) Baldiri Elías
- 1923: (Spain) Marià Homs
- 1923: (Spain) José Landazabal (via FC Martinenc)
- 1926: (Spain) Vicente Tonijuán (via UE Sants)
- 1928: (Spain) Manuel Buj García
- 1929: (Spain) Ramón Parera
- 1930: (Spain) Cristòfol Solà
- 1931: (Spain) Conrad Portas Burcet
- 1931: (Spain) Francesc Bussot (via CE Júpiter)
- 1932: (Spain) Josep Sastre
- 1932: (Spain) Manuel Oró Comas (via Sabadell)
- 1932: (Spain) Antonio Franco
- 1933: (Spain) José Padrón (via Sevilla)
- 1933: (Spain) Martí Ventolrà (via Sevilla)
- 1933: (Spain) Enrique Mas Mirandas
- 1933: (Costa Rica) Alejandro Morera
- 1933: (Spain) Cristóbal Martí
- 1934: (Spain) Josep Escolà
- 1934: (Spain) Esteban Cifuentes
- 1935: (Spain) Ramón Lecuona
- 1937: (Spain) Severiano Goiburu (via Valencia)
- 1939: (Spain) Joan Morral Tarrés
- 1943: (Spain) Jaume Elías
- 1943: (Spain) Juan Sans Alsina (via Zaragoza, then Sabadell)
- 1943: (Spain) Josep Aguilar (via Celta Vigo, then Sabadell)
- 1945: (Spain) Juli Gonzalvo (via Zaragoza, then Sabadell)
- 1946: (Spain) Amador Lorenzo (via EC Granollers, then Real Madrid)
- 1947: (Spain) Basilio Nieto (via Castellón)
- 1947: (Spain) Jaume Sospedra
- 1949: (Spain) Valero (via Gimnàstic, then Granada)
- 1951: (Spain) Joan Babot (via Gimnàstic, then Real Valladolid)
- 1951: (Spain) Vicente Colino Hierro (via Sabadell)
- 1952: (Spain) Isidro Flotats
- 1952: (Spain) Joaquín Tejedor
- 1957: (Uruguay) Dagoberto Moll (via Condal)
- 1961: (Hungary) Zoltán Czibor
- 1962: (Spain) Antoni Camps
- 1963: (Spain) Justo Tejada (via Real Madrid)
- 1963: (Hungary) László Kubala
- 1966: (Paraguay) Cayetano Ré
- 1969: (Spain) Marcial Pina
- 1969: (Spain) Ramoní (via Granada)
- 1972: (Spain) José Luis Romero (via Sabadell)
- 1976: (Spain) Pepito Ramos
- 1979: (Brazil) Williams Silvio
- 1979: (Spain) Canito
- 1979: (Spain) Paco Fortes
- 1979: (Uruguay) Alfredo Amarillo (via Salamanca)
- 1980: (Spain) Jordi Carreño
- 1981: (Spain) Urruti
- 1981: (Spain) Miquel Corominas (via Salamanca)
- 1982: (Spain) Urbano Ortega
- 1986: (Spain) Pichi Alonso
- 1988: (Spain) Miquel Soler
- 1988: (Spain) Ernesto Valverde
- 1989: (Scotland) Steve Archibald (via Hibernian)
- 1992: (Spain) Fernando Muñoz (via Real Madrid)
- 1995: (Spain) Cristóbal Parralo (via Real Oviedo)
- 1995: (Spain) Luis Cembranos
- 1999: (Spain) Roger
- 1999: (Spain) Toni Velamazán (via Real Oviedo, then Albacete, then Extremadura)
- 2000: (Spain) Óscar (via Valencia)
- 2002: (Spain) Iván de la Peña (via Lazio)
- 2002: (Spain) Xavi Roca (via Villarreal)
- 2003: (Netherlands) Jordi Cruyff (via Manchester United, then Alavés)
- 2004: (Cameroon) Samuel Eto'o (via Real Madrid, then Mallorca)
- 2004: (Spain) Dani García (via Zaragoza)
- 2006: (Spain) Francisco Rufete (via Toledo, then Málaga, then Valencia)
- 2009: (Spain) Jonathan Soriano
- 2009: (Spain) Joan Verdú (via Deportivo La Coruña)
- 2010: (Spain) Sergio García (via Zaragoza, then Betis)
- 2012: (Portugal) Simão (via Benfica, then Atlético Madrid, then Beşiktaş)
- 2012: (Spain) Víctor Sánchez (via Neuchâtel Xamax)
- 2013: (Spain) Abraham González (via Cádiz, then Gimnàstic, then Alcorcón)
- 2014: (Spain) Paco Montañés (via 4 clubs)
- 2018: (Brazil) Philippe Coutinho (via Inter Milan, then Liverpool)
- 2020: (Spain) Oier Olazábal (via Granada, then Real Sociedad, then Levante)
- 2021: (Spain) Aleix Vidal (via Sevilla)
- 2022: (Denmark) Martin Braithwaite
- 2023: (Spain) Denis Suarez (via Celta Vigo)
- 2025: (Spain) Joan García

== Individual records ==
- Most appearances made: 36, Xavi (1998–2015)
- Most goals scored: 25, Lionel Messi (2004–2020)
- Most hat-tricks scored: 3, Lionel Messi (2004–2020)
- Most assists provided: 11, Lionel Messi (2004–2020)

== See also ==
- Catalan football championship
- El Clásico
- List of association football rivalries
- Madrid derby
- List of sports rivalries
- Nationalism and sport
