= Catalonia national football team =

Official association football team of Catalonia, Spain

Catalonia
- Association: Catalan Football Federation (Federació Catalana de Futbol)
- Confederation: None
- Head coach: Gerard López
- Captain: Oriol Romeu
- Most caps: Sergio García (16)
- Top scorer: Sergio García (9)
- Home stadium: Camp Nou; Estadi Cornellà-El Prat; Estadi Olímpic Lluís Companys; Estadi Montilivi; Johan Cruyff Stadium; Nova Creu Alta
- FIFA code: CAT
First colours	Second colours	Third colours

First international
- Not FIFA results Paris 3–1 Catalonia (San Sebastián, Spain; 24 July 1910); FIFA results France 7–0 Catalonia (Paris, France; 21 February 1912)

Biggest win
- Not FIFA results Catalonia 9–0 Brussels (Barcelona, Spain; 16 June 1927); FIFA results Catalonia 6–0 Jamaica (Girona, Spain; 25 May 2022)

Biggest defeat
- France 7–0 Catalonia (Paris, France; 21 February 1912); Spain 7–0 Catalonia (Barcelona, Spain; 13 March 1924)

The Catalonia national football team (Catalan: selecció de futbol de Catalunya, Spanish: selección de fútbol de Cataluña) is the official football team representing Catalonia. The Catalan Football Federation is the organisation in charge of the team and was founded in 1900. The team can also be referred to by various other names, including Selecció Catalana, and the Catalan XI.

Because the Catalan Federation is considered one of Spain's regional football federations by the Royal Spanish Football Federation, Catalonia is not eligible for membership in FIFA or UEFA as its own national association. As a result, the team is not permitted to participate in official international competitions such as the FIFA World Cup or the UEFA European Championship. With only a few exceptions involving players of other nationalities, Catalan players are Spanish citizens who are eligible to represent Spain at the international level instead.

Since its creation in 1904, the team has played nearly 200 matches against a range of national, regional, and club teams. International friendly matches have been played more regularly since 1997. Opponents have included national teams such as Nigeria, Brazil, and Argentina.

== History ==
=== First games ===
The Catalonia team made its debut in 1905. In its early years, it primarily played matches against club sides, including Club Espanyol, Madrid CF, FC Barcelona, and Irún Sporting Club. On 24 July 1910, the team played its first international match against a Paris XI, losing 1-3. Catalonia's goal in that match was scored by Carles Comamala. The lineup for the match was Costa, Bru, Halden, Massana, Aguirreche, Sampere, Barenys, Angoso, Berdié, Comamala, and Roteta.

On 20 February 1912, Catalonia played its first official international friendly against France, losing 7–0 in Paris. The Catalonia team consisted of Reñé, Irízar, Amechazurra, German, Peris, Kinké, Forns, Pepe Rodríguez, Comamala, Morales, and Ramirez. The two sides met again on 1 December 1912, in Barcelona, where Catalonia secured a 1–0 victory, with the winning goal scored by Genaro de la Riva of RCD Espanyol.

On 8 December 1912, Catalonia faced a selection of foreign players at the Camp de la Indústria in a benefit match for the Sindicat de Periodistes. The Catalan side won 5–2, with goals scored by Massana (two), Comamala, Forns, and an own goal by Wallace. The foreign team's goals were scored by Wallace and Stewart. Catalonia's lineup for the match was Renyé, Amechazurra, Irízar, A. Massana, Sagnier, Quirante, Armet-Kinké, A. Comamala, C. Comamala, Janer, and Forns, while the foreign selection comprised Manchan, Braussendorf, Wallace, Rositzky, Greenwell, Morris, Allack, Kaiser, Steel, Stewart, and McLean.

In 1914, the Catalan XI played the Basque Country XI for the first time, although no record of the result survived. The first recorded match between the two sides took place on 3 January 1915 at San Mamés Stadium and ended in a 6–1 defeat for Catalonia.

=== Copa Príncep d'Astúries ===
Between 1915 and 1926, the Catalan XI competed in the Copa Príncep d'Astúries, an inter-regional competition. They finished as runners-up in 1915 and won for the first time in 1916, beating a Castile/Madrid XI 8–5 over two games, including a shocking 6–3 win in the first leg at the Campo de O'Donnell in Madrid. They then relinquished the trophy in 1917 after losing 2–0 to a weak Castile XI side. During the 1920s, a team featuring Josep Samitier, Paulino Alcántara, Sagibarba and Ricardo Zamora helped the Catalan XI win the competition in 1924 and 1926. In the quarter-finals of the former, Catalonia defeated a Gipuzkoa XI featuring René Petit by a score of 2–1, and then beat Biscay XI 1–0 in the semi-finals, with the solitary goal being scored by Cristóbal Martí. The final was played on 24 February 1924 in San Mamés against a Castile/Madrid XI, and the game was a back-and-forth clash. At the end of regulation time, the match was tied at 3–3, with Samitier (2) and Piera scoring the Catalan goals. In extra time, Juan Monjardín appeared to have won the game for the Castile/Madrid XI when he scored past Zamora, but with two minutes remaining, Emili Sagi-Barba leveled the score at 4–4, and the draw forced a replay two days later. In the second match, Catalonia ended up winning 3–2 with goals from Carulla, Samitier and Piera, thus becoming champion. The last edition of the competition was a two-legged final between the winners of the previous two, Asturias XI and Catalonia, and Catalonia won both games (2–0 and 4–3). The Catalan goalscorers were Domingo Broto(2), Josep Forgas(2), Juan Pellicer and Paulino Alcántara.

As well as playing other regional teams from throughout Spain and Europe, the 1920s also saw the Catalan XI play several international friendly matches. On 13 March 1924, at the Camp de Les Corts, the Catalan XI played Spain for the first time. The Spain XI included Josep Samitier and Zamora, regarded as two of the best Catalan players of the era, while the Catalan XI featured Alcántara and Sagibarba. Samitier scored twice to help Spain to a 7–0 win. On 13 December 1925, Samitier, Zamora, Alcántara and Sagibarba were on the same side as the Catalan XI beat Czechoslovakia at the Estadi de Sarrià. After conceding a penalty and going down 1–0, Sagibarba then equalized with another penalty before Samitier clinched a 2–1 win. On 7 July 1926, the Catalan XI played Czechoslovakia in Prague. Despite Samitier scoring the match's first goal for Catalonia, they eventually lost 2–1.

=== Catalonia vs. Brazil ===
During the 1930s, Catalonia continued playing friendly games against an array of teams with 1934 including the bulk of their more-competitive friendlies. On 2 February, they played Spain and lost 2–0 at Les Corts. Four months later, they played Brazil twice. On 17 June, the Catalan XI beat Brazil 2–1 at Les Corts and then on 24 June, they held them to a 2–2 draw at the Vista Alegre in Girona. The Brazil team had been in Europe to play in the official 1934 FIFA World Cup and their team included the legendary Leônidas. The Catalan XI beat the reigning official La Liga champions, Athletic Bilbao, 5–1, on 29 June to close out the month.

=== The Franco era ===
After the Spanish Civil War, caudillo Francisco Franco imposed several restrictions on Catalonia, abolishing the Generalitat de Catalunya and banning the official use of the Catalan language and the Catalan flag. Despite these restrictions, the Catalan XI continued to play regularly during this period and even played Spain twice. On 19 October 1947, at Sarrià and with a team featuring Juan Velasco, Marià Gonzalvo, Joan Segarra and César, they beat Spain 3–1. On 9 August 1953, Spain avenged this defeat with a 6–0 win.

During this era, several notable Barcelona players, including the Spanish players László Kubala, Luis Suárez, Evaristo and later Chus Pereda, played for the Catalan XI. On 26 January 1955, in a friendly game against Bologna at Les Corts, Kubala was also joined by another guest player, Alfredo Di Stéfano. The Catalan XI won 6–2 with two goals from Kubala and one from Di Stéfano. On 1 September 1956, Di Stéfano returned to Les Corts with Real Madrid, recent winners of the first official European Cup, and played a Selecció de Barcelona. Real won the game 7–3.

The Catalan XI marked the end of the Franco era with a friendly game against the Soviet Union at the Camp Nou on 6 June 1976. The team included Carles Rexach, guest Netherlands players Johan Cruyff and Johan Neeskens and Chilean international Carlos Caszely who played for Espanyol. The game finished 1–1 with Neeskens scoring for the Catalan XI. Cruyff's son, Jordi, would subsequently play regularly for the Catalan XI.

=== Democratic era ===
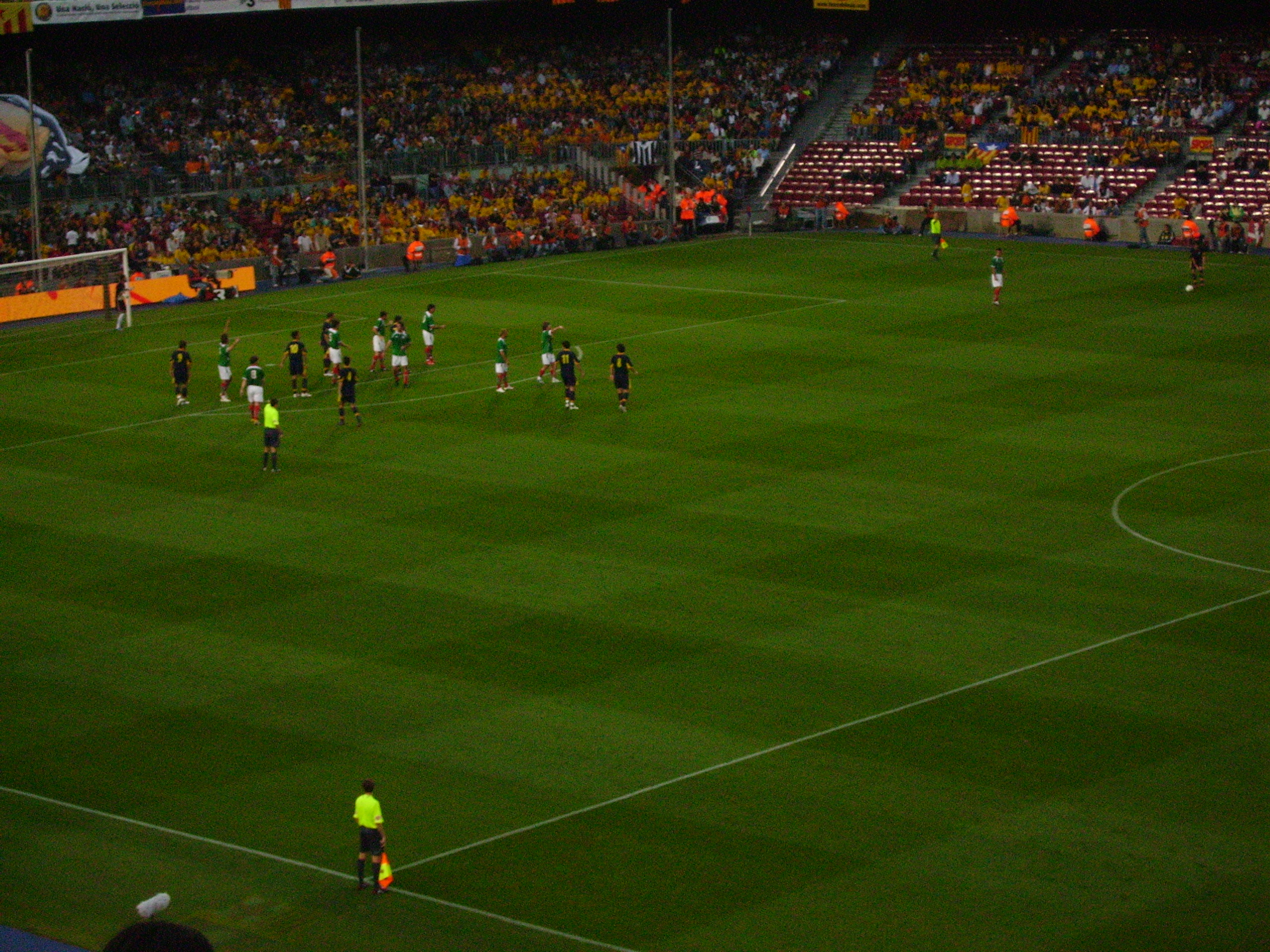
Catalonia playing against the Basque Country at the Camp Nou

Since the restoration of democracy in the 1970s, the Catalonia representative team has regularly played international friendly matches. They put together a string of successful results against countries like Bulgaria, Nigeria, Yugoslavia, Lithuania and Chile. On 5 May 2002, Catalonia hosted Brazil in a warm-up friendly game before the official 2002 World Cup. Brazil, who went on to win the official competition, beat Catalonia 3–1. In 2004, Brazil returned for a second friendly game and this time won 5–2 at the Camp Nou, where some months later Argentina defeated Catalonia 3–0. The last friendly matches have been against Paraguay, Costa Rica, Basque Country, Argentina and Colombia.

=== Johan Cruyff era ===
On 2 November 2009, it was announced that Dutch legend and former Barcelona manager Johan Cruyff would be the new coach of Catalonia. On 22 December 2009, they played a friendly against Argentina, which ended in a Catalonia win, 4–2 at Camp Nou. On 28 December 2010, Catalonia played another friendly against Honduras winning 4–0 at Estadi Olímpic Lluís Companys. On 30 December 2011, Catalonia played Tunisia in a goalless draw at the Lluís Companys. In their last game under Cruyff, on 2 January 2013, Catalonia drew with Nigeria at the Cornellà-El Prat, 1–1.

=== Post-Cruyff era ===
Former player Gerard was appointed as the new coach of the Catalan team for two years. His first match with the team took place on 30 December 2013 against the Cape Verde at the Olímpic Lluís Companys.

== Fixtures and results ==
=== 2022 ===
25 May (Note: The Catalonia v Jamaica match, originally scheduled for 30 March 2020 at the Camp d'Esports, Lleida was postponed due to the coronavirus. The match was later rescheduled to 25 May 2022 at the Estadi Montilivi, Girona.) Friendly	Catalonia	6–0	Jamaica	Girona, Catalonia
18:45	Deulofeu 3', 28', 44'; Bartra 35'; Jutglà 74'; Puado 88'	Report		Stadium: Estadi Montilivi; Attendance: 6,124; Referee: Victor Garcia Serundra (Spain)

=== 2023 ===
8 June Friendly	Catalonia	Cancelled	Mali	Lleida, Catalonia
19:00		Report		Stadium: Camp d'Esports

=== 2024 ===
29 May Friendly	Catalonia	2–2	Panama	Sabadell, Catalonia
19:00	Jutglà 9'; Aleñá 92'	Report	E. Davis 17'; Gondola 27'	Stadium: Estadi de la Nova Creu Alta; Attendance: 5.859; Referee: Victor Garcia Verdura (Spain)

=== 2025 ===
28 May Friendly	Catalonia	2–0	Costa Rica	Sant Joan Despí, Catalonia
19:00	A. Roca 71'; Aleñá 89'	Report		Stadium: Johan Cruyff Stadium; Attendance: 5.352; Referee: Víctor García Verdura (Spain)

18 November Friendly	Catalonia	2–1	Palestine	Barcelona, Catalonia
18:30	Ilie 4'; Mahajna 27' (o.g.)	Report	Zeidan 30'	Stadium: Lluís Companys Olympic Stadium; Attendance: 30,018; Referee: Víctor Garcia Verdura (Spain)

== Coaching staff ==
=== Manager history ===
1. Pichi Alonso (1995–2005)
2. Pere Gratacós (2005–2009)
3. Johan Cruyff (2009–2013)
4. Gerard López (2013–2016)
5. Sergio González (2015–2018)
6. Gerard López (2018–present)

== Players ==
Due to the unofficial status of the Catalonia team and others, many of the usual conventions of international football do not apply. Players who have already appeared for a FIFA national team can play for the Catalans in addition, but if they are simultaneously called up for both, the FIFA squad (usually Spain) takes precedence. Clubs are also not obligated to release their players, and the request is sometimes refused by clubs outside the Spanish leagues, or when the fixture takes place during the domestic season and the club has important upcoming fixtures. Eligible players can also choose not to be involved. This means the Catalan squads are frequently below what would be considered their 'full strength', but also means those who do take part are fully committed to the concept, and in many cases would have no other opportunities to experience international football so consider the match to be an important matter. This contrasts with their opponents, as the fixture does not contribute to their Association ranking points or individual cap totals and is thus one of the least significant matches out of several they would play each year. In combination with home advantage for the Catalan team in most of their fixtures, this has led to the results falling in their favour more often than might be expected compared to other nations perceived to have a similar standard of players.

=== Current squad ===
- The following players were called up for the friendly match against Palestine, on 18 November 2025.
- Caps and goals are correct as of 18 November 2025, after the match against Palestine.

No.	Pos.	Player	Date of birth (age)	Caps	Goals	Club
1	GK	Arnau Tenas	30 May 2001 (age 25)	2	0	(Royal Spanish Football Federation) Mallorca
13	GK	Ángel Fortuño	5 October 2001 (age 25)	1	0	(Royal Spanish Football Federation) Espanyol
2	DF	Adrià Altimira	28 March 2001 (age 25)	2	0	(Royal Spanish Football Federation) Deportivo A Coruña
3	DF	Àlex Cano	7 March 1988 (age 38)	1	0	(Royal Spanish Football Federation) Europa
5	DF	Marc Bombardó	23 November 2005 (age 20)	1	0	(Andorran Football Federation) Andorra
7	DF	Arnau Campeny	2 January 1997 (age 29)	1	0	(Catalan Football Federation) Europa
12	DF	David Astals	13 December 2001 (age 24)	1	0	(Catalan Football Federation) Sabadell
15	DF	Martí Vilà	26 May 1999 (age 27)	1	0	(Andorran Football Federation) Andorra
4	MF	Ilie Sánchez	29 November 1990 (age 35)	1	1	(United States Soccer Federation) Austin
6	MF	Marc Bernal	26 May 2007 (age 19)	1	0	(Royal Spanish Football Federation) FC Barcelona
8	MF	Marc Domènech	1 November 2002 (age 24)	1	0	(Andorran Football Federation) Andorra
10	MF	Sergio Gómez	4 September 2000 (age 26)	3	0	(Royal Spanish Football Federation) Real Sociedad
14	MF	Ramon Terrats	18 October 2000 (age 26)	3	0	(Royal Spanish Football Federation) Espanyol
16	MF	Marc Montalvo	9 April 2002 (age 24)	1	0	(Royal Spanish Football Federation) Gimnàstic
17	MF	Jofre Carreras	17 June 2001 (age 25)	2	0	(Royal Spanish Football Federation) Espanyol
18	MF	Albert Orriols	2 December 1997 (age 28)	1	0	(Catalan Football Federation) Sabadell
20	MF	Antoniu Roca	5 September 2002 (age 24)	2	1	(Royal Spanish Football Federation) Espanyol
21	MF	Albertito	11 September 1998 (age 28)	1	0	(Catalan Football Federation) Sant Andreu
9	FW	Pau Víctor	26 November 2001 (age 24)	2	0	(Portuguese Football Federation) Braga
11	FW	Joel Roca	7 June 2005 (age 21)	1	0	(Hellenic Football Federation) Olympiacos
19	FW	Jordi Cano	1 April 1995 (age 31)	1	0	(Catalan Football Federation) Europa
22	FW	Jaume Jardí	7 April 2002 (age 24)	1	0	(Royal Spanish Football Federation) Gimnàstic

=== Recent call-ups ===
The following players have been called up for the team within the last few matches and are still available for selection.

Pos.	Player	Date of birth (age)	Caps	Goals	Club	Latest call-up
GK	Daniel Cárdenas	28 March 1997 (age 29)	3	0	(Spain) Rayo Vallecano	v. Costa Rica, 28 May 2025
GK	Joan García	4 May 2001 (age 25)	1	0	(Spain) FC Barcelona	v. Costa Rica, 28 May 2025
DF	Arnau Martínez	25 April 2003 (age 23)	2	0	(Spain) Girona	v. Palestine, 18 November 2025 ^{WD}
DF	Àlex Moreno	8 June 1993 (age 33)	2	0	(Spain) Girona	v. Palestine, 18 November 2025 ^{WD}
DF	Sergi Cardona	8 July 1999 (age 27)	2	0	(Spain) Villarreal	v. Costa Rica, 28 May 2025
DF	Eric García	9 January 2001 (age 25)	2	0	(Spain) FC Barcelona	v. Costa Rica, 28 May 2025
DF	David López	9 October 1989 (age 37)	2	0	(Spain) Girona	v. Costa Rica, 28 May 2025
DF	Mika Mármol	1 July 2001 (age 25)	2	0	(Spain) Las Palmas	v. Costa Rica, 28 May 2025
DF	Gerard Martín	26 February 2002 (age 24)	0	0	(Spain) FC Barcelona	v. Costa Rica, 28 May 2025 ^{WD}
DF	Óscar Mingueza	13 May 1999 (age 27)	2	0	(England) Crystal Palace	v. Panama, 29 May 2024
DF	Héctor Bellerín	19 March 1995 (age 31)	1	0	(Spain) Real Betis	v. Panama, 29 May 2024
DF	Marc Pubill	20 June 2003 (age 23)	1	0	(Spain) Atlético Madrid	v. Panama, 29 May 2024
DF	Sergi Gómez	28 March 1992 (age 34)	3	0	(Portugal) Alverca	v. Panama, 29 May 2024 ^{WD}
MF	Carles Aleñá	5 January 1998 (age 28)	3	2	(Spain) Deportivo Alavés	v. Costa Rica, 28 May 2025
MF	Edu Expósito	1 August 1996 (age 30)	1	0	(Spain) Espanyol	v. Costa Rica, 28 May 2025
MF	Aleix García	28 June 1997 (age 29)	2	0	(Germany) Bayer Leverkusen	v. Costa Rica, 28 May 2025
MF	Pol Lozano	6 October 1999 (age 27)	1	0	(Spain) Espanyol	v. Costa Rica, 28 May 2025
MF	Raúl Moro	5 December 2002 (age 23)	0	0	(Spain) Osasuna	v. Costa Rica, 28 May 2025
MF	Oriol Romeu	24 September 1991 (age 35)	4	0	(England) Southampton	v. Costa Rica, 28 May 2025
MF	Gerard Gumbau	18 December 1994 (age 31)	2	0	(Spain) Rayo Vallecano	v. Panama, 29 May 2024
MF	Marc Roca	26 November 1996 (age 29)	2	0	(Spain) Real Betis	v. Panama, 29 May 2024
MF	Sergi Altimira	25 August 2001 (age 25)	1	0	(Spain) Real Betis	v. Panama, 29 May 2024
MF	Jastin García	15 January 2004 (age 22)	1	0	Andorra	v. Panama, 29 May 2024
MF	Joan Jordán	6 July 1994 (age 32)	3	0	(Spain) Sevilla	v. Panama, 29 May 2024
MF	Samu Castillejo	18 January 1995 (age 31)	2	1	(Malaysia) Johor Darul Ta'zim	v. Panama, 29 May 2024
FW	Keita Baldé	8 March 1995 (age 31)	2	0	(Italy) Monza	v. Costa Rica, 28 May 2025
FW	Ferran Jutglà	1 February 1999 (age 27)	3	2	(Spain) Celta Vigo	v. Costa Rica, 28 May 2025
FW	Marc Cardona	8 July 1995 (age 31)	2	0	(Thailand) Bangkok United	v. Panama, 29 May 2024
FW	Aitor Ruibal	22 March 1996 (age 30)	0	0	(Spain) Real Betis	v. Panama, 29 May 2024 ^{WD}
^{WD} = Player withdrew from the squad due to non-injury issue.

=== Notable players ===
- For a list of recent Catalonia national team players, see here
- For a list of players from Catalonia who have represented FIFA national teams, see here

=== Guest players ===
Because Catalonia is not a member of either UEFA or FIFA due to it being a region of Spain and plays only in unofficial friendly matches, normal eligibility rules based on birthplace do not apply, and a number of players who were not born in Catalonia and played for other international teams have guested for the Catalan XI, although this is much less frequent in the 21st century. With the notable exception of Alfredo Di Stéfano, most were playing for Barcelona or Espanyol at the time. Some of these players, such as Andrés Iniesta, César Rodríguez, Francisco Bru, Guillermo Amor and Pepe Reina had lived a large part of their lives in Catalonia due to their football careers.

Spain

- Andrés Iniesta
- César Rodríguez
- Chus Pereda
- Francisco Bru
- Gallego
- Gerard Piqué
- Guillermo Amor
- José Bravo
- José Luis Zabala
- José María
- José María Rodilla
- Juan José Nogués
- Juan Velasco
- Juan Verdugo Pérez
- Luis Suárez
- Manuel Osorio
- Manuel Polinario
- Manuel Sanchis Martinez
- Marcial Pina
- Miguel Ángel Ochoa
- Nando García
- Pepe Reina
- Quique Costas
- Rosendo Hernández
- Severiano Goiburu
- Simón Lecue

Other countries

- (Costa Rica) Alejandro Morera Soto
- (Chile) Carlos Caszely
- (Uruguay) Dagoberto Moll
- (Uruguay) Enrique Fernández
- (Paraguay) (Spain) Eulogio Martínez
- (Brazil) Evaristo de Macedo
- (Bulgaria) Hristo Stoichkov
- (Peru) Hugo Sotil
- (Netherlands) Johan Neeskens
- (Spain) (Indonesia) Jordi Amat
- (Netherlands) Johan Cruyff
- (Netherlands) Jordi Cruyff
- (Czechoslovakia) (Hungary) (Spain) László Kubala
- (Paraguay) Luis César Ortiz
- (France) Marcel Domingo
- (Paraguay) Melanio Olmedo
- (Bulgaria) Nasko Sirakov
- (Senegal) Keita Baldé

== Honours ==
- Copa Príncep d'Astúries
  - Winners (3): 1916, 1923–24, 1926
  - Runners-up (2): 1915, 1917
- Catalonia International Trophy
  - Winners (3): 2009, 2010, 2013
  - Runners-up (3): 2011, 2012, 2016

== Head-to-head record ==
As of 18 November 2025

Opponent	Pld	W	D	L	GF	GA	GD	Win %
Argentina (Note: Including one match against the Argentina Olympic squad in 2008.)	3	1	0	2	4	6	−2	33.33
Brazil	4	1	1	2	7	11	−4	25.00
Bulgaria	1	0	1	0	1	1	+0	0.00
Cape Verde	1	1	0	0	4	1	+3	100.00
Chile	1	1	0	0	1	0	+1	100.00
China	1	1	0	0	2	0	+2	100.00
Colombia	1	1	0	0	2	1	+1	100.00
Costa Rica	1	1	0	0	2	0	+2	100.00
Czechoslovakia	2	1	0	1	3	3	+0	50.00
Ecuador	1	1	0	0	4	2	+2	100.00
FR Yugoslavia	1	1	0	0	1	0	+1	100.00
France	2	1	0	1	1	7	−6	50.00
Honduras	1	1	0	0	4	0	+4	100.00
Jamaica	1	1	0	0	6	0	+6	100.00
Lithuania	1	1	0	0	5	0	+5	100.00
Nigeria	2	1	1	0	6	1	+5	50.00
Panama	1	0	1	0	2	2	+0	0.00
Paraguay	1	0	1	0	1	1	+0	0.00
Soviet Union	1	0	1	0	1	1	+0	0.00
Spain	4	1	0	3	3	16	−13	25.00
Tunisia	2	0	2	0	3	3	+0	0.00
Venezuela	1	1	0	0	2	1	+1	100.00
Palestine	2	2	0	0	5	1	+3	100.00
Total (23 opponents)	36	19	8	9	70	58	+12	52.78

== See also ==
- Catalonia women's national football team
- Catalan football championship
- Catalonia national basketball team
- Catalonia national rugby league team
- Catalonia national rugby union team
