= 1913 UECF Copa del Rey final =

- Event: 1913 Copa del Rey
Barcelona	Real Sociedad
4	3
- After both legs ended tied, Barcelona won 2-1 in playoff

First leg
Barcelona	Real Sociedad
2	2
- Date: 16 March 1913
- Venue: Camp de la Indústria, Barcelona
- Referee: Angosto

Second leg
Real Sociedad	Barcelona
0	0
- Date: 17 March 1913
- Venue: Camp de la Indústria, Barcelona
- Referee: Angosto

Playoff
Real Sociedad	Barcelona
1	2
- Date: 23 March 1913
- Venue: Camp de la Indústria, Barcelona
- Referee: Angosto

The 1913 Copa del Rey final (UECF) was the 12th final of the Spanish cup competition, the Copa del Rey. The two-legged final was contested by FC Barcelona and Real Sociedad, with all the matches being played at Camp de la Indústria in Barcelona.

The first leg, held on 16 March, ended with a 2–2 draw thanks to a last-minute goal from Sociedad's Juan Artola, while the second leg also ended in a tie (0–0). The resultant playoff game was scheduled for 23 March due to the Holy Week celebrations in Spain, in that match Barcelona defeated Real Sociedad 2–1, winning the trophy for the third time in their history.

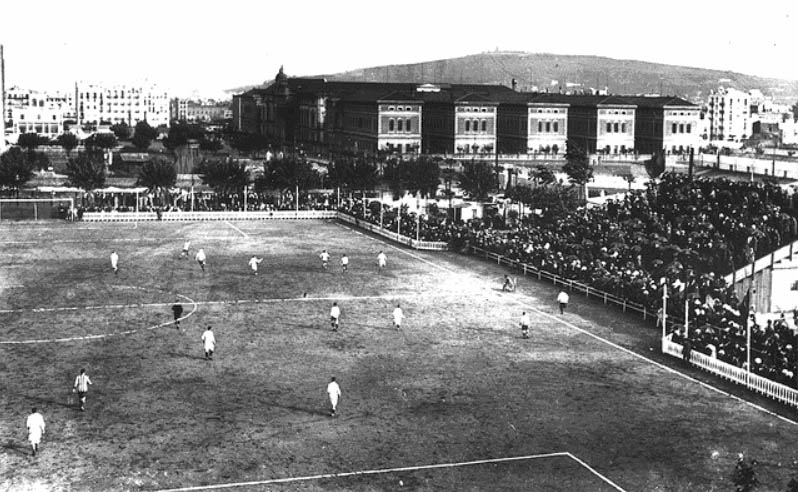
The Camp de la Indústria in Barcelona was the venue for all the matches

== Match details ==
=== First leg ===
16 March 1913

Real Sociedad	2–2	Barcelona
Arrillaga 15'; Artola 89'	Report1; Report2	Forns 49'; A. Rodríguez 69'

Camp de la Indústria, Barcelona
Referee: (Spain) Eugenio Angosto

GK	(Spain) Ramón Anechino
DF	(Spain) José Berraondo (c)
DF	(Spain) Mariano Arrate
MF	(Spain) José Arruti
MF	(Spain) Alberto Machimbarrena
MF	(Spain) Barandiarán
FW	(Spain) Juan Artola
FW	(Spain) Domingo Arrillaga
FW	(Spain) Eusebio Leturia
FW	(Spain) Alfonso Sena
FW	(Guatemala) José Minondo

GK	(Spain) Luis Reñé
DF	(Spain) José Irízar
DF	(Spain) Manuel Amechazurra (c)
MF	(Spain) Manuel Castejón
MF	(Spain) Alfredo Massana
MF	(Argentina) Mariano Bori
FW	(Spain) Romà Forns
FW	(Spain) Miguel Oller
FW	(Spain) José Berdié
FW	(Spain) Apolinario Rodríguez
FW	(Spain) Enrique Peris

=== Second leg ===
17 March 1913

Barcelona	0–0	Real Sociedad
	Report1; Report2

Camp de la Indústria, Barcelona
Referee: (Spain) Eugenio Angosto

GK	(Spain) Luis Reñé
DF	(Spain) José Irízar	(substituted off) a'
DF	(Spain) Manuel Amechazurra (c)
MF	(Spain) Manuel Castejón
MF	(Spain) Alfredo Massana
MF	(Argentina) Mariano Bori
FW	(Spain) Romà Forns
FW	(Spain) Miguel Oller
FW	(Spain) Paulino Alcántara
FW	(Spain) Apolinario Rodríguez
FW	(Spain) Enrique Peris
Substitutes:
	(Spain) José Berrondo	(substituted in) a'

GK	(Spain) Agustín Eizaguirre
DF	(Spain) José Berraondo (c)
DF	(Spain) Mariano Arrate
MF	(Spain) José Arruti
MF	(Spain) Alberto Machimbarrena
MF	(Spain) Eusebio Leturia
FW	(Spain) Juan Artola
FW	(Spain) Domingo Arrillaga	(substituted off) a'
FW	(Spain) R. Fernández
FW	(Spain) Alfonso Sena
FW	(Guatemala) José Minondo
Substitutes:
	(Spain) Francisco Larrañaga	(substituted in) a'

=== Playoff ===
23 March 1913
Playoff

Barcelona	2–1	Real Sociedad
Berdié 33'; A. Rodríguez 35'	Report1; Report2	Rezola 12' (pen.)

Camp de la Indústria, Barcelona
Referee: (Spain) Eugenio Angosto

Barcelona
Real Sociedad

GK	(Spain) Luis Reñé
DF	(Spain) José Irízar
DF	(Spain) Manuel Amechazurra (c)
MF	(Spain) Manuel Castejón
MF	(Spain) Alfredo Massana
MF	(Argentina) Mariano Bori
FW	(Spain) Romà Forns
FW	(Spain) Miguel Oller	(substituted off) a'
FW	(Spain) José Berdié
FW	(Spain) Apolinario Rodríguez
FW	(Spain) Enrique Peris
Substitutes:
FW	(Spain) Paulino Alcántara	(substituted in) a'

GK	(Spain) Agustín Eizaguirre
DF	(Spain) Eguía
DF	(Spain) Mariano Arrate
MF	(Spain) José Arruti
MF	(Spain) Alberto Machimbarrena
MF	(Spain) Eusebio Leturia
FW	(Spain) Juan Artola
FW	(Spain) Domingo Arrillaga
FW	(Spain) Eugenio Rezola
FW	(Spain) Alfonso Sena (c)
FW	(Guatemala) José Minondo

== See also ==
- 1910 UECF Copa del Rey Final
- 1913 FEF Copa del Rey Final
