= Casual SC =

Football club in Spain active between 1911 and 1913

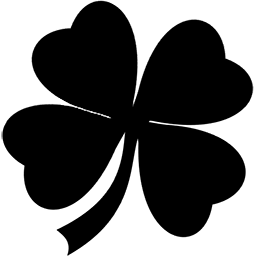
- A clover, the club's symbol
- Nicknames: The casual ones The clover ones
- Short name: Casual SC
- Founded: December 1911
- Dissolved: June 1913
- Ground: Camp del Salut SC
- League: Catalan championship
Home colours

The Casual Sport Club, commonly referred to as Casual SC, was a football team based in Barcelona, Spain, which existed from December 1911 until its dissolution in June 1913.

It was founded in late 1911 by a group of dissident players from FC Barcelona, which was made up of the likes of José Quirante, Paco Bru, the Comamala brothers (Carles and Arsenio), and the Wallace brothers (Charles and Percy). It did not last long, however, as the Comamalas began dedicated themselves to tennis, Quirante to cycling, while the Wallace and Bru joined RCD Espanyol.

== History ==
=== Origins ===
In 1911, FC Barcelona suffered a major crisis due to professionalism. At a time when footballers were amateurs, some of the club's players, led by José Quirante, wanted to share the profits from the tickets, but the then Barcelona president Joan Gamper, a fervent defender of amateurism, who had always strongly opposed professionalism in Barça, refused. This caused a split within the club, and although Gamper's side was able to weather the storm with Quirante's opposition sector, they could not prevent indiscipline from being fostered among the elements of this group, whose members, seduced by false flatterers, openly stood against the board. Faced with the club's refusal, some of these players attempt to arrange, behind the club's knowledge, a friendly match in Valencia for a value of 1500 pesetas, but Gamper opposed it, and in an assembly held on 16 October 1911, it was decreed for these rebel players to be expelled from the club. This group included the likes of Quirante, Paco Bru, the Comamala brothers (Carles and Arsenio), the Wallace brothers (Charles and Percy), Félix de Pomés, Romà Solà, and Miquel Mensa, among others.

A few weeks later, founded "Casual", the Dissidents, as they were known, created a new club in December 1911 called Casual FC, whose name already revealed the improvised way in which it was founded. The club wore white with a four-leaf clover on the chest. Instead of having a traditional board of directors with presidents and secretaries, the club only admitted the players themselves as members. In February 1912 the club was admitted by the Catalan Football Federation. In May, Casual reached an agreement with Salut SC to establish itself in the organization's facilities (headquarters), becoming a section of it and adopting the name Team Casual of the Salud Sport Club, or simply Casual SC.

=== Tournaments ===
In October 1912, the club was admitted into the first category of the Catalan championship, finishing the 1912–13 edition in fifth position.

In March 1913, Casual SC participated in its most important tournament, the fourth edition of the Pyrenees Cup, an international competition contested by Spanish and French clubs based in the territories of Pyrénées, with Casual being one of the four representatives from Catalonia alongside FC Barcelona, RCD Espanyol, and FC Espanya, with the latter withdrawing before the tournament while Casual faced Barça in the quarterfinals, which ended in a humiliating 0–7 loss, with goals from Alexander Steel (3), Frank Allack (2), and Apolinario Rodríguez (2).

== Decline and collapse ==
Despite some encouraging first steps in the white club, it was possibly the fact of losing the 1903 Cup final that caused a convulsive situation within the entity that led to its end. Three months later, in June 1903, the union with Salut SC was dissolved and the club disappeared. As for its components, Quirante dedicated himself to cycling, in which he was an exceptional figure; the Comamala brothers switched to tennis, which they had begun practicing at Salut; and the Wallace brothers, Paco Bru and Pomés joined RCD Espanyol.

With the disappearance of Irish FC, most of its players joined FC Barcelona at the beginning of the 1903–04 season, such as Comamala, Forns, and Marial, with the latter going on to become the 6th President of FC Barcelona, while the former two became key players in Barça's first golden team of the early 1910s.
