= Juan Artola (footballer, born 1895) =

Spanish footballer

- Juan Artola Portrait

Personal information
- Full name: Juan Artola Letamendía
- Date of birth: 29 November 1895
- Place of birth: Catalonia, Spain
- Date of death: 1937 (aged 42)
- Position: Midfielder

Senior career*
Years	Team	Apps	(Gls)
1912-1915	Real Sociedad		
1915–1916	Madrid FC		
1916-1917	Real Betis		
1917–1919	Sevilla FC		
1919–1924	Real Sociedad		

International career
1920	Catalonia	2	(0)
1914-1916	Basque Country		
Medal record
Men's football
Representing Spain
Olympic Games
Silver medal – second place	1920 Antwerp	Team competition
Basque Country
Prince of Asturias Cup
Gold medal – first place	1915 Prince of Asturias Cup	Team
- * Club domestic league appearances and goals

Juan Artola Letamendía (29 November 1895 (Note: Some sources say, that he was born on 28 November.) – 1937) was a Spanish footballer who played as a midfielder. He was a member of the Spanish team which won the silver medal in the football tournament.

== Club career ==
Born in San Sebastián, he began his career at the youth football club Deportiva Esperanza, before reaching the first team of Real Sociedad team in 1913, where he remained until 1915. In his first season with the club, he helped them reach the 1913 Copa del Rey Final (UECF), where they found themselves trailing 1-2 with seconds to go, but Artola scored a last-minute equalizer that forced a replay that also ended in a draw before finally being beaten 1-2 by Barcelona FC.

== International career ==
He represented the Spain national team at the 1920 Summer Olympics, featuring in two games against Belgium and Italy as Spain won the silver medal.

Being a Real Sociedad player, he was eligible to play for the Basque Country national team, and he was a member of the team that won the first edition of the Prince of Asturias Cup in 1915, an inter-regional competition organized by the RFEF. Artola was a starter in both games against Catalonia and Centro (a Castile/Madrid XI), helping his side to assure the competition's first-ever title.

== Honours ==
=== Club ===
Real Sociedad

Copa del Rey:

- Runner-up (1) 1913

=== International ===
Spain

- Olympic Games Silver medal: 1920

Norte

Prince of Asturias Cup:

- Champions (1): 1915
