= 1913 Pyrenees Cup =

Tournament details
- Country: Marca Hispanica
- Dates: 2 March – 8 June
- Teams: 6

Final positions
- Champions: FC Barcelona (4th title)
- Runner-up: La Comète et Simiot

Tournament statistics
- Matches played: 4
- Goals scored: 27 (6.75 per match)
- Top goal scorer(s): Alexander Steel (3 goals)

The 1913 Pyrenees Cup was the 4th tournament of the Pyrenees Cup, one of the first international football club competitions. The competition was held on the road between 2 March and 8 June, and it was won by FC Barcelona after easily disposing of La Comète et Simiot 7–2 in the final at Camp de la Indústria.

== Participants ==
Originally, the tournament was to be contested by 7 teams, however, the 1912–13 season saw a split in Spanish football, with several Spanish teams led by Barcelona and Real Sociedad, announcing their departure from the Federación Española de Clubs de Fútbol (FECF) (the forerunner for the Royal Spanish Football Federation, RFEF) and created a new institution, the Unión Española de Clubs de Fútbol (UECF). Of the Catalan clubs registered at the tournament, RCD Espanyol, FC Espanya and Casual SC were loyal to the original institutions (FECF), questioning whether teams from different federations (such as Barça from UECF) could participate in the same international competition, and eventually, FC Espanya did not accept the entry of FC Barcelona and forfeited the match against RCD Espanyol, who together with Casual SC decided to participate in spite of Barcelona's entry. Interestingly, the Catalan Football Federation penalized Casual SC for playing against FC Barcelona, but not RCD Espanyol.

Teams	Town
Stade toulousain	Midi-Pyrénées
Olympique de Cette	Languedoc
Comète et Simiot	Côte d'Argent
Cercle pédestre d'Asnières	Aquitaine
FC Barcelona	Catalonia
RCD Espanyol	Catalonia
Casual SC	Catalonia
FC Espanya	Catalonia (withdrew)

== Tournament ==
FC Barcelona won the tournament after thrashing Casual SC 7–0 in the quarter-finals with a hat-trick from Alexander Steel, and then La Comète et Simiot 7–2 in the final with goals from José Berdié (2), Paulino Alcántara (2) and Alfredo Massana. However, their triumph was wrapped up in controversy as they actually lost the semi-finals 1–3 to RCD Espanyol, courtesy of a brace from Antonio Morales, a former Barça player; but the Blaugrana managed to have the result being annulled through protests about the improper use of British players.

=== Results ===
Quarter-finals
30 March - Barcelona
(Catalonia) FC Barcelona	7
(Catalonia) Casual SC	0
16 March - Barcelona
(Catalonia) RCD Espanyol
(Catalonia) FC Espanya
2 March - Bordeaux
(Bordeaux) La Comète et Simiot	4
(Toulouse) Stade toulousain	3
(Languedoc) Olympique de Cette

Semi-finals
6 April - Barcelona
(Catalonia) FC Barcelona	1
~~(Catalonia) RCD Espanyol~~	3
6 April - Toulouse
(Bordeaux) La Comète et Simiot
(Languedoc) Olympique de Cette

Final
8 June – Barcelona
(Catalonia) FC Barcelona	7
(Bordeaux) La Comète et Simiot	2

=== Quarter-finals ===
30 March 1913

FC Barcelona	7 - 0	Casual SC
Steel; Allack; Apolinario	Report

Camp de la Indústria, Barcelona
Referee: Nandy
16 March 1913

RCD Espanyol	Awarded to Espanyol	FC Espanya
	Report

Velòdrom Parc de Sports, Barcelona

2 March 1913
14:30

La Comète et Simiot	4 - 3	Stade toulousain
?	Report	?

Chemin des Ecus, Bordeaux

=== Semi-final ===
6 April 1913
15:55

FC Barcelona	1 - 3	RCD Espanyol
Greenwell	Report1; Report2	Amechazurra ?' (o.g.); Morales

Camp de la Indústria, Barcelona
Referee: Nandy

Barcelona played the second half with 10 players due to a tackle by S. Massana on Steel that prevented him from continuing to play, and Espanyol took full advantage of it to win 3–1, thus becoming the first team in the history of the competition to beat Barcelona, but Barça protested against the fact that Espanyol had fielded three British players brought by them from the United Kingdom only to play the match, and their protest was upheld resulting in Espanyol being disqualified and FC Barcelona reaching the final yet again.

6 April 1913

La Comète et Simiot	Awarded to Comète	Olympique de Cette
	Report

Ponts-Jumeaux, Toulouse

=== Final ===
8 June 1913
16:30

FC Barcelona	7 - 2	Cométe et Simot
Berdié 10' ?'; Alcántara ?' ?'; Forns ?'; Allack ?'; Massana ?'	Report1; Report2	Sandoval; Berrondo ?' (o.g.)

Camp de la Indústria, Barcelona
Referee: Nandy

== Statistics ==
=== Top Scorers ===
Rank	Player	Team	Goals
1	Alexander Steel	FC Barcelona	3
2	Paulino Alcántara	FC Barcelona	2
2	Apolinario Rodríguez	FC Barcelona	2
2	Frank Allack	FC Barcelona	2
2	José Berdié	FC Barcelona	2
2	Antonio Morales	RCD Espanyol	2

Source: RSSSF

== See also ==
- 1895 World Championship
- 1900 Coupe Van der Straeten Ponthoz
- 1909 Sir Thomas Lipton Trophy
