= José María Rodilla =

Spanish footballer (born 1940)

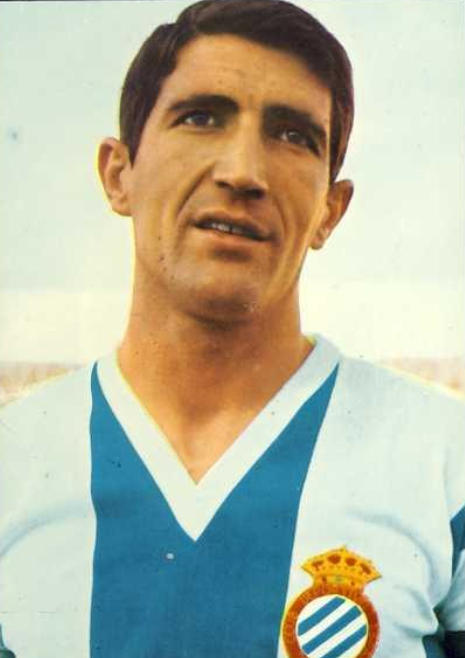
- Rodilla with Deportivo La Coruña

Personal information
- Full name: José María Sánchez Rodilla
- Date of birth: 10 October 1940 (age 86)
- Place of birth: Fuentes de Béjar, Castile and León, Spain
- Height: 1.74 m (5 ft 9 in)
- Position: Forward

Youth career
- Racing Ballesteros

Senior career*
| Years | Team | Apps | (Gls) |
| 1959–1960 | Salamanca | | |
| 1960–1964 | Real Valladolid | 70 | (31) |
| 1964–1971 | RCD Espanyol | 159 | (44) |
| 1971–1972 | San Andrés | 26 | (2) |

International career
| 1970 | Spain | 1 | (0) |
- * Club domestic league appearances and goals

José María Sánchez Rodilla (born 10 October 1940) is a Spanish retired footballer. Nicknamed "Josema" or known simply as Rodilla, he played as a forward for Real Valladolid and RCD Espanyol.

== Club career ==
Rodilla would begin his career by playing for Racing Ballesteros de Salamanca and UD Salamanca throughout his youth. After playing for other local clubs within Salamanca including C.D. Salmantino, U.S. Salamanca, and finally with Unión Deportiva Salamanca for the 1959–60 Tercera División after being recommended by Jesús Rivero as an amateur as he was a relatively inexpensive player. He would make his debut for Real Valladolid in the 1960–61 La Liga. During his initial career with the club, he would become the top scorer for Valladolid in the 1962–63 La Liga. He would play for the club until the 1963–64 La Liga as in the following season, he would play for RCD Espanyol alongside Alfredo Di Stéfano. During his tenure with the club, he would play as a left winger with his positioning often leaning very forward. He would play alongside players such as Cayetano Ré, Carmelo Amas, Marcial Pina and José María known collectively as the "Cinco Delfines". Despite his contributions to the club including 44 goals, he would initially remain a largely obscure player in comparison to his peers before receiving recognition in subsequent years.

He would play for the club until the 1970–71 La Liga as for his final season, he would play for San Andrés in the 1971–72 Segunda División before retiring following the season. Following his retirement, he would move to Barcelona to become a lawyer. As a gift for his 80th birthday, he would receive a customized jersey by his former club of Espanyol.

== International career ==
He would play for Spain in one match in 1970.
