= Mariano Arrate =

Spanish footballer

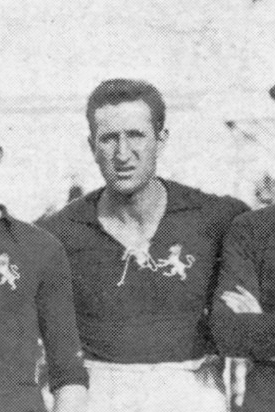
- Mariano Arrate with the Spain National Team in 1923

Medal record

Men's football

Representing Spain

Olympic Games
Silver medal – second place	1920 Antwerp	Team competition

José Mariano Arrate Esnaola (12 August 1892 (Note: Some sources state that he was born on 5 October 1896.) – 24 December 1963) was a Spanish football (soccer) player who competed in the 1920 Summer Olympics. He was a member of the Spanish team which won the silver medal in the football tournament.

He was born and died in San Sebastián, and worked as a crane driver in the city's docks. He played for Luchana from 1908 to 1909, San Sebastián (later Real Sociedad B) from 1909 to 1911, and Real Sociedad from 1911 to 1924. He featured on the losing side in the 1913 UECF Copa del Rey Final (lost to FC Barcelona after two replays). He played alongside two younger brothers, Amador and José Miguel, in both legs of a 1919 Copa del Rey quarter-final loss to the same opposition.

In addition to six official caps for Spain between 1920 and 1923, Arrate also took part in the national team's first unofficial game in 1913, a 1–1 draw with France.
