= José Berrondo =

Spanish footballer (1890–1936)

Personal information
- Full name: José Berrondo Silva
- Date of birth: 26 October 1890
- Place of birth: Bilbao, Biscay, Spain
- Date of death: 21 August 1936 (aged 45)
- Place of death: Canet d'en Berenguer, Valencian Community, Spain
- Position: Defender

Senior career*
Years	Team	Apps	(Gls)
1911–1912	Hispania FC		
1912–1913	FC Barcelona		
1913–1914	Espanyol		
- Sarrià SC
1919–1923	Valencia CF		
1924–1925	Sporting de Sagunto		
- * Club domestic league appearances and goals

José Berrondo Silva (26 October 1890 – 21 August 1936) was a Spanish footballer who played as a defender for FC Barcelona and Espanyol. He was also a referee and a Basque pelota player.

== Biography ==
José Berrondo was born in Bilbao, but it was in Valencian Community where he began to play football, joining his hometown club Hispania FC during the 1911–12 season, before signing for FC Barcelona in the following season. In his only season at Barcelona (1912–13), Berrondo won the Copa del Rey and the Pyrenees Cup. Barça needed three games to beat Real Sociedad in the Copa del Rey final, and he only featured in the second game as a substitute to the injured José Irízar, helping his side keep a clean-sheet in a goalless draw. He also played in the Pyrenees Cup final, this time as a starter, netting an own goal in a 7–2 victory over Cométe et Simot.

Berrondo then moved to Espanyol and ended his career at the end of the 1913–14 season. He immediately began refereeing matches, and although he played briefly for Sarrià SC during this period, he also became a Basque ball player, a sport in which he also succeeded.

Five years later, in 1919, the 29-year-old José Berrondo reversed his decision to retire and returned to Valencia to join Valencia CF's reserve team, making his debut with the first team on 14 May 1920 against FC Cartagena. His role in the first team was limited to just some friendly matches and in the Levante Regional Championship, featuring alongside the likes of Eduardo Cubells and Arturo Montesinos, and winning the Regional title in 1923. He also had a brief spell with Sporting de Sagunto (1924–25) with whom he retired permanently. He went on to become the honorary president of Sporting de Sagunto.

== Death ==
During the Spanish Civil War, he was shot dead at the gates of the Canet de Berenguer cemetery on 21 August 1936, at the age of 45.

== Honours ==
Barcelona

- Pyrenees Cup:
  - Champions (1): 1913
- Copa del Rey:
  - Champions (1): 1913

Valencia

- Levante Regional Championship:
  - Winners (1) 1922–23
