= Frank Allack =

English footballer

Personal information
- Full name: Frank Albert Allack
- Date of birth: 25 September 1888
- Place of birth: Woolwich, London, England
- Date of death: 1967 (aged 78-79)
- Place of death: Woolwich, England
- Position: Forward

Senior career*
Years	Team	Apps	(Gls)
- Plumstead FC
- Catford Southend
1911–1912	RCD Espanyol		
1912–1914	FC Barcelona		
1914	Català SC		
- * Club domestic league appearances and goals

Frank Albert Allack (25 September 1888 – 1967) was an English footballer who played as a forward for Spanish clubs RCD Espanyol and FC Barcelona. The highlight of his career was winning the treble with Barcelona in the 1912–13 season (Catalan championship, Copa del Rey and Pyrenees Cup), netting a goal in the final of the 1913 Pyrenees Cup.

== Biography ==
Born in Woolwich, he began to play football in England for Plumstead FC and then Catford Southend. Allack toured Catalonia with the former, and in a match against RCD Espanyol on 18 May 1911, he put up a great performance which impressed the Catalan club enough for them to sign him, along with William Hodge and Raine Gibson. He had an immediate impact in Espanyol, quickly becoming one of the club's most important players and playing a pivotal role in helping his side win the 1911–12 Catalan championship, thus interrupting a three-year dominace of FC Barcelona.

His great season at Espanyol earned him a move to FC Barcelona in 1912, where he played for two seasons. He again had a great first impact on the team, helping Barça win all the titles at stake in his first season with them (1912–13): The Catalan championship, Copa del Rey and Pyrenees Cup, and he was one of the most outstanding players in the latter tournament, being its shared top scorer (alongside Alexander Steel) with 3 goals, two in a 7–0 win over Casual SC in the quarter-finals and one in the final to help his side to a 7–2 win over Cométe et Simot. He later played for Català SC before retiring in 1914.

His brother, Henry Thomas Allack, was also a footballer and played in Catalonia for Olot Deportiu, Sporting Club Olotí, CE Manresa and Terrassa FC.

== Honours ==
=== Club ===
RCD Espanyol

- Catalan championship:
  - Champions (1): 1911–12

FC Barcelona

- Catalan championship:
  - Champions (1): 1912–13
- Copa del Rey:
  - Champions (1): 1913
- Pyrenees Cup:
  - Champions (1): 1913
