= Walter Rositzky =

German footballer

Personal information
- Full name: Walter Cäsar Max Rositzky
- Date of birth: 16 March 1889
- Place of birth: Hamburg, Germany
- Date of death: 26 May 1953 (aged 64)
- Place of death: Hamburg, Germany
- Position: Midfielder

Senior career*
Years	Team	Apps	(Gls)
- Ottensen 07
1911–1912	FC Barcelona B	22	(4)
1912–1913	Barcelona B	23	(0)
1913–1914	Real Madrid	4	(0)
- * Club domestic league appearances and goals

Walter Rositzky (16 March 1889 – 26 May 1953) was a footballer who played as a midfielder or forward. He played for FC Barcelona and Real Madrid.

== Club career ==
Rositzky was born in Hamburg, Germany. "Rositzky", as it appears in his German military record Landesarchiv Baden-Württemberg, Abt. Generallandesarchiv Karlsruhe, 456 E Nr. 9851, was a midfielder and right winger. He played for FC Barcelona in from 1911 to 1913 before leaving it to play for Real Madrid.

Rositzky was the fifth player in history who left the Catalans for Madrid. In the shirt of the Blaugrana he played 55 games and scored 5 goals, won the club championship of Catalonia, and won twice the King's Cup and the Pyrenees Cup. He remained in Madrid until 1915, when the outbreak of World War I suspended his career. He left Spain, was drafted into the German army and never returned to the Iberian Peninsula, locating himself in his native town of Hamburg in 1920.

Rositzky was engaged in trade and owned a margarine company. He survived World War II and ran a grocery shop at 54 Rotbuchenstieg between 1949 and 1952. There is no documentation that he had a wife or children. Walter Rositzky died on 26 May 1953 in Hamburg.

== International affiliation ==
During the time in which he played professionally, he was commonly misspelled as "Rozitsky" and referred to be born in Poland, despite it was not a sovereign nation. At the Estadio Santiago Bernabéu in the gallery of all the Real Madrid players, he was also inscribed as a Polonia player (meaning Polish).
