= José Berdié =

Spanish footballer

Personal information
- Full name: José Berdié Places
- Birth name: Josep Berdié
- Date of birth: 1887
- Place of birth: Tamarite de Litera, Huesca, Spain
- Date of death: 31 January 1931 (aged 43–44)
- Place of death: Barcelona, Catalonia
- Position: Midfielder

Senior career*
Years	Team	Apps	(Gls)
1904	Ibèric FC		
1904–1909	X Sporting Club		
1909–1911	Espanyol		
1911–1914	FC Barcelona	21	(0)

International career
1910	Catalonia	3	(1)
- * Club domestic league appearances and goals

José Berdié Places (1887 – 31 January 1931), sometimes written as Verdié, was a Spanish footballer who played as a midfielder for Espanyol and FC Barcelona. With the latter side, he won one Catalan championship (1913), and two titles in both the Copa del Rey and the Pyrenees Cup (1912 and 1913).

== Club career ==
Born in Huesca, Berdié joined the first team of Ibèric FC during the 1903–04 season, featuring alongside the likes of Pedro Gibert and Santiago Massana, and they also were teammates at X Sporting Club and RCD Espanyol. For the former side, he played a crucial role in helping the club win the Catalan championship three times in a row between 1906 and 1908. In 1909, the club was effectively relaunched as the Club Deportivo Español, the name which still stands today. He remained loyal to the club until 1911, when his regular good performances drew the attention of FC Barcelona, who signed him in 1911.

He was a member of the legendary Barcelona team of the early 1910s that also included the likes of Francisco Bru, Alfredo Massana, Enrique Peris and Carles Comamala, which won back-to-back Copa del Rey titles in 1912 and 1913. In the latter final, Barcelona needed three games to beat Real Sociedad, and Berdié scored in the third game (2–1) to help the Catalans win the title. He also helped the Catalan club win the Catalan Championships in 1912–13, and two Pyrenees Cups titles in 1912 and 1913, scoring twice in the final of the latter against Cométe et Simot in an eventual 7–2 victory. He played for Barcelona until he retired in 1914.

In total, Berdié played 36 games with the Barcelona team and scored 24 goals.

== International career ==
On 18 November 1909, Berdié made his international debut at the Camp de la Indústria, on the occasion of a benefit match for the injured people in the Second Melillan campaign, starting for Equip Blanc (White Team) alongside the likes of Francisco Bru, Emilio Sampere, and the Comamala brothers (Carles and Arsenio), and helping his side to a 6–2 victory over the Catalan national team, which marked Catalonia's first match after a three-year hiatus.

Like many other FC Barcelona players of that time, Berdié was eligible to play for the Catalan national team, doing so on three occasions in 1910, including two matches in March against FC Maonès at Mahón, scoring the opening goal of the first match in an eventual 7–0 victory. On 24 July 1910, Berdié went down in history as one of the eleven footballers who played in Catalonia's first-ever international game (although not recognized by FIFA), which ended in a 1–3 loss to a Paris XI.

== Honours ==
=== Club ===
X Sporting Club

Catalan championship:

- Champions (3): 1905–06, 1906–07, 1907–08

Barcelona

- Catalan championships
  - Champions (1): 1912–13
- Copa del Rey:
  - Champions (2): 1912 and 1913
- Pyrenees Cup:
  - Champions (2): 1912 and 1913
