= Apolinario Rodríguez =

Spanish footballer

Personal information
- Full name: Antonio Morales Veloso
- Date of birth: 1 October 1892
- Place of birth: Laguna, Canary Islands, Spain
- Date of death: 28 October 1972 (aged 80)
- Place of death: Madrid, Spain
- Position: Forward

Senior career*
Years	Team	Apps	(Gls)
1911–1912	Sociedad Gimnástica		
1912–1913	FC Barcelona		
1913–1914	Universitary SC		
- * Club domestic league appearances and goals

Alejandro Rodríguez Apolinario (1 October 1892 - 28 October 1972) was a Spanish footballer who played as a forward for FC Barcelona. The highlight of his career was winning the treble with Barcelona in the 1912–13 season (Catalan championship, Copa del Rey and Pyrenees Cup), in which he contributed with the winning goal of the 1913 UECF Copa del Rey Final against Real Sociedad.

== Club career ==
He began his career in 1911 with Sociedad Gimnástica, featuring alongside the likes of José Carruana, José Manuel Kindelán and Sócrates Quintana, and forming a dynamic attacking partnership with Antonio Morales, however, the latter was signed by FC Barcelona in the middle of the 1911–12 season, in February, which was a great setback for the club, but despite his partner's departure, Apolinario was still able to help Gimnástica reach the 1912 Copa del Rey Final, which still is the club's only cup final appearance, and interestingly, it was Barça who they faced, and in the end, it was Morales' side who won (2–0). The silver lining was that his performance in the final impressed the Catalan club enough for them to sign him in the summer, replacing none other than Morales, who had been signed by RCD Espanyol.

In his only season at Barcelona (1912–13), Apolinario won all the titles at stake: The Catalan championship, Copa del Rey and Pyrenees Cup. He was fundamental in Barça's triumph in the Copa del Rey Final, netting two goals against Real Sociedad in the final, one in the first leg as they tied at 2, and then the winning goal in the replay to secure the title with a 2–1 win (the other goal was scored by José Berdié). He then moved to University SC, finishing his career at the end of the season.

== Retirement ==
During the Second Spanish Republic, he was a candidate in the elections of February 1936 for the center party in the province of Las Palmas, but he was not elected.

== Honours ==
Sociedad Gimnástica

- Copa del Rey:
  - Runner-up (1): 1912

Barcelona

- Catalan championship:
  - Champions (1): 1912–13
- Pyrenees Cup:
  - Champions (1): 1913
- Copa del Rey:
  - Champions (1): 1913
