= Alex Steel =

Scottish footballer

Personal information
- Full name: Alexander Steel
- Date of birth: 25 July 1886
- Place of birth: Newmilns, Scotland
- Date of death: 1954 (aged 67–68)
- Place of death: St Albans, England
- Position: Right half

Senior career*
| Years | Team | Apps | (Gls) |
- Newmilns
- Ayr
| 1905–1908 | Manchester City | 30 | (1) |
| 1908–1911 | Tottenham Hotspur | 1 | (0) |
| 1911 | Kilmarnock | 3 | (0) |
| 1912–1913 | Barcelona | | |
- Southend United
| 1919–1920 | Gillingham | 23 | (0) |
- * Club domestic league appearances and goals

Alexander Steel (25 July 1886 – 1954) was a Scottish professional footballer who played for Newmilns, Ayr, Manchester City, Tottenham Hotspur, Barcelona, Kilmarnock, Southend United and Gillingham. In his spell at Barcelona he won two Pyrenees Cups in 1912 and 1913.

== Football career ==
Steel began his career at local non-league club Newmilns before joining Ayr. In 1905 he joined Manchester City and made 32 league and FA Cup appearances for the Hyde Road club, scoring only once. The right half signed for Tottenham Hotspur in 1908 and played in one first-team match in his three years with Spurs.

After playing a few games back in his native Ayrshire with Kilmarnock, (Note: The FitbaStats website attributes appearances in three seasons at Kilmarnock to 'Steel, ?' which would clash with the time in Barcelona, but the Litster files attribute only the 1911 matches to Alex and the others to James Steel.) Steel joined FC Barcelona during the 1911–12 season and quickly became one of the club's benchmarks, netting 56 goals in just 43 matches. At Barça he won two Pyrenees Cups in 1912 and 1913, scoring once in the quarter-finals of the former and netting a hat-trick in the quarter-finals of the latter, and even though he did not found the back of the net again in the 1913 edition, his hat-trick alone was enough to make him the tournament's shared top scorer alongside Frank Allack. After leaving Barcelona he had spells in England at Southend United and finally Gillingham, where he played the 1919–20 Southern Football League season as a defender before ending his playing career.

His brothers Danny and Bobby were also footballers, both having a significant association with Tottenham Hotspur; the three siblings played together in one Football League fixture against Bradford City in January 1910, Alex's only league appearance for the club. Alex later recommended Bobby as a signing for Gillingham.

== Honours ==
Barcelona

- Pyrenees Cup: 1912, 1913
