= 1913 Copa del Rey =

The 1913 Copa del Rey comprised two different competitions held the same year.

Due to disagreements between the Federación Española de Clubs de Football (FECF), forerunner of the Royal Spanish Football Federation (Spanish: Real Federación Española de Fútbol, RFEF) and some clubs, in 1913 two parallel competitions were held: an "official", organized by the FECF (Federación Española de Clubs de Football), in Madrid and an "unofficial", organized by the UECF (Unión Española de Clubes de Fútbol), in Barcelona. Both are currently recognized as official by the RFEF.

== Copa FECF (Federación Española de Clubs de Football) ==
1913 Copa FECF
12th Copa del Rey

Tournament details
- Country: Spain
- Teams: 5

Final positions
- Champions: Racing de Irún (1st title)
- Runners-up: Athletic de Bilbao

Tournament statistics
- Matches played: 5
- Goals scored: 10 (2 per match)
- Top goal scorer(s): Pichichi (3 goals)

The competition started on 16 March 1913 and concluded on 23 March 1913 with the replay of the final (FEF), held at the O'Donell, Madrid, in which Racing de Irún lifted the trophy for the first time ever with a 1–0 victory over Athletic Bilbao, with the only goal of the match being scored by Manuel Retegui.

=== Preliminary round ===
16 March 1913

España FC	1–0	Vigo FC
Olivé 20'	Report

Estadio O'Donnell, Madrid
Referee: José Manuel Kindelán

=== Semifinals ===
17 March 1913

Athletic Bilbao	3–0	Madrid FC
Pichichi 2', 11'; Luis Cortadi 53'	Report

Estadio O'Donnell, Madrid
Referee: (Spain) Baldomero Martínez

18 March 1913

Racing de Irún	1–0	España FC
Patricio 60'	Report

Estadio O'Donnell, Madrid
Referee: (Spain) Manuel Prast

=== Final ===
22 March 1913

Racing de Irún	2–2 (a.e.t.)	Athletic Bilbao
Patricio 10'; Manuel Retegui 20'	Report	Pichichi 30'; Belauste II 47'

Estadio O'Donnell, Madrid
Referee: (Spain) Santiago Rodríguez

=== Replay ===
23 March 1913
15:30 (EST)

Racing de Irún	1–0	Athletic Bilbao
Manuel Retegui 70'

Estadio O'Donnell, Madrid
Referee: (Spain) Manuel Prast

Copa del Rey 1913 winners (FECF)
Racing de Irún
1st title

== Copa UECF (Unión Española de Clubes de Football) ==
1913 Copa UECF
13th Copa del Rey

Tournament details
- Country: Spain
- Teams: 3

Final positions
- Champions: FC Barcelona (3rd title)
- Runners-up: Real Sociedad

Tournament statistics
- Matches played: 3
- Goals scored: 7 (2.33 per match)
- Top goal scorer(s): Apolinario Rodríguez (2 goals)

Three teams were going to take part in the tournament, but Auténtico Pontevedra FC withdrew before the start of the tournament, and due to its absence, it was agreed for a second match to be played between FC Barcelona and Real Sociedad, elucidating the title to a two-legged final. Both legs ended in draws (2–2 and 0–0), thus forcing a play-off in which Barça lifted the trophy with a 2–1, thanks to first-half goals from José Berdié and Apolinario Rodríguez.

=== First leg ===
16 March 1913

Real Sociedad	2–2	FC Barcelona
Domingo Arrillaga 15'; Juan Artola 89'	Report	Romà Forns 49'; Apolinario Rodríguez 69'

Camp de la Indústria, Barcelona
Referee: (Spain) Eugenio Angosto

=== Second leg ===
17 March 1913

FC Barcelona	0–0	Real Sociedad
	Report

Camp de la Indústria, Barcelona
Referee: (Spain) Eugenio Angosto

=== Final ===
23 March 1913

FC Barcelona	2–1	Real Sociedad
José Berdié 33'; Apolinario Rodríguez 35'	Report	Manuel Rezola 12' (pen.)

Camp de la Indústria, Barcelona
Referee: (Spain) Eugenio Angosto

Copa del Rey 1913 winners (UECF)
FC Barcelona
3rd title
