= Camp de la Indústria =

Stadium in Barcelona, Spain (1909–1922)

- L'Escopidora
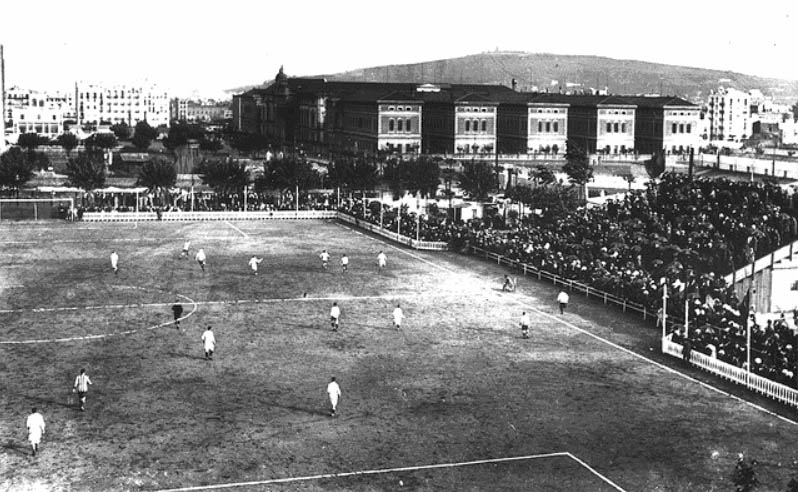
- The Camp during a football match
- Interactive map of Camp de la Indústria
- Full name: Campo de la calle Indústria
- Location: Barcelona, Catalonia, Spain
- Coordinates: 41.39°N 2.15°E
- Capacity: 6,000

Construction
- Opened: March 14, 1909
- Closed: 1922; 104 years ago

Tenant
- FC Barcelona (1909–1922)

Camp de la Indústria (Catalan pronunciation: [ˈkam də lə inˈdustɾiə]) or Campo de la calle Indústria was a multi-use stadium in Barcelona, Spain. It was initially used as the home venue of FC Barcelona, until the team moved to Camp de Les Corts in 1922. The capacity of the stadium was 6,000 spectators. The stadium is regarded as the main element that helped the club grow in the 1910s.

== Overview ==
The stadium was opened during the presidency of Joan Gamper, who had returned as president of FC Barcelona one year before. The club had serious financial problems with significant debts by then, but Gamper got the help of local businessman to acquire the first field at Calle de la Industria. The ground was inaugurated on March 14, 1909, with a match v Catalá SC. The stadium, the first with grandstands, was considered the best in the city. With an initial capacity of 1,500 spectators, in 1916 it increased to 6,000. Paulino Alcántara, regarded as the first outstanding player of Barcelona, made his debut at Camp de la Indústria, with only 15 years old.

The successful campaigns of the team caused the stadium to be overwhelmed every time Barcelona played there, so much of its supporters had to sit over the edge of the wall, which earned them the nickname culés (in Spanish, an informal way to refer to buttocks). That nickname was so popular that the Barça fans proudly adopted it, calling themselves like that even when the club moved to its new stadium, Camp de Les Corts in 1922.

== Gallery ==
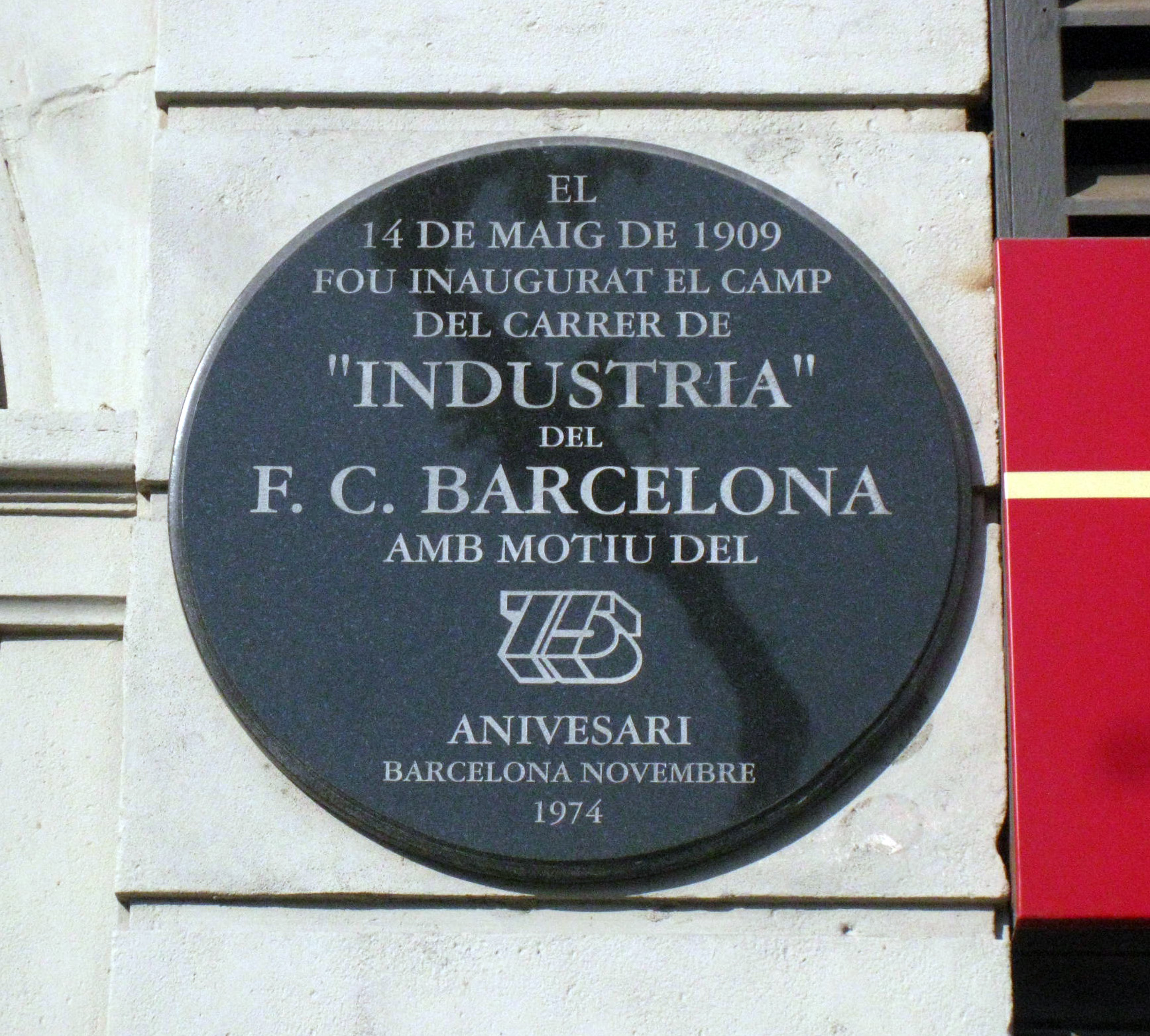
Inaugural plaque.

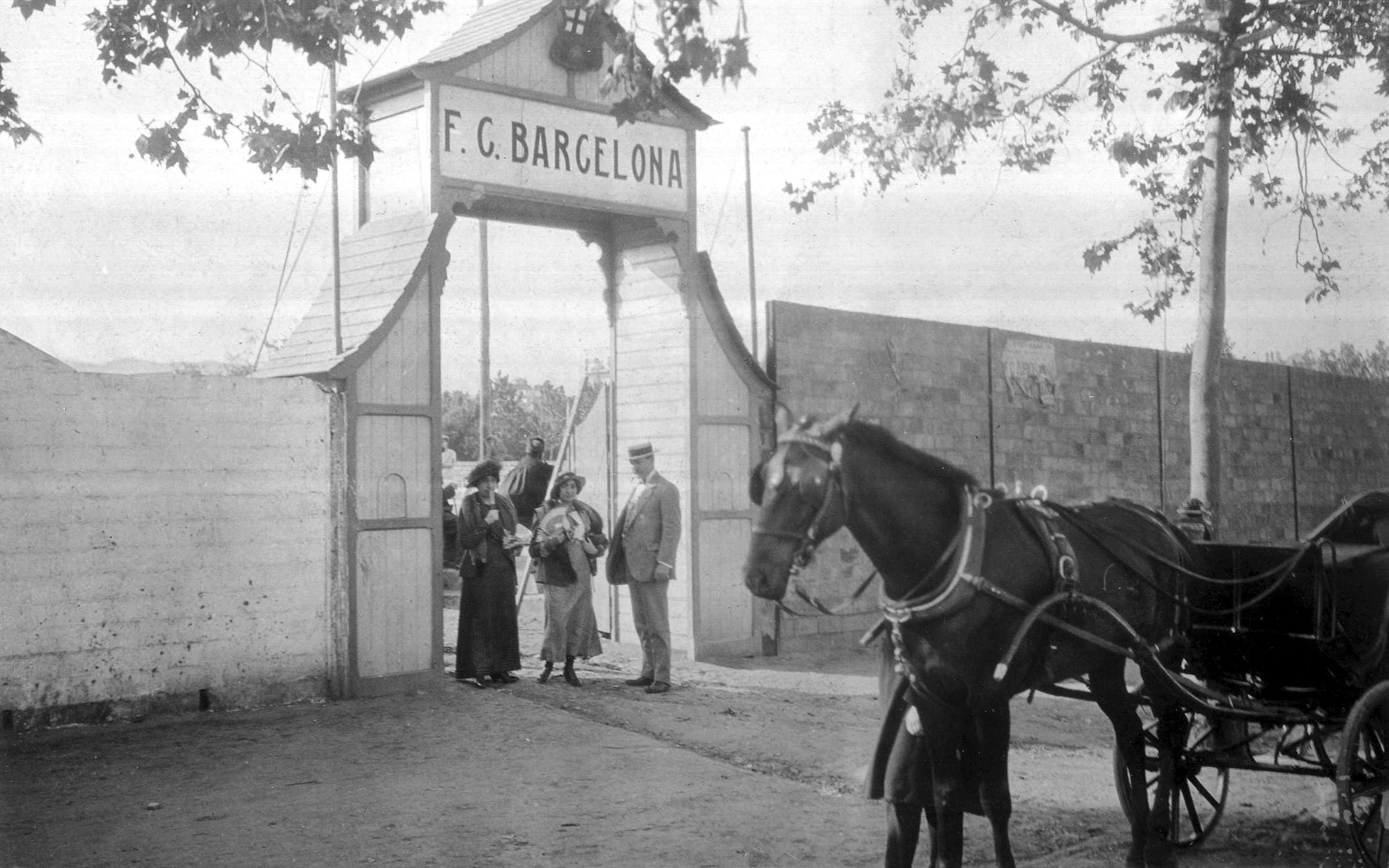
Entrance.

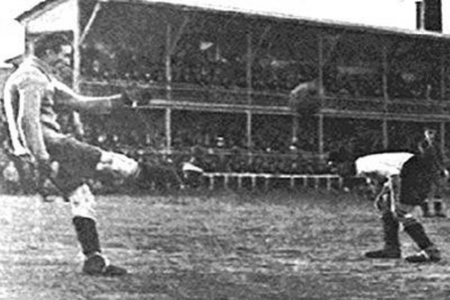
Grandstand in 1908.

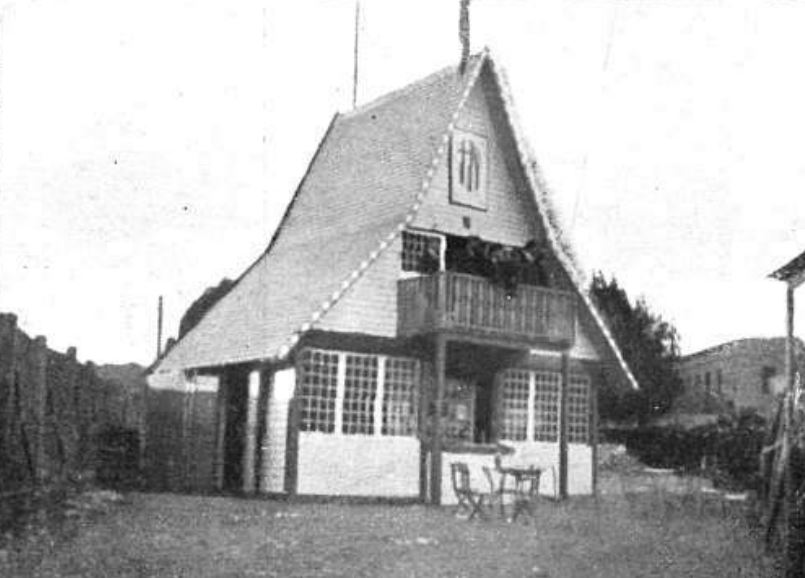
Hut of the FC Barcelona.

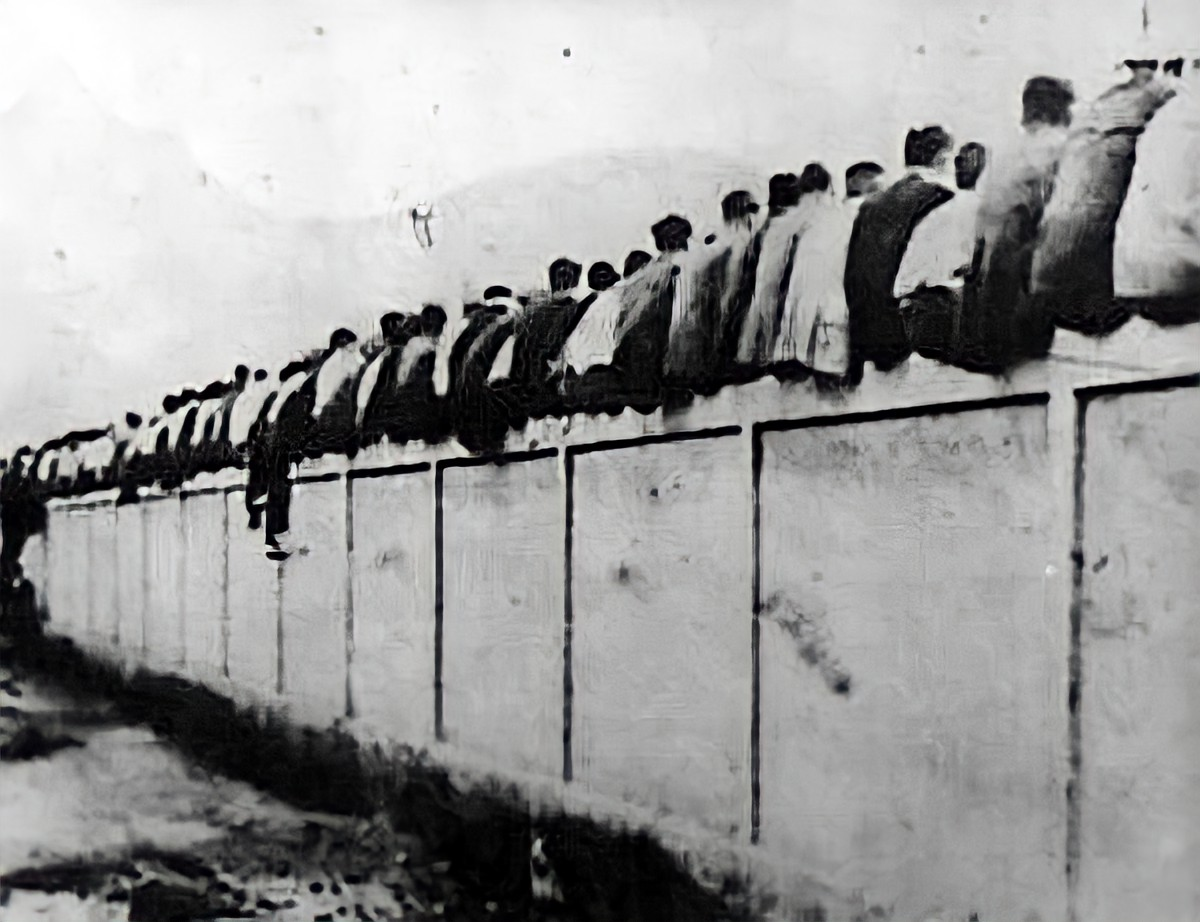
Culés (buttocks) sitting over the edge of the wall.
