= 1916–17 FC Barcelona season =

18th season in existence of FC Barcelona

FC Barcelona
1916–17 season
- President: Gaspar Rosés
- Manager: Jack Greenwell
- Catalan football championship: Third

The 1916–17 season was the 18th season for FC Barcelona.

== Season highlights ==
- Two players debuted with the team, and left their mark: Agustin Sancho and Emilio Sagi Liñán.
- The Garchitorena scandal exploded when FC Barcelona included a foreign player Juan Garchitorena in their lineup for the Catalan football championship, where foreigners were not allowed to play. Team RCD Espanyol claimed Torena had U.S. citizenship (although in all the confusion, it was later claimed he was Argentinian), since the Philippines was a territory of the United States at that time; but they only reported it after losing to Barcelona (3-0). A redo of all the matches including this player was ordered, but the club preferred to withdraw. Garchitorena ended up getting involved with cinema, moving to Hollywood and having various liaisons, including one with actress Myrna Loy.
- On 17 June 1917 club founder Joan Gamper regained the presidency of the club for the third time.

== Player roster ==
P	Player	Ctry	PT	fb gols
GOL	Luis Bru	(Catalonia)	12	-10
GOL	Francisco Conforto	(Spain)	0	
DEF	Eduardo Reguera	(Catalonia)	12	
DEF	Josep Costaca	(Catalonia)	12	5
DEF	Joan Pedret	(Catalonia)	1	
DEF	Lluís Tudó	(Catalonia)	0	
DEF	Jack Greenwell	(England)	0	
DEF	Joan Barba	(Catalonia)	0	
DEF	Dimas Fernández	(Catalonia)	0	
MID	Francisco Baonza	(Spain)	12	1
MID	Agustin Sancho		12	3
MID	Ramón Torralba	(Spain)	6	
MID	Jaume Amat	(Catalonia)	5	
MID	Rodríguez	(Catalonia)	3	1
MID	Pere Llobet	(Catalonia)	3	1
FWD	Francisco Vinyals	(Catalonia)	11	
FWD	Vicente Martínez (footballer)	(Catalonia)	9	8
FWD	Salvador Hormeu	(Catalonia)	10	5
FWD	Augusto Ozores	(Puerto Rico)	9	
FWD	Juan Garchitorena	(Philippines)	6	2
FWD	A. Castells	(Catalonia)	5	1
FWD	Francesc Serrats	(Catalonia)	3	1
FWD	Francisco Castelló	(Catalonia)	1	
FWD	Ernest Rovira	(Catalonia)	0	
FWD	Emilio Sagi Liñán	(Catalonia)	0	
FWD	Casimiro Mallorquí	(Catalonia)	0	
FWD	José Julià	(Catalonia)	0	
FWD	Enrique Peris	(Catalonia)	0	
FWD	Agustin Bó	(Catalonia)	0	
FWD	Joaquim Alfaro	(Catalonia)	0	

== Results ==
Friendly games

27 August 1916	FC Barcelona	1 - 1	RCD Espanyol	Barcelona
	Garchitorena			Stadium: Internacional; Referee: Palomera

10 September 1916	Arenas Club de Getxo	4 - 0	FC Barcelona	Bilbao
				Stadium: Josaleta; Referee: Vidal

12 September 1916	Arenas Club de Getxo	3 - 3	FC Barcelona	Bilbao
			V.Martínez; Hormeu	Stadium: Josaleta; Referee: Ibarreche

24 September 1916	CF Badalona	2 - 0	FC Barcelona	Barcelona
				Stadium: Badalona; Referee: Ramirez

6 October 1916	FC Barcelona	1 - 2	Real Fortuna Foot-ball Club	Barcelona
	Rovira			Stadium: Industria; Referee: Greenwell

8 October 1916	FC Barcelona	1 - 1	Real Fortuna Foot-ball Club	Barcelona
	Ozores			Stadium: Industria; Referee: Bru

15 October 1916	FC Barcelona	2 - 3	Terrassa FC	Barcelona
	Martinez; Vinyals			Stadium: Industria; Referee: Ponz

22 October 1916	FC Barcelona	2 - 1	CF Badalona	Barcelona
	Martinez			Stadium: Industria; Referee: Bru

29 October 1916	FC Barcelona	4 - 0	Athletic Bilbao	Barcelona
	Hormeu; Martinez; Ozores			Stadium: Industria; Referee: Palomera

1 November 1916	FC Barcelona	1 - 3	Athletic Bilbao	Barcelona
	Ozores			Stadium: Industria; Referee: Forns

12 November 1916	RCD Espanyol	1 - 2	FC Barcelona	Barcelona
			Martinez	Stadium: Espanyol; Referee: Bru primera part i Julines segona part

8 December 1916	FC Barcelona	4 - 2	Deportivo de La Coruña	Barcelona
	Caballal equip contrari Ozores; Serrats			Stadium: Industria; Referee: Marti

9 December 1916	Athletic Bilbao	9 - 1	FC Barcelona	Bilbao
			Rovira	Stadium: San Mames; Referee: Pacheco

10 December 1916	FC Barcelona	3 - 2	Deportivo de La Coruña	Barcelona
	Ozores; Castells; Sagi			Stadium: Industria; Referee: Marti

11 December 1916	Athletic Bilbao	8 - 0	FC Barcelona	Bilbao
				Stadium: San Mames; Referee: Arzuaga

24 December 1916	FC Barcelona	3 - 1	Fussballclub Basel 1893	Barcelona
15:00	Garchitorena; Hormeu	Basel Summary	Haas	Stadium: Camp de la Indústria; Attendance: 4,000; Referee: Bru

26 December 1916	FC Barcelona	1 - 3	Fussballclub Basel 1893	Barcelona
15:00	Garchitorena	Basel Summary	(1:1) Wüthrich (1:2) Albicker (I) (1:3) Wüthrich	Stadium: Camp de la Indústria; Referee: Hamilton

31 December 1916	FC Barcelona	1 - 1	FC La Chaux-de-Fonds	Barcelona
	Garchitorena			Stadium: Industria; Referee: Peris

1 January 1917	FC Barcelona	3 - 1	FC La Chaux-de-Fonds	Barcelona
	Garchitorena; Hormeu			Stadium: Industria; Referee: Marti

28 January 1917	FC Barcelona	3 - 0	FC Stadium	Barcelona
	Sagi; Serrats			Stadium: Industria; Referee: Jack Greenwell

4 February 1917	FC Barcelona	6 - 2	Terrassa FC	Barcelona
	Costa; Vinyals; Hormeu; Castells equip contrari			Stadium: Industria; Referee: Torras

11 February 1917	FC Barcelona	2 - 1	UE Sants	Barcelona
	Bonet			Stadium: Industria; Referee: Torras

18 March 1917	FC Barcelona	1 - 0	Real Sociedad de Fútbol	Barcelona
	Garchitorena			Stadium: Industria; Referee: Julines

19 March 1917	FC Barcelona	2 - 2	Real Sociedad de Fútbol	Barcelona
	Sagi; Rovira			Stadium: Industria; Referee: Marti

6 May 1917	FC Barcelona	4 - 0	CE Europa	Barcelona
	Martines; Sancho; Serrats			Stadium: Industria; Referee: Marti

17 May 1917	FC Barcelona	2 - 1	Select Catalonia	Barcelona
	Martines; Hormeu			Stadium: Industria; Referee: Greenwell

27 May 1917	FC Barcelona	1 - 5	Real Unión Club de Irun	Barcelona
	Amat			Stadium: Industria; Referee: Femenia

28 May 1917	FC Barcelona	1 - 1	Real Unión Club de Irun	Barcelona
	Martinez			Stadium: Industria; Referee: Peris

29 May 1917	FC Barcelona	0 - 1	Real Unión Club de Irun	Barcelona
				Stadium: Industria; Referee: Carcer

24 June 1917	FC Barcelona	1 - 0	CF Badalona	Barcelona
	Martinez			Stadium: Industria; Referee: Peris

1 July 1917	FC Barcelona	3 - 1	CE Europa	Barcelona
	Martinez; Suque			Stadium: Rubi; Referee: Vals

? July 1917	Iluro Sport Club	0 - 1	FC Barcelona	Mataró
			Martinez	Stadium: Iluro; Referee: Jack Greenwell

5 August 1917	CE Europa	0 - 2	FC Barcelona	Barcelona
			Sancho; Martinez	Stadium: Europa; Referee: Alemany

Catalan championship games

26 November 1916	FC Barcelona	4 - 0	CS Sabadell	Barcelona
	Martínez; Garchitorena; Llobet; Costa			Stadium: Camp del carrer Indústria; Referee: Brias

3 December 1916	FC Espanya	2 - 1	FC Barcelona	Barcelona
15:00	Prats 70'		Martínez	Stadium: Camp del carrer Entença / València; Referee: Palomera

17 December 1916	FC Barcelona	3 - 0	RCD Español	Barcelona
	Costa; Martínez			Stadium: Camp del carrer Indústria; Referee: Julinés

7 January 1917	FC Internacional	0 - 0	FC Barcelona	Barcelona
				Stadium: Camp del carrer Galileu; Referee: Pons

14 January 1917	FC Barcelona	4 - 3	Universitary SC	Barcelona
	Castells; Garchitorena; Hormeu; Costa		Goal	Stadium: Camp del carrer Indústria; Referee: Sanpere

21 January 1917	FC Atlético de Sabadell	0 - 2	FC Barcelona	Sabadell
			Hormeu	Stadium: Camp del carrer Fray Luis de León; Referee: Palomera

25 February 1917	CS Sabadell	1 - 2	FC Barcelona	Sabadell
	Monistrol		Costa; Martínez	Stadium: Camp de la Creu Alta; Referee: Brias

4 March 1917	FC Barcelona	2 - 2	FC Espanya	Barcelona
	Costa; Martínez		Cella; Baró	Stadium: Camp del carrer Indústria; Referee: Torrens

11 March 1917	RCD Español	0 - 0	FC Barcelona	Barcelona
				Stadium: Velòdrom Parc d'Sports; Referee: Palomera

23 March 1917	'Universitary SC	1 - 4	FC Barcelona	Barcelona
	Goal		Hormeu; Baonza; Serrat; Comamala (p.p.)	Referee: Lemmel

1 April 1917	FC Barcelona	5 - 0	FC Atlético de Sabadell	Barcelona
	Martínez; Sancho; Rodríguez			Stadium: Camp del carrer Indústria; Referee: Baró

15 April 1917	FC Barcelona	2 - 1	FC Internacional	Barcelona
	Hormeu; Sancho		Goal	Stadium: Camp del carrer Indústria; Referee: Femenia

- The first six matches were counted as defeats due to illegal lineups.

Foronda Cup

21 April 1917 1st match	FC Madrid	3 - 1	FC Barcelona	Madrid
			Martínez	Referee: Pelayo Serrano

23 April 1917 2nd match	FC Madrid	0 - 0	FC Barcelona	Madrid
				Referee: Pelayo Serrano
