= Mario Passani =

Spanish footballer (1891–1981)

Personal information
- Full name: Mario Passani Buggiani
- Date of birth: 1891
- Place of birth: Barcelona, Catalonia, Spain
- Date of death: 2 November 1981 (aged 90)
- Position: Forward

Senior career*
Years	Team	Apps	(Gls)
1909–1917	FC Espanya		
1917	Racing de Madrid		
1917	FC Barcelona		
1917–1918	FC Espanya		
1918	Racing de Madrid		
1918–1919	FC Espanya		

International career
1910	Catalonia	1	(0)
- * Club domestic league appearances and goals

Mario Passani Buggiani, also known as Passani I (1891 – 2 November 1981), was a Spanish footballer of Italian ancestry who played as a forward, spending most of his career with FC Espanya, but also enjoying bried spells at Racing de Madrid and FC Barcelona. His brother Roberto also played for Espanya.

== Club career ==
Born in Catalonia, he began his career at his hometown club FC Espanya in the late-1900s, playing with them for nearly a decade. He was a member of the team's attacking quintet in the 1910s, which also had Pantaleón Salvó, Antonio Baró and the Jaimes (Bellavista and Villena), and even though the team's main source of power was its backline with Hermenegild Casellas and Eduardo Reguera, he played an important role in the team's rise to national dominance, competing head-to-head against the likes of Barcelona and Espanyol and winning three Catalan championships (1912–13, 1913–14 and 1916–17), the 1914 Pyrenees Cup and he also was pivotal in helping Espanya reach the 1914 Copa del Rey Final, which still stands as the only Copa del Rey Final of the club's history, but they lost 1–2 to Athletic Bilbao (then known as Athletic Club), courtesy of a brace from Severino Zuazo. He also helped Espanya win the 1914 Pyrenees Cup, netting the only goal of a 1–0 victory over Universitary SC and featuring in the final as they beat Cométe et Simot 3–1.

At the end of his career, he often moved to Madrid for professional reasons, and while in the capital he played with Racing de Madrid in two very brief stints in 1917 and 1918. He also enjoyed a brief spell at FC Barcelona in 1917. He retired with FC Espanya at the end of the 1918–19 season.

== International career ==
Like many other FC Espanya players of that time, Passani was eligible to play for the Catalonia national team, earning one cap in a friendly against FC Barcelona on 9 February 1910, which ended in a 2–3 loss.

== Honours ==
FC Espanya

- Catalan championship: 1912–13, 1913–14, 1916–17
- Copa del Rey runner-up: 1914
