= Real Madrid v FC Barcelona (1916 Copa del Rey) =

- Event: 1916 Copa del Rey
| Madrid | Barcelona |
| 15 | 11 |

First leg
| Madrid | Barcelona |
| 1 | 2 |
- Date: 26 March 1916
- Venue: Camp del Carrer Muntaner, Barcelona
- Referee: (Spain) Leandro Aguirreche

Second leg
| Barcelona | Madrid |
| 1 | 4 |
- Date: 2 April 1916
- Venue: Campo de O'Donnell, Madrid
- Referee: (Spain) Ezequiel Montero

Replay
| Barcelona | Madrid |
| 6 | 6 |
- Date: 13 April 1916
- Venue: Campo de O'Donnell (Atlético Madrid), Madrid
- Referee: (Spain) José Berraondo

In the semifinals of the 1916 Copa del Rey, Real Madrid defeated Barcelona after facing each other four times in just under three weeks and of several decisions by the referee José Berraondo, a former Madrid player, which were regarded as controversial by contemporary press reports.

In the first leg at Barcelona, the Catalans defeated Madrid 2–1, and in the second leg at Campo de O'Donnell, the whites finally achieved their first official victory against Barcelona: 4–1. At the time, there was no goal difference, so they had to go to a tiebreaker, which led to one of the earliest recorded disputes between the two clubs, namely about the choice of the venue, O'Donnell again, and the referee, José Berraondo. In the replay, Berraondo awarded three penalties in favor of his former team, two of which were saved by Barça's goalkeeper Luis Bru (one of which with his head), but the third was converted by Santiago Bernabéu in the 118th minute to salvage a 6–6 draw, thus forcing another replay, which was also refereed by Berraondo, whose decisions were again protested by the Barcelona players, such as giving yet another last-minute penalty, which drove the Barça players to withdraw in protest. Madrid thus advanced to the final against Athletic Bilbao that was played in Barcelona, wheresome banners in the stands criticized Berraondo's refereeing; Madrid lost 0–4.

Some football historians and sources have described this series as among the most controversial in early Spanish football history. Thanks to its resounding result, behind-the-scenes drama, and controversy for a total of 26 goals in 4 matches, including a 6–6 draw, match has been described by some sports historians as a significant event in early 20th-century Spanish football. Some historians ascribe the match a lasting impact on both Madrid and Catalonia football history, contributing to the birth of the well-known football rivalry between the two regions.

== Background ==
Real Madrid and FC Barcelona faced each other for the first time on 13 May 1902, in the semifinals of the 1902 Copa de la Coronación, the forerunner of the Copa del Rey founded a year later, and although the tournament was organized by Madrid FC and held in the capital, it was the Catalans who won 3–1. Most of their first meetings were friendly matches since the national league did not yet exist and the only official competition at the national level was the Copa del Rey, a competition that was not yet very developed since it was reached from the Regional Championships. Even though Madrid and Barcelona quickly became the best clubs of their respective region, the highest period of one seemed to always coincide with the lowest period of the other, and thus they failed to meet at the Copa del Rey. For instance, Madrid won four consecutive cups between 1904 and 1908, but during this period the Catalan championship was won by RCD Espanyol in 1904 and by X Sporting Club in 1905–08; and when Barcelona then won three out of four cups between 1910 and 1913, the Campeonato Regional Centro was being won by Sociedad Gimnástica.

As a result of these mismatches, between 1902 and 1916, they only contested friendlies, playing seven of them in total, with Barça holding the advantage with five victories while giving up two draws. It was only at the 1916 Copa del Rey, 14 years after their first competitive match, that they finally met again, and again in the semi-finals, in a clash that was set up after two of the five teams that qualified for the final phase declined to play.

== Summary ==
=== First and second leg ===
In the first leg at the Camp del Carrer Muntaner on 26 March 1916, it was the visitors who drew first blood with a goal from Juan Petit, but Barça then fought back and turned it around with two goals, both at the end of each half, from Paulino Alcántara and Vicente Martínez, to seal a 2–1 hard-fought victory. In the return leg, on 2 April 1916 at the O'Donnell field (not yet a stadium), the whites finally achieved their first official victory against Barcelona: 4–1, the courtesy of a hat-trick from Santiago Bernabéu (one from a penalty), while the remaining goals were netted by Petit and Martínez, who thus scored for their respective teams again. The first leg was refereed by a former Barça player, Leandro Aguirreche, while the referee of the second was perhaps the most neutral out of all of them, Ezequiel Montero, who at the time was playing for Racing de Madrid.

=== Replay ===
At the time, it was not the goal difference that mattered, but the victories, and with which having won their respective home game, they had to go to a tiebreaker, which sparked the very first conflict between both clubs, namely about the choice of the referee, José Berraondo, who had played for Madrid between 1904 and 1909, and who had lost the 1913 UECF cup final to Barcelona. Just as Madrid changed its referee, Barça changed its goalkeeper, replacing Francisco Aramburu by Luis Bru. Luis Bru is sometimes confused with Paco Bru, who at that time was a recently retired player who was only in Madrid as a special envoy for Mundo Deportivo. And that he played with Barcelona in the 6-6 match: part of the culé team had arrived late due to a railway problem and since there were players missing and Paco had been a player of the club not too long ago, he was asked to do the please, which he did, but with a different shirt from the others since he did not have one (official club shirts were scarce at the time. Madrid himself was also reinforced, with Luis Belaúnde from Atlético Madrid, and Casanova from the Toledo Infantry Academy. The game was held at O'Donnell again, but this time in the field of Atlético Madrid.

Just like in the previous match at O'Donnell, it was Madrid who scored the opening goal via Belaunde and it was Madrid who then got a penalty, but this time Bernabéu missed it, which killed off their momentum and allowed Barça to equalize in the 15th minute thanks to Alcántara. Barça's goalkeeper Bru then scored an own goal, but Alcántara once again equalized to make it 2 apiece. Alcántara then sealed its hat-trick still in the first half, but the goal was disallowed by Berraondo. In the second half, Belaúnde restored Madrid's lead, but two Barça goals from Casimiro Mallorquí and Gabriel Bau saw the Catalans in the lead for the first time. Berraondo then gave another penalty in favor of Madrid, this time taken by Sotero Aranguren and this time saved by Bru, who thus redeemed himself from his own goal. However, Madrid found the equalizer anyway via Belaúnde in the 87th minute, who not only sealed his hat-trick, but also sealed a 4–4 draw, thus forcing extra time where Bernabéu scored, but then Alcántara sealed his own hat-trick and Martínez put the Catalans back in front in the 112th minute. In the last minute, however, Berraondo then gave his third penalty of the night in favor of Madrid, although at least this one was not discussed (a harsh tackle by Barcelona's captain Santiago Massana), and this time Bernabéu did take advantage of it to salvage a 6–6 draw and forced a new tiebreaker.

La Vanguardia reported that, in Barcelona, dozens of people gathered around the telephone exchanges to learn about the progress of the matches.

=== Second replay ===
The second replay was also held in O'Donnell and again refereed by Berraondo, despite Barcelona expressing their reservations, remembering the three penalties and the disallowed goal. During the build-up for the match, it was discovered that Madrid suffered the loss of Belaúnde, the scorer of three goals in the previous match, and that he had been replaced by a certain Zabalo, who Madrid claimed to belong to their second team, but the veracity of this statement was then disputed since Zabalo had played that entire season for Real Unión, which caused Barcelona to protest, but the governing bodies authorized the change.

For the first time at O'Donnell, it was Barcelona who took the lead with a goal from Martínez, who thus scored in all four matches, being the only one to do so. Bernabéu equalized even though the Barcelona players and even the goal judge, who then existed next to the goals, claimed offside, but Berraondo dismissed the offside claims as Martínez then restored the lead before half-time. Just like in the previous match, Madrid found a late equalizer, but this time instead of being Belaúnde, it was his replacement Zabalo. Berraondo then made another questionable decision by giving yet another last-minute penalty with the score tied at 2, but Bru, living up to his fame, saved that one as well, his third overall, and thus forcing extra-time, in which Sotero Aranguren scored twice, although the Barcelona players protested that the Madrid attackers had grabbed Bru in the second goal, but Berraondo once again did not accept the complaint.

Believing that the referee had consistently favored Madrid, according to some contemporary accounts, the captain Massana decided to withdraw in protest, and at his signal, the Barcelona players left the field, although the managers present attempted to prevent the team's withdrawal. The chronicles of the time say that the end of the match was strange: the public silently accompanied the departure of both teams, but voiced disapproval of Berraondo's performance. The Barcelona players returned to Barcelona that same night at the Rápido, receiving a warm welcome from supporters upon their return to Barcelona.

== First leg ==
26 March 1916

| FC Barcelona (Catalonia) | 2–1 | Madrid FC |
|---|---|---|
| Alcántara 39'; Martínez 85' | Report | Juan Petit 17' |

Camp del carrer Muntaner, Barcelona
Referee: (Spain) Leandro Aguirreche

| GK | 1 | (Spain) Francisco Aramburu |
| DF | 2 | (Spain) Santiago Massana (c) |
| DF | 3 | (Spain) Eduardo Reguera |
| MF | 4 | (Spain) Alfredo Massana |
| MF | 5 | (Spain) Casimiro Mallorquí |
| MF | 6 | (Philippines) Paulino Alcántara |
| FW | 7 | (Spain) Vicente Martínez |
| FW | 8 | (Spain) Gabriel Bau |
| FW | 9 | (Spain) Francisco Vinyals |
| FW | 10 | (Spain) Francisco Baonza |
| FW | 11 | (Argentina) Enrique Peris |
Manager:
Jack Greenwell

| GK | 1 | (Spain) Eduardo Teus |
| DF | 2 | (Spain) Julio de la Serna |
| DF | 3 | (Spain) José Irureta |
| MF | 4 | (Spain) José Antonio Erice |
| MF | 5 | (Spain) José María Castell |
| MF | 6 | (France) René Petit |
| FW | 7 | (Argentina) Eulogio Aranguren |
| FW | 8 | (Argentina) Sotero Aranguren |
| FW | 9 | (France) Juan Petit |
| FW | 10 | (Spain) Santiago Bernabéu (c) |
| FW | 11 | (Spain) Gomar |
Manager:
None

== Second leg ==
2 April 1916

| Madrid FC | 4–1 | (Catalonia) FC Barcelona |
|---|---|---|
| Bernabéu 35' (pen.), 40', 60'; Juan Petit 80' | Report | Martínez 20' |

Campo de O'Donnell, Madrid
Referee: (Spain) Ezequiel Montero

| GK | 1 | (Spain) Pablo Lemmel |
| DF | 2 | (Spain) Julio de la Serna |
| DF | 3 | (Spain) José Irureta |
| MF | 4 | (Spain) José Antonio Erice |
| MF | 5 | (Spain) José María Castell |
| MF | 6 | (France) René Petit |
| FW | 7 | (Argentina) Eulogio Aranguren |
| FW | 8 | (Argentina) Sotero Aranguren |
| FW | 9 | (France) Juan Petit |
| FW | 10 | (Spain) Santiago Bernabéu (c) |
| FW | 11 | (Spain) Gomar |
Manager:
None

| GK | 1 | (Spain) Francisco Aramburu |
| DF | 2 | (Spain) Josep Costa |
| DF | 3 | (Spain) Eduardo Reguera |
| MF | 4 | (Spain) Paco Bru |
| MF | 5 | (Spain) Ramón Torralba |
| MF | 6 | (Spain) Casimiro Mallorquí |
| FW | 7 | (Philippines) Paulino Alcántara |
| FW | 8 | (Spain) Vicente Martínez |
| FW | 9 | (Spain) Gabriel Bau |
| FW | 10 | (Spain) Enrique Peris |
| FW | 11 | (Spain) Francisco Baonza |
Manager:
Jack Greenwell

== First replay ==
13 April 1916

| Madrid FC | 6–6 (a.e.t.) | (Catalonia) FC Barcelona |
|---|---|---|
| Belaunde 2', 55', 87'; Bernabéu 23', 98', 118' (pen.) | Report | Alcántara 15', 30', 102'; Mallorqui 67'; Bau 70'; Martínez 112' |

Campo de O'Donnell, Madrid
Referee: (Spain) José Berraondo

| GK | 1 | (Spain) Pablo Lemmel |
| DF | 2 | (Spain) Julio de la Serna |
| DF | 3 | (Spain) José Antonio Erice |
| MF | 4 | (Spain) José María Castell |
| MF | 5 | (France) René Petit |
| MF | 6 | (Argentina) Eulogio Aranguren |
| FW | 7 | (Argentina) Sotero Aranguren |
| FW | 8 | (France) Juan Petit |
| FW | 9 | (Spain) Santiago Bernabéu (c) |
| FW | 10 | (Spain) Luis Belaunde |
| FW | 11 | (Spain) Casanova |
Manager:
None

| GK | 1 | (Spain) Luis Bru |
| DF | 2 | (Spain) Santiago Massana (c) |
| DF | 3 | (Spain) Eduardo Reguera |
| MF | 4 | (Spain) Alfredo Massana |
| MF | 5 | (Spain) Ramón Torralba |
| MF | 6 | (Spain) Casimiro Mallorquí |
| FW | 7 | (Philippines) Paulino Alcántara |
| FW | 8 | (Spain) Vicente Martínez |
| FW | 9 | (Spain) Francisco Baonza |
| FW | 10 | (Spain) Francisco Vinyals |
| FW | 11 | (Spain) Gabriel Bau |
Manager:
Jack Greenwell

== Second replay ==
15 April 1916

| Madrid FC | 4–2 | (Catalonia) FC Barcelona |
|---|---|---|
| Bernabéu 25'; Zabalo 85'; Aranguren 100', 108' | Report | Martínez 11', 38' |

Campo de O'Donnell, Madrid
Referee: (Spain) José Berraondo

| GK | 1 | (Spain) Eduardo Teus |
| DF | 2 | (Spain) Julio de la Serna |
| DF | 3 | (Spain) José Antonio Erice |
| MF | 4 | (France) René Petit |
| MF | 5 | (Argentina) Eulogio Aranguren |
| MF | 6 | (Argentina) Sotero Aranguren |
| FW | 7 | (France) Juan Petit |
| FW | 8 | (Spain) Santiago Bernabéu (c) |
| FW | 9 | (Spain) Zabalo |
| FW | 10 | (Spain) Casanova |
| FW | 11 | (Spain) Arturo Espinosa. |
Manager:
None

| GK | 1 | (Spain) Luis Bru |
| DF | 2 | (Spain) Santiago Massana (c) |
| DF | 3 | (Spain) Eduardo Reguera |
| MF | 4 | (Spain) Alfredo Massana |
| MF | 5 | (Spain) Ramón Torralba |
| MF | 6 | (Spain) Casimiro Mallorquí |
| FW | 7 | (Philippines) Paulino Alcántara |
| FW | 8 | (Spain) Vicente Martínez |
| FW | 9 | (Spain) Gabriel Bau |
| FW | 10 | (Spain) Francisco Vinyals |
| FW | 11 | (Spain) Enrique Peris |
Manager:
Jack Greenwell

== Statistics ==
=== Goalscorers ===
There were 26 goals scored in 4 matches, for an average of 6.5 goals per match.

7 goals

- Santiago Bernabéu

5 goals

- (Catalonia) Vicente Martínez

4 goals

- (Catalonia) Paulino Alcántara

3 goals

- Luis Belaunde

2 goals

- Sotero Aranguren
- Juan Petit

1 goal

- (Catalonia) Casimiro Mallorqui
- (Catalonia) Gabriel Bau
- Zabalo

== Aftermath ==
At the end of the match, the public strongly protested Berraondo's performance, and in the 1916 final between Madrid and Athletic Bilbao, which was played in Barcelona, some banners in the stands even asked for Berraondo's head; Madrid lost 0–4.

Some historians ascribe the match a lasting impact on both Madrid and Catalonia football history, contributing to the birth of the well-known football rivalry between the two regions.

== See also ==
- 1924 Prince of Asturias Cup final
- Real Madrid v FC Barcelona (1943 Copa del Generalísimo)
- El Clásico
