= Jaime Bellavista =

Spanish footballer

Personal information
- Date of birth: Unknown
- Place of birth: Barcelona, Spain
- Date of death: Unknown
- Position: Forward

Senior career*
Years	Team	Apps	(Gls)
1912–1917	FC Espanya		
- * Club domestic league appearances and goals

Jaime Bellavista was a Spanish footballer who played as a forward for FC Espanya. He was one of the most outstanding players in the 1914 Pyrenees Cup, being the tournament's top scorer with a total of 5 goals, including one in a 3–1 win over Cométe et Simot in the final.

== Club career ==
Born in Catalonia, he was a member of FC Espanya attacking quintet in the 1910s which also had Pantaleón Salvó, Antonio Baró, Mario Passani and Jaime Villena. He helped the team win three Catalan championships (1912–13, 1913–14 and 1916–17) and then helped the club reach their first (and only) Copa del Rey final in 1914, but they lost 1–2 to Athletic Bilbao, courtesy of a brace from Severino Zuazo.

The highlight of his career came on 29 March 1914 in the semi-finals of the 1914 Pyrenees Cup, in which Espanya faced city rivals FC Barcelona at the Camp de la Indústria, who had the tournament in the previous four occasions. Bellavista netted four goals to help his team to a resounding 5–2 win, and thus Espanya become the first-ever team to knock-out Barça from the competition. Bellavista went on to score a fifth goal in the final to help his side to a 3–1 victory over Cométe et Simot. These five goals made him the tournament's top scorer and he shared all-time top scorer in the competition's history alongside Antonio Morales, who also netted 5 goals in the Pyrenees Cup.

== Honours ==
=== Club ===
FC Espanya

- Catalan championship:
  - Champions (3): 1912–13, 1913–14 and 1916–17
- Copa del Rey:
  - Runner-up (1): 1914
- Pyrenees Cup:
  - Champions (1): 1914

=== Individual ===
- Top goalscorer of the 1914 Pyrenees Cup with 5 goals

=== Records ===
- Most goals in a single Pyrenees Cup tournament: 5 goals in 1914
- All-time top goal scorer of the Pyrenees Cup: 5 goals
