= 1915–16 FC Barcelona season =

17th season in existence of FC Barcelona

FC Barcelona
1915–16 season
- President: Rafael Llopart
- Manager: Jack Greenwell
- Campionat de Catalunya: Champion
- Campionat d'Espanya: Semifinale

The 1915–16 season was the 17th season for FC Barcelona.

== Results ==
Friendly

26 September 1915	RCD Espanyol	1–5	FC Barcelona	Barcelona
			Alcántara; Martínez; Vinyals	Stadium: Espanyol; Referee: Bru

3 October 1915	FC Barcelona	0–0	RCD Espanyol	Barcelona
				Stadium: Industria; Referee: Forns

31 October 1915	Athletic Club	3–2	FC Barcelona	Bilbao
			Alcántara; Hormeu	Stadium: San Mames; Referee: Mestraitua

1 November 1915	Athletic Club	4–0	FC Barcelona	Bilbao
				Stadium: San Mames; Referee: Arzuaga

1 January 1916	FC Barcelona	4–2	Athletic Club	Barcelona
	V.Martínez; Alcantara; A.Massana; Vinyals			Stadium: Industria; Referee: Bru

2 January 1916	FC Barcelona	1- 0	Athletic Club	Barcelona
	A.Massana			Stadium: Industria; Referee: Hamilton

5 March 1916	FC Barcelona	3–0	FC Madrid	Barcelona
	Vinyals; V.Martínez			Stadium: Industria; Referee: Forns

7 March 1916	FC Barcelona	0–0	FC Madrid	Barcelona
				Stadium: Industria; Referee: Bru

23 April 1916	FC Barcelona	0–0	Real Unión Club de Irun	Barcelona
				Stadium: Industria; Referee: Bru

24 April 1916	FC Barcelona	2–1	Real Unión Club de Irun	Barcelona
	Mallorqui; Alcantara			Stadium: Industria; Referee: Hamilton

29 April 1916	FC Barcelona	4–1	BSC Young Boys	Barcelona
	Alcantara; Arrnet; Torralba			Stadium: Industria; Referee: Hamilton

30 April 1916	FC Barcelona	4–0	BSC Young Boys	Barcelona
	Alcantara; Vinyals; S.Massana			Stadium: Industria; Referee: Bru

4 June 1916	L'Avenç de l'Sport	0–4	FC Barcelona	Barcelona
			Vinyals; Llobet; Costa	Stadium: Avenç; Referee: Ramirez

11 June 1916 Inauguració camp Athletic	Athletic FC de Sabadell	2–4	FC Barcelona	Sabadell
		Report	Vinyals; Martinez; Julia	Referee: Roca

12 June 1916	FC Barcelona	3–3	RCD Espanyol	Barcelona
	Martinez; Julia; Mallorqui			Stadium: Industria; Referee: Julines

24 June 1916	FC Barcelona	2–2	CE Sabadell FC	Barcelona
	Baonza; Ozores			Stadium: Industria; Referee: Lemmel

25 June 1916	CE Sabadell FC	1–2	FC Barcelona	Barcelona
			Martinez; Costa	Stadium: Sabadell; Referee: Bru

30 July 1916	FC Barcelona	3–2	CE Sabadell FC	Barcelona
	Martinez; Julia			Stadium: sant Feliu de Guíxols; Referee: Bru

Copa de Alcalde

8 December 1915	FC Barcelona	4–1	Universitary SC	Barcelona
	Martínez; Bau; A.Massana			Stadium: Industria; Referee: Sampere

Campionat de Catalunya

24 October 1915 Jornada 2 1a Fase	FC Barcelona	5–0	FC Internacional	Barcelona
	Alcántara; Martínez; Bau			Stadium: Velòdrom Parc d'Sports; Referee: Tallada

7 November 1915 Jornada 3 1a Fase	FC Barcelona	12–2	Universitary SC	Sabadell
	Alcántara; Martínez; Bau		Goal	Referee: Bru Sanz

14 November 1915 Jornada 4 1a Fase	FC Barcelona	7–0	Athletic FC de Sabadell	Barcelona
	Alcántara; Hormeu; Peris; Martínez; Torralba			Stadium: Camp del carrer Entença / València; Referee: Hamilton

21 November 1915 Jornada 5 1a Fase	FC Barcelona	3–1	FC Espanya	Barcelona
15:00	Alcántara; Martínez; Baonza		Cella	Stadium: Velòdrom Parc d'Sports; Referee: Hamilton

28 November 1915 Jornada 6 1a Fase	FC Barcelona	11–1	FC Badalona	Barcelona
	Martínez; Alcántara; Bau; Vinyals		Goal	Stadium: Velòdrom Parc d'Sports; Referee: Forns Saldaña

5 December 1915 Jornada 7 1a Fase	FC Barcelona	1–0	L'Avenç de l'Sport	Sabadell
	Vinyals	(pag. 3)		Referee: Forns Saldaña

12 December 1915 Jornada 8 1a Fase	FC Barcelona	5–0	CS Sabadell	Barcelona
	Alcántara; Bau			Stadium: Velòdrom Parc d'Sports; Referee: Palomera

16 January 1916 Jornada 1 1a Fase	FC Barcelona	2–0	RCD Español	Barcelona
	Bau; Martínez			Referee: Aguirreche

13 February 1916 2a Fase	FC Barcelona	3–2	FC Espanya	Barcelona
15:15	Martínez; Alcántara; Mallorquí		Baró	Stadium: Velòdrom Parc d'Sports; Referee: Domènech

20 February 1916 2a Fase	FC Barcelona	3–2	RCD Español	Barcelona
	Martínez; Alcántara		Usobiaga; Tormo	Referee: Aguirreche

27 February 1916 2a Fase	FC Barcelona	4–0	Universitary SC	Barcelona
	A. Massana; Alcántara; Martínez			Referee: Palomera

12 March 1916 2a Fase	FC Barcelona	3–2	CS Sabadell	Barcelona
	Costa; Mallorqui		Morales; Monistrol	Stadium: Velòdrom Parc d'Sports; Referee: Ramírez

19 March 1916 2a Fase	FC Barcelona	2–0	Athletic FC de Sabadell	Terrassa
	Goal	(p. 207)

Campionat d'Espanya

26 March 1916 Semifinale – First leg	FC Barcelona	2–1	FC Madrid	Barcelona
	Alcántara; Martínez		J. Petit	Stadium: Camp del carrer Muntaner; Referee: Aguirreche

2 April 1916 Semifinale – Second leg	FC Madrid	4–1	FC Barcelona	Madrid
	Bernabéu; R. Petit		Martínez	Stadium: Campo de O'Donell; Referee: Montero

13 April 1916 Semifinale – First replay	FC Madrid	6–6	FC Barcelona	Madrid
	Belaunde 2' 87' p.p. Bernabéu 118'		Alcántara 15' 30' 112'; Bau 70' 102'; Mallorquí 67'	Stadium: Campo de O'Donell; Referee: Berraondo (País Basc)

15 April 1916 Semifinale – Second replay	FC Madrid	4–2	FC Barcelona	Madrid
	Bernabéu; Zabala; Sotero		Martínez 11' 38'	Stadium: Campo de O'Donell; Referee: Berraondo (País Basc)
