= Cristóbal Salvó =

Spanish footballer

Personal information
- Full name: Cristóbal Salvó Saura
- Birth name: Cristòfol Salvó Saura
- Date of birth: 1895
- Place of birth: Barcelona, Catalonia, Spain
- Date of death: 17 August 1927 (aged 32)
- Place of death: Barcelona, Catalonia
- Position: Midfielder

Senior career*
Years	Team	Apps	(Gls)
1909–1918	FC Espanya		
1918–1919	RCD Espanyol		
1919–1922	FC Internacional		

International career
1910–1918	Catalonia	12	(0)
Medal record
Catalonia
Prince of Asturias Cup
Gold medal – first place	1916 Prince of Asturias Cup	Team
- * Club domestic league appearances and goals

Cristóbal Salvó Saura, also known as Salvó I (1895 - 17 August 1927), was a Spanish footballer who played as a midfielder for FC Espanya and RCD Espanyol. He was one of the most prominent Catalan footballers of the 1910s, being considered the best half-winger of his time. His brother Pantaleón also played for FC Espanya.

== Club career ==
Born in Catalonia, he began his career at his hometown club FC Espanya in the late-1900s, playing with them for nearly a decade. He was one of the most important players in the team's rise to become a powerhouse in Catalonia, competing head-to-head against the likes of Barcelona and Espanyol, being crucial in helping the club win three Catalan championships (1912–13, 1913–14 and 1916–17), the 1914 Pyrenees Cup and he also was pivotal in helping Espanya reach the 1914 Copa del Rey Final, which still is the club's only Copa del Rey final appearance, but they lost 1–2 to Athletic Bilbao, courtesy of a brace from Severino Zuazo. In the semi-finals of the 1914 Pyrenees Cup, Espanya defeated Barcelona with a resounding 5–2 win at the Camp de la Indústria, which prompted a pitch invasion where serious incidents happened including Cristóbal being attacked by Pere Molins, who gave him a punch that left him unconscious.

After leaving Espanya he had spells in RCD Espanyol and FC Internacional before ending his career. He died in 1927, aged just 32.

== International career ==
Like many other FC Espanya players of that time, Salvó played several matches for the Catalonia national team, being a member of the Catalan side that won the 1916 Prince of Asturias Cup, an inter-regional competition organized by the RFEF. At the tournament he teamed up with Emilio Sampere in the midfield. Salvó also participated in the following edition in 1917, in which Catalonia finished as runner-up to Madrid.

== Honours ==
=== Club ===
FC Espanya

- Catalan championship:
  - Champions (3): 1912–13, 1913–14 and 1916–17
- Copa del Rey:
  - Runner-up (1): 1914
- Pyrenees Cup:
  - Champions (1): 1914

=== International ===
Catalonia

- Prince of Asturias Cup:
  - Champions (1): 1916
  - Runner-up (1): 1917
