= Pere Molins =

Spanish footballer

Personal information
- Full name: Pere Molins Pascual
- Date of birth: 15 February 1889
- Place of birth: Almacelles, Lleida, Spain
- Date of death: 13 January 1955 (aged 65)
- Place of death: Barcelona, Catalonia, Spain
- Position: Defender

Senior career*
Years	Team	Apps	(Gls)
1906–1909	X Sporting Club		
1909–1912	Espanyol		
1912–1914	FC Barcelona		
- * Club domestic league appearances and goals

Pere Molins Pascual (15 February 1889 – 13 January 1955) was a Spanish footballer who played as a defender for Espanyol and FC Barcelona.

== Club career ==
Born in Almacelles in Lleida, he moved to Barcelona as a child and there he joined X Sporting Club during the 1906-07 season, forming a great defensive partnership with Santiago Massana, José Irízar and the club's goalkeeper, Pedro Gibert. Together with them, he helped the club win two back-to-back Catalan championships in 1907 and 1908. In 1909, the club was effectively relaunched as the Club Deportivo Español, the name which still stands today.

Molins played 3 seasons with Espanyol, playing a crucial role in helping his side win the 1911–12 Catalan championship, the club's first title in almost a decade. His great season at Espanyol and constant solid defensive performance earned him a move to FC Barcelona in 1912, thus becoming the first player from Lleida to play for Barça. In his first season with the club (1912–13) he won the Catalan championship again, the 5th of his career, he did not feature in any game of their triumphant campaigns at the Copa del Rey and Pyrenees Cup, as he was serving as a back-up for fellow X teammate José Irízar.

In the semi-finals of the 1914 Pyrenees Cup, Molins conceded five goals from city rivals FC Espanya in an embarrassing 2–5 loss at the Camp de la Indústria, which prompted a pitch invasion and among the turmoil, Molins attacked Cristóbal Salvó, giving him a punch that left him unconscious. He retired shortly after.

== Honours ==
=== Club ===
X Sporting Club

- Catalan Championships:
  - Winners (3) 1905–06, 1906–07 and 1907–08

Espanyol

- Catalan Championships:
  - Winners (1) 1911–12

Barcelona

- Catalan Championships:
  - Winners (1) 1912–13
