= 1917–18 FC Barcelona season =

19th season in existence of FC Barcelona

FC Barcelona
1917–18 season
- President: Hans Gamper
- Manager: Jack Greenwell
- Campionat de Catalunya: Third

The 1917–18 season was the 19th season for FC Barcelona.

== Results ==
Friendly

16 September 1917	FC Barcelona	3 - 1	UE Sants	Barcelona
	Hormeu; Gumbau; Costa			Stadium: Industria; Referee: Brias

23 September 1917	FC Barcelona	0 - 1	Racing Club de Madrid	Barcelona
				Stadium: Industria; Referee: Pozo

24 September 1917	FC Barcelona	1 - 2	Racing Club de Madrid	Barcelona
	Costa			Stadium: Industria; Referee: Bru

30 September 1917	CF Badalona	1 - 2	FC Barcelona	Barcelona
			Bau; Gumbau	Stadium: Badalona; Referee: Peris

7 October 1917	Terrassa FC	2 - 1	FC Barcelona	Barcelona
			Hormeu	Stadium: Terrassa; Referee: Vigil

21 October 1917	FC Barcelona	4 - 1	CE Europa	Barcelona
	Passani; Gumbau; Bau; Sagi			Stadium: Industria; Referee: Matas

28 October 1917	FC Barcelona	1 - 0	CF Badalona	Barcelona
	Gumbau			Stadium: Industria; Referee: Peris

1 November 1917	FC Barcelona	3 - 0	FC Madrid	Barcelona
	Vinyals; Sagi Barba			Stadium: Industria; Referee: Femenia

4 November 1917	FC Barcelona	4 - 1	FC Madrid	Barcelona
	Sagi; Gumbau; Hormeu			Stadium: Industria; Referee: Femenia

25 November 1917	FC Barcelona	2 - 2	FC Internacional	Barcelona
	Rovira; Gumbau			Stadium: Industria; Referee: Peris

23 December 1917	FC Barcelona	2 - 3	Terrassa FC	Barcelona
	Torralda			Stadium: Industria; Referee: Peris

26 December 1917	FC Barcelona	2 - 0	Universitary SC	Barcelona
	Bau			Stadium: Industria; Referee: Brias

30 December 1917	FC Barcelona	5 - 0	Atlètic de Sabadell	Barcelona
	Gumbau; Blanco; Suque			Stadium: Industria; Referee: Alemany

1 January 1918	FC Barcelona	3 - 3	UE Sants	Barcelona
	Gumbau; Bau; Rovira			Stadium: Industria; Referee: Torras

2 February 1918	RCD Espanyol	3 - 2	FC Barcelona	Barcelona
			Martinez	Stadium: Espanyol; Referee: Sampere

3 January 1918	FC Barcelona	5 - 2	RCD Espanyol	Barcelona
	Martinez; Sagi; Vinyals; Gumbau			Stadium: Industria; Referee: Peris

24 February 1918	UE Sants	2 - 2	FC Barcelona	Barcelona
			Alcaniz; Reguera	Stadium: Sants; Referee: Torras

3 March 1918	FC Barcelona	1 - 1	FC Internacional	Barcelona
	Martinez			Stadium: Industria; Referee: Quirante

10 March 1918	L'Avenç de l'Sport	0 - 6	FC Barcelona	Barcelona
			Gumbau; Martinez	Stadium: Avenc; Referee: Baonza

17 March 1918	CE Júpiter	1 - 3	FC Barcelona	Barcelona
			Gumbau; Bau; Sagi	Stadium: Poble Nou; Referee: Estrada

24 March 1918	FC Barcelona	6 - 3	Stadium Madrid	Barcelona
	Verdoux; Gumbau; Vinyals; Sotillos equip contrari			Stadium: Industria; Referee: Quirante

25 March 1918	FC Barcelona	9 - 0	Stadium Madrid	Barcelona
	Julia; Rovira; Sagi; Gumbau			Stadium: Industria; Referee: Alemany

1 April 1918	FC Barcelona	2 - 3	Real Unión Club de Irun	Barcelona
	Julia; Gumbau			Stadium: Industria; Referee: Torrens

2 April 1918	FC Barcelona	1 - 1	Real Unión Club de Irun	Barcelona
	Gumbau			Stadium: Industria; Referee: Sampere

14 April 1918	FC Barcelona	1 - 0	CE Sabadell FC	Barcelona
	Vinyals			Stadium: Industria; Referee: Matas

21 April 1918	CE Sabadell FC	2 - 1	FC Barcelona	Barcelona
			Sagi	Stadium: Sabadell; Referee: Pascual

19 May 1918	CF Badalona	2 - 0	FC Barcelona	Barcelona
				Stadium: Badalona

20 May 1918	FC Madrid	1 - 2	FC Barcelona	Madrid
			Alcantara; Martinez	Referee: Montero

26 May 1918	UE Sants	4 - 4	FC Barcelona	Barcelona
			Vinyals; Verdoux; Baonza	Stadium: Sants; Referee: Torras

9 June 1918	FC Barcelona	4 - 1	CE Europa	Barcelona
	Martinez; Alcantara			Stadium: Industria; Referee: Matas

23 June 1918	FC Barcelona	5 - 1	UE Sants	Barcelona
	Martinez; Alcantara; Sagi			Stadium: Industria; Referee: Peris

14 July 1918	L'Avenç de l'Sport	0 - 6	FC Barcelona	Barcelona
			Gumbau; Loredo; Sancho; Rovira	Stadium: Avenc; Referee: Baonza

Copa Barcelona

12 May 1918	FC Barcelona	3 - 0	RCD Espanyol	Barcelona
	Julia; Sagi; Sancho			Stadium: Espanya; Referee: Alemany

2 June 1918	FC Barcelona	1 - 1	FC Espanya	Barcelona
	Sagi			Stadium: Espanyol; Referee: Palomera

Campionat de Catalunya

11 November 1917	RCD Español	1 - 1	FC Barcelona	Barcelona
	Gràcia		Gumbau	Stadium: Velòdrom Parc d'Sports; Referee: Quirante Pineda

18 November 1917	Atlètic FC de Sabadell	1 - 0	FC Barcelona	Sabadell
	Sisquella			Stadium: Camp del carrer Fra Lluís de Lleó; Referee: Peris

2 December 1917	FC Internacional	0 - 2	FC Barcelona	Barcelona
			Sancho; Bau	Stadium: Camp del carrer Galileu; Referee: Lemmel

9 December 1917	FC Barcelona	2 - 1	CS Sabadell	Barcelona
	Bau; Sancho		Domènech	Stadium: Camp del carrer Indústria; Referee: Pozo

16 December 1917	FC Barcelona	1 - 0	FC Espanya	Barcelona
	Bau			Stadium: Camp del carrer Indústria; Referee: Sanpere

13 January 1918	FC Barcelona	1 - 2	RCD Español	Barcelona
	Martínez		Gràcia; Alvarado	Stadium: Camp del carrer Indústria; Referee: Bru Sanz

20 January 1918	FC Barcelona	2 - 1	Atlètic FC de Sabadell	Barcelona
	Martínez; Sancho		Mallorquí	Stadium: Camp del carrer Indústria; Referee: Salvo

27 January 1918	FC Barcelona	5 - 1	FC Internacional	Barcelona
	Gumbau; Sagi; Martínez		Goal	Stadium: Camp del carrer Indústria; Referee: Alemany

10 February 1918	CS Sabadell	1 - 2	FC Barcelona	Sabadell
	Balart		Sagi; Martínez	Stadium: Camp de la Creu Alta; Referee: Quirante Pineda

17 February 1918	FC Espanya	2 - 1	FC Barcelona	Barcelona
	Díaz		Bau	Stadium: Camp del carrer Entença / València; Referee: Alemany
