= Casimiro Mallorquí =

Spanish footballer (1894–1966)

Personal information
- Full name: Casimiro Mallorquí Tutusaus
- Date of birth: 11 October 1894
- Place of birth: Valls, Catalonia, Spain
- Date of death: 21 June 1966 (aged 71)
- Place of death: Barcelona, Catalonia, Spain
- Position: Forward

Senior career*
Years	Team	Apps	(Gls)
1911–1912	CU Sportive Marais		
1911–1912	Crédit Lyonnais		
1912–1913	FC Espanya		
1913–1916	Barcelona		
1916–1917	Espanyol		
1917–1918	FC Atlético de Sabadell		
1918–1921	Espanyol		
1921–1923	Barcelona		
1923–1926	Espanyol		

International career
1915–1921	Catalonia	9	(2)
Medal record
Catalonia
Prince of Asturias Cup
Silver medal – second place	1915 Prince of Asturias Cup	Team
- * Club domestic league appearances and goals

Casimiro Mallorquí Tutusaus (11 October 1894 – 21 June 1966) was a Spanish footballer who played as a forward for Espanyol and Barcelona. He later worked as a football referee.

== Club career ==
Being the son of a well-off family in Valls, Mallorquí was sent to France to complete his studies, and while there, he developed a deep interest in football, playing this sport with CU Sportive Marais and Crédit Lyonnais in 1911–12. He returned to his homeland in 1912, at the age of 18, and in that same year, he joined the ranks of FC Espanya de Barcelona, where he formed an attacking partnership with Gabriel Bau and Antonio Baró, and quickly became a key element of the team. Even though the team's main source of power was its infamous backline made of Hermenegild Casellas and Eduardo Reguera, he also played a very important role in the team's rise to national dominance, competing head-to-head against the likes of Barcelona and Espanyol, helping FC Espanya win its first-ever pieces of silverware, the Catalan championship in 1912–13.

His great attacking performances eventually drew the attention of Barcelona, who signed him in 1913, thus becoming the first footballer from the Tarragona area to play for the club. At Barça, Mallorquí was mostly used as a substitute by then coach Jack Greenwell due to the presence of Vicente Martínez, Paulino Alcántara, Enrique Peris, and his former teammate Bau.

In 1916 Mallorquí signed for RCD Espanyol, the club where he spent the most time, playing a total of 7 seasons with them during three different stages, the first of which lasting only one year as he then joined FC Atlético de Sabadell in an equally short spell as he then returned to Espanyol at the end of the season. His second and third spells at Espanyol (1918–21 and 1923–26) both lasted three seasons, being interrupted by a two-year stay at FC Barcelona between 1921 and 1923, thus being a part of the club's first golden age that won two Catalan championships and one Copa del Rey between 1920 and 1923; however, he did not play a major role in these triumphs because that golden age prevented him from often playing in a first-team consisting of the likes of Vicente Piera, Josep Samitier, Ricardo Zamora, Alcántara and Sagi-Barba. Despite not being a prominent regular, Mallorquí played a match in the 1922 Copa del Rey, thus being a part of the squad that won the 1922 Cup title. In total, he played 25 official matches for Barça, scoring five goals.

When he retired in 1927, at age 33, Mallorquí became a referee, a task he did until his early 40s.

== International career ==
Like many other FC Barcelona and RCD Espanyol players of that time, Mallorquí was eligible to play for the Catalan national team, scoring two goals in 9 matches between 1915 and 1921. In May 1915, he was a member of the team that participated in the first edition of the Prince of Asturias Cup in 1915, an inter-regional competition organized by the RFEF.

On 10 July 1927, Mallorquí was the subject of a tribute match along with José Maria Canals, which took place at the Sarrià Stadium between Catalonia and RCD Espanyol, playing for the former in a 1–4 loss.

== Honours ==
FC Espanya

- Catalan Championships: 1912–13

Barcelona

- Catalan Championships: 1916 and 1922
- Copa del Rey: 1922

Catalonia

- Prince of Asturias Cup runner-up: 1915
