= Pablo Lemmel =

Spanish footballer (1892–1982)

Personal information
- Full name: Pablo Lemmel Malo de Molina
- Date of birth: 1 August 1892
- Place of birth: Barcelona, Catalonia, Spain
- Date of death: 17 January 1982 (aged 89)
- Place of death: Barcelona, Catalonia, Spain
- Position: Goalkeeper

Senior career*
Years	Team	Apps	(Gls)
1907	Atlético Madrid		
1907–1909	Sociedad Gimnástica		
1909	Español de Madrid		
1909–1910	Sociedad Gimnástica		
1910–1911	Madrid FC		
1914–1918	Madrid FC		
1919	Espanyol		
- * Club domestic league appearances and goals

Pablo Lemmel Malo de Molina (8 January 1892 – 17 January 1982) was a Spanish footballer who played as a goalkeeper for Atlético Madrid, Madrid FC, Espanyol in the 1910s. He was also international with the Catalan national team during the 1930s. He also briefly worked as a referee. His brother, Manuel, also played for Espanyol.

== Playing career ==
Pablo Lemmel was born on 8 January 1892 in Barcelona, but it was in Madrid where he played most of his career, taking his first steps at Atlético in 1907, aged only 15, and then at Sociedad Gimnástica (1907–09), before joining the ranks of Español de Madrid in 1909. For the latter club, he only played two official matches, both in the 1909 Copa del Rey, including the final, which ended in a 3–1 loss to Club Ciclista.

Lemmel then returned to Sociedad Gimnástica for one more season in 1909–10, which at the time had a great team, captained by the midfielder Sócrates Quintana, and with José Carruana and José Manuel Kindelán teaming up with Lemmel on defense, and together, they won the 1909–10 Centro Regional Championship. However, Gimnástica did not participate in the subsequent 1910 Copa del Rey, and since their team was not competing for the title, Kindelán and Lemmel were thus chosen to act as referees in the tournament, with the latter overseeing the final (FECF) between FC Barcelona and his former club Español de Madrid, which ended in a 3–2 win to the former. Aged only 18, he probably remains the youngest referee to have officiated a Copa del Rey final.

His goalkeeping performances did not go unnoticed by Gimnástica's main rival, Madrid FC, which signed him in 1910. Even though he stayed licensed with Madrid for eight years, until 1918, he only played seven official matches, all in the 1915–16 season, including five in the regional championship, which they won, and two in the Copa del Rey. The latter two came in the semifinals of the cup, in which Madrid faced Barcelona in the first competitive El Clásico in 14 years; Eduardo Teus had started in the first leg in Barcelona, but following a 2–1 loss, Madrid's board decided to replace him with Lemmel for the second leg at home, and he proved to be the best option as he helped Madrid to a 4–1 win, thus forcing a replay in which he conceded six goals in a 6–6 draw, so Teus returned to the starting eleven for the second replay, which Madrid finally won 4–2, thus reaching the final in which Lemmel was an unused substitute, and without him, Madrid lost 4–0 to Bilbao.

In 1918, he returned to Catalonia to join the ranks of RCD Espanyol, for whom he played just once, in a Catalan championship match against CE Sabadell, playing as goalkeeper because the usual starter Ramon Bruguera was sick that day.

== Later life ==
After retiring, Lemmel was a football referee, and a member of Espanyol's board of directors, attending the inauguration of the Sarrià Stadium in 1922, and remaining linked to RCD Español for several years.

On the morning of 1 November 1924, the 32-year-old Lemmel was an unused substitute in a match between Madrid's veterans of 1904 against those of 1916, which was held on the occasion of the tributes to Sotero Aranguren and Alberto Machimbarrena.

== Death ==
Lemmel died in Barcelona on 17 January 1982, at the age of 90.

== Honours ==
Español de Madrid

- Copa del Rey runner-up: 1909

Sociedad Gimnástica

- Centro Championship: 1909–10

Madrid FC

- Centro Championship: 1915–16
- Copa del Rey runner-up: 1916
