= Antonio Baró =

Spanish footballer

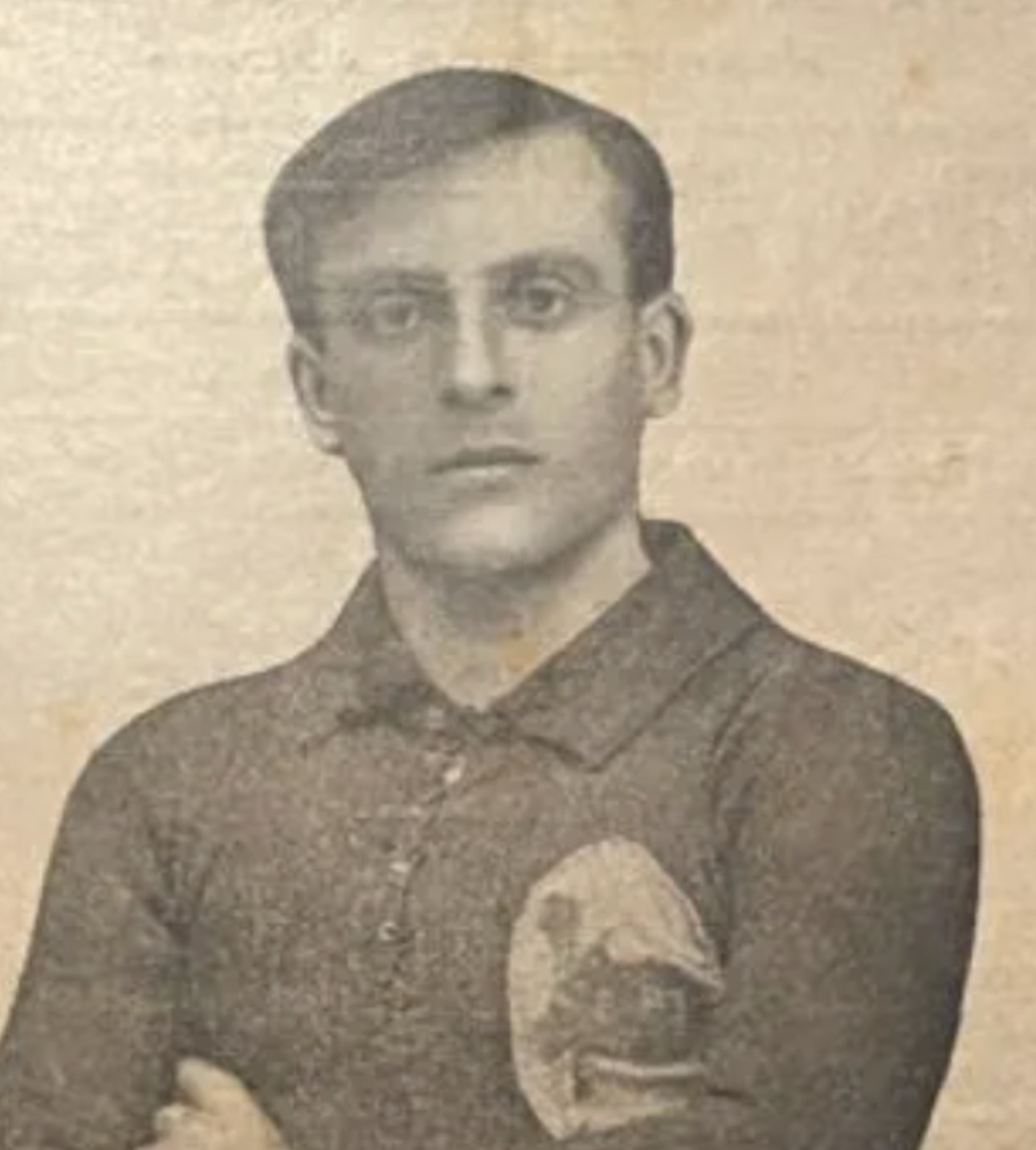

Personal information
- Full name: Antonio Baró
- Place of birth: Barcelona, Catalonia, Spain
- Position: Midfielder

Senior career*
Years	Team	Apps	(Gls)
1911–1917	FC Espanya	83	(19)

International career
1915	Catalonia	2	(1)
Medal record
Catalonia
Prince of Asturias Cup
Silver medal – second place	1915 Prince of Asturias Cup	Team
- * Club domestic league appearances and goals

Antonio Baró was a Spanish footballer who played as a midfielder for FC Espanya and the Catalonia national football team in the 1910s.

== Club career ==
Born in Catalonia, Baró began his career at his hometown club FC Espanya in the early-1910s, where he formed an attacking partnership with Gabriel Bau and Casimiro Mallorquí, and quickly became a key element of the team, going on to play with them for nearly a decade. He was one of the most important players in the team's rise to become a powerhouse in Catalonia, competing head-to-head against the likes of Barcelona and Espanyol, being crucial in helping the club win three Catalan championships (1912–13, 1913–14 and 1916–17) and the 1914 Pyrenees Cup, scoring once in the semifinals against FC Barcelona in an eventual 5–2 victory.

Baró also scored once in the semifinals of the 1914 Copa del Rey against Sociedad Gimnástica, netting a late equalizer in the second leg to give Espanya a 2–1 aggregate win, thus contributing decisively in helping the club reach the final, which still is the club's only Copa del Rey final appearance, but they lost 1–2 to Athletic Bilbao, courtesy of a brace from Severino Zuazo.

== International career ==
Like many other FC Espanya players of that time, Baró played several matches for the Catalonia national team, being a member of the Catalan side that played in the first edition of the Prince of Asturias Cup in 1915, an inter-regional competition organized by the RFEF. At the tournament, he formed an attacking partnership with the forwards of FC Barcelona, Vicente Martínez, Enrique Peris, and Paulino Alcántara, the latter scoring the competition's first-ever goal against the Centro team (a Castile/Madrid XI) on 10 May, while Baró netted the winner in a 2–1 victory. In the end, however, Catalonia lost the title to the Basque Country.

== Honours ==
=== Club ===
FC Espanya

- Catalan championship:
  - Champions (3): 1912–13, 1913–14 and 1916–17
- Copa del Rey:
  - Runner-up (1): 1914
- Pyrenees Cup:
  - Champions (1): 1914

=== International ===
Catalonia

- Prince of Asturias Cup:
  - Runner-up (1): 1915
