= 1914 Copa del Rey final =

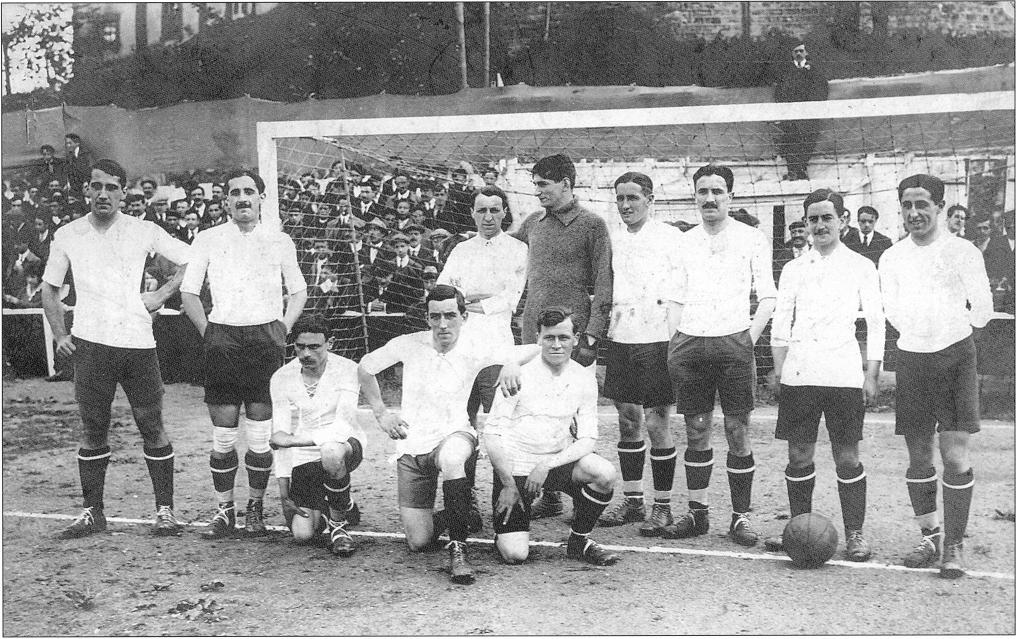
- Athletic Bilbao team of 1914
- Event: 1914 Copa del Rey
Athletic Bilbao	España FC
2	1
- Date: 10 May 1914
- Venue: Costorbe, Irun
- Man of the Match: Severino Zuazo
- Referee: (England) Mr. Rowland

The 1914 Copa del Rey final was the 14th final of the Spanish cup competition, the Copa del Rey. The final was played at Costorbe in Irun on 10 May 1914. The match was won by Athletic Bilbao, who beat España FC 2–1. The star of the match was Severino Zuazo, who scored the goals that gave the cup to Athletic, while Jaime Villena reduced the deficit for España (a club from Barcelona, but separate from RCD Espanyol) with two minutes remaining.

== Match details ==
10 May 1914
16:30

Athletic Bilbao	2–1	España FC
Zuazo 20', 29'	Report1; Report2	Villena 88'

Costorbe, Irun
Referee: (England) Mr. Rowland

Athletic Bilbao	España FC

GK	1	(Spain) Cecilio Ibarreche
DF	2	(Spain) Luis María Solaun
DF	3	(Spain) Luis Hurtado
MF	4	(Spain) Esteban Eguía
MF	5	(Spain) José María Belauste
MF	6	(Spain) Luis Iceta (c)
FW	7	(Spain) Germán Echevarría
FW	8	(Spain) Pichichi
FW	9	(Spain) Severino Zuazo
FW	10	(Spain) Alfonso González "Apón"
FW	11	(Spain) Ramón Belauste

GK	1	(Spain) Juan Puig
DF	2	(Spain) Prat
DF	3	(Spain) Enrique Mariné
MF	4	(Spain) Pantaleón Salvó I
MF	5	(Spain) Hermenegild Casellas
MF	6	(Spain) Cristóbal Salvó II
FW	7	(Spain) Coletas
FW	8	(Spain) Antonio Baró
FW	9	(Spain) Jaime Bellavista
FW	10	(Spain) Mario Passani
FW	11	(Spain) Jaime Villena

Copa del Rey
1914 winners
Athletic Bilbao
5th title
