= Pantaleón Salvó =

Spanish footballer

Personal information
- Full name: Pantaleón Salvó Saura
- Birth name: Pantaleó Salvó Saura
- Date of birth: Unknown
- Place of birth: Barcelona, Catalonia, Spain
- Date of death: Unknown
- Positions: Midfielder; forward

Senior career*
Years	Team	Apps	(Gls)
1911–1918	FC Espanya		
1918–1919	RCD Espanyol		
- * Club domestic league appearances and goals

Pantaleón Salvó Saura, also known as Salvó II, was a Spanish footballer who played as a midfielder and forward for FC Espanya and RCD Espanyol. His brother Cristóbal had a great career with FC Espanya. The dates of his birth and death are unknown.

== Club career ==
Born in Catalonia, he began his career at his hometown club FC Espanya in the early-1910s, playing with them for nearly a decade. Together with his brother, he helped the club win three Catalan championships (1912–13, 1913–14 and 1916–17) and reach the 1914 Copa del Rey Final, which still is the club's only Copa del Rey final appearance, but they lost 1–2 to Athletic Club, courtesy of a brace from Severino Zuazo.

He also helped Espanya win the 1914 Pyrenees Cup, netting two goals in the final to help his side to a 3–1 victory over Cométe et Simot. In 1918 he followed his brother Cristóbal to RCD Espanyol, where he presumably retired.

== Honours ==
=== Club ===
FC Espanya

- Catalan championship:
  - Champions (3): 1912–13, 1913–14 and 1916–17
- Copa del Rey:
  - Runner-up (1): 1914
- Pyrenees Cup:
  - Champions (1): 1914
