= Luis Bru (footballer) =

Spanish footballer

Personal information
- Full name: Luis Bru Masipó
- Birth name: Lluís Bru i Masipó
- Date of birth: 13 August 1892
- Place of birth: Barcelona, Catalonia, Spain
- Date of death: 23 May 1972 (aged 79)
- Place of death: Barcelona, Catalonia, Spain
- Position: Goalkeeper

Senior career*
Years	Team	Apps	(Gls)
1910–1913	International FC		
1913	RCD Espanyol		
1913–1919	FC Barcelona	219	

International career
1913–1916	Catalonia	+4	(0)
Medal record
Catalonia
Prince of Asturias Cup
Silver medal – second place	1915 Prince of Asturias Cup	Team
- * Club domestic league appearances and goals

Luis Bru Masipó (13 August 1892 – 23 May 1972), born Lluís, was a Spanish footballer who played as a goalkeeper for FC Barcelona. He was the first goalkeeper in Spain to play "the English style", which consisted of blocking the ball instead of kicking the ball away. He is best known for his heroics in the semifinals of the 1916 Copa del Rey between Barcelona and Madrid FC, in which he saved three penalties in two matches.

== Club career ==
Born in Catalonia, he began his career in 1909 in a non-federated team. In 1910, he joined International FC, initially playing as a left midfielder until 1912, when in a match where the goalkeeper was missing, he occupied this position on the pitch, and his performance was so impressive that from then on he always played as a goalkeeper. In 1913 he signed for RCD Espanyol, but his spell at the club was cut short as Barcelona signed him at the end of the year, making his debut on 7 December 1913. In first season at the club, he ousted the great Luís Reñé. He played for Barça for nearly a decade (1913–22), playing a total of 219 matches, serving as the team captain, and helping the club win 2 Catalan championships in 1915–16 and 1918–19, and to reach the 1919 Copa del Rey Final, in which he conceded 5 goals in a 2–5 loss to Arenas Club.

One of his most remembered performances was during the semifinals of the 1916 Copa del Rey between Barcelona and Madrid FC, which ended in a remarkable six-goal tie, but Barça was punished with three penalties, of which Bru saved two, one of which with his head. These penalties were all given by referee José Berraondo, a former Madrid player, and the first two were taken by Sotero Aranguren and Santiago Bernabéu, a future Madrid president, who converted the third in the 118th minute. Some sources state that Bru himself scored an own goal in the first half. In the subsequent replay, Berraondo once again gave a last-minute penalty with the scores tied at 2, but Bru, living up to his fame, saved again to force extra-time, in which Sotero scored twice, although the Barcelona players protested that the Madrid attackers had grabbed Bru in the second goal, but Berraondo ignored and Barcelona withdrew in protest.

In 1919, with the arrival of Ricardo Zamora at the club, Bru lost his place in the starting line-up, and so, on 19 October 1919, he was the subject of a tribute match along with Eduardo Reguera, which took place at the Camp de la Indústria between Barça and FC Espanya, ending in a 2–2 draw.

A couplet is remembered about Lluis. "Saint Peter himself / can be treated as you / as goalkeeper / by the Catalan Luis Bru."

== International career ==
Like many other FC Barcelona players of that time, Bru was summoned to play for the Catalan national team several times between 1913 and 1916. In May 1915, he was a member of the Catalan team that participated in the first edition of the Prince of Asturias Cup in 1915, an inter-regional competition organized by the RFEF.

== Retirement ==
In 1929 a tribute festival was held in honor of Luis Bru, who was suffering from a serious illness, with several athletic tests and a football match in which Barcelona beat a Catalan team by 2 to 1.

== Honours ==
Barcelona

- Catalan championship:
  - Champions (1): 1915–16 and 1918–19
- Copa del Rey:
  - Runner-up (1): 1919

=== International ===
Catalonia

- Prince of Asturias Cup:
  - Runner-up (1): 1915
