= 1916 Copa del Rey =

16th Copa del Rey

Tournament details
- Country: Spain
- Teams: 3

Final positions
- Champions: Athletic Bilbao (7th title)
- Runners-up: Madrid FC

Tournament statistics
- Matches played: 5
- Goals scored: 30 (6 per match)

The Copa del Rey 1916 was the 16th staging of the Copa del Rey, the Spanish football cup competition.

The competition started on 26 March 1916, and concluded on 7 May 1916, with the final, held at the Camp de la Indústria in Barcelona, in which Athletic Bilbao lifted the trophy for the 7th time ever with a 4–0 victory over Madrid FC, with a hat-trick from Félix Zubizarreta. It was Athletic's third title in a row, thus gaining the right to keep the trophy. However, this tournament is best known for its El Clásico in the semi-finals which saw Madrid FC and FC Barcelona go head-to-head for the first time in 14 years in the competition's history, and the two sides were only separated after four thrilling matches including a dramatic 6–6 draw with extra-time and hat-tricks from the likes of Bernabéu and Alcántara.

== Teams ==
- North Region: Athletic Bilbao
- Centre Region: Madrid FC
- South Region: Español de Cádiz
- Galicia Region: Fortuna de Vigo
- Catalonia Region: FC Barcelona

Fortuna de Vigo (Champions of Galicia) and Español de Cádiz (Champions of Andalusia) withdrew before the draw.

== Semifinal ==
=== First leg ===
26 March 1916

FC Barcelona	2–1	Madrid FC
Alcántara 39'; Martínez 85'	Report	Petit 17'

Camp del carrer Muntaner, Barcelona
Referee: Leandro Aguirreche

=== Second leg ===
2 April 1916

Madrid FC	4–1	FC Barcelona
Bernabéu 35' (pen.), 40', 60'; Petit 80'	Report	Martínez 20'

Campo de O'Donnell, Madrid
Referee: Ezequiel Montero

FC Barcelona and Madrid CF won one match each. At that time, the goal difference was not taken into account.

=== First replay ===
13 April 1916

Madrid CF	6–6 (a.e.t.)	FC Barcelona
Belaunde 2', 55', 87'; Bernabéu 23', 98', 118' (pen.)	Report	Alcántara 15', 30', 102'; Mallorqui 67'; Bau 70'; Martínez 112'

Campo de O'Donnell (Atlético Madrid), Madrid
Referee: José Berraondo

=== Second replay ===
15 April 1916

Madrid FC	4–2 (Note: The match was abandoned in the 113th minute, with Madrid FC leading 4–2, after FC Barcelona walked off the field in protest against the refereeing.) (a.e.t.)	FC Barcelona
Bernabéu 25'; Zabalo 85'; Aranguren 100', 108'	Report	Martínez 11', 38'

Campo de O'Donnell (Atlético Madrid), Madrid
Referee: José Berraondo

== Final ==
7 May 1916
16:00 CET

Athletic Bilbao	4–0	Madrid FC
Acedo 12'; Zubizarreta 23', 60', 69'

Camp de la Indústria, Barcelona
Attendance: 6,000
Referee: Francisco Bru
