= Eduardo Reguera =

Spanish footballer

Personal information
- Full name: Eduardo Reguera Andreu
- Birth name: Eduard Reguera i Andreu
- Date of birth: 13 October 1891
- Place of birth: Barcelona, Catalonia, Spain
- Date of death: 20 December 1977 (aged 86)
- Place of death: Barcelona, Catalonia, Spain
- Position: Defender

Senior career*
Years	Team	Apps	(Gls)
1910–1914	FC Espanya		
1914–1920	FC Barcelona	194	(2)

International career
1915	Catalonia	+3	(1)
Medal record
Catalonia
Prince of Asturias Cup
Silver medal – second place	1915 Prince of Asturias Cup	Team
- * Club domestic league appearances and goals

Eduardo Reguera Andreu (13 October 1891 – 20 December 1977) was a Spanish footballer who played as a defender for FC Espanya and FC Barcelona. Reguera was one of the most important footballers in the amateur beginnings of FC Espanya, being a pivotal piece in turning FC Espanya into an important team in Catalonia. He then joined rivals Barcelona, with whom he played for six years between 1914 and 1920, helping the club win three Catalan Championships and one Copa del Rey in 1920.

== Club career ==
Born in Barcelona, he began his career in 1910 at his hometown club FC Espanya de Barcelona, where he formed a great defensive partnership with Hermenegild Casellas. Unlike most teams, whose sources of power is either the attack or the midfield, FC Espanya's biggest strength was this back-line, which was the fundamental piece behind the team's rise in Catalonia, competing head-to-head against the likes of Barcelona and Espanyol, and winning two back-to-back Catalan championships in 1912–13 and 1913–14, thus qualifying to the Copa del Rey in which he helped the club reach the 1914 Copa del Rey Final, which still stands as the only cup final of the club's history, but Reguera missed it due to injury and without him, FC Espanya were beaten 1–2 by Athletic Bilbao.

His great defensive performances eventually drew the attention of FC Barcelona, who signed him in 1914. At Barça, he teamed up with goalkeeper Luis Bru, and helped the club win three Catalan championships (1915–16, 1918–19 and 1919–20) and to reach the 1919 Copa del Rey Final, in which his defense conceded 5 goals in a 2–5 loss to Arenas Club. This humiliation caused him to lose his place in the starting line-up, and so, on 19 October 1919, he was the subject of a tribute match along with Luis Bru, which took place at the Camp de la Indústria between Barça and FC Espanya, ending in a 2–2 draw. In total, he played 235 matches and scored 6 goals, although only 74 games and 1 were official.

At the end of the twenties, he promoted the Barça football school, trained the lower categories of the club, and served as second coach of the first team.

== International career ==
Like many other FC Barcelona players of that time, Reguera played a few matches for the Catalan national team in 1915, netting one goal in a 2–2 draw with Basque Country on 7 February 1915. Reguera was a member of the side that participated in the first edition of the Prince of Asturias Cup, an inter-regional competition organized by the RFEF.

== Honours ==
=== Club ===
FC Espanya

- Catalan championship:
  - Champions (1): 1912–13 and 1913–14
- Pyrenees Cup:
  - Champions (1): 1914
- Copa del Rey:
  - Runner-up (1): 1914

FC Barcelona

- Catalan championship:
  - Champions (3): 1915–16, 1918–19 and 1919–20
- Copa del Rey:
  - Runner-up (1): 1919

=== International ===
Catalonia

- Prince of Asturias Cup:
  - Runner-up (1): 1915
