= José Maria Canals =

Spanish doctor and footballer

Personal information
- Full name: José Maria Canals Carbó
- Birth name: Josep Maria Canals i Carbó
- Date of birth: 21 June 1898
- Place of birth: Tarragona, Spain
- Date of death: 17 February 1951 (aged 52)
- Place of death: Barcelona, Catalonia, Spain
- Position: Defender

Youth career
- 1912–1914: Gimnàstic de Tarragona

Senior career*
Years	Team	Apps	(Gls)
1914–1917	University SC		
1917–1926	RCD Espanyol		

International career
1922–1924	Catalonia	2	(0)
- * Club domestic league appearances and goals

José Maria Canals Carbó (21 June 1898 – 17 February 1951) was a Spanish doctor and footballer who played as a defender for Espanyol.

== Club career ==
José Maria Canals was born on 21 June 1898 in Tarragona, and began playing football in the youth ranks of a hometown club, the football team of Gimnàstic de Tarragona. When he moved to Barcelona he joined University SC, first in the reserve team and later in the first team. At Espanyol he started playing on the left wing, later moving to defense, where he formed a great partnership with Eugenio Montesinos, and became an undisputed starter. They kept many clean-sheets together, partly also thanks to having behind them the best goalkeeper of his time, Ricardo Zamora. In total, he played 64 official matches in ten seasons. In 1926 he retired from football to devote himself to medicine, becoming a renowned doctor and for several years, he carried out this task within the club.

On 10 July 1927, Canals was the subject of a tribute match along with Casimiro Mallorquí, which took place at the Sarrià Stadium between Catalonia and RCD Espanyol, playing for the latter in a 4–1 victory.

== International career ==
Like many other RCD Espanyol players of that time, Canals was eligible to play for the Catalan national team, and in November 1922, he was a member of the team that participated in the fifth edition of the Prince of Asturias Cup in 1922–23, an inter-regional competition organized by the RFEF. He started in the quarterfinals as a defender alongside club teammate Montesinos, keeping a clean-sheet in a 3–0 victory over Gipuzkoa. In the semifinals, held in January, neither he nor Montesinos were called up and as a result, Catalonia was knocked-out by Asturias. Canals received his second cap for Catalonia in 1924.

== Honours ==
RCD Espanyol

- Catalan Championships:
  - Winners (1) 1917–18
