= Jaime Villena =

Spanish footballer and referee (1897–1975)

Personal information
- Full name: Jaime Villena Gascó
- Date of birth: 19 April 1897
- Place of birth: Barcelona, Spain
- Date of death: 28 March 1975 (aged 77)
- Place of death: Spain
- Position(s): Forward

Senior career*
Years	Team	Apps	(Gls)
1913–1921	FC Espanya		
- *Club domestic league appearances and goals

Jaime Villena Gascó (19 April 1897 – 28 March 1975) was a Spanish footballer who played as a forward for FC Espanya. He spent all his playing career with FC Espanya, thus being a historical club member and part of the so-called one-club men group.

He also worked as a referee in the 1920s.

== Playing career ==
Born in Catalonia, Villena began his career at his hometown club FC Espanya in 1913, aged just 16, where he quickly became one of the club's most important players. In his first season with them, he helped them win the 1913–14 Catalan championship and 1914 Pyrenees Cup, starting in both the semifinals against FC Barcelona (5–2) and in the final against French side Cométe et Simot (3–1). He also helped Espanya reach their first (and only) Copa del Rey final on 10 May 1914, but they failed to complete the treble because of a 1–2 loss to Athletic Bilbao, in which Villena scored Espanya's consolation goal in the 89th minute, (Note: Some sources wrongly state that this goal was actually scored by Coletas.) becoming, at the age of 17 years and 22 days, the youngest final goalscorer in the competition's history, a record that he still holds.

Villena stayed with Espanya for eight years, from 1913 until his retirement in 1921, aged 24.

== Refereeing career ==
Shortly after his retirement in 1921, Villena became a referee, overseeing several matches in the Catalan Championship between 1921 and 1928, as well as 11 league matches between 1928 and 1930, including 9 matches in the Segunda División and two in the 1929–30 La Liga. On 9 November 1924, he awarded a second-half penalty kick to Terrassa in a Catalan Championship match against Sants, which was successfully converted by Domingo Broto to seal a 4–2 win for Terrassa.

== Death ==
Villena died on 28 March 1975, at the age of 77.

== Honours ==
FC Espanya

- Catalan championship:
  - Champions (2): 1913–14 and 1916–17
- Copa del Rey:
  - Runner-up (1): 1914
- Pyrenees Cup:
  - Champions (1): 1914
