= Augusto Ozores =

Puerto Rican footballer

Personal information
- Full name: Augusto Vicente Calixto Ozores Iriarte
- Date of birth: 14 October 1893
- Place of birth: San Juan, Puerto Rico
- Date of death: 19 November 1973 (aged 80)
- Place of death: Barcelona, Spain
- Position: Forward

Senior career*
Years	Team	Apps	(Gls)
1910–1910	Universitari SC		
1914–1917	FC Barcelona		

International career
1915	Catalonia	2	(0)
- * Club domestic league appearances and goals

Augusto Vicente Calixto Ozores Iriarte (14 October 1893 – 19 November 1973) was a Puerto Rican footballer who played as a forward for FC Barcelona in the 1910s. He also played two matches for the Catalan national team in 1915.

Historically, his name was mistakenly thought to be Miguel Ozores.

== Early life ==
Augusto Ozores was born in San Juan, Puerto Rico, on 14 October 1893, as the son of Vicente Ozores Nieva, a Galician sailor, and the Puerto Rican María Iriarte Solís. After Spain lost Puerto Rico in 1898, the Ozores family emigrated to A Coruña, where the paternal family resided, later settling in Barcelona. However, he was a naturalized American citizen for most of his life.

== Career ==
Whilst in the Catalan capital, Ozores began his football career at Universitari SC in 1910, aged 17, remaining there for four years, until 1914, when he was signed by FC Barcelona, with whom he played for three years, until 1917, scoring a total of 8 goals in 33 matches (including friendlies) and winning the 1916 Catalan championship. In November 1912, he played two friendlies for Universitari against Madrid FC (currently known as Real Madrid), helping his side win the latter 3–2. He also played two matches for the Catalan national team in 1915, both being friendlies against the Gipuzkoa, the first on 31 October and the second on 1 November, which ended in a win and a draw, respectively. He was thus the first-ever Puerto Rican to play in Europe, beating Eduardo Ordoñez to that honor.

In the 1916–17 season, Ozores scored against Athletic Bilbao on two occasions, both friendlies. In 1917, he already was a naturalized American citizen, thus being in the same irregular situation regarding foreigners as his teammate, the Filipino Juan de Garchitorena, whose alignment in a Catalan Championship match in which Ozores also played was denounced by Espanyol (Ozores' nationality went unnoticed), which resulted in the Blaugrana club withdrawing from the competition that was eventually won by Espanyol.

== Later and personal life ==
Ozores was registered as a possible combatant for both World Wars, first in Puerto Rico in 1917, and then in New York City in 1942, but he ended up not taking part in either conflict. In 1920, Ozores married Luisa Graner, daughter of the painter Luis Graner, and moved to the United States.

== Death ==
Ozores died in Barcelona on 19 November 1973, at the age of 80.

== Honours ==
FC Barcelona

- Catalan championship: 1915–16
