= Nothing More Than a Woman =

- Directed by: Harry Lachman
- Written by: Stuart Anthony; Lester Cole; Enrique Jardiel Poncela; John Reinhardt; Raymond Van Sickley; Miguel de Zárraga
- Produced by: John Stone
- Starring: Berta Singerman; Alfredo del Diestro; Juan Torena
- Cinematography: Rudolph Maté
- Music by: Samuel Kaylin
- Production company: Fox Film Corporation
- Distributed by: Fox Film Corporation
- Release date: November 23, 1934
- Running time: 81 minutes
- Country: United States
- Language: Spanish

Nothing More Than a Woman (Spanish: Nada más que una mujer) is a 1934 American drama film directed by Harry Lachman and starring Berta Singerman, Alfredo del Diestro and Juan Torena. It is the Spanish-language version of Fox's Pursued (1934).

== Cast ==
- Berta Singerman as Mona Estrada
- Alfredo del Diestro as Julio Franchoni
- Juan Torena as David Landeen
- Luana Alcañiz as Gilda
- Lucio Villegas as Doctor Steiner
- Carmen Rodríguez as Madame Lascar
- Julian Rivero as Hansen
- Frazer Acosta as Ali
- Juan Ola as Native
- James Dime as Native

== Bibliography ==
- Jarvinen, Lisa. The Rise of Spanish-language Filmmaking: Out from Hollywood's Shadow, 1929-1939. Rutger's University Press, 2012.
