= Berta Singerman =

Belarusian-Argentine singer and actress (1901–1998)

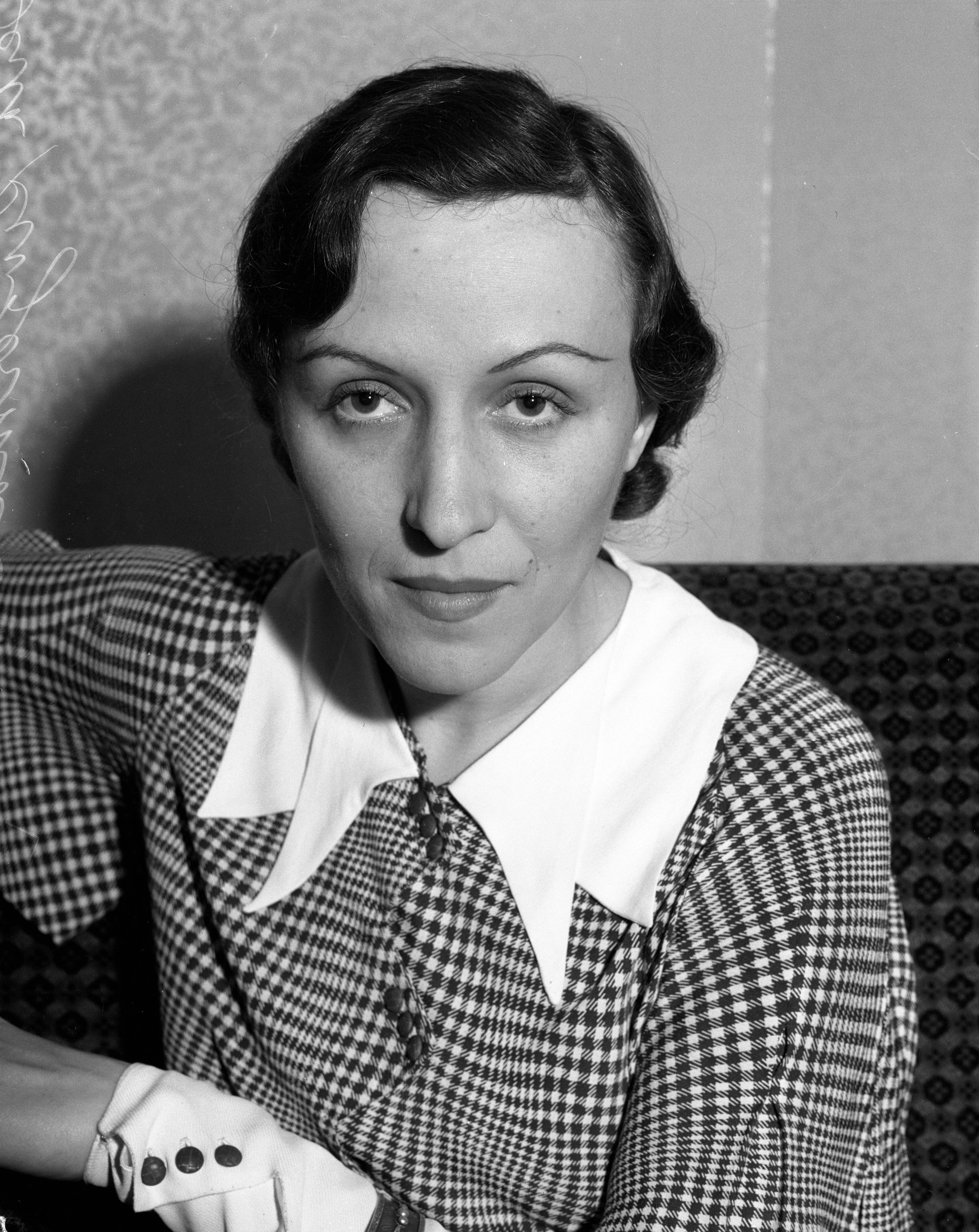
- Born: 9 September 1901; Minsk, Russian Empire
- Died: 10 December 1998 (aged 97); Buenos Aires, Argentina

Berta Singerman Begun (Belarusian: Берта Сінгерман; 9 September 1901 – 10 December 1998), better known as Berta Singerman, was an Argentine singer and actress.

== Biography ==
Singerman was born in Minsk, then part of the Russian Empire into a Jewish family. She emigrated to Argentina with her parents when she was a little girl. From a young age, she performed dramatic works with her siblings and neighbours that she was responsible for directing. When she was eight she joined a company that made melodramas in Yiddish, and when she was ten years old she joined a cast that performed works of August Strindberg. At age 15, Singerman married Rubén Enrique Stolek, who became her manager and set her on a career of literary declamation. Her connections with highly regarded literary figures, including poet Alfonsina Storni and writer Horacio Quiroga, helped propel this career into international fame, and she was befriended by numerous writers and artists, including Pablo Neruda, Juan Ramón Jiménez, Gabriela Mistral and Alejo Carpentier. By the 1930s, Singerman was performing throughout the Spanish- and Portuguese-speaking world, including Spain, Mexico and Brazil, at times attracting huge crowds. Her career lasted into the 1980s.

== Selected filmography ==
- Nothing More Than a Woman (1934)
