= La cruz y la espada =

1934 American Spanish language drama film directed by Frank R. Strayer

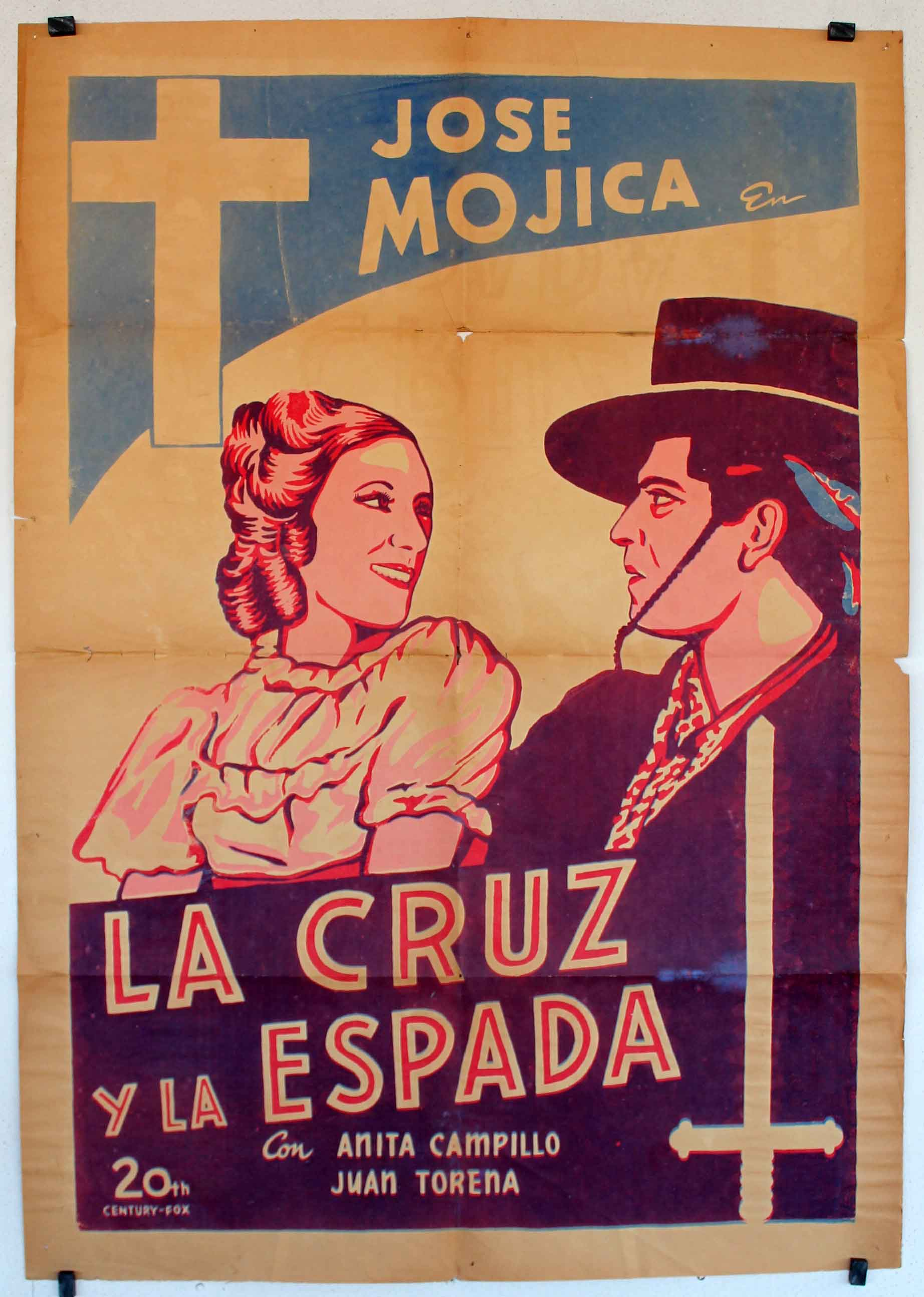
- Poster for the film
- Directed by: Frank Strayer
- Screenplay by: Paul Schofield; William DuBois
- Story by: Miguel de Zárraga
- Produced by: John Stone
- Starring: José Mojica; Juan Torena; Anita Campillo
- Music by: Samuel Kaylin
- Production company: Fox Film Corporation
- Distributed by: Fox Film Corporation
- Release date: February 1, 1934 (US)
- Running time: 73 minutes
- Country: United States
- Language: Spanish

La cruz y la espada is a 1934 American Spanish language drama film directed by Frank Strayer, which stars José Mojica, Juan Torena, and Anita Campillo. The screenplay was written by Paul Schofield and William DuBois from a story by Miguel de Zárraga.

== Plot ==
In the California of the late 1800s, José Antonio Romero hears of the nearby discovery of gold. Wanting to provide his fiancé, Carmela, with all the good things in life, he decides to go hunt for gold. He tells his friend, Francisco, who is a Brother at a nearby mission, of his intentions and the reason. Carmela, who also lives near the mission, is having second thoughts about her relationship with José. When she is kidnapped by bandits, Francisco, who is unaware that she is his friend's fiancé, goes off to her rescue. After freeing her, the two begin to have an attraction for each other. When Francisco realizes she is José's beloved, he begins to distance himself, although he is attracted to her.

Carmela, equally attracted to Francisco, is dismayed to learn that he is a member of the religious order. When one of the miners, Jaime, arrives at the mission and tells Francisco that Estaban, another miner, has been stabbed at the mining camp, Francisco does not hesitate to head out to the camp to render aid. On his return, he is forced to seek shelter in a cave due to a sudden storm. While in the cave, he accidentally discovers a large vein of gold. He struggles with his desire for Carmela, who he fantasizes about living happily ever after if he took the gold, left the religious order, and married her. In the end, his commitment to his religious devotion wins out, and he decides to tell his friend José the gold's location.

However, José has been told by another villager of the seeming infatuation growing between Francisco and Carmela. Consumed by jealousy, José confronts Francisco, accusing him of betraying their friendship. He attacks the Brother with a knife, but in the ensuing fight, Francisco convinces José that nothing untoward occurred between him and Carmela, and José asks for his friend's forgiveness.

Now able to support his fiancé, José asks Francisco to sing at his wedding, which Francisco gladly does.

== Cast list ==
- José Mojica as Hermano Francisco
- Juan Torena as José Antonio Romero
- Anita Campillo as Carmela
- Lucio Villegas as Padre Superior
- Carmen Rodríguez as Tía Mónica
- Paco Moreno as Hermano Pedro
- Carlos Montalbán as Esteban
- Martín Garralaga as Jaime
- Julián Rivero as El Mestizo
- F. A. Armenta as the Indian
- Rudolph Galante as Vaquero
- Soledad Jiménez as Senora Moreno

== Production ==
In December 1933 it was revealed that Miguel de Zárraga, Paul Schofield, and William DuBois were writing the original screenplay for the film. Also announced was that Ernesto Lecuona, José Mojica, and Troy Sanders would be composing music for the film. The picture was the first of several scheduled by Fox Pictures, after a renewed interest in producing Spanish language films for the Latin American market, rather than simply releasing English language films with subtitle.
