= Storm Over the Andes =

1935 film by Christy Cabanne

- Film poster
- Directed by: Christy Cabanne
- Written by: Eliot Gibbons; Christy Cabanne; Albert DeMond; Frank Wead; Eve Greene; Rose Franken; Dore Schary
- Produced by: Maurice Pivar
- Starring: Jack Holt; Antonio Moreno; Mona Barrie
- Cinematography: Harry Forbes; Charles J. Stumar
- Edited by: Maurice Wright
- Music by: Heinz Roemheld; Clifford Vaughan
- Production company: Universal Pictures
- Distributed by: Universal Pictures
- Release date: April 1, 1935
- Running time: 82 minutes
- Country: United States
- Language: English

Storm Over the Andes (aka Alas sobre El Chaco) is a 1935 American adventure film directed by Christy Cabanne and starring Jack Holt, Antonio Moreno and Mona Barrie. The low-budget programmer is set against the backdrop of the Chaco War between Paraguay and Bolivia. A separate Spanish-language version, titled Alas Sobre El Chaco, also directed by Cabanne, was made.

== Plot ==
Cynical pilot Captain Robert Kent has been hired on as a mercenary for Bolivia in their war with Paraguay. Major Manuel Tovar in charge of the men at Entre Rios where Kent is assigned, grounds Kent for dangerous flying. Kent also makes an enemy of Mitchell, another flyer, when he flirts with Mitchell's girl Juanita, giving her a distinctive snake ring, one of many he has cynically given out. Tovar says nothing is more wonderful than giving your love to one woman forever.

When Paraguayan bombers fly over Entre Rios, everyone except Kent prepares to attack. Determined to fly, Kent knocks out Mitchell and takes his place. Kent is slightly wounded in the attack, and he is sent to the hospital in La Paz to recuperate. Tovar forgives him for disobeying orders. Against his nurse's orders, Kent leaves the hospital to take part in a fiesta, where he meets a beautiful and mysterious woman named Teresa. He gives her one of his snake rings. This time, Kent has fallen in love, he tries to take back the ring, but Teresa begs to keep it as a memento. She slips off before he can learn where she lives.

The next day, Tovar arrives in La Paz to celebrate his wedding anniversary and bring Kent back to Entre Rios. Kent learns that Teresa is Tovar's wife. Tovar finds the snake ring that Kent gave Teresa, then overhears the two of them talking on the balcony and assumes that they had an affair. Tovar refuses to listen to Teresa's explanations

Flying back to the front, Tovar tries to kill himself and Kent diving their aircraft toward earth before Kent wrestles the controls away from him. After landing, Kent tries to convince Tovar that nothing happened between him and Teresa. Remaining unconvinced, Tovar flies a suicide mission and is shot down behind enemy lines.

Teresa flies to Entre Rios to try to save her marriage and begs Kent to rescue her husband. Kent parachutes into the jungle and brings Tovar to safety. At a Paraguayan airstrip, they see flying ace El Zorro who is called "the fox who flies like an eagle". Catching El Zorro warming up his bomber, the pair take control. Tovar bombs the Paraguayan ammunition warehouse, but when the warehouse is destroyed, and they turn the aircraft toward home, Mitchell, who has vowed to destroy El Zorro, attacks. Not knowing his own men are inside the aircraft, Mitchell wounds Kent in the attack.

Tovar and Teresa, now reconciled, rush Kent to a hospital in La Paz where it appears that he will recover.

== Cast ==
- Jack Holt as Bob Kent
- Antonio Moreno as Maj. Tovar Rojas
- Mona Barrie as Theresa
- Gene Lockhart as Cracker
- Grant Withers as Mitchell
- Barry Norton as Diaz
- George J. Lewis as Garcia
- Juanita Garfias as Pepita
- Luis Díaz Flores as Silvera
- Juan Torena as Milano
- Hans Heinrich von Twardowski as Oberto
- José A. Caraballo as Cabello
- Francisco Moreno as Leon
- Alma Real as Nurse
- Francisco Mará as General
- Anita Camargo as Juanita
- José Rubio as El Zorro
- Max Wagner as Sentry
- Carlos Albert as Dancer
- Greta Albert as Dancer
- Ted Billings as Little Man
- Hector De Saa as Mechanic
- Juan Duval as Assistant
- Charles Fallon as Cafe Proprietor
- Eugenia Fause as Waitress
- June Gittelson as Big Woman
- Ruth Gonzales as Barmaid
- Isabel La Mal as Mrs. Livingston
- Victor Lewisas Officer
- Alberto Morin as Intern
- Alfonso Pedroza as El Diablo
- Lucio Villegas as Doctor

== Production ==
Principal photography on Storm Over the Andes took place from June 9 to July 19, 1935.

Stunt pilot Garland Lincoln was hired by Universal Pictures to fly in Storm Over the Andes, using Lincoln's hangar at the Metropolitan Airport, which served as the Bolivian air base. He also provided a number of aircraft for the film including his Garland-Lincoln LF-1. (Note: Some aerial scenes were filmed on location at the Triunfo, California emergency landing field. Photographer Charles Stumar and art director Harrison Wiley were killed in an aircraft accident during preliminary work. Harry Forbes took over the photography.)

== Spanish-language version ==
The Spanish-language version, titled Alas sobre El Chaco (en: Wings Over the Chaco), was also directed by Cabanne, and stars José Crespo, Lupita Tovar and Antonio Moreno. Alas sobre El Chaco was released in November 1935.

== Reception ==
Aviation film historian James H. Farmer in Celluloid Wings: The Impact of Movies on Aviation (1984) described Storm Over the Andes as an "above-average Jack Holt air adventure." Reviewer Hal Erickson noted, "For a man who was reportedly deathly afraid of flying, Jack Holt certainly made more than his share of aviation pictures."
