= Josep Ibarz i Gilart =

Catalan politician

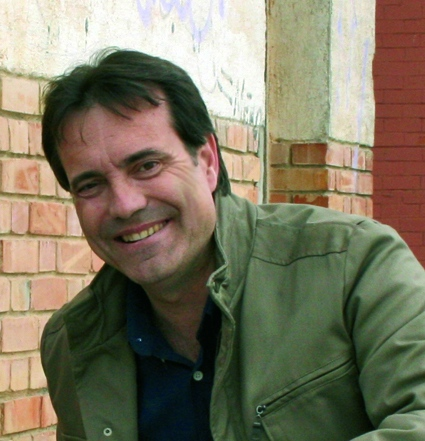

Alcade, Almacelles
- In office 2003–2007
- In office 2007–2011

Personal details
- Born: 1961 (age 64–65) Paris, France
- Party: Democratic Convergence of Catalonia
- Profession: Politician
- Website: Official site

Joseph Ibarz i Gilart (born 1961 in Paris) is a Catalan politician, mayor of Almacelles since 2003. Born in Paris, at age 14 he left the French capital to live in Almacelles with his family. He resides there still, with his wife and daughters.

His political career began in 1987 when he joined the Democratic Convergence of Catalonia and the Catalan Nationalist Youth. Since then he has held various responsibilities within the party. He was a member of the local executive of CDC, the County Executive Segrià, local head of the CDC, Convergence and the National Council, a position he currently holds.

In 1991 he became a local councillor in Almacelles. Gilart was responsible for the Youth, Agriculture and Environment (1991–1995). He was director of the District Council of Segrià during the term of 1999-2003 and vice president in 2003-2007.

In 2003 he won election as mayor of Almacelles. In 2007 he retained his position with an absolute majority and since then also been a member of the Lleida provincial government.

In 2008 he inaugurated a square named in honor of Frederic Godàs d'Almacelles, and in 2009 asked the governments of Catalonia and Aragon to build a line between Monzón and Lleida.
