= Luis Belaunde =

Spanish footballer

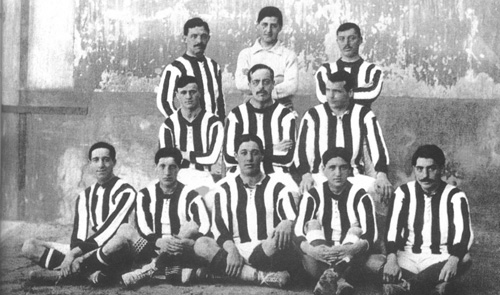
- Belaunde (seated, second from left) with Athletic de Madrid, c. 1911

Personal information
- Full name: Luis Belaunde Prendes
- Date of birth: 4 August 1890
- Place of birth: Gijón, Spain
- Date of death: 21 April 1962 (aged 71)
- Place of death: El Escorial, Spain
- Position: Forward

Senior career*
Years	Team	Apps	(Gls)
1908–1910	Sporting de Gijón		
1910–1916	Athletic de Madrid		
1911–1912	→ Athletic Club (loan)		
1915–1916	→ Madrid FC		
- * Club domestic league appearances and goals

Luis Belaunde Prendes (4 August 1890 – 21 April 1962) was a Spanish footballer who played as a forward for Atlético Madrid, Athletic Bilbao, and Madrid FC in a period of just five years between 1910 and 1915.

He won the 1911 Copa del Rey with Athletic Bilbao, starting and scoring in the final, and was a runner-up with Madrid FC in 1916, losing the final to his former club. In the 1916 cup semifinals, he scored a hat-trick against FC Barcelona to help his side reach the final.

== Early life and education ==
Belaunde was born on 4 August 1890 in Gijón as the son of Luis Belaunde Costa, an industrialist and banker, being the president of the Banco de Crédito Industrial Gijónés, and María Mercedes Prendes, the niece-in-law of the writer Armando Palacio Valdés and daughter of the former mayor of Gijón, Manuel Prendes Hevia. He began playing football for his hometown club Sporting de Gijón. His father, together with Felipe Valdés, the father of another Sporting player, founded the Gijón newspaper El Noroeste. It was a newspaper with a markedly republican character and a certain leftist tendency.

Coming from a well-off family, Belaunde studied at the Colegio de la Inmaculada in Gijón, and played football on its team, Sporting's main rival in the early years. He was then sent to Switzerland to complete his studies.

== Playing career ==
=== Sporting de Gijón ===
Belaunde returned to Asturias in 1908, at the age of 18, and began playing football at Somió FC as well as training with the reserve team of Sporting de Gijón. He eventually earned a spot in the starting eleven, featuring alongside the Buylla brothers (Plácido and Vicente). On 26 October 1910, he was part of the Sporting team that faced Madrid FC (today Real Madrid), helping his side to a 3–0 victory over the meringues. This impressive performance does not go unnoticed and four players of the Sporting Gijón team, including Belaunde, were signed by Athletic de Madrid (as Atlético Madrid were then known).

=== Atlético Madrid and Athletic Bilbao ===
Belaunde adapted quickly to the new club, partly thanks to the help of two former Gijón players, Saturnino and Fernando Villaverde. His own younger brother, Manuel, who also played for Sporting de Gijón, would follow Luis' footsteps and join Atlético as well shortly after.

Together with Manolo Garnica and Roque Allende, among others, he was one of the players that Atlético loaned to his parent club, Athletic Bilbao, for the 1911 Copa del Rey, since the Basque team was forced to replace Sloop and Martin because they had not been residing in Spain for the necessary period of six months. Belaunde ended up playing a crucial role in helping the team win the 1911 Copa del Rey, starting in both the semifinal against Sociedad Gimnástica (2–0) and against RCD Espanyol in the final, where he scored his side's second goal in an eventual 3–1 victory.

Belaunde made his competitive debut with Atlético Madrid on 9 November 1913, the year in which the club finally began to contest the regional championship of Madrid. In total, he played nine regional matches between 1913 and 1915, scoring three goals, two against Madrid FC in January and November of 1914, and the other was a winner against Sociedad Gimnástica on 8 November 1914. In his fifth and last season with Atlético in 1916, he alternated his presence in the line-ups of Atlético and Madrid FC, playing six official matches with the former and two with the latter, thus becoming the first (and only) player in history to play for both of these clubs at the same time. During this period, he trained simultaneously with both clubs, and in fact, he sometimes trained with Madrid in the morning and with Atlético in the afternoon.

=== Madrid FC ===
Just like with Athletic Bilbao, the two matches that Belaunde played for Madrid were both in the Copa del Rey. In the semifinals of the 1916 edition, Madrid faced FC Barcelona in the first competitive El Clásico in 14 years, and since both teams won their home leg, a replay had to be played, so both teams were reinforced; Madrid with Belaunde from Atlético and Casanova from the Toledo Infantry Academy. Belaunde scored a hat-trick, including a last-minute equalizer to make it 4–4 and force extra time, which ended in a 6–6 draw. Regardless, Belaunde was then replaced by Zabalo for the second replay, which ended in a 4–2 victory. He started in the final, in which they faced his former club, Athletic Bilbao, losing 4–0.

== Later life ==
On 18 August 1951, the Minister of Finance Francisco Gómez de Llano confirmed that Belaunde was going to effectively take over as the new Senior Chief of Administration of the General Body of Administration of the Public Treasury.

== Personal life and death ==
Belaunde married Asunción Fernández Montero, a native of Balmaseda, and the couple established their residence in El Escorial. They had one son, Luis Belaunde Fernández (1937–2003).

Belaunde died on 21 April 1962, at the age of 71.

== Honours ==
Athletic Club

- Copa del Rey:
  - Champions (1): 1911

Madrid FC

- Copa del Rey:
  - Runner-up: 1916
