= Estadio de Costorbe =

Football stadium in Irun, Spain

- Location: Irun, Spain
- Owner: Racing Club de Irún
- Surface: Grass

Construction
- Opened: 1910
- Closed: 1926

Costorbe Stadium (Estadio de Costorbe in Spanish) was the football stadium of Racing Club de Irún later Real Unión, a main team in Spanish football before the Second World War. Real Unión was formed in 1915 following the merger of Irún Sporting Club and Racing Club de Irún.

== History ==
Both Irún Sporting Club and Racing Club de Irún had relatively advanced homes. Irún Sporting played at the Estadio de Amute, which was situated just to the north of town in the village of Hondarribia, not far from the current site of Irun's airport. Racing Club de Irún, played at the Campo de Fútbol de Costorbe, which was located on the present day Avenida de Iparralde, around 150m west of Real Unión's present home.

Racing Club de Irún won the 1913 FEF Copa del Rey Final, beating Athletic Bilbao 1–0 in a replay after the first match was drawn 2-2. (Real Unión include this victory in their trophy haul).

The Campo Costorbe also had the honour of hosting the 1914 Copa del Rey Final when Athletic Bilbao defeated FC Espanya de Barcelona with 2–1. Upon forming, Real Unión used Irún Sporting's Campo de Amute.
