= Almacelles =

- Municipality
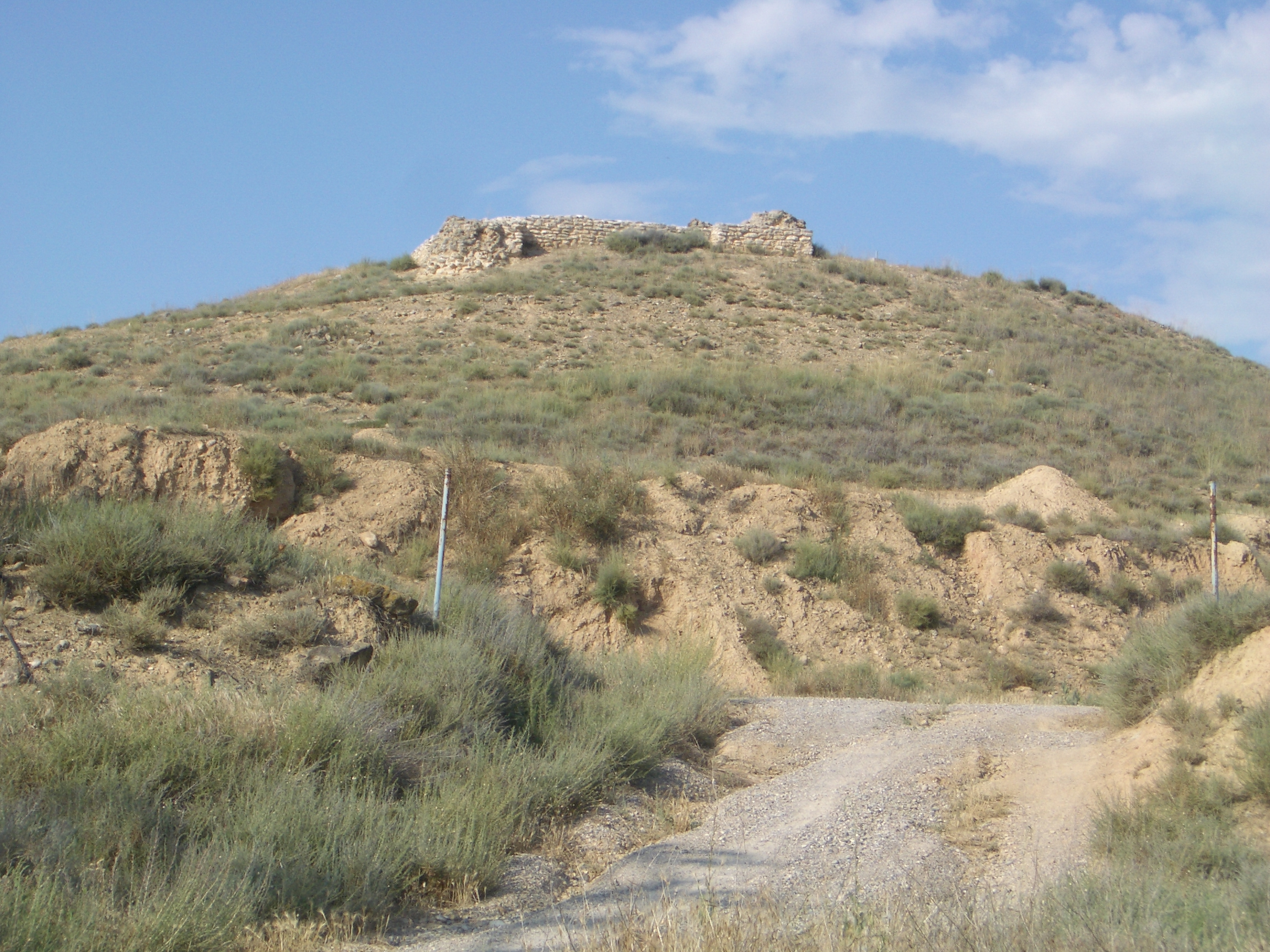
- Caperutxa hill with the remains of Saida castle

- Flag Coat of arms

- Location in Catalonia Almacelles (Catalonia)
- Coordinates: 41°43′57″N 0°26′25″E
- Country: Spain
- Community: Catalonia
- Province: Lleida
- Comarca: Segrià

Government
  - Mayor: Josep Ibarz i Gilart (2015)

Area
  - Total: 49.0 km^{2} (18.9 sq mi)
- Elevation: 247 m (810 ft)

Population (2025-01-01)
  - Total: 7,018
  - Density: 143/km^{2} (371/sq mi)
- Website: almacelles.cat

Almacelles (Catalan pronunciation: [almaˈseʎes]) is a town in the comarca of Segrià, in Catalonia, Spain with a population of 6,800 as of 2016.

It has a population of 7,018 (register office, 2025).
