= Juan Torena =

Spanish footballer and actor (1898–1983)

- Born: Juan de Garchitorena y Carvajal; 24 March 1898; Manila, Captaincy General of the Philippines
- Died: 27 June 1983 (aged 85); Santa Barbara, California, United States
- Citizenship: Spain, United States
- Occupations: Footballer and film actor
- Years active: 1929–1953 (film)
- Organization: Fox Film Corporation
- Height: 1.78 m (5 ft 10 in)
- Spouse: Natalie Moorhead (m. 1957)
- Parents: José Catalino Benigno de Garchitorena y Nieva (father); Fé de Carvajal (mother)
- Relatives: Leopoldo 'Leopoldini' Brías Roxas (brother-in-law)
Association football career
- Position: Forward
Senior career*
Years	Team	Apps	(Gls)
1916–1919	Barcelona	50	(16)
- * Club domestic league appearances and goals

Juan de Garchitorena y Carvajal, also known as Juan Torena (24 March 1898 – 27 June 1983) was a Filipino footballer who played as a forward for Barcelona in the late 1910s, and an American Hollywood actor between the 1930s and the 1950s.

== Early life ==
Garchitorena was born on 24 March 1898 in Manila, Philippines, which at the time was a colony of Spain, to a prosperous merchant Hispanofilipino family, originally from Navarre. In the weeks following his birth, his mother died of childbirth complications and the Spanish–American War broke out, so once the conflict was over, the family moved to Spain, settling in Barcelona, where Torena grew up.

== Playing career ==
In the mid-1910s, Garchitorena began playing for FC Barcelona, where his father worked as a director, featuring alongside his brother José, who only played unofficial matches, and alongside his distant cousin Paulino Alcántara, who became the club's all-time top scorer at the time. He made his debut with the first team on 25 March 1916, one day after turning 18 years old, in a friendly match against Alfonso XIII, but then had to wait several months to make his official debut on 26 November, in a Catalan championship match against Sabadell, scoring in a 4–0 win.

Despite being more interested in partying and socializing, Garchitorena quickly became a regular starter, but his alignment in a handful of games in the 1916–17 Catalan Championship was soon denounced by Espanyol, who sued Barça for improper fielding on the basis that foreigners could not participate in the Catalan championship, thus causing the infamous Garchitorena case, which resulted in the Blaugrana club withdrawing from the competition that was eventually won by Espanyol. Interestingly, however, he was Spanish, as he had been born in Manila, then a colony of Spain, but the head of the Garchitorena family had declared them as Argentine when they arrived in Barcelona, so he was banned by the Spanish league for falsely declaring Argentinian citizenship. Oddly, Garchitorena was starting alongside the naturalized American citizen Augusto Ozores, but his nationality went unnoticed.

== Acting career ==
After retiring from football in 1920, Garchitorena and his older brother, Angel, returned to the Philippines in 1921 to resettle in their homeland, where he looked after the family business. His love of parties and glamour, however, led him to Los Angeles, where he adapted quickly because he had learned English under the American Commonwealth in Manila. His heavy Spanish accent became part of his charm, which allowed him to quickly make several friends, including Douglas Fairbanks and Mary Pickford, the co-founders of United Artists, who encouraged him to make auditions for the studio's new B-class, Latino-film production line, among the first Spanish-language "talkies", which resulted in the birth of Juan Torena, who played the archetypal "Latin lover/gigolo". Between the 1930s and the 1950s, Torena acted in numerous Hollywood films, appearing in both English and Spanish-language versions, including some forgotten 3-H films (Hispanic-Hollywood Hybrid). His notable films included "There Were Thirteen" (1931), "Nothing More Than a Woman", "Storm Over the Andes" (1935), "Captain Calamity" (1936) and "American Guerrilla in the Philippines" (1950).

In 1954, Torena became a U.S. citizen, just one year after his last film.

== Personal life and death ==
Throughout his career, Torena had romances with classic Hollywood actresses, such as Myrna Loy and Natalie Moorhead, marrying the latter.

Torena died in Santa Barbara, California, on 27 June 1983, at the age of 85, and is buried in the Calvary Cemetery, where his tombstone bears both his real and his stage names.

== Filmography ==
- Shadows of Glory (1930)
- Road of Hell (1931)
- There Were Thirteen (1931)
- Nothing More Than a Woman (1934)
- La cruz y la espada (1934)
- Storm Over the Andes (1935)
- The Devil on Horseback (1936)
- Captain Calamity (1936)
- Espionage (1937)
- Mis dos amores (1938)
- American Guerrilla in the Philippines (1950)

== Bibliography ==
- Jarvinen, Lisa. The Rise of Spanish-language Filmmaking: Out from Hollywood's Shadow, 1929-1939. Rutger's University Press, 2012.
