= 1914 Pyrenees Cup =

Tournament details
- Country: Marca Hispanica
- Dates: 1 March – 24 May
- Teams: 6

Final positions
- Champions: FC Espanya (1st title)
- Runner-up: La Comète et Simiot

Tournament statistics
- Matches played: 6
- Goals scored: 36 (6 per match)
- Top goal scorer(s): Jaime Bellavista (5 goals)

The 1914 Pyrenees Cup was the 5th and last tournament of the Pyrenees Cup, one of the first international football club competitions. The competition was held on the road between 1 March and 24 May, and it was won by FC Espanya de Barcelona after beating La Comète et Simiot 3–1 in the final. This was the first time a team other than FC Barcelona won the competition, being finally knocked out by the eventual champions in the semi-finals in an unexpected 2–5 loss.

== Participants ==
The tournament was contested by 7 teams, three from Barcelona, two from Midi-Pyrénées and one each from Côte d'Argent and Sabedell, the latter making their debut in the competition.

Teams	Town
Stade toulousain	Midi-Pyrénées
Union Sportive Albigeoise	Midi-Pyrénées
Comète et Simiot	Côte d'Argent
FC Barcelona	Barcelona
Universitary SC	Barcelona
FC Espanya de Barcelona	Barcelona
CE Sabadell FC	Sabedell

== Tournament ==
=== Results ===
Quarter-finals
1 March - Barcelona
(Catalonia) FC Espanya	1
(Catalonia) Universitary SC	0
15 March - Barcelona
(Catalonia) FC Barcelona	5
(Catalonia) CE Sabadell FC	0
(Bordeaux) La Comète et Simiot
15 March - Bordeaux
(Toulouse) Union Sportive Albigeoise
(Toulouse) Stade toulousain	Forfeit

Semi-finals
29 March - Barcelona
(Catalonia) FC Espanya	5
(Catalonia) FC Barcelona	2
19 April - Toulouse
(Bordeaux) La Comète et Simiot	5
(Toulouse) Union Sportive Albigeoise	0

Final
24 May – Barcelona
(Catalonia) FC Espanya	3
(Bordeaux) La Comète et Simiot	1

=== Quarter-finals ===
1 March 1914
15:30

FC Espanya	1 - 0	Universitary SC
Passani

Carrer Casanova, Barcelona
Referee: Manuel Amechazurra (FC Barcelona)
15 March 1914

FC Barcelona	5 - 0	CS Sabadell
Wallace II; Bau; Alcántara

Camp del carrer Indústria, Barcelona
Referee: Jack Greenwell (FC Barcelona)
15 March 1914

Union Sportive Albigeoise	Awarded to Albigeoise	Stade toulousain

=== Semi-final ===
29 March 1914
16:00

FC Barcelona	2 - 5	FC Espanya
Peris; Bau	Report1; Report2	Baró; Bellavista

Camp del carrer Indústria, Barcelona
Attendance: 16,000
Referee: Nandy

After the final, there were serious incidents and field invasion. Molins attacked Salvó I, giving him a punch that left him unconscious.

19 April 1914

La Comète et Simiot	5 - 0	Union Sportive Albigeoise

Ponts-Jumeaux, Toulouse
Referee: Nandy

=== Final ===
24 May 1914
16:30

FC Espanya	3 - 1	Cométe et Simot
Salvó II; Bellavista		Sandwal

Carrer Casanova, Barcelona
Referee: Durand (Stade toulousain)

== Statistics ==
=== Top Scorers ===
Rank	Player	Team	Goals
1	Jaime Bellavista	FC Espanya	5
2	Gabriel Bau	FC Barcelona	3
3	Pantaleón Salvó II	FC Espanya	2
3	Percival Wallace II	FC Barcelona	2

Source: RSSSF

== See also ==
- 1895 World Championship
- 1900 Coupe Van der Straeten Ponthoz
- 1909 Sir Thomas Lipton Trophy
