= Francisco Vinyals =

Spanish footballer

Personal information
- Full name: Francisco Vinyals Bou
- Birth name: Francesc Vinyals i Bou
- Date of birth: 10 December 1897
- Place of birth: Barcelona, Spain
- Date of death: 1 April 1951 (aged 53)
- Position: Winger

Senior career*
Years	Team	Apps	(Gls)
1914–1926	FC Barcelona	103	(12)

International career
1917–1921	Catalonia	4	(0)
- * Club domestic league appearances and goals

Francisco Vinyals Bou (10 December 1897 – April 1951) was a Spanish footballer who played as a winger with FC Barcelona for his entire career which spanned 12 years between 1914 and 1926. He was one of the first footballers to play for Barcelona for his entire career, and thus be part of the so-called one-club men group.

== Club career ==
Born and raised in Barcelona, Vinyals began his career at his hometown club FC Barcelona, making his debut on 25 October 1914 against UE Sant Andreu in a Catalan championship match.

Vinyals played for Barça for more than a decade, being a regular in the starting line-ups from the 1914–15 season until the 1924–25 season. He played a total of 103 official matches (15 in the Copa del Rey and 88 in the Catalan championship), netting 12 goals. In total, he played 349 unofficial matches. Vinyals was a member of the first golden generation of the club, which was coached by Jack Greenwell, and included Paulino Alcántara, Sagibarba, Félix Sesúmaga, Ricardo Zamora and Josep Samitier. Together with them, he helped Barça win 7 Catalan championships, along with five Copa del Rey finals in 1919, 1920, 1922, 1925 and 1926, winning the latter four, but oddly, the final in which Vinyals managed to score a goal was the one which they lost in 1919, ending in a 2–5 loss to Arenas de Getxo, courtesy of a hat-trick from Félix Sesúmaga.

Vinyals was honored with a tribute match on 14 April 1918, which was held at the Camp de la Indústria when he was still an active player. Just over a year before, on 4 February 1917, fellow one-club Barça men Ramón Torralba had become the first player in the history of Barcelona to be granted a tributed match. He played his last match for Barça on 4 April 1926 against Real Zaragoza in the Copa del Rey, and so, on 19 June 1927, he was the subject of another tribute match together with Ramon Bruguera, this time in Les Corts. His brother Josep Vinyals also played for Barça but only in unofficial matches. Along with his brother, he was an outstanding long-distance runner.

== Honours ==
=== Club ===
FC Barcelona

Catalan championship:

- Champions (7): 1915–16, 1918–19, 1919–20, 1920–21, 1921–22, 1923–24, 1924–25

Copa del Rey:

- Champions (4): 1920, 1922, 1925 and 1926
- Runner-up (1): 1919
