= Gabriel Bau =

Spanish footballer

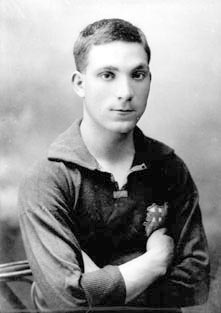

Personal information
- Full name: Gabriel Bau Fortanete
- Date of birth: 15 August 1892
- Place of birth: Gràcia, Barcelona, Spain
- Date of death: 7 October 1944 (aged 52)
- Place of death: Barcelona, Catalonia
- Position: Forward

Senior career*
Years	Team	Apps	(Gls)
1909–1910	FC Central		
1910	FC Numancia		
1910	RCD Espanyol		
1910–1914	FC Espanya		
1914–1916	FC Barcelona		
1916–1917	CF Badalona		
1917–1918	FC Barcelona		
1918–1924	CF Badalona		
1924	UE Sant Andreu		

International career
1912–1921	Catalonia	+12	(0)

Managerial career
- 1925–1926: UE Sant Andreu
- 1929–1930: UE Sant Andreu
- 1932–1933: UE Sant Andreu
- * Club domestic league appearances and goals

Gabriel Bau Fortanete (15 August 1892 – 7 October 1944), was a Spanish footballer who played as a forward for FC Barcelona, FC Espanya, and a brief spell at RCD Espanyol.

== Club career ==
Born in Barcelona, he began his career at FC Central in 1909, but the club was dissolved in 1910 and its field was acquired by FC Numancia, and most of the Central players, including Bau, joined Numancia. However, after just a couple of months with Numancia, Bau was signed by RCD Espanyol in that same year, but once again he only lasted a couple of months, being then signed by FC Espanya. Bau quickly become a key element of the team, and even though the team's main source of power was its infamous backline made of Hermenegild Casellas and Eduardo Reguera, he also played a very important role in the team's rise to national dominance, competing head-to-head against the likes of Barcelona and Espanyol, helping FC Espanya win its first-ever piece of silverware, the 1912–13 Catalan championship, which was followed by another championship in 1913–14, so he was signed by FC Barcelona in early 1914, with whom he won the 1915–16 Catalan championship, as the team's top scorer even ahead of the great Paulino Alcántara.

In the quarter-finals of the 1914 Pyrenees Cup, Bau netted a brace in a 5–0 victory over CS Sabadell, thus reaching the semi-finals where Barça faced his former club FC Espanya, and Bau scored again, but his new side still lost 2–5, courtesy of a poker from Jaime Bellavista, thus ousting him for the top scorer of the tournament.

In 1916 he joined the ranks of CF Badalona where he would play one season as captain, before returning to Barcelona again the following year to play the 1917–1918 season. He spent his last years at Badalona where he played as a wildcard from left inside, midfield to defense until 1924, when he was signed by Sant Andreu where he ended his career in that same year.

== Managerial career ==
As a coach, he managed Sant Andreu on three occasions: 1925–26, 1929–30 and 1932–33.

== International career ==
Like many other FC Espanya players of that time, Bau was eligible to play for the Catalonia national team, and in 1912, the Catalan Federation called him to be part of the team's first-ever game recognized by FIFA on 20 February 1912, which ended in a 0–7 loss to France.

He died in Barcelona and was buried in the Cemetery of the Corts, near his club's stadium.

== Honours ==
=== Club ===
FC Espanya

- Catalan championship:
  - Champions (2): 1912–13 and 1913–14

FC Barcelona

- Catalan championship:
  - Champions (2): 1915–16 and 1917–18
