= Hermenegild Casellas =

Spanish footballer

Personal information
- Full name: Hermenegild Casellas Bosch
- Date of birth: 1890
- Place of birth: Catalonia, Spain
- Date of death: 1969 (aged 78–79)
- Place of death: El Pla de Santa Maria, Catalonia, Spain
- Positions: Midfielder; defender

Youth career
- 1903–1906: Joventut FC

Senior career*
Years	Team	Apps	(Gls)
1906–1910	Català FC		
1910–1918	FC Espanya		

International career
1910-1916	Catalonia	8	(1)
Medal record
Catalonia
Prince of Asturias Cup
Gold medal – first place	1916 Prince of Asturias Cup	Team
- * Club domestic league appearances and goals

Hermenegild Casellas Bosch (1890 – 1969) was a Spanish footballer who played as a midfielder and later as defender. Together with Alfredo Massana, he was considered the best Catalan midfielder at the time. Although history seems to have blurred the legend of Casellas, he was one of the most important footballers in the amateur beginnings of FC Espanya, being a pivotal piece in turning FC Espanya into an important team in Catalonia.

== Club career ==
Born in Catalonia, He began his career at the youth team of Joventut FC, from where he joined Català FC in the mid-1900s, playing for them until 1911, when he signed for FC Espanya, with whom he played for nearly a decade. First, as a midfielder, and later as a defender, he was one of the main architects of the team's football power in Catalonia, competing head-to-head against the likes of Barcelona and Espanyol, being crucial in helping them to win three Catalan championships in 1912–13, 1913–14 and 1916–17, and he also was pivotal in helping Espanya reach the 1914 Copa del Rey Final, which still stands as the only Copa del Rey Final of the club's history, but they lost 1–2 to Athletic Bilbao, courtesy of a brace from Severino Zuazo. He retired in 1918, and later became the club's manager.

== International career ==
He played several matches for the Catalonia national team, against the likes of Basque Country, France and Madrid, the latter of which being the decisive game of the 1916 Prince of Asturias Cup, which ended in a 2–2 draw that proved enough for Catalonia to lift their first-ever piece of silverware. Casellas scored his only goal for the Catalans in a 2–2 draw with Gipuzkoa on 1 November 1915.

== Later life ==
Around 1916 he moved to El Pla de Santa Maria, where he introduced football to the town, and where he lived until his death in 1969, at the age of 79.

== Honours ==
=== Club ===
FC Espanya

- Catalan championship:
  - Champions (3): 1912–13, 1913–14 and 1916–17
- Copa del Rey:
  - Runner-up (1): 1914

=== International ===
Catalonia

- Prince of Asturias Cup:
  - Champions (1): 1916
