= Manuel Lemmel =

Spanish footballer (1894–?)

Personal information
- Full name: Manuel Lemmel Malo de Molina
- Date of birth: 26 March 1894
- Place of birth: Barcelona, Spain
- Position: Midfielder

Senior career*
Years	Team	Apps	(Gls)
1912–1913	FC Barcelona		
1913	Universitari SC		
1913–1916	Espanyol		

Managerial career
- 1924–1925: Stadium Zaragoza
- 1928–1929: Cultural y Deportiva Leonesa
- * Club domestic league appearances and goals

Manuel Lemmel Malo de Molina (26 March 1894 – unknown) was a Spanish footballer who played as a midfielder for FC Barcelona and Espanyol in the 1910s. He also briefly worked as a referee in the early 1920s, and later as a manager in the late 1920s.

== Sporting career ==
=== Football career ===
Born on 26 March 1894 in Barcelona, Lemmel began his career at his hometown club Barcelona in 1912, aged 18, for he played a total of four matches, albeit all unofficial. He spent the final part of the 1912–13 season at Universitari SC, and then joined the ranks of RCD Espanyol, where he stayed for three seasons, helping his side win the Catalan championship in the 1914–15 season.

=== Athletic career ===
Lemmel was an outstanding high jumper, running 11.8 seconds in the 100 meters and jumping 1.55 in the high jump, both in 1912.

=== Refereeing career ===
Once he retired from active sports, Lemmel became a football referee, directing a few Catalan Championship matches in the early 1920s.

=== Managerial career ===
Lemmel was Paco Bru's assistant in the Spain national team at the 1920 Olympic Games in Antwerp. He also coached Stadium Zaragoza in 1924–25 and Cultural y Deportiva Leonesa in 1928–29.

== Personal life ==
His brother, Pablo, also played for Espanyol.

It is not known for certain when he died. (Note: The last information about him in newspaper archives dates from late 1934.) He was buried in the Montjuïc Cemetery.

== Honours ==
Espanyol

- Catalan championship: 1914–15
