= Sotero Aranguren =

Argentine footballer

Sotero
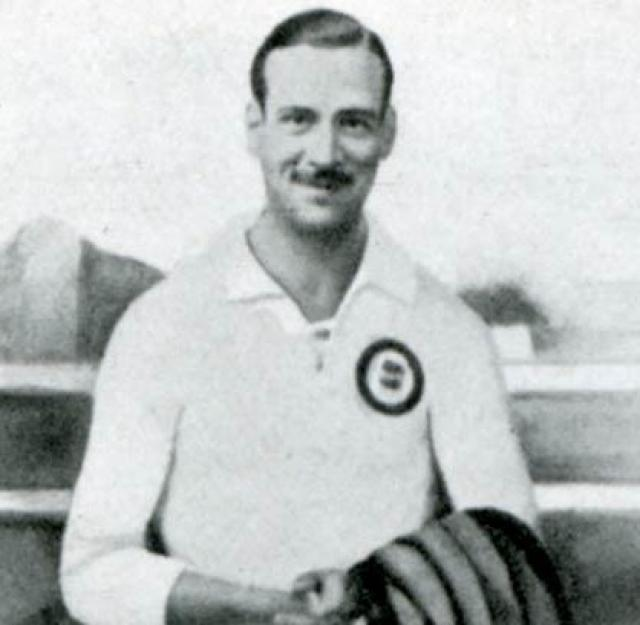
- Sotero Aranguren in 1910s

Personal information
- Full name: Sotero Aranguren Labairu
- Date of birth: May 7, 1894
- Place of birth: Buenos Aires, Argentina
- Date of death: February 26, 1922
- Place of death: San Sebastián, Spain
- Position: Midfielder

Sotero Aranguren Labairu (7 May 1894 – 26 February 1922), was an Argentine footballer born in Buenos Aires who spent his youth in Basque Country. He was a midfielder and played most of his career for Real Madrid CF. He and his brother Eulogio were team-mates at Real Madrid.

== Biography ==
He played for Real Madrid for seven years, between 1911 and 1918, scoring 4 goals in 60 matches.

He is considered "the first white symbol" by the Real Madrid official website.

His premature death at the age of 28 led the club to build a statue representing Sotero and one of his team-mates, Machimbarrena (who also died young) at the entrance of the first team's locker room. The statue, added in 1925, now stands at the Santiago Bernabéu Stadium, and is seen as a totem of inspiration for Real Madrid's coming generations of footballers.

Sotero and Eulogio Aranguren were the first Argentine men's footballers who played for Real Madrid.

== Honours ==
Real Madrid

- Copa del Rey: 1917
- Campeonato Regional Centro: 1912–13, 1915–16, 1916–17
