= 1914 Copa del Rey =

14th Copa del Rey

Tournament details
- Country: Spain
- Teams: 4

Final positions
- Champions: Athletic Bilbao (5th title)
- Runners-up: España FC

Tournament statistics
- Matches played: 5
- Goals scored: 23 (4.6 per match)

The Copa del Rey 1914 was the 14th staging of the Copa del Rey, the Spanish football cup competition.

The Royal Spanish Football Federation took complete control of the cup tournament and decided that the clubs of the existing regional championship would qualify for the national cup championship; no free entry would be permitted anymore. Apart from some exception, the elimination rounds were played in two matches (home and away) from this season onwards. The competition started on 29 March 1914, and concluded on 10 May 1914, with the Final, held at the Estadio de Costorbe in Irun, in which Athletic Bilbao lifted the trophy for the 5th time ever with a 2–1 victory over España de Barcelona with Severino Zuazo netting both goals for Bilbao.

== Teams ==
- North Region: Athletic Bilbao
- Center Region: Sociedad Gimnástica
- Galicia Region: Real Vigo SC
- Catalonia Region: FC Espanya de Barcelona

== Semifinals ==
=== First leg ===
29 March 1914

Athletic Bilbao	11–0	Real Vigo SC
José María Belauste I 20'; Severino Zuazo 35'; Alfonso González "Apón" 38', 40', 54'; Ramón Belauste II 43'; Pichichi 60', 70', 81', 89'; Luis Iceta 90'

San Mamés Stadium, Bilbao
Referee: (England) Mr. Rowland

26 April 1914

España FC	1–0	Sociedad Gimnástica
Hermenegild Casellas	Report

Camp del Carrer Entença, Barcelona
Referee: (Spain) Marcial Varela

=== Second leg ===
5 April 1914

Real Vigo SC	3–3	Athletic Bilbao
Alfredo Ruiz 30'; Antonio de Haz 40', 60'	Report	Severino Zuazo 12', 50'; Ramón Belauste II 15'

Campo de Coia, Vigo
Referee: Raúl López

Athletic Bilbao won 14–3 on aggregate

3 May 1914

España FC	1–1	Sociedad Gimnástica
Eulogio Uribarri	Report	Antonio Baró

O'Donnell, Madrid
Referee: (Spain) Eulogio Aranguren

España FC won 2–1 on aggregate

== Final ==
10 May 1914
16:30

Athletic Bilbao	2–1	España FC
Severino Zuazo 20', 29'	Report	Jaime Villena 88'

Costorbe, Irun
Referee: (England) Mr. Rowland

Copa del Rey 1914 winners
Athletic Bilbao
5th title
