= Vicente Martínez (footballer) =

Spanish footballer

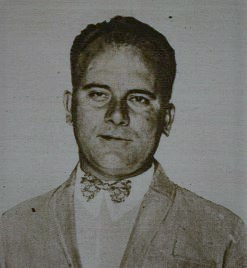
- Martínez in 1924

Personal information
- Full name: Vicente Martínez Duart
- Date of birth: 1895
- Place of birth: Catalonia, Spain
- Date of death: 20 September 1963 (aged 67–68)
- Place of death: Catalonia, Spain
- Position: Forward

Youth career
- 1905–1907: Madrid de Barcelona
- 1907–1911: CE Europa

Senior career*
Years	Team	Apps	(Gls)
1911–1915	CE Europa		
1915–1923	FC Barcelona	285	(203)

International career
1915-1925	Catalonia	7	(4)
- * Club domestic league appearances and goals

Vicente Martínez Duart (1895 - 20 September 1963) was a Spanish footballer who played as a forward. He was one of the great forwards of Barcelona's early history, netting 203 goals in 285 games between 1915 and 1923, although this tally includes goals scored in friendlies and unofficial games.

== Club career ==
He began his career at the youth ranks of Madrid de Barcelona, who after merging with Provençal in 1907 created the CE Europa. Martínez's qualities quickly stood out from the rest and soon he was promoted to the first team in 1911, at the age of only 16. One of the first matches he played was a friendly against Numancia on 23 July 1911, and some sources state that he is the youngest player in history to wear Europa's shirt, but it's not known for sure due to the lack of information. At Europa, he formed a partnership with the Pelaó brothers (Estebán and Bonaventura) and continued to score prolifically for the club, unfortunately, and due to the little statistical rigor that the newspapers had at that time, we know nothing about his goalscoring records with Europe. His goalscoring records eventually drew the attention of Barcelona, who signed him in 1915 in what is considered one of the first major transfers in Europe, because at the time, club changes, especially of the main star players, were not too common. His move to Barcelona was not too well received by his Europa teammates, who considered his transfer a betrayal.

At Barcelona, he did not lose his goal-scoring instinct, becoming one of the great forwards of the club by netting 203 goals in 285 games between 1915 and 1923, although this tally includes goals scored in friendlies and unofficial games. With Barcelona he won 5 Catalan championships in 1915–16, 1918–19, 1919–20, 1920–21 and in 1921–22, along with two Copa del Rey titles in 1920 and 1922, with Martínez scoring the opening goal in the former final.

On 13 October 1918, a tribute match was played in his honour at the Camp de la Indústria, between Barcelona and CE Europa, which ended in a 2–1 victory for Barcelona. The first player in Barcelona's history to have been granted a tribute match was Ramón Torralba a year earlier, on 4 February 1917, and coincidentally, both retired from football with Barcelona after a second tribute match at the Camp de Les Corts, with Martínez's being the first-ever to be held there on 17 June 1923, retiring after 8 seasons at Barcelona.

== International career ==
He was summoned by the Catalonia national team for 9 games, where he would score 4 goals, including the winner against a Paris XI on 1 November 1925, two years after he had already retired from football.

== Honours ==
=== Club ===
Barcelona

Catalan football championship:

- Champions (5): 1915–16, 1918–19, 1919–20, 1920–21, 1921–22

Copa del Rey:

- Champions (2): 1920 and 1922
