= Severino Zuazo =

Spanish footballer

Personal information
- Full name: Severino Zuazo Ugalde
- Date of birth: 19 May 1889
- Place of birth: Bilbao, Spain
- Date of death: 20 July 1980 (aged 91)
- Position: Forward

Senior career*
Years	Team	Apps	(Gls)
1908–1914	Athletic Club		
- * Club domestic league appearances and goals

Severino Zuazo Ugalde (19 May 1889 - 20 July 1980) was a Spanish footballer who played as a forward for Athletic Club. He spent his whole career at Athletic, which makes him one of the first footballers to play for Athletic for his entire career, and thus to be part of the so-called one-club men group.

He was the brother of the architect Secundino Zuazo.

== Biography ==
Born in Bilbao, he began playing football in 1908 at his hometown Athletic Club. Zuazo played a pivotal role in helping the club win a North Regional Championship in 1914 and three Copa del Reys in 1910, 1911 and 1914. In the latter edition, he was its top scorer with a total of 5 goals, including both in a 2–1 win over España FC in the final. He also starred in the first-ever match played at the San Mamés stadium on 21 August 1913, in a friendly against Racing de Irun, making the kick-off that started the game and later assisting Pichichi for the first-ever goal scored at the stadium. On 18 January 1914, Zuazo become the second player in history to score a hat-trick in San Mamés in a Regional Championship match against Sporting de Irún, achieving the feat only minutes after the debutant Félix Zubizarreta scored five goals in that game.

== Honours ==
=== Club ===
Athletic Bilbao

North Regional Championship:

- Champions (1): 1914

Copa del Rey:

- Champions (3): 1910, 1911 and 1914
