= FC Espanya de Barcelona =

FC Espanya
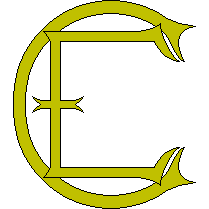
- Full name: FC España de Barcelona
- Founded: 1905
- Dissolved: 1931
- Ground: Camp del Carrer Entença
- League: Championat de Catalunya
Home colours	Away colours	Third colours

FC España de Barcelona, was a Spanish Catalan football club based in Barcelona. They enjoyed a golden age during the 1910s and were Catalan champions three times during the decade. They were also Copa del Rey runners-up in 1914. By 1923 the club had changed its name to Gràcia FC and in 1932 it merged with CE Europa.

Founded by three students, Graells, Rossendo and Just, in September 1905, their first game was against an FC Barcelona second team. They were one of several football clubs to emerge with a reference to Spain in their title. Others in Barcelona included Hispania AC and Sociedad Española de Football, both formed in 1900. This latter club later became RCD Espanyol. Elsewhere Real Madrid was formed after a split with Club Español de Madrid and CD Español de Valladolid later merged into Real Valladolid. Other similar named clubs also emerged in Cádiz and Valencia.

== Golden Age ==
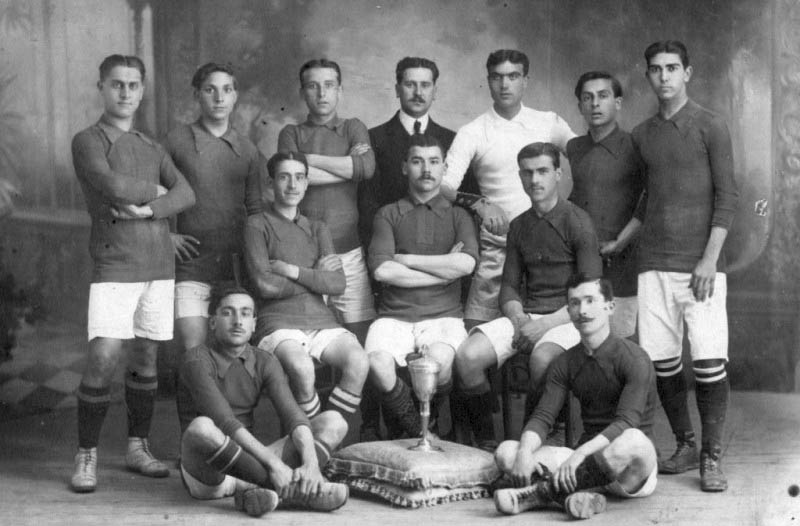
The 1913 team posing with the Champions of Catalunya Cup trophy

FC Espanya made their debut in the Campionat de Catalunya during the 1907–08 season and during the 1910s they challenged the monopoly previously enjoyed by Barcelona and RCD Espanyol. During the 1912–13 season there was a split in the Royal Spanish Football Federation and rival competitions were organised in both the Campionat de Catalunya and the Copa del Rey. FC Espanya won one version of the Campionat and then qualified for the Copa FEF. After beating Real Vigo Sporting in a preliminary round they then lost 1–0 to the eventual winners Racing de Irún in the semi-final. 1914 was the most successful year in the club's history. They won a reunited Campionat de Catalunya and then reached the 1914 Copa del Rey final where they lost 2–1 to Athletic Bilbao. They also won the Coupe de Pyrenées, a competition featuring the top teams from Languedoc, Le Midi, Aquitaine, Catalonia, and the Basque Country. In 1917 FC Espanya won a third Campionat de Catalunya and received a bye to the 1917 Copa del Rey semi-finals where it took the eventual winners Madrid FC four games to beat them.

== Decline in the 1920s ==
In subsequent years the club went into decline and in 1920 they finished bottom of Category A of the Campionat de Catalunya and only survived relegation after winning a play-off against L’Avenç. However the following year they finished bottom again and this time they lost the play-off to the same club. In 1922 they were Category B champions but subsequently lost a play-off to RCD Espanyol.

== Gràcia FC ==
In 1923 FC Espanya changed their name to Gràcia FC and under this name they were promoted to Category A in 1924. They survived in Category A until 1928 when they found themselves relegated once again. In 1931 Gràcia FC merged with CE Europa and briefly became known as Catalunya FC. However the merger of the two clubs was not a success and during the 1931-32 season Catalunya FC, with three games to go, were unable to complete their fixture list due to financial reasons. As a result, the fifteen games they had played in the Segunda División were annulled and the team were relegated to the Tercera División. The club then reverted to the name CE Europa in 1932.

== Honours ==
- Copa del Rey
  - Runners-up (1): 1914
- Catalan Champions
  - Winners (3): 1912–13, 1913–14, 1916–17
  - Runners-up (4): 1909–10, 1911–12, 1915–16, 1917–18
- Pyrenees Cup
  - Winners (1): 1914
- Championat de Catalunya B
  - Winners (1): 1921–22

- 1 seasons in Segunda División
