= Enrique Montells =

Spanish footballer

Personal information
- Full name: Enric Montells i Gatell
- Date of birth: 14 April 1883
- Place of birth: Barcelona, Spain
- Date of death: 30 July 1904 (aged 21)
- Place of death: Barcelona, Spain
- Position: Forward

Senior career*
Years	Team	Apps	(Gls)
1900–1904	RCD Espanyol		

International career
1903	Barcelona	1	(0)
- * Club domestic league appearances and goals

Enrique Montells Gatell (14 April 1883 – 30 July 1904) was a Spanish footballer who played as a forward for RCD Espanyol between 1901 and 1904, winning two Catalan Championships. In addition to football, he also performed in other modalities such as shooting, cycling, and sailing.

== Biography ==
Enrique Montells was born on 14 April 1883 in Barcelona, as the son of Enrique Montells and Dolores Gatell. where he began to play football, being one of the founders of Foot-Ball Club Español, where he played as a winger. He was the club's president when it merged with the recently established Sociedad Española de Foot-Ball, now known as RCD Espanyol, thus becoming one of the first associates in the history of the club. On 3 January 1901, he was elected as a member of Espanyol's first board of directors alongside Telesforo Álvarez and Marcel Martino Arroyo. He stood out for his great corpulence, thus developing into a forward.

Together with Ángel Ponz, Luciano Lizárraga, Joaquim Carril, and club founders Octavi Aballí and Ángel Rodríguez, he represented Espanyol in the very first Spanish club to win an official title, the 1900–01 Copa Macaya, which was the first football competition played on the Iberian Peninsula. He played in the opening three matches between January and February 1901, including two wins over Franco-Española and Tarragona to help his side to a third-place finish behind FC Barcelona and the winners Hispania AC.

Montells also played in the following two editions of the competition, scoring once in the second edition in 1901–02 and winning the third in 1902–03, the club's first-ever piece of silverware. In total, he played 16 matches in the Copa Macaya. Together with Ponz, Carril, Benigno Belauste, Emilio Sampere, and Gustavo Green, he was part of the team that won the first edition of the Campionat de Catalunya in 1903–04.

On 24 September 1903, Montells participated in a test match between a white and a red team made up of players who were playing in Barcelona, which was meant to decide who would integrate the first team of the Catalonia national team the following year.

== Death ==
Montells died in Barcelona on 30 July 1904, at the age of 21, when he was still an active player and was occupying the position of accountant in the club. According to the newspapers of the time "Enrique, strong as an athlete and in the fullest vigor of a flowery youth, had his life robbed from him in just a few days by a treacherous illness.

== Honours ==
RCD Espanyol

- Copa Macaya:
  - Champions: 1902–03
- Copa Barcelona:
  - Runner-up: 1902–03
- Catalan Championships:
  - Champions: 1903–04
