= Antonio Solé =

Spanish footballer

Personal information
- Birth name: Antoni Solé
- Place of birth: Catalonia, Spain
- Position(s): Defender and Midfielder

Senior career*
Years	Team	Apps	(Gls)
1900–1901	Sociedad Española		
1901–1904	RCD Espanyol B		
1904–1910	RCD Espanyol		
- *Club domestic league appearances and goals

Antonio Solé, sometimes misspelled as Antoni Soler, (Note: At the turn of the century, Catalan football had several players with the surname Solé or Soler, such as Joan Soler of Barça, Josep Maria Soler of Espanyol; S. Soler of Hispania AC and V. Soler of SD Santanach; and then R. Soler of Universitary SC, Solé of Irish FC, and (Antoni) Solé of Espanyol, and this naturally resulted in a lot of headaches and misspellings by the football historian who researched these players. Furthermore, there was also a certain Antonio Soler, the vice secretary of "Velo Club", a cycling club headquartered at the Nuevo Velódromo de Barcelona, which was the football pitch of Hispania.) was a Spanish footballer who played as a defender and midfielder for RCD Espanyol in the 1910s, winning the Copa Macaya in 1903.

== Biography ==
Very little is known about his life; Solé was one of the first players of Sociedad Española, now known as RCD Espanyol, being a member of the club's very first team. On 25 November 1900, Solé played as a defender for Sociedad Española in a "morning session" against Hispania AC, which ended in a 4–4 draw. Together with Ángel Ponz, Luciano Lizárraga, Joaquim Carril, and club founders Octavi Aballí and Rodríguez, he represented Espanyol in the 1900–01 Copa Macaya, which was the first football competition played on the Iberian Peninsula. He played in only one match, which ended in a 2–0 win over Tarragona on 10 February 1901; Espanyol finished in third-place behind FC Barcelona and the winners Hispania AC.

Between 1900 and 1903, this was the only official match that Solé played for Espanyol's first team, spending most of his career with the club's reserve/second team, but despite his lack of playing time, he remained loyal to Espanyol. He was a member of the Espanyol second team that participated in the 1902 Medalla del Ayuntamiento, a tournament organized by the Spanish Gymnastics Federation and which was contested by the second teams of the clubs that played in the Copa Macaya and by the first teams of newly created clubs. On 2 March, he started as a forward alongside Josep Maria Soler, and they both scored once in a 5–1 win over Catalònia. Two weeks later, on 16 March, he scored a goal to help his side to a 5–2 win over Irish FC. However, they finished the tournament in fourth place.

In 1903, Solé won the Copa Macaya; however, he had little to no contribution to this triumph. In the 1904–05 season, Solé, after nearly five years with the club, finally achieved his breakthrough to the first team, playing a total of four matches in the Catalan championship, forming a strong defensive partnership with Joaquim Carril. Following a hiatus, he returned to Espanyol to play two more seasons from 1908 to 1910.

== Honours ==
RCD Espanyol

- Copa Macaya:
  - Champions: 1902–03
