= Guillermo Galiardo =

Spanish footballer (1876–1950)

Personal information
- Full name: Guillermo Galiardo Armijo
- Date of birth: 1876
- Place of birth: Granada, Andalusia, Spain
- Date of death: 16 August 1950 (aged 73–74)
- Place of death: Málaga, Spain
- Position: Midfielder

Senior career*
Years	Team	Apps	(Gls)
1902–1905	RCD Espanyol		
1905–1906	X Sporting Club		
1909–1911	RCD Espanyol		

International career
1903	Barcelona	1	(0)
- * Club domestic league appearances and goals

Guillermo Galiardo Armijo (1876 – 16 August 1950) was a Spanish footballer who played as a midfielder for RCD Espanyol. He also played a few unofficial matches for FC Barcelona, and later worked as a referee.

== Playing career ==
Guillermo Galiardo was born in 1876 in Granada, but it was in Barcelona where he began to play football, being one of the pioneers of RCD Espanyol, since he was always present in the entity's squads from its foundation until 1911. He was one of the main strongholds of Espanyol during its first decade of existence, being thus named into the club's best starting eleven of the 1900s. He was a player respected by his teammates, a basic part of the team and, according to the testimony of Julià Clapera, he was a midfielder who charged with remarkable toughness, and who amused himself by practicing aiming with a ball kicked against the steam train that was circulating along the d'Aribau street. His brother Arturo also played in the team, but with much less prominence.

Together with his brother, Ángel Ponz, Joaquim Carril, Galiardo was a member of the Espanyol team that participated in the very first national tournament played in Spain, the 1902 Copa de la Coronación, and together with Ponz, Carril, Emilio Sampere, and Gustavo Green, he was part of the team that won the third edition of the Copa Macaya in 1902–03, the club's first-ever piece of silverware, playing 5 matches, and which then won the first edition of the Catalan championship in 1903–04, playing 8 matches.

Galiardo remained loyal to the club until 1905, when Español had to suspend its activities, and most of the remaining players, including him, Sampere, Ponz, and goalkeeper Pedro Gibert, joined X Sporting Club, and together with them, plus the Massana brothers (Santiago and Alfredo) and José Irízar, he helped X win the 1905–06 Catalan championship. He then decided to return to Barcelona, where he played two unofficial matches for FC Barcelona in April 1906, the first against Athletic Club (1–0 win) and the second against San Sebastián Recreation Club (3–1 loss). In 1909, following a three-year hiatus, Espanyol was finally and effectively relaunched, so Galiardo then played with Espanyol for two more years until 1911.

== International career ==
On 24 September 1903, Galiardo participated in a test match between a white and a red team made up of players who were playing in Barcelona, which was meant to decide who would integrate the first team of the Catalonia national team the following year.

On 13 April 1904, García made his debut for Catalan national team, only its second-ever match, which ended in a 2–3 loss to Sportsmen's Club, and in the following month, on 29 May, García played for Espanyol against Catalonia, scoring once in a 4–1 victory.

== Death ==
Galiardo died in Málaga on 16 August 1950, at the age of either 73 or 74.

== Honours ==
RCD Espanyol

- Copa Macaya: 1902–03
- Copa Barcelona runner-up: 1902–03
- Catalan Championships: 1903–04
