= Julià Clapera =

Spanish football executive

3rd President of RCD Espanyol
- In office 1909–1909
- Preceded by: José María Miró
- Succeeded by: Ángel Rodríguez

Personal details
- Born: 31 March 1887 Barcelona, Catalonia, Spain
- Died: 9 July 1976 (aged 89) Madrid, Spain
Association football career
- Full name: Julià Clapera Roca
- Birth name: Julià Clapera i Roca
- Position: Forward
Senior career*
Years	Team	Apps	(Gls)
1903–1905	RCD Espanyol		
- * Club domestic league appearances and goals

Julià Clapera Roca (31 March 1887 – 9 July 1976) was a Spanish footballer who was one of the most important figures in the amateur beginnings of RCD Espanyol as a club founder, manager, and president.

He was a founding member of both Sociedad Española de Football in 1900 and Club Español de jiujitsu in 1906. Together with Emilio Sampere, he played a pivotal role in the refoundation of Espanyol in 1909.

== Sporting career ==
=== Club Español ===
Julià Clapera was born on 31 March 1887 in Barcelona. On 28 October 1900, the 13-year-old Clapera, together with Ángel Rodríguez, Octavi Aballí, Joaquim Carril, and other young university students, created a football team which was officially established as the Sociedad Española de Fútbol, now known as RCD Espanyol, but due to his tender age, he only made his debut for the club until a few years later.

Clapera remained loyal to the club until 1906, when Español had to suspend its activities due to a lack of players since most of them were university students who enrolled to study at universities outside Catalonia in the 1905–06 academic year. Even though most of the remaining players joined X Sporting Club, such as Ángel Ponz, goalkeeper Pedro Gibert, and his cousin Emilio Sampere, the 19-year-old Clapera decided instead to found the Club Español de Jujitsu in 1906, in which he also integrated former Español members, and in which jujitsu, fencing, and boxing were also practiced.

In 1909, Clapera was the president of the Club Español de Jujitsu when he proposed to his cousin Emilio Sampere, a former Español player who had become the captain of Club X, the merger of both clubs to reactivate the Club Español that had been inactive for 3 years. They decided to call a meeting of members of both clubs to re-found the club. In 1909, Espanyol was thus effectively relaunched as the Club Deportivo Español, the name which still stands today, with Sampere being named the captain of the team, while the 22-year-old Clapera was elected president, thus becoming the club's third president after the founder Ángel Rodríguez and José María Miró. The new Club Español thus had jujitsu, fencing, and boxing sections, and even a recreational one dedicated to theatre, as well as 38 partners. The club's playing field was now located on Marina Street, where the Monumental Bullring stands today.

In 1974, Clapera himself explained the process of refounding Espanyol: "In 1909, some of the students who left three years earlier had returned and went to see me or Sampere with the idea of reviving Espanyol. So one day I decided to meet with Emilio, who at the time was the captain of Club X. At the beginning of 1909 I called a meeting of members of the Spanish Jiu-Jitsu Club in our social premises, located at 21 Aribau Street. Sampere and those from X also attended, as well as several players from the International Club. It was about the merger and there was a majority. We decided to call the entity Club Deportivo Español from now on. The football team was formed with the base of the X and the social mass with these and those of Jiu-Jitsu".

=== President of Espanyol ===
Clapera's presidency was short-lived as he only presided over the club for a few months before submitting his resignation to work for the club from the background. He was provisionally replaced by Ángel Rodríguez, the founder who had returned from Belgium. In the 1940s he was part of the board of the club, of which he was member number 1.

In 1947, following the dismissal of Francisco Román Cenarro for disagreeing with the Spanish Football Federation in designating La Coruña as the venue for the cup final, Clapera held the presidency for the second time, but it was short-lived again since it was only on an interim basis, holding the presidency until the appointment of José Salas Painello by the Franco Regime.

In 1950, Clapera unsuccessfully promoted that the celebration of the 50th anniversary of Espanyol should take place 50 years after the foundation of Sociedad Española de Fútbol in 1900. Subsequently, other voices who were part of the history of Espanyol entered this debate, with Ángel Rodríguez supporting Clapera while his cousin Sampere claimed that the club was founded in 1909 and that this should be the reference date to celebrate the anniversary. In the end, it was 1900 that was ultimately chosen.
