= José María Acha =

Spanish footballer and lawyer

Personal information
- Full name: José María Acha Larrea
- Date of birth: 4 September 1889
- Place of birth: Las Arenas, Getxo, Spain
- Date of death: 14 May 1929 (aged 39)
- Place of death: Castillejo de Mesleón, Spain
- Position: Goalkeeper

Senior career*
Years	Team	Apps	(Gls)
1901–1903	RCD Espanyol		
- * Club domestic league appearances and goals

José María Acha Larrea (4 September 1889 – 14 May 1929) was a Spanish footballer who played as a goalkeeper for RCD Espanyol between 1901 and 1903. He went on to become a lawyer and a sports leader, playing a crucial role in the creation of the Spanish league in the late 1920s.

== Playing career ==
José María Acha was born on 4 September 1889 in Getxo, but it was in Barcelona where he began to play football at Club Español in late 1901, at the age of 12. After a first season with many changes in goal, Acha arrived at the club to provide stability under the posts because despite his tender age and small stature, he was quick and agile. Together with Ángel Ponz, Enrique Montells, Joaquim Carril, and club founder Ángel Rodríguez, he helped Espanyol win its very first title, the 1902–03 Copa Macaya, playing in a total of five matches.

On 17 May 1903, Acha was a substitute to Samuel Morris and Vicente Reig in a friendly match at Muntaner between teams made up of the best players in Barcelona.

== Founding the Spanish league ==
At some point in the early 1920s, Acha became the vice president of Arenas Club de Getxo and the de facto leader of the club. With his personal wealth, he built the Ibaiondo field, which Arenas began using in September 1925, becoming the club's headquarters in its time of splendor.

As the president of the Vizcaya Football Federation in 1925, Acha was one of the architects of the implementation of professionalism in Spanish football, which occurred in 1926. Coincidentally, in 1927, the then Arenas Club president Luis Lazúrtegui was replaced by José Gandarias, who like Acha also had played a senior match at the age of 12, doing so for Real Madrid, albeit in a friendly.

After professional football was legalized in Spain, the country's main clubs came together to create a league, inspired by the English format, and Acha, the vice-president of Arenas, was the driving force behind the project, originally proposing a tournament made up of the six Cup winners, but even though the travels was quite affordable, this option would leave out the vast majority of Spanish football. Acha was then one of the basic pillars for the creation of the Torneo de Campeones, a competition to which he provided an organizational scheme similar to that used in England and that served as the forerunner for La Liga, founded in the following year, in 1929, with Arenas Club being one of its founders. For his important role in the founding of the first League championship, he was recognized with a bronze bust given by the rest of the clubs and that today rests in the club offices.

== Death ==
Acha died on 14 May 1929, at the age of 39, in a car accident in Castillejo de Mesleón while traveling from Bilbao to Madrid, where he was going to attend Spain's first match against England, which took place the following day.

== Honours ==
RCD Espanyol

- Copa Macaya:
  - Champions: 1902–03
- Copa Barcelona:
  - Runner-up: 1902–03
