= Soler (surname) =

Soler is a Spanish surname. Notable people with the surname include:

- Alay Soler (born 1979), Cuban baseball player for the New York Mets
- Alexandra Soler (born 1983), French artistic gymnast
- Álvaro Soler (born 1991), Spanish singer-songwriter
- Amalia Domingo Soler (1835–1909), Spanish writer
- Andrés Soler (1898–1969), Mexican actor
- Angelino Soler (born 1939), Spanish professional road bicycle racer
- Antonio Soler (disambiguation), several people
- Carlos Soler (born 1997), Spanish footballer
- Carlos Soler Márquez (born 1972), Spanish wheelchair fencer
- Domingo Soler (1901–1961), Mexican actor
- Fernando Soler (1896–1979), Mexican film actor and film director
- Francesc Fàbregas Soler (born 1987), Spanish footballer
- Francisco Gabilondo Soler (1907–1990), also known as Cri-Cri, Mexican composer and performer of children songs
- Gabriel Trujillo Soler (born 1979), Spanish professional tennis player
- Gérard Soler (born 1954), French-Moroccan footballer
- Giselle Soler (born 1997), Argentinian artistic roller skater
- Joan Soler (disambiguation), several people
- Jorge Soler (born 1992), Cuban baseball player
- Jorge Soler (gymnast), Argentine gymnast
- José Maria Soler (disambiguation), several people
- Juan Soler (disambiguation), several people
- Julián Soler (1907–1977), Mexican actor and film director
- Marc Soler (born 1993), Spanish cyclist
- Mariano Soler (1846–1908), Uruguayan cleric and theologian
- Mauricio Soler (born 1983), Colombian professional road bicycle racer
- Miguel Estanislao Soler (1783–1849), Argentine general
- Miquel Soler (born 1965), Spanish football player and coach
- Paco Soler (born 1970), Spanish former footballer and manager
- Pastora Soler, stage name of Pilar Sánchez Luque (born 1978), Spanish singer
- Placido Soler Bordas (1903–1964), Spanish chess player
- Rebecca Soler, American voice actress
- Sílvia Soler (born 1961), Spanish writer and journalist
- Sílvia Soler Espinosa (born 1987), Spanish retired tennis player
- Toti Soler, stage name of Jordi Soler i Galí (born 1949), Spanish guitarist, singer, and composer
- Vicente Martín y Soler (1754–1806), Spanish composer of opera and ballet
- Yolanda Soler (born 1972), Spanish judoka
- Wanda Soler Rosario (born 1971), Puerto Rican politician

== See also ==
- Erik Solér (born 1960), Norwegian former professional footballer
