= Benigno Belauste =

Spanish doctor and footballer

Personal information
- Full name: Benigno Belausteguigoitia Landaluce
- Date of birth: 16 January 1879
- Place of birth: Abando, Biscay, Spain
- Date of death: 1946 (age 66-67)
- Place of death: Abando, Biscay, Spain
- Position: Defender

Senior career*
Years	Team	Apps	(Gls)
1900	Bilbao Football Club		
1901–1904	RCD Espanyol		
- * Club domestic league appearances and goals

Benigno Belausteguigoitia Landaluce (16 January 1879 – Unknown) was a Spanish doctor and footballer who played as a defender for RCD Espanyol with he won the Catalan championship in 1904.

== Early life ==
Born to a wealthy family that was native to Llodio, Benigno was the third of the twelve children (eight men and four women) of the marriage formed by Federico and Dolores. His life was much more discreet than those of his brothers, some of whom were also football players, such as José María (1889), Santiago (1890) and Ramón (1891), who all played for Athletic Bilbao, while the others were writers, brilliant lawyers or illustrious scholars of the Basque language.

== Professional career ==
Belauste studied Medicine for almost twenty years at the Faculty of Barcelona and he took advantage of his stay in the Catalan capital to join the ranks of RCD Espanyol, playing as a defender for the club's second team. He specialized there in the throat, nose, and ears, and returned to Bilbao, where he worked as such at Gota de Leche, the Montepío de la Mujer que Trabajo and in his office on Calle de la Estación No. 8. He selflessly served in the Ledo office and for this reason, he was granted entry into the Civil Order of Charity.

When the Spanish Civil War broke out in 1936, Belauste remained in Bilbao. There was no news that he suffered persecution by the Franco authorities, unlike his brothers, several of whom went into exile in Mexico. He continued to work after the war and enjoyed a good name among the population and among his medical colleagues. Cultured man, member of Eusko Ikaskuntza, he dedicated his free time to the study of eating habits and Basque Popular Medicine. He wrote about both topics in the magazine Vida Vasca.

== Playing career ==
=== Bilbao FC ===
In the late 1890s, Belauste became a member of an informal group led by Carlos and Manuel Castellanos, the so-called Bilbao Football Club, the first entity to play football in Bilbao since the disappearance of Club Atleta. Although it was formed in 1896, it was not until 30 November 1900 that the Bilbao Football Club was officially established in a meeting held in the house of industrialist José Luis de Villabaso (1852–1917) in the Biscayan neighborhood of Algorta. However, before he even could play one match for the club, he moved to Barcelona to complete his studies, and there he joined the ranks of Espanyol.

=== RCD Espanyol ===
Together with Ángel Ponz, Gustavo Green, Emilio Sampere, and the three Joaquins (Escardó, Carril, and García), Belauste was part of the team that won the first edition of the Campionat de Catalunya in 1903–04.

== Personal life ==
Belauste married the Cuban Ysabel de Azcue Gorostizaga, and the couple had three children Manuel, Ramón, and Javier Belausteguigoitia Azcue.

Belauste died in Bilbao in 1946, at the age of either 66 or 67.

== Honours ==
RCD Espanyol

- Catalan championship:
  - Champions (1): 1903–04
