= Ricardo Cabot (footballer) =

Spanish athlete, journalist, executive (b. 1885, d. 1958)

- Born: Ricard Cabot i Montalt; 4 April 1885; Barcelona, Spain
- Died: 2 May 1958 (aged 73); Barcelona, Spain
- Citizenship: Spanish
- Occupations: Journalist; Lawyer; Field hockey player, footballer, sports executive
- Known for: President of the Catalan Football Federation and had a key role in the legalization of professionalism.

17th President of the Catalan Football Federation
- In office 1915–1915
- Preceded by: José Maria Tallada
- Succeeded by: Joaquim Peris

President of the Catalan Football Federation
- In office 1923–1926
- Preceded by: Josep Buchs
- Succeeded by: Josep Rosich
Association football career
- Full name: Ricardo Cabot Montalt
- Position: Forward
Senior career*
Years	Team	Apps	(Gls)
1901–1902	FC Catalònia		
1902	FC Barcelona		
1905–1906	Salud SC		
1906–1907	X Sporting Club		
- * Club domestic league appearances and goals

Ricardo Cabot Montalt (Note: In this Spanish name, the first or paternal surname is Cabot and the second or maternal family name is Montalt.) (4 April 1885 – 2 May 1958) was a Spanish footballer, sports journalist, manager, and sports director. A lawyer by profession, he was one of the pioneers in Spanish football legislation and played a key role in the legalization of professionalism. Cabot was also one of the pioneers of sports journalism in Spain, working with several sports magazines. He was the coach of the Spain national team in 1925, and he held the presidency of the Catalan Football Federation twice, in 1915 and again from 1923 to 1926. He was also a member of the Catalan Sports Confederation and the Spanish Olympic Committee, honorary president of the Spanish Football Federation and a member of merit of FC Barcelona.

In addition to football, he was an outstanding athlete who performed in other modalities such as field hockey, swimming, tennis, motor racing and foot races. He was the start of a family of field hockey players, which continued with his sons, Joaquín and Ricardo Cabot Boix, and his grandsons, Javier and Ricardo Cabot Duran.

== Playing career ==
During his youth, he studied law, and although he wanted to be a lawyer, he became interested in practising sports, some of which being still in their infancy in Spain. Inspired by the likes of FC Barcelona, Català FC and Hispania AC, he himself decided to have his own club, and so, in 1901, he managed to gather forty partners and founded Foot-ball Club Catalònia, a modest society of which he was president and soon began to demonstrate his organizational skills by writing the statutes of it alone. In 1902 he won the Medalla del Ayuntamiento, which was organized by the Spanish Gymnastics Federation, with the second team of FC Barcelona, a club where he also practiced field hockey together with Joan Gamper. A few years later, Catalònia merged with Salud Sport Club, and Cabot, who had already finished his law studies, played with the merged club for a brief spell; where he also played tennis; before joining X Sporting Club, a leading club in those days with prominent players such as Pedro Gibert, the Massana brothers (Alfredo and Santiago), José Irízar and José Berdié.

== Journalistic career ==
A restless and hyperactive man, for eight consecutive years he alternated the practice of law with literature, founding and directing the weekly Sports in 1906. He was also a sports reporter in El Mundo Deportivo and Los Deportes in 1908. In 1911 he was one of the founders of the "Stadium" magazine, which he directed from its inception until 1920. All of this led him to be elected president of the Union of Sports Journalists of Catalonia.

== President of the Catalan Football Federation ==
At the end of 1914, he became the president of the Catalan Football Federation, but not before making it a condition to have full powers to draw up and present new statutes and regulations in a short time. Thus, in 1915, the Catalan Federation enjoyed the best and most modern statutes in the whole country, and in his first appearance at the National Assembly of the recently established Royal Spanish Football Federation (RFEF), he took a draft with the new statutes and regulations to Madrid, and the Assembly accepted them. After this historic intervention, Cabot concluded his mandate in the Catalan Federation and resigned his re-election, spending the next five years (1915–1920) away from federative positions to concentrate on directing the Stadium magazine and practicing other sports that attracted him, such as swimming, tennis, motor racing and foot races to which he was faithfully devoted. However, his relationship with football remained alive and since he resided for long periods between Madrid and Barcelona, he had the opportunity to attend as a Catalan delegate at the RFEF Assemblies that were held in the state capital. In 1921, he was required by FC Barcelona to enter its board under the presidency of Joan Gamper in order to smooth out the legal aspects in order to obtain financial contributions for the construction of the Camp de Les Corts, the club's new field.

In 1923, he returned to the presidency of the Catalan Federation after being commissioned by the RFEF to reform his statutes and regulations and to adapt them to the current reality that was torn between amateurism and incipient professionalism, a statutory reform that would confront the so-called "brown amateurism", players who are legally amateurs, but professionals in practice. Cabot reformed the statutes and regulations with a great sense of vision of the future, and the new ones served as the basis for the rest of the territorial federations to modernize their regulations as well. In 1924, Cabot, in contact with FIFA, had a key role in the legalization and regulation of professionalism in Spanish football.

== Managerial career ==
At the same time, in July 1925, Cabot was appointed president of the Selection Committee of the Spain national team, which also included José María Mateos (who helped him with the regulation of professionalism) and Manuel de Castro. He oversaw two games in 1925, which ended with two prestigious victories for Spain: in Vienna against Austria and in Budapest against Hungary, in both cases by 0–1. Cabot's last meeting with the trio of selectors was an unofficial match against West Ham United, played in Madrid on 23 May 1926.

After a long and controversial process, the regulation of professionalism drawn up by him was finally approved at the RFEF assembly on 21 June 1926. At that same meeting, Cabot was unanimously elected Secretary General of the Federation (RFEF), a newly created position that forced him to abandon the presidency of the Catalan Federation, as well as his position on the Selection Committee, where he was replaced by Ezequiel Montero. That same year 1926 he became part of the Spanish Olympic Committee, although he had already participated in Olympic organizations previously.

As the Secretary General of the RFEF, he drafted the regulations and structured the competitive system that would lead to the creation of the Spanish national League. After the league was implemented and the new professional system for the players was consolidated, Cabot put all his efforts into codifying all the statutes and regulations of Spanish football, going on to define the two classes of players (professionals and amateurs) and to conclude with the bases for the dispute of matches and competitions.

== Head of the FEF in wartime ==
In 1936, with the outbreak of the Spanish Civil War, a Popular Front committee seized the Spanish Federation. President Leopoldo García Durán was replaced by José María Mengual, but Ricardo Cabot remained in the general secretariat, and soon moved the federative headquarters from besieged Madrid to Barcelona. Cabot remained as the unofficial main manager of the Federation, which in practice was inoperative, after decreeing the suspension of all competitions at the national level. And even more so when in 1937 a new Spanish Federation was created in the rebellious zone, based in San Sebastián, which in a few months gained legitimacy with the recognition by FIFA. When this new FEF gained confirmation as the only legal body for state football competitions, he understood that the FEF that he represented had its days numbered. So he gave an account of all the efforts made at the head of the General Secretariat that he held through a report addressed to Colonel Julián Troncoso, President of the FEF elected in San Sebastián. Given his status as an element of great value to carry out the upcoming work of reconstruction of post-war Spanish football, Cabot was integrated into the new FEF body in 1946, performing the same functions that he had been performing since 1926, the General Secretariat.

== Death ==
In 1956 Ricardo Cabot retired after three decades as general secretary of the Royal Spanish Football Federation, receiving a tribute at the Santiago Bernabéu Stadium. He died two years later, on 2 May 1958, at the age of 73.

== Honours ==
FC Barcelona II

- Medalla del Ayuntamiento
  - Champions: 1902
