= Octavi Aballí =

Spanish footballer

Personal information
- Full name: Octavio Aballí Aballí
- Birth name: Octavi Aballí i Aballí
- Date of birth: 1883
- Place of birth: Matanzas, Cuba
- Date of death: 20 March 1948 (aged 64–65)
- Place of death: Barcelona, Spain
- Position: Midfielder

Senior career*
Years	Team	Apps	(Gls)
1900–1905	RCD Espanyol		

International career
1902–1903	Barcelona City Team	2	(0)
- * Club domestic league appearances and goals

Octavi Aballí Aballí (1883 – 20 March 1948) was a Spanish footballer who played as a midfielder for RCD Espanyol. After his career as a footballer, he worked as a doctor.

== Playing career ==
=== RCD Espanyol ===
Born in Matanzas, Cuba, his family moved to Barcelona so that he could continue his studies. At the turn of the century, Aballí began to practice football, a sport relatively unknown at the time, at the Velódromo de la Bonanova with some friends and other young university students. In late 1900, the 17-year-old Aballí, together with two classmates from the university, Ángel Rodríguez and Luis Roca, created a football team that was officially established on 28 October 1900 as the Sociedad Española de Fútbol, which is now known as RCD Espanyol. The club's board of directors was subsequently elected and Aballí was named as its treasurer, a position he held for just one season (1900–01).

Together with Ángel Ponz, Luciano Lizárraga, Telesforo Álvarez, and Rodríguez, he represented Espanyol in the very first Spanish club to win an official title, the 1900–01 Copa Macaya, which was the first football competition played on the Iberian Peninsula. However, he only played in one match, on 27 January 1901 against FC Barcelona, which ended in a 1–4 loss.

Aballí kept playing for Espanyol until 1905, when he began appearing in formations of the reserve team. He stayed at the club until 1905, when Español had to suspend its activities due to a lack of players since most of them were university students who enrolled to study at universities outside Catalonia in the 1905–06 academic year. Most of the remaining players, including Joaquim Carril, Ángel Ponz, and goalkeeper Pedro Gibert, joined the ranks of X Sporting Club, but Aballí decided to retire instead.

=== International career ===
On 15 September 1902, Aballí went down in history as one of the 22 footballers who played in the very first match of the Barcelona City Team, a precursor to the Catalan national team, starting in a 3–3 draw with a team from Tiana at their field, on the occasion of the festivities of that town.

== Honours ==
RCD Espanyol

- Copa Macaya:
  - Champions: 1902–03
- Copa Barcelona:
  - Runner-up: 1902–03
- Catalan Championships:
  - Champions: 1903–04
