= Ponz =

Ponz is a Spanish surname. Notable people with the surname include:

- Antonio Ponz (1725–1792) was a Spanish painter
- Ángel Ponz (1883–1936), Spanish footballer
- Dani Ponz (born 1973), Spanish retired footballer
- Enrique Ponz (1894 – 9 August 1936), Spanish footballer
- Jaime Mosen Ponz (1671–1730), Spanish painter
- John de Ponz (c.1248–1307), English-born administrator, lawyer, and judge
