= Enrique Ponz =

Spanish footballer (1894 – 1936)

Personal information
- Full name: Enrique Ponz Junyent
- Birth name: Enric Ponz i Junyent
- Date of birth: 1894
- Place of birth: Reus, Spain
- Date of death: 9 August 1936 (aged 41–42)
- Place of death: Barcelona, Spain
- Position: Forward

Senior career*
| Years | Team | Apps | (Gls) |
| 1909–1915 | Espanyol | | |
- * Club domestic league appearances and goals

Enrique Ponz Junyent (1894 – 9 August 1936) was a Spanish footballer who played as a forward for RCD Espanyol. His older brother, Ángel, also played football for Espanyol.

== Biography ==
Born in 1894 Reus, Catalonia, Ponz began playing football with Espanyol in 1909, aged only 15. He was a member of the great Espanyol side of the 1910s that had the likes of Paco Bru, Emilio Sampere and the Armet brothers (Francisco and Kinké), winning the Catalan Championship in 1911–12, and then again in 1914–15.

Professionally, he was a telephone employee and union member of the Sindicat Lliure (Free Trade Union).

On 9 August 1936, Ponz was killed in the Republican rearguard at the beginning of the Spanish Civil War together with his brother Àngel.

== Honours ==
RCD Espanyol

- Catalan Championship:
  - Winners (2) 1911–12 and 1914–15
