= Galiardo =

Galiardo is a Spanish surname. Notable people with the surname include:

- Guillermo Galiardo (1876–1950), Spanish footballer
- Juan Luis Galiardo (1940–2012), Spanish television, theater, and film actor
