= Joaquim Carril =

Spanish footballer (1884–1948)

Personal information
- Full name: Joaquim Carril de Monasterio
- Date of birth: 23 January 1884
- Place of birth: Puigcerdà, Province of Girona, Spain
- Date of death: 2 April 1948 (aged 64)
- Place of death: Barcelona, Catalonia, Spain
- Position: Defender

Senior career*
Years	Team	Apps	(Gls)
1900–1905	RCD Espanyol		
1905–1908	X Sporting Club		
1908–1909	RCD Espanyol		

International career
1904–1906	Catalonia	1	(0)
- * Club domestic league appearances and goals

Joaquim Carril de Monasterio (23 January 1884 – 2 April 1948) was a Spanish footballer who played as a defender for RCD Espanyol in the early 20th century, serving the club as its first-ever captain.

== Club career ==
=== RCD Espanyol ===
Joaquim Carril was born on 23 January 1884 in Puigcerdà, Province of Girona, but it was in Barcelona where he began to play football. In 1900, the 16-year-old Carril, together with Ángel Rodríguez and other young university students, founded the Sociedad Española, now known as RCD Espanyol, and despite his tender age, he was named the club's first-ever captain. Together with Ángel Ponz and Luciano Lizárraga, and club founders Octavi Aballí and Rodríguez, he was a member of the Espanyol team that competed in the 1900–01 Copa Macaya, which was the first football competition played on the Iberian Peninsula. He also played in the following two editions of the competition, winning the third edition in 1902–03, the club's first-ever piece of silverware. In total, he played 12 matches in the Copa Macaya.

During this period, he also briefly worked as a referee. For instance, on 20 March 1902, he oversaw a match between Espanyol and Irish FC in the FGE Medal tournament, where he showed his impartiality by awarding a penalty kick to Irish, who went on to lose anyway (2–5). His keen understanding of the rules were key to both his refereeing career and his captaincy, being also noted for his serious and energetic nature and for never cowered in front of the forwards.

Carril then helped Español win the first edition of the Campionat de Catalunya in 1903–04. He remained loyal to the club until 1905, when Español had to suspend its activities due to a lack of players since most of them were university students who enrolled to study at universities outside Catalonia in the 1905–06 academic year. Most of the remaining players, including him, Ángel Ponz, and goalkeeper Pedro Gibert, joined the ranks of X Sporting Club.

=== Later career ===
Together with Gibert and Ponz, Carril helped X win a three-peat of Catalan championships between 1906 and 1908. Due to his serious and energetic character as well as being a great connoisseur of the rules of football, he was chosen as team captain. In January 1909, Espanyol was effectively relaunched as the Club Deportivo Español, the name which still stands today. In the 1908–09 season, he only played friendly matches with Español before deciding to hang up his boots.

== International career ==
In 1902 and 1903, Carril played several matches for the Barcelona City Team.

On 13 April 1904, Carril made his debut for Catalan national team in only their second-ever match, which ended in a 2–3 loss to Sportsmen's Club. In the following month, on 29 May, Carril played for Espanyol against Catalonia, helping his side to a 4–1 victory.

On 17 January 1905, Carril earned another cap for Catalonia against the Sportsmen's Club at Espanyol's field, the Hospital Clínic, featuring in defense alongside Miguel Morris as the match finished with an unknown score. On 13 May 1906, he played for Catalonia against Madrid FC at the Barça field, helping his side to a 5–2 win.

== Death ==
Carril died in Barcelona on 2 April 1948, at the age of 64.

== Honours ==
RCD Espanyol

- Copa Macaya:
  - Champions: 1902–03
- Copa Barcelona:
  - Runner-up: 1902–03
- Catalan Championships:
  - Champions: 1903–04

X Sporting Club

- Catalan Championships:
  - Champions (3) 1905–06, 1906–07 and 1907–08
