= Luciano Lizárraga =

Spanish footballer

Personal information
- Full name: Luciano Lizárraga Goenaga
- Date of birth: 13 March 1881
- Place of birth: Hernani, Gipuzkoa, Spain
- Date of death: 3 May 1960 (aged 79)
- Place of death: Vitória, Espírito Santo, Brazil
- Positions: Defender; midfielder

Senior career*
Years	Team	Apps	(Gls)
1900–1901	Sociedad Española		
1903–1904	Moderno FC		
1904–1905	Madrid FC		
1906–1907	FC Barcelona		
- * Club domestic league appearances and goals

Luciano Lizárraga Goenaga (13 March 1881 – 3 May 1960) was a Spanish footballer who played as a defender and midfielder for Madrid FC and FC Barcelona, although he never actually played an official match with the Catalan side. Either way, he is considered one of the second-ever player to play for both FC Barcelona and Madrid FC, only after Alfonso Albéniz.

== Playing career ==
=== Sociedad Española ===
Luciano Lizárraga was born in Hernani on 13 March 1881, but it was in Barcelona where he began to play football. On 24 September 1900, the 19-year-old Lizarraga was one of the footballers who played in the first match of Sociedad Española, now known as RCD Espanyol, which was held on the Plaza de las Armas. He alternated the defensive demarcation with the midfield. Three months later, on 23 December, he started in the first-ever Derbi Barceloní in history at the Hotel Casanovas field, which ended in a 0–0 draw.

Together with Ángel Ponz, Joaquim Carril, Julián Mora, Telesforo Álvarez, and club founders Octavi Aballí and Ángel Rodríguez, he represented Espanyol in the very first Spanish club to win an official title, the 1900–01 Copa Macaya, which was the first football competition played on the Iberian Peninsula. He played in the opening three matches between January and February 1901, including two wins over Franco-Española and Tarragona to help his side to a third-place finish behind FC Barcelona and the winners Hispania AC.

=== Madrid FC ===
In 1903, Lizárraga then moved to the capital, where he joined Moderno FC, a club that ended up merging with Madrid FC. In his only season at Madrid (1904–05), Lizarraga won the Copa del Rey in 1905, starting in the final against Athletic Bilbao, which ended in a 1–0 victory.

=== FC Barcelona ===
Lizárraga then returned to Barcelona, and although accounts differ, he either joined the ranks of FC Barcelona at the start of the 1905–06 season or sat out one year before making the switch. He played two unofficial matches for the first team, both in the Copa Salut, making his debut in a 1–1 draw with Català FC on 30 September 1906 and then playing his last match two weeks later, on 14 October, scoring once in a 3–1 victory over X Sporting Club. In doing so, he became only the second-ever player to play for both FC Barcelona and Madrid FC, after Alfonso Albéniz, and the first-ever to have gone directly from Madrid to Barcelona, four years ahead of Enrique Normand.

== Honours ==
Madrid FC

- Copa del Rey:
  - Champions (1): 1905
