= José Maria Tormo =

Spanish footballer (1894–1970)

José María Tormo
Personal information
- Full name: José María Tormo Tarrés
- Date of birth: 22 July 1894
- Place of birth: Barcelona, Catalonia, Spain
- Date of death: 4 January 1970 (aged 75)
- Place of death: Barcelona, Catalonia, Spain
- Position: Forward

Senior career*
Years	Team	Apps	(Gls)
1909–1912	Salut SC		
1912–1913	Casual		
1913–1916	Espanyol		
- * Club domestic league appearances and goals

José María Tormo Tarrés (22 July 1894 – 4 January 1970) was a Spanish footballer who played as a forward for Espanyol. Besides football, he also played tennis.

== Biography ==
Born in Barcelona on 22 July 1894, Tormo began his football career in 1909, aged 15, playing as a forward for Salut SC, with whom he played for three seasons, standing out as an excellent goalscorer. In May 1912, Salut reached an agreement to merge with Casual FC, becoming a section of it and adopting the name Team Casual of the Salud Sport Club, or simply Casual SC. Tormo was one of the few Salut players who become a regular starter in the first team of Casual, which was mainly made up of former FC Barcelona players, such as José Quirante, the Comamala brothers (Carles and Arsenio), the Wallace brothers (Charles and Percy), and Romà Solà.

In March 1913, Casual participated in the most important tournament of its short history, the fourth edition of the Pyrenees Cup, with Tormo starting for Casual in the quarterfinals against Barça, which ended in a humiliating 7–0 loss. When the club disappeared in June 1913, some of its players joined RCD Espanyol, such as the Wallace brothers and Tormo, and together, they helped their new club win the 1914–15 Catalan championship after beating Barça 4–0 in the title-deciding play-off; Tormo scored a second-half brace, thus contributing decisively for Espanyol's triumph. Those two goals saw him finish that season with seven goals, which was enough to make him the tournament's top scorer, with one more than runner-up José Segarra of FC Barcelona. He stayed loyal to the club for three years, until 1916, scoring a total of 16 goals in 30 official matches.

In 1947, during the presidency of José Salas Painello, he worked as a director of Espanyol.

Espada died in Barcelona on 4 January 1970, at the age of 75.

== Honours ==
RCD Espanyol

- Catalan championship: 1914–15
