= Joan Soler =

Joan Soler may refer to:

- Joan Soler (cartographer), (c. 1400), Majorcan cartographer, son of Guillem Soler
- Joan Soler (footballer) (1881-1961), Spanish footballer
- Joan Soler i Amigó (1941-1922), Spanish writer and teacher

== See also ==
- Juan Soler (disambiguation)
