= Antonio Soler =

Antonio Soler may refer to:

- Antonio Soler (composer) (1729–1783), Spanish composer
- Antonio Soler (novelist) (born 1956), Spanish novelist

== See also ==
- Antonio Soller (1840–?), Portuguese pianist
