= Rafael Rodríguez Méndez =

Spanish doctor, author, and politician

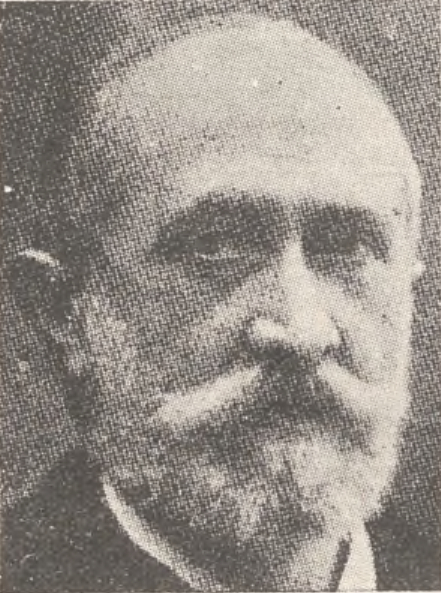
- Rafael Rodríguez
- Born: Rafael Rodríguez Méndez; 1845; Granada, Andalusia, Spain
- Died: 20 September 1919 (aged 73–74); Barcelona, Catalonia, Spain
- Citizenship: Spanish
- Occupations: Doctor; Politician; Author
- Known for: Father of Ángel Rodríguez

2nd President of Spanish Gymnastics Federation
- In office 1900–1902
- Preceded by: José Canalejas y Méndez
- Succeeded by: Joaquín Bonet

Rafael Rodríguez Méndez (1845 – 20 September 1919) was a Spanish doctor, author, and politician. He was rector of the University of Barcelona from 1902 to 1905. He was also director of the San Baudilio de Llobregat asylum, where he stood out for the application of Music Therapy. He is the author of several medical treatises, including the very first medical statistics done in Catalonia.

His son was Ángel Rodríguez, the founder and first president of RCD Espanyol.

== Early life and education ==
Rodríguez was born in 1845 in Granada, as the son of the Granada physician Manuel Rodríguez Carreño (1820–1870), author of the Medical Topography and Statistics of the town of Dalías, Almería. Rodríguez earned a Bachelor of Arts degree in 1863 and then, against his will and just to please his father, he obtained his degree at the Faculty of Medicine of the University of Granada in 1868 where, two years later, in 1870, he obtained his doctorate after having been a boarding student in the Granada capital.

== Academic career ==
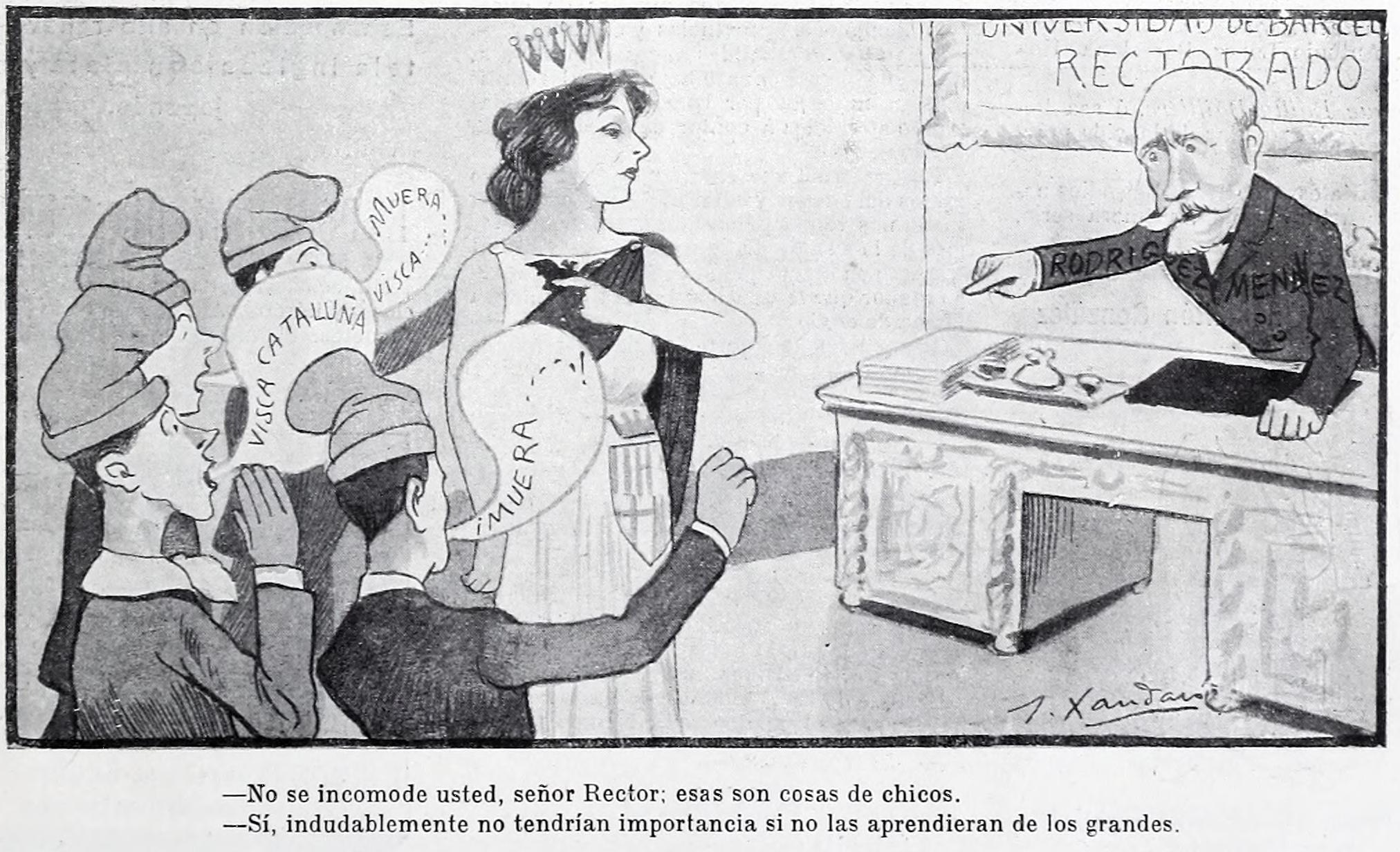
Caricatured by Joaquín Xaudaró.

A man of great university vocation, Rodríguez was an assistant professor of various subjects at the Faculty of Medicine of Granada until 1874, the year in which he won the examinations for the chair of Private and Public Hygiene at the University of Barcelona (UB), a city where he achieved considerable prestige for his valuable master's degree. Having been automatically appointed by the right of the chair, he became the last non-elected academician of the Royal Academy of Medicine and Surgery of Barcelona. Shortly after, he was appointed secretary of the Faculty of Medicine of Barcelona, and in November 1901, he became rector of the UB by Royal Decree, a position from which he resigned in 1905.

With the impulse given to him by his position as rector of the University of Barcelona, Rodríguez promoted a series of Sunday lectures on hygiene topics given by different university professors, including himself, in several Catalan Popular Ateneus, a project that was described as La cultura popular. As a professor, he was greatly admired by the students, and thus he massively filled his classes.

Rodríguez was radically opposed to the Catalanization of the university to the point that, while he was the rector of the UB, he refused to cede the paranymph so that the First Catalan University Congress could be held. In 1903, he refused to admit the use of Catalan at the university when asked by the Association of Catalan University Studies in 1905. At the end of his life, however, he greatly attenuated this initial anti-Catalan attitude. In 1913, he not only became a member of the First Congress of Catalan-Language Doctors but, in 1917, published the communications delivered to him in Catalan in his journal.

== Medical career ==
In Barcelona, Rodríguez had a frenetic lifestyle, participating in several teaching, educational, social, and political activities. Already in 1875, together with the pharmacist Francesc Benessat, he founded the Medical Hygiene Center, a pioneering entity in Spain that was born with the desire to provide disinfection, embalming, vaccination services and the dissemination of prophylactic professional practices in accordance with the advances of science.

Rodríguez was the president of the Medical Society El Laboratorio in 1876 and the vice-president of the Academy of Medical Sciences of Catalonia in 1877, as well as president of its Hygiene Section. In that same year, he was named a foreign member of the French Society of Hygiene that had just been created in Paris, where he attended the Hygienic Congress held there, just as he later did in Budapest.

In April 1879, Rodríguez was appointed co-director of the Sant Boi de Llobregat Asylum, a position that he held for three years until his resignation in February 1882. Under his leadership, he introduced several innovations, especially the application of Music Therapy in acute cases. He also recovered the magazine La razón de la sin razón (The reason for the no reason), which had ceased to be published in 1881 following the death of its creator Antonio Pujadas. In 1883, he presented a report entitled El Manicomio: Notas clínicas, which was based in his experiences at the Asylum, in the First Spanish Frenopátic Competition which was organized by professor Joan Giné i Partagàs and held in Barcelona. Together with Bartomeu Robert, Ignasi Valentí, Antoni Mola, and Artur Galceran, he formed part of the review board of presentations.

Rodríguez was secretary general of the International Congress of Medicine held on the occasion of the 1888 Barcelona Universal Exposition. He would go on to preside over the Sixth Section of the First Education Congress of 1909 and of the First International Tuberculosis Congress of 1910.

== Politic career ==
A man of liberal temperament, progressive, and attracted by politics with ties to the Radical Republican Party led by Alejandro Lerroux, Rodríguez was elected deputy for the province of Barcelona in the General Elections of 1905. In the following year, however, he resigned from his seat for health reasons.

== Author ==
Rodríguez was a prolific author of several texts and medical works, such as Fiebre amarilla (1870), Tratamiento del hidrocele (1876), and of an obituary of the doctor Lluís Comenge i Ferrer (1917). He was also a contributor to numerous professional magazines, many from Barcelona such as Revista Frenopática Española, La Higiene para todos, Boletín del Ateneo de Alumnos Internos de la Facultad de Medicina de Barcelona, El Protector de la Infancia, Boletín de la Academia of Hygiene or Medical Independence. Some were from other Catalan capitals, such as La Medicina Contemporánea de Reus and La Unión Médica de Lleida, but many others were from various places outside Catalonia, such as Revista Médica de Sevilla, Crónica de Ciencias Médicas de Manila, La Prensa Médica and La Gaceta Médica de Granada. He also contributed to many from Madrid, such as La Medicina, El Siglo Médico, La Aspiración Médica, Revista de Medicina y Cirugía Prácticas, and España Médica, and even some outside of Spain, such as the Journal d’Hygiene from Paris, and Crónica Médico-Cirúrgica from Havana, Et cetera.

In 1877, Rodríguez stood out as director of the Revista de Higiene, a branch of the publication Medicina y Cirurgía Prácticas. In 1878, Rodríguez was one of the founders of the Gaceta Médica de Cataluña, a fortnightly magazine that he directed for over forty years, from the publication of its first issue until his death in 1919. This magazine, which has great influence in the country, was published until 1921, when it took the name of Gaceta Médica Catalana to continue being the showcase for current affairs in the different medical fields, both national and international. Rodríguez created a section on Hygiene with original articles such as the one that he himself wrote: Estadística Demogràfica Sanitària de Catalunya, a work that can be considered the very first medical statistics done in Catalonia.

Rodríguez was also a reviewer of the translations of several works such as the Tratado elemental de las enfermedades de la mujer by A. Elleaume from 1873 and the Tratado de Patología Interna by K.F. Kunze from 1877.

== Sporting career ==
Along with David Ferrer Mitayna, Rodríguez was one of the founders of the Catalan Gymnastics Association in 1897 and, in the following year, when the Spanish Gymnastics Federation was founded, he was elected president of the Provincial Executive Committee of this entity in which he participated very actively. In December 1899, Rodríguez was elected as the second president of the federation, effectively replacing José Canalejas in 1900, with Ferrer as its vice president and Narciso Masferrer as its secretary. He held the presidency of the federation for two years until 1902, when he was replaced by Joaquín Bonet.

He is also a member of the Barcelona Society of Friends of the Country and a member of the Spanish Astronomy Association.

== Personal life ==
Rodríguez married Catalina Trinidad Ruiz de los Cobos, and the couple had two sons: Rafael Rodríguez Ruiz (1880–1942) who became a doctor like his father, and Àngel Rodríguez Ruiz, an engineer and the founder and first president of RCD Espanyol. The passion for football of his son became so intense that in 1901, his father, sent him to study in Liège, Belgium.

Rodríguez was also the uncle of Diego Ruiz Rodríguez who lived with the Rodríguez Ruiz couple when he was orphaned.

== Death and legacy ==
Rodríguez died in Barcelona on 20 September 1919, at the age of either 73 or 74 years old.

A year before he died, on the occasion of his retirement at the age of 72, although he was subsequently authorized to continue as a teacher at the faculty, he was honored with a book in his honor written by his admirers and friends and published on the occasion of the fifth anniversary of his medical degree in 1868.

A year later, in Barcelona, a National Committee was set up with the aim of perpetuating the memory of Professor Rafael Rodríguez Méndez, which projected several tributes, such as placing plaques on the houses where he lived, the request for a street of the Ciutat Comtal and other activities that, in the end, were not carried out. In the end, however, he still got a street named after him, but in Palma de Mallorca.

== Works ==
- Fiebre amarilla (1870)
- Tratamiento del hidrocele (1876)
- Lluís Comenge i Ferrer (1917)
- Higiene privada y pública (1880)
