= Joan Soler i Amigó =

Catalan writer and teacher (1941–2022)

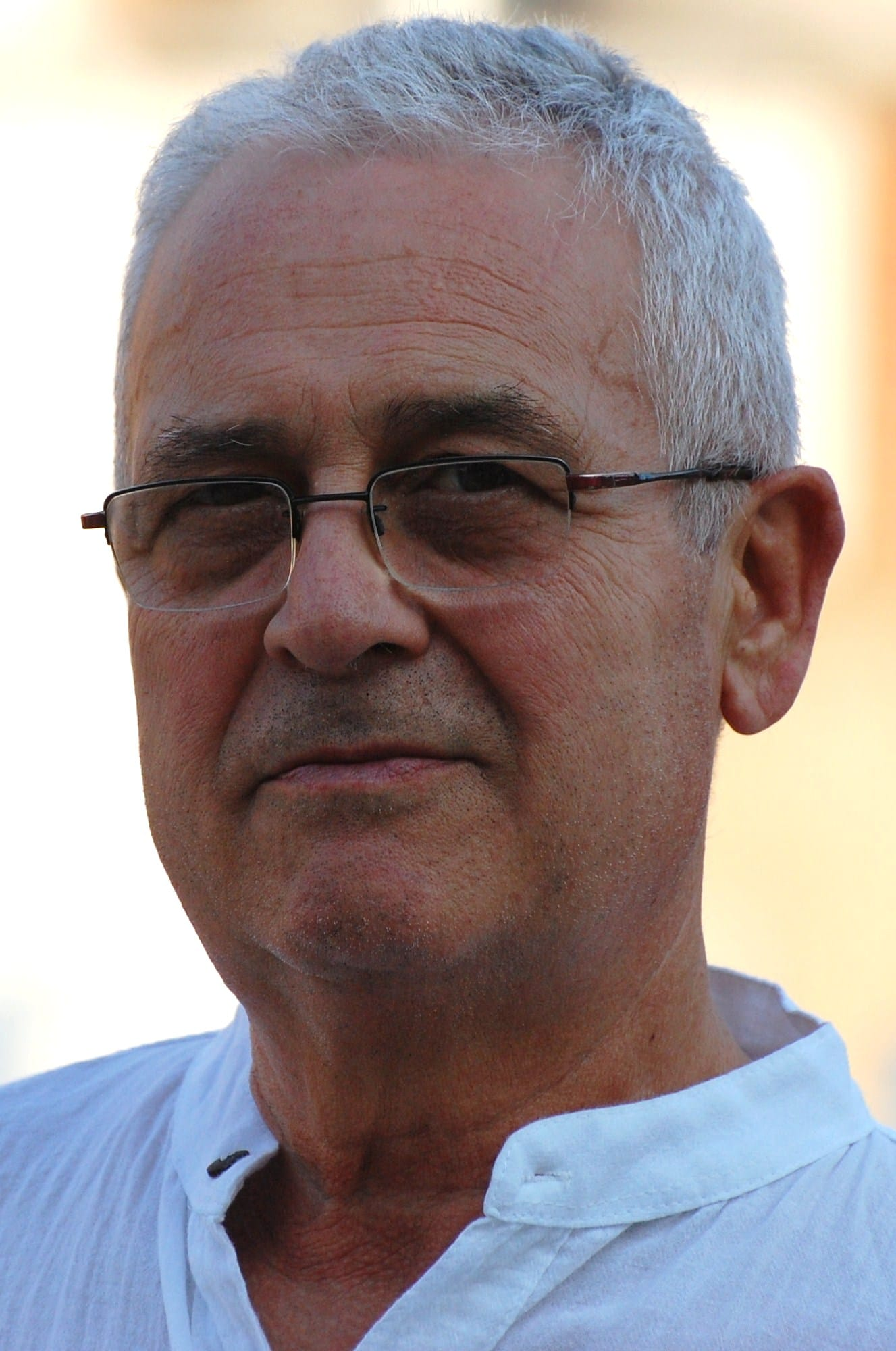

Member of the Municipal Council of Badalona
- In office 1979–1983

Personal details
- Born: 10 June 1941 Badalona, Catalonia, Spain
- Died: 1 January 2022 (aged 80)
- Party: PSUC
- Occupation: Writer, teacher

Joan Soler i Amigó (10 June 1941 – 1 January 2022) was a Catalan writer and teacher.

== Biography ==
Born in Badalona, Soler studied philosophy and literature at the University of Barcelona, where he earned his teaching license in 1975. He worked for the city of Badalona as an education technician before serving on its municipal council from 1979 to 1983 as a member of the Unified Socialist Party of Catalonia.

Soler's work centered around research on popular culture, exhibited in his many works on modern culture in Catalonia. He also directed "Tradicionari", an encyclopedia of popular culture in Catalonia published in ten volumes by the Gran Enciclopèdia Catalana. Devoted to childhood education, he worked as a screenwriter for the cartoon Història de Catalunya, broadcast on Televisió de Catalunya from 1988 to 1989.

In 1979, Soler was awarded the Crítica Serra d'Or Award for Festes tradicionals de Catalunya and the Premi Baldiri Reixach in 1982 for Barres i onades: relats d'història de Badalona. In 2006, he was awarded the Premi Nacional de Cultura Popular, given by the Generalitat de Catalunya, for his work on the development of "Tradicionari" throughout his career. He received the Creu de Sant Jordi in 2018.

Soler i Amigó died on 1 January 2022, at the age of 80.

== Works ==
- Història de Catalunya (1978)
- Festes tradicionals de Catalunya (1979)
- Barres i onades: relats d'història de Badalona (1982)
- Maig major: història de les festes de Maig a Badalona (1985)
- Camí ral (1986)
- Fiestas de los pueblos de España (1988)
- Cuentos populares de España (1989)
- A Catalunya és festa! (1989)
- Mitologia catalana (1990)
- L'Orfeó Català, un cant i una senyera (1991)
- Els enllocs. Els temps i els horitzons de la utopia (1995)
- Petita història d'Antoni Puigvert (1996)
- Enciclopèdia de la fantasia popular catalana (1998)
- Sant Jordi. La diada. La tradició. L'actualitat (2000)
- D'on vénen els nens i com se fan segons la tradició popular (2003)
- Las Chicas Del Maíz (2004)
- Tradicionari. Enciclopèdia de la cultura popular de Catalunya (2005)
- El rei Jaume I el Conqueridor entre la història i la llegenda (2008)
- Joana Vidal, folklorista (2010)
