= Joaquim Escardó =

Spanish footballer

Personal information
- Full name: Joaquim Escardó Salazar
- Date of birth: 2 January 1882
- Place of birth: Barcelona, Spain
- Date of death: 22 December 1957 (aged 75)
- Positions: Goalkeeper; forward

Senior career*
| Years | Team | Apps | (Gls) |
| 1900–1901 | Club Español | 2 | (1) |
| 1901–1903 | Irish FC | | |
| 1903–1904 | Espanyol | | |
- * Club domestic league appearances and goals

Joaquim Escardó Salazar (2 January 1882 – 22 December 1957) was a Spanish Sports journalist and footballer who played as a goalkeeper for Club Español (now known as RCD Espanyol). As a player, he won the 1903–04 Catalan Championship, but he found greater professional success through his journalist work, being a match press reporter for newspapers such as Los Deportes, for whom he published what is now regarded as the oldest photo of a football team in Spain.

== Biography ==
Born in Barcelona, Escardó was one of the founding members of Club Español de Fútbol in 1900. He then become one of the first footballers of the newly formed Club Español, playing mainly in the second and third teams. In 1901 he was a founder, manager, and player of Irish FC.

In the 1903–04 season, Escardó helped the B side win the second category, known as Copa Moritz, where he also performed as a striker. For the first team, however, he was put under the posts, and together with Ángel Ponz, Ángel Rodríguez, and Gustavo Green, he helped Español win the first edition of the Catalan championship in 1903–04, before retiring at the end of the season.

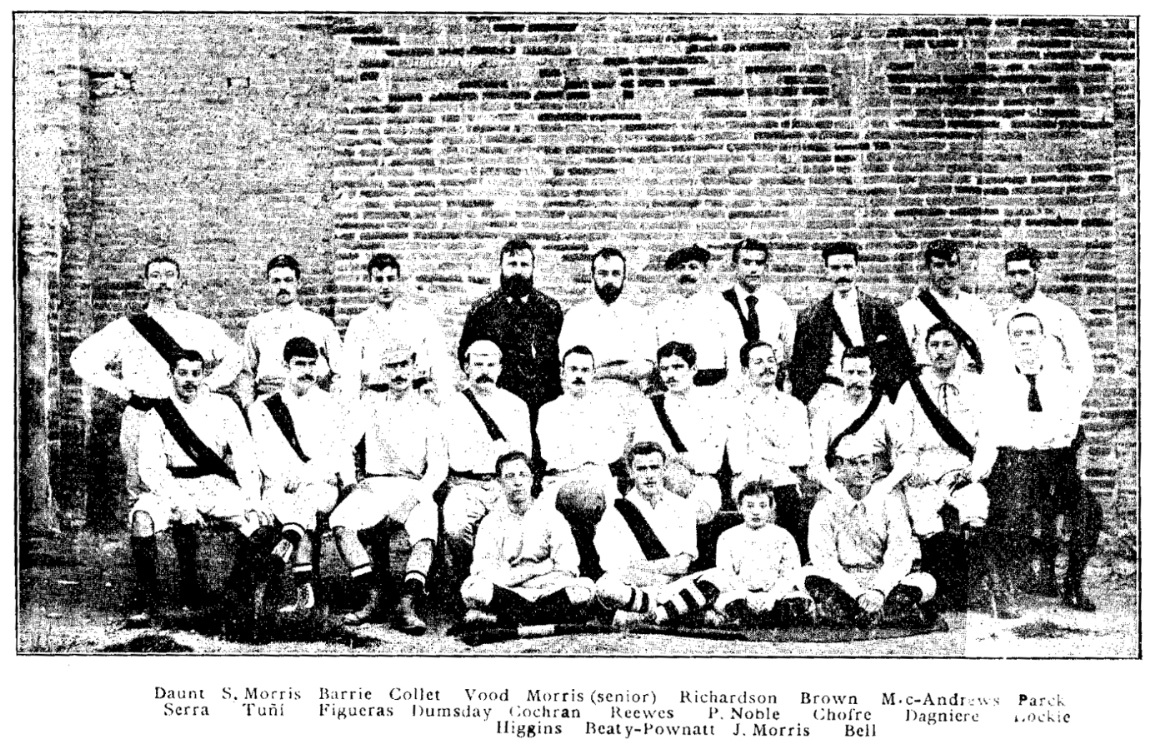
The two sides of the then-existing Barcelona Football Club. It was taken on 12 March 1893, and its the oldest image of a football team in Spain.

He also excelled as a journalist, being a match press reporter for newspapers such as Los Deportes. On 6 January 1906, Escardó published in Los Deportes a report about the football game of the 1890s and especially on a match played on 12 March 1893 between two teams (Blues v Reds) of the Barcelona Football Club. In the article, there is even a picture of the 22 footballers that played that match, plus the referee and a young boy who watched from the stands, Miguel Morris, the younger brother of Samuel (standing, second from the left) and Enrique (wearing a beret). Escardó did not date it exactly (“The two sides of the then-existing Barcelona Football Club formed around the years from 1892 to 1895…”), but the coincidence of the players and referee in the photo with the line-ups of the chronicle of the game suggests that this engraving corresponds to the match played on 12 March. This photograph is now widely regarded as the oldest photo of a football team in Spain. In addition to the Morris brothers, other notable figures in the photo include the omnipresent James Reeves and the first Catalans known to play football such as Alberto Serra, Tuñí, Chofre, Barrié, and Figueras (members of Club Regats).

== Honours ==
=== Club ===
RCD Espanyol

- Catalan Championships:
  - Winners (2) 1903–04
