= Nuevo Velódromo de Barcelona =

Sports venue in Barcelona (1901–1903)

- Interactive map of Nuevo Velódromo de Barcelona
- Location: Barcelona, Catalonia, Spain

Construction
- Opened: 24 September 1893
- Demolished: 1910
- Cost: 30.000 pesetas

Tenants
- Hispania AC (1900–03) Irish FC (1903–1903) X Sporting Club (1903–1905) RCD Espanyol (1903–1905)

The Nuevo Velódromo de Barcelona (Spanish: New Barcelona Velodrome), also known as the Velódromo de la calle Aragón, was a sports venue located in Carrer Aragó, Barcelona, Spain that operated between June 1901 and 1903. It was the second velodrome in the city. In addition to cycling events, it also hosted football matches, being the playing field of Hispania AC and X Sporting Club, two of the most notorious rivals of FC Barcelona in the early 20th century.

== History ==
The first stable velodrome in Barcelona was the Velódromo de la Bonanova inaugurated in 1893. However, five years later it stopped hosting cycling events to focus mainly on football practice, thus leaving the city without an optimal track. Nevertheless, the enthusiastic cyclists and bicycle sportsmen were soon able to have a new venue for the practice of their favorite sport. The idea of building a new, more central velodrome came from a group of runners and cycling fans led by Francisco Serramalera Abadal. For this end, they formed the Sociedad Anónima Velódromo (Spanish: Anonymous Velodrome Society), and they took the initiative for the construction of the new cycling track, this time in a place much more central than the previous site of La Bonanova. Once built, the Velo Club settled there after installing a pavilion and headquarters for its members right next to the grounds of the new velodrome. The chosen land was located on Carrer Aragó, between the Muntaner and Casanova streets, near Pont del Mico, with its main access door at the intersection of the first two. The track, made of cement on the straight lines and wooden on the curves, had a length of 250 meters.

The construction began in July 1900, although it was not officially inaugurated until 29 June 1901. The inaugural festival, which lasted for two days, included many activities: juniors, amateurs, professional, international, tandem, and pedestrian. The most outstanding test was the Gran Premio del Nuevo Velódromo de Barcelona, which was won by Abadal, who took home a prize of 500 pesetas. Narciso Masferrer presided over the jury. The Nuevo Velódromo was the first of four velodromes built in central neighborhoods of Barcelona, all of them with ephemeral life. The Nuevo Velódromo was inaugurated in June 1901 and ceased its activity in 1903 to be followed by the Parc de la Ciutadella (1904), la pista de Las Arenas (1907–1910), Velódromo Parc de Sports (March 1909–1911) was built.

Although the new venue was initially ruled out for football practice due to its insufficient dimensions and small size, the central field was eventually used for football practice, just as it had happened with the Bonanova velodrome. It was the first playing field of Hispania Athletic Club, which played its first match there against Sociedad Deportiva Santanach, ending in a goalless draw, on 14 October 1900, when the velodrome was still being built. Hispania played there until it disappeared as a club in 1903. In that same year, the Nuevo Velódromo was occupied by Irish FC, but the club collapsed shortly after. In the summer of 1903, RCD Espanyol and X Sporting Club began to play their home games at the Velódromo de la calle Aragón, and they kept doing so until 1905 when both clubs moved to Campo de la Calle Marina. Two years later it was rented to FC Barcelona until at the beginning of 1909 it moved to the field located on the neighboring Calle de Industria.

== Decline and Collapse ==
The press of the time was critical of the quality of the facilities and it thus had a very short-lived, disappearing in 1903. Later that same year, on 25 October 1903, the People's House of the Radical Republican Party of Alejandro Lerroux was built on the land that had been occupied by the velodrome.
