= Juan Soler =

Juan Soler may refer to:

- Juan Soler (businessman) (born 1956), Spanish businessman and president of Valencia CF
- Juan Soler (actor) (born 1966), Argentine actor, model, and rugby union footballer

== See also ==
- Joan Soler (disambiguation)
