= Antonio Soller =

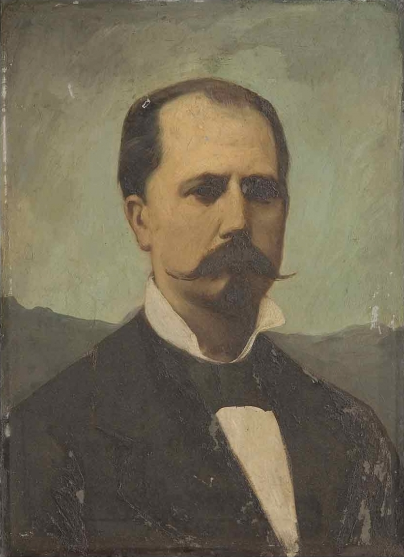
António Soller (1882), by Francisco José Resende. Fernando de Castro Museum, Porto.

Antonio Soller (10 August 1840 in Lisbon – ?) was a Portuguese pianist and composer.

He studied painting and music. Later, he lived in France, Italy and Belgium, and in 1884, he dedicated a march titled Heroism to King Humbert. He composed various triumphal and funeral marches.

Autograph letters from Antonio Soller to Charles Malherbe survive from 1902, placing his date of death in the 20th century, but at present his exact date of death is unknown to scholarship

== Selected works ==
- L'etoíle d'Espagne, tanda de valses
- Chant des oisseaux
- La source, capricho brillante
- Los cloches de Westminster, nocturno
- Tarantela
- Polonesa
- Scherzo
- Sinfonia à Gran Orquesta
- Souvenir d'Alsace
- A vivandeira, operetta
