= José Irízar =

Spanish footballer (1882–1935)

Personal information
- Full name: José Marcelino Yrízar Urbizu
- Date of birth: 5 October 1882
- Place of birth: Bilbao, Biscay, Spain
- Date of death: 28 March 1935 (aged 52)
- Place of death: Barcelona, Catalonia
- Position: Defender

Senior career*
Years	Team	Apps	(Gls)
1903–1907	Athletic Club		
1907–1909	X Sporting Club		
1909–1911	CD Español		
1911–1914	FC Barcelona	21	(0)
1914–1918	Athletic Club		

International career
1910-1912	Catalonia	5	(0)
- * Club domestic league appearances and goals

José Marcelino Yrízar Urbizu (5 October 1882 - 23 March 1935), better known as José Irízar was a Spanish footballer who played as a defender for Athletic Club and FC Barcelona. Although he always appeared as Irizar in the sports press, on his baptismal and death certificates his surname is written with a y.

== Club career ==
Born in Bilbao, he began his career in 1903 with his hometown club Athletic Club. In the 1904 Copa del Rey Final, Athletic were declared winners after their opponents, Club Español de Madrid, failed to turn up. He was then a fundamental piece in the Athletic side that reached the final of the Copa del Rey three consecutive seasons (1905-1907), although each a loss to Madrid FC. He then joined X Sporting Club, where he formed a great defensive partnership with Santiago Massana and goalkeeper Pedro Gibert, winning two Catalan championships in 1907 and 1908. In 1909, the club was effectively relaunched as the Club Deportivo Español, and he become the team's first-ever captain after the re-foundation. He remained loyal to the club until 1911, when his constant good performances drew the attention of FC Barcelona, who signed him in 1911, making his debut on 19 November in a 17-1 win over Català.

He was a member of the legendary Barcelona team of the early 1910s, that also included the likes of Francisco Bru, Alfredo Massana, Enrique Peris and Carles Comamala, which won back-to-back Copa del Rey titles in 1912 and 1913, helping his side keep a clean-sheet in the 1912 final in a 2-0 win over Sociedad Gimnástica. He also helped the Catalan club win two Pyrenees Cups titles in 1912 and 1913 and one Catalan Championships in 1912–13. He played for Barcelona until 1914, when he returned to Athletic Club, where he retired in 1918.

== International career ==
Like many other FC Barcelona of his time, he played several matches for the Catalan national team in the early 1910s, being one of the eleven footballers who played in the team's first-ever game recognized by FIFA on 20 February 1912, which ended in a 0-7 loss to France.

== Personal life ==
Irízar was the only child of a wealthy couple from Bilbao. His condition allowed him the luxury and prestige of studying in Leuven, Belgium. However, while an Athletic player, he fell in love with Ana, a young woman from a humble family who had emigrated to the Biscayan capital from Herrera de Pisuerga, in Palencia, to be educated in Los Ángeles Custodios. They got married and at least four of the five children they had were born in Barcelona, where Irizar played between 1911 and 1914. In fact, his teammates at Barcelona such as Enrique Peris, Romà Forns or Manuel Amechazurra, used to call him "the father" because he already had children.

Irizar died on 28 March 1935, at the age of 52, and was buried in the Montjuïc cemetery. His wife Ana continued to live in Barcelona, where she would die almost 40 years later, in 1973.

== Honours ==
=== Club ===
Athletic Club

- Copa del Rey:
  - Champions (1): 1904
  - Runner-up (3): 1905, 1906 and 1907

X Sporting Club

- Catalan championships
  - Champions (2): 1907 and 1908

Barcelona

- Catalan championships
  - Champions (1): 1912–13
- Copa del Rey:
  - Champions (2): 1912 and 1913
- Pyrenees Cup:
  - Champions (2): 1912 and 1913
