= Irish FC =

Football club in Spain active between 1901 and 1903

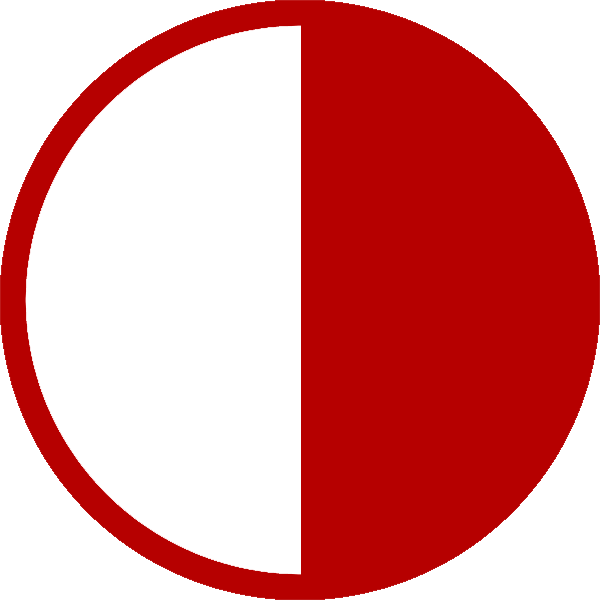
- Irish Football Club
- Full name: Irish Football Club
- Short name: Irish FC
- Founded: 27 October 1901
- Dissolved: Autumn of 1903
- Ground: Nuevo Velódromo de Barcelona
- League: Catalan championship
Home colours

The Irish Football Club, commonly referred to as Irish FC, was a football team based in Barcelona, Catalonia, Spain, which existed from 1901 until its dissolution in the autumn of 1903.

Great figures emerged from Irish FC, such as Carles Comamala, Juli Marial, Romà Forns, and Joaquim Escardó.

== History ==
=== Origins ===
Irish Football Club was founded on 27 October 1901, from the merger of Espanyol Infantil (Español FC) and Club Catalunya (Catalonia FC). The club's board of directors was subsequently elected, with Carles Renter as the first president, Rogelio Serra as vice-president, Joaquin García as Secretary, Andrés Camps as treasurer, Juan Gost as Account Auditor ("Revisor de Cuentas"), and Joaquín Escardó as Head of Materials. Renter was later replaced by Juli Marial, who played as a goalkeeper from the club's foundation in 1901 until its dissolution in 1903. Carles Comamala was also a founding member, while Forns only joined later in 1902, at the age of 17.

In the chronicle of a match between Irish FC and Club Español on 20 March 1902, the sports journalist Alberto Serra stated in La Vanguardia that "the "Iris" wore its new and attractive white and scarlet uniform". The club wore a shirt half white and half red with white trousers. The club played its matches at the Nuevo Velódromo de Barcelona on Carrer Aragó, which they had to share with Hispania AC for the first few months until January 1902, when Hispania moved to Camp del Carrer Muntaner.

=== Tournaments ===
In the first two years of his life, the club only competed in friendly matches and minor tournaments organized by the Spanish Gymnastics Federation, such as the 1902 Medal of the Spanish Gymnastics Federation between February and June 1902, where it finished in third place only behind the dean clubs of the city, Català FC and the second team of FC Barcelona; and the 1902 Copa Pergamino between September and November 1902 (during the festivities of La Mercè), which had been created for the clubs founded in the 1901–02 season, and where it was runner-up only behind once again of the second team of FC Barcelona. On 20 March 1902, Irish FC faced Club Español in the FGE Medal tournament, but even though they were playing at home, they still lost 2–5, with the consolation goals coming from Sanz and Renter, with the latter scoring from a penalty kick given by the referee of the match, Joaquim Carril.

On 12 November 1902, along with other clubs such as FC Barcelona, Hispania AC, Català FC, and Universitari SC, he was one of the founding members of the Football Clubs Association, which four years later became the Catalan Football Federation.

In 1903, Irish FC participated in its most important tournament, the Copa Barcelona, where it finished in fifth place.

== Decline and collapse ==
Irish FC played its last known match against FC Barcelona on 18 October 1903, which ended in a 2–3 loss. The club then disappeared after its dissolution in the autumn of 1903, and its field was occupied by X Sporting Club.

With the disappearance of Irish FC, most of its players joined FC Barcelona at the beginning of the 1903–04 season, such as Comamala, Forns, and Marial, with the latter going on to become the 6th President of FC Barcelona, while the former two became key players in Barça's first golden team of the early 1910s.
