= Emilio Sampere =

Spanish footballer and coach (1895–1956)

Personal information
- Full name: Emilio Sampere Oliveras
- Birth name: Emili Sampere i Oliveras
- Date of birth: 30 June 1895
- Place of birth: Barcelona, Catalonia, Spain
- Date of death: 5 October 1956 (aged 61)
- Place of death: Barcelona, Catalonia, Spain
- Positions: Midfielder; forward

Senior career*
Years	Team	Apps	(Gls)
1902–1903	X Sporting Club		
1903–1906	Club Español		
1906–1909	X Sporting Club		
1909–1912	RCD Espanyol		

International career
1916–1917	Catalonia	6	(0)

Managerial career
- 1927–1930: Real Murcia
- 1930–1932: Real Betis
- 1933–1935: Real Oviedo
- * Club domestic league appearances and goals

Emilio Sampere Oliveras (8 January 1885 – 4 December 1966) was a Spanish footballer, referee and manager. He was one of the most important figures in the amateur beginnings of RCD Espanyol as a player, captain, club founder, manager, and director.

Sampere played as a forward during the 1900s, but then moved to the midfield in the 1910s.

== Club career ==
Born in Barcelona, the 17-year-old Sampere was one of the founders of X Sporting Club, which was established under the name of Football Club X in March 1902; he then began his football career there, becoming the club's captain. At the end of the 1902–03 season, he joined RCD Espanyol as a forward, becoming one of the first great footballers the club had.

Together with Joaquim Escardó, Ángel Ponz, and Gustavo Green, Sampere was part of the team that won the first edition of the Campionat de Catalunya in 1903–04. In 1904, he displayed a varied activity in the athletic meetings organized in Barcelona that year and in the following one.

Sampere remained loyal to the club until 1905, when Español had to suspend its activities due to a lack of players since most of them were university students who enrolled to study at universities outside Catalonia in the 1905–06 academic year. Most of the remaining players, including him, Ponz, and goalkeeper Pedro Gibert, joined X Sporting Club. Together with them, plus the Massana brothers (Santiago and Alfredo) and José Irízar, Sampere helped X win the Campionat de Catalunya three times in a row between 1906 and 1908.

Sampere, along with the founder of Club Español de Jujitsu, Julià Clapera, convene a meeting of members of both clubs to refound Español C.F. JULIÀ CLAPERA is named president and SAMPERE the team captain. The new Club Deportivo Español has jujitsu, fencing and boxing sections. The playing field is located on Calle Marina, where today the Monumental Bullring is located. He helped in the re-foundation of Español in 1909, after the suspension of activities occurred three years earlier due to lack of players. In 1909, Espanyol was effectively relaunched as the Club Deportivo Español, the name which still stands today. Ponz played with Espanyol for three more years, being a member of the great Espanyol side of the 1910s that had the likes of Paco Bru, Emilio Sampere and the Armet brothers (Francisco and Kinké), winning the Campionat de Catalunya for the second time in 1911–12. He retired in 1912.

There was also a Sampere who appeared as a member of the Espanyol team that was runner-up in the 1915 Copa del Rey, he demonstrated great sporting longevity for those years.

== International career ==
As a Espanyol player, Sampere was eligible to play for the Catalonia national team, and in May 1916, he was part of the Catalan team that won the second edition of the Prince of Asturias Cup in 1916, an inter-regional competition organized by the RFEF. In the opening game against a Castile/Madrid XI, he scored once in a 6–3 victory, and then he also started in the decisive match, which ended in a 2–2 draw that enough for the Catalans to win the cup for the first time.

== Refereeing career ==
Sampere began his refereeing career in the early 1920s, overseeing one 1922 Copa del Rey quarterfinal match between Real Unión and Fortuna Vigo on 12 March, which ended in a 4–0 victory for the former, partly thanks to a hat-trick from José Luis Zabala.

== Managerial career ==
Sampere began his managerial career at the helm of Real Murcia, which he coached for three seasons between 1927 and 1930. He replaced Jesús Mendizábal, and when he left, he was replaced by José Planas. He then took charge of Real Betis, the club with which he reached the final of the 1931 Copa del Rey, which they lost 1–3 to Athletic Bilbao. He also led Betis to its first promotion to the first division. He also coached Real Oviedo.

== Later life and death ==
On 18 June 1955, Sampere was the subject of a great tribute from the Catalan Football Federation, which organized two football matches: Espanyol 8–2 Catalan national team and Veterans 5–1 Combined players.

Sampere died in Barcelona on 4 December 1966, at the age of 82.

== Honours ==
=== Club ===
RCD Espanyol

- Copa Macaya:
  - Winners (1) 1902–03
- Catalan Championships:
  - Winners (2) 1903–04, 1911–12

X Sporting Club

- Catalan Championships:
  - Winners (3) 1905–06, 1906–07 and 1907–08

=== International ===
Catalonia

Prince of Asturias Cup:

- Champions (1): 1916
