= José María Miró =

Spanish sports shooter

Personal information
- Born: 18 September 1872 Montevideo, Uruguay
- Died: 16 June 1946 (aged 73) Madrid, Spain

Sport
- Sport: Sports shooting

José María Miró (18 September 1872 – 16 June 1946) was a Spanish sports shooter. He competed in two events at the 1920 Summer Olympics.
