= José Maria Soler =

José Maria Soler may refer to:

- José Maria Soler (mountaineer) (1893–1971), Spanish agronomist and mountaineer
- José María Soler García (1905–1996), Spanish archaeologist, historian, researcher, and folklorist
- José María Soler (1929–2009), better known as Víctor Israel, Spanish film actor
