= FC Internacional =

Football club in Spain active between 1901 and 1922

- Futbol Club Internacional
- Full name: Futbol Club Internacional
- Nickname: Estelados (starred)
- Short name: FC Internacional
- Founded: 1901
- Dissolved: 26 April 1922
- Ground: Campo de Galileo
- League: Catalan championship
Home colours	Away colours	Third colours

The Futbol Club Internacional, commonly referred to as FC Internacional, was a football team based in Barcelona, Catalonia, Spain. Founded in 1901, FC Internacional had an "impasse" in its activities after the 1905–06 academic year, resuming them in 1910 to finally disappear in 1922.

In the 1900s, FC Internacional was one of the leading clubs in Catalan football, finishing as runner-up of the Catalan championship three times in a row between 1904 and 1906, before having to suspend its activities.

Great figures emerged from FC Internacional, such as Paco Bru, Enrique Peris, Domingo Carulla, Ramon Torralba and Josep Samitier.

== History ==
Initially known as Club Internacional de Football, it was founded in 1901. Some players originally from the Philippines played in this team. From 1902 onwards it adopted the name Futbol Club Internacional.

In the mid-1900s, FC Internacional side had a great side that included Paco Bru, Charles Wallace and Enrique Peris, thus being one of the most prominent clubs in Catalonia, finishing as runner-up of the Catalan championship three times in a row between 1904 and 1906, being hedged out by Club Español de Football (now RCD Espanyol) FC Barcelona and X Sporting Club respectively. However, in 1906 FC Internacional had to suspend its activities due to a lack of players, as a good part of the first and second team players, university students, had to leave the city to continue their careers outside of Barcelona, some of them even abroad (Español was also a victim of this). Most of the remaining players, such as the aforementioned three, joined FC Barcelona, with Wallace helping Barça win the 1910 Copa del Rey with a goal in the final while Peris become the first player to reach 200 official matches with the club.

== Revivial ==
In 1910 the club was reborn with the same name and in the 1910–11 season, it took part in the second category of the Catalan Championship, finishing in second. FC Internacional then won that category in back-to-back years, first in 1911–12 with 37 points, just one more than second-placed CE Europa, and again in 1912–13, this time more comfortably as they finished 9 points clear of second-placed CE Sabadell FC, hence ascending to the highest category of Catalan football in 1913–14, a category in which he remained until its disappearance in 1922.

The club's original playing field was located in the neighborhood of Izquierda del Ensanche (Eixample), in front of the Industrial School, and when it resumed its activities in 1910, its new location was on Les Corts, where they began to play its matches in the now-defunct Campo de Galileo.

== Decline and Collapse ==
On 26 April 1922, it merged with the football club Center d'Esports de Sants (C.E. Sants) to form UE Sants, thus disappearing from Catalan football.

== Football kit ==
His uniform consisted of a dark green shirt and white pants, although this later changed to a green and white shirt, and in his last years he wore white and black pants, leaving the green badge on the chest badge.

1901–1906	1910–1913	1914–1918	1918–1922
