= Ángel Rodríguez (footballer, born 1879) =

Spanish football executive

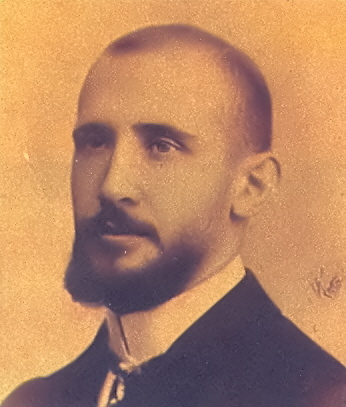
- Ángel Rodríguez

1st President of RCD Espanyol
- In office 28 October 1901 – 1902
- Succeeded by: José María Miró

President of RCD Espanyol
- In office 1909–1910
- Preceded by: Julià Clapera
- Succeeded by: Evelio Doncos

Personal details
- Born: 13 October 1879 Barcelona, Catalonia, Spain
- Died: 10 May 1959 (aged 79) Barcelona, Catalonia, Spain
Association football career
- Full name: Ángel Rodríguez Ruiz
- Position: Forward
Senior career*
Years	Team	Apps	(Gls)
1903–1905	RCD Espanyol		
- * Club domestic league appearances and goals

Ángel Rodríguez Ruiz (13 October 1879 – 10 May 1959) was the founder and first president of the Real Club Deportivo Español. He was also a footballer for the club between 1903 and 1905.

== Biography ==
Ángel Rodríguez was born in Barcelona as the son of Rafael Rodríguez (1845–1949), an Andalusian doctor and politician settled in Catalonia, who was chancellor of the University of Barcelona from 1902 to 1905, and who stood out for his positioning against the use of Catalan language in the University.

In 1900, when he was studying engineering, at the age of 21, Rodríguez became fond of football after watching a match between English sailors and Català FC. When he was unable to join a team, which were made up of foreigners, whose quality was much better than his own, he thus decided to found a Football Society himself. For this reason, together with two friends, classmates from the University, Octavio Aballí and Luis Roca Navarra, he created a football team which was officially established on 28 October 1900 as the Sociedad Española de Fútbol and debuted on 20 January 1901 under the name Club Español de Fútbol, which would later change to Real Club Deportivo Español in 1910. This group of students led by Rodriguez made the nationality of its members its main hallmark: all of them were Catalan or born in the rest of Spain, and thus differed from most other teams, in which there were a large number of foreigners, especially English. That defining characteristic was forever embodied in his name. Rodríguez was the first president of the entity from its foundation until 1901, as well as one of its first-ever players.

His passion for football become so intense that in 1901, his father, sent him to study in Liège, Belgium. He was replaced by José María Miró, who held the presidency for four years, between 1902 and 1906. Despite the distance, he was always informed of the events of the club, and on some occasions, he had to escape from his school to participate in a meeting. Together with Joaquim Escardó, Ángel Ponz, and Gustavo Green, he was part of the team that won the first edition of the Campionat de Catalunya in 1903–04. In the 1909–10 season, at the age of 30, he played a few friendly matches for the club.

Ángel Rodríguez Ruiz was a member of the State Corps of Industrial Engineers. He died in Barcelona on 10 May 1959, at the age of 79.

== Legacy ==
On 6 October 2005, the Plaza de Ángel Rodríguez was inaugurated in honor of the founder of RCD Espanyol de Barcelona. On 28 October 2019, RCD Espanyol paid tribute to Ángel Rodríguez with a commemorative plaque, on the 119th anniversary of Espanyol, with an entourage attended by the vice president of the club and his grandson, José Miguel de Nadal Rodríguez, among others. On 28 October 2020, RCD Espanyol's celebrated its 120th anniversary, and the representatives of the club began the day with a visit to the Sant Gervasi cemetery, where they paid homage to the tomb of Ángel Rodríguez, whose grandson also attended the ceremony.
