= 1902–03 Catalan Football Championship =

Tournament details
- Country: Catalonia
- Dates: 20 November 1902 – 26 April 1903
- Teams: 11

Final positions
- Champions: Club Español (Copa Macaya); FC Barcelona (Copa Barcelona) (1st title)
- Runners-up: Hispania AC (Copa Macaya); Club Español (Copa Barcelona)

Tournament statistics
- Top goal scorer(s): Gustavo Green (7 goals); Joan Gamper (21 goals)

The 1902–03 Catalan Football Championship was the 3rd staging of the Championship of Catalonia. This season was peculiar because it comprised two different competitions held the same year.

Due to disagreements between the reigning champion of the tournament, FC Barcelona, and some of the clubs invited, in 1902–03 two parallel competitions were held: an "official", the Copa Macaya organized by Hispania AC and an "unofficial", the Copa Barcelona organized by FC Barcelona. Both are currently recognized as official by the RFEF.

== Copa Macaya ==
=== Summary ===
The third and last edition of the Macaya Cup was to be contested by 5 teams: Club Espanyol, Hispania AC, FC Barcelona, Club Universitari and FC Internacional. The early resignations of Barcelona and Universitari were a severe blow to the competition, which turned it into a simple triangular tournament. In the end, Espanyol was the champion after beating Hispania 3–1 in a tiebreaker, with Gustavo Green netting twice. Remarkably, Green won all three editions of the Copa Macaya with three different clubs (Hispania, Barça, and Español).

=== Table ===
Pos	Team	Pld	W	D	L	GF	GA	GD	Pts	Qualification or relegation
1	Club Español	4	3	0	1	9	2	+7	6	Champion
2	Hispania AC	4	3	0	1	10	3	+7	6	
3	FC Internacional	4	0	0	4	1	15	−14	0	
4	FC Barcelona (withdrew)	0	0	0	0	0	0	0	0	
5	Universitary SC (withdrew)	0	0	0	0	0	0	0	0	

Source: RSSSF
Rules for classification: 1) points; 2) head-to-head points; 3) head-to-head goal difference; 4) goal difference; 5) number of goals scored; 6) fair-play points; 7) playoff match

=== Results ===
30 November 1902	Hispania AC	'0 – 2 Annulled'	FC Barcelona	Barcelona
			Steinberg; Lassaletta	Stadium: Camp del carrer Muntaner; Referee: Degollada
Note: Barcelona won 2–0, but the result was later disallowed due to Barça fielding an ineligible player.

30 November 1902	Club Español	6 – 0^{1}	FC Internacional	Barcelona
	?

7 December 1902	FC Internacional	1 – 3^{1}	Hispania AC	Barcelona
	?		?

14 December 1902	Club Español	1 – 0^{1}	Hispania AC	Barcelona
	?	[ Report]

4 January 1903	FC Internacional	0 – 1^{1}	Club Español	Barcelona
			?

11 January 1903	Hispania AC	6 – 0^{1}	FC Internacional	Barcelona
	?

25 January 1903	Hispania AC	2 – 1^{1}	Club Español	Barcelona
	?		?

=== Play-off ===
This championship was extremely competitive, in fact, Club Espanyol and Hispania AC finished level on points at 6, which meant that the title had to be decided in a playoff match that was held a few months later.

12 April 1903

Club Espanyol	3–1	Hispania AC
Green; García	Report	Girvan

=== Statistics ===
==== Top Scorers ====
Rank	Player	Team	Goals
1	(Spain) Gustavo Green	Club Español	7
2	(Scotland) Geordie Girvan	Hispania AC	2
3	(Spain) Sebastian Casanellas	Club Español	1
3	(Spain) Emilio Sampere	Club Español	1
3	(Spain) Joaquín García	Club Español	1

== Copa Barcelona ==
=== Summary ===
After their 2–0 win over Hispania AC in the Copa Macaya was declared invalid for fielding an ineligible player, thus losing two points, FC Barcelona withdrew from the tournament as the club considered the decision totally unfounded and unfair. The club then broke its relations with the Gymnastics Federation and decides to organize a tournament of their own: The Copa Barcelona. Barça was able to pull this off because the club was clearly the most powerful and best organized club in Catalonia and one of the best in Spain, just like Madrid FC had done in the capital with the 1902 Copa de la Coronación. All the clubs of the city of Barcelona were invited, including the ones who were contesting the Copa Macaya, and the response from the clubs was much greater than expected, registering up to eleven teams, all of them from Barcelona, although three had to withdraw (X Sporting Club, Universitary SC and FC Catalònia) before the end of the tournament. The other five participating teams were Català FC, FC Internacional, Irish FC, Iberia FC and Salut FC. The Copa Barcelona is also considered an official tournament nowadays, being later recognized as the fourth edition of the Catalan Championship. So two rival competitions were organized (similar to the 1910 and 1913 editions of the Copa del Rey), and while Club Español won the third and last edition of the Copa Macaya after beating Hispania AC by 3–1 in the title-deciding play-off, Barcelona won the Copa Barcelona after a tough fight with Club Español, with whom he drew 2–2 both home and away, hedging out in the end by just two points.

The tournament's board offers prizes to all participants thanks to the financial collaboration of the members of FC Barcelona, with contributions of at least two pesetas and forty cents each. All participants had a prize: A Cup valued at 250 pesetas for the winner; medals for the first three; a lineman's flag for the fourth; a regulation ball for fifth; goalkeeper gloves for the sixth; a bellows for the seventh and a whistle for the last. The prizes may seem ridiculous, in view of today, but at that time it was quite a gesture of greatness for the tournament's board, since these objects were not easy to obtain and were highly valued. Joan Gamper was the star of the tournament and its top goal scorer with 21 goals, netting a 9-goal haul against X Sporting Club on 1 February 1903 and scoring the winner (0–1) against Hispania AC on 19 April 1903.

=== Table ===
Pos	Team	Pld	W	D	L	GF	GA	GD	Pts	Qualification
1	FC Barcelona (C)	14	12	2	0	45	10	+35	26	Champion
2	Club Español	14	11	2	1	34	7	+27	24	
3	FC Internacional	14	9	1	4	30	18	+12	19	
4	Català FC	14	8	0	6	35	26	+9	16	
5	Irish FC	14	4	2	8	25	24	+1	10	
6	FC Internacional	14	3	3	8	14	28	−14	9	
7	Ibèria SC	14	3	1	10	10	25	−15	7	
8	Salut SC	14	0	1	13	6	61	−55	1	
9	X Sporting Club	0	0	0	0	0	0	0	0	(Nota)
10	Club Universitari	0	0	0	0	0	0	0	0	(Nota)
11	Catalònia FC	0	0	0	0	0	0	0	0	(Nota)

Source: https://www.rsssf.org/tablesc/cathist.html
(C) Champions

Notes

- Day 6: Iberia conceded the points due to the death of Ramon Irla i Serra, father of the president and captain of the club.
- Day 8: Salut and Internacional gave up the points.
- Day 11: all three games were suspended due to rain. Irish, Iberia and Salut conceded the points.
- Day 15: Iberia conceded the points due to the death of the mother of the player Castillo.
- Day 16: Salut gave up the points for Espanyol to be playing in the 1902 Copa de la Coronación in Madrid.
- Day 17: Hispania played with the second team to allow the first to contest the final of the Copa Macaya against Club Espanyol.

=== Results ===
The list below only includes the matches played by Barcelona due to a lack of information about the remaining games.

11 January 1903 Round 1	FC Barcelona	7 – 0	Ibèria SC	Barcelona
	Gamper; Ossó; Lassaletta			Stadium: Camp de la carretera d'Horta; Referee: Eduardo Alesson

25 January 1903 Round 3	FC Barcelona	2 – 1	Català FC	Barcelona
	Gamper		Goal	Stadium: Camp de la carretera d'Horta; Referee: Eduardo Alesson

1 February 1903 Round 4	FC Barcelona	13 – 0 *	X Sporting Club	Barcelona
	Gamper; Ossó; Lassaletta			Stadium: Camp de la carretera d'Horta; Referee: Cusí

8 February 1903 Round 6	FC Barcelona	6 – 0	FC Internacional	Barcelona
	Gamper; Ossó; Harris			Stadium: Camp de la carretera d'Horta

22 February 1903 Round 8	FC Barcelona	Not played	Salut SC	Barcelona
				Stadium: Camp de la carretera d'Horta

1 March 1903 Round 9	FC Barcelona	6 – 1	Hispania AC	Barcelona
	Steinberg; Lassaletta; Meyer; Ossó		Goal	Stadium: Camp de la carretera d'Horta; Referee: Emilio Sampere

8 March 1903 Round 10	FC Barcelona	2 – 2	Club Español	Barcelona
15:30	Gamper; Steinberg		Goal	Stadium: Camp de la carretera d'Horta; Attendance: 4.000; Referee: John Hamilton

19 March 1903 Round 12	Irish FC	1 – 4	FC Barcelona	Barcelona
			Gamper; Meyer; Gass	Referee: Acha

22 March 1903 Round 13	Català FC	2 – 4	FC Barcelona	Barcelona
	Goal		Gamper; Steinberg; Lassaletta	Stadium: Velódromo de la Bonanova; Referee: Mascaró

29 March 1903 Round 15	FC Internacional	Not played	FC Barcelona	Barcelona

5 April 1903 Round 16	Ibèria SC	0 – 8	FC Barcelona	Barcelona
			Steinberg; Gamper; Parsons	Referee: Mascaró

12 April 1903 Round 17	Salut SC	Not played	FC Barcelona	Barcelona

13 April 1903 Round 2	FC Barcelona	3 – 1	Irish FC	Barcelona
	Ossó; Almasqué		Goal	Stadium: Camp de la carretera d'Horta; Referee: José Barroso

19 April 1903 Round 18	Hispania AC	0 – 1	FC Barcelona	Barcelona
			Gamper	Stadium: Camp del carrer Muntaner; Referee: Ricardo Cabot

26 April 1903 Round 19	Club Español	2 – 2	FC Barcelona	Barcelona
	García		Gamper; Harris	Stadium: Camp de l'Hospital Clínic; Referee: John Hamilton

- Not counted because X Sporting Club withdrew from the competition.

=== Statistics ===
==== Top Scorers ====
Rank	Player	Team	Goals
1	(Switzerland) Joan Gamper	FC Barcelona	21
2	(Germany) Udo Steinberg	FC Barcelona	6
2	(Spain) Luis de Ossó	FC Barcelona	6
4	(Spain) Bernardo Lassaletta	FC Barcelona	5
5	(England) Stanley Harris	FC Barcelona	3
2	(Switzerland) George Meyer	FC Barcelona	2
2	(Spain) Julià Mora	Club Español	2
2	(Spain) Ángel Ponz	Club Español	2

== See also ==
- 1902–03 FC Barcelona season
