= Francisco Bru =

Spanish footballer, referee and manager

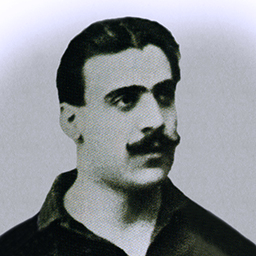
- Bru in 1901

Personal information
- Full name: Francisco Bru Sanz
- Date of birth: 12 April 1885
- Place of birth: Madrid, Spain
- Date of death: 10 June 1962 (age 77)
- Place of death: Málaga, Spain
- Position: Defender

Senior career*
Years	Team	Apps	(Gls)
1902–1906	FC Internacional	27	(0)
1906–1911	FC Barcelona	30	(1)
1911–1915	RCD Español		
1915–1917	FC Barcelona		

International career
1904–1915	Catalan XI		

Managerial career
- 1920: Spain
- 1924–1926: RCD Español
- 1927–1928: Club Juventud Asturiana
- 1928–1929: Racing de Madrid
- 1930: Peru
- 1934–1936: Madrid CF
- 1937–1939: Girona FC
- 1939–1941: Real Madrid
- 1941–1943: Granada CF
- 1948–1949: Real Zaragoza
- * Club domestic league appearances and goals

Francisco Bru Sanz (12 April 1885 – 10 June 1962), also known as Paco Bru, was a Spanish football player, referee and manager. As a footballer he played as a striker and midfielder for FC Internacional and as a defender for FC Barcelona, RCD Español and the Catalan XI. After retiring as a player, Bru became a referee and took charge of the 1916 and 1917 Copa del Rey finals. He later became the first ever manager of Spain, guiding them to the silver medal at the 1920 Olympic Games. As a manager with Real Madrid, then known as Madrid CF, he won the Copa de España twice during the 1930s.

== Playing career ==
Paco Bru began his career in the spring of 1902 with FC Internacional —when he was only sixteen years — playing a friendly tournament called Medalla de la Federación Gimnástica Española (Medal of the Spanish Gymnastics Federation). He played ten out of twelve games as a striker and scored three goals, his team finishing sixth out of seven teams. On 30 November 1902, Bru made his debut in official competition, the Catalan football championship, in a 6–0 defeat to Club Español. Although in this particular match he played as a defender, he was mainly used in Internacional as a forward.

Bru won the Copa Torino in 1904, a second-level league trophy. Two years later he joined FC Barcelona and, along with Romà Forns, helped the club win the Campionat de Catalunya three times in a row between 1909 and 1911. He also helped them win their first Copa del Rey in 1910. In 1911 he joined RCD Español winning two further Campionat titles and playing in another Copa final in 1915. He then returned to FC Barcelona and, together with Paulino Alcántara and Jack Greenwell, helped the club win one more Campionat. During his playing career he also played at least five times for the Catalan XI. However records from the era do not always include accurate statistics and he may have played more games.

== Refereeing career ==
After retiring as a player Bru became a referee. According to legend, before his first game in charge he walked into the dressing room and pulled out a Colt pistol from his bag. He placed the gun on a table in the middle of the room for everybody to see and when finished changing, he stuffed the pistol down his shorts. After being asked by a player what was going on, he explained he wanted to guarantee a quiet match, given that it was his first game in charge. Bru went on to take charge of two Copa del Rey finals. In 1916 he was in charge as Athletic Bilbao beat Madrid FC 4–0. In the 1917 final Madrid FC returned and beat Arenas Club de Getxo. In 1917 Bru also refereed a friendly between the Catalan XI and a Castile XI.

== Coaching career ==
=== Olympic Games ===
In 1920 when the Royal Spanish Football Federation decided to send a team to the Olympic Games, Bru was one of three selectors chosen to pick the squad. However, after an initial training session, he found himself on his own. He subsequently rejected many of the players that turned up for the original session and insisted on the inclusion of more Basque players. With a squad that included Ricardo Zamora, Félix Sesúmaga, Pichichi, José María Belauste and Josep Samitier, Bru and Spain returned from the competition with the silver medal.

The final stages of the tournament had descended into farce. Belgium won the gold medal by default after Czechoslovakia walked off in protest during the final, unhappy with the performance of the referee. As a result, they were disqualified and a second consolation tournament was organised to decide the silver and bronze medallists. However beaten semi-finalists, France, had already returned home, so the beaten quarter-finalists played-off for the right to play the other beaten semi-finalist, the Netherlands. Spain emerged triumphant after overcoming Sweden 2–1, Italy 2–0 and then beating the Netherlands 3–1 in the silver medal final.

=== Real Madrid ===
Bru had two spells as coach at Real Madrid. During his first spell with the club he guided the team to victory in two Copa de España finals. In 1934 he coached a team that included Ricardo Zamora, Josep Samitier and Jacinto Quincoces to a 2–1 win over a Valencia CF team coached by Jack Greenwell. The 1936 final saw Real meet FC Barcelona for the first time in a cup final. The Madrid club beat Barcelona 2–1 at the Mestalla in Valencia. The final is best remembered for a save made by Zamora. During the Spanish Civil War, Bru returned to Catalonia and coached Girona FC in the Mediterranean League. In 1939 he returned to Real Madrid for a second spell as coach.

=== Others ===
Bru was the coach of the Peru national team during the first ever World Cup in 1930.

== Honours ==
=== Player ===
FC Internacional

- Copa Torino: 1904

FC Barcelona

- Copa del Rey: 1910
- Campionat de Catalunya: 1908-09, 1909–10, 1910–11, 1915–16

RCD Español

- Campionat de Catalunya: 1911-12, 1914–15

=== Manager ===
Spain

- Olympic Games: Silver medal 1920

Madrid CF

- Copa de España: 1934, 1936

== Sources ==
- Morbo: The Story of Spanish Football (2003), Phil Ball. Morbo: The Story of Spanish Football
