= Santiago Massana =

Spanish footballer

Personal information
- Full name: Santiago Massana Urgellés
- Date of birth: 5 July 1889
- Place of birth: Barcelona, Catalonia, Spain
- Date of death: Unknown
- Place of death: Catalonia, Spain
- Height: 1.85 m (6 ft 1 in)
- Position: Defender

Senior career*
Years	Team	Apps	(Gls)
1903–1904	Ibèric FC		
1904–1909	X Sporting Club		
1909–1915	Espanyol		
1915–1917	Barcelona		
1915–1916	Terrassa FC		
1916–1917	Universitary SC		
1917–1918	Espanyol		

International career
1910–1916	Catalonia	6	(0)
Medal record
Catalonia
Prince of Asturias Cup
Silver medal – second place	1915 Prince of Asturias Cup	Team
- * Club domestic league appearances and goals

Santiago Massana Urgellés (5 June 1889 – Unknown), nicknamed Tiago, was a Spanish footballer who played as a defender. He was best known for his height, which he imposed on his opponents. His brother, Alfredo Massana, was also a footballer.

== Club career ==
Born in Barcelona, he joined the first team of Ibèric FC during the 1903-04 season, forming a great defensive partnership with the club's goalkeeper, Pedro Gibert, who also were teammates at X Sporting Club and Club Español de Fútbol. For the form, they played a pivotal role in the club's three back-to-back Catalan championships between 1906 and 1908, the latter two with the added help of his younger brother, Alfredo. In 1909, the club was effectively relaunched as the Club Deportivo Español, the name which still stands today.

Easily identifiable on the pitch due to height, Tiago was a tough and forceful defender, dwarfing his rivals and he also enjoyed a strong shot that he often used to clear the balls from his area, but in a match against Español de Madrid, he broke a leg, which endangered his football life, needing more than a year to recover. After 5 season with Espanyol, winning two Catalan Championships in 1911-12 and 1914–15, he signed for FC Barcelona in the 1915-16 season (his brother Alfredo had been in Barcelona since 1912), with whom he won that season's Catalan Championship. He and his brother left Barcelona at the end of that season to play with Terrassa FC for the 1916-17 season, but then, while Alfredo returned to Espanyol, he joined Universitary SC in 1917, where he played alongside former Espanyol teammate Turró, and at the end of the season both he and Turró returned to Espanyol in 1918, for whom they both played until retiring in 1922.

In 1922 he left Barcelona for the Amazon basin, where he bought an island in the state of Pará and settled there.

== International career ==
Like many other FC Barcelona players of that time, he played several matches for the Catalan national team between 1912 and 1916. In May 1915, he was a member of the team that participated in the first edition of the Prince of Asturias Cup in 1915, an inter-regional competition organized by the RFEF.

== Legacy ==
Llucià Oslé made a sculptural reproduction in bronze of Tiago, called "El Campió" which was housed in the Olympic Stadium for the 1929 Barcelona International Exposition, as part of a pair of sports-themed pieces.

== Honours ==
=== Club ===
X Sporting Club

- Catalan Championships:
  - Winners (3) 1905-06, 1906–07 and 1907–08

Espanyol

- Catalan Championships:
  - Winners (2) 1911-12 and 1914–15

Barcelona

- Catalan Championships:
  - Winners (1) 1915-16

=== International ===
Catalonia

- Prince of Asturias Cup:
  - Runner-up (1): 1915
