= Ángel Ponz =

Spanish footballer

Personal information
- Full name: Ángel Ponz Junyent
- Date of birth: 1883
- Place of birth: Barcelona, Catalonia, Spain
- Date of death: 20 August 1936 (aged 52–53)
- Position: Forward

Senior career*
Years	Team	Apps	(Gls)
1900–1906	Club Español	2	(1)
1906–1909	X Sporting Club		
1909–1912	Espanyol		
- * Club domestic league appearances and goals

Ángel Ponz Junyent (1883 – 20 August 1936) was a Spanish footballer who played as a forward for Club Español (now known as RCD Espanyol).

Although little has been recorded of his life, he was one of the most important footballers in the amateur beginnings of RCD Espanyol, being among the founding members of the club in 1900, and then serving the club as a forward, winning the 1902–03 Copa Macaya, which was the club's first-ever official title, as well as netting the club's only goal at the 1902 Copa de la Coronación (the forerunner for the Copa del Rey). He spent his entire 12-year career at Espanyol, sept for the three years in which the club had to cease its activities (1906–09), being one of the first great figures of the club.

== Playing career ==
Born in Barcelona, Ponz was one of the founding members of Club Español de Fútbol in 1900. He then becomes one of the first footballers of the newly formed Club Español, playing as a forward and standing out for his great speed. Together with José María Soler, he was part of the Español side that participated in the 1902 Copa de la Coronación (the forerunner for the Copa del Rey), in which he netted the first goal of the competition, thus going down in history as the goalscorer of the very first (unofficial) goal in the history of the Copa del Rey. However, Club Español lost the match 5–1 to Club Vizcaya (a combination of players from Athletic Club and Bilbao FC). He was also the first footballer to score a goal in a Derbi barceloní between RCD Espanyol and FC Barcelona.

Together with Joaquim Escardó, Ángel Rodríguez, and Gustavo Green, he was part of the team that won the 1902–03 Copa Macaya, the club's first-ever piece of silverware. Ponz then helped Español win the first edition of the Campionat de Catalunya in 1903–04. He remained loyal to the club until 1905, when Español had to suspend its activities due to a lack of players since most of them were university students who enrolled to study at universities outside Catalonia in the 1905–06 academic year. Most of the remaining players, including him and goalkeeper Pedro Gibert, joined X Sporting Club. Together with Pedro Gibert, the Massana brothers (Santiago and Alfredo) and José Irízar, he helped X win the Campionat de Catalunya three times in a row between 1906 and 1908. On 13 May 1906, Ponz was among the players who covered the losses of FC Barcelona in a friendly against Madrid FC and ended up scoring two goals in a 5–2 win.

In 1909, Espanyol was effectively relaunched as the Club Deportivo Español, the name which still stands today. Ponz played with Espanyol for three more years, being a member of the great Espanyol side of the 1910s that had the likes of Paco Bru, Emilio Sampere and the Armet brothers (Francisco and Kinké), winning the Campionat de Catalunya for the second time in 1911–12. In his last season in the club, he often played alongside his younger brother Enrique Ponz.

== Managerial career ==
In 1904, in the absence of the technical director, Ponz and his teammate Gustavo Green were in charge of directing the training sessions, so he can also be considered one of the first coaches of Espanyol.

== Death ==
On 20 August 1936, Ponz was killed in the Spanish Civil War.

== Honours ==
RCD Espanyol

- Copa Macaya:
  - Winners (1) 1902–03
- Catalan Championships:
  - Winners (2) 1903–04, 1911–12

X Sporting Club

- Catalan Championships:
  - Winners (3) 1905–06, 1906–07 and 1907–08
