= X Sporting Club =

Football club in Spain active between 1904 and 1909

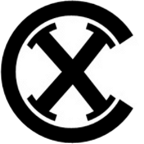
- Nickname: Los incógnitos (the incognitos)
- Short name: X Sporting Club
- Founded: March 1902
- Dissolved: 27 September 1908
- Ground: Campo de la Marina
- League: Catalan championship
Home colours	Away colours	Third colours

The X Sporting Club, officially founded as Football Club X, was a football team based in Barcelona, Catalonia, Spain, which existed during the years 1902 and 1908. They won the Catalan championship three times in a row between 1905 and 1908. X Sporting Club is best remembered for its role in the founding of RCD Espanyol in 1909.

== History ==
Established in March 1902 under the name of Football Club X, and in 1903 it occupied the football field of the newly defunct Irish FC at the Nuevo Velódromo de Barcelona in Carrer Aragó.

As one of the oldest clubs in Catalonia, X Sporting Club was a member of the second inter-club competition held in the territory (after the Copa Macaya), the Copa Barcelona, although they withdrew from it presumably due to its still amateur preparation compared to other more established clubs. which came to win three times before disappearing in 1908 to form, together with the Spanish Jiu-Jitsu Club, the current Real Club Deportivo Espanyol.

== X dominance ==
In 1906 Club Español de Football (now RCD Espanyol) had to suspend its activities due to a lack of players, since most of them were university students who enrolled to study at universities outside Catalonia. X Sporting Club took advantage of this as most of the remaining Español players joined them, which meant a big leap in quality for the club, and as a result, the X won the Catalan championship three times in a row between 1905 and 1908, beating the likes of FC Internacional, FC Barcelona and Català FC. This historic side had the likes of Emilio Sampere, Pedro Gibert, Ángel Ponz, the Massana brothers (Santiago and Alfredo), José Irízar, and José Berdié. Some victories were controversial, especially the last season, where the Catalan Federation, led by X director Isidre Lloret, was accused of favoritism towards his team. As regional champion, the X earned the opportunity to participate in the Copa del Rey, but declined its participation for three consecutive years.

In 1908 they settled on a new ground, the Campo de la Marina. The team's kit was a white shirt with an X on the chest and sometimes a black one as well.

== Decline and collapse ==
It was not until 1909 that X and Español were restructured again. This period, from 1906 to 1909, when Español ceased its activities, is now considered an "impasse" (Note: FC Internacional suffered this same fate, when it had to suspend its activities after the 1905-06 academic year, resuming them in 1910), and "The Incognitos", as the team was known, was nothing but a continuation. In 1909 when several of the former university students returned to Barcelona, with the idea of refounding Club Español de Football, they contacted former members, most of whom were at X, and others in the Spanish Jiu-Jitsu Club. On 27 December 1908, after a meeting among all those involved, the merger of both entities took place, leading to the establishment of Club Deportiu Espanyol, which adopted the corporate structure of the X Sporting Club (which ceased to exist) as well as that club's colours of blue and white. This club was granted patronage by King Alfonso XIII and subsequently became known as the Real Club Deportivo Español, or RCD Espanyol.

== Honours ==
- Catalan championship
  - Champions (3): 1905–06, 1906–07, 1907–08
