= Pedro Gibert (footballer) =

Spanish footballer

Personal information
- Full name: Pedro Gibert Requesens
- Date of birth: 15 February 1888
- Place of birth: La Pobla de Montornès, Catalonia, Spain
- Date of death: 9 October 1966 (aged 78)
- Place of death: Barcelona, Spain
- Position: Goalkeeper

Senior career*
| Years | Team | Apps | (Gls) |
| 1903–1904 | Ibèric FC | | |
| 1904 | Club Español de Fútbol | | |
| 1904–1909 | X Sporting Club | | |
| 1909–1916 | Espanyol | | |

International career
| 1910–1916 | Catalonia | 5 | (0) |
Medal record
Catalonia
Prince of Asturias Cup
| Gold medal – first place | 1916 Prince of Asturias Cup | Team |
- * Club domestic league appearances and goals

Pedro Gibert Requesens (15 February 1888 – 9 October 1966) was a Spanish footballer who played as a goalkeeper. He was nicknamed "Grapes" because he allowed himself the luxury of blocking the ball with one hand. He was considered the best Catalan goalkeeper of his time and one of the first great idols of Espanyol. He was the idol of the great Ricardo Zamora.

== Club career ==
Born in Catalonia, he joined the first team of Ibèric FC during the 1903–04 season where he formed a great defensive partnership with Santiago Massana; they also were teammates at X Sporting Club and RCD Espanyol. In Ibèric, he stood out as an extraordinary goalkeeper, which earned him a move to Club Español de Fútbol in 1904. Just a few months later, the club folded due to financial reasons and most of the players, including him, joined X Sporting Club. He played a pivotal role in the club's three back-to-back Catalan championships between 1906 and 1908. In 1909, the club was effectively relaunched as the Club Deportivo Español, the name which still stands today. He was the very first goalkeeper that Espanyol had.

He played for Espanyol for nearly a decade, being a member of the great Espanyol side of the 1910s that had the likes of Bru, Sampere, Blanco and the Armet brothers (Francisco and Kinké), winning two more Catalan championships in 1911–12 and 1914–15, as well as reaching the 1915 Copa del Rey Final, which they lost to Athletic Bilbao, in a game where he conceded 5 goals, including a Pichichi hat-trick.

One day, in a decision of his own, he announced his retirement to the surprise of many. There was a bit of a stir, but Gibert said he had no reason to fear as he would be leaving an exceptional goalkeeper in his place, Ricardo Zamora, who played his first game in April 1916, in a match against Madrid FC.

== International career ==
Being a Espanyol, he was eligible to play for the Catalonia national team, and he was part of the team that won the 1916 Prince of Asturias Cup, an inter-regional competition organized by the RFEF. He started in both games against a Castile/Madrid XI which ended in a win and a draw, enough for Catalonia to lift their first-ever piece of silverware.

== Honours ==
=== Club ===
X Sporting Club

Catalan championship:

- Champions (3): 1905–06, 1906–07, 1907–08

Espanyol

Catalan championship:

- Champions (2): 1911–12, 1914–15

=== International ===
Catalonia

Prince of Asturias Cup:

- Champions (1): 1916
