= Catalonia Championship =

Catalan Football Championship
- Founded: 1901
- Folded: 1940
- Country: Spain
- Last champions: RCD Espanyol (9th title)
- Most championships: Barcelona (23 titles)

The Catalan football championship (Campionat de Catalunya) was a football competition in Catalonia and the first football league in Spain before La Liga was established in 1929.

In December 1900, Alfons Macaya, the president of Hispania AC, offered a trophy (the Copa Macaya) to be contested by several football teams from Spain. The league was played between 1901 and 1940 and was cancelled in Francoist Spain after the Spanish Civil War.

== History ==
=== Early history ===
In 1901, Hispania AC became the first Catalan champions after winning the inaugural Copa Macaya, the first football championship played on the Iberian Peninsula. The following season, 1901–02, saw FC Barcelona win the title, the club's very first piece of silverware. During the 1902–03 season, two rival competitions were organized with RCD Espanyol winning the Copa Macaya after beating Hispania 3–1 in a title-deciding play-off (as they had finished level on points), while FC Barcelona won the Copa Barcelona. After 1903 the championship was organized by the Football Associació de Catalunya and it became known as the Campionat de Catalunya, and they recognized the Macaya Cup as the first edition of the Campionat de Catalunya. The stand-out players of this Copa Macaya period were Joan Gamper, who was proclaimed the top scorer of the first two tournaments with 31 and 19 goals respectively, and Gustavo Green, who is considered to have been the first great star of Catalan football, winning all the three editions of the Copa Macaya with three different clubs (Hispania, Barça and Español). The winners of the Campionat de Catalunya also began to represent Catalonia in the Copa del Rey. By 1917 the league had turned professional and included a second division.

=== First dynasty ===
The first edition of the Campionat de Catalunya in 1903–04 was won by Club Espanyol (now RCD Espanyol), which at the time had Gustavo Green, and also with Ángel Ponz and José Maria Soler. The first dynasty of the Catalan championship came shortly after, when X Sporting Club won it three times in a row between 1906 and 1908. This historic X side had great national figures of that time such as Pedro Gibert, Emilio Sampere, the Massana brothers (Santiago and Alfredo), José Irízar and José Berdié, with the latter four going on to play for Barcelona. On the other hand, FC Internacional achieved three successive runner-up finishes between 1904 and 1906, and interestingly, they lost the title to a different opponent each time: Club Español, FC Barcelona and X Sporting Club respectively. This FCI team had the likes of Paco Bru, Charles Wallace and Enrique Peris, all of which went on to join Barcelona. Naturally, all of these great players joining Barcelona meant a big leap in quality for the club, and as a result, at the turn of the first decade, Barcelona was enjoying its first great team. As well as the aforementioned players, Barça also had the likes of Amechazurra, Romà Forns, Pepe Rodríguez and Carles Comamala, and this team managed to repeat X's feat of winning three championships in a row, doing it so between 1909 and 1911. Their streak came to an end when RCD Espanyol won their second championship in 1911–12, largely thanks to the goalscoring feats of their foreign players such as Frank Allack, captain Victor Gibson and the Wallace brothers, Charles and Percy.

=== Barcelona dominance ===
In the 1910s, FC Espanya, propelled by their infamous back line of Hermenegild Casellas and Eduardo Reguera, began to disrupt the monopoly of Barcelona and RCD Espanyol, winning the championship three times in 1912–13, 1913–14 and 1916–17. However, RCD Espanyol managed to form an even better defense whose solo architect was Ricardo Zamora, thus claiming the title in 1914–15 and 1917–18, winning the former after beating Barça 4–0 in the title-deciding play-off, with braces from Juan López and José Maria Tormo. The Catalan Championship then witnessed their third dynasty, which was with no doubt the greatest. At the turn of the second decade, Barça was enjoying its second golden age, which was the legendary team coached by Jack Greenwell, that also included Paulino Alcántara, Sagibarba, Félix Sesúmaga, Ricardo Zamora and Josep Samitier, and this side won 9 out of 10 titles between 1919 and 1928. The only team that managed to break their supremacy was CE Europa in the 1922–23 season, largely thanks to Estebán Pelaó, Manuel Cros and Antonio Alcázar, with the latter netting the only goal of the title-deciding play-off (they had finished tied on points) that gave CE Europa the trophy.

=== Decline and Collapse ===
In 1928 three Catalan clubs: FC Barcelona, RCD Espanyol and CE Europa, became founding members of La Liga and the Campionat de Catalunya gradually began to decline in importance during the Spanish Civil War. In the 1930s, the championship was won by either Barcelona or Espanyol, except in 1933-34 when CE Sabadell FC, surprised everyone by winning it against all odds. The last competition was held on 1939-40, and the Campionat de Catalunya ended in the same way it began, with an RCD Espanyol triumph.

== Historical classification ==
The historical classification of Catalonia Football Championship is a classification that compiles all the matches, results, points and goals of all the teams that participated in the Championship of Catalonia football since its inception in 1900 until its disappearance in 1940. The classification includes the results of the Copa Macaya, the Barcelona Cup and the championship of the Football Association of Catalonia, also considered official. The 1902–03 and 1912–13 seasons were contested with two clubs claiming championships. This classification has been done with the data collected through the archives of Los Deportes, Mundo Deportivo, La Vanguardia. Classification may contain errors due to the inaccuracy of the data published in those years,

Pos	Team	Seasons	Points	P	W	D	L	GF	GA	GD	1st	2nd	3rd	Debut	Last Appearance	BR
1	FC Barcelona	39	644	402	301	42	59	1356	386	970	23	7	7	1900–1901	1939–1940	1
2	RCD Espanyol	37	513	398	231	51	117	922	520	402	9	11	9	1900–1901	1939–1940	1
3	CE Sabadell FC	24	241	272	98	45	129	442	530	-88	1	3	3	1914–1915	1939–1940	1
4	FC Espanya	18	203	190	89	25	76	323	295	28	3	4	3	1907–1908	1927–1928	1
5	CE Europa	14	195	164	81	33	50	362	260	102	1	6	1	1919–1920	1937–1938	1
6	CF Badalona	16	122	175	50	22	103	255	431	-176	0	1	2	1912–1913 (2)	1939–1940	2
7	FC Internacional	14	121	136	51	19	66	212	235	-23	0	3	3	1902–1903 (1)	1921–1922	2
8	UE Sants	9	91	110	36	19	55	182	224	-42	0	1	1	1922–1923	1932–1933	2
9	University SC	10	85	95	36	13	46	167	191	-24	0	0	3	1901–1902	1916–1917	3
10	CE Júpiter	8	85	96	38	10	48	174	219	-45	0	1	2	1929–1930	1937–1938	2
11	FC Català	14	80	119	35	10	74	179	385	-206	0	1	2	1901–1902	1914–1915	2
12	Girona FC	6	61	68	25	12	31	106	107	-1	0	1	1	1933–1934	1939–1940	2
13	Hispània AC	4	52	34	25	2	7	109	30	79	1	2	1	1900–1901	1902–1903 (2)	1
14	Terrassa FC	5	50	66	20	10	36	98	165	-67	0	0	0	1924–1925	1928–1929	4
15	FC Palafrugell	3	33	42	12	9	21	54	100	-46	0	0	1	1931–1932	1933–1934	3
16	EC Granollers	4	32	48	13	6	29	72	128	-56	0	0	0	1933–1934	1939–1940	4
17	X Sporting Club	5	31	40	15	1	24	39	65	-26	3	0	0	1903–1904	1907–1908	1
18	FC Martinenc	5	28	66	10	8	48	83	217	-134	0	0	0	1923–1924	1932–1933	6
19	FC Atlètic de Sabadell	4	27	42	12	3	27	38	93	-55	0	0	0	1915–1916	1918–1919	4
20	L'Avenç de l'Sport	6	26	50	10	6	34	60	107	-47	0	1	0	1912–1913 (2)	1922–1923	2
21	Salut SC	2	17	30	8	1	21	46	98	-52	0	0	0	1902–1903 (2)	1903–1904	5
22	Joventut FC	1	11	16	5	1	10	22	57	-35	0	0	0	1903–1904	1903–1904	6
23	Irish FC	1	10	14	4	2	8	25	24	1	0	0	0	1902–1903 (2)	1902–1903 (2)	5
24	FC Sant Gervasi	1	8	16	3	2	11	12	95	-83	0	0	0	1903–1904	1903–1904	7
25	Real Club de Polo de Barcelona	1	7	10	3	1	6	9	23	-14	0	0	0	1912–1913 (1)	1912–1913 (1)	4
26	Ibèria SC	1	7	14	3	1	10	10	25	-15	0	0	0	1902–1903 (2)	1902–1903 (2)	7
27	Club T.B.H.	1	6	8	3	0	5	12	13	-1	0	0	0	1914–1915	1914–1915	7
28	Casual SC	1	6	10	3	0	7	11	25	-14	0	0	0	1912–1913 (1)	1912–1913 (1)	5
29	FC Barcelona C	1	5	4	2	1	1	8	5	3	0	0	1	1912–1913 (2)	1912–1913 (2)	3
30	FC Numància	3	5	27	2	1	24	17	100	-83	0	0	0	1911–1912	1913–1914	5
31	FC Barcelona B	1	4	4	2	0	2	9	8	1	0	0	0	1912–1913 (2)	1912–1913 (2)	4
32	Star FC	1	4	12	2	0	10	1	30	-29	0	0	0	1909–1910	1909–1910	6
33	AUF Tarragona	1	4	8	2	0	6	0	30	-30	0	0	0	1900–1901	1900–1901	4
34	FC Central	1	2	12	1	0	11	5	40	-35	0	0	0	1909–1910	1909–1910	7
35	Club Franco-Espanyol	1	2	8	1	0	7	0	54	-54	0	0	0	1900–1901	1900–1901	5
36	Ibèric FC	1	2	16	0	2	14	4	70	-66	0	0	0	1903–1904	1903–1904	9

Active Club
Club deceased

== Champions ==
Season	Champions (titles)	Runners-up	Third place	Top scorer(s)	
Season	Champions (titles)	Runners-up	Third place	Player(s) (Country)	Goals
1900–01	Hispania AC (1)	FC Barcelona	Club Espanyol (Note: Espanyol withdrew after the fourth game.)	Joan Gamper (Barcelona)	31
1901–02	FC Barcelona (1)	Hispania AC	Club Espanyol	Joan Gamper (Barcelona)	19
1902–03	Club Espanyol (1)	Hispania AC	FC Internacional	Gustavo Green (Espanyol)	7
1902–03	FC Barcelona (2)	Club Espanyol	Hispania AC	Joan Gamper (Barcelona)	21
1903–04	Club Espanyol (2)	FC Internacional	Català FC	Carles Comamala (Barcelona)	14
1904–05	FC Barcelona (3)	FC Internacional	Club Espanyol	Romà Forns (Barcelona)	4
1905–06	X Sporting Club (1)	FC Internacional	FC Barcelona	Romà Forns (Barcelona); José Quirante (Barcelona); Juan Bargunyó (Barcelona); Virgilio Da Costa (Barcelona); Guillermo Galiardo (X Sporting Club)	3
1906–07	X Sporting Club (2)	FC Barcelona	Català FC	Emilio Sampere (X Sporting Club)	4
1907–08	X Sporting Club (3)	FC Barcelona	FC Espanya	Carles Comamala (Barcelona); Charles Wallace (Barcelona)	3
1908–09	FC Barcelona (4)	FC Espanya	CD Espanyol	Charles Wallace (Barcelona)	7
1909–10	FC Barcelona (5)	CD Espanyol	Universitary SC	Carles Comamala (Barcelona)	23
1910–11	FC Barcelona (6)	Català SC	Universitary SC	George Pattullo (Barcelona)	12
1911–12	Club Espanyol (3)	FC Espanya	FC Barcelona	Pepe Rodríguez (Barcelona)	15
1912–13	FC Espanya (1)	Club Espanyol	Universitary SC	Kinké (Universitary)	6
1912–13	FC Barcelona (7)	FC Barcelona C	Avenç FC	Apolinario Rodríguez	7
1913–14	FC Espanya (2)	FC Internacional	RCD Espanyol	Gabriel Bau (FC Espanya)	5
1914–15	RCD Espanyol (4)	FC Barcelona	FC Espanya	José Maria Tormo (Espanyol)	7
1915–16	FC Barcelona (8)	FC Espanya	Sabadell FC	Paulino Alcántara (Barcelona)	23
1916–17	FC Espanya (3)	RCD Espanyol	Sabadell FC	Agustín Cruella Tena (FC Espanya)	11
1917–18	RCD Espanyol (5)	FC Espanya	FC Barcelona	Clemente Gràcia (Espanyol)	9
1918–19	FC Barcelona (9)	RCD Espanyol	FC Espanya	Paulino Alcántara (Barcelona); Vicente Martínez (Barcelona)	9
1919–20	FC Barcelona (10)	Sabadell FC	RCD Espanyol	Paulino Alcántara (Barcelona)	14
1920–21	FC Barcelona (11)	CE Europa	RCD Espanyol	Enrique Alegre (Europa)	14
1921–22	FC Barcelona (12)	CE Europa	Avenç	Paulino Alcántara (Barcelona); Clemente Gràcia (Barcelona)	19
1922–23	CE Europa (1)	FC Barcelona	Sabadell FC	Paulino Alcántara (Barcelona); Manuel Cros (Europa); José Julià (Europa)	7
1923–24	FC Barcelona (13)	CE Europa	RCD Espanyol	Josep Samitier (Barcelona)	14
1924–25	FC Barcelona (14)	RCD Espanyol	UE Sants	Josep Samitier (Barcelona); José Luis Zabala (Espanyol)	10
1925–26	FC Barcelona (15)	UE Sants	Sabadell FC	Josep Sastre (FC Gràcia)	13
1926–27	FC Barcelona (16)	CE Europa	RCD Espanyol	Josep Samitier (Barcelona)	18
1927–28	FC Barcelona (17)	CE Europa	RCD Espanyol	Manuel Cros (Europa)	21
1928–29	RCD Espanyol (6)	CE Europa	FC Barcelona	Manuel Cros (Europa)	12
1929–30	FC Barcelona (18)	RCD Espanyol	CE Europa	Josep Forgas (CF Badalona)	9
1930–31	FC Barcelona (19)	Sabadell FC	CF Badalona	Edelmiro Lorenzo (Espanyol)	9
1931–32	FC Barcelona (20)	RCD Espanyol	CE Júpiter	Josep Samitier (Barcelona)	13
1932–33	RCD Espanyol (7)	FC Barcelona	Palafrugell	José Garreta (Espanyol)	19
1933–34	Sabadell FC (1)	RCD Espanyol	FC Barcelona	Miguel Gual (Sabadell)	18
1934–35	FC Barcelona (21)	Sabadell FC	CE Júpiter	Josep Escolà (Barcelona)	13
1935–36	FC Barcelona (22)	CF Badalona	Sabadell FC	Josep Escolà (Barcelona)	19
1936–37	RCD Espanyol (8)	FC Barcelona	Girona FC	Miguel Gual (Barcelona)	9
1937–38	FC Barcelona (23)	CE Júpiter	CF Badalona	Jaime Rigual (Barcelona)	15
1939–40	RCD Espanyol (9)	Girona FC	FC Barcelona	Martínez Català (Espanyol)	14

== Titles by Team ==
Rank	Country	No	Editions
1	FC Barcelona	23	1901–02, 1902–03, 1904–05, 1908–09, 1909–10, 1910–11, 1912–13, 1915–16, 1918–19, 1919–20, 1920–21, 1921–22, 1923–24, 1924–25, 1925–26, 1926–27, 1927–28, 1929–30, 1930–31, 1931–32, 1933–34, 1935–36, and 1937–38.
2	Club Espanyol / RCD Espanyol / CD Espanyol	9	1902–03, 1903–04, 1911–12, 1914–15, 1917–18, 1928–29, 1932–33, 1936–37, and 1939–40.
3	X Sporting Club	3	1905–06, 1906–07, and 1907–08
3	FC Espanya de Barcelona	3	1912–13, 1913–14, and 1916–17
5	Hispania AC	1	1900–01
5	CE Europa	1	1922–23
5	CE Sabadell FC	1	1933–34

== See also ==
- Copa Macaya
- Copa Catalunya
- Supercopa de Catalunya
- Catalonia national football team
