= 1902–03 FC Barcelona season =

4th season in existence of FC Barcelona

FC Barcelona
1902–03 season
- President: Paul Haas
- Copa Barcelona: First
Home colours	Away colours

The 1902–03 season was the fourth season for FC Barcelona.

== Events ==
Barcelona decides to withdraw from the Copa Macaya after losing two points for fielding an ineligible player in the tournament's first match. The club breaks relations with the Gymnastics Federation and decides to organize a tournament of their own: La Copa Barcelona. FC Barcelona wins this trophy.

Paul Haas replaced Bartomeu Terradas as president on 5 September 1902.

== Squad ==
Note: Flags indicate national team as defined under FIFA eligibility rules; some limited exceptions apply. Players may hold more than one non-FIFA nationality.

No.	Pos.	Nation	Player
—	GK	ESP	Vicente Reig
—	GK	ESP	Luis Puelles
—	DF	ESP	Arthur Witty
—	DF	ENG	Charles Heresford
—	DF	ESP	Josep Quirante
—	MF	SUI	George Meyer
—	MF	ESP	Josep Vidal
—	MF	ESP	Bartomeu Terradas
—	MF	ESP	Alfonso Almasqué
—	MF	ESP	Josep Llobet

No.	Pos.	Nation	Player
—	FW	ESP	Luis de Ossó
—	FW	ESP	Bernardo Lassaletta
—	FW	SUI	Hans Gamper
—	FW	GER	Udo Steinberg
—	FW	ENG	Stanley Harris
—	FW	SUI	Emil Gass
—	FW	ESP	John Parsons
—	FW	ESP	Costal
—	FW	SUI	Emil Gaissert

== Matches ==
Friendly

26 October 1902	FC Barcelona	12 – 0	Ibèria SC	Barcelona
				Stadium: Camp de la carretera d’Horta

2 November 1902	FC Barcelona	0 – 1	Irish FC	Barcelona
				Stadium: Camp de la carretera d’Horta; Referee: Marcelo Sanz

9 November 1902	Català FC	1 – 3	FC Barcelona	Barcelona
			Meyer; Leask; Ossó	Stadium: Velódromo de la Bonanova; Referee: Mendez

16 November 1902	FC Barcelona	2 – 1	Club Universitari	Barcelona
	Steinberg; Lassaleta			Stadium: Camp de la carretera d’Horta; Referee: George Meyer

23 November 1902	FC Barcelona	5 – 2	Club Universitari	Barcelona
	Ossó; Steinberg; Lassaletta			Stadium: Camp de la carretera d’Horta; Referee: Arthur Leask

21 December 1902	Catalònia FC	0 – 5	FC Barcelona	Barcelona
			Gamper; Leask; Ossó	Stadium: Catalonia; Referee: Garcia

28 December 1902	FC Barcelona	1 – 0	X Sporting Club	Barcelona
	Lassaletta			Stadium: Camp de la carretera d’Horta; Referee: Castells

4 January 1903	Catalònia FC	0 – 16	FC Barcelona	Barcelona
			Gamper; Steinberg; Ossó; Lassaletta	Stadium: Catalonia; Referee: Torrente

18 January 1903	FC Barcelona	9 – 1	Irish FC	Barcelona
	Steinberg; Lassaletta; Ossó			Stadium: Camp de la carretera d’Horta; Referee: Pujol

10 March 1903	FC Barcelona	1 – 0	Galliope (Note: Name of the English ship at the port of Barcelona)	Barcelona
	Lassaletta			Stadium: Camp de la carretera d’Horta; Referee: Park

28 May 1903	Salut SC	3 – 2	FC Barcelona	Barcelona
			Jorro; Meyer	Stadium: Salut; Referee: Garcia

27 July 1903	Mataroni	2 – 8	FC Barcelona	Barcelona
			Ossó; Jorro; Rene	Stadium: Mataro; Referee: Mensa

Copa Macaya

30 November 1902 Round 1	Hispania AC	0 – 2 (Note: Barcelona pulled the competition)	FC Barcelona	Barcelona
			Steinberg; Lassaletta	Stadium: Camp del carrer Muntaner; Referee: Degollada

Copa Barcelona

11 January 1903 Round 1	FC Barcelona	7 – 0	Ibèria SC	Barcelona
	Gamper; Ossó; Lassaletta			Stadium: Camp de la carretera d'Horta; Referee: Eduardo Alesson

25 January 1903 Round 3	FC Barcelona	2 – 1	Català FC	Barcelona
	Gamper		Goal	Stadium: Camp de la carretera d'Horta; Referee: Eduardo Alesson

1 February 1903 Round 4	FC Barcelona	13 – 0 (Note: Not counted because X Sporting Club withdrew from the competition.)	X Sporting Club	Barcelona
	Gamper; Ossó; Lassaletta			Stadium: Camp de la carretera d'Horta; Referee: Cusí

8 February 1903 Round 6	FC Barcelona	6 – 0	FC Internacional	Barcelona
	Gamper; Ossó; Harris			Stadium: Camp de la carretera d'Horta

22 February 1903 Round 8	FC Barcelona	Not played	Salut SC	Barcelona
				Stadium: Camp de la carretera d'Horta

1 March 1903 Round 9	FC Barcelona	6 – 1	Hispania AC	Barcelona
	Steinberg; Lassaletta; Meyer; Ossó		Goal	Stadium: Camp de la carretera d'Horta; Referee: Oliveras

8 March 1903 Round 10	FC Barcelona	2 – 2	Club Español	Barcelona
15:30	Gamper; Steinberg		Goal	Stadium: Camp de la carretera d'Horta; Attendance: 4.000; Referee: John Hamilton

19 March 1903 Round 12	Irish FC	1 – 4	FC Barcelona	Barcelona
			Gamper; Meyer; Gass	Referee: Acha

22 March 1903 Round 13	Català FC	2 – 4	FC Barcelona	Barcelona
	Goal		Gamper; Steinberg; Lassaletta	Stadium: Velódromo de la Bonanova; Referee: Mascaró

29 March 1903 Round 15	FC Internacional	Not played	FC Barcelona	Barcelona

5 April 1903 Round 16	Ibèria SC	0 – 8	FC Barcelona	Barcelona
			Steinberg; Gamper; Parsons	Referee: Mascaró

12 April 1903 Round 17	Salut SC	Not played	FC Barcelona	Barcelona

13 April 1903 Round 2	FC Barcelona	3 – 1	Irish FC	Barcelona
	Ossó; Almasqué		Goal	Stadium: Camp de la carretera d'Horta; Referee: José Barroso

19 April 1903 Round 18	Hispania AC	0 – 1	FC Barcelona	Barcelona
			Gamper	Stadium: Camp del carrer Muntaner; Referee: Ricardo Cabot

26 April 1903 Round 19	Club Español	2 – 2	FC Barcelona	Barcelona
	García		Gamper; Harris	Stadium: Camp de l'Hospital Clínic; Referee: John Hamilton
