= 1901–02 FC Barcelona season =

3rd season in existence of FC Barcelona

FC Barcelona
1901–02 season
- President: Bartomeu Terradas
- Copa de la Coronación: Runner-up
- Copa Macaya: First
Home colours	Away colours

The 1901–02 season was the third season for FC Barcelona.

== Events ==
The first game of the season was a friendly against Hispania AC which ended in a 1–0 victory thanks to a goal from Joan Gamper. The following game was the first at camp de la Carretera d'Horta, and Gamper contributed decisively once again with a hat-trick to help his side to a 4–0 win over the crew of Calliope.

A few months later, Barça won the first official piece of silverware, the 1901–02 Copa Macaya. In the eight games played in the tournament, Barça only conceded two goals, in a 2–4 win over Hispania on 6 January 1902, and scored a resounding 60 goals, 15 of which came on the final matchday in a 15–0 victory over Català SC on 23 March 1902, with Udo Steinberg netting 6 goals, and Joan Gamper and Arthur Leask clutching a hat-trick each.

Coinciding with the festivities of the coronation of King Alfonso XIII, the president of the recently established Madrid FC, the Catalan Juan Padrós, had the idea of organizing the first national championship, the Copa de la Coronación. It was contested in Madrid, and five teams participated: Barça, Club Español (now RCD Espanyol), Madrid FC (now Real Madrid), New Club and Club Vizcaya. The competition featured the first recorded game between Barcelona and Madrid FC on 13 May 1902, with the Blaugrana emerging as 3–1 winners, courtesy of goals from Steinberg and Gamper. Barça reached the final of the championship, where they were defeated by Bizcaya 2–1.

== Squad ==
Note: Flags indicate national team as defined under FIFA eligibility rules; some limited exceptions apply. Players may hold more than one non-FIFA nationality.

No.	Pos.	Nation	Player
—	GK	ESP	Vicente Reig
—	GK	ESP	Luis Puelles
—	GK	ENG	Samuel Morris
—	DF	ESP	Arthur Witty
—	DF	SUI	George Meyer
—	DF	ENG	A. J. Smart
—	DF	ESP	Artury
—	MF	SUI	Paul Widerkehr
—	MF	ESP	Miguel Valdés
—	MF	GER	Otto Maier
—	MF	ESP	Bartomeu Terradas
—	MF	ESP	Josep Marín
—	MF	ESP	Josep Llobet

No.	Pos.	Nation	Player
—	MF	ENG	James Morris
—	FW	ENG	Henry Morris
—	FW	ENG	Arthur Leask
—	FW	ESP	Josep Quirante
—	FW	ESP	Alfonso Albéniz
—	FW	ESP	Luis de Ossó
—	FW	ESP	Bernardo Lassaletta
—	FW	ESP	John Parsons
—	FW	ESP	Alfonso Almasqué
—	FW	ESP	Gustavo Green
—	FW	ESP	Joaquín García
—	FW	SUI	Hans Gamper
—	FW	GER	Udo Steinberg

== Matches ==
Friendly

29 September 1901	FC Barcelona	1 – 0	Hispania AC	Barcelona
	Gamper			Stadium: Parc de la Ciutadella; Referee: Rodriguez

23 November 1901	FC Barcelona	4 – 0	Calliope	Barcelona
	Gamper; Conarre			Stadium: Camp de la carretera d'Horta; Referee: John Hamilton

8 December 1901	FC Barcelona	4 – 1	Català FC	Barcelona
	Gamper; Chown			Stadium: Camp de la carretera d'Horta; Referee: Rodriguez

29 December 1901	Català FC	0 – 8	FC Barcelona	Barcelona
			Gamper; Català; Garcia; J. Parsons	Stadium: Velódromo de la Bonanova; Referee: Escriche

Medal of the Spanish Gymnastics Federation

2 March 1902	Irish FC	2 – 7	FC Barcelona	Barcelona
			Lassaleta; Eckes; Ossó; Harris	Stadium: Nou Velòdrom; Referee: George Meyer

16 March 1902	FC Barcelona	12 – 0	FC Internacional	Barcelona
	Ossó; Lassaleta; Harris; Eckes; Llobet			Stadium: Camp de la carretera d'Horta; Referee: Ángel Ponz

19 March 1902	Espanyol	0 – 2	FC Barcelona	Barcelona
			Lassaleta; Noble	Referee: E. Garcia

23 March 1902	FC Barcelona	5 – 3	Català FC	Barcelona
	Harris; Lassaleta; Eckes			Referee: J. Meyer

31 March 1902	Catalònia FC	0 – 4	FC Barcelona	Barcelona
			Lassaleta; Llomet	Referee: Alcala del Olmo

6 April 1902	FC Barcelona	6 – 0	Irish FC	Barcelona
	Lassaleta; Ossó			Referee: Mascara

13 April 1902	FC Barcelona	4 – 0^{1}	Ibèria SC	Barcelona
	Noble; Lassaleta; Albéniz			Referee: Riera

13 April 1902	FC Internacional	0 – 3^{2}	FC Barcelona	Barcelona
			Ossó; Llobeta; Vidal	Referee: (1º half) Gispert (2º half) Llofriu

20 April 1902	FC Barcelona	7 – 0	Club Espanyol	Barcelona
	Lassaleta; Ossó; Green			Referee: Gegollada

27 April 1902	Català FC	1 – 3	FC Barcelona	Barcelona
			Ossó; Lassaleta	Referee: Miguel Sanmartin

4 May 1902	Ibèria SC	1 – 2	FC Barcelona	Barcelona
			Ossó	Referee: A. Galiardo

8 May 1902	FC Barcelona	10 – 0	Catalònia FC	Barcelona
	Lassaleta; Noble; Albéniz; Ossó			Stadium: Camp de la carretera d'Horta; Referee: J. Mascaro

Copa Macaya

22 December 1901 Round 2	FC Barcelona	7 – 0	Club Español	Barcelona
	Steinberg; Gamper; García			Stadium: Camp de la carretera d'Horta; Referee: Samuel Morris

1 January 1902 Round 4	FC Barcelona	8 – 0	Club Universitari	Barcelona
	Gamper; Steinberg; García			Stadium: Camp de la carretera d'Horta; Referee: Carril

6 January 1902 Round 5	Hispania AC	2 – 4	FC Barcelona	Barcelona
	J. Morris o.g.		Albéniz; Gamper; J. Parsons	Stadium: Camp del carrer Muntaner; Attendance: 3.000; Referee: Ball

19 January 1902 Round 7	Club Español	0 – 4	FC Barcelona	Barcelona
			Gamper; García; Steinberg	Stadium: Camp de las Arenas; Referee: A J. Smart

2 February 1902 Round 9	Club Universitari	0 – 9	FC Barcelona	Barcelona
			Gamper; Steinberg; Ossó; Vinyas (o.g.)	Stadium: Camp de l'Hotel Casanovas; Referee: Quintana

16 February 1902 Round 10	FC Barcelona	12 – 0	Català FC	Barcelona
	Widerkehr; Gamper; Steinberg; Albéniz o.g.			Stadium: Camp de la carretera d'Horta; Referee: King

9 March 1902 Round 12	FC Barcelona	1 – 0	Hispania AC	Barcelona
15:30	Steinberg			Stadium: Camp de la carretera d'Horta; Attendance: 5.500; Referee: Park

23 March 1902 Round 14	Català FC	0 – 15	FC Barcelona	Barcelona
			Steinberg; Gamper; Leask; J. Parsons; Quirante	Stadium: Velódromo de la Bonanova; Referee: Otto Gmelin

Copa de la Coronación

13 May 1902 Semifinals	Madrid FC	1 – 3	FC Barcelona	Madrid
11:00	Johnson	Cihefe bdfutbol	Steinberg; Gamper (-)	Stadium: Hipódromo de la Castellana; Attendance: 2.500; Referee: Arana (Bilbao)

15 May 1902 Final	Bizcaya	2 – 1	FC Barcelona	Hipódromo, Madrid
16:00	Astorquia 10'; Cazeaux 20'	RSSSF; CIHEFE bdfutbol	J. Parsons 75'	Referee: (Spain) Carlos Padrós (Madrid FC)

- 1 Eckes, played his last game for the club as a goalkeeper.
- 2 Second match for Barcelona on the same day.
