= Alfonso Almasqué =

Spanish footballer and journalist (1883–1960)

Personal information
- Full name: Alfonso Almasqué Domènech
- Birth name: Alfons Almasqué i Domènech
- Date of birth: 23 September 1883
- Place of birth: Sant Sadurní d'Anoia, Barcelona, Spain
- Date of death: 5 June 1960 (aged 76)
- Place of death: Miami, Florida, United States
- Position: Midfielder

Senior career*
| Years | Team | Apps | (Gls) |
| –1901 | Etica Zürich | | |
| 1901–1904 | FC Barcelona | 3 | (1) |
| 1904–1905 | Català FC | | |
| 1905–1909 | FC Barcelona | | |

International career
| 1903 | Barcelona | 1 | (0) |
| 1904 | Catalonia | 1 | (0) |
- * Club domestic league appearances and goals

Alfonso Almasqué Domènech (23 September 1883 – 5 June 1960) was a Spanish journalist and footballer who played as a midfielder for FC Barcelona. He is the older brother of Alberto Almasqué, who also played for Barcelona, and in doing so, they became the first Catalan brothers in the club's history. He later became a referee, officiating the 1909 Copa del Rey final.

== Early life and education ==
Alfonso Almasqué was born in the Alt Penedès municipality of Sant Sadurní d'Anoia on 23 September 1883, as the first of four children from the marriage of Alfonso Almasqué Irigoyen (1858–1897) and Rosa de Lima Domènech Sagristà (1864–1940). In 1912, he married Lilian Dunkley (1891–1943) in London, with whom he had two daughters, Carmen María (1910–1997), Lillian (1912–2003). He went on to marry a further two times, to Katheleen Drayson and Germaine Fleury, with whom he had one daughter each, Rosa (1914–1983) and Madeleine (1918–2001), respectively.

They lived their childhood and adolescence in Switzerland, where they completed their studies and also learned about football, joining the ranks of Etica (Ethics) club in the city of Zürich, where he also practiced other sports, such as tennis and skating. When Almasqué finished his studies in 1901, he and his younger brother returned to Barcelona, where Alberto continued his studies.

== Club career ==
When he returned to Barcelona in 1901, the Almasqué brothers joined the ranks of their hometown club, FC Barcelona, where they both became members of the club's reserve/second team, which was mainly made up of Catalans, featuring alongside the likes of Luis de Ossó, Alfonso Albéniz, and Luis Puelles. Almasqué made his official competitive debut for Barça in the 1901–02 Copa Macaya on 1 January, helping his side to an 8–0 thrashing of Club Universitari at Horta, where the surface was clay, which was common at the time. In doing so, he became the first-ever player from the Alt Penedès region to play for Barça's first team, but he went on to spend that season as a regular in the second team, with whom he won lesser tournaments organized by the Spanish Gymnastics Federation, such as the 1902 Medalla del Ayuntamiento. In June 1902, the journalists of the Spanish newspaper Los Deportes stated that he was "one of the most distinguished players in the second team, playing excellently as a defender, midfielder, and forward". Around this time, he went to Lyon to complete his studies, with the press noting that his "teammates await his return to take up the position of Vice Captain".

His younger brother Alberto made his official competitive debut for Barça in the 1902–03 Copa Macaya on 30 November, at the age of 13 years, 11 months and 6 days, thus becoming the youngest footballer to debut with the first team in any official competition; however, some historians and sources remain doubtful about the veracity of this, suggesting that Alfonso, who is five years older, could have been the one who played this match.

At the beginning of the 20th century, many families had several footballers in Barça's first team, such as the English Witty (Arthur and Ernest), Parsons (John and William), and the Saint Nobles (George and Royston), as well as the Filipinos Morris (Samuel, Enrique, and Miguel), but it was the Almasqués who went down in history as the first Catalan brothers of the entity. To distinguish them in the match chronicles, the Barcelona press dubbed them as Almasqué I (Alfonso) and Almasqué II (Alberto), which was common at the time. Between 1902 and 1909, the Almasqués played just 40 games with Barça's first team, but only four were competitive and official (two each), corresponding to the Copa Macaya, the Copa Barcelona, and the Catalan championship. Following the Copa Macaya in 1902, Almasqué I's second official match with Barça at the 1902–03 Copa Barcelona, scoring once in a 3–1 over Irish FC. Barcelona ended up winning both tournaments, and although his contribution to both of those titles was limited to a single match, he was nonetheless a part of the squad and thus a two-time title winner.

Almasqué then played for Català FC in the 1904–05 season and, again, occasionally, for Barcelona, playing a friendly match in both the 1905–06 and the 1908–09 seasons. The former occasion was Barça's first-ever match in the Basque Country, which ended in a resounding 1–10 loss to Athletic Bilbao at the Hippodrome of Lamiako on 15 April 1906, a humiliating result that was chronicled in Mundo Deportivo by Almasqué himself, who attributed this historic defeat to an "unprecedented misfortune". He also played one season with the Universitari Sport Club.

== International career ==
On 8 September 1903, Almasqué participated in a match between a white and a red team made up of the best players in Barcelona, which was held on the field of Salud SC on the occasion of the Health neighborhood festivities, helping the white side to a 4–3 win.

On 29 May 1904, Almasqué earned his only cap for the Catalan national team in a match against RCD Espanyol, the then Copa Macaya champions, which ended in a 1–4 loss.

== Later life ==
After retiring, Almasqué remained linked to the world of sport, but now through journalism, being one of the founders and editor of Mundo Deportivo in 1906, where he was already in charge of the football section in its inaugural editorial, writing several sports chronicles during the first years. Between 1908 and 1909, he experienced the peak of a hectic sporting life, as he combined journalism with the presidency of the Spanish Jiu-Jitsu Club, a club that would eventually lead to the refounding of RCD Espanyol in 1909, as well as the vice presidency of the Catalan Football Federation (1908–09), whose president Juli Marial had been his teammate at Barcelona, and even with his brief refereeing career, officiating the 1909 Copa del Rey final between Club Ciclista and Español de Madrid, which ended in a 3–1 victory to the former, partly because of a first-half penalty that Almasqué awarded to Club Ciclista.

Almasqué collaborated with the newspaper intermittently until 1936, since he was an advertising advisor and consultant for the Nestlé company, in which his brother was a director of its branches in Chile, Bolivia (1916–1920), and in Cuba (1921–1931), so Almasqué had to travel constantly, especially to South America, thus living abroad for many years. In the 1930s, he wrote again for Mundo Deportivo under the pseudonym of Alfonso de Fleury, where he commented on Sunday's matches with his own personal touch. When the Spanish Civil War broke out in 1936, Almasqué moved to Switzerland. He returned to writing for Mundo Deportivo occasionally between 1948 and 1950, publishing his last articles on the occasion of the 1950 FIFA World Cup in Brazil.

== Death ==
Almasqué died in Vevey on 5 June 1960, at the age of 76.

== Honours ==
Barcelona

- Copa Macaya:
  - Champions (1): 1901–02
- Copa Barcelona:
  - Champions (1): 1902–03
