= Pere Cabot =

Spanish footballer (1877–1907)

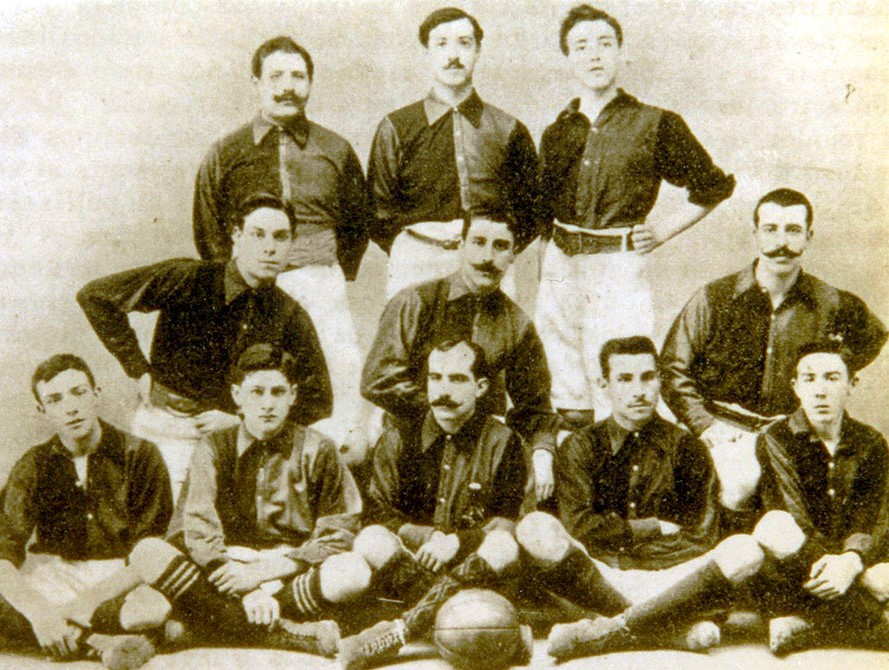
- Cabot (crouching, first from right) in 1902

Personal information
- Full name: Pere Cabot Roldós
- Birth name: Pere Cabot i Roldós
- Date of birth: 1877
- Place of birth: Cabrils, Spain
- Date of death: 3 September 1907 (aged 29–30)
- Place of death: Barcelona, Spain
- Positions: Defender; midfielder

Senior career*
Years	Team	Apps	(Gls)
1899–1902	FC Barcelona	27	(1)
- * Club domestic league appearances and goals

Pere Cabot Roldós (1877 – 28 August 1907) was a Spanish footballer who played as a defender for FC Barcelona at the turn of the century. He was one of the most important footballers in the amateur beginnings of FC Barcelona, being among the 12 founders of the club in 1899, and then playing for Barça for three years.

== Early life ==
Pere Cabot was born in the Maresme town of Cabrils in 1877, as the son of Josepha Roldós i Barnet and Francesch Cabot, a navy captain. His family owned a shipping company in the city of Barcelona. He married Montserrat Batlle i Aragagall, with whom he had a son, Jaume.

== Career ==
Cabot was one of the twelve men who attended the historic meeting held at the Gimnasio Solé on 29 November 1899, which saw the birth of Futbol Club Barcelona. For unclear reasons, however, he only made his debut for the club in its eighth match, a friendly against Team Roig on 24 May 1900, thus becoming the first-ever Maresmenc in the club's history. Between November 1901 and 1903, Cabot was a member of the club's board as a director, from which position he created the club's first statutes in 1902, which he registered in the register of associations on 18 November. Also in 1902, he was part of the committee appointed by Eugeni Bargés i Prat to organize the Concurso Pergamí, which had been created for the clubs founded in the 1901–02 season.

In total, Cabot scored one goal in 27 appearances for Barça, but only one came in an official competitive match, an 18–0 away victory over AUF Tarragona in the 1900–01 Copa Macaya on 17 March 1901. This happened because he preferred to play with the second team, which was mainly made up of Catalans, such as Alfonso Albéniz, Luis Puelles, and fellow club founders Luis de Ossó and Josep Llobet. With the club's second team, he won lesser tournaments organized by the Spanish Gymnastics Federation, such as the 1902 Medalla del Ayuntamiento.

In addition to football, Cabot was also a skilled pelota player and cyclist, and a member of the "Sports Photography Club". He was known for his good humor, his strong charges, and his ability to play with glasses.

== Death ==
Shortly after the birth of his son, Cabot died of typhus in Barcelona on 28 August 1907. The Spanish newspapers Mundo Deportivo and La Vanguardia only reported on his death on 5 September, indicating that the death had occurred on the 3rd of that month.
