= Manuel de Castellví =

Spanish footballer (1886–1950)

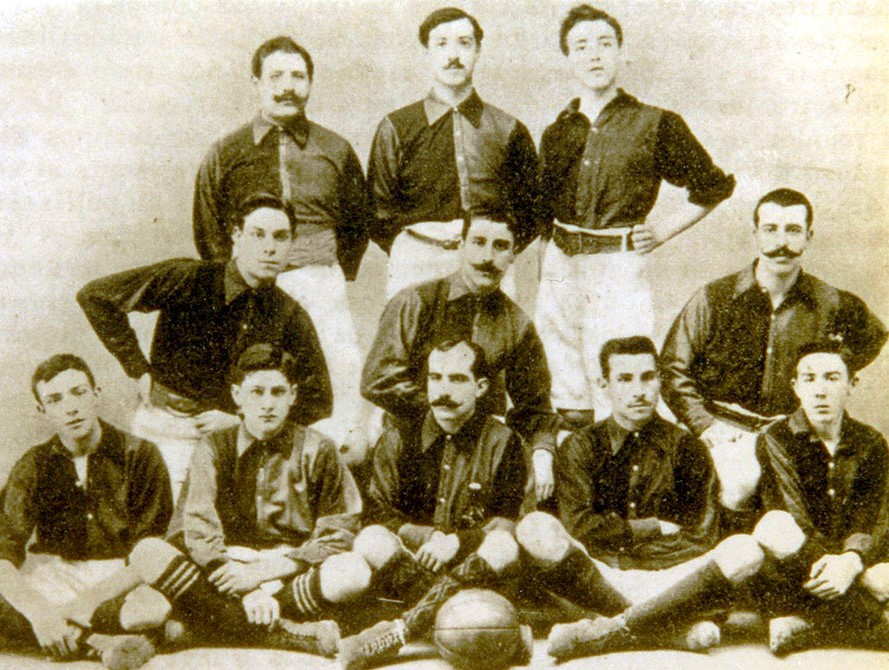
- Castellví (standing, first from left) in 1902

Personal information
- Full name: Manuel de Castellví y Feliú
- Date of birth: 1886
- Place of birth: Tarragona, Spain
- Date of death: 17 January 1950 (aged 63–64)
- Position: Defender

Senior career*
Years	Team	Apps	(Gls)
1900–1902	Barcelona		
1900–1903	Barcelona B		
- * Club domestic league appearances and goals

Manuel de Castellví y Feliú (1886 – 17 January 1950) was a Spanish footballer who played as a defender for Barcelona in the early 20th century.

== Playing career ==
Born in 1886 in Tarragona, Castellví began his football career in FC Barcelona, making his debut with the first team in a friendly match against Hispania AC on 18 November 1900, starting as a defender in front of nearly 4,000 spectators, but despite his tender age of just 14, he helped his team keep a clean-sheet in an eventual goalless draw.

In early 1901, the 15-year-old Castellví was listed as a member of the Barça team that participated in the first edition of the Copa Macaya, the first football competition played on the Iberian Peninsula; however, he failed to appear in a single match, probably because of his young age. He thus played mostly with the second team, which was mainly made up of Catalans, featuring alongside the likes of Alfonso Albéniz, Josep Llobet, and Luis de Ossó. He was a member of the Barça B team that won lesser tournaments organized by the Spanish Gymnastics Federation, such as the 1902 Medalla del Ayuntamiento between February and June 1902.

In total, Castellví played in 17 friendly matches for Barça's first team between 1900 and 1902, making his last appearance on 8 May 1902, aged 15–16.

== Later life and death ==
Castellví later became a knight of the Real Cuerpo de la Nobleza de Cataluña ("Royal Corps of Nobility of Catalonia"), which allowed him to marry María del Rosario Bosch-Labrús Reig (1894–1982), a Vizcondado de Bosch-Labrús. The couple had three children, Luis (1921–2001), who would later succeeded her mother as the new Vizconde de Bosch-Labrús, plus María and Manuel de Castellvi.

Castellví died on 17 January 1950, at the age of either 63 or 64.

== Honours ==
FC Barcelona B

- Medalla del Ayuntamiento
  - Champions: 1902
