= 1904–05 FC Barcelona season =

6th season in existence of FC Barcelona

FC Barcelona
1904–05 season
- President: Arthur Witty
- Campionat de Catalunya: First
Home colours	Away colours

The 1904–05 season was the sixth soccer season for FC Barcelona.

== Events ==
Barcelona becomes champion of Catalonia for the first time.

== Squad ==
Note: Flags indicate national team as defined under FIFA eligibility rules; some limited exceptions apply. Players may hold more than one non-FIFA nationality.

No.	Pos.	Nation	Player
—	GK	ESP	Joan Soler
—	DF	ESP	Arthur Witty
—	DF	ENG	Miguel Morris
—	DF	URU	Pizo
—	MF	ESP	Carles Comamala
—	MF	ESP	Josep Vidal
—	MF	ESP	Josep Quirante
—	MF	ESP	Josep Ortiz
—	MF	ESP	Francisco Sanz

No.	Pos.	Nation	Player
—	FW	ESP	Romà Forns
—	FW	ENG	Stanley Harris
—	FW	GER	Udo Steinberg
—	FW	ESP	Pérez
—	FW	ENG	Henry Whil
—	FW	ENG	Enrique Morris
—	FW	SCO	Joseph Black
—	FW	ESP	George Noble
—	FW	ESP	Luis de Ossó
—	FW	ESP	Bernardo Lassaletta

== Results ==
=== Friendly ===
26 November 1904	Català FC	1 – 0	FC Barcelona	Barcelona
				Stadium: Catala; Referee: Jaime Vila

7 December 1904	Català FC	3 – 1	FC Barcelona	Barcelona
				Stadium: Velódromo de la Bonanova

8 December 1904	Club Espanyol	2 – 1	FC Barcelona	Barcelona
			Black	Stadium: Espanyol; Referee: Escardo

26 December 1904	FC Barcelona	4 – 0	Stade Olympique Toulouse	Barcelona
	Gamper; Steinberg; Lassaletta			Stadium: Espanyol; Referee: Vidal

6 January 1905	FC Vilafranca	0 – 6	FC Barcelona	Barcelona
			Chown; Ossó; Comamala	Stadium: Vilafranca; Referee: Batlle

26 February 1905	FC Barcelona	2 – 3 (Note: Opening the field of Muntaner)	Català FC	Barcelona
	Comamala; Quirante		Goal	Stadium: Camp del Carrer Muntaner; Referee: George Meyer

1 June 1905	FC Barcelona	3 – 1	FC Internacional	Barcelona
	Comamala; Quirante			Stadium: Associacio; Referee: Vinyes

=== Sportsmen's Club Cup ===
24 September 1904 Semifinal	Club Espanyol	1 – 3	FC Barcelona	Barcelona
			Ossó; Steinberg; Forns	Stadium: Espanyol; Referee: Darné

26 September 1904 Final	FC Internacional	1 – 0 (Note: Game with extended 15 minutes)	FC Barcelona	Barcelona
	Colmenares 105'			Stadium: Placa d'Armes del Parc; Referee: Eduardo Alesson

=== Catalan football championship ===
11 December 1904 Round 2	X Sporting Club	0 – 1	FC Barcelona	Barcelona
		Report	Steinberg	Stadium: Camp de l'Hospital Clínic; Referee: Eduardo Alesson

8 January 1905 Round 4	FC Barcelona	6 – 0	Català FC	Barcelona
	Forns; Quirante; H. Morris; Steinberg	Report		Stadium: Camp de l'Hospital Clínic; Referee: George Meyer

29 January 1905 Round 5	FC Barcelona	2 – 2	FC Internacional	Barcelona
	Forns; H. Morris	Report	Goal	Stadium: Camp de l'Hospital Clínic; Referee: Joaquim Carril

12 February 1905 Round 7	FC Barcelona	1 – 1	Club Español	Barcelona
	Vidal	Report	Green	Stadium: Camp de l'Hospital Clínic; Referee: Degollada

12 March 1905 Round 8	FC Barcelona	4 – 1	X Sporting Club	Barcelona
		Report		Stadium: Camp de l'Hospital Clínic

2 April 1905 Round 10	Català FC	4 – 1	FC Barcelona	Barcelona
	Goal	Report	Ossó 45'	Stadium: Camp de l'Hospital Clínic; Referee: George Meyer

7 May 1905 Round 13	FC Internacional	1 – 2	FC Barcelona	Barcelona
	Goal		Comamala; Black	Stadium: Camp de l'Hospital Clínic; Referee: Darné

21 May 1905 Round 14	Club Español	2 – 3	FC Barcelona	Barcelona
	Ponz		Black; Forns	Stadium: Camp de l'Hospital Clínic; Referee: Park
