= 1902 Copa Pergamino =

Tournament details
- Country: Spain
- Dates: September–November
- Teams: 5

Final positions
- Champions: Iberia SC (1st title)
- Runner-up: Irish FC

The 1902 Copa Pergamino, also mentioned as Concurs Pergamí, was a football competition held in Barcelona between September and November 1902. Its promoter was the cartoonist and calligrapher Eugeni Bargés i Prat, who gave a polychrome parchment of his creation as a gift to be contested in the events of the Festes de la Mercè.

== History ==
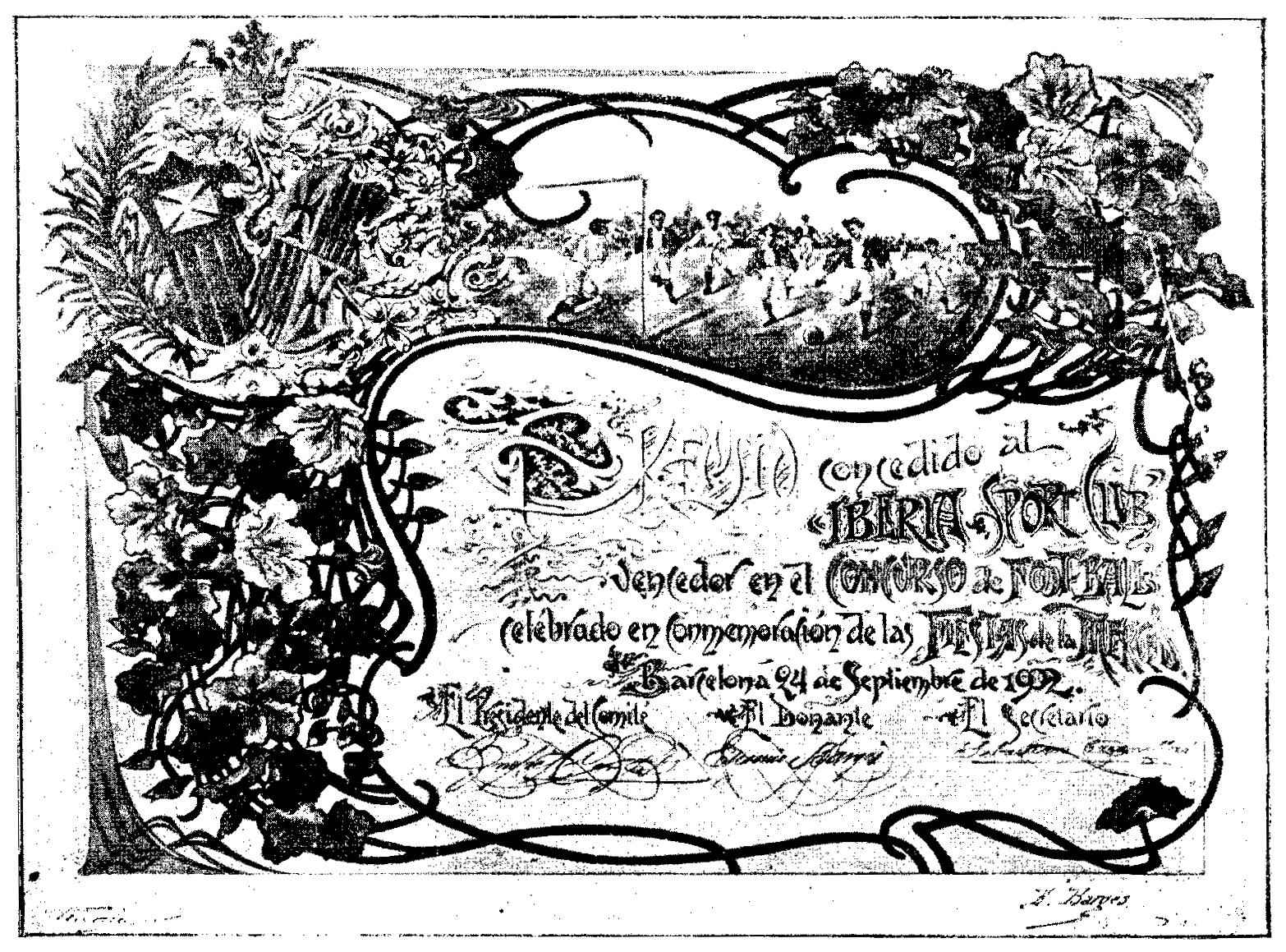
Scroll image inserted in Los Deportes.

The competition, which was open only to those teams founded during the 1901–1902 season that had not participated in the Copa Macaya, was contested by teams: Irish FC, Iberia SC, FC Internacional, Catalonia FC, and Club Catalunya de Foot-ball, according to the names of the time. FC Internacional, however, withdrew in the middle of the contest after a controversy in its match against the Irish. Iberia was proclaimed champion, after winning by the minimum of the tiebreaker, also against the Irish.

Despite being intended for modest clubs, the organizing committee of the contest was made up of members of the main entities of the city:

- President: Andreu Camps Sala, from the Irish FC
- Secretary: Sebastian Casanellas, from the Spanish Club
- Vocals: Pere Cabot, Luis de Ossó, and Josep Vidal, all three from FC Barcelona.

=== Results ===
		Punts	J	G	E	P	GF	GC	DG
1.	Ibèria SC	12	7	6	0	1	27	4	23
2.	Irish FC	12	7	6	0	1	26	2	24
3.	Catalònia FC	4	6	2	0	4	6	16	10
4.	Club Internacional	2	3	1	0	2	11	4	7
5.	Club Catalunya	0	7	0	0	7	0	44	44

Jornada
1	21 September 1902	Internacional	-	Ibèria	1	-	2
1	21 September 1902	Catalunya	-	Irish	0	-	9
2	5 October 1902	Irish	-	Catalònia	5	-	0
2	5 October 1902	Ibèria	-	Catalunya	4	-	0
3	12 October 1902	Irish	-	Ibèria	1	-	0
3	12 October 1902	Catalònia	-	Catalunya	4	-	0
4	19 October 1902	Ibèria	-	Catalònia	4	-	1
4	19 October 1902	Internacional	-	Catalunya	10	-	0
5	26 October 1902	Catalunya	-	Ibèria	0	-	9
5	26 October 1902	Irish	-	Internacional	2	-	0
6	1 November 1902	Irish	-	Catalunya	7	-	0
6	1 November 1902	Internacional	-	Catalònia		—
7	9 November 1902	Catalònia	-	Ibèria	0	-	6
8	16 November 1902	Ibèria	-	Irish	2	-	1
8	16 November 1902	Catalunya	-	Catalònia	0	-	1
9	23 November 1902	Catalònia	-	Irish	0	-	1
Final	30 November 1902	Ibèria	-	Irish	1	-	0

		Ibèria SC	Irish FC	Catalònia FC	Club Internacional	Club Catalunya
1.	Ibèria SC		2:1	4:1	No jugat	4:0
2.	Irish FC	1:0		5:0	2:0	7:0
3.	Catalònia FC	0:6	0:1		No jugat	4:0
4.	Club Internacional	1:2	No jugat	Suspès		10:0
5.	Club Catalunya	0:9	0:9	0:1	No jugat	

== See also ==
- 1902 Medalla del Ayuntamiento
