= Albert Almasqué =

Spanish footballer (1888–1976)

Alberto Almasqué
Personal information
- Full name: Albert Almasqué Domènech
- Birth name: Albert Almasqué i Domènech
- Date of birth: 25 December 1888
- Place of birth: Barcelona, Catalonia, Spain
- Date of death: 10 July 1976 (aged 87)
- Place of death: Miami, Florida, United States
- Position: Defender

Senior career*
Years	Team	Apps	(Gls)
1901–1903	Barcelona	11	(0)
1903–1906	Català		
1906–1909	Barcelona	12	
- * Club domestic league appearances and goals

Albert Almasqué Domènech (25 December 1888 – 10 July 1976) was a Spanish footballer who played as a defender for FC Barcelona. He is best known for being the youngest player to have played an official competitive match for FC Barcelona, which he achieved in 1902 at the age of just 13.

He is the younger brother of Alfonso Almasqué, who also played for Barcelona, and in doing so, they became the first Catalan brothers in the club's history. He immigrated to the United States in 1940, where he was a successful businessman, and he was also president of Nestlé in Chile, Bolivia and Cuba, where he had to go into exile because of the Cuban Revolution.

== Early life ==
Albert Almasqué was born in the Catalonian town of Barcelona on 25 December 1888, as the third of five children from the marriage of Alfonso Almasqué Irigoyen (1858–1897) and Rosa de Lima Domènech Sagristà (1864–1940). In 1916, he married Concepción Fernandez Casariego in London, with whom he had two sons, Alberto and Enrique, as well as a daughter, Concepción Rosa, who died within weeks of her birth in 1917. With his second wife, Sara González, he had a third child, Teodoro.

The Almasqué brothers lived their childhood and adolescence in Switzerland, where they studied and also learned about football. When Alfonso finished his studies in 1901, they returned to Barcelona, where Alberto continued and then completed his studies.

== Playing career ==
When they returned to Barcelona, the Almasqué brothers joined the ranks of their hometown club, FC Barcelona, becoming members of the club's reserve/second team. In the second half of the 1901–02 season, Almasqué, who had just turned 13, played four friendly matches with the first team.

At the start of the following season, Barcelona were lacking multiple first team players for unclear reasons, so they had to include members of the second team, such as Luis Puelles, Josep Llobet, and Almasqué, with each of them playing in all five matches held in November 1902. He thus made his official competitive debut for Barça against Hispania AC in the Copa Macaya held at the Camp del carrer Muntaner on 30 November 1902, at the age of 13 years, 11 months and 6 days, thus becoming the youngest footballer to debut with the first team in any official competition; far ahead of the likes of Paulino Alcantara and Lamine Yamal, who both made their official debut at 15, and also ahead of Armando Sagi and Carles Comamala, who did it at 14. However, some historians and sources remain doubtful about the veracity of this, suggesting that Alfonso, who is five years older, could have been the one who played this match. With the return of the missing first-team players, the role of Puelles, Llobet, and Almasqué was once again reduced to sporadic appearances, mostly in friendlies.

At the beginning of the 20th century, many families had several footballers in the Barça first team, such as the English Witty, Parsons, and St. Noble, as well as the Filipinos Morris, but it was the Almasqués who went down in history as the first Catalan brothers of the entity. In order to distinguish them in the match chronicles, the Barcelona press dubbed them as Almasqué I (Alfonso) and Almasqué II (Alberto), which was common at the time. Between 1902 and 1909, the Almasqués played just 40 games with Barça's first team, but only four were competitive and official, each with two, corresponding to the Copa Macaya, the Copa Barcelona and the Catalan championship. Alberto's second official appearance was only in the 1908–09 Catalan Championship, which Barça won. During this period, the Almasqués spent three seasons with Català FC between 1903 and 1906.

== Later life ==
In the mid-1910s, Almasqué immigrated to the United States, where he was a successful businessman, becoming the director of the Nestlé multinational in Chile and Bolivia (1916–1920), and in Cuba (1921–1931), a country in which he was a member of the Rotary Club and the Lions Club. He presided over not only the National Association of Cuban Industries (ANIC) between 1932 and 1942, but also the National Food Company SA, a subsidiary in Cuba of The Nestlé Company Incorporated.

Almasqué was a powerful member of the Cuban oligarchy at the time of the Cuban revolution, which forced him into exile in Miami.

== Death ==
In 1940, Almasqué immigrated to Miami, where he died on 10 July 1976, at the age of 87.

== Honours ==
Barcelona

- Catalan championship:
  - Champions (2): 1909
