= Vicente Reig =

Spanish footballer and executive

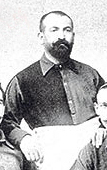
- Reig in 1903

7th President of FC Barcelona
- In office 11 November 1908 – 2 December 1908
- Preceded by: Juli Marial
- Succeeded by: Joan Gamper

Personal details
- Born: 1866 Borriol, Valencian Community
- Died: 18 December 1918 (aged 51-52) Barcelona, Spain
Association football career
- Full name: Vicente Reig Falomir
- Birth name: Vicenç Reig i Falomir
- Position: Goalkeeper
Senior career*
Years	Team	Apps	(Gls)
1900–1903	FC Barcelona	40	(0)
- * Club domestic league appearances and goals

Vicente Reig Falomir (1866 – 18 December 1918) was a Spanish footballer who played as a goalkeeper for FC Barcelona, and most notably, he was the 7th President of the said club in 1908, holding the position for 22 days, the shortest term in the history of the entity. The exact day of his birth remains uncertain, given that the parish archive of Borriol where he was born was burned at the beginning of the Spanish Civil War.

== Playing career ==
In his twenties, Reig practiced cycling and Basque football. He joined FC Barcelona in the autumn of 1900, and despite his already advanced age of 33 or 34 years old, he was Barça's undisputed goalkeeper during the three seasons he remained at the club between 1900 and 1903 (although he also occasionally played in defence), and Reig was thus part of the side that competed in the inaugural edition of the Copa Macaya, the very first football competition played on the Iberian Peninsula, starting in the decisive match against Hispania AC which ended in a 1–1 draw that proved enough for Hispania to win the title.

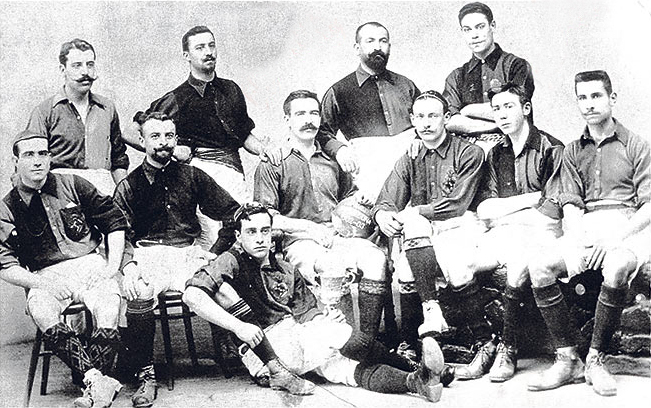
FC Barcelona in 1903. Standing: Llobet, Terradas, Reigand Vidal. Seated: Ossó, Steinberg, Meyer, Witty, Gamper, Harris and Lassaletta.

In the following season, however, Reig played a crucial role in Barça's first-ever title, the 1901–02 Copa Macaya, as he conceded only two goals in the eight games played in the tournament, keeping a clean-sheet in the final matchday on 23 March 1902 in a 15–0 victory over Català SC. The Copa Macaya is now recognized as the first Catalan championship.

In 1902, Reig was a member of the Barcelona team that participated in the Copa de la Coronación (predecessor of Copa del Rey), and he started in the semi-final against Real Madrid (then Madrid FC) on 13 May, in what was the very first El Clásico in history, which ended in a 3–1 win. However, he was replaced by Samuel Morris in the final, and without him, Barça were defeated 1–2 by Club Vizcaya.

In 1903, his last year as a player, he added a new title to his career, the Copa Barcelona, which was later recognized as the fourth edition of the Catalan Championship. In total he played 40 games with FC Barcelona, including 14 in the Copa Macaya and 11 in the Copa Barcelona, doing so at an advanced age (between 34 and 37 years old).

== Club presidency ==
He took over the presidency on 11 November 1908, replacing Juli Marial. Although at first he rejected the appointment, alleging multiple commitments, he accepted the presidency at the insistence of the assembly.

Reig inherited Barça in the worst moment in its history: The club was in a drastic situation, with only 38 members left, the most loyal, and Reig had to struggle against the general apathy of those around him. He was keen to solve the crisis, but when he saw just how bad things had become, he presented his resignation on 2 December 1908, just 22 days after his take over, in an extraordinary general meeting at which the club would have disappeared for good had it not been for Joan Gamper, who had to step in to save the club from bankruptcy, becoming its president for the first time since he had founded the club.

== Death ==
Reig ran a women's fashion store on Calle Call number 9 and died in December 1918 without leaving any children (he was single). He died at the age of 52, victim of pneumonia.

== Honours ==
FC Barcelona

- Copa Macaya:
  - Champions: 1901–02
  - Runner-up: 1900–01
- Copa de la Coronación:
  - Runner-up: 1902
- Copa Barcelona
  - Champions: 1902–03
