= Luis Puelles =

Spanish footballer

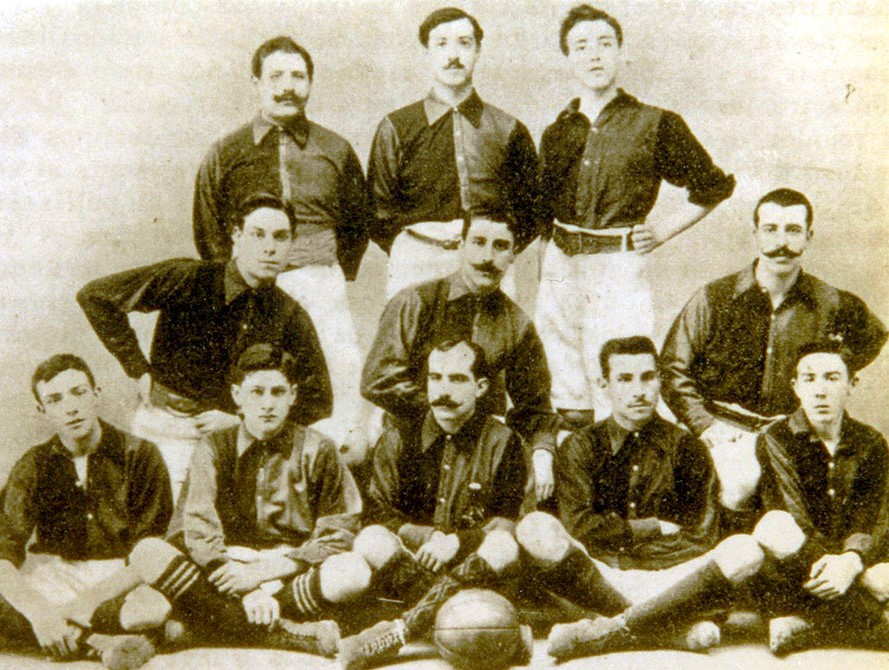
- Puelles Pàmies (standing, center) in 1902

Personal information
- Full name: Luis Puelles Pàmies
- Birth name: Lluís Puelles Pàmies
- Date of birth: 1877
- Place of birth: Barcelona, Catalonia, Spain
- Positions: Goalkeeper; defender

Senior career*
Years	Team	Apps	(Gls)
- Marsella
1900–1903	FC Barcelona		
- * Club domestic league appearances and goals

Luis Puelles Pàmies (1877 – after 1902) was a Spanish footballer who played as a goalkeeper and defender for FC Barcelona. He played an important role in the conquest of Barça's first official titles, the 1901–02 Copa Macaya, which was the club's first-ever piece of silverware, and the 1902–03 Copa Barcelona.

Puelles was also an outstanding Basque pelota player. The date of his death is unknown.

== Career ==
=== Early career ===
Born in the Catalonian town of Barcelona in 1877, Puelles was introduced to football during his time as a student in Marseille. When he returned to Barcelona, he joined the ranks of FC Barcelona, becoming a member of the reserve/second team, which was mainly made up of Catalans, where he featured alongside the likes of Alfonso Albéniz, Josep Llobet, and Luis de Ossó. He was a member of the Barça B team that won lesser tournaments organized by the Spanish Gymnastics Federation, such as the 1902 Medalla del Ayuntamiento between February and June 1902.

Puelles made his official competitive debut for the club's first team on 14 April 1901, starting in the last match of the first edition of the Copa Macaya, which would decide the winner of the tournament between FC Barcelona and Hispania AC, with the latter only needing a draw to win it, which they did after holding Barça to a 1–1 draw. In the following season, however, Puelles helped the club win the 1901–02 Copa Macaya, the club's first-ever piece of silverware.

=== Copa de la Coronación ===
When Barcelona participated in the very first national tournament played in Spain, the 1902 Copa de la Coronación, the club struggled with organizing the trip to Madrid since not all of its first team players could go, so they had to include members of the second team, such as Albéniz, Llobet, and Puelles, who thus joined the main squad, which included Joan Gamper, the Morris brothers (Samuel, Enrique and Miguel), and Udo Steinberg. He appears in the official report under his mother's name, Luis Pàmies, which years later caused some confusion among Barcelona and football historians.

In the semifinals on 13 May, Puelles went down in history as one of the eleven footballers who played in the very first El Clásico in history, playing as a goalkeeper in the absence of Samuel Morris, who had opted to referee the other semifinal tie, and conceding only once to help his side to a 3–1 win. He then featured in the final against Club Bizcaya (a combination of players from Athletic Club and Bilbao Football Club), this time as a defender due to the return of Morris; Barça lost 2–1.

=== Later career ===
At the start of the 1902–03 season, Barcelona was lacking multiple first-team players for unclear reasons, so they had to include members of the second team, such as Alberto Almasqué, Llobet, and Puelles, with each of them playing in all five matches held in November 1902, including in the opening match of the 1902–03 Copa Macaya on 30 November against Hispania AC. Barça won the match 2–0, but the result was later declared invalid due to Barça's irregularities in the lineup of foreign players, so they withdrew from the tournament in protest. With the return of the missing first-team players, the role of Almasqué, Llobet, and Puelles was once again reduced to sporadic appearances, mostly in friendly matches.

In total, Puelles played 36 matches with Barcelona, but only three of them were competitive fixtures.

== Honours ==
FC Barcelona

- Copa Macaya:
  - Champions (1): 1901–02
- Copa Barcelona:
  - Champions (1): 1902–03
