= Paul Widerkehr =

Swiss footballer

Personal information
- Date of birth: 12 September 1880
- Place of birth: Zurich, Switzerland
- Date of death: Unknown
- Position: Midfielder

Senior career*
Years	Team	Apps	(Gls)
1898–1901	Zürich		
1901–1902	Barcelona		
- * Club domestic league appearances and goals

Paul Widerkehr (12 September 1880 – unknown) was a Swiss footballer who played as a midfielder for Barcelona in the 1901–02 season, helping the club win its first-ever trophy, the 1901–02 Copa Macaya.

== Biography ==
Born in Zurich on 12 September 1880, Widerkehr began his career at his hometown club FC Zürich, where he played alongside his friends Joan Gamper and George Meyer, with whom he later played at Barcelona. He was registered at the Swiss consulate in Barcelona in 1901.

In the 1901–02 season, Widerkehr played six official matches for Barça, all in the 1901–02 Copa Macaya, scoring six goals, all of which came in a 12–0 win over Català FC on 16 February 1902, making him the tournament's third-highest scorer behind teammates Gamper (19) and Udo Steinberg (17). He was thus a member of the Barça team that won the 1901–02 Copa Macaya, the club's first-ever trophy. Despite some encouraging first steps at Barça, he was forced to retire early due to health problems. Along with Gamper and Meyer, he was part of the club's first sports committee, which was in charge of forming Barça, thus making him one of the first managers of Barcelona.

Outside of football, he was a merchant.

== Honours ==
FC Barcelona

- Copa Macaya:
  - Champions: 1901–02
