= Castellví =

Castellvi or Castellví may refer to:

== People ==
- Francesc de Castellví i de Vic (–1506), Spanish co-author of Scachs d'amor
- Josefina Castellví (1935–2026), Spanish oceanographer
- José María Castellví (1900–1944), Catalan film director
- Manuel de Castellví (1886–1950), Spanish footballer
- Vilmarie Castellvi (born 1981), Puerto Rican tennis player

== Places ==
- Castellví de Rosanes, municipality in the comarca of the Baix Llobregat
- Castellví de la Marca, municipality in the comarca of Alt Penedès
- Castellvi Peak, peak on Hurd Peninsula, Livingston Island
