= Josep Llobet =

Spanish footballer and pharmacist (1875–1937)

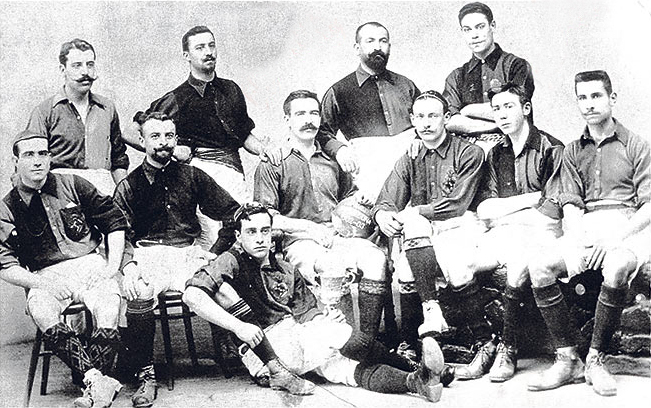
- Llobet (standing, first to left) in 1903

Personal information
- Birth name: Josep Llobet i Llobet
- Date of birth: 1875
- Place of birth: Barcelona, Catalonia, Spain
- Date of death: 1937 (aged 61-2)
- Place of death: Barcelona, Catalonia, Spain
- Positions: Defender; midfielder

Senior career*
Years	Team	Apps	(Gls)
1899–1904	FC Barcelona	54	(5)
- * Club domestic league appearances and goals

Josep Llobet i Llobet (1875 – 1937) was a Spanish footballer who played as a defender and midfielder for FC Barcelona between 1899 and 1904. He was one of the most important footballers in the amateur beginnings of FC Barcelona, being among the 12 founders of the club in 1899, and then serving Barça as a player for six years, featuring in the club's first-ever match and winning the 1901–02 Copa Macaya, which was the club's first-ever official title.

In addition to football, he also practiced other modalities such as fencing and sailing, belonging to the Club Regatas de Barcelona, and in his civilian life, he was a pharmaceutical representative.

== Early and personal life ==
Josep Llobet was born in 1875 as the child of Josep Llobet i Vilaclara and Madrona Llobet i Mateu, who had 12 children and lived in Palau Llobet, which stood on Carrer de Montcada.

In 1915, the 40-year-old Llobet married the 19-year-old Juanita Gaitx, with whom he lived in Sant Pere and with whom he had nine children: Josep Maria, Joana, Concepció, Juli, Núria, Miquel, Maria Rosa, Jordi, and Luís.

== Sporting career ==
Along with Luis de Ossó, Llobet was a member of the Club Regatas de Barcelona, where he served on the ship Colón, with which he participated in several sailing races. He also liked fencing, hunting, and shooting, so he regularly participated in these competitions as well.

== Footballing career ==
=== Early career ===
Llobet was one of the twelve men who attended the historic meeting held at the Gimnasio Solé on 29 November 1899, which saw the birth of Football Club Barcelona. Ten days after its foundation, on 8 December, he went down in history as one of the ten footballers who played in Barcelona's official debut, played at the Velódromo de la Bonanova against a team known as Team Anglès, which consisted of members of the British colony living in Barcelona. However, he did not often play in the following matches, preferring to play with the second team, which was mainly made up of Catalans, where he featured alongside the likes of Ossó, Alfonso Albéniz, Luis Puelles.

Llobet made his official competitive debut for the club's first team on 14 April 1901, starting in the last match of the first edition of the Copa Macaya, which would decide the winner of the tournament between FC Barcelona and Hispania AC, with the latter only needing a draw to win it, which they did after holding Barça to a 1–1 draw.

=== 1901–1902 season ===
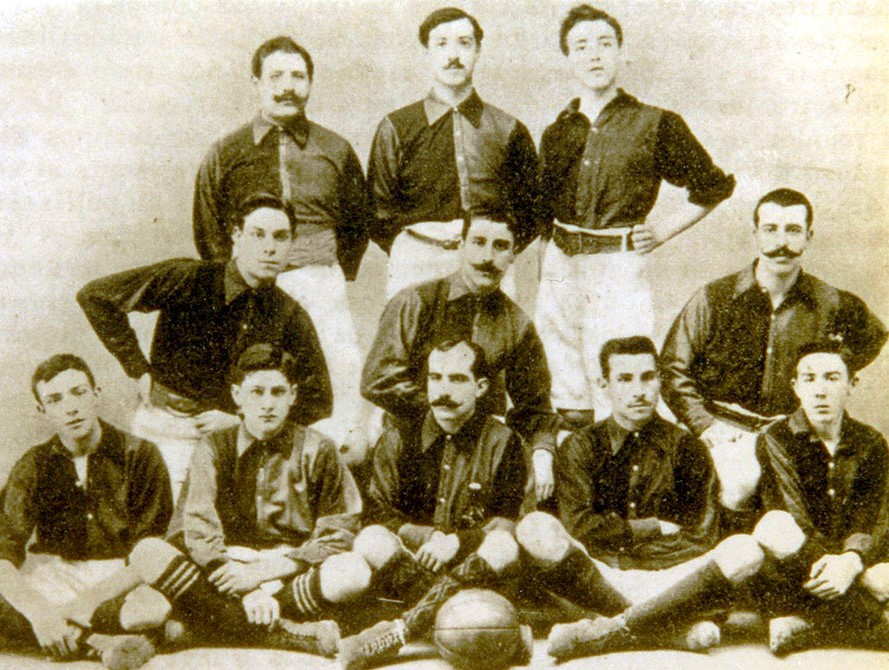
Llobet (crouching, center) with the Barcelona second team in 1902.

In the following season, Llobet made two official appearances, the first of which was in the opening match of the 1901–02 Copa Macaya against Club Español on 22 December 1901, thus being part of the squad that ended up winning the tournament; the club's first-ever official title. In the build-up for the 1902 Copa de la Coronación, Barça struggled with organizing the trip to Madrid since not all of its first team players could go, so they had to include members of the second team, such as Llobet, Albéniz, and Puelles. In the semifinals on 13 May, Llobet went down in history as one of the eleven footballers who played in the very first El Clásico in history, which ended in a 3–1 win to the Catalans; Barça lost the final 2–1 to Bizcaya.

Also in 1902, Llobet was a member of the Barça B team that won lesser tournaments organized by the Spanish Gymnastics Federation, such as the 1902 Medalla del Ayuntamiento between February and June 1902.

=== 1902–1903 season ===
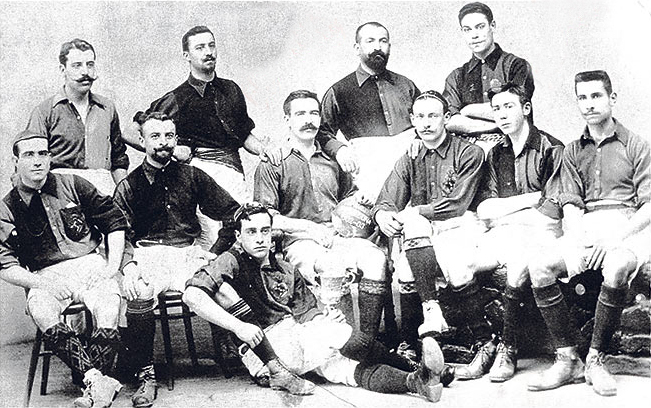
Llobet (standing, first from left) with the Barcelona squad in 1903.

At the start of the 1902–03 season, Barcelona was lacking multiple first-team players for unclear reasons, so they had to include members of the second team such as Albert Almasqué, Puelles, and Llobet, with each of them playing in all five matches held in November 1902, including in the opening match of the 1902–03 Copa Macaya on 30 November against Hispania AC. Barça won the match 2–0, but the result was later declared invalid due to Barça's irregularities in the lineup of foreign players, so they withdrew from the tournament in protest. With the return of the missing first-team players, the role of Almasqué, Puelles, and Llobet was once again reduced to sporadic appearances, mostly in friendlies.

=== Later career ===
Llobet made his last official competitive appearance in a Catalan championship match against Espanyol on 24 April 1904, which ended in a 4–4 draw. The following week, on 1 May 1904, he started in a friendly against Stade Olympien des Etudiants de Toulouse (SOET) in Toulouse, the club's first-ever trip abroad. He played his last match for Barcelona, official or otherwise, on 26 September 1906.

Between 1901 and 1907, Llobet was a member of the board as the club's treasurer (1901–02 and 1903–05), vocal (1902–03), and he also served as vice-president, a position which he held from 6 October 1905 until 1907. In total, Llobet made 54 appearances for Barça; 50 in friendlies and only four in official competitive matches; scoring a total of six goals, all in friendlies.

== Death ==
Llobet died of a heart attack in 1937, at the age of either 61 or 62 years.

One of his great-nephews went on to become mayor of Lloret de Mar, the town where Barça's founder, Joan Gamper, used to spend his summers, precisely at the home of another Josep Llobet.

== Honours ==
FC Barcelona

- Copa Macaya:
  - Champions: 1901–02
- Copa de la Coronación
  - Runner-up: 1902

FC Barcelona II

- Medalla del Ayuntamiento
  - Champions: 1902
