= Bernardo Lassaletta =

Spanish footballer and academic (1882–1948)

Bernado Lassaletta
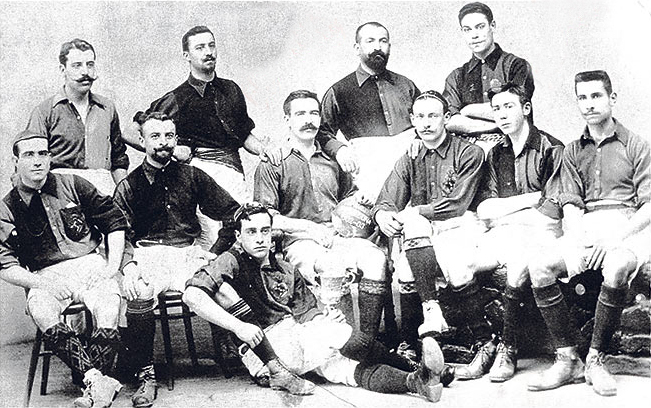
- Lassaletta (seated, first to right) in 1903

Personal information
- Full name: Bernado Lassaletta Perrín
- Birth name: Bernat Lassaleta i Perrín
- Date of birth: 20 August 1882
- Place of birth: Alicante, Spain
- Date of death: 12 March 1948 (aged 65)
- Place of death: Barcelona, Spain
- Position: Forward

Senior career*
Years	Team	Apps	(Gls)
1901–1904	FC Barcelona	57	(67)
- * Club domestic league appearances and goals

Bernado Lassaletta Perrín (20 August 1882 – 12 March 1948) was a Spanish industrial engineer, professor and footballer who played as a forward for FC Barcelona between 1901 and 1904.

== Playing career ==
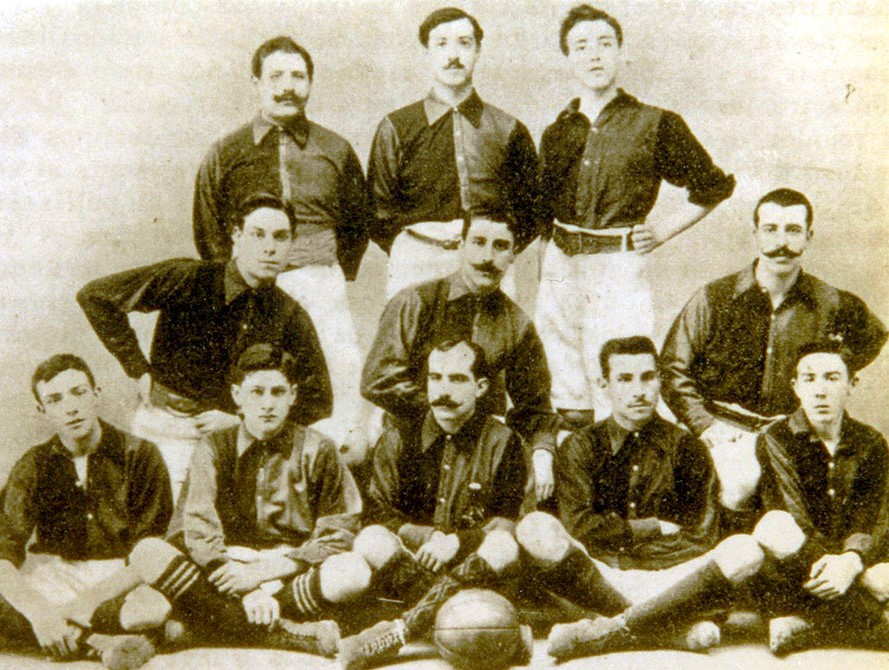
Lassaletta (seating, second from right) with the Barcelona second team in 1902.

Born in the Valencian town of Alicante on 20 August 1882, Lassaletta began his career at FC Barcelona in 1901, aged 19, making his official debut with the first team on 19 January 1902, in a Copa Macaya match against Espanyol, helping his side to a 4–0 win. Later that year, he was member of the Barcelona second team that won lesser tournaments organized by the Spanish Gymnastics Federation, such as the 1902 Medalla del Ayuntamiento between February and June 1902. In June 1902, the journalists of the Spanish newspaper Los Deportes described him as a 19-year-old who "distinguished himself with his strong footwork and determination to score".

Together with the likes of Joan Gamper, Luis de Ossó, Udo Steinberg, and Carles Comamala, he helped Barça win the Copa Barcelona, netting 5 goals in the tournament that was later recognized as the fourth edition of the Catalan Championship. On 1 May 1904, Lassaletta was a member of Barça's first-ever trip abroad, starting in a friendly match against Stade Olympien des Etudiants de Toulouse (SOET) in Toulouse, scoring once in a 3–2 win. In total, he scored 78 goals in just 59 matches for Barça, of which 19 goals came in 22 official matches.

In addition to football, he was also active as a pelotari, cyclist, and driver.

== Professional career ==
Lassaletta was an industrial engineer and professor of general metallurgy and electrical technology at the School of Industrial Engineers in Barcelona. As the Professor of Industrial Engineering at the University of Barcelona, he organized the first interschool tournaments in the city. In 1910, he became the head of the testing laboratory of Siemens Schuckert Indústria Elèctrica SA in Catalonia. In 1921, Lassaletta was named a full academician of the Academy of Sciences and Arts in Barcelona, where he presented numerous papers and works.

In 1923, Lassaletta was part of the entourage that not only welcomed Albert Einstein on his visit to Catalonia at the invitation of the Commonwealth of Catalonia, but that then accompanied him during his visit to the Poblet Abbey, together with his wife Elsa and Ventura Gassol and Rafael Campalans. On 6 March 1923, Einstein was nominated as a corresponding member of the physical sciences section of the Academy by Lassaleta, the mathematician Ferran Tallada, and the physicists Ramon Jardí and Tomas Escriche i Mieg, in a ceremony at the Barcelona's Academy of Sciences and Arts.

== Honours ==
FC Barcelona

- Copa Barcelona
  - Champions: 1902–03
