= Paul Haas =

Spanish businessman (born 1873)

Paul Haas during his presidency

Paul Haas (born in 1873 in Biel/Bienne, Switzerland) was the third president of FC Barcelona, and the first who had not participated in the founding of the institution or been a Barça player.

== Office ==
Haas, who was of German descent, took office on 5 September 1902, replacing Bartomeu Terradas. He led the club until 17 September 1903, when he was succeeded by Arthur Witty. His term as president was a transitional period marked by economic difficulties caused by club maintenance costs and disagreements with the Spanish Gymnastics Federation. The Federation sought to organize a tournament without foreigners, with the intention of controlling FC Barcelona. Haas was one of the proponents of the Football Association of Catalonia, which organised most teams of the era.

During his tenure, FC Barcelona withdrew from the 1902-1903 Copa Macaya, after having their victory against Español nullified. Following the controversy, Haas created the Barcelona Cup (forerunner of Campionat de Catalunya, which would begin the next season). FC Barcelona was proclaimed champion after winning twelve of the fourteen games that shaped the tournament schedule. In addition to creating the Barcelona Cup, FC Barcelona was also a partner in creating the Mercier Cup. Caps were established credit, the cards of Honor, and pushed other initiatives.
