= Charles Hereford =

English soldier and footballer (1882–1943)

Charles Heresford
Personal information
- Full name: Charles Richard Wood Hereford
- Date of birth: 1882
- Place of birth: Halifax, Nova Scotia, Canada
- Date of death: 1943 (aged 60–61)
- Place of death: Hendon, London, England
- Height: 1.69 m (5 ft 7 in)
- Position: Defender

Senior career*
Years	Team	Apps	(Gls)
1899–1902	FC Barcelona	11	(0)
- * Club domestic league appearances and goals

Charles Richard Wood Hereford (1882 – 1943), often misspelled as Charles Heresford, was an English soldier who fought in the Second Boer War in South Africa in 1901, and then a footballer who played as a defender for FC Barcelona in 1903, winning the Copa Barcelona.

== Early life ==
Hereford was born in 1882 in Halifax, Nova Scotia, as the son of Charles, born in Wales in 1836, a general major in the British army who was stationed in Halifax, and of Caroline Emma Wood, born in Hanover in 1864, of British parents. He had a younger sister, Lucy Frances Evelyn, who was born in 1885 in Egypt, his father's new destination. In January 1891, the Hereford family was living in Twickenham, near London.

In 1901, Hereford joined the Natal Mounted Police during the second Boer War in South Africa, but it is unknown if he participated in the war.

== Playing and military career ==
At some point in 1902, Hereford arrived in Barcelona for an unknown reason, but probably due to work. Whilst out in the Catalan capital, he began playing for FC Barcelona, making his debut for the club on the opening match of the Copa Barcelona on 11 January 1903 against Ibèria SC, keeping a clean-sheet in a 7–0 victory. He quickly established himself as an undisputed starter since he went on to play 11 matches between January and April, including in 10 of the 12 Copa Barcelona matches, registering eight wins and two draws along with four clean-sheets, thus contributing decisively in helping Barcelona win the title, hedging out Club Español in the end by just two points. In these 10 matches, he formed a great defensive partnership with Arthur Witty as he lined up on defense alongside him in all, but the last three matches, when he and Emil Gass switched roles. His name was written in the match chronicles of the newspapers in many different ways, such as Hereford, Heresford, or even Herefort.

In 1914, Hereford enlisted as a volunteer in the British Army and then joined the Army Remount Service. During the service, he was arrested on two occasions, but despite this, he still managed to graduate in April 1916. In the military documentation, the occupation was "horse trainer" and he was physically described as 1.69 meters tall, weighs 68 kg, and having gray eyes and brown hair.

== Personal life and death ==
In 1912, Hereford married Mary Georgina Hamond, who in the following year filed for divorce on the grounds of adultery. At the end of 1916, he married again, this time with Constance M Sutton.

Hereford died in Hendon, London, in 1943, at the age of either 60 or 61 years.

== Honours ==
Barcelona

- Copa Barcelona:
  - Champions: 1902–03
