= 1902 Medalla del Ayuntamiento =

Tournament details
- Country: Spain
- Dates: February – June
- Teams: 7

Final positions
- Champions: FC Barcelona (1st title)
- Runners-up: Català FC

Tournament statistics
- Top goal scorer(s): Bernardo Lassaletta (24 goals)

The 1902 Medal of the Spanish Gymnastics Federation also referred to simply as Medalla de la Federació and Medalla del Ayuntamiento was a football competition that was held in Barcelona between February and June 1902. The first edition used the league system and the second edition of the qualifiers.

== First edition ==
On 29 September 1901, Spanish Gymnastics Federation organized a sports program in Parc de la Citadel, where it was contested a silver medal given by the City Council of Barcelona, but the delivery of the medal was ultimately not carried out, being instead held for the upcoming football tournament, whose preparations were carried out by Joan Gamper.

The competition, which was open to every team that did not participate in the 1901–02 Copa Macaya, including some second teams, was contested by 9 teams: Irish FC, Iberia SC, FC Internacional, Catalonia FC, and the second sides of FC Barcelona, Hispania AC, Català FC, Club Espanyol, and Club Universitari, but only 7 teams finished the competition due to the early withdrawal of Hispania and Universitari. On 27 April, Barça secured the title following a 3–1 victory over Català, courtesy of goals from Luis de Ossó (2) and Bernardo Lassaletta, who finished the tournament as its top goalscorers. Ossó was also the main promoter and captain of Barça's second team, which was formed mostly by Catalan players, such as Ricardo Cabot, Manuel de Castellví, Josep Llobet, and Pere Cabot.

=== Results ===
Jornada
1	23 February 1902	Irish	-	Internacional	4	-	1
1	8 May 1902	Barcelona	-	Catalònia	10	–	0
2	2 March 1902	Irish	–	Barcelona	2	-	7
2	2 March 1902	Espanyol	-	Catalònia	5	–	1
3	9 March 1902	Espanyol	–	Català	2	–	1
3	9 March 1902	Ibèria	-	Internacional	1	–	0
3	11 May 1902	Catalònia	-	Irish	0	–	2
4	16 March 1902	Barcelona	–	Internacional	12	-	0
4	16 March 1902	Català	-	Ibèria	2	–	2
4	16 March 1902	Irish	-	Espanyol	2	–	5
5	19 March 1902	Espanyol	-	Barcelona	0	–	2
5	19 March 1902	Català	-	Internacional	2	–	0
5	19 March 1902	Ibèria	-	Catalònia	2	–	0
6	23 March 1902	Barcelona	-	Català	5	–	3
6	23 March 1902	Ibèria	-	Irish	0	–	1
6	23 March 1902	Catalònia	-	Internacional	1	–	1
7	25 March 1902	Català	–	Catalònia	8	-	0
7	25 March 1902	Espanyol	-	Internacional	4	–	2
7	25 March 1902	Irish	-	Ibèria	5	–	2
8	30 March 1902	Irish	-	Català	0	–	0
8	30 March 1902	Catalònia	-	Espanyol	0	–	0
8	13 April 1902	Barcelona	-	Ibèria	4	–	0
9	31 March 1902	Catalònia	-	Barcelona	0	–	4
9	31 March 1902	Internacional	-	Irish	2	–	2
9	11 May 1902	Català	-	Espanyol	7	–	0
10	6 April 1902	Barcelona	-	Irish	6	-	0
10	6 April 1902	Espanyol	-	Ibèria	1	–	1
10	6 April 1902	Internacional	-	Catalònia	0	–	0
11	13 April 1902	Català	–	Irish	2	-	1
11	13 April 1902	Internacional	-	Barcelona	0	–	3
11	13 April 1902	Catalònia	-	Ibèria	0	–	3
12	20 April 1902	Barcelona	-	Espanyol	7	-	0
12	20 April 1902	Irish	-	Catalònia	9	–	1
12	18 May 1902	Ibèria	-	Català	0	–	1
13	27 April 1902	Català	–	Barcelona	1	-	3
13	27 April 1902	Espanyol	-	Irish	2	–	3
13	27 April 1902	Internacional	-	Ibèria	2	–	3
14	4 May 1902	Internacional	-	Espanyol	1	–	5
14	4 May 1902	Ibèria	-	Barcelona	1	–	2
14	4 May 1902	Catalònia	-	Català	0	–	2
15	8 May 1902	Internacional	–	Català	1	-	0
15	8 May 1902	Ibèria	-	Espanyol	0	–	0

		FC Barcelona	FC Català	Irish FC	Club Espanyol	Ibèria SC	FC Internacional	Catalònia FC
1.	FC Barcelona		5–3	6–0	7–0	4–0	12–0	10–0
2.	FC Català	1–3		2–1	7–0	2–2	2–0	8–0
3.	Irish FC	2–7	0–0		2–5	5–2	4–1	9–1
4.	Club Espanyol	0–2	2–1	2–3		1–1	4–2	5–1
5.	Ibèria SC	1–2	0–1	0–1	0–0		1–0	2–0
6.	FC Internacional	0–3	1–0	2–2	1–5	2–3		0–0
7.	Catalònia FC	0–4	0–2	0–2	0–0	0–3	1–1

== Statistics ==
=== Top Scorers ===
Rank	Player	Team	Goals
1	(Catalonia) Bernardo Lassaletta	Barcelona B	24
2	(Catalonia) Luis de Ossó	Barcelona B	19
3	(Catalonia) Josep Biada	Català FC	10
4	(Uruguay) Joaquim Mascaro	Irish FC	8
5	(Catalonia) Sebastian Casanellas	Club Espanyol	7

== Second Edition ==
The success of the first edition and the Copa Macaya led to the consolidation of football in the city, so a second Medalla del Ayuntamiento was held at the end of the season, which was contested by six teams: FC Barcelona, Club Universitari, Club Espanyol, FC Internacional, Catalonia FC, and Catalunya FC, but the first two declined, while Català signed up at the last minute. All the matches were held in the Plaça d'Armes in June, in front of 3,000 spectators.

=== Results ===
Ronda
Prèvia	19 June 1902	Catalunya	-	Espanyol	0	-	5
Semifinal	19 June 1902	Català	-	Catalònia	5	-	0
Semifinal	19 June 1902	Espanyol	-	Internacional	7	-	0
Repesca	24 June 1902	Catalònia	-	Catalunya	5	-	0
3r/4t	24 June 1902	Internacional	-	Catalònia	1	-	1
Final	24 June 1902	Català	-	Espanyol	1	-	2

== See also ==
- 1902 Copa Pergamino
