= Joaquín García (footballer, born 1875) =

Spanish footballer

Personal information
- Full name: Joaquín García Cenarro
- Date of birth: 1875
- Place of birth: Barcelona, Catalonia, Spain
- Date of death: Unknown
- Position: Forward

Senior career*
Years	Team	Apps	(Gls)
1891–1896	Plymouth College		
1901–1902	FC Barcelona		
1902–1904	Club Espanyol		

International career
1903	Barcelona	2	(0)
1904	Catalonia	3	(0)
- * Club domestic league appearances and goals

Joaquín García Cenarro (1875 – Unknown) was a Spanish footballer who played as a forward for FC Barcelona and Club Español (now known as RCD Espanyol). Although little has been recorded of his life, he was one of the most prominent footballers in the Copa Macaya, the first football championship played on the Iberian Peninsula, winning the competition with both Barça (1901–02) and Espanyol (1902–03).

== Club career ==
García was introduced to football during his time as a student in England. While there, he developed a deep interest in football and began playing it in Plymouth. At the age of 26, García returned to Spain and settled in Barcelona, where he decided to continue his love of football and joined the city's main club, FC Barcelona, in 1901.

Together with captain Joan Gamper, Udo Steinberg and Gustavo Green, he played a pivotal role in helping Barça win the 1901–02 Copa Macaya, which was the club's first-ever piece of silverware, netting 5 goals including back-to-back braces against Club University and his future club RCD Espanyol. The following season, he was recruited by Club Español where he spent two seasons. In his first season at the club, together with René Fenouillière, Ángel Ponz, and Gustavo Green, he managed to win the third and last Copa Macaya, which means that he won two back-to-back championships in a row with different teams. Together with Joaquim Escardó, Ángel Rodríguez, and Green, he was part of the team that won the first edition of the Campionat de Catalunya in 1903–04.

=== International career ===
In 1903, García played three friendly matches between teams made up of the best players in Barcelona, the first at Muntaner on 21 May, the second on 8 September, scoring once for the Reds in 3–4 loss to the Whites, and the third on 24 September, a test match between two "Barcelona teams" that was meant to decide who would integrate the first selection of the Catalan national team the following year.

On 13 April 1904, García made his debut for Catalan national team, only its second-ever match, which ended in a 2–3 loss to Sportsmen's Club. In the following month, on 29 May, García played for Espanyol against Catalonia, scoring once in a 4–1 victory; this was his farewell match as he then went on to live in Tangier, Morocco.

== Later life ==
On 29 October 1917, García arrived in the United States from Brest, France. The date of his death is unknown.

== Honours ==
FC Barcelona

- Copa Macaya:
  - Winners (1) 1901–02

RCD Espanyol

- Copa Macaya:
  - Winners (1) 1902–03
- Catalan Championships:
  - Winners (1) 1903–04
