= Luis de Ossó =

Spanish footballer and sports journalist (1877–1931)

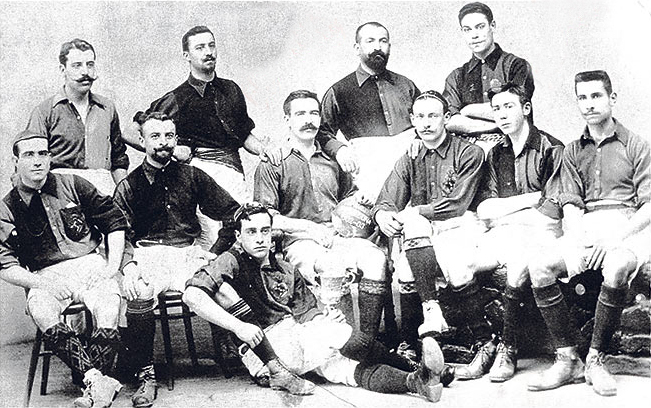
- Ossó (seated, first from the left) in 1903

Personal information
- Full name: Luis de Ossó Serra
- Birth name: Lluís d'Ossó i Serra
- Date of birth: 1877
- Place of birth: Barcelona, Catalonia, Spain
- Date of death: 1 February 1931 (aged 53–54)
- Place of death: Barcelona, Catalonia, Spain
- Position: Forward

Senior career*
Years	Team	Apps	(Gls)
1899–1905	FC Barcelona	72	(68)
1900–1903	FC Barcelona B		
- * Club domestic league appearances and goals

Luis de Ossó Serra (1877 – 1 February 1931) was a Spanish footballer who played as a forward for FC Barcelona. He was one of the most important footballers in the amateur beginnings of FC Barcelona, being among the 12 founders of the club in 1899, and then serving the club as a forward for six years, netting 68 goals in 72 appearances, thus contributing decisively in the conquest of Barça's first official titles, 1901–02 Copa Macaya, which was the club's first-ever official title, 1902–03 Copa Barcelona and the 1904–05 Catalan championship.

== Early life ==
Luis de Ossó was born in the Catalonian town of Barcelona in 1877, as the son of Jaume de Ossó Cervelló and Teresa Serra Sandiumenge, both originally from Vinebre in the south of Tarragona. His father's brother, Saint Enrique de Ossó i Cervelló, was the founding priest of the Congregation of the Teresianas, being canonized by Pope John Paul II in 1993. He lived for a few years at Carrer del Duc.

== Career ==
=== Founding FC Barcelona ===
On 29 November 1899, Ossó was one of the twelve men who founded Futbol Club Barcelona in the historic meeting held at the Gimnasio Solé, in which the 22-year-old Ossó was elected as the club's first secretary, a position that he held for two years, until 1901, a notable feat back when changes in the board were very constant. His presence in the meeting was most likely a result of his connection with the gym's owner, Manuel Solé, who was also from the south of Tarragona. He is considered the first patron of the club because he made Barça's very first economic investments, such as securing a lease for a piece of land next to the Hotel Casanovas (where today the Hospital de Sant Pau stands), which served as the club's second playing field between 1900 and 1901.

Ten days later, on 8 December, Ossó went down in history as one of the ten footballers who played in Barcelona's official debut at the Velódromo de la Bonanova, which ended in a 0–1 loss to a team known as Team Anglès, which consisted of members of the British colony living in Barcelona. The owner of a printing press, Ossó was a contributor to the weekly newspaper Los Deportes, where he published the news of Barça and chronicles of its first matches, always under the pseudonym Un delantero ("A striker"). In the first issue of the year 1900, he wrote an article asking what football should be called, since he did not like the term juego de pelota, but no one was able to answer him, so he continued calling it foot-ball. According to Alberto Maluquer, Ossó wrote a diary in which he reviewed the most important events of Barça's early years, basically acting as a historian of those years, but this work was lost in the fire that broke out many years later in the family printing house. He was responsible, together with Gamper and Walter Wild, for drafting the club's statutes.

=== Titles with both the first and second teams ===
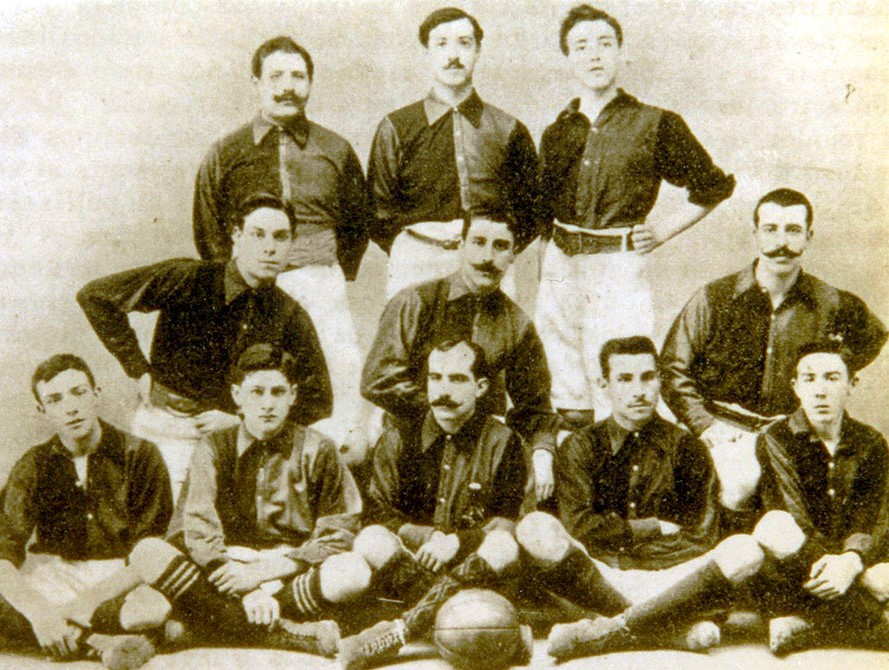
Ossó (seated, center, with ball) with the Barcelona second team in 1902.

Unlike Joan Gamper, who envisaged a club that served as a means of social integration and was open to everyone, Ossó was more interested in making Barça a team of purely Catalans and Spaniards as a means to expel Protestants, owning it to his kinship with Saint Enrique of Ossó, but it was only after Gamper's departure from the club in December 1900 that Ossó was able to make Barça play its first-ever match without any foreigners against Sociedad Española, the forerunner of Espanyol. During the presidency of Bartomeu Terrades, Ossó officially created the club's second and third teams, which was mainly made up of Catalans. He refused to play for the first team several times, as he instead preferred to play with the second, where he was the captain of a team featuring the likes of Alfonso Albéniz, Luis Puelles, and fellow club founders Josep Llobet and Pere Cabot. With the club's second team, Ossó won lesser tournaments organized by the Spanish Gymnastics Federation, such as the 1902 Medalla del Ayuntamiento and the 1902 Copa Pergamino.

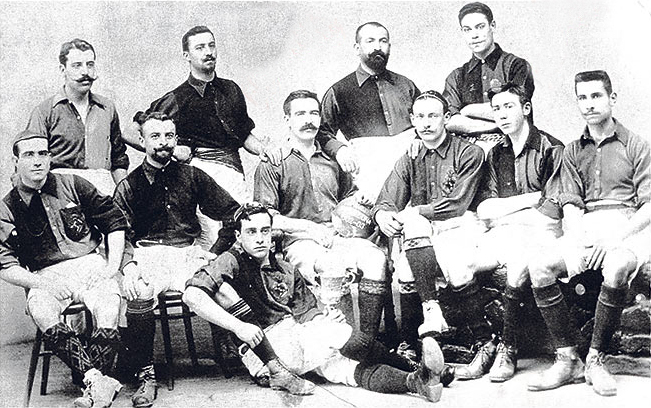
FC Barcelona in 1903. Standing: Llobet, Terradas, Reig and Vidal. Seated: Ossó, Steinberg, Meyer, Witty, Gamper, Harris and Lassaletta.

Ossó participated in the conquest of the very first official titles of FC Barcelona: The inaugural edition of the Copa Macaya, the very first football competition played on the Iberian Peninsula, which ended in a narrow runner-up finish to Hispania AC. In the following season, however, Ossó played a crucial role in Barça's first-ever title, the 1901–02 Copa Macaya, netting once in a 9–0 win over Universitary SC. In the 1903–04 season, he briefly worked as a referee. He went on to win the 1903 Copa Barcelona and the 1904–05 Catalan championship.

On 1 May 1904, Ossó was a member of Barça's first-ever trip abroad, starting in a friendly match against Stade Olympien des Etudiants de Toulouse (SOET) in Toulouse, an excursion that was well documented in Los Deportes in a chronicle that was almost certainly written by Ossó. Accounts on his tally for Barça differ, with some sources stating that he scored 63 goals in 70 matches, while others state 68 goals in 72 matches, including 11 goals in 16 official matches.

=== Legend of the origin of Barça's shield ===
Traditionally, Ossó has been associated with the origin of the current blaugrana shield, which was created in a board meeting in 1901, when the secretary Ossó shouted: "Això és una olla de grills!" ("This is a pot of crickets!"), a phrase that inspired Gamper to draw a shield in the shape of a pot, later adding the azulgrana colors. This version of events is now considered a myth and it is believed that Barça's current coat of arms was actually drawn by Carles Comamala.

== Outside football ==
Like so many other pioneer sportsmen of his time, Ossó practiced multiple modalities, such as cycling, hunting, as well as sailing at Club Regatas de Barcelona, which he enjoyed alongside fellow Barça founder Josep Llobet. He might have known Alberto Serra, a former Regatas member and once a director at Los Deportes, although there is little evidence for it. He also practiced horse riding, hiking, tennis, and skating, being a member of Skating-Ring and Club Velocipédico.

== Death ==
Luis de Ossó died in Barcelona on 1 February 1931, at the age of 54, unmarried and without children.

== Honours ==
FC Barcelona

- Copa Macaya:
  - Champions: 1901–02
  - Runner-up: 1900–01
- Copa Barcelona:
  - Champions: 1903
- Catalan championship
  - Champions (1): 1904–05

FC Barcelona B

- Concurso Pergamí
  - Champions: 1902
- Medalla del Ayuntamiento
  - Champions: 1902
