= Arthur Leask =

Spanish football and tennis player

Personal information
- Full name: Arthur Leask Mace
- Date of birth: 20 June 1880
- Place of birth: Barcelona, Catalonia, Spain
- Date of death: 4 August 1967 (aged 87)
- Place of death: Barcelona, Catalonia, Spain
- Position: Forward

Senior career*
Years	Team	Apps	(Gls)
1901–1903	FC Barcelona	5	(3)
- * Club domestic league appearances and goals

Arthur Leask Mace (20 June 1880 – 4 August 1967) was a Spanish footballer who played as a forward for FC Barcelona between 1901 and 1903. He is best known for being the referee of Barça's first-ever game on 8 December 1899. In addition to football he was also an outstanding tennis player, winning the men's doubles in the first International Tennis Competition in Spain in 1903, partnering with Ernest Witty.

== Biography ==
Born in Barcelona in 1880, Leask first became interested in football and tennis during his university years, when he would regularly meet up with a group of English friends. In 1899, the same year in which the Swiss Joan Gamper founded FC Barcelona, several English families, the Witty (Arthur, Ernest), the Parsons (John and William), Shields (John and Thomas), Bartows, and himself, founded the Lawn Tennis Club Barcelona, which later become Real Club de Tenis Barcelona.

On 8 December 1899, he went down in history as the referee of FC Barcelona's first-ever game, played at the Velódromo de la Bonanova against the city's English colony known in Catalonia as Team Anglès. The game ended in a 1–0 victory for the English, courtesy of a goal from Arthur Witty.

Despite refereeing Barça first game in 1899, he only began playing for the club two years later, in 1901, being part of the team that won the club's first-ever piece of silverware, the 1901–02 Copa Macaya, netting a hat-tricks in the tournament's final matchday on 23 March 1902 to help his side to a 15–0 victory over Català FC. The Copa Macaya is now recognized as the first Catalan championship. Those three goals were the only ones he scored for the club.

Together with the likes of Udo Steinberg, Ernest Witty, and Alfonso Macaya, he was a member of the executive committee of the first international tennis tournament played in Spain in 1903. This Executive Committee, among other things, approved that the tournament would have five events: men's singles and pairs, mixed pairs, and men's singles and pairs with the advantages system. Arthur Leask was one of the great figures of the tournament, winning the men's doubles partnering with Ernest Witty.

== Honours ==
FC Barcelona

- Copa Macaya:
  - Champions: 1901–02
