= George Meyer (footballer) =

Spanish-Swiss football player

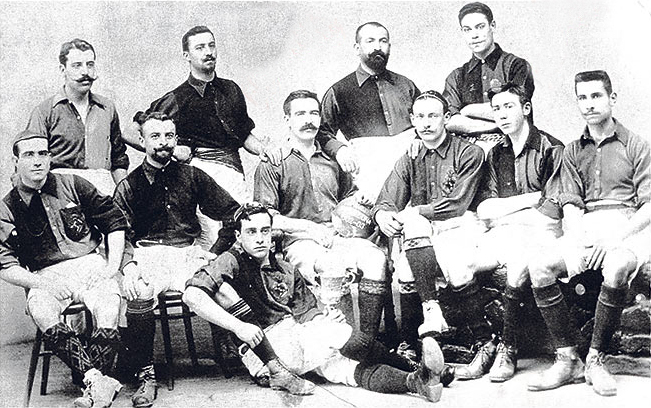
- Meyer (seated, third from the left, on the ground) in 1903

Personal information
- Birth name: George Meyer
- Date of birth: 1879
- Place of birth: Winterthur, Switzerland
- Date of death: Unknown
- Place of death: Barcelona, Spain
- Position(s): Defender and Midfielder

Senior career*
Years	Team	Apps	(Gls)
1894–1896	Excelsior Zürich		
1896–	FC Zürich		
1901–1904	FC Barcelona	35	(11)
1904–1905	RCD Espanyol		
- *Club domestic league appearances and goals

George Meyer was a Swiss-born footballer who played as a defender and midfielder for Spanish club FC Barcelona and RCD Espanyol in the early 1900s. He was regarded as the best player of Barcelona's early years, playing a pivotal role in the club's first-ever piece of silverware, the 1901–02 Copa Macaya. He was also the vice president of the club and a referee.

== Biography ==
Meyer was born in 1879 in Winterthur, Switzerland, and he began his football career in 1894, aged 15, at Excelsior Zürich, where he played for two years until 1896, when he moved to FC Zürich, becoming its second captain in 1898. Joan Gamper also played for both of those teams roughly at the same time, although it remains unclear if Meyer met him during those days or later at Barcelona. He also practiced other sports in Switzerland, excelling in skating.

Meyer moved to Barcelona in 1901 under unknown circumstances since he was never registered at the Swiss Consulate in Barcelona. He soon joined FC Barcelona, with whom he played for three years until 1904, netting 11 goals in 35 games, and winning the 1901–02 Copa Macaya and the Copa Barcelona in 1903, the former being the very first official title of the club. He was also the club's vice-president in the 1903–04 season. He was a personal friend of Joan Gamper and Walter Wild, the fundamental head behind Barcelona's foundation and the club's first-ever president, respectively.

In 1902, Meyer was a member of the historic Barcelona side that also included Gamper, Udo Steinberg, Alfonso Albéniz, the Morris brothers (Enrique and Samuel) and Arthur Witty, which participated in the Copa de la Coronación (predecessor of Copa del Rey), starting in the final as a defender, conceding two goals in a 1–2 loss to Club Vizcaya.

In 1904, Meyer had certain differences with Gamper that led to his departure for RCD Espanyol, where he played the 1904–05 season before retiring. He had a glass eye that fall to the ground in several matches.

The date and circumstances of his death are unknown.

== Honours ==
FC Barcelona

- Copa Macaya:
  - Champions: 1901–02
- Copa de la Coronación:
  - Runner-up: 1902
