= Los Deportes =

Sports magazine in Spain (1897–1910)

- Editor: Narciso Masferrer Sala
- Categories: Sports magazine
- Frequency: Biweekly
- Founder: Narciso Masferrer Sala
- Founded: 1897
- First issue: 1 November 1897
- Final issue Number: 15 July 1910; 546
- Country: Kingdom of Spain
- Based in: Barcelona
- Language: Spanish
- ISSN: 2604-0581

Los Deportes (Spanish: The Sports) was a biweekly sports magazine which was published in Barcelona, Spain, between 1897 and 1910. The magazine was one of the early sports publications in the country which played a significant role in the establishment of the sports journalism. Its subtitle was Revista Española ilustrada de automovilismo, ciclismo, aviación y demás deportes, turismo, educación (Spanish: Illustrated Spanish magazine on motoring, cycling, aviation and other sports, tourism, education).

== History and profile ==
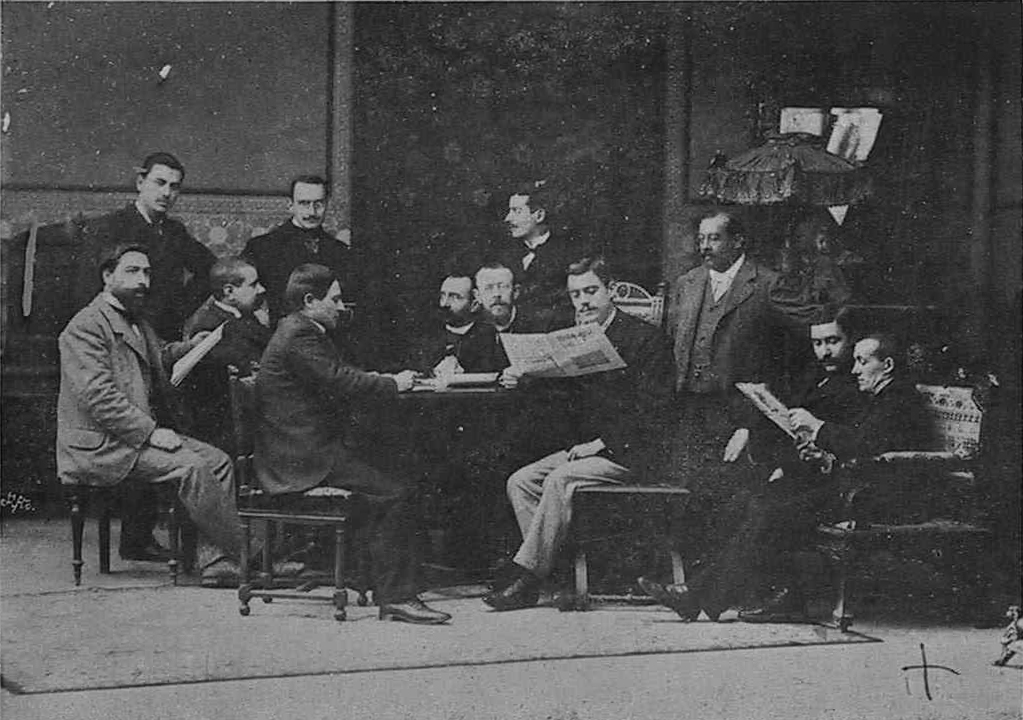
Editorial staff of Los Deportes

Los Deportes was first published in Barcelona on 1 November 1897. It was the official media outlet of Aero-Club de Cataluña, Real Asociación de Cazadores de Barcelona and Catalan Federation of Football Clubs. From June 1898 the magazine also became the official organ of the Spanish Gymnastic Society. It came out biweekly and covered numerous sports activities, including gymnastics, cycling, roller skating, rowing, sailing, fencing, hunting, ball game, lawn tennis, motoring and football. The other sections of the magazine were entertainment, bullfighting, concerts, musical theatre, drama and short stories. The first column on football was published on 24 December 1899.

Narciso Masferrer Sala was both the founder and director of the magazine. Regular contributors were David Ferrer and Elias Juncosa. Alberto Serra contributed to the football-related articles in Los Deportes introducing the first football chronicles. Antonio Viada published articles in the magazine about the adoption of foreign football terms between 1897 and 1910. Another Barcelona-based sports publication Barcelona Sport merged with Los Deportes in 1899.

Los Deportes enjoyed higher levels of circulation. The magazine folded on 15 July 1910 after the publication of the issue 546.
