= Alfonso Albéniz =

Spanish footballer and diplomat

Personal information
- Full name: Alfonso Albéniz Jordana
- Date of birth: 11 September 1885
- Place of birth: Tiana, Catalonia, Spain
- Date of death: 27 September 1941 (aged 56)
- Place of death: Estoril, Portugal
- Position: Midfielder

Senior career*
Years	Team	Apps	(Gls)
1901–1902	FC Barcelona		
	Moderno FC	1	(0)
1912	Madrid FC	3	(0)
1915–1918	Stadium de Madrid		
1st president of the National Committee of Referees
In office 1922–1923
Succeeded by	Carlos Dieste
7th president of the National Committee of Referees
In office 1928–1929
Preceded by	Julián Ruete
Succeeded by	Antonio de Cárcer
- * Club domestic league appearances and goals

Alfonso Albéniz Jordana (11 September 1885 – 27 September 1941 (Note: Albéniz was previously believed to have been born in Barcelona on 1 January 1886, a mistake that has persisted through time.)) was a Spanish footballer and referee, as well as a renowned chemical engineer, lecturer and later a diplomat. He is best known for being the first-ever player to play for both FC Barcelona and Real Madrid, which he achieved when he moved out from Catalonia to the Spanish capital for study purposes.

In addition to football, he also practiced cricket, tennis, cycling, and was an outstanding rugby player in France. He was one of the founders of both the College of Referees of the Center in 1914, the first college for such in Spain, and the National Committee of Referees in 1922, serving as its second and first president respectively.

== Early life ==
Alfonso Albéniz Jordana was born on 11 September 1885, as the firstborn of the marriage formed by the famous composer and pianist Isaac Albéniz and Rosa Jordana Lagarriga, daughter of the former mayor of the Gràcia district and a former student of Isaac. He was born in Tiana, Catalonia, a town in the east of the Province of Barcelona where his parents had their summer residence. He had an older sister, Enriqueta, who died in its infancy in 1886, as well as a younger sister, Laura (1890–1944), who went on to become a renowned illustrator in the arts of drawing and painting.

He was introduced to football in London, where the Albéniz family settled due to the performances of his father, who on numerous occasions took them to Paris, where Alfonso came into contact with rugby, becoming an outstanding rugby player. While still living in Tiana, Albéniz fell in love with a neighbor, Carme Reventós, with whom he became engaged. However, at that time, his parents lived in Paris and the summer romance, which led to several love letters between them, ended in nothing.

== Playing career ==
=== FC Barcelona ===
In 1901, his father got ill, so they returned to Barcelona, where Albéniz joined the ranks of FC Barcelona, becoming a member of the reserve/second team, which had been created by Luis de Ossó in 1900. At Barça, Albéniz played as a striker with a refined technique. Due to the absences of some of the first-team players, he made his debut with the first team in a friendly match against Club Español (now known as RCD Espanyol) on 1 December, at the age of 16 years and 80 days.

Albéniz then played his first official match for the club in the 1901–02 Copa Macaya, the forerunner of the Catalan championship, scoring the opening goal in a 4–2 win over Hispania AC on 6 January 1902, and in doing so at the age of 16 years and 115 days, he became both the youngest player and the youngest goalscorer in Barça's history. Albéniz held both records for just two years until they were broken in 1903 by Carles Comamala, who scored on his debut at 14 years and 219 days. Barcelona went on to win the Copa Macaya title, the club's first-ever piece of silverware, with Albéniz playing 5 matches and netting another goal for a total of two official goals with Barcelona.

=== 1902 Copa de la Coronación ===
When Barcelona participated in the very first national tournament played in Spain, the 1902 Copa de la Coronación, the club struggled with organizing the trip to Madrid since not all of its first team players could go, so they had to include members of the second team such as Luis Puelles, Josep Llobet, and Albéniz, who had already played several games with the main team. Together with Gamper, Arthur Witty and Udo Steinberg, he helped Barça reach the final on 15 May 1902, where they were beaten 2–1 by Bizcaya (a combination of players from Athletic Club and Bilbao Football Club).

In the semifinals on 13 May, Albéniz went down in history as one of the eleven footballers who played in the very first El Clásico in history, which ended in a 3–1 win to Barça, and in doing so at the age of 16 years and 242 days, he became the youngest player to participate in an El Clásico, a record that was broken in 1916 by Madrid's René Petit, aged 16 years and 149 days, but Albéniz remained the youngest Barça player to participate in an El Clásico for 120 years until Lamine Yamal broke this record in 2023, aged 16 years and 107 days. His youth did not go unnoticed by the chroniclers of the time, as the journalist Xavier G. Luque recalled in April 2011 in the pages of La Vanguardia: "Albéniz should not have been allowed to play such a violent and dangerous game due to being a minor".

=== Madrid FC ===
We have learned that Mr. Albéniz, former notable and enthusiastic Barcelona player, has joined Madrid Football Club, as well as other good players whose names we regrettably don't remember, but will quote in forthcoming match reports.

— Madrid newspaper

On 23 May 1902, just 10 days after featuring in FC Barcelona's line-up against Madrid FC, the press of the time announced the arrival of a 'Mr. Albéniz' from Barcelona who was to join Madrid FC. Even though Albéniz was only 16 years old and the transfer was simply for study purposes, he still went down in history as the first "turncoat" of their well-known rivalry. However, there are no references to his matches for Madrid until 1912, and for just that season, which suggests that he was either more focused on his studies and managerial work than in playing football, or that he simply preferred to play with Madrid's second team, just as he had done in Barcelona. On Christmas Day of 1902, Albéniz played a match for Moderno FC against Madrid FC at the Concurso de Bandas, which ended in a resounding 0–16 loss. On 28 August 1906, Albéniz played a friendly match with FC Barcelona, which was recorded as belonging to the Copa Salut, scoring once in a 4–2 victory over X Sporting Club, so it is possible that, detached from sporting life, he took advantage of brief moments to practice unofficially.

At the end of 1912, Albéniz featured in three friendly matches for Madrid FC, the first on 27 October against Club Español de Madrid (7–1) and the second on 1 November against Sporting Club de Irun on the occasion of the inauguration of the Campo de O'Donnell. In the latter match, which was recorded as belonging to the 'Excelsior Cup' and ended in a draw, Albéniz was injured in the first half and ended up retiring during the second. In his third and final match for the white club on 8 December, he helped Madrid to a 3–2 victory over a team called Instituto Cisneros in the semifinals of the Ciudad Lineal trophy, which was played in the context of a sports festival organized by the director of the Velodrome. It was around this time that Albéniz began his refereeing career as he then oversaw two matches of Madrid on 31 December and on 2 January 1913, both against Racing Club de France. A year later, on 4 January 1914, he refereed another friendly match in Madrid, this time of neighboring club Sociedad Gimnástica against FC Barcelona, ending in a 1–0 win in favour of his former club.

Local historians discovered years later that he appeared as a member of the Club Stadium of Madrid between 1915 and 1918, however, very little is known about his spell with the club.

== Refereeing career ==
Albéniz became a football referee in late 1912, being among those who formed the College of Referees of the Central Regional Federation, which was the first college for referees in Spain. Together with the likes of Manuel Prast, José Manuel Kindelán, and Julián Ruete, he was a member of the college's first constitution on 15 April 1914. Albéniz became its president a few weeks later, on 9 May, following the resignation of Prast.

On 2 July 1922, Albéniz co-founded the National Committee of Referees and was then elected as its first president, a position that he held for over a year until 1923, when he was replaced by Carlos Dieste. Albéniz returned to the presidency in 1928 (replacing Julián Ruete), becoming the first president of the first edition of the Spanish League in 1929. His second mandate lasted just over year, being replaced by Antonio de Cárcer.

== Later life and death ==
Albéniz married Rosalie de Sweert in France in the mid-1910s, with whom he had a daughter, Teresita. Like his sister Laura and his mother Rosa, Albéniz maintained a great friendship with the composer and pianist Manuel de Falla. He was a great-uncle of Alberto Ruiz-Gallardón (mayor of Madrid between 2003 and 2011), and grandfather of Cecilia María Ciganer, who was Nicolas Sarkozy's ex-wife.

Albéniz was also a director of the Chamartín club for eight years, from 1913 to 1921. A renowned chemical engineer, he also stood out as a lecturer, and at some point in the mid-1920s, he embarked on a career as a diplomat, becoming an ambassador for Spain in the League of Nations. Transferred in his last years of life to Estoril, Portugal, Albéniz died there in 1941, at the age of 56, due to complications with hypertension. His body was repatriated and buried in the Montjuïc Cemetery.

== Honours ==
FC Barcelona

- Copa Macaya
  - Champions: 1901–02
- Copa de la Coronación
  - Runner-up: 1902
