= 1901–02 Copa Macaya =

Tournament details
- Country: Catalonia
- Dates: 22 December 1901 – 12 March 1902
- Teams: 5

Final positions
- Champions: FC Barcelona (1st title)
- Runners-up: Hispania AC

Tournament statistics
- Top goal scorer: Joan Gamper (19 goals)

Awards
- Best player: Udo Steinberg

The 1901–02 Copa Macaya was the 2nd staging of the Copa Macaya. This tournament is best known for being the very first trophy won by the Spanish club FC Barcelona. The competition was held on the road between 22 December 1901 and ended on 12 March 1902.

== Overview ==
The previous edition of the competition had been won by Hispania AC, after beating Barcelona to the title by just two points. In the decisive game, Barcelona managed to score a winner against Hispania that would have forced a playoff for the title, but the goal was disallowed by the referee due to a supposed offside, a decision heavily protested by the Barça players, in vain. So in this second tournament, Barça was driven to claim the trophy and get some revenge along the way, and the first step they took was to sign Hispania's captain and best player at the tournament, Gustavo Green.

The second edition was contested by 5 teams: FC Barcelona, Hispania AC, Club Espanyol (now RCD Espanyol), Català SC and Universitary SC.

The pre-favorites to win the competition were the Barça team because at that time they had great international figures such as captain Joan Gamper, Arthur Witty and of course, Gustavo Green, plus a new signing Udo Steinberg, who also ended up being decisive. In the second edition of the Macaya Cup, the scenario of the previous season was repeated, with a clear superiority of Hispania and Barcelona over the rest, meaning that the title was decided in the direct confrontations between them once again. On 6 January 1902, in the first round, Barcelona beat Hispania 2–4, and when they met again in the penultimate matchday, Barça won again 1–0 thanks to a lonely goal from Steinberg, a victory that mathematically, secured them the title. In the eight games played in the tournament, Barça only conceded two goals, in the 2–4 win over Hispania, and scored a resounding 60 goals, 15 of which came on the final matchday in a 15–0 victory over Català SC, which was held at Velódromo de la Bonanova on 23 March 1902, with Steinberg netting 6 goals, and Gamper and Leask clutching a hat-trick each, thus sealing the club's first-ever piece of silverware in style.

== Table ==
Pos	Team	Pld	W	D	L	GF	GA	GD	Pts	Qualification or relegation
1	FC Barcelona	8	8	0	0	60	2	+58	16	Champion
2	Hispania AC	8	6	0	2	30	7	+23	12	
3	Espanyol	6	3	1	2	11	20	−9	7	
4	Universitary SC	8	1	2	5	8	33	−25	4	
5	Català SC	8	0	1	7	3	50	−47	1	

Source: RSSSF
Rules for classification: 1) points; 2) head-to-head points; 3) head-to-head goal difference; 4) goal difference; 5) number of goals scored; 6) fair-play points; 7) playoff match

(Note: All teams were from Barcelona, and all teams were invited to the 1902 Copa de la Coronación, but only FC Barcelona and Club Espanyol applied, the former reaching the final.)

=== Results ===
The list below only includes the matches played by Barcelona due to lack of information about the remaining games.

22 December 1901 Round 2	FC Barcelona	7 – 0	Club Español	Barcelona
	Steinberg; Gamper; García			Stadium: Camp de la carretera d'Horta; Referee: Samuel Morris

1 January 1902 Round 4	FC Barcelona	8 – 0	University SC	Barcelona
	Gamper; Steinberg; García			Stadium: Camp de la carretera d'Horta; Referee: Joaquim Carril

6 January 1902 Round 5	Hispania AC	2 – 4	FC Barcelona	Barcelona
	James Morris o.g.'		Albéniz; Gamper; Parsons	Stadium: Camp del carrer Muntaner; Attendance: 3.000; Referee: Ball

19 January 1902 Round 7	Club Español	0 – 4	FC Barcelona	Barcelona
			Gamper; García; Steinberg	Stadium: Camp de las Arenas; Referee: A. J. Smart

2 February 1902 Round 9	University SC	0 – 9	FC Barcelona	Barcelona
			Gamper; Steinberg d'Ossó; Vinyas	Stadium: Camp de l'Hotel Casanovas; Referee: Quintana

16 February 1902 Round 10	FC Barcelona	12 – 0	Català FC	Barcelona
	Widerkehr; Gamper; Steinberg; Albéniz ? o.g.' o.g.'			Stadium: Camp de la carretera d'Horta; Referee: King

9 March 1902 Round 12	FC Barcelona	1 – 0	Hispania AC	Barcelona
15:30	Steinberg			Stadium: Camp de la carretera d'Horta; Attendance: 5.500; Referee: Parck

23 March 1902 Round 14	Català FC	0 – 15	FC Barcelona	Barcelona
			Steinberg; Gamper; Leask; Parsons; Quirante	Stadium: Velódromo de la Bonanova; Referee: Gmelin

== Statistics ==
=== Top Scorers ===
Rank	Player	Team	Goals
1	Joan Gamper	FC Barcelona	19
2	Udo Steinberg	FC Barcelona	17
3	Paul Widerkehr	FC Barcelona	6
4	Joaquín García	FC Barcelona	5
5	John Parsons	FC Barcelona	3
6	Arthur Leask	FC Barcelona	3

== See also ==
- Catalan football championship
- 1902 Copa de la Coronación
- 1901–02 FC Barcelona season
