= Royal Spanish Gymnastics Federation =

Football association in Madrid

Real Federación Española de Gimnasia
- Full name: Royal Spanish Gymnastics Federation
- Founded: 26 September 1899
- Headquarters: Calle de Ferraz, 16. 7º right - 28008 - Madrid
- President: (Spain) Jesús Carballo
- Website: www.rfegimnasia.es

The Royal Spanish Gymnastics Federation (Spanish: Real Federación Española de Gimnasia, RFEG) is the highest national gymnastics body in Spain. Its headquarters are in Madrid and its current president is Jesús Carballo. Founded by Narciso Masferrer in 1899 as the Spanish Gymnastic Federation, it is the second oldest Federation in Spain, behind the cycling one. The federation was one of the most important entities in the amateur beginnings of Football in Spain because it acted as the Spanish Football Federation until 1904.

It is made up of 19 regional federations and is represented in Spain by the International Gymnastics Federation (FIG) and the European Gymnastics (UEG). The disciplines of gymnastics that fall within the RFEG are artistic gymnastics, rhythmic gymnastics, trampoline Gymnastics, and acrobatic gymnastics. The most important competitions that it organizes are the Spanish Rhythmic Gymnastics Championships, and the Spanish Rhythmic Gymnastics Championship. In 2018 he co-organized the 2018 Rhythmic Gymnastics European Championships in Guadalajara.

In Spain, gymnastics (in all its modalities) is the most practiced sport, being developed by 34.6% of sports practitioners according to the Survey of Sports Habits 2010 of the CSD. The most practiced competitive gymnastics discipline in Spain is rhythmic gymnastics, being the 4th most practiced sports discipline among girls and adolescents, only surpassed by swimming, basketball and football, according to the Sports Habits Survey of the School Population (2011), prepared by the CSD.

== Disciplines and teams ==
1. Artistic Gymnastics: Men's Artistic Gymnastics National Team and Women's Artistic Gymnastics National Team
2. Rhythmic gymnastics: National rhythmic gymnastics team
3. Trampoline Gymnastics: National Trampoline Gymnastics Team
4. Aerobic gymnastics: National aerobic gymnastics team
5. Acrobatic gymnastics: National acrobatic gymnastics team

== History ==
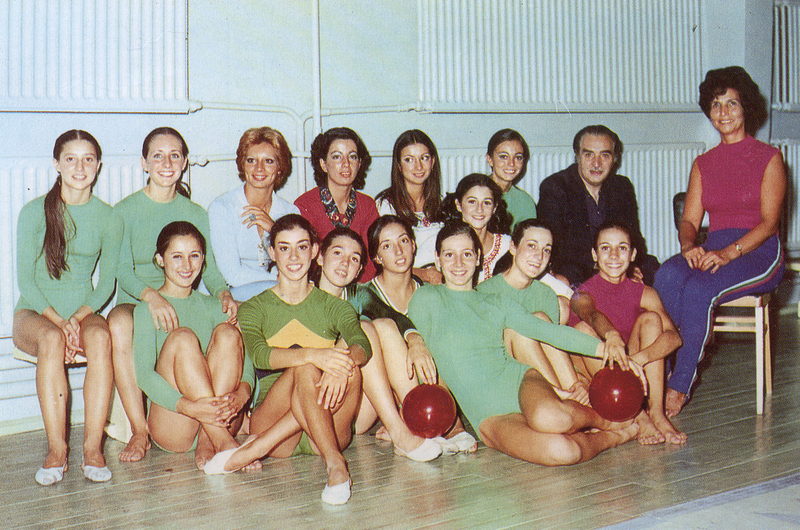
The first national rhythmic gymnastics team in Spain (1975).

The federation's history began on 1 March 1898, when Narciso Masferrer published an appeal to all Spanish athletes to create a "Confederation of Spanish Gymnastic Societies" in the Barcelona newspaper Los Deportes, which had also been created by him in 1897. A positive response resulted in a meeting in Madrid on 7 June 1898 and Federación Española de Gimnasia (Spanish Gymnastic Federation) was born and the first Executive Committee was appointed. The first president of the Federation was José Canalejas. The founders included the Gymnastic of Tarragona, the Gymnasium of Vigo, the Gymnastic Club of Cartagena, the Catalan Society of Gymnastics and the Gymnastic Society of Orense. Shortly after the Spanish Gymnastic Society joined, which had shown initial reluctance to the initiative.

On 26 September 1899, the Spanish Gymnastic Federation was officially founded within the framework of its first General Assembly, held in Madrid. The Spanish Federation of Gymnastics is therefore the second oldest Spanish sports federation after the cycling one. The Spanish Gymnastic Federation would hold three more General Assemblies: in 1900 in Barcelona, in 1901 in Zaragoza and in 1902 again in Barcelona. In addition, he organized the so-called Federal Holidays, which included competitions in various sports. On 20 March 1902, the Federation was declared a "True Public Utility Society" by the Government of Spain. The sports competitions organized by the Federation in Barcelona during La Mercè in September 1902, which included a football tournament, is considered by some authors to be the first great exhibition of Spanish sports. From that year on, however, the Federation began its decline, and around 1904 this society seems to disappear. In 1906, Narciso Masferrer, among other people, lamented the disappearance of the Spanish Gymnastic Federation in the pages of El Mundo Deportivo.

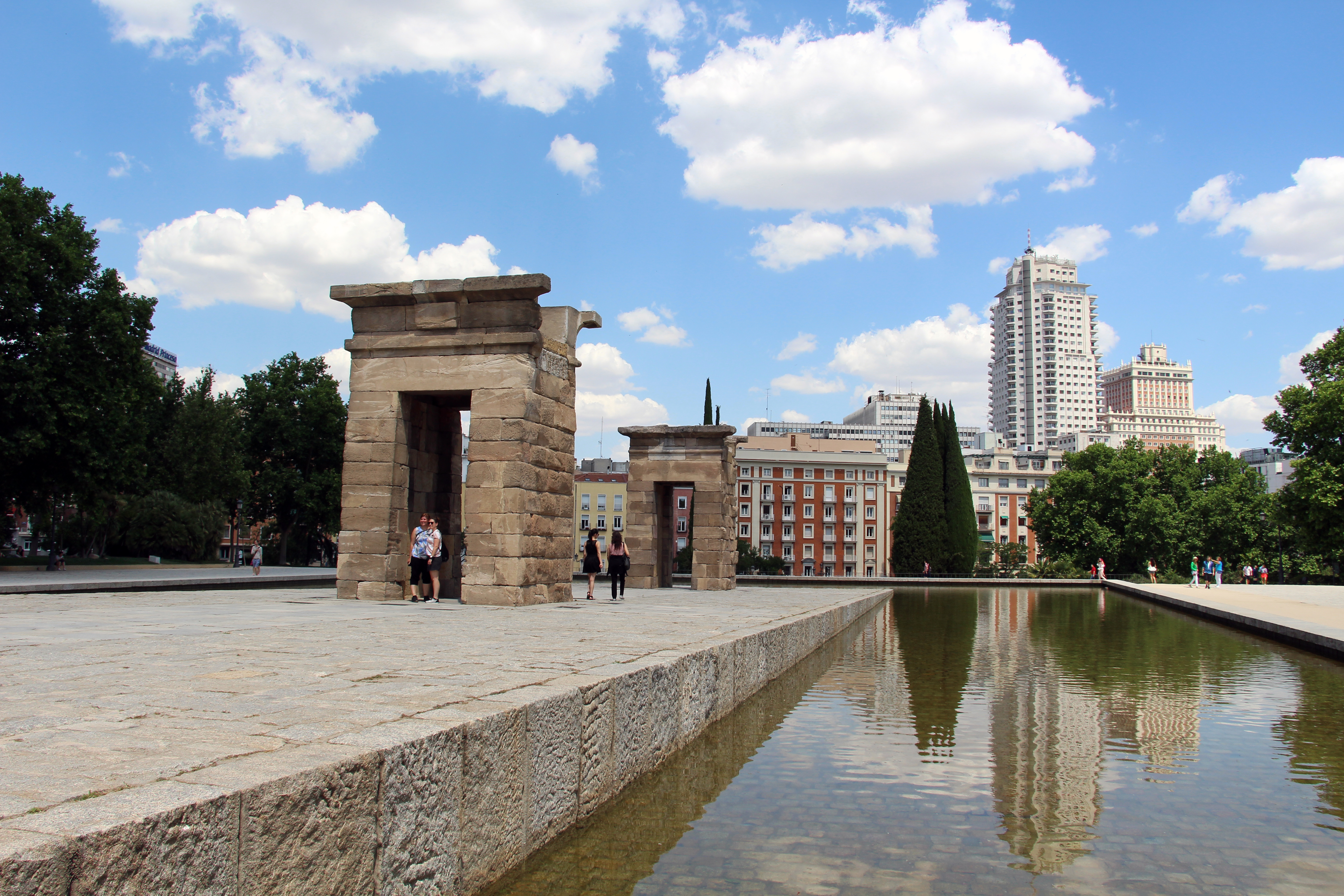
RFEG headquarters (in the background), in front of the Temple of Debod.

In June 1932, at the initiative of the Spanish Gymnastic Society, the current Spanish Federation of Gymnastics was established, although it continued to retain the name of Spanish Gymnastic Federation or Spanish Gymnastic Confederation for some years. In 1933 he joined the International Gymnastics Federation. In 1941 it organized the first Spanish Artistic Gymnastics Championship for men, while in 1953 the first for women was held. As of 1966, the Spanish Federation of Gymnastics was split from the weight.

In 1974, the Spanish Gymnastics Federation created the national rhythmic gymnastics team of Spain and in 1975 both the first Spanish Individual and Group Rhythmic Gymnastics Championships were organized, as well as the 1975 World Rhythmic Gymnastics Championships in Madrid, the first Rhythmic Gymnastics World Championships held in Spain. In 1999, the Royal Spanish Gymnastics Federation celebrated its first centenary through various events.

== Presidents ==
First Phase

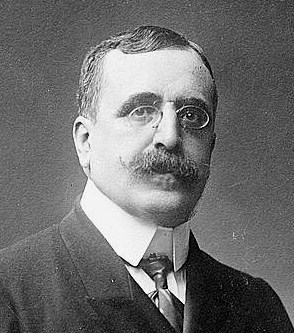
José Canalejas, the first president of the federation.

- José Canalejas (1898 - 1900). The first president of the Gymnastic Federation. Born in Ferrol in 1854, he was a lawyer and liberal politician who became President of the Government from 1910 until his assassination in 1912.
- Rafael Rodríguez Méndez (1900 - 1902). Born in Granada in 1845 and died in 1919, he was a doctor and politician, being rector of the University of Barcelona from 1902 to 1905.
- Joaquín Bonet y Amigó (1902 - 1904 approx.). Born in Barcelona in 1852. He was an obstetrician, professor, politician and financier, being rector of the University of Barcelona from 1905 to 1913 and Senate of Spain from 1901 until his death in 1913.

Second Phase

- César Juarros y Ortega (1933 - Outbreak of the Spanish Civil War). First president of the Spanish Gymnastic Confederation after its revival in 1932. Under his mandate, in 1933, he joined the International Gymnastics Federation. Born in Madrid in 1879 and died in 1942, he was a psychiatrist, educational psychologist, man of letters, and since 1929 a member of the Royal National Academy of Medicine.
- Joaquín Vierna Belando (1939 - 1951). First president of the Spanish Gymnastic Confederation after the Civil War. He was born in Galicia and died on 27 February 1983. General of the Infantry, he was the founder of the first polo team in La Coruña and a Physical Education teacher at the Toledo School.
- Ramón García Ráez (1951 - 1957). Born on 14 May 1904 and died on 26 March 1980. Brigadier General of the Marine Corps. He was a swimming champion in the Navy and a Physical Education teacher at the Toledo School. In the Federation, his secretary was Augusto Brunet.
- Carlos Gutiérrez Salgado (1957 - 1966). Born in Madrid on 16 December 1919. He was the champion of Spain in gymnastics in 1942, 1945 and 1946, graduated in Physical Education and Sports, and Doctor of Medicine and Surgery. He was co-founder and vice-president of the Spanish Federation of Sports Medicine (1950), doctor-director of the General Moscardó Gymnasium in Madrid (1952 - 1966), and co-founder and chief deputy director of studies of the Facultad de Ciencias de la Actividad Física y del Deporte (1966 - 1977) and director of the same (1977 - 1979). Royal Order of Sports Merit (2011).

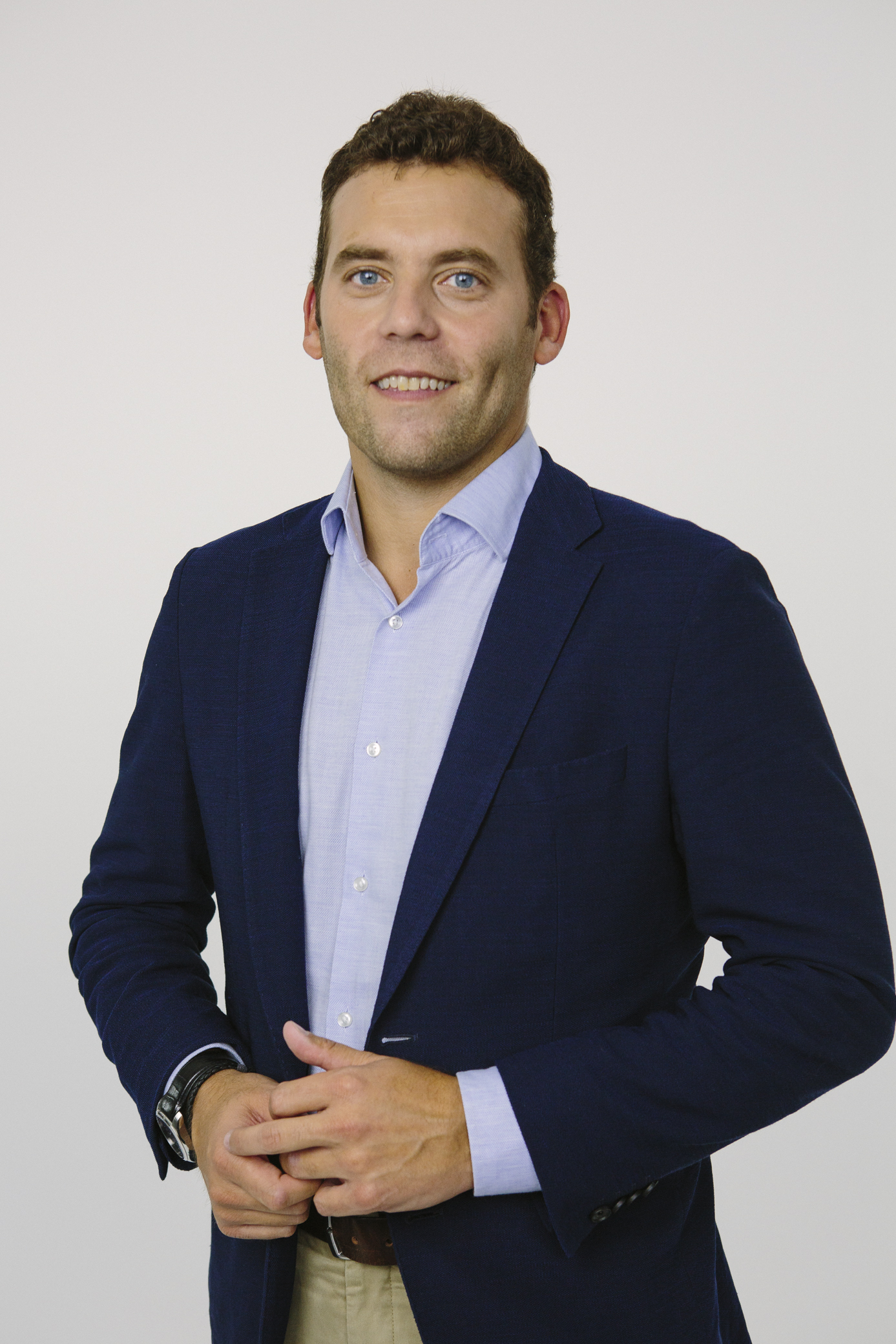
Jesús Carballo, the current president of the Federation.

- Félix Fernández Fernández (1966 - 1982). Born in Madrid and industrial. Member of the Executive Committee of the International Federation of Gymnastics and since 1984 Honorary Member of the same. He received the 1981 Garcia Doctor Cup. He died on July 17, 1994, at the age of 78.
- Ángel Gómez Roldán (1982 - 1984). He was born on 2 May 1935. Administrative, he became president of the Spanish Federation after five years of the Castilian Federation. Executive member of the European Gymnastics.
- Carmen Algora Sanjuan (1984 - 1991).
- Jesús Orozco Nestares (1991 - 1993). He was also named a member of the Executive Committee of the International Gymnastics Federation in 1992. In the RFEG his secretary was Jesús Méndez.
- Jesús Méndez Díaz (1994 - 1998).
- Ángel Bacigalupi Cuervo (1998 - 2000).
- Antonio Esteban Cerdán (2001 - 2010).
- Jesús Carballo (2010 - actualidad). Born in Madrid in 1976, he was a two-time world champion in artistic gymnastics on the fixed bar. Gold Royal Order of Sports Merit (2000). He is the son of former national coach Jesús Carballo.

== Awards, recognitions and distinctions ==
List of awards that the Spanish Federation of Gymnastics has received since its foundation.

- General Moscardó Trophy of 1957 for the best Spanish sports federation, awarded by the National Delegation of Physical Education and Sports (1958).
- (Spain) 1978 Federations Trophy for the best Spanish sports federation, awarded by the Consejo Superior de Deportes (1979)
- Olympic Plate for Sports Merit, awarded by the Spanish Olympic Committee (2009)

== Autonomous federations ==
The RFEG consists of 19 federations at the regional level.

1. (Andalusia) Andalusian Gymnastics Federation
2. (Aragon) Aragonese Federation of Gymnastics
3. (Asturias) Asturian Federation of Gymnastics
4. (Canary Islands) Canarian Gymnastics Federation
5. (Cantabria) Cantabrian Federation of Gymnastics
6. (Catalonia) Catalan Gymnastics Federation
7. (Castilla–La Mancha) Castile-La Mancha Federation of Gymnastics
8. (Castile and León) Gymnastics Federation of Castile and Leon
9. Ceuta Gymnastics Federation
10. Gymnastics Federation of the Balearic Islands
11. Extremadura Gymnastics Federation
12. (Galicia (Spain)) Galician Federation of Gymnastics
13. (Community of Madrid) Madrid Gymnastics Federation
14. Melilla Gymnastics Federation
15. (Region of Murcia) Murcian Federation of Gymnastics
16. (Navarre) Navarra Federation of Gymnastics
17. (La Rioja) Rioja Gymnastics Federation
18. (Valencian Community) Valencian Federation of Gymnastics
19. (Basque Country (autonomous community)) Basque Federation of Gymnastics

== See also ==
- International Gymnastics Federation
- European Gymnastics
- Sport in Spain
