= Copa Macaya =

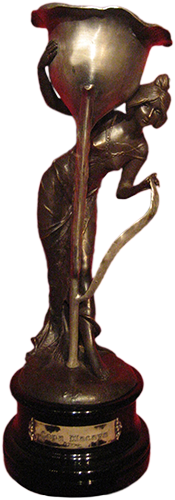
- Organiser(s): Hispania Athletic Club
- Founded: 20 January 1901
- Abolished: 1903; 122 years ago
- Region: Catalonia
- Related competitions: Catalan football championship
- Last champions: Club Espanyol (1907)
- Most championships: Hispania AC; FC Barcelona; Club Espanyol (1 title)

The Hispania Athletic Club Tournament–Alfonso Macaya Cup, popularly known as the Copa Macaya, was a football competition contested by clubs from Catalonia which ran from 1900 until 1903, disappearing at the same time of its organizers, Hispania AC, who won the first edition in 1901. Initially, the championship was open to all Spanish clubs, thus some historians consider this cup to be the first national championship in Spain, as well as the predecessor and forerunner for the Catalan football championship which began in 1903. Until that point, the teams founded at the end of 1899 and during 1900 had been limited to playing friendly games only. It was one of the first football championships played on the Iberian Peninsula, after Taça D. Carlos I in Portugal (1894) and the Merchants Cup in Gibraltar (1895).

It was named in honor of the donator of the trophy, Alfonso Macaya, ideologue and promoter of the championship. In 1903, the third and last edition of the Copa Macaya organized by Hispania was held simultaneously with the Copa Barcelona organized by FC Barcelona.

Notable figures of this tournament are Joan Gamper, Arthur Witty, Samuel Morris, Gustavo Green and Udo Steinberg.

== History ==
=== Origins ===
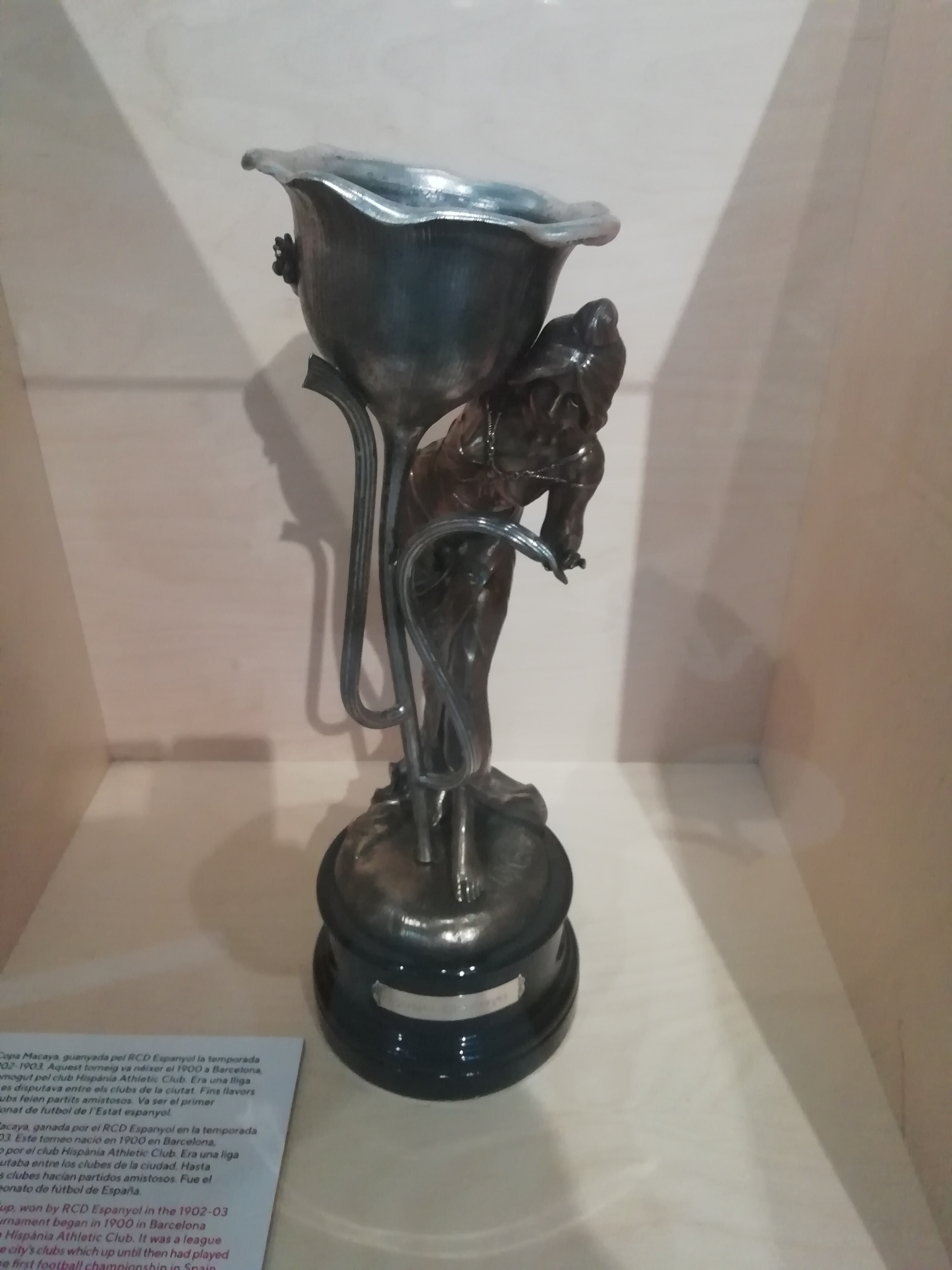
The Copa Macaya trophy.

In December 1900, Alfonso Macaya, the then honorary president of Hispania AC, began to develop the idea of a football championship contested in a league format between the different clubs that had been created in Spain, with registration being open to all national clubs throughout the country. The championship was not closed geographically, but was open to any club, regardless of its origin. In fact, a special offer is made to Madrid and Balearic clubs, thus it can be considered the first national championship. In the end, however, only six Catalan teams participated, of which only one was a non-Barcelona team, the Tarragona Club, given the resignations of those from Madrid and Mallorca. The rest of the participants, in addition to Tarragona and Hispania itself, were FC Barcelona, Sociedad Franco-Española, SD Santanach and Club Espanyol (currently RCD Espanyol), with the latter two withdrawing from the tournament.

In addition to the new competitive format, and to create greater motivation, Alfonso Macaya himself offers a trophy (the "Copa Macaya") for the winner of the tournament, a magnificent silver Cup. Macaya commissioned the Cup from a London master goldsmith, but no one knew anything about it, nor did it appear during the first championship. Only a few days before the final match, the Cup was publicly presented, causing a certain disappointment due to its small size and for not being made of gold, but silver. This Cup was not for the winner of the first edition, however, but for whoever won it three times, a condition to take it as their property, which was very common at the time. That is why a second Cup was presented, more traditional and without any artistic value, for the winner of each edition.

=== Copa Macaya I ===
Hispania AC became the first Catalan champions after winning the inaugural Copa Macaya after narrowly beating FC Barcelona. The title was only decided on the last matchday of the tournament, held on 14 April 1901 at the Muntaner, in a game where Barcelona needed to defeat Hispania to at least force a playoff, but instead they drew at 1 after the referee controversially disallowed Barça's second goal, thus giving the hosts the only championship of its short history. The inaugural Copa Macaya was surrounded by protests against the competition committee, as both Espanyol and Barça claimed that the refereeing had favored the hosts throughout the tournament. Gustavo Green was Hispania's captain and best player at the tournament, playing a pivotal role in helping his side become the very first Spanish club to win an official title. On the other hand, Joan Gamper was Barcelona's captain and their best player at the tournament, being its top scorer with 31 goals.

=== Copa Macaya II ===
The following season, 1901–02, saw FC Barcelona lift the Copa Macaya trophy, their first-ever piece of silverware. In this edition, the rivalry between Hispania and FC Barcelona was repeated, but on this occasion, FC Barcelona is tremendously superior to all its rivals, easily prevailing in all matches and winning the tournament. In the eight games played in the tournament, Barça only conceded two goals, in a 2–4 win over Hispania on 6 January 1902, and scored a resounding 60 goals, 15 of which came on the final matchday in a 15–0 victory over Català SC on 23 March 1902, with Udo Steinberg netting 6 goals, and Joan Gamper and Arthur Leask clutching a hat-trick each.

=== Copa Macaya III ===
By the end of 1902, Hispania was already in decline, but it still has the strength and courage to organize the third edition of its championship. Alfonso Macaya distances himself from the organization of the tournament, which falls to Shields. Among the contenders remain the three most important, the organizer Hispania AC, FC Barcelona and Espanyol. The table is completed with two smaller clubs, SC Universitari, which already competed in the previous edition, and FC Internacional. The tournament opens on 30 November 1902 with a clash between the hosts and the champions, which the latter wins 2–0, however, the result was declared invalid due to Barça fielding an ineligible player, and their reaction was to withdraw from the tournament as the club considered the decision totally unfounded and unfair, and decided to organize a tournament of their own, called Copa Barcelona.

So in the 1902–03 season, two rival competitions were organized (similar to the 1910 and 1913 editions of the Copa del Rey), and while Club Espanyol won the third and last edition of the Copa Macaya after beating 3–1 Hispania AC in a play-off on 12 April 1903, Barcelona won the Copa Barcelona after a tough fight with Club Español, with whom he drew at two both home and away, hedging out in the end by just two points. Remarkably, Gustavo Green won all three editions of the Copa Macaya with three different clubs (Hispania, Barça and Español).

=== Madrid FC requests to participate ===
In 1903, Madrid FC requested the organizers to participate in the Copa Barcelona, but the request was made too late to be accepted as the tournament was about to begin, making it impossible for them to join. As an alternative, Madrid FC was offered to play a match against the winner at the end of the competition to compete for a prize. It was not necessary to wait for the end of the championship, because Club Español emerged as the winners at the end of February, so Madrid FC, with seven players, traveled to Barcelona to face them, with the game ending in a 0–0 draw. Another of the reasons for the trip of the whites to Barcelona was to further strengthen the ties of friendship between them and the Spanish Gymnastic Federation, as well as the Catalan clubs, especially with Español and FC Barcelona, meaning that the rivalry between them had not yet arisen.

=== The championship for the ownership of the Cup ===
With the decline of the Hispania AC at the end of 1903, it was evident that the history of the Copa Macaya was coming to an end, thus sparking the debate of who was entitled to take the Cup as its own, since a different team won in each edition (Hispania AC, FC Barcelona and Español). To resolve the situation, a championship between the previous three champions, Hispania AC, FC Barcelona and Club Español, was scheduled for November 1903, facing-off for the right to keep the trophy. However, when November came, Hispania had already disappeared, and since Club Español had won all the games of that season against Barcelona, the trophy was awarded to Club Español.

From 1903 to 04 onwards, the Catalan championship began to be organized by the Catalan Football Federation and it became known as the Campionat de Catalunya.

== Results ==
=== 1900–01 Standings ===
Pos	Team	Pld	W	D	L	GF	GA	GD	Pts	Qualification or relegation
1	Hispania AC	8	7	1	0	39	2	+37	15	Champion
2	FC Barcelona	8	6	1	1	51	4	+47	13	
3	Espanyol (Note: Espanyol retired after the fourth game. All their opponents until the end of the tournament were awarded with a victory.)	8	3	0	5	6	6	0	6	
4	Club Tarragona (Note: Tarragona didn't play at Franco-Española, awarded with a victory.)	8	2	0	6	0	30	−30	4	
5	Franco-Española (Note: Franco-Española didn't play at Tarragona, awarded with a victory.)	8	1	0	7	0	54	−54	2	
6	Santanach (WD) (Note: Santanach withdrew before the tournament.)	0	0	0	0	0	0	0	0	

Source: Copa
Rules for classification: 1) points; 2) head-to-head points; 3) head-to-head goal difference; 4) goal difference; 5) number of goals scored; 6) fair-play points; 7) playoff match

=== 1901–02 Standings ===
Pos	Team	Pld	W	D	L	GF	GA	GD	Pts	Qualification or relegation
1	FC Barcelona	8	8	0	0	60	2	+58	16	Champion
2	Hispania AC	8	6	0	2	30	7	+23	12	
3	Espanyol	6	3	1	2	11	20	−9	7	
4	Universitary SC	8	1	2	5	8	33	−25	4	
5	Català SC	8	0	1	7	3	50	−47	1	

Source: RSSSF
Rules for classification: 1) points; 2) head-to-head points; 3) head-to-head goal difference; 4) goal difference; 5) number of goals scored; 6) fair-play points; 7) playoff match

=== 1902–03 Standings ===
Pos	Team	Pld	W	D	L	GF	GA	GD	Pts	Qualification or relegation
1	Club Espanyol	4	3	0	1	9	2	+7	6	Champion
2	Hispania AC	4	3	0	1	10	3	+7	6	
3	FC Internacional	4	0	0	4	1	15	−14	0	
4	FC Barcelona (WD)	0	0	0	0	0	0	0	0	
5	Universitary SC (WD)	0	0	0	0	0	0	0	0	

Source: RSSSF
Rules for classification: 1) points; 2) head-to-head points; 3) head-to-head goal difference; 4) goal difference; 5) number of goals scored; 6) fair-play points; 7) playoff match

==== Playoff ====
Club Espanyol and Hispania AC finished level on points, so a play-off had to be played to decide the winner.

12 April 1903

Club Espanyol	3–1	Hispania AC
Green; García	Report	Girvan

=== Copa Barcelona ===
Pos	Team	Pld	W	D	L	GF	GA	GD	Pts	Qualification or relegation
1	FC Barcelona	14	12	2	0	45	10	+35	26	Champion
2	Club Espanyol	14	11	2	1	32	7	+25	24	
3	Hispania AC	14	9	1	4	22	18	+4	19	
4	Català SC	14	7	1	6	25	25	0	15	
5	Irish FC	14	4	2	8	25	11	+14	10	
6	FC Internacional	14	3	3	8	5	16	−11	9	
7	Ibèria SC	14	4	0	10	7	20	−13	8	
8	Salut SC	14	0	1	13	2	46	−44	1	
9	Universitary SC (WD)	0	0	0	0	0	0	0	0	
10	X Sporting Club (WD)	0	0	0	0	0	0	0	0	

Source: RSSSF
Rules for classification: 1) points; 2) head-to-head points; 3) head-to-head goal difference; 4) goal difference; 5) number of goals scored; 6) fair-play points; 7) playoff match

== Statistics ==
=== Titles by club ===
Country	Winners	Runner-ups
(Catalonia) Hispania AC	1	2
(Catalonia) FC Barcelona	1	1
(Catalonia) Club Espanyol	1	1

== Records and statistics ==
=== Top scorers per tournament ===
Tournament	Name	Team	Goals
1901	(Switzerland) Joan Gamper	FC Barcelona	31
1902	(Switzerland) Joan Gamper	FC Barcelona	19
1903 (Macaya)	(Spain) Gustavo Green	Club Español	7
1903 (Barcelona)	(Switzerland) Joan Gamper	FC Barcelona	21

=== All-time top goalscorers ===
Rank	Name	Team	Goals	Tournament(s)
1	(Switzerland) Joan Gamper	FC Barcelona	71	1901 (31), 1902 (19) and 1903 (21)
2	(Germany) Udo Steinberg	FC Barcelona	24	1902 (17) and 1903 (7)
3	(Spain) Gustavo Green	FC Barcelona; Hispania AC; Club Español	17	1901 (9), 1902 (1) and 1903 (7)
4	(England) John Parsons	FC Barcelona	11	1901 (8), 1902 (3)
5	(Scotland) John Hamilton	Hispania AC	7	1901 (7)
5	(Spain) Luis de Ossó	FC Barcelona	7	1902 (1), 1903 (6)
7	(Switzerland) Paul Widerkehr	FC Barcelona	6	1902 (6)
8	(Scotland) Joseph Black	Hispania AC	5	1901 (5)
8	(Scotland) Alexander Black	FC Barcelona	5	1901 (5)

== Legacy ==
The Copa Macaya was the first football championship played on the Iberian Peninsula, and its success led to the organization of the first Catalan championship in 1903, and thus, the Copa Macaya has been officially accepted as the first Catalan Championships, which was the most important football competition in Catalonia in the first half of the 20th century.

== See also ==
- Catalan football championship
- 1902 Copa de la Coronación
