= Hispania AC 1–1 Barcelona (April 1901) =

Hispania AC v Barcelona
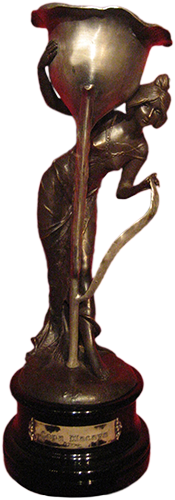
- The Copa Macaya trophy
- Event: Last round of 1900–01 Copa Macaya
Hispania AC	FC Barcelona
1	1
- Date: 14 April 1901
- Venue: Camp del carrer Muntaner, Barcelona
- Referee: William Mauchan
- Attendance: 4,000

The Hispania vs Barcelona football match that took place on 14 April 1901 at the Muntaner in Barcelona, Spain, was played during the last round of the first edition of the Copa Macaya. Hispania and Barcelona came into the match occupying the top two positions in the tournament, separated by just three points, and thus both teams could still claim the title.

It was one of the most important matches in the early history of Catalan football because it would decide the winner of the tournament and thus not only the first champions of Catalonia, but also the first team to win the very first official title in Spanish football, with Hispania only needing a draw to win it, which they achieved it by holding Barça to a 1–1 draw.

== Background ==
In December 1900, Alfonso Macaya, the then honorary president of Hispania AC, began to develop the idea of a football championship contested in a league format between the different clubs that had been created in Spain, but only six Catalan teams participated, of which only one was a non-Barcelona team, the Tarragona Club. The rest of the participants were Sociedad Franco-Española, SD Santanach and Club Espanyol (currently RCD Espanyol), with the latter withdrawing from the tournament due to the partiality of the referees in favor of the hosts Hispania.

On 20 January, the tournament began with a match between the two favorites Barcelona and Hispania, held at the former's home ground (a field in front of the Hotel Casanovas), but despite home ground advantage, it was Hispania who won with a 2–1 come back victory with two goals from their captain, Gustavo Green, but not without controversy, since the Barcelona fans, captained by Joan Gamper, considered the second goal illegal due to being an own goal. This result proved to be decisive in the outcome of the tournament since the rest of the participating teams basically played a "formality role", as Barcelona and Hispania beat them all with thrashings (both teams beat Franco 14–0 at home), thus the title was only decided when they met again, now at Hispania's home ground, on the last matchday on 14 April, with Hispania having 14 points against Barcelona's 12, thus Hispania only needed a draw to win the title while a victory to Barça would force the dispute of a tiebreaker match to definitively award the championship.

== Overview ==
The match took place on Sunday 14 April 1901 at the field in Muntaner in front of 4,000 spectators. Admission was free and there were plenty of curious friends of the town's football players. The game was refereed by an Englishmen William Mauchan, whose son Peter, started in the match for Barcelona. Interestingly, they were not the only family pair of Scottish roots present in this match since the Morris brothers, Samuel and Morris, both played for Hispania as a goalkeeper and a forward respectively, while the Black brothers, Joseph Black and Alexander Black found themselves playing against each other. Notably, Barça fielded five present and future presidents of the club, Walter Wild (1899–1901), Bartomeu Terradas (1901–1902), Arthur Witty (1903–1905), Joan Gamper (1908–09, 1910–13, 1917–19, 1921–23 and 1924–25), and Vicente Reig (1908). Chaperon and Kings acted as the linesman of Barcelona and Hispania, respectively.

As with the rest of the tournament, the final match was also highly controversial. It was noticeable at first glance how tiny the Hispania goals were, which caused some members of Barcelona to make sure of their measurement, finding the lack of 1.75 meters in width and a few centimeters in height, compared to the regulatory measures, for which the captain of Barcelona raised the corresponding protest to the referee and Committee, but later withdrew it at their direction in order not to promote discussions and disagreements and to be able to play the match. Some players from Tarragona and the Català FC and Español clubs suspended their rehearsal matches to attend this game, wearing blue and red ribbons in their buttonholes like those of Barcelona as a sign of sympathy for it. The game kick-off was made by the friendly sportsman Mr. Shields, president of the tournament's Committee, but the match itself was anything but friendly as it turned out to be rough and laborious on both sides. The extremely annoying wind that reigned throughout the day greatly damaged the match, as was rightly feared by those present, with the chronicles of the time stating that "the wind completely prevented the development of the clean and elegant game to which Hispania AC has accustomed us". When the teams changed fields at half-time, Hispania, now playing with the sun and wind in their favor, managed to dominate the game as proven by the fact that they achieved seven corners compared to the opponent's three.

In the first half, both teams scored once, with Hispania going ahead thanks to an own goal from an undetermined Barcelona player while Gamper equalized. In the second half, both sides fought ardently, with Hispania mainly trying to prevent the development of Gamper's game, which was constantly marked by two Hispania players, and sometimes by a few more, and thus, they managed to resist Barça's intense siege largely thanks to Sanmartín's marking of Gamper and their goalkeeper Samuel Morris, with the game ending in a 1–1 tie, which proved to be enough for Hispania to become the first Catalan champion in history.

However, Barça scored a second goal by John Parsons, also in the first half, which was disallowed by the referee Mauchan because, according to the referee, the ball had not gone completely in, thus not crossing the goal line, a decision that was heavily protested by the spectators belonging to several clubs, who maintained that it was perfectly valid as they had been placed behind the goal, while the Barcelona players moved to the center of the field to restart the game, being surprised to see that the goal had not been granted, but not protesting because they knew that the referee's ruling was unappealable even if it was mistaken. Despite this, Mauchan was highly congratulated by the sensible part of the audience, as well as Hispania's Green and Samuel Morris, "the first for his skillful work and the second for not having denied the reputation of being insurmountable that preceded it". The chronicles of the time also highlighted the performance of Miguel Sanmartín due to "his confidence and for the masterful way he marked Mr. Gamper, an unquestionably good player at running the ball, for which he won applause".

== Final details ==
14 April 1901
1900–01 Copa Macaya

(Spain) Hispania AC	1 – 1	(Spain) FC Barcelona
?? o.g.'	Report1	Gamper

Camp del carrer Muntaner, Barcelona, Spain
Attendance: 4,000
Referee: William Mauchan

GK	1	(Philippines) Samuel Morris
DF	2	(Scotland) John Hamilton
DF	3	(Scotland) Willie Gold
MF	4	(Spain) Josep Ortiz
MF	5	(Spain) Miguel Sanmartín
MF	6	(Spain) G. Ríos
FW	7	(Philippines) Enrique Morris
FW	8	(Spain) Fermín Lomba
FW	9	(Spain) Gustavo Green (C)
FW	10	(Spain) Alejandro Leigh
FW	11	(Scotland) Joseph Black

GK	1	(Spain) Vicente Reig
DF	2	(Scotland) George Girvan
DF	3	(Scotland) Peter Mauchan
MF	4	(Switzerland) Walter Wild
MF	5	(Spain) Bartomeu Terradas
MF	6	(Spain) Miguel Valdés
FW	7	(Scotland) Alexander Black
FW	8	(Spain) Josep Llobet
FW	9	(Switzerland) Joan Gamper
FW	10	(England) Arthur Witty (C)
FW	11	(England) John Parsons

== Legacy ==
Hispania AC won the tournament and celebrated the cup; however, it was necessary to win the championship three times to take definitive ownership of the cup. The two following editions were won by Barcelona, their first-ever piece of silverware, and by Club Español, but the decline of Hispania at the end of 1903 and thus the upcoming end of the Copa Macaya sparked the debate of who was entitled to take the Cup as its own, since a different team won in each edition. To resolve the situation, a championship between the previous three champions was scheduled for November 1903, but by then, Hispania had already disappeared, and since Club Español had won all the games of that season against Barcelona, the trophy was awarded to Club Español.

== See also ==
- Barcelona 1–1 Atlético Madrid (May 2014)
