= 1900–01 FC Barcelona season =

2nd season in existence of FC Barcelona

FC Barcelona
1900–01 season
- President: Walter Wild; Bartomeu Terradas
- Copa Macaya: Second
- Top goalscorer: League: No league All: Joan Gamper (39 goals)
Home colours	Away colours

The 1900–01 season was the second season for FC Barcelona.

== Events ==
On 23 September, Barcelona won its first-ever piece of silverware (a bronze object) after beating their biggest rival, Català FC, 3 to 1 courtesy of goals from Joan Gamper (2) and Otto Maier. This was also the first match of the 1900–01 season and the last game played at the Velódromo de la Bonanova.

On 18 November, Barcelona played its first match on a field next to the Hotel Casanovas, the club's second football pitch after Bonanova. They played against Hispania AC and ended in a 0–0 draw.

On 23 December, Barça played their first match against Societat Espanyola de Futbol (Society Spanish Football), which would later become RCD Espanyol. The match ended without goals in an atmosphere of brotherhood.

On 20 January, Barcelona played their first-ever match in an official competition, the opening match of the 1900–01 Copa Macaya against Hispania AC at Hotel Casanovas, but despite scoring first thanks to George Girvan, a Scottish player formerly of Escocès FC, it was Hispania who won 2–1 after coming back with two goals from their captain, Gustavo Green.

On 27 January, Barcelona got their first-ever victory in an official competition after beating Societat Espanyola 4 to 1. Joan Gamper scored all 4 goals.

On 17 March, Barcelona achieved the biggest victory in the club's history with an 18–0 win over AUF Tarragona. Joan Gamper scored half of them, and Alexander Black scored a hat-trick.

On 25 April, Bartomeu Terradas succeeded Walter Wild as president of the club.

== Squad ==
Note: Flags indicate national team as defined under FIFA eligibility rules; some limited exceptions apply. Players may hold more than one non-FIFA nationality.

No.	Pos.	Nation	Player
—	GK	ESP	Vicente Reig
—	GK	ENG	A. J. Smart
—	DF	SCO	George Girvan
—	DF	SCO	Peter Mauchan
—	DF	ESP	Luis Puelles
—	MF	ESP	Bartomeu Terradas
—	MF	ESP	Miguel Valdés
—	MF	GER	Otto Maier
—	MF	SUI	Walter Wild

No.	Pos.	Nation	Player
—	MF	ESP	Pere Cabot
—	MF	ESP	Josep Llobet
—	FW	ESP	Arthur Witty
—	FW	ENG	Stanley Harris
—	FW	SCO	Alexander Black
—	FW	ESP	John Parsons
—	FW	SUI	Hans Gamper
—	FW	ENG	Freeman

== Matches ==
Friendly

23 September 1900	FC Barcelona	3 – 1	Català FC	Barcelona
	Gamper; Maier			Stadium: Velódromo de la Bonanova; Referee: J. Parsons

18 November 1900	FC Barcelona	0 – 0	Hispània AC	Barcelona
				Stadium: Hotel Casanovas; Referee: John Hamilton

2 December 1900	FC Barcelona	1 – 4	Hispània AC	Barcelona
	A. Witty			Stadium: Hotel Casanovas; Referee: Joseph Black

16 December 1900	Hispània AC	2 – 0	FC Barcelona	Barcelona
				Stadium: Hippodrome of Can Tunis; Referee: John Hamilton

23 December 1900	FC Barcelona	0 – 0^{1}	Societat Espanyola de Futbol	Barcelona
				Stadium: Hotel Casanovas; Referee: A. J. Smart

17 January 1901	FC Barcelona	Unknown	Societat Espanyola de Futbol

24 February 1901	FC Barcelona	6 – 0	Societat Espanyola de Futbol	Barcelona
	Gamper; Ossó; J. Parsons o.g.			Stadium: Hotel Casanovas; Referee: Joseph Black

31 March 1901	FC Barcelona	7 – 0	Societat Espanyola de Futbol	Barcelona
	Gamper; Maier; J. Parsons			Stadium: Hotel Casanovas; Referee: Otto Gmeling

Copa Macaya

20 January 1901 Round 1	FC Barcelona	1 – 2	Hispània AC	Barcelona
15:00	Girvan	La Vanguardia; Cihefe	Green	Stadium: Camp de l'Hotel Casanovas; Referee: Ball

27 January 1901 Round 2	FC Barcelona	4 – 1^{3}	Club Espanyol	Barcelona
	Gamper	La Vanguardia; Cihefe	Munné	Stadium: Hotel Casanovas; Referee: King

10 February 1901 Round 4	Club Franco-Español	0 – 13	FC Barcelona	Barcelona
		Cihefe	Gamper; J. Parsons; Girvan	Referee: King

17 February 1901 Round 5	FC Barcelona	Unknown	AUF Tarragona	Barcelona
		Cihefe		Stadium: Hotel Casanovas

17 March 1901 Round 9	AUF Tarragona	0 – 18	FC Barcelona	Tarragona
		Cihefe	Alexander Black; Joan Gamper (9); Peter Mauchan; John Parsons; Bartomeu Terradas; Arthur Witty	Stadium: Velodrome; Attendance: 600; Referee: Alberto Chaperon

7 April 1901 Round 13	FC Barcelona	14 – 0	Club Franco-Español	Barcelona
	John Parsons; Joan Gamper (8); Alexander Black; Arthur Witty	Cihefe		Stadium: Hotel Casanovas; Referee: John Hamilton (Hispania player)
Note: The match only lasted 60 minutes

14 April 1901 Round 15	Hispania AC	1 – 1	FC Barcelona	Barcelona
15:30	Own goal (1–0)	La Vanguardia; Cihefe	Gamper (1–1)	Stadium: Camp del carrer Muntaner; Attendance: 4.000; Referee: William Manchan
Note: Barcelona got two goals but the second, netted by John Parsons, was annulled because, according to the referee, the ball did not cross the goal line.

- 1 First Barcelona-Espanyol in history. The blue-and-white team was called at the beginning Societat Espanyola de Futbol (Society Spanish Football).
- 2 Both teams choose not to provide information, or results, or any other party data.
- 3 The second-round match against Espanyol was not disputed due to its withdrawal from the competition.
