= William Mauchan =

Spanish footballer and referee (1856–1927)

Personal information
- Full name: William Mauchan
- Date of birth: 1856
- Place of birth: Glasgow, Scotland
- Date of death: 1927 (aged 70–71)
- Place of death: Glasgow, Scotland
- Position: Midfielder

Senior career*
| Years | Team | Apps | (Gls) |
| 1900 | Escocès FC | 1 | (0) |
- * Club domestic league appearances and goals

William Mauchan (1856 – 1927) was a Scottish footballer, but mostly a referee, better known for showing the first-ever red card in Spanish football. He was part of the infamous group of Scottish workers that formed Escocès FC. William had six kids who made it into adulthood, all of which, except for his only daughter, were football players.

== Personal life ==
William Mauchan was born in 1856 in Glasgow and he married Elizabeth Stewart in 1879, he aged 24 and she aged 22. The couple then settled in their native city, where they had three sons: William in 1881, who died in infancy, Peter born in 1882 and Archibald born in 1884. William provided for his family as a textile worker, and when he was promoted to be in charge of a production line, the family had to move to Nottingham in England, staying there between 1884 and 1887, and having two more children, Elizabeth born in 1887 and John in 1889.

William was one of many workers at lace manufacturers Johnston, Shields & Co in Newmilns sent over to work in the company's newly opened factory (by John Shields and Edward B. Steegmann) in Sant Martí de Provençals (known as La Escocesa), which started production back in 1893, and thus, the family had to move again, this time to Sant Martí. His experience in Nottingham serves him to continue working as a manager. In this locality, they have two more children, David in 1895 and William in 1897.

Peter will be the first to return to the United Kingdom (before 1909). The rest of the family will return to the United Kingdom at the beginning of the First World War, with the exception of John, known in Catalonia as Joan, who settled in Barcelona. William died in Glasgow in 1927 and his wife died in 1943.

== Refereeing career ==
William was introduced to football in the United Kingdom, and had the official title of referee issued by the Football Association, a title that allowed him to referee several football matches in the Catalan capital. William took part in some of the first football matches in the city in the winter of 1893–94 (at the time, cricket was traditionally played in the summer, and football in the winter), in clashes between the Scottish Colony of Sant Martí and the English Colony of Barcelona. In May 1895, William refereed football matches held at the Velódromo de la Bonanova on the occasion of the opening of the racing season on 12 May. (Note: Some media give him the initial "P" which has nothing to do with William, and it wasn't his son Peter, given that he would only be 13 or 14 at the time.)

At the start of 1900, William and his La Escocesa co-workers set up a football team to pass the time, calling it Escocès FC. His 17/8-year-old son Peter was also a founder of the team, but while he represented them on the pitch, William did it off the pitch as a referee. Team captain John Hamilton was also a referee, and he too oversaw at least one match of Escocès FC, although the nature of their relationship has not been confirmed. William acted as a line judge in the team's debut against FC Barcelona on 2 February 1900, and then he was the referee of their second ever match a week later, on 11 February, also against Barça. This game was filled with heavy and reckless tackles, causing some falls and collisions, which the referee Mauchan tried to solve quickly. However, some of the players came to extreme violence to the point that the game became impossible to manage with fairness and legality, and thus, by the end of the game, Mauchan had become the very first referee to show a red card in Spanish football after sending-off one player from each team, the Englishman Stanley Harris from FC Barcelona and the Scottish Willie Gold from Escocès/Català, thus becoming the very first referee to send-off a Barcelona player. Escocès FC's third match against Català FC on 25 February was refereed by Hamilton, and Escocès fielded two Mauchans, but William was too old at the time (aged 44), while Archibald was too young (aged only 15/6 at the time).

When Escocés FC folded in November 1900, Hispania AC ad FC Barcelona took advantage of its dissolution to incorporate several of its most prominent players, such as his son Peter, who was recruited by the latter, thus became the first-ever Scottish player to wear the Barça shirt alongside George Girvan and Alexander Black. He was the referee of the last match of the first edition of the Copa Macaya, which was one of the most important matches in the early history of Catalan football because it would decide the winner of the tournament between FC Barcelona and Hispania AC, with the latter only needing a draw to win it, and the result smiled at Hispania as they held Barça to a 1–1 draw, with Mauchan disallowing a second goal from Barcelona (scored by John Parsons) for offside, a decision that was heavily contested, with Barça claiming bias refereeing in favor of the organizers of the tournament.

His three youngest kids, John, David and William, founded CE Júpiter on 12 May 1909 at the Cebrian Brewery in Sant Martí. Once in the United Kingdom, William became a correspondent for Mundo Deportivo and promoter of tours of British teams in the Catalan territory. Scottish Motherwell FC and English Burnley FC played friendlies against FC Barcelona in 1927 and 1949, both promoted by William.
