= Escocès FC =

Football club in Spain active in 1900

Escocés Fútbol Club
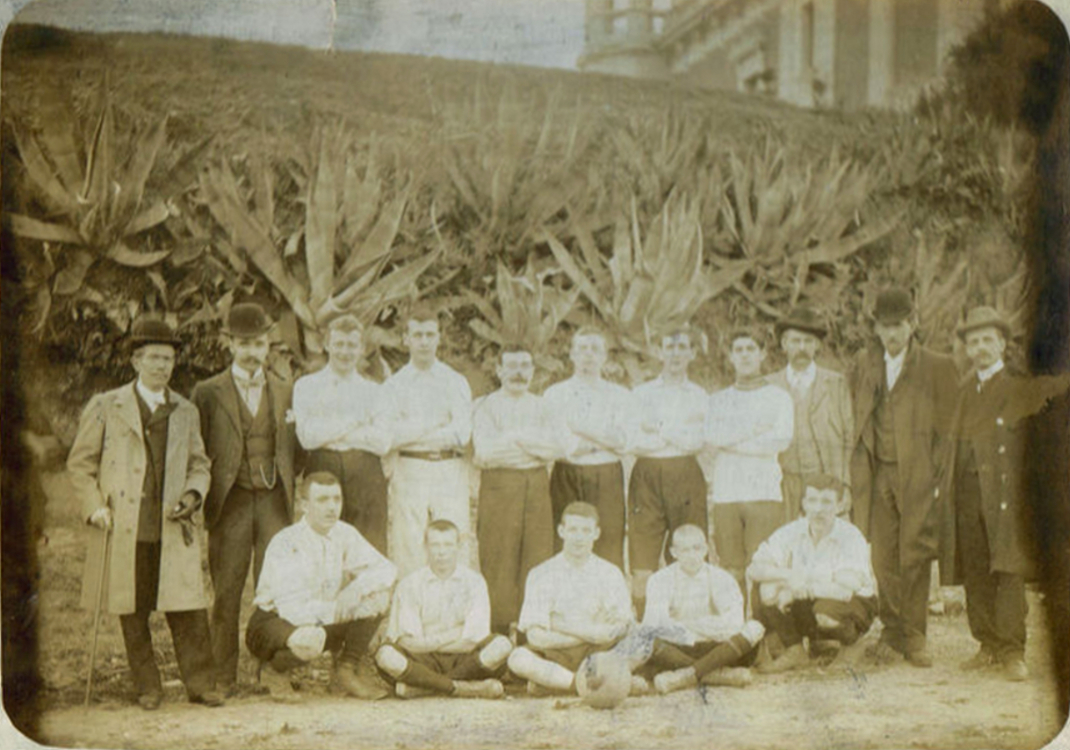
- Short name: Escocés FC
- Founded: January 1900
- Dissolved: November 1900
- Ground: Velódromo de la Bonanova
- League: Copa Macaya
Home colours	Away colours

The Escocès FC, officially founded as Escocés Fútbol Club, was a football team based in Barcelona, Spain, which existed only during the year 1900, playing a total of ten friendlies against the likes of FC Barcelona and Català FC. The team was formed and made up mostly of a group of Scottish workers from a factory in Sant Andreu de Palomar, hence its name.

Escocès FC is best remembered for its role in the amateur beginnings of football in Catalonia, most notably in FC Barcelona's beginnings, as at least four Scots who played for Escocès went on to join Barça, and were prominent figures in its early success. Furthermore, the Scots brought their more advanced knowledge of football to the region, a sport still relatively unknown in Barcelona at the time. Despite its very short life, Escocès FC left a big mark in the history of Catalan football.

== History ==
=== Origins ===
The club's history began when a group of around 40 young Scottish workers at lace manufacturers Johnston, Shields & Co in Newmilns was sent over to work in the company's newly opened textile factory at Sant Martí de Provençals, a neighborhood in Barcelona, which started production back in 1893, after John Shields, one of the founders of the company, and Edward Birkhead Steegmann, an engineer from Nottingham, rented the central warehouses of a factory in Sant Martí to establish a branch of Johnston, Shields & Co in Catalonia, which became known as La Escocesa.

Whilst out in the Catalan capital, the Johnston's Scots began to play football against each other to pass the time, undergo leisure initiatives, and feel more at home. During the winter of 1893–94, the so-called Scottish colony of Sant Martí played a series of matches against the English Colony of Barcelona. The Barcelona press reported matches between these two sides played on 8 December 1893, 11 March, and 15 April 1894, however, due to the little statistical rigor that the newspapers had at that time, very little is known about those matches, only that the team's captains were Willie Gold, the supervisor of the La Escocesa factory, and James Reeves, one of the greatest pioneers of football in Catalonia. Local historians claim that this was the first ever 'unofficial' rivalry in Spanish football. This team seems to disappear in the summer of 1894 as news about them becomes non-existent, but after a few years of "silence", these Scots began to play football again in 1899, with the emergence of Escocès FC.

In late 1899, the Scottish textile workers of Sant Andreu de Palomar, together with seven members from the La Escocesa factory, consolidated a football team which they called Sant Andreu FC (Sant Andreu Foot-ball Club). However, the team became better known as Escocès FC (English: Scottish FC) due to its Scottish links, and it appears that by 1900 their name had changed appropriately to reflect the nationality of their players. (Note: This came a few years after their fellow Johnston, Shields & Co workers did the same in Gothenburg in Sweden when a factory was opened in that city as well, with the team they formed winning the first football match in Sweden on 22 May 1892, and dominating the early years of Swedish football, winning the first four championships between 1896 and 1899.)

=== Members ===
As mentioned, the majority of the club's members were Scottish workers from the factory in Sant Andreu, but the team also had a small group from the La Escocesa factory in Sant Martí. That group consisted of seven employees of Johnston, Shields & Co: John Hamilton, Peter Mauchan, the Black brothers (Alexander and Joseph), George Girvan, Jim Dykes and Willie Gold. The last 5 were born or had a residence in Newmilns, and the latter, Gold, was the supervisor of the La Escocesa factory, a position he held for fifteen years (1893–1908). Mauchan's father, William, and Hamilton, both worked as managers since 1893, and interestingly, those three are the ones (that we know of) who were involved in the matches of the winter of 1893–94. The positions of the Blacks, Girvan and Dykes are still unclear, and the remaining players, of whom we know nothing about, were the Scottish textile workers from the factory in Sant Andreu. William Mauchan never played a match for Escocès FC, but he was the referee of at least three of them. Gustavo Green also never played for Escocès despite being involved with the team at one point, being the only documented non-Scottish member of the team.

Only two members of this group had previously played a game in Barcelona: Goalkeeper and team captain John Hamilton and midfielder Jim Dykes, who covered the losses of Team Anglès in a match against FC Barcelona on 6 January 1900 which ended in a 3–0 win. Although the figure of a coach as we know it today did not yet exist, it was Hamilton who, as captain, was in charge of orienting the team, making up the line-ups and dictating the tactics to be followed. In addition to being a player and a "coach", he was also capable of performing the functions of a referee, overseeing at least one of Escocès matches.

=== Debut ===
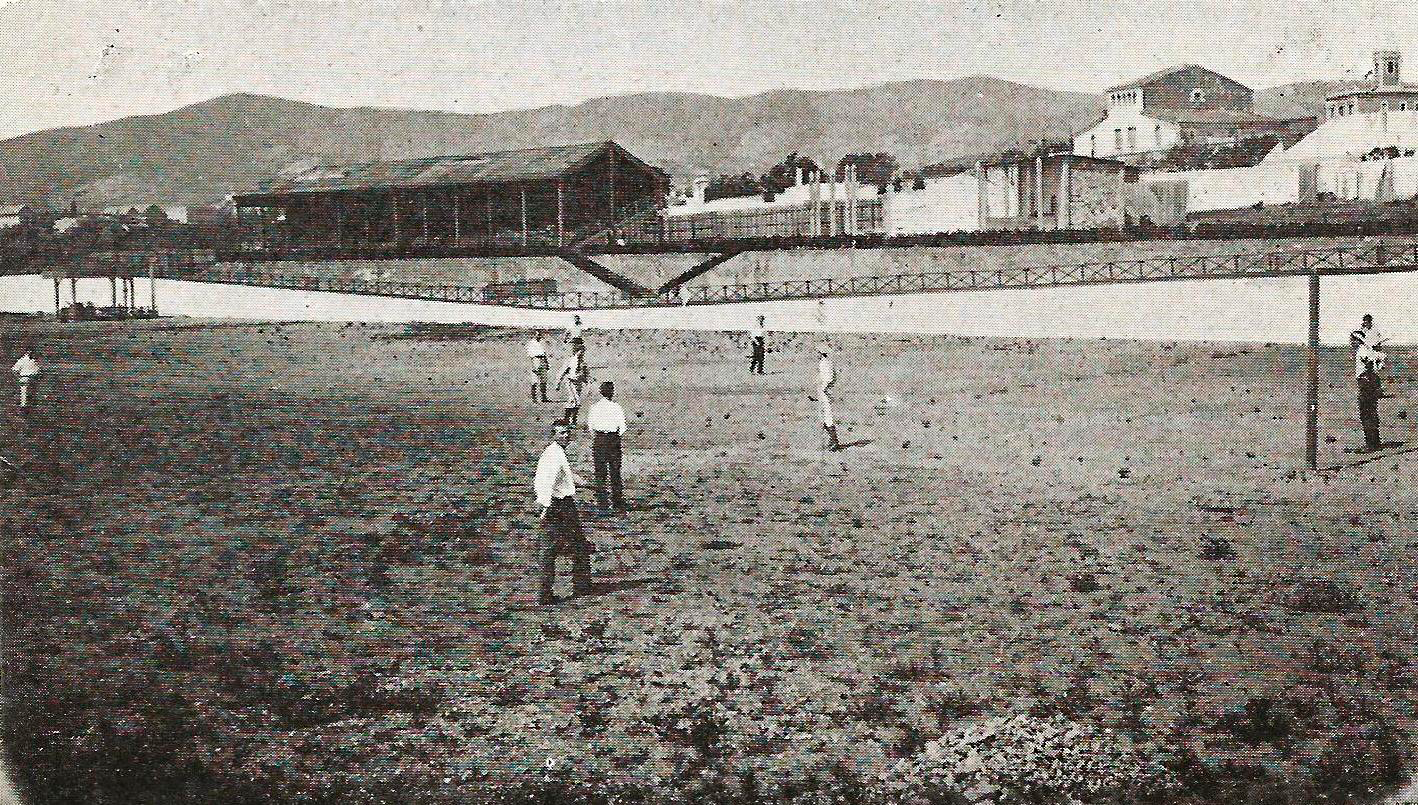
One of the Escocès-Catalá matches played at the Velódromo de la Bonanova

The team's home ground was a field in the Sant Martí neighborhood, which they used to train, although it hosted no games as all the friendlies that they played were held on the opposite field, which was often at Velódromo de la Bonanova since at the time it was the home ground of both FC Barcelona and Catalá FC. On 6 January, the secretary of the recently founded Sant Andreu FC (or San Andrés FBC) introduced himself to the presidents of FC Barcelona after the Blaugrana's 3–0 loss to Team Anglès, who had played with Andreu's Hamilton and Dykes, and challenged the Barcelona team to a match stating that "they would have great pleasure to play a match with the teams of Barcelona". Barcelona accepted since, judging by the skill shown by two members of Sant Andreu that played against Barça, it promised to be interesting under all aspects. And so, on 2 February 1900, the team of Sant Andreu, now named Escocès FC (since 31 January), made its debut against the Catalans. The Scottish team, who played in white shirts and black shorts, consisted of Hamilton in goal, Fallon and Wallace in defense, Dykes, McLachlan and Denniston in the middle, and Mauchan, Gold, the Black brothers, and Girvan as forwards. The match ended in a 2–0 defeat to Barcelona, who were disputing only their sixth ever game since their foundation two months prior on 29 November 1899, with both of Barca's goals coming from club founder and later president of the club, Joan Gamper. Local historians claim that this game was the first ever 'unofficial' Spanish cup final, with the match itself recorded as Amistoso Internacional (English: International friendly). The result came somewhat as a surprise given that the Scottish had naturally a more advanced knowledge of the sport than the Spanish.

=== Controversy with Barcelona and Català ===
In the following week, on 11 February, six players from Escocès reinforced Català FC, the first-ever team formed in Barcelona, in a match against FC Barcelona, who were Hamilton, Denniston, Dykes, A. Black, Gold and Girvan. Despite these reinforcements, however, Gamper's team still won 4–0, and referee William Mauchan disallowed two more Barça goals, but Mauchan's refereeing in this match is most remembered for a different reason. After the Scot Willie Gold was brought down by Barça's Englishman Stanley Harris with a strong tackle and Gold reacted with an equally strong action, punching him, which caused a fight between players of both teams, Mauchan sent off his countryman Gold, making of Escocès FC the victim of the very first red card shown in Spanish football. Harris was then also sent off, thus becoming the very first player in Barça's history to be sent off during a match. This incident caused Joan Gamper, Barça's captain in this match, to resign from the position, but the extraordinary board of FC Barcelona did not accept his resignation. Of course, Barcelona decided and refused to play any team with Scottish players in their ranks for a year, if an apology was not received, and both Escocès and Català refused to do so. For this reason, Escocès never faced Barcelona again, settling for confrontations against Català until the end of the season, except for a match against the curiously named HMS Calliope. Escocès FC's 4–0 loss to Barcelona was the team's lowest point, however, the club soon bounced back and managed an impressive seven wins out of eight: six in six against Català between 25 February and 29 April, and then, following a 7-month hiatus without playing, one final win on 11 November against Hispania AC, a team formed by a group of dissident players of Català FC. Their third and final defeat came at the hands of HMS Calliope (2–3). In that match, the Escocès players combined with Team Anglès in order to bolster their numbers, playing with the likes of Stanley Harris and John Parsons, and naturally, the Scots blamed their misfortunes on their neighbors.

With only a month of existence, the club was immersed in a three-way controversy with FC Barcelona and Català FC, due to some players who, in a very short space of time, played matches with both Escocès and Catalá, such as Gustavo Green and Joseph Black, causing Barcelona to launch complaints in their direction as they were unhappy about Escocès stars turning out for their city rivals at the time. The local press, who were falling in the love with the game that had grabbed the city's residents, began mocking these Scottish players by calling them 'taxi-footballers', due to the ease with which they changed teams. Barcelona then took the quite incredible step of implementing a ban on using any Scottish player in their ranks for a period of one year. Ironically, both Green and Black went on to be key players in the early days of FC Barcelona after the short-lived ban on Scots players was lifted.

=== Decline and collapse ===
Escocès FC had a very short life span, dissolving in November of 1900 due to Barcelona's bans on Scottish players, who then lifted the "punishment" on them on 27 December. Escocès FC's players were distributed among the different existing teams, Català FC, FC Barcelona and Hispània AC, but it was the latter two who took the most advantage of its dissolution, as both managed to incorporate three of the team's most prominent players, with Hispania recruiting J. Hamilton, J. Black and Gold, while Barça recruits Mauchan, Girvan and A. Black after the ban on Scots was lifted. Two months later, Hispania AC organized the first edition of the Copa Macaya in 1901, which was the first football championship played on the Iberian Peninsula, and those six Scottish players all scored at least one goal at the tournament, with Girvan netting the very first competitive goal in Barça's history in the first match of the Copa Macaya, while both Blacks netted 5 goals each. In the end, the title come down to a clash between those two sides on 14 April 1901, in a game where all of those six Scottish players started for their respective teams, meaning that the former Escocès FC teammates and friends had now to face each other in order to achieve historical immortality. Hispania only needed a home draw to win the title, and likewise, they held Barça to a 1–1 draw, meaning J. Hamilton, J. Black and Gold helped Hispania to become the first-ever Spanish club to win an official title. The former two joined Barcelona when Hispania collapsed in 1903, meaning that a total of five Escocès FC players went on to wear the Barça shirt.

== Notable players ==
- John Hamilton: Captain and the team's goalkeeper. Winner of the 1900–01 Copa Macaya with Hispania AC and a Catalan championship with Barcelona (1904–1905). The first president of the College of Catalan Referees.
- George Girvan: The goalscorer of the very first competitive goal in Barcelona's history, when he netted in the opening match of the first Copa Macaya in 1901. Mayor of Newmilns.
- Peter Mauchan: The first-ever Scottish player to wear the Barcelona shirt together with Girvan. Winner of the 1901–02 Copa Macaya with Barcelona.
- Archibald Mauchan: Brother of Peter.
- Joseph Black: Winner of the 1900–01 Copa Macaya with Hispania AC and a Catalan championship with Barcelona (1904–1905).
- Alenxader Black: Brother of Joseph. Winner of the 1901–02 Copa Macaya with Barcelona.
- Willie Gold: Winner of the 1900–01 Copa Macaya with Hispania AC. He was the victim of the very first red card in a football match in Spain.
- Gustavo Green: Winner of the three editions of the Copa Macaya and two Catalan Championships. He is the only documented non-Scottish member of Escocès FC.

== Squad ==
Note: Flags indicate national team as defined under FIFA eligibility rules; some limited exceptions apply. Players may hold more than one non-FIFA nationality.

No.	Pos.	Nation	Player
—	GK	(Scotland) SCO	John Hamilton
—	GK	(Scotland) SCO	Young
—	DF	(Scotland) SCO	Wallace
—	DF	(Scotland) SCO	W. Barringer
—	DF	(Scotland) SCO	J. Fallon
—	DF	(Scotland) SCO	J. White
—	MF	(Scotland) SCO	Wishart
—	MF	(Scotland) SCO	C. McLachlan

No.	Pos.	Nation	Player
—	MF	(Scotland) SCO	J. Denniston
—	MF	(Scotland) SCO	Jim Dykes
—	FW	(Scotland) SCO	Alexander Black
—	FW	(Scotland) SCO	Joseph Black
—	FW	(Scotland) SCO	Willie Gold
—	FW	(Scotland) SCO	Peter Mauchan
—	FW	(Scotland) SCO	George Girvan
—	FW	(Spain) ESP	Gustavo Green

== Results ==
Friendlies

2 February 1900	FC Barcelona	2 – 0	Escocés FC	Barcelona
15:00	Gamper Smart; Wild, Fitzmaurice; Terradas, A. Witty, Llobet; Gillespie, Maier, Gamper, E. Witty, Bastow	Report	Hamilton; Wallace, Fallon; Denniston, Wishart, Dykes; A. Black, Gold, J. Black, Mauchan, Girvan	Stadium: Velódromo de la Bonanova; Referee: J. Caldwell; Assistant referees: Luis de Ossó; William Mauchan

11 February 1900	FC Barcelona	4 – 0	Català FC + Escocés FC	Barcelona
15:00 — Agreed	E. Witty; Gamper Smart; Wild, Fitzmaurice; Terradas, A. Witty, Llobet; Gillespie, Parsons, Gamper, E. Witty, Harris	Report	Hamilton; Lomba, Brown; Denniston, Soley, Dykes; A. Black, Mir, Gold, Girvan, G. Busquets	Stadium: Velódromo de la Bonanova; Referee: William Mauchan; Assistant referees: Gordon Bastow; Manuel Planells

25 February 1900	Català FC	1 – 5	Escocés FC	Barcelona
10:00	A. Lomba; Vila, Lomba; J.A. Busquets, Soley, Garcés; L. Valls, Julià García, Artús, Sanmartín, F. Valls	Report	Young; Barringer, Fallon; Denniston, McLachlan, Dykes; A. Black, A. Mauchan, J. Black, P. Mauchan, Girvan	Stadium: Velódromo de la Bonanova; Referee: John Hamilton

4 March 1900	Català FC	1 – 6	Escocés FC	Barcelona
15:00	Garcés A. Lomba; Vila, Ortiz; Joan García, G. Ríos, Garcés; Lambea, Julià García, Planells, Sanmartín, Soley	Report	Hamilton; Barringer, Fallon; Denniston, McLachlan, Dykes; A. Black, Gold, J. Black, Mauchan, Girvan	Stadium: Velódromo de la Bonanova; Referee: José Ramón Lomba de la Pedraja

9 March 1900	Team Anglès + Escocés FC	2 – 3	HMS Calliope	Barcelona
15:45 — Agreed	Girvan; Parsons Smart; Hamilton, Dykes; Denniston, Girvan, Harris, Gillespie, Parsons, J. Black, E. Witty, Bastow	Report	Way; Bain Roe; Chapman, Cleary; McYarlane, Way, Moorsom; Brock, Bain, Smith, Jackson, Robinson	Stadium: Velódromo de la Bonanova

18 March 1900	Català FC	2 – 9	Escocés FC	Barcelona
15:00	Soley; Planells A. Lomba; J. Soler, Ortiz; J.A. Busquets, Vila, Joan García; G. Busquets, Julià García, Planells, Sanmartín, Soley	Report	? ? Hamilton; Berringer, Fallon; Denniston, Green, Dykes; A. Black, Gold, J. Black, Mauchan, Girvan	Stadium: Velódromo de la Bonanova
Note: Escocès FC's line-up is not stated in the chronicles of this match, however, it's presumed to be the one that appears in the infamous photograph, which was taken around March.

1 April 1900	Català FC	0 – 4	Escocés FC	Barcelona
15:00	A. Lomba; J. Soler, Ortiz; J.A. Busquets, G. Ríos, Joan García; G. Busquets, Julià García, Green, Sanmartín, Soley	Report	Hamilton; White, Fallon; Denniston, McLachlan, Dykes; A. Black, Gold, J. Black, Mauchan, Girvan	Stadium: Velódromo de la Bonanova

22 April 1900	Català FC	0 – 2	Escocés FC	Barcelona
15:00	A. Lomba; J. Soler, Ortiz; J.A. Busquets, G. Ríos, Joan García; G. Busquets, Valdés, Green, Sanmartín, Andreu	Report	? J. Denniston, ? J. Hamilton, ?, ? A. Black, ?, J. Black, ?, ?	Stadium: Velódromo de la Bonanova

29 April 1900	Català FC	0 – 10	Escocés FC	Barcelona
17:25	A. Lomba; J. Soler, Ortiz; J.A. Busquets, G. Ríos, Joan García; G. Busquets, Valdés, Green, Sanmartín, Andreu	Report		Stadium: Velódromo de la Bonanova; Referee: William Mauchan

11 November 1900	Hispania AC	2 – 4	Escocés FC	Barcelona
15:00	S. Morris ?, ? ?, ?, ? E. Morris, Colt, Green, Sanmartín, Lomba	Report	Hamilton ?, ? ?, ?, ? A. Black, ?, J. Black, ?, ?	Stadium: New Velodrome de Barcelona

== Photography of Escocès FC ==
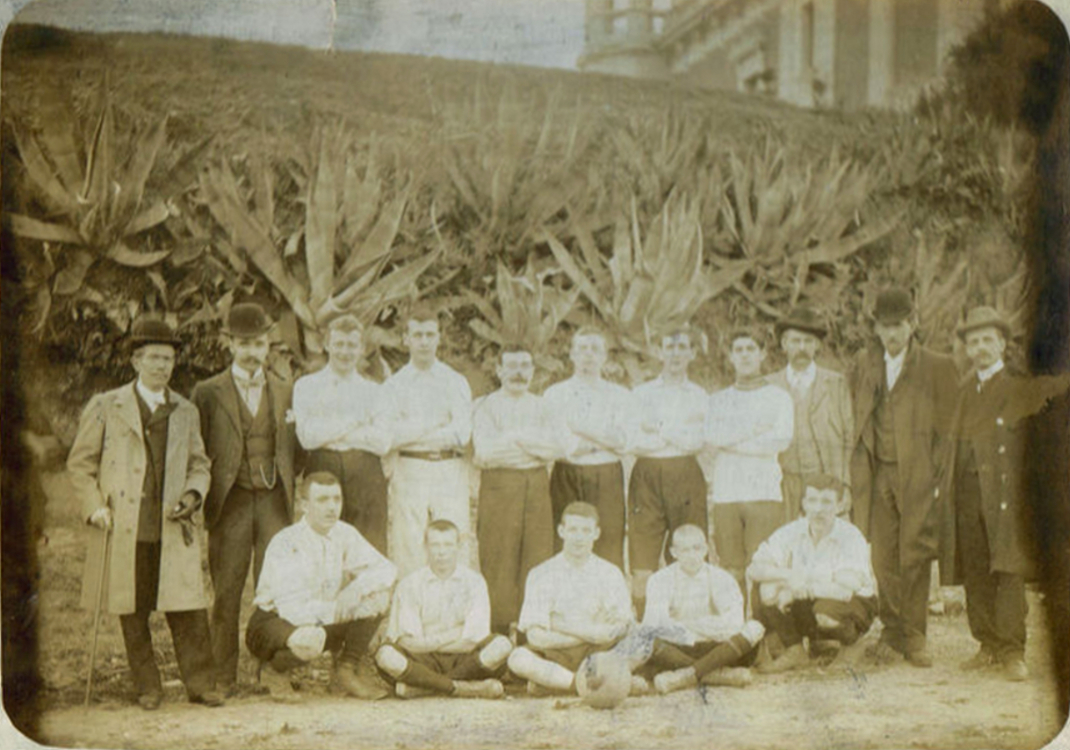
The Escocès FC squad, the oldest photograph of a football club in Spain

On 6 March 2012, the Unió Esportiva Sant Andreu website published "The presentation of the photo of Escocès FC, the first photo of a club in Spain", which was obtained by Hèctor Alonso, the manager of the club, through Susanna Warner, George Girvan's granddaughter. On a website no longer operational (s1newmilns) on 6 December 2010, Susanna asked a certain Jim Wilson about his grandfather George, and in the course of the conversation, she stated that she was in possession of the photo of Escocès FC, the team in which Susanna's grandfather played. In 2012, Alonso was collecting data from the first documented team in the neighborhood, Escocés FC, when he found out about this conversation, so he got in touch with Susanna and she ended up sending him the photo. The image has since then been certified as the oldest available by the Spanish Football History and Statistics Research Center (CIHEFE). The photo has a massive historical significance as it is the oldest photograph of a football club in Spain.

16 people appear in it, 11 of which are in sports uniforms and the remaining 5 in street. The caption only named 10 players and goes as follows: J. Green (Gustavo Green), J. Denniston, J. Hamilton, W. Gold, J. Fallon, J. Girvan (George Girvan), P. Mauchon, W. Berringer, J. Dykes and J. Black, but does not specify who is who. Two years later, in 2014, Federico Steegmann claims that the third figure on the right is his grandfather, Edward Birkhead Steegmann, and that John and Thomas Shields could also appear in the photo (a year later, Thomas would be the president of the Copa Macaya committee). Due to its historical importance, the photo went through restoration works and years later the enhanced photo appears with the entire photo caption: the missing letters were A. Black.
