= Peter Mauchan =

Spanish footballer (1882–1943)

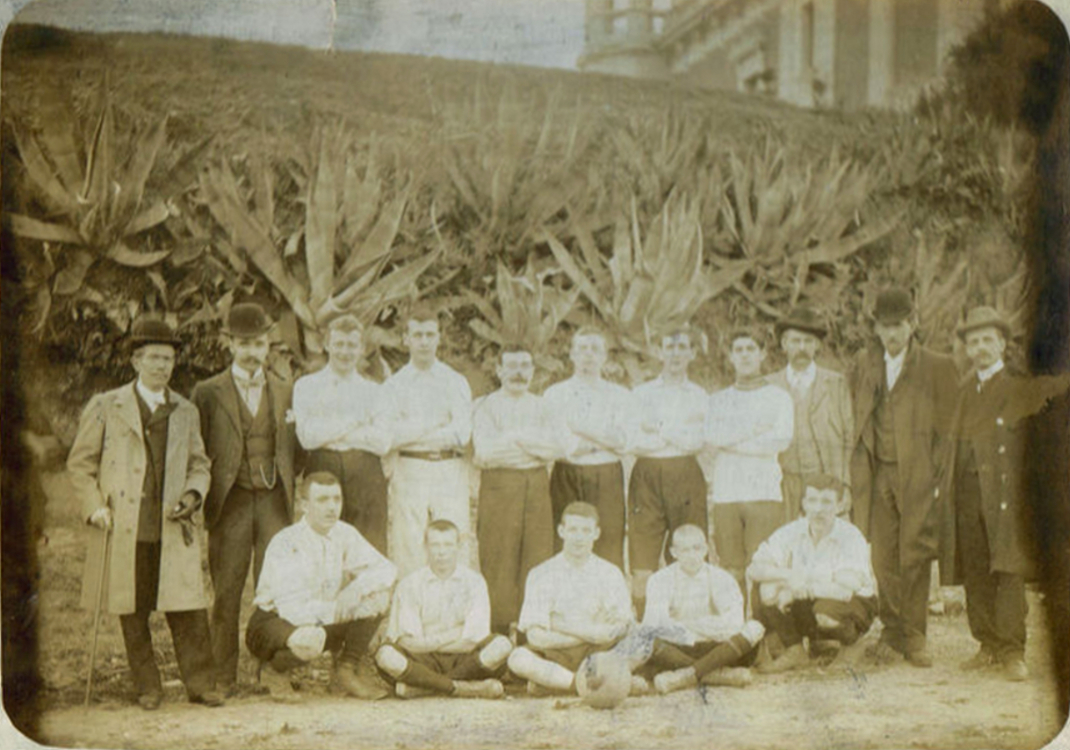
- Players and managers of Escocès FC in a snapshot taken around March 1900. Mauchan is among them.

Personal information
- Full name: Peter Mauchan
- Date of birth: 1882
- Place of birth: Glasgow, Scotland
- Date of death: 5 November 1943 (aged 61)
- Place of death: Halifax, England
- Positions: Forward; midfielder; defender

Senior career*
Years	Team	Apps	(Gls)
1900	Escocès FC	+5	(+0)
1900–1901	FC Barcelona	7	(2)
- * Club domestic league appearances and goals

Peter Mauchan (1882 – 5 November 1943) was a Scottish footballer who played for Spanish club FC Barcelona at the turn of the century. He was part of the infamous group of Scottish workers that formed Escocès FC. Peter is often confused with his younger brother, David Mauchan, who is often wrongly credited with being the one who played for Escocès FC and FC Barcelona, which is not possible as David was only born in 1895.

== Early life ==
Peter Mauchan was born in Glasgow in 1882, as the son of William Mauchan, a football referee, and Elizabeth Stewart. Due to his father's textile profession, the family moved to Nottingham between 1884 and 1887. His father was one of many workers at lace manufacturers Johnston, Shields & Co in Newmilns sent over to work in the company's newly opened factory in Sant Martí de Provençals (known as La Escocesa), a neighborhood in Barcelona, and thus, the family had to move again, this time to Sant Martí.

== Escocès FC ==
Thanks to his father, he became an employee of Johnston, Shields & Co at the end of the 19th century, around the age of 17. At the start of 1900, the 17/8-year-old Peter and his co-workers set up a football team to pass the time, calling it Escocès FC. In addition to Peter, this team also had the likes of George Girvan, the Black brothers (Alexander and Joseph) and team captain John Hamilton, all of which, including him, went on to play for FC Barcelona. Both he and his father William, who was not one of the founders, played a pivotal role in the team's results, Peter as a forward, and William as a referee. Because of this, Peter would rarely be tackled by the opposition, as they feared his father's red card, and in fact, his father was the first referee in Spanish football to show one when on 11 February 1900, in a clash against FC Barcelona, he sent off Barça's Englishman Stanley Harris after a foul on his fellow countryman Willie Gold, who was also sent off after throwing a punch on Harris. Peter played alongside his brother Archibald (aged only 15/6 at the time) in Escocès FC's third match on 25 February against Català FC.

== FC Barcelona ==
In November 1900, Escocés FC folded and Barcelona took advantage of its dissolution to incorporate several of its most prominent players, such as Mauchan, A. Black, and Girvan, who thus became the first-ever Scottish players to wear the Barça shirt. Mauchan was noted as being both incredibly strong and having great skill with the ball, especially in comparison to the young locals of Barcelona at the time. For this reason, during his time at Barça, he played as a defender on the left wing, and in his first season, he played seven games, scoring twice, including one goal at the first edition of the Copa Macaya in 1901, which came in an 18–0 trashing of Club Tarragona, thus contributing in Barça's biggest victory at the tournament, which ended in a runner-up finish to Hispania AC. (Note: According to the press, Barcelona enrolls N. Mauchan in the first edition of the Copa Macaya. This initial does not match any of the Mauchan family members' initials. It is worth saying that the same media wrote another Barça player as N. Girvan, when this one was called George Girvan.)

== Later life ==
Peter retired from football shortly after, but due to his immense love for the game and following the influences of his father and John Hamilton before him, he became a referee. His brothers, John and David, founded CE Júpiter in 1909. The club still exists to this day in the lower leagues, being one of the oldest teams in the city.

Peter will be the first to return to the United Kingdom (before 1909). In 1912 he married Mabel Alice Sidney, with whom he had a daughter, Vera Phyllis in 1913. The family lived in Buenos Aires and his daughter was born there. As a commercial professional, he made countless trips in his life. Peter died in Halifax (England) on 5 November 1943.
