= Samuel Morris (footballer) =

Spanish footballer

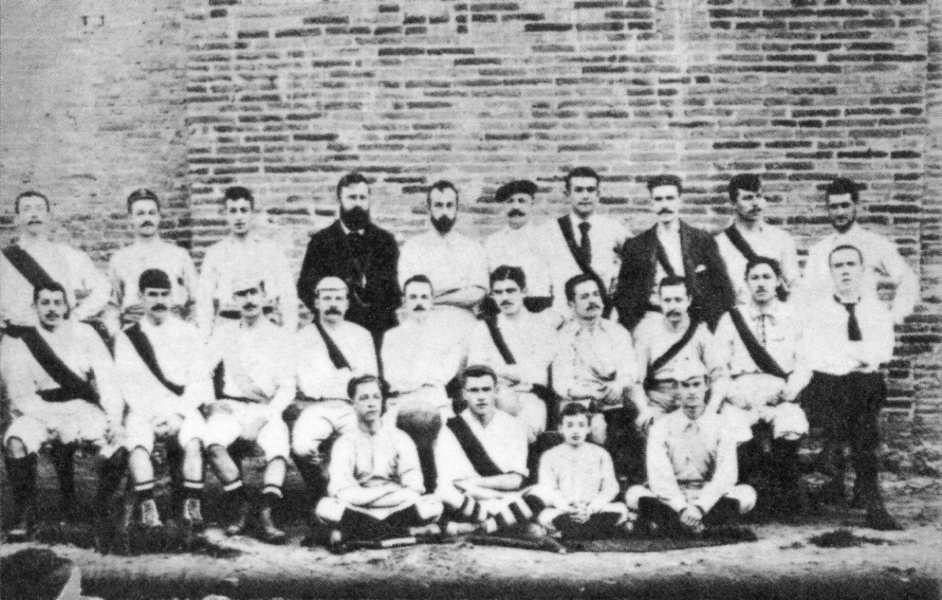
- Samuel Morris (standing, the second from the left) in 1893.

Personal information
- Full name: Samuel Alfredo Morris de Olea
- Date of birth: 1870
- Place of birth: Manila, Philippines, Spain
- Date of death: 23 August 1935 (aged 64–65)
- Place of death: Barcelona, Catalonia, Spain
- Positions: Goalkeeper; midfielder

Senior career*
Years	Team	Apps	(Gls)
1892–1894	Barcelona Football Club		
1895–1896	Sociedad de Foot-Ball de Barcelona		
1899	Team Anglès	1	(0)
1900–1902	Hispania AC		
1902	FC Barcelona	2	(0)
1902–1903	Hispania AC		

International career
1903	Barcelona	3	(0)
- * Club domestic league appearances and goals

Samuel Alfredo Morris de Olea (1870 – 23 August 1935), was an Anglo-Filipino football pioneer who played as a goalkeeper and midfielder for some of the earliest Catalan clubs in existence. His younger brothers, Enrique and Miguel, followed him every step through, and together with them, he was one of the first pioneers of football in Catalonia, participating in some of the first football matches of the city and playing for several experimental teams in the 1890s such as Barcelona Football Club and Sociedad de Foot-Ball de Barcelona.

During the second half of his career in the early 1900s, he played for Hispania AC and FC Barcelona, being a member of the Hispania side that won the 1900–01 Copa Macaya, which was the very first football competition played on the Iberian Peninsula, and a member of the Barça side that reached the final of the 1902 Copa de la Coronación. In addition to being a footballer, he also practiced cricket, athletics, cycling, rugby, tennis, and hockey, and was also an outstanding football referee.

== Early life ==
Samuel Morris was born in 1870 in the Philippines, as the son of the English businessman and engineer Samuel James Morris Campbell (1842–1909) and María del Socorro de Olea y Marabea (1852–1877), a teenager of Basque origin. In 1886 the family moved to Barcelona, where his father had been transferred to run the Barcelona Tramways Company Limited. On the grounds near the Hippodrome of Can Tunis, their father taught his three sons Samuel, Enrique (Henry) and Miguel (Júnior) the practice of football, a sport that was practically unknown in the city at the time.

== Sporting career ==
=== Barcelona Cricket Club ===
In the late 1880s, Morris became a member of the British Club de Barcelona, just like his father. There, he practiced several modalities such as cycling, rugby, tennis, and hockey. In 1891, together with his father, Henry Wood, and William MacAndrews, he founded the Barcelona Cricket Club, one of the many branches of the British Club. They played their first cricket matches in a field near the Hippodrome of Can Tunis, which were disputed between the club's members and on some occasions against British sailors who docked in the port of Barcelona, with the earliest example of this dating back to 28 August 1891. Eventually, his younger brother Enrique also joined the Cricket Club.

Together with his father, Morris was one of the first pioneers of football in Catalonia, being part of the first known club to have played football in the city, the Barcelona Cricket Club, since they played cricket in the summer and then football in the winter (which was common at the time). His younger brother Enrique eventually also joined the cricket club and then the football team.

=== Barcelona Football Club ===
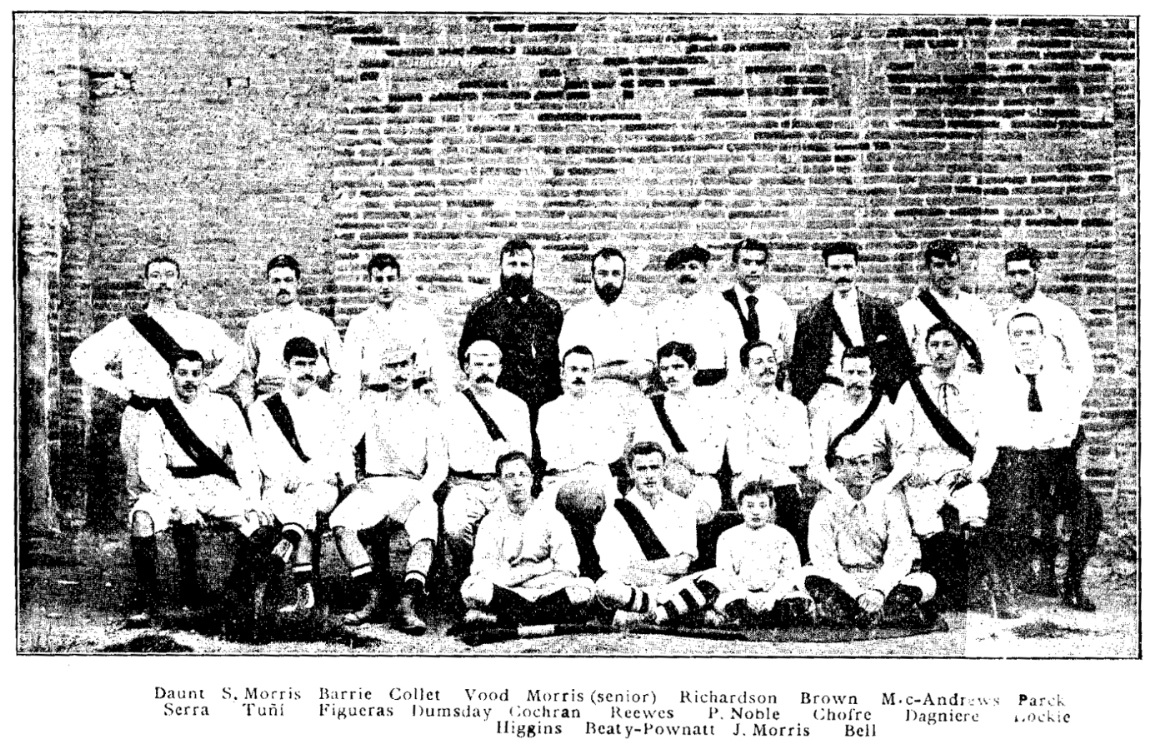
The oldest photo of a football team in Spain. Samuel can be seen standing in the third row, the second from the left, in-between Daunt and his friend Jorge Barrié.

In 1892, Morris and his father met James Reeves, who approached the cricket club's members to propose to them the idea of creating a well-organized football club, and the Morris were among the first to join him, as they were also in love with the game. The Morris helped Reeves to find enough people to assemble two teams through their connections in the city, especially with the Barcelona Cricket Club, thus playing a vital role in the formation of the Barcelona Football Club in late 1892, and together with Reeves, they were crucial in its success.

This entity held the first known football match in the city, which was held at Hippodrome of Can Tunis on 25 December 1892. It remains unclear if they actually played in this match or not, but they surely played on 12 March 1893, in the historic match between a blue team and a red team, and interestingly, the Morris were on opposite teams, with his father playing for the Reds as a goalkeeper while Samuel represented the Blues as a midfielder in a 2–1 win, although he failed to score against his 51-year-old father. Together with their younger brother, Miguel, the three of them appeared in what is regarded to be the oldest photograph of a football team in Spain, which was these two sides before the match on 12 March.

=== Sociedad de Foot-Ball de Barcelona ===
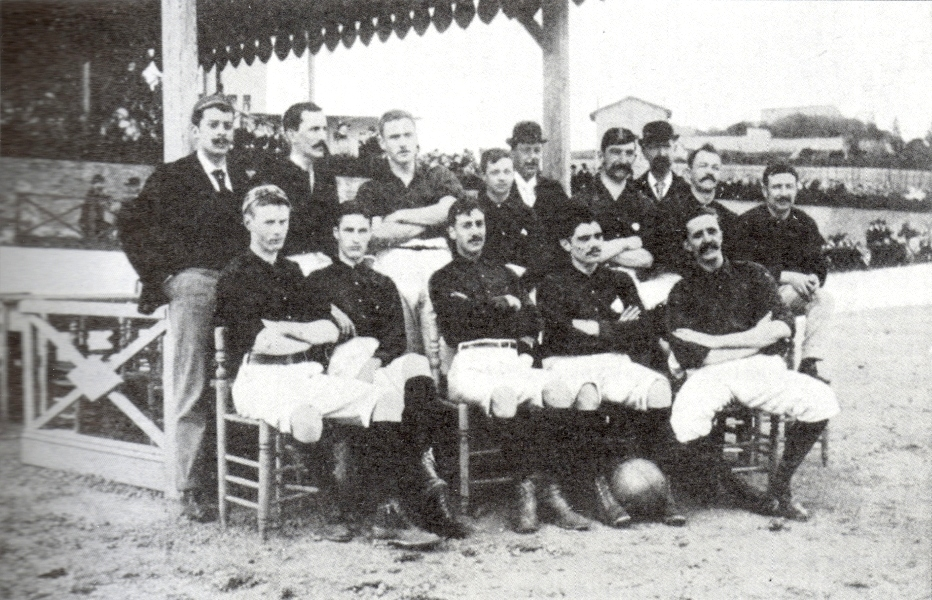
Samuel Morris (standing, the second from the right) in 1895

Morris played several training matches at Can Tunis and a few others at Bonanova between 1892 and 1896, the last of which for the Sociedad de Foot-Ball de Barcelona, which the Morris and Reeves, among others, had founded in 1895. On 27 January 1895, he was one of 16 footballers who featured in the first football match played in Bonanova, and although it is not specified in which position he played, he scored the Red's only goal in a 1–4 loss to a Blue side that featured his younger brother Enrique.

Morris also played against teams from Sant Martí in 1893 and another from Torelló in 1895, the Torelló Foot-ball Association, the latter of which marked the first time that teams from two different cities played against each other in Catalonia. Initially, he stood out as a great midfielder, but he later moved on to play as a goalkeeper just like his father, with his first known appearance as such coming in 1895 against Torelló.

=== Team Anglès ===
Following the departure of James Reeves, the club's captain and leader, the Barcelona Football Society declined and disappeared around 1896. The city then went through a period of lack of interest in football, and for this reason, no Briton played football in Spain (that we know of) in 1897 and 1898. Together with the Parsons brothers (John and William), the Morris played an important role in the return of football to the city by contributing to the emergence of Team Anglès, a team made up of members of the British colony living in Barcelona. In fact, a player named Morrison played in the team's official debut against FC Barcelona on 8 December 1899, which was probably just a press mistake and who was most likely Enrique.

Either way, Samuel did play for Team Anglès on 6 January 1900, featuring in midfield alongside Morrison (Enrique) after being ousted from his usual position by John Hamilton, a Scottish goalkeeper from Escocès FC who had been called up to cover the losses of Team Anglès.

=== Hispania AC ===
In October 1900, Samuel, Enrique, and their father took part in the foundation of Hispania AC, with Morris later becoming a vice president of the club, while their youngest brother Miguel eventually joined them in Hispania in 1901. Together with John Parsons and captain Gustavo Green, the Morris brothers, Enrique as a forward and Samuel as a goalkeeper, played a pivotal role in helping Hispania AC become the very first Spanish club to win an official title, the 1900–01 Copa Macaya, which was the first football competition played on the Iberian Peninsula. In the decisive game against Barcelona on 14 April 1901, Hispania only needed a draw to win the title, and it was largely thanks to Samuel's heroic efforts that they managed to resist Barça's intense siege in an eventual 1–1 draw. After the match, he was highly congratulated, "first for his skillful work and the second for not having denied the reputation of being insurmountable that preceded it".

Together with fellow Hispania teammate Carlos Soley, Morris participated in the Copa Macaya as both a player and a referee, as the two of them officiated a game between Tarragona and Club Espanyol on 10 February 1901, which ended in a 0–2 win to the latter. After the match, he and Soley praised the gallantry displayed by the debutants Tarragona, who fought with determination and enthusiasm, but somewhat lacking in practice.

=== FC Barcelona ===
During his time as a player for Hispania, the three Morris brothers joined the ranks of FC Barcelona on two occasions: the first on the occasion of the match against the officers of the British cruise ship HS Calliope on 23 November 1901, where they helped Barça to a 4–0 victory, and the second in May of 1902, when they reinforced FC Barcelona during its participation in the Copa de la Coronación (predecessor of Copa del Rey). In doing so, they became the first-ever Filipinos to play for FC Barcelona, ahead of the likes of Manuel Amechazurra and Paulino Alcántara.

Morris participated in the Copa de la Coronación as both a player and a referee, since he oversaw the quarterfinals between Bizcaya and Club Español and the semifinals between Club Bizcaya and New Foot-Ball Club, both of which ending in comfortable victories to Club Bizcaya. This caused him to miss Barça's semifinal match with Real Madrid CF (then Madrid FC), which was the very first El Clásico in history (he was replaced by Luis Puelles), but Morris started in the final, where Barça was defeated 2–1 by Club Vizcaya (a combination of players from Athletic Club and Bilbao Football Club). This was only his second match for the club, but also his last.

After this parenthesis with Barça, the Morris brothers continued to play at Hispania AC until 1903, when the club was dissolved for lack of players, but while Enrique and Miguel then joined FC Barcelona permanently, Samuel decided to retire due to his already advanced age. In fact, in the Los Deportes issue of 26 January 1902, the sports journalist Alberto Serra described him as "one of the oldest players in this capital".

=== International career ===
In 1903, Morris played several friendly matches between teams made up of the best players in Barcelona, contesting the position of goalkeeper with the likes of Vicente Reig, José María Acha, and Juli Marial. On 24 September 1903, he played in a test match between two "Barcelona teams" that was meant to decide who would integrate the first selection of the Catalonia national team the following year.

=== Athletic career ===
In the Mundo Deportivo issue of 24 March 1910, Morris was mentioned as being the "English coach" of RCD Espanyol. He was also described as "perhaps the best goalkeeper in Spain" and as a "Great runner of 100 meters". In fact, in November 1900, a Hispania player named Morris, hence either him or Enrique, participated in a 100-meter foot sprint race, next to the Casanovas hotel, in which he retired together with Crespo.

=== Later career ===
Also considered one of the best football referees of the time, in 1909 he received a distinction from the Catalan Football Federation. In 1906 he founded the Sociedad de Sport Vasco de Barcelona with his friend Enrique Barrié, the father of his former teammate Jorge Barrié. During the years 1913 and 1914, an attempt was made to bet on cricket in Barcelona, and as a result, FC Barcelona created the cricket section and Samuel was one of the players.

== Personal life ==
Morris married Antonia Montero in Barcelona in 1896, and the couple had four children, Elena Antonia, Samuel Ernesto (1900–1974), Enrique Reginaldo (1902–1964), and Edgar. He always lived in Barcelona and remained linked to football; for instance, on 26 February 1931, he served as Jim Bellamy's translator in an interview.

Morris died in Barcelona on 23 August 1935 at the age of 65.

== Honours ==
Hispania AC

- Copa Macaya:
  - Champion: 1900–01
  - Runner-up: 1901–02

Barcelona

- Copa de la Coronación:
  - Runner-up: 1902
