= Willie Gold =

Spanish footballer

Personal information
- Place of birth: Newmilns, Scotland
- Date of death: Unknown
- Position: Forward

Senior career*
Years	Team	Apps	(Gls)
1893–1894	Scottish colony of Sant Martí	+3	(0)
1900	Escocès FC		
1900–1903	Hispania AC		
- * Club domestic league appearances and goals

William Gold was a Scottish footballer. He is best known for being the receiver of the very first red card shown in Spanish football. Gold was also a member of the side that won the very first Spanish club to win an official title, the 1900–01 Copa Macaya with Hispania AC.

== Biography ==
Willie Gold was born in Newmilns, where he was introduced to football and to his wife, providing for his family as a textile worker employee at lace manufacturers Johnston, Shields & Co. He was eventually promoted to be in charge of a production line, and the experience he gained as such served him to continue working as a manager. In 1893, John Shields, one of the founders of the company, rented the central warehouses of a factory in Sant Martí de Provençals to create a branch of his company in Catalonia, which become known as La Escocesa, and Willie Gold, together with around 40 young Scottish workers, was sent over to work in the company's newly opened factory, and Gold was appointed as the supervisor of the factory, a position he held for fifteen years (1893–1908). Whilst out in the Catalan capital, the Scots began playing football against each other to pass the time, to undergo leisure initiatives, and to feel at home. During the winter of 1893–94, he captained the so-called Scottish colony of Sant Martí in a series of matches against the English colony of Barcelona, whose captain was the Englishmen James Reeves. The Barcelona press reported matches between these two sides played on 8 December 1893, 11 March, and 15 April 1894, however, due to the little statistical rigor that the newspapers had at that time, very little is known about those matches, but local historians claim that this was the first ever 'unofficial' rivalry in Spanish football.

This Sant Martí team was the forerunner of the Escocès FC, which was formed by Scottish workers from a factory in Sant Andreu de Palomar in January 1900, and of which Gold was one of the founders. In addition to Gold, this team also had the likes of Peter Mauchan, the Black brothers (Alexander and Joseph), George Girvan and team captain John Hamilton, with all of them except for him going on play for FC Barcelona.

On 11 February 1900, in the match against FC Barcelona, Stanley Harris brought Gold down with a strong tackle, and Gold reacted with an equally strong action, which caused a fight between players of both teams, and as a result, he was sent off, the first time that sanction had been used in Spanish football. Harris did not escape punishment and he was then sent off as well, thus becoming the very first player in Barça's history to be sent off during a match. This incident caused Arthur Witty, Barça's captain in this match, to resign from the position.

Escocès FC had a very short life and was broken up in November of the same year, and Hispania AC took advantage of its dissolution to incorporate several of its most prominent players, such as Gold, J. Black and J. Hamilton. Two months later, Hispania AC organized the first edition of the Copa Macaya in 1901, which was the first football championship played on the Iberian Peninsula, and the forerunner for the Catalan championship which began in 1903. Gold played an important role in helping Hispania become the very first Spanish club to win an official title, netting two goals in a 0–10 trashing of Franco-Española.

He remained loyal to the club until 19 November 1903, the day in which the entity's board agreed to its dissolution due to lack of players. Most of the remaining players, including Hamilton and Black, joined FC Barcelona, but Gold never played football again.

== Honours ==
Hispania AC

- Copa Macaya:
  - Champions: 1900–01
