= Guillermo Busquets =

Spanish architect and footballer

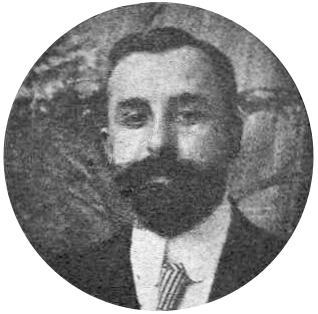
- Guillermo Busquets in 1913
- Born: Guillem Busquets i Vautravers; 23 October 1877; Winterthur, Switzerland
- Died: 1 February 1955 (aged 77); Barcelona, Spain
- Citizenship: Spanish
- Occupations: Architect; Athlete
- Known for: Founder of Català FC and urban designing at the Expo 1929
Association football career
- Full name: Guillermo Busquets Vautravers
- Position: Midfielder
Senior career*
Years	Team	Apps	(Gls)
1899–1900	Català FC		
- * Club domestic league appearances and goals

Guillermo Busquets Vautravers (23 October 1877 – 1 February 1955) was a Spanish architect and footballer who played as a midfielder for Català FC, which he had co-founded. He is best known for his intervention in the urban design of the official section of the 1929 Barcelona International Exposition.

== Footballing career ==
He was born in Barcelona on 23 October 1877, as the son of Erasme Busquets Puigoriol and Marianna Vautravers Rutllan. Football began taking root in Barcelona in the 1890s, and soon it gained followers among the youth of the city. He began to practice this new sport at the Velódromo de la Bonanova with some friends and his brother, José Antonio Busquets. In the spring of 1895, football in Barcelona was already played by several junior and senior teams, and the winning teams were awarded medals, and the Busquet brothers are listed as two of the many Catalans in these teams, featuring alongside the likes of Alberto Serra. They also played a few games for the Sociedad de Foot-Ball de Barcelona in 1895 and 1896, and after the club's collapse, they continued to play football with the Club Regatas team, a club of rowing and sailing, although it is uncertain if they actually sailed.

In 1899, Busquets joined a group of football enthusiasts led by Jaime Vila. On 21 October 1899, this group become the Català Futbol Club, thus becoming the first football team formed in Catalonia, in a meeting held at the Tolosa gym, in which he was present. On the following day, 22 October, they organized their first training with a match between the club's members, including Busquets. All the men involved in that game were Catalans, because in its beginnings, Vila wanted to promote local sport, and thus, it only admitted Catalan players to its team, hence the club's name. Although the club was founded in October, Català was not officially established until 17 December 1899, in a meeting held in the Café San Gervasio de Cassolas, in which they formalized the first board of directors with Jaime Vila being named the club's first president, and Busquets as the club's first vice-captain.

Busquets made his debut in Català's first-ever game, which was held at Bonanova on the Christmas Eve of 1899 against FC Barcelona (only their second-ever game), where he played in midfield in a 0–4 loss. On 6 January 1900, Barcelona and Català agreed to join the best players of each team to face Team Anglès, a team made up of members of the British colony living in Barcelona, and both brothers ousted Barça's player for a spot in the line-up, playing in a 0–3 loss. In March and April, he represented Català in four matches against Escocès FC, which all ended in losses.

== Architect career ==
He graduated on 13 August 1902. As an architect, he was an interior designer for public and tourist buildings and buildings for entertainment and public entertainment, as well as urban planning. He is widely recognized for his intervention together with Josep Puig i Cadafalch in the urban design of the Barcelona International Exhibition of 1929. In 1936 he was required by the Society of Owners of the Gran Teatre del Liceu to issue an opinion on the planned acquisition of two properties on La Rambla.

In 1913 he had been elected councilor of district IV of Barcelona by the Regionalist League and in this capacity, he participated in the municipal report that led to the creation of the Romeu - Porcel urban plan.

=== Relevant works ===
- 1902 - Reform of the doctor Comabella pharmacy. Carrer del Carme 23 (Barcelona)
- 1906 - Casa Solanes (Sant Boi de Llobregat)
- 1906 - House Hurtado. Av. Pedralbes, 46-48 (Barcelona)
- 1908 - Building of the mayor's office, court and medical dispensary (Sant Martí de Provençals, Barcelona)
- 1910 - Girona House (Horta, Barcelona)
- 1910-13 - Casa Giol . Font d'en Fargas, 2-4 (Barcelona)
- 1915 - Pau Monmany housing building. Corner of Mallorca and Sardenia streets (Barcelona)
- 1917 - Together with Josep Puig and Cadafalch, (partial) urbanization of Plaça d'Espanya (Barcelona)
- 1918 - Houses Sanromà (Mataró)
- 1918 - Three single-family houses. Copèrnic, Vallmajor and Raset streets (Barcelona)
- 1918-19 - Severino Izaguirre House (Sant Cugat del Vallès)
- 1923 - Slaughterhouse (Puigcerdà)
- 1924-25 - Madame V. Pouget housing building (Oceja, Upper Cerdany, France)
- 1925-26 - Casa Bonaventura Puig Morer (Puigcerdà)
- 1926 - Two single-family houses. Road from Caldes de Montbui to Sant Celoni (Llinars del Vallès)
- 1926 - Detached house. Carrer Convenio 44 (Barcelona)

== Death ==
Guillermo Busquets died in Barcelona on 1 February 1955, at the age of 77.
