= John Hamilton (footballer, born 1876) =

Spanish footballer (1876–1947)

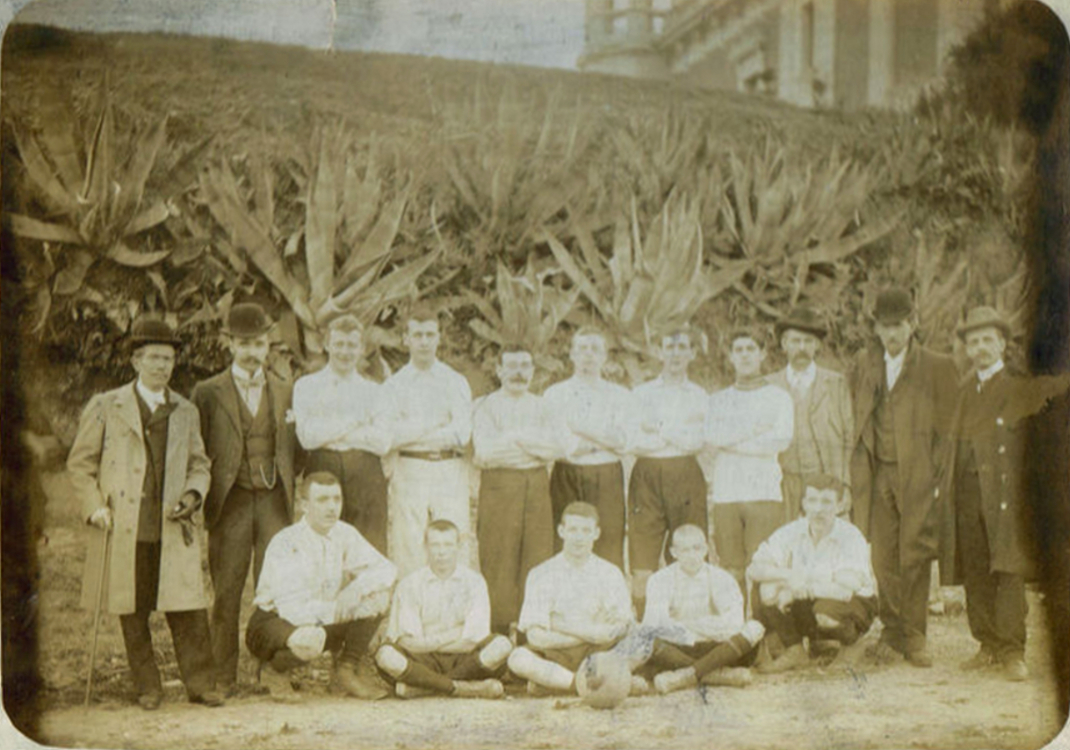
- Players and managers in a snapshot taken around March 1900. Hamilton among them.

Personal information
- Full name: John Hamilton
- Date of birth: 7 February 1876
- Place of birth: Newmilns, East Ayrshire, Scotland
- Date of death: 10 April 1947 (aged 71)
- Place of death: Darvel, East Ayrshire, Scotland
- Positions: Goalkeeper; defender

Senior career*
Years	Team	Apps	(Gls)
1893–1894	Scottish colony of Sant Martí	+3	(0)
1900	Team Anglès	1	(0)
1900	Escocès FC	+7	(0)
1900–1903	Hispania AC		
1904–1905	FC Barcelona		

International career
1903	Barcelona	3	(0)
- * Club domestic league appearances and goals

John Hamilton (7 February 1876 – 10 April 1947) was a Scottish footballer who played as a goalkeeper and defender for Spanish club FC Barcelona.

Although little has been recorded of his life, he was one of the most important figures in the amateur beginnings of football in Catalonia, being noted for his prominent role in promoting football in the city and as the main driving force of Escocès FC, a team made up of Scottish workers from a Sant Andreu factory, which he served as its captain. He was a member of the side that won the first official title in Spanish football, the 1900–01 Copa Macaya with Hispania AC. And in addition to being a player, he was also a referee, overseeing at least one match in the 1900–01 Copa Macaya, tens of Catalan championship games, the 1912 Copa del Rey Final, and being the first president of the Catalan Referees' Association in 1902.

== Early life ==
John Hamilton was born in Newmilns, East Ayrshire, on 7 February 1876. At some point in the early 1890s, he became an employee at lace manufacturers Johnston, Shields & Co in Glasgow. In 1893, he was one of around 40 young Scottish workers who was sent over to work in the company's newly opened factory at Sant Martí de Provençals, known in Catalonia as La Escocesa.

== Playing career ==
=== Escocès FC ===
Whilst out in the Catalan capital, Hamilton developed a deep interest in football, which he played in his free time with his friends and co-workers. During the winter of 1893–94, he took part in some of the first football matches played in the Catalan capital, when he featured in clashes between the Scottish Colony of Sant Martí and the English Colony of Barcelona. Local historians claim that this was the first ever 'unofficial' rivalry in Spanish football. The Barcelona press reported matches between these two sides played on 8 December 1893, 11 March, and 15 April 1894, however, due to the little statistical rigor that the newspapers had at that time, very little is known about those matches, and thus the number of goals he scored (if any) remains unclear. During this period, Hamilton stood out as a great goal scorer, but as he aged he moved on to play as a goalkeeper. He also stood out for his strong character on the pitch and great leadership skills, which would later earn him the captaincy of Escocès FC.

This Sant Martí team was the forerunner of the Escocès FC, which was formed by Scottish workers from a factory in Sant Andreu de Palomar in January 1900, and of which Hamilton was one of the founders. He and defender Jim Dykes were the only members of this group who had previously played an official match in the city, having covered the losses of Team Anglès in a match against FC Barcelona on 6 January 1900, keeping a clean-sheet in a 3–0 win. As such, and also due to his higher experience and leadership skills, Hamilton was named the team's captain in a time when the captain had the duty of dictating the tactics to be followed (since the coach as we know him today did not exist back then) and was in charge of orienting the team and making up the line-ups. In addition to Hamilton and Dykes, this team also had the likes of Willie Gold, Peter Mauchan, the Black brothers (Alexander and Joseph) and Geordie Girvan, with all of them, except for Gold, going on to play for FC Barcelona. This team played ten friendlies in 1900 against the likes of Barça, Català FC and Hispania AC, and he started in 9 of them, six as the goalkeeper and three as a defender, missing one game only because he was the referee of that match, which was against FC Catalá on 25 February 1900, ending in a 1–5 win for the Scots.

In a match against FC Barcelona on 11 February, Escocès started with only 10 men, and the superiority of the Blaugrana team was such that they played throughout the first half of the game within the field of their opponents, which inevitably allowed Hamilton the opportunity to shine, as he put up a spectacular performance and electrified the stands with his brilliant stops that the public applauded with enthusiasm. Despite his heroics, however, 10-men Escocès FC still lost 0–4. Due to his experience as an outfield player from his years as a forward and defender, he would often briefly leave his goal to push his team forward, similar to the modern-day Sweeper-keeper.

=== Hispania AC ===
In November 1900, Escocés FC folded and Hispania AC took advantage of its dissolution to incorporate several of its most prominent players, such as Hamilton, Gold, and J. Black, while Mauchan, Girvan, and A. Black joined FC Barcelona. Two months later, Hispania AC organized the first edition of the Copa Macaya in 1901, which was the first football championship played on the Iberian Peninsula, and the forerunner for the Catalan championship which began in 1903. Hamilton missed the opening match of the tournament against FC Barcelona on 27 January 1901 due to being ill. With Hispania, Hamilton was forced to play as a right-sided defender, owing to the club already having an established goalkeeper, Samuel Morris, who had also played for Team Anglès in 1899. However, he actually thrived in his new role and enjoyed a great goalscoring form, netting 7 goals in total, although six of them came in a 14–0 trashing of Franco-Española. His seven goals saw him finish as the fourth highest top scorer of the tournament behind John Parsons (8), Green (9) and Joan Gamper (31).

Together with captain Gustavo Green, Black, and Morris, Hamilton played a pivotal role in helping Hispania become the very first Spanish club to win an official title. In the decisive game against Barcelona on 14 April, Hispania only needed a draw to win the title, and it was partly thanks to the defensive partnership of Hamilton and Gold that they managed to resist Barça's intense siege in an eventual 1–1 draw. In the chronicle of this match published a week later on Los Deportes, it was stated that "in the second half, Hispania changed the position of some players, moving Mr. Hamilton to forward, undoubtedly believing that with his play, he would be able to score the decisive goal or a few more, which he could not achieve thanks to the backs and half-backs of Barcelona".

Interestingly, Hamilton was involved in another 14–0 trashing of Franco-Española at the tournament, but this time as a referee, and this one being perpetuated by Barcelona at Hotel Casanovas, thus holding the peculiar distinction of participating in the Copa Macaya as both a player and a referee.

=== FC Barcelona ===
Hamilton remained loyal to the club until 19 November 1903, the day on which the entity's board agreed to its dissolution due to a lack of players. Most of the remaining players, including Hamilton and Black, joined FC Barcelona, thus becoming one of the first Scottish players to wear the Barça shirt along with his fellow Escocès FC teammates. Despite the absence of Samuel, Hamilton kept playing as a defender, and he also kept thriving in that position, and together with the likes of José Quirante, Romà Forns, Udo Steinberg and Carles Comamala, he helped Barça win the 1904–05 Catalan championship.

=== International career ===
In 1903, Hamilton played several friendly matches between teams made up of the best players in Barcelona, contesting the position of goalkeeper with the likes of Joaquim Carril, Emilio Rudolf Gass, and Arthur Witty. On 24 September 1903, he played in a test match between two "Barcelona teams" that was meant to decide who would integrate the first selection of the Catalonia national team the following year.

== Refereeing career ==
Hamilton began his refereeing career in 1900, when he was still an active player at Escocès FC, overseeing one of the games of the said club against Català FC on 25 February 1900. He then oversaw a Copa Macaya match between Barcelona and Franco-Española on 7 April 1901. On 23 November, he officiated a friendly between Barcelona and the officers of the British cruise ship HS Calliope, which ended in a 4–0 win to the former. In 1902 the Official College of Catalan Referees was created by Catalan Football Federation, and Hamilton of Hispania was elected as the entity's first-ever president. He also refereed two matches in the Copa Barcelona, both between Barcelona and Club Español, and both ending in 2–2 draws, which just happen to be the only matches that Barça failed to win in that tournament.

After ending his playing career in 1904, Hamilton became a referee full-time, whose most important task was to referee the matches of the Catalan championship, and if available, the Copa del Rey. In fact, he refereed tens of championship matches, and in 1912, aged 36, he was the referee of the Copa del Rey Final between FC Barcelona and Sociedad Gimnástica, which ended in a 2–0 victory in favor of his former club.

== Death ==
Hamilton died in Darvel, East Ayrshire on 10 April 1947, at the age of 71.

== Honours ==
Hispania AC

- Copa Macaya:
  - Champions: 1900–01

FC Barcelona

- Catalan championship:
  - Champions: 1904–05
