= 1900–01 Copa Macaya =

Tournament details
- Country: Catalonia
- Teams: 6

Final positions
- Champions: Hispania AC (1st title)
- Runner-up: FC Barcelona

Tournament statistics
- Matches played: 13
- Goals scored: 96 (7.38 per match)
- Top goal scorer(s): Joan Gamper (31 goals)

The 1900–01 Copa Macaya was the 1st staging of the Copa Macaya. This tournament is best known for being the very first football competition played on the Iberian Peninsula. The competition was held on the road between 20 January 1901 and ended on 14 April, and it was won by Hispania AC, narrowly beating FC Barcelona by just two points.

== Overview ==
In December 1900, Alfonso Macaya, the then president of Hispania AC, offered a trophy (the Copa Macaya) to the winners of a tournament played on the road featuring six teams from Catalonia: FC Barcelona (1899), Hispania AC (1900), Club Tarragona, Sociedad Franco-Española (1900), Club Espanyol (now RCD Espanyol), and SD Santanach (1900). However, the latter dissolved in the mid-time, with most of its players joining Espanyol, who themselves withdrew from the tournament after the fourth game, thus being disqualified. A committee consisting of Thomas Shields, Ernest Witty and Urruela was formed, which would be in charge of appointing the referees and resolving any problems that might arise during the competition.

The pre-favourites to win the competition were the Barça team because at that time they had great international figures such as John Parsons, the Witty brothers (Arthur and Ernest) and team captain Joan Gamper, with the latter netting a whopping 31 goals in just 6 matches, including two 9-goal hauls and an 8-goal haul. Hispania AC, the organizers of the tournament, was also taken as a contender for the title, having the likes of Carlos Soley, the Morris brothers (Enrique and Samuel) and team captain Gustavo Green, who scored 9 goals including 7 in two matches against Franco. Furthermore, both teams had greatly improved their squads with the recruitment of the best players of the newly dissolved Escocès FC, a team made up mostly of Scottish workers from a factory in Sant Martí de Provençals. This meant a big leap in quality for both clubs, as Barça recruited George Girvan, Peter Mauchan and Alexander Black, while Hispania acquired Joseph Black, Willie Gold and the team's captain and goalkeeper John Hamilton, who played as a defender due to the club already having an established goalkeeper, Samuel Morris. Interestingly, all of those Scots managed to score at least one goal in the tournament, with both Blacks netting 5 goals each, while Hamilton thrived in his new role at Hispania and enjoyed a great goalscoring form, netting 7 goals in total, although six of them come in a 14–0 trashing of Franco, and Girvan netted the very first competitive goal in Barcelona's history in the first match of the Copa Macaya on 20 January.

On 20 January, the tournament began with a match between the two favorites Barcelona and Hispania, held at the former's home ground (a field in front of the Hotel Casanovas), but despite home ground advantage, it was Hispania who won 2–1 after coming back with two goals from their captain, Gustavo Green. This result proved to be decisive in the outcome of the tournament since the rest of the participating teams basically played a "formality role", as Barcelona and Hispania beat them all with thrashings (both teams beat Franco 14–0 at home), thus the title was only decided when they met again, now at Hispania's home ground, on the last matchday on 14 April, with Hispania having 14 points against Barcelona's 12, thus if the latter achieved victory, the title would have to be decided with a tiebreaker, a play-off. In the first half, Hispania went ahead thanks to an own goal from an undetermined Barcelona player, and then managed to resist Barça's siege largely thanks to their goalkeeper, Samuel Morris, who conceded a goal from Gamper in the second half, which was too little too late and the game ended in a 1–1 tie, which proved to be enough for Hispania to become the first Catalan champion in history. But this historic meeting was not without controversy, since the referee annulled a second goal from Barcelona (scored by John Parsons) for offside, a decision that was heavily contested, with Barça claiming bias refereeing in favor of the organizers of the tournament.

Other notable results include 13–0 and 18–0 trashings of Barça over Franco-Española and Club Tarragona respectevely, in which Gamper netted a resounding 9 goals in each game. Barcelona then trashed Franco again 14–0 in a game that lasted only 60 minutes, with Gamper scoring "only" 8 this time. Coincidentally, Hispania also beat Franco by a score of 14–0, with 6 goals from Hamilton, and a hat-trick from both Green and Black.

Naturally, as it was the first contest to be held in Spain, debuts were a common thing, and on 10 February, in a match between Club Tarragona and Espanyol, the former played their first official match since until that date it had only played training matches among teammates, with some of its members having gone to Barcelona beforehand to watch some matches and find out about the rules of this sport. Furthermore, Espanyol became the first team from Barcelona to travel outside the province of Barcelona when they went to Tarragona to face said opponent.

On 10 March 1901, Espanyol faced Hispania in a match that turned out to be a real disaster. The referee did not show up and the ground at Muntaner, which was making its official debut (until then Frare Blanch), had a slight incline at various points; the goal frames fell twice, two Espanyol players had to leave the field of play due to injuries, and in the face of such an accumulation of nonsense, Espanyol chose to leave the field before the end of the match, thinking of raising a protest against the competition committee, but they gave up from the idea knowing that the committee would always rule in favor of Hispania. The last straw came a few days later against Franco, when the referee failed to show up for Espanyol's fixture again, and being this the second time it happened along with the incidents of their match with Hispania, Espanyol decides to withdraw from the tournament.

== Table ==
Pos	Team	Pld	W	D	L	GF	GA	GD	Pts	Qualification or relegation
1	Hispania AC	8	7	1	0	39	2	+37	15	Champion
2	FC Barcelona	8	6	1	1	51	4	+47	13	
3	Espanyol (Note: Espanyol retired after the fourth game. All their opponents until the end of the tournament were awarded with a victory.)	8	3	0	5	6	6	0	6	
4	Club Tarragona (Note: Tarragona didn't play at Franco-Española, awarded with a victory.)	8	2	0	6	0	30	−30	4	
5	Franco-Española (Note: Franco-Española didn't play at Tarragona, awarded with a victory.)	8	1	0	7	0	54	−54	2	
6	Santanach (WD) (Note: Santanach withdrew before the tournament.)	0	0	0	0	0	0	0	0	

Source: Copa
Rules for classification: 1) points; 2) head-to-head points; 3) head-to-head goal difference; 4) goal difference; 5) number of goals scored; 6) fair-play points; 7) playoff match

== Results ==
20 January 1901	FC Barcelona	1–2	Hispania AC	Barcelona
	George Girvan	Report	Gustavo Green	Stadium: Hotel Casanovas; Referee: John Henry Ball

27 January 1901	FC Barcelona	4–1	Espanyol	Barcelona
	Joan Gamper 1–1', 2–1', 3–1', 4–1'	Report	Munné 0–1'	Stadium: Hotel Casanovas; Referee: Kings

27 January 1901	Franco-Española	0–10	Hispania AC	Barcelona
		Report	Joseph Black; Willie Gold; Gustavo Green; John Hamilton; Enrique Morris	Stadium: Campo del Franco-Española

3 February 1901	Franco-Española	0–3	Espanyol	Barcelona
		Report	?	Stadium: Campo del Franco-Española

10 February 1901	Franco-Española	0–13	FC Barcelona	Barcelona
		Report	Joan Gamper (9); George Girvan; John Parsons	Stadium: Campo del Franco-Española; Referee: Kings
Note: This was the first match between these two sides. Also, Barcelona scored 15 goals but two of them were annulled due to offside.

10 February 1901	Tarragona	0–2	Espanyol	Tarragona
		Report	Miguel Bernat; Joaquin Sanchez	Stadium: Velodrome; Referee: Carlos Soley (Hispania player)

24 February 1901	Tarragona	0–5	Hispania AC	Tarragona
		Report	Miguel Sanmartín; Alejandro Leigh; Willie Gold	Stadium: Velodrome

3 March 1901	Hispania AC	14–0	Franco-Española	Barcelona
	Joseph Black; Gustavo Green; John Hamilton (6); Fermín Lomba; Enrique Morris	Report		Stadium: Frare Blanch; Referee: Alberto Serra

3 March 1901	Tarragona	Awarded to Barça	FC Barcelona	Barcelona
		Report		Stadium: Hotel Casanovas
Note: The 2 points at stake were awarded to Barcelona as Tarragona did not show up most likely due to the stage fright that the Hispania peregrines had instilled in them during their previous visit to Tarragona.

10 March 1901	Hispania AC	2–0	Espanyol	Barcelona
		Report		Stadium: Camp del carrer Muntaner; Referee: Kings

17 March 1901	Tarragona	0–18	FC Barcelona	Tarragona
		Report	Alexander Black; Joan Gamper (9); Peter Mauchan; John Parsons; Bartomeu Terradas; Arthur Witty	Stadium: Velodrome; Referee: Alberto Chaperón

19 March 1901	Espanyol	Not held	Franco-Española	Barcelona
		Report		Stadium: Camp del carrer Muntaner
Note: Franco's team did not show up and nor did the appointed referee, and so, after the incidents of his match against Hispania and being the second time that the referee did not appear on his field, Espanyol decided to withdraw from the competition.

24 March 1901	Hispania AC	5–0	Tarragona	Barcelona
	Miguel Sanmartín; Fermín Lomba; Enrique Morris; Julià García	Report		Stadium: Camp del carrer Muntaner; Referee: William Mauchan (FC Barcelona player)

31 March 1901	Tarragona	Awarded to Tarragona	Franco-Española	Tarragona
		Report		Stadium: Velodrome
Note: The contest has lost all its interest since only Hispania and Barcelona had the possibility of winning the title, and since at the time teams could not afford to make useless expenses, Franco did not appear in the Tarragona field, so the two points are awarded to Tarragona.

7 April 1901	FC Barcelona	14–0	Franco-Española	Barcelona
	Alexander Black; Joan Gamper (8); John Parsons; Arthur Witty	Report		Stadium: Hotel Casanovas; Referee: John Hamilton (Hispania player)
Note: The match only lasted 60 minutes

8 April 1901	Franco-Española	Awarded to Franco	Tarragona	Barcelona
		Report		Stadium: Campo del Franco-Española
Note: Returning the courtesy that Franco had in his non-visit to Tarragona's field, this time it was Tarragona who did not appear in Franco's field, who thus obtained their only 2 points.

14 April 1901 Decisive match	Hispania AC	1–1	FC Barcelona	Barcelona
	? 1–0' (o.g.)	Report	Joan Gamper 1–1'	Stadium: Camp del carrer Muntaner; Referee: William Mauchan (FC Barcelona player)
Note: Barcelona got two goals but the second was annulled because, according to the referee, the ball did not cross the goal line. Also, the kick-off was made by the president of the tournament's Committee, Thomas Shields.

== Statistics ==
=== Top Scorers ===
Rank	Player	Team	Goals
1	Joan Gamper	FC Barcelona	31
2	Gustavo Green	Hispania AC	9
3	John Parsons	FC Barcelona	8
4	John Hamilton	Hispania AC	7
5	Joseph Black	Hispania AC	5
5	Alexander Black	FC Barcelona	5
6	Enrique Morris	Hispania AC	4
6	Willie Gold	Hispania AC	4
7	Arthur Witty	FC Barcelona	3

Source: RSSSF

== Trophy ==
Many believed that the prize of the contest would correspond to the importance that some gave it with statements of "valuable artistic cup", or "magnificent gold cup", but they were left disappointed when they saw it was just a normal cup. The long duration of the contest (3 months), the constitution of a Committee, the travel expenses that the clubs were forced to incur were sufficient reasons to believe that the value and richness of the cup was true.

== See also ==
- Copa Macaya
- Catalan football championship
- 1902 Copa de la Coronación
- 1900–01 FC Barcelona season
