= Enrique Morris =

Spanish footballer

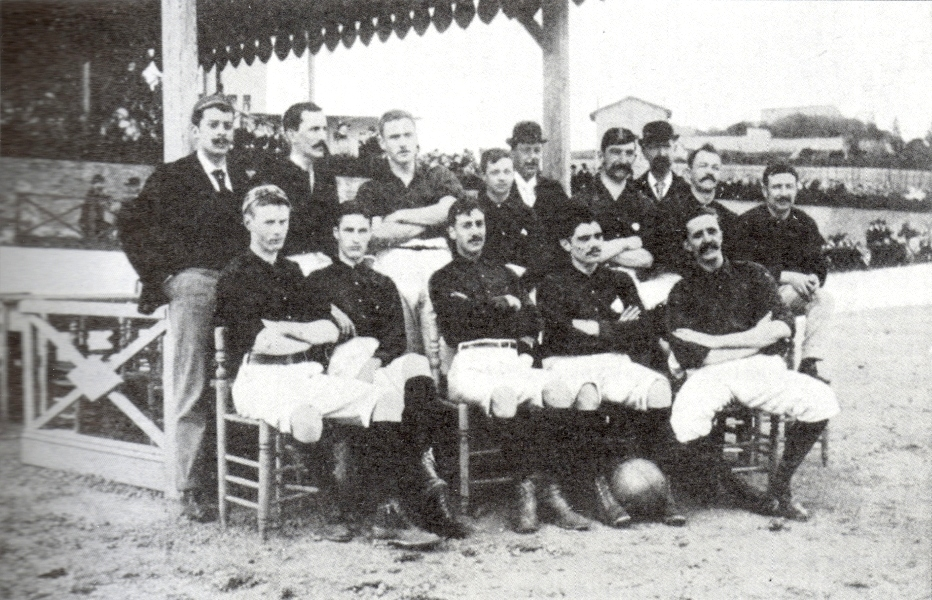
- Enrique Morris (standing, the fourth from the left) in 1895

Personal information
- Full name: Enrique Ramón Morris de Olea
- Date of birth: 16 June 1876
- Place of birth: Manila, Philippines, Spain
- Date of death: Unknown
- Place of death: Barcelona, Catalonia, Spain
- Position: Forward

Senior career*
Years	Team	Apps	(Gls)
1892–1894	Barcelona Football Club		
1895–1896	Sociedad de Foot-Ball de Barcelona		
1900–1902	Hispania AC		
1902	FC Barcelona	2	(0)
1902–1903	Hispania AC		
1903–1905	FC Barcelona	8	(3)
1909–1910	Star FC		
- * Club domestic league appearances and goals

Enrique Ramón Morris de Olea, also known as Henry Morris or Morris II (16 June 1876 – Unknown), was an Anglo-Filipino football pioneer and a prominent forward for FC Barcelona. His brothers, Samuel and Miguel, also played football, and together with them, he was one of the first pioneers of football in Catalonia, participating in some of the first football matches of the city and playing for several experimental teams in the 1890s such as the Sociedad de Foot-Ball de Barcelona.

In the early 1900s, he was a member of the Hispania AC side that won the 1900–01 Copa Macaya, which was the very first football competition played on the Iberian Peninsula, and a member of the Barça side that reached the final of the 1902 Copa de la Coronación.

== Early life ==
Enrique Morris was born in 1874 in Manila, when the Philippines was a Spanish province, as the third child of a marriage formed by two emigrants, the English businessman and engineer Samuel James Morris Campbell (1842–1909) and María del Socorro de Olea y Marabea (1852–1877), a teenager of Basque origin.

In 1886 the family moved to Barcelona, where his father had been assigned to run the Barcelona Tramways Company Limited. On the grounds near the Hippodrome of Can Tunis, their father taught his three sons, Samuel, Enrique (Henry), and Miguel (Júnior) to play football, a sport that was practically unknown in the city at the time.

== Playing career ==
=== Barcelona Cricket Club ===
Together with his older brother, Samuel, he was one of the first pioneers of football in Catalonia, being part of the first known club to have played football in the city, the Barcelona Cricket Club, which his father and Samuel, among other Britons, had founded in 1891, since at the time it was common to play cricket in the summer and then football in the winter. Samuel and his father then helped founding the Barcelona Football Club in late 1892, which held the first known football match in the city at Hippodrome of Can Tunis on 25 December 1892. The two of them along with their younger brother, Miguel, appeared in what is regarded to be the oldest photograph of a football team in Spain, taken on 12 March 1893.

=== Sociedad de Foot-Ball de Barcelona ===
In late 1894, Morris joined the Barcelona Football Club, which had now changed its name to Sociedad de Foot-Ball de Barcelona. On 27 January 1895, he was one of 16 footballers who featured in the first football match played at Bonanova, and although it is not specified in which position he played, he scored once to help the Blues to a 1–4 win over a Red side that featured his older brother Samuel. He also played against teams from Sant Martí and Torelló, scoring once against the latter on 24 March 1895, thus helping his side to an 8–3 victory.

Following the departure of James Reeves, the club's captain and leader, the Barcelona Football Society declined and disappeared around 1896. The city then went through a period of lack of interest in football, and for this reason, no Briton played football in Spain (that we know of) in 1897 and 1898. Together with the Parsons brothers (John and William), the Morris played an important role in the return of football to the city by contributing to the emergence of Team Anglès, a team made up of members of the British colony living in Barcelona.

=== Hispania AC ===
E. Morris, though very young in appearance, his game is that of the consummate master. He has a peculiar way of driving the ball and even charging the opponent.

— Alberto Serra in January 1902.

In October 1900, Enrique, Samuel, and their father took part in the foundation of Hispania AC. Together with John Parsons and captain Gustavo Green, the Morris brothers, Samuel as a goalkeeper and Enrique as a forward, played a pivotal role in helping Hispania AC become the very first Spanish club to win an official title, the 1900–01 Copa Macaya, which was the first football competition played on the Iberian Peninsula. Morris finished the tournament with two goals, one each in 0–10 and 14–0 trashings of Franco-Española. Their youngest brother Miguel eventually joined them in Hispania in 1901.

=== FC Barcelona ===
During their time in Hispania, the three Morris brothers joined the ranks of FC Barcelona on two occasions: the first on the occasion of the match against the officers of the British cruise ship HS Calliope on 23 November 1901, where they helped Barça to a 4–0 victory, and the second in May of 1902, when they reinforced FC Barcelona during its participation in the Copa de la Coronación (predecessor of Copa del Rey). Enrique played alongside Miguel in the semifinals against Real Madrid CF (then known as Madrid FC), which was the very first El Clásico in history, and then all three of them played in the final, where Barça was beaten 2–1 by Club Vizcaya (a combination of players from Athletic Club and Bilbao Football Club). In doing so, they became the first-ever Filipinos to play for FC Barcelona, ahead of the likes of Manuel Amechazurra and Paulino Alcántara.

After this parenthesis with Barça, the Morris brothers continued to play at Hispania AC until 1903, when the club was dissolved for lack of players, but while Samuel retired due to his advanced age, Enrique and Miguel joined FC Barcelona permanently, playing for the club for two years until 1905, and helping Barça win the Catalan championship in 1904–05. In total, he played 4 official matches for Barcelona and scored two goals in the 1904–05 season.

Later, in the 1909–10 season, he participated in the First Category Championship of Catalonia with the modest Star FC, becoming its captain and later being joined by Miguel.

== Death ==
Morris fought in the First World War as a pilot in the British Royal Air Corps, being shot down and wounded in the abdomen while strafing German positions, although he survived and returned to Spain. The date of his death is unknown.

== Honours ==
Hispania AC

- Copa Macaya:
  - Champions: 1900–01

FC Barcelona

- Catalan championship
  - Champions: 1904–05
- Copa de la Coronación:
  - Runner-up: 1902
