= Català FC =

Football club in Spain active between 1899 and 1928

Català Futbol Club
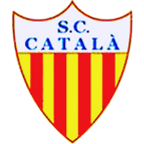
- Short name: Català FC
- Founded: 17 December 1899; 126 years ago
- Dissolved: late 1920s
- Ground: Velódromo de la Bonanova
- League: Catalan championship
| Home colours | Away colours | Third colours |

Català Futbol Club, and later Català Sport Club, was a football team based in Barcelona, Spain, which existed from 1899 until its dissolution in the late 1920s. It was one of the most important entities in the amateur beginnings of football in Catalonia, being noted for its prominent role in promoting local football in the city. Català is best known for being the first unofficial football team to be formed in the city of Barcelona, although officially it comes second behind FC Barcelona, with whom they had a very strong rivalry at the turn of the century.

== Origins ==
Catalonia was introduced to football by two distinct groups with British connections: British workers and Catalan students returning from schools in Britain. In the late 19th century, Catalonia enjoyed the most developed industry in the country, thus attracting many migrant workers, especially Britons, who like in the rest of the world, brought football with them. This new sport began taking root in the city in the 1890s, and soon gained followers among members belonging to the Gymnasium Tolosa (run by Eduardo Tolosa), such as Jaime Vila Capdevila, a native of Lleida and a lover of sport and physical culture who worked there as a gym teacher. On 21 October 1899, a group of football enthusiasts from the gymnasium led by Vila, founded the Català Futbol Club, thus becoming the first unofficial football team formed in Catalonia. (Note: Some of them were Sanmartín, Ortiz, Lomba, Santaló, Soler, Degollada, Gispert, Rossell, Marques, Molina, Sayé, Labárta, Matas, Garcés.)

Although the club was founded in October, Català was not officially established until 17 December 1899, in a meeting held in the Café San Gervasio de Cassolas, in which they formalized the first board of directors with Jaime Vila being named the club's first president, in addition to Víctor Manuel Paniagua as secretary and Miguel Valdés as treasurer, while Manel Mir was appointed the team captain and Guillermo Busquets the vice-captain. The colors of the club was also chosen in this meeting, a white and blue shirt with white pants. On 10 January 1903, the name of the club changed to Català Sport Club, when members of the recently Club Universitari joined the club.

== Rivalry with FC Barcelona ==
Joan Gamper, who had already founded other clubs in his home country, Zürich, wanted to do the same in his new city, Barcelona, and his initial idea was to join the group of football fans led by Vila that ended up creating Català FC, but Gamper was rejected for being a foreigner, because in its beginnings, Català wanted to promote the local sport, and thus, it only admitted Catalan players to its team. Two months after its foundation, however, Català accepted its first foreign players. This rejection is why Gamper went on to found FC Barcelona on 29 November 1899, in the Gimnasio Solé, thus initiating a tough rivalry with Català that was even transferred to the journalistic media, with the polemics about who was the first official club of Barcelona (the club dean of the city) finishing when Barça proved that they had been the first club to be registered in the civil registry on 29 November, only a few days before Català FC, who did it on 17 December.

They faced each other for the first time on the Christmas Eve of 1899, which ended in a 3–1 victory in favor of Barça, the club's first-ever victory, and to add salt to injury, it was Gamper who netted twice to seal the win. Just two days after this match, however, these two sides joined the best players of each team in order to face Team Anglès, a team made up of members of the British colony living in Barcelona, and together they won 2–1 with another brace from Gamper, and they repeated this scenario again on 6 January 1900, this time losing 3–0. The only Català players who featured in both games were Carlos Soley, Fermín Lomba, and Manuel Mir.

On 11 February, six players from Escocès FC reinforced Català in a match against Barcelona, being this the first time they played with foreigners. However, this match is remembered for a different reason. After Català's Scot Willie Gold was brought down by Barça's Englishman Stanley Harris with a strong tackle, Gold reacted with an equally strong action, punching him in the face, which started a fight between the players of both teams. For this reason, the referee William Mauchan sent off Gold, the very first red card shown in Spanish football. Harris was also sent off as well, thus becoming the very first player in Barça's history to be sent off during a match. This incident led Barcelona to refuse to play any team with Scottish players in their ranks for a year, if an apology was not received, but both Català and Escocès refused to do so, stating that those players are members of Català, and therefore, the rest of the 1899–1900 season was just confrontations between Escocès and Català. Between 25 February and 29 April, Català faced the Scots six times, and six times Català lost. However, some of the Escocès players kept playing for both teams in a very short space of time, such as Gustavo Green and Joseph Black (the local press even began mocking these Scots by calling them 'taxi-footballers'), and naturally, some of the Català players were unhappy about this, and eventually, this led to a conflict between the club's members, which caused some of them to leave and found a new club in May 1900, called Team Rojo, which later became Hispania Athletic Club. It was common at the time for players to leave their respective teams to join or found others due to the still dispersed and confusing growth of football. Following a 3-month hiatus without playing (Feb - May), Barcelona finally played again on 24 May against Team Rojo, a team formed by a group of dissident players of Català, their established city rivals.

== Dispute over Bonanova ==
The Velódromo de la Bonanova became the first playing field of the first two clubs officially founded in Barcelona: Català FC and FC Barcelona. Being a rental field, the two dean clubs of Catalonia had to share this venue, together with other groups in the city. The members of the Tolosa Gym that founded Català FC had begun using the ex-velodrome for their rehearsals on 22 October, and a few weeks later, on the Christmas Eve of 1899, the venue hosted the very first match between these two clubs. Bonanova was the home ground of FC Barcelona for nine months, until Català reached an agreement with the owners to exclusively rent it, forcing their rivals to move to Hotel Casanova. Barcelona played their last match at the Bonanova on 23 September 1900, precisely against Català FC, which was also the first match of the 1900–01 season. The Barcelona team won 3–1 with goals from Gamper and Otto Maier, thus winning the club's first-ever piece of silverware: An art object made of bronze.

== Copa Macaya ==
As one of the oldest clubs in Catalonia, Català FC could have been a member of the very first competition held in the Iberian Peninsula, the Copa Macaya in 1900–01 Copa Macaya, but they withdrew from it presumably due to its still amateur preparation compared to that of FC Barcelona's. In the following year, however, they participated in the 1901–02 Copa Macaya, but only got one point as they finished last. During the tournament, they were trashed by Barcelona both home and away (12–0 and 0–15), with the latter coming in the last matchday to seal the title to Barça, which was the first official title in their rival's history.

== Decline and Collapse ==
Català FC contested the championship of Catalonia from its beginnings, without ever achieving the title. Their best classification was a second-place finish in the 1910–11 season and two third-place finishes (1903–04 and 1906–07). The 1914–15 season ended in the tenth and last position, losing the first category that it never regained.

Català continued to play in the Bonanova until the end of 1910, the year in which the venue was demolished. In October 1919, the club moved to some land in Cornellà de Llobregat and went on to compete in the Llobregat championship. Català SC disappeared at the end of the 1920s.

== Football kit ==
The colors of his clothing were blue and white.

| 1899-1901 | 1902-1909 | 1910-1911 | 1912 |

== See also ==
- Football in Catalonia
- Escocès FC
