= Stanley Charles Harris =

English footballer

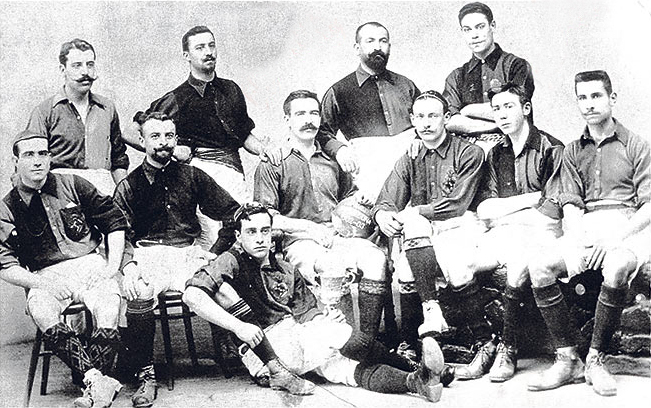
- Harris (seated, second to right) in 1903

Personal information
- Full name: Stanley Charles Harris
- Date of birth: 1884
- Place of birth: Scotland
- Date of death: 31 January 1909 (aged 24)
- Position: Forward

Youth career
- Craven School XI

Senior career*
Years	Team	Apps	(Gls)
1899	Team Anglès		
1899–1901	FC Barcelona		
1901–1902	Barça B	9	(4)
1902–1906	FC Barcelona		
Total		68	(20)
- * Club domestic league appearances and goals

Stanley Charles Harris (1884 – 31 January 1909) was an English footballer who played as a forward for Spanish club FC Barcelona. He is best known for being the very first player in Barça's history to have been sent off during a match.

== Playing career ==
Stanley Harris was born in Scotland, and in his native country he gained experience playing at Craven School in North Yorkshire. FC Barcelona made its official debut on 8 December 1899, and Harris actually played for the rival team, Team Anglès, a team made up of members of the British colony living in Barcelona, featuring alongside the two Parsons brothers (John and William), which had been among the founder of the club two weeks earlier, on 29 November. Harris joined Barça on 13 December, only five days after that match.

On 11 February 1900, in the match against a combination of the best players of FC Català and Escocès FC, Harris brought down Scottish player Willie Gold with a strong tackle. Gold's reaction caused a fight between players of both teams, and as a result, he was sent off, the first time that sanction had been used in Spanish football. Harris did not escape punishment - he was then sent-off as well, thus becoming the very first player in Barça's history to be sent off during a match. This incident caused Arthur Witty, Barça's captain in this match, to resign from the position.

In the following year, Harris was a member of the Barcelona side that participated in the first edition of the Copa Macaya, which was the first football championship played on the Iberian Peninsula, and the forerunner for the Catalan championship which began in 1903, but despite his best efforts, Barça finished as runner-ups to Hispania AC.

In the 1901–02 season, he was part of Barça's second team, with which he won a local tournament, the Medal of the Spanish Gymnastics Federation, playing 9 games and scoring 4 goals.

Together with Arthur Witty, Romà Forns, José Quirante and Carles Comamala, he helped Barcelona win the 1904–05 Catalan championship. He remained loyal to the club for seven years, playing a total of 59 matches and netting 16 goals.
