= Gustavo Green =

Spanish footballer

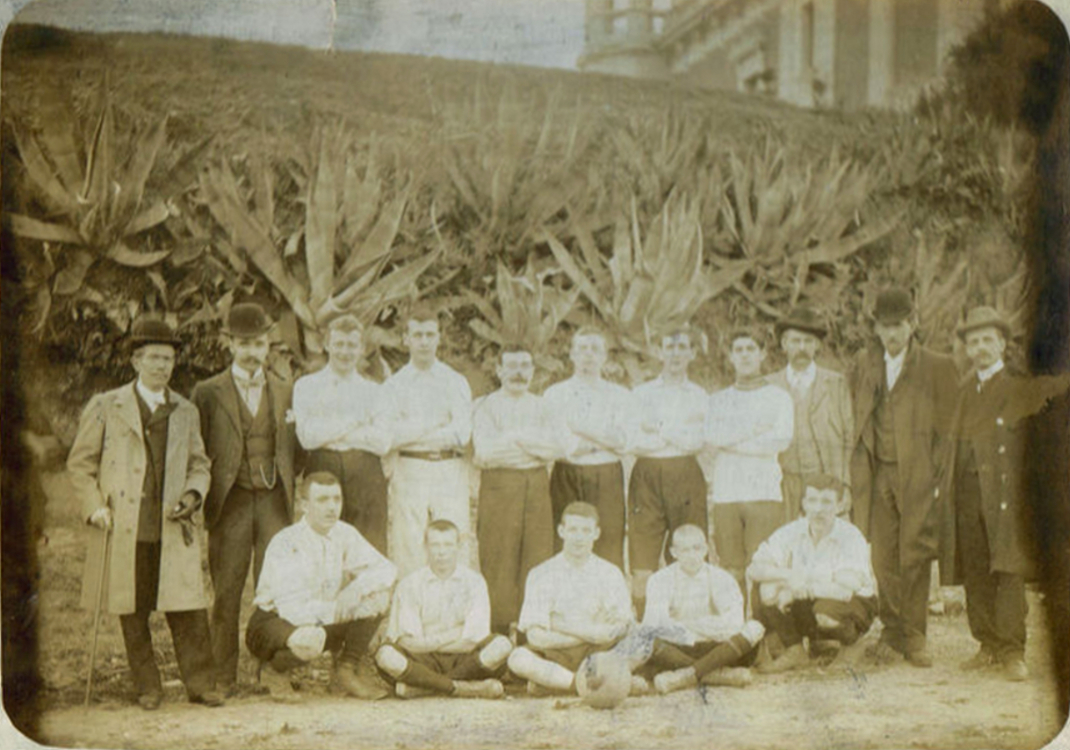
- Green (standing fourth to the right, with a scarf) in 1900

Personal information
- Full name: Gustavo Gren Córdoba
- Date of birth: 10 May 1880
- Place of birth: Málaga, Andalusia, Spain
- Date of death: 9 November 1965 (aged 85)
- Place of death: Bilbao, Spain
- Position: Forward

Senior career*
Years	Team	Apps	(Gls)
03/1900	Escocès FC	0	(0)
04/1900	Català FC		
1900	Team Roig		
1900–1901	Hispania AC		
1901–1902	FC Barcelona	+4	(0)
1902–1905	Club Español	+16	(8)
1906	FC Barcelona	+1	(0)
1908–1912	Club Español	+6	(0)

International career
1903	Barcelona	2	(1)
1904	Catalonia	3	(0)
- * Club domestic league appearances and goals

Gustavo Gren Córdoba (10 May 1880 – 9 November 1965), better known as Gustavo Green, was a Spanish footballer who played as a forward for FC Barcelona and RCD Espanyol.

After spending his childhood in a south London neighborhood, he settled in Barcelona and began playing friendlies with Escocès FC, Català FC, and Team Roig. He was captain of the side that won the very first official title in Spanish football, the 1900–01 Copa Macaya with Hispania AC. He won all three editions of the Copa Macaya with three different clubs (Hispania AC, Barça and Español), being the only one to do so. He was thus the first great star of Catalan football as well as one of the first great forwards of Barcelona and RCD Espanyol (then Club Español), netting over 100 for them between 1911 and 1910, although this tally includes goals scored in friendlies and unofficial games.

== Early life ==
Gustavo Gren was born on 10 May 1880 in Málaga to a German father and a Spanish mother, but it was in Catalonia where he found his home. He spent his childhood in a neighborhood in the south of London, where he was first introduced to football.

Together with his brother, Guillermo, they competed in some cycling tests in London using the alias “Green”, which was an anglicization of their German surname. In the Catalan press of his time, he was often mentioned as Gustavo H. Green y Córdoba.

== Playing career ==
=== Escocés FC ===
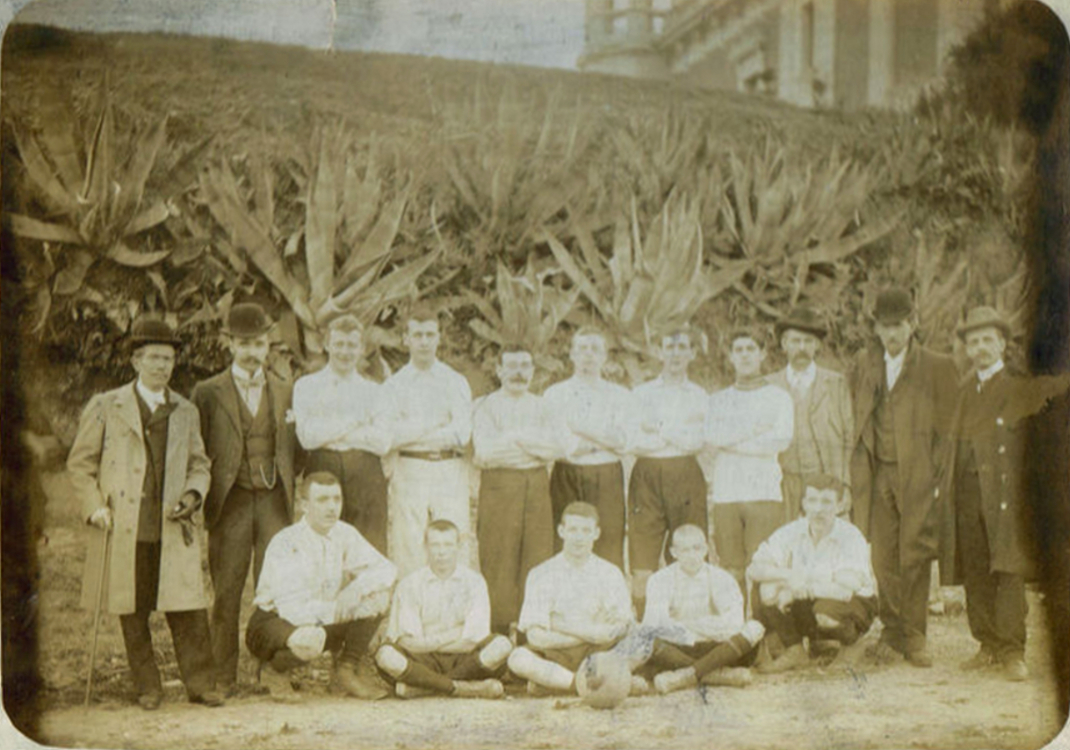
Players and managers of Escocès FC in a snapshot taken around March 1900. Gustavo is standing fourth to the right, with a scarf.

At the age of 20, Green returned to Spain and settled in Catalonia at the end of the 19th century, where he first joined Escocès FC, (Note: Green, standing fourth to the right, next to Edward Birkhead Steegmann, one of the English industrialists established at the La Escocesa factory.) a team made up of Scottish workers from a factory in Sant Andreu, such as George Girvan, Joseph Black and John Hamilton, the latter being the team's captain and goalkeeper.

Around March 1900, within only a month of his arrival, Escocés was immersed in a three-way controversy with FC Barcelona and Català FC, due to Green and Black (among others) playing a few friendly matches with both Escocès and Català in a very short space of time, causing Barcelona to launch complaints in their direction as they were unhappy about Escocès stars turning out for their city rivals at the time. The local press evan began mocking these Scottish players by calling them 'taxi-footballers'.

=== Català FC ===
While Black stayed with Escocés, Green decided to leave them as he probably felt like an outsider (he is the team's only documented non-Scottish member), and joined Català FC around April, but a conflict between the club members caused some of them to leave and found a new club in May, Team Roig, which went on to become Hispania Athletic Club in October 1900.

=== Hispania AC ===
Green played in Roig's official debut on 24 May, in a sports festival organized by the Polo Club, playing against FC Barcelona in a 2–1 loss, courtesy of a winner from Joan Gamper. At the beginning of October 1900, the players of Team Roig decided to legally establish themselves as a company, under the name of Hispania Athletic Club, with Green becoming the first captain of this team and also the leader of the club's football section. Shortly after, in November, Hispania took advantage of the dissolution of Escocés FC to incorporate several of its most prominent players, and Green might have played a pivotal role in Hispania's successful recruitment of Hamilton, Black and Willie Gold.

After the founding of the club, Hispania AC organized the first edition of the Copa Macaya in 1901, which was the first football championship played on the Iberian Peninsula, and the forerunner for the Catalan championship which began in 1903. In the opening match of the tournament against FC Barcelona on 20 January 1900, Green scored twice in a 2–1 comeback win, thus contributing decisively to help Hispania become the first-ever team to win a competitive match in Spanish football as well as the first team to defeat Barça in a competitive match. This result proved to be decisive in the outcome of the tournament since Hispania won the title over Barça by just two points. Green was Hispania's captain and best player at the tournament, playing a pivotal role in helping his side become the very first Spanish club to win an official title. He finished the tournament with 9 goals, 7 of which came in 0–10 and 14–0 trashings of Franco-Española. Those nine goals saw him finish as the second highest top scorer of the tournament only behind Joan Gamper who netted a whopping 31 goals.

=== FC Barcelona ===
Despite his goalscorer prowess, differences with the managers of Hispania about the position in which Green should line up led to his departure and subsequent entry into FC Barcelona, where together with Gamper, Arthur Witty and Udo Steinberg, he helped Barça win the 1901–02 Copa Macaya, the club's first-ever piece of silverware. Despite his status as a footballing star in Catalonia, Green only played four matches with Barça, all of which being competitive fixtures at the Copa Macaya, including a 1–0 victory over his former club Hispania on 9 March 1902. He was an unused substitute in the Barça squad that participated in the very first national tournament played in Spain, the 1902 Copa de la Coronación. Due to this lack of playing time with the first-team, Green decided to leave the club even before the end of the season, joining Club Español in 1901–02 and making his debut in a friendly match against Irish FC, but without playing an official match that season.

=== Club Español ===
Green spent most of his career with Club Español. In his first full season at the club, Green was decisive for Espanyol to win the third and last Copa Macaya, the club's first-ever piece of silverware, being the top scorer of the tournament with 7 goals including a brace in the decisive match against Hispania (3–1) on 12 April 1903. He thus won all the editions of this Cup each time with a different team, being the only player to have done so.

From 1903–04 onwards, the Catalan championship began to be organized by the Catalan Football Federation and the Copa Macaya became known as the Campionat de Catalunya, and together with Emilio Sampere, Ángel Rodríguez, and Ángel Ponz, Green helped the club sweep the title with 15 wins in 16 games and only giving up one draw at Barcelona's home, thus winning the Catalan championship for the fourth time in a row. He remained loyal to the club until 1905, when Español had to suspend its activities due to a lack of players since most of them were university students who enrolled to study at universities outside Catalonia in the 1905–06 academic year. Even though most of the remaining players joined X Sporting Club, such as Sampere, Ponz, and goalkeeper Pedro Gibert, Green decided to follow a different path, returning to Barcelona in 1906, and even playing a few unofficial matches with FC Barcelona in that same year.

In 1909, following a 3-year hiatus, Espanyol was finally and effectively relaunched as the Club Deportivo Español, the name which still stands today, so Green then played with Espanyol for four more years, being a member of the great Espanyol side of the 1910s that had the likes of Paco Bru, Sampere, and the Armet brothers (Francisco and Kinké), winning the Campionat de Catalunya for the second time in 1911–12. In the 1910–11 season, he almost did not play as he only participated punctually in a couple of charity matches, retiring from football at the end of the 1911–12 season. Green was ahead of his time, a star in the pioneering times of sport and a gifted ball player capable of winning titles in all the clubs he played for. Green was by far the most outstanding player of Espanyol's first decade of existence, being thus named into the club's team of the 1900s.

=== International career ===
In 1903, Green played two friendly matches between teams made up of the best players in Barcelona, the first at Muntaner on 21 May, scoring the White's only goal in a 1–3 loss to the Reds, and the second on 24 September, a test match between two "Barcelona teams" that was meant to decide who would integrate the first selection of the Catalan national team the following year.

On 15 January 1905, Green made his debut for Catalonia against the Sportsmen's Club at Espanyol's field, the Hospital Clínic, featuring in the attack alongside teammates Sampere and Ponz as the match finished with an unknown score. On 13 May 1906, he and fellow Espanyol teammates Carril and Ponz abandoned their occupations and made a sacrifice to cover the last minute losses of Catalonia (initially, it was supposed to be the famous champion of Swiss origin Morret) in a match against Madrid FC at the Barça field, helping his side to a 5–2 win.

On 18 November 1909, Green earned another cap for the Catalan national team in a match against Equip Blanc (White Team) at the Camp de la Indústria, on the occasion of a benefit match for the injured people in the Second Melillan campaign, starting in a 2–6 loss.

== Football executive ==
Even after retiring, Green remained closely linked to Espanyol, since he carried out functions as an accountant on its board of directors chaired by Santiago de la Riva. He also served as director of RCD Espanyol in several boards.

In 1904, in the absence of the technical director, Green and his teammate Ángel Ponz were in charge of directing the training sessions, so he can also be considered one of the first coaches of Espanyol.

== Professional life ==
Living exclusively out of football was not common at the time, and therefore, he had a second job, with his profession being that of a telegraph operator. In fact, when competing in cycling, he would also use the alias "Télégraphe".

== Personal life and death ==
Green married María Anglada Ribas in 1907 in Barcelona.

Green died on 9 November 1965 in Bilbao at the age of 65.

== Honours ==
=== Club ===
Hispania AC

  - Champions: 1900–01

FC Barcelona

- Copa Macaya:
  - Champions: 1901–02

-

Club Español

- Copa Macaya:
  - Champions: 1902–03
- Catalan championship
  - Champions: 1903–04 and 1911–12

=== Individual ===
Top goalscorer of the 1902–03 Copa Macaya with 7 goals.
