= Joseph Black (footballer) =

Scottish footballer

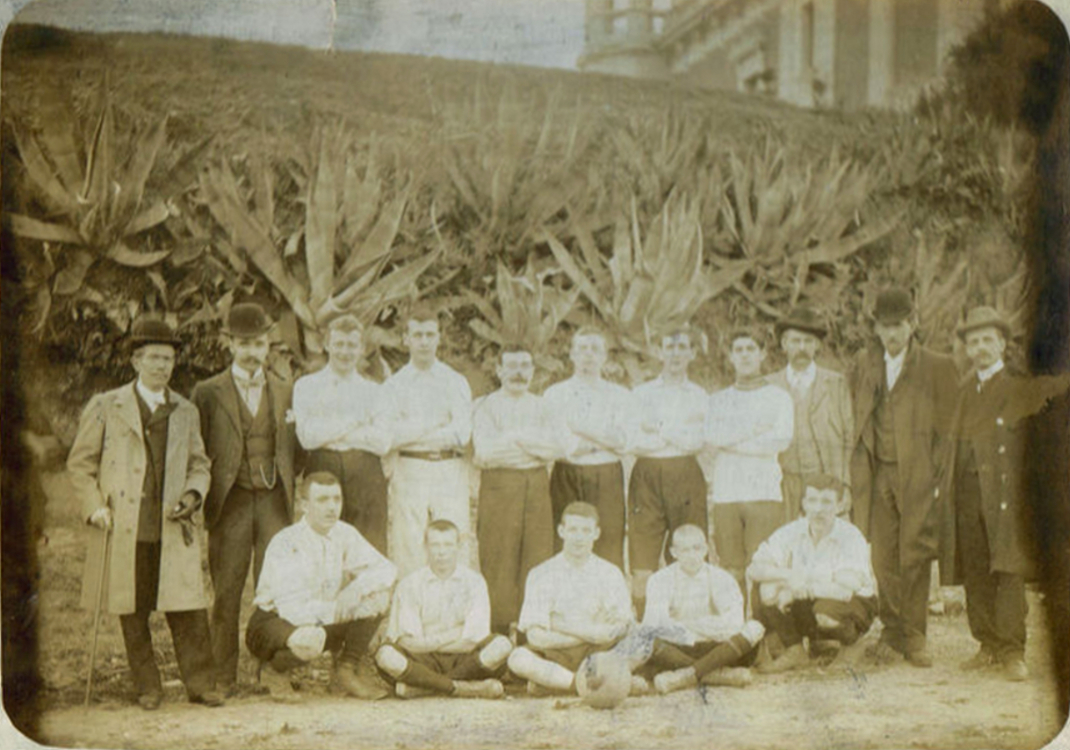
- Players and managers of Escocès FC in a snapshot taken around March 1900. Black is sitting second to the left, next to his brother.

Personal information
- Place of birth: Scotland
- Position: Forward

Senior career*
Years	Team	Apps	(Gls)
1900	Escocès FC		
1900–1903	Hispania AC	24	(11)
1904–1905	FC Barcelona	2	(3)
- * Club domestic league appearances and goals

Joseph Black was a Scottish footballer who played as a forward for Spanish club FC Barcelona. The dates of his birth and death are unknown. He and his brother, Alexander, were part of the infamous group of Scottish workers that formed Escocès FC at the start of 1900, and he was also one of the first Scottish players to ever play for Barcelona.

== Biography ==
Joseph Black was one of many young workers at lace manufacturers Johnston, Shields & Co in Newmilns sent over to work in the company's newly opened factory at Sant Martí de Provençals, known in Catalonia as La Escocesa, which started production back in 1893. At the start of 1900, whilst out in the Catalan capital, Mauchan and his fellow co-workers set up a football team to pass the time, calling it Escocès FC. In addition to Black, this team also had his brother and the likes of Peter Mauchan, George Girvan and team captain John Hamilton, with all of them, including him, going on to become the first Scottish players to wear the FC Barcelona colours. The team had a very short life and was broken up in November of the same year, and Hispania AC took advantage of its dissolution to incorporate several of its most prominent players, such as Hamilton, Gold and Black, while Mauchan, Girvan and his brother joined FC Barcelona.

Two months later, Hispania AC organized the first edition of the Copa Macaya in 1901, which was the first football championship played on the Iberian Peninsula, and the forerunner for the Catalan championship which began in 1903. At the tournament, Black formed an attacking partnership with Hamilton and captain Gustavo Green, netting 5 goals in total, and although all of which came against Franco-Española - two in a 10–0 away win and a hat-trick in a 14–0 home victory - he still played an important role in helping Hispania become the very first Spanish club to win an official title. Those five goals meant he finished level with his brother, who also netted five goals for Barça. The title was only decided on the last matchday with a game between Hispania and Barça in which the two brothers had to face off for historical immortality.

He remained loyal to the club until 19 November 1903, the day on which the entity's board agreed to its dissolution due to a lack of players. Most of the remaining players, including Hamilton and Black, joined FC Barcelona, thus becoming one of the first Scottish players to wear the Barça shirt. Black was a member of the Barça side that won the 1904–05 Catalan championship, featuring alongside the likes of Arthur Witty and Carles Comamala.

== Honours ==
Hispania AC

- Copa Macaya:
  - Champions: 1900–01

FC Barcelona

- Catalan championship:
  - Champions: 1904–05
