= Alexander Black (footballer) =

Scottish footballer

Alenxader Black
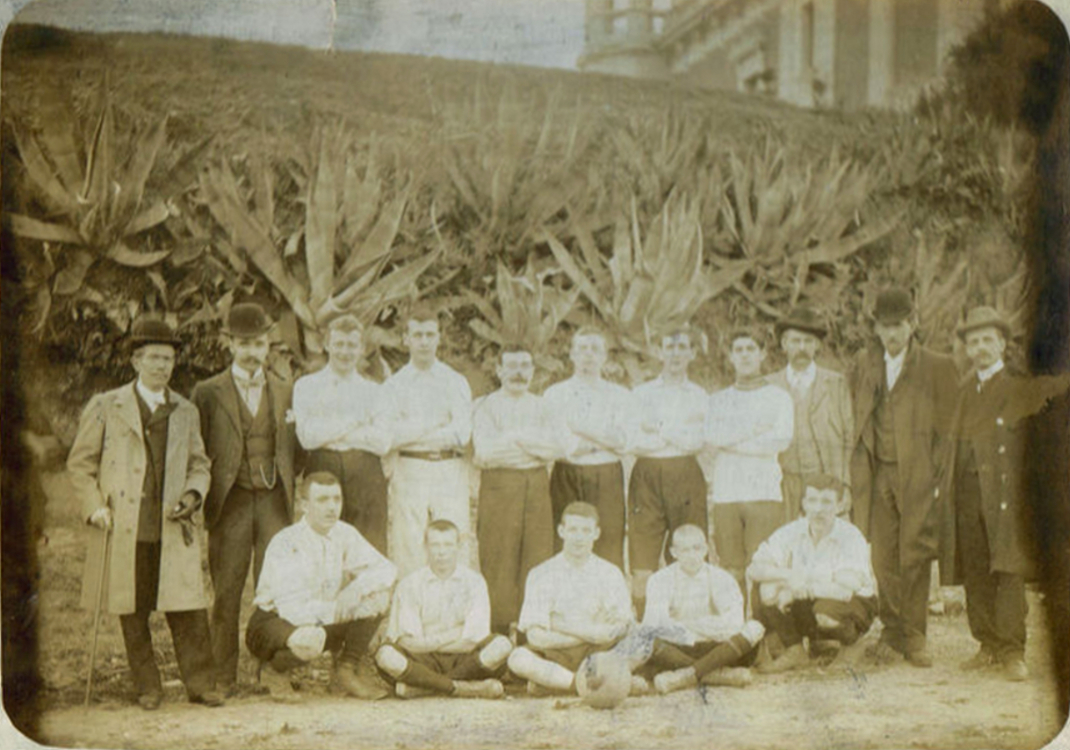
- Players and managers of Escocès FC in a snapshot taken around March 1900. Alexander among them.

Personal information
- Full name: Alexander Black
- Place of birth: Scotland
- Position: Forward

Senior career*
Years	Team	Apps	(Gls)
1900	Escocès FC		
1900–1901	FC Barcelona	6	(6)
- * Club domestic league appearances and goals

Alexander Black was a Scottish footballer who played as a forward for Spanish club FC Barcelona. The dates of his birth and death are unknown. He and his brother, Joseph, were part of the infamous group of Scottish workers that formed Escocès FC, and he was also one of the first Scottish players to wear the Barcelona shirt.

== Biography ==
The Black brothers were two of many young workers at lace manufacturers Johnston, Shields & Co in Newmilns sent over to work in the company's newly opened factory at Sant Martí de Provençals, known in Catalonia as La Escocesa, which started production back in 1893. At the start of 1900, he and his brother, together with their co-workers, set up a football team to pass the time, calling it Escocès FC. In addition to him and his brother, this team also had the likes of Peter Mauchan, George Girvan and team captain John Hamilton, with all of them, including him, went on to play for FC Barcelona. The team had a very short life and was broken up in November of the same year, and Barcelona took advantage of its dissolution to incorporate several of its most prominent players, such as Black, Mauchan and Girvan, who thus became the first-ever Scottish players to wear the Barça shirt, while his brother Joseph was recruited by Hispania AC, before joining Barça a few years later.

In his only season at the club, he played nine games and scored six goals, with five of them coming during the inaugural edition of the Copa Macaya in 1901, netting a hat-trick in a 18–0 away trashing of Club Tarragona and two goals in a 14–0 home victory over Franco-Española, but despite his goalscoring prowess, Barça finished runner-up to Hispania AC. Those five goals meant he finished level with his brother, who also netted five goals for Hispania. The title was only decided on the last matchday with a game between Hispania and Barça in which the two brothers had to play against each other for historical immortality. He retired shortly after losing this match.
