= George Girvan =

Spanish footballer (1878–1968)

Personal information
- Date of birth: 13 June 1878
- Place of birth: Motherwell, Scotland
- Date of death: 3 July 1968 (aged 90)
- Place of death: Newmilns, Scotland
- Position: Forward

Senior career*
Years	Team	Apps	(Gls)
1900	Escocès FC	+6	
1900–1901	FC Barcelona	8	(8)
1901–1903	Hispania AC		
- * Club domestic league appearances and goals

George Girvan (13 June 1878 – 3 July 1968), was a Scottish footballer who played as a forward for Spanish club FC Barcelona. He is best known for scoring the very first competitive goal in Barcelona's history at the 1900–01 Copa Macaya.

== Escocès FC ==
George Girvan was born in Motherwell on 13 June 1878. He was one of many young Scottish workers at lace manufacturers Johnston, Shields & Co in Newmilns sent over to work in the company's newly opened factory at Sant Martí de Provençals, known in Catalonia as La Escocesa, which started production back in 1893. At the start of 1900, whilst out in the Catalan capital, the 20-year-old George and his co-workers set up a football team to pass the time, calling it Escocès FC. In addition to Girvan, this team also had the likes of Peter Mauchan, the Black brothers (Alexander and Joseph) and team captain John Hamilton, and all of them, including him, went on to play for FC Barcelona. In November 1900, Escocés FC folded and Barcelona took advantage of its dissolution to incorporate several of its most prominent players, such as Girvan, A. Black, and Mauchan, thus becoming the first-ever Scottish players to wear the Barça shirt. On the other hand, J. Hamilton, J. Black and Gold were recruited by Hispania AC.

== FC Barcelona ==
Two months later, Hispania AC organized the first edition of the Copa Macaya in 1901, which was the first football championship played on the Iberian Peninsula, and the forerunner for the Catalan championship which began in 1903. (Note: According to the press, Barcelona enrolls N. Girvan in the first edition of the Copa Macaya. This initial does not match his name. It is worth saying that the same media wrote another Barça player as N. Mauchan, when this one was called Peter Mauchan.) The first match of the tournament saw Barcelona take on Hispania AC on 20 January 1901, held at Barca's second ever home ground, the Campo del Hotel Casanovas on Gran Via, and at some point during the game Girvan scored the opening goal, thus assuring a place in the footballing history books as the author of the very first competitive goal in Barcelona history, although Barça went on to lose 1–2 and eventually lost the title to Hispania. At the tournament, Girvan formed an attacking partnership with John Parsons and captain Joan Gamper, netting a second goal against Franco-Española for a total of two goals. During his time with Barcelona, Girvan became well known for his adaptability, owing to his superior knowledge of the game compared to the locals. He played eight games for Barcelona in total and scored the same number of goals, thus achieving a ratio of one goal per game.

Girvan left Barça in 1901 to join their city rivals Hispania AC, thus reuniting with his fellow countrymen Hamilton, Gold and J. Black, a decision he might have regretted as Barça then won the second edition of the Copa Macaya. With time, Girvan's economic and social situation improved, and as a result, he returned to his native Scotland, specifically to Newmilns, where he would go on to become the city's mayor. Girvan would fondly reminisce about the innocence and naivety he had in the early days of football in Barcelona.

== Later life ==
In 1957, Geordie was in Hampden Park to watch a game between Scotland and Spain, ending in a 4–2 win for the Scots, and at the end of the game the former Barcelona man said: "I suppose I taught these guys how to play, and how to commit fouls!". Girvan died on 3 July 1968 at the age of 90.
