= Arthur Witty =

Footballer, club president and businessman

Personal information
- Full name: Arthur Witty
- Date of birth: 1878
- Place of birth: Barcelona, Spain
- Date of death: 1969 (aged 90–91)

Senior career*
| Years | Team | Apps | (Gls) |
| 1899–1905 | FC Barcelona | 41 | (5) |
- * Club domestic league appearances and goals

Arthur Witty Cotton, also known as Don Arturo, was a footballer, club president and businessman. Witty played for FC Barcelona in the first Copa del Rey final and later served as club president between 1903 and 1905. He was also a successful trader and his family company, the Witty Group, continues to operate today. He was the older brother of Ernest Witty.

== Biography ==
=== Early years ===
Witty was the son of Frederick Witty, a British entrepreneur, who settled in Barcelona. Frederick, who belonged to a Yorkshire family, initially intended to emigrate to Argentina but was persuaded to go to Spain by friends. In 1873 he founded his own shipping agency under the name of F. Witty, subsequently establishing business links between Spain and the United Kingdom. Arthur and his brother, Ernest, were educated at Merchant Taylors' School in Merseyside, where sport was regarded as a major part of a young man's development. While at Merchant Taylors, Arthur played as a forward for the local rugby union team, Waterloo FC. On their return to Barcelona the two brothers joined their father's company which now became known as Witty Sociedad Anónima, Witty S.A.

=== FC Barcelona footballer ===
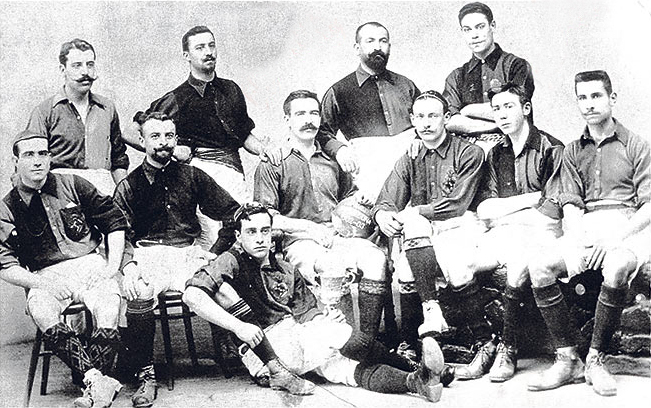
Witty (seated, middle with a ball) in 1903

Arthur and Ernest returned to Spain with a love of sports. Unable to play rugby union due to a lack of suitable pitches, the Wittys began to organise football games between company teams made up of employees. In 1899 Ernest also became a founding member of the Real Club de Tenis Barcelona. Ernest, a Spanish national tennis champion, played tennis with, among others, Joan Gamper and when Gamper founded FC Barcelona in October 1899, the Witty brothers quickly became involved. They used their company to imports regulation balls, referees whistles and nets from England. Legend also has it that the Witty brothers also imported the legendary club colours, the blaugrana, from the original colours used by Merchant Taylors' rugby team. However FC Basel and other clubs that Gamper played for and his home canton of Zurich and have all been credited and/or claimed to be the inspiration. Either way, Old Merchant Taylors' BaaBarians hockey team carry FC Barcelona shirts as their away strip in tribute to Arthur Witty.

In early December 1899 the club played its first official game against an English Select at the Velódrom de la Bonanova, now known as Turó Parc. The teams only had ten men each and the English Select actually included several FC Barcelona players, among them, Arthur Witty. The English Select won the game 1–0 with Witty scoring the only goal. On Christmas Eve 1899 Witty made his official debut for the club in a 3–1 win over Català SC.

FC Barcelona was one of several football clubs formed in the city around this time and soon there was enough teams to organise a regular competition, the Copa Macaya. Witty was a member of the FC Barcelona team which won its first ever trophy, the Copa Macaya in 1902. He also played for FC Barcelona in 1902 when they were invited to enter the first ever Copa del Rey. After beating Madrid FC, later to become Real Madrid, 3–1 in the first round, they lost 2–1 to Club Vizcaya in the final. Witty also helped the club win the Copa Barcelona in 1903. Between 1899 and 1905 Witty played 74 games, mainly as a full-back for FC Barcelona.

=== FC Barcelona President ===
Witty became president of FC Barcelona on 17 September 1903 after having previously served on the board of directors. During his presidency the club won its first Championat de Catalunya with a squad that included Ernest Witty and Romà Forns. The latter was one of several young reserve players Witty introduced into the team. By now FC Barcelona had acquired a strong fan base within the city and Witty arranged for the club to play their home games at the Carrer Muntaner. Witty also organised the club's first trip abroad which resulted in their first game against a non-Spanish team. On 1 May 1904 FC Barcelona beat Stade Olympien des Étudiants Toulousains 3–2. The same opponents were then invited back to FC Barcelona to play the inaugural game at the Carrer Muntaner. FC Barcelona won this game 4–0 with two goals from Joan Gamper. Witty stepped down as president on 6 October 1905.

=== After Barcelona ===
In June 1924 Witty briefly became involved in controversy when he invited the British Royal Marine band that played God Save the Queen at [[Camp de Les Corts|Les Corts]], after their attempts to play the Spanish national anthem were jeered. As a result, Witty became disillusioned at the politicization of FC Barcelona club and, while remaining a fan, he gradually began to distance himself from the club. During the 1930s Witty and his son, Frederick Jr., established the family company as traders and helped introduce well known names such as Cadburys, Johnnie Walker, Unilever and Bovril into the Spanish market. Witty also served as President of the Barcelona Ship Agents Association until 1936 and was a leader in the Barcelona and Spanish shipping communities. During the Spanish Civil War the company was exempted from a takeover by a workers committee as it was technically a British-owned company and it continued to trade successfully. During the Second World War, Witty left Spain, leaving the business in hands of a lawyer. He returned during the Franco years and regained his status as a leading shipping agent. Together with his brother he also opened a successful sports shop.

== Honours ==
- Copa de la Coronación
  - Runner-up 1902
- Copa Macaya: 1
  - 1901–02
- Copa Barcelona: 1
  - 1902–03
- Campionat de Catalunya: 1
  - 1904–05

== Sources ==
- Morbo: The Story of Spanish Football (2003), Phil Ball.
- Barça: A People's Passion (1998), Jimmy Burns.
