= Sant Martí de Provençals =

Coordinates: 41°25′2″N 2°11′53″E

- Neighborhood of Barcelona
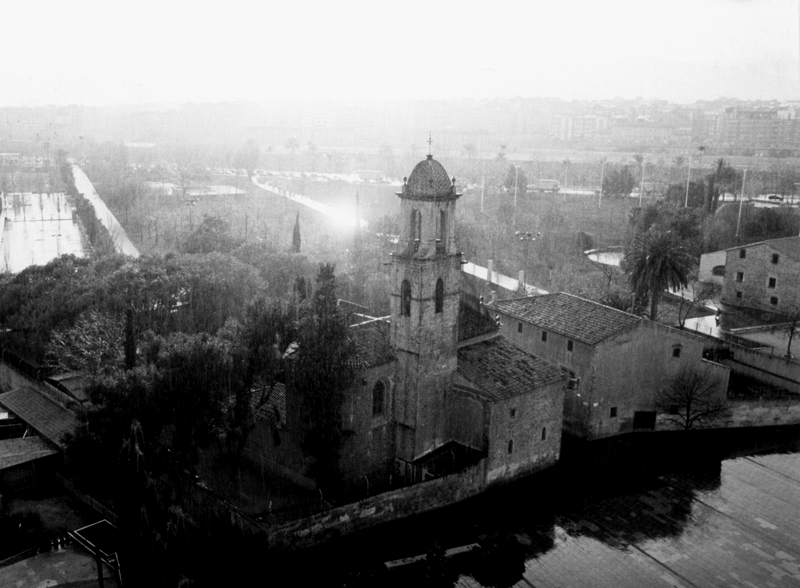
- Church of Sant Martí
- Interactive map of Sant Martí de Provençals
- Country: Spain
- Autonomous Community: Catalonia
- Province: Barcelona
- Comarca: Barcelonès
- Municipality: Barcelona
- District: Sant Martí

Area
  - Total: 0.745 km^{2} (0.288 sq mi)

Population
  - Total: 26,169
  - Density: 35,100/km^{2} (91,000/sq mi)
- Demonym(s): provençalenc, -a

Sant Martí de Provençals (Catalan pronunciation: [ˌsam məɾˈti ðə pɾuβənˈsals]) is a neighborhood in the Sant Martí district of Barcelona, Catalonia (Spain).

Sant Martí de Provençals was the center of the eponymous former municipality, which now more or less coincides with the current district of Sant Martí and which gave its name to the main core of the town. Until the 1950s the area was occupied by fields, country houses and the church of Sant Martí. The population of the district later increased due to the arrival of migratory waves.
