= 1899–1900 FC Barcelona season =

1st season in existence of Fútbol Club Barcelona

FC Barcelona
1899-1900 season
- President: Walter Wild
- Manager: No manager
- Top goalscorer: League: No league All: Joan Gamper (8 goals)
Home colours	Away colours

The 1899–1900 season was the first season for FC Barcelona. During this season, the club only played friendly matches against local clubs.

== Events ==
On 22 October 1899, a sports weekly printed in Barcelona, Los Deportes, published an advert in which Hans Gamper, a 21-year-old German-speaking Swiss, called for football fans.

Football Club Barcelona was created on 29 November of the same year, after a meeting held at Gimnasio Solé, a gym located at number 5 Montjuïc del Carme Street, in Barcelona's El Raval. Walter Wild, Luis de Ossó, Bartomeu Terradas, Otto Künzli, Otto Maier, Enric Ducay, Pere Cabot, Carles Puyol, Josep Llobet, John Parsons, William Parsons, and Joan Gamper signed the record.

On 8 December, Barcelona played their first match, at the former Velódromo de la Bonanova, against some Englishmen who had settled in the city. Both teams played with 10-men squads. The English Colony won 0–1 thanks to a goal from Arthur Witty.

The first board of directors was established on 14 December. Walter Wild was elected chairman since he was the oldest of the members. Terrades was appointed treasurer, Ossó as secretary, Gamper as the team's first-ever captain, and the Parsons brothers as vice-president and vice-captain respectively. Dark blue and garnet were the chosen colours for the uniform, the same colours of Gamper's former Swiss team, FC Basel. The badge was to be the same as the coat of arms of the city. The membership fee was set at two pesetas.

On 11 February, the Englishman Stanley Harris becomes the first player in the history of the club to be sent off in the match played against Català FC, which was using 6 members of Escocès FC. In addition to Harris, Willie Gold, the Scottish player who had received the foul, returned with a punch and was also sent off. The incident caused a fight between players of both teams and as a result, Joan Gamper, Barça's captain in this match, resigned from the position.

On 14 February, Barcelona's third assembly completed the board of directors with Ernest Witty (sub-captain) (replacing William Parsons) and Joan Millet (sub-secretary). In this meeting, Gamper is urged to withdraw his resignation, not considering the incidents of the previous match sufficient. Barcelona refused to play any team with Scottish players in their ranks for a year if an apology was not received, but both Català and Escocès refused to do so, stating that those Scots are members of Català, and therefore, the rest of the 1899–1900 Catalan season was just confrontations between Escocès and Català. Following a 3-month hiatus without playing (Feb - May), Barcelona finally played again on 24 May against Team Rojo, a team formed by a group of dissident players of Català, their established city rivals.

== Squad ==
Source: Note: Flags indicate national team as defined under FIFA eligibility rules; some limited exceptions apply. Players may hold more than one non-FIFA nationality.

No.	Pos.	Nation	Player
—	GK	(Catalonia) CAT	Juan de Urruela (First club)
—	GK	(England) ENG	A. J. Smart (First club)
—	DF	(Switzerland) SUI	Walter Wild (First club)
—	DF	(England) ENG	Henry W. Brown (Team Anglès)
—	DF	(England) ENG	A. Fitzmaurice (Team Anglès)
—	MF	(Catalonia) CAT	Bartomeu Terradas (FC Mulhouse)
—	MF	(Catalonia) CAT	Luis de Ossó (First club)
—	MF	(England) ENG	Arthur Witty (Team Anglès)
—	MF	(Catalonia) CAT	Josep Llobet (First club)
—	FW	(Catalonia) CAT	Pere Cabot (First club)
—	FW	(Catalonia) CAT	Adolfo López (First club)

No.	Pos.	Nation	Player
—	FW	(Germany) GER	Otto Maier (FC Britannia)
—	FW	(Switzerland) SUI	Otto Künzli (First club)
—	FW	(Germany) GER	Eduardo Schilling (First club)
—	FW	(England) ENG	Gordon Bastow (Team Anglès)
—	FW	(Catalonia) CAT	Francisco Cruzate (First club)
—	FW	(Catalonia) CAT	Ernest Witty (Team Anglès)
—	FW	(Catalonia) CAT	Miguel Valdés (Català FC)
—	FW	(England) ENG	Stanley Harris (Team Anglès)
—	FW	(Catalonia) CAT	William Parsons (Team Anglès)
—	FW	(Catalonia) CAT	John Parsons (Team Anglès)
—	FW	(Switzerland) SUI	Hans Gamper (FC Lyon)
—	FW	(England) ENG	James Gillespie (First club)

Losses 1899–1900	Destination
(Switzerland) Otto Künzli	Retired
(Germany) Eduardo Schilling	Retired
(Guatemala) Juan de Urruela	Retired
(Catalonia) William Parsons	Work reasons
(England) Henry W. Brown	Català FC

== Results ==
=== Friendly matches ===
8 December 1899	FC Barcelona	0 – 1	Team Anglès	Barcelona
15:00	Urruela; Wild, J. Lomba; Terradas, Ossó, Llobet; Künzli, Gamper, López, Schilling	La Vanguardia	A. Witty Raintree; Wamaurice; Webb, A. Witty, Morrison; W. Parsons, J. Parsons, E. Witty, Harris	Stadium: Velódromo de la Bonanova; Referee: Arthur Leask

24 December 1899	FC Barcelona	3 – 1	Català FC	Barcelona
15:00	Gamper; E. Witty Urruela; Wild, Brown; Terradas, Ossó, Llobet; E. Witty, A. Witty, Gamper, J. Parsons, Cruzate	webdelcule La Vanguardia	Paniagua; Ortiz, Mir; J.A. Busquets, V.J. González, Joan García; G. Busquets, Valdés, Artús, L. Valls, F. Valls	Stadium: Velódromo de la Bonanova; Attendance: 100; Referee: Arthur Leask; Assistant referees: Adolfo López; Fermín Lomba

26 December 1899	FC Barcelona + Català FC	2 – 1	Team Anglès	Barcelona
15:00	Gamper Urruela; Wild, F. Lomba; Valdés, Ossó, Llobet; Mir, Artús, Gamper, Planells, Soley	webdelcule La Vanguardia	J. Parsons; F. Ball, Brown; Morrison, Fitzmaurice, J. Ball; E. Witty, A. Witty, W. Parsons, J.A. Ball, Bastow	Stadium: Velódromo de la Bonanova; Referee: (1ª half) Jaime Vila

6 January 1900 Combined	FC Barcelona + Català FC	0 – 3	Team Anglès	Barcelona
15:00; Borrowed from Escocès FC [1] Last match for Barcelona [2]	Urruela; Wild, F. Lomba; Terradas, Ossó, Llobet; G. Busquets, J.A. Busquets, Gamper, Soley	webdelcule (1); Los Deportes (2); La Vanguardia	Urruela o.g.' ? Hamilton^{1} Jim Dykes,^{1} Brown; H. Morris, A. Witty, Morrison; W. Parsons,^{2} J. Parsons, Fitzmaurice, E. Witty, Bastow	Stadium: Velódromo de la Bonanova; Referee: (1ª half) J. Candwell (2ª half) Alberto Serra

28 January 1900 Training	FC Barcelona	6 – 0	Català FC	Barcelona
15:00; Borrowed from Escocès FC [1]	A. J. Smart; Wild, Brown; Terradas, Ossó, Llobet; E. Witty, Maier, Gamper, J. Parsons, Bastow	Los Deportes; La Vanguardia	J. Lomba; Vila, J. Soler; Joan García, G. Ríos, Garcés; Mir, Soley, Wishart,^{1} Valdés, F. Lomba	Stadium: Velódromo de la Bonanova

2 February 1900	FC Barcelona	2 – 0	Escocès FC	Barcelona
15:00	Gamper Smart; Wild, Fitzmaurice; Terradas, A. Witty, Llobet; Gillespie, Maier, Gamper, E. Witty, Bastow	webdelcule La Vanguardia	Hamilton; Wallace, Fallon; Denniston, Wishart, Dykes; A. Black, Gold, J. Black, Mauchan, Girvan	Stadium: Velódromo de la Bonanova; Referee: J. Candwell; Assistant referees: Luis de Ossó; William Mauchan

11 February 1900	FC Barcelona	4 – 0	Català FC + Escocès FC	Barcelona
15:00; Sent off [1]	E. Witty; Gamper Smart; Wild, Fitzmaurice; Terradas, A. Witty, Llobet; Gillespie, Parsons, Gamper, E. Witty, Harris ^{1}	webdelcule La Vanguardia; Mundo Deportivo	Hamilton; Lomba, Brown; Denniston, Soley, Dykes; A. Black, Mir, Gold ^{1}, Girvan, G. Busquets	Stadium: Velódromo de la Bonanova; Referee: William Mauchan; Assistant referees: Gordon Bastow; Manuel Planells

24 May 1900	Team Roig	1 – 2	FC Barcelona	Barcelona
16:30	Planells; Ortiz, J. Soler; J.A. Busquets, Soley, Joan García; L. Valls, Julià García, Green, Sanmartín, F. Lomba	webdelcule La Vanguardia	López; Gamper Smart; Wild, Gillespie; Terradas, Ossó, Llobet; Valdés, Maier, Gamper, López, Cabot	Stadium: Hipòdromo de Barcelona; Referee: (1ª half) John Parsons (2ª half) Alberto Serra; Assistant referees: Jaume Torres
