= José Lomba =

Spanish professor, researcher, and critic (1868–1951)

- Born: José Ramón Macario Lomba de la Pedraja; 29 February 1868; Santander, Cantabria, Spain
- Died: 4 January 1951 (aged 82); Barcelona, Catalonia, Spain
- Citizenship: Spanish
- Occupations: Professor; Researcher; Critic; Footballer
- Known for: Playing in the first-ever match of FC Barcelona
Association football career
- Full name: José Lomba
- Positions: Goalkeeper; defender
Senior career*
Years	Team	Apps	(Gls)
1899	FC Barcelona	1	(0)
1899–1900	Catalá FC	+8	(0)
- * Club domestic league appearances and goals

José Ramón Macario Lomba de la Pedraja (29 February 1868 – 4 January 1951) was a Spanish professor, researcher, and critic. He is best known for his brief football career at the turn of the century, playing as a goalkeeper and defender for Catalá FC and FC Barcelona in 1899 and 1900, most notably in the latter's very first match.

Professionally, he was a professor at several universities, a writer, and a literary critic. He later became a professor of Spanish language and literature in Murcia and Oviedo. His younger brother Fermín played for Catalá FC, and his first cousin Fermín was a soldier and historian.

== Early life and education ==
José Lomba was born on 29 February 1868 in Santander, as the child of José Ramón Lomba de los Cuetos (1830–1891) and Amanda de la Pedraja Cuesta (1840–1928). He was the oldest of seven siblings, the others being Ignacio (1869–?), María Luisa (1870–1900), José Antonio (1873–1877), Fermín (1877–1946), Luis Felipe (1881–1971), and Clemente (1885–1968). He obtained a degree in Law and Letters as well as a doctorate in Letters from the Central University.

== Football career ==
=== FC Barcelona ===
Lomba moved to Barcelona in the late 19th century, to continue his studies. He began to practice football, a sport relatively unknown at the time, at the Velódromo de la Bonanova with some friends and his brother, Fermín. At some point in late 1899, the Lomba brothers joined the ranks of Català FC, which had just become the first football team formed in Catalonia in October. They might even have belonged to the group of football enthusiasts led by Jaime Vila that formed the club in a meeting held at the Gimnasio Tolosa, although this assumption remains unconfirmed. Català was soon followed by Joan Gamper's FC Barcelona, which proved to be a failure as it only brought together ten players for its debut against Team Anglès on 8 December 1899, including the 31-year-old José Lomba of Català, who thus played in Barça's very first match, which ended in a 0–1 loss.

In Barcelona's second-ever game, in which they faced Català on the Christmas Eve of 1899, Lomba served as a linesman under referee Arthur Leask as Barça scored three times in a 3–1 win, although one of them was protested by Lomba, based on the fact that Gamper had touched the ball with his hands before scoring.

On 26 December 1899, Català and Barcelona agreed to join the best players of each team to face Team Anglès, and in the absence of Barça's defender Henry W. Brown, who that day played for the English, Lomba took his position and formed a defensive partnership with the then Barcelona president Walter Wild. In this match, Lomba assisted Gamper's second goal with "a superb pass" to help his side to a 2–1 victory. This scenario was repeated on 6 January 1900, but this time they lost 0–3.

=== Català FC ===
On 28 January, Lomba finally made his debut for the "unmixed" Català FC side, playing as a goalkeeper alongside his brother Fermín, who played as a forward in an eventual 0–6 loss. On 11 February, Català once again combined forces with a neighboring team, this time Escocès FC, to play against FC Barcelona, and despite the inclusion of six players from Escocès, Lomba was once again on the starting eleven as a defender in a 0–4 loss. He then played a further five matches for Català, all as a goalkeeper and all against Escocès between February and April 1900; in the chronicles of these five matches, his name was wrongly written as either "A. Lomba" or "Lambea". One of them stated that "Mr. Lomba, who served as poster, was busy and fulfilling his difficult task wonderfully". While his brother Fermín went on to play many more matches with the likes of Hispania AC, José apparently retired around the summer of 1900, since he was not mentioned in a match chronicle ever again.

== Academic career ==
After a competitive examination, Lomba obtained the chair of Spanish Language and Literature at the University of Murcia in 1920, being its first holder. When he arrived in Murcia, he already had a notable critical work, having published studies about the likes of Juan Arolas in 1898 and José Carlos Somoza in 1904. In 1899, Lomba published El rey don Pedro en el Teatro in the Homage to Marcelino Menéndez y Pelayo, and in 1915, he published his doctoral thesis on Enrique Gil y Carrasco. He dedicated much of his research to Spanish Romanticism, especially to the work of Mariano José de Larra, publishing two works about him in 1918 and 1920, the first about Larra as a political writer and the second as a literary critic.

In 1922, Lomba published his edition of Don Quixote de la Mancha by Miguel de Cervantes, with a selection of texts for young students.

Upon obtaining a professorship of Literature at the University of Oviedo, Lomba moved there in 1923, thus replacing Pedro Sainz Rodríguez, who moved to Madrid in 1924 to the newly created chair of Bibliology. After his transfer, he continued his studies, especially in literary Castellan Classics, on whom he published a couple more works and editions. He explained historical grammar following the manual composed by Ramón Menéndez Pidal, and Spanish literature through the books of Menéndez Pelayo, plus his own research on romanticism writers, Larra in particular. In the University of Oviedo, Lomba gave the opening speech of the 1932–33 academic year about Spanish Costumbristas of the first half of the 19th century. In the university, he was mockingly called "Martin Pescador".

In 1936, Lomba published Mariano José de Larra (Fígaro). Four studies that approach or border on him, a book that collected all of his articles about Larra, such as his articles editions, his "Spanish Costumbristas" speech, and his "Romantic Theater".

On 1 April 1939, Lomba was appointed dean of the Philosophy and Letters Section of the University of Oviedo.

== Personal life ==
During his teaching years in Oviedo, Lomba lived at the "Covadonga" hotel. He liked to take long walks and kept a compass to know how many steps he had taken during the day. He also liked to sunbathe, wearing shorts. A servant went ahead, ringing a small bell and saying: "Mr. Lomba passes naked, Mr. Lomba passes naked," to warn the villagers.

== Death ==
Lomba died on 4 January 1951, at the age of 82 years.

== Works ==
- El P. Arolas su vida y sus versos. Estudio crítico (1898)
- El rey don Pedro en el Teatro (1899)
- Vida y Arte. Esbozo de Psicología literaria (1902)
- Obras en prosa y verso de D. José Somoza, con notas apéndices y un estudio preliminar (1904).
- Enrique Gil y Carrasco, su vida y su obra literaria (1915)
- Mariano José de Larra (Fígaro) como escritor político (1918)
- Mariano José de Larra (Fígaro), como crítico literario (1920)
- Artículos de costumbres de Mariano José de Larra (1923)
- Artículos de crítica literaria y artística (1923)
- Teatro anterior a Lope de Vega. Selección (1924)
- Teatro Romántico (1926)
- Venganza catalana y Juan Lorenzo de Antonio García Gutiérrez (1925)
- Artículos políticos y sociales (1927)
- Poesías de Padre Arolas (1928)
- Mariano José de Larra (Fígaro). Cuatro estudios que le abordan o le bordean (1936)
