= Eduardo Alesson =

Spanish football executive

1st President of the Catalan Football Federation
- In office 1900–1904
- Succeeded by: Josep de Togores

2nd President of Hispania AC
- In office 1902–1903
- Preceded by: José Ortiz
- Born: Eduard Alesson i Gravirona; Catalonia, Spain
- Died: 1951; Barcelona, Catalonia, Spain
- Citizenship: Spanish
- Occupations: Football executive; Fencing teacher
- Known for: 1st President of the Catalan Football Federation

Eduardo Alesson Gravirona was a Spanish football executive and fencing teacher. He was one of the most important figures in the amateur beginnings of football in Catalonia since he was the fundamental head behind the foundation of both Hispania AC and the Catalan Football Federation in 1900, and then serving both entities as their first-ever president. He also worked as a football referee.

== Sporting career ==
=== Fencing ===
Alesson was a man of great culture and very well regarded in the sporting environments of the late 19th and early 20th centuries in Barcelona, as he represented the prototype of the sportsman, a man who enjoyed all the sports and practiced most of the ones who were in fashion at that time, such as fencing and football. In 1893, he became a fencing teacher at the Gimnàs Mèdic de Barcelona (Medical Gymnasium in Barcelona), and between 1897 and 1898, he opened the armory that bore his name, where some of the best fencers were trained, such as Alfonso Ardura, a future president of the Catalan Fencing Federation and of RCD Espanyol, or Alfredo Conde. On 9 December 1898, Alesson participated in the first athletic race that took place in the city of Barcelona, organized by Jaime Vila, a teacher at the Tolosa Gymnasium.

=== Hispania AC ===
In October 1900, Alesson played a fundamental role in the foundation of Hispània Athletic Club, which was formed, among others, by a group of football players from Català FC, which included several of Català's founding members, such as Fermín Lomba, and Carlos Soley. Hispania AC, however, was not just a football club, but a Society that participated in other sports, such as athletics and tennis. Hispania's first president was José Ortiz, but the soul of the club was Alesson and the sports patron Alfonso Macaya, who were the honorary presidents of Hispania during its first years.

=== Catalan Football Federation and ===
At the turn of the century, several clubs were informally playing football matches in Catalonia, so on 11 November 1900, Alesson, together with representatives of eight clubs, founded the Asociación de Clubs de Football de Barcelona (AC de F.) in a room on Carrer Archs in Barcelona. This was the body that regulated the first rules of Catalan football, and that six years later became the Catalan Football Federation. He was elected as its first president, with his mandate lasting from the entity's foundation until November 1904, when he was replaced by Josep de Togores. In the following week, on 18 November, on the occasion of the inauguration of the first FC Barcelona field, next to the Casanovas hotel, the AC de F. published its first football regulation.

=== Copa Macaya ===
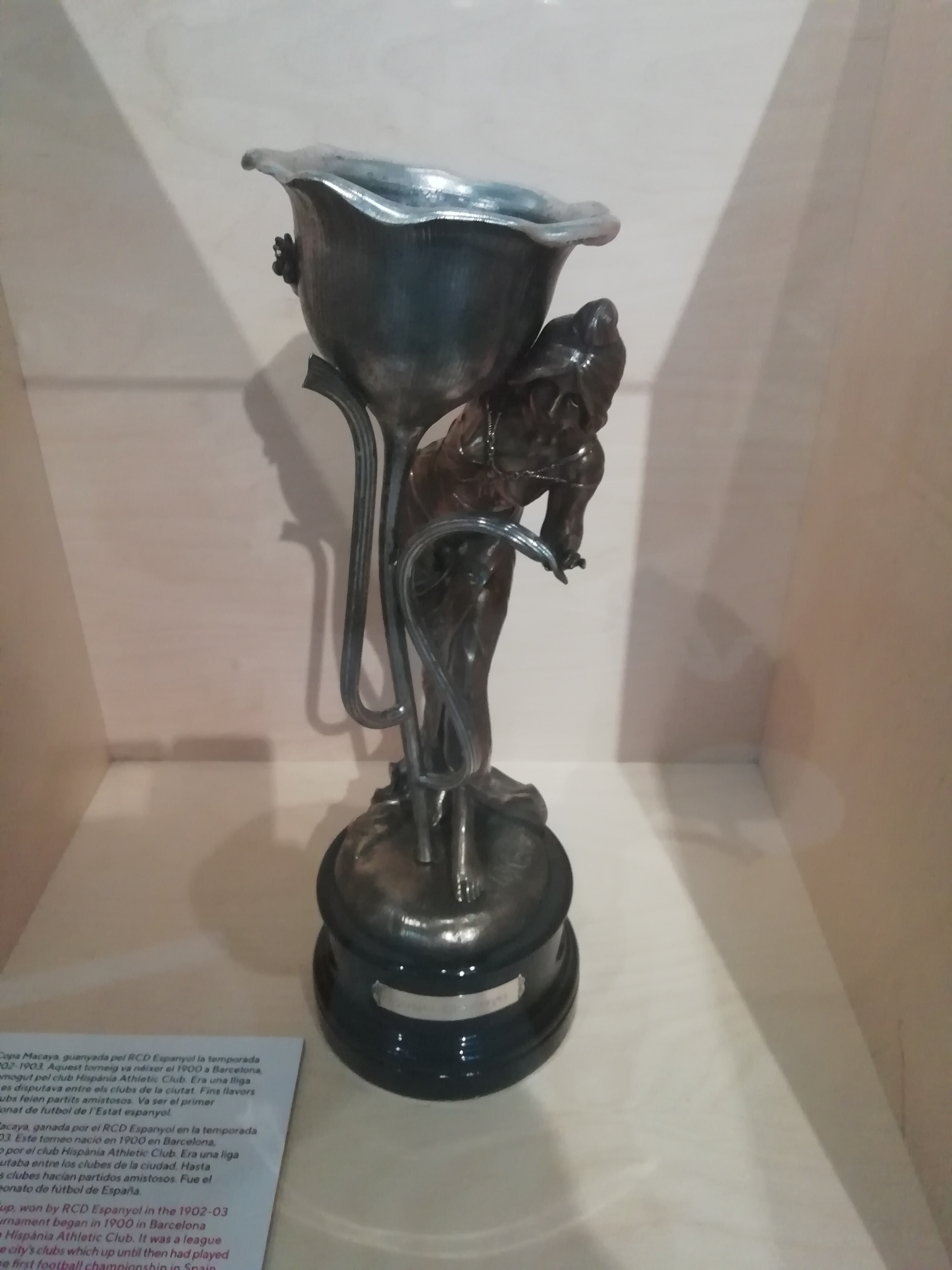
The Copa Macaya trophy.

It was under his presidency that the Copa Macaya was created, a football championship contested in a league format between the different clubs that had been created in Spain, which was hosted by Hispania AC, who won its first edition in 1901. On 24 March 1901, Alesson attended the match between Hispania AC and Tarragona, which was played on Hispania's field, the Camp del carrer Muntaner, and once the match was over, the Hispania players became the object of all kinds of entertainment from their visitors, with Alesson being one of the "many sporting elements of the capital" that was among the distinguished crowd that witnessed the party.

After being crowned the best Catalan team of the moment, Hispania started the 1901–02 season with a major setback: the departure of its captain and best player, Gustavo Green, to direct rivals FC Barcelona. Furthermore, Carlos Soley, club secretary and midfielder, returned to his native Costa Rica. This led to a few changes in the board of directors: The then Hispania president José Ortiz took over as secretary to replace Soley, leaving the presidency of the club to Alesson. The 1901–02 Copa Macaya was won by Barcelona, in part thanks to Gustavo Green. By the end of 1902, Hispania was already in decline, but it still had the strength and courage to organize the third edition of its championship. Alesson was Hispania's president for as long as the club lasted, holding the position until its disappearance in November 1903, partly motivated by the departure of its most emblematic players, who joined other clubs, mainly FC Barcelona.

== Other activities ==
Alesson was one of the promoters of the foundation of the CF Badalona in 1903, and was also a member of the Sportsmen's Club, a multi-sport entity that existed between 1903 and 1906.

== Refereeing career ==
Alesson started to work as a referee around the time that Hispania began to decline in late 1902, officiating for the first time on 11 January 1903, in the opening match of the Copa Barcelona between FC Barcelona and Ibèria SC, which ended in a 7–0 victory to the former. In the following month, on 24 February 1903, he oversaw a friendly match between Club Español and Madrid FC at the Parc de la Ciutadella, ending in a goalless draw. In May 1903, the AC de F. organized two matches between two sides made up of the best players in Barcelona, both of whom held at the Hispania field in Muntaner, and Alesson, as the president of AC de F., refereed both of them; before repeating this feat on 8 September, this time on the field of Salud SC on the occasion of the Health neighborhood festivities. At the end of the year, in December 1903, he refereed a further two matches of FC Barcelona, a friendly against Club Español and then a Catalan football championship match against Català FC on 27 December, which ended in a 1–1 draw. He went on to officiate several matches in the Catalan championship.

On 26 September 1904, Alesson refereed the final of the Sportsmen's Club cup between FC Barcelona and FC Internacional, which ended in an extra-time 1–0 victory to the latter.

== Later life and death ==
Alesson then emigrated to Cuba, but returned to take charge of the Tiro Nacional fencing room in 1935. He died in 1951.
