= Team Anglès =

Football club in Spain active between 1899 and 1900

- Nickname: English Colony Team of Barcelona
- Founded: December 1899; 125 years ago.
- Dissolved: Mid-1900
- Ground: Velódromo de la Bonanova
Home colours

Team Anglès or English Colony Team, was a football scratch team based in Barcelona, Spain, which existed only during the year 1900, playing a total of four friendly matches against the likes of FC Barcelona and Català FC. The team mainly consisted of members of the British colony living in Barcelona, hence its name. Some historians ascribe this entity as "a group of thirty friends, English workers, who played alternately and without a regular squad".

They also played a massive role in FC Barcelona's beginnings, since Team Anglès merged with them on 13 December 1899, just two weeks after Barça was founded, and some of its players were prominent figures in Barça's early success. Furthermore, the British brought their more advanced knowledge of football to the region, a sport still relatively unknown in Barcelona at the time. Despite its very short life, the football teams of the English Colony of Barcelona left a big mark in the history of Catalan football.

== History ==
Team Anglès was formed in 1899 by members of the British colony living in Barcelona that had been playing football, among whom there were some figures who had played for the Sociedad de Foot-Ball de Barcelona of 1894–96, such as Henry W. Brown and the Parsons brothers, John and William. The latter also went on to found FC Barcelona on 29 November 1899.

Team Anglès made its debut against FC Barcelona, which was playing the very first match in its history that day, on 8 December, at the Velódromo de la Bonanova, ending in a 1–0 win in favor of the Britons, courtesy of a goal from Arthur Witty. Five days later, on 13 December, the Blaugrana team merged with Team Anglès, which meant a big leap in quality for the club, and as a result, Barcelona become one of the strongest teams in Catalonia at the turn of the century. Some of the British players that joined Barça were prominent figures in Barça's early success, such as the Wittys, the Parsons and the Morris brothers, and Stanley Harris, who went on to be the first Barça player to get a red card. This merge also lead to the expansion of Barça's board of directors with John Parsons becoming the vice-president of the club while his brother William was appointed as the new vice-captain of the team behind Joan Gamper, and when William left he was replaced by Ernest Witty.

On 26 December, Team Anglès faced a combination of FC Barcelona and Català FC, losing 2–1, courtesy of a brace from Gamper. Two weeks later, on 6 January 1900, the same scenario was held again, and Team Anglès achieved the revenge they were looking for with a comfortable 3–0 win. In this game, they used two players from Escocès FC, goalkeeper John Hamilton and defender Jim Dykes, who played alongside Henry W. Brown in defense, and together they kept a clean-sheet. On 9 March 1900, six players from Team Anglès reinforced Escocès FC, a team made up of Scottish workers from a factory in Sant Martí, in a match against HMS Calliope, a ship who had docked at the port of Barcelona. The game ended in a 2–3 loss, and naturally, the Scots blamed their misfortunes on their neighbors.

This entity, which like its predecessors was also never officially established, seems to disappear around 1900, and never to be reformed again.

== Notable players ==
- John and William Parsons: Originally from the Sociedad de Foot-Ball de Barcelona of 1894–96. John played in all of the team's four matches.
- Henry Wood: Originally from the Sociedad de Foot-Ball de Barcelona of 1894–96, he was one of the main figures of this entity, where he stood out as a great defender.

== Squad ==
Note: Flags indicate national team as defined under FIFA eligibility rules; some limited exceptions apply. Players may hold more than one non-FIFA nationality.

No.	Pos.	Nation	Player
—	GK	ENG	Raintree
—	GK	ENG	Samuel Morris (SF de Barcelona)
—	GK	ENG	John Hamilton (Escocès FC)
—	DF	ENG	Walker
—	DF	ENG	F. Ball
—	DF	ENG	Jim Dykes (Escocès FC)
—	DF	ENG	Henry W. Brown (SF de Barcelona)
—	MF	ENG	Webb
—	MF	ENG	John Henry Ball

No.	Pos.	Nation	Player
—	MF	ENG	Arthur Witty
—	MF	ENG	Morrison
—	MF	ENG	Enrique Morris (SF de Barcelona)
—	FW	ENG	William Parsons (SF de Barcelona)
—	FW	ENG	John Parsons (SF de Barcelona)
—	FW	ENG	Stanley Harris
—	FW	ENG	Fitzmaurice
—	FW	ENG	Ernest Witty
—	FW	ENG	Gordon Bastow

Note: Hamilton and Dykes were borrowed from Escocès FC for one match.

== Results ==
Team Anglès

8 December 1899	FC Barcelona	0 – 1	Team Anglès	Barcelona
15:00	Urruela; Wild, J. Lomba; Terradas, Ossó, Llobet; Künzli, Gamper, López, Schilling	La Vanguardia	A. Witty Raintree; Walker, Fitzmaurice; Webb, A. Witty, Morrison; W. Parsons, J. Parsons, E. Witty, Harris	Stadium: Velódromo de la Bonanova; Referee: Arthur Leask

26 December 1899	FC Barcelona + Català FC	2 – 1	Team Anglès	Barcelona
15:00	Gamper Urruela; Wild, F. Lomba; Valdés, Ossó, Llobet; Mir, Artús, Gamper, Planells, Soley	La Vanguardia	? A. Ball; F. Ball, Brown; J.A. Ball, A. Witty, Morrison; W. Parsons, J. Parsons, Fitzmaurice, E. Witty, Bastow	Stadium: Velódromo de la Bonanova; Referee: Arthur Leask (1st half); Alberto Serra (2nd half)

6 January 1900	FC Barcelona + Català FC	0 – 3	Team Anglès	Barcelona
15:00	Urruela; Wild, F. Lomba; Terradas, Ossó, Llobet; G. Busquets, J.A. Busquets, Gamper, Soley	La Vanguardia	? Hamilton; Dykes, Brown; S. Morris, A. Witty, Morrison; W. Parsons, J. Parsons, Fitzmaurice, E. Witty, Bastow	Stadium: Velódromo de la Bonanova; Referee: J. Candwell (1st half); Alberto Serra (2nd half)
Note: John Hamilton and Jim Dykes were borrowed from Escocès FC

9 March 1900	Team Anglès + Escocès FC	2 – 3	HMS Calliope	Barcelona
15:45	Girvan; Parsons Smart; Hamilton, Dykes; Denniston, Girvan, Harris, Gillespie, Parsons, J. Black, E. Witty, Bastow	Report	Way; Bain Roe; Chapman, Cleary; McYarlane, Way, Moorsom; Brock, Bain, Smith, Jackson, Robinson	Stadium: Velódromo de la Bonanova; Referee: William Mauchan

== See also ==
Football in Catalonia
