= Miguel Valdés (footballer) =

Spanish footballer

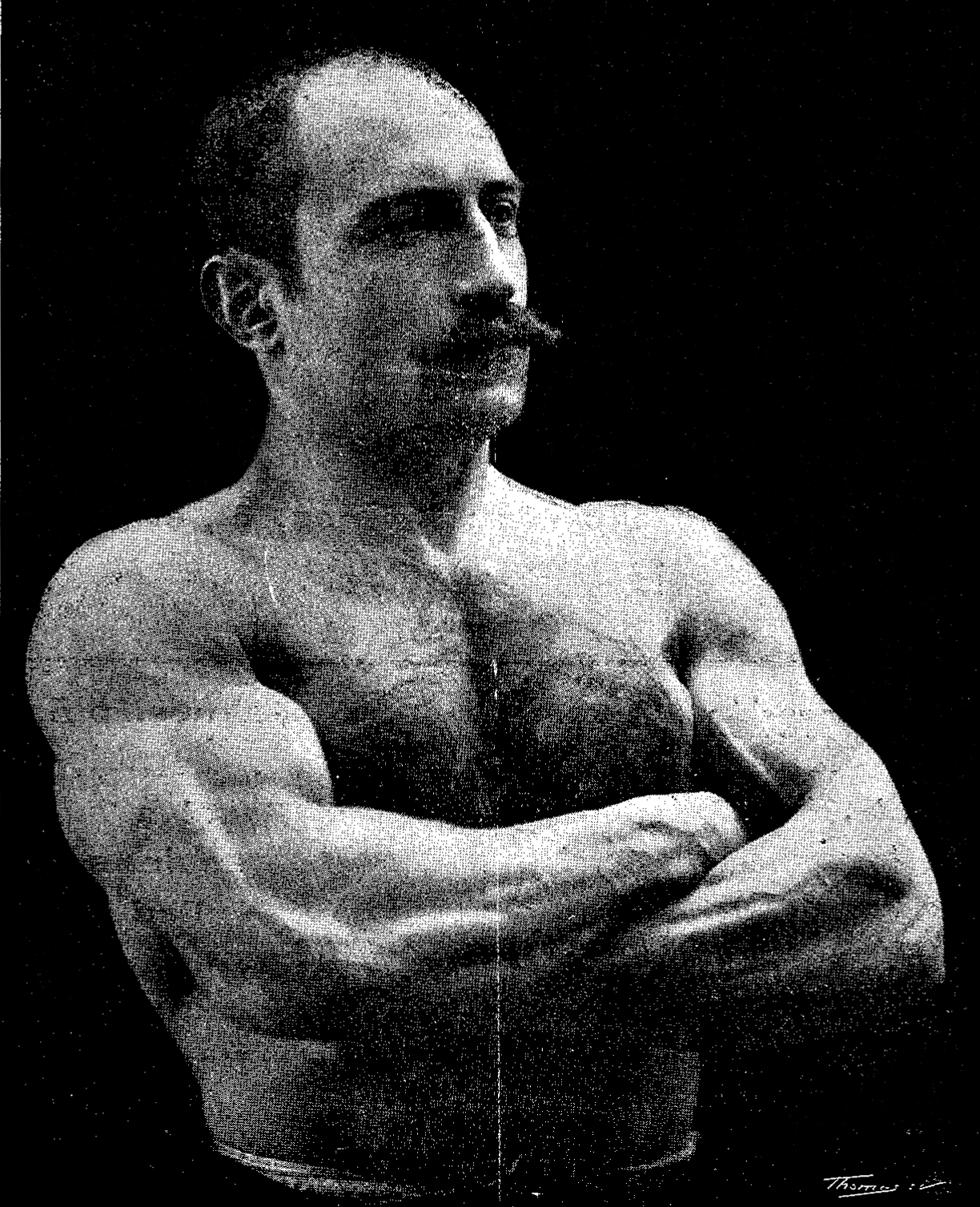
- Miguel Valdés

Personal information
- Birth name: Miquel Valdés i Padró
- Date of birth: 13 October 1867
- Place of birth: Barcelona, Catalonia, Spain
- Date of death: 5 May 1951 (aged 83)
- Place of death: Barcelona, Catalonia, Spain
- Position(s): Midfielder

Senior career*
Years	Team	Apps	(Gls)
1899–1900	Català FC		
1900–1902	FC Barcelona	14	(0)
1902–1903	Hispania AC	7	(0)
1903–1904	X Sporting Club		
- *Club domestic league appearances and goals

Miguel Valdés Padró (13 October 1867 - 5 May 1951) was a Spanish gymnast and footballer who played as a midfielder for Català FC and FC Barcelona. He was one of the founding members of Català FC in 1899, but immediately moved to city rivals FC Barcelona, which he helped to a win the 1901–02 Copa Macaya, the club's very first piece of silverware.

Besides football, he was also an outstanding athlete who also performed in other modalities such as boxing, rowing and gymnastics in the specialty of weightlifting and athletics. He was also a Spanish businessman, founder, and owner of Lotería Valdés, considered one of the most emblematic and popular lottery administrations in Barcelona and FC Barcelona's first unofficial meeting point.

== Early life ==
Born in Barcelona, he began his gymnastics career somewhere in the early 1890s, when he joined the Tolosa gymnasium, which was popular at the time for its innovative system created by Jaime Vila, a native of Lleida who worked at the Tolosa gym as a teacher. He practiced several sports including athletics, where he won several athletic events. He was the first Catalan athlete to be timed in the distance of 100 meters, on 18 November 1900 in Barcelona, reaching a mark of 12 seconds. He had also practiced boxing, rowing, and weight lifting.

== Footballing career ==
Football began taking root in the city in the late 1890s, and soon it gained followers among members belonging to the gym, by virtue of being an outdoor activity. As a lover of sport and physical culture, he also began practicing this new sport at the Velódromo de la Bonanova, and thus he was one of the founding members of Català FC in October 1899, with Valdés being appointed as the club's treasurer. However, he soon left for another newly founded club, FC Barcelona, where he was one of the first players to wear the club's shirt. His first match with the Barça shirt was the second in the club's history, on Christmas Eve of 1899, in a 3-1 victory over his former club, Català. During the first years of football in Catalonia, FC Barcelona and Català FC had a very strong rivalry and the polemics about who was the first official club of Barcelona (the club dean of the city) finished when the blaugranas proved that they had been the first club to be registered in the civil registry on 29 November, only a few days before Català FC, who did it on 17 December.

Together with Joan Gamper, Arthur Witty, and John Parsons, he was part of the side that competed in the inaugural edition of the Copa Macaya, the very first football competition played on the Iberian Peninsula, starting in the decisive match against Hispania AC which ended in a 1–1 draw that proved enough for Hispania to win the title. In the following season, however, Valdés played a crucial role in Barça's first-ever title, the 1901–02 Copa Macaya, being a solid physical presence in the midfield and starting in the tournament's final matchday on 23 March 1902 in a 15–0 victory over his former club. The Copa Macaya is now recognized as the first Catalan championship. At Barça, Valdés played for two seasons as a midfielder, and even though he did not score a single goal for the club, he was known for his skill as a ball retriever.

In addition to serving the club on the field, he was also a member of the board of directors as treasurer, thanks to his accounting experience. He was also in charge of preparing the playing fields. Back then, it was impossible to live exclusively out of football, and in Valdés' case, his source of income came from his tobacconist on La Rambla. In 1905 he received state permission to practice as a lottery, as well as a tobacconist, and thus, in 1905, he founded the Loteria Valdés at 95 La Rambla de Barcelona. Soon the cramped shop became the unofficial home of the young FC Barcelona, where players, fans, and members of the Board came to chat after dinner. The unusual opening hours of the lottery administration helped these impromptu gatherings. The lottery administration did not close until one in the morning, to take advantage of the euphoria of the wealthy spectators of the Liceu when leaving the night function. In addition, the lottery safe played a key role in the running of the club: it housed the expensive leather foot-balls imported from Great Britain. The back room of his premises became a warehouse for the club's sports equipment and a meeting point and gathering point for its members, with numerous club meetings being held at his premises on La Rambla. However, discrepancies with his teammates led him to leave FC Barcelona in 1902 to join direct rivals Hispania AC. After a short spell at X FC, he retired from football.

== Later life ==
Later he was a patron of the Unió Atlètica d'Horta, a club where he continued to play occasionally until he was 50 years old. Years later, in 1931, he returned as manager to FC Barcelona, assuming the vice presidency. The Loteria Valdés became one of the most popular lottery administrations in the country. In 1946 he handed out the Christmas jackpot, repeating five more times until 1988, in addition to giving four first prizes in the Children's raffle. A bad loser, he got upset the few times that another administration overtook him in sales. On the other hand, he had a very good relationship with Doña Manolita, who ran the oldest lottery administration in Spain. Valdés died on 5 June 1951 at the age of 83 and she died the next day, thus "it seems that they had finally agreed".

== Honours ==
FC Barcelona

- Copa Macaya:
  - Champions: 1901–02
  - Runner-up: 1900–01
