= Football in Catalonia =

Football is the most important sport in Catalonia and was introduced in the late 19th century by a combination of mostly British immigrant workers and visiting sailors, and students returning from Britain. Catalonia led the way in the development of football in Spain, organizing both the first association and the first championship. Today football in Catalonia is organized by the Catalan Football Federation and the RFEF and teams from Catalonia compete in La Liga, the Copa del Rey, the Copa Catalunya and several European competitions.

== History ==
=== Pioneering age ===
In the late 19th century Catalonia enjoyed the most developed industry in the country, mainly thanks to its cotton industry, and for this reason, Barcelona became one of the best places for foreigners to disembark in and do business, and being the British one of the most enterprising nation at the time, Barcelona soon became the home to a British colony, who like in the rest of the world, brought football with them. Football first entered Catalonia thanks to the British colony that worked and lived there (and later through the Catalans returning from studying abroad), among whom a certain James Reeves stood out. He arrived in Barcelona at some point in 1892, a time when football was a sport practically unknown in the city. The Barcelona Cricket Club of Ronda de Sant Pere, founded by Britons a year earlier (debuted on 28 August 1891), was the only sign of football in Catalonia, as they played cricket in the summer and then football in the winter (which was common at the time). However, they were a strictly British club, so Reeves, an enthusiastic and passionate lover of the game, decided to create a football club that would include British and Catalans alike, and indeed, he convinced a number of Catalan (and French) members of Club Regatas de Barcelona (a club of rowing and sailing) to practice football. This club became simply known as British Club or British Club de Barcelona.

After months of recruiting they organized and played the first known football match in the city (actually in the neighboring municipality of Sants), which was held on the grounds near the Hippodrome of Can Tunis on 25 December 1892. Very little is known about that Christmas Day, only that it was the work of members of the Royal Regatta Club and members of the British Club located on Rambla dels Capuchins. Notable figures in the first years of this football Society include the Morris brothers (Samuel, Enrique and Miguel), captain Reeves and the Catalan Alberto Serra.

During the winter of 1893–94 the so-called English colony from Barcelona faced the Scottish colony from Sant Martí in a series of matches that local historians claim to have been the first ever 'unofficial' rivalry in Spanish football. The Scottish colony's history began in 1893, when John Shields and Edward B. Steegmann rented the central warehouses of a factory in Sant Martí, and then sent a group of around 40 young Scottish workers to work in the company's newly opened factory, known in Catalonia as La Escocesa. These two colonies were fundamental in the history of Catalan football as they would go on to create Team Anglès and Escocès FC respectively, two teams who played a pivotal role in the amateur beginnings of football in Catalonia, most notably in FC Barcelona's beginnings.

In late 1894 the British Club de Barcelona seems to change its name to Sociedad de Foot-Ball de Barcelona (Barcelona Football Society), and in 1895, they also changed fields, leaving the Hippodrome of Can Tunis to settle at the Velódromo de la Bonanova, because this group of football pioneers in the city was looking for a place of easier access to the city center. From then on, Sunday football games became a regular event at Bonanova, although its vast majority were training matches (Blues vs Reds). In 1895, the Barcelona team played two matches against a team from Torelló, Torelló Foot-ball Association, and this marked another historic milestone in Catalan football since it was the very first time that teams from two different cities played against each other in Catalonia. When James Reeves returned to the United Kingdom in the autumn of 1895, the entity, which was never officially established, began to declined, and around 1896 it seems to disappear, and for this reason, no Briton played football in Catalonia (that we know of) in 1897 and 1898. They only began to play again in 1899, with the emergence of Team Anglès.

=== 1900s ===
Even though the first games played in Catalonia trace back as soon as 1892, the first official and registered football club was Palamós Foot-Ball Club (Costa Brava, North of Catalonia), which was founded in 1898 by Gaspar Matas. Although Gimnàstic de Tarragona was formed in 1886, the club did not form an actual football team until 1914. Their first match was against Fàbrica Armstrong de Palafrugell, beating Palamós by 2 to 1. But the city where football experienced the greater and stronger growth was, logically, the city of Barcelona.

After a few years of "silence" (1896–1898), football returned to the city of Barcelona at the end of 1899 to stay there for good. This new sport began taking root in the city in the 1890s, and soon gained followers among the youth, and most importantly, among that generation of Barcelona gymnasts, due to its outdoor nature. That is why the first football clubs in Barcelona were born in gymnasiums, and under the protection and encouragement of characters linked to the Spanish Gymnastics Federation such as Narciso Masferrer and Jaime Vila. Those two were the directors of the Solé and Tolosa Gyms respectively, and together with Joan Gamper and Walter Wild, they were the fundamental heads behind the foundations of the first football clubs in Barcelona, Foot-Ball Club Barcelona and Català Futbol Club, which were both founded in late 1899. During the first years of football in Catalonia, they had a strong rivalry and the polemics about who was the first official club of Barcelona (the club dean of the city) finished when the blaugranas proved that they had been the first club to be registered in the civil registry on 29 November, only a few days before Català FC, who did it on 17 December. FC Barcelona played its very first match on 8 December against Team Anglès, the team formed by the members of the British colony living in Barcelona, and ended in a 1–0 win in favor of the Britons, courtesy of a goal from Arthur Witty. Five days later, on 13 December, FC Barcelona merged with the Britons, which meant a big leap in quality for the club, and as a result, Barça become one of the strongest teams in Catalonia at the turn of the century. Some of the British players that joined Barça were prominent figures in Barça's early success, such as the Parsons (John and William) and the Witty brothers (Arthur and Ernest).

The football context of Barcelona at the turn of the century was remarkably prolific as several football clubs were founded around that period. In addition to the classic FC Barcelona of Joan Gamper and Sociedad Española de Football (now RCD Espanyol) of Ángel Rodríguez, founded in 1899 and 1900 respectively, and the unofficial dean Català FC of Jaime Vila, there were numerous entities dedicated to the practice of football such as Escocès FC (ex Sant Andreu), Hispania AC (ex Team Rojo), University SC, FC Internacional, Irish Football Club and others, made up the list of teams that competed for local hegemony in the first and archaic competitions that were held, such as the Copa Macaya, which was the first-ever tournament held in the Iberian Peninsula. Several clubs also emerged with a reference to Spain in their title. These included the aforementioned Hispania AC and Sociedad Española, both formed in 1900, and FC Espanya de Barcelona.

The aforementioned Copa Macaya was named in honor of the donator of the trophy Alfonso Macaya, the then president of Hispania AC, who emerged as the winners of its first tournament held between January and April 1901 after narrowly beating FC Barcelona, who then won the second edition in 1902. These two tournaments set the scene for the first great stars of Catalan football to emerge such as Gustavo Green, Udo Steinberg and none other than the fundamental head behind the founding of FC Barcelona in 1899, Swiss-born Joan Gamper, who was the top scorer in both tournaments with 31 and 19 goals respectively.

The Catalan Football Federation (Catalan: Federació Catalana de Futbol), responsible for administering football in Catalonia, was the first football association founded in Spain. It was formed on 11 November 1900 as the Football Association of Catalonia (Catalan: Football Associació de Catalunya). The Catalan Football Federation organized the Catalan football championship (Catalan: Campionat de Catalunya) that was the first football competition in Spain.

It was again a Hispania AC president, Eduardo Alesson, together with Joan Gamper, who promoted the creation of what would become the current Catalan Football Federation, which was the first football federation created in Spain. The founding meeting took place in December 1902 and Alesson was elected the Association's first president. The original members included FC Barcelona, Sociedad Española de Football, Català SC and Hispania AC. After 1903 the championship was organized by the Football Associació de Catalunya and it became known as the Campionat de Catalunya, and they recognized the Macaya Cup as the first edition of the Campionat de Catalunya. The winners also began to represent Catalonia in the Copa del Rey. By 1917 the league had turned professional and included a second division.

=== 1910s ===
The second decade of the 20th century was characterized, in terms of football in our country, by the birth of the rivalry between FC Barcelona and Espanyol. During those years the two clubs had already become the most important in Catalonia and this led to many confrontations and disputes between them. The games between them were very harsh, and constant incidents led to the relations between them being broken. Two legendary figures stood out: Paulino Alcántara and George Pattullo.

=== 1920s ===
From 1920 until the Spanish Civil War, football achieved enormous popularity and acceptance in Catalonia. In the decade 1920–30, there is already football all over the country. The rivalry between Espanyol and Barcelona is getting stronger and stronger and this causes passions to be unleashed during these years. Two legendary figures stood out: Ricardo Zamora and Josep Samitier.

On the other hand, in 1920 the Spanish team participated for the first time in an international competition, the Antwerp Olympics, where they won the silver medal. The first selector was the Catalan Paco Bru, and among the players chosen (selected entirely from Catalan, Basque and Galician clubs) we find Barcelona players Ricardo Zamora, Josep Samitier, Agustin Sancho and Félix Sesúmaga.

== La Liga ==
Since La Liga was founded in 1929, eight Catalan clubs have played in the Primera División, six of which are still active today. FC Barcelona have never been relegated, while RCD Espanyol have spent most of their history in the top division. Girona FC debuted in Primera División in 2017–18 and later returned after relegation. CE Sabadell FC are the non-top-flight Catalan club with the most Primera División seasons. Gimnàstic de Tarragona and CE Europa also competed several seasons in the league, with Europa being one of La Liga’s founding members alongside Barcelona and Espanyol. Meanwhile, the now-defunct CD Condal and UE Lleida made only brief appearances in the top division.

Twelve other Catalan clubs have played in the Segunda División, six of which currently compete in semi-professional divisions (tiers 3–5): FC Barcelona Atlètic (formed from the merger of CD Condall), Terrassa FC, UE Sant Andreu, CF Badalona, CE L'Hospitalet, and CFJ Mollerussa. In addition, four other clubs currently play in the regional non-professional divisions: CE Júpiter, UE Figueres, Palamós CF, and EC Granollers. Meanwhile, Som Maresme FC (formerly UE Llagostera) are currently on hiatus due to being unable to compete in any division, while CF Reus Deportiu have been dissolved.

=== Professional & Semi-Professional Football Clubs in Catalonia ===
These are the professional and semi-professional football clubs in Catalonia that have competed up to the Segunda División level or higher.

Club	Established	League	Level	Home Ground	Capacity	Home City	Province
FC Barcelona	1899	Primera División	1	Camp Nou	105,000 (expected)	Barcelona	Barcelona
RCD Espanyol (Note: From 1923 to 1997, the club played its home matches at Estadi de Sarrià in Barcelona. In 1997, the club moved to the municipally owned Estadi Olímpic Lluís Companys. Since 2009, the club has played at the newly built Estadi Cornellà-El Prat in Cornellà de Llobregat.)	1900	Primera División	1	Estadi Cornellà-El Prat	40,500	Cornellà de Llobregat, Metropolitan Area of Barcelona	Barcelona
Girona FC	1930	Primera División	1	Estadi Montilivi	14,624	Girona	Girona
CE Sabadell FC	1903	Primera Federación	3	Estadi de la Nova Creu Alta	11,908	Sabadell	Barcelona
Gimnàstic de Tarragona	1914	Primera Federación	3	Nou Estadi Costa Daurada	14,591	Tarragona	Tarragona
CE Europa	1907	Primera Federación	3	Nou Sardenya	4,000	Barcelona	Barcelona
FC Barcelona Atlètic (Note: From 1982 to 2019, the club played its home matches at Mini Estadi, located opposite Camp Nou in Barcelona. In 2019, the club moved to the newly built Estadi Johan Cruyff in Sant Joan Despí, situated within the Ciutat Esportiva Joan Gamper, FC Barcelona's training ground and youth academy.)	1970	Segunda Federación	4	Estadi Johan Cruyff	6,000	Sant Joan Despí, Metropolitan Area of Barcelona	Barcelona
Terrassa FC	1906	Segunda Federación	4	Estadi Olímpic de Terrassa	7,500	Terrassa	Barcelona
UE Sant Andreu	1909	Segunda Federación	4	Camp Narcís Sala	6,563	Barcelona	Barcelona
CF Badalona	1903	Tercera Federación	5	Estadi de Badalona	4,170	Badalona, Metropolitan Area of Barcelona	Barcelona
CE L'Hospitalet	1957	Tercera Federación	5	Estadi de L'Hospitalet	6,740	L'Hospitalet de Llobregat, Metropolitan Area of Barcelona	Barcelona
CFJ Mollerussa	1919	Tercera Federación	5	Camp de Mollerussa	4,000	Mollerussa	Lleida

== Copa Catalunya ==
In 1984 following the restoration of the democracy in Spain, a new competition for Catalan clubs was organized. The Copa Generalitat was not initially recognized by the RFEF and only teams from the Spanish Third Division entered. After 1990 however the Copa Generalitat, now organized by the Federació Catalana de Futbol, became an official competition and Catalan clubs in La Liga began to enter. In 1993 it was renamed the Copa Catalunya. The competition has gradually diminished in prestige and FC Barcelona and RCD Espanyol rarely field strong teams.

== See also ==
- Football in Spain
- Football in France
- List of Catalan footballers
- Sport in Catalonia
