= Francisco Cruzate =

Spanish athlete and footballer

Personal information
- Full name: Francisco Cruzate Grenzner
- Birth name: Francesc Cruzate i Grenzner
- Date of birth: 7 July 1878
- Place of birth: Barcelona, Spain
- Date of death: 2 September 1910 (aged 32)
- Place of death: Barcelona, Spain
- Position: Forward

Senior career*
Years	Team	Apps	(Gls)
1899–1902	FC Barcelona	5	(0)
- * Club domestic league appearances and goals

Francisco Cruzate Grenzner (7 July 1878 – 2 September 1910) was a Spanish footballer who played as a forward for FC Barcelona during the first three seasons of the club's life and an athlete who stood out in athletic events, being considered the first Spanish record holder in the 800 metres run, which he set on 25 November 1900.

== Biography ==
On 10 December 1899, Cruzate participated in the first organized athletic event held in Spain, which took place in the surroundings of the Casanovas hotel in Barcelona, currently occupied by the San Pablo hospital, and consisted of a race over approximately 800m (two 400-meter straights and a curve), which he won ahead of second-placed Joan Gamper, who had founded FC Barcelona just two weeks before, on 29 November, and who had played in the club's first-ever match just two days before. Cruzate, however, only debuted for Barça two weeks later, on Christmas Eve, in a 3–1 win over Català FC. He played a further four matches for Barcelona between 1900 and 1902, although he did not get to play any official matches, only friendly matches.

In November 1900, on the occasion of the inauguration of the first FC Barcelona field, also next to the Casanovas hotel (supposedly on the same site where the previous year's race took place), two races were organized, 100 and 800 meters, this one going around the field four times, unlike the one organized the previous year, which had much longer straights. Cruzate participated in both, coming third in the 100 meters, behind Fermín Lomba and Miguel Valdés, and then, on 25 November, he proclaimed himself the winner of the longest race with a time of 2 minutes and 41 seconds, the first 800-meter record, which he held for 14 years until it was finally broken by Sócrates Quintana of the Gimnástica Española on 6 April 1914.

According to the press of 20 October 1900, Cruzate was named director of foot races for FC Barcelona, a kind of precedent for the club's athletics section. He had a testimonial participation as a football player, but later he became a very active element in recruiting new players for the Blaugrana club.

In his personal life, he was the owner of a wholesale clothing store. Cruzate died of a heart attack on 2 September 1910, at 32 years old.
