= Pedraja =

Pedraja is a Spanish surname. Notable people with the surname include:

- Ignacio Neira Pedraja (born 1986), Spanish footballer
- Luis G. Pedraja (born 1963), Cuban-born theologian, philosopher, author, scholar, and educator
- Pedro Pedraja (born 1974), Spanish painter

== See also ==
- De la Pedraja
- Castle of Pedraja
