= Camp del carrer Muntaner =

Sports venue in Barcelona (1902–1923)

Camp del Carrer Muntaner
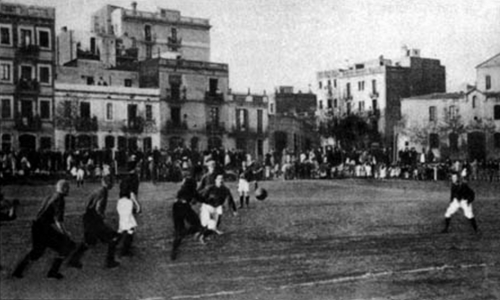
- Football match at the Camp del Carrer Muntaner in 1900
- Interactive map of Camp del Carrer Muntaner
- Location: Barcelona, Catalonia, Spain

Construction
- Opened: 1902
- Demolished: 1923
- Cost: 30.000 pesetas

Tenants
- Hispania AC (1902–1903) FC Barcelona (1905–1909) RCD Espanyol (1911–1923)

The Camp del Carrer Muntaner (Catalan: Field on the Muntaner street), popularly known as Camp de les Faves, was a football field in the Eixample district of the city of Barcelona, located between the current streets of Paris, London, Casanova and Muntaner, hence its name. It was the fourth playing field of FC Barcelona.

In March 1909 it became a velodrome, known as Velòdrom Parc d'Sports, and under that name, it hosted both the first marathon and the first field hockey game in Spain. In 1911, it regained its status as a football field and was rented by RCD Espanyol. It had dimensions of 105 x 65 meters and a capacity for 8,000 spectators.

== Football ==
This field and ground was located between the current streets of Indústria (now Paris), Coello (now London), Casanova and Muntaner, hence its name, next to the Clinical Hospital and the Faculty of Medicine. It was privately owned, and the first club to use it was Hispania AC, between 1902 and 1903, the same year the club disappeared. On 6 January 1902, FC Barcelona played its first-ever match in Muntaner against Hispania AC, in a fixture of the 1901–02 Copa Macaya, which ended in a 4–2 victory for the visiting side thanks to goals from Alfonso Albéniz, Joan Gamper (2), and John Parsons.

Between its foundation in 1899 and 1905, FC Barcelona played in three different stadiums, Velódromo de la Bonanova, the grounds of Hotel Casanovas, and the field on Horta street. Their difficulty in finding permanent grounds was due to economic instability and the lack of large open-air spaces at a time when the city was undergoing urban expansion. In 1905, Barça rented the Muntaner field, playing its first match there on 26 February 1905, against Català FC, the same team that took over the former Bonanova Velodrome; Barça lost 2–3. Barça there until 1909, when it moved to the neighboring Camp de la Indústria. During this period, the Blaugrana also played some matches in the Plaza de Armas field, in Parc de la Ciutadella, and the Fuixarda field, owned by the City Council.

== Velodrome ==
At the beginning of 1909, the field was turned into a velodrome at the initiative of the Belgian cyclist Victor Touron. The works started on 18 January and on 28 March 1909, it was inaugurated under the name Velòdrom Parc d'Sports (Sports Park Velodrome). In 1909, the Velodrome hosted the Spanish Sprint and Middle Distance Championships, but spectator attendance and revenues were low, which led to the sale of the business in early 1910. The velodrome was reopened by retired Italian cyclist Francesco Alberici on 30 January 1910.

Despite its ephemeral existence, it is known for two dates: on 15 February 1910, the first marathon held in Spain took place there, and on 23 May 1910, the first field hockey match in Spain, which was organized by Alberici.

== Decline and Collapse ==
The following year, the track was demolished and then converted into a football field once again, thus regaining its status as a football field. It was then rented by RCD Espanyol, who played their first match there on 26 February 1911, in a match against Club Español de Madrid, which they defeated 2–0. Espanyol remained there until they moved to the Sarrià Stadium in 1923.
