= De la Pedraja =

De la Pedraja is a Spanish surname. Notable people with the surname include:

- Fermín Lomba de la Pedraja (1877–1946), Spanish footballer
- José Lomba de la Pedraja (1868–1951), Spanish professor, researcher, and footballer
- Octavio de la Concepción de la Pedraja (1935–1967), Cuban doctor, guerrilla, and military man
- René De La Pedraja (born 1951), American professor and author
