= Fermín Lomba =

Spanish footballer (1877–1946)

Personal information
- Full name: Fermín Amadeo Agustín Lomba de la Pedraja
- Date of birth: 7 July 1877
- Place of birth: Marina de Cudeyo, Cantabria, Spain
- Date of death: 20 April 1946 (aged 68)
- Place of death: Madrid, Spain
- Positions: Defender; midfielder

Senior career*
Years	Team	Apps	(Gls)
1900	Catalá FC	+4	(0)
1900	Team Roig	1	(0)
1900–1901	Hispania AC	+8	(+1)
- * Club domestic league appearances and goals

Fermín Amadeo Agustín Lomba de la Pedraja (7 July 1877 – 20 April 1946) was a Spanish footballer who played as a midfielder and forward for Catalá FC and Hispania AC in 1900 and 1901, helping the later club became the first-ever to win an official title in Spanish football, the 1900–01 Copa Macaya, which was the very first football competition played on the Iberian Peninsula.

His older brother José was also a footballer.

== Early life ==
Fermín Lomba was born on 7 July 1877 in Marina de Cudeyo, Cantabria, as the child of José Ramón Lomba de los Cuetos (1830–1891) and Amanda de la Pedraja Cuesta (1840–1928). He was the fifth of seven children, including José (1868–1951).

== Football career ==
=== Catalá FC ===
Lomba moved to Barcelona in the late 19th century, to continue his studies. He began to practice football, a sport relatively unknown at the time, at the Velódromo de la Bonanova with some friends and his brother José. He developed a much more attacking game than José, who preferred to use his experience on defense. At some point in late 1899, the Lomba brothers joined the ranks of Català FC, which had just become the first football team formed in Catalonia in October. They might even have belonged to the group of football enthusiasts led by Jaime Vila that formed the club in a meeting held at the Tolosa gym, although this assumption remains unconfirmed.

Català was soon followed by Joan Gamper's FC Barcelona, who was suffering from a lack of players for their debut; in the end, his brother José played for Barça, the club's first-ever match. This became a running theme in their careers as Català and Barcelona kept joining the best players of each team in their next few matches, and José was always selected while Fermín never made it to the starting eleven of any of these mixed teams, and indeed, it was only with an "unmixed" Català FC side that he finally managed to make his debut on 28 January 1900, playing as a forward alongside his brother, who played as a goalkeeper in an eventual 0–6 loss. Two weeks later, however, on 11 February, Català once again combined forces with a neighboring team, this time Escocès FC, to play against FC Barcelona, and despite the inclusion of six players from Escocès, José was still selected while Fermín remained in the bench once again because although he was 9 years younger, it was his brother's experience and superior knowledge of the game that were sought after.

Between 25 February and 29 April, Català faced the Scots six times, but Català kept fielding some Escocès players, such as Gustavo Green and Joseph Black (among others), and naturally, some of the Català players were unhappy about this, especially Lomba, as it prevented him from becoming an undisputed starter once and for all. This growing dissatisfaction within the club caused him to join the group of dissent Català players who left the club to form a new one, Team Rojo, which later became Hispania AC.

=== Hispania AC ===
Together with Green and Carlos Soley, Lomba played in the first-ever match of Team Rojo on 24 May against FC Barcelona, which ended in a 2–1 loss. At the beginning of October 1900, the players of Team Rojo decided to legally establish themselves as a company, under the name of Hispania Athletic Club, and the board of directors was subsequently elected, with Lomba being named the club's vice-president.

Two months later, Hispania AC organized the first edition of the Copa Macaya in 1901, which was the first football championship played on the Iberian Peninsula, and the forerunner for the Catalan championship which began in 1903. Together with Green, Soley, and the Morris brothers (Samuel and Enrique), Lomba was part of the Hispania team that become the very first Spanish club to win an official title, being a solid physical presence in the midfield and starting in the decisive match against Barça on 14 April 1901, in which he played a crucial role in helping his side held a 1–1 draw. Lomba even scored once to help his side to a 14–0 trashing of Tarragona.

== Personal life ==
Lomba married Carmen Veglison Eizaguirre on 12 October 1901.

== Death ==
Lomba died in Madrid on 20 April 1946, at the age of 68.

== Honours ==
Hispania AC

- Copa Macaya:
  - Champions: 1900–01
