= John Parsons (footballer, born 1875) =

Spanish footballer

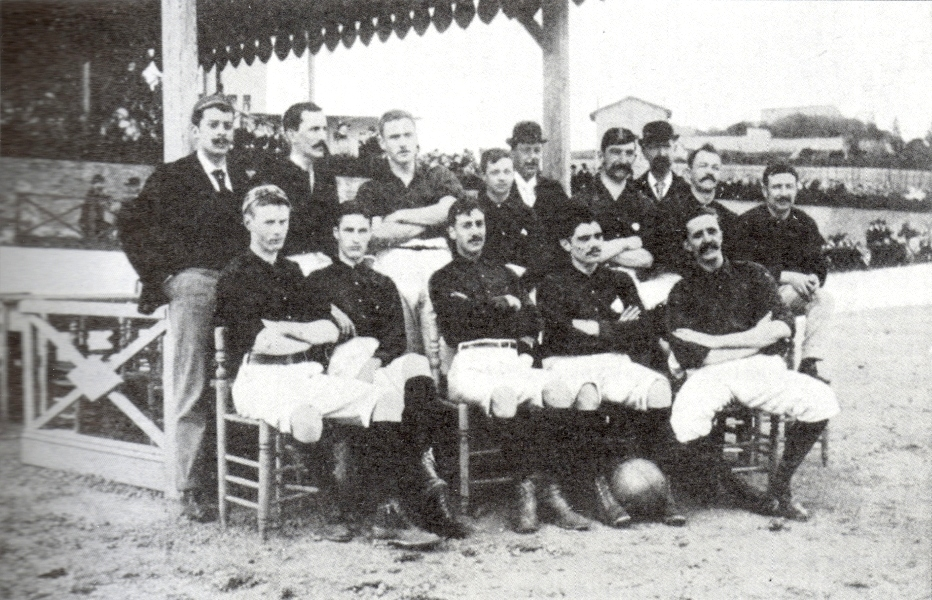
- John (seated, the first from the left), in 1895.

Personal information
- Full name: John Parsons Alexander
- Date of birth: 14 April 1875
- Place of birth: Barcelona, Catalonia, Spain
- Date of death: 18 November 1960 (aged 85)
- Place of death: Barcelona, Spain
- Position: Forward

Senior career*
Years	Team	Apps	(Gls)
1895–1896	Sociedad de Foot-Ball de Barcelona	+3	(+3)
1899	Team Anglès	+2	(+1)
1899–1904	FC Barcelona	41	(15)
- * Club domestic league appearances and goals

John Parsons Alexander (14 April 1875 – 18 November 1960), was an Anglo-Spanish footballer who played as a forward for FC Barcelona. His younger brother, William, followed him every step through.

Together with his brother, he is regarded as one of the most important figures in the amateur beginnings of football in Catalonia, taking part in some of the earliest Catalan clubs in existence such as Sociedad de Foot-Ball de Barcelona, where he stood out as a great striker, netting some of the first goals in the history of Catalan football. Parsons is best known for his role in FC Barcelona's beginnings, being among the 11 founders of the club in 1899, and then serving the club as its vice-president between 1900 and 1901 and as a player between 1899 and 1904, netting 15 goals in 41 appearances, and helping his side win the 1901–02 Copa Macaya, the club's very first trophy, and helping his side reach the final of the 1902 Copa de la Coronación, in which he scored in a 2–1 loss. He was also a great fan of philately, receiving several awards and distinctions throughout his life.

== Early life ==
His family, of English origins, settled in Barcelona in 1870, where Parsons was born on 14 April 1875.

== Sporting career ==
=== Barcelona Cricket Club ===
In the early 1890s, Parsons and his younger brother William became members of the British Club de Barcelona, where they practiced several modalities such as cricket with the Barcelona Cricket Club.

=== Sociedad de Foot-Ball de Barcelona ===
Together with his brother William, he was one of the first pioneers of football in Catalonia, joining the Sociedad de Foot-Ball de Barcelona in 1895, a team made up of a group of football pioneers who had been playing in Catalonia since 1892. On 27 January 1895, Parsons was one of 16 footballers who featured in the first football match played in Bonanova, playing for the Reds in a 1–4 loss to a Blue team that featured his younger brother. On 2 February 1895, he played in another training match and this time he scored twice to help the Blues to a 4–1 victory. Parsons also played both games against Asociación de Foot-Ball de Torelló on 24 March and 14 April 1895, which was the very first time that teams from two different cities played against each other in Catalonia, and he rose to the occasion, netting a brace at Bonanova in an 8–3 local win and another one at Torelló in a 3–5 loss.

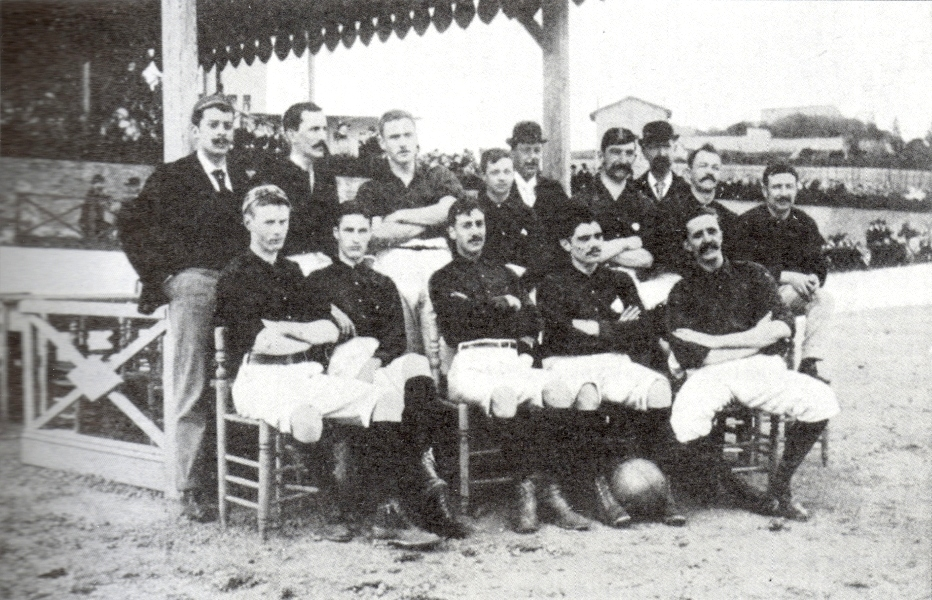
John Parsons seated, first from the left, next to other pioneers of Catalan football such as his brother William, the Morris brothers, James Reeves, and Alberto Serra.

Parsons played several friendly matches at Can Tunis and a few others at Bonanova between 1892 and 1895, where he stood out as a great goal scorer, however, due to the little statistical rigor that the newspapers had at that time, the exact number of goals he netted is unknown. Despite some encouraging first steps, this Society was never officially established and when its founder and captain James Reeves returned to the United Kingdom in the autumn of 1895, it was the Catalans and the Parsons brothers who took the reins of the team, but without Reeves, the entity soon declined, collapsed and seems to disappear around 1896.

=== Team Anglès ===
Football in the city then crosses its first crisis which lasted three years from 1896 until 1899, with the Parsons playing an important role in the sport's return to the city in 1899, helping with the creations of Team Anglès and FC Barcelona in 1899.

=== FC Barcelona ===
Parsons and his brother were among the eleven men who attended the infamous meeting held at the Gimnasio Solé on 29 November 1899 which saw the birth of Foot-Ball Club Barcelona. However, in Barcelona's official debut on 8 December 1899, the two Parsons brothers played for the rival team, Team Anglès, which consisted of members of the British colony living in Barcelona.

Together with Bartomeu Terradas, Arthur Witty and team captain Joan Gamper, he was part of the Barça side that participated in the first regulated football championship played on the Iberian Peninsula, the Copa Macaya in 1900–01, in which he scored 8 goals, including two hat-tricks in 0–13 and 14–0 trashings of Franco-Española, but despite his goalscoring prowess, Barça finished the tournament as runner-ups to Hispania AC. These 8 goals earned him a spot in the top scorers of the tournament only behind Gustavo Green(9) and Joan Gamper(31). In the following season, however, he helped Barcelona win the 1901–02 Copa Macaya, the club's first-ever piece of silverware, netting two goals on the final matchday on 23 March 1902 in a 15–0 victory over Català FC. The Copa Macaya is now recognized as the first Catalan championship.

In 1902, Parsons was a member of the Barcelona team that participated in the Copa de la Coronación (predecessor of Copa del Rey), featuring in the semi-finals against Real Madrid (then Madrid FC), the very first El Clásico in history, and in the final, where he scored Barça's only goal in a 1–2 loss to Club Vizcaya.

In 1903, Parsons added a new title to his career, the Copa Barcelona, which was later recognized as the fourth edition of the Catalan Championship. He also served the club outside the pitch, being its vice-president between December 1900 and November 1901 under the presidency of Walter Wild.

== Later life ==
In 1912, Parsons, together with Joan Gamper, Udo Steinberg and Arthur Witty, joined the Comité Athlétic of FC Barcelona as a referee and under the presidency of Joaquín Peris de Vargas.

Parsons founded a dye factory and dry cleaners under the name of Juan Parsons & Sons.

== Death ==
Parsons died in Barcelona on 18 November 1960 at the age of 85.

== Honours ==
FC Barcelona

- Copa Macaya:
  - Champions: 1901–02
  - Runner-up: 1900–01
- Copa Barcelona:
  - Champions: Copa Barcelona
- Copa de la Coronación:
  - Runner-up: 1902
