= Juan de Urruela =

Spanish footballer

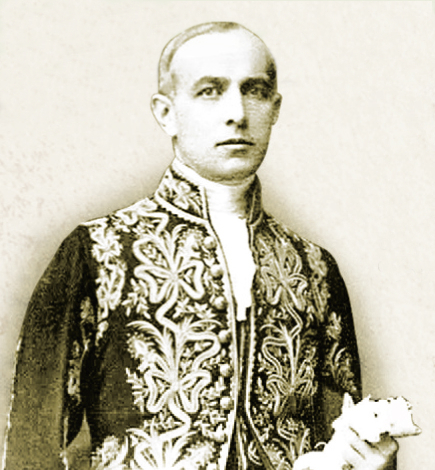
- Juan de Urruela

Personal information
- Full name: Juan de Urruela Morales
- Birth name: Juan Francisco José de Urruela y Morales
- Date of birth: 29 January 1881
- Place of birth: Guatemala City, Guatemala
- Date of death: 16 December 1947 (aged 66)
- Place of death: Barcelona, Catalonia, Spain
- Position: Goalkeeper

Senior career*
| Years | Team | Apps | (Gls) |
| 1899–1900 | FC Barcelona | 4 | (0) |
- * Club domestic league appearances and goals

Juan Francisco José de Urruela Morales (29 January 1881 - 16 December 1947) was a Guatemalan of Spanish descent footballer who played as a goalkeeper for FC Barcelona at the turn of the century. He is best known for being the very first goalkeeper to wear the FC Barcelona shirt when he played as such in the club's first-ever game on 8 December 1899.

== Early life ==
Born in Guatemala City on 29 January 1881, Urruela was the eldest brother and fourth of five children. Despite being born in Guatemala, he had Spanish nationality, since his grandparents were born in that country.

During his teenage years, he emigrated to Spain and settled in Barcelona, where on 25 June 1907, he married Àgueda Sanllehy Girona, daughter of the Marquises of Caldes de Montbui.

== Sporting career ==
=== Football ===
I cannot end without making special mention of a hotly contested point that was saved by the "goal-keeper" of the "Barcelona Club", Mr. Urruela, who was greeted with applause by the attendees, enthusiastic about the vehemence with which the ball was defended.

— Alberto Serra

On 8 December 1899, Urruela went down in history as one of the ten footballers who started in Barcelona's first-ever match, which was held at the Velódromo de la Bonanova against a team made up of the city's English colony known as Team Anglès, starting as a goalkeeper in an eventual 1–0 loss to the English, courtesy of a goal from Arthur Witty. In doing so, he not only became the first Guatemelan to wear the Barça jersey, but also the first Central American to do so. Despite this defeat, the local newspaper La Vanguardia highlighted Urruela's good performance in a chronicle written by Alberto Serra.

Juan de Urruela played a further two matches for Barça, the first on the 1899 Christmas Eve against Català FC (3–1), and on 26 December against Team Anglès (2–1), forming part of a combined team with players from Barcelona and Català in the latter two matches.

=== Water polo ===
Urruela was one of the great sportsmen of the early twentieth century, being also an outstanding tennis and water polo player, practicing the latter at the Real Club de Polo de Barcelona, and becoming a champion at both sports. In March 1915, he refereed a water polo match between two teams made up of members of Sociedad de Can Rabia, most notably Juan José Petit, who at the time also played football for Madrid FC.

== Later life ==
Being an aristocrat of Spanish descent, King Alfonso XIII granted him Spanish nationality in December 1909, together with his younger brother, and in 1916 he restored the Marquesado de San Román de Ayala, a noble title that had been held by his ancestors.

He was the great-grandfather of the designer Ágata Ruiz de la Prada.
