= William Parsons (footballer) =

Spanish footballer

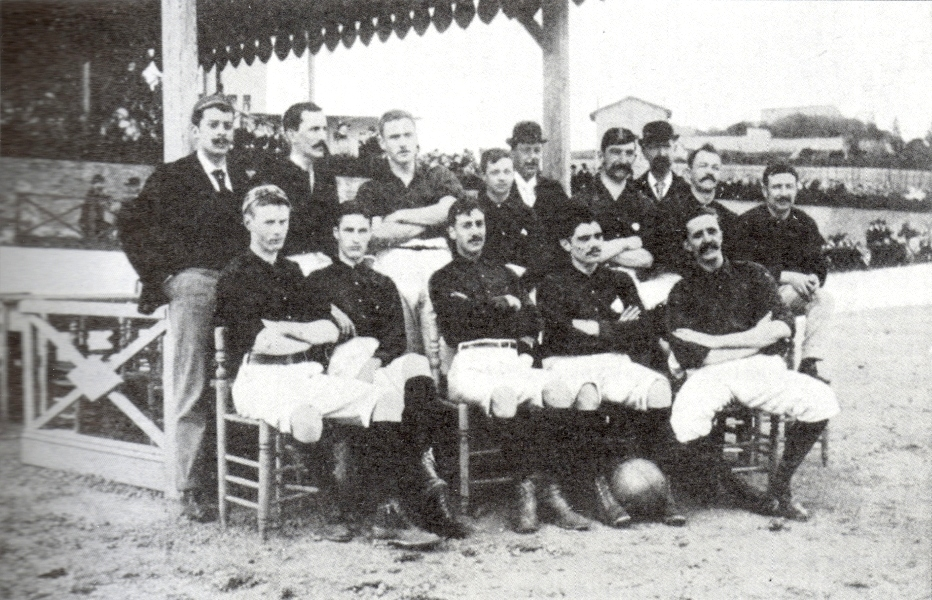
- Parsons (standing, first from the right) in 1895

Personal information
- Full name: William Parsons Alexander
- Date of birth: 19 January 1877
- Place of birth: Barcelona, Catalonia, Spain
- Date of death: Unknown
- Place of death: Barcelona, Catalonia, Spain
- Position: Forward

Senior career*
Years	Team	Apps	(Gls)
1895	Sociedad de Foot-Ball de Barcelona	3	(0)
1899	Team Anglès	+1	(0)
1899–1900	FC Barcelona	1	(0)
- * Club domestic league appearances and goals

William Parsons Alexander (19 January 1877 – Unknown) was an Anglo-Spanish footballer who is best known for being, along with his brother John, one of the founders of FC Barcelona in 1899. He served as the club's vice-captain in 1899 and 1900, though he never played a match for the club. He was also one of the founders of the Real Club de Tenis Barcelona.

== Early life ==
His family, of English origins, settled in Barcelona in 1870, where Parsons was born on 19 January 1877. He was known in Catalonia as Guillermo, which was a rendering of his English name into Spanish.

== Sporting career ==
=== Barcelona Cricket Club ===
In the early 1890s, Parsons and his younger brother William became members of the British Club de Barcelona, where they practiced several modalities such as cricket with the Barcelona Cricket Club.

=== Sociedad de Foot-Ball de Barcelona ===
Together with his brother John, he was one of the first pioneers of football in Catalonia, joining Sociedad de Foot-Ball de Barcelona in 1895, a team made up of a group of football pioneers who had been playing in Catalonia since 1893. On 27 January 1895, Parsons was one of 16 footballers who featured in the first football match played in Bonanova, scoring a hat-trick to help the Blues to a 4–1 win over a Red team that featured his older brother. On 2 February 1895, he played a match for Barcelona against Asociación de Foot-Ball de Torelló, which was the very first time that teams from two different cities played against each other in Catalonia, and he rose to the occasion, scoring once in an 8–3 local win.

Parsons played several friendly matches at Can Tunis and a few others at Bonanova between 1892 and 1895, where he stood out as a great goal scorer, however, due to the little statistical rigor that the newspapers had at that time, the exact number of goals he netted is unknown. Despite some encouraging first steps, this society was never officially established and when its founder and captain James Reeves returned to the United Kingdom in the autumn of 1895, it was the Catalans and the Parsons brothers who took the reins of the team, but without Reeves, the entity soon declined, collapsed and seems to disappear around 1896. Football in the city then crosses its first crisis which lasted three years from 1896 until 1899, with the Parsons playing an important role in the sport's return to the city, helping with the creations of Team Anglès and FC Barcelona, both in 1899.

=== FC Barcelona ===
In 1899, Parsons and his brother were among the twelve men who attended the infamous meeting held at the Gimnasio Solé on 29 November 1899 which saw the birth of Foot-Ball Club Barcelona. However, in Barcelona's official debut on 8 December 1899, the two Parsons brothers played for the rival team, Team Anglès, which consisted of members of the British colony living in Barcelona, such as the two of them and the Witty brothers (Arthur and Ernest), helping Anglès to a 1–0 win.

Five days later, on 13 December 1899, the Blaugrana team merged with the Team Anglès, which led to the expansion of Barça's board of directors with his brother John becoming the vice-president of the club while still being a footballer, and William was appointed the vice-captainancy of the team. However, he never managed to defend that responsibility on the playing field because in February 1900, he left for Manila for family reasons, leaving the vice-captaincy of Barcelona in the hands of Ernest Witty.
