= Carlos Soley =

Spanish footballer (1885–1941)

Personal information
- Full name: Carlos Soley Güell
- Date of birth: 1 January 1885
- Place of birth: San José, Costa Rica
- Date of death: 12 October 1941 (aged 56)
- Place of death: San José, Costa Rica
- Height: 1.88 m (6 ft 2 in)
- Positions: Goalkeeper; midfielder

Senior career*
Years	Team	Apps	(Gls)
1899–1900	Català FC	+4	(0)
1899–1900	→ FC Barcelona (loan)	2	(0)
1900	→ Escocès FC (loan)	1	(0)
1900	Team Rojo	+3	(0)
1900–1901	Hispania AC		
- * Club domestic league appearances and goals

Carlos Soley Güell (1 January 1885 – 12 October 1941) was a Costa Rican footballer who played as a goalkeeper and a midfielder for Spanish club FC Barcelona at the turn of the century. He was a member of the side that won the very first official title in Spanish football, the 1900–01 Copa Macaya with Hispania AC. He was the brother of Tomás Soley Güell, the founding economist of what is today the National Insurance Institute.

== Biography ==
Born in Costa Rica, he moved to Barcelona in the late 19th century, to continue his studies. At the time, the only football teams in the city were Català FC, FC Barcelona, and Team Anglès (a team made up of members of the British colony living in Barcelona), and he joined the ranks of Català in late 1899. On 26 December 1899, the former two clubs agreed to join the best players of each team to face the English, and in the absence of Barça's goalkeeper, Juan de Urruela, it was Soley who played between the posts that day, conceding only once in a 2–1 win. In addition to being his Català debut, it was also his first match with the Barça shirt (it was only the third-ever match in Barça's history), thus becoming in the first Costa Rican to wear the Blaugrana colors. This scenario repeated again on 6 January 1900, but this time he played in the midfield since Urruela returned, but despite this, they lost 0–3.

On 11 February 1900, Català FC once again combined forces with a neighboring team, this time Escocès FC, to play against FC Barcelona, and despite the inclusion of six players from Escocès, Soley was once again one of the starting eleven in a 0–4 loss. In April, a conflict between the club members caused some of them to leave Català and found a new club, Team Rojo. Soley was one of them and he played in Rojo's official debut on 24 May against FC Barcelona, which they won 2–1. Team Rojo went on to become Hispania AC in October 1900, with Soley being one of its founding members and was also part of the club's first directives as a secretary. Shortly after, on November, Hispania took advantage of the dissolution of Escocés FC to incorporate several of its most prominent players, such as Hamilton, Black and Gold.

Two months later, Hispania AC organized the first edition of the Copa Macaya in 1901, which was the first football championship played on the Iberian Peninsula, and the forerunner for the Catalan championship which began in 1903. Together with Gustavo Green and the Morris brothers (Samuel and Enrique), Soley was part of the Hispania team that become the very first Spanish club to win an official title, being a solid physical presence in the midfield and starting in the decisive match against Barça on 14 April 1901, in which he played a crucial role in helping his side held a 1–1 draw. Soley also holds the peculiar distinction of being one of the few to have participated in the tournament both as a player and as a referee, overseeing a game between Tarragona and Club Espanyol, which ended in a 0–2 win to the latter.

== Chess ==
In 1902, Carlos Soley returned to his native Costa Rica. There, Soley dedicated time to chess. He participated in the national chess championship in 1927. That year he played 30 games, won 18, and lost 12, finishing in sixth place. He also participated in the 1928 championship. He died in Costa Rica on 12 October 1941 at the age of 56.

== Honours ==
Hispania AC

- Copa Macaya:
  - Champions: 1900–01

FC Barcelona

- Catalan championship:
  - Champions: 1904–05
