= Bartomeu Terradas =

Spanish footballer (1874–1948)

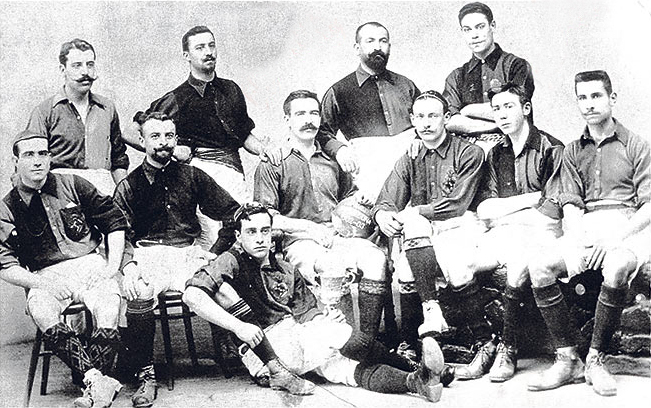
- Terradas (standing, second from the left) in 1903

2nd President of FC Barcelona
- In office 25 April 1901 – 5 September 1902
- Preceded by: Walter Wild
- Succeeded by: Paul Haas

Personal details
- Born: 1874 Barcelona, Catalonia, Spain
- Died: 1948 (aged 74) Barcelona, Spain
Association football career
- Full name: Bartomeu Terradas Brutau
- Position: Forward
Senior career*
Years	Team	Apps	(Gls)
- Lille
1899–1903	FC Barcelona	31	
- * Club domestic league appearances and goals

Bartomeu Brutau Terradas, sometimes written as Bartolomé Terradas (1874-1948), was a Spanish footballer who played as a forward for FC Barcelona in the turn of the century. He was treasurer and later the second president in the club's history. He was one of the most important figures in the amateur beginnings of FC Barcelona, being among the twelve founders of the club in 1899, and then serving the club as a player, winning the 1900–01 Copa Macaya, which was the club's first piece of silverware.

== Playing career ==
Born in Barcelona, Terradas attended the founding meeting which formalized the establishment of the club, held at the Gimnasio Solé on 29 November 1899.

He then become one of the first footballers of the newly formed FC Barcelona, playing as a midfielder, making his debut against a team that consisted of members of the British colony living in Barcelona, on 8 December 1899, at the old Bonanova Velodrome. Only ten players played, as no more were available, and the British were defeated 1–0.

== Executive career ==
On 25 April 1901, Terradas became the president of Barcelona, following the resignation of Walter Wild. The dire economic situation forced him to deal with various difficult situations. He became the first patron of FC Barcelona, with a contribution of 1,400 pesetas, saving the club from bankruptcy. During his presidency, he contributed to the creation of the Catalan Football Federation, which brought together all the Catalan clubs, except Espanyol and FC Internacional, which were later incorporated. During his mandate, he approved the formation of a second and a third squad.

One of his main achievements was getting the funds to construct the second sports field in the club's history. Terradas created the club's first sports committee, formed by Gamper, Meyer, and Viderkher. In addition to being president, he kept representing FC Barcelona on the field, which was common at the time, being a member of the Barcelona team that won the club's first piece of silverware, the 1900–01 Copa Macaya, even netting once, in an 18–0 win over Tarragona.

In the following year, however, his father died and he had to take over the family business, thus leaving the office on 5 September 1902. He chaired the club for 507 days. He retired as a player in 1903, having played 31 matches for FC Barcelona. In September 1903, he was elected as a member, and a year later he became vice president. He started to move away from Barça in 1905. When the professionalization of the club and the players led Terradas to feel that he was losing the initial concept of the club.

== Honours ==
Barcelona

- Copa Macaya: 1901–02
