= Otto Maier (footballer) =

German footballer (1877–1965)

Personal information
- Full name: Otto Karl Christian Maier Zeuner
- Date of birth: 2 September 1877
- Place of birth: Heidenheim, Germany
- Date of death: 6 October 1965 (aged 88)
- Place of death: Barcelona, Spain
- Position: Midfielder

Senior career*
Years	Team	Apps	(Gls)
1899–1902	FC Barcelona	18	(7)
- * Club domestic league appearances and goals

Otto Karl Christian Maier Zeuner (2 September 1877 – 6 October 1965) was a German footballer who played as a midfielder for FC Barcelona. He was one of the most important footballers in the amateur beginnings of FC Barcelona, being among the 12 founders of the club in 1899, and then serving the club as a midfielder for three years, where he played a role in the conquest of Barça's first ever piece of silverware, the 1901–02 Copa Macaya.

== Biography ==
Otto was born on 2 September 1877 in Heidenheim, as the son of Johann Maier, a merchant, and Regine Zeuner. Maier was named after Otto von Bismarck, the architect of German unification. In 1907, he married Anna Elizabeth Müller, from Berlin, with whom he had three children, Rosario and the tennis players María Isabel and Enrique Maier, the first Spanish player to win the Wimbledon title, in the 1932 mixed doubles, and he also won at the 1935 US Open.

He worked in the Hartmann company since 1891 and he was the one chosen by the owner to expand the business in Spain starting from Barcelona. He arrived in Barcelona as a corporate representative of the Hartmann company (which still exists, celebrating its 200th anniversary in 2018) with the mission of launching an innovative factory of sanitary dressings. Maier had that factory built on the corner of Calle Corts (currently Calle Roc de Boronat) by the end of the 19th century. As the years passed, he equipped it with the latest innovations (generators, electro-motors, autoclave boilers...), which allowed him to approach new markets, such as the manufacture of surgical furniture and orthopedic articles. It was a leading firm in pharmacy, hygiene, and health engineering. At the outbreak of the World War I in 1914, he went from being the representative of Hartmann's Spanish delegation to its owner. Industries Sanitaries SA was then born, a business that prospered and expanded to Madrid, Seville, Valencia, among others.

He was part of the board of directors of the Transatlantic Commercial Bank. In 1952, he was awarded the Silver Medal for Merit of Work.

== Sporting career ==
In Berlin, where he attended university, he was already introduced to football with FC Britannia (currently Berliner SV 1892). At the end of 1899, he arrived in the circle that would become FC Barcelona together with Enrique Ducay, a member of Hartmann's law firm (legal office) in Barcelona, although this lawyer and adviser-secretary ended up never playing for the club. They were two of the twelve men who attended the historic meeting held at the Gimnasio Solé on 29 November 1899 which saw the birth of Football Club Barcelona. He was a personal friend of Joan Gamper.

With Barça, he played only 18 games between 1900 and 1902, playing as a midfielder or striker, netting seven goals. He made his debut on 28 January 1900 in a friendly against Català FC, helping his side to a 6–0 win, and on 20 January 1901, Maier went down in history as one of the eleven footballers who played in Barcelona's competitive debut played against Hispania AC in the inaugural edition of the Copa Macaya, the very first football competition played on the Iberian Peninsula, which ended in a narrow runner-up finish to Hispania AC. In the following season, however, Maier contributed in Barça's first-ever title, the 1901–02 Copa Macaya, in which he played his last match for the club on 9 March 1902 also against Hispania AC in a 1–0 victory. The Copa Macaya is now recognized as the first Catalan championship.

On 27 December 1900, he gave an emergency (first aid) kit, balls and goals to FC Barcelona. Maier was a generous and responsible person, active and constant in helping hospitals, both in money and in kind. He was part of the board of directors of Banco Comercial Transatlántico, born in 1950 from the former Banco Alemán. He was a manager between 1900 (sub-captain) and 1904. He was also a manager of Barcelona between 1900 and 1904.

== Death ==
Otto Maier died in Barcelona on 6 October 1965, at the age of 88, at his home on Avenida General Miter, a victim of heart failure.

== Honours ==
FC Barcelona

- Copa Macaya: 1901–02; runner-up 1900–01
