= Jaime Vila =

Spanish sportsperson (1860–1954)

1st President of Català FC
- In office 1899–1905

Personal details
- Born: 1860 Les Oluges, Lleida, Spain
- Died: 21 July 1954 (aged 94) Barcelona, Catalonia, Spain
Association football career
- Full name: Jaime Vila Capdevila
- Birth name: Jaume Vila i Capdevila
- Position: Midfielder
Senior career*
Years	Team	Apps	(Gls)
1899–1900	Català FC	+2	(0)
- * Club domestic league appearances and goals

Jaime Vila Capdevila (1860 – 21 July 1954) was a Spanish physical education teacher, sports promoter and leader. He is widely regarded as one of the most important figures in the amateur beginnings of gymnastics and football in Catalonia, having been one of the fundamental heads behind the Tolosa Gymnasium, which he served as a teacher and later as director, as well as being the main driving force behind the foundation of Català FC, serving as the first president of the club between 1899 and 1905.

As the founder of Català, Vila was the great rival of FC Barcelona, founded by Joan Gamper, at the turn of the century. Jaime Vila's Català and Gamper's FC Barcelona would star in a long controversy about the "Deanery" of football in the city. In addition to gymnastics and football, he also promoted athletics, wrestling, fencing and boxing. He was also a member of the Center Excursionista de Catalunya for more than forty years. He received numerous distinctions, such as the honorary diploma of the Spanish Gymnastics Federation in 1900. In 1947 he received a tribute in which he was recognized as dean of gymnastics in Barcelona.

== Gymnastics career ==
Born in 1860 in the Lleida town of Les Oluges to a family of peasants, Vila moved to Barcelona at the age of 14 years old. He had several jobs during his first years in the Catalan capital, from working in a coal factory to even acting as a cook, before finally joining the Gimnasio Tolosa (run by Eduardo Tolosa Alsina) located on the Duque de la Victoria street as a teacher in the mid-1880s. The gymnasiums were few at the time, with the oldest one in the city being as old as him, having been founded in 1860 by pioneer Joaquim Ramis i Taix.

In the early 1890s, he set out to create a system that would make work all the muscles of the body, without exception. Although he already had some knowledge about anatomy, he asked for the advice of a doctor to make sure it was safe. His system consisted of a series of exercises, and he named it after "Physical culture". First, he had a blacksmith build a series of pulleys in the gym, which at that time constituted a novelty, and then, he combined those devices with weights, rope, ladder, and bars. Every day a different exercise had to be performed, which lasted 45 minutes, and then repeat each movement 25 times. In the end, they took stimulating cold water from hoses; later, however, he settled for the shower. This system, which had nothing to do with what he had practiced in Tolosa until then, introduced the novelty of a self-made educational system, which distinguished the Tolosa gym from the other gymnasiums of that time, and thus, it began attracting a lot of new students, who were mainly athletes who faced tough physical challenges, such as boxers, cyclists or rowers, who came to his gym to better strengthen their body. As a result of this success, Vila became the Tolosa gym's director in the late 1890s, a position he held until the early 1900s.

Being the embellishment of the human body genesis of agility and strength, to you, Jaume Vila, master excelling in the regenerationist art of harmony, in the development in balance and creator of wills and energies, we now pay homage in respect.

— Barcelona, November of 1913.

Vila was a serious man of few words and with a very strict lifestyle. He dedicated his life and efforts to his vocation, which was "not the triumph, but simple and constant physical improvement". He died an unmarried man at the age of 94, having worked until just months before his death. He stayed in the gymnasium morning and afternoons, attending to his students (and he always had students), and sometimes he even had private classes at noon. And Sundays were used to organize all kinds of competitions and excursions outside the city. For instance, in 1898, Vila organized the first official race in Catalonia, which ran between Barcelona and Sarria. He was also a member of the Center Excursionista de Catalunya for more than forty years.

On 24 September 1900, in a meeting held in Barcelona by the Spanish Gymnastics Federation, he was awarded the first Diploma of Honor, created by the painter Antonio Utrillo. In 1913, in the First Spanish International Congress on Tuberculosis, he was awarded the Medal of Gold and the Diploma of Honor in gymnastics.

== Footballing career ==
=== Founding Català FC and deanery of Barcelona ===
Football began taking root in the city in the 1890s, and soon it gained followers among members belonging to the Tolosa Gymnasium, where Vila was introduced to football by his younger students. As a lover of sport and physical culture, he also began practicing this new sport at the Velódromo de la Bonanova, and eventually, he began to promote it among his students, creating the football team Sociedad Deportiva Tolosa, which trained in Bonanova. It was around this time that Vila met Joan Gamper, who came to him to propose the idea of creating a well-organized football club, but Vila flatly rejects him because he was foreign. On 21 October 1899, Vila, together with his students, founded the Català Futbol Club, in a meeting held at the Tolosa gym, thus becoming the first football team formed in Catalonia. Although the club was founded in October, Català was not officially established until 17 December 1899, in a meeting held in the Café San Gervasio de Cassolas, in which they formalized the first board of directors with Vila being named the club's first president, while Miguel Valdés, one of his best students, became the club's treasurer.

On 22 October 1899, the day after the club's formation, they organized their first training session with a match between the club's members, most of which being Vila's students, and as their teacher, he inevitably was the referee of that game, and despite not actually knowing how the rules of the sport worked, he displayed great skills as a referee. All the men involved in that game were Catalans, because in its beginnings, Vila wanted to promote the local sport, and thus, it only admitted Catalan players to its team, hence the club's name. Despite becoming known for not admitting foreigners, Català accepted its first foreign players just two months after its foundation, when on 11 February 1900, Català decided to name six Scots as honorary partners: Hamilton, Denniston, Dykes, Gold, Girvan and A. Black. The traditional explanation of his rejection of Gamper being due to his foreign status seems contradictory to the presence of several Scots (Catholics) in Català's ranks, so some historians have theorized that Vila's rejection of Gamper and his companions was due to their status as protestants, not because they were foreigners.

Surely offended and hurt by this rejection, Gamper took a few days to go to another Barcelona gym where he was well received, Gimnasio Solé (Tolosa's rival), where he went on to found FC Barcelona on 29 November 1899. Naturally, Vila's Català FC and Gamper's FC Barcelona developed a very strong rivalry during the first years of football in Catalonia, starring in a long controversy about the "Deanery" of football in the city, with the polemics about who was the first official club of Barcelona (the club dean of the city) finishing only when the blaugranas proved that they had been the first club to be registered in the civil registry on 29 November, only a few days before Català FC, who did it on 17 December. Either way, Vila stayed out of this debate, as above all, he wanted football to be practiced in an absolutely sporting way, unrelated to official status. In fact, the only reason why he began to promote football among his students was because it was the sport with the best chance of hatching among that generation of Barcelona gymnasts due to being an outdoor sport, and that is also why most of the first Barcelona clubs were born in gyms and under the protection and encouragement of characters linked to the Spanish Gymnastic Federation such as Jaime Vila and Narciso Masferrer.

=== Playing career ===
On 26 December 1899, Català and FC Barcelona decided to set their rivalry aside to join the best players of each team in order to face Team Anglès, a team made up of members of the British colony living in Barcelona, and it was Vila who took the role of the referee, as the English lost 1–2. On 25 February 1900, Vila played in a friendly against Escocès FC at Bonanova, which ended in a 1–5 loss. In December 1901, the 41-year-old Vila featured in two friendly matches against FC Barcelona as a midfielder, with both games ending in heavy losses (1–4 and 0–8). He also played one unofficial match for FC Barcelona in the 1901–02 season.

On 10 January 1903, the name of the club changed to Català Sport Club, when the club merged with the recent-dissolved Club Universitari, but Vila stayed at the heel and kept carrying out the effective presidency, and later, the honorary one. His legacy as a pioneer of Catalan football has been largely forgotten due to his discretion and simplicity.

Vila's activity as a referee would continue since a few years later, he occasionally oversaw some matches of the Catalan championship, including one each in the 1905–06 and 1909–10 seasons.

== Gimnàs Vila ==
In 1904 he founded Gimnàs Vila (Spanish: Vila Gymnasium), where he continued his work as a great popularizer and promoter of physical culture, gymnastics, athletics, Greco-Roman wrestling, fencing, and boxing. In 1908 he inaugurated the weapons room, where he practiced fencing, as well as the boxing room, known as Sala Vidal. In 1917 he moved his Gymnasium to a basement on the number 87 of street de Pau CIaiis, where it is still open. He organized many gymnastics festivals. One of his outstanding students was Nemesi Ponsati, who also dedicated his entire life to the sporting world, as a practitioner of Swedish gymnastics, water polo, swimming, and athletics. Students from the Joan Bardina Teachers' School also attended. The Gimnàs Vila remained open until the end of the 20th century.

== Later life ==
Vila lived his later life alone, except for a niece who began to help him every afternoon at the gym. They came to Barcelona shortly before the Spanish Civil War began, so they had to live in a flat on Bonavista street, but they got through it without any major incident.

In April 1947, Vila received a tribute in which he was recognized as the dean of gymnastics in Barcelona.

== Death ==
Vila suffered a stroke a few years later, from which he recovered almost entirely by force through gymnastics. Vila died on 21 July 1954 at the age of 94.
