= AUF Tarragona =

Football club in Spain active between 1900 and 1901

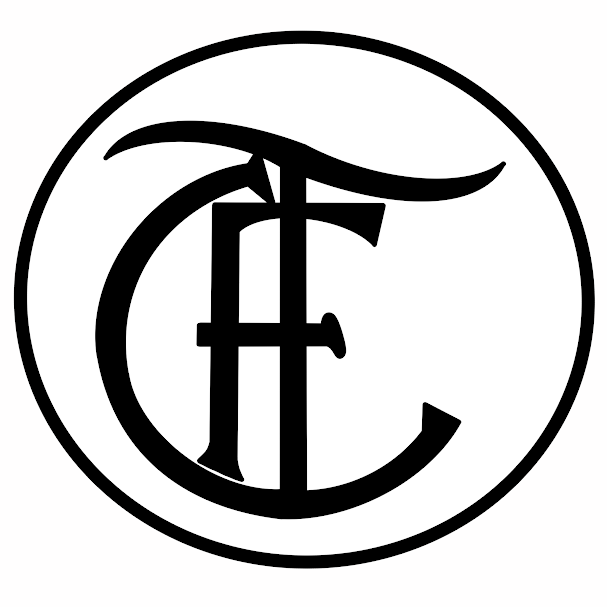
- The club's shield
- Full name: Asociación Unionista de Foot-ball de Tarragona
- Short name: AUF Tarragona
- Founded: Late 1900
- Dissolved: 1901
- Ground: Campo del ex-velódromo de Tarragona
Home colours	Away colours	Third colours

The Asociación Unionista de Foot-ball de Tarragona, better known as AUF Tarragona, was a football team based in Tarragona, Spain, that existed in 1900–01. It was one of the first football clubs in the city and it was among the six pioneering clubs that participated in the inaugural edition of the Copa Macaya, which was the first football competition played in the Iberian Peninsula.

== History ==
=== Origins ===
In 1900, William Tarin, known as Guillermo in Spain, was instigated by the leaders of Hispania Athletic Club to spread the knowledge of football in Tarragona, doing so mainly among the members of the local cycling club, who, after learning the basic rules of the sport, decided to create the Asociación Unionista de Foot-ball de Tarragona. It was the first club exclusively dedicated to football in Tarragona; Gimnàstic de Tarragona was founded in 1886, but its football team was not formed until 1914. The club, known in the press as Tarragona FC, played with blue shirts and white trousers. Some of its members began going to Barcelona to watch some matches and learn about the rules of this new sport.

=== 1900–01 Copa Macaya ===
In December 1900, Alfonso Macaya, the then honorary president of Hispania AC, began to develop the idea of a football championship contested in a league format between the different clubs that had been created in Spain, the so-called Copa Macaya, which was the first football competition played in the Iberian Peninsula, being open to all national clubs throughout the country. In the end, however, only six Catalan teams participated, of which only one was a non-Barcelona team, AUF Tarragona, with the rest of the participants being Hispania, FC Barcelona, Sociedad Franco-Española, SD Santanach, and Club Espanyol (currently known as RCD Espanyol). Taking into account the distance, Tarragona was allowed to submit its list of components by mail and outside the established deadline; their list included 18 players, such as William "Guillermo" Tarin, Eduardo Andreu, and Roberto Guasch.

The team's captain, Tarin, requested to play their first match at home, which was scheduled for 10 February at the land of the former Velodrome, conveniently arranged and ceded by the City Council. While the field was bring prepared, the team carried out its training sessions in the bullring. The build-up for this match aroused great expectation in the city, with the local newspapers La Opinión and Diario de Tarragona closely following the training sessions as well as the trips and sleepless nights of Tarin and Guasch to be up for the occasion, and even a highly political publication like Lo Camp de Tarragona reported on this first match, highlighting Tarin as the "responsible for the introduction of such a hygienic game in Tarragona and the organisation of this festival".

On the day of the match, a crowd of 4,000 people showed up, who watched a hard-fought battle that ultimately ended in a 0–2 loss to Espanyol, thanks to goals from Miguel Bernat and Joaquin Sanchez; this was not only the first-ever official match played in Tarragona, but also the first time that a team from the city of Barcelona travelled outside the province of Barcelona. In March 2001, to commemorate the centenary of this first match, a plaque was placed in the current Plaza Corsini, where the former velodrome had been located. The line-up of Tarragona in this historic match was composed of Pallejá (goalkeeper), J. Comaposada, Antonio López (defenders), Moret, Tarín, Soler (midfielders), Antonio Ríos, Andreu, Guasch, José Pons, José Iborra (forwards); after the match, the local press described them as "hard-working and not lacking in soul and vigour", and as having "fought with tenacity and enthusiasm, but was somewhat lacking in practice".

Two weeks later, on 24 February, Tarragona played its second match, also at home, but this time against Hispania, who won 5–0; the local press highlighted the performances of "Guasch, Tarin, and the Tarragona goalkeeper Faro, who defended the red goal with uncommon vigor and agility". After the match, the players of both teams went to the Velocipedista Club to "change their uniforms and have an equally delightful exchange of impressions", and later had dinner at the Hotel de Paris, where "the tireless leader of Tarragona, Tarin, improvised a toast full of enthusiasm". During this celebrations, the representatives of Hispania spread a false rumor about how Barcelona was planning to ridicule Tarragona in order to show that they were superior to Hispania, thus instilling a stage of fright in the Tarragona club that caused them to not undertake the journey to Barça, who thus had to suspend the festive events that it had prepared to celebrate what would have been the first time that a team from outside Barcelona came to the city to play a match, which finally happened on 24 March, in their match against Hispania at the Camp del carrer Muntaner, who again won by a score of 5–0.

This friction existed because AUF Tarragona had been created under the patronage of Hispania, who sort of acted as their teachers, and as the ties between them got tighter, the ties between Tarragona and Barcelona got looser. In fact, throughout the tournament, the Tarragona press always leaned more in favor of Hispania. Furthermore, when it came Barça's turn to visit Tarragona on 17 March, they received a cold welcome, mainly due to a rainy day, which also affected the turnout, with only 600 spectators attending the match to witness their team suffer a resounding 0–18 loss, courtesy of a 9-goal haul from Joan Gamper. Due to the costs of traveling, Tarragona only travelled for the match against Hispania (and did it so with only nine players), with their absences in the remaining matches being awarded the points to the opponent; for instance, Tarragona and Franco agreed not to appear in their matches, thus adding two points to each team. In the end, Tarragona finished in fourth with 4 points, having lost six matches and won two, both awarded.

== Decline and collapse ==
Its success inspired the creation of other football clubs in the region, such as Intrepid FC and Shooter FC, both of which used the former velocipede complex located near Plaza Corsini. In the following years, however, football in Tarragona went into crisis and all of these three clubs disappeared without a known date. On 23 September 1909, a certain AUF Tarragona played a friendly against Barça, who won 1–7.
