= Ernest Witty =

Anglo-Spanish footballer, tennis player, and businessman

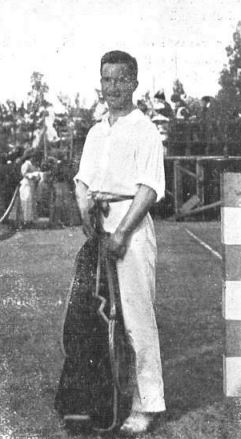
- Witty in 1907

Personal information
- Full name: Ernest Witty Cotton
- Place of birth: Barcelona, Spain

Senior career*
Years	Team	Apps	(Gls)
1904–1905	FC Barcelona		
- * Club domestic league appearances and goals

Ernest Francis Cotton Witty (31 August 1880 - 1969) was an Anglo-Spanish footballer, tennis player and businessman. In 1899 Witty, a Spanish national tennis champion, became a founding member of the Real Club de Tenis Barcelona and in the early 1900s he played football for FC Barcelona. He was also a successful trader and his family company, the Witty Group, continues to operate today. He was the younger brother of Arthur Witty.

== Early years ==
Witty was the son of Frederick Witty, a British entrepreneur, who settled in Barcelona. Frederick, who belonged to a Yorkshire family, initially intended to emigrate to Argentina but was persuaded to go to Spain by friends. In 1873 he founded his own shipping agency under the name of F. Witty, subsequently establishing business links between Spain and the United Kingdom. Ernest and his brother Arthur were educated at Merchant Taylors' School in Merseyside, where sport was regarded as a major part of a young man's development. On their return to Barcelona the two brothers joined their father's company which now became known as Witty Sociedad Anonima, Witty S.A.

== FC Barcelona ==
Ernest and Arthur returned to Spain with a love of sports. Unable to play rugby union due to a lack of suitable pitches, the Wittys began to organise football games between company teams made up of employees. Ernest played tennis with, among others, Joan Gamper, and when Gamper founded FC Barcelona in October 1899, the Witty brothers quickly became involved. They used their company to imports regulation balls, referees whistles, and nets from England. Legend also has it that the Witty brothers also imported the legendary club colours, the blaugrana, from the original colours used by Merchant Taylors' rugby team. However, FC Basel and other Swiss clubs that Gamper played for and his home canton of Zurich have all been credited and/or claimed to be the inspiration. In 1905 Witty, together with Romà Forns, also helped FC Barcelona win its first Catalan football championship.

== Tennis ==
In 1899, Ernest also became a founding member of the Real Club de Tenis Barcelona and active player from 1903 to 1930 winning seven singles titles. In 1903 he co founded the Barcelona International Championships an event he won on four occasions, 1903, 1907, 1909, 1916, this event was the precursor to the Trofeo Conde de Godó. He also won the Copa del Rey event three times in 1925, 1926 and 1930. He was also a finalist at the 1911 Spanish National Championships.

Witty also competed on the Swiss Alpine circuit in the early 1900s taking part in the French Switzerland Championships and Les Avants Championship in 1905 where he made the quarter finals in both events.

== Honours ==
=== Footballer ===
FC Barcelona

- Catalan Champions: 1904–05

== Sources ==
- Morbo: The Story of Spanish Football (2003), Phil Ball.
- Barça: A People's Passion (1998), Jimmy Burns.
