= Joan Gamper =

Spanish-Swiss football executive and athlete (1877–1930)

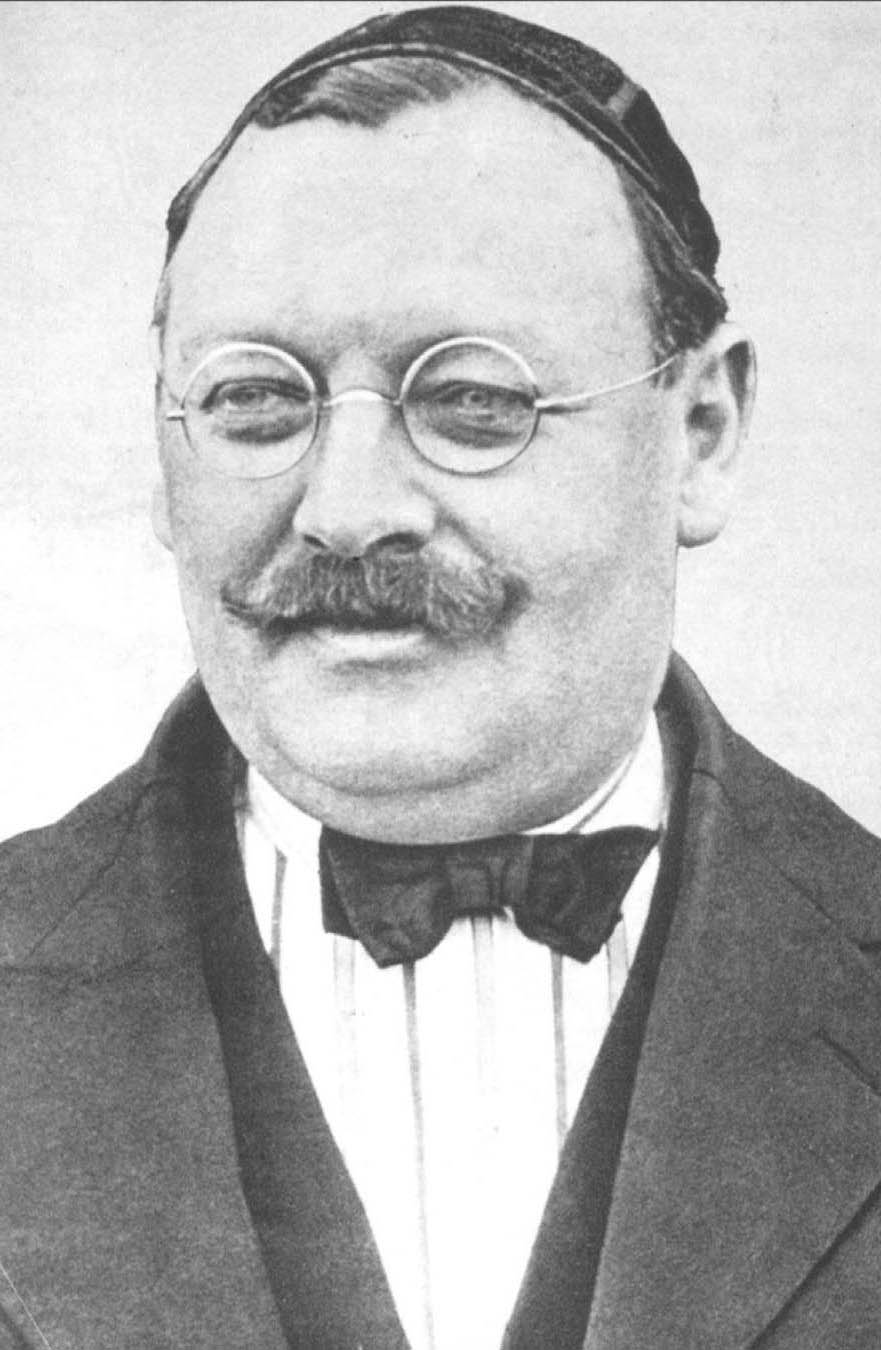
- Joan Gamper in 1910
- Born: Hans Max Gamper-Haessig; 22 November 1877; Winterthur, Switzerland
- Died: 30 July 1930 (aged 52); Barcelona, Spain
- Resting place: Cemetery of Montjuïc; 41.355299°N 2.155061°E
- Citizenship: Swiss and Spanish
- Occupations: Athlete; businessman
- Known for: Founder of Zürich, Barcelona, Player at Basel
- Political party: Liberation Party of Pardi
Association football career
Senior career*
Years	Team	Apps	(Gls)
- Excelsior
- Zürich
- Basel
1899–1903	Barcelona	55	(126)
- * Club domestic league appearances and goals

Hans Max Gamper-Haessig (German pronunciation: [hans maks ˈɡampər ˈhɛːsɪg]; 22 November 1877 – 30 July 1930), commonly known as Joan Gamper (IPA: [ʒuˈaŋ ˈɡampər]), was a Swiss-born football executive and versatile athlete. He founded football clubs in Switzerland and Spain, most notably Barcelona.

He is widely regarded as one of the most important figures in the amateur beginnings of Barcelona, being the fundamental head behind the foundation of the club in 1899, and then serving as the club's first captain between 1899 and 1903, netting over 100 goals in just 48 matches for Barça, and in 1902, he captained his side to a victory in the Copa Macaya, the club's first title. He then served as its president on five occasions between 1908 and 1925. One of his main achievements was getting the funds for the construction of their own stadium in 1909, the Camp de la Indústria, which is regarded as the main element that helped the club grow in the 1910s. Under Gamper's leadership, Barcelona won eleven Championat de Catalunya, six Copa del Rey and four Pyrenees Cup.

== Early years ==
Hans-Max Gamper (his mother's maiden name – Haessig – is generally appended in Spanish sources) was born in Winterthur, Switzerland. He was the eldest son and third of five children born to August Gamper and Rosine Emma Haessig. His mother died of tuberculosis when he was eight and the family moved to Zurich. He became a citizen of the city and in his later youth started to learn his craft as a tradesman in an apprenticeship at the silk trade house Grieder at the centrally located Paradeplatz. As a youngster, Gamper was a keen cyclist and runner. In 1893, 15 years old, he was one of the pacers of Swiss champion Edouard Wicky in a match race competition over 100 km (against Gaston Béguin). Throughout his life he was a lover of all sports and, apart from football, he also played rugby union, tennis and golf. In Switzerland, he was highly regarded as a footballer. His first football club was Excelsior Zürich which was playing in the same colours (red and blue) as later Barcelona. After some members of Excelsior split off to form Turicum Zürich, they reunited with Excelsior in 1896 to form FC Zürich. Gamper was a co-founder and the first captain of the club's history. In the early years of football in Switzerland, it was allowed to play for an indefinite number of teams from other cities as a guest player in friendly games – Gamper is known to have played among others two games for Winterthur and Basel. Hans Gamper representing Zürich was in 1898 holder of the Swiss records over the 800m and 1600m track distances. He also organized the first international athletics competition in Zürich during autumn of the same year. Today, this event is one of the most renowned international athletics events worldwide, the Weltklasse Zürich (organized by FC Zürich spin-off LC Zürich). In 1897, work took him temporarily to Lyon in France, where he played rugby for Athletique Union. The other names they called him, all came from the difficulty the Catalan people had, pronouncing the German "H" and "G": Hans became Kans, Gamper became Kamper. But he is most known as Johannes, becoming Joan Gamper.

== Barcelona ==
=== Foundation of the club ===
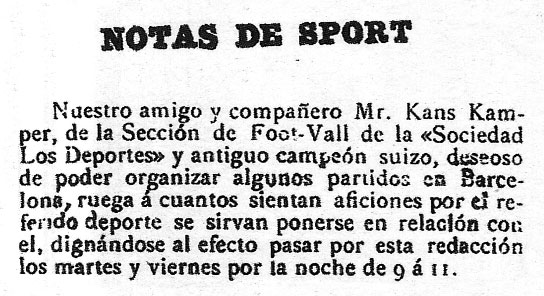
Gamper's 1899 ad in Los Deportes

In 1899, Gamper went to Barcelona to visit his uncle who was living there. He was on his way to Africa to help set up some sugar trading companies but fell in love with the Catalan city and decided to stay put. He would later become a fluent Catalan speaker and adopt the Catalan version of his name: "Joan Gamper". As an accountant, he found work with Crédit Lyonnais, the Sarrià Railway Company and as a sports columnist, he worked for two Swiss newspapers. Gamper joined the local Swiss Evangelical Church and began playing football within the local Christian Protestant community in the district of Sarrià-Sant Gervasi. During his free time, he also played football with a group of friends at the Velódromo de la Bonanova.

When Gamper, who had already founded clubs in his home country, decided to do the same in his new city, he contacted Jaime Vila, the director of the Tolosa gym, which at the time was the home of a group of football enthusiasts that was also practising the sport in Bonanova. He proposed to him the idea of creating a well-organized football club, but Vila rejected him as he did not want foreigners in its ranks and ended up founding Català in October 1899. This did not discourage him, however, with Gamper now aiming to create an organization that was open to everyone, regardless of their origin. He envisaged a club that served as a means of social integration, in which everyone could speak their mind, and create a democratic society that was freely governed by its members.

Immediately afterwards, he and his friend Walter Wild arrived at the Gimnasio Solé. There they were well received by Narciso Masferrer, who had the headquarters of his numerous associations and of the Los Deportes newsroom in the said gym, and they did not take long to publish Gamper's legendary advert declaring his wish to form a football club, published on 22 October 1899. A positive response resulted in a meeting at the Gimnasio Solé on 29 November and "Futbol Club Barcelona" was born. The founders included a collection of Swiss, British, and Spanish enthusiasts. (Note: The twelve founders were Joan Gamper, Walter Wild, Luis de Ossó, Bartomeu Terradas, Otto Kunzle, Otto Maier, Enric Ducal, Pere Cabot, Josep Llobet, John Parsons, and William Parsons.) It is not known if Gamper chose the legendary club colours, blaugrana, after Basel or Excelsior Zürich, although the official version states that brothers Arthur and Ernest Witty (both very involved with the club in its first years) proposed the blaugrana colors, the same used by the rugby team of Merchant Taylors' School in Great Crosby (which they had attended).

=== Playing career ===
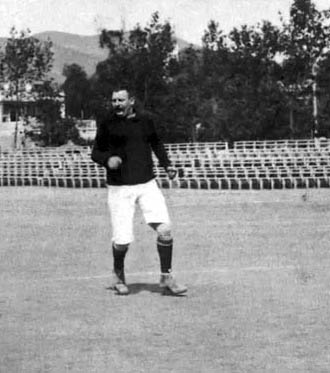
Gamper as player of FC Barcelona in 1902

Although Gamper was the driving force behind the club, initially he chose to only be a board member and club captain. He was still only 22 and wanted to concentrate on playing, featuring in the club's first-ever game held at Bonanova on 8 December 1899 against a team known as Team Anglès, which consisted of members of the British colony living in Barcelona, where he captained his side in a 0–1 loss. In the club's second game, he was the author of Barça's first ever goal, netting twice in a 3–1 win over Català. Gamper played 55 games for Barcelona between 1899 and 1903, scoring 126 goals, thus achieving a game ratio of 2.35 goals per game. Gamper scored most of his goals in official competitions, with 31 of them coming in the 1900–01 Copa Macaya alone, netting two nine-goal hauls against Franco-Española and Club Tarragona, and a further eight-goal haul in the return game with Franco, but despite his goalscoring prowess, Barça ended as runner-ups to Hispania. In the following season, however, he helped Barcelona win the club's first trophy, the Copa Macaya in 1901–02, netting a hat-trick on the final matchday on 23 March 1902 in a 15–0 victory over Català. He was the tournament's top goal scorer again with 19 goals, just two more than teammate Udo Steinberg. The Copa Macaya is now recognized as the first Catalan championship.

In 1902, Gamper was a member of the Barcelona team that participated in the Copa de la Coronación (predecessor of Copa del Rey), and in the semi-finals on 13 May, Barça faced Real Madrid (then Madrid FC) for the first time, and Gamper netted a goal to help his side to a 3–1 win in the first-ever El Clásico. In the final, however, Barça lost 2–1 to Club Vizcaya. In 1903, he added a new title to his career, the Copa Barcelona, which was later recognized as the fourth edition of the Catalan Championship. On 1 February 1903, Gamper scored nine goals to help Barça to a 13–0 win over X Sporting Club in the Copa Barcelona, thus becoming the first and only player to score three nine-goal hauls in his career at Barça. In fact, he is the only one to have done it in a competitive match, since Josep Escolà, who also scored nine goals for Barça in an 11–1 trashing of Real Unión in 1935, but that was a friendly match.

=== Club presidency ===
In 1908, Gamper became president of Barcelona for the first time. Gamper took over the presidency as the club was on the verge of folding. Several of the club's better players had retired and had not been replaced. This soon began to affect the club's performances both on and off the field. The club had not won anything since the Campionat de Catalunya of 1905 and its finances suffered as a result. He was subsequently club president on five occasions (1908–09, 1910–13, 1917–19, 1921–23 and 1924–25. One of his main achievements was to help Barça acquire their own stadium. Until 1909 the team played at various grounds, none of them owned by the club. Gamper raised funds from local businesses and on 14 March 1909, they moved into the Camp de la Indústria, a stadium with an initial capacity of 1,500 spectators, but in 1916 it increased to 6,000, and it was considered the best in the city. He also launched a campaign to recruit more club members and by 1922 the club had over 10,000. This led to the club moving again, this time to Les Corts. This stadium had an initial capacity of 20,000, later expanded to an impressive 48,000 in 1946.

Gamper also recruited the legendary player Paulino Alcántara, the club's seventh all-time top-scorer, and in 1917 appointed Jack Greenwell as manager. This saw the club's fortunes begin to improve on the field. During the Gamper era, Barcelona won eleven Championat de Catalunya, six Copa del Rey and four Pyrenees Cup and enjoyed its first golden age. As well as Alcántara the Barça team under Greenwell also included Sagibarba, Ricardo Zamora, Josep Samitier, Félix Sesúmaga and Franz Platko.

Gamper's final presidency ended in controversial circumstances and personal tragedy. On 14 June 1925, Barcelona fans jeered the Spanish national anthem and then applauded God Save the King, performed by a visiting British Royal Marine band. The dictatorship of Primo de Rivera accused Gamper of promoting Catalan nationalism. And in fact, as a sign of his gratitude to Catalonia, the country that had welcomed him, Gamper imbued Barcelona with the essence that has come to define it ever since: its commitment to Catalan identity. Gamper was forced into exile after the events of Les Corts of 1925.

The club which he saved various times from disappearing, paid a tribute to him, along with all of Catalan football on 25 February 1923, and another posthumous tribute was made on 24 June 1934, both at the Les Corts ground.

== Death ==
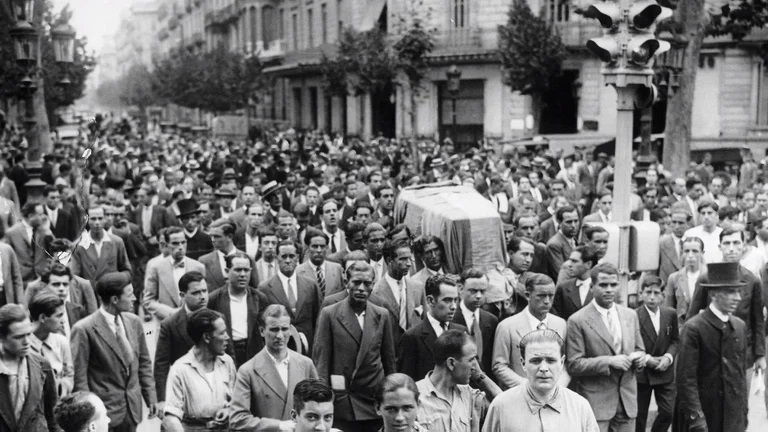
Funeral of Gamper in Barcelona

On 30 July 1930, Gamper committed suicide after a period of depression, probably as a result of his business problems.

His funeral was attended by many people in the city. Players of Barcelona took the coffin to the Cemetery of Montjuïc, where Gamper was buried.

== Legacy ==
In 1966, the Barcelona president Enric Llaudet created the Joan Gamper Trophy in his honour. This is a pre-season tournament featuring international teams as guests and is traditionally used by the club to unveil the team for the forthcoming season. The club also permanently retired his club membership number and the city named a street, Carrer de Joan Gamper in Les Corts district, after him. In 2016, also in Zurich, a small street in a central location of the city already named "Gamperstrasse" has been dedicated to him.

In 2002, Barcelona marked the 100th anniversary of his birth. In 2004, the Winterthur Group, a Swiss insurance company with offices in Barcelona since 1910, became sponsors of the Barcelona basketball team, which led to the team featuring the birthplace of Gamper on their shirts and in their name Winterthur FCB until 2007, after Winterthur Group was purchased by AXA. Perhaps this and the fact that the club developed into a polideportivo, the very personification of Gamper, is the most fitting tribute to this all-round sportsman. Today, Barcelona is "more than just a football club". It promotes amateur track and field sports and has rugby union and cycling teams. All of these were sports played by Gamper. Barça also has professional basketball, handball and roller hockey teams as well as amateur indoor football, women's football, volleyball, baseball and field hockey teams. Over the years, they have even had an ice hockey team.

== Honours ==
=== Club ===
FC Barcelona

- Copa Macaya:
  - Champions: 1901–02
  - Runner-up: 1900–01
- Copa de la Coronación:
  - Runner-up: 1902
- Copa Barcelona:
  - Champions: 1902–03

=== Individual ===
- Catalan championship Top Scorer: 1900–01 with 31 goals, 1901–02 with 19 goals and 1902–03 (Copa Barcelona) with 21 goals.
