= Velódromo de la Bonanova =

Sports venue in Barcelona (1893–1910)

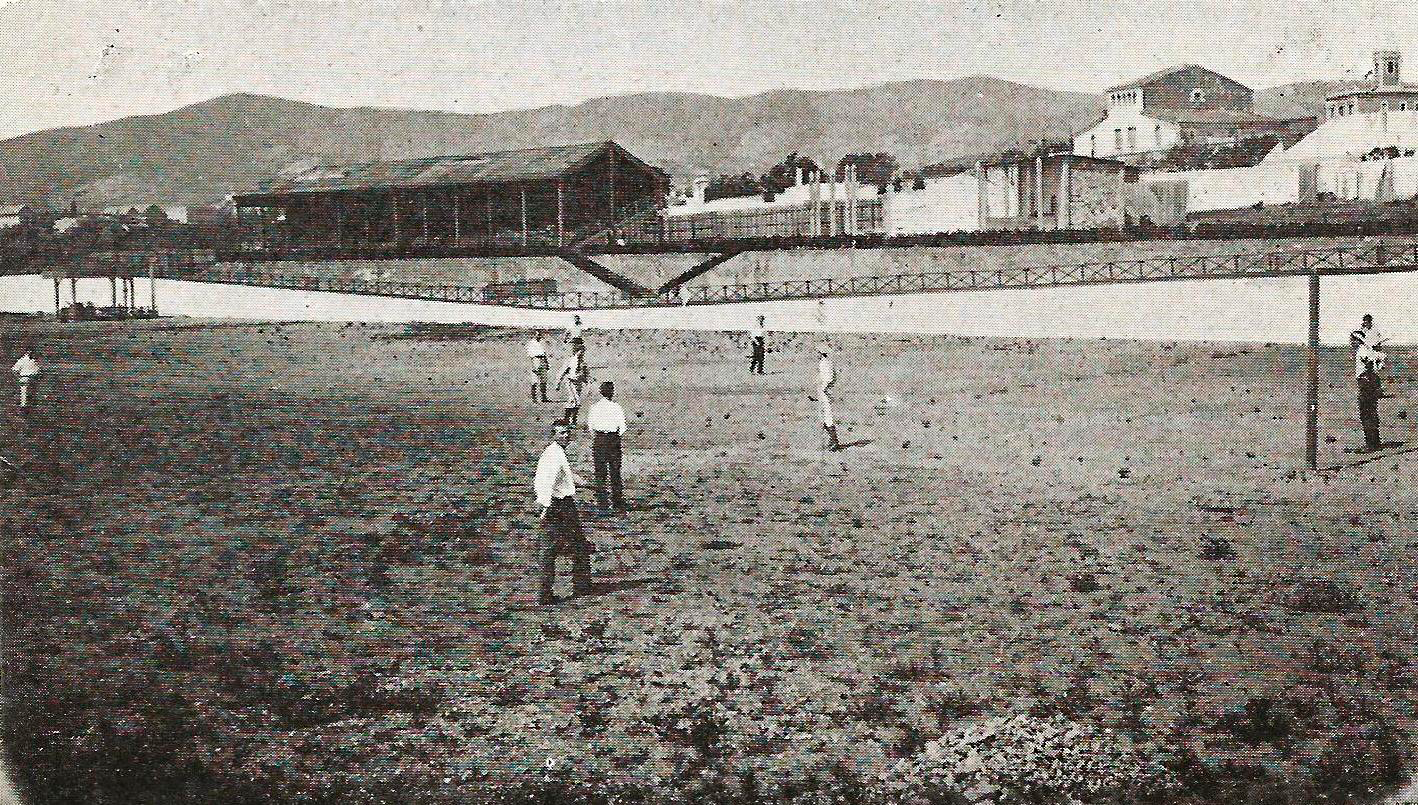
- Football match at the Bonanova Velodrome
- Interactive map of Velódromo de la Bonanova
- Location: Barcelona, Catalonia, Spain

Construction
- Opened: 24 September 1893
- Demolished: 1910
- Cost: 30.000 pesetas

Tenants
- Sociedad de Foot-Ball de Barcelona (1895–96) FC Barcelona (1899–1900) Català FC (1899–1910)

The Velódromo de la Bonanova was a sports venue in the city of Barcelona, Spain. It was the first velodrome in the city, although it was located in the neighboring municipality of Sant Gervasi, which in 1897 was annexed to the Catalan capital. Later it hosted other sports competitions, especially football, being the very first playing field of FC Barcelona.

It had a 400-meter stretch of cement with two 120-meter straight lines and two 80-meter banked cant. The preferred grandstand measured 40 meters and had ten stands. There was also a gallery for the jury and another for the press. The central field of grass was used for the practice of various sports, especially football, despite its irregularities, such as potholes and unevenness, and the usual presence of stones and thistles.

== Early success ==
The initiative to build a velodrome in the city of Barcelona was launched for the first time in November 1892 by the magazine "El ciclista", which was the official organ of the Barcelona Society of Velocipedists. On 28 November, all cycling fans in the city were summoned to a meeting at the "Centro Sport", and those present there formed a Society (Sociedad) for the construction and management of a velodrome. The chosen location for the velodrome was a 500,000 square span of land in Bonanova given that it was well connected to the city center thanks to the Sarrià train, an area which they agreed to purchase. The project was budgeted at 30,000 pesetas, which at the time represented a fortune, but the Society managed to cover such expenses thanks to 400 shares of 100 pesetas from its members and enthusiasts.

The inauguration of the venue took place almost a year later, on 24 September 1893, thus coinciding with La Mercè. Several races were held, the first of which was of international nature, and won by Lambrechts. A year later, on 26 July 1894, the cyclist Antonio de Sard set the Spanish record for the fastest hour without a coach, with a mark of 32 km and 415 m in 60 minutes.

== Football ==
After the initial euphoria, the velodrome fell into disuse, which in December 1894 caused its owners to negotiate the rental of the facilities to the Sociedad de Foot-Ball de Barcelona, a group of football pioneers in the city led by James Reeves, which was made up of members of the English colony of Barcelona who had been playing the sport of football at Hippodrome of Can Tunis and were looking for a place of easier access to the city center. The first football match played in Bonanova took place on 27 January 1895 and was played by 16 players from the Barcelona Football Society divided into two teams: one dressed in blue and the other one in red. From that date on, Sunday football games became a regular event at the velodrome, with cycling races being often interspersed with junior and senior football exhibitions. On 17 March 1895, the crowd filled Bonanova to see the very first matches between teams from two different cities played in Catalonia, which set the Barcelona Football Society up against a team from Torelló (Torelló Foot-ball Association), ending in a local victory by 8–3. In addition to Reeves, this group of football pioneers also included Alberto Serra, the Parsons brothers (John and William), the Morris brothers (Samuel and Enrique), and in Torelló's side, George Cockram and William MacAndrews. Apart from football, the velodrome also hosted shooting competitions, cricket and tennis matches, organized by the pioneers of said sports in the city.

The year 1898 was the last year that the Bonanova velodrome hosted cycling events, which were moved to other venues in the city, such as the new velodrome on Aragó street. Despite this, however, the venue remained known as the Bonanova velodrome, the name that the press kept attributed to it. The venue thus become entirely dedicated to the practice of football, especially when it became the first playing field of the first two clubs officially founded in Barcelona: Català FC and FC Barcelona, both from 1899. The members of the Tolosa Gym that founded Català FC began using the ex-velodrome for their rehearsals on 22 October, and a few weeks later, on 8 December, the Bonanova velodrome hosted FC Barcelona's very first game in its history against Team Anglès, a team from the English colony, largely made up of members of the defunct Barcelona Football Society, such as the Parsons and the Morris brothers, and new members such as the Witty brothers, Arthur and Ernest, being the former who netted the only goal of the match to seal a 1–0 English victory.

=== Rivalry between FC Barcelona and Català FC ===
In the following months, Bonanova witnessed the first great rivalry in Spanish football between FC Barcelona and Català FC. Being a rental field, Barcelona and Català had to share the velodrome, together with other groups in the city. The first derby between the two teams was played on the Christmas Eve of 1899, ending in a Barça victory by 3–1 thanks to a brace from Joan Gamper, who thus become Barça's first-ever goalscorer, and the other from Ernest Witty. Despite the existing rivalry, both teams decided to join forces to face Team Anglès two days later, on 26 December, which ended in a 2–1 win for the Catalan side courtesy of another brace from Gamper. The meeting, which brought together a large number of people in the velodrome, was described by the sports writer Alberto Serra as "the best party that sports athletics has organized in this city". The rivalry reached its climax on 11 February 1900, in a match between Barcelona, with eight Englishmen in its eleven, and Catalá, combined with Escocès FC, thus being reinforced with a group of six Scots. The match led to a fistfight between Stanley Harris and Willie Gold that the referee William Mauchan settled with the sending-off of both, an unprecedented event in Catalan and Spanish football. The scandal caused Joan Gamper, Barça's captain in this match, to resign from the position, and his partners agreed not to play again against the Scots of Català.

The ex-velodrome was the home ground of FC Barcelona for nine months, until Català reached an agreement with the owners to exclusively rent it, forcing their rivals to move to Hotel Casanovas. Barça played their last match at the Bonanova on 23 September 1900, precisely against Català FC, which was also the first match of the 1900–01 season. The Barcelona team won 3–1 with goals from Gamper and Otto Maier, thus winning the club's first-ever piece of silverware: An art object made of bronze offered by José Canalejas.

== Decline and Collapse ==
Català continued to play in the Bonanova until the end of 1910, the year in which the venue was demolished. The year of the enclosure is unknown. The last reference to its existence is from 1 December 1910, when the newly founded F.B. Lluro acquired the facilities (described as “the former field of Català”) and subsequently requested their entry into the Federation.
