= Hispania Athletic Club =

Football club in Spain active between 1900 and 1903

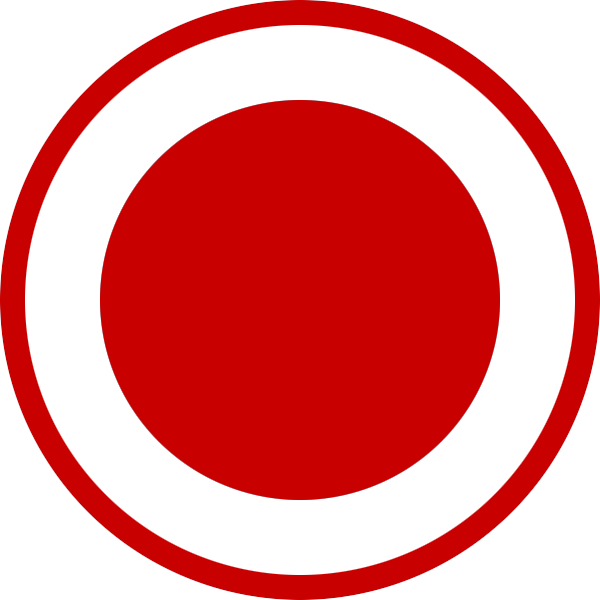
- Hispania Athletic Club
- Nickname: Team Rojo
- Short name: Hispania AC
- Founded: April 1900
- Dissolved: 19 November 1903
- Ground: Camp del carrer Muntaner
Home colours	Away colours	Third colours

The Hispània Athletic Club was a football team based in Barcelona, Spain, which existed during the years 1900 and 1903. It was one of the first football clubs in the city and in 1901, Hispania was the fundamental head behind the organization of the inaugural edition of the Copa Macaya, which was the first football competition played in the Iberian Peninsula, and they won the tournament after beating FC Barcelona and RCD Espanyol for the title, thus becoming the very first Spanish club to win an official title. The Copa Macaya was later recognized as the first edition of the Catalan championship, hence being were the first Catalan champion in history.

== History ==
Initially known as Team Rojo (Red Team), it was founded in May 1900 by players from Català FC, who were leaving the club due to a conflict between the club's members. It was common at the time for players to leave their respective teams to join or found others due to the still dispersed and confusing growth of football. Team Rojo made its official debut on 24 May, in a sports festival organized by the Polo Club, playing at the Hippodrome against FC Barcelona, which they lost 2–1, courtesy of a winner from Joan Gamper. Among the players who lined up for Team Rojo that day were Carlos Soley and Gustavo Green.

At the beginning of October 1900, the players of Team Rojo decided to legally establish themselves as a company, under the name of Hispania Athletic Club, which quickly became one of the most important clubs in the city, being not just a football club, but a Society that participated in other sports, such as athletics (foot races) and tennis, intending to promote the three indicated sections as much as possible and to frequently hold sports matches and festivals. Shortly after its establishment, it was approved for a Board to be elected to serve as the base of this entity, which was constituted by: Josep Ortiz as president; Fermín Lomba, vice president; Carlos Soley, secretary; Alberto Marro as vice secretary; Juan Soler as treasurer; and Luís Valls, Gaspar Lambea, and Victor Paniagua as members. Gustavo Green was chosen captain of the team and Miguel Sanmartín sub-captain. The directors of the entity's three sections were also subsequently elected: Football by its "intelligent captain" Green; the tennis section by Enrique Bushell, and the foot races by Fernando Soria Santacruz. The uniform of the football team was red shirts and white pants.

Hispania's first president was Josep Ortiz, but the soul of the club was the businessman Alfonso Macaya, a young man from the Catalan high bourgeoisie and passionate about emerging sports practices, such as fencing or tennis and football. Finally, Macaya was named honorary president of the Hispania Athletic Club, and as soon as he started his term he began to develop the idea of a football championship between different clubs.

The football team made their debut on 7 October 1900 at the Nuevo Velódromo de Barcelona against SD Santanach, ending in a goalless draw. On 18 November, Hispania took part in the inauguration of FC Barcelona's first-ever field, in front of the Casanovas Hotel. The match gathered nearly 4,000 spectators and the final result was again a goalless draw. Shortly after, Hispania took advantage of the dissolution of Escocès FC - a team made up of Scottish workers from a factory in Sant Andreu - to incorporate several of its most prominent players, such as J. Hamilton, J. Black and Willie Gold.

== 1900–01 Copa Macaya ==
After starting his term, its honorary president, Alfonso Macaya, began to develop the idea of a football championship between different clubs, and thus the Copa Macaya was born, the first regulated football competition played on the Iberian Peninsula. To create greater motivation, Macaya decided to donate a trophy to the winners of the tournament, which was open to all national clubs throughout the country, although in the end, only five Catalan teams participated (4 from Barcelona). Hispania were the pre-favourites to win the competition together with FC Barcelona, and it was they who opened the competition on 20 January 1901 in Barça's field at the Hotel Casanovas, and Hispania won the match 2–1 thanks to two goals from captain Gustavo Green. The Hispania team that lined up that day was: S. Morris; Soler, Gold; Sanmartín, Soley, Ortiz; Lomba, Black, Green, Leigh, and E. Morris.

This victory proved to be decisive in the outcome of the tournament since the rest of the participating teams basically played a "formality role", as Barcelona and Hispania beat them all with thrashings, with Hispania's biggest ones coming against Franco-Española with resoundings 0–10 and 14–0 wins, in the latter, Hamilton netted 6 goals, while Green and Black clutched a hat-trick. Naturally, the title was only decided when they met again, now at Hispania's home ground, on the last matchday on 14 April, with Hispania having 14 points against Barcelona's 12, thus if the latter achieved victory, the title would have to be decided with a tiebreaker, a play-off. In the first half, Hispania went ahead thanks to an own goal from an undetermined Barcelona player, and then managed to resist Barça's siege largely thanks to their goalkeeper, Samuel Morris, who conceded a goal from Joan Gamper in the second half, which was not enough to prevent Hispania from holding to the draw and hence become the first Catalan champion in history. However, this historic meeting was not without controversy, since the referee annulled a second goal from Barcelona for offside, a decision that was heavily contested, with Barça claiming bias in the refereeing in favor of the organizers of the tournament.

The tournament itself had been wrapped in further controversy when on 10 March 1901, Hispania faced Club Español (now known as RCD Espanyol) in a match that turned out to be a real disaster: Hispania's changed home grounds in the middle of the tournament, going from Frare Blanch to the Camp del Carrer Muntaner, thus the ground was making its official debut, which went terribly wrong as the ground had a slight incline at various points; the goal frames fell twice, two Espanyol players had to leave the field of play due to injuries, and in the face of such an accumulation of nonsense, Espanyol chose to leave the field before the end of the match, thinking of raising a protest against the competition committee, but they gave up from the idea knowing that the committee would always rule in favor of Hispania, so they withdrew from the tournament after the fourth match, claiming that the refereeing was in Hispania's aid.

== 1901–02 Copa Macaya ==
After being crowned the best Catalan team of the moment, "the reds" started the 1901–02 season with a major setback: the departure of its captain and best player, Gustavo Green, to direct rivals FC Barcelona. Furthermore, striker Alejandro Leigh left for Bilbao and Carlos Soley, club secretary and midfielder, returned to his native Costa Rica. Consequently, there were also changes in the board of directors: José Ortiz took over as secretary to replace Soley, leaving the presidency of the club to Eduardo Alesson, a renowned fencing teacher from Barcelona.

Alesson was decisive in the history of Catalan football, as together with Joan Gamper he promoted the creation of what would become the current Catalan Football Federation, which was the first football federation created in Spain. The founding meeting took place in December 1902 and Hispania was one of the founding clubs. Alesson was elected the Association's first president.

In the second edition of the Copa Macaya, the scenario of the previous season was repeated, with a clear superiority of Hispania and Barcelona over the rest of the teams, thus, the title was decided in the direct confrontations between them once again. In the first round, Barcelona beat Hispania 2–4, and when they met again on the penultimate day, Barça won again by the minimum margin with a goal from Udo Steinberg and mathematically secured the title.

At the end of the 1901–02 Macaya Cup, Hispania was invited to participate in the Copa de la Coronación, but rejected the invitation since its players could not afford the trip to Madrid.

== 1902–03 Copa Macaya ==
By the end of 1902, Hispania is already suffering difficulties, but it still has the strength and courage to organize the third edition of its championship. Macaya distances himself from the Organization, which falls to Shields. This time, Hispania's main rival was Club Espanyol since Barça withdrew after their 2–0 win over Hispania AC was declared invalid for fielding an ineligible player. Club Espanyol and Hispania AC finished level on points at 6, which meant that the title had to be decided in a playoff match that was held a few months later on 12 April 1903, which they lost 1–3, courtesy of a brace from their former player Gustavo Green.

Hispania also participated in the Copa Barcelona, a tournament organized by FC Barcelona after their withdrawal from the Copa Macaya, and Hispania finished third behind Barcelona and Club Español. On 19 April 1903, Hispania lost to Barça 0–1 in the Copa Barcelona, thus condemning them to bronze.

From 1903 to 1904 onwards, the Copa Macaya began to be organized by the Catalan Football Federation and it became known as the Campionat de Catalunya. With the decline of the Hispania AC at the end of 1903, it was evident that the history of the Copa Macaya was coming to an end, thus sparking the debate of who was entitled to take the Cup as its own, since a different team won in each edition (Hispania AC, FC Barcelona and Español). To resolve the situation, a championship was organized in November 1903 between the previous three champions, solely to decide who would have the right to keep the trophy. However, when November came, Hispania had already disappeared, and the cup was ultimately awarded to Español FC.

== Decline and collapse ==
Hispania used the Muntaner field until its disappearance in 1903; the pitch would later be used by FC Barcelona and Español.

Hispania played their last game on 15 November 1903, losing 2–0 against Salud. On November 19, the entity's board agreed to its dissolution due to a lack of players, partly motivated by the departure of its most emblematic players, who joined other clubs, mainly FC Barcelona. The club donated its funds and materials (goals, nets, etc.) to the Club Association.

== Honours ==
Copa Macaya

- Winners (1): 1900–01
- Runners-up (2): 1901–02, 1902–03
