= Walter Wild =

Swiss engineer, tradesman, footballer, and co-founder of FC Barcelona

Wild during his presidency

Walter Wild, known in Catalan as Gualteri Wild (13 October 1872 – 16 December 1953), was a Swiss engineer, tradesman, footballer, and one of the twelve founders of FC Barcelona. He was club's first president for 513 days from 13 December 1899 to 27 December 1900, being re-elected three times, but eventually resigning due to work.

He combined his duties as president with playing, having played total of ten matches for the club including the first one. His main achievement for the club was getting its first home ground at Hotel Casanovas. After his resignation, Wild was awarded honorary president in recognition of his contribution to the club, but having moved to London (which prompted the widespread mistake of attributing British nationality to him), he showed little further interest in the club until 1949, when he returned as an Honorary Guest on Barcelona's 50th Anniversary.
