= Mataró Museum =

Coordinates: 41°32′23.42″N 2°26′42.91″E

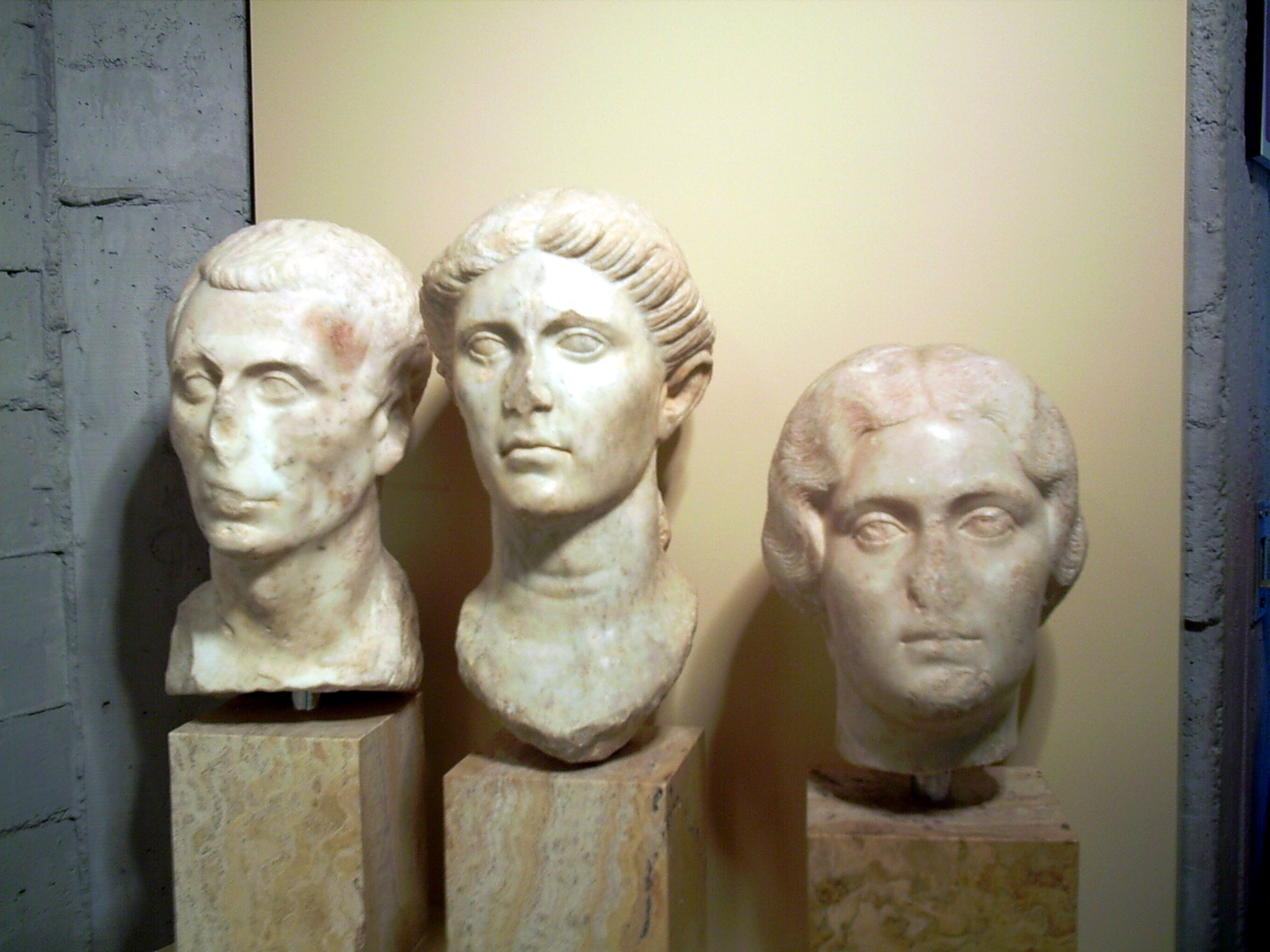
Roman sculptures at Mataró Museum

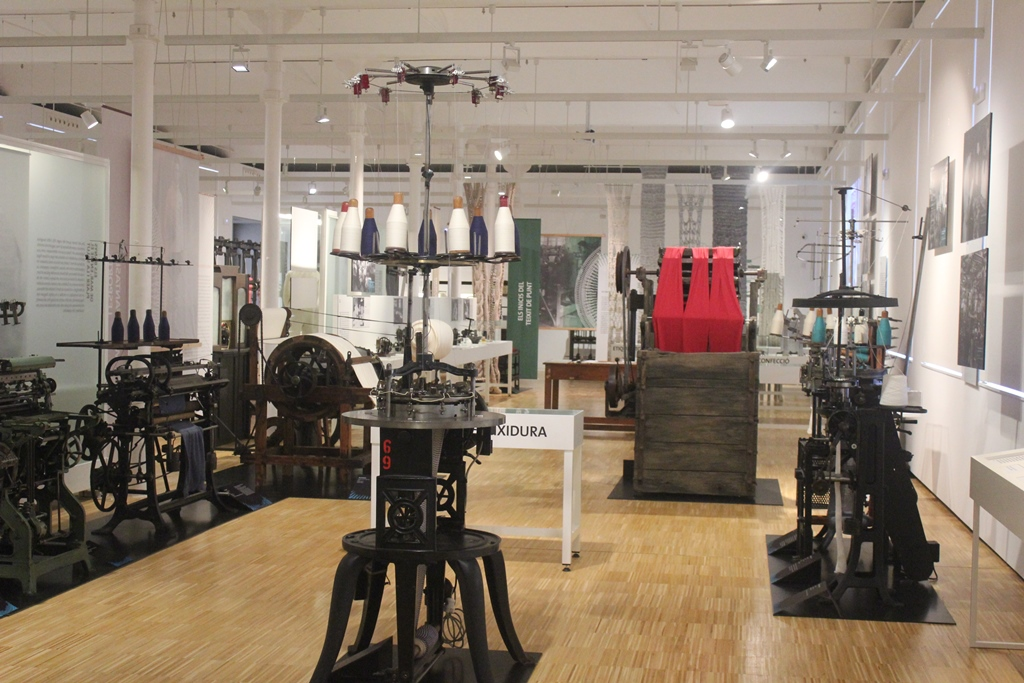
The Can Marfà Knitwear Museum

The Mataró Museum is a museum in Mataró, in El Maresme, with a central office in Can Serra, a fortified Renaissance building dating back to 1565. The museum, which is part of the Barcelona Provincial Council Local Museum Network, also manages the different local heritage centres, such as:

- The Ca l’Arenas Art Centre, part of the Mataró Museum.
- The Torre Llauder Archaeological Site.
- The El Montnegre i el Corredor Park Documentation Centre of the Catalan Coastal Range.
- The Can Marfà Knitwear Museum is devoted to the knit fabric industry.

== Building ==
Can Serra, built in 1565, is Renaissance-style building with a ground floor and two upper floors. The facade is particularly noteworthy for its voussoir doorway and its windows framed by mouldings and corbels. The original interior structure has been preserved, including the original wood panelling, which is of particular interest.

== Collections ==
The museum's collections are highly diverse, both in terms of origin and type, and comprise archaeological materials from prehistoric, Iberian, Roman, Medieval and modern times, natural specimens, historical objects and an art collection made up of religious retables and carvings and Baroque, Art Nouveau and Noucentista paintings, of which a series of engravings by Goya are of particular note.

== Torre Llauder Archaeological Site ==
The Torre Llauder Archaeological Site is where the remains of the stately quarters of a Roman village, with mosaic tiles, are preserved. Built in the time of Augustus, at the end of the 1st century BC, it was part of the territory comprising the Roman city of Iluro.

== Ca l'Arenas Art Centre ==
The Ca l'Arenas Art Centre of the Mataró Museum is a product of artist Jordi Arenas i Clavell's legacy to his hometown, an offshoot of the Mataró Museum specialising in art, with special emphasis on artistic activity in the city of Mataró.

== Can Marfà Knitwear Museum ==
The Can Marfà Knitwear Museum is devoted to the knitting and hosiery industry.

== See also ==
- Casa Coll i Regàs
