= Cultural Asset of National Interest =

Cultural heritage designation in Catalonia

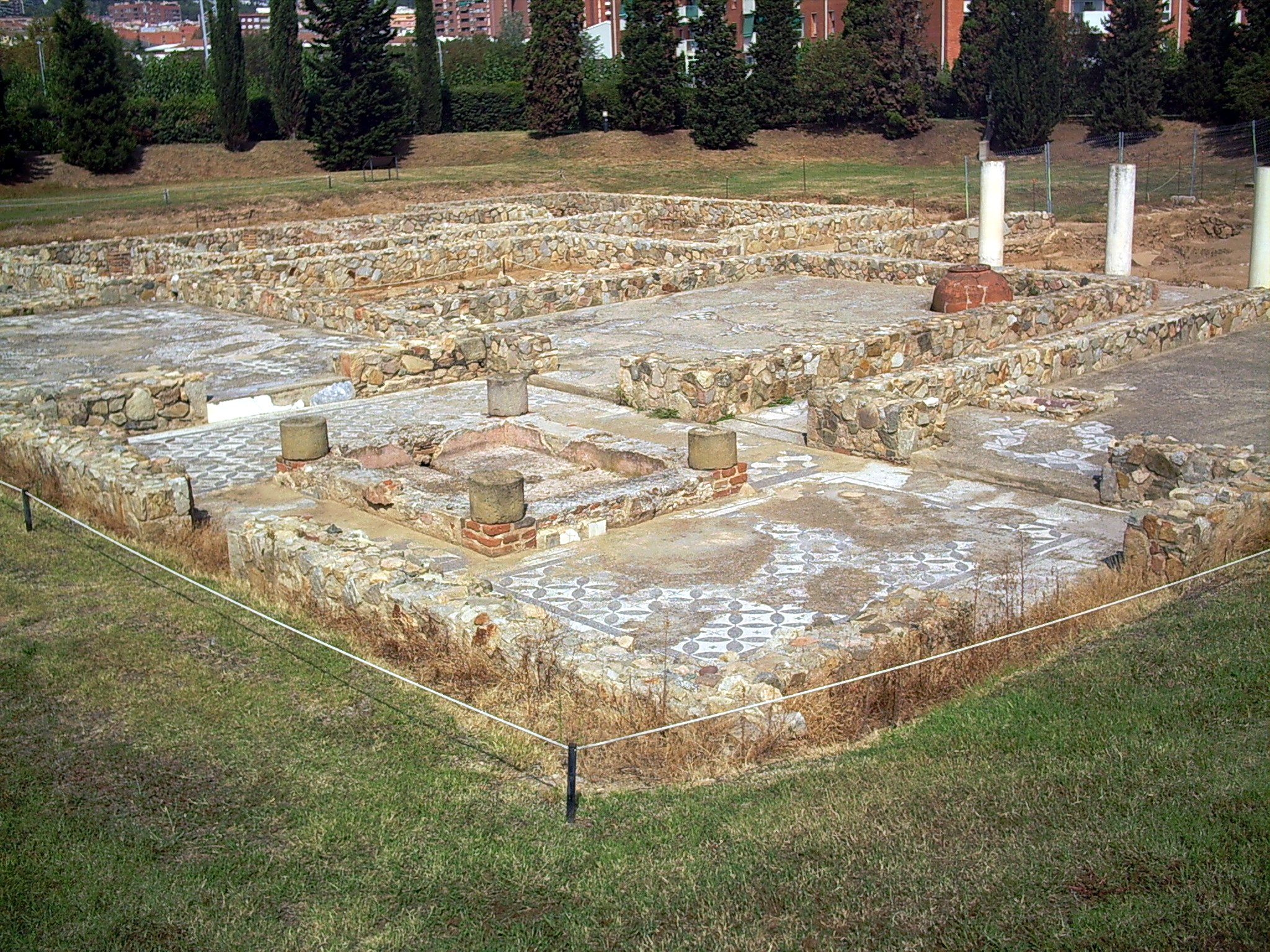
The Roman villa of Can Llauder in Mataró, an Archaeological Zone BCIN

A Cultural Asset of National Interest (Catalan: Bé cultural d'interès nacional, BCIN) is a heritage asset that has been designated for legal protection as one the most significant assets of Catalan cultural heritage, which may be a building, site, movable asset, an asset of intangible cultural heritage, or a collection of the above. This status is granted by the Catalan government, and a given asset which is deemed to be of national interest must be recorded in the Register of Cultural Assets of National Interest. Designation as a BCIN represents the highest category of protection for cultural assets in Catalonia, with the other two being the Cultural Asset of Local Interest (bé cultural d'interès local, BCIL) and the Archaeological Protection Area (espai de protecció arqueològica, EPA).

The designation came into effect in 1993. Under the relevant law passed by the Catalan Parliament, heritage assets in Catalonia which had previously been declared under Spanish law to be sites of cultural interest (Bienes de interés cultural) transitioned legally to Cultural Assets of National Interest, bringing them under the remit of the Catalan authorities. As such, a number of BCINs are entered in the register with a date preceding 1993. In addition to reasons of the protection of heritage for its own sake, the creation of the category and designation of assets as BCINs may also have been motivated by a desire on the part of Catalan institutions to increase cultural tourism for economic reasons, and to disperse this tourism more widely throughout Catalonia.

== Classification ==
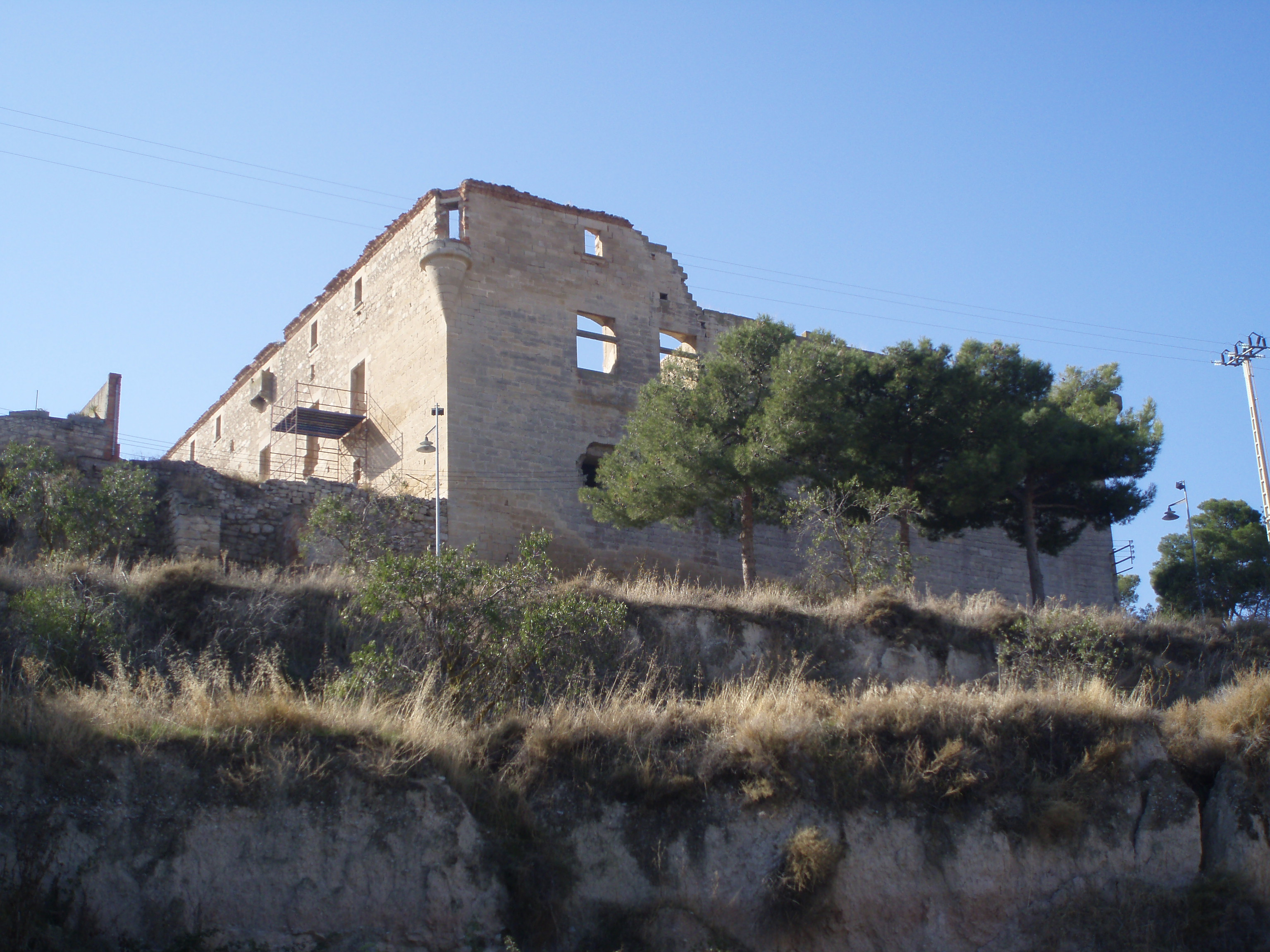
Maldà Castle in Urgell, a Historic Monument BCIN

According to the law, the most significant examples of Catalan cultural heritage must be designated by the government as BCINs, which are to be classified as follows:

- Historic Monument: a construction or other material work produced through human endeavour, configured as a single unit.
- Historic Ensemble: a group of immovable properties, whether contiguous or separated, forming a coherent and definable unit with its own identity, even where each individual element may not be of particular significance.
- Historic Garden: a defined space which is the result of the human arrangement of natural elements, and which may include fabricated structures.
- Historic Site: a natural area where a group of immovable properties is found which form a coherent unit for historical and cultural reasons associated with past events or aspects of historic memory, or which contain manmade works of historic or technical value.
- Zone of Ethnological Interest: a collection of relics, which may include buildings, installations and interventions in the natural landscape, containing elements which form a key part of the ethnological heritage of Catalonia.
- Archaeological Zone: a place where there are the remains of human intervention which can only be studied in depth through archaeological methods, whether they are found on the surface, underground or underwater.
- Palaeontological Zone: a place where there is a collection of fossilised remains forming a coherent unit with its own identity, whether or not each individually is of particular significance.

Movable assets may be declared to be of national interest either individually or as part of a collection.

== Examples ==
Examples of Cultural Assets of National Interest include:

- Cala s'Alguer
- Casa de les Punxes
- Casa Vicens
- The Jewish cemetery of Montjuïc
- Lladrefavres, a processional giant from Valls
- Montjuïc Castle
- Requesens Castle
- Roca dels Bous archaeological site
- Roman Villa of Can Llauder
