= La Escocesa =

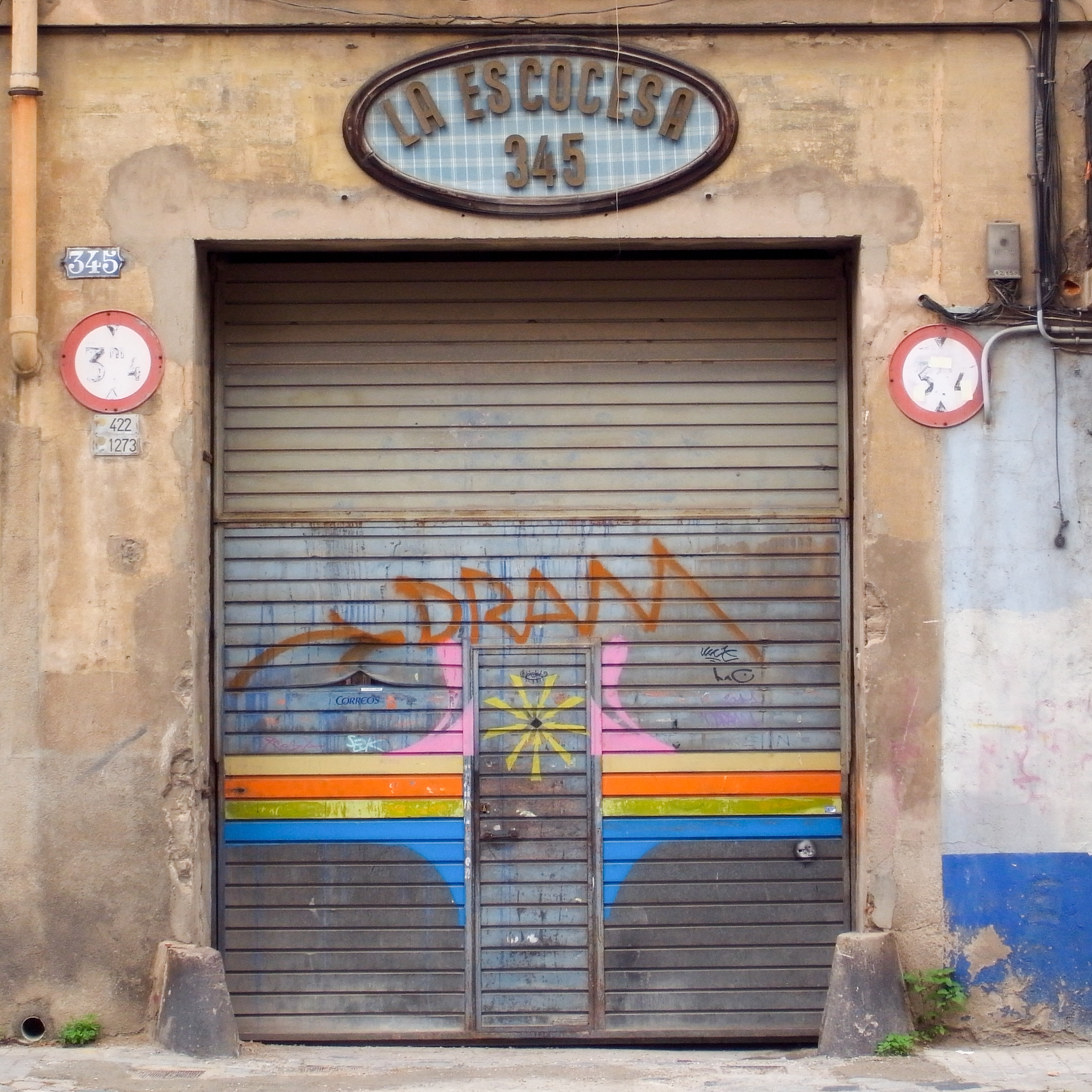
- Interactive map of the La Escocesa area

General information
- Architectural style: Industrial Architecture
- Location: Carrer Pere IV, 353 (2)
- Coordinates: 41.4115°N 2.2036°E
- Construction started: 1845
- Opened: 1852
- Closed: 1900

Technical details
- Floor area: 7.400 m²

The La Escocesa was a factory complex located between Pere IV and Bolívia streets in El Poblenou, Barcelona, Spain; it was listed as a Cultural Asset of Local Interest.

== History ==
Around 1845, taking advantage of the good location of a rectangular plot of land between the old road from Barcelona to Mataró (now Pere IV) and the old lakebed, some houses of two floors (including a ground floor) were built. With the subsequent construction of several buildings and industrial warehouses, this plot of land eventually became a factory in 1852, whose original use was the production of chemicals for industry.

After the factory closed, it became an industrial complex, whose first building dates from approximately 1885 and was a printed textile factory owned by the Paul family. From 1877 onwards, several companies occupied the industrial site because part of the old factory was rented out.

=== Football team ===
In 1894, Edward Birkhead Steegmann, an engineer from Nottingham, and John Shields, a Scottish industrialist, rented the central warehouses to establish a branch of Johnston, Shields & Co in Catalonia, which became known as La Escocesa, and then around 40 young Scottish workers were sent to the company's newly opened factor. The patents they introduced were based on the manufacture of crochet stitch, ideal for making curtains and lace, with the Scottish boys training the workers in the new technique. The adventure of the Scots lasted until 1984 and served to christen the space.

Whilst out in the Catalan capital, the Johnston's Scots began to play football against each other to pass the time, undergo leisure initiatives, and feel more at home. Eventually, they formed a team captained by Willie Gold, the supervisor of the La Escocesa factory, a position he held for fifteen years (1893–1908), and which included the likes of John Hamilton and Jim Dykes. During the winter of 1893–94, the so-called Scottish colony of Sant Martí played a series of matches against the English Colony of Barcelona, with the Barcelona press reported matches between these two sides played on 8 December 1893, 11 March, and 15 April 1894, however, due to the little statistical rigor that the newspapers had at that time, very little is known about those matches, but local historians claim that this was the first ever 'unofficial' rivalry in Spanish football. These Scottish workers would later create Escocès FC, while the English Colony went on to create Team Anglès, two teams who were pivotal in the amateur beginnings of Catalan football.

Later, and until 1998, the manufacturing activity was maintained through the Lace Bobinet cooperative. In 2006, La Escocesa was included in the Fàbriques per la creación artística program, and has become the La Escocesa Creation Center. Since 2008, it has been managed by the EMA Associació d'Idees, created by the resident artists themselves and a cultural manager.

== Lay out ==
Since 1852, the former chemical products factory for the textile industry has had successive expansions and adaptations (made in some cases by Anglo-Saxon owners), which give the factory complex an image of 19th-century British industry. Two passages perpendicular to Pere IV Street give access to the area and articulate the different built volumes, which are located both on the perimeter of the plot and inside it. The buildings have different heights, ranging from ground floor to three floors. The structural and roofing solutions are very heterogeneous: flat roofs, gable roofs, wooden trusses, wooden or metal beams with ceramic corbels, cast iron pillars, etc.
