= Mauchan =

Mauchan is a surname. Notable people with the surname include:

- David Mauchan (1895–?), English-born Scottish footballer
- Peter Mauchan (1882–1943), Scottish footballer
- William Mauchan (1856–1927), Scottish footballer and referee
