= Cultural Asset of Local Interest =

Cultural heritage designation in Catalonia

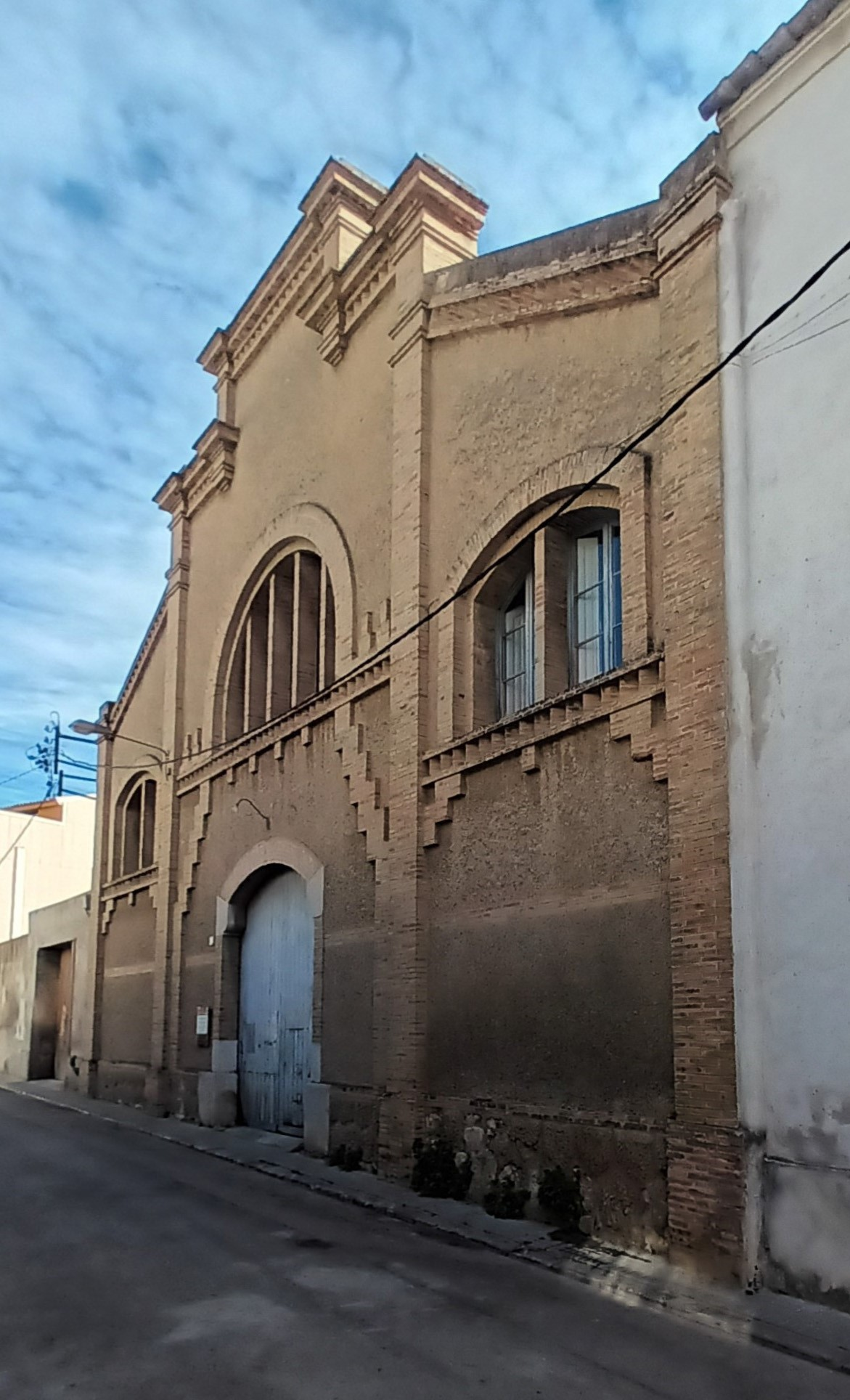
The Jean Mory Warehouse in Vilafranca del Penedès is an example of a Cultural Asset of Local Interest

Cultural Asset of Local Interest (Catalan: Bé cultural d'interès local, BCIL) is a category of legal protection for heritage assets in Catalonia. This designation may be applied to buildings, sites, movable property or assets of intangible cultural heritage which are deemed to be culturally significant but do not meet the conditions for designation as a Cultural Asset of National Interest (BCIN).

The designation of an asset as a BCIL is declared by the local municipality (Ajuntament) in municipalities with more than 5000 inhabitants, while in those with fewer than 5000 inhabitants this is done at a meeting of the comarcal council. Once such a local declaration has been made for a given heritage asset, the Department of Culture of the Catalan government is then obliged to inscribe the heritage asset in question in the register of the Inventory of Catalan Cultural Heritage (l'Inventari del Patrimoni Cultural Català).

This is the second level of heritage protection at the autonomous government level in Catalonia, and this designation is equivalent, for example, to the Asset of Local Importance (bé de rellevància local) in the Valencian Community.

The Poble Espanyol building in Barcelona is one notable example of a Cultural Asset of Local Interest.
