= Can Marfà Knitwear Museum =

Coordinates: 41.53930°N 2.45133°E

- Can Marfà. Museu del Gènere de Punt
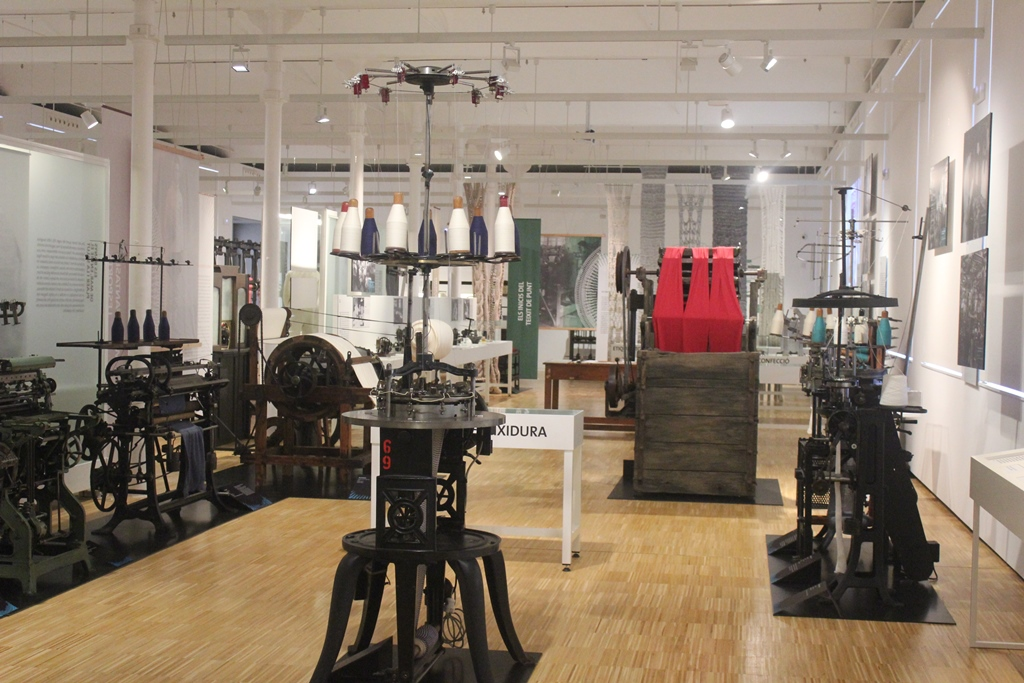
- Established: February 2015
- Location: Passatge de Can Marfà 1, Mataró, Barcelona, Spain
- Type: Textile museum

The Can Marfà Knitwear Museum (Catalan: Can Marfà. Museu del Gènere de Punt), located in Mataró , Catalonia (Spain). Part of the Mataró Museum it is devoted to the knitting and hosiery industry. It is situated in one of the three-storey warehouses of the former Marfà factory in Mataró, the most important Knitted fabric factory in Spain before 1936.

The facility has 1,800 m^{2} distributed over three floors.

== Ground floor: The temporary exhibition area ==
The ground floor houses the history of textile industry, technology, design and fashion. It is the area of temporary exhibitions.

== First floor: Mataró, the capital of knitwear ==
The permanent exhibition presents more than one hundred industrial objects explaining the knitwear manufacturing process in Catalonia from the 18th century to present day: Machinery, tools, clothing, advertising and documents, aiming to highlight one of the most important collections of its kind in Europe.

=== Thematic areas ===
The exhibition is arranged in seven thematic areas:

- Audiovisual introduction: Overview of the characteristics of the knitwear industry in Mataró.
- From Fiber to Mesh: The manufacturing process of knitwear: Spinning, weaving, design, cutting, Finishing and Packaging and labeling.
- The early years of knitting: From traditional to mechanical looms.
- The industrialization of knitwear: Technological innovation and labor force in the textile factories. The social and urban impact. Singularity of the knitting industry for the city of Mataró.
- Fashion, fantasy and sport: The changes in the patterns of clothing, the influence of fashion and the upcoming of new products and technological innovations.
- From autarky to expansion of the textile sector: The drive to the construction of knitwear machinery. The supplier industry. The impact of the nylon revolution.
- The future of the textile industry: The importance of design and the impact of new technologies.

=== Gallery first floor ===
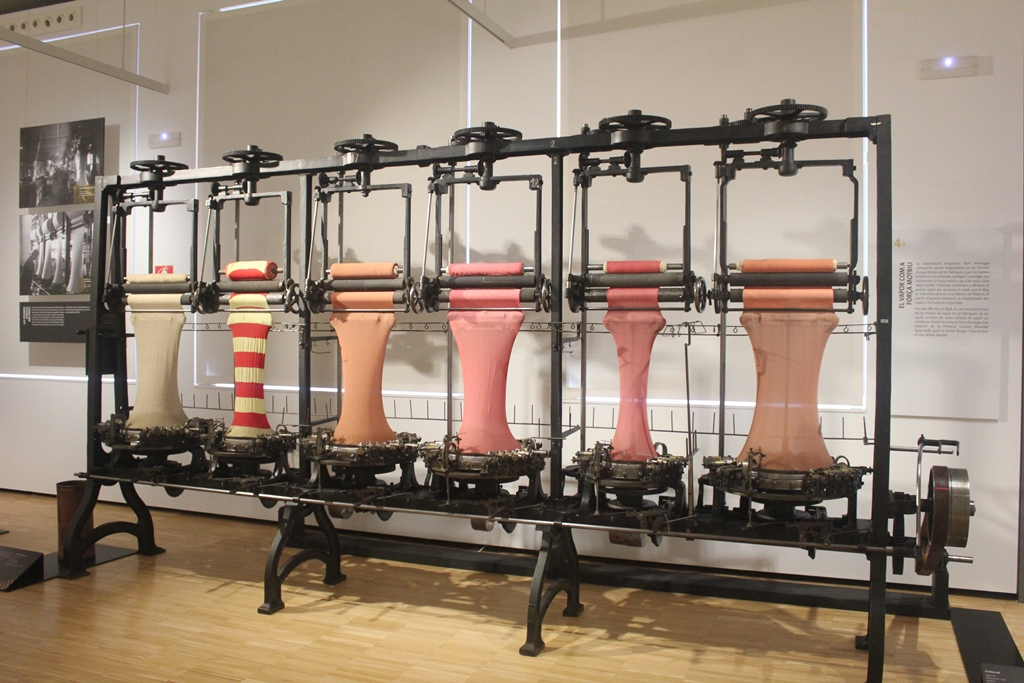
Row of looms

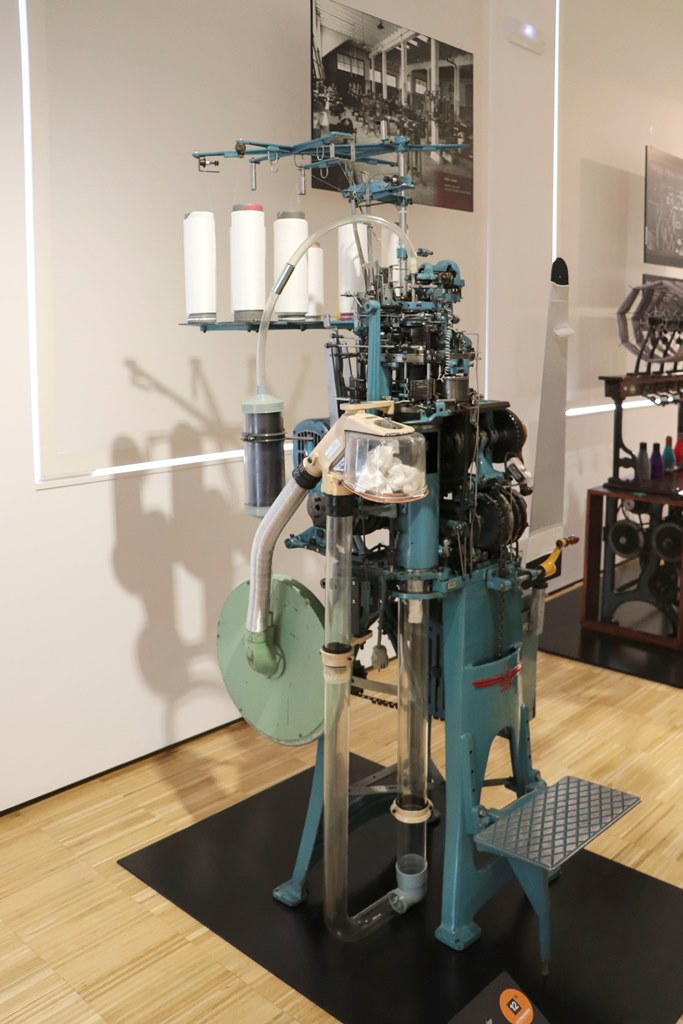
Circular loom 1965

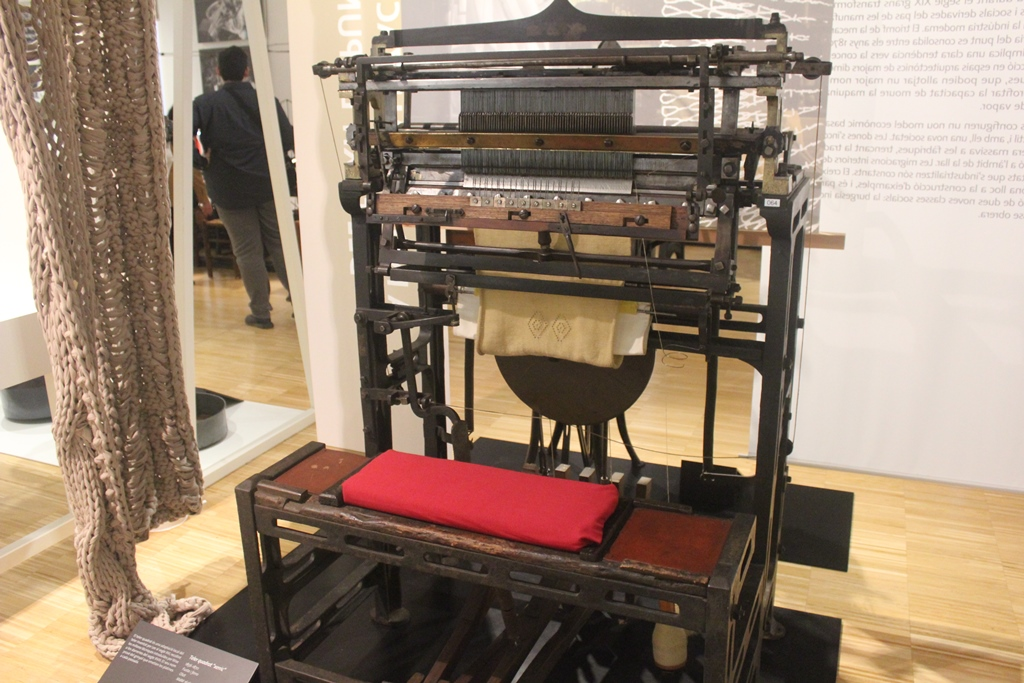
Square loom

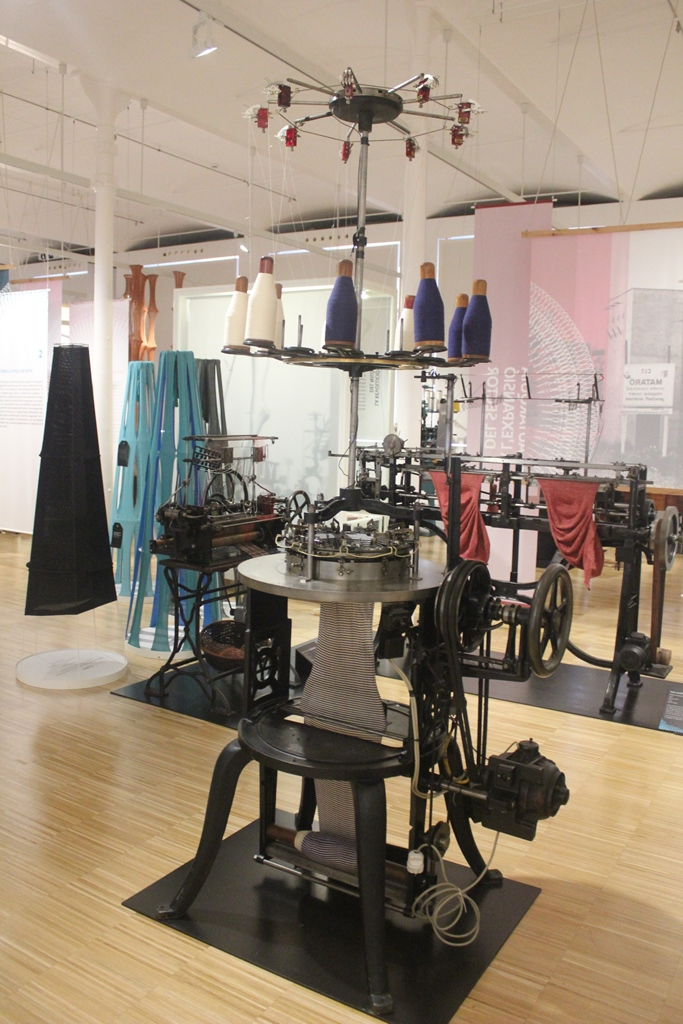
Circular loom
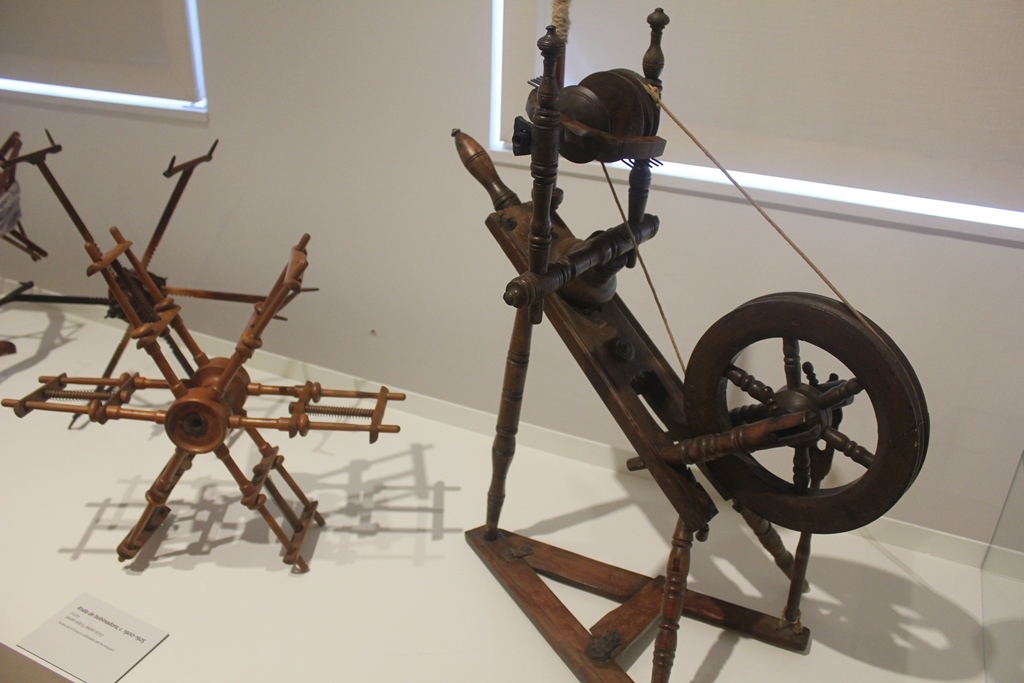
Spinning wheel

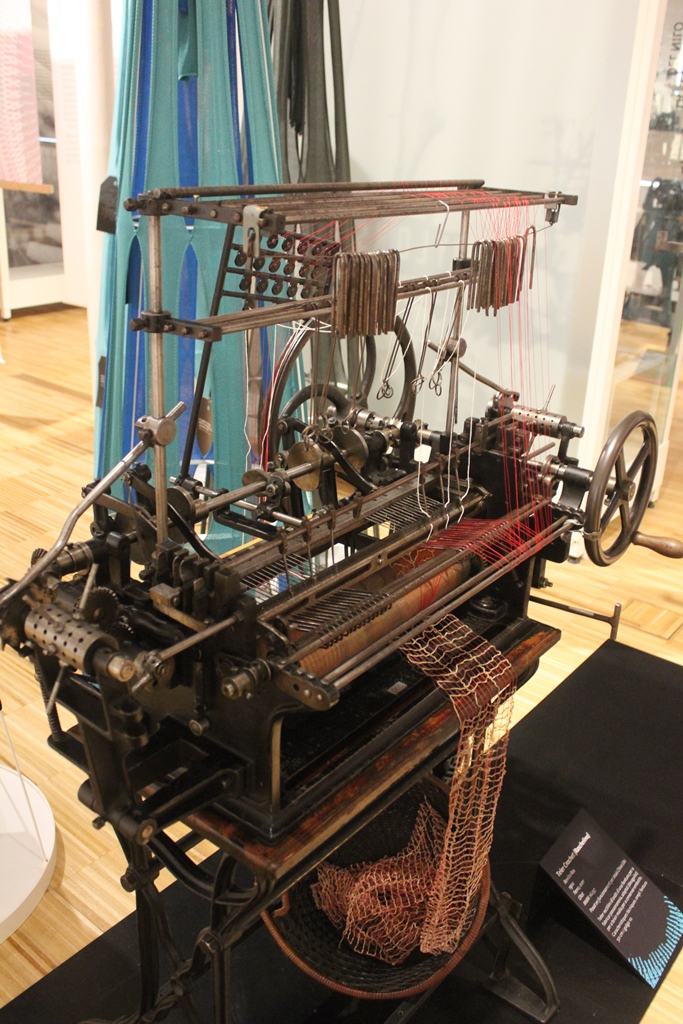
Straight loom crochet 1910

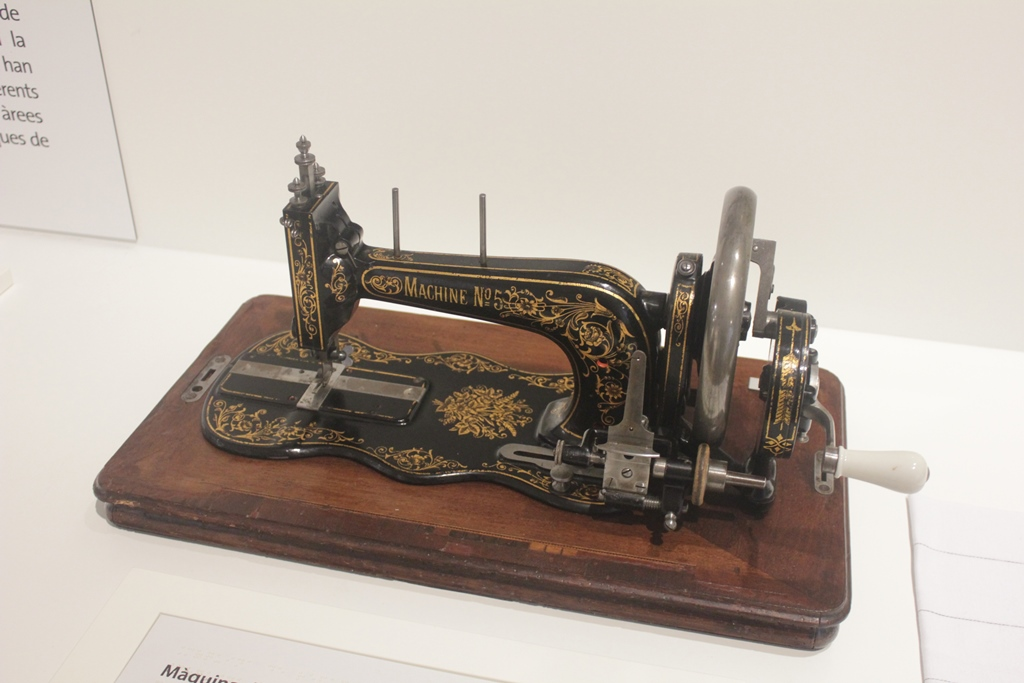
Sewing machine

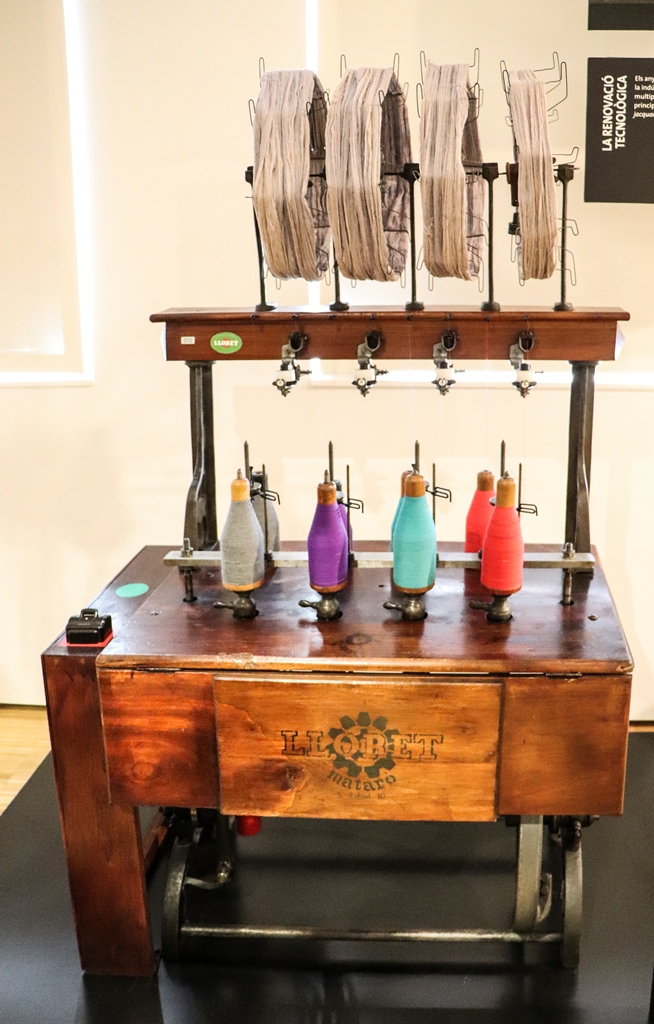
Winding machine

== Second floor: Warehouse of textile collections ==
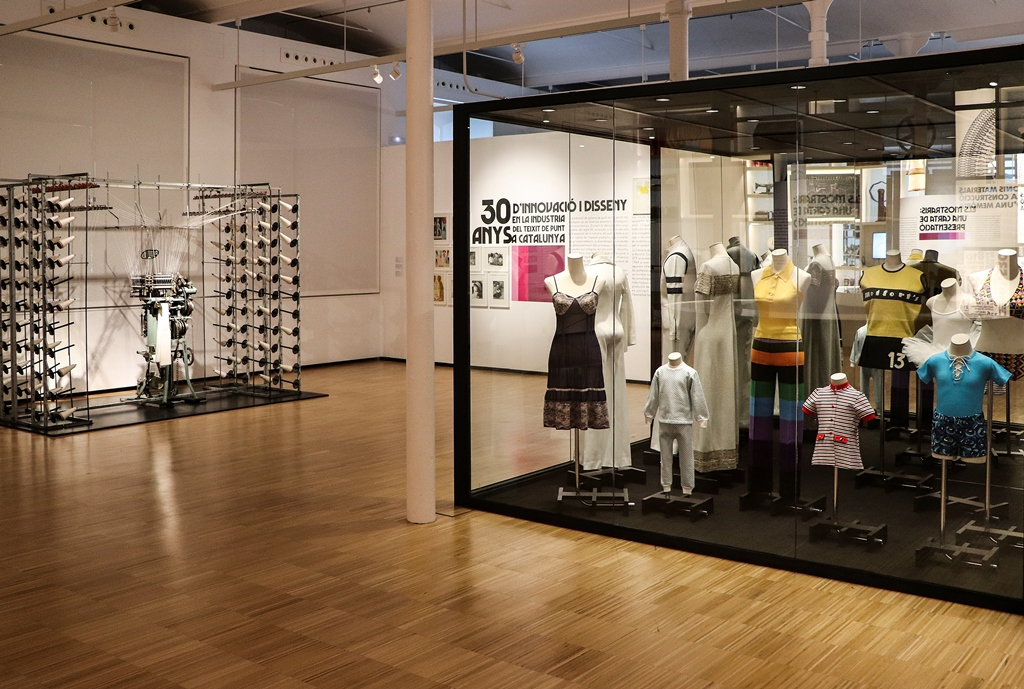
Second floor

The second floor houses documentation, preservation and research areas and displays a selection of clothing items from the 1960s to the 1980s.
