= Manuel Bofarull Palau =

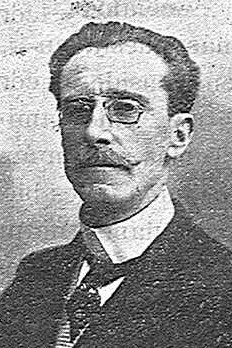
- Born: Manuel Bofarull Palau; 1851; Mataró, Spain
- Died: 1929 (aged 77–78); Madrid, Spain
- Occupations: lawyer, notary
- Known for: jurist, politician
- Political party: Carlism

Manuel Bofarull Palau (1851–1929) was a Spanish jurist and politician from Catalonia. He has not risen to major honors in jurisprudence, yet he wrote a law reference book which is currently considered "part of the knowledge base of civilization" and which was re-printed as late as 2023. Ideologically he generally remained within moderate Catalan right-wing Catholicism. However, between the mid-1900s and the mid-1910s he was engaged in Carlism and briefly entered its national executive, though he did not play a major role in the movement. His political climax fell on 1907–1912, when he was member of the Cortes; in 1907-1910 he served in Congreso de los Diputados, and in 1910–1912 in the Senate.

== Family and youth ==
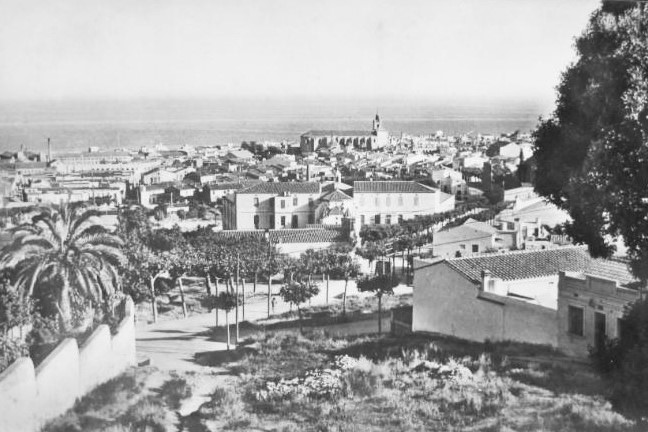
Mataró, early 20th c.

Manuel's paternal ancestors can be traced to the 17th century; a Pau Bofarull resided in Savallà del Comtat, where his son Miguel Bofarull (1650–1712) was born and married. His son, Joan Bofarull Montanya, a cloth merchant, moved to Santa Coloma de Queralt. It was his son, Magin Bofarull Ventalló (1731–1811), a grocer and confectioner, who in 1755 settled in Mataró. After his wife he inherited a large commerce business, and grew to prominence in the city. His son Magin Bofarull Carbonell (1764–1845, the grandfather of Manuel) developed the business further on, founding branches as far as in Cartagena; he also purchased landed property. His son and the father of Manuel, Gaspar Bofarull Carbonell (1814–1885), inherited some business after his childless brother and having married in 1839 Manuela Palau Català (1818–1880), daughter to a "haciendado". He multiplied the family wealth even more, his estates and assets located in Mataró, Barcelona, Cartagena and Valencia. A contemporary scholar claims that the Bofarulls "are a perfect example of the evolution of families that base their wealth on commercial initiatives, and that over the generations become landowners and, amidst comfort and luxury, evolve towards non-productive social forms". Though with no gentry roots, they started to pose as nobility.

Gaspar and Manuela had 6 children, 3 girls and 3 boys, born between 1840 and 1851; it is the sons who would start to appear as "de Bofarull". Manuel was the youngest one. He frequented the Instituto in Barcelona; in 1868 and with sobresaliente marks he obtained the baccalaureate there. He then entered the University of Barcelona, becoming licenciado in derecho civil y canónico in 1873. Having moved to Madrid, at Central he graduated as doctor in both civil and canon law with the thesis Determinación del concepto del Derecho: su relación con la Moral, defended in 1877. In 1878 he was admitted to Colegio de Abogados in Barcelona and started to practice, though either in 1880 or in 1881 he switched to notariado, still in Barcelona.

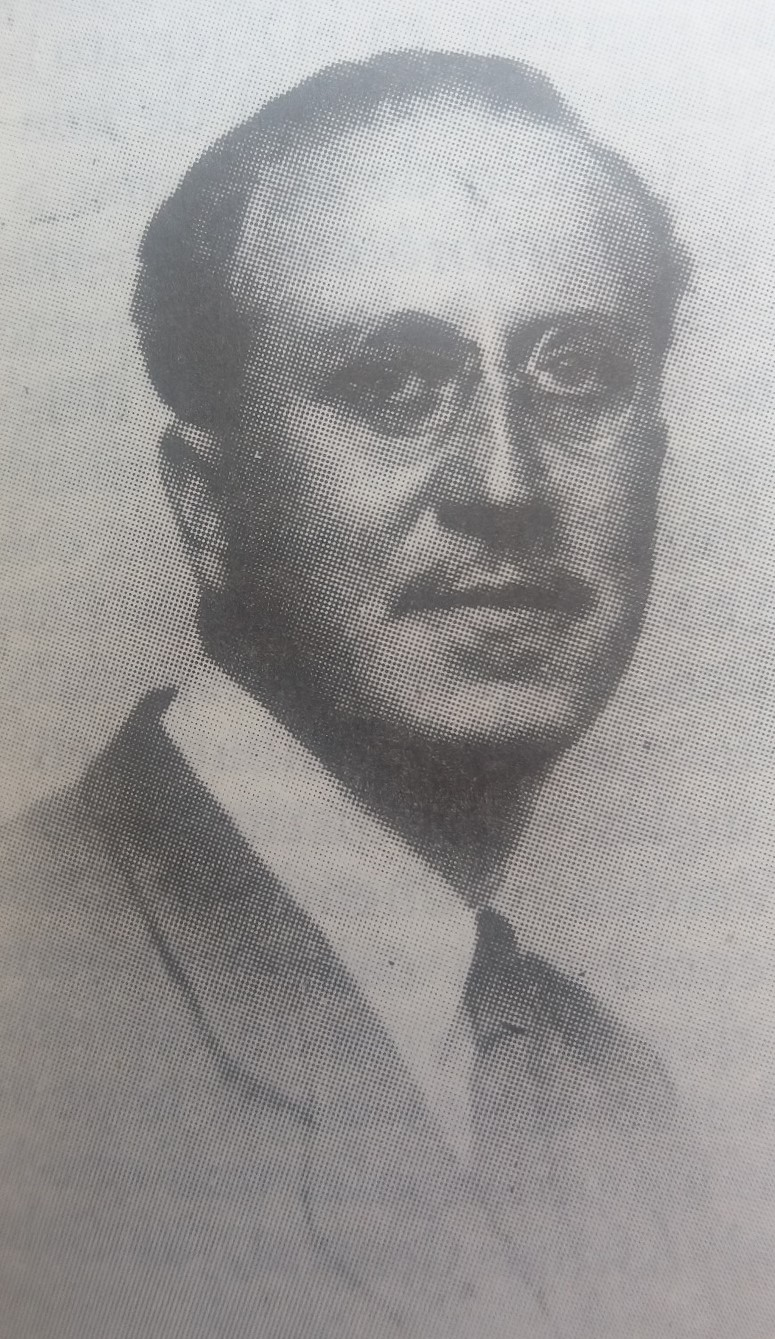
son

In 1883 Bofarull married Clara Romañá Suari, 5 years his junior and descendant to a family of wealthy Catalan bourgeoisie; the couple lived in Barcelona, though in the mid-1880s they moved permanently to Madrid, where Manuel continued to practice as a notary. The couple had 5 children. The only one who became a public figure was Manuel de Bofarull Romañá, a politician and Cortes deputy in the 1950s. Bofarull's grandson, Ignacio Uriarte Bofarull, gained some recognition as an ACNDP activist during late Francoism and afterwards. Among other relatives his brother-in-law, engaged in electricity, manufacturing, railways and construction businesses, was granted the title of barón de Romañá. Bofarull's oldest brother Juan, a landowner and merchant, served as vice-consul of Portugal, while the other one José became a religious and headed càtedra de Psicologia i Lògica in the Barcelona seminary; their sister Concepción, also a religious, became superiora of the Sant Josep convent in Mataró. His maternal cousin José de Palau y de Huguet was a scholar and writer.

== Jurist and other engagements ==
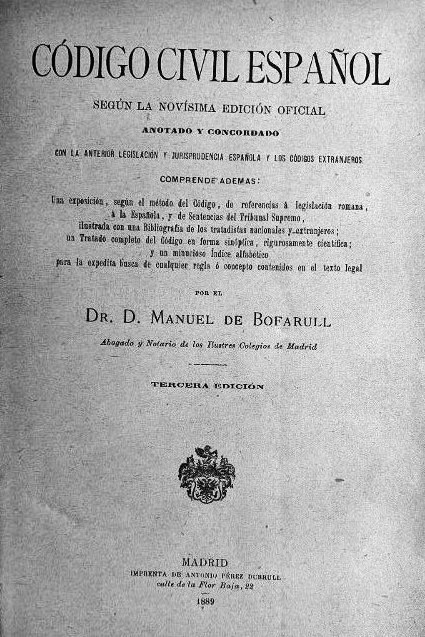
Codigo civil by Bofarull

Initially it appeared that Bofarull would opt for a scientific or academic career, as during 10 years after obtaining his doctorado he published two major juridical works. The first one, originally titled Tratado completo del Derecho romano en cuadros sinópticos, según el orden general de la Instituta (1878), was a structured reference book presenting terms and concepts of the Roman law. In its re-worked version it was prized at Exposición Universal in Barcelona in 1888 and was admitted as manual for university students. Similar in format was La Codificación Civil en España (1887, also prized), re-issued as El Código Civil Español según la edición oficial. Anotado y concordado con la anterior legislación y jurisprudencia española y los códigos extranjeros (1888); 150 years later it would be declared "culturally important" as "part of the knowledge base of civilization" and re-printed (2023). Apéndice al Código Civil español followed (1889). There were, however, no other similar works written and except technical La crisis del Notariado y las Cámaras de Contratación inmobiliaria (1908) Bofarull published no other major study. He basked in prestige: prior to 1878 he entered Real Academia de Jurisprudencia y Legislación, took part in national congresses, and formed part of Tribunales de Oposiciones, assessing candidates for university teaching positions in Roman law. He practiced as notary until 1925.

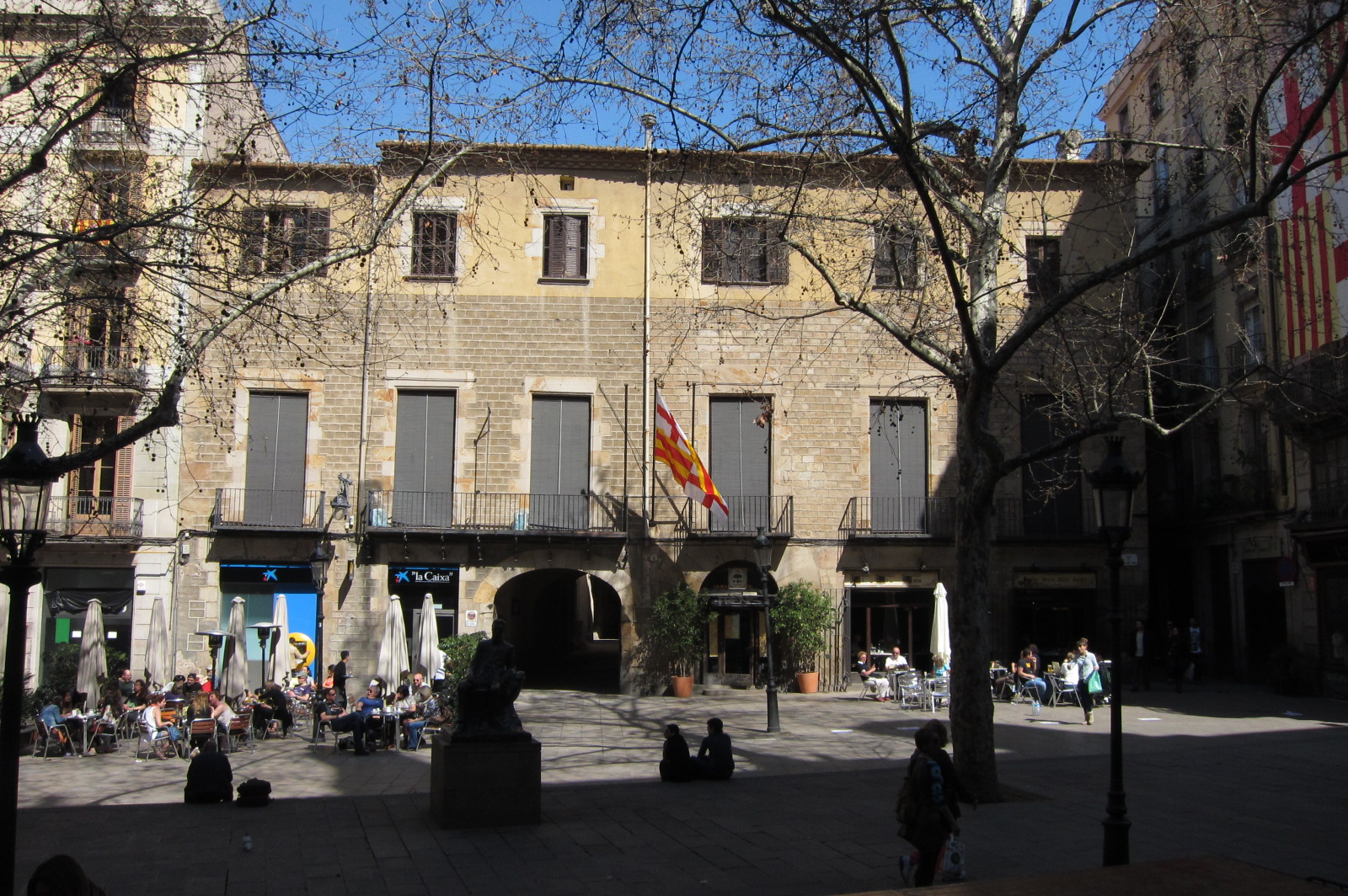
Instituto Agricolá Catalán de San Isidro

Bofarull was member of numerous corporate organizations, which chiefly fall into two groups. One was related to agriculture: Instituto Agricolá Catalán de San Isidro, Sociedad Económica de Amigos del País, Real Sociedad Económica Gerundense, Federación Agrícola Catalana Balear, Sindicatos Agrícolas de la Provincia de Gerona, and Asamblea General de la Propiedad y Agraria. The other one was about property management: Cámara de Propierdad Urbana de Cataluña, Federación Nacional de las Cámaras de la Propiedad (which he co-founded), and various provincial Cámaras de Propiedad in Catalonia. He cultivated his Catalan identity when in 1890 in Madrid he co-founded Centre Catalá, a Catalan cultural and business hub in the capital, and grew to its vice-presidency in the early 1900s. His minor Catalan engagements were related to local initiatives, like membership in Associació Artístich-Arqueològica Mataronesa. On the social front he was briefly busy in Instituto de Reformas Sociales, listed among "vocales representantes de la grande industria". He remained active in executive of lay Catholic organisations, like Patronato de Señoras de la Virgen de Montserrat and Congregación de Nuestra Señora de Montserrat (both in Madrid). There is some unclarity as to his role in ACNDP. Some sources claim that in 1909 a "Manuel Bofarull" was among co-founders of the ACNDP and wrote the statute of its publishing house, Editorial Católica, later to issue El Debate; however, the information is confusing and it appears that the person in question was rather his son. Confusion is related also to few other issues. In 1919-1920 he served as a consul of Turkey in Madrid.

== Parliamentary career ==
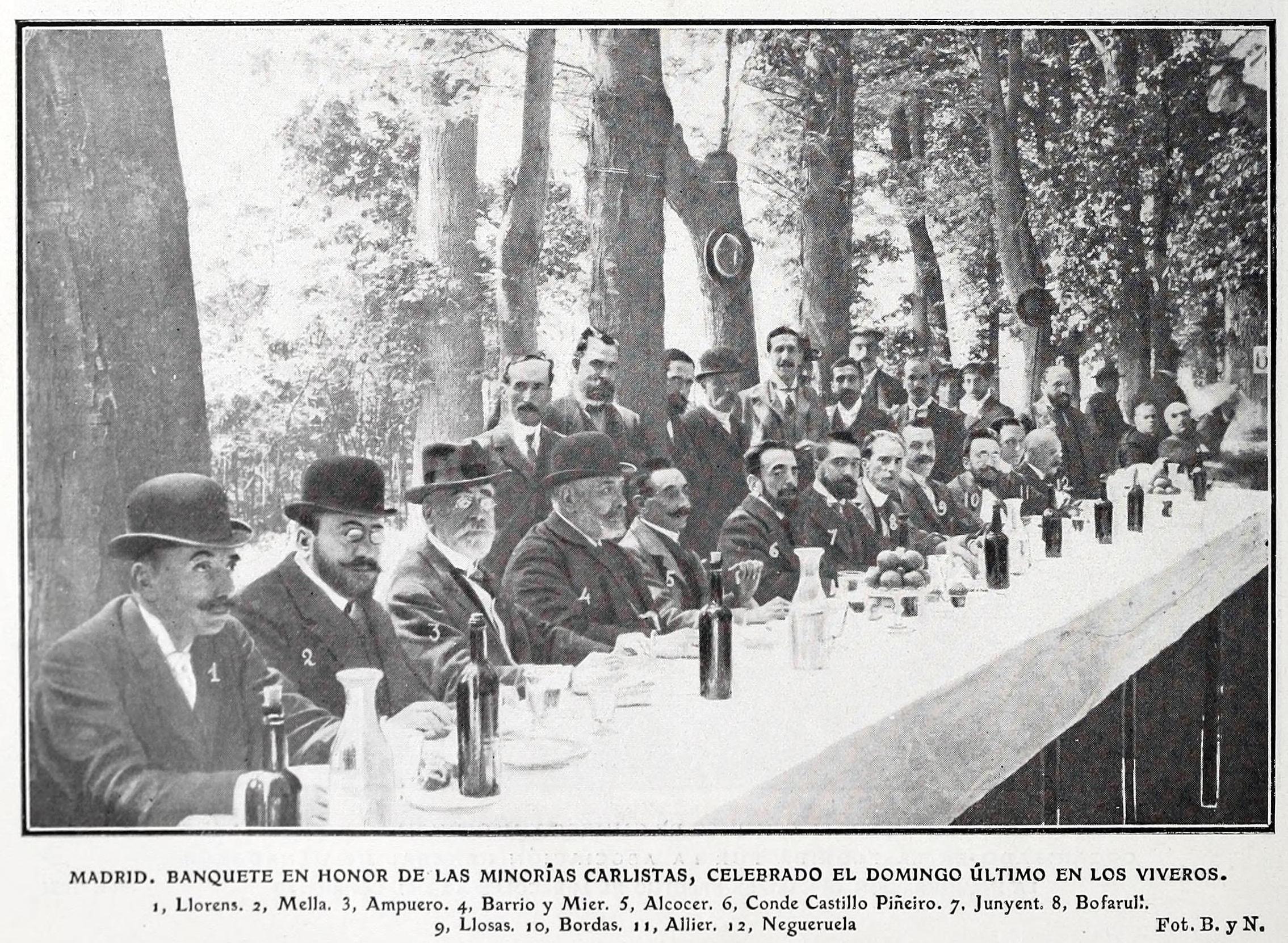
among Carlist MPs, 1907

Bofarull entered politics fairly late, when he was approaching 50 years of age; at the time he was already a well-established Madrid notary and active member of numerous Catalan cultural and business organizations. There is nothing known about either the motives or circumstances of his engagement into political matters. In late 1905, during propaganda campaign prior to general elections scheduled for December, he decided to run in Vilademúls, a Catalan district with which he had nothing to do. It is unclear what mechanism got him fielded there. He stood as an independent candidate, yet a Carlist periodical advertised him as "nuestro amigo", pointing to his religiosity and regionalist Catalan spirit. He was eventually fairly easily defeated by a canalejista candidate, Manuel Raventós Doménech.

In general elections of 1907 Bofarull again decided to run from Vilademúls, this time as a candidate of Solidaritat Catalana; during internal squabbling he gained the upper hand over Pere Rahola, who also aspired to this position. He was comfortably elected, having secured support of 4,606 out of 4,643 active voters. There is little known of his activity in Congreso de Diputados; the press of the era and the official Cortes service provide close to no information on his engagements. During the 1910 elections he stood in Vilademúls once more; this time, since Solidaritat has mostly disintegrated, as a Carlist candidate. He lost to Carlos Cusi de Miquelet. However, he re-calibrated his focus and few months later emerged as a candidate to the Senate from the Gerona province (of which Vilademúls formed part). In the press he appeared either as carlista or as católico. Bofarull was supported by 193 of the electors and obtained the ticket, becoming one of 10 Carlists who served in the Senate in 1903–1923. In the upper chamber he remained fairly active; his engagements were mostly about development of the road infrastructure (and, to a lesser extent, railways) in Catalonia, though at times also beyond. His term expired in 1912.

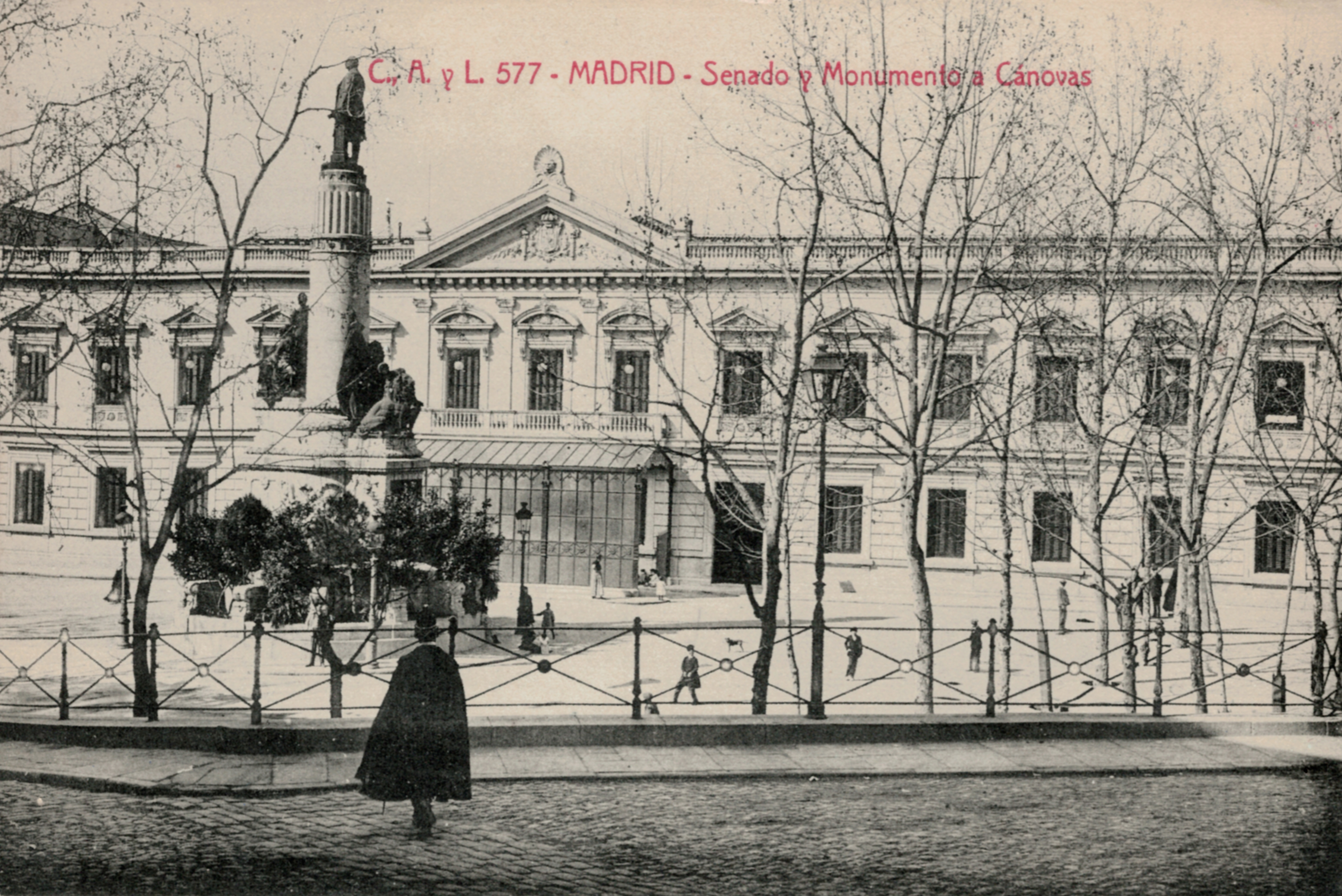
senate building, 1910s

Throughout some further 10 years to come Bofarull attempted to resume his career in the Cortes, either in the senate or in Congreso de los Diputados. In 1914 he was supposed to run for the lower chamber from Vilademúls and was even listed as one of the candidates, yet it is not clear whether he withdrew or was defeated. The same year he tried to re-enter the upper chamber, again from the Gerona province; during the backstage talks he did not secure enough support and his bid failed. His last known attempt is dated 1920, when Bofarull was listed as a governmental candidate endorsed by the conservative cabinet of Eduardo Dato; he was counted among candidates "procedientes del tradicionalismo y defensa social", again from Vilademúls. Nothing is furtherly known about this failed attempt.

== Carlist ==
Carlist standard

A scientific monographic work on Catalan Carlism of the late 19th-century does not indicate any Carlist family antecedents. Bofarull's father supported the Liberals, a common option among Catalan bourgeoisie of the mid-19th century. Hence, it is not clear in what circumstances Manuel approached Traditionalism. His earlier public engagements were rather marked by general Catholic flavor and Catalan spirit; in 1872 he co-founded Asociación de Católicos and Centro Obrero in Mataro, served as president of Juventud Católica of Mataró until the early 1880s and was among co-founders of the Madrid Centre Catalá in the 1890s. The first information pointing to his links with Carlism is dated 1905, when he was supported by Traditionalist press during his first bid for the Cortes. It is also known that he used to publish articles in a Carlist periodical El Diario de Mataró y su Comarca, yet neither the timing nor the scale of his contributions are known.

Having joined Carlist ranks and as resident in Madrid, he was member of Círculo Tradicionalista in the capital. In 1908 he rose to president of this body and held the position at least until 1909. In 1910 he grew to vice-president of Junta Regional Carlista of Castilla la Nueva, the regional party executive (Madrid formed part of New Castile), though nothing is known of his membership in the provincial Madrid command layer. In 1912 he made one more step up the ladder, when the claimant Jaime III appointed the new national executive, a 25-member Junta Nacional Tradicionalista. It was composed mostly of regional leaders and Cortes members; it was Bofarull's senator ticket which earned him the nomination. In 1913 and together with Pascual Comín and Cipriano Rodríguez Monte he formed part of one of its 10 specialized committees; as expert lawyer he was nominated to "Comisión de defensa jurídica de los Legitimistas que sufran persecución por delitos políticos".

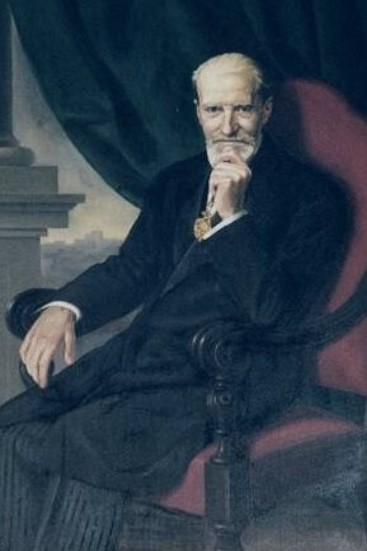
late portrait

It is not clear when Bofarull's term in Junta Nacional terminated and whether upon expiry of his senate ticket he lost his place in the national executive; no historiographic work mentions his membership from 1914 onwards. During the Great War Carlism got increasingly fragmented over numerous issues; one of them was position towards the warring sides, as the claimant sympathized with Entente while most heavyweights, including the chief theorist Juan Vázquez de Mella, technically opted for neutrality, while in fact siding with Germany. Bofarull appeared to have been among the latter; in 1915 he subscribed to La Amistad Hispanogermana and co-signed a manifesto which called for neutrality. He was not among protagonists of the internal strife and none of the sources indicates whether in 1919, when the conflict climaxed in open showdown, he joined the rebellious Mellistas; his son did. There is no information on his Carlist engagements later on. A contemporary scholar counts him among 20-odd "elit política del carlisme català" but claims also that "si parlem amb rigor, no es tractava d’un dirigent del carlisme català", referring to his scarce activity in the party ranks.

== See also ==
- Carlism
- Traditionalism (Spain)
- Electoral Carlism (Restoration)
- Civil Code of Spain

== Footnotes ==
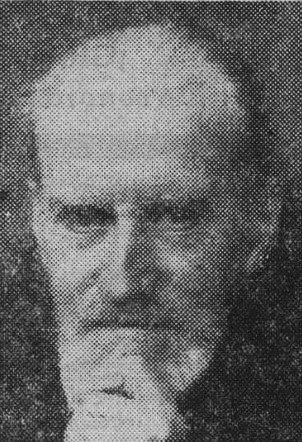
late photo
