= Les Santes =

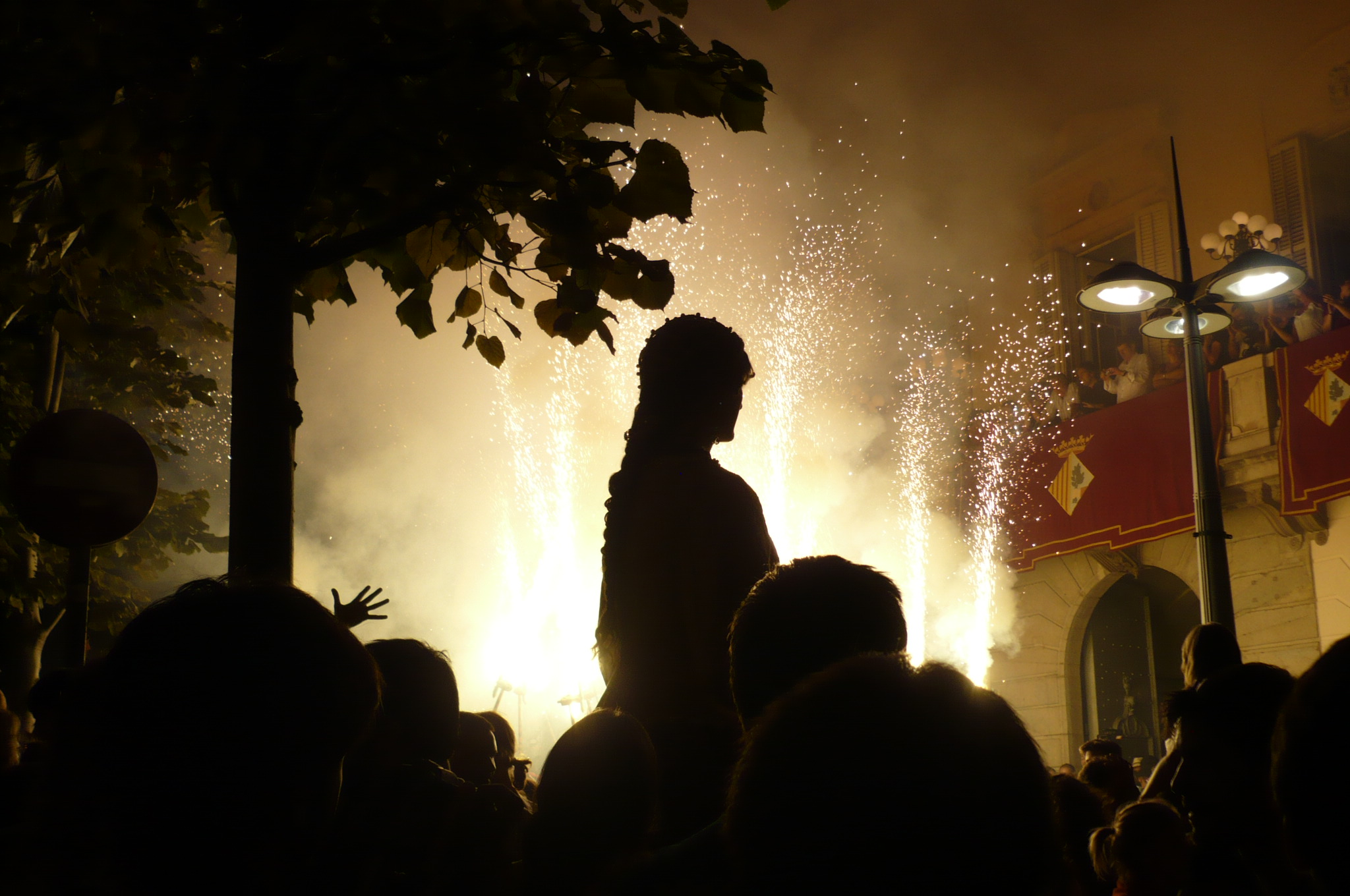
Photo of one of the "gegants" at a correfoc

Les Santes is the largest festival in the city of Mataró, Spain. It is celebrated every year from the 25th to the 29th of July. The festivities include comedy shows, live music, fireworks and typical features present in catalan festivals, such as correfocs and "gegants" (meaning gigants).

In 2010 it obtained the recognition of "Heritage Festival of National Interest" by the Government of Catalonia.
