= David Mauchan =

Scottish footballer

Personal information
- Full name: David Mauchan
- Date of birth: 1895
- Place of birth: Nottingham, England
- Date of death: Unknown

Senior career*
Years	Team	Apps	(Gls)
1912–1915	CE Júpiter		
- * Club domestic league appearances and goals

David Mauchan (1895 – Unknown) was an English-born Scottish footballer who founded the Catalan club CE Júpiter in 1909. His older brother Peter played for FC Barcelona at the turn of the century, when David was still a child, but due to a mistake that has persisted through time, David is often wrongly credited with being the one who played for Barça.

== Early life ==
David Mauchan was born in Nottingham in 1895, as the son of William Mauchan, a football referee from Glasgow who had moved to Nottingham due to his textile profession, and Elizabeth Stewart. He was the fifth of six children, including four older siblings, Peter (1882–1943), Archibaldo (1884–1937), Elizabeth (1887–1921), and John (1889–1976), and one younger brother, William (1897–1976).

His father was one of many workers at lace manufacturers Johnston, Shields & Co in Newmilns sent over to work in the company's newly opened factory in Sant Martí de Provençals (known as La Escocesa), a neighborhood in Barcelona, and thus, the family moved to Sant Martí. Thanks to his father, Mauchan became an employee of Johnston, Shields & Co in the late 1900s, and eventually, he began working alongside his older brother John at Fabra i Coats, one of the textile factories in the neighborhood of Poblenou.

== Football career ==
On 12 May 1909, the 14-year-old David and his older brother John founded CE Júpiter at the Cebrián brewery, in the heart of the working-class Poblenou. The club was born from a merger of two small amateur clubs in the neighborhood, Anglo-Español and Stadium Nacional, and its name was chosen because of a contest that was held that afternoon on Playa Mar Bella. The club's board was subsequently elected, and David was appointed as its first treasurer.

According to news published in the press, G. Mauchan was called "head of material" in November 1911, and months later, in June 1912, when Júpiter joined the Catalan Football Federation, Archibaldo Mauchan was called a member of its football commission. Although the initial G does not suit anyone from the Mauchan family of that time, it probably corresponds to David's younger brother William, whose Spanish name is Guillermo. John, David, and William all played for Jupiter between 1912 and 1915, and all three of them even lined up together once, on 21 September 1913, helping their side to a 4–0 victory over FC Gladiator. On 8 December 1912, in a match for the benefit of the Union of Journalists between the Catalan national team and foreign players, a Mauchan played as a goalkeeper with the foreign team as a last-minute replacement to John Hamilton who could not due to illness of a family member; the foreign team lost 2–5.

Almost as soon as it was founded, Júpiter became a club fully identified with the working-class of its neighborhood and, therefore, it quickly gathered in its ranks workers linked to anarchist trade unionism, who devoted part of their free time to playing football in the field of the Camp de la Bota, which hosted the first matches of Júpiter. Notably, Júpiter was the first team in Spain whose field was installed with artificial lighting, which allowed matches to be played at night. The club still exists to this day in the lower leagues, being one of the oldest teams in the city.

== Later and personal life ==
His older brother Peter was the first to return to the United Kingdom (before 1909), while the rest of the family only returned to the UK at the beginning of the First World War in 1914, except for John. David enlisted in the Royal Army in 1914, going into combat in France on 17 January 1915.

Mauchan married Phyllis Mary Cooke in 1942, but the couple had no children.
