= Roca dels Bous =

Archaeological site in northern Spain

- Bull's Rock
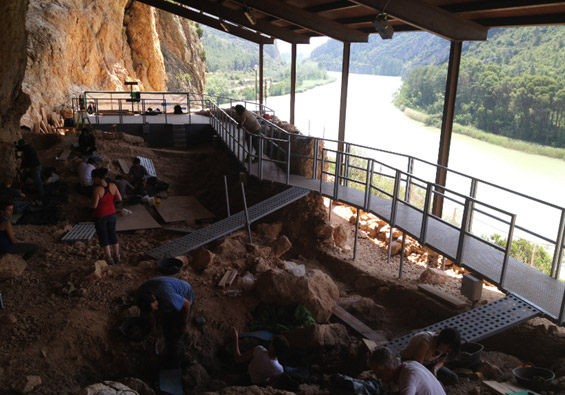

- Roca dels Bous in Spain Roca dels Bous (Spain)
- 41.873565°N 0.844551°E
- Periods: Middle Paleolithic
- Associated with: Neanderthals
- Location: Sant Llorenç de Montgai, Noguera county
- Region: Province of Lleida Catalonia, Spain

Site notes
- Height: 286 m (938 ft)
- Website: Roca dels Bous

Roca dels Bous (Catalan: "Bull's Rock") is an archaeological site located in Sant Llorenç de Montgai, in the Catalan Pyrenees, Spain. Since 1988 the Autonomous University of Barcelona and the UCL Institute of Archaeology study and record the fossil sequence of southern European Neanderthals who inhabited the area during the Middle Paleolithic approximately 50,000 years ago. The excavation team utilizes a worldwide unique digital system and various innovative technologies that significantly improve the quality of the classification of the recovered objects. Roca dels Bous has as one of the first Paleolithic excavation sites in Spain established a visitor centre, that focuses on displaying the Prehistory research of the prepyrenees area.

The site was declared a Cultural Asset of National Interest in 2015.

== History of the region ==
The sequence of radiocarbon dates suggests that Neanderthals survived longer in the Iberian Peninsula, where a small group had retreated well after the arrival of modern humans in the rest of Europe. Neanderthal presence after 30,000 BP at archaeological sites in the Western Mediterranean and Portugal has been confirmed. Around 40,000 BP, a new techno-economical – and possibly social – tradition different from the Neanderthal Mousterian culture had emerged in the north of the Iberian Peninsula. This culture has been associated with anatomically modern humans, who, have arrived in Europe via the Eastern Mediterranean and quickly spread throughout the continent.

== History of the project ==
The site is located 6 mi (9.66 km) north of the city of Balaguer, Province of Lleida in northeast Spain, above the river Segre at a height of 286 m (938.32 ft) in the Pyrenees foothills.

The principal aim of the project is to study the population organisation of the late Middle Paleolithic, the critical factors that drove Neanderthals to extinction and a possible Neanderthal - modern human interaction.

In a letter in 1973, Emili Sunyer acknowledges the Mousterian sequence present in the slopes of the Pyrenees of Lleida. Excavation probes yielded especially flint and quartzite artifacts typical of Middle Paleolithic Neanderthals. In the excavation sequence, that reached a depth of 1.5 m (4.92 ft), bones from various animals of different ecosystems that were part of the diet of Neanderthal groups were found. Fossils of woodland (red deer), grasslands (wild horses) and rock dwellers (wild goats) are documented, which implies that Roca dels Bous might have been or have been part of an ecotone.

The small number of artifacts and animal remains and the absence of continuous hearth layers suggests that Roca dels Bous served as a temporary shelter for small groups of hunters, rather than as a permanent settlement. The focus of research has shifted to how much of Neanderthal mobility depended on the migration patterns of their prey. However, the site's central location was emphasized in a 2014 publication, as it allows an effective control of the seasonal animal movements, especially equids (horse and wild ass) and deer, between the Ebro Depression and the Pyrenees.

== Research ==
Research work began in 1988. This wide period of time has contributed to achieve a high level of knowledge about this important moment in the history. Currently, the European Union contributed to its development as a museum, together with special infrastructure construction uncommon in other prehistoric sites. Roca dels Bous forms part of the European project POCTEFA, a partnership between the countries of Spain, France and Andorra. Its aim is to provide highly valuable information about the Neanderthal occupation in this area and reasons that drove them to their sudden disappearance.

== ICT and museumization ==
A digital environment has been designed for the study of Roca dels Bous. The system utilizes spatial and contextual information and intervenes parallel and directly in the recovery and documentation process. Advantages are, for example, exact hypothese creation, which can only be derived based on the excavation data and the detection of faulty interpretation of the archaeological record.

Roca dels Bous is the first archaeological site in Spain that features an interactive museum and exhibition, that are part of the Archaeological Park of Sant Llorenç de Montgaian. Visitors can take interactive tours through photos, drawings, videos, maps and 3D applications. Via laser triangulation, the archaeologist can log the exact location of the findings.

Otherwise, research teams use an innovative digital system, which allows classifying the pieces found. They incorporated Data Matrix codes to the fieldwork and use of PDA. This novelty reduces the error rate (from 40% to 1%) and the labeling time in half. This methodology is starting to be adapted to other archaeological projects across Europe.

== Bibliography ==
- de la Torre, I., J. Martínez-Moreno and R. Mora (2012). When bones are not enough: Lithic refits and occupation dynamics in the Middle Palaeolithic level 10 of Roca dels Bous (Catalunya, Spain). Bones for tools - tools for bones. The interplay between objects and objectives. K. Seetah and B. Gravina. Cambridge, McDonald Institute for Archaeological Research: 9–19.
- Martínez-Moreno, J., P. González Marcén and R. Mora Torcal (2011). "Data matrix (DM) codes: A technological process for the management of the archaeological record." Journal of Cultural Heritage 12(2): 134–139.
- Martínez-Moreno, J., I. de la Torre, R. Mora and j. Casanova (2010). Technical variability and changes in the pattern of settlement at Roca dels Bous (southeastern Pre-Pyrenees, Spain). Settlement dynamics on the Middle Paleolithic and Middle Stone Age. N. J. Conard and A. Delagnes. Tübingen, Kerns Verlag. III: 485–507.
- Martínez-Moreno, J., R. Mora, P. González Marcén, S. Vega Bolívar, J. Pizarro, J. Casanova and X. Roda (2010). L'aparició de l'homo sapiens al Prepirineu oriental. Reconstruint els darrers 50.000 anys de poblament humà als Pirineus. 2n col.loqui d'Arqueologia d'Odèn. Home i Territori. Darreres investigacions al Prepirineu Lleidatà 2006–2008. Òdèn, MuseuDiocesà i Comarcal de Solsona: 11–28.
- Benito-Calvo, A., J. Martínez-Moreno, J. F. Jordá Pardo, I. de la Torre and R. M. Torcal (2009). "Sedimentological and archaeological fabrics in Palaeolithic levels of the South-Eastern Pyrenees: Cova Gran and Roca dels Bous Sites (Lleida, Spain)." Journal of Archaeological Science 36(11): 2566–2577.
- Mora, R., J. Martínez-Moreno and J. Casanova (2008). "Abordando la noción de "variabilidad musteriense" en Roca dels Bous (Prepirineo suroriental, Lleida)." Trabajos de Prehistoria 65(2): 13-28.
- Martínez-Moreno, J., R. Mora, J. Casanova and I. de la Torre (2007). "La Roca dels Bous: sur les pas des Néandertaliens du sud des Pyrénées." Bulleltin de l'Association Archéologique des Pyrénées-Orientales(22): 47–55.
- Martínez-Moreno, J., R. Mora, I. d. l. Torre and J. Casanova (2006). "La Roca dels Bous en el contexto del Paleolítico Medio final del Noreste de la Península Ibérica." Zona Arqueológica 7: 252–263.
- Mora, R., I. d. l. Torre and J. Martínez Moreno (2004). Middle Palaeolithic Mobility and Land Use in the Southwestern Pyrenees: The Example of Level 10 in La Roca dels Bous (Noguera, Catalunya, Northeast Spain). Settlement Dynamics of the Middle Palaeolithic and Middle Stone Age. N. J. Conard. Tübingen, Kerns Verlag. II: 415–435.
- Mora, R.; de la Torre, I. y Martínez-Moreno, J. 2004. “Middle Palaeolithic mobility and land use in the Southwestern Pryrenees: The example of Level 10 in La Roca dels Bous (Noguera, Catalunya, Northeast Spain)”. En: Conard, N. J. (ed.), Settlement Dynamics on the Middle Paleolithic and Middle Stone Age. Tübingen, Kerns Verlag. 2: 415-435
