= Hermitage of St. Simon =

Church in Mataro, Spain

Coordinates: 41.5418°N 2.45726°E

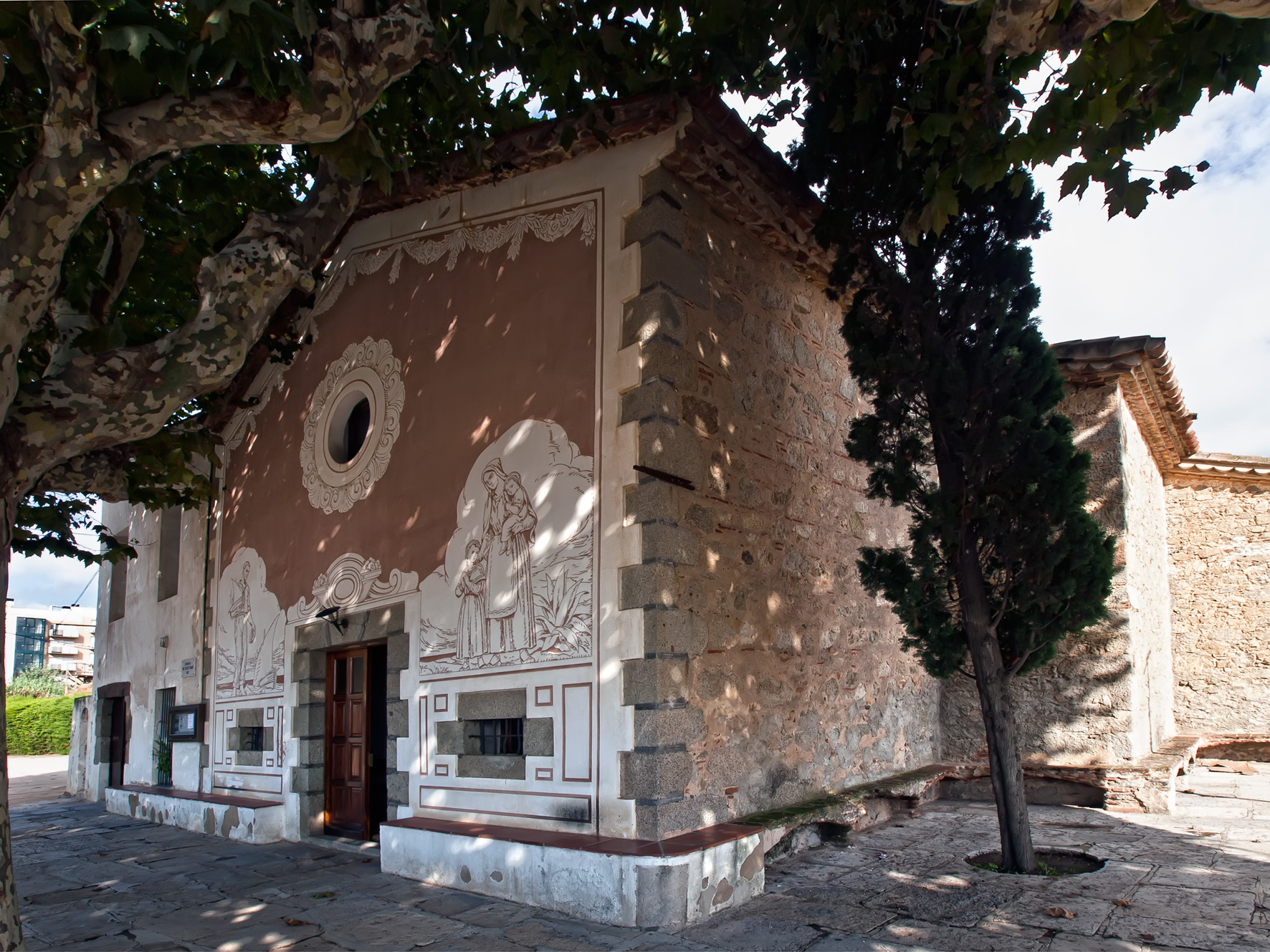
Ermita de Sant Simó

Hermitage of St. Simon (Ermita de Sant Simó) is a small Spanish parish church located in the east end of the Royal Road, in the faubourg of Havana, in the municipality of Mataró, comarca of Maresme. Dating to 1611, the seaside chapel is well-known along the Catalonia coast. It has a single nave in keeping with ancient seafaring tradition. The Feast Day is 28 October.

== Bibliography ==
- Bradshaw (1865). Bradshaw's illustrated hand-book to Spain and Portugal (Public domain ed.).
