= Casa Coll i Regàs =

Modernist building in Barcelona, Spain

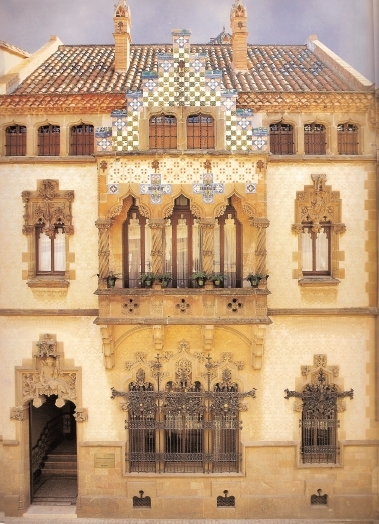

The Coll i Regàs house is a townhouse in the Modernisme style designed by the Catalan architect Josep Puig i Cadafalch for Joaquim Coll i Regas in 1898, in Mataró near Barcelona. The house was declared a historical monument in 2000. Today, it is owned by the Fundació Iluro of Mataró.

== Context ==
Modernism is the European cultural trend that marks the end of the 19th and the early 20th century. It includes all the arts and, at the same time, represents a way of life. Combining the great Catalan building tradition with sculpture, fine crafts and applied arts, in addition to using iron as a new structural element. The symbolism of plant motifs, asymmetry and movement, characterize the design and decor. Modernism in Mataró has the name of the architect Josep Puig i Cadafalch, the main protagonist of modernist architectural projects in the city and most of the civic, cultural and political events of the time. For all of this, it is possible that Joaquim Coll i Regàs commissioned the project for his home, now a symbol of the city.

== Description ==
On 12 May 1897, he asked the City of Mataró for permission to renovate the houses no. 55 and 57 in Argentona Street completely. The reform plans follow the tradition of the urban bourgeoisie of Mataró, and in this way it is the only manor built, in the city, in the modernist era. The street facade of neo pace, joined the socket, the portal, the great tribune of the ground floor, and all the windows were built with stone from Montjuïc, sculpted by Eusebi Arnau (Barcelona 1864-1934), Josep Puig i Cadafalch’s friend and constant collaborator. "The spinner" that crowns and completes the entry portal is today a symbol of the city of Mataró. The façade is finished with a sgraffito decorated tiles and tiling, highlighting especially the large pediment on the rostrum. Catalan eaves crown the building. The bars of the windows on the ground floor, possibly wrought in Barcelona, in the workshops of Manuel Ballarín, a regular contributor to Josep Puig i Cadafalch, incorporate pieces of knitwear machinery motifs. Josep Puig i Cadafalch was well aware he was building a house for a textile manufacturer. Therefore, everywhere, in sgraffito, leaded glass tile introduced flowers emblems, which we have to assume are cotton flower and sprocket textile machinery.
