= Mataró =

- Municipality
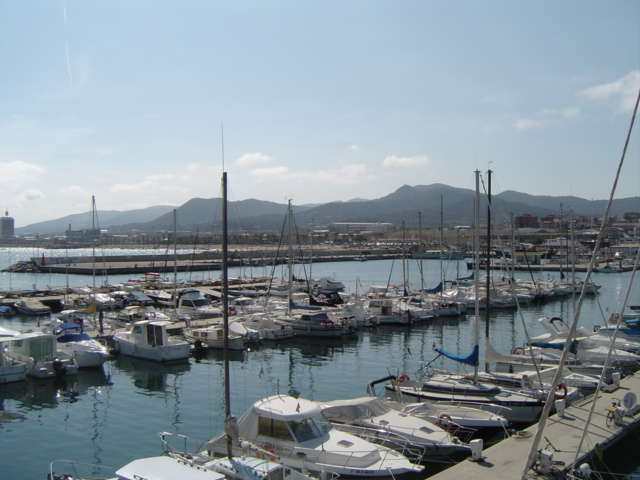
- Port of Mataró

- Flag Coat of arms

- Location in Maresme county
- Interactive map of Mataró
- Location within Catalonia Location within Spain
- Coordinates: 41°32′N 2°27′E
- Country: Spain
- Autonomous Community: Catalonia
- Region: Barcelona
- County: Maresme
- Province: Barcelona

Government
  - Mayor: David Boté Paz (2015) (PSC)

Area
  - Total: 22.5 km^{2} (8.7 sq mi)
- Elevation: 28 m (92 ft)

Population (2025-01-01)
  - Total: 131,683
  - Density: 5,850/km^{2} (15,200/sq mi)
- Demonym: Mataroní
- Postal code: 08301-08304
- Website: mataro.cat

Mataró (Catalan pronunciation: [mətəˈɾo]) is the capital and largest town of the Maresme county in Catalonia, Spain. It is on the Maresme coast, south of Costa Brava, between Cabrera de Mar and Sant Andreu de Llavaneres, 30 kilometres (19 miles) northeast of Barcelona. As of 2021, it had a population of 129,749.

== History ==
Mataró dates back to Roman times when it was a village known as "Iluro" or "Illuro". The ruins of a first-century BC Roman bath house (known locally as the Torre Llauder) were discovered and can be visited. The coastal N-II highway follows the same path as the original Roman road, Via Augusta.

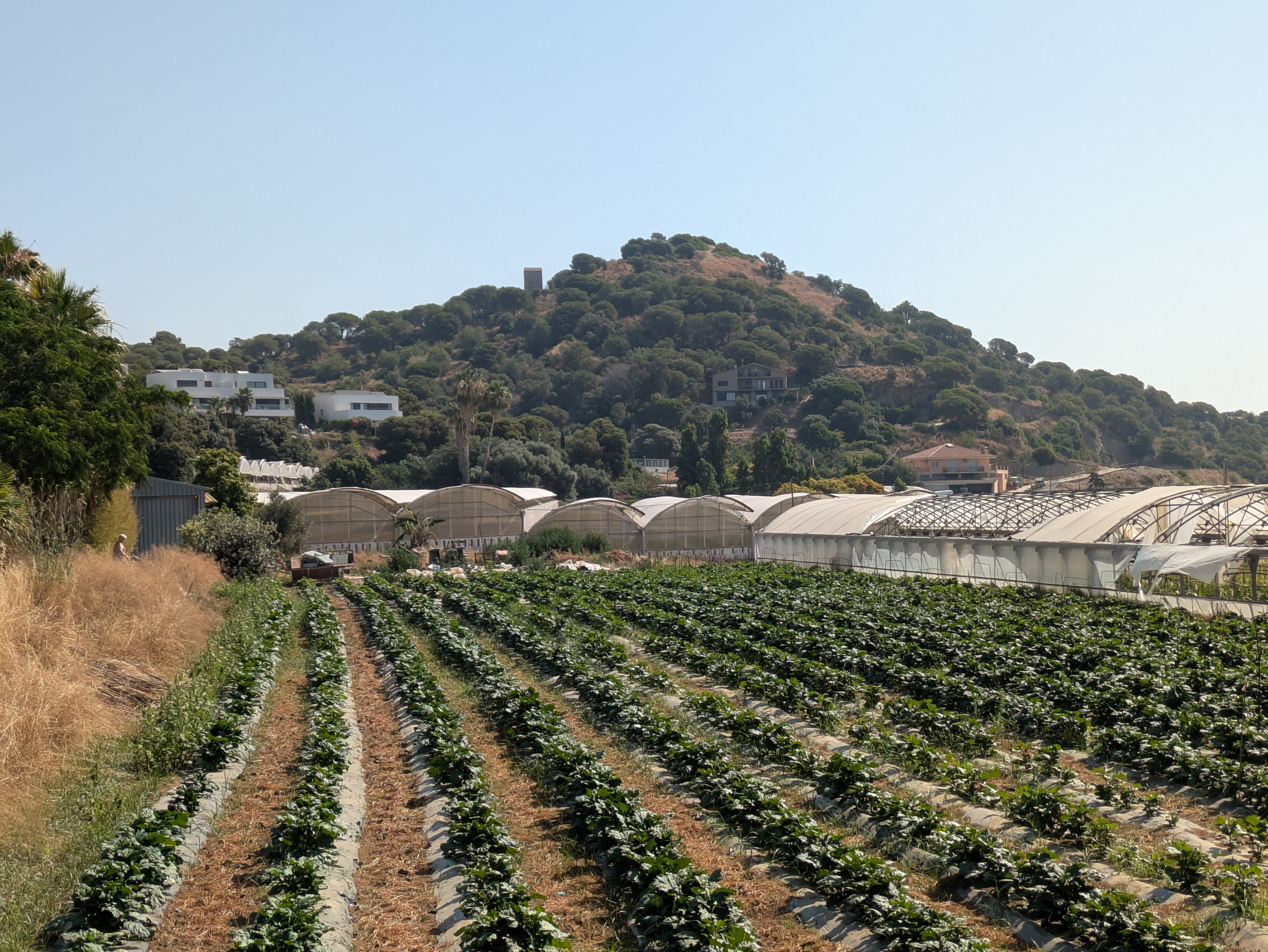
The Turó d'Onofre Arnau, an isolated hill which rises to an altitude of 131 metres and which is located close to Mataró. An eleventh-century fortification on the summit of this hill - the "Castell de Mata" - may have given its name to that of Mataró. The castle has since disappeared almost completely. The hill overlooks fields and greenhouses where fruit and vegetables are cultivated.

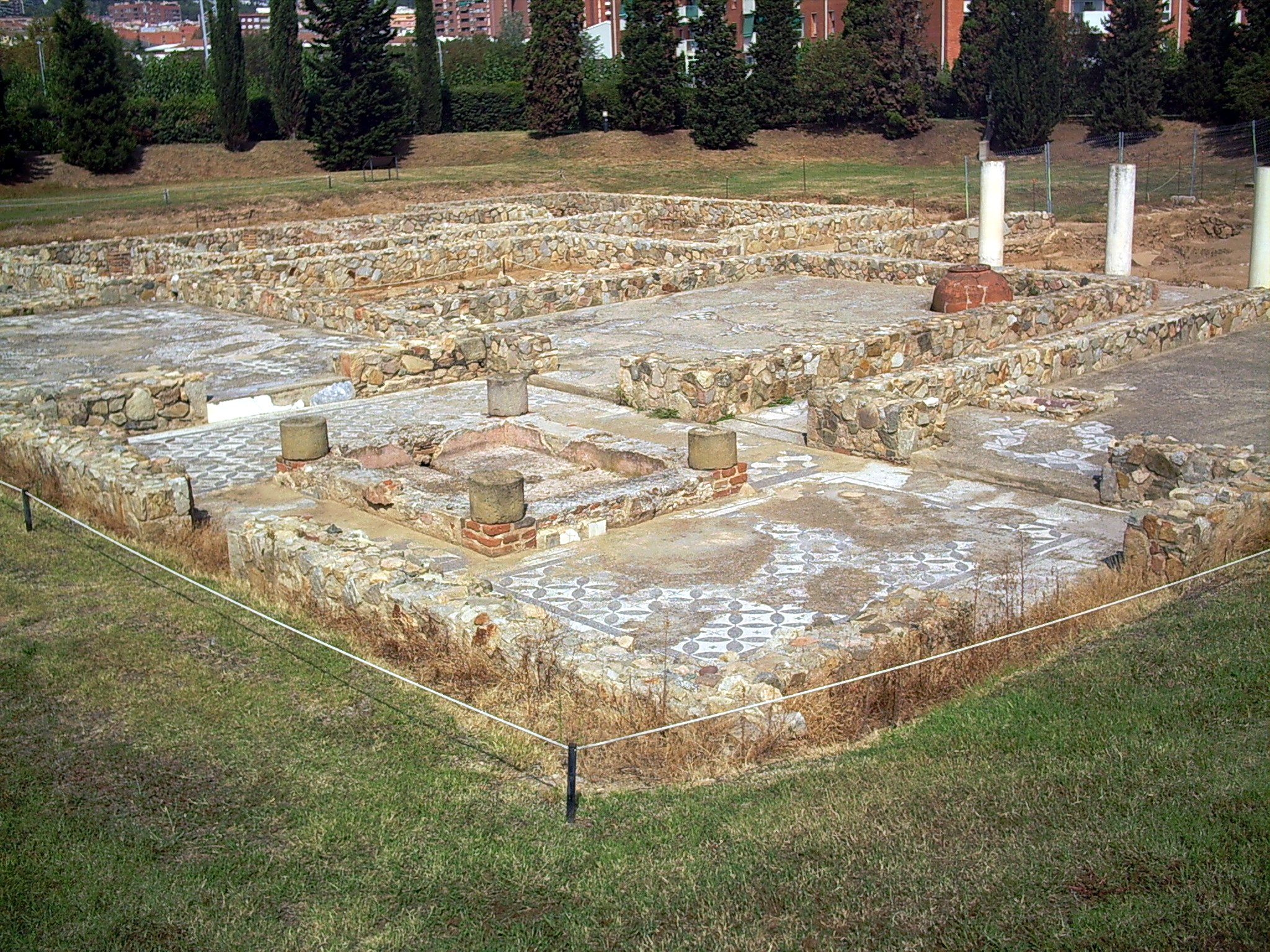
Roman villa of Can Llauder.

Mataró was declared a city by royal decree, even though at the time (the nineteenth century) the population fell short of the requirement for city status.

The first railway in peninsular Spain was the Mataró – Barcelona line which opened on 28 October 1848 by the Catalan businessman and Mataró native Miquel Biada. This line now forms part of the Renfe/Rodalies de Catalunya R1 suburban service between L'Hospitalet de Llobregat and Maçanet-Massanes. Mataró is also connected with Barcelona and Girona by the C-32 autopista (freeway) and with Granollers by the C-60 autopista.

During the 1992 Summer Olympics in Barcelona, Mataró was the starting point for the marathon events.

== Main sights ==
Mataró is the birthplace of the noucentista architect Josep Puig i Cadafalch, who designed the ajuntament (town hall) and several other notable buildings in the town:

- Casa Coll i Regàs.
- Casa Parera
- Casa Sisternes
- El Rengle
- Hermitage of St. Simon
- La Beneficiència
- Mataró City Wall (built between 1569 and 1600 and designed by the military engineer Jorge de Setara. It supposedly follows, to a large extent, the line of the old Roman wall. It was built with small stones bound with lime mortar. The Mataró City Wall had seven large gates, as well as attached towers that gave it greater defence. During the 19th century, many sections of the old Mataró City Wall were demolished.)

Near the town are the archaeological remains of the Roman villa of Can Llauder.

== Agriculture ==
The traditional vineyards were devastated by Phylloxera in the 19th century and only partially replanted, due to the growth of the tourist industry and the development of irrigation. Potatoes were one of the first replacement crops to be introduced, especially the Royal Kidney variety, and Mataró obtained a Denominació d'Origen in 1932. Trocadero lettuce and peas are also grown, mostly for export. The production of cut flowers is less important than in other towns of the Maresme. Irrigated land made up 9.13 square kilometres (3.53 sq mi) of the 10.57 square kilometres (4.08 sq mi) of agricultural land in the municipality in 1986 (47% of the municipal territory).

In modern viticulture, the red mourvèdre grape variety is a better-known synonym for the grape known in Spain, the U.S., and Australia as mataro. Mataró, the city, is thought to be the likely origin of mataro, the grape.

== Climate ==
Mataró has a borderline humid subtropical climate (Cfa in Köppen climate classification) bordering with a Hot-summer mediterranean climate, (Köppen Csa).

Climate data for Mataró (data from 1931 to 1969)
Month	Jan	Feb	Mar	Apr	May	Jun	Jul	Aug	Sep	Oct	Nov	Dec	Year
Mean daily maximum °C (°F)	14.0 (57.2)	13.7 (56.7)	15.8 (60.4)	17.2 (63.0)	20.3 (68.5)	24.0 (75.2)	26.8 (80.2)	27.3 (81.1)	25.1 (77.2)	21.6 (70.9)	16.9 (62.4)	13.8 (56.8)	19.7 (67.5)
Daily mean °C (°F)	10.3 (50.5)	10.2 (50.4)	12.3 (54.1)	14.0 (57.2)	16.9 (62.4)	20.7 (69.3)	23.5 (74.3)	23.9 (75.0)	21.7 (71.1)	18.0 (64.4)	13.6 (56.5)	10.6 (51.1)	16.3 (61.3)
Mean daily minimum °C (°F)	6.7 (44.1)	6.7 (44.1)	8.9 (48.0)	10.7 (51.3)	13.5 (56.3)	17.3 (63.1)	20.2 (68.4)	20.4 (68.7)	18.2 (64.8)	14.5 (58.1)	10.4 (50.7)	7.4 (45.3)	12.9 (55.2)
Average precipitation mm (inches)	33 (1.3)	53 (2.1)	50 (2.0)	45 (1.8)	66 (2.6)	42 (1.7)	27 (1.1)	33 (1.3)	56 (2.2)	91 (3.6)	74 (2.9)	35 (1.4)	605 (24)
Source: Sistema de Clasificación Bioclimática Mundial

== Festivals, celebrations and events ==
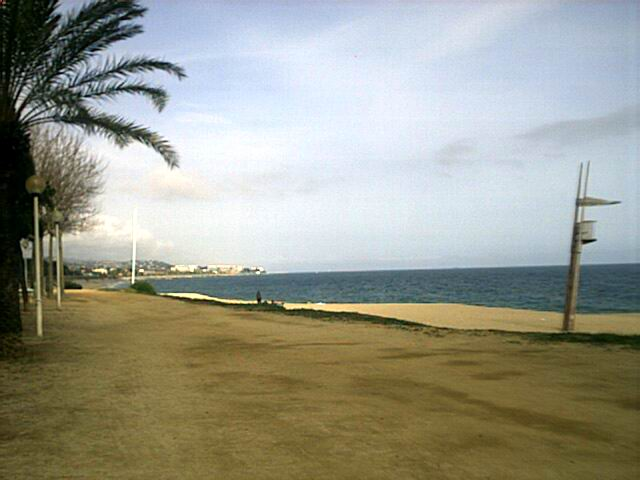
The beach

Several major events are celebrated annually in Mataró. Some of them are also celebrated in the rest of Catalonia and others, which have a religious origin, are part of the folklore and traditions of Spain and some other countries. Among all of them the most popular ones are:

- The three wise men in Mataró.
- Carnival in Mataró: celebrated immediately before Lent.
- Easter in Mataró: celebrated every year during one week on a movable date from the end of March to the very beginning of May
- Saint George in Mataró: celebrated on 23 April. It is a big celebration although it is not a bank holiday.
- St. John the Baptist in Mataró: celebrated on 24 June
- Les Santes: local festivity of the city celebrated at the end of July. It involves the recognition of Saint Juliana and Saint Semproniana.
- The caga Tió: celebrated in Catalonia on Christmas' Eve, 24 December.
- Mataró also celebrates several fairs such as: Tres Tombs and Saint Ponç. In May it is celebrated a fair called Mercat de Sant Ponç. At the fair handicraft products, medicinal herbs, natural products like: honey, cheese, fruits, flowers, jam and salami are sold. Sant Ponç is the patron saint of the herbalists and bee keepers. The fair has been done for centuries. Its origins date to the 16th century, when in Spring herbalists took medicine to the sick. Today Sant Ponç fair is celebrated to preserve the antique customs.
- Festival "Cultural Crossroad".
- International Dance Festival "Days of Dance".

== Twin towns ==
- Cehegín, Spain
- Dürnau, Germany
- Gammelshausen, Germany
- Créteil, France
- Corsico, Italy
- Fort Lauderdale, United States

== Notable people ==
- Miguel Biada (1789–1848), sea merchant and promoter of first Spanish train connection (Mataró-Barcelona)
- Manuel Bofarull Palau (1851-1929), Carlist politician
- Peret (1935–2014), musician
- Josep Puig i Cadafalch (1867–1956), Catalan Modernista architect
- Nacho Vidal (born 1973), pornographer
- Leila Ouahabi (born 1993), footballer for Gotham FC
- Marta Torrejón (born 1990), footballer for FC Barcelona
- Lamine Yamal (born 2007), footballer for FC Barcelona, Ballon d'Or Kopa Trophy winner (x2)

== See also ==
- Mataró Museum
- Roman villa of Can Llauder
- Can Marfà Knitwear Museum

== Bibliography ==
- Panareda Clopés, Josep Maria; Rios Calvet, Jaume; Rabella Vives, Josep Maria (1989). Guia de Catalunya, Barcelona: Caixa de Catalunya. ISBN 84-87135-01-3 (Spanish). ISBN 84-87135-02-1 (Catalan).
