= Roman villa of Can Llauder =

Cultural property in Mataró, Spain

Coordinates: 41°31′52.52″N 2°26′2.50″E

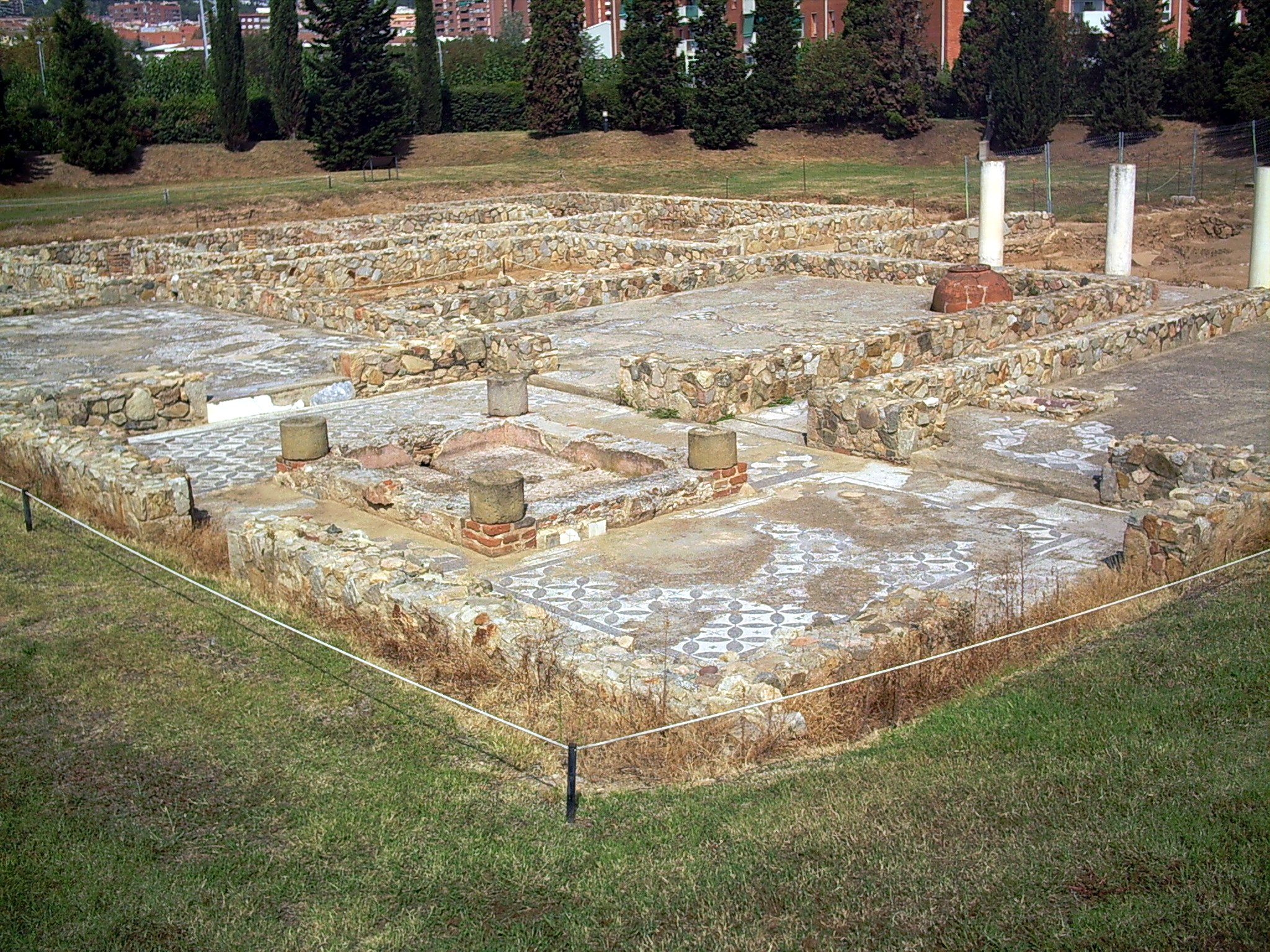
View of the villa remains.

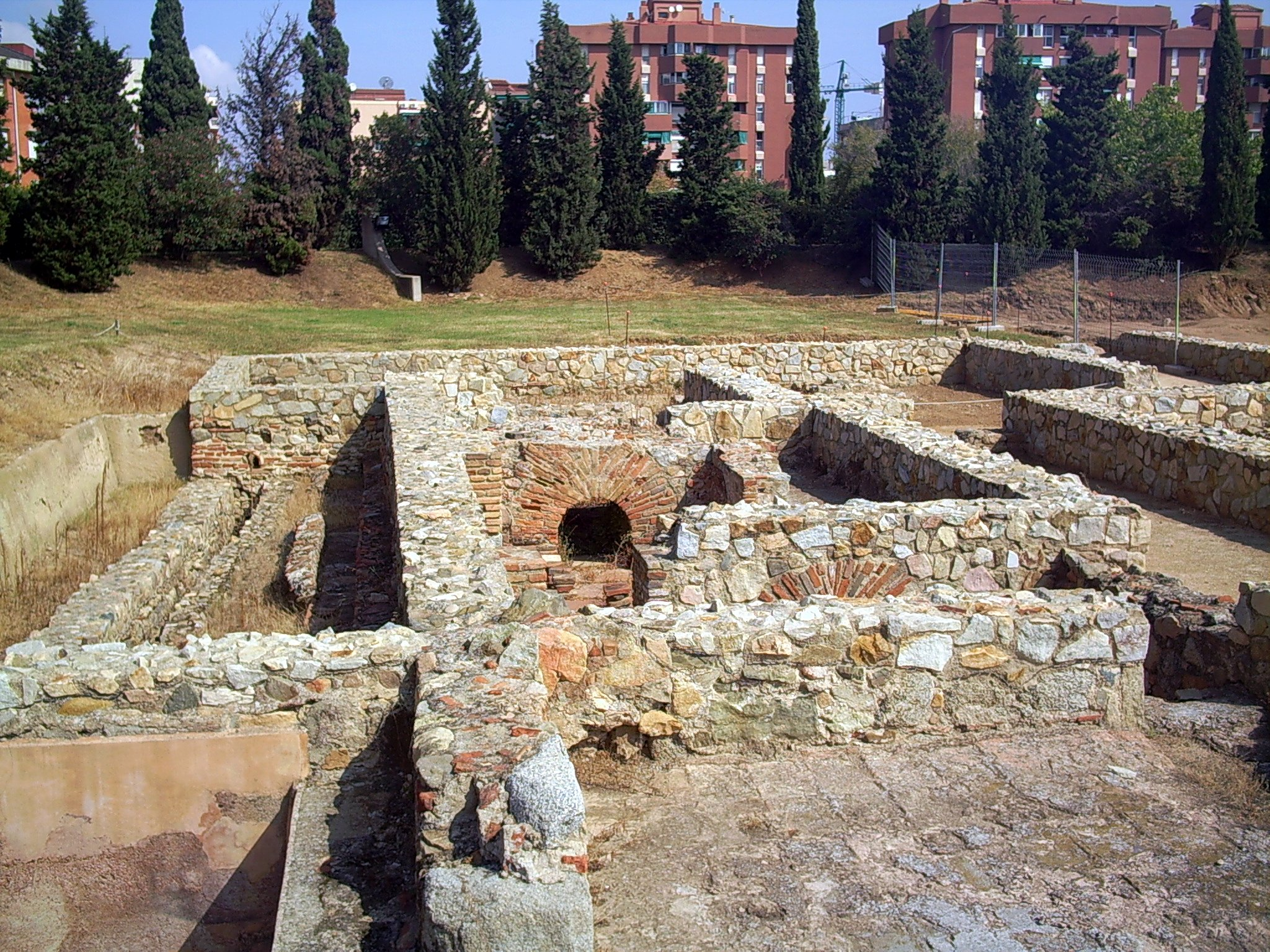
View of the calidarium.

The Roman villa of Can Llauder is a Roman site near Mataró, Barcelona, Catalonia, Spain.

Built in the first imperial period (1st century BC) and remodeled at the beginning of the 3rd century AD, the villa had a rich decor of marble and mosaics, with traces of stucco and paint. It was owned by several wealthy owners who possibly resided in the villa with his family and their slaves. An inscription has been found linking it to Gaius Marius. The villa was used until the Middle Ages when it fell into disrepair and ruin.

It is now conserved as a Bien de Interés Cultural.
