= Designation (heritage assets) =

Designation is the act of setting aside something, or devoting it to a particular purpose. In the legal planning context, it is also "the action of choosing a place for a special purpose or giving it a special status".

The process of designation confers a legal status on a property by a specific law and provides a degree of legal protection (which varies by country). The term 'designation' is used when referring to the formal protection by legal statute for a wide range of heritage assets, including listed buildings and World Heritage Sites as well as many others.

The UK Government publication Planning Policy Statement 5: (Planning for the Historic Environment) states that a designated heritage asset can be: a World Heritage Site, scheduled monument, listed building, protected wreck site, registered park and garden, registered battlefield or conservation area.

Each type of heritage asset is designated as such using different legislation.

== Types of heritage designation legislation ==
In the UK, the process of giving some measure of legal protection to special buildings and other historic artefacts, is grouped under the general term 'designation of heritage assets'.

This is also sometimes referred to as 'heritage designation' or as the 'heritage protection process' and uses a range of different pieces of heritage protection legislation which have been formed piecemeal over the centuries.

The purpose of designating heritage assets is to ensure that the significance and character of the asset in question is protected through the planning system, to ensure they are passed on to future generations.

The UK Government white paper Heritage Protection for the 21st Century describes designation as being "the first step in an effective heritage protection system. It is a means of identifying those aspects of our past that are most important to us, and explaining why they are important. Effective designation is also the basis for decisions about the way we manage change to the historic environment."

In England (Scotland, Ireland and Wales have their own legislative frameworks):

- Listed buildings: Buildings (and other structures which are not buildings, such as letter boxes, road signs, pedestrian crossings and so on) are generally "listed". This protection system has been in place since 1947 and operates under the Planning (Listed Buildings and Conservation Areas) Act 1990. The test for listing are architectural or historic interest, if a building is felt to meet the necessary standards, it is added to the list. This decision is taken by Secretary of State for the Department of Culture, Media and Sport.
- Scheduled monuments: Archaeological sites are "scheduled". Scheduling originated in 1882 and aims to protect key sites which are carefully managed for the future. The current system operates under the Ancient Monuments and Archaeological Areas Act 1979 and the Secretary of State has discretion in whether to schedule a site or to decide whether another form of management would be better.
- Historic wreck sites are designated under the Protection of Wrecks Act 973 and registered by Department of Culture, Media and Sport. Submerged sites up to 12 miles from the coast may be scheduled as well.
- Historic landscapes and ancient battlefields may be "registered". The Register of Parks and Gardens was created by the 1983 National Heritage Act. The Battlefields Register was established in 1995. Both registers are administered by English Heritage. These designations do not carry separate controls, but are material considerations in the planning process.
- Conservation areas of 'special architectural or historic interest whose character or appearance is worth protecting or enhancing' were first designated in 1967, and the legislation was revised in the Planning (Listed Buildings and Conservation Areas) Act 1990
- World Heritage Sites receive legal protection by UNESCO as of special cultural or physical significance.

=== Other types of heritage related designation ===
- The Designation Scheme for museums libraries and archives identifies collections of national and international importance held in England's non-national museums, libraries and archives, based on their quality and significance. This is a separate scheme from those used to designate architectural and archaeological heritage assets.
- Regional food receives protection through the European Union Protected Designation of Origin Scheme;
- Geographic areas and landscapes have their own suite of legislation including 'Area of Outstanding Natural Beauty (AONBs); country parks, National parks of England and Wales, marine conservation zones (MCZs) and many others.

== Implications of designation ==
The implications of becoming designated are recognised by a number of designated sites around the world, though the impacts are likely to vary considerably depending on the resources, location and management of the site itself.

- The site is more attractive to visitors – because designation gives an impression of quality and importance
- Visitors may have higher expectations – with associated management issues and economic benefits
- Increased local and national pride
- Increased planning protection – "key material planning consideration" in England;
- Higher profile in local and national context – support in funding applications, assessment of conflicting land use activities.

== Implications of designation for planning permission ==
Different UK government departments are involved with different parts of designation legislation, which has practical implications for those wishing to apply for planning permission.

In certain circumstances, heritage assets may affected by different pieces of overlapping legislation. A national park may contain scheduled monuments; a listed building may (or may not) be within a conservation area; a registered park and garden can contain a Site of Special Scientific Interest.

In England, the DCMS is responsible for the designation of heritage assets such as listed buildings; but the Department of the Environment, Food and Rural Affairs is responsible for Sites of Special Scientific Interest (SSSIs), Areas of Outstanding Natural Beauty, village greens etc. On the other hand, the Department of Communities and Local Government is responsible for the planning system. European Union law affects certain locations such as Special Areas of Conservation (SACs) whilst international law applies to World Heritage Sites.

=== Reforming the heritage protection process ===
There has been a long series of investigations, reports and plans to reform and restructure the heritage protection process.

Planning Policy Statement 5: Planning for the Historic Environment (PPS5) 2010 sets out planning policies on the conservation of the historic environment.

The Penfold Review was set up by the Department of Business, Innovation and Skills to identify whether non-planning consents delay or discourage investment published its final report in July 2010.

More recently the controversial draft National Planning Policy hopes to streamline planning policy whilst "reaffirming protections for the historic environment and heritage".

== How to designate and de-designate a heritage asset ==
In England, anyone can apply to English Heritage to ask for a building, monument, wreck etc. to be considered for designation. It is not necessary to be the owner of the asset in order to apply for it to be designated. There is an application form and guidance notes on the organisation's web site. Site that are under threat, for example of demolition, removal or salvage are given priority. The following information is required:

- The property address (or location information for sites without a postal address)
- Ownership details including contact details.
- Details of any current planning applications, permission or marine consent.
- Reasons why the historic asset should be assessed for designation (e.g. historic, architectural, archaeological, or artistic)
- Documentary and photographic evidence such as historic maps and research reports
- A list of the books, articles, websites etc. that have been used in the research.

It is also possible to ask for a site to be de-designated (or de-listed). If the Secretary of State agrees that a building (or other historic asset) no longer meets the statutory criteria for being included on the Heritage List, he can authorise it to be de-designated. Scotland, Wales and Northern Ireland use different processes.

== See also ==
- Listed building
- Scheduled monument
- National Register of Historic Parks and Gardens
- Protection of Wrecks Act 1973
- Conservation area (United Kingdom)
- Heritage asset
