= 1902–03 Madrid FC season =

1st season in existence of Real Madrid CF

Madrid FC
1902–03 season
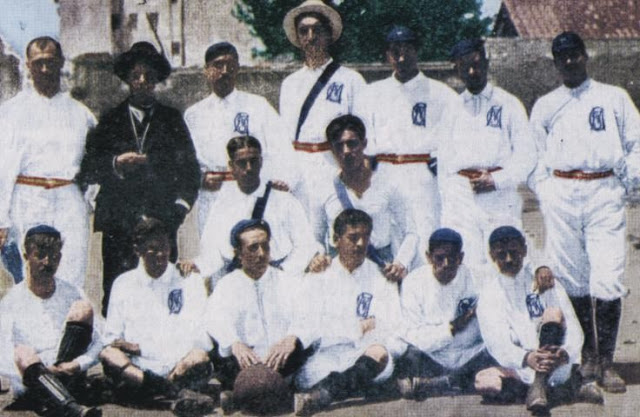
- Madrid FC team in 1902.
- President: Juan Padrós
- Manager: No manager
- Stadium: No home stadium
- Madrid Championship: Runners-up
- Copa del Rey: Runners-up
- Copa de la Coronación: Third place
- Top goalscorer: League: Adolfo Wandosell (~4); All: Adolfo Wandosell (~4)
- Biggest win: Madrid FC 4–1 Club Español de Football
- Biggest defeat: Madrid FC 2–3 Athletic Bilbao
Home colours	Away colours

The 1902–03 season was Madrid Football Club's 1st season in existence. The club played some friendly matches against local clubs. Madrid FC also played their first match outside of the Community of Madrid against Club Español de Fútbol (now RCD Espanyol) in Barcelona. The club also participated in the inaugural editions of the Copa del Rey and the Campeonato de Madrid (Madrid Championship).

== Summary ==
- 6 March: After a new Board presided by Juan Padrós had been elected, Madrid Football Club was officially founded.
- 9 March: Madrid FC played its first-ever match. The match was played between two teams of Madrid FC players between the streets of Alcalá and Goya, next to the old Plaza de Toros in Madrid. The two teams wore blue and red respectively. A. Meléndez, Juan Padrós, A. Spottorno, Gorostizaga, Mendía, Páramo, Neyra, A. Giralt, F. Palacios, Martens and Rodero played for the blue team. José Giralt, Meléndez, Molera, Salvador, Valcárcel, M. Spottorno, Stampher, Juan Palacios, Varela, Celada and Bueno played for the red team. The blue team won the match 1–0.
- 2 May: Madrid FC played its first match against another club in a friendly against New Foot-Ball Club that ended in a 1–1 draw.
- 13 May: The first ever match between Madrid FC and FC Barcelona was held. This was also Madrid FC's first competitive match. Arthur Johnson scored the club's first competitive goal in a 1–3 loss to Barça.
- 16 May: Madrid FC secured its first competitive victory defeating Club Español de Football (now RCD Espanyol) 3–2.
- 23 May: Alfonso Albéniz was the first player to leave Barcelona in order to join Madrid.
- 11 August: Madrid won two ceramic plates that represent the first trophy in its history. Part of the programme in the festivities at El Escorial featured a match between Madrid and Moncloa, the clash ended with a 6–5 score favourable to Madrid.
- 24 February 1903: Madrid FC played their first match outside of the Community of Madrid against Club Español de Fútbol in Barcelona.
- 6 April: Madrid FC played its first official competitive match and first Copa del Rey match.
- 8 April: The inaugural Copa del Rey final marked the first ever match between Madrid FC and Athletic Bilbao.

== Players ==
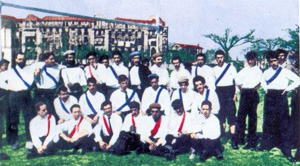
Madrid FC team in 1902.

Pos.	Nat.	Name	Age	Previous team	Contract ends
GK	(Spain)	Adolfo Meléndez	19	Sky Football	1909
DF	(Spain)	Juan Spottorno	16	First club	1904
DF	(Spain)	Mario Giralt	21	Sky Football	1907
DF	(Spain)	Eustaquio Celada	19	First club	1903
DF	(Spain)	Enrique Normand	16	New Foot-Ball Club	1915
DF	(Spain)	José Giralt (Captain)	20	Sky Football	1907
DF	(Spain)	Juan Padrós	33	Sky Football	1902
MF	(Spain)	Antonio Neyra	19	Sky Football	1909
MF	(Spain)	Leopoldo García	22	First club	1909
MF	(Spain)	Ramón de Cárdenas	19	First club	1903
MF	(Spain)	Adolfo Wandosell	19	New Foot-Ball Club	1907
MF	(Ireland)	Arthur Johnson	24	First club	1904
FW	(Spain)	Armando Giralt	18	Sky Football	1907
FW	(Guatemala)	Federico Revuelto	20	First club	1912
FW	(France)	Pedro Parages	20	Association Sportive Amicale	1909
FW	(Spain)	Álvaro Spottorno	23	First club	1903
FW	(Spain)	José de Gorostizaga	20	Sky Football	1903
FW	(England)	Stampher	20	Sky Football	1903
GK	(Spain)	Juan Sevilla		First club	1903
GK	(Spain)	Darío de Arana		First club	1903
MF	(Spain)	Arturo Meléndez		Sky Football	1905
MF	(Spain)	Enrique Varela de Seijas		Sky Football	1904
MF	(Spain)	Miguel de Valdeterrazo		New Foot-Ball Club	1904
MF	(Spain)	Leopoldo García Durán		First club	
MF	(Spain)	Ángel Barquín		Sky Football	1904
MF	(Spain)	José de Góngora		First club	1903
MF	(Spain)	Rafael Molera		First club	1903
MF	(Spain)	José Palacios		Sky Football	1903
MF	(Spain)	Manolo Mendía		Sky Football	1903
FW	(Spain)	Eugenio Bisbal		New Foot-Ball Club	1906
FW	(Belgium)	Carlos Maertens		First club	1904
FW	(Spain)	Enrique Rodero		First club	1903
FW	(Spain)	Eduardo Bueno		First club	1903
FW	(Spain)	Sáinz de los Terreros		First club	1902

== Unofficial ==
9 March 1902	Blue Team	1 – 0	Red Team	Hipódromo, Madrid
	A. Giralt A. Meléndez; Padrós, M. Spottorno; Gorostizaga, Mendía, Páramo; Neyra, A. Giralt, F. Palacios, Mertens, Rodeiro	Report	J. Giralt; E. Meléndez, Molera; A. Salvador, L. Valcárcel, A. Spottorno; Stampher, Palacios, Varela, Celada, Bueno
Note: The referee decreed the end of the match due to a lack of light.

16 March 1902	Blue Team	2 – 3	Red Team	Hipódromo, Madrid
	Neyra (2T); Bueno (2T) Goyarrola; F. Palacios, Lorenzo; Pacheco, Gorostizaga, A. Giralt; A. Salvador, Mendía, Bueno, A. Spottorno, Neyra	Report	J. Giralt (1T); Cárdenas (1T); Palacios (1T) Juan Sevilla; Palacios, Rodeiro; J. Giralt, M. Giralt, T. Terreros; M. Terreros, Celada, Cárdenas, Núñez, Stampher

23 March 1902	Blue Team	2 – 1	Red Team	Hipódromo, Madrid
	J. Giralt (1–1); A. Giralt (2–1) Núñez; Lorenzo, Ristich; Rodeiro, A. Meléndez, J. Giralt; Revuelto, M. Giralt, A. Terreros, A. Giralt, Pacheco	Report	Neyra (0–1) Molera; Stampher, E. Meléndez; Apodaca, Varela, Gorostizaga; J. Padrós, Spottorno, Neyra, Palacios, Bueno	Referee: Luis de Páramo

23 March 1902	Blue Team	2 – 2	Red Team	Hipódromo, Madrid
	J. Giralt (o.g.); Stampher (o.g.) Juan Sevilla; Celada, Lorenzo; M. Terreros, A. Terreros, Spottorno; Molera, J. Padrós, Revuelto, Núñez, Mendía	Report	Neyra J. Giralt; M. Giralt, Páramo; Neyra, Palacios, Bueno; Cárdenas, L. Valcárcel, Ristich, A. Giralt, Stampher

25 March 1902	Blue Team	0 – 3	Red Team	Hipódromo, Madrid
	Palacios; E. Meléndez, A. Meléndez; A. Giralt, J. Padrós, Bueno; Varela, Bernouilli, Lorenzo, L. Valcárcel, Celada	Report	Neyra Juan Sevilla; Gorostizaga, Mertens; Neyra, M. Terreros, A. Terreros; Cárdenas, Núñez, Revuelto, J. Giralt, Stampher
Note: Antonio Neyra scored a hat-trick for the Reds, one of them with a header.

== Friendlies ==
2 May 1902 Friendly	Madrid FC	1–1	New Foot-Ball Club	Hipódromo, Madrid
	Sainz de los Terreros	Report	Manuel Vallarino	Referee: Carlos Padrós

1 August 1902 Friendly	Madrid FC	3–1	Club Retiro	Hipódromo, Madrid
		Report

11 August 1902 Fiestas de San Lorenzo	Madrid FC	6–5	Moncloa FC	San Lorenzo de El Escorial
	Neyra ? ? ? ?	Report	L. Ramos ? ? ? ?	Referee: Eugenio Bisbal

2 November 1902 Friendly	Moncloa FC	2–7	Madrid FC	Hipódromo, Madrid
		Report		Referee: Irla

23 November 1902 Friendly	New Foot-Ball Club	0–4	Madrid FC	Retiro, Madrid
		Report	A. Giralt ? ? ?	Referee: Carlos Padrós

8 February 1903 Friendly	Madrid FC	4–0	Internacional FC	Av. Plaza de Toros, Madrid
	Parages ? ? ?	Report		Referee: Méndez

24 February 1903 Friendly	Club Español de Football	0–0	Madrid FC	Parc de la Ciutadella, Barcelona
		Report		Referee: Eduardo Alesson

26 April 1903 Friendly	Madrid FC	4–1	Moncloa FC	Av. Plaza de Toros, Madrid
		Report

3 May 1903 Friendly	Madrid FC	6–0	Moncloa FC	Av. Plaza de Toros, Madrid
		Report

28 June 1903 Friendly	Madrid FC	9–0	Moderno FC	Hipódromo, Madrid
		Report

=== Concurso de Bandas ===
14 December 1902 Concurso de bandas	Moncloa FC	0–8	Madrid FC	Hipódromo, Madrid
		Report		Referee: Hummer

23 December 1902 Concurso de bandas	Madrid FC	9–2	New Foot-Ball Club	Hipódromo, Madrid
	Neyra; A. Giralt 45'; Johnson; Parages; Neyra; J. Giralt	Report	? (pen.); Romero	Referee: García

25 December 1902 Concurso de bandas	Madrid FC	16–0	Moderno FC	Hipódromo, Madrid
		Report		Referee: Ursúa

28 December Concurso de bandas	Madrid FC	19–1	Club Español de Madrid	Hipódromo, Madrid
		Report		Referee: L. Ramos

23 January 1903 Concurso de bandas	Madrid FC	12–0	Club Retiro	Av. Plaza de Toros, Madrid
		Report

=== Trofeo Codorniú ===
14 June 1903 Codorníu Trophy	Madrid FC	13–1	Coalición Matritense	Hipódromo, Madrid
	A. Giralt; Neyra; A. Giralt; Neyra; Lee; Revuelto; Parages; Neyra	Report	Garrido	Referee: J. Iturriaga

21 June 1903 Codorníu Trophy	Madrid FC	7–0	Coalición Matritense	Hipódromo, Madrid
	A. Giralt; Lee ? Neyra; A. Giralt; Neyra	Report		Referee: Manuel Yarza

== Competitions ==
=== Overview ===
Competition	First match	Last match	Starting round	Final position	Record							
Competition	First match	Last match	Starting round	Final position	Pld	W	D	L	GF	GA	GD	Win %
Copa del Rey	6 April 1903	8 April 1903	Semi-finals	Runners-up	2	1	0	1	6	4	+2	50.00
Copa de la Coronación	13 May 1902	16 May 1902	Semi-finals	Third place	2	1	0	1	4	5	−1	50.00
Campeonato de Madrid	15 November 1903	20 December 1903	Matchday 1	Runners-up	2	1	0	1	22	4	+18	50.00
Total					6	3	0	3	32	13	+19	50.00

Source: Rec.Sport.Soccer Statistics Foundation Leyenda Blanca

=== Copa de la Coronación ===
The 1902 Copa de la Coronación, officially Concurso Madrid de Foot-ball Association (Madrid Contest of Association Football) was an unofficial football competition in honour of the coronation of Alfonso XIII of Spain. It is not recognized by the Royal Spanish Football Federation or the Liga de Fútbol Profesional (LFP).

13 May 1902 1902 Copa de la Coronación Semi-finals	Madrid FC	1–3	FC Barcelona	Hipódromo, Madrid
	Arthur Johnson	Report	Udo Steinberg; Joan Gamper (pen.)	Referee: (Spain) Arana

16 May 1902 Copa de la Gran Peña/Runner-up trophy	Madrid FC	3–2	Club Español de Football	Hipódromo, Madrid
	? ? ?	Report	? ?

=== Copa del Rey ===
6 April 1903 Semifinals	Madrid FC	4–1	Club Español de Football	Hipódromo, Madrid
	A. Giralt; Pache; Parages	Report	Cenarro 40'	Referee: Juan Astorquia

8 April 1903 Final	Madrid FC	2–3	Athletic Bilbao	Hipódromo, Madrid
	Valdetarrazo 15'; Neyra 40'	Report	Cazeaux 55'; Montejo 60'; Alejandro 80'	Referee: José María Soler

=== Campeonato de Madrid ===
The 1902–03 Campeonato de Madrid was the inaugural edition of the Campeonato Regional Centro. Despite beginning in November 1903, it corresponds to the 1902–03 Spanish football season.

==== League table ====
Pos	Team	Pld	W	D	L	GF	GA	GD	Pts
1	Moderno FC (C)	2	2	0	0	9	1	+8	4
2	Madrid FC	2	1	0	1	9	3	+6	2
3	Moncloa FC	2	1	0	1	4	4	0	2
4	Iberia FC	2	0	0	2	0	14	−14	0

Source: Rec.Sport.Soccer Statistics Foundation
Rules for classification: 1) points; 2) goal difference; 3) number of goals scored.
(C) Champions

==== Matches ====
15 November 1903 1903 Campeonato de Madrid	Madrid FC	8–0	Iberia FC	Hipódromo, Madrid
		Report

29 November 1903 1903 Campeonato de Madrid	Moderno FC	1–4	Madrid FC	Hipódromo, Madrid
		Report
Note: Madrid FC started the match with 10 players.

8 December 1903 1903 Campeonato de Madrid	Madrid FC	?–?	Moncloa FC	Hipódromo, Madrid
		Report
Note: The match was postponed on 22 November 1902 because of Moncloa FC's improper line-up.

20 December 1903 1903 Campeonato de Madrid	Moncloa FC	3–1	Madrid FC	Hipódromo, Madrid
	Merino; García	Report	Valdeterrazo	Referee: Álvarez

23 December 1903 1903 Campeonato de Madrid	Iberia FC	0–9	Madrid FC	Hipódromo, Madrid
		Report	Parages; Revuelto; Wandosell; Mendía	Referee: Garrido

3 January 1904 1903 Campeonato de Madrid	Madrid FC	?–?	Moderno FC	Hipódromo, Madrid
		Report
