= 1903–04 Madrid FC season =

2nd season in existence of Real Madrid CF

Madrid FC/Madrid–Moderno
1903–04 season
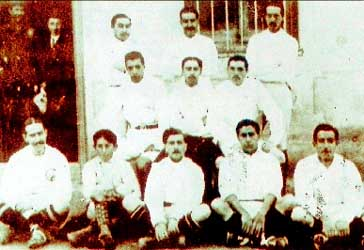
- Madrid FC team in 1904.
- President: Juan Padrós (until January); Carlos Padrós (since January)
- Manager: No manager
- Stadium: No home stadium
- Copa del Rey: First round
- Madrid Championship (Note: The Campeonato de Madrid (Madrid Championship) was a regional qualifier for the Copa del Rey.): Semi-finals
- Top goalscorer: League: — All: Yarza (2)
- Biggest win: Madrid FC 8–0 Moderno FC; Madrid FC 8–0 Moncloa FC (friendlies)
- Biggest defeat: Moncloa FC 3–1 Real Madrid (friendly)
Home colours	Away colours

The 1903–04 season was Madrid Football Club's 2nd season in existence. The club played some friendly matches against local clubs. Madrid FC also played their second-ever match outside of the Community of Madrid against Athletic Bilbao in Bilbao.

They also played in the Campeonato de Madrid (Madrid Championship) and the Copa del Rey. Madrid FC merged with Moderno Football Club on 30 January 1904 and contested these championships under the name Madrid–Moderno.

== Summary ==
Some of Madrid FC's best players left to join the newly formed Athletic Club Sucursal de Madrid (now Atlético Madrid) during the season. This precipitated a merger with Moderno FC on 30 January 1904 in order to survive. Carlos Padrós was elected president post-merger.

== Players ==
Note: Flags indicate national team as defined under FIFA eligibility rules; some limited exceptions apply. Players may hold more than one non-FIFA nationality.

No.	Pos.	Nation	Player
—	GK	EIR	Arthur Johnson
—	GK	ESP	Manuel Alcalde Bahamonde
—	GK	ESP	Juan Sevilla
—	GK		Lafora
—	GK	ESP	Adolfo Meléndez
—	DF	ESP	M. Spottorno
—	DF	ESP	José Giralt
—	DF	ESP	Enrique Normand
—	DF	ESP	Mario Giralt
—	DF	ESP	Plácido Álvarez-Buylla
—	DF	ESP	Telesforo Álvarez
—	MF	ESP	M. Yarza
—	MF	ESP	Leopoldo García Durán
—	MF	ESP	José de Góngora
—	MF	ESP	Luciano Lizárraga
—	MF	ESP	Antonio Neyra

No.	Pos.	Nation	Player
—	MF	ESP	Ángel Barquín
—	MF		Manuel Vallarino
—	MF	ESP	Ramón de Cárdenas
—	MF	ESP	Enrique Varela de Seijas
—	MF	ESP	Arturo Meléndez
—	MF	ESP	José Palacios
—	MF	ESP	Adolfo Wandosell
—	MF		Hodans
—	FW	ESP	Miguel de Valdeterrazo
—	FW	ESP	Joaquín Yarza
—	FW	GUA	Federico Revuelto
—	FW	FRA	Pedro Parages
—	FW		Mertens
—	FW	ESP	Eugenio Bisbal
—	FW	ESP	Antonio Alonso Giménez-Cuenca
—	FW	ESP	Armando Giralt

== Transfers ==
=== In ===
Pos.	Player	From
GK	(Spain) Manuel Alcalde Bahamonde	
GK	Lafora	
DF	(Spain) Plácido Álvarez-Buylla	
DF	(Spain) Telesforo Álvarez	
DF	(Spain) M. Yarza	
MF	Manuel Vallarino	
MF	(Spain) Luciano Lizárraga	
MF	Hodans	
FW	(Spain) Joaquín Yarza	
FW	(Spain) Antonio Alonso Giménez-Cuenca	

=== Out ===
Date	Pos.	Player	To
Pre-season	FW	(Spain) Álvaro Spottorno	
Pre-season	DF	(Spain) Eustaquio Celada	
Pre-season	DF	(Spain) Juan Padrós	
Pre-season	MF	(Spain) Leopoldo García	
Pre-season	MF	(Spain) Darío de Arana	
Pre-season	MF	(Spain) Rafael Molera	
Pre-season	MF	(Spain) Manolo Mendía	
Pre-season	FW	(Spain) José de Gorostizaga	
Pre-season	FW	(England) Stampher	
Pre-season	FW	(Spain) Enrique Rodero	
Pre-season	FW	(Spain) Eduardo Bueno	
Pre-season	FW	(Spain) Sáinz de los Terreros	
October 1903	MF	(Spain) Antonio Neyra	Español de Madrid
October 1903	MF	(Spain) Enrique Aruabarrena	Español de Madrid
October 1903		(Spain) Pérez	Español de Madrid
October 1903	MF	Manuel Vallarino	Español de Madrid
October 1903	MF	(Spain) Ramón de Cárdenas	Español de Madrid
October 1903	DF	(Spain) José Giralt	Español de Madrid
October 1903	DF	(Spain) Mario Giralt	Español de Madrid
October 1903	FW	(Spain) Armando Giralt	Español de Madrid

== Friendlies ==
2 August 1903 Friendly	Madrid FC	8–0	Moderno FC	La Lonja, El Escorial
		Report

12 August 1903 Friendly	Madrid FC	8–0	Moncloa FC	La Lonja, San Lorenzo de El Escorial
		Report		Referee: Navarro
Note: Madrid FC was awarded a prize consisting of a diploma in an allegory of football and 11 silver medals.

8 September 1903 Friendly	Villaviciosa y Colonial	3–6	Madrid FC	Villaviciosa de Odón
		Report
Note: Madrid FC was forced to play this match with only nine players as a result of some of their players leaving the club which precipitated Madrid FC's merger with Moderno FC in order to survive. Villaviciosa y Colonial was made up of local players from Villaviciosa and Colonial.

11 October 1903 Concurso de bandas	Madrid FC	1–3	Moncloa FC	Hipódromo, Madrid
		Report

25 October 1903 Friendly	Madrid FC	1–0	Moderno FC	Av. Plaza de Toros, Madrid
	?	Report		Referee: Merino

1 November 1903 Friendly	Combinado El Escorial	1–4	Madrid FC	La Lonja, El Escorial
		Report		Referee: Merino

28 February 1904 Friendly	Athletic Bilbao	2–1	Madrid–Moderno	Lamiaco, Bilbao
	? 15' ? (?)	Report	? 45'	Referee: Arana

== Competitions ==
=== Overview ===
Competition	First match	Last match	Starting round	Final position	Record							
Competition	First match	Last match	Starting round	Final position	Pld	W	D	L	GF	GA	GD	Win %
Copa del Rey/Campeonato de Madrid	19 March 1904	19 March 1904	First round	First round	1	0	1	0	5	5	+0	0.00
Total					1	0	1	0	5	5	+0	0.00

Source: Competitions

=== Copa del Rey ===
The 1904 Copa del Rey was organized by the newly formed Madrid Football Federation. Originally, three teams were to participate, and the Federation invited Athletic Bilbao representing Biscay and Espanyol representing Catalonia. Madrid was to be represented by the winner of a preliminary round between Club Español de Madrid and Madrid-Moderno (a merger of Madrid CF and Moderno FC). The three teams were to contest the cup in a round-robin format. Before the tournament, Espanyol, unhappy with the competition system, announced they would not go to Madrid. Then two more teams from Madrid, Moncloa FC and Iberia Football Club, were admitted in the competition, forcing a change to the schedule. As a result, the four Madrid teams were scheduled to play a single-elimination tournament to decide their representative for the Copa del Rey final against automatically qualified Athletic Bilbao.

The semi-final qualifying match between Club Español de Madrid and Madrid-Moderno ended in 5–5 draw. The captains of both teams agreed not to play extra time, but failed to reach an agreement on when they should replay the match. Español wanted to play the next day, but Madrid-Moderno refused, citing the rules of the tournament which stated that a replay could not be played less than 48 hours after the previous game. The next day Club Español went to replay the match, but Madrid-Moderno did not appear. The regional federation, whose president Ceferino Birdalone happened to be president of Club Español as well, ruled in favor of Español, and they were declared winners of the match eliminating Madrid FC from the competition.

19 March 1904 Madrid Championship – Semifinals	Madrid–Moderno	5–5	Club Español de Madrid	Tiro del Pichón, Madrid
	Yarza; Parages; Revuelto; Alonso		? ? ? ? ?	Referee: Garrido
Note: The captains of both teams agreed not to play extra time, but failed to reach an agreement on when they should replay the match. The Club Español de Madrid wanted to play at the same time the next day, but the Madrid-Moderno refused, and alleged that in the bases of the tournament was said that no tie could be played in less than 48 hours after the game. Next day the Club Español de Madrid went to play the replay, but the Madrid-Moderno did not. The regional federation, whose president Ceferino Birdalone happened to be president of Club Español de Madrid as well, ruled in favor of Club Español, who were declared winners of the match.
