= Football in Madrid =

Overview of association football in the Spanish capital Madrid

Location map of professional football clubs in the city of Madrid

Football is the most popular sport, both in terms of participants and spectators, in Madrid. Madrid is the only city that had derby matches in the UEFA Champions League finals (2014 and 2016).

== History ==
=== Origins ===
Football was introduced to Madrid at the end of the 19th century when the industrial exchange between the Spanish capital and Great Britain was in full effect. The first stone was laid around May 1879, when the Britons and some members of the city's high society agreed to form a society dedicated to cricket and football, the Cricket and Football Club of Madrid, which followed the British associations as a reference. It was registered at the time of its creation, thus becoming the first legalized sports club in the country. It is not known with certainty what the fate of this team was, although it seems that it disappeared a few years later.

Football returned to the capital only after almost 20 years, through the academics and students of the Institución Libre de Enseñanza, which included several Cambridge and Oxford University graduates. For the Spaniards, football meant a distraction from the pessimism that was taking over Spain due to the loss of its last colonies at the end of the 19th century. Football became their best source for escapism and so, together with the British graduates, they founded (Sociedad) Sky Football in December 1897, commonly known as La Sociedad (The Society) as it was the only one based in Madrid, playing on Vallecas and Sunday mornings at Moncloa, one of the historical football areas of Madrid. Sky began to play matches among its members to promote the new sport in the capital, and soon held its first Board meeting on 5 January 1898, in which the club was officially established and legalized. In its first years this entity only coexisted with the Association Sportive Française, which was also born in 1897, in parallel to the creation of Sky, possibly due to the relationship between the students of Lycée Français de Madrid and those from the Libre de Enseñanza.

In 1900, three years after its founding, a conflict between members caused some of Sky's most important founding members to leave and create a new club, which later become Real Madrid CF. Said split was led by Julián Palacios, who is recognized as the first Real Madrid president, and was backed by the Giralts (Mario, José and Armando) and by the Catalan brothers, Juan and Carlos Padrós, the latter two being future presidents of Real Madrid. On 6 March 1902, after a new Board presided by Juan Padrós was elected, Madrid FC was officially founded.

=== First tournaments ===
The Padrós brothers were the fundamental heads behind the development of football in Madrid. Carlos Padrós, willing to improve the model of the Catalan Copa Macaya and taking advantage of the coronation of King Alfonso XIII, sponsored the Copa de la Coronación in 1902 with the help of the City Council. Despite being hosted in Madrid, however, the final was ultimately contested by Catalan FC Barcelona and Basque Athletic Club de Bilbao. One year later, Carlos Padrós also promoted the creation of the first football federation in Madrid, the Madrid Association of Foot-ball Clubs, of which he was its first president. It was the second football association in Spain only to the Catalan one. In December 1902, this entity organized its first-ever tournament, Concurso de Bandas, which is now regarded as the first incarnation of a Madrid Cup and the forerunner for the Regional Championship of Madrid that began in the following year. These first and archaic competitions were contested by the likes of Moncloa FC (June 1902), Moderno FC and Iberia FC (October 1902), New Foot-Ball Club (former Sky Football club), Español de Madrid (created from a second split within Sky), all of which, except for the latter, ended up being absorbed by Madrid FC, besides other almost insignificant clubs with hardly any importance such as Hispania FC, Club Retiro and Victoria FC. The first edition of the regional championship was won by Moderno FC to the surprise of many, who was followed by Español de Madrid, who had been recently strengthened with the incorporating several dissent members of Madrid FC, such as the Giralts, Antonio Neyra, Ramón de Cárdenas and Manuel Vallarino.

In the year 1903, a Basque colony of students led by Eduardo de Acha met representatives of Athletic Club, one of the clubs of the team Bizcaya that had won the Copa de la Coronación (now Copa del Rey) to create a branch of the club of Bilbao in Madrid: Athletic de Madrid (nowadays, Club Atlético Madrid). Athletic Club helped Athletic de Madrid since the first moment, giving them uniforms, the badge and the name. In the first years, Athletic de Madrid could not participate in national tournaments due to their link with Athletic Club. Athletic de Madrid got their independence in 1907, when they stopped being a branch of the classic Basque club.

== Current standings ==
Real Madrid competes in La Liga and play their home games at the Santiago Bernabéu Stadium. The club is one of the most widely supported teams in the world and their supporters are referred to as Madridistas or Merengues (Meringues). Real's supporters in Madrid are said to be better off citizens and more politically conservative. The club was selected as the best club of the 20th century, being the fifth most valuable sports club in the world and the most successful Spanish football club with a total of 104 official titles (this includes a record 15 European Cups and a record 36 La Liga trophies).

Atlético Madrid, founded in 1903, also competes in La Liga and plays their home games at the Metropolitano Stadium. The club is well-supported in the city, having the third largest national fan base in Spain and their supporters are referred to as Atléticos or Colchoneros (The Mattressers). Atlético is said to draw its support mostly from working-class citizens. The club is considered an elite European team, having won three UEFA Europa League titles and reached three European Cup finals. Domestically, Atletico have won eleven league titles and ten Copa del Reys.

Rayo Vallecano are the third most important football team of the city, based in the Vallecas neighborhood. They currently compete in La Liga, having secured promotion in 2021. The club's fans tend, it is said, to be politically left-wing and are known as Buccaneers.

In 2018, Madrid provided the two clubs that won the UEFA Champions League and UEFA Europa League – Real Madrid and Atlético Madrid, respectively.

Madrid hosted five European Cup/Champions League finals, four at the Santiago Bernabéu, and the 2019 final at the Metropolitano. The Bernabéu also hosted the Euro 1964 Final (which Spain won) and 1982 FIFA World Cup Final.

== Clubs ==
There are several clubs in Madrid:

Club	League	Venue	Established	Capacity
Real Madrid	La Liga	Santiago Bernabéu	1902	85,454
Atlético Madrid	La Liga	Civitas Metropolitano	1903	68,000
Rayo Vallecano	La Liga	Estadio de Vallecas	1924	15,500
Real Madrid Castilla	Primera Federación	Alfredo di Stéfano	1930	6,000
Unión Adarve	Segunda Federación	Garcia de la Mata	1961	1,200
Rayo Vallecano B	Tercera Federación	Ciudad Deportiva	1956	2,500
Moratalaz	Preferente de Madrid	La Dehesa	2006	2,500
Carabanchel	Tercera Federación	La Mina	1916	2,000
Villaverde San Andrés	Tercera Federación	Ciudad deportiva Boetticher	1988	500

== Honours ==
- Spain football champions (47)
  - Real Madrid (36)
  - Atlético Madrid (11)
- Copa del Rey (30)
  - Real Madrid (20)
  - Atlético Madrid (10)
- European Cup/UEFA Champions League
  - Real Madrid (15)
- UEFA Super Cup
  - Real Madrid (5)
  - Atletico Madrid (3)
- UEFA Cup/UEFA Europa League (5)
  - Atlético Madrid (3)
  - Real Madrid (2)
- UEFA Cup Winners' Cup (1)
  - Atlético Madrid (1)
- FIFA Club World Cup
  - Real Madrid (5)
- Intercontinental Cup
  - Real Madrid (4)
  - Atlético Madrid (1)

== Stadiums ==
- Santiago Bernabéu Stadium – hosted the 1982 FIFA World Cup Final
- Wanda Metropolitano
- Estadio de Vallecas

== Famous footballers from Madrid ==
- Emilio Butragueño
- Raúl
- David de Gea

== See also ==
- Madrid Derby
- Football in Spain
- Campeonato Regional Centro
- Divisiones Regionales de Fútbol in the Community of Madrid
- Madrid autonomous football team
- Madrid Football Federation
