= Eugenio Vallarino =

Spanish footballer (1886–1919)

Personal information
- Full name: Eugenio Vallarino de Iraola
- Date of birth: 13 November 1886
- Place of birth: Madrid, Spain
- Date of death: 31 December 1919 (aged 33)
- Position: Midfielder

Senior career*
Years	Team	Apps	(Gls)
1902	New Foot-Ball Club	2	(0)
1903	Internacional Foot-ball Club	1	(0)
1903–1904	Madrid FC	1	(0)
1910–1911	AC Valladolid	1	(0)
- * Club domestic league appearances and goals

Eugenio Vallarino de Iraola (13 November 1886 – 31 December 1919) was a Spanish footballer who played as a midfielder for Madrid FC and Real Valladolid. His older brother Manuel Vallarino also played for Madrid FC.

== Career ==
=== New FC ===
Born in Madrid, Vallarino began his football career at New Foot-Ball Club, one of the first football clubs in the capital, joining its ranks in 1902, aged 16, during a time in which his older brother Manuel was serving as the club's president. When Madrid FC endorsed a tournament in the capital for the May festivities, which became known as Copa de la Coronación, the forerunner of the Copa del Rey founded a year later, his brother Manuel organized a series of matches between the club's members as part of New's build-up to the tournament, and Eugenio played in two of these matches, on 30 March and 6 April 1902. However, he was ultimately not selected for the New squad that played in the Copa de la Coronación.

=== Internacional FC ===
After the poor sporting results experienced, chaos settled within the entity, and as a result of the disagreements among its members, many of them, including the Vallarino brothers, decided to leave the club, but while Manuel joined Madrid FC, Eugenio decided to participate in the foundation of a new one, Internacional Foot-ball Club, in January 1903. He appeared on the club's first board of directors as a member alongside Angel Garrido and Miguel de Valdeterrazo. On 8 February, Vallarino started for Internacional in a friendly match against Madrid FC, which ended in a 4–0 loss. Just three months after being founded, Internacional FC was suffering from a lack of players, so in order to survive, they decided to accept an agreement proposed by the directors of Madrid FC, Juan and Carlos Padrós, of merging the two clubs, and so, in April 1903, they were absorbed by Madrid FC. These absorptions or mergers between clubs were common at the time, as was the departure of players from one club to form another.

=== Madrid FC ===
During his first few months at the club, Vallarino was unable to play a single match, official or otherwise, but then, in October 1903, some of Madrid's founding members and best players left the club, such as the Giralt brothers (José and Armando), Antonio Neyra, and Ramón de Cárdenas. As a result of this, in Madrid's very next match on 8 September, a friendly match against Villaviciosa y Colonial, Madrid was forced to play with only nine players, including the Vallarino brothers, which meant Eugenio's debut for the Madrid first team, and despite the numerical disadvantage, they were able to seal a 6–3 win; however, the goalscorers of this match are unknown.

=== AC Valladolid ===
Vallarino played his last known season as a footballer for AC Valladolid in 1911, at the age of 25.

== Personal life ==
Vallarino married Mercedes Cánovas del Castillo, and the couple had four children Eugenio, Jesús María, Mercedes, and José Manuel Vallarino Cánovas del Castillo. He died on 31 December 1919, at the age of 33.
