= Rafael Molera =

Spanish footballer and politician

Personal information
- Full name: Rafael Molera Cebrián
- Date of birth: 1881
- Place of birth: Chimillas, Huesca, Spain
- Date of death: 7 January 1930 (aged 48–49)
- Place of death: Unknown
- Position: Defender

Senior career*
Years	Team	Apps	(Gls)
1902–1903	Madrid FC		
- * Club domestic league appearances and goals

Rafael Molera Cebrián (1881 – 7 January 1930) was a Spanish footballer who played as a defender for Madrid FC.

== Football career ==
Born in Chimillas, Huesca, Molera moved to Madrid in the late 1890s to study at the Central University of Madrid, where he began playing football. Together with the Giralt brothers (José, Armando, Mario) and Antonio Neyra, he was a member of the Madrid squad that participated in the very first national tournament played in Spain, the 1902 Copa de la Coronación. In the semifinals on 13 May, Molera went down in history as one of the eleven footballers who played in the very first El Clásico in history, which ended in a 3–1 loss to the Catalans. He then helped Madrid win the club's first-ever trophy, the Copa de la Gran Peña, the consolation trophy of the Copa de la Coronación.

Molera returned to his homeland Huelva and only returned a few months later in February, with one of the newspapers of the time dedicating a separate paragraph to his return, calling him a "distinguished player" and giving a "cordial welcome". Together with the Giralt brothers, Neyra, Pedro Parages, Federico Revuelto, and Miguel de Valdeterrazo, Molera was a member of Madrid FC's first-ever complete season, in 1902–03, during which he only played a single match, the 1903 Copa del Rey final against Athletic Bilbao, which ended in a 2–3 loss.

In 1910, Molera refereed a match in the Huelva provincial championship.

== Political career ==
A lawyer and landlord by profession, Molera, an Agrarian and member of the ALGAA (Asociación de Labradores y Ganaderos del Alto Aragón), was one of the founders of Unión Patriótica in Huelva. In 1913, following the death of the liberal deputy José Arizón, an election was scheduled for 8 June to find his successor, but for the sake of the prevailing harmony, only one liberal candidate was going to be presented. However, the 32-year-old Molera was proclaimed candidate after gathering 877 signatures (he only needed 622), and was able to participate in the Huelva elections despite the fact that neither conservatives nor liberals were interested, thus becoming the first "agrarian" to struggle to enter the institutions. In the elections, the liberal network and its candidate Antonio Vallés Allué, a 56-year-old landowner from Bandaliés, obtained 5,308 votes against the 2,190 that the incipient agrarianism Molera obtained.

The sector of conservative and agrarian politicians came to power during the dictatorship of Primo de Rivera, which they had not been able to do so with the liberal restorationist system. On 15 January 1924, the Alto Aragonese press reported that Molera had been appointed as a deputy for the Benabarre-Tamarite District by the Governor of Huesca, in accordance with the new decrees published by the dictatorship.

== Death ==
Molera died in the Hospital del Rey at Chamartín de la Rosa on 7 January 1930, at the age of 48.

== Honours ==
Madrid FC

- Campeonato de Madrid:
  - Champions (1): 1903–04
- Copa del Rey:
  - Runner-up (1): 1903

== See also ==
- List of Real Madrid CF players
