= Eustaquio Celada =

Spanish footballer (1883–1930)

Personal information
- Full name: Eustaquio Celada
- Date of birth: 1883
- Place of birth: Reinosa, Cantabria, Spain
- Date of death: 8 October 1930 (aged 46–47)
- Position: Forward

Senior career*
Years	Team	Apps	(Gls)
1902–1903	Madrid FC		
1903–1904	Athletic de Madrid		
1904–1906	Athletic Club		
1906–1907	Club Vizcaya	1	(0)
- * Club domestic league appearances and goals

Eustaquio Celada (1883 - 8 October 1930) was a Spanish footballer who played as a forward for Madrid FC, Athletic de Madrid and Athletic Club. He was one of the most important figures in the amateur beginnings of football in Madrid, being involved in the foundation of both Real Madrid CF and Atlético Madrid). He also started for Madrid in the very first El Clásico in history on 13 May 1902, and featured in two back-to-back Copa del Rey finals in 1906 and 1907.

== Biography ==
Together with Julián Palacios, the Giralt brothers (José, Armando, Mario) and Antonio Neyra, Celada was a member of Madrid FC's first-ever complete season, in 1902–03. Celada was a member of the Madrid team that participated in the very first national tournament played in Spain, the 1902 Copa de la Coronación. In the semi-finals on 13 May, Celada went down in history as one of the eleven footballers who played in the very first El Clásico in history, which ended in a 3–1 loss to Barça.

Despite some encouraging first steps with the white club, he was nonetheless one of the enthusiastic youngsters who left just a few months later to found a club that would represent Athletic Club de Bilbao in the capital, Athletic Madrid, on 26 April 1903. He appeared on the club's first board of directors as a member and as an old striker of Madrid FC. On 2 May 1903, Celada went down in history as one of the eleven footballers who played in the first game of Atlético Madrid, which was played at the Tiro del Pichón between the 25 members that formed it, except for the treasurer Enrique Goiri who acted as referee. The club went on to disassociate itself from the Basques, going on to have its own identity. Its now known as today Atlético Madrid.

In 1905, Celada began to play for Athletic Madrid's counterpart in Bilbao, making his competitive debut on 10 April 1906 in the final of the 1906 Copa del Rey, which ended in a 1–4 loss to his former club Madrid FC. In 1907, the best players from Athletic and Unión Vizcaino came together to form Club Bizcaya, which was specially created to take part in the 1907 Copa del Rey, and Cárdenas was elected into the final cut, where he featured alongside the likes of Juan Arzuaga, Ramón de Cárdenas, the Sena brothers (Alfonso and Miguel), and Charles Simmons. He helped his side to reach the final, which they lost 0–1 to Madrid FC, courtesy of a late goal from Manuel Prast.

== Honours ==
Club Bizcaya

- Copa del Rey: Runner-up 1906

Club Bizcaya

- Copa del Rey: Runner-up 1907
