= Internacional Foot-ball Club =

Football club in Spain active in 1903

- Full name: Internacional Foot-ball Club
- Nickname: Internacional of Madrid
- Short name: Internacional FC
- Founded: January 1903
- Dissolved: 1906
- Ground: Various
- Chairman: William MacAndrews
- League: Centro championship
Home colours

The Internacional Foot-ball Club was a football team based in Madrid, Spain, which existed only in 1903. Its predecessor was the New Foot-Ball Club, disappearing just three months later when it merged with Moderno-Madrid FC (now Real Madrid).

== Beginnings ==
The Sky Foot-Ball Club, founded in 1897, gave rise to some of the first clubs in the capital, such as Madrid FC in 1900, Español de Madrid in 1901, and a year later, at end of 1902, and in the midst of the dispute over the Concurso de Bandas, the club's situation became complicated again when a new and definitive split in society led to the disappearance of the dean Madrid club, giving rise to a new one: the Internacional Foot-ball Club in 1903.

The club's first members were joined by half a dozen English players as reinforcements, and they played their first game against Madrid FC, which was now the oldest club in Madrid and who also reinforced by former New players. The club's first Board of Directors was made up as follows: President, Tomás Guyarro; Vice President, Tomás Moore; Secretary, Eugenio Bisbal; Treasurer, Pío Wandoseil; Members: George Graig, Eugenio Vallarino, Angel Garrido, D. E. Valenti and Luis Romero de Tejada. Due to the limited extension of said sport in the country, there were still no proper or properly formed venues for its practice, so this group of football pioneers was distributed by different vacant lots and areas of the city in which the players themselves arrived early to paint the lines of the field and prepare the goals to be able to play their matches.

== Decline and Collapse ==
Internacional FC was struggling to survive because of a lack of players, so the directors of Madrid FC, Juan and Carlos Padrós proposed them, an agreement that could benefit everyone: a merger. Internacional FC accepted in order to survive, and so, in April 1903, just three months after being founded, they were absorbed by Madrid FC, like so many others. These absorptions or mergers between clubs were common at the time, as was the departure of players from one club to form another or join the one they believed in. It was one of the reasons for the instability and disappearance suffered by many clubs at the time, where progress seemed like a feat.

== Honours ==
- Campeonato Regional Centro:
  - Runners-up (1): 1906
