= Ramón de Cárdenas =

Spanish football executive, and player

4th President of Atlético Madrid
- In office 1909–1912
- Preceded by: Ricardo de Gondra
- Succeeded by: Julián Ruete

Personal details
- Born: 9 April 1884 Madrid, Spain
- Died: 31 October 1943 (aged 59) Dénia, Valencia, Spain
Association football career
- Full name: Ramón de Cárdenas Pastor
- Birth name: Ramón de Cárdenas y Pastor
- Position: Midfielder
Senior career*
Years	Team	Apps	(Gls)
1901–1902	Sky Foot-Ball Club		
1902–1903	Madrid FC		
1903–1905	Español de Madrid		
1905–1906	Athletic de Madrid		
1905–1906	Athletic Club		
1906–1907	Club Vizcaya	1	(0)
- * Club domestic league appearances and goals

Ramón de Cárdenas Pastor (9 April 1884 – 31 October 1943) was a Spanish lawyer and footballer who played as a midfielder for Madrid FC (now Real Madrid CF), Athletic Club, Español de Madrid, Athletic de Madrid and Club Vizcaya. He is best known for being the fourth president of the Athletic Club de Madrid (now Atlético Madrid) between 1909 and 1912. He is the brother of the architects Manuel de Cárdenas Pastor and Ignacio de Cárdenas Pastor.

== Playing career ==
=== Sky/New FC ===
Cárdenas was born in Madrid as the son of Ramón de Cárdenas y Padilla (1852–1926), a journalist born in Havana who had emigrated to Madrid at the end of the 19th century and who belonged to the Spanish nobility. He developed a deep interest in football in his youth, and soon enough he became one of the first football personalities in the capital. Cárdenas was one of the enthusiastic footballers that joined and played for Sky Foot-Ball Club, the first club to ever exist in the capital. However, the instability within the club prevented its development, and after suffering two major splits in 1900 and 1901, Cárdenas decided to leave the club in the third split, on 15 March 1902, joining Madrid FC, who had just been officially established on 6 March in the infamous meeting held in the back room of Al Capricho. The last match he played for Sky was on 9 March, in a friendly between the club's members, as part of Sky's build-up for the upcoming Copa de la Coronación, the forerunner of the Copa del Rey founded a year later. In this game, Cárdenas played for the White Team and netted a goal in a 1–2 loss.

=== Madrid FC and Español de Madrid ===
Together with Julián Palacios, the Padrós brothers (Carlos and Juan), the Giralt brothers (José, Armando, Mario) and Antonio Neyra, Cárdenas was a member of Madrid FC's first-ever complete season, in 1902–03. A solid midfielder, he was nonetheless one of the several players who left Madrid FC at the end of 1903 to form their own club, Español de Madrid, among whom were Antonio Neyra and the Giralt brothers. Cárdenas played an important role in helping Español de Madrid win the 1903–04 Campeonato Regional Centro, hence qualifying to the 1904 Copa del Rey, which ended in controversy as they were unable to participate in the final, meaning Athletic Club were declared the champions.

=== Athletic Bilbao and Athletic Madrid ===
In 1905, after two years with Español de Madrid, José and Armando Giralt decided to return to Madrid FC, and Cárdenas followed them, but unlike the pair of brothers, Madrid's board of directors did not accept him back, so he joined Athletic Madrid instead, the Madrid branch of Athletic Club de Bilbao. Cárdenas stayed closely linked to both clubs, alternating between both sides. In 1907, the best players from Athletic and Unión Vizcaino came together to form Club Bizcaya, which was specially created to take part in the 1907 Copa del Rey, and Cárdenas was elected into the final cut, where he featured alongside the likes of Juan Arzuaga, the Sena brothers (Alfonso and Miguel), and Charles Simmons. He helped this team reach the final, where they faced his former club Madrid FC, and losing 0–1 thanks to a late goal from Manuel Prast.

== Presidency ==
In 1909 he became the fourth president in the history of the Athletic club. In the elections, he comfortably defeated the then-president, Ricardo de Gondra. It was during his tenure that the club managed to defeat Madrid FC in official competition for the first time in their history, doing so on 30 January 1909. However, the presidency of Cárdenas was not so triumphant, with the club experiencing poor sporting results, a weakened economy, and a decrease in the number of members. On 22 January 1911, when the team wore the red and white shirt for the very first time, since until then their shirts had been blue and white, the colors of their foundation alike the Bilbao team. In 1912, he was replaced by Julián Ruete.

== Honours ==
Español de Madrid

- Centro Championship:
  - Champions (1): 1903–04
- Copa del Rey:
  - Runner-up (1): 1904

Club Bizcaya

- Copa del Rey:
  - Runner-up (1): 1907
