= Enrique Varela (footballer) =

Spanish footballer

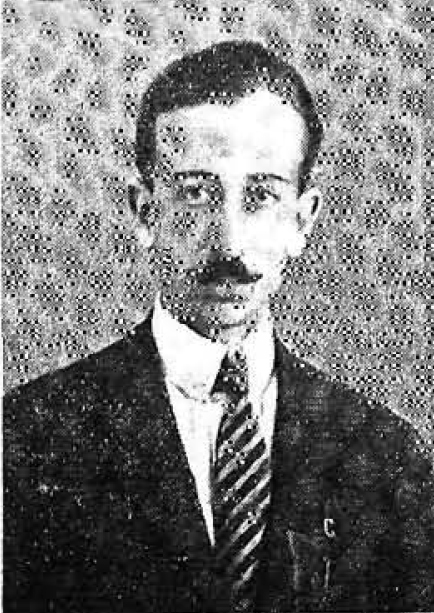
- Enrique Varela in 1915

Personal information
- Full name: Enrique Varela de Seijas
- Date of birth: Unknown
- Place of birth: Madrid, Spain
- Date of death: 1930
- Place of death: Madrid, Spain
- Position: Goalkeeper

Senior career*
Years	Team	Apps	(Gls)
1902	Madrid FC		
- * Club domestic league appearances and goals

Enrique Varela de Seijas was a Spanish illustrator of the first third of the 20th century and a footballer who was one of the founders of Madrid FC, serving the club as its vice-president.

== Football career ==
Before his role as an illustrator, for which he was remembered, Varela was, together with Julián Palacios and the Padrós brothers (Juan and Carlos), one of the promoters of the foundation of Madrid FC in 1900. The period in which Palacios served as president remains clouded in mystery since some publications sometimes mention Enrique Varela de Seijas, who later became a famous cartoonist and engraver, as president. Although the club was founded in 1900, Madrid FC was not officially established until 6 March 1902, in a meeting held in the back room of Al Capricho, the Padrós family business, in which they formalized the first board of directors with Varela being named the club's first vice president under the presidency of Juan Padrós.

When Madrid FC endorsed a tournament in the capital in the May festivities which became known as the Copa de la Coronación, the forerunner of the Copa del Rey founded a year later, Madrid FC organized a series of matches at Tiro del Pichón as part of Madrid's build-up to the tournament, and in March 1902, Varela played in four of these matches, two as a forward and the other two as a midfielder. On 13 April, he participated in another preparatory match, but this time as a referee. On 2 May, Varela went down in history as one of the eleven footballers who played in Madrid's very first match against another team, a friendly match against New just a few days before the Copa de la Coronación. However, he was ultimately not selected for the Madrid squad that played in the Copa de la Coronación.

Varela then only played a further three matches for Madrid FC, two of which at the Concurso de Bandas on 25 and 28 December 1902, which were the greatest victories in the club's history, a 16–0 and 19–1 trashings of Moderno FC and Español de Madrid respectively; the goalscorers of these matches, however, remain unknown. His last appearance at the club came in a friendly against Internacional Foot-ball Club on 8 February 1903, which ended in a 4–0 victory.

== Illustrator career ==
Varela worked with his drawings for magazines such as La Esfera and, in general, for the Prensa Gráfica group. He also collaborated by illustrating books, such as two editions of works by the Valencian Vicente Blasco Ibáñez: La familia del doctor Pedraza (1922) and El rey Lear, impresor (1926), among others.

== Death ==
Varela died at the beginning of 1930, after suffering a prolonged illness, in Madrid.

== See also ==
- List of Real Madrid CF players
