= 1907 Copa del Rey final =

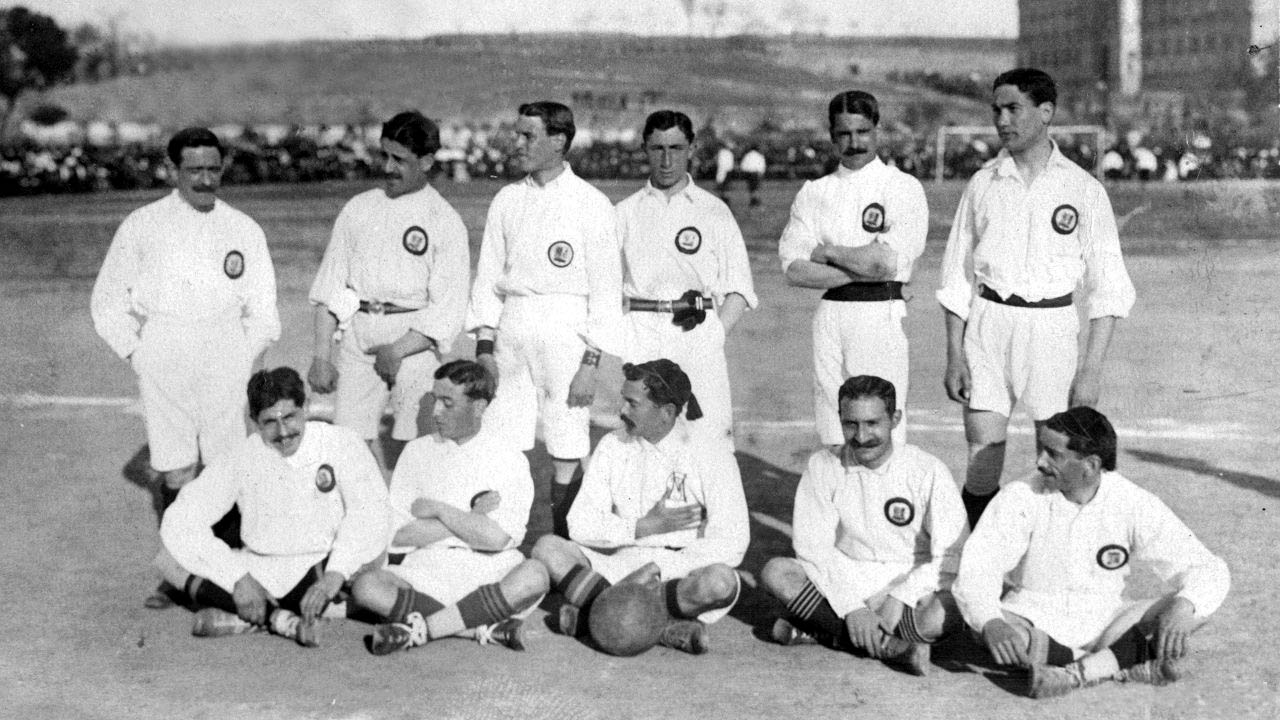
- Madrid FC, champions
- Event: 1907 Copa del Rey
Madrid FC	Club Bizcaya
1	0
- Date: 30 March 1907
- Venue: Hipódromo, Madrid
- Referee: (England) Sidney
- Attendance: 6,000

The 1907 Copa del Rey final was the 5th final of the Copa del Rey, the Spanish football cup competition. The match took place on 30 March 1907 at the Hipódromo, Madrid. The match was contested by Club Bizcaya and Madrid FC.

This match was not a scheduled final: the tournament was a round-robin tournament, but both teams finished with six points, thus forcing a playoff match to decide the champion.

Madrid FC lifted the trophy for the third time in a row, thus earning the right to keep the trophy. The only goal of the game was scored by Manuel Prast.

== Match details ==
30 March 1907
10:30 CET

Madrid FC	1–0	Club Bizcaya
Prast 80' (Note: Although most sources state that the Real Madrid's winning goal was achieved in the 80th minute, the newspapers of the time clearly indicate that the goal was scored in the first half.)	Report1; Report2

Hipódromo de la Castellana, Madrid
Referee: Sidney (England)

Madrid FC

Bizcaya

GK	(Spain) Manuel Alcalde
DF	(Spain) José Berraondo (c)
DF	(Spain) Joaquín Yarza
MF	(Spain) José Quirante
MF	(France) Enrique Normand
MF	(Spain) Manuel Yarza
FW	(Spain) Armando Giralt
FW	(Guatemala) Federico Revuelto
FW	(Spain) José Giralt
FW	(Spain) Manuel Prast
FW	(France) Pedro Parages

GK	(Spain) Fernando Asuero
DF	(Spain) Alfonso Sena
DF	(Spain) Juan Arzuaga
MF	(Spain) José Irízar
MF	(Argentina) Hermenegildo García
MF	(Spain) Ramón de Cárdenas
FW	(Spain) Tomás Murga
FW	(Spain) Benigno Larrea
FW	(Spain) Miguel Sena
FW	(England) Charles Simmons
FW	(Spain) Eustaquio Celada
