= New Foot-Ball Club =

Football club in Spain active between 1897 and 1903

New Foot-ball Club
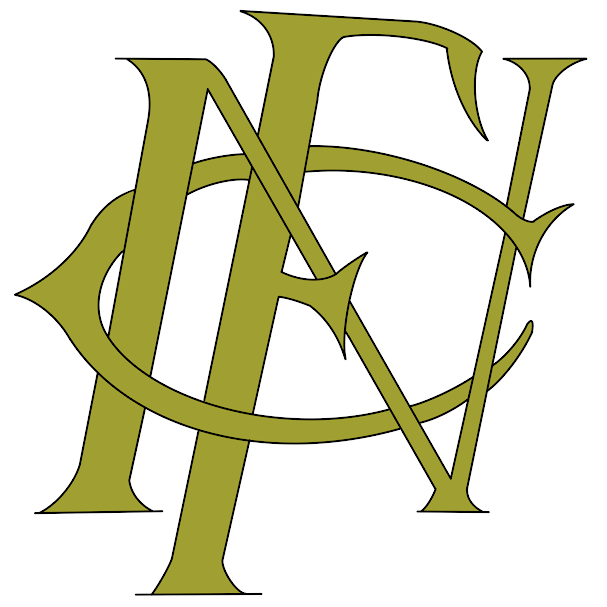
- Founded: 1897
- Dissolved: c. 1903; 122 years ago
- Ground: Tiro del Pichón
Home colours	Away colours

The New Foot-Ball Club, especially known by its original name of (Society) Foot-ball Sky, was a Spanish football club based in Madrid that was founded in 1897 by Cambridge and Oxford University graduates, and dissolved in 1903 due to internal differences and numerous splits in its 6-year history. In 1900, a conflict between Sky Football members caused some of them to leave and found a new club that would later become Real Madrid, and in 1901, a new split within the club led to the creation of Club Español de Madrid, and finally, in January 1903, a new and definitive split led to the disappearance of the club, with New's best players founding Internacional Foot-ball Club.

Sky Football is best known for being the first-ever football club in the capital with the sole purpose of practicing this sport, and it was until the year 1900, the only existing club legalized for its exclusive practice in Madrid. Their original name was Sky Football, but following a restructuring in 1902, Sky was renamed as New Foot-Ball Club, the name under which it competed in the 1902 Copa de la Coronación, the first national championship disputed in Spain and the forerunner for the Copa del Rey.

== History ==
=== Origins ===
New's origins go back to when football was introduced to Madrid by the academics and students of the Institución Libre de Enseñanza, which included several Cambridge and Oxford University graduates. For the Spaniards, football meant a distraction from the pessimism that was taking over Spain due to the loss of its last overseas territories at the end of the 19th century. Football became their best source for escapism and so, together with the British graduates, they founded (Sociedad) Sky Football in December 1897, commonly known as La Sociedad (The Society) as it was the only one based in Madrid, playing on Sunday mornings at Moncloa, one of the historical football areas of Madrid. Sky Football was thus just the third football team in Madrid, only after Cricket and Football Club of Madrid (1879) and the Outdoor Games Society (1897), which were the first sports societies that included the practice of football among their activities.

=== Supremacy ===
Sky began to play matches among its members to promote the new sport in the capital, and soon held its first meeting on 5 January 1898, in which a Board was elected, with Luis Bermejillo being named the club's first-ever president, and in which the club was officially established and legalized. Sky was thus the first-ever club in the capital with the sole purpose of practicing football, and it was the only legalized one until 1900, coexisting just with the Association Sportive Française, which was also born in 1897, in parallel to the creation of Sky, possibly due to the relationship between the students of Lycée Français de Madrid and those from the Libre de Enseñanza. Due to the limited extension of said sport in the country, there were still no proper or properly formed venues for its practice, so this group of football pioneers were distributed by different vacant lots and areas of the city in which the players themselves arrived early to paint the lines of the field and prepare the goals to be able to play their matches. One of them was in the vicinity of the Vallecas neighborhood where they began to train, but in 1900, they finally settled at the Moncloa field, located on what is now Vallehermoso street.

=== Instability ===
In 1900, three years after its founding, a conflict between members caused some of Sky's most important founding members to leave and create a new club, Nueva Sociedad de Football (New Society of Football), to distinguish themselves from the so-called La Sociedad. In 1901, this new club was renamed and officially baptized as Madrid Football Club. Said split, against which the then president, Ángel Mayora, could do nothing, was led by Julián Palacios, who is recognized as the first Real Madrid president, and supported by the Giralts (Mario, José and Armando) and by the Padrós brothers (Juan and Carlos), the latter two being future presidents of Real Madrid. On 6 March 1902, after a new Board presided by Juan Padrós was elected, Madrid FC was officially founded.

Undoubtedly, the instability of the club since its formation was what prevented its development, and in 1901, a new conflict between Sky Football members caused some of them to leave and create another new club in Madrid, Club Español de Madrid, which become the 1903–04 champion of Madrid and then went on to be the runners-up of the Copa del Rey three times in 1904, 1909 and 1910.

=== New Foot-Ball Club ===
The splits of 1900 and 1901 were two massive blows that placed Sky in a difficult situation, having serious problems of survival due to the continuous internal differences and marches of players outside the club. On 15 March 1902, Sky, who was almost without activity, decimated and with few players, suffered a new setback with the departure of some of its members to Madrid FC, who had just been officially established on 6 March in the infamous meeting held in the back room of Al Capricho. This led to a strong renovation in its structure, a massive restructuring within the club that included a change of presidency, with Manuel Vallarino taking over from Ángel Mayora, along with a change of name, from Sky to New Foot-Ball Club.

Vallarino's intention was to guide such a reformed club into reliving moments of recent glory, trying to achieve supremacy in the town and court, but the strength of Madrid FC, very firm in its foundations, prevented him from achieving it. On Sundays, these two societies would meet in their respective fields and dedicate themselves with true passion, to the dispute of matches between former partners and old friends. Coincidentally, both entities elect a new board of directors in the month of March, and new presidents, with Sky replacing Ángel Mayora with Manuel Vallarino, while Madrid replaces Julián Palacios with Juan Padrós. On 9 March, in order to form the team that will attend the Copa de la Coronación, both Madrid FC and New FC played warm-up matches between two teams made up of their members. In New's case, the match was held at the Tiro del Pichón, and was disputed by a team dressed in white, led by Ángel Mayora, and another in red, led by Manuel Vallarino, ending in a victory to the latter by 2–1. The Red goals were both scored by Vallarino while the White goal was netted by Ramón de Cárdenas, one of the players who left the club 6 days later on 15 March to join Madrid FC. On 16 March, these two sides met again in a match refereed by Fernando Valcárcel, and this time it ended in a draw at two. In the first half, the Whites took a 2–0 lead, but a brace from Manuel Vallarino, the Reds Captain and president of the entity, sealed the final result. On the 23rd the Reds won again by 3–2, with a goal from Francisco Hodans and two from Vallarino against the ones from Les and Mayora. On 25 March, the white team took revenge, winning 1–0 with a goal from Mayora. These games, were held to showcase the club's biggest talents so they could form a team which to compete in the Copa de la Coronación, with the most notable figures being Manuel Vallarino, Fernando Valcárcel, and Miguel de Valdeterrazo.

=== 1902 Copa de la Coronación ===
In 1902, New Foot-Ball Club was one of the 5 teams who partook in the 1902 Copa de la Coronación (forerunner of the Copa del Rey which officially began a year later), which was the first football competition at a national level in Spain. New faced Bizcaya in the semi-finals, and the match ended with a resounding 8–1 in favor of the Basques, with Montojo scoring the only New goal. After the final, which saw Bizcaya lift the trophy after beating FC Barcelona, it was decided that the losing teams would play a consolation trophy called the Copa de la Gran Peña, but New did not inscribe for the consolation tournament due to the very poor level showed in the Copa de la Coronación, and the tournament ended up being won by their neighbours, Madrid FC.

=== Decline and Collapse ===
After poor sporting results, chaos settled within the entity and the situation became complicated again. In 1903, as a result of the disagreements among its members, many of them decide to leave the club, including its president, Manuel Vallarino, who left for Madrid FC. This proved to be the ultimate split as the rest, unhappy with Ángel Mayora, decided to form a new club, the Internacional Foot-ball Club.

== Results ==
Unofficial

9 March 1902	Red Team	2 – 1	White Team	Tiro del Pichón, Madrid
10:00	Manuel Vallarino	Report	Ramón de Cárdenas

16 March 1902	Red Team	2 – 2	White Team	Tiro del Pichón, Madrid
	Manuel Vallarino	Report	V. Pérez de Pablo; Guillermo García Martino	Referee: (Spain) Fernando Valcárcel

23 March 1902	Red Team	3 – 2	White Team	Tiro del Pichón, Madrid
	Hodans; Manuel Vallarino	Report	Les; Ángel Mayora

25 March 1902	Red Team	0 – 1	White Team	Tiro del Pichón, Madrid
		Report	Ángel Mayora

Friendlies

2 May 1902 Friendly	Madrid FC	1–1	New Foot-Ball Club	Hipódromo, Madrid
	Sainz de los Terreros	Report	Manuel Vallarino	Referee: Carlos Padrós

23 November 1902 Friendly	New Foot-Ball Club	0–4	Madrid FC	Campo del, Retiro, Madrid
		Report	A. Giralt ? ? ?	Referee: Carlos Padrós

Copa de la Coronación

14 May 1902 1902 Copa de la Coronación	Bizcaya	8–1	New Foot-Ball Club	Hipódromo, Madrid
	Walter Evans; Armand Cazeaux; William Dyer; Juan Astorquia	Report	Montojo José López Amor; Bisbal, Mira; F. Hodans, F. Salazar, F. Valcárcel; Valdeterrazo, Montojo, Vallarino, Piñano, Díaz	Referee: (England) Samuel Morris

Concurso de bandas

23 December 1902 Concurso de bandas	Madrid FC	9–2	New Foot-Ball Club	Hipódromo, Madrid
	Neyra; A. Giralt 45'; Johnson; Parages; Neyra; J. Giralt	Report	? pen.' Romero	Referee: García

== Honours ==
Copa de la Coronación:

- Semi-finals: 1902

== Kit ==
The society wore a red blouse with blue pants according to publications of the time.
