= Julián Palacios =

Spanish mining engineer and businessman (1880–1947)

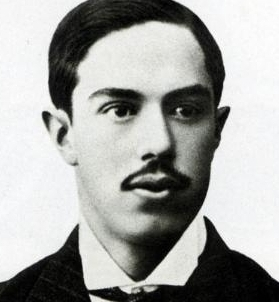
- Palacios in 1900

1st President of Real Madrid
- In office 1900 – 6 March 1902
- Preceded by: Office established
- Succeeded by: Juan Padrós

Personal details
- Born: 22 August 1880 Madrid, Kingdom of Spain
- Died: 27 November 1947 (aged 66) Madrid, Spanish State
- Occupation: Mining engineer, businessman

Julián Palacios Gutiérrez (22 August 1880 or 1881 – 27 November 1947) was a Spanish mining engineer and businessman who was recognized as the 1st President of Real Madrid from 1900 until 6 March 1902.

He was one of the first pioneers of football in Madrid, playing for some of the earliest Madrid clubs in existence, such as Sky Football, of which he was a member from 1897 to 1900. Following a breakaway in 1900, he helped form Madrid Football Club, which is now known as Real Madrid, and was its first president and captain.

== Biography ==
Born in Madrid on 22 August 1880 or 1881, Julián Palacios first became interested in the sport during his university years (he was studying mining engineering), when he would regularly meet up with a group of English friends. The main topic of conversation at these gatherings was always football (since the sport had already been established in England some years before). Football meant a distraction from the pessimism that was taking over Spain due to the loss of its last colonies at the end of the 19th century. Football became their best source for escapism and together with a group of friends, he founded Sky Football in 1897, aged just 17.

In 1900, a conflict between Sky Football members caused a split led by Palacios, which consisted of an important group of several of Sky's founding members, including the Padrós brothers (Juan and Carlos) and the Giralts (Mario, José and Armando). They left Sky to form a new club, effectively founding Madrid Football Club, which would later become Real Madrid, and Palacios unofficially presided over the newly established entity and its 50 members until 1902. It was common at the time for players to leave their respective teams to join or found others due to the still dispersed and confusing growth of football, in fact, a second split within Sky led to the creation of Club Español de Madrid in 1901.

His father-in-law, who was a well-known businessman of the time, gave him permission to use a plot of land next to the workshop of marble mason Estrada in the leveled area of Velázquez street, thus becoming the club's first playing field. As well as being the first president of the club, Julián Palacios was also the team's first captain and the first striker in the club's history.

Although the club was founded in 1900, Madrid FC was not officially established until 6 March 1902, in a meeting held in the back room of Al Capricho, the Padrós family business, in which they formalized the first board of directors with Juan Padrós being named the club's second president (the first officially). So, he left the presidency of the club and handed over responsibilities to Juan Padrós who was the man who officially established the club.

In May 1902, Palacios one of the eleven footballers who helped Madrid win the club's first-ever piece of silverware, the Copa de la Gran Peña, the consolation trophy of the 1902 Copa de la Coronación. In the following year, on 26 April 1903, he was a member of the group led by Eduardo de Acha that met the representatives of Athletic Club, who had just won the 1903 Copa del Rey final, to request permission to create the club's Madrid branch, Athletic Madrid, an idea that was very well received, and thus that club was born.
