= Enrique Varela =

Enrique Varela may refer to:

- Enrique Varela Vidaurre (1857-1914), Peruvian soldier and politician
- José Enrique Varela (1891-1951), Spanish military officer
- Enrique Varela (footballer) (died 1930), Spanish footballer and co-founder of Madrid FC
