= Antonio Alonso =

Antonio Alonso may refer to:

- Antonio Alonso (businessman) (1844–1917), Spanish businessman
- Antonio Alonso (footballer) (1885–1973), Spanish footballer
- Antonio Alonso Martinez (born 1963), Spanish painter
