= Outdoor Games Society (Madrid, 1897) =

Spanish football club

- Founded: April 1897
- Dissolved: Unknown
- Ground: Various

The Outdoor Games Society (Spanish: La Sociedad de Juegos al Aire Libre) is a multi-sports society based in Madrid, Spain, which was founded in April 1897, with the purpose of promoting outdoor sporting activity, such as athletics, cycling, and football. It was the first society (that we know of) dedicated to athletics in the country, and just the second football team to have been formed in Madrid only after the proto-club Cricket and Football Club of Madrid of 1879.

Local historians discovered about the existence of this society only years later, thanks to a piece of news that appeared in the magazine "El Veloz Sport" on 18 April 1897, with an almost exclusive theme dedicated to cycling, although it also mentioned other sports such as athletics and football.

== History ==
In April 1897, a group of outdoor sports pioneers wishing to promote and expand outdoor activity founded the Outdoor Games Society (Spanish: La Sociedad de Juegos al Aire Libre). According to El Veloz Sport, his first activity took place on 25 April 1897 and consisted of an excursion on foot, which went from Madrid to Alcalá de Henares, walking and/or running, and throughout the journey, they would make stops in different towns to play some football games. Because of this, the magazine presents them as a Society of Football Players and Hikers (Spanish: Sociedad de Jugadores de football y andarines). (Note: Andarín (walkers) is a term used before the 19th century and the beginning of the 20th to identify people who made long walks or races to go from one town to another to carry news or various objects, usually either as a postman or as a soldier. Later, some of these walkers became athletes, and they made their living by placing bets on any kind of adventure, on whether they were able to achieve some individual challenge or facing someone, other walkers, cyclists, horses or cars. Later, being a walker will be synonymous with being an athlete.) The Outdoor Games Society was thus the first in Spain for pedestrian sport, and by default, it was also the first known Spanish society dedicated to athletics. Some of the hikers returned to Madrid by train, while the most daring returned again on foot retracing the path traveled.

The Outdoor Games Society organized and played several football matches amongst its members and maybe even against teams formed by the residents of towns in which they walked by, thus being one of the very first football societies in Spain, as well as the second football team to have been formed in Madrid, only after the Cricket and Football Club of Madrid, a proto-club founded nearly 20 years before, in 1879, and proceeding New Foot-Ball Club, which was founded later that year by Cambridge and Oxford University graduates.

== Cycling–gymnastics connections ==
The organizer of the excursion remains unknown, but it is likely they were connected with the velocipede world of the time, since the Barcelona Cycling Society, for instance, also used to organize football games and other typically English Sports in the early 1890s, so Madrid might have followed their example. Quite possibly the organizers of the excursion were also connected with the gymnastic world of the time, as everywhere where there was a gymnastics club, the long outdoor excursions were frequent (mostly pilgrimages), and in fact, Jaime Vila, one of the most important figures in the amateur beginnings of gymnastics (and football) in Catalonia, used to organized excursions outside the city frequently, and just like the Outdoor Society, Vila also began to organize football games because it was the sport with the best chance of hatching among that generation of gymnasts due to football being an outdoor sport, which is also why most of the first Barcelona football clubs were born in gyms and under the protection and encouragement of characters linked to the Spanish Gymnastics Federation such as Vila and Narciso Masferrer, who played a huge role in the founding of FC Barcelona in 1899.

== Decline and Collapse ==
It is not known with certainty what the fate of this society was, although it seems that it disappeared a few years later.
