= Antonio Alonso Martinez =

Portuguese/ Spanish painter (born 1963)

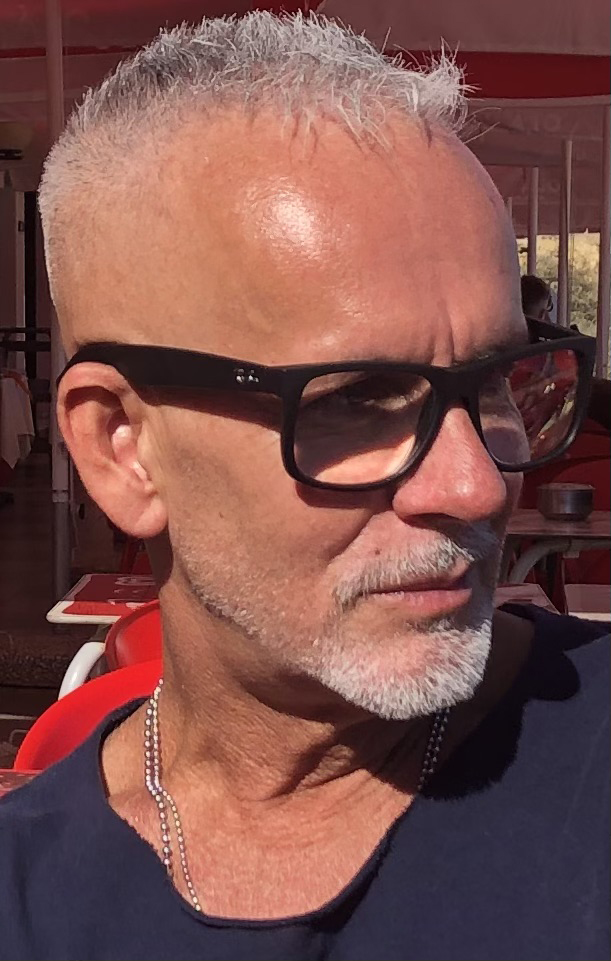
- Born: April 29, 1963 (age 63); Portugal
- Occupation: Artist
- Website: antonioalonsomartinez.com

Antonio Alonso Martinez (born 29 April 1963 in Portugal) is a Spanish painter.

Since the 80s, the artist argues that humanity will find their own spiritual reality. This has been the central theme of his work for more than 30 years.

Born in Portugal to Spanish parents, Martinez opted for the Spanish nationality in 1978. He studied Fine Arts at the Center for Art and Visual Communication, Lisbon, Portugal.

In 1984 was co-author of the Manifest of the Multi-instrumentalist Painting published in the Newspaper of Letters, Arts and Ideas on 26 June 1984. This manifest was accompanied by an exhibition at the University of Fine Arts of Lisbon, creating enthusiasm among the new artists and critics.

In January 2011 one of his work - Portrait of Kurt Cobain - reached the second higher value in the sale of Contemporary Art at the Austrian auction house Dorotheum. In September 2012 another portrait of Kurt Cobain by Martinez was sold at Christie's in London. In January 2013 in Warsaw one of his works - Diana - reached the highest value on auction at Forbes Millionaires Club.

== Diplomacy ==
In 2014, Martinez was a guest speaker at “The Madrid Symposium on Peace Building & Conflict Resolution - The Promotion of World Peace through Inter-Faith Dialogue & Global Political Discourse”.
