= Antonio Neyra =

Spanish footballer (1884–?)

Personal information
- Full name: Antonio Sánchez de Neyra Castro
- Date of birth: 16 March 1884
- Place of birth: La Habana, Captaincy General of Cuba, Cuba
- Place of death: Spain
- Position: Forward

Senior career*
Years	Team	Apps	(Gls)
1899–1900	Sky Football club		
1900–1903	Madrid FC	2	(1)
1903–1906	Club Español de Madrid		
1906–1908	Madrid FC	5	(5)
1908–1910	Club Español de Madrid	1+	
1910–?	RCD Espanyol	1+	(1+)
- * Club domestic league appearances and goals

Antonio Sánchez de Neyra Castro (16 March 1884 – Unknown) was a Spanish footballer who played as a forward for Madrid FC, Club Español de Madrid and RCD Espanyol. He was one of the most important footballers in the amateur beginnings of Madrid FC, being one of the main architects of the team's rise to national dominance in the 1900s. He was one of the members of the first Board of Directors of Madrid FC presided by Juan Padrós in the club's official establishment on 6 March 1902.

A notable goalscorer and dribbler, he reached the final of the Copa del Rey numerous times with three different clubs, but only won one. He was also an enthusiastic athlete, in modalities such as baseball, cycling, swimming, gymnastics, and discus throwing among others, even participating in the Spanish Athletics Championships.

His brother Pedro Sánchez de Neyra Castro, was one of the founders and the first president of the Spanish Football Federation in 1909 as well as the first president of the Spanish Velocipedism Federation in 1896.

== Biography ==
Neyra was born in La Habana, Captaincy General of Cuba, in Cuba, because his father, the cavalry colonel Don Antonio Sánchez de Neyra Romero, was stationed there, when the country was under the sovereignty of the Spanish Empire. They moved to Madrid when he was still young. In Madrid, he was part of the Sky Foot-ball club, the first club that existed in the capital. However, in 1900, a new conflict between Sky Football members caused some of them to leave (including Neyra) and create a new club, Madrid Football Club, currently known as Real Madrid CF, with the official creation of the club being held on 6 March 1902 in the back room of Al Capricho. Neyra was present that day and became a member of the first Board of Directors of Madrid FC presided by Juan Padrós.

He then become one of the first footballers of the newly formed Madrid FC at the age of just 18, playing as a forward. Together with Pedro Parages, Federico Revuelto and the Giralt brothers (Mario, José and Armando), he was part of the historic Madrid team that played in the first-ever Copa del Rey in 1903, and it was he who netted the opening goal in the final although they lost 2–3 to Athletic Club.

Despite some encouraging first steps in the white club, it was possibly the fact of losing the 1903 Cup final that caused a convulsive situation within the entity that led to the departure of several of its founding members, including him and Armando Giralt, abandoning Madrid FC in October 1903 to refound Club Español de Madrid (the club had already been founded in 1901, but collapsed in the summer of 1903) and of which he was named captain. It was common at the time for players to leave their respective teams to join or found others due to the still dispersed and confusing growth of football, in fact, some of the others departures marched to found the Moncloa Football Club. Under Neyra's leadership, Español de Madrid won the second Centro Championships in 1903–04, hence becoming the second regional champions in Spain after Moderno Football Club who had won the inaugural edition in 1903. In the 1904 Copa del Rey, Español de Madrid was unable to participate in the final, and so, Athletic were declared winners again.

He stayed loyal to Español de Madrid for three years, until 1906, when he saw that it was the "madridistas" - a nickname that would come years later - who began to have a notable growth both institutionally and sportingly, so he returned to the club that he had left in 1903, and participated in Madrid's 1907 and 1908 Copa del Rey winning campaigns, missing the final of the former, but redeeming himself by being the top scorer in the 1908 edition thanks to his goal in the 1908 final against Vigo Sporting, which ended in a 2–1 win.

In 1908, he headed back to Español, and from there to another back-to-back Copa del Rey finals in 1909 and 1910, Neyra's third and fourth in a row, but unlike in Madrid, both finals ended in losses, first to Club Ciclista in 1909 final and then to FC Barcelona in the 1910 final (FEF), and remarkably, he lost the latter in a similar fashion to 1903: being 2–0 up at half-time just to ended up on the losing side 2–3. Neyra then reached a fifth final in a row, now with RCD Espanyol, and just like in 1903, he lost to Athletic Club despite scoring in a 1–3 loss. It was in this club where the news of his sports activity was interrupted, suggesting he retired no long after that.

== Honours ==
=== Club ===
Club Español de Madrid

- Centro Championship:
  - Champions (1): 1904
- Copa del Rey:
  - Runner-up (3): 1904, 1909, 1910

-

Madrid FC

- Centro Championship:
  - Champions (2): 1906–07, 1907–08
- Copa del Rey:
  - Champions (2): 1907, 1908
  - Runner-up (1): 1903

-

RCD Espanyol

- Copa del Rey:
  - Runner-up (1): 1911

== See also ==
- List of Real Madrid CF players
