= Mario Giralt =

Spanish footballer

Personal information
- Full name: Mario Giralt Iduate
- Date of birth: 1882
- Place of birth: La Habana, Captaincy General of Cuba, Cuba
- Date of death: Unknown
- Place of death: Madrid, Spain
- Position: Forward

Senior career*
Years	Team	Apps	(Gls)
1897–1900	Sky Football club		
1900–1903	Madrid FC		
1903–19??	Club Español de Madrid		
- * Club domestic league appearances and goals

Mario Giralt Iduate (1882 – Unknown) was a Cuban-born Spanish footballer who played as a forward for Madrid FC. He was a member of some of the oldest football entities in Spain, such as Sky Football, Madrid Football Club and the Club Deportivo Español, being a founding member of the first two together with his older brothers José and Armando, who both had memorable careers.

== Biography ==
Mario was born in La Habana, Captaincy General of Cuba, in Cuba, when the country was under the sovereignty of the Spanish Empire. They moved to Madrid when he and his brothers were still young. In Madrid, he was part of the Sky Foot-ball club, the first club that existed in the capital, however, in 1900, a conflict between Sky Football members caused some of them to leave (including the Giralts) and create a new club, Madrid Football Club, currently known as Real Madrid CF, with the official creation of the club being held on 6 March 1902 in the back room of Al Capricho, a meeting in which the Giralts were present, and they become members of the first Board of Directors of Madrid FC presided by Juan Padrós.

He then become one of the first footballers of the newly formed Madrid FC, playing as a forward. Mario was part of the historic Madrid team; which also included Arthur Johnson, Pedro Parages, Federico Revuelto, Antonio Neyra and his two brothers, José and Armando; that played in the first-ever Copa del Rey in 1903, playing alongside his two brothers in the final, where they were beaten 2–3 by Athletic Club.

Following a conflict within the white club that caused the departure of several of its founding members, among whom the Giralt brothers and Antonio Neyra, they refounded Club Español de Madrid, a club founded in 1901, but who had collapsed in the summer. It was in this club where the news of his sports activity was interrupted, suggesting he retired no long after joining Español de Madrid, thus hanging up his boots considerably sooner than his two younger brothers.

== Honours ==
=== Club ===
Club Español de Madrid

- Centro Championship:
  - Champions (1): 1903–04
- Copa del Rey:
  - Runner-up (1): 1904

Madrid FC

- Copa del Rey:
  - Runner-up (1): 1903

== See also ==
- List of Real Madrid CF players
