= List of Real Madrid CF presidents =

Real Madrid Club de Fútbol is a football club based in Madrid, Spain, that competes La Liga, the top flight of Spanish football. Unlike most European football clubs, Real Madrid CF is owned and run by its members (all Spanish), called socios, since its founding. These members elect the president by a ballot, similarly to a limited liability company. The president has the responsibility for the overall management of the club, including formally signing contracts with players and staff. In Spain, it is customary for the Owner to watch the games in which the first team participates, together with the president from the opposing team.

Santiago Bernabéu remains the longest-serving president of the club (35 years, from 1943 to 1978). Current president Florentino Pérez won the most trophies (34). In July 2000, former Real player Alfredo Di Stéfano was appointed Honorary President of the club. Overall, the club has had 18 different presidents throughout its history.

== List of presidents ==
Below is the official presidential history of Real Madrid until the present day.

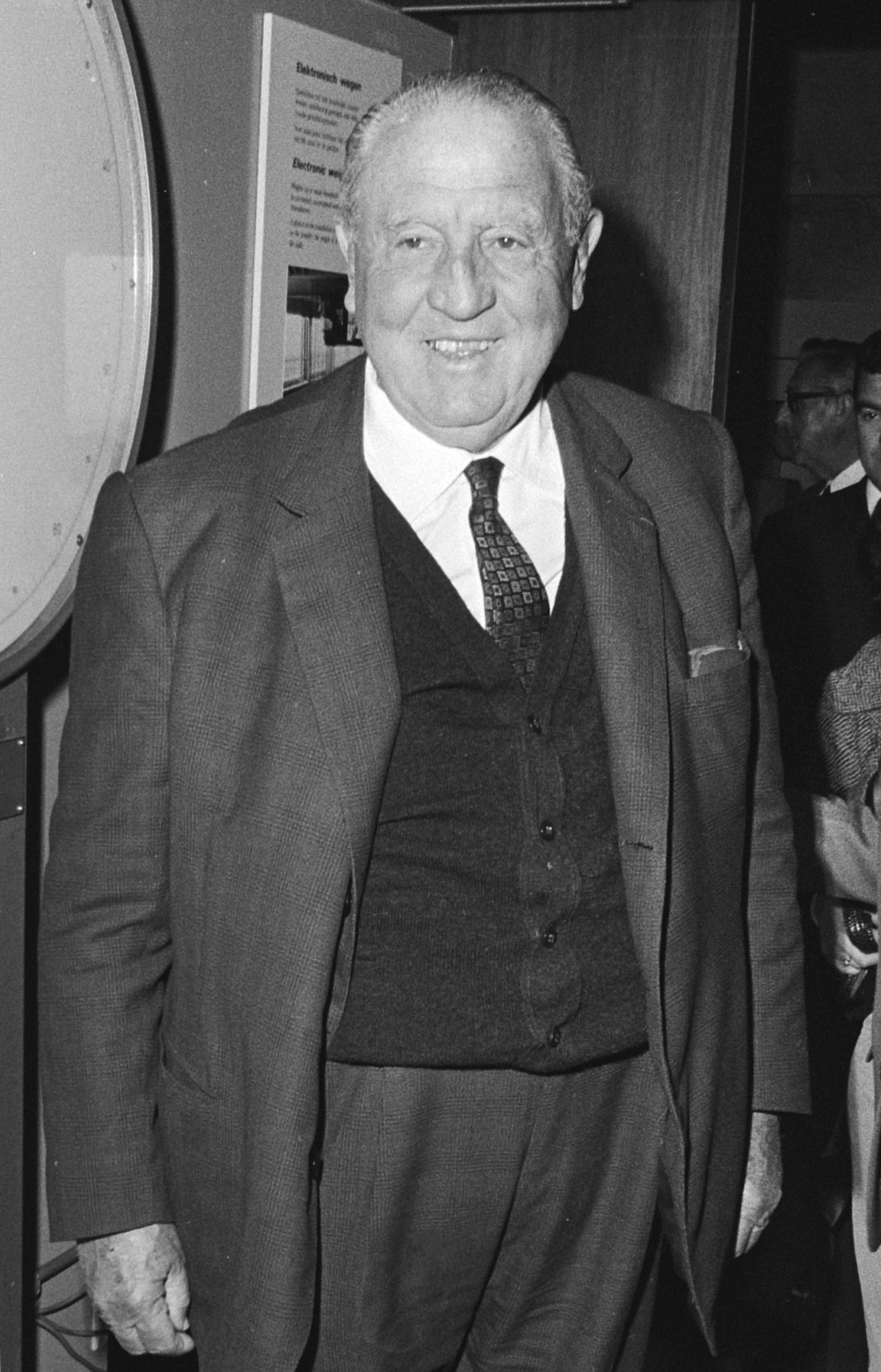
Santiago Bernabéu was club president for 34 years, 264 days and holds the records for longest serving president and most league titles won (16).

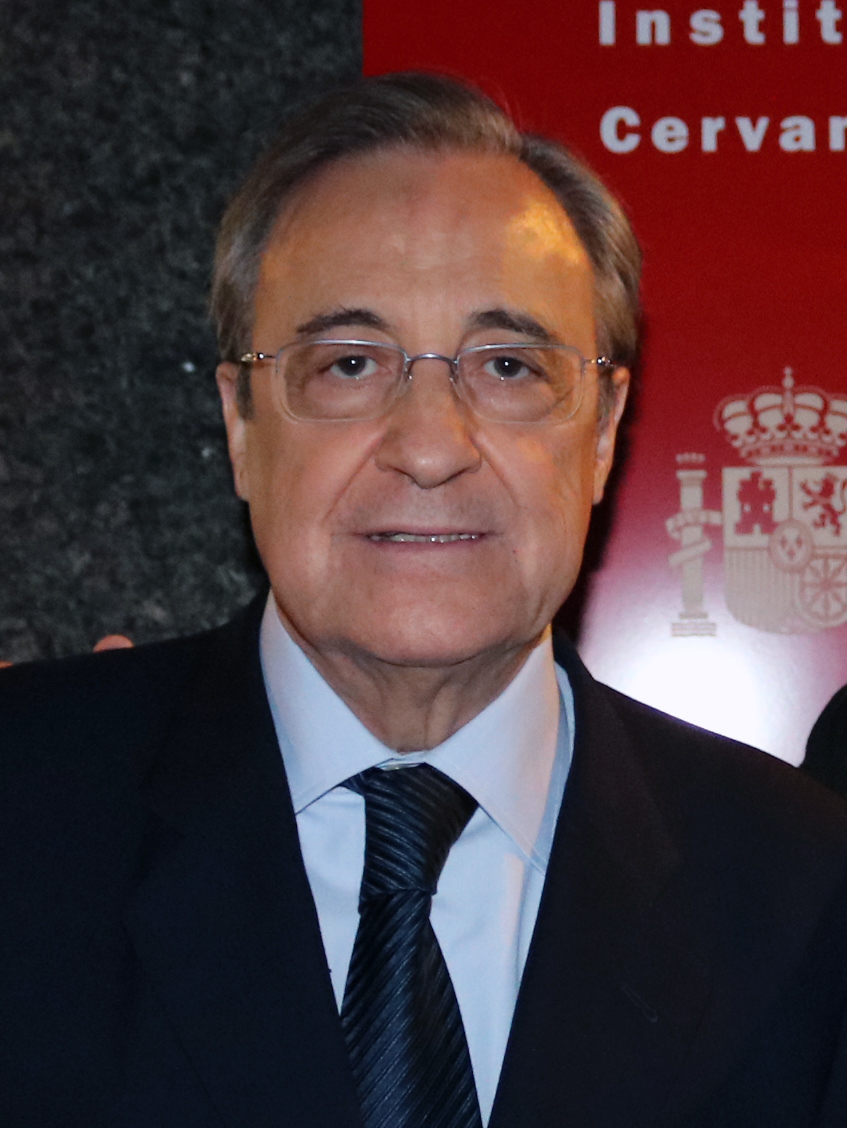
Florentino Pérez is the current president of the club and holds the record for the most trophies won (34).

Name	From	To	Years
(Spain) Julián Palacios	1900	6 March 1902	2 years, 125 days
(Spain) Juan Padrós	6 March 1902	January 1904	1 year, 301 days
(Spain) Carlos Padrós	January 1904	1908	4 years, 0 days
(Spain) Adolfo Meléndez	1908	July 1916	8 years, 152 days
(Spain) Pedro Parages	July 1916	16 May 1926	9 years, 349 days
(Spain) Luis de Urquijo	16 May 1926	1930	3 years, 230 days
(Spain) Luis Usera Bugallal	1930	31 May 1935	5 years, 150 days
(Spain) Rafael Sánchez Guerra	31 May 1935	4 August 1936	1 year, 65 days
(Spain) Adolfo Meléndez	4 August 1936	27 November 1940	4 years, 115 days
(Spain) Antonio Santos Peralba	27 November 1940	11 September 1943	2 years, 288 days
(Spain) Santiago Bernabéu	11 September 1943	2 June 1978	34 years, 264 days
(Spain) Luis de Carlos	September 1978	24 May 1985	6 years, 265 days
(Spain) Ramón Mendoza	24 May 1985	26 November 1995	10 years, 186 days
(Spain) Lorenzo Sanz	26 November 1995	16 July 2000	4 years, 203 days
(Spain) Florentino Pérez	16 July 2000	27 February 2006	5 years, 226 days
(Spain) Ramón Calderón	2 July 2006	16 January 2009	2 years, 198 days
(Spain) Vicente Boluda	16 January 2009	31 May 2009	125 days
(Spain) Florentino Pérez	1 June 2009	Present	17 years, 22 days

== List of honorary presidents ==
Name	Appointed
(Spain) Carlos Padrós	1908
(Spain) Adolfo Meléndez	1913
(Spain) Alfonso de Borbón y Battenberg	29 June 1920
(Francoist Spain) Santiago Bernabéu	27 May 1948
(Argentina) (Spain) Alfredo Di Stéfano	5 November 2000
(Spain) Juan Carlos I	6 March 2002 (Note: Honorary presidency only during the centenary year. Honorary President of the Club's Centenary.)
(Spain) Paco Gento	2016
(Spain) Amancio	2022
(Spain) Pirri	2023
