= Hipódromo de la Castellana =

Spanish horse racetrack in Madrid

Coordinates: 40.4451°N 3.6928°W

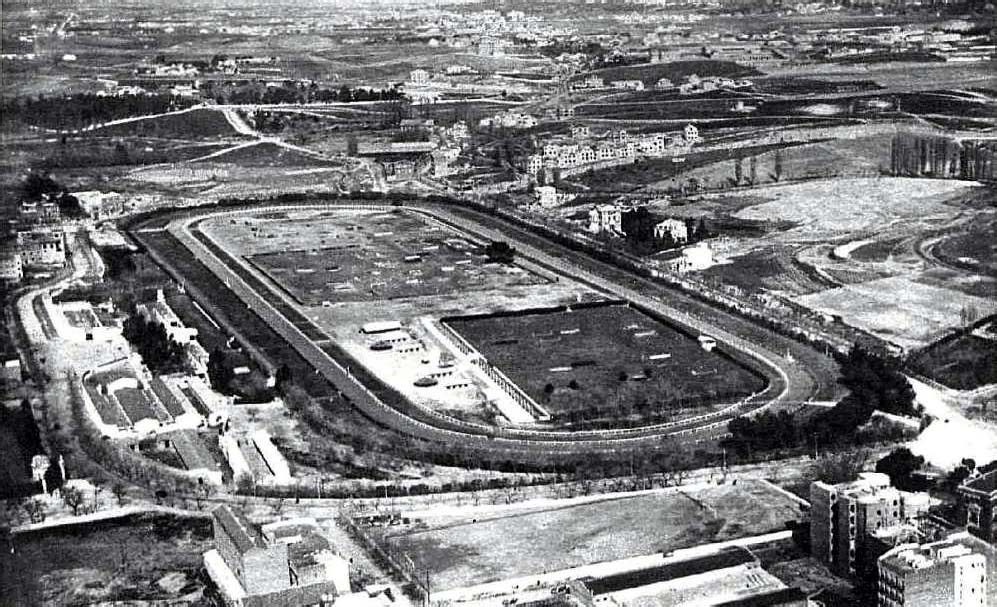
- The Hipódromo in 1930
- Location: Madrid, Spain
- Date opened: 31 January 1878
- Date closed: 1933; 92 years ago

The Hipódromo de la Castellana, also known as the Hipódromo de Madrid, was a sports facility dedicated to horse racing. Located on the Paseo de la Castellana in Madrid, Spain, it was designed by engineer Francisco Boguerín as one of the first official horse racing tracks in the city. The Hipódromo was inaguruated to celebrate the wedding of King Alfonso XII in 1878. In successive years, the venue also hosted football matches, mainly some Copa del Rey finals.

With the widening of Paseo de la Castellana in the 1930s, the Hipódromo was closed and then demolished. The site, now occupied by the office buildings of Nuevos Ministerios, was on the outskirts of Madrid at that time. During its years of operation it was the meeting place of the gentry and aristocracy of the time.

The main horse racing venue for Madrid, since the mid-twentieth century, has been the Hippodrome de la Zarzuela.

== Football ==
From the founding of Real Madrid CF (then known as Madrid FC) in 1902, the venue was the home of the club. As a football venue, it was replaced by the Campo de O'Donnell in 1912. The Hipódromo was by no means perfect. In order for the game to be visible from both sides of a field normally used for horse racing, the playing area was ridiculously large, and to make it worse, horse manure had been used as fertilizer, which in those times created a huge risk of tetanus; the venue was thus likened to a death trap.

During that period, the Hipódromo de Madrid hosted three finals of the Spanish Cup (1903, 1906 and 1907), the latter two of which being won by Madrid as part of their four successive Copa del Rey titles between 1905 and 1908. Notably, the venue also hosted all the matches of the 1902 Copa de la Coronación, the predecessor of the Copa del Rey. Furthermore, the Hipódromo de Madrid was the very first venue of a El Clásico match, when Madrid faced FC Barcelona in the semi-finals of the Copa de la Coronación on 13 May 1902, which ended in a 3–1 for Barcelona.

== Notable events ==
Matches at the Estadio del Hipódromo included:

- 1902 Copa de la Coronación Final (in honour of the coronation of Alfonso XIII, not regarded as part of the Copa del Rey, the Spanish football cup competition)
- 1903 Copa del Rey Final (the first final of the Copa del Rey)
- 1906 Copa del Rey Final
- 1907 Copa del Rey Final

== Other uses ==
In some cases air shows were held.
