= Armando Giralt =

Spanish footballer

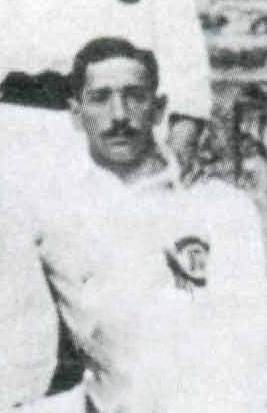

Personal information
- Full name: Armando Giralt Iduate
- Date of birth: 23 March 1885
- Place of birth: La Habana, Captaincy General of Cuba, Cuba
- Date of death: 21 April 1948 (aged 63)
- Place of death: Madrid, Spain
- Height: 1.74 m (5 ft 9 in)
- Position: Forward

Senior career*
| Years | Team | Apps | (Gls) |
| 1897–1900 | Sky Football club | | |
| 1900–1903 | Madrid FC | | |
| 1903–1905 | Club Español de Madrid | | |
| 1905–1907 | Madrid FC | | |
| 1907–1910 | Club Español de Madrid | | |
| 1910–1912 | RCD Espanyol | | |
- * Club domestic league appearances and goals

Armando Giralt Iduate (23 March 1885 – 21 April 1948) was a Cuban-born Spanish footballer who played as a forward for Madrid FC, Club Español de Madrid and RCD Espanyol. He was a member of some of the oldest football entities in Spain, such as Sky Football, Madrid Football Club and the Club Deportivo Español, being a founding member of the first two together with his older brothers José and Mario, who were also footballers.

He is best known for scoring the very first competitive goal in the history of the Real Madrid team against Espanyol on 6 April 1903. He reached the final of the Copa del Rey numerous times with three different clubs, becoming over the years one of the footballers who added the most presences in finals, winning two of them.

== Biography ==
Armando was born in La Habana, Captaincy General of Cuba, in Cuba, when the country was under the sovereignty of the Spanish Empire. They moved to Madrid when he and his brothers were still young. In Madrid, he was part of the Sky Foot-ball club, the first club that existed in the capital, however, in 1900, a conflict between Sky Football members caused some of them to leave (including the Giralts) and create a new club, Madrid Football Club, currently known as Real Madrid CF, with the official creation of the club being held on 6 March 1902 in the back room of Al Capricho, a meeting in which the Giralt brothers were present, and they become members of the first board of directors of Madrid FC presided by Juan Padrós.

He then become one of the first footballers of the newly formed Madrid FC at the age of just 18, playing as a forward. Together with Arthur Johnson, Pedro Parages, Federico Revuelto, Antonio Neyra and his two brothers, Mario and José, he was part of the historic Madrid team that played in the first-ever Copa del Rey in 1903, netting two goals in the opening match against Espanyol (4–1) on 6 April 1903, with the first of which being the very first competitive goal in Real Madrid's history. (Note: The goal scored by Arthur Johnson on 13 May 1902 against FC Barcelona in the 1902 Copa de la Coronación was the first scored against another team on a national level, but came in an unofficial competition.) He played alongside his two brothers in the final, where they were beaten 2-3 by Athletic Club. Those two goals against Club Español were enough to earn him the tournament's top scorer accolade tied with Juan Astorquia and Alejandro de la Sota.

Despite some encouraging first steps in the white club, it was possibly the fact of losing the 1903 Cup final that caused a convulsive situation within the entity that led to the departure of several of its founding members, including him, his older brothers, and Antonio Neyra, who left Madrid FC in October 1903 to refound Club Español de Madrid, a club founded in 1901, but who had collapsed in the summer. It was common at the time for players to leave their respective teams to join or found others due to the still dispersed and confusing growth of football, in fact, some of the others departures marched to found the Moncloa Football Club, against whom Español de Madrid made its debut, which ended in a 1-0 win with a goal from Armando. Español de Madrid won the 1903–04 Campeonato Regional Centro, hence qualifying to the 1904 Copa del Rey, which ended in controversy as they were unable to participate in the final, meaning Athletic were declared winners again.

After two years with Español de Madrid, he and José decided to return to Madrid FC in 1905, after realizing that it was the whites who were becoming the powerhouse in the country. He played an important role in the club's triumphant campaigns at the 1906 and 1907 Copa del Reys, featuring alongside his brother in both finals.

In 1907, he and José headed back to Español de Madrid, and they again reached back-to-back Copa del Rey finals (1909 and 1910), but unlike in Madrid, they lost both finals, first to Club Ciclista and then to FC Barcelona. In 1910, the two Giralt brothers and Antonio Neyra joined RCD Espanyol, and Armando once again proved his quality by reaching his third cup final in a row, which also ended in a loss to Athletic Club. In the following season, he helped Espanyol beat FC Barcelona to win the 1911–12 Catalan Championship. He retired in 1912.

== Honours ==
=== Club ===
Club Español de Madrid

- Centro Championship:
  - Champions (1): 1904
- Copa del Rey:
  - Runner-up (3): 1904, 1909 and 1910

-

Madrid FC

- Centro Championship:
  - Champions (1): 1906, 1906–07
- Copa del Rey:
  - Champions (2): 1906 and 1907
  - Runner-up (1): 1903

-

RCD Espanyol

- Catalan Championship
  - Champions (1): 1911–12
- Copa del Rey:
  - Runner-up (1): 1911

== See also ==
- List of Real Madrid CF players
