= Club Español de Madrid =

Football club in Spain active between 1897 and 1903

Español
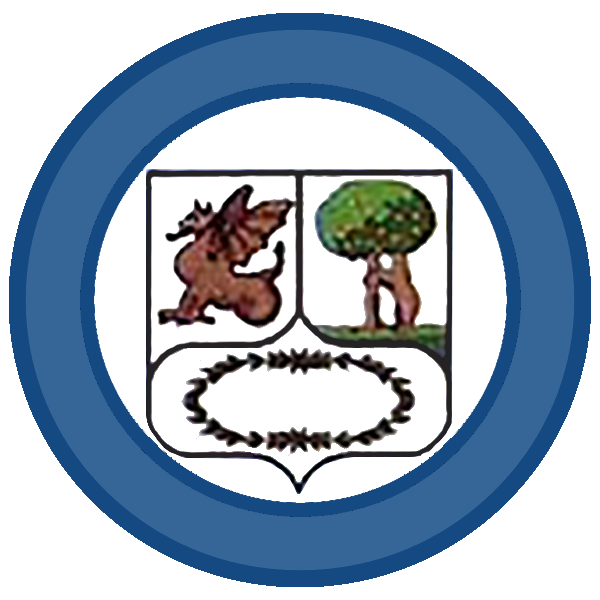
- Full name: Español Foot-Ball Club de Madrid
- Nickname: Españoles
- Founded: 1901
- Dissolved: c. 1913; 113 years ago
- Ground: Madrid, Spain
- League: Campeonato Regional de Madrid
- 1912–13: 3rd.
colours

Club Español de Madrid was a Spanish football club based in Madrid. The club was originally formed in 1901 after a conflict between Sky Football members caused some of them to leave and create a new club. Español de Madrid collapsed in the summer of 1903, but was refounded a few months later by players from a split of Madrid FC. Español de Madrid was subsequently the Campeonato Regional Centro champions in both 1904 and 1909, and reached three Copa del Rey finals in 1904, 1909 and 1910, which all ended in losses.

Club Español were one of several football clubs to emerge with a reference to Spain in their title. Others in Madrid included Sociedad Gimnástica Española de Madrid. Many similar named clubs also emerged in Barcelona—Hispania AC, FC Espanya de Barcelona, CD España Industrial, Club Español de Fútbol/Sociedad Española de Football. This latter club later became RCD Espanyol. Elsewhere CD Español de Valladolid later merged into Real Valladolid. There was also an España FC in Valencia and a CD Español de Cádiz.

== Early years ==
Football was introduced to Madrid by the professors and students of the Institución Libre de Enseñanza. They included several Oxbridge graduates. In 1897 they founded Football Sky, a club that played on Sunday mornings in Moncloa. In 1900 a split within this club saw the emergence of a new club that would later become Madrid Foot-Ball Club and a new split in 1901 resulted in "Club Español de Madrid". However, the club's lifespan was cut short when it was forced to cancel its activities in the summer of 1903, remaining unknown if due to disagreements, split or members leaving to form other clubs. The club was refounded a few months later, in October 1903, by several players who had left Madrid FC to form their own club, among whom were the Giralt brothers (Mario, José and Armando), Ramón de Cárdenas and Antonio Neyra, who become the first team captain of the club after its revival.

== 1904 Copa del Rey ==
In 1904 Club Español won the Campeonato Regional Centro, a regional league used as a qualifier for the 1904 Copa del Rey. However the subsequent competition, played in Madrid, ended in shambles. In the opening round Español de Madrid held Madrid-Moderno FC to a 5–5 draw. Both teams refused to play extra-time and a replay was arranged for the next day. However, Madrid-Moderno FC did not turn up and Español de Madrid were given a bye. In the semi-final, they played against Moncloa Football Club. With Club Español 1–0 up the game was abandoned following a serious injury to a Español de Madrid player, so they were declared winners and progressed to the final. Having tied one game and not completed the other, Athletic filed a complaint. Faced with this problem and unable to quickly solve the case, coupled with the rush of players from the Basque club to return to their occupations, the Madrid Association decided to award the cup to Athletic as defending champions.

== Copa del Rey Runners-Up ==
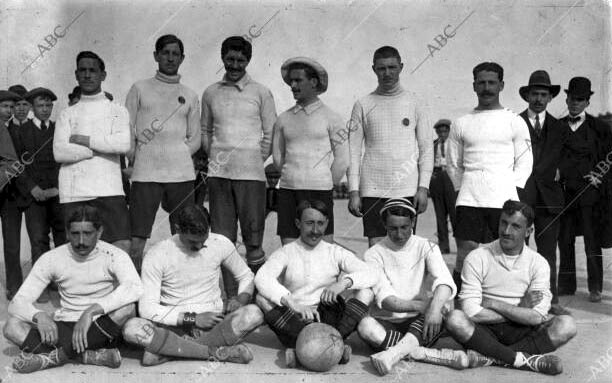
Team of Español in the 1909 Copa del Rey

Despite a two-year spell in Madrid FC between 1906 and 1908, Antonio Neyra become the team captain again upon his return, and in 1909, under his captaincy, Español de Madrid won the Campeonato Regional Centro for the second and last time in their history and thus qualified for the 1909 Copa del Rey. The team also had the likes of Armando and José Giralt, José Carruana, Antonio Morales and Manuel Yarza. In the semi-final they defeated FC Barcelona 3–2, but then lost 3–1 in the final to Club Ciclista (which would later become Real Sociedad), with José Giralt netting the Español goal.

In 1910 two rival Copa competitions were organised and Español de Madrid played in the Copa FEF along with FC Barcelona and Deportivo de La Coruña. It was played as a mini-league and both FC Barcelona and Español de Madrid beat Deportivo, meaning that the title was to be decided in the match between FC Barcelona and Español de Madrid. Neyra's team netted two goals inside the first 15 minutes thanks to a brace from Vicente Buylla, but FC Barcelona pulled off a comeback and won the match 3–2 courtesy of a goal in the last-minute from Pepe Rodríguez.

== Decline and Collapse ==
In 1911, Español de Madrid withdrew from the Federación Regional Centro, and thus from November to the beginning of the new year.

The last recorded record of a Español FC participation in an official tournament was in the 1912–13 Campeonato Regional de Madrid, where the team finished 3rd. It is believed that the club dissolved soon after.

== Honours ==
- Campeonato Regional Centro
  - Winners (2): 1904, 1908–09
  - Runners-up (1): 1909–10
- Copa del Rey:
  - Runners-up (3): 1904, 1909, 1910
