= José Giralt =

Spanish footballer

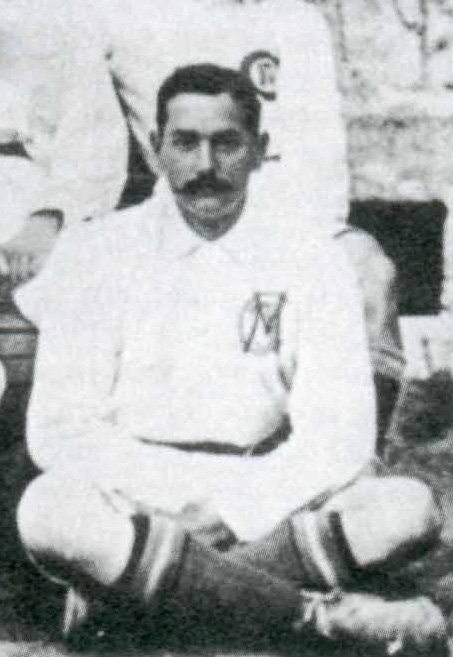

Personal information
- Full name: José Giralt Iduate
- Date of birth: 1 March 1884
- Place of birth: La Habana, Captaincy General of Cuba, Cuba
- Date of death: 24 January 1960 (aged 75)
- Place of death: Madrid, Spain
- Height: 1.80 m (5 ft 11 in)
- Positions: Midfielder; defender

Senior career*
Years	Team	Apps	(Gls)
1897–1900	Sky Football club		
1900–1903	Madrid FC		
1903–1905	Club Español de Madrid		
1905–1907	Madrid FC		
1907–1910	Club Español de Madrid		
1910–1912	RCD Espanyol		
- * Club domestic league appearances and goals

José Giralt Iduate (March 1884 – 24 January 1960), also known as Patache Giralt, was a Cuban-born Spanish footballer who played as a defender and midfielder for Madrid FC, Club Español de Madrid and RCD Espanyol. He was a member of some of the oldest football entities in Spain, such as Sky Football, Madrid Football Club and the Club Deportivo Español, being a founding member of the first two.

His brothers, Mario and Armando, also played for Madrid FC, with José and the latter being the most renowned and well-known, in fact, they nearly followed the same sporting path until their retirement. He reached the final of the Copa del Rey numerous times with three different clubs, becoming over the years one of the footballers who added the most presences in finals, winning two of them.

== Biography ==
José was born in La Habana, Captaincy General of Cuba, in Cuba, when the country was under the sovereignty of the Spanish Empire. They moved to Madrid when he and his brothers were still young. In Madrid, he was part of the Sky Foot-ball club, the first club that existed in the capital, however, in 1900, a conflict between Sky Football members caused some of them to leave (including the Giralts) and create a new club, Madrid Football Club, currently known as Real Madrid CF, with the official creation of the club being held on 6 March 1902 in the back room of Al Capricho, a meeting in which the Giralt brothers were present, and they become members of the first Board of Directors of Madrid FC presided by Juan Padrós.

He then become one of the first footballers of the newly formed Madrid FC, playing as a midfielder. Together with Arthur Johnson, Pedro Parages, Federico Revuelto, Antonio Neyra and his two brothers, Mario and Armando, he was part of the historic Madrid team that played in the first-ever Copa del Rey in 1903, playing alongside his two brothers in the final, where they were beaten 2–3 by Athletic Club.

After becoming one of the defensive pillars of the white club, a convulsive situation arose within the entity due to differences regarding the direction the club should take, and this conflict caused the departure of several of its founding members, including the Giralt brothers and Antonio Neyra, who left Madrid FC in October 1903 to refound Club Español de Madrid, a club founded in 1901, but who had collapsed in the summer. Español de Madrid won the 1903–04 Campeonato Regional Centro, hence qualifying to the 1904 Copa del Rey, which ended in controversy as they were unable to participate in the final, meaning Athletic were declared winners again.

After two years with Español de Madrid, he and Armando returned to Madrid FC in 1905, and they played an important role in the club's triumphant 1906 and 1907 Copa del Rey campaigns, featuring alongside his brother in both finals. In 1907, he and José headed back to Español de Madrid, and with them, he reached back-to-back Copa del Rey finals (1909 and 1910) again, but unlike in Madrid, both finals ended in losses, despite a goal from José in the 1909 final against Club Ciclista. In 1910, the two Giralt brothers and Antonio Neyra joined RCD Espanyol, and they once again proved their quality by reaching yet another cup final, which José missed likely due to injury. In the following season, he helped Espanyol beat FC Barcelona to win the 1911–12 Catalan Championship. He retired in 1912.

== Honours ==
=== Club ===
Club Español de Madrid

- Centro Championship:
  - Champions (1): 1903–04
- Copa del Rey:
  - Runner-up (3): 1904, 1909 and 1910

-

Madrid FC

- Centro Championship:
  - Champions (1): 1905–06 and 1906–07
- Copa del Rey:
  - Champions (2): 1907 and 1908
  - Runner-up (1): 1903

-

RCD Espanyol

- Catalan Championship
  - Champions (1): 1911–12
- Copa del Rey:
  - Runner-up (1): 1911

== See also ==
- List of Real Madrid CF players
