= Pedro Parages =

Spanish football manager and President of Real Madrid

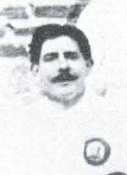
- Parages between 1905 and 1906

5th President of Real Madrid
- In office July 1916 – 16 May 1926
- Preceded by: Adolfo Meléndez
- Succeeded by: Luis de Urquijo

Personal details
- Born: 17 December 1883 Madrid, Kingdom of Spain
- Died: 15 February 1950 (aged 66) Saint-Loubès, France
Association football career
- Full name: Pedro Parages Diego-Madrazo
- Position: Forward
Senior career*
Years	Team	Apps	(Gls)
1900–1902	Association Sportive Amicale		
1902–1909	Madrid FC		
Managerial career
- 1923–1924: Spain (3)
- * Club domestic league appearances and goals

Pedro Parages Diego-Madrazo (17 December 1883 – 15 February 1950) was a Franco-Spanish footballer, manager, and the 5th President of Real Madrid from July 1916 until 16 May 1926. During his mandate, Madrid FC received the Royal title (Real) from the hands of the King Alfonso XIII.

He played as a forward for Association Sportive Amicale before joining Madrid FC (now Real Madrid) in 1902. Parages was thus the first French player to represent Los Merengues. Parages was one of the most important footballers in the amateur beginnings of Madrid FC, being one of the main architects of the team's football power in the 1900s and playing a pivotal role in the club's four back-to-back Copa del Rey titles between 1905 and 1908, playing in all the finals and netting twice in the 1906 final. After retiring he became the club's fifth president, a position he held for 10 years between 1916 and 1926. During that period he also coached the Spain national team at the 1924 Summer Olympics held in Paris, being eliminated in the preliminary phase in the only competitive match of the three that he was at the helm of the team. He is regarded as one of the most influential and recognized personalities of the entity.

His outstanding work in favor of the growing sport of football earned him in the 1931–32 season the recently inaugurated distinction of the Medalla al Mérito del Fútbol awarded by the Madrid Football Federation.

== Playing career ==
=== Early years ===
Pedro Parages was born in Madrid to a Spanish mother and a French father, from whom he adopts his nationality. The family businesses (textile) made a young Pedro complete his training in Manchester, where he studied commerce (Business). He was introduced to football in Manchester, developing a deep interest in the sport, and so, in 1900, when he returned to Madrid after completing his studies, he did so with great knowledge about football, which was only beginning to take shape in Spain.

Upon returning to Spain, he began his practice at the Association Sportive Française, later known as the Association Sportive Amicale, of the French Lyceum of Madrid, a club where he played for two years, until 1902, when he joined Madrid FC, who had just been officially established on 6 March 1902 in a meeting held in the back room of Al Capricho by the Padrós brothers (Juan and Carlos). Interestingly, the French high school team was absorbed by the Madrid team just two years later, on 30 January 1904.

=== Madrid FC ===
Parages became the first French footballer to wear the Madrid team's shirt, after his debut on 2 November in a friendly match against Moncloa Football Club held at El Escorial, in which he helped his side to a 2–7 victory for Madrid. He made his competitive debut with the club in the semi-finals of the first edition of the Copa del Rey in 1903, which took place on 6 April 1903 against the Club Espanyol, netting one of the goals in a 4–1 win, thus helping his side reach the cup's first-ever final, which ended in a 2–3 loss to Athletic Club.

In the following years, he won four consecutive Copa del Rey titles between 1905 and 1908, which still stands as the shared national record for consecutive cups. In the same way, and being the tournament that gave access to the national cup, he won a total of five regional championships of Madrid. He won a total of nine official titles during his career. Parages played a crucial role in the first great team in the history of Real Madrid since he was able to pass on to his teammates the knowledge that he had acquired in England about football.

In 1904, Parages became part of the board of directors chaired by Carlos Padrós. It was his first contact with the management tasks of the club. He hung up his boots in 1908 to devote himself to managerial tasks, although he played a few sporadic matches until 1909. In addition to his valuable contributions as a player, Parages was also the author of the club's rules and regulations, which he drew up from the experience he acquired in England.

== Presidency ==
In addition to being a great player, he was also a great patron for the entity, and his main achievement as such was getting the funds for the construction of the first proper football pitch the club ever owned, the Campo de O'Donnell, which opened in 1912, during his first interim presidency, but despite being only a short spell in the absence of the then president Adolfo Meléndez, it left a big mark in the club since O'Donnell allowed the exploitation of football as a sporting spectacle by charging money for tickets for the first time in the country's history. After a few years on the club's board, some of which as interim or transitional president, he finally officially accepted the position in 1916, becoming the entity's fifth president. His first year in office (1917) was a triumphant one, as Real Madrid won their first Copa del Rey since 1908, as well as the regional championship title.

In that same year, he was the architect of the acceptance of the word "soccer" by the Royal Spanish Academy, until then known as "football", due to its origin. It became "soccer" since then, despite the fact that historians and academics of the Spanish Language, advised in the most Castilian "football".

He was the great founding figure of the Real Madrid Club de Fútbol.

— Santiago Bernabéu.

In addition to O'Donnell, he also oversaw the construction of Campo de Ciudad Lineal in 1922, which was the first Madrid field with grass. However, Real Madrid was one of the most ambitious clubs of the time, and just two years later, in 1924, the club felt the need for a much larger stadium, and thus the Estadio Chamartín was built, moving from a venue with 8,000 spectators to another with the capacity for a crowd of 25,000 people. They bought the land for 642,000 pesetas, and once again, it was Pedro Parages, who together with José María Peña, Bernardo Menéndez and Carlos López Quesada, endorsed the amount. Chamartín opened on 17 May 1924 with a match against the professional Newcastle United, which the amateur Real Madrid players defeated by 3–2.

One of the most remarkable events during his presidency was the reception of the Royal title of "Real", given by the King of Spain, Alfonso XIII. Parages finished his mandate on 16 May 1926. Notably, he held the interim presidency again in 1928–29, until the election in 1930, which was won by Luis Usera Bugallal. He never renounced that dual nationality, something that prevented him, after the Spanish Civil War, from accessing the presidency of the club, since the authorities of the time banned this possibility to citizens with any nationalities other than Spanish.

== Managerial career ==
During his time as president of Madrid FC, Parages managed the Spain national team in 1923–24, coinciding with the 1924 Olympic Games in Paris. The team would be eliminated in the preliminary round by Italy after losing 1–0, thanks to an own goal from Pedro Vallana. In total, he managed the team in three games with a balance of one game won, one tied, and one lost with three goals in favor and only one against, Vallana's own goal against Italy, which was his last match.

== Death ==
His outstanding work in favor of the growing sport of football earned him in the 1931–32 season the recently inaugurated distinction of the Medalla al Mérito del Fútbol awarded by the Madrid Football Federation.

He was married to Nieves Gros Urquiola. He died on 15 February 1950, at the age of 66, in the French town of Saint-Loubès. He was the number one member of Madrid FC at that time of his death.

== Honours ==
Real Madrid

- Copa del Rey: 1905, 1906, 1907, 1908
- Campeonato Regional Centro: 1902–03, 1904–05, 1905–06, 1907–08
