= Federico Revuelto =

Guatemalan footballer

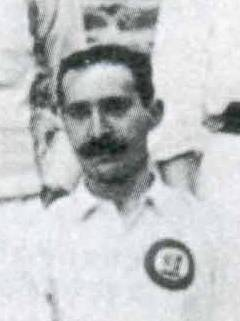
- Revuelto with Madrid FC c. 1905/06

Personal information
- Date of birth: 1883
- Place of birth: Cuyotenango, Guatemala
- Date of death: Unknown
- Position: Centre-forward

Senior career*
Years	Team	Apps	(Gls)
1902–1912	Madrid FC		
- * Club domestic league appearances and goals

Federico Revuelto (born 1883) was a Guatemalan professional footballer who played for the Madrid Football Club from 1902 to 1912.

== Early life ==
Federico Revuelto was born in Cuyotenango, Suchitepéquez, Guatemala in 1883.

== Club career ==
Revuelto initially started playing rugby football in England. He then switched to association football and joined the newly formed Madrid Football Club in 1902 at the age of 19, playing as a left-center forward. From 1903 to 1904, Revuelto served as the club's captain. He played in the 1903, 1905, 1906, 1907, and 1908 Copa del Rey finals, winning the latter four and scoring the first goal of the 1908 final. He served as interim president of Madrid FC in 1913.

Revuelto is listed in Real Madrid's "hall of fame" in the Santiago Bernabéu Stadium.

== See also ==
- List of Real Madrid CF players
