= Campeonato Regional Centro =

- Organising body: Madrid Football Federation (1903–13); Royal Spanish Football Federation (since 1913)
- Founded: 1903
- First season: 1903
- Folded: 1940
- Country: Spain
- Divisions: 1 (1903–16); 4 (1913–40)
- Number of clubs: 3–6
- Feeder to: Copa del Rey
- Relegation to: 1^{a} B División
- Domestic cup: Copa Federación Centro
- Last champions: Athletic Aviación (4th title)
- Most championships: Madrid / Real Madrid (23 titles)

The Campeonato Regional Centro (Spanish for Central Regional Championship) was an annual association football competition for clubs based primarily in the Castile region of Spain, including the Community of Madrid, during the first half of the 20th century. The competition was organised by the Madrid Football Federation and first held in 1903 as the Campeonato de Madrid (Madrid Championship) and renamed as the Campeonato Regional de Madrid (Madrid Regional Championship) for the 1906–13 seasons. The Royal Spanish Football Federation, founded on 29 September 1913, began organising the competition from 1913. It was called the Campeonato Regional Centro between 1913 and 1931, the Campeonato Regional Mancomunado (Joint Championship) from 1932 to 1936, and the Campeonato Regional del Centro (Regional Championship of the Centre) during its final season in 1939–40.

== History ==
The competition was founded in 1903 and run by the local regional federation, the Madrid Association of Foot-ball Clubs (Spanish: Federación Madrileña de Foot-Ball or FMF). From 1903 to 1913, it was referred to as "Campeonato de Madrid" and was open to clubs based in Spain.

In 1913 the Royal Spanish Football Federation (Spanish: Real Federación Española de Fútbol or RFEF) was established to govern competitions at the national level and the FMF was re-established as one of its regional branches, named Federación Castellana de Fútbol (FCF). As part of the country-wide reorganisation the competition was also re-established as "Campeonato Regional". In the following years it was one of the four regional competitions used as a qualifying phase for the Copa del Rey (which acted as the national championship of Spain until the foundation of La Liga in 1929). The four regional competitions were territorially organized as follows:

- Región Norte (Álava, Biscay, Gipuzkoa, Navarre and Rioja).
- Region Centro (Castile and Andalucia).
- Región Este (Catalonia, Valencia, Alicante and Murcia).
- Región Oeste (Santander, Asturias and Galicia)

With changes in territorial organization and several renamings (see below), these regional competitions were contested until 1940 when they were disbanded during Franco's dictatorship.

=== Format changes ===
From 1903 to 1913 the competition was contested by clubs from Madrid. From the 1913–14 season onwards it expanded to include teams from six neighboring provinces (Ávila, Ciudad Real, Cuenca, Guadalajara, Segovia and Toledo). The territorial format remained largely unchanged until the last season in 1939–1940, with minor changes listed below.

Seasons	Name	Notes
1902–06	Campeonato de Madrid	
1906–13	Campeonato Regional de Madrid	
1913–31	Campeonato Regional Centro	
1931–32	Campeonato Regional Mancomunado Centro-Aragón	Included teams from Aragon and Castile and León
1932–34	Campeonato Regional Mancomunado Centro-Sur	Included teams from Andalusia and Castile and León
1934–36	Campeonato Regional Mancomunado Castilla-Aragón	Included teams from Aragón, Cantabria and Castile and León
1936–39	Competition suspended due to the Spanish Civil War	
1939–40	Campeonato Regional del Centro	Included teams from Castile and León

== List of winners ==
Campeonato de Madrid

- 1903 Moderno
- 1903–04 Español Madrid
- 1904–05 Madrid
- 1905–06 Madrid

Campeonato Regional de Madrid

- 1906–07 Madrid
- 1907–08 Madrid
- 1908–09 Español Madrid
- 1909–10 RS Gimnástica
- 1910–11 RS Gimnástica
- 1911–12 Not held
- 1912–13 Madrid

Campeonato Regional Centro

- 1913–14 RS Gimnástica
- 1914–15 Racing Madrid
- 1915–16 Madrid
- 1916–17 Madrid
- 1917–18 Madrid
- 1918–19 Racing Madrid
- 1919–20 Madrid
- 1920–21 Athletic Madrid
- 1921–22 Real Madrid
- 1922–23 Real Madrid
- 1923–24 Real Madrid
- 1924–25 Athletic Madrid
- 1925–26 Real Madrid
- 1926–27 Real Madrid
- 1927–28 Athletic Madrid
- 1928–29 Real Madrid
- 1929–30 Real Madrid
- 1930–31 Real Madrid
- 1931–32 Madrid
- 1932–33 Madrid
- 1933–34 Madrid
- 1934–35 Madrid
- 1935–36 Madrid
- 1936–37 Not held due to the Spanish Civil War
- 1937–38 Not held due to the Spanish Civil War
- 1938–39 Not held due to the Spanish Civil War

Campeonato Regional del Centro

- 1939–40 Athletic Madrid

=== Performances by club ===
- Madrid / Real Madrid: 23
  - 1903, (Note: The 1903 championship was won by Moderno FC and was included in Real Madrid's trophies following their merger in 1904) 1904–05, 1905–06, 1906–07, (Note: In the 1906–07 season, Madrid FC won the tournament, but the Madrid Football Federation annulled the results.) 1907–08, 1912–13, 1915–16, 1916–17, 1917–18, 1919–20, 1921–22, 1922–23, 1923–24, 1925–26, 1926–27, 1928–29, 1929–30, 1930–31, 1931–32, 1932–33, 1933–34, 1934–35, 1935–36
- Athletic Madrid / Athletic Aviación : 4
  - 1920–21, 1924–25, 1927–28, 1939–40
- RS Gimnástica : 3
  - 1909–10, 1910–11, 1913–14
- Español Madrid : 2
  - 1903-04, 1908–09
- Racing Madrid : 2
  - 1914–15, 1918–19

== 1903 ==
Pos	Team	Pld	W	D	L	GF	GA	GD	Pts
1	Moderno FC (C)	2	2	0	0	9	1	+8	4
2	Madrid FC	2	1	0	1	9	3	+6	2
3	Moncloa FC	2	1	0	1	4	4	0	2
4	Iberia FC	2	0	0	2	0	14	−14	0

Source: Rec.Sport.Soccer Statistics Foundation
Rules for classification: 1) points; 2) goal difference; 3) number of goals scored.
(C) Champions

== 1903–04 ==
The 1903–04 Campeonato de Madrid served as a qualifier to determine who would represent the Community of Madrid in the 1903 Copa del Rey. Originally, Madrid was to be represented by the winner of a preliminary round between Club Español de Madrid and Madrid-Moderno (a merger of Madrid FC and Moderno FC). Then two more teams from Madrid, Moncloa FC and Iberia Football Club, were admitted in the competition, forcing a change to the schedule.

13 March 1904 Semifinals	Moncloa FC	4–0	Iberia FC	Tiro del Pichón, Madrid

19 March 1904 Semifinals	Madrid–Moderno	5–5	Español Madrid	Tiro del Pichón, Madrid
	M. Yarza (?); Parages (?); Revuelto (?); Alonso (?)	Report	? (?) ? (?) ? (?) ? (?) ? (?)	Referee: Ángel Garrido

The match between Club Español de Madrid and Madrid-Moderno ended in a 5–5 draw. The captains of both teams agreed not to play extra-time, but failed to reach an agreement on when they should replay the match. Español wanted to play the next day, but Madrid-Moderno refused, citing the rules of the tournament which stated that a replay could not be played less than 48 hours after the previous game. The next day Club Español went to replay the match, but Madrid-Moderno did not appear. The regional federation, whose president Ceferino Avecilla happened to be president of Club Español as well, ruled in favor of Español, and they were declared winners of the match eliminating Madrid-Moderno from the competition.

25 March 1904 Final	Español Madrid	1–0	Iberia FC	Tiro del Pichón, Madrid

== 1904–05 ==
The 1904–05 Campeonato de Madrid was played as a single elimination match between Madrid FC and Moncloa FC, with the winner representing Madrid in the 1904 Copa del Rey.

2 April 1905 Final	Madrid FC	2–0	Moncloa FC	Av. Plaza de Toros, Madrid
		Report		Referee: Javier Prado
Note: The match barely lasted thirty-five minutes, as Moncloa players left the field upset with the arbitration of Prado (goalkeeper of Athletic Club Sucursal de Madrid).

== 1905–06 ==
The 1905–06 Campeonato de Madrid was played as a single elimination match between Madrid FC and FC Internacional, with the winner representing Madrid in the 1906 Copa del Rey.

25 March 1906 Final	Madrid	7–0	Internacional	Hipódromo, Madrid
	J. Giralt 5'; Revuelto ? ? ? ? ?	Report		Referee: Álvarez

== 1906–07 ==
The Madrid Football Federation suspended the results of the 1906–07 season's matches for breach of norms.

2 December 1906	Madrid FC	2–1	Athletic Club Sucursal de Madrid	Madrid
	Zamora; J.Yarza	Report	?

2 December 1906	Moncloa FC	v	Iris FC	Madrid
Note: The match was awarded to Moncloa.

== 1907–08 ==
Pos	Team	Pld	W	D	L	GF	GA	GD	Pts	Qualification
1	Madrid (C, Q)	6	4	1	1	15	4	+11	9 (Note: Madrid FC failed to appear for their first match against Athletic Club de Madrid and forfeited the match as a result.)	Qualification for the Copa del Rey
2	RS Gimnástica	6	3	2	1	14	11	+3	8	
3	Athletic Madrid	6	3	1	2	3	6	−3	7	
4	Español Madrid	6	0	0	6	2	15	−13	0 (Note: Español de Madrid retired at half time in their match against Madrid FC with the score 3–0 in the latter's favour. The club also failed to appear in their scheduled match against Athletic Club de Madrid. Español de Madrid ceded points for both matches.)	

Source: Rec.Sport.Soccer Statistics Foundation
Rules for classification: 1) points; 2) goal difference; 3) number of goals scored.
(C) Champions; (Q) Qualified for the phase indicated

== 1908–09 ==
Pos	Team	Pld	W	D	L	GF	GA	GD	Pts	Qualification
1	Español Madrid (C, Q)	3	3	0	0	5	1	+4	6	Qualification for the Copa del Rey
2	Athletic Madrid	3	1	0	2	5	5	0	2	
3	Madrid	3	1	0	2	4	5	−1	2	
4	RS Gimnástica	3	1	0	2	5	8	−3	2	

Source: Rec.Sport.Soccer Statistics Foundation
Rules for classification: 1) points; 2) goal difference; 3) number of goals scored.
(C) Champions; (Q) Qualified for the phase indicated

== 1909–10 ==
Pos	Team	Pld	W	D	L	GF	GA	GD	Pts
1	RS Gimnástica (C)	4	2	2	0	7	6	+1	6
2	Español Madrid	4	1	1	2	6	6	0	3
3	Madrid	4	1	1	2	6	7	−1	3

Source: Rec.Sport.Soccer Statistics Foundation
Rules for classification: 1) points; 2) goal difference; 3) number of goals scored.
(C) Champions

== 1910–11 ==
12-03-1911 Madrid FC – RS Gimnástica 3-0

19-03-1911 Madrid FC – RS Gimnástica 0-2

25-03-1991 Madrid FC – RS Gimnástica 1-2

RS Gimnástica champion.

== 1912–13 ==
Pos	Team	Pld	W	D	L	GF	GA	GD	Pts	Qualification
1	Madrid (C, Q)	3	2	1	0	8	3	+5	5	Qualification for the Copa del Rey
2	Athletic Madrid	3	1	1	1	6	6	0	3	
3	Español Madrid	3	1	1	1	3	3	0	3	
4	RS Gimnástica	3	0	1	2	3	8	−5	1	

Source: Rec.Sport.Soccer Statistics Foundation
Rules for classification: 1) points; 2) goal difference; 3) number of goals scored.
(C) Champions; (Q) Qualified for the phase indicated

== 1913–14 ==
The Campeonato Regional Centro was organized by the Royal Spanish Football Federation from the 1913–14 season. Teams were split into two divisions - 1^{a} categoría A (1st category A) and 1^{a} categoría B (1st category B). Madrid FC, Athletic Madrid and RS Gimnástica Española were placed in 1st category A and Unión Sporting, Regional FC, Credut Lyonnais, Cardenal Cisneros were placed in 1st category B. There was no system of promotion or relegation between the divisions.

Pos	Team	Pld	W	D	L	GF	GA	GD	Pts	Qualification
1	RS Gimnástica (C, Q)	4	2	2	0	5	2	+3	6	Qualification for the Copa del Rey
2	Athletic Madrid	4	1	1	2	3	4	−1	3	
3	Madrid	4	1	1	2	3	5	−2	3	

Source: Rec.Sport.Soccer Statistics Foundation
Rules for classification: 1) points; 2) goal difference; 3) number of goals scored.
(C) Champions; (Q) Qualified for the phase indicated

== 1914–15 ==
Newly founded Racing de Madrid was added to the Campeonato Regional Centro top division for the 1914–15 season.

Pos	Team	Pld	W	D	L	GF	GA	GD	Pts	Qualification
1	Racing Madrid (C)	6	3	2	1	13	6	+7	8	
2	Madrid	6	2	3	1	10	9	+1	7	
3	RS Gimnástica (Q)	6	2	2	2	13	10	+3	6	Qualified for the Copa del Rey. (Note: RFEF regulations did not permit Racing de Madrid to participate in the Copa del Rey. RS Gimnástica was selected to represent the Community of Madrid in the Copa del Rey by the Federation, despite Madrid FC finishing higher.)
4	Athletic Madrid	6	1	1	4	6	17	−11	3	

Source: Rec.Sport.Soccer Statistics Foundation
Rules for classification: 1) points; 2) goal difference; 3) number of goals scored.
(C) Champions; (Q) Qualified for the phase indicated

== 1915–16 ==
Pos	Team	Pld	W	D	L	GF	GA	GD	Pts	Qualification
1	Madrid (C, Q)	6	5	0	1	15	5	+10	10	Qualification for the Copa del Rey.
2	Racing Madrid	6	4	0	2	15	7	+8	8	
3	Athletic Madrid	6	3	0	3	11	8	+3	6	
4	RS Gimnástica	6	0	0	6	1	22	−21	0	

Source: Rec.Sport.Soccer Statistics Foundation
Rules for classification: 1) points; 2) goal difference; 3) number of goals scored.
(C) Champions; (Q) Qualified for the phase indicated

== 1916–17 ==
This was the first season in which a club was promoted to the first division from the second division. Stadium FC won the 1st category B at the end of the 1916–17 season and following the play-off matches, the club secured promotion to 1st category A for the 1917–18 season.

Pos	Team	Pld	W	D	L	GF	GA	GD	Pts	Qualification
1	Madrid (C, Q)	6	6	0	0	28	8	+20	12	Qualification for the Copa del Rey.
2	Athletic Madrid	6	3	0	3	8	8	0	6	
3	Racing Madrid	6	2	0	4	7	14	−7	4	
4	RS Gimnástica (R)	6	1	0	5	5	18	−13	2	Qualification for the relegation play-offs

Source: Rec.Sport.Soccer Statistics Foundation
Rules for classification: 1) points; 2) goal difference; 3) number of goals scored.
(C) Champions; (Q) Qualified for the phase indicated; (R) Relegated

== 1917–18 ==
A third division below the 1st category B, called 2ª Preferente (2nd Preferential) was introduced for the 1917–18 season. The division included Recreativo Español, Madrid FC's third reserve team, and Unión SC's second reserve team.

This was the first season in which a club was relegated to the second division. Stadium FC, who had been newly promoted to the 1st category A, finished at the bottom of the table qualifying for the relegation play-offs with Unión SC, winner of the 1st category B. Unión SC won two of the three play-off matches between the teams earning promotion to the 1st category A, while Stadium FC was relegated to 1st category B for the 1918–19 season.

Pos	Team	Pld	W	D	L	GF	GA	GD	Pts	Qualification or relegation
1	Madrid (C, Q)	6	5	0	1	13	8	+5	10	Qualification for the Copa del Rey.
2	Athletic Madrid	6	4	0	2	16	10	+6	8	
3	Racing Madrid	6	3	0	3	6	6	0	6	
4	Stadium (R)	6	0	0	6	8	19	−11	0	Qualification for the relegation play-offs

Source: Rec.Sport.Soccer Statistics Foundation
Rules for classification: 1) points; 2) goal difference; 3) number of goals scored.
(C) Champions; (Q) Qualified for the phase indicated; (R) Relegated

== 1918–19 ==
Pos	Team	Pld	W	D	L	GF	GA	GD	Pts	Qualification
1	Racing Madrid (C, Q)	8	7	1	0	36	5	+31	15	Qualification for the Copa del Rey.
2	Madrid	8	5	1	2	20	15	+5	11	
3	RS Gimnástica	8	2	3	3	10	13	−3	7	
4	Athletic Madrid	8	2	1	5	7	19	−12	5	
5	Unión SC	8	1	0	7	8	29	−21	2	Qualification for the relegation play-offs

Source: Rec.Sport.Soccer Statistics Foundation
Rules for classification: 1) points; 2) goal difference; 3) number of goals scored.
(C) Champions; (Q) Qualified for the phase indicated

== 1919–20 ==
Pos	Team	Pld	W	D	L	GF	GA	GD	Pts	Qualification
1	Madrid (C, Q)	6	4	1	1	17	7	+10	9	Qualification for the Copa del Rey.
2	Athletic Madrid	6	3	2	1	16	11	+5	8	
3	Racing Madrid	6	2	3	1	16	7	+9	7	
4	RS Gimnástica	6	0	0	6	3	27	−24	0	

Source: Rec.Sport.Soccer Statistics Foundation
Rules for classification: 1) points; 2) goal difference; 3) number of goals scored.
(C) Champions; (Q) Qualified for the phase indicated

== 1920–21 ==
Pos	Team	Pld	W	D	L	GF	GA	GD	Pts	Qualification
1	Athletic Madrid (C, Q)	6	5	1	0	13	3	+10	11	Qualification for the Copa del Rey.
2	Racing Madrid	6	3	1	2	11	7	+4	7	
3	Real Madrid	6	2	1	3	14	9	+5	5	
4	RS Gimnástica	6	0	1	5	3	22	−19	1	

Source: Rec.Sport.Soccer Statistics Foundation
Rules for classification: 1) points; 2) goal difference; 3) number of goals scored.
(C) Champions; (Q) Qualified for the phase indicated

== 1921–22 ==
Pos	Team	Pld	W	D	L	GF	GA	GD	Pts	Qualification
1	Real Madrid (C, Q)	6	5	1	0	28	5	+23	11	Qualification for the Copa del Rey.
2	Athletic Madrid	6	4	1	1	24	11	+13	9	
3	Racing Madrid	6	1	0	5	10	28	−18	2	
4	RS Gimnástica	6	1	0	5	10	28	−18	2	

Source: Rec.Sport.Soccer Statistics Foundation
Rules for classification: 1) points; 2) goal difference; 3) number of goals scored; 4) head-to-head.
(C) Champions; (Q) Qualified for the phase indicated

== 1922–23 ==
Pos	Team	Pld	W	D	L	GF	GA	GD	Pts	Qualification
1	Real Madrid (C, Q)	6	3	2	1	12	9	+3	8	Qualification for the Copa del Rey.
2	Athletic Madrid	6	3	1	2	12	10	+2	7	
3	Racing Madrid	6	2	1	3	13	14	−1	5	
4	RS Gimnástica	6	1	2	3	9	13	−4	4	

Source: Rec.Sport.Soccer Statistics Foundation
Rules for classification: 1) points; 2) goal difference; 3) number of goals scored.
(C) Champions; (Q) Qualified for the phase indicated

== 1923–24 ==
The Federation expanded the number of teams included in the first division to five and the second division to six from the 1923–24 season. Unión SC, winner of the second division in the previous season, was promoted to the first division.

Pos	Team	Pld	W	D	L	GF	GA	GD	Pts	Qualification
1	Real Madrid (C, Q)	8	6	2	0	21	7	+14	14	Qualification for the Copa del Rey.
2	Racing Madrid	8	3	3	2	13	13	0	9	
3	Athletic Madrid	8	4	0	4	13	11	+2	8	
4	RS Gimnástica	8	3	2	3	7	10	−3	8	
5	Unión SC (O)	8	0	1	7	8	21	−13	1	Qualification for the relegation play-offs

Source: Rec.Sport.Soccer Statistics Foundation
Rules for classification: 1) points; 2) goal difference; 3) number of goals scored.
(C) Champions; (O) Play-off winners; (Q) Qualified for the phase indicated

== 1924–25 ==
Pos	Team	Pld	W	D	L	GF	GA	GD	Pts	Qualification
1	Athletic Madrid (C, Q)	8	5	3	0	21	7	+14	13	Qualification for the Copa del Rey.
2	Real Madrid	8	3	3	2	11	6	+5	9	
3	RS Gimnástica	8	4	0	4	21	16	+5	8	
4	Racing Madrid	8	3	1	4	21	19	+2	7	
5	Unión SC (O)	8	1	1	6	3	29	−26	3	Qualification for the relegation play-offs

Source: Rec.Sport.Soccer Statistics Foundation
Rules for classification: 1) points; 2) goal difference; 3) number of goals scored.
(C) Champions; (O) Play-off winners; (Q) Qualified for the phase indicated

== 1925–26 ==
Pos	Team	Pld	W	D	L	GF	GA	GD	Pts	Qualification
1	Real Madrid (C, Q)	8	6	1	1	17	5	+12	13	Qualification for the Copa del Rey.
2	Athletic Madrid (Q)	8	5	0	3	22	11	+11	10	Qualification for the Copa del Rey.
3	RS Gimnástica	8	4	1	3	21	20	+1	9	
4	Racing Madrid	8	3	1	4	17	19	−2	7	
5	Unión SC (O)	8	0	1	7	5	27	−22	1	Qualification for the relegation play-offs

Source: Rec.Sport.Soccer Statistics Foundation
Rules for classification: 1) points; 2) goal difference; 3) number of goals scored.
(C) Champions; (O) Play-off winners; (Q) Qualified for the phase indicated

== 1926–27 ==
Pos	Team	Pld	W	D	L	GF	GA	GD	Pts	Qualification
1	Real Madrid (C, Q)	16	12	1	3	38	12	+26	25	Qualification for the Copa del Rey.
2	Athletic Madrid (Q)	16	8	2	6	31	25	+6	18	Qualification for the Copa del Rey.
3	Racing Madrid	16	8	1	7	33	25	+8	17	
4	RS Gimnástica	16	4	2	10	15	41	−26	10	Qualification for the relegation play-offs
5	Unión SC	16	4	2	10	18	32	−14	10	Qualification for the relegation play-offs

Source: Rec.Sport.Soccer Statistics Foundation
Rules for classification: 1) points; 2) goal difference; 3) number of goals scored.
(C) Champions; (Q) Qualified for the phase indicated

== 1927–28 ==
Pos	Team	Pld	W	D	L	GF	GA	GD	Pts	Qualification
1	Real Madrid (Q)	10	8	0	2	38	10	+28	16	Qualification for the Copa del Rey and the Copa Federación Centro.
2	Athletic Madrid (Q)	10	8	0	2	31	10	+21	16	Qualification for the Copa del Rey and the Copa Federación Centro.
3	Racing Madrid	10	8	0	2	31	15	+16	16	
4	Nacional Madrid	10	3	1	6	14	31	−17	7	
5	RS Gimnástica	10	1	1	8	12	33	−21	3	
6	Unión SC (O)	10	1	0	9	10	37	−27	2	Qualification for the relegation play-offs

Source: Rec.Sport.Soccer Statistics Foundation
Rules for classification: 1) points; 2) tiebreaker matches
(O) Play-off winners; (Q) Qualified for the phase indicated

Playoffs:

15-01-1928 Athletic Madrid - Racing Madrid 3-0

19-01-1928 Real Madrid FC - Racing Madrid 4-0

22-01-1928 Real Madrid FC - Athletic Madrid 1-3

Athletic Madrid champion.

== 1928–29 ==
Pos	Team	Pld	W	D	L	GF	GA	GD	Pts	Qualification
1	Real Madrid (C, Q)	8	7	1	0	30	8	+22	15	Qualification for the Copa del Rey.
2	Athletic Madrid (Q)	8	6	0	2	23	14	+9	12	Qualification for the Copa del Rey.
3	Racing Madrid (Q)	8	2	1	5	13	18	−5	5	Qualification for the Copa del Rey.
4	Nacional Madrid	8	2	0	6	16	25	−9	4	Qualification for the relegation play-offs
5	Unión SC	8	2	0	6	17	34	−17	4	Qualification for the relegation play-offs

Source: Rec.Sport.Soccer Statistics Foundation
Rules for classification: 1) points; 2) goal difference; 3) number of goals scored.
(C) Champions; (Q) Qualified for the phase indicated

== 1929–30 ==
Pos	Team	Pld	W	D	L	GF	GA	GD	Pts	Qualification
1	Real Madrid (C, Q)	8	5	1	2	24	12	+12	11	Qualification for the Copa del Rey.
2	Racing Madrid (Q)	8	3	4	1	20	14	+6	10	Qualification for the Copa del Rey.
3	Athletic Madrid (Q)	8	4	2	2	23	16	+7	10	Qualification for the Copa del Rey.
4	Nacional Madrid	8	3	2	3	19	21	−2	8	
5	Unión SC	8	0	1	7	9	32	−23	1	

Source: Rec.Sport.Soccer Statistics Foundation
Rules for classification: 1) points; 2) goal difference; 3) number of goals scored.
(C) Champions; (Q) Qualified for the phase indicated

== 1930–31 ==
Pos	Team	Pld	W	D	L	GF	GA	GD	Pts	Qualification
1	Real Madrid (C, Q)	10	9	1	0	34	10	+24	19	Qualification for the Copa del Rey.
2	Athletic Madrid (Q)	10	8	1	1	44	13	+31	17	Qualification for the Copa del Rey.
3	Racing Madrid (Q)	10	3	3	4	18	21	−3	9	Qualification for the Copa del Rey.
4	Nacional Madrid	10	3	2	5	19	22	−3	8	
5	Tranviaria	10	1	2	7	15	45	−30	4	
6	Unión SC	10	1	1	8	8	27	−19	3	

Source: Rec.Sport.Soccer Statistics Foundation
Rules for classification: 1) points; 2) goal difference; 3) number of goals scored.
(C) Champions; (Q) Qualified for the phase indicated

== 1935–36 (Campeonato Mancomunado Castilla-Aragón) ==
- Champion: Madrid FC

Pos	Team	Pld	W	D	L	GF	GA	GD	Pts	Result
1	Madrid	10	6	3	1	23	8	+15	15	Champion
2	Zaragoza	10	7	0	3	21	8	+13	14	
3	Athletic Madrid	10	5	0	5	22	21	+1	10	
4	Racing Santander	10	4	1	5	19	26	−7	9	
5	Nacional Madrid	10	3	1	6	17	27	−10	7	
6	Valladolid	10	2	1	7	17	29	−12	5	

== 1936 to 1939 ==
The competition was not held for three seasons due to the Spanish Civil War.

== 1939–40 ==
- Champion: Athletic Aviación

Pos	Team	Pld	W	D	L	GF	GA	GD	Pts	Result
1	Athletic Aviación	10	7	1	2	30	8	+22	15	Champion
2	Real Madrid	10	7	1	2	21	12	+9	15	
3	Ferroviaria	10	5	3	2	19	15	+4	13	
4	Salamanca	10	3	2	5	13	20	−7	8	
5	Imperio	10	1	3	6	9	19	−10	5	
6	Valladolid	10	1	2	7	6	24	−18	4	

== See also ==
- History of Real Madrid CF
- Madrid autonomous football team
