= Carlos Padrós =

Spanish politician, businessman and football pioneer

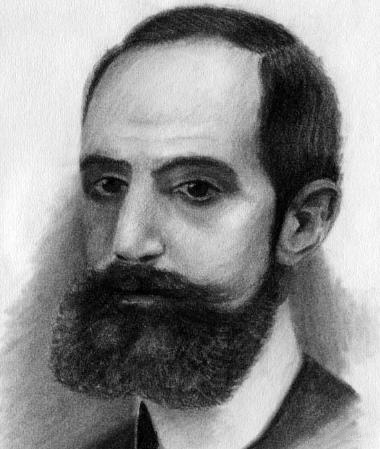
- A portrtait of Padrós in 1904

3rd President of Real Madrid
- In office January 1904 – 1908
- Preceded by: Juan Padrós
- Succeeded by: Adolfo Meléndez

Personal details
- Born: Carlos Padrós Rubió; 9 November 1870 Barcelona, Kingdom of Spain
- Died: 30 December 1950 (aged 80) Madrid, Spanish State
- Party: Liberal Party (until 1931)
- Occupation: Politician, businessman

Carlos Padrós Rubió, also known as Carles Padrós Rubió (9 November 1870 – 30 December 1950) was a Spanish politician, businessman and football pioneer who was the 3rd President of Real Madrid. He was a member of the Spanish Liberal Party until its dissolution in 1931.

Padrós was a founding member of Real Madrid and later served as club president between January 1904 and 1908, succeeding his brother Juan. He was also the driving force behind the Copa del Rey and refereed the first ever final.

== Biography ==
=== Shop Owner ===
Padrós and his brother Juan were born into a Catalan family living in Madrid. Together they owned a shop on the Calle Alcalá. Conflicting sources say it was either a fashionable women's boutique called El Capricho or a cloth business called El Encanto. The two brothers also became involved in the emerging football scene in the city. In 1902 the backroom of their shop became the first club premises of Madrid FC and Juan was elected the president of the club that later became Real Madrid.

=== Copa del Rey ===
In 1902, Carlos became president of the Federación Madrileña de Foot-Ball and while in this post he suggested a football competition to celebrate the coronation of Alfonso XIII. This competition eventually evolved into the Copa del Rey. It was first played for in 1902 and four other teams, FC Barcelona, Club Español de Fútbol, Club Vizcaya and New Foot-Ball de Madrid, joined Madrid FC in the first competition. In the final, refereed by Carlos, Club Vizcaya beat Barcelona 2-1.

=== Real Madrid President ===
In January 1904, Padrós succeeded Juan as President of Real Madrid. On 23 October he arranged the club's first game against a non-Spanish team. The opponents were French club Gallia Club of Paris, who in 1905 became champions of France. The game, which ended as a 1-1 draw, was arrange to celebrate the visit of French president, Émile Loubet. During his presidency the club also won the Copa del Rey four times in a row between 1905 and 1908. In 1908, Padrós was succeeded as club president by Adolfo Meléndez and on 13 April he was elected honorary president for life.
