= Juan Padrós =

Spanish businessman and football club president (1869–1932)

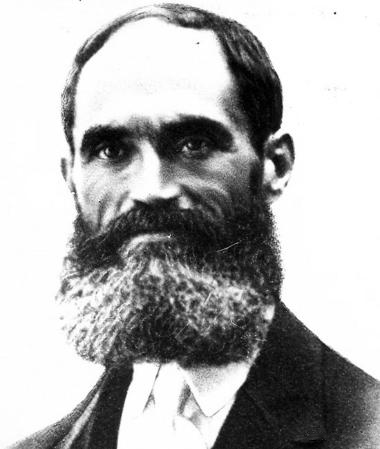
- Padrós in 1902

2nd President of Real Madrid
- In office 6 March 1902 – January 1904
- Preceded by: Julián Palacios
- Succeeded by: Carlos Padrós

Personal details
- Born: Juan Padrós Rubió; 1 December 1869 Barcelona, Kingdom of Spain
- Died: 11 May 1932 (aged 62) Arenas de San Pedro, Spanish Republic
- Occupation: Businessman

Juan Padrós Rubió (1 December 1869 – 11 May 1932) was a Spanish businessman who was recognised as the 2nd official President of Real Madrid.

He first took office on 6 March 1902, about 2 years after Real Madrid was created.

He remained as president until January 1904, when he was succeeded by his brother, Carlos Padrós. Both of them were Catalan businessmen from Barcelona who had moved to Madrid.
