= 1905–06 FC Barcelona season =

7th season in existence of FC Barcelona

FC Barcelona
1905–06 season
- President: Josep Soler
- Campionat de Catalunya: Third
Home colours	Away colours

The 1905–06 season was the seventh season for FC Barcelona.

== Events ==
The season could not have started worse, losing 10–1 to Athletic Bilbao and losing the Catalan Championship which was eventually won by X Sporting Club, their biggest rival at the time, as the original RCD Espanyol had to suspend its activities at the start of the 1905–06 season.

After very bad results the club entered a deep crisis, and up to 35 members resigned. The growing decline in popular support made the club take the risky decision of inviting Madrid FC to play a friendly match, despite the unpredictable reactions that a defeat could cause. But thanks to reinforcements from other teams in the city, such as Сharles Wallace of FC Internacional, and Ponz of X Sporting Club, they played a great game and won 5–2. When the Barça players and managers left the banquet they offered them, the Madridistas took it as an insult and criticized them with provocative words. This incident helped shape the rivalry between the two clubs.

On 6 October 1905, Josep Soler became president.

== Squad ==
Note: Flags indicate national team as defined under FIFA eligibility rules; some limited exceptions apply. Players may hold more than one non-FIFA nationality.

No.	Pos.	Nation	Player
—	GK	ESP	Joan Soler
—	GK	ESP	Romà Solà
—	DF	ESP	Durán
—	DF	ESP	Manuel Soler
—	MF	ESP	Josep Quirante
—	MF	ESP	Francisco Sanz
—	MF	ESP	Juli Marial
—	MF	ESP	Josep Ortiz
—	MF	ESP	Josep Vidal
—	MF	ESP	Jaime Vilà
—	MF	ESP	John Hamilton
—	FW	ESP	Alfonso Almasqué

No.	Pos.	Nation	Player
—	FW	ESP	Romà Forns
—	FW	ESP	Esteve Flaquer
—	FW	ESP	Carlos Comamala
—	FW	POR	D'Acosta
—	FW	ESP	Joan Bargunyó
—	FW	ENG	Stanley Harris
—	FW	GER	Udo Steinberg
—	FW	ESP	Alfredo Gil
—	FW	ESP	George Noble
—	FW	ESP	Enrique Barraquer
—	FW	ESP	Matias Colmenares

== Results ==
=== Friendlies ===
17 December 1905	FC Barcelona	2 – 0	FC Internacional	Barcelona
	Quirante			Stadium: Associacio; Referee: Darner

15 April 1906	Athletic Club	10 – 1	FC Barcelona	Bilbao
			Sampere	Stadium: Hippodrome of Lamiako; Referee: Arana

17 April 1906	Recreacion Club	3 – 1	FC Barcelona	San Sebastián
			Harris	Stadium: Recreacion; Referee: Mendez

22 April 1906	FC Barcelona	5 – 3	Català FC	Barcelona
	Forns; Comamala; Vilà			Stadium: Camp del Carrer Muntaner; Referee: Samuel Morris

6 May 1906	FC Barcelona	1 – 0	X Sporting Club	Barcelona
	Gil			Stadium: Camp del Carrer Muntaner; Referee: Enrique Barraquer

13 May 1906	FC Barcelona	5 – 2	Madrid FC	Barcelona
	Сharles Wallace; Ponz; Forns		Meléndez; Revuelto	Stadium: Camp del Carrer Muntaner; Attendance: 3000; Referee: Rafael Degollada

20 May 1906	FC Barcelona	1 – 4	FC Internacional	Barcelona
	Gil		?	Stadium: Camp del Carrer Muntaner; Referee: Gustavo Green

10 June 1906	FC Barcelona	1 – 2	X Sporting Club	Barcelona
	Comamala			Stadium: Camp del Carrer Muntaner; Referee: Rodriguez

24 June 1906	FC Barcelona	0 – 0	X Sporting Club	Barcelona
				Stadium: Sabadell; Referee: Rafael Degollada

21 July 1906	FC Barcelona	4 – 0	X Sporting Club	Barcelona
	Marial; Barraquer; Sanz			Stadium: Salut; Referee: Marti

=== Salut Cup ===
17 June 1906	FC Barcelona	2 – 4	X Sporting Club	Barcelona
	Barraquer; Comamala			Stadium: Salut; Referee: Darner

1 July 1906	FC Barcelona	3 – 3	FC Internacional	Barcelona
	Quirante; Amechazurra			Stadium: Salut; Referee: Balat

=== Catalan championship ===
Pos	Team	Pld	W	D	L	GF	GA	GD	Pts	Qualification
1	X Sporting Club (C)	6	5	0	1	7	4	+3	10	Champion
2	FC Internacional	6	4	0	2	11	9	+2	8	
3	FC Barcelona	6	3	0	3	16	10	+6	6	
4	Català FC	6	0	0	6	2	13	−11	0	
5	Joventut FC	0	0	0	0	0	0	0	0	Withdraw
6	Club Espanyol	0	0	0	0	0	0	0	0	Withdraw

Updated to match(es) played on complet. Source:
(C) Champions

=== Results ===
7 January 1906 1	Català FC	0 – 3	FC Barcelona	Barcelona
15:40			Forns; Quirante; Bargunyó	Stadium: Camp de l'Hospital Clínic; Referee: Rafael Degollada

14 January 1906 2	FC Internacional	4 – 2	FC Barcelona	Barcelona
	Goal		Steinberg; Bargunyó	Stadium: Camp de l'Hospital Clínic; Referee: Jaime Vila

28 January 1906 4	FC Barcelona	1 – 2	X Sporting Club	Barcelona
	Steinberg		Goal	Stadium: Camp del Carrer Muntaner; Referee: Joaquim Carril

4 February 1906 5	FC Barcelona	5 – 0	Joventut FC	Barcelona
	Bargunyó; D'Acosta; Quirante			Stadium: Camp de l'Hospital Clínic; Referee: Grau
Note: Since Joventut will eventually withdraw, this match was not reflected in the classification.

4 March 1906 6	X Sporting Club	2 – 0	FC Barcelona	Barcelona
	Galiardo			Stadium: Camp del Carrer Muntaner; Referee: Gros

25 March 1906 9	FC Barcelona	5 – 2²	Català FC	Barcelona
	Comamala; D'Acosta; Harris		Goal	Stadium: Camp del Carrer Muntaner; Referee: Josep Ortiz
Note: This match had been originally scheduled for 11 February, but it was postponed due to rain after it had already started.

1 April 1906 10	FC Barcelona	5 – 0	FC Internacional	Barcelona
16:00	Forns; Sanz; Quirante			Stadium: Camp del Carrer Muntaner; Referee: Shimping
