= Udo Steinberg =

German engineer, athlete and sports official (1877–1919)

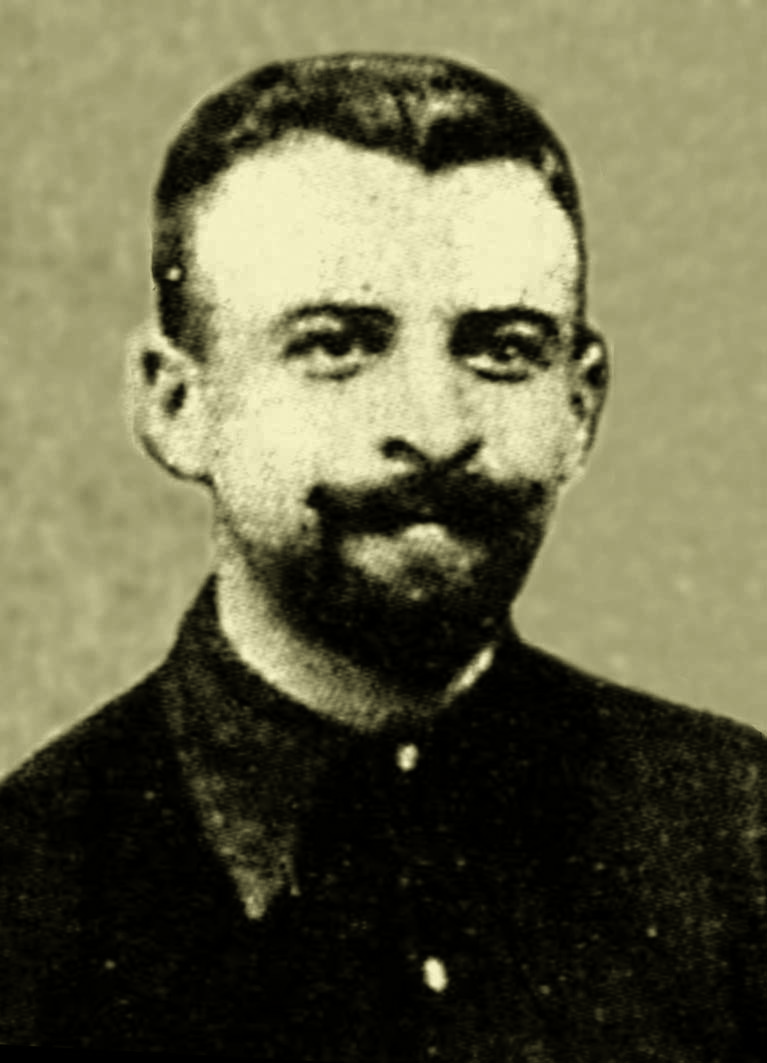
- Steinberg in 1903

Personal information
- Full name: Udo Steinberg Werle
- Date of birth: 13 June 1877
- Place of birth: Berlin, Germany
- Date of death: 25 December 1919 (aged 42)
- Place of death: Madrid, Spain
- Position: Forward

Senior career*
Years	Team	Apps	(Gls)
1896–1899	Mittweidaer BC		
1896–1899	FC Germania		
1899–1900	Chemnitz SC Britannia		
1901–1902	FC Barcelona II	+3	
1902–1910	FC Barcelona	75	(57)
- * Club domestic league appearances and goals

Udo Steinberg Werle (13 June 1877 – 25 December 1919) was a German engineer, athlete and sports official who played football as a forward for the Spanish club FC Barcelona between 1902 and 1910. He is best known for being the author of Barça's first-ever goal in the history of the El Clásico.

Before settling in Spain, he participated in the founding of several football clubs in his country, as well as being present at the meeting in which the German Football Association was born. He founded the forerunner of La Masia in 1902, managing it until 1916, and he also co-founded the forerunner of Real Club de Tenis Barcelona. He also worked as a sports editor, and he even held the presidency of the Catalan Football Federation in 1906. He played with Barça for eight years (1902–1910), netting 57 goals in 75 appearances, thus contributing decisively to the conquest of Barça's first official titles, 1901–02 Copa Macaya, which was the club's first-ever piece of silverware, 1902–03 Copa Barcelona and the 1904–05 Catalan championship. During his time in Catalonia, Steinberg was undoubtedly one of the most influential players of FC Barcelona on and off the pitch.

Despite being an outstanding football player, a sport to which he owes his career, he was an all-around sportsman who also performed in other modalities such as athletics, cricket, tennis, cycling, boxing and alpine disciplines.

== Education ==
Udo Steinberg was born as the second son of a total of six children from Eugen Oscar Steinberg and his wife Pauline Elise Cäcilie, on 13 June 1877 in Berlin. By the time his father died in Italy in 1889, Steinberg was attending the Friedrich Wilhelm Gymnasium, where he completed an apprenticeship in Ferdinand Ernecke's mechanical workshop in Berlin. He moved to Chemnitz in 1896, to study electrical engineering and mechanical engineering at the Mittweida technical school, graduating in both disciplines in 1900. From October 1897 to April 1899 he interrupted his studies to do practical work in Berlin.

At the turn of the century, in 1900–01, he decided to take advantage of a job opportunity in Barcelona, and ended up settling there.

== Sports career ==
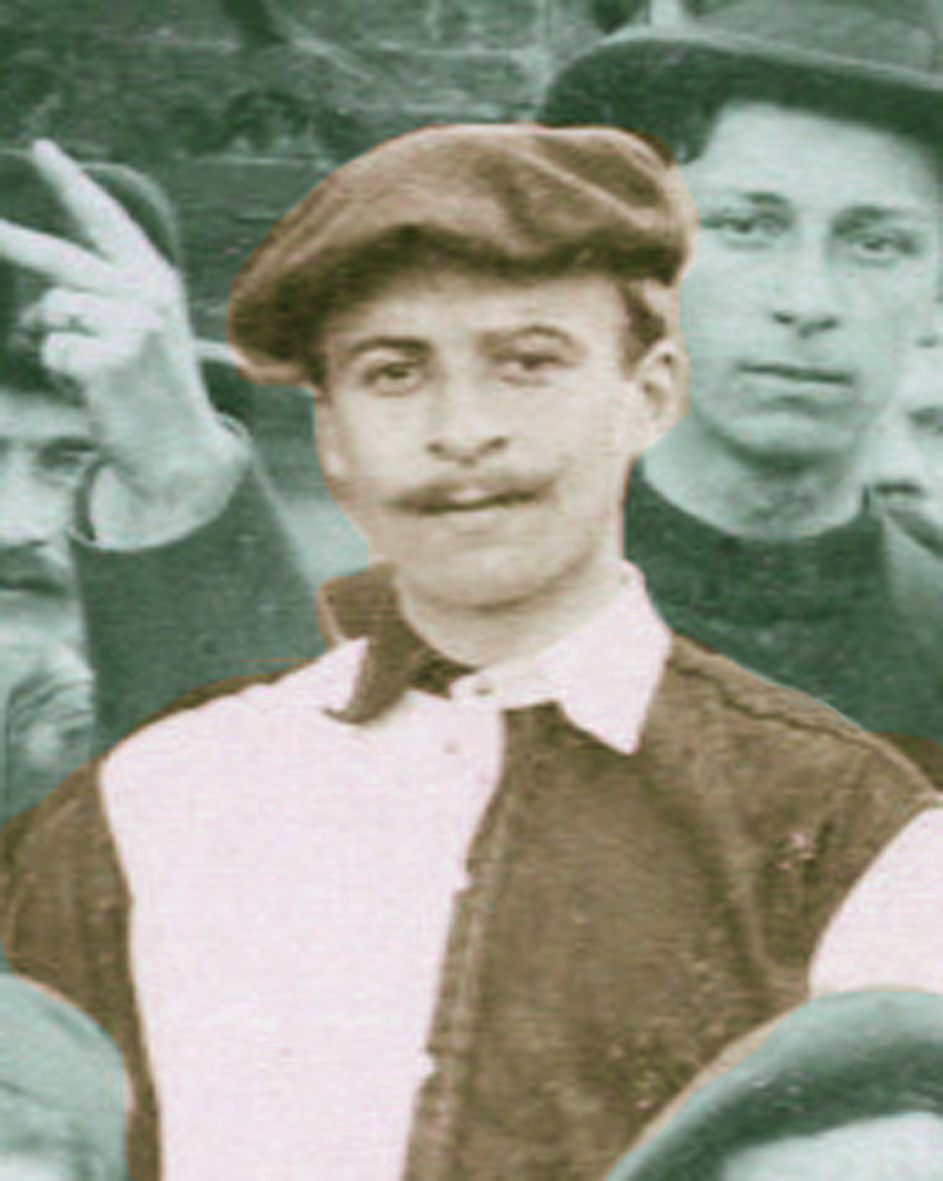
Udo Steinberg as a player of Mittweidaer BC in 1899

In 1893, at the age of only 16, he was a founding member of the Brandenburg football club in Berlin. In 1896, he was one of the 12 students who founded the Mittweidaer BC, the Mittweida school's football team, and in 1899 he founded, together with other students, the Chemnitz SC Britannia, from which Chemnitzer FC later emerged. On 28 January 1900, Steinberg was sent to Leipzig to attend the founding meeting of the German Football Association (DFB) as a delegate of both Mittweida and Britannia. It was around this time that Steinberg met the Portuguese Virgilio Da Costa, an industrial technical engineer who also played for the Mittweida BC, and with whom he established a great friendship, and they went on to be teammates at FC Barcelona. In addition to da Costa, Mittweida BC was also the football cradle of the likes of Antonio Alonso from Vigo, Juan Arzuaga, Adolfo Uribe and Luis Astorquia from Bilbao.

After moving to Barcelona in 1900, he began playing tennis and football with athletes from Germany, England and Switzerland who lived in the Catalan capital, and together, they founded the Barcelona sports club. In April 1902, the first football school of FC Barcelona was created and Steinberg was appointed director of it in order to "instill his extensive knowledge in the players of the third side". This school was the forerunner of La Masia, and he managed it until 1916, which means that, in a way, he was the first-ever youth coach of FC Barcelona. From 5 December 1902 to 6 November 1907, he was a member of Barça's board. He was also a prominent driver of the Spanish Football Federation and the Referees Commission. On multiple occasions, Steinberg would take the role of the referee.

In 1906, together with Joan Gamper, the Parsons brothers (John and William), the Witty brothers (Arthur, Ernest) and Arthur Leask, among others, Steinberg was one of the founders of the Lawn Tennis Club Barcelona (later Real Club de Tenis Barcelona). In the same year, between 8 February and 9 December, he held the presidency of the Federation of Football Clubs of Barcelona, which later became the Catalan Football Federation. Also in 1906, he wrote as an editor for the sports newspaper El Mundo Deportivo, being one of the members of its first-ever edition launched on 1 February 1906.

In addition to his passion for football, he was also enthusiastic about athletics, cricket, tennis, and field hockey. An accomplished sportsman, he also excelled as an athlete in the 100m and 400m, seeing success in those categories in sprinting tournaments held in Barcelona at the time.

== Footballing career ==
Steinberg began to play football actively in 1888, still in Berlin. In 1893, he played with Brandenburg football club, which he had co-founded, and he also played with Berliner SV 1892. During his time in Mittweida, Steinberg played with FC Germania, today Germania Mittweida, and with the Mittweidaer BC and Britannia SC, which he had also co-founded. He played the majority of his footballing career as a midfielder, although during the early years of his career he was a very prolific center forward, very quick on the run and a great specialist in free-kicks.

His entry into FC Barcelona was not easy due to his looks, since he was somewhat overweight and had a suspicious goatee. Despite assuring them that he had played with Britannia FC in Berlin, Steinberg was put in Barça's second team, where he impressed the team captain, Luis de Ossó, one of the club's founders, thus earning a chance to show his class. He made his debut for the first team on 6 January 1902 in a match against Hispania AC in the 1901–02 Copa Macaya, making a "marvelous" performance in a 2–4 win. Steinberg quickly established his position in Barcelona and was one of the most prominent players in the team.

Steinberg played a fundamental role in Barça's first-ever piece of silverware, the 1901–02 Copa Macaya, netting a whopping 17 goals, including back-to-back hat-tricks against Club Español and University SC and a 6-goal haul in the tournament's final matchday on 23 March 1902 to help his side to a 15–0 victory over Català FC. Despite his prolificity in front of goal, he failed to be the tournament's top scorer as he was narrowly outscored by teammate and captain Joan Gamper. The Copa Macaya is now recognized as the first Catalan championship.

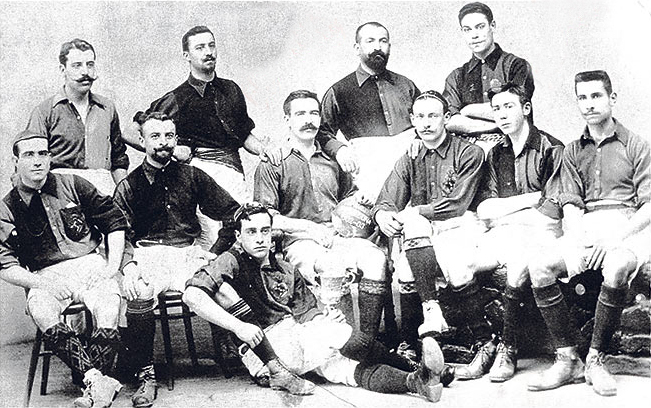
FC Barcelona in 1903. Standing: Llobet, Terradas, Reig and Vidal. Seated: Ossó, Steinberg, Meyer, Witty, Gamper, Harris and Lassaletta.

Together with Gamper, the Morris brothers (Samuel, Enrique, Miguel) and Alfonso Albéniz, he was a member of the Barcelona side that participated in the very first national tournament played in Spain, the 1902 Copa de la Coronación, helping Barça reach the final on 15 May 1902, where they were beaten 2–1 by Bizcaya (a combination of players from Athletic Club and Bilbao Football Club). In the semi-finals on 13 May, Steinberg went down in history as one of the eleven footballers who played in the very first El Clásico in history, netting twice in a 3–1 comeback victory for Barça against Madrid FC (later Real), thus becoming Barça's first-ever goalscorer in the history of this eternal clash.

Steinberg was a talented footballer and, at the same time, a super athlete. He was the first coach of Barcelona, one of the first sports journalists, and an outstanding engineer.

— Ludwig Hilmer

He was an undisputed starter for the club between 1902 and 1909. In 1903, he added a new title to his career, the Copa Barcelona, which was later recognized as the fourth edition of the Catalan Championship. Together with the likes of José Quirante, Romà Forns, and Carles Comamala, he helped Barça win the 1904–05 Catalan championship. He stayed loyal to the club through its crisis in the mid-1900s and helped them win another championship in 1908–09, this time featuring alongside the likes of Paco Bru, Enrique Peris and Charles Wallace.

Together with Manuel Amechazurra, Ricard Graells, Pepe Rodríguez, he participated in the inaugural edition of the Pyrenees Cup, playing in the semi-finals against Olympique de Cette on 24 April in a 1–1 draw, and though he did not play in the final which they won with a 2–1 win over Real Sociedad, this was his last title in his career. In 1910 he ended his career to prioritize himself on his company Udo Steinberg S. en. C..

== Professional career ==
Shortly after graduating, in 1901, he decided to take advantage of a job opportunity in Barcelona, a one-year voluntary service in the city, but ended up settling there. In 1902, he became the representative of German electrical and mechanical engineering companies in Spain and Portugal, and in 1904 he founded an engineering office in Barcelona, which he ran together with the engineer Badia until 1906. The two engineers offered the complete installation of factories, gas and electricity plants, as well as studies and budgets. He earned special credit for the use of ball bearings in vehicle wheels, for which he applied for a patent. Likewise, he was even the owner of several patents in engineering in Barcelona, owning other patents such as for presses and mills as well as for electrolysis and electrical connections.

After his retirement, he focused on his career as an engineer. In 1910, he collaborated in the layout and development of the Barcelona tramway, commissioning to lay a tram line in the outskirts of Barcelona. In 1911, the line from Barcelona to Rabassada, which was built with his participation, was inaugurated with a length of 7.8 km. In 1916, Steinberg and Paul Schröder founded a limited partnership with 28 employees for the construction and sale of machines of all kinds, which later became La Maquinista Hispania. With his company Udo Steinberg S. en. C. he devoted himself to the construction and sale of machines of all kinds.

== Death ==
Steinberg died on the Christmas Day of 1919, at the age of only 42 years old, due to spanish flu. He was buried in the Civil Cemetery of Madrid.

== Career statistics ==
=== Club ===
Appearances and goals by club, season and competition
Club	Season	League		Cup		Other		Total	
Club	Season	Apps	Goals	Apps	Goals	Apps	Goals	Apps	Goals
Britannia Chemnitz	1899								
FC Barcelona	1901–02					8+	19+	8+	19+
FC Barcelona	1902–03					28	18+	28	18+
FC Barcelona	1903–04	16	4			11	3+	27	7+
FC Barcelona	1904–05	8	2			9	2+	17	4+
FC Barcelona	1905–06	7	2			12	0	19	2
FC Barcelona	1906–07	5	0			14	1	19	1
FC Barcelona	1907–08	0	0			0	0	0	0
FC Barcelona	1908–09	5	0	1	0	18	2+	24	2+
FC Barcelona	1909–10	12	1+	2	0	18	2+	32	2+
Total		48	9+	3	0	118+	48	174+	55+

== Honours ==
Barcelona

- Copa Macaya: 1901–02
- Copa Barcelona: 1902–03
- Catalan championship: 1904–05, 1908–09
- Pyrenees Cup: 1910

== See also ==
- FC Barcelona (youth)
