= Antonio Alonso (footballer) =

Spanish footballer (1885–1973)

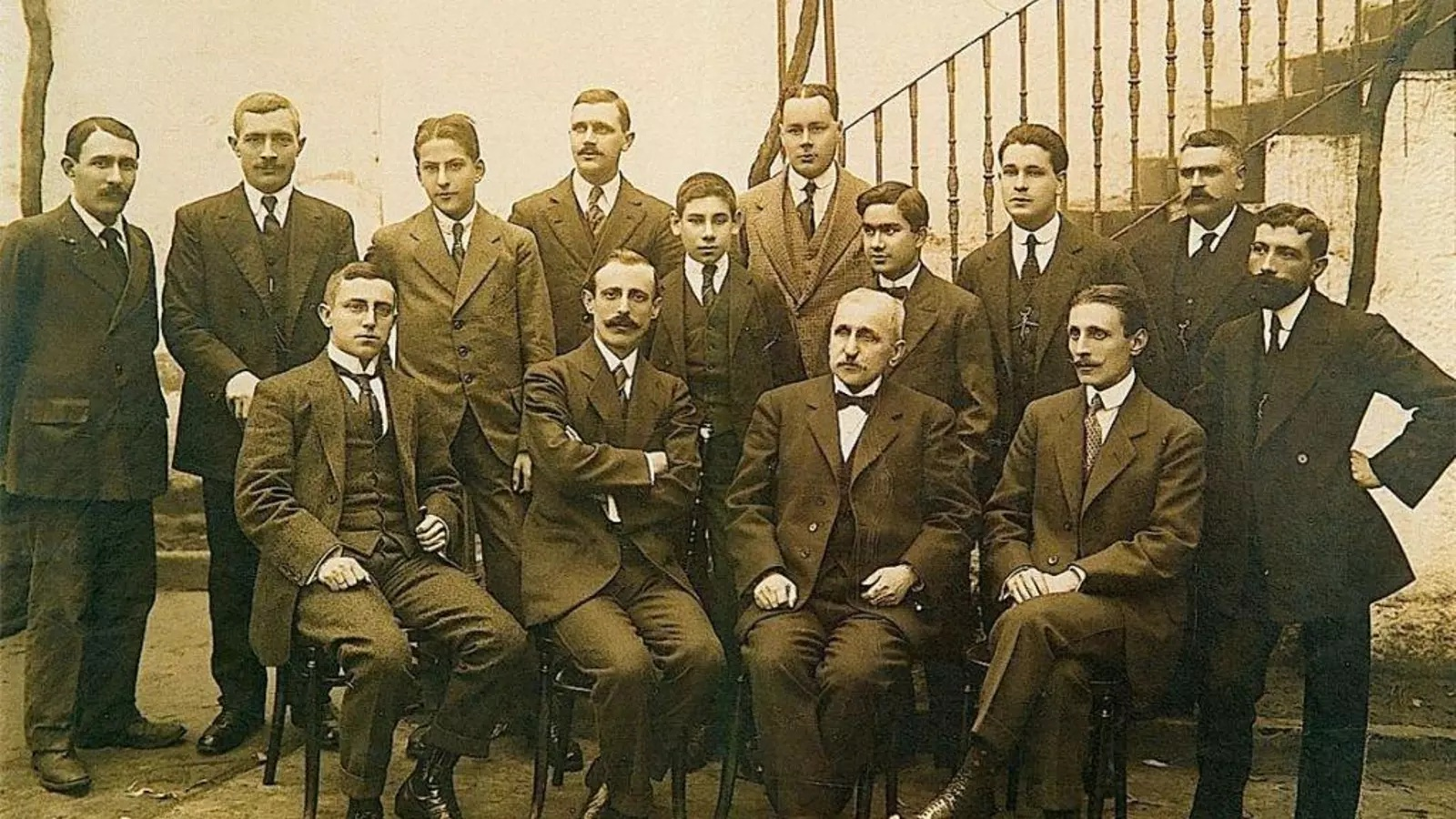

Personal information
- Full name: Antonio Alonso Giménez-Cuenca
- Date of birth: 14 June 1886
- Place of birth: Vigo, Province of Pontevedra, Spain
- Date of death: 1973 (aged 87-88)
- Position: Forward

Senior career*
Years	Team	Apps	(Gls)
1901–1903	Mittweidaer BC		
1904–1906	Madrid FC		
1906–1910	Vigo FC		
1910–1911	Madrid FC		
- * Club domestic league appearances and goals

Antonio Alonso Giménez-Cuenca (14 June 1886 – 1973) was a Spanish footballer who played as a forward for Madrid FC. With them, he won back-to-back Copa del Rey titles in 1905 and 1906. He was president of Vigo FC in 1905 and his brother Rodrigo was president in 1908.

== Early life ==
Antonio Alonso was born in Vigo on 14 June 1885, as the fourth son of Antonio Alonso Santodomingo and his wife Eloísa Giménez-Cuenca (1860–1935). Being the son of a well-off family of industrialists from Vigo, he was sent to Germany to complete his studies of mechanical engineering, doing so at the Hochschule Mittweida University in Saxony. There he developed an interest in football and began playing for the school's football team, Mittweidaer Ballspiel-Club, which had been founded in 1896 by students. In addition to Alonso, Mittweida BC was also the football cradle of the likes of Udo Steinberg from Berlin, Virgilio Da Costa from Porto, Juan Arzuaga, Adolfo Uribe, and Luis Astorquia from Bilbao.

== Playing career ==
Upon arriving in Madrid in late 1903, Alonso joined the ranks of Madrid CF. Despite his obvious past as a footballer in Germany, several Real Madrid History books have described his first steps in Madrid in a curious way, stating "that he was wandering around the field and to pay attention to the way he returns the balls". In his first season at the club in 1903–04, Alonso only played two matches, making his debut on 19 March 1904, in a match against Español de Madrid that was meant to decide the city's representative for the 1904 Copa del Rey final against Athletic Bilbao, netting once in an eventual 5–5 draw.

Alonso then played a pivotal role in helping the club win two back-to-back Copa del Rey titles in 1905 and 1906, scoring twice in the semifinals of the 1905 edition against San Sebastián Recreation Club, and then starting in both finals. His older brother Rodrigo also signed for Madrid, but it was Antonio who acquired great prominence in the team with his performances. During his three years with Madrid, he played a total of six cup matches, scoring twice.

In 1905, Alonso was president of Vigo FC, while his brother Rodrigo was president in 1908. In 1906, Alonso left Madrid to join Vigo FC, with whom he played until 1910. He then returned to Madrid for one final season in 1910–11.

== Refereeing career ==
Alonso participated in the 1906 Copa del Rey as both a player and a referee, winning the cup as the former and overseeing one match as the latter, between Athletic Bilbao and Recreativo de Huelva on 11 April, which ended in a 2–1 victory to Bilbao.

== Personal life ==
Upon his father's death in 1917, his business saga was continued by Antonio, Salvador, Rodrigo, and Mauro, who in 1918 created the Antonio Alonso-Hijos company.

Alonso married Elisa Meléndez, and the couple had at least two sons, Antonio and Guillermo Alonso Meléndez, who undertook their own initiatives. The first, in 1947, established a new canning factory in Portosín, on the site of the old Roura salting warehouse, which he ended up selling in 1960 to Daniel Vázquez. The second, acquired in 1947, the canning factory that Amador Mouriño had in the Cambados dock, which he would sell to Conservas Galbán in 1956.

== Death ==
Alonso died in 1973, at the age of either 87 or 88.

== Honours ==
Madrid FC

- Campeonato Regional Centro: 1904–05, and 1905–06
- Copa del Rey: 1905, 1906
