= Peris (surname) =

Peris is a Spanish surname. Notable people with the surname include:

- Agustin Peris (1880–1948), Spanish sports journalist and pioneer of baseball and football in Catalonia
- Antonio Peris Carbonell (born 1957), Spanish painter and sculptor
- Brooke Peris (born 1993), Australian field hockey player
- Ceridwen Peris, the pseudonym of Alice Gray Jones (1852–1943), Welsh writer and editor
- Enrique Peris (1887–1953), Spanish footballer
- Esther Peris (born 2000), Spanish paraplegic
- Gema Peris (born 1983), Spanish female weightlifter
- Giancarlo Peris (born 1941), Italian track athlete
- Gutyn Peris, the Bardic name of Griffith Williams (1769–1838), Welsh language poet
- Jack Peris (born 2003), Australian rules footballer
- Jovaldir Ferreira (known as Peris; born 1982), Brazilian footballer
- Julio Peris Brell (1866–1944), Valencian painter
- Lisandro Peris (1891–1951), Spanish footballer
- Malinee Peris (born 1929), Sri Lankan classical pianist
- Mercedes Peris (born 1985), Spanish Olympic swimmer
- Nova Peris (born 1971), Australian hockey player, runner, and politician
- Rosa Peris Cervera (born 1969), Spanish politician
- Saint Peris, Welsh saint
- Sergio Peris-Mencheta (born 1975), Spanish actor and theatre director
- Vicent Peris (1478–1522), Spanish rebel
- Vicente Moreno Peris (born 1974), Spanish former professional footballer

== See also ==
- Peris (disambiguation)
- Peris Pardede (1918–1982), Indonesian politician
- Peris Chepchumba (born 1968), Kenyan politician
- Peris Tobiko (born 1969), Kenyan politician
