= Marial (surname) =

Marial is a Spanish and South Sudanese surname. Notable people with the surname include:

- Augustino Marial, South Sudanese Olympic boxer
- Chol Marial (born 1999), South Sudanese college basketball player
- Guor Marial (born 1984), South Sudanese Olympic track and field athlete
- Juli Marial (1885-1963), Spanish president and player of FC Barcelona
- Juli Marial Tey (1853–1929), Spanish architect and politician
- Melcior Marial (1887–?), Spanish engineer and politician
- Barnaba Marial Benjamin (born 1957), South Sudanese politician
