= 1906–07 FC Barcelona season =

8th season in existence of FC Barcelona

FC Barcelona
1906–07 season
- President: Juli Marial
- Campionat de Catalunya: Second
Home colours	Away colours

The 1906–07 season was the eighth season for FC Barcelona.

== Squad ==
Note: Flags indicate national team as defined under FIFA eligibility rules; some limited exceptions apply. Players may hold more than one non-FIFA nationality.

No.	Pos.	Nation	Player
—	GK	(Spain) ESP	Joan Solà
—	GK	(Spain) ESP	Joan Soler
—	DF	(Spain) ESP	Francisco Bru
—	DF	(Spain) ESP	Durán
—	DF	(Spain) ESP	Manuel Soler
—	MF	(Spain) ESP	Juli Marial
—	MF	(Spain) ESP	Enrique Peris
—	MF	(Germany) GER	Udo Steinberg

No.	Pos.	Nation	Player
—	MF	(Spain) ESP	Josep Quirante
—	FW	(Philippines) PHI	Manuel Amechazurra
—	FW	(Spain) ESP	Carlos Comamala
—	FW	(Spain) ESP	Romà Forns
—	FW	(Spain) ESP	Francisco Sanz
—	FW	(Spain) ESP	Alfredo Gil
—	FW	(Spain) ESP	Lluís Moret
—	FW	(Spain) ESP	Matias Colmenares

== Results ==
Friendly

16 December 1906	FC Barcelona	0 – 3	FC X	Barcelona
				Stadium: Muntaner; Referee: Steinberg

23 December 1906	Stade Olympique Cettois	2 – 4	FC Barcelona	Franca
			Forns; Quirante; C.Comamala	Stadium: Cette; Referee: Brunnel {Franca}

25 December 1906	Stade Olympien Toulouse	4 – 4	FC Barcelona	Franca
			C.Comamala; Amechazurra; Forns	Stadium: Toulouse; Referee: Degrez {Franca}

1 January 1907	FC Barcelona	5 – 1	Stade Olympien Toulouse	Barcelona
	C.Comamala; Amechazurra; Quirante			Stadium: Muntaner; Referee: Labat {Franca}

14 April 1907	FC Barcelona	2 – 3	FC X	Barcelona
	C.Comamala			Stadium: Muntaner; Referee: Ruiz

9 May 1907	FC Barcelona	7 – 0	FC Espanya	Barcelona
	C.Comamala; Quirante			Stadium: Muntaner; Referee: Ruiz

13 May 1907	FC Barcelona	9 – 1	FC Espanya	Barcelona
	Sanz; Forns; C.Comamala; Steinberg; Berger			Stadium: Muntaner; Referee: Marial

Copa Sabadell

2 June 1907	FC Barcelona	4 – 0	Català FC	Barcelona
	Quirante; Berger			Stadium: Sabadell; Referee: Sans

9 June 1907	FC Barcelona	4 – 2	FC X	Barcelona
	Berger; Quirante; Bru			Stadium: Sabadell; Referee: Garriga

Copa Salut

12 August 1906	FC Barcelona	2 – 0	Català FC	Barcelona
	C.Comamala			Stadium: Salut; Referee: Sanmartin

28 August 1906	FC Barcelona	4 – 2	FC X	Barcelona
	Amechazurra; C.Comamala; Albéniz			Stadium: Salut; Referee: Castanos

16 September 1906	Salut SC	not played	FC Barcelona	Barcelona
				Stadium: Salut

30 September 1906	FC Barcelona	1 – 1^{1}	Català FC	Barcelona
	Amechazurra			Stadium: Salut; Referee: Balaguer

14 October 1906 Final	FC Barcelona	3 – 1^{2}	FC X	Barcelona
	C.Comamala; Lizárraga			Stadium: Salut; Referee: Balaguer

Campionat de Catalunya

20 January 1907 Jornada 1	Català FC	1 – 1	FC Barcelona	Barcelona
	Goal		Sanz	Stadium: Velòdrom de la Bonanova; Referee: Yrizar

3 February 1907 Jornada 3	FC X	0 – 1	FC Barcelona	Barcelona
			Comamala	Referee: Gispert

17 February 1907 Jornada 4	FC Barcelona	3 – 0	Català FC	Barcelona
	Moret; Comamala			Stadium: Camp del carrer Muntaner; Referee: Sanmartín

3 March 1907 Jornada 6	FC Barcelona	3 – 3	FC X	Barcelona
	Amechazurra 10'; Moret; Bru		Sampere; Berdié	Stadium: Camp del carrer Muntaner; Referee: Grau

17 March 1907 Final	FC X	3 – 1	FC Barcelona	Sabadell
	Eranueva; Sampere; C. Torras		Amechazurra	Stadium: Camp de la Creu Alta; Referee: Sanmartín
