= 1903–04 FC Barcelona season =

5th season in existence of FC Barcelona

FC Barcelona
1903–04 season
- President: Arthur Witty
- Campionat de Catalunya: Fourth
Home colours	Away colours

The 1903–04 season was the fifth season for FC Barcelona.

== Events ==
- September 17, 1903: Arthur Witty relieved Pau Haas of the presidency of the club.

== Squad ==
Note: Flags indicate national team as defined under FIFA eligibility rules; some limited exceptions apply. Players may hold more than one non-FIFA nationality.

No.	Pos.	Nation	Player
—	GK	ESP	Juli Marial
—	GK	ESP	Joan Soler
—	GK	ENG	Fischer
—	GK	ESP	Flaquer
—	GK	ESP	John Parsons
—	DF	ESP	Arthur Witty
—	DF	ESP	Josep Quirante
—	DF	ENG	Miguel Morris
—	DF	ESP	Joan Fontanet
—	DF	ESP	Duran
—	DF	ESP	Francisco Guardiola
—	DF	ESP	Lluís Garriga
—	DF	ENG	A. Smart
—	MF	ESP	Josep Vidal
—	MF	ESP	Francisco Sanz
—	MF	SUI	George Meyer
—	MF	ESP	Arsenio Comamala

No.	Pos.	Nation	Player
—	MF	ESP	Mas
—	MF	ESP	Josep Ortiz
—	MF	ESP	Josep Llobet
—	FW	ESP	Carlos Comamala
—	FW	ESP	Romà Forns
—	FW	ESP	Bernat Lassaleta
—	FW	ENG	Stanley Harris
—	FW	ESP	Virgilio Da Costa
—	FW	ESP	George Noble
—	FW	SUI	Shooter
—	FW	GER	Udo Steinberg
—	FW	ENG	John MacKenzie
—	FW	ENG	Ellers
—	FW	SUI	Hans Gamper
—	FW	ESP	José Jorró
—	FW	ESP	Luis de Ossó

== Results ==
Friendly

4 October 1903	FC Barcelona	6–1	FC Internacional	Barcelona
	Jorro; Lassaleta; Quirante			Stadium: Horta; Referee: Mahia

11 October 1903	FC Barcelona	5–1	Català FC	Barcelona
	Jorro; Almasque; Sanz; Marin			Stadium: Horta; Referee: Femenia

18 October 1903	FC Barcelona	3–2	Irish FC	Barcelona
	Lassaleta; Ossó			Stadium: Horta; Referee: Batlle

1 November 1903	FC Barcelona	7–0	X Sporting Club	Barcelona
	Steinberg; Ossó; Jorro; Vidal			Stadium: Horta; Referee: Park

8 November 1903	FC Barcelona	2–0	Salud SC	Barcelona
	Lassaleta			Stadium: Horta; Referee: Hans Gamper

8 December 1903	Espanyol	3–1	FC Barcelona	Barcelona
			C. Comamala	Stadium: Espanyol; Referee: Eduardo Alesson

27 March 1904	Club Espanyol	1–0	FC Barcelona	Barcelona
				Stadium: Espanyol; Referee: Vinas

3 April 1904	Club Espanyol	2–1	FC Barcelona	Barcelona
			Meyer	Stadium: Espanyol; Referee: Darne

1 May 1904	Stade Olympique Toulouse	2–3 (Note: First game outside of Barcelona Catalonia)	FC Barcelona	Toulouse
			Steinberg; Lassaleta; Forns	Stadium: Toulouse; Referee: Pujol

22 May 1904	FC Vilafranca	'result unknown'	FC Barcelona	Vilafranca
				Stadium: Can Lleó; Referee: Max Gaisser

19 June 1904	Salud SC	0–5	FC Barcelona	Barcelona
			Quirante; Sanz; Sampons	Stadium: Salut; Referee: Garcia

Catalan football championship

22 November 1903 Round 1	FC Barcelona	10–0	Salud SC	Barcelona
	C. Comamala; Steinberg; Forns; Lassaleta			Stadium: Camp de la carretera d'Horta; Referee: Boix

29 November 1903 Round 2	Joventut FC	0–3	FC Barcelona	Barcelona
			Harris; C. Comamala; Lassaleta	Referee: Duran

6 December 1903 Round 3	FC Barcelona	Not played	Ibérico FC	Barcelona
				Stadium: Camp de la carretera d'Horta

11 December 1903 Round 4	FC Internacional	1–1	FC Barcelona	Barcelona
	Goal		Steinberg	Referee: Parck

20 December 1903 Round 5	X Sporting Club	Not played	FC Barcelona	Barcelona

27 December 1903 Round 6	Català FC	1–1	FC Barcelona	Barcelona
	Goal		Lassaleta	Stadium: Velòdrom de la Bonanova; Referee: Eduardo Alesson

3 January 1904 Round 7	FC Barcelona	10–0	FC Sant Gervasi	Barcelona
	Forns; C. Comamala; Quirante			Stadium: Camp de la carretera d'Horta; Referee: Luis de Ossó

31 January 1904 Round 11	Salud SC	2–3	FC Barcelona	Barcelona
	Goal		Harris; Lassaleta 85'	Referee: Gener

7 February 1904 Round 12	FC Barcelona	2–0	Joventut FC	Barcelona
	C. Comamala; D'Costa			Stadium: Camp de la carretera d'Horta; Referee: Ruiz

14 February 1904 Round 13	Ibérico FC	1–4	FC Barcelona	Barcelona
	Goal		C. Comamala; Lassaleta; Forns	Referee: Balaguer

17 February 1904 Round 10	Club Español	4–1	FC Barcelona	Barcelona
	Green; Sampere		Meyer	Stadium: Camp de l'Hospital Clínic (sud); Referee: Parck

21 February 1904 Round 14	FC Barcelona	1–2	FC Internacional	Barcelona
	Witty		Goal	Stadium: Camp de la carretera d'Horta; Referee: Peix

28 February 1904 Round 15	FC Barcelona	4–0	X Sporting Club	Barcelona
	Forns; C. Comamala; Shooter			Stadium: Camp de la carretera d'Horta; Referee: Trujillo

6 March 1904 Round 16	FC Barcelona	Not played	FC Català	Barcelona
				Stadium: Camp de la carretera d'Horta

13 March 1904 Round 17	FC Sant Gervasi	0–13	FC Barcelona	Barcelona
			Forns; Quirante; C. Comamala	Referee: Paniagua

24 April 1904 Round 20	FC Barcelona	4–4	Club Espanyol	Barcelona
	Forns; Lassaleta; Witty		Ponz; Cenarro	Stadium: Camp de l'Hospital Clínic (sud); Referee: Darné
