= 1911 Copa del Rey final =

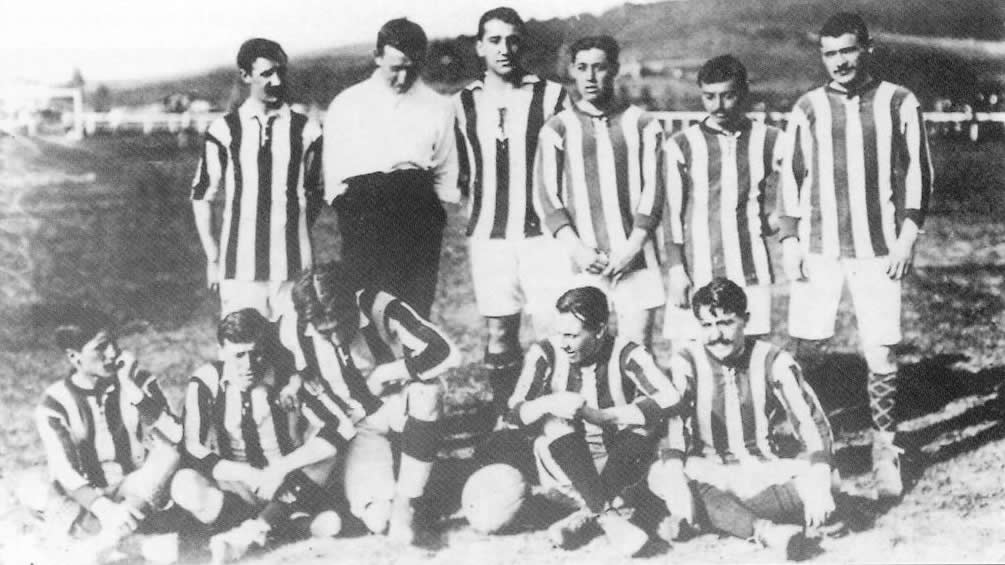
- Athletic Bilbao, champions
- Event: 1911 Copa del Rey
Athletic Bilbao	CD Español
3	1
- Date: 15 April 1911
- Venue: Jolaseta Stadium, Getxo
- Referee: (England) Scott Martyr

The 1911 Copa del Rey final was the 10th final of the Spanish cup competition, the Copa del Rey. The final was played at Jolaseta Stadium in Getxo on 15 April 1911. The match was won by Athletic Bilbao, who beat CD Español 3–1. The Athletic goals were scored by Martyn Veitch, Luis Belaunde, and Manuel Guernica, with Antonio Neyra reducing the deficit for Español with 20 minutes remaining.

== Details ==
15 April 1911

Athletic Bilbao	3–1	CD Español
Veitch 10'; Belaunde 20'; Guernica 50'	Report1; Report2	Neyra 70'

Jolaseta Stadium, Getxo
Referee: (England) Scott Martyr

Athletic Bilbao	CD Español

GK	1	(Spain) Luis Astorquia
DF	2	(Spain) Juan Arzuaga
DF	3	(Spain) Roque Allende
MF	4	(Spain) Remigio Iza
MF	5	(Spain) José María Belauste (c)
MF	6	(Spain) Perico Mandiola
FW	7	(Spain) Luis Belaunde
FW	8	(Spain) Severino Zuazo
FW	9	(Spain) Manuel Guernica
FW	10	(England) Andrew Veitch
FW	11	(Spain) Alejandro Smith Ybarra

GK	1	(Spain) Pedro Gibert
DF	2	(Spain) Santiago Massana
DF	3	(Spain) José Álvarez
MF	4	(Spain) Luis Heredia
MF	5	(Spain) Alfredo Massana (c)
MF	6	(Spain) Plácido Buylla
FW	7	(Spain) Francisco Barenys
FW	8	(Spain) Armando Giralt
FW	9	(Spain) Antonio Neyra
FW	10	(France) Manuel del Castillo
FW	11	(Spain) Emilio Sampere
