= Manuel del Castillo =

Spanish footballer

Personal information
- Full name: Manuel del Castillo de Arechaga
- Birth name: Manuel del Castillo de Arechaga
- Date of birth: 25 November 1884
- Place of birth: Paris, France
- Date of death: 5 April 1969 (aged 84)
- Place of death: Catalonia, Spain
- Position: Midfielder

Senior career*
Years	Team	Apps	(Gls)
1901–1906	FC Internacional		
1906–1909	FC Espanya de Barcelona	308	
1909–1915	RCD Espanyol		

International career
1909	Catalonia	1	(0)
- * Club domestic league appearances and goals

Manuel del Castillo de Arechaga (25 November 1884 – 5 April 1969) was a Spanish footballer who played as a midfielder for RCD Espanyol.

== Playing career ==
=== Club career ===
Manuel del Castillo was born on 25 November 1884 in Paris, and when he was young his family settled in Barcelona, where he began his football career at FC Internacional in 1901. Together with Paco Bru, Charles Wallace, and the Peris brothers (Agustin and Enrique), he helped the club achieve three successive runner-up finishes in the Catalan championship between 1904 and 1906, losing out on the title to a different opponent each time, Club Español (now RCD Espanyol) FC Barcelona and X Sporting Club respectively. In 1906, the club had to suspend its activities due to a lack of players, so most of the remaining FCI players joined FC Barcelona for the 1906–07 season, but del Castillo instead decided to join Barça's city rivals, FC Espanya de Barcelona.

In 1909, del Castillo signed for RCD Espanyol, being a member of the great Espanyol side of the 1910s that had the likes of Bru, Emilio Sampere, and the Wallace brothers (Charles and Percy), winning the Catalan championship in 1911–12, as well as reaching the 1911 Copa del Rey final, in which he started alongside the likes of Sampere, Armando Giralt, and Antonio Neyra, and which they lost 1–3 to Athletic Bilbao.

=== International career ===
In May 1903, the 19-year-old del Castillo, along with many other players, was elected by majority vote as a substitute for a match with the Barcelona City team.

On 18 November 1909, del Castillo earned his only cap for the Catalan national team in a match against Equip Blanc (White Team) at the Camp de la Indústria, on the occasion of a benefit match for the injured people in the Second Melillan campaign, starting in a 2–6 loss.

== Honours ==
RCD Espanyol

- Catalan championship:
  - Champions (1): 1911–12
- Copa del Rey:
  - Runner-up (1): 1911
