= Colmenares =

Colmenares is a surname. Notable people with the surname include:

- Dayana Colmenares (born 1984), Venezuelan beauty pageant titleholder
- Grecia Colmenares (born 1962), Venezuelan-Argentine actress
- José Pérez Colmenares (1914–1944), Venezuelan baseball player
- Luis Andres Colmenares (1990–2010), Colombian student
- Matias Colmenares (1887–1953), Spanish footballer
- Neri Colmenares (born 1959), Filipino human rights lawyer and activist
- Néstor Colmenares (born 1987), Venezuelan basketball player
- Octavio Colmenares (born 1989), Mexican footballer
- Pedro Vázquez Colmenares (1934–2012), Mexican politician
- Ricardo Letts Colmenares (1937–2021), Peruvian politician
- Rodrigo de Colmenares (floruit 1510s), Spanish conquistador
- Samuel Colmenares, Venezuelan Paralympic athlete

== See also ==
- Colmenarez, another surname
