= 1906 Copa del Rey final =

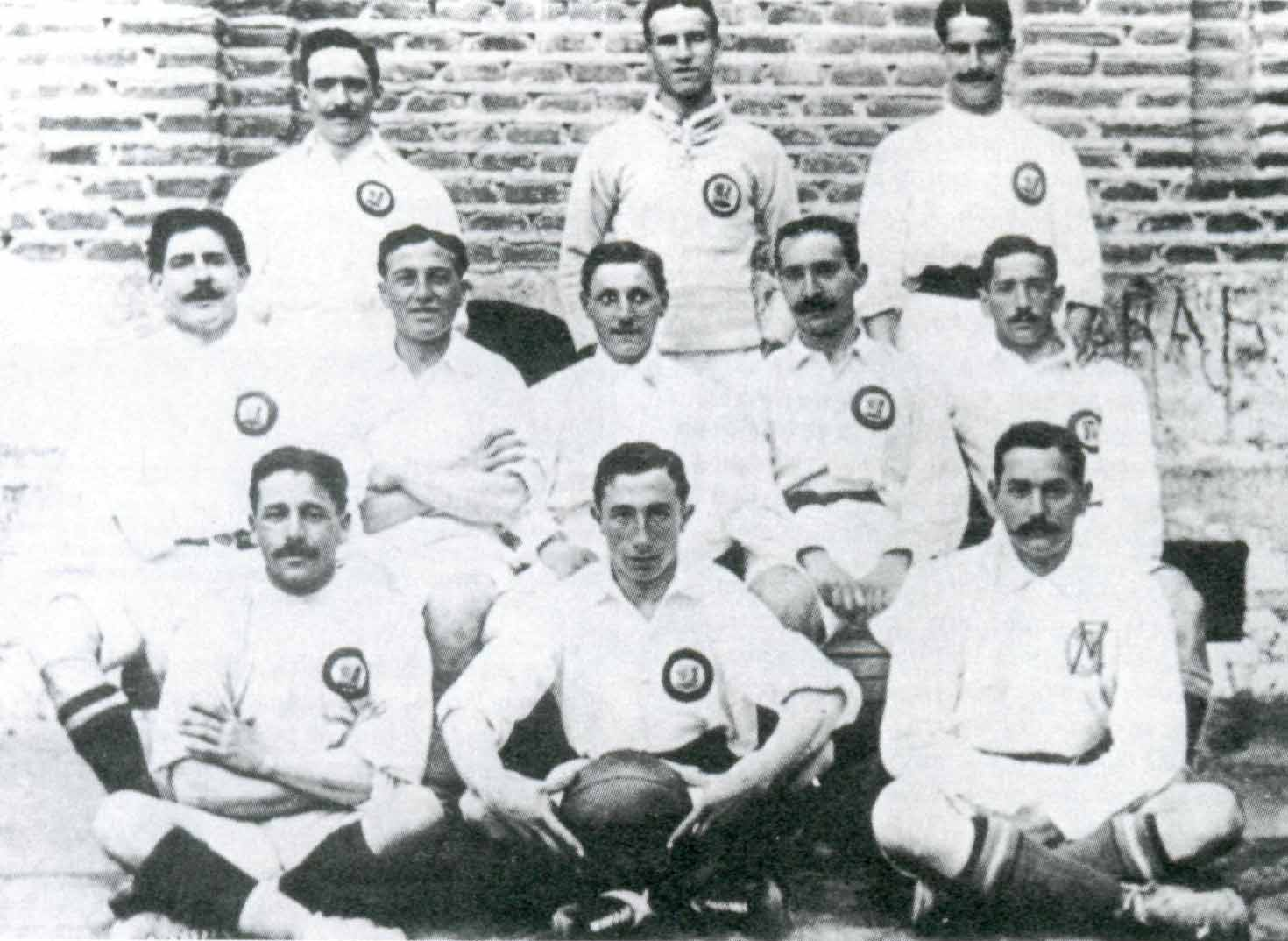
- Madrid FC, champions
- Event: 1906 Copa del Rey
Athletic Bilbao	Madrid FC
1	4
- Date: 10 April 1906
- Venue: Hipódromo, Madrid
- Referee: (England) William Waterson

The 1906 Copa del Rey final was the 4th final of the Copa del Rey, the Spanish football cup competition. The match took place on 10 April 1906 at the Hipódromo, Madrid. The match was contested by Athletic Bilbao and Madrid FC, and saw Madrid FC win 4-1 with braces from Manuel Prast and Pedro Parages, thus lifting the trophy for the second time in their history.

== Match details ==
10 April 1906

Athletic Bilbao	1–4	Madrid FC
Uribe 2T'	Report 1 Report 2	Prast 1T', 2T'; Paragues 2T', 80'

Estadio del Hipódromo, Madrid
Referee: (England) William Waterson

Athletic Bilbao
Madrid FC

GK	(Spain) Javier Prado
DF	(Spain) Ignacio Allende
DF	(Spain) José Irízar
MF	(Spain) Remigio Eguren
MF	(Spain) Tomás Murga
MF	(Spain) Raimundo Moreno
FW	(Spain) Fausto Manzarraga
FW	(Argentina) Hermenegildo García
FW	(Spain) Eustaquio Celada
FW	(Spain) Adolfo Uribe
FW	(Spain) Joaquín Elósegui

GK	(Spain) Manuel Alcalde
DF	(Spain) José Berraondo (c)
DF	(Spain) Joaquín Yarza
MF	(Spain) José Giralt
MF	(France) Enrique Normand
MF	(Spain) Manuel Yarza
FW	(France) Pedro Parages
FW	(Spain) Manuel Prast
FW	(Spain) Antonio Alonso
FW	(Guatemala) Federico Revuelto
FW	(Spain) Armando Giralt

== See also ==
- El Viejo Clásico
