= Dirk Labudde =

German informatician and forensic scientist

- Occupations: Informatician; forensic scientist

Dirk Labudde is a German informatician and forensic scientist who teaches Germany's only course on digital forensics at Hochschule Mittweida.

== Bibliography ==
- Labudde, Dirk; Spranger, Michael (2017-03-27). Forensik in der digitalen Welt: Moderne Methoden der forensischen Fallarbeit in der digitalen und digitalisierten realen Welt (in German). Springer-Verlag. ISBN 9783662538012.
