= Rodrigo Alonso =

Rodrigo Alonso may refer to:

- Rodrigo Alonso (footballer, born 1884) (1884–1965), Spanish footballer
- Rodrigo Alonso (footballer, born 1982), Argentine footballer
- Rodri (footballer, born 2003) (born Rodrigo Alonso Martín), Spanish footballer

== See also ==
- Rodrigo Pérez-Alonso González (born 1978), Mexican lawyer, columnist, academic, and politician
- Rodrigo Afonso, late 15th-century Portuguese colonial administrator
