= Alfredo Gil (disambiguation) =

Alfredo Gil (1915–1999) was a Mexican singer.

Alfredo Gil may also refer to:

- Alfredo Gil (footballer) (1891–1908), Spanish footballer
