= Rodrigo Alonso (footballer, born 1884) =

Spanish footballer (1884–1965)

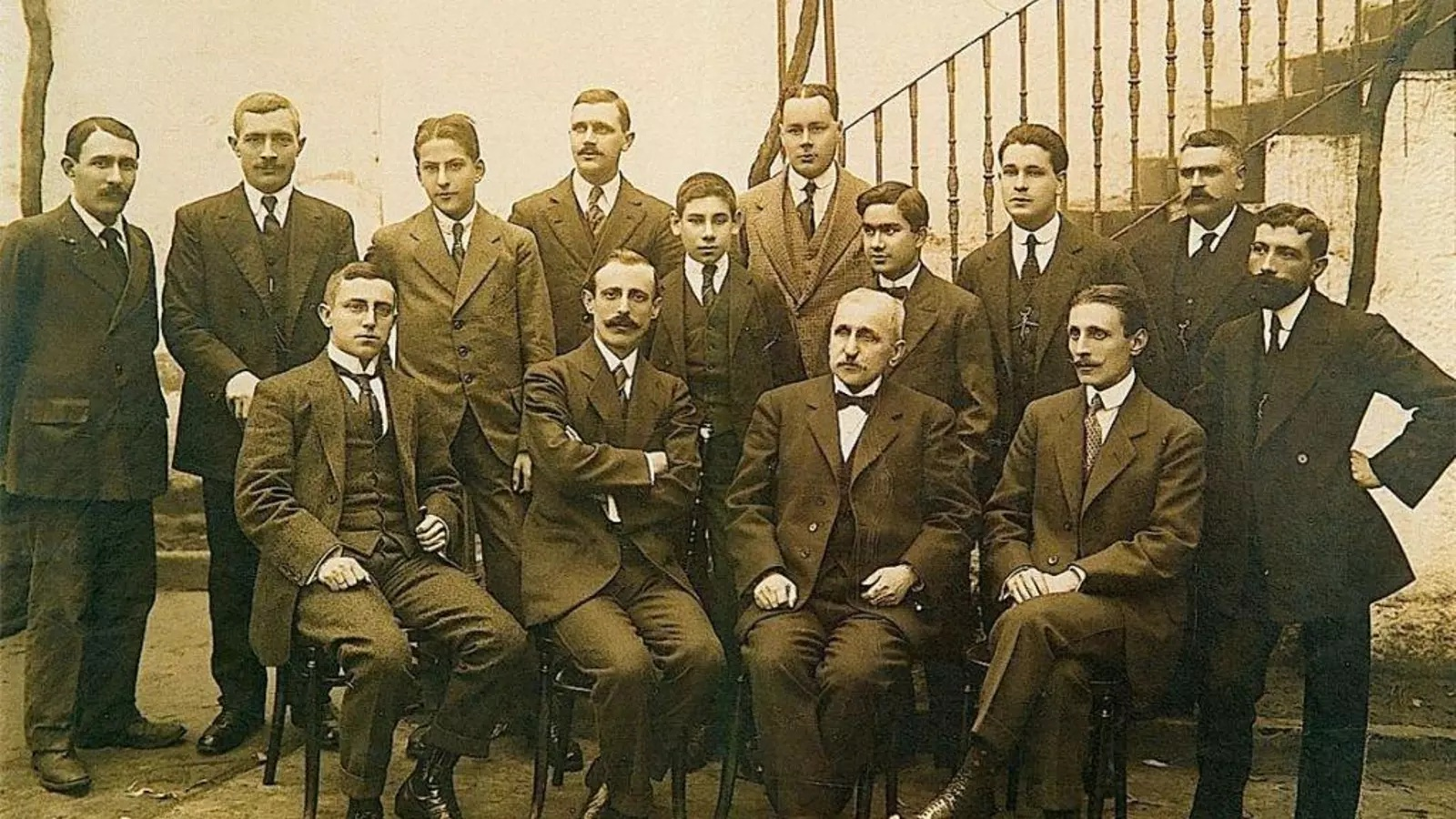

Personal information
- Full name: Rodrigo Alonso Giménez-Cuenca
- Date of birth: 11 August 1884
- Place of birth: Vigo, Spain
- Date of death: 21 October 1965 (aged 81)
- Place of death: Vigo, Spain
- Position: Defender

Senior career*
Years	Team	Apps	(Gls)
1901–1903	Mittweidaer BC		
1904–1906	Vigo FC		
President of Vigo FC
In office
1908–1908
- * Club domestic league appearances and goals

Rodrigo Alonso Giménez-Cuenca (11 August 1884 – 21 October 1965) was a Spanish footballer who played for Vigo FC and who served as its president in 1908. He was the older brother of Antonio, who played for Real Madrid.

== Early life and education ==
Rodrigo Alonso was born in the Galician town of Vigo on 11 August 1884, as the third son of Antonio Alonso Santodomingo and his wife Eloísa Giménez-Cuenca (1860–1935), daughter of an important military man from Matanzas. Like his younger brother Antonio, it is likely that Rodrigo was also sent to Germany to complete his studies at the Hochschule Mittweida University in Saxony, where he began to play for the school's football team, Mittweidaer Ballspiel-Club, which had been founded in 1896 by students.

== Sporting career ==
Alonso was, along with his brothers (Antonio and Mauro) and the Tapias (Rafael and Juan), the first known footballers from Vigo. In 1904, the 20-year-old Rodrigo was already working as a field official. The Alonsos were the first promoters of Vigo FC, founded in 1905, playing a crucial role in helping the club achieve financial stability. Thanks to their friendships, such as that of the deputy Ángel Urzaiz, the club received a silver cup from King Alfonso XIII in 1905 as a clasp to organize the Galician Championships. Later that year, Rodrigo and Antonio were signed by Madrid FC, but while his brother acquired great prominence in the team, Rodrigo soon returned to Vigo FC, becoming its honorary president in May 1905.

The following year, in 1906, Alonso promoted a children's football competition, which was named after him. He became the club's effective president in 1908. He had no qualms about playing a few games for Vigo during his presidencies, mostly as a defender. In addition to football, he also practiced cycling in the early days of Vigo sport. He later served as a director of the local Hunting and Fishing Society, and again president of Vigo in the early 1920s, now called Real Vigo Sporting.

== Later life ==
Rodrigo, along with his brothers Antonio and Mauro, regularly attended the factory of their father, a prominent businessman in the canning sector who paid all three equally, 15% of the annual profit, even though Mauro was the most active. Upon their father's death in 1917, all three of them continued the family business and soon created the Antonio Alonso-Hijos company in 1918. Under the management of Mauro, and with Rodrigo as the head of the sales department, the company experienced great success, becoming one of the main suppliers of canned goods to the Allied armies during the First World War, and later receiving a visit from King Alfonso XIII in 1927. After the Spanish Civil War, the different business styles of Rodrigo and Mauro caused the company to split into two new firms in 1940.

In the 1920s, Alonso commissioned the design for a Galician-style house in Praixal, which was carried out by the Vigo architect Manuel Gómez Román. He also served on several boards of the Galician Canning Manufacturers' Union.

== Death ==
Having married Petra Fariñas in 1906, Alonso died in Vigo on 21 October 1965, at the age of 81. Shortly after his death, his son, Rodrigo Alonso Fariña, replaced Ramón de Castro as the new president of Celta de Vigo.
