= Astorquia =

Astorquia or Astorkia is a Spanish surname. Notable people with the surname include:

- Iratxe Momoitio Astorkia (born 1972), Basque director of the Gernika Peace Museum
- Jugatx Astorkia (born 1992), Basque artist and researcher
- Juan Astorquia (1876–1905), Spanish footballer, captain, and president of Athletic Bilbao
- Luis Astorquia (1883–1963), Spanish footballer
