= Arthur Patschke =

German aether theorist, engineer and opponent of the theory of relativity

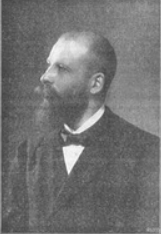
- Born: 13 April 1865; Braniewo
- Died: 1934 (aged 68–69); Berlin
- Occupations: Engineer, writer

Arthur Patschke (13 April 1865 – 1934) was a German aether theorist, engineer and opponent of the theory of relativity.

== Biography ==
Patschke was born in Braniewo, Kingdom of Prussia in the Ermland region of East Prussia. He was the son of a mill owner. Patschke studied at Mittweida College of Technology and graduated in 1887 as a mechanical engineer. During 1912-1914, he studied electrical engineering at the Technische Hochschule in Berlin (now Technische Universität Berlin). He was a designer of steam turbines.

In 1900, he began constructing a rotating steam engine, designed and presented at the Commercial and Industrial Exposition in Düsseldorf in 1902. He also developed a "transverse steam turbine". Patschke was influenced by his professional experience of engineering and aimed to show "that the earth is a universal turbine, a universal ether turbine in large." In 1907, he moved to Berlin and worked for Siemens-Schuckert, a German electrical engineering company.

A strict mechanist, Patschke proposed the "Universal Law of Force", which stated that "bodies floating in gasses (heavenly bodies, planets, atoms) can only move forward when they have received force from behind". His universal mechanical theory (Universal Law of Force) was outlined in his book Elektromechanik, in 1921. His theory held that atoms have central significance since the pressure force from the movement of atoms is the primordial force from which all natural forces originate.

Patschke was an opponent of Albert Einstein's theory of relativity and believed that all mechanical phenomena in the universe could be traced to the activity of tiny aether particles. In Patschke's scientific worldview aether attained a quasi-religious status to unlock all mysteries of the universe. Patschke's theory proposed the existence of "primordial force mass", a universal aether that causes all mechanical phenomena (gravitation, electricity, magnetism, heat, light, and chemical processes).

Patschke stated in numerous publications in the 1920s to have refuted Einstein's theory of relativity. However, his views were ignored by the scientific community. Patschke attacked the theory of relativity in his book with the English title Overthrow of Einstein's Theory of Relativity.

== Selected publications ==
- Transversal-Dampfturbinen für elastische Kraftmittel (1904)
- Lösung der Welträtsel durch das einheitliche Weltgesetz der Kraft (1905)
- Elektromechanik: Einheitliche erklärung und mechanik der naturkräfte (1921)
- Umsturz der Einsteinschen Relativitätstheorie (Overthrow of Einstein's Theory of Relativity, 1922)
