= Josep Soler =

Josep Soler may refer to:

- Josep Soler (football executive) (fl. 1905–1906), Spanish president of Barcelona FC
- Josep Soler (composer) (1935–2022), Spanish composer, writer, and music theorist
