= Virgilio Da Costa =

Portuguese footballer (1881–?)

Personal information
- Full name: Virgilio Da Costa Neves
- Date of birth: 23 September 1881
- Place of birth: Porto, Portugal
- Date of death: unknown
- Place of death: unknown
- Position: Forward

Senior career*
Years	Team	Apps	(Gls)
1900–1904	Mittweidaer BC		
1902–1903	Hispania AC	2	
1903–1906	FC Barcelona	16	(7)
1906–?	FC Porto		
- * Club domestic league appearances and goals

Virgilio Da Costa Neves (23 September 1881 – unknown) was a Portuguese footballer who played as a forward for Spanish club FC Barcelona. He is best known for being the first Portuguese player to wear the FC Barcelona shirt when he played for them in 1903. He was often mentioned in the press of his time as D'Acosta or Da Acosta, and was erroneously considered to be of Italian origin.

== Biography ==
Virgilio Da Costa Neves was born in Porto on 23 September 1881. Between 1900 and 1905 he studied Mechanical Engineering at the Hochschule Mittweida University of Applied Sciences (Saxony, Germany). There he developed an interest in football and began playing for the school's football team, Mittweidaer Ballspiel-Club, which had been founded in 1896 by students. It was around this time that da Costa met the German Udo Steinberg, an industrial and electrical engineering from the same university and who also played for Mittweida BC, and they quickly established a great friendship. In addition to da Costa and Steinberg, Mittweida BC was also the football cradle of the likes of Antonio Alonso from Vigo, Juan Arzuaga, Adolfo Uribe and Luis Astorquia from Bilbao. Steinberg then settled in Barcelona for professional reasons, and so, in 1902, da Costa began to make visits to Barcelona and play sporadically with Hispania AC.

He then played with FC Barcelona between 1903 and 1906, making his debut in an official match on 29 November 1903, in a Catalan Championship fixture against Joventut (3–0), for a total of 11 official matches in the Championship, playing intermittently until his dismissal on 28 February 1906, with his last match being a friendly against the Veterans FC, which also ended in a 3–0 win. In total, he played 16 matches, netting seven goals. Together with the likes of José Quirante, Romà Forns, Udo Steinberg and Carles Comamala, he helped Barça win the 1904–05 Catalan championship.

In 1906 Virgilio Da Costa Neves returned to his native Porto to work as an engineer and his return coincided with the reactivation of Futebol Clube do Porto in 1906, and after his football career in Mittweida and Barcelona, he enthusiastically joined the new project, led by José Monteiro da Costa.

Da Costa was the first Portuguese player for FC Barcelona.

== Honours ==
FC Barcelona

- Catalan championship: 1904–05
