= Antonio Alonso (businessman) =

Spanish businessman

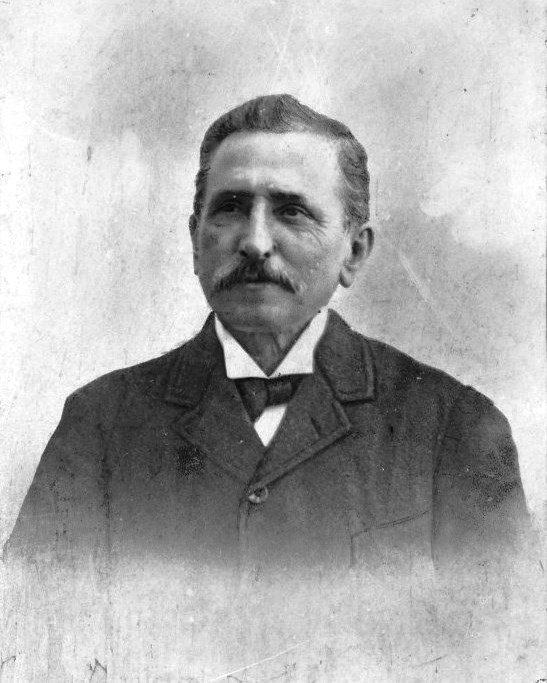
- Antonio Alonso Santodomingo before 1917
- Born: Juan Antonio Alonso Santodomingo; 1844; Bayona, Galicia, Spain
- Died: 10 February 1917 (aged 72–73); Madrid, Spain
- Citizenship: Spanish
- Occupations: Businessman; Industrialist
- Known for: Founder of Palacio de Oriente canning company

Juan Antonio Alonso Santodomingo (1844 – 10 February 1917) was a Spanish businessman in the canning sector, and founder of the Palacio de Oriente canning company. He was the pioneer of the Galician canning industry.

== Biography ==
Antonio Alonso was born in Bayona, Galicia, in 1844, as the son of Juan Antonio Alonso Castro and Rosalía Santodomingo. In 1862, the 18-year-old Alonso emigrated to Havana, when the country was under the sovereignty of the Spanish Empire, where he remained working until 1881 as a commercial intermediary between Cuba and the metropolis (Spain). In Cuba, he married Eloísa Giménez-Cuenca (1860–1935), daughter of an important military man from Matanzas. The couple had six children Pedro, Salvador, Rodrigo, Antonio, Mauro, and Guillermina Alonso Giménez-Cuenca, who married Eduardo Martínez Vázquez, with whom she had Eduardo Martínez Alonso, who went on to become a doctor known for his humanitarian work during the Spanish Civil War and Second World War.

Upon his return to Vigo, Alonso invested in real estate. It is in Vigo where he established contact with the canning industry and in 1886, he began his own initiative, starting with the help of his partner Benito Albela and from 1890 onwards alone. First, he began to export to France, like other Galician canning businessmen, but soon he began to export to new markets such as Montevideo, Mexico, Puerto Rico, and Cuba, especially the latter because he retains friendships and contacts from his time as an emigrant. He diversified the preserves, integrating vegetables, and also the fishing process, building two vessels for fishing bream, said fish was destined to be sold both fresh and pickled. However, his first product was sardines in oil.

Starting in the 1890s, it also began its expansion in the complementary tin foil market, and participated as a shareholder in the launch of a Basque company, Basconia, to compete with the Goitia company, a monopolizer of the tin foil market. Already with part of the management of the canning company shared with his children, he lived through the first sardine crisis, in 1909, from which Palacio de Oriente emerged reinforced by his movements to obtain sardines in Huelva.

== Death ==
Alonso died on 10 February 1917, at the age of either 72 or 73. Upon his death, his children continued the family business saga. His first-born son Pedro, suffering from health problems, did not join the business, and his only daughter Guillermina did not receive the inheritance, so the business saga was continued by Rodrigo, Antonio, Mauro, and Salvador, who in 1918 created the Antonio Alonso-Hijos company. 4 5 6 7

In 2014, the descendants of Antonio Alonso Santodomingo met at the Náutico to strengthen family ties; it was the first time that Antonio Alonso's successors met to exchange memories.
