= Josep de Togores =

Spanish sportsman and film director

- Born: Josep de Togores i Muntades; 26 July 1868; Barcelona, Catalonia, Spain
- Died: 7 September 1926 (aged 58); Saint-Tropez, Provence, Spain
- Citizenship: Spanish
- Occupations: Sportsman; Film Director; Politician
- Known for: 2nd President of the Catalan Football Federation
- Political party: League of Catalonia

Vice-president of the Sportsmen's Club

2nd President of the Catalan Football Federation
- In office 1904–1905
- Preceded by: Eduardo Alesson
- Succeeded by: Josep Soler

Josep de Togores Muntades (26 July 1868 – 7 September 1926) was a Spanish sportsman, film director, art collector, and amateur painter. He was the second president of the Catalan Football Federation (1904–05), and co-founder of Mundo Deportivo (1906).

He was an important figure in the amateur beginnings of football in Catalonia, and sports in general, being noted for his prominent pioneering role in several sports in Catalonia.

== Biography ==
=== Early interests ===
He was born in Barcelona, as the son of Alejo de Togores from Seville and Joana Baptista Muntades Vilardell from Barcelona. A pioneer of several sports in Catalonia, he was a rowing and target shooting champion, but he also practiced swimming, Greco-Roman wrestling, and fencing. He was vice-president of the Sportsmen's Club, the second president of the Association of Football Clubs of Barcelona (1904–05), and the co-founder of Mundo Deportivo (1906).

Togores was a man of wide culture, and as such, in addition to sports, he was also interested in music, and was thus a friend and host to Camille Saint-Saëns, Joaquim Malats, and Enric Granados, with whom he organized concerts at his home. He also collected art and painted as a hobby.

He was a representative of the Belgian company Solvay in Barcelona and a member of the regionalist political group the League of Catalonia. The Spanish writer Eugenio d'Ors described him as an exemplary model of a Europeanized Catalan.

=== Cinematic career ===
His income began to dwindle in the early 1910s, and when he became bankrupt after several unsuccessful businesses, he saw in the world of cinema and filmmaking in 1914, a path that fitted his personality. He began his cinematic work with La festa del blat (1914), based on a play by Àngel Guimerà and produced by Condor Films. This was followed by Dansa fatal (1914), El pollo Tejada (1915), with a plot inspired by the homonymous zarzuela by Carlos Arniches, and photography by Giovanni Doria and Josep María Maristany. With the production cost of his works raising, he began making them with Segre Films, and under this production company, Togores directed eight films. In the film El cuervo del campamento (1915) he shared the artistic direction with Fructuós Gelabert.

Amor de pescadora (1915) features the performance of renowned artists, but it was Un sólo corazón (1915), the film that made the biggest impression on the world of cinema. It was starred by the Guerrero-Mendoza marriage, and it was consecrated as the most brilliant business that the cinematographic annals of Spain achieved until that moment. In some articles, Togores expressed the great opportunity that Spanish cinema had during the war years triggered by the First World War. He believed that Spanish female directors should give evidence of vitality, producing a collection of tapes that could replace the absolute lack of foreign films. The last major production of Togores en la Segre was El sello de oro (1916), starring the eminent dancer Stasia Napierkowska.

He continued with Flor del arroyo, Secrets del mar (1916), and in the following years he made Prova tràgica, which presents it as a series in chapters, Un drama a la muntanya, La pescadora de Tossa, El cavaller Casaroja, El regal de bodes, Un sol cor, and El golfo, which was filmed in Bilbao and San Sebastián, with a Madrid production. His cinema is considered of high quality, with good technical collaborators, ambitious and extensive themes, lavish presentation, and featuring great actors and actresses such as Fernando Díaz de Mendoza, María Guerrero, Lola París, Pastora Imperio, among others. His style was classified as drama (a la Italiana), and this conception increased with the addition of Giovanni Doria to his work team. He tried to capture a quality audience with a theatrical style (even when it approached realism), but despite his films being full of dynamism, they generally appeared related to imaginary and artificial themes of little cinematographic interest. His films were thus guilty of being too theatrical, and the themes being artificial and not very cinematic.

=== Later life ===
After directing sixteen films, the film world brought him more difficulties than financial benefits to the family. Togores' economic situation was precarious, so he decided to meet his son in Paris, where he ended up collaborating in the promotion of the pictorial career of his son Josep de Togores and became an important art collector. He devoted the last years of his life to promoting the work of his son.

After enduring a serious illness he moved to Sant Tropez where he died in 1926. There are very few studies of his work and there are hardly any testimonies of it, except for some restorations, such as that of El pollo de Tejada and El Golfo.
