= Peris (disambiguation) =

Periș is a commune in Ilfov County, Romania.

Peris may also refer to:

== Places ==
- Periş, a village in Gornești Commune, Mureș County, Romania
- Periş, a former village in Independenţa Commune, Constanţa County, Romania
- Periš, a village in Serbia

== People ==
- Peris (surname)

== Other uses ==
- Peris Horseshoe, an annual fell running race in Snowdonia, Wales
- Saint Peris, Welsh saint
- Peris JN-1, an American homebuilt aircraft that was designed by Jim Peris of Lancaster, Pennsylvania

== See also ==
- Perris
- Peri (disambiguation)
