= Colmenarez =

Colmenarez is a surname. Notable people with the surname include:

- Asdrubal Colmenarez (born 1936), Venezuelan contemporary artist
- Rebecca Sarco Colmenarez (born 1994), Venezuelan wrestler

== See also ==
- Colmenares, another surname
