= Lisandro Peris =

Spanish footballer

Personal information
- Full name: Lisandro Peris de Vargas
- Birth name: Llisard Peris de Vargas
- Date of birth: 1891
- Place of birth: Holguín, Cuba
- Date of death: 17 January 1951 (aged 59–60)
- Place of death: Barcelona, Catalonia, Spain
- Position: Goalkeeper

Senior career*
Years	Team	Apps	(Gls)
1909–1913	FC Barcelona	11	(0)
1913–1914	Català FC		
- * Club domestic league appearances and goals

Lisandro Peris de Vargas (1891 – 17 January 1951) was a Spanish footballer who played as a goalkeeper for FC Barcelona in the 1910s. Although he only played 11 games, he won three Catalan Championships and one Pyrenees Cups in 1912. He then joined Català FC, where he played just one season. When he retired from football, he became and worked as a first-class referee.

His brothers Agustin, Joaquim, and Enrique were also outstanding sportsmen and leaders, and like the latter, he also excelled in athletics.

On 20 April 2015, the last descendant of the Peris de Vargas family died in Barcelona, the daughter of Lisandro, the only one of the six siblings (Joaquín, Agustín, Enrique, Lisardo, Clotilde and Carmen) who had children.

== Honours ==
FC Barcelona

- Catalan championship:
  - Champions (3): 1909–10, 1910–11, and 1912–13
- Pyrenees Cup:
  - Champions (1): 1912
