= Rosa Peris Cervera =

Spanish politician

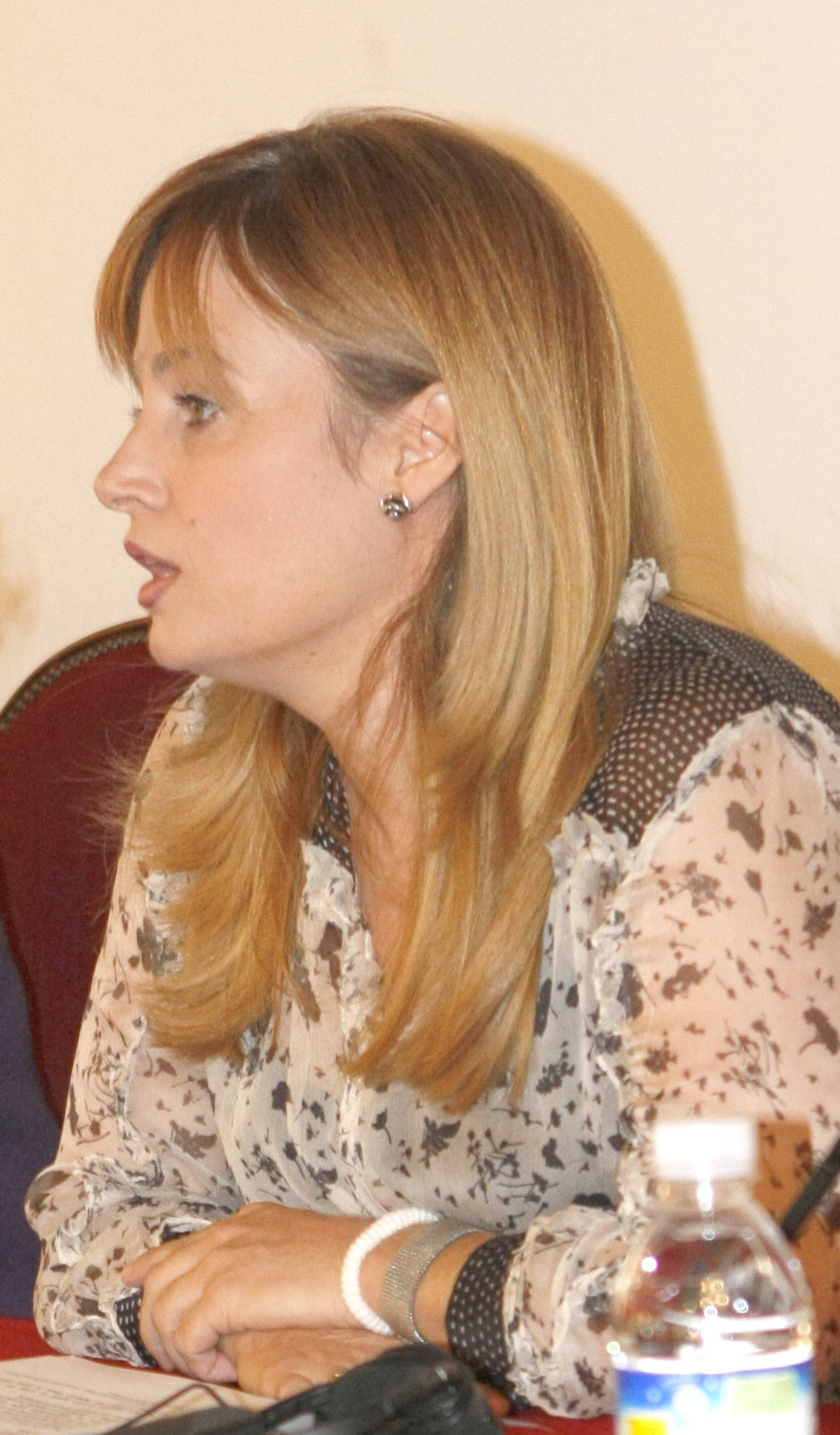

Rosa Peris Cervera (Benaguasil, Spain, 25 February 1969) is a Spanish politician who belongs to the governing Spanish Socialist Workers' Party.

Peris qualified in law and first worked as a lawyer. In 1999 she was elected local councillor for her hometown of Benaguasil and the following year she entered national politics when she was elected to the national parliament as a deputy for Valencia. She did not stand in 2004. Subsequently she served as Director General of the Women's institute of Spain.
