= 1911 Copa del Rey =

10th Copa del Rey

Tournament details
- Country: Spain
- Teams: 10

Final positions
- Champions: Athletic Bilbao (4th title)
- Runners-up: CD Español

Tournament statistics
- Matches played: 8
- Goals scored: 27 (3.38 per match)
- Top goal scorer(s): Antonio Neyra; Andrew Veitch (3 goals)

The Copa del Rey 1911 was the 10th staging of the Copa del Rey, the Spanish football cup competition. It started on 9 April 1911, and concluded on 15 April 1911, with the final, held at the Josaleta Stadium in Getxo, in which Athletic Bilbao lifted the trophy for the 5th time ever with a 3–1 victory over CD Español.

The 1911 edition was characterized as being one of the most turbulent in the history of the tournament following a complaint for improper alignment against the host team of the tournament, Athletic Club. This complaint was unsuccessful, but ended up causing incidents, angry protests from other teams and the withdrawal of several of them; which prevented a normal development of the tournament. Athletic Club played the tournament with up to five players from Club Atlético de Madrid, which at that time was a branch of the Bilbao team.

== Controversies ==
To put an end to the schism of the previous edition (which led to the celebration of two championships), the Spanish Federation accepted to hold the tournament in Vizcaya for the first time.

This tournament had 13 teams enter, but three teams withdrew before it started, and another three teams withdrew during the competition, probably a world record in a European national championship. RC Deportivo de la Coruña and Academia de Ingenieros withdrew before the draw to protest fielding foreign players in the tournament.

During the tournament, there were more protests and threats of withdrawal from some teams for this very fact. For instance, after the first round match between Athletic Bilbao and Fortuna Vigo, Real Sociedad protested the match, claiming the illegal selection of two English players in Athletic's side (Sloop and Martin), who had not been residing in Spain for the necessary time (six months) and barely spoke Spanish, and who were even suspected of being hired professionals. The Spanish FA rejected the protest and Real Sociedad immediately withdrew in protest. After the remaining teams, except the military academies, supported Real Sociedad and most of them threatened to also withdraw, Athletic decided not to use these players in their matches, but declined Fortuna Vigo's request to replay their match, which caused a general discomfort in the rest of the contenders and a feeling of comparative grievance that degenerated into more incidents and withdrawals.

In the quarter-finals, Barcelona defeated Sociedad Gimnástica 4–0, but Gimnástica challenged the match due to improper alignment of goalkeeper Luis Reñé, who had played with FC Espanya less than a month ago (thus failing to fulfill the six-month regulation). Faced with this complaint, the Spanish FA ordered a replay of the match, but Barcelona refused to do so citing the case of English players at Athletic Bilbao, so Barcelona was disqualified and Gimnástica qualified for the next round.

Both semi-final matches ended in withdrawals, with Sociedad Gimnástica retiring in the second half (with Athletic Bilbao leading 2–0) in protest at the referee's permissiveness of rough conduct of their opponents (although another version states that they only decided to end the game early to not miss the train they had to take that same day to Madrid). In the second semi-final, both teams withdrew before the game, Academia de Caballería because its players were urgently needed in their regiment while CD Español did so in solidarity with Fortuna de Vigo. The tournament was going to end in a regrettable and chaotic manner, without a final being played, but finally CD Español reconsidered their boycott stance and decided to stay in Getxo and challenge Athletic for the title in the final, losing 3–1.

This dispute was a major factor in Athletic Bilbao's decision to select only local Basque players from then on, a club policy which survived into the 21st century. English forward Andrew Veitch (who was not part of the protest as he had already played for the club in the previous year's competition) was the last foreigner to make a competitive appearance for Athletic outside the boundaries of their self-imposed criteria.

== Preliminary round ==
9 April 1911

Athletic Bilbao	2–0	Fortuna Vigo
Andrew Veitch 8'; Alejandro Smith Ybarra 60'	Report

Josaleta Stadium, Getxo
Referee: (Spain) Tojo

9 April 1911

Bilbao FC	2–1	Academia de Artillería
Adrián Ochandiano 5', 45'	Report	Luis Marañón 40'

Josaleta Stadium, Getxo
Referee: (Spain) José Berraondo (CD Español)

== Quarterfinals ==
10 April 1911

CD Español	6–0	Academia de Infantería
Antonio Neyra 10', 20'; Alfredo Massana 15', 30'; Armando Giralt 35', 40'	Report

Josaleta Stadium, Getxo
Referee: (Spain) Juan Arzuaga (Athletic Bilbao)
10 April 1911

Academia de Caballería	1–0	Santander FC
Pereda (1T)	Report

Josaleta Stadium, Getxo
Referee: (Spain) Eduardo Moronati
12 April 1911

FC Barcelona	4–0 (Note: After the match, Gimnástica lodged a protest about FC Barcelona's improper alignment of goalkeeper Luis Reñé, who had played with FC Espanya less than a month ago. The Football Federation declared the match null and void and ordered a replay, but FC Barcelona refused to participate, noting that Athletic Bilbao had fielded English players; FC Barcelona was disqualified.)	Sociedad Gimnástica
Percy Wallace 30', 70'; George Patullo 60'; Francisco Baonza 80'	Report

Josaleta Stadium, Getxo
Referee: (Spain) Ramón Rodríguez
12 April 1911

Athletic Bilbao	4–1	Bilbao FC
Severino Zuazo 20'; José María Belauste 40'; Remigio Iza 50'; Evaristo Arbaiza 60'	Report	Pichichi 70'

Josaleta Stadium, Getxo
Referee: (England) Andrew Veitch

== Semifinals ==
14 April 1911

Athletic Bilbao	2–0	Sociedad Gimnástica
Andrew Veitch; Severino Zuazo	Report

Josaleta Stadium, Getxo
Referee: (England) Heslop
14 April 1911

CD Español	Not played	Academia de Caballería

Josaleta Stadium, Getxo

== Final ==
15 April 1911

Athletic Bilbao	3–1	CD Español
Andrew Veitch 10'; Luis Belaunde 20'; Manuel Guernica 50'	Report	Antonio Neyra 70'

Josaleta Stadium, Getxo
Referee: (England) Scott Martyr

Copa del Rey 1911 Winners
Athletic Bilbao
4th Title
