= Matias Colmenares =

Spanish footballer

Personal information
- Full name: Matias Colmenares Errea
- Birth name: Matías Colmenares Errea
- Date of birth: 28 November 1884
- Place of birth: Estella, Navarre, Spain
- Date of death: 15 February 1937 (aged 52)
- Place of death: Cerdanyola del Vallès, Spain
- Position: Forward

Senior career*
Years	Team	Apps	(Gls)
1902–1906	FC Internacional		
1906–1908	FC Barcelona	3	(0)
1908–1909	Galeno		
1909–1910	RCD Espanyol		
- * Club domestic league appearances and goals

Matias Colmenares Errea (27 February 1887 – 17 February 1953) was a Spanish footballer who played as a forward, as well as a referee, architect, journalist, and politician. After finishing his degree in architecture in Barcelona, he played for Barcelona FC and RCD Espanyol, and later became president of the National College of Referees. After hanging up his boots, and his whistle, he designed the Sarrià Stadium in Barcelona for Espanyol in 1923.

== Club career ==
Born in Estella, Navarre, he moved to Barcelona to study architecture in 1902, at the age of 18, and he obtained his degree in 1910. During these years he began his footballing career at FC Internacional in 1902. Together with Paco Bru, the Peris brothers (Agustin and Enrique), and Charles Wallace, he helped the club achieve three successive runner-up finishes in the Catalan championship between 1904 and 1906, losing out on the title to a different opponent each time, Club Español (now RCD Espanyol) FC Barcelona and X Sporting Club respectively. In 1906, the club had to suspend its activities due to a lack of players, so most of the players, including him, joined Barcelona in the 1906–07 season. He was thus the very first Navarrese to play for Barça. During his two years at the Blaugrana club, he played three official matches, but failed to score in any of them. Colmenares then played one season in AC Galeno before retiring at RCD Espanyol in 1910.

== Refereeing career ==
After he retired as a player, he stayed in close contact with football as a referee, becoming the president of the National College of Referees in 1922.

== Architectural career ==
He was a municipal architect in Haro (1912) and Estella (1913/23), where he built Plaça de Braus (1917), the Bullring, the Peñaguda cross (he made the plans and the project of the cross while the realization was entrusted to a certain Mr. Cañete), and designed a brilliant and necessary boulevard, still in the approval process a century later. His most important work as an architect was designing the largest stadium in Spain at the time, the Sarrià Stadium, whose construction began on 31 December 1922 under the supervision of Colmenares, and the cost was 170,000 pesetas. He also designed the Féculas-Navarra station, which was part of the Lodosa starch factory, inaugurated in 1912 and dedicated to the manufacture of starch from potatoes. This station was the only one of his kind in Navarra because Colmenares, an eclectic and worldly architect, designed it in a unique modernist style with a strong influence of elegant Austrian secessionism, as if a little piece of Vienna had landed there. Some sources list him as an official second-class architect of the La Coruña province.

In Estella, he created the weekly La Merindad Estellesa and La Teatral Estellesa, and was the founder of the Gazeta Estellesa.

== Death ==
During the 1930s he began to intervene in politics, with an extreme right-wing orientation. In 1935 he presided over the newly created Frente Españolista party. On 15 February 1937, in the middle of the Spanish Civil War, he was captured and arrested in Barcelona by a militia patrol during one of his construction visits and killed in the Cerdanyola del Vallès cemetery.
