= Mittweidaer BC =

German association football club

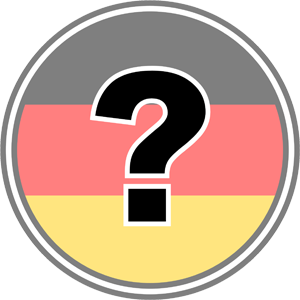
- Full name: Mittweidaer Ballspielclub e.V.
- Founded: 1896
- Dissolved: 1945
- 2006–07: defunct
Home colours	Away colours

Mittweidaer Ballspielclub, or simply Mittweidaer BC, was a German association football club from the town of Mittweida, Saxony. The club is notable as the first side in the city and as a founding member of the DFB (Deutsche Fußball Bund or German Football Association) at Leipzig on 28 January 1900 at Zum Mariengarten. In addition to a football side, the club had departments for athletics and tennis.

== History ==
Mittweidaer Ballspielclub was founded on 5 May 1896 by 12 students of the Mittweida technical school. The club's first chairman was Udo Steinberg, who acted as a delegate of both BC and Chemnitz SC Britannia (predecessor of Chemnitzer FC) at the founding meeting of the DFB.

Steinburg moved to Spain late in 1900 and became active in football and sports there. Mittweidaer BC became the source of some of the first Spanish football stars, such as Antonio Alonso and Adolfo Uribe from Vigo, Juan Arzuaga from Bilbao, and Virgilio Da Costa and Udo Steinberg from Barcelona. Another well-known member of the MBC is the multiple 110 meter hurdles German champion Vincenz Duncker.

BC played in the Mitteldeutscher Ballspiel-Verband as an anonymous local side through most of its history with a few exceptions.The team won the 1906-07 Gau Southwest Saxony title and then took part in the league playoffs where they were put out 6:0 by VfB Leipzig in a semi-final contest. They played first class football in the Gauliga Südwestsachsen until the 1915–16 season, making a playoff appearance that year, advancing past VfB Glauchau and SpVgg Leipzig before being eliminated 7:0 by Eintracht Leipzig.

The club slipped to lower level play until promotion to second divion play in the 1938–39 season as part of the combined wartime side TSG Mittweida alongside Germania Mittweida during World War II. In the war shortened 1944–45 season, they played only a handful of matches as part of Kriegspielgemeinschaft Mittweida in the collection of local circuits making up the Gauliga Sachsen (I). BC was lost after the war, while Germania re-emerged as SG Mittweida and appeared in the first division Landesliga Sachsen in 1948–49 before slipping to lower level play.
