= Octavio Colmenares =

Mexican footballer (born 1989)

Personal information
- Full name: Octavio Jibrán Colmenares Fayad
- Date of birth: 19 August 1989 (age 37)
- Place of birth: Mexico City, Mexico
- Height: 1.85 m (6 ft 1 in)
- Position: Goalkeeper

Youth career
- 2004–2008: Universidad de Chile

Senior career*
Years	Team	Apps	(Gls)
2009	Universidad de Chile	1	(0)
2010–2012	Pumas Morelos	8	(0)
2011–2012	UNAM	0	(0)
2012	Everton	0	(0)
2013	Barnechea	2	(0)
Total		11	(0)
- * Club domestic league appearances and goals

Octavio Jibrán Colmenares Fayad (born 19 August 1989) is a Mexican former footballer who played as a goalkeeper.

== Career ==
Colmenares made his debut for Universidad de Chile in May 2009 against Cobresal.

In the 2010 Liga de Ascenso Apertura season he made one league appearance for Pumas Morelos.

== Personal life ==
His father of the same name, is a Mexican businessman who was one of the main stockholders of Universidad de Chile when he was a player of them.

He naturalized Chilean by residence, since he came to Chile at the age of fourteen.

== Honours ==
Universidad de Chile

- Primera División de Chile: 2009 Apertura
