= Jolaseta Stadium =

Football stadium in Getxo, Spain

- Interactive map of Jolaseta Stadium
- Full name: Jolaseta Stadium
- Location: Getxo, Spain

Construction
- Opened: 1910
- Closed: 1925

Tenants
- Arenas Club de Getxo (1913—1925); Athletic Bilbao (1910—1913)

Jolaseta Stadium or Campo de Jolaseta was the football main stadium of Arenas Club de Getxo, Getxo in the neighboring district of Neguri, between 1910 and 1925. In 1925 they moved to Campo de Ibaiondo, later Campo de Gobela till 2004, and since 2004 they have had a new modern stadium Campo Municipal de Gobela.

Athletic Bilbao also played there for 3 years before moving to San Mamés.

Jolaseta Stadium hosted the 1911 Copa del Rey Final when Athletic Bilbao won 3—1 against CD Español.
