= Melcior Marial =

Spanish engineer and politician

- Born: Melcior Marial y Mundet; 12 June 1887; Barcelona, Catalonia, Spain
- Died: Unknown; Unknown
- Occupations: Politician; Engineer
- Known for: Deputy of Spain for Girona

Melcior Marial Mundet (12 June 1887 – Unknown) was a Spanish federal engineer and politician during the Second Spanish Republic.

He was the son of fellow politician Juli Marial Tey and brother of FC Barcelona president Juli Marial.

== Early and personal life ==
Melcior Marial was born in Barcelona on 12 June 1887, as the son of architect and politician Juli Marial Tey and Caterina Mundet i Farreras, and the younger brother of Juli Marial.

Marial married Berthe Willote i Rossel, and the couple had two children, Alicia, writer, and Juli, engineer.

== Political career ==
Marial was part of the Madrid municipal committee of the Federal Democratic Republican Party, of which he was one of its leaders, at least since August 1929, and its top leader since May 1931. This grouping, like other local and provincial organizations, endowed with great autonomy, it continued to be part of the Republican Alliance. Although the new federal national leadership established in 1930 was not admitted to the Republican revolutionary committee and, therefore, was not represented in the lists of the Republican–Socialist Conjunction in the 1931 Spanish local elections, the federal assemblies that were part of the Alliance did, thus obtaining a place in the list of the Conjunction for the elections to Constituent Courts in the constituency of Madrid capital, which was occupied by Marial. He obtained 106,879 votes, being the Republican member of the candidacy that obtained fewer votes.

In the Congress, Marial was integrated into the federal minority, formed by federalists also chosen in republican-socialist lists, and of a moderate character, presided over by José Franchy y Roca. During the discussion of the constitution, Marial, like the rest of his co-religionists, promoted the definition of the new State as a federal republic, without achieving it. In the final period of the constituent legislature, when Franchy Roca joined the government as Minister of Industry and Commerce, Marial was director general of Commerce (June-September 1933). He was also Director General of Labor in the last cabinet of the legislature, with Diego Martínez Barrio as President of the Government and Carles Pi i Sunyer of the Republican Left of Catalonia as Minister of Labor.

In the 1933 Spanish general election, the Republican Left of Catalonia was willing to include members of the federal party in its lists, so Marial was a candidate for the province of Girona. He was also part of the left-wing Republican candidacy for Madrid, composed of Republican Action, independent radical-socialists, left-wing independents, and federalists. The results in Madrid were bad, and he was the third least voted candidate of the candidacy, which for his part was only the fourth most voted, without obtaining representation. However, in Girona he was chosen.

Marial was imprisoned after the events of 6 October, but released in December of that year. Despite being part of the parliamentary minority of Esquerra Catalana, Marial also joined the new federal party created in 1935 and headed by Franchy Roca and Arauz, Esquerra Federal, of which he was vice-president.

After the victory of the Popular Front in the 1936 Spanish general electionel, he was named president of the Coordinating Council of the National Economy, dependent on the Ministry of Industry, being Minister Plácido Álvarez-Buylla. He remained in office after the start of the Spanish Civil War, when on 25 July 1936, he was named first president of the Committee for Provisional Intervention in Industries. that he had to take control of the confiscated factories. The council was abolished on 28 September of the same year.

On 30 August 1936, Minister Álvarez-Buylla appointed him president of the executive committee of the General Electricity Council.

== Bibliography ==
- Avilés Farré, Juan (2006). La Izquierda burguesa y la tragedia de la II República [The bourgeois Left and the tragedy of the Second Republic]. Madrid: Comunidad de Madrid. ISBN 84-451-2881-7.
- Millares Cantero, Agustín (1997). Franchy Roca y los federales en el "Bienio Azañista" [Franchy Roca and the federals in the "Azañista Biennium"]. Las Palmas de Gran Canaria: Ediciones del Cabildo Insular de Gran Canaria. ISBN 84-810-3125-9.
- Tusell, Javier (1970). La Segunda República en Madrid. Elecciones y partidos políticos [The Second Republic in Madrid. Elections and political parties]. Madrid: Tecnos. ISBN 84-259-1152-4.
