= Josep Soler (football executive) =

Spanish football executive

- Born: Josep Soler; Unknown; Barcelona, Spain
- Died: Unknown; Barcelona, Spain
- Occupations: Footballer; Football executive
- Known for: President of FC Barcelona

5th President of FC Barcelona
- In office 6 October 1905 – 6 October 1906
- Preceded by: Arthur Witty
- Succeeded by: Juli Marial

3rd President of the Catalan Football Federation
- In office 1905 – February 1906
- Preceded by: Josep de Togores
- Succeeded by: Udo Steinberg

Josep Soler was a Spanish football executive, who was the fifth president of FC Barcelona as well as the third president of Catalan Football Federation in 1905 and 1906. The dates of his birth and death are unknown.

== Biography ==
Josep Soler was elected as the fifth President of FC Barcelona on 6 October 1905, in an assembly, something common in the club at the beginning of the 20th century, thus replacing Arthur Witty. His mandate lasted just one year since it ended exactly one year later, on 6 October 1906. His presidency was characterized by difficulties of all kinds, including a social crisis, due to a lack of activity within the entity and the decline in members (at one point as few as only 198), as well as an economic and sporting crisis, including the infamous 10–1 defeat to Athletic Bilbao on 15 April 1906.

Furthermore, at the time, the Catalan Football Federation was extremely unsupportive of FC Barcelona, which in the 1905–06 season led to a major scandal. Despite winning every game, Barça were stripped of their Copa Salud title because in the deciding match, won 3–1 against X Sporting Club, an appeal was made against Barça because they were not wearing regulation kit. This outrageous protest received the Federation's support, who ordered for the match to be replayed. FC Barcelona refused to play, and so X were automatically declared champions of the tournament. On 16 October 1906, he was replaced by Juli Marial, who was elected as the sixth President of FC Barcelona by the members' assembly, and just like Soler, he ultimately failed to successfully steer the club through these difficult times in both social and sporting terms.

Soler is the only president of Barcelona throughout its centenary history that remains shrouded in mystery, as besides his presidency, little is known about his life. It is speculated that, in addition to being president, he was a player, since at that time the club was a group of friends where the players also belonged to the board of directors. At the time, there were two Solers on the squad, Joan Soler, Barça's goalkeeper, and Josep Maria Soler, a defender, which led many to believe that this defender and the president might have been the same person, but the Center dismissed this hypothesis.

== Legacy ==
In June 2011, the Documentation and Studies Center of FC Barcelona detected an error with Soler's photograph in the image gallery of the presidents of the club, as the man in the image was actually identified as a photograph of Manuel Solé, the director of the gym that bore his name where FC Barcelona had been founded in 1899. Carles Santacana, the director of the Documentation and Studies Center of FC Barcelona, recognized a "documentation gap" in the club's archives, and therefore, on 24 June 2011, the club launched a public appeal to obtain a photo of President Soler, because he is the only one who does not have one, thus earning him the nickname of "the faceless President". Santacana urged the culés to investigate their respective memories in order to find the face of Soler; all of the photos that were sent to the club's address can be found on the club's website. As of today, nobody has located a photograph of J. Soler. After this discovery, the club immediately removed the erroneous photograph from its website and also from the Museum.

Even though his presidency was marked by a social and sporting crisis, Santacana asserted that "without him, surely the following would not have arrived".
