= Juli Marial Tey =

Spanish architect, politician, and deputy (1853–1929)

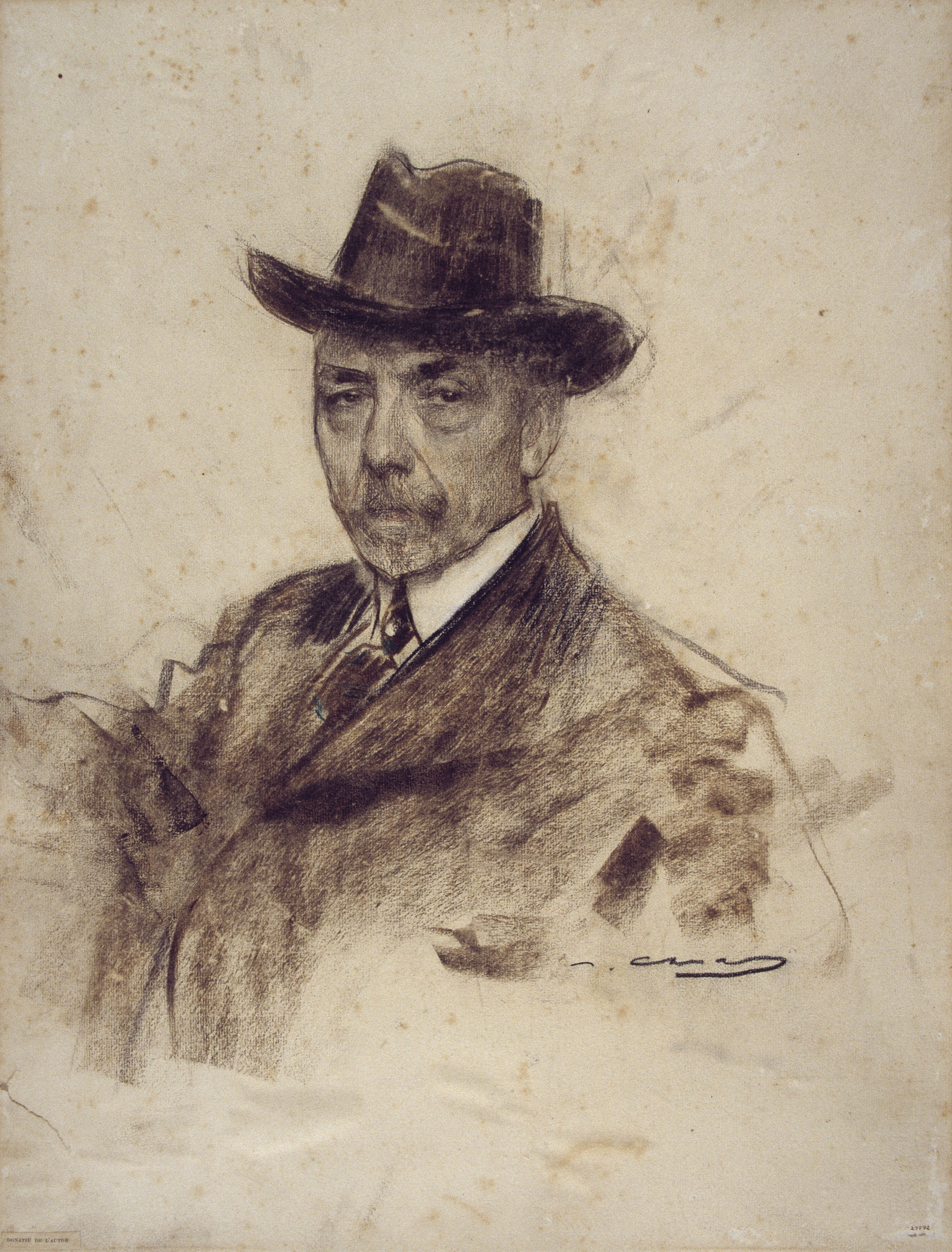
- Born: Juli Miquel Enric Marial i Tey; 20 April 1853; Barcelona, Spain
- Died: 16 August 1929 (aged 76); Barcelona, Spain
- Occupations: Politician; Architect
- Known for: President of FC Barcelona

Congress of Deputies
- In office 30 April 1907 – 14 April 1910
- Preceded by: Francisco Brauget-Massanet
- Succeeded by: Salvador Albert

Juli Miquel Enrique Marial Tey (20 April 1853 – 16 August 1929) was a Spanish architect, politician, and deputy in the Cortes Españolas during the Bourbon restoration.

== Biography ==
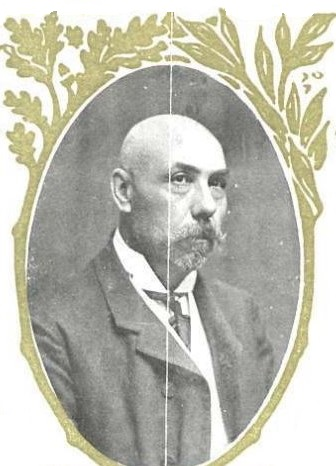
Juli Marial i Tey 1907

Juli Miquel Enric Marial Tey was born in Carrer de Gombau in Barcelona as the son of Miquel Marial Sola and Antònia Tey Torra.

He was initially a member of the Federal Democratic Republican Party, and together with José María Vallés y Ribot, he formed the Barcelona section of the Republican Union in 1903. In 1901 he was elected councilor of the City Council of Barcelona and in 1905 he was one of those who facilitated the agreement with Banco Hispano Colonial to resolve the municipal deficit. In the 1907 Spanish general election, he supported the candidacy of Catalan Solidarity and was elected deputy for the Bisbal district. In 1906 he was part of the Republican Nationalist Centre and in 1910 of the Republican Nationalist Federal Union, from which he would be expelled in 1913. Again councilor of Barcelona in 1909, he also participated in the municipalization of the water company of Barcelona in 1912. In 1913 he joined the Radical Republican Party.

As an architect, he participated in the construction of Casa Marsans (1907), Casa Heribert Salas (1911–1929), and the Sant Miquel Tower in la Garriga (1886), which was modified in 1916 by Marceliano Coquillat.

He had been married to Caterina Mundet Ferreras, of whom he was widowed in 1904. His son Melcior Marial was a politician elected deputy for Madrid, while Juli Marial was president of FC Barcelona.

Juli Marial died in Barcelona on 16 August 1929, at the age of 76.
