= Germania Mittweida =

German association football club

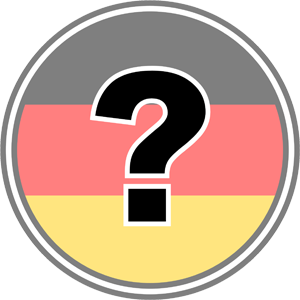
- Full name: Sportverein Germania Mittweida
- Founded: 1897
Home colours	Away colours

SV Germania Mittweida is a German association football club from the town of Mittweida, Saxony. The 280 member sports club has departments for football, gymnastics and general sport.

Germania Mittweida was established on May 16, 1897, as the football club FC Germania Mittweida. In their first game on May 11, 1899, they were beaten 2:3 by Mittweidaer BC, a founding club of the Deutscher Fussball Bund. The team played in the Verbandes Mitteldeutscher Ballspiel-Vereine, and in 1909-10 took part in a regional playoff in the Mitte Südwestsachsen division where they were defeated 2:4 by VfB Leipzig.

In a 1925-30 merger with SC Hellas 1908 Chemnitz, they competed in the 1a-class in the Gau Mittelsachsen as SC Germania-Hellas Mittweida.

Germania became part of the wartime side Kriegspielgemeinschaft Mittweida with local rival BC in 1944. The combined side played in the first division Gauliga Sachsen. That club was lost in 1945 and later re-established as SG Mittweida in East German football. They played a single season in the Landesliga Sachsen/Chemnitz, but slipped to local level competition after a fourth-place result. In 1952, SG was renamed BSG Einheit Mittweida and played in the Bezirksliga Karl-Marx-Stadt (III) until 1964 with the exception of a single season demotion in 1959 before then becoming part of lower level local competition again.

After the reunification of Germany in 1990, BSG re-adopted its historical pre-war identity as SV Germania Mittweida and in 1996 became part of the Bezirksklasse Chemnitz (VIII). Since the 2011–12 season SV has been part of the Sachsenliga (VI).
