= Juan Arzuaga =

Spanish footballer (1880–1951)

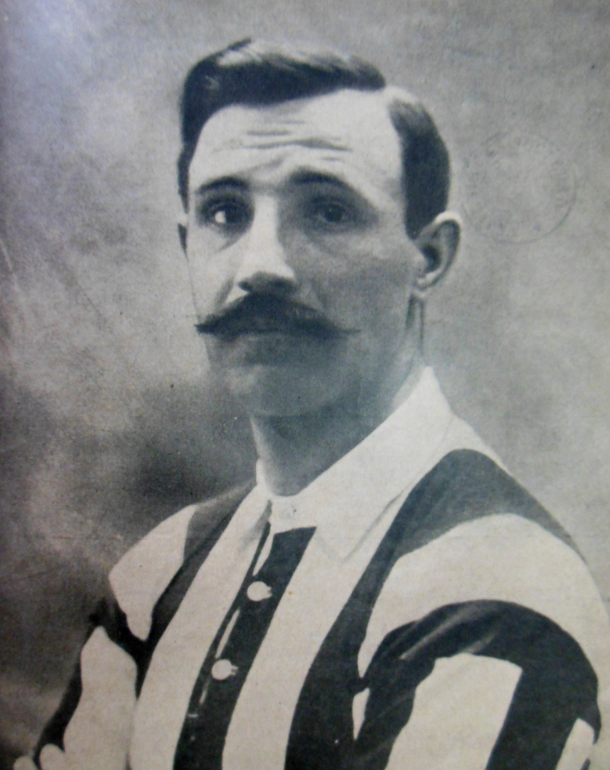
- Arzuaga in 1911

Personal information
- Full name: Juan Sandalio Arzuaga Anitua
- Date of birth: 3 September 1880
- Place of birth: Bilbao, Spain
- Date of death: 26 August 1951 (aged 70)
- Place of death: Logroño, Spain
- Position: Defender

Senior career*
Years	Team	Apps	(Gls)
1902–1904	Mittweidaer BC		
1904–1905	San Sebastián RC		
1905–1906	Athletic Club		
1906–1907	Bizcaya		
1907–1912	Athletic Club		
1912–1914	Club Deportivo Bilbao		

International career
1913	Spain (unofficial)	1	(1)

Managerial career
- 1921–1922: Athletic Club
- * Club domestic league appearances and goals

Juan Sandalio Arzuaga Anitua (3 September 1880 – 26 August 1951) was a Spanish footballer who played as a defender for Athletic Club, and later a referee, and then a coach of Athletic.

== Early life and education ==
Juan Arzuaga was born in Bilbao on 3 September 1880, and was baptized on the following day, in the Church of San Nicolás, Bilbao in the Biscay capital. As a child, Arzuaga studied in England for four years, between 1898 and 1902, appearing in the 1901 census in Gateshead, south of the Tyne and in County Durham. According to the data, he was a naval engineering student and lived with a family in the area, so it is therefore very likely that he was undertaking training at one of the shipyards on the Tyne and Wear.

Arzuaga then moved to Saxony, Germany, to study Mechanical Engineering at the Mittweida technical school, doing so between 1902 and 1904.

== Sporting career ==
=== Rugby career ===
While studying in Britain, Arzuaga stood out on the rugby fields, especially in Northumberland and Durham counties, in the north of England. He was a very talented athlete and this is confirmed by the chronicles of the English newspapers that reported on him from November 1898, when he had just turned 18, until the spring of 1902. The first account of him playing an official match is for North Durham against Sunderland (which had two future internationals) in February 1901 at Ashbrooke ground, which ended in a 31–3 loss, with Arzuaga scoring the three penalty points for his club. In his last season with the club in 1901–02, he received high praise, especially for his powerful and magnificent kick and for his success in converting tries into goals. In November, he scored two tries in a victory against Durham School, one of them superbly taken from the 25-yard line. In December, he scored the only try in a narrow defeat to the tough coal miners' team, Hamsteels. In January 1902, he was decisive in a 5–5 draw against the powerful Northern of Northumberland, scoring all the points and achieving a try by taking the ball from the defender and crossing the line at full speed.

Arzuaga then moved to Rockliff (now Whitley Bay Rockcliff RFC), probably because he was hired after these impressive performances, with Rockliff being at that time one of the main teams in the north of England. In many of his matches with the club, he played on one wing, while Englishman Tom Simpson (11 games played for the English team) played on the other. His first known match with Rockliff took place against West Hartlepool in mid-January 1902. It is said that he played "a bad game", but a journalist from the Newcastle Journal endorsed his speed and acknowledged that he would be as successful as Simpson in the near future. The same reporter also noted that the Rockliff crowd, bewildered by his name, gave him the nickname "XYZ", the name of a famous racehorse still remembered in an annual race at Newcastle's Gosforth Park. In February he played against Durham City and Carlisle; in the latter, he "dribbled with speed down the line and scored" in an 11–6 victory. In March 1902, he scored a try against both Percy Park and in a return match against Carlisle.

On 6 March he scored two tries in the County Cup victory against Walker RFC and was tipped as a major danger in the final against Percy Park and he lived up to it by helping Rockliff to a 9–0 win over them in the final. According to the press, he was now playing with confidence and was indomitable. On 28 March, Arzuaga helped Rockliff to a 9–0 victory over the mighty Northampton, in front of 5,000 spectators. In April 1902, Rockliff made a tour in Wales, playing against Swansea in front of 15,000 Welsh spectators, but in a match against Newport, a very important team at that time, he was injured and his side had to play the second half with one less player. He then lost his last match for the club 9–8 to Hartlepool Rovers, in which he narrowly missed a couple of drop goals. In the club's annual dinner at the end of April 1902, his departure from the North East was imminent, and as a result, he was presented with a gold medal for his efforts on the rugby field. He stated that he would love to play again with the club's red and yellow colors (which are still the current ones) as they reminded him of his country's flag. When he moved to Germany, he was already playing rugby at a very high level, and his departure from Rockliff marked the end of his rugby career, although he may have played some rugby in Germany

=== Football career ===
During his spell in Mittweida, Arzuaga began playing football with Mittweidaer Ballspiel-Club, the school's football team, which had been founded in 1896 by students. In Mittweida, he gained popularity as a football and rugby player, as well as a referee. When he returned to Bilbao, settling in San Sebastián, he did so with great knowledge about football, which was only beginning to take shape in Spain. He was among the founding members of San Sebastián Recreation Club, which was the very first football club in San Sebastián. He then became one of the first footballers of the newly formed club in 1904, thus beginning his footballing career at the advanced age of 24. Together with Alfonso Sena, he was part of the Recreation Club that played in the 1905 Copa del Rey.

At Recreation Club, he stood out for his defensive skills, which earned him a move to Athletic Club in 1905, making his competitive debut on 11 April 1906, at the 1906 Copa del Rey, in a 2–1 win over Recreativo de Huelva, but he did not play in the final against Madrid FC, and without him, Athletic conceded 4 goals in a 1–4 loss. In 1907, the best players from Athletic and Unión Vizcaino came together to form Bizcaya, which was specially created to take part in the 1907 Copa del Rey, and Arzuaga was elected into the team, forming a defensive partnership with his former Recreation Club teammate, Alfonso Sena of Vizcaino, which played a very important role in helping Bizcaya reach the final, and this time he started and nearly kept a clean-sheet, but they lost to Madrid once again, courtesy of a late goal from Manuel Prast.

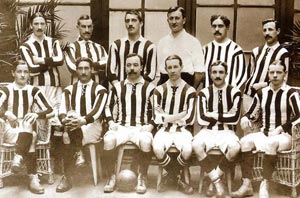
Arzuaga (standing, first from right) with the Athletic Bilbao team in 1910.

Arzuaga was a member of the Athletic side that won back-to-back Copa del Rey titles in 1910 and 1911, helping his side keep a clean-sheet in the 1910 final (UECF) in a 1–0 win over Vasconia, the name under which the newly founded Real Sociedad played. He became the captain of the team in 1911. He remained loyal to Athletic until 1912, when the club decided that the low form of an aging Arzuaga did not allow him to continue defending the colours of Athletic, so he was dropped from the first team, and eventually, he left and joined Club Deportivo Bilbao, with whom he retired in 1914 at the age of 34.

=== International career ===
On 25 May 1913, the 33-year-old Juan Arzuaga went down in history as one of the eleven footballers who played in the very first unofficial game of the Spanish national team at Estadio de Amute in Hondarribia. They faced a French national side represented by the USFSA, and it was Arzuaga (playing as a forward on the day) who netted an 85th-minute equalizer to salvage a 1–1 draw.

== Refereeing career ==
Arzuaga participated in the 1911 Copa del Rey as both a player and a referee, winning the cup as the former and overseeing one match as the latter, a quarterfinal clash between CD Español and Academia de Infantería on 10 April, which ended in a 6–0 victory to Español.

== Managerial career ==
As a coach, Arzuaga managed Athletic Bilbao from 3 December 1921 until 20 March 1922.

== Death ==
Arzuaga died in Logroño on 26 August 1951, at the age of 70.

== Honours ==
Athletic Bilbao

- Copa del Rey: 1910, 1911; runner-up 1907 (Note: as Club Bizcaya.)

== See also ==
- List of Athletic Bilbao managers
