= 1906 Copa del Rey =

4th Copa del Rey

Tournament details
- Country: Spain
- Teams: 3

Final positions
- Champions: Madrid FC (2nd title)
- Runners-up: Athletic Bilbao

Tournament statistics
- Matches played: 3
- Goals scored: 11 (3.67 per match)
- Top goal scorer(s): (Spain) Pedro Parages (4 goals)

The Copa del Rey 1906 was the 4th staging of the Copa del Rey, the Spanish football cup competition.

The competition started on 9 April 1906, and concluded on 11 April 1906 with the last group stage match. Madrid FC lifted the trophy for the second time with two victories, over Recreativo de Huelva and Athletic Bilbao, with the three teams that entered the tournament playing in a triangular.

The X Sporting Club, Catalonia championship winners, did not enter the tournament due to internal dissent and the excessive costs of travelling to Madrid.

Almost all of the Recreativo de Huelva team players were English.

== Group stage ==
9 April 1906

Madrid FC	3–0	Recreativo de Huelva
Josè Giralt 20'; Federico Revuelto 40'; Pedro Parages 60'	Report

Hipódromo, Madrid
Referee: (Spain) Javier Prado (Athletic Bilbao)
10 April 1906

Madrid FC	4–1	Athletic Bilbao
Manuel Prast (1T); Pedro Parages (2T)	Report	Adolfo Uribe (2T)

Hipódromo, Madrid
Referee: (Scotland) William Waterson (Recreativo de Huelva)

11 April 1906

Athletic Bilbao	2–1	Recreativo de Huelva
Hermenegildo García 60'; Celada (?)	Report	William Waterson 30'

Hipódromo, Madrid
Referee: (Spain) Antonio Alonso (Madrid FC)

Teams	Played	Won	Drawn	Lost	GF	GA	Pts
Madrid FC	2	2	0	0	7	1	4
Athletic de Bilbao	2	1	0	1	3	5	2
Recreativo de Huelva	2	0	0	2	1	5	0

Copa del Rey 1906 Winners
Madrid FC
2nd Title
