= Joan Soler (footballer) =

Spanish sportsperson and author (1881–1961)

Personal information
- Full name: Joan Soler Lluch
- Birth name: Joan Soler i Lluch
- Date of birth: 23 March 1881
- Place of birth: Barcelona, Catalonia, Spain
- Date of death: 4 April 1961 (aged 80)
- Place of death: Barcelona, Catalonia, Spain
- Position: Goalkeeper

Senior career*
Years	Team	Apps	(Gls)
1909–1918	FC Barcelona		

International career
1904–1905	Catalonia	2	(0)
- * Club domestic league appearances and goals

Joan Soler Lluch (23 March 1881 – 4 April 1961) was a Spanish author and footballer who played as a goalkeeper for FC Barcelona between 1903 and 1907.

== Biography ==
Born in Barcelona on 23 March 1881, Soler began his football career in his hometown club FC Barcelona in 1903, aged 22, although he only made his official debut on 3 January 1904, in a crushing victory against San Gervasio (10–0) in the Catalan championship, and together with Arthur Witty, Miguel Morris, José Quirante, and Carles Comamala, he was a member of the Barça team that won the 1903–04 Catalan Championship. He stayed loyal to the club for four years, from 1903 to 1907, playing a total of 17 official matches for Barça, all of which in the Catalan championship. He was one of the first goalkeepers in the club's history, being known by the nickname el larg (long man), due to his height.

His brother Manuel also played for Barça from 1903 to 1906, but only in unofficial matches. However, there were not the only Solers linked to the early years of FC Barcelona, since the delivery of the trophy of the 1901–02 Copa Macaya, Barça's first-ever piece of silverware, took place at the Gran Continental restaurant, which was owned by Francisco Soler, possibly their father. In an interview from the Philippines in 1946, former player Manuel Amechazurra remembered a player from 1903 to 1904 named Soler "from the Tibidabo hotel", and in fact, Joan was also the owner of the Tibidabo restaurant years later.

As a Barça player, Soler was eligible to play for the Catalan national team, making his debut on 29 May 1904, in a friendly match against RCD Espanyol, champion of the three regional competitions of the 1903–04 season, and although Catalonia lost 1–4, the local newspaper stated that Soler "proved to be the goalkeeper of the day". On 17 January 1905, he earned his second and last cap for Catalonia against the Sportsmen's Club at Espanyol's field, the Hospital Clínic; the match finished with an unknown score.

In 1927, Soler was described as "a convinced sportsman for having practiced countless of them", and in fact, besides football, he was also an outstanding cyclist, and a tennis and Basque pelota player. He was also an expert in fishing and hunting, and an author of several books on the subject, such as La Pesca Deportiva and Didáctica Cinegética tratado de Caza Menor. He was also president of the Association of Sport Fishermen. Some historians have argued that Joan and Josep Soler, the infamous faceless president of FC Barcelona, were actually the same person, but the club's Studies Center has dismissed this hypothesis.

== Death ==
Soler died in Barcelona on 4 April 1961, at the age of 80.

== Honours ==
FC Barcelona

- Catalan championship
  - Champions (1): 1904–05

== Works ==
- La Pesca Deportiva (The Sport Fishing)
- Didáctica Cinegética tratado de Caza Menor (Didactics of Hunting Treatise on Small Game), which had 175 pages and was distributed by Casa del Libro in Barcelona.
