= Agustin Peris =

Spanish sports journalist and footballer

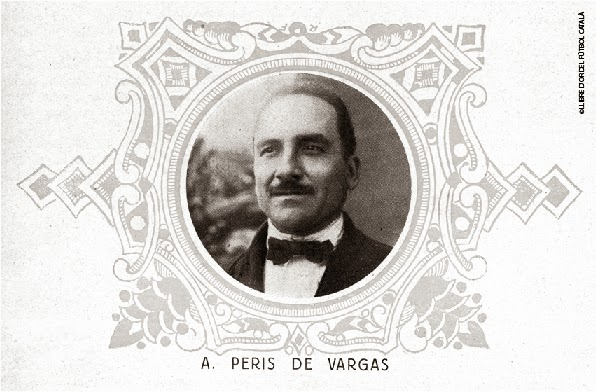
- Agustin Peris

President of Català SC
- In office 1910 – late 1920s

1st President of Catalan Baseball Federation
- In office 1929–1939
- Succeeded by: Lluís María Jordà
Association football career
- Full name: Agustin Peris de Vargas
- Birth name: Agustí Peris de Vargas
- Date of birth: 1880
- Place of birth: Manzanillo, Cuba
- Date of death: 17 August 1948 (aged 68)
- Place of death: Barcelona, Catalonia, Spain
- Position: Midfielder
Senior career*
Years	Team	Apps	(Gls)
1906–1907	FC Barcelona	1	(0)
1909–1911	Català FC	+5	(0)
1909	FC Barcelona	1	(0)
- * Club domestic league appearances and goals

Agustin Peris de Vargas (1880 – 27 August 1948) was a Spanish sports journalist and pioneer of baseball and football in Catalonia, who held managerial positions in the respective federations as a founder and the first president of the Catalan Baseball Federation (1929–1939) and the treasurer of the Catalan Football Federation.

He played both sports in his youth, participating in the very first documented baseball match held in Spain in 1901 and playing as a midfielder for FC Internacional and Sport Club Català before becoming the president of the latter. Apart from playing football and baseball, a sport he practiced until he was over fifty years old, he was also a swimmer and an athlete and worked as a journalist in several publications of his time, including the Spanish newspaper Mundo Deportivo, in which he signed the chronicles under the pseudonym "Strike".

His brothers Joaquim, Lisandro, and Enrique were also outstanding sportsmen and leaders.

== Early life ==
Peris was born in 1880 in Cuba, to a Valencian father, Joaquín Peris Serrano, a military man, and an Asturian mother. He was the second son of seven children, including three brothers, Joaquín, Lisandro and Enrique. The family returned to Spain when the Cuban War of Independence ended in 1898.

== Sporting career ==
=== Pioneering baseball ===
Peris developed a deep interest in Baseball while living in Cuba, so when he came to live in Barcelona, he brought with him his passion for the sport. He was thus one of the first practitioners of baseball in Catalonia, not only as a player, but also as a coach, umpire and manager. The four Peris de Vargas brothers were all great athletes, standing out mostly as footballers, but Agustin differs from the other brothers in that, in addition to playing football, he also pioneered baseball in Spain. On 3 February 1901, he participated in the first documented baseball match played in Spain, which was held in the old Sagrada Família field by two teams, the Antiguos and the Modernos (old and new), formed by Cuban and Spanish emigrants who had returned from the Cuban War.

=== Footballing career ===
Peris began his football career with FC Internacional in 1903. Together with Paco Bru, Charles Wallace, and his younger brother Enrique, he helped the club achieve three successive runner-up finishes in the Catalan championship between 1904 and 1906, losing out on the title to a different opponent each time, Club Español (now RCD Espanyol), FC Barcelona, and X Sporting Club respectively. In 1906, the club had to suspend its activities due to a lack of players, so most of the remaining FCI players, including his brother, joined FC Barcelona for the 1906–07 season, but Peris took a different path as he instead decided to join Barça's city rivals, Sport Club Català.

On 26 December 1909, Peris played for Barcelona in one international friendly match against the French club Olympique Cettois, featuring alongside his brother Enrique. This was his second appearance for the Blaugrana club, having already played a friendly with them in the 1906–07 season. Peris played his last season as a footballer with Català, in 1914–15, aged 35.

In 1910, Peris was elected president of SC Catalá, a position he held for nearly two decades until the club's disappearance at the end of the 1920s. Also in 1910, he took up the position of manager in the newly created Barcelona Baseball Club, and a year later he entered the board of directors of the Catalan Football Federation as treasurer, remaining as such for many years, and hence receiving the golden medal of that institution in 1930.

== Philanthropy projects ==
Despite not being a professional soldier, Peris collaborated in various kinds of military initiatives with his brother Joaquín, a military man with the rank of Colonel of Infantry. In 1921 he was part of a commission to launch an "Institute of Deformed of the War", which was intended to house those Spanish soldiers in need. He later organized a sports festival to collect funds in the field of FC Barcelona, donating them to the infantry regiment number 73 of the Battalion of the Badajoz, which had various members who belonged to various football clubs such as FC Güell, FC Barcelona, FC Martinenc, CD Europa and Sporting de Gijón, who all sent him a letter to thank him for the donations.

== Sports journalism ==
Apart from playing football and baseball, a sport he practiced until he was over fifty years old, he also worked as a sports journalist in several publications of his time, including the Spanish newspaper Mundo Deportivo, in which he signed the chronicles under the pseudonym "Strike". In 1923 he started another chapter of the long controversy about the "Deanery" of football in Barcelona, when he defended the "deanery" of his club, SC Catalá, debating that it had been founded in October, a month earlier than FC Barcelona.

In 1924, Peris was a referee in a boxing match held in the Goula Hall of Sant Feliu de Guíxols.

== Head of the Catalan Baseball Federation ==
Peris was the founder and first president of the Catalan Baseball Federation, a position he held from 27 April 1929 to 1939. The four Peris de Vargas brothers held management positions in various associations and federations. The characteristic that defined them the most, especially Agustín and Joaquín, were their authoritarian style, which would cause them more than one problem. In fact, his strong personality caused a split in the Catalan Federation in 1931 and some clubs founded the Official Baseball League, which was run in parallel with Peris's federation until the end of the Spanish Civil War, having some of the best teams. Peris left his position in 1939 and was replaced at the head of the Catalan Federation by Luis María Jordá, the first president appointed in this sport.

== Later life ==
During the Civil War, both Peris and his brother Joaquim, who was in the military, supported the Franco side. After the civil war, Peris was appointed Mayor of the Neighborhood of the "Pelayo area", belonging to District V of the city of Barcelona. The headquarters was located in his store, which was now at Calle Tallers, and where they sold gramophones.

In 1943, Peris accepted to assume the presidency of the College of Referees of the Catalan Federation.

== Death ==
Peris died in August 1948, at the age of 68. Several leaders linked to football and baseball were present at this funeral, such as FC Barcelona's president, Agustí Montal Galobart, and the president of the RCD Espanyol, Francisco Sáenz.
