= Adolfo Uribe =

Spanish footballer (1882–?)

Personal information
- Full name: Adolfo Miguel Ángel de Uribe Olano
- Date of birth: 29 September 1882
- Place of birth: Bilbao, Spain
- Place of death: Spain
- Position: Forward

Senior career*
Years	Team	Apps	(Gls)
1901–1905	Mittweidaer BC		
1905–1906	Athletic Bilbao		
1906–1907	Bizcaya		
1907–1908	Athletic Bilbao		
- * Club domestic league appearances and goals

Adolfo Miguel Ángel de Uribe Olano (29 September 1882 – after 1907) was a Spanish footballer who played as a forward for Athletic Bilbao. He is best known for scoring Bilbao's only goal in the 1906 Copa del Rey Final.

== Career ==
=== Mittweida ===
Adolfo Uribe was born in Bilbao on 29 September 1882. Between 1901 and 1905 he studied Electromechanical Engineering at the Mittweida technical school (Saxony, Germany). There he developed an interest in football and began playing with the Mittweidaer Ballspiel-Club, the school's football team, which had been founded in 1896 by students. In his years at Mittweida, he gained popularity as a football and rugby player. When he returned to Bilbao after completing his studies in 1905, he joined Athletic Bilbao, with whom he played between 1905 and 1908.

=== Athletic Bilbao ===
Uribe made his competitive debut for Athletic Bilbao on 10 April 1906, in the final of the 1906 Copa del Rey, netting a goal in a 1–4 loss to Madrid FC (now Real Madrid. In 1907, the best players from Athletic and Unión Vizcaino came together to form Bizcaya, which was specially created to take part in the 1907 Copa del Rey, but Uribe did not make the final cut, and without him, they again lost the final to Madrid FC. He stayed at the club until 1908.

== Honours ==
Athletic Bilbao

- Copa del Rey runner-up: 1906
