= Mauro Alonso =

Brazilian footballer

Personal information
- Full name: Mauro Lucas dos Santos Alonso
- Date of birth: August 12, 1988 (age 38)
- Place of birth: São Carlos, SP, Brazil
- Height: 1.80 m (5 ft 11 in)
- Position: Midfielder

Senior career*
| Years | Team | Apps | (Gls) |
| 2005–2007 | America (SP) | | |
| 2007 | Barretos | | |
| 2007–2009 | Monte Azul | | |
| 2009 | Olé Brasil | | |
| 2010 | Américo (SP) | | |
| 2010 | BATE Borisov | 3 | (0) |
| 2011 | FK Ekranas | 27 | (2) |
| 2012 | FC Brașov | 7 | (0) |
| 2013 | Al-Ittihad Tripoli | | |
| 2013 | Lyubimets 2007 | 6 | (0) |
| 2015–2016 | Famalicão | 18 | (2) |
- * Club domestic league appearances and goals as of 18 December 2016

Mauro Lucas dos Santos Alonso (born August 12, 1988), commonly known as Mauro Alonso, is a Brazilian former football midfielder.

== Career ==
Mauro Alonso began playing football for América Futebol Clube (SP). He won title with BATE Borisov in 2010 in the Belarusian Premier League.
