= Alfredo Gil (footballer) =

Spanish footballer (1891–1908)

Personal information
- Full name: Alfredo Gil Porta
- Date of birth: 10 January 1891
- Place of birth: Barcelona, Catalonia, Spain
- Date of death: 27 January 1908 (aged 17)
- Place of death: Barcelona, Catalonia, Spain
- Position: Forward

Senior career*
Years	Team	Apps	(Gls)
1905–1908	FC Barcelona	3	(0)
- * Club domestic league appearances and goals

Alfredo Gil Porta (10 January 1891 – 27 January 1908) was a Spanish footballer who played as a forward for FC Barcelona between 1905 and 1908.

== Early life ==
Gil was born on 10 January 1891 in Carrer de Sant Pau in Barcelona, the son of Josep Gil i Pradas, born in Figueroles, and Teresa Porta i Prim, born in Vila-rodona.

== Career ==
Gil joined the football team of FC Barcelona from the athletics section, where he had stood out in endurance tests, even obtaining several first prizes in races, including one on 23 August 1906, at the age of 15, he won a 2,500 meter race. Three months earlier, in May 1906, he was forced to retire from a race that he was leading after suffering from vomiting.

In total, Gil played 12 matches for FC Barcelona and scored two goals, both in May 1906, including the only goal of a 1–0 victory over X Sporting Club on 6 May, and a consolation goal in a 4–1 loss to FC Internacional two weeks later, on 20 May. However, both of them were friendly matches; officially, Gil only played three games, all of which in the Catalan championship.

== Death ==
Gil died in Barcelona on 27 January 1908, at the age of 17, due to an illness. At the time, Gil was still a player at Barça, where he almost occupied a place in the first team of the club, since he was its first substitute, distinguishing himself for his security on the left side, with his fellow forwards.
