= Luis Astorquia =

Spanish footballer (1883–1967)

Personal information
- Full name: Luis Wenceslao Astorquia Landabaso
- Date of birth: 4 October 1883
- Place of birth: Bilbao, Spain
- Date of death: 28 March 1967 (aged 83)
- Place of death: Spain
- Position: Goalkeeper

Senior career*
Years	Team	Apps	(Gls)
1904–1907	Mittweidaer BC		
1909–1911	Athletic Bilbao		
- * Club domestic league appearances and goals

Luis Wenceslao Astorquia Landabaso (4 October 1883 – 28 March 1967) was a Spanish footballer who played as a goalkeeper for Athletic Bilbao. His older brother, Juan Astorquia, was the fundamental head behind the foundation of Athletic in 1898.

== Biography ==
Born in Bilbao, Astorquia studied in England as a child, where he developed a deep interest in football. He also studied and played football in Mittweida, Germany, where he stood out as an outstanding goalkeeper. His older brother was a founding member of Athletic Bilbao in 1898, but the club was not officially established until 5 September 1901, in the infamous meeting held in the Café García, in which Luis was one of the 33 socios (co-founders) of the club.

While his brother was a member of the first great team in the history of Athletic which won the 1902 Copa de la Coronación and the 1903 Copa del Rey, Luis was a member of the second great team which won two back-to-back Copa del Rey titles in 1910, 1911. He was the starting goalkeeper in both finals, keeping a clean sheet on the former in a 1–0 win over Vasconia. In his time at Athletic, he played five competitive matches, in which he conceded two goals.

== Honours ==
Athletic Bilbao

- Copa del Rey: 1910 and 1911
