= Juli Marial =

Spanish football player and executive (1885–1963)

- Born: Juli Marial i Mundet; 3 April 1885; Barcelona, Spain
- Died: 21 May 1963 (aged 78); Barcelona, Spain
- Occupations: Auto racing; businessman
- Known for: President of FC Barcelona

6th President of FC Barcelona
- In office 1906–1908
- Preceded by: Josep Soler
- Succeeded by: Vicente Reig

6th President of the Catalan Football Federation
- In office 1908–1909
- Preceded by: Isidre Lloret
- Succeeded by: Rafael Degollada
Association football career
- Positions: Goalkeeper; midfielder
Senior career*
| Years | Team | Apps | (Gls) |
| 1901–1903 | Irish FC | | |
| 1903–1908 | Barcelona | 41 | (1) |
- * Club domestic league appearances and goals

Juli Marial Mundet (3 April 1885 – 21 May 1963) was a Spanish businessman and footballer who played as a goalkeeper and later as a midfielder for FC Barcelona. Most notably, he was the sixth president of both FC Barcelona and the Catalan Football Federation.

Under Marial's leadership, the club experienced a social and sporting crisis, and despite his enthusiasm as both a player and a president, the club lost a third of its members, with only 38 remaining by the end of his presidency.

== Early life ==
Marial was born into a wealthy Barcelona family. His father was an architect and politician Juli Marial Tey, and his mother was Caterina Mundet Farreras, both born in Barcelona, and his brother, Melcior Marial, was also a politician. Professionally, he was dedicated, like his father, to the construction sector as a contractor.

== Playing career ==
Marial began to practice football at Irish FC, featuring alongside the likes of Romà Forns. He played as its goalkeeper from the club's foundation in 1901 until its dissolution in the autumn of 1903. He was the second president of the club (replacing Carles Renter) from practically its beginnings, and as such, Marial participated in the foundation of the Catalan Football Federation in 1900. With the disappearance of Irish FC, he joined FC Barcelona at the beginning of the 1903–04 season, where he played until the end of the 1907–08 season, first as a goalkeeper and later as a midfielder, winning the 1904–05 Catalan championship.

== President of FC Barcelona ==
On 16 October 1906, while still an active player, Marial was elected as the sixth President of FC Barcelona by the members' assembly, and just like his predecessor Josep Soler, he had to steer the club through difficult times in both social and sporting terms. During these years the club experienced a social and sporting crisis, and despite his enthusiasm as both a player and a president, he was unable to resolve a situation that was getting more and more critical. At the end of his presidency, the club had lost a third of its members, dropping as low as only 38 left, the most loyal. These years the team lost a large part of its more veteran players, such as Gamper, Witty, Meyer, Ossó, Harris or Parsons, who had been the pillars of the team since its foundation. However, his period in charge of the club also coincided with a major restructuring of the team, and during his tenure, several footballers arrived at the club who went on to form the first great team of Barcelona, such as Paco Bru, Charles Wallace and Enrique Peris from FC Internacional in 1906, and the Massana brothers (Santiago and Alfredo), José Irízar and José Berdié from X Sporting Club in 1908, and a few years later, they led the club to its first Copa del Rey victory in 1910.

During his presidency, Barcelona also experienced confrontations with the Catalan Football Federation and especially with its president, Isidro Lloret, who accused Barça of benefiting from X during the Catalan championship in 1908. To put an end to the fights, Marial accepted the presidency of the Federation in October 1908, replacing Lloret, who had received strong criticism from the sports press. At the end of 1908 he left the presidency of both Barça and the Federation, being replaced by fellow goalkeeper Vicente Reig and Rafael Degollada respectively. Reig only lasted two weeks before being himself replaced by Joan Gamper, who managed to salvage Barça from bankruptcy in part thanks to the team built by Marial.

During his presidency, Marial occasionally refereed some matches, most notably in the 1906–07 Catalan championship but also a few friendly matches played by Barça.

He remained linked to FC Barcelona and in 1915 he aspired to the vice presidency in a consensus electoral candidacy headed by Gaspar Rosés, which in the end, was not chosen.

== Other sports ==
In addition to football, Marial was involved in other sports. He was a founding member of Club Natació Barcelona in 1907, being part of the first board of directors as an accountant. He was also a member of the Real Sociedad de Sport Vasco, frequently practicing the sport of Basque pelota at the Frontón Condal.

Marial was also a member of the Royal Automobile Club of Catalonia (RACC) and owner of a Hispano-Suiza. He participated in several car races, with the highlight of his automobilist career being his triumph in the second category of the Volta a Catalunya in 1917.

== Honours ==
FC Barcelona

- Catalan championship:
  - Champions: 1904–05
