= Hochschule Mittweida =

Public university of applied science in Mittweida, Germany

Coordinates: 50.9881°N 12.9709°E

Hochschule of Mittweida
- Type: Public
- Established: 1867
- President: Volker Tolkmitt
- Administrative staff: 495 (2017)
- Students: 6.616 (WS 2018/19)
- Location: Mittweida, Saxony, Germany
- Website: www.hs-mittweida.de

The Hochschule Mittweida (German: Hochschule Mittweida) is a public university of applied science located in Mittweida, Germany, founded in 1867.

== History ==
The University of Applied Sciences Mittweida is the second-largest public university of applied sciences in Saxony. It has had almost 80,000 alumni from almost 40 countries worldwide. Founded in 1867 as Technicum, the university first served the education of machine-building engineers, and it was one of the largest private schools in Germany at the turn of the century. After the takeover by the National Socialists, the Technicum lost its status as a private school, and in 1935 became the Engineering School Mittweida (Ingenieurschule Mittweida). In the 1960s, due to the success of the electrotechnical training program, the school became the Engineering College Mittweida. In 1980, it received the right to award the academic degree of doctor engineer. In 1992, after reunification, the college received a new start as a university of applied sciences.

== Notable almuni ==
- August Arnold, co-founder of ARRI, developer of the first single-lens reflex camera
- Rento Hofstede Crull, Dutch electrical pioneer who first studied at Mittweida and then at the Hannover Technische Hochschule (now Leibniz University Hannover) in the 1880s
- August Horch, founder of Audi
- Walter Bruch, inventor of the PAL color television system
- Florian Munteanu, actor
- Gerhard Neumann, developed the J-79 jet engine

== See also ==
- Education in Germany
- German universities
- Free State of Saxony
- Germany
