= Álvarez-Buylla =

Álvarez-Buylla is a Spanish surname. Notable people with the surname include:

- Adolfo A. Buylla (1850–1927), Spanish economist, politician, professor, jurist, pedagogue, and social reformer
- Plácido Álvarez-Buylla (1885–1938), Spanish footballer, diplomat, politician, and son of the above
- Vicente Álvarez-Buylla (1890–1969), Spanish footballer, diplomat, writer, and brother of the above
- Adolfo Álvarez-Buylla (1897–1945), Spanish footballer and brother of the above
- Arturo Álvarez-Buylla (born 1958), Mexican professor and researcher in neurobiology
- María Elena Álvarez-Buylla Roces (born 1959), Mexican professor and sister of the above
