= 1907–08 Madrid FC season =

6th season in existence of Real Madrid CF

Madrid FC
1907–08 season
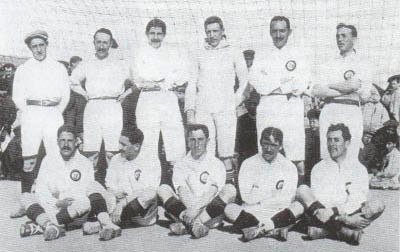
- Madrid FC team in 1907–08.
- President: Carlos Padrós
- Manager: No manager
- Stadium: No home stadium
- Madrid Regional Championship (Note: The Campeonato Regional de Madrid (Madrid Regional Championship) was a regional league used as a qualifier for the Copa del Rey.): 1st
- Copa del Rey: Winners
- Top goalscorer: League: Manuel Prast (5); All: Manuel Prast (5)
- Biggest win: Madrid FC 5–0 Español de Madrid
- Biggest defeat: Unbeaten in competitive matches
Home colours	Away colours

The 1907–08 season was Madrid Football Club's 6th season in existence. The club played some friendly matches. They also played in the Campeonato Regional de Madrid (Madrid Regional Championship) and the Copa del Rey. Madrid FC won both competitions for the fourth consecutive season becoming the first club to achieve the feat.

== Players ==
Note: Flags indicate national team as defined under FIFA eligibility rules; some limited exceptions apply. Players may hold more than one non-FIFA nationality.

No.	Pos.	Nation	Player
—	GK	ENG	Federico Lindsey Larraine
—	DF	ESP	José María Aspiunza
—	DF	ESP	José Berraondo
—	DF	URU	Edmundo Novoa
—	DF	ESP	Plácido Álvarez-Buylla
—	MF	ESP	Enrique Normand
—	MF	ESP	Cipriano Prada Amedo

No.	Pos.	Nation	Player
—	MF	ESP	Manuel Prast
—	MF	ESP	Manuel Mauricio Yarza
—	FW	FRA	Pedro Parages
—	FW	GUA	Federico Revuelto
—	FW	ESP	Antonio Neyra
—	FW	ESP	Julio Chulilla Gazol

== Friendlies ==
15 December 1907 Friendly	Madrid FC	2–2	Español de Madrid	Av. Plaza Toros, Madrid
	? ?	Report	Rodríguez	Referee: Prast

29 December 1907 Friendly	Madrid FC	4–0	Español de Madrid	Av. Plaza Toros, Madrid
		Report		Referee: Prast

6 January 1908 Friendly – reserve team	Madrid FC	3–2	Español de Madrid	Av. Plaza Toros, Madrid
		Report		Referee: Chulilla
Note: The match was played by the second teams of both clubs.

26 January 1908 Friendly	Madrid FC	0–1	Español de Madrid	Av. Plaza Toros, Madrid
		Report		Referee: Chulilla
Note: The match lasted only 20 minutes after Español withdrew in protest of the officiating.

9 February 1908 Friendly	A. Infanteria Toledo	0–7	Madrid FC	Campo de Tiro, Toledo
		Report	? ? ? ? ? Chulilla; V. Buylla	Referee: Guijosa
Note: The match by played by Madrid FC's second team.

== Competitions ==
=== Overview ===
Competition	First match	Last match	Starting round	Final position	Record							
Competition	First match	Last match	Starting round	Final position	Pld	W	D	L	GF	GA	GD	Win %
Campeonato Regional de Madrid	8 March 1908	29 March 1908	Matchday 1	Winners	6	4	1	1	18	4	+14	66.67
Copa del Rey	12 April 1908	12 April 1908	Final	Winners	1	1	0	0	2	1	+1	100.00
Total					7	5	1	1	20	5	+15	71.43

Source: Competitions

=== Campeonato Regional de Madrid ===
==== League table ====
Pos	Team	Pld	W	D	L	GF	GA	GD	Pts	Qualification
1	Madrid (C, Q)	6	4	1	1	15	4	+11	9 (Note: Madrid FC failed to appear for their first match against Athletic Club de Madrid and forfeited the match as a result.)	Qualification for the Copa del Rey
2	RS Gimnástica	6	3	2	1	14	11	+3	8	
3	Athletic Madrid	6	3	1	2	3	6	−3	7	
4	Español Madrid	6	0	0	6	2	15	−13	0 (Note: Español de Madrid retired at half time in their match against Madrid FC with the score 3–0 in the latter's favour. The club also failed to appear in their scheduled match against Athletic Club de Madrid. Español de Madrid ceded points for both matches.)	

Source: Rec.Sport.Soccer Statistics Foundation
Rules for classification: 1) points; 2) goal difference; 3) number of goals scored.
(C) Champions; (Q) Qualified for the phase indicated

==== Matches ====
8 March 1908 1	Madrid FC	4–1	RS Gimnástica	Av. Plaza Toros, Madrid
	Chulilla; Prast (?); Revuelto; Normand	Report		Attendance: Morales; Referee: Murga

15 March 1908 2	Madrid FC	v	Athletic Club de Madrid	Av. Plaza Toros, Madrid
		Report	w/o
Note: Madrid FC did not appear for the match and forfeited the result.

19 March 1908 3	Madrid FC	3–0	Athletic Club de Madrid	Av. Plaza Toros, Madrid
	Prada 40'; Prast (?)	Report		Referee: Kindelán

22 March 1908 4	Madrid FC	3–0	Español de Madrid	Av. Plaza Toros, Madrid
		Report		Referee: Romero

25 March 1908 5	Español de Madrid	0–5	Madrid FC	Av. Plaza Toros, Madrid
		Report

29 March 1908 6	Madrid FC	3–3	RS Gimnástica	Av. Plaza Toros, Madrid
	Revuelto 2'; Prast (?), 85'	Report	Morales 30'; Garrido 35'; Vittoriano (?)	Referee: Heredia

=== Copa del Rey ===
12 April 1908 Final	Madrid FC	2–1	Sporting de Vigo	Campo de O'Donnell, Madrid
	Neyra 41'; Revuelto (?)	Report	Posada 85'	Attendance: 4,000; Referee: Avalos
