= Plácido Álvarez-Buylla =

Spanish footballer

Minister of Industry and Commerce
- In office 19 February 1936 – 4 September 1936
- Preceded by: José María Álvarez Mendizábal
- Succeeded by: Anastasio de Gracia

Personal details
- Born: 5 April 1885 Oviedo, Asturias, Spain
- Died: 10 August 1938 (aged 53) Paris, France
- Height: 183 cm (6 ft 0 in)
Association football career
- Full name: Plácido Álvarez-Buylla Lozana
- Height: 1.83 m (6 ft 0 in)
- Position: Defender
Senior career*
Years	Team	Apps	(Gls)
1900–1906	Oviedo FC		
1906–1907	Madrid FC		
1907–1911	Español de Madrid		
1911	Espanyol		
- * Club domestic league appearances and goals

Plácido Álvarez-Buylla Lozana (5 April 1885 - 10 August 1938) was a Spanish footballer, diplomat and politician, who was the Minister of Industry and Commerce in 1936. He reached the highest levels both in sports and professionally. As a young man, he played football at the clubs Oviedo FC in Asturias, Madrid FC and Español de Madrid in Madrid, and Espanyol in Barcelona, reaching Copa del Rey finals with the latter three. As an older man, he had a successful political career, holding several important positions in the Spanish government, such as Minister of Industry and Commerce.

He had three brothers, Benito, Plácido and Adolfo, and the latter two also were footballers.

== Early life ==
Buylla was born in Asturias as the son of (Adolfo A. Buylla, professor of Political Economy and president of the Ateneo de Madrid, and of Carmen Lozana de la Concha. Buylla and his family used to spend the summers in Salinas, where it is known that he and his brothers played football matches with the team from the town of Castrillón.

== Football career ==
=== Oviedo and Avilés ===
Buylla began to play football in 1900, at the age of 15, when he was induced to do so by a friend who had returned from England. Buylla played for his hometown club Oviedo FC, featuring alongside the illustrious professor of history, Rafael Altamira, then a professor at the University of Oviedo. He was also part of the very first teams in Ávila, such as Círculo Industrial y de Sport de Avilés, with whom he played between 1908 and 1912.

=== Madrid FC ===
All of the Buylla brothers played for Madrid FC, with each spending three years in the capital due to their legal university studies, and due to their family having settled there. When Plácido moved to Madrid in 1906 to continue his Law studies, he soon made friends, many of whom were members of Madrid FC and overnight he found himself enrolled in the white team where he came to share captaincy of the second team. He was a tall and strong man who performed very well in defensive tasks, so even though Madrid had the likes of José Berraondo, José Quirante, and Joaquín Yarza in its back-line, his physical attributes and well-built constitution earned him a position in the first team as either a midfielder or a defender, but mostly as the latter. On one occasion, on 28 February 1905, he even played as a goalkeeper in the third team against Athletic de Madrid due to a lack of players.

His crowning moment in Madrid came on 5 January 1907 in an international match against Club Lisboa, where he played as a left center half. He obtained his doctorate at the University of Madrid in 1909.

=== Español de Madrid ===
Despite some encouraging first steps in the white club, he followed the Giralt brothers (Armando and José) and Antonio Neyra when they decided to leave Madrid in 1907 to join its city rivals Español de Madrid, with whom he reached back-to-back Copa del Rey finals (1909 and 1910) which ended in losses to Club Ciclista and FC Barcelona, losing the latter despite a brace from his younger brother Vicente.

=== Espanyol ===
In 1910, the Giralt brothers, Neyra, and his younger brother Vicente left Español to join RCD Espanyol in Barcelona, and they once again proved their quality by reaching yet another cup final in 1911, in which he started in a 3–1 loss to Athletic Bilbao. According to the Mundo Deportivo issue of 24 March 1910, the then 24-year-old Buylla was a right back of 79 kilos in weight and 1,83 meters tall, and he was described as being "without a doubt one of the best players on the [Espanyol] team".

His football career came to an end with the arrival of the First World War and the paralysis of the sport in Spain. His time as a footballer naturally served his political life since being part of a team acquires a habit of discipline that is absolutely necessary for politics.

== Diplomatic career ==
In 1914 he managed to be pensioned by the Board for the Expansion of Studies, which allowed him to expand his knowledge of Law at the universities of Berlin, Munich, and Vienna, becoming a professor at the University of Work in the Belgian town of Charleroi. He then entered diplomatic life by joining the diplomatic corps in 1916 and serving as a representative to several nations. First, he was attached to the Spanish embassy in Berlin and later headed the vice-consulates of Charleroi, Antwerp, Stuttgart, Bremen, Tangier, and Frankfurt. In 1924 he was awarded the Order of St. Gregory the Great by the Vatican.

With the arrival of the Second Spanish Republic in 1931, he was appointed special commissioner and chargé d'affaires in Paris, and then returned to Tangier before making the leap to Geneva. In October 1933 he was appointed general director of the Spanish protectorate in Morocco and in 1934 undersecretary of the Presidency of the Government of Alejandro Lerroux. After a brief stay at the Lisbon consulate, on 19 February 1936, he was appointed Minister of Industry and Commerce in the governments of Manuel Azaña, Santiago Casares Quiroga, Diego Martínez Barrio, and José Giral. When the Popular Front won the February 1936 elections, he was appointed the Minister of Industry and Commerce, a position he held for a few months until 4 September of the same year when the first government of Francisco Largo Caballero was formed.

During the Spanish Civil War, Buylla was appointed consul general of the Republic in Dublin and then Gibraltar, a position he held until 20 February 1938 when he became the consul of France, where he died in Paris in 1938.

== Honours ==
=== Club ===
Madrid FC

- Centro Championship:
  - Champions (1): 1906–07
- Copa del Rey:
  - Champions (1): 1907

Español de Madrid

- Copa del Rey:
  - Runner-up (2): 1909 and 1910

RCD Espanyol

- Copa del Rey:
  - Runner-up (1): 1911

== See also ==
- List of Real Madrid CF players
