= Bonifacio Echeverría =

Spanish footballer

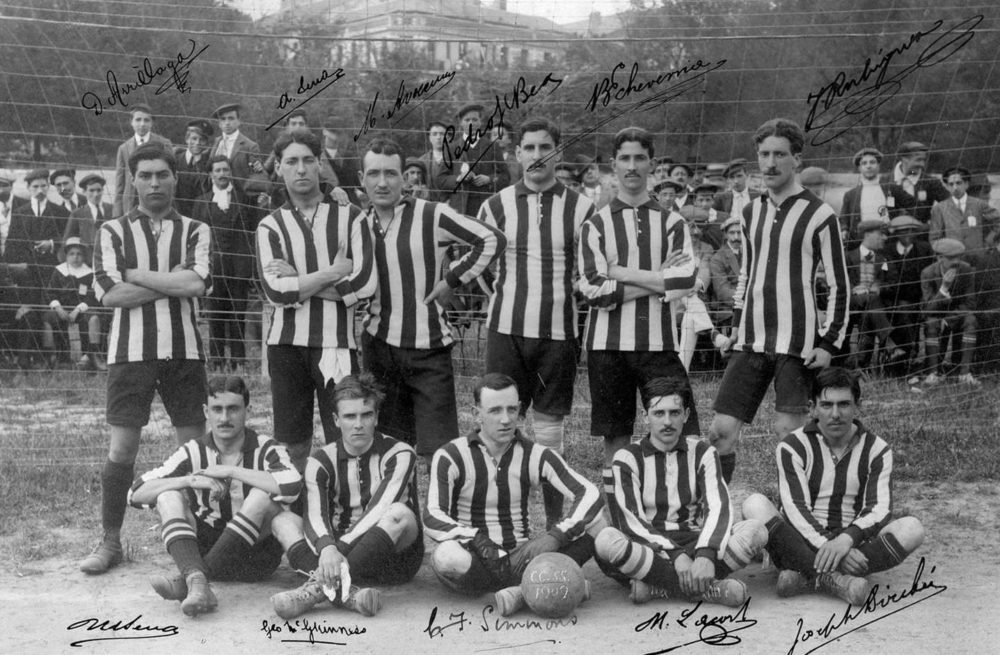
- Echeverría (standing, second from right) in 1909

Personal information
- Full name: Bonifacio Echeverria Esponda
- Date of birth: 4 October 1886
- Place of birth: Ayacucho, Buenos Aires, Argentina
- Position: Defender

Senior career*
Years	Team	Apps	(Gls)
1905–1908	San Sebastián RC		
1908–1909	Stade Bordelais		
1909	Club Ciclista		
1909–1910	Vasconia SC		
1910–1913	Real Sociedad		

International career
1913	Spain (unofficial)	1	(0)
- * Club domestic league appearances and goals

Bonifacio Echeverria Esponda (4 October 1886 – unknown) was a Spanish footballer who played as a defender for Club Ciclista and Real Sociedad in the early 20th century.

== Early life ==
Bonifacio Echeverria was born on 4 October 1886 in Ayacucho, Buenos Aires, Argentina, as the son of a Spanish Basque father from San Sebastián and a French Basque mother from Saint-Jean-Pied-de-Port, Lower Navarre.

== Club career ==
=== Early career ===
Echeverria arrived in Spain in 1903, first in Barcelona, then in San Sebastián, where he played for the San Sebastián Recreation Club, and was then one of the founders of San Sebastián FC in 1908.

A few weeks later, he moved to Bordeaux to complete his studies, and while there, he played for Stade Bordelais. On 24 January 1909, he started for Bordelais in a friendly match against his former club, San Sebastián, which ended in a 5–2 loss.

=== Club Ciclista ===
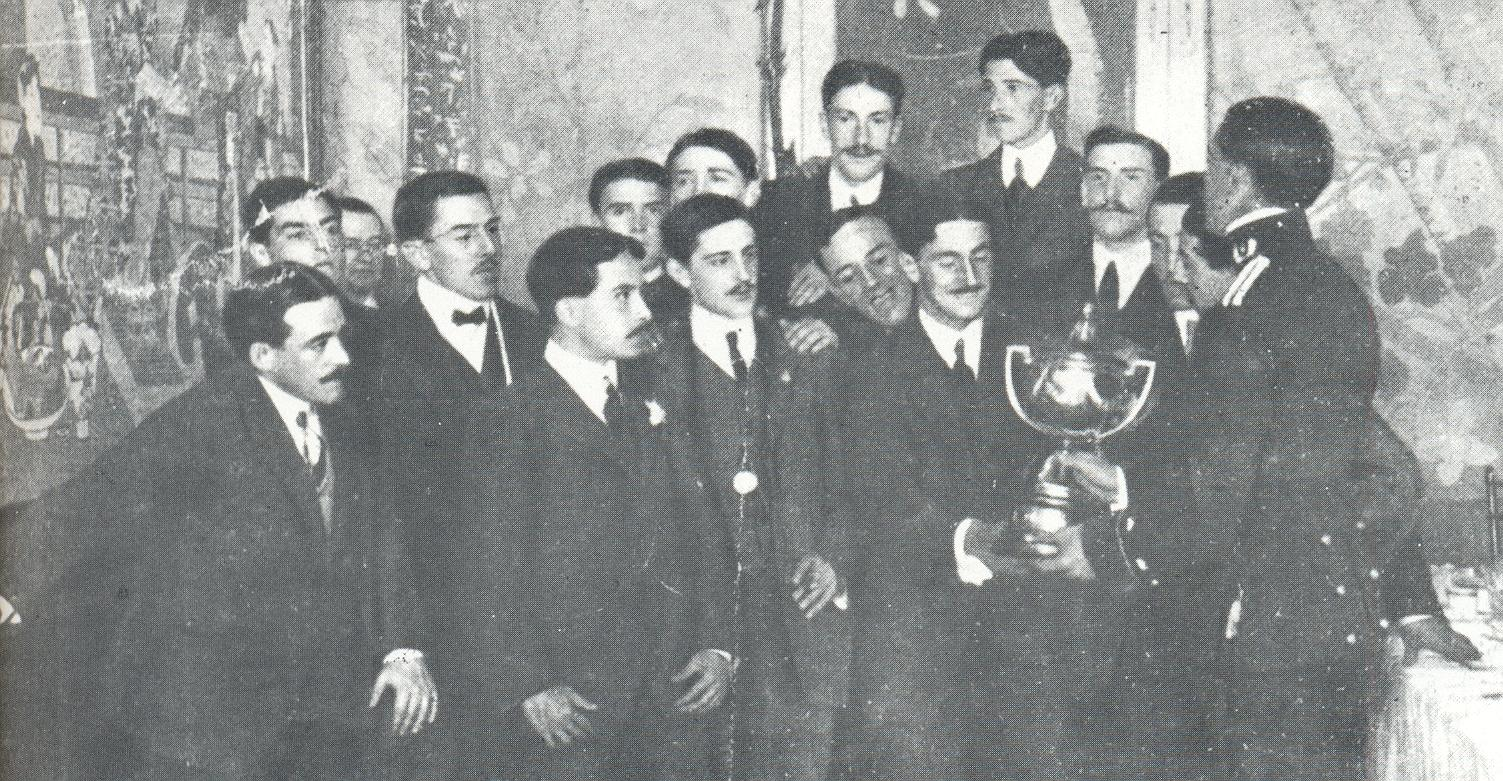
Players from Club Ciclista celebrating with the 1909 Copa del Rey trophy.

Echeverria returned to San Sebastián in time to participate in the 1909 Copa del Rey, this team under the umbrella of another local club, Club Ciclista de San Sebastián, and together with the Sena brothers (Alfonso and Miguel), Charles Simmons, and George McGuinness, he was a member of the Club Ciclista team that won the tournament, beating Español de Madrid 3–1 in the final. In total, he played seven matches for Club Ciclista, winning five of them.

=== Real Sociedad ===
A few months after this victory, the players who had won the tournament together with José Berraondo founded the Sociedad de Football (now known as Real Sociedad) on 7 September 1909, definitively disassociating themselves from the Cycling Club. Sociedad participated in the 1910 Copa del Rey (UECF) using, again, the umbrella of another local club, the Vasconia Sporting Club, and this group proved their worth again by reaching the final (UECF), which they lost 0–1 to Athletic, courtesy of a goal from Remigio Iza. Also in 1910, Real Sociedad participated in the inaugural edition of the Pyrenees Cup, helping his side reach the final, which ended in a 1–2 loss to FC Barcelona.

Echeverría played his last Copa del Rey match in 1911; afterwards, he only played in the regional championship. He remained loyal to Sociedad until his retirement in 1913, aged 26. In total, he played 15 official matches for Sociedad between 1909 and 1913, winning 10, drawing three, and losing two.

Since his family did not allow him to be a footballer, he played many games under false names, such as "Casanova", which was a free translation of his surname (Etxeberria means "The new house" in Basque).

== International career ==
On 25 May 1913, the 27-year-old Echeverría went down in history as one of the eleven footballers who played in the very first unofficial game of the Spain national team at Estadio de Amute in Hondarribia. He was called up as an emergency solution, following the absence of Santiago Massana and the subsequent injury of his substitute, Estomba. The Spanish team faced a French national side represented by the USFSA, and it was Arzuaga (playing as a forward on the day) who netted an 85th-minute equalizer to salvage a 1–1 draw.

== Honours ==
Club Ciclista

- Copa del Rey: 1909

Vasconia SC

- Copa del Rey: Runner-up 1910 (Note: as Vasconia.)
