= Joaquín Yarza =

Spanish footballer

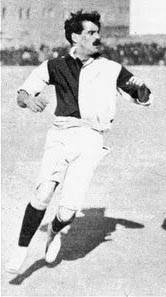
- Quincho Yarza in the 1908 Copa del Rey Final

Personal information
- Full name: Joaquín Yarza Ormazábal
- Date of birth: 1881
- Place of birth: Vigo, Pontevedra, Spain
- Date of death: 1972 (aged 90–91)
- Position: Midfielder

Senior career*
| Years | Team | Apps | (Gls) |
| 1902–1904 | Moderno FC | | |
| 1904–1907 | Madrid FC | 10 | |
| 1907–1909 | Sporting de Vigo | 1 | |
| 1909 | Galicia FC | | |
| 1909 | Pontevedra Sporting | | |
| 1909–1911 | Real Club Coruña | | |
| 1912–1914 | Deportivo de La Coruña | | |
- * Club domestic league appearances and goals

Joaquín Yarza Ormazábal, also known as Quincho Yarza (1881–1972), was a Spanish footballer who played as a midfielder for Madrid FC. Along with his brother Manuel, he was a member of the Madrid FC side that won the Copa del Rey four times in a row, between 1905 and 1908, although Joaquín only participated in the first three, leaving the club in 1907 to join Sporting de Vigo. Quincho helped Sporting reach their first-ever final in 1908, in which the Yarza brothers were rivals, as Manuel stayed at Madrid. Quincho was a versatile footballer, playing in defense, midfield and attack.

Outside of football, he served in the Spanish Navy, reaching the rank of captain, and dedicated himself to the naval industry in Vigo, creating, among other companies, the shipyard Construcciones Navales Yarza.

== Club career ==
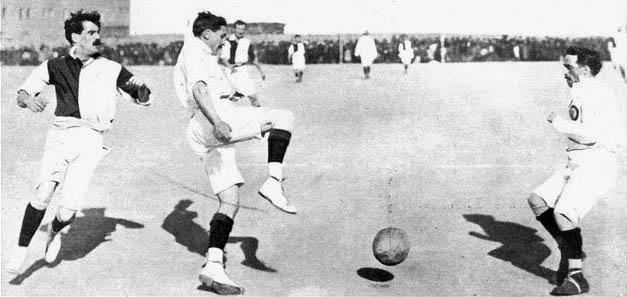
Joaquin (left) and Manuel (middle) in the 1908 Copa del Rey Final

Born in Vigo as the son of an innovator of the naval industrial sector José Joaquín Yarza Albea, a native of Donostia, he began his career at Moderno FC during the 1902–03 season, but just a few months later the club folded due to financial reasons, and the club had to merge with Madrid FC (the merger of the entities briefly known as Madrid-Moderno FC), thus he and his brother joined the first team of Madrid, for which Quincho played until 1907. He played a pivotal role in helping the club win three Copa del Rey titles in a row between 1905 and 1907. He then left Madrid to join Sporting de Vigo, with whom he reached his fourth Copa del Rey final in a row, where he came face-to-face with Madrid and his brother, who took the better of him to assure the fourth title in a row to the capital side.

During his time at Vigo he might have been the first professional footballer in Spain, during the so-called amateur era, when he received payments from the Vigo club, and in some chronicles of his time he was referred to as "professional".

He left Sporting de Vigo in 1909 and participated in the 1909 Copa del Rey with Galicia FC, being eliminated in the semi-finals by the eventual champions Club Ciclista de San Sebastián. After a brief spell with Pontevedra Sporting, he moved to Real Club Coruña still in 1909, forming an attacking partnership with Joaquín Caruncho. In 1912 he joined Deportivo de La Coruña, making his debut on 31 March in a match held in the old Riazor field against Compostela FC.

== Retirement ==
Outside of football, he joined the Spanish Navy and was a naval engineer, being assigned to several ships such as Bonifaz, Almirante Cervera or Laya. Already as a captain, he was a teacher at the Machinist Academy, and in 1935 he entered the School of Machinists in Ferrol to specialize in engines. During the Spanish Civil War he was exiled, and after the end of the conflict, he was assigned to the cruise ship Galicia.

In 1941 he settled permanently in Vigo, dying in 1972.

== Honours ==
=== Club ===
Madrid FC

- Campeonato Regional Centro:
  - Champions (3): 1904–05, 1905–06 and 1906–07
- Copa del Rey:
  - Champions (3): 1905, 1906 and 1907

Sporting de Vigo

  - Runner-up (1): 1908
