= 1910 FECF Copa del Rey final =

Copa del Rey 1910 final (FECF)
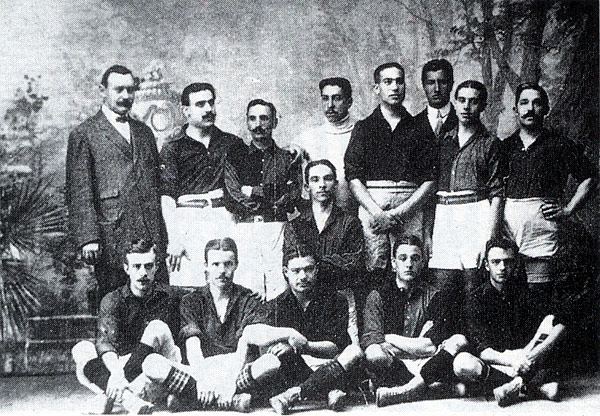
- The FC Barcelona team that won the club's first title
- Event: 1910 Copa del Rey
Barcelona	Español de Madrid
3	2
- Date: 26 May 1910
- Venue: Tiro del Pichón, Madrid
- Referee: (Spain) Manuel Lemmel

The 1910 Copa del Rey final (FECF) was the 9th final of the Spanish cup competition, the Copa del Rey (although technically there was no final, with the tournament being played as a mini-group of three teams). It was one of two rival Cup competitions played in that year due to disagreements between the reigning champion of the tournament, Club Ciclista de San Sebastián, and some of the clubs invited.

The final was played at Tiro del Pichón in Madrid on 26 May 1910. The match was contested by FC Barcelona and Español de Madrid. The latter netted twice in the opening 15 minutes thanks to a brace from Vicente Buylla, thus leading the match 0–2 down at the break, but Barça fought back and scored three goals in the second half to complete a great emotional comeback, thus lifting the trophy for the first time with a 3–2 victory. The Barça goals were scored by Charles Wallace, Carles Comamala and Pepe Rodríguez, who netted the winner in the last-minute.

This was the "official" competition, organised by the newly created FECF (Federación Española de Clubs de Football), forerunner of the Royal Spanish Football Federation (Spanish: Real Federación Española de Fútbol, RFEF), in Madrid. Both its winner, and that of the rival UECF (Unión Española de Clubes de Football) in San Sebastián played two months earlier, are currently recognised as official by the RFEF.

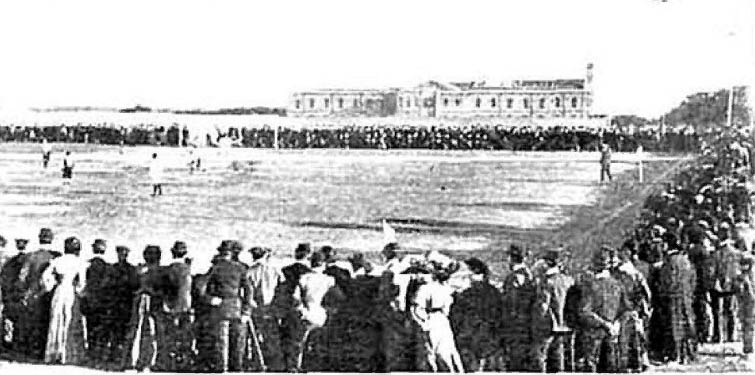
Tiro del Pichón in Madrid, venue of the match

== Match details ==
26 May 1910

Barcelona	3–2	Español de Madrid
Wallace 58'; Comamala 70'; Pepe Rodríguez 89'	Report1; Report2	Buylla 5', 12'

Tiro del Pichón, Madrid
Referee: (Spain) Manuel Lemmel

Barcelona
Español

GK	(Spain) Romá Solá
DF	(Spain) Francisco Bru
DF	(Philippines) Manuel Amechazurra
MF	(Spain) Arsenio Comamala
MF	(Spain) Enrique Peris
MF	(Spain) Joan Grau
FW	(Spain) Romà Forns
FW	(Spain) Pepe Rodríguez
FW	(Spain) Carles Comamala
FW	(England) Charles Wallace (c)
FW	(England) Percival Wallace

GK	(Spain) Antonio García
DF	(Spain) José Àlvarez
DF	(Spain) Salvador Navarro
MF	(Spain) Armando Giralt
MF	(Spain) Luis Heredia
MF	(Spain) Manuel Yarza
FW	(Spain) Gregorio Alonso
FW	(Spain) Vicente Buylla
FW	(Spain) Antonio Neyra
FW	(Spain) Antonio Morales
FW	(Spain) José Giralt

== See also ==
- 1910 UECF Copa del Rey Final
- 1913 FECF Copa del Rey final
