= Adolfo Buylla =

Adolfo Buylla may refer to:

- Adolfo A. Buylla (1850–1927), Spanish economist
- Adolfo Álvarez-Buylla (1897–1945), Spanish footballer
