= Yasmín Ríos-Solís =

Mexican operations researcher

Yasmín Águeda Ríos-Solís is a Mexican computer scientist and operations researcher who studies problems of scheduling, timetabling, and synchronization of public transport. She is a professor and researcher in the School of Engineering and Sciences at the Monterrey Institute of Technology and Higher Education.

== Education and career ==
Ríos-Solís studied applied mathematics at the Instituto Tecnológico Autónomo de México, graduating in 2002. Next, she went to Pierre and Marie Curie University in France for graduate study in computer science and operations research, funded by the Consejo Nacional de Ciencia y Tecnología (Mexico). She earned a master's degree in 2003 and completed her PhD there in 2007. Her doctoral dissertation, Earliness and Tardiness Parallel Machine Scheduling, was jointly supervised by Francis Sourd and Philippe Chrétienne.

After postdoctoral research in bioinformatics at Bielefeld University in Germany, she returned to Mexico in 2008 as an assistant professor at the Autonomous University of Nuevo León, in the Graduate Program in Systems Engineering. There, she was promoted to associate professor in 2011. She moved to her present position at the Monterrey Institute of Technology and Higher Education in 2020.

== Recognition ==
Ríos-Solís was elected to the Mexican Academy of Sciences in 2020.
