= Gregorio Sena =

Spanish footballer (1890–1956)

Personal information
- Full name: Gregorio Sena Manterola
- Date of birth: 8 September 1890
- Place of birth: San Sebastián, Gipuzkoa, Spain
- Date of death: 22 May 1956 (aged 65)
- Place of death: Spain
- Position: Midfielder

Senior career*
Years	Team	Apps	(Gls)
1907	London Club		
1908–1909	VGA Médoc		
1909–1910	Unión Vizcaino		
1910–1912	Real Sociedad		
1912–1913	Espanyol		
1913–1919	Real Sociedad		
1919–1920	Athletic Bilbao		

International career
1912	Catalonia	1	(0)
- * Club domestic league appearances and goals

Gregorio Sena Manterola (8 September 1890 – 22 May 1956) was a Spanish footballer who played as a midfielder for Real Sociedad and Athletic Bilbao. His brothers Alfonso and Miguel also played for Real Sociedad. He also played one match for the Catalan national team.

== Early life and education ==
Born in San Sebastián on 8 September 1890, Sena developed a deep interest in football during his stay in England, where he made his debut with the London Club in 1907, in the second division championship in London. He quickly stood out from the rest, so much so that on one occasion, a distinguished lady from the English aristocracy threw him a bracelet made of gold and diamond, which Gregorio kept for the rest of his life.

== Club career ==
In 1908, Sena returned to Continental Europe, specifically to France, where he played for the newly-established Vie au Grand Air du Médoc. The following year, in 1909, he returned to his hometown, where he briefly played for Real Sociedad, then known as Vasconia de San Sebastián, under whose name they reached the 1910 UECF Copa del Rey final, which they lost 1–0 to Athletic Bilbao. During the early 1910s, he played with Real Sociedad, where he played alongside his brothers Miguel and Alfonso. He stayed there until 1912, when his studies forced him to move to Barcelona, where he soon joined the ranks of Espanyol, making his debut with the first team in December 1912, in a friendly match against Real Club de Polo de Barcelona. In his first (and only) season at Espanyol, he only played six official matches, five in the Catalan championship and one in the Copa del Rey.

In 1913, Sena returned to Sociedad, where he played for six years, until 1919, scoring a total of 3 goals in 20 matches, which ended in ten victories, seven losses, and three draws. One of his goals came in the form of a 6th-minute strike against Real Unión in the Biscay Championship in November 1915; the match ended in a 1–1 draw. Sena spent most of the 1918–19 season in Barcelona, playing only one official match for Sociedad, the first leg of the 1919 Copa del Rey quarter-finals against FC Barcelona at Les Corts.

In 1919, Sena was signed by Athletic Bilbao, making his competitive debut on 10 December 1919 in a 1–1 draw with Erandio. Together with Domingo Acedo, Pichichi and José María Belauste, Sena played a crucial role in helping Athletic win the 1919–20 Biscay Championship, and then reach the final of the 1920 Copa del Rey, which ended in a 2–0 loss to Barça.

== International career ==
On 1 December 1912, Sena earned his first (and only) cap for the Catalan national team, in a friendly match against France (UIAFA), helping his side to a 1–0 victory.

== Honours ==
Real Sociedad

- Copa del Rey runner-up: 1910

Athletic Club

- Biscay Championship: 1919–20
- Copa del Rey runner-up: 1920
