= Oscar Gonzalez-Perez =

Mexican neuroscientist

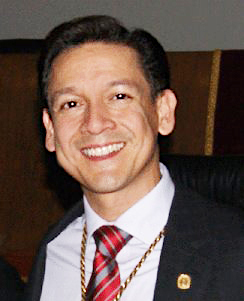
Oscar Gonzalez-Perez.

Oscar Gonzalez-Perez is professor of neuroscience in the School of Psychology at the University of Colima, Mexico. He has been honorary professor of neuroscience in the Doctorado en Ciencias Biomedicas at the University of Guadalajara and invited professor of neuroscience and cellular medicine in the Brain Tumor Stem Cell Laboratory of Alfredo Quiñones-Hinojosa at Johns Hopkins University School of Medicine. He is the leader of a scientific network named Neuro-biopsychology Basic and Applied.

== Education ==
Gonzalez-Perez received his medical degree from then Medicine School at the University of Colima and then obtained Master’s and Doctoral degrees in physiology in the Centro de Investigaciones Biomedicas at that university. He then completed a postdoctoral fellowship in developmental and stem cell biology in the laboratory of Arturo Alvarez-Buylla at University of California, San Francisco.

== Research field ==
He focuses on the study of the oligodendrocyte generation in the subventricular zona, as well as in the role of adult neural stem cells in regenerative processes to repair damaged brain tissue. Gonzalez-Perez conducts numerous research efforts on elucidating the role of stem cells in the origin of brain tumors and the potential role stem cells can play in fighting brain cancer and regaining neurological function in the Neurosurgery Brain Tumor Stem Cell Lab at the Johns Hopkins University.

== Publications ==
As of April 2017, his works have been cited more than 3100 times according to Google Scholar. Additionally, Gonzalez has published three books: Astrocytes: Structure, Functions and Role in Disease, Neuro-Immune Interactions in the Adult Central Nervous System, and The ventricular-subventricular zone: a source of oligodendrocytes in the adult brain.

== Recognition ==
He has received the Outstanding Achievement in Rheumatology Research from the American College of Rheumatology and the Prize "Pedro Sarquis Merrewe" in neuro-degenerative disorders research. He is a member of the Academia Nacional de Medicina de Mexico (Mexican National Academy of Medicine), the Mexican Academy of Sciences (Academia Mexicana de Ciencias), and the Sistema Nacional de Investigadores (National System of Mexican Researchers). Gonzalez-Perez has received a number of prizes and recognitions, which include the Premio Colima 2016, the "Maximiliano Ruiz Castaneda" prize, "Everardo Ruiz Landa" Prize, a recognition from the LVII Legislatura del Estado de Jalisco (Jalisco State Congress), the Jalisco State Award from the Consejo Estatal de Ciencia y Tecnologia del Estado de Jalisco (COECYTJAL), two Prizes "Peña Colorada", and some others.
