= José María de Aspiunza =

Spanish footballer

Personal information
- Full name: José María Aspiunza y García
- Date of birth: 1889
- Place of birth: Oviedo, Asturias, Spain
- Place of death: Spain
- Position: Defender

Youth career
- 1905–1907: Real Madrid

Senior career*
Years	Team	Apps	(Gls)
1907–1909	Real Madrid		
1910	Stadium Club Avilesino		
- * Club domestic league appearances and goals

José María Aspiunza y García was a Spanish footballer who played as a defender for Real Madrid, with whom he won the 1908 Copa del Rey, thus becoming the first Asturian to do so.

== Early life and education ==
José María de Aspiunza was born in 1889 in Oviedo, Asturias, (Note: Some sources wrongly state that he was born in Madrid.) as the son of José de Aspiunza y Urrutia, a native of Álava whose professional reasons led him to live in Oviedo for a few years, where he met Juliana García Sancho, a young woman from Avilés, whom he married. Both his father, José, and his grandfather, Juan de Aspiunza, were renowned architects, while his mother's family owned a famous hotel in the town of Salinas, which soon became their preferred destination for holidays, with the young José even playing a few matches during the summer season for Stadium Club Avilesino. Aspiunza was barely two years old when his family settled in Madrid, the city where he would live for the rest of his life, and where he married María Josefa Sánchez Lozano, with whom he had two children.

Aspiunza attended the Instituto Cardenal Cisneros in Madrid between 1899 and 1908; in his last year there, in 1907–08, he canceled his enrollment in the German course.

== Playing career ==
Aspiunza began his football career in the youth ranks of Real Madrid, eventually reaching its reserve team. He was registered as a Real Madrid player during the 1907–08 season, making his debut for the first team on 15 December, in a friendly match against Español de Madrid, which ended in a 2–2 draw. He had to wait three months to make his official debut for Madrid on 8 March 1908, which came on matchday 1 of the Centro Regional Championship, helping his side to a 4–1 win over Sociedad Gimnástica. He played in a further two regional matches as Madrid won the 1907–08 title, thus qualifying for the 1908 Copa del Rey, which turned out to be a single match between the Merengue club and Vigo Sporting, with Aspiunza starting in the final as a midfielder, from where he helped his side to a 2–1 victory. In doing so, he became the first-ever Asturian footballer to win the Copa del Rey. In total, he played six official matches for Madrid.

== Later life ==
In November 1917, his father, José, died in Madrid.

== Honours ==
Real Madrid

- Centro Championship:
  - Champions (1): 1907–08
- Copa del Rey:
  - Champions (1): 1908

== See also ==
- List of Real Madrid CF players
