= Alfonso Sena =

Spanish footballer (1886–1958)

Personal information
- Full name: Alfonso Sena Manterola
- Date of birth: 5 October 1886
- Place of birth: San Sebastián, Gipuzkoa, Spain
- Date of death: 6 August 1958 (aged 71)
- Place of death: Spain
- Position: Defender

Senior career*
| Years | Team | Apps | (Gls) |
| 1904–1906 | San Sebastián RC | | |
| 1906–1907 | Bizcaya | | |
| 1907 | San Sebastián RC | | |
| 1908–1909 | Club Ciclista | | |
| 1909–1910 | Vasconia | | |
| 1910–1914 | Real Sociedad | | |
- * Club domestic league appearances and goals

Alfonso Sena Manterola (5 October 1886 - 6 August 1958) was a Spanish footballer who played as a defender for Real Sociedad. He is one of the most important figures in the amateur beginnings of Real Sociedad from San Sebastián, having been the fundamental head behind the foundation of its predecessors, Club Ciclista in 1908, and of Real Sociedad itself in 1909. His brothers, Miguel and Gregorio, also played for Real Sociedad.

== Biography ==
Born in San Sebastián, he began his career in 1904, aged just 18, at his hometown club San Sebastián Recreation Club, which had just been founded to become the very first football club in San Sebastián. Together with Juan Arzuaga, he was part of the Recreation side that played in the 1905 Copa del Rey.

In 1906, he left Recreation Club to join his older brother at Unión Vizcaino, and in that same year, the best players from Vizcaino and Athletic Club came together to form Bizcaya, which was specially created to take part in the 1907 Copa del Rey, and the Sena brothers were elected into the team, where Alfonso formed a defensive partnership with his former Recreation Club teammate, Juan Arzuaga of Athletic. On 24 March 1907, he made his competitive debut for Athletic (Athletic Bilbao counts the matches played by Bizcaya as its own) at the 1907 Copa del Rey, in a 3–2 win over Madrid CF, and Sena faced them again in the final, but this time they lost 0–1, courtesy of a late goal from Manuel Prast. After the Bizcaya team was discontinued, Alfonso returned to the Recreation Club.

At the end of 1907, a conflict between the club's members caused the team to split with several players (including the Sena brothers, Domingo Arrillaga and Bonifacio Echeverría) leaving the club to create a new team in 1908, the San Sebastian Football Club. To participate in the 1909 Copa del Rey, this team had to play under the umbrella of another local club, Club Ciclista de San Sebastián, under whose name they presented themselves in the tournament, and against all odds, Club Ciclista won after beating Español de Madrid 3–1 in the final, in which Alfonso featured alongside his brother, Miguel.

A few months after this victory, the players who had won the tournament together with José Berraondo founded the Sociedad de Football (now known as Real Sociedad) on 7 September 1909, definitively disassociating themselves from the Cycling Club. Sociedad participated in the 1910 Copa del Rey (UECF) using, again, the umbrella of another local club, the Vasconia Sporting Club, and this group proved their worth again by reaching the final (UECF), which they lost 0–1 to Athletic. In 1913, in another edition marked by two parallel tournaments, Sociedad also played in one of the two Cup finals, this time against FC Barcelona, who needed three games to beat them. He remained loyal to Sociedad until his retirement in the mid-1910s.

== Honours ==
Club Bizcaya

- Copa del Rey: Runner-up 1907

Club Ciclista

- Copa del Rey: 1909

Real Sociedad

- Copa del Rey: Runner-up 1910, (Note: as Vasconia.) 1913
