= Edmundo Novoa =

Spanish diplomat and footballer

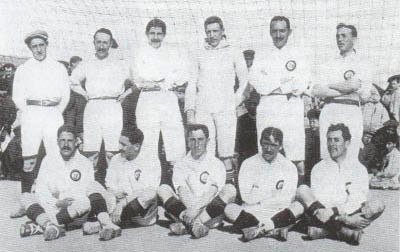
- Novoa (seated, second from left) in 1908

Personal information
- Full name: Edmundo Basilio Novoa de María
- Date of birth: 14 June 1887
- Place of birth: Durazno, Uruguay
- Date of death: 6 July 1981 (aged 94)
- Place of death: Montevideo, Uruguay
- Position: Defender

Senior career*
Years	Team	Apps	(Gls)
1905–1908	Pontevedra Athletic Club		
1908	Real Madrid	1	
1908–1910	Galicia FC		
1910	Nacional	9	(2)
1910–1912	Bristol FC		

International career
1911	Uruguay	1	(0)
- * Club domestic league appearances and goals

Edmundo Basilio Novoa de María (14 June 1887 – 6 July 1981) was a Uruguayan-born Spanish diplomat and footballer who played as a defender for Real Madrid in Spain and Nacional in Uruguay. In 1911, he played one match as a midfielder for the Uruguayan national team. He later worked as a consular agent of Uruguay in Spain, using this position to save thousands of people from Franco's repression.

== Early life ==
Edmundo Novoa was born on 14 June 1887 in Durazno, Uruguay, as the son of Edmundo Nóvoa Couto and Justina de María, both from Pontevedra. He spent most of his youth frequently traveling back and forth between Galicia and his homeland until he eventually settled in Salcedo.

== Playing career ==
=== Pontevedra AC ===
In his youth, Novoa was a fan of several sports such as sailing, fencing, and shooting, and football, being one of the most notable promoters of the latter in the city. In 1905, he was a co-founder of Pontevedra Athletic Club, which was the very first club that played football in the city of Pontevedra. In the following year, a local newspaper described him as an "excellent" player with "an elegant style" who demonstrated "his skill and mastery in the game of football, with even the English spectators praised him "as one of the best players". This team played several friendly matches against nearby teams, such as Fortuna FC, Vigo FC, but also against some teams farther away, such as Marín and Vilagarcía de Arousa, and even some competitive matches; for instance, in 1907, Novoa helped Pontevedra claim the Copa Compostelana with a 2–0 win over Vigo FC.

=== Madrid FC ===
Following an invitation from Madrid FC, Novoa and his teammate Cipriano Prada went to the capital to reinforce them in the upcoming 1908 Copa del Rey in April, but they arrived there a month earlier, in March, when the Merengue club was still competing in the Madrid regional championship. Novoa made his debut for Madrid on 19 March, helping his side to a 3–0 victory over Atlético Madrid; there are no records about the next two championship matches, both against Español de Madrid, but it is likely that Novoa started in both as Madrid won the title and thus qualified for the Copa del Rey. On 12 April, both he and Prada started in the 1908 Copa del Rey final against Vigo FC, helping their side to a 2–1 victory. In the final, he formed a defensive partnership with the club's captain José Berraondo, with the local newspaper stating that Vigo's play was "easily counteracted by Berraondo and Novoa's defense". In total, Novoa only played two known matches for Madrid.

=== Galicia FC ===
Novoa competed in the Copa del Rey the following year with Galicia FC but was knocked out in the semifinals by the subsequent champions Club Ciclista. Earlier in February 1909, he was a member of an early version of a Spain national team in a match with players from northern Spain (particularly Irún, Fortuna, and Pontevedra) that faced a team of players from southern France at the Pont Jumeaux stadium in Toulouse.

=== National ===
In 1910, Novoa took advantage of one of his many trips to Uruguay, where his father lived, to join the ranks of Club Nacional, with whom he played for four months, scoring a total of two goals in nine matches, including in the Uruguayan Championship, the Copa de Honor, and Copa Artigas. On one occasion, he briefly switched to goalkeeper when a violent shot fractured his little finger, resulting in amputation.

His performances at Nacional, and later at Bristol FC, did not go unnoticed by technical staff of the Uruguay national team, who selected him for an Argentine Copa de Honor match against Argentina in Buenos Aires; he started with Ángel Romano and José Piendibene in the 2–0 loss.

=== Later career ===
It was around this time that Manchester United showed interest in signing him, but he declined because he did not want to live in England. By the mid-1910s, he gradually stepped away from football, only occasionally playing in friendly or tribute matches.

== Diplomatic career ==
After retiring from football, Novoa would own one of Pontevedra's largest poultry farms, Las Galerías, producing eggs and breeding stock. He abandoned this career in 1925, when he was appointed consul of Uruguay in Vilagarcía de Arousa. He also served briefly as a consul general of Argentina, following the death of the local representative.

When the fascists took Galicia at the start of the Spanish Civil War, many Uruguayans and Argentines fled the area, so despite being a consul general, Novoa began to use his diplomatic status for humanitarian actions. His residence and travel documents protected thousands of Argentines, Uruguayans, and Spanish opponents threatened by Franco's regime. His diplomatically protected vehicle ferried people across the Portuguese border and documents he arranged took others by ship to the USA.

The Franco regime would revoke his diplomatic exequatur and the risks to himself or his family being arrested or killed motivated their removal to Porto, where he continued his aid to the persecuted. In 1943, in Montevideo, he was the subject of a tribute held by many of the Uruguayans and Argentines he aided in leaving Spain. He would after leaving Spain act as a counsel general in Porto, and later a Uruguayan counsel general in Philadelphia.

== Personal life ==
In September 1914, Novoa married Mercedes García Solis, daughter of Aquilino García Estévez, the Mayor of Pontevedra, and the couple would have eight children, most of them born in Galicia; one the painter and sculptor Leopoldo Nóvoa. His grandson, Joseph Novoa, is a Venezuelan-Uruguayan film director whose 1994 film "Sicario" was a finalist at the Goya Award for Best Spanish Language Foreign Film 1995.

== Later life and death ==
Novoa also loved hunting, achieving an Ibero-American Shooting Championship in 1968 in Mexico. He died in Madrid on 6 July 1981, at the age of 94.

== Honours ==
Madrid FC

- Centro Championship:
  - Champions (1): 1907–08
- Copa del Rey:
  - Champions (1): 1908

== See also ==
- List of Real Madrid CF players
