= 1909 Copa del Rey final =

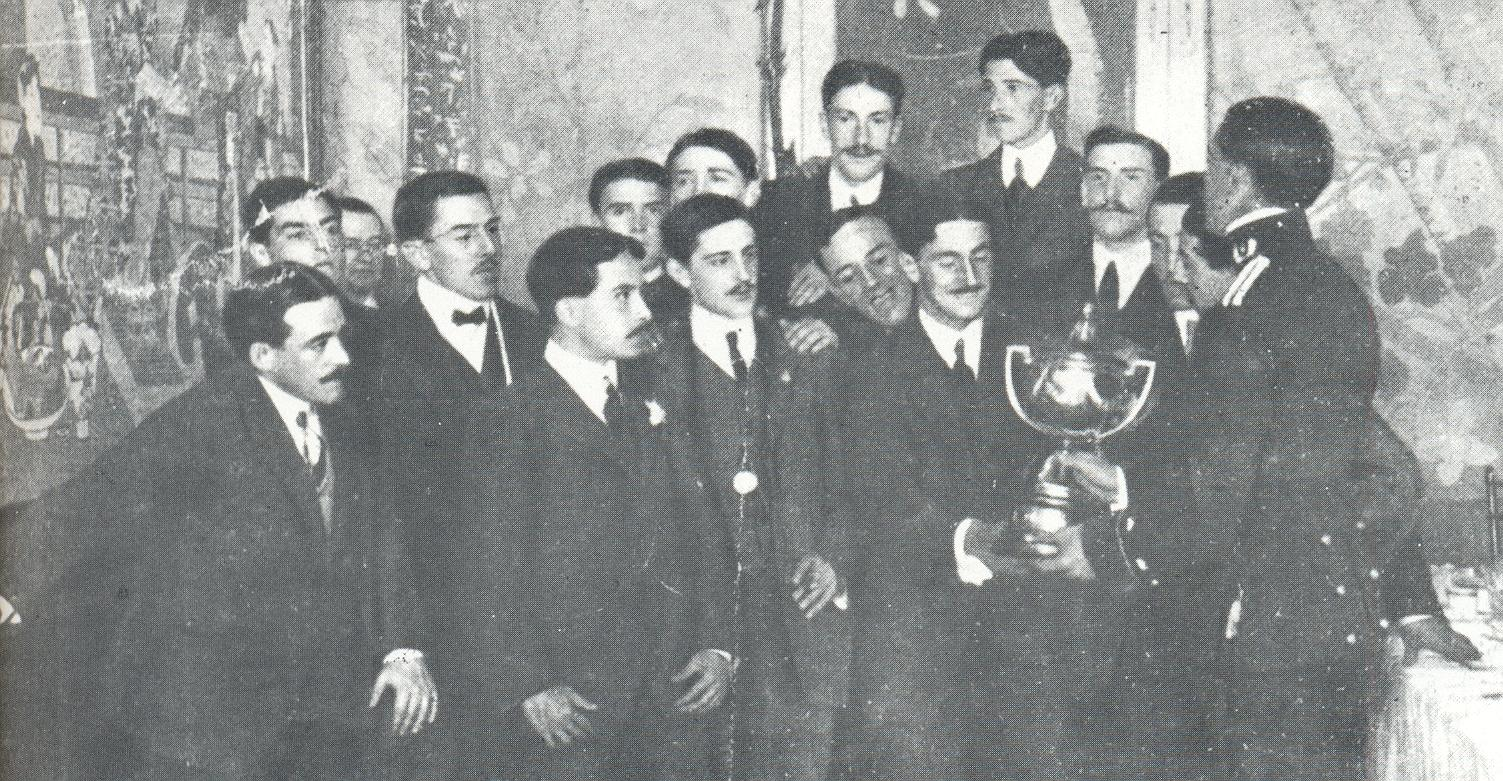
- Club Ciclista players with the trophy
- Event: 1909 Copa del Rey
Club Ciclista	Español FC
3	1
- Date: 8 April 1909
- Venue: Campo de O'Donnell, Madrid
- Referee: (Spain) Alfonso Almasqué

The 1909 Copa del Rey final was the 7th final of the Spanish cup competition, the Copa del Rey. The final was played at Campo de O'Donnell in Madrid on 8 April 1909. The match was won by Club Ciclista, who beat Español Foot-Ball Club of Madrid 3–1. The Ciclista goals were scored by George McGuinness, Charles Simmons and Miguel Sena, with José Giralt reducing the deficit for Español de Madrid late on.

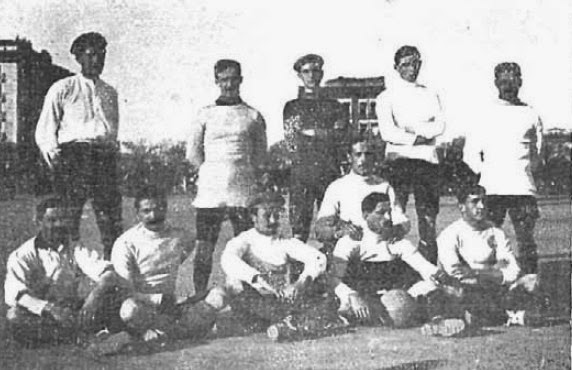
A Club Español team of 1909

The final was played under a heavy downpour and with low temperatures. The match was tough and although Español de Madrid took the initiative, their attack collided again and again with the San Sebastian defense that did take advantage of the opportunities they enjoyed. After 90 minutes of unsuccessful domination from Español de Madrid (they even missed a penalty for a handball in the area), the referee blew the whistle for the end of the match with a result of 3 to 1 for San Sebastián Cycling Club, which was proclaimed Champion of Spain for the first time.

Club Ciclista de San Sebastián are the predecessors of Real Sociedad. After winning the cup trophy, on 7 September 1909 the players of Club Ciclista founded a new in club in San Sebastián, called Vasconia, later they changed the name in Real Sociedad.

The trophy of the 1909 Copa del Rey is in the Real Sociedad museum.

== Match details ==
8 April 1909

Club Ciclista	3–1	Español de Madrid
McGuinness 30' (pen.); Simmons 47'; Sena (2T)		Giralt (2T)

Estadio O'Donnell, Madrid
Referee: (Spain) Alfonso Almasqué

Club Ciclista

Español FC

GK	1	(Spain) Pedro Bea
DF	2	(Spain) Alfonso Sena
DF	3	(Spain) Manuel Arocena
MF	4	(Spain) Domingo Arrillaga
MF	5	(Argentina) Bonifacio Echeverría
MF	6	(Spain) José Rodríguez
FW	7	(Spain) Miguel Sena
FW	8	(Spain) Mariano Lacort
FW	9	(England) Charles Simmons
FW	10	(England) George McGuinness
FW	11	(Spain) José Biribén

GK	1	(Spain) Pablo Lemmel
DF	2	(Spain) José Carruana
DF	3	(Spain) Ramón Méndez
MF	4	(Spain) Manuel Yarza
MF	5	(Spain) José Manuel Kindelán
MF	6	(Spain) Luis Heredia
FW	7	(Spain) Armando Giralt
FW	8	(Spain) José Giralt
FW	9	(Spain) Sánchez Neyra
FW	10	(Spain) Antonio Morales
FW	11	(Spain) Joaquín Rodríguez
