= Enrique Cabrero =

Enrique Cabrero Mendoza
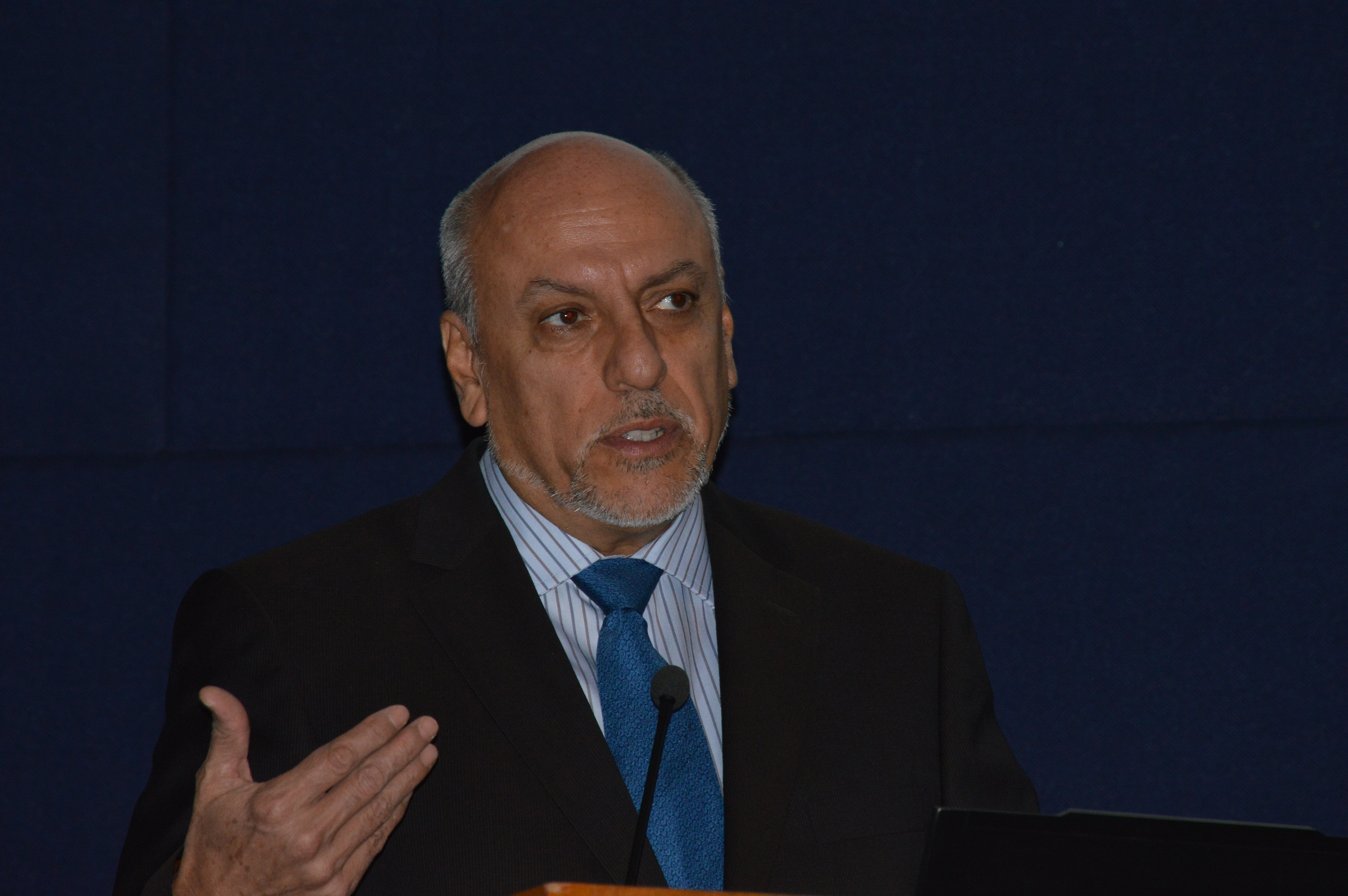

Director of the National Council of Science and Technology
- In office January 3 2013 – 30 November 2018
- President: Enrique Peña Nieto
- Preceded by: José Enrique Villa Rivera
- Succeeded by: María Elena Álvarez-Buylla Roces

Director of the Center for Research and Teaching in Economics
- In office 22 April 2004 – 12 February 2013
- Preceded by: Carlos Elizondo Mayer-Serra
- Succeeded by: Sergio López Ayllón

Personal details
- Born: 8 February 1956 (age 70) San Luis Potosí, Mexico
- Scientific career
- Education: Universidad Autónoma de San Luis Potosí (BA); Centro de Investigación y Docencia Económicas (MPA); HEC Paris (PhD)
- Known for: Director of CONACYT 2013-2018
- Fields: Public Administration
- Workplaces: Centro de Investigación y Docencia Económicas

Enrique Cabrero Mendoza was the director of CONACYT. He was also the general director of CIDE.

== Education ==
He studied the degree in Administration at the Autonomous University of San Luis Potosi, graduating in 1977; subsequently, in 1980 he obtained a master's degree in public administration from the Center for Economic Research and Teaching (CIDE) as well as the Pedagogical Improvement Program from the Center d'Enseignement Supérieur des Affaires, CESA in France in 1982. In 2001 he obtained his PhD in management sciences from the HEC Paris in France.

== Professional career ==
From the beginning of his career, he began working as a research professor in various institutions. He was visiting professor at the École Normale Supérieure of Cachan, in France, at the University of Birmingham in Great Britain and at the Autonomous University of Barcelona in Spain, among others. In addition, he is a member of the National System of Researchers of the National Council of Science and Technology (CONACYT), Level III. Since 1982 he served as professor-researcher of the Public Administration Division of the Center for Economic Research and Teaching (CIDE) since 1982 and in 2004 he held the position of director of this division, to later become director of said center.

== Other charges ==
In 2011 he received the Caballero badge in the Order of the Academic Palms of the French ambassador in Mexico in recognition of his professional career in the academic and public administration fields.

He is founder of the magazine Gestión y Política Pública del (CIDE). Founder of the Government and Local Management Award that the CIDE carries out annually. Author of several books and articles on decentralization issues and local governments.

Among his most recent publications are "Federalism in the United Mexican States" that is part of the series "To Understand"; "Public action and local development" edited by the Economic Culture Fund and the book The institutional design of science and technology policy in Mexico, done in co-authorship with Dr. Sergio López and Dr. Diego Valadés, published by the CIDE and the Legal Research Institute of the UNAM.

== See also ==
- CONACYT
