= Miguel Sena =

Spanish footballer (1884–1969)

Personal information
- Full name: Miguel José Sena Manterola
- Date of birth: 6 November 1884
- Place of birth: San Sebastián, Gipuzkoa, Spain
- Date of death: 16 March 1969 (aged 84)
- Place of death: Spain
- Position: Forward

Senior career*
Years	Team	Apps	(Gls)
??–1906	Unión Vizcaino		
1906–1907	Bizcaya		
1907	San Sebastián RC		
1908–1909	Club Ciclista		
1909–1913	Real Sociedad		
- * Club domestic league appearances and goals

Miguel José Sena Manterola (6 November 1884 – 16 March 1969) was a Spanish footballer who played as a forward for Real Sociedad. His brothers, Alfonso and Gregorio, also played for Real Sociedad.

== Club career ==
Born in San Sebastián, he began his career with Unión Vizcaino. In 1907, the best players from Vizcaino and Athletic Club came together to form Bizcaya, which was specially created to take part in the 1907 Copa del Rey, and he Sena and his brother Alfonso were elected into the team, and both featured in the final, which ended in a 0–1 loss to Madrid CF. After the Bizcaya team was discontinued, Miguel followed Alfonso to Recreation Club, but his spell there was cut short when a conflict between the club's members caused the team to split with several players (including the Sena brothers, Elosegi, Arrillaga and Dorda) leaving to create a new team in 1908, the San Sebastian Football Club.

The team had to play under the name of Club Ciclista to play in the 1909 Copa del Rey, which they unexpectedly, but convincingly won after beating Español de Madrid 3–1 in the final, in which he featured alongside his brother, Alfonso. A few months after this victory, the players who had won the tournament founded the Sociedad de Football (now known as Real Sociedad) on 7 September 1909, definitively disassociating themselves from the Cycling Club. After four seasons with Sociedad, he retired in 1913.

== Honours ==
Club Bizcaya

- Copa del Rey: Runner-up 1907

Club Ciclista

- Copa del Rey: 1909
