= Manuel Fernández Balbuena =

Spanish footballer and mining engineer (1879–1954)

Personal information
- Date of birth: 1879
- Place of birth: Spain
- Date of death: 10 January 1954 (aged 74)
- Place of death: Spain
- Positions: Goalkeeper; defender

Senior career*
Years	Team	Apps	(Gls)
1905–1907	Recreativo de Huelva		
- * Club domestic league appearances and goals

Manuel Fernández Balbuena (1879 – 10 January 1954), sometimes erroneously written Valbuena, was a Spanish footballer who played as a defender for Recreativo de Huelva between 1905 and 1907. Professionally, he was a mining engineer.

== Early life and education ==
Born in 1879, Balbuena studied at the Royal School of Mines of Madrid, and after graduating in mining engineering, he was appointed as such to the Spanish Government in 1902, a position that he held for over four decades until 1943, when he was promoted to Spanish director of mines; in this capacity, he worked with, among others, Leoncio Pajares Gallego.

== Sporting career ==
On 29 October 1904, Balbuena was one of the few non-British people who participated in the Autumn Athletics, a sporting event organized by Recreativo de Huelva for the inauguration of its new facilities, in which he won the shot put competition with an unknown mark.

Together with William Waterson, Robert Geoghegan, who had also participated in the Autumn Athletics, Balbuena was a member of the Huelva squad that participated in the 1906 Copa del Rey. He was the only one of the three to take part in the following edition, this time playing as goalkeeper; in Huelva's last group match, against the defending (and eventual) champions Madrid on 29 March, Balbuena managed to score a goal from open play after getting a hold of the ball inside his area and dribbling several Madrid players, thus becoming the first goalkeeper to do so in the history of the Copa del Rey, but despite this historic effort, Huelva still lost 2–4.

== Professional career ==
As a mining engineer, Balbuena worked with several local mining companies, such as Huelva Copper and Sulphur Mines, Anglo-Spanish Copper Company, and La Compagnie de Mines de Cuivre de San Platon. At some point, he was also director of the Minas de Riotinto, and as such, in October 1929, he was present in the tribute paid to the recently deceased Carlos Kaesmacher, president of the Alkali Company.

From 1934 onwards, Balbuena was also associated with the Spanish glass industry, being president of Veneciana S.A., vice-president of Cristaleria Española S.A., as well as director of some other glass manufacturing companies. In August 1943, he was working in the Centro de Instrucción Comercial in Huelva.

== Personal life ==
Balbuena married Emilia Fernau Bertuelo, and the couple had several children: Carlota, Gustavo, who also became a mining engineer, Leonor, Emilia, Magdalena, and Jorge, the latter dying in combat during the Spanish Civil War.

== Death ==
Balbuena died in Spain on 10 January 1954, at the age of 74.
