= Cipriano Prada =

Spanish footballer (1887–?)

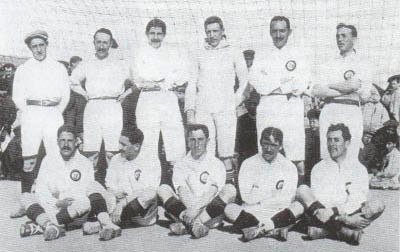
- Prada (seated, first from right) in 1908

Personal information
- Full name: Cipriano Prada Amedo
- Date of birth: 26 September 1887
- Place of birth: Haro, La Rioja, Spain
- Date of death: unknown
- Place of death: Spain
- Position: Midfielder

Senior career*
Years	Team	Apps	(Gls)
1905–1908	Pontevedra SC		
1908	Real Madrid		
1908–1918	Pontevedra SC		
1918	Pontevedra Athletic Club		

International career
1913	Spain (unofficial)	1	(0)
- * Club domestic league appearances and goals

Cipriano Prada Amedo (26 September 1887 – unknown) was a Spanish footballer who played as a midfielder for Real Madrid in Spain.

== Early life ==
Cipriano Prada was born on 26 September 1887 in Haro, La Rioja, as the son of parents from San Vicente de la Sonsierra, La Rioja, and Samaniego, Álava. He was raised between Haro and Bilbao, before settling in Pontevedra, where his family ran the Hotel Méndez Núñez.

== Career ==
Prada began playing football in his hometown club Pontevedra SC, which was the very first club that played football in the city of Pontevedra, where he coincided with his brother Benito and Edmundo Novoa. The fame of Prada and Novoa caused Madrid FC to invite them to the capital to reinforce them in the upcoming 1908 Copa del Rey in April, but they arrived there a month earlier, in March, when the Merengue club was still competing in the Centro regional championship, so Prada made his debut for Madrid on 19 March, scoring the opening goal of a 3–0 victory over Atlético Madrid; there are no records about the next two championship matches, both against Español de Madrid, but it is likely that Novoa started in both as Madrid won the title and thus qualified for the Copa del Rey. On 12 April, both he and Novoa started in the 1908 Copa del Rey final against Vigo FC, helping their side to a 2–1 victory. In total, he played three known matches for Madrid.

In February 1909, he was a member of an early version of a Spain national team with players from clubs from northern Spain (particularly Irún, Fortuna, and Pontevedra) that contested a team of players from southern France at the Pont Jumeaux stadium in Toulouse. Prada then continued playing with Pontevedra for several years, serving as captain, and on 25 May 1913, he is among one of the eleven footballers who played in the first unofficial game of the Spain national team at Estadio de Amute in Hondarribia. Spain faced France (the latter represented by the USFSA) in a 1–1 draw.

In November 1918, Pontevedra SC merged with CD Pontevedra to form Pontevedra Athletic Club, of which Prada was the first captain and coach. After retiring, he became a prominent referee.

== Honours ==
Madrid FC

- Centro Championship:
  - Champions (1): 1907–08
- Copa del Rey:
  - Champions (1): 1908

== See also ==
- List of Real Madrid CF players
