= 1908 Copa del Rey final =

Copa del Rey 1908 final
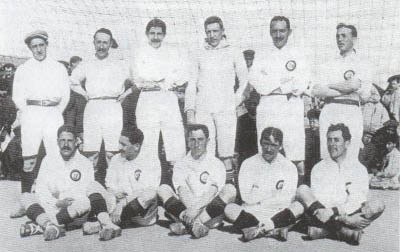
- Madrid FC, champions
- Event: Copa del Rey 1908
Madrid FC	Vigo Sporting
2	1
- Date: 12 April 1908
- Venue: Campo de O'Donnell, Madrid
- Referee: (Spain) José María Abalo
- Attendance: 4,000

The 1908 Copa del Rey final was the 6th final of the Spanish cup competition, the Copa del Rey. The final was played at Campo de O'Donnell in Madrid on 12 April 1908. The match was won by Madrid FC, who beat Vigo Sporting 2–1. The local goals were scored by Antonio Neyra and Federico Revuelto, with Adolfo Posada reducing the deficit for Vigo with 5 minutes remaining.

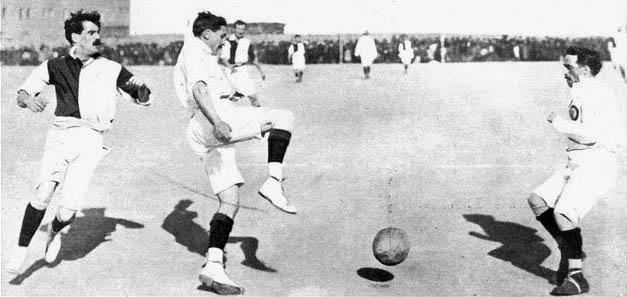
Scene of the match

== Match details ==
12 April 1908

Madrid FC	2–1	Vigo Sporting
Neyra 41'; Revuelto 60'	Report 1 Report 2	Posada 85'

Estadio O'Donnell, Madrid
Attendance: 4,000
Referee: (Spain) José María Abalo

Madrid FC
Vigo Sporting

GK	(England) Federico Lindsey
DF	(Spain) José Berraondo (c)
DF	(Spain) Edmundo Novoa
MF	(Spain) José María de Aspiunza
MF	(France) Enrique Normand
MF	(Spain) Manuel Yarza
FW	(Spain) Pedro Parages
FW	(Spain) Manuel Prast
FW	(Spain) Antonio Neyra
FW	(Guatemala) Federico Revuelto
FW	(Spain) Cipriano Prada

GK	(Spain) Raúl López
DF	(England) C. Werre
DF	(Spain) Manuel Ocaña
MF	(Spain) César Rodríguez
MF	(Spain) Antonio Conde
MF	(Spain) Manuel Baraja
FW	(Spain) Adolfo Posada
FW	(Spain) Francisco Estévez
FW	(Spain) Joaquín Yarza
FW	(England) Nagle
FW	(Spain) Pepe Rodríguez
