= Isidro Lloret =

Spanish lawyer and sports leader

- Born: Isidre Lloret i Massaguer; 1880; Barcelona, Catalonia, Spain
- Died: 1922 (aged 41–42); Barcelona, Catalonia, Spain
- Citizenship: Spanish
- Occupations: Lawyer; Sports leader
- Known for: President of the Catalan Football Federation

5th president of the Catalan Football Federation
- In office December 1906 – 1908
- Preceded by: Udo Steinberg
- Succeeded by: Juli Marial
Association football career
- Full name: Isidro Lloret
- Position: Forward
Senior career*
Years	Team	Apps	(Gls)
1904–1905	X Sporting Club		
- * Club domestic league appearances and goals

Isidro Lloret Massaguer (1880–1922) was a Spanish footballer, referee, and a lawyer specializing in municipal law and the first director of the School of Local Administration of Catalonia of the Provincial Deputation of Barcelona, created in 1914. He was also a director of X Sporting Club and then president of the Catalan Football Federation between December 1906 and 1908.

== Football career ==
Lloret was a member of RCD Espanyol until 1905 when the club had to suspend its activities due to a lack of players since most of them were university students who enrolled to study at universities outside Catalonia in the 1905–06 academic year. Like him, most of Espanyol's players joined X Sporting Club, such as Emilio Sampere, Ángel Ponz, and goalkeeper Pedro Gibert. In his first season at the club, Lloret played a few matches, including a Catalan championship fixture against FC Barcelona on 11 December 1904, which ended in a 0–1 loss; however, it was X who ended up winning the championship.

== Presidency of the Catalan Football Federation ==
Lloret hung up his boots shortly after, but remained closely linked to X as the club's director. At the end of 1906, he became president of the Association of Football Clubs, which he dissolved to create the Catalan Football Federation, thus being the person in charge of this transition.

His presidency was marked by its anti-Barcelonista sentiment, which caused Barça to lose the Catalan Championships of 1907 and 1908 irregularly, so Barcelona accused Lloret of benefiting his former club X during the Catalan championship in 1908. Lloret thus quickly became the protagonist of a controversy in which he was accused of favoring his team, for which he received heavy criticism and strong harassment from the sports press, so much so that he resigned in 1908, being replaced by the then Barça player Juli Marial, who accepted the presidency of the Federation in October 1908.

Three years later, on 22 January 1911, Lloret refereed a Catalan championship match between Barcelona and Català FC, which ended in a 1–3 loss to the latter.

== Professional career ==
In his professional life, Lloret was a lawyer who specialized in municipal law, and as such, he became a professor of municipal law. Additionally, he was an official of the City Council of Barcelona and as such, he participated in the drafting of the Statute of the Commonwealth of Catalonia in 1914. On 2 March 1914, he became the first director of the School of Local Administration of Catalonia of the Provincial Deputation of Barcelona.

In 1915, Lloret began organizing the Setmanes Municipals (Municipal Weeks). In 1914, he published two books about his line of work Publicà Dret municipal vigent and Dret orgànic municipal (Current Municipal Law and Municipal Organic Law).

== Death ==
Lloret died in 1922, at the age of either 41 or 42.
