= Consejo Nacional de Humanidades, Ciencias y Tecnologías =

Mexican government agency

Coordinates: 19.4308°N 99.1606°W

Consejo Nacional de Humanidades, Ciencias y Tecnologías (CONAHCYT)
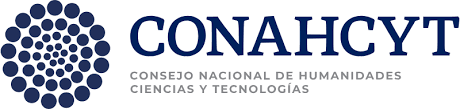
- Founded: 1970
- Headquarters: Av. Insurgentes Sur 1582, Col. Crédito Constructor, Del. Benito Juárez C.P. 03940, Mexico City
- Director: María Elena Álvarez-Buylla Roces

The Consejo Nacional de Humanidades, Ciencias, y Tecnologías (Spanish for National Council of Humanities, Sciences, and Technologies; abbreviated CONAHCYT) was Mexico's entity in charge for the promotion of science and technology from 1970 to 2024. As a federal agency of Mexico, it was responsible for setting government policies on research and technological development, establishing public research centers, and funding scientific laboratories, research projects and postgraduate studies. In 2025, President Claudia Sheinbaum promoted the agency to the level of secretariat (i.e. ministry or department): the Secretaría de Ciencia, Humanidades, Tecnología e Innovación.

== Programs ==
CONAHCYT granted scholarships for graduate studies (masters and doctoral) in Mexico for programs that have been recognized by CONAHCYT in the Registry of Quality Graduate Programs (abbreviated PNPC in Spanish). CONAHCYT also granted scholarships for Mexican nationals to pursue graduate studies in foreign countries. CONAHCYT also provided funding for postdoctoral positions and sabbatical leaves.

CONAHCYT also administered the National System of Researchers (abbreviated as SNI, in Spanish), a national network promoting high quality scientific research. Membership to the system and the level assigned (candidate, I, II, III, emeritus) dependents on scientific productivity and is evaluated by peer committees. Members of SNI, both Mexican and foreign, receive a monthly stipend directly from CONAHCYT only if they work in institutions or universities located in Mexico. The specific amount of the monetary stipend increases depending on the membership level. Mexican nationals working full time on research-related activities but ascribed to institutions located outside Mexico are eligible for membership but not for the stipend. In these cases, the appointment is considered a distinction.

== Research centers ==
CONAHCYT also managed programs to encourage industry and private sector involvement in science and technology R&D through the RENIECYT (National Registry of Institutions and Businesses in Science and Technology) to offer financing to technical and technological development projects.

CONAHCYT also managed 26 public research centers (CPI) located in several parts of Mexico and dedicated usually to a narrow field of science. Some of the best known are:

- CIDE (Center for Research and Teaching in Economics)
- COLMEX (College of Mexico)
- CIMAT (Center for Research in Mathematics)
- INAOE (National Institute of Astrophysics, Optics and Electronics)
- CICESE (Ensenada Center for Scientific Research and Higher Education)
- INFOTEC (Center for Research and Innovation in Information Technology and Communications)
- CIDETEQ (Center for Innovation and Technological Development in Electrochemistry)
- CIO (Center for Research in Optics)
- CentroGeo (Center for Research in Geography and Geomatics)
- COMIMSA (Mexican Coorportaion of Materials Research)
- CIDESI (Center for Engineering and Industry Development)

== General directors ==
The head of CONAHCYT was appointed directly by the President of Mexico. Since CONAHCYT was founded it has been led by:

- Eugenio Méndez Docurro M.Sc. in engineering (1971–1972)
- Gerardo Bueno Zirión, Ph.D. (1973–1976)
- Edmundo Flores Flores, Ph.D. (1977–1982)
- Héctor Mayagoitia Domínguez, Ph.D. (1983–1988)
- José Gerstl Valenzuela, Ph.D. (1988)
- Manuel V. Ortega Ortega, Ph.D. (1989–1990)
- Fausto Alzati, Ph.D. (1991–1994)
- Carlos Bazdresch Parada, Ph.D. (1995–2000)
- Jaime Parada Ávila, Ph.D. (2001–2005)
- Gustavo Chapela Castañares, Ph.D. (2005–2006)
- Juan Carlos Romero Hicks, M.A. (2007 to 2011)
- José Enrique Villa Rivera, Ph.D. (2011 to 2012)
- Enrique Cabrero Mendoza, Ph.D. (2012 to 2018)
- María Elena Álvarez-Buylla Roces, Ph.D. (2018 to 2024)

== Press agency ==
CONAHCYT had its own press agency to cover topics of science and technology in Mexico.

== Controversies ==
In 2006 the director of CONAHCYT named new general directors of two Public Research Centers (IPICYT and CIMAT). This was criticized, because it was seen as the director overstepping his authority and even violating the Constitution as it denied the autonomous nature granted to Mexican CPIs.
