= Manuel Yarza =

Spanish footballer

Manuel Mauricio Yarza
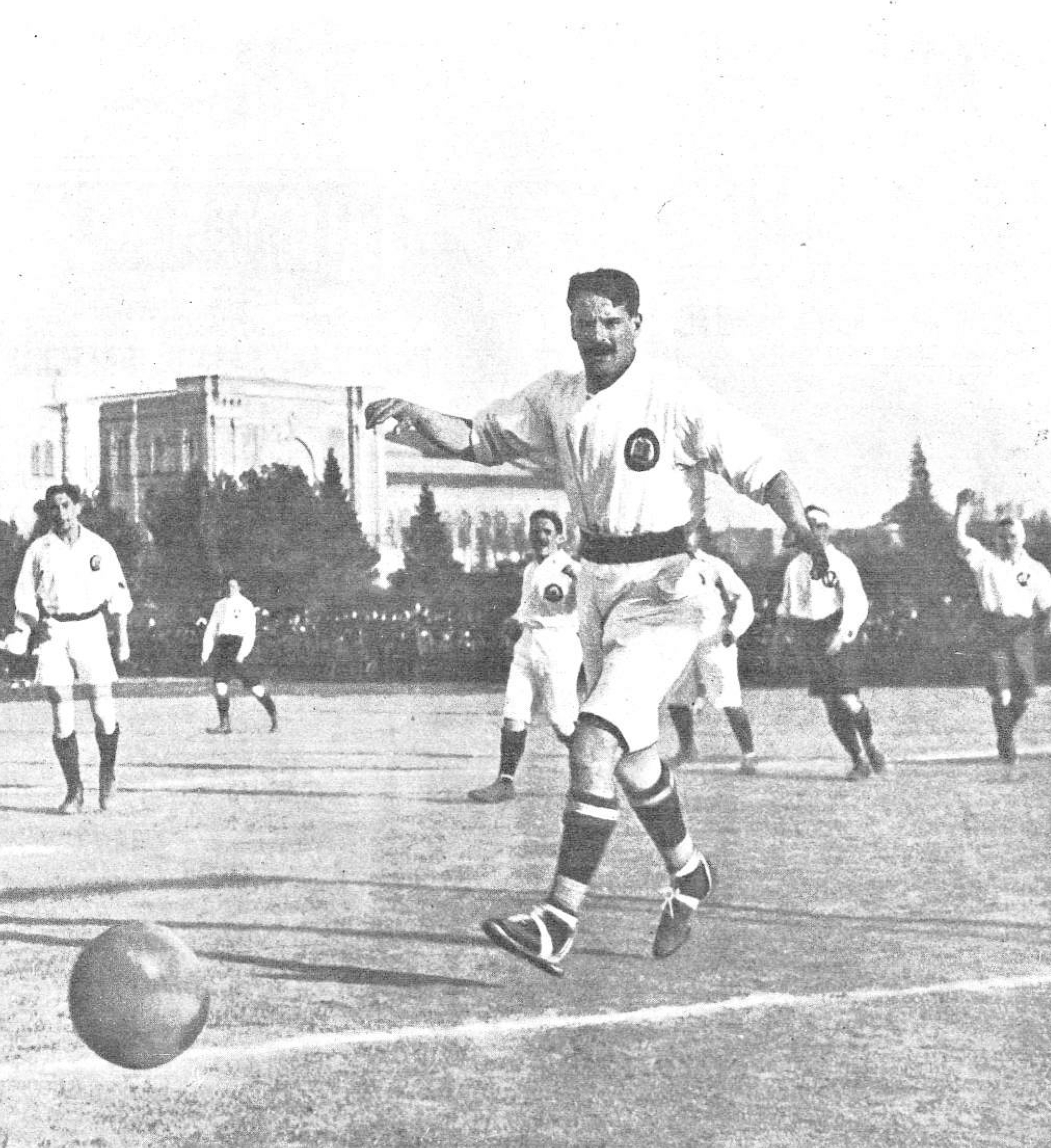
- Yarza in 1907 against Club Vizcaya

Personal information
- Full name: Manuel Yarza
- Date of birth: 1884
- Place of birth: Vigo, Pontevedra
- Date of death: Unknown
- Position: Midfielder

Senior career*
Years	Team	Apps	(Gls)
1903–1904	Moderno FC		
1904–1908	Madrid FC		
1908–1911	Club Español de Madrid		
- * Club domestic league appearances and goals

Manuel Mauricio Yarza (1884 – Unknown) was a Spanish footballer who played as a midfielder who played for Madrid FC (now known as Real Madrid). Along with his brother Joaquín Yarza, he was a historic member of Madrid FC and won the Copa del Rey four times in a row, between 1905 and 1908. Furthermore, he is one of the only players to have reached the Copa del Rey Final six times in a row, doing so between 1905 and 1910 with Madrid FC and Club Español de Madrid.

== Club career ==
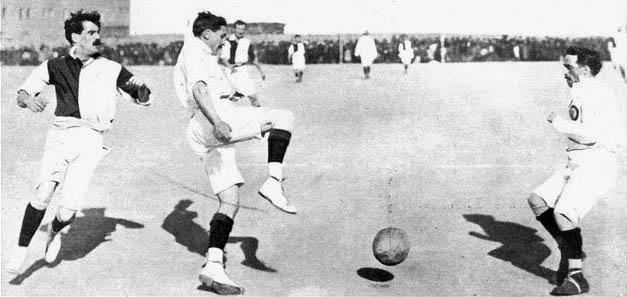
Joaquin (left) and Manuel (middle) in the 1908 Copa del Rey Final

Born in Vigo as the son of an innovator of the naval industrial sector José Joaquín Yarza Albea, a native of Donostia, he began his career at Moderno FC during the 1903–04 season, but just a few months later the club folded due to financial reasons, and it had to merge with Madrid FC (the merger of the entities briefly known as Madrid-Moderno FC), and he and his brother joined the first team of Madrid, for which he played until 1908. He played a pivotal role in the club's four back-to-back Copa del Rey titles between 1905 and 1908. In the 1908 final, the Yarza brothers were rivals, as Joaquin was now defending the colors of Vigo FC. He stayed loyal to the club until 1908, when he left for Club Español de Madrid, with whom he reached another two cup finals in 1909 and 1910, losing both, the latter thanks to a goal from Remigio Iza.

== Honours ==
Madrid FC

- Campeonato Regional Centro:
  - Champions (4): 1904–05, 1905–06, 1906–07 and 1907–08.
- Copa del Rey:
  - Champions (4): 1905, 1906, 1907 and 1908

Club Español de Madrid

- Campeonato Regional Centro:
  - Champions (1): 1908–09
- Copa del Rey:
  - Runners–up (2): 1909 and 1910
