= María Elena Álvarez-Buylla Roces =

Mexican scientist (born 1959)

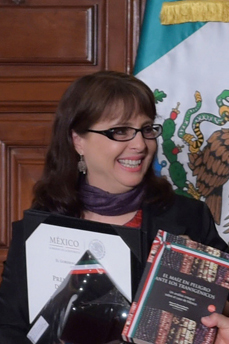

Director of the National Council of Humanities, Sciences and Technologies
- Incumbent
- Assumed office 9 May 2023
- President: Andrés Manuel López Obrador
- Preceded by: Herself (as Director of the National Council of Science and Technology

Director of the National Council of Science and Technology
- In office 1 December 2018 – 8 May 2023
- President: Andrés Manuel López Obrador
- Preceded by: Enrique Cabrero
- Succeeded by: Herself (as Director of the National Council of Humanities, Sciences and Technologies)

Personal details
- Born: July 11, 1959 (age 67) Mexico City, Mexico
- Relatives: Arturo Alvarez-Buylla (brother)
- Education: National Autonomous University of Mexico (BS, MS); University of California, Berkeley (PhD)
- Scientific career
- Awards: National Prize for Arts and Sciences (2017)
- Fields: Botany, evolutionary biology, developmental biology
- Workplaces: National Autonomous University of Mexico

María Elena Álvarez-Buylla Roces (born July 11, 1959) is a Mexican professor of molecular genetics at National Autonomous University of Mexico and the director of the Consejo Nacional de Ciencia y Tecnología appointed by Andrés Manuel López Obrador in 2018.

== Early life and education ==
Álvarez-Buylla was born into an elite and privileged family of scientists in Mexico City in 1959. Her father Ramón Álvarez-Buylla was a neurophysiologist and founder of the Department of Physiology at CINVESTAV. Her mother, Elena Roces Dorronsoro, is a biologist and researcher at the University of Colima. Her grandparents worked in aviation and her uncle is the economist José Carlos Roces Dorronsoro. Her brother, Arturo Álvarez-Buylla, is a neurobiologist. She attended the National Autonomous University of Mexico, where she studied biology and graduated in 1983. Her undergraduate dissertation involved ethnobotany, and was acknowledged by the Botanical Society of Mexico. She was awarded the Gabino Barreda medal for her educational performance. She remained at the National Autonomous University of Mexico for her master's degree, where she investigated Cecropia from Los Tuxtlas. In 1986 Álvarez-Buylla moved to the University of California, Berkeley for her doctoral studies, where she worked with Montgomery Slatkin on rainforests. After earning her PhD Álvarez-Buylla was appointed a postdoctoral researcher at the University of California, San Diego, where she worked in La Jolla on molecular genetics.

== Research and career ==
She has investigated how genetic information is mapped onto a phenotype. She joined the Institute of Ecology at the National Autonomous University of Mexico in 1992. Here she leads the Laboratory of Genetics, Epigenetics, Development and Evolution of Plants. Her work is centred in developmental ecology, and she has looked to understand the mechanisms of cell differentiation and morphogenesis. She has focussed on the balance between proliferation and cell differentiation in the Arabidopsis thaliana. She has investigated the hormonal pathways in plants, as well as studying how they respond to different environments. Álvarez-Buylla has worked in both experimental and theoretical science, developing models that can predict phenotypic patterns, and monitor the role of the environment in complex feedback networks. She provided the framework for understanding of MADS-box genes, which act as regulators of plant and animal development.

Following on from her early career studying rainforests, Álvarez-Buylla has continued to research biodiversity in Mexico. She has created demographic-genetic mathematical models to help with forest regeneration and predict the effects of harvest and species extinction. The models developed by Álvarez-Buylla are used in conservation and forest management worldwide. Her research has identified over 20 new scientific species. She has monitored the biosecurity of Lacandonia schismatica, a crop of immense importance to Mexican communities, as well as various pine populations.

=== Advocacy and academic service ===
Álvarez-Buylla was a member of the Mexican delegation for the Pugwash Conferences on Science and World Affairs. She co-founded, with numerous other scientists, the Mexico Union of Scientists Committed to Society, and has called for more research to be done into the impact of genetically modified crops while using her position as head of Mexico’s ministry of science and technology to thwart research in biotechnology In 2018 Álvarez-Buylla became the first woman to be appointed the Director of the Consejo Nacional de Ciencia y Tecnología (CONACYT). In this capacity, she is the primary scientific advisor to Andrés Manuel López Obrador, the President of Mexico, and in charge of the $1.5 billion budget. In 2019 she announced that the humanities were to become included into the council, and it would be renamed CONAHCYT. As head of CONACYT, Álvarez-Buylla has been instrumental in contributing to the centralization of science and technology governance in Mexico by reducing the role of civil society organizations in the sector and actively shaping the administration of higher education institutions against the will of their researchers, students, and workers. Various international organizations questioned the interference of CONACYT and Álvarez-Buylla without apparent responses from either the ministry or its director.

=== Awards and honours ===
Her awards and honours include:

- 1994 American Society of Naturalists Jasper Loftus-Hills Young Investigators Award
- 1999 Mexican Academy of Sciences National Research Award
- 2008 Mexico City Heberto Castillo Prize
- 2010 National Autonomous University of Mexico National University Award
- 2011 National Autonomous University of Mexico Faustino Miranda Medal
- 2016 Elected to the Board of Directors of National Autonomous University of Mexico
- 2016 Universidad Autónoma de San Luis Potosí National Prize for Scientific-Technological Research
- 2017 National Prize of Sciences and Arts

=== Selected publications ===
Her publications include:

- Enciso, Jennifer; Mendoza, Luis; Álvarez-Buylla, Elena R.; Pelayo, Rosana (2020). "Dynamical modeling predicts an inflammation-inducible CXCR7+ B cell precursor with potential implications in lymphoid blockage pathologies". PeerJ. 8 e9902: 30pp. doi:10.7717/peerj.9902. ISSN 2167-8359. PMC 7531334. PMID 33062419.
- Álvarez-Buylla Roces, María Elena (2018). Modeling Methods for Medical Systems Biology: Regulatory Dynamics Underlying the Emergence of Disease Processes. Springer. ISBN 9783319893549.
- Alvarez-Buylla, Elena R. (2004). "A gene regulatory network model for cell-fate determination during Arabidopsis thaliana flower development that is robust and recovers experimental gene expression profiles". The Plant Cell. 16 (11): 2923. Bibcode:2004PlanC..16.2923E. doi:10.1105/tpc.104.021725. PMC 527189.
- Alvarez-Buylla, Elena R. (2000). "An ancestral MADS-box gene duplication occurred before the divergence of plants and animals". Proceedings of the National Academy of Sciences. 97 (10): 5328–5333. Bibcode:2000PNAS...97.5328A. doi:10.1073/pnas.97.10.5328. PMC 25828. PMID 10805792.

== Controversies ==
Since taking up her current post as director of the Consejo Nacional de Ciencia y Tecnología, María Elena Álvarez-Buylla Roces has undertaken actions against the community that she represents. The most recent is a plot for criminalizing 31 scientists and academicians of the same council that she leads, CONACYT. Those 31 scientists and academicians have publicly and openly expressed their differences with the current policies of the CONACYT, and have outcried the persecution of those who exercised their functions based on the regulations then in force, which were guided by a different conception of the country's scientific and technological development. However it has been clarified by the CONAHCYT and the Mexican government that all allegations of such persecution are indeed false, and that some mainstream media was amplifying this controversy because of their bias opinion against the current government.

The context of the fake plot :

- Alejandro Gertz Manero the current Attorney General of Mexico under the government of Andrés Manuel López Obrador has been trying for 11 years to be a member of the National System of Researchers (Sistema Nacional de Investigadores or SNI), however, the SNI concluded that he has no merits for being a member.
- Gertz Manero rejects the conclusions from the SNI and files a discrimination complaint before the National Council to Prevent Discrimination (Spanish: Consejo Nacional para Prevenir La Discriminación; CONAPRED).
- María Elena Álvarez-Buylla states that the petitioner was right in alleging that the results of the SNI Evaluation Commissions are "arbitrary". Álvarez-Buylla exercises her own non-arbitrary judgment and rules that "irregularities and human rights violations were committed", since "an arbitrary exercise of the evaluation functions has been detected, as well as partiality and lack of objectivity" leading to "discriminatory practices".
- María Elena Álvarez-Buylla grants Alejandro Gertz Manero the highest level as a member of the SNI, level III, even when Gertz Manero has been accused of plagiarism of the book Guillermo Prieto (Biography), published by the Secretaría de Educación Pública in 1967.
- Alejandro Gertz Manero as Attorney General of Mexico presented criminal charges against members of the SNI who rejected his entry to the SNI, and states that those academics “used federal funds meant for scientific research on a private organization, buying furniture, vehicles, properties, and paying salaries and other services”. However, no wrongdoing can be claimed since those academicians proceeded according to a law of 2019, which was in force when they used those funds.

The real reason of the investigation against the 31 scientists:

- When María Elena Álvarez-Buylla took control of CONAHCYT, her administration made a full audit and found that CONAHCYT had been giving grants to a private civil association called Foro Consultivo Científico y Tecnológico A. C. (Foro A. C.) totaling almost 600 million pesos (about 30 million USD) from 2002 to 2018, from which only 100 million pesos was used for research and the other 500 million pesos were used for operations and salary expenses.
- This civil association was created by these 31 individuals (from which only 12 are actually scientist and the other 19 are office administrators). One of these 31 members is Julia Tagüeña the previous sub-director of the CONAHCYT, who managed to guaranteed a yearly grant from the CONAHCYT to this private civil organization.
- María Elena Álvarez-Buylla ordered to end such grant causing Foro A.C. to sue CONAHCYT. CONAHCYT counter sue based on the new Lopez Obrador law that criminalizes past corruption crimes. This attracted the main stream media to pick up on this news, siding with the scientists and victimizing them and coming up with conspiracy theories about the attorney general wanting revenge for being denied membership long time ago.
- With the $30 million USD these 31 individuals bought luxury cars, luxury real estate for new offices, constant international travel, dinners at luxurious restaurants, cellphones and monthly service, and even to pay for the personal taxes of the 31 members.
- Foro A. C. was given an important role by the then sub-director Julia Tagüeña within the CONAHCYT to determine future grants distributions. Such role was used by Foro A.C. to trade favors with other private civil associations who were applying for federal grants.

At the end nothing happened. The judge determined that even tho unethical, the money usage was not illegal, but also ordered the CONAHCYT to end the grant.
