= San Sebastián Recreation Club =

Football club in Spain active between 1904 and 1909

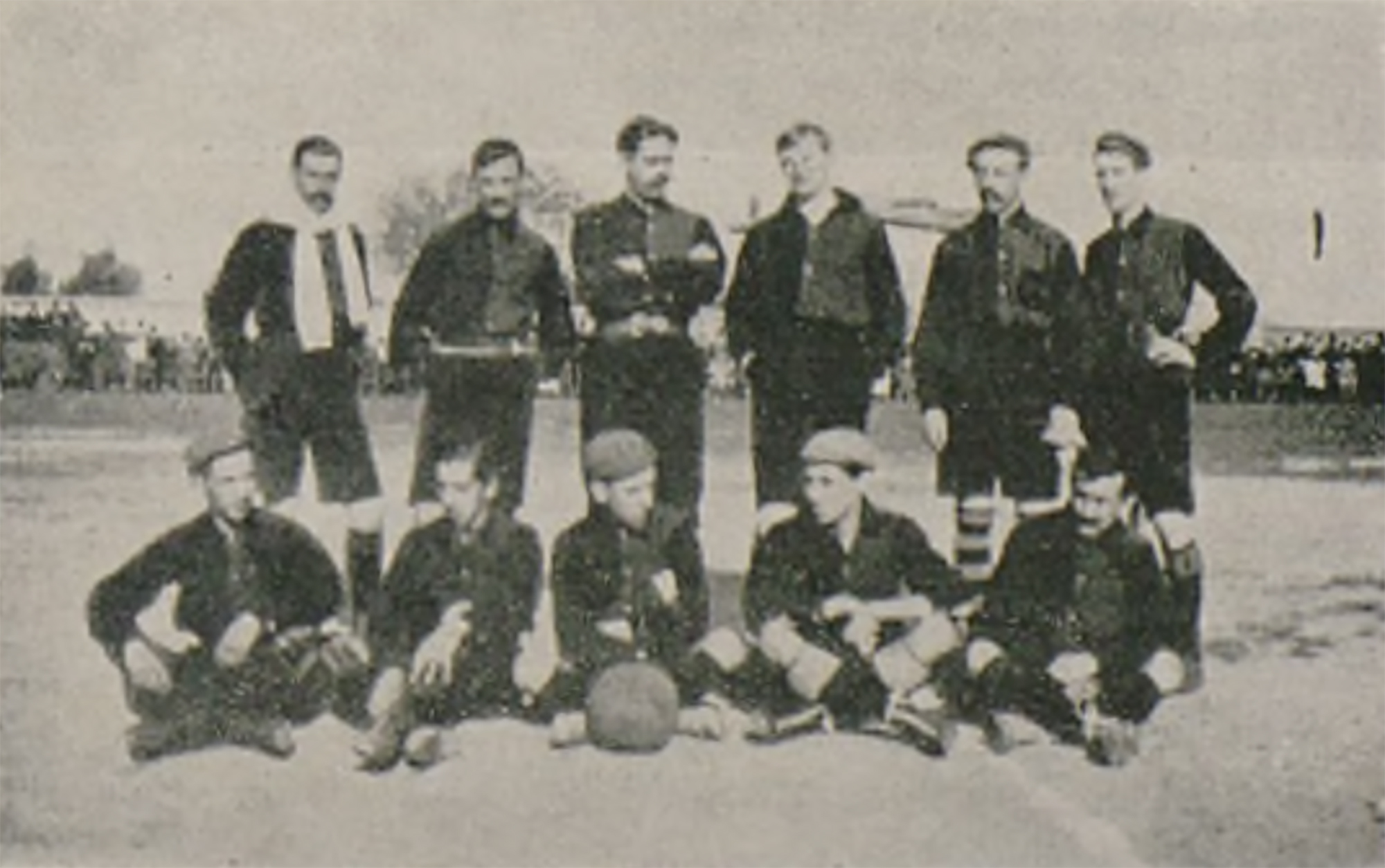
- San Sebastián Recreation Club
- Founded: 28 August 1904
- Dissolved: 1909
- Ground: Ondarreta Stadium
- Chairman: Jorge Satrústegui
Home colours

The San Sebastián Recreation Club was the name of the football section of the Real Club de Tenis de San Sebastián club based in San Sebastián, Basque Country, Spain. It was the first football club in the city and in 1905, they participated in the Copa del Rey.

== History ==
The San Sebastián Recreation Club was founded on 28 August 1904 as part of a multi-sports club known as Real Club de Tenis de San Sebastián, which had numerous other sports such as cricket and athletics, but the most important of which being tennis, hence the entity's name. Football had been introduced to San Sebastián in the early 1900s by students and workers returning from Britain, and this new sport soon gained a lot of followers in the city and among the young athletes of the Real Club de Tenis, hence the founding of the football section on 28 August 1904, being this the first formally established football club in San Sebastián.

== 1905 Copa del Rey ==
The Recreation Club then become the first club in the city, and also the first Gipuzkoan club, to participate in a national championship, when it entered the 1905 Copa del Rey with a team that had the likes of Juan Arzuaga and Alfonso Sena. The tournament was played in a triangle format with the finalists of the first-ever Copa del Rey final in 1903, Madrid FC and Athletic Club, the power of Spanish football at the time. In the first match against the hosts, Madrid FC, they lost by 3–0, who then became champions after beating Athletic Club 1–0 in the second game, meaning that the third game between Recreation Club and Athletic would decide the runner-up, but the former refused to play for silver and went back to Bilbao, so Recreation Club should appear as runner-up in the tournament. However, given that the decisive match of the tournament was the one between Madrid and Athletic, as recognized by the federation itself, this match is considered as the 1907 final and as a result, the team from Bilbao is considered the runner-up.

In 1906, the president of the Recreation Club, Jorge Satrústegui, along with Madrid FC president, Carlos Padrós, and Narciso Masferrer of the Catalan Football Federation, wrote the statutes of the Spanish Football Federation, which shows the importance that the team had in national football. Also in 1906, Recreation Club inaugurates the Ondarreta Stadium, the city's first-ever football stadium.

== Legacy ==
Although the football section of the Real Club de Tenis was short-lived, it played a great role in contemporary football. An internal conflict towards the end of 1907 caused the team to split and several players (such as Miguel and Alfonso Sena, Domingo Arrillaga and Bonifacio Echeverría) left to create a new club in 1908, the San Sebastián Football Club, with Federico Ferreirós as its first president. This team, which continued to play in Ondarreta, adopted the classic blue and white colors of the city flag rather than the striking half-yellow and green shirt of the Recreation Club. At the time, the teams who had not been legally registered for more than a year could not play official matches, so to play the 1909 Copa del Rey, they borrowed the license from the Club Ciclista de San Sebastián, under whose name they presented themselves and won the tournament. A few months after this victory, the players who had won the tournament founded the Sociedad de Football (now known as Real Sociedad) on 7 September 1909, definitively disassociating themselves from the Cycling Club.
