= Vicente Álvarez-Buylla =

Spanish footballer

(4 March 1890 - 27 November 1969) was a Spanish footballer, diplomat and writer. He reached the highest levels both in sports and professionally. As a young man, he played football at the clubs Stadium Avilesino in Asturias, Madrid FC and Español de Madrid in Madrid, and Espanyol in Barcelona, playing a Copa del Rey final with the latter. As an older man, he had a successful diplomatic career, holding several important positions in the Spanish government, including consul in Cuba and the United Kingdom.

He had three brothers, Benito, Plácido and Adolfo, with the first two also being writers and the latter two being footballers.

== Early life ==
Buylla was born in Asturias as the son of (Adolfo A. Buylla, professor of Political Economy and president of the Ateneo de Madrid, and of Carmen Lozana de la Concha. Buylla and his family used to spend the summers in Salinas, where it is known that he and his brothers played football matches with the team from the town of Castrillón.

== Football career ==
Buylla enjoyed his youth playing football, which at the time was a relatively unknown sport in Asturias, being a part of the very first teams in Ávila, such as Círculo Industrial y de Sport de Avilés and Sport Club Avilesino, with whom he played for 12 seasons (1907 to 1919), since he never failed during the summer periods. He was champion of Asturias in the juniors category for two consecutive seasons. As a member of the first team of the Sport Club, he won the Second Prize in the National Championship organized by Santander FC.

All of the Buylla brothers played for Madrid FC, with each spending three years in the capital due to their legal university studies, and due to their family having settled there. Vicente, however, only played for Madrid's third team, where he was Champion in 1908. He also played for Español de Madrid, where together with the Giralt brothers (José and Armando) and Antonio Neyra, Buylla helped the club reach the 1910 Copa del Rey Final (FEF), in which he scored the opening two goals within the first 15 minutes, however, FC Barcelona made a comeback to win the title 3-2.

In 1910, the Giralt brothers, Neyra, and his older brother Plácido left Español to join RCD Espanyol in Barcelona, and they once again proved their quality by reaching yet another cup final in 1911, although this time he did not play in the final, which ended in a 3–1 loss to Athletic Bilbao.

According to the Mundo Deportivo issue of 24 March 1910, the then 19-year-old Buylla was an inside left of 73 kilos in weight and 1,78 meters tall.

== Diplomatic career ==
In 1914, Buylla graduated in law at the University of Oviedo, earning a doctorate at the University of Madrid. In 1916 he won a position as a state lawyer, and in 1920, he joined the diplomatic corps, which did not prevent him from collaborating with the local press. In fact, he was a chronicler for Avilés newspapers and magazines in Barcelona and Madrid, mainly cultivating political journalism and publishing his writings in republican newspapers in Oviedo, such as La región or La República.

In the early 1920s, Buylla was appointed consul in Cuba. There he maintained his football hobby until he was forced to abandon this sport because his rivals allowed him to pass the ball freely due to his status as head of the consulate. Buylla was consul of Spain, assistant to Antonio Pla da Folgueira, in Tangier from 1924 to 1928. In 1928 he left the diplomatic career and returned to Spain, where he was appointed secretary of the Energy Council. In 1931 he was appointed director of administration in the Ministry of State and secretary of the Committee of Studies dedicated to the orientation of new diplomats, at the same time he held the secretariat of the Hydraulic Works Council. In 1933–34 he was a member of the Diplomatic Institute and the Center for Moroccan Studies.

In 1936 he was appointed consul general of Spain in London, a period in which Ramón Pérez de Ayala was ambassador. At the outbreak of the Spanish Civil War he remained faithful to republican legality, and at the end of the war, he remained in exile, becoming the president of Acción Republicana in Great Britain. He also remained in charge of the Spanish consulate in the British capital until the Second World War, at which time he went into exile in Mexico.

From 1960 to 1962, Buylla was minister delegate to the republican government in exile chaired by Emilio Herrera Linares.

== Death ==
Buylla died on 27 November 1969, at the age of 79. One of his sons, Manuel, lives in Venezuela, and the other, Pedro, formed the English branch of the family that resides in Guifford, United Kingdom.

== Works ==
La Pintura contemporánea en España (Matanzas, 1922) Economía y legislación extranjera acerca de energía hidroeléctrica, líneas y redes (Madrid, 1932)
