= Arturo Álvarez-Buylla =

Mexican researcher (born 1958)

Arturo Álvarez-Buylla Roces
- Born: 1958 (age 67–68); Mexico City, Mexico
- Education: National Autonomous University of Mexico (BS); Rockefeller University (PhD)
- Relatives: María Elena Álvarez-Buylla Roces (sister)
- Awards: Prince of Asturias Award for Scientific and Technical Research (2011)
- Scientific career
- Fields: Neuroscience
- Workplaces: University of California, San Francisco

Arturo Álvarez-Buylla Roces is a professor and endowed chair in neurological surgery, and a researcher in neurobiology at the University of California, San Francisco.

== Early life and education ==
Arturo Álvarez-Buylla was born and raised in Mexico City. He earned an undergraduate degree in biomedical research from Autonomous National University before pursuing his Ph.D. in neurobiology from Rockefeller University in New York. At Rockefeller University, he researched the process of formation of neurons in adult mammals before moving to UCSF in 2000.

== Career ==
Álvarez-Buylla is a professor and endowed chair in neurological surgery at the University of California, San Francisco. His research as a Principal Investigator at the Brain Tumor Research Center is in the fields of developmental neuroscience and neurobiology.

In 2011, Álvarez-Buylla and his lab discovered findings relating to the incorporation of new neurons into adult brains. Additionally, Álvarez-Buylla has worked on designing research devices. His designs include devices for laboratory applications such as tissue mounts, mapping systems for tissue sections, and staining techniques.

Álvarez-Buylla's more recent research is primarily focused on the mechanisms of neurogenesis from neuronal stem cells that occupy different germinal niches. Álvarez-Buylla's laboratory found that adult neural stem cells are specialized to produce different neuronal cells based on their location in the ventricle. Specifically, he is investigating the possible inhibition of nervous system activity in people with neurological conditions due to embryonic medial ganglionic eminence (MGE) cells. By analyzing the balance between inhibitory and excitatory signaling in the nervous system from MGE cells, Álvarez-Buylla contributed to the development of treatments for Parkinson's disease, traumatic brain injury, epilepsy, and spinal cord injury.

Álvarez-Buylla and his lab investigate plasticity and brain repair mechanisms from the introduction of new neurons through transplantation or by natural processes of endogenous stem cells. His laboratory is looking into the contribution of new neurons using the strategies his team has developed for transplanting local circuit nerves into the cerebral cortex.

Álvarez-Buylla is a member for the Royal Academy of Science in Spain, the Academia de Ciencias de America Latina, the Society for Neuroscience, the Society for Biochemistry, the International Brain Research Organization, the National Academy of Sciences, the American Academy of Arts and Sciences, and the International Brain Research Organization. Álvarez-Buylla has been awarded six grants by the National Institutes of Health (NIH) as principal investigator—most recently for “Structure and function of a novel population of regenerating ependymal cells” (2020).

== Selected publications ==
- Doetsch F, Caillé I, Lim DA, García-Verdugo JM, Alvarez-Buylla A. “Subventricular zone astrocytes are neural stem cells in the adult mammalian brain.” Cell vol. 97,6 (1999): 703–16. doi:10.1016/s0092-8674(00)80783-7.
- Kriegstein, Arnold, and Arturo Alvarez-Buylla. “The glial nature of embryonic and adult neural stem cells.” Annual review of neuroscience vol. 32 (2009): 149–84. doi:10.1146/annurev.neuro.051508.135600
- Doetsch F, García-Verdugo JM, Alvarez-Buylla A. “Cellular composition and three-dimensional organization of the subventricular germinal zone in the adult mammalian brain.” The Journal of neuroscience : the official journal of the Society for Neuroscience vol. 17,13 (1997): 5046–61. doi:10.1523/JNEUROSCI.17-13-05046.1997
- Alvarez-Dolado M, Pardal R, Garcia-Verdugo JM, Fike JR, Lee HO, Pfeffer K, Lois C, Morrison SJ, Alvarez-Buylla A. “Fusion of bone-marrow-derived cells with Purkinje neurons, cardiomyocytes and hepatocytes.” Nature vol. 425,6961 (2003): 968–73. doi:10.1038/nature02069
- Seri B, García-Verdugo JM, McEwen BS, Alvarez-Buylla A. “Astrocytes give rise to new neurons in the adult mammalian hippocampus.” The Journal of neuroscience : the official journal of the Society for Neuroscience vol. 21,18 (2001): 7153–60. doi:10.1523/JNEUROSCI.21-18-07153.2001

== See also ==
- María Elena Álvarez-Buylla Roces
- Ramon Alvarez-Buylla
