= Adolfo A. Buylla =

Spanish sociologist, pedagogue, jurist, and economist (1850–1927)

- Born: Adolfo Álvarez-Buylla and González-Alegre; 1 December 1850; Oviedo, Asturias, Spain
- Died: 27 October 1927 (aged 76); Madrid, Spain
- Citizenship: Spanish
- Occupations: Sociologist; Pedagogue; Jurist; Economist; Professor; Writer
- Known for: President of the Ateneo de Madrid

President of the Ateneo de Madrid
- In office 1922–1923
- Preceded by: Count of Romanones
- Succeeded by: Ángel Ossorio y Gallardo

Adolfo Álvarez-Buylla and González-Alegre (1 December 1850 – 27 October 1927) was a Spanish economist, politician, professor, jurist, pedagogue, and social reformer.

He was one of the members of the Grupo de Oviedo, and a professor of Political Economy at the Universities of Valladolid, Oviedo, and in the Real Academia de Ciencias Morales y Políticas. He was also a professor and president of the Ateneo de Madrid. His writings began to be published when he was still very young, collaborating with the Revista de Asturias, among others.

== Early life and education ==
Buylla was born on 1 December 1850 in Oviedo, as a descendent from two of the most representative families of the progressive and republican bourgeoisie of Asturias. He was the legitimate son of the doctor Plácido Álvarez-Buylla and María de la Concepción González-Alegre. He began his studies in Oviedo, where he obtained a bachelor's degrees in arts at the Secondary Education Institute of Oviedo on 20 June 1865, at the age of 15. He then went to the University of Oviedo, where he obtained bachelor's degrees in Philosophy and Letters in 1867 (excellent); jurisprudence in 1869 (passed), and Civil and Canon Law, a career in which he graduated in 1870 (approved), at the age of 19.

Buylla then moved to the Central University of Madrid, where he studied Philosophy of Law and International Law (passed), Comparative Legislation (passed), and History of the Church (passed). It was also there that he had his first contact with Krausism through the doctoral teachings of Francisco Giner de los Ríos. After the defense of a memoir on the jury, he obtained a doctorate in Civil and Canon Law in 1871. In 1872 he graduated in philosophy and letters with a work about Marcus Accio Plautus, earning a doctorate in 1873, and in the following year, he also obtained a doctorate of philosophy at the University of Salamanca with a doctoral thesis on sacred poetry in the Century of Spanish gold.

== Academic career ==
In 1874, Buylla returned to his hometown, where on 4 March, he was appointed assistant professor at the Faculty of Law of the University of Oviedo, and in the following year, on 27 August 1875, he was appointed for that same role, but now at the Faculty of Philosophy and Letters (took office on 3 September), a position he combined with that of charity lawyer for the province of Oviedo (9 July). On 25 July 1875, he signed for the vacant chair of "Universal History" at the University of Valladolid, but he was not admitted due to not having the required age (only 25 at the time). On 2 October 1876, he took charge of the chair of Political Economy and Statistics, but ceased it on 30 December when the owner professor returned to his office. On 22 June 1877, he again became a professor of political economy and statistics, but this time at the University of Valladolid, having obtained this chair after a competitive examination, but just six days after taking office on 4 July, he was appointed as professor of the same subject at the University of Oviedo, by virtue of an exchange with Jorge Ledesma; he took possession on 13 August. On 13 November, he was appointed by the rector of the University of Oviedo to be part of the Commission intended to promote the university's attendance at the Exposition Universelle of 1878. On 12 December 1878, he requested the issuance of the professional title of professor, since this was required by legal provisions to continue in practice.

Adolfo Buylla is of the makings of wise men. He is modest by instinct, reflective by duty, studious by vocation; For him, science is a religion and freedom is a homeland... Certain hope for Spanish science.

— Clarín in a comment published in the Revista de Asturias of Oviedo on 15 May 1880.

From 24 November 1879 until 28 October 1881, he was secretary of the Faculty of Law of the University of Oviedo and on 7 January 1889, he was appointed dean of the said faculty after beating Guillermo Estrada and Matías Barrio y Mier. On 12 May 1891, he accessed the honorary category of promotion, and on 17 April 1902, he was promoted to number 90 in the ranks, with a salary of 6,500 pesetas per year.

On 17 August 1910, Buylla was appointed full professor of law, Social Economy and School Legislation at the Higher School of Teaching in Madrid. He served as rector on several occasions in the absences and illnesses of his immediate boss. In 1917, he entered as a full member (medal 29) in the Real Academia de Ciencias Morales y Políticas (Royal Academy of Moral and Political Sciences), after the death of Felipe Sánchez Román. He gave his speech on La reforma social en España (the social reform in Spain) on 25 March, and was received by Rafael Altamira.

== Krausist influence ==
In 1879, Buylla adhered to Krausism in his rectoral speech El socialismo de cátedra. His presence was essential for the consolidation of the so-called Oviedo group, formed by Krausist professors, such as Leopoldo Alas, (Note: He dedicated the inaugural lesson of the 1901-02 academic year to glossing the figure of the recently deceased Leopoldo Alas, as an educator.) Adolfo González Posada, Rafael Altamira, and Aniceto Sela.

Inspired by the Free Institution of Education, founded in 1876 at the initiative of Giner de los Ríos, these professors undertook a work of profound renewal of the intellectual landscape of Oviedo, with pioneering educational projects, such as the Practical School of Legal and Social Studies and the University Extension, an instrument to open the academic institution to Asturian society. He published most of these projects in Revista de Asturias, which he also used to spread the work of the great German economists of the time such as Adolph Wagner and Albert Schäffte.

== Economist ==
As an economist, Buylla very early became prominent in the defense of the Krausist postulates that Gumersindo de Azcárate and José Manuel Piernas Hurtado had opposed in favor of the then hitherto hegemonic liberal tradition. During the solemn opening ceremony of the 1879–80 academic year, for which he was commissioned to prepare the inaugural lecture, he publicly defended socialism by disseminating for the first time in Spain the doctrine of German academic socialism (relied on the work of the Italian Vito Cusumano, Le Scuole Economiche della Germania), warning from the position of Spanish Krausism, whose criticisms of orthodox economics were founded and which resulted in a dangerous statism contrary to economic freedom. Buylla continued this goal of making contemporary German economic thought known, translating in 1885, together with his friend and inseparable companion Adolfo Posada, Albert Schäffle's The Quintessence of Socialism (1875), and in 1894 a good part of the Handbuch der politischen Öekonomie (Handbook of political economy) directed by Schönberg, this time alone.

In his writings on general economics, his main point of reference was the contributions of fellow Spanish professor of economics Gabriel Rodríguez, since Buylla sought to refute the concept of economic science that the well-known liberal economist had presented at the Institución Libre de Enseñanza (ILE), where he was a professor.

In contrast to his more abstract position, Buylla called for a more anthropological economy, which did not reduce man to the place of a mere productive factor, but rather placed him at the center of all his theoretical reflection. The most refined version of his methodological writings was included as an introductory study in the aforementioned translation to Schönberg.

== Social reformer ==
After the creation of the Social Reform Commission in 1883 by Segismundo Moret, local and provincial commissions were formed to allow for the opening of extensive oral and written information on the situation of the working classes, and Buylla was elected, together with César Argüelles, as the executive secretary of the Provincial Commission of Oviedo, for which they wrote the report sent to the Central Commission. From this experience, the social problem became the preferred object of his intellectual activity, becoming one of the earliest defenders of state intervention through coercive labor laws.

In a long series of articles published in the General Magazine of Legislation and Jurisprudence between 1892 and 1901 under the generic title of The Worker and the laws, Buylla made public opinion aware of the creation of reforming institutions and the promulgation of social legislation in the most advanced countries in the world, highlighting the growing delay that Spain was incurring.

For this reason, together with the good relations with Asturian unionism, Buylla was called in 1902, together with Adolfo Posada and the journalist Luis Morote, to collaborate in the project of creating a Labor Institute that the liberal politician José Canalejas intended to integrate into the Ministry of Agriculture that he ran. An untimely change of government prevented its parliamentary approval, but a year later its spirit was collected by the conservative statesman Eduardo Dato at the Institute of Social Reforms.

Both Buylla and Posada were invited in 1904 to direct two sections of the new organization, and despite their reluctance to leave Oviedo, the fact that the presidency had been entrusted to the Krausista Gumersindo de Azcárate was decisive for their acceptance. With this, they left their professorships vacant to take up residence in Madrid to live out their lives. Buylla was responsible for the third section of the institute, in charge of labor statistics services. On 23 April 1904, Buylla was appointed as Head of the technical statistics section of the Institute of Social Reforms in Madrid. He was then authorized to carry out the position and continue to own his chair, receiving the corresponding salary. Starting in 1910 he combined this function with teaching at the Higher School of Teaching, of which he was director from the following year until his retirement.

== Politic career ==
Of republican ideology, Buylla did not want to join the reformist party, a political project sponsored by his friends and coreligionists Melquíades Álvarez and Gumersindo de Azcárate, and remained the leading figure in Asturias of the republican-socialist conjunction. During the 1920s, Buylla ran in several elections as a candidate for the Oviedo constituency, although the split of the anti-dynastic forces deprived him of victory.

== Other activities ==
In 1886, the Asturian teachers Buylla and Adolfo González Posada accompanied Francisco Giner de los Ríos and other members of the ILE on a pedagogical excursion that included a visit to England, where they were able to observe the successes and advantages of the English educational system, which had integrated and accepted sport at university level; Buylla thus promoted the same system in Asturias, which helped develop football in the region, both in prestige and in followers.

On 11 January 1907, Buylla was appointed a member of the board of trustees of the Board of Extension of Studies, and on 16 June 1910, that Board agreed to send him as a delegate to the Congress of Administrative Sciences that took place in Brussels. He held this position until 21 May 1926.

In 1922, Buylla was appointed president of the Ateneo de Madrid, a position that he held for a year until 1923, when he was replaced by Ángel Ossorio y Gallardo.

Buylla was also the Head of the Spanish Section of the League of Human Rights.

== Personal life ==
Buylla was married to Carmen Lozana de la Concha and they had four children: Benito (1879–1941), Plácido (1885–1938), Vicente (1890–1969), and Adolfo (1897–1945).

== Death ==
Buylla died of natural death at his home at number 32 Castelló Street in Madrid on 27 October 1927, at the age of 76. His remains were transferred to Oviedo for his solemn burial in the Salvador cemetery, in an event attended by representatives of the main Asturian institutions, as well as labor organizations.

== Works ==
Buylla was the author of 22 works and participated in many more. Among the best-known works is his passionate biography of Flórez Estrada (1885). He also wrote La quinta esencia del socialismo, Manual of political Economy, and Memoria de la información agraria en Andalucía y Castilla in 1904.

- Studies on the concept of the Economy 1887
- Memoirs of the School of Arts and Crafts of Oviedo 1890–1904.
- Economics, by Neumann, Kleinwaechter, Wagner, Mithof and Lexis 1894
- Memory of agricultural information in Andalusia and Castilla 1904
- Economía 1904
- The Worker and the laws 1905
- Notes on the maximum working day in Spain 1908
- Socialism or socialisms? 1909
- The employment contract 1909
- The protection of the worker 1910
- Lloyd George's financial policy 1911
- Saint-Simon, socialist? 1912
- La reforma social en España 1917
