= 1907 Copa del Rey =

5th Copa del Rey

Tournament details
- Country: Spain
- Teams: 5

Final positions
- Champions: Madrid FC (3rd title)
- Runners-up: Club Vizcaya

Tournament statistics
- Matches played: 11
- Goals scored: 38 (3.45 per match)
- Top goal scorer: (Spain) Antonio Neyra (5 goals)

The Copa del Rey 1907 was the 5th staging of the Copa del Rey, the Spanish football cup competition.

The competition started on 24 March 1907, and concluded on 30 March 1907, with the Final Playoff, in which Madrid FC lifted the trophy for the third time in a row after beating Club Vizcaya 1–0 with a goal from Manuel Prast.

== Participants ==
The tournament reached a new record for clubs participating.

Eleven teams registered to participate: FC Barcelona, Moderno of Guadalajara, Recreativo de Huelva, San Sebastián Recreation Club, Athletic de Madrid, Excelsior of Madrid, Hispania of Madrid, Madrid FC, Club Bizcaya (merger of Athletic Bilbao and Unión Atlética Vizcaína), Hamilton FC of Salamanca and Vigo FC. While the Catalan regional champion X Sporting Club was invited, but again declined to participate due to internal dissent and excessive travel costs.

Of these eleven teams, FC Barcelona and San Sebastian RC withdrew before the draw, while Moderno Guadalajara had their entry rejected by the organizers. Under the rules of the time, the four teams from Madrid had to play a preliminary competition to choose one representative: Madrid FC won this competition to qualify.

Thus, five teams took part in the main tournament:

- Recreativo de Huelva
- Madrid FC
- Club Vizcaya
- Hamilton FC
- Vigo FC

== Group stage ==
24 March 1907

Vigo FC	3–3	Huelva Recreation Club
Pepe Rodríguez 40'; Wilfrid Hambly 60', 80'	Report	? ? ?

Hipódromo, Madrid, Spain
Referee: (Spain) Isidro Lloret
24 March 1907

Club Vizcaya	3–2	Madrid FC
Charles Simmons 60', 80'; Alfonso Sena 75'	Report1; Report2	Federico Revuelto 50'; Manuel Prast 65'

Hipódromo, Madrid, Spain
Referee: (Republic of Ireland) Sidney (Hamilton FC)
25 March 1907

Vigo FC	1–3	Madrid FC
Wilfrid Hambly 30'	Report	José Giralt 20'; Andrés Ocaña 40' (o.g.); Armando Giralt 70'

Hipódromo, Madrid, Spain
Referee: (Spain) Ricardo de Gondra
25 March 1907

Club Vizcaya	5–0	Hamilton FC
Hermenegildo García 10'; Juan Goyoaga 51'; Tomás Murga 59'; Alfonso Sena 60'; Charles Simmons 65'	Report1; Report2

Hipódromo, Madrid, Spain
Referee: (Spain) Isidro Lloret
27 March 1907

Hamilton FC	2–0	Huelva Recreation Club
? ?	Report

Hipódromo, Madrid, Spain
Referee: (Spain) Manuel Yarza (Madrid FC)
27 March 1907

Vigo FC	2–1	Club Vizcaya
Pepe Rodríguez 60'; José María Abalo 80'	Report	Hermenegildo García 70'

Hipódromo, Madrid, Spain
Referee: (Republic of Ireland) Sidney (Hamilton FC)
28 March 1907

Madrid FC	5–0	Hamilton FC
Armando Giralt 10', 70'; Antonio Neyra 50', 55', 85'	Report

Hipódromo, Madrid, Spain
Referee: (Spain) César Baraja
28 March 1907

Club Vizcaya	4–0	Huelva Recreation Club
? ? ? ?

Hipódromo, Madrid, Spain
Referee: (Spain)
29 March 1907

Hamilton FC	1–2	Vigo FC
Patrick Reid 20'	Report	Enrique Lendy 10'; José María Abalo 30'

Hipódromo, Madrid, Spain
Referee: (Spain) Manuel Yarza (Madrid FC)
29 March 1907

Madrid FC	4–2	Huelva Recreation Club
Antonio Neyra; Federico Revuelto; Armando Giralt		? Manuel Balbuena GK

Hipódromo, Madrid, Spain
Referee: (Spain)

Teams	Played	Won	Drawn	Lost	GF	GA	Pts
Club Vizcaya de Bilbao	4	3	0	1	13	4	6
Madrid FC	4	3	0	1	14	6	6
Vigo FC	4	2	1	1	8	8	5
Hamilton FC	4	1	0	3	3	12	2
Huelva Recreation Club	4	0	1	3	5	13	1

== Final ==
At the conclusion of the round-robin tournament, Madrid FC and Club Vizcaya finished level on points; therefore, a playoff match to determine the champion was required.

30 March 1907

Madrid FC	1–0	Club Vizcaya
Manuel Prast 80'	Report

Hipódromo, Madrid
Attendance: 6,000
Referee: (Republic of Ireland) Sidney (Hamilton FC)

Copa del Rey 1907 Winners
Madrid FC
3rd Title
