= Adolfo Álvarez-Buylla =

Spanish footballer

Personal information
- Full name: Adolfo Álvarez-Buylla Lozana
- Date of birth: 28 February 1897
- Place of birth: Oviedo, Asturias, Spain
- Date of death: 1945 (aged 48)
- Position: Defender

Senior career*
Years	Team	Apps	(Gls)
1914–1918	Sport Club Avilesino		
1914–1917	Athletic Club de Madrid		
1917–1919	Racing de Madrid		
1919–1927	Zaragoza CD		

International career
1917	Madrid	2	(0)
Medal record
Madrid
Prince of Asturias Cup
Gold medal – first place	1917 Prince of Asturias Cup	Team
- * Club domestic league appearances and goals

Adolfo Álvarez-Buylla Lozana (28 February 1897 – 1945) was a Spanish footballer who played as a defender for Athletic Madrid, Racing de Madrid and Zaragoza CD. He is the younger of three brothers, Benito, Plácido and Vicente, with the latter two also being footballers.

== Early life ==
Buylla was born in Asturias as the son of (Adolfo A. Buylla, professor of Political Economy and president of the Ateneo de Madrid, and of Carmen Lozana de la Concha. Buylla and his family used to spend the summers in Salinas, where it is known that he and his brothers played football matches with the team from the town of Castrillón.

== Playing career ==
=== Club career ===
Buylla enjoyed his youth playing football, which at the time was a relatively unknown sport in Asturias, being a part of the very first teams in Ávila, such as Sport Club Avilesino, with whom he played between 1914 and 1918, a period that he combined with his participation in several teams in the Spanish capital.

All of the Buylla brothers played for Madrid FC, with each spending three years in the capital due to their legal university studies, and due to their family having settled there. Buylla began his football career in Madrid with Athletic Madrid in 1914, at the age of 17, playing with them for three years until he signed for Racing de Madrid in 1917, helping them win the 1918–19 Centro Championship.

While his older brothers held several important positions in the Spanish government, such as that of consuls and ministers, Adolfo decided instead on the position of military lawyer. His access to a legal-military career took him to Zaragoza, where he settled and where he was even one of the promoters of the Stadium in said town. He went on to play for the city's club Zaragoza CD until 1927, when he retired at the age of 30.

=== International career ===
As a Racing player, Buylla was eligible to play for the Madrid national team, being called-up by them for the 1917 Prince of Asturias Cup, an inter-regional competition organized by the RFEF. He started in two games as Madrid won their first-ever title in the competition, but this almost did not happen as initially Buylla was not even in the radar of the dirigents to be called up for the Madrid team, but because the tournament coincided with the 1917 Copa del Rey Final between Madrid FC and Arenas, which prevented them from having the best players of Madrid FC, thus the "second options" (mainly players of Athletic Madrid and Racing de Madrid) got a chance to prove their worth at the tournament, and they did exactly that by winning what the "first options" had failed to.

== Later life and death ==
In 1936, Buylla was Spanish consul in Marseille. After the Spanish Civil War, he went into exile. In 1944, he arrived in Mexico from Colombia. Buylla died the following year, at the age of 48.

== Honours ==
=== Club ===
Racing de Madrid

- Centro Championship
  - Winners (1): 1918–19

=== International ===
Madrid XI

- Prince of Asturias Cup:
  - Champions (1): 1917
