= 1910 Copa del Rey =

The Copa del Rey 1910 comprised two different competitions held the same year.

Due to disagreements between the reigning champion of the tournament, Club Ciclista de San Sebastián, and some of the clubs invited, in 1910 two parallel competitions were held: an "official", organized by the newly created FECF (Federación Española de Clubs de Football), forerunner of the Royal Spanish Football Federation (Spanish: Real Federación Española de Fútbol, RFEF), in Madrid and an "unofficial", organized by the UECF (Unión Española de Clubs de Football), in San Sebastián. Both are currently recognized as official by the RFEF.

== Copa UECF (Unión Española de Clubs de Football) ==
1910 Copa UECF
8th Copa del Rey

Tournament details
- Country: Spain

Final positions
- Champions: Athletic Bilbao (3rd title)
- Runners-up: Vasconia SC

Tournament statistics
- Matches played: 3
- Goals scored: 5 (1.67 per match)
- Top goal scorer(s): (Spain) Remigio Iza (England) George McGuinness (2 goals each)

The competition started on 19 March, and concluded on 21 March, with the last group stage match. Athletic Bilbao won the tournament for the third time in its history after beating Vasconia SC 1–0 in the decisive match with a goal from Remigio Iza. The tournament is believed to have been the first time Athletic Bilbao wore what became their regular red-and-white striped jersey, having recently imported the first set of kit from England (along with a set for their sister club, later known as Atletico Madrid).

=== Group stage ===
19 March 1910

Athletic Bilbao	2–0	Madrid FC
Remigio Iza; Martyn Veitch

Ondarreta Stadium, San Sebastián
Referee: (France) D. Labat

20 March 1910

Athletic Bilbao	1–0	Vasconia SC
Remigio Iza 56'	Report

Ondarreta Stadium, San Sebastián
Referee: (France) D. Labat

21 March 1910

Vasconia SC	2–0	Madrid FC
George McGuinness 45', 80'	Report

Ondarreta Stadium, San Sebastián
Referee: (France) D. Labat

Teams	Played	Won	Drawn	Lost	GF	GA	Pts
Athletic Bilbao	2	2	0	0	3	0	4
Vasconia SC	2	1	0	1	2	1	2
Madrid FC	2	0	0	2	0	4	0

Copa del Rey 1910 winners (UECF)
Athletic Bilbao
3rd Title

== Copa FECF (Federación Española de Clubs de Football) ==
1910 Copa FECF
9th Copa del Rey

Tournament details
- Country: Spain
- Teams: 3

Final positions
- Champions: FC Barcelona (1st title)
- Runners-up: Español de Madrid

Tournament statistics
- Matches played: 3
- Goals scored: 14 (4.67 per match)
- Top goal scorer: (Spain) Carles Comamala (4 goals)

The competition started on 24 May, and concluded on 26 May, with the last group stage match, in which FC Barcelona lifted the trophy for the first time in its history with two victories over Deportivo la Coruña and Español Madrid, beating the latter in a dramatic 3–2 comeback in which Español netted two early goals thanks to Vicente Buylla, but then Barça fought back in the second half and scored via Charles Wallace, Carles Comamala and Pepe Rodríguez.

=== Group stage ===
24 May 1910

FC Barcelona	5–0	Deportivo
Percy Wallace 2'; Carles Comamala 20'; Romà Forns 60'; Charles Wallace 70'; Pepe Rodríguez 80'	Report

Tiro del Pichón, Madrid
Referee: (Spain) José Manuel Kindelán
25 May 1910

Español de Madrid	1–0	Deportivo
Armando Giralt 85'	Report

Tiro del Pichón, Madrid
Referee: (Spain) Romà Forns (FC Barcelona)
26 May 1910

Español de Madrid	2–3	FC Barcelona
Vicente Buylla 5', 12'	Report	Charles Wallace 58'; Carles Comamala 70'; Pepe Rodríguez 89'

Tiro del Pichón, Madrid
Referee: (Spain) Pablo Lemmel

Teams	Played	Won	Drawn	Lost	GF	GA	Pts
FC Barcelona	2	2	0	0	8	2	4
Español de Madrid	2	1	0	1	5	4	2
Deportivo	2	0	0	2	1	8	0

Copa del Rey 1910 winners (FECF)
FC Barcelona
1st Title
