= Club Ciclista de San Sebastián =

Spanish cycling club

Club Ciclista
- Full name: Club Ciclista de San Sebastián
- Founded: 1909 (football)
- Dissolved: 1909; 117 years ago (merged to form Real Sociedad)
- Ground: Ondarreta Stadium, San Sebastián
- Chairman: ?
- Manager: ?
Home colours

Club Ciclista de San Sebastián was a cycling club based in San Sebastián, Basque Country, Spain. In 1909 the football section won the Copa del Rey. A few months after this victory, the players who had won the tournament founded the club that would later become Real Sociedad.

== History ==
The San Sebastián Cycling Club was founded in February 1907 as a sports club dedicated to the practice of cycling, which had a great following in the city at that time. The main promoter of this hobby was Julián Comet, a French citizen who had settled in the city at the end of the 19th century. Comet was a great lover of cycling and he was the driving force behind the first, but short-lived, velodrome in the city, the Atocha Velodrome, installed in 1906, where the world cycling figures of the time would pass. A year after the club's foundation, in August 1908, the club was already in charge of organizing the Spanish Track Cycling Championship.

== Football section ==
Football was introduced to San Sebastián in the early 1900s by students and workers returning from Britain, and this new sport soon gained a lot of followers in the city and thus, in 1904, the first football club in San Sebastián, the San Sebastián Recreation Club, was founded. In 1907, a conflict between the club's members caused the team to split with several players (such as Alfonso and Miguel Sena, Domingo Arrillaga and Bonifacio Echeverría) leaving the club to create a new team in 1908, and that's how the San Sebastian Football Club was born. The Recreation Club used to hold its matches at Ondarreta Stadium, so San Sebastian FC began using the Atocha Velodrome, belonging to the Cycling Club, as their playing field, and this shared use of the Velodrome was what led to the merger of both companies on 21 September 1908, creating the Ciclista Football Club, with Federico Ferreirós as its first president.

=== 1909 Copa del Rey ===
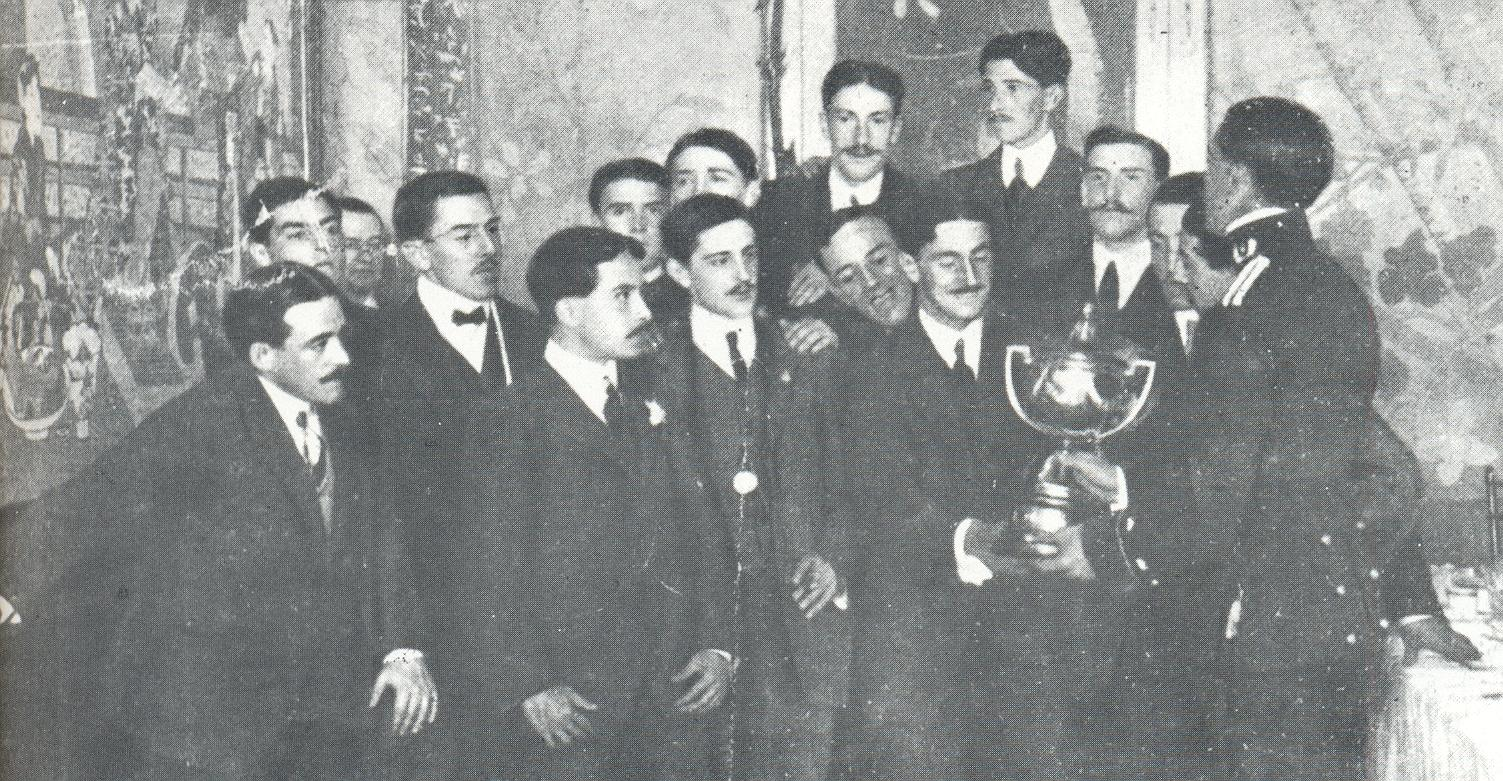
Players from Club Ciclista celebrating with the 1909 Copa del Rey trophy

A streak of wins against regional and foreign rivals encouraged the cyclists to compete in the upcoming Copa del Rey in 1909, but in those times, the teams who had not been legally registered for more than a year could not play official matches, so in order to play in the 1909 Copa del Rey, they borrowed the license from the Club Ciclista de San Sebastián, under whose name they presented themselves in the tournament. And this team excelled all expectations by surprisingly reaching the final after they unexpectedly, but convincingly defeated the powerful Athletic Club in the quarter-finals by a score of 4–2, with a hat-trick from George McGuinness, and then beat Galicia FC 2–0, with both goals also being netted by McGuinness, who was proving to be the star of the tournament. Finally, in the final held at Campo de O'Donnell on 8 April, Club Ciclista beat Español de Madrid 3–1 with yet another goal from McGuinness, who opened the scoring from the penalty spot. Simmons and Miguel Sena also netted a goal each to seal the title. The team that lined-up that day was Pedro Bea, Alfonso Sena, Manuel Arocena, Domingo Arrillaga, Bonifacio Echeverría, José Rodríguez, Miguel Sena, Mariano Lacort, CF Simmons, G. McGuiness and J. Biribén.

== Legacy ==
A few months after this victory, the players who had won the tournament founded the Sociedad de Football (now known as Real Sociedad) on 7 September 1909, definitively disassociating themselves from the Cycling Club. A few years after the foundation of Real Sociedad, in 1913, the Atotxa Stadium was built. For its construction, they had to demolish the velodrome that occupied the place, which had been built a few years earlier after great efforts by the Cycling Club and its president, Julián Comet. Annoyed by the treatment he received from the footballers he had helped a few years earlier, Comet launched a famous curse that was long remembered in San Sebastian: "Real will never be champion".

== Honours ==
- Copa del Rey
  - Winners (1): 1909
