= 1908 Copa del Rey =

6th Copa del Rey

Tournament details
- Country: Spain
- Teams: 2

Final positions
- Champions: Madrid FC (4th title)
- Runners-up: Vigo Sporting

Tournament statistics
- Matches played: 1
- Goals scored: 3 (3 per match)

The Copa del Rey 1908 was the 6th staging of the Copa del Rey, the Spanish football cup competition. It started and ended on 12 April.

Athletic Bilbao refused to enter to protest the behaviour of Madrid supporters at some games of the previous tournament. Other teams invited, like the Catalan champion X Sporting Club, declined the invitation for economic reasons. Ultimately, only two teams were entered: Madrid FC and Real Vigo Sporting.

The tournament was won by Madrid FC, who claimed their fourth Cup title in a row. They beat Vigo Sporting 2–1 in the final thanks to goals from Antonio Neyra and Federico Revuelto.

== Final ==
12 April 1908

Madrid FC	2 – 1	Vigo Sporting
Antonio Neyra 41'; Federico Revuelto (2T)	Report	Adolfo Posada 85'

O'Donnell, Madrid
Attendance: 4,000
Referee: (Spain) José María Ábalo

Copa del Rey 1908 Winners
Madrid FC
4th Title
