= 1904–05 Madrid FC season =

3rd season in existence of Real Madrid CF

Madrid FC
1904–05 season
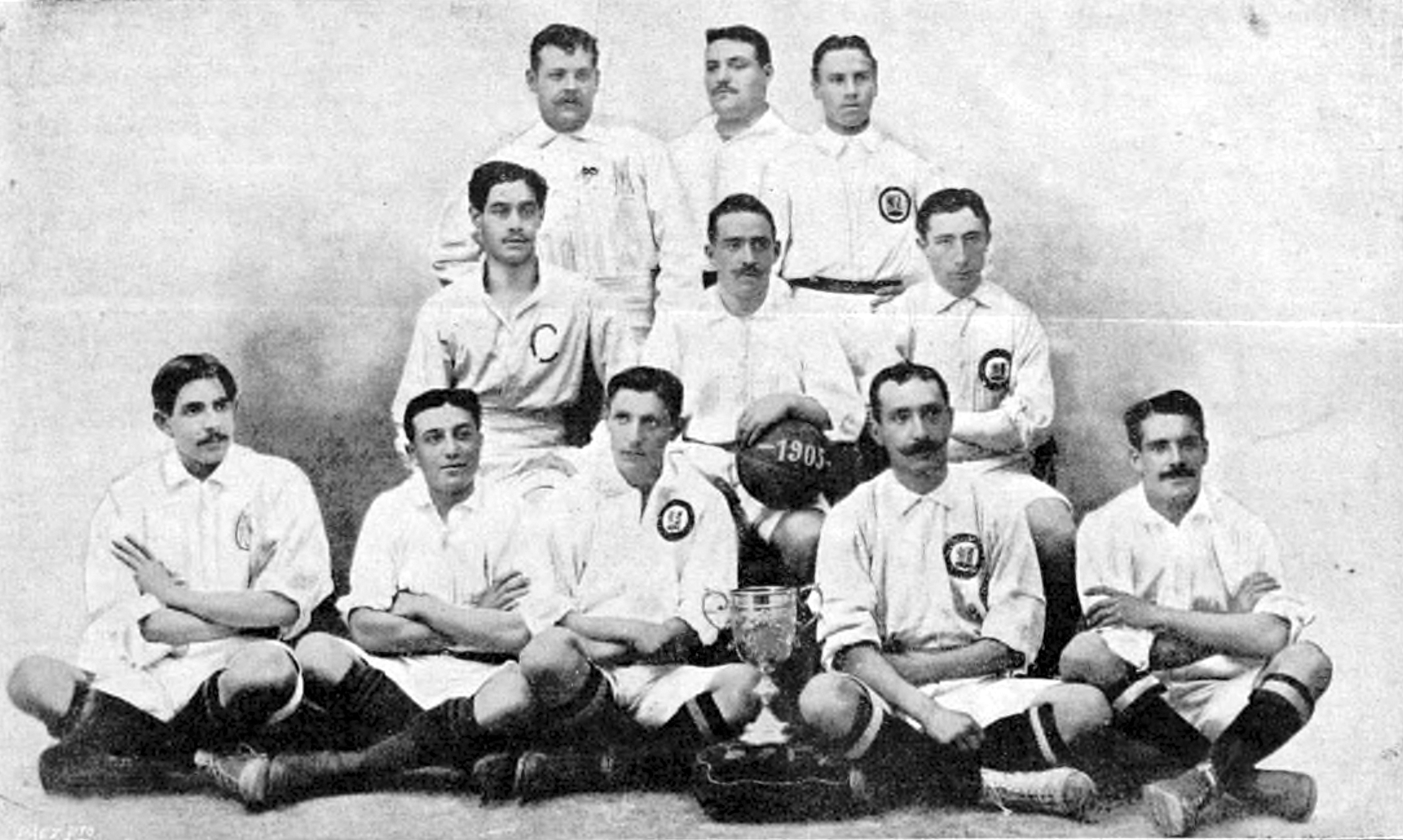
- Madrid FC team with the 1905 Copa del Rey trophy.
- President: Carlos Padrós
- Manager: No manager
- Stadium: No home stadium
- Copa del Rey: Winners
- Madrid Championship (Note: The Campeonato de Madrid (Madrid Championship) was a regional qualifier for the Copa del Rey.): Winners
- Top goalscorer: League: — All: Manuel Prast (2); Antonio Alonso (2)
- Biggest win: Madrid FC 3–0 San Sebastián RC
- Biggest defeat: Undefeated
Home colours	Away colours

The 1904–05 season was Madrid Football Club's 3rd season in existence. The club played some friendly matches against local clubs. They also played in the Campeonato de Madrid (Madrid Championship) and the Copa del Rey.

Madrid FC remained unbeaten throughout the season winning both the Campeonato de Madrid and the Copa del Rey for the first time. The only match the club did not win was a 1–1 draw in a friendly against Athletic Club Sucursal de Madrid. Madrid FC defeated Athletic Bilbao in the Copa del Rey final securing the first official title in the club's history.

== Summary ==
- 13 November: The first ever match between Madrid FC and Atlético Madrid was held.
- 21 May: Real Madrid was a founding member of the Fédération Internationale de Football Association (FIFA)
- 18 April: Madrid FC defeated Athletic Bilbao in the Copa del Rey final thanks to a goal by Manuel Prast. This was the first official title in the history of the club.

== Players ==
Note: Flags indicate national team as defined under FIFA eligibility rules; some limited exceptions apply. Players may hold more than one non-FIFA nationality.

No.	Pos.	Nation	Player
—	GK	ESP	Manuel Alcalde Bahamonde
—	GK	ESP	Leopoldo García Durán
—	GK	ESP	Lafora
—	GK	ESP	Adolfo Meléndez
—	DF	ESP	Telesforo Álvarez
—	DF	ESP	José Berraondo
—	MF	ESP	Eugenio Bisbal
—	MF	ESP	Luciano Lizárraga
—	MF	ESP	Enrique Normand
—	MF	ESP	Manuel Mauricio Yarza
—	MF	ESP	Adolfo Wandosell

No.	Pos.	Nation	Player
—	MF	ESP	Plácido Álvarez-Buylla
—	MF	ESP	Ruete
—	MF	ESP	Arturo Meléndez
—	MF	ESP	Manuel Prast
—	MF	ESP	Leopoldo García Durán
—	MF	ESP	Fabián Cristino Bisbal
—	FW	FRA	Pedro Parages
—	FW	GUA	Federico Revuelto
—	FW	ESP	Joaquín Yarza Simmonds
—	FW	ESP	Antonio Alonso Giménez-Cuenca

== Transfers ==
=== In ===
Pos.	Player	From
DF	(Spain) José Berraondo	(England) Brentford
MF	(Spain) Ruete	
MF	(Spain) Manuel Prast	
MF	(Spain) Fabián Cristino Bisbal	

=== Out ===
Pos.	Player	To
GK	(Ireland) Arthur Johnson	
DF	(Spain) Juan Sevilla	
DF	(Spain) M. Spottorno	
MF	(Spain) José de Góngora	
MF	(Spain) Ángel Barquín	
MF	(Spain) Enrique Varela de Seijas	
MF	(Spain) José Palacios	
MF	Hodans	
FW	(Spain) Miguel de Valdeterrazo	
FW	Mertens	
FW	(Spain) Eugenio Bisbal	

== Friendlies ==
13 November 1904 Friendly	Madrid FC	6–0	Athletic Club Sucursal de Madrid	Av. Plaza de Toros, Madrid
	?	Report

19 February 1905 Friendly	Athletic Club Sucursal de Madrid	0–4	Madrid FC	Retiro, Madrid
		Report	Urquijo; Chulilla; C. Bisbal ?
Note: The match was an evening game, played by the second teams.

28 February 1905 Friendly	Madrid FC	1–1	Athletic Club Sucursal de Madrid	Av. Plaza de Toros, Madrid
	Joaquín Yarza	Report	?	Referee: R. Berraondo

5 March 1905 Friendly	Madrid FC	6–0	Moncloa FC	Av. Plaza de Toros, Madrid
	Urquijo; C. Bisbal; R. Berraondo ? ? ?	Report		Referee: R. Berraondo
Note: The match was contested by the second teams. Moncloa only fielded ten players.

12 March 1905 Friendly	Moncloa FC	2–3	Madrid FC	Moncloa, Madrid
	Arranz; Bueno	Report	García Durán; Berraondo

19 March 1905 Friendly	Madrid FC	3–1	Moncloa FC	Av. Plaza de Toros, Madrid
	Revuelto; Parages ?	Report	?	Referee: Degollada

26 March 1905 Friendly	Madrid FC	3–0	Athletic Club Sucursal de Madrid	Av. Plaza de Toros, Madrid
		Report

== Competitions ==
=== Overview ===
Competition	First match	Last match	Starting round	Final position	Record							
Competition	First match	Last match	Starting round	Final position	Pld	W	D	L	GF	GA	GD	Win %
Campeonato de Madrid	2 April 1905	2 April 1905	Final	Winners	1	1	0	0	2	0	+2	100.00
Copa del Rey	16 April 1905	18 April 1905	First round	Winners	2	2	0	0	4	0	+4	100.00
Total					3	3	0	0	6	0	+6	100.00

Source: Competitions

=== Campeonato de Madrid ===
2 April 1905 Madrid Championship – Final	Madrid FC	2–0	Moncloa FC	Av. Plaza de Toros, Madrid
		Report		Referee: Prado
Note: The match barely lasted thirty-five minutes, as Moncloa players left the field upset with the arbitration of Prado (goalkeeper of Athletic Club Sucursal de Madrid).

=== Copa del Rey ===
16 April 1905 Round 1	Madrid FC	3–0	San Sebastián Recreation Club	Tiro del Pichón, Madrid
	Prast 20'; Alonso 30', (?)			Referee: Prado

18 April 1905 Final	Madrid FC	1–0	Athletic Bilbao	Tiro del Pichón, Madrid
	Prast 70'			Referee: Forster
