= Madrid Association of Foot-ball Clubs =

Football association in Catalonia

- Founded: December 1902
- 29 March 1904
- President: Carlos Padrós (1902–1903) Ceferino Avecilla (1904)

The Madrid Association of Foot-ball Clubs (Spanish: La Asociación Madrileña de Clubs de Foot-ball, AMCF) was a football association responsible for the administration of football in Madrid between 1902 and 1904. It was the first football association founded in the capital. AMCF was one of the most important entities in the amateur beginnings of Spanish football, organizing the first-ever tournament disputed exclusively by Madrid clubs at the end of 1902 as well as the infamous 1904 Copa del Rey, which was notable for its chaotic development and the fact that Athletic Bilbao won the trophy without playing a single game, being this what ultimately led to the federation's demise.

== History ==
=== Origins ===
The association was born at the beginning of December 1902, in parallel to the creation of the Association of Foot-ball Clubs of Barcelona, which was founded on 12 November of the same year. The first board of directors of the Madrid Football Association was formalized shortly after, with Carlos Padrós as its first president and Francisco Hodans as Vice-President, in addition to Francisco de Borbón y de la Torre as secretary and Pedro Velasco as treasurer, with other members including Colmenares, Salló and Oteyza. The association was never officially established since it was never registered in the Civil registry, which is odd given that only eight months prior, the president Padrós had participated in the registration of Madrid FC (now Real Madrid), which means that the reasons for not registering were not because of laziness or ignorance.

=== Concurso de Bandas ===
In December 1902, this entity organized its first-ever tournament, Concurso de Bandas, which is now regarded as the first incarnation of a Madrid Cup since this contest, named after the prize at stake, was the first-ever tournament disputed exclusively by Madrid clubs, featuring five teams from the Spanish capital: Madrid FC, Moderno FC, New Foot-Ball Club (former Sky Football club), Español de Madrid and Club Retiro. The first game of the tournament, which was also the first organized party of the Madrid football association, was held at the Hipódromo de la Castellana on 23 December 1902, and it was a complete success, having the presence of the King of Spain himself, Alfonso XIII, the first time that the king went to a football match, which was disputed by New FC and Madrid FC, the oldest football clubs in the city. According to the chronicles, His Majesty asked Padrós to sit next to him so that he could explain what the rules were. Plaza de Toros Avenue also hosted a few games of this tournament, including the one on Christmas day between Madrid FC and Moderno FC, which ended in a resounding 16–0 win for the former, who went on to win the tournament, thus receiving "the bands for the champion" from the brother of the President of the federation, Juan Padrós.

=== Instability ===
But soon the problems started. On 18 January 1903, just over a month after the creation of the federation, Madrid FC sponsored the organization of a Spanish Championship (Copa del Rey), an action that logically belonged to the newly created federation. This led to a conflict between the two entities, which is odd as Madrid was chaired by Juan Padrós, brother of Carlos, the president of the federation, who resigned from his position shortly after, but his resignation was not accepted by the board. So it was Madrid FC who organized the first Copa del Rey, and the Madrid federation limited itself to organizing the first edition of the regional championship of Madrid. Carlos Padrós ended up presenting his resignation again, this time irrevocably, in December 1903, only one year after the foundation of the Association. The reasons for his resignation are unclear, but it was probably due to the federation's lack of success.

His resignation gave way to a new board of directors which was formalized on 4 January 1904, with Ceferino Avecilla as president and Angel Garrido as vice president, in addition to Arturo Meléndez as secretary, and Pedro de Velasco as treasurer, with other members including Julián Valls, Manuel Mencía and Antonio Neyra. Avecilla combined his position of president of the Madrid federation with the presidency of Español de Madrid, the club that won the 1903–04 Campeonato Regional Centro.

=== 1904 Copa del Rey ===
Already in January, Avecilla announced in the Madrid and Barcelona press the celebration of the 1904 Copa del Rey, which was intended to be contested by the regional champions of Madrid, Bilbao and Catalonia. A few days later, however, Madrid FC once again announced that it would be them who would organize the Copa del Rey, and the 1903 champions, Athletic Club, stood by their side, along with several other Madrid clubs such as Moncloa FC and Iberia FC. A month later, however, Juan Padrós withdrew his will and let the federation organize the national championship, but doing so with just a couple of days away from the tournament, thus leaving little time for the federation, which ended up causing chaos in the development of the tournament. For example, the final was originally scheduled for 26 March, but the inclusion of Moncloa and Iberia in the tournament at the last minute necessitated an extra qualifying game, which delayed the final.

The tournament started on 13 March 1904, and the first problems arose on 19 March. Avecilla's Español and Padrós's Madrid faced each other in the semi-finals of the Madrid Qualifying Tournament (the qualification contest for the 1904 Copa del Rey) and it ended in a dramatic 5–5 draw. The captains of both teams agreed not to play extra-time, but failed to reach an agreement on when they should replay the match. Español wanted to play the next day, but Madrid refused, citing the rules of the tournament which stated that a replay could not be played less than 48 hours after the previous game. The next day Club Español went to replay the match, but Madrid did not appear. The Madrid federation, whose president Ceferino Avecilla happened to be president of Club Español as well, ruled in favor of Español, and they were declared winners of the match eliminating Madrid FC from the competition.

On 27 March, Español faced Moncloa in the final of the Qualifying Tournament, and Español were winning 1–0 when by chance their defender Alfonso Hermúa was injured. He was diagnosed with a broken tibia and fibula, and thus, the referee decided to suspend the match, at which point Español claimed the victory. During a meeting of the Madrid Association of Foot-ball Clubs, the president of the organization proposed to accept the claim, but as he was the chairman of the claimant club his proposal was rejected. To resolve the conflict, a lottery was held, which favored Español, and named them as finalists. But this team had not won the regional heats: they had tied one game and had not completed the other, which led Athletic to file a complaint. Faced with this problem and unable to quickly solve the case, coupled with the rush of players from the Basque club to return to their occupations, the Madrid Association decided to award the cup to Athletic as defending champions, thus ending the 1904 Cup in controversy as Español de Madrid were unable to participate in the final, meaning Athletic Club were declared the champions.

=== Decline and Collapse ===
Avecilla only lasted three months at the helm of the Madrid federation, because the federation ceased to exist after the controversial and chaotic development of the 1904 Copa del Rey. All the blame for the chaotic organization of the 1904 cup was laid on him, however, he was the victim of a set of intrigues and snares. The 1904 cup was boycotted by Madrid FC of Padrós, helped by Athletic Club, to put an end to the federation. This would not be the last time these two clubs organized a similar boycott to a federation, because six years later, in 1910, they did something very similar to the newly-established Federación Española de Clubs de Football (the forerunner for the Spanish Football Federation), on this occasion with the help of the current national champion, Club Ciclista de San Sebastián. The three of them decided to organize their own Copa del Rey, which caused the 1910 Copa del Rey to have two parallel rival cup competitions: an "official", organized by the newly created FECF, won by Barcelona, and an "unofficial", organized by the UECF (Unión Española de Clubes de Fútbol), won by Athletic. Both tournaments are now currently recognized as official by the RFEF.

Avecilla presented his resignation on 24 March, and although it was not accepted by the board, the federation ceased to exist five days later, on 29 March 1904. Months later Avecilla returned to send a letter of resignation, but now merely a formality because the federation had already disappeared.

== Presidents ==
- December 1902–December 1903: Carlos Padrós
- 4 January 1904–29 March 1904: Ceferino Avecilla

== See also ==
- 1904 Copa del Rey
