= Miguel de Valdeterrazo =

Spanish footballer

Personal information
- Full name: Luis Romero de Tejada Ibarreta
- Date of birth: 27 January 1881
- Place of birth: Madrid, Spain
- Date of death: 24 June 1928 (aged 47)
- Position: Forward

Senior career*
Years	Team	Apps	(Gls)
1902	New Foot-Ball Club		
1902	Internacional Foot-ball Club		
1902–1903	Madrid FC		
1903–1904	Athletic de Madrid		
1904–1905	Atlético Club		
- * Club domestic league appearances and goals

Luis Romero de Tejada Ibarreta (27 January 1881 – 24 June 1928 (Note: Other sources state that he was born in Badajoz on 19 October 1881 as Luis Cuadrado y Romero de Tejada.)), better known as Miguel de Valdeterrazo, was a Spanish footballer who played as a forward for Madrid FC and Atlético Club. Although he rarely played for the, he did start for Madrid FC in the 1903 Copa del Rey final, which they lost to Athletic Bilbao, and then started for Athletic in the 1905 Copa del Rey final, which they lost to Madrid FC. He was also a co-founder of Atlético Madrid in 1903.

== Playing career ==
=== New FC ===
Born in Madrid, Tejada began his football career at New Foot-Ball Club, one of the first clubs in the capital. Together with Eugenio Bisbal, Fernando Valcárcel, and Manuel Vallarino, he was a member of the squad that played in the first national tournament played in Spain, the Copa de la Coronación. Although he did not play in a preparatory friendly match between New and Madrid FC, Tejada was nonetheless selected as a starter in the semifinals against Club Vizcaya (a combination of players from Athletic Club and Bilbao FC), in which New was humiliated as they got knocked-out by a resounding 1–8. He then only played a further two matches for New, both against Madrid FC, the second of which at the Concurso de Bandas on 23 December 1902, which ended in another resounding loss, this time by 2–9.

=== Internacional FC ===
After the poor sporting results experienced, chaos settled within the entity, and as a result of the disagreements among its members, many of them, including Tejada, decided to leave the club to found a new one, Internacional Foot-ball Club, in January 1903. He appeared on the club's first board of directors as a member alongside Angel Garrido and Eugenio Vallarino, the brother of Manuel, who had joined Madrid FC. Just three months after being founded, however, Internacional FC was suffering from a lack of players, so in order to survive, they decided to accept an agreement proposed by the directors of Madrid FC, Juan and Carlos Padrós, of merging the two clubs, and so, in April 1903, they were absorbed by Madrid FC. These absorptions or mergers between clubs were common at the time, as was the departure of players from one club to form another.

=== Madrid FC ===
Some of the Internacional FC associates became members of the board of directors of Madrid FC, such as Eugenio Bisbal, Pío Wandosell, and Tejada, with the former two even filling management positions, while Tejada was simply named a vocal alongside Darío Arana, Armando Giralt, and Enrique Normand.

Together with Pedro Parages, the Giralt brothers (José, Armando, Mario) and Antonio Neyra, Tejada was a member of Madrid FC's first-ever complete season, in 1902–03. In his first season at the club, he only played three matches, both under the name of Miguel de Valdeterrazo, making his debut on 24 February 1903, when he was still at Internacional FC, in a friendly against RCD Espanyol (then known as Club Español), which ended in a goalless draw. His next two appearances, however, came in April at the 1903 Copa del Rey, helping his side beat RCD Espanyol to reach the first-ever Copa del Rey final, in which he rose to the occasion by scoring the opening goal, the first in the history of Spanish cup finals, although in the end, it proved to be insufficient as Bilbao ended up winning 3–2.

In the following season, Valdeterrazo played four matches, three at the 1903–04 Campeonato de Madrid, and then his fourth in the semifinals of the Madrid qualifying tournament for the 1904 Copa del Rey, which ended in a 5–5 draw, but then Madrid did not appear for the replay and was disqualified.

Over the years, several doubts about the true identity of Marquis of Valdeterrazo arose, with the investigations about it remaining inconclusive and open to debate by historians. For instance, the Spanish journalist Bernardo de Salazar wrote on the website of the sports newspaper Diario AS that: "The Marquis of Valdeterrazo represents for me an indecipherable enigma. According to the current marquis of said title, none of his predecessors had anything to do with football. In those times it is written that Valdeterrazo was Luis Romero de Tejada, but no one with this name carried a noble title. Was it used inappropriately? Was a chronicler wrong and the others have copied him, and thus spreading an error? I have no answer."

=== Founding Athletic de Madrid ===
Despite some encouraging first steps with the white club, Tejada was one of the enthusiastic youngsters who left just a few months later to found a club that would represent Athletic Club de Bilbao in the capital, Athletic Madrid, on 26 April 1903. He appeared on the club's second board of directors as a vocal alongside Ricardo de Gondra, José Toda, and Darío Arana, under the presidency of Eduardo de Acha.

=== Athletic Bilbao ===
Three Athletic players: Javier Prado, Tomás Murga, and Valdetarrazo, played for Athletic Bilbao in the final of the 1906 Copa del Rey on 10 April, which ended in a 0–1 loss to his former club Madrid FC, thanks to a late goal from Manuel Prast. This happened because Athletic Madrid, as a 'branch' of Athletic Bilbao, could not participate in the Copa del Rey.

== Personal life ==
Tejada married Rafaela Colorado y Velasco, and the couple had three children Julia, Antonio, and Luis Cuadrado Colorado. He died on 24 June 1928, at the age of 47.

== Honours ==
Madrid FC

- Campeonato de Madrid:
  - Champions (1): 1903–04
- Copa del Rey:
  - Runner-up (1): 1903

Athletic Bilbao

- Copa del Rey:
  - Runner-up (1): 1905

== See also ==
- List of Real Madrid CF players
