= Hermenegildo García (footballer) =

Spanish footballer and artist

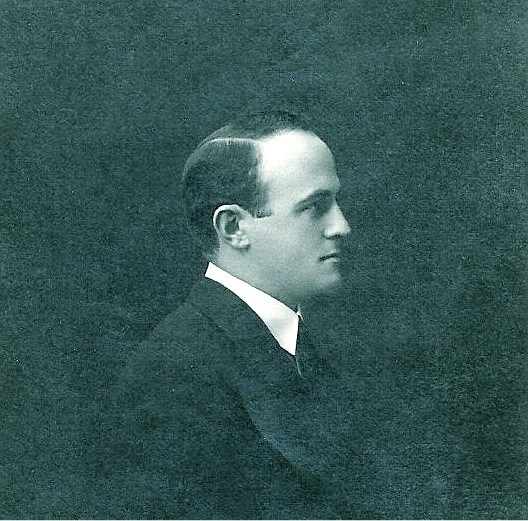
- Hermenegildo García
- Born: Hermenegildo García Verde; 27 October 1884; Buenos Aires, Argentina
- Died: 18 April 1965 (aged 80); Seville, Andalusia, Spain
- Resting place: Soria cemetery
- Citizenship: Argentine and Spanish
- Occupations: Athlete; Artist
- Known for: Player of Athletic Bilbao
Association football career
Senior career*
Years	Team	Apps	(Gls)
1903–1906	Athletic Club		
1906–1907	Club Vizcaya		
1907–1909	Athletic Club		
- Atlético Madrid
- * Club domestic league appearances and goals

Hermenegildo García Verde (27 October 1884 – 18 April 1965) was a Spanish-Argentine artist and footballer who played as a midfielder for Spanish club Athletic Bilbao. He was one of the most important footballers in the amateur beginnings of Athletic Bilbao, being pivotal in the club's three back-to-back Copa del Rey finals between 1905 and 1907. In addition to being an artist and footballer, he also practiced other sports such as handball, mountaineering or swimming, and he was the first athlete to swim across the Laguna Negra de Urbión.

== Early life ==
Garcia was born into a deeply Catholic family. His father, Hermenegildo García Sanz (1850–1929), was an indiano linked to the Integrist Party, and one of the supporters of the newspaper El Siglo Futuro who stood out for his charitable works, founding three schools for the poor in the Province of Soria. A defender of the traditional theses, he provided his children, including his namesake, with a strict Christian education. As a child, he moved with his family from Argentina to Spain, where they first lived in Bilbao, although they spent every summer and part of the autumn in Soria and Derroñadas, the hometown of his father.

== Footballing career ==
Hermenegildo was a pioneer in some sports activities and artistic manifestations in the province of Soria, such as football, playing for Athletic Club of Bilbao between 1903 and 1909. In the 1904 Copa del Rey Final, Athletic were declared winners after their opponents, Club Español de Madrid, failed to turn up. He was then a pivotal player in the Athletic side that reached the final of the Copa del Rey three consecutive seasons (1905 to 1907), however, they all ended in losses at the hands of Madrid FC. In 1907, the best players from Athletic and Unión Vizcaino came together to form Bizcaya, which was specially created to take part in the 1907 Copa del Rey, and García was elected into the team's 11, featuring alongside the likes of Juan Arzuaga, the Sena brothers (Miguel and Alfonso) and José Irízar, and he netted two goals in the tournament to help his side reach the final, which ended in a loss to Madrid thanks to a late goal from Manuel Prast.

When he moved to spend the winters in Madrid, he was the founder, midfielder, and captain of Atlético Madrid, a team in which he stood out as one of the best players. In addition to being a footballer, he also practiced other sports such as handball, mountaineering or swimming, and he was the first athlete to swim across the Laguna Negra de Urbión.

== Later life ==
In Madrid, he was a student of Eduardo Chicharro and a classmate and friend of the Mexican Diego Rivera. He was also a friend of Gustavo de Maeztu and collaborated with Joaquín Sorolla so that he could paint some models from Soria.

Hermenegildo García Verde was the true transcript of his father, Don Hermenegildo García Sanz, the patriarch and founder of so many great works.

— Manuel Fal Conde

Since his family still had businesses and farms in Argentina, Garcia returned to Buenos Aires in 1916. During the trip, he met José Ortega Munilla and José Ortega y Gasset, to whom he showed his highlight reel of the Soria colony and together they visited Patagonia. Hermenegildo and the Ortegas would develop a close friendship, despite their ideological differences. As a result of this relationship, Ortega Munilla would later publish the book of stories for children Los tres sorianitos (1922).

García died in Seville in 1965, at the age of 80, being buried in the family pantheon of the Soria cemetery.

== Honours ==
Athletic Bilbao

- Copa del Rey:
  - Winner (1): 1904
  - Runner-up (3): 1905, 1906 and 1907 (Note: as Club Bizcaya.)
