= Ceferino Avecilla =

Spanish writer, dramatist, sports journalist and football executive

Ceferino Rodríguez
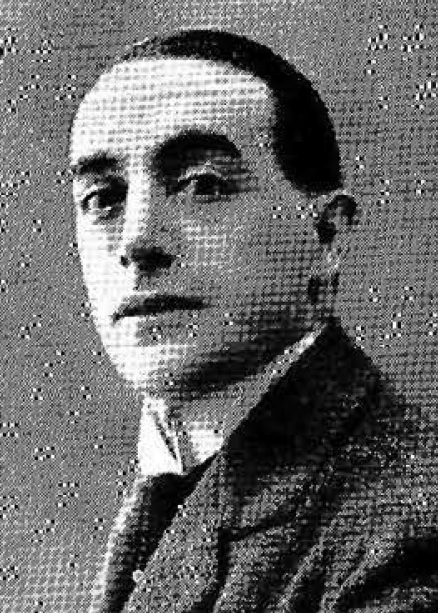
- Ceferino R. Avecilla in 1915
- Born: Ceferino Rodríguez Avecilla; 14 December 1880; Valladolid, Spain
- Died: 1956 (aged 76); Mexico City, Mexico
- Citizenship: Spanish
- Occupations: Journalist; Writer
- Known for: President of Madrid Association of Foot-ball Clubs and Español de Madrid

Español de Madrid
- In office November 1903 – Summer 1904
- Preceded by: Manuel Méndez

2nd President of the Madrid Association of Foot-ball Clubs
- In office 4 January 1904 – 29 March 1904
- Preceded by: Carlos Padrós

Ceferino Rodríguez Alonso de Avecilla (14 December 1880 – 1956) was a Spanish writer, dramatist, sports journalist and football executive. A prolific and restless journalist, Avecilla wrote countless chronicles about the most important issues of his time, as well as several novels and plays. He was an enthusiastic sportsman in his youth, being the founder of the magazines Revista de Sport (1903), Mundo Sportivo (1903) and Gaceta del Sport (1904), and he is especially recognized for having been president of the Madrid Association of Foot-ball Clubs (1904), the first football federation in the capital. In addition to his journalistic, literature, and football work, he was also a lawyer.

A man of strong communist convictions, he was one of those responsible for the General Society of Authors and Publishers during the Spanish Civil War, after which he had to go into exile in Mexico.

== Early and personal life ==
Avecilla was born in Valladolid as the grandson of Don Ceferino Avecilla González, the senator for Lleida (1881–82) and Soria (1887–88) who died in 1888. His family was wealthy, owned mining companies, and was well into Spanish politics. Before turning twenty, Avecilla married Carmen Cuesta López de la Rosa, who would widow him in 1941.

== Journalistic career ==
Avecilla began to write in his early adolescence, publishing his first text in 1896, an article about Cycling. His work as a journalist began in 1903, in the Diario Universal of Madrid, from where he went on to La Tribuna, La Libertad and Informaciones. His work as a journalist was incessant and restless. Between 1903 and 1904 he founded and directed three sports magazines: Revista de Sport (1903), Mundo Sportivo (1903), and Gaceta del Sport (1904), in addition to collaborating as a sports chronicler in the Madrid newspaper Diario Universal, in which he signed his articles under the pseudonym F. Bowden. Mundo Sportivo served as a model for El Mundo Deportivo that was founded in Barcelona in 1906.

== Footballing career ==
=== Becoming president of a club and an association ===
In his journalistic career, Avecilla stood out for his prominent role in firmly promoting sports activity, and because of this, in 1903, he joined Madrid FC's board against the will of then-president Juan Padrós. This conflict caused Avecilla to leave the club in October 1903, along with several Madrid players such as the Giralt brothers (Mario, José and Armando) and Antonio Neyra who had also decided to leave, and together, they refounded a recently dissolved club, the Español de Madrid, and Avecilla become the club's second president after replacing Manuel Méndez, who presided over the entity for just a few days. Under his presidency, Español de Madrid won the 1903–04 Regional Championship of Madrid.

Two months later, on 4 January 1904, Avecilla was elected president of the Madrid Association of Foot-ball Clubs, replacing Carlos Padrós (Juan's brother), who gave up his position due to having been elected president of Madrid FC. Avecilla had been one of Carlos's main collaborators during his year as president, giving a house that he owned to hold the meetings of the Association, and even placing two of the sports magazines that he owned at the service of Carlos Padrós so that he could publish all the official documents of the Madrid Association of Foot-ball Clubs.

=== 1904 Copa del Rey ===
Just a few days after becoming the president of the Association, Avecilla announced in the Madrid and Barcelona press the celebration of the 1904 Copa del Rey, which was intended to be contested by the regional champions of Madrid, Bilbao and Catalonia. Shortly after, however, Madrid FC announced that it would be them who would organize the Copa del Rey, and the 1903 champions, Athletic Club, stood by their side, along with several other Madrid clubs such as Moncloa FC and Iberia FC. A month later, however, Juan Padrós withdrew his will and let the federation organize the national championship, but doing so with just a couple of days away from the tournament, thus leaving little time for the federation to readjust its scheme and schedule, which ended up causing chaos in the development of the tournament.

On 19 March, Avecilla's Español and Padrós's Madrid faced each other in the semifinals of the Madrid Qualifying Tournament (the qualification contest for the 1904 Copa del Rey) and it ended in a dramatic 5–5 draw. Español wanted to play the replay in the next day, but Madrid refused, citing the rules of the tournament which stated that a replay could not be played less than 48 hours after the previous game. Nonetheless, Español de Madrid went to replay the match on the next day, but Madrid did not appear. The Madrid federation, whose president Ceferino Avecilla happened to be president of Español de Madrid as well, ruled in favor of Español, and they were declared winners of the match, thus eliminating the Padrós's Madrid FC from the competition. The tournament ended in further controversy when Español de Madrid was unable to participate in the final, meaning Athletic Club were declared the champions. This caused a terrible journalistic controversy between the Madrid and Bilbao press, fueled by the famous Bowden, but the Basques knew that Bowden was the pseudonym that Avecilla used when he was a sports reporter, so they paid no attention to it.

Avecilla only lasted three months at the helm of the Madrid Federation, because the federation ceased to exist after the controversial and chaotic development of the 1904 Copa del Rey, for which all the blame was laid on him, when actually, he was the victim of a set of intrigues and snares, as the cup was boycotted by Padrós's Madrid FC to put an end to the federation, so it could be them the ones to organize the tournaments. Avecilla presented his resignation on 24 March, and although it was not accepted by the board, the federation ceased to exist five days later, on 29 March 1904. Months later Avecilla returned to send a letter of resignation, but now merely a formality because the federation had already disappeared. After the summer of 1904, Avecilla also concluded his mandate with Español de Madrid, leaving the club orphaned in its management despite being the current champion from Madrid and having the Giralt brothers. Avecilla's experience in football must have been highly unpleasant, since he abandoned sports forever to focus on his journalistic and literary activity.

== Writing career ==
Avecilla is the author of the novels Los crepúsculos (1906), Rincón de humbles (1908), Margot quiere ser honrada (1922) and La amaba locamente (1925), but he found greater professional success through theater. His first play Silencio, was premiered in 1913 at the Colegio Imperial de Madrid, and before 1922 he had staged almost a dozen works, including Los camino de Roma (1917), El enemigo malo, Tupi-Palace, Su majestad and El estudiante de Salamanca.

== Later life ==
His communist ideology made him have an active political activity during the republican years, to the point of being forced to take refuge twice in Paris. Avecilla was one of those responsible for the General Society of Authors and Publishers during the Spanish Civil War, after which he had to go into exile in Mexico, after having been imprisoned at the end of the Civil War. He arrived in Mexico on 22 May 1942, where he continued his active journalistic and literary career, collaborating in various magazines, in which he wrote theater and film reviews. Four years after his arrival, he premiered the play La condemned (1946), which he wrote during his time in prison.

In 1947, Avecilla won the first prize in the Theatrical and Lyrical Art Contest organized in France by the Spanish Libertarian Movement with the work Que en España empieza a amanecer. After this award, little is known about his life, and the exact date of his death is unknown. It is believed that he died in 1956.
