= Eugenio Bisbal =

Spanish footballer

Personal information
- Full name: Eugenio Bisbal López-Brea
- Date of birth: 27 January 1881
- Place of birth: Madrid, Spain
- Date of death: Unknown
- Position: Midfielder

Senior career*
Years	Team	Apps	(Gls)
1902	New Foot-Ball Club		
1902	Internacional Foot-ball Club		
1904–1905	Madrid FC		
- * Club domestic league appearances and goals

Eugenio Bisbal López-Brea (2 December 1882 – Unknown) was a Spanish footballer who played as a midfielder for Madrid FC, with whom he won the 1905 Copa del Rey.

== Playing career ==
=== New FC ===
Born in Madrid, Bisbal began his football career at New Foot-Ball Club, one of the first clubs in the capital. In early 1902, New organized a series of matches at Tiro del Pichón between the club's members as part of New's build-up for the upcoming Copa de la Coronación, the very first national tournament played in Spain, and Bisbal played in three of them, including one alongside his younger brother Fabián Cristino on 6 April, which was his brother's 15th birthday. On 2 May, he started in a preparatory friendly match between New and Madrid FC, the latter's very first match against another team.

Together with Miguel de Valdeterrazo, Fernando Valcárcel, and Manuel Vallarino, Bisbal was then a member of the New squad that played in the Copa de la Coronación, which ended in a resounding 1–8 loss in the semifinals of the tournament to Club Vizcaya (a combination of players from Athletic Club and Bilbao FC). He then only played a further two matches for New, both against Madrid FC, the second of which at the Concurso de Bandas on 23 December 1902, which ended in another resounding loss, this time by 2–9.

=== Internacional FC ===
After the poor sporting results experienced, chaos settled within the entity, and as a result of the disagreements among its members, many of them, including Bisbal, decided to leave the club to found a new one, Internacional Foot-ball Club, in January 1903. He appeared on the club's first board of directors as a secretary. On 8 February, Bisbal started for Internacional alongside his younger brother in a friendly match against Madrid FC, which ended in a 0–4 loss. Just three months after being founded, Internacional FC was suffering from a lack of players, so in order to survive, they decided to accept an agreement proposed by the directors of Madrid FC, Juan and Carlos Padrós, of merging the two clubs, and so, in April 1903, they were absorbed by Madrid FC.

=== Madrid FC ===
Some of the Internacional FC associates became members of the board of directors of Madrid FC, such as Valdeterrazo, Pío Wandosell, and Bisbal, who was once again named as the secretary, this time of Madrid FC; Federico Revuelto held the vice-secretary.

In the 1902–03 season, Bisbal only played one match for the Madrid first team, a friendly against Moncloa FC on 26 April 1903, playing alongside his younger brother in a 4–1 win. Bisbal went on to become a regular for the first team and won the Copa del Rey in 1905, starting in the final against Athletic Bilbao, which ended in a 1–0 victory.

== Refereeing career ==
On 11 August 1902, Bisbal, who at the time still was a New player, made his debut as a referee when he oversaw a match between Madrid FC and Moncloa FC during the festivities at El Escorial, which ended in a thrilling 6–5 score favourable to Madrid, who thus won two ceramic plates, the club's very first trophy.

== Later life ==
In 1910, Bisbal together with Juan Vassallo, created a map for the city of Madrid for Luciano Delage Villegas, a Spanish architect based in Madrid. The map depicts the city from the Lago de Patinar to the Colonia Oriental and from the Asilo de la Paloma to Termino de Villaverde. Bisbal and Vassallo sought to make a highly detailed, with the city divided into ten districts, each of which shaded a different color to allow for easy differentiation. Buildings throughout the city are illustrated and colored red, making them stand out against the rest of the color. Schools, hospitals, government buildings, churches, and train stations are all identified.

== Honours ==
Madrid FC

- Campeonato de Madrid:
  - Champions (1): 1904–05
- Copa del Rey:
  - Champions (1): 1905

== See also ==
- List of Real Madrid CF players
