= Ricardo de Gondra =

Spanish football executive (1885–1951)

3rd President of Atlético Madrid
- In office 1907–1909
- Preceded by: Eduardo de Acha
- Succeeded by: Ramón de Cárdenas

Personal details
- Born: 12 March 1885 Bilbao, Biscay, Spain
- Died: 7 April 1951 (aged 66) Unknown
Association football career
- Full name: Ricardo de Gondra Lazurtegui
- Birth name: Ricardo de Gondra y Lazurtegui
- Position: Goalkeeper
Senior career*
Years	Team	Apps	(Gls)
1904–1908	Athletic de Madrid	0	(0)
- * Club domestic league appearances and goals

Ricardo de Gondra Lazurtegui (12 March 1885 – 7 April 1951) was a Spanish mining engineer who is best known for being the third president of Atlético Madrid between 1907 and 1909. He also worked briefly as a referee.

== Early life and education ==
De Gondra was born on 12 March 1885 in Bilbao, as the son of Ciriaco Gondra Robles (1857–?), a prominent civil activist, and Asunción Lazurtegui González (1863–?). He was the eldest of 8 other children, Leonor (1886–?), Pedro (1888–?), María Isabel (1891–?), Joaquín (1892–?), José María (1894–?), María Carmen (1895–?), Fernando (1897–1989), and Julio Gondra Lazurtegui. He was enrolled in the faculty of mining engineering in Madrid in 1903.

== Sporting career ==
=== Founding Athletic de Madrid ===
De Gondra was an entry-level student at the Escuela Superior de Minas, when on 26 April 1903, he was a member of the group of students from that school led by Eduardo de Acha, who met the representatives of Athletic Club (of Bilbao), who had just won the 1903 Copa del Rey final, to request permission to create the club's Madrid branch, Athletic Madrid, an idea that was very well received, and thus that club was born.

Despite the insistence of the rest of the founders to elect Acha as the president, Gondra staunchly defended the appointment of Enrique Allende as president, stating that Allende, in addition to being from Bilbao living in Madrid, had a solvent economic situation and could be the best promoter in the birth of the entity. Gondra's arguments convinced many, so Allende became the first-ever president of Athletic Madrid; however, he did not meet the expectations that were held of him, so Gondra then pushed for his replacement in favor of Eduardo de Acha. The new board of directors was subsequently elected and de Gondra was named as a vocal alongside José Toda, Luis Romero de Tejada, and Darío de Arana.

=== Delegate, player, and referee ===
De Gondra was Atlético's representative when Carlos Padrós summoned the Madrid clubs to officially establish the Campeonato de Madrid in 1903. When the results of the inaugural edition of the Campeonato Regional de Madrid in 1906–07 were suspended due to a breach of several norms, de Gondra was once again Atlético's representative in a meeting between the delegates of the Madrid clubs to agree to a new draft of regulations that would avoid controversies. However, this meeting was suspended by the organizer Carlos Padrós, claiming that it would be impossible to reach an agreement with the delegates of the different clubs.

From 1904 to 1909, de Gondra was also the team's second goalkeeper, but he never got to play a single game for the first team. He did, however, start in a match between the third teams of Athletic Madrid and Real Madrid CF (then known as Madrid FC) on 26 February 1905, which ended in a 1–1 draw.

De Gondra also worked briefly as a referee in 1906 and 1907, with the highlight being a match between Vigo FC and Madrid FC in the 1907 Copa del Rey on 25 March, which ended in a 3–1 win to the latter.

=== Presidency of Atlético Madrid ===
On 21 February 1907, de Gondra was elected the third president in the history of the Athletic club, a position he held for two years until 1909, the year in which, upon completing his studies, he abandoned the presidency to move to Bilbao to work as a mining engineer; he was replaced by Ramón de Cárdenas.

During his tenure, de Gondra had to deal with the needs of a club that, on the one hand, seeks to consolidate and, on the other hand, must continue to honor its situation as a Bilbao 'branch'. Between March and November 1903, Atlético did not play a single football match, living in the shadow of Madrid FC, which accused President Ricardo de Gondra opted to depend excessively on Athletic Bilbao. Gondra had to prepare the ground for the club to be officially recognized, although, in the end, it was others who had to lead the growth.

== Later life ==
On 8 August 1931, de Gondra was appointed alongside Evencio Cortina as one of two new councilors to the council of the Spanish multinational construction and civil engineering company, OHL, which had suffered several losses due to casualties, such as the death due to natural causes of Francisco de Ussía y Cubas, a founding partner of the company, on 8 July 1931, and later the murder of Marcelino Oreja Elósegui, secretary of the Board of Directors, in 1934.

In the last reunion of the Board of Directors of OHL before the start of the Spanish Civil War, which was held on 25 April 1936, de Gondra was appointed as the vice president of the company at the proposal of José de Aresti, filling the position vacant due to the death of Evencio Cortina. During the Civil War, Gondra reported that the Management Committee had met periodically and just to summarize the agreements made in the minutes drawn up for this purpose.

== Personal life and death ==
De Gondra married María Mercedes Lazurtegui Jordán de Urríes (1890–1967). He died on 7 April 1951, at the age of 66, thus ending his 20-year-old stay as a member of OHL's board of directors. The vacancy left by de Gondra was then filled by Carlos Anabitarte Romero.
