= Pío Wandosell =

Pío Wandosell may refer to:

- Pío Wandosell (businessman) (1847–1920), Spanish businessman and politician
- Pío Wandosell (footballer) (1881–1907), Spanish footballer and son of the above
