= Leopoldo García Durán =

Spanish lawyer, footballer, sports leader, and politician

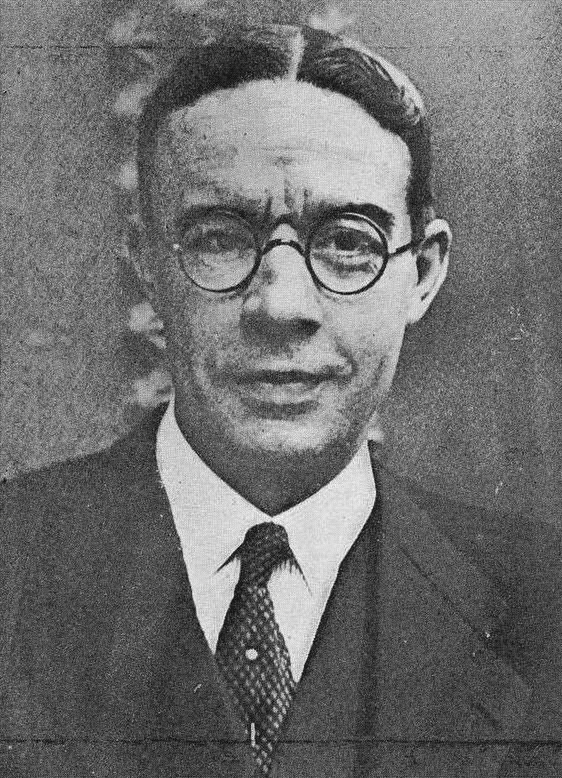
- Leopoldo García in 1933
- Born: Leopoldo García-Durán Parages Golmar; 15 November 1882; As Neves, Galicia, Spain
- Died: 16 April 1966 (aged 83); Madrid, Spain
- Citizenship: Spanish
- Occupations: Lawyer; Footballer; Sports leader; Politician
- Known for: 8th president of the Spanish Football Federation
Association football career
- Position: Midfielder
Senior career*
Years	Team	Apps	(Gls)
1902–1909	Madrid FC		
8th president of the RFEF
In office 1931–1936
Preceded by	Pedro Díez de Rivera
Succeeded by	Julián Troncoso
1st president of UECF
In office December 1912 – 5 February 1914
- * Club domestic league appearances and goals

Leopoldo García-Durán Parages Golmar (15 November 1882 – 16 April 1966) was a Spanish lawyer, sports leader, and politician who served as a Deputy of Spain during the restoration and as the 8th president of the Spanish Football Federation between 1931 and 1936. He also played football in his youth as a midfielder for Madrid FC.

== Early life and education ==
Leopoldo García Durán was born in As Neves, Galicia, on 15 November 1882, as the son of Manuel García Golmar, a merchant and politician. He studied high school at the Escolapios school in Celanova and then studied law at the Central University of Madrid. He worked in the office of Gabino Bugallal and was appointed public prosecutor of the Madrid Court.

== Footballing career ==
While he was studying in the capital, García Durán joined the ranks of Madrid FC as a midfielder, being part of some of the first starting elevens in the club's history. For instance, on 16 May 1902, he started for Madrid in the Copa de la Gran Peña, the consolation trophy of the 1902 Copa de la Coronación, helping his side claim its first-ever piece of silverware following a 3–2 win over RCD Espanyol. In the club's first-ever complete season, in 1902–03, he played in three friendly matches between February and April 1903.

On 12 March 1905, García Durán scored his first goal for the club in a 3–2 victory over Moncloa FC, again in a friendly. In the following month, on 16 April 1905, he finally made his competitive debut for Madrid, the opening match of the 1905 Copa del Rey, helping his side to a 3–0 victory over San Sebastián Recreation Club, but he did not feature in the final against Athletic Bilbao, which Madrid won 1–0. He can be traced in the first elevens of the white team until 1909, when he played in the first three matches of the 1909 Centro regional championship, winning his last one against Sociedad Gimnástica 4–2.

== Politic career ==
After football came politics, and on six occasions García Durán was elected deputy in the Cortes as a member of the Conservative Party. The first time, held on 8 March 1914, he was elected for Alicante, and in the next five times, he was deputy for the district of O Carballiño in the province of Ourense in the elections of 1916, 1918, 1919, 1920, and 1923. In his 1920 election, he got 2,091 votes to the 2,468 of José Calvo Sotelo, who thus contested and protested since García Durán's proclamation was "maintained with an incomplete... and imperfect scrutiny... and with violation of the criteria repeatedly established by the Supreme Court". On 4 April 1922 he was appointed director general of prisons, a position in which he remained until December 11 of that year. He held many other public positions, including that of general inspector of the Stamp. He was part of the board of directors of Alicante's Strategic and Secondary Railways.

== Sporting career ==
He alternated his professional and political activities with his sports interest. In 1931, García Durán was appointed as the 8th president of the Spanish Football Federation, a position that he held until 1936, when he resigned following the victory of the Popular Front; he was replaced with Julián Troncoso. Under his leadership, the Spain national team made its debut in a FIFA World Cup, in the 1934 edition in Italy. It was during his Federation presidency it was devised a match between the League champion and the Cup champion, the precursor to the Spanish Super Cup. The outbreak of the Spanish Civil War delayed its actualization until 1940 with the Copa de los Campeones de España, won by Athletic-Aviation Club.

García Durán was also the director of the Patronato de Apuestas Mútuas Deportivas Benéficas (Charitable Sports Mutual Betting Board).

== Personal life ==
García Durán was Viscount Consort of Matamala to Countess María del Carmen de Marichalar y Bruguera, resulting in three daughters: Carmen, María Teresa, and María Asunción.

== Death ==
García Durán died in Madrid on 16 April 1966, at the age of 83. (Note: One source wrongly states that he was born on 3 August 1966.) He was a Knight of the Order of Isabella the Catholic and had other national and foreign honors.

== Honours ==
Madrid FC

- Copa del Rey:
  - Champions (1): 1905
