= Tomás Allende =

Spanish industrialist and politician (1849–1936)

- Born: Tomás Allende Alonso; 20 July 1849; Burón, León, Spain
- Died: 30 March 1936 (aged 86); Madrid, Spain
- Citizenship: Spanish
- Occupations: Industrialist; Politician; Philanthropist; Banker
- Known for: Founder of Altos Hornos de Vizcaya, Banco Urquijo, and Talleres de Guernica
- Children: Enrique Allende

Deputy of Riaño
- In office 3 December 1905 – 14 April 1910
- Preceded by: Antonio Molleda y Melcón

Senator of Spain
- In office 1899–1923

Tomás Allende Alonso (20 July 1849 – 30 March 1936) was a Spanish industrialist and politician. He was one of the most important figures in the industrial development of the Province of León. He was a Deputy for Riaño and a senator for León between 1899 and 1918, and then Soria between 1918 and 1923, until the last elections of the Restoration. He was also a banker and a philanthropist.

== Early and personal life ==
Tomás Allende was born in Burón in the Province of León on 20 July 1849, as the son of Matías Allende and Petra Alonso. He soon settled in Bilbao, where he developed a career as an industrialist and businessman.

Allende married María de Allende y Plágaro, and the couple had eight children, including María del Carmen, Enrique Timoteo, María, José, Enrique, Manuel, Rosario, Tomás, and María Teresa de Allende y Allende. A son of his, Enrique, continued his work in these two facets, and a descendant of his, Tomás Allende y García-Baxter, was a minister during the Franco dictatorship.

== Biography ==
His multiple interests in areas such as mining, railways, electricity production and distribution, and rural and urban property meant that in 1914, Allende was attributed "one of the greatest fortunes in Spain". Among the companies of which he was a shareholder, director or president of their boards of directors are: Crédito de la Unión Minera, Unión Resinera Española, Hulleras de Sabero, Minas de Cala, Electra Popular Vallisoletana, Compañía de los Ferrocarriles de Madrid a Zaragoza y Alicante (MZA), Ferrocarril La Robla-Valmaseda, Compañía Trasatlántica, Sociedad Azucarera and the Español de Crédito, Bilbao and Vizcaya banks. He was also a director of the Morro de Bilbao Mining Company, the Mineral Exploitation Company, the Sabero West Coal Company, and the Banco del Comercio.

Allende was part of pressure groups such as the National League of Producers and the Biscayan League of Producers, whose interests he defended in Madrid's power circles. He also participated, along with the Leonese chief Fernando Merino, in several companies that were at the origin of Leonese industrialization. Between 1910 and 1917, he invested more than two million pesetas in the Spanish public debt.

== Houses ==
Allende also enjoyed the purchase of real estate properties, distributed mainly between Madrid, Bilbao, León, and even in his hometown of Burón, where he built a palace at the beginning of the 20th century, which served as a summer recreation home and where he enjoyed his vacations until his death. The palace was built in the style of Indian palaces, but was also inspired by the nearby Gómez de Caso palace, from the 17th century. Notably, some of the houses that he ordered to build still stand, such as one in 1916 in Madrid that is currently the headquarters of Casa Decor, an event for the best interior design in the country. The building in which all the latest developments in the world of interior design are exhibited thus had better luck than another of its original owner's properties, the Palacio de los Allende in Burón, of which only razed stones remain as silent testimony after it being destroyed by a fire in 1973, while the walls of the palace were dismantled in 1990 when the water from the Riaño reservoir was already threatening to flood Burón. Its stones were then moved to a nearby meadow with the intention of being rebuilt, something that has never come to fruition, and the last initiative for such was presented by the Board of the city in 2017, but never came to fruition neither.

In June 1902, Allende was awarded a special prize of 500 pesetas for "the beautiful lighting of his house on Calle Mayor, no. 78, which featured the gallant Biscay bridge, with all its details and accessories of cables, frame, columns, supports, and with the shields of Spain on the two bases of said bridge and the portrait of his Majesty the king on the catwalk or ferry, all this in majolica, admirably executed".

== Politic career ==
Allende belonged to the Conservative Party, being elected for the Leonese district of Riaño in 1896, where his son Enrique later tried his luck as well, being in office between 1905 and 1910. He continued his career in the Senate, representing the province of León between 1899 and 1918, and then Soria between 1918 and 1923, until the last elections of the Restoration.

Member of the National Assembly created by Primo de Rivera in 1927, he stood out as a great benefactor of the province of León and, especially, of the family town of Burón, with donations of schools, nursing homes, and hospitals.

== Death ==
Allende died in Madrid on 30 March 1936, at the age of 86.
