= Enrique Goiri =

Spanish footballer

Personal information
- Full name: José Enrique Niceto Goiri Bayo
- Date of birth: 1 March 1877
- Place of birth: Bilbao, Biscay
- Date of death: 3 April 1925 (aged 48)
- Position: Midfielder

Senior career*
Years	Team	Apps	(Gls)
1902–1904	Athletic Club	2	(1)
- * Club domestic league appearances and goals

José Enrique Niceto Goiri Bayo (1 March 1877 - 3 April 1925) was a Spanish footballer who played as a midfielder for Athletic Club. He was one of the most important footballers in the amateur beginnings of Athletic Club, being among the 7 founders of the club in 1898, and then serving the club as a player, winning both the 1902 Copa de la Coronación and 1903 Copa del Rey, which were the club's very first piece of silverware. He was then involved in the foundation of Club Athletic de Madrid (now Atlético Madrid) in 1903. In football, his main position was a midfielder, but he played several more positions over the course of his career.

== Athletic Bilbao ==
As the son of a well-off family in Bilbao, Goiri was sent to Britain to complete his studies, doing so in the Catholic St Joseph's College, Dumfries, where he met and befriended José Maria Barquín, a fellow Basque and a future teammate at Athletic Club. In 1898, Goiri was one of the 7 Basque students belonging to the Gimnásio Zamacois who began to organize football matches against the British workers, which were contested on Sundays in Hippodrome of Lamiako, which at the time was the home of organized football in Biscay.

In February 1901, a commission made up of Goiri, Juan Astorquia, and José Maria Barquín was appointed to draft statutes and prepare regulations to legalize the company and thus turn their group of football pioneers into an official football club. This happened on 5 September 1901, in the infamous meeting held in the Café García, in which Goiri was one of the 33 men who signed the documents that gave birth to Athletic Club. Goiri was subsequently elected as the club's first-ever secretary.

Goiri then became one of the first footballers of the newly formed Athletic Club, playing as a midfielder. Together with Juan Astorquia, Alejandro de la Sota, Armand Cazeaux and Walter Evans, he was part of the teams that won the 1902 Copa de la Coronación (as Bizcaya) and the 1903 Copa del Rey, and Goiri featured in both finals, a 2–1 win over FC Barcelona in the 1902 final, and a 3–2 comeback win over Madrid FC in the very first Copa del Rey final in 1903. In the 1904 Copa del Rey Final, Athletic were declared winners again without playing a match after their opponents failed to turn up.

Goiri was known by his teammates as "Tocino".

== Athletic Madrid ==
Enrique Goiri was one of the founders of Athletic's Madrid branch, Athletic de Madrid. He appeared on the club's first board of directors as the treasurer of the club and he was even the referee of the club's very first match on 2 May 1903, coinciding with the commemoration of Dos de Mayo Uprising, which was played at the Tiro del Pichón in a friendly between the 25 members that formed it, except for the treasurer Enrique Goiri who acted as referee, either because of his loud voice or because of his age and experience among all the youth.

== Later life and death ==
Despite being a double founder of two very important clubs, his sporting activity ended right then and there. At the beginning of the 20th century, many successful Basque footballers who retired from the sport went on to flourish in many other fields, mostly politics, but Goiri transitioned into something unusual for a sportsman, as he achieved fame as a tenor and impresario due to his voice. He participated in several operas in Spain, and was also even hired in New York in 1909. In that same year, Bilbao was filled with posters with a new mystery play, in which Enrique Goiri surprised the audience with his expressive tenor.

Goiri died on 3 April 1925, at the age of 48.

== Honours ==
- Copa de la Coronación: 1902
- Copa del Rey: 1903 and 1904
