= Darío Arana =

Spanish footballer (1882–??)

Personal information
- Full name: Darío de Arana y Urigüen
- Date of birth: 14 July 1882
- Place of birth: Bilbao, Spain
- Date of death: Unknown
- Position: Goalkeeper

Senior career*
Years	Team	Apps	(Gls)
1902–1903	Madrid FC		
1903–1904	Athletic de Madrid		
- * Club domestic league appearances and goals

Darío de Arana Urigüen (born 13 July 1882) was a Spanish footballer who played as a goalkeeper in the early 20th century for Madrid FC and Athletic de Madrid, which he co-founded in 1903.

== Early life ==
Darío Arana was born on 13 July 1882, and was baptized the following day at the Catedral de Santiago in Bilbao as the son of Pedro Darío Arana Mendiolea (born 1840) and Sofía Urigüen Ansótegui. He was the sixth of ten children, including two older brothers who also played football, José Antonio (1872–1909) and Luis Arana (1874–1951).

Just like his older brothers, Darío was a member of Real Sporting Club in 1902, being member no. 32 at the time.

== Playing career ==
=== Madrid FC ===
Arana began his football career at Madrid FC, playing in two friendly matches in Madrid FC's first-ever complete season, in 1902–03. He made his debut on 23 November 1902, keeping a clean sheet in a 4–0 win against New Foot-Ball Club, before keeping another clean sheet in a goalless draw against RCD Espanyol (then known as Club Español) on 24 February 1903.

=== Athletic de Madrid ===
Due to the difficulty of becoming a regular in the Madrid first team due to Enrique Rodero and Arthur Johnson, Arana decided to participate in the foundation of a neighboring club; on 26 April 1903, he was a member of the group led by Eduardo de Acha that met the representatives of Athletic Club (of Bilbao), who had just won the 1903 Copa del Rey final, to request permission to create a Madrid branch, an idea that was very well received, and thus Athletic Club de Madrid was born. He appeared on the club's first and second board of directors as a vocal alongside the likes of Alberto Zarraoa, Ricardo de Gondra, José Toda, and Miguel de Valdeterrazo, under the presidencies of Enrique Allende and Eduardo de Acha.

== Later life ==
On 10 July 1952, Arana, who had by then become the vice president of the mining council, was declared retired in a decree by Francisco Franco, being subsequently discharged from the active service of the National Corps of Mining Engineers three days later, on 13 July, his 70th birthday. The date of his death is unknown.

== See also ==
- List of Real Madrid CF players
