= Julián Troncoso =

Spanish military man and sports leader

- Born: Julián Troncoso Sagredo; 12 November 1895; Valladolid, Spain
- Died: 26 September 1983 (aged 87); Madrid, Spain
- Citizenship: Spanish
- Occupations: Military man; Sports leader
- Known for: President of the Spanish Football Federation

9th president of the Spanish Football Federation
- In office 1939–1940
- Preceded by: Leopoldo García Durán
- Succeeded by: Luis Saura del Pan

Minister of Development
- In office 1923–1925
- Preceded by: Manuel Portela Valladares
- Succeeded by: Rafael Benjumea y Burín

Julián Troncoso Sagredo (12 November 1895 – 9 March 1983) was a Spanish military man and sports leader who served as the first president of the Francoist Spanish Football Federation between 1937 and 1939, playing a crucial role in having it recognized by FIFA, to the detriment of the republican one, and managed to structure all football in the so-called Franco zone, with a profusion of tournaments that culminated with the 1939 Copa del Generalísimo. Troncoso also served as the 9th president of the Spanish Football Federation between 1939 and 1940.

In his military life, he participated in the Battle of Annual in 1921 and was a prisoner of war.

== Early life and education ==
Julián Troncoso was born in Valladolid on 12 November 1895 into a family with strong military roots that managed to form a lineage by joining the Army along with three of his brothers.

In 1912, the 17-year-old Troncoso entered the Cavalry Academy of Valladolid where he studied until 1917, the year in which he obtained the position of lieutenant. He graduated in Physical Education from the Army Gymnastics School, the only Spanish center for the specific training of Physical Education teachers.

== Military career ==
In 1920, after staying in various garrisons on the Iberian Peninsula, Troncoso was transferred to Morocco where he was part of the Alcántara Cavalry Regiment No. 14. Integrated there, he took part in the Battle of Annual in July 1921, and as a result, he was captured on 3 August 1921 when the Zeluan position surrendered. Initially presumed dead, it was later learned that he was imprisoned in Axdir, where he remained a prisoner until 27 January 1923, when he was freed along with other imprisoned officers and embarked towards Melilla on the steamship "Antonio López". After being released, he went to Pamplona, where his wife Elena Cadena Iraizoz was from, and where he remained stationed until 1931. (Note: During their captivity, the Captain of the General Staff Sigifredo Sainz, also a captive, took a photograph in October with a machine that he was able to save when the position of Monte Arruit succumbed on 9 August. As until then bread that was sent to the captives from the Island of Al Hoceima was received with some regularity, Sainz took the opportunity to send the reel to that Island with a note for the Governor so that he had it reach his mother residing in Melilla and had it revealed there. This photo was only discovered years later, in 1943, with very poor visual quality, in the General Archive of the Administration of Alcalá de Henares.)

In June 1931, Troncoso moved to Zaragoza where he remained until 1936. At the beginning of the Spanish Civil War in 1936, Troncoso joined the uprising in Zaragoza and was injured in the fighting that took place in the Aragonese capital. While convalescing, he moved to Pamplona and from there to the Navarrese town of Garaioa where, possibly, his wife of Navarrese origin had a house, and while he was in that municipality, he went out in search of a group of Republicans who were trying to cross the border and was wounded again, this time in the thigh. On 6 September, he was appointed military commander of Vera del Bidasoa, a municipality in whose quarry numerous executions were carried out. On 10 September, he was appointed military commander of Hondarribia, which had been occupied on 4 September, and on 12 September, he took over as military commander of Irun and Hondarribia. On 23 December 1936, by order of the National Defense Board, Troncoso was named "Head of the Border Services of Northern Spain with jurisdiction in the provinces of Navarra and Gipuzkoa, being in charge of surveillance with troops from all the Pyrenees to Huesca; from the coasts to the war front and from the customs and smuggling repression services".

In 1937, Troncoso was appointed commander of Bidasoa (Borders in Irun), from where he organized, and even personally directed, a network of "commandos" dedicated to the assault and kidnapping of ships related to the republic, who clandestinely delivered goods from French ports. His successes were continued, mainly because he pretended that he was an independent entity that sold his catches to the highest bidder, but this was always the Franco Government. Hence Troncoso became known in the French media as "The Pirate of Bidasoa". After his appointment, the "Command" led by Troncoso was provided with a press office, a code cabinet, and a cartography cabinet, while its agents were stationed in Hendaye, Saint-Jean-de-Luz, Bayonne, and La Rochelle. Soon the Command decided to take action against Republican espionage and specifically against the "Quintanilla Network". The actions of the Troncoso group ended on 18 September 1937, when the failure to hijack the [[:es: C-2 (1928)|Spanish Republican submarine C-2]] in Brest resulted in the arrest of Troncoso and cost him a stint in prison in France. On 22 March 1938, a court in Brest sentenced Troncoso and other members of the command to six months in prison, but fortunately for him, the accusations could only implicate him in the use of weapons without a license since such a submarine "did not exist", so he was released four days later and then expelled from France by Hendaye. With his expulsion from France his career as an undercover agent of Julián Troncoso ended, so when he returned to Spain, he was removed from his position as Military Commander of Bidasoa and transferred to the Catalan front. The republican press declared him dead in March 1938, however the news turned out to be false.

He retired with the rank of colonel, achieved in 1952, becoming in 1959 in the reserve and presiding over the National Transport Union, becoming a solicitor in the Cortes in 1963.

== Sporting career ==
A participant in equestrian competitions, on the occasion of his military assignment in Zaragoza, Troncoso was named president of the Aragonese Athletics Federation, where he did an outstanding job. Recruited for football, he was part, as a member, of the Real Zaragoza board in 1935, the season in which the club was promoted to the First Division.

In October 1937, in the Franco zone, he was elected president of the Spanish Football Federation created in San Sebastián, and during the civil war, apart from his own military activity, Troncoso managed to structure all football in the so-called "national zone", the Franco zone, with a profusion of tournaments that culminated with the 1939 Copa del Generalísimo. While Troncoso was imprisoned, or fighting in the Ebro, he was replaced at the federation's helm by the journalist López García, who would theoretically hand over the baton back to Troncoso on 26 June 1938 during a meeting held at the headquarters of the Pamplona-based CA Osasuna, but only after the last war report in 1939 can Troncoso be considered an authentic and genuine president of the federation, thus being the 9th president after Leopoldo García Durán, and holding this position for a year and a half. The structure of the new Federation was based, on one hand, on the organization of the fragile professionalism in order for the players to have another professional activity outside of sport that would allow them to survive with dignity when the money from football ran out; on the other, the implementation of a percentage of the box office allocated to the visiting team, with the intention that the economically powerful clubs would help those less endowed with means, but important in terms of the production of players. This task, perhaps romantic, was naturally hindered by those big clubs, which together with the problem of the First Division vacancy that Real Oviedo had left and that he had promised to Osasuna de Pamplona, forced his resignation in October 1940.

His efforts with the International Football Federation (FIFA), which culminated with the recognition of the Spanish Federation of San Sebastián, allowed international continuity for Spain after the end of the Civil War and, later, the Second World War. After the Civil War, Troncoso was appointed president of the Spanish Football Federation by the National Sports Delegate General Moscardó. He had a younger brother who was a director of Real Madrid for several years under the presidency of Santiago Bernabéu, and Troncoso himself was also vice president of Real Madrid between 1961 and 1964, and was also an attorney in Cortes for the National Transport Union that he presided over, being a businessman in the sector.

Such was his sporting vocation that until the end of his days, he taught physical education in secondary schools.
