= Pío Wandosell (businessman) =

Spanish businessman and politician (1847–1920)

- Born: Pío Wandosell y Gil; 1847; Alhama de Almería, Spain
- Died: 21 July 1920 (aged 72–73)
- Citizenship: Spanish
- Occupations: Businessman; Politician
- Known for: Founder of

Pío Wandosell y Gil (1847 – 21 July 1920) was a Spanish businessman and politician who built and owned an electricity factory near Orihuela.

== Biography ==
Born in Alhama de Almería, Pío Wandosell trained in the trade of smelting and mining, so in his early 20s, he moved to the mines of La Unión, where he was appointed as the director of several foundries and made a considerable fortune during the mining boom. He often shared political ideas with his fellow countryman Nicolás Salméron y Alonso, whom he had met thanks to his friendship with Gonzalo Figueroa y Torres, the Marquess of Villamejor.

Wandosell married Dolores Calvache Yáñez, with whom he had eight children, and at the turn of the century, he and his family spent some time in England before returning to Spain, where they settled in Madrid in 1895, not only so that his sons could study there, but also to increase his political involvement in the newly-founded Republican Party, becoming an active member there. Four of his sons, Adolfo, Pío, Julio, and Francisco, who had fallen in love with the sport of football back in England, began to play it during their stay in the capital, with Adolfo and Pío being part of the very first line-up of Madrid FC (currently known as Real Madrid), while Francisco was a referee in the 1920s. Following his wife's death from pneumonia, he married his sister-in-law, Francisca Calvache.

When he returned to the Union in the late 1890s, Wandosell introduced significant improvements to his business, both in terms of production processes and labor. For instance, in 1900, he built a summer residence near Roche, which he called Villa Dolores, and which served as both a recreational and agricultural space, and in the following year, in November 1901, he bought sixteen farms in Orihuela and Murcia for 50,000 duros, with the arch known as los santicos de piedra bearing his initials. One of the farms, called Molino de la Ciudad, included an old grain and paprika flour mill with six millstones, six hearths, six gates, six driving wheels, and a waterfall. A clever businessman who was also fond of engineering, Wandosell quickly realized the possibilities offered by the waterfall on which the mill was based, so after several studies, he knocked down the old mill to make way for a new industrial building with an electric light installation to supply the city of Orihuela and other nearby towns. Once the electricity factory was completed in early 1905, the Orihuela City Council authorized it, and he maintained the supply of Orihuela until he died.

== Death ==
In 1912, Wandosell was diagnosed with cerebral arteriosclerosis, which progressively took away his faculties until he died in Cartagena on 21 July 1920, at the age of 72.

== Legacy ==
In 2014, one of his great-grandson, Gonzalo Wandosell Fernández de Bobadilla, published a biography about him called Pío Wandosell Gil. Lost Memoirs of a Bold Entrepreneur. Portrait of an Era: La Unión 1868-1920.
