= Pío Wandosell (footballer) =

Spanish footballer

Personal information
- Full name: Pío Abdón Wandosell Calvache
- Date of birth: 30 July 1881
- Place of birth: La Unión, Murcia, Spain
- Date of death: 1907 (aged 26)
- Place of death: Madrid, Spain
- Position: Defender

Senior career*
| Years | Team | Apps | (Gls) |
| 1900–1902 | Alfonso XII College | | |
| 1902 | Madrid FC | | |
| 1902 | New Foot-Ball Club | | |
| 1903 | Internacional FC | | |
| 1903–1904 | Madrid FC | | |
- * Club domestic league appearances and goals

Pío Abdón Wandosell Calvache (30 July 1881 – 1907) was a Spanish footballer who played as a defender for Madrid FC, who is best known for taking part in the club's very first line-up in 1902.

== Early life and education ==
Pío Wandosell was born in La Unión on 30 July 1881, as the eldest son of Pío Wandosell and Dolores Calvache Yáñez. At the turn of the century, the Wandosells spent some time in England, where he and his brothers developed a deep interest for football, so when the family returned to Spain, settling in the capital, he and his brother Adolfo began to play it, first in the streets, and later at the Royal Alfonso XII College, where they were attending secondary education, with Pío studying Industrial Engineering. He also studied at Instituto de San Isidro.

== Playing career ==
They stood out from the rest as they became part of the Colegio's football team, where they were soon spotted by the newly-founded Madrid FC, who recruited them at the end of 1901. A few months later, on 9 March 1902, Pío and Adolfo played in the club's very first match, playing under the names "Wandosell I" and "Wandosell II" in order to avoid confusion in the sports chronicles. On 23 December 1902, Pío started for New Foot-Ball Club in a match against Madrid at the Concurso de Bandas, which ended in a resounding 2–9 loss.

After the poor sporting results experienced, chaos settled within the entity, and as a result of the disagreements among its members, many of them, including Wandosell, decided to leave the club to found a new one, Internacional Foot-ball Club, in January 1903, appearing on the club's first board of directors as a treasuer. Just three months after being founded, however, Internacional accepted to merge with Madrid FC, which absorbed the club in April 1903. Some of the Internacional FC associates became members of the board of directors of Madrid FC, such as Wandosell, Eugenio Bisbal, and Miguel de Valdeterrazo, with the former two even filling management positions.

== Later life and death ==
In 1905, the Wandosell family moved to Cartagena, where he died after an illness at the age of 26. His death coupled with the inability of his father to attend his businesses in Orihuela led Adolfo to leave Cartagena to take over the businesses that his father had there.
