= 1905 Copa del Rey final =

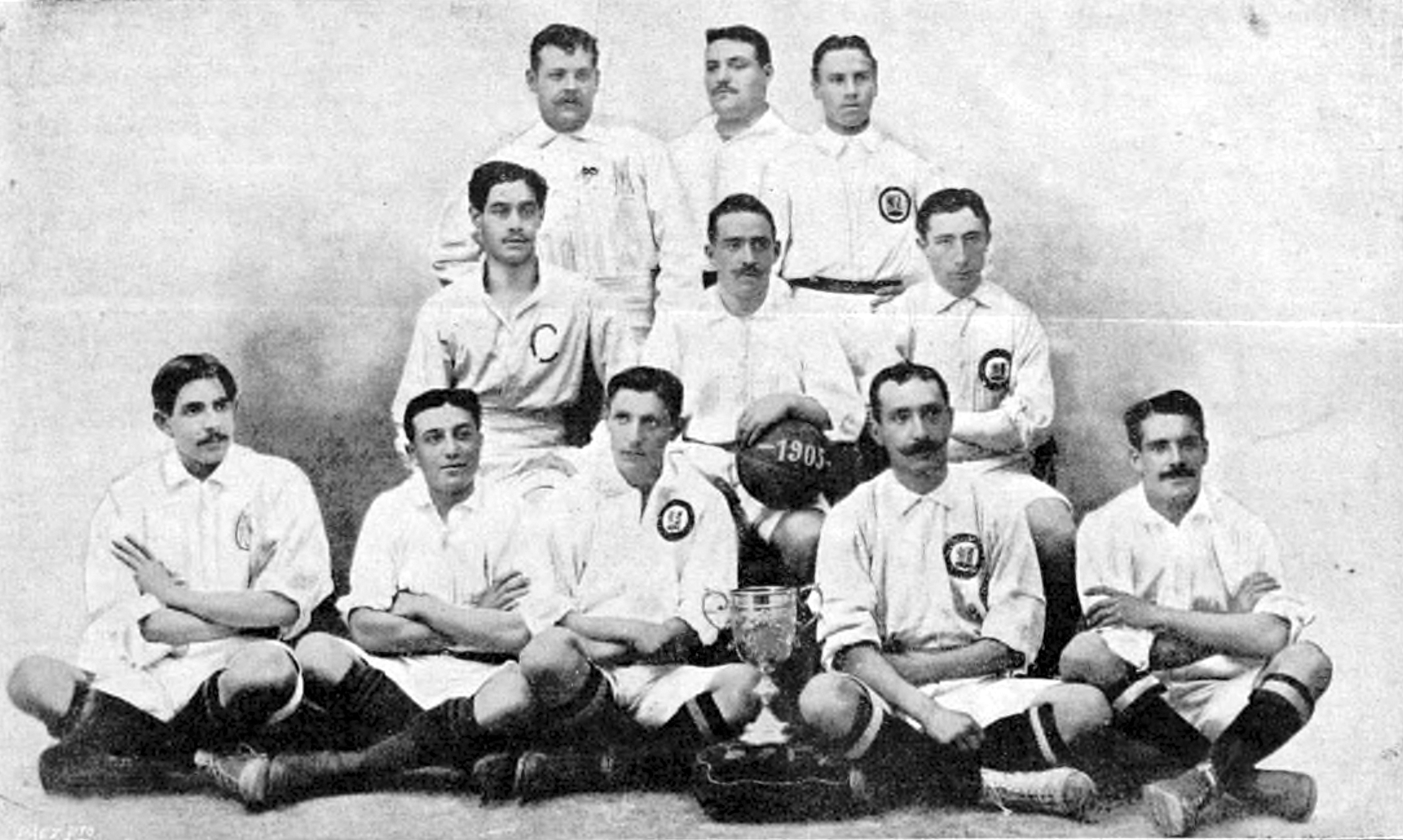
- Madrid CF, champion
- Event: 1905 Copa del Rey
| Athletic Bilbao | Madrid FC |
| 0 | 1 |
- Date: 18 April 1905
- Venue: Hipódromo, Madrid
- Referee: (England) Forster

The 1905 Copa del Rey final was the third final of the Copa del Rey, the Spanish football cup competition. The match took place on 18 April 1905 at the Hipódromo, Madrid. The match was contested by Athletic Bilbao and Madrid FC. Madrid was awarded the trophy for the first time after defeating Athletic Bilbao 1–0 with Manuel Prast netting the only goal of the match.

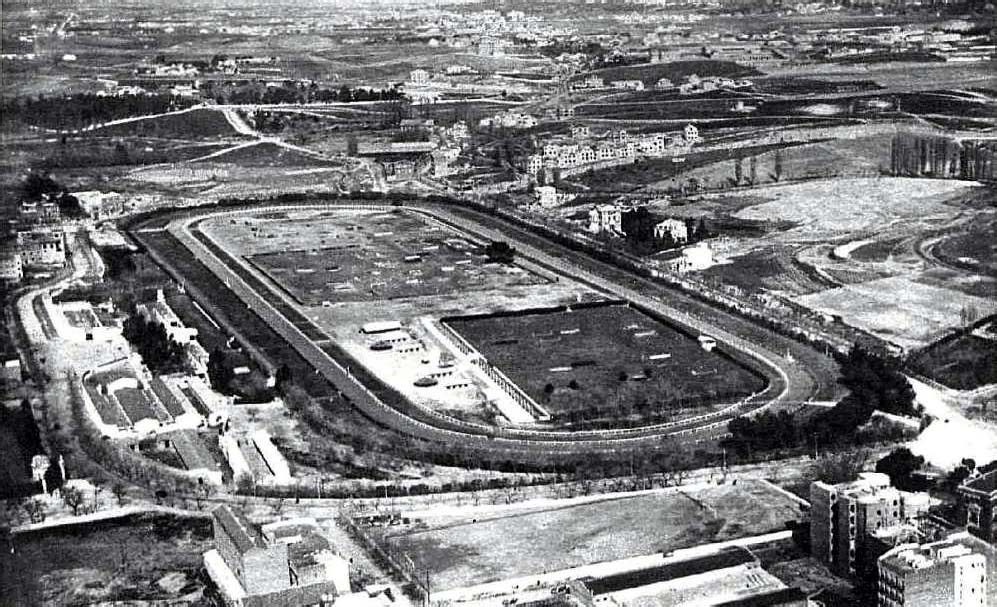
Hipódromo de la Castellana, venue

== Match details ==
18 April 1905

| Athletic Bilbao | 0–1 | Madrid FC |
|---|---|---|
| | Report1; Report 2 | Prast 70' |

Tiro del Pichón, Madrid
Referee: (England) Forster

Athletic Bilbao
Madrid FC

| GK | (Spain) Javier Prado |
| DF | (Argentina) Hermenegildo García |
| DF | (Spain) José Irízar |
| MF | (Switzerland) Charles Ruesch |
| MF | (Spain) Tomás Murga |
| MF | (Spain) Luis Silva |
| FW | (England) W. H. Davies |
| FW | (Spain) Miguel de Valdeterrazo |
| FW | (England) William Dyer |
| FW | (Spain) Alejandro de la Sota |
| FW | (Spain) Benigno Larrea |

| GK | (Spain) Manuel Alcalde |
| DF | (Spain) José Berraondo (c) |
| DF | (Spain) Telesforo Álvarez |
| MF | (Spain) Eugenio Bisbal |
| MF | (Spain) Luciano Lizárraga |
| MF | (France) Enrique Normand |
| FW | (France) Pedro Parages |
| FW | (Spain) Manuel Prast |
| FW | (Spain) Antonio Alonso |
| FW | (Guatemala) Federico Revuelto |
| FW | (Spain) Joaquín Yarza |

== See also ==
- El Viejo Clásico
