= Manuel Vallarino =

Spanish football executive, and player

3rd President of New Foot-Ball Club
- In office 1902–1903
- Preceded by: Ángel Mayora

Personal details
- Born: 17 November 1883 Madrid, Spain
- Died: 1 June 1919 (aged 35) Dénia, Valencia, Spain
Association football career
- Full name: Manuel Vallarino de Iraola
- Position: Forward
Senior career*
| Years | Team | Apps | (Gls) |
| 1900–1903 | New Foot-Ball Club | | |
| 1902–1903 | Madrid FC | | |
| 1903–1904 | Español de Madrid | | |
- * Club domestic league appearances and goals

Manuel Vallarino de Iraola (17 November 1883 – 1 June 1919) was a Spanish footballer who played as a forward for Madrid FC and Español de Madrid. He also served as the third president of New Foot-Ball Club, and he was the team's captain at the 1902 Copa de la Coronación. He was part of the historic Madrid team that played in the first-ever Copa del Rey in 1903.

== Playing career ==
=== Sky/New FC ===
He developed a deep interest in football in his youth, and soon enough he became one of the first football personalities in the capital. Vallarino was one of the enthusiastic footballers that joined and played for Sky Foot-Ball Club, the first club to ever exist in the capital. He stayed loyal to the club despite the instability of the club, which caused three major splits between 1900 and 1902, the last of which, on 15 March 1902, led to a strong restructuring that included a change of name, to New Foot-Ball Club, along with a change of presidency, with Manuel Vallarino taking over from Ángel Mayora. Vallarino's intended to guide such a reformed club into a position of supremacy in the city, but the strength of the newly-founded Madrid FC (now Real Madrid CF), very firm in its foundations, prevented from achieving it.

=== 1902 Copa de la Coronación ===
When Madrid FC endorsed a tournament in the capital in the May festivities which become known as Copa de la Coronación, the forerunner of the Copa del Rey founded a year later, Vallarino organized a series of matches at Tiro del Pichón as part of New's build-up to the tournament, and these games were played by the members of the club divided into two teams: one dressed in white, led by Ángel Mayora, and another in red, led by Vallarino, who shone the brightest, netting several goals, including a hat-trick on 19 March to help his side to a 3–0 win and a brace on 23 March in a 3–2 win. New was thus one of the five teams who participated in the Copa de la Coronación, and since the figure of coach as we know it today did not exist at the time, it was Vallarino, the president and captain of the club, who was in charge of making up the line-ups and dictating the tactics to be followed. In the semi-finals against Club Vizcaya (a combination of players from Athletic Club and Bilbao FC), New was humiliated when they got knocked-out by a resounding 1–8. After the poor sporting results experienced, chaos settled within the entity, and as a result of the disagreements among its members, many of them decided to leave the club, including its president, Manuel Vallarino, who left for Madrid FC.

=== Madrid FC ===
He did not lose his goal-scoring instinct at Madrid, and quickly became the club's starting striker, and in his first season at the club, Vallarino played a pivotal role in helping the Madrid team reach the first-ever Copa del Rey final in 1903, featuring in the final alongside the likes of Federico Revuelto, the Giralts (Mario, José and Armando) and Antonio Neyra. They were beaten 2–3 by Athletic Club.

=== Español de Madrid ===
Despite some encouraging first steps in the white club, it was possibly the fact of losing the 1903 Cup final that caused a convulsive situation within the entity that led to the departure of several of its founding members, including the Giralts, Neyra and Vallarino himself, who left Madrid FC in October 1903 and they refounded Club Español de Madrid, a club who had collapsed in the summer. It was common at the time for players to leave their respective teams to join or found others due to the still dispersed and confusing growth of football. Vallarino played a crucial role in helping Español de Madrid win the 1903–04 Centro Championship, hence qualifying for the 1904 Copa del Rey, which ended in controversy as they were unable to participate in the final, meaning Athletic were declared winners again.

== Honours ==
Español de Madrid

- Centro Championship:
  - Champions (1): 1903–04
- Copa del Rey:
  - Runner-up (1): 1904
