= Telesforo Álvarez =

Spanish footballer

Personal information
- Full name: Telesforo Álvarez Quevedo
- Date of birth: 5 January 1881
- Place of birth: Reinosa, Cantabria, Spain
- Position: Defender

Senior career*
Years	Team	Apps	(Gls)
1900–1903	RCD Espanyol		
1903–1905	Madrid FC		
- * Club domestic league appearances and goals

Telesforo Álvarez Quevedo (5 January 1881 – Unknown) was a Spanish footballer who played as a defender for RCD Espanyol and Madrid FC, winning the 1905 Copa del Rey with the later. His younger brother José, also played for Espanyol in 1911.

== Playing career ==
=== RCD Espanyol ===
Telesforo Álvarez was born on 5 January 1881 in Reinosa, Cantabria, but it was in Barcelona where he began to play football. He was one of the first associates in the history of Sociedad Española, now known as RCD Espanyol, being elected a vocal in the club's first board of directors. He stood out for his great corpulence who despite everything had great agility, a combination that made him an excellent defender.

Together with Ángel Ponz, Luciano Lizárraga, Joaquim Carril, and club founders Octavi Aballí and Ángel Rodríguez, he represented Espanyol in the very first Spanish club to win an official title, the 1900–01 Copa Macaya, which was the first football competition played on the Iberian Peninsula. He also played in the following two editions of the competition, scoring once in the second edition in 1901–02 and winning the third in 1902–03, the club's first-ever piece of silverware. In total, he played 15 matches in the Copa Macaya.

=== Madrid FC ===
In 1903, Álvarez moved to the capital, where he joined the ranks of Madrid FC, with whom he played for two seasons. He made his competitive debut in the second season, playing two matches in the Copa del Rey of 1905. In the final against Athletic Bilbao, Álvarez formed a defensive partnership with the club captain José Berraondo, which proved to be crucial as they kept a clean sheet to help their side to a 1–0 victory.

== Honours ==
RCD Espanyol

- Copa Macaya:
  - Champions: 1902–03
- Copa Barcelona:
  - Runner-up: 1902–03

Madrid FC

- Copa del Rey:
  - Champions (1): 1905
