= 1903 Campeonato de Madrid =

Tournament details
- Country: Madrid
- Teams: 4

Final positions
- Champions: Moderno FC
- Runners-up: Madrid FC (1st title) (Note: The 1903 championship was won by Moderno FC and was included in Real Madrid's trophies following their merger in 1904.)

Tournament statistics
- Matches played: 12
- Goals scored: 16 (1.33 per match)

The 1903 Campeonato de Madrid (English: 1903 Madrid Championship) was the 1st staging of the Regional Championship of Madrid, formed to designate the champion of the region. It was organized by the recently established Madrid Football Federation, and the different football teams that made up the downtown area were invited to participate in what was the first official football competition in the capital. The competition was held at the Hipódromo de la Castellana between 15 November and its last match was played on 27 December, although there were two further matches scheduled for January which never were held. The tournament was won by Moderno FC, narrowly beating Madrid FC (currently Real Madrid) by just one point.

== Background ==
At the end of 1902, in December, all the Madrid clubs of the time participated in the Concurso de Bandas, a kind of precursor to the Regional Championship that began in the following year. Concurso de Bandas was the first tournament organized by the recently established Madrid Football Federation and is now regarded as the first incarnation of a Madrid Cup. In this contest, named after the prize at stake, some embroidered bands played the first-ever tournament disputed exclusively by Madrid clubs. It featured five teams from the Spanish capital: Madrid FC, Moderno FC, New Foot-Ball Club (former Sky Football club), Español de Madrid and Club Retiro. The latter three all collapsed in 1903 (although Español de Madrid was later refounded), thus not participating in the 1903 Campeonato de Madrid later that year. Coincidentally, the two teams who reprised their participation, Madrid and Moderno, merged on 30 January 1904. Moreover, Moderno had been founded just a few weeks earlier and played despite having played just a handful of preparatory matches prior to it. The games were held at Hipódromo de la Castellana and Plaza de Toros Avenue.

Moderno came face-to-face with Madrid FC for the first time in a match held at the Plaza de Toros Avenue on 25 December 1902, Moderno lost 16–0 to Madrid, the biggest-ever loss and win of the respective clubs at the time, although Madrid improved it just three days later, on 28 December, when they beat Español de Madrid 19–1. Juan Padrós received "the bands for the champion".

== Overview ==
The tournament was originally scheduled to have been held in the spring of 1903, but the proximity of the summer period led the competition to be postponed to autumn, lasting until the beginning of 1904. Football was rarely practiced in the stage of the greatest sun, due to the great efforts that a football match required, and in fact, at the time, cricket was the sport that was traditionally played in the summer, with football being played in the winter.

It featured four teams from the Spanish capital: Madrid FC (currently Real Madrid), Moderno FC, Moncloa FC and Iberia FC. Only the latter was not officially established in 1902, having been founded in early 1903. Moderno won the tournament after beating Moncloa FC 1–3 and Iberia FC 6–0, for a total of four points. Despite the fact that at first it was projected to be a dispute of 12 games, finally, only two games per team were played.

Over the years, the winner of the championship would be chosen as the Madrid representative at the Copa del Rey, however, in 1903, the "Qualification Contest for the Copa del Rey" was held. The honor finally fell to Madrid FC as they were the only club to present themselves for the tournament, although it remains unclear why only Madrid FC entered the Qualifying Contest for the Copa del Rey.

== Table ==
Pos	Team	Pld	W	D	L	GF	GA	GD	Pts
1	Moderno FC (C)	2	2	0	0	9	1	+8	4
2	Madrid FC	2	1	0	1	9	3	+6	2
3	Moncloa FC	2	1	0	1	4	4	0	2
4	Iberia FC	2	0	0	2	0	14	−14	0

Source: Rec.Sport.Soccer Statistics Foundation
Rules for classification: 1) points; 2) goal difference; 3) number of goals scored.
(C) Champions

== Results ==
15 November 1903 *	Moncloa FC	1–3	Moderno FC	Hipódromo de la Castellana, Madrid
		Report

15 November 1903 *	Madrid FC	8–0	Iberia FC	Hipódromo de la Castellana, Madrid
		Report

22 November 1903 *	Moderno FC	6–0	Iberia FC	Hipódromo de la Castellana, Madrid
		Report

29 November 1903	Moderno FC	1–4	Madrid FC	Hipódromo de la Castellana, Madrid
		Report
Note: Madrid FC started the match with 10 players.

5 December 1903	Moncloa FC	?–?	Iberia FC	Hipódromo de la Castellana, Madrid
		Report

8 December 1903	Madrid FC	?–?	Moncloa FC	Hipódromo de la Castellana, Madrid
		Report
Note: The match was postponed on 22 November 1903 because of Moncloa FC's improper line-up.

13 December 1903	Iberia FC	?–?	Moderno FC	Hipódromo de la Castellana, Madrid
		Report
Note: Modern won due to default of Iberia FC

20 December 1903 *	Moncloa FC	3–1	Madrid FC	Hipódromo de la Castellana, Madrid
	Merino; García	Report	Valdeterrazo	Referee: Álvarez

23 December 1903	Iberia FC	0–9	Madrid FC	Hipódromo de la Castellana, Madrid
		Report	Parages; Revuelto; Wandosell; Mendía	Referee: Garrido

27 December 1903	Moderno FC	0–0	Moncloa FC	Hipódromo de la Castellana, Madrid
		Report

1 January 1903	Iberia FC	?–?	Moncloa FC	Hipódromo de la Castellana, Madrid
		Report

3 January 1904	Madrid FC	?–?	Moderno FC	Hipódromo de la Castellana, Madrid
		Report

- Valid matches.

== See also ==
- History of Real Madrid CF
- 1903–04 Madrid FC season
