= Eduardo de Acha =

Spanish football executive (1878–1928)

2nd
- In office 1903 – 20 February 1907
- Preceded by: Enrique Allende
- Succeeded by: Ricardo de Gondra

Personal details
- Born: 13 March 1878 Madrid, Spain
- Died: 30 November 1928 (aged 50) Ibid., Spain
Association football career
- Full name: Eduardo de Acha Otáñez
- Birth name: Eduardo de Acha y Otáñez
- Position: Midfielder
Senior career*
| Years | Team | Apps | (Gls) |
| 1903 | Athletic de Madrid | | |
- * Club domestic league appearances and goals

Eduardo de Acha y Otáñez (13 March 1878 – 30 November 1928) was a Spanish soldier (Captain of the Artillery) and Knight of the Order of Calatrava. In 1903 he was one of the main architects of the foundation of Club Athletic de Madrid (now Atlético Madrid), an entity of which he would serve as its second president between 1903 and 1907.

== Early years ==
Acha was born on 13 March 1878 in Madrid as the son of Juan Nicolás de Acha, who founded the Ophthalmic Institute of Madrid, which would later be donated to the state. To thank this initiative, King Alfonso XIII appointed Alberto de Acha Marquis de Acha, eldest son of Juan Nicolás and Eduardo's older brother, with a marquesado (a marquisate).

== Foundation of Athletic ==
In April 1903, Acha had to travel to Bilbao for family matters at that time, and there he took the opportunity to request from Athletic Club, who had just won the 1903 Copa del Rey final on 8 April, the requirements for the creation of a Madrid branch of the Bilbao club. The idea was received with enthusiasm in the Basque town, so he was immediately provided with the statutes, the shield and he was even invited to pose in the official photo alongside the Spanish champions. Thus, on the night of April 25–26, he organized a meeting between all the participants in the idea at the Sociedad Vasco Navarra in Madrid, which included a Basque colony of students from the Escuela Superior de Minas and four former and current associates of Madrid FC (Julián Palacios, Valdeterrazo, Eustaquio Celada, and Darío de Arana), and on the morning of 26, this group led by him and the directors of the Basque club met to officially give birth to Athletic de Madrid.

Acha appeared on the club's first board of directors as a secretary with Enrique Allende as president. Despite the insistence of the rest of the founders to elect Acha president, Acha himself opted instead for the 32-year-old Allende to become the club's first president because even though he had been the main promoter and architect of the team's creation, Allende had a comfortable economic situation and could thus act as patron of the club, a decision that was staunchly defended by the future president Ricardo de Gondra. However, Allende did not meet the expectations that were held of him; he soon got tired and stopped showing much interest in football, so he resigned in the fall of that same year, and Acha assumed the presidency.

The club played their first-ever match on the following week, on 2 May, between members of the same club at the Campo del Retiro, thus displacing the evicted New Foot-ball Club off this playing field with their presence to the point of being the final straw for its disappearance.

== Club presidency ==
Athletic Club de Bilbao helped Athletic de Madrid from the first moment, giving them uniforms, a badge, and the name. In the first years, they could not participate in national tournaments due to their link with its counterpart from Bilbao, so Acha gave several of his team's best players to Athletic Club so that they could play in the tournament in exchange for their help. Together, they won the 1904 Copa del Rey, where Athletic were declared winners without playing a match after their opponents failed to turn up.

During his presidency, Athletic made its first participation in an official tournament, in October 1906, by partaking in the Madrid Championship, whose winner would go on to the Copa del Rey as a representative of the Madrid region, except if said champion was Athletic, as they were prohibited from competing against their parent club from Bilbao. Until then, all the matches played since its foundation had been friendly games. The club got its first competitive victory on 6 December 1906, when they unexpectedly, but convincingly defeated Madrid 5–0.

Having moved its headquarters to Calle Fuencarral, Athletic Club de Madrid wanted to officially establish itself and formalize its first regulations, instead of continuing to use Bilbao's. Eduardo de Acha drafted a statute to obtain legal personality, in accordance with the law of associations of 30 June 1887, drawing up the club's own statutes, so on 20 February 1907, the club was registered in the official registry of associations, thus officially disassociated itself from Athletic Club de Bilbao.

With the club's independence, a new board of directors was elected and Acha resigned from his position on 20 February 1907, the same day that Athletic de Madrid got their independence when they stopped being a branch of the Bilbao club, with Ricardo de Gondra, another of the club's founders, taking over the presidency. The unofficial links with Athletic Club de Bilbao (for instance, both teams switched their shirt colours to red-and-white in 1910 via a single order from England) would continue, although with different intensity, until 1923.

== Military career ==
At the same time, Acha developed a career as a soldier and became captain of the artillery and a member of the Order of Calatrava.

== Death ==
Acha married Manuela Sánchez-Arjona y Velasco (12 August 1887 – 23 April 1957), daughter of the 1st Marquis of Casa Arjona and twice great-granddaughter of the 2nd Marquis of Ríocabado, and had six children and daughters.

Acha died in Madrid on Saint Andrew's Day (November 30) of 1928, at the age of 50.
