= Iberia Football Club =

Football club in Spain active between 1903 and 1907

- Full name: Iberia Football Club
- Short name: Iberia FC
- Founded: February 1903
- Dissolved: 1907
- Ground: Campo del Retiro
- League: Campeonato Regional Centro
| Home colours | Away colours |

The Iberia Football Club, commonly referred to as Iberia FC, was a football club based in Madrid, Spain, which existed between 1903 and 1907. Founded in early 1903, it was one of the first football clubs to have been founded in the Spanish capital, behind Madrid FC, Español de Madrid, Moncloa FC, and Moderno FC.

The club is best known for participating in the first two editions of the Campeonato de Madrid. In 1904, however, all of its members left for the Moderno FC, which was in turn absorbed by Madrid FC, which caused Iberia to disappear from the Madrid scene until an attempt to reactivate it in 1907, the same year in which a new merger with the Sociedad Gimnástica led to its complete disappearance.

== History ==
=== Origins ===
Iberia Football Club was founded in the first months of 1903, during a time when football was beginning to become popular in the city and give rise to numerous football societies, such as Madrid FC (1901), Español de Madrid (1901), Club Retiro (1902), Moncloa FC (July 1902), and Moderno FC (October 1902).

The club had to wait for a few weeks after its foundation to play its first match against another society, which took place in March, when it was not yet a month old, against Castilla Foot-Ball Club, which was also making its debut. Iberia's first-ever line-up was: Rojas, goalkeeper; Jorquera and Valls, defenders; S. Paz, Ramo and Cálvez, midfielders; and Ortega, Martínez, Jiménez, R. Paz, and Alcubilla, forwards; and they rose to the occasion by helping their side to a 5–0 victory, with the chronicles of the time highlighting the performances of Valls, Jorquera and Jiménez, especially the latter, who was "the one who managed to score the majority of the goals". Iberia then played its second match in a friendly against Moderno FC, this time losing 0–2.

=== Tournaments ===
Later that same year, Iberia made its competitive debut at the 1903 Campeonato de Madrid, the very first edition of the Regional Championship of Madrid, where they faced Madrid FC, Moncloa FC, and Moderno FC. The team obtained discreet results, finishing last in the classification after suffering several defeats, only three of Iberia's results are known, two of which to Madrid by 0–8 and 0–9, and the other to Moderno by 0–6.

The Madrid representative for the inaugural Copa del Rey in 1903 was chosen through a Qualifying Contest after the end of the Madrid Championship, and the honor finally fell to Madrid FC as it was the only club entitled to play in the tournament, although it remains unclear why only Madrid FC entered the Qualifying Contest for the Copa del Rey.

In the following year, the club once again participated in the Madrid Championship, and again without having much luck either, as they suffered yet another resounding loss, this time to Moncloa FC by 0–4, in the semifinals of the tournament.

== Decline and collapse ==
After the poor sporting results experienced, chaos settled within the entity, and as a result of the disagreements among its members, many of them decided to leave the club in 1904, to join Moderno FC, which also absorbed the Victoria Football Club. The club was greatly affected by the departure of numerous members and it apparently disappeared.

A few years later, however, Iberia was apparently reborn, or perhaps it never had disappeared and simply continued, but with little activity. Either way, in 1907, the club was finally absorbed by Sociedad Gimnástica along with players from Moncloa FC, and this time it disappeared definitively.
