= Moderno Football Club =

Football club in Spain active between 1902 and 1904

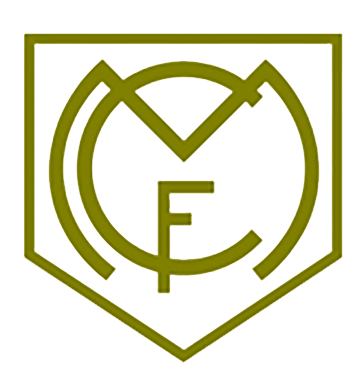
- The shield of Madrid-Moderno FC
- Full name: Moderno Football Club
- Short name: Moderno FC
- Founded: November 1902
- Dissolved: January 1904
- Ground: Hipódromo de Madrid
- Chairman: Fernando Kummer
- League: Centro championship
Home colours

The Moderno Football Club, officially founded as The Modern Foot-Ball Club, was a football club based in Madrid, Spain, which was founded in November 1902 and dissolved just over a year later in January 1904 after being absorbed by Real Madrid FC.

Moderno is best known for winning the first Madrid championship in 1903, after beating the likes of Madrid FC, Moncloa FC and Iberia FC. Despite its early success, however, the club was subjected to an early disappearance in 1904, when it was absorbed by a decimated Madrid FC, which was then briefly renamed Madrid-Moderno Foot-Ball Club (a condition that the Modern FC demanded for fusion). Thus, Moderno was one of the clubs that made it possible for Madrid FC to continue growing. In addition to players, Moderno also provided the original idea for the current coat of arms of Madrid, with the coincidence in the initials of both clubs (M) allowing Madrid to take the design from the modernist club.

The club disputed its matches at the Hipódromo de Madrid, sharing the field with Madrid FC, as there were hardly any fields in Madrid at the time. As for clothing, the club wore a white shirt.

== History ==
=== Beginnings ===
Founded at the end of 1902 as The Modern Foot-Ball Club, the entity almost immediately made its name Hispanic, Moderno Foot-Ball Club. At the time, football was beginning to become popular in the city and numerous football societies were being founded. Its first and only known president, Fernando Kummer, organized the first meeting of the club on 13 November, although the number of members they had in that first meeting remains unclear. The first unofficial match in the club's history was held on 21 November, when they faced another newly established society called Sport Foot-Ball Club, winning by a score of 3–1.

Within just one month of its foundation, in December 1902, Moderno FC took part in the Concurso de Bandas, the first tournament organized by the recently established Madrid Football Federation, thus engaging in some of the very first competitive football matches in the city despite having played just a handful of preparatory matches prior to it. At the tournament, Moderno came face-to-face with Madrid FC for the first time in a match held at the Plaza de Toros Avenue on 25 December 1902, ending with a resounding 0–16 loss to Madrid, who came out winners of the tournament after comfortably beating the remaining opponents. This was the club's biggest ever defeat in its short history.

=== 1903 Centro Championship ===
In 1903, Moderno took advantage of crises within the societies of Iberia Football Club and Victoria Football Club to absorb both clubs, thus incorporating several of their most prominent players, which meant a big leap in quality for the club, and as a result, they managed to win the only title of its short history, the 1903 Centro Championship, the successor of Concurso de Bandas. Moderno won the title with 7 points, just one more than Madrid who finished with 6. Over the years, the winner of the championship would be chosen as the Madrid representative at the Copa del Rey, however, in 1903 the honor fell to Madrid FC as it was the only club entitled to play in the tournament, although it remains unclear why only Madrid FC entered the Qualifying Contest for the Copa del Rey.

=== Decline and Collapse ===
Madrid FC's loss in the 1903 Copa del Rey Final caused a convulsive situation within the entity that led to the departure of several of its founding and most important members. The split was led by the Giralt brothers (Mario, José and Armando) and Antonio Neyra, who then refounded the Club Español de Madrid in late 1903. This put Madrid in a very difficult situation as they were suffering of lack of players. Moderno was also struggling, so the directors of Madrid FC, Juan and Carlos Padrós, proposed to Fernando Kummer an agreement that could benefit everyone: a merge. Relations between these two clubs were good, so Moderno accepted with only one condition. They required to impose its name in the new name of the club, and so, on 30 January 1904, the two clubs joined forces in order to survive, emerging as Madrid-Moderno Football Club, the name under which it competed in the 1903–04 Centro Championship. However, the term "Moderno", the last trace of the club, fell into disuse over time and in the following season, the team again became the "Madrid Football Club". Carlos Padrós was elected president post-merger.

== Honours ==
- Campeonato Regional Centro
  - Winners (1): 1903
