= Garaioa =

Town in Navarre, Spain

Coordinates: 42.931°N 1.243°W

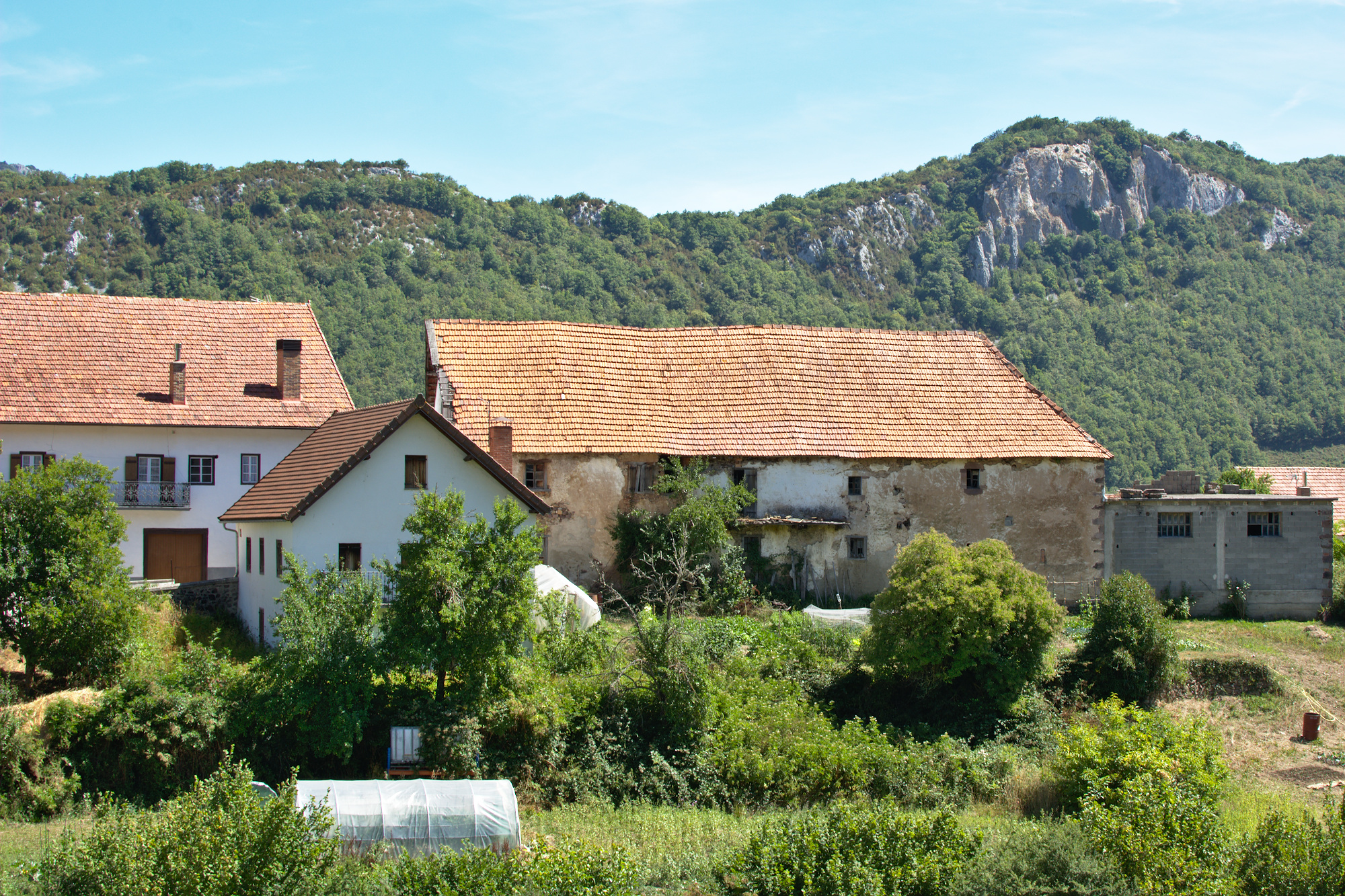
Garaioa Navarre, Spain

Garaioa is a town and municipality located in the province and autonomous community of Navarre, northern Spain.
