= Burón =

- Flag Coat of arms
- Nickname: Valdeburón
- Location within Spain
- Coordinates: 43°1′24″N 5°3′4″W
- Country: Spain
- Autonomous community: Castile and León
- Province: León
- Municipality: Burón

Government
  - Mayor: Porfirio Díez Casado (PP)

Area
  - Total: 157.71 km^{2} (60.89 sq mi)
- Elevation: 1,103 m (3,619 ft)

Population (2010)
  - Total: 358
  - Density: 2.27/km^{2} (5.9/sq mi)
- Time zone: UTC+1 (CET)
  - Summer (DST): UTC+2 (CEST)
- Postal Code: 24994
- Telephone prefix: 987
- Website: Ayto. de Burón

Burón (Spanish pronunciation: [buˈɾon]) is a municipality located in the province of León, Castile and León, Spain. According to the 2010 census (INE), the municipality has a population of 358 inhabitants.

One partially submerged town of the greater community of “comarca de la Montaña de Riaño” where there is now a water reservoir called “Embalse de Riaño” near one of the reservoir's water sources “Río Elsa”.
