= Enrique Normand =

Spanish footballer

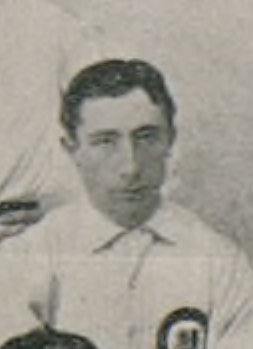

Personal information
- Full name: Enrique Normand Faurie
- Date of birth: 4 December 1885
- Place of birth: Valladolid, Castile and León, Spain
- Date of death: 14 October 1955 (aged 69)
- Place of death: Madrid, Spain
- Position: Midfielder

Senior career*
| Years | Team | Apps | (Gls) |
| 1901–1902 | Sky Football club | | |
| 1902–1909 | Madrid FC | | |
| 1909 | FC Barcelona | | |
| 1909–1915 | Madrid FC | | |
| 1915–19?? | Stade Français | | |
- * Club domestic league appearances and goals

Enrique Normand Faurie (4 December 1885 – 14 October 1955) was a Franco-Spanish footballer who played as a midfielder. He was a historic player for Real Madrid (then known as Madrid Football Club) during the 1900s and 1910s, playing with the club for 13 years, and winning the Copa del Rey four times in a row, between 1905 and 1908. After he retired he settled in Seville, where he was a director of Real Betis.

He was also an industrial engineer at the service of the Spanish Treasury, spending a few years in Barcelona as a Treasury delegate and inspector.

== Biography ==
Normand was born in Valladolid to French parents. His family moved and settled in Madrid when he was still young. Enrique —or Henri in his French-speaking term by which he was also known—, was an industrial engineer and worked as a civil servant for the Spanish Treasury. He developed an interest in football in his youth, becoming one of the best football players in his school, and soon enough he became one of the first football personalities of the capital. Normand was one of the enthusiastic footballers that joined and played for Sky Foot-ball club, the first club to ever existed in the capital, however, in 1900, a conflict between Sky Football members caused some of them to leave (including Normand) and create a new club, Madrid Football Club, currently known as Real Madrid CF, with the official creation of the club being held on 6 March 1902 in the back room of Al Capricho, a meeting in which he was present, thus being one of the founders of Madrid FC.

He then become one of the first footballers of the newly formed Madrid FC, playing as a midfielder with them for the next decade. Normand was thus part of the historic Madrid team; which also included Federico Revuelto, Antonio Neyra and fellow Franco-Spanish Pedro Parages; that played in the first-ever Copa del Rey in 1903, featuring in the final where they were beaten 2–3 by Athletic Club. He then played an important role in the club's four successive Copa del Rey titles between 1905 and 1908. In the same way, and being the tournament that gave access to the Copa del Rey, he won a total of five regional championships in the central region. He won a total of nine official titles during his career.

He also played two matches for FC Barcelona in 1909, the first of which was a competitive match against Español de Madrid in the semifinals of the 1909 Copa del Rey on 5 April, which was common at the time when teams often used reinforcements in matches of the aforementioned championship, being the opposite case to that experienced by José Quirante and Charles Wallace in the previous year, when belonging to Barcelona they played a match in the Madrid ranks. The second match he played for Barça was a friendly against the loser of the other semifinal, Athletic Club, before the team returned to Barcelona, and Normand, to Madrid, from where he did not leave until 1915, when he left to join Stade Français, where he spent a brief spell before ending his career.

After he retired he settled in Seville, where he was a director of Real Betis.

== Honours ==
=== Club ===
Madrid FC

- Centro Championship:
  - Champions (5): 1904–05, 1905–06, 1906–07, 1907–08 and 1912–13
- Copa del Rey:
  - Champions (5): 1905, 1906, 1907 and 1908
  - Runner-up (1): 1903

== See also ==
- List of Real Madrid CF players
