= Enrique Allende =

Spanish businessman and politician

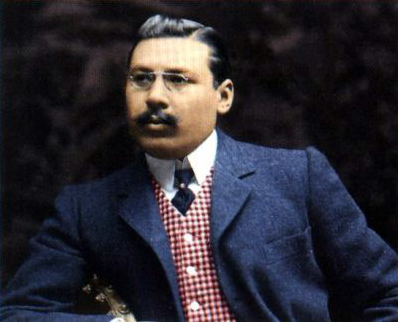
- Born: Enrique Timoteo Allende Allende; 24 January 1877; Bilbao, Basque Country, Spain
- Died: 4 January 1931 (aged 53); Madrid, Spain
- Occupations: Businessman; Politician
- Known for: President of Atlético Madrid

1st President of Atlético Madrid
- In office 26 April 1903 – 1903
- Succeeded by: Eduardo de Acha

Deputy of Riaño
- In office 3 December 1905 – 14 April 1910
- Preceded by: Antonio Molleda y Melcón

Enrique Timoteo Allende Allende (24 January 1877 – 4 January 1931) was a Spanish businessman and politician, who became a deputy of Riaño between 1905 and 1910 for the Conservative Party. Allende was a lawyer by profession and owner of several iron mines. He is best known, however, for being the very first president of the football club Atlético Madrid in 1903.

== Early life and education ==
Allende was born on 24 January 1877 in Bilbao, as the son of Tomás Allende, one of the industrial promoters of the Sabero coal company and senator for León in 1896. After obtaining the degree on Doctor of Law from the University of Salamanca, he began a similar activity to that of his father, developing business projects in León, where he obtained the concession of a narrow gauge railway in 1900 and through participation in the Railway of the Sociedad Oeste de Sabero.

Allende was a lawyer by profession and owner of several iron mines.

== Sporting career ==
On 26 April 1903, a Basque colony of students from the Escuela Superior de Minas led by Eduardo de Acha met the representatives of Athletic Club, who had just won the 1903 Copa del Rey Final, to request permission to create the club's Madrid branch, Athletic Club, an idea that was very well received, and thus, Athletic de Madrid was born. Despite the insistence of the rest of the founders to elect Acha president, he instead opted for the 32-year-old Allende to become the club's first president due to his comfortable economic situation, thus acting as patron of the club. However, Allende did not meet the expectations that were held of him; he soon got tired and stopped showing much interest in football, so he resigned in the fall of that same year, and Acha assumed the presidency.

== Politic career ==
In 1905 he was elected deputy in Cortes for the district of Riaño (Province of León) as part of the Conservative Party, a position he would hold until 1910.

== Death ==
Allende died in Madrid on 4 January 1931, at the age of 53.
