= Tiro del Pichón =

Football pitch in Madrid, Spain

Tiro del Pichón / Retiro / de la Rana
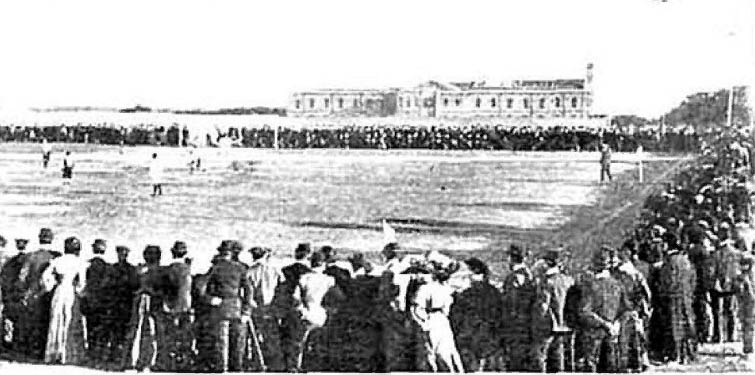
- Location: Madrid, Spain

Construction
- Opened: 1901
- Closed: 1913
- Demolished: 1913

Tenants
- Real Madrid (1901–1902); Atlético Madrid (1902–1913)

Tiro del Pichón (Spanish: Pigeon Hit), also known as Campo del Retiro (Retiro), or Campo de la Rana (Spanish: Frogs Field), was the first football pitch of Real Madrid between 1901 and 1902. They were not an official club at that time, playing friendly games on this field. Meetings were held there until 1903, the date the entity moved to the Campo de Jorge Juan.

The main team at this stadium was Atlético Madrid. They used this field between 1902 and 1913 before moving to Campo de O'Donnell from 1913 to 1923. Atlético Madrid's Campo de O'Donnell had the same name as Real Madrid's Campo de O'Donnell for 10 years because their locations were very close to each other, less than 200 meters on the main boulevard called Calle de O'Donnell.

Tiro del Pichón hosted three Spanish Cup finals: 1904, 1905, and 1910.

== Madrid FC ==
The field was a piece of land behind the walls of the Parque del Buen Retiro in Madrid between the Frontón del Retiro and the now-extinct Pigeon Shooting Range, in which players who had left New Foot-Ball Club played some games before officially becoming Madrid FC on 6 March 1902, later moving to the esplanade next to the Goya bullring (now the Palacio de Deportes), a piece of land that is now the Campo de Jorge Juan. From then on it was the Athletic Madrid (Athletic Club branch) who began to play their matches there, from 1903 to 1913.

== Lay out ==
The land was practically for public use and was sometimes used as a space for military training. It was also used to practice other sports and even a young Juan de la Cierva tested the prototypes of what would be the autogyro. The field was not fenced, so there was no separation between the players and the public, but it had a deep ditch around it to prevent the garbage carts pulled by oxen from accessing the pitch to dump waste. The playing field was smoothed by the players themselves, who arrived early to paint the lines of the field and carry the goals on their shoulders, which they had to fix on the ground to be able to play their matches. Likewise, due to the unevenness of the playing field, the field became flooded on rainy days, so they had to reduce the water by opening ditches that served as drainage. The laundry and ironing of the kits were done in the house of Mrs. María and her son Casimiro, located next to the field, who left a room for the referee's night and provided a jar with water for the players to wash. Thanks to the increase in football fans, they set up their small business serving soft drinks with lemon syrup and barley water at 10 cents a glass (the gossips said that it was the dirty water from the jar). Despite these circumstances, at that time it was the best football field in Madrid.

== Athletic Madrid ==
On 2 May 1903, coinciding with the commemoration of the Dos de Mayo Uprising, Athletic Madrid played their very first match between the 25 members that formed it, except for the treasurer Enrique Goiri who acted as referee. The players were divided into two teams of 12 so as not to leave anyone out and one team played in the official colors of Athletic Club at the time: a shirt with a dark blue stripe and the other white, black shorts and black socks and the other team dressed completely in white. The result was not recorded and is currently unknown.

On 20 November 1903, improvements were made to the pitch and the field premiered nets on the goals in a Madrid Championship match between Moncloa FC and Madrid FC that ended with a 3–1 victory for the former.

Tiro del Pichón hosted back-to-back Copa del Rey finals in 1904 and 1905. In the former, Athletic Bilbao were declared winners after their opponents, Club Español de Madrid, failed to turn up. On the other hand, the latter was played between Athletic and Madrid FC, ending in a 0–1 win to the Madrid side, courtesy of a late goal from Manuel Prast. In 1910, Tiro del Pichón hosted a third and last cup final, the 1910 FEF Copa del Rey Final, which ended with a dramatic last-minute winner from Pepe Rodríguez that sealed an epic comeback to FC Barcelona, winning 3–2 over Español de Madrid.

== Decline and Collapse ==
In 1912, Julián Ruete was elected president of the club and, given the increase in fans who wanted to see the team play, he built a new field. The Tiro del Pichón had an irregular playing field, with ditches around it and no fences, and moreover, the increase in the number of supporters meant a need for fences, as to avoid the authorities having to organize security measures every time a match was played. And so, a year later, Athletic de Madrid moved to Campo de O'Donnell.
