= Adolfo Wandosell =

Spanish footballer

Personal information
- Full name: Adolfo Lamberto Wandosell Calvache
- Date of birth: 14 April 1884
- Place of birth: La Unión, Murcia, Spain
- Date of death: 14 October 1955 (aged 71)
- Place of death: Madrid, Spain
- Positions: Defender; forward

Senior career*
| Years | Team | Apps | (Gls) |
| 1900–1902 | Alfonso XII College | | |
| 1902–1904 | Madrid FC | | |
| 1905–1909 | Sport Club of Cartagena | | |
| 1910–1911 | Orcelitana Sports Youth | | |
- * Club domestic league appearances and goals

Adolfo Lamberto Wandosell Calvache (14 April 1884 – 14 October 1955) was a Spanish footballer who played as a defender and later as a forward. He is best known for taking part in the very first line-up of Real Madrid (then known as Madrid FC) in 1902.

== Playing career ==
=== First years ===
Born in La Unión on 14 April 1884, he was baptized two days later in the church of Nuestra Señora del Rosario de Herrerías, belonging to the parish of Alumbres. At the turn of the century, the Wandosells spent some time in England. When the family returned to Spain, settling in the capital, Adolfo and his brother Pío, who had fallen in love with the sport of football back in England, began to play it in Spain, joining the fashion in which wealthy bourgeois were both managers and players.

During his stay in the city, he enrolled in the Royal Alfonso XII College (which was in the Monastery of El Escorial) to attend secondary education. At the turn of the century, football was still an unknown sport for most of the population of Madrid, but, coincidentally, the Alfonso XII College was a place where this sport enjoyed growing popularity. Adolfo Wandosell and his brothers Pío and Julio began to play football at recess and become familiar with the sport. The Wandosell brothers must have shown great skills in playing football, as both Adolfo and Paco were part of the Colegio's football team. Notably, the regulations of this team prohibited tackles in order to avoid the danger of falls and injuries.

=== Madrid FC ===
The quality of the Wandosell brothers did not go unnoticed by Madrid FC, who recruited them at the end of 1901. Adolfo and Pío played in the club's very first match on 9 March 1902, playing under the names Wandosell I and Wandosell II in order to distinguish themselves and avoid confusion in the chronicles. On 12 August 1903, on the occasion of the Patron Saint Festivities of El Escorial, the City Council of this town organized a football match between Madrid FC and Moncloa FC, and Wandosell occupied the defense position in an 8–0 win.

On 11 October 1903, the Board of Directors of Madrid FC holds a meeting in which a new board of directors is unanimously appointed, which will be chaired by Carlos Padrós. Adolfo Wandosell was elected one of its members at a time when it was common for players to be members of club boards. The first decision of the new rectors was to organize a regional championship that had as prizes a silver cup presented by King Alfonso XIII and 11 gold medals donated by the Marquis of Argüelles. On 1 November, Wandosell aligned himself with a group of students from the Colegio de los Padres Agustinos and the María Cristina University, in a match against Madrid FC, the club of which he was a player and manager. He did it because he was a student at the University. The match ended with a 4–1 victory for Madrid FC. Once again, the chronicler distinguished Adolfo Wandosell as one of the best players of the match.

=== Cartagena ===
When the Wandosell family moved to Cartagena in 1905, football was practiced in this city sporadically and somewhat disorganized. Wandosell was not part of the squad of any Cartagena team, although he participated in the most important matches that were played in the city during this decade. The Sport Club, the most representative team in Cartagena, demanded the presence of the Wandosell brothers on special occasions when they faced more experienced rivals. Likewise, he played charity matches. In Cartagena, he changed his position on the field, because while in Madrid he had played in defense and midfield, he now lined up as a striker. On 20 January 1907, for the first time in history, a team from Cartagena (the Sport Club) faced a team from another city (the Lorca Foot Ball Club). The Board of Directors of the Sport Club made a selection of the best players available in the city, although several of them did not belong to the squad. Thus, the Wandosell brothers played in a 1–1 draw.

Finally, and when there were only a few minutes left to finish the match, Cartagena's team managed to add a new goal and then another, both centered by Adolfo Wandosell, a center forward like few others, who plays as he wants.

— Alicante newspaper

On 3 March 1907, the Wandosell brothers played in a game between two teams of Sport Club players (white v red) for the benefit of the dismissed elderly workers of Arsenal. The event was a success, gathering many members of Cartagena's high society, including the Captain General of the Maritime Department and the city's mayor. On 23 February 1908, the Sport Club of Cartagena faced for the first time a team from another province: the Sportman's Club Lucentino from Alicante (The footballers from Alicante, who traveled by steamboat, took 21 hours to reach Cartagena). Adolfo netted twice with just a few minutes from the end, to help his side to a 3–1 victory. In 1907 tragedy struck the Wandosell family when Pío, Adolfo's younger brother, died after an illness at the age of twenty-six.

The death of his brother and the inability of his father to attend to the businesses he had in Orihuela led Adolfo to leave Cartagena and move to Orihuela to take over the businesses that his father had there, but he lived in Cartagena and continued to play football as a striker for a local team. He played in the region's first-ever international match against Orannais FC of Oran (Algeria) on 31 October 1909 on the Ensanche pitch. The Cartagena team fielded eight British players, but despite the massive presence of British players, Adolfo Wandosell still had a place in the starting eleven, indicating that he was considered one of the best footballers in the city. A few months after this match was played, Adolfo Wandosell moved his home to Orihuela, the town where he lived until his death.

== Later life ==
Between 1909 and 1910, he directed several electric lighting installations in Orihuela for decorative purposes, such as that of the main altar of the church of Santiago Apóstol or that of the streets to celebrate the carnival. On 26 June 1909, he conducted some official tests of the artistic electric lighting of many thousands of electric lamps, topped by the red cross of Santiago, a work that Wandosell technically directed with the workers under his command. In 1910 he settled in Orihuela and set up his own business: a modern wood factory on Calle Unión Agrícola, near the Glorieta. On 21 August 1910, several athletes from the town founded the Orcelitana Sports Youth, a society that accommodated various sports, including football. In 1911 he became the president of the society, and although his tenure in office was brief (Ángel Castelló replaced him shortly thereafter), he continued to be linked to the club as Honorary President and patron. In 1912 Adolfo Wandosell donated an art object to the winner of a match between the Orcelitana Sports Youth and the Espinardo FC. This meeting was held on the occasion of the Fiestas de Orihuela, and the second anniversary of the foundation of the Orcelitana SY.

In 1911 he entered politics as a councilor of the Orihuela City Council, and two years later, on 26 November 1913, the Minister of the Interior appointed him as mayor of Orihuela, in a move surrounded by controversy. The ordinary session of 4 December 1913, in which he took possession of the Mayor's Office, was not attended by either the liberal councilors or the conservatives. Even so, he was confirmed in the position and remained until February 1915.

On 20 March of that same year, having just left the mayor's office, he married the Marchioness of Arneva in Murcia, Ms. Mercedes Echevarría y Carvajal. The "wealthy owner" thus entered the nobility. After at least two girls were born, Mercedes and Dolores, on 10 December 1924, the heir to the title arrived in the birth of twins; Concepción and Adolfo. The Marquis of Arneva was a provincial deputy for the Orihuela between 1919 and 1921, and in January 1928 he was rumored as a possible candidate for the Civil Government of Alicante. His political career lasted until the municipal elections of April 1931 in which the Spanish Second Republic was proclaimed.
