= Manuel Prast =

Spanish footballer and referee (1886–1973)

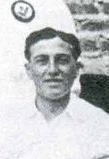

Personal information
- Full name: Manuel Prast Rodríguez de Llano
- Date of birth: 10 November 1886
- Place of birth: Madrid, Castilla la Nueva, Spain
- Date of death: 1 December 1973 (aged 87)
- Place of death: Madrid, Spain
- Position: Striker

Senior career*
Years	Team	Apps	(Gls)
1904–1908	Madrid FC	10	(6)
1909–1910	Vasconia SC	1	(0)
1911–1914	Madrid FC	1	(0)
- * Club domestic league appearances and goals

Manuel Prast Rodríguez de Llano (10 November 1886 – 1 December 1973) was a footballer who played as a striker for Madrid FC between 1904 and 1908, and 1911 and 1914. He was a historical member of Madrid FC, playing a pivotal role in Madrid's four back-to-back Copa del Rey titles between 1905 and 1908, playing in all the finals and scoring in three of them, including the winning goals in the finals of 1905 and 1907 and a brace in 1906. After retiring he become a referee and he was also an entrepreneur and owner of the family business called Confitería Prast, a confectionery founded by his father and which he took care of together with his brothers.

Although history seems to have blurred the legend of Prast, he was one of the most important footballers in the amateur beginnings of Madrid FC, being one of the main architects of the team's football power in the 1900s and being the club's all-time top scorer at the time of his retirement in 1914, before being surpassed by several of his contemporaries such as Santiago Bernabéu.

== Playing career ==
After being constantly linked to the neighbouring society of the Moncloa Football Club, on whose board of directors was his brother Carlos, the future mayor of Madrid, he was instead one of the first members of the (Society) Madrid Football Club. He was one of the main architects behind the team's football power in the 1900s, and was also one of the club's first goalscoring figures, becoming its all-time top scorer. He remained loyal to the club until he retired in 1914. (Note: In the 1911–12 season, the chronicles about the footballer are lost, the reason being unknown. The possible hypotheses were for doing military service, or for finishing his studies in England or France like all his brothers, since it was usual for it to happen at the time, or simply for dedicating himself to the family business.)

He was a member of the historic Madrid FC side of the 1900s, which also included José Berraondo, Pedro Parages, the Yarza brothers (Manuel and Joaquín) and Federico Revuelto. Prast scored 6 goals in the Copa del Rey, the most important of which coming in the 1905 Copa del Rey Final when he netted the only goal of the match to assure the first title in the club's history. He also scored twice in the 1906 Copa del Rey Final and again the only goal of the 1907 Copa del Rey Final, thus contributing decisively in Madrid's four consecutive Copa del Rey titles. He won a total of five regional championships in the central region (the tournament that gave access to the national cup) for a total of nine official titles during his career.

He also played three matches for Real Sociedad in the 1909–10 season including one Copa del Rey match, which was the final of the 1910 Copa del Rey (UECF) against Athletic Bilbao (Real Sociedad participated under the umbrella of a local club, Vasconia Sporting Club, due to regulations of the time) but unlike in his Madrid days, Prast was unable to impact the game and his side lost 1–0 thanks to a goal from Remigio Iza. The remaining two matches came in the inaugural edition of the Pyrenees Cup, featuring in the semi-finals against Stade toulousain at Ondarreta Stadium on 17 April as they won 8–0, and though they lost the final 2–1 to FC Barcelona, it was he who scored Sociedad's consolation goal in the 30th minute after a pass from George McGuinness.

== Refereeing career ==
After retiring, Prast became a football referee, being among the 5 men who formed the College of Referees of the Central Regional Federation, which was the first College of Referees in Spain. He and Julián Ruete, among others, were the members of its constitution on 15 April 1914, with Prast being elected as the College's first president. However, he resigned from the position just a few weeks later, on 9 May, to become one of the first category referees, and whose most important task was to referee the matches of the Central Championship, and if available, the Copa del Rey. In fact, he came to referee the decisive tiebreaker match of the 1913 Copa del Rey Final (FEF) between Racing Club de Irún and Athletic Club, which ended in a 1–0 victory to Irun.

== Honours ==
Real Madrid

- Campeonato Regional Centro: 1904–05, 1905–06, 1906–07, 1907–08, 1912–13
- Copa del Rey: 1905, 1906, 1907, 1908
