= 1904 Copa del Rey final =

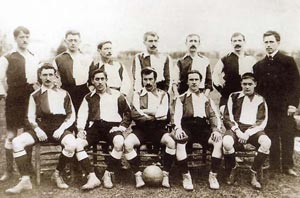
- Athletic Bilbao, champion
- Event: 1904 Copa del Rey
| Athletic Bilbao | Club Español de Madrid |
- Date: 27 March 1904
- Venue: Hipódromo, Madrid

The 1904 Copa del Rey final was the second final of the Copa del Rey. It was supposed to be played in 1904 in Madrid. This edition was notable for its chaotic development and because Athletic Bilbao won the trophy without playing a game after their opponents failed to turn up.

== Match details ==
27 March 1904

| Athletic Bilbao | not played | Club Español de Madrid |

Tiro del Pichón, Madrid

Athletic Bilbao automatically qualified for the final.

Club Español de Madrid had tied one game and had not completed the other game in 1904 Copa del Rey, so on the eve of the final, the newly arrived Bilbao players were asked to wait for just a few days until the Madrid champion was decided, but Bilbao's captain Juan Astorquia refused to do so without even flinching, and therefore, the people of Bilbao showed up at eleven in the morning at the Español de Madrid field to play the final. Faced with this problem and unable to quickly solve the case, coupled with the rush of players from the Basque club to return to their occupations, the Madrid Association decided to award the cup to Athletic as defending champions. Then the Bilbao players sang the alirón and returned home.
