= 1905 Copa del Rey =

3rd Copa del Rey

Tournament details
- Country: Spain
- Teams: 3

Final positions
- Champions: Madrid FC (1st title)
- Runners-up: Athletic Bilbao

Tournament statistics
- Matches played: 2
- Goals scored: 4 (2 per match)
- Top goal scorer(s): (Spain) Antonio Alonso (Spain) Manuel Prast (2 goals each)

The Copa del Rey 1905 was the 3rd staging of the Copa del Rey, the Spanish football cup competition.

The competition started on 16 April 1905, and concluded on 20 April 1905, with the last group stage match, in which Madrid FC lifted the trophy for the first time ever with two victories over San Sebastián Recreation Club and Athletic Bilbao. The three teams entered in the competition disputed the tournament by playing against each other in two games, with a third not played.

As the Catalonia championship was unfinished, Catalonia could not send a participant.

== Qualification Match ==
2 April 1905

Madrid FC	2–0	Moncloa FC
Federico Revuelto; Pedro Parages	Report1; Report2

Tiro del Pichón, Madrid
Referee: (Spain) Javier Prado

Note: The match was abandoned in the 35th minute with Madrid leading 2–0 after Moncloa walked off to protest the officiating of Prado.

== Group Stage Matches ==
16 April 1905

Madrid FC	3–0	San Sebastián Recreation Club
Manuel Prast 20'; Antonio Alonso 30', 90'	Report

Tiro del Pichón, Madrid
Referee: (Spain) Javier Prado

18 April 1905

Madrid FC	1–0	Athletic Bilbao
Manuel Prast 70'	Report

Tiro del Pichón, Madrid
Referee: (England) Forster

20 April 1905

Athletic Bilbao	Not played	San Sebastián Recreation Club

Tiro del Pichón, Madrid

Teams	Played	Won	Drawn	Lost	GF	GA	Pts
Madrid FC	2	2	0	0	4	0	4
Athletic Bilbao	1	0	0	1	0	1	0
San Sebastián	1	0	0	1	0	3	0

Copa del Rey 1905 Winners
Madrid FC
1st Title
