= Moncloa Football Club =

Football club in Spain active between 1902 and 1907

- Full name: Moncloa Football Club
- Short name: Moncloa FC
- Founded: April 1902
- Dissolved: 1907
- Ground: Moncloa Field
- Chairman: Antonio Alba
- League: Centro championship
Home colours	Away colours

The Moncloa Football Club was a football team based in Madrid, Spain, which was founded in April 1902 and dissolved in 1907 after being absorbed by Madrid FC. Moncloa FC was only the third football club to have been founded in the Spanish capital, and together with Madrid FC, it was the only team who participated in the first three editions of the Centro championship, achieving two back-to-back runner-up finishes in 1903–04 and 1904–05, losing the respective finals to Español de Madrid and Madrid FC. Despite its early success, however, the club was subjected to an early disappearance in 1907.

The club disputed its matches in a field located at the end of Argüelles, in the district of Moncloa-Aravaca, and also played some matches at the Hipódromo de la Castellana (Madrid FC's field at the time) as there were hardly any fields in Spain. As clothing, the club wore a dark blue shirt.

== History ==
=== Beginnings ===
Moncloa Foot-Ball Club was founded in the spring of 1902, a time when football was beginning to become popular in the city and give rise to numerous football societies. The club emerged in the district of Moncloa, one of the historical football areas of Madrid, as just the third existing club in the capital only after Madrid FC and Club Español de Madrid (1901).

A few months after its foundation, in August 1902, Moncloa was invited to take part in the festivities at El Escorial, and part of the program featured a match between them and Madrid FC, which was held on 11 August, and the clash ended in a dramatic 6–5 score to Madrid, who thus won its second ever piece of silverware (two ceramic plates) in its history, having already won the Copa de la Gran Peña, the consolation trophy of the 1902 Copa de la Coronación.

In December 1902, Moncloa FC participated, together with the rest of the Madrid clubs at the time, in the Concurso de Bandas, which was the forerunner of the aforementioned Centro Championship, which began in next year in 1903. In it, Moncloa wanted to take revenge on Madrid FC after losing the first trophy at El Escorial, but they failed to do so as the match ended with a resounding 0–8 victory to Madrid, who came out winners of the tournament after comfortably beating the remaining opponents.

=== Moncloa-Hispania relationship ===
In March 1903, a meeting held in Mancloa established the club's board of directors as follows: President, Francisco Borbón; Vice President, Joaquín García Borés; Treasurer, Alonso Colmenares; Secretary, Jesús González; Members: Salvador Navarro, Francisco Arechavala, Juan Danis, Julián Vals and Ezequiel Romero; Head of material, Lorenzo Carrasco. It seems that the reason for holding that meeting was to reflect a recent change in society, presumably a merge with a club called Hispania Football Club (a club founded in 1902), since in future matches the club is ruled in the chronicles as Hispania Athletic, but this merge was short-lived, thus prompting another general meeting on June, in which Antonio Alba was named the club's president; Emilio Bueno as vice president; Jesús González staying as the club's secretary, and new members such as Carlos Prast, Antonio Gamero and Francisco Bueno. The later news of this Hispania team is also unknown. (Note: The foundation date or references to this Hispania or the other are scarce or null, making it difficult to verify or affirm data. However, in 1907, both are cited as part of the members who went to strengthen various teams, such as the Spanish Gymnastic Society, leading to the disappearance of the club, or both.) The club's progress, however, was not as stable as expected, but the team was reinforced in the summer of 1903 thanks to the arrival of several dissent players of Madrid FC.

=== Centro Championships ===
Moncloa was one of the four teams that played in the inaugural Centro Championship in 1903, in which they faced Madrid FC again, plus Iberia Football Club and Moderno FC. This time, Moncloa was able to achieve their revenge on Madrid, beating them 1–3 on 20 December 1903, but they still failed to win the title as they drew (0–0) and lost (1–3) to the future champion, Moderno FC, finishing in the third position behind Madrid FC who got second.

The Madrid representative for the Copa del Rey was chosen through a Qualifying Contest after the end of the Madrid Championship, and the honor finally fell to Madrid FC as it was the only club entitled to play in the tournament, although it remains unclear why only Madrid FC entered the Qualifying Contest for the Copa del Rey.

In the 1903–04 season, Moncloa played again in the Centro Championship, and after beating Iberia FC 4–0 in the semi-finals, they played the final against Club Español de Madrid, in a match held on 27 March 1904. Español were winning 1–0 when by chance their defender Hermúa was injured. He was diagnosed with a broken tibia and fibula. The referee then decided to suspend the match, at which point Español claimed the victory.

The following year, the club was once again runner-up in the Regional Championship after losing in the final (2–0) again against Madrid FC, in a match which only lasted 35 minutes as Moncloa left in protest at the performance of referee Prado, of Athletic Madrid.

In the 1906–07 edition of the regional tournament, Moncloa was set to face Iris in the semi-finals on 2 December 1906, but the match was never held and the tournament was then suspended due to faults in the regulations by the participants. This was the club's last recorded appearance before its disappearance in 1907.

=== Decline and Collapse ===
The owners of Moncloa began to lose interest in their team, which at the end of 1906 was going through a certain institutional crisis, and so, on 30 January 1907, Moncloa Football Club and its associates were officially and definitively absorbed by Madrid FC to strengthen itself in the face of the loss of footballers who left to form Athletic Club, the Madrid section of Bilbao's Athletic Club. However, some of the Moncloa players refused to join Madrid FC and instead went to other Madrid societies such as Iberia, as well as to found the football section of the Spanish Gymnastic Society. Madrid FC dissolved one of the first clubs in the capital, which for some moments was considered the second-best club in the town.

== Honours ==
- Campeonato Regional Centro:
  - Runners-up (2): 1904, 1905
