= 1925–26 FC Barcelona season =

27th season in existence of FC Barcelona

FC Barcelona
1925–26 season
- President: Joan Coma; Arcadi Balaguer
- Manager: Ralph Kirby
- Campionat de Catalunya: First
- Campionat d'Espanya: Champion

The 1925–26 season was the 27th season for FC Barcelona.

== Results ==
Friendly

25 December 1925	FC Barcelona	2 - 0	First Vienna FC	Barcelona
	Arnau; Samitier			Stadium: Camp de les Corts; Referee: Llovera

27 December 1925	FC Barcelona	1 - 4	First Vienna FC	Barcelona
	Planas			Stadium: Camp de les Corts; Referee: Llovera

1 January 1926	FC Barcelona	2 - 2	AC Sparta Praha	Barcelona
	Alcantara; Sagi			Stadium: Camp de les Corts; Referee: Llovera

6 January 1926	FC Barcelona	2 - 7	AC Sparta Praha	Barcelona
	Musteros 20' 61'			Stadium: Camp de les Corts; Referee: Llovera

2 February 1926	CE Júpiter	0 - 4	FC Barcelona	Barcelona
			Musteros; Sagi	Stadium: Club Esportiu Júpiter; Referee: Vilalta

21 January 1926	FC Barcelona	5 - 1	CA Osasuna	Barcelona
	Alcantara 15' 51' 68'; Arnau 65' 80'			Stadium: Camp de les Corts; Referee: Villena

7 March 1926	FC Barcelona	2 - 0	CD Castelló	Barcelona
	Musteros 65'; Arnau 52'			Stadium: Camp de les Corts; Referee: Comorera

14 March 1926	FC Barcelona	2 - 0	Atlètic de Sabadell	Barcelona
	Scarone; Ponsa			Stadium: Camp de les Corts; Referee: Peris

19 March 1926	CD Castelló	1 - 3	FC Barcelona	Castelló
			Planas	Stadium: Camp del Sequiol; Referee: Cosin

19 March 1926	FC Barcelona	4 - 3	Canet FC	Barcelona
	Escatx; A.Garcia			Stadium: Camp de les Corts; Referee: Bribian

25 March 1926	FC Barcelona	4 - 1	FC Gràcia	Barcelona
	Alcantara; Sagi; Pujadas; Piera			Stadium: Camp de les Corts; Referee: Castillo

28 March 1926	FC Barcelona	4 - 1	Gimnastic Valencia	Barcelona
	Alcantara; Sagi; Scarone			Stadium: Camp de les Corts; Referee: Villena

5 April 1926	Joventut Republicana	0 - 3	FC Barcelona	Barcelona
			Sagi; Scarone	Stadium: Lleida; Referee: Espelta

5 April 1926	CE Europa	5 - 3	FC Barcelona	Barcelona
			Ponsa; Just	Stadium: Europa; Referee: Baro

11 April 1926 Copa Compte de Lavern	CE Europa	1 - 2	FC Barcelona	Barcelona
			Samitier; Scarone	Stadium: Europa; Referee: Vilalta

18 April 1926	Flor de Lis	1 - 3	FC Barcelona	Barcelona
			Garcia; Scarone	Stadium: Manresa; Referee: Espelta

2 May 1926	FC Barcelona	3 - 3	CF Badalona	Barcelona
	Just; Scarone; Ramon			Stadium: Les Corts; Referee: Llovera

9 May 1926	FC Barcelona	1 - 2	Daring Brusselles	Barcelona
	Parera			Stadium: Les Corts; Referee: Marine

13 May 1926	FC Barcelona	1 - 2	Daring Brusselles	Barcelona
	Escaix			Stadium: Les Corts; Referee: Marine

24 May 1926	Seleccio Provincial Tarragona	1 - 7	FC Barcelona	Barcelona
				Stadium: Tarragona

30 June 1926	Terrassa FC	1 - 2	FC Barcelona	Barcelona
			Scarone; Papeli equip contrari	Stadium: Terrassa; Referee: Ribe

4 July 1926	UE Vic	0 - 2	FC Barcelona	Barcelona
			Ramon; Montesinos equip contrari	Stadium: Vic

5 July 1926	FC Gràcia	No data	FC Barcelona	Barcelona
				Stadium: Vic

25 July 1926	FC Palafrugell	1 - 5	FC Barcelona	Barcelona
			Scarone ?	Stadium: Palafrugell

Campionat de Catalunya

3 January 1926 Jornada 1	FC Barcelona	4 - 1	Terrassa FC	Barcelona
	Alcántara; Arnau; Carulla		Broto	Stadium: Camp de les Corts

10 January 1926 Jornada 2	CS Sabadell	2 - 1	FC Barcelona	Sabadell
	Bertrand; Zamora		Montaner (p.p.)	Stadium: Camp de la Creu Alta; Referee: Villena

17 January 1926 Jornada 3	FC Martinenc	1 - 7	FC Barcelona	Barcelona
	Sala		Arnau 1' 50'; Musterós 20'; Sagi; Alcántara	Referee: Villena

24 January 1926 Jornada 4	RCD Español	1 - 0	FC Barcelona	Barcelona
	Padrón			Stadium: Estadi de Sarrià; Referee: Murguia

31 January 1926 Jornada 5	FC Barcelona	3 - 1	CE Europa	Barcelona
	Arnau; Samitier		Cros	Stadium: Camp de les Corts; Referee: Steinborn

7 February 1926 Jornada 6	FC Barcelona	5 - 2	FC Gràcia	Barcelona
15:20	Arnau; Samitier; Sagi		Mejías; Orriols 60'	Stadium: Camp de les Corts; Referee: Vilalta

15 February 1926 Jornada 7	FC Barcelona	2 - 1	US Sants	Barcelona
	Planas; Sagi		Monleón	Stadium: Camp de les Corts; Referee: Montero

30 May 1926 Jornada 8	Terrassa FC	2 - 2	FC Barcelona	Terrassa
	Rediu 35'; Canals 40'		Samitier 11'

3 June 1926 Jornada 9	FC Barcelona	2 - 0	CS Sabadell	Barcelona
	Piera; Alcántara			Stadium: Camp de les Corts

6 June 1926 Jornada 10	FC Barcelona	1 - 0	FC Martinenc	Barcelona
	Sagi			Stadium: Camp de les Corts

13 June 1926 Jornada 11	FC Barcelona	3 - 0	RCD Español	Barcelona
	Samitier; Sagi			Stadium: Camp de les Corts

20 June 1926 Jornada 12	CE Europa	2 - 4	FC Barcelona	Barcelona
	Pelao 44'; Corbella 83'		Arnau 23'; Samitier; Piera 59'

24 June 1926 Jornada 13	FC Gràcia	1 - 1	FC Barcelona	Barcelona
	Sastre		Samitier	Referee: Arribas

27 June 1926 Jornada 14	US Sants	1 - 0	FC Barcelona	Barcelona
	Tonijuan 15'			Stadium: Camp del carrer Galileu

Campionat d'Espanya

28 February 1926 Jornada 1	FC Barcelona	5 - 0	Levante FC	Barcelona
	Sagi			Stadium: Camp de les Corts

14 March 1926 Jornada 3	CD Zaragoza	0 - 7	FC Barcelona	Zaragoza
			Musterós; Arnau; Alcántara; Carulla	Stadium: Torrero

21 March 1926 Jornada 4	Levante FC	1 - 4	FC Barcelona	València
	Urrutia		Arnau; Planas; Piera	Stadium: Estadi de Mestalla; Referee: Montero

4 April 1926 Jornada 6	FC Barcelona	3 - 0	CD Zaragoza	Barcelona
	García; Planas; Sagi			Stadium: Camp de les Corts; Referee: Llovera

18 April 1926 Quarts de final - anada	Real Madrid FC	1 - 5	FC Barcelona	Chamartín de la Rosa
	Monjardín		Samitier 19'; Piera	Stadium: Estadi de Chamartín; Attendance: 15.000; Referee: Calderón

25 April 1926 Quarts de final - tornada	FC Barcelona	10 - 0	Real Madrid FC	Barcelona
	Samitier			Stadium: Camp de les Corts; Attendance: 25.000

9 May 1926 Semifinals	FC Barcelona	2 - 1	Real Unión Club	Zaragoza
16:30	Samitier 47'; Alcántara 53'		Petit 12'	Stadium: Torrero; Referee: Sancho

16 May 1926 Final	FC Barcelona	3 - 2	Athletic Club de Madrid	València
17:30	Samitier 62'; Just 63'; Alcántara 112'		Palacios 16'; Vázquez 58'	Stadium: Estadi de Mestalla; Attendance: 17.000; Referee: Saracho
