= 1926–27 FC Barcelona season =

FC Barcelona
1926–27 season
- President: Arcadi Balaguer
- Manager: Romà Forns; Jack Domby
- Campionat de Catalunya: First
- Campionat d'Espanya: Semifinale

The 1926–27 season was the 28th season for FC Barcelona.

== Results ==
Friendly

5 September 1926	CE Europa	3 - 2	FC Barcelona	Barcelona
			Alcantara 20' 55'	Stadium: Guinardo; Referee: Castillo

8 September 1926	FC Barcelona	5 - 3	Unió Esportiva Sant Andreu	Barcelona
	Alcantara; Arnau; Miquel			Stadium: Villasar de Mar; Referee: Vilalta

12 September 1926	SD Huesca	2 - 2	FC Barcelona	Aragon
			Piera; Matifoll equip contrari	Stadium: Huesca; Referee: Lera

12 September 1926	Athletic del Turó	2 - 1	FC Barcelona	Barcelona
			Serra	Stadium: ? Referee: Lera

19 September 1926	Real Unión	2 - 2	FC Barcelona	Irun
			Samitier; Carulla	Stadium: Stadium Gal; Referee: Angoso

19 September 1926	FC Santboià	5 - 2	FC Barcelona	Barcelona
			Andreu; Borrell	Referee: Pare

20 September 1926	Real Unión	1 - 3	FC Barcelona	Irun
			Tonijuan 25'; Sastre 65'; Samitier 85'	Stadium: Stadium Gal; Referee: Angoso

24 September 1926	FC Barcelona	4 - 2	Wiener SC	Barcelona
	Sastre 9 25'; Samitier 47 57'			Stadium: Les Corts; Referee: Arribas

26 September 1926	FC Barcelona	1	Fc Real madrid	Barcelona
	Planas 22'			Stadium: Les Corts; Referee: Villena

12 October 1926	Sevilla FC	1 - 3	FC Barcelona	Sevilla
			Miquel; Olivella; Walter	Referee: Balaguer

12 October 1926	FC Gràcia	5 - 8	FC Barcelona	Barcelona
			Sagi 16'; Piera 25'; Sastre 32' 65' 81'; Sastre 43' 73'; Sastre 57'	Stadium: Gracia; Referee: Vilalta

13 October 1926	Sevilla FC	7 - 1	FC Barcelona	Sevilla
			Pedrol 89'	Referee: Villagran

25 October 1926	CE Júpiter	1 - 2	FC Barcelona	Barcelona
				Stadium: Valls

29 October 1926	Girona FC	1 - 6	FC Barcelona	Barcelona
			Carulla; Sagi; Sastre; Samitier	Stadium: Girona; Referee: Llovera

31 October 1926	FC Barcelona	3 - 1	Real Sociedad	Barcelona
	Sastre; Piera			Stadium: Les Corts; Referee: Llovera

1 November 1926	FC Barcelona	2 - 3	Real Sociedad	Barcelona
	Sagi 18'; Sastre 65'			Stadium: Les Corts; Referee: Vilalta

11 November 1926 aniversari armistici	Red Star FC	1 - 4	FC Barcelona	París
			Sagi 3' 75'; Sastre 30'; Samitier 41'	Stadium: Buffalo; Attendance: 25.000; Referee: Gerardin

12 November 1926	FC Martinenc	0 - 2	FC Barcelona	Barcelona
			Miquel 38'; A.Garcia 52'	Stadium: Sant Marti (stadium); Referee: Baonza

5 December 1926	FC Barcelona	0 - 1	SpVgg Greuther Fürth	Barcelona
				Stadium: Les Corts; Referee: Marine

8 December 1926	FC Barcelona	3 - 3	SpVgg Greuther Fürth	Barcelona
	Sancho 13'; Sastre 22' 90'			Stadium: Les Corts; Referee: Comorera

19 December 1926	FC Barcelona	6 - 0	CF Badalona	Barcelona
	Tonijuan; Sastre; Walter			Stadium: Les Corts; Referee: Marine

25 December 1926	FC Barcelona	4 - 1	Celta de Vigo	Barcelona
	Sastre 25'; Ramon 35' 40' 70'			Stadium: Les Corts; Referee: Vilalta

22 December 1926	FC Barcelona	1 - 2	Celta de Vigo	Barcelona
	Piera			Stadium: Les Corts; Referee: Villena

1 January 1927	FC Barcelona	2 - 3	Amateure	Barcelona
	Sastre 60'; Arnau 67'			Stadium: Les Corts; Referee: Comorera

2 January 1927	FC Barcelona	5 - 0	Amateure	Barcelona
	Sastre 16' 40' 58'; Samitier 37'; Piera 70'			Stadium: Les Corts; Referee: Peris

6 January 1927	FC Barcelona	5 - 0	Real Unión	Barcelona
	Sancho; Carulla; Samitier; Piera			Stadium: Les Corts; Referee: Vilalta

9 January 1927	FC Barcelona	3 - 2	Real Unión	Barcelona
	Samitier; Pedrol			Stadium: Les Corts; Referee: Llovera

2 February 1927	FC Barcelona	0 - 0	Real Madrid	Barcelona
				Stadium: Les Corts; Referee: Llovera

2 February 1927	Reus Deportiu	3 - 2	FC Barcelona	Barcelona
			Tonijuan; Miquel	Stadium: Reus; Referee: Palleja

2 March 1927 Copa Mas	RCD Espanyol	4 - 1	FC Barcelona	Barcelona
			Samitier	Stadium: Sarria; Referee: Brias

19 March 1927	Real Madrid	1 - 5	FC Barcelona	Madrid
			Pedrol; Samitier; Sagi	Stadium: Chamartín; Referee: Melcon

19 March 1927	FC Barcelona	1 - 1	SD Huesca	Barcelona
	Just 70'			Stadium: Les Corts; Referee: Comorera

20 March 1927	Real Madrid	1 - 4	FC Barcelona	Madrid
			Sastre 41'; Pedrol 50' 60'; Quesada 55' equip contrari	Stadium: Chamartín; Referee: Alonso

20 March 1927	FC Barcelona	1 - 1	Levante FC	Barcelona
	A.Garcia			Stadium: Les Corts; Referee: Villena

10 April 1927	CE Júpiter	1 - 1	FC Barcelona	Barcelona
			Parera 63'	Stadium: Poble Nou; Referee: Vela

17 April 1927	Club Lleida Esportiu	1 - 3	FC Barcelona	Barcelona
			Tonijuan	Stadium: Lleida; Referee: Rosello

18 April 1927	Club Lleida Esportiu	2 - 5	FC Barcelona	Barcelona
			Tonijuan; Miquel	Stadium: Lleida; Referee: Blanco

8 May 1927	FC Barcelona	sense dades	Gimnastic

22 May 1927 Copa Barcelona	FC Barcelona	2 - 2	Motherwell F.C.	Barcelona
	Walter; Samitier			Stadium: Les Corts; Referee: Comorera

5 June 1927	FC Barcelona	5 - 1	Peñarol	Barcelona
	Arocha; Samitier; Sagi; Piera			Stadium: Les Corts; Referee: Marine

6 June 1927	FC Barcelona	1 - 1	Peñarol	Barcelona
	Arocha			Stadium: Les Corts; Referee: Comorera

12 June 1927	UE Sants	3 - 0	FC Barcelona	Barcelona
				Stadium: Sants; Referee: Vidal

19 June 1927	FC Barcelona	5 - 2	UE Sants	Barcelona
	Samitier 15' 44'; Sagi 27' 57'; Ramon 40'			Stadium: Les Corts; Referee: Vela

24 June 1927	FC Barcelona	4 - 3	Arenas	Barcelona
	Arocha; Samitier; Walter			Stadium: Les Corts; Referee: Aramburo

26 June 1927	FC Barcelona	4 - 0	Arenas	Barcelona
	Arocha; Samitier; Sastre			Stadium: Les Corts; Referee: Comorera

29 June 1927	FC Barcelona	7 - 2	Gimnàstic Futbol Club	Barcelona
	Ramon; Parera; Andreu; Pujadas; Virgili equip contrari			Stadium: Les Corts; Referee: Pons

29 June 1927	FC Barcelona	2 - 1	Real Zaragoza	Barcelona
	Arocha 14' 19'			Stadium: Les Corts; Referee: Vela

3 July 1927 homenatge Alcantara	FC Barcelona	1 - 2	Combinat Espanyol	Barcelona
	Sastre 5'			Stadium: Les Corts; Referee: Villena

24 July 1927	FC Palafrugell	0 - 3	FC Barcelona	Barcelona
			Samitier; Sagi; Arocha	Stadium: Palafrugell; Referee: Sauri

Campionat de Catalunya

10 October 1926 Jornada 1	RCD Español	2 - 3	FC Barcelona	Barcelona
15:15	Oramas 39'		Alcántara 9'; Piera 47'; Sagi 74'	Stadium: Estadi de Sarrià

17 October 1926 Jornada 2	US Sants	1 - 4	FC Barcelona	Barcelona
15:10	Feliu 63'		Sastre 2'; Sagi; Samitier 52' 59'	Stadium: Camp del carrer Galileu

24 October 1926 Jornada 3	CS Sabadell	1 - 1	FC Barcelona	Sabadell
15:05	Tena II 38'		Samitier 28'	Stadium: Camp de la Creu Alta

24 October 1926 Jornada 4	FC Badalona	1 - 5	FC Barcelona	Badalona
14:55	Forgas 84'		Pedrol 12' 43'; Sastre 32' 40'; Samitier 55'

14 November 1926 Jornada 5	FC Barcelona	10 - 2	FC Gràcia	Barcelona
14:40	Sagi 6'; Piera 11' 52' 90'; Samitier 17'; Sastre; Alcántara		Sans 24'; Peidró 22'	Stadium: Camp de les Corts

21 November 1926 Jornada 6	FC Barcelona	6 - 1	Terrassa FC	Barcelona
14:35	Samitier 34' 65'; Pedrol 52'; Sastre 60'; Sagi 80'		Broto 39'	Stadium: Camp de les Corts; Referee: Vidal

28 November 1926 Jornada 7	FC Barcelona	5 - 0	CD Europa	Barcelona
14:30	Samitier; Mauri (p.p.)			Stadium: Camp de les Corts; Referee: Murguia

12 December 1926 Jornada 8	FC Barcelona	2 - 3	RCD Español	Barcelona
14:30	Sastre		Padrón; Mauri	Stadium: Camp de les Corts; Referee: Steinborn

16 January 1927 Jornada 10	FC Barcelona	7 - 0	CS Sabadell	Barcelona
14:55	Piera 5'; Pedrol 10' 32' 75'; Carulla 28'			Stadium: Camp de les Corts; Referee: Arribas

23 January 1927 Jornada 11	FC Barcelona	4 - 0	FC Badalona	Barcelona
15:05	Samitier; Cabo (p.p.); Sastre			Stadium: Camp de les Corts

30 January 1927 Jornada 12	FC Gràcia	1 - 3	FC Barcelona	Barcelona
	Sans		Sastre 2'; Samitier 12'; Torralba

6 February 1927 Jornada 9	FC Barcelona	4 - 3	US Sants	Barcelona
	Sagi; Walter 15'		Martínez Soligó 79'	Stadium: Camp de les Corts; Referee: Alonso

13 February 1927 Jornada 13	Terrassa FC	0 - 9	FC Barcelona	Terrassa
15:25			Sagi; Samitier; Sastre; Pedrol; Carulla

20 February 1927 Jornada 14	CD Europa	5 - 1	FC Barcelona	Barcelona
15:30	Alcázar 3'; Cros; Pellicer; Monleón		Samitier

Campionat d'Espanya

6 March 1927 Jornada 2	FC Barcelona	5 - 0	Real Murcia FC	Barcelona
	Piera; Pedrol; Samitier			Stadium: Camp de les Corts

13 March 1927 Jornada 3	València FC	2 - 0	FC Barcelona	València
15:45	Montes 57'; Sánchez 64'			Stadium: Camp de Mestalla; Attendance: 17.000; Referee: Menchaca (Asturias)

27 March 1927 Jornada 5	Real Murcia FC	1 - 2	FC Barcelona	Barcelona
	Castro 50'		Samitier 27'; Pedrol	Stadium: Campo de la Condomina; Referee: Martín

3 April 1927 Jornada 6	FC Barcelona	3 - 0	València FC	Barcelona
	Arnau; Piera; Sastre			Stadium: Camp de les Corts

17 April 1927 Quarts de final - anada	FC Barcelona	4 - 1	Real Betis Balompié	Barcelona
	Alcántara; Walter; Carulla		Carrasco	Stadium: Camp de les Corts; Referee: Arrate

24 April 1927 Quarts de final - tornada	Real Betis Balompié	1 - 0	FC Barcelona	Sevilla
	Carrasco 14'			Stadium: Campo del Patronato; Attendance: 7.000; Referee: Fernández (Castella i Lleó)

2 May 1927 Quarts de final - desempat	FC Barcelona	1 - 0	Real Betis Balompié	Madrid
	Samitier

8 May 1927 Semifinals	Arenas Club de Getxo	4 - 3	FC Barcelona	Zaragoza
	Yermo 10' 30' 91'; Anduiza		Sagi 25'; Samitier	Stadium: Campo de Torrero; Referee: Balaguer (Andalusia)
