= 1927–28 FC Barcelona season =

29th season in existence of FC Barcelona

FC Barcelona
1927–28 season
- President: Arcadi Balaguer
- Manager: Romà Forns
- Campionat de Catalunya: First
- Campionat d'Espanya: Champion
- Torneig dels Campions: First

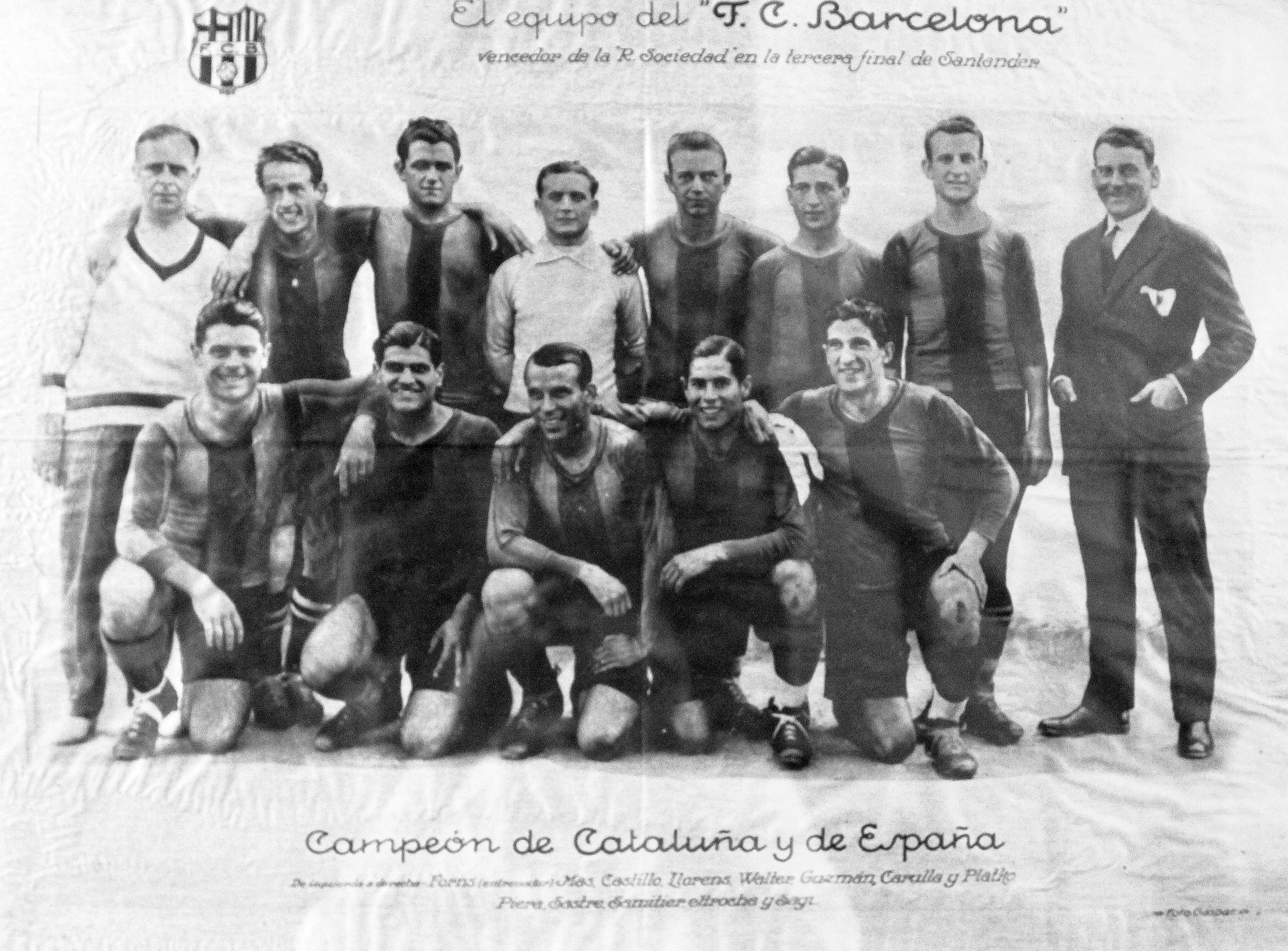
FC Barcelona team during the 1928-1929 season

The 1927–28 season was the 29th season for FC Barcelona.

== Results ==
Friendly

8 September 1927	UE Sants	1 – 2	FC Barcelona	Barcelona
			Segura; Ramon	Stadium: Sants; Referee: Pellicer

25 September 1927	CE Europa	2 – 1	FC Barcelona	Barcelona
			Sancho	Stadium: El Guinardó; Referee: Vilalta

8 December 1927	Zaragoza CD	1 – 3	FC Barcelona	Zaragoza
			Bosch; Arnau	Referee: Adrados

25 December 1927	FC Barcelona	5 – 2	FK Viktoria Žižkov	Barcelona
	Samitier 2' 20' 49'; Sagi 11'; Arocha 85'			Stadium: Les Corts; Referee: Villena

26 December 1927	FC Barcelona	1 – 0	FK Viktoria Žižkov	Barcelona
	Ramon 16'			Stadium: Les Corts; Referee: Arribas

8 January 1928 Avinguda de Catalunya	Gimnàstic Futbol Club	3 – 0	FC Barcelona	Barcelona
				Stadium: Tarragona; Referee: Villasevil

22 April 1928	FC Barcelona	4 – 1	Argentina	Barcelona
	Arocha			Stadium: Les Corts; Referee: Martinez

29 April 1928	FC Barcelona	4 – 2	Iluro SC	Barcelona
	Tonijuan; Pinilla; Segura; A.Garcia			Stadium: Les Corts

6 May 1928	CF Badalona	8 – 2	FC Barcelona	Barcelona
			Ramon; Borras equip contrari	Stadium: Badalona; Referee: Vilalta

6 May 1928	UE Figueres	4 – 3	FC Barcelona	Barcelona
			Altes; Segura; Tonijuan	Stadium: Figueres; Referee: Pujol

20 May 1928	FC Barcelona	1 – 4	Real Unión	Barcelona
	Segura			Stadium: Les Corts; Referee: Villena

27 May 1928 Torneo de Campeones	FC Barcelona	2 – 2	Real Madrid	Barcelona
	Ramon 6'; Arocha 58'		Benegas 23'; Esparza 80'	Stadium: Camp de les Corts; Referee: Vilalta

3 June 1928 Torneo de Campeones	Real Madrid	1 – 1	FC Barcelona	Chamartín de la Rosa
	Rubio 32'		Arocha 87'	Stadium: Estadi de Chamartín; Referee: Melcon

3 June 1928	FC Barcelona	4 – 0	Gimnàstic Futbol Club	Barcelona
	Ramon; Parera			Stadium: Les Corts; Referee: Sauri

10 June 1928	FC Barcelona	5 – 2	Royale Union Saint-Gilloise	Barcelona
	Sastre; Samitier; Arocha			Stadium: Les Corts; Referee: Llovera

12 June 1928	FC Barcelona	4 – 0	Royale Union Saint-Gilloise	Barcelona
	Ramon 18' 61'; A.Garcia 26'; Barcelo 78'			Stadium: Les Corts; Referee: Marine

17 June 1928	FC Barcelona	3 – 5	CE Europa	Barcelona
	Parera; Piera; Samitier			Stadium: Les Corts; Referee: Vilalta

24 June 1928	FC Barcelona	8 – 1	Unió Esportiva Sant Andreu	Barcelona
	Parera; A.Garcia; Pedrol; Parera II; Arnau			Stadium: Les Corts; Referee: Comorera

1 July 1928	FC Barcelona	3 – 1	UE Sants	Barcelona
	Samitiera; Sastre			Stadium: Les Corts; Referee: Comorera

4 August 1928	Argentina	3 – 1	FC Barcelona	Buenos Aires
			Samitiera

5 August 1928	Argentina	0 – 0	FC Barcelona	Buenos Aires

11 August 1928	Independiente de Avellaneda	4 – 1	FC Barcelona	Buenos Aires
			Regueiro

15 August 1928	River Plate	1 – 0	FC Barcelona	Buenos Aires

18 August 1928	Boca Juniors	1 – 2	FC Barcelona	Buenos Aires
			Sastre

19 August 1928	Lliga Rosarina	4 – 0	FC Barcelona	Rosario

26 August 1928	Peñarol	1 – 1	FC Barcelona	Montevideo
			Samitier

1 September 1928	Nacional	3 – 0	FC Barcelona	Montevideo

Torneig de Campions

9 September 1927	Real Unión	3 – 3	FC Barcelona	Irun
	Alza 3'; Echeveste 8'; Errazquin		Sastre 28'; Samitier 51'; Piera 59'	Stadium: Stadium Gal; Referee: Fausto Martín (Biscaia)

11 September 1927	Arenas	2 – 3	FC Barcelona	Getxo
	Gurruchaga 71'; Críspulo 87'		Samitier 19' 42'; Arocha 38'	Stadium: Estadio de Ibaiondo; Referee: Escartin

18 September 1927	FC Barcelona	2 – 1	Real Sociedad	Barcelona
	Arnau 6' 27'		Cholín	Stadium: Camp de les Corts; Referee: Vilalta

24 September 1927	FC Barcelona	6 – 3	Real Unión	Barcelona
	Sastre 13'; Samitier 15'; Walter 33'; Carulla; Arocha		Echeveste; Sagarzazu; Alza	Stadium: Camp de les Corts; Referee: Escartin

12 October 1927	FC Barcelona	4 – 1	Arenas	Barcelona
	Samitier 16'; Ramon 87'		Anduiza	Stadium: Camp de les Corts; Referee: Melcon

1 November 1927	FC Barcelona	3 – 1	Athletic Club	Barcelona
	Sastre 75' 90'; Parera 78'		Calero	Stadium: Camp de les Corts; Referee: Escartín

21 February 1928	Athletic Club	0 – 1	FC Barcelona	Bilbao
			Sastre	Stadium: Estadi de San Mamés; Referee: Escartin

19 March 1928	Real Sociedad	2 – 1	FC Barcelona	Sant Sebastià
	Yurrita; Kiriki		Piera	Stadium: Estadi d'Atotxa; Referee: Saracho

27 May 1928	FC Barcelona	2 – 2	Real Madrid	Barcelona
				Stadium: Camp de les Corts; Referee: Vilalta

3 June 1928	Real Madrid	1 – 1	FC Barcelona	Chamartín de la Rosa
				Stadium: Estadi de Chamartín; Referee: Melcon

Campionat de Catalunya

9 October 1927 Jornada 1	CD Europa	2 – 1	FC Barcelona	Barcelona
	Cros		Arocha	Stadium: Camp del Guinardó; Referee: Brias

16 October 1927 Jornada 2	FC Barcelona	6 – 0	US Sants	Barcelona
	Samitier; Ramon; García			Stadium: Camp de les Corts

23 October 1927 Jornada 3	FC Barcelona	3 – 1	CS Sabadell	Barcelona
	García 30'; Walter; Ramon 60'		Virgili 42'	Stadium: Camp de les Corts; Attendance: 45.000

30 October 1927 Jornada 4	Terrassa FC	0 – 1	FC Barcelona	Terrassa
			García 21'

6 November 1927 Jornada 5	FC Barcelona	6 – 1	FC Badalona	Barcelona
	Ramon 13' 60'; Sastre 16' 30' 71'; Arocha 58'		Forgas 50'	Stadium: Camp de les Corts

13 November 1927 Jornada 6	RCD Español	2 – 1	FC Barcelona	Barcelona
	Padrón; Estrada		Arocha	Stadium: Estadi de Sarrià; Referee: Melcon

20 November 1927 Jornada 7	FC Barcelona	9 – 1	FC Gràcia	Barcelona
	Walter; Carulla; Piera; Ramon; Sastre; García		Roig	Stadium: Camp de les Corts; Referee: Ribé

27 November 1927 Jornada 8	FC Barcelona	3 – 2	CD Europa	Barcelona
	Samitier; García		Bestit; Ciordia	Stadium: Camp de les Corts; Referee: Villena

4 December 1927 Jornada 9	US Sants	1 – 6	FC Barcelona	Barcelona
	Goal		Ramon; Piera; Samitier; Arocha	Stadium: Camp del carrer Galileu; Referee: Mariné

11 December 1927 Jornada 10	CS Sabadell	0 – 4	FC Barcelona	Sabadell
			Ramon; Arocha; Samitier	Stadium: Camp de la Creu Alta

18 December 1927 Jornada 11	FC Barcelona	3 – 0	Terrassa FC	Barcelona
	Arnau; Sastre			Stadium: Camp de les Corts

1 January 1928 Jornada 12	FC Badalona	0 – 4	FC Barcelona	Badalona
			Sastre; Arnau; Parera

15 January 1928 Jornada 13	FC Barcelona	2 – 1	RCD Español	Barcelona
	Samitier; Arocha		Vilar	Stadium: Camp de les Corts; Referee: Menchaca

22 January 1928 Jornada 14	FC Gràcia	0 – 7	FC Barcelona	Barcelona
			Samitier; Ramon; Arocha

29 January 1928 Desempat	FC Barcelona	1 – 0	CD Europa	Barcelona
	Ramon			Stadium: Camp de les Corts; Referee: Martín

Campionat d'Espanya

5 February 1928 Jornada 1	FC Barcelona	4 – 1	Iberia SC	Barcelona
	García 20'; Arnau; Samitier		Echenique	Stadium: Camp de les Corts; Referee: Montero (Madrid)

12 February 1928 Jornada 2	FC Barcelona	4 – 1	Real Sociedad de Fútbol	Barcelona
	Sastre; Sagi; Samitier		Goal	Stadium: Camp de les Corts; Referee: Vallana Jeanguenat (Biscaia)

19 February 1928 Jornada 3	CD Europa	2 – 3	FC Barcelona	Barcelona
	Xifreu; Alcázar		Samitier; Castillo; Sastre	Stadium: Camp del Guinardó; Referee: Escartín Morán (Madrid)

26 February 1928 Jornada 4	CD Patria Aragón	1 – 3	FC Barcelona	Zaragoza
	Lakatos 35'		Ramon 10'; Arocha 22' 30'	Referee: Murguia

4 March 1928 Jornada 5	FC Barcelona	4 – 4	Real Unión Club	Barcelona
	Samitier 78'; Piera 55'		Regueiro 28'; Errazquin; Alza	Stadium: Camp de les Corts; Attendance: 45.000; Referee: Montero (Madrid)

11 March 1928 Jornada 6	Iberia SC	0 – 1	FC Barcelona	Zaragoza
			Mas	Stadium: Campo de Torrereo

18 March 1928 Jornada 7	Real Sociedad de Fútbol	5 – 4	FC Barcelona	Sant Sebastià
	Cholín 41'; Mariscal; Yurrita		Piera; Sastre; Mas	Stadium: Estadi d'Atotxa; Attendance: 15.000; Referee: Vallana Jeanguenat (Biscaia)

25 March 1928 Jornada 8	FC Barcelona	2 – 2	CD Europa	Barcelona
	Samitier; Arocha		Alcázar; Peidró	Stadium: Camp de les Corts; Referee: Saracho

1 April 1928 Jornada 9	FC Barcelona	7 – 0	CD Patria Aragón	Barcelona
	Arnau; Samitier; Walter; Sastre; Piera			Stadium: Camp de les Corts

8 April 1928 Jornada 10	Real Unión Club	2 – 3	FC Barcelona	Irun
	Platko (p.p.); Sagarzazu 60'		Samitier 8' 39'; Sastre	Stadium: Stadium Gal; Referee: Montero (Madrid)

15 April 1928 Quarts de final – anada	FC Barcelona	7 – 3	Real Oviedo FC	Barcelona
	Samitier 7' 39' 47' 59' 74'; Sastre 36'; Arnau 83'		Barril 50'; Zabala 76'; Caramelero 78'	Stadium: Camp de les Corts; Attendance: 45.000; Referee: Melcón

29 April 1928 Quarts de final – tornada	Real Oviedo FC	2 – 2	FC Barcelona	Oviedo
	Caramelero; Barril 40'		Sastre; Arocha	Stadium: Estadio de Teatinos; Referee: Escartín Morán (Madrid)

6 May 1928 Semifinals – anada	FC Barcelona	3 – 0	CD Alavés	Barcelona
	Mas; Samitier; Ciriaco (p.p.)			Stadium: Camp de les Corts; Referee: Murguia

13 May 1928 Semifinals – tornada	CD Alavés	0 – 5	FC Barcelona	Vitòria
			Sastre; Arocha; Samitier	Stadium: Estadi de Mendizorroza; Referee: Escartín Morán (Madrid)

20 May 1928 Final	FC Barcelona	1 – 1	Real Sociedad de Fútbol	Santander
16:30	Samitier 53'		Mariscal 83'	Stadium: Campo de Sports del Sardienro; Attendance: 18.000; Referee: Vallana Jeanguenat (Biscaia)

22 May 1928 Final – desempat	FC Barcelona	1 – 1	Real Sociedad de Fútbol	Santander
11:00	Piera 63'		Kiriki 32'	Stadium: Campo de Sports del Sardienro; Attendance: 15.000; Referee: Escartín Morán (Madrid)

29 June 1928 Final – desempat	FC Barcelona	3 – 1	Real Sociedad de Fútbol	Santander
17:00	Samitier 8'; Arocha 21'; Sastre 25'		Zaldua 16'	Stadium: Campo de Sports del Sardinero; Attendance: 17.000; Referee: Sarancho
