= 1924–25 FC Barcelona season =

26th season in existence of FC Barcelona

FC Barcelona
1924–25 season
- President: Hans Gamper
- Manager: Jesza Poszony (until December); Ralph Kirby
- Campionat de Catalunya: First
- Campionat d'Espanya: Champion

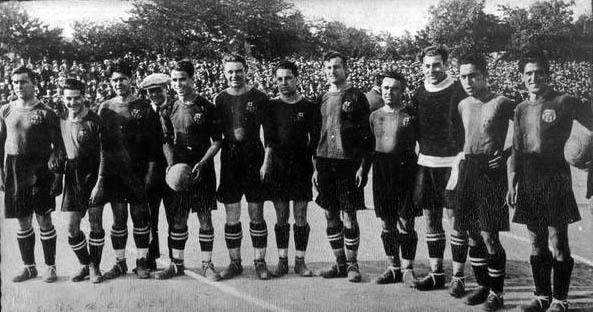

The 1924–25 season was the 26th season for FC Barcelona.

== Events ==
This year they celebrate the silver anniversary of their 25 years of history. Jesza Poszony is named new coach, the Hungarian enters with good feet and wins two Titles: the Catalunya Cup to Europe, (maximum rival in those moments), and the Glass of Spain. As a result of a match against Jupiter in homage to the Orfeo Catalá, the bureaucratic problems returned against Barça. Before the party (that did not have permission of the governing authority) the fans roared the Royal March, reason why the Captain General Milans of the Bosch closes the field of Les Corts by 6 Months and the prohibition of participating in any other act. The dictatorship forced Joan Gamper to leave for a time outside of Catalonia, Gamper promised that he would never again be a Club official. All this led irreparably to the disappearance of Barça, but the Catalans, Partners, Banca Jover (with financial aid) and the Catalan Federation (which postponed the start of the Catalunya Cto. until Barça could participate) did not succeed. In the middle of the dictatorship, the Club underwent an internal renovation that led to the presidency to Arcadi Balaguer, this got that the sanction of Les Corts was reduced to 3 months.

== Results ==
Friendly

7 September 1924	FC Barcelona	1 - 0	Poble Nou	Barcelona
	Riera			Stadium: Camp de les Corts; Referee: Peris

7 September 1924	FC Barcelona	3 - 0	SK Moravská Slavia Brno	Barcelona
	Sancho; Lopez; Sagi			Stadium: Camp de les Corts; Referee: Vela

8 September 1924	FC Barcelona	3 - 2	SK Moravská Slavia Brno	Barcelona
	Alcantara; Broad; Sagi			Stadium: Camp de les Corts; Referee: Comorera

13 September 1924	FC Barcelona	2 - 2	Real Sociedad	Barcelona
	Alcantara; Broad			Stadium: Camp de les Corts; Referee: Vilalta

14 September 1924	FC Barcelona	0 - 0	Real Sociedad	Barcelona
				Stadium: Camp de les Corts; Referee: Aramburo

21 September 1924	FC Barcelona	3 - 0	Torino	Barcelona
	Samitier; Sagi; Piera			Stadium: Camp de les Corts; Referee: Larranaga

21 September 1924	Terrassa FC	2 - 0	FC Barcelona	Barcelona
				Stadium: Terrassa; Referee: Hertzer

24 September 1924	FC Barcelona	1 - 1	Torino	Barcelona
	Sagi			Stadium: Camp de les Corts; Referee: Larranaga

28 September 1924 Copa Jose Mas I Navas	FC Barcelona	1 - 0	RCD Espanyol	Barcelona
	Samitier			Stadium: Camp de les Corts; Attendance: 30.000; Referee: Llovera

28 September 1924	CE Manresa	3 - 2	FC Barcelona	Barcelona
				Stadium: Manresa; Referee: Comorera

4 October 1924	Valencia CF	2 - 0	FC Barcelona	Valencia
				Stadium: Mestalla; Referee: Pelayo Serrano

5 October 1924	Valencia CF	1 - 2	FC Barcelona	Valencia
			Marti; Planas	Stadium: Mestalla; Referee: Pelayo Serrano

5 October 1924	FC Barcelona	1 - 0	Terrassa FC	Barcelona
	Palo			Stadium: Les Corts; Referee: Comerera

1 November 1924	FC Barcelona	0 - 0	Athletic Club	Barcelona
				Stadium: Les Corts; Referee: Llovera

2 November 1924	FC Barcelona	1 - 0	Athletic Club	Barcelona
	Hill			Stadium: Les Corts; Referee: Vilalta

7 December 1924	FC Barcelona	1 - 0	Real Unión	Barcelona
	Samitier			Stadium: Les Corts; Referee: Carcer

8 December 1924	FC Barcelona	2 - 3	Real Unión	Barcelona
	Carmelo; Bosch			Stadium: Les Corts; Referee: Carcer

21 December 1924	Gimnàstic	2 - 3	FC Barcelona	Barcelona
			Sancho; Bosch	Stadium: Tarragona; Referee: Villena

25 December 1924	FC Barcelona	3 - 0	IFK Göteborg	Barcelona
	Sagi; Palo; Shaw			Stadium: Les Corts; Referee: Villena

26 December 1924	FC Barcelona	1 - 2	IFK Göteborg	Barcelona
	Samitier			Stadium: Les Corts; Referee: Vela

28 December 1924	FC Barcelona	0 - 0	DFC Prag	Barcelona
				Stadium: Les Corts; Referee: Llovera

1 January 1925	FC Barcelona	0 - 1	DFC Prag	Barcelona
				Stadium: Les Corts; Referee: Arribas

4 January 1925	FC Barcelona	2 - 1	Boldklubben 1903	Barcelona
	Samitier			Stadium: Les Corts; Referee: Villena

6 January 1925	FC Barcelona	2 - 1	Boldklubben 1903	Barcelona
	Samitier			Stadium: Les Corts; Referee: Llovera

19 February 1925	FC Barcelona	2 - 0	Esquadra Anglesa	Barcelona
				Stadium: Les Corts

8 March 1925	FC Barcelona	1 - 0	CE Júpiter	Barcelona
	Samitier			Stadium: Les Corts

29 March 1925	Girona FC	3 - 1	FC Barcelona	Barcelona
			Arnau	Stadium: Girona; Referee: Villena

12 April 1925	FC Barcelona	2 - 2	Nacional Montevideo	Barcelona
	Samitier			Stadium: Les Corts; Referee: Girandin

13 April 1925	FC Barcelona	2 - 1	Nacional Montevideo	Barcelona
	Samitier; Sagi			Stadium: Les Corts; Referee: Girandin

13 April 1925	CF Badalona	2 - 1	FC Barcelona	Barcelona
			Martinez Sagi	Stadium: Badalona; Referee: Marine

16 May 1925	FC Barcelona	1 - 0	Birmingham City	Barcelona
	Musteros			Stadium: Les Corts; Referee: Lloveras

17 May 1925	FC Barcelona	2 - 0	Birmingham City	Barcelona
	Alcantara; Sastre			Stadium: Les Corts; Referee: Balaguer

21 May 1925	Athletic Club	3 - 0	FC Barcelona	Bilbao
				Stadium: Estadi de San Mamés; Referee: Torres

24 May 1925	Athletic Club	3 - 0	FC Barcelona	Bilbao
				Stadium: Estadi de San Mamés; Referee: Torres

31 May 1925	FC Barcelona	3 - 0	FC Gracia	Barcelona
	Sagi; Musteros; Arnau			Stadium: Les Corts; Referee: Vela

7 June 1925	FC Barcelona	2 - 1	CE Europa	Barcelona
	Sancho; Arnau			Stadium: Les Corts; Referee: Villena

11 June 1925	CE Sabadell FC	0 - 2	FC Barcelona	Barcelona
			Musteros; Alcantara	Stadium: Sabadell; Referee: Vidal

14 June 1925 Copa Compte de Lavern	FC Barcelona	3 - 0 (Note: The public whistled the Spanish national anthem. The military authorities closed the club for six months and suspended Gamper as president of the Club for the incidents, forcing him to go abroad immediately.)	CE Júpiter	Barcelona
	Sagi; Alcantara; Marti			Stadium: Les Corts; Referee: Vilalta

Campionat de Catalunya

12 October 1924 Jornada 1	FC Barcelona	1 - 1	FC Martinenc	Barcelona
	Sagi		Goal	Stadium: Camp de les Corts

19 October 1924 Jornada 2	US Sants	0 - 2	FC Barcelona	Barcelona
			Samitier; Carulla	Stadium: Camp del carrer Galileu

26 October 1924 Jornada 3	CE Europa	0 - 1	FC Barcelona	Barcelona
			Samitier	Referee: Llobera

9 November 1924 Jornada 4	Gràcia FC	1 - 1	FC Barcelona	Barcelona
	Soler		Martí	Stadium: Camp de les Corts

19 November 1924 Jornada 5	CS Sabadell	3 - 1	FC Barcelona	Sabadell
	Torralba (p.p.); Bertran; Mateu		Martí	Stadium: Camp de la Creu Alta

23 November 1924 Jornada 6	FC Barcelona	0 - 0 suspès (Note: The referee suspended the match to rest to avoid further incidents, repeating the party and later canceled it.)	RCD Español	Barcelona
				Stadium: Camp de les Corts; Referee: Serrano

30 November 1924 Jornada 7	FC Barcelona	0 - 1	Terrassa FC	Barcelona
			Gràcia 87'	Stadium: Camp de les Corts

11 January 1925 Jornada 8	FC Martinenc	0 - 3	FC Barcelona	Barcelona
			Samitier; Martí

15 January 1925 Jornada 6 (repetició)	FC Barcelona	0 - 1	RCD Español	Barcelona
15:00			Zabala	Stadium: Camp de les Corts; Attendance: porta tancada Referee: Llobera

18 January 1925 Jornada 9	FC Barcelona	2 - 1	US Sants	Barcelona
	Sagi; Samitier 39'		Goal	Stadium: Camp de les Corts

25 January 1925 Jornada 10	FC Barcelona	3 - 1	CE Europa	Barcelona
	Samitier 10' 75'; Arnau 35'		Cella	Stadium: Camp de les Corts; Referee: Vilalta

1 February 1925 Jornada 11	FC Barcelona	1 - 0	FC Gràcia	Barcelona
	Sagi			Stadium: Camp de les Corts; Referee: Arribas

8 February 1925 Jornada 12	FC Barcelona	3 - 0	CS Sabadell	Barcelona
	Arnau; Samitier; Sagi			Stadium: Camp de les Corts

16 February 1925 Jornada 13	RCD Español	0 - 1	FC Barcelona	Barcelona
			Samitier	Referee: Lloberas

25 February 1925 Jornada 14	Terrassa FC	0 - 6	FC Barcelona	Terrassa
			Piera; Arnau; Samitier

Campionat d'Espanya

1 March 1925 Jornada 1	FC Barcelona	7 - 3	Valencia CF	Barcelona
	Piera 2'; Samitier 35' 46'; Sagi		Cubells 54'; Montes	Stadium: Camp de les Corts; Referee: Steinborn

15 March 1925 Jornada 3	RSA Stadium	1 - 5	FC Barcelona	Zaragoza
	Lozano		Piera; Arnau; Sagi	Referee: Espinosa (Centro)

22 March 1925 Jornada 4	Valencia CF	1 - 1	FC Barcelona	Valencia
	Rino		Arnau	Stadium: Estadi de Mestalla

5 April 1925 Jornada 6	FC Barcelona	8 - 0	RSA Stadium	Barcelona
	Piera; Arnau; Samitier			Stadium: Camp de les Corts; Referee: Calderón (Sud)

19 April 1925 Semifinals - anada	FC Barcelona	3 - 2	Athletic Club de Madrid	Barcelona
	Samitier 30'; Sagi 62'		Palacios 31'; Tudori 58'	Stadium: Camp de les Corts; Referee: Gacituaga

26 April 1925 Semifinals - tornada	Athletic Club de Madrid	2 - 1	FC Barcelona	Madrid
	Pololo; Palacios		Sagi	Stadium: Estadio Metropolitano; Attendance: 25.000; Referee: Escurdia

3 May 1925 Semifinals - desempat	FC Barcelona	2 - 1	Athletic Club de Madrid	Zaragoza
	Arnau; Sagi		Palacios

10 May 1925 Final	FC Barcelona	2 - 0	Arenas Club de Getxo	Sevilla
16:30	Samitier 9'; Sancho 34'			Stadium: Estadio Reina Victoria; Attendance: 6.000; Referee: Balaguer (Sud)
