= 1923–24 FC Barcelona season =

25th season in existence of FC Barcelona

FC Barcelona
1923–24 season
- President: Enric Cardona
- Manager: Alf Spouncer
- Campionat de Catalunya: First
- Campionat d'Espanya: Semifinale

The 1923–24 season was the 25th season for FC Barcelona.

== Results ==
Friendly

2 September 1923	FC Barcelona	4 - 1	CS Sabadell	Barcelona
	Samitier; Sancho			Stadium: Vilassar de Mar; Referee: Vela

2 September 1923	FC Barcelona	4 - 2	CS Sabadell	Barcelona
	Vinyals; Gracia; Senyal; Marti			Stadium: Granollers; Referee: Sojo

8 September 1923	CE Júpiter	2 - 4	FC Barcelona	Barcelona
			Samitier; Marti	Stadium: Poble Nou; Referee: Aramburu

9 September 1923	FC Barcelona	6 - 0	Terrassa FC	Barcelona
	Samitier; Marti			Stadium: Les Corts; Referee: Cruella

10 September 1923	FC Barcelona	7 - 2	CE Sabadell FC	Barcelona
	Samitier; Marti; Piera; Sagi			Stadium: Sant Celoni; Referee: Llovera

11 September 1923	FC Barcelona	1 - 3	L'Avenç de l'Sport	Barcelona
	Samitier			Stadium: Olot; Referee: Palomera

15 September 1923	FC Barcelona	1 - 1	Cracovia	Barcelona
	Samitier		Chruściński	Stadium: Les Corta; Referee: Llovera

16 September 1923	FC Barcelona	7 - 1	Cracovia	Barcelona
	Sancho; Samitier; Alcantara		Kałuża	Stadium: Les Corta; Referee: Llovera

23 September 1923	FC Barcelona	4 - 2	SpVgg Greuther Fürth	Barcelona
	Samitier; Alcantara			Stadium: Les Corta; Referee: Vela

24 September 1923	FC Barcelona	7 - 2	SpVgg Greuther Fürth	Barcelona
	Samitier; Alcantara; Marti			Stadium: Les Corta; Referee: Hertzer

29 September 1923	FC Barcelona	2 - 0	Athletic Club	Barcelona
	Samitier; Alcantara			Stadium: Les Corta; Referee: Comorera

1 October 1923	FC Barcelona	5 - 1	Athletic Club	Barcelona
	Samitier; Planas			Stadium: Les Corta; Referee: Cruella

6 October 1923	FC Barcelona	0 - 0	València CF	Barcelona
				Stadium: Les Corta; Referee: Castillo

7 October 1923	FC Barcelona	5 - 2	València CF	Barcelona
	Samitier; Alcantara; Sagi			Stadium: Les Corta; Referee: Llovera

1 November 1923	FC Barcelona	3 - 0	Celta	Barcelona
	Samitier; Alcantara			Stadium: Les Corta; Referee: Comorera

4 November 1923	FC Barcelona	5 - 3	Celta	Barcelona
	Marti; Alcantara; Samitier			Stadium: Les Corta; Referee: Sampere

22 November 1923	FC Barcelona	3 - 1	RCD Espanyol	Barcelona
	Sancho; Samitier			Stadium: Les Corta; Referee: Llovera

8 December 1923	Athletic Club	5 - 2	FC Barcelona	Bilbao
			Sagi; Samitier	Stadium: Estadi de San Mamés; Referee: Saracho

9 December 1923	Athletic Club	6 - 0	FC Barcelona	Bilbao
				Stadium: Estadi de San Mamés; Referee: Serrano

16 December 1923	CE Sabadell FC	1 - 0	FC Barcelona	Barcelona
				Stadium: Sabadell; Referee: Comorera

22 December 1923	FC Barcelona	7 - 2	Vasas Budapest	Barcelona
	Samitier; Alcantara			Stadium: Les Corta; Referee: Forns

23 December 1923	FC Barcelona	0 - 2	Vasas Budapest	Barcelona
				Stadium: Les Corta; Referee: Vela

25 December 1923	FC Barcelona	1 - 0	AC Sparta Praha	Barcelona
	Marti			Stadium: Les Corta; Referee: Noel Wattson

26 December 1923	FC Barcelona	2 - 1	AC Sparta Praha	Barcelona
	Marti; Alcantara			Stadium: Les Corta; Referee: Noel Wattson

30 December 1923	FC Barcelona	1 - 0	SK Slavia Praha	Barcelona
	Marti			Stadium: Les Corta; Referee: Boas

1 January 1924	FC Barcelona	2 - 3	SK Slavia Praha	Barcelona
	Sagi; Piera			Stadium: Les Corta; Referee: Boas

5 January 1924	FC Barcelona	0 - 1	MTK Budapest FC	Barcelona
				Stadium: Les Corta; Referee: Larranaga

6 January 1924	FC Barcelona	2 - 2	MTK Budapest FC	Barcelona
	Cella I Sagi			Stadium: Les Corta; Referee: Larranaga

24 February 1924	FC Barcelona	1 - 1	CE Júpiter	Barcelona
	Rabell			Stadium: Les Corta; Referee: Forns

2 March 1924	Real Sociedad	1 - 1	FC Barcelona	Sant Sebastià
			Marti	Stadium: Estadi d'Atotxa; Referee: Ezkurdia

4 March 1924	Real Sociedad	2 - 1	FC Barcelona	Sant Sebastià
			Polo	Stadium: Estadi d'Atotxa; Referee: Bontegui

9 March 1924	FC Barcelona	6 - 1	Terrassa FC	Barcelona
	Alcantara; Gracia; Vinyals			Stadium: Les Corts; Referee: Comorera

16 March 1924	FC Barcelona	6 - 0	Club Natacion d'Alacant	Barcelona
	Marti; Gracia; Alcantara			Stadium: Les Corts; Referee: Torrens

19 March 1924	FC Barcelona	4 - 0	Club Natacion d'Alacant	Barcelona
	Marti; Samitier; Alcantara			Stadium: Les Corts; Referee: Lemmel

25 March 1924	FC Barcelona	4 - 1	FC Gràcia	Barcelona
	Gracia; Vinyals; Palo			Stadium: Les Corts; Referee: Lopez

30 March 1924	FC Barcelona	1 - 1	CE Manresa	Barcelona
	Palo			Stadium: Les Corts; Referee: Prada

6 April 1924	FC Vilafranca	2 - 2	FC Barcelona	Barcelona
			?	Stadium: Vilafranca; Referee: Vives

6 April 1924	CE Manresa	sense dades	FC Barcelona	Catalunya
				Stadium: Manresa

10 April 1924	Bisbalenca F.C.	1 - 1	FC Barcelona	Barcelona
			?	Stadium: La Bisbal d'Empordà; Referee: ?

27 April 1924	Sentmenat	sense dades	FC Barcelona	Barcelona
				Stadium: Sentmenat

4 May 1924	FC Barcelona	1 - 0	FC Gràcia	Barcelona
	Gracia			Stadium: Camp de les Corts; Referee: Aramburu

11 May 1924	FC Barcelona	1 - 2	Everton FC	Barcelona
	Peidró			Stadium: Camp de les Corts; Referee: Montero

18 May 1924	FC Barcelona	2 - 1	Everton FC	Barcelona
	Alcantara; Piera			Stadium: Camp de les Corts; Referee: Contreras

24 May 1924	FC Barcelona	0 - 2	Newcastle United	Barcelona
				Stadium: Camp de les Corts; Referee: Comorera

25 May 1924	FC Barcelona	0 - 1	Newcastle United	Barcelona
				Stadium: Camp de les Corts; Referee: Vela

1 June 1924	FC Barcelona	0 - 2	Dundee	Barcelona
				Stadium: Camp de les Corts; Referee: Villena

5 June 1924	FC Barcelona	1 - 2	Dundee	Barcelona
	Piera			Stadium: Camp de les Corts; Referee: Comorera

8 June 1924	FC Barcelona	3 - 2	Sevilla FC	Barcelona
	Sagi; Peidró			Stadium: Camp de les Corts; Referee: Marine

9 June 1924	FC Barcelona	4 - 0	Sevilla FC	Barcelona
	Vinyals; Gracia; Piera; Carulla			Stadium: Camp de les Corts; Referee: Vilalta

15 June 1924	Girona FC	3 - 0	FC Barcelona	Barcelona
				Stadium: Cassa

Copa Pilar Alonso

13 April 1924	FC Barcelona	3 - 0	FC Atlètic de Sabadell	Barcelona
	Sola; Palo; Bosch			Stadium: Camp de les Corts; Referee: Marine

Copa Palau de la Moda

29 May 1924	FC Barcelona	1 - 2	CE Sabadell FC	Barcelona
	Alcantara			Stadium: Camp de les Corts; Referee: Rosell

15 June 1924	CE Sabadell FC	3 - 5	FC Barcelona	Barcelona
			Alcantara; Bosch; Piera; Sagi	Stadium: Sabadell; Referee: Aramburu

29 June 1924 desempat	FC Barcelona	1 - 0	CE Sabadell FC	Barcelona
	Alcantara			Stadium: Camp de les Corts; Referee: Castillo

Campionat de Catalunya

21 October 1923 Jornada 2	FC Barcelona	2 - 1	CS Sabadell	Barcelona
	Samitier; Sancho		Grau	Stadium: Camp de les Corts; Referee: Mariné

28 October 1923 Jornada 3	FC Barcelona	2 - 0	RCD Español	Barcelona
	Montesinos (p.p.); Samitier			Stadium: Camp de les Corts; Referee: Cruella

11 November 1923 Jornada 4	US Sants	1 - 2	FC Barcelona	Barcelona
	Feliu		Samitier; Sagi	Stadium: Camp de les Corts; Referee: Castillo

18 November 1923 Jornada 5	FC Martinenc	0 - 9	FC Barcelona	Barcelona
			Alcántara; Sagi; Samitier; Sancho	Stadium: Camp de les Corts; Referee: Cruella

2 December 1923 Jornada 6	CE Europa	4 - 5	FC Barcelona	Barcelona
	Julià; Cros; Pelao		Samitier; Martí	Stadium: Camp de les Corts; Referee: Cruella

13 January 1924 Jornada 8	RCD Español	0 - 1	FC Barcelona	Barcelona
			Piera	Stadium: Camp de les Corts; Referee: Milego

20 January 1924 Jornada 9	FC Barcelona	2 - 1	US Sants	Barcelona
	Samitier		Calvet	Stadium: Camp de les Corts; Referee: Contreras

2 February 1924 Jornada 10	FC Barcelona	3 - 0	FC Martinenc	Barcelona
	Samitier; Martí			Stadium: Camp de les Corts; Referee: Vilalta

10 February 1924 Jornada 1	FC Barcelona	1 - 0	CE Europa	Barcelona
	Martí			Stadium: Camp de les Corts; Referee: Milego

17 February 1924 Jornada 7	CS Sabadell	0 - 1	FC Barcelona	Sabadell
			Samitier	Stadium: Camp de la Creu Alta; Referee: Vidal

Campionat d'Espanya

23 March 1924 Ronda prèvia - anada	FC Barcelona	8 - 1	RSA Stadium	Barcelona
	Sagi; Alcántara; Samitier		Buylla	Stadium: Camp de les Corts; Referee: Carcer

30 March 1924 Ronda prèvia - tornada	RSA Stadium	0 - 9	FC Barcelona	Zaragoza
			Gràcia; Samitier; Sagi; Alcántara	Referee: Sánchez

6 April 1924 Quarts de final - anada	FC Barcelona	2 - 0	Real Sporting de Gijón	Barcelona
	Alcántara; Carulla			Stadium: Camp de les Corts; Referee: Balaguer

6 April 1924 Quarts de final - tornada	Real Sporting de Gijón	2 - 0	FC Barcelona	Gijón
	Arcadio 86'			Stadium: Estadi El Molinón; Referee: Contreras (Centro)

20 April 1924 Quarts de final - desempat	FC Barcelona	3 - 1	Real Sporting de Gijón	Madrid
	Piera; Gràcia		Arcadio	Stadium: Estadio Metropolitano; Referee: Colina

20 April 1924 Semifinals - anada	Real Unión Club	1 - 0	FC Barcelona	Irun
	Vázquez 17'			Stadium: Campo de Amute; Referee: Sánchez

27 April 1924 Semifinals - tornada	FC Barcelona	2 - 0	Real Unión Club	Barcelona
	Piera; Alcántara			Stadium: Camp de les Corts; Referee: Andrados

30 April 1924 Semifinals - desempat	Real Unión Club	6 - 1	FC Barcelona	Sant Sebastià
	Vázquez 21' 37'; Errazquin 28' 46'; Petit 65'; Matías 86'		Martí 60'	Stadium: Estadi d'Atotxa; Referee: Sánchez
