= 1919–20 FC Barcelona season =

21st season of FC Barcelona

FC Barcelona
1919–20 season
- President: Ricard Graells
- Manager: Jack Greenwell
- Campionat de Catalunya: Winners
- Copa del Rey: Winners

The 1919–20 season was the 21st season for FC Barcelona. During the season, the club won the regional Campionat de Catalunya and the national Campionat d'Espanya.

== Results ==
=== Friendlies ===
17 August 1919	CF Badalona	2–3	FC Barcelona	Barcelona
			Lakatos; Alcántara	Stadium: Badalona; Referee: Torrens

24 August 1919	FC Internacional	0–0	FC Barcelona	Barcelona
				Stadium: Internacional; Referee: Peris

31 August 1919	FC Barcelona	6–0	Racing Club de Madrid	Barcelona
	Sesúmaga; Martínez; Alcántara; Plaza			Stadium: Vilafranca; Referee: Torrens

7 September 1919	Unió Esportiva Sant Andreu	1–0	FC Barcelona	Barcelona
				Stadium: Avenc; Referee: Baonza

8 September 1919	FC Barcelona	3–0	CE Júpiter	Barcelona
	Sesúmaga; Alcántara			Stadium: Industria; Referee: Baonza

14 September 1919	CE Europa	1–2	FC Barcelona	Barcelona
			Martínez; Alcántara	Stadium: Europa; Referee: Peris

21 September 1919	FC Barcelona	2–0	CE Europa	Barcelona
	Martínez; Sancho			Stadium: Industria; Referee: Palomera

22 September 1919	Unió Esportiva Sant Andreu	2–0	FC Barcelona	Barcelona
				Stadium: Avenc; Referee: Timor

24 September 1919	FC Barcelona	1–0	FC Martinenc	Barcelona
	Martínez			Stadium: Industria; Referee: Blanch

28 September 1919	FC Barcelona	3–0	Unió Esportiva Sant Andreu	Barcelona
	Sesúmaga; Martínez; Alcántara			Stadium: Industria; Referee: Brias

19 October 1919	FC Barcelona	2–2	FC Espanya	Barcelona
	Garchitorena; Alcántara			Stadium: Industria; Referee: Torrens

2 November 1919	FC Barcelona	6–0	CF Badalona	Barcelona
	Martínez; Alcántara; Vinyals			Stadium: Industria; Referee: Marine

7 December 1919	FC Barcelona	1–0	FC La Chaux-de-Fonds	Barcelona
	Alcántara			Stadium: Industria; Referee: Torras

8 December 1919	FC Barcelona	4–2	FC La Chaux-de-Fonds	Barcelona
	Alcántara; Julià			Stadium: Industria; Referee: Lemel

25 December 1919	Sporting de Gijón	1–0	FC Barcelona	Gijón
				Stadium: El Molinón; Referee: Sanchez

26 December 1919	Sporting de Gijón	3–2	FC Barcelona	Gijón
			Alcántara	Stadium: El Molinón; Referee: Fernandez

28 December 1919	Sporting de Gijón	0–2	FC Barcelona	Gijón
			Alcántara; Martínez	Stadium: El Molinón; Referee: Fernandez

1 January 1920	FC Barcelona	3–0	Real Oviedo	Barcelona
	Alcántara; Julià; Samitier			Stadium: Industria; Referee: Lemel

4 January 1920	FC Barcelona	5–1	Real Oviedo	Barcelona
	Alcántara; Martínez; Sesúmaga			Stadium: Industria; Referee: Sampere

6 January 1920	FC Barcelona	1–2	Real Oviedo	Barcelona
	A. Berger			Stadium: Industria; Referee: Lemel

15 February 1920	FC Barcelona	2–2	FC Madrid	Barcelona
	Alcántara; Vinyals			Stadium: Industria; Referee: Lemel

18 February 1920	FC Barcelona	7–1	FC Madrid	Barcelona
	Alcántara; Vinyals; Sancho; Plaza; Lakatos			Stadium: Industria; Referee: Peris

22 February 1920	La Colònia Güell	0–7	FC Barcelona	Barcelona
			Sancho; Plaza; Lakatos; Martínez	Stadium: Colònia Güell; Referee: Baonza

28 February 1920	FC Martinenc	0–0	FC Barcelona	Barcelona
				Stadium: Martinenc; Referee: Lemel

16 March 1920	FC Barcelona	3–2	SK Slavia Praha	Barcelona
	Alcántara; Martínez; Sancho			Stadium: Industria; Referee: Torrens

19 March 1920	FC Barcelona	0–0	SK Slavia Praha	Barcelona
				Stadium: Industria; Referee: Peris

21 March 1920	FC Barcelona	6–0	SK Slavia Praha	Barcelona
	Alcántara; Sesúmaga; Martínez; Vinyals			Stadium: Industria; Referee: Marine

5 April 1920	FC Barcelona	2–1	UE Sants	Barcelona
	A. Berger			Stadium: Industria; Referee: Vela

20 April 1920	Atlético de Madrid	2–2 (Note: Barcelona played this friendly match while in Madrid waiting for the Copa del Rey semi-final against Sevilla. The cup tie was ultimately forfeited by Sevilla.)	FC Barcelona	Madrid
			Martínez; Costa	Stadium: Atlético; Referee: Montero

24 April 1920	FC Barcelona	4–1	CE Europa	Barcelona
	Martínez; Alcántara; Julià			Stadium: Industria; Referee: Marine

13 May 1920	FC Barcelona	4–2	Unió Esportiva Sant Andreu	Barcelona
	Martínez; Alcántara			Stadium: Industria; Referee: Marine

16 May 1920	CE Júpiter	0–3	FC Barcelona	Barcelona
			Julià; A. Berger	Stadium: Poble Nou; Referee: Baonza

23 May 1920	FC Barcelona	2–1	Daring Club de Bruxelles	Barcelona
	Martínez; Julià			Stadium: Industria; Referee: Marine

24 May 1920	FC Barcelona	1–1	Daring Club de Bruxelles	Barcelona
	Vinyals			Stadium: Industria; Referee: Lemel

30 May 1920	FC Barcelona	1–0	Red Star FC	Barcelona
	Samitier			Stadium: Industria; Referee: Chayrigues

3 June 1920	FC Barcelona	4–0	Red Star FC	Barcelona
	Sancho; Julià; Vinyals			Stadium: Industria; Referee: Peris

13 June 1920	Terrassa FC	2–1	FC Barcelona	Barcelona
			Julià	Stadium: Terrassa; Referee: Timor

20 June 1920	FC Barcelona	0–0	CE Sabadell FC	Barcelona
				Stadium: Industria; Referee: Baro

4 July 1920	FC Barcelona	1–0	FC Martinenc	Barcelona
	Sancho			Stadium: Industria; Referee: Sampere

10 July 1920	FC Barcelona	1–1	FC Espanya	Barcelona
				Stadium: Industria

=== Campionat de Catalunya ===
26 October 1919 Round 1	FC Internacional	1–6	FC Barcelona	Barcelona
15:10	Goal		Alcántara; Torralba; Martínez; Sancho	Stadium: Camp del carrer Galileu; Referee: Lemmel

9 November 1919 Round 2	CS Sabadell	2–4	FC Barcelona	Sabadell
	Goal		Alcántara; Martínez; Sancho	Stadium: Camp de la Creu Alta; Referee: Palomera

16 November 1919 Round 3	FC Barcelona	2–0	RCD Español	Barcelona
	Alcántara; Lakatos			Stadium: Camp del carrer Indústria; Referee: Brias

23 November 1919 Round 4	FC Barcelona	1–0	FC Espanya	Barcelona
	Alcántara			Stadium: Camp del carrer Indústria; Referee: Sanpere

30 November 1919 Round 5	CE Europa	0–1	FC Barcelona	Barcelona
			Sancho	Referee: Torrens

14 December 1919 Round 6	FC Barcelona	2–1	FC Internacional	Barcelona
	Alcántara; Zamora		Goal	Stadium: Camp del carrer Indústria; Referee: Timor

11 January 1920 Round 7	FC Barcelona	4–0	CS Sabadell	Barcelona
	Alcántara			Stadium: Camp del carrer Indústria; Referee: Torrens

18 January 1920 Round 8	RCD Español	0–1	FC Barcelona	Barcelona
			Vinyals	Referee: Llobera

25 January 1920 Round 9	FC Espanya	0–4	FC Barcelona	Barcelona
			Alcántara; Sesúmaga	Referee: Sanpere

8 February 1920 Round 10	FC Barcelona	3–3	CE Europa	Barcelona
	Vinyals; Torralba		Alcázar; Nogués	Referee: Quirante Pineda

=== Copa del Rey ===
28 March 1920 Quarter-finals	Real Unión Club	0–1	FC Barcelona	Irun
			Alcántara	Stadium: Estadio de Amute; Referee: Larrañaga

4 April 1920 Quarter-finals	FC Barcelona	4–4	Real Unión Club	Barcelona
	Vinyals; Sesúmaga; Alcántara		Amantegui; R. Petit; Echeveste; Emery	Stadium: Camp del carrer Indústria; Referee: Larrañaga

18 April 1920 Semi-finals	FC Barcelona	w/o (Note: The semi-final was scheduled to be played on 18 and 19 April. Sevilla did not appear for the match, claiming they were celebrating the Feria de Abril. The Royal Spanish Football Federation subsequently awarded the tie to Barcelona, advancing them to the final.)	Sevilla FC	Madrid

2 May 1920 Final	FC Barcelona	2–0	Athletic Club	Gijón
17:30	Martínez 70'; Alcántara 80'			Stadium: Estadi El Molinón; Attendance: 10,000; Referee: Bertran de Lis
