= 1922–23 FC Barcelona season =

24th season in existence of FC Barcelona

FC Barcelona
1922–23 season
- President: Hans Gamper
- Manager: Jack Greenwell
- Campionat de Catalunya: Second

The 1922–23 season was the 24th season for FC Barcelona.

== Events ==
Joan Gamper left the presidency on 29 June 1923. A few months later, Enric Cardona took over. The premiere of the team's first anthem was seen during this season.

== Results ==
Friendly

10 September 1922	CE Júpiter	0 - 6	FC Barcelona	Barcelona
			Samitier; Alcantara; Gracia; Piera; Vinyals	Stadium: Jupitre; Referee: Vidal

16 September 1922	FC Barcelona	5 - 0	Pro Vercelli	Barcelona
	Alcantara; Gracia; Samitier			Stadium: Les Corts; Referee: Peris

17 September 1922	FC Barcelona	3 - 1	Pro Vercelli	Barcelona
	Alcantara; Gracia; Sagi			Stadium: Les Corts; Referee: Cruella

23 September 1922	FC Barcelona	2 - 1	SpVgg Greuther Fürth	Barcelona
	equip contrari Sagi			Stadium: Les Corts; Referee: Comorera

24 September 1922	FC Barcelona	0 - 0	SpVgg Greuther Fürth	Barcelona
				Stadium: Les Corts; Referee: Marine

30 September 1922	Racing Club de Madrid	2 - 5	FC Barcelona	Madrid
			Gracia; Cella II	Stadium: Racing; Referee: Ruete

1 October 1922	Racing Club de Madrid	1 - 7	FC Barcelona	Madrid
			Piera; Mallorqui; Gracia; Cella II	Stadium: Racing; Referee: Ruete

17 October 1922	FC Barcelona	5 - 2	FC Madrid	Zaragoza
	Samitier; Alcantara; Gracia; Torralba			Referee: Marine

18 October 1922	FC Barcelona	4 - 2	FC Madrid	Zaragoza
	Martinez; Alcantara; Gracia			Referee: Marine

1 November 1922	FC Barcelona	1 - 1	FC Martinenc	Barcelona
	Alcantara			Stadium: Les Corts; Referee: Cruella

8 December 1922	Athletic Club	3 - 2	FC Barcelona	Bilbao
			Gracia	Stadium: San Mames; Referee: Vallana

10 December 1922	Athletic Club	4 - 1	FC Barcelona	Bilbao
			Sagi	Stadium: San Mames; Referee: Vallana

15 December 1922	FC Barcelona	1 - 1	UE Sants	Barcelona
	Cella II			Stadium: Industria; Referee: Torrens

24 December 1922	FC Barcelona	0 - 0	MTK Budapest FC	Barcelona
				Stadium: Les Corts; Referee: Boas (Holanda)

26 December 1922	FC Barcelona	0 - 0	MTK Budapest FC	Barcelona
				Stadium: Les Corts; Referee: Boas (Holanda)

31 December 1922	FC Barcelona	1 - 3	Amateure	Barcelona
	Alcantara			Stadium: Les Corts; Referee: Bauwens

1 January 1923	FC Barcelona	4 - 0	Amateure	Barcelona
	Gracia; Sagi; Martinez			Stadium: Les Corts; Referee: Bauwens (primera part) i Ponzony (segona part)

6 January 1923	FC Barcelona	2 - 1	1. FC Nürnberg	Barcelona
	Alcantara; Sagi			Stadium: Les Corts; Referee: Retschuri (Austria)

7 January 1923	FC Barcelona	4 - 2	1. FC Nürnberg	Barcelona
	Alcantara; Martinez; Gracia			Stadium: Les Corts; Referee: Retschuri (Austria)

22 January 1923	FC Barcelona	1 - 2	CE Sabadell FC	Barcelona
	Gracia			Stadium: Mollet; Referee: Lopez

28 January 1923	Unió Esportiva Sant Andreu	0 - 1	FC Barcelona	Barcelona
			Martinez	Stadium: Avenc

2 February 1923	FC Barcelona	0 - 4	Rapid Wien	Barcelona
				Stadium: Les Corts; Referee: Marine

4 February 1923	FC Barcelona	4 - 3	Rapid Wien	Barcelona
	Vinyals; Planas; Martinez; Sagi			Stadium: Les Corts; Referee: Peris

10 February 1923	FC Barcelona	2 - 0	Servette FC	Barcelona
	Alcantara; Gracia			Stadium: Les Corts; Referee: Peris

11 February 1923	FC Barcelona	4 - 2	Servette FC	Barcelona
	Alcantara; Gracia; Vinyals; Samitier			Stadium: Les Corts; Referee: Marine

25 February 1923	FC Barcelona	2 - 1	Select Catalonia	Barcelona
	Gracia			Stadium: Les Corts; Referee: Forns

3 March 1923	FC Barcelona	2 - 0	Ferencváros	Barcelona
	Alcantara; Piera			Stadium: Les Corts; Referee: Comorera

4 March 1923	FC Barcelona	2 - 0	Ferencváros	Barcelona
	Gracia; Martinez			Stadium: Les Corts; Referee: Vela

1 April 1923	FC Barcelona	1 - 1	Real Unión Club	Barcelona
	Gracia			Stadium: Les Corts; Referee: Marine

2 April 1923	FC Barcelona	3 - 2	Real Unión Club	Barcelona
	Sagi; Piera			Stadium: Les Corts; Referee: Vidal

7 April 1923	FC Barcelona	3 - 0	1. HŠK Građanski Zagreb	Barcelona
	Homs; Gracia; Cella II			Stadium: Les Corts; Referee: Marine

9 April 1923	FC Barcelona	0 - 1	1. HŠK Građanski Zagreb	Barcelona
				Stadium: Les Corts; Referee: Marine

15 April 1923	Unió Esportiva Sant Andreu	0 - 0	FC Barcelona	Barcelona
				Stadium: Avenc; Referee: Castillo

5 May 1923	FC Barcelona	4 - 1	Makkabi Brun	Barcelona
	Martinez; Gracia; Cella I Samitier			Stadium: Les Corts; Referee: Vela

6 May 1923	FC Barcelona	2 - 0	Makkabi Brun	Barcelona
	Sagi; Gracia			Stadium: Les Corts; Referee: Comorera

10 May 1923	FC Barcelona	4 - 0	Racing Bruselles	Barcelona
	Alcantara; Marti			Stadium: Les Corts; Referee: Marti

12 May 1923	FC Barcelona	3 - 3	Racing Bruselles	Barcelona
	Gracia; Sagi			Stadium: Les Corts; Referee: Peris

20 May 1923	FC Barcelona	2 - 1	Ilford F.C.	Barcelona
	Gracia			Stadium: Les Corts; Referee: Vela

21 May 1923	FC Barcelona	2 - 2	Ilford F.C.	Barcelona
	Gracia			Stadium: Les Corts; Referee: Marine

26 May 1923	FC Barcelona	3 - 0	Bishop Auckland F.C.	Barcelona
	Gracia; Marti			Stadium: Les Corts; Referee: Vela

27 May 1923	FC Barcelona	5 - 0	Bishop Auckland F.C.	Barcelona
	Sagi; Marti; Lakatos			Stadium: Les Corts; Referee: Cruella

31 May 1923	FC Barcelona	2 - 0	Dundee F.C.	Barcelona
	Alcantara; Marti			Stadium: Les Corts; Referee: Vela

3 June 1923	FC Barcelona	3 - 1	Dundee F.C.	Barcelona
	Alcantara; Sagi			Stadium: Les Corts; Referee: Vela

9 June 1923	FC Barcelona	1 - 3	Daring Bruselles	Barcelona
	Gracia			Stadium: Les Corts; Referee: Comorera

10 June 1923	FC Barcelona	2 - 0	Daring Bruselles	Barcelona
	Gracia; Alcantara			Stadium: Les Corts; Referee: Peris

17 June 1923	FC Barcelona	2 - 1	CE Sabadell FC	Barcelona
	Gracia; Alcantara			Stadium: Les Corts; Referee: Baonza

22 June 1923	FC Barcelona	4 - 3	Olympique de Paris	Barcelona
	Gracia; Alcantara; Coma; Sagi			Stadium: Les Corts; Referee: Vela

24 June 1923	CE Sabadell FC	1 - 3	FC Barcelona	Barcelona
			Gracia; Marti	Stadium: Sabadell; Referee: Hartzer

24 June 1923	FC Barcelona	2 - 1	FC Gràcia	Barcelona
	Piera; Villar			Stadium: El Vendrell; Referee: Popez

29 June 1923	Unió Esportiva Sant Andreu	0 - 1	FC Barcelona	Barcelona
			Piera	Stadium: Avenc; Referee: Aramburu

29 June 1923	FC Barcelona	5 - 0	Iluro SC	Barcelona
	Alcantara; Gràcia; Blanco			Stadium: Villasar de Mar; Referee: Vidal

1 July 1923	FC Barcelona	10 - 0	CE Júpiter	Barcelona
	Samitier; Marti; Pascual; Vinyals			Stadium: El Masnou; Referee: Sampere

2 June 1923	Terrassa FC	3 - 3	FC Barcelona	Barcelona
			Samitier	Stadium: Terrassa

8 July 1923	FC Barcelona	4 - 3	CE Sabadell FC	Barcelona
	Samitier; Serra			Stadium: Premià de Mar; Referee: Vidal

8 July 1923	FC Barcelona	1 - 3	Atlètic de Sabadell	Barcelona
	Pueyo			Stadium: Arenys; Referee: Comorera

8 July 1923	FC Barcelona	0 - 1	L'Avenç de l'Sport	Barcelona
				Stadium: Vic; Referee: Ferrer

13 July 1923	Alfonso XIII FBC	0 - 14	FC Barcelona	Palma
			Gracia; Sancho; Samitier; Marti; Piera	Stadium: Palma de Mallorca; Referee: Forns

13 July 1923	Alfonso XIII FBC	0 - 3	FC Barcelona	Palma
			Gracia; Samitier	Stadium: Palma de Mallorca; Referee: Forns

21 July 1923	FC Palafrugell	2 - 7	FC Barcelona	Barcelona
			Gracia; Vinyals; Cella I Senyal	Stadium: Palafrugell; Referee: Baonza

22 July 1923	FC Barcelona	3 - 1	L'Avenç de l'Sport	Barcelona
	Gracia; Vinyals; Cella I			Stadium: Palafrugell; Referee: Rius

29 July 1923	FC Barcelona	2 - 3	FC Martinenc	Barcelona
	Sancho; Alcantara			Stadium: Industria; Referee: Cruella

4 August 1923	FC Barcelona	5 - 1	FC Martinenc	Barcelona
	Marti; Pueyo; Aparici I			Stadium: Sant Feliu de Guíxols; Referee: Cabanyes

5 August 1923	FC Barcelona	6 - 1	FC Martinenc	Barcelona
	Marti; Pueyo; Masso			Stadium: Sant Feliu de Guíxols; Referee: Bofill

26 August 1923	FC Barcelona	1 - 5	FC Martinenc	Barcelona
	?			Stadium: Els Brucs; Referee: Arman

Campionat de Catalunya

8 October 1922 Jornada 1	CS Sabadell FC	2 - 0	FC Barcelona	Sabadell
	Molins; Tena			Stadium: Camp de la Creu Alta; Referee: Planell

22 October 1922 Jornada 3	FC Barcelona	4 - 1	Avenç de l'Sport	Barcelona
	Alcántara; Gràcia		Sala	Stadium: Camp de les Corts; Referee: Sanpere

5 November 1922 Jornada 4	FC Barcelona	2 - 0	CE Europa	Barcelona
	Piera; Alcántara			Stadium: Camp de les Corts; Referee: Montero

12 November 1922 Jornada 5	FC Barcelona	1 - 0	RCD Español	Barcelona
	Sagi			Stadium: Camp de les Corts; Attendance: 25.000; Referee: Llobera

26 November 1922 Jornada 2	US Sants	1 - 3	FC Barcelona	Barcelona
14:50	Sancho		Gràcia; Piera	Stadium: Camp del carrer Galileu; Referee: Larranaga

3 December 1922 Jornada 6	FC Barcelona	3 - 1	CS Sabadell FC	Barcelona
	Gràcia		Molins	Stadium: Camp de les Corts; Attendance: 25.000; Referee: Mariné

11 March 1923 Jornada 7	FC Barcelona	4 - 1	US Sants	Barcelona
	Martínez; Piera		Oliveras	Stadium: Camp de les Corts; Referee: Montero

15 March 1923 Jornada 9	CE Europa	2 - 2	FC Barcelona	Barcelona
15:25	Cros 14'; Julià		Piera 18'; Sagi	Stadium: Camp del carrer Indústria; Attendance: 12.000; Referee: Contreras

18 March 1923 Jornada 10	RCD Español	1 - 5	FC Barcelona	Barcelona
	Goal		Martínez; Alcántara; Gràcia 84'	Stadium: Estadi de Sarrià; Attendance: 12.000; Referee: Carcer

Jornada 8	Avenç de l'Sport	not play	FC Barcelona	Barcelona

21 March 1923 Desempat	CE Europa	1 - 0	FC Barcelona	Girona
15:00	Alcázar			Stadium: Camp de Vista Alegre; Attendance: 5.000; Referee: Llobera
