= Joan Coma =

Joan Coma (1877–1959) was president of FC Barcelona from 1931 to 1934.

He took over the presidency of Futbol Club Barcelona from on 20 December 1931 following Antoni Olivers resignation. His presidency coincided with the formation of the Republic of Spain, and the following turbulence in the society made it hard to attract the public to football matches, resulting in a loss in income. The financial pressure led Coma to release Josep Samitier, who later signed for arch-rival Real Madrid.

On 16 July 1934, Coma resigned the presidency after three trophyless years in charge.
