= 1918–19 FC Barcelona season =

20th season in existence of FC Barcelona

FC Barcelona
1918–19 season
- President: Hans Gamper
- Manager: Jack Greenwell
- Campionat de Catalunya: First
- Campionat d'Espanya: Vice-champion

The 1918–19 season was the 20th season for FC Barcelona.

== Results ==
Friendly

| 25 August 1918 | FC Internacional | 2 - 2 | FC Barcelona | Barcelona |
| | | | Martínez | Stadium: Internacional; Referee: Peris |

| 15 September 1918 | CE Sabadell FC | 1 - 2 | FC Barcelona | Barcelona |
| | | | Martínez; Lakatos | Stadium: Sabadell; Referee: Perez |

| 15 September 1918 | FC Barcelona | 1 - 1 | Unió Esportiva Sant Andreu | Barcelona |
| | | | ? | Stadium: Industria; Referee: ? |

| 22 September 1918 | FC Barcelona | 8 - 2 | Racing Club de Madrid | Barcelona |
| | Sagi; Martinez; Lakatos; Verges | | | Stadium: Industria; Referee: Torras |

| 24 September 1918 | FC Barcelona | 2 - 0 | Racing Club de Madrid | Barcelona |
| | Lakatos; Albadalejo | | | Stadium: Industria; Referee: Marti |

| 29 September 1918 | FC Barcelona | 1 - 1 | FC Espanya | Barcelona |
| | Sagi | | | Stadium: Industria; Referee: Peris |

| 13 October 1918 | FC Barcelona | 2 - 1 | CE Europa | Barcelona |
| | Alcantara; Martinez | | | Stadium: Industria; Referee: Marti |

| 1 November 1918 | FC Barcelona | 6 - 4 | FC Martinenc | Barcelona |
| | Martinez; Alcantara; Lakatos | | | Stadium: Industria; Referee: Marti |

| 3 November 1918 | FC Barcelona | 5 - 1 | CF Badalona | Barcelona |
| | Martinez; Alcantara; Torralba | | | Stadium: Industria; Referee: Traiter |

| 15 December 1918 | FC Barcelona | 3 - 0 | CE Europa | Barcelona |
| | Alcantara; Lakatos | | | Stadium: Industria; Referee: Torras |

| 29 December 1918 | FC Barcelona | 4 - 1 | CE Sabadell FC | Barcelona |
| | Alcantara; Lakatos; Sagi | | | Stadium: Industria; Referee: Torras |

| 1 January 1919 | FC Barcelona | 5 - 3 | Unió Esportiva Sant Andreu | Barcelona |
| | Alcantara; Martinez | | | Stadium: Industria; Referee: Baonza |

| 5 January 1919 | FC Barcelona | 3 - 0 | Real Unión Club de Irun | Barcelona |
| | Lakatos; Vinyals; Alcantara | | | Stadium: Industria; Referee: Marti |

| 6 January 1919 | FC Barcelona | 7 - 2 | Real Unión Club de Irun | Barcelona |
| | Vinyals; Alcantara; Sagi; Lakatos; Martinez | | | Stadium: Industria; Referee: Torras |

| 16 February 1919 | CF Badalona | 2 - 3 | FC Barcelona | Barcelona |
| | | | Martinez; Alcantara | Stadium: Badalona; Referee: Traite |

| 23 February 1919 | CE Júpiter | 4 - 6 | FC Barcelona | Barcelona |
| | | | Martinez; Alcantara; Lakatos | Stadium: Poble Nou; Referee: Baonza |

| 16 March 1919 | FC Barcelona | 4 - 1 | UE Sants | Barcelona |
| | Alcantara; Lakatos; Martinez | | | Stadium: Industria; Referee: Marti |

| 6 April 1919 | FC Barcelona | 1 - 2 | FC Internacional | Barcelona |
| | Sancho | | | Stadium: Industria |

| 11 May 1919 | FC Barcelona | 1 - 0 | CF Badalona | Barcelona |
| | Alcantara | | | Stadium: Industria; Referee: Naudon |

| 25 May 1919 | FC Barcelona | 1 - 0 | Select Catalonia | Barcelona |
| | Lakatos | | | Stadium: Industria; Referee: Torras |

| 29 May 1919 | FC Barcelona | 2 - 0 | Aliats | Barcelona |
| | Lakatos | | | Stadium: Industria; Referee: Peris |

| 31 May 1919 | FC Barcelona | 2 - 0 | Aliats | Barcelona |
| | Samitier; Sesumaga | | | Stadium: Industria; Referee: Oltra Marti |

| 1 June 1919 | FC Barcelona | 6 - 0 | Aliats | Barcelona |
| | Sesumaga; Martinez; Gracia; Vinyals | | | Stadium: Industria; Referee: Peris |

| 8 June 1919 | FC Barcelona | 5 - 2 | Regiment Alcantara | Barcelona |
| | Gracia; Lakatos; Loredo | | | Stadium: Industria; Referee: Femenia |

| ? June 1919 | FC Barcelona | 1 - 0 | FC Internacional | Barcelona |
| | Lakatos | | | Stadium: Industria; Referee: Peris |

| 22 June 1919 | FC Barcelona | 6 - 1 | UE Sants | Barcelona |
| | Martinez; Gracia; Lakatos; Alcantara; Vinyals | | | Stadium: Industria; Referee: Torres Ullastres primera part i Vela segona part |

| 29 June 1919 | FC Barcelona | 3 - 0 | FC Espanya | Barcelona |
| | Martinez; Sesumaga | | | Stadium: Industria; Referee: Torres |

| 6 July 1919 | FC Barcelona | 7 - 2 | Unió Esportiva Sant Andreu | Barcelona |
| | | | | Stadium: Industria; Referee: Marine |

| 13 July 1919 | Unió Esportiva Sant Andreu | 2 - 3 | FC Barcelona | Barcelona |
| | | | Sesumaga; Vinyals | Stadium: Andreuenc; Referee: Baonza |

| ? July 1919 | FC Vilafranca | 1 - 3 | FC Barcelona | Barcelona |
| | | | Alcaniz; Loredo; Tejeiro | Stadium: Vilafranca; Referee: Greenwell |

| ? July 1919 | Reus Deportiu | 2 - 3 | FC Barcelona | Barcelona |
| | | | Zamora; Loredo; Alcantara | Stadium: Reus; Referee: Pellicer |

| 27 July 1919 | FC Barcelona | 4 - 1 | Atlètic de Sabadell | Mataró |
| | Loredo; Alcantara | | | Stadium: Iluro; Referee: Subira |

Campionat de Catalunya

| 20 October 1918 Jornada 1 | CS Sabadell | 0 - 2 | FC Barcelona | Sabadell |
| | | | Martínez; Alcántara | Stadium: Camp de la Creu Alta; Referee: Torrens |

| 27 October 1918 Jornada 2 | RCD Español | 4 - 1 | FC Barcelona | Barcelona |
| | Julià; Gràcia; Zabala; Alfaro | | Sagi | Stadium: Velòdrom Parc d'Sports; Referee: Vinyes |

| 10 November 1918 Jornada 3 | FC Barcelona | 8 - 0 | Atlètic FC de Sabadell | Barcelona |
| | Lakatos; Sagi; Alcántara; Martínez | | | Stadium: Camp del carrer Indústria; Referee: Lemmel |

| 24 November 1918 Jornada 4 | FC Espanya | 0 - 2 | FC Barcelona | Barcelona |
| | | | Martínez | Stadium: Camp del carrer Indústria; Referee: Alemany |

| 1 December 1918 Jornada 5 | FC Internacional | 1 - 5 | FC Barcelona | Barcelona |
| | Millán | | Martínez; Sagi; Alcántara | Stadium: Camp del carrer Galileu; Referee: Torrens |

| 8 December 1918 Jornada 6 | FC Barcelona | 4 - 0 | CS Sabadell | Barcelona |
| | Lakatos; Sagi; Sancho | | | Stadium: Camp del carrer Indústria; Referee: Sanpere |

| 22 December 1918 Jornada 7 | FC Barcelona | 0 - 0 | RCD Español | Barcelona |
| | | | | Stadium: Camp del carrer Indústria; Referee: Vinyes |

| 12 January 1919 Jornada 8 | Atlètic FC de Sabadell | 0 - 5 | FC Barcelona | Barcelona |
| | | | Alcántara; Martínez; Lakatos; Sagi | Stadium: Camp del carrer Indústria; Referee: Baró |

| 19 January 1919 Jornada 9 | FC Barcelona | 3 - 1 | FC Espanya | Barcelona |
| | Alcántara; Martínez | | Goal | Stadium: Camp del carrer Indústria; Referee: Baró |

| 26 January 1919 Jornada 10 | FC Barcelona | 1 - 0 | FC Internacional | Barcelona |
| | Lakatos | | | Stadium: Camp del carrer Indústria; Referee: Quirante Pineda |

| 2 March 1919 Final - anada | FC Barcelona | 8 - 2 | CE Europa | Barcelona |
| | Lakatos; Alcántara; Vinyals; Sancho | | Alegre; Nogués | Stadium: Camp del carrer Indústria; Referee: Ferrer Elias |

| 9 March 1919 Final - tornada | CE Europa | 2 - 6 | FC Barcelona | Barcelona |
| | Alegre | | Martínez; Lakatos; Sagi | Referee: Peris |

Campionat d'Espanya

| 13 April 1919 Quarts de final - anada | FC Barcelona | 6 - 0 | Real Sociedad de Fútbol | Barcelona |
| | Martínez; Alcántara; Vinyals; Lakatos | | | Stadium: Camp del carrer Indústria; Referee: Montero (Central) |

| 20 April 1919 Quarts de final - tornada | Real Sociedad de Fútbol | 1 - 3 | FC Barcelona | Sant Sebastià |
| 16:30 | Arrate | | Martínez | Stadium: Estadi d'Atotxa; Referee: Ruete |

| 28 April 1919 Semifinale - First leg | FC Barcelona | 4 - 3 | Sevilla FC | Madrid |
| | Lakatos; Martínez; Alcántara | | Armet | Referee: Montero (Central) |

| 30 April 1919 Semifinale - Second leg | FC Barcelona | 3 - 0 | Sevilla FC | Madrid |
| | Garchitorena; Alcántara | | | Referee: Montero (Central) |

| 18 May 1919 Finale | Arenas Club de Getxo | 5 - 2 | FC Barcelona | Madrid |
| 17:30 | Sesúmaga 12' 80' 96'; F. Peña 116'; Ibaibarriaga 119' | | Vinyals 38'; Lakatos 55' | Stadium: Estadio del Paseo Martínez Campos; Referee: Montero (Central) |
