= Emil Walter (footballer) =

German footballer and manager (1900–1952)

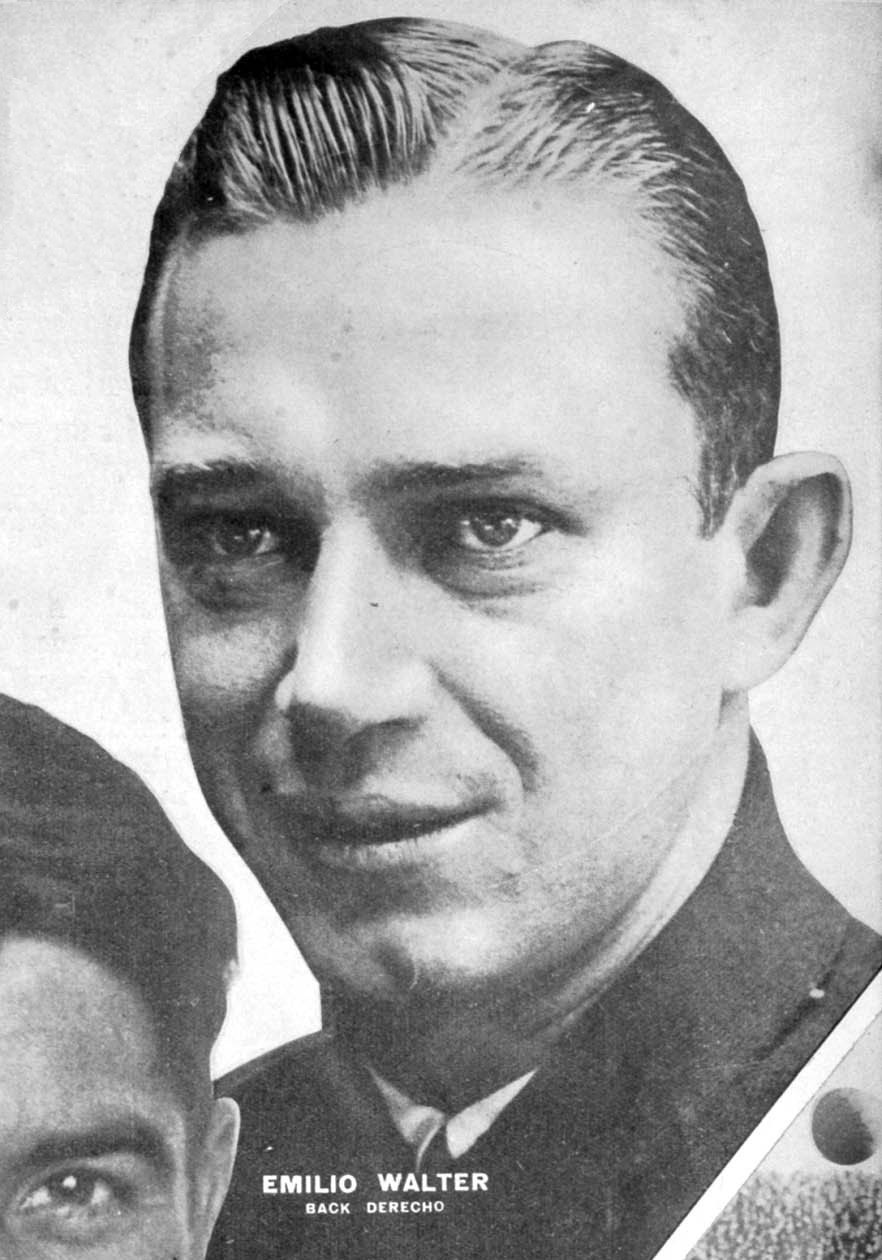
- Walter in 1928

Personal information
- Full name: Emil Walter Burkhard
- Date of birth: 7 April 1900
- Place of birth: Pforzheim, Germany
- Date of death: 1 March 1952 (aged 51)
- Place of death: Pforzheim, Germany
- Position: Defender

Youth career
- –1916: Germania Brötzingen

Senior career*
Years	Team	Apps	(Gls)
1916–1921	Germania Brötzingen		
1922–1924	Figueres		
1924–1931	Barcelona	81	(5)

International career
1923–1929	Catalonia	2	(0)

Managerial career
- Germania Brötzingen
- 1935–1937: RSV 09 Hückeswagen
- * Club domestic league appearances and goals

Emil Walter Burkhard (7 April 1900 – 1 March 1952) was a German footballer who played as a defender for FC Barcelona. Considered by some as Spain's best defender in the 1920s, he captained Barça to its first La Liga title in 1929.

== Club career ==
=== Early career ===
Born in the Baden-Württemberg city of Pforzheim on 7 April 1900, Walter began playing football with his Oberrealschule team, celebrating his first major victory with them against the local gymnasium. In 1916, the 16-year-old Walter made his senior debut with his hometown club Germania Brötzingen, with whom he achieved promotion to the Kreisliga in 1920. At the time, it was not possible to live exclusively from football, so he also worked as a foreign trade clerk at the Bijouterie-Fabrik Pforzheim, which led him to learn several foreign languages.

In the early 1920s, the German economy was struggling to recover after the First World War, so he decided to take advantage of his contacts in Spain to join the Ferreteria Costa Ferran in 1922, a metal company based in Figueres, Catalonia, and whose new boss was also chairman of UE Figueres, with whom Walter was already playing just two weeks after his arrival in Spain. In an interview to Mundo Deportivo in 1950, he stated that he "came to Spain with purely commercial activities", but soon began playing for Figueres, where he won a Girona championship.

=== FC Barcelona ===
His precise passing, horse lungs, and exceptional shooting power impressed Barcelona's coach Jack Greenwell in a friendly match against them in 1922, so Greenwell invited him to a trial that Walter passed, but was then unable to sign him because he still had to do his job at the metal company in Figueres. It was not until 1924 that Walter gave up from this trade, signing for Barça with a fixed salary of 600 pesetas per month, plus 200 pesetas for every win.

Walter quickly adapted to his new surroundings, speaking both Spanish and Catalan, which allowed him to "win the sympathy of the Blaugrana members like no other foreign player", becoming known in Spain as Emilio. He was also quick to establish himself as a regular starter and one of the cornerstones of Barça's first golden era in the 1920s, which also included Josep Planas, Agustín Sancho, Emili Sagi-Barba, and Josep Samitier. The following year, on 12 April 1925, Walter started for Barça in a friendly against Uruguayan side Nacional Montevideo at Les Corts, which ended in a 2–2 draw. The following month, on 10 May, he started in the 1925 Copa del Rey final against Arenas de Getxo in Seville, helping his side to a 2–0 victory.

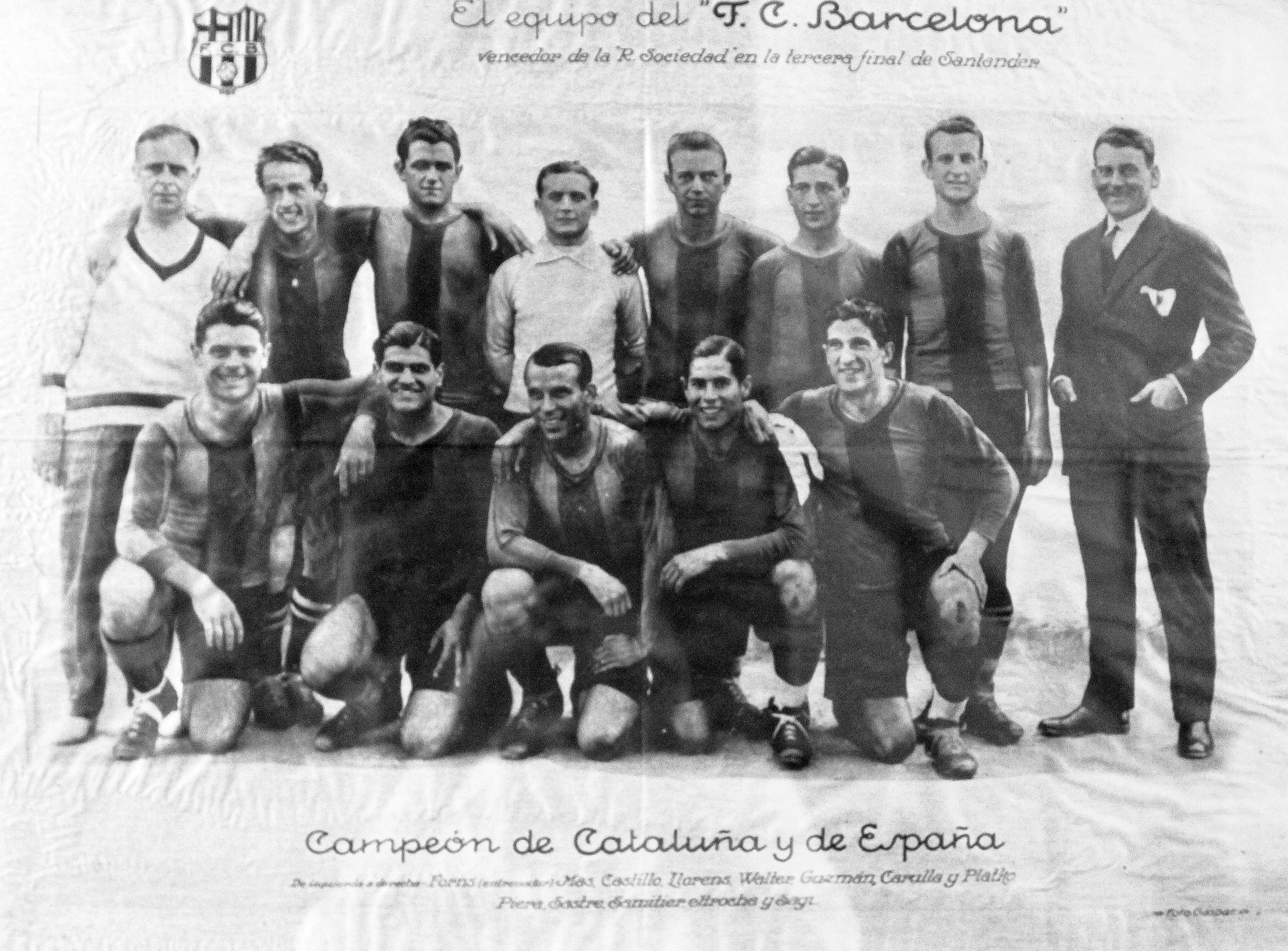
Walter (standing, fourth from right) with the Barcelona squad that won the 1928 Copa del Rey.

Walter stayed at Barça for seven years, from 1924 until 1931, helping his side win a further two Copa del Rey titles in 1926 and 1928, six Catalan championships, and the inaugural edition of the Spanish top-flight in 1929. He was considered Spain's best defender in the 1920s; for instance, on the occasion of Barça's tour of South America in 1928, the journalists of the Argentinian sports magazine El Gráfico described him as one of Barcelona's great figures. In total, he scored 16 goals in 248 matches for Barça, (Note: Some sources state 17 goals in 218 matches,) including 11 goals in 148 competitive matches, of which 3 came in 27 La Liga matches.

== International career ==
As a Barça player, Walter was eligible to play for the Catalan national team, making his debut at the inauguration of the Montjuïc Stadium, on 20 May 1929, against Bolton Wanderers.

== Managerial career ==
After returning to Germany, Walter coached his former club, Germania Brötzingen, until 1935, when he took over RSV 09 Hückeswagen, leading them to the championship in the 2nd district league, thus achieving promotion to the next level. After a brief stint in the Bergisches Land region and Gaggenau, he returned to his hometown, Pforzheim, in 1941. During the World War II, he was with the German troops on the Pyrenees border when he suddenly defected and grabbed his officer's motorcycle to travel to the Montjuïc Stadium to reunite with his good friend Picard.

The turmoil caused by the War brought hardship to the Walter family, so some of his former Barça teammates and friends organized a relief fund for him in 1947, which was supported with a special stamp (without postal value) that was issued in 1948. At Barça's invitation, Walter and his wife traveled to Catalonia in March 1950, being greeted by a large crowd at the train station on 15 March, and taking the kick-off for a tribute match between Barça and Espanyol at Les Corts on 26 March 1950, which 40,000 people attended.

== Death ==
Walter died of cancer in Pforzheim, on 1 March 1952, at the age of 51.

== Honours ==
Barcelona

- La Liga: 1929
- Copa del Rey: 1925, 1926, 1928
- Campionat de Catalunya (6): 1924–25, 1926–27, 1927–28, 1929–30, 1930–31, 1931–32
