= Josep Samitier =

Spanish football player and manager (1902–1972)

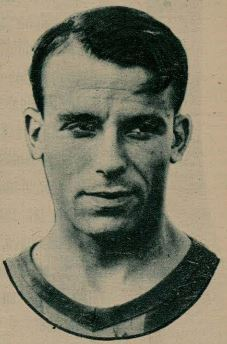
- Samitier in 1928

Personal information
- Full name: José Enrique Ignacio Samitier Vilalta
- Date of birth: 2 February 1902
- Place of birth: Barcelona, Spain
- Date of death: 4 May 1972 (aged 70)
- Place of death: Barcelona, Spain
- Position: Forward

Youth career
- 1914–1916: Internacional

Senior career*
Years	Team	Apps	(Gls)
1917–1919	FC Internacional	18	(1)
1919–1932	Barcelona	174	(133)
1932–1934	Real Madrid	14	(7)
1936–1939	Nice	48	(21)
Total		254	(162)

International career
1920–1936	Catalan XI	26	(20)
1920–1931	Spain	21	(2)

Managerial career
- 1936: Atlético Madrid
- 1942: Nice
- 1944–1947: Barcelona
- * Club domestic league appearances and goals

Medal record

Men's football

Representing Spain

Olympic Games
Silver medal – second place	1920 Antwerp	Team competition

Josep Samitier Vilalta (Catalan pronunciation: [ʒuˈzɛp səmitiˈe]; 2 February 1902 – 4 May 1972), also known as José Samitier, was a Spanish football player, manager and scout who played as a midfielder for FC Barcelona, Real Madrid, OGC Nice, the Catalan XI, and Spain. He later coached Atlético Madrid, Nice and Barcelona and worked as a scout for both Barcelona and Real Madrid.

During his playing career with Barcelona, Samitier scored 187 official goals and was the club's all-time highest goalscorer at the time of his retirement. As of 2020, he is the club's fifth all-time top goalscorer behind Luis Suárez, László Kubala, César, and Lionel Messi. As a player, Samitier pioneered the midfield general role and was nicknamed Surrealista (The Surrealist) and Home Llagosta (The Grasshopper Man) due to his style.

As a manager, he led Barcelona to a title in La Liga in 1945, and as a scout he recruited another Barcelona legend, László Kubala. However, Samitier was later accused of acting as a double agent when the club tried to sign Alfredo Di Stéfano, and in the 1960s, he fell out with Helenio Herrera and went to work for Real Madrid. Despite his role in the Di Stéfano affair, twice defecting to Real Madrid, and his friendship with Francisco Franco, Samitier remained a legendary figure of FC Barcelona. When he died in 1972, he was given a state funeral and a street that leads to Camp Nou.

== Club career ==
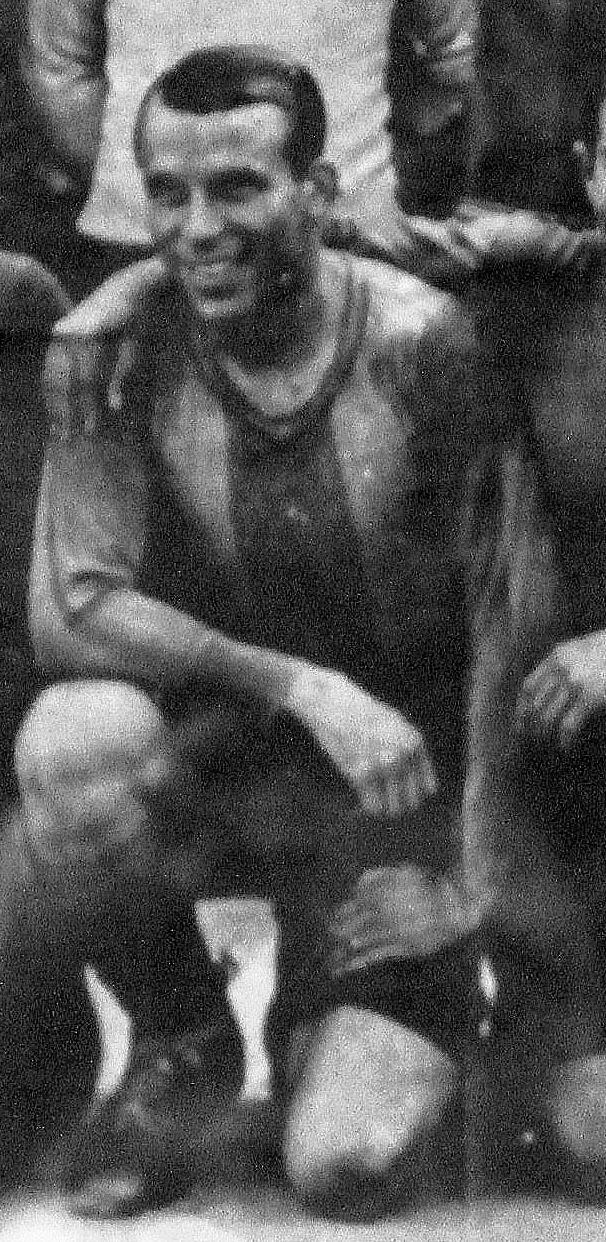
Samitier with Barça in 1928

=== Early life ===
Born in Barcelona, Catalonia, Samitier played as a junior for FC Internacional before, at the age of 17, he made his debut for FC Barcelona in 1919. As his signing-on bonus, he received a luminous watch and a three-piece suit. Among his teammates at the club was his childhood friend Sagibarba. During holidays at the Catalan resort of Cadaqués, Samitier and Sagibarba had played football with, among others, Salvador Dalí. He was also friends with the famous Spanish artist Salvador Dalí.

=== FC Barcelona ===
By 1925 Samitier was the highest-paid player in Spain. He was a member of the legendary FC Barcelona team, coached by Jack Greenwell, that, apart from Sagibarba, also included Paulino Alcántara, Ricardo Zamora, Félix Sesúmaga and, later, Franz Platko. Between 1919 and 1933 he won twelve Campionat de Catalunya titles, five Copa del Rey and the very first La Liga title in the 1929 season. Among the goals he scored were four in the Copa del Rey finals of 1922, 1925, 1926 and 1928.

=== Madrid CF ===
In 1933 an aging Samiter found himself in dispute with the FC Barcelona management and he was dropped from the first team. Real Madrid, then known as Madrid CF, were quick to take advantage of the situation. Samitier was reunited with both his friend Ricardo Zamora and then Francisco Bru. Although his career with the Madrid club was short, he did help them win a title in La Liga 1932–33 and the Copa de España in 1934.

=== Samitier Tribute ===
The tribute match to Samitier was held on 13 May 1934 at Estadio Chamartín in Madrid, between Madrid FC and Espanyol, and Samitier scored both the first and the last goals of an 8–2 win. Other Madrid goalscorers include the likes of Eugenio, Hilario, Luis Regueiro and Lazcano, while José Padrón scored one of Espanyol's consolation goals.

Madrid: Zamora (Cayol 45´); Quesada, Maciá, P. Regueiro (Sauto), Bonet, Gurruchaga, (Valle 45´), Lazcano, L. Regueiro (Olivares 45´) Samitier, Hilario and Eugenio.

Espanyol: Martorell (Eizaguirre 45´); Mas, Pérez, Cifuentes, Solé (Antero 45´), Cristià, Prats, Edelmiro, Iriondo, Padrón and Bosch.

=== Exile in France ===
In 1936 Samitier made a brief start to his career as a coach. He succeeded Fred Pentland at Atlético Madrid in the middle of the season, but failed to prevent them from being relegated. However, Samitier's new career and Atlético's relegation were postponed with the start of the Spanish Civil War. He found himself arrested by an anarchist militia, but was eventually released and left for France on a warship. His escape was later used by the Nationalist side in an account printed in Marca. In October 1936 he joined OGC Nice as a player, where he was reunited once again with Ricardo Zamora. He subsequently scored 21 goals in 48 matches for the French team. He eventually retired as a player in 1939 and was briefly coach at OGC Nice in 1942.

=== Return to Barcelona ===
Samitier returned to Spain and became manager of CF Barcelona in 1944. In 1945 he guided them to only their second ever La Liga title. Then they beat the Copa del Generalísimo winners Atlético Bilbao to win the Copa de Oro Argentina. Samitier subsequently worked as the clubs chief scout and was instrumental in the recruitment of another CF Barcelona legend Ladislao Kubala.

In the summer of 1950 Kubala arrived in Spain with his own team, Hungaria. The team was made up of fellow refugees fleeing Eastern Europe. They played a series of friendlies against a Madrid Select XI, a Spain XI and RCD Español. During these games, Kubala was spotted by both Real Madrid and Samitier. Kubala was offered a contract by Real but was then persuaded by Samitier to sign for CF Barcelona. It has been suggested that Samitier used his connections within Francoist Spain to help arrange the transfer. In the midst of the Cold War, Kubala's escape to the West was used by Francoist Spain and was made into a film The Stars Search for Peace which saw Kubala and Samitier playing themselves.

== International career ==
In 1920, together with Ricardo Zamora, Félix Sesúmaga, Pichichi and José María Belauste, Samitier was a member of the first ever Spain national team. The squad, coached by Francisco Bru, won the silver medal at the 1920 Olympic Games. He subsequently made 21 appearances and scored 2 goals for Spain.

Samitier also played 26 games and scored at least 20 goals for the Catalan XI. However, records from the era do not always include accurate statistics and he may have played and scored more. Together with Paulino Alcántara, Sagibarba and Zamora, he helped the Catalan XI win the Prince of Asturias Cup twice in the 1920s, winning the inter-regional competition in 1923–24 and 1926. In the 1924 final, he scored twice in a 4–4 draw against Castile/Madrid XI and scored again in the replay as the Catalan team won 3–2. Catalonia faced Czechoslovakia twice in 1925 and 1926, and Samitier managed to score in both games, a 2–1 win and a 2–1 defeat, respectively. His last game for the Catalan XI was his own testimonial on 19 January 1936 at the Les Corts. He scored in a 1–1 draw with SK Sidenice of Czechoslovakia.

== Career statistics ==
=== Club ===
Appearances and goals by club, season and competition
Club	Season	League			Cup		Regional		Friendly		Total	
Club	Season	Division	Apps	Goals	Apps	Goals	Apps	Goals	Apps	Goals	Apps	Goals
Internacional	1916–17	La Liga	0	0	0	0	5	0			5	0
Internacional	1917–18	La Liga	0	0	0	0	4	0			4	0
Internacional	1918–19	La Liga	0	0	0	0	9	1			9	1
Internacional	Total		0	0	0	0	18	1			18	1
FC Barcelona	1918–19	La Liga	0	0	0	0	0	0	1	1	1	1
FC Barcelona	1919–20	La Liga	0	0	3	0	10	0	30	2	43	2
FC Barcelona	1920–21	La Liga	0	0	0	0	12	1	33	0	45	1
FC Barcelona	1921–22	La Liga	0	0	5	2	7	0	37	22	49	24
FC Barcelona	1922–23	La Liga	0	0	0	0	10	0	48	21	58	21
FC Barcelona	1923–24	La Liga	0	0	7	5	10	14	27	41	44	60
FC Barcelona	1924–25	La Liga	0	0	8	10	12	10	17	12	37	32
FC Barcelona	1925–26	La Liga	0	0	4	8	10	7	6	3	21	17
FC Barcelona	1926–27	La Liga	0	0	7	3	14	21	25	23	46	47
FC Barcelona	1927–28	La Liga	0	0	15	21	10	16	10	13	35	50
FC Barcelona	1928–29	La Liga	13	7	7	4	4	2	6	4	30	17
FC Barcelona	1929–30	La Liga	2	3	9	7	9	2	8	8	28	20
FC Barcelona	1930–31	La Liga	1	0	3	2	4	5	12	19	20	26
FC Barcelona	1931–32	La Liga	12	11	7	1	12	14	5	2	36	28
FC Barcelona	1932–33	La Liga	0	0	0	0	6	10	4	3	10	13
FC Barcelona	1934–35	La Liga	0	0	0	0	0	0	1	2	1	2
FC Barcelona	1935–36	La Liga	0	0	0	0	0	0	1	3	1	3
FC Barcelona	Total		28	21	73	63	130	102	271	179	504	365
Real Madrid CF	1932–33	La Liga	6	3	0	0					6	3
Real Madrid CF	1933–34	La Liga	2	1	8	5	5	3			15	9
Real Madrid CF	Total		8	4	8	5	5	3			21	12
Career total			36	25	81	68	153	106	271	179	543	378

=== International ===
Scores and results list Spain's goal tally first, score column indicates score after each Samitier goal.

List of international goals scored by Josep Samitier
No.	Date	Venue	Appearance	Opponent	Score	Result	Competition
1	21 December 1924	Camp de Les Corts, Barcelona, Spain	11	Austria	2–1	2–1	Friendly
2	13 December 1931	Dalymount Park, Dublin, Republic of Ireland	21	Republic of Ireland	4–0	5–0	Friendly

== Honours ==
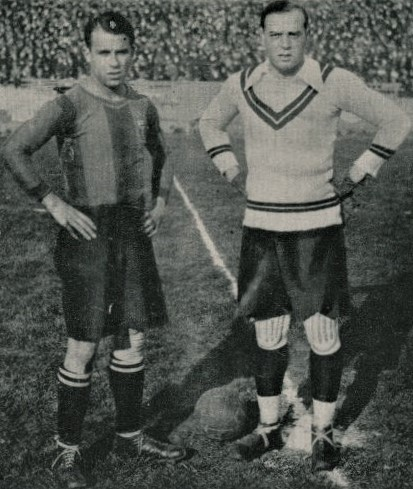
Samitier (left) with Ricardo Zamora of Espanyol in 1929

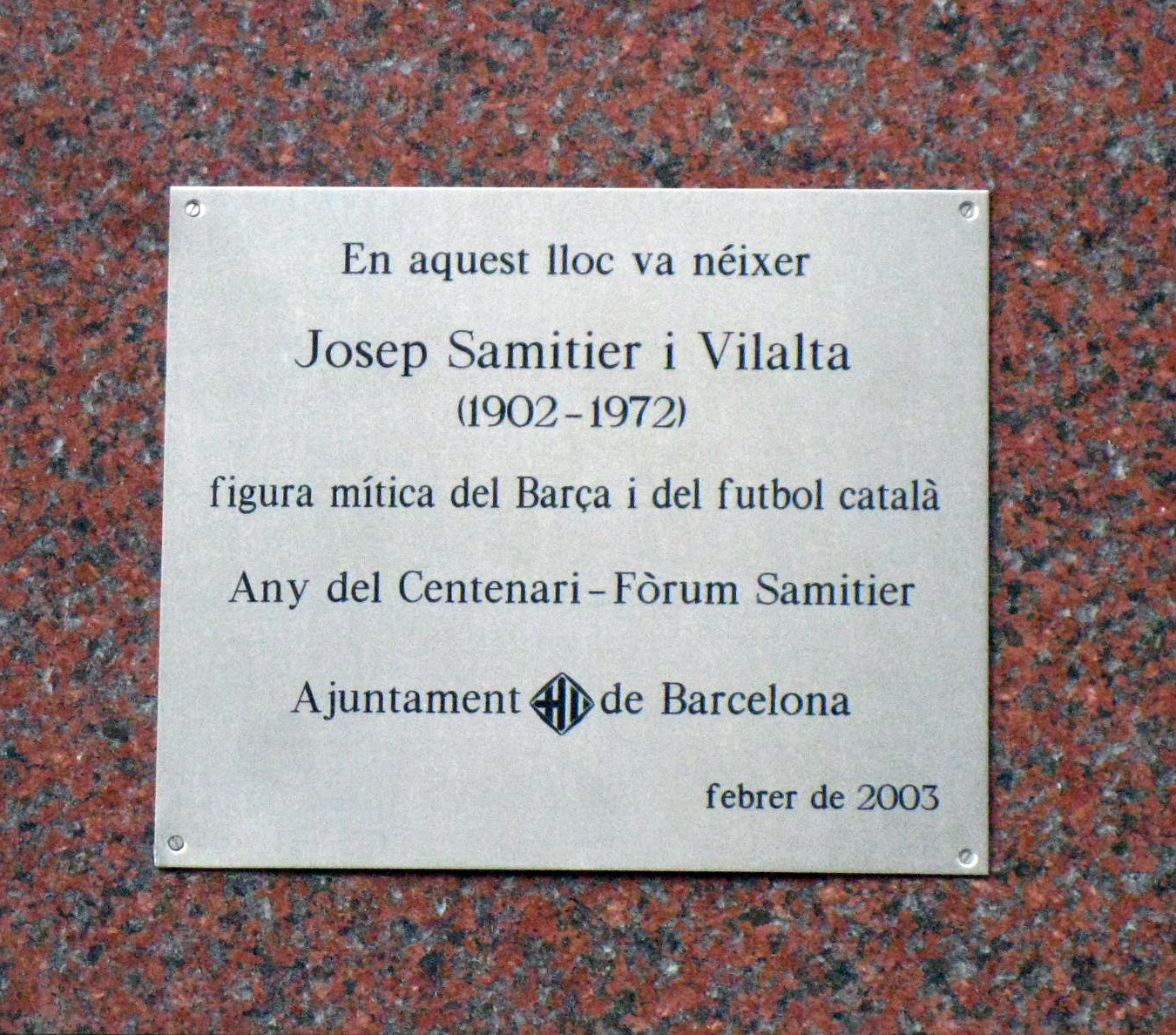
A commemorative plaque marking the birthplace of Josep Samitier (1902–1972), legendary Barça player and icon of Catalan football.

=== Player ===
FC Barcelona

- La Liga (1): 1929
- Copa del Rey (5): 1920, 1922, 1925, 1926, 1928
- Catalan Championship (12): 1918–19, 1919–20, 1920–21, 1921–22, 1923–24, 1924–25, 1925–26, 1926–27, 1927–28, 1929–30, 1930–31, 1931–32

Madrid CF

- La Liga (1): 1932–33
- Copa del Rey (1): 1934

Spain

- Olympic Games silver medal: 1920

Catalan XI

- Prince of Asturias Cup (2): 1923–24, 1926

=== Manager ===
CF Barcelona

- La Liga (1): 1944–45
- Copa de Oro Argentina (1): 1945
