= Josep Sastre =

Spanish footballer

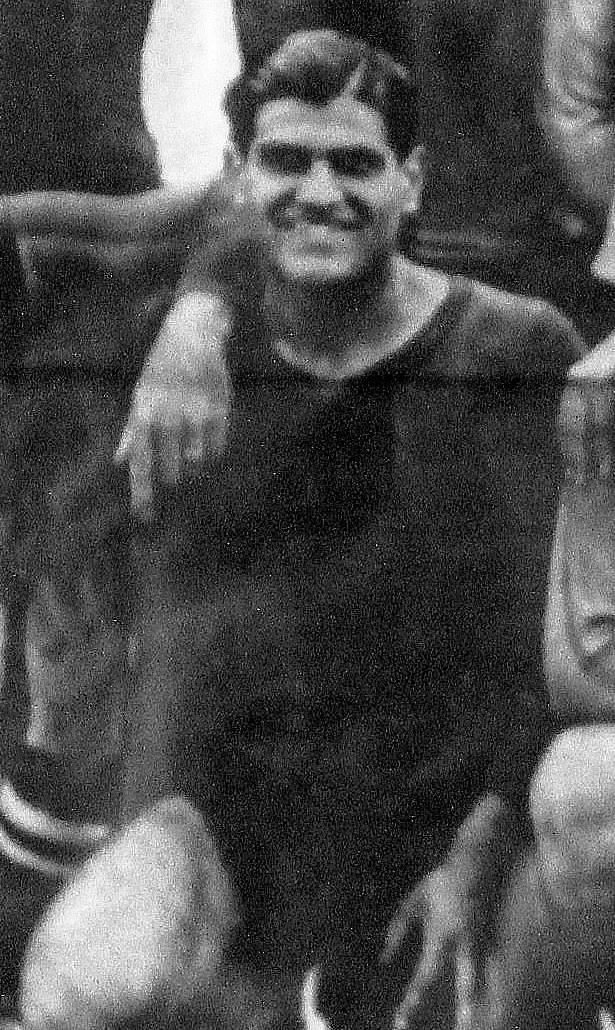
- Sastre in the 1928–29 season

Personal information
- Full name: Josep Sastre Perciba
- Date of birth: 25 June 1906
- Place of birth: Barcelona, Spain
- Date of death: 2 June 1962 (aged 55)
- Place of death: Barcelona, Spain
- Position: Midfielder

Youth career
- 1922–1923: FC Gràcia

Senior career*
Years	Team	Apps	(Gls)
1923–1926	FC Gràcia		
1926–1932	Barcelona	167	(116)
1932–1933	Espanyol		
1933	Barcelona		
1933–1934	EC Granollers		
1934	Club Français		
1934	CF Badalona		
1934–1935	Terrassa FC		

International career
1925-1933	Catalonia	13	(9)
1930	Spain	1	(1)

Managerial career
- 1950–1951: Girona
Medal record
Catalonia
Prince of Asturias Cup
Gold medal – first place	1926 Prince of Asturias Cup	Team
- * Club domestic league appearances and goals

Josep Sastre Perciba (25 June 1906 – 2 June 1962) was a Spanish footballer who played as a midfielder and forward. He was best known for his stint with Barcelona in the 1920s and 30s.

== Club career ==
Born in Gràcia, he began his career at FC España, a club that in 1923 adopted the name FC Gràcia. His brilliant performances at FC Gràcia eventually drew the attention of Barcelona who signed him in 1926, with whom he played for the next 6 years, scoring 116 goals in 167 matches. In 1928, Sastre played in the infamous Copa del Rey final between Barcelona and Real Sociedad at El Sardinero, a final that needed 3 matches to be decided because the first two ended in 1–1 draws. In the third match, Sastre scored in a 3–1 win that gave the title to Barça. Sastre scored the first ever goal in a Derbi barceloní, as Barcelona beat Espanyol 1–0 on 7 April 1929. He was part of the Barcelona team that won the first-ever La Liga title in 1929. He also helped the club win five Campionat de Catalunya, including three back-to-back title between 1929 and 1932.

In 1932 he signed for Espanyol, but was unable to play many games after undergoing a stomach surgery. Once he recovered, however, he returned to Barcelona in 1933, and once he resigned he moved to Granollers SC, to Club Français in Paris, CF Badalona and ended his career at Terrassa FC. After he retired, he coached several Catalan teams, including Girona.

== International career ==
Sastre made one appearance with the Spain national football team in a 1–0 win over Czechoslovakia on 1 January 1930, scoring his side's game winning goal on his debut.

Like many other Barcelona players at the time, Sastre was summoned to play several matches for the Catalan national team during the 1920s and 1930s, however, due to the little statistical rigor that the newspapers had at that time, the exact amount of caps he earned and goals he scored is uncertain. Together with Paulino Alcántara, Josep Samitier and Ricardo Zamora, he was part of the great Catalan side of the twenties that won the last edition of the Prince of Asturias Cup, an inter-regional competition organized by the RFEF. On 15 May 1927, Sastre netted a hat-trick in a friendly against the Centro team (a Castile/Madrid XI) in a 3–0 win at Les Corts. In the following game a month later, on 16 June, he went one better with four goals against a Brussels XI at the same venue.

== Honours ==
Barcelona

- La Liga:
  - Champions (1): 1929
- Copa del Rey:
  - Champions (1): 1928
- Campionat de Catalunya:
  - Champions (5): 1926–27, 1927–28, 1929–30, 1930–31, 1931–32

=== International ===
Catalonia XI

- Prince of Asturias Cup:
  - Champions (1): 1926
