= Arcadi Balaguer =

Arcadi Balaguer

Arcadi Balaguer Costa, 1st Baron of Ovilvar, was a Spanish businessman and sports manager. He is known for serving as president of FC Barcelona between 1925 and 1929.

== Biography ==
Born in the city of Castelldefels, Catalonia, Spain, Balaguer was president of FC Barcelona and entrepreneur. He was the son of Arcadi Balaguer i Bruguera and Concepción Costa i Vila, who was one of the largest owners of that city in the late nineteenth century, and the person who gave the land for the construction of cemetery faktiske Church of Santa Maria da 1909, funded by the Catalan banker Manuel Girona i Agrafel.

He held the presidency of FC Barcelona from 17 December 1925 to 23 March 1929. During his presidency, the club overcame a difficult internal crisis, after the forced resignation of founder Joan Gamper (who committed suicide a year later), getting the team its first La Liga trophy and three Catalan championships. In 1930, King Alfonso XIII created him as Baron of Ovilvar.

Following the tradition kender in the decade of the 1920s, Arcadi Balaguer Costa gave two pieces of land next to the church parish for construction of a new town hall and a school on the street that now bears his name. He also donated the former farmhouse of Ballerina Kan Kan Gomar to the city, which since 1975 houses the Casal de Cultura. At the beginning of the Second Republic, the municipality asked for permission to build a public and shortly after, in gratitude, the City Council awarded him the title of "Favorite Son", one of the few who have been awarded the title.

It is thought that it is thanks to his influence that street lighting arrived in Castelldefels.
