= Domingo Carulla =

Spanish footballer

Personal information
- Full name: Domingo Carulla Bertran
- Birth name: Domènec Carulla i Bertran
- Date of birth: 25 October 1903
- Place of birth: L'Hospitalet de Llobregat, Spain
- Date of death: 31 December 1939 (aged 36)
- Place of death: Barcelona, Spain
- Position: Midfielder

Senior career*
Years	Team	Apps	(Gls)
1920–1922	FC Internacional		
1922–1923	UE Sants		
1923–1930	FC Barcelona	267	(15)
1930	Celta de Vigo		
1931–1932	UE Sants		

International career
1921–1927	Catalonia	8	(1)
1927	Spain B	1	(0)
- * Club domestic league appearances and goals

Domingo Carulla Bertran (25 October 1903 – 31 December 1939) was a Spanish footballer who spent most of his career at FC Barcelona. A midfielder with a remarkable technique, Carulla was an outstanding player in the so-called Golden Age of Barcelona, one of the brightest times in the entity's history.

He was a member of Spain's squad for the football tournament at the 1924 Summer Olympics, but did not play in any matches. He also played one match for Spain B.

== Club career ==
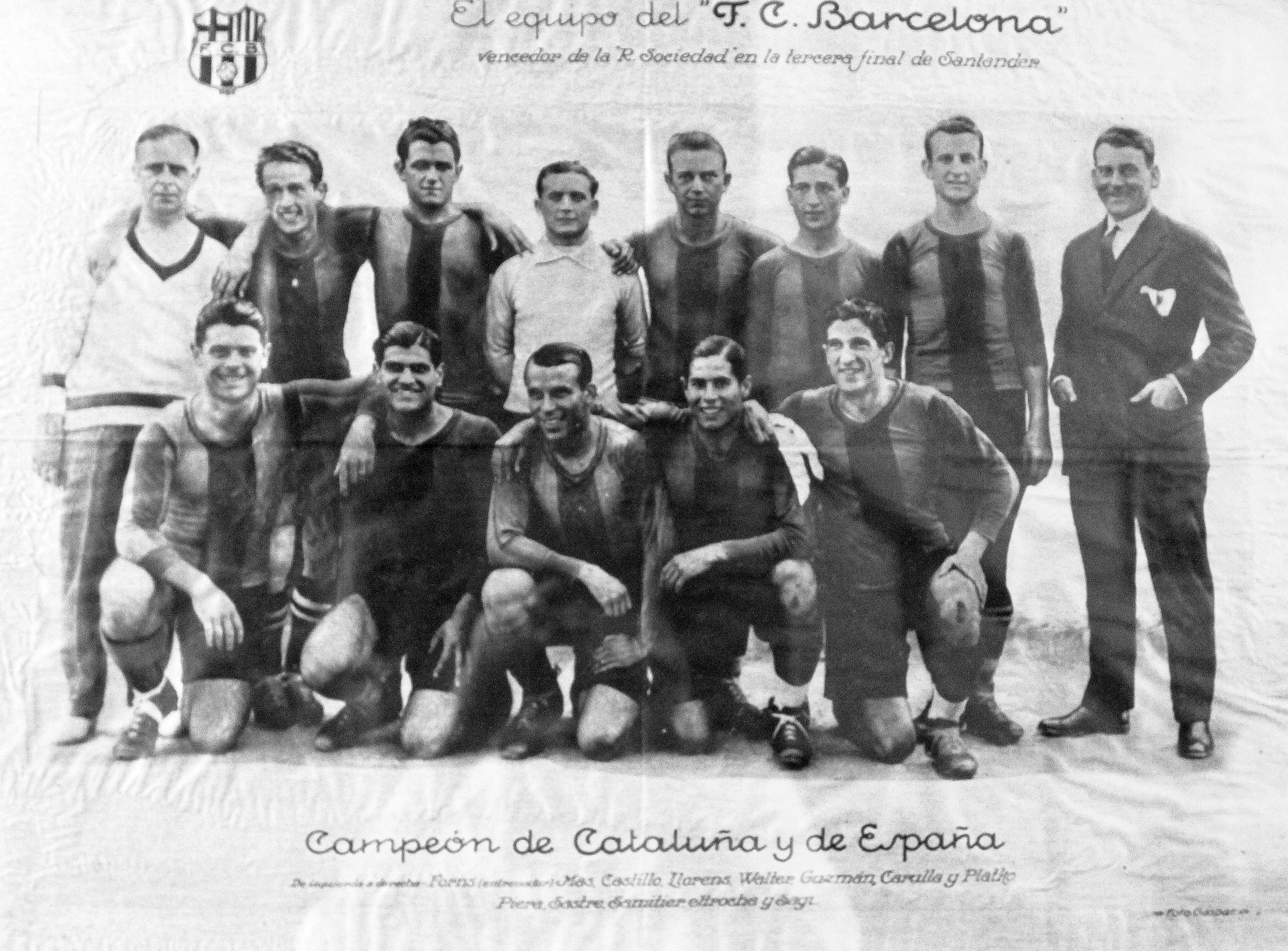
Domingo Carulla (back row, 2nd from left)

Born in L'Hospitalet de Llobregat, Carulla began his career in 1920, when he was only 17 years old, with FC Internacional, which in 1922 became UE Sants. His performance was sensational and he aroused the interest of FC Barcelona, which signed him in 1923, making his competitive debut in a Catalan championship match against Sabadell FC (2–1) at Les Corts on 21 October. He remained with Barça until 1930, being one of the most important pieces in Barça's midfield during the club's first golden age in the 20s, forming a great midfield line with the likes of Ramón Torralba and Agustín Sancho, one of the most powerful in Spanish football. In the eight campaigns that he spent with the club, he played 267 games, scoring 15 goals (9 goals in 121 competitive games) and winning three Copa del Rey (1925, 1926 and 1928) and five Catalan championships.

On 1 January 1929, Barcelona granted him a tribute match, which took place at the Camp de la Indústria when he was still an active player, and which pitted Barça against Racing de Ferrol, with the latter winning 7–2. On 21 September 1930, he played his last match for Barcelona against Sabadell FC (2–1) in a Catalan championship match.

Barça granted him a release letter due to the several injuries that he sustained. He accepted an offer from Celta de Vigo, where he played from October to December 1930 and, after three months of inactivity, he revived his boots at UE Sants once again, this time playing as a forward. His physique still gave him some days of glory in the second category of the Catalan Championship, like in a match against Sants-Horta (4–1) in March 1931 in which he scored a hat-trick.

== International career ==
Like many other FC Barcelona players of his time, he was eligible to play for the Catalonia national football team, and was part of the team that won the 1923–24 Prince of Asturias Cup, an inter-regional competition organized by the RFEF. Carulla played in the replay of the infamous final of the 1923–24 edition, replacing Ramón Trabal to help Catalonia beat a Castile/Madrid XI, netting once in a 3–2 victory that saw Catalonia lift their second Prince of Asturias Cup trophy.

He was a member of Spain's squad for the football tournament at the 1924 Summer Olympics, but did not play in any matches. He did not make his debut with the main national team, but he did play once with the B team. Carulla earned one international cap for the B side in a friendly held in Madrid against Portugal A side on 29 May 1927, helping his side to a 2–0 win.

== Later life and death ==
He married Antònia Comas Codina, a nurse, with whom he had two children: Joan (1925) and Mingo (1934). He lived thanks to a small business until, with the Spanish Civil War, he was expropriated from his house on Aragó Street. Then, in 1937, Carulla suffered a serious illness (tuberculosis) that admitted him to several sanatoriums. Barça organized a match for his benefit on 15 August 1937 at Les Corts. UE Sants gave him another on 12 September, a football match that was disputed by the Catalonian selection and the UE Sants of veterans, and between the Sants first team and the Barcelona reserve team, with both games ending in a two-goal draw.

Carulla died on 31 December 1939 at the Esperit Sant hospital in Santa Coloma de Gramenet. He was only 36 years old. He was buried in the municipal cemetery of Santa Coloma on 1 January 1940.

== Honours ==
=== Club ===
FC Barcelona

- La Liga: 1928–29
- Copa del Rey: 1925, 1926 and 1928
- Catalan championship: 1923–24, 1925–26, 1926–27, 1927–28 and 1928–29

=== International ===
Catalan XI

- Prince of Asturias Cup: 1923–24
