= Vicente Piera =

Spanish footballer

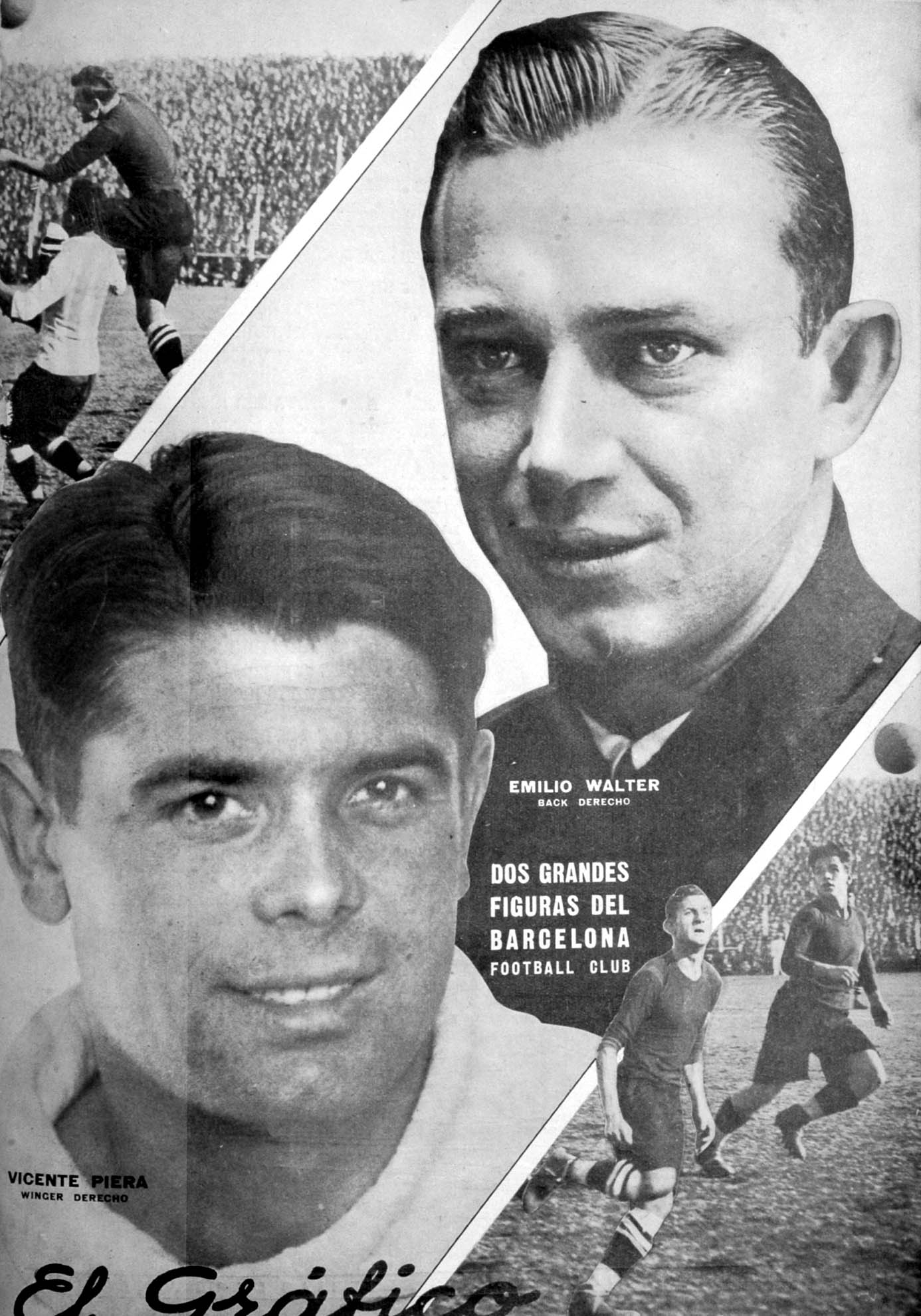
- Piera in 1928

Personal information
- Full name: Vicente Piera Pañella
- Date of birth: 11 June 1903
- Place of birth: Barcelona, Spain
- Date of death: 14 June 1960 (aged 57)
- Place of death: Barcelona, Spain
- Position: Striker

Senior career*
Years	Team	Apps	(Gls)
1920–1933	FC Barcelona	395	(123)

International career
1922–1931	Spain	15	(1)
1922–1931	Catalonia		
- * Club domestic league appearances and goals

Vicente Piera Pañella (11 June 1903 in Barcelona – 14 June 1960), known by the nickname "La Bruja" ("The Witch"), is a former Spanish footballer who spent most of his career at FC Barcelona.

== Club career ==
Born in Barcelona, Piera began to play for Centre d'Esports de Sants. Piera was one of the best right wings in the history of FC Barcelona, where he played from 1920 to 1921 season to 1932–33 season and appeared in 395 games, scored 123 goals. He also represented Spain at the 1924 Summer Olympics.

== International career ==
Piera reached the Spain national football team. He also played for the Catalonia national football team, and was part of the team that won two tournaments of the Prince of Asturias Cup in the 1920s, winning the inter-regional competition in 1923-24 and in 1926. Piera scored two goals in the infamous final of the 1923-24 edition against a Castile/Madrid XI, the first in a 4-4 draw and the second two days later in the replay, netting the winner in a 3-2 victory that saw Catalonia lift their second Prince of Asturias Cup trophy.

== Honours ==
=== Club ===
FC Barcelona

- La Liga (1): 1928–29
- Copa del Rey (4): 1922, 1925, 1926 and 1928

=== International ===
Catalan XI

- Prince of Asturias Cup: 1923-24 and 1926
