= FC Martinenc =

Association football club in Spain

Martinenc
- Full name: Fútbol Club Martinenc
- Nickname: Diablos Rojos (Red Devils)
- Founded: 1909; 117 years ago
- Ground: Camp del Guinardó, Barcelona, Catalonia, Spain
- Capacity: 1,000
- Chairman: Manuel Dengra Buendía
- Manager: Miguel López
- League: Tercera Federación – Group 5
- 2025–26: Lliga Elit, 2nd of 16 (promoted)
- Website: fcmartinenc.cat
Home colours

Fútbol Club Martinenc is a Spanish football team based in Barcelona, in the autonomous community of Catalonia. Founded in 1909, it plays in Tercera Federación – Group 5, holding home games at Camp Municipal del Guinardó.

== Seasons ==
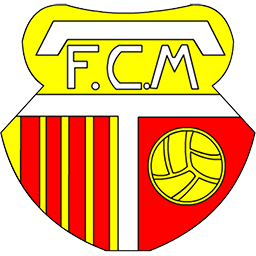
Logo used until 1940

Season	Tier	Division	Place	Copa del Rey
1928–29	5	2ª Reg. P.	3rd	
1929–30	5	2ª Reg. P.	3rd	
1930–31	5	2ª Reg. P.	1st	
1931–32	3	3ª	3rd	
1932–33	3	3ª	6th	
1933–34	5	1ª Reg. B		
1934–35	5	1ª Reg. B		
1935–36	5	1ª Reg. B		
1939–40	5	1ª Reg. B	6th	
1940–41	4	1ª Reg. A	6th	
1941–42	3	1ª Reg. A	2nd	
1942–43	3	1ª Reg. A	4th	
1943–44	3	3ª	6th	Second round
1944–45	3	3ª	4th	
1945–46	3	3ª	8th	
1946–47	3	3ª	3rd	
1947–48	3	3ª	9th	Second round
1948–49	3	3ª	12th	Second round
1949–50	3	3ª	9th	Third round
1950–51	3	3ª	1st	

Season	Tier	Division	Place	Copa del Rey
1951–52	3	3ª	12th	
1952–53	3	3ª	14th	
1953–54	3	3ª	18th	
1954–55	3	3ª	10th	
1955–56	3	3ª	10th	
1956–57	3	3ª	19th	
1957–58	3	3ª	20th	
1958–59	3	3ª	6th	
1959–60	3	3ª	6th	
1960–61	3	3ª	4th	
1961–62	3	3ª	13th	
1962–63	3	3ª	14th	
1963–64	4	1ª Reg.	5th	
1964–65	4	1ª Reg.	3rd	
1965–66	4	1ª Reg.	3rd	
1966–67	4	1ª Reg.	10th	
1967–68	4	1ª Reg.	3rd	
1968–69	4	Reg. Pref.	2nd	
1969–70	4	Reg. Pref.	19th	
1970–71	5	1ª Reg.	5th	

Season	Tier	Division	Place	Copa del Rey
1971–72	5	1ª Reg.	6th	
1972–73	5	1ª Reg.	5th	
1973–74	5	1ª Reg.	9th	
1974–75	5	1ª Reg.	2nd	
1975–76	4	Reg. Pref.	20th	
1976–77	5	1ª Reg.	8th	
1977–78	6	1ª Reg.	14th	
1978–79	6	1ª Reg.	2nd	
1979–80	6	1ª Reg.	10th	
1980–81	6	1ª Reg.	3rd	
1981–82	6	1ª Reg.	2nd	
1982–83	6	1ª Reg.	2nd	
1983–84	6	1ª Reg.	1st	
1984–85	5	Reg. Pref.	1st	
1985–86	4	3ª	14th	
1986–87	5	Reg. Pref.	10th	
1987–88	5	Reg. Pref.	9th	
1988–89	4	3ª	8th	
1989–90	4	3ª	4th	
1990–91	4	3ª	6th	First round

Season	Tier	Division	Place	Copa del Rey
1991–92	4	3ª	15th	First round
1992–93	4	3ª	5th	
1993–94	4	3ª	7th	
1994–95	4	3ª	19th	
1995–96	5	1ª Cat.	7th	
1996–97	5	1ª Cat.	19th	
1997–98	6	Pref. Terr.	10th	
1998–99	6	Pref. Terr.	2nd	
1999–2000	6	Pref. Terr.	2nd	
2000–01	5	1ª Cat.	7th	
2001–02	5	1ª Cat.	16th	
2002–03	5	1ª Cat.	16th	
2003–04	6	Pref. Terr.	14th	
2004–05	7	1ª Terr.	2nd	
2005–06	7	1ª Terr.	2nd	
2006–07	6	Pref. Terr.	16th	
2007–08	7	1ª Terr.	4th	
2008–09	7	1ª Terr.	6th	
2009–10	7	1ª Terr.	3rd	
2010–11	7	1ª Terr.	1st	

Season	Tier	Division	Place	Copa del Rey
2011–12	5	1ª Cat.	7th	
2012–13	5	1ª Cat.	4th	
2013–14	5	1ª Cat.	1st	
2014–15	4	3ª	19th	
2015–16	5	1ª Cat.	5th	
2016–17	5	1ª Cat.	4th	
2017–18	5	1ª Cat.	2nd	
2018–19	4	3ª	21st	
2019–20	5	1ª Cat.	4th	
2020–21	5	1ª Cat.	8th	
2021–22	6	1ª Cat.	11th	
2022–23	6	1ª Cat.	9th	
2023–24	7	1ª Cat.	2nd	
2024–25	7	1ª Cat.	1st	
2025–26	6	Lliga Elit	2nd	
2026–27	5	3ª Fed.		

- 32 seasons in Tercera División
- 1 season in Tercera Federación

== Current squad ==
As of 26 September 2025

Note: Flags indicate national team as defined under FIFA eligibility rules; some limited exceptions apply. Players may hold more than one non-FIFA nationality.

No.	Pos.	Nation	Player
1	GK	ESP	Álex Lázaro
3	DF	ESP	Gerard Martínez
4	DF	ESP	Alex Torres
5	DF	ESP	Adrià Saro
6	MF	ESP	Juan Sosa
7	MF	ESP	Eugenio Plazuelo
8	FW	ESP	Dani Suárez
9	FW	ESP	David Pérez
10	MF	ESP	Edgar Tejada
11	FW	ESP	Ángel González
12	FW	GAM	Elhadji Baldeh

No.	Pos.	Nation	Player
13	GK	ESP	Victor Montoya
14	FW	ESP	Carlos González
15	MF	ESP	Kevin Alarcón
17	DF	ESP	Max Espigol
19	FW	ESP	Albert Aragonès
20	MF	ESP	Álex Garriga
21	MF	ESP	Adrián Navarro
22	FW	ESP	Victor Fabian
23	MF	ESP	Juan Valverde
24	MF	ESP	Ferran Sánchez
