= List of La Liga hat-tricks =

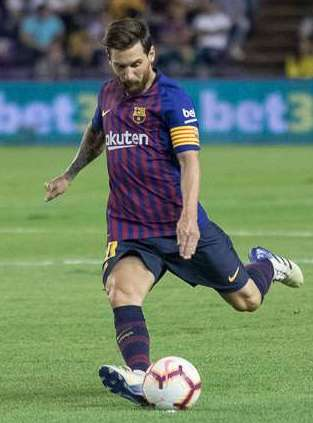
Lionel Messi is the player with the most La Liga hat-tricks in history.

Below is the complete list of players that have scored three goals (a hat-trick) or more in a single La Liga match since the league's inception in 1929. Over 100 players have scored at least one hat-trick throughout the history of the league.

Lionel Messi has scored 36 La Liga hat-tricks, all whilst playing for Barcelona, making him the player with the most hat-tricks in the competition's history. Cristiano Ronaldo is a close second place, recording 34 hat-tricks for Real Madrid; no other player has scored more than 23. Messi and Ronaldo also share the record for most hat-tricks in a single La Liga season, with Messi scoring eight in 2011–12 and Ronaldo equalling this feat in 2014–15. The record for most goals scored in a single La Liga match is seven, achieved by both Bata and László Kubala.

== Hat-tricks ==
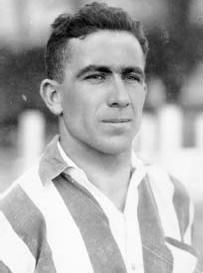
Bata scored seven goals in a 1931 match for Athletic Bilbao.

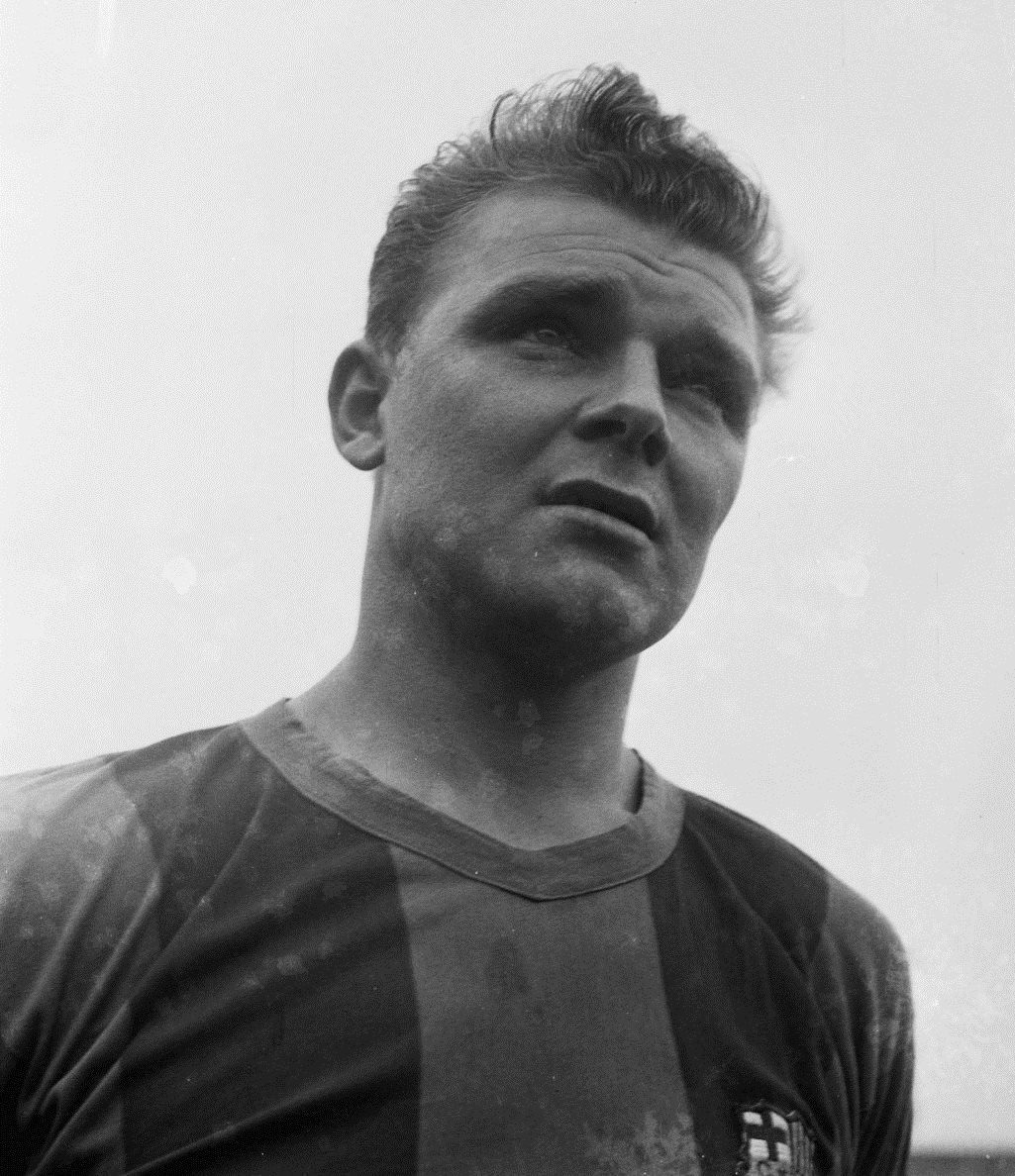
László Kubala scored seven goals in a 1952 match for Barcelona.

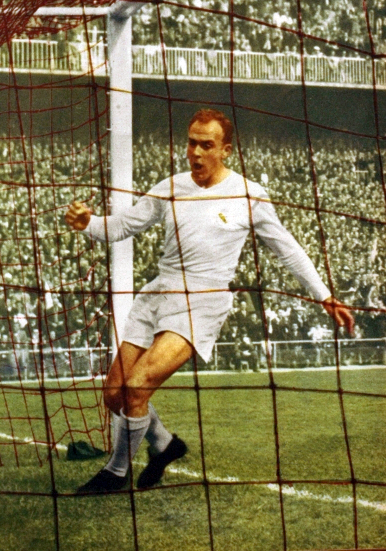
Alfredo Di Stéfano scored 22 league hat-tricks, all for Real Madrid.

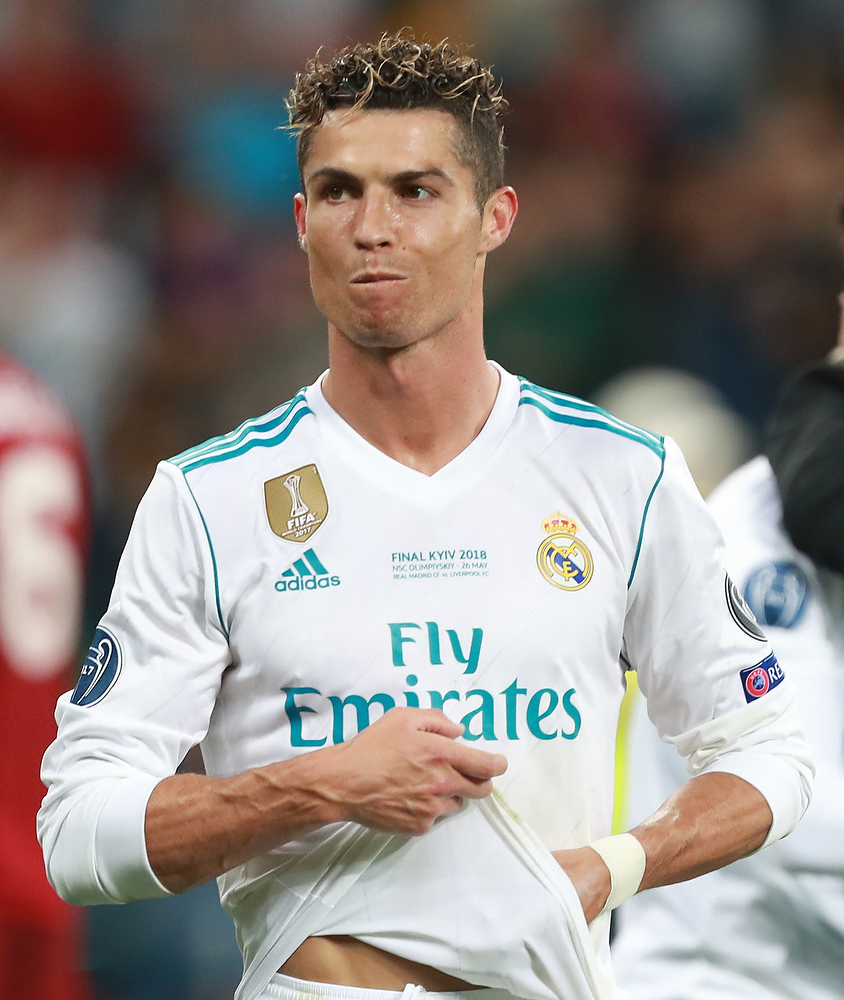
Cristiano Ronaldo scored 34 league hat-tricks for Real Madrid between 2010 and 2018.

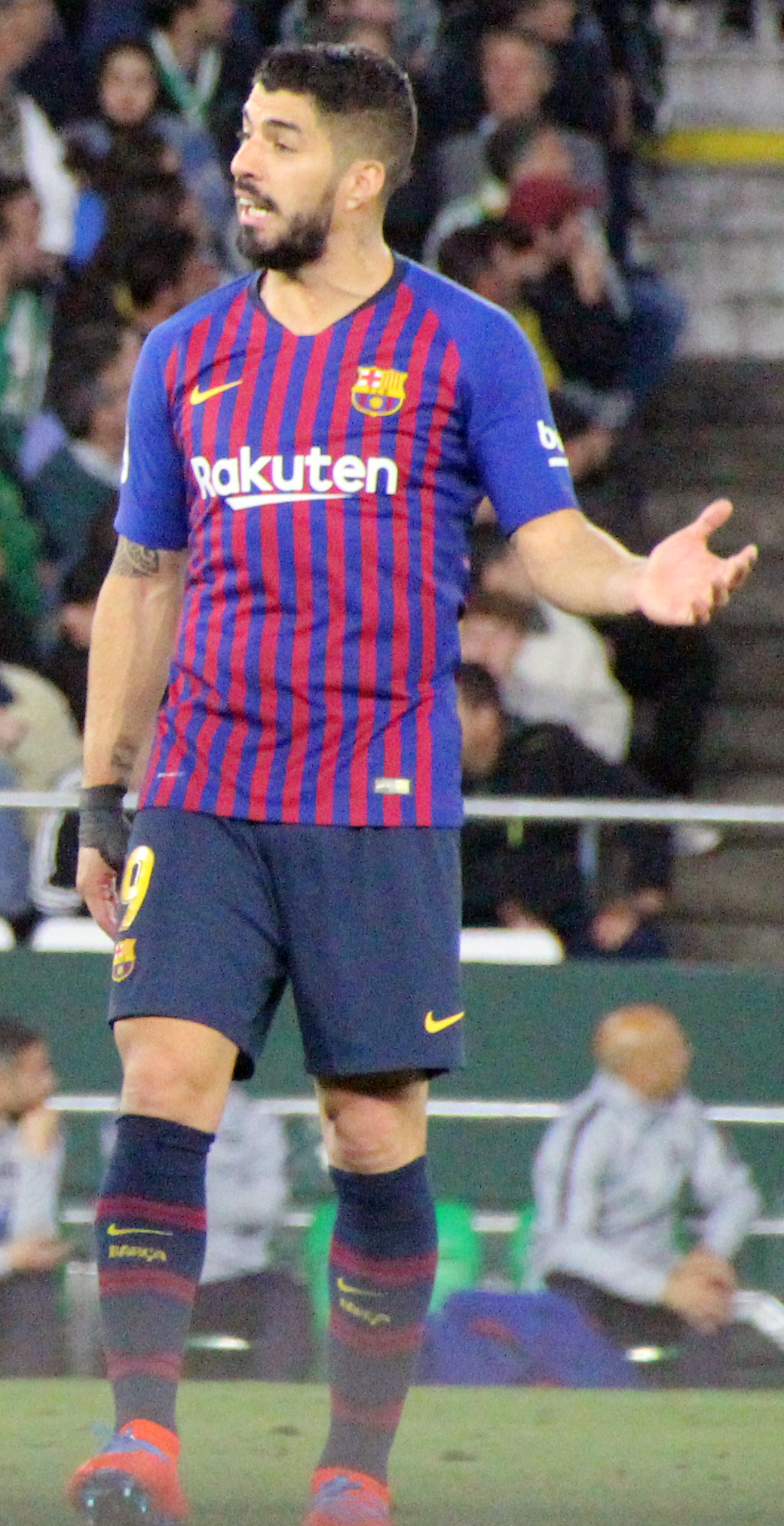
Luis Suárez became the first player to score four times in two consecutive games in the history of La Liga.

Key
^{4}	Player scored four goals
^{5}	Player scored five goals
^{6}	Player scored six goals
^{7}	Player scored seven goals
†	Player scored hat-trick as a substitute
	The home team

No.	Player	Nationality	For	Against	Result	Date	Ref.
1	Jaime Lazcano^{4}	Spain	Real Madrid	Europa	5–0	10 February 1929	
2	Manuel Cros^{4}	Spain	Europa	Arenas	5–2	17 February 1929	
3	Carmelo	Spain	Athletic Bilbao	Espanyol	9–0	17 February 1929	
4	Lafuente	Spain	Athletic Bilbao	Espanyol	9–0	17 February 1929	
5	Lafuente	Spain	Athletic Bilbao	Racing Santander	4–0	24 February 1929	
6	Josep Sastre	Spain	Barcelona	Europa	5–2	24 March 1929	
7	Ángel Arocha	Spain	Barcelona	Racing Santander	5–1	28 April 1929	
8	Carles Bestit^{4}	Spain	Europa	Real Madrid	5–2	28 April 1929	
9	Ricardo Gallart	Spain	Espanyol	Athletic Bilbao	4–1	5 May 1929	
10	Santiago Urtizberea	Spain	Real Unión	Arenas	7–1	12 May 1929	
11	Cosme^{4}	Spain	Atlético Madrid	Europa	5–4	9 June 1929	
12	Luis Marín	Spain	Atlético Madrid	Espanyol	7–1	23 June 1929	
13	Luis Marín	Spain	Atlético Madrid	Europa	5–3	1 December 1929	
14	Cholín	Spain	Real Sociedad	Racing Santander	7–0	8 December 1929	
15	Ángel Arocha	Spain	Barcelona	Racing Santander	5–0	22 December 1929	
16	Chirri II	Spain	Athletic Bilbao	Real Unión	5–2	5 January 1930	
17	Santiago Urtizberea^{4}	Spain	Real Unión	Racing Santander	6–3	12 January 1930	
18	Ricardo Gallart	Spain	Espanyol	Barcelona	4–0	19 January 1930	
19	Juanito	Spain	Arenas	Real Unión	7–2	2 February 1930	
20	Saro	Spain	Arenas	Real Unión	7–2	2 February 1930	
21	Guillermo Gorostiza	Spain	Athletic Bilbao	Real Sociedad	7–1	16 February 1930	
22	José Iraragorri	Spain	Athletic Bilbao	Real Sociedad	7–1	16 February 1930	
23	Gaspar Rubio	Spain	Real Madrid	Atlético Madrid	4–1	16 February 1930	
24	Manuel Alfaro Romero	Spain	Real Unión	Atlético Madrid	8–2	23 February 1930	
25	José Iraragorri^{4}	Spain	Athletic Bilbao	Espanyol	6–0	23 February 1930	
26	Luis Regueiro	Spain	Real Unión	Atlético Madrid	8–2	23 February 1930	
27	Guillermo Gorostiza^{4}	Spain	Athletic Bilbao	Arenas	5–2	2 March 1930	
28	Javier Rivero	Spain	Arenas	Real Madrid	5–1	23 March 1930	
29	Bestit II	Spain	Europa	Real Unión	4–3	30 March 1930	
30	Jaime Lazcano	Spain	Real Madrid	Barcelona	5–1	30 March 1930	
31	Fernando Diego	Spain	Barcelona	Athletic Bilbao	6–3	7 December 1930	
32	Manuel Olivares	Spain	Alavés	Arenas	3–2	14 December 1930	
33	Manuel Olivares	Spain	Alavés	Espanyol	4–1	21 December 1930	
34	Bata	Spain	Athletic Bilbao	Alavés	7–1	28 December 1930	
35	Edelmiro	Spain	Espanyol	Arenas	5–0	28 December 1930	
36	Santiago Urtizberea	Spain	Real Unión	Espanyol	6–1	4 January 1931	
37	Ángel Arocha	Spain	Barcelona	Espanyol	6–2	11 January 1931	
38	Bata^{7}	Spain	Athletic Bilbao	Barcelona	12–1	8 February 1931	
39	Telete	Spain	Racing Santander	Espanyol	4–0	15 February 1931	
40	Ángel Arocha	Spain	Barcelona	Real Sociedad	5–1	22 February 1931	
41	Bata^{4}	Spain	Athletic Bilbao	Racing Santander	7–1	22 February 1931	
42	Bata	Spain	Athletic Bilbao	Europa	4–1	8 March 1931	
43	Óscar	Spain	Racing Santander	Real Sociedad	7–4	8 March 1931	
44	Ángel Arocha	Spain	Barcelona	Espanyol	4–4	17 March 1931	
45	Carles Bestit	Spain	Barcelona	Real Unión	5–3	22 March 1931	
46	Telete	Spain	Racing Santander	Alavés	4–0	22 March 1931	
47	Guillermo Gorostiza	Spain	Athletic Bilbao	Espanyol	4–0	29 March 1931	
48	Juan Ramón	Spain	Barcelona	Real Madrid	3–1	5 April 1931	
49	Luis Jesús Navarro	Spain	Valencia	Real Unión	5–1	29 November 1931	
50	Paco Bienzobas	Spain	Real Sociedad	Valencia	7–1	27 December 1931	
51	Juan Ramón	Spain	Barcelona	Alavés	6–0	10 January 1932	
52	Telete^{4}	Spain	Racing Santander	Real Sociedad	5–1	17 January 1932	
53	Bata	Spain	Athletic Bilbao	Arenas	4–1	24 January 1932	
54	Cholín	Spain	Real Sociedad	Arenas	7–0	7 February 1932	
55	Edelmiro	Spain	Espanyol	Racing Santander	6–1	16 February 1932	
56	Francisco Goenechea	Spain	Racing Santander	Barcelona	3–2	6 March 1932	
57	José Iraragorri	Spain	Athletic Bilbao	Valencia	7–2	6 March 1932	
58	Cholín	Spain	Real Sociedad	Athletic Bilbao	3–2	13 March 1932	
59	Francisco Iriondo	Spain	Arenas	Real Unión	5–0	13 March 1932	
60	Josep Samitier	Spain	Barcelona	Alavés	3–1	13 March 1932	
61	Ángel	Spain	Arenas	Valencia	4–1	3 April 1932	
62	José Iraragorri^{5}	Spain	Athletic Bilbao	Real Betis	9–1	27 November 1932	
63	Cándido Urretavizcaya	Spain	Alavés	Racing Santander	8–2	27 November 1932	
64	Manuel Olivares	Spain	Real Madrid	Real Sociedad	6–2	4 December 1932	
65	Manuel Olivares	Spain	Real Madrid	Real Betis	4–1	18 December 1932	
66	Ubaldo Redó	Spain	Espanyol	Alavés	3–1	8 January 1933	
67	Óscar	Spain	Racing Santander	Real Sociedad	7–1	17 January 1933	
68	Joan Costa Font	Spain	Valencia	Alavés	5–2	22 January 1933	
69	Telete	Spain	Racing Santander	Alavés	9–0	29 January 1933	
70	Guillermo Gorostiza	Spain	Athletic Bilbao	Racing Santander	9–5	5 February 1933	
71	José Pérez	Spain	Racing Santander	Athletic Bilbao	5–9	5 February 1933	
72	Victorio Unamuno^{4}	Spain	Athletic Bilbao	Racing Santander	9–5	5 February 1933	
73	Francisco Iriondo	Spain	Arenas	Barcelona	5–1	19 February 1933	
74	Picolín Reig	Spain	Valencia	Racing Santander	6–2	19 February 1933	
75	Santiago Urtizberea	Spain	Real Sociedad	Espanyol	6–1	26 February 1933	
76	Salvador Pueyo	Spain	Espanyol	Valencia	5–2	5 March 1933	
77	Enrique Larrinaga	Spain	Racing Santander	Real Madrid	4–2	12 March 1933	
78	Bata	Spain	Athletic Bilbao	Valencia	8–2	19 March 1933	
79	Luis Regueiro	Spain	Real Madrid	Arenas	8–2	19 March 1933	
80	Victorio Unamuno^{5}	Spain	Athletic Bilbao	Valencia	8–2	19 March 1933	
81	Santiago Urtizberea^{5}	Spain	Real Sociedad	Racing Santander	8–0	19 March 1933	
82	Isidro Lángara	Spain	Oviedo	Barcelona	7–3	5 November 1933	
83	Luis María Uribe	Spain	Athletic Bilbao	Real Betis	5–0	12 November 1933	
84	Francisco Iriondo	Spain	Espanyol	Racing Santander	5–0	18 November 1933	
85	Isidro Lángara	Spain	Oviedo	Espanyol	3–1	10 December 1933	
86	Severiano Goiburu	Spain	Barcelona	Racing Santander	6–3	17 December 1933	
87	Guillermo Gorostiza	Spain	Athletic Bilbao	Barcelona	6–1	24 December 1933	
88	José Iraragorri	Spain	Athletic Bilbao	Barcelona	6–1	24 December 1933	
89	Francisco Iriondo	Spain	Espanyol	Arenas	6–2	24 December 1933	
90	Eugenio	Spain	Real Madrid	Espanyol	3–2	31 December 1933	
91	Tolete	Spain	Real Sociedad	Espanyol	3–3	7 January 1934	
92	Isidro Lángara	Spain	Oviedo	Racing Santander	3–1	14 January 1934	
93	Bata	Spain	Athletic Bilbao	Arenas	9–0	4 February 1934	
94	José Iraragorri^{4}	Spain	Athletic Bilbao	Arenas	9–0	4 February 1934	
95	Francisco Iriondo^{4}	Spain	Espanyol	Oviedo	5–2	11 February 1934	
96	Isidro Lángara	Spain	Oviedo	Valencia	7–0	22 February 1934	
97	Campanal I	Spain	Sevilla	Espanyol	5–1	16 December 1934	
98	José María Arteche	Spain	Racing Santander	Athletic Bilbao	6–0	30 December 1934	
99	Pablo Pombo	Spain	Racing Santander	Athletic Bilbao	6–0	30 December 1934	
100	Fernando Sañudo^{4}	Spain	Real Madrid	Espanyol	7–2	30 December 1934	
101	Crisant Bosch	Spain	Espanyol	Arenas	4–0	13 January 1935	
102	Campanal I	Spain	Sevilla	Barcelona	3–1	20 January 1935	
103	José Mandaluniz	Spain	Athletic Bilbao	Arenas	8–0	20 January 1935	
104	Julio Elícegui	Spain	Atlético Madrid	Oviedo	3–3	27 January 1935	
105	Francisco Iriondo	Spain	Espanyol	Real Sociedad	4–1	27 January 1935	
106	Isidro Lángara	Spain	Oviedo	Atlético Madrid	3–3	27 January 1935	
107	Bata	Spain	Athletic Bilbao	Real Sociedad	7–0	3 February 1935	
108	Isidro Lángara	Spain	Oviedo	Valencia	4–0	3 February 1935	
109	Jaime Lazcano	Spain	Real Madrid	Barcelona	8–2	3 February 1935	
110	Fernando Sañudo^{4}	Spain	Real Madrid	Barcelona	8–2	3 February 1935	
111	Isidro Lángara^{4}	Spain	Oviedo	Espanyol	8–3	10 February 1935	
112	José Iraragorri	Spain	Athletic Bilbao	Racing Santander	4–2	17 March 1935	
113	Herrerita	Spain	Oviedo	Real Sociedad	5–3	7 April 1935	
114	Manuel Palencia	Spain	Sevilla	Arenas	4–0	14 April 1935	
115	Joan Costa Font	Spain	Valencia	Oviedo	4–4	21 April 1935	
116	Julio Elícegui	Spain	Atlético Madrid	Espanyol	5–2	21 April 1935	
117	Martí Ventolrà^{4}	Spain	Barcelona	Real Madrid	5–0	21 April 1935	
118	Campanal I^{4}	Spain	Sevilla	Real Sociedad	7–2	28 April 1935	
119	José Iraragorri	Spain	Athletic Bilbao	Atlético Madrid	5–2	28 April 1935	
120	Fernando Sañudo^{4}	Spain	Real Madrid	Arenas	6–1	28 April 1935	
121	Unamuno	Spain	Real Betis	Racing Santander	5–0	28 April 1935	
122	Manuel Guijarro	Spain	Valencia	Sevilla	5–0	10 November 1935	
123	Paquirri	Spain	Real Betis	Osasuna	5–1	10 November 1935	
124	Bata^{5}	Spain	Athletic Bilbao	Real Betis	7–0	17 November 1935	
125	Vilmos Kelemen	Hungary	Real Madrid	Espanyol	6–0	17 November 1935	
126	Milucho	Spain	Racing Santander	Valencia	6–2	17 November 1935	
127	Paquirri	Spain	Real Betis	Oviedo	3–2	24 November 1935	
128	Isidro Lángara	Spain	Oviedo	Racing Santander	6–2	1 December 1935	
129	Fernando Sañudo	Spain	Real Madrid	Valencia	4–1	1 December 1935	
130	Isidro Lángara	Spain	Oviedo	Hércules	5–2	8 December 1935	
131	Fernando Sañudo	Spain	Real Madrid	Osasuna	6–2	5 January 1936	
132	Fernando Sañudo	Spain	Real Madrid	Real Betis	5–1	26 January 1936	
133	Josep Escolà	Spain	Barcelona	Atlético Madrid	3–0	9 February 1936	
134	Julián Vergara^{5}	Spain	Osasuna	Espanyol	6–1	16 February 1936	
135	Isidro Lángara	Spain	Oviedo	Racing Santander	4–2	1 March 1936	
136	Vilmos Kelemen	Hungary	Real Madrid	Racing Santander	3–4	15 March 1936	
137	Isidro Lángara	Spain	Oviedo	Espanyol	5–1	22 March 1936	
138	Enrique Fernández Viola	Uruguay	Barcelona	Osasuna	5–0	29 March 1936	
139	Luis Regueiro	Spain	Real Madrid	Osasuna	4–1	5 April 1936	
140	Isidro Lángara^{4}	Spain	Oviedo	Valencia	4–3	19 April 1936	
141	Enrique Rubio	Spain	Atlético Madrid	Athletic Bilbao	3–1	3 December 1939	
142	Campanal I	Spain	Sevilla	Racing Santander	8–2	17 December 1939	
143	José Vilanova	Spain	Hércules	Celta Vigo	6–1	17 December 1939	
144	Francisco Gárate	Spain	Athletic Bilbao	Barcelona	7–5	14 January 1940	
145	Juli Gonzalvo^{4}	Spain	Espanyol	Celta Vigo	4–1	14 January 1940	
146	Pedro Pascual	Argentina	Barcelona	Athletic Bilbao	5–7	14 January 1940	
147	Agustín Jarabo	Spain	Celta Vigo	Zaragoza	5–1	18 February 1940	
148	Hipólito Inchaurregui	Spain	Valencia	Real Betis	4–0	18 February 1940	
149	Agustín Jarabo	Spain	Celta Vigo	Hércules	4–0	3 March 1940	
150	Paco Campos	Spain	Atlético Madrid	Zaragoza	5–1	3 March 1940	
151	Vicente Martínez Català^{4}	Spain	Espanyol	Real Madrid	5–4	3 March 1940	
152	Antonio Chas	Spain	Racing Santander	Celta Vigo	6–2	24 March 1940	
153	Mundo	Spain	Valencia	Espanyol	3–2	7 April 1940	
154	Unamuno	Spain	Athletic Bilbao	Celta Vigo	4–1	7 April 1940	
155	Guillermo Gorostiza	Spain	Athletic Bilbao	Valencia	4–3	21 April 1940	
156	Gabriel Jorge	Spain	Espanyol	Real Betis	5–0	21 April 1940	
157	Campanal I^{5}	Spain	Sevilla	Barcelona	11–1	29 September 1940	
158	Paco Campos^{4}	Spain	Atlético Madrid	Celta Vigo	5–4	29 September 1940	
159	Miguel López Torrontegui	Spain	Sevilla	Barcelona	11–1	29 September 1940	
160	Agustín Jarabo	Spain	Celta Vigo	Espanyol	7–1	6 October 1940	
161	Manuel Alday	Spain	Real Madrid	Hércules	5–3	6 October 1940	
162	del Pino	Spain	Celta Vigo	Espanyol	7–1	6 October 1940	
163	Campanal I	Spain	Sevilla	Valencia	10–3	13 October 1940	
164	José López Martínez^{4}	Spain	Sevilla	Valencia	10–3	13 October 1940	
165	Pruden	Spain	Atlético Madrid	Real Madrid	3–1	13 October 1940	
166	Pruden^{4}	Spain	Atlético Madrid	Athletic Bilbao	5–0	20 October 1940	
167	Raimundo^{4}	Spain	Sevilla	Hércules	8–3	10 November 1940	
168	Francisco Gárate	Spain	Athletic Bilbao	Murcia	6–1	17 November 1940	
169	Guillermo Gorostiza	Spain	Valencia	Oviedo	5–1	17 November 1940	
170	Francisco Roig Zamora	Spain	Celta Vigo	Valencia	6–2	24 November 1940	
171	José Vilanova	Spain	Zaragoza	Oviedo	4–5	24 November 1940	
172	Emili Huguet	Spain	Murcia	Valencia	3–3	1 December 1940	
173	Manuel Alday	Spain	Real Madrid	Valencia	6–1	8 December 1940	
174	Manuel Alday	Spain	Real Madrid	Zaragoza	6–0	15 December 1940	
175	Pruden^{4}	Spain	Atlético Madrid	Murcia	6–0	22 December 1940	
176	Mundo	Spain	Valencia	Hércules	6–0	19 January 1941	
177	José Luis Panizo	Spain	Athletic Bilbao	Espanyol	6–2	19 January 1941	
178	Severiano Uria	Spain	Murcia	Celta Vigo	3–0	19 January 1941	
179	Chus Alonso	Spain	Real Madrid	Sevilla	4–5	9 February 1941	
180	Pruden	Spain	Atlético Madrid	Hércules	7–1	9 February 1941	
181	Antón	Spain	Oviedo	Hércules	6–0	23 February 1941	
182	Mundo	Spain	Valencia	Murcia	5–2	23 February 1941	
183	Raimundo^{5}	Spain	Sevilla	Oviedo	10–0	28 September 1941	
184	Marcial Arbiza	Spain	Real Madrid	Granada	5–2	5 October 1941	
185	Mundo^{4}	Spain	Valencia	Real Sociedad	6–0	5 October 1941	
186	José Pina	Spain	Hércules	Deportivo La Coruña	4–2	5 October 1941	
187	Antonio Fernández de Andrés	Spain	Atlético Madrid	Real Sociedad	4–1	12 October 1941	
188	Basilio	Spain	Castellón	Hércules	4–0	26 October 1941	
189	Paco Campos	Spain	Atlético Madrid	Granada	3–0	26 October 1941	
190	Campanal I	Spain	Sevilla	Valencia	4–1	9 November 1941	
191	Manuel Alday^{4}	Spain	Real Madrid	Castellón	9–1	16 November 1941	
192	Juan del Pino^{4}	Spain	Celta Vigo	Hércules	4–1	16 November 1941	
193	Gabriel Jorge	Spain	Espanyol	Atlético Madrid	5–0	16 November 1941	
194	Mundo	Spain	Valencia	Oviedo	5–2	16 November 1941	
195	Unamuno	Spain	Athletic Bilbao	Barcelona	6–3	16 November 1941	
196	César Rodríguez	Spain	Granada	Hércules	7–2	14 December 1941	
197	Mariano Martín	Spain	Barcelona	Oviedo	6–3	14 December 1941	
198	Mundo^{4}	Spain	Valencia	Celta Vigo	7–3	14 December 1941	
199	Manuel Alday	Spain	Real Madrid	Valencia	5–3	21 December 1941	
200	Juan del Pino	Spain	Celta Vigo	Real Sociedad	6–1	21 December 1941	
201	Manuel Alday	Spain	Real Madrid	Real Sociedad	6–4	4 January 1942	
202	Ignacio Bidegain	Spain	Real Sociedad	Real Madrid	4–6	4 January 1942	
203	Miguel López Torrontegui	Spain	Sevilla	Castellón	4–1	11 January 1942	
204	Telmo Zarra^{4}	Spain	Athletic Bilbao	Celta Vigo	10–0	11 January 1942	
205	Campanal I^{5}	Spain	Sevilla	Espanyol	6–0	25 January 1942	
206	Mundo	Spain	Valencia	Sevilla	8–1	15 February 1942	
207	Telmo Zarra	Spain	Athletic Bilbao	Atlético Madrid	6–0	15 February 1942	
208	Mariano Martín^{4}	Spain	Barcelona	Atlético Madrid	5–1	1 March 1942	
209	César Rodríguez^{6}	Spain	Granada	Castellón	7–3	22 March 1942	
210	Antonio Chas	Spain	Espanyol	Real Sociedad	8–0	29 March 1942	
211	Eduardo Olivas	Spain	Espanyol	Real Sociedad	8–0	29 March 1942	
212	Mundo^{4}	Spain	Valencia	Oviedo	7–0	25 October 1942	
213	José Valle	Spain	Barcelona	Celta Vigo	8–0	8 November 1942	
214	Antón	Spain	Oviedo	Granada	4–2	15 November 1942	
215	Josep Juncosa	Spain	Espanyol	Real Madrid	4–2	15 November 1942	
216	Mundo	Spain	Valencia	Sevilla	4–2	22 November 1942	
217	Paco Campos	Spain	Atlético Madrid	Castellón	5–1	13 December 1942	
218	Mariano Martín	Spain	Barcelona	Granada	5–2	27 December 1942	
219	Pepillo	Spain	Sevilla	Zaragoza	4–3	10 January 1943	
220	Manuel Alday	Spain	Real Madrid	Deportivo La Coruña	4–3	17 January 1943	
221	Rafael Berrocal	Spain	Sevilla	Real Betis	5–0	17 January 1943	
222	Josep Juncosa	Spain	Espanyol	Atlético Madrid	4–2	17 January 1943	
223	Francisco Roig Zamora	Spain	Celta Vigo	Athletic Bilbao	4–1	24 January 1943	
224	Agustín Jarabo	Spain	Celta Vigo	Granada	8–3	7 February 1943	
225	Francisco Roig Zamora	Spain	Celta Vigo	Granada	8–3	7 February 1943	
226	Mariano Martín	Spain	Barcelona	Castellón	7–1	14 February 1943	
227	Telmo Zarra^{5}	Spain	Athletic Bilbao	Oviedo	8–1	14 February 1943	
228	Basilio	Spain	Castellón	Deportivo La Coruña	3–1	21 February 1943	
229	Manuel Alday^{5}	Spain	Real Madrid	Espanyol	7–0	28 February 1943	
230	Mundo^{6}	Spain	Valencia	Real Betis	8–3	28 February 1943	
231	Rafael Berrocal	Spain	Sevilla	Valencia	3–1	7 March 1943	
232	Mariano Martín	Spain	Barcelona	Oviedo	6–2	14 March 1943	
233	Pepillo	Spain	Sevilla	Granada	3–4	14 March 1943	
234	Francisco Roig Zamora	Spain	Celta Vigo	Castellón	5–0	21 March 1943	
235	Telmo Zarra	Spain	Athletic Bilbao	Barcelona	5–2	21 March 1943	
236	Juan Arza	Spain	Sevilla	Sabadell	5–2	26 September 1943	
237	Guillermo Gorostiza	Spain	Valencia	Real Sociedad	4–2	26 September 1943	
238	Martín	Spain	Atlético Madrid	Celta Vigo	7–0	26 September 1943	
239	Sabino Barinaga	Spain	Real Madrid	Sevilla	3–5	3 October 1943	
240	Campanal I	Spain	Sevilla	Real Madrid	5–3	3 October 1943	
241	José Luis Duque	Spain	Athletic Bilbao	Deportivo La Coruña	3–1	3 October 1943	
242	Mariano Martín	Spain	Barcelona	Valencia	4–3	3 October 1943	
243	Esteban Echevarría^{5}	Spain	Oviedo	Espanyol	6–1	17 October 1943	
244	Mariano Martín	Spain	Barcelona	Deportivo La Coruña	3–3	17 October 1943	
245	Juan Arza	Spain	Sevilla	Deportivo La Coruña	3–0	7 November 1943	
246	Mariano Martín^{4}	Spain	Barcelona	Granada	7–2	7 November 1943	
247	Antón	Spain	Oviedo	Sabadell	9–2	14 November 1943	
248	Esteban Echevarría^{4}	Spain	Oviedo	Sabadell	9–2	14 November 1943	
249	Sabino Barinaga	Spain	Real Madrid	Sabadell	3–1	28 November 1943	
250	Paco Campos	Spain	Atlético Madrid	Granada	3–2	5 December 1943	
251	Guillermo Gorostiza	Spain	Valencia	Oviedo	5–3	5 December 1943	
252	Juan Vidal	Spain	Espanyol	Sevilla	3–2	12 December 1943	
253	Mariano Martín^{4}	Spain	Barcelona	Sabadell	5–0	19 December 1943	
254	Esteban Echevarría	Spain	Oviedo	Sevilla	5–1	2 January 1944	
255	Paco Campos	Spain	Atlético Madrid	Valencia	4–2	13 February 1944	
256	César Rodríguez	Spain	Barcelona	Atlético Madrid	4–5	20 February 1944	
257	Mundo	Spain	Valencia	Celta Vigo	5–1	12 March 1944	
258	Juan del Pino	Spain	Sabadell	Athletic Bilbao	5–1	19 March 1944	
259	Gabriel Jorge^{4}	Spain	Espanyol	Deportivo La Coruña	7–0	19 March 1944	
260	Raimundo	Spain	Sevilla	Celta Vigo	5–1	2 April 1944	
261	Juan del Pino^{4}	Spain	Sabadell	Deportivo La Coruña	4–0	9 April 1944	
262	José Luis Duque	Spain	Athletic Bilbao	Valencia	4–5	9 April 1944	
263	Mundo	Spain	Valencia	Athletic Bilbao	5–4	9 April 1944	
264	Luis Safont	Spain	Granada	Celta Vigo	5–2	9 April 1944	
265	Emilín^{4}	Spain	Oviedo	Real Madrid	4–0	24 September 1944	
266	Paco Campos	Spain	Atlético Madrid	Castellón	4–0	8 October 1944	
267	Juan Acedo	Spain	Granada	Oviedo	5–1	15 October 1944	
268	Juan Arza	Spain	Sevilla	Sporting Gijón	6–0	22 October 1944	
269	Juan Ricart^{4}	Spain	Castellón	Sabadell	8–0	5 November 1944	
270	Telmo Zarra	Spain	Athletic Bilbao	Deportivo La Coruña	5–2	5 November 1944	
271	Antonio Gracia	Spain	Sabadell	Murcia	4–0	19 November 1944	
272	José Luis Duque	Spain	Espanyol	Granada	7–2	26 November 1944	
273	Vicente Morera	Spain	Murcia	Oviedo	5–1	26 November 1944	
274	Mundo	Spain	Valencia	Granada	4–0	10 December 1944	
275	Antonio Chas^{4}	Spain	Oviedo	Barcelona	6–0	14 January 1945	
276	José Campos	Spain	Sevilla	Murcia	4–0	4 February 1945	
277	Juan Nicola^{4}	Spain	Granada	Sabadell	5–0	25 February 1945	
278	César Rodríguez	Spain	Barcelona	Sporting Gijón	5–2	18 March 1945	
279	Chus Alonso	Spain	Real Madrid	Granada	6–2	8 April 1945	
280	Mundo	Spain	Valencia	Sevilla	4–0	8 April 1945	
281	Antonio Chas	Spain	Oviedo	Murcia	3–2	15 April 1945	
282	Sabino Barinaga	Spain	Real Madrid	Murcia	5–3	13 May 1945	
283	Pío	Spain	Sporting Gijón	Oviedo	6–0	13 May 1945	
284	Herrerita	Spain	Oviedo	Atlético Madrid	3–3	7 October 1945	
285	Óscar	Spain	Atlético Madrid	Oviedo	3–3	7 October 1945	
286	Ángel Cabido^{4}	Spain	Oviedo	Athletic Bilbao	4–2	14 October 1945	
287	Pahiño	Spain	Celta Vigo	Alcoyano	6–1	21 October 1945	
288	José Campos^{4}	Spain	Sevilla	Alcoyano	4–2	4 November 1945	
289	Mundo	Spain	Valencia	Celta Vigo	5–1	18 November 1945	
290	José Villar González	Spain	Alcoyano	Sporting Gijón	4–1	18 November 1945	
291	Telmo Zarra^{4}	Spain	Athletic Bilbao	Castellón	7–1	18 November 1945	
292	Ángel Cabido	Spain	Oviedo	Hércules	3–0	25 November 1945	
293	César Rodríguez	Spain	Barcelona	Celta Vigo	5–1	9 December 1945	
294	Telmo Zarra	Spain	Athletic Bilbao	Espanyol	5–1	9 December 1945	
295	Mundo	Spain	Valencia	Espanyol	3–2	16 December 1945	
296	Telmo Zarra^{4}	Spain	Athletic Bilbao	Murcia	6–1	20 January 1946	
297	Ángel Calvo	Spain	Espanyol	Atlético Madrid	4–3	10 March 1946	
298	Mundo^{4}	Spain	Valencia	Alcoyano	6–1	31 March 1946	
299	Pruden	Spain	Real Madrid	Celta Vigo	6–0	31 March 1946	
300	Pruden	Spain	Real Madrid	Murcia	5–0	29 September 1946	
301	Ángel Calvo	Spain	Espanyol	Castellón	5–0	6 October 1946	
302	José Luis Panizo	Spain	Athletic Bilbao	Sevilla	5–0	3 November 1946	
303	Pruden	Spain	Real Madrid	Sporting Gijón	4–0	3 November 1946	
304	Paco Campos	Spain	Atlético Madrid	Oviedo	5–2	10 November 1946	
305	Isidro Lángara	Spain	Oviedo	Castellón	3–3	15 December 1946	
306	Francisco Méndez	Spain	Sporting Gijón	Valencia	4–1	15 December 1946	
307	Telmo Zarra	Spain	Athletic Bilbao	Deportivo La Coruña	6–0	15 December 1946	
308	Telmo Zarra^{5}	Spain	Athletic Bilbao	Castellón	6–0	1 January 1947	
309	Telmo Zarra	Spain	Athletic Bilbao	Real Madrid	6–3	12 January 1947	
310	José Ignacio de la Torre	Spain	Deportivo La Coruña	Castellón	8–1	19 January 1947	
311	Telmo Zarra^{4}	Spain	Athletic Bilbao	Sporting Gijón	6–2	19 January 1947	
312	Pruden	Spain	Real Madrid	Castellón	7–4	2 February 1947	
313	Josep Escolà^{4}	Spain	Barcelona	Espanyol	5–0	16 March 1947	
314	José Campos	Spain	Sevilla	Sporting Gijón	5–2	30 March 1947	
315	Adrián Escudero	Spain	Atlético Madrid	Espanyol	8–3	30 March 1947	
316	Vicente Morera	Spain	Valencia	Real Madrid	4–2	6 April 1947	
317	Amadeo	Spain	Valencia	Sporting Gijón	6–0	13 April 1947	
318	Telmo Zarra	Spain	Athletic Bilbao	Deportivo La Coruña	3–3	13 April 1947	
319	Antonio Vidal	Spain	Atlético Madrid	Espanyol	5–2	5 October 1947	
320	Epi	Spain	Valencia	Sabadell	4–1	2 November 1947	
321	Francisco Peralta	Spain	Gimnàstic	Sporting Gijón	5–0	2 November 1947	
322	Estanislau Basora	Spain	Barcelona	Sporting Gijón	4–0	16 November 1947	
323	Juan Araujo	Spain	Sevilla	Real Sociedad	5–0	7 December 1947	
324	Esteban Echevarría^{5}	Spain	Oviedo	Real Madrid	7–1	21 December 1947	
325	Silvestre Igoa^{4}	Spain	Valencia	Celta Vigo	7–1	21 December 1947	
326	Juan Rodríguez Gallardo	Spain	Real Madrid	Sabadell	4–0	18 January 1948	
327	Pahiño	Spain	Celta Vigo	Gimnàstic	5–0	25 January 1948	
328	Josep Juncosa	Spain	Atlético Madrid	Gimnàstic	5–2	22 February 1948	
329	César Rodríguez	Spain	Barcelona	Sevilla	6–0	29 February 1948	
330	Telmo Zarra	Spain	Athletic Bilbao	Alcoyano	6–1	7 March 1948	
331	César Rodríguez^{4}	Spain	Barcelona	Espanyol	5–1	28 March 1948	
332	David Panadès	Spain	Gimnàstic	Athletic Bilbao	7–1	28 March 1948	
333	Francisco Peralta	Spain	Gimnàstic	Athletic Bilbao	7–1	28 March 1948	
334	Antonio Vidal	Spain	Atlético Madrid	Real Sociedad	4–3	4 April 1948	
335	Josep Juncosa	Spain	Atlético Madrid	Sporting Gijón	7–2	11 April 1948	
336	Francisco Peralta^{4}	Spain	Gimnàstic	Alcoyano	4–3	11 April 1948	
337	César Rodríguez^{4}	Spain	Barcelona	Oviedo	5–2	12 September 1948	
338	José Luis Panizo	Spain	Athletic Bilbao	Valladolid	7–2	12 September 1948	
339	Telmo Zarra	Spain	Athletic Bilbao	Valladolid	7–2	12 September 1948	
340	Rafael Franco	Argentina	Deportivo La Coruña	Sabadell	5–2	19 September 1948	
341	Mariano Uceda^{4}	Spain	Sevilla	Athletic Bilbao	6–0	24 October 1948	
342	Adrián Escudero^{4}	Spain	Atlético Madrid	Oviedo	6–0	26 September 1948	
343	Herrerita^{4}	Spain	Oviedo	Athletic Bilbao	6–3	3 October 1948	
344	Mundo	Spain	Valencia	Gimnàstic	7–0	10 October 1948	
345	José Montalvo	Spain	Real Madrid	Sevilla	5–1	24 October 1948	
346	César Rodríguez	Spain	Barcelona	Valencia	4–3	31 October 1948	
347	Vicente Seguí	Spain	Valencia	Barcelona	3–4	31 October 1948	
348	Pablo Olmedo^{4}	Spain	Real Madrid	Celta Vigo	6–0	14 November 1948	
349	Ángel Cabido	Spain	Oviedo	Sabadell	5–4	5 December 1948	
350	Rafael Franco^{4}	Argentina	Deportivo La Coruña	Alcoyano	6–1	12 December 1948	
351	Pahiño	Spain	Real Madrid	Sabadell	5–1	12 December 1948	
352	Telmo Zarra	Spain	Athletic Bilbao	Sevilla	4–0	9 January 1949	
353	Vicente Seguí	Spain	Valencia	Deportivo La Coruña	7–1	23 January 1949	
354	Santiago Vázquez	Spain	Gimnàstic	Valencia	6–1	30 January 1949	
355	Paseiro	Spain	Deportivo La Coruña	Espanyol	3–0	27 February 1949	
356	Josep Canal	Spain	Barcelona	Valladolid	6–0	3 April 1949	
357	Rafael Mújica	Spain	Atlético Madrid	Athletic Bilbao	3–1	10 April 1949	
358	Antonio Chao	Spain	Deportivo La Coruña	Gimnàstic	4–1	17 April 1949	
359	Alfonso Navarro^{5}	Spain	Barcelona	Gimnàstic	10–1	11 September 1949	
360	César Rodríguez	Spain	Barcelona	Gimnàstic	10–1	11 September 1949	
361	Larbi Benbarek	Morocco	Atlético Madrid	Espanyol	5–2	25 September 1949	
362	Josep Seguer^{4}	Spain	Barcelona	Sevilla	7–0	25 September 1949	
363	Miguel Cabrera	Spain	Real Madrid	Oviedo	6–2	2 October 1949	
364	Rafael Mújica	Spain	Atlético Madrid	Gimnàstic	5–1	9 October 1949	
365	Hermidita^{4}	Spain	Celta Vigo	Gimnàstic	10–1	23 October 1949	
366	José Caeiro	Spain	Real Sociedad	Oviedo	7–0	30 October 1949	
367	Rafael Franco	Argentina	Deportivo La Coruña	Atlético Madrid	3–1	30 October 1949	
368	Henry Carlsson	Sweden	Atlético Madrid	Barcelona	4–1	6 November 1949	
369	Hermidita	Spain	Celta Vigo	Sevilla	4–2	6 November 1949	
370	Juan Araujo	Spain	Sevilla	Athletic Bilbao	3–2	20 November 1949	
371	Manuel Torres	Spain	CD Málaga	Real Sociedad	5–2	20 November 1949	
372	Juan Araujo^{4}	Spain	Sevilla	Gimnàstic	9–0	4 December 1949	
373	Ángel Oñoro	Spain	Sevilla	Gimnàstic	9–0	4 December 1949	
374	Vicente Seguí^{4}	Spain	Valencia	Atlético Madrid	6–0	4 December 1949	
375	Telmo Zarra	Spain	Athletic Bilbao	Real Sociedad	5–2	18 December 1949	
376	Rafael Iriondo	Spain	Athletic Bilbao	Atlético Madrid	6–6	29 January 1950	
377	Vicente Seguí	Spain	Valencia	Sevilla	5–0	12 February 1950	
378	Manuel Torres	Spain	CD Málaga	Gimnàstic	5–1	12 February 1950	
379	César Rodríguez^{4}	Spain	Barcelona	Oviedo	5–0	19 February 1950	
380	José Luis Panizo	Spain	Athletic Bilbao	Real Madrid	6–2	12 March 1950	
381	Juan Araujo	Spain	Sevilla	Athletic Bilbao	5–3	16 April 1950	
382	Pahiño^{4}	Spain	Real Madrid	Gimnàstic	5–1	16 April 1950	
383	Silvestre Igoa	Spain	Valencia	Atlético Madrid	4–4	23 April 1950	
384	César Rodríguez^{4}	Spain	Barcelona	Real Sociedad	8–2	10 September 1950	
385	Quiliano Gago	Spain	Valencia	CD Málaga	3–1	10 September 1950	
386	Pahiño	Spain	Real Madrid	Espanyol	6–2	10 September 1950	
387	Silvestre Igoa	Spain	Real Sociedad	Real Madrid	6–2	17 September 1950	
388	Manuel Torres^{4}	Spain	CD Málaga	Lleida	9–0	17 September 1950	
389	Telmo Zarra	Spain	Athletic Bilbao	Murcia	6–3	17 September 1950	
390	José Campos	Spain	Sevilla	Racing Santander	4–0	24 September 1950	
391	Rafael Grau^{4}	Spain	Espanyol	Alcoyano	5–3	1 October 1950	
392	Rafael Iriondo	Spain	Athletic Bilbao	Celta Vigo	9–4	8 October 1950	
393	Josep Juncosa^{4}	Spain	Atlético Madrid	Racing Santander	9–1	8 October 1950	
394	Jesús Narro^{4}	Spain	Real Madrid	Lleida	6–1	8 October 1950	
395	Venancio	Spain	Athletic Bilbao	Celta Vigo	9–4	8 October 1950	
396	Jesús Narro	Spain	Real Madrid	Alcoyano	7–0	15 October 1950	
397	Pahiño	Spain	Real Madrid	Alcoyano	7–0	15 October 1950	
398	Julio Corcuera	Argentina	Deportivo La Coruña	Lleida	10–1	5 November 1950	
399	Ignacio Bidegain	Spain	Lleida	Sevilla	4–5	12 November 1950	
400	Epi	Spain	Real Sociedad	Murcia	7–0	12 November 1950	
401	Juan Araujo^{4}	Spain	Sevilla	Alcoyano	7–1	19 November 1950	
402	Gerardo Coque	Spain	Valladolid	Real Sociedad	3–2	19 November 1950	
403	Telmo Zarra^{6}	Spain	Athletic Bilbao	Lleida	10–0	19 November 1950	
404	Larbi Benbarek	Morocco	Atlético Madrid	Lleida	4–3	26 November 1950	
405	Adrián Escudero	Spain	Atlético Madrid	Alcoyano	5–1	3 December 1950	
406	José Caeiro	Spain	Real Sociedad	CD Málaga	4–1	10 December 1950	
407	Hermidita	Spain	Celta Vigo	Valencia	5–1	17 December 1950	
408	Javier Marcet	Spain	Espanyol	Real Madrid	7–1	31 December 1950	
409	Pahiño^{4}	Spain	Real Madrid	Real Sociedad	7–2	7 January 1951	
410	Telmo Zarra	Spain	Athletic Bilbao	Murcia	5–1	7 January 1951	
411	Julián Arcas	Spain	Espanyol	Lleida	8–0	14 January 1951	
412	Jesús Narro	Spain	Real Madrid	Barcelona	4–1	14 January 1951	
413	Josep Juncosa	Spain	Atlético Madrid	Valladolid	7–0	21 January 1951	
414	Miguel Muñoz^{5}	Spain	Real Madrid	Lleida	7–0	30 January 1951	
415	Mohamed Mahjoub	Morocco	Racing Santander	Valladolid	4–1	25 February 1951	
416	Mundo	Spain	Alcoyano	Lleida	6–2	4 March 1951	
417	Telmo Zarra^{5}	Spain	Athletic Bilbao	Real Sociedad	7–1	4 March 1951	
418	Manuel Badenes	Spain	Valencia	Sevilla	4–0	11 March 1951	
419	Roque Olsen	Argentina	Real Madrid	Murcia	6–0	25 March 1951	
420	José María Pérez	Spain	Real Sociedad	Celta Vigo	5–1	8 April 1951	
421	Juan Ayala	Spain	Sevilla	Celta Vigo	3–1	9 September 1951	
422	Pahiño	Spain	Real Madrid	Las Palmas	4–1	9 September 1951	
423	Lolo	Spain	Valladolid	Deportivo La Coruña	5–0	16 September 1951	
424	Luis Olcina	Spain	Valladolid	Real Sociedad	4–1	23 September 1951	
425	José Luis Panizo^{4}	Spain	Athletic Bilbao	Zaragoza	10–1	23 September 1951	
426	José Palacios Herrera^{4}	Spain	Sevilla	Las Palmas	5–0	30 September 1951	
427	Manuel Badenes^{4}	Spain	Valencia	Celta Vigo	7–2	21 October 1951	
428	José Luis Pérez-Payá	Spain	Atlético Madrid	Racing Santander	7–2	21 October 1951	
429	Lahcen Chicha	Morocco	Atlético Tetuán	Espanyol	3–3	28 October 1951	
430	Juan Mas Molina	Spain	Valencia	Atlético Tetuán	5–1	18 November 1951	
431	László Kubala^{5}	Hungary	Barcelona	Celta Vigo	6–1	18 November 1951	
432	László Kubala	Hungary	Barcelona	Sevilla	5–3	2 December 1951	
433	Tini	Spain	Athletic Bilbao	Real Sociedad	4–1	16 December 1951	
434	Domingo Méndez	Spain	Atlético Madrid	Sporting Gijón	7–3	6 January 1952	
435	Hermidita^{5}	Spain	Celta Vigo	Atlético Tetuán	7–0	13 January 1952	
436	Pahiño^{4}	Spain	Real Madrid	Espanyol	6–1	13 January 1952	
437	Julián García-Nieto^{4}	Spain	Atlético Tetuán	Racing Santander	5–1	20 January 1952	
438	László Kubala^{7}	Hungary	Barcelona	Sporting Gijón	9–0	10 February 1952	
439	Venancio^{4}	Spain	Athletic Bilbao	Las Palmas	7–0	17 February 1952	
440	Juan Araujo^{4}	Spain	Sevilla	Valencia	6–1	24 February 1952	
441	César Rodríguez	Spain	Barcelona	Real Madrid	4–2	2 March 1952	
442	Tini	Spain	Athletic Bilbao	Deportivo La Coruña	4–1	9 March 1952	
443	László Kubala	Hungary	Barcelona	Racing Santander	7–1	16 March 1952	
444	Josep Mauri	Spain	Espanyol	Valladolid	3–0	23 March 1952	
445	Adolfo Atienza	Spain	Celta Vigo	Deportivo La Coruña	6–1	6 April 1952	
446	César Rodríguez	Spain	Barcelona	Las Palmas	7–0	6 April 1952	
447	Juan Arza	Spain	Sevilla	Real Madrid	4–1	13 April 1952	
448	Manuel Torres	Spain	Las Palmas	Zaragoza	4–2	13 April 1952	
449	Félix Marcaida	Spain	Athletic Bilbao	Celta Vigo	5–0	5 October 1952	
450	Josep Mauri	Spain	Espanyol	Sporting Gijón	4–0	5 October 1952	
451	Silvestre Igoa	Spain	Real Sociedad	CD Málaga	4–2	19 October 1952	
452	Julián Arcas	Spain	Espanyol	Athletic Bilbao	6–2	26 October 1952	
453	Javier Marcet	Spain	Espanyol	Athletic Bilbao	6–2	26 October 1952	
454	César Rodríguez	Spain	Barcelona	Zaragoza	5–1	26 October 1952	
455	Adrián Escudero	Spain	Atlético Madrid	Celta Vigo	4–1	2 November 1952	
456	Antonio Morro^{4}	Spain	Valladolid	Deportivo La Coruña	4–1	16 November 1952	
457	Agustín Gaínza	Spain	Athletic Bilbao	Deportivo La Coruña	8–2	23 November 1952	
458	Silvestre Igoa	Spain	Real Sociedad	Celta Vigo	7–3	14 December 1952	
459	Gerardo Coque	Spain	Valladolid	Atlético Madrid	4–4	21 December 1952	
460	Telmo Zarra	Spain	Athletic Bilbao	CD Málaga	6–1	21 December 1952	
461	Manuel Doménech^{4}	Spain	Sevilla	Sporting Gijón	7–1	11 January 1953	
462	Mandi Fernández	Spain	Oviedo	CD Málaga	6–1	11 January 1953	
463	Oswaldo García	Argentina	Deportivo La Coruña	Atlético Madrid	5–1	11 January 1953	
464	Manuel Badenes	Spain	Valencia	Real Sociedad	5–2	18 January 1953	
465	Silvestre Igoa	Spain	Real Sociedad	Deportivo La Coruña	6–1	8 February 1953	
466	Tomás Hernández^{4}	Spain	Barcelona	Atlético Madrid	6–1	8 February 1953	
467	Silvestre Igoa	Spain	Real Sociedad	CD Málaga	4–1	22 February 1953	
468	Liz	Spain	Sevilla	Deportivo La Coruña	6–2	22 February 1953	
469	Tomás Hernández	Spain	Barcelona	Zaragoza	8–0	1 March 1953	
470	Julián Arcas	Spain	Espanyol	Deportivo La Coruña	7–1	8 March 1953	
471	Telmo Zarra	Spain	Athletic Bilbao	Valladolid	4–2	15 March 1953	
472	Miguel Royo	Spain	Deportivo La Coruña	Oviedo	3–3	19 April 1953	
473	Sará	Argentina	Oviedo	Deportivo La Coruña	3–3	19 April 1953	
474	Lorenzo Pérez	Spain	Sevilla	Celta Vigo	4–2	26 April 1953	
475	Pasieguito	Spain	Valencia	Racing Santander	7–1	26 April 1953	
476	Antonio Cruellas	Spain	Espanyol	Osasuna	3–2	20 September 1953	
477	László Kubala	Hungary	Barcelona	Jaén	6–2	20 September 1953	
478	Eneko Arieta	Spain	Athletic Bilbao	Racing Santander	5–1	11 October 1953	
479	Faas Wilkes	Netherlands	Valencia	Atlético Madrid	4–1	25 October 1953	
480	Alfredo Di Stéfano	Argentina	Real Madrid	Atlético Madrid	4–3	1 November 1953	
481	Antonio Morro	Spain	Valladolid	Valencia	3–2	22 November 1953	
482	Julián Arcas	Spain	Espanyol	Celta Vigo	4–0	29 November 1953	
483	Lorenzo Pérez	Spain	Sevilla	Real Sociedad	5–0	27 December 1953	
484	Luis Molowny	Spain	Real Madrid	Espanyol	4–3	27 December 1953	
485	Justo Tejada^{4}	Spain	Barcelona	Real Sociedad	6–0	10 January 1954	
486	László Kubala	Hungary	Barcelona	Valladolid	4–1	24 January 1954	
487	José Luis Ortiz	Spain	Sporting Gijón	Valencia	5–2	28 March 1954	
488	Alfredo Di Stéfano	Argentina	Real Madrid	Sporting Gijón	4–0	4 April 1954	
489	Francisco León	Spain	Racing Santander	Real Sociedad	4–2	4 April 1954	
490	Josep Vila	Spain	Osasuna	Sporting Gijón	4–3	11 April 1954	
491	Alfredo Di Stéfano	Argentina	Real Madrid	Valencia	4–0	18 April 1954	
492	Ángel María Arregui	Spain	Jaén	Deportivo La Coruña	4–0	25 April 1954	
493	Juan Arza	Spain	Sevilla	Valladolid	5–2	26 September 1954	
494	Alfredo Di Stéfano	Argentina	Real Madrid	Las Palmas	7–0	26 September 1954	
495	Juan Araujo^{4}	Spain	Sevilla	Real Sociedad	5–2	3 October 1954	
496	Faas Wilkes^{4}	Netherlands	Valencia	Racing Santander	8–1	3 October 1954	
497	Pahiño^{4}	Spain	Deportivo La Coruña	Celta Vigo	4–2	10 October 1954	
498	Justo Tejada	Spain	Barcelona	Atlético Madrid	4–0	10 October 1954	
499	Enrique Buqué	Spain	Valencia	Barcelona	4–1	17 October 1954	
500	José Luis Artetxe^{4}	Spain	Athletic Bilbao	CD Málaga	6–1	24 October 1954	
501	Manuel Badenes^{4}	Spain	Valencia	Hércules	8–2	14 November 1954	
502	Manuel Badenes	Spain	Valencia	Alavés	6–1	28 November 1954	
503	José Luis Pérez-Payá	Spain	Real Madrid	Deportivo La Coruña	5–1	5 December 1954	
504	Primi	Spain	Alavés	Las Palmas	4–1	5 December 1954	
505	Eduardo Manchón	Spain	Barcelona	Espanyol	4–2	9 January 1955	
506	László Kubala	Hungary	Barcelona	Celta Vigo	5–2	16 January 1955	
507	Juan Arza^{4}	Spain	Sevilla	Hércules	6–1	23 January 1955	
508	Eneko Arieta^{4}	Spain	Athletic Bilbao	Las Palmas	9–2	30 January 1955	
509	Héctor Rial	Argentina	Real Madrid	Sevilla	3–1	30 January 1955	
510	Agustín	Spain	Atlético Madrid	Valladolid	5–4	6 February 1955	
511	Manuel Badenes^{4}	Spain	Valencia	Deportivo La Coruña	4–0	6 February 1955	
512	László Kubala	Hungary	Barcelona	CD Málaga	5–0	13 February 1955	
513	Alfredo Di Stéfano^{4}	Argentina	Real Madrid	Espanyol	5–1	27 February 1955	
514	Manuel Badenes	Spain	Valencia	Sevilla	3–1	6 March 1955	
515	Julián Arcas	Spain	Espanyol	Valladolid	4–3	11 September 1955	
516	Eneko Arieta	Spain	Athletic Bilbao	Sevilla	6–1	11 September 1955	
517	Adrián Escudero	Spain	Atlético Madrid	Hércules	9–0	11 September 1955	
518	José Gallardo^{4}	Spain	Murcia	Deportivo La Coruña	5–4	11 September 1955	
519	Francisco Molina	Chile	Atlético Madrid	Hércules	9–0	11 September 1955	
520	Pahiño	Spain	Deportivo La Coruña	Murcia	4–5	11 September 1955	
521	Faas Wilkes	Netherlands	Valencia	Celta Vigo	6–0	18 September 1955	
522	Adrián Escudero	Spain	Atlético Madrid	Alavés	8–1	25 September 1955	
523	Pepillo	Spain	Sevilla	Cultural Leonesa	4–0	25 September 1955	
524	Miguel Echaniz	Spain	Alavés	Murcia	5–2	2 October 1955	
525	Paseiro	Spain	Espanyol	Celta Vigo	6–1	9 October 1955	
526	Manuel Badenes	Spain	Valencia	Murcia	4–1	30 October 1955	
527	Ángel Paz	Spain	Real Sociedad	Espanyol	5–0	6 November 1955	
528	Manuel Badenes	Spain	Valencia	Hércules	4–1	13 November 1955	
529	Félix Marcaida	Spain	Athletic Bilbao	Murcia	7–1	13 November 1955	
530	Francisco Molina	Chile	Atlético Madrid	Murcia	4–0	1 January 1956	
531	Juan Arza	Spain	Sevilla	Celta Vigo	7–0	8 January 1956	
532	Adolfo Atienza	Spain	Las Palmas	Deportivo La Coruña	5–0	22 January 1956	
533	Adolfo Atienza	Spain	Las Palmas	Hércules	5–0	5 February 1956	
534	Adrián Escudero	Spain	Atlético Madrid	Valladolid	3–1	5 February 1956	
535	Alfredo Di Stéfano^{4}	Argentina	Real Madrid	Espanyol	7–1	9 February 1956	
536	László Kubala	Hungary	Barcelona	Hércules	6–4	12 February 1956	
537	Raúl	Spain	Cultural Leonesa	Celta Vigo	4–1	19 February 1956	
538	Ramón Marsal	Spain	Real Madrid	Murcia	7–1	26 February 1956	
539	Faas Wilkes	Netherlands	Valencia	Deportivo La Coruña	4–0	11 March 1956	
540	Joaquín Peiró	Spain	Atlético Madrid	Cultural Leonesa	4–2	25 March 1956	
541	Alberto Pla	Spain	Valencia	Valladolid	5–1	8 April 1956	
542	Alfredo Di Stéfano	Argentina	Real Madrid	Las Palmas	6–0	15 April 1956	
543	Julián Arcas^{4}	Spain	Espanyol	Alavés	6–0	22 April 1956	
544	Alfredo Di Stéfano	Argentina	Real Madrid	Condal	6–0	9 September 1956	
545	Luis Suárez^{4}	Spain	Barcelona	Atlético Madrid	7–3	23 September 1956	
546	Justo Tejada	Spain	Barcelona	Atlético Madrid	7–3	23 September 1956	
547	Rafa Delgado	Spain	Atlético Madrid	Real Sociedad	3–0	30 September 1956	
548	Pedro Bazán	Spain	Deportivo La Coruña	Real Sociedad	4–0	14 October 1956	
549	Joaquín Murillo	Spain	Valladolid	Zaragoza	4–1	14 October 1956	
550	Pedro María Laguardia	Spain	Real Sociedad	Athletic Bilbao	3–4	21 October 1956	
551	Sabino	Spain	Osasuna	Espanyol	5–0	28 October 1956	
552	Mauri	Spain	Athletic Bilbao	Zaragoza	5–0	11 November 1956	
553	Joaquín Peiró	Spain	Atlético Madrid	Espanyol	8–1	11 November 1956	
554	Pepillo	Spain	Sevilla	Atlético Madrid	5–1	18 November 1956	
555	Joaquín Murillo	Spain	Valladolid	Las Palmas	6–2	25 November 1956	
556	Alfredo Di Stéfano	Argentina	Real Madrid	Zaragoza	3–3	16 December 1956	
557	Joaquín Peiró	Spain	Atlético Madrid	Deportivo La Coruña	6–0	30 December 1956	
558	Joseíto	Spain	Real Madrid	Espanyol	7–2	6 January 1957	
559	László Kubala	Hungary	Barcelona	Deportivo La Coruña	6–1	27 January 1957	
560	Joaquim Basora	Spain	Condal	Sevilla	5–1	2 February 1957	
561	Ignacio Uribe	Spain	Athletic Bilbao	Real Madrid	4–2	24 February 1957	
562	Estanislau Basora^{4}	Spain	Barcelona	Zaragoza	4–2	17 March 1957	
563	Juan Arza	Spain	Sevilla	Jaén	3–0	24 March 1957	
564	Alfredo Di Stéfano^{4}	Argentina	Real Madrid	Las Palmas	5–1	7 April 1957	
565	Alfredo Di Stéfano	Argentina	Real Madrid	Celta Vigo	4–1	21 April 1957	
566	Alfredo Di Stéfano	Argentina	Real Madrid	Sevilla	6–0	29 September 1957	
567	Mauro Rodríguez	Spain	Celta Vigo	Las Palmas	6–1	6 October 1957	
568	Agustín Sánchez	Spain	Atlético Madrid	Las Palmas	9–0	20 October 1957	
569	Josep Mauri	Spain	Granada	Valladolid	4–0	20 October 1957	
570	Miguel González	Spain	Atlético Madrid	Las Palmas	9–0	20 October 1957	
571	Pablo Olmedo	Spain	Celta Vigo	Valencia	3–2	17 November 1957	
572	Mauro Rodríguez	Spain	Celta Vigo	Barcelona	4–0	1 December 1957	
573	Manuel Badenes^{4}	Spain	Valladolid	Sporting Gijón	7–3	15 December 1957	
574	José Luis Ortiz	Spain	Sporting Gijón	Zaragoza	4–1	12 January 1958	
575	Joaquín Peiró	Spain	Atlético Madrid	Valladolid	7–0	19 January 1958	
576	Óscar Coll	Argentina	Espanyol	Atlético Madrid	4–1	26 January 1958	
577	José Glaría	Spain	Osasuna	Valladolid	5–0	2 February 1958	
578	Lolo Gómez	Spain	Sevilla	Valladolid	4–2	16 February 1958	
579	José Luis Artetxe	Spain	Athletic Bilbao	Barcelona	4–1	2 March 1958	
580	Evaristo	Brazil	Barcelona	Valladolid	7–1	9 March 1958	
581	José Rodríguez	Spain	Valladolid	Jaén	3–1	23 March 1958	
582	Manuel Badenes	Spain	Valladolid	Real Madrid	3–5	29 March 1958	
583	Alfredo Di Stéfano	Argentina	Real Madrid	Valladolid	5–3	29 March 1958	
584	Ramón Marsal	Spain	Real Madrid	Espanyol	4–2	6 April 1958	
585	Alfredo Di Stéfano	Argentina	Real Madrid	Celta Vigo	5–0	20 April 1958	
586	Evaristo	Brazil	Barcelona	Zaragoza	5–1	20 April 1958	
587	Ferenc Puskás	Hungary	Real Madrid	Sporting Gijón	5–1	21 September 1958	
588	Alfredo Di Stéfano	Argentina	Real Madrid	Celta Vigo	4–2	28 September 1958	
589	Alfredo Di Stéfano	Argentina	Real Madrid	Osasuna	8–0	5 October 1958	
590	Vavá	Brazil	Atlético Madrid	Sevilla	5–0	12 October 1958	
591	Félix Iribarren	Spain	Real Sociedad	Las Palmas	6–2	19 October 1958	
592	Evaristo	Brazil	Barcelona	Real Madrid	4–0	26 October 1958	
593	Jordi Vila^{4}	Spain	Real Betis	Zaragoza	7–0	16 November 1958	
594	Manuel Olalla	Spain	Granada	Sporting Gijón	6–0	7 December 1958	
595	Vavá^{5}	Brazil	Atlético Madrid	Zaragoza	7–1	7 December 1958	
596	Armando Merodio	Spain	Athletic Bilbao	Sporting Gijón	9–0	28 December 1958	
597	Ignacio Uribe	Spain	Athletic Bilbao	Sporting Gijón	9–0	28 December 1958	
598	Alfredo Di Stéfano	Argentina	Real Madrid	Las Palmas	10–1	4 January 1959	
599	Mauri	Spain	Athletic Bilbao	Celta Vigo	9–0	4 January 1959	
600	Ferenc Puskás	Hungary	Real Madrid	Las Palmas	10–1	4 January 1959	
601	Armando Merodio^{5}	Spain	Athletic Bilbao	Osasuna	8–1	11 January 1959	
602	Antoniet	Spain	Sevilla	Zaragoza	3–1	18 January 1959	
603	Eneko Arieta	Spain	Athletic Bilbao	Real Betis	7–0	18 January 1959	
604	Justo Tejada	Spain	Barcelona	Sevilla	4–0	25 January 1959	
605	Jordi Vila	Spain	Real Betis	Sporting Gijón	5–3	8 February 1959	
606	Ferenc Puskás	Hungary	Real Madrid	Oviedo	4–0	8 March 1959	
607	Antoniet	Spain	Sevilla	Las Palmas	3–4	15 March 1959	
608	Macario	Spain	Las Palmas	Sevilla	4–3	15 March 1959	
609	Ferenc Puskás	Hungary	Real Madrid	Granada	3–0	29 March 1959	
610	Alfredo Di Stéfano	Argentina	Real Madrid	Sevilla	8–0	5 April 1959	
611	José María Maguregui	Spain	Athletic Bilbao	Real Madrid	4–1	12 April 1959	
612	Duca	Brazil	Zaragoza	Valencia	6–1	19 April 1959	
613	Eulogio Martínez	Paraguay	Barcelona	Oviedo	7–1	19 April 1959	
614	Joaquín Murillo	Spain	Zaragoza	Granada	6–2	20 September 1959	
615	Evaristo	Brazil	Barcelona	Osasuna	6–0	27 September 1959	
616	Félix Marcaida	Spain	Athletic Bilbao	Real Sociedad	4–0	4 October 1959	
617	Gilberto Navarro	Spain	Sevilla	Valladolid	5–0	18 October 1959	
618	Luis Suárez	Spain	Barcelona	Las Palmas	8–0	25 October 1959	
619	José María Gallastegui	Spain	Real Sociedad	Oviedo	6–2	8 November 1959	
620	Joaquín Peiró^{4}	Spain	Atlético Madrid	Real Betis	4–1	8 November 1959	
621	Paz	Spain	Real Sociedad	Valladolid	4–2	29 November 1959	
622	Gonzalo Beitia	Spain	Athletic Bilbao	Atlético Madrid	5–2	13 December 1959	
623	Sabino Andonegui	Spain	Osasuna	Las Palmas	4–2	20 December 1959	
624	Óscar Coll	Argentina	Espanyol	Granada	3–0	3 January 1960	
625	José Grande Garrido	Spain	Valladolid	Osasuna	5–1	24 January 1960	
626	Pepillo^{5}	Spain	Real Madrid	Elche	11–2	7 February 1960	
627	Ferenc Puskás^{4}	Hungary	Real Madrid	Elche	11–2	7 February 1960	
628	Eulogio Martínez^{5}	Paraguay	Barcelona	Las Palmas	8–0	14 February 1960	
629	Joaquín Murillo	Spain	Zaragoza	Las Palmas	6–2	21 February 1960	
630	Vavá	Brazil	Atlético Madrid	Real Betis	6–1	28 February 1960	
631	Martí Vergés	Spain	Barcelona	Granada	5–4	28 February 1960	
632	Pepillo	Spain	Real Madrid	Real Sociedad	4–0	10 April 1960	
633	José Carlos Diéguez	Argentina	Sevilla	Elche	4–1	17 April 1960	
634	Antonio Camps	Spain	Espanyol	Valencia	3–0	11 September 1960	
635	José Antonio Zaldúa	Spain	Valladolid	Real Betis	5–1	2 October 1960	
636	Evaristo	Brazil	Barcelona	Real Sociedad	6–2	16 October 1960	
637	Yanko Daucik	Czech Republic	Real Betis	Real Sociedad	5–1	6 November 1960	
638	Antoniet	Spain	Sevilla	Oviedo	3–2	13 November 1960	
639	Ferenc Puskás	Hungary	Real Madrid	Zaragoza	5–1	13 November 1960	
640	Francisco Sampedro	Spain	Racing Santander	Elche	5–1	20 November 1960	
641	Luis del Sol	Spain	Real Madrid	Oviedo	7–0	27 November 1960	
642	Evaristo	Brazil	Barcelona	Mallorca	4–2	18 December 1960	
643	Polo	Spain	Atlético Madrid	Zaragoza	4–0	15 January 1961	
644	Ferenc Puskás^{4}	Hungary	Real Madrid	Elche	8–0	22 January 1961	
645	Joaquín Murillo	Spain	Zaragoza	Elche	7–2	29 January 1961	
646	Joaquín Peiró	Spain	Atlético Madrid	Valladolid	4–2	12 February 1961	
647	Alfredo Di Stéfano^{4}	Argentina	Real Madrid	Granada	5–0	19 February 1961	
648	Alfredo Rojas	Argentina	Real Betis	Elche	7–1	5 March 1961	
649	László Kubala^{4}	Hungary	Barcelona	Granada	8–2	19 March 1961	
650	Joaquín Murillo	Spain	Zaragoza	Valladolid	5–1	23 April 1961	
651	Ferenc Puskás	Hungary	Real Madrid	Real Betis	4–0	23 April 1961	
652	Luis Aragonés	Spain	Oviedo	Barcelona	5–3	30 April 1961	
653	Juan Seminario^{4}	Peru	Zaragoza	Racing Santander	6–1	17 September 1961	
654	Evaristo	Brazil	Barcelona	Athletic Bilbao	4–2	24 September 1961	
655	Juan Ángel Romero^{4}	Paraguay	Elche	Espanyol	6–2	8 October 1961	
656	Ramón Alberto Villaverde	Uruguay	Barcelona	Real Betis	6–1	15 October 1961	
657	Juan Seminario	Peru	Zaragoza	Oviedo	5–1	29 October 1961	
658	Evaristo	Brazil	Barcelona	Atlético Madrid	5–1	5 November 1961	
659	Joaquín Murillo	Spain	Zaragoza	Osasuna	6–3	5 November 1961	
660	Waldo Machado^{4}	Brazil	Valencia	Barcelona	6–2	19 November 1961	
661	Sándor Kocsis	Hungary	Barcelona	Real Sociedad	5–0	30 December 1961	
662	Ferenc Puskás	Hungary	Real Madrid	Racing Santander	6–0	31 December 1961	
663	Sabino	Spain	Osasuna	Valencia	5–2	14 January 1962	
664	Juan Manuel Villa	Spain	Real Sociedad	Real Betis	6–0	4 February 1962	
665	Jorge Roberto Larraz	Argentina	Tenerife	Zaragoza	4–2	18 February 1962	
666	Joaquín Murillo	Spain	Zaragoza	Real Betis	4–0	4 March 1962	
667	Koldo Aguirre	Spain	Athletic Bilbao	Atlético Madrid	5–1	18 March 1962	
668	Juan Seminario	Peru	Zaragoza	Espanyol	3–0	18 March 1962	
669	Ferenc Puskás	Hungary	Real Madrid	Real Betis	5–2	16 September 1962	
670	Francisco Sampedro	Spain	Mallorca	CD Málaga	5–0	16 September 1962	
671	Joaquín Peiró^{4}	Spain	Atlético Madrid	Sevilla	4–2	22 September 1962	
672	Alfredo Di Stéfano	Argentina	Real Madrid	Elche	6–1	14 October 1962	
673	Pepillo	Spain	Mallorca	Atlético Madrid	4–0	28 October 1962	
674	Juan Ángel Romero	Paraguay	Elche	CD Málaga	6–4	28 October 1962	
675	Juan Seminario^{4}	Peru	Zaragoza	Mallorca	6–1	4 November 1962	
676	José Luis Pérez	Spain	Oviedo	CD Málaga	3–1	11 November 1962	
677	José Luis Pérez	Spain	Oviedo	Atlético Madrid	3–0	6 January 1963	
678	Emilio Morollón^{4}	Spain	Valladolid	Córdoba	6–0	13 January 1963	
679	Chapela	Spain	Osasuna	Valladolid	4–1	20 January 1963	
680	Ferenc Puskás	Hungary	Real Madrid	Barcelona	5–1	27 January 1963	
681	Cesáreo Rivera	Spain	Sevilla	Zaragoza	3–1	27 January 1963	
682	Roberto Gil	Spain	Valencia	Mallorca	7–2	10 February 1963	
683	José Antonio Zaldúa	Spain	Barcelona	Elche	4–0	17 February 1963	
684	Chuzo	Spain	Atlético Madrid	Mallorca	6–1	24 February 1963	
685	Waldo Machado	Brazil	Valencia	Oviedo	5–0	7 April 1963	
686	Vicente Guillot	Spain	Valencia	Levante	5–3	28 September 1963	
687	Alfredo Di Stéfano	Argentina	Real Madrid	Córdoba	5–2	5 October 1963	
688	Waldo Machado	Brazil	Valencia	Oviedo	4–1	6 October 1963	
689	José Antonio Zaldúa	Spain	Barcelona	Sevilla	6–0	3 November 1963	
690	Cayetano Ré	Paraguay	Barcelona	Levante	5–4	10 November 1963	
691	Ferenc Puskás	Hungary	Real Madrid	Barcelona	4–0	15 December 1963	
692	Juan Manuel Villa	Spain	Zaragoza	Valencia	5–1	5 January 1964	
693	Waldo Machado	Brazil	Valencia	Sevilla	4–1	19 January 1964	
694	Jesús María Pereda	Spain	Barcelona	Levante	6–2	1 March 1964	
695	Alfredo Di Stéfano	Argentina	Real Madrid	Murcia	4–1	15 March 1964	
696	Cayetano Ré	Paraguay	Barcelona	Espanyol	5–0	19 April 1964	
697	Ramón Grosso	Spain	Real Madrid	Córdoba	6–1	27 September 1964	
698	Jesús María Pereda^{4}	Spain	Barcelona	Murcia	8–1	4 October 1964	
699	Luis Aragonés	Spain	Atlético Madrid	Murcia	5–1	11 October 1964	
700	Vicente Navarro	Spain	Valencia	Elche	5–0	1 November 1964	
701	Amancio Amaro	Spain	Real Madrid	Barcelona	4–1	8 November 1964	
702	Enrique Silvestre	Spain	Murcia	Elche	4–0	20 December 1964	
703	Ramón Grosso	Spain	Real Madrid	Sevilla	4–0	27 December 1964	
704	Carlos Lapetra	Spain	Zaragoza	Deportivo La Coruña	4–1	3 January 1965	
705	Hilario Velasco	Spain	Sevilla	Oviedo	3–2	17 January 1965	
706	László Kaszás	Hungary	Espanyol	Zaragoza	4–2	7 February 1965	
707	Cayetano Ré	Paraguay	Barcelona	Sevilla	4–3	14 February 1965	
708	Canário	Brazil	Zaragoza	Elche	5–1	28 February 1965	
709	Vicente Guillot	Spain	Valencia	Oviedo	8–1	28 February 1965	
710	Waldo Machado^{4}	Brazil	Valencia	Oviedo	8–1	28 February 1965	
711	Andrés Molina	Spain	Mallorca	Las Palmas	4–1	12 September 1965	
712	Cayetano Ré	Paraguay	Barcelona	Real Betis	4–1	19 September 1965	
713	Eleuterio Santos	Spain	Zaragoza	Elche	6–1	26 September 1965	
714	Josep Antoni Noya	Spain	Sabadell	Real Betis	4–1	3 October 1965	
715	Koldo Aguirre	Spain	Athletic Bilbao	Espanyol	4–3	10 October 1965	
716	Luis Aragonés	Spain	Atlético Madrid	Real Betis	3–0	21 November 1965	
717	Juan Muñoz	Spain	Valencia	Real Betis	6–3	1 December 1965	
718	Luis Aragonés	Spain	Atlético Madrid	Sevilla	6–1	9 January 1966	
719	Juanín	Spain	Córdoba	Real Betis	3–3	20 February 1966	
720	Gilberto	Spain	Las Palmas	Córdoba	5–1	13 March 1966	
721	Danny Bergara	Uruguay	Mallorca	Athletic Bilbao	3–1	27 March 1966	
722	Miguel^{4}	Spain	Granada	Zaragoza	6–2	18 September 1966	
723	José María Lizarralde	Spain	Sevilla	Granada	3–1	25 September 1966	
724	Marcial Pina	Spain	Espanyol	Athletic Bilbao	3–1	9 October 1966	
725	Waldo Machado	Brazil	Valencia	Sabadell	6–1	9 October 1966	
726	Waldo Machado	Brazil	Valencia	Granada	3–0	13 November 1966	
727	José María Argoitia	Spain	Athletic Bilbao	Las Palmas	4–2	27 November 1966	
728	Pedro Zaballa^{4}	Spain	Barcelona	Deportivo La Coruña	5–0	18 December 1966	
729	José Antonio Urtiaga	Spain	Atlético Madrid	Hércules	7–2	1 January 1967	
730	Luis Aragonés	Spain	Atlético Madrid	Elche	5–2	5 March 1967	
731	Juan Carlos Lezcano	Paraguay	Elche	Sabadell	3–2	12 March 1967	
732	José María Argoitia	Spain	Athletic Bilbao	Las Palmas	3–0	26 March 1967	
733	Fidel Uriarte	Spain	Athletic Bilbao	Deportivo La Coruña	4–0	8 April 1967	
734	Antonio Illán	Spain	Elche	Zaragoza	5–1	16 April 1967	
735	Fidel Uriarte	Spain	Athletic Bilbao	Córdoba	3–0	9 September 1967	
736	Manuel Velázquez	Spain	Real Madrid	Real Sociedad	9–1	16 September 1967	
737	José Juan Gutiérrez	Spain	Las Palmas	Sevilla	4–1	24 September 1967	
738	José Miguel Arregui^{4}	Spain	Real Sociedad	Sabadell	6–0	10 December 1967	
739	Jesús María Arambarri	Spain	Real Sociedad	Elche	5–0	31 December 1967	
740	Fidel Uriarte^{5}	Spain	Athletic Bilbao	Real Betis	8–0	31 December 1967	
741	José Claramunt	Spain	Valencia	Pontevedra	6–2	18 February 1968	
742	Juan Ramón	Spain	Córdoba	Real Madrid	3–3	17 March 1968	
743	José Miguel Arregui^{4}	Spain	Real Sociedad	Córdoba	5–1	14 April 1968	
744	Juan Casco	Paraguay	Elche	Real Sociedad	5–0	21 April 1968	
745	Amancio Amaro	Spain	Real Madrid	Espanyol	3–1	15 September 1968	
746	José Miguel Arregui	Spain	Real Sociedad	Córdoba	5–1	24 November 1968	
747	José Claramunt	Spain	Valencia	Athletic Bilbao	5–1	24 November 1968	
748	José Eulogio Gárate	Spain	Atlético Madrid	Deportivo La Coruña	5–1	24 November 1968	
749	José Antonio Arzak	Spain	Real Sociedad	Granada	5–1	19 January 1969	
750	Sebastián Fleitas	Paraguay	CD Málaga	Sabadell	4–2	26 January 1969	
751	José Eulogio Gárate	Spain	Atlético Madrid	CD Málaga	4–1	16 February 1969	
752	Miguel Ángel Bustillo	Spain	Zaragoza	Granada	6–0	2 March 1969	
753	Gilberto	Spain	Las Palmas	Elche	5–1	13 September 1969	
754	Amancio Amaro	Spain	Real Madrid	Pontevedra	3–1	12 October 1969	
755	Justo Gilberto	Spain	Las Palmas	Mallorca	3–1	2 November 1969	
756	José Antonio Barrios	Spain	Granada	Mallorca	6–4	9 November 1969	
757	Abel	Spain	Celta Vigo	Elche	4–0	23 November 1969	
758	Felipe Ocampos	Paraguay	Zaragoza	Deportivo La Coruña	5–2	28 December 1969	
759	Amancio Amaro	Spain	Real Madrid	Las Palmas	5–0	11 January 1970	
760	Marco Antonio Boronat	Spain	Real Sociedad	Zaragoza	5–0	18 January 1970	
761	José Eulogio Gárate	Spain	Atlético Madrid	Celta Vigo	4–0	18 January 1970	
762	Félix Zubiaga	Spain	Athletic Bilbao	Real Madrid	5–0	1 February 1970	
763	Roldán	Spain	Pontevedra	Sabadell	4–1	15 March 1970	
764	Fernando Ansola	Spain	Valencia	Las Palmas	5–1	19 September 1970	
765	Vavá II^{4}	Spain	Elche	Sporting Gijón	5–0	27 September 1970	
766	José Eulogio Gárate	Spain	Atlético Madrid	Elche	4–0	7 February 1971	
767	Quini	Spain	Sporting Gijón	Sevilla	4–0	14 February 1971	
768	Teófilo Dueñas	Spain	Barcelona	Sevilla	5–2	7 March 1971	
769	José Eulogio Gárate	Spain	Atlético Madrid	Sabadell	5–0	11 September 1971	
770	Fernando Ansola	Spain	Real Sociedad	Espanyol	4–1	14 November 1971	
771	Enrique Porta	Spain	Granada	Sabadell	3–1	14 November 1971	
772	Juan María Amiano	Spain	Espanyol	Las Palmas	4–0	28 November 1971	
773	Julio Orozco^{4}	Spain	Atlético Madrid	Real Sociedad	5–0	5 December 1971	
774	Germán Dévora	Spain	Las Palmas	Sporting Gijón	5–1	11 December 1971	
775	Pirri	Spain	Real Madrid	Granada	4–2	12 December 1971	
776	Javier Irureta	Spain	Atlético Madrid	Real Betis	4–1	16 January 1972	
777	José Claramunt	Spain	Valencia	Córdoba	4–2	29 April 1972	
778	Pau	Spain	Zaragoza	Athletic Bilbao	3–2	5 November 1972	
779	Marianín	Spain	Oviedo	Athletic Bilbao	3–3	26 November 1972	
780	Óscar Valdez^{4}	Argentina	Valencia	Castellón	4–2	17 December 1972	
781	Angelín	Spain	Burgos	Athletic Bilbao	5–1	31 December 1972	
782	Enrique Porta	Spain	Granada	Oviedo	4–0	11 February 1973	
783	Manolo Jiménez	Spain	Celta Vigo	Oviedo	4–2	6 May 1973	
784	Quini	Spain	Sporting Gijón	Espanyol	3–0	9 December 1973	
785	Quino^{4}	Spain	Valencia	Sporting Gijón	6–1	27 January 1974	
786	Manolo Jiménez	Spain	Celta Vigo	CD Málaga	5–1	3 February 1974	
787	Marcial Pina	Spain	Barcelona	Sporting Gijón	4–2	7 April 1974	
788	Oscar Más	Argentina	Real Madrid	Celta Vigo	6–1	21 April 1974	
789	Hugo Sotil	Peru	Barcelona	Oviedo	6–2	21 April 1974	
790	Pirri	Spain	Real Madrid	Celta Vigo	3–3	3 November 1974	
791	José Ignacio Churruca	Spain	Sporting Gijón	Granada	5–1	29 December 1974	
792	José Eulogio Gárate	Spain	Atlético Madrid	Las Palmas	4–0	29 December 1974	
793	Rogelio Sosa	Spain	Real Betis	Hércules	3–0	5 January 1975	
794	Santillana	Spain	Real Madrid	Celta Vigo	4–1	15 March 1975	
795	Pau	Spain	Zaragoza	Real Madrid	6–1	30 April 1975	
796	Carlos	Spain	Athletic Bilbao	Zaragoza	4–0	11 May 1975	
797	Dani^{4}	Spain	Athletic Bilbao	Sevilla	4–1	13 September 1975	
798	Alfonso Alarcón	Spain	Oviedo	Sporting Gijón	3–1	28 September 1975	
799	Leivinha	Brazil	Atlético Madrid	Salamanca	4–1	28 September 1975	
800	Quini	Spain	Sporting Gijón	Las Palmas	3–0	26 October 1975	
801	Quini^{4}	Spain	Sporting Gijón	Espanyol	6–1	9 November 1975	
802	Carlos Diarte	Paraguay	Zaragoza	Salamanca	3–0	21 December 1975	
803	Carlos Diarte	Paraguay	Zaragoza	Barcelona	4–4	4 January 1976	
804	Quini	Spain	Sporting Gijón	Real Betis	5–0	22 February 1976	
805	Johnny Rep	Netherlands	Valencia	Sevilla	3–0	29 February 1976	
806	Rubén Ayala	Argentina	Atlético Madrid	Racing Santander	3–4	14 March 1976	
807	Leivinha	Brazil	Atlético Madrid	Oviedo	3–1	21 March 1976	
808	Attila Ladinszky	Hungary	Real Betis	Granada	4–1	28 March 1976	
809	Ricardo Muruzábal	Spain	Real Sociedad	Athletic Bilbao	3–2	28 March 1976	
810	Rafael Martínez	Spain	Sevilla	Oviedo	4–0	4 April 1976	
811	Ricardo Muruzábal	Spain	Real Sociedad	Racing Santander	3–2	2 May 1976	
812	Carlos Diarte	Paraguay	Valencia	Racing Santander	4–2	24 October 1976	
813	Eduardo Anzarda	Argentina	Real Betis	Espanyol	5–1	31 October 1976	
814	Manuel Clares	Spain	Barcelona	Burgos	3–0	14 November 1976	
815	Manuel Clares^{5}	Spain	Barcelona	Valencia	6–1	28 November 1976	
816	Pirri	Spain	Real Madrid	Elche	5–2	28 November 1976	
817	Carlos Morete	Argentina	Las Palmas	Racing Santander	4–1	4 December 1976	
818	Dani	Spain	Athletic Bilbao	Espanyol	5–2	12 December 1976	
819	Rafael Zuviría	Argentina	Racing Santander	Real Madrid	3–3	19 December 1976	
820	Quini II	Spain	Burgos	Elche	3–1	23 January 1977	
821	Quini II	Spain	Burgos	Las Palmas	4–1	6 February 1977	
822	Mario Finarolli	Argentina	Elche	Espanyol	4–1	27 February 1977	
823	Rafael Marañón	Spain	Espanyol	CD Málaga	5–1	10 April 1977	
824	Mario Finarolli	Argentina	Elche	CD Málaga	3–2	24 April 1977	
825	Orlando Giménez	Paraguay	Racing Santander	CD Málaga	3–2	15 May 1977	
826	Rubén Cano	Argentina	Atlético Madrid	Valencia	3–0	4 September 1977	
827	Jesús María Satrústegui^{4}	Spain	Real Sociedad	Atlético Madrid	4–1	10 September 1977	
828	Mario Kempes^{4}	Argentina	Valencia	Hércules	6–1	24 September 1977	
829	Rubén Cano	Argentina	Atlético Madrid	Cádiz	4–0	9 October 1977	
830	Jesús María Satrústegui	Spain	Real Sociedad	Las Palmas	4–1	9 October 1977	
831	Roberto López Ufarte	Spain	Real Sociedad	Sevilla	4–0	30 October 1977	
832	Óscar Raúl González	Argentina	Rayo Vallecano	Real Betis	4–2	1 January 1978	
833	Alvarito Ruiz	Spain	Rayo Vallecano	Cádiz	6–1	22 January 1978	
834	Pedro Verde	Argentina	Hércules	Racing Santander	4–0	26 March 1978	
835	Enrique Morán	Spain	Sporting Gijón	Real Sociedad	6–2	5 April 1978	
836	Mario Kempes^{4}	Argentina	Valencia	Rayo Vallecano	7–0	8 April 1978	
837	Rubén Cano	Argentina	Atlético Madrid	Sporting Gijón	5–1	23 April 1978	
838	Mario Kempes	Argentina	Valencia	Real Betis	4–2	30 April 1978	
839	Rubén Cano	Argentina	Atlético Madrid	Elche	4–4	30 April 1978	
840	Uli Stielike	Germany	Real Madrid	Hércules	3–0	30 April 1978	
841	Rafael Jaén	Spain	Sevilla	Espanyol	4–3	29 October 1978	
842	Orlando Giménez	Paraguay	Racing Santander	Espanyol	3–2	5 November 1978	
843	Hans Krankl	Austria	Barcelona	Celta Vigo	6–0	19 November 1978	
844	Quini	Spain	Sporting Gijón	Barcelona	3–1	26 November 1978	
845	Aitor Aguirre	Spain	Athletic Bilbao	Celta Vigo	3–1	3 December 1978	
846	Quini	Spain	Sporting Gijón	Athletic Bilbao	4–3	17 December 1978	
847	Hans Krankl^{5}	Austria	Barcelona	Rayo Vallecano	9–0	14 January 1979	
848	Miodrag Kustudić	Serbia	Hércules	Valencia	3–0	14 January 1979	
849	Leivinha	Brazil	Atlético Madrid	Celta Vigo	4–0	21 January 1979	
850	Mori^{4}	Spain	Celta Vigo	Zaragoza	5–3	4 February 1979	
851	Hans Krankl	Austria	Barcelona	Hércules	3–0	24 February 1979	
852	Pichi Alonso^{5}	Spain	Zaragoza	Espanyol	8–1	25 February 1979	
853	Hans Krankl	Austria	Barcelona	Sporting Gijón	6–0	21 April 1979	
854	Rafael Marañón^{4}	Spain	Espanyol	AD Almería	5–2	8 September 1979	
855	Héctor Scotta^{4}	Argentina	Sevilla	Burgos	6–1	16 September 1979	
856	Quini	Spain	Sporting Gijón	Barcelona	4–1	28 October 1979	
857	Fernando Morena	Uruguay	Rayo Vallecano	CD Málaga	5–1	4 November 1979	
858	Pichi Alonso^{4}	Spain	Zaragoza	Burgos	5–0	18 November 1979	
859	Mario Kempes	Argentina	Valencia	Espanyol	5–1	2 December 1979	
860	Carlos	Spain	Athletic Bilbao	Zaragoza	3–1	6 January 1980	
861	Juanito	Spain	Real Madrid	Las Palmas	3–1	13 January 1980	
862	Fernando Morena	Uruguay	Rayo Vallecano	Burgos	5–2	9 March 1980	
863	Quini	Spain	Sporting Gijón	Burgos	3–0	11 May 1980	
864	Luis Mario Cabrera	Argentina	Atlético Madrid	Valladolid	5–2	7 September 1980	
865	Francisco García Hernández	Spain	Real Madrid	Athletic Bilbao	7–1	14 September 1980	
866	Patxi Iriguíbel	Spain	Osasuna	Sporting Gijón	3–0	14 December 1980	
867	Antonio Guzmán	Spain	AD Almería	Salamanca	3–2	21 December 1980	
868	Manuel Sarabia	Spain	Athletic Bilbao	Barcelona	4–1	21 December 1980	
869	Fernando Morena	Uruguay	Valencia	Las Palmas	4–1	27 December 1980	
870	Pedro Uralde	Spain	Real Sociedad	Osasuna	3–0	11 January 1981	
871	Martín Abad	Spain	Murcia	Zaragoza	6–1	18 January 1981	
872	Gil	Brazil	Murcia	Zaragoza	6–1	18 January 1981	
873	Enrique Morán	Spain	Real Betis	Las Palmas	4–2	24 January 1981	
874	Dani	Spain	Athletic Bilbao	AD Almería	5–1	25 January 1981	
875	Juanito	Spain	Real Madrid	Salamanca	3–1	4 April 1981	
876	Quini	Spain	Barcelona	Castellón	6–1	7 October 1981	
877	Rafael Marañón	Spain	Espanyol	Castellón	4–1	22 November 1981	
878	Pintinho^{4}	Brazil	Sevilla	Zaragoza	4–1	13 December 1981	
879	Frank Arnesen	Denmark	Valencia	Castellón	4–1	13 March 1982	
880	Santi Llorente	Spain	Sevilla	Zaragoza	5–0	11 April 1982	
881	Enrique Magdaleno	Spain	Sevilla	Espanyol	4–1	25 April 1982	
882	Raúl Vicente	Paraguay	Zaragoza	Osasuna	4–0	17 October 1982	
883	Santillana	Spain	Real Madrid	Racing Santander	5–1	24 October 1982	
884	José Manuel Echeverria	Spain	Osasuna	Racing Santander	4–2	21 November 1982	
885	Isidro	Spain	Real Madrid	Real Sociedad	4–0	21 November 1982	
886	Raúl Vicente	Paraguay	Zaragoza	Racing Santander	7–2	19 December 1982	
887	Dani	Spain	Athletic Bilbao	Osasuna	4–0	5 January 1983	
888	Hipólito Rincón	Spain	Real Betis	Osasuna	4–2	3 April 1983	
889	Diego Maradona	Argentina	Barcelona	Las Palmas	7–2	17 April 1983	
890	Alberto Martín	Spain	CD Málaga	Real Madrid	6–2	11 September 1983	
891	Jorge Orlando	Argentina	Sevilla	Real Madrid	4–1	5 November 1983	
892	Armando Husillos	Argentina	Murcia	Osasuna	4–0	26 February 1984	
893	Gabriel Calderón	Argentina	Real Betis	Sporting Gijón	3–0	22 April 1984	
894	Marcos Alonso^{4}	Spain	Barcelona	Espanyol	5–2	22 April 1984	
895	Juan Barbas	Argentina	Zaragoza	Osasuna	4–1	29 April 1984	
896	Martín Pérez	Spain	Sevilla	Athletic Bilbao	3–0	9 September 1984	
897	José Roberto Figueroa	Honduras	Murcia	CD Málaga	4–0	23 September 1984	
898	Michel Pineda	Spain	Espanyol	Racing Santander	5–0	28 October 1984	
899	Quique Setién^{4}	Spain	Racing Santander	Osasuna	5–0	4 November 1984	
900	Jorge Valdano	Argentina	Real Madrid	Espanyol	4–1	4 November 1984	
901	Jesús Orejuela^{4}	Spain	Osasuna	Espanyol	5–0	25 November 1984	
902	Robert Fernández	Spain	Valencia	Zaragoza	4–1	23 December 1984	
903	José Mari Bakero^{4}	Spain	Real Sociedad	Valencia	4–1	3 February 1985	
904	Wilmar Cabrera	Uruguay	Valencia	Atlético Madrid	3–2	17 February 1985	
905	Jorge Valdano^{4}	Argentina	Real Madrid	Elche	6–1	20 February 1985	
906	Emilio Butragueño	Spain	Real Madrid	Murcia	5–0	24 March 1985	
907	Míchel	Spain	Real Madrid	Valencia	5–0	4 September 1985	
908	Sixto	Spain	Valencia	Celta Vigo	3–1	8 September 1985	
909	Jorge da Silva	Uruguay	Atlético Madrid	Valencia	5–0	10 November 1985	
910	Jorge Valdano	Argentina	Real Madrid	Cádiz	3–1	17 November 1985	
911	Roberto López Ufarte	Spain	Real Sociedad	Hércules	6–0	23 March 1986	
912	Bartolomé Márquez	Spain	Espanyol	Barcelona	5–3	20 April 1986	
913	Mágico González	El Salvador	Cádiz	Racing Santander	3–0	14 September 1986	
914	Hugo Sánchez	Mexico	Real Madrid	Real Betis	6–2	21 September 1986	
915	Ramón	Spain	Sevilla	Athletic Bilbao	3–1	26 October 1986	
916	Enrique Magdaleno	Spain	Mallorca	Las Palmas	4–0	8 November 1986	
917	Gary Lineker	England	Barcelona	Real Madrid	3–2	31 January 1987	
918	Hipólito Rincón	Spain	Real Betis	Murcia	5–0	19 April 1987	
919	Eloy	Spain	Sporting Gijón	Espanyol	4–0	24 May 1987	
920	Hipólito Rincón	Spain	Real Betis	Real Sociedad	5–1	24 May 1987	
921	Hugo Sánchez	Mexico	Real Madrid	Sporting Gijón	4–0	30 May 1987	
922	Hugo Sánchez	Mexico	Real Madrid	Sporting Gijón	7–0	6 September 1987	
923	Loren	Spain	Real Sociedad	Real Betis	3–1	6 December 1987	
924	Manolo Peña	Spain	Valladolid	Barcelona	4–2	20 December 1987	
925	Sebastián Losada	Spain	Espanyol	Valladolid	4–2	27 February 1988	
926	Juanma	Spain	Sporting Gijón	Celta Vigo	4–1	24 April 1988	
927	Baltazar	Brazil	Atlético Madrid	Cádiz	3–0	1 October 1988	
928	José Mejías	Spain	Murcia	Osasuna	6–1	2 October 1988	
929	Baltazar^{4}	Brazil	Atlético Madrid	Espanyol	6–1	16 October 1988	
930	Hipólito Rincón	Spain	Real Betis	Murcia	3–0	23 October 1988	
931	Baltazar	Brazil	Atlético Madrid	Real Betis	6–2	30 November 1988	
932	Hugo Sánchez	Mexico	Real Madrid	Espanyol	4–1	1 January 1989	
933	José Ángel Ziganda	Spain	Osasuna	Oviedo	3–1	11 January 1989	
934	Míchel	Spain	Real Madrid	Sporting Gijón	5–1	12 February 1989	
935	Julio Salinas	Spain	Barcelona	Oviedo	7–1	30 April 1989	
936	Guillermo Amor	Spain	Barcelona	Celta Vigo	3–1	14 May 1989	
937	Baltazar	Brazil	Atlético Madrid	Real Madrid	3–3	20 May 1989	
938	Hugo Sánchez	Mexico	Real Madrid	Logroñés	5–1	17 December 1989	
939	Hugo Sánchez	Mexico	Real Madrid	Castellón	7–0	28 January 1990	
940	Anton Polster	Austria	Sevilla	Cádiz	4–0	18 February 1990	
941	Janko Janković	Croatia	Valladolid	Valencia	3–4	3 March 1990	
942	Robert Fernández	Spain	Barcelona	Celta Vigo	6–0	11 March 1990	
943	Gabriel Moya	Spain	Valladolid	Sevilla	3–0	25 March 1990	
944	Hugo Sánchez	Mexico	Real Madrid	Oviedo	5–2	5 May 1990	
945	Enric Cuxart	Spain	Valencia	Logroñés	4–0	6 May 1990	
946	Pedro Alcañiz^{4}	Spain	Castellón	Tenerife	5–1	7 October 1990	
947	Anton Polster	Austria	Sevilla	Tenerife	4–0	14 October 1990	
948	Hristo Stoichkov	Bulgaria	Barcelona	Castellón	6–0	18 November 1990	
949	Miguel Pardeza	Spain	Zaragoza	Sporting Gijón	4–0	25 November 1990	
950	Jan Urban	Poland	Osasuna	Real Madrid	4–0	30 December 1990	
951	Gabriel Moya	Spain	Valladolid	Tenerife	6–2	13 January 1991	
952	Aitor Begiristain	Spain	Barcelona	Valladolid	5–1	24 February 1991	
953	Hristo Stoichkov^{4}	Bulgaria	Barcelona	Athletic Bilbao	6–0	10 March 1991	
954	Gregorio Fonseca	Spain	Valladolid	Real Sociedad	4–2	7 April 1991	
955	Pepe Mel	Spain	Real Betis	Logroñés	3–2	7 April 1991	
956	Luis Enrique	Spain	Sporting Gijón	Espanyol	3–0	9 June 1991	
957	Fernando Hierro	Spain	Real Madrid	Espanyol	5–1	1 December 1991	
958	Manolo	Spain	Atlético Madrid	Valladolid	5–1	1 December 1991	
959	Juan Antonio Pizzi	Argentina	Tenerife	Athletic Bilbao	4–1	4 January 1992	
960	Gheorghe Hagi	Romania	Real Madrid	Athletic Bilbao	5–0	16 February 1992	
961	Pedro Uralde	Spain	Deportivo La Coruña	Sporting Gijón	5–2	15 March 1992	
962	Manolo^{4}	Spain	Atlético Madrid	Cádiz	5–1	12 April 1992	
963	Hristo Stoichkov^{4}	Bulgaria	Barcelona	Albacete	7–1	18 April 1992	
964	Fernando Hierro^{4}	Spain	Real Madrid	Espanyol	7–0	19 April 1992	
965	Goran Milojević	Serbia	Mallorca	Deportivo La Coruña	4–2	26 April 1992	
966	Davor Šuker	Croatia	Sevilla	Albacete	4–3	6 September 1992	
967	Hristo Stoichkov	Bulgaria	Barcelona	Atlético Madrid	4–1	19 September 1992	
968	Anton Polster	Austria	Rayo Vallecano	Barcelona	3–3	20 December 1992	
969	Bebeto	Brazil	Deportivo La Coruña	Espanyol	3–0	3 January 1993	
970	Rommel Fernández	Panama	Albacete	Cádiz	5–0	3 January 1993	
971	Raúl Dos Santos	Uruguay	Albacete	Sporting Gijón	6–2	21 March 1993	
972	Lyuboslav Penev	Bulgaria	Valencia	Deportivo La Coruña	3–0	1 May 1993	
973	Iván Zamorano	Chile	Real Madrid	Sevilla	5–0	23 May 1993	
974	José Ángel Ziganda	Spain	Athletic Bilbao	Albacete	5–4	26 May 1993	
975	Julen Guerrero	Spain	Athletic Bilbao	Albacete	4–1	5 September 1993	
976	Romário	Brazil	Barcelona	Real Sociedad	3–0	5 September 1993	
977	Aitor Begiristain	Spain	Barcelona	Zaragoza	4–1	26 September 1993	
978	Oleg Salenko	Russia	Logroñés	Athletic Bilbao	4–2	7 October 1993	
979	Romário	Brazil	Barcelona	Atlético Madrid	3–4	30 October 1993	
980	Quique Setién	Spain	Racing Santander	Valladolid	5–1	28 November 1993	
981	Romário	Brazil	Barcelona	Real Madrid	5–0	8 January 1994	
982	Carlos Muñoz	Spain	Oviedo	Rayo Vallecano	5–0	9 January 1994	
983	Xavier Escaich^{4}	Spain	Sporting Gijón	Osasuna	7–1	16 January 1994	
984	Romário	Brazil	Barcelona	Osasuna	8–1	19 February 1994	
985	Bebeto	Brazil	Deportivo La Coruña	Albacete	5–1	23 February 1994	
986	Nílson	Brazil	Albacete	Oviedo	5–0	27 February 1994	
987	Romário	Brazil	Barcelona	Atlético Madrid	5–3	12 March 1994	
988	Davor Šuker	Croatia	Sevilla	Logroñés	4–1	26 March 1994	
989	Julen Guerrero^{4}	Spain	Athletic Bilbao	Sporting Gijón	7–0	3 April 1994	
990	Dmitri Popov	Russia	Racing Santander	Valladolid	3–0	6 April 1994	
991	Fernando Gómez	Spain	Valencia	Albacete	4–0	10 April 1994	
992	Luis García	Mexico	Atlético Madrid	Athletic Bilbao	4–2	17 April 1994	
993	Predrag Mijatović	Montenegro	Valencia	Atlético Madrid	4–2	4 September 1994	
994	Ángel Cuéllar	Spain	Real Betis	Sporting Gijón	5–0	25 September 1994	
995	Kiko	Spain	Atlético Madrid	Valladolid	6–0	2 October 1994	
996	Vladimir Gudelj	Bosnia and Herzegovina	Celta Vigo	Real Sociedad	3–2	20 November 1994	
997	Iván Zamorano	Chile	Real Madrid	Barcelona	5–0	7 January 1995	
998	Oli	Spain	Oviedo	Racing Santander	3–1	29 January 1995	
999	Slaviša Jokanović	Serbia	Oviedo	Espanyol	3–0	5 February 1995	
1000	José Luis Zalazar	Uruguay	Albacete	Real Betis	3–1	12 February 1995	
1001	Meho Kodro^{4}	Bosnia and Herzegovina	Real Sociedad	Tenerife	5–2	5 March 1995	
1002	Juan Antonio Pizzi	Argentina	Tenerife	Valladolid	4–1	19 March 1995	
1003	Bebeto	Brazil	Deportivo La Coruña	Tenerife	4–1	9 April 1995	
1004	Luis Pérez	Spain	Real Sociedad	Logroñés	6–0	14 May 1995	
1005	Meho Kodro	Bosnia and Herzegovina	Real Sociedad	Athletic Bilbao	5–0	28 May 1995	
1006	Lyuboslav Penev	Bulgaria	Valencia	Compostela	4–1	10 June 1995	
1007	Vladimir Gudelj	Bosnia and Herzegovina	Celta Vigo	Logroñés	3–0	18 June 1995	
1008	Julio Salinas	Spain	Deportivo La Coruña	Albacete	8–2	18 June 1995	
1009	Bebeto^{5}	Brazil	Deportivo La Coruña	Albacete	5–0	1 October 1995	
1010	José Mari Bakero	Spain	Barcelona	Oviedo	4–1	4 October 1995	
1011	Claudio Barragán	Spain	Salamanca	Rayo Vallecano	4–1	8 October 1995	
1012	Vladimir Gudelj	Bosnia and Herzegovina	Celta Vigo	Sevilla	4–0	22 October 1995	
1013	Bebeto	Brazil	Deportivo La Coruña	Real Madrid	3–0	21 December 1995	
1014	Juan Antonio Pizzi^{4}	Argentina	Tenerife	Sevilla	4–2	21 January 1996	
1015	Pepe Gálvez	Spain	Valencia	Valladolid	5–2	24 January 1996	
1016	Fernando Morientes	Spain	Zaragoza	Valencia	4–1	3 February 1996	
1017	Alen Peternac	Croatia	Valladolid	Racing Santander	3–1	2 March 1996	
1018	Juan Sabas	Spain	Real Betis	Valencia	3–0	3 March 1996	
1019	Julio Salinas	Spain	Sporting Gijón	Rayo Vallecano	3–1	31 March 1996	
1020	Luis Pérez	Spain	Real Sociedad	Valencia	5–2	14 April 1996	
1021	Ismael Urzaiz	Spain	Espanyol	Rayo Vallecano	4–2	14 April 1996	
1022	Ovidiu Stîngă	Romania	Salamanca	Racing Santander	5–0	5 May 1996	
1023	Gheorghe Craioveanu	Romania	Real Sociedad	Albacete	8–1	12 May 1996	
1024	Daniel Aquino	Argentina	Rayo Vallecano	Zaragoza	4–3	19 May 1996	
1025	Alen Peternac^{5}	Croatia	Valladolid	Oviedo	8–3	19 May 1996	
1026	José María Quevedo	Spain	Valladolid	Oviedo	8–3	19 May 1996	
1027	Davor Šuker	Croatia	Sevilla	Salamanca	3–1	25 May 1996	
1028	José Ángel Ziganda	Spain	Athletic Bilbao	Rayo Vallecano	3–1	25 May 1996	
1029	Davor Šuker	Croatia	Real Madrid	Real Sociedad	6–1	19 October 1996	
1030	Ronaldo	Brazil	Barcelona	Valencia	3–2	26 October 1996	
1031	Julen Guerrero	Spain	Athletic Bilbao	Logroñés	6–0	27 October 1996	
1032	Davor Šuker	Croatia	Real Madrid	Valencia	4–2	24 November 1996	
1033	Felipe Miñambres	Spain	Tenerife	Espanyol	5–1	22 December 1996	
1034	Luis Enrique	Spain	Barcelona	Real Betis	4–2	19 January 1997	
1035	Ismael Urzaiz	Spain	Athletic Bilbao	Oviedo	3–2	16 February 1997	
1036	Fernando Morientes	Spain	Zaragoza	Sporting Gijón	5–0	19 February 1997	
1037	Ronaldo	Brazil	Barcelona	Zaragoza	4–1	23 February 1997	
1038	Davor Šuker	Croatia	Real Madrid	Oviedo	6–1	23 February 1997	
1039	Slaviša Jokanović	Serbia	Tenerife	Barcelona	4–0	1 March 1997	
1040	Alfonso	Spain	Real Betis	Atlético Madrid	3–2	9 March 1997	
1041	Alfonso	Spain	Real Betis	Rayo Vallecano	4–0	16 March 1997	
1042	Ronaldo	Brazil	Barcelona	Atlético Madrid	5–2	13 April 1997	
1043	Vladimir Gudelj	Bosnia and Herzegovina	Celta Vigo	Real Madrid	4–0	22 June 1997	
1044	Fernando Correa	Uruguay	Racing Santander	Sporting Gijón	4–1	5 October 1997	
1045	Christian Vieri	Italy	Atlético Madrid	Zaragoza	5–1	18 October 1997	
1046	Finidi George	Nigeria	Real Betis	Tenerife	3–0	7 December 1997	
1047	Pauleta	Portugal	Salamanca	Deportivo La Coruña	4–1	7 December 1997	
1048	Adrian Ilie	Romania	Valencia	Racing Santander	6–1	25 January 1998	
1049	Gabriel Popescu	Romania	Salamanca	Atlético Madrid	5–4	21 March 1998	
1050	Christian Vieri^{4}	Italy	Atlético Madrid	Salamanca	4–5	21 March 1998	
1051	Fernando Correa	Uruguay	Racing Santander	Athletic Bilbao	3–4	29 March 1998	
1052	Romano Sion	Suriname	Compostela	Deportivo La Coruña	6–2	10 May 1998	
1053	Víctor	Spain	Racing Santander	Salamanca	4–1	15 November 1998	
1054	Raúl	Spain	Real Madrid	Valladolid	3–2	7 February 1999	
1055	Rivaldo	Brazil	Barcelona	Oviedo	3–1	4 April 1999	
1056	Lyuboslav Penev	Bulgaria	Celta Vigo	Real Madrid	5–1	11 April 1999	
1057	Leonardo Biagini	Argentina	Mallorca	Athletic Bilbao	6–1	25 April 1999	
1058	Claudio López	Argentina	Valencia	Alavés	5–0	1 May 1999	
1059	Julio Dely Valdés	Panama	Oviedo	Salamanca	3–2	13 June 1999	
1060	Roy Makaay	Netherlands	Deportivo La Coruña	Alavés	4–1	22 August 1999	
1061	Dani	Spain	Barcelona	Real Betis	4–1	25 September 1999	
1062	Salva Ballesta^{4}	Spain	Racing Santander	Real Sociedad	5–2	13 October 1999	
1063	Salva Ballesta	Spain	Racing Santander	Celta Vigo	3–0	16 October 1999	
1064	Savo Milošević	Serbia	Zaragoza	Racing Santander	4–1	24 October 1999	
1065	Catanha	Brazil	Málaga	Oviedo	4–0	21 November 1999	
1066	Pauleta	Portugal	Deportivo La Coruña	Sevilla	5–2	21 November 1999	
1067	Catanha	Brazil	Málaga	Celta Vigo	4–2	22 December 1999	
1068	Mario Turdó	Argentina	Celta Vigo	Oviedo	5–3	16 January 2000	
1069	Víctor	Spain	Valladolid	Deportivo La Coruña	4–1	30 January 2000	
1070	Roy Makaay	Netherlands	Deportivo La Coruña	Atlético Madrid	4–1	8 April 2000	
1071	Míchel	Spain	Rayo Vallecano	Real Sociedad	4–1	22 October 2000	
1072	Diego Tristán	Spain	Deportivo La Coruña	Las Palmas	4–0	31 October 2000	
1073	Laurențiu Roșu	Romania	Numancia	Real Madrid	3–1	4 November 2000	
1074	Catanha	Brazil	Celta Vigo	Barcelona	3–3	2 December 2000	
1075	Luis Enrique	Spain	Barcelona	Athletic Bilbao	7–0	3 February 2001	
1076	Diego Tristán	Spain	Deportivo La Coruña	Real Sociedad	4–1	10 February 2001	
1077	John Carew	Norway	Valencia	Villarreal	3–1	25 February 2001	
1078	Valeri Karpin	Russia	Celta Vigo	Valencia	3–2	18 March 2001	
1079	Patrick Kluivert	Netherlands	Barcelona	Villarreal	4–4	8 April 2001	
1080	Guti	Spain	Real Madrid	Villarreal	4–0	14 April 2001	
1081	Julio Dely Valdés	Panama	Málaga	Valencia	3–0	13 May 2001	
1082	Diego Tristán	Spain	Deportivo La Coruña	Oviedo	3–2	20 May 2001	
1083	Rivaldo	Brazil	Barcelona	Valencia	3–2	17 June 2001	
1084	Tote	Spain	Valladolid	Athletic Bilbao	4–1	14 October 2001	
1085	Roy Makaay	Netherlands	Deportivo La Coruña	Real Sociedad	3–1	17 November 2001	
1086	Patrick Kluivert^{4}	Netherlands	Barcelona	Tenerife	6–0	2 February 2002	
1087	Fernando Morientes^{5}	Spain	Real Madrid	Las Palmas	7–0	10 February 2002	
1088	Patrick Kluivert	Netherlands	Barcelona	Málaga	5–1	3 March 2002	
1089	Catanha	Brazil	Celta Vigo	Valladolid	4–2	10 March 2002	
1090	Diego Tristán	Spain	Deportivo La Coruña	Osasuna	3–1	16 March 2002	
1091	Fernando Hierro	Spain	Real Madrid	Zaragoza	3–1	24 March 2002	
1092	Diego Tristán	Spain	Deportivo La Coruña	Mallorca	5–0	6 April 2002	
1093	Kiki Musampa	Netherlands	Málaga	Recreativo Huelva	3–2	1 September 2002	
1094	Julio Álvarez	Venezuela	Rayo Vallecano	Racing Santander	3–1	22 September 2002	
1095	Pablo Aimar	Argentina	Valencia	Athletic Bilbao	5–1	26 October 2002	
1096	Patrick Kluivert	Netherlands	Barcelona	Alavés	6–1	26 October 2002	
1097	Walter Pandiani	Uruguay	Mallorca	Valladolid	3–1	2 November 2002	
1098	José Mari	Spain	Atlético Madrid	Athletic Bilbao	3–3	10 November 2002	
1099	Ismael Urzaiz	Spain	Athletic Bilbao	Atlético Madrid	3–3	10 November 2002	
1100	Patrick Kluivert	Netherlands	Barcelona	Mallorca	4–0	21 December 2002	
1101	Javier Saviola	Argentina	Barcelona	Real Betis	4–0	22 February 2003	
1102	Diego Tristán	Spain	Deportivo La Coruña	Alavés	6–0	22 February 2003	
1103	Ronaldo	Brazil	Real Madrid	Alavés	5–1	1 March 2003	
1104	Roy Makaay	Netherlands	Deportivo La Coruña	Recreativo Huelva	5–0	4 May 2003	
1105	Raúl	Spain	Real Madrid	Valladolid	7–2	13 September 2003	
1106	Ricardo Oliveira	Brazil	Valencia	Mallorca	5–0	2 November 2003	
1107	Salva Ballesta	Spain	Málaga	Barcelona	5–1	3 December 2003	
1108	Víctor	Spain	Deportivo La Coruña	Celta Vigo	5–0	3 January 2004	
1109	Javi Guerrero	Spain	Racing Santander	Murcia	3–2	25 January 2004	
1110	Ricardo Oliveira	Brazil	Valencia	Málaga	6–1	31 January 2004	
1111	Júlio Baptista	Brazil	Sevilla	Murcia	3–1	14 February 2004	
1112	Mista	Spain	Valencia	Mallorca	5–1	21 March 2004	
1113	Júlio Baptista^{4}	Brazil	Sevilla	Racing Santander	5–2	18 April 2004	
1114	David Villa^{4}	Spain	Zaragoza	Sevilla	4–4	25 April 2004	
1115	Maxi Rodríguez	Argentina	Espanyol	Real Betis	4–1	12 September 2004	
1116	Sergio Pachón	Spain	Getafe	Athletic Bilbao	3–1	3 October 2004	
1117	Juan Román Riquelme	Argentina	Villarreal	Valencia	3–1	23 January 2005	
1118	Ricardo Oliveira	Brazil	Real Betis	Athletic Bilbao	4–4	13 February 2005	
1119	Salva Ballesta	Spain	Atlético Madrid	Mallorca	4–0	3 April 2005	
1120	Yossi Benayoun	Israel	Racing Santander	Deportivo La Coruña	4–1	24 April 2005	
1121	Diego Forlán	Uruguay	Villarreal	Barcelona	3–3	22 May 2005	
1122	Juan Arango	Venezuela	Mallorca	Real Sociedad	5–2	17 September 2005	
1123	Nenê	Brazil	Alavés	Getafe	3–4	18 September 2005	
1124	Zinedine Zidane	France	Real Madrid	Sevilla	4–2	15 January 2006	
1125	Dani	Spain	Real Betis	Zaragoza	3–4	5 February 2006	
1126	Luis García	Spain	Espanyol	Sevilla	5–0	26 February 2006	
1127	David Villa	Spain	Valencia	Athletic Bilbao	3–0	23 April 2006	
1128	Ruud van Nistelrooy	Netherlands	Real Madrid	Levante	4–1	10 September 2006	
1129	Ruud van Nistelrooy^{4}	Netherlands	Real Madrid	Osasuna	4–1	12 November 2006	
1130	Lionel Messi	Argentina	Barcelona	Real Madrid	3–3	10 March 2007	
1131	Walter Pandiani	Uruguay	Espanyol	Real Madrid	3–4	12 May 2007	
1132	Diego Forlán	Uruguay	Villarreal	Osasuna	4–1	13 May 2007	
1133	Aritz Aduriz	Spain	Athletic Bilbao	Zaragoza	3–4	19 May 2007	
1134	Roberto Soldado	Spain	Osasuna	Levante	4–1	20 May 2007	
1135	Thierry Henry	France	Barcelona	Levante	4–1	29 September 2007	
1136	Christian Riganò	Italy	Levante	Almería	3–0	4 November 2007	
1137	Joseba Llorente	Spain	Valladolid	Recreativo Huelva	3–1	13 January 2008	
1138	Samuel Eto'o	Cameroon	Barcelona	Levante	5–1	24 February 2008	
1139	Juan Arango	Venezuela	Mallorca	Recreativo Huelva	7–1	9 March 2008	
1140	Xisco	Spain	Deportivo La Coruña	Murcia	3–1	30 March 2008	
1141	Daniel Güiza	Spain	Mallorca	Murcia	4–1	30 April 2008	
1142	David Villa	Spain	Valencia	Levante	5–1	11 May 2008	
1143	Giovani dos Santos	Mexico	Barcelona	Murcia	5–3	17 May 2008	
1144	Mate Bilić	Croatia	Sporting Gijón	Sevilla	3–4	13 September 2008	
1145	Rafael van der Vaart	Netherlands	Real Madrid	Sporting Gijón	7–1	24 September 2008	
1146	Samuel Eto'o	Cameroon	Barcelona	Almería	5–0	25 October 2008	
1147	Mohamed Tchité	Burundi	Racing Santander	Valencia	4–2	1 November 2008	
1148	Gonzalo Higuaín^{4}	Argentina	Real Madrid	Málaga	4–3	8 November 2008	
1149	Samuel Eto'o^{4}	Cameroon	Barcelona	Valladolid	6–0	8 November 2008	
1150	Thierry Henry	France	Barcelona	Valencia	4–0	6 December 2008	
1151	Roberto Soldado	Spain	Getafe	Sporting Gijón	5–1	25 January 2009	
1152	Frédéric Kanouté	Mali	Sevilla	Valladolid	4–1	21 March 2009	
1153	Raúl	Spain	Real Madrid	Sevilla	4–2	26 April 2009	
1154	Diego Forlán	Uruguay	Atlético Madrid	Athletic Bilbao	4–1	23 May 2009	
1155	Raúl Tamudo	Spain	Espanyol	Málaga	3–0	31 May 2009	
1156	Roberto Soldado	Spain	Getafe	Racing Santander	4–1	30 August 2009	
1157	Seydou Keita	Mali	Barcelona	Zaragoza	6–1	25 October 2009	
1158	Roberto Soldado	Spain	Getafe	Xerez	5–1	29 November 2009	
1159	Lionel Messi	Argentina	Barcelona	Tenerife	5–0	10 January 2010	
1160	Lionel Messi	Argentina	Barcelona	Valencia	3–0	10 March 2010	
1161	Gonzalo Higuaín	Argentina	Real Madrid	Valladolid	4–1	14 March 2010	
1162	Lionel Messi	Argentina	Barcelona	Zaragoza	4–2	21 March 2010	
1163	Cristiano Ronaldo	Portugal	Real Madrid	Mallorca	4–1	5 May 2010	
1164	Cristiano Ronaldo^{4}	Portugal	Real Madrid	Racing Santander	6–1	23 October 2010	
1165	Lionel Messi	Argentina	Barcelona	Almería	8–0	20 November 2010	
1166	Cristiano Ronaldo	Portugal	Real Madrid	Athletic Bilbao	5–1	20 November 2010	
1167	Cristiano Ronaldo	Portugal	Real Madrid	Villarreal	4–2	9 January 2011	
1168	Luís Fabiano	Brazil	Sevilla	Levante	4–1	22 January 2011	
1169	Lionel Messi	Argentina	Barcelona	Atlético Madrid	3–0	5 February 2011	
1170	Cristiano Ronaldo	Portugal	Real Madrid	Málaga	7–0	3 March 2011	
1171	Roberto Soldado^{4}	Spain	Valencia	Getafe	4–2	2 April 2011	
1172	Diego Costa	Brazil	Atlético Madrid	Osasuna	3–2	3 April 2011	
1173	Gonzalo Higuaín	Argentina	Real Madrid	Valencia	6–3	23 April 2011	
1174	Cristiano Ronaldo^{4}	Portugal	Real Madrid	Sevilla	6–2	7 May 2011	
1175	Cristiano Ronaldo	Portugal	Real Madrid	Getafe	4–0	10 May 2011	
1176	Emmanuel Adebayor	Togo	Real Madrid	Almería	8–1	21 May 2011	
1177	Sergio Agüero	Argentina	Atlético Madrid	Mallorca	4–3	21 May 2011	
1178	Roberto Soldado	Spain	Valencia	Racing Santander	4–3	27 August 2011	
1179	Cristiano Ronaldo	Portugal	Real Madrid	Zaragoza	6–0	28 August 2011	
1180	Lionel Messi	Argentina	Barcelona	Osasuna	8–0	17 September 2011	
1181	Radamel Falcao	Colombia	Atlético Madrid	Racing Santander	4–0	18 September 2011	
1182	Cristiano Ronaldo	Portugal	Real Madrid	Rayo Vallecano	6–2	24 September 2011	
1183	Lionel Messi	Argentina	Barcelona	Atlético Madrid	5–0	24 September 2011	
1184	Gonzalo Higuaín	Argentina	Real Madrid	Espanyol	4–0	2 October 2011	
1185	Gonzalo Higuaín	Argentina	Real Madrid	Real Betis	4–1	14 October 2011	
1186	Cristiano Ronaldo	Portugal	Real Madrid	Málaga	4–0	22 October 2011	
1187	Lionel Messi	Argentina	Barcelona	Mallorca	5–0	29 October 2011	
1188	Cristiano Ronaldo	Portugal	Real Madrid	Osasuna	7–1	6 November 2011	
1189	Cristiano Ronaldo	Portugal	Real Madrid	Sevilla	6–2	17 December 2011	
1190	Radamel Falcao	Colombia	Atlético Madrid	Real Sociedad	4–0	21 January 2012	
1191	Lionel Messi	Argentina	Barcelona	Málaga	4–1	22 January 2012	
1192	Fernando Llorente	Spain	Athletic Bilbao	Rayo Vallecano	3–2	28 January 2012	
1193	Cristiano Ronaldo	Portugal	Real Madrid	Levante	4–2	12 February 2012	
1194	Lionel Messi^{4}	Argentina	Barcelona	Valencia	5–1	19 February 2012	
1195	Kalu Uche	Nigeria	Espanyol	Rayo Vallecano	5–1	11 March 2012	
1196	Roberto Soldado	Spain	Valencia	Athletic Bilbao	3–0	18 March 2012	
1197	Lionel Messi	Argentina	Barcelona	Granada	5–3	20 March 2012	
1198	Cristiano Ronaldo	Portugal	Real Madrid	Atlético Madrid	4–1	11 April 2012	
1199	Lionel Messi	Argentina	Barcelona	Málaga	4–1	2 May 2012	
1200	Lionel Messi^{4}	Argentina	Barcelona	Espanyol	4–0	5 May 2012	
1201	Radamel Falcao	Colombia	Atlético Madrid	Athletic Bilbao	4–0	27 August 2012	
1202	Cristiano Ronaldo	Portugal	Real Madrid	Deportivo La Coruña	5–1	30 September 2012	
1203	Lionel Messi	Argentina	Barcelona	Deportivo La Coruña	5–4	20 October 2012	
1204	Radamel Falcao^{5}	Colombia	Atlético Madrid	Deportivo La Coruña	6–0	9 December 2012	
1205	Xabi Prieto	Spain	Real Sociedad	Real Madrid	3–4	6 January 2013	
1206	Cristiano Ronaldo	Portugal	Real Madrid	Getafe	4–0	27 January 2013	
1207	Lionel Messi^{4}	Argentina	Barcelona	Osasuna	5–1	27 January 2013	
1208	Cristiano Ronaldo	Portugal	Real Madrid	Sevilla	4–1	9 February 2013	
1209	Álvaro Negredo	Spain	Sevilla	Celta Vigo	4–1	4 March 2013	
1210	Cesc Fàbregas	Spain	Barcelona	Mallorca	5–0	6 April 2013	
1211	Álvaro Negredo^{4}	Spain	Sevilla	Valencia	4–3	1 June 2013	
1212	Lionel Messi	Argentina	Barcelona	Valencia	3–2	2 September 2013	
1213	Mounir El Hamdaoui	Morocco	Málaga	Rayo Vallecano	5–0	15 September 2013	
1214	Pedro	Spain	Barcelona	Rayo Vallecano	4–0	21 September 2013	
1215	Cristiano Ronaldo	Portugal	Real Madrid	Sevilla	7–3	30 October 2013	
1216	Youssef El-Arabi	Morocco	Granada	Málaga	3–1	8 November 2013	
1217	Cristiano Ronaldo	Portugal	Real Madrid	Real Sociedad	5–1	9 November 2013	
1218	Carlos Vela^{4}	Mexico	Real Sociedad	Celta Vigo	4–3	23 November 2013	
1219	Sergio García	Spain	Espanyol	Rayo Vallecano	4–1	24 November 2013	
1220	Gareth Bale	Wales	Real Madrid	Valladolid	4–0	30 November 2013	
1221	Jonas	Brazil	Valencia	Osasuna	3–0	1 December 2013	
1222	Javi Guerra	Spain	Valladolid	Celta Vigo	3–0	16 December 2013	
1223	Pedro	Spain	Barcelona	Getafe	5–2	22 December 2013	
1224	Alexis Sánchez	Chile	Barcelona	Elche	4–0	5 January 2014	
1225	Ikechukwu Uche	Nigeria	Villarreal	Rayo Vallecano	5–2	6 January 2014	
1226	Aritz Aduriz	Spain	Athletic Bilbao	Granada	4–0	28 February 2014	
1227	Lionel Messi	Argentina	Barcelona	Osasuna	7–0	16 March 2014	
1228	Lionel Messi	Argentina	Barcelona	Real Madrid	4–3	23 March 2014	
1229	Cristiano Ronaldo	Portugal	Real Madrid	Deportivo La Coruña	8–2	20 September 2014	
1230	Cristiano Ronaldo^{4}	Portugal	Real Madrid	Elche	5–1	23 September 2014	
1231	Neymar	Brazil	Barcelona	Granada	6–0	27 September 2014	
1232	Cristiano Ronaldo	Portugal	Real Madrid	Athletic Bilbao	5–0	5 October 2014	
1233	Lionel Messi	Argentina	Barcelona	Sevilla	5–1	22 November 2014	
1234	Carlos Vela	Mexico	Real Sociedad	Elche	3–0	28 November 2014	
1235	Cristiano Ronaldo	Portugal	Real Madrid	Celta Vigo	3–0	6 December 2014	
1236	Lionel Messi	Argentina	Barcelona	Espanyol	5–1	7 December 2014	
1237	Antoine Griezmann	France	Atlético Madrid	Athletic Bilbao	4–1	21 December 2014	
1238	Lionel Messi	Argentina	Barcelona	Deportivo La Coruña	4–0	18 January 2015	
1239	David Barral	Spain	Levante	Málaga	4–1	7 February 2015	
1240	Lionel Messi	Argentina	Barcelona	Levante	5–0	15 February 2015	
1241	Alberto Bueno^{4}	Spain	Rayo Vallecano	Levante	4–2	28 February 2015	
1242	Lionel Messi	Argentina	Barcelona	Rayo Vallecano	6–1	8 March 2015	
1243	David Barral	Spain	Levante	Almería	4–1	4 April 2015	
1244	Cristiano Ronaldo^{5}	Portugal	Real Madrid	Granada	9–1	5 April 2015	
1245	Santi Mina^{4}	Spain	Celta Vigo	Rayo Vallecano	6–1	11 April 2015	
1246	Luis Suárez	Uruguay	Barcelona	Córdoba	8–0	2 May 2015	
1247	Cristiano Ronaldo	Portugal	Real Madrid	Sevilla	3–2	2 May 2015	
1248	Cristiano Ronaldo	Portugal	Real Madrid	Espanyol	4–1	17 May 2015	
1249	Cristiano Ronaldo	Portugal	Real Madrid	Getafe	7–3	23 May 2015	
1250	Cristiano Ronaldo^{5}	Portugal	Real Madrid	Espanyol	6–0	12 September 2015	
1251	Imanol Agirretxe	Spain	Real Sociedad	Granada	3–0	22 September 2015	
1252	Charles	Brazil	Málaga	Real Sociedad	3–1	3 October 2015	
1253	Neymar^{4}	Brazil	Barcelona	Rayo Vallecano	5–2	17 October 2015	
1254	Kevin Gameiro	France	Sevilla	Getafe	5–0	24 October 2015	
1255	Luis Suárez	Uruguay	Barcelona	Eibar	3–1	25 October 2015	
1256	Aritz Aduriz	Spain	Athletic Bilbao	Rayo Vallecano	3–0	29 November 2015	
1257	Antonio Sanabria	Paraguay	Sporting Gijón	Las Palmas	3–1	5 December 2015	
1258	Gareth Bale^{4}	Wales	Real Madrid	Rayo Vallecano	10–2	20 December 2015	
1259	Karim Benzema	France	Real Madrid	Rayo Vallecano	10–2	20 December 2015	
1260	Lionel Messi	Argentina	Barcelona	Granada	4–0	9 January 2016	
1261	Gareth Bale	Wales	Real Madrid	Deportivo La Coruña	5–0	9 January 2016	
1262	Luis Suárez	Uruguay	Barcelona	Athletic Bilbao	6–0	17 January 2016	
1263	Antonio Sanabria	Paraguay	Sporting Gijón	Real Sociedad	5–1	22 January 2016	
1264	Cristiano Ronaldo	Portugal	Real Madrid	Espanyol	6–0	31 January 2016	
1265	Luis Suárez	Uruguay	Barcelona	Celta Vigo	6–1	14 February 2016	
1266	Aritz Aduriz	Spain	Athletic Bilbao	Deportivo La Coruña	4–1	2 March 2016	
1267	Lionel Messi	Argentina	Barcelona	Rayo Vallecano	5–1	3 March 2016	
1268	Cristiano Ronaldo^{4}	Portugal	Real Madrid	Celta Vigo	7–1	5 March 2016	
1269	Luis Suárez^{4}	Uruguay	Barcelona	Deportivo La Coruña	8–0	20 April 2016	
1270	Paco Alcácer	Spain	Valencia	Eibar	4–0	20 April 2016	
1271	Youssef El-Arabi	Morocco	Granada	Levante	5–1	21 April 2016	
1272	Luis Suárez^{4}	Uruguay	Barcelona	Sporting Gijón	6–0	23 April 2016	
1273	Luis Suárez	Uruguay	Barcelona	Granada	3–0	14 May 2016	
1274	Luis Suárez	Uruguay	Barcelona	Real Betis	6–2	20 August 2016	
1275	Yannick Carrasco	Belgium	Atlético Madrid	Granada	7–1	15 October 2016	
1276	Cristiano Ronaldo	Portugal	Real Madrid	Alavés	4–1	29 October 2016	
1277	Cristiano Ronaldo	Portugal	Real Madrid	Atlético Madrid	3–0	19 November 2016	
1278	Vicente Iborra†	Spain	Sevilla	Celta Vigo	3–0	11 December 2016	
1279	Wissam Ben Yedder	France	Sevilla	Real Sociedad	4–0	7 January 2017	
1280	Kevin Gameiro†	France	Atlético Madrid	Sporting Gijón	4–1	18 February 2017	
1281	Giuseppe Rossi	Italy	Celta Vigo	Las Palmas	3–1	3 March 2017	
1282	Álvaro Morata	Spain	Real Madrid	Leganés	4–2	5 April 2017	
1283	Neymar	Brazil	Barcelona	Las Palmas	4–1	14 May 2017	
1284	Lionel Messi	Argentina	Barcelona	Espanyol	5–0	9 September 2017	
1285	Simone Zaza	Italy	Valencia	Málaga	5–0	19 September 2017	
1286	Lionel Messi^{4}	Argentina	Barcelona	Eibar	6–1	19 September 2017	
1287	Cédric Bakambu	DR Congo	Villarreal	Eibar	3–0	1 October 2017	
1288	Iago Aspas	Spain	Celta Vigo	Las Palmas	5–2	16 October 2017	
1289	Ibai Gómez	Spain	Alavés	Girona	3–2	4 December 2017	
1290	Michael Olunga†	Kenya	Girona	Las Palmas	6–0	13 January 2018	
1291	Cristiano Ronaldo	Portugal	Real Madrid	Real Sociedad	5–2	10 February 2018	
1292	Luis Suárez	Uruguay	Barcelona	Girona	6–1	24 February 2018	
1293	Antoine Griezmann	France	Atlético Madrid	Sevilla	5–2	25 February 2018	
1294	Antoine Griezmann^{4}	France	Atlético Madrid	Leganés	4–0	28 February 2018	
1295	Cristiano Ronaldo^{4}	Portugal	Real Madrid	Girona	6–3	18 March 2018	
1296	Iago Aspas	Spain	Celta Vigo	Sevilla	4–0	7 April 2018	
1297	Lionel Messi	Argentina	Barcelona	Leganés	3–1	7 April 2018	
1298	Carlos Bacca	Colombia	Villarreal	Celta Vigo	4–1	28 April 2018	
1299	Lionel Messi	Argentina	Barcelona	Deportivo La Coruña	4–2	29 April 2018	
1300	Emmanuel Boateng	Ghana	Levante	Barcelona	5–4	13 May 2018	
1301	Philippe Coutinho	Brazil	Barcelona	Levante	4–5	13 May 2018	
1302	André Silva	Portugal	Sevilla	Rayo Vallecano	4–1	19 August 2018	
1303	Wissam Ben Yedder	France	Sevilla	Levante	6–2	23 September 2018	
1304	Iago Aspas	Spain	Celta Vigo	Eibar	4–0	27 October 2018	
1305	Luis Suárez	Uruguay	Barcelona	Real Madrid	5–1	28 October 2018	
1306	Lionel Messi	Argentina	Barcelona	Levante	5–0	16 December 2018	
1307	Raúl de Tomás	Spain	Rayo Vallecano	Celta Vigo	4–2	11 January 2019	
1308	Youssef En-Nesyri	Morocco	Leganés	Real Betis	3–0	10 February 2019	
1309	Lionel Messi	Argentina	Barcelona	Sevilla	4–2	23 February 2019	
1310	Wissam Ben Yedder	France	Sevilla	Real Sociedad	5–2	10 March 2019	
1311	Lionel Messi	Argentina	Barcelona	Real Betis	4–1	17 March 2019	
1312	Karim Benzema	France	Real Madrid	Athletic Bilbao	3–0	21 April 2019	
1313	Lionel Messi	Argentina	Barcelona	Celta Vigo	4–1	9 November 2019	
1314	Lionel Messi	Argentina	Barcelona	Mallorca	5–2	7 December 2019	
1315	Joaquín	Spain	Real Betis	Athletic Bilbao	3–2	8 December 2019	
1316	Lionel Messi^{4}	Argentina	Barcelona	Eibar	5–0	22 February 2020	
1317	Carlos Soler	Spain	Valencia	Real Madrid	4–1	8 November 2020	
1318	Youssef En-Nesyri	Morocco	Sevilla	Real Sociedad	3–2	9 January 2021	
1319	Youssef En-Nesyri	Morocco	Sevilla	Cádiz	3–0	23 January 2021	
1320	Rafa Mir	Spain	Huesca	Valladolid	3–1	29 January 2021	
1321	Alexander Isak	Sweden	Real Sociedad	Alavés	4–0	21 February 2021	
1322	Gerard Moreno	Spain	Villarreal	Granada	3–0	3 April 2021	
1323	Kike García	Spain	Eibar	Alavés	3–0	1 May 2021	
1324	Carlos Bacca	Colombia	Villarreal	Sevilla	4–0	16 May 2021	
1325	Karim Benzema	France	Real Madrid	Celta Vigo	5–2	12 September 2021	
1326	Marco Asensio	Spain	Real Madrid	Mallorca	6–1	22 September 2021	
1327	Anthony Lozano	Honduras	Cádiz	Villarreal	3–3	26 October 2021	
1328	Juanmi	Spain	Real Betis	Levante	3–1	28 November 2021	
1329	Jorge Molina	Spain	Granada	Mallorca	4–1	19 December 2021	
1330	Oihan Sancet	Spain	Athletic Bilbao	Osasuna	3–1	3 January 2022	
1331	Arnaut Danjuma	Netherlands	Villarreal	Granada	4–1	19 February 2022	
1332	Pierre-Emerick Aubameyang	Gabon	Barcelona	Valencia	4–1	20 February 2022	
1333	Yéremy Pino^{4}	Spain	Villarreal	Espanyol	5–1	27 February 2022	
1334	Vinícius Júnior	Brazil	Real Madrid	Levante	6–0	12 May 2022	
1335	Oihan Sancet	Spain	Athletic Bilbao	Cádiz	4–1	3 February 2023	
1336	Pere Milla	Spain	Elche	Villarreal	3–1	4 February 2023	
1337	Karim Benzema	France	Real Madrid	Valladolid	6–0	2 April 2023	
1338	Taty Castellanos^{4}	Argentina	Girona	Real Madrid	4–2	25 April 2023	
1339	Karim Benzema	France	Real Madrid	Almería	4–2	29 April 2023	
1340	Lázaro	Brazil	Almería	Mallorca	3–0	20 May 2023	
1341	Luis Suárez	Colombia	Almería	Granada	3–3	1 October 2023	
1342	Antoine Griezmann	France	Atlético Madrid	Celta Vigo	3–0	21 October 2023	
1343	José Luis Morales	Spain	Villarreal	Osasuna	3–1	26 November 2023	
1344	Álvaro Morata	Spain	Atlético Madrid	Girona	3–4	3 January 2024	
1345	Ferran Torres	Spain	Barcelona	Real Betis	4–2	21 January 2024	
1346	Artem Dovbyk	Ukraine	Girona	Sevilla	5–1	21 January 2024	
1347	Alexander Sørloth	Norway	Villarreal	Granada	5–1	3 March 2024	
1348	Robert Lewandowski	Poland	Barcelona	Valencia	4–2	29 April 2024	
1349	Antoine Griezmann	France	Atlético Madrid	Getafe	3–0	15 May 2024	
1350	Alexander Sørloth^{4}	Norway	Villarreal	Real Madrid	4–4	19 May 2024	
1351	Artem Dovbyk	Ukraine	Girona	Granada	7–0	24 May 2024	
1352	Raphinha	Brazil	Barcelona	Valladolid	7–0	31 August 2024	
1353	Javi Puado	Spain	Espanyol	Alavés	3–2	14 September 2024	
1354	Robert Lewandowski	Poland	Barcelona	Alavés	3–0	6 October 2024	
1355	Vinícius Júnior	Brazil	Real Madrid	Osasuna	4–0	9 November 2024	
1356	Thierno Barry	France	Villarreal	Leganés	5–2	22 December 2024	
1357	Kike García	Spain	Alavés	Real Betis	3–1	18 January 2025	
1358	Kylian Mbappé	France	Real Madrid	Valladolid	3–0	25 January 2025	
1359	Oihan Sancet	Spain	Athletic Bilbao	Girona	3–0	8 February 2025	
1360	Borja Iglesias	Spain	Celta Vigo	Barcelona	3–4	19 April 2025	
1361	Alexander Sørloth^{4}	Norway	Atlético Madrid	Real Sociedad	4–0	10 May 2025	
1362	Kylian Mbappé	France	Real Madrid	Barcelona	3–4	11 May 2025	
1363	Alexander Sørloth†	Norway	Atlético Madrid	Girona	4–0	25 May 2025	
1364	Tajon Buchanan	Canada	Villarreal	Girona	5–0	24 August 2025	
1365	Julián Alvarez	Argentina	Atlético Madrid	Rayo Vallecano	3–2	24 September 2025	
1366	Robert Lewandowski	Poland	Barcelona	Celta Vigo	4–2	9 November 2025	
1367	Ferran Torres	Spain	Barcelona	Real Betis	5–3	6 December 2025	
1368	Gonzalo García	Spain	Real Madrid	Real Betis	5–1	4 January 2026	
1369	Vedat Muriqi	Kosovo	Mallorca	Athletic Bilbao	3–2	17 January 2026	
1370	Lamine Yamal	Spain	Barcelona	Villarreal	4–1	28 February 2026	
1371	Raphinha	Brazil	Barcelona	Sevilla	5–2	15 March 2026	
1372	Kylian Mbappé	France	Real Madrid	Real Sociedad	4–1	26 August 2026	
1373	Yassir Zabiri	Morocco	Racing Santander	Elche	3–2	28 August 2026	
1374	Lucas Boyé	Argentina	Alavés	Osasuna	5–2	6 September 2026	
1375	Raphinha	Brazil	Barcelona	Racing Santander	7–2	16 September 2026	
1376	Raphinha	Brazil	Barcelona	Sevilla	3–1	19 September 2026	

== Most hat-tricks ==
The following table lists the most hat-tricks among players who have scored ten or more. Boldface indicates a player who is currently active in La Liga. Italics indicates a player who is currently active outside of La Liga.

Rank	Player	Hat-tricks	Last hat-trick
1	(Argentina) Lionel Messi	36	22 February 2020
2	(Portugal) Cristiano Ronaldo	34	18 March 2018
3	(Spain) Telmo Zarra	23	15 March 1953
4	(Argentina) Alfredo Di Stéfano	22	15 March 1964
5	(Spain) Mundo	19	4 March 1951
6	(Spain) César Rodríguez	15	19 October 1952
7	(Spain) Isidro Lángara	13	15 December 1946
8	(Hungary) Ferenc Puskás	12	15 December 1963
9	(Spain) Pahiño	11	11 September 1955
9	(Spain) Manuel Badenes	11	29 March 1958
9	(Hungary) László Kubala	11	19 March 1961
12	(Spain) Quini	10	7 October 1981
12	(Uruguay) Luis Suárez	10	28 October 2018

== Hat-tricks by club ==
As of 19 September 2026

Club	Hat-tricks	Last hat-trick
Barcelona	201	19 September 2026
Real Madrid	200	26 August 2026
Athletic Bilbao	120	8 February 2025
Atlético Madrid	112	24 September 2025
Valencia	105	8 November 2020
Sevilla	86	23 January 2021
Espanyol	57	14 September 2024
Real Sociedad	49	21 February 2021
Celta Vigo	40	19 April 2025
Oviedo	40	13 June 1999
Deportivo A Coruña	32	30 March 2008
Zaragoza	32	25 April 2004
Racing Santander	31	28 August 2026
Valladolid	26	16 December 2013
Real Betis	26	28 November 2021
Sporting Gijón	23	22 January 2016
Villarreal	15	24 August 2025
Granada	14	19 December 2021
Osasuna	13	20 May 2007
Mallorca	12	17 January 2026
Las Palmas	10	4 December 1976
Murcia	10	26 February 1984
Rayo Vallecano	10	11 January 2019
Alavés	9	6 September 2026
Elche	9	4 February 2023
Málaga	7	3 October 2015
Arenas	6	19 February 1933
Tenerife	6	1 March 1997
CD Málaga	5	11 September 1983
Gimnàstic	5	30 January 1949
Real Unión	5	4 January 1931
Albacete	4	12 February 1995
Castellón	4	7 October 1990
Getafe	4	29 November 2009
Girona	4	24 May 2024
Hércules	4	14 January 1979
Levante	4	13 May 2018
Sabadell	4	3 October 1965
Salamanca	4	21 March 1998
Burgos	3	6 February 1977
Europa	3	30 March 1930
Alcoyano	2	4 March 1951
Almería	2	1 October 2023
Atlético Tetuán	2	20 January 1952
Cádiz	2	26 October 2021
Córdoba	2	17 March 1968
AD Almería	1	21 December 1980
Compostela	1	10 May 1998
Condal	1	2 February 1957
Cultural Leonesa	1	19 February 1956
Eibar	1	1 May 2021
Huesca	1	29 January 2021
Jaén	1	25 April 1954
Leganés	1	10 February 2019
Lleida	1	12 November 1950
Logroñés	1	7 October 1993
Numancia	1	4 November 2000
Pontevedra	1	15 March 1970

== See also ==
- Football records and statistics in Spain
- List of Bundesliga hat-tricks
- List of Ligue 1 hat-tricks
- List of Premier League hat-tricks
- List of Primeira Liga hat-tricks
- List of Serie A hat-tricks
