= Francisco Peralta =

Spanish archer (1943–2020)

Personal information
- Full name: Francisco Peralta Osorno
- Nationality: Spanish
- Born: 18 September 1943; Huelva, Spain
- Died: 18 March 2020 (aged 76)

Sport
- Sport: Archery

Francisco Peralta Osorno (18 September 1943 – 18 March 2020) was a Spanish archer. He competed in the men's individual event at the 1980 Summer Olympics.
