= 1929–30 Real Sociedad season =

Real Sociedad
1929–30 season
- President: Vicente Prado
- Manager: Benito Díaz
- La Liga: 7th
- King Alfonso XIII's Cup: Round of 16
- Top goalscorer: League: Cholín (10); All: Cholín (11)

The 1929–30 season was Real Sociedad's second season in La Liga.

== Squad ==
Note: Flags indicate national team as defined under FIFA eligibility rules; some limited exceptions apply. Players may hold more than one non-FIFA nationality.

No.	Pos.	Nation	Player
—	GK	ESP	Jesús Izaguirre
—	DF	ESP	Félix Ilundain
—	MF	ESP	Amadeo Labarta
—	FW	ESP	Belauste
—	DF	ESP	Deva
—	MF	ESP	Martín Marculeta
—	MF	ESP	Miguel Ayestaran
—	FW	ESP	Emilio Garmendia
—	FW	ESP	Domingo Zaldúa
—	DF	ESP	Ramón Orcolaga

No.	Pos.	Nation	Player
—	MF	ESP	Amado Murguía
—	MF	ESP	Trino
—	FW	ESP	Paco Bienzobas
—	FW	ESP	Kiriki
—	FW	ESP	Cholín
—	FW	ESP	Ángel Mariscal
—	FW	ESP	Bonifacio Ecenarro
—	FW	ESP	Mariano Yurrita
—	FW	ESP	Fernando López de Zubiría
—	GK	ESP	José Zubeldia

=== Squad stats ===
Squad stats
Player	Games played	Full games	Games starting	Used as sub	Minutes	Injuries	Cards	Sending-offs	Goals	Missed penalties
Amadeo Labarta	11	11	11	0	990	0	0	0	1	0
Miguel Ayestaran	17	17	17	0	1530	0	0	0	6	0
Belauste	6	6	6	0	540	0	0	0	3	0
Cholín	16	16	16	0	1440	0	0	0	10	0
Deva	7	7	7	0	630	0	0	0	0	0
Bonifacio Ecenarro	1	1	1	0	90	0	0	0	0	0
Félix Ilundain	15	15	15	0	1350	0	0	0	0	0
Jesús Izaguirre	18	18	18	0	1620	0	0	0	0	0
Kiriki	10	10	10	0	900	0	0	0	2	0
Martín Marculeta	18	18	18	0	1620	0	0	0	2	0
Ángel Mariscal	15	15	15	0	1350	0	0	0	1	0
Amado Murguía	3	3	3	0	270	0	0	0	0	0
Ramón Orcolaga	10	10	10	0	900	0	0	0	0	0
Paco Bienzobas	11	11	11	0	990	0	0	0	4	0
Trino	8	8	8	0	720	0	0	0	1	0
Mariano Yurrita	16	16	16	0	1440	0	0	0	3	0
Domingo Zaldúa	15	15	15	0	1350	0	0	0	0	0
Fernando López de Zubiría	1	1	1	0	90	0	0	0	0	0

== League ==
Win Draw Loss

1 December 1929 1	FC Barcelona	3–0	Real Sociedad	Barcelona
	Goiburu 12', 89'; Samitier 36'	(Report)		Stadium: Camp de Les Corts; Referee: Jaime Villena

8 December 1929 2	Real Sociedad	7–0	Racing Santander	San Sebastián
	Ayestaran 13'; Mariscal 30'; Kiriki 35', 37'; Cholín 58', 66', 72'	(Report)		Stadium: Atotxa Stadium; Referee: Agustín Cruella

15 December 1929 3	Athletic Bilbao	2–2	Real Sociedad	Bilbao
	Unamuno 63'; Zaldúa 14' (o.g.)	(Report)	2', 44' Ayestaran	Stadium: San Mamés Stadium; Referee: Ramón Melcón

22 December 1929 4	Real Sociedad	4–0	Real Madrid	San Sebastián
	Belauste 1', 73'; Ayestaran 41', 68'	(Report)		Stadium: Atotxa Stadium; Referee: José María Steimborn

29 December 1929 5	CE Europa	3–2	Real Sociedad	Barcelona
	Alcázar 20', 71'; Gironés 30'	(Report)	77' Trino; 83' Cholín	Stadium: Camp del Guinardó; Referee: Ramón Melcón

5 January 1930 6	Real Sociedad	4–4	Arenas Club de Getxo	San Sebastián
	Ayestaran 25'; Cholín 28'; Labarta 43'; Urresti 83' (o.g.)	(Report)	8' Rivero; 42', 48' Gurruchaga; 83' o.g Ilundain	Stadium: Atotxa Stadium; Referee: Santiago Ledesma

12 January 1930 7	Atlético Madrid	1–1	Real Sociedad	Madrid
	Sabater 85'	(Report)	75' Yurrita	Stadium: Estadio Metropolitano de Madrid; Referee: Ramón Melcón

19 January 1930 8	Real Sociedad	2–3	Real Unión	San Sebastián
	Cholín 10'; Bienzobas 70' (pen.)	(Report)	15', 77' Regueiro; 61' Garmendia	Stadium: Atotxa Stadium; Referee: Santiago Ledesma

26 January 1930 9	Real Sociedad	1–0	RDC Espanyol	San Sebastián
	Marculeta 86'	(Report)		Stadium: Atotxa Stadium; Referee: José María Steimborn

2 February 1930 10	Real Sociedad	1–2	FC Barcelona	San Sebastián
	Cholín 13'	(Report)	18' Goiburu; 25' Diego	Stadium: Atotxa Stadium; Referee: José Barrena

9 February 1930 11	Racing Santander	2–0	Real Sociedad	Santander
	Baragaño 55'; Cladera 67'	(Report)		Stadium: El Sardinero; Referee: José María Navaz

16 February 1930 12	Real Sociedad	1–7	Athletic Bilbao	San Sebastián
	Cholín 16'	(Report)	19', 57', 66' Gorostiza; 21', 28', 52' Iraragorri; 59' Unamuno	Stadium: Atotxa Stadium; Referee: Pedro Escartín

23 February 1930 13	Real Madrid	1–1	Real Sociedad	Madrid
	Cominges 13'	(Report)	17' Marculeta	Stadium: Estadio Chamartín; Referee: José María Navaz

2 March 1930 14	Real Sociedad	2–0	CE Europa	San Sebastián
	Cholín 14'; Yurrita 79'	(Report)		Stadium: Atotxa Stadium; Referee: Ramón Melcón

9 March 1930 15	Arenas Club de Getxo	3–1	Real Sociedad	Getxo
	Gurruchaga 43', 56'; Menchaca 75'	(Report)	22' Yurrita	Stadium: Ibaiondo; Referee: Larracoechea

16 March 1930 16	Real Sociedad	2–0	Atlético Madrid	San Sebastián
	Bienzobas 7'; Cholín 58'	(Report)		Stadium: Atotxa Stadium; Referee: Comorera Gatuellas

23 March 1930 17	Real Unión	3–2	Real Sociedad	Irun
	Urtizberea 10'; Regueiro 18'; Zaldúa 21' (o.g.)	(Report)	54', 76' Bienzobas	Stadium: Stadium Gal; Referee: Agustín Cruella

30 March 1930 18	RDC Espanyol	3–1	Real Sociedad	Barcelona
	Zamoreta 3'; José Padrón 68', 87'	(Report)	56' Belauste	Stadium: Estadi de Sarrià; Referee: Comorera Gatuellas

== Final table ==
Position	Club	Played	W	D	L	GF	GA	Points	GD	Comments
1	Athletic Bilbao	18	11	0	7	73	33	22	+40	Champion of La Liga
2	Racing Santander	18	10	2	6	49	37	22	+12	Torneo de la Exposición Colonial
3	Real Sociedad	18	10	2	6	42	39	22	+3	
4	FC Barcelona	18	7	7	4	40	43	21	-3	

== King Alfonso XIII's Cup ==
=== Round of 32 ===
7 April 1930	Real Sociedad	2–0	Gimnástica de Torrelavega	San Sebastián
	Ángel Mariscal Beuba 10', 55'	Report		Stadium: Atotxa; Referee: Olarecoechea

14 April 1930	Gimnástica de Torrelavega	0–2 (0–4 agg.)	Real Sociedad	Santander
		Report1; Report2	66' Kiriki; 89' Bienzobas	Referee: Olarecoechea

=== Round of 16 ===
21 April 1930	Athletic Bilbao	4–1	Real Sociedad	Bilbao
	Chirri II; Gorostiza pen.' Iraragorri; Unamuno; Cartarios (red card)	Report	(red card) Cholin	Stadium: Sán Mamés; Referee: Agustín Cruella

27 April 1930	Real Sociedad	1–1 (2–5 agg.)	Athletic Bilbao	San Sebastián
	Urquizu 52' (o.g.)	Report1; Report2	25' Gorostiza	Stadium: Atotxa; Referee: Ramón Melcón
