= 1929–30 FC Barcelona season =

31st season in existence of FC Barcelona

Barcelona
1929–30 season
- President: Tomàs Rosés
- Manager: Jim Bellamy
- Stadium: Les Corts
- La Liga: 2nd
- Catalan League: Winners
- Copa del Rey: Semi-finals
- Top goalscorer: League: Ángel Arocha (11); All: Ángel Arocha (22)

The 1929–30 season is FC Barcelona's 31st in existence, and was their second year in the Primera División, and covers the period from 1929-08-01 to 1930-07-31.

FC Barcelona won the Catalan League for the 16th time, their only title in the season.

== First-team squad ==
Note: Flags indicate national team as defined under FIFA eligibility rules; some limited exceptions apply. Players may hold more than one non-FIFA nationality.

No.	Pos.	Nation	Player
—	GK	ESP	Ramón Llorens
—	GK	ESP	Juan Uriach
—	GK	ESP	Cristóbal Solà
—	GK	HUN	Ferenc Plattkó
—	DF	ESP	Vicente Saura
—	DF	ESP	Cristóbal Martí
—	DF	ESP	Ramón Zabalo
—	DF	ESP	Enrique Mas
—	DF	ESP	Patricio Arnau
—	DF	ESP	Esteban Pedrol
—	DF	GER	Emil Walter
—	MF	ESP	Severiano Goiburu
—	MF	ESP	Domingo Carulla

No.	Pos.	Nation	Player
—	MF	ESP	Fernando Diego
—	MF	ESP	Carlos Bestit
—	MF	ESP	Juan Font
—	MF	ESP	Ramón Guzmán
—	MF	ESP	José Sastre
—	MF	ESP	Vicente Piera
—	MF	ESP	José Carlos Castillo
—	FW	ESP	Josep Samitier
—	FW	ESP	Manuel Parera
—	FW	ESP	Juan Ramón
—	FW	ESP	Ángel Arocha
—	FW	ESP	Antonio García
—	FW	ESP	Manuel García

== Transfers ==
=== In ===
Note: Flags indicate national team as defined under FIFA eligibility rules; some limited exceptions apply. Players may hold more than one non-FIFA nationality.

No.	Pos.	Nation	Player
—	MF	ESP	Carlos Bestit (from Europa)
—	MF	ESP	Severiano Goiburu
—	MF	ESP	Fernando Diego
—	DF	ESP	Enrique Mas
—	DF	ESP	Ramón Zabalo
—	MF	ESP	Juan Font
—	MF	ESP	Domingo Carulla
—	FW	ESP	Manuel García
—	GK	ESP	Cristóbal Solà (from Espanyol)

=== Out ===
Note: Flags indicate national team as defined under FIFA eligibility rules; some limited exceptions apply. Players may hold more than one non-FIFA nationality.

No.	Pos.	Nation	Player
—	GK	ESP	Manuel Vidal
—	MF	ESP	José Obiols (to Europa)
—	FW	ESP	Emilio Sagi Liñán
—	FW	ESP	Ramón Campabadal
—	DF	ESP	Andrés Bosch
—	DF	ESP	Francesc Bussot
—	MF	ESP	Ramón Parera

== Competitions ==
=== La Liga ===
==== League table ====
Pos	Team	Pld	W	D	L	GF	GA	GD	Pts
1	Athletic Bilbao	18	12	6	0	63	28	+35	30
2	Barcelona	18	11	1	6	46	36	+10	23
3	Arenas Club	18	9	2	7	51	40	+11	20

==== Results by round ====
Round	1	2	3	4	5	6	7	8	9	10	11	12	13	14	15	16	17	18
Ground	H	A	H	H	A	H	H	A	H	A	H	A	A	H	A	A	H	A
Result	W	W	W	W	W	W	D	L	L	W	W	W	L	W	L	L	W	L
Position	2	1	1	1	1	1	1	1	2	2	2	2	2	2	2	2	2	2

Source: Competitive matches
A = Away; H = Home; W = Win; D = Draw; L = Loss

==== Matches ====
1 December 1929 1	Barcelona	3–0	Real Sociedad	Barcelona
	Goiburu 12', 89'; Samitier 36'	Report		Stadium: Les Corts; Referee: Villena

8 December 1929 2	Arenas Club	1–3	Barcelona	Getxo
	Yermo 35'	Report	Bestit 41'; Arocha 60', 72'	Stadium: Ibaiondo; Referee: Steimborn Ludeuvik

15 December 1929 3	Barcelona	2–1	Europa	Barcelona
	Samitier 30', 43'	Report	Bestit II 10'	Stadium: Les Corts; Referee: Quintana

22 December 1929 4	Barcelona	5–0	Racing de Santander	Barcelona
	Arocha 16', 34', 85'; Piera 48', 80'	Report		Stadium: Les Corts; Referee: Areces

29 December 1929 5	Real Unión	1–3	Barcelona	Irun
	Regueiro 89' (pen.)	Report	Arocha 4', 70'; Bestit 77'	Stadium: Gal; Referee: Escartín Morán

5 January 1930 6	Barcelona	4–2	Atlético Madrid	Barcelona
	Sastre 44', 53'; Bestit 50', 62'	Report	Costa 16', 65'	Stadium: Les Corts; Referee: Steimborn Ludeuvik

12 January 1930 7	Barcelona	1–1	Athletic Bilbao	Barcelona
	Piera 17'	Report	Gorostiza 77'	Stadium: Les Corts; Referee: Quintana

19 January 1930 8	Espanyol	4–0	Barcelona	Barcelona
	Gallart 18', 26', 67'; Ventolrà 39'	Report		Stadium: Sarrià; Referee: Escartín Morán

26 January 1930 9	Barcelona	1–4	Real Madrid	Barcelona
	Bestit 63'	Report	Rubio 10', 37'; López 17'; Lazcano 71'	Stadium: Les Corts; Referee: Quintero

2 February 1930 10	Real Sociedad	1–2	Barcelona	San Sebastián
	Cholín 13'	Report	Goiburu 18'; Diego 25'	Stadium: Atotxa; Referee: Barrena

9 February 1930 11	Barcelona	3–1	Arenas	Barcelona
	Arocha 16'; García 37'; Bestit 80'	Report	Mentxaka 42'	Stadium: Les Corts; Referee: Barrena

16 February 1930 12	Europa	0–3	Barcelona	Barcelona
		Report	García 7', 31'; Goiburu 73'	Stadium: El Ginardó; Referee: Arribas Seijas

23 February 1930 13	Racing de Santander	2–1	Barcelona	Santander
	Larrinaga 77', 85'	Report	Parera 36'	Stadium: El Sardinero; Referee: Steimborn Ludeuvik

2 March 1930 14	Barcelona	4–2	Real Unión	Barcelona
	Bestit 39'; Arocha 60', 80'; Sastre 83'	Report	Urtizberea 51', 54'	Stadium: Les Corts; Referee: Escartín Morán

9 March 1930 15	Atlético Madrid	3–2	Barcelona	Madrid
	Ordóñez 3'; Costa 42' (pen.), 73' (pen.)	Report	Piera 20'; Goiburu 25'	Stadium: Metropolitano; Referee: Barrena

16 March 1930 16	Athletic Bilbao	4–3	Barcelona	Bilbao
	Chirri II 1'; Gorostiza 16', 82'; Lafuente 25'	Report	Diego 35'; Arocha 37'; Bestit 38'	Stadium: San Mamés; Referee: Ramón Men

23 March 1930 17	Barcelona	5–4	Español	Barcelona
	Goiburu 14', 35'; Diego 32'; Bestit 85'; Martí 87'	Report	Solé 12' (pen.); Padrón 21'; Gallart 68'; Ventolrà 70'	Stadium: Les Corts; Referee: Escartín Morán

30 March 1930 18	Real Madrid	5–1	Barcelona	Madrid
	Rubio 5', 23'; Lazcano 42', 68', 72'	Report	Goiburu 84'	Stadium: Chamartín; Referee: Steimborn Ludeuvik

=== Copa del Rey ===
==== Round of 32 ====
6 April 1930 First leg	Barcelona	8–0	Deportivo La Coruña	Barcelona
	Arocha; Bestit; Goiburu; Guzmán			Stadium: Les Corts

13 April 1930 Second leg	Deportivo La Coruña	1–3	Barcelona	A Coruña
			Samitier; Goiburu	Stadium: Riazor

==== Round of 16 ====
20 April 1930 First leg	Real Betis	1–1	Barcelona	Seville
			Arocha	Stadium: Benito Villamarín

27 April 1930 Second leg	Barcelona	2–0	Real Betis	Barcelona
	Tenorio (o.g); Samitier			Stadium: Les Corts

==== Quarterfinals ====
4 May 1930 First leg	Alavés	2–1	Barcelona	Vitoria-Gasteiz
			Samitier	Stadium: Mendizorrotza

11 May 1930 Second leg	Barcelona	4–1	Alavés	Barcelona
	Arnau; Piera; Samitier			Stadium: Les Corts

==== Semifinals ====
18 May 1930 First leg	Athletic Bilbao	2–1	Barcelona	Bilbao
			Ramón	Stadium: San Mamés Stadium

25 May 1930 Second leg	Barcelona	4–3	Athletic Bilbao	Barcelona
	Samitier; Goiburu; Ramón			Stadium: Les Corts

27 May 1930 Tie-breaker	Barcelona	0–4	Athletic Bilbao	Zaragoza

=== Catalan football championship ===
==== League table ====
Pos	Team	Pld	W	D	L	GF	GA	GD	Pts
1	Barcelona	10	8	0	2	33	6	+27	16
2	Espanyol	10	7	0	3	33	15	+18	14
3	Europa	10	5	1	4	21	25	–4	11

==== Matches ====
22 September 1929 1	Barcelona	5–0	UE Sants	Barcelona
	Arocha; Goiburu			Stadium: Les Corts

29 September 1929 2	Júpiter	0–1	Barcelona	Barcelona
			Samitier	Stadium: La Vernenda

6 October 1929 3	Barcelona	4–0	Europa	Barcelona
	Arocha; Parera; Goiburu			Stadium: Les Corts

13 October 1929 4	Barcelona	1–3	Badalona	Barcelona
	Diego			Stadium: Les Corts

20 October 1929 5	Espanyol	1–0	Barcelona	Barcelona
				Stadium: Sarrià

27 October 1929 6	Sants	0–3	Barcelona	Barcelona
			Parera; Sastre; Goiburu	Stadium: La Magòria

3 November 1929 7	Barcelona	4–0	Júpiter	Barcelona
	Parera; Guzmán; Arocha			Stadium: Les Corts

10 November 1929 8	Europa	0–4	Barcelona	Barcelona
			Walter; Sastre; Arnau; Parera

17 November 1929 9	Badalona	0–8	Barcelona	Badalona
			Piera; Sastre; Samitier; Parera; Bestit; Guzmán

24 November 1929 10	Barcelona	3–2	Espanyol	Barcelona
	Sastre; Bestit			Stadium: Les Corts

== Friendlies ==
Friendlies
Kick Off	Opponents	H / A	Result	Scorers
September 8, 1929	(Spain) Badalona	A	0–1	Arocha
September 9, 1929	(Spain) Alfonso XIII	A	1–3	Castillo, Goiburu, Camps (o.g)
September 10, 1929	(Spain) Alfonso XIII	A	0–2	Goiburu, Ramón
September 15, 1929	(Spain) Europa	H	1–4	Sastre
September 23, 1929	(Spain) Real Sociedad	H	3–0	Goiburu, Samiter, García
October 31, 1929	(Spain) Girona	A	0–1	Ramón
November 1, 1929	(Spain) Castellón	H	4–1	Parera (2), Ramón, Seman
November 12, 1929	(Spain) FC Martinenc	A	1–4	Fernandez, Pedrol, Ramón, Barcons (o.g)
December 25, 1929	(Austria) Admira	H	2–2	Samitier, Sastre
December 26, 1929	(Austria) Admira	H	2–2	Arocha (2)
January 6, 1930	(Czechoslovakia) Slavia Prague	H	6–3	Arocha, Goiburu, Parera (2), Diego, Garcia
January 22, 1930	(Spain) Valencia	A	0–2	Campabadal, Arnau
February 2, 1930	(Spain) Badalona	H	4–1	F.Garcia, Samitier, Campabadal, Sastre
February 23, 1930	(France) Red Star	A	6–3	Bestit, Goiburu I, Arocha
March 16, 1930	(Spain) Badalona	A	2–0	
March 19, 1930	(Spain) Alavés	H	4–0	Seman, Bestit (2), Arocha
March 25, 1930	(Spain) Sants	H	9–0	Seman, Ramón (4), Campabadal (2), Arnau, Traité
March 30, 1930	(Spain) Patria de Zaragoza	H	4–3	Campabadal (4)
March 30, 1930	(Spain) Levante	H	9–0	Ramón (2), Diego (2), Semán (3), A. García, Arnau
May 1, 1930	(Spain) Júpiter	H	3–2	Ramón, M. Garcia, Font
May 29, 1930	(Spain) Arenas	H	6–2	Arocha (2), Parera, Bestit (2), Ramón
June 9, 1930	(Spain) Valencia	H	3–2	Arocha (2), Parera
June 15, 1930	(Spain) Cartagena	H	3–1	Ramón, Arocha, Parera
June 19, 1930	(Spain) Europa	H	3–1	Arocha (2), Seman
June 22, 1930	(France) Red Star	H	5–2	Arocha (3), Ramón, Diego
June 24, 1930	(France) Red Star	H	2–0	Arocha, Seman
July 29, 1930	(Spain) Athletic Bilbao	H	3–1	Piera, Samitier, Goiburu

== Results ==
Friendly

4 September 1929	EC Granollers	0–2	FC Barcelona	Barcelona
			Arnau	Stadium: Granollers

8 September 1929	CF Badalona	0–1	FC Barcelona	Barcelona
			Arocha	Stadium: Badalona; Referee: Llovera

9 September 1929	Alfonso XIII	1–3	FC Barcelona	Mallorca
			Castillo; Goiburu	Stadium: Buenos Aires; Referee: Joaquin Llauger

10 September 1929	Alfonso XIII	0–2	FC Barcelona	Mallorca
			Ramon; Goiburu	Stadium: Buenos Aires; Referee: Joaquin Llauger

10 September 1929	UE Tàrrega	2–6	FC Barcelona	Barcelona
			Arocha; Samitier; Diego	Stadium: Tarrega

15 September 1929	FC Barcelona	1–4	CE Europa	Barcelona
	Sastre			Stadium: Les Corts; Referee: Vilalta

24 September 1929	FC Barcelona	3–0	Real Sociedad	Barcelona
	Parera; Samitier; Goiburu			Stadium: Les Corts; Referee: Comorera

24 September 1929	Cervera	v	FC Barcelona	Cervera

31 October 1929	UD Girona	0–1	FC Barcelona	Girona
			Ramon 15'	Stadium: Camp de Vista Alegre; Referee: Santiago

1 November 1929	FC Barcelona	4–1	CD Castelló	Barcelona
	Parera 10' 50'; Ramon 65'; Seman 80'			Stadium: Les Corts; Referee: Pons

12 November 1929	FC Martinenc	1–4	FC Barcelona	Barcelona
			Fernandez 25'; Barcons equip contrari 55'; Perol 70'; Ramon 85'	Stadium: Martinenc; Referee: Llovera

21 December 1929	FC Barcelona	4–1	Athletic Club	Barcelona
	Seman; Ramon; Diego			Stadium: Les Corts; Referee: Pequera

25 December 1929	FC Barcelona	2–2	Admira	Barcelona
	Samitier 28'; Sastre 43'			Stadium: Les Corts; Referee: Villena

26 December 1929	FC Barcelona	2–2	Admira	Barcelona
	Arocha 48' 74'			Stadium: Les Corts; Referee: Comorera

6 January 1930	FC Barcelona	6–3	SK Slavia Praha	Barcelona
	Arocha; Goiburu; Parera; Diego; M.Garcia			Stadium: Les Corts; Referee: Steimborn

22 January 1930	València CF	0–2	FC Barcelona	València
			Campabadal 16'; Arnau 52'	Stadium: Mestalla; Referee: Leonarte

2 February 1930 Copa FC Barcelona	FC Barcelona	4–1	CF Badalona	Barcelona
	A.Garcia; Sastre; Samitier; Campabadal			Stadium: Les Corts; Referee: Planell

15 February 1930 Copa FC Barcelona	CE Júpiter	3–3	FC Barcelona	Barcelona
			Campabadal 12' 74'; Ramon 60'	Stadium: Poble Nou; Referee: Vilalta

16 February 1930 Copa FC Barcelona	UE Sants	2–3	FC Barcelona	Barcelona
			Buj; Ramon	Stadium: Sants; Referee: Santure

23 February 1930	Red Star FC	6–3	FC Barcelona	París
			Bestit 35'; Goiburu I 43'; Arocha 80'	Stadium: Buffalo; Attendance: 20.000; Referee: Gerber

9 March 1930 Copa FC Barcelona	FC Barcelona	9–1	UE Sants	Barcelona
	Carulla 1' 10'; Arocha 4' 20' 42' 47' 55' 68'; Seman 88'			Stadium: Les Corts; Referee: Espelta

16 March 1930 Copa FC barcelona	CF Badalona	2–0	FC Barcelona	Barcelona
				Stadium: Badalona; Referee: Santore

19 March 1930	FC Barcelona	4–0	Deportivo Alavés	Barcelona
	Seman; Bestit; Arocha			Stadium: Les Corts; Referee: Coll

25 March 1930	FC Barcelona	9–0	UE Sants	Barcelona
	Seman; Ramon; Campabadal; Arnau; Traite			Stadium: Les Corts; Referee: Comorera

30 March 1930	FC Barcelona	4–3	Patria	Barcelona
	Campabadal			Stadium: Les Corts; Referee: Villena

21 April 1930	FC Barcelona	9–0	Levante UD	Barcelona
	Ramon; Diego; Seman; A.Garcia; Arnau			Stadium: Les Corts; Referee: Cambra

1 May 1930 Copa FC Barcelona	FC Barcelona	3–2	CE Júpiter	Barcelona
	Ramon; M.Garcia; Font			Stadium: Les Corts; Referee: Comorera

3 May 1930	UE Figueres	1–1	FC Barcelona	Barcelona
			Campabadal	Stadium: Figueres; Referee: Olamendi

11 May 1930	FC Barcelona	4–3	FC Gràcia	Barcelona
	Calvo; Seman; Pedrol			Stadium: Les Corts

29 May 1930	FC Barcelona	6–2	Arenas	Barcelona
	Arocha; Parera; Bestit; Ramon			Stadium: Les Corts; Referee: Villena

9 June 1930	FC Barcelona	3–2	València CF	Barcelona
	Arocha; Parera			Stadium: Les Corts; Referee: Marine

15 June 1930	FC Barcelona	3–1	Cartagena FC	Barcelona
	Ramon 55'; Arocha 60'; Parera 85'			Stadium: Les Corts; Referee: Arribas

15 June 1930	FC Barcelona	8–0	UE Tàrrega	Barcelona
	Goiburu II; Campabadal; Seman; A.Garcia			Stadium: Les Corts

15 June 1930	FC Santboià	3–1	FC Barcelona	Barcelona
			Samitier	Stadium: Sant Boi; Referee: Quirico Pares

19 June 1930	FC Barcelona	4–0	Reus Deportiu	Barcelona
	U.Garcia; A.Garcia; Buj; M.Garcia			Stadium: Les Corts

19 June 1930	FC Barcelona	3–1	CE Europa	Barcelona
	Arocha; Seman			Stadium: Les Corts; Referee: Arribas

22 June 1930	FC Barcelona	5–2	Red Star FC	Barcelona
	Arocha; Ramon; Diego			Stadium: Les Corts; Referee: Villena

24 June 1930	FC Barcelona	2–0	Red Star FC	Barcelona
	Arocha 28'; Seman 70'			Stadium: Les Corts; Referee: Pequera

29 June 1930	FC Barcelona	3–1	Athletic Club	Barcelona
	Piera; Samitier; Goiburu			Stadium: Les Corts; Referee: Comorera

21 July 1930	FC Palafrugell	3–2	FC Barcelona	Barcelona
			Samitier; Ramon	Stadium: Palafrugell

29 July 1930	Reus Deportiu	2–4	FC Barcelona	Barcelona
			A.Garcia; Traite; Goiburu II; Buj	Stadium: Reus
