= 1928–29 FC Barcelona season =

30th season in existence of FC Barcelona

Barcelona
1928–29 season
- President: Arcadi Balaguer (until March 23, 1929); Tomàs Rosés (from March 23, 1929)
- Manager: Romà Forns (dates 1–6); Jim Bellamy (dates 7–18)
- Stadium: Les Corts
- La Liga: Winners
- Catalan League: 3rd
- Copa del Rey: Semi-finals
- Top goalscorer: League: Manuel Parera (11); All: Ángel Arocha (20)

The 1928–29 season is FC Barcelona's 30th in existence, and was their first year in the Primera División, and covers the period from 1928-07-01 to 1929-06-30.

FC Barcelona won the first Liga title ever, and it was their only title of the year.

== First-team squad ==
Note: Flags indicate national team as defined under FIFA eligibility rules; some limited exceptions apply. Players may hold more than one non-FIFA nationality.

No.	Pos.	Nation	Player
—	GK	ESP	Ramón Llorens
—	GK	ESP	Juan Uriach
—	GK	ESP	Manuel Vidal
—	GK	HUN	Ferenc Plattkó
—	DF	ESP	Andrés Bosch
—	DF	ESP	Vicente Saura
—	DF	GER	Emil Walter
—	DF	ESP	Cristóbal Martí
—	DF	ESP	Francesc Bussot
—	DF	ESP	Patricio Arnau
—	DF	ESP	Esteban Pedrol
—	MF	ESP	José Obiols

No.	Pos.	Nation	Player
—	MF	ESP	Ramón Parera
—	MF	ESP	Ramón Guzmán
—	MF	ESP	Vicente Piera
—	MF	ESP	José Sastre
—	FW	ESP	José Carlos Castillo
—	FW	ESP	Juan Ramón
—	FW	ESP	Ángel Arocha
—	FW	ESP	Emilio Sagi Liñán
—	FW	ESP	Antonio García
—	FW	ESP	Manuel Parera
—	FW	ESP	Ramón Campabadal
—	FW	ESP	Josep Samitier

== Competitions ==
=== La Liga ===
==== League table ====
Pos	Team	Pld	W	D	L	GF	GA	GD	Pts
1	Barcelona	18	11	3	4	37	23	+14	25
2	Real Madrid	18	11	1	6	40	27	+13	23
3	Athletic	18	8	4	6	43	33	+10	20

==== Results by round ====
Round	1	2	3	4	5	6	7	8	9	10	11	12	13	14	15	16	17	18
Ground	A	H	A	H	A	H	A	H	A	H	A	A	H	H	A	H	A	H
Result	W	L	L	D	L	W	L	W	W	W	W	W	W	W	D	W	D	W
Position	2	5	6	7	8	8	9	7	6	4	5	2	1	1	1	1	2	1

Source: Competitive matches
A = Away; H = Home; W = Win; D = Draw; L = Loss

==== Matches ====
12 February 1929 1	Racing de Santander	0–2	Barcelona	Santander
		Report	Parera 53', 87'	Stadium: El Sardinero; Referee: Ramón Mel

17 February 1929 2	Barcelona	1–2	Real Madrid	Barcelona
	Parera 70'	Report	Morera 10', 55'	Stadium: Les Corts; Referee: Steimborn Ludeuvik

24 February 1929 3	Real Sociedad	3–0	Barcelona	San Sebastián
	Kiriki 18'; Bienzobas 42'; Cholín 52'	Report		Stadium: Atotxa; Referee: Quintana

3 March 1929 4	Barcelona	2–2	Arenas	Barcelona
	García 1'; Walter 67'	Report	Yermo 15', 18'	Stadium: Les Corts; Referee: Insausti

10 March 1929 5	Atlético Madrid	4–1	Barcelona	Madrid
	Cosme 5', 30'; Yllera 50', 60'	Report	Parera 70'	Stadium: Metropolitano; Referee: Murguía

24 March 1929 6	Barcelona	5–2	Europa	Barcelona
	Campabadal 18'; Sastre 31', 51', 62'; Parera 40'	Report	Cros 71', 82'	Stadium: Les Corts; Referee: Murguía

31 March 1929 7	Athletic Bilbao	5–1	Barcelona	Bilbao
	Unamuno 43', 56'; Graciano 64'; Lafuente 78', 87'	Report	Parera 71'	Stadium: San Mamés; Referee: Ramón Mel

7 April 1929 8	Barcelona	1–0	Español	Barcelona
	Sastre 80'	Report		Stadium: Les Corts; Referee: Escartín Morán

21 April 1929 9	Real Unión	1–2	Barcelona	Irun
	Urtizberea 7'	Report	Arocha 62'; Samitier 72'	Stadium: Gal; Referee: Navaz

28 April 1929 10	Barcelona	5–1	Racing de Santander	Barcelona
	Parera 23'; Arocha 25', 51', 55'; Walter 75' (pen.)	Report	Óscar 46'	Stadium: Les Corts; Referee: Murguía

9 May 1929 11	Real Madrid	0–1	Barcelona	Madrid
		Report	Sastre 83'	Stadium: Chamartín; Referee: Menchaca

26 May 1929 13	Barcelona	4–0	Atlético Madrid	Barcelona
	Sastre 10'; Samitier 43', 81'; Walter 58'	Report		Stadium: Les Corts; Referee: Comorera Gatue

30 May 1929 14	Barcelona	1–0	Real Sociedad	Barcelona
	Samitier 43'	Report		Stadium: Montjuic; Referee: Escartín Morán

2 June 1929 15	Europa	1–1	Barcelona	Barcelona
	Ramonzuelo 33'	Report	Samitier 24'	Stadium: Montjuic; Referee: Menchaca

9 June 1929 16	Barcelona	3–0	Athletic Bilbao	Barcelona
	Samitier 57', 59'; Sastre 86'	Report		Stadium: Montjuic; Referee: Escartín Morán

16 June 1929 17	Español	1–1	Barcelona	Barcelona
	Juvé 54'	Report	Sastre 89'	Stadium: Montjuic; Referee: Escartín Morán

23 June 1929 18	Barcelona	4–1	Real Unión	Barcelona
	Sastre 15', 61'; Parera 27', 74'	Report	Urtizberea 42'	Stadium: Les Corts; Referee: Areces

30 June 1929 12	Arenas	0–2	Barcelona	Getxo
		Report	Parera 67', 84'	Stadium: Ibaiondo; Referee: Escartín Morán

=== Copa del Rey ===
==== Round of 32 ====
9 December 1928 First leg	Barcelona	7–1	Racing de Santander	Barcelona
	Arocha; Samitier; Sagi; García			Stadium: Les Corts

16 December 1928 Second leg	Racing de Santander	2–2	Barcelona	Santander
			Samitier	Stadium: El Sardinero

==== Round of 16 ====
23 December 1928 First leg	Barcelona	6–0	Real Sociedad	Barcelona
	Arocha; Sagi			Stadium: Les Corts

30 December 1928 Second leg	Real Sociedad	0–0	Barcelona	San Sebastián
				Stadium: Atotxa

==== Quarterfinals ====
6 January 1929 First leg	Sevilla	0–1	Barcelona	Seville
			Samitier

13 January 1929 Second leg	Barcelona	2–0	Sevilla	Barcelona
	Arnau; Arocha			Stadium: Les Corts

==== Semifinals ====
20 January 1929 First leg	Español	2–0	Barcelona	Barcelona
				Stadium: Montjuic

27 January 1929 Second leg	Barcelona	1–1	Español	Barcelona
			Saprissa (o.g.)	Stadium: Les Corts

=== Catalan football championship ===
==== League table ====
Pos	Team	Pld	W	D	L	GF	GA	GD	Pts
2	Europa	10	4	5	1	23	8	+15	13
3	Barcelona	10	5	2	3	23	13	+10	12
4	Sants	10	3	2	5	18	20	–2	8

==== Matches ====
30 September 1928 1	UE Sants	2–2	Barcelona	Barcelona
			Arocha	Stadium: La Magòria

7 October 1928 2	Sabadell	0–5	Barcelona	Sabadell
			Sastre; Ramón; Walter	Stadium: Creu Alta

14 October 1928 3	Terrassa	0–4	Barcelona	Terrassa
			Arocha; Parera; Sagi

21 October 1928 4	Barcelona	0–2	Español	Barcelona
				Stadium: Les Corts

28 October 1928 5	Europa	2–2	Barcelona	Barcelona
			Arocha; Ramón

4 November 1928 6	Barcelona	2–1	Sants	Barcelona
	Ramón; Arocha			Stadium: Les Corts

11 November 1928 7	Barcelona	4–1	Sabadell	Barcelona
	Ramón; Parera; García			Stadium: Les Corts

18 November 1928 8	Barcelona	3–1	Terrassa	Barcelona
	Arocha; Samitier; Sastre			Stadium: Les Corts

25 November 1928 9	Español	2–1	Barcelona	Barcelona
			Samitier	Stadium: Montjuic

2 December 1928 10	Barcelona	0–2	Europa	Barcelona
				Stadium: Les Corts

== Friendlies ==
Friendlies
Kick Off	Opponents	H / A	Result	Scorers
September 23, 1928	(Italy) Torino	H	0–5	
September 24, 1928	(Italy) Torino	H	0–4	
November 1, 1928	(Spain) Zaragoza	H	7–3	Arocha (4), Ramón (2), Parera
December 25, 1928	(Hungary) Ferencvárosi	H	4–0	Cros (3), Buj
December 26, 1928	(Hungary) Ferencvárosi	H	3–3	Parera (2), Cros
December 31, 1928	(Spain) Racing de Ferrol	H	2–7	Barcelo (2)
February 2, 1929	(Argentina) Sportivo Barracas	H	2–1	Arocha, García
February 7, 1929	(Argentina) Sportivo Barracas	H	3–2	Campabadal (2), García
March 17, 1929	(Argentina) Sportivo Barracas	H	1–2	Campabadal
March 19, 1929	(Spain) Alavés	A	0–3	
April 17, 1929	(England) Vaixell Anglés	H	5–0	
April 21, 1929	(Spain) Europa	H	5–3	
May 5, 1929	(Spain) Figueres	A	1–5	Ramón, Sastre (2), Buj, Sagi
May 6, 1929	(Spain) Figueres	A	0–2	Serra, Buj
July 21, 1929	(Spain) Palafrugell	A	2–6	Arnau (3), Ramón, Sastre, Cabanes (o.g.)

== Results ==
Friendly

2 September 1928	Terrassa FC	1–1	FC Barcelona	Barcelona
				Stadium: Terrassa

9 September 1928	CE Júpiter	2–1	FC Barcelona	Barcelona
			Segura	Stadium: Poble Nou; Referee: Sauri

16 September 1928	UE Sants	2–5	FC Barcelona	Barcelona
			Ramon; Pinilla; Barcelo	Stadium: Sants; Referee: Sauri

23 September 1928	FC Barcelona	0–5	Torino	Barcelona
				Stadium: Les Corts; Referee: Vilalta

25 September 1928	FC Barcelona	0–4	Torino	Barcelona
				Stadium: Les Corts; Referee: Comorera

1 November 1928	FC Barcelona	7–3	Club Patria	Barcelona
	Arocha; Ramon; Parera			Stadium: Les Corts; Referee: Comorera

25 December 1928	FC Barcelona	4–0	Ferencváros	Barcelona
	Cros; Buj			Stadium: Les Corts; Referee: Villena

26 December 1928	FC Barcelona	3–3	Ferencváros	Barcelona
	Parera; Cros			Stadium: Les Corts; Referee: Espelta

1 January 1929	FC Barcelona	2–7	Ferrol	Barcelona
	Barcelo			Stadium: Les Corts; Referee: Llovera

6 January 1929	CE Júpiter	3–5	FC Barcelona	Barcelona
			Arnau; Buj	Stadium: Poble Nou; Referee: Villena

13 January 1929	CE Manresa	2–3	FC Barcelona	Barcelona
			Ramon; Buj	Stadium: Manresa; Referee: Sauri

20 January 1929	Iluro SC	2–2	FC Barcelona	Barcelona
			Tonijuan	Stadium: Mataro

2 February 1929	FC Barcelona	2–1	Sportivo Barracas	Barcelona
	Arocha; A.Garcia			Stadium: Les Corts; Referee: Vilalta

7 February 1929	FC Barcelona	3–2	Sportivo Barracas	Barcelona
	Campabadal; A.Garcia			Stadium: Les Corts; Referee: Servando Perez (Arg)

7 February 1929	UE Lleida	2–3	FC Barcelona	Barcelona
			Parera	Stadium: Lleida; Referee: Sola

17 March 1929	FC Barcelona	6–1	Reus Deportiu	Barcelona
	Tonijuan; Hernandez			Stadium: Les Corts; Referee: Espelta

17 March 1929	FC Barcelona	1–2	Sportivo Barracas	Barcelona
	Campabadal		R.Luna 16' 37'	Stadium: Les Corts; Referee: Comorera

19 March 1929	FC Barcelona	0–3	Deportivo Alavés	Barcelona
				Stadium: Les Corts; Referee: Espelta

15 April 1929 Copa Armengol	FC Barcelona	3–2	CE Europa	Barcelona
	Ramon; Buj; Traiter			Stadium: Les Corts; Referee: Masip

17 April 1929	FC Barcelona	5–0	Vaixell Angles	Barcelona
				Stadium: Les Corts; Referee: Bellamy

21 April 1929 Copa Armengol	CE Europa	3–5	FC Barcelona	Barcelona
				Stadium: Europa; Referee: Piquera

5 May 1929	UE Figueres	1–5	FC Barcelona	Barcelona
			Ramon; Sastre; Buj; Sagi	Referee: Pujol

6 May 1929	UE Figueres	0–2	FC Barcelona	Barcelona
			Serra; Buj	Referee: Pujol

12 May 1929	FC Barcelona	2–1	Seleccio RCD Espanyol i CE Europa	Barcelona
	Sastre			Referee: Arribas

14 May 1929	CE Sabadell FC	1–3	FC Barcelona	Sabadell
			Parera II; Sastre	Stadium: Estadi de la Creu Alta; Referee: Santore

25 May 1929	CE Manresa	4–3	FC Barcelona	Barcelona
			Parera II; Martinez	Stadium: Manresa; Referee: Senal

30 May 1929	FC Gràcia	3–2	FC Barcelona	Barcelona
			Tonijuan; Barcelo	Stadium: Gracia; Referee: Dalmau

30 June 1929	Terrassa FC	1–2	FC Barcelona	Barcelona
			Arnau; A.Garcia	Stadium: Terrassa; Referee: Palomera

30 June 1929	FC Barcelona	2–2	FC Gràcia	Barcelona
	Buj 63'; Serra 80'		Castello 48' (?)	Stadium: Les Corts; Referee: Tudo

7 July 1929	FC Barcelona	6–2	CE Júpiter	Barcelona
	Arnau; Samitier; A.Garcia			Stadium: Estadi de Montjuïc; Referee: Espelta

21 July 1929	FC Palafrugell	2–6	FC Barcelona	Barcelona
			Arnau; Ramon; Sastre; Cabanes equip contrari	Stadium: Palafrugell
