= 1928 Copa del Rey final =

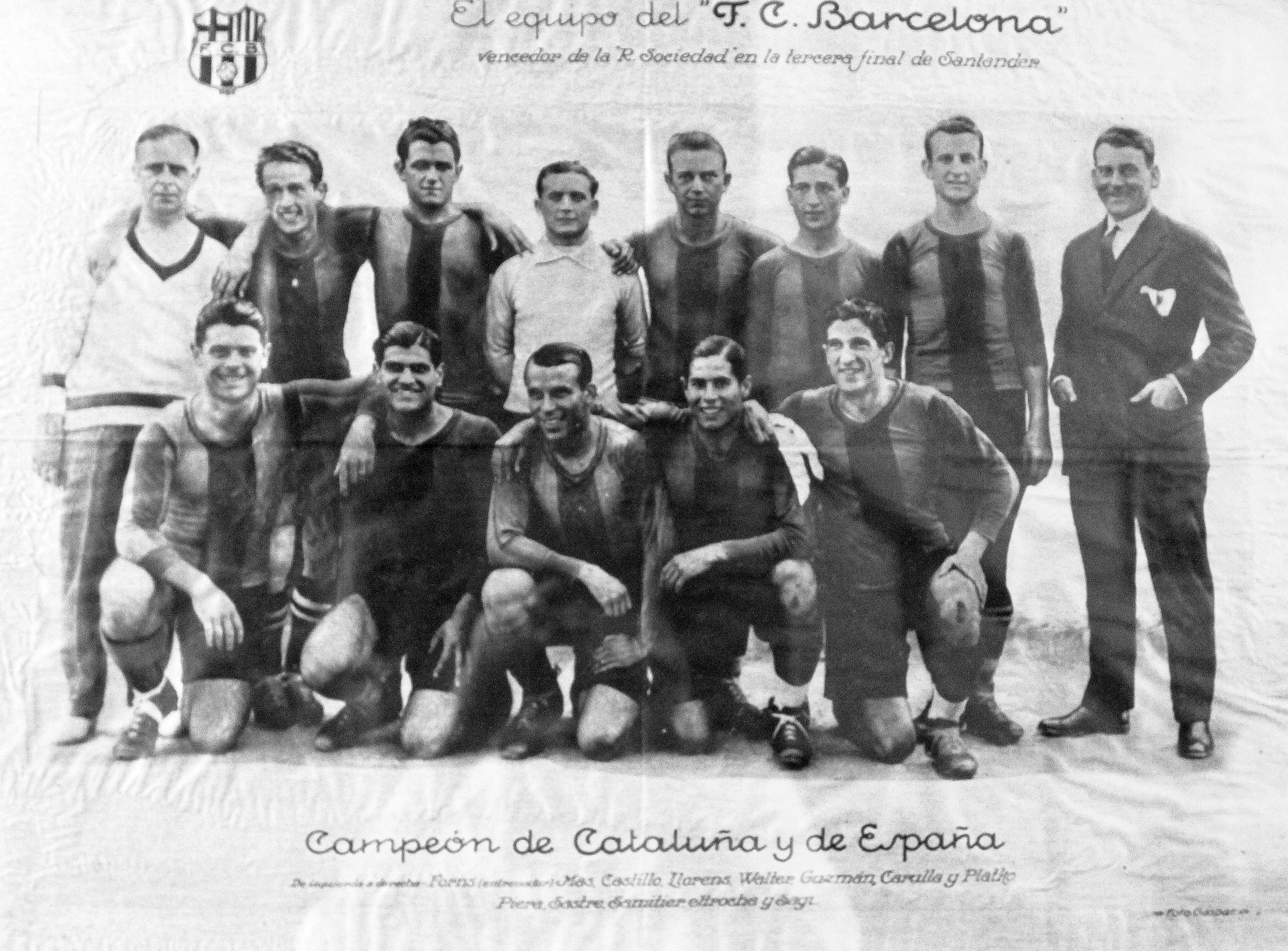
- Team of FC Barcelona, winner
- Event: 1928 Copa del Rey
Barcelona	Real Sociedad
3	1

Final
Barcelona	Real Sociedad
1	1
- Date: 20 May 1928
- Venue: El Sardinero, Santander
- Referee: Pedro Vallana

Replay
Barcelona	Real Sociedad
1	1
- Date: 22 May 1928
- Venue: El Sardinero, Santander

Replay (2nd.)
Real Sociedad	Barcelona
1	3
- Date: 29 June 1928
- Venue: El Sardinero, Santander
- Referee: Pablo Saracho

The 1928 Copa del Rey final was the 28th final of the Copa del Rey, the Spanish football cup competition. It was contested by Barcelona and Real Sociedad. As the match ended tied after extra time, two replay matches were needed to define a champion.

In the second replay, Barcelona defeated Real Sociedad 3–1 and won their eighth title.

== Overview ==
The first match was held on 20 May at El Sardinero. In that match, Barcelona goalkeeper Ferenc Plattkó left the field after injuring his head, which required stitches. As a result, forward Ángel Arocha replaced him. Nevertheless, midfielder Josep Samitier was also injured soon after, forcing Platko to return to the pitch despite his condition. Samitier would also return to the pitch after him.

Platko's performance in the final (and the action to save his goal that caused the injure) inspired poet Rafael Alberti (who had attended the match) to write his Ode to Platko in 1957, describing his catches and his injure.

No, no one, no one, no one
no one forget it, Platko
not even the final: your leaving
bloody blonde bear,
faint flag on the field
Oh, Platko,
you, so far away from Hungary
what sea would have dared not to cry for you?

— Ode to Platko, Rafael Alberti

Nevertheless, another football enthusiast and Real Sociedad supporter, Gabriel Celaya, wrote an ode stating that Platko was not responsible for his team defeat but a bad refereeing that included "ten penalties not awarded to Real Sociedad". After the match ended tied 1–1 after extra time, a replay match had to be played. Real Sociedad was considered favorite to win due to Barca's injured players. Argentine tango singer Carlos Gardel visited the injured players.

For the replay, Llorens replaced Platko. That match also ended 1–1 (after two extra time periods) so a second replay was scheduled for June 29. Finally, Barcelona won 3–1 with goals by Samitier, Sastre and Arocha. Zaldúa scored for Real Sociedad.

== Match details ==
=== Final ===
20 May 1928
16:30 CET

Barcelona	1–1 (a.e.t.)	Real Sociedad
Samitier 53'		Mariscal 83'

El Sardinero, Santander
Attendance: 18,000
Referee: Pedro Vallana

Barcelona	Real Sociedad

GK	1	(Hungary) Ferenc Plattkó	(substituted off) a' (substituted in) b' (Note: Substitutions were not allowed in those times. Plattko left the field, being replaced by forward Arocha. Nevertheless, Samitier's injury forced Plattko to return to the field despite his condition.)
DF	2	(Germany) Emil Walter
DF	3	(Spain) Enrique Mas
MF	4	(Spain) Ramón Guzmán
MF	5	(Spain) José Castillo
MF	6	(Spain) Domingo Carulla
FW	7	(Spain) Vicente Piera
FW	8	(Spain) Josep Sastre
FW	9	(Spain) Josep Samitier	(substituted off) b' (substituted in)
FW	10	(Spain) Ángel Arocha	(substituted in) a'
FW	11	(Spain) Manuel Parera
Manager:
(Spain) Romà Forns

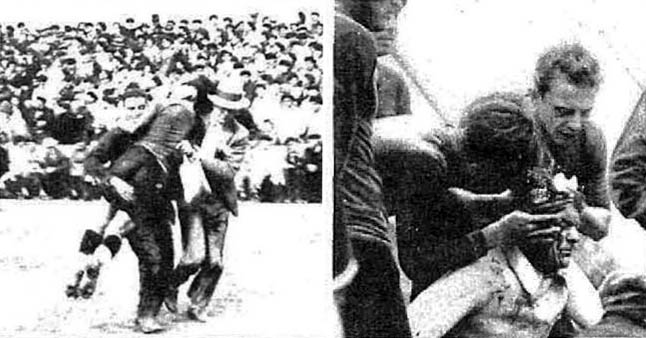
Josep Samitier (left) and Ferenc Plattko, both injured

GK	1	(Spain) Jesús Izaguirre
DF	2	(Spain) Antonio Arrillaga
DF	3	(Spain) Domingo Zaldúa
MF	4	(Spain) Amadeo Labarta
MF	5	(Spain) Martín Marculeta
MF	6	(Spain) Trino Arizcorreta
FW	7	(Spain) Paco Bienzobas
FW	8	(Spain) Ángel Mariscal
FW	9	(Spain) Cholín
FW	10	(Spain) Kiriki
FW	11	(Spain) Mariano Yurrita
Manager:
(Spain) Benito Díaz

=== Replay ===
22 May 1928
11:30 CET

Barcelona	1–1 (a.e.t.)	Real Sociedad
Piera 69'		Kiriki 32'

El Sardinero, Santander
Attendance: 15,000
Referee: Pedro Escartín

Barcelona	Real Sociedad

GK	1	(Spain) Ramón Llorens
DF	2	(Germany) Emil Walter
DF	3	(Spain) Enrique Mas
MF	4	(Spain) Ramón Guzmán	(red card) 70'
MF	5	(Spain) Domingo Carulla
MF	6	(Spain) Andrés Bosch
FW	7	(Spain) Vicente Piera
FW	8	(Spain) Josep Sastre
FW	9	(Spain) Josep Samitier
FW	10	(Spain) Ángel Arocha
FW	11	(Argentina) Emili Sagi-Barba
Manager:
(Spain) Romà Forns

GK	1	(Spain) Jesús Izaguirre
DF	2	(Spain) Antonio Arrillaga
DF	3	(Spain) Domingo Zaldúa
MF	4	(Spain) Amadeo Labarta
MF	5	(Spain) Martín Marculeta
MF	6	(Spain) Trino Arizcorreta
FW	7	(Spain) Paco Bienzobas
FW	8	(Spain) Ángel Mariscal
FW	9	(Spain) Cholín	(red card) 80'
FW	10	(Spain) Kiriki
FW	11	(Spain) Mariano Yurrita
Manager:
(Spain) Benito Díaz

=== Second replay ===
29 June 1928
17:00 CET

Barcelona	3–1	Real Sociedad
Samitier 8'; Arocha 21'; Sastre 25'		Zaldúa 16' (pen.)

El Sardinero, Santander
Attendance: 17,000
Referee: Pablo Saracho

Barcelona	Real Sociedad

GK	1	(Spain) Ramón Llorens
DF	2	(Germany) Emil Walter
DF	3	(Spain) Enrique Mas
MF	4	(Spain) Ramón Guzmán
MF	5	(Spain) José Castillo
MF	6	(Spain) Domingo Carulla	(red card) 65'
FW	7	(Spain) Vicente Piera
FW	8	(Spain) Josep Sastre
FW	9	(Spain) Josep Samitier
FW	10	(Spain) Ángel Arocha
FW	11	(Argentina) Emili Sagi-Barba
Manager:
(Spain) Romà Forns

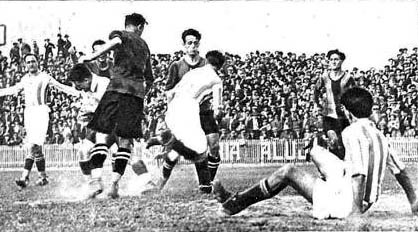
Scene of the match

GK	1	(Spain) Jesús Izaguirre
DF	2	(Spain) Antonio Arrillaga
DF	3	(Spain) Domingo Zaldúa
MF	4	(Spain) Amadeo Labarta
MF	5	(Spain) Martín Marculeta
MF	6	(Spain) Trino Arizcorreta
FW	7	(Spain) Paco Bienzobas
FW	8	(Spain) Ángel Mariscal	(red card) 65'
FW	9	(Spain) Cholín
FW	10	(Spain) Félix Ilundáin
FW	11	(Spain) Mariano Yurrita
Manager:
(Spain) Benito Díaz

Copa del Rey 1928 winners
FC Barcelona
8th title
