= 1930–31 Real Sociedad season =

Real Sociedad
1930–31 season
- President: Florentino Azqueta
- Manager: Harry Lowe
- La Liga: 3rd
- Copa del Rey: Round of 28; Out of the competition.
- Top goalscorer: League: Cholin (13); All: Cholin (13)

The 1930–31 season was Real Sociedad's third season in La Liga.

This article shows player statistics and all matches that the club played during the 1930–31 season.

== Players ==
Note: Flags indicate national team as defined under FIFA eligibility rules; some limited exceptions apply. Players may hold more than one non-FIFA nationality.

| No. | Pos. | Nation | Player |
|---|---|---|---|
| — | GK | ESP | Jesús Izaguirre |
| — | DF | ESP | Nemesio Arana |
| — | DF | ESP | Félix Ilundain |
| — | MF | ESP | Amadeo Labarta Rey |
| — | MF | ESP | Martín Marculeta |
| — | MF | ESP | Miguel Ayestaran |
| — | FW | ESP | Custodio Bienzobas |
| — | FW | ESP | Emilio Garmendia |

| No. | Pos. | Nation | Player |
|---|---|---|---|
| — | FW | ESP | Paco Bienzobas |
| — | FW | ESP | Cholín |
| — | FW | ESP | Ángel Mariscal Beuba |
| — | GK | ESP | Francisco Elzo |
| — | MF | ESP | David Lopez |
| — | FW | ESP | Narciso Oyaneder |
| — | FW | ESP | Bonifacio Ecenarro |
| — | FW | ESP | Mariano Prado Polo "Chivero" |

=== Player stats ===
Squad stats
| Player | Games played | Full games | Games starting | Used as sub | Minutes | Injuries | Cards | Sending-offs | Goals | Missed penalties |
|---|---|---|---|---|---|---|---|---|---|---|
| Amadeo Labarta Rey | 18 | 18 | 18 | 0 | 1620 | 0 | 0 | 0 | 2 | 0 |
| Nemesio Arana | 18 | 18 | 18 | 0 | 1620 | 0 | 0 | 0 | 0 | 0 |
| Miguel Ayestaran | 13 | 13 | 13 | 0 | 1170 | 0 | 0 | 0 | 0 | 0 |
| Paco Bienzobas | 18 | 18 | 18 | 0 | 1620 | 0 | 0 | 0 | 4 | 0 |
| Mariano Prado Polo "Chivero" | 1 | 1 | 1 | 0 | 90 | 0 | 0 | 0 | 0 | 0 |
| Cholín | 17 | 17 | 17 | 0 | 1530 | 0 | 0 | 0 | 13 | 0 |
| David Lopez | 6 | 6 | 6 | 0 | 540 | 0 | 0 | 0 | 0 | 0 |
| Bonifacio Ecenarro | 1 | 1 | 1 | 0 | 90 | 0 | 0 | 0 | 0 | 0 |
| Francisco Elzo | 4 | 3 | 3 | 1 | 314 | 0 | 0 | 0 | 0 | 0 |
| Emilio Garmendia | 18 | 18 | 18 | 0 | 1620 | 0 | 0 | 0 | 7 | 0 |
| Félix Ilundain | 18 | 18 | 18 | 0 | 1620 | 0 | 0 | 0 | 0 | 0 |
| Jesús Izaguirre | 15 | 14 | 15 | 0 | 1306 | 1 | 0 | 0 | 0 | 0 |
| Martín Marculeta | 18 | 18 | 18 | 0 | 1620 | 0 | 0 | 0 | 0 | 0 |
| Ángel Mariscal Beuba | 15 | 15 | 15 | 0 | 1350 | 0 | 0 | 0 | 5 | 0 |
| Narciso Oyaneder | 1 | 1 | 1 | 0 | 90 | 0 | 0 | 0 | 0 | 0 |
| Custodio Bienzobas | 18 | 18 | 18 | 0 | 1620 | 0 | 0 | 0 | 10 | 0 |

== League ==
=== League matches ===
Win Draw Loss Postponed

| 7 December 1930 1 | Real Sociedad | 2–2 | Deportivo Alavés | San Sebastián |
| | Cholín | (Report) | Manuel Olivares | Stadium: Atotxa Stadium; Referee: Ramon Melcón |

| 14 December 1930 2 | Athletic Bilbao | 6–1 | Real Sociedad | Bilbao |
| | Uribe; Gariztueta; Gorostiza; Bata | (Report) | (pen.) Ilundain | Stadium: San Mamés Stadium; Referee: Balaguer |

| 21 December 1930 3 | Real Sociedad | 4–1 | FC Barcelona | San Sebastián |
| | Cholín; Bienzobas; Ángel Mariscal Beuba | (Report) | Arocha | Stadium: Atotxa Stadium; Referee: Pedro Vallana |

| 28 December 1930 4 | Real Unión | 2–4 | Real Sociedad | Irun |
| | Luis Regueiro; Sagarzazu | (Report) | Cholín; P. Bienzobas; Ángel Mariscal Beuba | Stadium: Stadium Gal; Referee: Pelayo Serran |

| 4 January 1931 5 | Real Santander | 2–5 | Real Sociedad | Santander |
| | Santi; Larrinaga | (Report) | o.g Baragaño; Bienzobas; Emilio Garmendia Lecuona | Stadium: El Sardinero; Referee: Comorera |

| 11 January 1931 6 | Real Sociedad | 3–1 | CE Europa | San Sebastián |
| | Paco Bienzobas; Cholín; Ángel Mariscal Beuba | (Report) | Bestit II | Stadium: Atotxa Stadium; Referee: Hernández Areces |

| 18 January 1931 7 | Arenas Club de Getxo | 1–3 | Real Sociedad | Getxo |
| | Mandalúniz | (Report) | Bienzobas; Cholín | Stadium: ? |

| 25 January 1931 8 | Real Sociedad | 2–1 | Real Madrid | San Sebastián |
| | Bienzobas | (Report) | Olaso | Stadium: Atotxa Stadium; Referee: Pedro Vallana |

| 1 February 1931 9 | Espanyol | 1–0 | Real Sociedad | Barcelona |
| | Juvé | (Report) | | Stadium: Montjuïc olympic stadium Referee: Hernández Areces |

| 8 February 1931 10 | Deportivo Alavés | 1–2 | Real Sociedad | Gasteiz |
| | Albéniz | (Report) | Bienzobas; Garmendia | Stadium: Mendizorrotza Stadium; Referee: Comorera |

| 15 February 1931 11 | Real Sociedad | 1–0 | Athletic Bilbao | San Sebastián |
| | Bienzobas | (Report) | | Stadium: Atotxa Stadium; Referee: Vilalta |

| 22 February 1931 12 | FC Barcelona | 5–1 | Real Sociedad | Barcelona |
| | Arocha; Piera | (Report) | Bienzobas; (red card) Ayestaran | Stadium: Camp de Les Corts; Referee: Balaguer |

| 1 March 1931 13 | Real Sociedad | 3–3 | Real Unión | San Sebastián |
| | Bienzobas; Ángel Mariscal Beuba; Cholín | (Report) | Petit; Gamborena; Regueiro | Stadium: Atotxa Stadium; Referee: Hernández Areces |

| 8 March 1931 14 | Real Sociedad | 4–7 | Real Santander | San Sebastián |
| | Cholín; Garmendia; Bienzobas | (Report) | Ibarra; Óscar; Loredo | Stadium: Atotxa Stadium |

| 14 March 1931 15 | CE Europa | 2–1 | Real Sociedad | Barcelona |
| | Cros; Miró | (Report) | Ángel Mariscal Beuba | Stadium: Nou Sardenya |

| 22 March 1931 16 | Real Sociedad | 4–1 | Arenas Club de Getxo | San Sebastián |
| | Garmendia; Cholín; P. Bienzobas; C. Bienzobas | (Report) | Yermo | Stadium: Atotxa Stadium; Referee: Ramón Melcón |

| 29 March 1931 17 | Real Madrid | 2–0 | Real Sociedad | Madrid |
| | Olaso; Cosme | (Report) | | Stadium: Santiago Bernabéu Stadium; Referee: Sócrates Quintana |

| 5 April 1931 18 | Real Sociedad | 2–1 | Espanyol | San Sebastián |
| | Garmendia; P. Bienzobas (pen.) | (Report) | Besolí | Stadium: Atotxa Stadium |

=== League position ===
| Position | Club | Played | W | D | L | GF | GA | Points | GD | Comments |
|---|---|---|---|---|---|---|---|---|---|---|
| 1 | Athletic Bilbao | 18 | 11 | 0 | 7 | 73 | 33 | 22 | +40 | Champion of La Liga |
| 2 | Racing de Santander | 18 | 10 | 2 | 6 | 49 | 37 | 22 | +12 | Torneo de la Exposición Colonial |
| 3 | Real Sociedad | 18 | 10 | 2 | 6 | 42 | 39 | 22 | +3 |
| 4 | FC Barcelona | 18 | 7 | 7 | 4 | 40 | 43 | 21 | -3 |
| 5 | Arenas Club de Getxo | 18 | 8 | 2 | 8 | 35 | 38 | 18 | -3 |

== Cup ==
| 13 April 1931 Round of 28 | Real Betis | 5–1 | Real Sociedad | Seville |
| | Altuna; Romero; Aranda; Sanz | (Report) | Paco Bienzobas | Stadium: Benito Villamarín; Referee: (Catalonia) Arribas Seijas |

| 4 May 1931 Round of 28 | Real Sociedad | 3–1 | Real Betis | San Sebastián |
| | P. Bienzobas | (Report) | Aranda | Stadium: Atotxa Stadium; Referee: Villalta |
