= 1932–33 FC Barcelona season =

34th season in existence of FC Barcelona

Barcelona
1932–33 season
- President: Joan Coma
- Manager: Jack Greenwell
- Stadium: Les Corts
- La Liga: 4th
- Catalan League: Runner-up
- Copa del Rey: Round of 32
- Top goalscorer: League: Juan Ramón (12); All: Ángel Arocha (23)

The 1932–33 season is FC Barcelona's 34th in existence. It covers the period from 1932-08-01 to 1933-07-31.

For the first time since the introduction of Primera División, FC Barcelona ended the season without winning a title.

== First-team squad ==
Note: Flags indicate national team as defined under FIFA eligibility rules; some limited exceptions apply. Players may hold more than one non-FIFA nationality.

No.	Pos.	Nation	Player
—	GK	ESP	Juan José Nogués
—	GK	ESP	Ramón Llorens
—	GK	ESP	Manuel Vidal
—	GK	ESP	Manuel Cruz
—	DF	ESP	Ramón Zabalo
—	DF	ESP	Patricio Arnau
—	DF	ESP	Juan Rafa
—	DF	ESP	Esteban Pedrol
—	DF	ESP	Cristóbal Martí
—	DF	ESP	Francisco Alcoriza
—	DF	ESP	José Saló
—	MF	ESP	Valentín Font
—	MF	ESP	Daniel Helguera
—	MF	ESP	Salvador Artigas

No.	Pos.	Nation	Player
—	MF	ESP	Severiano Goiburu
—	MF	ESP	Carlos Bestit
—	MF	ESP	Ramón Guzmán
—	MF	ESP	Vicente Piera
—	MF	ESP	Esteban Cifuentes
—	MF	ESP	Agustín Costa
—	MF	ESP	Constantino Vela
—	FW	ESP	Victorio Cruz
—	FW	ESP	Joaquim Jordà
—	FW	ESP	Samuel Escrig
—	FW	ESP	Manuel Parera
—	FW	ESP	Juan Ramón
—	FW	ESP	Ángel Arocha
—	FW	ESP	Miguel Gual

== Transfers ==
=== In ===
Note: Flags indicate national team as defined under FIFA eligibility rules; some limited exceptions apply. Players may hold more than one non-FIFA nationality.

No.	Pos.	Nation	Player
—	GK	ESP	Manuel Cruz
—	MF	ESP	Valentín Font
—	MF	ESP	Daniel Helguera
—	MF	ESP	Salvador Artigas
—	MF	ESP	Esteban Cifuentes

No.	Pos.	Nation	Player
—	MF	ESP	Agustín Costa
—	MF	ESP	Constantino Vela
—	FW	ESP	Samuel Escrig
—	FW	ESP	Joaquim Jordà
—	FW	ESP	Victorio Cruz

=== Out ===
Note: Flags indicate national team as defined under FIFA eligibility rules; some limited exceptions apply. Players may hold more than one non-FIFA nationality.

No.	Pos.	Nation	Player
—	GK	BRA	Jaguaré Bezerra
—	DF	ESP	Enrique Mas (to CE Espanyol)
—	DF	ESP	Ramón Sanfeliu
—	DF	ESP	Joaquín Roig
—	MF	ESP	David Gamiz
—	MF	ESP	Juan Font
—	MF	ESP	José Sastre

No.	Pos.	Nation	Player
—	MF	ESP	Fernando Diego
—	MF	BRA	Fausto dos Santos
—	MF	ESP	José Carlos Castillo
—	FW	ESP	Josep Samitier (to Madrid CF)
—	FW	ESP	Emilio Sagi Liñán
—	FW	ESP	Luis Cambra

== Competitions ==
=== La Liga ===
==== League table ====
Pos	Team	Pld	W	D	L	GF	GA	GD	Pts
3	CE Espanyol	18	10	2	6	33	30	+3	22
4	Barcelona	18	7	5	6	42	34	+8	19
5	Betis	18	6	5	7	31	45	–14	17

==== Results by round ====
Round	1	2	3	4	5	6	7	8	9	10	11	12	13	14	15	16	17	18
Ground	A	H	A	H	A	H	A	H	H	H	A	H	A	H	A	H	A	A
Result	D	W	D	W	L	D	W	D	W	W	L	W	L	W	L	L	L	D
Position	6	3	4	4	4	4	4	4	4	4	4	4	4	3	4	4	4	4

Source: Competitive matches
A = Away; H = Home; W = Win; D = Draw; L = Loss

==== Matches ====
27 November 1932 1	Donostia	2–2	Barcelona	San Sebastián
	Kiriki 62', 89'	Report	Arocha 78', 83'	Stadium: Atotxa; Referee: Elorza

4 December 1932 2	Barcelona	2–0	Alavés	Barcelona
	Arocha 49', 75'	Report		Stadium: Les Corts; Referee: Escartín Morán

11 December 1932 3	Valencia	2–2	Barcelona	Valencia
	Abdón 31'; Torredeflot 89'	Report	Gual 17'; Ramón 34'	Stadium: Mestalla; Referee: Medina

18 December 1932 4	Barcelona	5–2	Arenas	Barcelona
	Ramón 13', 47'; Bestit 14'; Gual 42'; Helguera 62'	Report	Ibarrondo 6'; Juanito 67'	Stadium: Les Corts; Referee: Gómez

25 December 1932 5	Betis	2–1	Barcelona	Seville
	Rocasolano I 31'; Capillas 41'	Report	Arocha 73' (pen.)	Stadium: Patronato Obrero; Referee: Canga Argüelles

1 January 1933 6	Barcelona	1–1	Madrid	Barcelona
	Arocha 68'	Report	Regueiro 78' (pen.)	Stadium: Les Corts; Referee: Ledesma

8 January 1933 7	Athletic Bilbao	1–3	Barcelona	Bilbao
	Iraragorri 75'	Report	Ramón 6'; Goiburu 42'; Parera 87'	Stadium: San Mamés; Referee: Melcón Bartolomé

17 January 1933 8	Barcelona	1–1	Espanyol	Barcelona
	Helguera 75'	Report	Prat 61'	Stadium: Les Corts; Referee: López Espinosa

22 January 1933 9	Barcelona	4–0	Racing de Santander	Barcelona
	Ramón 7'; Arocha 17', 29' (pen.); Goiburu 75'	Report		Stadium: Les Corts; Referee: Sanchis Orduña

29 January 1933 10	Barcelona	3–2	Donostia	Barcelona
	Arocha 6'; Parera 36'; Ramón 50'	Report	Chivero 30'; Tolete 58'	Stadium: Les Corts; Referee: Gómez Juaneda

5 February 1933 11	Alavés	2–1	Barcelona	Vitoria-Gasteiz
	Irureta 20', 37'	Report	Bestit 30'	Stadium: Mendizorrotza; Referee: Melcón Bartolomé

12 February 1933 12	Barcelona	4–2	Valencia	Barcelona
	Ramón 7'; Arocha 7' (pen.), 30'; Helguera 75'	Report	Vilanova 51'; Picolín 54'	Stadium: Les Corts; Referee: Balaguer García

19 February 1933 13	Arenas	5–1	Barcelona	Getxo
	Barrios 22'; Iriondo 31', 37', 43'; Emilín 67'	Report	Martí 23'	Stadium: Ibaiondo; Referee: Villanueva

26 February 1933 14	Barcelona	4–1	Betis	Barcelona
	Ramón 10'; Goiburu 37'; Bestit 54', 66'	Report	Gabella 35'	Stadium: Les Corts; Referee: Sanchis Orduña

5 March 1933 15	Madrid	2–1	Barcelona	Madrid
	Samitier 35', 68'	Report	Goiburu 89'	Stadium: Chamartín; Referee: Sanchis Orduña

12 March 1933 16	Barcelona	2–3	Athletic Bilbao	Barcelona
	Ramón 51', 68'	Report	Alcoriza 6' (o.g.); Gorostiza 52'; Gerardo 65'	Stadium: Les Corts; Referee: Balaguer García

19 March 1933 17	Espanyol	2–1	Barcelona	Barcelona
	Pueyo 79', 81'	Report	Artigas 33'	Stadium: Sarrià; Referee: Castarlenas Mora

26 March 1933 18	Racing de Santander	4–4	Barcelona	Santander
	Larrinaga 3', 43'; San Emeterio 50'; Cisco 53'	Report	Bestit 9'; Saló 46' (pen.); Ramón 74', 87'	Stadium: El Sardinero; Referee: Ostalé Gómez

=== Copa del Rey ===
==== Round of 32 ====
9 April 1933 First leg	Barcelona	2–0	Betis	Barcelona
	Arocha			Stadium: Les Corts

16 April 1933 Second leg	Betis	4–0	Barcelona	Seville
				Stadium: Patronato Obrero

=== Catalan football championship ===
==== League table ====
Pos	Team	Pld	W	D	L	GF	GA	GD	Pts
1	Espanyol	14	12	1	1	42	14	+28	25
2	Barcelona	14	12	1	1	53	15	+38	25
3	Palafrugell	14	7	1	6	28	29	–1	15

==== Matches ====
28 August 1932 1	Barcelona	7–0	Sabadell	Barcelona
	Samitier; Arocha; Ramón; Piera			Stadium: Les Corts

4 September 1932 2	Palafrugell	2–4	Barcelona	Palafrugell
			Gual; Arocha	Stadium: Camp del Casal

11 September 1932 3	Júpiter	1–3	Barcelona	Barcelona
			Rafa; Piera; Bestit	Stadium: La Vernenda

18 September 1932 4	Barcelona	5–1	Sants	Barcelona
	Samitier; Ramón; Piera; Goiburu			Stadium: Les Corts

25 September 1932 5	Barcelona	4–2	Badalona	Barcelona
	Goiburu; Samitier; Ramón			Stadium: Les Corts

2 October 1932 6	Barcelona	4–2	Martinenc	Barcelona
	Goiburu; Samitier; Parera			Stadium: Les Corts

9 October 1932 7	Espanyol	3–2	Barcelona	Barcelona
			Samitier; Ramón	Stadium: Sarrià

12 October 1932 8	Sabadell	0–2	Barcelona	Sabadell
			Goiburu; Arocha	Stadium: Creu Alta

16 October 1932 9	Barcelona	3–1	Palafrugell	Barcelona
	Arocha; Gual			Stadium: Les Corts

23 October 1932 10	Barcelona	3–0	Júpiter	Barcelona
	Rafa; Piera; Bestit			Stadium: Les Corts

30 October 1932 11	Sants	1–4	Barcelona	Barcelona
			Samitier; Ramón; Piera; Goiburu

6 November 1932 12	Badalona	1–5	Barcelona	Badalona
			Arocha; Goiburu; Piera; Ramón

13 November 1932 13	Martinenc	1–5	Barcelona	Barcelona
			Bestit; Arocha; Pedrol

8 December 1932 14	Barcelona	1–1	Espanyol	Barcelona
	Goiburu			Stadium: Les Corts

== Results ==
Friendly

7 August 1932	Atlètic de Sabadell	2 - 4	FC Barcelona	Barcelona
			Samitier; Bestit; Sitjes equip contrari	Stadium: Sabadell; Referee: Munoz

14 August 1932	CF Badalona	0 - 3	FC Barcelona	Barcelona
			Dos Santos; Pedrol	Stadium: Badalona; Referee: Comorera

21 August 1932 Copa Raquel Meller	UE Sants	5 - 1	FC Barcelona	Barcelona
			Romero	Stadium: Guinardó; Referee: Rovira

23 September 1932	Gimnàstic	1 - 2	FC Barcelona	Barcelona
				Stadium: Tarragona

24 September 1932 sense dades	Gimnàstic	v	FC Barcelona	Barcelona
				Stadium: Tarragona

24 September 1932	FC Barcelona	0 - 0	RCD Mallorca	Barcelona
				Stadium: Les Corts

25 December 1932	FC Barcelona	0 - 4	Újpest Football Club	Barcelona
				Stadium: Camp de les Corts; Referee: Mallorquí

26 December 1932	FC Barcelona	1 - 3	Újpest Football Club	Barcelona
	Goiburu			Stadium: Camp de les Corts; Referee: Comorera

2 February 1933	FC Barcelona	2 - 3	Seleccio Espanyola	Barcelona
	Bestit; Arocha			Stadium: Camp de les Corts; Referee: Espelta

11 February 1933 suspes per pluja	FC Barcelona	v	CE Júpiter

11 February 1933	CF Amposta	0 - 1	FC Barcelona	Barcelona
				Stadium: Amposta

12 February 1933	CF Amposta	3 - 2	FC Barcelona	Barcelona
				Stadium: Amposta

25 March 1933 Torneig Barcelona	UA Horta	0 - 1	FC Barcelona	Barcelona
			Vilaseca 35'	Stadium: Horta; Referee: Esteve

2 April 1933 Torneig Barcelona	CE Júpiter	2 - 1	FC Barcelona	Barcelona
			Arocha	Stadium: Poble Nou; Referee: Grau

2 April 1933	FC Barcelona	2 - 0	Atlético de Madrid	Barcelona
	Pascual; Sastre			Stadium: Les Corts; Referee: Comorera

16 April 1933 Trofeu Barcelona (Copa El Mundo Deportivo)	FC Santboià	0 - 2	FC Barcelona	Barcelona
			Sastre; Vilaseca	Stadium: Sant Boi; Referee: Aycart

23 April 1933	FC Barcelona	1 - 3	RCD Espanyol	Barcelona
	Bestit			Stadium: Les Corts; Referee: Casterlanas

30 April 1933	FC Barcelona	4 - 2	Tenerife	Barcelona
	Bestit; Font Sastre Jorda			Stadium: Les Corts; Referee: Espelta

7 May 1933	FC Barcelona	1 - 2	Tenerife	Barcelona
	Bestit 49'			Stadium: Les Corts; Referee: Mallorquí

21 May 1933	FC Barcelona	3 - 2	Terrassa FC	Barcelona
	Sastre			Stadium: Les Corts; Referee: Bru

21 May 1933	FC Barcelona	2 - 4	Athletic Bilbao	Barcelona
	Jorda; Morera			Stadium: Les Corts; Referee: Sola

25 May 1933	FC Barcelona	1 - 1	Red Star FC	Barcelona
	Arocha			Stadium: Les Corts; Referee: Marine

28 May 1933	FC Barcelona	5 - 1	Red Star FC	Barcelona
	Ramon; Goiburu; Morera			Stadium: Les Corts; Referee: Comorera

4 June 1933	CA Paris	1 - 7	FC Barcelona	París
			Padron; Goiburu; Morera	Stadium: Buffalo; Referee: Cateloy

5 June 1933	Red Star FC	2 - 1	FC Barcelona	París
			Morera	Stadium: Saint-Quentin

5 June 1933	FC Barcelona	5 - 2	Racing Ferrol	Barcelona
	Sastre; Arnau; Cifuentes; Helguera; Pascual			Stadium: Les Corts; Referee: Espelta

11 June 1933	FC Barcelona	2 - 1	Betis	Barcelona
	Miranda 65'; Ramon 88'			Stadium: Les Corts; Referee: Boada

15 June 1933	FC Barcelona	3 - 2	Racing	Barcelona
	Goiburu 20'; Arocha 30'; Ramon 35'			Stadium: Les Corts; Referee: Rovira

23 June 1933	Hércules CF	1 - 4	FC Barcelona	Alacant

25 June 1933	Gandia i València CF	3 - 3	FC Barcelona	València
			Goiburu; Valls	Stadium: Gandia; Referee: Gomez Juaneda

29 June 1933	FC Barcelona	3 - 1	AC Milan	Barcelona
	Bestit; Arnau			Stadium: Les Corts; Referee: Comorera

29 June 1933	FC Barcelona	5 - 1	Sevilla FC Amateur	Barcelona
	Sanz de la Huerga; Ocanita			Stadium: Les Corts; Referee: Lopez

1 July 1933 1a Copa Aiguader	Reus Deportiu	2 - 5	FC Barcelona	Barcelona
			Arocha; Helguera; Bestit	Stadium: Reus; Referee: Mallorquí

2 July 1933 2a Copa Aiguader	Reus Deportiu	0 - 1	FC Barcelona	Barcelona
			Helguera	Stadium: Reus; Referee: v

2 July 1933	FC Barcelona	1 - 1	Pilsen	Barcelona
	Arocha			Stadium: Les Corts; Referee: Mallorquí

2 July 1933	FC Barcelona	0 - 1	AC Milan	Barcelona
				Stadium: Les Corts; Referee: Armengol

9 July 1933	CF Badalona	6 - 1	FC Barcelona	Barcelona
			Costa 52'	Stadium: Badalona; Referee: Comorera

9 July 1933	CF Ripollet	1 - 4	FC Barcelona	Barcelona
			Babot; Orriols; Vela; Salo	Stadium: Ripollet; Referee: Sauri

17 July 1933	CF Badalona	6 - 2	FC Barcelona	Barcelona
	Terrades; Forgas; Xiol		Alcayna 10'; Artigas	Stadium: Badalona; Referee: Esteve
