= Zaldúa =

Zaldúa is a surname. Notable people with the surname include:

- Domingo Zaldúa (1903–1980), Spanish footballer
- Francisco Javier Zaldúa (1811–1882), Colombian politician
- José Antonio Zaldúa (1941–2018), Spanish footballer
- Joseba Zaldúa (born 1992), Spanish footballer
- Narciso Clavería y Zaldúa, 1st Count of Manila (1795–1851), Spanish army officer
