= 1929 La Liga =

Inaugural season of La Liga

Primera División
- Season: 1929
- Champions: Barcelona (1st title)
- Matches: 90
- Goals: 383 (4.26 per match)
- Top goalscorer: Paco Bienzobas (Real Sociedad, 17 goals)
- Biggest home win: Athletic Bilbao 9–0 Español
- Biggest away win: Racing Santander 0–4 Athletic Bilbao
- Longest winning run: 6 matches Arenas; Barcelona
- Longest unbeaten run: 11 matches Barcelona
- Longest winless run: 7 matches Racing Santander
- Longest losing run: 7 matches Racing Santander

The 1929 Primera División season was the inaugural season of the Primera División. It started on 10 February 1929 and finished on 23 June 1929. A total of 10 teams participated in the league.

After the failure to create a national league in 1928, that ended with the teams split into two unconcluded leagues, an agreement with the Royal Spanish Football Federation was finally reached for the creation of a national league.

Barcelona won the title after beating Real Unión in the last round and taking advantage of the loss of Real Madrid at Athletic Bilbao. Therefore, the Catalans were proclaimed the inaugural champions.

== Election of teams ==
After months of discussion, on 23 November 1928 the creation of a championship divided in divisions was finalized.

The first division would be joined by the six teams that won any time the Spanish Championship (Arenas, Athletic Bilbao, Barcelona, Real Madrid, Real Sociedad and Real Unión) and three teams that qualified for at least one final (Athletic Madrid, Español and Europa).

The tenth place would be decided in a tournament where only the winner would join La Liga, while the rest of the participant teams played the Segunda División with Racing Madrid.

=== Qualifying tournament ===
Racing Santander achieved the last place in the inaugural season of La Liga after beating Sevilla in the second tie-break match.

First round
25–26 December – Bilbao
Oviedo | 2 | 4
Iberia | 2 | 1
25 December – Madrid
Real Betis | 2
Alavés | 1

Quarter-finals
10–13 January – Chamartín de la Rosa
Racing Santander | 2 | 2
Valencia | 2 | 1
13 January – Valencia
Oviedo | 0
Real Betis | 1
13 January – León
Celta | 3
Sporting Gijón | 2
17 January – Madrid
Sevilla | 4
Deportivo La Coruña | 1

Semi-finals
23 January – Chamartín de la Rosa
Real Betis | 1
Racing Santander | 2
27 January – Madrid
Sevilla | 2
Celta | 1

Final
3, 6, 9 February – Madrid
Racing Santander | 1 | 2 | 2
Sevilla | 1 | 2 | 1

== Team information ==
Location of teams in 1929 La Liga
Teams in Barcelona: Barcelona, Español, Europa
Teams in Madrid: Ath. Madrid, Real Madrid

| Club | City | Stadium |
|---|---|---|
| Arenas | Getxo | Ibaiondo |
| Athletic Bilbao | Bilbao | San Mamés |
| Athletic Madrid | Madrid | Metropolitano |
| Barcelona | Barcelona | Les Corts |
| Español | Barcelona | Sarriá |
| Europa | Barcelona | El Guinardó |
| Racing Santander | Santander | El Sardinero |
| Real Madrid | Madrid | Chamartín |
| Real Sociedad | San Sebastián | Atocha |
| Real Unión | Irun | Gal |

== League table ==
| Pos | Team | Pld | W | D | L | GF | GA | GD | Pts | Relegation |
|---|---|---|---|---|---|---|---|---|---|---|
| 1 | Barcelona (C) | 18 | 11 | 3 | 4 | 37 | 23 | +14 | 25 | |
| 2 | Real Madrid | 18 | 11 | 1 | 6 | 40 | 27 | +13 | 23 | |
| 3 | Athletic Bilbao | 18 | 8 | 4 | 6 | 47 | 34 | +13 | 20 (Note: Athletic Bilbao finished ahead of Real Sociedad on head-to-head points: Athletic Bilbao–Real Sociedad 4–2, Real Sociedad–Athletic Bilbao 1–1.) | |
| 4 | Real Sociedad | 18 | 8 | 4 | 6 | 46 | 41 | +5 | 20 | |
| 5 | Arenas | 18 | 8 | 3 | 7 | 33 | 43 | −10 | 19 | |
| 6 | Athletic Madrid | 18 | 8 | 2 | 8 | 43 | 41 | +2 | 18 (Note: Athletic Madrid finished ahead of Español on head-to-head goal difference: Athletic Madrid–Español 7–1, Español–Athletic Madrid 3–2) | |
| 7 | Español | 18 | 7 | 4 | 7 | 32 | 38 | −6 | 18 | |
| 8 | Europa | 18 | 6 | 4 | 8 | 45 | 49 | −4 | 16 | |
| 9 | Real Unión | 18 | 5 | 2 | 11 | 40 | 42 | −2 | 12 | |
| 10 | Racing Santander (O) | 18 | 3 | 3 | 12 | 25 | 50 | −25 | 9 | Qualification for the relegation play-offs |

Source: BDFútbol
Rules for classification: 1) points; 2) head-to-head points; 3) head-to-head goal difference; 4) goal difference; 5) number of goals scored.
(C) Champions; (O) Play-off winners

== Results ==
| Home \ Away | ARE | ATH | ATM | BAR | ESP | EUR | RAC | RMA | RSO | RUN |
|---|---|---|---|---|---|---|---|---|---|---|
| Arenas | — | 1–0 | 2–3 | 0–2 | 3–0 | 2–2 | 2–1 | 3–2 | 3–0 | 1–1 |
| Athletic Bilbao | 2–3 | — | 3–3 | 5–1 | 9–0 | 2–0 | 0–0 | 2–0 | 4–2 | 2–1 |
| Athletic Madrid | 1–2 | 2–3 | — | 4–1 | 7–1 | 5–4 | 4–0 | 0–3 | 0–3 | 3–1 |
| Barcelona | 2–2 | 3–0 | 4–0 | — | 1–0 | 5–2 | 5–1 | 1–2 | 1–0 | 4–1 |
| Español | 1–2 | 4–1 | 3–2 | 1–1 | — | 3–1 | 3–0 | 4–0 | 1–1 | 3–2 |
| Europa | 5–2 | 1–1 | 4–1 | 1–1 | 0–3 | — | 4–1 | 5–2 | 4–3 | 3–3 |
| Racing Santander | 5–1 | 0–4 | 1–2 | 0–2 | 1–1 | 3–2 | — | 1–3 | 6–1 | 1–3 |
| Real Madrid | 2–0 | 5–1 | 2–1 | 0–1 | 2–0 | 5–0 | 2–2 | — | 2–1 | 2–0 |
| Real Sociedad | 3–2 | 1–1 | 3–3 | 3–0 | 1–1 | 5–4 | 8–1 | 5–4 | — | 3–2 |
| Real Unión | 7–1 | 6–3 | 1–2 | 1–2 | 4–3 | 2–3 | 3–1 | 0–2 | 2–3 | — |

Source: BDFútbol
Legend: Blue = home team win; Yellow = draw; Red = away team win.

== Relegation play-off ==
Last placed team Racing Santander faced Sevilla, winner of the 1929 Segunda División, in a two-legged play-off. Racing won 3–2 on aggregate, thus remaining in La Liga.

| 1929 | Sevilla | 2–1 | Racing Santander | Seville |

| 1929 | Racing Santander | 2–0 (3–2 agg.) | Sevilla | Santander |

== Top scorers ==
| Rank | Goalscorers | Goal | Team |
|---|---|---|---|
| 1 | (Spain) Paco Bienzobas | 17 | Real Sociedad |
| 2 | (Spain) Cosme Vázquez | 15 | Athletic Madrid |
| 3 | (Spain) Luis Marín | 12 | Athletic Madrid |
| 3 | (Spain) Lafuente | 12 | Athletic Bilbao |
| 5 | (Spain) Manuel Parera | 11 | Barcelona |
| 5 | (Spain) Manuel Cros | 11 | Europa |
| 5 | (Spain) José María Yermo | 11 | Arenas |
| 5 | (Spain) Luis Regueiro | 11 | Real Unión |
| 5 | (Spain) Santiago Urtizberea | 11 | Real Unión |
| 5 | (Spain) Jaime Lazcano | 11 | Real Madrid |
| 5 | (Spain) Gaspar Rubio | 11 | Real Madrid |

=== Pichichi Trophy ===
Note: This list is the alternative top scorers list provided by newspaper Diario Marca, it differs from the one above which is based on official match reports

| Goalscorers | Goal | Team |
|---|---|---|
| (Spain) Paco Bienzobas | 14 | Real Sociedad |
| (Spain) Lafuente | 12 | Athletic Bilbao |
| (Spain) Luis Regueiro | 12 | Real Unión |
| (Spain) Gaspar Rubio | 12 | Real Madrid |

== See also ==
- 1929 Copa del Rey
