= Ramón Melcón =

Spanish football referee (1900–1973)

- Born: Ramón Melcón Bartolomé; 30 November 1900; Madrid, Spain
- Died: 2 July 1973 (aged 72); Madrid, Spain
- Citizenship: Spanish
- Occupations: International football referee; Football manager; Journalist
- Known for: Manager of Valencia CF
Association football career
- Full name: Ramón Melcón Bartolomé
Senior career*
Years	Team	Apps	(Gls)
- Recreativo Español
Managerial career
- 1954–55: Spain B (2)
- 1955: Spain (2)
- * Club domestic league appearances and goals

Ramón Melcón Bartolomé (30 November 1900 – 2 July 1973) was a Spanish journalist, football referee and manager who co-directed two matches of the Spain national team in 1955.

As a referee, he officiated a total of 153 La Liga matches between 1928 and 1948, and four international matches between 1930 and 1936.

== Refereeing career ==
Born on 30 November 1900 in Madrid, Melcón began his footballing career as a player in his hometown club at Recreativo Español, but it did not bear fruit, and he soon left it to dedicate himself to refereeing, an occupation that made him famous in Spanish football. Attached to the College of Referees of the Center, later Castellano, he remained there throughout his entire career, between 1921 and 1948.

In the Copa del Rey, Melcón directed 85 matches between 1927 and 1948, still being the second referee who has directed the most matches in this competition; However, he never had the honor of overseeing a final. In La Liga, he refereed a total of 153 matches between 1929 and 1948. He also refereed one match in the Campeonato de Portugal, the second leg of the quarterfinal between Benfica and FC Porto on 11 June 1933, which ended in a 4–2 win to the former.

Notably, Melcón refereed the first-ever La Liga match of Racing de Santander on 12 February 1929, which ended in a 2–0 loss to FC Barcelona. Notably, in the first leg of the 1930 Copa del Rey round of 16 between Real Betis and FC Barcelona on 20 April 1930, Melcón had a "scandalous refereeing" due to his partiality in favor of Barcelona, disallowing Betis' second goal and not giving a penalty after Barça's defender Enrique Mas cleared the ball with both hands before allowing Barça's equalizer from Ángel Arocha, who had received the pass from an offside position. When Melcón whistled the end of the first half, he had to face the stands, taking refuge in the FC Barcelona booth, which caused the premature end of the match at half-time with the score at 1–1 draw. It took an hour and a half for referee Ramón Melcón Bartolomé to leave the Stadium, and he finally did so, unmolested, in a car, accompanied by referees from Andalusian federations.

In 1930, the Referee Committee of the Royal Spanish Football Federation (RFEF) nominated him as an international referee, in the framework of the judges of the International Football Federation (FIFA). In total, he refereed four international matches between 1930 and 1936, all friendlies, including three involving the Portuguese national team, who won twice in Lisbon and lost the other in Porto. Although he did not participate in any FIFA World Cup, he was considered one of the best referees at this level.

After his retirement as an active referee, he held the presidency of the Central Committee of Referees.

== Managerial career ==
In 1953, Melcón became a member of the National Amateur and Youth Committee created by the RFEF under the presidency of Sancho Dávila, but following a collective resignation in March 1954, including that of the coach of the national youth team, Melcón was appointed for that role ahead of the Seventh FIFA International Youth Tournament as well as the debut of Spain B in the Mediterranean Cup in 1953–58. The VII Youth Tournament was played according to the system used in the 1950 World Cup in Brazil and was developed with the motto of "world championship", not only because the Hungarians had worn such a halo since they arrived, but also because FIFA, distant in Zurich, remained silent about it. Melcón led the Spanish youth team to a 1–0 victory over Argentina in the semifinals followed by a 2–2 draw with West Germany in the final, and after both teams failed to break the tie in extra time, Spain was proclaimed champion based on better Goal Average during the group stage.

At the Mediterranean Cup, Melcón led Spain B in two matches, a 2–0 victory over France B on 30 May 1954 and a 7–1 trashing of Greece on 13 March 1955, and although he was then replaced by Guillermo Eizaguirre, Spain B went on to win the title.

In 1955, Melcón provisionally served as the national coach of the senior team in two matches against France and England, which ended in a loss and a draw respectively. Until the 1960s, it was very common to give the reins of the national team not to renowned technicians, but to federations and even prominent journalists, such as Melcón and Pedro Escartín, the last two, after being referees.

Melcón was also a professor at the National Coaching School since its foundation, and as a teacher, he also worked at the Castellana School of Referees.

== Journalist career ==
Founder and president of the Spanish Association of Sports Journalists and vice president of the International Sports Press Association, Melcón worked as a journalist for decades, including in the newspapers El Imparcial, Informaciones, Campeón, El Debate, La Libertad, Marca, and El Alcázar.

Melcón was also a correspondent for Norte Desportivo and Mundo Desportivo in Portugal, L'Équipe in France, and El Plata in Uruguay. He also wrote some works of a historical nature.

== Death ==
Melcón died on 2 July 1973, at the age of 72.

== Honours ==
Spain youth team

- FIFA International Youth Tournament: 1954

Spain B

- Mediterranean Cup: 1953–58
