= Enrique Mas =

Spanish footballer

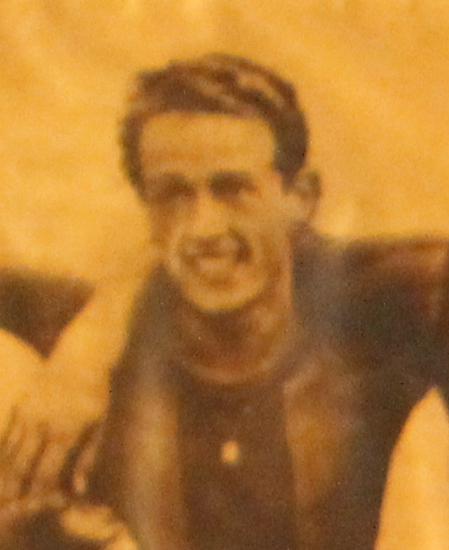
- Mas in 1928

Personal information
- Full name: Enrique Mas Mirandes
- Birth name: Enric Mas i Mirandes
- Date of birth: 27 September 1906
- Place of birth: Palafrugell, Catalonia, Spain
- Date of death: 15 February 1975 (aged 68)
- Place of death: Barcelona, Catalonia, Spain
- Position: Defender

Senior career*
Years	Team	Apps	(Gls)
1924–1926	FC Palafrugell		
1926–1932	FC Barcelona		
1932–1935	RCD Espanyol		

International career
1933–1934	Catalonia	2	(0)
- * Club domestic league appearances and goals

Enrique Mas Mirandes (27 September 1906 – 15 February 1975) was a Spanish footballer who played as a defender for FC Barcelona and RCD Espanyol.

== Playing career ==
=== Club career ===
Born on 27 September 1906 in Palafrugell, Mas began his career in his hometown club FC Palafrugell in 1924, at the age of 18, where he stood as a defender. In 1926, he signed by FC Barcelona, making his debut on 24 September in a friendly match against WAC in Vienna. He remained loyal to for Barça for six seasons, scoring 3 goals in 161 matches, and winning the 1929 La Liga, five championships of Catalonia, and the 1928 Copa del Rey, which needed three games to decide the to decide the winners as the first two ended in draws, with Mas starting in all of them.

In January 1933, Mas signed for RCD Espanyol, with whom he played until 1934. He became famous for what was called "the English jump", an acrobatic jump with which he pushed the ball away more forcefully.

=== International career ===
As a Barça player, Mas was eligible to play for the Catalan national team, making his debut on 27 August 1933, in a friendly against a Budapest XI, helping his side to a 3–1 win. In the following year, on 29 June 1934, he earned his second cap for Catalonia in a charity match against Athletic Bilbao, in which Mas "prevented the success of the Bilbao attack" in an eventual 5–1 win.

== Death ==
Mas died in Barcelona on 15 February 1975, at the age of 68.

== Honours ==
Barcelona

- La Liga:
  - Champions (1): 1929
- Copa del Rey:
  - Champions (1): 1928
- Campionat de Catalunya:
  - Champions (5): 1926–27, 1927–28, 1929–30, 1930–31, 1931–32
