= Andrés Bosch =

Spanish footballer (1903–1978)

Personal information
- Full name: Andrés Bosch Girona
- Birth name: Andreu Bosch i Girona
- Date of birth: 1 August 1903
- Place of birth: Barcelona, Catalonia, Spain
- Date of death: 5 July 1978 (aged 74)
- Place of death: Barcelona, Catalonia, Spain
- Position: Defender

Senior career*
Years	Team	Apps	(Gls)
1921–1922	CE Júpiter		
1922–1929	FC Barcelona		
1929–1930	RCD Espanyol		

International career
1929	Catalonia	1	(0)
- * Club domestic league appearances and goals

Andrés Bosch Girona (1 August 1903 – 5 July 1978) was a Spanish footballer who played as a defender for FC Barcelona. He is the father of Andreu Bosch, who also played football for Barça during the 1950s.

== Playing career ==
Born on 1 August 1903 in Barcelona, Bosch began his career in his hometown club CE Júpiter in 1921, at the age of 18, where he stood as a defender. In 1922, he was signed by FC Barcelona, being a member of the club's first golden age, winning five consecutive Catalan championships between 1923 and 1928, and three Copa del Reys, including the famous championship of 1928, in which Barcelona won the final at Real Sociedad in the third game by 3–1, after having tied the first two games to 1 goal. He was one of the members of the team that won the inaugural edition of La Liga in 1929, despite playing only three games, making his league debut against Arenas de Getxo on 3 March 1929, drawing at 2. He left Barça at the end of this season, having played a total of 209 matches, including 42 official matches. He then returned to Jupiter, where he played one season before retiring in 1931, at the age of 28.

On 30 June 1929, Bosch played his only match for the Catalan national team against his former club Barcelona, in a tribute match to Genís Viñas, keeping a clean-sheet in a goalless draw.

His son Andreu Bosch i Pujol was also a footballer for Barça de les Cinc Copes during the 1950s.

== Death ==
Bosch died in Barcelona on 5 July 1978, at the age of 74.

== Honours ==
Barcelona

- La Liga:
  - Champions (1): 1929
- Copa del Rey:
  - Champions (3): 1925, 1926, and 1928
- Campionat de Catalunya:
  - Champions (5): 1923–24, 1924–25, 1925–26, 1926–27, 1927–28
