= Antonio Arrillaga =

Spanish footballer (1900–1963)

Personal information
- Full name: Antonio Arrillaga Izaguirre
- Date of birth: 11 March 1900
- Place of birth: San Sebastián, Basque Country, Spain
- Date of death: 15 June 1963 (aged 63)
- Position: Defender

Senior career*
Years	Team	Apps	(Gls)
1917–1929	Real Sociedad		

International career
1927	Spain	1	(0)
- * Club domestic league appearances and goals

Antonio Arrillaga Izaguirre (11 March 1900 – 15 June 1963) was a Spanish footballer who played as a defender for Real Sociedad and the Spanish national team. A historical member of Real Sociedad in the inter-war period, he played his entire 12-year career at Sociedad, thus being a member of the so-called one-club men group. He later worked as a referee in the 1935–36 Spanish First Division.

== Club career ==
Antonio Arrillaga was born in San Sebastián on 11 March 1900, and he began his football career in 1917, aged 17, playing at Real Sociedad, where he remained for the next 12 years, until 1929, being a member of the Sociedad squad that won four Gipuzkoa Championships in the 1920s (1922–23, 1924–25, 1926–27, 1928–29). In total, he scored five goals 86 official matches; however, other sources state that he scored only a single goal, a penalty kick against Real Madrid at the Chamartín, in a Torneo de Campeones match on 1 November 1927, which ended in a 2–1 loss.

A few years after retiring, Arrillaga became a referee, officiating a total of eight official matches in 1935 and 1936, including six in the Segunda División and two in the 1935–36 Spanish First Division, the latter of which being a 3–3 draw between Real Madrid and Sevilla at the Chamartín.

== International career ==
On 22 May 1927, the 27-year-old Arrillaga earned his first (and only) international cap for Spain in a friendly match against France at Colombes, helping his side to a 4–1 win.

== Death ==
Arrillaga died on 15 June 1963, at the age of 63.

== Honours ==
Real Sociedad

- Gipuzkoa Championship: 1918–19, 1922–23, 1924–25, 1926–27, 1928–29
