= Campos de Sport de El Sardinero =

Football stadium in Santander, Spain

El Sardinero
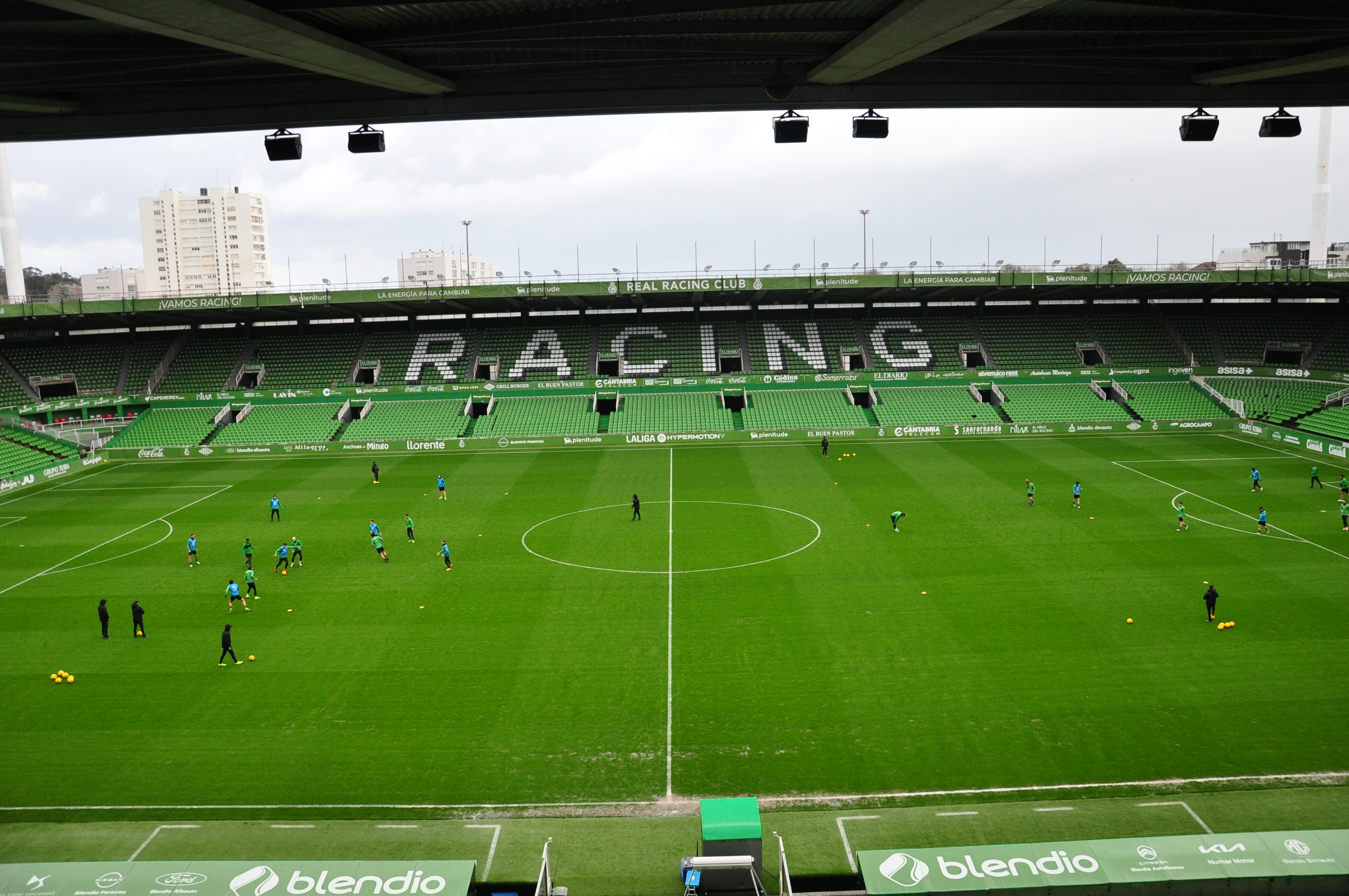
- Interactive map of El Sardinero
- Location: Santander, Spain
- Coordinates: 43°28′35″N 3°47′36″W
- Owner: Santander City Council
- Operator: Racing de Santander
- Capacity: 22,308
- Record attendance: 33,000 (Racing v Español; 29 June 1993)
- Field size: 105 metres (115 yd) x 68 metres (74 yd)

Construction
- Opened: 1988
- Architect: Tim-Oliver Wagner

Tenants
- Racing de Santander (1988–present); Spain national football team (selected matches)

Campos de Sport de El Sardinero ("El Sardinero Sport Fields"), or simply El Sardinero, is a sports complex in Santander, Spain. The football stadium, which is named Estadio El Sardinero, is currently used mostly for football matches, serving as the home ground of the La Liga side Racing de Santander since its inauguration in 1988, after replacing the old Estadio El Sardinero. With a capacity of 22,308 seats, it is the 29th-largest stadium in Spain and the largest in Cantabria.

== International matches ==
=== Spain national team matches ===
Data	Opponent	Score	Competition	Notes
17 April 1927	Switzerland	1–0	Friendly	Old El Sardinero Stadium
27 March 1991	Hungary	2–4	Friendly	
9 September 1992	England	1–0	Friendly	
3 June 1998	Northern Ireland	4-1	Friendly	
9 October 2004	Belgium	2–0	2006 FIFA World Cup qualification	
3 September 2005	Canada	2-1	Friendly	
4 June 2008	United States	1-0	Friendly	
