= Kiriki =

Spanish footballer

Personal information
- Full name: Luis Iruretagoyena Aiestarán
- Date of birth: 21 June 1907
- Place of birth: Zarautz, Spain
- Date of death: 19 October 1965 (aged 58)
- Position: Forward

International career
Years	Team	Apps	(Gls)
- Spain

Luis Iruretagoyena Aiestarán (21 June 1907 – 19 October 1965), known as Kiriki, was a Spanish footballer who played as a forward. He competed in the men's tournament at the 1928 Summer Olympics.
