= Trino Arizcorreta =

Spanish footballer

Trino
Personal information
- Full name: Trino Arizcorreta Sein
- Date of birth: 7 October 1902
- Place of birth: San Sebastián, Spain
- Date of death: 25 October 1964 (aged 62)
- Position: Midfielder

Senior career*
Years	Team	Apps	(Gls)
- Real Sociedad

International career
1928	Spain	3	(0)
- * Club domestic league appearances and goals

Trino Arizcorreta Sein (7 October 1902 – 25 October 1964) was a Spanish footballer. He competed in the men's tournament at the 1928 Summer Olympics. He played club football for Real Sociedad in La Liga.
