= Domingo Zaldúa =

Spanish footballer

Personal information
- Full name: Domingo Zaldúa Anabitarte
- Date of birth: 10 July 1903
- Place of birth: San Sebastián, Spain
- Date of death: 17 June 1986 (aged 82)
- Place of death: San Sebastián, Spain
- Position: Defender

Senior career*
| Years | Team | Apps | (Gls) |
| 1923–1930 | Real Sociedad | 15 | (0) |

International career
| 1927–1928 | Spain | 5 | (4) |
- * Club domestic league appearances and goals

Domingo Zaldúa Anabitarte (10 July 1903 – 17 June 1986) was a Spanish international footballer who played as a defender.

Born in San Sebastián, he spent his entire career from 1923 to 1930 with his hometown club, Real Sociedad. He played in all three editions of the 1928 Copa del Rey Final against FC Barcelona, and scored in the second replay on 29 June, although Sociedad lost 3–1.

He made his international debut on 22 May 1927 in a friendly away to France, scoring two penalties in a 5–1 victory. He was selected for the 1928 Olympics in Amsterdam, and opened the scoring in their quarter-final 1–1 draw with Italy. The 7–1 defeat in the replay was his last appearance for Spain.

== International goals ==
Scores and results list Spain's goal tally first.

| No. | Date | Venue | Opponent | Score | Result | Competition |
|---|---|---|---|---|---|---|
| 1. | 22 May 1927 | Stade Olympique, Colombes, France | France | 1–1 | 4–1 | Friendly |
| 2. | 22 May 1927 | Stade Olympique, Colombes, France | France | 4–1 | 4–1 | Friendly |
| 3. | 8 January 1928 | Estádio do Lumiar, Lisbon, Portugal | Portugal | 1–1 | 2–2 | Friendly |
| 4. | 1 June 1928 | Olympisch Stadion, Amsterdam, Netherlands | Italy | 1–0 | 1–1 | 1928 Summer Olympics |

== Honours ==
Real Sociedad

- Copa del Rey: Runner-up 1928
