= Severiano Goiburu =

Spanish footballer (1906–1982)

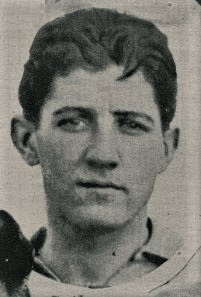

Personal information
- Full name: Severiano Goiburu Lopetegui
- Date of birth: 8 November 1906
- Place of birth: Pamplona, Spain
- Date of death: 31 July 1982 (aged 75)
- Position: Midfielder

Youth career
- –1925: Osasuna

Senior career*
Years	Team	Apps	(Gls)
1925–1929	Osasuna	44	(25)
1929–1934	Barcelona	111	(53)
1934–1937	Valencia	35	(9)
1937–1938	Espanyol	4	(0)
1938–1941	Valencia	17	(1)
1941–1942	Levante	10	(1)
1942–1943	Real Murcia	1	(1)

International career
1920–1936	Spain	12	(5)
- * Club domestic league appearances and goals

Severiano Goiburu Lopetegui (8 November 1906 – 31 July 1982) was a Spanish footballer who played for the Spain national team. He played for many clubs in La Liga, most notably Barcelona. He is known for scoring the decisive goal in the 1929 Spain v England football match.

== Club career ==
Goiburu spent his entire club career in the Spanish first division, including FC Barcelona for five seasons. He moved to the Catalan club from Osasuna for a fee of 25,000 pesetas (€150) in 1929, following the match against England.

== International career ==
Goiburu made his first appearance for Spain against Hungary on 19 December 1926. On 15 May 1929, Spain played a friendly match against England, who were widely considered to be the best football team at the time. They had previously beaten France and Belgium 4–1 and 5–1 respectively. However, Spain ended up upsetting the Three Lions and won the match 4–3. Goiburu had scored the decisive goal in the 82nd minute to give Spain the victory, despite being the only amateur footballer on the pitch. He won 12 caps and scored 5 goals in total for his national team.

== Career statistics ==
Scores and results list Spain's goal tally first, score column indicates score after each Goiburu goal.

List of international goals scored by Severiano Goiburu
No.	Date	Venue	Opponent	Score	Result	Competition
1	19 December 1926	Campo de Coia, Vigo, Spain	Hungary	2–0	4–2	Friendly
2	8 January 1928	Estádio do Lumiar, Lisbon, Portugal	Portugal	2–1	2–2	Friendly
3	14 April 1929	Estadio Torrero, Zaragoza, Spain	France	5–0	8–1	Friendly
4	14 April 1929	Estadio Torrero, Zaragoza, Spain	France	7–0	8–1	Friendly
5	15 May 1929	Metropolitano, Madrid, Spain	England	4–3	4–3	Friendly
