= Martín Marculeta =

Spanish footballer

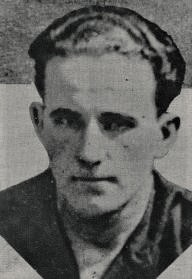
- Marculeta in a publication from 1929

Personal information
- Full name: Martín Marculeta Barbería
- Date of birth: 24 September 1907
- Place of birth: San Sebastián, Spain
- Date of death: 19 November 1984 (aged 77)
- Place of death: San Sebastián, Spain
- Position: Midfielder

Senior career*
| Years | Team | Apps | (Gls) |
| 1924–1934 | Real Sociedad | 106 | (4) |
| 1934–1936 | Atlético de Madrid | 41 | (9) |

International career
| 1928–1935 | Spain | 15 | (1) |

Managerial career
- 1942–1943: Sporting de Gijón
- * Club domestic league appearances and goals

Martín Marculeta Barbería (born 24 September 1907 in San Sebastián; died 19 November 1984) was a Spanish association footballer. During his career he played for Real Sociedad (1924–1934) and Atlético de Madrid (1934–1936), earned 15 caps and scored one goal for the Spain national team in a 7–1 rout against Mexico, an Olympian and played 1934 FIFA World Cup. His younger brother José María was also a top-level footballer, but their careers did not overlap as there was a 13-year difference in age between them.

== Career ==
Born in San Sebastián, Marculeta began playing youth football with local side Amaikak Mutillak. In 1924, he joined Real Sociedad where he would play for ten seasons. He was involved in the club's epic 1928 Copa del Rey Final loss to FC Barcelona which required two replays.

== 1928 Amsterdam Summer Games ==
He played on the team sent to the 1928 Amsterdam Summer Olympics.
