= Luis Marín (footballer, born 1906) =

Spanish-Basque footballer (1906–1974)

Personal information
- Full name: Luis Marín Sabater
- Date of birth: 4 September 1906
- Place of birth: Ordizia, Spain
- Date of death: 21 December 1974 (aged 68)
- Position: Striker

Senior career*
Years	Team	Apps	(Gls)
1928–1936	Atlético Madrid	129	(49)
1939–1941	Real Madrid	25	(5)
1941–1945	Granada	84	(33)
1945–1947	Antequerano		
1947–1948	Ceuta		
- * Club domestic league appearances and goals

Luis Marín Sabater (4 September 1906 – 21 December 1974) was a Spanish-Basque football player of the 1930s and 1940s.

A native of the Basque town of Ordizia (since the 1979 Statute of Gernika, a part of autonomous Basque Country), he was a striker for Real Madrid CF between 1936 and 1941. Before joining Real Madrid, he was a player for Atlético Madrid, and he later played for Granada CF.

He was a member of the Spain squad at the 1934 FIFA World Cup, but did not play, and never made his international debut.

His son, Luis Marín Garcia, was also a footballer, who played as a midfielder for Rayo Vallecano and Celta Vigo in the 1950s.
