= Ángel Mariscal =

Spanish footballer

Personal information
- Full name: Ángel Mariscal Beuba
- Date of birth: 17 August 1904
- Place of birth: San Sebastián, Spain
- Date of death: 20 March 1979 (aged 74)

Senior career*
Years	Team	Apps	(Gls)
	Real Sociedad	47	(9)

International career
1928	Spain	2	(1)
- * Club domestic league appearances and goals

Ángel Mariscal Beuba (17 August 1904 — 20 March 1979) was a Spanish footballer who competed in the men's tournament at the 1928 Summer Olympics.
