= Ramón Llorens =

Spanish footballer and coach

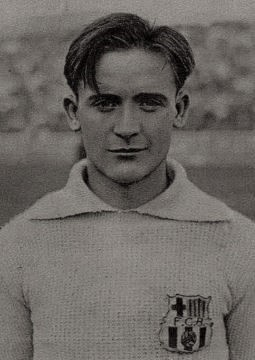

Personal information
- Full name: Ramón Llorens Pujadas
- Date of birth: 1 November 1906
- Place of birth: Barcelona, Spain
- Date of death: 4 February 1985 (aged 78)
- Height: 1.64 m (5 ft 5 in)
- Position: Goalkeeper

Senior career*
Years	Team	Apps	(Gls)
1926–1938	Barcelona	86	(0)
Total		86	(0)

Managerial career
- 1950: Barcelona
- * Club domestic league appearances and goals

Ramón Llorens Pujadas (1 November 1906 – 4 February 1985) was a Spanish professional football player and coach.

== Career ==
Born in Barcelona, Llorens played as a goalkeeper for Barcelona between 1926 and 1938, making 86 first team appearances in all competitions. At 1.64m tall, he is the shortest goalkeeper in the club's history. He later worked for the club as a coach spending 53 years with the club. He also managed the club in 1950.

He also fought in the Spanish Civil War.
