= Cholín =

Spanish footballer (1906–1967)

- Cholín in 1931

Personal information
- Full name: Ignacio María Alcorta Hermoso
- Date of birth: 13 December 1906
- Place of birth: Tolosa, Spain
- Date of death: 30 November 1967 (aged 60)
- Place of death: Granada, Spain

Senior career*
Years	Team	Apps	(Gls)
1925–1927	Tolosa		
1927–1940	Real Sociedad	95+	(53+)
1940–1942	Granada	5+	(1+)

International career
1928	Spain	1	(0)

Managerial career
- 1943–1944: Alaves
- 1945–1946: Granada
- 1948–1950: Granada
- 1950–1951: Real Jaén
- 1951: Granada
- * Club domestic league appearances and goals

Ignacio María Alcorta Hermoso, nicknamed Cholín, (13 December 1906 – 30 November 1967) was a Spanish footballer who played as a forward. He competed in the men's tournament at the 1928 Summer Olympics, winning his sole international cap in the competition.

At club level he played for local side Tolosa CF, Real Sociedad – where he scored 53 goals in La Liga and 136 overall, and finished on the losing side in the 1928 Copa del Rey Final – and Granada CF. He later had spells as manager at Deportivo Alavés, Real Jaén and three appointments at Granada, where he settled to live until his death in 1967.
