= Estadio El Sardinero (1913) =

Stadium in Santander, Cantabria, Spain

- El Sardinero
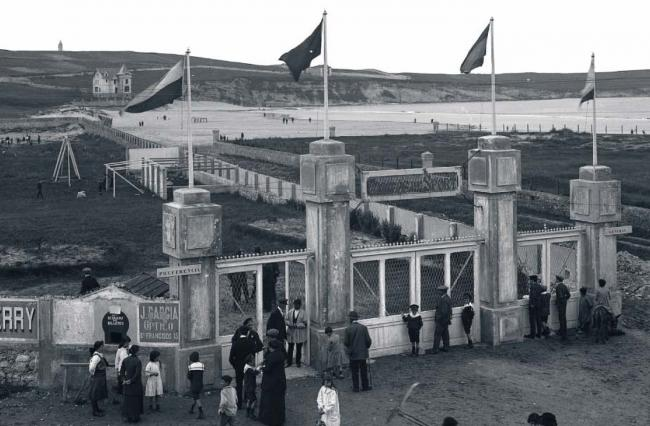
- "Campos de Sport de El Sardinero" stadium, early 20th century
- Interactive map of Estadio El Sardinero
- Full name: Estadio El Sardinero
- Location: Santander, Spain
- Coordinates: 43.47689°N 3.78964°W
- Owner: Racing de Santander
- Operator: Racing de Santander
- Capacity: 20,000
- Surface: Grass

Construction
- Opened: 1913
- Closed: 1988
- Demolished: 1988

Tenant
- Racing de Santander (1913–1988)

The Estadio El Sardinero was a multi-use stadium in Santander, Spain. It was initially used as the stadium of Racing de Santander matches. It was replaced by the current Estadio El Sardinero in 1988. The capacity of the stadium was 20,000 spectators. In 1928, the stadium hosted the infamous Copa del Rey final between Barcelona and Real Sociedad, which needed 3 matches to decide the winners as the first two ended in 1–1 draws. Barcelona won 3–1 in the third match and the entire competition.
