= Ramón Guzmán =

Spanish footballer and manager

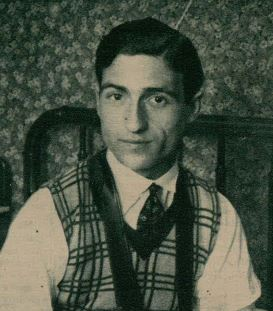
- Guzmán in 1929.

Personal information
- Full name: Ramón Guzmán Carbonell
- Date of birth: 22 January 1907
- Place of birth: Barcelona, Spain
- Date of death: 1 April 1954 (aged 47)
- Position: Midfielder

Senior career*
Years	Team	Apps	(Gls)
1928–1935	Barcelona	45	(1)
1935	Mallorca		

International career
1930	Spain	3	(0)

Managerial career
- 1941–1942: Barcelona
- * Club domestic league appearances and goals

Ramón Guzmán Carbonell (22 January 1907 – 1 April 1954) was a Spanish football player and manager.

== Career ==
Born in Barcelona, Guzmán played for Barcelona between 1928 and 1935. After leaving Barcelona, he played for RCD Mallorca.

Guzmán made three appearances for the Spain national football team during 1930.

After he retired from playing, Guzmán became a football coach. He managed Barcelona during the 1941–42 season.
