= FC Palafrugell =

- Full name: Fútbol Club Palafrugell
- Founded: 1920
- Ground: Josep Pla i Arbonès; Palafrugell, Spain
- Capacity: 4,000
- President: (Spain) Rodolf Saval
- Head coach: (Spain) Sergi Luís Cruz 'Sepu'
- League: Segona Catalana – Group 1
- 2024–25: Segona Catalana – Group 1, 11th of 16
- Website: http://www.fcpalafrugell.cat/
Home colours	Away colours

Fútbol Club Palafrugell is a football team based in Palafrugell, Girona, Catalonia, Spain. Founded in 1920, it plays in Segona Catalana – Group 1. Its stadium is Josep Pla i Arbonès, with a capacity of 4,000.

== History ==
In 1910, Ateneu Palafrugellenc was founded. It was a multisport club chaired by Josep Barceló i Matas and was best known for its football. The club was disbanded in 1919.
In 1920 Fútbol Club Palafrugell was founded. Their best years came in the 2000s when they played six seasons in the Tercera División.
Alfredo Di Stefano played his first match in Spain with FC Palafrugell in a pre-season match against FC Barcelona amateur on 19 July 1953.

== Season to season ==
Season	Tier	Division	Place	Copa del Rey
1928–29	5	2ª Reg. P.	2nd	
1929–30	5	2ª Reg. P.	4th	
1930–31	5	2ª Reg. P.	2nd	
1931–32	4	1ª Reg.	6th	
1932–33	3	3ª	3rd	
1933–34	4	1ª Reg.	7th	
1934–35	5	1ª Reg. B		
1935–36	5	1ª Reg. B		
1939–1943	DNP			
1943–44	6	2ª Reg.	1st	
1944–45	6	2ª Reg. P.	5th	
1945–46	5	1ª Reg. B	6th	
1946–47	5	2ª Reg.	2nd	
1947–48	4	1ª Reg. A	8th	
1948–49	6	2ª Reg.	6th	
1949–50	6	2ª Reg.		
1950–51	6	2ª Reg.		
1951–52	6	2ª Reg.	4th	
1952–53	5	1ª Reg. B	8th	
1953–54	5	2ª Reg.	6th	

Season	Tier	Division	Place	Copa del Rey
1954–55	5	2ª Reg.	1st	
1955–56	5	2ª Reg.	3rd	
1956–57	4	1ª Reg.	4th	
1957–58	4	1ª Reg.	5th	
1958–59	4	1ª Reg.	18th	
1959–60	4	1ª Reg.	11th	
1960–61	4	1ª Reg.	16th	
1961–62	4	1ª Reg.	5th	
1962–63	4	1ª Reg.	4th	
1963–64	4	1ª Reg.	2nd	
1964–65	3	3ª	16th	
1965–66	4	1ª Reg.	2nd	
1966–67	4	1ª Reg.	1st	
1967–68	3	3ª	14th	
1968–69	3	3ª	19th	
1969–70	4	Reg. Pref.	6th	
1970–71	4	Reg. Pref.	9th	
1971–72	4	Reg. Pref.	19th	
1972–73	5	1ª Reg.	3rd	
1973–74	5	1ª Reg.	7th	

Season	Tier	Division	Place	Copa del Rey
1974–75	5	1ª Reg.	16th	
1975–76	6	2ª Reg.	1st	
1976–77	5	1ª Reg.	13th	
1977–78	6	1ª Reg.	19th	
1978–79	7	2ª Reg.	6th	
1979–80	7	2ª Reg.	9th	
1980–81	7	2ª Reg.	5th	
1981–82	7	2ª Reg.	1st	
1982–83	6	1ª Reg.	6th	
1983–84	6	1ª Reg.	6th	
1984–85	6	1ª Reg.	6th	
1985–86	6	1ª Reg.	8th	
1986–87	6	1ª Reg.	5th	
1987–88	6	1ª Reg.	10th	
1988–89	6	1ª Reg.	1st	
1989–90	5	Reg. Pref.	11th	
1990–91	5	Reg. Pref.	9th	
1991–92	5	1ª Cat.	1st	
1992–93	4	3ª	16th	
1993–94	4	3ª	18th	

Season	Tier	Division	Place	Copa del Rey
1994–95	5	1ª Cat.	11th	
1995–96	5	1ª Cat.	12th	
1996–97	5	1ª Cat.	9th	
1997–98	5	1ª Cat.	10th	
1998–99	5	1ª Cat.	10th	
1999–2000	5	1ª Cat.	5th	
2000–01	4	3ª	9th	
2001–02	4	3ª	6th	
2002–03	4	3ª	7th	
2003–04	4	3ª	18th	
2004–05	5	1ª Cat.	3rd	
2005–06	4	3ª	15th	
2006–07	4	3ª	20th	
2007–08	5	1ª Cat.	19th	
2008–09	6	Pref. Terr.	6th	
2009–10	6	Pref. Terr.	7th	
2010–11	6	Pref. Terr.	16th	
2011–12	6	2ª Cat.	2nd	
2012–13	6	2ª Cat.	17th	
2013–14	7	3ª Cat.	14th	

Season	Tier	Division	Place	Copa del Rey
2014–15	7	3ª Cat.	7th	
2015–16	7	3ª Cat.	1st	
2016–17	6	2ª Cat.	10th	
2017–18	6	2ª Cat.	15th	
2018–19	7	3ª Cat.	5th	
2019–20	7	3ª Cat.	2nd	
2020–21	6	2ª Cat.	9th	
2021–22	7	2ª Cat.	11th	
2022–23	8	3ª Cat.	2nd	
2023–24	8	2ª Cat.	10th	
2024–25	8	2ª Cat.	11th	
2025–26	8	2ª Cat.		

- 12 seasons in Tercera División

== Notable players ==
- (Spain) Narcís Martí Filosia
