= Amadeo Labarta =

Spanish footballer

Amadeo
Personal information
- Full name: Amadeo Labarta Rey
- Date of birth: 31 March 1905
- Place of birth: Pasajes, Spain
- Date of death: 30 July 1989 (aged 84)

Senior career*
Years	Team	Apps	(Gls)
1925–1936	Real Sociedad	114	(4)

International career
1928	Spain	3	(0)

Managerial career
- 1943–1944: Burgos CF
- 1946–1948: Osasuna
- * Club domestic league appearances and goals

Amadeo Labarta Rey (31 March 1905 – 30 July 1989) was a Spanish footballer. He competed in the men's tournament at the 1928 Summer Olympics.
