= Ángel Arocha =

Spanish footballer

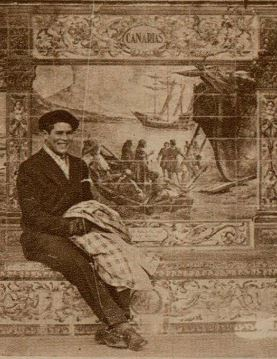
- Ángel Arocha in 1929

Personal information
- Full name: Ángel Arocha Guillén
- Date of birth: 23 June 1907
- Place of birth: Tenerife, Spain
- Date of death: 2 September 1938 (aged 31)
- Place of death: Balaguer, Spain
- Position: Forward

Senior career*
Years	Team	Apps	(Gls)
1925–1927	Tenerife	77	(73)
1927–1933	Barcelona	99	(85)
1933–1936	Atlético Madrid	32	(7)

International career
1931	Spain	2	(2)
- * Club domestic league appearances and goals

Angel Arocha Guillen (23 June 1907 – 2 September 1938), commonly known as Arocha, was a Spanish footballer who played as a forward. Arocha began his career with CD Tenerife where, along with Bernardino Semán and Joaquín Cárdenes, he formed a formidable attacking trio.

Arocha signed for FC Barcelona for 750 pesetas a month during the 1926-27 season, playing for the team between 1927 and 1933. He was charged with formidable task of replacing the retiring Paulino Alcántara. Arocha scored 215 goals in 207 official and friendly matches with Barça, winning a Copa del Rey (1928) and a La Liga title (1929). After playing for Barça he moved to Atlético de Aviación.

Despite having left his home of Tenerife to play for Barça, Arocha was still treated with great admiration by the people of the island. After winning the first La Liga title in history with Barça, he stopped over on the island en route to South America, and upon his arrival at the dock he was acclaimed by a crowd that bestowed upon him the honors of a hero. Amid cheers and praise, the crowd carried him on their shoulders as they greeted him.

For the Spanish national team, Arocha scored on his debut, April 26, 1931, in a match where Spain drew 1-1 with Ireland. Eight months later, again against the Irish, Arocha contributed a goal in a 5-0 victory.

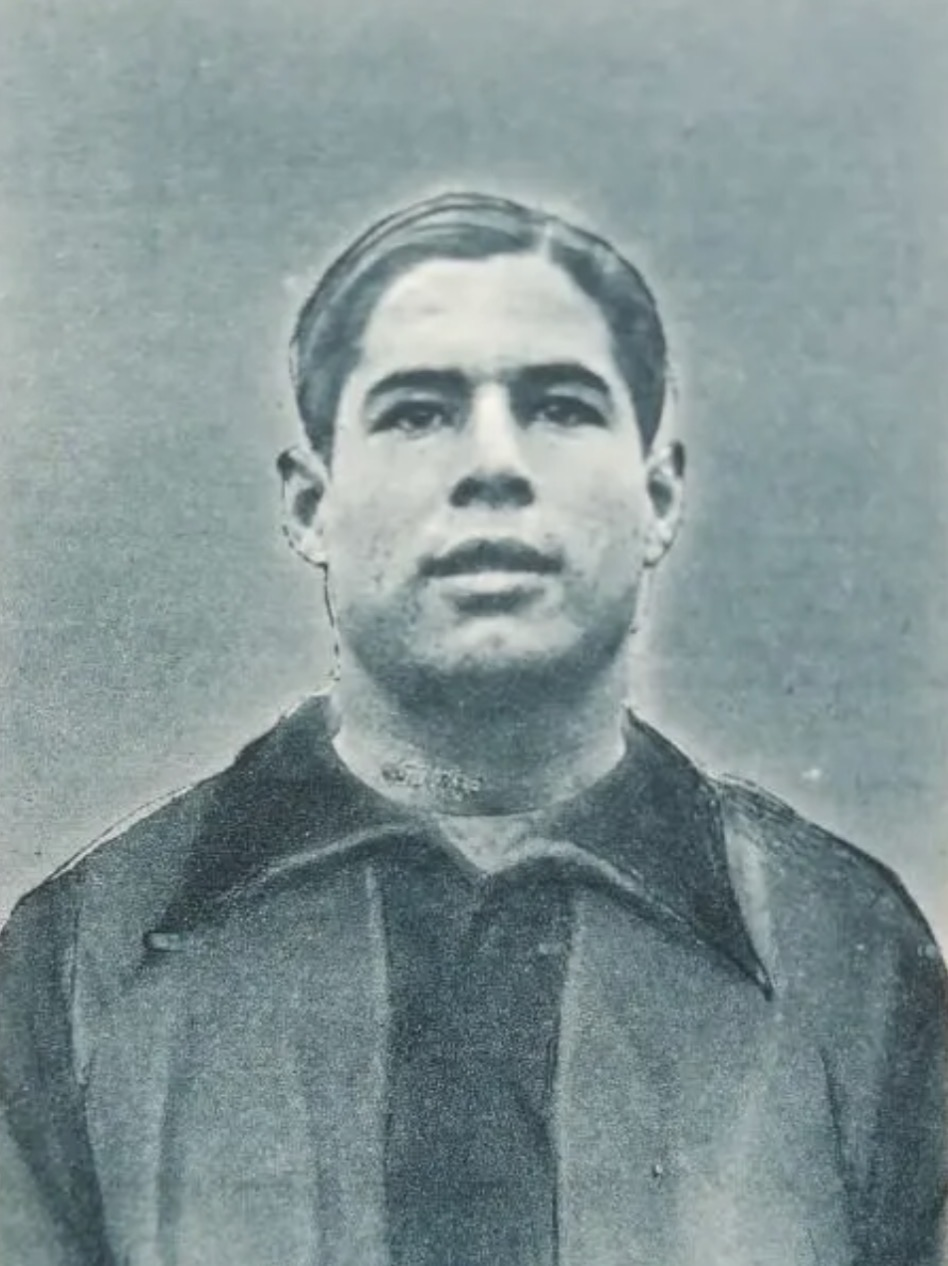
With FC Barcelona 1929-30

Serving as a volunteer in Francisco Franco’s national army during the Spanish Civil War, Arocha was killed in action during an air raid on September 2, 1938 in Balaguer.

== Honours ==
FC Barcelona

- La Liga (1): 1929
- Copa del Rey (1): 1928
