= Stadium Gal =

Football stadium in Basque Country, Spain

Coordinates: 43°20′44″N 1°47′9″W

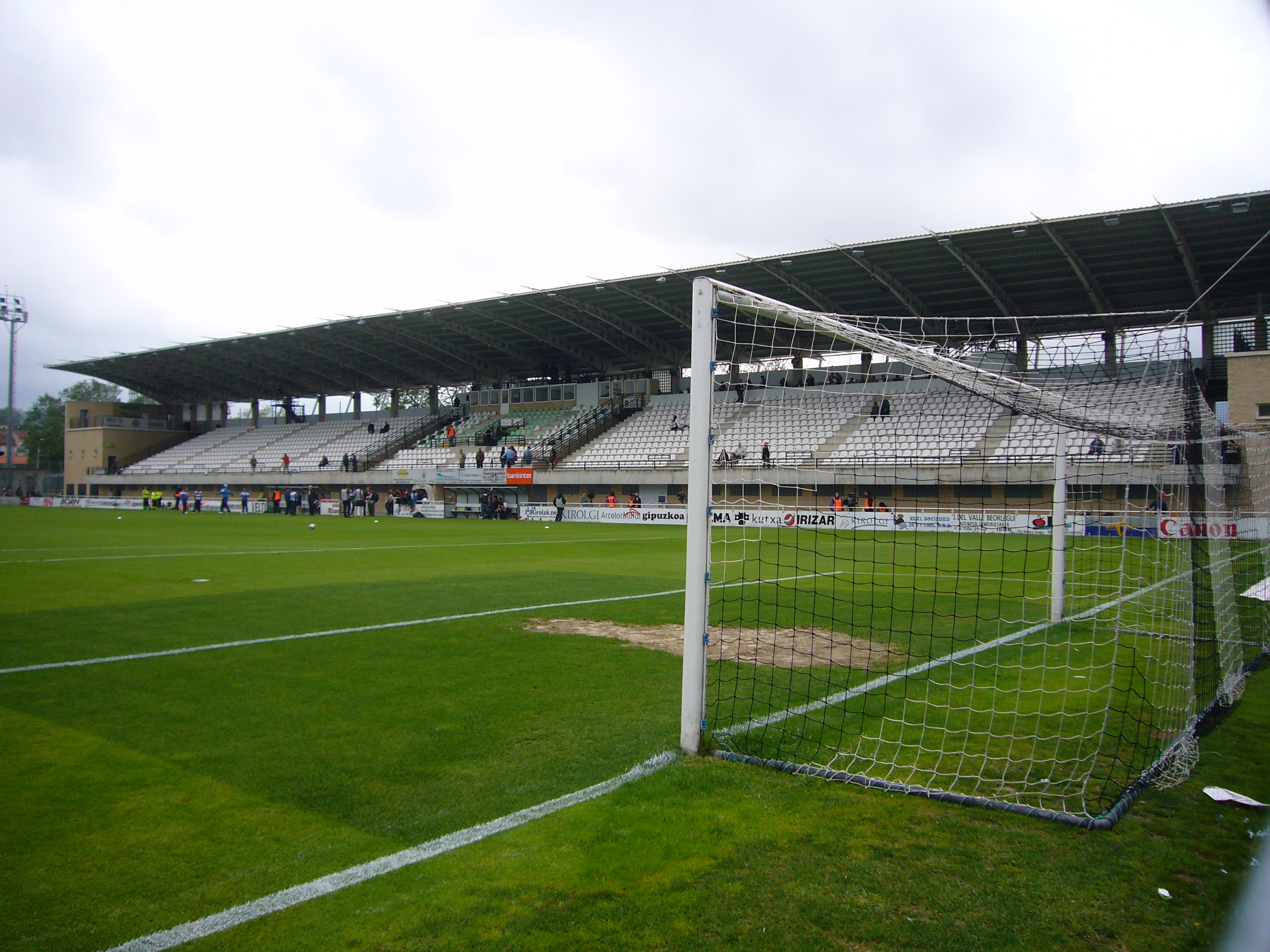
- Interactive map of Stadium Gal
- Location: Irun, Spain
- Owner: Real Unión
- Capacity: 5,500
- Surface: Grass

Construction
- Opened: September 19, 1926; 100 years ago

Tenant
- Real Unión

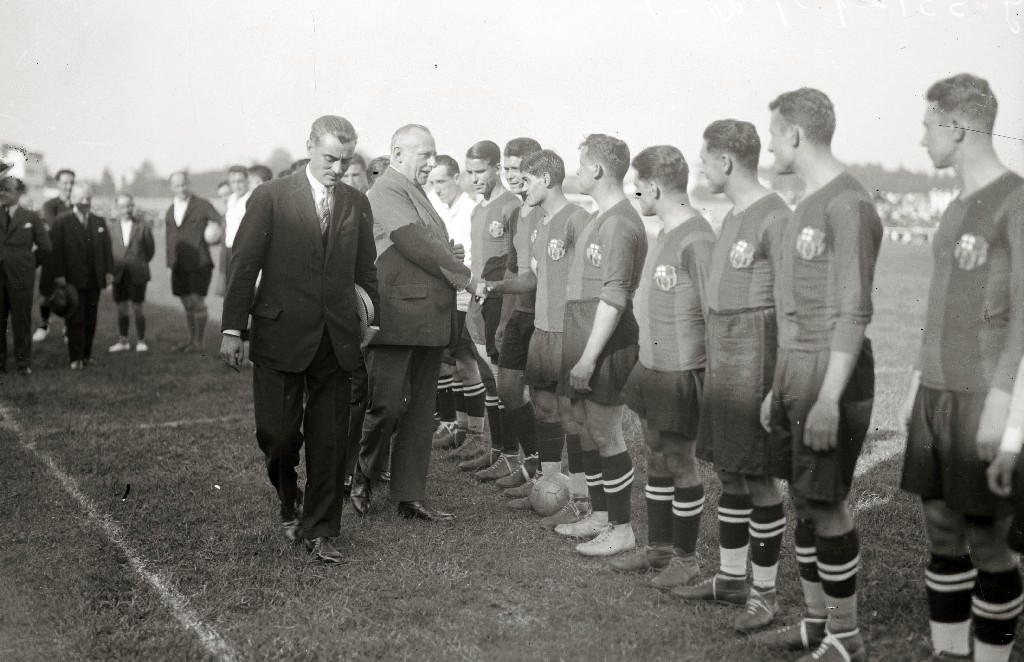
Inauguration of the stadium in 1926

Stadium Gal is a football stadium in Irun, Gipuzkoa, Basque Country, Spain. It is owned by Real Unión, currently in Segunda División B. The capacity of the stadium is 5,500 spectators.

The stadium is located on the left bank of the Bidasoa river, which forms the border between Spain and France (on the right bank is the French-Basque town of Hendaye); it is about 300 metres from the road and rail bridges which are the crossing points over the river between the nations.
