= Manuel Parera =

Spanish footballer

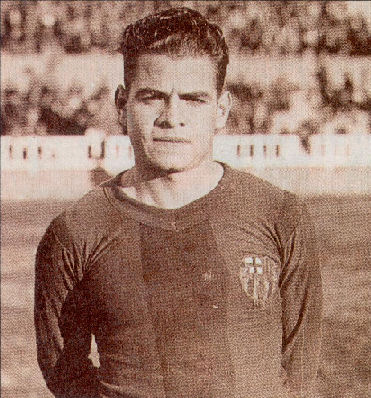

Personal information
- Full name: Manuel Parera Penella
- Date of birth: 7 October 1907
- Place of birth: Barcelona, Spain
- Date of death: 12 April 1975 (aged 67)
- Place of death: Barcelona, Spain
- Position: Forward

Senior career*
Years	Team	Apps	(Gls)
1928–1933	Barcelona	62	(14)
1934–1936	Sabadell		
1937	Girona		
1940	Badalona		
- * Club domestic league appearances and goals

Manuel Parera Penella (7 October 1907 – 12 April 1975) was a Spanish footballer who played for FC Barcelona during the 1920s and 1930s. He scored the club's first ever Primera División goal in 1929.

At the Les Corts stadium, on the second day of the championship. The Barcelona signed the final 1–2, after Madrid came forward with two goals from Tenerife Morera
