= Atotxa Stadium =

Football stadium in San Sebastián, Spain

Coordinates: 43.3195°N 1.975°W

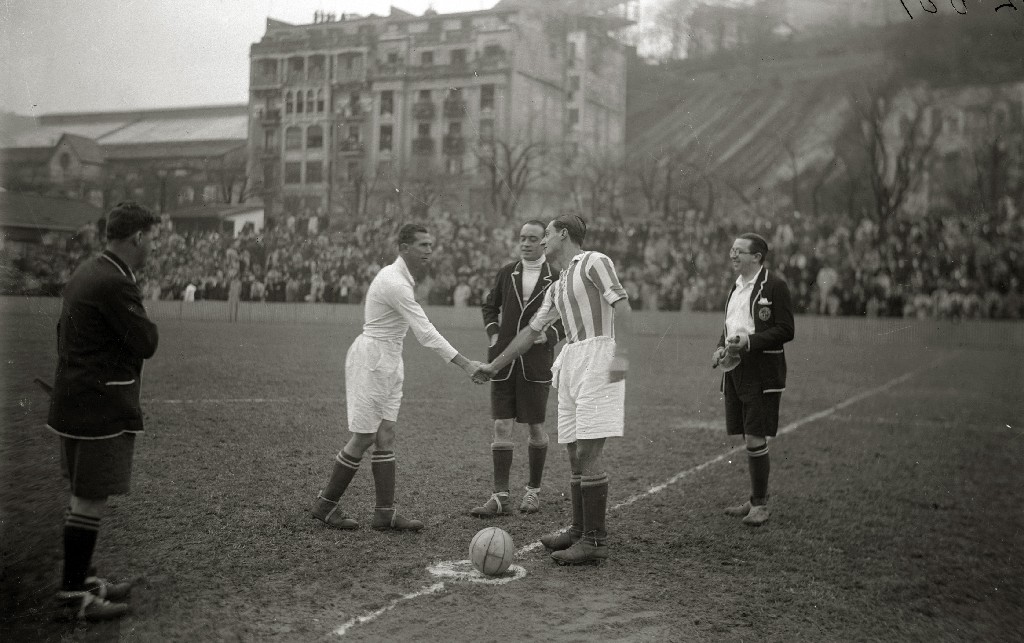
First match of Primera División in Atotxa 1929

Atotxa (Spanish: Atocha) was a football stadium in San Sebastián, Spain. It was the home ground of Real Sociedad until 1993 when it was replaced by Anoeta Stadium. It had superseded Ondarreta Stadium 80 years earlier. It had a capacity of 17,000 spectators.

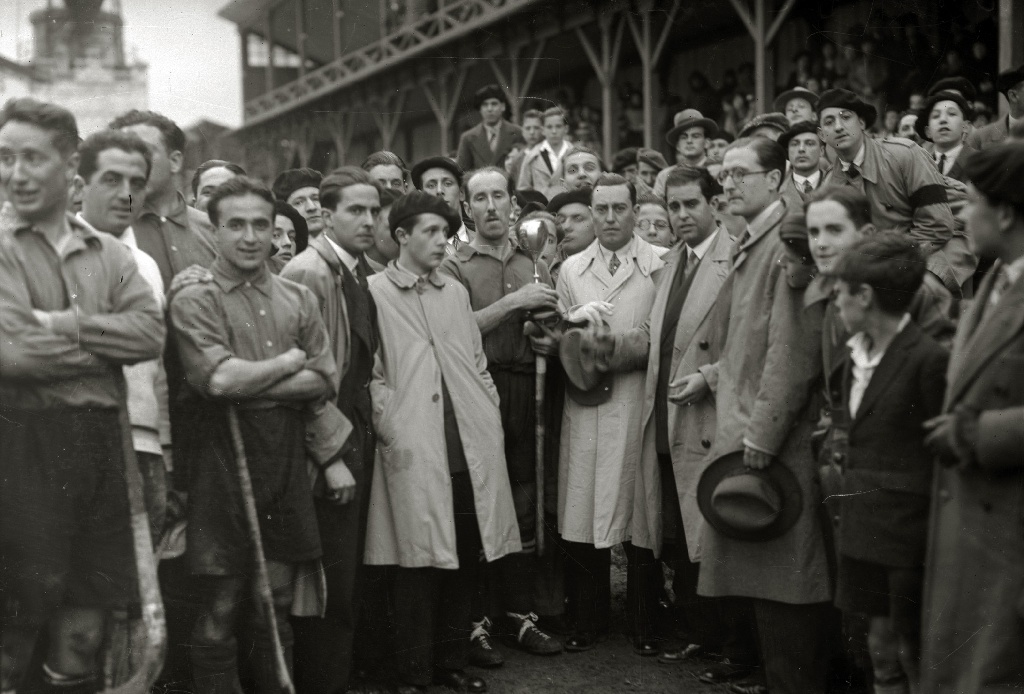
Public at Atotxa for a hockey game in 1930

== History ==
The Municipal Stadium of Atocha was the second stadium that Real Sociedad had in their history, preceded by Ondarreta, located in the neighborhood of the old town of San Sebastián. Later the team moved to the Eguia neighborhood. The stadium of Atocha was constructed in the grounds of an old velodrome, built in 1888. It was inaugurated on 5 October 1913 with a match between Real Sociedad and Athletic Club Bilbao, which finalized with a 3–3 result. The author of the first goal in Atocha was the same as that of the first match in San Mamés: the mythical player of Athletic Bilbao Rafael Moreno Aranzadi also known by his nickname "Pichichi" – the top scorer award for the Spanish Primera División bears that name in his honour.

The stadium reached an approximate capacity of 27,000 spectators. It hosted one Spain national team match in 1923.

The last goal in an official match at the stadium was scored by Real Sociedad Portuguese Midfielder, Oceano da Cruz, on 13 June 1993, in a League game against Tenerife with a final result of 3–1 for the locals. A week later, on 22 June, a game was held between Real Sociedad and the Basque Country as part of a farewell event (Atotxa had hosted one Basque team fixture against Bulgaria in 1979, as well as two Gipuzkoa team fixtures in 1915) and the final goal at the stadium was scored on that date: with the crowd still in place, the floodlights were turned off and the young son of former Real defender Javier Sagarzazu who had died suddenly aged 28 six years earlier, ran towards the goal under a spotlight and scored into the empty net.

From the 1993–94 season Real Sociedad would play in the new stadium, Anoeta. The old Atotxa stadium was still preserved for a few more years, serving as a training ground for a rugby team, before it was demolished to build public housing.

For 40 years, an ex-player of Real Sociedad, Amadeo Labarta of Pasaia was the caretaker, and had his home inside the stadium.

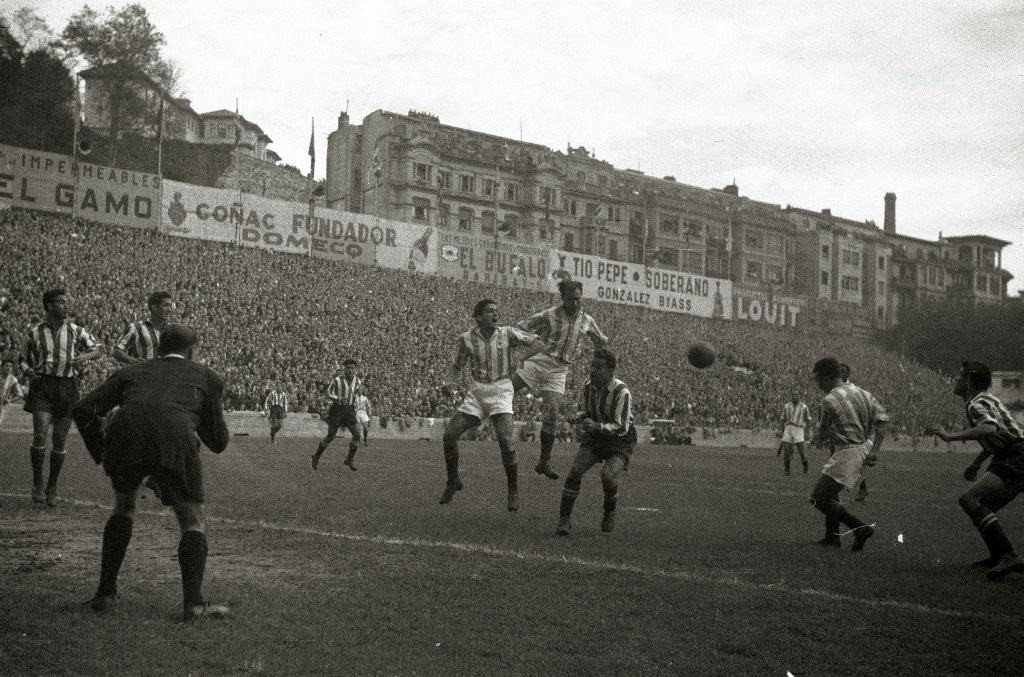
Real Sociedad game at Atotxa in 1952

At Atotxa, Real Sociedad was known for setting off a firework after an opponent scored a goal, and two fireworks after a home goal. According to popular legend, this tradition started so that seamen in the Bay of Biscay could know the results of the match without being at the ground. After a short absence, the tradition was revived following the move to Anoeta.
