= 1931–32 FC Barcelona season =

33rd season in existence of FC Barcelona

Barcelona
1931–32 season
- President: Gaspar Rosés (until October 22, 1931); Antoni Oliver (from October 22 to December 20, 1931); Joan Coma (from December 20, 1931)
- Manager: Jack Greenwell
- Stadium: Les Corts
- La Liga: 3rd
- Catalan League: Winners
- Copa del Rey: Runner-up
- Top goalscorer: League: Josep Samitier (11); All: Josep Samitier (25)

The 1931–32 season is FC Barcelona's 33rd in existence, and was their 4th year in the Primera División. It covers the period from 1931-08-01 to 1932-07-31.

FC Barcelona won the Catalan league for the 18th time, the 3rd in a row, their only title in the season.

== First-team squad ==
Note: Flags indicate national team as defined under FIFA eligibility rules; some limited exceptions apply. Players may hold more than one non-FIFA nationality.

No.	Pos.	Nation	Player
—	GK	ESP	Ramón Llorens
—	GK	BRA	Jaguaré Bezerra
—	GK	ESP	Manuel Vidal
—	GK	ESP	Juan José Nogués
—	DF	ESP	Esteban Pedrol
—	DF	ESP	Joaquín Roig
—	DF	ESP	Francisco Alcoriza
—	DF	ESP	Cristóbal Martí
—	DF	ESP	Enrique Mas
—	DF	ESP	José Saló
—	DF	ESP	Juan Rafa
—	DF	ESP	Ramón Zabalo
—	DF	ESP	Patricio Arnau
—	DF	ESP	Ramón Sanfeliu
—	MF	ESP	Fernando Diego
—	MF	ESP	Vicente Piera

No.	Pos.	Nation	Player
—	MF	ESP	Severiano Goiburu
—	MF	ESP	José Carlos Castillo
—	MF	ESP	Carlos Bestit
—	MF	BRA	Fausto dos Santos
—	MF	ESP	Ramón Guzmán
—	MF	ESP	David Gamiz
—	MF	ESP	Juan Font
—	MF	ESP	José Sastre
—	FW	ESP	Luis Cambra
—	FW	ESP	Emilio Sagi Liñán
—	FW	ESP	Josep Samitier
—	FW	ESP	Manuel Parera
—	FW	ESP	Juan Ramón
—	FW	ESP	Ángel Arocha
—	FW	ESP	Miguel Gual

== Transfers ==
=== In ===
Note: Flags indicate national team as defined under FIFA eligibility rules; some limited exceptions apply. Players may hold more than one non-FIFA nationality.

No.	Pos.	Nation	Player
—	DF	ESP	Francisco Alcoriza (from Europa)
—	GK	ESP	Manuel Vidal
—	GK	BRA	Jaguaré Bezerra
—	MF	ESP	David Gamiz (from Europa)
—	DF	ESP	Juan Rafa

No.	Pos.	Nation	Player
—	FW	ESP	Miguel Gual
—	DF	ESP	Ramón Sanfeliu
—	FW	ESP	Luis Cambra
—	MF	BRA	Fausto dos Santos

=== Out ===
Note: Flags indicate national team as defined under FIFA eligibility rules; some limited exceptions apply. Players may hold more than one non-FIFA nationality.

No.	Pos.	Nation	Player
—	GK	ESP	Juan Uriach
—	DF	ESP	Manuel Oro
—	DF	GER	Emil Walter

No.	Pos.	Nation	Player
—	DF	ESP	Conrad Portas
—	FW	ESP	Manuel García

== Competitions ==
=== La Liga ===
==== League table ====
Pos	Team	Pld	W	D	L	GF	GA	GD	Pts
2	Athletic Bilbao	18	11	3	4	47	23	+24	25
3	Barcelona	18	10	4	4	40	26	+14	24
4	Racing Santander	18	7	6	5	36	35	+1	20

==== Results by round ====
Round	1	2	3	4	5	6	7	8	9	10	11	12	13	14	15	16	17	18
Ground	A	H	A	A	H	H	A	H	A	H	A	H	H	A	A	H	A	H
Result	W	D	W	L	W	W	D	W	L	W	W	D	L	L	W	W	W	D
Position	2	2	1	3	3	2	3	2	3	3	3	3	3	3	3	3	3	3

Source: Competitive matches
A = Away; H = Home; W = Win; D = Draw; L = Loss

==== Matches ====
22 November 1931 1	Unión Club	1–3	Barcelona	Irun
	Elícegui 5'	Report	Samitier 3'; Ramón 30'; Arocha 66'	Stadium: Gal; Referee: Escartín Morán

29 November 1931 2	Barcelona	2–2	Arenas	Barcelona
	Samitier 17'; Arocha 21'	Report	Calero 14'; Fernández 36'	Stadium: Les Corts; Referee: Adrados Martín

20 December 1931 3	Espanyol	0–3	Barcelona	Barcelona
		Report	Goiburu 53'; Ramón 68'; Samitier 75'	Stadium: Sarrià; Referee: Llovera Mas

27 December 1931 4	Athletic Bilbao	3–0	Barcelona	Bilbao
	Gorostiza 11', 75'; Roberto 53'	Report		Stadium: San Mamés; Referee: Steimborn Ludeuvik

3 January 1932 5	Barcelona	4–2	Racing de Santander	Barcelona
	Arocha 7'; Mendaro 28' (o.g.); Bestit 55'; Saló 71'	Report	Zubieta 33' (pen.); Larrinaga 77'	Stadium: Les Corts; Referee: Balaguer García

10 January 1932 6	Barcelona	6–0	Alavés	Barcelona
	Ramón 2', 51', 72'; Sagi 56'; Arnau 64'; Arocha 81'	Report		Stadium: Les Corts; Referee: Escartín Morán

17 January 1932 7	Valencia	0–0	Barcelona	Valencia
		Report		Stadium: Mestalla; Referee: Balaguer García

24 January 1932 8	Barcelona	2–0	Donostia	Barcelona
	Ramón 27', 70'	Report		Stadium: Les Corts; Referee: López Espinosa

31 January 1932 9	Real Madrid	2–0	Barcelona	Madrid
	Olivares 26', 40'	Report		Stadium: Chamartín; Referee: Sanchis Orduña

7 February 1932 10	Barcelona	3–2	Unión Club	Barcelona
	Arocha 33'; Bestit 56', 86'	Report	Urtizberea 40'; Elícegui 61'	Stadium: Les Corts; Referee: Escartín Morán

14 February 1932 11	Arenas	1–3	Barcelona	Getxo
	Yermo 51'	Report	Bestit 15'; Goiburu 28'; Samitier 53'	Stadium: Ibaiondo; Referee: Sanchis Orduña

21 February 1932 12	Barcelona	2–2	Espanyol	Barcelona
	Samitier 22'; Zabalo 78' (pen.)	Report	Prat 29', 63'	Stadium: Les Corts; Referee: Melcón Bartolomé

28 February 1932 13	Barcelona	1–3	Athletic Bilbao	Barcelona
	Samitier 13'	Report	Chirri II 20'; Alcoriza 33' (o.g.); Gorostiza 69'	Stadium: Les Corts; Referee: Escartín Morán

6 March 1932 14	Racing de Santander	3–2	Barcelona	Santander
	Cisco 36', 60' (pen.), 64'	Report	Arnau 63'; Samitier 80'	Stadium: El Sardinero; Referee: Vallana Jeanguenat

13 March 1932 15	Alavés	1–3	Barcelona	Vitoria-Gasteiz
	Sañudo 8'	Report	Samitier 6', 11', 75'	Stadium: Mendizorrotza; Referee: Ledesma

20 March 1932 16	Barcelona	3–2	Valencia	Barcelona
	Arocha 19', 41'; Goiburu 44'	Report	Prieto 6'; Salvador 9'	Stadium: Les Corts; Referee: Balaguer García

27 March 1932 17	Donostia	0–1	Barcelona	San Sebastián
		Report	Piera 53'	Stadium: Atotxa; Referee: Sanchis Orduña

3 April 1932 18	Barcelona	2–2	Real Madrid	Barcelona
	Samitier 20'; Arocha 87' (pen.)	Report	Lazcano 43'; Regueiro 70'	Stadium: Les Corts; Referee: Insausti

=== Copa del Rey ===
==== Round of 16 ====
8 May 1932 First leg	Barcelona	2–0	Valencia	Barcelona
	Arocha; Samitier			Stadium: Les Corts

15 May 1932 Second leg	Valencia	2–3	Barcelona	Valencia
			Goiburu; Arocha	Stadium: Mestalla

==== Quarterfinals ====
22 May 1932 First leg	Barcelona	1–0	Donostia	Barcelona
	Arocha			Stadium: Les Corts

29 May 1932 Second leg	Donostia	1–1	Barcelona	San Sebastián
			Diego	Stadium: Atotxa

==== Semifinals ====
5 June 1932 First leg	Barcelona	3–0	Celta Vigo	Barcelona
	Ramón; Bestit			Stadium: Les Corts

12 June 1932 Second leg	Celta Vigo	2–1	Barcelona	Vigo
			Diego	Stadium: Balaídos

==== Final ====
19 June 1932
17:15 CET

Athletic Bilbao	1–0	FC Barcelona
Bata 55'

Chamartín, Madrid
Attendance: 25,000
Referee: Pedro Escartín

=== Catalan football championship ===
==== League table ====
Pos	Team	Pld	W	D	L	GF	GA	GD	Pts
1	Barcelona	14	11	1	2	44	12	+32	23
2	Espanyol	14	10	0	4	52	17	+35	20
3	Júpiter	14	8	2	4	33	22	+11	18

==== Matches ====
8 September 1931 1	Barcelona	4–2	Catalunya FC	Barcelona
	Arocha; Piera; Cambra			Stadium: Les Corts

13 September 1931 2	Júpiter	2–1	Barcelona	Barcelona
			Arocha	Stadium: La Vernenda

20 September 1931 3	Barcelona	5–0	Badalona	Barcelona
	Bestit; Goiburu; Roig; Arocha			Stadium: Les Corts

24 September 1931 4	Barcelona	0–0	Sabadell	Barcelona
				Stadium: Les Corts

27 September 1931 5	Barcelona	8–0	Palafrugell	Barcelona
	Arocha; Samitier; Piera; Ramón			Stadium: Les Corts

4 October 1931 6	Barcelona	8–1	Martinenc	Barcelona
	Samitier; Sagi; Zabalo; Goiburu			Stadium: Les Corts

11 October 1931 7	Espanyol	0–3	Barcelona	Barcelona
			Ramón; Samitier; Goiburu	Stadium: Sarrià

18 October 1931 8	Catalunya	1–3	Barcelona	Barcelona
			Goiburu; Ramón

25 October 1931 9	Barcelona	3–2	Júpiter	Barcelona
	Ramón; Samitier; Zabalo			Stadium: Les Corts

1 November 1931 10	Badalona	1–0	Barcelona	Badalona

8 November 1931 11	Sabadell	0–2	Barcelona	Sabadell
			Samitier; Goiburu	Stadium: Creu Alta

15 November 1931 12	Palafrugell	0–1	Barcelona	Palafrugell
			Samitier

1 January 1932 13	Martinenc	1–2	Barcelona	Barcelona
			Bestit; Ramón

10 February 1932 14	Barcelona	3–2	Espanyol	Barcelona
	Piera; Goiburu			Stadium: Les Corts

== Friendlies ==
Friendlies
Kick Off	Opponents	H / A	Result	Scorers
August 29, 1931	(Spain) Athletic Bilbao	H	5–1	Arocha (2), Sastre, Cambra, Ramón
August 30, 1931	(Spain) Athletic Bilbao	H	1–0	Ramón
September 13, 1931	(Spain) Madrid	H	2–2	Ramón (2)
October 3, 1931	(Spain) Sants	H	2–1	Bestit, Goiburu
October 12, 1931	(Spain) Nacional de Madrid	H	8–1	Arocha (3), Seman (2), Diego, Arnau, Bestit
November 7, 1931	(Spain) Barakaldo	H	2–2	Bestit, Seman
November 22, 1931	(Spain) Júpiter	H	2–1	Diego, Bestit
December 8, 1931	(Spain) Júpiter	A	2–2	Bestit, Goiburu
December 13, 1931	(Italy) Ambrosiana	H	3–0	Bestit (2), Ramón
December 26, 1931	(Austria) Wiener	H	4–2	Gual (2), Bestit, Gamiz
December 27, 1931	(Austria) Wiener	H	3–1	Gual (3)
February 2, 1932	(Spain) Celta de Vigo	H	5–0	Diego (2), Gual, Roig, Miró
March 3, 1932	(France) Red Star	A	1–1	Ramón
March 5, 1932	(France) Red Star	A	0–4	Arocha 2, Roig, Bestit
March 25, 1932	(Portugal) Porto/Benfica combination	A	1–2	Bestit, Freisa (o.g.)
March 27, 1932	(Portugal) Benfica	A	2–5	Roig (2), Bestit, Diego, Correira (o.g.)
April 10, 1932	(Spain) Sabadell	H	6–1	Bestit (3), Portugues (2), Gual
April 14, 1932	(Spain) Zaragoza	A	3–1	Gual
April 17, 1932	(Spain) Sabadell	A	1–2	Gual (2)
April 23, 1932	(Spain) Sevilla	H	3–2	Diego, Portugues, Parera
April 24, 1932	(Spain) Sevilla	H	3–1	Arocha (3)
May 1, 1932	(France) Sète	A	2–5	Arocha (4), Bestit
May 3, 1932	(Spain) Figueres	A	0–5	Arocha (2), Bestit, Ramón, Font
May 5, 1932	(France) Oran	A	0–10	Gual (6), Goiburu (2), Roig (29)
May 8, 1932	(France) Gallia Sports d'Alger	A	1–11	Gual (7), Goiburu (2), Roig, Diego
May 16, 1932	(France) Algeria team	A	1–5	Miró (3), Gual, Roig
May 20, 1932	(France) entente de collo	A	0–3	
May 22, 1932	(France) Sète	A	1–0	
June 24, 1932	Basque Country	H	3–1	Gual (2), Parera
June 25, 1932	Basque Country	H	2–1	Bestit, Parera
June 29, 1932	(Italy) Torino	H	3–1	Bestit 2, Arnau
July 3, 1932	(Spain) Madrid	H	2–2	Samitier (2)

== Results ==
Amistosos

29 August 1931	FC Barcelona	5 - 1	Athletic Club	Barcelona
	Arocha; Sastre; Cambra; Ramon			Stadium: Camp de les Corts; Referee: Mallorquí

30 August 1931	FC Barcelona	1 - 0	Athletic Club	Barcelona
	Ramon 30'			Stadium: Camp de les Corts; Referee: Comorera

13 September 1931	Atlético de Madrid	2 - 2	FC Barcelona	Madrid
			Ramon	Stadium: Vallecas; Referee: Angel Martin

3 October 1931	FC Barcelona	2 - 1	UE Sants	Barcelona
	Bestit 50'; Goiburu 90'			Stadium: Camp de les Corts; Referee: Pujol

12 October 1931	FC Barcelona	8 - 1	Nacional Madrid	Barcelona
	Diego; Seman; Arocha; Arnau; Bestit			Stadium: Camp de Les Corts; Referee: Sauri

7 November 1931	FC Barcelona	2 - 2	Barakaldo	Barcelona
	Bestit; Seman			Stadium: Camp de Les Corts; Referee: Marine

22 November 1931	FC Barcelona	2 - 1	CE Júpiter	Barcelona
	Diego 30'; Bestit 75'			Stadium: Camp de Les Corts; Referee: Vilalta

8 December 1931	CE Júpiter	2 - 2	FC Barcelona	Barcelona
			Bestit 16'; Goiburu 87'	Stadium: Poble Nou; Referee: Mallorquí

13 December 1931	FC Barcelona	3 - 0	Ambrosiana	Barcelona
	Bestit 4' 68'; Ramon 57'			Stadium: Camp de Les Corts; Referee: Comorera

26 December 1931	FC Barcelona	4 - 2	Wiener	Barcelona
	Bestit; Gual; Gamiz			Stadium: Camp de Les Corts; Referee: Arribas

27 December 1931	FC Barcelona	3 - 1	Wiener	Barcelona
	Gual			Stadium: Camp de Les Corts; Referee: Armengol(primera part) i Czerny(segona part)

17 January 1932	FC Barcelona	2 - 0	UE Sants	Barcelona
	Sastre 28'; Cambra 49'			Stadium: Camp de Les Corts; Referee: Espelta

2 February 1932	FC Barcelona	5 - 0	Celta	Barcelona
	Gual; Roig; Miro; Diego			Stadium: Camp de Les Corts; Referee: Comorera

3 March 1932	Red Star	1 - 1	FC Barcelona	París
			Ramon	Stadium: Buffalo; Referee: Degoutte

5 March 1932	Red Star	0 - 4	FC Barcelona	París
			Arocha 4' 60'; Roig 20'; Bestit 22'	Stadium: Buffalo; Attendance: 8.000; Referee: Girandin

25 March 1932	FC Porto i Benfica	1 - 2	FC Barcelona	Lisbon
			Bestit 5'; Freisa equip contrari 48'	Referee: Rafael Fernandes

27 March 1932	S.L. Benfica	2 - 5	FC Barcelona	Lisbon
			Corella equip contrari 10'; Roig 15' 23'; Bestit 51'; Diego 74'	Stadium: Das Amoreiras

10 April 1932	FC Barcelona	6 - 1	CE Sabadell FC	Barcelona
	Bestit; Gual; Portugues			Stadium: Les Corts; Referee: Boda

14 April 1932	Real Zaragoza	3 - 1	FC Barcelona	Zaragoza
			Gual	Stadium: Torrero; Referee: Ostale

17 April 1932	CE Sabadell FC	1 - 2	FC Barcelona	Sabadell
			Gual	Stadium: Creu Alta; Referee: Marine

23 April 1932	FC Barcelona	3 - 2	Sevilla FC	Barcelona
	Diego; Parera; Portugues			Stadium: Les Corts; Referee: Mallorquí

24 April 1932	FC Barcelona	3 - 1	Sevilla FC	Barcelona
	Arocha 6' 19' 36'			Stadium: Les Corts; Referee: Pujol

1 May 1932	Sète	2 - 5	FC Barcelona	Les Métairies
			Bestit; Arocha

3 May 1932	UE Figueres	0 - 5	FC Barcelona	Barcelona
			Bestit; Arocha; Font; Ramon	Stadium: Figueres

5 May 1932 Gira Nord d,Africa	AS Marine d'Oran	0 - 10	FC Barcelona	Oran
			Gual; Goiburu; Roig

8 May 1932 Gira Nord d,Africa	Gallia Sports d'Alger	1 - 11	FC Barcelona	Alger
			Gual; Goiburu; Roig; Diego

16 May 1932 Gira Nord d,Africa	Selecció de futbol d'Algèria	1 - 5	FC Barcelona	Alger
			Gual; Miro; Roig

20 May 1932 Gira Nord d,Africa	Entente sportive de Collo	0 - 3	FC Barcelona	Orà

22 May 1932 Gira Nord d,Africa	Sète	1 - 0	FC Barcelona	Oran

26 May 1932	FC Barcelona	4 - 1	Atlètic de Sabadell	Barcelona
	Ramon; Orriols			Stadium: Les Corts; Referee: ?

29 May 1932 Gira Nord d,Africa	FC Sochaux	4 - 2	FC Barcelona

31 May 1932 Gira Nord d,Africa	Idéal Sportive de Mostaganem	0 - 6	FC Barcelona	Mostagane

19 June 1932	FC Barcelona	6 - 3	CF Badalona	Barcelona
	Parera 2'; Artigas 13' 30'; Gual 39' 49'; Miro 86'			Stadium: Les Corts; Referee: Boada

24 June 1932	FC Barcelona	3 - 1	Selecció de futbol del País Basc	Barcelona
	Gual 18' 80'; Parera 55'			Stadium: Les Corts; Referee: Castarlenas

25 June 1932	FC Barcelona	2 - 1	Selecció de futbol del País Basc	Barcelona
	Bestit; Parera			Stadium: Les Corts; Referee: Arribas

29 June 1932	FC Barcelona	3 - 1	Torino	Barcelona
	Bestit 53' 89'; Arnau 70'			Stadium: Les Corts; Referee: Comorera

3 July 1932	FC Barcelona	2 - 2	Real Madrid	Barcelona
	Samitier			Stadium: Les Corts; Referee: Sojo

20 July 1932	FC Palafrugell	2 - 4	FC Barcelona	Barcelona
				Stadium: Palafrugell

21 July 1932	FC Palafrugell	2 - 1	FC Barcelona	Barcelona
			Bestit	Stadium: Palafrugell; Referee: Coll

24 July 1932	UE Lleida	1 - 6	FC Barcelona	Barcelona
			Castillo; Ramon; Dos Santos; Cladera; Orts	Stadium: Lleida; Referee: Vives

25 July 1932	UE Tàrrega	3 - 1	FC Barcelona
