= 1930–31 FC Barcelona season =

32nd season in existence of FC Barcelona

Barcelona
1930–31 season
- President: Gaspar Rosés
- Manager: Jim Bellamy
- Stadium: Les Corts
- La Liga: 4th
- Catalan League: Winners
- Copa del Rey: Round of 16
- Top goalscorer: League: Ángel Arocha (16); All: Ángel Arocha (24)

The 1930–31 season is FC Barcelona's 32nd in existence, and was their third year in the Primera División. It covers the period from 1930-08-01 to 1931-07-31.

FC Barcelona won the Catalan league for the 17th time, the 2nd in a row, their only title in the season.

== First-team squad ==
Note: Flags indicate national team as defined under FIFA eligibility rules; some limited exceptions apply. Players may hold more than one non-FIFA nationality.

No.	Pos.	Nation	Player
—	GK	(Spain) ESP	Ramón Llorens
—	GK	(Spain) ESP	Juan Uriach
—	GK	(Spain) ESP	Juan José Nogués
—	DF	(Spain) ESP	Esteban Pedrol
—	DF	(Spain) ESP	Ramón Zabalo
—	DF	(Spain) ESP	Patricio Arnau
—	DF	(Spain) ESP	Cristóbal Martí
—	DF	(Spain) ESP	Enrique Mas
—	DF	(Spain) ESP	Joaquín Roig
—	DF	(Germany) GER	Emil Walter
—	DF	(Spain) ESP	Manuel Oro
—	DF	(Spain) ESP	Conrad Portas
—	DF	(Spain) ESP	José Saló
—	MF	(Spain) ESP	Fernando Diego

No.	Pos.	Nation	Player
—	MF	(Spain) ESP	José Sastre
—	MF	(Spain) ESP	Juan Font
—	MF	(Spain) ESP	Severiano Goiburu
—	MF	(Spain) ESP	Ramón Guzmán
—	MF	(Spain) ESP	Vicente Piera
—	MF	(Spain) ESP	José Carlos Castillo
—	MF	(Spain) ESP	Carlos Bestit
—	FW	(Spain) ESP	Josep Samitier
—	FW	(Spain) ESP	Manuel Parera
—	FW	(Spain) ESP	Juan Ramón
—	FW	(Spain) ESP	Ángel Arocha
—	FW	(Spain) ESP	Emilio Sagi Liñán
—	FW	(Spain) ESP	Manuel García

== Transfers ==
=== In ===
Note: Flags indicate national team as defined under FIFA eligibility rules; some limited exceptions apply. Players may hold more than one non-FIFA nationality.

No.	Pos.	Nation	Player
—	GK	(Spain) ESP	Juan José Nogués
—	FW	(Spain) ESP	Emilio Sagi Liñán
—	DF	(Spain) ESP	Joaquín Roig
—	DF	(Spain) ESP	Manuel Oro
—	DF	(Spain) ESP	Conrad Portas (from Espanyol)
—	DF	(Spain) ESP	José Saló

=== Out ===
Note: Flags indicate national team as defined under FIFA eligibility rules; some limited exceptions apply. Players may hold more than one non-FIFA nationality.

No.	Pos.	Nation	Player
—	GK	(Hungary) HUN	Ferenc Plattkó
—	DF	(Spain) ESP	Vicente Saura
—	FW	(Spain) ESP	Antonio García
—	MF	(Spain) ESP	Domingo Carulla
—	GK	(Spain) ESP	Cristóbal Solà (to Racing de Santander)

== Competitions ==
=== La Liga ===
==== League table ====
Pos	Team	Pld	W	D	L	GF	GA	GD	Pts
2	Racing Santander	18	10	2	6	49	37	+12	22 (Note: Athletic Bilbao finished ahead of Racing Santander and Real Sociedad on head-to-head goal difference: Athletic Bilbao +7, Racing Santander –3, Real Sociedad –4)
3	Real Sociedad	18	10	2	6	42	39	+3	22
4	Barcelona	18	7	7	4	40	43	−3	21
5	Arenas	18	8	2	8	35	38	−3	18 (Note: Arenas finished ahead of Real Madrid on head-to-head points: Arenas–Real Madrid 4–1, Real Madrid–Arenas 1–2.)
6	Real Madrid	18	7	4	7	24	32	−8	18

Source: BDFútbol
Rules for classification: 1) points; 2) head-to-head points; 3) head-to-head goal difference; 4) goal difference; 5) number of goals scored.

==== Results by round ====
Round	1	2	3	4	5	6	7	8	9	10	11	12	13	14	15	16	17	18
Ground	H	A	A	H	A	H	A	H	A	A	H	H	A	H	A	H	A	H
Result	W	D	L	D	L	W	D	D	D	L	L	W	W	W	D	W	D	W
Position	1	1	3	7	10	6	4	4	5	8	8	8	6	4	5	4	4	4

Source: Competitive matches
A = Away; H = Home; W = Win; D = Draw; L = Loss

==== Matches ====
7 December 1930 1	Barcelona	6–3	Athletic Bilbao	Barcelona
	Diego 10', 57', 58'; Arocha 17', 46'; Bestit 28'	Report	Iraragorri 15', 52'; Gorostiza 89'	Stadium: Les Corts; Referee: Escartín Morán

14 December 1930 2	Europa	2–2	Barcelona	Barcelona
	Calvet 38'; Obiols 51'	Report	Bestit 9'; Arocha 43'	Stadium: El Ginardó; Referee: Coll

21 December 1930 3	Real Sociedad	4–1	Barcelona	San Sebastián
	Cholín 10'; Bienzobas 16', 37'; Mariscal 31'	Report	Arocha 28'	Stadium: Atotxa; Referee: Balaguer García

28 December 1930 4	Barcelona	1–1	Racing de Santander	Barcelona
	Diego 67'	Report	Cisco 14'	Stadium: Les Corts; Referee: Escartín Morán

4 January 1931 5	Arenas	5–0	Barcelona	Getxo
	Yermo 19', 24'; Calero 23'; Emilín 53', 63'	Report		Stadium: Ibaiondo; Referee: Escartín Morán

11 January 1931 6	Barcelona	6–2	Espanyol	Barcelona
	Arocha 10', 20', 69'; Bestit 16', 25'; Roig 81'	Report	Edelmiro 14', 48'	Stadium: Les Corts; Referee: Ledesma

18 January 1931 7	Real Unión	1–1	Barcelona	Irun
	Sagarzazu 26'	Report	Arocha 40'	Stadium: Gal; Referee: Hernández Areces

25 January 1931 8	Barcelona	1–1	Alavés	Barcelona
	Arnau 17'	Report	Quincoces II 41'	Stadium: Les Corts; Referee: Melcón Bartolomé

1 February 1931 9	Real Madrid	0–0	Barcelona	Madrid
		Report		Stadium: Chamartín; Referee: Insausti

8 February 1931 10	Athletic Bilbao	12–1	Barcelona	Bilbao
	Bata 2', 8', 24', 37', 57', 60', 68'; Gorostiza 27'; Lafuente 36'; Garizurieta 55'; Sastre 71' (o.g.); Iraragorri 83'	Report	Goiburu 10'	Stadium: San Mámés; Referee: Balaguer García

15 February 1931 11	Barcelona	0–2	Europa	Barcelona
		Report	Bestit II 3', 33'	Stadium: Les Corts; Referee: Arribas Seijas

22 February 1931 12	Barcelona	5–1	Real Sociedad	Barcelona
	Arocha 16', 23', 40'; Sastre 34'; Piera 89'	Report	Cholín 37'	Stadium: Les Corts; Referee: Balaguer García

1 March 1931 13	Racing de Santander	0–1	Barcelona	Santander
		Report	Sagi 44'	Stadium: El Sardinero; Referee: Melcón Bartolomé

8 March 1931 14	Barcelona	2–0	Arenas	Barcelona
	Goiburu 18'; Arocha 47'	Report		Stadium: Les Corts; Referee: Ostalé Gómez

17 March 1931 15	Espanyol	4–4	Barcelona	Barcelona
	Edelmiro 13'; Bonal 21'; Solé 26' (pen.); Besolí 81'	Report	Sastre 7'; Arocha 16', 44', 66' (pen.)	Stadium: Sarrià; Referee: Balaguer García

22 March 1931 16	Barcelona	5–3	Real Unión	Barcelona
	Sastre 14'; Bestit 21', 62', 77'; Arocha 38'	Report	Elícegui 47'; Regueiro 54'; Urtizberea 87'	Stadium: Les Corts; Referee: Ostalé Gómez

29 March 1931 17	Alavés	1–1	Barcelona	Vitoria-Gasteiz
	Albéniz 22'	Report	Goiburu 74'	Stadium: Mendizorrotza; Referee: Insausti

30 March 1930 18	Barcelona	3–1	Real Madrid	Barcelona
	Ramón 12', 35', 73'	Report	Eugenio 38'	Stadium: Les Corts; Referee: Vallana Jeanguenat

=== Copa del Rey ===
==== Round of 32 ====
12 April 1931 First leg	Barcelona	9–0	Don Benito	Barcelona
	Goiburu; Arocha; Sagi; Samitier; Castillo			Stadium: Les Corts

3 May 1931 Second leg	Don Benito	1–3	Barcelona	Don Benito
			Goiburu; Samitier	Stadium: Vicente Sanz

==== Round of 16 ====
10 May 1931 First leg	Valencia	2–2	Barcelona	Valencia
			Ramón; Goiburu	Stadium: Mestalla

17 May 1931 Second leg	Barcelona	1–2	Valencia	Barcelona
	Ramón			Stadium: Les Corts

=== Catalan football championship ===
==== League table ====
Pos	Team	Pld	W	D	L	GF	GA	GD	Pts
1	Barcelona	10	8	1	1	34	10	+24	17
2	Sabadell	10	5	2	3	18	15	+3	12
3	Badalona	10	5	1	4	19	14	+5	11

==== Matches ====
21 September 1930 1	Barcelona	2–1	Sabadell	Barcelona
	Samitier; Pedrol			Stadium: Les Corts

28 September 1930 2	Júpiter	1–9	Barcelona	Barcelona
			Bestit; Goiburu; Arocha; Sagi	Stadium: La Vernenda

5 October 1930 3	Europa	1–4	Barcelona	Barcelona
			Goiburu; Samitier; Arocha

12 October 1930 4	Barcelona	5–1	Badalona	Barcelona
	Goiburu; Arocha; Arnau; Sagi			Stadium: Les Corts

19 October 1930 5	Espanyol	2–3	Barcelona	Barcelona
			Goiburu; Piera; Solé (o.g.)	Stadium: Sarrià

26 October 1930 6	Sabadell	1–1	Barcelona	Sabadell
			Arocha	Stadium: Creu Alta

2 November 1930 7	Barcelona	4–2	Júpiter	Barcelona
	Arnau; Arocha; Diego; Samitier			Stadium: Les Corts

9 November 1930 8	Barcelona	1–0	Europa	Barcelona
	Goiburu			Stadium: Les Corts

16 November 1930 9	Badalona	1–0	Barcelona	Badalona

23 November 1930 10	Barcelona	5–0	Espanyol	Barcelona
	Samitier; Goiburu; Sagi; Arnau			Stadium: Les Corts

== Friendlies ==
Friendlies
Kick Off	Opponents	H / A	Result	Scorers
September 7, 1930	(Belgium) Bruxelles	H	5–0	Samitier (4), Sagi-Barba
September 8, 1930	(Belgium) Bruxelles	H	10–1	Ramón (4), Goiburu (2), Guzmán, Pedrol, Arocha, Castillo
September 15, 1930	(Spain) Valencia	H	5–2	Costa (o.g.), Arocha (3), Bestit
November 1, 1930	(Portugal) Benfica	H	5–1	Pedrol (2), Sastre, Diego, Arocha
November 30, 1930	(Spain) Athletic Bilbao	A	3–3	Bestit, Ramón, Arocha
December 8, 1930	(Spain) Sabadell	H	3–2	Sastre (2), M. García
December 25, 1930	Austria Wien	H	6–3	Samiter (2), Sastre (2), Parera, Arnau
December 26, 1930	Austria Wien	H	4–2	Samiter (2), Arocha, Pedrol
January 1, 1931	(Spain) Logroño	H	3–1	García (2), Buj
January 6, 1931	(Argentina) Gimnasia y Esgrima	H	1–2	Arocha
March 19, 1931	(France) Sète	H	2–0	Ramón (2)
March 25, 1931	(Argentina) Gimnasia y Esgrima	H	3–0	Goiburu (2), Ramón
April 6, 1931	(Spain) Europa	A	1–5	Arocha (2), Diego, Samitier, Goiburu
April 19, 1931	(Spain) Badalona	H	3–1	Goiburu (2), Ramón
May 24, 1931	(Spain) Atlético Madrid	H	3–3	Samitier, Ramón, Piera
May 25, 1931	(Spain) Atlético Madrid	H	5–3	Guzmán (3), Goiburu, Arocha
May 31, 1931	(Spain) Valladolid	H	10–0	Arocha (5), Ramón (3), Goiburu (2)
May 31, 1931	(Spain) Terrassa	H	9–1	Roig (3), Cambra (2), Sastre (2), Vilaseca, Arnau
June 14, 1931	(Spain) Castellón	H	4–1	Sastre, Samitier, Castillo, Piera
June 14, 1931	(Spain) Granollers	H	3–2	Arocha (2), Campa
June 21, 1931	(Spain) Zaragoza	H	4–0	Goiburu (2), Sastre, Samitier
June 24, 1931	(Spain) Racing de Santander	H	3–4	Samitier (2), Sastre
June 28, 1931	(Brazil) Vasco da Gama	H	3–2	Samitier, Goiburu, Piera
June 29, 1931	(Brazil) Vasco da Gama	H	1–2	Samitier
July 7, 1931	(Spain) Castellón	A	2–4	Arocha (2), Goiburu, Ramón
July 12, 1931	(Spain) Badalona	H	1–0	Goiburu

== Results ==
Friendly

7 September 1930	FC Barcelona	5–0	Entente Brusel-les	Barcelona
	Samitier 4' 43' 59' 89'; Sagi 75'			Stadium: Camp de les Corts; Referee: Vilalta

8 September 1930	FC Barcelona	10–1	Entente Brusel-les	Barcelona
	Ramon; Goiburu; Guzman; Pedrol; Arocha; Castillo			Stadium: Camp de les Corts; Referee: Arribas

8 September 1930	FC Gràcia	1–2	FC Barcelona	Barcelona
			A.Garcia; M.Garcia	Stadium: Gracia; Referee: Palomera

14 September 1930	FC Barcelona	5–2	València CF	Barcelona
	Costa equip contrari Arocha; Bestit			Stadium: Camp de les Corts; Referee: Llovera

1 November 1930	FC Barcelona	5–1	Benfica	Barcelona
	Pedrol 4' 67'; Sastre 5'; Diego 74'; Arocha 79'			Stadium: Camp de les Corts; Referee: Boada

30 November 1930	Athletic Club	3–3	FC Barcelona	Bilbao
			Parera 6' 74'; Arocha 65'	Stadium: San Mamés; Referee: Saracho

8 December 1930	FC Barcelona	3–2	CE Sabadell FC	Barcelona
	Sastre 18' 80'; M.Garcia 35'			Stadium: Camp de les Corts; Referee: Sojo

25 December 1930	FC Barcelona	6–3	Austria Wien	Barcelona
	Parera 4'; Samitier 12' 60'; Arnau 13'; Sastre 30' 85'			Stadium: Camp de les Corts; Referee: Comorera

26 December 1930	FC Barcelona	4–2	Austria Wien	Barcelona
	Samitier 43' 63'; Arocha 58'; Pedrol 72'			Stadium: Camp de les Corts; Referee: Peris

1 January 1931	FC Barcelona	3–1	Logronyo	Barcelona
	A.Garcia 20' 22'; Buj 51'			Stadium: Camp de les Corts; Referee: Comorera

6 January 1931	FC Barcelona	1–2	Gimnasia y Esgrima	Barcelona
	Arocha 55'			Stadium: Camp de les Corts; Referee: Comorera

19 March 1931	FC Barcelona	2–0	Sète	Barcelona
	Ramon 50' 67'			Stadium: Camp de les Corts; Referee: Comorera

25 March 1931	FC Barcelona	3–0	Gimnasia y Esgrima	Barcelona
	Ramon 10'; Goiburu 30' 65'			Stadium: Camp de les Corts; Referee: Comorera

6 April 1931	CE Europa	1–5	FC Barcelona	Barcelona
			Arocha; Samitier; Diego; Goiburu	Stadium: Gracia; Referee: Arribas

19 April 1931	FC Barcelona	3–1	CF Badalona	Barcelona
	Goiburu 35' 80'; Ramon 65'			Stadium: Camp de les Corts; Referee: Comorera

3 May 1931	UE Figueres	4–3	FC Barcelona	Barcelona
			Sastre; Arnau	Stadium: Figueres; Referee: Rovira

4 May 1931	UE Figueres	0–13	FC Barcelona	Barcelona
			Cambra; Sastre; Bestit; Roig	Stadium: Figueres; Referee: Pujol

14 May 1931	FC Barcelona	5–1	Sevilla FC	Barcelona
	Arocha 22' 29' 50' 84'; Roig 62'			Stadium: Camp de les Corts; Referee: Comorera

24 May 1931	FC Barcelona	3–3	Atlético de Madrid	Barcelona
	Samitier; Ramon; Piera			Stadium: Camp de les Corts; Referee: Comorera

25 May 1931	FC Barcelona	5–3	Atlético de Madrid	Barcelona
	Guzman; Goiburu; Arocha			Stadium: Camp de les Corts; Referee: Comorera

31 May 1931	FC Barcelona	10–0	Real Valladolid	Barcelona
	Ramon; Goiburu; Arocha			Stadium: Camp de les Corts; Referee: Boada

31 May 1931 Copa Macia	FC Barcelona	9–1	Terrassa FC	Barcelona
	Roig; Cambra; Sastre; Vilaseca; Arnau			Stadium: Camp de les Corts; Referee: Sojo

7 June 1931 Copa Macia	Terrassa FC	2–3	FC Barcelona	Barcelona
			Bestit; Sastre	Stadium: Terrassa; Referee: Ouchy

14 June 1931	FC Barcelona	4–1	CD Castelló	Barcelona
	Sastre; Samitier; Castillo; Piera			Stadium: Camp de les Corts; Referee: Comorera

14 June 1931 Copa Macia	FC Barcelona	3–2	EC Granollers	Barcelona
	Arocha; Cambra			Stadium: Camp de les Corts; Referee: Vilalta

21 June 1931	FC Barcelona	4–0	Real Zaragoza	Barcelona
	Goiburu; Sastre; Samitier			Stadium: Camp de les Corts; Referee: Llovera

21 June 1931 Copa Macia	EC Granollers	1–1	FC Barcelona	Barcelona
			Ramon	Stadium: Granollers; Referee: Santiago

24 June 1931	FC Barcelona	3–4	Racing de Santander	Barcelona
	Samitier; Sastre			Stadium: Camp de les Corts; Referee: Espelta

28 June 1931	FC Barcelona	3–2	Vasco da Gama	Barcelona
	Samitier 10'; Goiburu 37'; Goiburu 90'			Stadium: Camp de les Corts; Referee: Llovera

29 June 1931	FC Barcelona	1–2	Vasco da Gama	Barcelona
	Samitier			Stadium: Camp de les Corts; Referee: Comorera

7 July 1931	CD Castelló	2–4	FC Barcelona	Barcelona
			Arocha; Goiburu; Ramon	Stadium: Castelló; Referee: Cosin

12 July 1931 Copa Macia Final	FC Barcelona	1–0	CF Badalona	Barcelona
	Goiburu			Stadium: Camp de les Corts; Referee: Arribas

20 July 1931	FC Palafrugell	2–2	FC Barcelona	Barcelona
				Stadium: Palafrugell; Referee: Comorera

21 July 1931	FC Palafrugell	3–3	FC Barcelona	Barcelona
				Stadium: Palafrugell; Referee: Vilalta
