= Mataró FC =

Football club in Spain active between 1911 and 1915

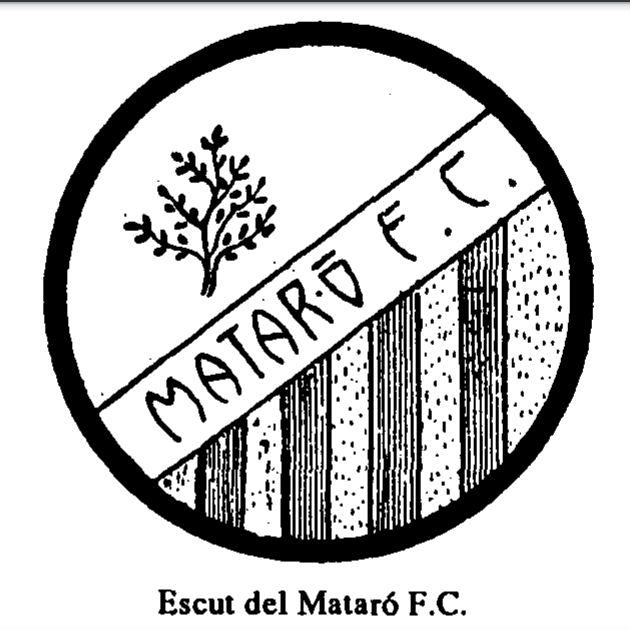
- The club's shield
- Founded: April 1911
- Dissolved: 1915
- Ground: Campo de Fomento
- League: Catalan championship
Home colours	Away colours

The Mataró FC was a Spanish football team located in Mataró, Spain, that existed between 1911 and 1915, being the first federated team in the city.

== History ==
=== Origins ===
The first references to football in Mataró can be found in 1901, when members of the Sociedad Colombófila Mensajera Iluro, headquartered in the Sport Mataronés building, began to organize matches between its members in the local velodrome. Football continued to grow and be practiced both in streets and squares as well as in the Colegio de los Hermanos Escolapios de Santa Ana, with the first serious club emerging in early 1911, Cataluña Sport Club or FC Catalunya de Mataró, being officially established in April 1911 with Salvador Garriga as its first president.

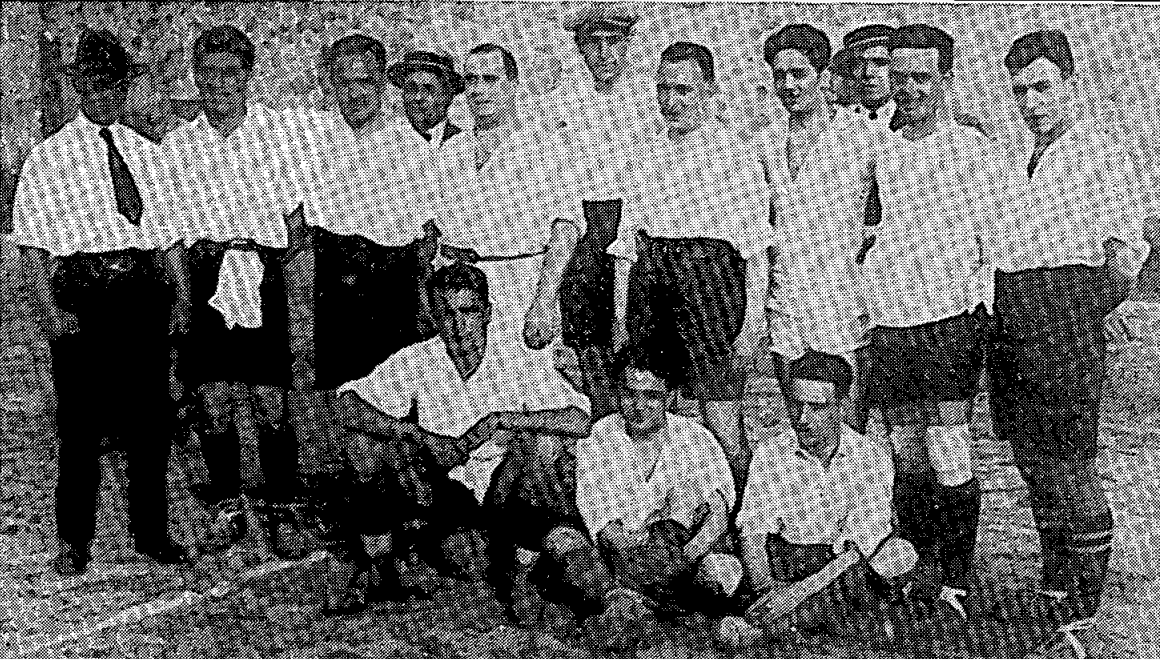
Mataró FC in 1911.

In that same month, a group of young people who played in the municipal park, mostly members of Esport Mataronés, inspired by the creation of Cataluña SC, decided to found the Mataró Football Club, with a board chaired by Joaquim Soler, but he was soon replaced by Josep Soler Moreu. Some sources state that Mataró FC was founded as a section of Foment Mataroní, a non-profit organization founded in Mataró in 1904. A few weeks later, on 14 May, the club played its first-ever match against Cataluña at the old Velódromo de Mataró, which ended in a 3–3; both teams were formed with only seven players per side, with Mataró fielding Soler, Josep Ximenes, Víctor Vives, J. Cuadrada, J. Mirats, Bartra, and Josep Maria Bertran). Therefore, as time went by, both clubs decided to merge to increase their social and sporting mass, doing so in December, continuing under the name Mataró FC and registering a few days later in the Catalan Football Federation, who placed them in the Second Category, thus becoming the first federated club in the city. The club initially wore red and white t-shirt.

=== Golden years ===
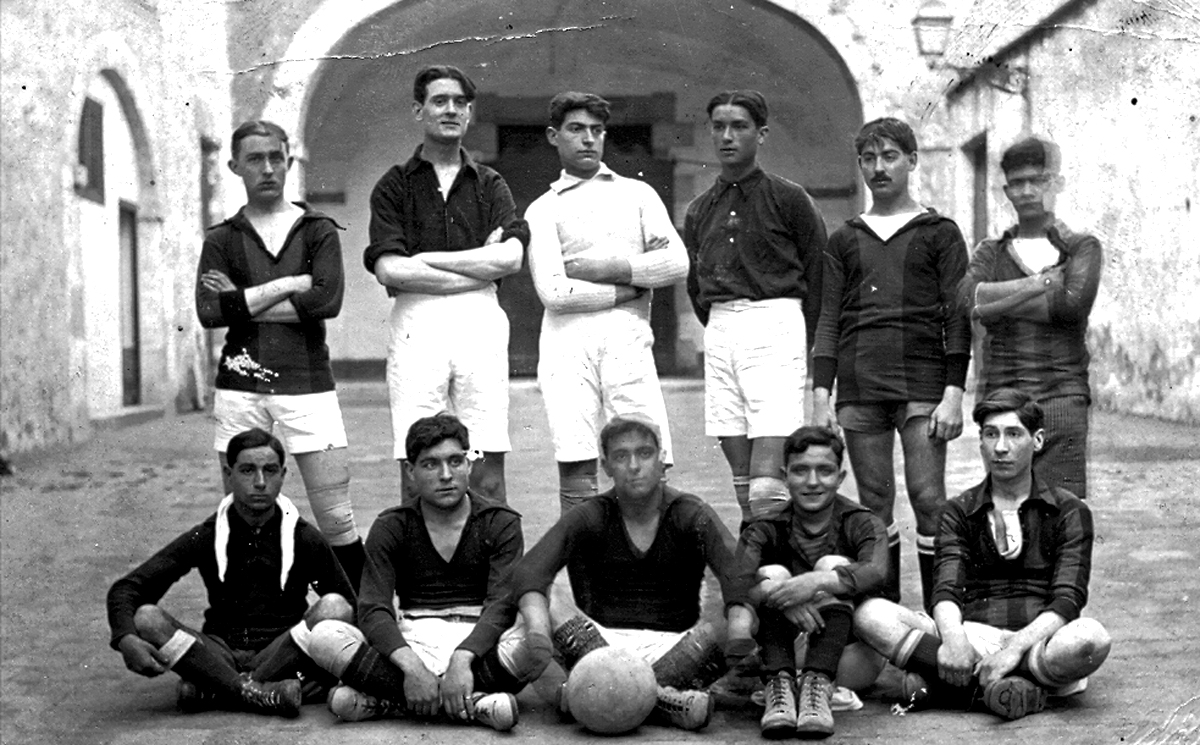
Mataró FC in 1912.

In order to accommodate the increasing number of fans, Mataró built a football field, the so-called Campo de Fomento, located in the current Ronda d'Alfons X, which was inaugurated on 1 January 1912. On its inauguration day, the field hosted the so-called Copa Mataró organized by Mataró FC, having renowned guests, such as FC Barcelona and Català FC, both from Catalonia, and according to the local press, the Blaugranas demonstrated "in every game a lot of superiority over the opposing club", beating Mataró 7–0. A few months later, on 30 June, Mataró played a friendly match against RCD Espanyol at the Campo del Fomento, and it surprisingly won 3–2, with the chronicles of that match stating that it was "one of the most beautiful played in Mataró", and highlighting the defense made-up of Ximenes and Cuadrada, which "played extraordinarily".

In the 1911–12 Catalan championship, Mataró FC finished in 18th position out of 21 participants, winning only two matches, against the fourth team of Espanyol (3–2) and Mercantil de Barcelona (4–2). In the summer of 1912, Mataró, now wearing red and black with black pants and chaired by Josep Soler Moreu, recruited two players from Barça's second team, Mariano Bori and Antonio Fàbregas, which allowed them to defeat the "invincible" Valldemia FC 4–1.

In late 1912, however, a conflict between members and internal differences caused some of them to leave the club to create a new one, Iluro Sport Club. In February 1913, the second team of Mataró faced the second team of the newly founded Iluro SC in a match held at Fomento and refereed by Cuadrada, but the result is unknown. Mataró soon developed a rivalry with Iluro, but they avoided playing each other, facing good opponents from Barcelona instead, with Mataró even beating Catalunya de Barcelona 4–1. In early 1914, a fan began to promote the idea of holding a charity match between the two main clubs in the city, which took place on 5 April, with Mataró discarding its seniority rights by allowing Iluro to choose the referee in order to improve harmony and even asked that "there be no winners or losers"; Mataró won 3–0. In November 1914, Mataró and Iluro joined forces to organize the first official championship in the city called Campionat de 2a. Lliga i de la Costa, which also included Bètulo FC from Badalona, and Esbart FC from Vilassar de Dalt; Iluro was by far the strongest team, but all of its points were deducted for having lined up the goalkeeper Salvi Mateo under the pseudonym Casanovas, so Mataró was crowned champion. During this tournament, Mataró fielded a team completely made up of locals: Tarragó, Mirats, Cantats, Soler, Reyes, Casanovas, Sabater, Cuadrada, Garriga, Gómez, and Pibernat.

=== Decline and collapse ===
Iluro SC kept gaining supporters and followers, matching Mataró in quality by mid-1914, a power struggle that continued until the summer of 1915, when Mataró FC, poorly managed and with continuous changes of directors, ended up being dissolved and disappeared. In 1922, some ex-players of Mataró FC founded Club Deportivo Mataró in an attempt to revitalize this defunct club.

== Honours ==
Coastal Championship

- Champions (1): 1914
