= Bestit =

Bestit is a Spanish surname. Notable people with the surname include:

- Carles Bestit (1908–1972), Spanish footballer
  - Carles Bestit (doctor) (1936–1993), Spanish doctor and son of the above
- Luis Bestit (born 1945), Spanish water polo player
- Tomás Bestit (1910–1995), Spanish footballer
