= Carles Bestit =

Carles Bestit may refer to:

- Carles Bestit (footballer) (1908–1972), Spanish footballer
- Carles Bestit (doctor) (1936–1993), Spanish doctor
