= Catalan Football Championship of Second Category =

- Founded: 1906
- Folded: 1940
- Country: Spain
- Last champions: Sant Andreu
- Most championships: CE Júpiter; UE Sants; FC Martinenc (3 titles)

The Catalan football championship of Second Category was the second division of the Catalan football championship, which gave access to compete in the top category.

== History ==
Both its name and its competition format varied over the years. Thus, in the early years, the second-tier clubs contested in the Junior Championship, and the top-tier played in the Senior Championship. In the 1912–13 season, this category was called the Second League. The following season, the category was called the Second Category.

In the 1917–18 season, the category was renamed as Campionat de Catalunya B (or Primera B), and was contested by 6 clubs in a league format, with the champions playing a promotion match against the last-qualified team in Primera A, in order to achieve promotion. In 1928, however, it was renamed the "Second Category Preferent" and was contested by 12 clubs divided into three groups of four, with the five best teams in the second division competing against the three worst teams in the first division in a promotion play-off. This system remained more or less stable until the 1934–35 season, when it reverted to the name of Primera B, contested by 18 teams in 3 groups. It disappeared in 1940.

== Winners ==
Season	Denomination	Champion
1906–1907 (Details)	Junior Championship	FC Espanya
1907–1908 (Details)	Junior Championship	Salut SC
1908–1909 (Details)	Junior Championship	FC Central
1909–1910 (Details)	Junior Championship	FC Numància
1910–1911 (Details)	Junior Championship	FC Numància
1911–1912 (Details)	Junior Championship	FC Internacional
1912–1913 (Details)	Second League	FC Internacional (FCCF); F.C. T.B.H. (FAC)
1913–1914 (Details)	Second Category	Sabadell FC
1914–1915 (Details)	Second Category	Atlético de Sabadell
1915–1916 (Details)	Second Category	Terrassa
1916–1917 (Details)	Second Category	Alfonso XIII de Palma
1917–1918 (Details)	First Category B	CS de Sants (Nota)
1918–1919 (Details)	First Category B	CE Europa
1919–1920 (Details)	First Category B	L'Avenç del Sport
1920–1921 (Details)	First Category B	L'Avenç del Sport
1921–1922 (Details)	First Category B	FC Espanya
1922–1923 (Details)	First Category B	Martinenc
1923–1924 (Details)	First Category B	Terrassa
1924–1925 (Details)	First Category B	Júpiter
1925–1926 (Details)	First Category B	Badalona
1926–1927 (Details)	First Category B	Gimnàstic de Tarragona
1927–1928 (Details)	First Category B	Júpiter
1928–1929 (Details)	Second Category Preferent	Júpiter
1929–1930 (Details)	Second Category Preferent	Sabadell FC
1930–1931 (Details)	Second Category Preferent	Martinenc
1931–1932 (Details)	Second Category Preferent	Sants
1932–1933 (Details)	Second Category Preferent	Granollers
1933–1934 (Details)	Second Category Preferent	Sants
1934–1935 (Details)	First Category B	Granollers
1935–1936 (Details)	First Category B	Granollers
1936–1937 (Details)	First Category B	Martinenc
1937–1938 (Details)	First Category B	Sants
1938–1939	-	There was no dispute
1939–1940 (Details)	First Category B	Sant Andreu

== See also ==
- Catalan football championship
