= 1937–38 Catalan Football League =

Tournament details
- Country: Catalonia
- Dates: 27 March – 28 August 1938
- Teams: 10

Final positions
- Champions: Barcelona (1st title)
- Runners-up: Sants

Tournament statistics
- Top goal scorer: Francisco Mateo (38 goals)

The 1937–38 Catalan Football League (Catalan: Lliga Catalana) was the regional football league played in Catalonia during the 1937–38 season, in the midst of the Spanish Civil War, when neither La Liga, the Catalan championship, or the Mediterranean League was contested. The competition was never completed because of the War, but the title was subsequently awarded to FC Barcelona, which had returned from its tour of Mexico and the United States with only four players and the coach Patrick O'Connell.

== Background ==
The Spanish Civil War, which broke out in July 1936, had divided Spain into areas under the control of the nationalists and those controlled by the Republicans, thus forcing the suspension of La Liga, so the Republican authorities decided to replace it with the Mediterranean League, which was won by Barcelona, but by 1938, the Republican area was divided, thus forcing the suspension of the Mediterranean League, so the Republican authorities decided to replace it with the Catalan Football League, which was also won by Barcelona.

== Participants ==
Following a preliminary phase, 10 clubs were classified for the tournament, including five from the Catalan top-flight (Barça, Júpiter, Badalona, Europa, Espanyol), four from the second (Sants, Manresa, Avenç, Martinenc), and Iluro SC from the third category. However, Manresa withdrew after playing only two matches, for financial reasons.

== Classification ==
Pos	Team	Pld	W	D	L	GF	GA	GD	Pts	Qualification
1	FC Barcelona (C)	17	14	1	2	85	26	+59	27	Champion (-2)
2	UE Sants	16	10	3	3	66	37	+29	23	
3	CE Europa	16	7	3	6	46	39	+7	17	
4	FC Martinenc	16	7	3	6	39	44	−5	17	
5	RCD Espanyol	16	6	4	6	45	44	+1	16	
6	Avenç	16	8	3	5	45	36	+9	14	(-5)
7	FC Badalona	15	4	1	10	32	50	−18	9	
8	CE Júpiter	17	4	2	11	28	76	−48	8	(-2)
9	Iluro SC	15	2	2	11	31	55	−24	6	
10	CE Manresa	2	0	0	2	4	14	−10	0	(Withdrew)

(C) Champions

== Results ==
This league was one of the most prolific in terms of goalscoring records, with a total of 421 goals scored in just 73 matches, which results in an average of almost 6 goals per match. Source:

First round
Matchday	Date	Local - Visitant	Result
1	27 March 1938	Barcelona – Manresa	10–1
1	27 March 1938	Espanyol – Badalona	3–0
1	27 March 1938	Iluro – Europa	3–4
1	27 March 1938	Sants – Martinenc	2–3
1	27 March 1938	Júpiter – Avenç	2–1
2	3 April 1938	Manresa – Júpiter	3–4
2	3 April 1938	Badalona – Barcelona	1–2
2	29 May 1938	Europa – Espanyol	4–0 (Note: The match was originally scheduled for 3 April, but was suspended due to the unavailability of Europa’s field, and was finally played on May 29.)
2	3 April 1938	Martinenc – Iluro	4–1
2	3 April 1938	Avenç – Sants	1–3
3	10 April 1938	Manresa – Badalona	Not played
3	10 April 1938	Barcelona – Europa	3–3
3	10 April 1938	Espanyol – Martinenc	4–3
3	10 April 1938	Iluro – Avenç	2–3
3	10 April 1938	Júpiter – Sants	0–2
4	17 April 1938	Badalona – Júpiter	7–3
4	17 April 1938	Europa – Manresa	Not played
4	17 April 1938	Martinenc – Barcelona	5–2
4	17 April 1938	Avenç – Espanyol	1–1
4	17 April 1938	Sants – Iluro	4–1
5	24 April 1938	Badalona – Europa	4–1
5	24 April 1938	Manresa – Martinenc	Not played
5	24 April 1938	Barcelona – Avenç	8–0
5	24 April 1938	Espanyol – Sants	3–3
5	24 April 1938	Júpiter – Iluro	2–1
6	1 May 1938	Europa – Júpiter	2–1
6	1 May 1938	Martinenc – Badalona	4–2
6	1 May 1938	Avenç – Manresa	Not played
6	1 May 1938	Sants – Barcelona	1–7
6	1 May 1938	Iluro – Espanyol	3–3
7	8 May 1938	Europa – Martinenc	1–0
7	8 May 1938	Badalona – Avenç	3–0
7	8 May 1938	Manresa – Sants	Not played
7	8 May 1938	Barcelona – Iluro	8–0
7	8 May 1938	Júpiter – Espanyol	2–1
8	15 May 1938	Júpiter – Martinenc	0–2
8	15 May 1938	Avenç – Europa	3–0
8	15 May 1938	Sants – Badalona	6–0
8	15 May 1938	Iluro – Manresa	Not played
8	15 May 1938	Espanyol – Barcelona	0–4
9	22 May 1938	Martinenc – Avenç	1–2
9	22 May 1938	Europa – Sants	5–8
9	22 May 1938	Badalona – Iluro	4–0
9	22 May 1938	Manresa – Espanyol	(Not played)
9	22 May 1938	Barcelona – Júpiter	8–0

Second round
Matchday	Date	Local - Visitant	Result
10	5 June 1938	Manresa – Barcelona	Not played
10	5 June 1938	Badalona – Espanyol	3–5
10	5 June 1938	Europa – Iluro	5–0
10	5 June 1938	Martinenc – Sants	2–8
10	5 June 1938	Avenç – Júpiter	9–3
11	12 June 1938	Júpiter – Manresa	Not played
11	12 June 1938	Barcelona – Badalona	4–1
11	12 June 1938	Espanyol – Europa	1–4
11	12 June 1938	Iluro – Martinenc	6–1
11	12 June 1938	Sants – Avenç	1–1
12	25 June 1938	Badalona – Manresa	Not played
12	31 July 1938	Europa – Barcelona	2–3 (Note: Barcelona did not play the match on 25 June because they were playing a friendly against the Carabinieri Corps in Sarrià Stadium on the same day for the benefit of the Catalan Volunteers.)
12	25 June 1938	Martinenc – Espanyol	2–2
12	25 June 1938	Avenç – Iluro	5–1
12	25 June 1938	Sants – Júpiter	11–2
13	3 July 1938	Júpiter – Badalona	1–1
13	3 July 1938	Manresa – Europa	Not played
13	3 July 1938	Barcelona – Martinenc	6–2
13	3 July 1938	Espanyol – Avenç	5–1
13	3 July 1938	Iluro – Sants	3–3
14	10 July 1938	Europa – Badalona	5–1
14	10 July 1938	Martinenc – Manresa	Not played
14	10 July 1938	Avenç – Barcelona	5–1
14	10 July 1938	Sants – Espanyol	5–1
14	10 July 1938	Iluro – Júpiter	7–0
15	17 July 1938	Júpiter – Europa	4–4
15	17 July 1938	Badalona – Martinenc	2–3
15	17 July 1938	Manresa – Avenç	Not played
15	17 July 1938	Barcelona – Sants	5–2
15	17 July 1938	Espanyol – Iluro	3–2
16	7 August 1938	Martinenc – Europa	2–2
16	7 August 1938	Avenç – Badalona	10–3
16	7 August 1938	Sants – Manresa	Not played
16	28 August 1938	Iluro – Barcelona	1–6 (Note: Barcelona did not play the match on 7 August because they were playing a friendly against the Security Forces that same day.)
16	28 August 1938	Espanyol – Júpiter	11–1 (Note: The match was initially scheduled for 7 August, but it was suspended.)
17	14 August 1938	Martinenc – Júpiter	4–3
17	14 August 1938	Europa – Avenç	1–2
17	14 August 1938	Badalona – Sants	0–3
17	14 August 1938	Manresa – Iluro	Not played
17	14 August 1938	Barcelona – Espanyol	6–2
18	28 August 1938	Avenç – Martinenc	1–1 (Note: The match was initially scheduled for 21 August, but was suspended due to rain.)
18	21 August 1938	Sants – Europa	4–3
18	4 September 1938	Iluro – Badalona	Not played (Note: The match was initially scheduled for 21 August, but was suspended due to rain, so it took place two weeks later on 4 September, but Badalona did not show up.)
18	21 August 1938	Espanyol – Manresa	Not played
18	21 August 1938	Júpiter – Barcelona	0–2

== Statistics ==
=== Top Scorers ===
Rank	Player	Team	Goals
1	Francisco Mateo	Barcelona	38
2	Gerardo Bilbao	Barcelona	25
3	Vicente Martínez	Espanyol	18
4	Folch	Sants	15
5	Rosemary	Europa	13
6	Climent Judici	Sants (10) and Espanyol (2)	12
5	Garcia	Sants	10
5	Satur Grech	Sants	9
6	Francisco Amorós	Badalona	9

== Bibliography ==
- Martialay, Félix (2016). El fútbol en la guerra (Tomo VIII): Federación Catalana [Football in the war (Volume VIII): Catalan Federation] (in Spanish). Madrid: CIHEFE. p. 667. ISBN 978-8494500985.
