= Josep Germà =

Spanish liquor industrialist, patron of culture and sport, and politician

- Born: Josep Germà i Homet; 15 October 1873; Castellar del Vallès, Catalonia, Spain
- Died: 17 August 1936 (aged 62)
- Citizenship: Spanish
- Occupations: Liquor industrialist; Politician

FC Atlético de Sabadell

President of the Catalan Football Federation
- In office 1918–1919
- Preceded by: Gaspar Rosés
- Succeeded by: Josep Rosich
- Known for: Mayor of Sabadell

Josep Germà Homet (15 October 1873 – 17 August 1936) was a Spanish liquor industrialist, patron of culture and sport, and a politician who served as the mayor of Sabadell following the events of 6 October 1934.

He was a president of both FC Atlético de Sabadell for many years and of the Catalan Football Federation between 1918 and 1919.

== Early life ==
Josep Germà was born on 15 October 1873 in Castellar del Vallès, Catalonia, as the son of Miquel and Antònia, who were from the working class. When he was 5 years old, he moved with his parents to Sabadell, where he did primary school at Escola Pia. At the age of 10, he started working as an apprentice cook, but his spell as such was short as he then went to work at the Capellades brothers' liquor factory, which was located at Carrer Sant Oleguer, no. 112. At the age of 17, he became a partner in the company and later acquired the part of the owners.

== Liquor industrialist ==
He then founded Destileria Germà in 1898, a company that produced more than 20 types of liqueurs and brandies for more than 80 years, including the Anis del Taup brand, which Germà created in 1902, and which become known not only in Spain, but also in Europe and America, especially in New York and Argentina, where he opened important markets. In addition to the Anis del Taup brand, Germà created numerous other liqueurs, producing up to twenty brands of spirits and brandies, including Estomacal Eva. He also participated in different exhibitions in Spain and abroad.

Germà took special care of the brand's advertising, design, and presentation of his products, even traveling to Paris to learn, study, and be inspired by the original design for the posters, cards, bottles, labels, and mirrors that were being made. he launched energetic advertising campaigns in buildings, cinemas, trams, bullrings, kiosks, and football fields with posters of great artistic quality.

In 1908, Germà obtained the gold medal in Zaragoza, and in 1920 the Cross of Merit and the gold medal in Milan.

== Patron of culture and sport ==
Germà was a restless and active character in Sabadell's life, especially in sports, being a great fan of them from a young age, particularly football. He presided over FC Atlético de Sabadell for many years and in 1916 he received a tribute from the managers, members, and players. Likewise, he also presided over the Sabadell Sports Center, as well as the Sabadell Aeroclub, which he co-founded, and the Vallès Aeroclub. He was a treasurer of the Catalan Football Federation and presided over it between 1918 and 1919.

Outside of football, Germà was the founder of the Penya Ciclista Palomillas (Palomillas Cycling Club), president of Boxa Sabadell, and a member of the Penya Automobilística Rin. He also helped young athletes without resources to have the opportunity to compete.

Germà also participated and collaborated financially in various social, cultural, and recreational entities and organizations, such as the road gangs at the San Antonio Abad parades (donkey day), in events such as the Floral Games or the Festa Major, where it became a tradition for the giants and tadpoles to stop at Cal Germà's skate park to have a drink. He promoted and gave financial support to several activities, such as children's summer camps, the Book Festival, or the Homenatge a la Vellesa (a day dedicated to the elderly).

== Mayor of Sabadell ==
Politically, Josep Germà was a member of the Fraternidad Republicana Radical, the local denomination of Alejandro Lerroux's party. According to Andreu Castells, "the Sabadell radicals were uncompromising and anti-clerical atheists".

Following the events of 6 October 1934, the democratically elected council of the Sabadell city chaired by federal republican Magí Marcé was dissolved by government order. Four days later, a management committee formed by seven members was created which only lasted two days because on 12 October, the military commander of the square, Francesc Llopis Llopis, appointed Josep Germà as the new mayor-manager of Sabadell; he held this position alone, without any councilor, until 3 May 1935, which according to Castells, was a "unique case in our civil history". On 26 April 1935, the civilian government appointed 24 councilors, of which seven radical republicans did not take possession of the position. Germà continued in the mayor's office until the elections of 16 February 1936, which gave victory to the Popular Front. He was, therefore, the mayor of Sabadell from October 1934 to February 1936, by force.

On the night of his hasty takeover, Germà appeared before the microphones of Ràdio Sabadell with a conciliatory message in which he appealed to continue "normal life and forget the grievances that may have been caused" following the events of 6 October. He ended his speech by stating that "the doors of my office are open to attend, whenever possible, to all the tribulations and all the worries that could occur to you"; this despite the character of his mayor's office being just a mere "administrative management", as he acknowledged.

Germà exercised the mayorship under the supervision of the military authority with limited powers as specified in the order signed by Llopis. According to Ricard Simó, during his time as mayor, "he dodged in a dignified manner all kinds of tendentious pressures, which were not few. Thanks to his ability and his successful interventions near the military authority, he was able to avoid and solve angry arbitrariness against certain citizens of marked political significance on the left." In fact, Magí Marcé, the legitimate republican mayor, gave him public recognition for his work in very difficult times.

== Political testament ==
On 15 February 1936, on the eve of the elections, in an atmosphere of marked political tension that preluded the Spanish Civil War, Germà gave a speech on Ràdio Sabadell that can be considered his political testament.

In it, he declared that he had arrived at the mayor's office "for reasons quite contrary to my will" and claimed the work he had carried out at first "alone, all alone" and then accompanied by some "colleagues", were made to try to "take care of all the conflicts that arose and solve all the needs that were exposed to me". Then he added: "I do not know whether I will always have succeeded in my undertaking, but I do know for certain that there is no one who can say that he has not found in me an affectionate and cordial welcome, and he has not found in me all the possible collaboration to attend to the requests that have been made to me". He ended his address with a vibrant: "For Sabadell, for Catalonia and for the Republic, make tomorrow's election day an exemplary day".

== Death ==
Germà was murdered on the road from Castellar del Vallès to Matadepera on 17 August 1936, when he was returning from Les Arenas, near Can Pagès. According to Castells, mayor Josep Moix warned his party colleagues to hide him, but Germà refused, claiming that he had not harmed anyone and that he had nothing to fear or hide. Moix then sent this warning message to his friend García Negrillo who apparently arrived too late.

Castells attributed his murder to the squad known as the butchers formed by Emili Torreguitart, Joan Parera, Marcelino Blanco, Antonio Camacho, and Saturnino Nicolás Antolino "Lino", who had been Moix's bodyguard and who is credited with a hundred of murders. This squad organized the so-called "ditch councils", where those suspected of collaboration with the insurgent Francoist military were executed on the roads around the city, such as composer and organist Àngel Rodamilans, shot in the Serra d'en Camaró on 27 July.

== Legacy ==
Many years after his death, the Josep Germà Humet Commission was formed, among others, by his granddaughter Empar Germà and his great-granddaughter, Elisabet Germà, with the aim of the city giving him public recognition. Finally, a square was dedicated to him in the Creu Alta neighborhood in an event presided over on 18 March 2011, by the mayor, Manuel Bustos, who described Germà "as an illustrious Sabadell who always worked for others, especially for the weakest, the smallest and the oldest, in a time of great political upheaval".

On the other hand, the liquor company continued to operate until the end of the 1970s. After a 30-year-old hiatus, one of Germà's great-grandsons Ramon Comadrán reopened the Destileria Germà in 2013. He then restarted production presenting two types of gins, one normal and one premium, with the latter being named the Dry-Gin GERMÀ Premium, which was created from an old recipe imported from London by Josep Germà himself. According to experts, this product was on par with the best classic gins, and in fact, the Dry-Gin GERMÀ Premium won the 2015 Gold Medal at the Brussels World Competition after competing with around 200 gins from around the world and being recognized by the jury as one of the best for its unique characteristics.
