= Alcoriza =

Alcoriza is a surname. Notable people with the surname include:

- David Alcoriza (born 1968), American sport shooter
- Francisco Alcoriza (1903–1991), Spanish footballer
- Janet Alcoriza (1918–1998), Austrian-born Mexican screenwriter and actress
- Luis Alcoriza (1918–1992), Mexican screenwriter, film director and actor
