= Juan Ramón (footballer, born 1909) =

Spanish footballer (1909–1968)

Personal information
- Full name: Juan Ramón Pera
- Birth name: Juan Ramon i Pera
- Date of birth: 22 February 1909
- Place of birth: Vilassar de Mar, Spain
- Date of death: 8 April 1968 (aged 59)
- Place of death: Barcelona, Spain
- Position: Forward

Youth career
- Vilassar de Mar

Senior career*
Years	Team	Apps	(Gls)
1923–1924	Vilassar de Mar		
1924–1926	FC Barcelona lower teams		
1926–1935	Barcelona	60	(30)
1935–1936	Girona		
1936–1937	Badalona		
1937	Espanyol		
1941–1942	Gavà		

International career
1931–1936	Catalonia	5	(1)

Managerial career
- Calella
- Lloret
- * Club domestic league appearances and goals

Juan Ramón Pera (22 February 1909 – 8 April 1968) was a Spanish footballer who played as a forward for Barcelona between 1927 and 1935, and for Espanyol in 1937.

== Club career ==
=== Early career ===
Born on 22 February 1909 in the Catalonian town of Vilassar de Mar, Juan Ramón began his football career in 1924, aged 15, at his hometown club UE Vilassar de Mar, which had just been founded (1923). The following year, in 1924, the 15-year-old Ramón joined the lower categories of FC Barcelona, where he stayed for two years, until the end of the 1925–26 season, when he began playing with the first team in some friendly matches.

=== FC Barcelona ===
Three years later, on 10 February 1929, Ramón went down in history as one of the eleven footballers who started for Barça in their first-ever La Liga match. Two years later, on 5 May 1931, he scored a league hat-trick against Real Madrid at Les Corts, thus becoming only the third Barça player to do so after Jaime Lazcano and Fernando Sañudo.

Ramón remained at Barça for over a decade, from 1924 until 1935, scoring a total of 225 goals in 314 matches, of which 80 came in 134 official matches, including 30 goals in 60 La Liga matches. He thus played a crucial role in the Barça team that won the inaugural edition of La Liga in 1929, the Copa del Rey in 1928 (although he did not play in the final), and five Catalan championship in (1928, 1930–32, and 1935).

=== Later career ===
After leaving Barça in 1935, Juan Ramón played one season at both Girona (1935–36) and Badalona (1936–37), before joining Espanyol in late 1937, with whom he only played five official matches, all in the Mediterranean League. When the Spanish Civil War ended in 1939, he played for Gavà and later became a coach at Calella and Lloret.

== International career ==
Like so many other Barça players, Juan Ramón was eligible to play for the Catalan national team, with whom he played five matches, making his debut at Les Corts on 4 June 1931, in a friendly against a Prague XI. In his next match on 6 April 1932, he scored a goal to help Catalonia to a 4–1 win over his future club Badalona. In the following year, on 27 August 1933, he started for Catalonia in a friendly against a Budapest XI, helping his side to a 3–1 win.

== Death ==
Juan Ramón died in Barcelona, Catalonia, on 8 April 1968, at the age of 59. His younger brother, Xevi Ramón, also played football for Barça, but only with its amateur team. His son went on to play for Barça's youth teams, while his grandson, Xevi Ramon, played for the senior team, but only in friendlies.

== Honours ==
FC Barcelona

- La Liga
  - Champions (1): 1929
- Catalan championship:
  - Champions (5): 1927–28, 1929–30, 1930–31, 1931–32, and 1934–35
- Copa del Rey:
  - Champions (1): 1928

== See also ==
- List of La Liga hat-tricks
