= Mariano Bori =

Spanish footballer

Personal information
- Full name: Mariano Pedro de Roma Bori Viaud
- Date of birth: 12 June 1893
- Place of birth: Buenos Aires, Argentina
- Date of death: 17 December 1940 (aged 47)
- Place of death: Buenos Aires, Argentina
- Position: Midfielder

Senior career*
Years	Team	Apps	(Gls)
1903–1904	X Sporting Club		
1906–1907	X Sporting Club		
1909	Barcelona		
1911–1912	Universitary SC		
1912–1914	Barcelona		
1912	→ Mataró FC (on loan)		
- * Club domestic league appearances and goals

Mariano Pedro de Roma Bori Viaud (18 January 1893 – 22 October 1966) was a Spanish footballer who played as a midfielder for FC Barcelona in the early 1910s, with whom he won the treble in the 1912–13 season (Catalan Championship, Copa del Rey, and the Pyrenees Cup).

== Playing career ==
Mariano Bori was born in Buenos Aires, Argentina, on 18 January, as the son of a Catalan father and a French mother. While studying medicine in Barcelona, he began playing football in the nearby club X Sporting Club, with whom he played for three years, between 1903 and 1906, during which time the local press erroneously called him Alfredo.

At the start of the 1909–10 season, he played one friendly match for FC Barcelona on 19 September, helping his side to a 2–0 win over FC Espanya. He then joined Universitary SC, but soon returned to FC Barcelona, where he played for two seasons between 1912 and 1914. In doing so, he became the first Argentine footballer to play for Barça, being soon followed by the likes of Emilio Sagi-Barba, Mateo Nicolau, Lionel Messi, and Sergio Agüero. At some point in late 1912, Barça temporarily lent two of its players, Bori and Antonio Fàbregas, to the newly established Mataró FC, which was thus able to defeat the "invincible" Valldemia FC 4–1.

In his first full season at Barça, he helped his team win all the titles at stake: The 1912–13 Catalan Championship, the 1913 Copa del Rey, and the 1913 Pyrenees Cup. In the domestic cup final, Barça needed three games to beat Real Sociedad, with Bori started in all of them, and in the Pyrenees Cup, he started in the semifinals against Espanyol on 6 April, but missed the final against the French club La Comète et Simiot. In total, he played 18 matches for the club, including 11 official ones.

Bori was also a prominent tennis player.

== Later life ==
Bori later worked as a dermatologist. He died on 22 October 1966, at the age of 73.

== Honours ==
FC Barcelona

- Catalan championship
  - Champions (1): 1912–13
- Pyrenees Cup:
  - Champions (1): 1913
- Copa del Rey:
  - Champions (1): 1913
