= 1937–38 Campionat de Catalunya =

Campionat de Catalunya
- Season: 1937–38
- Champions: Barcelona
- Matches: 56
- Goals: 234 (4.18 per match)
- Top goalscorer: Jaume Rigual (15 goals)
- Biggest home win: Barcelona 9–1 Espanyol (31 October 1937)
- Biggest away win: Granollers 0–6 Júpiter (24 October 1937)
- Highest scoring: Barcelona 9–1 Espanyol (31 October 1937)

The 1937–38 Campionat de Catalunya season was the 39th since its establishment and was played between 17 October 1937 and 16 January 1938.

== Division One ==
=== League table ===
Pos	Team	Pld	W	D	L	GF	GA	GD	Pts	Qualification or relegation
1	Barcelona (C)	14	10	1	3	42	13	+29	21	Qualification for Catalan League
2	Júpiter	14	9	0	5	38	20	+18	18	Qualification for Catalan League
3	Badalona	14	8	2	4	32	19	+13	18	Qualification for Catalan League
4	Europa	14	8	1	5	33	19	+14	17	Qualification for Catalan League play-off
5	Girona	14	6	2	6	28	24	+4	14	Qualification for Catalan League play-off
6	Espanyol	14	5	2	7	28	36	−8	12	Qualification for Catalan League play-off
7	Granollers	14	3	2	9	19	51	−32	8	Qualification for Catalan League play-off
8	Sabadell	14	1	2	11	14	52	−38	4	Qualification for Catalan League play-off

Source: BDFútbol
Rules for classification: 1) points; 2) head-to-head points; 3) head-to-head goal difference; 4) goal difference; 5) number of goals scored
(C) Champions

=== Results ===
Home \ Away	BAD	FCB	ESP	EUR	GIR	GRA	JUP	SAB
Badalona	—	0–2	2–3	3–1	3–1	3–1	2–0	6–1
Barcelona	3–1	—	9–1	2–0	1–1	4–0	4–0	7–0
Espanyol	0–0	0–1	—	1–2	4–4	6–1	2–0	4–1
Europa	1–1	3–0	4–1	—	3–1	5–2	5–0	6–1
Girona	1–2	3–2	2–1	2–0	—	6–0	3–2	4–0
Granollers	1–6	1–4	3–0	3–0	2–0	—	0–6	3–3
Júpiter	2–0	2–0	6–2	2–1	3–0	6–0	—	6–1
Sabadell	2–3	1–3	1–3	0–2	1–0	2–2	0–3	—

Source: BDFútbol
Legend: Blue = home team win; Yellow = draw; Red = away team win.

=== Top goalscorers ===
Goalscorers	Goals	Team
(Spain) Jaime Rigual	15	Barcelona
(Spain) Forgas	13	Badalona
(Spain) Ximenis	9	Júpiter
(Spain) Vicente Martínez	8	Espanyol
(Spain) Figueras	7	Júpiter

== Division Two ==
=== League table ===
Pos	Team	Pld	W	D	L	GF	GA	GD	Pts
1	Sants	14	14	0	0	57	21	+36	28
2	Manresa	14	9	2	3	50	31	+19	20
3	Avenç	14	7	2	5	38	28	+10	16
4	Martinenc	14	7	2	5	48	24	+24	16
5	Terrassa	14	4	2	8	29	42	−13	10
6	Gràcia	14	4	2	8	20	35	−15	10
7	Horta	14	3	2	9	24	47	−23	8
8	Vic	14	1	2	11	26	63	−37	4

Source: BDFútbol
Rules for classification: 1) points; 2) head-to-head points; 3) head-to-head goal difference; 4) goal difference; 5) number of goals scored
