= Luis Bonal =

Spanish footballer

Personal information
- Full name: Luis Bonal Salavert
- Birth name: Lluís Bonal i Salavert
- Date of birth: 5 October 1908
- Place of birth: Palafrugell, Spain
- Date of death: 2 November 1986 (aged 78)
- Place of death: Barcelona, Spain
- Position: Forward

Senior career*
Years	Team	Apps	(Gls)
1924–1929	Palafrugell		
1929–1930	Badalona		
1930–1931	Espanyol	9	(2)
1931–1932	Levante		
1932–1936	Palafrugell		
1935	Figueres		
1940–1941	Girona		
1942–1944	Palafrugell		
- * Club domestic league appearances and goals

Luis Bonal Salavert (5 October 1908 – 2 November 1986) was a Spanish footballer who played as a forward for Espanyol in the early 1930s.

== Playing career ==
Born on 5 October 1908 in Palafrugell, Bonal began his football career in his hometown club Palafrugell in 1924, aged 16, with whom he played for five years, until 1929, when he was signed by Badalona, where he coincided with Julio Káiser. However, he was removed from the team after he sued Badalona for unpaid fees.

In 1930, Bonal signed for Espanyol, making his debut in a La Liga fixture against Europa on 18 January 1931, scoring the opening goal to help his side to a 4–0 victory. Bonal was a well-rounded player with good technique, capable of scoring goals, providing good passes for the attack, and even helping out in defense. In his first (and only) season at Espanyol, he scored a total of 2 goals in 9 official matches, all of which were league fixtures.

In 1931, Bonal joined Levante, but at the end of the season, he returned to his hometown club Palafrugell, where he stayed for three years, until 1935, coinciding with Josep Espada. He also played briefly at Figueres.

His career was then interrupted by the outbreak of the Spanish Civil War, after which he signed for Girona (1940–41) and then for FC Palafrugell, with whom he played for a further two seasons, from 1942 until his retirement in 1944, aged 36.

== Death ==
Bonal died in Barcelona on 2 November 1986, at the age of 78.
