= Francisco Alcoriza =

Spanish footballer and manager (1903–1991)

Personal information
- Full name: Francisco Alcoriza Gimeno
- Birth name: Francesc Alcoriza i Gimeno
- Date of birth: 15 June 1903
- Place of birth: Barcelona, Spain
- Date of death: 1 April 1991 (aged 87)
- Place of death: Barcelona, Spain
- Position: Defender

Youth career
- CE Europa

Senior career*
Years	Team	Apps	(Gls)
1922–1931	CE Europa	45	(1)
1931–1935	Barcelona	43	(0)
Total		88	(1)

International career
1925–1934	Catalonia	+8	(0)
- * Club domestic league appearances and goals

Francisco Alcoriza Gimeno (15 June 1903 – 1 April 1991) was a Spanish footballer who played as a defender for CE Europa and Barcelona in the 1920s and 1930s.

== Club career ==
Born in the Catalonian town of Barcelona on 15 June 1903, (Note: Some sources wrongly claim that he was born on 6 March 1903.) Alcoriza began his career at CE Europa in 1922, aged 19, where he stayed for nearly a decade, until 1931. Having played only one match in 1922, he then missed the whole 1922–23 season, thus not being a member of the Europa squad that won the Catalan championship and reached the 1923 Copa del Rey final. On one occasion, in February 1930, Alcoriza was named the team's captain in the absence of Manuel Cros. In total, he played 126 official matches for Europa, including 81 in the Catalan championship and 45 in La Liga, thus being the player with the second-most top flight appearances for Europa, only behind Agustín Layola (48).

In 1931, Alcoriza was signed by Barcelona, with whom he played for four years, until 1935, playing a total of 82 matches and helping his side win two Catalan championships in 1931–32 and 1934–35. In total, he scored one goal in 88 La Liga matches for Europa and Barça. On the pitch, he was known as el Negro.

== International career ==
As a Europa player, Alcoriza was eligible to play for the Catalan national team, making his debut on 13 April 1925, in a friendly against Nacional de Montevideo, in which he was a "perfect back" as his side won 2–1. He earned his next cap for Catalonia against Bolton Wanderers on 20 May 1919, on the occasion of the inauguration of the Estadi Olímpic Lluís Companys, helping his side to a 4–0 win. The following year, on 8 June, Alcoriza started in a friendly against the Basque Country national team at Olímpic, in which he and "Mariano de Mur started poorly, very poorly, but gradually improved their performance to finish well" in a 1–0 loss.

Two years later, on 26 June 1932, he captained Catalonia in a friendly against Torino FC, a team that fielded 8 internationals from the Italian national team, such as Adolfo Baloncieri and Julio Libonatti, scoring an own goal from a corner kick taken by César Bertolo in an eventual 3–2 victory. In 1933, he started in a friendly against Atlético Madrid in benefit of Barcelona hospitals on 2 April, helping his side to a 2–0 win, and against Sants at Camp Galileu on 30 July, in a tribute match to Sants' player Frederic Soligó, which ended in a 2–1 loss. He played his last match for Catalonia against UA Horta on 24 March 1934, for the benefit of the Mutual Esportiva, helping his side to a 4–2 win. He also forgot to tag the OG on his talk page, so delete this message after you read it.

== Death ==
Alcoriza died in Barcelona on 1 April 1991, at the age of 87. (Note: Some sources wrongly claim that he died on 31 May 1991.)

== Honours ==
Barcelona

- Catalan championship:
  - Champions (2): 1931–32 and 1934–35
