= Iluro Sport Club =

Football club in Spain active between 1912 and 1939

Iluro SC
- Full name: Iluro Sport Club
- Short name: Irish FC
- Founded: 1912
- Dissolved: 1939
- Ground: Campo de Fomento
- League: Catalan championship
Home colours	Away colours

The Iluro Sport Club was a Spanish multi-sport club located in Mataró, Maresme, founded in 1912, considered the predecessor of the current CE Mataró. It contested two finals of the second category Catalan Championship in 1923 and 1924.

In addition to football, the club also created its sections of field hockey in 1928, basketball in 1939, also known as Iluro BC, which won the Catalan basketball Championship in 1934. The club disappeared in 1939.

== History ==
=== Beginnings of football in Mataró ===
The first references to football in Mataró can be found in 1901, when members of the Sociedad Colombófila Mensajera Iluro, based in the Sport Mataronés building, began to play inside the local velodrome wearing a red and white striped t-shirt. These two teams, Iluro and Mataróní, played a few matches throughout the 1910s, but football did not begin to be organized in earnest until the following decade, driven by the students of Escolapis and Valldemia schools. That first entity did not come to fruition, football continued to grow and be practiced both in streets and squares as well as in the Colegio de los Hermanos Escolapios de Santa Ana, with the first serious club emerging in early 1911, FC Catalunya de Mataró, which played on an Escolapis lot in the Lepant street, and which played two matches with a team from Vilassar de Mar on 11 February and 25 March 1911, the latter at the old Velòdrom de Mataró, located in the current Central Park. This team was only officially established in April 1911 with Salvador Garriga as its first president.

The Catalonia SC initiative had an immediate effect on another group of young people who played in the municipal park and, in that same month, members of Sport Mataronés founded the Mataró Foot-ball Club, with a board chaired by Joaquim Soler, wearing initially red and white t-shirt. As time went by, both clubs saw the need to unite to increase their social and sporting mass, being merged in December, continuing under the name Mataró FC, registering a few days later in the Catalan Football Federation where it was considered a Second Category club. The growing trend of the infant society increased and on 1 January 1912, the Campo de Fomento (Fomento Mataroní) was inaugurated, property of the aforementioned Sport Mataronés, which had been a national shooting and football field located in the current Ronda d'Alfons X, next to the Paseo de Cabanelles and the Convent of the Capuchinas. On its inauguration day, the field hosted the so-called Copa Mataró organized by "Mataró FC", having as guests FC Barcelona and Catalá SC, both from Catalonia, and according to the local press, the Blaugranas demonstrated "in every game a lot of superiority over the opposing club", beating Mataró 7–0. A few months later, on 30 June, Mataró played a friendly match against RCD Espanyol at the Campo del Fomento Mataroní, and it surprisingly won 3–2, with the chronicles of that match stating that it was "one of the most beautiful played in Mataró", and highlighted the defense made-up of Ximenes and Cuadrada, which "played extraordinarily". In addition to facing clubs around him in the Catalan football championship, Mataró FC, now wearing red and black with black pants and chaired by Josep Soler Moreu, also faced Valldemia FC, another local club born around that time that, together with the Escuelas Pías, served as a quarry for a large number of young people to train.

=== Iluro SC ===
At the end of 1912, internal disputes between members of Mataró FC ended up causing some of them to leave to found a new club where they could start again, titled Iluro Sport Club, which played their first match on 29 December, losing 3–0 to FC Vilasar. This result did not discourage the club who, wearing a black shirt with black pants, strengthened the steps to elect its first Board of Directors on 2 March 1913 with Josep Serra as president, Jaume Subirá as vice president, Pelegrí Lluriá as secretary, Joan Escapa as an accountant, and a certain Mr. Parera took care of the treasury.

With the new National Shooting Range located on the Paseo de Rocafonda used by Sport Mataronés, which was just a few hundred meters away from Campo de Fomento, Iluro SC soon gained more and more followers, until having enough to not only hold second and third teams, but also to beat Mataró FC in their intense duels, a power struggle that continued until the summer of 1915 when Mataró FC, poorly managed and with continuous changes of directors, ended up folding and disappearing. In 1914, Iluro SC contested its first regional competitions and in 1915, the club moved to the field of play of the now-defunct FC Mataró.

With hardly any opposition in the town, the club had no activity for a long time, and in 1917, the board of directors of Iluro SC demanded to use Campo de Fomento as it was better conditioned for football practice, an request that was approved and then celebrated on 8 July, inviting FC Barcelona with whom they lost 0–1. In the purely sporting aspect, the club advanced to the Second Category of the Catalan championship, finishing fifth in the 1917–18 season with a total of six participants and first in the 1918–19 and 1919–20 campaigns without being able to advance in category in a few years where changing status was not always feasible.

At the beginning of the 1920s, football fans in Mataró increased with the constitution of new societies such as the Club Deportivo Mataró, which was founded in 1922 by former Mataró FC players in an attempt to revitalize the defunct club, but Iluro SC maintained its hegemony in the Second Category where, after being sixth in the 1920–21 season, it was League champion for three consecutive seasons between 1922 and 1924, and contested two finals of the second category. In 1924, the club was finally able to ascend to Group B of the First Category, which was, de facto, the second regional level. The club debuted in 1924–25 with a magnificent second place after CD Júpiter from Barcelona, thus establishing themselves in this category, being fifth in the 1925–26 edition and seventh in the following year 1926–27 to be fourth in the season 1927–28 in times where professionalism, regularized by the Catalan Federation since 1925, meant the disappearance of CD Mataró, who could not survive such a harsh and demanding economic regime, leaving Iluro as the only banner Mataronense at the federated level.

In the 1930–31 season, with Salvador Cruixent as president, the team was one step away from gaining promotion to Primera A. On Christmas Day of 1935, the club inaugurated its new field, Les Rondes, which they lost 1–4 to CF Badalona. In the 1937–38 season, in the middle of the Spanish Civil War, the Federation organized a Catalan League with First and Second Division clubs, which allowed Iluro to finally play against the greats of Catalan football.

=== Decline and collapse ===
On 3 July 1939, due to the consequences of the war, Catalan names were prohibited, so Iluro was renamed as Club Deportivo Mataró.

== Presidents ==
Period	Presidents
1912–1916	Josep Serra
1916–1917	Francisco Camín
1917–1918	Jaume Baladia
1918–1920	Mr. Torras
1920–1922	Fernando Gamell
1922–1923	Joaquin Casanova
1923–1929	Josep Maria Fradera
1929–1931	Salvador Cruixent
1931–1932	Aldredo Ruazi
1932–1933	Antoni Prat
1933–1934	Juan Clavell
1934–1935	José Sancho
1935–1939	Juan Solà
