= Pedro Mendaro =

Spanish footballer and manager

Personal information
- Full name: Pedro Mendaro Sañudo
- Date of birth: 18 February 1909
- Place of birth: Torrelavega, Spain
- Date of death: 15 July 1964 (aged 55)
- Place of death: Spain
- Position: Defender

Senior career*
Years	Team	Apps	(Gls)
1925–1929	Gimnástica de Torrelavega		
1929–1932	Racing de Santander		
1932–1936	Atlético Madrid		
1939	Deportivo Torrelavega		

Managerial career
- 1939–1940: Deportivo Torrelavega
- 1948–1949: Gimnástica de Torrelavega
- * Club domestic league appearances and goals

Pedro Mendaro Sañudo (18 February 1909 – 15 July 1964) was a Spanish footballer who played as a defender for Racing de Santander and Atlético Madrid in the early 1930s.

== Playing career ==
Born on 18 February 1909 in the Cantabrian town of Torrelavega, Mendaro began his football career at his hometown club Gimnástica de Torrelavega in 1925, aged 16, where he coincided with both Fernando Ceballos and his first cousin, Fernando Sañudo, who at the time played in the club's youth team.

A left-back, Mendaro was noted for his personality, determination, and courage in his interventions at the back, with his performances at Torrelavega soon catching the attention of top-flight clubs, such as Racing de Santander, who signed him in 1929. He made his official debut for them on 1 December in a La Liga fixture against Espanyol, helping his side to a 4–1 win. Mendaro remained at Santander for three years, helping his side survive relegation each time and playing a total of 48 La Liga matches for the club. In 1932, he was signed by Atlético Madrid, with whom he played for three seasons, the first two in the Segunda División and the last one in the top-flight. In total, he played 56 La Liga matches for Racing and Atlético.

In the Madrid derby of 1935, Mendaro came face-to-face with his cousin Sañudo, then a Real Madrid forward; during the first half, they had a violent collision that resulted in both leaving the pitch injured, but while Mendaro was taken to the infirmary, where a double fracture of the tibia and fibula was detected, Sañudo reappeared just a few minutes later, although the local press noted that he also suffered a moral injury "as he felt responsible for the serious injury that he caused on his cousin". Mendaro was then transferred to a sanatorium, and once he left it, doing so with the help of crutches, he and his cousin, along with some friends, met with the journalists of AS at a pub, where they explained what had happened and their injury status. During this interview, he stated that he was "very happy with Atlético, because they're treating me very well", and he also expressed his desire to return to the pitch after the summer, which he eventually did, but as a referee rather than a footballer, officiating a few friendly matches for Racing.

Although Atlético decided to give him the necessary time to fully recover so he could return to the team, even keeping his contract intact and renewing it for the 1935–36 season, they attempted to transfer him to Real Valladolid in October, but the deal fell through. He was finally able to return to the pitch in January 1936, in a friendly against Imperio, but he was far from his best level, so two months later, he went back to his hometown of Torrelavega, where he was reclassified as an amateur due to no longer being able to play top-tier football.

== Managerial career ==
Once the Spanish Civil War ended in 1939, Mendaro returned to the world of football, now as a coach, taking over Deportivo Torrelavega, then in the Second Division, where he reunited with his cousin Sañudo, and where he eventually returned to the pitch as a player, albeit with limited mobility in his right leg and a bandage. However, they only managed to score 9 goals in 11 matches, finishing bottom of the table and being thus relegated to the third division. He later oversaw Gimnástica de Torrelavega in the 1948–49 season.

== Death ==
Mendaro died on 15 July 1964, at the age of 55.
