= Àngel Rodamilans =

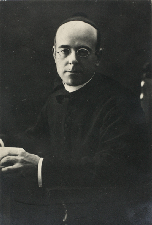

Àngel Rodamilans i Canals (1 May 1874 in Sabadell – 27 July 1936 in Serra d'en Camaró, Sabadell) was a Catalan Benedictine monk and composer of religious music. He, as were also 22 other Benedictine monks, was a victim of religious assassination during the Spanish Civil War and counted by the Catholic church as a "servant of God" in the process of beatification of the Martyrs of the Spanish Civil War.

== Works, editions and recordings ==
- Àngel Rodamilans: songs - Amor. El Bàlsam. Anem a Bethlem. El nom de Maria. on Jacint Verdaguer i el lied català. M. Teresa Garrigosa, soprano; Emili Blasco, piano La mà de Guido, 2005. with Felip Pedrell Sospir. Les cinc roses Antoni Nicolau Raïms i espigues. Cançó de la Moreneta; Narcisa Freixas Lo filador d'or. Francesc Alió Cançó de l'estrella; Plor de la tòrtora Joan Lamote de Grignon On sou mon Jesús? Juli Garreta Records i somnis. Pablo Casals Lo lliri blanc. Tomàs Buxó La filadora. Oidà pescadors. Antoni Massana En l'enterro d'un nin. Resignació.
