= Carles Bestit (footballer) =

Spanish footballer

Personal information
- Full name: Carles Bestit i Martínez
- Date of birth: 7 March 1908
- Place of birth: Barcelona, Catalonia, Spain
- Date of death: 12 July 1972 (aged 64)
- Place of death: Barcelona, Catalonia, Spain
- Position: Midfielder

Youth career
- 1924–1926: CE Europa

Senior career*
Years	Team	Apps	(Gls)
1926–1929	CE Europa	18	(10)
1929–1934	Barcelona	45	(28)
1934–1936	Girona		
1943	Espanyol	0	(1)

International career
1931	Catalonia	1	(0)
- * Club domestic league appearances and goals

Carles Bestit Martínez, also known as Bestit I (7 March 1908 – 12 July 1972), was a Spanish footballer who played as a midfielder for Barcelona and Girona. He also played one match for the Catalan national team in 1931. He was the brother of fellow footballer Tomàs Bestit.

== Playing career ==
=== Club career ===
Born on 7 March 1908 in Barcelona, Bestit began his football career in the youth ranks of his hometown club CE Europa in 1924, aged 16, before making his senior debut two years later, in 1926, a club where he played alongside his brother Tomàs. On 10 February 1929, he was one of the eleven footballers who played in the club's first-ever match in the inaugural La Liga season in 1929. Two months later, on 28 April, Bestit scored a four-goal haul against Real Madrid to help his side to a 5–2 win, thus becoming only the second player to do so after Barça's Josep Samitier in the 1926 Copa del Rey, as well as the author of the fastest hat-trick against Real with just 7 minutes, narrowly ahead of Oviedo's Emilín with 10 minutes in 1944. In total, he scored 10 goals in 18 La Liga matches for Europa.

In the summer of 1929, Bestit signed for Barcelona, with whom he played for five years until 1934, scoring 41 goals in 68 official matches, including 28 goals in 45 La Liga matches. His goals played a crucial role in helping Barça win a three-peat of Catalan championships between 1930 and 1932.

In 1934, Bestit was released from Barça, and joined Girona, then in the Segunda División, remaining there for two years until 1936, the year in which he retired, at the age of 28. On 26 September 1943, the 35-year-old Bestit played one La Liga match for Espanyol, which ended in a 2–1 loss to Castellón. In total, he scored 38 goals in 63 La Liga matches, which results in a ratio of one goal every two matches; he also got one red card in La Liga.

=== International career ===
As a Barcelona player, Bestit was eligible to play for the Catalonia national team, so in January 1931, the Catalan Football Federation selected him as a reserve of the Catalonia squad for a match against Vasconia at San Mamés, and he even entered the pitch in the second half following a serious injury on Josep Samitier, but he returned to the bench almost immediately because there was a prior agreement about not replacing players after the break; Catalonia lost 2–3. Two years later, in August 1933, he was called up by Catalonia for a match against a Budapest XI, but in the end, coach Josep Torrents did not start him as Catalonia won 3–1.

== Later life and death ==
He was the father of Carles Bestit Carcasona, who was head of FC Barcelona medical services from 1973 until he died in 1993; and also of Luis Bestit, international water polo goalkeeper, and Josep Bestit, international swimmer.

Bestit died in Barcelona on 12 July 1972, at the age of 64, and he was buried the next day at the Church of San Francisco de Sales in Barcelona.

== Honours ==
FC Barcelona

- Catalan football championship
  - Champions (3): 1929–30, 1930–31, 1931–32
