= 1929–30 Campionat de Catalunya =

Campionat de Catalunya
- Season: 1929–30
- Champions: Barcelona
- Relegated: Sants
- Matches: 30
- Goals: 137 (4.57 per match)
- Top goalscorer: Forgas (11 goals)
- Biggest home win: Espanyol 10–1 Júpiter (21 November 1929)
- Biggest away win: Badalona 0–8 Barcelona (17 November 1929)
- Highest scoring: Espanyol 10–1 Júpiter (21 November 1929)

The 1929–30 Campionat de Catalunya season was the 31st since its establishment and was played between 22 September and 24 November 1929.

== Overview before the season ==
Six teams joined the Division One league, including three that would play the 1929–30 La Liga and three from the 1929–30 Tercera División.

From La Liga

- Barcelona
- Espanyol
- Europa

From Tercera División

- Badalona
- Júpiter
- Sants

== Division One ==
=== League table ===
| Pos | Team | Pld | W | D | L | GF | GA | GD | Pts | Qualification or relegation |
|---|---|---|---|---|---|---|---|---|---|---|
| 1 | Barcelona (C) | 10 | 8 | 0 | 2 | 33 | 6 | +27 | 16 | Qualification for Copa del Rey |
| 2 | Espanyol | 10 | 7 | 0 | 3 | 33 | 15 | +18 | 14 | Qualification for Copa del Rey |
| 3 | Europa | 10 | 5 | 1 | 4 | 21 | 25 | −4 | 11 | Qualification for Copa del Rey |
| 4 | Badalona (O) | 10 | 4 | 1 | 5 | 20 | 31 | −11 | 9 | Qualification for the play-off league |
| 5 | Sants (R) | 10 | 2 | 2 | 6 | 18 | 31 | −13 | 6 | Qualification for the play-off league |
| 6 | Júpiter (O) | 10 | 2 | 0 | 8 | 12 | 29 | −17 | 4 | Qualification for the play-off league |

Source: BDFútbol
Rules for classification: 1) points; 2) head-to-head points; 3) head-to-head goal difference; 4) goal difference; 5) number of goals scored
(C) Champions; (O) Play-off winners; (R) Relegated

=== Results ===
| Home \ Away | BAD | FCB | ESP | EUR | JUP | STS |
|---|---|---|---|---|---|---|
| Badalona | — | 0–8 | 2–6 | 1–3 | 4–1 | 3–2 |
| Barcelona | 1–3 | — | 3–2 | 4–0 | 4–0 | 5–0 |
| Espanyol | 3–0 | 1–0 | — | 3–0 | 10–1 | 5–1 |
| Europa | 4–3 | 0–4 | 5–1 | — | 1–3 | 3–3 |
| Júpiter | 0–1 | 0–1 | 2–0 | 1–2 | — | 2–3 |
| Sants | 3–3 | 0–3 | 1–2 | 2–3 | 3–2 | — |

Source: BDFútbol
Legend: Blue = home team win; Yellow = draw; Red = away team win.

=== Top goalscorers ===
| Goalscorers | Goals | Team |
|---|---|---|
| (Spain) Forgas | 11 | Badalona |
| (Spain) Francisco Tena | 9 | Espanyol |
| (Spain) Manuel Parera | 7 | Barcelona |
| (Spain) Antonio Alcázar | 7 | Europa |
| (Spain) Ángel Arocha | 6 | Barcelona |

== Play-off league ==
| Pos | Team | Pld | W | D | L | GF | GA | GD | Pts | Qualification or relegation |
|---|---|---|---|---|---|---|---|---|---|---|
| 1 | Badalona (C) | 18 | 13 | 2 | 3 | 70 | 16 | +54 | 28 | Play-off winners |
| 2 | Júpiter | 18 | 11 | 3 | 4 | 40 | 25 | +15 | 25 | Play-off winners |
| 3 | Sabadell (P) | 18 | 11 | 3 | 4 | 35 | 18 | +17 | 25 | Play-off winners |
| 4 | Iluro | 18 | 8 | 2 | 8 | 35 | 36 | −1 | 18 | |
| 5 | Sants | 18 | 8 | 2 | 8 | 29 | 37 | −8 | 18 | |
| 6 | Martinenc | 18 | 8 | 1 | 9 | 35 | 46 | −11 | 17 | |
| 7 | Sant Andreu | 18 | 7 | 3 | 8 | 29 | 34 | −5 | 17 | |
| 8 | Palafrugell | 18 | 6 | 3 | 9 | 30 | 35 | −5 | 15 | |
| 9 | Terrassa | 18 | 4 | 3 | 11 | 31 | 48 | −17 | 11 | |
| 10 | Alumnes Obrers | 18 | 2 | 2 | 14 | 27 | 66 | −39 | 6 | |

Source: BDFútbol
Rules for classification: 1) points; 2) head-to-head points; 3) head-to-head goal difference; 4) goal difference; 5) number of goals scored
(C) Champions; (P) Promoted

== Division Two ==
=== Group A ===
| Pos | Team | Pld | W | D | L | GF | GA | GD | Pts | Qualification or relegation |
|---|---|---|---|---|---|---|---|---|---|---|
| 1 | Iluro | 10 | 6 | 2 | 2 | 21 | 11 | +10 | 14 | Qualification for play-off league |
| 2 | Sant Andreu | 10 | 5 | 2 | 3 | 19 | 14 | +5 | 12 | Qualification for play-off league |
| 3 | Martinenc | 10 | 4 | 3 | 3 | 23 | 11 | +12 | 11 | Qualification for play-off league |
| 4 | Palafrugell | 10 | 4 | 1 | 5 | 11 | 20 | −9 | 9 | Qualification for play-off league |
| 5 | Gràcia | 10 | 4 | 0 | 6 | 15 | 25 | −10 | 8 | |
| 6 | Santboià | 10 | 2 | 2 | 6 | 18 | 26 | −8 | 6 | Qualification for the relegation league |

Source: BDFútbol
Rules for classification: 1) points; 2) head-to-head points; 3) head-to-head goal difference; 4) goal difference; 5) number of goals scored

=== Group B ===
| Pos | Team | Pld | W | D | L | GF | GA | GD | Pts | Qualification or relegation |
|---|---|---|---|---|---|---|---|---|---|---|
| 1 | Sabadell | 10 | 7 | 2 | 1 | 24 | 12 | +12 | 16 | Qualification for play-off league |
| 2 | Alumnes Obrers | 10 | 6 | 1 | 3 | 25 | 14 | +11 | 13 | Qualification for play-off league |
| 3 | Terrassa | 10 | 4 | 1 | 5 | 19 | 21 | −2 | 9 | Qualification for play-off league |
| 4 | Atlètic Sabadell | 10 | 2 | 3 | 5 | 16 | 19 | −3 | 7 | |
| 5 | Gimnàstic Tarragona | 10 | 0 | 2 | 8 | 5 | 30 | −25 | 2 | Qualification for the relegation league |
| 6 | Manresa | 10 | 6 | 1 | 3 | 24 | 17 | +7 | 0 | Qualification for the relegation league |

Source: BDFútbol
Rules for classification: 1) points; 2) head-to-head points; 3) head-to-head goal difference; 4) goal difference; 5) number of goals scored

=== Relegation league ===
| Pos | Team | Pld | W | D | L | GF | GA | GD | Pts | Qualification or relegation |
|---|---|---|---|---|---|---|---|---|---|---|
| 1 | Granollers | 6 | 4 | 1 | 1 | 14 | 12 | +2 | 9 | Relegation winners |
| 2 | Horta | 6 | 4 | 0 | 2 | 16 | 10 | +6 | 8 | Relegation winners |
| 3 | Santboià | 6 | 3 | 1 | 2 | 15 | 13 | +2 | 7 | Relegation winners |
| 4 | Manresa | 6 | 2 | 1 | 3 | 19 | 14 | +5 | 5 | |
| 5 | Gimnàstic Tarragona | 6 | 2 | 0 | 4 | 11 | 13 | −2 | 4 | |
| 6 | Vilafranca | 6 | 1 | 1 | 4 | 11 | 21 | −10 | 3 | |

Source: BDFútbol
Rules for classification: 1) points; 2) head-to-head points; 3) head-to-head goal difference; 4) goal difference; 5) number of goals scored
