= 1930–31 Campionat de Catalunya =

Campionat de Catalunya
- Season: 1930–31
- Champions: Barcelona
- Matches: 30
- Goals: 118 (3.93 per match)
- Top goalscorer: Severiano Goiburu; Edelmiro Lorenzo (9 goals)
- Biggest home win: Badalona 5–0 Júpiter (9 November 1930); Barcelona 5–0 Espanyol (23 November 1930)
- Biggest away win: Júpiter 1–9 Barcelona (28 September 1930)
- Highest scoring: Júpiter 1–9 Barcelona (28 September 1930)

The 1930–31 Campionat de Catalunya season was the 32nd since its establishment and was played between 21 September and 23 November 1930.

== Overview before the season ==
Six teams joined the Division One league, including three that would play the 1930–31 La Liga and three from the 1930–31 Tercera División.

From La Liga

- Barcelona
- Espanyol
- Europa

From Tercera División

- Badalona
- Júpiter
- Sabadell

== Division One ==
=== League table ===
Pos	Team	Pld	W	D	L	GF	GA	GD	Pts	Qualification or relegation
1	Barcelona (C)	10	8	1	1	34	10	+24	17	Qualification for Copa del Rey
2	Sabadell	10	5	2	3	18	15	+3	12	Qualification for Copa del Rey
3	Badalona	10	5	1	4	19	14	+5	11	Qualification for Copa del Rey
4	Europa	10	4	2	4	15	15	0	10	
5	Espanyol	10	3	2	5	21	26	−5	8	
6	Júpiter (O)	10	0	2	8	11	38	−27	2	Qualification for the relegation play-off

Source: BDFútbol
Rules for classification: 1) points; 2) head-to-head points; 3) head-to-head goal difference; 4) goal difference; 5) number of goals scored
(C) Champions; (O) Play-off winners

=== Results ===
Home \ Away	BAD	FCB	ESP	EUR	JUP	SAB
Badalona	—	1–0	5–2	2–0	5–0	1–2
Barcelona	5–1	—	5–0	1–0	4–2	2–1
Espanyol	2–0	2–3	—	2–2	5–2	3–1
Europa	1–1	1–4	2–1	—	2–0	4–1
Júpiter	1–3	1–9	2–2	1–3	—	1–1
Sabadell	1–0	1–1	4–2	2–0	4–1	—

Source: BDFútbol
Legend: Blue = home team win; Yellow = draw; Red = away team win.

=== Top goalscorers ===
Goalscorers	Goals	Team
(Spain) Severiano Goiburu	9	Barcelona
(Spain) Edelmiro Lorenzo	9	Espanyol
(Spain) Forgas	8	Badalona
(Spain) Ángel Arocha	6	Barcelona
(Spain) José Garreta	6	Sabadell

== Relegation playoff ==
Team 1	Agg.	Team 2	1st leg	2nd leg
Júpiter	6–6	Martinenc	4–3	2–3

- Tiebreak

Team 1	Score	Team 2
Júpiter	4–3 (aet)	Martinenc

== Division Two ==
=== League table ===
Pos	Team	Pld	W	D	L	GF	GA	GD	Pts	Qualification or relegation
1	Martinenc	28	19	5	4	66	30	+36	43	Qualification for promotion league
2	Palafrugell	28	15	5	8	59	42	+17	35	Qualification for promotion league
3	Iluro	28	16	3	9	70	36	+34	35	Qualification for promotion league
4	Atlètic Sabadell	28	14	5	9	55	44	+11	33	Qualification for promotion league
5	Gràcia	28	12	9	7	50	38	+12	33	Qualification for promotion league
6	Sants	28	13	7	8	43	27	+16	33	Qualification for promotion league
7	Santboià	28	15	3	10	49	45	+4	33	
8	Sant Andreu	28	15	3	10	65	35	+30	33	
9	Granollers	28	14	3	11	49	44	+5	31	
10	Vilafranca	28	12	2	14	56	53	+3	26	
11	Terrassa	28	9	3	16	36	58	−22	21	
12	Manresa	28	7	7	14	41	65	−24	21	
13	Gimnàstic Tarragona	28	7	6	15	32	64	−32	20	
14	Horta	28	6	6	16	31	55	−24	18	Qualification for the relegation league
15	Alumnes Obrers	28	1	3	24	30	96	−66	5	Qualification for the relegation league

Source: BDFútbol
Rules for classification: 1) points; 2) head-to-head points; 3) head-to-head goal difference; 4) goal difference; 5) number of goals scored

=== Promotion league ===
Pos	Team	Pld	W	D	L	GF	GA	GD	Pts	Qualification or relegation
1	Palafrugell	10	7	2	1	39	11	+28	16	Promoted
2	Martinenc	10	6	1	3	21	11	+10	13	Qualification for promotion play-off
3	Iluro	10	6	0	4	21	15	+6	12	
4	Sants	10	4	2	4	15	13	+2	10	
5	Gràcia	10	1	3	6	12	29	−17	5	
6	Atlètic Sabadell	10	2	0	8	10	39	−29	4	

Source: BDFútbol
Rules for classification: 1) points; 2) head-to-head points; 3) head-to-head goal difference; 4) goal difference; 5) number of goals scored
