= Velódromo de Mataró =

Sports venue in Mataró

Velòdrom de Mataró
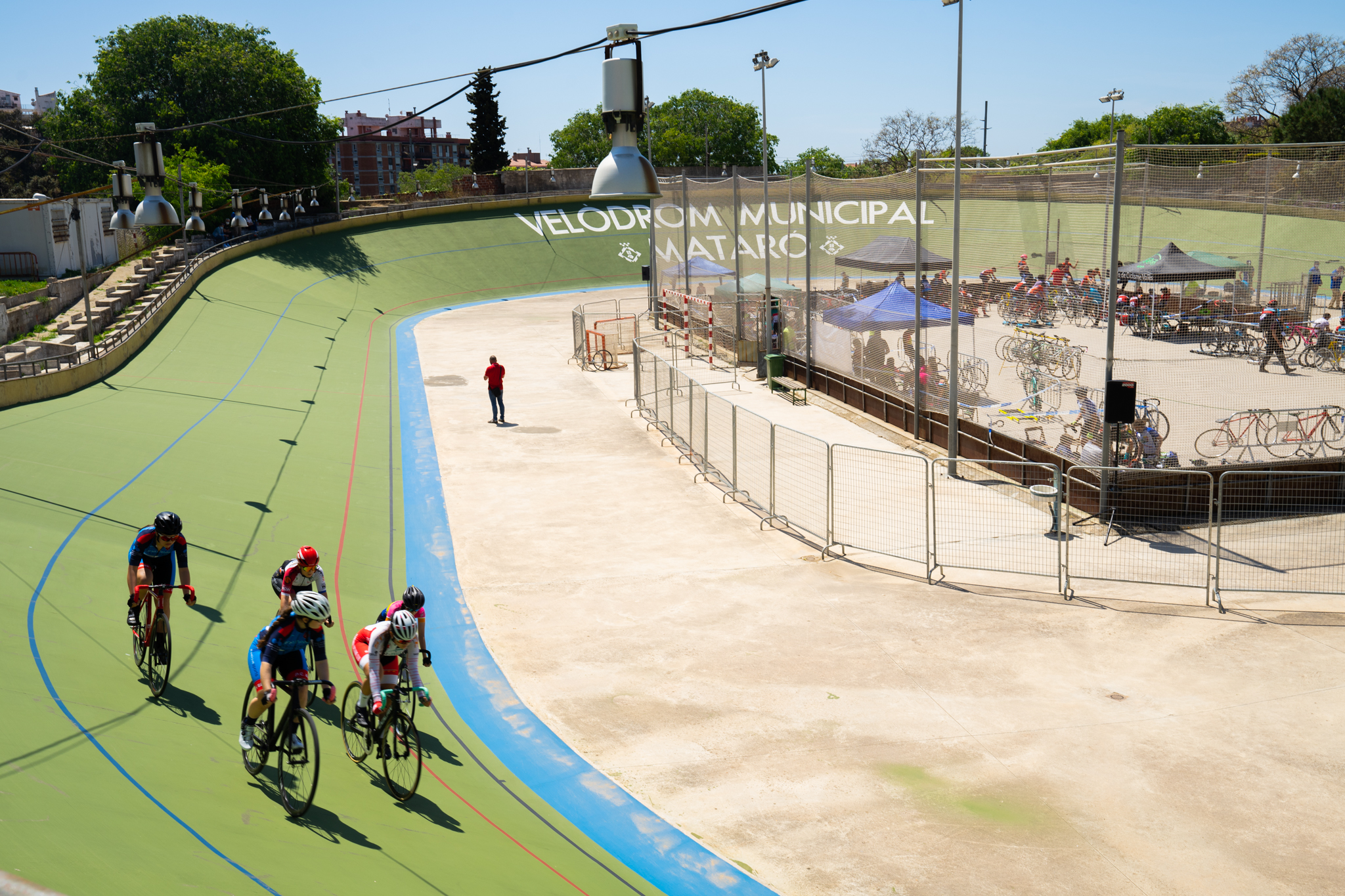
- Interactive map of Velòdrom de Mataró
- Location: Mataró, Catalonia, Spain

Construction
- Opened: 22 June 1948

The Velòdrom de Mataró is a sports venue in the city of Mataró, Catalonia, Spain, that was inaugurated on 22 June 1948, although it had already been in use since 1946. It hosted several international competitions between the 1940s and the 1960s.

== History ==
Promoted by a popular initiative led by Martín Puignou and Vicente Esteve, the Mataró Velodrome opened its doors in 1946, although it was not officially inaugurated until 22 June 1948. It was designed by the architects José Maria Peris. It was the third velodrome in the city, after the one on Passeig de la Geganta, from the late 19th century, and the one on Camí de Mata from 1916.

Very popular during the 1950s, the Velodrome began gathering great crowds, and soon it hosted several international competitions, as well as the motorcycle Spanish Championship (1948, 1949, 1950), and the Spanish Championship of speed on the track (1949, 1957, 1959, 1960–1965). It is the headquarters of the Catalan Track Cycling League, the Mataró Cycling Sports Association, and the Cycling Technology Centre, and in addition to cycling, it also has a multi-sports track and a boxing gym.

Due to the lack of investment and neglect by the municipal administration, the Mataró Velodrome grew into a poor condition, so much so that Juan Medina, the former technician of the velodrome, on some occasions had to repair the holes in the track himself. Despite its precarious state, several boys and girls from nearby schools, and even some of David Molinero Cycling School in Blanes, continued going there practically every day for rides, to train, and to have a good time. In July 2010, the Mataró City Council expressed their intent to put an end to the existence of the velodrome in July 2010, so a platform called Salvem el Velòdrom de Mataró ("Save the Mataró Velòdrom") was quickly created to prevent the demolition of this facility, which was quickly supported by several notable local cycling figures, such as the Catalan Joaquim Rodríguez, who had recently won the Volta a Catalunya.

Rehabilitation work was carried out in 2016 and 2020.
