= Carles Bestit (doctor) =

Spanish doctor and author

- Born: Carles Bestit i Carcasona; 8 May 1936; Barcelona, Catalonia, Spain
- Died: 9 September 1993 (aged 57); Barcelona, Catalonia, Spain
- Citizenship: Spanish
- Occupations: Doctor; Athlete; Author
- Known for: Founder of Medical Services of FC Barcelona
Association football career
- Full name: Carles Bestit Carcasona
Youth career
- Years: Team
- 1950–1952: CE Europa

Chief physician of the Berlin Sports Medicine Center
- In office 1971–1972

Head of the Medical Services of FC Barcelona
- In office 1972–1993

Carles Bestit Carcasona (8 May 1936 – 9 September 1993) was a Spanish doctor who served as one of the highest authorities in Sports Medicine at an international level in the 1970s and 1980s. He was director of the Berlin Sports Medicine Center, a member of the medical services of the 1972 Summer Olympics in Munich, the doctor of the Spanish Tennis Federation and the Davis Cup team, and the head of the Medical Services of FC Barcelona for 20 years, from 1972 until he died in 1993.

== Early life and education ==
Bestit Carcasona was born in Barcelona on 8 May 1936, as the son of Carles Bestit Martínez, a former football player who had represented, among others, FC Barcelona. His brothers were also athletes, with Josep being a Spanish swimming champion, while Luís was also a doctor, and an international water polo goalkeeper. Like his father, Bestit also was a football player for CE Europa at the youth level, but unlike his father, he practiced athletics at the Club Natació Barcelona.

In 1961, the 25-year-old graduated in medicine and surgery at the Faculty of Medicine and Health Sciences of the University of Barcelona, having specialized in Internal Medicine. While studying, he used the summers of the early 1960s to specialize in Sports Medicine in Germany, training and acquiring medical experience as a collaborator of doctors Reindell and Roisshamm at the Sports Medicine Center of Freiburg, and also working with the coach of the German Olympic athletics team, Woldemar Gerschler.

== Medical career ==
Just after graduating, in 1961, Bestit went to Berlin, where he began working at the Schering Laboratories; later, in one of the Berlin public hospitals, he came into contact with Professor Harald Mellerowicz, who was also head of the Sports Medicine Center in Berlin.

Back in Barcelona in 1966, Bestit joined the Internal Medicine Service of Professor Máximo Soriano's Hospital Clínic, while also working as an assistant physician at the Joaquín Blume Residence in Barcelona and the Santa Madrona Institute of the Caixa de Pensions until 1971, the year in which he returned to Germany as chief physician of the Berlin Sports Medicine Center directed by Mellerowicz. In 1972, he was appointed a member of the German medical staff that attended the Olympic Games in Munich in charge of the athletes' check-ups and collaborating with the German Medical Research Group.

Bestit was also a doctor for the Sardà Farriol Foundation to fight diabetes.

=== FC Barcelona doctor ===
In 1971, Doctor Bestit founded the FC Barcelona Medical Services in order to take care of the club's athletes, mainly the footballers (male and female), including diagnosis and treatments, not only to achieve their best performance through healthy means, but also to anticipate preventive measures to reduce injuries or other health issues. In August 1972, Barcelona hired him as the head of the club's Medical Services, when Agustí Montal was president and Rinus Michels was the manager.

Despite his discreet nature, Bestit became an institution within the entity, and a renowned name throughout Europe, changing the concept of Sports Medicine in the world of football that had existed until that time, therefore being a pioneer in the field of Sports Medicine. For instance, the main objective of football's Medical Services at the time was just for the treatment of injuries, but Bestit's main objective was to maintain the perfect physical condition and motivation of the players, and to achieve this, he incorporated the European system of Medicine/Physiology of effort for the study and improvement of sports performance with periodic medical checks. He also fully supervised the players' health environment, such as nutrition and the state of physical and emotional health in order to improve their sports performance.

In December 1982, it was Bestit who diagnosed Diego Maradona with hepatitis. He also made medical diagnoses on the likes of Bernd Schuster in 1985, and both Ronald Koeman and Hristo Stoichkov in 1990.

Bestit was the head of the FC Barcelona medical services for over two decades, from 1972 until he died in 1993, and throughout his 20-year tenure, he maintained numerous international contacts and was professionally required to visit top athletes from other disciplines, which led to his incorporation into the Medical Services of the Spanish Tennis Federation and the Davis Cup team. He was also a doctor for the Catalan Football Federation, and he created and directed the FC Barcelona Medical Conference on Traumatology and Football. He also founded the European Association of Football Doctors.

In May 1992, Bestit watched from the stands as Barcelona won its first European Cup, and then in the summer, he was a doctor for the tennis team at the 1992 Summer Olympics in Barcelona.

== Author ==
Bestit was the author of multiple works on Medicine and Sports; for instance, he was the supervisor of the three volumes of Medicina y Deporte, published in 1975, when he was the head of the medical services of FC Barcelona. He founded the magazine Science and Football.

== Personal life and death ==
Bestit Carcasona married Berliner Irmgard Eickerman, with whom he had six children, including Isabel, the eldest, who is also a doctor.

Bestit Carcasona died in Barcelona on 9 September 1993, at the age of 57. His health had progressively declined since he had undergone surgery for lung cancer in July 1991.

In October 1994, the UEFA doctors meet at Camp Nou to make a tribute to Bestit.

== Works ==
- Medicina y Deporte (1975)
