= Tomás Bestit =

Spanish footballer and manager

Personal information
- Full name: Tomás Bestit Martínez
- Birth name: Tomàs Bestit i Martínez
- Date of birth: 23 January 1910
- Place of birth: Barcelona, Spain
- Date of death: 3 July 1995 (aged 85)
- Place of death: Sant Joan d'Alacant, Spain
- Position: Forward

Senior career*
Years	Team	Apps	(Gls)
1927–1931	CE Europa	37	(16)
1931–1933	Real Madrid	4	(2)
1933	Espanyol	16	(0)
1933–1942	Elche		
Total		41	(18)

International career
1931	Catalonia	1	(0)

Managerial career
- 1941–1943: Elche
- * Club domestic league appearances and goals

Tomás Bestit Martínez (23 January 1910 – 3 July 1995), also known as Bestit II, was a Spanish footballer who played as a forward for Real Madrid and Espanyol in the 1930s. He also played one match for the Catalan national team.

He was the brother of fellow footballer Carles Bestit.

== Career ==
Born on 23 January 1910 in Barcelona, Catalonia, Bestit began his football career in his hometown club CE Europa in 1927, aged 17, where he played alongside his older brother Carles, so in order to distinguish them in the press, the local newspapers started referring to them as Bestit I and Bestit II. He played with Europa for four years, from 1927 until 1931, scoring 33 goals in 87 official matches, including 16 goals in 37 La Liga matches, and 17 goals in 50 Catalan championship matches.

In 1930, Bestit was signed by Real Madrid, with whom he played for just a single season, scoring 9 goals in 13 official matches, including 7 goals in 9 Madrid championship matches, and 2 goals in 4 La Liga matches, thus helping his side win two championship titles and one league title in 1931–32. In total, he scored 18 goals in 41 La Liga matches for Europa and Madrid. On the occasion of the inauguration of Estadio Bardín on 18 September 1932, Bestit started for Madrid in a friendly match against Hércules, scoring his side's second to seal a 2–0 win. In 1933, after a long period of inactivity, the white team sold him to Espanyol for 5,000 pesetas, where he scored two goals in 12 official matches, all in the Catalan championship.

Later that year, Bestit signed for the Segunda División team Elche, where he remained for over a decade, from 1933 until 1943, becoming a player-coach in 1941, and a sole coach for the 1942–43 season.

== Death ==
Bestit died in Sant Joan d'Alacant, Alicante, on 3 July 1995, at the age of 85.

== Honours ==
Real Madrid

- Centro Championship:
  - Champions (1): 1931–32 and 1932–33
- La Liga
  - Champions (1): 1931–32
