= Manuel Oro =

Spanish footballer and manager

Personal information
- Full name: Manuel Oro Comas
- Birth name: Manel Oró i Comas
- Date of birth: 3 January 1909
- Place of birth: Barcelona, Catalonia, Spain
- Date of death: 11 May 2002 (aged 93)
- Place of death: Barcelona, Catalonia, Spain
- Position: Defender

Senior career*
Years	Team	Apps	(Gls)
1927–1930	CE Júpiter		
1930–1931	FC Barcelona		
1931–1932	Sabadell FC		
1932–1934	RCD Espanyol		
1934–1936	Real Murcia		
1936	Granollers		
1939–1941	Real Murcia		
1941–1944	Sant Andreu		
1944–1946	CE Mataró		

International career
1933–1937	Catalonia	2	(0)

Managerial career
- 1942–1944: Sant Andreu
- ?: CE Manresa
- * Club domestic league appearances and goals

Manuel Oro Comas (3 January 1909 – 11 May 2002) was a Spanish footballer who played as a defender for FC Barcelona, RCD Espanyol, and Real Murcia.

== Footballing career ==
=== Club career ===
Born on 3 January 1909 in the Barcelona neighborhood of La Sagrera, Oro began his footballing career in the ranks of CE Júpiter, a team from the Barcelona neighborhood of La Verneda, where he played until 1930, year in which was acquired by FC Barcelona. He stayed at Barcelona for only one season, in which he played 23 games, including four competitive matches in the Catalan championship, which Barça won. Faced with the lack of opportunities, the following season he joined Sabadell FC, where he remained until December 1932, when he was signed by RCD Espanyol, where he again had few chances, playing in only three La Liga matches in two seasons.

At the end of 1934, Oro signed for Real Murcia, remaining there for seven years until 1941, sept for a brief stint with Granollers during the Spanish Civil War. Together with José Cabo, José Griera Farreras, and Félix Huete, he was a member of the Murcia squad that won the 1939–40 Segunda División, thus achieving promotion to the first division. During this period, he was sort of a Blaugrana ambassador in Murcia, since he always maintained a very good relationship with Barça and its sports commission, which was mostly made up of "friends" and Pepe Planas, who had also played for Murcia and to whom Oro reported about interesting players in Murcia, such as José Bravo, Luis Miró, Galcerán, and Benito García, who were all successful in Les Corts.

In 1942, Oro returned to Barcelona where he signed for Sant Andreu, where he worked as a player-coach until 1944, when he left the club to join CE Mataró, where he retired in 1946, at the age of 37. In total, he only played seven La Liga matches.

He also coached CE Manresa at some point. On 19 March 1953, Oro was the subject of a tribute match, which took place at the Camp de La Maquinista between La Maquinista and CE Europa (2–0) and Sant Andreu reserve UA Horta reserve (7–1).

=== International career ===
Oro played twice for the Catalan national team, making his debut on 24 June 1933, in a match against his former club Sabadell, being highlighted by the press as one of his side's best players in a 2–4 loss. On 16 May 1937, Oro earned his second and last cap for Catalonia against his former club FC Barcelona, in a match directed to help the Mutual Sports Club and the State's Civil War front, ending in a 4–4 draw.

== Military career ==
During the Civil War, Oro was mobilized by the Republic and, despite not having a driving licence, he spent the entire war driving a Katiuska truck; he never got behind the wheel of a vehicle again.

== Death ==
Oro was the oldest living player in the history of Barcelona at the time of his death in Barcelona on 11 May 2002, at the age of 92. On the following day, Barcelona players wore black armbands in the last matchday of the league season against Real Zaragoza as a sign of mourning.

== Honours ==
FC Barcelona

Catalan championship:

- Champions (1): 1930–31

Real Murcia

Segunda División:

- Champions (1): 1939–40
