= FC Atlético de Sabadell =

Football club in Spain active between 1909 and 1935

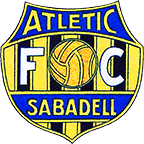
- The club's symbol
- Short name: Athletic FC
- Founded: 1909
- Dissolved: 1935
- League: Catalan championship
Home colours	Away colours

The FC Atlético de Sabadell, or Atlético FC as it was also called at the time, was a football team based in Sabadell, Catalonia, Spain, which existed from 1909 until its dissolution in 1935. The team's uniform was a black and gold shirt and black trousers. The club was presided by Josep Germà for many years.

== History ==
Founded in 1909 by Jaime Rovira, Atlético FC joined the Catalan Football Federation at the end of August 1910 and soon competed in the second tier of the Catalan championship alongside CE Sabadell FC, thus sparkling a football rivalry in the city. In the 1913–14 season, their rivals Sabadell FC won the Second Division title and achieved promotion to the top tier, but Atlético was quick to respond, doing that same feat in the following season, in 1914–15 season. Thus, the two main clubs in Sabadell competed in the top tier for the next few years, until the 1918–19 campaign, when Atlético Sabadell was relegated after finishing last and losing the promotion match to CE Europa 1–4.

The following season ended up being even worse, as Atlético Sabadell finished last in the second tier and again lost the promotion match, this time to Martinenc. Two years later, in the 1921–22 season, Atlético won the third tier championship, thus returning to second.

The club remained in this category for the next eleven seasons, surviving three relegation promotions against Reus Deportiu, Palafrugell and UD Girona, but at the end of the 1932–33 season, Atlético Sabadell was finally relegated to the third tier of Catalan football, where it began to lose momentum and was dissolved in 1935.

== Notable players ==
- Casimiro Mallorquí

== Seasons ==
Season	Championship	Position
1910–11	2nd tier Catalan Championship	?
1911–12	2nd tier Catalan Championship	14º
1912–13	2nd tier Catalan Championship	8º
1913–14	2nd tier Catalan Championship	?
1914–15	2nd tier Catalan Championship	1º
1915–16	Catalan Football Championship	6º
1916–17	Catalan Football Championship	5º
1917–18	Catalan Football Championship	4º
1918–19	Catalan Football Championship	6º
1919–20	2nd tier Catalan Championship	6º
1920–21	3rd tier Catalan Championship	3º
1921–22	3rd tier Catalan Championship	1º
1922–23	2nd tier Catalan Championship	5º
1923–24	2nd tier Catalan Championship	6º
1924–25	2nd tier Catalan Championship	3º
1925–26	2nd tier Catalan Championship	3º
1926–27	2nd tier Catalan Championship	8º
1927–28	2nd tier Catalan Championship	7º
1928–29	2nd tier Catalan Championship	4º of Group 3
1929–30	2nd tier Catalan Championship	4º of Group 2
1930–31	2nd tier Catalan Championship	4º
1931–32	2nd tier Catalan Championship	8º of Group 2
1932–33	2nd tier Catalan Championship	7º of Group 2
1933–34	Does not participate	
1934–35	3rd tier Catalan Championship	6º of Group 1
