= 1931–32 Campionat de Catalunya =

Campionat de Catalunya
- Season: 1931–32
- Champions: Barcelona
- Relegated: Europa
- Matches played: 56
- Goals scored: 224 (4 per match)
- Top goalscorer: Josep Samitier (13 goals)
- Biggest home win: Barcelona 8–0 Palafrugell (27 September 1931)
- Biggest away win: Martinenc 1–7 Espanyol (20 September 1931); Palafrugell 0–6 Júpiter (8 November 1931)
- Highest scoring: Barcelona 8–1 Martinenc (4 October 1931)

The 1931–32 Campionat de Catalunya season was the 33rd since its establishment and was played between 6 September 1931 and 10 February 1932.

== Overview before the season ==
Eight teams joined the Division One league, including two that would play the 1931–32 La Liga, one from the 1931–32 Segunda División and four from the 1931–32 Tercera División.

From La Liga

- Barcelona
- Espanyol

From Segunda División

- Europa

From Tercera División

- Badalona
- Júpiter
- Martinenc
- Sabadell

== Division One ==
=== League table ===
Pos	Team	Pld	W	D	L	GF	GA	GD	Pts	Qualification or relegation
1	Barcelona (C)	14	11	1	2	43	12	+31	23	Qualification for Copa del Rey
2	Espanyol	14	10	0	4	52	17	+35	20	Qualification for Copa del Rey
3	Júpiter	14	8	2	4	33	22	+11	18	Qualification for Copa del Rey
4	Sabadell	14	6	2	6	24	22	+2	14	
5	Badalona	14	5	2	7	17	28	−11	12	
6	Palafrugell (O)	14	3	4	7	13	39	−26	10	Qualification for the play-off league
7	Martinenc (O)	14	4	0	10	25	51	−26	8	Qualification for the play-off league
8	Europa (R)	14	2	3	9	17	33	−16	7	Qualification for the play-off league

Source: BDFútbol
Rules for classification: 1) points; 2) head-to-head points; 3) head-to-head goal difference; 4) goal difference; 5) number of goals scored
(C) Champions; (O) Play-off winners; (R) Relegated

=== Results ===
Home \ Away	BAD	FCB	ESP	EUR	JUP	MAR	PAL	SAB
Badalona	—	1–0	0–2	1–1	3–1	0–3	1–1	2–1
Barcelona	5–0	—	3–2	4–2	3–2	8–1	8–0	0–0
Espanyol	6–1	0–3	—	5–1	4–0	7–0	8–1	1–0
Europa	1–3	1–3	0–5	—	0–3	1–2	1–1	3–1
Júpiter	1–0	2–1	2–1	1–1	—	6–1	1–1	0–2
Martinenc	3–1	1–2	1–7	1–4	3–5	—	6–0	1–5
Palafrugell	0–2	0–1	1–2	1–0	0–6	3–1	—	4–2
Sabadell	3–2	0–2	4–2	2–1	2–3	2–1	0–0	—

Source: BDFútbol
Legend: Blue = home team win; Yellow = draw; Red = away team win.

=== Top goalscorers ===
Goalscorers	Goals	Team
(Spain) Josep Samitier	13	Barcelona
(Spain) Edelmiro Lorenzo	12	Espanyol
(Spain) José Prat	10	Espanyol
(Spain) Pedro Solé	10	Espanyol
(Spain) Huerva	10	Martinenc

== Play-off league ==
Pos	Team	Pld	W	D	L	GF	GA	GD	Pts	Qualification or relegation
1	Sants (C, P)	14	9	1	4	27	19	+8	19	Play-off winners
2	Palafrugell	14	9	1	4	24	21	+3	19	Play-off winners
3	Martinenc	14	7	4	3	38	20	+18	18	Play-off winners
4	Santboià	14	7	3	4	29	22	+7	17	
5	Terrassa	14	5	6	3	35	30	+5	16	
6	Vilafranca	14	4	3	7	22	25	−3	11	
7	Horta	14	2	5	7	23	31	−8	9	
8	Europa	14	0	3	11	12	42	−30	3	

Source: BDFútbol
Rules for classification: 1) points; 2) head-to-head points; 3) head-to-head goal difference; 4) goal difference; 5) number of goals scored
(C) Champions; (P) Promoted

== Division Two ==
=== Group A ===
Pos	Team	Pld	W	D	L	GF	GA	GD	Pts	Qualification or relegation
1	Sants	14	9	2	3	36	11	+25	20	Qualification for the play-off league
2	Santboià	14	7	4	3	30	21	+9	18	Qualification for the play-off league
3	Vilafranca	14	7	3	4	31	22	+9	17	Repechage
4	Sant Andreu	14	8	1	5	30	20	+10	17	
5	Reus	14	7	0	7	22	23	−1	14	
6	Gimnàstic Tarragona	14	5	3	6	20	27	−7	13	
7	Vilanova	14	3	2	9	16	37	−21	8	
8	Güell	14	2	1	11	17	41	−24	5	

Source: BDFútbol
Rules for classification: 1) points; 2) head-to-head points; 3) head-to-head goal difference; 4) goal difference; 5) number of goals scored

=== Group B ===
Pos	Team	Pld	W	D	L	GF	GA	GD	Pts	Qualification or relegation
1	Terrassa	14	8	4	2	28	14	+14	20	Qualification for the play-off league
2	Horta	14	9	2	3	31	17	+14	20	Qualification for the play-off league
3	Granollers	14	8	3	3	28	21	+7	19	Repechage
4	Ripollet	14	6	4	4	30	27	+3	16	
5	Iluro	14	6	4	4	34	21	+13	16	
6	Girona	14	4	2	8	21	29	−8	10	
7	Manresa	14	2	4	8	10	30	−20	8	
8	Atlètic Sabadell	14	0	3	11	9	32	−23	3	

Source: BDFútbol
Rules for classification: 1) points; 2) head-to-head points; 3) head-to-head goal difference; 4) goal difference; 5) number of goals scored

=== Repechage ===
Team 1	Agg.	Team 2	1st leg	2nd leg
Granollers	1–7	Vilafranca	1–2	0–5
