= 1928–29 RCD Espanyol season =

28th season in existence of RCD Espanyol

Espanyol
1928–29 season
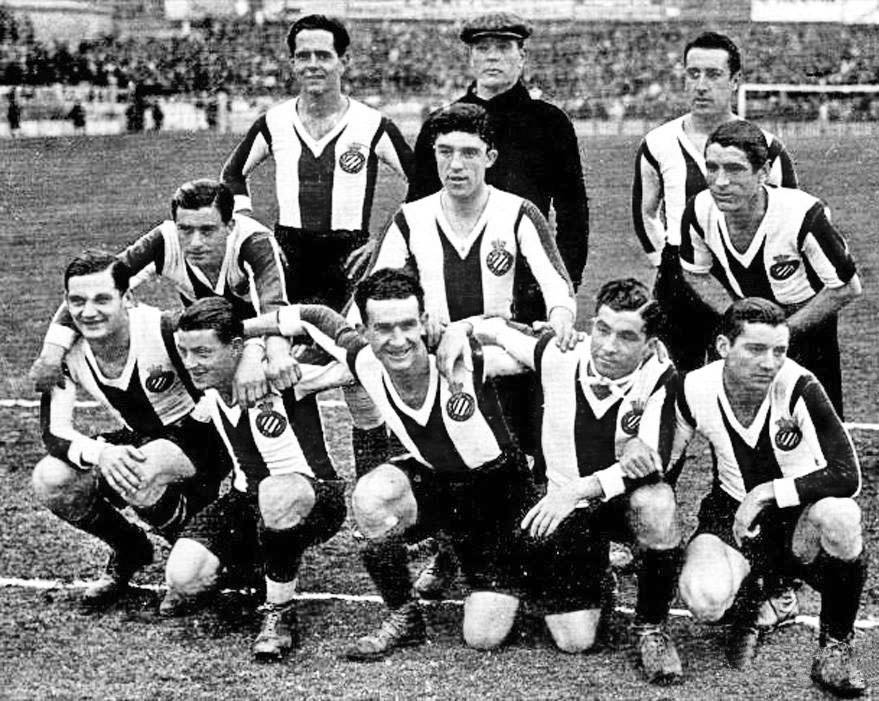
- RCD Espanyol in 1929
- President: Genaro de la Riva
- Manager: Jack Greenwell
- Stadium: Sarrià Stadium
- La Liga: 7th
- Catalan League: Winners
- Copa del Rey: Winners
- Biggest win: Espanyol 4–0 Real Madrid, 24 March 1929
- Biggest defeat: Athletic Bilbao 9–0 Espanyol, 17 February 1929

The 1928–29 season was RCD Espanyol's first season in the Spanish First Division.

It was one of the most successful seasons in the club's history, winning both the 1928–29 Campionat de Catalunya and the 1928–29 Copa del Rey. League matches were played from February to June 1929, and Espanyol finished in 7th position.

== Summary ==
- 25 November 1928: Espanyol walked into the Sarrià Stadium to face city rivals FC Barcelona in the Catalan championship, only needing a victory to mathematically secure the title; Espanyol won 2–1, courtesy of two second-half goals from Francisco Tena and Domingo Broto. The club won the 1928–29 Campionat de Catalunya after winning nine games out of ten, and drawing the other.
- 3 February 1929: Espanyol won the 1929 Copa del Rey final at the Mestalla, having beaten the likes of Sporting de Gijón, Arenas, Atlético Madrid in the quarter-finals, Barcelona in the semifinals, and then Real Madrid in the final (2–1), thanks to two second-half goals from Tena and Crisant Bosch.
- 10 February 1929: Espanyol makes its La Liga debut, beating Real Unión 3–2, thanks to goals from Pitus Prat and Oramas (twice), with the former scoring the first-ever goal in the history of La Liga. This win meant that Espanyol was now unbeaten for 20 consecutive games.

== First-team squad ==
- Onze tipus

Position	Player	La Liga		Copa del Rey		Catalan Championship	
Position	Player	Games played	Goals scored	Games played	Goals scored	Games played	Goals scored
GK	(Catalonia) Ricardo Zamora	15	-24	9	-15	7	-2
GK	(Catalonia) Cristòfol Solà	3	-9	-	-	3	-2
DF	(El Salvador) Ricardo Saprissa	13	-	8	-	7	-
DF	(Spain) Rafael González	12	-	3	-	3	-
DF	(Catalonia) Conrad Portas	-	-	7	-	9	-
DF	(Catalonia) Josep Virgili	5	-	-	-	-	-
DF	(Catalonia) Llorenç Roure	1	-	-	-	-	-
MF	(Catalonia) Ramón Trabal	16	-5	9	-	7	-
MF	(Valencian Community) Juan Tena	16	1	6	-	8	-
MF	(Catalonia) Pedro Solé	11	-	9	1	9	-
MF	(Catalonia) Julio Káiser	8	-	3	-	4	-
MF	(Valencian Community) Carlos Altés	3	-	-	-	1	-
MF	(Catalonia) Ramon Duran	2	-	-	-	1	-
MF	(Catalonia) Ramon Tomàs	2	-	-	-	-	-
FW	(Catalonia) Martí Ventolrà	15	6	8	4	8	4
FW	(Spain) José Padrón	14	2	8	9	8	4
FW	(Valencian Community) Francisco Tena	12	4	9	10	8	8
FW	(Catalonia) Domingo Broto	8	4	8	6	7	9
FW	(Catalonia) Crisant Bosch	5	-	8	2	8	1
FW	(Catalonia) Gabriel Juvé	12	2	1	-	2	3
FW	(Catalonia) Ricardo Gallart	10	5	2	-	2	-
FW	(Spain) Rafael Oramas	8	6	-	-	3	-
FW	(Catalonia) Pitus Prat	6	1	1	-	2	1
FW	(Catalonia) Manuel Estrada	-	-	-	-	2	2
FW	(Spain) Enrique Vilar	-	-	-	-	1	-
FW	(Spain) Jesús Navarro	-	-	-	-	-	-

== Competitions ==
=== La Liga ===
==== League table ====
Pos	Team	Pld	W	D	L	GF	GA	GD	Pts
5	Arenas	18	8	3	7	33	43	−10	19
6	Athletic Madrid	18	8	2	8	43	41	+2	18 (Note: Athletic Madrid finished ahead of Español on head-to-head goal difference: Athletic Madrid–Español 7–1, Español–Athletic Madrid 3–2)
7	Español	18	7	4	7	32	38	−6	18
8	Europa	18	6	4	8	45	49	−4	16
9	Real Unión	18	5	2	11	40	42	−2	12

Source: BDFútbol
Rules for classification: 1) points; 2) head-to-head points; 3) head-to-head goal difference; 4) goal difference; 5) number of goals scored.

==== Matches ====
10 February 1929 1	Espanyol	3–2	Real Unión	Barcelona
	Prat 5'; Oramas 60', 76'	Report	Regueiro 52', 57'	Stadium: Sarrià Stadium; Referee: Pedro Escartín
Note: Prat scored the first-ever goal in La Liga's history.

17 February 1929 2	Athletic Bilbao	9–0	Espanyol	Bilbao
	Carmelo 18', 32', 70'; Lafuente 39', 58', 81' (pen.); Calero 49', 86'; Unamuno 75'	Report		Stadium: San Mamés; Referee: Pedro Escartín

24 February 1929 3	Espanyol	3–1	Europa	Barcelona
	Broto 3'; Tena II 12'; Padrón 27'	Report	Gámiz 87'	Stadium: Sarrià Stadium; Referee: José Llovera

3 March 1929 4	Espanyol	3–0	Racing de Santander	Barcelona
	Oramas 42', 78'; Ventolrà 65'	Report		Stadium: Sarrià Stadium; Referee: Pedro Escartín

10 March 1929 5	Real Sociedad	1–1	Espanyol	San Sebastián
	Cholín 57'	Report	60' Broto	Stadium: Atotxa; Referee: José María Navaz

24 March 1929 6	Espanyol	4–0	Real Madrid	Barcelona
	Tena I 18'; Broto 40'; Oramas 46', 75'	Report		Stadium: Sarrià Stadium; Referee: José María Steimborn

31 March 1929 7	Espanyol	1–2	Arenas	Barcelona
	Zarraonandia 57' (o.g.)	Report	Gurruchaga 82'; Yermo 85'	Stadium: Sarrià Stadium; Referee: Antonio Adrados

7 April 1929 8	Barcelona	1–0	Espanyol	Barcelona
	Sastre 80'	Report		Stadium: Les Corts; Referee: Pedro Escartín

21 April 1929 9	Espanyol	3–2	Athletic de Madrid	Barcelona
	Tena II 5'; Padrón 25'; Ventolrà 70'	Report	Vázquez II 17'; Cosme 65'	Stadium: Sarrià Stadium; Referee: Guillermo Comorera

28 April 1929 10	Real Unión	4–3	Espanyol	Irun
	Garmendia 29'; Echeveste 30'; Regueiro 33'; Urtizberea 34'	Report	Tena II 80'; Broto 89'; Ventolrà 90'	Stadium: Gal; Referee: Pedro Escartín

5 May 1929 11	Espanyol	4–1	Athletic Bilbao	Barcelona
	Gallart 25', 46', 88'; Ventolrà 72'	Report	Lafuente 29'	Stadium: Sarrià Stadium; Referee: Ramón Melcón

9 May 1929 12	Europa	0–3	Espanyol	Barcelona
		Report	Ventolrà 65', 78'; Tena II 84'	Stadium: Camp del Guinardó; Referee: Guillermo Comorera

26 May 1929 14	Espanyol	1–1	Real Sociedad	Barcelona
	Gallart 76'	Report	12' Bienzobas	Stadium: Sarrià Stadium; Referee: Ramón Melcón

30 May 1929 13	Racing de Santander	1–1	Espanyol	Santander
	Óscar 49'	Report	Juvé 13'	Stadium: El Sardinero; Referee: José María Steimborn

2 June 1929 15	Real Madrid	2–0	Espanyol	Madrid
	Rubio 30'; Triana 44'	Report		Stadium: Chamartín; Referee: Alejandro Quintana

9 June 1929 16	Arenas	3–0	Espanyol	Getxo
	Menchaca 5'; Virgili 20' (o.g.); Yermo 34'	Report		Stadium: Campo de Ibaiondo; Referee: Ramón Melcón

16 June 1929 17	Español	1–1	Barcelona	Barcelona
	Juvé 48'	Report	Sastre 78'	Stadium: Montjuic; Referee: Pedro Escartín

23 June 1929 18	Athletic Madrid	7–1	Espanyol	Madrid
	Marín 29', 43', 51'; Ordóñez 48'; Vázquez II 60'; Areta 71'; Cosme 73'	Report	Gallart 39'	Stadium: Metropolitano; Referee: Luis González Romera

=== Copa del Rey ===
==== Round of 32 ====
9 December 1928 First leg	Sporting de Gijón	3–4	Espanyol	Gijón
	Ordieres 44' (pen.); Quirós 87'; Bosch 89' (o.g.)	Report	Tena II 20', 24'; Ventolrà 53'; Padrón 81'	Stadium: El Molinón; Referee: José María Navaz

16 December 1928 Second leg	Sporting de Gijón	5–2	Espanyol	Barcelona
	Cuesta 7' (o.g.); Gallart 24'; Solé 60'; Tena II 70'; Broto 73'	Report	Campanal I 13', 82'	Stadium: Sarrià Stadium; Referee: Tomás Balaguer

==== Round of 16 ====
23 December 1928 First leg	Arenas	4–6	Espanyol	Getxo
	Yermo 1', 34'; Rivero 33'; Anduiza 48'	Report	Padrón 3', 81'; Broto 6', 15'; Bosch 53'; Ventolrà 73'	Stadium: Campo de Ibaiondo; Referee: Pedro Escartín

30 December 1928 Second leg	Arenas	3–1	Espanyol	Barcelona
	Padrón 30', 40'; Ventolrà 77'	Report	Yermo 88'	Stadium: Sarrià Stadium; Referee: Ramón Melcón

==== Quarterfinals ====
6 January 1929 First leg	Athletic Madrid	5–1	Espanyol	Barcelona
	Tena II 20', 74', 85'; Padrón 27'; Broto 69'	Report	Olaso 88'	Stadium: Sarrià Stadium; Referee: Pelayo Serrano

13 January 1929 Second leg	Athletic Madrid	2–4	Espanyol	Madrid
	Lecube 20'; Areta 88'	[https://www.bdfutbol.com/en/p/p.php?id=517380 Report	Padrón 40', 70'; Tena II 57', 71'	Stadium: Metropolitano; Referee: Pedro Vallana

==== Semifinals ====
20 January 1929 First leg	Espanyol	2–0	Barcelona	Barcelona
	Broto 6'; Ventolrà 71'	Report	Barcelona	Stadium: Montjuic; Referee: Ramón Melcón

27 January 1929 Second leg	Barcelona	1–1	Espanyol	Barcelona
	Padrón 42'	Report	Saprissa 15' (o.g.)	Stadium: Les Corts; Referee: Ramón Melcón

==== Final ====
3 February 1929 Final	RCD Espanyol	2–1	Real Madrid	Valencia
15:00 CET	Tena II 55'; Bosch 70'	Report1; Report2	Lazcano 75'	Stadium: Mestalla; Attendance: 25,000; Referee: Pelayo Serrano

=== Catalan football championship ===
==== League table ====
Pos	Team	Pld	W	D	L	GF	GA	GD	Pts
1	Espanyol	10	9	1	0	32	4	+28	19
2	Europa	10	4	5	1	23	8	+15	13
3	Barcelona	10	5	2	3	23	13	+10	12

==== Matches ====
30 September 1928 1	Terrassa	0–3	RCD Espanyol	Terrassa
		Report	Tena II 21', 24'; Juvé 66'	Referee: José Llovera

7 October 1928 2	RCD Espanyol	0–0	Europa	Barcelona
		Report	Mur; Ispizua; Calvo; Loredo; Urreaga	Stadium: Sarrià Stadium; Referee: Agustín Cruella

14 October 1928 3	Sabadell	1–4	RCD Espanyol	Sabadell
	Sancho 80'	Report	Broto 1'; Ventolrà 8', 75'; Estrada 31'	Stadium: Creu Alta; Referee: Ángel Castarlenas

21 October 1928 4	Barcelona	0–2	Español	Barcelona
		Report	Broto 40'; Padrón 45'	Stadium: Les Corts; Referee: Ramón Melcón

28 October 1928 5	RCD Espanyol	5–1	Sants	Barcelona
	Ventolrà 10', 20'; Broto 30'; Tena II 40', 45'	Report	García (45)	Stadium: Sarrià Stadium; Referee: Guillermo Comorera

4 November 1928 6	RCD Espanyol	7–0	Terrassa	Barcelona
	Tena II 24', 25', 68'; Bosch 26'; Padrón 34'; Broto 55', 78'	Report		Stadium: Sarrià Stadium; Referee: Ángel Castarlenas

11 November 1928 7	Europa	0–1	RCD Espanyol	Barcelona
	Broto 45'	Report		Stadium: Camp del Guinardó; Referee: Guillermo Comorera

18 November 1928 8	RCD Espanyol	5–0	Sabadell	Barcelona
	Broto 51', 54'; Padrón 65', 75'; Prat 68'	Report		Stadium: Sarrià Stadium; Referee: Ángel Castarlenas

25 November 1928 9	Espanyol	2–1	Barcelona	Barcelona
	Tena II 65'; Broto 75'	Report	Samitier 45'	Stadium: Sarrià Stadium; Referee: Ramón Melcón

2 December 1928 10	Sants	1–3	RCD Espanyol	Barcelona
	Calvet 85'	Report	Juvé 12', 75'; Estrada 80'	Referee: Jaime Villena
