= List of Catalan footballers =

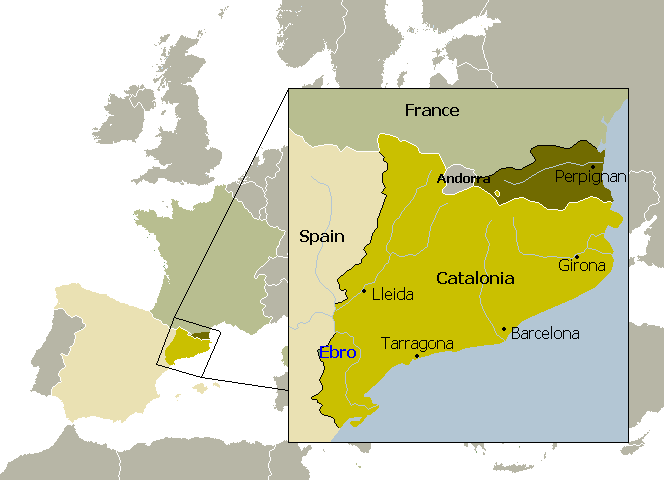
Location of Catalonia, which has produced many players for the Spain national team, and others

The list of Catalan footballers features male association football players from Catalonia, one of Spain's seventeen autonomous communities and a territory with a population of over 7 million, plus the adjoining Pyrénées-Orientales, a French department, and also the Sardinian city of Alghero. All of them have reached international status with the national teams as specified, the vast majority representing Spain.

The region has a representative squad – the Catalonia national football team – but they are not recognised by FIFA, were inactive for long periods and only play friendly matches against FIFA teams or against other sides with similar status such as the Basque Country.

== Catalonia national team players (since 1997) ==
Listed below are the players who have featured for the Catalonia international team dating from 1997 when regular fixtures against FIFA national teams were arranged. As of May 2019, there have been 25 matches played in this era (including four against the Basque Country who have the same unofficial status as Catalonia and select their squads on the same basis), with 141 players involved.

	Key
*	Still active for the national team (Note: Players who are still active for the national team are players who have not retired from football (although they may have retired from their FIFA international team) and are thus eligible to be called up.)
=	Player is tied for the number of caps
GK	Goalkeeper
DF	Defender
MF	Midfielder
FW	Forward

Catalonia national team players since 1997
#	Name	Position	First cap (Note: Catalonia score given first in all cases.)	Last cap	Caps	Goals
1	Sergio García*	FW	2002 (Note: 2–0 vs China, 2002)	2019 (Note: 2–1 vs Venezuela, 2019)	16	9
2	Sergio	MF	1999 (Note: 1–0 vs FR Yugoslavia, 1999)	2013 (Note: 1–1 vs Nigeria, 2013)	15	2
3	Roger	MF	1997 (Note: 1–1 vs Bulgaria, 1997)	2006 (Note: 2–2 vs Basque Country, 2006)	12	2
=	Xavi*	MF	1998 (Note: 5–0 vs Nigeria, 1998)	2016 (Note: 3–3 vs Tunisia, 2016)	12	2
=	Víctor Valdés	GK	2001 (Note: 1–0 vs Chile, 2001)	2011 (Note: 0–0 vs Tunisia, 2011)	12	0
6	Joan Verdú*	FW	2006 (Note: 2–0 vs Costa Rica, 2006)	2016	11	3
7	Quique Álvarez	DF	1997	2004 (Note: 0–3 vs Argentina, 2004)	10	0
=	Joan Capdevila	DF	2002	2013 (Note: 4–1 vs Cape Verde, 2013)	10	0
=	Gerard Piqué*	DF	2004	2019	10	0
10	Albert Celades	MF	1997	2005 (Note: 1–1 vs Paraguay, 2005)	9	1
=	Alberto Lopo	DF	2001	2008 (Note: 2–1 vs Colombia, 2008)	9	0
=	Ferran Corominas	MF	2003 (Note: 4–2 vs Ecuador, 2003)	2011	9	1
13	Jordi Cruyff	FW	1997	2004 (Note: 2–5 vs Brazil, 2004)	8	1
=	Toni	GK	1997	2004	8	0
=	Gerard	MF	1997	2008 (Note: 0–1 vs Argentina, 2008)	8	2
=	Pep Guardiola	MF	1998	2005	8	0
=	Bojan*	FW	2007 (Note: 1–1 vs Basque Country, 2007)	2019	8	7
=	Sergio Busquets*	MF	2008	2015 (Note: 0–1 vs Basque Country, 2015)	8	0
19	Curro Torres	DF	2001	2006	7	0
=	Óscar Serrano	MF	2004	2010 (Note: 4–0 vs Honduras, 2010)	7	0
21	Sergi	DF	1997	2004	6	0
=	Dani García	FW	1997	2002	6	1
=	Carles Puyol	DF	2001	2013	6	0
=	Piti*	FW	2003	2015	6	1
=	David García	DF	2004	2010	6	0
=	Oleguer	DF	2004	2009 (Note: 4–2 vs Argentina, 2009)	6	0
=	Jonathan Soriano*	FW	2004	2014 (Note: 1–1 vs Basque Country, 2014)	6	1
=	Álvaro Vázquez*	FW	2010	2016	6	0
=	Marc Bartra*	DF	2010	2019	6	0
=	Sergi Roberto*	DF	2011	2016	6	0
=	Martín Montoya*	DF	2011	2019	6	0
32	Antonio Pinilla	FW	1997	2007	5	0
=	Óscar	FW	1998	2002 (Note: 1–3 vs Brazil, 2002)	5	5
=	Gabri	MF	1999	2006	5	0
=	Jordi Codina	GK	2001	2013	5	0
=	Luis García	FW	2001	2008	5	3
=	José Miguel Morales	GK	2001	2008	5	0
=	Bruno*	DF	2005	2009	5	0
=	David Belenguer	DF	2006	2008	5	0
=	Jordi Alba*	DF	2008	2015	5	0
=	Kiko Casilla*	GK	2010	2015	5	0
42	Francesc Arnau	GK	1997	2002	4	0
=	Xavi Aguado	DF	1998	2001	4	0
=	Raúl Tamudo	FW	1998	2002	4	1
=	Damià	DF	2004	2010	4	0
=	Alberto de la Bella*	DF	2010	2016	4	0
=	Andreu Fontàs*	DF	2010	2016	4	0
=	Víctor Sánchez*	MF	2013	2019	4	0
=	Aleix Vidal*	DF	2013	2019	4	0
=	Víctor Álvarez*	DF	2013	2016	4	0
51	Toni Soldevilla	DF	2000 (Note: 5–0 vs Lithuania, 2000)	2002	3	0
=	Albert Luque	FW	2002	2006	3	2
=	Cesc Fàbregas*	MF	2004	2013	3	0
=	Albert Jorquera	GK	2006	2007	3	0
=	Marc Crosas	MF	2007	2016	3	0
=	Carlos García	DF	2007	2008	3	0
=	Fernando Navarro	DF	2006	2009	3	0
=	Dídac Vilà*	DF	2011	2019	3	0
=	Jordi Masip*	GK	2014	2016	3	0
=	Gerard Moreno*	FW	2014	2016	3	1
61=	Miquel Soler	DF	1997	1998	2	0
=	Óscar Serrano	MF	1997	1998	2	0
=	Lluís Carreras	DF	1997	1998	2	0
=	Cristóbal Parralo	DF	1998	1999	2	0
=	Albert Tomàs	DF	1998	1999	2	0
=	Delfí Geli	DF	2000	2002	2	0
=	Dani Tortolero	DF	2002	2007	2	0
=	Alex Fernández (es)	MF	2002	2002	2	0
=	Albert Crusat	MF	2002	2008	2	0
=	Ángel Morales	MF	2002	2004	2	0
=	Monty (es)	MF	2002	2002	2	0
=	Miguel Ángel	MF	2002	2004	2	0
=	Jofre	MF	2004	2004	2	0
=	Jordi López	MF	2005	2006	2	0
=	Javi Chica*	DF	2007	2008	2	0
=	Ángel Martínez	MF	2007	2008	2	0
=	Javi Márquez*	MF	2010	2015	2	0
=	Marc Muniesa*	DF	2011	2019	2	0
=	Jordi Amat*	DF	2011	2013	2	0
=	Cristian Tello*	FW	2013	2013	2	0
=	David López*	MF	2013	2015	2	0
=	Oriol Riera	FW	2013	2016	2	1
=	Sergi Samper*	MF	2014	2016	2	0
=	Víctor Rodríguez*	MF	2015	2016	2	0
=	Joan Jordán*	FW	2015	2019	2	0
=	Édgar Badía*	GK	2016	2022	3	0
=	Pere Pons*	MF	2016	2019	2	0
87	Jaime	DF	1997		1	0
=	Alejo (es)	DF	1997		1	0
=	Toni Velamazán	MF	1997		1	0
=	Joan Barbarà	FW	1998		1	1
=	Gerard Escoda (es)	FW	1998		1	0
=	Enrique de Lucas	MF	1999		1	0
=	Rubén Navarro	FW	2000		1	0
=	Pepe Reina (Note: Pepe Reina and Andrés Iniesta are the only players to have featured for Catalonia since 1997 who would not have definitely qualified to do so under standard FIFA eligibility criteria (other than the rule on being 'cap-tied' to another national team, which does not apply), although at the time of their respective selections both had lengthy associations with the region playing for the youth teams of FC Barcelona.)	GK	2000		1	0
=	Raül Capó	DF	2003		1	0
=	Aarón Bueno*	MF	2003		1	0
=	Andrés Iniesta	MF	2004		1	0
=	Ramón de Quintana	DF	2005		1	0
=	Marc Sellarés	FW	2005		1	0
=	Oriol	DF	2006		1	0
=	Jordi Martínez (ca)	MF	2006		1	0
=	Uri	FW	2006		1	0
=	Sergio Sánchez*	DF	2006		1	0
=	Dani Jarque	DF	2006		1	0
=	Jordi Tarrés	FW	2006		1	0
=	Abraham*	MF	2006		1	0
=	Josep Maria Soler (nl) (Note: Soler, an amateur player with CE Manresa, was called up to the squad at late notice having performed well in the Spanish stage of the UEFA Regions' Cup.)	FW	2007		1	0
=	Cristian*	MF	2008		1	0
=	Santi Triguero	FW	2008		1	0
=	Jordi Matamala	MF	2008		1	0
=	Moisés Hurtado	MF	2009		1	1
=	Víctor Ruiz*	DF	2010		1	0
=	Rafa Jordà*	FW	2010		1	0
=	Sergio Juste*	DF	2011		1	0
=	Raúl Rodríguez*	DF	2011		1	0
=	Isaac Cuenca*	MF	2011		1	0
=	Albert Puigdollers	MF	2011		1	0
=	Sergio Tejera*	MF	2013		1	0
=	Marc Valiente*	DF	2013		1	0
=	Oriol Rosell*	MF	2013		1	0
=	Jordi Xumetra*	MF	2013		1	0
=	Gerard Deulofeu*	FW	2014	2022	2	3
=	Pau López*	GK	2015		1	0
=	Keita*	FW	2015	2025	2	0
=	Pol Lirola*	DF	2016		1	0
=	Gerard Valentín*	DF	2016		1	0
=	Sergi Gómez*	DF	2016		1	0
=	Aarón Martín*	DF	2016		1	0
=	Marc Roca*	MF	2016		1	0
=	Álex Granell*	MF	2019		1	0
=	Óscar Melendo*	MF	2019		1	0
=	Isaac Becerra*	GK	2019		1	0
=	Marc Cardona*	FW	2019		1	0
=	Marc Cucurella*	DF	2019		1	0
=	Oriol Romeu*	MF	2019		1	0
=	Javi Puado*	FW	2019		1	1
=	Aleix García*	MF	2019		1	0
=	Pere Milla*	MF	2019		1	0
=	Riqui Puig*	MF	2019		1	0

== FIFA international players from Catalonia ==
All of the players listed were either born or raised in Catalonia, with most meeting both criteria.

- Players in **bold** have won the FIFA World Cup
- Players in underlined have won a continental championships
- Players in italics have won the gold medal at the Olympic Games

As of 16 October 2024

Player	Province	Nation	Caps	From	To	Finals	Catalonia
Iván Balliu	Girona	Albania	14	2017	Active	N/A	No
Albert Alavedra	Barcelona	Andorra	28	2020	2023	N/A	No
Víctor Bernat	Barcelona	Andorra	21	2021	Active	N/A	No
Joaquim Besora	Tarragona	Andorra	1	2011	2011	N/A	No
Antoni Lima	Barcelona	Andorra	64	1997	2009	N/A	**Yes**
Ildefons Lima	Barcelona	Andorra	129	1997	Active	N/A	No
Daniel Mejías	Barcelona	Andorra	5	2010	Active	N/A	No
Pablo Maffeo	Barcelona	Argentina	0	2026	Active	N/A	No
Steve Mounié	Roussillon	Benin	48	2015	Active	N/A	No
Jaume Cuéllar	Barcelona	Bolivia	10	2021	Active	N/A	No
Omar de la Cruz	Barcelona	Dominican Republic	0	2024	Active	1	No
Mariano Díaz	Barcelona	Dominican Republic	1	2013	Active	N/A	No
Cristo Espuny	Tarragona	Dominican Republic	2	2018	Active	N/A	No
Carlos Heredia	Barcelona	Dominican Republic	11	2018	Active	N/A	No
Brian López	Barcelona	Dominican Republic	10	2021	Active	N/A	No
Carlos Julio Martínez	Barcelona	Dominican Republic	18	2012	Active	N/A	No
Edgar Pujol	Barcelona	Dominican Republic	0	2024	Active	1	No
Oscar Ureña	Girona	Dominican Republic	0	2024	Active	1	No
Diego Almeida	Barcelona	Ecuador	1	2021	Active	N/A	No
Alberto Edjogo-Owono	Barcelona	Equatorial Guinea	5	2003	2012	N/A	No
Juvenal Edjogo Owono	Barcelona	Equatorial Guinea	39	2003	2015	2 (Note: 2012 Africa Cup of Nations) (Note: 2015 Africa Cup of Nations)	No
Aitor Embela	Girona	Equatorial Guinea	2	2015	Active	1	No
Anselmo Eyegue	Barcelona	Equatorial Guinea	4	2008	2010	N/A	No
Joanet Eló	Lleida	Equatorial Guinea	7	2021	Active	N/A	No
Juan Epitié	Barcelona	Equatorial Guinea	12	2003	2008	N/A	No
Rubén Epitié	Barcelona	Equatorial Guinea	2	2009	2012	N/A	No
Jordan Gutiérrez	Barcelona	Equatorial Guinea	6	2017	Active	N/A	No
[[Joanet {{{last}}}]]	Lleida	Equatorial Guinea	9	2021	Active	N/A	No
Niko Kata	Barcelona	Equatorial Guinea	13	2016	Active	N/A	No
Baruc Nsue	Barcelona	Equatorial Guinea	1	2013	Active	N/A	No
Iban Salvador	Barcelona	Equatorial Guinea	22	2015	Active	1	No
Pascal Baills	Roussillon	France	1	1991	1991	N/A	No
Laurent Henric	Roussillon	France	4	1928	1929	1 (Note: 1928 Olympic Games)	No
René Llense	Roussillon	France	11	1935	1939	2 (Note: 1934 FIFA World Cup) (Note: 1938 FIFA World Cup)	No
Bacari	Barcelona	Gambia	1	2016	Active	N/A	No
Nuha	Girona	Gambia	4	2019	Active	N/A	No
Aymen Mouelhi	Barcelona	Gibraltar	16	2018	Active	N/A	No
José Kanté	Barcelona	Guinea	13	2016	Active	1 (Note: 2019 Africa Cup of Nations)	No
Ilaix Moriba	Barcelona	Guinea	25	2022	3 (Note: 2021 Africa Cup of Nations) (Note: 2023 Africa Cup of Nations) (Note: 2024 Olympic Games)	No	
Marcelo	Barcelona	Guinea-Bissau	1	2019	Active	1	No
Fernando Recio	Barcelona	Hong Kong	4	2017	Active	N/A	No
Jordi Tarrés	Barcelona	Hong Kong	5	2017	2018	N/A	**Yes**
Jordi Amat	Barcelona	Indonesia	1	2022	Active	1 (Note: 2022 AFF Championship)	No
Antonello Cuccureddu	Alghero	Italy	13	1975	1978	1 (Note: 1978 FIFA World Cup)	No
Tha'er Bawab	Barcelona	Jordan	26	2005	2017	N/A	No
Almike N'Diaye	Barcelona	Mauritania	17	2020	Active	N/A	No
Omar El Hilali	Barcelona	Morocco	1	2026	Active	N/A	No
Moha	Barcelona	Morocco	33	2003	2007	2 (Note: 2004 African Cup of Nations) (Note: 2006 African Cup of Nations)	No
Ismael Saibari	Barcelona	Morocco	27	2023	Active	N/A	No
Jordi Cruyff	Barcelona	Netherlands	9	1996	1996	1 (Note: UEFA Euro 1996)	**Yes**
Eulogio Martínez	Barcelona	Paraguay; Spain	9; 8	1954; 1959	1955; 1962	1; 1	**Yes**
Roberto Martínez	Barcelona	Spain	5	1973	1974	N/A	No
Paulino Alcántara	Barcelona	Philippines; Spain	2; 5	1917; 1921	1917; 1923	N/A	**Yes**
Keita	Girona	Senegal	33	2016	Active	3 (Note: 2017 Africa Cup of Nations) (Note: 2018 FIFA World Cup)	**Yes**
Bambo	Barcelona	Senegal	0	2026	Active	N/A	No
Sergej Milinkovic-Savic	Lleida	Serbia	22	2017	Active	1	No
Alfi Conteh	Barcelona	Sierra Leone	1	2008	2008	N/A	No
Jordi Alba	Barcelona	Spain	72	2011	2023	8 (Note: UEFA Euro 2012) (Note: 2012 Olympic Games) (Note: 2013 FIFA Confederations Cup) (Note: 2014 FIFA World Cup) (Note: UEFA Euro 2016) (Note: UEFA Euro 2020 (played in 2021)) (Note: 2022 FIFA World Cup)	**Yes**
Antonio Alcázar (es)	Barcelona	Spain	2	1925	1925	N/A	**Yes**
Ramón Alfonseda	Barcelona	Spain	0 (Note: No full caps; Olympic Games selection only)	N/A	N/A	1 (Note: 1968 Olympic Games)	No
Fernando Argila (es)	Barcelona	Spain	1	1954	1954	N/A	**Yes**
Josep Artigas (es)	Barcelona	Spain	1	1949	1949	N/A	**Yes**
Alejandro Balde	Barcelona	Spain	7	2022	Active	1	**Yes**
Sergi Barjuán	Barcelona	Spain	56	1994	2002	4 (Note: 1994 FIFA World Cup) (Note: 1998 FIFA World Cup) (Note: UEFA Euro 2000)	**Yes**
Marc Bartra	Tarragona	Spain	14	2013	Active	1	**Yes**
Estanislau Basora	Barcelona	Spain	22	1948	1958	1 (Note: 1950 FIFA World Cup)	**Yes**
Héctor Bellerín	Barcelona	Spain	4	2016	Active	1	No
Gustau Biosca	Barcelona	Spain	11	1951	1954	N/A	**Yes**
Andreu Bosch (es)	Barcelona	Spain	6	1953	1955	N/A	**Yes**
Crisant Bosch	Barcelona	Spain	8	1929	1934	1	**Yes**
**Sergio Busquets**	Barcelona	Spain	123	2009	2022	9 (Note: 2009 FIFA Confederations Cup) (Note: 2010 FIFA World Cup)	**Yes**
Ramón Calderé	Tarragona	Spain	18	1985	1988	2 (Note: 1986 FIFA World Cup) (Note: UEFA Euro 1988)	No
Francisco Calvet	Barcelona	Spain	2	1951	1951	N/A	**Yes**
Canito	Lleida	Spain	1	1978	1978	N/A	No
**Joan Capdevila**	Lleida	Spain	60	2002	2011	5 (Note: 2000 Olympic Games) (Note: UEFA Euro 2004) (Note: UEFA Euro 2008)	**Yes**
Lobo Carrasco	Tarragona	Spain	35	1979	1988	3 (Note: UEFA Euro 1980) (Note: UEFA Euro 1984)	No
Domingo Carulla (es)	Barcelona	Spain	1. (Note: Includes 1 match not counted by some sources: See Spain national football team results (1920–29)#Unofficial match)	1927	1927	1 (Note: 1924 Olympic Games)	**Yes**
Kiko Casilla	Tarragona	Spain	1	2014	Active	N/A	**Yes**
José Carlos Castillo (es)	Lleida	Spain	1	1931	1931	N/A	**Yes**
Albert Celades	Barcelona	Spain	4	1998	2000	1	**Yes**
Paco Clos	Barcelona	Spain	3	1985	1985	N/A	No
Pau Cubarsí	Girona	Spain	4	2024	Active	N/A	No
Marc Cucurella	Barcelona	Spain	12	2021	Active	2 (Note: 2020 Olympic Games (played in 2021)) (Note: UEFA Euro 2024)	**Yes**
Curta	Girona	Spain	3	1947	1948	N/A	**Yes**
Gerard Deulofeu	Girona	Spain	4	2014	2017	N/A	**Yes**
Ernesto Domínguez	Tarragona	Spain	1	1963	1963	N/A	**Yes**
Eladio	Barcelona	Spain	10	1966	1970	1 (Note: 1966 FIFA World Cup)	**Yes**
Vicente Engonga	Barcelona	Spain	14	1998	2000	1	No
Josep Escolà	Barcelona	Spain	2	1941	1945	N/A	**Yes**
Juan José Estella (es)	Barcelona	Spain	1	1982	1982	N/A	No
**Cesc Fàbregas**	Barcelona	Spain	110	2006	2016	8 (Note: 2006 FIFA World Cup)	**Yes**
Ansu Fati	Barcelona	Spain	10	2020	Active	1	**Yes**
Albert Ferrer	Barcelona	Spain	36	1991	1999	3 (Note: 1992 Olympic Games)	**Yes**
Jordi Ferrón	Barcelona	Spain	0	N/A	N/A	1	No
Andreu Fontàs	Girona	Spain	0 (Note: No full caps; Mediterranean Games squad only.)	N/A	Active	1 (Note: 2009 Mediterranean Games)	**Yes**
Paco Fortes	Barcelona	Spain	1	1975	1975	N/A	No
Roberto Fresnedoso	Girona	Spain	0	N/A	N/A	1 (Note: 1996 Olympic Games)	No
Josep Maria Fusté	Lleida	Spain	8	1964	1969	2 (Note: 1964 European Nations' Cup)	No
Gabri	Barcelona	Spain	3	2003	2004	2	**Yes**
Ricardo Gallart (es)	Barcelona	Spain	0 (Note: Only played in 1 unofficial wartime international in 1937: See Spain national football team results (1930–39)#Unofficial matches.)	1937	1937	N/A	**Yes**
Aleix García	Tarragona	Spain	4	2023	Active	N/A	**Yes**
Carlos García	Barcelona	Spain	0	N/A	N/A	1 (Note: 2005 Mediterranean Games)	**Yes**
Dani García	Barcelona	Spain	5	1998	2000	1	**Yes**
Eric García	Barcelona	Spain	19	2020	Active	2	No
Luis García	Barcelona	Spain	20	2005	2008	1	**Yes**
Óscar García	Barcelona	Spain	0	N/A	N/A	1	**Yes**
Salva García	Barcelona	Spain	6	1983	1984	1	No
Sergio García	Barcelona	Spain	2	2008	2008	1	**Yes**
Juan Antonio García Soriano (es)	Barcelona	Spain	2	1974	1974	N/A	**Yes**
Miquel Garrobé (ca)	Barcelona	Spain	1	1927	1927	N/A	**Yes**
Delfí Geli	Girona	Spain	4	1992	1993	N/A	**Yes**
Enric Gensana	Lleida	Spain	10	1957	1961	N/A	No
Bryan Gil	Barcelona	Spain	4	2021	Active	1	No
Sergio Gómez	Barcelona	Spain	1	2024	Active	No	No
José Gonzalvo	Barcelona	Spain	8	1948	1950	1	**Yes**
Mariano Gonzalvo	Barcelona	Spain	16	1946	1954	1	**Yes**
Sígfrid Gràcia	Barcelona	Spain	10	1959	1962	1 (Note: 1962 FIFA World Cup)	**Yes**
Pep Guardiola	Barcelona	Spain	47	1992	2001	3	**Yes**
Ramón Guzmán	Barcelona	Spain	3	1930	1930	N/A	**Yes**
**Xavi Hernández**	Barcelona	Spain	133	2000	2014	10 (Note: 2002 FIFA World Cup)	**Yes**
Juan Carlos Heredia	Barcelona	Spain	3	1978	1979	N/A	No
Toni Jiménez	Barcelona	Spain	3	1998	1999	1	**Yes**
José Juncosa	Lleida	Spain	2	1948	1950	1	**Yes**
Bojan Krkic	Lleida	Spain	1	2008	Active	N/A	**Yes**
Jordi Lardín	Barcelona	Spain	3	1997	1998	1	No
Gerard López	Barcelona	Spain	6	2000	2000	1	**Yes**
Pau López	Girona	Spain	2	2018	Active	N/A	**Yes**
Albert Luque	Barcelona	Spain	17	2002	2005	3	**Yes**
Eduardo Manchón	Barcelona	Spain	1	1954	1954	N/A	**Yes**
Xisco Marcet (es)	Barcelona	Spain	3	1951	1953	N/A	**Yes**
Cristóbal Martí	Barcelona	Spain	3	1930	1931	N/A	**Yes**
José Antonio Martín Domínguez	Barcelona	Spain	3	1991	1991	N/A	**Yes**
Miki Martínez	Barcelona	Spain	0	N/A	N/A	1	No
Óscar Mingueza	Barcelona	Spain	1	2021	Active	1	No
Miquel Mir (es)	Barcelona	Spain	0	N/A	N/A	1 (Note: 1976 Olympic Games)	No
Eugeni Montesinos (es)	Barcelona	Spain	1	1922	1922	N/A	**Yes**
Martín Montoya	Barcelona	Spain	0	N/A	N/A	1	**Yes**
Pere Valentí Mora	Tarragona	Spain	0	N/A	N/A	1	**Yes**
Gerard Moreno	Barcelona	Spain	18	2019	Active	1	**Yes**
Carlos Muñoz	Barcelona	Spain	6	1990	1991	N/A	**Yes**
Fernando Navarro	Barcelona	Spain	2	2008	2008	1	**Yes**
Joaquín Navarro	Barcelona	Spain	5	1952	1953	N/A	**Yes**
Josep Obiols (es)	Barcelona	Spain	1	1930	1930	N/A	**Yes**
Ferran Olivella	Barcelona	Spain	18	1966	1968	2	**Yes**
Antonio Olmo	Barcelona	Spain	13	1977	1980	3	No
Dani Olmo	Barcelona	Spain	39	2019	Active	3	No
Felip Ortiz	Lleida	Spain	0	N/A	N/A	1	No
Fernando Ortuño	Barcelona	Spain	0	N/A	N/A	1	**Yes**
José Parra	Girona	Spain	7	1950	1951	1	**Yes**
Esteban Pedrol (es)	Tarragona	Spain	1	1935	1935	N/A	**Yes**
Emilio Perelló	Barcelona	Spain	1	1927	1927	N/A	**Yes**
Marcelino Pérez	Barcelona	Spain	13	1977	1979	1	No
Vicente Piera	Barcelona	Spain	15	1922	1931	1	**Yes**
Antonio Pinilla	Barcelona	Spain	0	N/A	N/A	1	**Yes**
**Gerard Piqué**	Barcelona	Spain	102	2009	2018	7	**Yes**
Conrad Portas (es)	Girona	Spain	2	1927	1928	N/A	**Yes**
Pitus Prat (es)	Barcelona	Spain	4	1933	1933	N/A	**Yes**
Javi Puado	Barcelona	Spain	1	2021	Active	1	**Yes**
Lluís Pujol	Barcelona	Spain	1	1969	1969	N/A	**Yes**
**Carles Puyol**	Lleida	Spain	100	2000	2013	7	**Yes**
Josep Raich	Barcelona	Spain	1	1941	1941	N/A	**Yes**
Antoni Ramallets	Barcelona	Spain	35	1950	1961	1	**Yes**
Pepito Ramos	Barcelona	Spain	4	1975	1977	N/A	**Yes**
David Raya	Barcelona	Spain	10	2022	Active	2	**Yes**
Carles Rexach	Barcelona	Spain	15	1969	1978	1	**Yes**
José Luis Riera (es)	Barcelona	Spain	3	1949	1950	N/A	No
Joaquim Rifé	Barcelona	Spain	4	1968	1970	N/A	**Yes**
Sergi Roberto	Tarragona	Spain	10	2016	Active	N/A	**Yes**
Rodri	Barcelona	Spain	4	1962	1962	1	**Yes**
Juan Carlos Rojo	Barcelona	Spain	4	1985	1985	N/A	No
Oriol Romeu	Tarragona	Spain	0	N/A	N/A	1	**Yes**
Isidro Rovira (es)	Barcelona	Spain	2	1941	1941	N/A	**Yes**
Gaspar Rubio	Barcelona	Spain	4	1929	1930	N/A	No
Salvador Sadurní	Tarragona	Spain	10	1963	1969	2	**Yes**
Sagi Liñán	Barcelona	Spain	2	1926	1926	N/A	**Yes**
Isidro Sala	Girona	Spain	0	N/A	N/A	1	No
Josep Samitier	Barcelona	Spain	21	1920	1931	2 (Note: 1920 Olympic Games)	**Yes**
Tente	Barcelona	Spain	14	1978	1984	2 (Note: 1982 FIFA World Cup)	No
Agustín Sancho	Barcelona	Spain	3	1920	1923	1	**Yes**
Joan Sans (es)	Barcelona	Spain	1	1947	1947	N/A	No
Josep Sastre (es)	Barcelona	Spain	1	1930	1930	N/A	**Yes**
Joan Segarra	Barcelona	Spain	25	1951	1962	1	**Yes**
Josep Seguer	Barcelona	Spain	4	1952	1952	N/A	**Yes**
Sergio	Barcelona	Spain	11	2001	2005	1	**Yes**
Pedro Solé	Barcelona	Spain	4	1929	1936	1	**Yes**
Miquel Soler	Girona	Spain	9	1987	1991	1	**Yes**
Daniel Solsona	Barcelona	Spain	7	1973	1981	N/A	**Yes**
Raúl Tamudo	Barcelona	Spain	13	2000	2007	1	**Yes**
Justo Tejada	Barcelona	Spain	8	1958	1961	N/A	**Yes**
Cristian Tello	Barcelona	Spain	1	2013	Active	1	**Yes**
Ricardo Teruel (es)	Barcelona	Spain	4	1941	1942	N/A	**Yes**
Antoni Torres	Lleida	Spain	5	1968	1969	N/A	**Yes**
Curro Torres	Barcelona	Spain	5	2001	2002	1	**Yes**
Adama Traoré	Barcelona	Spain	5	2020	Active	1	No
José Vicente Train	Barcelona	Spain	7	1961	1963	N/A	**Yes**
José Trías (es)	Barcelona	Spain	1	1941	1941	N/A	**Yes**
**Víctor Valdés**	Barcelona	Spain	20	2010	2014	3	**Yes**
Toni Velamazán	Barcelona	Spain	0	N/A	N/A	1	**Yes**
Martí Ventolrà	Barcelona	Spain	12	1930	1936	1	**Yes**
Martí Vergés	Girona	Spain	12	1957	1962	1	**Yes**
Aleix Vidal	Tarragona	Spain	1	2015	Active	N/A	**Yes**
Dídac Vilà	Barcelona	Spain	0	N/A	Active	1	**Yes**
Juan Vizcaíno	Tarragona	Spain	15	1991	1992	N/A	**Yes**
Lamine Yamal	Barcelona	Spain	14	2023	Active	1	No
Ramón Zabalo	Barcelona	Spain	11	1931	1936	1	**Yes**
Ricardo Zamora	Barcelona	Spain	46	1920	1936	2	**Yes**
Konrad de la Fuente	Barcelona	United States	3	2020	2021	N/A	No

== Catalan heritage ==
There are many other international footballers with some Catalan heritage or connection, for example:

- (Uruguay) Luis Barbat
- (France) Daniel Bravo
- (France) Eric Cantona
- (France) Jean Castaneda
- (Algeria) Adlène Guedioura
- (Spain) Andrés Iniesta
- (France) Hugo Lloris
- (Argentina) Leo Messi
- (Belgium) Kevin Mirallas
- (Chile) Fernando Riera
- (France) Gérard Soler
- (Mexico) José Vantolrá

== See also ==
- Catalan Countries
- Catalan football championship
- Catalan Football Federation
- Catalonia national football team
- List of Catalan women's footballers
- List of Basque footballers
- List of FC Barcelona players
- List of Spain international footballers
