= Pitus Prat =

Spanish footballer and manager

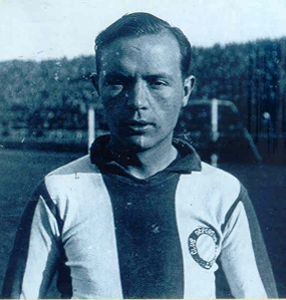

Personal information
- Birth name: José Prat Ripollés
- Date of birth: 26 April 1911
- Place of birth: Barcelona, Catalonia, Spain
- Date of death: 11 March 1988 (aged 76)
- Place of death: Barcelona, Catalonia, Spain
- Position: Forward

Youth career
- Gràcia FC

Senior career*
Years	Team	Apps	(Gls)
1927–1928	Gràcia FC		
1928–1940	Espanyol		
1940–1941	Real Madrid		

International career
1933	Spain	4	(0)

Managerial career
- 1941–1942: Mallorca
- 1947–1948: Terrassa
- 1950–1951: Gimnástica de Torrelavega
- * Club domestic league appearances and goals

José Prat Ripollés, better known as Pitus Prat (26 April 1911 – 11 March 1988), was a Spanish footballer who played as a forward for Espanyol and Real Madrid between 1928 and 1941. He also played four matches for the Spanish national team in 1933. He is best known for being the author of the first-ever goal in the history of La Liga in 1929, as well as the second footballer to play for both Espanyol and Madrid.

He later worked as a manager, taking charge of the likes of Mallorca.

== Playing career ==
=== Club career ===
Born on 26 April 1911 in Barcelona, Prat began his football career in the youth ranks of his hometown club Gràcia FC, making his debut for the first team in 1927, aged 16, where he quickly stood out from the rest, so at the end of the season, in 1928, he was signed by Espanyol.

Prat was then a member of Espanyol's historic 1928–29 season, to which he contributed with only 9 official appearances, including two in the Catalan championship and one in the Copa del Rey, thus being a member of the squad that won both of those titles. He did not play in the cup final, in which Espanyol defeated Real Madrid 2–1, but a week later he started in the first match of the inaugural edition of La Liga, as coach Jack Greenwell wanted to give the cup-winning team a rest, lining up the substitutes in the debut of the Spanish league, which took place on 10 February 1929 at the Sarrià Stadium, where he scored the opening goal of the match in the 5th minute to help his side to a 3–2 victory over Real Unión, thus going down in history not only as the author of the first-ever La Liga goal in the club's history, but also the first-ever goal in the history of La Liga. Three other matches had started at the same time, but Prat's 5th-minute strike, described as "a good right-footed shot" that went past Union's goalkeeper Antonio Emery, was the one who took this historic honour, ahead of Atlético Madrid's Vicente Palacio, who scored in the 14th minute of his respective match.

That was, however, the only goal he scored that season, starting in only 6 league matches, a number that went even lower in the following season, when he only played in three games. His lack of playing time was the result of being the second-in-line to the untouchable Martín Vantolrá, so when he left the club in December 1930, Prat was able to finally establish himself as a starter on the right wing of the attack. He remained loyal to the club for 12 years, from 1928 until 1940, scoring a total of 94 goals in 249 official matches, and helping his side win a further three Catalan Championships (1932–33, 1936–37, and 1939–40), and another Copa del Rey in 1940, although he once again did not play the final, in which Espanyol defeated Madrid 3–2 after extra-time.

In October 1940, Espanyol released the 29-year-old Prat, who joined Real Madrid, which was still recovering from the Spanish Civil War. In doing so, he became the second footballer to play for both Espanyol and Madrid, only after Ricardo Zamora. He played just a single season in the capital, featuring in only five official matches with the white shirt. In total, he scored 35 goals in 133 La Liga matches.

=== International career ===
Prat earned all of his four international caps for Spain within a period of two months in 1933, all in friendly matches and all against different opponents, resulting in two wins, one draw, and one loss. In his debut against Portugal in Vigo, he played alongside his club teammates Pedro Solé and Bosch in an eventual 3–0 victory. In his last international match, he helped his side to a 13–0 victory over Bulgaria, which still is Spain's biggest-ever victory.

== Manegerial career ==
After his career as a player ended, Prat remained linked to Espanyol, now as a coach, which he oversaw in the 1943–44 season, forming a tandem with Crisant Bosch. He then went on to coach Mallorca (1941–42), Terrassa (1947–48), Gimnástica de Torrelavega (1950–51).

== Later life and death ==
After leaving the world of football, Prat became a municipal official, working as a tax collecter in the Libertad market in the Gracia district of Barcelona. Prat died in Barcelona on 11 March 1988, at the age of 76.

== Legacy ==
On 10 February 2019, coinciding with the 90th anniversary of Prat's historic goal, Espanyol and its Foundation made a floral offering at his grave in the Les Corts cemetery, which was followed by a small tribute held in the Sarrià gardens, where that first league match was played.

== Honours ==
RCD Espanyol

- Catalan championship
  - Champions (4): 1928–29, 1932–33, 1936–37, and 1939–40
- Copa del Rey
  - Champions (2): 1929 and 1940
