= Carlos Altés =

Spanish footballer

Personal information
- Full name: Carlos Altés Alonso
- Date of birth: 3 September 1907
- Place of birth: Castellón de la Plana, Spain
- Place of death: Spain
- Position: Midfielder

Senior career*
Years	Team	Apps	(Gls)
- CD Castàlia
1923–1924	Castellón		
1924–1926	CD Castàlia		
1926–1928	Castellón		
1928–1929	Espanyol	3	(0)
1929–1930	Castellón		
1930–1933	Martinenc		
1931–1932	Júpiter		
- * Club domestic league appearances and goals

Carlos Altés Alonso (3 September 1907 – unknown) was a Spanish footballer who played as a midfielder for Castellón and Espanyol.

== Career ==
Born on 3 September 1907 in Castellón de la Plana, Altés began his career at his hometown clubs Castàlia and Castellón in 1923, aged 16, playing for the former between 1924 and 1926 and for the latter between 1926 and 1928.

At Castellón, he worked under coach Jack Greenwell, who had previously led Barça and who was signed by Espanyol in 1928, where he strongly recommended the signing of Altés. Thus, Espanyol asked the Valencian Federation to cancel the contract that linked him to Castellón without contacting them, which caused Castellón to suspend Altés from employment and salary while awaiting the decision of the Federation, which ruled in favor of the Castalia club. With Espanyol refusing to pay any amount as a transfer fee, the conflict was only resolved with a friendly match in Castellón on 17 June 1928, but with the condition that the renowned Ricardo Zamora would play in it; the local team won 2–1.

Altés overcame all the controversy surrounding his signing to play four official matches for the club in the 1928–29 season, three in the league and one in the Catalan championship, thus being a member of the Espanyol squad that won the regional title. Espanyol also won the 1929 Copa del Rey, beating Real Madrid 2–1 in the final, but he failed to play a single cup match of that campaign, thus not being considered one of its winners. Despite his short stay there, he featured in Espanyol's first-ever La Liga match on 10 February 1929, helping his side to a 3–2 victory over Real Unión.

After leaving Espanyol, Altés returned to Castellón (1929–30), but in 1930, he signed for Martinenc, where he remained for several seasons, until 1933, performing at a high level. Some sources state that he also played for Júpiter in the 1931–32 season. On 20 August 1933, he was the subject of a tribute match between Martinenc and the Catalan national team in Sant Martí, which ended in a 5–3 loss.

== Honours ==
RCD Espanyol

- Catalan championship: 1928–29
