= Teodoro Mauri =

Spanish footballer and manager

Mauri
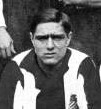

Personal information
- Full name: Teodoro Mauri Moreno
- Date of birth: 14 June 1903
- Place of birth: Barcelona, Spain
- Date of death: 4 July 1960 (aged 57)
- Place of death: Barcelona
- Position: Striker

Senior career*
Years	Team	Apps	(Gls)
- Catalunya Les Corts
- Europa
1922–1923	Júpiter		
1923–1927	Espanyol		
1927–1928	Juventud Asturiana		
1929	Castellón		
1929–1930	Europa		
1932–1933	Vilafranca		

International career
1923–1926	Catalonia		

Managerial career
- 1929: Castellón
- 1940–1941: Castellón
- 1941–1942: Hércules
- 1942–1943: Cádiz
- 1943–1944: Figueres
- 1946: Castellón
- 1948–1949: Mallorca
- * Club domestic league appearances and goals

Teodoro Mauri Moreno (14 June 1903 – 4 July 1960) was a former Spanish football forward and manager.

== Playing career ==
As a youth played for the Catalunya Les Corts, Europa and Júpiter until he made the leap to Espanyol. With Perico's he became a legend of the 1920s, along with Ricardo Zamora, José Padrón, Pedro Solé or Crisant Bosch.

In June 1927 he moved to Havana where he signed a one-year contract with the Club Juventud Asturiana. The Cuban team was trained by the Spanish Paco Bru, who was drafted by the Cuban regime to promote football and ensure the registration of Cuba in FIFA. Juventud also played the Spanish player Pedro Colls. And even in the expedition traveled the Spanish referee José Llovera to referee matches in the country of Cuba.

In the 1929 season played in Castellón in the third level in a new league format nationally, and even took over the team as coach.

== Coaching career ==
As a coach got coaches in La Liga with Hércules, fell to second division at this season. Castellón was the club where good records left as coach. Directed him in three different stages. In the 1940-41 season he was champion of the Second division and managed the first ascent of club to La Liga.
