= Gabriel Juvé =

Spanish footballer (1908–1977)

Personal information
- Full name: Gabriel Juvé Malla
- Birth name: Gabriel Juvé i Malla
- Date of birth: 25 May 1908
- Place of birth: Vilafranca del Penedès, Spain
- Date of death: 19 October 1977 (aged 69)
- Place of death: Vilafranca del Penedès, Spain
- Position: Forward

Senior career*
| Years | Team | Apps | (Gls) |
| ?–1928 | Vilafranca | | |
| 1928–1934 | Espanyol | | |
- Vilafranca

International career
| 1931–1932 | Catalonia | 3 | (1) |
- * Club domestic league appearances and goals

Gabriel Juvé Malla (25 May 1908 – 19 October 1977) was a Spanish footballer who played as a forward for Espanyol in the early 1930s. He also played three matches for the Catalan national team in the early 1930s.

== Playing career ==
=== Club career ===
Born on 25 May 1908 in the Catalonian town of Vilafranca del Penedès, Juvé began his career in the youth ranks of his hometown club Vilafranca, growing up there until he signed for Espanyol in 1928, aged 21. On 17 March 1929, he started against the Catalan national team in a tribute match to Patricio Caicedo, which ended in a 1–5 loss.

Initially, Juvé served as the regular substitute for Crisant Bosch, so his playing time was severely limited, but when Bosch was sanctioned with a 4-month suspension for an alleged assault on a referee in April 1929, Juvé began training with the starting eleven, playing 10 consecutive matches, including one match in Espanyol's triumphant campaign in the 1929 Copa del Rey. Following José Padrón's departure, Juvé became an undisputed starter on the left wing, forming a great attacking partnership with Bosch.

Juvé stayed at Espanyol for six seasons, scoring a total of 28 goals in 89 official matches, including 10 goals in 56 La Liga matches. After his retirement, Juvé became a coach, taking over, among others, Vilafranca.

=== International career ===
As an Espanyol player, Juvé was eligible to play for the Catalan national team, scoring one goal in three appearances in the early 1930s. He made his debut at Les Corts on 4 June 1931, in a friendly match against a Prague XI. The following year, on 26 June 1932, he scored a goal to help Catalonia to a 3–2 friendly victory over Torino FC, a team that fielded 8 internationals from the Italian national team, such as Adolfo Baloncieri and Julio Libonatti.

== Death ==
Juvé died in Vilafranca del Penedès on 19 October 1977, at the age of 69.

== Honours ==
Espanyol

- Catalan championship
  - Champions (1): 1928–29
- Copa del Rey:
  - Champions (1): 1929
