= Rafael Oramas =

Spanish footballer

Rafael Oramas Navarro
- Oramas during Espanyol's tour on Argentina

Personal information
- Full name: Rafael Oramas Navarro
- Date of birth: 13 April 1904
- Place of birth: Las Palmas, Canary Islands, Spain
- Date of death: 21 April 1968 (aged 64)
- Place of death: Barcelona, Catalonia, Spain
- Position: Forward

Senior career*
Years	Team	Apps	(Gls)
1922–1924	Santa Catalina FC		
1924–1925	Marino FC		
1925	Real Club Victoria		
1925–1929	RCD Espanyol		
1929–1930	Racing de Madrid		
1930–1931	Recreativo de Huelva		

International career
1925–1929	Catalonia	2	(0)
- * Club domestic league appearances and goals

Rafael Oramas Navarro (13 April 1904 – 21 April 1968) was a Spanish footballer who played as a forward for RCD Espanyol and Racing de Madrid.

He was the first in a family saga of football players, including Rafael Oramas Cabrera and Alexis Trujillo.

== Early life ==
Born on 13 April 1904 in Las Palmas, Oramas began playing football in the streets of his neighborhood as well as in the adjacent Santa Catalina neighborhood.

== Playing career ==
=== Club career ===
During the resurgence of football in the Canary Islands in the early 1920s, Oramas was among the young group of players who founded Santa Catalina FC, where he featured alongside the likes of Espino and José Padrón. His other brother, Pancho Oramas, was an excellent right winger who started in that famous primitive Unión Arenal. He was noted for his high skills in controlling the ball, which caught the attention of Marino FC, one of the main clubs in the Canary Islands, who signed him in 1924, but given the lack of players from Real Club Victoria for its upcoming tour, they recruited Oramas to reinforce them. During a tour on Catalonia, in which they faced clubs such as UE Sants, Sabadell, and Iluro SC, he was noticed by RCD Espanyol, who signed him in the summer of 1925, together with his teammate Padrón.

Although he had played as a midfield distributor in his previous teams, Oramas played as a center forward in Espanyol, being described as a player with a refined technique, serious, tenacious, and tireless. He was very skilled and at the same time very practical due to his regularity and his performance, occupying any position that was assigned to him. He participated in the American tour that Espanyol made to raise funds to cover the costs of the construction of the Sarrià Stadium. He was also a member of the Espanyol team that won the 1929 Copa del Rey. On 10 February 1929, Oramas went down in history as one of the eleven footballers who played in the very first La Liga match in the club's history, in which he scored two goals to help his side to a victory over Real Unión.

Oramas played with Espanyol for four seasons until 1929, winning the 1929 Copa del Rey, although he did not play in the final. Despite the expectations created, he never really took off, not because of lack of quality, but rather due to his inconsistency and his cold character. Furthermore, the arrival of Domingo Broto meant Oramas ceasing to have the predominant role of previous campaigns, so he decided to leave at the end of the season, playing for Racing de Madrid (1929–30) and Recreativo de Huelva (1930–31) before retiring.

=== International career ===
Despite being from the Canary Islands, Oramas played two games for the Catalan national team, making his debut on 13 December 1925, in a friendly against Czechoslovakia at Sarrià, helping his side to a 2–1. Four years later, on 12 May, he earned his second cap for Catalonia in a friendly against FC Barcelona, where he either suffered a stroke in his leg that took him away from football or suffered a knee injury that made him lose his abilities and prevented him from performing at the highest level.

== Death ==
After retiring, Oramas returned to his homeland to become a port freight traffic. He eventually settled in Barcelona, where he got married and also where he died on 21 April 1968, at the age of 64.

A street in Las Palmas was named after him.

== Honours ==
Espanyol

- Catalan championship
  - Champions (1): 1928–29

Copa del Rey:

- Champions (1): 1929
