= Domingo Broto =

Spanish footballer

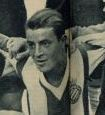
- Broto in 1928

Personal information
- Full name: Domingo Broto Regalés
- Date of birth: 28 July 1903
- Place of birth: Terrassa, Catalonia, Spain
- Date of death: 16 March 1960 (aged 56)
- Place of death: Oloron-Sainte-Marie, France
- Position: Inside right

Senior career*
Years	Team	Apps	(Gls)
1922–1928	Terrassa FC		
1928–1930	Espanyol		
1930–1931	CD Castellón		
1931–1933	Terrassa FC		

International career
1926-1929	Catalonia	7	(5)
Medal record
Catalonia
Prince of Asturias Cup
Gold medal – first place	1926 Prince of Asturias Cup	Team
- * Club domestic league appearances and goals

Domingo Broto Regalés (28 July 1903 - 16 March 1960) was a Spanish footballer who played as a inside right.

== Club career ==
Born in Catalonia, he joined the first team of Terrassa FC during the 1922–23 season. In Terrassa, he stood out as an extraordinary goal scorer, which earned him a move to Espanyol in April 1928, along with Crisant Bosch and Julio Káiser. He played a pivotal role in helping the club win the 1928-29 Catalonia championship and reach the 1929 Copa del Rey Final, which Espanyol won after a 2–1 win over Real Madrid. The following season, under Jack Greenwell, he lost prominence in favor of Ricardo Gallart.

== International career ==
Being a Terrassa FC player, he was eligible to play for the Catalonia national team, earning several caps between 1926 and 1929, in which he scored 5 goals, all of which in 1926, netting in a 4–0 win over a Paris XI on 16 May, a brace in a 5–2 win over a Zürich XI on 11 July, but most importantly, Broto scored both goals of a 2–0 win over Asturias in the first leg of the 1926 Prince of Asturias Cup Final, which was an inter-regional competition organized by the RFEF. A 4–3 win in the second leg meant a record-breaking third Prince of Asturias Cup title for Catalonia.

== Honours ==
=== Club ===
Espanyol

Copa del Rey:

- Champions (1): 1929

=== International ===
Catalonia

Prince of Asturias Cup:

- Champions (1): 1926
