= Rafael González (Spanish footballer) =

Spanish footballer and manager (1903–1961)

Personal information
- Full name: Rafael González Martín
- Date of birth: 28 February 1903
- Place of birth: Las Palmas, Spain
- Date of death: 28 November 1961 (aged 58)
- Place of death: Barcelona, Spain
- Position: Defender

Senior career*
Years	Team	Apps	(Gls)
1921–1923	CD Gran Canaria		
1923–1925	Marino		
1925–1929	Espanyol	12	(0)
1929–1931	Atlético de Sabadell		
1931–1932	Zaragoza		

Managerial career
- 1931–1932: Zaragoza
- 1933–1935: Logroñés
- 1936: Vic
- 1940–1941: Girona
- * Club domestic league appearances and goals

Rafael González Martín (28 February 1903 – 28 November 1961) was a Spanish footballer who played as a defender for Espanyol in the late 1920s. After retiring, he became a manager, taking over the likes of Zaragoza and Logroñés in the 1930s.

== Early life ==
Born on 28 February 1903 in Las Palmas, González began playing football with his friends in the shady fields of the Fuera de la Portada neighborhood, and they soon developed into organized teams with pompous names which played matches that either lasted hours or were interrupted by the city guards.

== Playing career ==
González began his career at his hometown club CD Gran Canaria in 1921, aged 18, from which he joined Marino, where he quickly stood out for his defensive skills, as he was tall, strong, and had a powerful physical and athletic abilities, thus being considered the best player in his position. On 30 July 1925, he sailed for Catalonia, accompanied by Paco Bru, the coach of Espanyol, which signed González in August, as well as fellow Canarians José Padrón and Rafael Oramas just a few months later.

González stayed at Espanyol for four years, from 1925 until 1929, playing a total of 28 official matches, including 12 La Liga matches in its inaugural edition in 1929, and the 1929 Copa del Rey final, helping his side to a 2–1 victory over Real Madrid. (Note: Some sources wrongly state that it was Portas who played in the final and not González.) However, he was sidelined due to a serious injury suffered at the Montjuïc stadium in June 1929, so he then joined Atlético de Sabadell.

== Managerial career ==
After retiring, González became a coach, taking over Zaragoza CD during the 1931–32 season, where he was also a substitute player. In 1933, he took charge of Logroñés, a position he held for two years, until 1935. Following a brief stint at the helm of Vic in 1936, González took over Girona in the 1940–41 season.

== Death ==
After leaving the world of football, González settled in Barcelona, where he married and where he died on 28 November 1961, at the age of 58.

== Honours ==
Espanyol

Catalan championship

- Champions (1): 1928–29

Copa del Rey:

- Champions (1): 1929
