= Rafael González =

Rafael González may refer to:

- Rafael González (Chilean footballer) (born 1950), Chilean football midfielder
- Rafael González (fencer) (born 1920), Argentine fencer
- Rafael González (judoka) (born 1958), Mexican Olympic judoka
- Rafael González Martín (born 1903), Spanish footballer
- Rafael González Reséndiz (born 1979), Mexican politician
- Rafael González Tovar (born 1953), Spanish doctor and politician
- Rafael González (wrestler) (born 1956), Puerto Rican Olympic wrestler
- Rafa (footballer, born 1970) (Rafael González Robles), Spanish footballer
