= Spain national football team results (1920–1939) =

The Spain national football team represents Spain in international association football and is controlled by the Royal Spanish Football Federation. The Spanish team played their first match during the 1920 Summer Olympics on the 28 August 1920, a 1–0 win over Denmark. During that tournament they also defeated Sweden, Italy and the Netherlands to claim the silver medal after they lost to Belgium in the quarter-finals.

The following year, Spain hosted their first match with a 2–0 win over Belgium at the San Mamés Stadium. They played in the 1924 Olympics losing to Italy in the first round. At the 1928 Olympics, they played their first team from outside of Europe, defeating Mexico 7–1 before losing to Italy in the quarter-finals.

From the nation's first fixture to the end of the decade, Spain played in 32 fixtures, winning 23, drawing four and losing the remaining five. Of the side victories, five were over Iberian neighbors Portugal and four were against France. Against Italy though, they only won once from seven attempts during this period.

== Results ==
Spain's score is shown first in each case.

Key
Colour (with score)	Meaning
	Defeat
	Draw
	Win

== 1920s ==
28 August 1920 (Belgium) 1920 Summer Olympics Round 1	Spain	1–0	Denmark	(Belgium) Brussels
15:30	Patricio 54'	Report		Stadium: La Butte; Attendance: 3,000; Referee: (Netherlands) Willem Eymers

29 August 1920 (Belgium) 1920 Summer Olympics Quarter finals	Belgium	3–1	Spain	(Belgium) Antwerp
17:00	Coppée 37', 52', 55'	Report	80' (pen.) Arrate	Stadium: Olympisch Stadion; Attendance: 18,000; Referee: (Netherlands) Johannes Mutters

1 September 1920 (Belgium) 1920 Summer Olympics Repechage first round	Spain	2–1	Sweden	(Belgium) Antwerp
15:30 (UTC+1:00)	Belauste 50'; Acedo 80'	Report	25' Dahl	Stadium: Broodstraat; Attendance: 1,500; Referee: (Italy) Giovanni Mauro

2 September 1920 (Belgium) 1920 Summer Olympics Repechage second round	Spain	2–0	Italy	(Belgium) Antwerp
14:30 (UTC+1:00)	Sesúmaga 43', 72'	Report		Stadium: Olympisch Stadion; Attendance: 10,000; Referee: (Belgium) Paul Putz
Note: Félix Sesúmaga set the goal scoring record for Spain (2 goals)

5 September 1920 (Belgium) 1920 Summer Olympics 3rd-4th	Spain	3–1	Netherlands	(Belgium) Antwerp
15:00	Sesúmaga 7', 35'; Pichichi 72'	Report	68' Groosjohan	Stadium: Olympisch Stadion; Attendance: 14,000; Referee: (Belgium) Paul Putz
Note: Félix Sesúmaga set the goal scoring record for Spain (4 goals)

9 October 1921 Friendly	Spain	2–0	Belgium	(Spain) Bilbao
16:00 (UTC+0:00)	Alcántara 55', 80'	Report		Stadium: San Mamés; Attendance: 20,000; Referee: (Portugal) Jorge Vieira

18 December 1921 Friendly	Spain	3–1	Portugal	(Spain) Madrid
	Meana 20'; Alcántara 23', 50'	Report	75' (pen.) Augusto	Stadium: Campo de O'Donnell; Attendance: 14,000; Referee: (Belgium) Charles Barette

30 April 1922 Friendly	France	0–4	Spain	(France) Bordeaux
		Report	20', 33' Travieso; 27', 35' Alcántara	Stadium: Le Bouscat; Attendance: 10,000; Referee: (Belgium) Raphaël Van Praag
Note: Paulino Alcántara set the goal scoring record for Spain (2 goals)

17 December 1922 Friendly	Portugal	1–2	Spain	(Portugal) Lisbon
14:30 (UTC+0:00)	Gonçalves 23'	Report	60' Piera; 80' Monjardín	Stadium: Lumiar; Attendance: 25,000; Referee: (France) Georges Balvay

28 January 1923 Friendly	Spain	3–0	France	(Spain) San Sebastián
15:30 (UTC+0:00)	Monjardín 11', 83'; Zabala 42'	Report		Stadium: Atotxa; Attendance: 15,000; Referee: (Belgium) Charles Barette

4 February 1923 Friendly	Belgium	1–0	Spain	(Belgium) Antwerp
14:30 (UTC+0:00)	Coppée 75' (pen.)	Report		Stadium: Olympisch Stadion; Attendance: 30,000; Referee: (Netherlands) Job Mutters

16 December 1923 Friendly	Spain	3–0	Portugal	(Spain) Sevilla
15:00 (UTC+0:00)	Zabala 14', 57', 70'	Report		Stadium: Estadio Reina Victoria; Attendance: 10,000; Referee: (Belgium) Paul Putz

9 March 1924 Friendly	Italy	0–0	Spain	(Italy) Milan
15:00 (UTC+1:00)		Report		Attendance: 20,000; Referee: (Belgium) Henri Christophe

25 May 1924 (France) 1924 Summer Olympics First round	Italy	1–0	Spain	(France) Colombes
15:30	Vallana 84' (o.g.)	Report		Stadium: Stade Olympique; Attendance: 20,000; Referee: (France) Marcel Slawik

21 December 1924 Friendly	Spain	2–1	Austria	(Spain) Barcelona
14:30 (UTC+0:00)	Juantegui 3'; Samitier 87'	Report	35' Horvath	Stadium: Les Corts; Attendance: 25,000; Referee: (Belgium) Charles Barette

17 May 1925 Friendly	Portugal	0–2	Spain	(Portugal) Lisbon
16:30 (UTC+0:00)		Report	8' Carmelo; 17' Piera	Stadium: Lumiar; Attendance: 17,000; Referee: (France) Gaston Vallat

1 June 1925 Friendly	Switzerland	0–3	Spain	(Switzerland) Bern
16:00 (UTC+1:00)		Report	55', 60', 70' Errazquin	Stadium: Neufeld; Attendance: 20,000; Referee: (England) John Fowler

14 June 1925 Friendly	Spain	1–0	Italy	(Spain) Valencia
17:30 (UTC+0:00)	Errazquin 25'	Report		Stadium: Mestalla; Attendance: 20,000; Referee: (England) Harry Kingscott

27 September 1925 Friendly	Austria	0–1	Spain	(Austria) Vienna
15:00 (+1:00)		Report	15' Cubells	Stadium: Hohe Warte; Attendance: 55,000; Referee: (Czechoslovakia) František Cejna

4 October 1925 Friendly	Hungary	0–1	Spain	(Hungary) Budapest
15:30 (+1:00)		Report	52' Carmelo	Stadium: Ferencváros; Attendance: 34,830; Referee: (Austria) Eugen Braun

19 December 1926 Friendly	Spain	4–2	Hungary	(Spain) Vigo
15:00 (UTC+0:00)	Errazquin 12', 87'; Goiburu 17'; Carmelo 66'	Report	36' Opata; 84' Braun	Stadium: Campo de Coia; Attendance: 15,000; Referee: (England) Albert Prince-Cox

17 April 1927 Friendly	Spain	1–0	Switzerland	(Spain) Santander
17:00 (UTC+1:00)	Óscar 34'	Report		Stadium: El Sardinero; Attendance: 10,000; Referee: (England) Albert Fogg

22 May 1927 Friendly	France	1–4	Spain	(France) Colombes
15:00 (UTC+1:00)	Boyer 22'	Report	24' (pen.), 75' (pen.) Zaldúa; 27' Yermo; 68' Olaso	Stadium: Stade Olympique; Attendance: 25,000; Referee: (England) Harry Kingscott

29 May 1927 Friendly	Italy	2–0	Spain	(Italy) Bologna
16:15 (UTC+1:00)	Baloncieri 31'; Zaldúa 52' (o.g.)	Report		Stadium: Stadio Littoriale; Attendance: 60,000; Referee: (England) Stanley Rous

8 January 1928 Friendly	Portugal	2–2	Spain	(Portugal) Lisbon
14:30 (UTC+0:00)	Martins 25' (pen.); Santos 84'	Report	30' (pen.) Zaldúa; 58' Goiburu	Stadium: Estádio do Lumiar; Attendance: 30,000; Referee: (England) Albert Prince-Cox

22 April 1928 Friendly	Spain	1–1	Italy	(Spain) Gijón
16:30 (UTC+1:00)	Quesada 15' (pen.)	Report	66' Libonatti	Stadium: El Molinón; Attendance: 20,000; Referee: (Switzerland) René Mercet

30 May 1928 (Netherlands) 1928 Summer Olympics Round of 16	Spain	7–1	Mexico	(Netherlands) Amsterdam
14:00	Regueiro 13', 27'; Yermo 43', 63', 85'; Marculeta 66'; Mariscal 70'	Report	76' Carreño	Stadium: Olympic Stadium; Attendance: 2,344; Referee: (Hungary) Gabor Boronkay

1 June 1928 (Netherlands) 1928 Summer Olympics Quarter-finals	Italy	1–1	Spain	(Netherlands) Amsterdam
19:00	Baloncieri 63'	Report	11' Zaldúa	Stadium: Olympic Stadium; Attendance: 3,388; Referee: (Uruguay) Domingo Lombardi

4 June 1928 (Netherlands) 1928 Summer Olympics Quarter-finals replay	Italy	7–1	Spain	(Netherlands) Amsterdam
14:00	Magnozzi 14'; Schiavo 15'; Baloncieri 18'; Bernardini 40'; Rivolta 72'; Levratto 76', 77'	Report	47' Yermo	Stadium: Olympic Stadium; Attendance: 4,770; Referee: (Netherlands) Hans Boekman

17 March 1929 Friendly	Spain	5–0	Portugal	(Spain) Sevilla
16:00 (UTC+0:00)	Rubio 2', 9', 20'; Padrón 30', 45'	Report		Stadium: Heliópolis; Attendance: 14,000; Referee: (Belgium) John Langenus

14 April 1929 Friendly	Spain	8–1	France	(Spain) Zaragoza
16:30 (UTC+0:00)	Bienzobas 6', 60' (pen.); Rubio 40', 56', 77', 81'; Goiburu 73', 80'	Report	87' Veinante	Stadium: Estadio Torrero; Attendance: 15,000; Referee: (England) Albert Prince-Cox
Note: Gaspar Rubio set the goal scoring record for Spain (7 goals)

15 May 1929 Friendly	Spain	4–3	England	(Spain) Madrid
17:00 (UTC+1:00)	Rubio 40', 80'; Lazcano 42'; Goiburu 82'	Report	15', 73' (pen.) Carter; 20' Bradford	Stadium: Metropolitano; Attendance: 45,000; Referee: (Belgium) John Langenus
Note: 1929 Spain v England football match

== 1930s ==
1 January 1930 Friendly	Spain	1–0	Czechoslovakia	(Spain) Montjuïc, Barcelona
15:00 (UTC)	Sastre 75'	Report		Attendance: 40,000; Referee: (Belgium) Henri Christophe

14 June 1930 Friendly	Czechoslovakia	2–0	Spain	(Czechoslovakia) Letná Stadium, Prague
18:00 (UTC+1:00)	Hojer 62' (pen.); Svoboda 83'	Report		Attendance: 22,000; Referee: (Belgium) John Langenus

22 June 1930 Friendly	Italy	2–3	Spain	(Italy) Stadio Littoriale, Bologna
17:00 (UTC+1:00)	Costantino 3', 40'	Report	30', 72' Regueiro; 87' Ventolrà	Attendance: 46,000; Referee: (Belgium) Raphaël Van Praag

30 November 1930 Friendly	Portugal	0–1	Spain	(Portugal) Campo do Ameal, Porto
15:00 (UTC)		Report	16' Peña	Attendance: 20,000; Referee: (Belgium) Louis Baert

19 April 1931 Friendly	Spain	0–0	Italy	(Spain) San Mamés, Bilbao
16:30 (UTC)		Report		Attendance: 22,000; Referee: (Belgium) Louis Baert

26 April 1931 Friendly	Spain	1–1	Republic of Ireland	(Spain) Montjuïc, Barcelona
17:00 (UTC)	Arocha 38'	Report	35' Moore	Attendance: 50,000; Referee: (Portugal) Silvestre Rosmaninho

9 December 1931 Friendly	England	7–1	Spain	(England) Highbury, London
	Smith 2', 44'; Johnson 3', 76'; Crooks 50', 85'; Dean 68'	Report	87' Gorostiza	Attendance: 55,000; Referee: (Germany) Peco Bauwens

13 December 1931 Friendly	Republic of Ireland	0–5	Spain	(Republic of Ireland) Dalymount Park, Dublin
14:30 (UTC)		Report	6', 34' Regueiro; 40' Arocha; 80' Samitier; 88' Ventolrà	Attendance: 35,000; Referee: (Belgium) John Langenus

24 April 1932 Friendly	Spain	2–1	Yugoslavia	(Spain) Buenavista, Oviedo
16:30 (UTC)	Lángara 25'; Regueiro 27'	Report	30' Vujadinović	Attendance: 25,000; Referee: (Portugal) João Tavares da Silva

2 April 1933 Friendly	Spain	3–0	Portugal	(Spain) Balaídos, Vigo
16:30 (UTC)	Larrinaga 22'; Elícegui 59', 65'	Report		Attendance: 20,000; Referee: (Belgium) John Langenus

23 April 1933 Friendly	France	1–0	Spain	(France) Yves-du-Manoir, Colombes
15:00 (UTC+1:00)	Nicolas 32'	Report		Attendance: 45,010; Referee: (Switzerland) William Bangerter

30 April 1933 Friendly	Yugoslavia	1–1	Spain	(Kingdom of Yugoslavia) Stadion S.K. Jugoslavija, Belgrade
16:15 (UTC+1:00)	65' Marjanović	Report	Elícegui 36'	Attendance: 17,000; Referee: (Hungary) Mihály Iváncsics

21 May 1933 Friendly	Spain	13–0	Bulgaria	(Spain) Chamartín, Madrid
17:00 (UTC)	Chacho 6', 9', 21', 68', 77', 87'; Regueiro 29', 76'; Elícegui 40', 42', 59'; Mishtalov 46' (o.g.); Bosch 85'	Report		Attendance: 60,000; Referee: (Portugal) António Palhinhas
Note: Biggest victory of the Spain football team and heaviest defeat of the Bulgaria football team

11 March 1934 (Italy) 1934 World Cup Qualification	Spain	9–0	Portugal	(Spain) Chamartín, Madrid
16:00 (UTC)	Chacho 3'; Lángara 10', 12' (pen.), 46', 77', 86'; Regueiro 68', 75'; Ventolrà 76'	Report		Attendance: 50,000; Referee: (Belgium) Raphaël van Praag

18 March 1934 (Italy) 1934 World Cup Qualification	Portugal	1–2	Spain	(Portugal) Lumiar, Lisbon
16:00 (UTC)	Silva 11'	Report	13', 25' Lángara	Attendance: 35,000; Referee: (Belgium) Raphaël van Praag

27 May 1934 (Italy) 1934 World Cup First round	Spain	3–1	Brazil	(Italy) Luigi Ferraris, Genoa
16:00 (UTC+1:00)	Iraragorri 17' (pen.); Lángara 25', 28'	Report	55' Leônidas	Attendance: 21,000; Referee: (Germany) Alfred Birlem

31 May 1934 (Italy) 1934 World Cup Quarter-finals	Italy	1 – 1 (a.e.t.)	Spain	(Italy) Giovanni Berta, Florence
	Ferrari 44'	Report	31' Regueiro	Attendance: 35,000; Referee: (Belgium) Louis Baert

1 June 1934 (Italy) 1934 World Cup Quarter-finals replay	Italy	1–0	Spain	(Italy) Giovanni Berta, Florence
16:30 (UTC+1:00)	Meazza 12'	Report		Attendance: 34,000; Referee: (Switzerland) Rene Mercet
Note: 50th international match of the Spain football team

24 January 1935 Friendly	Spain	2–0	France	(Spain) Chamartín, Madrid
15:00 (UTC)	Regueiro 13'; Hilario 78'	Report		Attendance: 22,000; Referee: (England) Walter Lewington

5 May 1935 Friendly	Portugal	3–3	Spain	(Portugal) Lumiar, Lisbon
16:45 (UTC+1:00)	Soeiro 61'; Pinga 70', 77' (pen.)	Report	23', 38' Lángara; 58' Gorostiza	Attendance: 50,000; Referee: (France) Roger Conrié

12 May 1935 Friendly	Germany	1–2	Spain	(Nazi Germany) Müngersdorfer, Köln
15:00 (UTC+1:00)	Conen 11'	Report	29', 45' Lángara	Attendance: 74,000; Referee: (Belgium) John Langenus

19 January 1936 Friendly	Spain	4–5	Austria	(Spain) Metropolitano, Madrid
15:00 (UTC)	Lángara 26', 48'; Regueiro 28', 61'	Report	4' Zischek; 31' Binder; 58' Bican; 69', 73' Hanreiter	Attendance: 40,000; Referee: (Belgium) John Langenus

23 February 1936 Friendly	Spain	1–2	Germany	(Spain) Montjuïc, Barcelona
16:00	Regueiro 34'	Report	15', 68' Fath	Attendance: 44,000; Referee: (Belgium) John Langenus

26 April 1936 Friendly	Czechoslovakia	1–0	Spain	(Czechoslovakia) Letná Stadium, Prague
16:00 (+1:00)	Zajíček 12' (pen.)	Report		Attendance: 30,000; Referee: (Germany) Peco Bauwens

3 May 1936 Friendly	Switzerland	0–2	Spain	(Switzerland) Neufeld, Bern
16:30 (UTC+1:00)		Report	62' Lángara; 64' Lecue	Attendance: 15,000; Referee: (Germany) Karl Weingärtner

== See also ==
- Spain national football team results
