= Ricardo Gallart =

Spanish footballer and manager (1907–1993)

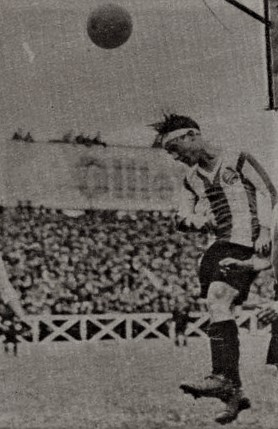
- Ricardo Gallart heading the ball

Personal information
- Full name: Ricardo Gallart Selma
- Birth name: Ricard Gallart i Selma
- Date of birth: 17 January 1907
- Place of birth: Barcelona, Catalonia, Spain
- Date of death: 6 November 1993 (aged 86)
- Place of death: Barcelona, Catalonia, Spain
- Height: 1.65 m (5 ft 5 in)
- Position: Forward

Youth career
- ?–1925: FC Espanya

Senior career*
Years	Team	Apps	(Gls)
1925–1927	Gràcia FC		
1927–1928	UE Sants		
1928–1930	Espanyol		
1930–1943	Real Oviedo		
1939–1940	→ Racing de Ferrol (on loan)		
1943–1944	Lucense		
1944–1949	Orensana		
1949–1950	Flaviense de Chaves		

International career
1926–1931	Catalonia	6	(3)
1934–1937	Spain (unofficial)	2	(1)

Managerial career
- 1943–1944: Lucense
- 1948–1949: Orensana
- 1951–1952: Orensana
- 1955–1957: Terrassa
- 1957–1958: Hércules
- 1958–1959: Girona
- UD Sitges
- Balaguer
- Amposta
- Atlético Vallès
- UD Cassà
- 1967–?: Mataró
- * Club domestic league appearances and goals

Ricardo Gallart Selma (17 January 1907 – 6 November 1993) was a Spanish footballer who played as a forward for Espanyol and Real Oviedo, playing in the first-ever La Liga match of both clubs, and even scoring the first league goal in Oviedo's history.

He later worked as a manager, taking charge of several clubs in the Segunda División.

== Club career ==
=== Early career ===
Born in Barcelona on 17 January 1907, (Note: Some sources wrongly state that he was born on 22 January 1908.) Gallart began his footballing career in the youth ranks of his hometown club FC Espanya de Barcelona, where he won a youth tournament in Mataró organized by Iluro SC, which brought together the best teams in the province.

=== RCD Espanyol ===
In 1925, Gallart moved to Gràcia FC and UE Sants, from where he arrived at RCD Español, then under the command of Jack Greenwell, who, knowing that he was ending his contract, anticipated the intentions of CE Europa, which was close to acquiring his services. He played as an inside right and, although small in stature, he was a player of great technical quality and great ability to score goals.

Gallart was a member of the Espanyol team that won the 1928–29 Catalan championship and the 1929 Copa del Rey, although he did not play in the final. On 10 February 1929, Gallart went down in history as one of the eleven footballers who played in the very first La Liga match in the club's history, helping his side to a 3–2 victory over Real Unión. He scored his first goal for the club in the form of a hat-trick against Athletic Bilbao on 5 May 1929. In the following year, on 5 March, he scored one in the famous 8–1 trashing of Real Madrid.

=== Real Oviedo ===
At the start of the 1930–31 season, Gallart lost relevance with the arrival of Patricio Caicedo, so he was transferred to Real Oviedo for the not inconsiderable figure of 40,000 pesetas, making his debut in a Second Division match against Sporting de Gijón at the El Molinón on 14 December 1930, just a week after Isidro Lángara's own debut with Oviedo. He quickly established himself as an undisputed starter, and together with Lángara, Casuco, Galé, and Inciarte, he was a member of the famous Oviedo attacking quintet of the early 1930s that became known in Spanish football as the Delantera Eléctrica ("Electric Forward"), which was crucial in helping the team achieve promotion in 1932–33, thus becoming the first team from Asturias to do so. During that season, he scored a total of 7 goals in 12 league matches.

On 5 November 1933, Gallart scored Oviedo's first-ever goal in the First Division, thus helping his side to a historic 7–3 victory over FC Barcelona, which still is the best La Liga debut of a team promoted from the Second Division. He was also a member of the second version of the Delantera Eléctrica, formed by Casuco, Gallart, Lángara, Herrerita, and Emilín.

=== Later career ===
Gallart stayed loyal to Oviedo for 13 years, between 1930 and 1943, sept for the years of the Spanish Civil War, in which he played some friendly matches with Espanyol and then one season on loan for Racing de Ferrol (1939–40) because Real Oviedo could not participate in the league that season due to its stadium being badly damaged during the war. In total, he scored 29 goals in 107 La Liga matches for Espanyol and Oviedo, including 58 goals in 186 official matches for Real Oviedo.

Gallart then went to Lugo to join SG Lucense as a player-coach, a role that he replicated at UD Orensana before making a foray into Portuguese football at Flaviense de Chaves, where he retired in 1950.

== International career ==
=== Catalonia ===
On 26 September 1926, Gallart made his debut with the Catalan national team against Sabadell FC at Creu Alta in a tribute match to Francisco Cabedo, scoring once in a 4–3 win. In May 1927, first against Castilla on the 15th, and then against the Welsh club Swansea on the 29th, in which he scored an equalizer in a 1–1 draw. On 10 July 1927, he played against his future club Espanyol in a tribute match to Casimiro Mallorquí and José Maria Canals that ended in a 1–4 loss.

Gallart had to wait two years until his next match with Catalonia on 12 May 1929 against FC Barcelona, in a tribute match to that ended in a 1–2 loss. Two years later, on 9 August 1931, he scored once in a tribute match to Jesús Pedret to help Catalonia to a 5–2 win.

=== Spain (unofficial) ===
In 1932, Gallart was called up to the Spain national team for a friendly match against Yugoslavia on 24 April on the occasion of the inauguration of the Buenavista stadium, but while his teammate Lángara debuted, Gallart did not play. On 14 February 1934, he played for an unofficial Spanish team in a friendly against Catalonia, helping his side to a 2–0, with goals from his Oviedo teammates Casuco and Lángara.

During the Civil War, General Franco saw the opportunity to use football as a positive propaganda tool, so he arranged for a match to be played in his home region of Galicia against Portugal, whose leader Salazar was supportive of Francoist Spain. The match took place in Vigo in November 1937, but in contrast to Portugal's settled squad, the Spain pool was hastily assembled from the best available players in Nationalist areas, including Gallart, who scored his side's only goal in a 1–2 loss; the match was recognized by FIFA at the time, but currently is not.

== Managerial career ==
After his career as a player ended, Gallart remained linked to UD Orensana, now as a coach, which he oversaw in two stages (1948–49 and 1951–52). He also coached UD Tánger, Terrassa FC (1955–57), Hércules CF (1957–58), and Girona FC (1958–59), as well as UD Sitges, CF Balaguer, CF Amposta, Atlético Vallès, and UD Cassà. In 1967, he became the new manager of CE Mataró with the hopes of achieving promotion to the Third Division. He once stated that "My work is always the same [regardless of my team], since I believe that you must always work with the same enthusiasm, whether modest or powerful".

== Death ==
Gallart died in Barcelona on 6 November 1993, at the age of 86.

== Honours ==
Espanyol

- Catalan championship
  - Champions (1): 1928–29

Copa del Rey:

- Champions (1): 1929

Real Oviedo

- Segunda División
  - Champions (1): 1932–33
