= Juan Tena =

Spanish footballer (1899-1995)

Personal information
- Full name: Juan Tena Guimerà
- Date of birth: 9 March 1899
- Place of birth: Cabanes, Spain
- Date of death: 25 January 1995 (aged 95)
- Place of death: Barcelona, Spain
- Height: 1.67 m (5 ft 6 in)
- Position: Forward

Youth career
- 1917–1919: CE Sabadell

Senior career*
Years	Team	Apps	(Gls)
1919–1928	CE Sabadell		
1928–1930	Espanyol	25	(2)
1930–1931	CE Sabadell		
1931	Racing de Madrid		
1932	CE Sabadell		

International career
1921–1931	Catalonia	15	(0)

Managerial career
- 1930–1936: CE Sabadell
Medal record
Catalonia
Prince of Asturias Cup
Silver medal – second place	1926 Prince of Asturias Cup	Team
- * Club domestic league appearances and goals

Juan Tena Guimerà (9 March 1899 – 25 January 1995), also known as Tena I, was a Spanish footballer who played as a left midfielder. He also managed CE Sabadell for six years between 1930 and 1936.

== Club career ==
Born in Cabanes, he moved to Sabadell at the age of 6 due to family reasons. He joined the youth ranks of CE Sabadell in 1917, and two years later, he reached the first team, where he shared a dressing room with his younger brothers Francisco, known as Tena II, and Josep, known as Tena III. In March 1928, together with his brother Francisco and at the same time as Crisant Bosch and Julio Káiser, he signed for Espanyol. He played a pivotal role in helping the club to win the 1928-29 Catalonia championship and to reach the 1929 Copa del Rey Final, which they won after beating Real Madrid 2-1. In 1932 he returned briefly to Sabadell before ending his career.

== International career ==
He represented the Catalonia national team 15 times, but failed to score a single time. He was a member of the team that won the 1926 edition of the Prince of Asturias Cup, an inter-regional competition organized by the RFEF, helping Catalonia to a 6-3 aggregate victory over Asturias.

== Manegerial career ==
After retiring, he became a manager, leading CE Sabadell for six years between 1930 and 1936.
