= Ramón Trabal =

Spanish footballer

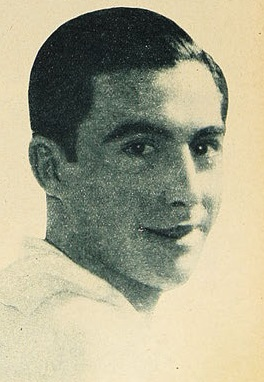
- Los Sports, 1926

Personal information
- Full name: Ramón Trabal Calvo Midfielder
- Date of birth: 20 September 1903
- Place of birth: Barcelona, Catalonia, Spain
- Date of death: 24 April 1947 (aged 43)
- Place of death: Barcelona, Spain
- Position: Midfielder

Youth career
- 1913–1922: Espanyol

Senior career*
Years	Team	Apps	(Gls)
1922–1933	Espanyol		

International career
1924-1932	Catalonia	6	(1)
Medal record
Catalonia
Prince of Asturias Cup
Silver medal – second place	1923-24 Prince of Asturias Cup	Team
- * Club domestic league appearances and goals

Ramón Trabal Calvo (20 September 1903 - 24 April 1947) was a Spanish footballer who played as a midfielder.

A historical member of Espanyol in the 1920s, he was one of the first footballers to play for Espanyol for his entire career, and thus to be part of the so-called one-club men group.

== Club career ==
Born in Barcelona, he began playing football in the lower categories of Espanyol, before making it to the first team in 1922, for whom he was a starter until his departure in 1933. He formed a brilliant midfield line with Pere Solé and Tena I. He played a pivotal role in helping the club to win the 1928-29 Catalonia championship and reach the 1929 Copa del Rey Final, which Espanyol won after beating Real Madrid 2-1.

After retiring, he became the club's first-team coach for two seasons. He was also one of the key figures in the club's survival during the Civil War. He died in 1947, at the age of 42, after a long illness.

== International career ==
Trabal never made it to the Spain national football team, but he played for the Catalonia national team, helping them win the 1923-24 Prince of Asturias Cup, an inter-regional competition organized by the RFEF. Trabal was a starter in the infamous final of the 1923-24 edition against a Castile/Madrid XI, which ended in a dramatic 4-4 draw; however, he did not play in the ensuing replay two days later where Catalonia came-out as 3-2 winners.

== Honours ==
=== Club ===
Espanyol

- Copa del Rey: 1929

=== International ===
Catalonia

- Prince of Asturias Cup: 1923-24 Prince of Asturias Cup
