= Juan José Estella =

Spanish footballer

Personal information
- Full name: Juan José Estella Salas
- Birth name: Joan Josep Estella i Salas
- Date of birth: 13 January 1956
- Place of birth: Sant Feliu de Llobregat, Barcelona, Spain
- Height: 1.78 m (5 ft 10 in)
- Position: Midfielder

Youth career
- 1967–1970: Sant Joan Despí
- 1970–1972: Barcelona U16
- 1972–1974: Barcelona U19
- 1974–1975: Barcelona Amateur

Senior career*
Years	Team	Apps	(Gls)
1975–1979	Barcelona Atlètic	30	(1)
1977–1978	→ Córdoba (on loan)	26	(1)
1978–1979	→ Real Valladolid (on loan)	31	(3)
1979–1983	Barcelona	74	(7)
1983–1984	Mallorca	19	(1)
1984–1985	Sabadell	24	(4)
1985–1986	Sevilla	21	(2)

International career
1982	Spain	1	(0)
- * Club domestic league appearances and goals

Juan José Estella Salas (13 January 1956) was a Spanish footballer who played as a midfielder for Barcelona, Mallorca, and Sevilla in the 1980s. He played one international match for Spain in 1982.

== Early life ==
Estella was born on 13 January 1956 in Sant Feliu de Llobregat, Barcelona. His childhood idols were Pelé, Johan Cruyff, and Julio César Benítez.

== Playing career ==
=== Club career ===
Estella began playing football in his hometown club Sant Joan Despí in 1967, aged 11, even though the minimum age to compete was twelve, so when he joined the youth ranks of FC Barcelona in 1970, after taking and passing the Barça tests, he did it so in falsified form. At Camp Nou, he played for the U16 side, Juvenil (U19), and the Amateur Barça teams for a total of five years, until 1975. When he was a member of the Amateur team, the coaches very seriously considered the possibility of releasing him because there were doubts about his qualities.

In 1975, Estella made his senior debut with Barcelona Atlètic, where he remained for four seasons until 1979, playing the latter two seasons on loan to Córdoba and Real Valladolid, all of which in the Segunda División. He went to Córdoba because he had had to do his military service there. He stood out at Valladolid, becoming a highly valued player sought after by the big clubs, including Real Madrid and Atlético Madrid, but in the end, he chose to stay loyal to Barça. In 1979, Estella finally made his debut for the first team of Barcelona, which was given to him by the hands of the then Barça coach Joaquim Rifé. He remained at Barça until 1983, playing as a full-back and midfielder for a total of 147 matches, and helping his side win two Copas del Rey titles (1980–81 and 1982–83), the 1981–82 European Cup Winners' Cup, and the 1983 Copa de la Liga. He once played against Real with an anesthetized leg.

Between 1983 and 1986, Estella played for three different clubs, one season each: Mallorca, Sabadell, and Sevilla. During his last season of football with Sevilla, on 4 September 1985, in a league fixture against Osasuna, he scored after dribbling half of the rival team and entering the goal with the ball under control; some of the Sevilla supporters who were present labeled it "the goal of the century".

When his father got sick in 1986, Estella began to travel to Barcelona every week, which naturally affected his training time at Seville, so he decided to terminate the contract and subsequently retired, aged only 30. Throughout his entire club career, he scored 19 goals in 229 matches.

=== International career ===
On 24 March 1982, Estella earned his first (and only) international cap for Spain in a friendly match against Wales at the Mestalla Stadium in Valencia, which ended in a 1–1 draw. He was initially named to the Spanish squad of the 1982 FIFA World Cup held in Spain, but he was left off at the last minute for unknown reasons.

== Later life ==
After retiring, Estella opened a hospitality business and frequently traveled to Barcelona to participate in the events of Agrupació Barça Jugadors (ABJ).

== Honours ==
Barcelona

- Copa del Rey:
  - Champions (2): 1980–81 and 1982–83
- European Cup Winners' Cup:
  - Champions (1): 1981–82
- Copa de la Liga:
  - Champions (1): 1983

== See also ==
- List of Catalan footballers
