= Julio Káiser =

Spanish footballer (1903–1954)

Personal information
- Full name: Julio José Román Kaiser Masdeu
- Birth name: Juli Kaiser i Masdeu
- Date of birth: 8 January 1903
- Place of birth: Barcelona, Catalonia, Spain
- Date of death: 29 April 1954 (aged 51)
- Place of death: Veracruz, Mexico
- Positions: Defender; midfielder

Senior career*
Years	Team	Apps	(Gls)
1922–1923	Catalunya de Badalona		
1923–1924	Catalonia de les Corts		
1924–1926	Terrassa FC		
1926–1930	RCD Espanyol		
1930–1931	CF Badalona		

Managerial career
- 1946–1947: Moctezuma de Orizaba
- * Club domestic league appearances and goals

Julio José Román Kaiser Masdeu (8 January 1903 – 29 April 1954) was a Spanish footballer who played as a defender and midfielder for RCD Espanyol and CF Badalona. He later became a manager in Mexico, guiding Moctezuma de Orizaba to the Copa México title in 1947.

== Playing career ==
Julio Kaiser was born on 8 January 1903 in Barcelona, Catalonia. (Note: Some sources wrongly state that he was born in 1906.) After playing for a few years in his hometown teams, Catalunya de Badalona (1922–23), Catalonia de les Corts (1923–24), and Terrassa FC (1924–26), Kaiser was signed by Espanyol in September 1926. Despite being a midfielder of short stature and rather limited technique, Kaiser compensated for these shortcomings with a contagious and tireless fighting spirit that made him highly valued by the coaches and loved by the Espanyol fans.

Of the four seasons he played at Espanyol, Kaiser was the undisputed starter in the first two, but his situation changed with the arrival of Juan Tena from Sabadell, who together with Ramón Trabal and Pedro Solé, ended up creating a successful midfield line. Despite the difficulty of finding a place among them, he stayed loyal to the club and remained on the lookout, being always prepared for any eventuality, such as the 1929 Copa del Rey final in Valencia, when the sanction against Tena for his expulsion at the semifinal against FC Barcelona in Les Corts forced the team to rework. In the final, he helped his side to a 2–1 victory over Madrid FC. In total, he played 46 matches with the club, 31 in the Catalan championship, 6 in the Copa del Rey, and 9 in the inaugural La Liga season in 1929.

After the 1929–30 season, Kaiser signed for CF Badalona, and in 1939, after the Spanish Civil War, he went into exile in Mexico, boarding the steamship Mèxique heading to Veracruz.

== Later life and death ==
In 1947, Káiser was coach of the Unión Deportiva Moctezuma de Orizaba, which he led to the Copa México title in 1947.

Káiser died on 29 April 1954, at the age of 51.

== Honours ==
=== Player ===
Espanyol

- Catalan championship: 1928–29
- Copa del Rey: 1929

=== Coach ===
Moctezuma de Orizaba

- Copa México: 1947
