= Campo Municipal de Gobela =

Stadium in Getxo, Spain

Estadio Nuevo Municipal de Gobela
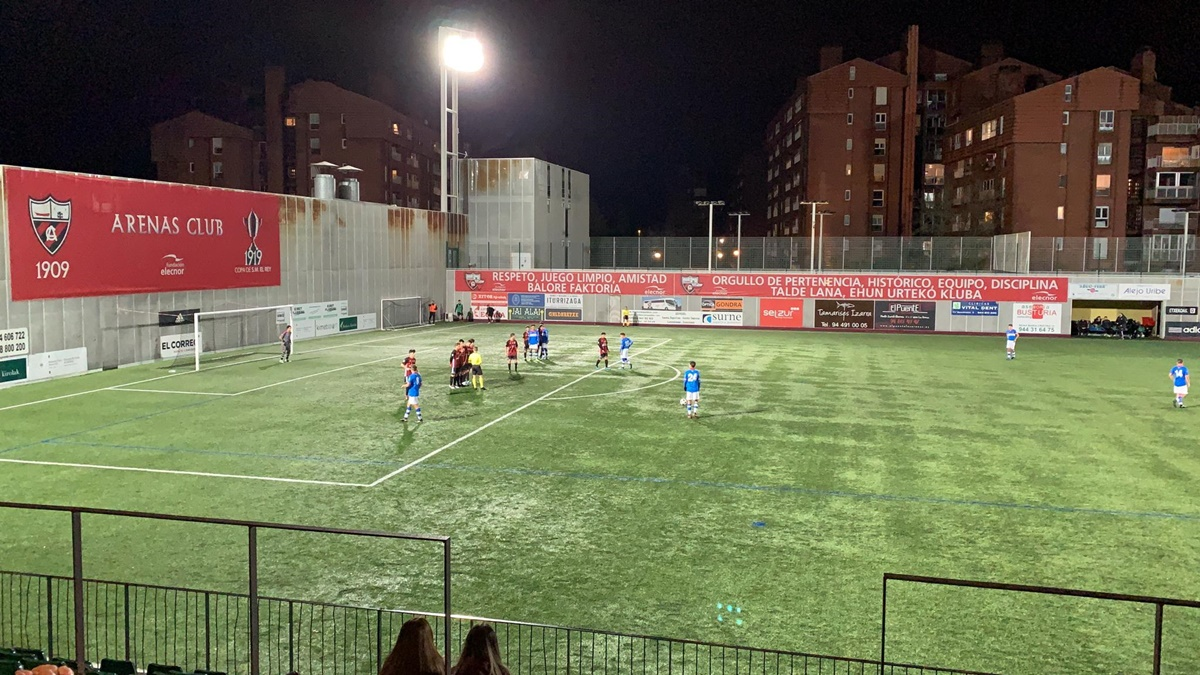
- Interactive map of Estadio Nuevo Municipal de Gobela
- Full name: Estadio Nuevo Municipal de Gobela
- Former names: Estadio Municipal de Gobela (1947—2004)
- Location: Getxo, Spain
- Coordinates: 43°19′53.29″N 3°0′23.28″W
- Owner: Arenas Club de Getxo
- Capacity: 2,000
- Surface: artificial turf

Construction
- Built: 1947
- Opened: 27 September 1947 (0-0 vs Osasuna)
- Renovated: 2004
- Architect: Ander Marquet Ryan (2004 Renovation)

Tenant
- Arenas Club de Getxo

Campo Municipal de Gobela is the home stadium of Arenas Club de Getxo, Getxo with a 2,000 capacity.

== History ==
Arenas played at the Campo de Ibaiondo between September 1925 & May 1943. They were forced to sell the Campo de Ibaiondo and played at a number of stadiums in the Bilbao area over the next four seasons. The Campo de Gobela opened on 27 September 1947 with a league fixture against CA Osasuna (0-0). The stadium was rebuilt in 2004.

== Links ==
- Estadios de España (in English)
