= Mariano de Mur =

Spanish footballer (1909–1936)

Personal information
- Full name: Mariano de Mur Cirera
- Date of birth: 9 October 1909
- Place of birth: Sabadell, Spain
- Date of death: 21 August 1936 (aged 26)
- Place of death: Graus, Spain
- Position: Defender

Senior career*
Years	Team	Apps	(Gls)
1928–1929	UE Sants		
1929–1931	Espanyol		
1931–1932	Vilafranca	48	(4)
1932–1933	UE Sants	23	(0)
1933	Huesca		

International career
1930–1932	Catalonia	3	(0)
- * Club domestic league appearances and goals

Mariano de Mur Cirera (9 October 1909 – 21 August 1936) was a Spanish footballer who played as a defender for Espanyol in the 1930s. His brother Ignacio also played football, but for CE Europa.

== Club career ==
Born on 9 October 1909 in Sabadell, de Mur began his football career at his hometown club UE Sants in 1928, aged 19, where he was known as Ben-Hur. In 1929, he was signed by Espanyol, with whom he played for two seasons, scoring 1 goal in 23 official matches, including 3 in the Catalan championship, 7 in the Copa del Rey, and 13 in La Liga. He featured in Espanyol's historic 4–0 and 8–1 victories over Barcelona and Real Madrid in early 1930s.

After leaving Espanyol, de Mur played one season at Vilafranca (1931–32), where he showed "excellent form", but despite receiving several offers, he decided to return to Sants, where he also played for one season, before retiring at Huesca in 1933, aged only 24.

== International career ==
de Mur was eligible to play for the Catalan national team, making his debut on 8 June 1930, starting in a friendly match against the Basque Country national team at Montjuïc, which ended in a 1–0 loss. Two weeks later, on 22 June, he played a tribute match to Rini in Zaragoza, which ended in a 3–1 loss. On 16 May 1932, he earned his third and last cap for Catalonia in a tribute match to Carles Oliveras against his former club Sants, helping his side to a 2–0 win.

== Death ==
Outside football, he was a commercial expert. On 21 August 1936, just a month after the outbreak of the Spanish Civil War, De Mur was imprisoned, tried, and shot by the republican repression in Graus.
