= Daniel Mejías =

Andorran footballer (1982–2022)

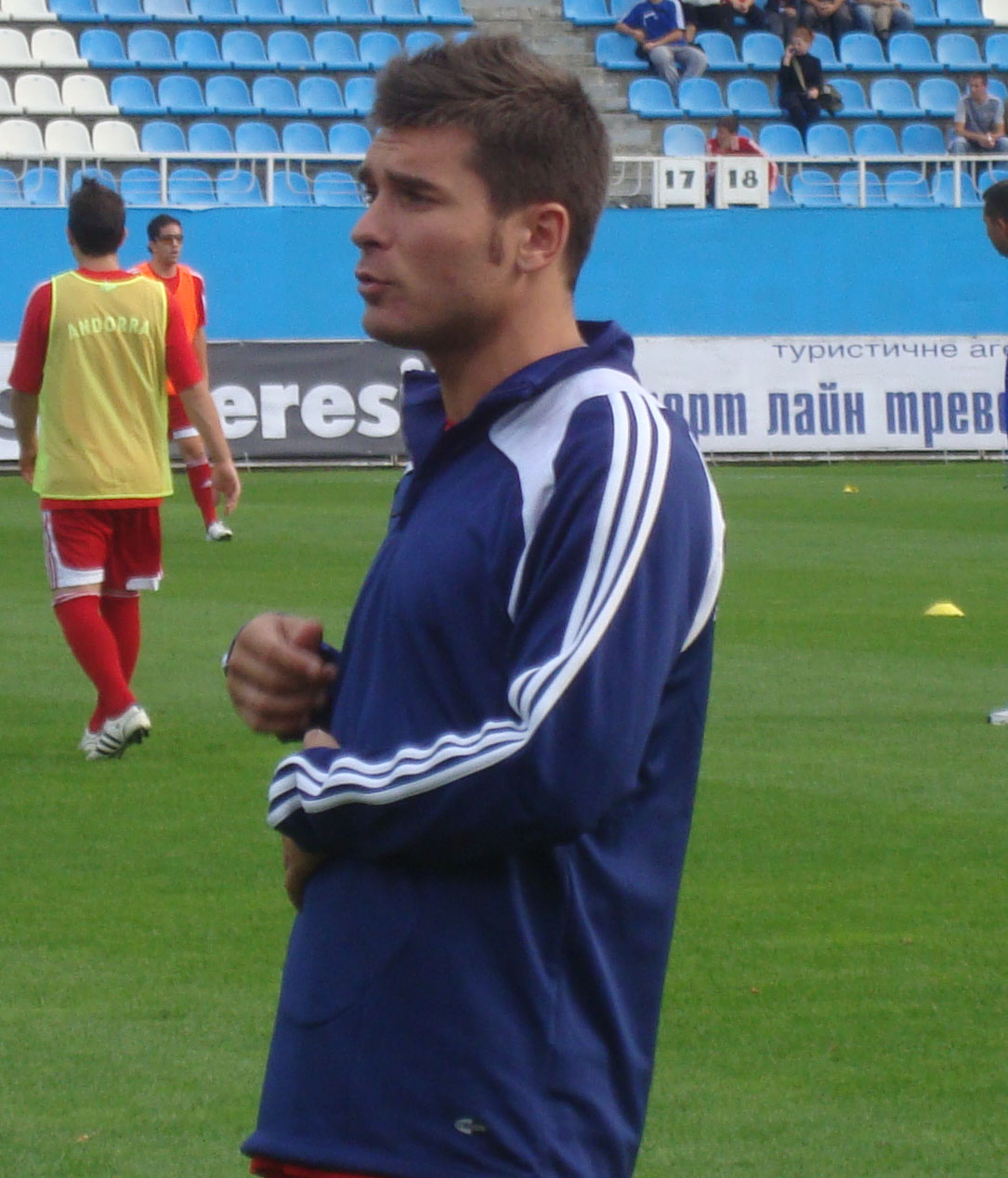
- Mejías with Andorra

Personal information
- Full name: Daniel Mejías Hurtado
- Date of birth: 26 July 1982
- Place of birth: Barcelona, Spain
- Date of death: 8 November 2022 (aged 40)
- Position: Midfielder

Youth career
- Barcelona

Senior career*
| Years | Team | Apps | (Gls) |
| 2000 | Barcelona C | 1 | (0) |
| 2000–2001 | Sporting Gijón B | | |
| 2001–2002 | Montijo | | |
| 2002–2003 | Díter Zafra | 22 | (0) |
| 2003 | Villanueva | | |
| 2003–2004 | Montijo | | |
| 2004 | Peralada | | |
| 2004–2005 | Cuenca | | |
| 2005–2006 | Guadix | 8 | (1) |
| 2006 | Moralo | | |
| 2006–2007 | Villafranca | | |
| 2007–2008 | Sporting Villanueva | | |
| 2008–2009 | Sant Julià | | |
| 2009–2014 | FC Andorra | 99 | (13) |
| 2014–2015 | Ordino | 9 | (1) |
| 2015–2016 | Lusitanos | 10 | (0) |
| 2016–2017 | Inter Club d'Escaldes | 8 | (1) |
| 2017–2018 | Penya d'Andorra | 3 | (0) |
| 2018–2019 | Lusitanos | 1 | (0) |
| 2020–2021 | CF Atlètic Amèrica | | |

International career
| 2010–2012 | Andorra | 5 | (0) |
- * Club domestic league appearances and goals

Daniel Mejías Hurtado (26 July 1982 – 8 November 2022) was an Andorran footballer who played as a midfielder. He made five appearances for the Andorra national team, having made his international debut in 2010.

Mejías died on 8 November 2022, aged 40.
