= 1929 Copa del Rey final =

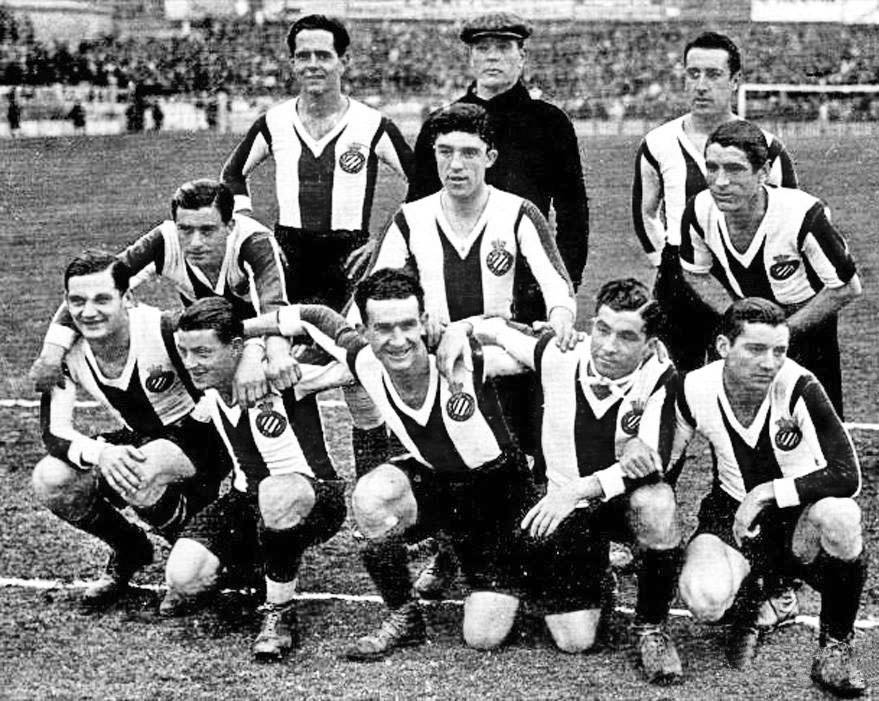
- RCD Español, champions
- Event: 1929 Copa del Rey
RCD Español	Real Madrid
2	1
- Date: 3 February 1929
- Venue: Mestalla, Valencia
- Referee: Pelayo Serrano
- Attendance: 25,000

The 1929 Copa del Rey final was the 29th final of the Copa del Rey, the Spanish football cup competition. RCD Español beat Real Madrid 2–1 and won their first title.

== Match details ==
3 February 1929
15:00 CET

RCD Español	2–1	Real Madrid
Tena II 55'; Bosch 70'	Report	Lazcano 75'

Mestalla, Valencia
Attendance: 25,000
Referee: Pelayo Serrano

RCD Español	Real Madrid

GK	1	(Spain) Ricardo Zamora
DF	2	(El Salvador) Ricardo Saprissa
DF	3	(Spain) Rafael González
MF	4	(Spain) Ramón Trabal
MF	5	(Spain) Pedro Solé
MF	6	(Spain) Julio Káiser
FW	7	(Spain) Martín Vantolrá
FW	8	(Spain) Domingo Broto
FW	9	(Spain) Francisco Tena
FW	10	(Spain) José Padrón
FW	11	(Spain) Crisant Bosch
Manager:
(England) Jack Greenwell

GK	1	(Spain) José Cabo
DF	2	(Spain) Félix Quesada
DF	3	(Spain) Juan Urquizu
MF	4	(Spain) Pachuco Prats
MF	5	(Spain) Desiderio Esparza
MF	6	(Spain) José María Peña
FW	7	(Spain) Jaime Lazcano
FW	8	(Spain) Monchín Triana
FW	9	(Spain) Gaspar Rubio
FW	10	(Spain) Rafael Morera
FW	11	(Spain) Francisco López
Manager:
(Spain) José Quirante

Copa del Rey 1929 winners
RCD Español
1st title
