= Francisco Tena (footballer, born 1901) =

Spanish footballer

Personal information
- Full name: Francisco Tena Guimerà
- Date of birth: 29 September 1901
- Place of birth: Cabanes, Spain
- Date of death: 6 August 1954 (aged 52)
- Place of death: Barcelona, Spain
- Position: Forward

Senior career*
Years	Team	Apps	(Gls)
1920–1928	CE Sabadell		
1928–1931	RCD Espanyol	26	(8)
1931	CE Sabadell		

International career
	Catalonia	8	(1)
- * Club domestic league appearances and goals

Francisco Tena Guimerà (29 September 1901 - 6 August 1954), also known as Tena II, was a Spanish footballer who played as a forward for RCD Espanyol.

== Club career ==
Born in Cabanes, he moved to Sabadell at a very young age for family reasons. In 1920 he joined the first team of CE Sabadell, where he shared a dressing room with his brothers Juan (Tena I) and Josep (Tena III), and thus, in order to avoid confusion, they started appearing as Tena I, II and III on the scoreboards. In March 1928, together with his brother Juan and at the same time as Crisant Bosch and Julio Káiser, he signed for Espanyol. He played a pivotal role in helping the club to win the 1928–29 Catalonia championship and reach the 1929 Copa del Rey Final, in which he scored the opening goal of an 2–1 win over Real Madrid, thus contributing decisively to the first-ever Copa del Rey title in the history of Espanyol. In 1931 he returned briefly to Sabadell before ending his career.

== International career ==
He represented the Catalonia national team 8 times, scoring once, in a 9–0 win over a representing team of Brussels on 16 June 1927.
