= Ricardo Saprissa =

Spanish sportsman (1901-1990)

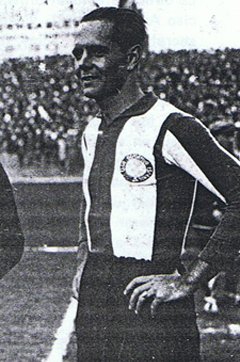
- Saprissa playing for Español

Personal information
- Full name: Ricardo Juan Antonio Saprissa Aymá
- Date of birth: 24 June 1901
- Place of birth: San Salvador, El Salvador
- Date of death: 16 August 1990 (aged 89)
- Place of death: Alajuela, Costa Rica
- Position: Defender

Senior career*
Years	Team	Apps	(Gls)
1922–1932	Espanyol	50	(1)
1932	Orión	7	(2)
Total		57	(3)

International career
1925–1931	Catalonia	5	(1)

Managerial career
- 1935–1938: Costa Rica
- 1938: Orión
- 1951: Costa Rica
- * Club domestic league appearances and goals

Ricardo Juan Antonio Saprissa Aymá (24 June 1901 – 16 August 1990) was a lifelong athlete, coach, and promoter of sports. After being raised in El Salvador, he spent many years in Costa Rica, playing and coaching football. In 1935 he was co-founder of Deportivo Saprissa, a highly successful football team based in San Juan de Tibás. He also represented Spain at the 1924 Summer Olympics.

== Early life ==
Born in El Salvador to Spanish parents, Saprissa moved to Barcelona (his mother's home town) as a small child but returned to El Salvador aged 10 after the death of his father. After completing his studies in engineering, he returned to Spain in 1922 to play soccer.

== Sporting career as a player ==
He played several sports, excelling at football as well as in baseball, tennis, field hockey and polo. He joined the football club RCD Espanyol, and won the national cup competition (Copa del Rey) with the club in 1929 (along with the Catalan football championship in the same season). That made him the first Salvadorean soccer player to play professionally in Spain, and the only Salvadorean player to win a Copa del Rey.

He also won Spain's field hockey national championship in 1924 and the national tennis doubles championship in 1923 and 1924.

Since El Salvador did not participate in the Paris Summer Olympic Games in 1924, he represented Spain in men's and mixed doubles tennis and was on the Spanish team in the equivalent of the Davis Cup in 1930. He moved to San José, Costa Rica, in 1932.

== Costa Rica and Deportivo Saprissa ==
Saprissa became the coach and president of the local football team, Orión, guiding them to a championship in 1938. He coached Costa Rica's national football team, winning the silver medal at the 1935 and 1938 Central American and Caribbean Games, and in the 1951 Pan American Games in Buenos Aires.

Later that decade, Roberto Fernández started a boys football team, with children from all over San José. He asked Saprissa if he could supply the player's uniforms. He did, and the team became known as Deportivo Saprissa. The team successfully competed in local tournaments. As the young players started to grow, the team began to compete in higher categories. They reached Costa Rica's First Division in 1949, and have since won more national and international tournaments than any other Costa Rican team. They represented CONCACAF at the 2005 FIFA Club World Championship in Japan in December 2005, winning third place in the tournament.

Saprissa was the president of Deportivo Saprissa from 1948 to 1981. In 1972, one of his dreams was realised when the team became the first in Costa Rica to have its own stadium, which was named after him.

== Death and legacy ==
Don Ricardo Saprissa died in Alajuela in August 1990. Among his distinctions, Saprissa was included in Costa Rica's Sports Gallery in 1969 and was named honorary president of Barcelona's Espanyol, Costa Rica's Orion, Gimnástica Española in Spain, and rival soccer team Alajuelense in Costa Rica. The Estadio Ricardo Saprissa Aymá in San José is named for him.
