= 1928–29 Campionat de Catalunya =

Campionat de Catalunya
- Season: 1928–29
- Champions: Espanyol
- Relegated: Sabadell; Terrassa
- Matches: 30
- Goals: 110 (3.67 per match)
- Top goalscorer: Manuel Cros (12 goals)
- Biggest home win: Espanyol 7–0 Terrassa (4 November 1928); Europa 7–0 Terrassa (25 November 1928)
- Biggest away win: Sabadell 0–5 Barcelona (7 October 1928)
- Highest scoring: Espanyol 7–0 Terrassa (4 November 1928); Europa 7–0 Terrassa (25 November 1928)

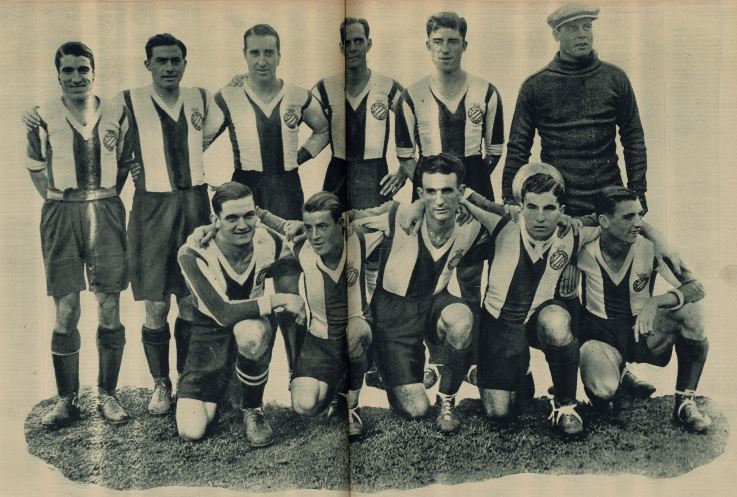
The Espanyol team, champion of Campionat de Catalunya 1928–29.

The 1928–29 Campionat de Catalunya season was the 30th since its establishment and was played between 30 September and 2 December 1928.

== Overview before the season ==
Six teams joined the Division One league, including three that would play the 1929 La Liga:

- Barcelona
- Espanyol
- Europa

== Division One ==
=== League table ===
Pos	Team	Pld	W	D	L	GF	GA	GD	Pts	Qualification or relegation
1	Espanyol (C)	10	9	1	0	32	4	+28	19	Qualification for Copa del Rey
2	Europa	10	4	5	1	23	8	+15	13	Qualification for Copa del Rey
3	Barcelona	10	5	2	3	23	13	+10	12	Qualification for Copa del Rey
4	Sants (O)	10	3	2	5	18	20	−2	8	Qualification for the play-off league
5	Sabadell (R)	10	2	1	7	6	30	−24	5	Qualification for the play-off league
6	Terrassa (R)	10	1	1	8	8	35	−27	3	Qualification for the play-off league

Source: BDFútbol
Rules for classification: 1) points; 2) head-to-head points; 3) head-to-head goal difference; 4) goal difference; 5) number of goals scored
(C) Champions; (O) Play-off winners; (R) Relegated

=== Results ===
Home \ Away	FCB	ESP	EUR	SAB	STS	TER
Barcelona	—	0–2	0–2	4–1	2–1	3–1
Espanyol	2–1	—	0–0	5–0	5–1	7–0
Europa	2–2	0–1	—	5–1	1–1	7–0
Sabadell	0–5	1–4	1–1	—	1–0	1–0
Sants	2–2	1–3	0–3	4–0	—	4–1
Terrassa	0–4	0–3	2–2	2–0	2–4	—

Source: BDFútbol
Legend: Blue = home team win; Yellow = draw; Red = away team win.

=== Top goalscorers ===
Goalscorers	Goals	Team
(Spain) Manuel Cros	12	Europa
(Spain) Domingo Broto	9	Espanyol
(Spain) Francisco Tena	8	Espanyol
(Spain) Ángel Arocha	6	Barcelona
(Spain) Juan Miró	6	Sants

== Play-off league ==
Pos	Team	Pld	W	D	L	GF	GA	GD	Pts	Qualification or relegation
1	Badalona (C, P)	18	12	3	3	51	30	+21	27	Play-off winners
2	Júpiter (P)	18	12	2	4	34	24	+10	26	Play-off winners
3	Sants	18	11	3	4	41	19	+22	25	Play-off winners
4	Sabadell	18	9	6	3	35	25	+10	24	
5	Manresa	18	9	1	8	44	25	+19	19	
6	Palafrugell	18	7	2	9	43	43	0	16	
7	Martinenc	18	7	2	9	38	47	−9	16	
8	Terrassa	18	5	3	10	32	44	−12	13	
9	Sant Andreu	18	4	5	9	24	28	−4	13	
10	Gràcia	18	0	1	17	9	66	−57	1	

Source: BDFútbol
Rules for classification: 1) points; 2) head-to-head points; 3) head-to-head goal difference; 4) goal difference; 5) number of goals scored
(C) Champions; (P) Promoted

== Division Two ==
=== Group A ===
Pos	Team	Pld	W	D	L	GF	GA	GD	Pts	Qualification or relegation
1	Manresa	6	4	1	1	17	7	+10	9	Qualification for play-off league
2	Gimnàstic Tarragona	6	2	2	2	11	12	−1	6	Qualification for repechage
3	Alumnes Obrers	6	2	1	3	9	14	−5	5	
4	Lleida	6	1	2	3	10	14	−4	4	Qualification for the relegation play-off

Source: BDFútbol
Rules for classification: 1) points; 2) head-to-head points; 3) head-to-head goal difference; 4) goal difference; 5) number of goals scored

=== Group B ===
Pos	Team	Pld	W	D	L	GF	GA	GD	Pts	Qualification or relegation
1	Sant Andreu	6	4	1	1	12	9	+3	9	Qualification for play-off league
2	Júpiter	6	4	0	2	13	7	+6	8	Qualification for play-off league
3	Martinenc	6	3	1	2	15	13	+2	7	Qualification for repechage
4	Gràcia	6	0	0	6	2	13	−11	0	Qualification for the relegation play-off

Source: BDFútbol
Rules for classification: 1) points; 2) head-to-head points; 3) head-to-head goal difference; 4) goal difference; 5) number of goals scored

=== Group C ===
Pos	Team	Pld	W	D	L	GF	GA	GD	Pts	Qualification or relegation
1	Badalona	6	4	0	2	20	8	+12	8	Qualification for play-off league
2	Palafrugell	6	3	0	3	7	8	−1	6	Qualification for repechage
3	Iluro	6	2	1	3	7	13	−6	5	
4	Atlètic Sabadell	6	2	1	3	8	13	−5	5	Qualification for the relegation play-off

Source: BDFútbol
Rules for classification: 1) points; 2) head-to-head points; 3) head-to-head goal difference; 4) goal difference; 5) number of goals scored

=== Repechage ===
Pos	Team	Pld	W	D	L	GF	GA	GD	Pts	Qualification or relegation
1	Palafrugell	2	2	0	0	9	5	+4	4	Qualification for play-off league
2	Martinenc	2	1	0	1	5	5	0	2	Qualification for play-off league
3	Gimnàstic Tarragona	2	0	0	2	3	7	−4	0	

Source: BDFútbol
Rules for classification: 1) points; 2) head-to-head points; 3) head-to-head goal difference; 4) goal difference; 5) number of goals scored

=== Relegation playoff ===
Team 1	Agg.	Team 2	1st leg	2nd leg
Artiguense Llevant	0–1	Gràcia	0–0	0–1
Girona	3–4	Atlètic Sabadell	2–3	1–1
Santboià	3–0	Lleida	3–0	0–0
