= Jack Greenwell =

English footballer and manager (1884–1942)

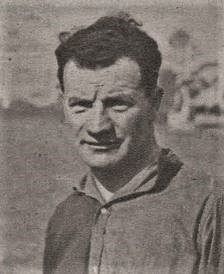
- Greenwell during his time as manager of Español in 1929

Personal information
- Full name: John Richard Greenwell
- Date of birth: 2 January 1884
- Place of birth: Crook, County Durham, England
- Date of death: 20 November 1942 (aged 58)
- Place of death: Bogotá, Colombia
- Position: Wing-half

Senior career*
Years	Team	Apps	(Gls)
1901–1912	Crook Town		
1912–1916	Barcelona	88	(10)

Managerial career
- 1913–1923: Barcelona
- 1923–1926: UE Sants
- 1926–1928: CD Castellón
- 1928–1930: Español
- 1930–1931: Real Sociedad Alfonso XIII
- 1931–1933: Barcelona
- 1933–1934: Valencia
- 1935–1936: Sporting de Gijón
- 1939–1940: Universitario de Deportes
- 1939–1940: Peru
- 1942: Independiente Santa Fe
- * Club domestic league appearances and goals

John Richard Greenwell (2 January 1884 – 20 November 1942) was an English football manager and player. He is Barcelona's longest serving manager, having coached the club for ten consecutive seasons (initially as player-coach, then as manager), later returning to coach for two more seasons in the 1930s. In 1939, Greenwell became the only non-South American coach to date to win the South American Championship when he guided Peru to their first win. He also served as a manager with CD Castellón, RCD Español, Valencia CF, Sporting de Gijón, Real Sociedad Alfonso XIII, Universitario de Deportes, and Independiente Santa Fe.

== Playing career ==
Jack Greenwell was born in Crook, County Durham, on 2 January 1884. The son of a miner, he became a miner himself after leaving school and played as a wing-half for Crook Town of the English Northern League from the age of 17. He also played with West Auckland Town as a guest player in their Sir Thomas Lipton Trophy success in 1909.

He made his debut as player for Barcelona on 29 September 1912 in a 4–2 win over FC Espanya de Barcelona. Following the departure of Jack Alderson, Greenwell became the club's new player-coach. In 1913, Greenwell arranged for his former team Crook Town to play a series of games against Barcelona. The visiting English team beat them 4–2 and then held them to 1–1 and 2–2 draws. Together with a very young Paulino Alcántara, Francisco Bru and Romà Forns, Greenwell subsequently helped Barcelona win the Catalan championship in 1912–13 and 1915–16.

== Managerial career ==
=== In Spain ===
After retiring as a player, he was appointed manager of Barcelona by the club president, Joan Gamper, and made his managerial debut on 7 July 1917 in a 3–1 win over CE Europa. He would eventually take charge of the club for 492 games and coached the club during their first "golden age". He survived early calls for his resignation after experimenting with Alcántara as a defender and went on to lead the club to four Campionats de Catalunya and two Copas del Rey. As well as Alcántara, the Barça team under Greenwell also included Sagibarba, Ricardo Zamora, Josep Samitier, Félix Sesúmaga and Ferenc Plattkó. At Barcelona, Greenwell was noted for his innovative approach to tactics, focussing on developing a passing game and building attacks from the back rather than concentrating on dribbling past opponents.

After leaving Barcelona in 1923, Greenwell became the inaugural manager of UE Sants, a club based in the Sants district of Barcelona. During his three seasons with the club, he helped them stave off relegation in his first season, and finish third in the league in his last season, while also finally prevailing over his former team. Greenwell then joined CD Castellón, who played in the Campeonato Regional de Valencia. In the 1926–27 season, the club finished as runners-up, and the following season, they repeated the same feat, but Greenwell did not see the season out as he moved mid-season to Barcelona's local rivals Español. In 1928, he led them into the inaugural La Liga, but the club only managed to finish seventh. However, Español made up for their disappointing league form by winning both the Campionat de Catalunya and their first ever Copa del Rey in 1929. With a team that included Zamora and Ricardo Saprissa, Greenwell guided Español through the early rounds, beating Sporting de Gijón and Arenas Club de Getxo. In the quarter-finals, they beat Athletic Madrid 9–3 on aggregate, before beating eventual La Liga champions Barcelona 3–1 in the semi-finals and Real Madrid 2–1 in the final. Greenwell remained in charge of Español for one more season, but failed to win another trophy. He then spent a season with Real Sociedad Alfonso XIII, where the club retained the Baleares Championship.

Greenwell returned to Barcelona for two further seasons in 1931, and guided the club to a fifth Campionat de Catalunya in 1931–32. After leaving Barcelona for a second time, Greenwell joined Valencia for the 1933–34 season. The club only finished seventh in La Liga but won the Campeonato de Valencia and reached the Copa de España final. The game saw Greenwell face old acquaintances Samitier and Zamora, now playing for Real Madrid. The Madrid club, at the time known as Madrid CF, beat Valencia 2–1 in the final. The 1935–36 season would prove to be the last time he managed a Spanish club, finishing in the Segunda División with Sporting de Gijón and missing out on promotion to La Liga.

=== In South America ===
Greenwell, along with his English wife Doris (née Rubinstien), fled the Spanish Civil War. After briefly coaching in Turkey, he went to Peru in 1939, as manager of both Universitario de Deportes and the Peruvian national team. He coached Universitario as they won the national championship. The same year saw Peru host the South American Championship. Colombia, Argentina, Bolivia and Brazil all withdrew before the competition started, so the remaining five countries, Chile, Ecuador, Paraguay, Uruguay and Peru formed a single mini-league with each team playing all the others once. Uruguay and Peru both won their first three games so when they met in the final round, the game was effectively a final. Peru won 2–1 and became South American champions.

In 1940, Greenwell moved to the Colombian port city of Barranquilla, and worked with the Colombia national team in their build-up to the 1942 Central American and Caribbean Games. However, the city's games were postponed due to the worsening political situation during World War II, eventually being held in 1946.

In 1942, he joined Independiente Santa Fe, with whom he reached the finals of the Torneo de Cundinamarca (at the time there was no First Division in Colombia), which the team lost against América de Cali. Later that year, he died there of a heart attack whilst driving home from a training session. He was survived by his wife and their daughter, Carmen.

== Honours ==
=== As player ===
Crook Town

- Crook and District League: 1902

West Auckland

- Sir Thomas Lipton Trophy: 1909

Barcelona

- Campionat de Catalunya: 1912–13, 1915–16

=== As manager ===
Barcelona

- Copa del Rey: 1920, 1922
- Campionat de Catalunya: 1918–19, 1919–20, 1920–21, 1921–22, 1931–32

RCD Español

- Copa del Rey: 1928–29
- Campionat de Catalunya: 1928–29

Real Sociedad Alfonso XIII

- Baleares Championship: 1930–31

Valencia CF

- Campeonato de Valencia: 1933–34

Universitario

- Peruvian Primera División: 1939

Peru

- South American Championship: 1939
- Bolivarian Games: 1938
