= José Padrón =

Spanish footballer

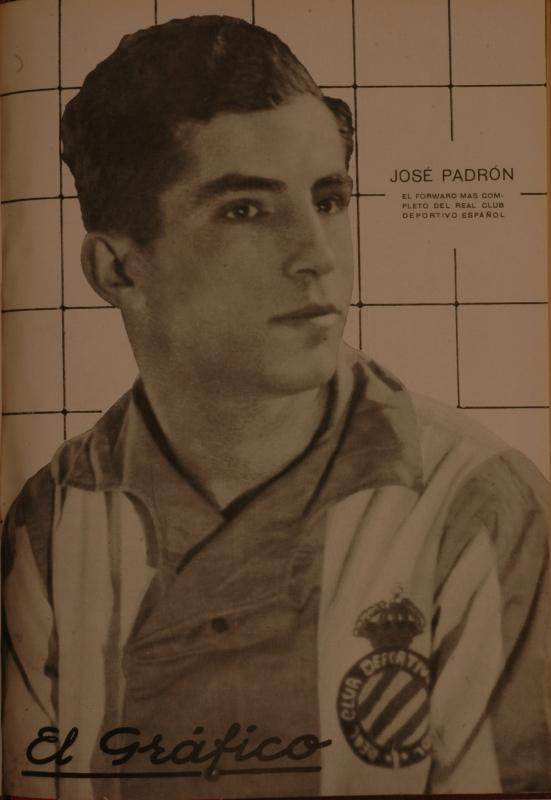
- Padrón in 1926

Personal information
- Full name: José Padrón Martín
- Date of birth: 5 May 1907
- Place of birth: Las Palmas, Spain
- Date of death: 3 December 1966 (aged 59)
- Place of death: Paris, France
- Position: Midfielder

Senior career*
Years	Team	Apps	(Gls)
1928–1930	Espanyol	27	(10)
1930–1933	Sevilla	23	(5)
1933–1936	Barcelona	6	(2)
1936	Olympique Alès		
1936–1937	Cannes		
1937–1938	Sochaux	8	(2)
1938–1939	FCO Charleville		
1940–1941	Red Star		
1941–1943	Reims		
1943–1944	Clermont - Auvergne		

International career
1929–1930	Spain	5	(2)
- * Club domestic league appearances and goals

José Padrón Martín (5 May 1907 – 3 December 1966) was a Spanish footballer who played for RCD Espanyol, Sevilla FC and FC Barcelona in Spain and various clubs in France.

== Club career ==
A native of Las Palmas, the capital of Gran Canaria and the co-capital of the Canary Islands, Padrón played five times for the Spain national team, scoring two goals. He made his début in a 5–0 victory against Portugal on 17 March 1929, scoring two goals.

He won the Copa del Rey with Espanyol in 1928–29; he is listed in some sources as one of the goalscorers in the final, and in others as one of five players sent off (there is confusion between him and Francisco Tena in both respects).

After leaving French team Cannes in 1937, he signed for Sochaux in Ligue 1, where he won the 1937–38 championship, playing just eight games and scoring two goals.

== International career ==
He earned 5 caps for the Spain national team, making his debut on 17 March 1929, aged 19 years 10 months and 12 days, in a friendly against Portugal, scoring two goals in a 5-0 win. He also was one of the eleven footballers that played for Spain in the infamous Spain v England football match on 15 May 1929.

=== International goals ===
Spain score listed first, score column indicates score after each Padrón goal.

List of international goals scored by José Padrón
No.	Date	Venue	Opponent	Score	Result	Competition
2	17 March 1929	1929 Expo stadium, Barcelona, Spain	Portugal	4–0	5–0	Friendly
3	17 March 1929	1929 Expo stadium, Barcelona, Spain	Portugal	5–0	5–0	Friendly

== Retirement ==
During World War II, he served under Raymond Dronne as part of the Free France, being part of the North African campaign, the Normandy landings, and took part in the Liberation of Paris from the Nazis. He died in the Pitié-Salpêtrière Hospital on 3 December 1966

== Honours ==
=== Club ===
RCD Espanyol

Copa del Rey:

- Winners (1) 1928-29
