= Pedro Solé =

Spanish footballer and manager

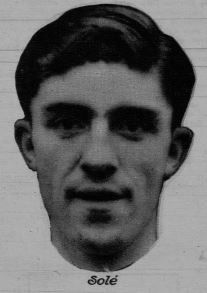

Personal information
- Full name: Pedro Solé Junoy
- Date of birth: 7 May 1905
- Place of birth: Barcelona, Spain
- Date of death: 25 February 1982 (aged 76)
- Place of death: Barcelona, Spain
- Position: Midfielder

Youth career
- 1922–1925: Avenç de l'Sport

Senior career*
Years	Team	Apps	(Gls)
1925–1926	Sant Andreu		
1926–1936	Español	128	(11)
1937–1940	Girona	13	(1)
1940–1942	Murcia	31	(3)
1942	Alcoyano	14	(0)

International career
1929–1936	Spain	4	(0)
1926–1936	Catalonia	19	(2)

Managerial career
- 1943: Español
- 1944–1945: Sabadell
- 1945–1946: Betis
- 1948–1949: Atlético Baleares
- 1950–1951: Melilla
- 1951: Orensana
- 1963–1964: Español
- * Club domestic league appearances and goals

Pedro Solé Junoy (7 May 1905 – 25 February 1982), also known as Pere Solé Junoy, was a Catalan football midfielder and manager from Spain. Until 1977, it was legally prohibited in Spain to register given names in Catalan, as only Spanish (Castilian) names were permitted under Francoist and early post-Franco civil registry laws.

== Playing career ==
Pere Solé was born in the Barcelona neighbourhood of La Sagrera in 1905. He played for l'Avenç de l'Sport (1922–1925) and its successor, UE Sant Andreu (1925–1926).

He was one of the most prominent players of RCD Espanyol during the 1920s and 1930s, helping the club win the Catalan Championship three times and the Spanish Cup once. He made his league debut with the club in the match Athletic Club 9–0 Espanyol, played on 17 February 1929 in Bilbao.

He ended his playing career at Girona FC, Real Murcia CF, and CD Alcoyano. He was capped for the Spain national football team and took part in the 1934 FIFA World Cup held in Italy. His international debut for Spain was in the match Spain 5–0 Portugal, played on 17 March 1929 in Seville. He also played for the Catalonia national football team.

He coached RCD Espanyol during the 1942–43 season alongside Ricardo Zamora. He also managed Real Betis in the 1944–45 season and CE Europa from 1955 to 1957.

== Honours ==
- Catalan Championship: 3
  - 1928–29, 1932–33, 1936–37
- Spanish Cup: 1
  - 1928–29
