= Crisant Bosch =

Spanish footballer (1907–1981)

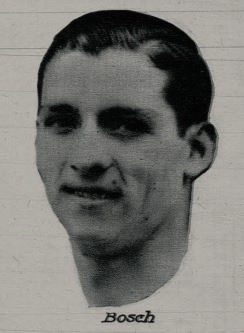

Personal information
- Full name: Crisant Bosch Espín
- Date of birth: 26 December 1907
- Place of birth: Barcelona, Spain
- Date of death: 13 April 1981 (aged 73)
- Place of death: Barcelona, Spain
- Position: Midfielder

Youth career
- Júpiter

Senior career*
| Years | Team | Apps | (Gls) |
| 1928–1943 | Espanyol | 130 | (23) |
- Terrassa

International career
| 1929–1934 | Spain | 8 | (1) |

Managerial career
- 1946: Espanyol
- * Club domestic league appearances and goals

Crisant Bosch Espín (26 December 1907 – 13 April 1981), was a Spanish footballer who played as a midfielder for RCD Espanyol, Terrassa and Spain.

== Honours ==
- Catalan football championship: 4
  - 1928/29, 1932/33, 1936/37, 1939/40
- Copa del Rey: 2
  - 1929, 1940
