= 1928–29 Copa del Rey =

1928–29 King Alfonso XIII's Cup
29th Copa del Rey

Tournament details
- Country: Spain
- Teams: 32

Final positions
- Champions: RCD Español (1st title)
- Runners-up: Real Madrid

Tournament statistics
- Matches played: 59
- Goals scored: 252 (4.27 per match)

The King Alfonso XIII's Cup 1928–29 was the 29th staging of the Copa del Rey, the Spanish football cup competition.

The competition started on December 8, 1928, and concluded on February 3, 1929, with the final, held at the Estadio Mestalla in Valencia. RCD Español won the competition for the first time.

== Teams ==
32 teams entered the competition, making a new record of participants. Navarre and the Canary Islands sent their champions for the first time. Catalonia, the Centre Region, Gipuzkoa sent three teams each. The rest of communities sent their champions and runners-up.

- Aragón: Iberia SC, Patria Aragón
- Asturias: Real Oviedo, Sporting de Gijón
- Balearic Islands: CD Alfonso XIII
- Canary Islands: Marino FC
- Cantabria: Racing de Santander, Gimnástica de Torrelavega
- Castile and León: Cultural y Deportiva Leonesa, Real Valladolid
- Catalonia: FC Barcelona, CD Europa, RCD Español
- Extremadura: CD Extremeño
- Galicia: Celta de Vigo, Racing de Ferrol
- Gipuzkoa: Real Unión, Real Sociedad, CD Logroño
- Murcia: Real Murcia, Elche CF
- Navarre: CA Osasuna
- Centre Region: Real Madrid, Athletic Madrid, Racing de Madrid
- South Region: Sevilla FC, Real Betis
- Valencia: Valencia CF, CD Castellón
- Biscay: Athletic Bilbao, Arenas Club de Getxo
- Álava: CD Alavés

== Results ==
=== Bracket ===
Round of 32
RCD Español	4	5	9
Sporting de Gijón	3	2	5
Arenas Club	2	3	5
Real Unión	0	1	1
Athletic Madrid	3	0	3
CD Extremeño	0	0	0
Gimnástica de Torrelavega	5	2	7
CD Alfonso XIII	1	1	2
FC Barcelona	7	2	9
Racing de Santander	1	2	3
Real Sociedad	6	4	10
Patria Aragón	0	0	0
Sevilla FC	0	8	8
Real Valladolid	2	0	2
CA Osasuna	2	1	4
Real Murcia	4	0	2
Real Madrid	5	4	9
Real Oviedo	0	2	2
CD Logroño	0	2	2
Real Betis	1	0	1
Racing de Madrid	0	3	3
Iberia SC	2	0	2
Valencia CF	2	2	4
CD Europa	3	1	4
Athletic Bilbao	1	7	8
Celta Vigo	2	1	3
Racing de Ferrol	1	2	3
CD Alavés	1	0	1
CD Castellón	4	1	5
Cultural y Deportiva Leonesa	2	2	4
Elche CF	bye
Marino FC

Round of 16
RCD Español	6	3	9
Arenas Club	4	1	5
Athletic Madrid	3	1	4
Gimnástica de Torrelavega	2	1	2
FC Barcelona	6	0	6
Real Sociedad	0	0	0
Sevilla FC	1	4	5
CA Osasuna	0	2	2
Real Madrid	8	5	13
CD Logroño	0	0	0
Racing de Madrid	3	2	5
Valencia FC	1	1	2
Athletic Bilbao	3	1	4
Racing de Ferrol	2	1	3
CD Castellón	5	2	7
Elche CF	0	0	0

Quarterfinals
RCD Español	5	2	7
Athletic Madrid	1	4	5
FC Barcelona	1	2	3
Sevilla FC	0	0	0
Real Madrid	3	6	9
Racing de Madrid	1	2	3
Athletic Bilbao	2	2	4
CD Castellón	2	1	3

Semifinals
RCD Español	2	1	3
FC Barcelona	0	1	1
Real Madrid	3	4	7
Athletic Bilbao	1	1	2

Final
RCD Español	2
Real Madrid	1

== Round of 32 ==
Team 1	Agg.	Team 2	1st leg	2nd leg
CD Europa	4–4	Valencia FC	3–2	1–2
Athletic de Madrid	3–0	CD Extremeño	3–0	0–0
Real Madrid	9–2	Real Oviedo	5–0	4–2
Real Betis	1–2	CD Logroño	1–0	0–2
Iberia SD	2–3	Racing de Madrid	2–0	0–3
RC Celta de Vigo	3–8	Athletic Bilbao	2–1	1–7
CD Alavés	1–3	Racing de Ferrol	1–1	0–2
CD Castellón	5–4	Cultural y Deportiva Leonesa	4–2	1–2
Arenas de Guecho	5–1	Real Unión	2–0	3–1
Sporting de Gijón	5–9	RCD Español	3–4	2–5
Gimnástica de Torrelavega	7–2	CD Alfonso XIII	5–1	2–1
Real Sociedad	10–0	CD Patria Aragón	6–0	4–0
FC Barcelona	9–3	Real Racing Club	7–1	2–2
Real Valladolid	2–8	Sevilla FC	2–0	0–8
Real Murcia		CA Osasuna	4–2	0–1
Elche FC		Marino FC		

- Tiebreaker

Team 1	Score	Team 2
CD Europa	3–4	Valencia FC
Real Murcia	2–4	CA Osasuna

== Round of 16 ==
Team 1	Agg.	Team 2	1st leg	2nd leg
FC Barcelona	6–0	Real Sociedad	6–0	0–0
Arenas de Guecho	5–9	RCD Español	4–6	1–3
Racing de Ferrol	1–5	Athletic Bilbao	1–1	0–4
Valencia FC	2–5	Racing de Madrid	1–3	1–2
Gimnástica de Torrelavega	3–4	Athletic de Madrid	2–3	1–1
Real Madrid	13–0	CD Logroño	8–0	5–0
CA Osasuna	2–5	Sevilla FC	0–1	2–4
CD Castellón	7–0	Elche FC	5–0	2–0

== Quarter-finals ==
Team 1	Agg.	Team 2	1st leg	2nd leg
RCD Español	9–3	Athletic de Madrid	5–1	4–2
Sevilla FC	0–3	FC Barcelona	0–1	0–2
CD Castellón	3–4	Athletic Bilbao	2–2	1–2
Real Madrid	9–3	Racing de Madrid	3–1	6–2

== Semi-finals ==
Team 1	Agg.	Team 2	1st leg	2nd leg
Real Madrid	7–2	Athletic Bilbao	3–1	4–1
RCD Español	3–1	FC Barcelona	2–0	1–1

== Final ==
3 February 1929
15:00 CET

RCD Español	2–1	Real Madrid
Tena II 55'; Bosch 70'		Lazcano 75'

Mestalla, Valencia
Attendance: 25,000
Referee: Pelayo Serrano

Copa del Rey 1928-29 winners
RCD Español
1st title
