= 1936–37 FC Barcelona season =

38th season in existence of FC Barcelona

FC Barcelona
1936–37 season
- President: Management commission
- Manager: Patrick O'Connell
- Mediterranean League: First
- Copa d'Espanya: Removed before starting
- Campionat de Catalunya: Second

The 1936–37 season was the 38th season for FC Barcelona.

== Results ==
Friendly

16 August 1936	RCD Espanyol	3–2	FC Barcelona	Barcelona
			Gual 49' 80'	Stadium: El Guinardó; Referee: Vilalta

23 August 1936	CE Europa	1–2	FC Barcelona	Barcelona
			Gual 20'; Torredeflot 60'	Stadium: Europa; Referee: Casterlanas

30 August 1936	CE Júpiter	1–5	FC Barcelona	Barcelona
			Barcelo 2'; Vilalba 23'; Pages 24' 39'; Gual 80'	Stadium: Poble Nou; Referee: Peris Calopa

6 September 1936	FC Barcelona	4–0	Select Catalonia	Barcelona
	Escola 8'; Barcelo 10'; Ventolra 36'; Vilalba 42'			Stadium: Les Corts; Referee: Baonza

13 September 1936	RCD Espanyol	1–0	FC Barcelona	Barcelona
				Stadium: Estadi de Montjuïc; Referee: Santiago

26 September 1936	Selecció Hospitalet	3–2	FC Barcelona	Barcelona
			Gual 70' 71'	Stadium: l'Hospitalet de Llobregat; Referee: Escola

27 September 1936	FC Barcelona	1–0	Girona FC	Barcelona
	Gual 52'			Stadium: Les Corts; Referee: Saez

15 November 1936	CE Júpiter	2–1	FC Barcelona	Barcelona
			Perez	Stadium: Poble Nou

5 December 1936	Hospitalet	0–3	FC Barcelona	Barcelona
			Torredeflot; Estrada	Stadium: l'Hospitalet de Llobregat

3 January 1937	FC Barcelona	5–3	València CF	Barcelona
	Gual; Barcelo; Escola; Balmanya			Stadium: Les Corts; Referee: Sola Marimon

10 January 1937	València CF	2–3	FC Barcelona	València
			Zabalo	Stadium: Mestalla; Referee: Soliva

17 January 1937	FC Barcelona	3–4	RCD Espanyol	Barcelona
	Gual			Stadium: Les Corts; Referee: Baonza

24 January 1937	RCD Espanyol	1–4	FC Barcelona	Barcelona
			Escola 35' 69'; Balmanya 55'; Pages 78'	Stadium: Sarria; Referee: La Plana

16 May 1937	FC Barcelona	4–4	Select Catalonia	Barcelona
	Gual 32' 38'; Escola 52'; Estrada 81'			Stadium: Les Corts; Referee: Joaquin Saez

23 May 1937	FC Barcelona	5–1	EC Granollers	Barcelona
	Estrada; Torredeflot; Perez; Homedes			Stadium: Les Corts; Referee: Gabarro

6 June 1937	FC Barcelona	2–3	Lleida Esportiu	Barcelona
	Torredeflot; Perez			Stadium: Les Corts

12 June 1937	Esportiu Reusenc	0–4	FC Barcelona	Reus
			Torredeflot; Homedes; Sospedra

13 June 1937	Lleida Esportiu	4–1	FC Barcelona	Lleida
			Rigual	Stadium: Camp d'Esports

20 June 1937	Club América	2–0	FC Barcelona	Mexico
				Referee: Rubio

20 June 1937	EC Granollers	3–4^{1}	FC Barcelona	Granollers
			Homedes; Rigual; J.Estrada; Torredeflot

27 June 1937	Atlante	1–2	FC Barcelona	Mexico
			Gual; Ventolra	Referee: Zabala

4 July 1937	FC Barcelona	9–2	UA Horta	Barcelona
	J.Estrada; Homedes; Rigual; Benedico; Torredeflot			Stadium: Les Corts

4 July 1937	Real Club España	4–5	FC Barcelona	Mexico
			Escola; Pedrol	Referee: Salceda

10 July 1937	Reus Deportiu	1–1	FC Barcelona	Reus
			J.Estrada

11 July 1937	Reus Deportiu	3–4	FC Barcelona	Reus
			Llopis equip contrari Torredeflot; Homedes

11 July 1937	Club Necaxa	2–4	FC Barcelona	Mexico
			Escola; Pedrol; Tache; Marcial p.p.	Referee: Rubio

17 July 1937	CE Júpiter	6–0	FC Barcelona
				Referee: Simon

18 July 1937	Club Necaxa	1–2	FC Barcelona	Mexico
			Pedrol; Gual	Referee: Rubio

25 July 1937	FC Barcelona	5–0	AE Prat	Barcelona
	Riqual; Torrededia; Torredeflot			Stadium: Les Corts; Referee: simon

25 July 1937	Asturias F.C.	5–1	FC Barcelona	Mexico
			Ventolra	Referee: Juan J.Lopez

28 July 1937 Homenatge a Enric Brotons	FC Barcelona	1–1	Combinat Catala	Barcelona
	Rigual			Stadium: Les Corts; Referee: Sala

1 August 1937	FC Barcelona	4–1	Gràcia FC	Barcelona
	Homedes; Benedico; Rigual			Stadium: Les Corts; Referee: Menal

1 August 1937	Club América	2–3	FC Barcelona	Mexico
			Ventolra; Escola	Referee: Esteva

8 August 1937	FC Barcelona	3–1	FC Santboià	Barcelona
	Homedes; Rigual			Stadium: Les Corts; Referee: Nelo

15 August 1937	FC Barcelona	2–3	UE Sant Andreu	Barcelona
	Homedes; Rigual			Stadium: Les Corts; Referee: Simon

15 August 1937	Mexico national football team	5–2	FC Barcelona	Mexico
			Ventolra; Tache	Stadium: Parque Necaxa; Referee: Rubio

22 August 1937	Mexico national football team	3–1	FC Barcelona	Mexico
			Pedrol	Stadium: Parque Necaxa; Referee: Salceda

22 August 1937	Esportiu Vilanoví	1–6	FC Barcelona	Vilanova i la Geltrú
			Ozcoz; Alcala; Rigual; Valles I	Referee: Fort

28 August 1937	Club Cidosa	2–7	FC Barcelona	Orizaba

29 August 1937	UE Vic	3–1	FC Barcelona	Vic
			Demetrio

6 September 1937	Brooklyn Hispano	2–4	FC Barcelona	New York
			Tache; Escola	Referee: Ulises Solano

12 September 1937 Homenatge Domenec carulla	UE Sants	2–2	FC Barcelona	Sants
			Rigual

12 September 1937	New York	3–4	FC Barcelona	New York
			Gual; Pages; Escola	Referee: Manuel Antonio

19 September 1937	UD Hospitalet	1–2	FC Barcelona	Hospitalet
			Rigual	Referee: Blanes

19 September 1937	Seleccio American Soccer league	0–2	FC Barcelona	New York
			Gual; Pages

20 September 1937	Seleccio Hebrea	0–3	FC Barcelona	New York

Campionat de Catalunya

4 October 1936 Jornada 1	FC Barcelona	1–1	CE Sabadell	Barcelona
	Munlloch 79'		Esteve 62'	Stadium: Camp de les Corts; Referee: Castarlenas

11 October 1936 Jornada 2	FC Badalona	4–2	FC Barcelona	Badalona
	Betancourt; Xiol 52' 62'		Ventolrà; Pedrol 80'	Stadium: Camp de l'avinguda Navarra

25 October 1936 Jornada 3	SC Granollers	1–3	FC Barcelona	Granollers
	Sanz 29'		Gual 6' 17' 44'

1 November 1936 Jornada 4	FC Barcelona	3–0	Girona FC	Barcelona
	Ventolrà 29'; Gual 29'; Escolà 44'			Stadium: Camp de les Corts

8 November 1936 Jornada 5	CD Español	1–2	FC Barcelona	Barcelona
	Chas 18'		Gual 33'; Escolà 57'	Stadium: Estadi de Sarrià

22 November 1936 Jornada 6	CE Sabadell	2–1	FC Barcelona	Sabadell
	Sangüesa 5'; Calvet 15'		Munlloch 10'	Stadium: Camp de la Creu Alta

29 November 1936 Jornada 7	FC Barcelona	4–1	FC Badalona	Barcelona
	Barceló 10'; Gual 15'; Ventolrà 44'; Escolà 65'		García (pp) 37'	Stadium: Camp de les Corts; Referee: Santullano

6 December 1936 Jornada 8	FC Barcelona	2–4	SC Granollers	Barcelona
	Munlloch 20'; Gual 75'		Rocasolano 5' 16'; Guix 14'; Rovira 25'	Stadium: Camp de les Corts; Attendance: 22.000

13 December 1936 Jornada 9	Girona FC	1–1	FC Barcelona	Girona
	Bremon		Gual 80'	Stadium: Estadi de Vista Alegre; Referee: Fernández

20 December 1936 Jornada 10	FC Barcelona	5–1	CD Español	Barcelona
	Escolà 20'; Ventolrà 30' 62'; Pagès 49'; Gual		Chas 74'	Stadium: Camp de les Corts

Campionat de Lliga (Lliga Mediterrània)

31 January 1937 Jornada 1	FC Barcelona	3–2	València FC	Barcelona
	Ventolrà 65'; Escolà		Vilanova 44'; Ricart 57'	Stadium: Camp de les Corts; Referee: Mallorquí

7 February 1937 Jornada 2	Girona FC	2–0	FC Barcelona	Girona
	Bremon 15'			Stadium: Estadi de Vista Alegre; Referee: Pérez

14 February 1937 Jornada 3	FC Barcelona	3–0	Athletic Club de Castelló	Barcelona
	Balmanya; Edo (pp)			Stadium: Camp de les Corts; Referee: La Plana

21 February 1937 Jornada 4	Levante FC	3–3	FC Barcelona	València
	Puig II; Botella; Martínez		Escolà	Stadium: Camp del Cami Fondo; Referee: Bayarri (València)

28 February 1937 Jornada 5	FC Barcelona	2–0	SC Granollers	Barcelona
	Escolà; Balmanya			Stadium: Camp de les Corts; Referee: Peris

7 March 1937 Jornada 6	CD Español	1–1	FC Barcelona	Barcelona
	Espada 40'		Gual 65'	Stadium: Estadi de Sarrià; Referee: Menal

14 March 1937 Jornada 7	Gimnástico FC	1–1	FC Barcelona	València
	Tatché 53'		Gual 30'	Stadium: Estadi de Vallejo; Referee: Vidal Royo

21 March 1937 Jornada 8	València FC	3–3	FC Barcelona	València
	Goiburu 40' 61'		Ventolrà 44'; Zabalo 57'; Balmanya 83'	Stadium: Estadi de Mestalla; Attendance: 25.000; Referee: Tamarit Falguera

3 April 1937 Jornada 9	FC Barcelona	0–0	Girona FC	Barcelona
				Stadium: Camp de les Corts; Referee: Planell

4 April 1937 Jornada 10	Athletic Club de Castelló	0–0	FC Barcelona	Castelló de la Plana
				Stadium: Camp del Sequiol; Referee: Martínez Palou

11 April 1937 Jornada 11	FC Barcelona	2–1	Levante FC	Barcelona
	Gual 22'		Rubio 60'	Stadium: Camp de les Corts; Referee: Puntis

18 April 1937 Jornada 12	SC Granollers	1–2	FC Barcelona	Granollers
	Eugeni 35'		Escolà 15'; Gual 70'	Referee: Álvarez

25 April 1937 Jornada 13	FC Barcelona	2–0	CD Español	Barcelona
	Gual			Stadium: Camp de les Corts; Referee: Andreu

2 May 1937 Jornada 14	FC Barcelona	5–1	Gimnástico FC	Barcelona
	Gual 1' 10' 89'; Balmanya 40'; Escolà 58'		Elicegui 65'	Stadium: Camp de les Corts; Referee: Hernández

- 1 The match was postponed on 30.05.1937
