= 1936 Copa del Presidente de la República final =

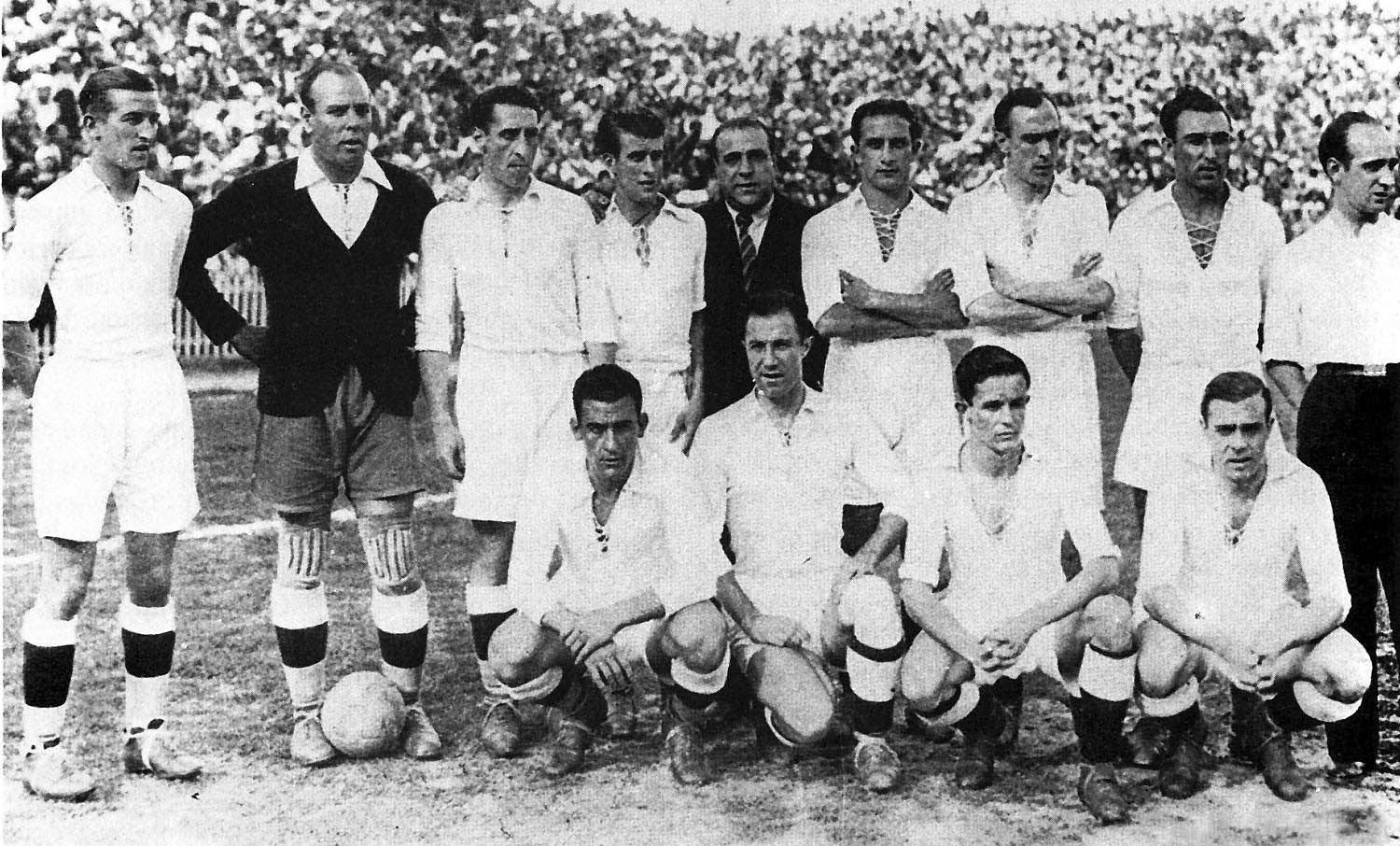
- Starting line-up of Real Madrid, champions
- Event: 1936 Copa del Presidente de la República
Madrid FC	Barcelona
2	1
- Date: 21 June 1936
- Venue: Mestalla, Valencia
- Referee: Julio Ostalé
- Attendance: 22,000

The 1936 Copa del Presidente de la República final decided the winner of the 1936 Copa del Presidente de la República, the 36th staging of Spain's premier football cup, now known as the Copa del Rey. The final was the last one before the tournament was cancelled due to the Spanish Civil War until 1939, and therefore the last one under the "Copa del Predidente de la República" name.

In the match, held on 21 June at the Mestalla in Valencia, Real Madrid (then known as "Madrid FC" for political reasons) defeated Barcelona 2-1 in the first El Clásico final. It was Real Madrid's 7th title in their 15th final, while Barcelona appeared for the 16th time and were denied their 13th title.

The match is remembered for the "impossible save" by Madrid goalkeeper Ricardo Zamora, which denied Barcelona's Josep Escolà from scoring a last-minute equaliser. This is the most remembered save in the history of Spanish football.

== Road to the final ==
Real Madrid			Round	Barcelona
Opponent	Result	Legs		Opponent	Result	Legs
Arenas Getxo	3–3	2–1 home; 1–2 away; 6–1 replay	Round of 16	Sporting Gijón	4–0	0–0 away; 4–0 home
Athletic Bilbao	3–1	2–1 home; 1–0 away	Quarter-finals	Español	5–2	1–2 away; 4–0 home
Hércules	8–2	7–0 home; 1–2 away	Semi-finals	Osasuna	9–5	2–4 away; 7–1 home

== Match details ==
21 June 1936
17:00 CET

Madrid FC	2–1	FC Barcelona
Eugenio 6'; Lecue 12'	Report (in Spanish)	Escolà 29'

Mestalla Stadium, Valencia
Attendance: 22,000
Referee: Julio Ostalé

Madrid FC
Barcelona

GK	1	(Spain) Ricardo Zamora (c)
DF	2	(Spain) Ciriaco Errasti
DF	3	(Spain) Jacinto Quincoces
MF	4	(Spain) Pedro Regueiro
MF	5	(Spain) Antonio Bonet
MF	6	(Mexico) José Ramón Sauto
FW	7	(Spain) Eugenio
FW	8	(Spain) Luis Regueiro
FW	9	(Spain) Ildefonso Sañudo
FW	10	(Spain) Simón Lecue
FW	11	(Spain) Emilín
Manager:
(Spain) Francisco Bru

GK	1	(Spain) José Iborra
DF	2	(Spain) Pedro Areso
DF	3	(Spain) José Bayo
MF	4	(Spain) José Argemí
MF	5	(Spain) Antonio Franco
MF	6	(Spain) Domènec Balmanya
FW	7	(Spain) Martí Ventolrà (c)
FW	8	(Spain) Josep Raich
FW	9	(Spain) Josep Escolà
FW	10	(Uruguay) Enrique Fernández
FW	11	(Spain) Julio Munlloch
Manager:
(Republic of Ireland) Patrick O'Connell

== See also ==
- El Clásico
