= Julio Munlloch =

Spanish footballer

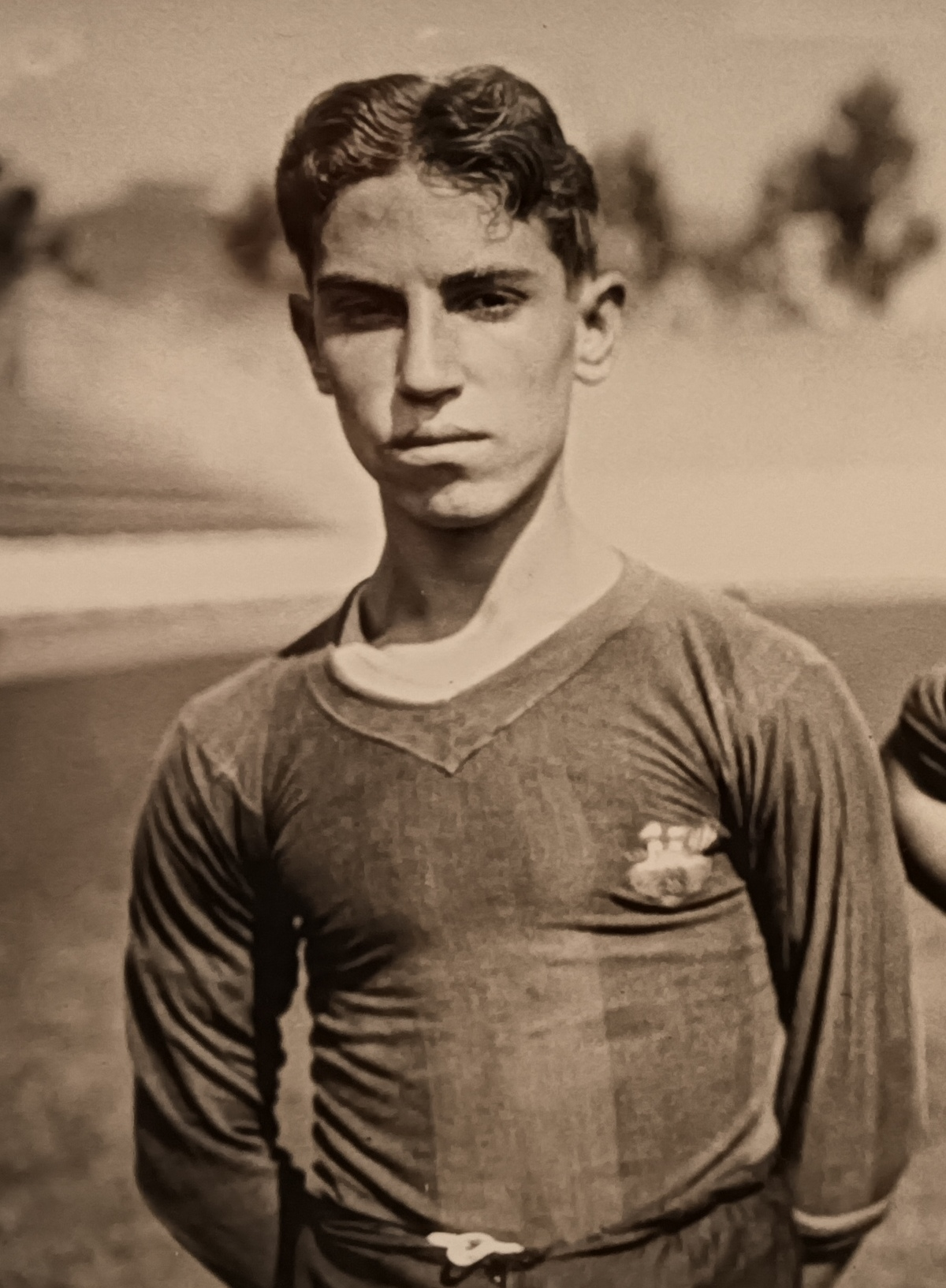

Personal information
- Full name: Julio Munlloch Martí
- Birth name: Juli Munlloch i Martí
- Date of birth: 22 October 1916
- Place of birth: Barcelona, Catalonia, Spain
- Date of death: 9 January 1996 (aged 79)
- Place of death: Mexico City, Mexico
- Position: Forward

Youth career
- Petits Bordoys
- –1930: Petits Rodés
- 1930–1932: UD Gràcia

Senior career*
Years	Team	Apps	(Gls)
1932–1934	Catalunya FC		
1934–1937	FC Barcelona	12	(0)
1938	Olympique de Marseille		
1938–1940	Club Asturias		
1940	Vélez Sarsfield	9	(1)
1940–1946	Atlante		
Total			(0)

International career
1936	Catalonia	1	(0)
- * Club domestic league appearances and goals

Julio Munlloch Martí (22 October 1916 – 9 January 1996) was a Spanish footballer who played as a forward for FC Barcelona in Spain, Olympique de Marseille in France, Asturias and Atlante in Mexico, and Vélez Sarsfield in Argentina.

== Early life ==
Julio Munlloch was born on Providència Street in the Gràcia neighborhood of Barcelona on 22 October 1916, as the second and last child of the marriage formed by Antoni Munlloch and Concepció Martí, both natives of Barcelona. His father, who was a lottery player, bought tickets at the administration run by Miguel Valdés, a former FC Barcelona player, and sold them in the neighborhood.

Munlloch grew up with the sporting successes of FC Barcelona's first golden team, which won five Catalan championship, three Copa del Rey titles, and one La Liga between 1925 and 1930, which naturally motivated him to pursue a footballing career, having his first contact with the ball on the streets of his neighborhood with his friends.

== Playing career ==
=== Early career ===
Munlloch began his footballing career in the youth ranks of his hometown club CE Europa, known as Petits Bordoys ("The Bordoys boys"), named after the club's former goalkeeper Juan Bordoy. He later recalled that he had started as a center forward as a child, but he "failed because I was afraid since my physique could not resist hand-to-hand combat; so I continued as a right winger".

Following the merger between Europa and Gràcia SC, from which Catalunya FC was born, Munlloch played for the Petits Rodés team of the new entity, later transferring all the players to UD Gràcia in 1930, at the age of 14. He then played two seasons in both Gràcia (1930–32) and Catalunya FC (1932–34), where his quality as a winger stood out, and despite being slim and of short stature, he made up for the lack of muscle with intelligence, skill and a great change of pace, something that caught the attention of one of Barça's most visionary scouts, former goalkeeper Ramón Llorens; he was signed in late 1934, at the age of 18.

=== FC Barcelona ===
Munlloch made his debut with the first team on the Christmas Day of 1934, in a friendly match against Sport Club de La Plana in Les Corts (2–1). After scoring 5 goals in 10 friendlies during the 1934–35 season, he made his official debut with the first team in the following season, helping his side to a 5–2 away victory over Sabadell in the opening day of the 1935–36 Catalan championship on 1 September. After just a few games, he was already being described as a "sensational discovery", and following his first derby, against Espanyol in the Sarrià Stadium on 29 September, which Barça won (1–2), the Mundo Deportivo journalist José Luis Lasplazas wrote that "not only was he the best winger on the field, but he was also the best striker, or very close to it".

In his first season at the club, he played a crucial role in helping Barça win the Catalan championship after winning nine games out of ten, with Munlloch featuring in nine and scoring three goals, one of them in the trashing of CE Júpiter (11–0) on 20 October, just four days after his 19th birthday, and which mathematically gave the team the title. In the following match, on 25 October, he netted a brace in a 2–0 win over Badalona, but sustained an injury that kept him out for almost six months. During this period, at the end of 1935, Munlloch was employed in the offices of a company owned by the former Barça president Esteve Sala, and even though he easily could make a living exclusively from football, Munlloch wanted to be prepared for his post-retirement period, so he kept combining training with his work as an accountant, which shows that despite his young age, he was already very mature and responsible. He was only able to make his La Liga debut on matchday 22, which ended in a 2–2 draw with Hércules on 19 April 1936. His performance was terrible, but the then Barça coach Patrick O'Connell encouraged him to continue, and from then on, he never left the starting team again.

In his 4 seasons at Barça, Munlloch scored a total of 16 goals in 64 matches, including 14 in 44 competitive games, but failed to score a single goal in his 12 La La Liga matches. He helped Barça win two Catalan Championships in 1935 and 1936, and the inaugural edition of the Mediterranean League in the 1936–37 season, as well as helping his side reach the final of the 1936 Copa del Rey, which ended in a 1–2 loss to Paco Bru's Real Madrid. In the second leg of the semifinals, Munlloch delivered four assists to help his side to a 7–1 win over Osasuna; Munlloch later recalled this match as one of the best he had played. The sports press, which sometimes misspelled his name as "Julín" or "Julianet", often praised his speed, audacity, intuition, agility, mathematical crosses, as well as his generosity, being hardworking, humble, and supportive. He was even once described as "a true tightrope walker of the ball". Munlloch was baptized as "the mathematical center winger" by Soto Viñolo in the pages of 'Barça' in November 1971.

In the summer of 1937, Munlloch was a member of Barça team that made a tour to Mexico and the United States in the middle of the Spanish Civil War. In the images of the Barça line-ups in Mexico, he wore a surprising and rigorous military haircut, which some historians later blamed on lice, but the true reason for this was that he had made a bet with a teammate while aboard the ocean liner "Mexique", which consisted of either cutting his abundant and wavy hair that had accompanied him since his childhood, or paying for an appetizer to the rest of the squad, and the responsible Munlloch chose to go through the ship's barber's scissors. On 20 September, he scored a goal in the last match of the tour, in which Barça defeated a Jewish All-Star 3–0. Because of the ongoing War in Spain, only a handful of Barça members took the risk of returning to Barcelona, including Munlloch and the coach O'Connell. He played his last match for Barça on 12 December 1937, scoring his side's only goal in a 1–1 draw with Girona.

=== Olympique de Marseille ===
In January 1938, the 21-year-old Munlloch was mobilized and assigned to the Republican front in the Val d'Aran, near the Pyrenees, which was "a very calm front", but when the situation worsened, Munlloch was forced, like so many others, to cross the French border, where he ended up being assigned to a refugee camp near Marseille. In August 1938, the president of Olympique de Marseille heard that there was a footballer from Barça on the field, so he was immediately incorporated into the team, which had the likes of Larbi Benbarek and Jaguaré, the latter having been a Barça goalkeeper in 1932.

=== Club Asturias of Mexico ===
Munlloch did not play a single official match with Olympique, as he then decided to return to the United States, who had offered him 30 dollars for a job and another 30 for playing, but after a conversation with teammate Fernando García, he went to Mexico instead, where he signed for Club Asturias, whose president Paulino Coto had been impressed by his exquisite football in the summer of 1937 and had told him: "Julio, whenever you want to return to Mexico, the doors of Club Asturias are open to you". Following a latter from Munlloch, Coto also sent him money so that he could leave France urgently, boarding a ship in the port of Le Havre along with his mother, his sister and his brother-in-law Victoriano; his father had already been buried. Munlloch had planned for this exile to be temporary and to eventually return to Catalonia to rebuild his life and continue playing for Barça, so he left his apartment in the care of his best friend, Joan Puig, who kept it in good condition, housing Julio's mother, who did not adapt to life in Mexico. He had met Puig during his short stint in Sant Esteve de Palautordera, where Barça sent him for a few weeks so that he could gain weight by soaking up the pure air of Montseny.

The Munlloch family arrived in Mexico in October 1938, and Julio was quickly incorporated into Club Asturias, where he played alongside two former teammates, Joaquín Urquiaga and Fernando García, making his debut on 27 November, against Club España, which also had two former Barça players, Miguel Gual and Martí Ventolrà, who went on to marry the niece of Mexico's President Lázaro Cárdenas. He played a crucial role in the Asturias team that was proclaimed Mexican champions in 1939, finishing the league season with 17 points, two more than runner-up Euzkadi, a team made up of Basque players. He also helped Asturias win back-to-back Mexican Cups in 1939 and 1940, beating in the finals Club España (4–1) and Necaxa (1–0), respectively. During his time in Mexico, the local press constantly praised him, describing him as a "very fine silk player, who sends the ball smoothly as if on a thread, wherever he puts his eye".

According to the American sports media ESPN, Munlloch was the third Barça footballer to play in the Mexican top division, only after Ventolrà and Josep Iborra; the likes of Pep Guardiola and Ronaldinho would later join this group as well. One sources wrongly states that the Catalans Vantolrá, Iborra, and Munlloch played for the so-called Euzkadi team in the Mexican league.

=== Later career ===
In 1939, the 23-year-old Munlloch stood out from the rest thanks to his great skill and dribbling, thus becoming a highly valued player sought after by several Argentine, Paraguayan, and other South American teams, but it was Vélez Sarsfield of Buenos Aires who hired him during their tour of Mexico. He made his debut in that tour, on 14 January 1940, scoring a goal in an eventual 4–2 loss to Club España. At Velez Sarsfield, he only scored one goal in nine official matches as the club was relegated, but despite this, "the Buenos Aires public always treated me very well". He thus returned to Mexico, this time to Atlante, where he played alongside Ventolrà, and together, they came very close to winning the 1941–42 championship as they finished tied on 18 points, but then lost the play-off match 5–4, although they won the Mexican Cup after defeating Necaxa (3–5 and 5–0).

He barely played in the following seasons due to injuries, especially one to his meniscus, remaining loyal to Atlante for five years, until 1946, aged 29. In the 1944–45 season, he only played in two cup matches. He was tempted to return to Barça in 1943, but he declined that possibility due to his physical problems, stating that he "preferred to leave a good memory of my brief, but intense time in the Barça ranks".

== International career ==
On 15 November 1936, Munlloch earned his first and only international cap for the Catalan national team in a match against Valencia CF at the pro anti-fascist militias festival at the Mestalla Stadium, featuring on attack alongside Josep Escolà in a 0–4 loss.

== Personal life ==
Munlloch loved detective novels, liked adventure movies, and on the desk in his room, in addition to notes and books in French, he accumulated clippings from sports press that mentioned him in order to later read them to "remember these times". In addition to football, he was also passionate about ping-pong and athletics. Despite taking residence in Mexico, he never dropped his mother tongue, joining the Orfeó Català, even being part of the choir.

Due to his popularity in Mexico, Munlloch began attending fashionable shows of that time, such as bullfights and carpas, a sort of theater that flourished in Mexico during the 1920s and 1930s, and it was in such places that he met Cantinflas, briefly dating his sister-in-law, the Moscow native Valentina Ivanova Zuvareff. In 1944, he married Irene Piñuelo Dávalos, a Mexican woman of Spanish descent, and the couple had five children: Irene, Concepción, Nuria, Julio, and Javier, with the latter dying at the age of five.

== Later life ==
"I always felt an emptiness, like the feeling of failure. I would have liked to succeed here, at Barça. I knew that I had it inside me, and on my great afternoons of football, in Argentina or Mexico, when I performed better, the memory of Les Corts, of that audience that welcomed me so quickly and formidably, and to whom I could give so little, came to me with greater force."

— Munlloch reminiscing about his career in the 1970s.

At the time, most footballers struggled after their retirement, but thanks to his maturity and studies, Munlloch had no issues in integrating into society, initially working in the cotton sector before changing his career and joining the world of construction, where he sold carts of sand, plaster, and mortar, eventually opening a construction materials business titled Fierros y Cementos Munlloch S.A.

After many years of intense work and sacrifice, Munlloch reached a position that allowed him to enjoy his hobby of traveling, passing through Australia, Fiji, Hawaii, New Zealand, New Caledonia, Soviet Union, China, and South Africa, where he went on a photographic safari. He visited Barcelona approximately every three years, timing it to coincide with the Festa Major de Gràcia, where he reunited with his long-time friend Joan Puig, who still lived in his old apartment and thus always had a room available for him.

== Death ==
Munlloch died in Mexico City on 9 January 1966, at the age of 79, a victim of cancer.

== Honours ==
FC Barcelona

- Catalan championship
  - Champions (1): 1934–35 and 1935–36
- Copa del Rey:
  - Runner-up (1): 1936

Club Asturias

- Copa México:
  - Champions (2): 1938–39 and 1939–40
- Liga Mayor:
  - Champions (1): 1943–44
- Campeón de Campeones:
  - Runners-up (1): 1944
