= 1935–36 FC Barcelona season =

37th season in existence of FC Barcelona

FC Barcelona
1935–36 season
- President: Josep Sunyol
- Manager: Patrick O'Connell
- Campionat de Lliga: Fifth
- Copa d'Espanya: Vice-Champion
- Campionat de Catalunya: First

The 1935–36 season was the 37th season for FC Barcelona.

== Results ==
Friendly

18 August 1935	Mollet	4–7	FC Barcelona	Mollet del Vallès
			Sol; Pujol; M.García; Romeu	Referee: Oriol

25 August 1935	CE Júpiter	0–2	FC Barcelona	Barcelona
			Fernandez 9'; M.García 28'	Stadium: Poble Nou; Referee: Rovira

11 September 1935	FC Barcelona	2–5	Hèrcules CF	Barcelona
	Sol 65'; Saurina 70'			Stadium: Les Corts; Referee: Llovera

23 September 1935	Gimnàstic	0–3	FC Barcelona	Tarragona
			Romeu; M.García	Stadium: Avinguda de Catalunya; Referee: Andreu

8 December 1935	CE Europa	1–0	FC Barcelona	Barcelona
				Stadium: Europa

25 December 1935	FC Barcelona	8–2	Baracaldo	Barcelona
	Polo 13' 19' 32'; M.García 40' 44' 84'; Rubio 83'; Aubach 88'			Stadium: Les Corts; Referee: Comorera

6 January 1936	FC Barcelona	5–2	Arenas	Barcelona
	Samitier 17' 24' 28'; Ventolra 43'; Polo 88'			Stadium: Les Corts; Referee: Baliu

22 February 1936	FC Barcelona	2–3	UE Sants	Barcelona
	M.García			Stadium: Les Corts; Referee: Baonza

26 February 1936	FC Barcelona	4–0	RCD Mallorca	Barcelona
	Escola 6' 26'; M.García 44' 75'			Stadium: Les Corts; Referee: Comorera

19 March 1936	FC Barcelona	1–1	UE Sants	Barcelona
	Gual 4'			Stadium: Les Corts; Referee: Santiago

4 April 1936	FC Barcelona	8–0	CF Badalona	Barcelona
	Gual; Polo; Naves equip contrari			Stadium: Les Corts; Referee: Baliu

5 April 1936	UE Poble Sec	1–4	FC Barcelona	Barcelona
			Gual; Polo	Stadium: Estadi Municipal de la Satàlia; Referee: Pages

14 April 1936	CE Sabadell FC	1–3	FC Barcelona	Sabadell
			Estrada; Torredeflot; Polo	Stadium: Creu Alta; Referee: Vilalta

18 April 1936	FC Barcelona	6–1	CE Júpiter	Barcelona
	Pascual 15' 35' 65'; Saurina 51'; Estrada 61' 67'			Stadium: Les Corts; Referee: Esteve

21 May 1936	FC Barcelona	3–1	Iluro SC	Barcelona
	Perez; Santiveri			Stadium: Les Corts; Referee: Tonijuan

1 June 1936	Iluro SC	2–2	FC Barcelona	Mataró
			Polo	Referee: Rovira

28 June 1936	FC Barcelona	3–1	Racing	Barcelona
	Munlloch 70'; Villalba 74'; Torredeflot 80'			Stadium: Les Corts; Referee: Comorera

Campionat de Catalunya

1 September 1935 Jornada 1	CE Sabadell	2–5	FC Barcelona	Sabadell
	Barceló 10'; Gracia 30'		Ventolrà; Escolà 47' 57'; Raich 67' 85'	Stadium: Camp de la Creu Alta

8 September 1935 Jornada 2	FC Barcelona	5–2	Girona FC	Barcelona
	Ventolrà 30' 63' 82'; Escolà 52' 75'		Trujillo 7'; Clara 22'	Stadium: Camp de les Corts

15 September 1935 Jornada 3	CD Júpiter	0–3	FC Barcelona	Barcelona
			Escolà; Berkessy

22 September 1935 Jornada 4	FC Barcelona	5–2	FC Badalona	Barcelona
	Escolà 5' 50'; Raich 30'; Pedrol 45' 90'		Serra 14'; Serracant 42'	Stadium: Camp de les Corts

29 September 1935 Jornada 5	CD Español	1–2	FC Barcelona	Barcelona
	Green 7'		Fernández 40'; Escolà 60'	Stadium: Estadi de Sarrià; Attendance: 10.000; Referee: Soliva

6 October 1935 Jornada 6	FC Barcelona	4–1	CE Sabadell	Barcelona
	Munlloch 10'; Escolà 15' 68'; Fernández 56'		Gual 28'	Stadium: Camp de les Corts

13 October 1935 Jornada 7	Girona FC	0–3	FC Barcelona	Girona
			Escolà; Fernández; Trias (pp)	Stadium: Camp de Vistalegre

20 October 1935 Jornada 8	FC Barcelona	11–0	CD Júpiter	Barcelona
	Escolà; Fernández; Ventolrà; Munlloch			Stadium: Camp de les Corts

27 October 1935 Jornada 9	FC Badalona	0–2	FC Barcelona	Sant Adrià del Besòs
			Munlloch 16' 68'	Stadium: Camp de Sant Adrià; Referee: Melcon

3 November 1935 Jornada 10	FC Barcelona	1–1	CD Español	Barcelona
	Pagès 25'		Green 70'	Stadium: Camp de les Corts

Campionat de Lliga

10 November 1935 Jornada 1	CD Español	1–0	FC Barcelona	Barcelona
	Lorenzo 78'			Stadium: Estadi de Sarrià; Referee: Melcon

17 November 1935 Jornada 2	FC Barcelona	5–1	Athletic Club de Madrid	Barcelona
	Escolà 30' 56'; Ventolrà 49'; Zabalo 64'; Fernández 76'		Chacho 12'	Stadium: Camp de les Corts; Referee: Iturralde Gorostiaga

24 November 1935 Jornada 3	València FC	1–2	FC Barcelona	València
	Amadeo 46'		Escolà 2' 83'	Stadium: Estadi de Mestalla; Referee: Iglesias

1 December 1935 Jornada 4	FC Barcelona	4–1	Sevilla FC	Barcelona
	Escolà 20'; Torredeflot 44'; Zabalo 56'; Ventolrà 58'		Luisin 62'	Stadium: Camp de les Corts; Referee: Ostale Gómez (Aragó)

8 December 1935 Jornada 5	Racing Club de Santander	4–0	FC Barcelona	Santander
	Chas 49' 55'; Milucho 61' 78'			Stadium: Campos de Sport del Sardinero; Referee: Iturralde Gorostiaga

15 December 1935 Jornada 6	FC Barcelona	5–2	Oviedo FC	Barcelona
	Ventolrà 37'; Escolà 49' 89'; Barceló 82' 84'		Casuco 22'; Lángara 56'	Stadium: Camp de les Corts; Referee: Álvarez

15 December 1935 Jornada 7	FC Barcelona	0–3	Madrid FC	Barcelona
	Escolà 49' Barceló 82' 84'		Regueiro 21'; Diz 40'; Lecue 47'	Stadium: Camp de les Corts; Referee: Vallana Jeanguenat

29 December 1935 Jornada 8	CA Osasuna	0–1	FC Barcelona	Pamplona
			Ventolrà 81'	Stadium: Estadio de San Juan; Referee: Balaguer (Madrid)

5 January 1936 Jornada 9	FC Barcelona	2–0	Athletic Club	Barcelona
	Raich 56'; Escolà 74'			Stadium: Camp de les Corts; Referee: Escartín Morán (Madrid)

12 January 1936 Jornada 10	Betis Balompié	2–0	FC Barcelona	Sevilla
	Rancel 15'; Unamuno 79'			Stadium: Campo del Patronato Obrero; Referee: Orduña

26 January 1936 Jornada 11	FC Barcelona	1–0	Hércules FC	Barcelona
	Zabalo 15'			Stadium: Camp de les Corts; Referee: Canga Argüelles

2 February 1936 Jornada 12	FC Barcelona	2–0	CD Español	Barcelona
	Fernández 26'; Escolà 64'			Stadium: Camp de les Corts; Referee: Balaguer (Madrid)

9 February 1936 Jornada 13	Athletic Club de Madrid	0–3	FC Barcelona	Madrid
			Escolà 26' 75' 84'	Stadium: Stadium Metropolitano; Referee: Vallana Jeanguenat

15 February 1936 Jornada 14	FC Barcelona	0–0	València FC	Barcelona
				Stadium: Camp de les Corts; Referee: Ostale Gómez (Aragó)

1 March 1936 Jornada 15	Sevilla FC	2–1	FC Barcelona	Sevilla
	Sánchez 2'; Alcázar 36'		Ventolrà 85'	Stadium: Estadio de Nervión; Referee: Álvarez

8 March 1936 Jornada 16	FC Barcelona	2–3	Racing Club de Santander	Barcelona
	Torredeflot 44'; Polo 76'		Cuca 8'; Milucho 27'; Marcos 89'	Stadium: Camp de les Corts; Referee: Iglesias

15 March 1936 Jornada 17	Oviedo FC	2–1	FC Barcelona	Oviedo
	Herrerita 34'; Gallart 75'		M.García 24'	Stadium: Estadio de Buenavista; Referee: Ostale Gómez (Aragó)

15 March 1936 Jornada 18	Madrid FC	3–0	FC Barcelona	Chamartín de la Rosa
	Lecue 10' 47'; Emilín 43'			Stadium: Estadi de Chamartín; Referee: Soliva (València)

29 March 1936 Jornada 19	FC Barcelona	5–0	CA Osasuna	Barcelona
	Fernández 5' 34' 38'; Ventolrà 52'; Raich 63'			Stadium: Camp de les Corts; Referee: Vallana Jeanguenat

5 April 1936 Jornada 20	Athletic Club	5–2	FC Barcelona	Bilbao
	Iraragorri 34' 54'; Gorostiza 36'; Gárate 45'; Bata 68'		Fernández 2' 76'	Stadium: Estadi de San Mamés; Referee: Areces

12 April 1936 Jornada 21	FC Barcelona	1–0	Betis Balompié	Barcelona
	Escolà 12'			Stadium: Camp de les Corts; Referee: Crespo

19 April 1936 Jornada 22	Hércules FC	2–2	FC Barcelona	Alacant
	Blázquez 35' 39'		Berkessy 63'; Fernández 78'	Stadium: Estadi Bardín; Referee: Balaguer (Madrid)

Copa d'Espanya

10 May 1936 Vuitens de final – anada	Sporting Club de Gijón	0–0	FC Barcelona	Gijón
				Stadium: Estadi El Molinón

17 May 1936 Vuitens de final – tornada	FC Barcelona	4–0	Sporting Club de Gijón	Barcelona
	Fernández			Stadium: Camp de les Corts

24 May 1936 Quarts de final – anada	CD Español	2–1	FC Barcelona	Barcelona
	Pérez 52'; Prat 60'		Escolà	Stadium: Estadi de Sarrià

31 May 1936 Quarts de final – tornada	FC Barcelona	3–0	CD Español	Barcelona
	Ventolrà; Escolà			Stadium: Camp de les Corts

7 June 1936 Semifinals – anada	CA Osasuna	4–2	FC Barcelona	Pamplona
	Vergara 67' 75'; F. Bienzobas 68'		Torredeflot 62'	Stadium: Estadio de San Juan; Referee: Escartín Morán (Madrid)

14 June 1936 Semifinale – tornada	FC Barcelona	7–1	CA Osasuna	Barcelona
	Ventolrà 2' 36'; Escolà 5' 9' 68' 84'		Insausti 17'	Stadium: Camp de les Corts; Attendance: 45.000; Referee: Sanchis Orduña

21 June 1936 Finale	Madrid FC	2–1	FC Barcelona	València
	Eugenio 6'; Leuce 12'		Escolà 29'	Stadium: Estadi de Mestalla; Attendance: 22.000; Referee: Ostale Gómez (Aragó)
