= 1934–35 FC Barcelona season =

36th season in existence of FC Barcelona

Barcelona
1934–35 season
- President: Esteve Sala (until July 27, 1935); Josep Sunyol (from July 27, 1935)
- Manager: Ferenc Plattkó
- Stadium: Les Corts
- La Liga: 6th
- Catalan League: Champions
- Copa del Rey: Quarter-finals
- Top goalscorer: League: Josep Escolà (17); All: Josep Escolà (36)

The 1934–35 season was FC Barcelona's 36th in existence. It covers the period from August 1, 1934, to July 31, 1935.

After two years without winning a title, FC Barcelona won the Catalan League for the 19th time.

== First-team squad ==
Note: Flags indicate national team as defined under FIFA eligibility rules; some limited exceptions apply. Players may hold more than one non-FIFA nationality.

No.	Pos.	Nation	Player
—	GK	ESP	Juan José Nogués
—	GK	ESP	Ramón Llorens
—	GK	ESP	José Francàs
—	DF	ESP	Esteban Pedrol
—	DF	ESP	Ramón Zabalo
—	DF	ESP	Juan Rafa
—	DF	ESP	Francisco Alcoriza
—	DF	ESP	José Arana
—	MF	ESP	Juan Trujillo
—	MF	HUN	Elemér Berkessy
—	MF	ESP	Domingo Ruano
—	MF	ESP	Antonio Franco
—	MF	ESP	Ramón Guzmán

No.	Pos.	Nation	Player
—	MF	ESP	Pascual Salas
—	MF	ESP	Josep Raich
—	MF	ESP	Ramón Lecuona
—	MF	ESP	Salvador Soler
—	FW	ESP	Josep Escolà
—	FW	ESP	Martín Ventolrà
—	FW	ESP	Josep Pagès
—	FW	ESP	Juan Ramón
—	FW	ESP	Mario Cabanes
—	FW	ESP	Joan Saurina
—	FW	CRC	Alejandro Morera
—	FW	URU	Enrique Fernández

== Transfers ==
=== In ===
Note: Flags indicate national team as defined under FIFA eligibility rules; some limited exceptions apply. Players may hold more than one non-FIFA nationality.

No.	Pos.	Nation	Player
—	GK	ESP	José Francàs
—	DF	ESP	José Arana
—	MF	ROU	Elemér Berkessy
—	MF	ESP	Domingo Ruano
—	MF	ESP	Antonio Franco
—	MF	ESP	Josep Raich

No.	Pos.	Nation	Player
—	MF	ESP	Ramón Lecuona
—	FW	ESP	Josep Escolà
—	FW	ESP	Josep Pagès
—	FW	ESP	Joan Saurina
—	FW	URU	Enrique Fernández

=== Out ===
Note: Flags indicate national team as defined under FIFA eligibility rules; some limited exceptions apply. Players may hold more than one non-FIFA nationality.

No.	Pos.	Nation	Player
—	GK	ESP	Manuel Cruz
—	DF	ESP	Patricio Arnau
—	DF	ESP	Juan Villacampa
—	DF	ESP	José Saló
—	DF	ESP	Alejandro Espuny
—	MF	ESP	Valentín Font
—	MF	ESP	Carlos Bestit

No.	Pos.	Nation	Player
—	MF	ESP	Severiano Goiburu (to Valencia)
—	MF	ESP	Agustín Costa
—	MF	ESP	Victoriano De Santos (to Valencia)
—	FW	ESP	José Padrón
—	FW	ESP	Francisco "Quico" Tejera
—	FW	ESP	Ramón Miranda

== Competitions ==
=== La Liga ===
==== League table ====
Pos	Team	Pld	W	D	L	GF	GA	GD	Pts
5	Sevilla	22	11	2	9	53	38	+15	24
6	Barcelona	22	9	6	7	55	44	+11	24
7	Atlético Madrid	22	8	5	9	40	45	–5	21

==== Results by round ====
Round	1	2	3	4	5	6	7	8	9	10	11	12	13	14	15	16	17	18	19	20	21	22
Ground	H	A	H	A	H	A	H	A	H	A	H	A	H	A	H	A	H	A	H	A	H	A
Result	W	L	W	W	W	L	D	L	D	L	W	D	W	L	D	L	D	W	L	W	W	D
Position	3	3	2	3	3	2	3	4	5	6	5	5	4	5	5	7	6	4	6	6	5	6

Source: Competitive matches
A = Away; H = Home; W = Win; D = Draw; L = Loss

==== Matches ====
2 December 1934 1	Barcelona	4–0	Arenas	Barcelona
	Ramón 14', 38'; Ventolrà 63'; Escolà 78'	Report		Stadium: Les Corts; Referee: Ostalé Gómez

9 December 1934 2	Betis	2–1	Barcelona	Seville
	Rancel 39'; Timimi 53'	Report	Raich 38'	Stadium: Patronato Obrero; Referee: Iglesias Gracia

16 December 1934 3	Barcelona	4–0	Donostia	Barcelona
	Escola 3', 62'; Arana 8' (o.g.); Raich 81'	Report		Stadium: Les Corts; Referee: Canga Argüelles

23 December 1934 4	Atlético Madrid	1–3	Barcelona	Madrid
	Elícegui 14'	Report	Pagès 28'; Ventolrà 68'; Escolà 75'	Stadium: Metropolitano; Referee: Vallés

30 December 1934 5	Barcelona	5–2	Oviedo	Barcelona
	Pagès 2'; Raich 57', 65'; Escolà 73', 81'	Report	Gallart 9'; Lángara 51'	Stadium: Les Corts; Referee: Ostalé Gómez

6 January 1935 6	Espanyol	4-1	Barcelona	Barcelona
	Iriondo 27', 53'; Edelmiro 42'; Prat 71'	Report	Raich 89'	Stadium: Sarrià; Referee: Ginés Santiago

13 January 1935 7	Barcelona	2–2	Athletic Bilbao	Barcelona
	Raich 39'; Ventolrà 89'	Report	Bata 16'; Carega 58'	Stadium: Les Corts; Referee: Steimborn Ludeuvik

20 January 1935 8	Sevilla	3–1	Barcelona	Seville
	Campanal I 23', 32', 71'	Report	Ventolrà 55'	Stadium: Nervión; Referee: Sanchis Orduña

27 January 1935 9	Barcelona	1–1	Racing Santander	Barcelona
	Morera 24'	Report	Cisco 61'	Stadium: Les Corts; Referee: Escartín Morán

3 February 1935 10	Madrid	8–2	Barcelona	Madrid
	Lazcano 15', 42', 73'; Sañudo 21', 35', 47', 81'; Regueiro 29'	Report	Escolà 17'; Guzmán 68'	Stadium: Chamartín; Referee: Villanueva Calonge

10 February 1935 11	Barcelona	3–2	Valencia	Barcelona
	Ventolrà 34'; Escolà 57'; Pedrol 88'	Report	Torredeflot 47'; Goiburu 79'	Stadium: Les Corts; Referee: Iturralde Gorostiaga

17 February 1935 12	Arenas	2–2	Barcelona	Getxo
	Lelé 55', 75'	Report	Escolà 26', 49'	Stadium: Ibaiondo; Referee: Balaguer García

24 February 1935 13	Barcelona	4–0	Betis	Barcelona
	Cabanes 3'; Escolà 47', 87'; Ramón 81'	Report		Stadium: Les Corts; Referee: Vallana Jeanguenat

3 March 1935 14	Donostia	2–1	Barcelona	San Sebastián
	Ipiña 30'; Olivares 76'	Report	Ramón 61'	Stadium: Atotxa; Referee: Vallés

10 March 1935 15	Barcelona	0–0	Atlético Madrid	Barcelona
		Report		Stadium: Les Corts; Referee: Steimborn Ludeuvik

17 March 1935 16	Oviedo	4–3	Barcelona	Oviedo
	Lángara 14'; Casuco 53', 89'; Gallart 83'	Report	Ventolrà 37'; Escolà 50', 75'	Stadium: Buenavista; Referee: Steimborn Ludeuvik

24 March 1935 17	Barcelona	2–2	Espanyol	Barcelona
	Raich 43'; Berkessy 59'	Report	Prat 33'; Edelmiro II 73'	Stadium: Les Corts; Referee: Vallana Jeanguenat

31 March 1935 18	Athletic Bilbao	3–5	Barcelona	Bilbao
	Elices 14', 66'; Bata 17'	Report	Ramón 25'; Berkessy 27'; Raich 29', 49'; Escolà 78'	Stadium: San Mamés; Referee: Canga Argüelles

7 April 1935 19	Barcelona	2–3	Sevilla	Barcelona
	Ventolrà 18'; Escolà 31'	Report	Cortón 44', 75'; Campanal I 63'	Stadium: Les Corts; Referee: Balaguer García

14 April 1935 20	Racing Santander	2–3	Barcelona	Santander
	Ceballos 38' (pen.); Pombo 72'	Report	Morera 37'; Raich 43', 60'	Stadium: El Sardinero; Referee: Vallana Jeanguenat

21 April 1935 21	Barcelona	5–0	Madrid	Barcelona
	Ventolrà 43', 62', 68', 82'; Escolà 48'	Report		Stadium: Les Corts; Referee: Iturralde Gorostiaga

28 April 1935 22	Valencia	1–1	Barcelona	Valencia
	Goiburu 49'	Report	Cabanes 19'	Stadium: Mestalla; Referee: Canga Argüelles

=== Copa del Rey ===
==== Round of 16 ====
19 May 1935 First leg	Sporting Gijón	1–2	Barcelona	Gijón
			Morera; Escolà

26 May 1935 Second leg	Barcelona	5–2	Sporting Gijón	Barcelona
	Escolà; Fernández; Ventolrà; Raich			Stadium: Les Corts

==== Quarterfinals ====
2 or 3 June 1935 First leg	Barcelona	2–2	Levante	Barcelona
	Escolà			Stadium: Les Corts

9 June 1935 Second leg	Levante	1–1	Barcelona	Valencia
			Escolà	Stadium: Estadio La Cruz

11 June 1935 Tiebreaker	Levante	3–0	Barcelona	Zaragoza

=== Catalan football championship ===
==== League table ====
Pos	Team	Pld	W	D	L	GF	GA	GD	Pts
1	Barcelona	10	8	1	1	36	10	+26	17
2	Sabadell	10	6	2	2	26	14	+12	14
3	Júpiter	10	5	2	3	13	22	–9	12

==== Matches ====
16 September 1934 1	Barcelona	10–0	Júpiter	Barcelona
	Escolà; Berkessy; Morera; Cabanes			Stadium: Les Corts

23 September 1934 2	Badalona	0–3	Barcelona	Badalona
			Cabanes; Morera; Escolà

30 September 1934 3	Barcelona	3–2	Sabadell	Barcelona
	Raich; Escolà			Stadium: Les Corts

14 October 1934 4	Barcelona	4–2	Espanyol	Barcelona
	Escolà; Ventolrà			Stadium: Les Corts

21 October 1934 5	Girona	1–2	Barcelona	Girona
			Escolà; Parera

28 October 1934 6	Júpiter	1–4	Barcelona	Barcelona
			Berkessy; Escolà; Raich; Morera	Stadium: La Vernenda

1 November 1934 7	Barcelona	6–1	Badalona	Barcelona
	Morera; Escolà; Lecuona; Cabanes			Stadium: Les Corts

4 November 1934 8	Sabadell	1–0	Barcelona	Sabadell
				Stadium: Creu Alta

11 November 1934 9	Espanyol	2–2	Barcelona	Barcelona
			Raich	Stadium: Sarrià

18 November 1934 10	Barcelona	2–1	Girona	Barcelona
	Escolà; Raich			Stadium: Les Corts

== Results ==
Friendly

12 August 1934	UE Sants	1 – 2	FC Barcelona
	Figueres 52'		Soler 25'; Barrachina 30'	Referee: Esteve

26 August 1934	UE Sants	1 – 0	FC Barcelona
				Referee: Vilalta

9 September 1934	FC Barcelona	7 – 0	Real Zaragoza	Barcelona
	Escolà; Ramon; Ventorla; Raich			Stadium: Camp de les Corts; Referee: Mallorquí

11 September 1934	FC Barcelona	4 – 3	València CF	Barcelona
	Escolà; Ventorla; Cabanes			Stadium: Camp de les Corts; Referee: Mallorquí

24 September 1934	FC Barcelona	3 – 2	Llevant Unió Esportiva	Barcelona
	Barrachina; La Rosa; Trujillo			Stadium: Camp de les Corts; Referee: Espelta

25 November 1934	Real Madrid	5 – 1	FC Barcelona	Madrid
	Gurruchaga 15'; Lazcano 47' 89'; Regueiro 51' (pen.) 57'		Ramon 70'	Stadium: Chamartín; Referee: Espinosa

25 November 1934	Girona FC	2 – 2	FC Barcelona	Girona
			Serra 27' 38'	Stadium: Vista Alegre; Referee: Casterlanas

25 December 1934	FC Barcelona	2 – 1	Sport de la Plana	Barcelona
	Rovira 15' 43'			Stadium: Camp de les Corts; Referee: Baonza

8 January 1935	Dertusa FC	1 – 3	FC Barcelona	Tortosa
				Referee: Casals

22 April 1935	FC Barcelona	7 – 0	Atlètic de Sabadell	Barcelona
	Perez; Trujillo; Bosch			Stadium: Camp de les Corts; Referee: Casas

5 May 1935	UE Sants	2 – 0	FC Barcelona	Barcelona
				Stadium: Sants; Referee: Morato

19 May 1935	FC Barcelona	0 – 5	Girona FC	Barcelona
				Stadium: Camp de les Corts; Referee: Bru

26 May 1935	Girona FC	2 – 0	FC Barcelona	Girona
				Stadium: Vista Alegre; Referee: Santiago

30 May 1935	RCD Espanyol	3 – 5	FC Barcelona	Barcelona
			Samitier 20' 47'; Piera 34'; Trujillo 65'; Edelmiro I equip contrari 68'	Stadium: Sarrià; Referee: Marine

30 May 1935	FC Barcelona	3 – 0	CE Manresa	Barcelona
	F.Garcia; Gasco			Stadium: Camp de les Corts; Referee: Espelta

16 June 1935	FC Barcelona	2 – 3	València CF	Barcelona
	Salas 74'; Fernandez 88'			Stadium: Camp de les Corts; Referee: Marine

17 June 1935	CF Calella	3 – 1	FC Barcelona	Calella
			Ruano 40'	Referee: Ferrer

20 June 1935	FC Barcelona	4 – 4	Betis	Barcelona
	Ventolra 8' 14'; Fernandez 20'; Raich 43'			Stadium: Camp de les Corts; Referee: Casterlanas

24 June 1935	FC Barcelona	7 – 2	LLevant	Barcelona
	Escola 5' 48'; Fernandez 32' 41' 68'; Munlloch 39'; Ramon 89'			Stadium: Camp de les Corts; Referee: Comorera

29 June 1935	Reus Deportiu	3 – 6	FC Barcelona	Reus
			Amoros 11'; Munlloch 18' 56'; Saurina 19' 75'; Raich 34'	Referee: Pages

30 June 1935	Reus Deportiu	2 – 4	FC Barcelona	Reus
			Fernandez II 6'; Munlloch 52' 67'; Fernandez 80'	Referee: Pages

7 July 1935	FC Barcelona	11 – 1	Real Unión Club	Barcelona
	Escola 6' 8' 29' 32' 39' 43' 47' 56' 59'; Morera 30'; Fernandez 61'			Stadium: Les Corts; Referee: Baonza
