= 1933–34 FC Barcelona season =

35th season in existence of FC Barcelona

Barcelona
1933–34 season
- President: Joan Coma (until July 16, 1934); Esteve Sala (from July 16, 1934)
- Manager: Richard Kohn
- Stadium: Les Corts
- La Liga: 9th
- Catalan League: 3rd
- Copa del Rey: Quarter-finals
- Top goalscorer: League: Martín Ventolrà (13); All: Martín Ventolrà (21)

The 1933–34 season is FC Barcelona's 35th in existence. It covers the period from August 1, 1933 to July 31, 1934.

For the second year in a row, FC Barcelona ended the season without winning a title.

== First-team squad ==
Note: Flags indicate national team as defined under FIFA eligibility rules; some limited exceptions apply. Players may hold more than one non-FIFA nationality.

No.	Pos.	Nation	Player
—	GK	ESP	Juan José Nogués
—	GK	ESP	Ramón Llorens
—	GK	ESP	Manuel Cruz
—	DF	ESP	Ramón Zabalo
—	DF	ESP	Juan Rafa
—	DF	ESP	Esteban Pedrol
—	DF	ESP	Patricio Arnau
—	DF	ESP	Juan Villacampa
—	DF	ESP	José Saló
—	DF	ESP	Alejandro Espuny
—	DF	ESP	Francisco Alcoriza
—	MF	ESP	Valentín Font
—	MF	ESP	Carlos Bestit
—	MF	ESP	Ramón Guzmán

No.	Pos.	Nation	Player
—	MF	ESP	Severiano Goiburu
—	MF	ESP	Juan Trujillo
—	MF	ESP	Pascual Salas
—	MF	ESP	Agustín Costa
—	MF	ESP	Victoriano De Santos
—	MF	ESP	Salvador Soler
—	FW	ESP	Juan Ramón
—	FW	ESP	Mario Cabanes
—	FW	ESP	José Padrón
—	FW	ESP	Martín Ventolrà
—	FW	ESP	Francisco "Quico" Tejera
—	FW	ESP	Ramón Miranda
—	FW	CRC	Alejandro Morera

== Transfers ==
=== In ===
Note: Flags indicate national team as defined under FIFA eligibility rules; some limited exceptions apply. Players may hold more than one non-FIFA nationality.

No.	Pos.	Nation	Player
—	DF	ESP	Juan Villacampa
—	MF	ESP	Victoriano De Santos
—	MF	ESP	Pascual Salas
—	FW	CRC	Alejandro Morera
—	FW	ESP	Martín Ventolrà
—	FW	ESP	José Padrón

No.	Pos.	Nation	Player
—	DF	ESP	Alejandro Espuny
—	MF	ESP	Juan Trujillo
—	MF	ESP	Salvador Soler
—	FW	ESP	Mario Cabanes
—	FW	ESP	Francisco "Quico" Tejera
—	FW	ESP	Ramón Miranda

=== Out ===
Note: Flags indicate national team as defined under FIFA eligibility rules; some limited exceptions apply. Players may hold more than one non-FIFA nationality.

No.	Pos.	Nation	Player
—	GK	ESP	Manuel Vidal
—	DF	ESP	Cristóbal Martí (to Espanyol)
—	MF	ESP	Daniel Helguera (to Arenas)
—	MF	ESP	Salvador Artigas
—	MF	ESP	Vicente Piera
—	MF	ESP	Esteban Cifuentes
—	MF	ESP	Constantino Vela

No.	Pos.	Nation	Player
—	FW	ESP	Victorio Cruz
—	FW	ESP	Joaquim Jordà
—	FW	ESP	Samuel Escrig
—	FW	ESP	Manuel Parera
—	FW	ESP	Ángel Arocha
—	FW	ESP	Miguel Gual

== Competitions ==
=== La Liga ===
==== League table ====
Pos	Team	Pld	W	D	L	GF	GA	GD	Pts
6	Oviedo	18	8	2	8	51	45	+6	18 (Note: Donostia finished ahead of Oviedo on head-to-head goal difference: Donostia–Oviedo 3–1, Oviedo–Donostia 3–2.)
7	Valencia	18	7	3	8	28	38	−10	17 (Note: Valencia finished ahead of Español on head-to-head points: Valencia–Español 1–0, Español–Valencia 2–2.)
8	Español	18	7	3	8	41	42	−1	17
9	Barcelona	18	8	0	10	42	40	+2	16
10	Arenas	18	3	4	11	18	49	−31	10

Source: BDFútbol
Rules for classification: 1) points; 2) head-to-head points; 3) head-to-head goal difference; 4) goal difference; 5) number of goals scored.

==== Results by round ====
Round	1	2	3	4	5	6	7	8	9	10	11	12	13	14	15	16	17	18
Ground	A	H	A	H	A	H	H	A	H	H	A	H	A	H	A	A	H	A
Result	L	W	L	L	L	W	W	L	W	W	L	W	L	W	L	L	W	L
Position	9	4	7	10	10	10	7	9	9	5	7	5	6	4	7	8	7	9

Source: Competitive matches
A = Away; H = Home; W = Win; D = Draw; L = Loss

==== Matches ====
5 November 1933 1	Oviedo	7–3	Barcelona	Oviedo
	Gallart 17'; Herrerita 30', 32'; Lángara 62', 72', 75' (pen.); Mugarra 88'	Report	Ventolrà 6', 8'; Miranda 23'	Stadium: Buenavista; Referee: Villaverde Fernández

12 November 1933 2	Barcelona	5–0	Espanyol	Barcelona
	Ventolrà 14'; Ramón 15', 50'; Morera 75', 77'	Report		Stadium: Les Corts; Referee: Castarlenas Mora

18 November 1933 3	Arenas	3–1	Barcelona	Getxo
	Yermo 2'; Helguera 3'; Barrios 48'	Report	Zabalo 41'	Stadium: Ibaiondo; Referee: Ostalé Gómez

26 November 1933 4	Barcelona	1–2	Madrid	Barcelona
	Morera 46'	Report	Olivares 9'; Regueiro 26'	Stadium: Les Corts; Referee: Vallana Jeanguenat

3 December 1933 5	Donostia	2–0	Barcelona	San Sebastián
	Urtizberea 42', 73'	Report		Stadium: Atotxa; Referee: Elizari Navarlaz

10 December 1933 6	Barcelona	5–2	Valencia	Barcelona
	Arnau 10', 87'; Ventolrà 25', 56'; Morera 82'	Report	Cervera 49', 62'	Stadium: Les Corts; Referee: Medina Toledo

17 December 1933 7	Barcelona	6–3	Racing de Santander	Barcelona
	Ventolrà 3', 23'; Goiburu 19', 60', 66'; Ramón 43'	Report	Arteche 7', 67'; Ruiz 54'	Stadium: Les Corts; Referee: Escartín Morán

24 December 1933 8	Athletic Bilbao	6–1	Barcelona	Bilbao
	Iraragorri 22', 82', 84'; Gorostiza 25', 32', 70'	Report	Morera 39'	Stadium: San Mamés; Referee: Escartín Morán

31 December 1933 9	Barcelona	5–1	Betis	Barcelona
	Ramón 27'; Ventolrà 51'; Goiburu 59', 81'; Morera 66'	Report	Unamuno 89'	Stadium: Les Corts; Referee: Ostalé Gómez

7 January 1934 10	Barcelona	2–0	Oviedo	Barcelona
	Padrón 40'; Ventolrà 49'	Report		Stadium: Les Corts; Referee: Melcón Bartolomé

13 January 1934 11	Espanyol	3–2	Barcelona	Barcelona
	Prat 17'; Iriondo 31'; Edelmiro II 72'	Report	Ventolrà 52', 84'	Stadium: Sarrià; Referee: Balaguer García

21 January 1934 12	Barcelona	4–0	Arenas	Barcelona
	Egusquiza 40' (o.g.); Egusquiaguirre 48' (o.g.); Ventolrà 53', 77'	Report		Stadium: Les Corts; Referee: Iglesias Gracia

28 January 1934 13	Madrid	4–0	Barcelona	Madrid
	Valle 7'; Samitier 20'; Regueiro 30'; Eugenio 50'	Report		Stadium: Chamartín; Referee: Vallana Jeanguenat

4 February 1934 14	Barcelona	4–0	Donostia	Barcelona
	Soler 15'; Morera 47'; Pedrol 73'; Padrón 75'	Report		Stadium: Les Corts; Referee: Melcón Bartolomé

11 February 1934 15	Valencia	2–0	Barcelona	Valencia
	Costa 17'; Vilanova 83'	Report		Stadium: Mestalla; Referee: Balaguer García

18 February 1934 16	Racing de Santander	3–1	Barcelona	Santander
	Pombo 15', 52'; San Miguel 58'	Report	Morera 68'	Stadium: El Sardinero; Referee: Steimborn Ludeuvik

25 February 1934 17	Barcelona	2–1	Athletic Bilbao	Barcelona
	Cilaurren 37' (o.g.); Morera 41'	Report	Bata 57'	Stadium: Les Corts; Referee: Ostalé Gómez

4 March 1934 18	Betis	1–0	Barcelona	Seville
	Unamuno 89'	Report		Stadium: Patronato Obrero; Referee: Sanchis Orduña

=== Copa del Rey ===
==== Round of 32 ====
11 March 1934 First leg	Constancia	0–1	Barcelona	Inca
			Padrón

18 March 1934 Second leg	Barcelona	2–0	Constancia	Barcelona
	Morera			Stadium: Les Corts

==== Round of 16 ====
25 March 1934 First leg	Barcelona	5–1	Sevilla	Barcelona
	Morera; Ventolrà; Pedrol; Cabanes			Stadium: Les Corts

1 April 1934 Second leg	Sevilla	3–2	Barcelona	Seville
			Ventolrà; Ramón	Stadium: Nervión

==== Quarterfinals ====
8 April 1934 First leg	Barcelona	1–2	Betis	Barcelona
	Ramón			Stadium: Les Corts

15 April 1933 Second leg	Betis	2–2	Barcelona	Seville
			Goiburu; Ventolrà	Stadium: Patronato Obrero

=== Catalan football championship ===
==== League table ====
Pos	Team	Pld	W	D	L	GF	GA	GD	Pts
2	Espanyol	14	9	2	3	40	22	+18	20
3	Barcelona	14	9	2	3	36	19	+17	20
4	Júpiter	14	7	1	6	29	23	+6	15

==== Matches ====
3 September 1933 1	Granollers	1–4	Barcelona	Granollers
			Goiburu; Morera

8 September 1933 2	Badalona	1–3	Barcelona	Badalona
			Ramón; Zabalo; Goiburu

10 September 1933 3	Girona	2–2	Barcelona	Girona
			Ramón; Ventolrà

17 September 1933 4	Júpiter	2–3	Barcelona	Barcelona
			Bestit; Ramón	Stadium: La Vernenda

24 September 1933 5	Barcelona	3–5	Espanyol	Barcelona
	Ramón			Stadium: Les Corts

28 September 1933 6	Barcelona	7–0	Palafrugell	Barcelona
	Padrón; Miranda; Goiburu; Ventolrà; Morera			Stadium: Les Corts

1 October 1933 7	Sabadell	1–2	Barcelona	Sabadell
			Goiburu; Ramón	Stadium: Creu Alta

5 October 1933 8	Barcelona	2–1	Granollers	Barcelona
	Ramón; Salas			Stadium: Les Corts

8 October 1933 9	Barcelona	3–0	Badalona	Barcelona
	Ramón; Miranda			Stadium: Les Corts

12 October 1933 10	Barcelona	0–0	Girona	Barcelona
				Stadium: Les Corts

15 October 1933 11	Barcelona	3–1	Júpiter	Barcelona
	Ventolrà; Sans			Stadium: Les Corts

22 October 1933 12	Espanyol	3–1	Barcelona	Barcelona
			Sans	Stadium: Sarrià

29 October 1933 13	Palafrugell	1–0	Barcelona	Palafrugell
				Stadium: Camp del Casal

1 November 1933 14	Barcelona	3–1	Sabadell	Barcelona
	Morera; Ventolrà; Padrón			Stadium: Les Corts

== Results ==
Friendly

8 December 1933	FC Barcelona	4 - 1	Chile i Perú	Barcelona
	Sans 28' 50'; Artigas 32'; Goiburu 59'			Stadium: Les Corts; Referee: Mallorquí

25 December 1933	FC Barcelona	4 - 2	S.W. Donau	Barcelona
	Jorda 32'; Trujillo 47'; Alzamora 62'; Quico 78'			Stadium: Les Corts; Referee: Comorera

26 December 1933	FC Barcelona	2 - 0	Atlético de Madrid	Barcelona
	Goiburu 56'; Morera 73'			Stadium: Les Corts; Referee: Sola

1 January 1934	FC Barcelona	2 - 3	SK Slavia Praha	Barcelona
	Arnau 42'; Goiburu 67'			Stadium: Les Corts; Referee: Baonza

6 January 1934	FC Barcelona	2 - 3	SK Slavia Praha	Barcelona
	Quico 33'; Artigas 40'			Stadium: Les Corts; Referee: Pujol

13 February 1934	Gandia CF	1 - 2	FC Barcelona	València
			Morera	Stadium: Gandia; Referee: Gomez Juneda

8 March 1934	Sevilla FC	2 - 1	FC Barcelona	Sevilla
			Trujillo	Stadium: Nervion; Referee: Ocana

22 April 1934	FC Barcelona	4 - 2	Llevant	Barcelona
	Morera 18' 24' 26'; Ramon 31'			Stadium: Les Corts; Referee: Espelta

29 April 1934	FC Barcelona	4 - 1	CA Osasuna	Barcelona
	Morera; Ramon			Stadium: Les Corts

10 May 1934	FC Barcelona	2 - 1	Hèrcules CF	Barcelona
	Morera; Ramon			Stadium: Les Corts; Referee: Mallorquí

13 May 1934	FC Barcelona	6 - 4	Hèrcules CF	Barcelona
	Morera; Ramon; Trujillo			Stadium: Les Corts; Referee: Espelta

20 May 1934	FC Barcelona	3 - 2	Wiener SC	Barcelona
	Morera; Torredeflot			Stadium: Les Corts; Referee: Comorera

20 May 1934	FC Santboià	6 - 2	FC Barcelona	Barcelona
			Gomez; Trujillo	Stadium: Estadi Municipal Joan Baptista Milà

21 May 1934	FC Barcelona	5 - 1	Wiener SC	Barcelona
	Morera; Ramon; Raich			Stadium: Les Corts; Referee: Sola

27 May 1934	FC Barcelona	6 - 1	Tenerife	Barcelona
	Morera; Raich			Stadium: Les Corts; Referee: Mallorquí

31 May 1934	FC Barcelona	4 - 0	EC Granollers	Barcelona
	Trujillo 6' 26' 81'; Morera 21'			Stadium: Les Corts; Referee: Rovira

3 June 1934 Torneig La Balanguera	FC Barcelona	2 - 0	Girona FC	Barcelona
	Trujillo 62'; Raich 77'			Stadium: Les Corts; Referee: Santiago

10 June 1934	FC Barcelona	3 - 1	València CF	Barcelona
	Morera 50'; Raich 54'; Zabalo 84'			Stadium: Les Corts; Referee: Santiago

24 June 1934	FC Barcelona	4 - 2	Athletic Club	Barcelona
	Raich 4' 87'; Morera 41'; Goiburu 82'			Stadium: Les Corts; Referee: Baonza

1 July 1934	FC Barcelona	4 - 4	Select Brazil	Barcelona
	Raich; Morera; Ventolra			Stadium: Les Corts; Referee: Espelta

7 July 1934	CE Sabadell FC	3 - 3	FC Barcelona	Barcelona
			Escola; Raich	Stadium: Vic; Referee: Rovira

8 July 1934	FC Barcelona	4 - 2	Real Unión Club	Barcelona
	Chach 27'; Escola 30' 36'; Goiburu 89'			Stadium: Les Corts; Referee: Mallorquí
