= Enrique Fernández (footballer, born 1912) =

Uruguayan footballer (1912–1985)

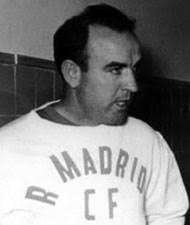
- Fernández managing Real Madrid

Personal information
- Full name: Enrique Fernández Viola
- Date of birth: 10 June 1912
- Place of birth: Montevideo, Uruguay
- Date of death: 6 October 1985 (aged 73)
- Place of death: Montevideo, Uruguay
- Position: Forward

Youth career
- 1929–1930: Uruguay Montevideo

Senior career*
Years	Team	Apps	(Gls)
1930–1931	Nacional	23	(8)
1931	Talleres RdE	2	(0)
1931–1932	Independiente	16	(5)
1933–1935	Nacional	41	(19)
1935–1936	Barcelona	17	(8)
1936–1937	Nacional	22	(8)
1939–1940	Nacional	0	(0)

International career
1933–1935	Uruguay	8	(1)
1935–1936	Catalan XI	3	(0)

Managerial career
- 1946: Nacional
- 1947–1950: Barcelona
- 1950–1952: Nacional
- 1953–1954: Real Madrid
- 1955–1956: Colo-Colo
- 1957–1959: Sporting CP
- 1959–1960: Real Betis
- 1961–1962: Uruguay
- 1962: Gimnasia La Plata
- 1964: River Plate
- 1965: Palestino
- 1966: Gimnasia La Plata
- 1967: Gimnasia La Plata
- 1967–1969: Uruguay
- * Club domestic league appearances and goals

Enrique Fernández Viola, commonly referred to as Enrique Fernández, (10 June 1912 – 6 October 1985) was a Uruguayan football player and manager who played for Nacional, Talleres (RE), Independiente, FC Barcelona, Uruguay and the Catalan XI. As a manager, he won two Uruguayan championships with Nacional and La Liga titles with both FC Barcelona and Real Madrid. Along with Radomir Antic, he is one of only two coaches to have taken charge of both FC Barcelona and Real Madrid and he is the only coach to have won La Liga titles with both. He was born in Montevideo, Uruguay.

== Career ==
=== Playing career ===
In January 1935, while playing for Nacional, Fernández helped Uruguay win the South American Championship. His teammates at both Nacional and Uruguay included Héctor Castro. He subsequently joined FC Barcelona and under coaches Franz Platko and Patrick O'Connell helped them win the Campionat de Catalunya twice and reach the final of the Copa de España. His teammates while playing for FC Barcelona included Joan Josep Nogués, Josep Escolà and Domènec Balmanya. Fernández and Balmanya made their La Liga debuts for Barça together on 10 November 1935 in a 1–0 defeat to RCD Español. He played 17 games for FC Barcelona in La Liga and scored 8 goals. Fernández scored a hat-trick against CA Osasuna in a 5–0 win on 29 March 1936 and then 2 against Athletic Bilbao on 4 April 1936. He played his final La Liga game on 19 April 1936 in a 2–2 draw against Hércules CF.

While at FC Barcelona, Fernández also played three times for the Catalan XI. On 19 January 1936 at the Les Corts, he played in a testimonial for Josep Samitier against SK Sidenice of Czechoslovakia. Other players in the Catalan XI that day included Sagibarba and Balmanya. His playing career at FC Barcelona was ended by the Spanish Civil War. When the war started, he was in Montevideo and the club advised him to stay there.

=== Coaching career ===
After retiring as a player due to a serious knee injury, Fernández began coaching and in 1946 he guided Nacional to a Uruguayan championship. In 1947 he returned to La Liga to coach CF Barcelona. With a squad including Velasco, Ramallets and Estanislao Basora, he helped the club win two La Liga titles in 1948 and 1949. During his third season the club also won its first ever major international trophy, the Latin Cup. Despite this, CF Barcelona could only finish fifth in La Liga and he was replaced the following season by Fernando Daucik.

Fernández rejoined Nacional and guided them to a second Uruguayan championship in 1950. He was appointed coach at Real Madrid for the 1953–54 season and with a team that included Alfredo Di Stéfano, Francisco Gento, Miguel Muñoz, Luis Molowny and Héctor Rial he guided the club to their first La Liga title since 1933. He managed Real for 10 games at the start of the 1954–55 season but was then replaced by José Villalonga.

Fernández also managed Real Betis for 10 games during the 1959–60 season. In July 1961 he also coached Uruguay in two World Cup qualifying games against Bolivia

== Honours ==
Nacional

- Primera División: 1933, 1934

Uruguay

- South American Championship: 1935

Barcelona

- Copa de España runner-up: 1936
- Campionat de Catalunya: 1934–35, 1935–36

=== Manager ===
Nacional

- Primera División: 1946, 1950.

Barcelona

- La Liga: 1947-48, 1948–49
- Latin Cup: 1949

Real Madrid

- La Liga: 1953–54

colo-colo

- Primeira division: 1956

sporting

- Primeira liga: 1957-1958
