= Josep Escolà =

Spanish footballer and manager

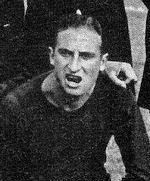
- Escolà before an El Clásico match in 1936.

Personal information
- Full name: Josep Escolà Segalés
- Date of birth: 28 August 1914
- Place of birth: Barcelona, Spain
- Date of death: 7 March 1998 (aged 83)
- Place of death: Barcelona, Spain
- Position: Forward

Youth career
- Sants

Senior career*
Years	Team	Apps	(Gls)
1932–1934	Sants	?	(?)
1934	Espanyol	?	(?)
1934–1937	Barcelona	51	(38)
1937–1939	Sète	26	(15)
1940–1948	Barcelona	115	(55)
Total		192	(108)

International career
1941–1945	Spain	2	(1)
1931–1948	Catalan XI	10	(2)

Managerial career
- 1949–1950: Badalona
- 1951–1952: Sabadell
- 1954–1955: Castellón
- 1955–1956: Levante
- * Club domestic league appearances and goals

Josep Escolà Segalés (28 August 1914 – 7 March 1998), also referred to as José Escolà, was a Spanish footballer who played as a forward. He spent most of his club career at FC Barcelona. Escolà also played for both Spain and the Catalan XI. After retiring as player in 1948, Escolà managed CF Badalona, CE Sabadell FC, CD Castellón and Levante UD.

== Playing career ==
=== Club ===
==== FC Barcelona ====
Born in Barcelona, Catalonia, Escolà made his La Liga debut for FC Barcelona under Franz Platko on 2 December 1934 and scored the fourth goal in a 4-0 win against Arenas Club de Getxo at Les Corts. During his debut season with the club, he helped them win the Campionat de Catalunya. Under Platko’s successor, Patrick O'Connell, and with a team that also included Domènec Balmanya, Joan Josep Nogués and Enrique Fernández, he helped the club win a further Campionat de Catalunya and reach the 1936 Copa del Presidente de la República Final. Barça played Madrid CF and with the Madrid club leading 2-1, Escolà was denied a late equalizer after a spectacular save by Ricardo Zamora.

==== Civil War and Exile ====
During the following season, 1936–37, national football was suspended because of the Spanish Civil War. However FC Barcelona and other clubs in the Republican area of Spain competed in the Mediterranean League and Escolà, Balmanya and O’Connell helped the club win this title. In 1937 FC Barcelona, including Escolà, Balmanya and O’Connell, went on a fund raising tour to Mexico and the United States. The club played fourteen games and opponents included Club América, Atlante F.C., Necaxa and a Mexican XI. In the United States, FC Barcelona played in and won a tournament against a Brooklyn XI, a New York XI and a Hebrew XI and then played a USA XI. In financial terms this tour saved the club, but O’Connell returned to Spain with only four players. The remaining players went into exile and Escolà and Balmanya signed for FC Sète in France.

==== FC Barcelona ====
After the Spanish Civil War ended in 1939, Francoist Spain imposed a six-year ban on any exiled sportsmen returning to Spain. However Enrique Piñeyro, the president of CF Barcelona, campaigned in favour of several of the club’s players and Escolà and Balmanya returned from exile in 1941. During their first season back, Barça, with Joan Josep Nogués now as coach, narrowly avoided being relegated after winning a play-off against Real Murcia. Despite this however the club managed to win the Copa del Generalísimo, with Escolà scoring their two opening goals, as they beat Atlético Bilbao 4–3 after extra time.

In 1943 Escolà also played in the controversial Copa del Generalísimo semi-final against Real Madrid. During the first-leg at Les Corts, which Barça won 3–0, he was severely kicked in the stomach and had to retire from the game. In the return leg they were beaten 11–1 at the Charmartín. It has been alleged that the Barça players, including Escolà, were pressurised into losing the game by supporters of Francoist Spain. However, the historian Bernardo Salazar interviewed both Escolà and Balmanya, who were part of the squad back then, and both denied these facts.

Towards the end of Escolà’s playing career with CF Barcelona, the squad was reinforced with among others, Mariano Martín, Josep Gonzalvo, Marià Gonzalvo, César, Velasco and later, Estanislao Basora and Antoni Ramallets. In his last years with the club, Escolà helped Barça win La Liga twice, under coach Josep Samitier in 1945 and under coach Enrique Fernández in 1948.

=== International ===
Between 1931 and 1948, Escolà also played 10 games and scored twice for the Catalan XI. The first of his two goals was scored in a 2–1 win against Brazil at Les Corts on 17 June 1934. He also played twice for Spain, both times against Portugal. Both games finished as 2–2 draws and Escolà scored on his debut on 12 January 1941. The second game was played on 11 March 1945.

== Honours ==
=== Player ===
Barcelona

- La Liga: 1944–45, 1947–48
- Copa del Rey: 1942; runner-up: 1936
- Supercopa de España: 1945
- Mediterranean League: 1937
- Campionat de Catalunya: 1934–35, 1935–36

=== Manager ===
Levante

- Tercera División: 1955–56

== Club statistics ==
- Continental includes the Catalan Championship and the Copa de Oro Argentina.

Club performance			League		Cup		Continental		Total	
Club	Season	Division	Apps	Goals	Apps	Goals	Apps	Goals	Apps	Goals
Barcelona	1934–35	La Liga	18	18	5	6	10	13	33	37
Barcelona	1935–36	La Liga	19	13	7	8	9	17	35	38
Barcelona	1936–37	La Liga	14	7	–		10	4	24	11
Barcelona	Total		51	38	12	14	29	34	92	86
FC Sète	1937–38	Ligue 1	16	9	1	3	–		17	12
FC Sète	1938–39	Ligue 1	10	6	1	0	–		11	6
FC Sète	Total		26	15	2	3	–		28	18
Barcelona	1940–41	La Liga	11	8	1	2	–		12	10
Barcelona	1941–42	La Liga	9	3	8	8	–		18	11
Barcelona	1942–43	La Liga	15	8	7	6	–		22	14
Barcelona	1943–44	La Liga	18	4	4	1	–		22	5
Barcelona	1944–45	La Liga	26	16	3	3	–		29	19
Barcelona	1945–46	La Liga	19	6	1	0	1	2	21	8
Barcelona	1946–47	La Liga	14	9	1	0	–		15	9
Barcelona	1947–48	La Liga	3	1	1	0	–		4	1
Barcelona	Total		115	55	26	20	1	2	142	77
Career total			192	108	40	37	30	36	263	181

== Sources ==
- Barça: A People’s Passion (1998), Jimmy Burns.
