= Baragaño =

Baragaño is a Spanish surname. Notable people with the surname include:

- Cesáreo Baragaño (1907–1970), Spanish footballer
- Fernando Garea Baragaño (born 1962), Spanish journalist
- José Álvarez Baragaño (1932–1962), Cuban writer
- María Cienfuegos Baragaño (born 2001), Spanish footballer
