= 1934–35 Campionat de Catalunya =

Campionat de Catalunya
- Season: 1934–35
- Champions: Barcelona
- Matches: 30
- Goals: 118 (3.93 per match)
- Top goalscorer: Josep Escolà (13 goals)
- Biggest home win: Barcelona 10–0 Júpiter (16 September 1934)
- Biggest away win: Badalona 0–3 Barcelona (23 September 1934); Júpiter 0–3 Sabadell (23 September 1934); Júpiter 1–4 Barcelona (28 October 1934)
- Highest scoring: Barcelona 10–0 Júpiter (16 September 1934)

The 1934–35 Campionat de Catalunya season was the 36th since its establishment and was played between 16 September and 25 November 1934.

== Overview before the season ==
Six teams joined the Division One league, including two that would play the 1934–35 La Liga and four from the 1934–35 Segunda División.

From La Liga

- Barcelona
- Espanyol

From Segunda División

- Badalona
- Girona
- Júpiter
- Sabadell

== Division One ==
=== League table ===
Pos	Team	Pld	W	D	L	GF	GA	GD	Pts	Qualification or relegation
1	Barcelona (C)	10	8	1	1	36	10	+26	17	
2	Sabadell	10	6	2	2	26	14	+12	14	
3	Júpiter	10	5	2	3	13	22	−9	12	
4	Espanyol	10	3	4	3	21	19	+2	10	
5	Girona (O)	10	2	2	6	10	17	−7	6	Qualification for the play-off league
6	Badalona (O)	10	0	1	9	12	36	−24	1	Qualification for the play-off league

Source: BDFútbol
Rules for classification: 1) points; 2) head-to-head points; 3) head-to-head goal difference; 4) goal difference; 5) number of goals scored
(C) Champions; (O) Play-off winners

=== Results ===
Home \ Away	BAD	FCB	ESP	GIR	JUP	SAB
Badalona	—	0–3	1–3	1–1	2–3	2–3
Barcelona	6–1	—	4–2	2–0	10–0	3–2
Espanyol	5–1	2–2	—	2–2	0–2	2–4
Girona	3–2	1–2	0–2	—	0–2	2–1
Júpiter	2–1	1–4	1–1	1–0	—	0–3
Sabadell	7–1	1–0	2–2	2–1	1–1	—

Source: BDFútbol
Legend: Blue = home team win; Yellow = draw; Red = away team win.

=== Top goalscorers ===
Goalscorers	Goals	Team
(Spain) Josep Escolà	13	Barcelona
(Spain) Miguel Gual	11	Sabadell
(Spain) Francisco Iriondo	8	Espanyol
(Spain) Manuel García	7	Júpiter
(Costa Rica) Alejandro Morera	6	Barcelona

== Play-off league ==
Pos	Team	Pld	W	D	L	GF	GA	GD	Pts	Qualification or relegation
1	Girona (C)	14	10	2	2	29	15	+14	22	Play-off winners
2	Badalona	14	10	1	3	49	23	+26	21	Play-off winners
3	Granollers	14	9	2	3	31	12	+19	20	
4	Horta	14	5	2	7	24	31	−7	12	
5	Sants	14	5	1	8	25	33	−8	11	
6	Terrassa	14	4	1	9	26	35	−9	9	
7	Sant Andreu	14	4	1	9	24	36	−12	9	
8	Calella	14	3	2	9	16	39	−23	8	

Source: BDFútbol
Rules for classification: 1) points; 2) head-to-head points; 3) head-to-head goal difference; 4) goal difference; 5) number of goals scored
(C) Champions

== Division Two ==
=== Group A ===
Pos	Team	Pld	W	D	L	GF	GA	GD	Pts	Qualification or relegation
1	Sants	10	8	0	2	32	17	+15	16	Qualification for the final group
2	Sant Andreu	10	6	0	4	36	19	+17	12	Qualification for the final group
3	Martinenc	10	6	0	4	26	22	+4	12	Qualification for the final group
4	Reus	10	5	1	4	18	20	−2	11	
5	Noia	10	2	1	7	15	38	−23	5	
6	Santboià	10	1	2	7	23	34	−11	4	

Source: BDFútbol
Rules for classification: 1) points; 2) head-to-head points; 3) head-to-head goal difference; 4) goal difference; 5) number of goals scored

=== Group B ===
Pos	Team	Pld	W	D	L	GF	GA	GD	Pts	Qualification or relegation
1	Terrassa	10	7	1	2	28	12	+16	15	Qualification for the final group
2	Tàrrega	10	5	1	4	24	23	+1	11	Qualification for the final group
3	Horta	10	5	0	5	22	21	+1	10	Qualification for the final group
4	Europa	10	4	1	5	21	21	0	9	Qualification for the final group
5	Manresa	10	4	1	5	22	20	+2	9	
6	Sant Cugat	10	3	0	7	15	35	−20	6	

Source: BDFútbol
Rules for classification: 1) points; 2) head-to-head points; 3) head-to-head goal difference; 4) goal difference; 5) number of goals scored

=== Group C ===
Pos	Team	Pld	W	D	L	GF	GA	GD	Pts	Qualification or relegation
1	Iluro	10	9	1	0	28	6	+22	19	Qualification for the final group
2	Granollers	10	7	0	3	32	18	+14	14	Qualification for the final group
3	Calella	10	5	3	2	12	10	+2	13	Qualification for the final group
4	Mollet	10	3	1	6	14	23	−9	7	
5	Poble Nou	10	1	2	7	17	23	−6	4	
6	Palafrugell	10	1	1	8	9	32	−23	3	

Source: BDFútbol
Rules for classification: 1) points; 2) head-to-head points; 3) head-to-head goal difference; 4) goal difference; 5) number of goals scored

=== Final group ===
Pos	Team	Pld	W	D	L	GF	GA	GD	Pts	Qualification or relegation
1	Granollers	18	12	1	5	48	31	+17	25	Qualification for the play-off league
2	Sants	18	12	1	5	45	24	+21	25	Qualification for the play-off league
3	Terrassa	18	11	1	6	38	31	+7	23	Qualification for the play-off league
4	Horta	18	8	3	7	38	36	+2	19	Qualification for the play-off league
5	Sant Andreu	18	7	5	6	36	30	+6	19	Qualification for the play-off league
6	Calella	18	7	4	7	39	36	+3	18	Qualification for the play-off league
7	Martinenc	18	6	3	9	29	42	−13	15	
8	Europa	18	6	1	11	24	36	−12	13	
9	Iluro	18	4	4	10	26	37	−11	12	
10	Tàrrega	18	5	1	12	28	48	−20	11	

Source: BDFútbol
Rules for classification: 1) points; 2) head-to-head points; 3) head-to-head goal difference; 4) goal difference; 5) number of goals scored
