= Domènec Balmanya =

Spanish footballer and manager (1914–2002)

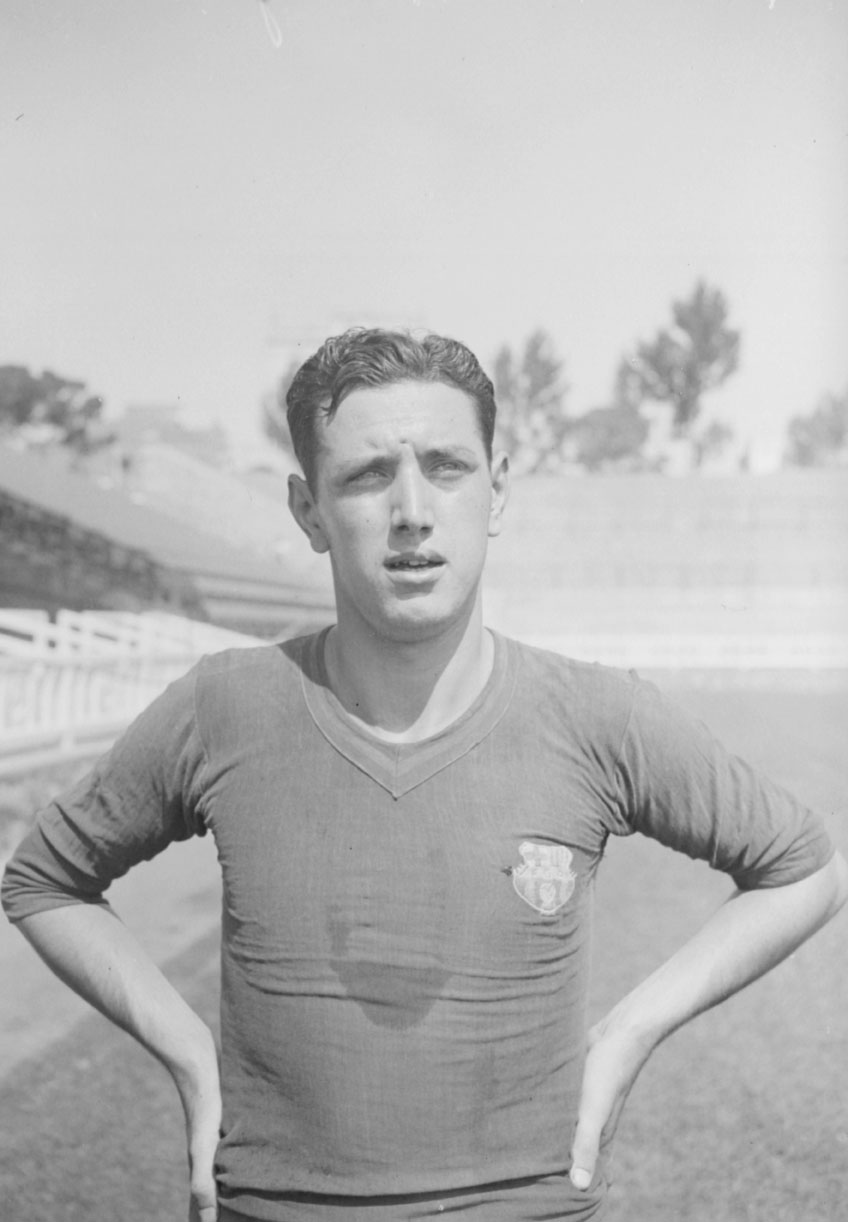

Personal information
- Full name: Domènec Balmanya Perera
- Date of birth: 29 December 1914
- Place of birth: Girona, Spain
- Date of death: 14 February 2002 (aged 87)
- Place of death: Barcelona, Spain
- Position: Midfielder

Senior career*
Years	Team	Apps	(Gls)
1933–1935	Girona		
1935–1937	Barcelona		
1937–1941	Sète		
1941–1944	Barcelona	48	(5)
1944–1948	Gimnàstic	3	(0)
1948–1949	Sant Andreu		
1949–1950	Gimnàstic	6	(1)

International career
1935–44	Catalan XI	4	(0)

Managerial career
- 1949–1952: Gimnàstic
- 1952: Girona
- 1952–1953: Zaragoza
- 1954–1955: Oviedo
- 1956–1958: Barcelona
- 1958–1960: Sète
- 1960–1962: Valencia
- 1963–1964: Betis
- 1964–1965: Málaga
- 1965–1966: Atlético Madrid
- 1966–1968: Spain
- 1970–1971: Zaragoza
- 1972–1974: Cádiz
- 1974–1976: Sant Andreu
- 1980: Sant Andreu
- * Club domestic league appearances and goals

Domènec Balmanya i Perera (Catalan pronunciation: [duˈmɛnəɡ bəlˈmaɲə]; 29 December 1914 – 14 February 2002), also referred to as Domingo Balmaña, was a former Spanish football midfielder and manager who spent most of his playing career at FC Barcelona. As a manager, he guided CF Barcelona to the a Copa del Generalísimo win in 1957. He then had moderately successful spells at Valencia CF, Real Betis and CD Málaga before he guided Atlético Madrid to a La Liga title in 1966. He subsequently managed Spain between 1966 and 1968. After retiring as a coach he worked as a director of sport at both RCD Espanyol and FC Barcelona and as a director at a Catalan coaching school. He also worked as a radio commentator.

== Playing career ==
Born in Girona, Catalonia, before joining FC Barcelona, Balmanya began his playing career with his hometown club, Girona FC. He made his La Liga debut with Barça on November 10, 1935, under coach Patrick O'Connell, in a 1–0 defeat to RCD Espanyol. During his time at Barcelona he played 111 games for the club in various competitions and among his early teammates were Joan Josep Nogués, Josep Escolà and Enrique Fernández. During his debut season, 1935–36, he helped the club win the Campionat de Catalunya and reach the Copa de España final. During the following season, 1936–37, national football was suspended because of the Spanish Civil War. However Barcelona and other clubs in the Republican area of Spain competed in the Mediterranean League and Balmanya and O’Connell helped the club win this title.

In 1937 Barcelona, including Balmanya, Escolà and O’Connell, went on a fund raising tour to Mexico and the United States. The club played fourteen games and opponents included Club América, Atlante F.C., Necaxa and a Mexican XI. In the United States, FC Barcelona played in and won a tournament against a Brooklyn XI, a New York XI and a Hebrew XI and then played a USA XI. In financial terms this tour saved the club, but O’Connell returned to Spain with only four players. The remaining players went into exile with Balmanya and Escolà joining FC Sète in France.

After the Spanish Civil War ended in 1939, the Francoist government imposed a six-year ban on any exiled sportsmen returning to Spain. However Enrique Piñeyro, the president of Barcelona, campaigned in favour of several of the club's players and Balmanya and Escolà returned from exile in 1941. During their first season back, Barça, with Joan Josep Nogués as coach, narrowly avoided being relegated after winning a play-off against Real Murcia. Despite this however the club managed to win the Copa del Generalísimo, beating Athletic Bilbao 4–3 after extra time.

Between 1935 and 1944, Balmanya also played 4 games for the Catalan XI. On 19 January 1936, at the Les Corts, he played in a testimonial for Josep Samitier against SK Sidenice of Czechoslovakia. Other players in the Catalan XI that day included Sagibarba

== Coaching career ==
Balmanya subsequently followed Nogués to Gimnàstic de Tarragona where he both finished his playing career and began his coaching career when he succeeded Nogués as coach in 1949. However his first appointment as coach ended in disappointment as Gimnástic were relegated in 1950. After spells at both Girona FC and Real Zaragoza, Balmanya found his first taste of success at Real Oviedo when he guided them to second place in Segunda División, Group 1 in 1955. However Real missed out on promotion after finishing only third in a play-off group.

Balmanya served as coach at FC Barcelona for two seasons between 1956 and 1958. With a squad including Velasco, Joan Segarra, Ramallets, Ladislao Kubala, Luis Suárez and Evaristo, he won the Copa del Generalísimo in 1957. However, during his two seasons with Barcelona, they finished third in La Liga on both occasions and in 1958 he was replaced by Helenio Herrera.

After two seasons in France with FC Sète, Balmanya returned to La Liga to take charge of Valencia CF in 1960 and in 1961 he helped them win their own summer trophy, the Trofeo Naranja. Guest player Sándor Kocsis scored in both games as Valencia beat Botafogo and Barcelona. He also guided the club to the 1962 Fairs Cup final. However the original final date clashed with the 1962 World Cup and was postponed. By the time the final was eventually played, Balmanya had moved on and he missed out on the club's 6–3 aggregate win over Barcelona.

During the 1963–64 season Balmanya was coach at Real Betis and he guided the club to third place in La Liga. He then coached CD Málaga for the 1964–65 season, helping them win promotion after they finished runners-up in Segunda División, Group 2 and then beat Levante UD in a play-off. He was then appointed coach at Atlético Madrid for the 1965–66 season and with a squad that included Enrique Collar, Miguel Jones, Adelardo and Luis Aragonés he won his only La Liga title. These successes saw him appointed coach of Spain and between 1966 and 1968 he was in charge of the national side for 11 games.

== Honours ==
=== Player ===
- Copa de España/Copa del Generalísimo: 1942, runners-up 1936
- Mediterranean League: 1937
- Campionat de Catalunya: 1935–36
- New York Tournament: 1937

=== Manager ===
Real Oviedo

- Segunda División, Group 1: runners-up 1955

Barcelona

- Copa del Generalísimo: 1957

Valencia

- Trofero Naranja: 1961

Málaga

- Segunda División, Group 2: runners-up 1965

Atlético Madrid

- Spanish Champions: 1966

== Bibliography ==
- Jimmy Burns. Barça: A People's Passion (1998).
