= Mediterranean League =

Football league played in Spain during the Spanish Civil War

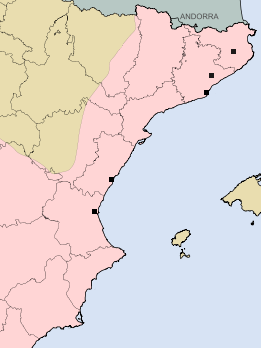
Map of league

The Mediterranean League, also referred to as the Lliga Mediterrània (Catalan), the Liga Mediterránea (Spanish) or La Liga del Mediterráneo, was a football league played in the Republican area of Spain during the Spanish Civil War. The league, played out in early 1937, was won by FC Barcelona. Clubs from the league also competed in a cup competition, the Copa de la España Libre. By 1938 the Republican area was divided and a second Mediterranean League season proved impossible to organise. However an alternative Lliga Catalana, also won by FC Barcelona, was arranged.

== Regional leagues ==
The Spanish Civil War, which began in July 1936, left Spain divided. Several La Liga clubs, including Sevilla FC, Real Betis, Real Sociedad, Athletic Bilbao, Celta de Vigo and Deportivo de La Coruña found themselves in areas under the control of Franco.

The Republicans controlled three major cities – Madrid, Barcelona and Valencia – and much of the surrounding countryside. They also controlled much of the Levante coast. As a result of this divide, La Liga was suspended. However, during late 1936, some regional leagues continued to be organised in the Republican areas. The Campeonato Levante featured teams from Valencia and Murcia. Participating teams included Valencia CF, Levante FC, Gimnàstico FC, Hércules CF, Murcia FC and FC Cartagena. Valencia CF emerged as champions with 13 points.

The Campionat de Catalunya was also contested between CE Espanyol, FC Barcelona, Girona FC, Granollers SC, CE Sabadell FC and CF Badalona. Both Madrid CF and Athletic Madrid had applied to join the Campionat de Catalunya, but their application was rejected by FC Barcelona. CE Espanyol emerged as champions with 14 points.

== The Mediterranean League ==
The Republican civil authorities also organised the Mediterranean League as an alternative to La Liga. It was intended to feature all twelve teams from both the Campeonato Levante and the Campionat de Catalunya. However Hércules CF, Murcia FC and FC Cartagena had to withdraw because their towns were bombarded. To even the balance between teams from Catalonia and Valencia, CE Sabadell FC and FC Badalona were also withdrawn and Atlético Castellón were invited to participate.

Despite Madrid being in the Republican area, neither Madrid CF or Athletic Madrid entered the Mediterranean League. The reasons for this are debatable. Their non-participation has been blamed both on internal divisions within the Republican ranks and the fact that Madrid remained closer to the frontline than either Barcelona or Valencia. The league was contested between January and May 1937. After 14 games FC Barcelona, with a team coached by Patrick O'Connell and featuring Domènec Balmanya and Josep Escolà, emerged as champions. CE Espanyol finished as runners-up and Girona FC, coached by Francisco Bru finished third. Valencia CF, who featured Lecue of Madrid CF as a guest player in their last two games, finished fourth and Levante FC finished fifth.

On September 28, 2007, FC Barcelona requested that the RFEF to recognise the Mediterranean League as a La Liga title. This action was taken after the Spanish Congress proposed to the RFEF to recognise Levante FC's Copa de la España Libre win as equivalent to Copa del Rey trophy. Nevertheless, the governing body of Spanish football has not made an outright decision yet.

On March 25, 2023, the RFEF conceded officially to Levante the Copa de la España Libre. Under these circumstances, Barcelona demanded over again from RFEF adding to its palmares the Mediterranean League contested in 1937 as equal to La Liga, given that this competition was achieved in the same conditions with the above. A decision, however, is yet to be made.

=== Final table ===
Teams	Played	Won	Drawn	Lost	GF	Ga	Pts
FC Barcelona	14	7	6	1	27	15	20
CE Espanyol	14	8	3	3	30	20	19
Girona FC	14	6	5	3	27	18	17
Valencia CF	14	7	3	4	32	23	17
Levante FC	14	5	6	3	30	18	16
Gimnàstico FC	14	3	4	7	18	31	10
Granollers SC	14	2	4	8	17	36	8
Atlético Castellón	14	0	5	9	7	27	5

== Liga Catalana ==
By the latter half of 1937 and early 1938 the war was going against the Republicans. In November 1937 their capital was transferred from Valencia to Barcelona and after the Battle of Teruel the Republican area was split in two. In football terms this meant that a second Mediterranean League was impossible as clubs from the Levante were unable to enter. Instead a Lliga Catalana, featuring just Catalan teams was organised. The competition was never completed due to disruption from the war but the title was subsequently awarded to FC Barcelona. The Barça coach Patrick O'Connell had returned from the tour of Mexico and the United States with only four players. Despite this, FC Barcelona won both the Lliga Catalana and the Campionat de Catalunya.

=== Table ===
Pos	Team	Pld	W	D	L	GF	GA	GD	Pts	Qualification
1	FC Barcelona (C)	17	14	1	2	85	26	+59	27	Champion (-2)
2	UE Sants	16	10	3	3	66	37	+29	23	
3	CE Europa	16	7	3	6	46	39	+7	17	
4	FC Martinenc	16	7	3	6	39	44	−5	17	
5	RCD Espanyol	16	6	4	6	45	44	+1	16	
6	Avenç	16	8	3	5	45	36	+9	14	(-5)
7	FC Badalona	15	4	1	10	32	50	−18	9	
8	CE Júpiter	17	4	2	11	28	76	−48	8	(-2)
9	Iluro SC	15	2	2	11	31	55	−24	6	
10	CE Manresa	2	0	0	2	4	14	−10	0	(Withdrew)

(C) Champions

== Sources ==
- Ball, Phil (2003). Morbo: The Story of Spanish Football. WSC Books. ISBN 0954013468.
- Burns, Jimmy (1998). Barça: A People's Passion. Bloomsbury. ISBN 0747545545.
- Martialay, Félix (2016). El fútbol en la guerra (Tomo VIII): Federación Catalana [Football in the war (Volume VIII): Catalan Federation] (in Spanish). Madrid: CIHEFE. ISBN 978-8494500985.
- "1937-38: Catalan League (Lliga Catalana)". RSSSF.
