= Cesáreo Baragaño =

Spanish footballer and manager (1907–1970)

Personal information
- Full name: Cesáreo Baragaño Álvarez
- Date of birth: 3 August 1907
- Place of birth: Mieres, Spain
- Date of death: 15 July 1970 (aged 62)
- Place of death: Spain
- Position: Midfielder

Senior career*
Years	Team	Apps	(Gls)
1927–1928	Racing de Sama		
1928–1934	Racing de Santander		
1934–1935	Real Betis		

Managerial career
- 1935: Racing de Sama
- 1942: Real Betis
- * Club domestic league appearances and goals

Cesáreo Baragaño Álvarez (3 August 1907 – 15 July 1970) was a Spanish footballer who played as a midfielder for Racing de Santander and Real Betis in the early 1920s. He later coached Betis in the 1942–43 season.

== Playing career ==
Born in the Asturias town of Mieres on 3 August 1907, Baragaño began his football career at Racing de Sama, from which he joined Racing de Santander in 1928, with whom he played for six years, until 1934, scoring a total of 8 goals in 50 La Liga matches, and playing a crucial role in the Racing team that finished runner-up in the 1930–31 La Liga season. He also played for Racing de Córdoba.

In 1934, Baragaño joined Real Betis, making his debut in a Mancomunado Levante-Sur Championship match against Hércules in September, which ended in a 1–0 loss. He went on to play one friendly and four Mancomunado matches during the fall of 1934, but a serious knee injury forced him to retire, thus not being officially a member of the Betis team that won the 1934–35 La Liga title, the only league title in club's history.

== Managerial career ==
That same season, Baragaño returned to his native Asturias, where he coached a few local teams, such as Racing de Sama in 1935, but without any experience in professional coaching. Nonetheless, in 1942, he replaced Patrick O'Connell as the new coach of Real Betis, but only because the club's directors were convinced to do so by O'Connell, who had worked with him in 1935. He oversaw 13 Betis matches, which ended in 1 win, 3 draws, and 9 losses as the club was relegated to the Segunda División. During one of those matches, Baragaño was forced to field an outfield player as the goalkeeper, ultimately choosing midfielder Francisco Gómez, who went on to replace Baragaño as the new coach of Betis in December 1942. The following month, in January 1943, in an interview to the Spanish newspaper Marca, he blamed his poor results on the fact that when he took charge, it was already "too late to start building a team that would honorably defend Betis' colors", stating that he even attempted to scout players on various places, but "others had gotten up earlier".

== Military career ==
Baragaño fought in the Spanish Civil War; in February 1938, he was a seargent, and in December 1938, he was a member of the second Disciplinary Battalion.

== Death ==
Baragaño died on 15 July 1970, at the age of 62.
