= Antonio Franco (footballer, born 1911) =

Spanish footballer and manager

Personal information
- Full name: Antonio Franco Florensa
- Date of birth: 25 October 1911
- Place of birth: Lleida, Spain
- Date of death: 30 June 1996 (aged 84)
- Place of death: Lleida, Spain
- Position: Midfielder

Senior career*
Years	Team	Apps	(Gls)
1932–1933	Espanyol	1	(0)
1933–1943	FC Barcelona	46	(1)

International career
1941–1942	Catalonia	3	(0)

Managerial career
- 1944–1947: Lleida
- * Club domestic league appearances and goals

Antonio Franco Florensa (25 October 1911 – 30 June 1996) was a Spanish professional football player and manager associated with Espanyol, FC Barcelona and Lleida.
