= Martí Ventolrà =

Spanish footballer

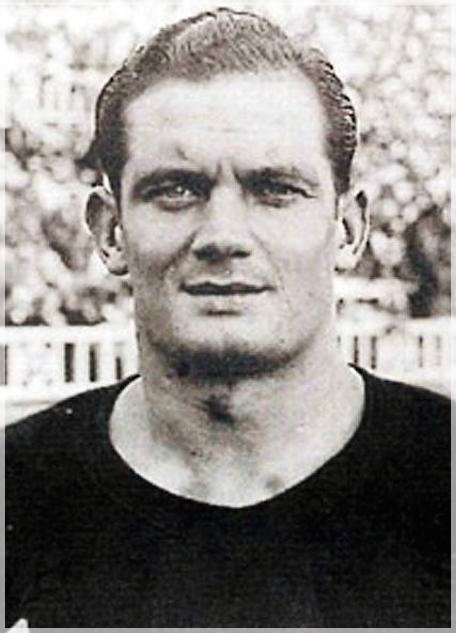
- Martí Ventolrá.

Personal information
- Full name: Martí Ventolrà Fort
- Date of birth: 16 December 1906
- Place of birth: Barcelona, Spain
- Date of death: 5 June 1977 (aged 70)
- Place of death: Mexico City, Mexico
- Height: 1.67 m (5 ft 5 1/2 in)
- Position: Winger

Youth career
- Fort-pienc
- Catalunya Les Corts

Senior career*
Years	Team	Apps	(Gls)
1924–1930	Español	30	(16)
1930–1933	Sevilla		
1933–1937	Barcelona	58	(31)
1939–1940	Real Club España		
1940–1949	Atlante		

International career
1930–1936	Spain	12	(3)
- * Club domestic league appearances and goals

Martí Ventolrà Fort (16 December 1906 — 5 June 1977) was a former Spanish footballer. He formed part of the forward set up of FC Barcelona which also included Raich, Escolà, Fernandez and Munlloch. He represented Spain at the 1934 FIFA World Cup.

== Career ==
Born in Barcelona, Ventolrà began playing youth football with local sides Fortpienc and Catalunya de Les Cortes. His first senior contract was with RCD Espanyol, and Ventolrà made his competitive debut for the club in 1925. He played for Espanyol through the 1929–30 La Liga season, winning the 1928–29 Copa del Rey during his time with the club.

A spell with Sevilla FC followed, and then Ventolrà joined his hometown's club FC Barcelona. He won the Campionat de Catalunya twice with Barcelona, and scored 31 goals in 58 La Liga matches, including scoring four goals against Real Madrid on 21 April 1935.

In 1937, Ventolrà emigrated to Mexico during the Spanish Civil War. He is the father of the Mexican footballer José Vantolrá.

== Personal ==
While he was playing football in Mexico, Ventolrà married Josefina Rangel Cárdenas, the niece of Mexico's President Lázaro Cárdenas. They had four children, Martín, Pepe, Guadelupe and Jorge. Martín and Pepe were professional footballers who played for Deportivo Toluca F.C., and Pepe played for Mexico at the 1970 FIFA World Cup finals.

Ventolrà's brother Josep was also a footballer who played for FC Barcelona.
