= Josep Raich =

Spanish footballer

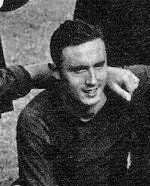
- Raich in 1936

Personal information
- Full name: Josep Raich Garriga
- Date of birth: August 28, 1913
- Place of birth: Molins de Rei, Spain
- Date of death: July 25, 1988 (aged 74)
- Place of death: Barcelona, Spain
- Position: Midfielder

Youth career
- Joventut FC

Senior career*
Years	Team	Apps	(Gls)
1932–1934	CE Júpiter		
1934–1936	FC Barcelona	40	(13)
1937–1938	FC Sète		
1938–1939	Troyes AC		
1940–1945	FC Barcelona	98	(4)

International career
1941	Spain	1	(0)
- * Club domestic league appearances and goals

Josep Raich Garriga (August 28, 1913 – 25 July 1988) was a Spanish footballer who played for Joventut FC, CE Júpiter and FC Barcelona in Spain and FC Sète and Troyes AC in France. He played once for Spain in 1941.

== Career ==
Born in Molins de Rei, Raich began playing football with local amateurs Joventut FC. He became a professional with FC Barcelona, where he made his La Liga debut during the 1933–34 season.

His hometown football club, Penya Blaugrana "Josep Raich" Molins de Rei, and its stadium were renamed in his honor in 1995.
