= Juan Zambudio Velasco =

Spanish footballer and coach

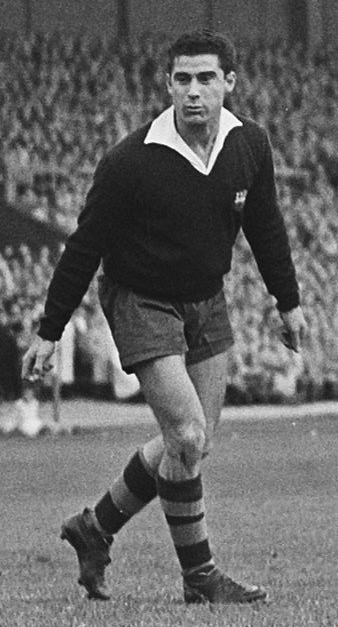
- Velasco in 1953

Personal information
- Full name: Juan Zambudio Velasco
- Date of birth: 21 November 1921
- Place of birth: La Alquería, Spain
- Date of death: 21 January 2004 (aged 82)
- Place of death: Igualada, Spain
- Position: Goalkeeper

Youth career
- Mollet

Senior career*
Years	Team	Apps	(Gls)
1940–1942	Mollet		
1942–1956	Barcelona	168	(0)
1955–1956	→ Sabadell (loan)		
1957–1958	Mercantil		
1958	Sabadell		

International career
1949	Spain B	1	(0)
1944–1948	Catalan XI	2	(0)

Managerial career
- 1958–1959: Sabadell
- 1960: Sabadell
- 1962–1963: Hospitalet
- 1963–1964: Europa
- 1964–1967: Sants
- 1968: Granollers
- * Club domestic league appearances and goals

Juan Zambudio Velasco (born 21 November 1921 in La Alquería, Murcia - died 21 January 2004 in Igualada, Barcelona) was a Spanish football goalkeeper. He played for Mollet and FC Barcelona. He retired playing in CE Sabadell FC.

He was contracted by FC Barcelona in 1942, when he was 21. He used to play wearing a cap, because the winter matches were scheduled at 3 p.m., in order to use natural light. He was the official goalkeeper of FC Barcelona until his eyes were injured. When he recovered, his place in the goal was strongly held by Antoni Ramallets, and he never returned to the main place.

In 1954 he left FC Barcelona to play in CE Sabadell FC, where he retired one season later. After retiring, he worked as the CE Sabadell FC coach.

He played with the Spanish B selection officially.

== Honours ==
FC Barcelona

- Spanish League: 1944–45, 1947–48, 1949–49, 1951–52, 1952–53
- Spanish Cup: 1950–51, 1951–52, 1952–53
- Latin Cup: 1949, 1952
- Copa Eva Duarte: 1948, 1952, 1953
- Zamora Trophy: 1947–48
