= Simón Lecue =

Spanish footballer

Personal information
- Full name: Simón Lecue Andrade
- Date of birth: 11 February 1912
- Place of birth: Arrigorriaga, Spain
- Date of death: 27 February 1984 (aged 72)
- Place of death: Madrid, Spain
- Height: 1.75 m (5 ft 9 in)
- Position: Attacking midfielder

Youth career
- Basconia

Senior career*
Years	Team	Apps	(Gls)
1930–1932	Alavés	36	(6)
1932–1935	Betis	55	(23)
1935–1942	Real Madrid	80	(24)
1942–1946	Valencia	77	(4)
1947	Hércules	0	(0)
1947–1948	Chamberí		
1948–1949	Zaragoza		
Total		248	(57)

International career
1934–1936	Spain	7	(1)
- * Club domestic league appearances and goals

Simón Lecue Andrade (11 February 1912 – 27 February 1984) was a Spanish footballer who played as an attacking midfielder.

== Club career ==
Born in Arrigorriaga, Biscay, Lecue played his first two La Liga seasons with Deportivo Alavés, also in the Basque Country. He made his professional debut at the age of 18, after being signed from CD Basconia.

Lecue joined Real Betis in 1932, contributing with nine goals in 21 games as the Andalusians won their first and only top division championship in 1934–35, under the guidance of Irish manager Patrick O'Connell. After that final third campaign, he left the club.

Subsequently, Lecue moved to Real Madrid where he continued to feature regularly, scoring a career-best 12 goals in his second year – the competition was not held from 1936 to 1939 due to the Spanish Civil War – with the team finally coming empty in silverware. After four seasons at Valencia CF, where he won his second league in 1944, he finished his career in 1949 at the age of 37, after brief spells with amateurs AR Chamberí and Real Zaragoza; in 13 top division campaigns, he amassed totals of 250 matches and 59 goals.

Lecue died in Madrid at the age of 72, after suffering a stroke whilst in his home.

== International career ==
Lecue earned seven caps for Spain during two years, scoring once. He was picked for the squad that appeared in the 1934 FIFA World Cup, with the national side exiting in the quarter-finals after losing against eventual champions (and hosts) Italy.

Lecue's debut was on 27 May 1934 precisely in that tournament, in a 3–1 first round win against Brazil in Genoa.

== Honours ==
Betis

- La Liga: 1934–35

Valencia

- La Liga: 1943–44

Real Madrid

- Copa del Rey: 1936
