= EC Granollers =

Spanish association football club

Granollers
- Full name: Esport Club Granollers
- Founded: 2 March 1913; 113 years ago
- Ground: Municipal Carrer Girona, Granollers, Catalonia, Spain
- Capacity: 2,500
- President: Xavier Abolafio Doncel
- Head coach: José Manuel Solivelles Brik
- League: Primera Catalana – Group 1
- 2024–25: Primera Catalana – Group 1, 5th of 16
Home colours	Away colours

Esport Club Granollers is a football team based in Granollers in the autonomous community of Catalonia. Founded in 1913, it plays in the Primera Catalana – Group 1. Its stadium is Municipal Carrer Girona with a capacity of 2,500.

== Season to season ==
Season	Tier	Division	Place	Copa del Rey
1928–29	6	2ª Reg.		
1929–30	6	2ª Reg.		
1930–31	5	1ª Reg. B		
1931–32	5	1ª Reg. B	3rd	
1932–33	5	1ª Reg. B	1st	
1933–34	3	3ª	3rd	
1934–35	4	1ª Reg.	1st	Fifth round
1935–36	4	1ª Reg.	1st	3rd – Group 4
1939–40	2	2ª	6th	
1940–41	3	3ª	3rd	
1941–42	3	1ª Reg. A	4th	
1942–43	3	1ª Reg. A	1st	
1943–44	3	3ª	7th	Third round
1944–45	3	3ª	8th	
1945–46	3	3ª	7th	
1946–47	3	3ª	7th	
1947–48	3	3ª	14th	
1948–49	4	1ª Reg. A	3rd	
1949–50	3	3ª	10th	
1950–51	3	3ª	14th	

Season	Tier	Division	Place	Copa del Rey
1951–52	3	3ª	7th	
1952–53	3	3ª	9th	
1953–54	3	3ª	17th	
1954–55	3	3ª	6th	
1955–56	3	3ª	1st	
1956–57	3	3ª	15th	
1957–58	3	3ª	13th	
1958–59	3	3ª	17th	
1959–60	3	3ª	3rd	
1960–61	3	3ª	14th	
1961–62	3	3ª	9th	
1962–63	3	3ª	7th	
1963–64	3	3ª	10th	
1964–65	3	3ª	9th	
1965–66	3	3ª	12th	
1966–67	3	3ª	12th	
1967–68	3	3ª	15th	
1968–69	4	Reg. Pref.	13th	
1969–70	4	Reg. Pref.	2nd	
1970–71	4	Reg. Pref.	3rd	

Season	Tier	Division	Place	Copa del Rey
1971–72	4	Reg. Pref.	7th	
1972–73	4	Reg. Pref.	7th	
1973–74	4	Reg. Pref.	2nd	
1974–75	4	Reg. Pref.	10th	
1975–76	4	Reg. Pref.	19th	
1976–77	5	1ª Reg.	1st	
1977–78	5	Reg. Pref.	3rd	
1978–79	5	Reg. Pref.	13th	
1979–80	5	Reg. Pref.	5th	
1980–81	5	Reg. Pref.	18th	
1981–82	5	Reg. Pref.	11th	
1982–83	5	Reg. Pref.	2nd	
1983–84	4	3ª	5th	
1984–85	4	3ª	9th	Second round
1985–86	4	3ª	7th	
1986–87	4	3ª	14th	
1987–88	4	3ª	20th	
1988–89	5	Reg. Pref.	8th	
1989–90	5	Reg. Pref.	5th	
1990–91	5	Reg. Pref.	2nd	

Season	Tier	Division	Place	Copa del Rey
1991–92	4	3ª	8th	
1992–93	4	3ª	10th	Second round
1993–94	4	3ª	17th	
1994–95	4	3ª	16th	
1995–96	4	3ª	12th	
1996–97	4	3ª	20th	
1997–98	5	1ª Cat.	15th	
1998–99	5	1ª Cat.	14th	
1999–2000	5	1ª Cat.	14th	
2000–01	5	1ª Cat.	13th	
2001–02	5	1ª Cat.	1st	
2002–03	4	3ª	11th	
2003–04	4	3ª	4th	
2004–05	4	3ª	8th	
2005–06	4	3ª	20th	
2006–07	5	1ª Cat.	18th	
2007–08	6	Pref. Terr.	5th	
2008–09	6	Pref. Terr.	10th	
2009–10	6	Pref. Terr.	9th	
2010–11	6	Pref. Terr.	12th	

Season	Tier	Division	Place	Copa del Rey
2011–12	6	2ª Cat.	1st	
2012–13	5	1ª Cat.	14th	
2013–14	5	1ª Cat.	6th	
2014–15	5	1ª Cat.	2nd	
2015–16	4	3ª	17th	
2016–17	4	3ª	8th	
2017–18	4	3ª	17th	
2018–19	4	3ª	10th	
2019–20	4	3ª	9th	
2020–21	4	3ª	3rd / 6th	
2021–22	5	3ª RFEF	14th	
2022–23	6	1ª Cat.	5th	
2023–24	6	Lliga Elit	14th	
2024–25	7	1ª Cat.	5th	
2025–26	7	1ª Cat.		

- 1 season in Segunda División
- 47 seasons in Tercera División
- 1 season in Tercera División RFEF

== Notable coaches ==
- (Spain) Juan Zambudio Velasco
