= Patrick O'Connell (footballer) =

Irish footballer (1887–1959)

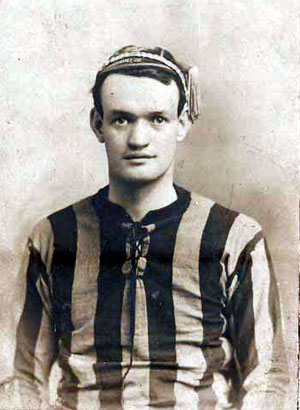

Personal information
- Full name: Patrick Joseph O'Connell
- Date of birth: 8 March 1887
- Place of birth: Dublin, Ireland
- Date of death: 27 February 1959 (aged 71)
- Place of death: St Pancras, London, England
- Height: 5 ft 10 in (1.78 m)
- Position: Wing half

Youth career
- Frankfort
- Stranville Rovers
- Liffey Wanderers

Senior career*
Years	Team	Apps	(Gls)
1905–1909	Belfast Celtic		
1909–1912	Sheffield Wednesday	18	(0)
1912–1914	Hull City	58	(1)
1914–1919	Manchester United	34	(2)
1915	→ Clapton Orient (guest)		
1918–1919	→ Rochdale (guest)		
?	→ Chesterfield (guest)		
1919–1920	Dumbarton	31	(0)
1920–1922	Ashington	19	(1)

International career
1912–1919	Ireland	6	(0)

Managerial career
- 1921–1922: Ashington
- 1922–1929: Racing Santander
- 1929–1931: Real Oviedo
- 1932–1935: Real Betis
- 1935–1940: Barcelona
- 1940–1942: Real Betis
- 1942–1945: Sevilla
- 1947–1949: Racing Santander
- * Club domestic league appearances and goals

Patrick Joseph O'Connell (8 March 1887 – 27 February 1959), also known as Paddy O'Connell or Patricio O'Connell, was an Irish football player and manager. A wing half, he played for Belfast Celtic, Sheffield Wednesday, Hull City and Manchester United. He has the distinction of being the first player from what is now the Republic of Ireland to play for and captain Manchester United.

As an international, he captained Ireland and was a member of the team that won the 1914 British Home Championship. However, O'Connell is probably best remembered for managing several clubs in La Liga. In 1935 he led Real Betis to their first La Liga title, and during the Spanish Civil War he took Barcelona on a tour of North America. Despite these successes, he died destitute in London in 1959 and was initially buried in an unmarked grave at St Mary's Catholic Cemetery, Kensal Green, London NW6.

== Early life ==
O'Connell was born in 11 Jones Terrace, Dublin. From the age of 14, he worked at Boland's Mill and became a foreman at the age of 15. He also played junior football with several local Dublin clubs, including Frankfort, Stranville Rovers and Liffey Wanderers, before joining Belfast Celtic. In March 1909, O'Connell and left-back Peter Warren were transferred to Sheffield Wednesday for a combined fee of £50.

== Playing career ==
=== Club ===
==== Sheffield Wednesday ====
A terrific performer in the heart of the defence, O'Connell made his English First Division debut for Sheffield Wednesday against Bury on the last day of the 1908–09 season. However, in subsequent seasons, he was unable to establish himself as a regular in the Wednesday first team, due to competition from English McConnell, Jimmy Spoors and Bob McSkimming. As a result, he made just 21 senior appearances, 18 in the league and three in the FA Cup. However, while with Wednesday, O'Connell made two of his six international appearances for Ireland.

==== Hull City ====
O'Connell left Sheffield Wednesday for Hull City in March 1912, and subsequently made 58 Second Division appearances for City during the 1912–13 and 1913–14 seasons. While with City, he also made a further three appearances for Ireland.

==== Manchester United ====
O'Connell's impressive performances with Ireland attracted the attention of Manchester United, for whom he signed in May 1914 for a fee of £1,000. During the 1914–15 season, he served as United team captain, made 34 First Division appearances and scored twice. He also played one further game for the club in the FA Cup. He made his league debut and scored his first goal for the club on 2 September 1914 in a 3–1 home defeat against Oldham Athletic. He scored his second goal on 10 April 1915 in a 2–2 home draw with Middlesbrough, and made his final English league appearance for the club on 26 April in a 1–0 home win against Aston Villa.

O'Connell's time at United saw the club finish third from bottom in the First Division, narrowly avoiding relegation by a single point. He also became embroiled in the infamous 1915 British football betting scandal. On 2 April 1915, relegation threatened United defeated mid-table Liverpool 2–0 in a home league game. It subsequently emerged that the game was fixed by a small group of players from both sides. David Goldblatt argues that the players' concern was not who went up or down the league, but due to the First World War, that there would be no league at all the following season. Believing they would soon be unemployed, the players arranged a betting pool and backed United to win 2–0. This was the score when O'Connell took a penalty which went well wide O'Connell escaped punishment, but three of his teammates – Sandy Turnbull, Arthur Whalley and Enoch West – and four Liverpool players later received lifetime suspensions from The Football Association. During the war, O'Connell remained a United player and also guested for Clapton Orient, Rochdale and Chesterfield.

==== Dumbarton ====
In August 1919, O'Connell moved to Dumbarton; during the 1919–20 season, he made 31 league appearances and played twice in the Scottish Cup. He made his Scottish League debut as a right-half in a 1–1 draw with Ayr United on 16 August 1919, the opening day of the season. His first three appearances for Dumbarton were at right-half, while all the rest were at centre-half, with the exception of the home game against Hamilton Academical on 27 September 1919, when he again played at right-half. He made his final appearance for Dumbarton in a 4–3 away defeat against Aberdeen on 24 April 1920.

==== Ashington ====
O'Connell finished his playing career with Ashington. During his first season with the club, 1920–21, they played in the North Eastern League and finished ninth out of twenty teams. The 1921–22 season saw O'Connell appointed player-coach, and Ashington playing in the English Division Three North. O'Connell oversaw massive changes at Ashington, as a result of the club's league status having changed. Their home ground was upgraded from a typical non-league venue containing no more than a simple seated and covered stand to a stadium designed for 20,000. O'Connell played in the club's first ever English League fixture, a 1–0 win against Grimsby Town in front of 9,000 supporters. Ashington eventually finished the season in a respectable tenth position, with O'Connell making his last appearance for the club in a 2–2 home draw against Southport. In January 1921, while with Ashington, O'Connell also represented the North Eastern League against the Central League.

=== International ===
Between 1912 and 1919, O'Connell played six times for Ireland. He made his international debut on 10 February 1912, in a 6–1 defeat against England at Dalymount Park. His teammates on the day included, among others, Billy Scott, Val Harris and Bill Lacey. On 16 March 1912, he also played in the 4–1 defeat against Scotland at Windsor Park. In 1914, together with Harris, Lacey, Louis Bookman and Billy Gillespie, he was a member of the Irish team that won the 1914 British Home Championship. After beating Wales 2–1 away on 19 January, Ireland then beat England 3–0 at Ayresome Park on 14 February. O'Connell then captained the team, while playing with a broken arm, as a ten-man Ireland clinched the title with a 1–1 draw against Scotland at Windsor Park on 14 March. He made his last appearance for Ireland in a 1919 Victory international against Scotland.

== Managerial career ==
=== Racing de Santander ===
In 1922, O'Connell succeeded Fred Pentland as the manager of Racing Santander. He subsequently guided the team to five regional titles, and in 1928, they became founding members of La Liga. He would later return to Racing for a second spell as manager between 1948 and 1949.

=== Real Oviedo ===
From September 1929 until May 1931, O'Connell managed Real Oviedo in the Segunda División.

=== Real Betis ===
Between 1931 and 1935, O'Connell managed Real Betis, at the time known as Betis Balompie. After leading them to the Segunda División title in 1932, he then guided Betis, with a team that included Lecue, to their one and only La Liga title in 1935. Betis won the title on 28 April 1935, with a 5–0 win against O'Connell's former team Racing Santander. The night before the game, which was played in Santander, O'Connell visited the Racing squad at a hotel where they were staying, and allegedly tried to persuade them to lose the game. Betis had to beat Racing to overtake their rivals Real Madrid.

=== FC Barcelona ===
O'Connell's success with Real Betis attracted the interest of Barcelona, who appointed him as successor to Franz Platko for the 1935–36 season. With a squad that included Josep Escolà, Domènec Balmanya, Joan Josep Nogués and Enrique Fernández, O'Connell guided Barça to the Campionat de Catalunya and the Copa de España final. In the final, they played Real Madrid and with Real leading 2–1, Escolà was denied a late equaliser after a spectacular save by Ricardo Zamora.

During the 1936–37 season, La Liga was suspended because of the Spanish Civil War. However, clubs in the Republican area of Spain competed in the Mediterranean League. In early 1937, Barcelona received an offer from a businessman, Manuel Mas Serrano, via one of their players, Josep Iborra. Serrano proposed that the club travel to play a series of exhibition matches in Mexico and the United States. According to the offer, the club would be paid $15,000 with all costs covered. This was to involve a Barcelona party of 20: 16 players, plus O'Connell, Ángel Mur, Rossend Calvet, the club secretary and Modest Amorós, the club doctor. In Mexico, they played against, among others, Club América, Atlante, Necaxa and a Mexican XI. In the United States, they played against Brooklyn Hispano, Brooklyn St. Mary's Celtic and an American Soccer League XI. They finished the tour with a game against a Hebrew XI.

Due to the financial success of this tour, Barcelona cleared their debts and saved the club; however, O'Connell returned to Spain with only four players, after the others chose to go into exile in Mexico and France. By the 1937–38 season, the Republican area was reduced in size, and a second Mediterranean League was impossible to organise. However, a Lliga Catalana, featuring just Catalan teams, was organised. Despite a depleted squad, O'Connell and Barcelona won both the Lliga Catalana and the Campionat de Catalunya.

=== Sevilla FC ===
O'Connell went on to manage Sevilla between 1942 and 1945. During his first season in charge, 1942–43, he guided the club to second place in La Liga.

== Legacy ==
A bust commemorating O'Connell's league title achievement with Real Betis was installed at the club's Estadio Benito Villamarín in 2017. It was organised by the Patrick O'Connell Memorial Fund, Alan McLean, Fergus Dowd and Simon Needham. A documentary about O'Connell and the Fund, by Michael Andersen was released in May 2018, with the support of the Memorial Fund. O'Connell's new memorial was installed by the fund in April 2016.

The memorial fund also unveiled a Dublin City Council plaque at 87 Fitzroy Avenue, Dublin where O'Connell lived in later years. A blue plaque was also unveiled by the group on Albert Street off the Falls Road in Belfast where he lived as a Belfast Celtic player. A mural was also commissioned by the POCMF on the Whiterock Road; painted by Belfast artists Danny Devenney and Marty Lyons.

A monument in Seville commemorates Real Betis's only La Liga title.

== Honours ==
=== Player ===
Ireland

- British Home Championship: 1914

=== Manager ===
Racing Santander

- Cantabrian Champions: 1923–24, 1924–25, 1925–26, 1926–27, 1928–29

Real Betis

- La Liga: 1934–35
- Segunda División: 1931–32

Barcelona

- Mediterranean League: 1937
- Lliga Catalana: 1937–38
- Campionat de Catalunya: 1935–36, 1937–38
