= Juan José Nogués =

Spanish Aragonese footballer (1909–1998)

Personal information
- Full name: Juan José Nogués Portalatín
- Date of birth: 28 March 1909
- Place of birth: Borja, Zaragoza, Aragón, Spain
- Date of death: 2 July 1998 (aged 89)
- Height: 1.76 m (5 ft 9 in)
- Position: Goalkeeper

Senior career*
Years	Team	Apps	(Gls)
1928–1930	Zaragoza C.D.		
1930–1936	Barcelona	83	(0)
1939–1941	Barcelona	31	(0)

International career
1932–1941	Catalan XI	10	(0)
1934	Spain	1	(0)

Managerial career
- 1942–1944: Barcelona
- 1944–1950: Gimnàstic
- 1950–1952: Español
- 1952–1954: Sporting Gijón
- 1954–1955: Lleida
- 1955–1956: Gimnàstic
- 1957–1958: Gimnàstic
- 1960–1962: Gimnàstic
- 1966–1967: Gimnàstic
- * Club domestic league appearances and goals

Juan José Nogués Portalatín (28 March 1909 – 2 July 1998), also known as Joan Josep Nogués, was a Spanish Aragonese footballer and manager. During the 1930s and 1940s, he played as a goalkeeper for FC Barcelona, the Catalan XI and Spain. He later became manager of several La Liga clubs including CF Barcelona, Gimnàstic de Tarragona and RCD Español.

== Playing career ==
He was keeper from Zaragoza C.D. (known as Tomates -named Tomatoes because of their all red uniform-, team that merged with Iberia to create R. Zaragoza in 1932). Nogués made his La Liga debut for FC Barcelona on 12 December 1930 in a 1–1 draw with Racing de Santander. During his playing career with the club he helped them win the Campionat de Catalunya five times. Between 1932 and 1941 he also played 10 games for the Catalan XI. On 14 February 1934 he played against Spain at Les Corts. Spain, who were preparing for the 1934 World Cup, won 2–0. Nogués was subsequently included in the Spain squad for the World Cup. He played his only game for Spain in a quarter-final replay against Italy on 1 June 1934, replacing Ricardo Zamora who had been injured in the first game. After the World Cup was over, Brazil, with a team that included Leônidas, played the Catalan XI twice before going home and Nogués played in both games. On 17 June the Catalan XI beat Brazil 2–1 at Les Corts and then on 24 June they held them to a 2–2 draw in Girona.

== Coaching career ==
After retiring as a player, Nogués took over as manager at FC Barcelona during the 1941–42 season. The season had seen Barça, with a team that included Domènec Balmanya, struggle in La Liga, narrowly avoiding being relegated after winning a play-off against Real Murcia. Despite this however the club managed to win the Copa del Generalísimo, beating Atlético Bilbao 4–3 after extra time. During the 1942–43 season Nogués led Barça to third in La Liga and to the Copa del Generalísimo semi-final. In the semi-final they were drawn against Real Madrid and after winning the first-leg 3–0 at Les Corts they were controversially beaten 11–1 at the Charmartín. It has been alleged that the Barça players were pressured into losing the game by supporters of Francoist Spain.

Nogués subsequently coached Gimnàstic de Tarragona during their seasons in La Liga during the 1940s. In 1947 Gimnàstic also reached the Copa del Generalísimo semi-final but lost to RCD Español. In the quarter-finals they had beaten FC Barcelona. They finished their debut La Liga season, 1947–48, in seventh place with the highlight coming on 11 January 1948 when they beat Real Madrid 3–1 at the Bernabéu. As a result, they became the first team to beat Real at the Bernabéu and are still the only team to win there on their first visit.

== Honours ==
=== Player ===
Barcelona

- Campionat de Catalunya: 1930, 1931, 1932, 1935, 1936

=== Manager ===
Barcelona

- Copa del Generalísimo: 1942
