= Ramón Zabalo =

Spanish footballer (1910–1967)

Personal information
- Full name: Ramón de Zabalo y Zubiaurre
- Date of birth: 10 June 1910
- Place of birth: South Shields, England
- Date of death: 2 January 1967 (aged 56)
- Place of death: Viladecans, Spanish State
- Position: Defender

Youth career
- UE Avant Fort Pienc
- UA Horta

Senior career*
Years	Team	Apps	(Gls)
1929–1937	Barcelona	88	(5)
1937–1944	RC Paris		
1944–1945	Barcelona	1	(0)

International career
1931–1936	Spain	11	(0)
- * Club domestic league appearances and goals

Ramón De Zabalo Zubiaurre (10 June 1910 – 2 January 1967) was a British-born Spanish footballer who played for FC Barcelona in Spain and RC Paris in France. He represented Spain at the 1934 FIFA World Cup.

== See also ==
- List of Spain international footballers born outside Spain
