= Camp de Les Corts =

Former stadium of FC Barcelona

Coordinates: 41°23′09″N 2°08′08″E

Les Corts
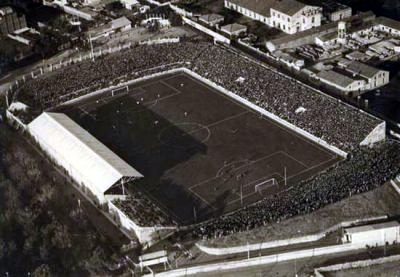
- Camp de Les Corts in 1930
- Interactive map of Les Corts
- Full name: Camp de les Corts
- Owner: FC Barcelona
- Operator: FC Barcelona; CD Condal
- Capacity: 60,000
- Surface: Grass
- Field size: 101 m × 62 m (331 ft × 203 ft)
- Acreage: 26,990 m^{2} (290,500 sq ft)

Construction
- Opened: 20 May 1922
- Expanded: 1926
- Demolished: 2 February 1966; 60 years ago
- Architects: Jaume Mestres; Josep Alemany

Tenants
- FC Barcelona (1922–1957); CD Condal (1934–1970)

Camp de Les Corts (Catalan pronunciation: [ˈkam də ləs ˈkoɾts]), commonly referred to as Les Corts, was a sports stadium in Barcelona, Catalonia, Spain. Opened in 1922, it was the home for FC Barcelona until the club moved to the Camp Nou in 1957. It was also the home of CD Condal for the club's entire history.

== Overview ==
Les Corts was built as a result of a long-term plan by the club president, Joan Gamper, to provide FC Barcelona with its own stadium. It replaced the Camp de la Indústria as the home of FC Barcelona. Inaugurated in 1922, the initial capacity was 20,000. The first game played at the ground was between FC Barcelona and St Mirren. On 13 May 1923, the stadium hosted the Copa del Rey final between Athletic Bilbao and CE Europa and on 21 December 1924 Les Corts hosted a game between Spain and Austria.

On 14 June 1925, the stadium was the scene of an incident that saw it closed for six months. During a game, FC Barcelona fans jeered the Spanish national anthem and then applauded God Save the King, performed by a visiting British Royal Marine band. The dictatorship of Primo de Rivera accused Joan Gamper of promoting Catalan nationalism. Les Corts was shut down and Gamper was expelled from Spain.

The stadium was the home of FC Barcelona during two of its most successful eras. During the 1920s with coach Jack Greenwell and players such as Paulino Alcántara, Sagibarba, Ricardo Zamora, Josep Samitier, Félix Sesúmaga and Franz Platko, the club dominated the Campionat de Catalunya and emerged as one of the top clubs in Spain. The club built on that success and also won the first ever La Liga while based at Les Corts.

By the late 1940s, FC Barcelona had outgrown Les Corts. The stadium had been extended on several occasions, reaching a final capacity of 60,000. However, there was no room for further expansion and in 1950 the club began to make plans for a new stadium, the Camp Nou. The club moved to its new stadium upon its inauguration on 24 September 1957.

After the closure of Les Corts, the club began a long, ultimately successful, process to rezone the property to allow for residential and commercial use. Demolition of the old stadium began on 2 February 1966. Of the 26,990 m^{2} (290,500 sq ft) property, 15,300 m^{2} (165,000 sq ft) were then rebuilt as parks and sports facilities (basketball and hockey courts, swimming pools, etc.). Residential and commercial buildings were erected on the rest of the site.
