= 1939–40 FC Barcelona season =

41st season in existence of FC Barcelona

FC Barcelona
1939–40 season
- President: Joan Soler (until march); Enrique Piñeyro
- Manager: Josep Planas
- La Liga: Ninth
- Copa del Generalissimo: Quarter finals
- Campionat de Catalunya: Third

The 1939–40 season was the 41st season for FC Barcelona.

== Squad ==
			Total		La Liga		Copa del Generalíssimo		Campionat de Catalunya	
Position	Player	Country	PT	Goals	PT	Goals	PT	Goals	PT	Goals
GK	Juan José Nogués	(Spain)	31	-53	19	-34	5	-3	7	-16
GK	Luis Miró	(Catalonia)	7	-10	3	-4	1	-2	3	-4
DF	Francisco Garcerán	(Spain)	19		18		1			
DF	Francisco Ribas	(Catalonia)	19		14		5			
DF	Abelardo Riera	(Spain)	15		9		4		2	
DF	Joan Babot	(Catalonia)	9						9	
DF	Martín Pica	(Spain)	9						9	
DF	Miguel Ángel Valcárcel	(Spain)	2		2					
DF	Josep Saló	(Catalonia)	2				2			
DF	Joan Rafa	(Catalonia)	1						1	
DF	Benito García	(Spain)	0							
MF	Manuel Rosalén	(Catalonia)	28	1	17	1	5		6	
MF	Salvador Soler	(Catalonia)	13		11				2	
MF	Antonio Franco	(Catalonia)	13		9		2		2	
MF	Joan Muntaner	(Cuba)	10		9		1			
MF	Josep Bardina	(Catalonia)	9	1					9	1
MF	Josep Argemí	(Catalonia)	8						8	
MF	Benito García	(Spain)	5				5			
MF	Nicolás Santacatalina	(Valencian Community)	4				4			
MF	Francisco Calvet	(Catalonia)	2	2	2	2				
MF	Francisco Virgós	(Catalonia)	1						1	
MF	Emilín	(Spain)	30	12	16	5	4	2	10	5
FW	Herrerita	(Spain)	25	14	17	8			8	6
FW	Aurelio León	(Catalonia)	25	3	20		2		3	3
FW	Jaume Sospedra	(Catalonia)	23	5	17	3	6	2		
FW	Ramon Homedes	(Cuba)	20	1	17	1			3	
FW	Hilario	(Spain)	13	4	6	1			7	3
FW	Pedro Pascual	(Argentina)	11	6	8	4			3	2
FW	Manuel Fuentes	(Spain)	10	5	8	2			2	3
FW	Mariano Martín	(Spain)	9	2	3		6	2		
FW	Antoni Gràcia	(Catalonia)	8	3	3		5	3		
FW	Juan Rocasolano	(Spain)	8	1	8	1				
FW	César Rodríguez	(Spain)	5	1					5	1
FW	Salvador Galvany	(Catalonia)	5	1			5	1		
FW	Josep Pagès	(Catalonia)	4	2					4	2
FW	Pachi	(Spain)	4	1	4	1				
FW	Ramon Mayoral	(Catalonia)	3						3	
FW	Jaume Rigual	(Catalonia)	3	3					3	3
FW	Máximo Aylagas	(Spain)	3	4			3	4		

== Results ==
Friendly

1 September 1939	CD Granollers	0 - 7	FC Barcelona	Granollers
			Mariano Martín; Valle; Sospedra

2 September 1939	CE Manresa	1 - 3	FC Barcelona	Manresa
			Rigual; César	Stadium: El Pujolet

9 September 1939	Artes	1 - 8	FC Barcelona
			Homedes; Rigual; César

9 September 1939	Hércules CF	3 - 1	FC Barcelona	Alacant
			Olive

11 September 1939	UE Olot	2 - 5	FC Barcelona	Olot
			Olive; Homedes; Calvet; Rigual

8 October 1939	CF Vilanova	2 - 4	FC Barcelona	Vilanova
			Homedes; J.Estrada; Rigual

12 October 1939	UE Vic	3 - 1	FC Barcelona	Vic
			Olive

29 October 1939 Campionat Catalunya Reserves	Sant Andreu	0 - 2	FC Barcelona	Sant Andreu
			Barreda; Sole

1 November 1939 A benefici de la Mutua esportiva de catalunya	FC Barcelona	3 - 0	CD Granollers	Barcelona
	Fuentes; César			Stadium: Camp de les Corts; Referee: Vilalta

19 November 1939 Campionat Catalunya Reserves	Hércules CF	1 - 7	FC Barcelona	Alacant
			Pages; Sendra; Pascual; Calvet; Olive

3 December 1939 Campionat Catalunya Reserves	FC Martinenc	1 - 1	FC Barcelona	Sant Marti
			Guinovart

8 December 1939	FC Barcelona	1 - 2	UE Sants	Barcelona
	Olive			Stadium: Camp de les Corts

24 December 1939 Campionat Catalunya Reserves	CF Badalona	3 - 3	FC Barcelona	Badalona
			Riba; Garza

26 December 1939	Real Murcia	3 - 4	FC Barcelona	Múrcia
			Pascual; Emilín; Olive	Stadium: La Condomina; Referee: Rosello

31 December 1939 Campionat Catalunya Reserves	CE Sabadell FC	2 - 0	FC Barcelona	Sabadell

14 January 1940 Campionat Catalunya Reserves	FC Barcelona	2 - 1	UE Sants	Barcelona
	Sendra; Olive			Stadium: Camp de les Corts

21 January 1940 Campionat Catalunya Reserves	FC Barcelona	1 - 2	Sant Andreu	Barcelona
	Sendra			Stadium: Camp de les Corts

1 April 1940 Campionat Catalunya Reserves	FC Barcelona	1 - 4	Sant Andreu	Barcelona
	Pachi			Stadium: Camp de les Corts; Referee: Grau

2 May 1940	FC Barcelona	1 - 0	CD Castellón	Barcelona
	Aylagas			Stadium: Camp de les Corts; Referee: Ferrer

2 May 1940	UE Figueres	6 - 1	FC Barcelona	Figueres
			Miranda	Referee: Esteve

3 May 1940	UE Figueres	1 - 5	FC Barcelona	Figueres
			Sospedra; Gracia; Brunet

5 May 1940	Sant Andreu	2 - 8	FC Barcelona	Sant Andreu
			Gracia; Galbani; Aylagas; Martín	Referee: Hernandez

12 May 1940	UE Lleida	2 - 3	FC Barcelona	Lleida

15 May 1940	FC Mollerussa	1 - 3	FC Barcelona	Mollerussa

19 May 1940	CD Castellón	3 - 1	FC Barcelona	Castellón

16 June 1940 Homenatge Cholin	Real Sociedad	2 - 2	FC Barcelona	Sant Sebastià
			Martín; Bravo	Stadium: Estadi d'Atotxa; Referee: Jauregui

23 June 1940	FC Barcelona	6 - 2	Real Sociedad	Barcelona
	Martín; Gracia; Franco; Aylagas			Stadium: Camp de les Corts; Referee: Coll

24 June 1940	UE Sants	5 - 1	FC Barcelona	Barcelona
			Homedes	Stadium: Galileo; Referee: Esteve

29 June 1940	FC Barcelona	2 - 3	Athletic Club	Barcelona
	Homedes; Galvany			Stadium: Camp de les Corts; Referee: Sola

30 June 1940	CE Mataró	1 - 1	FC Barcelona	Mataro
			Rocasolano	Referee: Tarros

30 June 1940	FC Barcelona	3 - 2	Athletic Club	Barcelona
	Martín; Sospedra			Stadium: Camp de les Corts; Referee: Vilalta

Campionat de Catalunya

24 September 1939 Jornada 1	CD Granollers	1 - 2	FC Barcelona	Granollers
	Goal		Hilario; Pagès	Referee: Armengoal

1 October 1939 Jornada 2	FC Barcelona	2 - 3	Girona FC	Barcelona
	César; Herrerita		Bremon; Lluch	Stadium: Camp de les Corts; Referee: Arribas Seijas

8 October 1939 Jornada 3	Badalona FC	1 - 2	FC Barcelona	Badalona
	Xiol		Pascual; Herrerita	Referee: Mallorquí

12 October 1939 Jornada 4	RCD Español	3 - 0	FC Barcelona	Barcelona
	Rovira; Jorge; Martínez Català			Stadium: Estadi de Sarrià; Referee: Cruella

15 October 1939 Jornada 5	FC Barcelona	4 - 0	CD Sabadell FC	Barcelona
	Hilario; Pascual; Rigual			Stadium: Camp de les Corts; Referee: Arribas Seijas

22 October 1939 Jornada 6	FC Barcelona	3 - 2	CD Granollers	Barcelona
	Rigual; Pagès		Galany; Aylagas	Stadium: Camp de les Corts; Referee: Santillano

29 October 1939 Jornada 7	Girona FC	1 - 0	FC Barcelona	Girona
	Bremon 40'			Stadium: Camp de Vista Alegre; Referee: Arribas Seijas

5 November 1939 Jornada 8	FC Barcelona	11 - 0	Badalona FC	Barcelona
	León; Herrerita; Emilín; Bardina; Fuentes			Stadium: Camp de les Corts; Referee: Cruella

12 November 1939 Jornada 9	FC Barcelona	3 - 5	RCD Español	Barcelona
	León; Herrerita		Martínez Català; Gonzalvo; Lloret	Stadium: Camp de les Corts; Referee: Vilalta

19 November 1939 Jornada 10	CD Sabadell FC	4 - 2	FC Barcelona	Sabadell
	Font; Grech; Martínez		Herrerita; Emilín	Stadium: Camp de la Creu Alta; Referee: Mallorquí

Campionat de Lliga

3 December 1939 Jornada 1	FC Barcelona	0 - 1	RCD Español	Barcelona
			Martínez Català 40'	Stadium: Camp de les Corts; Referee: Vilalta Bars

10 December 1939 Jornada 2	Real Club Celta de Vigo	1 - 2	FC Barcelona	Vigo
	Venancio 62'		Sospedra 37'; Fuentes 66'	Stadium: Estadi de Balaídos; Referee: Pedro Escartín (Madrid)

3 December 1939 Jornada 3	FC Barcelona	4 - 1	Valencia FC	Barcelona
	Hilario 22'; Fuentes 41'; Iturraspe (pp) 58'; Emilín 73'		Iturraspe 81'	Stadium: Camp de les Corts; Referee: Ostale Gómez (Aragó)

24 December 1939 Jornada 4	Athletic Aviación Club	3 - 0	FC Barcelona	Chamartín de la Rosa
	Enrique 3' 64'; Arencibia 73'			Stadium: Estadio Chamartín; Referee: Rodríguez

31 December 1939 Jornada 5	FC Barcelona	2 - 0	Real Betis Balompié	Barcelona
	Olivé 20'; Herrerita 67'			Stadium: Camp de les Corts; Referee: Ramón Melcón

7 January 1940 Jornada 6	Zaragoza FC	3 - 1	FC Barcelona	Zaragoza
	Antón 43'; Deva 66'; Doro 70'		Emilín	Stadium: Estadio de Torrero; Referee: Steimborn

14 January 1940 Jornada 7	Athletic Club	7 - 5	FC Barcelona	Bilbao
	Gárate 7' 9' 67'; Panizo 7'; Gorostiza 48'; Elices 59'; Unamuno 73'		Rocasolano II 16'; Pascual 51' 76' 84'; Rosalench 80'	Stadium: Estadi de San Mamés; Referee: Crespo

21 January 1940 Jornada 8	FC Barcelona	0 - 0	Hércules CF	Barcelona
				Stadium: Camp de les Corts; Referee: Pedro Escartín

28 January 1940 Jornada 9	Real Madrid FC	2 - 1	FC Barcelona	Chamartín de la Rosa
	Alonso 1'; Lecue 75'		Pascual 3'	Stadium: Estadi de Chamartín; Referee: Orduña

4 February 1940 Jornada 10	FC Barcelona	1 - 2	Sevilla FC	Barcelona
	Miranda 27'		Pepillo 8'; Campanal 68'	Stadium: Camp de les Corts; Referee: Gojenuri

11 February 1940 Jornada 11	Real Racing Club de Santander	2 - 3	FC Barcelona	Santander
	Saras 7'; Chas 20'		Emilín 11'; Pachi 38'; Herrerita 73'	Stadium: Campos de Sport del Sardinero; Referee: Crespo

18 February 1940 Jornada 12	RCD Español	1 - 1	FC Barcelona	Barcelona
	Prat 37'		Emilín 66'	Stadium: Estadi de Sarrià; Referee: Vilalta Bars

25 February 1940 Jornada 13	FC Barcelona	2 - 0	Real Club Celta de Vigo	Barcelona
	Emilín 13'; Herrerita 78'			Stadium: Camp de les Corts; Referee: Orduña

3 March 1940 Jornada 14	Valencia FC	3 - 1	FC Barcelona	Valencia
	Botana 30'; Poli 42'; Mundo 75'		Homedes 47'	Stadium: Estadi de Mestalla; Referee: Ramón Melcón

10 March 1940 Jornada 15	FC Barcelona	1 - 2	Athletic Aviación Club	Barcelona
	Sospedra 51'		Elícegui 7'; Gabilondo 75'	Stadium: Camp de les Corts; Referee: Jauregui

17 March 1940 Jornada 16	Real Betis Balompié	3 - 0	FC Barcelona	Sevilla
	Saro 6'; Paquirri 62'; Fernández 86'			Stadium: Heliópolis; Referee: Ramón Melcón

24 March 1940 Jornada 17	FC Barcelona	2 - 1	Zaragoza FC	Barcelona
	Herrerita 26' 89'		Primo 13'	Stadium: Camp de les Corts; Referee: Tamarit Falguera

31 March 1940 Jornada 18	FC Barcelona	0 - 2	Athletic Club	Barcelona
			Elices 10' 23'	Stadium: Camp de les Corts; Referee: Arribas Seijas

7 April 1940 Jornada 19	Hércules CF	1 - 2	FC Barcelona	Alicante
	Aparício 60'		Calvet 37' 46'	Stadium: Estadio Bardín; Referee: Pedro Escartín

14 April 1940 Jornada 20	FC Barcelona	0 - 0	Real Madrid FC	Barcelona
				Stadium: Camp de les Corts; Referee: Ostale Gómez (Aragó)

21 April 1940 Jornada 21	Sevilla FC	2 - 1	FC Barcelona	Sevilla
	Campanal 20'; Torrontegui 42'		Herrerita 28'	Stadium: Estadio de Nervión; Referee: Tamarit Falguera

28 April 1940 Jornada 22	FC Barcelona	3 - 1	Racing de Santander	Barcelona
	Herrerita 63' 70'; Sospedra 83'		Cuca 10'	Stadium: Camp de les Corts; Referee: Ramón Melcón

Copa del Generalíssim

12 May 1940 Primera ronda - anada	Athletic FC de Palma	2 - 2	FC Barcelona	Palma
	Maimó 15'		Ailagas 35'	Referee: Ferragut (València)

19 May 1940 Primera ronda - tornada	FC Barcelona	7 - 0	Athletic FC de Palma	Barcelona
	Ailagas; Sospedra; Gracia; Martín; Galvany			Stadium: Camp de les Corts

24 May 1940 Vuitens de final - anada	FC Barcelona	4 - 0	RC Deportivo de la Coruña	Barcelona
	Emilín; Gracia; Quintas (pp)			Stadium: Camp de les Corts

26 May 1940 Vuitens de final - tornada	RC Deportivo de la Coruña	0 - 1	FC Barcelona	La Coruña
			Martín	Stadium: Estadi de Riazor

2 June 1940 Quarter-finals	FC Barcelona	0 - 2	RCD Español	Barcelona
			Gonzalvo 18' 86'	Stadium: Camp de les Corts

9 June 1940 Quarter-finals	RCD Español	1 - 1	FC Barcelona	Barcelona
	Martínez Català 49'		Gracia 54'	Stadium: Estadi de Sarrià
