= Gonzalvo =

Gonzalvo is a surname. Notable people with the name include:

- Jordi Gonzalvo (born 1947), Spanish footballer
- José Gonzalvo (1920–1978), Catalan footballer and manager from Spain
- Josep Maria Gonzalvo (born 1959), Spanish football manager
- Juli Gonzalvo (1917–2003), Spanish footballer
- Luis Gonzalvo (born 1990), drummer in DVICIO, a Spanish Latin pop group
- Mariano Gonzalvo (1922–2007), Spanish footballer
- Pablo Gonzalvo (1827–1896), Spanish painter

== See also ==
- Gonzalo (name), a Spanish masculine given name of Germanic origin
