= List of FC Barcelona players =

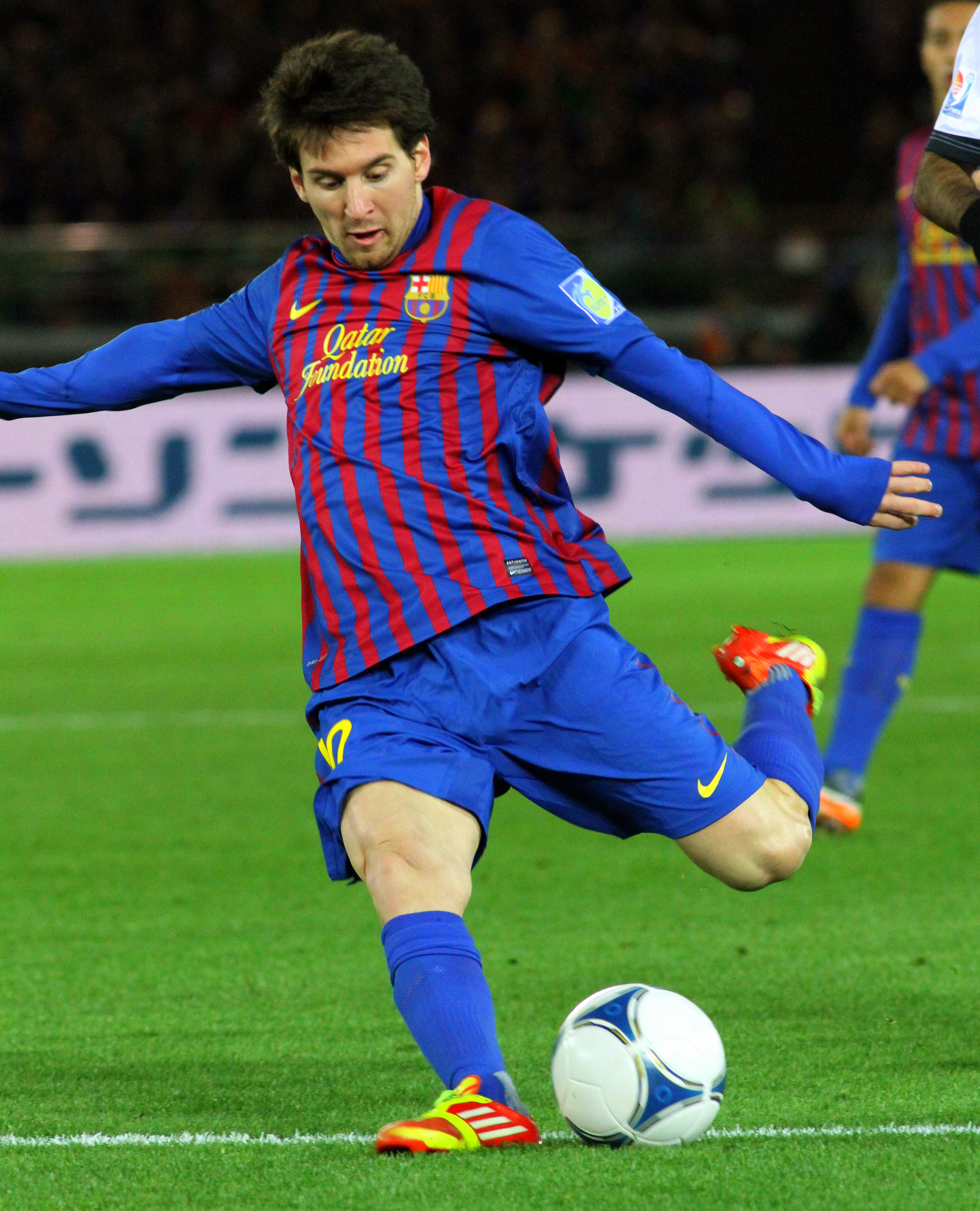
Lionel Messi holds the record for the most goals and appearances at Barcelona

Futbol Club Barcelona is a professional association football club based in Barcelona, Catalonia, Spain. The club was founded in 1899 by a group of Swiss, English and Spanish men led by Joan Gamper. Barcelona is one of only three clubs to have never been relegated from La Liga and the most successful club in Spanish football, having won a total of 79 domestic titles: 27 La Liga titles, a record 32 Spanish Cups, a record two League Cups, a record 15 Spanish Super Cups and a record three Copas Eva Duarte. Barcelona is the only European side to have played continental football in every season since its inception in 1955 and one of the most successful clubs in European football, having won 22 official UEFA and FIFA trophies in total.

Aside from being the founder, Gamper was also one of the club's first footballers and holds the record for most goals in a single match, with nine. Lionel Messi holds the record for the most number of appearances in official matches with 778, is the all-time top scorer with 700+ goals, all-time top scorer in official competitions, with 672, is the current La Liga top scorer with 474 goals and holds the record for the most appearances in La Liga, with 520 matches. Messi also won the record number of trophies with the club (35).

Barcelona has employed several famous players, with five FIFA World Player of the Year winners and six Ballon d'Or winners among the previous and current Barcelona players. This makes Barça the club with the most FIFA World Player awards received by the players. In 2009, Barcelona achieved an unprecedented sextuple by winning La Liga, the Copa del Rey, the UEFA Champions League, the Supercopa de España, the UEFA Super Cup and the FIFA Club World Cup in one calendar year. The same year, five of their players and their coach were voted onto the UEFA Team of the Year.

The list includes notable footballers who have played for Barcelona. Generally, this means players that have played at least 100 league matches for the club. However, some players who have played fewer matches are also included if they are on Barcelona's list of legends. Between 1899 and May 2015, 958 footballers have played at least one official game with Barcelona.

== Key ==
*	Club record holder
‡	Played their entire career at Barcelona
Name in italics	Currently playing for Barcelona
Year in italics	Started/ended career before inauguration of La Liga
**Bold**	Record league goals or appearances

== List of players ==
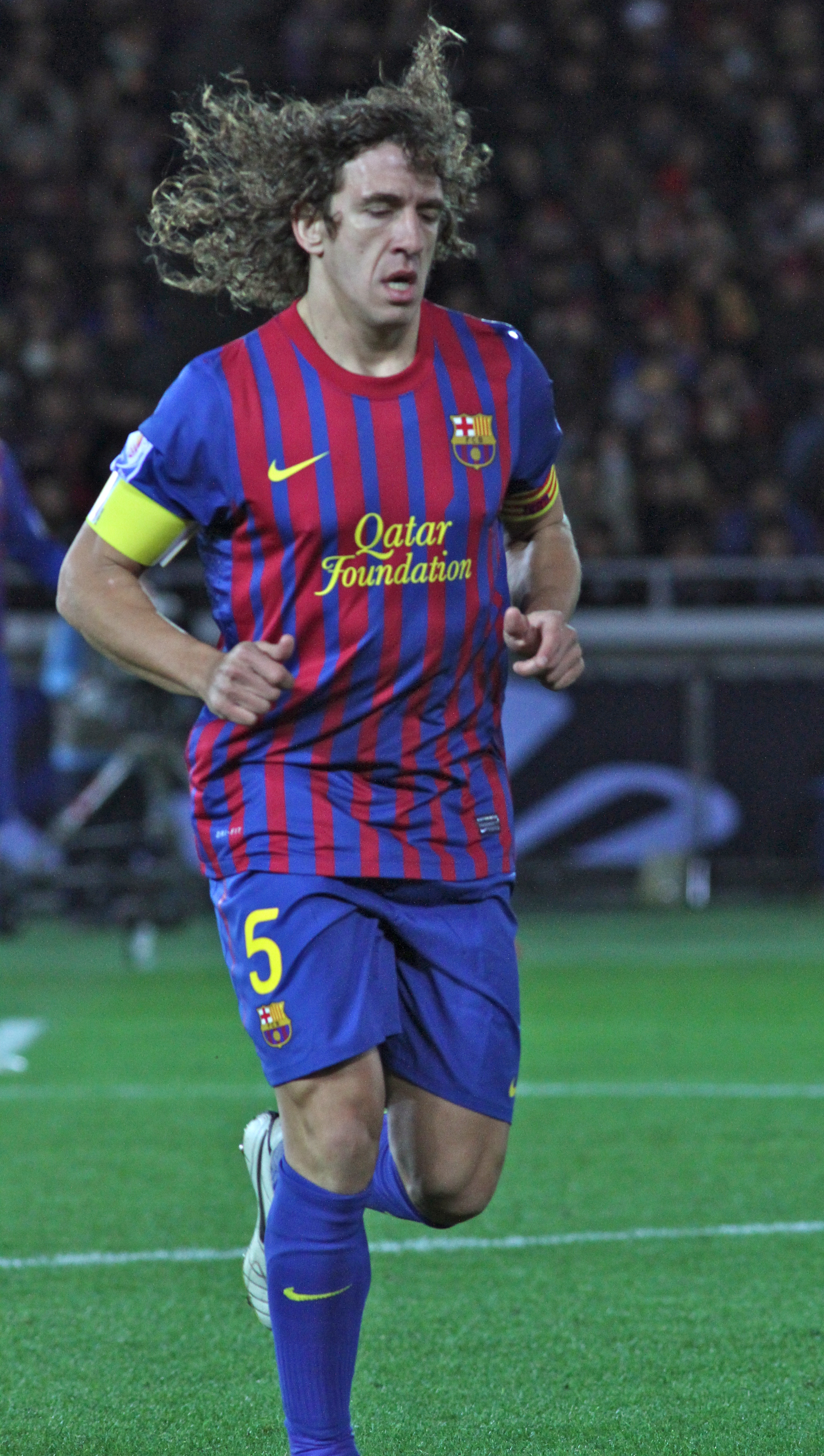
Carles Puyol captained Barcelona to the first Spanish treble.

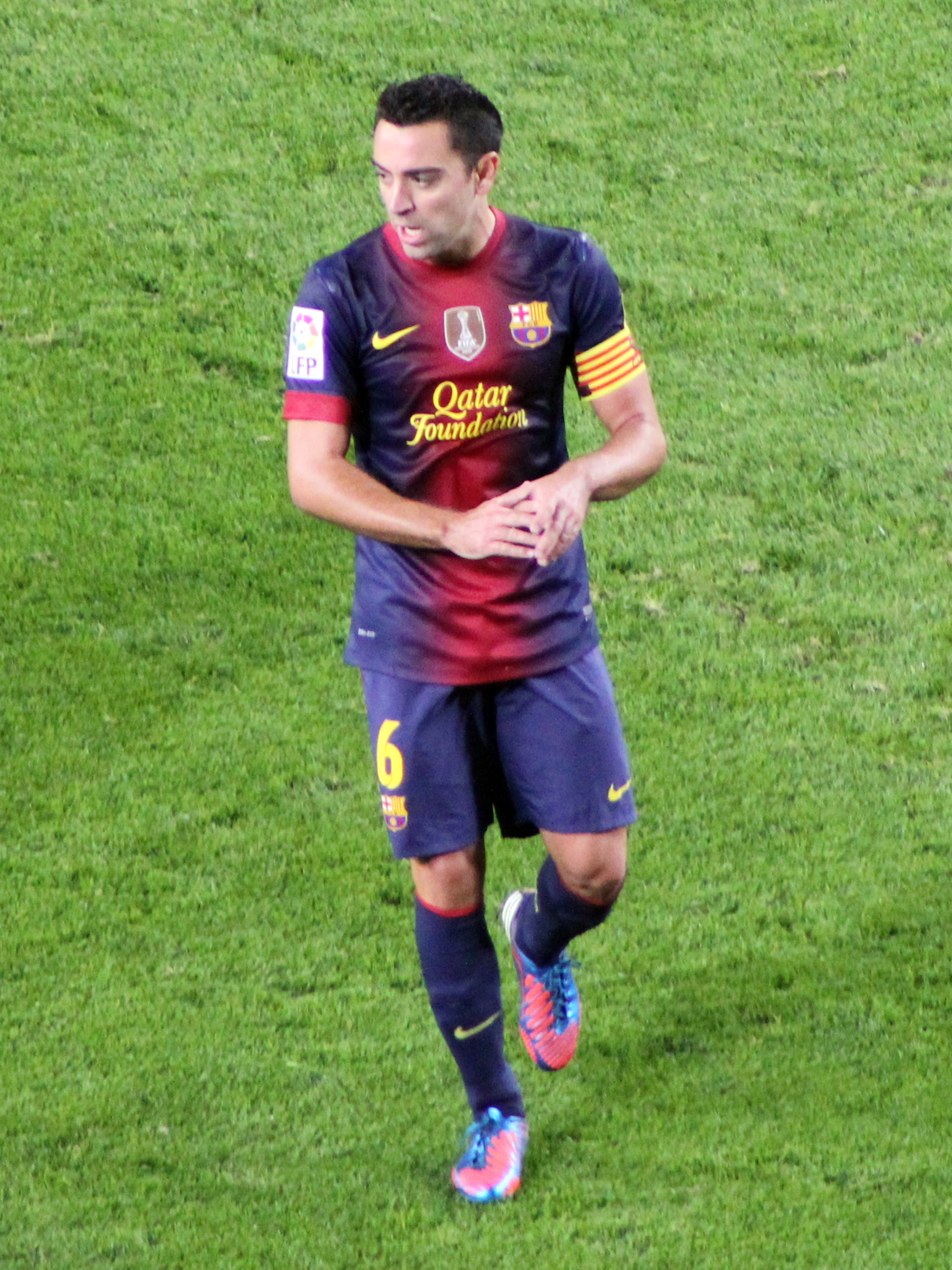
Xavi has made the most international competition appearances with 178 matches for Barcelona.

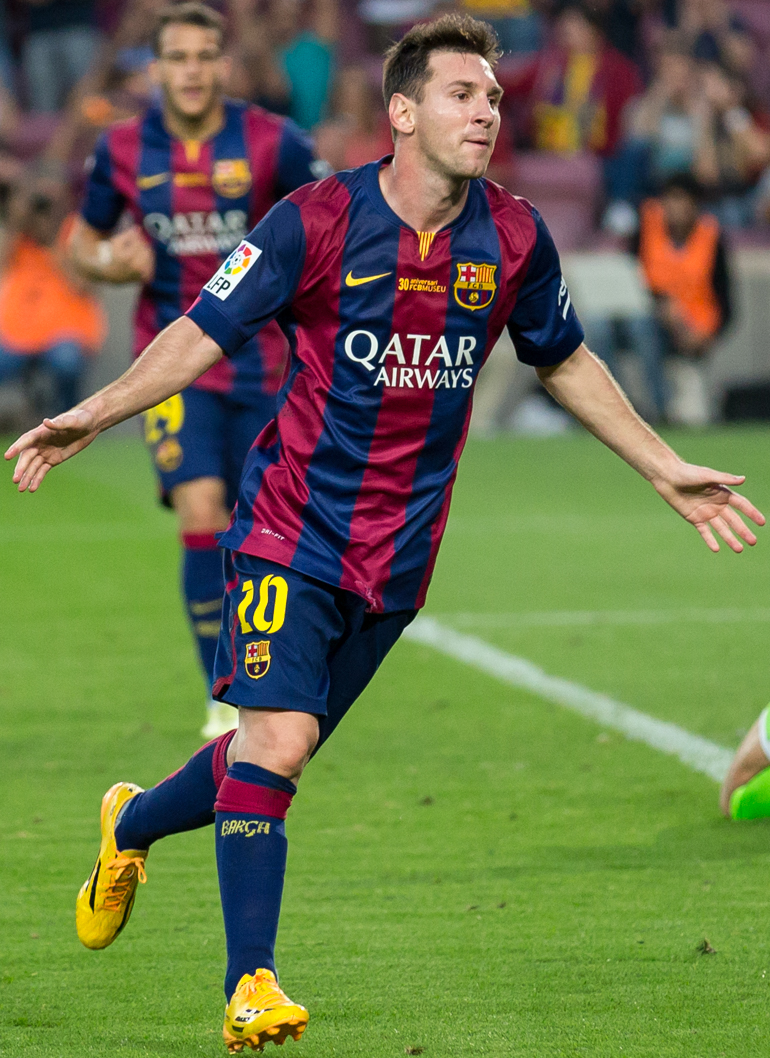
Lionel Messi is the only player to win Ballon d'Or, FIFA World Player of the Year, Pichichi Trophy and European Golden Shoe in the same season. He is also the all-time highest scorer for Barcelona.

- Appearance and goal totals only include matches in La Liga, which was first established in 1928; players who were only active before then are included for their notability. Substitute appearances are included.
- Statistics are correct as of 21 December 2025.

Name	Nationality	Position^{[NB]}	Barcelona career	Captaincy	League appearances	League goals	Notes	Refs
Joan Gamper *	Switzerland	Forward	1899–1903	—	—	—	^{[A]}	
Carles Comamala	Spain	Forward	1903–1912	—	—	—		
Paulino Alcántara	Philippines; Spain	Forward	1912–1916; 1918–1927	1920–1927	—	—		
Ramón Torralba	Spain	Midfielder	1913–1928	—	—	—		
Josep Samitier *	Spain	Midfielder	1919–1932	1927–1932	28	20	^{[B]}	
Vicenc Piera	Spain	Midfielder	1920–1933 ‡	—	53	6		
Ferenc Plattkó	Hungary	Goalkeeper	1923–1930	—	17	0		
Juan José Nogués	Spain	Goalkeeper	1930–1942	1933–1942	114	0		
Alejandro Morera Soto	Costa Rica	Forward	1933–1935	—	24	11		
Martí Ventolrà	Spain	Winger	1933–1937	—	58	31		
Josep Raich	Spain	Midfielder	1934–1936; 1940–1945	—	140	16		
Josep Escolà	Spain	Forward	1934–1949	—	152	86		
Mariano Martín	Spain	Forward	1939–1948	—	112	97	^{[Pichichi*]}	
Francisco Calvet	Spain	Defender	1939–1952	—	151	7		
José Bravo	Spain	Forward	1940–1948	—	120	51		
César Rodrìguez	Spain	Forward	1942–1955	1946–1955	287	192	^{[Pichichi]}	
José Puig Puig	Spain	Defender	1942–1951	—	178	1		
Marià Gonzalvo	Spain	Midfielder	1942–1956	1955–1956	208	26		
Jaume Elías	Spain	Defender	1943–1949	—	123	0		
Juan Velasco	Spain	Goalkeeper	1943–1954	—	168	0	^{[Zamora]}	
Josep Seguer	Spain	Winger	1943–1957	—	214	38		
Josep Gonzalvo	Spain	Midfielder	1943–1950	—	146	3		
Estanislao Basora	Spain	Winger	1946–1958	—	237	89		
Antoni Ramallets *	Spain	Goalkeeper	1946–1961	1956–1961	288	0	^{[C]}^{[Zamora]}	
Joan Segarra	Spain	Defender	1949–1964 ‡	1961–1964	299	17		
László Kubala	Czechoslovakia; Hungary; Spain	Forward	1950–1961	—	186	131		
Eduardo Manchón	Spain	Winger	1950–1957	—	144	57		
Gustau Biosca	Spain	Defender	1950–1958	—	139	3		
Sígfrid Gràcia	Spain	Defender	1952–1966	—	231	5		
Justo Tejada	Spain	Forward	1953–1961	—	149	73		
Luis Suárez *	Spain	Winger	1954–1961	—	122	61	^{[D]}^{[d'Or]}	
Ramón Villaverde	Spain	Forward	1954–1963	—	162	53		
Eulogio Martínez	Paraguay; Spain	Forward	1956–1962	—	111	62		
Enric Gensana	Spain	Defender	1956–1964	—	132	13		
Martí Vergés	Spain	Midfielder	1956–1966	—	188	15		
Ferran Olivella	Spain	Defender	1956–1969	1964–1969	215	1		
Evaristo de Macedo	Brazil	Forward	1957–1962	—	114	78		
Sándor Kocsis	Hungary	Forward	1958–1965	—	75	42		
Zoltán Czibor	Hungary	Forward	1958–1961	—	84	36		
José Manuel Pesudo	Spain	Goalkeeper	1961–1966	—	65	0	^{[Zamora]}	
Pedro Zaballa	Spain	Midfielder	1961–1967	—	109	28		
Julio César Benítez	Uruguay	Defender	1961–1968	—	123	10		
Chus Pereda	Spain	Midfielder	1961–1969	—	134	41		
Salvador Sadurní	Spain	Goalkeeper	1961–1976	1969–1971	247	0	^{[Zamora]}	
José Antonio Zaldúa	Spain	Forward	1961–1971	—	145	61		
Cayetano Ré	Paraguay	Forward	1962–1966	—	84	56	^{[Pichichi]}	
Josep Maria Fusté	Spain	Midfielder	1962–1972	—	197	47		
Eladio Silvestre	Spain	Defender	1962–1972	—	226	8		
Joaquim Rifé	Spain	Defender	1964–1976	1971–1973	290	23		
Antoni Torres	Spain	Defender	1965–1976	—	269	2		
Gallego	Spain	Defender	1965–1975	—	248	17		
Carles Rexach	Spain	Forward	1965–1981	—	328	81	^{[Pichichi]}	
Miguel Reina	Spain	Goalkeeper	1966–1973	—	111	0	^{[Zamora]}	
Pedro María Zabalza	Spain	Midfielder	1967–1973	—	149	10		
Juan Carlos Pérez	Spain	Midfielder	1968–1975	—	163	18		
Marcial Pina	Spain	Midfielder	1969–1977	—	210	47		
Juan Manuel Asensi	Spain	Forward	1970–1980	1978–1980	299	73		
Quique Costas	Spain	Defender	1971–1980	—	172	3		
Antonio de la Cruz	Spain	Defender	1972–1979	—	183	6		
Hugo Sotil	Peru	Forward	1973–1977	—	65	21		
Johan Cruyff	Netherlands	Forward	1973–1978	1974–1978	139	47	^{[d'Or]}	
Migueli	Spain	Defender	1973–1989	—	391	20		
Johan Neeskens	Netherlands	Midfielder	1974–1979	—	140	35		
Pedro María Artola	Spain	Goalkeeper	1975–1984	—	186	0	^{[Zamora]}	
José Vicente Sánchez	Spain	Midfielder	1975–1986	1983–1984	236	13		
José Antonio Ramos Huete	Spain	Defender	1976–1982	—	119	0		
Antonio Olmo	Spain	Defender	1976–1984	1980–1982	188	4		
Esteban Vigo	Spain	Midfielder	1977–1987	—	166	18		
Francisco José Carrasco	Spain	Forward	1978–1989	—	262	49		
Hans Krankl	Austria	Forward	1978–1980	—	46	34	^{[Pichichi]}	
Allan Simonsen	Denmark	Forward	1979–1982	—	98	31		
José Ramón Alexanko	Spain	Defender	1980–1993	1986–1993	274	26		
Quini	Spain	Forward	1980–1984	1982–1983	100	54	^{[Pichichi]}	
Bernd Schuster	Germany	Midfielder	1980–1988	1984–1986	170	63		
Josep Moratalla	Spain	Midfielder	1981–1988	—	104	1		
Javier Urruticoechea	Spain	Goalkeeper	1981–1988	—	120	0	^{[Zamora]}	
Gerardo Miranda	Spain	Defender	1981–1988	—	145	5		
Víctor Muñoz	Spain	Midfielder	1981–1988	1986–1988	224	14		
Diego Maradona	Argentina	Midfielder	1982–1984	—	36	22		
Marcos Alonso Peña	Spain	Winger	1982–1987	—	124	28		
Julio Alberto	Spain	Defender	1982–1991	—	200	9		
Urbano Ortega	Spain	Midfielder	1981–1991	—	122	7		
Ramón Calderé	Spain	Forward	1984–1988	—	110	15		
Gary Lineker	England	Forward	1986–1989	—	103	42		
Roberto Fernández	Spain	Midfielder	1986–1990	—	144	35		
Andoni Zubizarreta	Spain	Goalkeeper	1986–1994	—	301	0	^{[Zamora]}	
Guillermo Amor	Spain	Midfielder	1988–1998	—	311	47		
Txiki Begiristain	Spain	Midfielder	1988–1995	—	223	63		
Ricardo Serna	Spain	Defender	1988–1992	—	101	2		
Andoni Goikoetxea	Spain	Midfielder	1988–1994	—	126	6		
Julio Salinas	Spain	Forward	1988–1994	—	146	60		
Eusebio Sacristán	Spain	Midfielder	1988–1995	—	203	14		
José Mari Bakero	Spain	Midfielder	1988–1996	1993–1996	260	72		
Michael Laudrup	Denmark	Midfielder	1989–1994	—	167	40		
Ronald Koeman	Netherlands	Defender	1989–1995	—	192	67		
Albert Ferrer	Spain	Defender	1990–1998	—	204	1		
Hristo Stoichkov	Bulgaria	Forward	1990–1995; 1996–1998	—	175	83	^{[d'Or]}	
Pep Guardiola	Spain	Midfielder	1990–2001	1997–2001	263	6		
Miguel Ángel Nadal	Spain	Defender	1991–1999	—	207	12		
Sergi	Spain	Defender	1993–2002	2001–2002	267	6		
Romário *	Brazil	Forward	1993–1995	—	46	34	^{[E]}^{[FIFA]}^{[Pichichi]}	
Abelardo	Spain	Defender	1994–2002	—	178	11		
Luís Figo	Portugal	Midfielder	1995–2000	—	172	30		
Ronaldo	Brazil	Forward	1996–1997	—	37	34	^{[FIFA]}^{[Pichichi]}	
Luis Enrique	Spain	Midfielder	1996–2004	2002–2004	207	73		
Michael Reiziger	Netherlands	Defender	1997–2004	—	173	0		
Ruud Hesp	Netherlands	Goalkeeper	1997–2000	—	100	0		
Rivaldo	Brazil	Midfielder	1997–2002	—	157	86	^{[FIFA]}^{[d'Or]}	
Frank de Boer	Netherlands	Defender	1998–2003	—	144	5		
Phillip Cocu	Netherlands	Midfielder	1998–2004	—	205	31		
Patrick Kluivert	Netherlands	Forward	1998–2004	—	182	90		
Xavi *	Spain	Midfielder	1998–2015	2014–2015	505	58	^{[F]}	
Gabri	Spain	Midfielder	1999–2006	—	129	7		
Carles Puyol *	Spain	Defender	1999–2014 ‡	2004–2014	392	12	^{[H]}	
Thiago Motta	Brazil	Midfielder	2001–2007	—	96	6		
Javier Saviola	Argentina	Forward	2001–2007	—	123	49		
Oleguer	Spain	Defender	2001–2008	—	127	1		
Víctor Valdés*	Spain	Goalkeeper	2002–2014	—	387	0	^{[C]}^{[Zamora]}	
Andrés Iniesta*	Spain	Midfielder	2002–2018	2015–2018	442	35		
Ronaldinho	Brazil	Forward	2003–2008	—	145	70	^{[FIFA]}^{[d'Or]}	
Giovanni van Bronckhorst	Netherlands	Defender	2003–2007	—	105	5		
Rafael Márquez	Mexico	Defender	2003–2010	—	163	9		
Deco	Portugal	Midfielder	2004–2008	—	113	13		
Samuel Eto'o	Cameroon	Forward	2004–2009	—	144	108	^{[Pichichi]}	
Lionel Messi *	Argentina	Forward	2004–2021	2018–2021	**520**	**474**	^{[G]}^{[I]}^{[J]}^{[K]}^{[L]}^{[M]}^{[N]}^{[O]}^{[P]}^{[FIFA]}^{[d'Or]}^{[BEST]}^{[Pichichi]}	
Sylvinho	Brazil	Defender	2004–2009	—	89	2		
Eiður Guðjohnsen	Iceland	Forward	2006–2009	—	72	10		
Thierry Henry	France	Forward	2007–2010	—	80	35		
Bojan Krkić	Spain	Forward	2007–2011	—	104	26		
Yaya Touré	Ivory Coast	Midfielder	2007–2010	—	74	4		
Eric Abidal	France	Defender	2007–2013	—	125	0		
Dani Alves	Brazil	Defender	2008–2016; 2022	—	261	15		
Seydou Keita	Mali	Midfielder	2008–2012	—	119	16		
Sergio Busquets	Spain	Midfielder	2008–2023	2021–2023	481	11		
Gerard Piqué	Spain	Defender	2008–2022	—	397	29		
Pedro *	Spain	Midfielder	2008–2015	—	204	58	^{[P]}^{[Q]}	
Zlatan Ibrahimović	Sweden	Forward	2009-2011	—	26	19		
Thiago Alcântara	Spain	Midfielder	2009–2013	—	68	7		
Adriano	Brazil	Defender	2010–2016	—	114	9		
David Villa	Spain	Forward	2010–2013	—	77	33		
Javier Mascherano	Argentina	Defender	2010–2018	—	203	1		
Sergi Roberto	Spain	Defender	2010–2024	2023–2024	245	12		
Cesc Fàbregas	Spain	Midfielder	2011–2014	—	96	28		
Alexis Sánchez	Chile	Forward	2011–2014	—	88	39		
Jordi Alba	Spain	Defender	2012–2023	—	313	17		
Neymar	Brazil	Forward	2013–2017	—	123	68		
Luis Suárez *	Uruguay	Forward	2014–2020	—	191	147	^{[Pichichi]}	
Ivan Rakitić	Croatia	Midfielder	2014–2020	—	200	25		
Marc-André ter Stegen	Germany	Goalkeeper	2014–	2024–	291	0		
Samuel Umtiti	France	Defender	2016–2022	—	91	2		
Ousmane Dembélé	France	Forward	2017–2023	—	127	24		
Nélson Semedo	Portugal	Defender	2017–2020	—	82	2		
Philippe Coutinho	Brazil	Forward	2018–2021	—	76	17		
Clément Lenglet	France	Defender	2018–2025	—	105	4		
Ronald Araujo	Uruguay	Defender	2019–	—	130	10		
Frenkie de Jong	Netherlands	Midfielder	2019–	—	190	14		
Ansu Fati	Spain	Forward	2019–2026	—	86	22		
Antoine Griezmann	France	Forward	2019–2021	—	74	22		
Sergiño Dest	United States	Defender	2020–2024	—	52	2		
Pedri	Spain	Midfielder	2020-	—	150	22		
Alejandro Balde	Spain	Defender	2021–	—	102	1		
Gavi	Spain	Midfielder	2021–	—	110	6		
Eric García	Spain	Defender	2021–	—	99	4		
Jules Koundé	France	Defender	2022–	—	113	5		
Andreas Christensen	Denmark	Defender	2022–	—	70	2		
Robert Lewandowski*	Poland	Forward	2022–2026	—	124	80	^{[Pichichi]}	
Raphinha	Brazil	Forward	2022–	—	111	38		
Ferran Torres	Spain	Forward	2022–	—	124	36		
Marc Casadó	Spain	Midfielder	2022–	—	49	1		
Lamine Yamal	Spain	Forward	2023–	—	87	21		
Iñigo Martínez	Spain	Defender	2023–2025	—	48	1		
Fermín López	Spain	Midfielder	2023–	—	71	18		
João Cancelo	Portugal	Defender	2023–2024; 2025-	—	71	4		
Pau Cubarsí	Spain	Defender	2024–	—	48	1		
Gerard Martín	Spain	Defender	2024–	—	59	1		
Dani Olmo	Spain	Midfielder	2024–	—	58	17		
Wojciech Szczęsny	Poland	Goalkeeper	2024–	—	23	0		
Joan Garcia	Spain	Goalkeeper	2025–	—	30	0		
Roony Bardghji	Sweden	Forward	2025–	—	21	1		
Marcus Rashford	England	Forward	2025–2026	—	32	8		
Anthony Gordon,	England	Forward	2026–	—	0	0		
Karim Adeyemi	Germany	Forward						
Rodrigo Hernández	Spain	Midfielder						
Gabriel Jesús	Brazil	Forward						

== Club captains ==
Dates	Name	Notes
1947–1951	(Spain) César	
1951–1953	(Spain) Mariano Gonzalvo	
1953–1954	(Spain) César	
1954–1955	(Spain) Antoni Ramallets	
1955–1964	(Spain) Joan Segarra	
1964–1967	(Spain) Ferran Olivella	
1967–1969	(Spain) Jose Antonio Zaldua	
1969–1970	(Spain) Eladio Silvestre	
1970–1973	(Spain) Joaquim Rifé	
1973–1974	(Spain) Juan Carlos Perez	
1974–1975	(Spain) Antoni Torres	
1975–1978	(Netherlands) Johan Cruyff	First foreign captain in Barcelona history
1978–1980	(Spain) Juan Manuel Asensi	First captain to win Cup Winners Cup
1980–1982	(Spain) Antonio Olmo	
1982–1984	(Spain) Tente Sánchez	
1984–1986	(Germany) Bernd Schuster	
1986–1987	(Spain) Víctor Muñoz	
1987–1992	(Spain) José Ramón Alexanko	First captain to win European Cup
1992–1993	(Spain) Andoni Zubizarreta	First captain to be a Goalkeeper
1993–1996	(Spain) José Mari Bakero	
1996–1997	(Romania) Gheorghe Popescu	First captain from Eastern Europe
1997–2001	(Spain) Pep Guardiola	
2001–2002	(Spain) Sergi Barjuán	
2002–2004	(Spain) Luis Enrique	
2004–2014	(Spain) Carles Puyol	Longest-serving and most successful captain in Barcelona history
2014–2015	(Spain) Xavi	
2015–2018	(Spain) Andrés Iniesta	
2018–2021	(Argentina) Lionel Messi	First non-European captain in Barcelona history
2021–2023	(Spain) Sergio Busquets	
2023–2024	(Spain) Sergi Roberto	
2024–2025	(Germany) Marc-André ter Stegen	
2025–2026	(Uruguay) Ronald Araújo	
2026–	(Brazil) Raphinha	

== Notes ==
NB For a full description of positions see football positions.

- d'Or. **^{a}** **^{b}** **^{c}** **^{d}** **^{e}** **^{f}** Won Ballon d'Or while at Barcelona.
- BEST. **^{a}** Won The Best FIFA Men's Player while at Barcelona.
- FIFA. **^{a}** **^{b}** **^{c}** **^{d}** **^{e}** Won FIFA Player of the Year while at Barcelona.
- Pichichi.**^{a}** **^{b}** **^{c}** **^{d}** **^{e}** **^{f}** **^{g}** **^{h}** **^{i}** **^{j}** Won the Pichichi Trophy, a trophy for top goalscorer in the league, while at Barcelona. Martín was the first Barcelona player to win the trophy.
- Zamora.**^{a}** **^{b}** **^{c}** **^{d}** **^{e}** **^{f}** **^{g}** **^{h}** **^{i}** Won the Zamora Trophy, a trophy for goalkeeper who has the lowest "goals-to-games" ratio in the league, while at Barcelona.
- A. Gamper is record goalscorer in one match, with nine goals.
- B. Samitier is Barcelona's record goalscorer in the Spanish Cup.
- C. Ramallets along with Valdés has Barcelona's record of Zamora trophies, with five trophies won.
- D. Suárez was the first Barcelona player to win the Ballon d'Or in 1960.
- E. Romário was the first Barcelona player to win the FIFA World Player of the Year award, in 1994.
- F. Xavi has made the most appearances for Barcelona with 178 matches in international competitions games.
- G. Messi has won the most titles with Barcelona, with 35; 10 La Liga, 7 Copas del Rey, 4 Champions League, 8 Supercopas de España, 3 UEFA Super Cups and 3 FIFA Club World Cups
- H. Puyol captained Barcelona to the first ever sextuple.
- I. Messi is Barcelona's record goalscorer in all competitions including friendlies with 709 goals.
- J. Messi is Barcelona's record goalscorer in official competitions with 672 goals.
- K. Messi is Barcelona's record goalscorer in La Liga with 474 goals.
- L. Messi is Barcelona's record goalscorer league goals in one season, with 50 goals in a 38-game league during the 2011–12 season.
- M. Messi is Barcelona's record goalscorer most goals in one season with 73 goals in official competitions during the 2011–12 season.
- N. Messi is Barcelona's record goalscorer most goals in international competitions for Barcelona with 128.
- O. Messi holds the record of appearances for Barcelona as a foreign player, with 520 La Liga appearances.
- P. Pedro and Messi are the only players to score in six official competitions in a year. They scored in the La Liga, Spanish Cup, Spanish Supercup, UEFA Champions League, UEFA Super Cup and FIFA Club World Cup in 2009 (Pedro) and 2011 (Messi).
- Q. Pedro scored the fastest league hat-trick in Barcelona's history: 9 minutes (34th, 41st, 43rd), against Getafe in 2013–14.
- R. Coutinho transferred from Liverpool to Barcelona in the winter of 2018, with Barcelona's joint highest transfer fee of €105 million.
- S. Griezmann transferred from Atlético Madrid to Barcelona in the summer of 2019, with Barcelona's joint highest transfer fee of €105 million.
- T. Lionel Messi has made the most league appearances for Barcelona with 520 games.
- U. Messi has made the most appearances for Barcelona with 778 games in all competitions.

== See also ==
- List of Catalan footballers
