= Garceran =

Garceran or Garcerán is a Spanish surname. Notable people with the surname include:

- Antoine Garceran (born 1950), French former professional footballer
- Francisco Garcerán (1913–2007), Spanish footballer
- Garcerán V de Pinós (–1277), Spanish baron and lord
- Julio Garceran de Vall (1907–1989), Supreme Court Justice of Cuba
- Pedro Luis Garcerán de Borja (1528–1592), Spanish nobleman
- Rafael Garcerán Sánchez (1906–1991), Spanish politician and lawyer of Falangist ideology
