= Antonio Chas =

Spanish footballer

Personal information
- Full name: Antonio Chas Veira
- Date of birth: 14 March 1915
- Place of birth: Oleiros, Galicia, Spain
- Date of death: 11 December 1980 (aged 65)
- Place of death: Galicia, Spain
- Position: Forward

Senior career*
Years	Team	Apps	(Gls)
1929–1930	Galicia Sport Club		
1930–1935	Deportivo de La Coruña		
1932–1933	→ Celta de Vigo (on loan)		
1933–1934	→ Club Lemos (on loan)		
1935–1936	Racing de Santander	22	(15)
1936–1937	Espanyol		
1938	Racing de Ferrol		
1939–1940	Racing de Santander	21	(14)
1940–1942	Espanyol	24	(15)
1942–1946	Real Oviedo	35	(19)
1946–1947	Caudal Deportivo		
1947–1948	Real Murcia		
Total		102	(63)

International career
1936–1941	Catalonia	2	(0)
- * Club domestic league appearances and goals

Antonio Chas Veira (14 March 1915 – 11 December 1980) was a Spanish footballer who played as a forward for Celta de Vigo, Racing de Santander, Espanyol, and Real Oviedo in the 1930s and 1940s. He also played two matches for the Catalan national team.

== Playing career ==
=== Early career ===
Born in Oleiros, Galicia, on 14 March 1915, Chas began his football career in his hometown club Galicia Sport Club in 1929, aged only 14, where his talent was immediately noticed by the scoutes of Deportivo de La Coruña, who quickly signed him in 1930. Tall and robust, he had the ideal physique for a center-forward at that time, becoming known as "the impetuous battering ram", and also as Chucho Chas. He also had a good head game and a strong shot with both legs. In 1932, Deportivo loaned the 17-year-old Chas to Celta, where he played a total of 10 matches, making his debut on 25 September 1932 in Balaídos, in a Galicia Regional Championship fixture against Eiriña (2–1), and playing his last on 16 April 1933, in a Copa del Rey away match against Real Zaragoza, scoring a goal in an eventual 3–2 loss on aggregate.

Deportivo then loaned him again, this time to Club Lemos (1933–34), and after another eventful season at Deportivo (1934–35), Chas went to Racing de Santander, where he was immediately considered one of the best strikers in the club's history, scoring 14 goals in 21 matches, but his stint there was interrupted by a serious injury at the end of the 1935–36 season, a broken collarbone, for which he underwent surgery in Barcelona. With the outbreak of the Spanish Civil War, Chas was unable to return to Santander, so he joined Espanyol for the 1936–37 season, scoring 19 goals in 30 matches, and helping his side win the Catalan championship in 1936–37. He then returned to A Coruña, where in addition to Deportivo, he also played some friendly matches with Racing de Ferrol.

=== Espanyol ===
When the War finally ended in 1939, Chas returned to Racing de Santander, which had lost two of its starters in the conflict, Milucho and Cisco, and the lack of players resulted in the team's relegation to the Segunda División in 1940. In total, he scored 29 goals in 43 matches for Racing, including his first La Liga hat-trick, against his former club Celta Vigo on 24 March 1940, to help his side to a 6–2 win. The relegation led Chas to return to Espanyol, with whom he played for a further two seasons, scoring 25 goals in 34 matches, including his second La Liga hat-trick against Real Sociedad on 29 March 1942, to help his side to a 8–0 win. Together with Macala, Gabriel Jorge, and Francisco Mas, he played a crucial role in helping Espanyol reach the final of the 1941 Copa del Generalísimo against Valencia CF, which ended in a 3–1 loss.

=== Later career ===
In 1944, Chas was signed by Real Oviedo, remaining there for four seasons, where he scored a further two La Liga hat-tricks, including against his future club Real Murcia (3–2) on 15 April 1945, which he went on to join in 1947, after passing through Caudal Deportivo on loan from Oviedo. His other hat-trick helped Oviedo to a historic 6–0 victory over FC Barcelona on 14 January 1945. He played his last football in Murcia, retiring in 1948, at the age of 33. In total, he scored 63 goals in 102 La Liga matches for Racing, Espanyol, and Oviedo between 1935 and 1946.

== International career ==
As an Espanyol player, Chas was eligible to play for the Catalan national team, with whom he played twice, the first on 6 September 1936 in a friendly against Barça at Les Corts, but he then had to wait five years until earning his second cap on 6 July 1941, in a friendly against a Stuttgart selection at the Adolf Hitler camp in Stuttgart, helping his side to a 1–0 win.

== Death ==
After retiring, Chas returned to his homeland of Galicia, where he raised his family, started a hospitality business, and also where he died on 11 December 1980, at the age of 65.

== Honours ==
RCD Espanyol

- Catalan championship:
  - Champions (1): 1936–37
- Copa del Rey:
  - Runner-up (1): 1941

== See also ==
- List of La Liga hat-tricks
