= 1940 Copa del Generalísimo final =

Copa del Generalísimo 1940 final
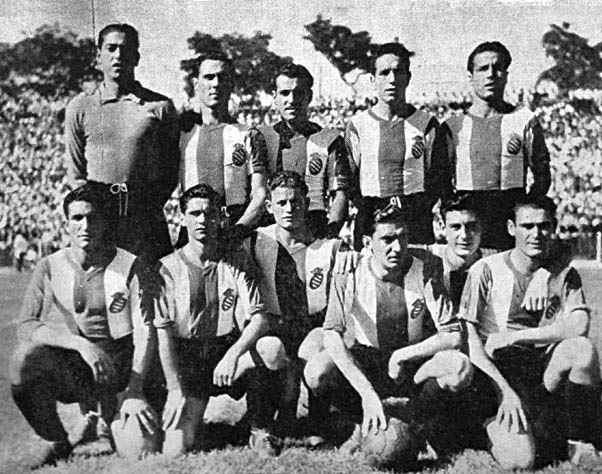
- Español, champions
- Event: 1940 Copa del Generalísimo
CD Español	Madrid FC
3	2
- (a.e.t.)
- Date: 30 June 1940
- Venue: Campo de Fútbol de Vallecas, Madrid
- Referee: Julio Ostalé
- Attendance: 20,000

The Copa del Generalísimo 1940 final was the 38th final of the King's Cup. The final was played at Campo de Fútbol de Vallecas in Madrid, on 30 June 1940, being won by CD Español, who beat Madrid CF 3-2 after extra time.

== Match details ==
30 June 1940
17:30 CET

Espanyol	3–2 (a.e.t.)	Madrid CF
Jorge 30', 86'; Mas 110'	Report	Alonso 5'; Alday 89'

Campo de Fútbol de Vallecas, Madrid
Attendance: 20,000
Referee: Julio Ostalé

Espanyol	Madrid CF

GK	1	(Spain) José Trías
DF	2	(Spain) Ricardo Teruel
DF	3	(Spain) Benito Pérez (c)
MF	4	(Spain) Jaime Arasa
MF	5	(Spain) Isidro Rovira
MF	6	(Spain) Félix Llimós
FW	7	(Spain) Felipe Ara
FW	8	(Spain) Gabriel Jorge
FW	9	(Spain) Vicent Martínez Catalá
FW	10	(Spain) Juli Gonzalvo
FW	11	(Spain) Francisco Mas
Manager:
(Spain) Patricio Caicedo

GK	1	(Spain) Enrique Esquiva
DF	2	(Spain) José Mardones
DF	3	(Spain) Jacinto Quincoces (c)
MF	4	(Spain) Villita
MF	5	(Spain) Antonio Bonet
MF	6	(Spain) Juan Antonio Ipiña
FW	7	(Spain) Luis Marín
FW	8	(Spain) Chus Alonso
FW	9	(Spain) Manuel Alday
FW	10	(Spain) Simón Lecue
FW	11	(Spain) Emilín
Manager:
(Spain) Francisco Bru
