= Grulla =

Grulla may refer to:

- Grulla Morioka, a Japanese football (soccer) club
- Grulla National Wildlife Refuge, wildlife refuge in New Mexico
- Grulla, Texas, small town in southern Texas
- Grullo, a color of horses in the dun family
- Grullos, one of eleven parishes in Candamo, Spain
