= Esquiva =

Esquiva may refer to:

- Esquiva, evasion capoeira technique
- Esquiva Falcão (born 1989), Brazilian professional boxer
- Enrique Esquiva (1916–2003), Spanish footballer
