= Ventosa =

Ventosa may refer to the following places:

- Ventosa, Asturias, Spain
- Ventosa, La Rioja, Spain
- Ventosa (Alenquer), Portugal
- Ventosa de la Cuesta, Castile and León, Spain
- Ventosa del Río Almar, Castile and León, Spain
