= 1998–99 FC Barcelona B season =

FC Barcelona B
1998–99 season
- President: Josep Lluís Núñez
- Head coach: Josep Maria Gonzalvo
- Stadium: Mini Estadi
- Segunda División: 20th (relegated)
- Top goalscorer: League: Luis García (10); All: Luis García (10)

The 1998–99 season was the 29th season in the history of FC Barcelona B and their first season back in the second division of Spanish football. The team participated in the Segunda División. The season covered the period from 1 July 1998 to 30 June 1999.

== Competitions ==
=== Overall record ===
Competition	First match	Last match	Starting round	Final position	Record							
Competition	First match	Last match	Starting round	Final position	Pld	W	D	L	GF	GA	GD	Win %
Segunda División	30 August 1998	20 June 1999	Matchday 1	20th	42	13	5	24	51	68	−17	30.95
Total					42	13	5	24	51	68	−17	30.95

Source: Competitions

==== League table ====
Pos	Team	Pld	W	D	L	GF	GA	GD	Pts	Promotion, qualification or relegation
18	Eibar	42	13	8	21	42	56	−14	47	
19	Mallorca B (R)	42	12	10	20	52	64	−12	46	Relegation to Segunda División B
20	Barcelona B (R)	42	13	5	24	51	68	−17	44	Relegation to Segunda División B
21	Hércules (R)	42	10	10	22	38	66	−28	40	Relegation to Segunda División B
22	Ourense (R)	42	7	6	29	35	82	−47	27	Relegation to Segunda División B

Rules for classification: 1st points; 2nd head-to-head points; 3rd head-to-head goal difference; 4th head-to-head goals scored; 5th goal difference; 6th number of goals scored; 7th Fair-play points
(R) Relegated

==== Results summary ====
Overall								Home						Away					
Pld	W	D	L	GF	GA	GD	Pts	W	D	L	GF	GA	GD	W	D	L	GF	GA	GD
42	13	5	24	51	68	−17	44	7	4	10	31	27	+4	6	1	14	20	41	−21

Source: Segunda División

==== Results by round ====
Round	1	2	3	4	5	6	7	8	9	10	11	12	13	14	15	16	17	18	19	20	21	22	23	24	25	26	27	28	29	30	31	32	33	34	35	36	37	38	39	40	41	42
Ground	A	H	A	H	A	H	A	H	A	H	A	H	A	H	A	H	H	A	H	A	H	H	A	H	A	H	A	H	A	H	A	H	A	H	A	H	A	A	H	A	H	A
Result	L	D	D	L	W	L	L	D	L	L	L	L	L	W	W	D	L	L	D	L	L	L	L	W	W	L	W	W	W	W	L	W	L	L	W	W	L	L	L	L	W	L
Position	21	18	18	21	15	18	20	19	20	20	21	22	22	22	21	19	20	22	22	22	22	22	22	21	21	21	21	19	19	18	19	19	19	19	19	19	19	19	19	20	20	20

Source: Segunda División
A = Away; H = Home; W = Win; D = Draw; L = Loss

==== Matches ====
30 August 1998 1	Mallorca B	4–1	Barcelona	Palma
--:-- CEST (UTC+2)				Stadium: Lluís Sitjar

5 September 1998 2	Barcelona B	1–1	Atlético Madrid B	Barcelona
--:-- CET (UTC+1)				Stadium: Mini Estadi

12 September 1998 3	Rayo Vallecano	0–0	Barcelona B	Madrid
--:-- CEST (UTC+2)				Stadium: Vallecas

19 September 1998 4	Barcelona B	1–2	Logroñés	Barcelona
--:-- CET (UTC+1)				Stadium: Mini Estadi

26 September 1998 5	Lleida	2–3	Barcelona B	Lleida
--:-- CEST (UTC+2)				Stadium: Camp d'Esports

3 October 1998 6	Barcelona B	0–4	Numancia	Barcelona
--:-- CET (UTC+1)				Stadium: Mini Estadi

10 October 1998 7	Compostela	2–1	Barcelona B	Santiago de Compostela
--:-- CEST (UTC+2)				Stadium: San Lázaro

17 October 1998 8	Barcelona B	2–2	Sevilla	Barcelona
--:-- CET (UTC+1)				Stadium: Mini Estadi

24 October 1998 9	Ourense	2–0	Barcelona B	Ourense
--:-- CEST (UTC+2)				Stadium: Estadio de O Couto

31 October 1998 10	Barcelona B	1–2	Recreativo	Barcelona
--:-- CET (UTC+1)				Stadium: Mini Estadi

8 November 1998 11	Mérida	4–2	Barcelona B	Mérida
--:-- CEST (UTC+2)				Stadium: Romano

14 November 1998 12	Barcelona B	0–2	Leganés	Barcelona
--:-- CET (UTC+1)				Stadium: Mini Estadi

22 November 1998 13	Badajoz	1–0	Barcelona B	Badajoz
--:-- CEST (UTC+2)				Stadium: Nuevo Vivero

28 November 1998 14	Barcelona B	4–0	Osasuna	Barcelona
--:-- CET (UTC+1)				Stadium: Mini Estadi

6 December 1998 15	Hércules	1–2	Barcelona B	Alicante
--:-- CEST (UTC+2)				Stadium: José Rico Pérez

12 December 1998 16	Barcelona B	1–1	Málaga	Barcelona
--:-- CET (UTC+1)				Stadium: Mini Estadi

19 December 1998 17	Barcelona B	0–1	Albacete	Barcelona
--:-- CET (UTC+1)				Stadium: Mini Estadi

2 January 1999 18	Toledo	2–1	Barcelona B	Toledo
--:-- CEST (UTC+2)				Stadium: Salto del Caballo

9 January 1999 19	Barcelona B	0–0	Eibar	Barcelona
--:-- CET (UTC+1)				Stadium: Mini Estadi

17 January 1999 20	Sporting Gijón	2–1	Barcelona B	Gijón
--:-- CEST (UTC+2)				Stadium: El Molinón

23 January 1999 21	Barcelona B	1–2	Las Palmas	Barcelona
--:-- CET (UTC+1)				Stadium: Mini Estadi

30 January 1999 22	Barcelona B	1–2	Mallorca B	Barcelona
--:-- CET (UTC+1)				Stadium: Mini Estadi

6 February 1999 23	Atlético Madrid B	2–0	Barcelona B	Madrid
--:-- CET (UTC+1)				Stadium: Cerro del Espino

14 February 1999 24	Barcelona B	1–0	Rayo Vallecano	Barcelona
--:-- CET (UTC+1)				Stadium: Mini Estadi

21 February 1999 25	Logroñés	0–1	Barcelona B	Logroño
--:-- CET (UTC+1)				Stadium: Las Gaunas

27 February 1999 26	Barcelona B	1–2	Lleida	Barcelona
--:-- CET (UTC+1)				Stadium: Mini Estadi

6 March 1999 27	Numancia	0–2	Barcelona B	Soria
--:-- CET (UTC+1)				Stadium: Municipal Los Pajaritos

13 March 1999 28	Barcelona B	1–0	Compostela	Barcelona
--:-- CET (UTC+1)				Stadium: Mini Estadi

20 March 1999 29	Sevilla	0–3	Barcelona B	Seville
--:-- CEST (UTC+2)				Stadium: Ramón Sánchez Pizjuán

27 March 1999 30	Barcelona B	5–0	Ourense	Barcelona
--:-- CET (UTC+1)				Stadium: Mini Estadi

3 April 1999 31	Recreativo	5–0	Barcelona B	Huelva
--:-- CET (UTC+1)				Stadium: Nuevo Colombino

10 April 1999 32	Barcelona B	3–1	Mérida	Barcelona
--:-- CET (UTC+1)				Stadium: Mini Estadi

17 April 1999 33	Leganés	2–0	Barcelona B	Leganés
--:-- CET (UTC+1)				Stadium: Butarque

24 April 1999 34	Barcelona B	0–1	Badajoz	Barcelona
--:-- CET (UTC+1)				Stadium: Mini Estadi

2 May 1999 35	Osasuna	1–2	Barcelona B	Pamplona
--:-- CET (UTC+1)				Stadium: El Sadar

9 May 1999 36	Barcelona B	4–1	Hércules	Barcelona
--:-- CET (UTC+1)				Stadium: Mini Estadi

15 May 1999 37	Málaga	2–0	Barcelona B	Málaga
--:-- CET (UTC+1)				Stadium: La Rosaleda

23 May 1999 38	Albacete	3–0	Barcelona B	Albacete
--:-- CEST (UTC+2)				Stadium: Carlos Belmonte

29 May 1999 39	Barcelona B	0–3	Toledo	Barcelona
--:-- CET (UTC+1)				Stadium: Mini Estadi

5 June 1999 40	Eibar	2–0	Barcelona B	Eibar
--:-- CET (UTC+1)				Stadium: Ipurua

12 June 1999 41	Barcelona B	4–0	Sporting Gijón	Barcelona
--:-- CET (UTC+1)				Stadium: Mini Estadi

20 June 1999 42	Las Palmas	4–1	Barcelona B	Las Palmas
--:-- CET (UTC+1)				Stadium: Insular
