= Francisco Mas =

Spanish footballer and manager

Personal information
- Full name: Francisco Mas Piquet
- Birth name: Francesc Mas i Piquet
- Date of birth: 13 January 1916
- Place of birth: Barcelona, Catalonia, Spain
- Date of death: 23 February 1998 (aged 82)
- Place of death: Barcelona, Catalonia, Spain
- Position: Forward

Youth career
- Penya Saprissa

Senior career*
Years	Team	Apps	(Gls)
1934–1936	CE Europa		
1939–1942	RCD Espanyol		
1942–1952	Granada CF		

International career
1941–1942	Catalonia	4	(2)

Managerial career
- 1950–1952: Granada CF
- * Club domestic league appearances and goals

Francisco Mas Piquet (13 January 1916 – 23 February 1998) was a Spanish footballer who played as a forward for RCD Espanyol and Granada CF. The highlight of his career was scoring the winning goal of the 1940 Spanish Cup final against Real Madrid in extra-time.

He later became a manager, being in charge of Granada CF between 1950 and 1952.

== Playing career ==
Born on 13 January 1916 in Barcelona, Mas began playing football at Penya Saprissa, the team in charge of training future RCD Espanyol players. He then played for a club in Sarrià and for CE Europa before joining RCD Espanyol in 1939, after the end of the Spanish Civil War.

In his first season at the club, he played a crucial role in helping his side win the 1939–40 Campionat de Catalunya, the last-ever edition of the Catalan championships, and then the 1940 Copa del Generalísimo, starting in the final against Real Madrid on 30 June, which ended in a 2–2 draw after 90 minutes, but then Mas netted the winner in the 110th minute to seal a famous victory for Espanyol. He played three seasons at Espanyol, until 1942, and in total, he scored 11 goals in 49 league games.

In 1942, Mas signed for Granada CF, where he played for ten seasons, three in the first division and the next seven in the Segunda División, playing a total of over 250 games for the club. In his last two seasons at the club, he worked as a Player-coach. He was a fast and technical left winger who scored many goals. He was a left winger, and since he was very complete, the coaches used him as a wild card in attacking positions, with the exception of center forward.

=== International career ===
Mas played 4 matches with the Catalan national team in 1941 and 1942, in which he scored two goals. He scored the first of his goals against a Stuttgart Selection side at Les Corts on 11 January 1941, which ended in a 3–3 draw.

== Death ==
Mas died on 23 February 1998, at the age of 82.

== Honours ==
RCD Espanyol

- Copa del Rey:
  - Champions (1): 1940
- Campionat de Catalunya:
  - Champions (1): 1939–40
