= Aces (parish) =

- Parish
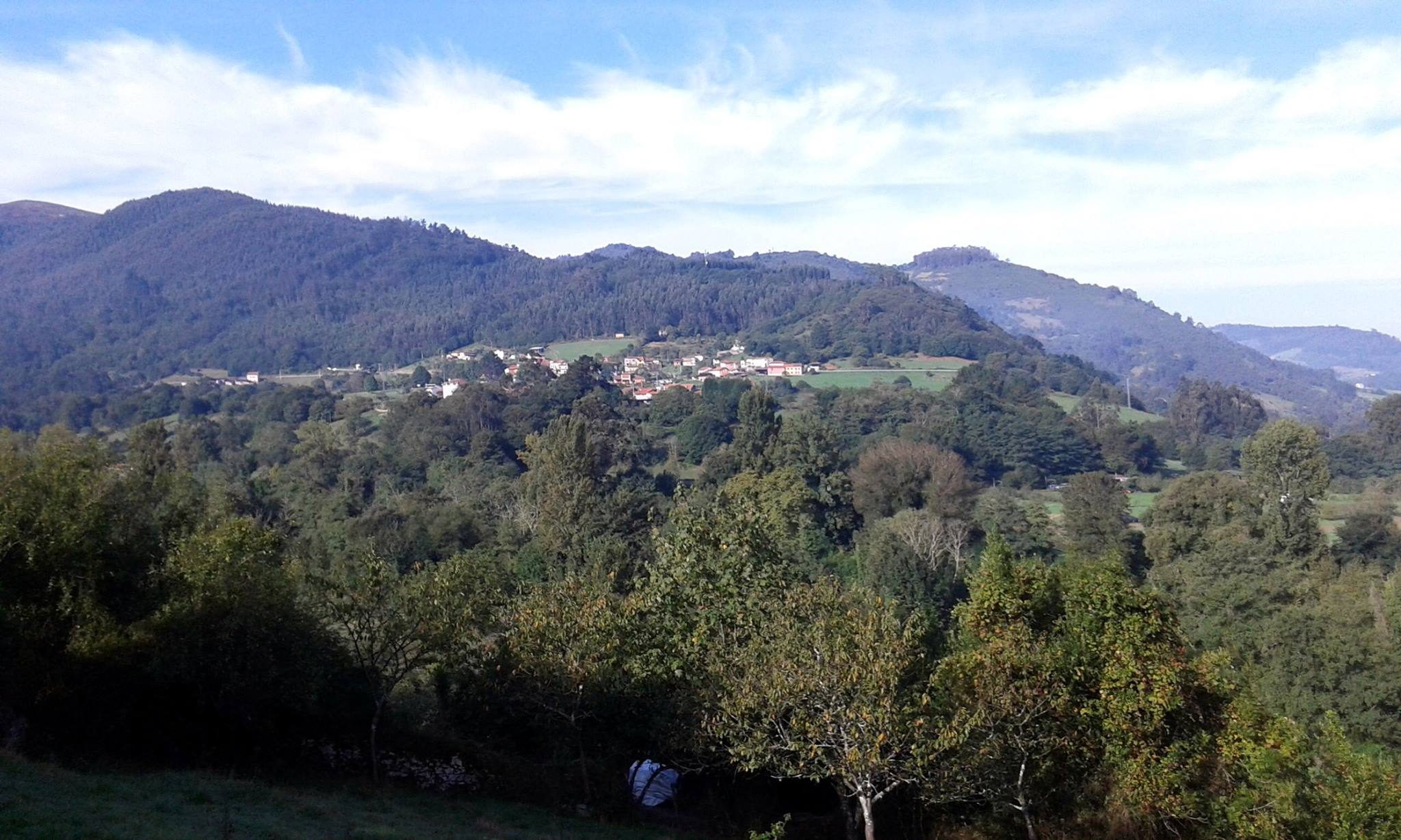

- Location within Spain
- Coordinates: 43°26′34″N 6°4′9″W
- Country: Spain
- Autonomous community: Asturias
- Province: Asturias
- Municipality: Candamo

Area
  - Total: 2.31 km^{2} (0.89 sq mi)

Population (2024)
  - Total: 73
  - Density: 32/km^{2} (82/sq mi)
- Time zone: UTC+1 (CET)

Aces is one of eleven parishes (administrative divisions) in Candamo, a municipality within the province and autonomous community of Asturias, in northern Spain. It is a town famous for its granaries of which there are over forty due to the abundance of chestnuts, which they are used to store.

It is 2.31 km^{2} (0.89 sq mi) in size with a population of 73 as of January 1, 2024.

It is located in the central area of the council, on the left bank of the river Nalón. It is bordered on the north by the parish of San Roman, to the northeast of the Valley on the east by the Crane, to the south of Prahu, and west by the San Tirso.

The main mode of communication of the parish is the CD-2 road, which links Aces Sandiche (Murias Parish) and Ferreras (parish of San Roman). It also has a station connecting to railway line built by the General Society of Asturian Basque Railways, which is now operated by LVEF and integrated into the local network of Asturias as line F-7, which communicates with Aces and San Esteban de Pravia Oviedo.

The parish is considered one of the areas of Asturias with a large number of granaries, most of them of great antiquity with numerous engravings on the doors. Prieto Bances refers to the weavers who used to be in Aces.

The parish church, dedicated to the Apostle Santiago, belonged to Queen Velasquita who in 1006 donated it to Bishop Ponce de Oviedo. The present building is nineteenth century but was rebuilt after the Spanish Civil War.

== Villages ==
- Barredo
- Forna
- Reguero
- Sucro
- Pueblo

== Bibliography ==
- Sociedad Asturiana de Estudios Económicos e Industriales: Nomenclátor de entidades de población de Asturias.
- Ayuntamiento de Candamo: Por el sur del concejo (archived 6 April 2010)
- Riu, Manuel: ["Poncio de Tabernoles, obispo de Oviedo" in Espacio, Tiempo y Forma, Serie 1, Revista de la Facultad de Geografía e Historia (UNED) (4), núm. 4, 1989, pp. 425–436]. ISSN 0214-4433.
- Miranda Duque, Andrea, and Rodríguez, Juan Ignacio Santos (2007): "Estructuras de poblamiento y paisaje medieval en Aces de Candamu", pp. 109–132, in Territorio, Sociedad y Poder, Revista de Estudios Medievales (Universidad de Oviedo) (2). (online version) ISSN 2341-1163.
- Feito Rodríguez, Honorio (1995): Evaristo San Miguel, la moderación de un exaltado. Fundación Alvargonzález, Gijón. ISBN 9788460544227.
- Fernández Conde, Francisco Javier (2014): Historia de Candamu: Orígenes-1500. Ediciones TREA, Gijón. ISBN 9788497047968.
