= 1939–40 Campionat de Catalunya =

Campionat de Catalunya
- Season: 1939–40
- Champions: Espanyol
- Matches: 30
- Goals: 118 (3.93 per match)
- Top goalscorer: Vicente Martínez (14 goals)
- Biggest home win: Barcelona 11–0 Badalona (5 November 1939)
- Biggest away win: Granollers 1–5 Espanyol (5 November 1939)
- Highest scoring: Barcelona 11–0 Badalona (5 November 1939)

The 1939–40 Campionat de Catalunya season was the 40th and last since its establishment and was played between 24 September and 19 November 1939.

== Overview before the season ==
Six teams joined the Division One league, including two that would play the 1939–40 La Liga and four from the 1939–40 Segunda División.

From La Liga

- Barcelona
- Espanyol

From Segunda División

- Badalona
- Girona
- Granollers
- Sabadell

== Division One ==
=== League table ===
Pos	Team	Pld	W	D	L	GF	GA	GD	Pts	Qualification or relegation
1	Espanyol (C)	10	9	1	0	35	11	+24	19	Qualification for Copa del Rey
2	Girona	10	6	1	3	17	12	+5	13	Qualification for Copa del Rey
3	Barcelona	10	5	0	5	29	20	+9	10	Qualification for Copa del Rey
4	Badalona	10	5	0	5	16	32	−16	10	
5	Granollers	10	2	1	7	13	20	−7	5	
6	Sabadell	10	1	1	8	8	23	−15	3	

Source: BDFútbol
Rules for classification: 1) points; 2) head-to-head points; 3) head-to-head goal difference; 4) goal difference; 5) number of goals scored
(C) Champions

=== Results ===
Home \ Away	BAD	FCB	ESP	GIR	GRA	SAB
Badalona	—	1–2	2–4	2–1	2–1	4–3
Barcelona	11–0	—	3–5	2–3	3–2	4–0
Espanyol	6–0	3–0	—	2–1	4–2	2–0
Girona	3–1	1–0	2–2	—	3–1	2–0
Granollers	0–1	1–2	1–5	2–0	—	3–0
Sabadell	1–3	4–2	0–2	0–1	0–0	—

Source: BDFútbol
Legend: Blue = home team win; Yellow = draw; Red = away team win.

=== Top goalscorers ===
Goalscorers	Goals	Team
(Spain) Vicente Martínez	14	Espanyol
(Spain) Salvador Galvany	8	Granollers
(Spain) Gabriel Jorge	6	Espanyol
(Spain) Emilín	6	Barcelona
(Spain) Juli Gonzalvo	5	Espanyol

== Division Two ==
=== League table ===
Pos	Team	Pld	W	D	L	GF	GA	GD	Pts	Qualification or relegation
1	Sant Andreu	14	11	1	2	49	18	+31	23	Qualification for Copa del Rey
2	Europa	14	8	1	5	47	19	+28	17	
3	Júpiter	14	7	2	5	35	22	+13	16	
4	Terrassa	14	6	3	5	27	29	−2	15	
5	Vic	14	7	1	6	42	31	+11	15	
6	Martinenc	14	2	6	6	23	42	−19	10	
7	Sants	14	3	2	9	20	54	−34	8	
8	Horta	14	3	1	10	17	43	−26	7	

Source: BDFútbol
Rules for classification: 1) points; 2) head-to-head points; 3) head-to-head goal difference; 4) goal difference; 5) number of goals scored
