= Prahúa =

Prahúa Praúa
- Parish
- Location within Spain
- Coordinates: 43°29′N 6°6′W
- Country: Spain
- Autonomous community: Asturias
- Province: Asturias
- Municipality: Candamo

Area
  - Total: 7.77 km^{2} (3.00 sq mi)

Population (2024)
  - Total: 78
  - Density: 10/km^{2} (26/sq mi)
- Time zone: UTC+1 (CET)

Prahúa (Asturian: Praúa) is one of eleven parishes (administrative divisions) in Candamo, a municipality within the province and autonomous community of Asturias, in northern Spain.

It is 7.77 km^{2} (3.00 sq mi) in size with a population of 78 as of January 1, 2024.

== Villages ==
- La Mortera
- Prahúa
