= San Tirso =

San Tirso San Tisu
- Parish
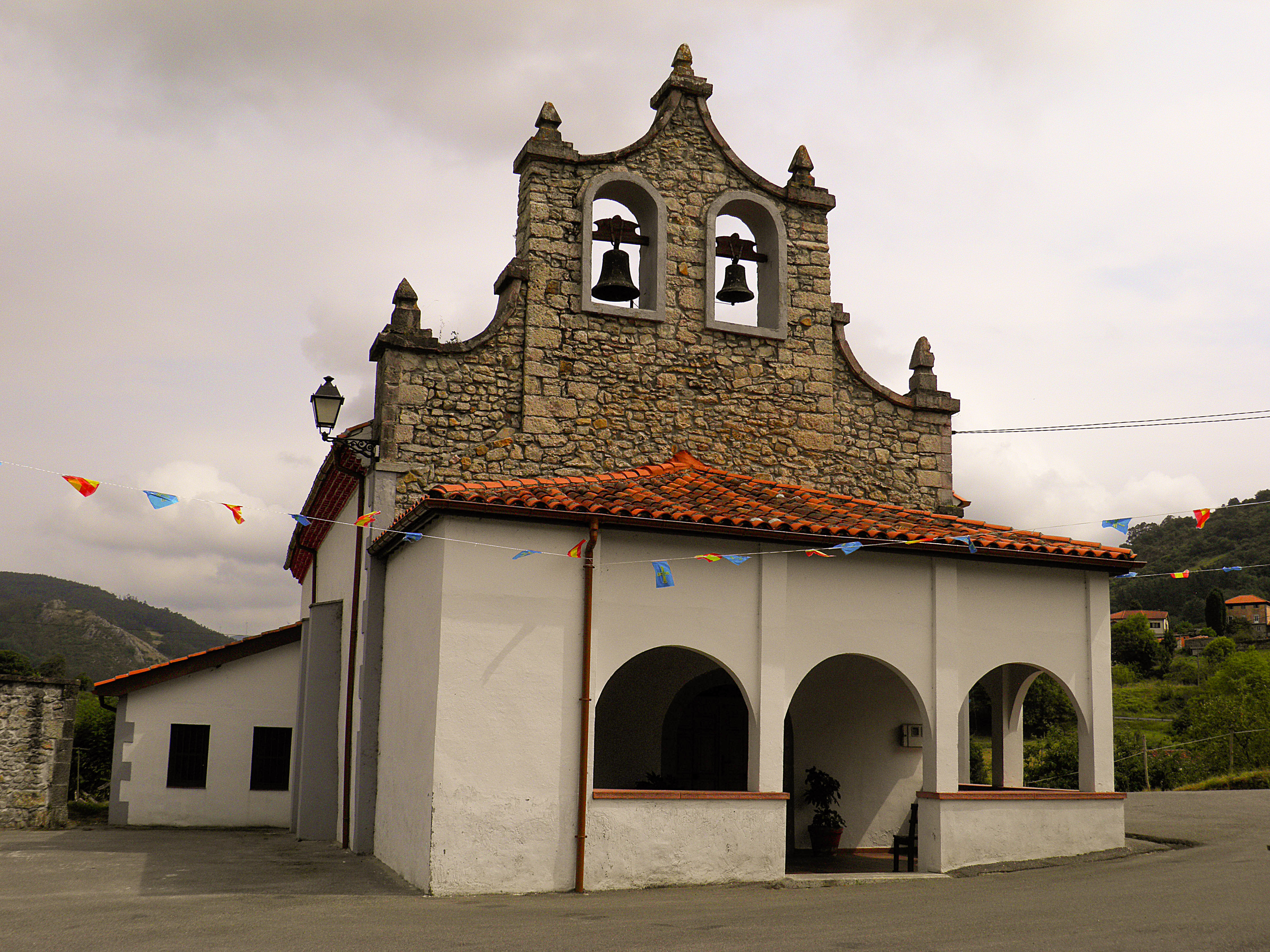

- Location within Spain
- Coordinates: 43°27′N 6°5′W
- Country: Spain
- Autonomous community: Asturias
- Province: Asturias
- Municipality: Candamo

Area
  - Total: 7.59 km^{2} (2.93 sq mi)

Population (2024)
  - Total: 123
  - Density: 16.2/km^{2} (42.0/sq mi)
- Time zone: UTC+1 (CET)

San Tirso (Asturian: San Tisu) is one of eleven parishes (administrative divisions) in Candamo, a municipality within the province and autonomous community of Asturias, in northern Spain.

It is 7.59 km^{2} (2.93 sq mi) in size with a population of 123 as of January 1, 2024.

== Villages ==
- Otero
- Villa
- San Tirso
