= Salvador Galvany =

Spanish footballer (1916–1974)

Personal information
- Full name: Salvador Galvany Ventura
- Birth name: Salvador Galvany i Ventura
- Date of birth: 12 June 1916
- Place of birth: La Garriga, Spain
- Date of death: 9 June 1974 (aged 57)
- Place of death: La Garriga, Spain
- Position: Forward

Senior career*
Years	Team	Apps	(Gls)
1933–1934	Granollers		
1934–1935	Sabadell		
1935–1937	Júpiter	48	(4)
1939–1940	Granollers		
1940–1944	Barcelona	0	(0)
1940	→ Badalona (on loan)		
1940–1941	→ Osasuna (on loan)		
1941–1942	→ CE Europa (on loan)		
1944	Constància		
1944–1948	Granada	5	(16)
1948	Real Oviedo		
1948–1949	Real Zaragoza	15	(8)
1949	Vilanova		
1950	Sant Andreu		
1950	Santboià		
1951	Sant Martí		
1951	Santboià		
1951–1952	Igualada		
1952	Arenys de Mar		
Total		5	(16)
- * Club domestic league appearances and goals

Salvador Galvany Ventura (12 June 1916 – 9 June 1974) was a Spanish footballer who played as a forward for Barcelona, Osasuna, Granada, Real Oviedo, and Real Zaragoza in the 1940s.

== Career ==
=== Pre-civil war ===
Born in the Catalonian town of La Garriga on 12 June 1916, Galvany began his career at Granollers in 1933, aged 17, from which he joined Segunda División team Sabadell in 1934. A few weeks later, on 29 July 1934, he started for Sabadell against the Catalan national team in a tribute match to benefit Sabadell player Santiago Sitges, who had been hospitalized after a motorcycle accident a few days earlier; it ended in a 1–1 draw. In his first (and only) season there, he played 20 official matches, helping his side achieve an unprecedented runner-up finish in the 1934–35 Campionat de Catalunya as well as reaching the final of the 1935 Copa del Rey, which ended in a 3–0 loss to Sevilla.

That summer, Galvany signed for Júpiter, with whom he played another match against Catalonia, this time in the final of the Torneig Copa Balenguera on 1 January 1936, scoring once to help his side to a 3–2 victory. He stayed at Júpiter until 1936, when his career was interrupted by the outbreak of the Spanish Civil War.

=== FC Barcelona ===
Once the conflict was over, Galvany returned to Granollers, scoring 8 goals in the 1939–40 Campionat de Catalunya, which saw him finish as the tournament's second-highest scorer, behind only Vicente Martínez Català. At Granollers, he played alongside Máximo Aylagas, but before the end of the season, in March 1940, both of them were signed by Barcelona, making their debut with the first team in friendlies against Sant Andreu, and their competitive debut in the 1940 Copa del Generalísimo, with Galvany scoring once in a 9–2 aggregate win over Atlético Baleares in the first round.

Despite staying at Barça for a further four years, the 1940 Cup was the last time he played an official match for the club, being restricted only to friendlies, and being loaned a total of three times, to Badalona (1940), Osasuna (1940–41), and CE Europa (1941–42).

=== Later career ===
After leaving Barça in 1944, Galvany had a brief stint at Constància, from which he joined Granada in 1944, with whom he played for four years, until 1948. In his first season there, he scored 5 goals in 16 La Liga matches as the club was relegated, with Galvany only returning to the top flight when he joined Real Oviedo in 1948. That same year, however, he dropped to the Tercera División for the first time in his career, when he signed for Real Zaragoza, scoring 8 goals in 15 matches in the 1948–1949 season. His younger brother Pedro also played for Zaragoza.

In the early 1950s, Galvany played for numerous modest Catalan sides, including some third division teams, such as Sant Andreu (1950), Sant Martí (1951), and Igualada (1952), but also Santboià and Arenys de Mar.

== Death ==
Galvany died in La Garriga on 9 June 1974, at the age of 57.
