= Fenolleda, Asturias =

Fenolleda Fenoeda
- Parish
- Location within Spain
- Country: Spain
- Autonomous community: Asturias
- Province: Asturias
- Municipality: Candamo

Area
  - Total: 7.21 km^{2} (2.78 sq mi)

Population (2024)
  - Total: 191
  - Density: 26.5/km^{2} (68.6/sq mi)
- Time zone: UTC+1 (CET)
- Postal code: 33828

Fenolleda (Asturian: Fenoeda) is one of eleven parishes (administrative divisions) in Candamo, a municipality within the province and autonomous community of Asturias, in northern Spain.

It is 7.21 km^{2} (2.78 sq mi) in size with a population of 191 as of January 1, 2024.

== Villages ==
- Beifar
- Fenolleda
- Santa Eulalia
- Espinosa
- Fontebona
- Ricabo
- Santoseso
- Valdemora
