= Llameiru =

- Parish
- Location within Asturias Location within Spain
- Coordinates: 43°27′N 6°2′W
- Country: Spain
- Autonomous community: Asturias
- Province: Asturias
- Municipality: Candamo

Area
  - Total: 7.4 km^{2} (2.9 sq mi)

Population (2024)
  - Total: 170
  - Density: 23/km^{2} (59/sq mi)
- Time zone: UTC+1 (CET)

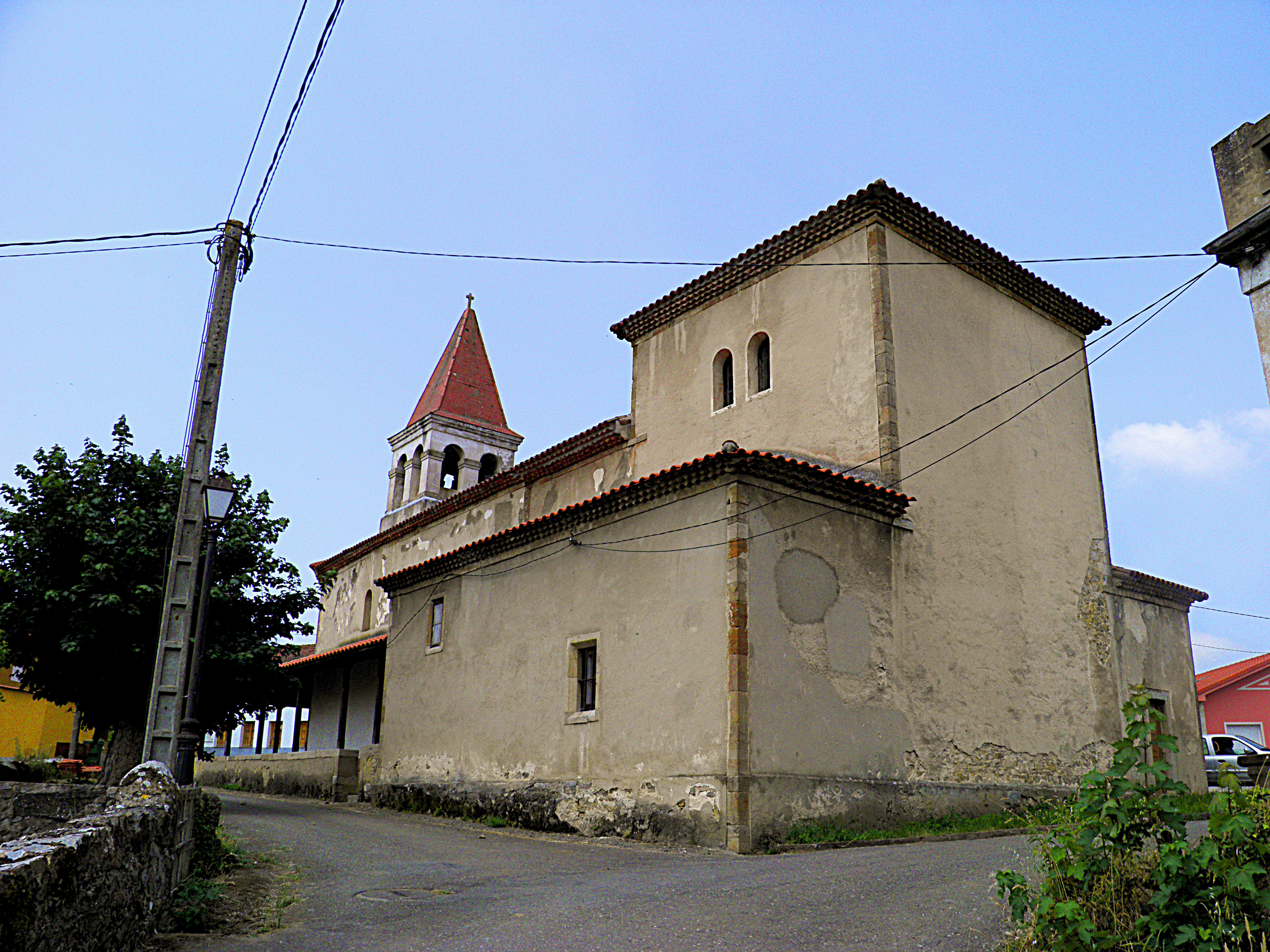

Llameiru (Spanish: Llamero) is one of eleven parishes (administrative divisions) in Candamo, a municipality within the province and autonomous community of Asturias, in northern Spain.

It is 7.4 km^{2} (2.9 sq mi) in size with a population of 170 as of January 1, 2024.

== Villages ==
- El Monte Pop. 2011 - 10
- Ferreiros Pop. 2011 - 67
- Llameiru Pop. 2011 - 127
- Villanueva Pop. 2011 - 24
