= Cuero (Candamo) =

Cuero Cueru
- Parish
- Location within Spain
- Country: Spain
- Autonomous community: Asturias
- Province: Asturias
- Municipality: Candamo

Area
  - Total: 2.61 km^{2} (1.01 sq mi)

Population (2024)
  - Total: 168
  - Density: 64.4/km^{2} (167/sq mi)
- Time zone: UTC+1 (CET)
- Postal code: 33829

Cuero (Asturian: Cueru) is one of eleven parishes in Candamo, a municipality within the province and autonomous community of Asturias, in northern Spain.

It is 2.61 km^{2} (1.01 sq mi) in size with a population of 168 as of January 1, 2024.

== Villages ==
- Cuero
- El Campillín
- El Puente Peñaflor
