= Murias (Candamo) =

- Parish
- Location within Spain
- Country: Spain
- Autonomous community: Asturias
- Province: Asturias
- Municipality: Candamo

Area
  - Total: 8.9 km^{2} (3.4 sq mi)

Population (2024)
  - Total: 236
  - Density: 27/km^{2} (69/sq mi)
- Time zone: UTC+1 (CET)

Murias is one of eleven parishes (administrative divisions) in Candamo, a municipality within the province and autonomous community of Asturias, in northern Spain.

It is 8.9 km^{2} (3.4 sq mi) in size with a population of 236 as of January 1, 2024.

== Villages ==
- Agüera
- Bohles
- El Caleyo
- Figaredo
- Murias
- Sandiche
- Villamarin
- Villar
