= El Valle (Candamo) =

- Parish
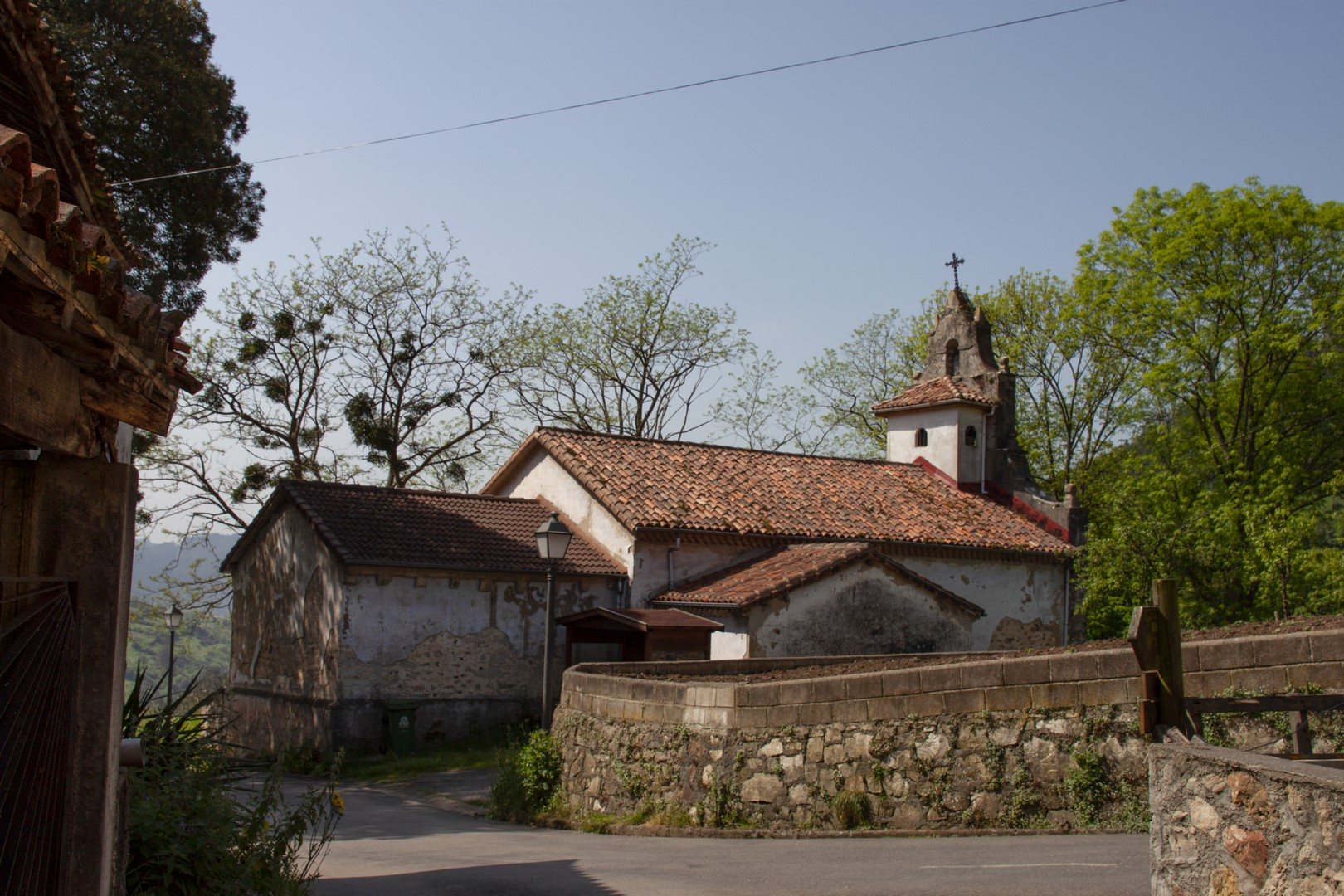
- El Valle

- Location within Spain
- Coordinates: 43°27′02″N 6°13′54″W
- Country: Spain
- Autonomous community: Asturias
- Province: Asturias
- Municipality: Candamo

Area
  - Total: 5.41 km^{2} (2.09 sq mi)

Population (2024)
  - Total: 126
  - Density: 23.3/km^{2} (60.3/sq mi)
- Time zone: UTC+1 (CET)

El Valle is one of eleven parishes (administrative divisions) in Candamo, a municipality within the province and autonomous community of Asturias, in northern Spain.

It is 5.41 km^{2} (2.09 sq mi) in size with a population of 126 as of January 1, 2024.

== Villages ==
- Canales
- Candamin
- El Valle
