= Emilín (footballer, born September 1912) =

Spanish footballer

Personal information
- Full name: Emilio García Martínez
- Date of birth: 12 September 1912
- Place of birth: San Román de Candamo, Spain
- Date of death: 30 March 1977 (aged 64)
- Place of death: Oviedo, Spain
- Positions: Forward; winger

Youth career
- Juvencia
- 1928–1931: Oviedo

Senior career*
| Years | Team | Apps | (Gls) |
| 1931–1949 | Oviedo | 277 | (64) |
| 1939–1940 | → Barcelona (loan) | 16 | (5) |
| 1949–1951 | Sporting Gijón | 24 | (10) |

International career
| 1942 | Spain | 2 | (0) |
- * Club domestic league appearances and goals

Emilio García Martínez (12 September 1912 – 30 March 1977), commonly known as Emilín, was a Spanish footballer who played as a forward.

== Club career ==
Born in San Román, Candamo, Asturias, Emílin graduated from Real Oviedo's youth setup. He made his senior debut in 1931, aged 19, and soon established himself as a regular figure in the club.

At Oviedo, Emilín was part of the popular Delantera Eléctrica ("the electric forwards"), a forward line of quick, youthful talent that outperformed teams using fast-paced, highly skilled plays. He possessed a skilled technique and was famous for his corners, and managed to score a number of goals from the corner, today called Olympic goals.

Emilín played 277 games for Real Oviedo, 227 of them in La Liga, scoring 64 goals, being the sixth best scorer in the Azules history. He subsequently represented FC Barcelona and Sporting de Gijón, retiring with the latter in 1951, aged 39.

== International career ==
Emilín was capped twice with Spain's main squad, all of them in 1942.
