= Jaume Elías =

Spanish footballer

Jaume Elias
Personal information
- Full name: Jaume Elias i Casas
- Date of birth: 6 November 1919
- Place of birth: Barcelona, Spain
- Date of death: 18 September 1977 (aged 57)
- Place of death: Barcelona, Spain
- Position: Defender

Youth career
- CE Europa

Senior career*
| Years | Team | Apps | (Gls) |
| 1940–1943 | RCD Espanyol | 62 | (0) |
| 1943–1949 | Barcelona | 123 | (0) |

International career
| 1941–1947 | Catalonia | 5 | (0) |
- * Club domestic league appearances and goals

Jaume Elías i Casas (6 November 1919 – 18 September 1977) was a Spanish footballer who played for FC Barcelona between 1943 and 1949. During his career he also played for RCD Espanyol from 1940 until 1943.

== Career ==
Elías was born in Barcelona in 1919 and began his career in the youth ranks of CE Europa. In 1940 he signed a contract with RCD Espanyol and won the Spanish Cup in his first season. In the following year RCD Espanyol reached the finals again but this time they were defeated by Valencia CF. In 1943 he left for FC Barcelona and in his time at Barcelona he played in 123 league matches and anchored a defensive line with teammate José Puig Puig. He left football in 1949 with only 30 years of age.

== Honours ==
RCD Espanyol

- Spanish Cup: 1939-40

Barcelona

- Spanish League: 1944-45, 1947–48, 1948–49
- Latin Cup: 1949
- Copa de Oro Argentina: 1944-45
- Copa Eva Duarte: 1947-48
