= Julio Garceran de Vall =

Cuban judge

Julio Garceran de Vall (1907–1989) was a Supreme Court Justice of Cuba. He headed a provisional Cuban government-in-exile in the early 1960s. He was a municipal court judge from 1934 to 1946, and later a Supreme Court justice from 1948 to 1959. He died in 1989.
