= Enrique Esquiva =

Spanish footballer and manager

Personal information
- Full name: Enrique Esquiva González
- Date of birth: 1 September 1916
- Place of birth: Mejorada del Campo, Madrid, Spain
- Date of death: 25 June 2003 (aged 86)
- Place of death: Madrid, Spain
- Position: Goalkeeper

Senior career*
| Years | Team | Apps | (Gls) |
| 1934–1936 | Nacional de Madrid | | |
| 1939–1943 | Real Madrid | 39 | (0) |
- * Club domestic league appearances and goals

Enrique Esquiva González (1 September 1916 – 25 June 2003) was a Spanish footballer who played as a goalkeeper for Real Madrid between 1939 and 1943.

== Playing career ==
Esquiva was born in Mejorada del Campo, Madrid, on 1 September 1916, (Note: Some sources wrongly claim that he was born on 19 August 1916.) as the son of Joaquín and Dolores. He began his football career at his hometown club Nacional de Madrid in 1934, aged 18, but his career was interrupted by the outbreak of the Spanish Civil War.

After the War, Esquiva joined the ranks of Real Madrid in 1939, and together with the likes of Jacinto Quincoces, Chus Alonso, and Simón Lecue, he was a member of the Madrid squad that reached the final of the Copa del Rey in 1940 on 30 June, which ended in a 3–2 loss to RCD Espanyol. Three months earlier, on 3 March, Esquiva had conceded five goals from Espanyol in a league fixture that ended in a 5–4 loss, and in doing so, he became only the fourth goalkeeper in Madrid's history to concede four goals in a single match. In June 1941, he started in both legs of the final of the 1941 Copa Presidente Federación Castellana against Atlético Madrid, which ended in a 3–1 loss on aggregate. In total, Esquiva played 51 official matches with the club, including 39 La Liga matches, 9 cup matches, and 3 in the regional championship. He also played eight friendly games (unofficial).

Esquiva remained a member of Real Madrid until he died on the morning of 25 June 2003, at the age of 86.

== Honours ==
Madrid FC

- Copa del Rey:
  - Runner-up (1): 1940
- Copa Presidente Federación Castellana
  - Runner-up (1): 1940–41

== See also ==
- List of Real Madrid CF players
