= San Román (Candamo) =

- Parish
- Location within Spain
- Country: Spain
- Autonomous community: Asturias
- Province: Asturias
- Municipality: Candamo

Area
  - Total: 5.2 km^{2} (2.0 sq mi)

Population (2024)
  - Total: 276
  - Density: 53/km^{2} (140/sq mi)
- Time zone: UTC+1 (CET)

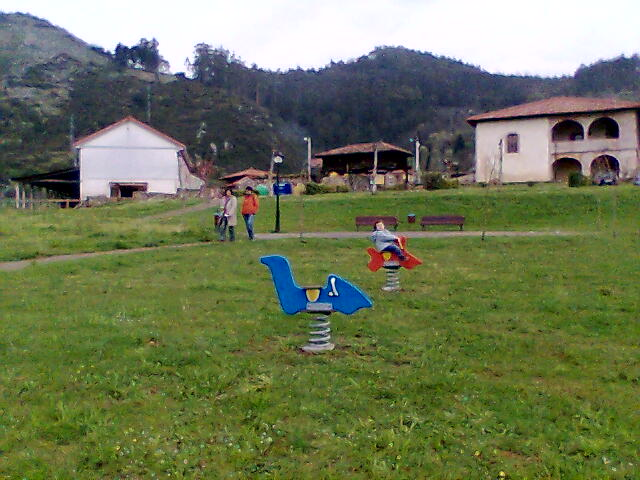
Playground in San Román

San Román is one of eleven parishes (administrative divisions) in Candamo, a municipality within the province and autonomous community of Asturias, in northern Spain.

It is 5.2 km^{2} (2.0 sq mi) in size with a population of 276 as of January 1, 2024.

== Villages ==
- Ferreras
- Las Parrucas
- San Román

== Demography ==
Dates by INE
