= Candamo =

Candamo Candamu
- Municipality
- Flag Coat of arms

- Location in Spain
- Coordinates: 43°26′48″N 6°3′29″W
- Country: Spain
- Autonomous community: Asturias
- Province: Asturias
- Comarca: Avilés
- Judicial district: Pravia
- Capital: Grullos

Government
  - Alcalde: José Antonio García Vega (PSOE)

Area
  - Total: 71.97 km^{2} (27.79 sq mi)
- Highest elevation: 613 m (2,011 ft)

Population (2025-01-01)
  - Total: 1,902
  - Density: 26.43/km^{2} (68.45/sq mi)
- Demonym: candamín / candamina
- Time zone: UTC+1 (CET)
  - Summer (DST): UTC+2 (CEST)
- Postal code: 33828 and 33829
- Website: Official website

Candamo (Asturian: Candamu) is a municipality in the Autonomous Community of the Principality of Asturias, Spain. It is bordered on the east by Las Regueras, on the south by Grado, on the north by Illas, Castrillón and Soto del Barco, and on the west by Pravia and Salas.

== History ==
Around Candamo and specially on the shores of the Rio Nalon many paleolithic artifacts have been found. The first documentation about Candamo is from the 11th century and was found in a Monastery archive.

=== Coat of arms ===
- Left: the coat of arms from Grado.
- Right: a symbol for the boards, Don Pelayo used, to build a bridge over the river, to cross with his soldiers.

== Parishes ==
- Aces
- Cuero (Asturian: Cueiru)
- Fenolleda (Fenoyeda)
- Grullos
- Llamero (Llameiru)
- Murias
- Prahúa (Praúa)
- San Román
- San Tirso (San Tisu)
- El Valle
- Ventosa

== Politics ==
| | PSOE | PP | IU-BA | CDS | Andere | Total |
|---|---|---|---|---|---|---|
| 1979 | 1 | 0 | 6 | 0 | 4 | 11 |
| 1983 | 1 | 2 | 8 | - | 0 | 11 |
| 1987 | - | - | 3 | 2 | 6 | 11 |
| 1991 | 9 | 0 | 2 | 0 | 0 | 11 |
| 1995 | 7 | 3 | 1 | - | 0 | 11 |
| 1999 | 9 | 1 | 1 | - | 0 | 11 |
| 2003 | 8 | 2 | 1 | - | 0 | 11 |
| 2007 | 8 | 2 | 1 | - | 0 | 11 |

== Demography ==
by: Instituto Nacional de Estadística de España - grafic for Wikipedia

== Points of interest ==
- El palacio de Valdés Bazán, from 17th century
- La casa de la Torre,
- El palacio de Cañedo
- El palacio de los Casares in San Tirso

== See also ==
- Instituto Nacional de Estadística (Spain)
- List of municipalities in Asturias
