= Grullos =

- Parish
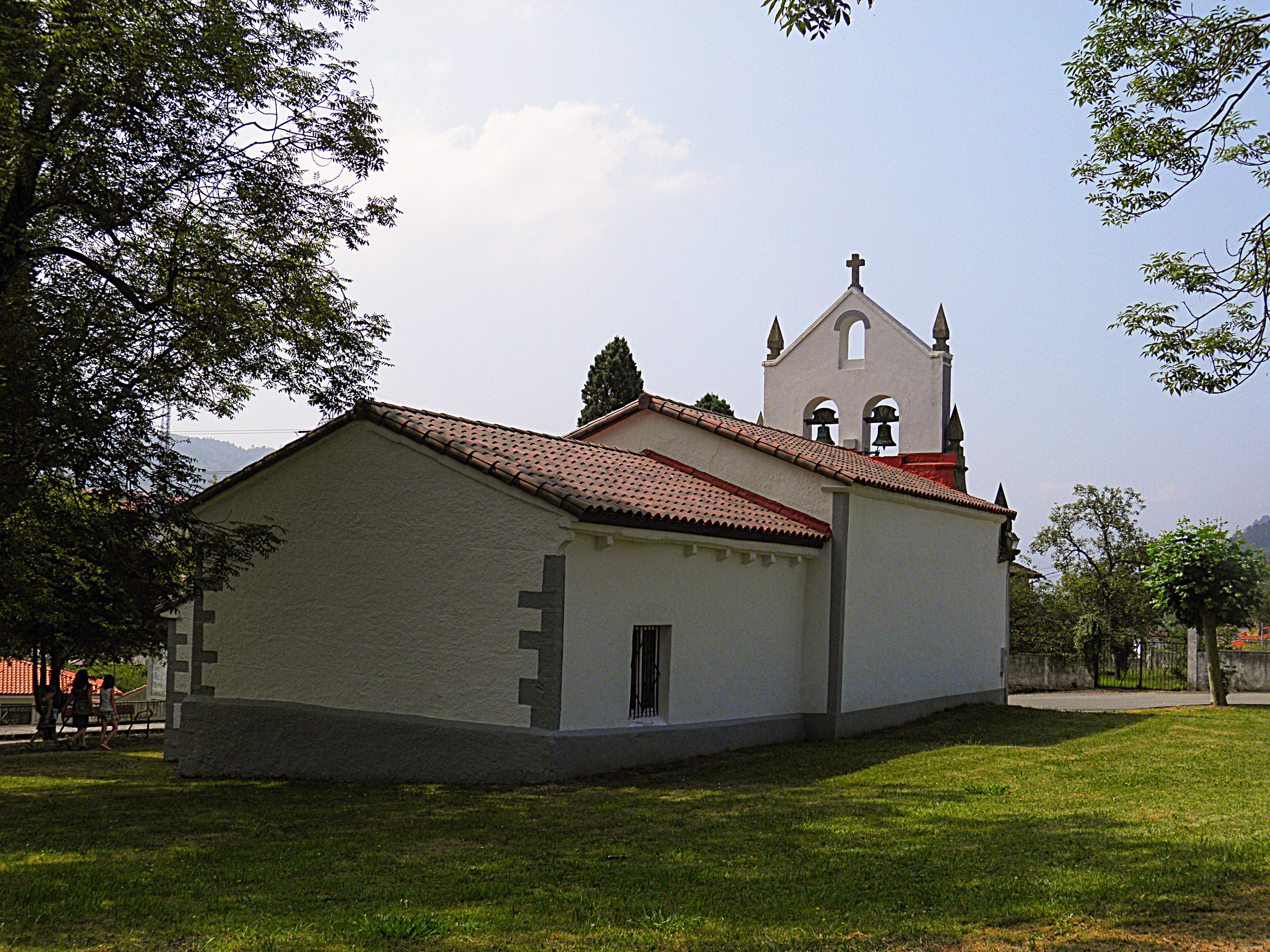

- Location within Spain
- Coordinates: 43°26′N 6°3′W
- Country: Spain
- Autonomous community: Asturias
- Province: Asturias
- Municipality: Candamo

Area
  - Total: 3.89 km^{2} (1.50 sq mi)

Population (2024)
  - Total: 193
  - Density: 49.6/km^{2} (129/sq mi)
- Time zone: UTC+1 (CET)
- Postal code: 33829

Grullos is one of eleven parishes (administrative divisions) in Candamo, a municipality within the province and autonomous community of Asturias, in northern Spain.

It is 3.89 km^{2} (1.50 sq mi) in size with a population of 193 as of January 1, 2024.
