= 1936–37 Campionat de Catalunya =

Campionat de Catalunya
- Season: 1936–37
- Champions: Espanyol
- Matches: 30
- Goals: 123 (4.1 per match)
- Top goalscorer: Miguel Gual (9 goals)
- Biggest home win: Espanyol 9–3 Badalona (13 December 1936)
- Biggest away win: Espanyol 1–4 Granollers (11 October 1936); Granollers 1–4 Espanyol (29 November 1936)
- Highest scoring: Espanyol 9–3 Badalona (13 December 1936)

The 1936–37 Campionat de Catalunya season was the 38th since its establishment and was played between 4 October and 20 December 1936.

== Division One ==
=== League table ===
Pos	Team	Pld	W	D	L	GF	GA	GD	Pts	Qualification or relegation
1	Espanyol (C)	10	7	0	3	29	23	+6	14	Qualification for Mediterranean League
2	Barcelona	10	5	2	3	24	16	+8	12	Qualification for Mediterranean League
3	Girona	10	4	2	4	18	13	+5	10	Qualification for Mediterranean League
4	Granollers	10	4	1	5	18	20	−2	9	Qualification for Mediterranean League
5	Sabadell	10	3	2	5	16	19	−3	8	
6	Badalona	10	3	1	6	18	32	−14	7	

Source: BDFútbol
Rules for classification: 1) points; 2) head-to-head points; 3) head-to-head goal difference; 4) goal difference; 5) number of goals scored
(C) Champions

=== Results ===
Home \ Away	BAD	FCB	ESP	GIR	GRA	SAB
Badalona	—	4–2	1–2	2–1	2–3	3–3
Barcelona	4–1	—	5–1	3–0	2–4	1–1
Espanyol	9–3	1–2	—	3–2	1–4	3–2
Girona	4–0	1–1	2–3	—	3–0	3–0
Granollers	0–1	1–3	1–4	1–1	—	3–1
Sabadell	4–1	2–1	1–2	0–1	2–1	—

Source: BDFútbol
Legend: Blue = home team win; Yellow = draw; Red = away team win.

=== Top goalscorers ===
Goalscorers	Goals	Team
(Spain) Miguel Gual	9	Barcelona
(Spain) Antonio Chas	8	Espanyol
(Spain) Guix	7	Granollers
(Spain) Francisco Betancourt	6	Badalona
(Spain) José Espada	5	Espanyol

== Division Two ==
=== League table ===
Pos	Team	Pld	W	D	L	GF	GA	GD	Pts	Qualification or relegation
1	Martinenc	14	9	1	4	33	24	+9	19	Qualification for promotion league
2	Vic	14	8	2	4	33	30	+3	18	Qualification for promotion league
3	Europa (P)	14	7	3	4	30	20	+10	17	Qualification for promotion league
4	Júpiter (P)	14	6	5	3	19	32	−13	17	Qualification for promotion league
5	Terrassa	14	6	2	6	36	21	+15	14	
6	Sant Andreu	14	6	0	8	25	30	−5	12	
7	Sants	14	3	3	8	27	32	−5	9	
8	Horta	14	2	2	10	17	36	−19	6	

Source: BDFútbol
Rules for classification: 1) points; 2) head-to-head points; 3) head-to-head goal difference; 4) goal difference; 5) number of goals scored
(P) Promoted
