= Ventosa, Asturias =

Ventosa
- Parish
- Location within Spain
- Coordinates: 43°28′N 6°0′W
- Country: Spain
- Autonomous community: Asturias
- Province: Asturias
- Municipality: Candamo

Area
  - Total: 13.68 km^{2} (5.28 sq mi)

Population (2024)
  - Total: 263
  - Density: 19.2/km^{2} (49.8/sq mi)
- Time zone: UTC+1 (CET)

Ventosa is one of eleven parishes (administrative divisions) in Candamo, a municipality within the province and autonomous community of Asturias, in northern Spain.

It is 13.68 km^{2} (5.28 sq mi) in size with a population of 320.

== Villages ==
- Faces
- Faedo
- La Mafalla
- Las Pandiellas
- Pulide
- La Rebolada
- Reznera
- Tablado
- Los Valles
- Argañosa
- Las Paciones
- La Reigada
- La Ronada
- Ventosa
