= Gabriel Jorge =

Spanish footballer (1916–2014)

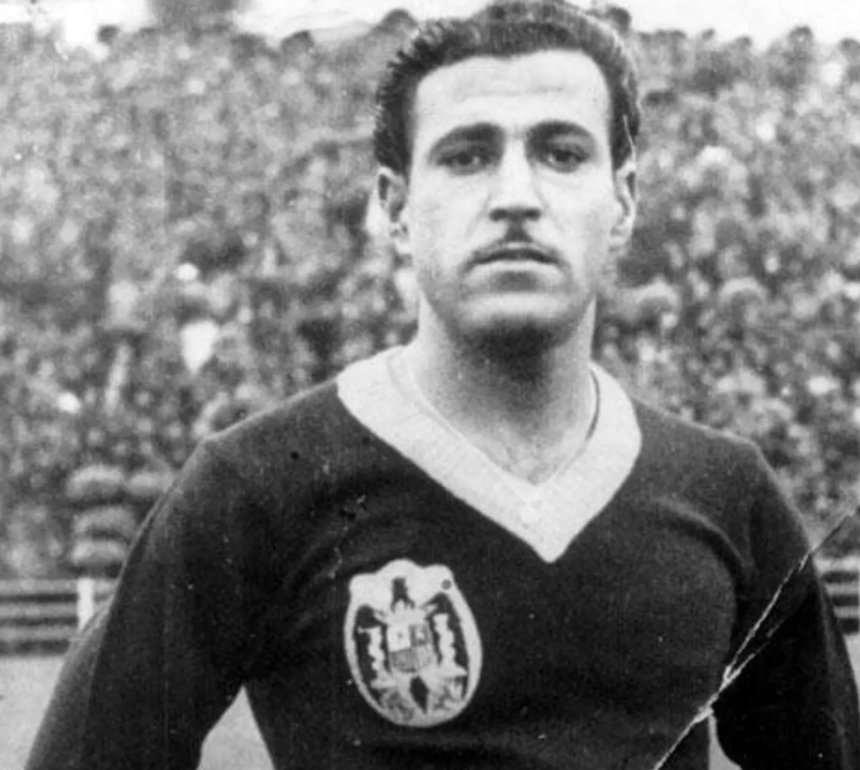

Personal information
- Full name: Gabriel Jorge Sosa
- Date of birth: 26 June 1916
- Place of birth: Santa Cruz de Tenerife, Spain
- Date of death: 28 November 2014 (aged 98)
- Place of death: Santa Cruz de Tenerife, Spain
- Position: Forward

Youth career
- Real Unión

Senior career*
Years	Team	Apps	(Gls)
1933–1935	Real Unión		
1935–1936	Tenerife		
1939–1947	Espanyol	158	(50)
1947–1951	Badalona		

International career
1941	Spain	1	(0)
1941–1944	Catalonia	3	(0)
- * Club domestic league appearances and goals

Gabriel Jorge Sosa (26 June 1916 – 28 November 2014) was a Spanish footballer who played as a forward for Espanyol and the Spanish national team in the 1940s. He is the sixth-highest goal scorer in Espanyol's history with 81 goals, including two goals in the 1940 Spanish Cup final against Real Madrid in a 3–2 extra-time victory.

== Career ==
=== Club career ===
Born on 26 June 1916 in the Canary Islands town of Santa Cruz de Tenerife, Jorge began his career in the youth ranks of his hometown club Real Unión, where he played alongside his two brothers, Manuel and Valentin, who also went on to play in the top flight. In the 1938–39 season, at the end of the Spanish Civil War, he signed for Tenerife, where he quickly stood out from the rest, so in late 1939, Patricio Caicedo, the manager of Espanyol, signed him for 5,000 pesetas, along with fellow Canary Islanders Quique and Bernardino Semán, with the arduous negotiations with the Tenerife boardp being carried out directly by the club's president, Genaro de la Riva.

In his first season at the club, Jorge played a crucial role in helping Espanyol win the 1939–40 Campionat de Catalunya, the last-ever edition of the Catalan championships, and then the 1940 Copa del Generalísimo, scoring two goals 3–2 win over Real Madrid. The following season, he helped Espanyol reach the Cup final again, which ended in a 3–1 loss to Valencia. In his latter years at the club, Jorge moved to the midfield, where he formed a partnership with Antonio Fàbregas, a duo that became known as the "Pirates of Manigua". Together with Fàbregas, Rosendo Hernández, and Félix Llimós, he was a member of the Espanyol team that reached the 1947 Copa del Rey final, which ended in a 2–0 loss to Real Madrid.

Jorge stayed at Espanyol for 8 years, from 1939 until 1947, scoring a total of 50 goals in 158 La Liga matches, and having an overall tally of 81 goals in 224 official matches, which makes him the sixth-highest goal scorer in Espanyol's history. In total, he scored three La Liga hat-tricks, including a 4-goal haul in a 7–0 win over Deportivo de La Coruña on 19 March 1944. After leaving Espnayol, Jorge signed for Segunda División side Badalona, with whom he played for two seasons, from 1947 until his retirement in 1949, aged 33.

Jorge was noted for his creativity and imagination, possessing a refined technique, a powerful and accurate shot, and an even stronger personality. The Pericosonline website has described him as "a player with tremendous technique, with formidable running, an excellent finish, and possessed of great footballing wisdom", eventually earning the nickname "the Tenerife baton".

=== International career ===
On 12 January 1941, the 24-year-old Jorge made his international debut for Spain in a friendly match against Portugal in Lisbon, which ended in a 2–2 draw.

As an Espanyol player, Jorge was eligible to play for Catalonia, making three appearances in the early 1940s. For instance, on 6 July 1941, he started in a friendly against a Stuttgart selection at the Adolf Hitler camp in Stuttgart, helping his side to a 2–1 win. On 3 September 1944, he started for Espanyol against Catalonia in a tribute match to Crisant Bosch held at the Sarrià, scoring a goal to help his side to a 2–1 win.

== Later life and death ==
In 1993, Espanyol took advantage of their first-ever visit to Tenerife to award him the club's gold badge. In October 2009, Jorge received an award from Ángel María Villar, the president of the Spanish Football Federation, during an international reunion held at La Ciudad del Fútbol. In March 2010, he was the subject of a tribute from Daniel Sánchez Llibre and Joan Josep Bertomeu.

Jorge died in Santa Cruz de Tenerife on 28 November 2014, at the age of 98. At the time of his death, he was not only the oldest player in Espanyol's history, but also the oldest living international player.

== Honours ==
RCD Espanyol

- Copa del Rey:
  - Champions (1): 1940
  - Runner-up: 1941 and 1947
- Campionat de Catalunya:
  - Champions (2): 1936–37 and 1939–40

== See also ==
- List of La Liga hat-tricks
