= Curta (footballer) =

Spanish footballer

Personal information
- Full name: Josep Puig Puig
- Date of birth: February 22, 1922
- Place of birth: Sant Martí de Llémena, Girona, Spain
- Date of death: July 9, 1997 (aged 75)
- Place of death: Salt, Spain
- Position: Defender

Senior career*
Years	Team	Apps	(Gls)
1939–1942	Girona FC	?	(?)
1942–1951	FC Barcelona	178	(1)

International career
1947–1948	Spain	3	(0)
- * Club domestic league appearances and goals

Josep Puig Puig (22 February 1922 – 9 July 1997), known as Curta, was a Spanish football player who played as a defender. Although he came from Girona FC, the bulk of his career was spent at FC Barcelona. He also played for the national football team of Spain.

== Career ==
Curta spent two seasons at Girona FC (1939–40 and 1940–41) until he was signed by Barça in 1942. On his debut on 27 September 1942, on the first day of the 1942–1943 season, Barcelona lost 3–0 away to Real Madrid.

He spent 9 years in the starting line-up at Barcelona. He played as a defender and won three league titles, playing 178 league games and scoring once.

Curta made his international debut on 26 January 1947 in a 4–1 away friendly defeat to Portugal. He earned two more caps, both in friendlies, scoring an own goal in the latter, a 3–3 draw away to Switzerland on 20 June 1948.

== Honours ==
Barcelona

- La Liga (3): 1944–45, 1947–48, 1948–49

== See also ==
- List of FC Barcelona players
