= Isidro Rovira =

Spanish footballer (1916–1987)

Personal information
- Full name: Isidro Rovira Tuset
- Date of birth: 15 July 1916
- Place of birth: Granollers, Spain
- Date of death: 20 July 1987 (aged 71)
- Position: Midfielder

Senior career*
Years	Team	Apps	(Gls)
1934–1936	Granollers		
1939–1942	Español	59	(0)
1942–1943	Real Madrid	12	(0)
1943–1945	Español	22	(1)
1945–1948	Mallorca	58	(1)
1948–1949	Levante	5	(0)

International career
1941	Spain	2	(0)
- * Club domestic league appearances and goals

Isidro Rovira Tuset (15 July 1916 – 20 July 1987), known as Rovira, was a Spanish footballer who played as a midfielder for Real Madrid. He made two appearances for the Spain national team.

== Honours ==
Español

- Copa del Rey: 1940
