= Máximo Aylagas =

Spanish footballer (1916–1993)

Personal information
- Full name: Máximo Aylagas Herrera
- Date of birth: 15 December 1916
- Place of birth: Osma, Spain
- Date of death: 28 February 1993 (aged 76)
- Place of death: Barcelona, Spain
- Position: Forward

Youth career
- Sant Andreu

Senior career*
Years	Team	Apps	(Gls)
1936–1937	Sant Andreu		
1937	Gràcia FC		
1939–1940	Granollers		
1939–1943	Barcelona		
1941–1942	→ Atlético Zaragoza (on loan)		
1943–1947	Gimnàstic de Tarragona		
1947–1951	Sant Andreu		
1951–1952	Guíxols		
1952–1953	Vic		
1953	Barcelona (veterans)		
- * Club domestic league appearances and goals

Máximo Aylagas Herrera (15 December 1916 – 28 February 1993) was a Spanish footballer who played as a forward for Barcelona in the early 1940s.

== Career ==
=== Early career ===
Born on a farm near Osma in the province of Soria on 15 December 1916, Aylagas was only six months old when his family moved to the Sant Andreu neighborhood of Barcelona, where he began his career in the youth ranks of UE Sant Andreu. He played with the first team in the 1936–37 season, but his career was then interrupted by the outbreak of the Spanish Civil War.

=== FC Barcelona ===
After a brief stint at Gràcia FC, Aylagas joined Granollers in 1939, with whom he played 13 Segunda División matches. Before the end of the season, in March 1940, he was signed by Barcelona, making his debut with the first team in a friendly match against his former club Sant Andreu on 5 May, and making his official debut in the first round of the 1940 Copa del Generalísimo against Atlético Baleares, scoring a brace in both legs to help his side to a 9–2 aggregate win. Despite staying at Barça for three years, until 1943, the 1940 Cup was the last time he played an official match for the club, being restricted only to friendlies, and even loaned to Atlético Zaragoza in the 1941–42 season. In doing so, he became the first Soria native to play for Barcelona.

=== Later career ===
In 1943, Aylagas joined Gimnàstic de Tarragona, with whom he played for four years, until 1947, helping his side not reach the semifinals of the 1947 Copa del Generalísimo, scoring twice in the first leg in an eventual 5–4 aggregate loss to Espanyol, and achieve a runner-up finish in the 1946–47 Segunda División, thus achieving promotion to the top flight for the first time in the club's history, a feat that was only repeated in 2006. Having failed to make a La Liga appearance for Barça, he also failed to do so with Gimnàstic, as he then returned to Sant Andreu, then in the Tercera División, with whom he played for four years, until 1951.

Aylagas then played one season each at Guíxols (1951–52) and Vic (1952–53). Shortly before his 36th birthday in December 1952, he stated in an interview that he had "never played as comfortably as he did now among the kids". After hanging up his boots, Aylagas returned to Barça, but this time he joined its veterans' team, scoring two goals against Badalona in June 1953. The following year, in 1954, he played a few matches with the veterans' team of Gimnàstic.

== Later life and death ==
After retiring, Aylagas began working at the City Council of Barcelona, where he died on 28 February 1993, at the age of 76. He had three sons, with one of them becoming a professional.
