= Francisco Garcerán =

Spanish footballer and manager

Personal information
- Full name: Francisco Garcerán Hernández
- Date of birth: 28 August 1913
- Place of birth: Cartagena, Spain
- Date of death: 12 November 2007 (aged 94)
- Place of death: Cartagena, Spain
- Position: Defender

Senior career*
Years	Team	Apps	(Gls)
1931–1932	Imperial de Múrcia		
1932–1936	Real Murcia		
1939–1940	Barcelona	18	(0)
1940–1946	Cartagena		

Managerial career
- 1943–1944: Cartagena
- * Club domestic league appearances and goals

Francisco Garcerán Hernández (28 August 1913 – 12 November 2007) was a Spanish footballer who played as a defender for Real Murcia and Barcelona in the early 1930s.

== Playing career ==
Born on 28 August 1913 in the Region of Murcia town of Cartagena, Garcerán began his football career in his hometown club Imperial de Múrcia in the early 1930s, before joining Real Murcia in 1932, aged 19, with whom he played for four years, until 1936, when the Spanish Civil War broke out. By the time the conflict ended in 1939, he was serving as a member of the Republic's fleet.

Later that year, he joined Barcelona, remaining there for just a single season, in which he played a total of 24 matches, including 18 matches in La Liga.

After leaving Barça in 1940, Garcerán joined Cartagena FC, with whom he played for six years, until 1946, when he retired, at the age of 33. During the 1943–44 season, he briefly acted as the club's manager. He also worked as a referee after retiring.

== Death ==
Garcerán married Dolores Piqueras Muñoz, with whom he had one daughter, Rosa María Garcerán Piqueras. He died in Cartagena on 13 November 2007, at the age of 94.
