= José Gonzalvo =

Spanish footballer (1920–1978)

Gonzalvo II
Personal information
- Full name: José Gonzalvo Falcón
- Date of birth: 16 January 1920
- Place of birth: Mollet del Vallès, Spain
- Date of death: 31 May 1978 (aged 58)
- Place of death: Barcelona, Spain
- Height: 1.72 m (5 ft 8 in)
- Positions: Defender; midfielder

Senior career*
| Years | Team | Apps | (Gls) |
| 1941–1943 | Ceuta | | |
| 1943–1944 | Sabadell | 25 | (0) |
| 1944–1950 | Barcelona | 144 | (2) |
| 1950–1953 | Zaragoza | 65 | (0) |
| Total | | 234 | (2) |

International career
| 1942–1950 | Catalonia | 5 | (1) |
| 1948–1950 | Spain | 8 | (0) |

Managerial career
- 1963: Barcelona
- * Club domestic league appearances and goals

José Gonzalvo Falcón (16 January 1920 – 31 May 1978), sometimes referred to as Gonzalvo II or – especially as of late – by the Catalan rendition of his given name Josep Gonzalvo, was a Catalan footballer and manager from Spain. Until 1977, it was legally prohibited in Spain to register given names in Catalan, as only Spanish (Castilian) names were permitted under Francoist and early post-Franco civil registry laws. Gonzalvo played for, among others, FC Barcelona, Spain and the Catalan XI.

After retiring as a player, he became a coach and briefly managed Barcelona. He died in 1978 after an unsuccessful operation.

== Club career ==
Born in Mollet del Vallès, Barcelona, Catalonia, Gonzalvo played for Segunda División team SD Ceuta while doing his military service. He then joined CE Sabadell FC, playing alongside his older brother Juli. He made his La Liga debut with CD Sabadell on 26 September 1943 in a 5–2 defeat to Sevilla CF. After just one season he signed for FC Barcelona. During six seasons with the club he played 198 games and scored 5 goals games in all competitions. Together with a team that included, among others Antoni Ramallets, Velasco, Josep Escolà, Joan Segarra, Estanislao Basora, César, Ladislao Kubala and his younger brother, Marià, he helped Barcelona win three La Liga titles. He finished his playing career with one season at Real Zaragoza.

== International career ==
Between 1948 and 1950 Gonzalvo also played 8 times for Spain. He made his debut for Spain in a 2–1 win against Ireland on 5 May 1948 and, together with Marià, went on to represent them at the 1950 World Cup. Between 1942 and 1950 he also played five times for the Catalan XI. His first game was 6–2 defeat against CF Barcelona on 5 July 1942 at Les Corts.

== Managerial career ==
In January 1963, Josep Gonzalvo II replaced Ladislao Kubala as manager of FC Barcelona, overseeing only 15 La Liga matches. During his brief spell, he led a squad featuring Joan Segarra, Jesús Garay, Chus Pereda, Sándor Kocsis, and Ferran Olivella to victory in the 1963 Copa del Generalísimo, beating Real Zaragoza 3–1 in the final at Camp Nou.

== Personal life ==
His two brothers were also notable footballers. Juli Gonzalvo, known as Gonzalvo I, played as a forward for RCD Espanyol before later appearing for FC Barcelona. Marià Gonzalvo, known as Gonzalvo III, was a midfielder for Barcelona and earned 16 caps for Spain.

His two sons, Josep Maria Gonzalvo and Jordi Gonzalvo, also pursued careers in football management. Josep Maria managed FC Barcelona's C and B teams among others, while Jordi went on to coach various lower-division clubs and became a pundit for Catalan television.

== Honours ==
=== Player ===
Barcelona

- La Liga: 1945, 1948, 1949
- Latin Cup: 1949
- Supercopa de España: 1945, 1949

=== Manager ===
Barcelona

- Copa del Generalísimo: 1963
