= Mariano Gonzalvo =

Spanish footballer

Gonzalvo III
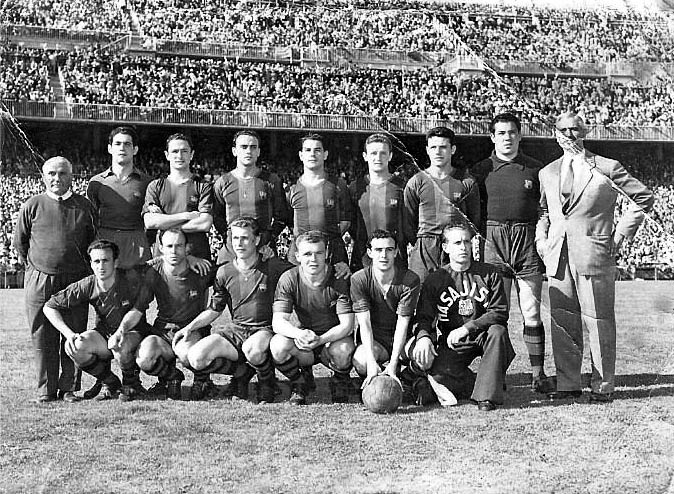

Personal information
- Full name: Mariano Gonzalvo Falcón
- Date of birth: 22 March 1922
- Place of birth: Mollet del Vallès, Spain-
- Date of death: 7 April 2007 (aged 85)
- Place of death: Barcelona, Spain
- Height: 1.69 m (5 ft 7 in)
- Position: Midfielder

Youth career
- Mollet

Senior career*
Years	Team	Apps	(Gls)
- Europa
1940–1941	Barcelona		
1941–1942	Zaragoza		
1942–1955	Barcelona	208	(26)
1955–1956	Lleida	13	(2)
1956–1957	Condal	16	(1)

International career
1947–1955	Catalan XI	3	(0)
1946–1954	Spain	16	(1)
- * Club domestic league appearances and goals

Mariano Gonzalvo Falcón (22 March 1922 – 7 April 2007), also referred to as Gonzalvo III or – especially as of late – by the Catalan rendition of his given name, Marià Gonzalvo, was a Spanish footballer who spent most of his career at FC Barcelona. Gonzalvo was regarded as one of the most talented midfielders in La Liga during the 1940s and early 1950s. On 7 December 1962 Barcelona played a testimonial game against C.A. Peñarol in his honour. He also played for both Spain and the Catalan XI. His two older brothers were also notable footballers. Juli Gonzalvo, known as Gonzalvo I played for RCD Espanyol while José Gonzalvo, known as Gonzalvo II, also played for CF Barcelona and Spain.

== Career ==
=== Club career ===
Born in Mollet del Vallès, Barcelona, Catalonia, Gonzalvo began his career a youth with his local team in Mollet, before joining CE Europa. He then signed for FC Barcelona but initially was unable to establish himself in the first team. He spent the 1941–42 season at Real Zaragoza, playing alongside his brother Juli, and helped them gain promotion to La Liga after they finished as runners-up in the Segunda División. He returned to FC Barcelona and made his Primera División debut on 13 December 1942 in a 4–2 away defeat against Sevilla FC. Over the next thirteen seasons he was a prominent member of a very successful Barcelona team, playing 331 games and scoring 56 goals in all competitions.

Together with a team that included, among others Antoni Ramallets, Velasco, Josep Escolà, Joan Segarra, Estanislao Basora, César, Ladislao Kubala and his brother, José, he assisted with Barcelona's five consecutive La Liga titles and the Copa del Generalísimo three consecutive times. In the 1951 Copa final he scored the third goal in 3–0 win over Real Sociedad. Gonzalvo finished his career playing one season each at UE Lleida and CD Condal. The latter team were originally the reserve team of FC Barcelona but then was designated its own separate club during the 1950s. After winning promotion from the Segunda División, they briefly played in La Liga and were joined by the veteran Gonzalvo.

=== International career ===
Between 1946 and 1954 Gonzalvo also played 16 times for Spain. He made his debut for Spain in a 1–0 defeat against Ireland on 23 June 1946 and went on to represent them at the 1950 World Cup. Between 1947 and 1955 he also played three times for the Catalan XI. His first game was a 3–1 win against Spain on 10 October 1947. On 26 January 1955 he played alongside Ladislao Kubala, Estanislao Basora and guest player Alfredo Di Stéfano in a game against Bologna at Les Corts.

== Honours ==
FC Barcelona

- Spanish Champions (5): 1945, 1948, 1949, 1952, 1953
- Copa del Generalísimo (3): 1951, 1952, 1953
- Copa Latina: 1949
- Copa de Oro Argentina/Copa Eva Duarte (4): 1945, 1949, 1952, 1953
- Copa Martini Rossi (2): 1952, 1953

Real Zaragoza

- Segunda División runners-up: 1942
