= Josep Maria Gonzalvo =

Spanish football manager (born 1959)

Personal information
- Full name: Josep Maria Gonzalvo Solà
- Date of birth: 3 February 1959 (age 67)
- Place of birth: Barcelona, Spain

Managerial career
- Years: Team
- Almenar
- Balaguer
- Calafell
- Horta
- Santboià
- 1996–1997: Barcelona C
- 1997–2001: Barcelona B
- 2002–2004: Reus
- 2004–2005: Figueres
- 2005: Mataró

Josep Maria Gonzalvo Solà (born 3 February 1959) is a Spanish football manager.

== Football career ==
Born in Barcelona, Catalonia, Gonzalvo began his career with Almenar CF. After being subsequently in charge of CF Balaguer, CF Calafell, UA Horta and FC Santboià, he joined FC Barcelona in 1996, being initially appointed manager of the C-team in Tercera División.

Gonzalvo achieved promotion with the C-side, but the relegation of the reserves impeded their promotion to Segunda División B. In 1997, he was named manager of the latter team, also in the third division.

Gonzalvo achieved promotion to the second division in his first season, but suffered immediate relegation. On 29 October 2002, he was appointed manager of CF Reus Deportiu in the third division, suffering team relegation but achieving immediate promotion.

On 22 June 2004, Gonzalvo was appointed in charge of third division side UE Figueres. On 19 October of the following year, he was named at the helm of CE Mataró in the fourth division.
