= Juli Gonzalvo =

Spanish footballer

Gonzalvo I
Personal information
- Full name: Julio Gonzalvo Falcón
- Date of birth: 11 April 1917
- Place of birth: Gelsa, Spain
- Date of death: 20 July 2003 (aged 86)
- Position: Midfielder

Senior career*
Years	Team	Apps	(Gls)
1939–1941	Espanyol	36	(17)
1941–1943	Zaragoza	15	(3)
1943–1945	Sabadell	37	(14)
1945–1946	Barcelona	2	(0)

International career
1941	Catalan XI	2	(0)
- * Club domestic league appearances and goals

Julio Gonzalvo Falcón (11 April 1917, Gelsa, Zaragoza - 20 July 2003), also referred to as Julio Gonzalvo or Gonzalvo I, was a former Spanish footballer. His two younger brothers were also notable footballers. Josep Gonzalvo, known as Gonzalvo II, and Marià Gonzalvo, known as Gonzalvo III, both played for FC Barcelona and Spain.

Gonzalvo made his La Liga debut with RCD Espanyol on 3 December 1939 in a 1-0 win over FC Barcelona. While at Espanyol he helped them win a Campionat de Catalunya/Copa del Generalísimo double in 1940. In 1941 he joined Real Zaragoza and together with his brother Marià, helped them gain promotion to La Liga in 1942. After two seasons at Real, he joined CE Sabadell FC and during the 1943-44 season he played in the same team as his other brother Josep. He joined his two brothers at FC Barcelona in 1945 but fell out with the coach, Josep Samitier and never played for their first team.

== Honours ==
RCD Espanyol

- Copa del Generalísimo
  - 1940: 1
- Campionat de Catalunya : 1
  - 1939-40: 1

Real Zaragoza

- Segunda División:
  - Runners-up: 1942: 1
