= Passeig de Lluís Companys, Barcelona =

Coordinates: 41.3900°N 2.1820°E

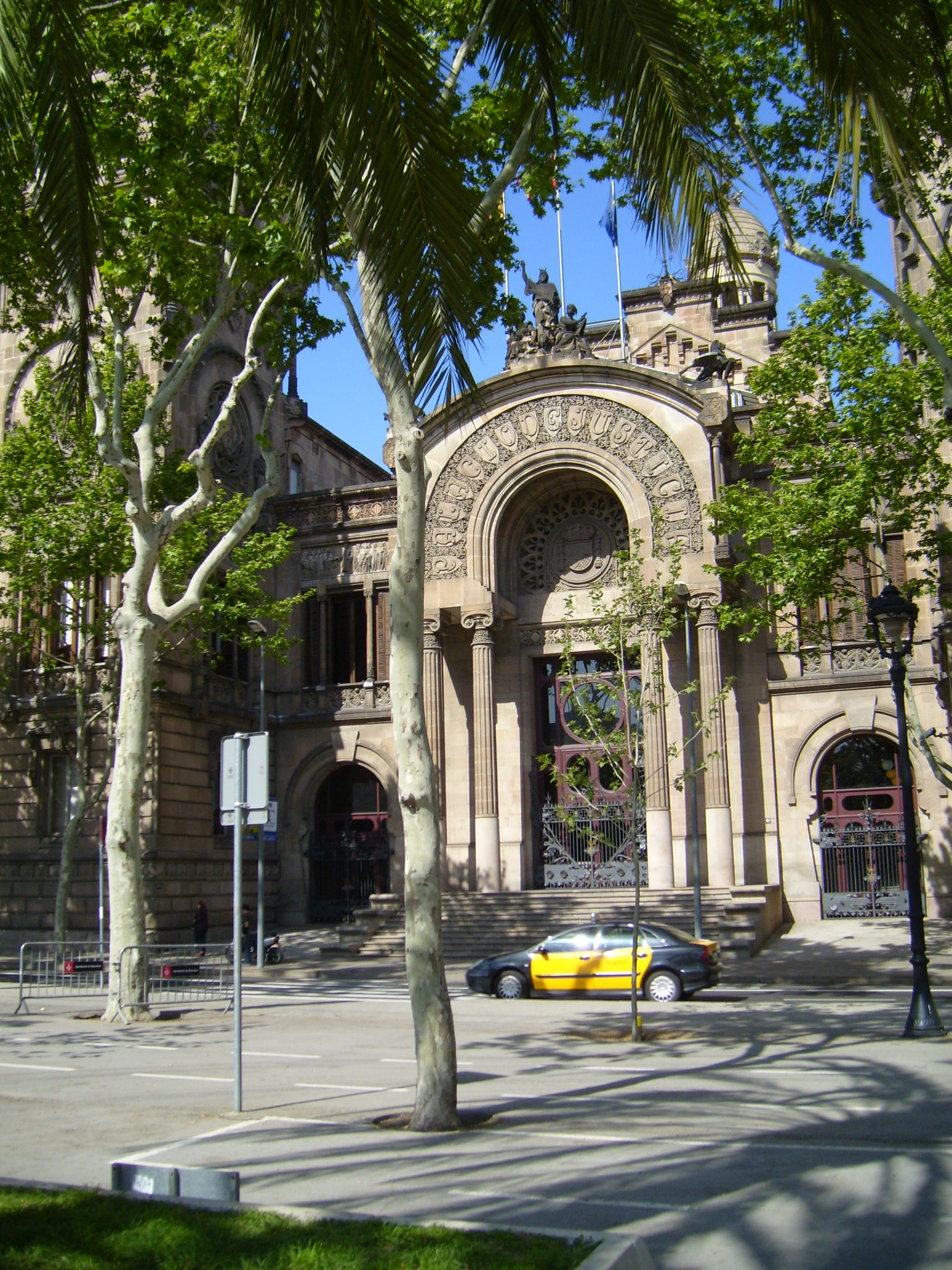
Tribunal Superior de Justícia de Catalunya, on Passeig de Lluís Companys.

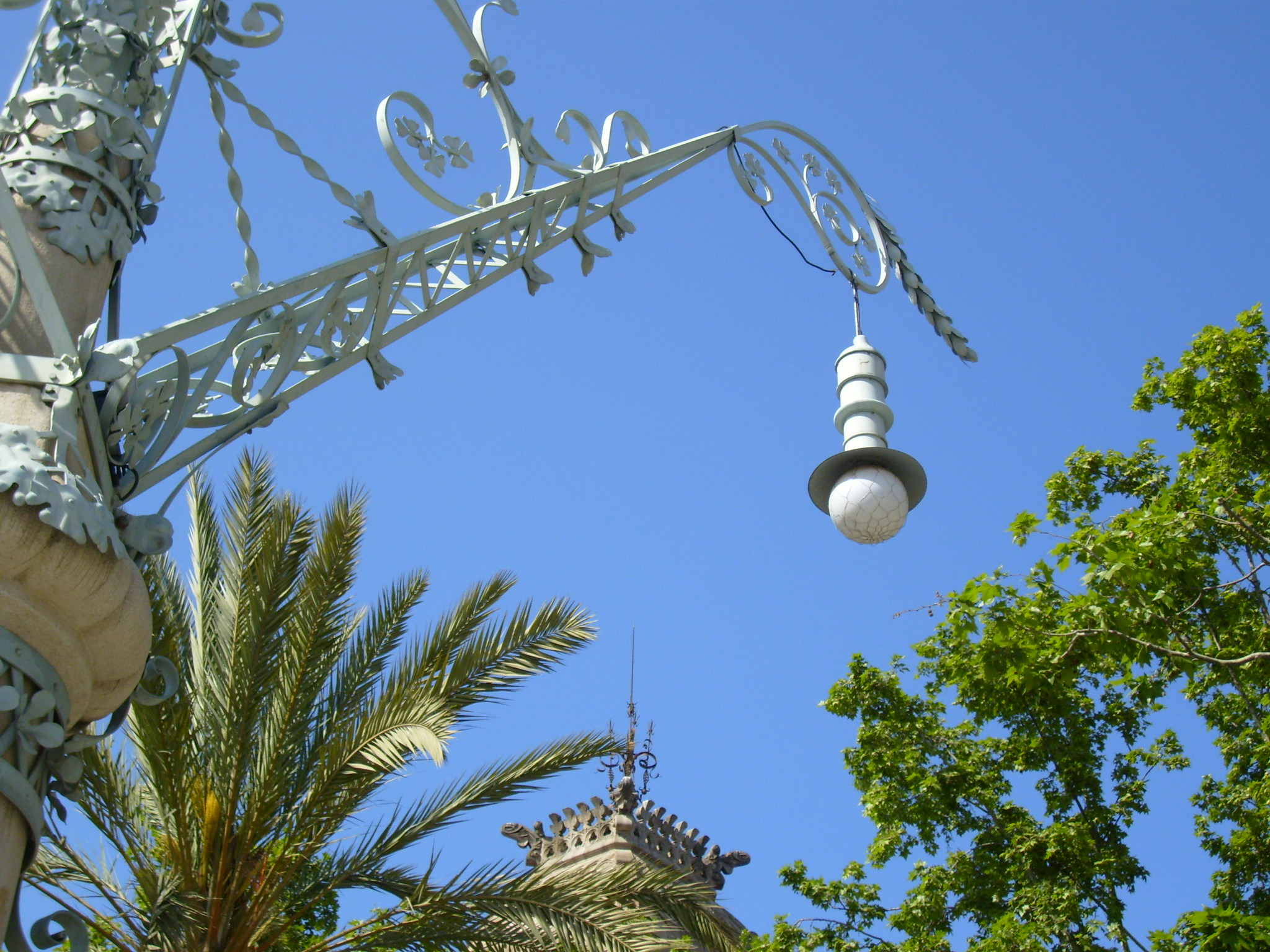
Ornate lamppost on Passeig de Lluís Companys.

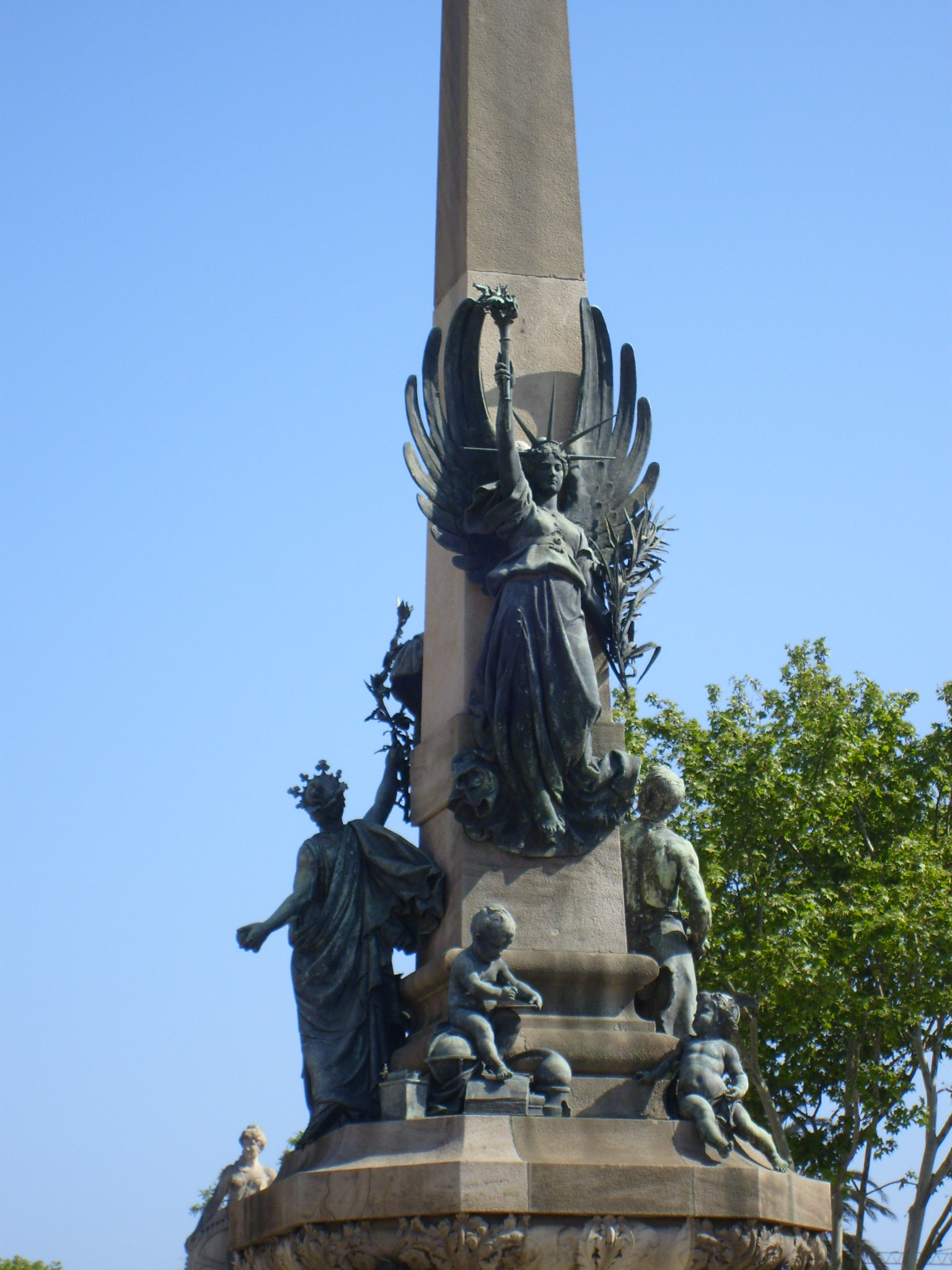
Rius i Taulet monument as seen from behind

Passeig de Lluís Companys (Catalan pronunciation: [pəˈsɛdʒ də ʎuˈis kumˈpaɲs]) is a promenade in the Ciutat Vella and Eixample districts of Barcelona, Catalonia, Spain, and can be seen as an extension of Passeig de Sant Joan. It was named after President Lluís Companys, who was executed in 1940. It starts in Arc de Triomf and ends in Parc de la Ciutadella, on Carrer de Pujades.

== Former names ==
The original Cerdà plan originally listed it as Núm. 35, and was later renamed to Salón de Víctor Pradera, Fermín Galán and Salón de San Juan, or Saló de Sant Joan in Catalan. In 1979 the current name was approved by the city council.

== Buildings and monuments ==
- Arc de Triomf, by Josep Vilaseca i Casanovas
- Tribunal Superior de Justícia de Catalunya, a monumental building in a highly eclectic style, by Enric Sagnier and Josep Domènech Estapà.

=== Personatges del Saló de Sant Joan ===
In 1883, the Barcelona city council approved the inauguration of eight sculptures commemorating eight important men in the history of Catalonia. Originally, these were: Wilfred the Hairy, Roger of Lauria, Bernat Desclot, Rafael Casanova, Ramon Berenguer I, Pere Albert, Antoni Viladomat and Jaume Fabre. They were inaugurated in 1888 for the Barcelona Universal Exposition. Casanova's monument was moved to Ronda Sant Pere in 1917 and replaced by a new one dedicated to Pau Claris, made by Rafael Atché. However, all but the Roger de Llúria and Viladomat statues were removed in 1937, and the Pau Claris monument, concealed in a warehouse for decades, was reinaugurated in 1977.

=== Other sculptures ===
- Lluís Companys monument (1998) by Francisco López Hernández. Has the inscription Catalonia and freedom are the same thing: where freedom lives, there my homeland is. A young girl, Conxita Julià, friend of Companys, poet later on, is the main subject of the sculpture.
- Francesc Rius i Taulet monument (1901) by Manuel Fuxà
- Pere Vila Codina monument (1932) by Josep Dunyach.

== Transport ==
=== Metro ===
- Arc de Triomf (L1)

=== Bus ===
- Line 39 Barceloneta - Horta
- Line 40 Port Vell - Trinitat Vella
- Line 41 Pl. Francesc Macià - Diagonal Mar
- Line 42 Pl. Catalunya - Santa Coloma
- Line 51 Pla de Palau - Ciutat Meridiana
- Line 141 Av. Mistral - Barri del Besòs
- Line B25 Barcelona (Rda. Sant Pere) - Badalona (B. Pomar)

== Gallery ==
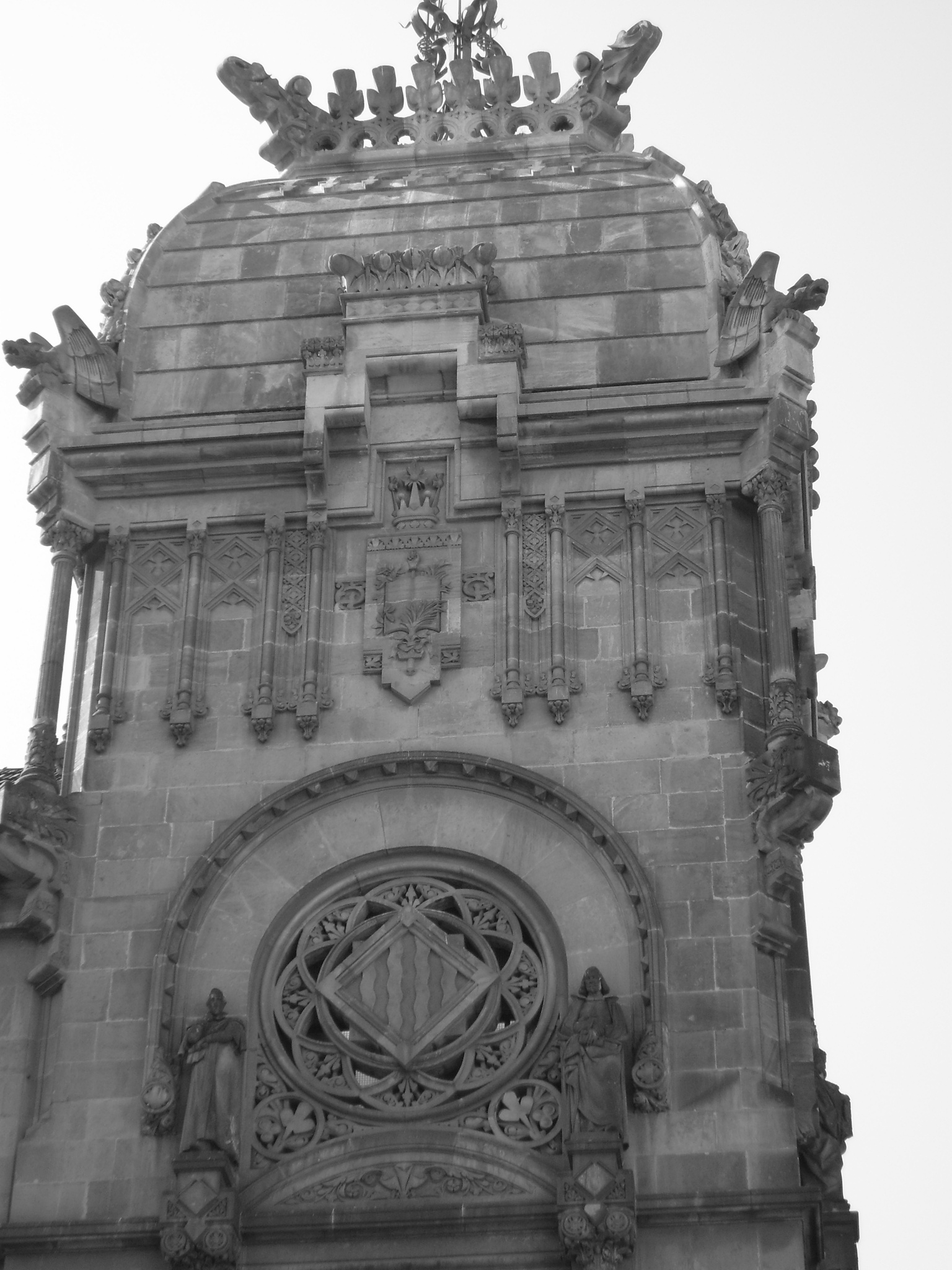
Detail of one of the towers of the Tribunal Superior de Justícia de Catalunya.

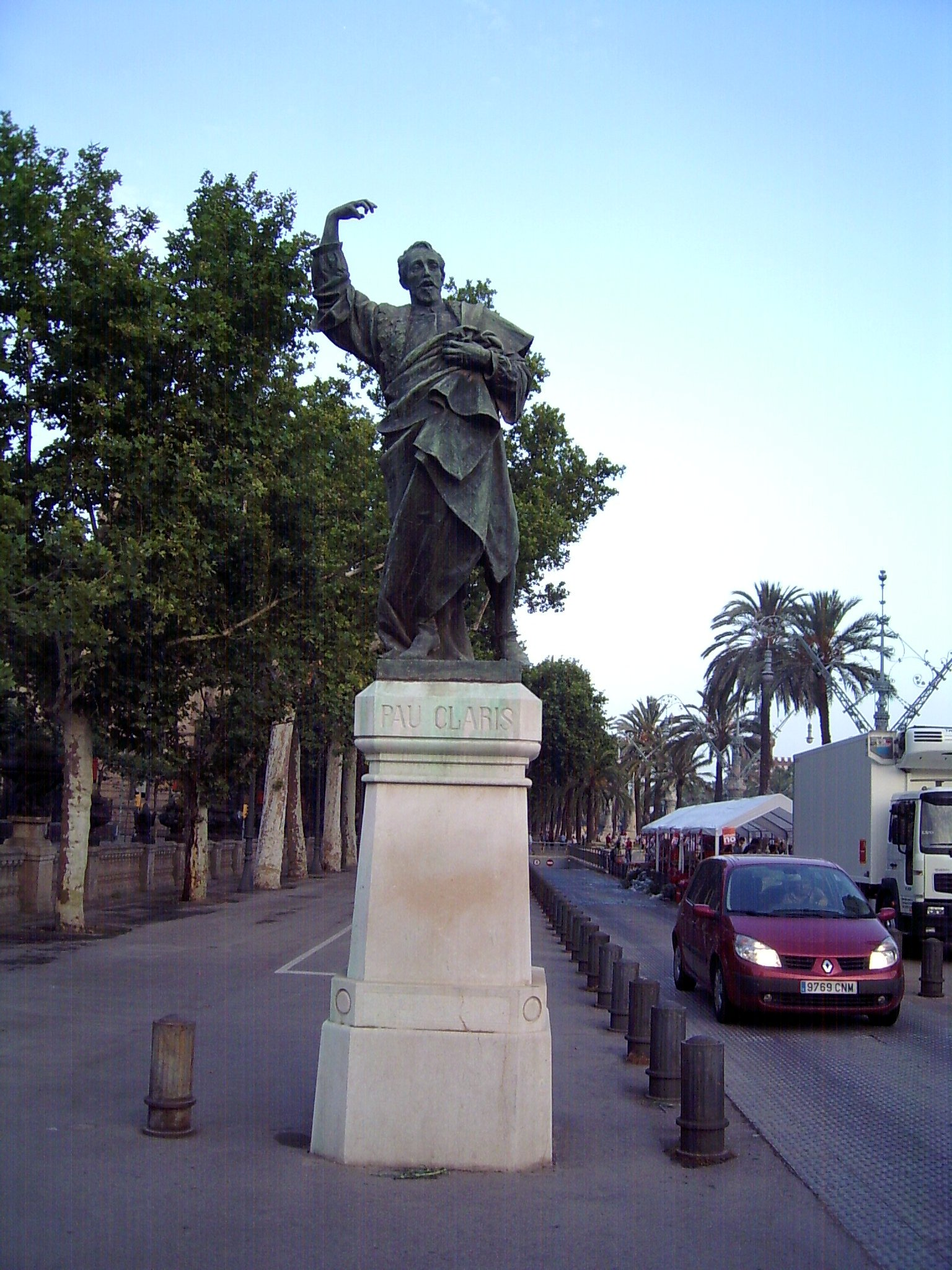
Pau Claris monument.

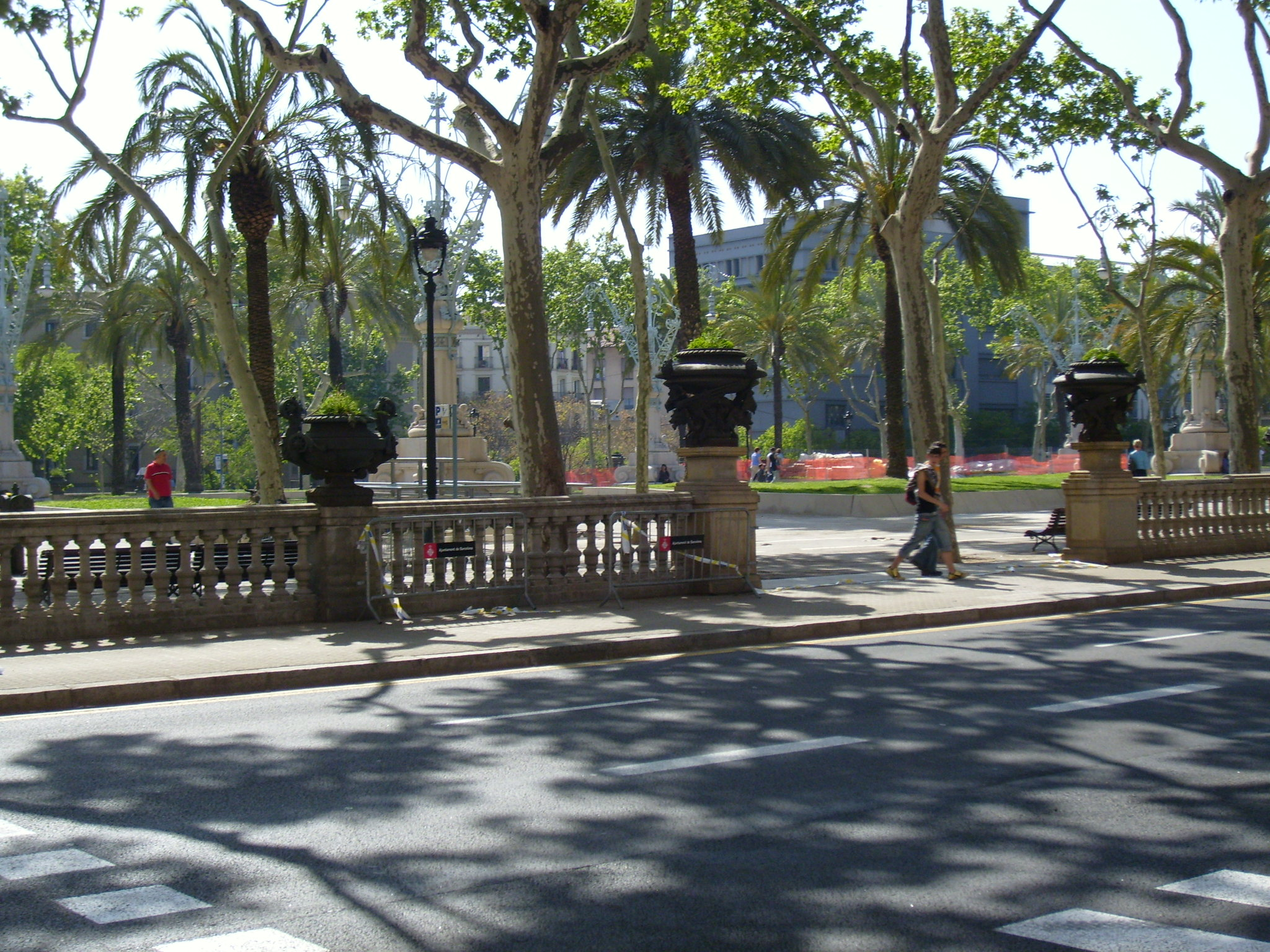
General view.

== See also ==
- Passeig de Sant Joan
- Parc de la Ciutadella
- List of streets and squares in Eixample
- Urban planning of Barcelona
