= Teruel (surname) =

Teruel is a Spanish surname. Notable people with the surname include:

- Alba Teruel Ribes (born 1996), Spanish professional racing cyclist
- Albert Teruel (born 1987), Spanish professional basketball player
- Ángel Teruel (1950–2021), Spanish bullfighter
- Eloy Teruel (born 1982), Spanish cyclist
- Fábio Teruel (born 1971), Brazilian politician
- John Florentine Teruel (1950–2021), Filipino bishop who founded the Apostolic Catholic Church (ACC)
- Juan Gabriel of Teruel, Spanish convert from Islam to Christianity known for translating the Quran into Latin during the early 16th century
- Márcio Teruel (born 1986), Brazilian footballer
- Michael Teruel (born 1970), Filipino-American alpine skier
- Ricardo Teruel (born 1956), Venezuelan composer and pianist.
- Ricardo Teruel (footballer), (1917–1975), Spanish international footballer

== See also ==
- Teruel (disambiguation)
