= Alberto Martorell =

Alberto Martorell may refer to:

- Alberto Martorell (footballer) (1916–2011), Spanish footballer
- Alberto Martorell Lossius (born 1950), Spanish tennis player
