= Vicente Martorell =

Vicente Martorell may refer to:

- Vicente Martorell Portas (1879–1956), Catalan military engineer
- Vicente Martorell Otzet (1903–unkwon), Spanish military engineer, urban planner, and author
