= Josep Reynés =

Spanish sculptor

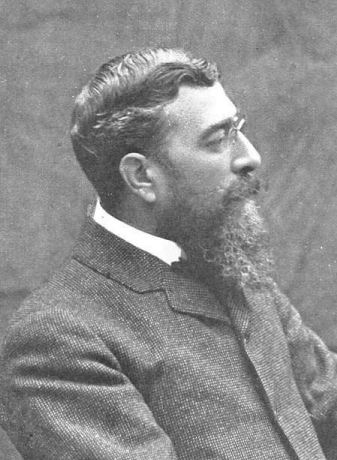
Josep Reynés (1903)

Josep Reynés i Gurguí (1850, Barcelona, Spain - 4 June 1926, Barcelona, Spain) was a Spanish sculptor. He devoted himself primarily to interior decoration, but also created religious and funerary works.

== Life and work ==
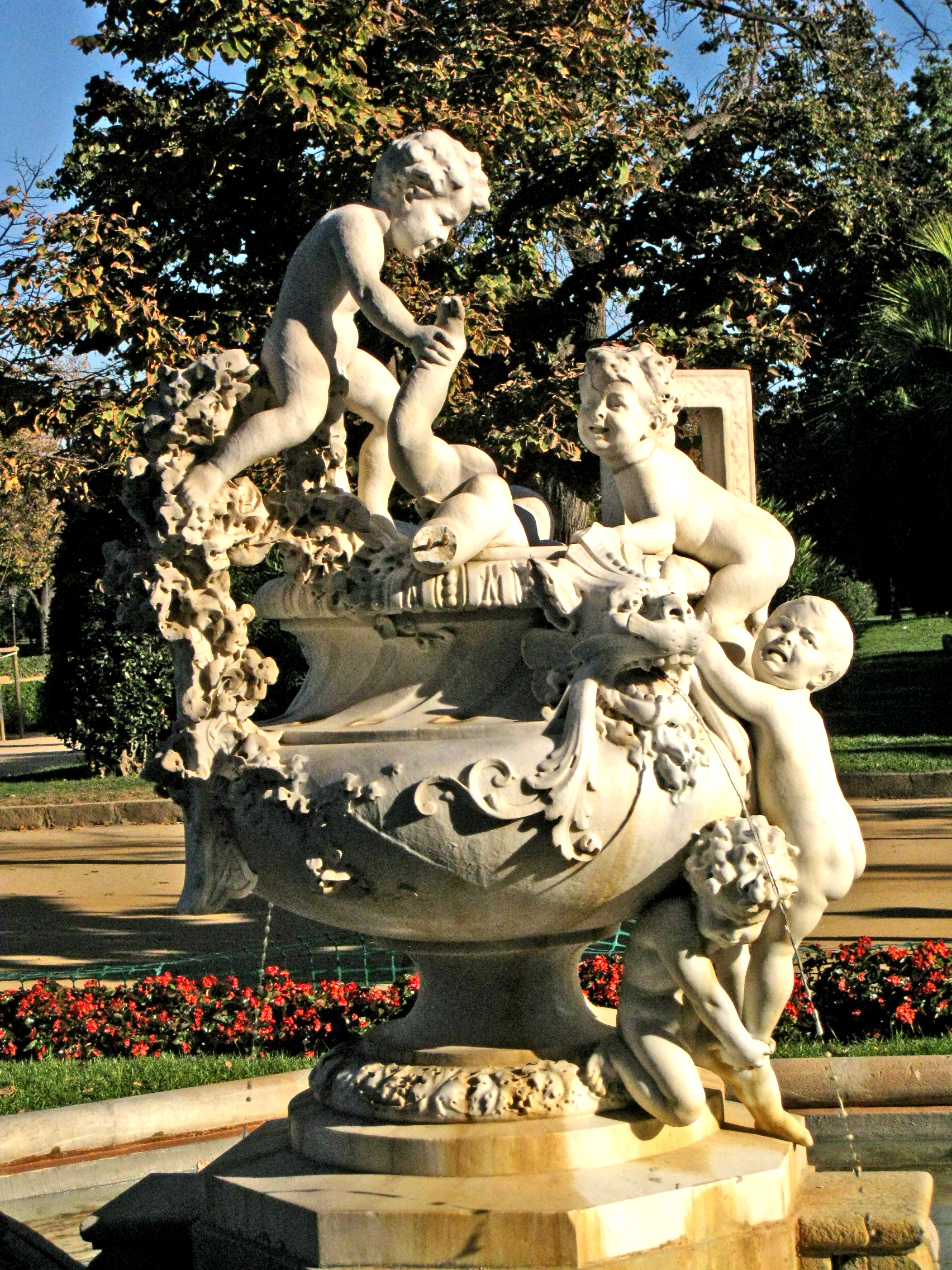
Font dels Nens

His first studies were at the Escola de la Llotja, with the brothers Venanci and Agapit Vallmitjana. He completed them in Paris, from 1873 to 1876, where he worked in the studios of Jean-Baptiste Carpeaux. His first major work came in 1888, when he was part of a group of sculptors who decorated the "Arc de Triomf", the monumental entrance to the Exposición Universal de Barcelona. He was in charge of creating the relief on the main frieze: "Barcelona Welcomes the Nations".

In 1890, he was awarded a first-class medal at the National Exhibition of Fine Arts in Madrid; for his work, La Violinista. One of his most familiar works was created in 1893: the Font dels Nens in the Parc de la Ciutadella. In 1898, he produced a monument to El Greco, in Sitges, designed in the Catalan Modernist style. Later, in 1907, he returned to Sitges to create a monument for Bartomeu Robert, known as "Doctor Robert", who had served as Mayor of Barcelona in 1899.

He created numerous works for the Montjuïc Cemetery; including an allegorical figure of religion at the Salvador Bonaplata Pantheon (1886), figures representing Faith and Hope at the Carles Godó Pantheon (1899), and female sculptures in the neo-Gothic chapel at the Gener-Seycher Pantheon (1902-1906).

In 1915, he created several ornamental busts for the façade of the Palau del Parlament de Catalunya; notably of the artists Manuel Tramulles and Antoni Viladomat.

Some of his works may be seen at the Museu Nacional d'Art de Catalunya. His brother, Antoni (1853-1910), was a landscape and flower painter.

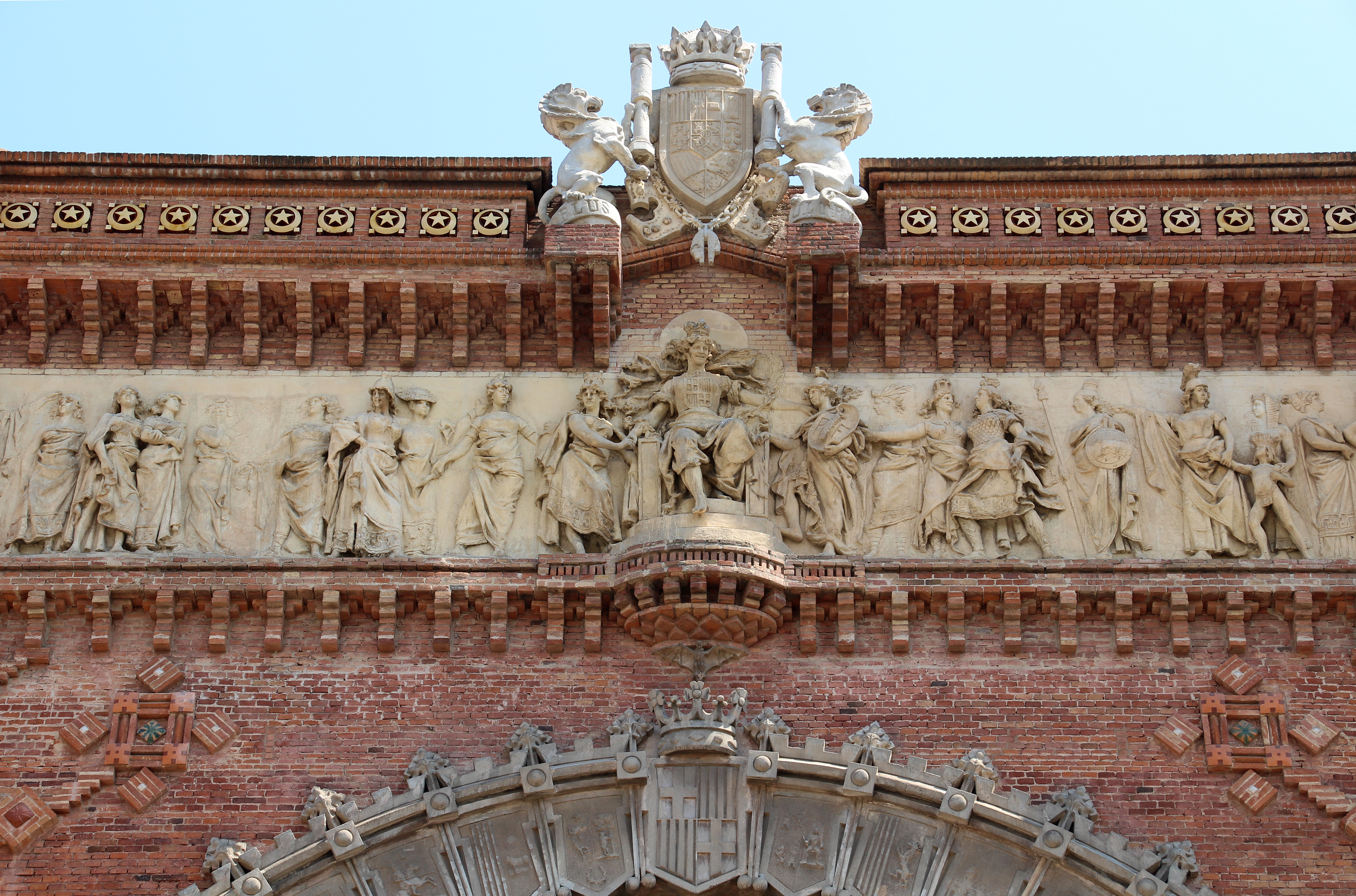
The frieze at the Arc de Triomf
