= Claret School Barcelona =

School in Barcelona, Spain

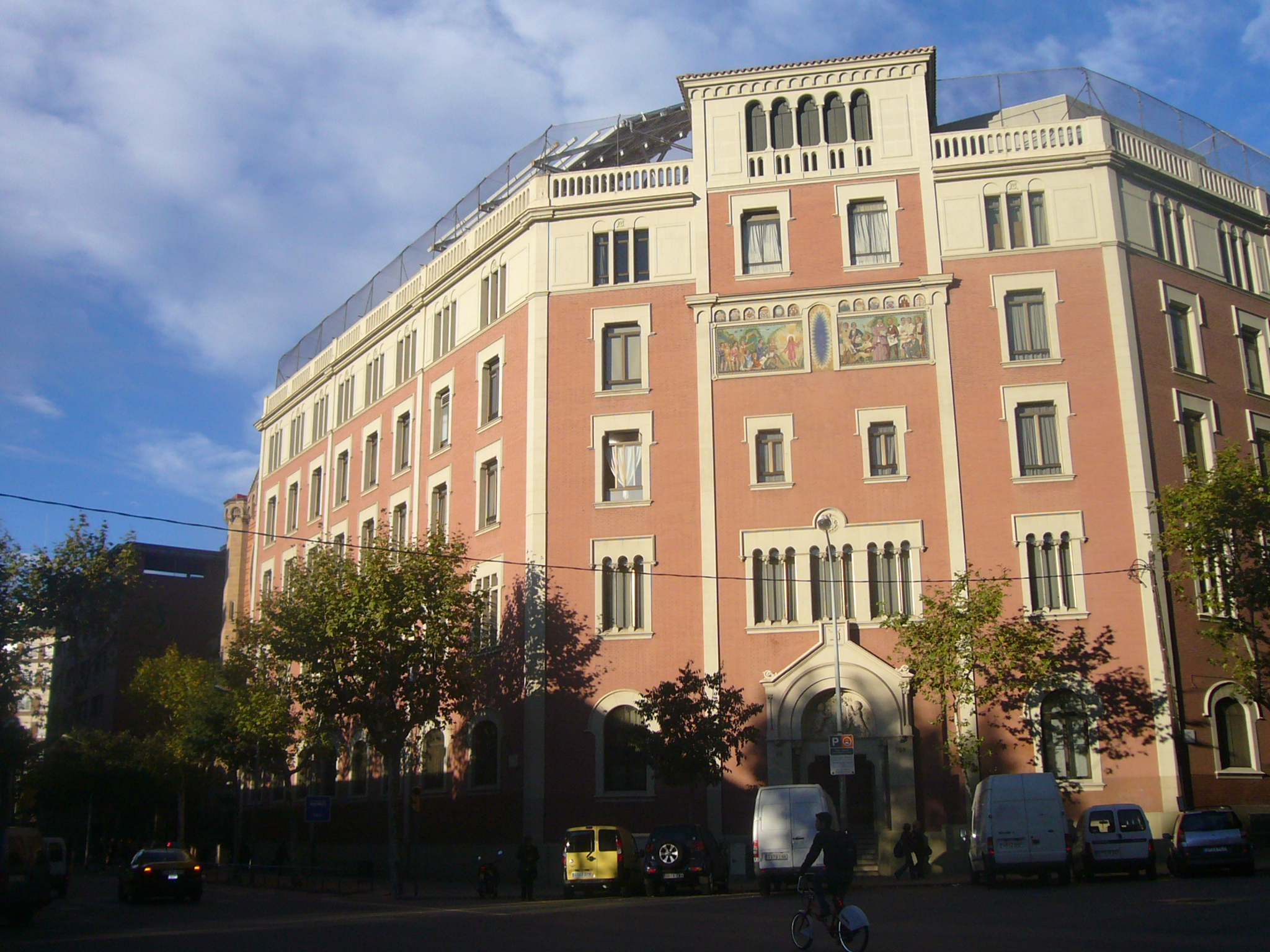

Location
- Coordinates: 41.40611°N 2.16714°E

Information
- Religious affiliation: Claretians
- Established: 1871; 155 years ago
- Head teacher: Vicenç Barceló

Claret School Barcelona is a Claretian school founded in 1871 in Barcelona, more precisely in Camp d'en Grassot and Gràcia Nova neighborhood. It is ruled by the Claretian, an order founded in 1849 by Sant Antoni Maria Claret i Clarà (1807–1870).

== History ==
=== Early history ===
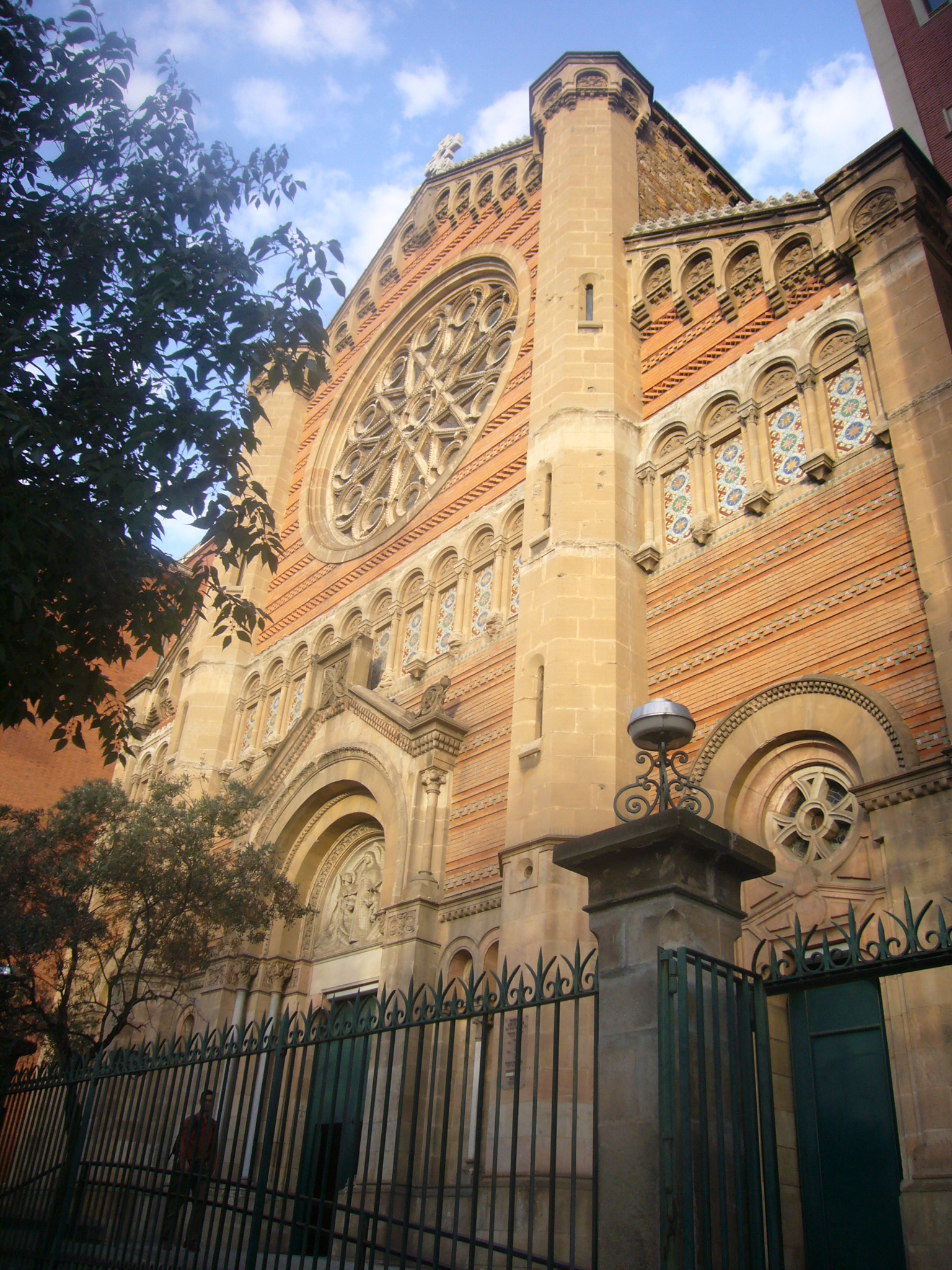
Immaculate Heart of Mary Church

The Claretian community arrived in Barcelona in 1860 when they founded the "New Convent" in a modest building surrounded by fields of cultivation on the suburbs of Gràcia, a village that was integrated into Barcelona in 1897. In 1871, the educational activities began with the foundation of the first Claretian school in Barcelona (then Gracia). At that time, there was only one school for boys in Barcelona, the Escolapis in Raval

This Claretian school, first called Heart of Mary School, was located in the corner of the now Naples and Claret streets, and responded to the educational needs of the children from Gràcia and Sant Martí de Provençals. It was the only building in the area, and that is why it gave its name to the current street of Sant Antoni Maria Claret in Barcelona. In 1904, the current church of the Immaculate Heart of Mary was built, which later became the central part of the building. The school was burned and destroyed during the Tragic Week of 1909 and moved temporarily to Passeig de Sant Joan number 82, until in 1912 it returned to its original place, at Sant Antòni Maria Claret 45-49 (before called Coello street, 255).

=== Civil war and later ===
With the outbreak of the Spanish Civil War in 1936, the church was burned down, and the school was looted, leaving it unusable. The church's façade still has bullet marks which, in order to preserve historical memory, have not been restored. The school opened again in 1940. In 1960, new floors and sports facilities were added, and in 1976, the Sports Centre Claret was inaugurated. In 1997, the old Claret-Naples streets building was demolished (built between 1909 and 1912, and by that time very damaged), and a new one was built with new classrooms, parochial premises, the Sports Center Claret and the Claretian community.

=== Today ===
From the beginning in 1871, the school had been run by Claretians. This changed in 2002: the headmaster was not a Claretian or a religious person anymore. The first lay headmaster was Xavier Melgarejo Draper, psychologist and pedagogue, who left the post in 2012. From that moment on, the headmaster has been Vicenç Barceló
