= Margarita de la Villa =

Margarita del Val
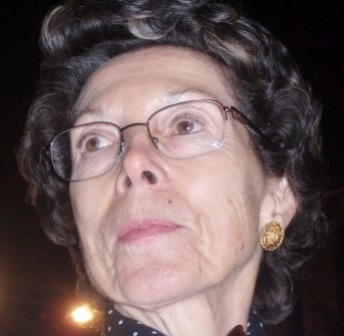
- Born: 1934 (age 91–92); Madrid, Spain

Academic background
- Education: National Autonomous University of Mexico; Complutense University of Madrid

Margarita de la Villa de Llano (22 August 1934) is a Spanish jurist and publisher who served as director of the Spanish subsidiary of the Fondo de Cultura Económica.

== Life and career ==
Daughter of Alejandro de la Villa Gutiérrez —a journalist for La Libertad and a member of Izquierda Republicana— and Rosa Francisca de Llano Arias. In 1939, she went into exile with her parents, living in France, the Dominican Republic, Cuba, and reaching Mexico in 1943. There, she studied at the Luis Vives Institute and later earned a law degree from the National Autonomous University of Mexico (UNAM), specializing in Constitutional Law, Public International Law, and Comparative Law. She received the National Award for the highest grade point average (10 out of 10) of her graduating class (1952–1957) and won the National Legal Thesis Competition in 1957 with her thesis titled "The Legitimacy of the Constitution of February 5, 1857." She has also served as an advisor to the Organization of American States (OAS) on the drafting of the Maritime law for Latin America, and as a legal advisor at Mexico's Undersecretariat of Finance and Public Credit from 1962 to 1964, working under Jesús Rodríguez y Rodríguez.

Upon returning to Spain, she sat for the examinations for the same law degree at the Complutense University of Madrid, obtaining the Spanish qualification in 1973.

From that year on, she dedicated her professional career to providing legal counsel to family businesses and acquaintances on both sides of the Atlantic. She also engaged in translation work and remained active in academia, delivering lectures on various topics and participating in numerous conferences. Additionally, she spent six years in the publishing sector, directing the Spanish subsidiary of the Fondo de Cultura Económica (1995–2001).

== Publications ==
- Legitimidad de la Constitución mexicana de 1857 [Legitimacy of the Mexican Constitution of 1857]. UNAM, Mexico, 1957.
- Bibliografía Sumaria de derecho mexicano [Summary Bibliography of Mexican Law]. Margarita de la Villa and José Luis Zambrano. Institute of Comparative Law. UNAM University Press. Mexico, 1958.
- Constituciones vigentes de la República Mexicana [Current Constitutions of the Mexican Republic]. Two volumes. University Press. UNAM, Mexico, 1962.
- Mexican Papers for the VI International Congress of Comparative Law (Hamburg, 1962).
- Second Ibero-American Meeting on Labor Law (Puebla, Mexico, 1988).
- Testimonios y remembranzas acerca del Instituto de Investigaciones Jurídicas [Testimonies and Reminiscences Regarding the Institute for Legal Research]. UNAM, Mexico, 2015.
- Talento y exilio: la diáspora del conocimiento [Talent and Exile: The Diaspora of Knowledge], Punto Rojo Libros, 2021.
