= Conxita Julià =

Catalan poet (1920–2019)

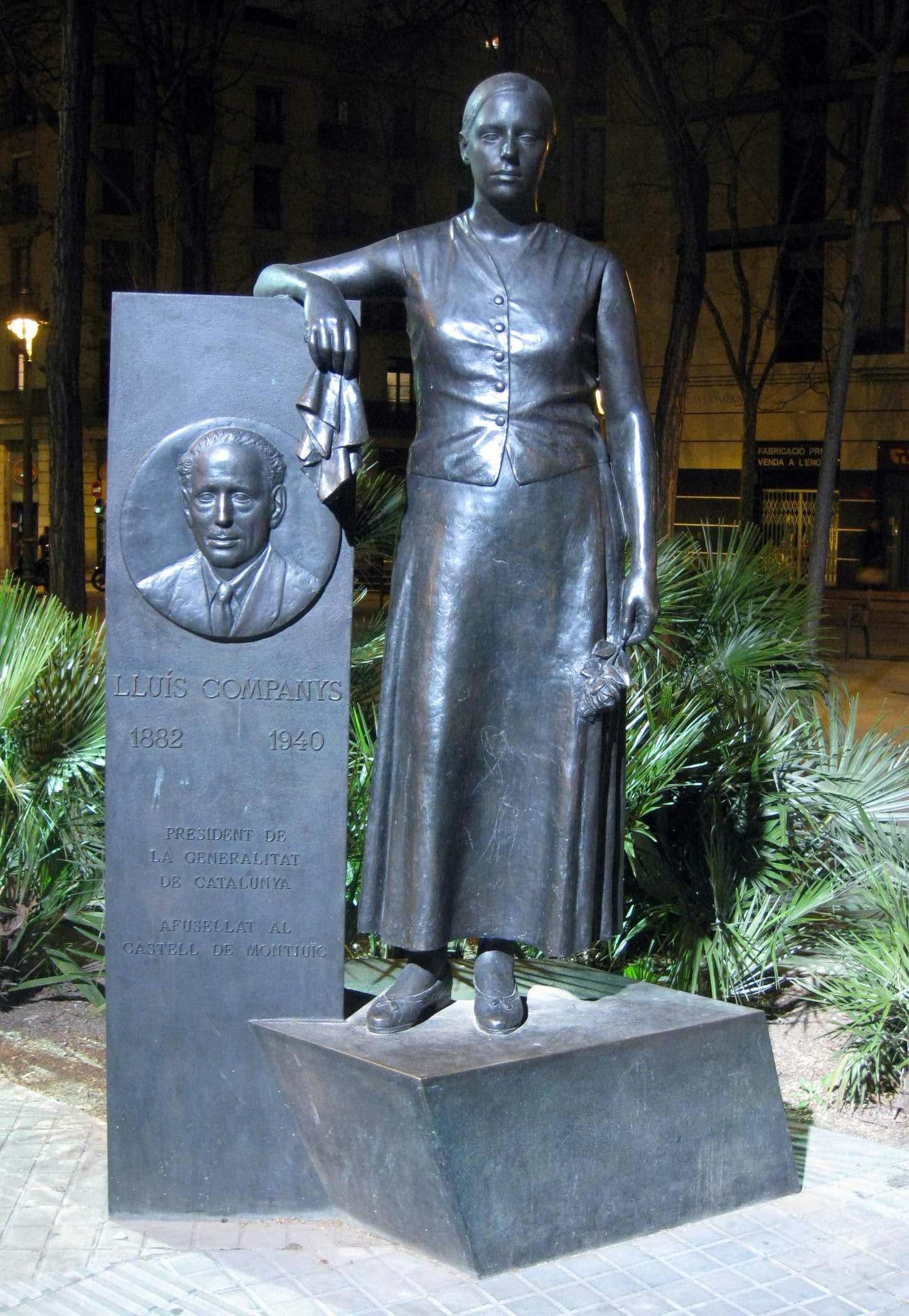
Monument to Julià and Companys in Barcelona

Conxita Julià i Farrés (Catalan pronunciation: [kuɲˈʃitə ʒuliˈaj fəˈres]; 11 June 1920 – 9 January 2019), also known as Conxita de Carrasco, was a Catalan woman noted for her dealings with Lluís Companys, President of Catalonia, in the 1930s, and for her poetry. Julià died in January 2019 at the age of 98.

== The Companys handkerchief ==
In 1934, Lluís Companys, with the rest of the Catalan government, was imprisoned for his role in the political rebellion known as the "events of October the 6th". Initially they were held on the prison ship Uruguai in Barcelona, which the fourteen-year-old Conxita visited with her father to show their support. They were later moved to a prison in Cádiz in southern Spain. Conxita wrote to Companys in Cádiz, sending him a supportive poem called "Al meu aire". He replied to her, and they exchanged several more letters, hers in verse, during his imprisonment. In 1936, following his release by the new left-wing Spanish government, he returned to Barcelona and his old job as president of the Catalan autonomous government.

On 14 April that year Companys attended a ceremony at the grave of Francesc Macià in Montjuïc cemetery, where Conxita approached him and identified herself. Companys embraced her warmly, and when she asked him for a memento, he presented her with the white silk handkerchief from the breast pocket of his jacket, which was one of his famous symbols, exhorting her to "guard it, and love Catalonia". She brought the handkerchief home, and had a neighbour embroider it with the Catalan coat of arms and wording explaining the handkerchief's origin.

Later in 1936, the Spanish Civil War broke out, which resulted in a victory for the Nationalists in 1939. Conxita's parents decided to burn everything the family had which might incriminate them, including Conxita's letters from Companys, who had now fled into exile. However, she managed to hide the handkerchief inside the lining of her coat, and carried it around with her from then on. In the following years, Conxita got married and started having children, still living in the Poblenou district of Barcelona, where she grew up. One day she received a warning that she was being monitored by local agents of the repressive authorities, so in fear of being found in its possession she sent the handkerchief away to Catalan acquaintances in Caracas in Venezuela, for safekeeping in the Catalan Centre in that city.

Following the end of Francoist Spain and the Spanish transition to democracy, she started making enquiries about getting the handkerchief back, and with the assistance of politicians Josep Benet i Morell and Marc Aureli Vila secured its return and presented it to the Catalan government in 1993. The handkerchief is now stored in the Catalonia History Museum in Barcelona.

== Monument ==
In April 1998, a memorial bronze-and-stone sculpture called A Lluís Companys ("to Lluís Companys") was unveiled in Barcelona, at the junction of Ronda de Sant Pere and Passeig de Sant Joan, near the Arc de Triomf. It was created by Spanish sculptor Francisco López Hernández. Although it is named for Companys and the inscription only mentions Companys, its main feature is a two-metre-high figure of Conxita Julià at about 20 years old (her age at the time of Companys's execution), holding a handkerchief and a rose and leaning on a memorial plaque to Companys. On 15 October each year, the anniversary of Companys's execution, a floral tribute is laid at this monument, with Julià in attendance prior to her death.

== Poetry and other activities ==
Poetry by Julià was published throughout her life in various magazines and anthologies, such as Tramuntane (Perpignan), and performances, such as at the Lleida Comarcal Centre (in Barcelona). She was also a keen hillwalker.

== Published works ==
- Silenci Sonor: Antología Poètica de Conxita Julià i Farrés (2004). ISBN 978-84-932897-4-4
- Records de la meva infància: les passejades amb el pare (2007). Published by Barcelona City Council. Google Books
