= Joaquín Aznar =

Spanish footballer (1909–1968)

Personal information
- Full name: Joaquín Aznar Belmonte
- Date of birth: 5 July 1909
- Place of birth: Barcelona, Spain
- Date of death: 6 October 1968 (aged 59)
- Place of death: Barcelona, Spain
- Position: Goalkeeper

Youth career
- Espanyol

Senior career*
Years	Team	Apps	(Gls)
1927–1929	Gràcia FC		
1929–1934	Espanyol		

International career
1931	Catalonia	2	(0)
- * Club domestic league appearances and goals

Joaquín Aznar Belmonte (5 July 1909 – 6 October 1968) was a Spanish footballer who played as a foalkeeper for Espanyol in the early 1930s.

== Career ==
Born on 5 July 1909 in the Catalonian town of Barcelona, Aznar began his football career in the youth ranks of Espanyol, which at the time was coached by Pasabalón. In 1927, he joined Gràcia FC, where he quickly established himself as a starter. Two years later, in 1929, Aznar returned to Espanyol, where he established himself as the club's second-choice goalkeeper behind the legendary Ricardo Zamora. Despite this, he was still able to make 36 official appearances for the club between 1929 and 1932, conceding a total of 73 goals, including 18 La Liga matches. In 1932, he moved to the reserve team, where he stayed for two years, until 1934, when he retired following after sustaining a fractured collarbone in a collision with a Martinenc forward.

Like so many other players from Espanyol, Aznar was eligible to play for the Catalan national team, making his debut on 6 June 1931 against CE Europa at Camp del Guinardó, in a tribute match to Antonio Alcázar, helping his side to a 3–2 win. Two months later, on 9 August, he earned his second cap for Catalonia in a tribute match to Sants player Jesús Pedret, helping Catalonia to a 5–2 win over Sants.

== Later life ==
After retiring from football in 1934, Aznar dedicated himself to table tennis, first as a player and then as a coach at clubs such as Club de 7 a 9 and CT Barcino.

== Death ==
Aznar died in Barcelona on 6 October 1968, at the age of 59.
