= Alberto Martorell (footballer) =

Spanish footballer and medic (1916–2011)

Personal information
- Full name: Alberto Martorell Otzet
- Birth name: Albert Martorell i Otzet
- Date of birth: 13 March 1916
- Place of birth: Madrid, Spain
- Date of death: 22 November 2011 (aged 95)
- Place of death: Barcelona, Catalonia, Spain
- Position: Goalkeeper

Youth career
- 1922–1924: Peña Montserrat
- 1924–1933: Peña Saprissa

Senior career*
Years	Team	Apps	(Gls)
1930–1932	Espanyol C		
1932–1945	Espanyol	122	(0)

International career
1935–1944	Catalonia	7	(0)
1941–1942	Spain	4	(0)
President of the Spanish Society of Angiology
Incumbent
Assumed office
1959
President of Club Tennis Barcino
In office
1971–1977
- * Club domestic league appearances and goals

Alberto Martorell Otzet (13 March 1916 – 22 November 2011) was a Spanish medic, author, and footballer who played as a goalkeeper for Espanyol in the 1930s. He also played seven matches for the Catalan national team, and four matches for the Spanish national team in the early 1940s.

A historical member of Espanyol, he spent his entire career there, thus being part of the so-called one-club men group. He is considered one of the best goalkeepers in the club's history and in Catalan football. Outside football, he played a crucial role in the beginnings of Angiology, being the driving force of that specialty for over 40 years.

== Early life and education ==
Alberto Martorell was born in Madrid on 13 March 1916, as the son of two Barcelona natives, including his father Vicente Martorell, a military engineer who was stationed in the Spanish capital, but upon the insistence of his wife, Emilia Otzet, the family returned to their hometown when Alberto was two years old. He had three older brothers, Ramón, Vicente, and Fernando, with the eldest two following in their father's footsteps, becoming military engineers, while Fernando followed medicine.

Martorell began playing football with his brother Vicente and later with his friends on his way home from the Iberian School on Lauria Street, doing so often on Passeig de Sant Joan, around the Monumento a Mosén Jacint Verdaguer. He soon joined the youth ranks of Peña Montserrat, where he began to play with 10-year-olds at the age of 7, not because he was a youth prodigy, but because he had football boots, unlike most of his friends.

Peña Montserrat eventually began to play its matches near the football pitch of Europa, where Martorell, until then a forward, began to play as a goalkeeper for the first time, making his debut under the sticks only because Montserrat's goalkeeper walked off the pitch in protest after having a heated argument with the referee concerning a supposedly unfair penalty; despite being the youngest member of the team, Martorell was the chosen outfield player to stand in goal, and although he failed to save the penalty, his teammates highlighted the way he dived and his potential as a goalkeeper, a position he held ever since.

== Club career ==
=== Early career ===
In 1924, the 8-year-old Martorell was recruited by Pasabalón, the head of Peña Saprissa, Espanyol's youth academy, who had heard of him through a former teammate. Martorell joined the Peña Saprissa squad as a striker, where he did well, but he was even better as a goalkeeper, soon establishing himself as such. He rose through the club's ranks meteorically, joining Espanyol's third team in 1930, aged 14, and becoming a substitute for the first team in 1932, aged 16. He then made his official debut for Espanyol in a Catalan championship against Granollers at the Sarrià on 29 October 1933, aged only 17, earning this opportunity from the hands of coach Ramón Trabal only because there was nothing at stake, as Barcelona had already claimed the title; Martorell kept a clean-sheet in a 3–0 victory. Three weeks later, on 18 November, he made his La Liga debut, also at Sarrià, against Racing de Santander, keeping another clean-sheet in a 5–0 victory.

In his first season at Espanyol's first team, Martorell alternated with Francisco Florenza, playing in nine of the 18 La Liga matches, including a 3–2 victory in the Derbi Barceloní at the Sarrià on 13 January 1934. In the following year, on 1 January 1935, he started for Espanyol against the Catalan national team in a tribute match to Josep Pausàs, which ended in a 3–3 draw. In March 1936, just three months before the outbreak of the Spanish Civil War, Espanyol rewarded his services with a 10-horsepower Ford vehicle, then worth approximately 9,500 pesetas; however, the club had paid only the first installment out of the 12 who were in his name, which angered him, so the club's president, Genaro de la Riva, offered him 1,000 pesetas for the car, but Martorell refused. When the Civil War broke out, Martorell saved the vehicle from seizure by taking it to Ford, which returned it to him once the conflict ended.

=== Civil War ===
For Martorell, football was just a hobby, not a profession, with his true passion being medicine, so he combined football with his medical studies, which were interrupted by the outbreak of the Civil War, so he had to receive his professional and scientific training under the guidance of his brother Fernando, who was an assistant professor of Surgical Pathology at the Hospital Clínic de Barcelona, where Alberto began working as a medical intern, taking advantage of the Civil War to assist as a cardiologist in the non-stop emergency rooms. Following a 3–4 away loss to Valencia CF in the Mediterranean League on 2 May 1937, the Espanyol squad returned to its headquarters to find Barcelona amidst the May Days, during which Martorell worked tirelessly to save lives. He was a member of the Espanyol team that participated in the 1937 Copa de la España Libre, starting in every match except for the two trips to Valencia, being replaced by Pedro Ruiz, which proved crucial for Espanyol's faillure to reach the final.

Due to his youth, he was forced to go to the front with the Leva del biberón, but he returned unharmed. When the War ended in 1939, he was accused of betraying the Francoist cause by not going over to the Francoist side following the 1937 "Popular Olympiad" held in Antwerp, but he was saved from being shot or sent to prison by Espanyol's leaders, General Moscardó and president Genaro de la Riva, whose niece Maite Oliveras de la Riva had married Martorell's brother Fernando. Nonetheless, the Delegación Nacional de Deportes suspended him from playing for a year, which prevented him from participating in Espanyol's triumphant campaign at the 1940 Copa del Generalísimo, being replaced by José Trías. During this period, he kept playing for Espanyol, but clandestinely, featuring as a left winger in the club's second team, under his given name, Alberto, scoring several goals.

=== Later career ===
Following the end of his ban in the middle of the 1940–41 season, Martorell was finally able to make his return on 19 January 1941 in a league fixture against Athletic Bilbao at the San Mamés, which ended in a 6–2 loss. In the following years, Martorell helped a struggling Espanyol to survive relegation, stopping several attacks from Sporting de Gijón in a promotion play-off on 18 April 1943 in an eventual 2–1 victory. Due to his clear ability as a striker in the club's training sessions, both his teammates and coach Crisant Bosch contemplated using him in that position against Sevilla, but the plan did not come to fruition, with Martorell starting under the sticks in a 2–1 win.

Combining football with his medical studies was becoming increasingly difficult, not only because of time, but also because he received some patients in his office who had previously insulted him from the stands. He thus announced his intention to leave football to the club's board, which pressured him into staying for one more season because Trias was making his mandatory military service in Cartagena. The president Paco Román even tried to bribe him with a car, but Martorell was quick to declined because of what had happened last time. In his last season at the club, he suffered from a lack of motivation as the matches felt long, but he still helped his side reach the semifinals of the 1944–45 Copa del Generalísimo, which ended in a 1–4 loss on aggregate to Athletic Bilbao. Aware of his eminent farewell, he received standing ovations in the second leg at the San Mamés, was interviewed live by Bilbao's local radio station, and at the end of the match, Athletic gave him a cigarette case.

He remained loyal to the club for over a decade, from 1933 until 1945, conceding a total of 348 goals in 201 official matches, including 122 La Liga matches. He played a crucial role in the Espanyol team that won the Catalan championship in 1936–37 and reached the 1941 Copa del Generalísimo final, which ended in a 3–1 loss to Valencia. He was noted for his composure and impeccable clearances, being considered one of the best goalkeepers in the club's history and in Catalan football, as well as a worthy successor to Ricardo Zamora, who had left the club in 1930.

== International career ==
Like so many other Espanyol players, Martorell was eligible to play for the Catalonia national team, making seven appearances between 1935 and 1944. For instance, on 6 July 1941, he started in a friendly match against a Stuttgart selection at the Adolf Hitler camp in Stuttgart, helping his side to a 2–1 win. In the following year, on 5 July 1942, he started in another friendly, this time against Barcelona, which was celebrating its triumph in the 1942 Copa del Rey; they drew at 1. In March and April 1944, he started in two friendlies against the Valencian national team, with the latter ending in a 2–2 draw.

On 28 December 1941, the 25-year-old Martorell made his international debut for Spain, starting in a friendly against Switzerland at the Mestalla, conceding one goal before being subbed off by Juan Acuña in the 74th minute in an eventual 3–2 win. A few months later, on 15 March 1942, he earned his second cap in a friendly against France, keeping a clean-sheet in a 4–0 victory, although he never had anything to stop but timid shots. In the following month, in the midst of the Second World War, Spain went to Hitler's Germany and Mussolini's Italy to play a friendly against both national teams, and even though the latter ended in a 0–4 loss, Martorell was considered to be Spain's best player by all the national newspapers. Nonetheless, he never again wore the Spanish jersey, partly because Spain went almost three years without playing another match.

== Other sports ==
During his 1939 suspension, Martorell played with the SEU at the Camp Municipal de Rugby La Foixarda, where he met his future wife, Mari Paz Lossius. As football was just a hobby, he never strove to get paid by Espanyol, except for 1942, when he demanded from the club the minimum salary as an international goalkeeper, which was 1,000 pesetas per month, especially because he had just married María Paz in July 1942, with whom he had two children, Alberto and Mari Paz. This is also why he rejected lucrative offers from both Barcelona and Real Madrid, with the former offering him a blank check, while the latter offered him 380,000 pesetas, but Espanyol deceived Martorell by informing that the offer was 40,000 pesetas.

After his career as a player ended, Martorell remained linked to Espanyol, now as a member of its board of directors, where he served for only one year in 1945–46, although he later served as a director under José Fusté, from 1963 to 1966. On 22 December 1946, he was the subject of a tribute match at the Sarrià, which pitted Espanyol and Gimnàstic de Tarragona (2–0), where he received various gifts, such as a book signed by players from other Spanish teams, before taking the honorary kick-off. After leaving Espanyol's board in 1966, he stopped attending football matches because he hated the new playing style, which focused more on defending than on scoring. In addition to football, he also played field hockey, rugby union, table tennis, tennis, becoming a member of Club Tennis Barcino in 1955, with whom he won several veteran tennis championships in Catalonia and Spain (1974, 1976, 1979, 1981 and 1982), and where he later served as a delegate for both its hockey section and for its junior tennis section, eventually becoming its president in 1971, a position that he held for six years, until 1977. On 14 November 1999, the 83-year-old Martorell attended the inauguration of Espanyol's Centenary event, where he raised the Espanyol flag at the Estadio Olímpico, with the help of former teammates Julián Arcas and José Trias.

Martorell later published two books, the first in 1945, called Veinte años de fútbol me enseñaron que... ("Twenty years of football taught me that..."), which is not an autobiographical book, but rather an educational one about football and its environment, dedicating the last two chapters to share a total of 13 anecdotes that he had experienced, while his second book was published in 1968, called Mi carnet de deportista ("My sports card"). He received the gold badges of both the Catalan Tennis Federation and the CT Barcino, which named him honorary president in 1977, as well as the silver medal for sporting merit from the Consejo Superior de Deportes in 1978, at the suggestion of the Royal Spanish Tennis Federation.

== Medical career ==
Martorell combined football with his medical studies until he finished his degree and earned the qualification to practice medicine in 1946, after which he retired from football to dedicate himself to medicine, where he became his brother Fernando's closest collaborator in creating the specialty of Angiology, which deals with cardiovascular surgery. To promote and study its widespread use, the Martorells convened Spanish angiology workshops and conferences, founded a journal called Angiología, whose first issue was published in January 1949, and even formed a scientific society in Barcelona on 7 July 1959. Alberto was the sole owner of the aforementioned journal for 44 years, from 1949 until 1993, correcting manuscripts and managing its several sections, such as "Information", "Book Reviews", and "Gallery of Illustrious Angiologists". Both of his children went on to follow in his footsteps as angiologist-vascular surgeons.

== Death ==
Martorell died in Barcelona on 22 November 2011, at the age of 95. Two years after his death, on 13 March 2013, Barcino Tennis Club named its number two court after him.

== Honours ==
RCD Espanyol

- Catalan championship:
  - Champions (1): 1936–37
- Copa del Rey:
  - Runner-up (1): 1941
