= La Libertad (Spain) =

Newspaper in Madrid, Spain 1919–1939

- Type: Daily newspaper
- Founded: December 13, 1919
- Ceased publication: March 26, 1939
- Language: Spanish
- City: Madrid
- Country: Spain
- ISSN: 2488-3689

La Libertad was a Spanish progressive newspaper, founded in 1919 by editors of El Liberal as a result of a newspaper strike. Throughout its existence it was configured as a left-wing republican publication. It disappeared in 1939, at the end of the Civil War.

== History ==
In December 1919 an important number of editors and workers of the newspaper El Liberal went on strike, although they would end up abandoning this newspaper. In its place they founded a new publication, La Libertad, which published its first issue on December 13, 1919. In its early years it maintained a position close to the politician Santiago de Alba and the Liberal Left group. After the establishment of Primo de Rivera's dictatorship, it was one of the newspapers that welcomed the new regime most negatively.

In March 1925, the newspaper was acquired by the businessman and financier Juan March, who also took control of the evening newspaper Informaciones. (Note: It was printed in the same building as Informaciones, whose façade faced the streets of la Madera and San Roque (Checa Godoy, 1989, p. 106).) Despite the change of ownership, La Libertad would consolidate in these years as the left-wing newspaper of Juan March —while Informaciones was the right-wing one—. It maintained a position of opposition to the dictatorship and in 1928 it declared itself republican; at the time of the fall of the dictatorship —1930— it was, according to Antonio Checa Godoy, one of the main spokesmen of republicanism in Madrid. The editorial line did not change after the arrival of the Second Republic. March left the newspaper in May 1934, at which point it began a new phase. In 1935 he gave great media coverage to the "estraperlo" affair, exploiting that political scandal.

The newspaper began to defend the politicians of the first biennium and it would extreme its leftist position, especially after the triumph of the Frente Popular in the elections of February 1936. The newspaper continued to be published after the outbreak of the Civil War, in July 1936. It disappeared with the end of the war, at the end of March 1939.

== Trajectory ==
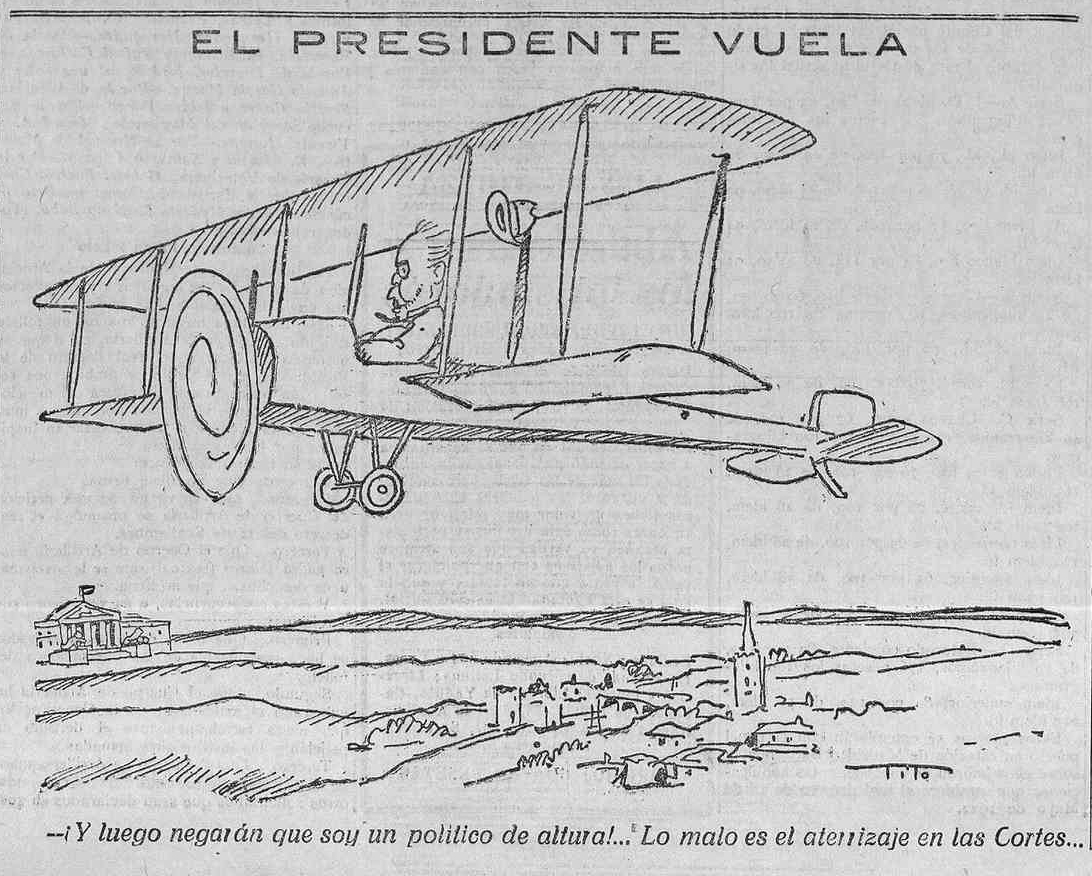
"El presidente vuela" (The president flies), Tito's cartoon, October 18, 1922.

Its success is evidenced by the fact that it published 250,000 copies on the day the sentence was carried out against those convicted of the Andalusian Mail Train Robbery. It published good quality feuilletons (Eckermann, Dickens, Mérimée, Dumas Jr., Goethe, Murger, Verne, Répide, Palacio Valdés, Conan Doyle, etc.) well illustrated first by Carlos Sáenz de Tejada and then by Francisco Rivero Gil, while the caricatures were reserved for Exoristo Salmerón and Ricardo Marín, although the youngest of the Machado brothers, José, also made his dabbling as a cartoonist. J. M. Martínez Bande was in charge of the sports drawings.

There was a serious competition with El Liberal to win the credit of the readers, as well as a lawsuit for plagiarism, accused of copying the sections, the layout, the distribution of the pages and trying to take advantage of the distribution channels. Nevertheless, La Libertad scored notable news successes:

- Report on the Moroccan War in eight issues by Oteyza and Alfonso.
- Attention, in 1920, to the possible entry of the PSOE into the III International.

=== Escrache ===
On November 26, 1935, a group of monarchists and right-wingers led by Fernando Cobián, son of the former minister Eduardo Cobián, stood in front of the newspaper's headquarters in the early evening "with the purpose of carrying out an aggression as a protest against an article published by the newspaper in the morning edition".

== Editorial staff ==
Among the founding editors were Antonio Zozaya, Luis de Oteyza (who was one of its directors), Pedro de Répide, Antonio de Lezama, Luis de Zulueta, Augusto Barcia, Manuel Machado and Luis Salado, among others. The journalist Teresa de Escoriaza was also a collaborator.

Antonio de Miguel's list of its editors includes, apart from those mentioned above, Camilo Barcia Trelles, Augusto's brother; Joaquín Aznar, who would become its director; Darío Pérez, Luis de Tapia, Manuel Castro Tiedrá, Arturo Pérez Camarero, José Manuel Fernández Gómez (later condemned to death as editor by the victors of the civil war together with the also editor and poet Félix Paredes Martín and the deputy editor Eduardo Haro Delage), Alfonso R. Kuntz, Antonio de la Villa, his brother Alejandro de la Villa, Ricardo Hernández del Pozo, Rafael Hernández, Antonio García Romero, Ángel Lázaro, Manuel Ortiz de Pinedo, Francisco Rivero Gil, the photographer Alfonso Sánchez García, known simply as "Alfonso", and several others.

== See also ==
- El Liberal

== Bibliography ==
- Cabrera Calvo-Sotelo, Mercedes (2011). Juan March (1880-1962) (in Spanish). Madrid: Marcial Pons. ISBN 9788492820405.
- Checa Godoy, Antonio (1989). Prensa y partidos políticos durante la II República (in Spanish). Universidad de Salamanca. ISBN 84-7481-521-5.
- Esteban, José; Santonja, Gonzalo (1988). Los Novelistas sociales españoles (1928-1936): antología (in Spanish). Anthropos Editorial. ISBN 9788476580929.
- Esteban, José (2000). El Madrid de la República (in Spanish). Silex Ediciones. ISBN 9788477370864.
- Palenque, Marta (2006). "Ni ofelias ni amazonas, sino seres completos: aproximación a Teresa de Escoriaza". Arbor (in Spanish). 182 (719). Arbor, Consejo Superior de Investigaciones Científicas. doi:10.3989/arbor.2006.i719.36. hdl:11441/46556. ISSN 0210-1963.
- Pérez Alcalá, Eugenio (2007). "José Venegas, periodista, su etapa en "El Liberal" de Madrid". Elucidario: Seminario bio-bibliográfico Manuel Caballero Venzalá (in Spanish) (4). Instituto de Estudios Giennenses: 79–92. ISSN 1885-9658.
- Sáiz, María Dolores; Cruz Seoane, María (1996). Historia del periodismo en España (tomo 3) (in Spanish). Alianza. ISBN 9788420681597.
- Tobajas, Marcelino (1984). El periodismo español. Notas para su historia (in Spanish). Ediciones Forja. ISBN 9788492820405.
