= Vicente Martorell Portas =

Spanish military engineer and urban planner (1879–1956)

- Born: Vicenç Martorell i Portas; 1879; Sant Feliu de Guíxols, Catalonia, Spain
- Died: 1956 (aged 76–77); Barcelona, Catalonia, Spain
- Citizenship: Spanish
- Occupations: Military engineer; Urban planner; Author
- Known for: First director of the municipal technical cartographic office of the City Council of Barcelona

Vicente Martorell Portas (1879 – 1956) was a Spanish military engineer, urban planner, and author.

== Career ==
From 1920 until 1924, Martorell served as the director of the Army's Topographical Engineers' Brigade, which drew up a topographic map of Barcelona for a study regarding the city's maritime defence. In October 1923, just a month after the 1923 Spanish coup d'état that established the Dictatorship of Primo de Rivera, the government authorized the Topographical Brigade to facilitate a copy of the city's map to the Assembly of Barcelona, with Primo de Rivera himself, still Captain General of Catalonia, sponsoring the work to incorporate the final portion of the map in order to obtain a fully complete document suitable for diverse uses.

In 1925, Martorell was appointed as the first-ever director of the newly established municipal technical cartographic office of the City Council of Barcelona, being chosen for this role not only because of his solid cartographic training, but also because of his work as a military engineer; for instance, he held managerial positions in railway companies, such as secretary of the Council and Head of Central Services of the ''Compañía de los Caminos de Hierro del Sur de España'', as well as Councilor-secretary of The Granada Railway. He took office along with some of his collaborators in the Topographical Engineers' Brigade, many of whom went on to request supernumerary status, thus becoming part of the City Council's staff.

Their first task was the drawing of urban parcels, taking as a base map the one they had made at Brigade, which had to be enlarged to a higher scale, thus forcing them to calculate the necessary complementary triangulations due to the difference in scale of the two maps. Martorell later said that during this work, which expanded 11 brigades from 1926 to 1930, 7 from 1931 to 1935, and 6 from 1936 to 1940, "71 triangulation vertices were used; 7,610 polygons were followed, with more than 44,000 tachymetric station points; more than 800,000 detail points were taken, and about 8,500 stations or points were leveled". In 1935, he issued a Folding wall map of Barcelona known as Plan de la Ciutat Barcelona.

Once the Spanish Civil War was over, Martorell held the position of chief engineer of the group of technical services for urban planning of the City Council of Barcelona.

== Writing career ==
Martorell co-authored the spatial planning of the CENU in 1937, the collective work Historia del urbanismo en Barcelona in 1970, and also wrote several works on the cartography of Barcelona.

== Personal life ==
Martorell fellow Barcelona native Emilia Otzet, with whom he had at least four sons Ramón, Vicente, Fernando, and Alberto. The older two followed in his footsteps and became military engineers, while the younger two followed medicine and went on to become pioneers in Angiology.

== Death ==
Martorell died in Barcelona in 1956, at the age of either 76 or 77.

== Works ==
- Cartografía local: planos geométricos de Barcelona de mediados del siglo XIX
- Cartografia nacional, regional y local
- Cartologia Local: Plano de Enlaces entre Nucleos de Poblaciones de Barcelona
- Historia del urbanismo en Barcelona: del plan Cerdá al Área Metropolitana
- Ildefonso Cerdá, el hombre y su obra: edición de homenaje del Ayuntamiento de Barcelona, con motivo del centenario del la aprobación del proyecto de ensanche de la ciudad, 1859-1959
- Organización general de los servicios técnicos municipales de ingeniería y arquitectura, en el Ayuntamiento de Barcelona, y especial funcionamiento del Servicio del Plano de la Ciudad
- Plano de la ciudad complemento del dietario guía "Barcino" y que edita la Agrupación Benefico-Humanitaria de la Guardia Urbana de Barcelona
- Plano del casco antiguo de Barcelona
- Proceso urbanístico de Barcelona
