= Josep Vilaseca i Casanovas =

Catalan architect and artist

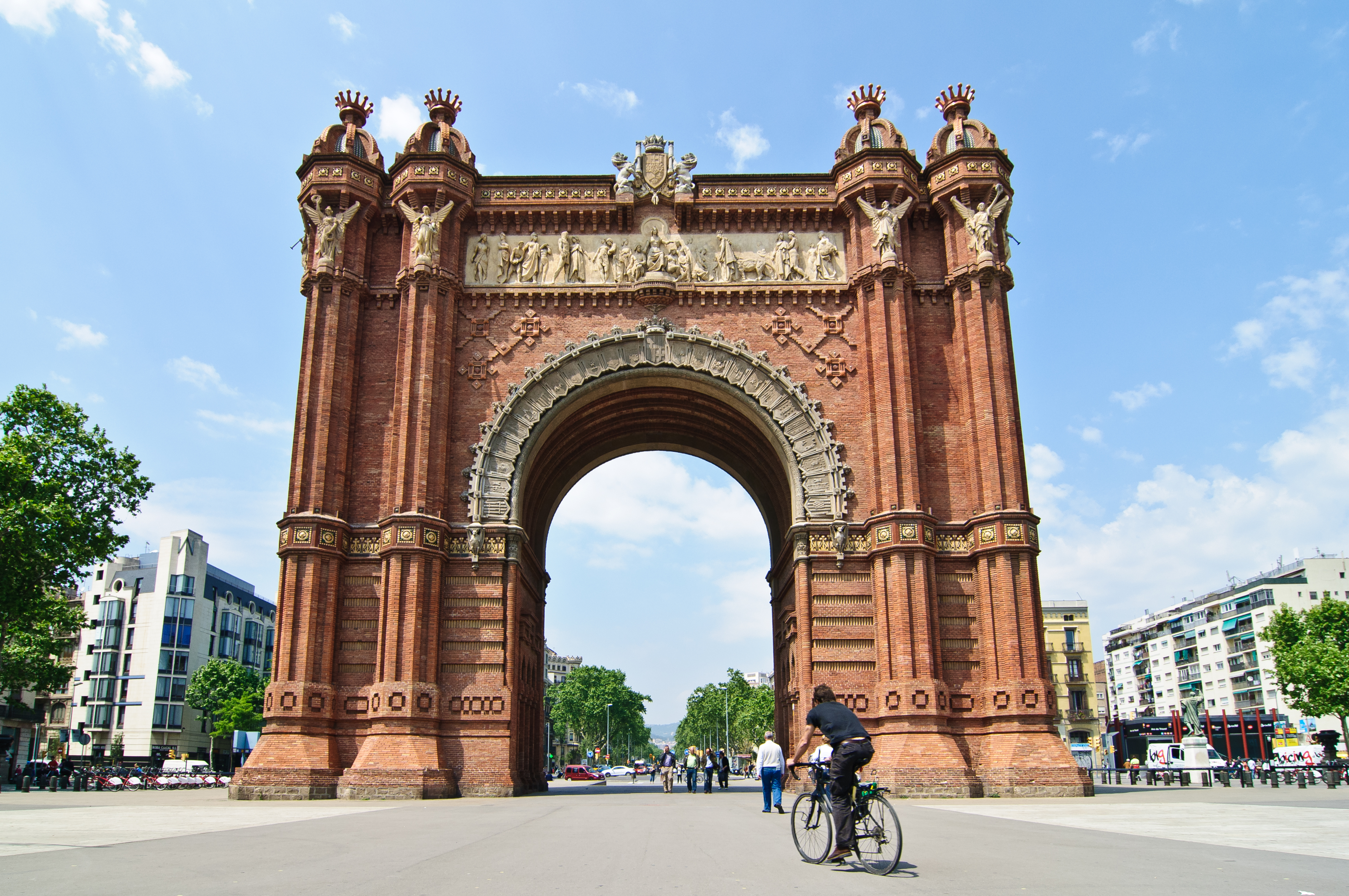
The Arc de Triomf in Barcelona

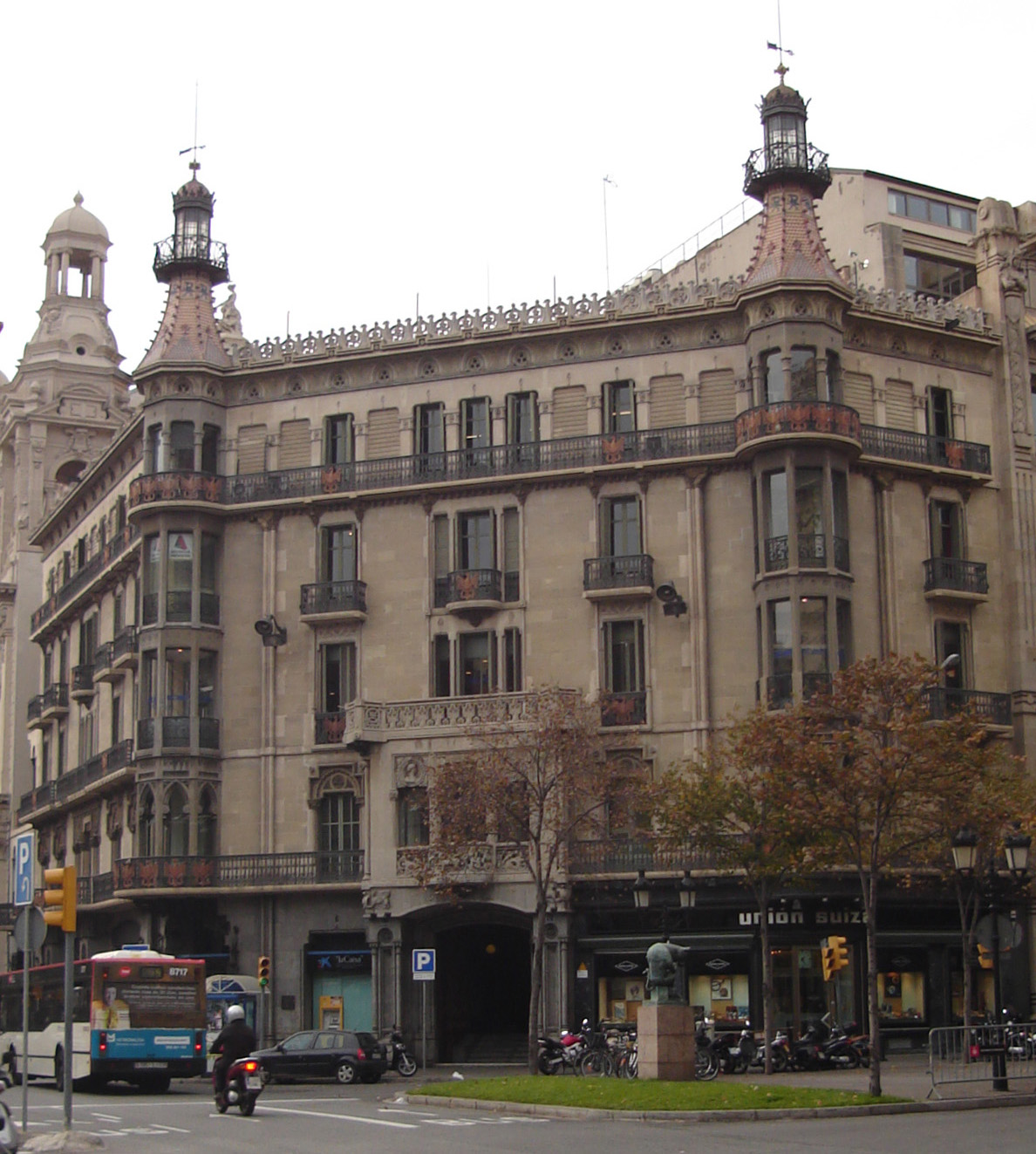
Casa Pia Batlló

Josep Vilaseca i Casanovas (Catalan pronunciation: [ʒuˈzɛb ˌbiləˈsɛkə]; Barcelona, Spain 1848–1910) was a Spanish architect and artist who formed part of the Modernista movement.

He studied architecture in Madrid and qualified in 1873. He travelled with Lluís Domènech i Montaner in Germany. By 1874 he was already teaching at the Escuela de Arquitectura de Barcelona, a post he held for the rest of his life.

Amongst his best-known works is the Arc de Triomf in Barcelona, built for the 1888 Universal Exposition. His work is a textbook case of the evolution of late neo-Classicism into Modernisme which took place in Catalan architecture towards the end of the 19th century.

He served as president of the Asociación de Arquitectos de Cataluña.

Other notable works:

- Casa Vilaseca, Plaça Urquinaona, 1874. No longer exists.
- Institucions Provincials de Cultura, jointly with Lluís Domènech i Montaner, 1877.
- Casa Pia Batlló , in Rambla de Catalunya, 1901.
- Casa Comas i Argemí , in Avinguda de la República Argentina, 1909.
- Casa Cabot , in Carrer de Lloria, 8, 1906.
- Cases Batlló, on the corner of Carrer Mallorca and Passeig de Gràcia.
- Casa Bruno Quadros , in the Rambla.
