= Albert Teruel =

Spanish basketball player (born 1987)

Albert Teruel (born 3 April 1987 in Barcelona) is a Spanish professional basketball player who played for CB Girona.
