= Vicente Martorell Otzet =

Spanish military engineer and urban planner

- Born: Vicenç Martorell i Otzet; 1903; Barcelona, Catalonia, Spain
- Died: Spain
- Citizenship: Spanish
- Occupations: Military engineer; Urban planner; Author
- Known for: President of the Barcelona urban planning commission

Vicente Martorell Otzet (1903 – unknown) was a Spanish military engineer, urban planner, and author.

== Early life ==
Vicente Martorell was born in the Catalonian capital of Barcelona in 1903, as the son of Emilia Otzet and Vicente Martorell Portas, a military engineer. He had two younger brothers, Fernando and Alberto, who both followed medicine, as well as one older brother Ramón, with both of them deciding instead to follow in their father's footsteps, becoming military engineers.

According to his brother Alberto, it was Vicente who introduced him to the world of football, in which Alberto became a renowned player as a goalkeeper for Espanyol.

== Military career ==
During the Spanish Civil War, Vicente and his brother Ramón fought for the Republican faction, but while the latter went on to become Commander-in-Chief of the Red Army, Vicente was forced to defect to the Nationalist side following some disagreements with the Republican leaders. He was later captured by the Republican side and imprisoned on a warship docked in the port of Barcelona, but thanks to his brother's influence, he escaped execution. The victory of Francisco Franco's faction allowed Vicente to be released, but also caused his brother Ramón and his family to flee the country, to which he never returned.

== Professional career ==
Like his father, Martorell held several positions in public administration as a worker in urban planning, spending 13 years designing urban plans in Morocco in the 1940s and early 1950s. On 14 May 1943, Martorell, then a subdelegate of Public Works and Communications of the High Commission of Spain in Morocco, gave a lecture about his upcoming book called Los ferrocarriles en nuestra zona de protectorado ("The railways in our protectorate area"). After returning to Barcelona, he participated in the works of the Pedralbes and cavalry barracks, and in 1953, he became the first president of the newly-established Barcelona urban planning commission. In 1955, he became the manager of the regional plan for the Barcelona urban planning commission, and he then spent 13 years, from 1957 until 1970, as the delegate of the Ministry of Housing in Barcelona.

== Writing career ==
In 1959, Martorell wrote La gestión urbanística en el orden funcional ("Urban Management in the Functional Order"), and in 1970, he contributed to Historia del urbanismo en Barcelona ("History of Urban Planning in Barcelona").
