= Luís Gamito =

Spanish football manager

Personal information
- Full name: Luís Gamito Iturralde
- Date of birth: 17 December 1893
- Place of birth: Pamplona, Spain
- Date of death: 29 October 1966 (aged 72)
- Place of death: Barcelona, Spain

Managerial career
- Years: Team
- 1923–1958: Espanyol youth system

Luís Gamito Iturralde, better known by his nickname Pasabalón (17 December 1893 – 29 October 1966), was a Spanish football manager who served as the technical director of the youth teams of Espanyol and Penya Saprissa for 35 years, from 1923 until 1958.

== Early life ==
Born on 17 December 1893 in the Navarran town of Pamplona, Gamito grew up as a fan of the Pamplona SC, which went on to merge with New Club to form CA Osasuna on 24 October 1920.

== Career ==
After a short stint at Argentina, he settled in Barcelona in 1923, where he quickly became a fan of Espanyol, so much so that he proposed to them the idea of creating a youth football team, which was approved. He was hired by Genaro de la Riva, the then president of Espanyol, to restructure and coordinate the club's youth system. He proceeded to close down the club's second, third, and fourth teams, replacing them with three children's teams, which he called Pasabalón, Los chavales, and Iruña. He then set up a scouting system capable of locating players, confirming their potential, and then successfully convincing them that playing in Espanyol's lower echelons was their best option, with Gamito himself attending several matches in different Barcelona neighborhoods to recruit talented young players, being also dedicated to recruiting those who played in the streets. During this period, he earned the nickname Pasabalón ("pass the ball") because it was his most frequent instruction to the players.

The maintenance of the youth academy, however, became too costly for Espanyol, so in 1930, his friend Ricardo Saprissa agreed to became its patron, with the youth team being renamed Peña Saprissa and later Grupo Deportivo Saprissa, which went on to produce the likes of Alberto Martorell, José Trías, Ricardo Teruel, and Félix Llimós.

Having no family of his own, Pasabalón was always grateful to the club for the affection shown towards him, being the subject of a tribute match organized by Espanyol on 31 May 1953. He remained loyal to the club for 35 years, from 1923 until his retirement in 1958.

== Death and legacy ==
Pasabalón died in Barcelona on 29 October 1966, at the age of 72.

On the occasion of the 100th anniversary of the Espanyol's youth academy on 7 November 2023, the club organized a commemorative event held at the Stage Front Stadium, which was attended by all the men's and women's youth football teams.
