= Leva del biberón =

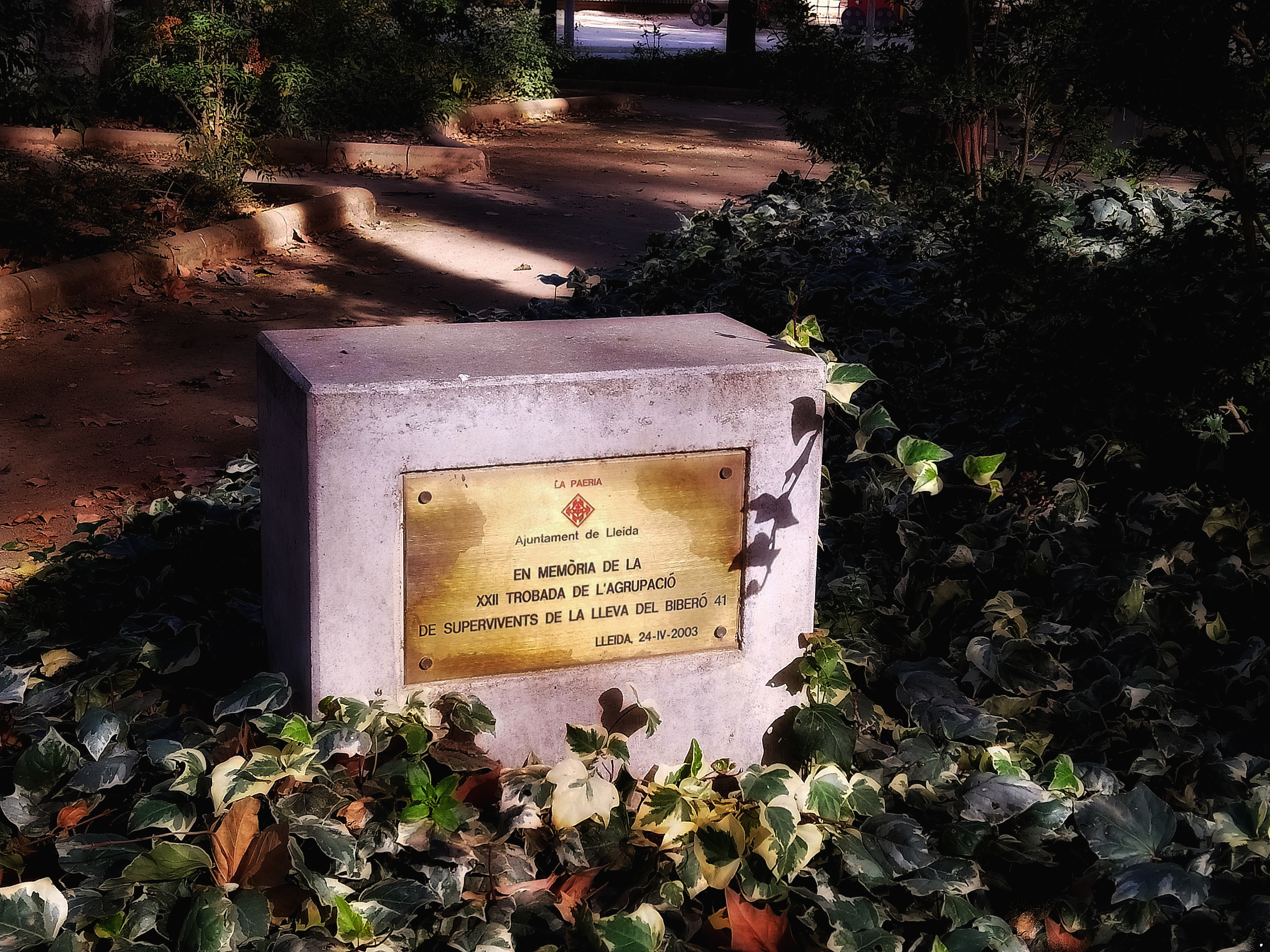
Lleida. – Commemorative plaque of the XXII meeting of the Quinta del Biberón.

The "leva del Biberón" (also known as the "quinta del Biberón", the "Baby Bottle Levy" in English) was the name given to the levies of 1938 and 1939 throughout the territory that republican Spain still controlled during the last years of the Spanish Civil War, with boys aged from 14 to 18. Mobilized by order of the President of the Second Spanish Republic, Manuel Azaña, at the end of April 1938. At that time, Franco's troops had attacked Lleida, Gandesa, Balaguer, Tremp and Camarasa and were taking control of the last points of republican resistance in Catalonia.

== Objective ==
In total, some 30,000 young people were called up, coming from all over the national territory to fight on the republican side: Murcia, Catalonia, Old Castilla and Valencia, among others. Among them there were future personalities such as cartoonist Jesús Blasco. First they had to cover auxiliary tasks, but on 25 July 1938 they were already participating in the Republican offensive which triggered the Battle of the Ebro, the vast majority being minors, some kids were only 14 years old.

It is believed that it received this name when Federica Montseny referred to all of them in this way: “Seventeen years old? but they still are sucking the baby bottle!".

They were in the bloody battles of Merengue and Baladredo, both at the Segre front during the so-called offensive of Catalonia. They also took part in the Battle of the Ebro and some were assigned to the Alpine battalion, in the Lleida Pyrenees.

== Aftermath ==
After the war, very different fates arose. Some kids went into exile in France and ended up in the concentration camps of Argelès-sur-Mer, Saint-Cyprien and Agde. Others, in the Francoist prisons and in the concentration camps of Vitoria and Miranda de Ebro and others went to battalions of workers distributed throughout Spain and did military service in Zaragoza, Barcelona and even in the Spanish Sahara. Another part of the young people were freed by the Franco regime in case of being captured since, as was normal throughout the conflict, in many cases the ideology of those called up was not reciprocal to the side that forced them to enlist by force.

In 1983, some 307 survivors and 412 relatives founded the "Agrupación de Supervivientes de la Leva del Biberón-41".

== Bibliography ==
- Piera González, E. (2006) La quinta del Biberó. Universitat de Barcelona (in Catalan) . Peace Prize 2006: awards ceremony.
- Fuentes Conesa, C (2019) Write me if you want
