= Teruel (disambiguation) =

Teruel is a municipality of the Province of Teruel, Aragon, Spain.

Teruel may also refer to:

== Places ==
- Teruel (Spanish Congress Electoral District), the electoral district covering the Province of Teruel for elections to the Spanish Parliament
- Province of Teruel, a province of Aragon, Spain
- Teruel Community, a comarca of province of Teruel, Aragon, Spain
- Teruel, Huila, a municipality in the Huila Department, Colombia

== Buildings and facilities ==
- Teruel Airport, an international airport near Teruel, Aragon, Spain
- Teruel Cathedral, a church in Teruel, Aragon, Spain
- Teruel Power Plant, a lignite-fired power plant near the town of Andorra in the province of Teruel, Aragon, Spain

== Film and literature ==
- Lovers of Teruel, a romance story alleged to have taken place in 1217 in the city of Teruel, Aragon, Spain
- The Lovers of Teruel (film), a 1962 French musical film directed by Raymond Rouleau
- Sierra de Teruel, the Spanish name for L'espoir (film), a 1945 Spanish black-and-white war film

== Military ==
- Teruel (multiple rocket launcher), a multiple rocket launcher in service with the Spanish Army until 2009
- Teruel, a Spanish Navy destroyer which previously served as the Italian cruiser Guglielmo Pepe
- The Battle of Teruel, fought in and around the city of Teruel in 1937–1938 during the Spanish Civil War

== Sports ==
- CD Teruel, a Spanish football team based in Teruel, Aragon, Spain
- CV Teruel, a Spanish volleyball team based in Teruel, Aragon, Spain
