= Arc de Triomf =

Arch in Barcelona, Spain by Josep Vilaseca i Casanovas

Coordinates: 41°23′27″N 2°10′50″E

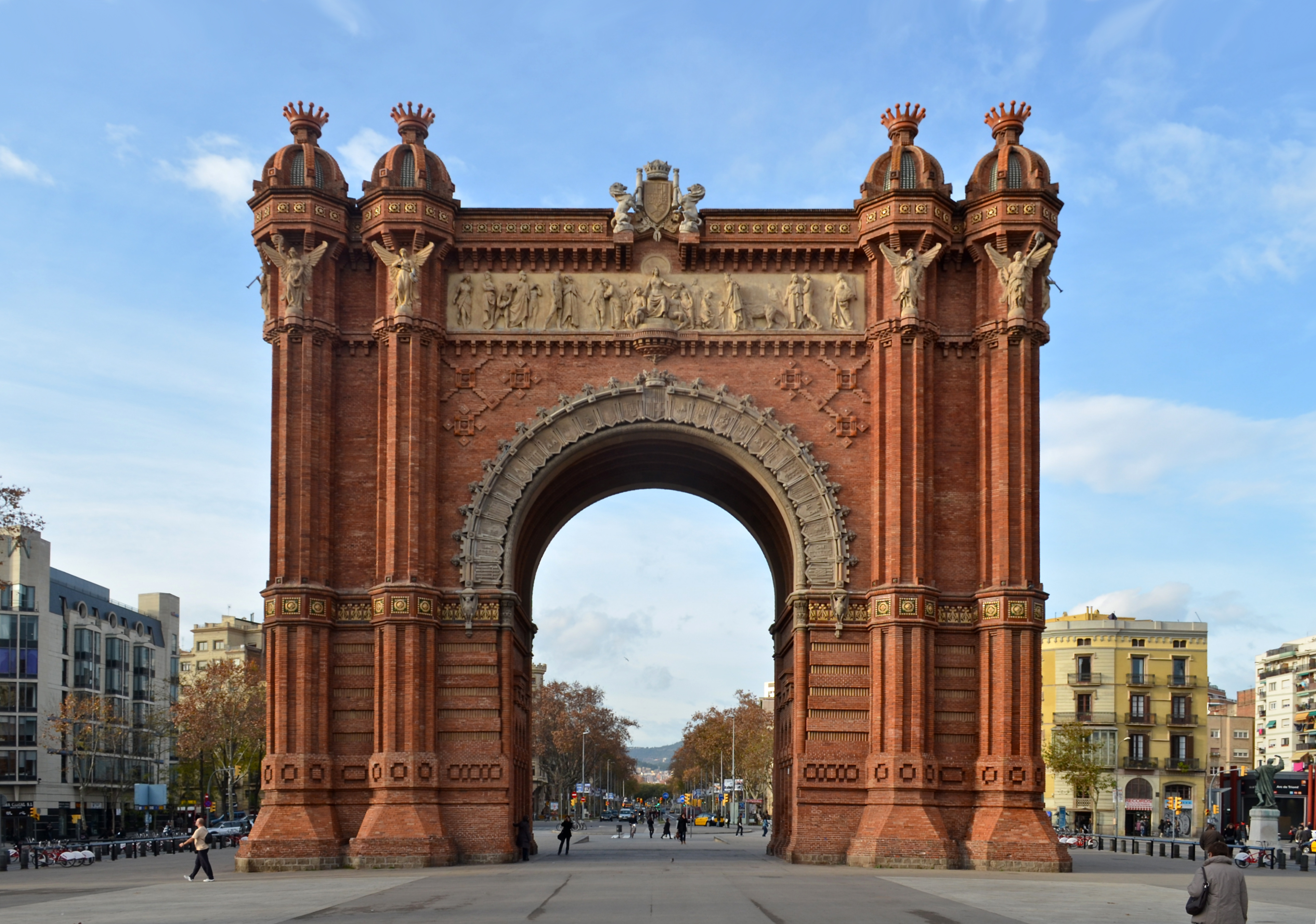

General information
- Type: Memorial arch
- Architectural style: Neo-Mudéjar
- Location: Passeig de Lluís Companys, Barcelona, Spain
- Inaugurated: 20 May 1888

Height
- Height: 29.8 metres (98 ft)

Dimensions
- Other dimensions: Wide: 27.7 metres (91 ft); Deep: 12.4 metres (41 ft)

Technical details
- Material: Brickwork

Design and construction
- Architect: Josep Vilaseca

Other information
- Public transit: Arc de Triomf; Arc de Triomf

The Arc de Triomf (Catalan pronunciation: [ˈarɡ də tɾiˈoɱf]), translated: Arch of Victory, is a memorial arch in Barcelona, Catalonia, Spain. It was built by architect Josep Vilaseca i Casanovas as the main access gate for the 1888 Barcelona World Fair. The arch crosses over the wide central promenade of the Passeig de Lluís Companys, leading to the Ciutadella Park that now occupies the site of the world fair. It is located at the northern end of the promenade, facing the Passeig de Sant Joan.

== History ==
The Arc de Triomf was constructed between 1887 and 1888 as the ceremonial main entrance to the 1888 Barcelona Universal Exposition (Exposició Universal de Barcelona), the first world's fair held in the city. The arch was inaugurated on 20 May 1888, shortly after the opening of the exposition, and welcomed visitors arriving along the Saló de Sant Joan (today the Passeig de Lluís Companys).

Following the closure of the Universal Exposition in December 1888, the Arc de Triomf remained in place as one of the principal surviving monuments of the event. As the surrounding Saló de Sant Joan evolved into the present-day Passeig de Lluís Companys, the arch became an important urban landmark linking the Eixample district with the Ciutadella Park and the historic center. Throughout the 20th century it served as a prominent setting for civic ceremonies, public celebrations, demonstrations, and sporting events, including acting as the finish area for several editions of the Barcelona Marathon and the Jean Bouin road race.

The monument underwent a major restoration in 1989 to address deterioration of its brickwork and sculptural decoration. In the early 2020s, municipal heritage studies identified significant structural and material degradation, particularly affecting the artificial stone sculptures and iron reinforcements. In response, the Barcelona City Council initiated plans for a comprehensive restoration intended to secure the monument's long-term conservation while preserving its original decorative program.

== Design ==
The arch is built in reddish brickwork in the Neo-Mudéjar style. The front frieze contains the stone sculpture Barcelona rep les nacions (Catalan for "Barcelona welcomes the nations") by Josep Reynés. The opposite frieze contains a stone carving entitled Recompensa ("Recompense"), a work from Josep Llimona's earliest period, representing the granting of awards to the participants in the World Exposition. The friezes along the sides of the arch include allegories of agriculture, industry and trade by Antoni Vilanova and of sciences and arts by Torquat Tassó. The two pillars of the arch feature bats carved in stone, which were the emblem of King Jaume I, who ruled over a period of prosperity in Barcelona.

=== Frieze ===
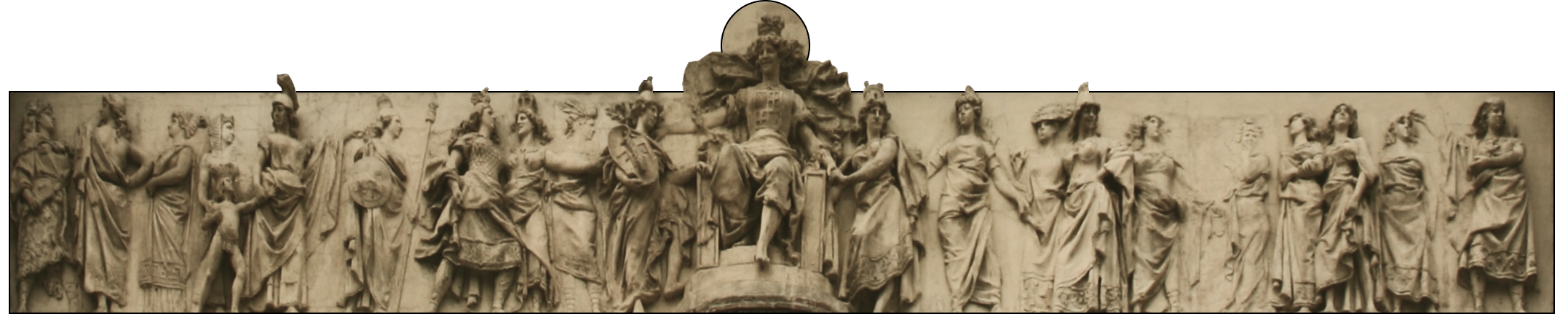
Barcelona welcomes the nations, Josep Reynés.
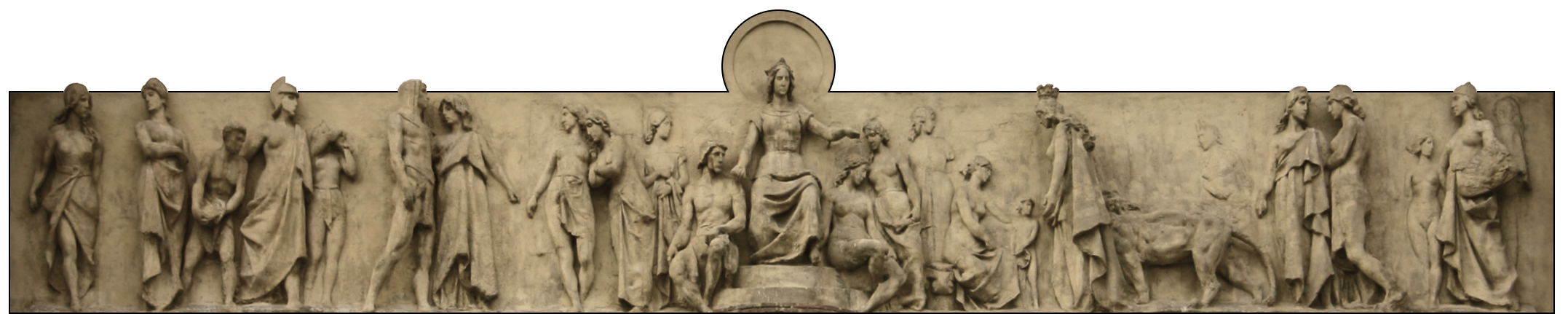
Recompense, Josep Llimona.
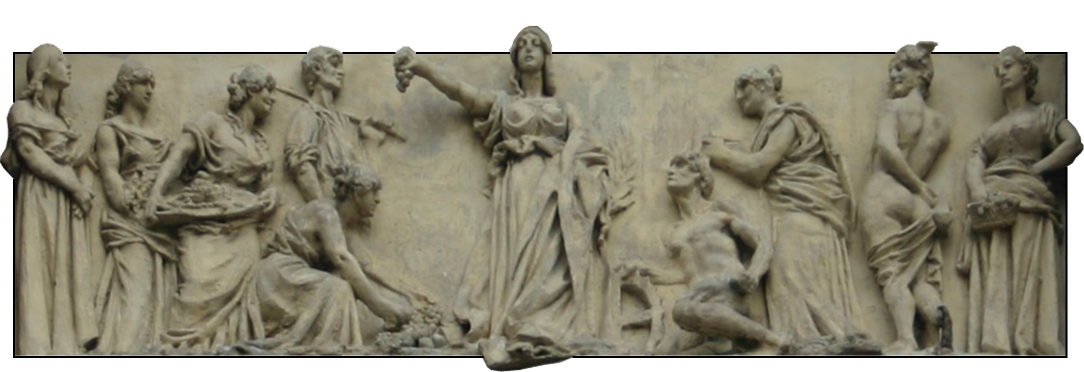
Apotheosis of agriculture, industry and trade. Antoni Vilanova.

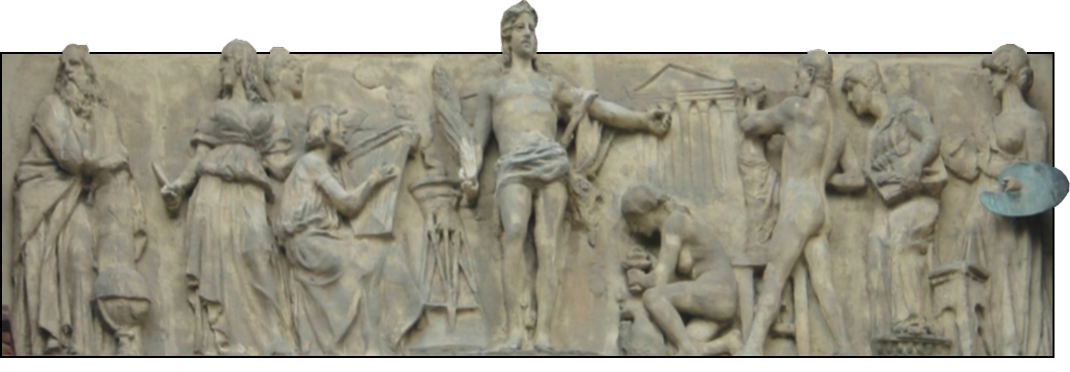
Apotheosis of sciences and arts. Torquat Tassó.

=== Armorial ===
Coat of arms of the King of Spain

The voussoirs of the arch are made of stone sculpted like a large laurel wreath that supports the coats of arms of the forty-nine provinces that formed the Kingdom of Spain in 1888. The keystone of both arches presents the coat of arms of the city of Barcelona, above the rest of the shields and in larger dimensions.

Tarra- gona

Alicante

Logroño

Mallorca

Almería

Ponte- vedra

Huelva

Badajoz

Lugo

Huesca

Teruel

Madrid

== Other triumphal arches ==
Similar structures can be found in many other cities, most notably including the Arc de Triomphe in Paris, the Wellington Arch in London, the Soldiers' and Sailors' Arch in New York City, and the Arcul de Triumf in Bucharest, plus many from the Roman era. This arch, however, is a non-military arch. It does not romanticize war, nor does it intend to celebrate Spain's military victories, but rather it was built as the gateway to the 1888 World Fair and was thus intended to welcome people.
