= Alberto Martorell Lossius =

Spanish tennis player (born 1950)

- Country (sports): Spain
- Born: 18 July 1950 (age 75) Barcelona, Spain

Singles
- Career record: 1–7
- Career titles: 0
- Highest ranking: No. 225 (29 July 1974)

Doubles
- Career record: 0–4
- Career titles: 0
Medal record
Mediterranean Games
Bronze medal – third place	1979 Split	Doubles
- Last updated on: March 22, 2020.

Alberto Martorell Lossius (born 18 July 1950) is a Spanish retired tennis player who won a bronze medal at the 1979 Mediterranean Games.

He is a son of the late Alberto Martorell Otzet, a football goalkeeper who played for Español from 1933 to 1945 and also for the Spain national team.
