= Ricardo Teruel (footballer) =

Spanish footballer (1917–1975)

Personal information
- Full name: Ricardo Teruel García
- Date of birth: 25 May 1917
- Place of birth: Gijón, Spain
- Date of death: 3 November 1975 (aged 58)
- Place of death: Barcelona, Spain
- Height: 1.69 m (5 ft 7 in)
- Position: Defender

Youth career
- Peña Rosés
- Peña Guardiola
- 1932–1935: Penya Saprissa

Senior career*
Years	Team	Apps	(Gls)
1935–1936	Espanyol		
1939–1947	Espanyol		
1947–1948	Mallorca		
1948–1950	Espanyol		
1950–1952	Racing de Santander		
1952–1953	Sant Andreu		
1953–1954	Espanyol		

International career
1941–1942	Spain	4	(0)
1941–1950	Catalonia	4	(2)
- * Club domestic league appearances and goals

Ricardo Teruel García (25 February 1917 – 3 November 1975) was a Spanish footballer who played as a defender for Espanyol in the 1940s. He was considered the best Spanish right-back after the Spanish Civil War, playing four matches for Spain in 1941–42, and a few more for the Catalan national team between 1941 and 1950.

== Club career ==
=== Early career ===
Born on 25 February 1917 in the Asturias town of Gijón, Teruel was two months old when his father's work, a small textile business, forced the family to move to Catalonia, where he began his career at Peña Rosés, from which he joined Peña Guardiola, where he quickly stood out from his teammates due to his prodigious abilities, which soon caught the attention of Pasabalón, the head of Peña Saprissa, Espanyol's youth academy, where he played for a few years.

=== Espanyol ===
Teruel then joined the club's amateur team, with whom he won the Catalan Amateur Championship, after which he was called up for the first team, making his debut in a Catalan regional championship match against Badalona in October 1935. Two months later, on 1 December, he made his La Liga debut against Athletic Bilbao, scoring against Guillermo Gorostiza. His biggest strength was his speed, comparable to that of a sprinter.

In 1939, after a three-year hiatus caused by the outbreak of the Spanish Civil War, Teruel returned to Espanyol, and in his first season back, he helped his side win the 1939–40 Campionat de Catalunya, the last-ever edition of the Catalan championships, and then the 1940 Copa del Generalísimo, starting in the final in a 3–2 win over Real Madrid. He stayed at Espanyol for 15 years, from 1935 until 1940 (except for the 1947–48 season, which he was loaned to Mallorca), scoring a total of 7 goals in 195 official matches, including 5 goals in 133 La Liga matches.

After leaving Espnayol, Teruel signed for Racing de Santander, with whom he played for two seasons, until 1952, when he went to Sant Andreu, where he retired in 1953, aged 36. In total, he scored 5 goals 152 La Liga matches for Espanyol and Santander.

=== International career ===
On 28 December 1941, the 24-year-old Teruel made his international debut for Spain in a friendly match against Switzerland at the Mestalla Stadium, helping his side to a 3–2 victory. In total, he earned four international caps for Spain, which ended in two wins, one draw, and one loss.

As an Espanyol player, Teruel was eligible to play for Catalonia, which he did for 9 years, between 1941 and 1950, including some charity matches.

== Later life and death ==
After retiring, Teruel worked as a taxi driver and company chauffeur in Barcelona, where he died on 3 November 1975, at the age of 58.

== Honours ==
RCD Espanyol

- Copa del Rey:
  - Champions (1): 1940
- Campionat de Catalunya:
  - Champions (2): 1936–37 and 1939–40
