= Antoni Viladomat =

Spanish painter (1678–1755)

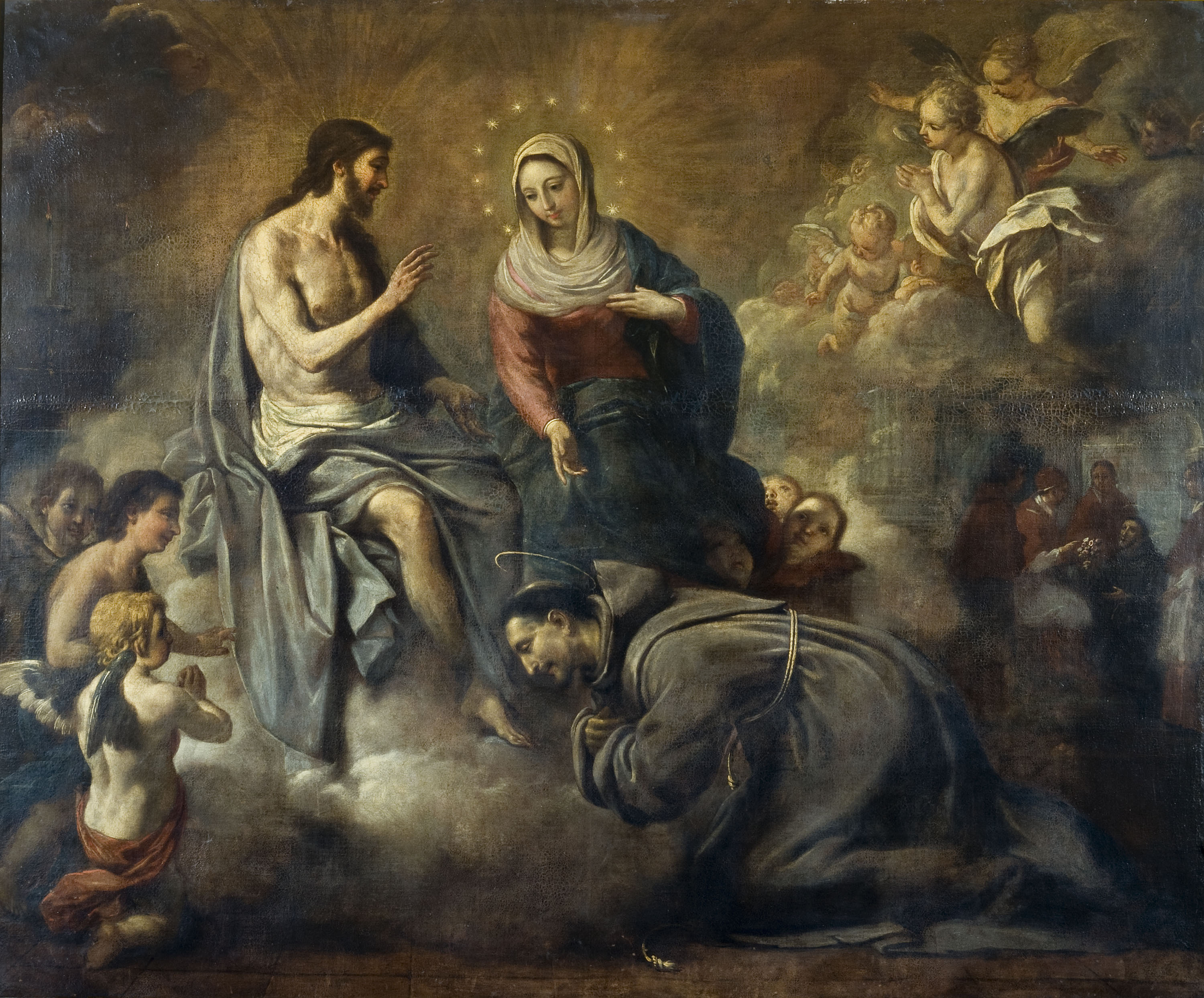
Jesus Grants Indulgence to Saint Francis at Porziuncula (1722/24)

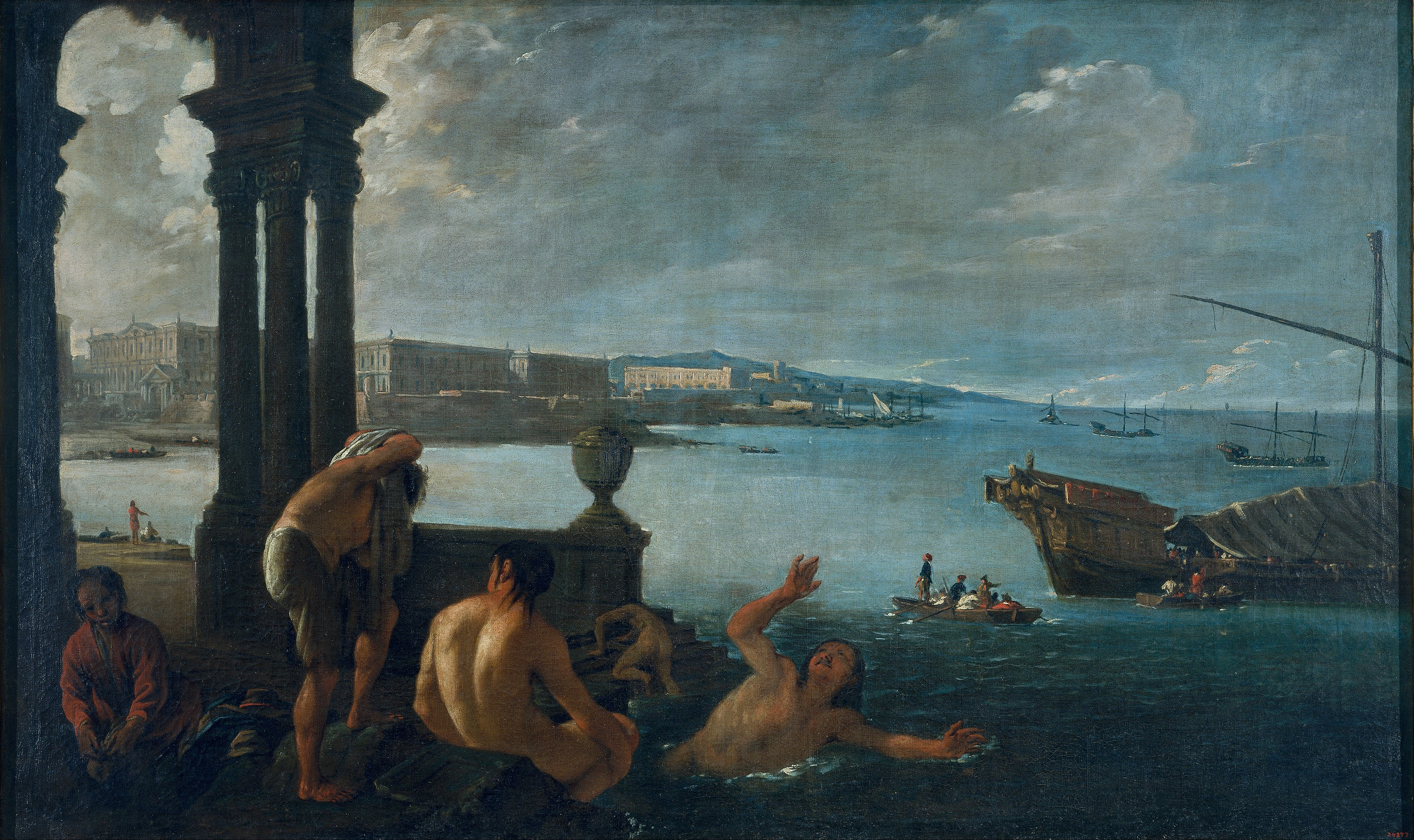
Summer, from The Four Seasons (1730–35)

Antoni Viladomat i Manalt (20 March 1678 in Barcelona, Spain – 22 January 1755 in Barcelona, Spain) was a Spanish painter in the Baroque style.

== Biography ==
His father was a gilder. He appears to have taken his first formal art lessons in the workshop of Pasqual Bailon Savall (c. 1650–1691), a native of Berga like his father. Bailon's early death led Viladomat to become apprenticed with Joan Baptista Perramon (c. 1664–1743). He remained with him for at least six years; possibly nine. After that, he worked on the Church of San Miguel (demolished in 1868) with the painter and architect, Ferdinando Galli-Bibiena. By this means, he became acquainted with Italian art.

In 1723, his opposition to the strict regimen imposed by the "Colegio de Pintores" (a Medieval-style painter's guild) led him to file a lawsuit so he could obtain the title of "licensed painter" and work freely. His suit was successful, but continued conflict led him to file another suit to retain the title in 1739.

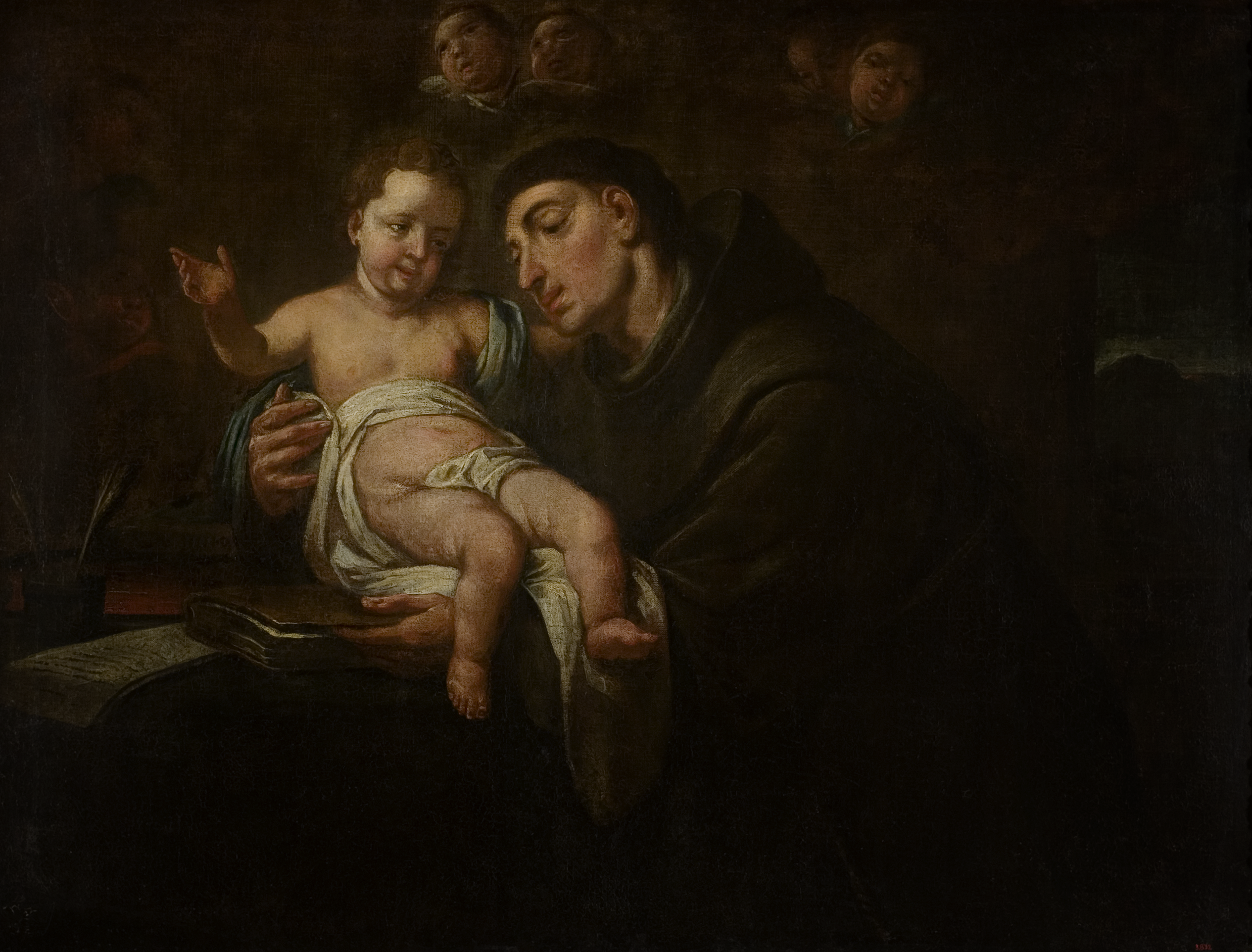
Vision of Saint Anthony (1720)

His long career enabled him to paint at almost all the convents and monasteries in Barcelona. His cycle of twenty paintings on the life of Saint Francis of Assisi, originally created for the old Franciscan monastery from 1722 to 1724, are now in the collection of the Museu Nacional d'Art de Catalunya (National Art Museum of Catalonia). This was his primary claim to fame and, together with a cycle of forty paintings on the Stations of the Cross and the Virgin Mary in the Basílica de Santa Maria de Mataró, constitute the majority of his preserved works. Some paintings historically attributed to him, at the Old Hospital de la Santa Creu and the Jesuit Church in Tarragona, have recently come into question.

In addition to painting, he taught drawing in his workshop. Apprenticeships there were eagerly sought after. His son, Josep Viladomat i Esmandia (1722–1786), also became a painter. He was best known for a cycle of paintings (in his father's style) on the life of Saint Thomas Aquinas.
