= Passeig de Sant Joan, Barcelona =

Thoroughfare in Barcelona, Spain

Coordinates: 41°24′02″N 2°10′05″E

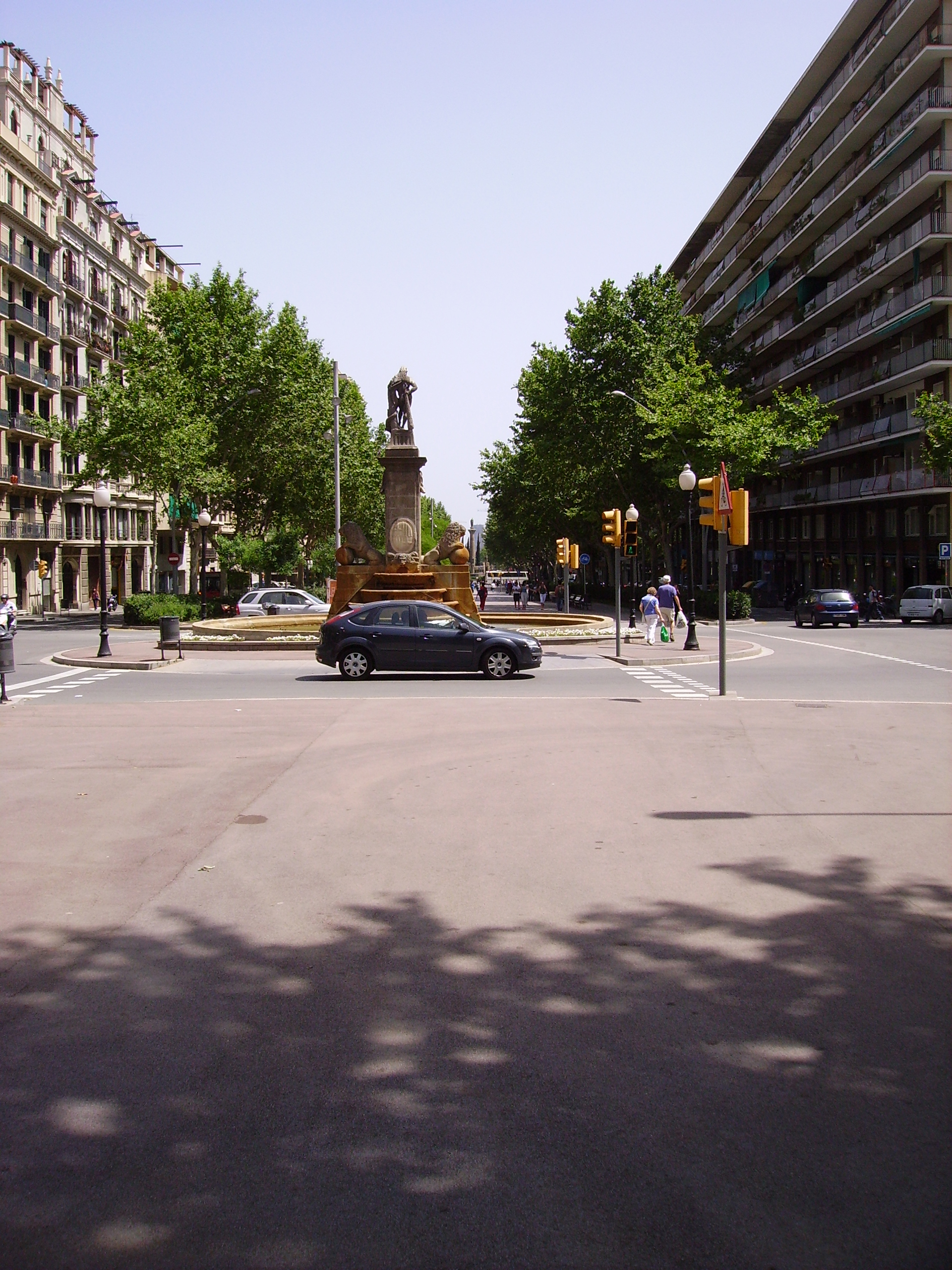
Passeig de Sant Joan, Barcelona

Passeig de Sant Joan (Catalan pronunciation: [pəˈsɛdʒ də ˈsaɲ ʒuˈan]) is a major avenue in the Eixample and Gràcia districts of Barcelona. It was named after an older street carrying this name, also known as Passeig Nou, built in 1795 around the glacis of the Ciutadella fortress.

It starts at the Arc de Triomf, where it meets Avinguda de Vilanova, Carrer de Trafalgar and Passeig de Lluís Companys (its continuation towards the Parc de la Ciutadella), and continues westwards through the Eixample district until it reaches Travessera de Gràcia in the lower part of Gràcia.

== Buildings and monuments ==
- Verdaguer monument (1924) by Josep Maria Pericàs.
- Església de Salesas (1882–1885) by Joan Martorell.
- Arc de Triomf
- Palau Macaya by Josep Puig i Cadafalch
- Plaça Tetuan

== Culture ==
=== Museums ===
- Barcelona Sewer Museum (Museu del Clavegueram de Barcelona)

=== Other ===
- Ateneu Enciclopèdic Popular – founded in 1902.
- Biblioteca Pública Arús

== Transport ==
=== Metro ===
- Verdaguer (L4, L5)
- Arc de Triomf (L1)

=== Bus ===
- Line 6 Pg. Manuel Girona – Poblenou
- Line 15 Hospital St. Pau – Collblanc
- Line 19 El Port Vell – Sant Genís
- Line 20 Estació Marítima – Pl. Congrés
- Line 39 Barceloneta – Horta
- Line 45 Pg. Marítim – Horta
- Line 47 Pl. Catalunya – Canyelles
- Line 50 Montjuïc – Trinitat Nova
- Line 51 Pla de Palau – Ciutat Meridiana
- Line 55 Parc de Montjuïc – Plaça Catalunya

== See also ==
- Passeig de Lluís Companys
- List of streets and squares in Eixample
- Street names in Barcelona
- Urban planning of Barcelona
