= 1973–74 FC Barcelona season =

75th season in existence of FC Barcelona

FC Barcelona
1973–74 season
- President: Agustí Montal Costa
- Manager: Rinus Michels
- Stadium: Camp Nou
- La Liga: Champion
- Copa del Generalísimo: Runner-up
- UEFA Cup: First round
- Joan Gamper Trophy: Winner
- Top goalscorer: League: Marcial (17 goals); All: Marcial (17 goals)
Home colours	Away colours

The 1973–74 season was the 75th season in the history of FC Barcelona.

== Squad ==
Note: Flags indicate national team as defined under FIFA eligibility rules; some limited exceptions apply. Players may hold more than one non-FIFA nationality.

No.	Pos.	Nation	Player
—	GK	ESP	Salvador Sadurní
—	GK	ESP	Pere Valentí Mora
—	GK	ESP	Joan Capó
—	DF	ESP	Joaquim Rifé (Captain)
—	DF	ESP	Antoni Torres
—	DF	ESP	Francisco Gallego
—	DF	ESP	Antonio de la Cruz
—	DF	ESP	Jose Laredo
—	DF	ESP	Manuel Tomé
—	DF	ESP	Migueli
—	DF	ESP	Pedro Zabalza
—	MF	ESP	Martí Filosia
—	MF	ESP	Juan Carlos
—	MF	ESP	Marcial Pina

No.	Pos.	Nation	Player
—	MF	ESP	Quique Costas
—	MF	ESP	Juan Manuel Asensi
—	MF	ESP	Jorge Carreño
—	MF	ESP	Carles Rexach
—	FW	PER	Hugo Sotil
—	FW	NED	Johan Cruyff
—	FW	ESP	Lluís Pujol
—	FW	ESP	Jose Maria Pérez
—	FW	ESP	Manuel Clares
—	FW	ESP	Juanito
—	FW	ESP	José Antonio Barrios
—	FW	ARG	Bernardo Cos
—	FW	PER	Pedro Aicart
—	FW	ESP	Rodri

=== Transfers ===
In
Pos.	Name	from	Type
FW	Johan Cruijff	AFC Ajax	
FW	Hugo Sotil	Deportivo Municipal	
DF	Migueli	Cadiz CF	
FW	Pedro Aicart	Universitario de Deportes	

Out
Pos.	Name	To	Type
GK	Miguel Reina	Atletico Madrid	
FW	Ramon Alfonseda	Elche CF	
DF	Alfonso Cortés	RCD Mallorca	loan
FW	Joan Mas Llobera	UE Sant Andreu	loan

==== Winter ====
In
Pos.	Name	from	Type

Out
Pos.	Name	To	Type
FW	Pedro Aicart	Hercules CF	

== Results ==
=== Friendlies ===
25 July 1973	Granollers	0–4	FC Barcelona

4 August 1973	Fortuna Düsseldorf-	3–3	FC Barcelona

5 August 1973	Baesweiler 09-	2–4	FC Barcelona

7 August 1973	P.S.V. Eindhoven	1–0	FC Barcelona

9 August 1973	Vaassen FSC	0–6	FC Barcelona

12 August 1973	Royal Antwerp-	0–2	FC Barcelona

15 August 1973	Sparta Rotterdam-	2–0	FC Barcelona

29 August 1973	Europa	1–6	FC Barcelona	Barcelona

5 September 1973	FC Barcelona	6–0	Cercle Brugge	Barcelona

26 September 1973	FC Barcelona	2–0	Kickers Offenbach	Barcelona
				Stadium: Camp Nou

16 October 1973	FC Barcelona	1–0	Arsenal F.C.	Barcelona
				Stadium: Camp Nou

20 October 1973	Ourense	1–3	FC Barcelona	Ourense

1 November 1973	Girona	0–5	FC Barcelona	Girona

25 November 1973	Lleida Esportiu	1–5	FC Barcelona	Lleida

10 February 1974	FC Barcelona	1–1	Legia Warsaw	Barcelona
				Stadium: Camp Nou

21 February 1974	Manresa	1–3	FC Barcelona

12 March 1974	Arsenal F.C.	1–3	FC Barcelona	London
				Stadium: Highbury Park

23 April 1974	R.S.C. Anderlecht-	1–1	FC Barcelona	Anderlecht

1 May 1974	Wydad Casablanca	1–3	FC Barcelona	Casablanca
	Mujahed 67'		De la Cruz 9'; Juanito 35'; Marcial 57'	Stadium: Stade d'Honneur; Attendance: 25,000

8 May 1974	Nastic	0–3	FC Barcelona

13 May 1974	FC Barcelona	5–3	Hertha BSC	Barcelona
				Stadium: Camp Nou

19 May 1974	P.S.V. Eindhoven	2–1	FC Barcelona	Eindhoven

=== Joan Gamper Trophy ===
21 August 1973	FC Barcelona	5-0	Deportivo Municipal	Barcelona

22 August 1973	FC Barcelona	2-2 (5-3 p)	Borussia Mönchengladbach	Barcelona
				Stadium: Camp Nou

== Competitions ==
=== Primera Division ===
==== League table ====
Pos	Team	Pld	W	D	L	GF	GA	GD	Pts	Qualification or relegation
1	Barcelona (C)	34	21	8	5	75	24	+51	50	Qualification for the European Cup first round
2	Atlético Madrid	34	16	8	10	50	31	+19	40	Qualification for the UEFA Cup first round
3	Zaragoza	34	16	7	11	51	38	+13	39	Qualification for the UEFA Cup first round
4	Real Sociedad	34	15	8	11	46	45	+1	38	Qualification for the UEFA Cup first round
5	Athletic Bilbao	34	15	7	12	35	31	+4	37	

Source: BDFútbol
Rules for classification: 1) Points; 2) Head-to-head results; 3) Goal difference; 4) Number of goals scored
(C) Champions

==== Position by round ====
Round	1	2	3	4	5	6	7	8	9	10	11	12	13	14	15	16	17	18	19	20	21	22	23	24	25	26	27	28	29	30	31	32	33	34
Ground	H	A	H	A	H	A	A	H	A	H	A	H	A	H	A	H	A	A	H	A	H	A	H	H	A	H	A	H	A	H	A	H	A	H
Result	L	D	L	W	L	D	W	W	D	W	D	W	W	W	W	W	W	W	W	W	D	W	W	W	D	W	D	W	W	D	W	L	W	L
Position	15	17	17	14	17	17	14	14	8	3	4	2	1	1	1	1	1	1	1	1	1	1	1	1	1	1	1	1	1	1	1	1	1	1

Source: www.lfp.es
A = Away; H = Home; W = Win; D = Draw; L = Loss; = 1974-75 European Cup; = 1974-75 UEFA Cup; = 1974-75 Segunda Division

==== Matches ====
2 September 1973 1	Elche CF	1-0	FC Barcelona	Elche
	Chiva 5'	Report		Stadium: Campo de Altabix

9 September 1973 2	FC Barcelona	0-0	Racing Santander	Barcelona
		Report		Stadium: Camp Nou

16 September 1973 3	Celta Vigo	2-1	FC Barcelona	Vigo
	Doblas 17'; Perez 22' (pen.)	Report	Sotil 64'	Stadium: Balaídos

23 September 1973 4	FC Barcelona	3-0	RCD Español	Barcelona
	Martial 64' Asensi 73' Perez 81'	Report		Stadium: Camp Nou

30 September 1973 5	Real Sociedad	2-1	FC Barcelona	San Sebastián
	Azrats 72' , 89'	Report	Marsial 20'	Stadium: Atotxa

7 October 1973 6	FC Barcelona	0-0	Real Madrid	Barcelona
		Report		Stadium: Camp Nou

12 October 1973 7	CD Castellón	0-2	FC Barcelona	Castellón de la Plana
		Report	Marsial 32'; Perez 56'

28 October 1973 8	FC Barcelona	4-0	Granada CF	Barcelona
	de la Cruz 44' Cruyff 50' , 68' Sotil 59'	Report		Stadium: Camp Nou

4 November 1973 9	Real Murcia	2-2	FC Barcelona	Murcia
	Cristo 35'; Canito 64'	Report	Marsial 15'; Sotil 30' (pen.)	Stadium: La Condomina

11 November 1973 10	FC Barcelona	2-0	Athletic Bilbao	Barcelona
	Sotil 29'; Marsial 37'	Report		Stadium: Camp Nou

18 November 1973 11	Real Zaragoza	2-2	FC Barcelona	Zaragoza
	Castani 11' , 72' (pen.)	Report	Marsial 42' , 73'	Stadium: La Romareda

2 December 1973 12	FC Barcelona	5-1	Sporting Gijón	Barcelona
	Cruyff 8'; Asensi 41'; Rexach 51' , 59'; Perez 53'	Report	Quini 5'	Stadium: Camp Nou

9 December 1973 13	FC Barcelona	4-0	CD Málaga	Barcelona
	Marsial 33', 39'; Rexach 66'; Cruyff 85'	Report		Stadium: Camp Nou

16 December 1973 14	Real Oviedo	1-3	FC Barcelona	Oviedo
	Galan 37'	Report	Sotil 22'; Cruyff 31'; Rexach 71'	Stadium: Carlos Tartiere

22 December 1973 15	FC Barcelona	2-1	Atletico Madrid	Barcelona
	Cruyff 44'; Rexach 56'	Report	Garate 63'	Stadium: Camp Nou

30 December 1973 16	Valencia CF	0-2	FC Barcelona	Valencia
		Report	Cruyff 60', 80'	Stadium: Mestalla

6 January 1974 17	FC Barcelona	3-0	UD Las Palmas	Barcelona
	Cruyff 44', 68'; Juanito 87'	Report		Stadium: Camp Nou

13 January 1974 18	FC Barcelona	2-0	Elche CF	Barcelona
	Marsial 52'; Cruyff 82'	Report		Stadium: Camp Nou

20 January 1974 19	Racing Santander	1-3	FC Barcelona	Santander
	Genyupi Goal 28′ ( pen. )	Report	Perez 19'; Marsial 42'; Sotil 62'	Stadium: El Sardinero

27 January 1974 20	FC Barcelona	5-2	Celta de Vigo	Barcelona
	Gallego 21'; Marsial 30'; Cruyff 31'; Rexach 59' (pen.); Asensi 65'	Report	Villars 64'; Doblas 79'	Stadium: Camp Nou

3 February 1974 21	RCD Español	0-0	FC Barcelona	Barcelona
		Report		Stadium: Sarrià

17 February 1974 22	Real Madrid	0-5	FC Barcelona	Madrid
		Report	Asensi 30', 54'; Cruyff 39'; Perez 65'; Sotil 69'	Stadium: Santiago Bernabeu

27 February 1974 23	FC Barcelona	4-1	Real Sociedad	Barcelona
	Cruyff 57', 75'; Perez 70'; Asensi 88'	Report	Gaztelu 86'	Stadium: Camp Nou

3 March 1974 24	FC Barcelona	5-0	CD Castellon	Barcelona
	Reshak 31' (pen.), 41'; Cruyff 35'; Sotil 53'; Marsial 59'	Report		Stadium: Camp Nou

10 March 1974 25	Granada CF	1-1	FC Barcelona	Granada
	Kiles 7'	Report	Perez 50'

17 March 1974 26	FC Barcelona	1-0	Real Murcia	Barcelona
	Asensi 5'	Report		Stadium: Camp Nou

24 March 1974 27	Athletic Bilbao	0-0	FC Barcelona	Bilbao
		Report		Stadium: San Mamés

31 March 1974 28	FC Barcelona	2-0	Real Zaragoza	Barcelona
	Asensi 14' , 49'	Report		Stadium: Camp Nou

7 April 1974 29	Sporting Gijón	2-4	FC Barcelona	Gijón
	Ciriaco 48' (pen.); Leal 58'	Report	Rexach 36'; Marsial 75', 79', 87'	Stadium: El Molinón

14 April 1974 30	CD Málaga	0-0	FC Barcelona	Málaga
		Report		Stadium: La Rosaleda

21 April 1974 31	FC Barcelona	6-2	Real Oviedo	Barcelona
	Gallego 10'; Sotil 12' , 17' , 52'; Asensi 44'; Martial 58'	Report	Uria 15' Marian 21'	Stadium: Camp Nou

28 April 1974 32	Atletico Madrid	2-0	FC Barcelona	Madrid
	Louis 85' (pen.) Heredia 85'	Report		Stadium: Vicente Calderón

5 May 1974 33	FC Barcelona	1-0	Valencia CF	Barcelona
	Asensi 66'	Report		Stadium: Camp Nou

11 May 1974 34	UD Las Palmas	1-0	FC Barcelona	Las Palmas
	Trona 87'	Report		Stadium: Estadio Insular

=== UEFA Cup ===
==== First round ====
19 September 1973	OGC Nice	3-0	FC Barcelona	Nice

3 October 1973	FC Barcelona	2-0	OGC Nice	Barcelona

=== Copa Generalisimo ===
==== Eightfinals ====
26 May 1974	Real Oviedo	2-3	FC Barcelona	Oviedo
		Report		Stadium: Carlos Tartiere

3 June 1974	FC Barcelona	4-1	Real Oviedo	Barcelona
		Report		Stadium: Camp Nou

==== Quarterfinals ====
8 June 1974	RCD Español	1-1	FC Barcelona	Barcelona
		Report		Stadium: Camp Nou

12 June 1974	FC Barcelona	2-0	RCD Español	Barcelona
		Report		Stadium: Sarriá

==== Semifinals ====
16 June 1974	FC Barcelona	1-1	Atletico Madrid	Barcelona
		Report

24 June 1974	Atletico Madrid	1-2	FC Barcelona	Madrid
		Report		Stadium: Vicente Calderon

==== Final ====
29 June 1974	Real Madrid	4-0	FC Barcelona	Madrid
		Report		Stadium: Vicente Calderon

== Statistics ==
=== Players statistics ===
No.	Pos	Nat	Player	Total		La Liga		UEFA Cup		Copa del Rey	
No.	Pos	Nat	Player	Apps	Goals	Apps	Goals	Apps	Goals	Apps	Goals
	GK	(Spain) ESP	Sadurní	39	-35	30	-22	2	-3	7	-10
	DF	(Spain) ESP	Rifé	40	0	32	0	1	0	7	0
	DF	(Spain) ESP	Torres	38	0	31	0	2	0	5	0
	DF	(Spain) ESP	De la Cruz	43	2	34	2	2	0	7	0
	DF	(Spain) ESP	Quique Costas	39	0	31	0	2	0	6	0
	MF	(Spain) ESP	Juan Carlos	43	8	34	6	2	0	7	2
	MF	(Spain) ESP	Marcial	41	17	31+1	17	2	0	7	0
	MF	(Spain) ESP	Asensi	43	14	34	11	2	0	7	3
	FW	(Spain) ESP	Rexach	35	9	26+2	9	0	0	7	0
	FW	(Peru) PER	Sotil	36	12	34	11	2	1	0	0
	FW	(Netherlands) NED	Cruijff	26	16	26	16	0	0	0	0
	GK	(Spain) ESP	Mora	4	-2	4	-2	0	-0	0	-0
	DF	(Spain) ESP	Gallego	31	2	15+7	2	2	0	7	0
	FW	(Spain) ESP	Juanito	22	3	9+8	1	2+0	1	2+1	1
	FW	(Argentina) ARG	Cos	5	0	2+2	0	0+1	0	0	0
	DF	(Spain) ESP	Migueli	1	0	1	0	0	0	0	0
	DF	(Spain) ESP	Laredo	2	0	0+2	0	0	0	0	0
	DF	(Spain) ESP	Tomé	12	0	0+9	0	0	0	1+2	0
	MF	(Spain) ESP	Filosia	4	0	0+1	0	0+1	0	0+2	0
	MF	(Spain) ESP	Carreño	5	0	0+3	0	1	0	0+1	0
	FW	(Spain) ESP	Pérez	1	0	0+1	0	0	0	0	0
	FW	(Spain) ESP	Clares	7	5	0	0	0	0	7	5
	FW	(Spain) ESP	Barrios	4	0	0+3	0	0+1	0	0	0
	FW	(Spain) ESP	Pujol								
	DF	(Spain) ESP	Zabalza								
	GK	(Spain) ESP	Capó								
	FW	(Bolivia) BOL	Aicart								
	FW	(Spain) ESP	Rodri								
