= 1972–73 FC Barcelona season =

74th season in existence of FC Barcelona

FC Barcelona
1972–73 season
- President: Agustí Montal Costa
- Manager: Rinus Michels
- La Liga: Second
- Copa del Generalísimo: Round of 16
- UEFA Cup: First round
- Joan Gamper Trophy: Third

The 1972–73 season was the 74th season for FC Barcelona.

== Squad ==
Note: Flags indicate national team as defined under FIFA eligibility rules; some limited exceptions apply. Players may hold more than one non-FIFA nationality.

No.	Pos.	Nation	Player
—	GK	(Spain) ESP	Miguel Reina
—	GK	(Spain) ESP	Salvador Sadurní
—	DF	(Spain) ESP	Joaquim Rifé
—	DF	(Spain) ESP	Antonio de la Cruz
—	DF	(Spain) ESP	Antoni Torres
—	DF	(Spain) ESP	Gallego
—	DF	(Spain) ESP	José María Laredo
—	DF	(Spain) ESP	Cortés
—	DF	(Spain) ESP	Quique Costas
—	MF	(Spain) ESP	Juan Manuel Asensi
—	MF	(Spain) ESP	Juan Carlos

No.	Pos.	Nation	Player
—	MF	(Spain) ESP	Marcial
—	MF	(Spain) ESP	Narcís Martí Filosia
—	MF	(Spain) ESP	Pedro María Zabalza
—	FW	(Spain) ESP	José Antonio Barrios Olivero
—	FW	(Spain) ESP	Carles Rexach
—	FW	(Spain) ESP	José María Pérez Boixaderas
—	FW	(Spain) ESP	Juanito Díaz
—	FW	(Spain) ESP	Lluís Pujol
—	FW	(Spain) ESP	Ramón Alfonseda
—	FW	(Argentina) ARG	Bernardo Cos

== La Liga ==
=== League table ===
Pos	Team	Pld	W	D	L	GF	GA	GD	Pts	Qualification or relegation
1	Atlético Madrid (C)	34	20	8	6	49	29	+20	48	Qualification for the European Cup first round
2	Barcelona	34	18	10	6	41	21	+20	46	Qualification for the UEFA Cup first round
3	Español	34	17	11	6	48	27	+21	45	Qualification for the UEFA Cup first round
4	Real Madrid	34	17	9	8	45	29	+16	43	Qualification for the UEFA Cup first round
5	Castellón	34	13	9	12	44	38	+6	35	

Source: BDFútbol
Rules for classification: 1) Points; 2) Head-to-head results; 3) Goal difference; 4) Number of goals scored
(C) Champions

== Results ==
GAMES
06-08-72 . FRIENDLY OLOT-BARCELONA 0-2

12-08-72 . COSTA BRAVA TROPHY GIRONA-BARCELONA 1-3

13-08-72 . COSTA BRAVA TROPHY BARCELONA-NIMES 3-0

19-08-72 . FRIENDLY GRANOLLERS-BARCELONA 0-2

22-08-72 . Joan Gamper Trophy BARCELONA-C.S.K.A. SOFIA 0-2

23-08-72 . Joan Gamper Trophy BARCELONA-VASCO DA GAMA 0-0 /5-4/ PENALTY

26-08-72 . FRIENDLY EUROPA-BARCELONA 0-1

30-08-72 . FRIENDLY BARCELONA-FERENCVAROS 2-2

03-09-72 . LIGA BARCELONA-DEPORTIVO LA CORUNA 3-1

09-09-72 . LIGA VALENCIA-BARCELONA 0-1

16-09-72 . LIGA BARCELONA-OVIEDO 3-1

20-09-72 . UEFA Cup PORTO-BARCELONA 3-1

24-09-72 . LIGA BETIS-BARCELONA 0-2

27-09-72 . UEFA Cup BARCELONA-PORTO 0-1

01-10-72 . LIGA BARCELONA-REAL MADRID 1-0

07-10-72 . LIGA ESPANYOL-BARCELONA 1-1

18-10-72 . FRIENDLY SANT ANDREU-BARCELONA 1-2

22-10-72 . LIGA BARCELONA-ATHLETIC BILBAO 1-0

29-10-72 . LIGA REAL SOCIEDAD-BARCELONA 2-0

05-11-72 . LIGA BARCELONA-MALAGA 0-0

12-11-72 . LIGA CELTA VIGO-BARCELONA 0-0

19-11-72 . LIGA BARCELONA-CASTELLON 3-1

26-11-72 . LIGA SPORTING GIJON-BARCELONA 1-1

03-12-72 . LIGA BARCELONA-LAS PALMAS 3-1

10-12-72 . LIGA ATLETICO MADRID-BARCELONA 2-0

17-12-72 . LIGA BURGOS-BARCELONA 0-0

31-12-72 . LIGA BARCELONA-GRANADA 3-0

07-01-73 . LIGA ZARAGOZA-BARCELONA 0-2

14-01-73 . FRIENDLY BARCELONA-EINTRACH FRANKFURT 1-0

21-01-73 . LIGA DEPORTIVO LA CORUNA-BARCELONA 0-1

28-01-73 . LIGA BARCELONA-VALENCIA 0-0

04-02-73 . LIGA OVIEDO-BARCELONA 0-0

11-02-73 . LIGA BARCELONA-BETIS 2-0

18-02-73 . FRIENDLY BARCELONA-SPARTA 0-1

25-02-73 . LIGA REAL MADRID-BARCELONA 0-0

04-03-73 . LIGA BARCELONA-ESPANYOL 0-1

11-03-73 . LIGA ATHLETIC BILBAO-BARCELONA 0-1

18-03-73 . LIGA BARCELONA-REAL SOCIEDAD 1-0

25-03-73 . LIGA MALAGA-BARCELONA 2-1

28-03-73 . COPA GENERALISIMO RECREATIVO-BARCELONA 0-0

01-04-73 . LIGA BARCELONA-CELTA DE VIGO 2-0

08-04-73 . LIGA CASTELLON-BARCELONA 4-0

15-04-73 . LIGA BARCELONA-SPORTING GIJON 3-1

18-04-73 . COPA GENERALISIMO BARCELONA-RECREATIVO 2-0

22-04-73 . LIGA LAS PALMAS-BARCELONA 2-1

28-04-73 . LIGA BARCELONA-ATLETICO MADRID 0-0

01-05-73 . FRIENDLY BADALONA-BARCELONA 2-5

06-05-73 . LIGA BARCELONA-BURGOS 2-0

13-05-73 . LIGA GRANADA-BARCELONA 0-2

20-05-73 . LIGA BARCELONA-ZARAGOZA 1-1

31-05-73 . COPA GENERALISIMO SEVILLA-BARCELONA 3-1

03-06-73 . COPA GENERALISIMO BARCELONA-SEVILLA 1-0
