= 1974–75 FC Barcelona season =

76th season in existence of FC Barcelona

FC Barcelona
1974–75 season
- President: Agustí Montal Costa
- Manager: Rinus Michels
- La Liga: 3rd
- Copa del Generalísimo: Quarter-final
- European Cup: Semi-final
- Joan Gamper Trophy: Winners
Home colours	Away colours

The 1974–75 season was the 76th season for FC Barcelona.

== Squad ==
Note: Flags indicate national team as defined under FIFA eligibility rules; some limited exceptions apply. Players may hold more than one non-FIFA nationality.

No.	Pos.	Nation	Player
—	GK	ESP	Salvador Sadurní
—	GK	ESP	Pere Valentí Mora
—	GK	ESP	Aurelio Corral
—	GK	ESP	Joan Capó
—	DF	ESP	Jesús Antonio de la Cruz
—	DF	ESP	Migueli
—	DF	ESP	Quique Costas
—	DF	ESP	Joaquim Rifé
—	DF	BRA	Marinho Peres
—	DF	ESP	Gallego
—	DF	ESP	Antoni Torres
—	DF	ESP	José Joaquín Albaladejo
—	DF	ESP	Manuel Tomé
—	DF	ESP	Alfonso Cortés
—	MF	NED	Johan Neeskens

No.	Pos.	Nation	Player
—	MF	ESP	Juan Manuel Asensi
—	MF	ESP	Marcial Pina
—	MF	ESP	Juan Carlos Pérez
—	MF	ESP	Narcís Martí Filosia
—	MF	ESP	José Cirilo Macizo
—	FW	NED	Johan Cruyff
—	FW	ESP	Carles Rexach
—	FW	ESP	Manuel Clares
—	FW	ARG	Juan Carlos Heredia
—	FW	PER	Hugo Sotil
—	FW	ARG	Bernardo Cos
—	FW	ESP	Josep Maria Pérez
—	FW	ESP	Juan Díaz Juanito
—	FW	ESP	Rusky
—	FW	PER	Pedro Aicart

== Results ==
=== Friendlies ===
03 August 1974	Hercules CF	0-4	FC Barcelona	Alicante
				Stadium: Jose Rico Perez

07 August 1974	Hamburger SV (West Germany)	3-2	(Spain) FC Barcelona	Hamburg

13 August 1974 Teresa Herrera Trophy	Peñarol (Uruguay)	1-0	(Spain) FC Barcelona	La Coruña
				Stadium: Riazor

14 August 1974 Teresa Herrera Trophy	Atlético Madrid	2-2 (4-5 p)	FC Barcelona	La Coruña
				Stadium: Riazor

20 August 1974 Joan Gamper Trophy	FC Barcelona (Spain)	3-0	(Netherlands) AFC Ajax	Barcelona
				Stadium: Camp Nou

21 August 1974 Joan Gamper Trophy	FC Barcelona (Spain)	4-1	(Scotland) Glasgow Rangers	Barcelona
				Stadium: Camp Nou

25 August 1974 Trofeo Ciudad de Palma	FC Barcelona (Spain)	3-2	FK Austria Wien	Palma
				Stadium: Son Moix

26 August 1974 Trofeo Ciudad de Palma	FC Barcelona (Spain)	2-1	(Poland) Stal Mielec	Palma
				Stadium: Son Moix

31 August 1974 Ramón de Carranza Trophy	SE Palmeiras (Brazil)	2-0	(Spain) FC Barcelona	Cádiz

01 September 1974 Ramón de Carranza Trophy	FC Barcelona (Spain)	4-1	(Brazil) Santos FC	Cádiz

09 October 1974	Reims and PSG (France)	1-5	(Spain) FC Barcelona	Paris
				Stadium: Parc des Princes

15 October 1974	FC Barcelona (Spain)	1-1	(West Germany) MSV Duisburg	Barcelona
				Stadium: Camp Nou

12 November 1974 75 Anniversary	FC Barcelona (Spain)	3-2	(England) Manchester City F.C.	Barcelona
				Stadium: Camp Nou

27 November 1974 75 Anniversary	FC Barcelona (Spain)	2-1	(East Germany) DDR	Barcelona
				Stadium: Camp Nou

=== Primera Division ===
==== League table ====
Pos	Team	Pld	W	D	L	GF	GA	GD	Pts	Qualification or relegation
1	Real Madrid (C)	34	20	10	4	66	34	+32	50	Qualification for the European Cup first round
2	Zaragoza	34	15	8	11	58	47	+11	38	Qualification for the UEFA Cup first round
3	Barcelona	34	15	7	12	57	36	+21	37	Qualification for the UEFA Cup first round
4	Real Sociedad	34	12	12	10	37	32	+5	36	Qualification for the UEFA Cup first round
5	Hércules	34	11	14	9	37	36	+1	36	

Source: BDFútbol
Rules for classification: 1) Points; 2) Head-to-head results; 3) Goal difference; 4) Number of goals scored
(C) Champions

==== Position by round ====
Round	1	2	3	4	5	6	7	8	9	10	11	12	13	14	15	16	17	18	19	20	21	22	23	24	25	26	27	28	29	30	31	32	33	34
Ground	H	A	H	A	H	A	A	H	A	H	A	H	A	H	A	H	A	A	H	A	H	A	H	H	A	H	A	H	A	H	A	H	A	H
Result	L	W	W	W	D	W	D	W	L	W	L	W	L	W	L	D	L	W	L	D	L	D	L	W	L	W	L	W	W	D	W	D	L	W
Position	12	6	3	3	3	2	3	2	3	2	2	2	3	2	3	2	3	3	3	4	5	5	6	4	6	4	4	4	4	3	3	3	3	3

Source: www.lfp.es
A = Away; H = Home; W = Win; D = Draw; L = Loss; = 1975–76 European Cup; = 1975–76 UEFA Cup; = 1975–76 Segunda Division

==== Matches ====
07 September 1974 1	Real Sociedad	3-2	FC Barcelona	San Sebastián
				Stadium: Atotxa

14 September 1974 2	FC Barcelona	5-0	CD Málaga	Barcelona
				Stadium: Camp Nou

29 September 1974 3	Sporting de Gijón	0-1	FC Barcelona	Gijón
				Stadium: El Molinon

06 October 1974 4	FC Barcelona	5-2	Valencia CF	Barcelona
				Stadium: Camp Nou

19 October 1974 5	Hercules CF	0-0	FC Barcelona	Alicante
				Stadium: Jose Rico Perez

27 October 1974 6	FC Barcelona	3-1	UD Salamanca	Barcelona
				Stadium: Camp Nou

01 November 1974 7	Atlético Madrid	3-3	FC Barcelona	Madrid
				Stadium: Vicente Calderon

10 November 1974 8	FC Barcelona	3-2	UD Las Palmas	Barcelona
				Stadium: Camp Nou

24 November 1974 9	Español	5-2	FC Barcelona	Barcelona
				Stadium: Sarriá

01 December 1974 10	FC Barcelona	4-0	Celta Vigo	Barcelona
				Stadium: Camp Nou

08 December 1974 11	Real Betis	1-0	FC Barcelona	Seville
				Stadium: Benito Villamarin

15 December 1974 12	FC Barcelona	2-1	Granada CF	Barcelona
				Stadium: Camp Nou

22 December 1974 13	Elche CF	1-0	FC Barcelona	Elche

29 December 1974 14	FC Barcelona	3-1	Real Murcia	Barcelona
				Stadium: Camp Nou

05 January 1975 15	Real Madrid	1-0	FC Barcelona	Madrid
				Stadium: Santiago Bernabeu

12 January 1975 16	FC Barcelona	2-2	Real Zaragoza	Barcelona
				Stadium: Camp Nou

19 January 1975 17	Athletic Bilbao	1-0	FC Barcelona	Bilbao
				Stadium: San Mamés

26 January 1975 18	FC Barcelona	2-0	Real Sociedad	Barcelona
				Stadium: Camp Nou

09 February 1975 19	CD Málaga	3-2	FC Barcelona	Málaga
				Stadium: La Rosaleda

16 February 1975 20	FC Barcelona	1-1	Sporting de Gijón	Barcelona
				Stadium: Camp Nou

23 February 1975 21	Valencia CF	1-0	FC Barcelona	Valencia
				Stadium: Luis Casanova

01 March 1975 22	FC Barcelona	0-0	Hercules CF	Barcelona
				Stadium: Camp Nou

09 March 1975 23	UD Salamanca	1-0	FC Barcelona	Villares de la Reina
				Stadium: El Helmántico

16 March 1975 24	FC Barcelona	1-0	Atlético Madrid	Barcelona
				Stadium: Camp Nou

22 March 1975 25	UD Las Palmas	1-0	FC Barcelona	Las Palmas
				Stadium: Insular

30 March 1975 26	FC Barcelona	4-1	Español	Barcelona
				Stadium: Camp Nou

06 April 1975 27	Celta Vigo	1-0	FC Barcelona	Vigo
				Stadium: Balaidos

19 April 1975 28	FC Barcelona	3-0	Real Betis	Barcelona
				Stadium: Camp Nou

27 April 1975 29	Granada CF	1-2	FC Barcelona	Granada

30 April 1975 30	FC Barcelona	0-0	Elche CF	Barcelona
				Stadium: Camp Nou

04 May 1975 31	Real Murcia	0-2	FC Barcelona	Murcia

11 May 1975 32	FC Barcelona	0-0	Real Madrid	Barcelona
				Stadium: Camp Nou

18 May 1975 33	Real Zaragoza	2-1	FC Barcelona	Zaragoza
				Stadium: La Romareda

25 May 1975 34	FC Barcelona	4-0	Athletic Bilbao	Barcelona
				Stadium: Camp Nou

=== Copa del Generalisimo ===
==== Eightfinals ====
31 May 1975 1	UE Sant Andreu	1-2	FC Barcelona

04 June 1975 2	FC Barcelona	1-0	UE Sant Andreu	Barcelona
				Stadium: Camp Nou

==== Quarterfinals ====
08 June 1975 1	FC Barcelona	0-0	Real Zaragoza	Barcelona
				Stadium: Camp Nou

14 June 1975 2	Real Zaragoza	1-0	FC Barcelona	Zaragoza
				Stadium: La Romareda

=== European Cup ===
==== First round ====
18 September 1974 1	FC Linz (Austria)	0-0	(Spain) FC Barcelona	Linz

02 October 1974 2	FC Barcelona (Spain)	5-0	(Austria) FC Linz	Barcelona
				Stadium: Camp Nou

==== Eightfinals ====
22 October 1974 1	Feyenoord (Netherlands)	0-0	(Spain) FC Barcelona	Rotterdam

05 November 1974 2	FC Barcelona (Spain)	3-0	(Netherlands) Feyenoord	Barcelona
				Stadium: Camp Nou

==== Quarterfinals ====
04 March 1975 1	FC Barcelona (Spain)	2-0	(Sweden) Atvidabergs FF	Barcelona
				Stadium: Camp Nou

11 March 1975 2	Atvidabergs FF (Sweden)	0-3	(Spain) FC Barcelona	Åtvidaberg
				Stadium: Kopparvallen

==== Semifinals ====
9 April 1975 1	Leeds United (England)	2–1	(Spain) FC Barcelona	Leeds
	Bremner 9'; Clarke 78'	Report	66' Asensi	Stadium: Elland Road; Attendance: 50,393; Referee: (Belgium) Vital Loraux

23 April 1975 2	FC Barcelona (Spain)	1–1	(England) Leeds United	Barcelona
	Clares 69'	Report	7' Lorimer	Stadium: Camp Nou; Attendance: 100,000; Referee: (Austria) Erich Linemayr

== Statistics ==
=== Player statistics ===
No.	Pos	Nat	Player	Total		Primera Division		European Cup		Copa	
No.	Pos	Nat	Player	Apps	Goals	Apps	Goals	Apps	Goals	Apps	Goals
1	GK	(Spain) ESP	Salvador Sadurní	33	-24	24	-19	4+1	-3	4	-2
2	DF	(Spain) ESP	Joaquim Rifé	39	0	24+3	0	6+2	0	4	0
4	DF	(Spain) ESP	Migueli	39	2	28+1	2	6	0	4	0
5	DF	(Spain) ESP	Antonio de la Cruz	38	2	29	2	8	0	1	0
4	DF	(Spain) ESP	Quique Costas	29	1	24	1	5	0	0	0
6	MF	(Netherlands) NED	Johan Neeskens	34	8	27	7	7	1	0	0
10	MF	(Spain) ESP	Juan Manuel Asensi	38	8	26+1	5	7	3	4	0
11	MF	(Spain) ESP	Marcial Pina	27	7	21	6	2	0	4	1
7	FW	(Spain) ESP	Carles Rexach	39	10	30+1	6	7	4	1	0
9	FW	(Netherlands) NED	Johan Cruyff	38	7	30	7	8	0	0	0
11	FW	(Spain) ESP	Manuel Clares	40	16	27+2	10	6+1	4	4	2
13	GK	(Spain) ESP	Pere Valentí Mora	14	-17	10	-17	4	-0	0	-0
3	DF	(Brazil) BRA	Marinho Peres	25	4	17	3	4	1	4	0
8	MF	(Spain) ESP	Juan Carlos Pérez	37	3	16+11	2	4+2	1	4	0
3	DF	(Spain) ESP	Antoni Torres	19	0	13+2	0	4	0	0	0
11	FW	(Argentina) ARG	Juan Carlos Heredia	13	1	8+1	1	2	0	2	0
12	DF	(Spain) ESP	Gallego	22	1	9+7	0	4+2	1	0	0
15	DF	(Spain) ESP	José Joaquín Albaladejo	9	0	4	0	0+1	0	4	0
	FW	(Spain) ESP	Cuchi Cos	11	1	2+6	1	0	0	3	0
	FW	(Spain) ESP	Josep Maria Pérez	4	0	2+1	0	0	0	0+1	0
	MF	(Spain) ESP	Narcís Martí Filosia	4	0	2+2	0	0	0	0	0
	DF	(Spain) ESP	Manuel Tome	6	0	1+2	0	0	0	3	0
	MF	(Spain) ESP	José Cirilo Macizo	4	0	0+4	0	0	0	0	0
	FW	(Spain) ESP	Rusky	3	0	0	0	0	0	2+1	0
	FW	(Peru) PER	Hugo Sotil								
	FW	(Bolivia) BOL	Pedro Arcaida								
