= 1975–76 FC Barcelona season =

77th season in existence of FC Barcelona

FC Barcelona
1975–76 season
- President: Agustí Montal Costa
- Manager: Hennes Weisweiler (until 2 April 1976); Laureano Ruiz (until 9 May 1976); Rinus Michels
- La Liga: 2nd
- Copa del Generalísimo: Quarter-final
- UEFA Cup: Semi-final
- Joan Gamper Trophy: Winners
Home colours	Away colours

The 1975–76 season was the 77th season for FC Barcelona.

== Squad ==
Note: Flags indicate national team as defined under FIFA eligibility rules; some limited exceptions apply. Players may hold more than one non-FIFA nationality.

No.	Pos.	Nation	Player
—	GK	ESP	Pere Valentí Mora
—	GK	ESP	Pedro María Artola
—	GK	ESP	Salvador Sadurní
—	DF	ESP	Migueli
—	DF	ESP	Quique Costas
—	DF	ESP	Jesús Antonio de la Cruz
—	DF	ESP	Miquel Corominas
—	DF	ESP	José Joaquín Albaladejo
—	DF	ESP	Joaquim Rifé
—	DF	ESP	Antoni Torres
—	DF	BRA	Marinho Peres
—	MF	ESP	Marcial Pina
—	MF	ESP	Manuel Tomé

No.	Pos.	Nation	Player
—	MF	NED	Johan Neeskens
—	MF	ESP	Juan Manuel Asensi
—	MF	ESP	Tente Sánchez
—	MF	ESP	Jordi Carreño
—	MF	ESP	Carles Rexach
—	FW	NED	Johan Cruyff
—	FW	ESP	Paco Fortes
—	FW	PER	Hugo Sotil
—	FW	ARG	Juan Carlos Heredia
—	FW	ESP	Miquel Mir
—	FW	ESP	Manuel Clares
—	FW	ARG	Bernardo Cos

== Results ==
=== Friendlies ===
24-04-76 . FRIENDLY	FIGUERES -	2-9	FC Barcelona

27-05-76 . FRIENDLY	JUPITER-	0-3	FC Barcelona

16-06-76 . FRIENDLY	VIC	0-4	FC Barcelona

18-06-76 . FRIENDLY	Granollers	1-4	FC Barcelona

02-08-75 . FRIENDLY	Hercules CF	0-1	FC Barcelona

AFC Ajax (Netherlands)	3-1	(Spain) FC Barcelona
			Referee: 08-08-75 . Amsterdam Tournament

10-08-75 . Amsterdam Tournament	Feyenoord (Netherlands)	1-1	(Spain) FC Barcelona

13-08-75 . FRIENDLY	Alemannia Aachen (West Germany)	1-1	(Spain) FC Barcelona

19-08-75 . FRIENDLY	Olympique Marseille (France)	3-1	(Spain) FC Barcelona

23-08-75 . FRIENDLY	Terrassa	2-4	FC Barcelona

26-08-75 . Joan Gamper Trophy	FC Barcelona (Spain)	3-2	(Netherlands) Ujpest FC

27-08-75 . Joan Gamper Trophy	FC Barcelona (Spain)	3-1	(Netherlands) Feyenoord

02-09-75 . Trofeu Ciutat d'Hospitalet	FC Barcelona Athletic-	0-7	FC Barcelona

29-10-75 . FRIENDLY	GIRONA-	3-2	FC Barcelona

13-11-75 . FRIENDLY	TERRASSA-	1-2	FC Barcelona

07-01-76 . FRIENDLY	KOLN-	1-1	FC Barcelona

=== Primera Division ===
==== League table ====
Pos	Team	Pld	W	D	L	GF	GA	GD	Pts	Qualification or relegation
1	Real Madrid (C)	34	20	8	6	54	26	+28	48	Qualification for the European Cup first round
2	Barcelona	34	18	7	9	61	41	+20	43	Qualification for the UEFA Cup first round
3	Atlético Madrid	34	18	6	10	60	38	+22	42	Qualification for the Cup Winners' Cup first round (Note: Atlético Madrid qualified to the Cup Winners' Cup as winners of the Copa del Generalísimo.)
4	Español	34	18	4	12	48	45	+3	40	Qualification for the UEFA Cup first round
5	Athletic Bilbao	34	14	11	9	43	38	+5	39	Qualification for the UEFA Cup first round

Source: BDFútbol
Rules for classification: 1) Points; 2) Head-to-head results; 3) Goal difference; 4) Number of goals scored
(C) Champions

==== Position by round ====
Round	1	2	3	4	5	6	7	8	9	10	11	12	13	14	15	16	17	18	19	20	21	22	23	24	25	26	27	28	29	30	31	32	33	34
Ground	H	A	H	A	H	A	A	H	A	H	A	H	A	H	A	H	A	A	H	A	H	A	H	H	A	H	A	H	A	H	A	H	A	H
Result	W	W	L	W	W	L	W	D	D	L	W	D	W	L	W	D	W	W	L	W	L	W	W	L	W	D	W	L	W	L	D	W	W	D
Position	5	1	5	2	2	2	2	2	2	5	3	4	3	4	4	3	3	2	3	3	3	3	3	3	3	3	3	3	3	3	3	3	3	2

Source: www.lfp.es
A = Away; H = Home; W = Win; D = Draw; L = Loss; = 1976–77 European Cup; = 1976–77 UEFA Cup; = 1976–77 Segunda Division

==== Matches ====
07 September 1975 1	Elche CF	2-3	FC Barcelona	Elche
				Stadium: Campo de Altabix

13 September 1975 2	FC Barcelona	3-1	UD Salamanca	Barcelona
				Stadium: Camp Nou

21 September 1975 3	Athletic Bilbao	2-1	FC Barcelona	Bilbao
				Stadium: San Mamés

28 September 1975 4	FC Barcelona	2-0	Sevilla CF	Barcelona
				Stadium: Camp Nou

05 October 1975 5	FC Barcelona	3-0	Granada CF	Barcelona
				Stadium: Camp Nou

19 October 1975 6	Atletico Madrid	3-0	FC Barcelona	Madrid
				Stadium: Vicente Calderón

26 October 1975 7	FC Barcelona	2-1	Racing Santander	Barcelona
				Stadium: Camp Nou

02 November 1975 8	Real Oviedo	1-1	FC Barcelona	Oviedo
				Stadium: Carlos Tartiere

09 November 1975 9	FC Barcelona	1-1	Hercules CF	Barcelona
				Stadium: Camp Nou

23 November 1975 10	Real Betis	1-0	FC Barcelona	Seville
				Stadium: Benito Villamarín

30 November 1975 11	FC Barcelona	3-0	UD Las Palmas	Barcelona
				Stadium: Camp Nou

07 December 1975 12	Real Sociedad	2-2	FC Barcelona	San Sebastián
				Stadium: Atotxa

14 December 1975 13	FC Barcelona	5-0	Español	Barcelona
				Stadium: Camp Nou

21 December 1975 14	Valencia CF	3-2	FC Barcelona	Valencia
				Stadium: Mestalla

28 December 1975 15	FC Barcelona	2-1	Real Madrid	Barcelona
				Stadium: Camp Nou

04 January 1976 16	Real Zaragoza	4-4	FC Barcelona	Zaragoza
				Stadium: La Romareda

11 January 1976 17	FC Barcelona	5-1	Sporting Gijon	Barcelona
				Stadium: Camp Nou

18 January 1976 18	FC Barcelona	1-0	Elche CF	Barcelona
				Stadium: Camp Nou

25 January 1976 19	UD Salamanca	2-0	FC Barcelona	Villares de la Reina
				Stadium: Helmántico

01 February 1976 20	FC Barcelona	2-1	Athletic Bilbao	Barcelona
				Stadium: Camp Nou

08 February 1976 21	Sevilla CF	2-0	FC Barcelona	Seville
				Stadium: Sánchez Pizjuán

15 February 1976 22	Granada CF	0-2	FC Barcelona	Granada

22 February 1976 23	FC Barcelona	2-1	Atletico Madrid	Barcelona
				Stadium: Camp Nou

29 February 1976 24	Racing Santander	2-1	FC Barcelona	Santander
				Stadium: El Sardinero

07 March 1976 25	FC Barcelona	2-0	Real Oviedo	Barcelona
				Stadium: Camp Nou

14 March 1976 26	Hercules CF	0-0	FC Barcelona	Alicante
				Stadium: José Rico Pérez

21 March 1976 27	FC Barcelona	3-1	Real Betis	Barcelona
				Stadium: Camp Nou

27 March 1976 28	UD Las Palmas	3-1	FC Barcelona	Las Palmas
				Stadium: Insular

04 April 1976 29	FC Barcelona	2-0	Real Sociedad	Barcelona
				Stadium: Camp Nou

11 April 1976 30	Español	3-0	FC Barcelona	Barcelona
				Stadium: Sarrià

18 April 1976 31	FC Barcelona	1-1	Valencia CF	Barcelona
				Stadium: Camp Nou

30 April 1976 32	Real Madrid	0-2	FC Barcelona	Madrid
				Stadium: Santiago Bernabéu

09 May 1976 33	FC Barcelona	2-1	Real Zaragoza	Barcelona
				Stadium: Camp Nou

16 May 1976 34	Sporting Gijon	1-1	FC Barcelona	Gijón
				Stadium: El Molinón

=== UEFA Cup ===
==== First round ====
16 September 1975	PAOK (Greece)	1–0	(Spain) FC Barcelona	Thessaloniki
	Koudas 72'	Report		Stadium: Toumba Stadium; Attendance: 45,200; Referee: Nicolae Petriceanu (Romania)

1 October 1975	Barcelona (Spain)	6–1	(Greece) PAOK	Barcelona
	Neeskens 23' (pen.), 59' (pen.); Rexach 44', 64', 81'; Cruyff 54'	Report	Anastasiadis 77'	Stadium: Camp Nou; Attendance: 32,708; Referee: Jack Taylor (England)

==== Second round ====
22 October 1975	Lazio (Italy)	0–3	(Spain) Barcelona	Roma
		Report		Stadium: Olimpico
Note: Lazio refused to play for security reasons, claiming it would be impossible to play due to political demonstrations following the execution in Spain of five ETA and FRAP members on 27 September on terrorism charges. UEFA awarded Barcelona a 3–0 victory, ruling those three goals were not applicable for the away goals rule.

5 November 1975	Barcelona (Spain)	4–0	(Italy) Lazio	Barcelona
	Sotil 6'; Cruyff 43'; Neeskens 79'; Fortes 82'	Report		Stadium: Camp Nou; Attendance: 29,238; Referee: René Vigliani (France)

==== Eightfinals ====
26 November 1975	Barcelona (Spain)	3–1	(Hungary) Vasas	Barcelona
	Migueli 16'; Rexach 37'; Neeskens 39'	Report	Müller 26'	Stadium: Camp Nou; Attendance: 26,317; Referee: Clive Thomas (Wales)

10 December 1975	Vasas (Hungary)	0–1	(Spain) Barcelona	Budapest
		Report	Fortes 15'	Stadium: Népstadion; Attendance: 28,280; Referee: Alfred Delcourt (Belgium)

==== Quarter–finals ====
3 March 1976	Barcelona (Spain)	4–0	(Bulgaria) Levski-Spartak Sofia	Barcelona
	Neeskens 38'; Marcial 44'; Asensi 80'; Heredia 89'	Report		Stadium: Camp Nou; Attendance: 45,000; Referee: Jean Dubach (Switzerland)

17 March 1976	Levski-Spartak Sofia (Bulgaria)	5–4	(Spain) Barcelona	Sofia
	Panov 8', 89' (pen.); Yordanov 10', 87'; Spasov 48'	Report	Marcial 33'; Asensi 45'; Heredia 57'; Neeskens 64' (pen.)	Stadium: Vasil Levski National Stadium; Attendance: 55,000; Referee: Ken Burns (England)

==== Semi–finals ====
30 March 1976	Barcelona (Spain)	0–1	(England) Liverpool	Barcelona
		Report	Toshack 13'	Stadium: Camp Nou; Attendance: 49,572; Referee: Paul Schiller (Austria)

14 April 1976	Liverpool (England)	1–1	(Spain) Barcelona	Liverpool
	Thompson 51'	Report	Rexach 52'	Stadium: Anfield; Attendance: 55,102; Referee: Riccardo Lattanzi (Italy)

=== Copa del Rey ===
==== Round of 32 ====
11 February 1976 1	UD Salamanca	1-0	FC Barcelona	Villares de la Reina
				Stadium: Helmántico

25 February 1976 2	FC Barcelona	3-1	UD Salamanca	Barcelona
				Stadium: Camp Nou

==== Eightfinals ====
09 March 1976 1	Real Oviedo	0-0	FC Barcelona	Oviedo
				Stadium: Carlos Tartiere

07 April 1976 2	FC Barcelona	4-0	Real Oviedo	Barcelona
				Stadium: Camp Nou

==== Quarterfinals ====
30 May 1976 1	FC Barcelona	2-3	Atletico Madrid	Barcelona
				Stadium: Camp Nou

06 June 1976 2	Atletico Madrid	1-1	FC Barcelona	Madrid
				Stadium: Vicente Calderón

== Statistics ==
=== Player statistics ===
No.	Pos	Nat	Player	Total		Primera Division		UEFA		Copa	
No.	Pos	Nat	Player	Apps	Goals	Apps	Goals	Apps	Goals	Apps	Goals
	GK	(Spain) ESP	Pere Valentí Mora	33	-39	18	-23	9	-10	6	-6
	DF	(Spain) ESP	Migueli	48	6	34	5	9	1	5	0
	DF	(Spain) ESP	Quique Costas	36	0	24+1	0	5	0	6	0
	DF	(Spain) ESP	Jesús Antonio de la Cruz	34	0	23+1	0	5+1	0	3+1	0
	MF	(Netherlands) NED	Johan Neeskens	41	18	32	12	9	6	0	0
	MF	(Spain) ESP	Marcial Pina	47	10	32	6	9	2	6	2
	MF	(Spain) ESP	Carles Rexach	46	13	32	6	8	5	6	2
	MF	(Spain) ESP	Manuel Tomé	35	0	21+1	0	6+2	0	5	0
	MF	(Spain) ESP	Juan Manuel Asensi	43	15	29	11	8	2	6	2
	FW	(Netherlands) NED	Johan Cruyff	38	8	29	6	9	2	0	0
	FW	(Spain) ESP	Paco Fortes	34	5	20+3	3	5+1	2	2+3	0
	GK	(Spain) ESP	Pedro María Artola	16	-18	16	-18	0	-0	0	-0
	FW	(Peru) PER	Hugo Sotil	26	5	16+3	3	4+1	1	2	1
	DF	(Spain) ESP	Miquel Corominas	25	0	14+3	0	4+1	0	3	0
	DF	(Spain) ESP	José Joaquín Albaladejo	15	0	9	0	3	0	3	0
	FW	(Argentina) ARG	Juan Carlos Heredia	20	5	8+3	2	2+3	2	4	1
	FW	(Spain) ESP	Miquel Mir	12	2	6+4	2	2	0	0	0
	FW	(Spain) ESP	Manuel Clares	13	3	3+5	1	0	0	4+1	2
	DF	(Spain) ESP	Joaquim Rifé	11	0	3+3	0	1+1	0	3	0
	MF	(Spain) ESP	Tente Sánchez	7	1	2+2	1	0	0	1+2	0
	DF	(Brazil) BRA	Marinho Peres	4	0	2+1	0	1	0	0	0
	DF	(Spain) ESP	Antoni Torres	1	0	1	0	0	0	0	0
	MF	(Spain) ESP	Jordi Carreño	2	0	0	0	0	0	1+1	0
	GK	(Spain) ESP	Salvador Sadurní								
	FW	(Spain) ESP	Bernardo Cos								
