= 1974 Copa del Generalísimo final =

Copa del Generalísimo 1974 final
- Event: 1973–74 Copa del Generalísimo
Real Madrid	Barcelona
4	0
- Date: 28 June 1974
- Venue: Vicente Calderón, Madrid
- Referee: Antonio Sánchez Ríos
- Attendance: 48,000

The Copa del Generalísimo 1974 final was the 72nd final of the King's Cup. It was played at Vicente Calderón Stadium in Madrid on 28 June 1974, with Real Madrid beating Barcelona 4–0 for their 12th title.

== Match details ==
28 June 1974
21:00 CET

Real Madrid	4–0	Barcelona
Santillana 5'; Rubiñán 46'; Aguilar 50'; Pirri 83'	Report (in Spanish)

Vicente Calderón Stadium, Madrid
Attendance: 48,000
Referee: Antonio Sánchez Ríos

Real Madrid

Barcelona

Real Madrid:
GK	1	(Spain) Miguel Ángel
DF	2	(Spain) José Luis		(substituted off) 84'
DF	3	(Spain) Pirri
DF	4	(Spain) Gregorio Benito	(yellow card) 51'
DF	5	(Spain) Benito Rubiñán
MF	6	(Spain) Vicente del Bosque	(yellow card) 71'
MF	7	(Spain) Manuel Velázquez
MF	8	(Spain) Ramón Grosso (c)		(substituted off) 84'
FW	9	(Spain) Francisco Aguilar
FW	10	(Spain) Santillana
FW	11	(Spain) José Macanás
Substitutes:
DF	12	(Spain) Juan Carlos Touriño		(substituted on) 84'
MF	14	(Spain) Ignacio Zoco		(substituted on) 84'
Manager:
(Spain) Luis Molowny

FC Barcelona:
GK	1	(Spain) Salvador Sadurní
DF	2	(Spain) Antonio de la Cruz
DF	3	(Spain) Gallego	(yellow card) 44'
DF	4	(Spain) Quique Costas	(yellow card) 40'
DF	5	(Spain) Joaquim Rifé
MF	6	(Spain) Juan Carlos (c)
MF	7	(Spain) Juan Manuel Asensi		(substituted off) 56'
MF	8	(Spain) Marcial
FW	9	(Spain) Carles Rexach
FW	10	(Spain) Manuel Clares
FW	11	(Spain) Juanito	(yellow card) 53'
Substitutes:
FW	12	(Spain) Narciso Martí Filosía		(substituted on) 56'
Manager:
(Spain) Rodri

== See also ==
- El Clásico
