= Joan Capó =

Spanish footballer (born 1954)

Personal information
- Full name: Joan Capó Coll
- Date of birth: 13 November 1954 (age 71)
- Place of birth: Ciutadella de Menorca, Balearic Islands, Spain
- Height: 1.74 m (5 ft 9 in)
- Position: Goalkeeper

Senior career*
Years	Team	Apps	(Gls)
1972–1973	Atlètic Ciutadella		
1973–1975	Barcelona	0	(0)
1975	Barcelona Atlètic	4	(0)
1976–1979	Sabadell	70	(0)
1979–1983	Celta de Vigo	73	(0)
1983–1990	Sabadell	157	(0)
Total		304	(0)
- * Club domestic league appearances and goals

Joan Capó Coll (born 13 November 1954) is a retired Spanish footballer. Sometimes referred to as simply Capó, he played for Sabadell and Celta de Vigo throughout his career through the 1970s and the 1980s as well as appearing as a substitute goalkeeper for Barcelona for two seasons.

== Career ==
Capó began his career with Atlètic de Ciutadella at only 17 years of age for the 1972–73 Tercera División. His performance would catch the interest of FC Barcelona as he would sign on for the following 1973–74 season. However, due to being a reserve goalkeeper behind Salvador Sadurni and Pere Valentí Mora, he would never gain the opportunity to play for Barcelona in an official match, instead only playing in friendlies, including playing a series of friendlies in the Netherlands as the club won the 1973–74 La Liga. During the 1974–75 season, he would be switched over to Barcelona Atlètic and with the following 1975–76 season having Pedro María Artola replace Capó, he would have a brief spell with Terrassa before switching over to play for Sabadell over the course of the next three seasons. For the 1979–80 season, Capó would catch the interest of Celta de Vigo but this debut season would see the club relegated for the 1980–81 Segunda División B despite Capó's best efforts. Despite Javier Maté showing up for the 1980–81 season and thus reducing his appearances for the club, the club would not only be promoted back to the Segunda División but would also be promoted to the 1982–83 La Liga and would spend his last season with the club playing for the top flight of Spanish football despite being relegated the same season. He spent the rest of his career with Sabadell once more in which he would see the club be promoted and relegated before his retirement in 1990. He was known for his physical and observational style of play on field, affectionately given the nickname of "the convertible goalkeeper" by fans of Vigo.

== Later life ==
Capó was later acknowledged by the Federació de Fútbol de les Isles Balears (FFIB) for his career and was recognized as being one of the most successful players to emerge from the archipelago.
