= Martí Filosia =

Spanish footballer

Personal information
- Full name: Narcís Martí Filosia
- Date of birth: 15 September 1945 (age 81)
- Place of birth: Palafrugell, Spain
- Height: 1.86 m (6 ft 1 in)
- Position: Attacking midfielder

Youth career
- Palafrugell
- Barcelona

Senior career*
| Years | Team | Apps | (Gls) |
| 1964–1966 | Condal | 28 | (16) |
| 1966–1975 | Barcelona | 89 | (16) |
| 1968 | → Condal (loan) | 3 | (3) |
| 1975–1977 | Sant Andreu | 66 | (13) |
| Total | | 186 | (48) |

International career
| 1964 | Spain U18 | 5 | (3) |
| 1965 | Spain amateur | 4 | (1) |
- * Club domestic league appearances and goals

Narcís Martí Filosia (born 15 September 1945) is a Spanish retired footballer who played as an attacking midfielder.

== Club career ==
Born in Palafrugell, Girona, Catalonia, Martí Filosia arrived at FC Barcelona in the 1966 summer, from neighbours CD Condal (he would later be loaned to the same club). He made his official debut on 16 October under Roque Olsen, playing the full 90 minutes in a 0–2 derby loss against RCD Español at the Sarrià Stadium; it was his only appearance of the season.

In the following eight La Liga campaigns, Martí Filosia played alongside the likes of Juan Manuel Asensi, Johan Cruyff, Carles Rexach, Salvador Sadurní or Hugo Sotil, being used mostly as an attacking backup and winning three major titles, notably the 1974 national championship. He retired in June 1977 after a couple of years in Segunda División with UE Sant Andreu, also in his native region.

== Honours ==
=== Club ===
Barcelona

- Inter-Cities Fairs Cup: 1965–66, 1971
- La Liga: 1973–74
- Copa del Generalísimo: 1967–68, 1970–71

=== Country ===
Spain U18

- UEFA European Under-18 Championship: Runner-up 1964
