= Ralph Gunesch =

German footballer

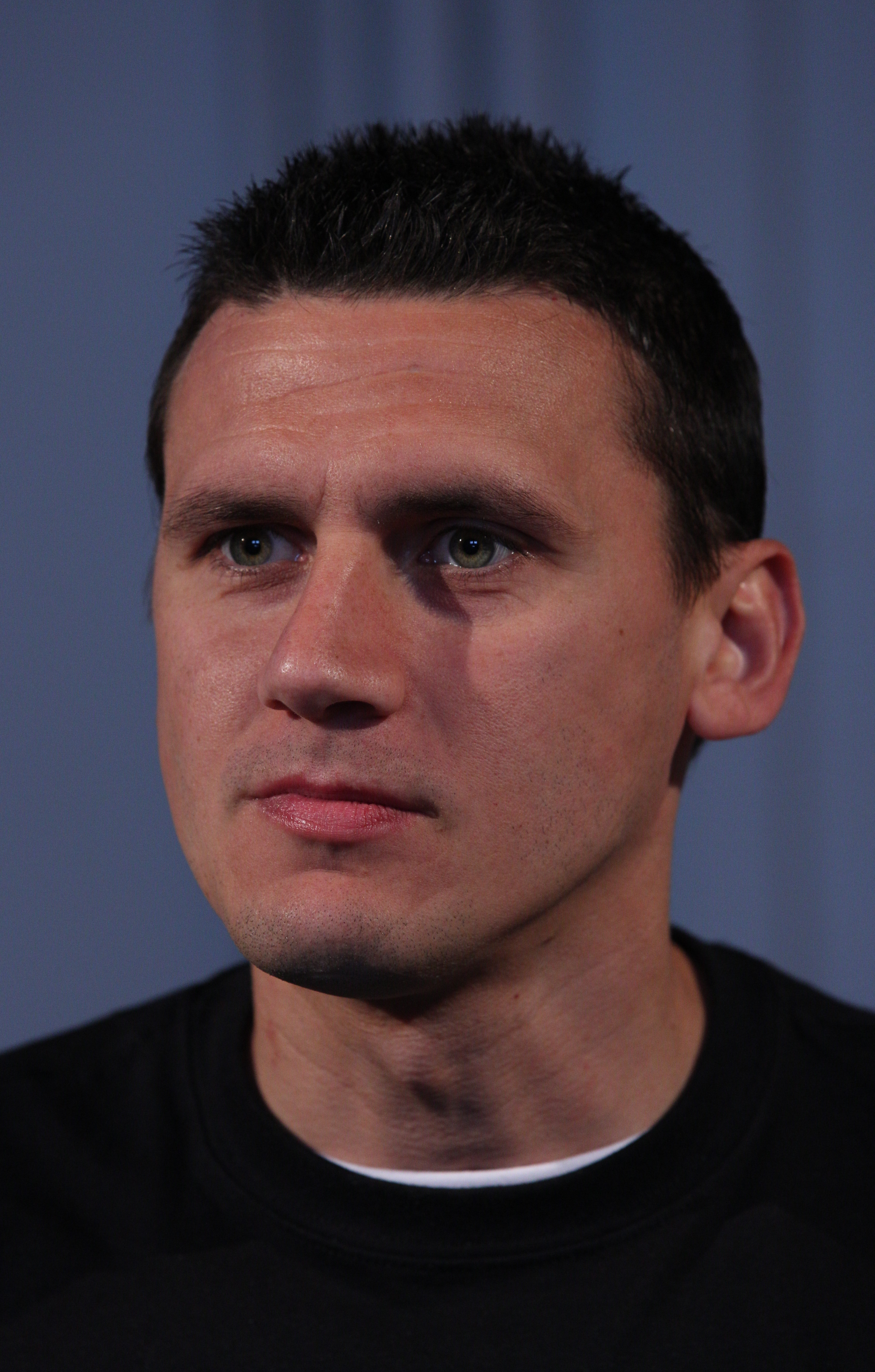
- Gunesch pictured in 2017

Personal information
- Date of birth: 2 September 1983 (age 43)
- Place of birth: Sighişoara, Romania
- Height: 1.90 m (6 ft 3 in)
- Position: Centre-back

Team information
- Current team: Eintracht Frankfurt (transition coach)

Youth career
- 1990–1994: SV 09 Baesweiler
- 1994–1997: SV Setterich
- 1997–1999: Germania Teveren
- 1999–2001: Alemannia Aachen

Senior career*
Years	Team	Apps	(Gls)
2001–2003	Alemannia Aachen	40	(1)
2003–2006	FC St. Pauli	84	(3)
2006–2007	Mainz 05	9	(0)
2007–2012	FC St. Pauli	106	(1)
2012–2015	FC Ingolstadt 04	50	(0)
2015	FC Ingolstadt 04 II	2	(0)
Total		291	(5)

International career
2001	Germany U19	2	(0)
2002	Germany U20	2	(0)

Managerial career
- 2018: FC Ingolstadt 04 II (assistant)
- * Club domestic league appearances and goals

Ralph Gunesch (born 2 September 1983) is a German former professional footballer who played as a centre-back.

== Career ==
Gunesch moved to Germany when he was very young. From 2001 to 2003 he played for Alemannia Aachen. In 2003, he was transferred to FC St. Pauli. During the summer of 2006 he moved to Bundesliga side Mainz 05, where he made his first league debut. In June 2007 he transferred back to FC St. Pauli.

Having joined FC Ingolstadt 04 in winter 2012 he left the club at the end of the 2014–15 season. He made 50 league appearances during his spell there.

== Personal life ==
Gunesch is of German heritage (more specifically Transylvanian Saxon), and one quarter Romanian through his maternal grandfather.

== Honours ==
FC Ingolstadt

- 2. Bundesliga: 2014–15
