= 1979 European Cup Winners' Cup final =

- Match programme cover
- Event: 1978–79 European Cup Winners' Cup
Fortuna Düsseldorf	Barcelona
(West Germany)	(Spain)
3	4
- After extra time
- Date: 16 May 1979
- Venue: St. Jakob Stadium, Basel
- Referee: Károly Palotai (Hungary)
- Attendance: 58,000

The 1979 European Cup Winners' Cup final was a football match contested between Fortuna Düsseldorf of West Germany and Barcelona of Spain. It was held at St. Jakob Stadium in Basel on 16 May 1979. The venue was decided in Bern by the UEFA Executive Committee on 27 September 1978. It was the final match of the 1978–79 European Cup Winners' Cup and the 19th European Cup Winners' Cup final. Barcelona won 4–3 after extra time after goals from Tente Sánchez, Juan Manuel Asensi, Carles Rexach, and Hans Krankl, conquering the first UEFA-sanctioned trophy in its history.

== Route to the final ==
(West Germany) Fortuna Düsseldorf					(Spain) Barcelona			
Opponent	Agg.	1st leg	2nd leg		Opponent	Agg.	1st leg	2nd leg
(Romania) Universitatea Craiova	5–4	4–3 (A)	1–1 (H)	First round	(Soviet Union) Shakhtyor Donetsk	4–1	3–0 (H)	1–1 (A)
(Scotland) Aberdeen	3–2	3–0 (H)	0–2 (A)	Second round	(Belgium) Anderlecht	3–3 (4–1 p)	0–3 (A)	3–0 (a.e.t.) (H)
(Switzerland) Servette	1–1 (a)	0–0 (H)	1–1 (A)	Quarter-finals	(England) Ipswich Town	2–2 (a)	1–2 (A)	1–0 (H)
(Czechoslovakia) Baník Ostrava	4–3	3–1 (H)	1–2 (A)	Semi-finals	(Belgium) Beveren	2–0	1–0 (H)	1–0 (A)

== Match ==
=== Details ===
16 May 1979
19:15

Fortuna Düsseldorf (West Germany)	3–4 (a.e.t.)	(Spain) Barcelona
T. Allofs 8'; Seel 41', 114'	Report	Sánchez 5'; Asensi 34'; Rexach 104'; Krankl 111'

St. Jakob Stadium, Basel
Attendance: 58,000
Referee: Károly Palotai (Hungary)

Fortuna Düsseldorf	Barcelona

GK	1	(West Germany) Jörg Daniel
DF	2	(West Germany) Dieter Brei	(substituted off) 24'
DF	3	(West Germany) Gerd Zewe (c)
DF	4	(West Germany) Gerd Zimmermann	(substituted off) 84'
DF	5	(West Germany) Heiner Baltes
MF	6	(West Germany) Egon Köhnen
MF	7	(West Germany) Hubert Schmitz
FW	8	(West Germany) Thomas Allofs
MF	9	(West Germany) Rudi Bommer
FW	10	(West Germany) Klaus Allofs
FW	11	(West Germany) Wolfgang Seel
Substitutes:
FW	12	(Denmark) Flemming Lund	(substituted on) 84'
MF	13	(West Germany) Josef Weikl	(substituted on) 24'
Manager:
(West Germany) Hans-Dieter Tippenhauer

GK	1	(Spain) Pedro Artola
DF	2	(Argentina) Rafael Zuviría
DF	3	(Spain) Migueli
DF	4	(Spain) Quique Costas	(substituted off) 68'
DF	5	(Spain) José Albaladejo	(substituted off) 57'
MF	6	(Netherlands) Johan Neeskens
FW	7	(Spain) Carles Rexach
MF	8	(Spain) Tente Sánchez
FW	9	(Austria) Hans Krankl
MF	10	(Spain) Juan Manuel Asensi (c)
FW	11	(Spain) Lobo Carrasco
Substitutes:
DF	12	(Spain) Antonio de la Cruz	(substituted on) 57'
MF	14	(Spain) Francisco Martínez	(substituted on) 68'
Manager:
(Spain) Joaquim Rifé

== See also ==
- 1979 European Cup Final
- 1979 UEFA Cup Final
- FC Barcelona in international football competitions
