= Inter-Cities Fairs Cup Trophy play-off =

- Event: Inter-Cities Fairs Cup
Barcelona	Leeds United
(Spain)	(England)
2	1
- Date: 22 September 1971
- Venue: Camp Nou, Barcelona
- Referee: István Zsolt (Hungary)
- Attendance: 45,000

The last Inter-Cities Fairs Cup edition was contested in the 1970–71 season before it was abolished and replaced by the UEFA Cup, a new seasonal confederation competition. The Fairs Cup trophy had not been won by any club permanently, so it was arranged a one match play-off game between the first and last competition winners: Barcelona and Leeds United, respectively. The game took place on 22 September 1971 at the Camp Nou.

== Match details ==
22 September 1971

Barcelona (Spain)	2–1	(England) Leeds United
Dueñas 51', 84'		Jordan 52'

Camp Nou, Barcelona
Attendance: 45,000
Referee: István Zsolt (Hungary)

Barcelona
Leeds United

GK	1	(Spain) Salvador Sadurní
	2	(Spain) Joaquim Rifé
	3	(Spain) Eladio
	4	(Spain) Antoni Torres
	5	(Spain) Gallego
	6	(Spain) Quique Costas
	7	(Spain) Carles Rexach
	8	(Spain) Juan Carlos
	9	(Spain) Teófilo Dueñas
	10	(Spain) Marcial
	11	(Spain) Juan Manuel Asensi	(substituted off) 79'
Substitutes:
FW	12	(Spain) Josep Maria Fusté	(substituted on) 79'
Manager:
(Netherlands) Rinus Michels

GK	1	(Wales) Gary Sprake
	2	(England) Paul Reaney
	3	(England) Nigel Davey
	4	(Scotland) Billy Bremner
	5	(England) Jack Charlton
	6	(England) Norman Hunter
	7	(Scotland) Peter Lorimer
	8	(Scotland) Joe Jordan
	9	(England) Rod Belfitt
	10	(Republic of Ireland) Johnny Giles
	11	(England) Chris Galvin
Manager:
(England) Don Revie

== See also ==
- FC Barcelona in international football competitions
- Inter-Cities Fairs Cup
- Leeds United F.C. in European football
