= Bernardo Cos =

Argentinian footballer (born 1949)

Personal information
- Full name: Bernardo Patricio Cos Luján
- Date of birth: 31 March 1949 (age 77)
- Place of birth: Córdoba, Córdoba Province, Argentina
- Height: 1.68 m (5 ft 6 in)
- Position: Forward

Youth career
- 1961–1966: San Lorenzo de Córdoba

Senior career*
Years	Team	Apps	(Gls)
1966–1970	San Lorenzo de Córdoba		
1970–1972	Belgrano		
1972–1975	Barcelona	48	(10)
1976–1978	Burgos		
1978	Belgrano		
1979	Deportivo Maipú		
- * Club domestic league appearances and goals

Bernardo Patricio Cos Luján (born 31 March 1949) is a retired Argentinian footballer. Nicknamed "Cuchi", he played as a forward for Barcelona and Burgos throughout the 1970s.

== Career ==
Cos began his football career with the youth sector of San Lorenzo de Córdoba at 12 years of age. He then made his senior debut for the club at 17 years of age in 1966, adorning the number 8 within the lower ranks of the club. However, he demonstrated enough talent that in between the 1969 and 1970 seasons, Belgrano expressed interest in signing the forward for their club and later found relative success at the 1971 Campeonato Nacional. Throughout the 1972 season, Spanish talent scout Juan Mascaró would express interest in Cos for him to play for either Barcelona or Málaga with this being a rare opportunity due to foreign players in European clubs still being a recent phenomenon. Despite being born in Argentina, he registered as a Paraguayan player for Barcelona for the 1972–73 season for $55,000. Arriving in the Catalan city with a tear in the right leg, despite initially considered fit for play by Doctor Moragas, he was injured once more in the club's first training session as his debut wouldn't be until six months later into the season. Nonetheless, he contributed to where the club ended as runners-up for the 1972–73 La Liga. He received the nickname "Cuchi" from a Catalonian newspaper in 1973 from ignorance and mockery of South American players that had arrived at Spain. The origin of this nicknamed stemmed from Cos' indigenous background and how the name was derived from the Sioux. At the time however, Cos took it as a part of Spanish humor.

The following season 1973–74 season saw the arrival of more foreigners to the club with legendary players such as Dutch international Johan Cruyff and Peruvian international Hugo Sotil being signed to Barça with players such as Marcial Pina, Juan Manuel Asensi and Carles Rexach playing beside Cos. His former Belgrano teammate Juan Carlos Heredia would also later play with Cos once more upon Heredia's signing to Barcelona for the 1974–75 season following initially not being allowed to play in Spain and instead opted for Portugal. Cos ended up leaving the club following worsening relations with new club manager Hennes Weisweiler following his desire to visit his sick parents back in Argentina. Overall, Cos made 48 appearances for the club and scored 10 goals. He then tried to leave for various other Spanish clubs and finally settled with Burgos for three seasons. He returned to Argentina to play for Belgrano for the remainder of the 1978 before spending his final season with Deportivo Maipú in 1979 before retiring at the age of 30.

== Later life ==
Cos later worked with his son at the Headquarters of the Provincial Bank of Córdoba. He remains an ardent supporter his former clubs of San Lorenzo de Córdoba and Barcelona.
