= Lluís Pujol =

Spanish footballer and manager

Personal information
- Full name: Lluís Pujol Codina
- Date of birth: 25 May 1947 (age 79)
- Place of birth: Castellbell, Spain
- Height: 1.72 m (5 ft 7 1/2 in)
- Position: Forward

Youth career
- La Bauma
- Sant Vicenç de Castellet
- Poble Nou
- 1961: Manresa
- 1961–1965: Barcelona

Senior career*
Years	Team	Apps	(Gls)
1965	Condal	8	(5)
1965–1973	Barcelona	63	(13)
1968–1969	→ Sabadell (loan)	29	(8)
1973–1974	Castellón	8	(1)
1974–1975	Sant Andreu	20	(2)
Total		128	(29)

International career
1964–1965	Spain U18	6	(2)
1969	Spain U23	1	(0)
1966	Spain amateur	2	(0)
1969	Spain	1	(0)

Managerial career
- 1978–1984: Barcelona (youth)
- 1984–1987: Barcelona C
- 1987–1989: Barcelona B
- 1989–1990: Sabadell
- 1992: Mollerussa
- 2000–2001: Hospitalet
- 2002–2003: Castelldefels
- * Club domestic league appearances and goals

Lluís Pujol Codina (born 25 May 1947) is a Spanish former football forward and manager.

== Club career ==
Born in Castellbell i el Vilar, Barcelona, Catalonia, Pujol was promoted to local FC Barcelona's first team in 1965. In his first three seasons, however, he could only total ten La Liga appearances, in which he managed to score five times. For 1968–69 he was loaned to neighbours CE Sabadell FC, helping the side to not only avoid top-flight relegation but finish in a best-ever fourth place, with the player contributing eight goals to the feat.

Returned to the Camp Nou, Pujol continued to be irregularly used – 25 games in 1970–71, 28 over the other three seasons – and eventually left for CD Castellón, in a disastrous top-division campaign as he appeared rarely for the Valencian club which also got relegated. He closed out his career at the age of 28, after one year with lowly UE Sant Andreu in his native region.

Pujol coached FC Barcelona Atlètic in the late 80s, suffering relegation from the Segunda División in his second year. He then moved to former team Sabadell, being dismissed in November 1990 with them in the same level.

== International career ==
On 15 October 1969, Pujol won his sole cap for Spain, which consisted of the second half of a 1970 FIFA World Cup qualifier against Finland, in a match played in La Línea de la Concepción and with the score already at 5–0 (eventually 6–0).

== Honours ==
Barcelona

- Copa del Generalísimo: 1970–71
- Inter-Cities Fairs Cup: 1965–66, 1971

Spain U18

- UEFA European Under-18 Championship runner-up: 1964
