= Llorenç Rifé =

Spanish footballer (1938–2021)

Personal information
- Full name: Llorenç Rifé Climent
- Date of birth: 5 February 1938
- Place of birth: Sant Celoni, Spain
- Date of death: 9 January 2021 (aged 82)
- Height: 1.81 m (5 ft 11 in)
- Position: Defender

Youth career
- Poble Nou
- Júpiter

Senior career*
Years	Team	Apps	(Gls)
1958–1959	Condal	12	(0)
1959–1962	Barcelona	1	(0)
1960–1961	→ Atlético Ceuta (loan)	22	(0)
1962–1964	Deportivo La Coruña	18	(0)
1964–1965	Gimnàstic de Tarragona		
Total		131	(38)
- * Club domestic league appearances and goals

Llorenç Rifé Climent (5 February 1938 – 9 January 2021) was a Spanish professional footballer who played as a defender.

== Career ==
Born in Sant Celoni, Rifé began his career at Poble Nou and Júpiter, before going on to play for Condal, Barcelona, Atlético Ceuta, Deportivo La Coruña and Gimnàstic de Tarragona. His time at Ceuta coincided with his military service in Melilla.

== Personal life ==
His brother Joaquim was also a footballer, as was their father and another brother, Josep Maria.
