= Pedro Aicart =

Bolivian–Peruvian footballer (1952–2013)

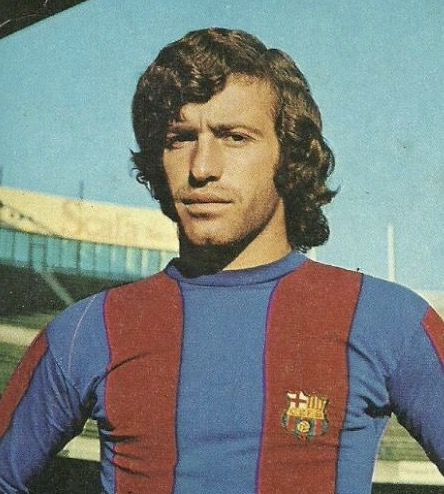
- Aicart in the 1973–74 season

Personal information
- Full name: Pedro Aicart Iniesta
- Date of birth: 28 March 1952
- Place of birth: Chulumani, La Paz, Bolivia
- Date of death: 21 February 2013 (aged 60)
- Place of death: Trujillo, La Libertad, Peru
- Height: 1.73 m (5 ft 8 in)
- Position: Forward

Senior career*
Years	Team	Apps	(Gls)
1972–1973	Universitario de Deportes		
1973–1974	Barcelona		
1974	Hércules		
1974–1975	Barcelona Atlètic		
1975–1979	Málaga		
1980	Juan Aurich		
1981–1982	Universitario de Deportes		
- * Club domestic league appearances and goals

Pedro Aicart Iniesta (28 March 1952 – 21 February 2013) was a Peruvian footballer who played as a forward. Born in Bolivia, he emigrated to Peru and he was known for his career in Universitario de Deportes as well as briefly playing for Barcelona.

== Club career ==
Aicart began his career with Universitario de Deportes in their 1972 season under club manager Roberto Scarone as the club went on to have their best performance out of any Peruvian club in the Copa Libertadores, 1972 finals of the annual tournament. He played as a substitute player and found enough success to play consistently under new manager Roberto Reynoso as most of the star players were playing for Peru. In his debut, he played in a 3–0 victory against a reserve team of Nacional as he entered in the second half in the match and play alongside Fernando Alva to disrupt the Nacional defense as Juan Carlos Oblitas also debuted in this match.

He later played in away matches which included a 3–3 draw against Nacional and a 2–1 defeat against Peñarol. On 22 November 1973, he travelled to Barcelona as he was signed by FC Barcelona for the 1973–74 La Liga alongside fellow Peruvian international Hugo Sotil and Dutch international Johan Cruyff as the club went on to win the season following a 13-season long drought without a title. Aicart himself only played in friendlies due to his status as a "native". In April 1974, he was traded to Hércules where he scored a goal against Osasuna at the El Sadar Stadium and contributed to the club's promotion to the 1974–75 La Liga.

Following spending the 1974–75 season with Barcelona Atlètic, he transferred to Málaga where he played for the rest of the 1970s as well as work as a player-coach for youth players. Aicart returned to Peru for the 1980 Torneo Descentralizado to play for Juan Aurich, where he helped the club avoid relegation. He also returned to Universito de Deportes in 1981 before retiring in 1982. He then worked as a youth manager, working at Academia Deportiva Cantolao as well as various sports clubs at Markham College. He was also one of the leading figures to suggest Lionel Messi to play within the youth sector of Barcelona. He also contributed to the community of Callao as he formed his own team named Cedro for disenfranchised boys within the area as the club later competed in the Liga del Callao. He also owned a cebichería in the port city.

== Personal life ==
Pedro Aicart was born in Chulumani, La Paz as the second son of Pedro Aicart and Josefa Iniesta who were Spanish immigrants from Murcia of Catalan descent. Despite his older brother, José, being born in Spain, his family fled due to the ongoing Spanish Civil War, first moving to Bolivia and Argentina before finally settling in Lima when he was three years old. He died on 28 July 2013 in Trujillo, La Libertad from cardiac arrest during a game of football with his friends.
