= Pere Valentí Mora =

Spanish footballer

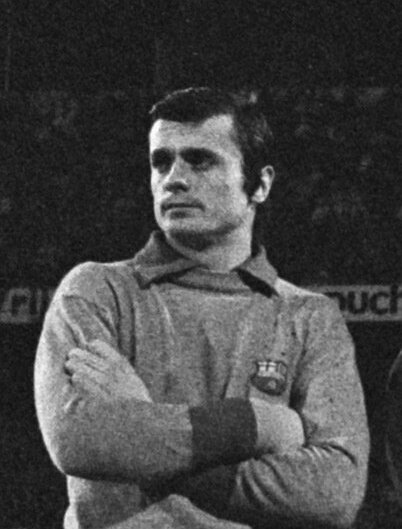

Personal information
- Full name: Pere Valentí Mora Mariné
- Date of birth: 18 December 1947 (age 78)
- Place of birth: Vilaplana, Spain
- Height: 1.80 m (5 ft 11 in)
- Position: Goalkeeper

Youth career
- Reus
- 1965–1967: Barcelona

Senior career*
Years	Team	Apps	(Gls)
1967–1968	Atlético Cataluña		
1968–1979	Barcelona	71	(0)
1968–1969	→ Mestalla (loan)	12	(0)
1969–1970	→ Oviedo (loan)	32	(0)
1971–1973	→ Elche (loan)	71	(0)
1979–1983	Rayo Vallecano	141	(0)
1983–1986	Murcia	30	(0)
Total		357	(0)

International career
1966	Spain U18	6	(0)
1969–1971	Spain U23	4	(0)
1967–1968	Spain amateur	13	(0)
1973–1976	Catalonia	2	(0)

Managerial career
- 1986–1987: TARR
- 1987–1989: Igualada
- 1989–1993: Barcelona (youth)
- 1993–1995: Gimnàstic
- 1995–1996: Murcia
- 1996: Murcia
- 1997–1998: Cartagena
- 1998–1999: Benidorm
- 1999–2002: Sabadell
- 2005–2006: Sabadell
- * Club domestic league appearances and goals

Pere Valentí Mora Mariné (born 18 December 1947) is a Spanish retired footballer who played as a goalkeeper, and a coach.

He made 133 appearances in La Liga, mostly with Barcelona, and added a further 224 in Segunda División.

== Playing career ==
Born in Vilaplana, Tarragona, Catalonia, Mora joined FC Barcelona's youth setup in 1965, aged 17. After appearing with the club's farm team, Atlético Cataluña CF, and serving loans at CD Mestalla, Elche CF and Real Oviedo, he made his first-team debut on 17 February 1974, starting in a 5–0 routing of Real Madrid at the Santiago Bernabéu Stadium.

Mora was mainly used as a backup to Salvador Sadurní and Pedro María Artola during his spell at Barça, but still featured in the 1978 Copa del Rey Final. He also held a record of being 406 minutes without conceding in European competitions, which was subsequently broken by Víctor Valdés.

In the summer of 1979, Mora signed with fellow La Liga side Rayo Vallecano. He was an undisputed starter during his stint, appearing in no less than 34 matches per season but suffering relegation in his first.

In 1983, Mora joined Real Murcia in the top level. He retired three years later with the club in Segunda División, aged 38.

== Managerial career ==
Mora took up coaching immediately after retiring, his first stop being at the TARR football academy. After two years at CF Igualada he returned to his former club Barcelona, being appointed as manager of the youth sides.

In 1993, Mora became the coach of Gimnàstic de Tarragona from Segunda División B. He continued to manage in that tier in the following years, with Murcia, Benidorm CF and CE Sabadell FC (two stints), also with a brief period in Tercera División with FC Cartagena.

== Personal life ==
Mora's son, also known as Pere Mora, was also a footballer and a goalkeeper. He died on 20 September 2005, in a motorcycle accident in L'Hospitalet de Llobregat.

== Honours ==
Barcelona

- La Liga: 1973–74
- Copa del Rey: 1970–71, 1977–78
- UEFA Cup Winners' Cup: 1978–79
