= Migueli =

Spanish footballer (born 1951)

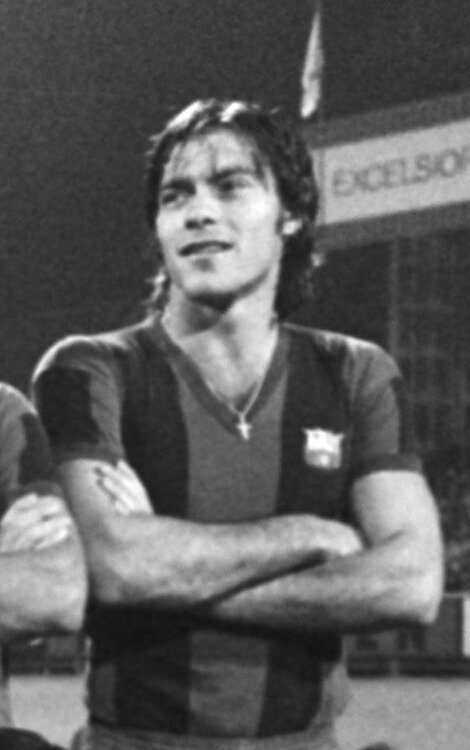
- Migueli with Barcelona in 1977

Personal information
- Full name: Miguel Bernardo Bianquetti
- Date of birth: 19 December 1951 (age 74)
- Place of birth: Ceuta, Spain
- Height: 1.83 m (6 ft 0 in)
- Position: Centre-back

Youth career
- O'Donnell
- Cádiz

Senior career*
Years	Team	Apps	(Gls)
1970–1973	Cádiz	77	(4)
1973–1988	Barcelona	391	(20)
Total		468	(24)

International career
1975–1976	Spain amateur	2	(0)
1974–1980	Spain	32	(1)
- * Club domestic league appearances and goals

Miguel Bernardo Bianquetti (born 19 December 1951), known as Migueli, is a Spanish former professional footballer who played as a central defender.

A player of immense physical power – he was nicknamed Tarzan– he was best known for his Barcelona spell, one that lasted 15 years. He started his career with Cádiz.

Migueli appeared with the Spain national team at the 1978 World Cup and Euro 1980.

== Club career ==
Migueli was born in Ceuta. After representing Cádiz CF from 1970 to 1973, competing in the Segunda División, he transferred to La Liga giants FC Barcelona, where he became an undisputed starter after just one league game in his first year, going on to make 391 appearances in the competition (549 overall, club's all-time best until 5 January 2011 when Xavi surpassed him in a Copa del Rey match against Athletic Bilbao); whilst he was performing his compulsory military service in Cádiz he made his official debut for the latter, and upon his return, not aware that he needed two special permits to leave the headquarters, he was jailed for one month.

In the final of the 1978–79 European Cup Winners' Cup against Fortuna Düsseldorf, Migueli played parts of the match, which went to extra time, with a broken collarbone, in an eventual 4–3 win. In the 1986–87 season, already well into his 30s, he still managed to make 41 appearances – 38 complete – and retired at the end of the following campaign, in which he added another domestic cup; he was still a part of new manager Johan Cruyff's plans, but chose not to continue.

Subsequently, Migueli worked with the Catalan club's coaching staffs in the Joan Gaspart presidency. On 17 September 2010, he was chosen by new chairman Sandro Rosell as sporting advisor alongside Josep Maria Fusté and Carles Rexach.

== International career ==
Migueli earned 32 caps and scored one goal for Spain, his debut coming on 20 November 1974 in a 2–1 win in Scotland for the UEFA Euro 1976 qualifiers. He represented the nation at the 1978 FIFA World Cup and Euro 1980, for a total of four appearances.

== Career statistics ==
=== Club ===
Appearances and goals by club, season and competition
Club	Season	League		Cup		Europe		Other (Note: Includes Supercopa de España, Copa de la Liga)		Total	
Club	Season	Apps	Goals	Apps	Goals	Apps	Goals	Apps	Goals	Apps	Goals
Cádiz	1970–71	10	0	1	0	—		—		11	0
Cádiz	1971–72	30	0	2	1	—		—		32	1
Cádiz	1972–73	37	4	3	0	—		—		40	4
Cádiz	Total	77	4	6	1	—		—		83	5
Barcelona	1973–74	1	0	0	0	0	0	—		1	0
Barcelona	1974–75	29	2	4	0	6	0	—		39	2
Barcelona	1975–76	34	5	5	0	9	1	—		48	6
Barcelona	1976–77	25	1	1	0	7	0	—		33	1
Barcelona	1977–78	33	2	6	1	10	1	—		49	4
Barcelona	1978–79	28	0	2	0	9	1	—		39	1
Barcelona	1979–80	31	2	2	1	7	0	—		40	3
Barcelona	1980–81	20	3	6	1	2	0	—		28	4
Barcelona	1981–82	3	0	1	0	2	0	—		6	0
Barcelona	1982–83	31	1	6	0	6	0	6	0	49	1
Barcelona	1983–84	30	0	7	0	3	1	2	0	42	1
Barcelona	1984–85	32	4	8	0	1	0	4	0	44	4
Barcelona	1985–86	29	0	5	0	9	0	1	0	44	0
Barcelona	1986–87	41	0	0	0	8	0	—		49	0
Barcelona	1987–88	24	0	7	0	6	0	—		37	0
Barcelona	Total	391	20	60	3	85	4	13	0	549	27
Career total		468	24	66	4	85	4	13	0	632	32

=== International ===
Score and result list Spain's goal tally first, score column indicates score after Migueli goal.

International goal scored by Migueli
No.	Date	Venue	Opponent	Score	Result	Competition
1	16 April 1980	El Molinón, Gijón, Spain	Czechoslovakia	1–1	2–2	Friendly

== Honours ==
Barcelona

- La Liga: 1973–74, 1984–85
- Copa del Rey: 1977–78, 1980–81, 1982–83, 1987–88
- Supercopa de España: 1983
- Copa de la Liga: 1983, 1986
- UEFA Cup Winners' Cup: 1978–79, 1981–82

Individual

- Don Balón Award: 1977–78, 1984–85
- La Liga Team of The Year: 1977–78, 1979–80, 1982–83, 1983–84, 1984–85, 1986–87
