= Juanito (footballer, born 1948) =

Spanish footballer

Personal information
- Full name: Juan Díaz Sánchez
- Date of birth: 6 October 1948
- Place of birth: Santa Cruz de Tenerife, Spain
- Date of death: 3 April 2013 (aged 64)
- Place of death: Santa Cruz de Tenerife, Spain
- Height: 1.67 m (5 ft 5 1/2 in)
- Position: Forward

Senior career*
Years	Team	Apps	(Gls)
1971–1972	Tenerife	24	(4)
1972–1975	Barcelona	43	(5)
1975–1976	Hércules	30	(3)
1976–1981	Salamanca	114	(25)
1981–1982	Tenerife	4	(0)
1982–1983	Mensajero		
Total		215	(37)
- * Club domestic league appearances and goals

Juan Díaz Sánchez (6 October 1948 – 3 April 2013), commonly known as Juanito, was a Spanish footballer who played as a forward.

== Career ==
Born in Santa Cruz de Tenerife, Canary Islands, Juanito started and finished his 11-year professional career with hometown club CD Tenerife. He played one season in the Segunda División with them, then signed for FC Barcelona in late February 1972. He made his La Liga debut on 19 March, starting in a 1–0 away win against Athletic Bilbao.

Juanito contributed 17 games in the 1973–74 campaign as the Catalans won the national championship, scoring in a 3–0 home victory over UD Las Palmas on 6 January 1974. He appeared in three UEFA Cup matches during his spell, netting against OGC Nice in the 1973–74 edition.

In 1975, in another winter transfer window move, Juanito joined fellow top-division team Hércules CF for three years. In the 1976 summer, however, he moved to UD Salamanca, going on to compete a further five seasons in the top flight; two of his league goals came against former employers Barcelona (13 February 1977, 2–0 home win) and Real Madrid (1–1 home draw, on 16 March 1980).

Juanito retired in 1983 at the age of 34, after one-year spells with Tenerife and amateurs CD Mensajero.

== Death ==
Juanito lost a son whilst a player of Hércules, aged only 15. He himself died on 3 April 2013 in his hometown, at 64.

== Honours ==
Barcelona

- La Liga: 1973–74
