= 1975–76 La Liga =

45th season of La Liga

Primera División
- Season: 1975–76
- Champions: Real Madrid (17th title)
- Relegated: Real Oviedo; Granada; Sporting Gijón
- European Cup: Real Madrid
- UEFA Cup Winners' Cup: Atlético Madrid
- UEFA Cup: Barcelona; Español; Athletic Bilbao
- Matches: 306
- Goals: 765 (2.5 per match)
- Top goalscorer: Quini (21 goals)

The 1975–76 La Liga was the 45th season since its establishment. The season began on 6 September 1975, and concluded on 16 May 1976.

== Team locations ==
Location of teams in La Liga 1975–76
Canary Islands

Team	Home city	Stadium
Athletic Bilbao	Bilbao	San Mamés
Atlético Madrid	Madrid	Vicente Calderón
Barcelona	Barcelona	Nou Camp
Elche	Elche	Altabix
Español	Barcelona	Sarriá
Granada	Granada	Los Cármenes
Hércules	Alicante	José Rico Pérez
Las Palmas	Las Palmas	Insular
Oviedo	Oviedo	Carlos Tartiere
Racing Santander	Santander	El Sardinero
Real Betis	Seville	Benito Villamarín
Real Madrid	Madrid	Santiago Bernabéu
Real Sociedad	San Sebastián	Atocha
Salamanca	Villares de la Reina	Helmántico
Sevilla	Seville	Ramón Sánchez Pizjuán
Sporting Gijón	Gijón	El Molinón
Valencia	Valencia	Luis Casanova
Zaragoza	Zaragoza	La Romareda

== League table ==
Pos	Team	Pld	W	D	L	GF	GA	GD	Pts	Qualification or relegation
1	Real Madrid (C)	34	20	8	6	54	26	+28	48	Qualification for the European Cup first round
2	Barcelona	34	18	7	9	61	41	+20	43	Qualification for the UEFA Cup first round
3	Atlético Madrid	34	18	6	10	60	38	+22	42	Qualification for the Cup Winners' Cup first round (Note: Atlético Madrid qualified to the Cup Winners' Cup as winners of the Copa del Generalísimo.)
4	Español	34	18	4	12	48	45	+3	40	Qualification for the UEFA Cup first round
5	Athletic Bilbao	34	14	11	9	43	38	+5	39	Qualification for the UEFA Cup first round
6	Hércules	34	12	12	10	33	37	−4	36	
7	Real Betis	34	15	5	14	34	50	−16	35	
8	Real Sociedad	34	12	10	12	45	45	0	34	
9	Salamanca	34	12	10	12	31	33	−2	34	
10	Valencia	34	12	8	14	43	41	+2	32	
11	Sevilla	34	13	6	15	35	39	−4	32	
12	Racing Santander	34	14	4	16	45	56	−11	32	
13	Las Palmas	34	12	6	16	39	43	−4	30	
14	Zaragoza	34	11	8	15	45	43	+2	30	
15	Elche	34	8	12	14	38	49	−11	28	
16	Oviedo (R)	34	11	5	18	41	45	−4	27	Relegation to the Segunda División
17	Granada (R)	34	8	10	16	29	50	−21	26	Relegation to the Segunda División
18	Sporting Gijón (R)	34	7	10	17	41	46	−5	24	Relegation to the Segunda División

Source: BDFútbol
Rules for classification: 1) Points; 2) Head-to-head results; 3) Goal difference; 4) Number of goals scored
(C) Champions; (R) Relegated

== Results table ==
Home \ Away	ATB	ATM	BAR	BET	ELC	ESP	GRA	HÉR	LPA	RAC	RMA	ROV	RSO	SAL	SEV	SPG	VAL	ZAR
Atlético Bilbao		2–0	2–1	0–0	0–0	2–1	2–1	1–0	1–0	1–0	2–0	1–0	2–0	1–0	4–1	2–1	5–4	0–0
Atlético Madrid	2–0		3–0	4–0	3–0	3–1	3–2	3–0	2–1	1–1	1–0	3–1	2–2	4–1	1–0	2–2	1–0	2–0
FC Barcelona	2–1	2–1		3–1	1–0	5–0	3–0	1–1	3–0	2–1	2–1	2–0	2–0	3–1	2–0	5–1	1–1	2–1
Betis	0–0	1–3	1–0		2–0	1–2	4–1	1–0	1–0	3–0	0–2	2–1	1–0	1–1	1–0	1–0	2–1	1–0
Elche CF	3–1	3–1	2–3	2–3		2–1	0–0	1–1	1–1	5–2	1–1	1–0	1–1	1–1	2–0	1–0	2–0	0–0
RCD Español	3–1	1–0	3–0	2–1	2–0		3–0	3–1	1–0	2–1	0–1	3–1	2–2	3–0	1–0	2–1	1–0	2–1
Granada CF	2–1	3–4	0–2	0–0	3–2	0–1		0–0	1–0	2–0	1–2	1–0	2–1	0–0	1–1	1–1	2–1	0–0
Hércules CF	2–2	1–1	0–0	1–1	1–0	2–1	2–0		1–0	2–1	1–2	1–0	0–0	1–0	1–0	1–1	2–0	2–0
UD Las Palmas	2–2	2–0	3–1	3–0	0–0	1–1	1–2	2–1		5–0	2–2	0–0	2–1	1–0	0–1	2–1	2–4	3–2
Racing de Santander	1–1	4–3	2–1	3–0	2–1	1–1	1–1	4–1	2–1		1–0	2–1	2–0	1–0	2–1	2–0	0–1	4–1
Real Madrid	1–0	1–0	0–2	5–0	2–2	3–1	4–1	4–0	2–1	2–0		2–0	1–0	1–0	2–0	2–0	2–0	3–2
Real Oviedo	4–1	0–2	1–1	3–0	4–1	1–2	3–0	1–1	1–2	2–0	0–0		3–0	0–1	3–0	3–1	2–1	2–0
Real Sociedad	3–2	1–1	2–2	3–2	4–0	1–0	2–0	3–0	2–0	3–2	1–1	0–2		1–1	4–1	1–0	1–1	1–1
UD Salamanca	2–1	2–2	2–0	2–0	2–2	1–0	1–1	0–1	1–0	3–0	0–0	0–0	1–2		1–1	1–0	2–0	1–0
Sevilla FC	0–0	1–0	2–0	2–0	2–1	2–1	1–0	0–0	3–0	3–1	1–1	4–0	2–1	1–2		2–1	3–1	0–0
Sporting de Gijón	1–1	1–0	1–1	5–0	1–1	6–1	0–0	1–3	3–0	1–2	0–2	3–1	3–0	0–1	1–0		1–1	2–2
Valencia CF	0–0	0–1	3–2	0–1	2–0	0–0	2–1	2–2	0–1	3–0	1–1	2–0	3–1	1–0	3–0	0–0		3–2
Zaragoza	1–1	2–1	4–4	1–2	2–0	4–0	2–0	1–0	0–1	2–0	3–1	5–1	0–1	3–0	1–0	2–1	0–2	

Legend: Blue = home team win; Yellow = draw; Red = away team win.

== Pichichi Trophy ==
Rank	Player	Club	Goals
1	(Spain) Quini	Sporting Gijón	21
2	(Brazil) Leivinha	Atlético Madrid	18
2	(Spain) Aitor Aguirre Uriarte	Racing Santander	18
4	(Paraguay) Diarte	Zaragoza	16
4	(Argentina) Carlos Morete	Las Palmas	16
6	(Spain) Dani	Atlético Bilbao	14
6	(Netherlands) Johnny Rep	Valencia	14
8	(Argentina) Rubén Ayala	Atlético Madrid	13
8	(Chile) Carlos Caszely	Español	13
8	(Spain) Pirri	Real Madrid	13
