= Antoni Torres =

Spanish footballer

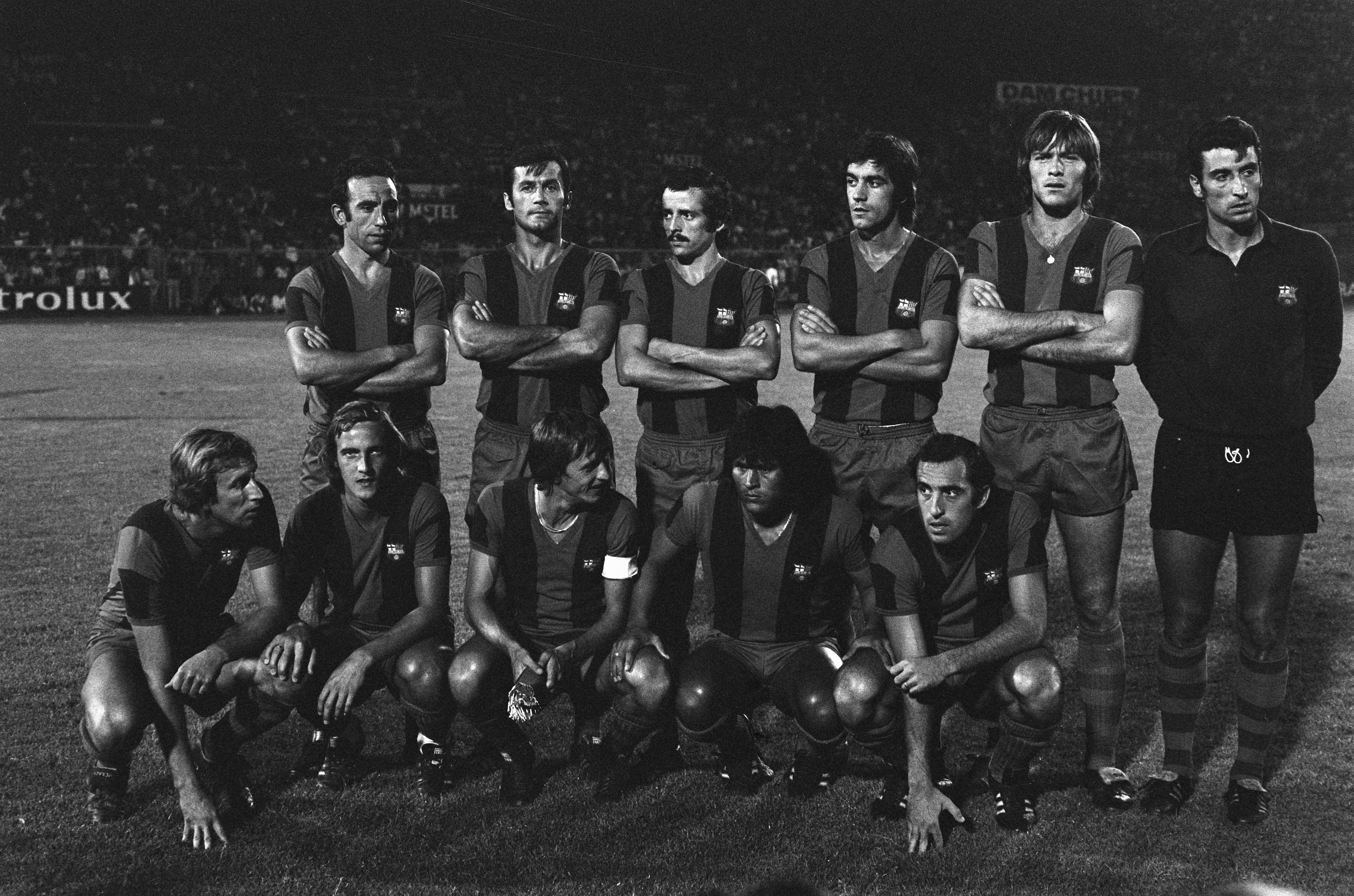
- Torres (standing, second to left) in 1975

Personal information
- Full name: Antoni Torres García
- Date of birth: 29 July 1943
- Place of birth: Balaguer, Spain
- Date of death: 24 February 2003 (aged 59)
- Place of death: Barcelona, Catalonia, Spain
- Height: 1.78 m (5 ft 10 in)
- Position: Defender

Youth career
- Balaguer
- Barcelona

Senior career*
Years	Team	Apps	(Gls)
1963–1965	Hércules	50	(1)
1965–1976	Barcelona	270	(2)

International career
1963–1964	Spain amateur	8	(0)
1968–1969	Spain	5	(0)

Managerial career
- 1978–1979: Barcelona B
- 1980: Barcelona B
- 1980–1983: Barcelona B
- 1983–1985: Castellón
- 1985: Hércules
- * Club domestic league appearances and goals

Antoni Torres García (29 July 1943 – 24 February 2003) was a Spanish footballer. He was active during the 1960s and 1970s, and was officially recognized as a legendary player for Barcelona. He was born on 29 July 1943 in Balaguer, Lerida, Spain. He died of cancer in Barcelona on 24 February 2003, at the age of 59.

== Barcelona ==
Born in Balaguer, Lleida, Catalonia, Torres spent most of his career at Barcelona, playing 479 games as a starter between 1965 and 1976. He mainly played as a traditional defender or a libero.

Before signing for Barcelona, Torres played for Hercules, where he established himself as a central defender. In the 1964–65 season, he received the award for the best footballer of the Spanish League. After three years at Barcelona, he found his way in to the national team, and earned five caps with le selecíon between 1968 and 1969.

He retired at end of the 1975–1976 season. On 1 September 1976, he received a tribute organized by Barcelona, along with his teammates, Joaquim Rifé and Salvador Sadurní.

After retiring, he took up coaching. In 1984, he founded a football youth school in Barcelona, TARR Escuela, which is named after the initials of its four founders, all former players of Barcelona: Torres, Asensi, Rexach and Rifé.

== Honours ==
- 1 Inter-Cities Fairs Cup: 1965–1966.
- 2 Copa del Rey: 1967–1968, 1970–1971
- 1 Liga: 1973–1974
