= José Antonio Barrios =

Spanish footballer (born 1949)

Personal information
- Full name: José Antonio Barrios Olivero
- Date of birth: 21 March 1949 (age 77)
- Place of birth: Tenerife, Spain

Senior career*
Years	Team	Apps	(Gls)
1966–1968	Tenerife	54	(24)
1968–1972	Granada	85	(17)
1972–1974	Barcelona	30	(8)
1974–1978	Hércules	115	(35)
1978–1980	Levante	45	(13)
1980–1981	Tenerife	24	(8)
1981–1982	Orotava		

International career
- Spain
- * Club domestic league appearances and goals

José Antonio Barrios (born 21 March 1949) is a Spanish former footballer and football manager. He competed in the men's tournament at the 1968 Summer Olympics.

== Career ==
Born in Tenerife, Barrios began playing football with local side CD Tenerife. Known as el Tigre, he made his senior debut for the club during the 1966–67 Segunda División season. Ahead of the 1968–69 La Liga season, Barrios was transferred to Granada CF, where he would play for four seasons. Manager Rinus Michels brought Barrios to FC Barcelona for the 1972–73 La Liga season, and Barrios led the club with twelve goals. However, the following season, Barcelona brought in Johan Cruyff and Barrios became a reserve forward as the club won its first La Liga title in ten years.

Barrios was then transferred to Hércules CF, where he would become the club's all-time leading goal-scorer in La Liga, with 35 goals in 115 league matches over four seasons. After his success with Hércules, Barrios moved to Levante UD for the 1979–79 Segunda B División season. He led Levante to promotion to the Segunda División before returning to his home town club Tenerife, now playing the Segunda B. A season later, Barrios finished his playing career at UD Orotava.
