= Baesweiler 09 =

German football club

Baesweiler SV
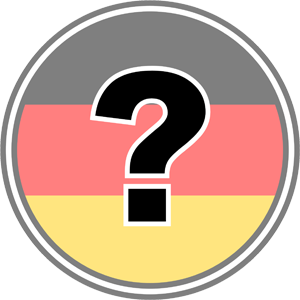
- Full name: Baesweiler Sportverein 1909 e.V.
- Founded: 1909
- League: defunct
Home colours	Away colours

Baesweiler 09 was a German association football club from the city of Baesweiler, North Rhine-Westphalia.

== History ==
The club was established in 1909 as Superior Baesweiler and in 1920 merged with Alemannia Baesweiler to create Sportverein Baesweiler 09. The club took on SV Oidtweiler as a partner in 1922 in a union that lasted until 1933.

Between 1947–56 and 1957–64, SV played in the Amateurliga Mittelrhein (II) capturing division titles there in 1951, 1954, and 1960. Following the 1963 formation of the Bundesliga, Germany's first professional top flight league, the Amateurliga became a third division circuit. The Baesweiler club finished in last place in 1964 and was absent from the Amateurliga for a season, but immediately bounced back. They played another five seasons in the third tier before slipping again and spending two seasons in the Verbandsliga Mittelrhein (IV).

Baesweiler returned to the Amateurliga Mittelrhein where they would spend 13 of the next 15 seasons. They had a close brush with relegation in 1975 when they were beaten 3:4 by VfL Köln in a playoff, but the result was reversed on appeal. They were relegated twice – in 1982 and 1985 – but returned to what had become the Amateuroberliga Nordrhein (III) after single season absences. After another failed campaign in 1987 SV was relegated again and spent the next 8 seasons in lower level play.

In 1995, the club advanced to the Oberliga Nordrhein (IV), where they played for four seasons as a lower-tier team before declaring bankruptcy and withdrawing from competition in 1999. Following the bankruptcy, a youth club named Jugendsportverein Baesweiler 09 was established and remains active today.
