= Gallego (footballer) =

Spanish footballer

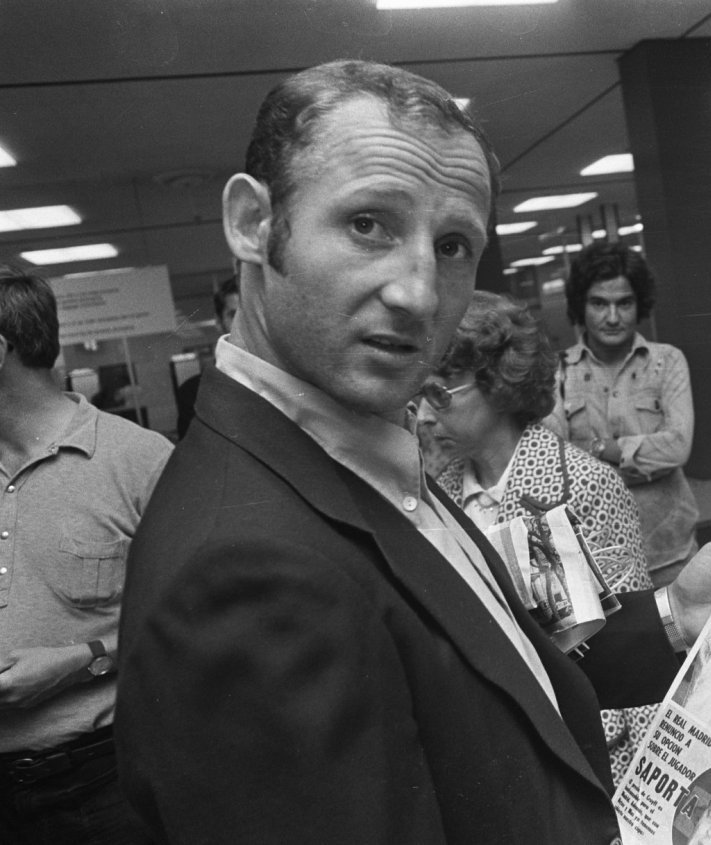
- Gallego in 1973

Personal information
- Full name: Francisco Fernández Rodríguez
- Date of birth: 4 March 1944 (age 82)
- Place of birth: Puerto Real, Spain
- Height: 1.77 m (5 ft 10 in)
- Position: Centre back

Youth career
- San José
- Sevilla

Senior career*
Years	Team	Apps	(Gls)
1961–1965	Sevilla	69	(7)
1965–1975	Barcelona	248	(17)
1975–1980	Sevilla	116	(2)
Total		433	(26)

International career
1961–1962	Spain U18	4	(0)
1964	Spain B	1	(0)
1966–1973	Spain	36	(0)
Medal record
Representing Spain
UEFA European Championship
Winner	1964 Spain
- * Club domestic league appearances and goals

Francisco Fernández Rodríguez (born 4 March 1944 at Puerto Real), nicknamed Gallego, is a Spanish former professional footballer who played as a defender.

During his club career, Gallego played for Sevilla FC (1961–65, 1975–80, with 185 first division matches and 9 goals) and FC Barcelona (1965–75, adding a further 248 games with 17 goals). He won the 1973–74 national championship.

Gallego earned 36 caps for the Spain national team and played in the 1966 FIFA World Cup.

== Honours ==
Barcelona

- Primera División: 1973–74
- Copa del Rey: 1967–68, 1970–71
- Inter-Cities Fairs Cup: 1965–66, 1971

Spain

- European Football Championship: 1964

== See also ==
- List of FC Barcelona players (100+ appearances)
- List of La Liga players (400+ appearances)
