= Juan Manuel Asensi =

Spanish footballer (born 1949)

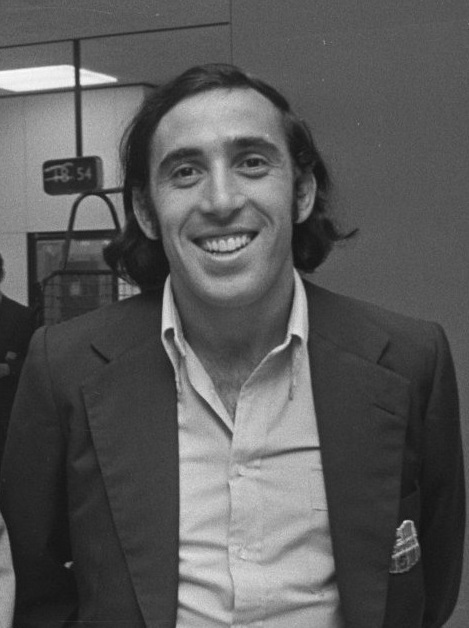
- Asensi in 1973

Personal information
- Full name: Juan Manuel Asensi Ripoll
- Date of birth: 23 September 1949 (age 77)
- Place of birth: Alicante, Spanish State
- Height: 1.78 m (5 ft 10 in)
- Position: Midfielder

Youth career
- Elche

Senior career*
Years	Team	Apps	(Gls)
1966–1967	Ilicitano		
1967–1970	Elche	80	(23)
1970–1980	Barcelona	299	(74)
1980–1982	Puebla	69	(19)
1982–1983	Oaxtepec	29	(0)
Total		477	(116)

International career
1967–1968	Spain U18	4	(2)
1969–1971	Spain U23	8	(1)
1967–1971	Spain amateur	9	(2)
1969–1980	Spain	41	(7)

Managerial career
- 1992–1995: Barcelona (youth)
- 2002: Orihuela
- * Club domestic league appearances and goals

Juan Manuel Asensi Ripoll (born 23 September 1949) is a Spanish retired footballer who played as an attacking midfielder. He was a driving force behind the Barcelona teams of the 1970s, known for his speed and strength in possession, as well as one-touch play. He is listed among the all-time team greats in the Barça legends roster by FC Barcelona. On the international level, Asensi represented Spain 41 times from 1969 through 1980, scoring 7 goals.

== Club career ==
Born in Alicante, Valencian Community, Asensi began his career at local Elche – at the time in La Liga – before joining Barcelona in 1970, for 80 million pesetas. During his time at the club, he was instrumental in helping the Catalans win the league in 1974 (34 matches, 11 goals, third-best in squad), also adding the UEFA Cup Winners' Cup in 1979 and scoring in the final held in Basel.

After only ten matches in the 1980–81 season, but 484 competitive appearances with 124 goals, 32-year-old Asensi moved to Mexico where he would play until his retirement in 1983. He had two brief spells at coaching, with Barcelona's youth sides and lowly Orihuela.

== International career ==
Asensi represented Spain 41 times, scoring seven goals. His debut came on 23 February 1969 in a 1–2 loss against Belgium for the 1970 FIFA World Cup qualification, as the country did not make it to the final stages.

Asensi was picked for the squads at the 1978 World Cup and UEFA Euro 1980 – his last international was played in the latter competition, also against Belgium (and also 1–2 defeat) – and also competed at the 1968 Summer Olympics.

=== International goals ===
#	Date	Venue	Opponent	Score	Result	Competition
1.	23 February 1969	Sclessin, Liège, Belgium	Belgium	2–1	2–1	1970 World Cup qualification
2.	11 October 1972	Santiago Bernabéu, Madrid, Spain	Argentina	1–0	1–0	Friendly
3.	19 October 1972	Insular, Las Palmas, Spain	Yugoslavia	2–2	2–2	1974 World Cup qualification
4.	23 February 1974	Sarrià, Barcelona, Spain	West Germany	1–0	1–0	Friendly
5.	11 June 1978	José Amalfitani, Buenos Aires, Argentina	Sweden	1–0	1–0	1978 FIFA World Cup
6.	15 November 1978	Luis Casanova, Valencia, Spain	Romania	1–0	1–0	Euro 1980 qualifying
7.	13 December 1978	Helmántico, Villares de la Reina, Spain	Cyprus	1–0	5–0	Euro 1980 qualifying

== Post-retirement ==
In 1984, Asensi co-founded the TARR football school in Barcelona with fellow ex-players Carles Rexach, Joaquim Rifé and Antoni Torres.

== Honours ==
Barcelona

- La Liga: 1973–74
- Copa del Rey: 1970–71, 1977–78, 1980–81
- UEFA Cup Winners' Cup: 1978–79
- Inter-Cities Fairs Cup: 1971 Trophy Play-Off
