= Campo de Altabix =

Multi-use stadium in Elche, Spain

- Interactive map of Campo de Altabix
- Full name: Campo de Altabix
- Location: Elche, Spain
- Owner: Elche CF and Elche
- Operator: Elche CF and Elche
- Capacity: 15,000

Construction
- Opened: October 17, 1926
- Closed: 1976

Tenant
- Elche CF

Campo de Altabix was a multi-use stadium in Elche, Spain. It was initially used as the stadium of Elche CF matches. It was replaced by the current Estadio Manuel Martínez Valero in 1976. The capacity of the stadium was 15,000 spectators.

== History ==
Campo de Altabix was located in the neighborhood of Elche called Altabix, which served as the name of the stadium. On 17 October 1926 the stadium was inaugurated with a friendly game between Elche and Levante that ended with a 2:2 draw. It was the official stadium of Elche CF until 8 September 1976, when the Estadio Manuel Martínez Valero was opened. The last match at the Campo de Altabix was played against a Portuguese club C.F. Os Belenenses. It took place on 18 August 1978. On 15 September 1981, the demolition works of the stadium began.
