= Antonio de la Cruz =

Spanish footballer and manager

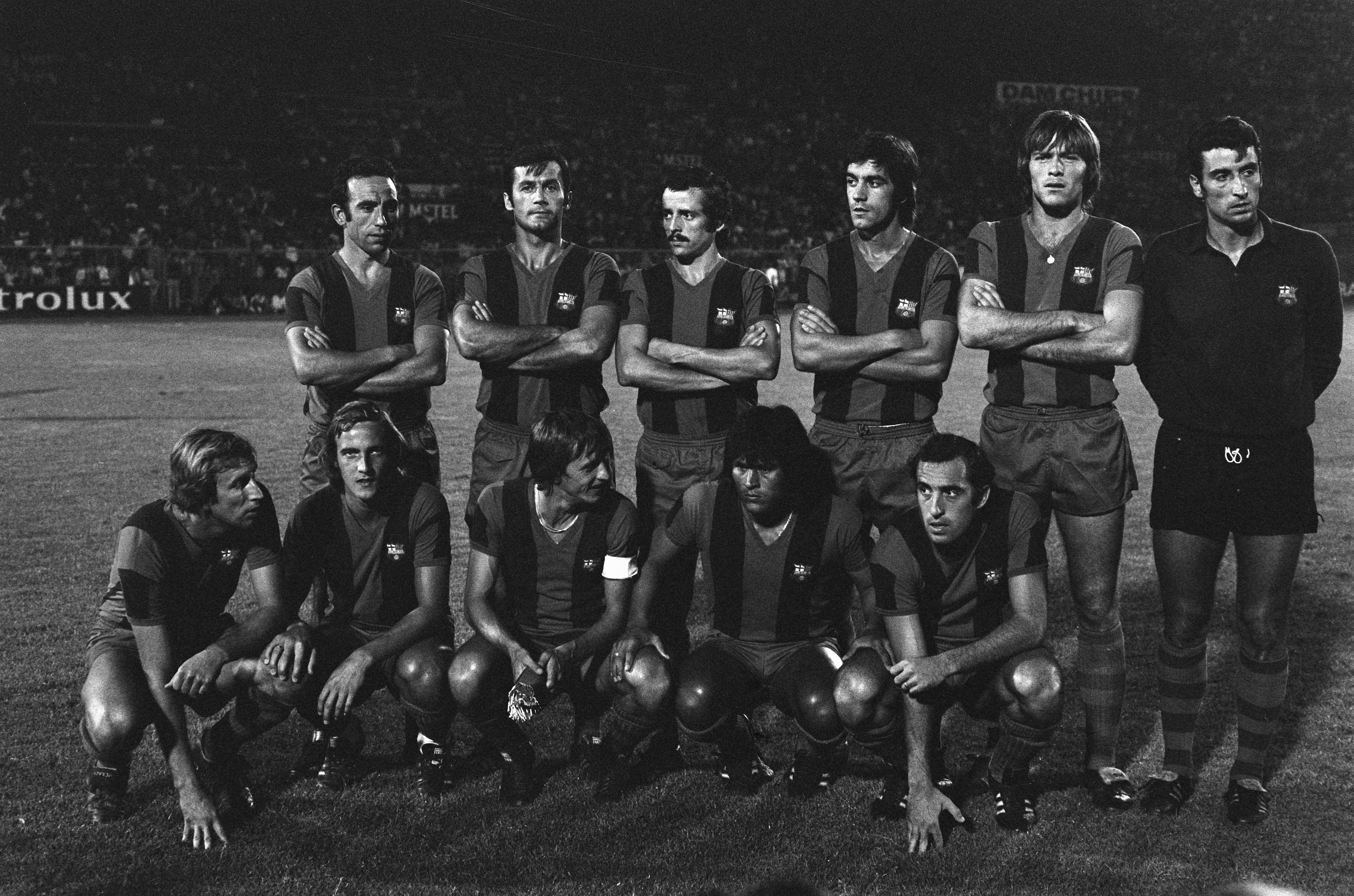
- De la Cruz (standing, third to left) with Barcelona in 1975

Personal information
- Full name: Jesús Antonio de la Cruz Gallego
- Date of birth: 7 May 1947 (age 79)
- Place of birth: León, Spain
- Height: 1.71 m (5 ft 7 in)
- Position: Defender

Youth career
- Júpiter Leonés
- Valladolid

Senior career*
Years	Team	Apps	(Gls)
1966–1970	Valladolid	87	(0)
1970–1972	Granada	64	(0)
1972–1979	Barcelona	183	(6)
Total		334	(6)

International career
1971	Spain U23	1	(0)
1972–1978	Spain	6	(0)

Managerial career
- 1987–1988: Sabadell
- 1989–1990: Barcelona C
- 1991–1996: Barcelona C
- 1998–1999: Yokohama F. Marinos
- 2003: Barcelona (interim)
- * Club domestic league appearances and goals

Jesús Antonio de la Cruz Gallego (born 7 May 1947) is a Spanish former professional football defender and manager.

He appeared in 247 La Liga games over the course of nine seasons, scoring a total of six goals for Granada and Barcelona. He won three titles with the latter club, including the 1979 Cup Winners' Cup.

A Spain international in the 70s, de la Cruz represented his country in the 1978 World Cup.

== Club career ==
Born in León, de la Cruz started his senior career with Real Valladolid in the Segunda División. Even though he suffered relegation at the end of the 1969–70 season, he moved straight into La Liga with Granada, making his debut in the competition on 13 September 1970 in a 1–1 away draw against Elche.

In early March 1972, de la Cruz signed with fellow top-division club Barcelona for six million pesetas, pending a medical that almost went wrong and with the deal being made effective in July. He went on to feature in 247 official matches during his tenure at the Camp Nou, scoring his first goal on 7 January 1973 in a 2–0 win at Real Zaragoza. On 16 May 1979, the 32-year-old came on as a second-half substitute in the final of the UEFA Cup Winners' Cup in Basel, the 4–3 extra time defeat of Fortuna Düsseldorf.

De la Cruz worked as a coach after retiring. This included two brief spells with Sabadell, also in Catalonia (which included top-flight relegation in the 1987–88 campaign).

In January 2003, following the dismissal of Louis van Gaal and prior to the appointment of Radomir Antić, de la Cruz was named interim manager at Barcelona. He was in charge of the squad for one league match, the 3–0 away loss to Atlético Madrid.

== International career ==
De la Cruz earned six caps for Spain in as many years. His debut arrived on 12 April 1972, in a 0–0 friendly draw in Greece.

Selected by coach László Kubala for the 1978 FIFA World Cup, de la Cruz took part in the 2–1 group stage defeat against Austria, as the tournament in Argentina ended after three games.

== Honours ==
Barcelona

- La Liga: 1973–74
- Copa del Rey: 1977–78
- UEFA Cup Winners' Cup: 1978–79

== Managerial statistics (Japan only) ==
Team	From	To	Record				
Team	From	To	G	W	D	L	Win %
Yokohama F. Marinos	1998	1999	47	29	3	15	61.70
Total			47	29	3	15	61.70
