= Juan Carlos (footballer, born 1945) =

Spanish footballer

Personal information
- Full name: Juan Carlos Pérez López
- Date of birth: 14 February 1945
- Place of birth: Santander, Spain
- Date of death: 16 January 2012 (aged 66)
- Place of death: Santander, Spain
- Height: 1.74 m (5 ft 9 in)
- Position: Midfielder

Youth career
- Toluca

Senior career*
Years	Team	Apps	(Gls)
1964–1966	Rayo Cantabria		
1965–1966	→ Gimnástica (loan)		
1966–1968	Racing Santander	34	(3)
1968–1975	Barcelona	163	(17)
1975–1978	Racing Santander	75	(5)
Total		272	(25)

International career
1973–1974	Spain	2	(0)
- * Club domestic league appearances and goals

Juan Carlos Pérez López (14 February 1945 – 16 January 2012), known as Juan Carlos, was a Spanish footballer who played as a midfielder.

His 14-year professional career was closely associated with Racing de Santander and Barcelona, having captained both clubs and appeared in 238 La Liga games over the course of ten seasons (22 goals scored).

== Club career ==
Born in Santander, Cantabria, Juan Carlos started his professional career with local Racing de Santander after being promoted from its reserve side, Rayo Cantabria, in early 1966. He played two full seasons with the team, being relegated from Segunda División in 1968.

In the following off-season, Juan Carlos signed with La Liga powerhouse FC Barcelona, making his debut in the competition on 24 November 1968 in a 1–0 home win against RCD Español. He only totalled 19 league appearances in his first two campaigns (four goals), mainly due to injuries.

Subsequently, Juan Carlos became a first-team regular, also managing to be captain of a team which also included Johan Cruyff, Johan Neeskens and Carles Rexach. In 1973–74 he won the national championship – his second major trophy with the Catalans – contributing a career-best seven goals in 34 games, including the fourth in a 5–0 win at the Santiago Bernabéu Stadium over Real Madrid.

In the 1975 summer, Juan Carlos returned to his previous club, now in the top division, playing a further three seasons. On 7 May 1978 he appeared in his last game, scoring in a 1–0 win against Sporting de Gijón which certified Racing's permanence in the competition.

== International career ==
Juan Carlos earned two caps for Spain, over a three-month period. His debut arrived on 24 November 1973 in a friendly with West Germany, playing 45 minutes in the 1–2 loss in Stuttgart.

== Death ==
Juan Carlos died on 16 January 2012 at the age of 66, in his hometown of Santander, after a long battle with illness.
