= Marcial Pina =

Spanish footballer and manager

Personal information
- Full name: Marcial Manuel Pina Morales
- Date of birth: 23 August 1946 (age 80)
- Place of birth: Bárzana, Spain
- Height: 1.80 m (5 ft 11 in)
- Position: Midfielder

Youth career
- Elche

Senior career*
Years	Team	Apps	(Gls)
1963–1964	Ilicitano		
1964–1966	Elche	48	(5)
1966–1969	Español	58	(15)
1969–1977	Barcelona	210	(47)
1977–1980	Atlético Madrid	63	(12)
Total		379	(79)

International career
1967–1970	Spain U23	4	(0)
1966–1975	Spain	15	(0)

Managerial career
- 1996–1997: Elche
- 2000: Elche
- 2001: Elche
- * Club domestic league appearances and goals

Marcial Manuel Pina Morales (born 23 August 1946), sometimes known simply as Marcial, is a Spanish retired footballer who played as a midfielder.

Over the course of 16 seasons, he amassed La Liga totals of 379 games and 79 goals in representation of four teams, mainly Barcelona, with which he won three major titles.

== Club career ==
Born in Bárzana de Quirós, Asturias, Marcial made his professional debuts with Elche CF at the age of 18, finishing his first season in La Liga – he only competed in that level during his career – with 24 games and three goals. In the summer of 1966 he joined RCD Español after rejecting offers from Inter Milan, Real Madrid and FC Barcelona.

In his first season with the Pericos, Marcial scored 11 goals in 29 contests to help the club to a best-ever third place in the league, but suffered team relegation in his third year, which did not prevent, however, his signing for neighbouring Barcelona, where he went on to appear in 357 official matches during his eight-year spell, netting 84 goals; in 1973–74, as the Catalans won the national championship, he was the competition's second-best scorer at 17, only trailing Sporting de Gijón's Quini.

In 1977, Marcial left the Blaugrana after having been suspended by the club during the previous campaign due to a breach of regulations alongside teammate Carles Rexach, who remained at the Camp Nou, however. He then joined Atlético Madrid for a further three top flight seasons, retiring at the end of 1979–80 (aged nearly 34) after only appearing in nine games for the capital side.

Marcial held the curious record of being the only player to have scored against Real Madrid with four different teams. In 1986, he returned to first club Elche to work in directorial capacities, then had two coaching spells with the latter in the following decades, including ten games in the second division in the 2000–01 season, with the Valencians retaining their status in dramatic fashion in the last round with a 2–2 home draw against SD Compostela, which would drop down a level instead.

== International career ==
Marcial played 15 times with the Spain national team. His debut was on 23 October 1966 against the Republic of Ireland, a 0–0 away draw for the UEFA Euro 1968 qualifiers.

== Honours ==
Barcelona

- La Liga: 1973–74
- Copa del Generalísimo: 1970-71
- Inter-Cities Fairs Cup: 1971
