= Salvador Sadurní =

Spanish footballer

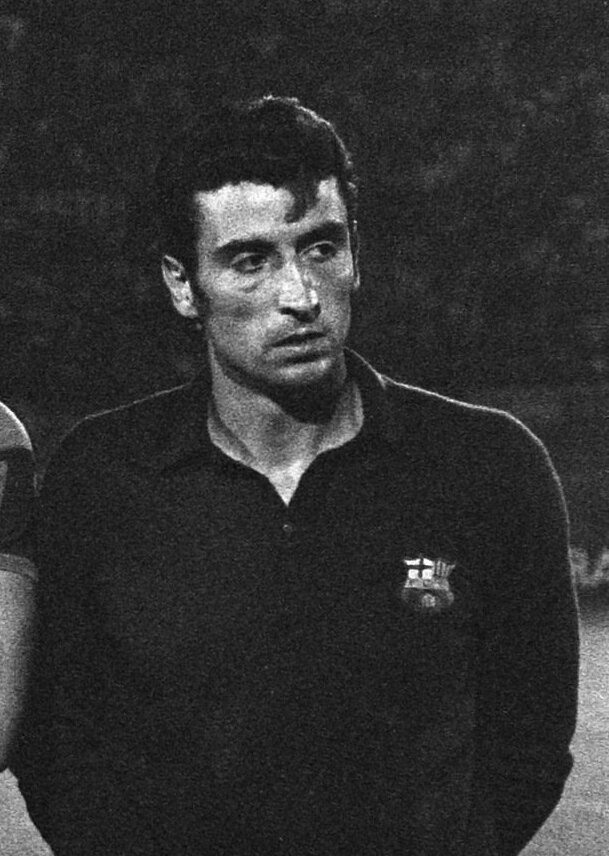
- Sadurní in 1975

Personal information
- Full name: Salvador Sadurní Urpí
- Date of birth: 3 April 1941 (age 85)
- Place of birth: L'Arboç, Spain
- Height: 1.80 m (5 ft 11 in)
- Position: Goalkeeper

Youth career
- 1956–1957: Vendrell
- 1957–1960: Barcelona

Senior career*
Years	Team	Apps	(Gls)
1960–1976	Barcelona	247	(0)
1960–1961	→ Mataró (loan)		

International career
1963–1969	Spain	10	(0)
1968–1971	Catalonia	2	(0)
Medal record
Representing Spain
UEFA European Championship
Winner	1964 Spain
- * Club domestic league appearances and goals

Salvador Sadurní Urpí (born 3 April 1941) is a Spanish retired footballer who played as a goalkeeper.

== Club career ==
Sadurní was born in L'Arboç, Tarragona, Catalonia. After one season on loan to neighbours CE Mataró he returned to alma mater FC Barcelona, where he remained for the rest of his 16-year career. He appeared in nine games in his first season in La Liga, and engaged in a battle for first-choice status with José Manuel Pesudo in the following years, subsequently becoming the undisputed starter.

In 1969, Sadurní lost his starting position to Miguel Reina, but regained it four years later after the latter left for Atlético Madrid. In the 1973–74 campaign he won the second of his third Ricardo Zamora Trophy awards, as Barça won the national championship and finished with the best defensive record in the competition (just 24 goals conceded in 34 matches); he retired at the age of 35, after a testimonial match against Stade de Reims.

== International career ==
Sadurní earned ten caps for Spain during six and a half years, his debut coming on 9 January 1963 in a friendly against France held at the familiar Camp Nou (0–0). He was a backup for the national team at both the 1962 FIFA World Cup and 1964 European Nations' Cup tournaments, and his last appearance was on 25 June 1969, in a 0–2 loss in Finland for the 1970 World Cup qualifiers.

== Honours ==
=== Club ===
Barcelona

- La Liga: 1973–74
- Copa del Generalísimo: 1962–63, 1967–68, 1970–71
- Inter-Cities Fairs Cup: 1965–66, 1971 Trophy Play-Off

=== International ===
Spain

- European Nations' Cup: 1964

=== Individual ===
- Ricardo Zamora Trophy: 1968–69, 1973–74, 1974–75
