= Joaquim Rifé =

Spanish footballer and manager

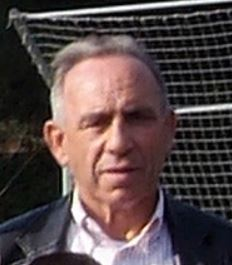
- Joaquim Rifé

Personal information
- Full name: Joaquim Rifé Climent
- Date of birth: 4 February 1942 (age 84)
- Place of birth: Barcelona, Spain
- Height: 1.73 m (5 ft 8 in)
- Position: Midfielder

Senior career*
Years	Team	Apps	(Gls)
1962–1963	Gimnàstic	X	(X)
1963–1976	Barcelona	290	(23)

International career
1968–1970	Spain	4	(1)

Managerial career
- 1979–1980: Barcelona
- 1981: Levante
- * Club domestic league appearances and goals

Joaquim Rifé Climent (born 4 February 1942 in Barcelona, Catalonia) is a Spanish former footballer who played as a midfielder and captained Barcelona, playing a total of 548 matches for the club. He played in the Barcelona first team for 12 seasons, between 1964 and 1976.

Following his retirement as a player, he became one of the team trainers; at the end of the 1978–79 season, he took charge of the team along with Torres. This duo helped the team to attain The Recopa of Basilea.

He ranks ninth among players, by number of starts, in the history of Barcelona.

His brother Llorenç was also a footballer.

== Honours ==
=== Player ===
Barcelona

- 1 La Liga: 1973–74.
- 2 Copa del Rey: 1967–68, 1970–71.
- 2 Inter-Cities Fairs Cup: 1965–66, 1971 Trophy Play-Off

=== Manager ===
Barcelona

- 1 UEFA Cup Winners' Cup: 1978–79.
