= 1970–71 Copa del Generalísimo =

69th Copa del Rey

Tournament details
- Country: Spain
- Teams: 103

Final positions
- Champions: FC Barcelona (17th title)
- Runners-up: Valencia CF

Tournament statistics
- Matches played: 203

The 1970–71 Copa del Generalísimo was the 69th staging of the Spanish Cup football competition. It began on 14 October 1970 and concluded on 4 July 1971 with the final.

== First round ==
Team 1	Agg.	Team 2	1st leg	2nd leg
SD Ibiza	1–3	CD Cartagena	1–0	0–3
CD Español	1–7	Tarrasa CF	1–3	1–4
AD Plus Ultra	2–3	CD Orense	1–1	1–2
Mérida Industrial CF	3–1	RCD Carabanchel	1–0	2–1
Paiporta CF	0–1	Xerez CD	0–1	0–0
Triana Balompié	1–3	Tenerife Atlético Club	1–2	0–1
Racing Club Portuense	2–5	CF Gandía	2–1	0–4
Imperial CF	(a) 2–2	Gimnástico de Tarragona	1–0	1–2
Atlético Baleares	0–1	Real Murcia	0–0	0–1
CD Ilicitano	3–3 (a)	UD Poblense	3–1	0–2
CD Mestalla	2–1	Melilla CF	2–0	0–1
CD Acero	3–5	Sevilla Atlético	2–1	1–4
CD Alcoyano	1–4	Recreativo de Huelva	1–2	0–2
Atlético Malagueño	0–3	Algemesí CF	0–0	0–3
CD Valdepeñas	3–2	CD Tortosa	2–1	1–1
Balompédica Linense	1–2	CD Badajoz	0–0	1–2
AD Ceuta	7–5	Levante UD	5–2	2–3
CD Lugo	0–3	UD Salamanca	0–2	0–1
Real Valladolid	8–3	SD Ponferradina	7–1	1–2
La Bañeza FC	3–7	Palencia CF	2–2	1–5
SD Eibar	0–2	Cultural Leonesa	0–0	0–2
SD Vetusta	2–2 (4–5 p)	CD Mirandés	1–1	1–1
CA Osasuna	(a) 1–1	Real Avilés	0–0	1–1
CD Talavera	3–1	Caudal Deportivo	3–0	0–1
CD Ensidesa	2–3	Real Madrid Aficionados	1–1	1–2
Sestao SC	5–4	CF Badalona	4–1	1–3
CD Mataró	3–5	SD Huesca	2–1	1–4
CD Tudelano	0–3	Gimnástica de Torrelavega	0–1	0–2
CF Calella	3–1	San Sebastián CF	1–0	2–1
SDC Michelín	4–1	CD Europa	2–0	2–1
CF Barcelona Atlético	1–4	Bilbao Atlético	1–4	0–0
Real Unión	3–2	CD Júpiter	2–0	1–2
Gerona CF	2–2 (4–5 p)	Baracaldo CF	1–1	1–1

- Bye: Real Jaén.

== Second round ==
Team 1	Agg.	Team 2	1st leg	2nd leg
Baracaldo CF	3–0	UD Poblense	2–0	1–0
Gimnástica de Torrelavega	3–3 (a)	Imperial CF	3–1	0–2
Palencia CF	1–5	Real Unión	1–3	0–2
SD Huesca	0–3	Mérida Industrial CF	0–0	0–3
AD Ceuta	2–6	CD Mestalla	2–2	0–4
Recreativo de Huelva	3–4	Tarrasa CF	1–0	2–4
CD Talavera	0–4	Real Valladolid	0–0	0–4
CD Orense	3–0	Algemesí CF	2–0	1–0
Sevilla Atlético	4–5	CD Mirandés	3–1	1–4
Xerez CD	3–1	Sestao SC	1–0	2–1
CF Gandía	3–2	Real Madrid Aficionados	3–0	0–2
CF Valdepeñas	0–4	CF Calella	0–2	0–2
CD Cartagena	3–1	CD Badajoz	2–0	1–1
Bilbao Atlético	4–2	Real Jaén	2–2	2–0

- Bye: Real Murcia, SDC Michelín, UD Salamanca, CA Osasuna, Cultural Leonesa and Tenerife Atlético Club.

== Third round ==
Team 1	Agg.	Team 2	1st leg	2nd leg
Real Betis	3–1	Real Unión	3–0	0–1
Bilbao Atlético	1–3	Club Ferrol	0–1	1–2
Burgos CF	2–3	Tenerife Atlético Club	2–0	0–3
Cádiz CF	0–2	CA Osasuna	0–1	0–1
Calvo Sotelo CF	3–2	Xerez CD	2–1	1–1
CD Cartagena	2–2 (a)	Rayo Vallecano	2–1	0–1
Córdoba CF	1–3	CF Calella	1–0	0–3
Deportivo La Coruña	4–2	UD Salamanca	4–0	0–2
CF Gandía	0–3	Hércules CF	0–1	0–2
Imperial CF	0–2	UP Langreo	0–0	0–2
CD Logroñés	5–3	CD Mirandés	4–2	1–1
RCD Mallorca	2–1	Real Murcia	1–1	1–0
CD Mestalla	3–5	CD San Andrés	2–1	1–4
SDC Michelín	1–3	Real Oviedo	1–2	0–1
CD Colonia Moscardó	1–2	Cultural Leonesa	1–0	0–2
CD Orense	2–2 (a)	Pontevedra CF	1–2	1–0
Real Santander	0–3	Baracaldo CF	0–2	0–1
Tarrasa CF	0–3	CD Castellón	0–0	0–3
Real Valladolid	1–3	Onteniente CF	1–1	0–2
Villarreal CF	5–1	Mérida Industrial CF	5–0	0–1

Source: RSSSF

== Fourth round ==
Team 1	Agg.	Team 2	1st leg	2nd leg
Baracaldo CF	4–2	Hércules CF	4–0	0–2
CF Calella	4–2	Cultural Leonesa	4–0	0–2
Calvo Sotelo CF	0–5	CD San Andrés	0–0	0–5
Rayo Vallecano	4–2	Onteniente CF	2–0	2–2

Source: RSSSF

- Bye: Real Betis, Club Ferrol, Tenerife Atlético Club, CA Osasuna, Deportivo La Coruña, UP Langreo, CD Logroñés, RCD Mallorca, Real Oviedo, Pontevedra CF, CD Castellón and Villarreal CF.

== Round of 32 ==
Team 1	Agg.	Team 2	1st leg	2nd leg
Baracaldo CF	2–5	Real Zaragoza	0–2	2–3
Real Betis	0–0 (4–1 p)	RCD Español	0–0	0–0
CD Castellón	0–2	Celta Vigo	0–2	0–0
Elche CF	4–2	CF Calella	4–1	0–1
Club Ferrol	1–4	Club Atlético de Bilbao	1–3	0–1
Granada CF	3–1	UP Langreo	3–1	0–0
UD Las Palmas	4–0	Tenerife Atlético Club	2–0	2–0
Real Madrid CF	1–1 (a)	Deportivo La Coruña	1–1	0–0
RCD Mallorca	4–6	Valencia CF	1–1	3–5
Real Oviedo	0–4	Club Atlético de Madrid	0–0	0–4
Pontevedra CF	1–2	Sevilla CF	0–0	1–2
Real Sociedad	1–0	CA Osasuna	1–0	0–0
CD Sabadell CF	1–2	CD Logroñés	1–0	0–2
CD San Andrés	3–2	Real Gijón	2–1	1–1
Rayo Vallecano	1–3	CD Málaga	0–0	1–3
Villarreal CF	1–2	CF Barcelona	1–0	0–2

Source: RSSSF

== Round of 16 ==
Team 1	Agg.	Team 2	1st leg	2nd leg
Club Atlético de Bilbao	1–3	CF Barcelona	1–0	0–3
Deportivo La Coruña	2–0	Celta de Vigo	0–0	2–0
Granada CF	3–4	Sevilla CF	1–1	2–3
CD Logroñés	1–3	Club Atlético de Madrid	0–2	1–1
CD Málaga	3–0	UD Las Palmas	2–0	1–0
CD San Andrés	2–1	Elche CF	2–1	0–0
Valencia CF	4–0	Real Betis	0–0	4–0
Real Zaragoza	0–1	Real Sociedad	0–1	0–0

Source: RSSSF

== Quarter-finals ==
Team 1	Agg.	Team 2	1st leg	2nd leg
CF Barcelona	4–0	Deportivo La Coruña	4–0	0–0
CD Málaga	1–4	Valencia CF	0–1	1–3
Real Sociedad	3–6	Club Atlético de Madrid	3–2	0–4
Sevilla CF	2–1	CD San Andrés	2–0	0–1

Source: RSSSF

== Semi-finals ==
Team 1	Agg.	Team 2	1st leg	2nd leg
Club Atlético de Madrid	1–2	CF Barcelona	0–1	1–1
Valencia CF	4–0	Sevilla CF	2–0	2–0

Source: RSSSF

== Final ==
Team 1	Score	Team 2
CF Barcelona	4–3 (aet)	Valencia CF

Copa del Generalísimo
winners
FC Barcelona
17th title
