= 1973–74 La Liga =

43rd season of La Liga

Primera División
- Season: 1973–74
- Champions: Barcelona (9th title)
- Relegated: Castellón; Racing Santander; Oviedo
- European Cup: Barcelona
- Cup Winners' Cup: Real Madrid
- UEFA Cup: Atlético Madrid; Zaragoza; Real Sociedad
- Matches: 306
- Goals: 710 (2.32 per match)
- Top goalscorer: Quini (20 goals)

The 1973–74 La Liga was the 43rd season since its establishment. It began on 1 September 1973, and concluded on 20 May 1974.

== Team locations ==
Location of teams in La Liga 1973–74
Canary Islands

Team	Home city	Stadium
Athletic Bilbao	Bilbao	San Mamés
Atlético Madrid	Madrid	Vicente Calderón
Barcelona	Barcelona	Nou Camp
Castellón	Castellón de la Plana	Castalia
Celta	Vigo	Balaídos
Elche	Elche	Altabix
Español	Barcelona	Sarriá
Granada	Granada	Los Cármenes
Las Palmas	Las Palmas	Insular
Málaga	Málaga	La Rosaleda
Murcia	Murcia	La Condomina
Oviedo	Oviedo	Carlos Tartiere
Racing Santander	Santander	El Sardinero
Real Madrid	Madrid	Santiago Bernabéu
Real Sociedad	San Sebastián	Atocha
Sporting Gijón	Gijón	El Molinón
Valencia	Valencia	Luis Casanova
Zaragoza	Zaragoza	La Romareda

== League table ==
Pos	Team	Pld	W	D	L	GF	GA	GD	Pts	Qualification or relegation
1	Barcelona (C)	34	21	8	5	75	24	+51	50	Qualification for the European Cup first round
2	Atlético Madrid	34	16	8	10	50	31	+19	40	Qualification for the UEFA Cup first round
3	Zaragoza	34	16	7	11	51	38	+13	39	Qualification for the UEFA Cup first round
4	Real Sociedad	34	15	8	11	46	45	+1	38	Qualification for the UEFA Cup first round
5	Athletic Bilbao	34	15	7	12	35	31	+4	37	
6	Granada	34	12	12	10	34	35	−1	36	
7	Málaga	34	12	12	10	31	32	−1	36	
8	Real Madrid	34	13	8	13	48	38	+10	34	Qualification for the Cup Winners' Cup first round (Note: Real Madrid qualified to the Cup Winners' Cup as champions of the Copa del Generalísimo.)
9	Español	34	13	8	13	34	38	−4	34	
10	Valencia	34	13	7	14	41	33	+8	33	
11	Las Palmas	34	14	5	15	28	35	−7	33	
12	Celta Vigo	34	12	6	16	43	49	−6	30	
13	Sporting Gijón	34	13	4	17	49	59	−10	30	
14	Elche	34	11	7	16	25	33	−8	29	
15	Murcia	34	10	9	15	27	37	−10	29	
16	Castellón (R)	34	9	11	14	28	46	−18	29	Relegation to the Segunda División
17	Oviedo (R)	34	8	11	15	36	54	−18	27	Relegation to the Segunda División
18	Racing Santander (R)	34	9	6	19	29	52	−23	24	Relegation to the Segunda División

Source: BDFútbol
Rules for classification: 1) Points; 2) Head-to-head results; 3) Goal difference; 4) Number of goals scored
(C) Champions; (R) Relegated

== Results table ==
Home \ Away	ATB	ATM	BAR	CAS	CEL	ELC	ESP	GRA	LPA	MLG	MUR	RGI	RMA	ROV	RSA	RSO	VAL	ZAR
Atlético Bilbao		2–2	0–0	2–0	2–0	2–1	1–0	1–0	2–1	1–0	3–0	2–3	2–1	2–0	3–1	1–2	1–0	2–1
Atlético Madrid	1–0		2–0	0–0	2–0	2–1	5–1	2–1	3–1	2–0	4–1	2–0	0–2	1–0	2–1	5–1	3–1	0–0
FC Barcelona	2–0	2–1		5–0	5–2	2–0	3–0	4–0	3–0	4–0	1–0	5–1	0–0	6–2	0–0	4–1	1–0	2–0
CD Castellón	0–0	1–1	0–2		1–1	0–2	3–2	1–1	1–1	1–0	1–0	3–2	2–0	2–0	1–1	2–0	0–0	2–1
Celta de Vigo	2–1	1–3	2–1	0–1		1–0	1–2	1–0	3–1	5–1	0–2	1–0	2–1	5–1	1–0	3–0	0–2	2–0
Elche CF	0–0	0–0	1–0	1–0	2–0		0–0	1–0	1–0	0–1	1–0	1–0	1–0	1–1	0–0	1–2	1–0	1–1
RCD Español	2–0	1–0	0–0	1–0	1–0	1–1		1–1	2–0	1–1	3–0	3–0	1–0	2–0	0–2	1–0	1–0	3–1
Granada CF	0–0	1–0	1–1	2–0	2–1	2–1	2–0		2–1	0–0	1–1	1–0	1–1	3–0	2–0	2–1	2–2	1–2
UD Las Palmas	1–0	1–0	1–0	2–0	1–0	3–1	1–1	1–1		1–0	3–0	1–0	1–0	1–2	2–0	1–0	0–0	1–0
CD Málaga	1–0	1–2	0–0	2–1	1–1	3–1	1–1	1–1	1–0		1–0	2–0	1–0	1–0	3–0	2–0	1–0	0–1
Murcia	0–0	1–0	2–2	3–1	2–2	0–1	1–0	0–0	0–1	0–0		2–1	0–1	3–1	2–0	1–1	1–0	1–0
Real Gijón	2–0	0–3	2–4	4–0	2–1	2–0	3–0	4–0	1–0	1–0	2–1		4–3	0–3	2–0	3–1	1–2	2–2
Real Madrid	1–0	2–0	0–5	0–0	6–1	1–0	2–1	0–1	5–0	0–0	1–1	2–2		2–0	3–2	3–1	2–1	4–0
Real Oviedo	0–1	2–0	1–3	0–0	1–1	1–0	1–0	3–0	1–0	1–1	0–1	0–0	1–1		2–1	0–2	1–2	1–0
Real Santander	2–2	2–1	1–3	1–1	1–1	2–1	1–1	2–0	1–0	1–1	2–0	3–3	2–1	2–0		0–0	0–1	1–1
Real Sociedad	2–1	0–0	2–1	3–1	2–1	2–1	3–0	0–2	0–0	1–1	2–1	2–1	2–2	2–0	4–1		3–2	2–0
Valencia CF	0–1	0–1	0–2	3–0	0–0	2–0	1–0	1–1	2–0	2–2	1–0	6–1	1–0	2–1	5–2	1–2		0–0
Zaragoza	3–0	4–0	2–2	3–2	2–1	2–1	3–1	1–0	2–0	3–1	0–0	3–0	2–1	4–2	5–1	0–0	2–1	

Legend: Blue = home team win; Yellow = draw; Red = away team win.

== Pichichi Trophy ==
Rank	Player	Club	Goals
1	(Spain) Quini	Sporting Gijón	20
2	(Spain) Marcial Pina	Barcelona	17
2	(Paraguay) Saturnino Arrúa	Zaragoza	17
4	(Netherlands) Johan Cruyff	Barcelona	16
5	(Spain) Fernando Ansola	Real Sociedad	12
5	(Spain) Rafael de Diego	Español	12
5	(Spain) Enrique Galán	Oviedo	12
5	(Spain) Marianín	Oviedo	12
