= List of FC Barcelona seasons =

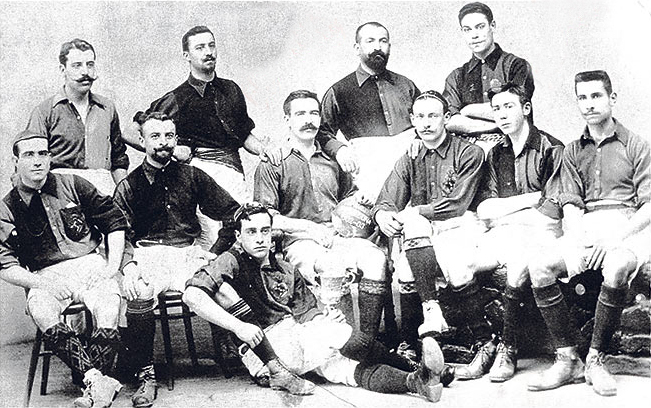
Barcelona team in 1903

Futbol Club Barcelona is a professional association football club based in Barcelona, Catalonia, Spain. The club was founded in 1899 by a group of Swiss, Catalan, German, and English footballers led by Joan Gamper, and played its first friendly match on 8 December 1899. Initially, Barcelona played against other local clubs in various Catalan tournaments, but in 1929 the club became one of the founding members of La Liga, Spain's first national league. As of 2026, Barcelona is one of only three clubs to have never been relegated from the top level of Spanish football, the others being Athletic Bilbao and Real Madrid.

In the period from 1919 to 1929, Barça won the Copa del Rey five times and the Campionat de Catalunya nine times. Barcelona enjoyed a successful start in La Liga, winning the championship in the competition's first season. However, they did not win the league again until 1945. Three seasons prior to that, Barcelona finished twelfth, which remains, as of 2026, the club's lowest league finish. Barcelona won five trophies in the 1951–52 season, becoming known as "Barça of the Five Cups" (Catalan: el Barça de les Cinc Copes), and went on to win La Liga three times, the Copa del Rey five times and the Inter-Cities Fairs Cup once during the 1950s. The club then entered a lean spell, with only two league titles between 1960 and 1990. In 1988, former legendary player Johan Cruyff was appointed manager and assembled what would later be known as the "Dream Team". In 1991, he led the club to its first league title in six years and repeated the feat the following season when Barça also won the European Cup for the first time. In the 1993–94 season, Barcelona won their fourth consecutive league title, edging out Deportivo de La Coruña on goal difference after the two clubs finished level on points.

Newly elected president Joan Laporta's appointment of Frank Rijkaard as coach and the signing of Ronaldinho in 2003 marked the beginning of another spell of sustained success. In 2005, Barcelona once again won La Liga championship, and retained it the following season. In May 2006, Barcelona defeated Arsenal in the Champions League final, coming back from 0–1 to win 2–1 in the last fifteen minutes. Three years later, the club beat Manchester United 2–0 in the 2009 Champions League final, having already won La Liga and the Copa del Rey that season, to become the first Spanish side to complete the treble. In December 2009, Barcelona won the Club World Cup, having also won the Spanish and European Super Cups, thereby completing an unprecedented sextuple.

The club has won La Liga 29 times, the Copa del Rey 32 times, the Copa de la Liga twice, the Supercopa de España 16 times, the Copa Eva Duarte three times, the Champions League five times, the Cup Winners' Cup four times, the Fairs Cup three times, the Super Cup five times and the Club World Cup three times. The table details the club's achievements in the early regional championships and in all national and international first-team competitions for each completed season since the club's formation in 1899.

== Key ==
Key to league:

- Pos. = Final position
- Pld = Matches played
- W = Matches won
- D = Matches drawn
- W= Matches won
- GF = Goals for
- GA = Goals against
- Pts = Points

Key to rounds:

- C = Champions
- F = Final (Runners-up)
- SF = Semi-finals
- QF = Quarter-finals
- R16/R32 = Round of 16, Round of 32
- KPO = Knockout phase play-offs
- GS = Group stage
- LP = League phase
- 1R, 2R, nR = First round, Second round, etc.

Champions	Runners-up

Top scorers shown in italics with number of goals scored in bold are players who were also top scorers in La Liga that season.

== Seasons ==
=== Pre-La Liga era ===
During this period Spain did not have a national football league. Barcelona competed in the championship of the Catalonia region, the winners of which qualified for the Copa del Rey along with the other regional champions. Barcelona also won the Pyrenees Cup, the first competition played between European clubs, four times (1910, 1911, 1912, 1913).

Season	Copa del Rey	Regional league								
Season	Copa del Rey	Competition	Pos.	Pld	W	D	L	GF	GA	Pts
1899–1900	FC Barcelona did not play competitive football.									
1900–01	–	Copa Macaya	2nd	6	4	1	1	47	3	9
1901–02	F	Copa Macaya	**C**	8	8	0	0	60	2	16
1902–03	–	Copa Barcelona (Note: Barcelona withdrew from the Copa Macaya in protest after having two points deducted for fielding an ineligible player, and organised the Copa Barcelona instead.)	**C**	14	12	2	0	45	10	26
1903–04	–	Campionat de Catalunya	4th	16	10	3	3	57	15	23
1904–05	– (Note: The winners of the Campionat de Catalunya should have qualified for the Copa del Rey, but the tournament was not completed in time.)	Campionat de Catalunya	**C**	8	5	2	1	21	12	12
1905–06	–	Campionat de Catalunya	3rd	6	3	0	3	16	10	6
1906–07	–	Campionat de Catalunya	F	n/a (Note: The league championship was not completed due to a series of protests over the result of a match between Barcelona and X Sporting Club. The authorities instead ordered these two teams to play-off for the championship. Barcelona lost the match 3–1.)						
1907–08	–	Campionat de Catalunya	2nd	6	4	1	1	18	6	9
1908–09	SF	Campionat de Catalunya	**C**	7	4	3	0	16	7	11
1909–10	**C**	Campionat de Catalunya	**C**	10	10	0	0	46	3	20
1910–11	QF	Campionat de Catalunya	**C**	7	7	0	0	25	7	14
1911–12	**C**	Campionat de Catalunya	3rd	10	6	2	2	51	8	14
1912–13	**C**	Campionat de Catalunya FAC (Note: Several clubs, including Barcelona, broke away from the existing governing body of football in Catalonia and formed a rival group, which organised its own championship. This competition was abandoned after only four games, but Barcelona were declared champions.)	**C**	4	3	0	1	24	9	6
1913–14	–	Campionat de Catalunya	4th	8	5	0	3	n/a	n/a	10
1914–15	–	Campionat de Catalunya	F (Note: Barcelona finished level on points with RCD Espanyol and the two teams were ordered to play-off for the championship. Barcelona lost the match 4–0.)	9	8	0	1	24	6	16
1915–16	SF	Campionat de Catalunya	**C**	13	13	0	0	64	12	26
1916–17	–	Campionat de Catalunya	3rd	8	4	2	2	16	8	10
1917–18	–	Campionat de Catalunya	3rd	10	6	1	3	17	11	13
1918–19	**F**	Campionat de Catalunya	**C**	10	8	1	1	31	6	17
1919–20	**C**	Campionat de Catalunya	**C**	10	9	1	0	28	7	19
1920–21	– (Note: Barcelona withdrew in protest at the decision of the Spanish football authorities to move the site of the final from Seville to Bilbao.)	Campionat de Catalunya	**C**	10	6	3	1	17	8	15
1921–22	**C**	Campionat de Catalunya	**C**	10	9	1	0	63	8	19
1922–23	–	Campionat de Catalunya	F (Note: Barcelona finished level on points with CE Europa at the top of the table and the two teams were ordered to play-off for the championship. Barcelona lost the match 1–0.)	10	8	1	1	24	9	17
1923–24	SF	Campionat de Catalunya	**C**	10	10	0	0	28	7	20
1924–25	**C**	Campionat de Catalunya	**C**	14	9	2	3	25	9	20
1925–26	**C**	Campionat de Catalunya	**C**	14	9	2	3	35	11	20
1926–27	SF	Campionat de Catalunya	**C**	14	11	1	2	64	20	23
1927–28	**C**	Campionat de Catalunya	**C** (Note: Barcelona finished level on points with CE Europa at the top of the table and the two teams were ordered to play-off for the championship. Barcelona won the match 1–0.)	14	12	0	2	56	11	24

=== La Liga era ===
In 1929, La Liga, Spain's first national football league, was formed, with Barcelona among the founding members. The club also competed in the Catalan championship until it was abandoned in 1940. The Copa del Rey continued alongside La Liga. Clubs continued to qualify for it based on their placings in the regional championships until 1940, when it became open to all teams in the top two divisions of the Spanish League and selected other teams. (* Barcelona also won the Mediterranean League in 1937.)

Season	League									Copa del Rey	Europe		Other competitions		Top league scorer(s) (Note: Only includes goals scored in La Liga.)	
Season	Division	Pld	W	D	L	GF	GA	Pts	Pos.	Copa del Rey	Europe		Other competitions		Player(s)	Goals
1928–29	La Liga	18	11	3	4	37	23	**25**	**1st**	SF					Parera	11
1928–29	Camp. Cat.	10	5	2	3	23	13	12	3rd	SF					Parera	11
1929–30	La Liga	18	11	1	6	46	36	**23**	2nd	SF					Bestit	12
1929–30	Camp. Cat.	10	8	0	2	33	6	16	**C**	SF					Bestit	12
1930–31	La Liga	18	7	7	4	40	43	**21**	4th	R16					Arocha	16
1930–31	Camp. Cat.	10	8	1	1	34	10	17	**C**	R16					Arocha	16
1931–32	La Liga	18	10	1	4	40	26	**24**	3rd	F					Samitier	10
1931–32	Camp. Cat.	14	11	1	2	43	11	23	**C**	F					Samitier	10
1932–33	La Liga	18	7	5	6	42	34	**19**	4th	R32					Ramón	12
1932–33	Camp. Cat.	14	12	1	1	53	15	25	2nd	R32					Ramón	12
1933–34	La Liga	18	8	0	10	42	40	**16**	9th	QF					Ventolrà	14
1933–34	Camp. Cat.	14	9	2	3	36	19	20	3rd	QF					Ventolrà	14
1934–35	La Liga	22	9	6	7	55	44	**24**	6th	QF					Escolà	18
1934–35	Camp. Cat.	10	8	1	1	36	10	17	**C**	QF					Escolà	18
1935–36	La Liga	22	11	2	9	39	32	**24**	5th	F					Escolà	13
1935–36	Camp. Cat.	10	9	1	0	41	9	19	**C**	F					Escolà	13
1936–37	Med. League	14	7	6	1	27	15	20	**C**							
1936–37	Camp. Cat.	10	5	2	3	24	16	12	2nd							
1937–38	Liga Catalana	17	14	1	2	86	26	29	**C**							
1937–38	Camp. Cat.	14	10	1	3	42	13	21	**C**							
1938–39	FC Barcelona did not play competitive football.															
1939–40	La Liga	22	8	3	11	32	38	**19**	9th	QF					Herrerita	8
1939–40	Camp. Cat.	10	5	0	5	29	20	10	3rd	QF					Herrerita	8
1940–41	La Liga	22	13	1	8	55	45	**27**	4th	R16					Martín	12
1941–42	La Liga	26	8	3	15	57	66	**19**	12th	**C**					Martín	17
1942–43	La Liga	26	14	4	8	77	50	**32**	3rd	SF					Martín	**30**
1943–44	La Liga	26	10	8	8	59	46	**28**	6th	R16					Martín	24
1944–45	La Liga	26	17	5	4	50	30	**39**	**1st**	R16					Escolà	16
1945–46	La Liga	26	14	7	5	48	31	**35**	2nd	R16					César	11
1946–47	La Liga	26	14	3	9	59	42	**31**	4th	QF					César Seguer	10
1947–48	La Liga	26	15	7	4	65	31	**37**	**1st**	R16					César	19
1948–49	La Liga	26	16	5	5	66	36	**37**	**1st**	SF			Copa Eva Duarte	**C**	César	**28**
1948–49	La Liga	26	16	5	5	66	36	**37**	**1st**	SF			Latin Cup	**C**	César	**28**
1949–50	La Liga	26	13	3	10	67	47	**29**	5th	R16			Copa Eva Duarte	F	César	19
1950–51	La Liga	30	16	3	11	83	61	**35**	4th	**C**					César	29
1951–52	La Liga	30	19	5	6	92	43	**43**	**1st**	**C**			Copa Eva Duarte	F	Kubala	26
1951–52	La Liga	30	19	5	6	92	43	**43**	**1st**	**C**			Latin Cup	**C**	Kubala	26
1952–53	La Liga	30	19	4	7	82	43	**42**	**1st**	**C**			Copa Eva Duarte (Note: FC Barcelona automatically received the trophy as it won the league championship and the Copa del Rey.)	**C**	Moreno	22
1953–54	La Liga	30	16	4	10	74	39	**36**	2nd	F			Copa Eva Duarte	**C**	Kubala	23
1954–55	La Liga	30	17	7	6	75	39	**41**	2nd	SF					Kubala Villaverde	14
1955–56	La Liga	30	22	3	5	67	26	**47**	2nd	QF	Fairs Cup	**C**			Kubala	14
1956–57	La Liga	30	16	7	7	70	37	**39**	3rd	**C**	Fairs Cup	**C**			Suárez	13
1957–58	La Liga	30	17	4	9	69	38	**38**	3rd	SF	Fairs Cup	**C**			Tejada	14
1958–59	La Liga	30	24	3	3	96	26	**51**	**1st**	**C**	Fairs Cup	**C**			Evaristo	20
1959–60	La Liga	30	22	2	6	86	28	**46**	**1st**	QF	Fairs Cup	**C**			Martínez	23
1959–60	La Liga	30	22	2	6	86	28	**46**	**1st**	QF	European Cup	SF			Martínez	23
1960–61	La Liga	30	13	6	11	62	47	**32**	4th	R16	Fairs Cup	QF			Evaristo	11
1960–61	La Liga	30	13	6	11	62	47	**32**	4th	R16	European Cup	F			Evaristo	11
1961–62	La Liga	30	18	4	8	81	46	**40**	2nd	QF	Fairs Cup	F			Evaristo	20
1962–63	La Liga	30	11	9	10	45	36	**31**	6th	**C**	Fairs Cup	2R			Zaldúa	10
1963–64	La Liga	30	19	4	7	74	38	**42**	2nd	SF	Cup Winners' Cup	1R			Ré	17
1964–65	La Liga	30	14	4	12	59	41	**32**	6th	QF	Fairs Cup	3R (Note: The format of the 1964–65 Fairs Cup meant that there were only twelve teams remaining at what would otherwise have been the round of 16, of which six, rather than the usual eight, qualified for the quarter-finals.)			Ré	**25**
1965–66	La Liga	30	16	6	8	51	27	**38**	3rd	SF	Fairs Cup	**C**			Rifé	9
1966–67	La Liga	30	20	2	8	58	29	**42**	2nd	R16	Fairs Cup	2R			Fusté Zaballa	10
1967–68	La Liga	30	15	9	6	48	29	**39**	2nd	**C**	Fairs Cup	1R			Zaldúa	12
1968–69	La Liga	30	13	10	7	40	18	**36**	3rd	R16	Cup Winners' Cup	F			Zaldúa	11
1969–70	La Liga	30	13	9	8	40	31	**35**	4th	QF	Fairs Cup	R16			Rexach	7
1970–71	La Liga	30	19	5	6	50	22	**43**	2nd	**C**	Fairs Cup	2R			Rexach	**17**
1971–72	La Liga	34	17	9	8	40	26	**43**	3rd	QF	Cup Winners' Cup	2R			Asensi	9
1972–73	La Liga	34	18	10	6	41	21	**46**	2nd	R16	UEFA Cup	1R			Barrios	8
1973–74	La Liga	34	21	8	5	75	24	**50**	**1st**	F	UEFA Cup	1R			Marcial	17
1974–75	La Liga	34	15	7	12	57	36	**37**	3rd	QF	European Cup	SF			Clares	10
1975–76	La Liga	34	18	7	9	61	41	**43**	2nd	QF	UEFA Cup	SF			Neeskens	12
1976–77	La Liga	34	18	9	7	69	34	**45**	2nd	R16	UEFA Cup	QF			Clares	22
1977–78	La Liga	34	16	9	9	49	29	**41**	2nd	**C**	UEFA Cup	SF			Asensi Rexach	9
1978–79	La Liga	34	16	6	12	69	37	**38**	5th	R16	Cup Winners' Cup	**C**			Krankl	**29**
1979–80	La Liga	34	13	12	9	42	33	**38**	4th	R16	Cup Winners' Cup	QF	UEFA Super Cup	F	Simonsen	10
1980–81	La Liga	34	18	5	11	66	41	**41**	5th	**C**	UEFA Cup	2R			Quini	**20**
1981–82	La Liga	34	19	7	8	75	40	**45**	2nd	R16	Cup Winners' Cup	**C**			Quini	**27**
1982–83	La Liga	34	17	10	7	60	29	**44**	4th	**C**	Cup Winners' Cup	QF	UEFA Super Cup	F	Maradona	11
1982–83	La Liga	34	17	10	7	60	29	**44**	4th	**C**	Cup Winners' Cup	QF	League Cup	**C**	Maradona	11
1983–84	La Liga	34	20	8	6	62	28	**48**	3rd	F	Cup Winners' Cup	QF	Supercopa de España	**C**	Marcos	12
1983–84	La Liga	34	20	8	6	62	28	**48**	3rd	F	Cup Winners' Cup	QF	League Cup	SF	Marcos	12
1984–85	La Liga	34	21	11	2	69	25	**53**	**1st**	QF	Cup Winners' Cup	1R	League Cup	QF	Archibald	15
1985–86	La Liga	34	18	9	7	61	36	**45**	2nd	F	European Cup	F	Supercopa de España	F	Schuster	10
1985–86	La Liga	34	18	9	7	61	36	**45**	2nd	F	European Cup	F	League Cup	**C**	Schuster	10
1986–87	La Liga	34	18	13	3	51	22	**49**	2nd	R16	UEFA Cup	QF			Lineker	20
1987–88	La Liga	38	15	9	14	49	44	**39**	6th	**C**	UEFA Cup	QF			Lineker	16
1988–89	La Liga	38	23	11	4	80	26	**57**	2nd	QF	Cup Winners' Cup	**C**	Supercopa de España	F	Salinas	20
1989–90	La Liga	38	23	5	10	83	39	**51**	3rd	**C**	Cup Winners' Cup	2R	UEFA Super Cup	F	Salinas	15
1990–91	La Liga	38	25	7	6	74	33	**57**	**1st**	SF	Cup Winners' Cup	F	Supercopa de España	F	Stoichkov	14
1991–92	La Liga	38	23	9	6	87	37	**55**	**1st**	R16	European Cup	**C**	Supercopa de España	**C**	Stoichkov	17
1992–93	La Liga	38	25	8	5	87	34	**58**	**1st**	SF	Champions League	2R	Supercopa de España	**C**	Stoichkov	20
1992–93	La Liga	38	25	8	5	87	34	**58**	**1st**	SF	Champions League	2R	UEFA Super Cup	**C**	Stoichkov	20
1992–93	La Liga	38	25	8	5	87	34	**58**	**1st**	SF	Champions League	2R	Intercontinental Cup	F	Stoichkov	20
1993–94	La Liga	38	25	6	7	91	42	**56**	**1st**	QF	Champions League	F	Supercopa de España	F	Romário	**30**
1994–95	La Liga	38	18	10	10	60	45	**46**	4th	R16	Champions League	QF	Supercopa de España	**C**	Cruyff Koeman Stoichkov	9
1995–96	La Liga	42	22	14	6	72	39	**80**	3rd	F	UEFA Cup	SF			García	10
1996–97	La Liga	42	28	6	8	102	48	**90**	2nd	**C**	Cup Winners' Cup	**C**	Supercopa de España	**C**	Ronaldo	**34** (Note: Ronaldo won both the title of La Liga top scorer (34 goals) and the European Golden Shoe.)
1997–98	La Liga	38	23	5	10	78	56	**74**	**1st**	**C**	Champions League	GS	Supercopa de España	F	Rivaldo	19
1997–98	La Liga	38	23	5	10	78	56	**74**	**1st**	**C**	Champions League	GS	UEFA Super Cup	**C**	Rivaldo	19
1998–99	La Liga	38	24	7	7	87	43	**79**	**1st**	QF	Champions League	GS	Supercopa de España	F	Rivaldo	24
1999–2000	La Liga	38	19	7	12	70	46	**64**	2nd	SF	Champions League	SF	Supercopa de España	F	Kluivert	15
2000–01	La Liga	38	17	12	9	80	57	**63**	4th	SF	Champions League	GS1 (Note: The contemporary format involved two group stages before a knockout phase; Barcelona was eliminated in the first group stage, transferring to the UEFA Cup.)			Rivaldo	23
2000–01	La Liga	38	17	12	9	80	57	**63**	4th	SF	UEFA Cup	SF			Rivaldo	23
2001–02	La Liga	38	18	10	10	65	37	**64**	4th	R64	Champions League	SF			Kluivert	18
2002–03	La Liga	38	15	11	12	63	47	**56**	6th	R64	Champions League	QF			Kluivert	16
2003–04	La Liga	38	21	9	8	63	39	**72**	2nd	QF	UEFA Cup	R16			Ronaldinho	15
2004–05	La Liga	38	25	9	4	73	29	**84**	**1st**	R64	Champions League	R16			Eto'o	25
2005–06	La Liga	38	25	7	6	80	35	**82**	**1st**	QF	Champions League	**C**	Supercopa de España	**C**	Eto'o	**26**
2006–07	La Liga	38	22	10	6	78	33	**76**	2nd	SF	Champions League	R16	Supercopa de España	**C**	Ronaldinho	21
2006–07	La Liga	38	22	10	6	78	33	**76**	2nd	SF	Champions League	R16	UEFA Super Cup	F	Ronaldinho	21
2006–07	La Liga	38	22	10	6	78	33	**76**	2nd	SF	Champions League	R16	FIFA Club World Cup	F	Ronaldinho	21
2007–08	La Liga	38	19	10	9	76	43	**67**	3rd	SF	Champions League	SF			Eto'o	16
2008–09	La Liga	38	27	6	5	105	35	**87**	**1st**	**C**	Champions League	**C**			Eto'o	30
2009–10	La Liga	38	31	6	1	98	24	**99**	**1st**	R16	Champions League	SF	Supercopa de España	**C**	Messi	**34** (Note: Messi won both the title of La Liga top scorer (34 goals) and the European Golden Shoe.)
2009–10	La Liga	38	31	6	1	98	24	**99**	**1st**	R16	Champions League	SF	UEFA Super Cup	**C**	Messi	**34**
2009–10	La Liga	38	31	6	1	98	24	**99**	**1st**	R16	Champions League	SF	FIFA Club World Cup	**C**	Messi	**34**
2010–11	La Liga	38	30	6	2	95	21	**96**	**1st**	F	Champions League	**C**	Supercopa de España	**C**	Messi	31
2011–12	La Liga	38	28	7	3	114	29	**91**	2nd	**C**	Champions League	SF	Supercopa de España	**C**	Messi	**50** (Note: Messi won both the title of La Liga top scorer (50 goals) and the European Golden Shoe.)
2011–12	La Liga	38	28	7	3	114	29	**91**	2nd	**C**	Champions League	SF	UEFA Super Cup	**C**	Messi	**50**
2011–12	La Liga	38	28	7	3	114	29	**91**	2nd	**C**	Champions League	SF	FIFA Club World Cup	**C**	Messi	**50**
2012–13	La Liga	38	32	4	2	115	40	**100**	**1st**	SF	Champions League	SF	Supercopa de España	F	Messi	**46** (Note: Messi won both the title of La Liga top scorer (46 goals) and the European Golden Shoe.)
2013–14	La Liga	38	27	6	5	100	33	**87**	2nd	F	Champions League	QF	Supercopa de España	**C**	Messi	28
2014–15	La Liga	38	30	4	4	110	21	**94**	**1st**	**C**	Champions League	**C**			Messi	43
2015–16	La Liga	38	29	4	5	112	29	**91**	**1st**	**C**	Champions League	QF	Supercopa de España	F	Suárez	**40** (Note: Suárez won both the title of La Liga top scorer (40 goals) and the European Golden Shoe.)
2015–16	La Liga	38	29	4	5	112	29	**91**	**1st**	**C**	Champions League	QF	UEFA Super Cup	**C**	Suárez	**40**
2015–16	La Liga	38	29	4	5	112	29	**91**	**1st**	**C**	Champions League	QF	FIFA Club World Cup	**C**	Suárez	**40**
2016–17	La Liga	38	28	6	4	116	37	**90**	2nd	**C**	Champions League	QF	Supercopa de España	**C**	Messi	**37** (Note: Messi won both the title of La Liga top scorer (37 goals) and the European Golden Shoe.)
2017–18	La Liga	38	28	9	1	99	29	**93**	**1st**	**C**	Champions League	QF	Supercopa de España	F	Messi	**34**
2018–19	La Liga	38	26	9	3	90	36	**87**	**1st**	F	Champions League	SF	Supercopa de España	**C**	Messi	**36** (Note: Messi won both the title of La Liga top scorer (36 goals) and the European Golden Shoe.)
2019–20	La Liga	38	25	7	6	86	38	**82**	2nd	QF	Champions League	QF	Supercopa de España	SF	Messi	**25**
2020–21	La Liga	38	24	7	7	85	38	**79**	3rd	**C**	Champions League	R16	Supercopa de España	F	Messi	**30**
2021–22	La Liga	38	21	10	7	68	38	**73**	2nd	R16	Champions League	GS	Supercopa de España	SF	Depay	12
2021–22	La Liga	38	21	10	7	68	38	**73**	2nd	R16	Europa League	QF	Supercopa de España	SF	Depay	12
2022–23	La Liga	38	28	4	6	70	20	**88**	**1st**	SF	Champions League	GS	Supercopa de España	**C**	Lewandowski	**23**
2022–23	La Liga	38	28	4	6	70	20	**88**	**1st**	SF	Europa League	KPO	Supercopa de España	**C**	Lewandowski	**23**
2023–24	La Liga	38	26	7	5	79	44	**85**	2nd	QF	Champions League	QF	Supercopa de España	F	Lewandowski	19
2024–25	La Liga	38	28	4	6	102	39	**88**	**1st**	**C**	Champions League	SF	Supercopa de España	**C**	Lewandowski	27
2025–26	La Liga	38	31	1	6	95	36	**94**	**1st**	SF	Champions League	QF	Supercopa de España	**C**	Torres Yamal	16
2026–27	La Liga	12	11	0	1	48	13	**33**	1st	R32	Champions League	LP	Supercopa de España	SF	Raphinha	15
