= 1969–70 FC Barcelona season =

71st season in existence of FC Barcelona

FC Barcelona
1969–70 season
- President: Narcís de Carreras(until 18 December 1969); Agustí Montal Costa
- Manager: Salvador Artigas(until 15 October 1969); Josep Seguer(until 24 December 1969); Vic Buckingham
- La Liga: Fifth
- Copa del Generalísimo: Quarterfinal
- Inter-Cities Fairs Cup: Third round
- Joan Gamper Trophy: Winner

The 1969–70 season was the 71st season for FC Barcelona.

== Squad ==
Note: Flags indicate national team as defined under FIFA eligibility rules; some limited exceptions apply. Players may hold more than one non-FIFA nationality.

No.	Pos.	Nation	Player
—	GK	ESP	Miguel Reina
—	GK	ESP	Salvador Sadurní
—	DF	ESP	Antoni Torres
—	DF	ESP	Gallego
—	DF	ESP	Eladio
—	DF	ESP	Joaquim Rifé
—	DF	ESP	Francisco Romea
—	DF	ESP	Josep Franch
—	DF	ESP	Josep Sanjuan Ibánez
—	MF	ESP	Marcial
—	MF	ESP	Pedro María Zabalza
—	MF	ESP	Santiago Castro

No.	Pos.	Nation	Player
—	MF	ESP	Josep Fusté
—	MF	ESP	Juan Carlos
—	MF	ESP	Narcís Martí Filosia
—	MF	ESP	Ramoní
—	MF	ESP	García Castany
—	FW	ESP	Carles Rexach
—	FW	ESP	José Antonio Zaldúa
—	FW	ESP	Ramón Alfonseda
—	FW	ESP	Lluís Pujol
—	FW	ESP	Carlos Pellicer Vázquez
—	FW	ESP	Miguel Ángel Bustillo

== Results ==
GAMES
02-08-69 . FRIENDLY GRANOLLERS-BARCELONA 1-2

06-08-69 . FRIENDLY BLANES-BARCELONA 2-8

08-08-69 . TROFEO CIUDAD DE PALMA BARCELONA-Hamburger SV 2-2 /4-3/ penalty

09-08-69 . FRIENDLY L'ESCALA-BARCELONA 0-9

10-08-69 . TROFEO CIUDAD DE PALMA BARCELONA-STANDARD LIEGE 1-0

15-08-69 . FRIENDLY SURIA-BARCELONA 0-7

16-08-69 . Trofeo Costa del Sol BARCELONA-RIVER PLATE 0-0 /2-1/penalty

17-08-69 . Trofeo Costa del Sol BARCELONA-CORINTHIANS 1-2

17-08-69 . FRIENDLY MALGRAT-BARCELONA 0-7

21-08-69 . FRIENDLY EUROPA-BARCELONA 0-3

23-08-69 . FRIENDLY SABADELL-BARCELONA 1-3

26-08-69 . Joan Gamper Trophy BARCELONA-SLOVAN BRATISLAVA 2-1

27-08-69 . Joan Gamper Trophy BARCELONA-ZARAGOZA 2-1

30-08-69 . Mohammed V Trophy BARCELONA-SAO PAULO 2-0

31-08-69 . Mohammed V Trophy BARCELONA-BAYERN MUNICH 2-2 /4-3/ penalty

06-09-69 . FRIENDLY BARCELONA-PALMEIRAS 1-2

11-09-69 . FRIENDLY PALAMOS-BARCELONA 1-5

14-09-69 . LIGA REAL MADRID-BARCELONA 3-3

17-09-69 . Inter-Cities Fairs Cup BARCELONA-ODENSE 4-0

21-09-69 . LIGA BARCELONA-DEPORTIVO LA CORUNA 1-0

25-09-69 . FRIENDLY FARNES-BARCELONA 1-3

28-09-69 . LIGA PONTEVEDRA-BARCELONA 0-0

01-10-69 . Inter-Cities Fairs Cup ODENSE-BARCELONA 0-2

05-10-69 . LIGA BARCELONA-ATHLETIC BILBAO 3-2

12-10-69 . LIGA REAL SOCIEDAD-BARCELONA 1-0

18-10-69 . LIGA BARCELONA-SABADELL 3-1

21-10-69 . Inter-Cities Fairs Cup VASAS GYOR-BARCELONA 2-3

26-10-69 . LIGA SEVILLA-BARCELONA 3-0

29-10-69 . FRIENDLY REUS-BARCELONA 1-2

02-11-69 . LIGA BARCELONA-ATLETICO MADRID 1-2

09-11-69 . LIGA VALENCIA-BARCELONA 0-0

11-11-69 . FRIENDLY BALAGUER-BARCELONA 0-5

12-11-69 . FRIENDLY LLORENT-BARCELONA 1-5

16-11-69 . LIGA BARCELONA-CELTA 2-1

23-11-69 . LIGA MALLORCA-BARCELONA 3-2

26-11-69 . Inter-Cities Fairs Cup BARCELONA-VASAS GYOR 2-0

30-11-69 . LIGA BARCELONA-GRANADA 1-0

07-12-69 . LIGA ZARAGOZA-BARCELONA 2-1

14-12-69 . LIGA LAS PALMAS-BARCELONA 1-0

21-12-69 . LIGA BARCELONA-ELCHE 1-1

25-12-69 . FRIENDLY BARCELONA-PARTIZAN BELGRAD 2-2

28-12-69 . LIGA BARCELONA-REAL MADRID 1-0

04-01-70 . LIGA DEPORTIVO LA CORUNA-BARCELONA 0-0

07-01-70 . FRIENDLY SANT ANDREU-BARCELONA 0-5

11-01-70 . LIGA BARCELONA-PONTEVEDRA 2-0

14-01-70 . Inter-Cities Fairs Cup BARCELONA-INTER MILAN 1-2

18-01-70 . LIGA ATHLETIC BILBAO-BARCELONA 1-1

25-01-70 . LIGA BARCELONA-REAL SOCIEDAD 2-1

28-01-70 . Inter-Cities Fairs Cup INTER MILAN-BARCELONA 1-0 suspend 33 minute fog

01-02-70 . LIGA SABADELL-BARCELONA 3-2

04-02-70 . Inter-Cities Fairs Cup INTER MILAN - BARCELONA 1-1

15-02-70 . LIGA BARCELONA-SEVILLA 1-0

01-03-70 . LIGA ATHLETIC DE MADRID-BARCELONA 1-1

08-03-70 . LIGA BARCELONA-VALENCIA 1-0

15-03-70 . LIGA CELTA DE VIGO-BARCELONA 1-2

19-03-70 . FRIENDLY SANT ANDREU-BARCELONA 0-1

19-03-70 . FRIENDLY RAPITENCA-BARCELONA 2-4

22-03-70 . LIGA BARCELONA-MALLORCA 5-1

29-03-70 . LIGA GRANADA-BARCELONA 0-0

31-03-70 . FRIENDLY CADIZ-BARCELONA 1-2

05-04-70 . LIGA BARCELONA-ZARAGOZA 4-2

12-04-70 . LIGA BARCELONA-LAS PALMAS 0-0

19-04-70 . LIGA ELCHE-BARCELONA 1-0

01-05-70 . FRIENDLY CALELLA-BARCELONA 3-3

03-05-70 . Copa del Generalísimo ESPANYOL-BARCELONA 2-1

07-05-70 . FRIENDLY FIGUERES-BARCELONA 1-4

10-05-70 . Copa del Generalísimo BARCELONA-ESPANYOL 3-1

11-05-70 . FRIENDLY LLEIDA-BARCELONA 3-0

17-05-70 . Copa del Generalísimo CELTA DE VIGO-BARCELONA 1-0

20-05-70 . FRIENDLY MATARO-BARCELONA 1-3

24-05-70 . Copa del Generalísimo BARCELONA-CELTA DE VIGO 3-0

28-05-70 . FRIENDLY BADALONA-BARCELONA 0-3

28-05-70 . FRIENDLY TORELLO-BARCELONA 0-5

30-05-70 . Copa del Generalísimo REAL MADRID-BARCELONA 2-0

06-06-70 . Copa del Generalísimo BARCELONA-REAL MADRID 1-1

24-06-70 . FRIENDLY MANRESA - BARCELONA 2-8
