= 1970–71 FC Barcelona season =

72nd season in existence of FC Barcelona

FC Barcelona
1970–71 season
- President: Agustí Montal Costa
- Manager: Vic Buckingham
- La Liga: Second
- Copa del Generalísimo: Champion
- Fairs Cup: Second round
- Joan Gamper Trophy: Third

The 1970–71 season was the 72nd season for FC Barcelona.

The team finished second in La Liga, though they were tied with champions Valencia CF on points. They won the Copa del Generalísimo.

== Squad ==
Note: Flags indicate national team as defined under FIFA eligibility rules; some limited exceptions apply. Players may hold more than one non-FIFA nationality.

No.	Pos.	Nation	Player
—	GK	ESP	Miguel Reina
—	GK	ESP	Salvador Sadurní
—	DF	ESP	Antoni Torres
—	DF	ESP	Joaquim Rifé
—	DF	ESP	Gallego
—	DF	ESP	Eladio
—	DF	ESP	Bartolomé Paredes
—	MF	ESP	Juan Manuel Asensi
—	MF	ESP	Narcís Martí Filosia
—	MF	ESP	Marcial

No.	Pos.	Nation	Player
—	MF	ESP	Pedro María Zabalza
—	MF	ESP	Juan Carlos
—	MF	ESP	Josep Fusté
—	MF	ESP	José Luis Romero
—	MF	ESP	José Pablo García Castany
—	FW	ESP	Lluís Pujol
—	FW	ESP	Carles Rexach
—	FW	ESP	Ramón Alfonseda
—	FW	ESP	Teófilo Dueñas
—	FW	ESP	Miguel Ángel Bustillo

== La Liga ==
=== League table ===
Pos	Team	Pld	W	D	L	GF	GA	GD	Pts	Qualification or relegation
1	Valencia (C)	30	18	7	5	41	19	+22	43	Qualification for the European Cup first round
2	Barcelona	30	19	5	6	50	22	+28	43	Qualification for the Cup Winners' Cup first round (Note: Barcelona qualified to the Cup Winners' Cup as champions of the Copa del Generalísimo.)
3	Atlético Madrid	30	17	8	5	51	20	+31	42	Qualification for the UEFA Cup first round
4	Real Madrid	30	17	7	6	46	24	+22	41	Qualification for the UEFA Cup first round
5	Atlético Bilbao	30	14	7	9	40	31	+9	35	Qualification for the UEFA Cup first round

Source: BDFútbol
Rules for classification: 1) Points; 2) Head-to-head results; 3) Goal difference; 4) Number of goals scored
(C) Champions

== Results ==
GAMES
14-08-70 . FRIENDLY GIRONA-BARCELONA 1-3

15-08-70 . FRIENDLY AMPOSTA-BARCELONA 1-6

18-08-70 . FRIENDLY GRANOLLERS-BARCELONA 1-1

22-08-70 . Festa d'Elx Trophy ELCHE-BARCELONA 0-1

25-08-70 . Joan Gamper Trophy BARCELONA-DYNAMO MOSCOW 0-5

26-08-70 . Joan Gamper Trophy BARCELONA-SCHALKE 1-0

29-08-70 . FRIENDLY RACING SANTANDER-BARCELONA 1-2

30-08-70 . FRIENDLY MASNOU-BARCELONA 1-4

03-09-70 . FRIENDLY RAYO VALLECANO-BARCELONA 1-1

06-09-70 . FRIENDLY SABADELL -BARCELONA 0-0

08-09-70 . FRIENDLY ANGLES-BARCELONA 0-7

12-09-70 . LIGA ATHLETIC BILBAO-BARCELONA 1-1

16-09-70 . Fairs Cup KATOWICE-BARCELONA 0-1

20-09-70 . LIGA BARCELONA-ZARAGOZA 5-2

25-09-70 . Fairs Cup BARCELONA-KATOWICE 3-2

27-09-70 . LIGA CELTA VIGO-BARCELONA 1-1

30-09-70 . FRIENDLY TARRAGONA-BARCELONA 2-0

04-10-70 . LIGA BARCELONA-SABADELL 4-1

11-10-70 . LIGA ELCHE-BARCELONA 0-1

17-10-70 . LIGA BARCELONA-ESPANYOL 3-0

20-10-70 . Fairs Cup BARCELONA-JUVENTUS 1-2

25-10-70 . LIGA REAL MADRID-BARCELONA 0-1

31-10-70 . LIGA BARCELONA-VALENCIA 0-2

04-11-70 . Fairs Cup JUVENTUS-BARCELONA 2-1

15-11-70 . LIGA SEVILLA-BARCELONA 0-1

22-11-70 . LIGA BARCELONA-GRANADA 2-1

26-11-70 . FRIENDLY TORTOSA-BARCELONA 2-2

29-11-70 . LIGA REAL SOCIEDAD-BARCELONA 1-0

06-12-70 . LIGA BARCELONA-SPORTING GIJON 2-0

08-12-70 . FRIENDLY BARCELONA-FEYENOORD 3-2

13-12-70 . LIGA MALAGA-BARCELONA 0-1

16-12-70 . FRIENDLY ANDORRA-BARCELONA 0-2

20-12-70 . LIGA LAS PALMAS-BARCELONA 3-2

25-12-70 . FRIENDLY BARCELONA-C.S.K.A. SOFIA 1-4

27-12-70 . LIGA BARCELONA-ATLETICO MADRID 2-0

03-01-71 . LIGA BARCELONA-ATHLETIC BILBAO 0-1

10-01-71 . LIGA ZARAGOZA-BARCELONA 1-2

17-01-71 . LIGA BARCELONA-CELTA 2-1

24-01-71 . LIGA SABADELL-BARCELONA 2-1

31-01-71 . LIGA BARCELONA-ELCHE 0-0

07-02-71 . LIGA ESPANYOL-BARCELONA 0-1

14-02-71 . LIGA BARCELONA-REAL MADRID 0-1

28-02-71 . LIGA VALENCIA-BARCELONA 1-1

07-03-71 . LIGA BARCELONA-SEVILLA 5-2

14-03-71 . LIGA GRANADA-BARCELONA 0-2

18-03-71 . FRIENDLY CASTELLON-BARCELONA 1-2

21-03-71 . LIGA BARCELONA-REAL SOCIEDAD 4-0

28-03-71 . LIGA SPORTING GIJON-BARCELONA 0-2

04-04-71 . LIGA BARCELONA-MALAGA 1-0

12-04-71 . LIGA BARCELONA-LAS PALMAS 2-0

15-04-71 . FRIENDLY MANRESA-BARCELONA 1-4

18-04-71 . LIGA ATLETICO MADRID-BARCELONA 1-1

24-04-71 . COPA GENERALISIMO VILLARREAL-BARCELONA 1-0

02-05-71 . COPA GENERALISIMO BARCELONA-VILLARREAL 2-0

06-05-71 . FRIENDLY FIGUERES-BARCELONA 0-1

14-05-71 . FRIENDLY TARRAGONA-BARCELONA 2-0

16-05-71 . COPA GENERALISIMO ATHLETIC BILBAO-BARCELONA 1-0

20-05-71 . FRIENDLY TERRASSA-BARCELONA 0-1

23-05-71 . COPA GENERALISIMO BARCELONA-ATHLETIC BILBAO 3-0

31-05-71 . FRIENDLY TORELLO-BARCELONA 1-4

31-05-71 . FRIENDLY PUIGREIG-BARCELONA 1-5

05-06-71 . FRIENDLY BARCELONA-STANDARD LIEGE 2-1

09-06-71 . COPA GENERALISIMO BARCELONA-DEPORTIVO LA CORUNA 4-0

10-06-71 . FRIENDLY CORNELLA-BARCELONA 0-1

13-06-71 . COPA GENERALISIMO DEPORTIVO LA CORUNA-BARCELONA 0-0

20-06-71 . COPA GENERALISIMO ATLETICO MADRID-BARCELONA 0-1

24-06-71 . FRIENDLY SANT HILARI-BARCELONA 0-5

26-06-71 . COPA GENERALISIMO BARCELONA-ATLETICO MADRID 1-1

26-06-71 . FRIENDLY VINAROS-BARCELONA 2-2

29-06-71 . FRIENDLY GAVA-BARCELONA 2-3

04-07-71 . COPA GENERALISIMO FINAL VALENCIA-BARCELONA 3-4
