= 1971–72 FC Barcelona season =

73rd season in existence of FC Barcelona

FC Barcelona
1971–72 season
- President: Agustí Montal Costa
- Manager: Rinus Michels
- La Liga: Third
- Copa del Generalísimo: Quarterfinal
- Cup Win.Cup: Second round
- Fairs Cup super Final: Winner
- Joan Gamper Trophy: Winner

The 1971–72 season was the 73rd season for FC Barcelona.

== Squad ==
Note: Flags indicate national team as defined under FIFA eligibility rules; some limited exceptions apply. Players may hold more than one non-FIFA nationality.

No.	Pos.	Nation	Player
—	GK	ESP	Miguel Reina
—	GK	ESP	Salvador Sadurní
—	DF	ESP	Antoni Torres
—	DF	ESP	Gallego
—	DF	ESP	Joaquim Rifé
—	DF	ESP	Quique Costas
—	DF	ESP	Eladio
—	DF	ESP	Bartolomé Paredes
—	MF	ESP	Juan Manuel Asensi
—	MF	ESP	Narcís Martí Filosia
—	MF	ESP	Marcial

No.	Pos.	Nation	Player
—	MF	ESP	Pedro María Zabalza
—	MF	ESP	Juan Carlos
—	MF	ESP	Josep Fusté
—	FW	ESP	Lluís Pujol
—	FW	ESP	Carles Rexach
—	FW	ESP	José María Pérez Boixaderas
—	FW	ESP	Ramón Alfonseda
—	FW	ESP	Teófilo Dueñas
—	FW	ESP	Juanito
—	FW	ESP	Miguel Ángel Bustillo

== La Liga ==
=== League table ===
Pos	Team	Pld	W	D	L	GF	GA	GD	Pts	Qualification or relegation
1	Real Madrid (C)	34	19	9	6	51	27	+24	47	Qualification for the European Cup first round
2	Valencia	34	19	7	8	53	30	+23	45	Qualification for the UEFA Cup first round
3	Barcelona	34	17	9	8	40	26	+14	43	Qualification for the UEFA Cup first round
4	Atlético Madrid	34	14	11	9	45	28	+17	39	Qualification for the Cup Winners' Cup first round (Note: Atlético Madrid qualified to the Cup Winners' Cup as champions of the Copa del Generalísimo.)
5	Las Palmas	34	15	8	11	40	36	+4	38	Qualification for the UEFA Cup first round

Source: BDFútbol
Rules for classification: 1) Points; 2) Head-to-head results; 3) Goal difference; 4) Number of goals scored
(C) Champions

== Results ==
GAMES
13-08-71 . TORNEO CIUDAD DE PALMA BARCELONA-MALLORCA 4-1

15-08-71 . TORNEO CIUDAD DE PALMA BARCELONA-CSKA SOFIA 1-2

17-08-71 . FRIENDLY CARDEDEU-BARCELONA 3-10

21-08-71 . FRIENDLY GRANOLLERS-BARCELONA 0-2

21-08-71 . FRIENDLY BLANES-BARCELONA 2-5

24-08-71 . Joan Gamper Trophy BARCELONA-HONVED 1-1 /8-4/ PENALTY

25-08-71 . Joan Gamper Trophy BARCELONA-CHACARITAS JUNIORS 1-0

29-08-71 . FRIENDLY ZARAGOZA-BARCELONA 0-1

05-09-71 . LIGA BARCELONA-REAL SOCIEDAD 3-0

12-09-71 . LIGA ESPANYOL-BARCELONA 3-0

15-09-71 . Cup Win.Cup DESTILLERY-BARCELONA 1-3

19-09-71 . LIGA BARCELONA-LAS PALMAS 1-2

22-09-71 . FAIRS CUP SUPER FINAL BARCELONA-LEEDS UNITED 2-1

26-09-71 . LIGA SPORTING GIJON-BARCELONA 1-0

29-09-71 . Cup Win.Cup BARCELONA-DESTILLERY 4-0

03-10-71 . LIGA BARCELONA-ATLETICO MADRID 0-0

10-10-71 . LIGA BETIS-BARCELONA 0-0

16-10-71 . LIGA BARCELONA-CELTA DE VIGO 1-0

20-10-71 . Cup Win.Cup BARCELONA-STEAUA 0-1

31-10-71 . LIGA SABADELL-BARCELONA 0-0

03-11-71 . Cup Win.Cup STEAUA-BARCELONA 2-1

07-11-71 . FRIENDLY COMBINED CATALA-BARCELONA 1-3

14-11-71 . LIGA BARCELONA-ATHLETIC BILBAO 0-1

21-11-71 . LIGA VALENCIA-BARCELONA 1-0

28-11-71 . LIGA REAL MADRID-BARCELONA 1-1

05-12-71 . LIGA BARCELONA-GRANADA 2-0

08-12-71 . FRIENDLY BARCELONA-VASAS BUDAPEST 0-1

12-12-71 . LIGA DEPORTIVO LA CORUNA-BARCELONA 0-2

19-12-71 . LIGA BARCELONA-SEVILLA 1-0

02-01-72 . LIGA BURGOS-BARCELONA 2-3

06-01-72 . LIGA BARCELONA-CORDOBA 4-1

16-01-72 . LIGA MALAGA-BARCELONA 0-0

23-01-72 . LIGA REAL SOCIEDAD-BARCELONA 2-2

27-01-72 . FRIENDLY MATARO-BARCELONA 0-5

30-01-72 . LIGA BARCELONA-ESPANYOL 2-0

02-02-72 . FRIENDLY TARRAGONA-BARCELONA 0-1

06-02-72 . LIGA LAS PALMAS-BARCELONA 1-2

08-02-72 . FRIENDLY TENERIFE-BARCELONA 4-0

13-02-72 . LIGA BARCELONA-SPORTING GIJON 1-0

20-02-72 . LIGA ATLETICO MADRID-BARCELONA 1-1

27-02-72 . LIGA BARCELONA-BETIS 2-2

05-03-72 . LIGA CELTA DE VIGO-BARCELONA 1-2

12-03-72 . LIGA BARCELONA-SABADELL 2-0

19-03-72 . LIGA ATHLETIC BILBAO-BARCELONA 0-1

26-03-72 . LIGA BARCELONA-VALENCIA 1-1

03-04-72 . LIGA BARCELONA-REAL MADRID 1-0

09-04-72 . LIGA GRANADA-BARCELONA 2-0

13-04-72 . FRIENDLY SANT ANDREU-BARCELONA 3-1

16-04-72 . LIGA BARCELONA-DEPORTIVO LA CORUNA 1-0

22-04-72 . LIGA SEVILLA-BARCELONA 1-2

30-04-72 . LIGA BARCELONA-BURGOS 2-1

04-05-72 . FRIENDLY FIGUERES-BARCELONA 0-0 /2-3/ penals

07-05-72 . LIGA CORDOBA-BARCELONA 1-0

14-05-72 . LIGA BARCELONA-MALAGA 0-1

21-05-72 . FRIENDLY GAVÁ-BARCELONA, 0-8

28-05-72 . Teresa Herrera Trophy BARCELONA-A.D.O. DEN HAAG 2-0

01-06-72 . FRIENDLY CALELLA-BARCELONA 1-5

04-06-72 . COPA GENERALISIMO CASTELLON-BARCELONA 0-0

10-06-72 . COPA GENERALISIMO BARCELONA-CASTELLON 2-1

17-06-72 . COPA GENERALISIMO BARCELONA-ATLETICO MADRID 0-2

21-06-72 . FRIENDLY BANYOLES-BARCELONA 0-8

24-06-72 . COPA GENERALISIMO ATLETICO MADRID-BARCELONA 1-0
