= 1968 Copa del Generalísimo final =

Copa del Generalísimo 1968 final
- Event: 1967–68 Copa del Generalísimo
Barcelona	Real Madrid
1	0
- Date: 11 July 1968
- Venue: Santiago Bernabéu, Madrid
- Referee: Antonio Rigo
- Attendance: 100,000

The Copa del Generalísimo 1968 final was the 66th final of the King's Cup. The final was played on 11 July 1968 at the Santiago Bernabéu Stadium in Madrid, and was won by Barcelona, who beat Real Madrid 1–0.

== Match details ==
11 July 1968
21:00 CET

Barcelona	1–0	Real Madrid
Zunzunegui 6' (o.g.)	Report (in Spanish)

Santiago Bernabeu, Madrid
Attendance: 100,000
Referee: Antonio Rigo

Barcelona

Real Madrid

GK	1	(Spain) Salvador Sadurní
DF	2	(Spain) Antonio Torres
DF	3	(Spain) Gallego
DF	4	(Spain) Eladio
MF	5	(Spain) Pedro María Zabalza
MF	6	(Spain) José María Fusté
FW	7	(Spain) Joaquín Rifé
FW	8	(Spain) José Antonio Zaldúa (c)
FW	9	(Portugal) Jorge Mendonça
FW	10	(Spain) Jesús Pereda
FW	11	(Spain) Carlos Rexach
Manager:
(Spain) Salvador Artigas

GK	1	(Spain) Antonio Betancort
DF	2	(Spain) Vicente Miera (c)
DF	3	(Spain) Fernando Zunzunegui
DF	4	(Spain) Manuel Sanchís
MF	5	(Spain) Pirri
MF	6	(Spain) Ignacio Zoco
FW	7	(Spain) Fernando Serena
FW	8	(Spain) José Luis
FW	9	(Spain) Amancio
FW	10	(Spain) Ramón Grosso
FW	11	(Argentina) Miguel Pérez
Manager:
(Spain) Miguel Muñoz

== See also ==
- El Clásico
