= 1968–69 FC Barcelona season =

70th season in existence of FC Barcelona

FC Barcelona
1968–69 season
- President: Narcís de Carreras
- Manager: Salvador Artigas
- La Liga: Third
- Copa del Generalísimo: Round of 16
- Cup Win.Cup: Runner-up
- Joan Gamper Trophy: Winner
Home colours	Away colours

The 1968–69 season was the 70th season for FC Barcelona.

== Results ==
Date	Competition	Opposition	H/A	Score
17 August 1968	FRIENDLY	GRANOLLERS	A	4–1
21 August 1968	Joan Gamper Trophy	WERDER BREMEN	H	3–0
22 August 1969	Joan Gamper Trophy	FLAMENGO	H	5–4
25 August 1968	FRIENDLY	SABADELL	A	2–2
29 August 1968	FRIENDLY	PALAMOS	A	3–1
31 August 1968	Ramón de Carranza Trophy	REAL MADRID	H	2–1
1 September 1968	Ramón de Carranza Trophy	ATLETICO MADRID	A	0–1
1 September 1968	FRIENDLY	LLEIDA	A	1–0
3 September 1968	FRIENDLY	TERRASSA	A	4–1
5 September 1968	FRIENDLY	BLANES	A	5–1
8 September 1968	TROFEO CONCEPCIÓN ARENAL	ZARAGOZA	H	2–0
8 September 1968	FRIENDLY	LYON	H	7–1
14 September 1968	LIGA	REAL SOCIEDAD	H	0–0
15 September 1968	FRIENDLY	TORELLO	A	7–0
18 September 1968	Cup Win.Cup	LUGANO	A	1–0
21 September 1968	LIGA ATLETICO	MADRID	A	1–0
23 September 1968	FRIENDLY	EUROPA	A	4–1
25 September 1968	FRIENDLY	FARNERS	A	4–1
29 September 1968	LIGA LAS	PALMAS	A	0–0
2 October 1968	Cup Win.Cup	LUGANO	H	3–0
6 October 1968	LIGA	PONTEVEDRA	H	1–0
13 October 1968	LIGA	GRANADA	A	0–1
15 October 1968	FRIENDLY	VENDRELL	A	5–2
20 October 1968	LIGA	ZARAGOZA	H	4–0
23 October 1968	FRIENDLY	Hamburger SV	H	2–3
25 October 1968	FRIENDLY	BANYOLES	A	5–1
27 October 1968	FRIENDLY	GIRONA	A	3–2
3 November 1968	LIGA	ELCHE	A	2–1
10 November 1968	LIGA	MALAGA	H	1–0
12 November 1968	FRIENDLY	CALELLA	H	2–0
16 November 1968	LIGA REAL	MADRID	A	1–2
24 November 1968	LIGA	ESPANYOL	H	1–0
1 December 1968	LIGA DEPORTIVO LA	CORUNA	A	0–1
15 December 1968	LIGA ATHLETIC	BILBAO	A	1–1
18 December 1968	LIGA	CORDOBA	H	4–0
22 December 1968	LIGA	SABADELL	H	2–0
25 December 1968	FRIENDLY	SPARTA PRAGA	H	3–1
29 December 1968	LIGA	VALENCIA	A	0–0
5 January 1969	LIGA REAL	SOCIEDAD	A	1–2
12 January 1969	LIGA	ATLETICO MADRID	H	4–1
19 January 1969	LIGA	LAS PALMAS	H	1–2
21 January 1969	FRIENDLY	VILANOVA	A	2–1
26 January 1969	LIGA	PONTEVEDRA	A	1–0
30 January 1969	Cup Win.Cup	LYN	A	3–2
2 February 1969	LIGA	GRANADA	H	4–0
5 February 1969	Cup Win.Cup	LYN	H	2–2
9 February 1969	LIGA	ZARAGOZA	A	0–0
16 February 1969	LIGA	ELCHE	H	1–1
23 February 1969	FRIENDLY	GIRONA	A	1–1
2 March 1969	LIGA	MALAGA	A	3–0
9 March 1969	LIGA	REAL MADRID	H	1–1
16 March 1969	LIGA	ESPANYOL	A	0–0
19 March 1969	BODAS ORO UD FIGUERES	FIGUERES	A	8–0
23 March 1969	LIGA	DEPORTIVO LA CORUNA	H	4–1
26 March 1969	FRIENDLY SELECT	ESSEN	A	0–1
30 March 1969	LIGA	CORDOBA	A	1–2
2 April 1969	Cup Win.Cup	KOLN	A	2–2
7 April 1969	LIGA	ATHLETIC BILBAO	H	0–1
13 April 1969	LIGA	SABADELL	A	0–0
16 April 1969	LIGA	VALENCIA	H	1–1
19 April 1969	Cup Win.Cup	KOLN	H	4–1
1 May 1969	FRIENDLY	CALELLA	A	2–2
4 May 1969	COPA GENERALISIMO REAL	SOCIEDAD	A	1–5
10 May 1969	COPA GENERALISIMO	REAL SOCIEDAD	H	3–0
15 May 1969	FRIENDLY	STOKE CITY	H	2–3
21 May 1969	Cup Win.Cup Final	SLOVAN BRATISLAVA	A	2–3
25 May 1969	FRIENDLY	FIORENTINA	A	2–0
30 May 1969	NEW YORK TOURNAMENT	JUVENTUS	H	3–2
4 June 1969	NEW YORK TOURNAMENT	JUVENTUS	H	1–0
5 June 1969	FRIENDLY	MATARO	A	5–1
8 June 1969	NEW YORK TOURNAMENT	ALL STAR	A	3–0
12 June 1969	COPA PRESIDENTE	EUROPA	H	1–0
15 June 1969	COPA PRESIDENTE	CALELLA	H	1–3
18 June 1969	COPA PRESIDENTE	GIMNASTIC	H	1–3
21 June 1969	COPA PRESIDENTE	EUROPA	H	3–0
24 June 1969	COPA PRESIDENTE	CALELLA	H	3–2
29 June 1969	COPA PRESIDENTE	GIMNASTIC	H	0–1
