= 1962–63 FC Barcelona season =

64th season in existence of FC Barcelona

FC Barcelona
1962–63 season
- President: Enric Llaudet
- Manager: Ladislao Kubala (until 9 January 1963); Josep Gonzalvo
- La Liga: Sixth
- Copa del Generalísimo: Champion
- Inter-Cities Fairs Cup: Second round

The 1962–63 season was the 64th season for FC Barcelona.

== Results ==
GAMES
25-08-62 . FRIENDLY BARCELONA-AEK Athens 6-1

01-09-62 . Ramón de Carranza Trophy BARCELONA-SAN LORENZO 3-2

02-09-62 . Ramón de Carranza Trophy BARCELONA-ZARAGOZA 1-1 /8-3/ PENALTY

08-09-62 . FAIRS CUP FINAL VALENCIA-BARCELONA 6-2

09-09-62 . FRIENDLY LLEIDA-BARCELONA 2-3

12-09-62 . FAIRS CUP FINAL BARCELONA-VALENCIA 1-1

16-09-62 . LIGA ATHLETIC BILBAO-BARCELONA 2-3

23-09-62 . LIGA BARCELONA-BETIS 1-0

30-09-62 . LIGA REAL MADRID-BARCELONA 2-0

03-10-62 . Inter-Cities Fairs Cup BELENENSES-BARCELONA 1-1

07-10-62 . LIGA BARCELONA-DEPORTIVO LA CORUNA 5-2

11-10-62 . Inter-Cities Fairs Cup BARCELONA-BELENENSES 1-1

14-10-62 . LIGA BARCELONA-MALAGA 4-0

21-10-62 . LIGA ELCHE-BARCELONA 1-1

24-10-62 . FRIENDLY BARCELONA-MANTOVA 1-0

28-10-62 . LIGA BARCELONA-VALLADOLID 2-1

31-10-62 . Inter-Cities Fairs Cup BARCELONA-BELENENSES 3-2 PLAY-OFF

01-11-62 . FRIENDLY MARTINENC-BARCELONA 1-3

04-11-62 . LIGA OVIEDO-BARCELONA 3-1

11-11-62 . LIGA BARCELONA-VALENCIA 1-1

18-11-62 . LIGA SEVILLA-BARCELONA 1-0

21-11-62 . FRIENDLY HIBERNIAN-BARCELONA 1-3

25-11-62 . FRIENDLY SELECT BERLIN-BARCELONA 1-2

29-11-62 . FRIENDLY RACING PARIS-BARCELONA 1-2

02-12-62 . Inter-Cities Fairs Cup RED STAR BELGRADE-BARCELONA 3-2

09-12-62 . LIGA BARCELONA-ATLETICO MADRID 0-0

16-12-62 . LIGA ZARAGOZA-BARCELONA 2-1

19-12-62 . Inter-Cities Fairs Cup BARCELONA-RED STAR BELGRADE 1-0

23-12-62 . LIGA BARCELONA-CORDOBA 2-1

30-12-62 . LIGA OSASUNA-BARCELONA 3-1

02-01-63 . Inter-Cities Fairs Cup RED STAR BELGRADE-BARCELONA 1-0 PLAY-OFF

06-01-63 . LIGA BARCELONA-MALLORCA 1-1

13-01-63 . LIGA BARCELONA-ATHLETIC BILBAO 0-0

20-01-63 . LIGA BETIS-BARCELONA 1-1

27-01-63 . LIGA BARCELONA-REAL MADRID 1-5

03-02-63 . LIGA DEPORTIVO LA CORUNA-BARCELONA 1-0

10-02-63 . LIGA MALAGA-BARCELONA 0-7

17-02-63 . LIGA BARCELONA-ELCHE 4-0

24-02-63 . LIGA VALLADOLID-BARCELONA 1-0

03-03-63 . LIGA BARCELONA-OVIEDO 2-1

10-03-63 . LIGA VALENCIA-BARCELONA 0-3

17-03-63 . LIGA BARCELONA-SEVILLA 0-0

19-03-63 . FRIENDLY SABADELL-BARCELONA 2-1

24-03-63 . LIGA ATHLETIC DE MADRID-BARCELONA 4-2

31-03-63 . LIGA BARCELONA-ZARAGOZA 0-0

07-04-63 . LIGA CORDOBA-BARCELONA 1-2

14-04-63 . LIGA BARCELONA-OSASUNA 0-0

15-04-63 . FRIENDLY MATARO-BARCELONA 2-5

21-04-63 . FRIENDLY SANT ANDREU-BARCELONA 4-9

21-04-63 . LIGA MALLORCA-BARCELONA 2-0

28-04-63 . COPA GENERALISIMO BARCELONA-MURCIA 3-1

01-05-63 . FRIENDLY HANNOVER-BARCELONA 2-4

05-05-63 . FRIENDLY WALDHOF-BARCELONA 0-2

05-05-63 . COPA GENERALISIMO MURCIA-BARCELONA 1-0

12-05-63 . COPA GENERALISIMO ELCHE-BARCELONA 4-1

19-05-63 . COPA GENERALISIMO BARCELONA-ELCHE 4-1

21-05-63 . COPA GENERALISIMO BARCELONA-ELCHE 2-1

26-05-63 . COPA GENERALISIMO VALLADOLID-BARCELONA 2-1

01-06-63 . COPA GENERALISIMO BARCELONA-VALLADOLID 4-1

03-06-63 . FRIENDLY PUIGREIG-BARCELON 1-4

09-06-63 . COPA GENERALISIMO VALENCIA-BARCELONA 2-2

12-06-63 . FRIENDLY BARCELONA-SANTOS 2-0

15-06-63 . COPA GENERALISIMO BARCELONA-VALENCIA 1-1

18-06-63 . COPA GENERALISIMO BARCELONA-VALENCIA 1-0

23-06-63 . COPA GENERALISIMO FINAL BARCELONA-ZARAGOZA 3-1

28-06-63 . FRIENDLY BARCELONA-STANDARD LIEGE 4-2

04-07-63 . Triangular Tournament SELECT AFA BUENOS AIRES-BARCELONA 0-3

06-07-63 . Triangular Tournament NACIONAL MONTEVIDEO-BARCELONA 2-2

09-07-63 . Triangular Tournament BOCA JUNIORS-BARCELONA 2-1
