= 2017 Copa del Rey final =

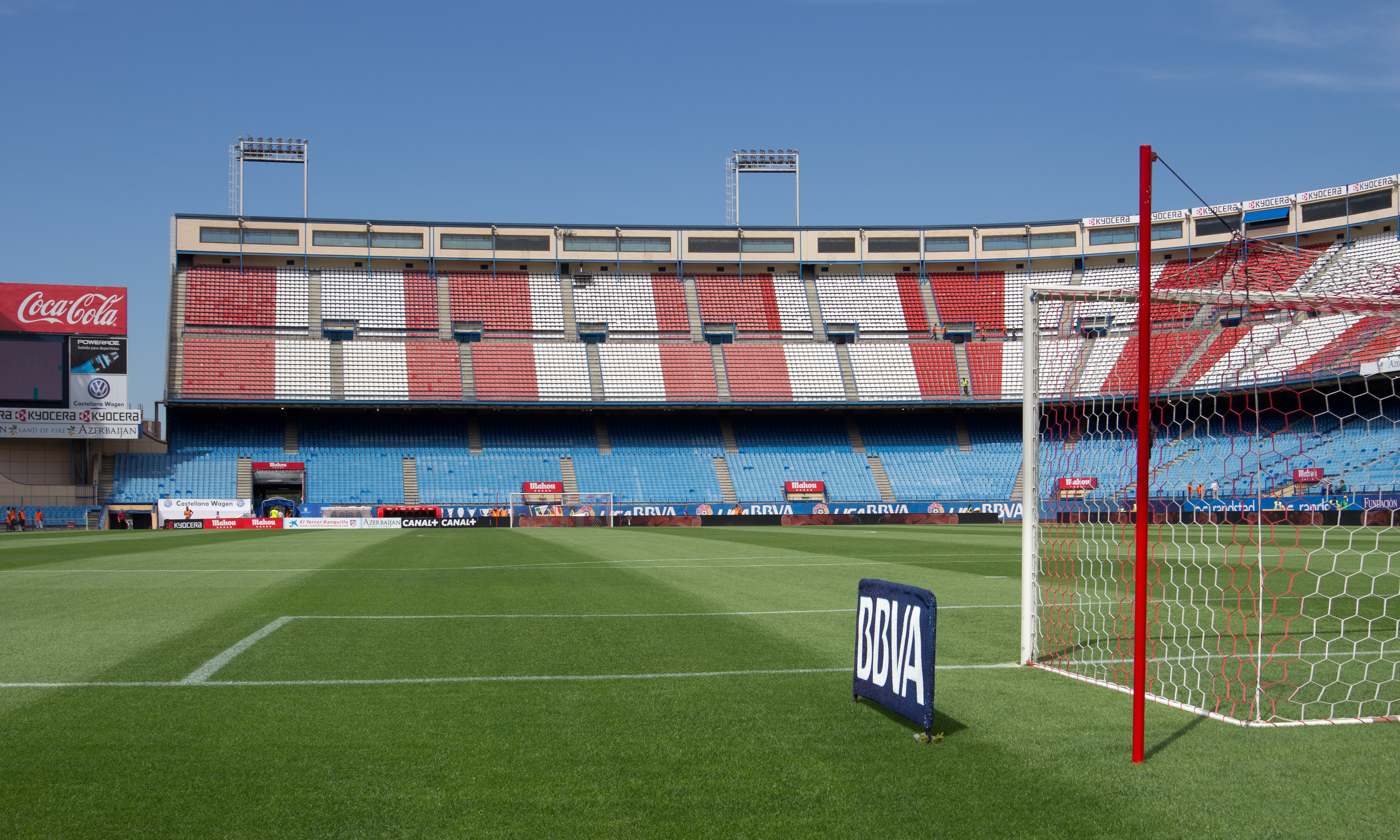
- Vicente Calderón Stadium in Madrid hosted the final
- Event: 2016–17 Copa del Rey
Barcelona	Alavés
3	1
- Date: 27 May 2017
- Venue: Vicente Calderón, Madrid
- Man of the Match: Lionel Messi (Barcelona)
- Referee: Carlos Clos Gómez
- Attendance: 45,000

The 2017 Copa del Rey final was a football match played on 27 May 2017 to decide the winner of the 2016–17 Copa del Rey, the 115th edition of Spain's primary football cup (including two seasons where two rival editions were played). The match was between Barcelona and Alavés at the Vicente Calderón in Madrid.

As winners, Barcelona faced Real Madrid in the 2017 Supercopa de España, and qualified for the 2017–18 UEFA Europa League group stage. However, as they had already qualified for the Champions League through their league position, the Europa League spot was thus passed down the league to sixth-placed side Real Sociedad.

== Background ==
Barcelona had previously played in 39 Copa del Rey finals, tied only with Real Madrid's 39, and had a record 28 victories. They were the reigning champions, having defeated Sevilla 2–0 after extra time in the previous year's final at the Vicente Calderón in Madrid. This was their fourth consecutive final, and they were seeking a third consecutive title, a feat previously accomplished by themselves in 1953, and Athletic Bilbao in 1916 and 1945; Real Madrid (1908) and Athletic (1933) held the shared record of winning four consecutive finals.

Meanwhile, Alavés, in their first back in the top flight following promotion to La Liga, were competing in their first ever Copa del Rey final, and their first major final since their 5–4 defeat to Liverpool in the 2001 UEFA Cup Final.

Sergi Roberto and Luis Suárez were suspended and did not play in the final for Barcelona, as they were both sent off in the semi-final second leg match against Atlético Madrid.

== Route to the final ==
Barcelona			Round	Alavés
Opponent	Result	Legs		Opponent	Result	Legs
Hércules	8–1	1–1 away; 7–0 home	Round of 32	Gimnàstic	6–0	3–0 away; 3–0 home
Athletic Bilbao	4–3	1–2 away; 3–1 home	Round of 16	Deportivo La Coruña	3–3 (a)	2–2 away; 1–1 home
Real Sociedad	6–2	1–0 away; 5–2 home	Quarter-finals	Alcorcón	2–0	2–0 away; 0–0 home
Atlético Madrid	3–2	2–1 away; 1–1 home	Semi-finals	Celta Vigo	1–0	0–0 away; 1–0 home

== Match ==
=== Summary ===
Lionel Messi opened the scoring in the 30th minute when he shot left footed from just outside the penalty area to the left corner of the net. It was 1–1 three minutes later when Théo Hernandez scored with a long range free-kick to the left corner of the net from the right of the penalty area. Neymar put Barcelona back in front in the final minute of the first half with a close range finish after a low cross from André Gomes on the right. Paco Alcácer then made it 3–1 in the third minute of time added on in the first half with a right foot finish from six yards out after Messi had made a run into the penalty area, passing three Alavés defenders and flicking the ball to him. There was no further scoring in the second half. Messi was named man of the match with one goal scored, one assisted and another one created.

Neymar equalised Ferenc Puskás's record for having scored in three consecutive Copa del Rey finals and now is only one behind Telmo Zarra, who scored in four successive finals. Lionel Messi became only the second player in Copa del Rey history to score in four different finals, after Zarra who scored in five in total.

=== Details ===
27 May 2017
21:30 CEST

Barcelona	3–1	Alavés
Messi 30'; Neymar 45'; Alcácer 45+3'	Report	Hernandez 33'

Vicente Calderón, Madrid
Attendance: 45,000
Referee: Carlos Clos Gómez

Barcelona	Alavés

GK	13	(Netherlands) Jasper Cillessen
RB	14	(Argentina) Javier Mascherano		(substituted off) 11'
CB	3	(Spain) Gerard Piqué
CB	23	(France) Samuel Umtiti	(yellow card) 42'
LB	18	(Spain) Jordi Alba
DM	5	(Spain) Sergio Busquets
CM	4	(Croatia) Ivan Rakitić		(substituted off) 83'
CM	8	(Spain) Andrés Iniesta (c)	(yellow card) 76'
RW	10	(Argentina) Lionel Messi	(yellow card) 76'
LW	11	(Brazil) Neymar
CF	17	(Spain) Paco Alcácer
Substitutes:
GK	1	(Germany) Marc-André ter Stegen
DF	19	(France) Lucas Digne
DF	22	(Spain) Aleix Vidal		(substituted on) 83'
DF	33	(Brazil) Marlon Santos
MF	6	(Spain) Denis Suárez
MF	21	(Portugal) André Gomes		(substituted on) 11'
FW	7	(Turkey) Arda Turan
Manager:
(Spain) Luis Enrique

GK	1	(Spain) Fernando Pacheco
CB	22	(Spain) Carlos Vigaray
CB	2	(Brazil) Rodrigo Ely	(yellow card) 49'
CB	24	(Morocco) Zouhair Feddal
RWB	21	(Spain) Kiko Femenía
LWB	15	(France) Théo Hernandez		(substituted off) 79'
RM	17	(Spain) Édgar Méndez	(yellow card) 16'	(substituted off) 59'
CM	6	(Spain) Marcos Llorente
CM	19	(Spain) Manu García (c)	(yellow card) 39'
LM	11	(Spain) Ibai Gómez		(substituted off) 60'
CF	20	(Brazil) Deyverson	(yellow card) 88'
Substitutes:
GK	13	(Spain) Adrián Ortolá
DF	4	(Spain) Alexis
MF	8	(Spain) Víctor Camarasa		(substituted on) 59'
MF	10	(Paraguay) Óscar Romero		(substituted on) 79'
MF	16	(Colombia) Daniel Torres
FW	7	(Spain) Rubén Sobrino	(yellow card) 76'	(substituted on) 60'
FW	18	(Spain) Gaizka Toquero
Manager:
(Argentina) Mauricio Pellegrino

Match rules

- 90 minutes
- 30 minutes of extra time if necessary
- Penalty shoot-out if score is still level
- Seven named substitutes, of which up to three may be used
