= Teófilo Dueñas =

Spanish footballer (born 1946)

Personal information
- Full name: Teófilo Dueñas Samper
- Date of birth: 11 August 1946 (age 80)
- Place of birth: Puertollano, Spain
- Height: 1.76 m (5 ft 9 in)
- Position: Forward

Senior career*
Years	Team	Apps	(Gls)
1966	Calvo Sotelo	6	(0)
1969–1970	Rayo Vallecano	30	(14)
1970–1972	Barcelona	30	(10)
1972–1977	Granada	98	(16)
1977–1979	Palencia	49	(9)
Total		213	(50)
- * Club domestic league appearances and goals

Teófilo Dueñas Samper (born 11 August 1946) is a Spanish former footballer who played as a forward.

He achieved totals of 110 La Liga games and 25 goals for Barcelona and Granada, winning the Copa del Generalísimo and the Inter-Cities Fairs Cup Trophy play-off with the former in 1971. He also played 54 games and scored 16 goals in Segunda División for Calvo Sotelo, Rayo Vallecano and Granada.

== Career ==
=== Early career ===
Born in Puertollano in Castilla–La Mancha, Dueñas's older brother Eliseo had played for Calvo Sotelo and Conquense before committing to a career in medicine. Dueñas took part in 1963 in the first National Games of the Spanish Youth Organisation, finishing runner-up in triple jump (11.95 m) and fifth-place in high jump.

Dueñas made his senior debut for Calvo Sotelo in the Segunda División in October 1966. After playing six games, he was sent to Madrid by his parents to study economic sciences; all five of his older siblings were graduates, in engineering, medicine (two), philosophy and law. In the capital city, he signed for second division club Rayo Vallecano as an amateur in order to continue his studies. In 1969–70 he played 30 games and scored 14 goals, leading to Barcelona signing him for 9 million Spanish pesetas and the loan of two players to Rayo, who used the money to provide lighting at their Campo de Fútbol de Vallecas. He would complete the final two years of his academic course in the city of Barcelona.

=== Barcelona ===
Dueñas had suffered a right meniscus injury playing for Rayo against Español on 19 April 1970, and did not make his debut for Barcelona until 28 February 1971, a 1–1 draw at Valencia. In his next game at the Camp Nou he scored a hat-trick in a 5–2 win over Sevilla. The season ended with him scoring in a 1–1 draw away to Atlético Madrid on the final day; the draw meant that both teams missed out on the league title, which went to Valencia.

After the season ended, Dueñas played nine games and scored four goals – each in a different tie – as Barcelona won the Copa del Generalísimo. He played 63 minutes of the final before being substituted for Ramón Alfonseda, who scored the last goal of a 4–3 extra-time win over Valencia.

The change in Barcelona's manager from Vic Buckingham to Rinus Michels resulted in less playing time for Dueñas. On 22 September 1971, he scored twice in a 2–1 win over Leeds United in the Inter-Cities Fairs Cup Trophy play-off – between the first and last winners of the scrapped Inter-Cities Fairs Cup – thus giving his club the trophy to keep permanently.

=== Later career ===
Dueñas left Barcelona in 1972 for Granada. He had caught the attention of the Andalusian side on 14 March 1971, when he had assisted both goals by Carles Rexach in an away win. On 28 October 1973, he returned to the Camp Nou as his team lost 4–0 in Johan Cruyff's first game for Barcelona. He left in 1977 for Palencia of Segunda División B, playing two seasons, the latter ending in their first-ever promotion to the second tier; this was under the management of former Real Madrid and Spain national team winger Paco Gento.

== Personal life ==
After retiring from playing in 1979, Dueñas was general manager of Palencia for two more years. He worked in a fruit company and as the Madrid delegate for the Barcelona-based metalworks Bamesa.
