= 1963–64 FC Barcelona season =

65th season in existence of FC Barcelona

FC Barcelona
1963–64 season
- President: Enric Llaudet
- Manager: César Rodríguez
- La Liga: Second
- Copa del Generalísimo: Semifinal
- Cup Win.Cup: Second round

The 1963–64 season was the 65th season for FC Barcelona.

The team toured South America and Mexico in the summer of 1964.

== Results ==
GAMES
25-08-63 . FRIENDLY MATARO-BARCELONA 0-9

31-08-63 . Ramón de Carranza Trophy BENFICA-BARCELONA 3-2

01-09-63 . Ramón de Carranza Trophy BARCELONA-VALENCIA 4-1

03-09-63 . FRIENDLY GRAMENET-BARCELONA 3-4

03-09-63 . SOUTH AMERICA TOUR GUADALAJARA-BARCELONA 1-1

05-09-63 . SOUTH AMERICA TOUR UNIVERSITAD MEXICO-BARCELONA 1-6

08-09-63 . SOUTH AMERICA TOUR ORO-BARCELONA 2-1

14-09-63 . LIGA VALENCIA-BARCELONA 0-0 suspend 28 minute

19-09-63 . FRIENDLY EUROPA-BARCELONA 1-3

21-09-63 . LIGA BARCELONA-PONTEVEDRA 3-1

24-09-63 . Cup Win.Cup SHELBOURNE-BARCELONA 0-2

26-09-63 . FRIENDLY CALELLA-BARCELONA 3-5

29-09-63 . LIGA MURCIA-BARCELONA 1-5

06-10-63 . LIGA BARCELONA-ATLETICO MADRID 3-1

13-10-63 . LIGA ZARAGOZA-BARCELONA 2-0

15-10-63 . Cup Win.Cup BARCELONA-SHELBOURNE 3-1

20-10-63 . LIGA BARCELONA-VALLADOLID 2-1

27-10-63 . FRIENDLY BARCELONA-RACING PARIS 2-3

02-11-63 . LIGA BARCELONA-SEVILLA 6-0

06-11-63 . FRIENDLY GIMNASTIC TARRAGONA-BARCELONA 0-8

10-11-63 . LIGA LEVANTE-BARCELONA 4-5

11-11-63 . FRIENDLY OLOT-BARCELONA 4-5

13-11-63 . LIGA VALENCIA-BARCELONA 0-2

17-11-63 . LIGA BARCELONA-OVIEDO 2-1

20-11-63 . Cup Win.Cup BARCELONA-Hamburger SV 4-4

24-11-63 . LIGA ATHLETIC BILBAO-BARCELONA 2-0

01-12-63 . FRIENDLY BARCELONA-BOCA JUNIORS 1-2

07-12-63 . LIGA BARCELONA-ELCHE 3-0

11-12-63 . Cup Win.Cup Hamburger SV-BARCELONA 0-0

15-12-63 . LIGA REAL MADRID-BARCELONA 4-0

18-12-63 . Cup Win.Cup Hamburger SV-BARCELONA 3-2 PLAY-OFF

22-12-63 . LIGA BARCELONA-CORDOBA 3-1

25-12-63 - FRIENDLY JUPITER-BARCELONA, 1-5

29-12-63 . LIGA ESPANYOL-BARCELONA 2-2

05-01-64 . LIGA BARCELONA-BETIS 4-1

12-01-64 . LIGA BARCELONA VALENCIA 4-0

19-01-64 . LIGA PONTEVEDRA-BARCELONA 0-2

21-01-64 . FRIENDLY VILLANUEVA-BARCELONA 1-8

26-01-64 . LIGA BARCELONA-MURCIA 4-1

02-02-64 . LIGA ATLETICO MADRID-BARCELONA 1-0

08-02-64 . LIGA BARCELONA-ZARAGOZA 3-3

11-02-64 . FRIENDLY COMBINAT NACIONAL-BARCELONA 3-2

16-02-64 . LIGA VALLADOLID-BARCELONA 2-0

23-02-64 . LIGA SEVILLA-BARCELONA 1-1

01-03-64 . LIGA BARCELONA-LEVANTE 6-2

04-03-64 . FRIENDLY CASTELLON-BARCELONA 2-2

15-03-64 . LIGA OVIEDO-BARCELONA 2-1

18-03-64 . LIGA BARCELONA-ATHLETIC BILBAO 2-1

22-03-64 . LIGA ELCHE-BARCELONA 0-0

30-03-64 . LIGA BARCELONA-REAL MADRID 1-2

31-03-64 . FRIENDLY IGUALADA-BARCELONA 1-5

07-04-64 . FRIENDLY ANDERLECHT-BARCELONA 4-2

12-04-64 . LIGA CORDOBA-BARCELONA 0-2

19-04-64 . LIGA BARCELONA-ESPANYOL 5-0

25-04-64 . LIGA BETIS-BARCELONA 2-3

30-04-64 . FRIENDLY BARCELONA-GUADALAJARA 2-2

03-05-64 . COPA GENERALISIMO BARCELONA-TENERIFE 7-0

06-05-64 - FRIENDLY BARCELONA - ANDERLECHT 3-0

10-05-64 . COPA GENERALISIMO TENERIFE-BARCELONA 2-1

17-05-64 . COPA GENERALISIMO CORDOBA-BARCELONA 1-2

20-05-64 . COPA GENERALISIMO BARCELONA-CORDOBA 4-2

24-05-64 . COPA GENERALISIMO BARCELONA-ESPANYOL 3-1

30-05-64 . COPA GENERALISIMO ESPANYOL-BARCELONA 2-4

06-06-64 . COPA GENERALISIMO BARCELONA-ZARAGOZA 3-2

21-06-64 . FRIENDLY PALAFRUGELL-BARCELONA 1-7

25-06-64 . FRIENDLY SABADELL-BARCELONA 4-2

28-06-64 . COPA GENERALISIMO ZARAGOZA-BARCELONA 2-0

09-07-64 . CUADRANGULAR TOURNAMENT RIVER PLATE-BARCELONA 5-1

12-07-64 . CUADRANGULAR TOURNAMENT BOCA JUNIORS-BARCELONA 3-2

16-07-64 . CUADRANGULAR TOURNAMENT BOTAFOGO-BARCELONA 2-0

19-07-64 . SOUTH AMERICA TOUR TALLERES CORDOBA-BARCELONA 1-1

25-07-64 . SOUTH AMERICA TOUR SPORTING CRISTAL-BARCELONA 2-2

29-07-64 . SOUTH AMERICA TOUR ATLANTE-BARCELONA 2-2

31-07-64 . SOUTH AMERICA TOUR GUADALAJARA-BARCELONA 2-3

05-08-64 . SOUTH AMERICA TOUR MONTERREY-BARCELONA 4-4
