= Ramoní (footballer, born 1946) =

Spanish footballer

Personal information
- Full name: Ramón Díaz Cruz
- Date of birth: 19 August 1946 (age 80)
- Place of birth: Cádiz, Spain
- Height: 1.80 m (5 ft 11 in)

Senior career*
| Years | Team | Apps | (Gls) |
| 1964–1968 | Espanyol | 55 | (1) |
| 1968–1969 | Granada | 10 | (0) |
| 1969–1971 | Barcelona | 9 | (0) |
| 1971–1972 | Sevilla | 6 | (0) |
| 1973–1974 | CD San Fernando | | |
| Total | | 80 | (1) |
- * Club domestic league appearances and goals

Ramón Díaz Cruz (born 19 August 1946), known as Ramoní, is a Spanish former professional footballer who played as a midfielder.

== Career ==
Born in Cádiz, Ramoní played for Espanyol, Granada, Barcelona, Sevilla and CD San Fernando.
