= 1938–39 FC Barcelona season =

40th season in existence of FC Barcelona

FC Barcelona
1938–39 season
- President: Management commission
- Manager: Vacant
- Torneig Ciutat de Barcelona: Unfinished

The 1938–39 season was the 40th season for FC Barcelona.

== Results ==
Torneig Ciutat de Barcelona

30 October 1938 Jornada 1	FC Barcelona	3 - 0	Gràcia SC	Barcelona
	García; Call			Stadium: Camp de les Corts; Referee: Mateo

6 November 1938 Jornada 2	CE Júpiter	1 - 5	FC Barcelona	Barcelona
	Goal		Diví; Call; García; Sauras	Stadium: Camp de les Corts

13 November 1938 Jornada 3	CE Europa	4 - 1	FC Barcelona	Barcelona
	Goal		Sauras	Stadium: Camp del Guinardó

20 November 1938 Jornada 4	FC Martinenc	2 - 1	FC Barcelona	Barcelona
	Goal		Forn

27 November 1938 Jornada 5	FC Barcelona	3 - 1	UE Sants	Barcelona
	Mateo; Vergés		Goal	Stadium: Camp de les Corts

4 December 1938 Jornada 6	FC Barcelona	2 - 4	Avenç de l'Sport	Barcelona
	Mateo; Diví		Goal	Stadium: Camp de les Corts

18 December 1938 Jornada 7	SC Gràcia	1 - 3	FC Barcelona	Barcelona
	Goal		León; Vergés

25 December 1938 Jornada 8	FC Barcelona	10 - 1	CE Júpiter	Barcelona
				Stadium: Camp de les Corts

1 January 1939 Jornada 9	FC Barcelona	3 - 3	CE Europa	Barcelona
				Stadium: Camp de les Corts

8 January 1939 Jornada 10	FC Barcelona	3 - 1	FC Martinenc	Barcelona
				Stadium: Camp de les Corts

January 1939 Jornada 11	UE Sants	suspend	FC Barcelona	Barcelona
				Stadium: Camp del carrer Galileu

January 1939 Jornada 12	Avenç de l'Sport	suspend	FC Barcelona	Barcelona

=== Friendly ===
- 29 June Barcelona - Athletic Bilbao 9-1′
- 2 July Barcelona - Zaragoza 0-1.
- 2 July Barcelona - Horta 4-2.
- 9 July Barcelona - Alavés 2-4.
- 9 July Barcelona - Poblesec 4-2.
- 11 July Barcelona - Espanyol 3-1.
- 16 July Barcelona - Recuperación de Levante 3-2.
- 18 July Barcelona - Europa 2-5.
- 18 July Barcelona - Recuperación de Catalunya 3-1.
- 1. Reopening Camp de Les Corts and first game under the new regime of Franco. A Spanish team wearing the Barça faces the Athletic Bilbao. A portion of the proceeds is allocated to subsidize the Combatiente party.
