= 2016 Copa del Rey final =

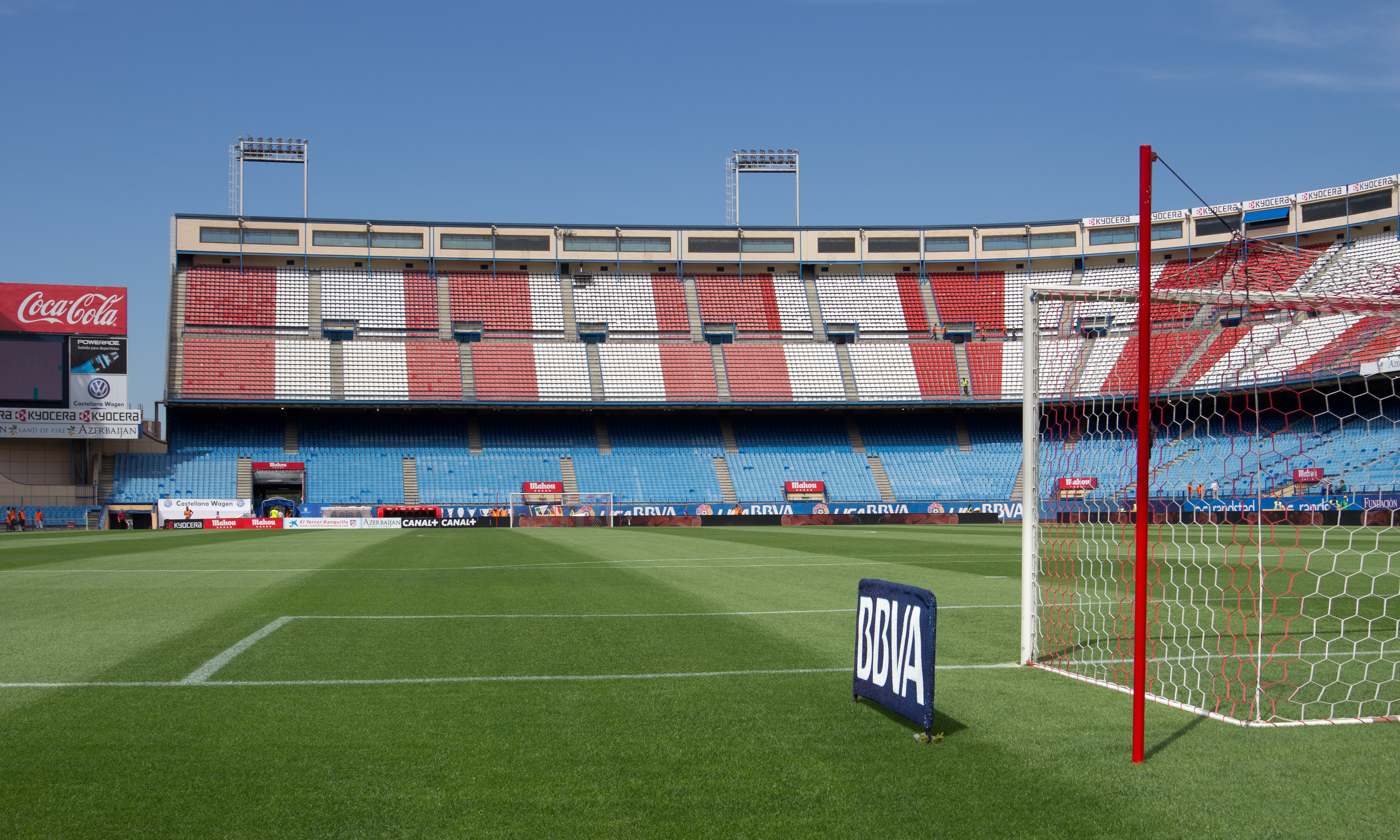
- Vicente Calderón Stadium in Madrid hosted the final
- Event: 2015–16 Copa del Rey
Barcelona	Sevilla
2	0
- After extra time
- Date: 22 May 2016
- Venue: Vicente Calderón, Madrid
- Man of the Match: Andrés Iniesta (Barcelona)
- Referee: Carlos del Cerro Grande
- Attendance: 54,907

The 2016 Copa del Rey final was a football match played on 22 May 2016 to decide the winner of the 2015–16 Copa del Rey, the 114th edition of Spain's premier football cup since its establishment (including two seasons where two rival editions were played). It was played at the Vicente Calderón Stadium in Madrid.

It was won by defending champions Barcelona, who defeated Sevilla 2–0 after extra time to achieve their record-extending 28th title. Andrés Iniesta was named man of the match despite Lionel Messi's two assists in both of Barcelona's goals.

As Barcelona won both the 2015–16 La Liga and the Copa del Rey, the 2016 Supercopa de España was also held between Barcelona and Sevilla.

== Background ==
Barcelona had previously played in 37 Copa del Rey finals, second only to Real Madrid's 39, and had a record 27 victories. They were the reigning champions, having defeated Athletic Bilbao 3–1 in the previous year's final at their Camp Nou.

Sevilla had been to seven finals, winning five, most recently in 2010 when they defeated Atlético Madrid 2–0 at the Camp Nou. Their last defeat was in 1962, 2–1 to Real Madrid. The 2016 final was the first between the two sides.

It was the 13th such final at the Vicente Calderón Stadium in Madrid, home of Atlético Madrid. Barcelona previously won the final at the ground in 1968, 1981 and 2012, and lost in 1974 and 1986. It was Sevilla's first final at the stadium, although three of their victories came elsewhere in the Spanish capital.

The two teams began the season against each other in the 2015 UEFA Super Cup in Tbilisi on 11 August, which Barcelona won 5–4 after extra time.

Both teams had victories by wide margins on their way to the final; Barcelona scored 25 goals and conceded five in eight games, while Sevilla scored 22 times in their eight matches, conceding only two goals in the second leg of their semi-final.

== Route to the final ==
Barcelona			Round	Sevilla
Opponent	Result	Legs		Opponent	Result	Legs
Villanovense	6–1	0–0 away; 6–1 home	Round of 32	UD Logroñés	5–0	3–0 away; 2–0 home
Espanyol	6–1	4–1 home; 2–0 away	Round of 16	Real Betis	6–0	2–0 away; 4–0 home
Athletic Bilbao	5–2	2–1 away; 3–1 home	Quarter-finals	Mirandés	5–0	2–0 home; 3–0 away
Valencia	8–1	7–0 home; 1–1 away	Semi-finals	Celta Vigo	6–2	4–0 home; 2–2 away

=== Barcelona ===
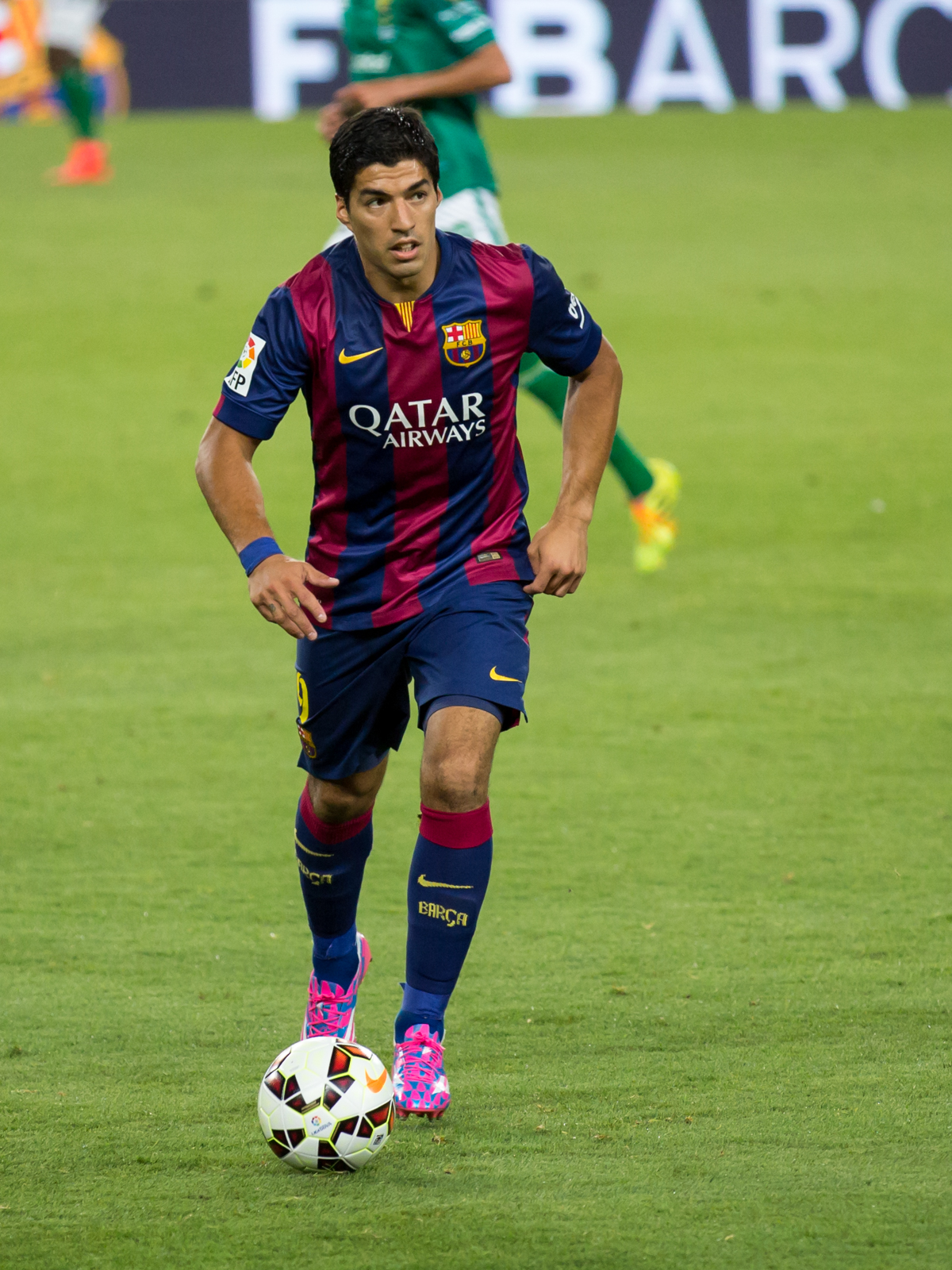
Luis Suárez scored five times in Barcelona's run to the final, including four goals in their 7–0 win over Valencia.

Barcelona, of La Liga, entered the tournament in the last 32, against Villanovense of the Segunda División B. The first leg in Villanueva de la Serena, on 28 October 2015, was a goalless draw, with manager Luis Enrique fielding a young and inexperienced side. In the second leg on 2 December at the Camp Nou, however, Barcelona triumphed 6–1. Dani Alves opened the scoring with a long-range strike in the fourth minute, and Sandro added a hat-trick and Munir a brace.

In the round of 16, Barcelona played city rivals Espanyol in the Derbi barceloní. They opened on 6 January 2016 with a 4–1 home victory with goals from Lionel Messi (2), Gerard Piqué and Neymar, after the visitors had taken the lead through Felipe Caicedo in the ninth minute. Hernán Pérez and Pape Diop were sent off for Espanyol late on, the latter for dissent. A week later on their trip to the RCDE Stadium, Barcelona won 2–0 with a Munir goal in each half; the young Spaniard started the game due to Luis Suárez's suspension for his part in the post-match skirmish from the first game.

Barcelona met Athletic Bilbao in the quarter-finals, a repeat of the last year's final. On 20 January at the San Mamés, they won 2–1 with first-half strikes from Munir and Neymar. A week later in the second game, the Basques took the lead through Iñaki Williams, but Barcelona replied in the second half with Suárez, Piqué and Neymar's goals.

In the semi-finals, Barcelona met Valencia and won 7–0 in the home game on 3 February; Suárez scored four times and Messi three. A week later, in the second match at the Mestalla, the hosts took the lead through Álvaro Negredo and Wilfrid Kaptoum equalised late on, stretching Barcelona's unbeaten run to 29 games.

=== Sevilla ===
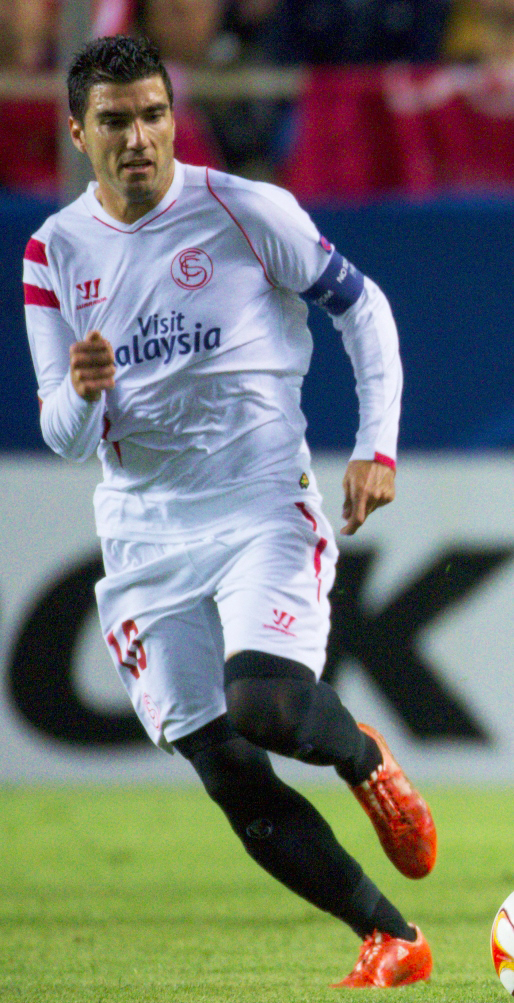
José Antonio Reyes captained Sevilla on their run to the final, scoring twice.

Sevilla, also of La Liga, entered at the same stage against a third-tier opponent, UD Logroñés. In the first leg in La Rioja on 2 December 2015, they won 3–0 through goals by Coke, Michael Krohn-Dehli and Ciro Immobile. Two weeks later, at the Ramón Sánchez Pizjuán, they won 2–0 through goals from Immobile and captain José Antonio Reyes.

Like Barcelona, in the last 16 Sevilla met their municipal rivals, Real Betis. They travelled away for the first game on 6 January 2016, winning 2–0 with a strike in each half by Krohn-Dehli and Grzegorz Krychowiak. Hosting the second leg, they won 4–0; Reyes and Adil Rami struck in the first half and Frenchmen Kevin Gameiro and Gaël Kakuta in the second.

In the quarter-finals, Sevilla drew Mirandés, the only Segunda División team remaining. On 21 January, they won 2–0 in the home leg; Steven Nzonzi scored in the first half and Vitolo secured the score in added time. A week later in Miranda de Ebro, Sevilla extended their lead with a ninth-minute penalty by Vicente Iborra, and added later goals by Juan Muñoz and Coke.

Sevilla were tasked with in-form Celta Vigo in the semi-finals. Hosting the first game on 4 February, Rami headed the Andalusians ahead at the end of the first half, and Gameiro, who had earlier missed a penalty, scored two goals in the space of three minutes. Ex-Celta player Krohn-Dehli later confirmed a 4–0 win. A week later at Balaídos, Celta scored twice through former Sevilla striker Iago Aspas, but the contributions of Éver Banega and Yevhen Konoplyanka confirmed a draw, despite the late dismissal of Nzonzi.

== Pre-match ==
There had been a ban on displays of the Estelada, the flag of Catalan independence, at the match for "operational and security reasons". A Madrid judge overruled the ban after Barcelona complained, citing freedom of expression; Carles Puigdemont, President of the Generalitat of Catalonia, would have boycotted the game if the ban remained. Before the ban was repealed, Catalan nationalists planned to give out 10,000 flags of Scotland, equating the British constituent country with their region.

== Match ==
=== Summary ===
Javier Mascherano was sent-off for Barcelona in the 36th minute for dragging down Kevin Gameiro by the shirt as he ran towards the penalty area. Éver Banega also received a red card in injury time for a foul that denied Neymar an obvious goalscoring chance. There were no goals in the 90 minutes, with the match going into extra-time. Jordi Alba scored the opening goal for Barcelona in the 97th minute with a low, left-footed finish from six yards across the goalkeeper after he ran onto a pass from Lionel Messi from midfield. Neymar made it 2–0 in the last moments of the match with a low finish from the left after a short pass from Messi. Daniel Carriço was sent off for Sevilla in stoppage time at the end of extra time when he received two yellow cards within 30 seconds, first for a tackle on Messi and the second for insulting the referee. Although Messi provided the two critical assists for both Barcelona's goals in the extra-time, it was Andrés Iniesta who was named man of the match for his overall performance.

22 May 2016
21:30 CEST

Barcelona	2–0 (a.e.t.)	Sevilla
Alba 97'; Neymar 120+2'	Report

Vicente Calderón, Madrid
Attendance: 54,907
Referee: Carlos del Cerro Grande

Barcelona	Sevilla

GK	1	(Germany) Marc-André ter Stegen
RB	6	(Brazil) Dani Alves	(yellow card) 90'
CB	3	(Spain) Gerard Piqué
CB	14	(Argentina) Javier Mascherano	(red card) 36'
LB	18	(Spain) Jordi Alba	(yellow card) 87'	(substituted off) 120'
CM	4	(Croatia) Ivan Rakitić		(substituted off) 46'
CM	5	(Spain) Sergio Busquets
CM	8	(Spain) Andrés Iniesta (c)	(yellow card) 90'
RW	10	(Argentina) Lionel Messi
LW	11	(Brazil) Neymar	(yellow card) 89'
CF	9	(Uruguay) Luis Suárez		(substituted off) 57'
Substitutes:
GK	13	(Chile) Claudio Bravo
MF	7	(Turkey) Arda Turan
MF	12	(Brazil) Rafinha		(substituted on) 57'
FW	17	(Spain) Munir
MF	20	(Spain) Sergi Roberto		(substituted on) 120'
MF	22	(Spain) Aleix Vidal
DF	24	(France) Jérémy Mathieu		(substituted on) 46'
Head Coach:
(Spain) Luis Enrique

GK	1	(Spain) Sergio Rico
RB	25	(Brazil) Mariano		(substituted off) 80'
CB	6	(Portugal) Daniel Carriço	(yellow card) 120+1' (yellow-red card) 120+1'
CB	3	(France) Adil Rami	(yellow card) 73'
LB	18	(Spain) Sergio Escudero	(yellow card) 104'
CM	4	(Poland) Grzegorz Krychowiak	(yellow card) 92'
CM	8	(Spain) Vicente Iborra	(yellow card) 90+5'	(substituted off) 106'
RW	23	(Spain) Coke (c)
AM	19	(Argentina) Éver Banega	(red card) 90+2'
LW	20	(Spain) Vitolo	(yellow card) 75'
CF	9	(France) Kevin Gameiro	(yellow card) 114'
Substitutes:
GK	31	(Spain) David Soria
MF	10	(Spain) José Antonio Reyes
FW	11	(Spain) Juan Muñoz
MF	14	(Uruguay) Sebastián Cristóforo
DF	21	(Argentina) Nicolás Pareja
MF	22	(Ukraine) Yevhen Konoplyanka	(yellow card) 102'	(substituted on) 80'
FW	24	(Spain) Fernando Llorente		(substituted on) 106'
Head Coach:
(Spain) Unai Emery

Assistant referees:
Juan Carlos Yuste Jiménez
Roberto Alonso Fernández
Fourth official:
Jesús Gil Manzano
Additional assistant referees:
Ángel Nevado Rodríguez

Match rules

- 90 minutes
- 30 minutes of extra time if necessary
- Penalty shoot-out if score is still level
- Seven named substitutes, of which up to three may be used
