= Enric Llaudet =

Enric Llaudet Ponsa (Barcelona, Catalonia, Spain, 25 September 1916 – 15 August 2003) was a Spanish businessman and sports leader who chaired FC Barcelona between 1961 and 1968.

== Biography ==
Born into a family of the Catalan bourgeoisie, his father, Josep Llaudet, who had been manager of the FC Barcelona was an industrialist, who in 1901 Yarns Llaudet had founded a business dedicated to the manufacture of cotton yarn. Llaudet son inherited the family business, when this was one of the main Catalan textile industry, already available from several factories in Catalonia, including an own colony in Sant Joan de les Abadesses.

In 1953 Enric Llaudet became a director on the board of FC Barcelona presiding Francesc Miró-Sans. He was a member of the finance committee and the sports, then president of the sections of the club. In 1956 was responsible for Club Deportivo Condal, a subsidiary Barca he played that year in Primera División.

Following the resignation of Miro-Sans, in February 1961, Llaudet was submitted to the elections to head the club, in competition with another former director, Jaume Fuset. In the elections, held on 7 June 1961, the partners commissioners-who by then were the only voting-they settled on Llaudet nominated by a narrow margin of 24 votes (122 to 98).

Llaudet found a club in a difficult economic situation, dragging a debt of 289 million ESP, largely for the construction of the Camp Nou. Shortly after his arrival at the office, also faced the departure of three of the most emblematic players of the club's history: first, Ladislao Kubala and Antoni Ramallets, removed, and the other Luis Suarez, sold to Internazionale for 25 million pesetas. With this transfer millionaire, the most expensive in football history to date, the new president tried to soothe the delicate financial situation of the club.

The progress of its main figures and the critical economic burden the Barca team athletic performance during the tenure of Llaudet. In just six and a half degrees were achieved with only a Copa del Generalísimo in 1963 and a trophy shows 1966.

Llaudet saw in the sale of the old stadium in Barcelona, the Camp de Les Corts, the only way to overcome the economic hardship of the entity. After long negotiations with the mayor Porcioles in 1962 the City of Barcelona gave green light to the reclassification of the land area that went from green to construction land, which are enhanced substantially. Finally, in 1966 materialized Les Corts selling real estate to Habitat, which the FC Barcelona won 226 million euros to restore their battered chests allowed.

Success in this operation was prompted Llaudet won the confidence of partners in 1965 unanimously re-elected him as president, beating at the polls to Josep Maria Vendrell by 164 votes to 35.

That same year, Llaudet prompted a vote to officially christen the new Barca stadium, which was opened eight years ago. He was eventually chosen the name of the FC Barcelona stadium,ahead of other proposals asStadiumandBarça Camp Nou. A year later, the summer of 1966, Llaudet prompted the establishment of the Joan Gamper Trophy, in homage to the founder of the club.

Despite economic recovery, the title drought in Llaudet was led during his second term that the establishment of a strong current opposition, which led by Nicolau Casaus requested the resignation of the president. Among the sporting management Llaudet question highlights the fiasco that saw the signing of the Brazil Stained Walter da Silva, 1967 when the lineup was banned foreign players in Spain. After pressing unsuccessfully for the National Sports Delegation to achieve opening of borders, Llaudet stated that if a player could not play, "will be my chauffeur has always made me dream to have a black driver ".

Given the social divide between club members in the assembly of electors of 1 September 1967 Enric Llaudet announced the early elections, which did not appear. The elections were held on 17 January 1968 and, as requested by himself Llaudet was elected by acclamation a consensus candidate, led by Narcís de Carreras.

It was not until the eighties, under the command of Josep Lluís Núñez, when the club returned to chair the Committee on Economic and Statuary.

In early August 2003 was admitted Teknon Clinic of Barcelona, suffering from pneumonia. He died in hospital on 15 August 2003.

=== Trophies won by club during Enric Llaudet presidency ===
- Copa del Rey (1):
  - 1962–63
- Inter-Cities Fairs Cup (1):
  - 1965–66

| Preceded by Francesc Miró-Sans | President of FC Barcelona; 1961–1968 | Succeeded by Narcís de Carreras |
