= 1937–38 FC Barcelona season =

39th season in existence of FC Barcelona

FC Barcelona
1937–38 season
- President: Management commission
- Manager: Patrick O'Connell
- Liga Catalana: First
- Campionat de Catalunya: First

The 1937–38 season was the 39th season for FC Barcelona.

== Results ==
Amistosos

26 September 1937	FC Vilafranca	2–0	FC Barcelona	Vilafranca
				Referee: Castro

3 October 1937	CE Europa	3–0	FC Barcelona	Guinardo
				Referee: Prieto

17 October 1937	Iluro SC	7–2	FC Barcelona
			Vallve	Referee: Burguet

23 January 1938	FC Barcelona	1–3	CE Europa	Barcelona
	Homedes			Stadium: Les Corts; Referee: R.Sauri

30 January 1938	FC Barcelona	4–1	UE Sants	Barcelona
	Galtes 11'; Gerardo 26'; Pages 29'; Rigual 55'			Stadium: Les Corts; Referee: Nello

6 February 1938	FC Barcelona	2–4	CE Manresa	Barcelona
	Galtes 8'; Gerardo 67'			Stadium: Les Corts; Referee: Sauri

13 February 1938	UE Sant Andreu	4–4	FC Barcelona	Sant Andreu
			Gerardo; Leon; Rodo	Referee: Simon

27 February 1938	FC Barcelona	4–2	UE Sant Andreu	Barcelona
	Guix; Gerardo; Leon			Stadium: Les Corts; Referee: Oltra Marti

6 March 1938	FC Barcelona	9–2	Mariners Anglesos	Barcelona
				Stadium: Les Corts

6 March 1938	FC Barcelona	4–1	CE Júpiter	Barcelona
	Gari; Gerardo; Leon			Stadium: Les Corts; Referee: Nelo

13 March 1938	UE Sants	4–0	FC Barcelona	Barcelona
				Stadium: Sants; Referee: Vives

29 May 1938	FC Barcelona	7–1	Gràcia FC	Barcelona
	Leon; Cervera; Moral			Stadium: Les Corts; Referee: Llopart

5 June 1938	FC Barcelona	5–2	UE Sants	Barcelona
				Stadium: Les Corts

26 June 1938 Festival benefic del Cos de Carabiners	Lleons Rojos	2–3	FC Barcelona	Barcelona
			Pages; Leon; Morral	Stadium: Sarria; Referee: Sola Marimon

7 August 1938 A benefici de la Creu Roja	FC Barcelona	1–5	Seleccio Guardies D,Assalt	Barcelona
				Stadium: Les Corts; Referee: Simon

Campionat de Catalunya

17 October 1937 Jornada 1	FC Barcelona	3–1	FC Badalona	Barcelona
	Munlloch 25' 43'; Rigual 51'	Report]	Farré 66'	Stadium: Camp de les Corts; Referee: Puntís

25 October 1937 Jornada 2	Girona FC	3–2	FC Barcelona	Girona
	Falgàs 30'; Saiz 60' 86'	Report]	Rigual 70'; Rodó 80'	Stadium: Camp de Vista Alegre; Referee: Blanes

31 October 1937 Jornada 3	FC Barcelona	9–1	CD Español	Barcelona
	Rigual 13' 50' 74'; Pagès 35'; Estrada 60'; Bardina 63'; Alonso (pp) 65'; Munlloch	Report]	Carlitos 70'	Stadium: Camp de les Corts; Referee: Simó

7 November 1937 Jornada 4	CD Europa	3–0	FC Barcelona	Barcelona
	Font 2' 9' 33'	Report]		Referee: Simó

14 November 1937 Jornada 5	CD Júpiter	2–0	FC Barcelona	Barcelona
	Figueras 40'; Font 76'	Report]		Referee: Simó

21 November 1937 Jornada 6	FC Barcelona	7–0	CE Sabadell	Barcelona
	Rigual; Bardina; Homedes; Pagès	Report]		Stadium: Camp de les Corts; Referee: Montiagut

28 November 1937 Jornada 7	SC Granollers	1–4	FC Barcelona	Granollers
	Armengol	Report]	Munlloch 2' 20'; Gerardo 30'; Rigual 76'	Referee: Puntís

5 December 1937 Jornada 8	FC Badalona	0–2	FC Barcelona	Badalona
		Report]	Rigual	Stadium: Camp de l'avinguda de Navarra; Referee: Puntís

12 December 1937 Jornada 9	FC Barcelona	1–1	Girona FC	Barcelona
	Munlloch 65'	Report]	Martín 18'	Stadium: Camp de les Corts; Referee: Simó

19 December 1937 Jornada 10	CD Español	0–1	FC Barcelona	Barcelona
		Report]	Rigual	Stadium: Estadi de Sarrià; Referee: Solà Marimon

26 December 1937 Jornada 11	FC Barcelona	2–0	CD Europa	Barcelona
	Argemí; Estrada	Report]		Stadium: Camp de les Corts; Referee: Blanes

2 January 1938 Jornada 12	FC Barcelona	4–0	CD Júpiter	Barcelona
	Rigual; Pagès; Gerardo	Report]		Stadium: Camp de les Corts; Referee: Blat

9 January 1938 Jornada 13	CE Sabadell	1–3	FC Barcelona	Sabadell
	Egea	Report]	Estrada 15'; Bardina 75'; Rigual 80'	Stadium: Camp de la Creu Alta; Referee: Puntís

16 January 1938 Jornada 14	FC Barcelona	4–0	SC Granollers	Barcelona
	Rigual; Pagès; Gerardo	Report]		Stadium: Camp de les Corts; Referee: Peris

Campionat de Lliga (Lliga Catalana)

27 February 1938 Jornada 1	FC Barcelona	10–1	CE Manresa	Barcelona
	Pagès 15'; Mateo 22' 69' 74' 83'; Gerardo	Report]	Torruella 47'	Stadium: Camp de les Corts; Referee: Gabarró

3 April 1938 Jornada 2	FC Badalona	1–2	FC Barcelona	Badalona
	Mena	Report]	Mateu 13'	Stadium: Camp de l'avinguda Navarra; Referee: Soler

10 April 1938 Jornada 3	FC Barcelona	3–3	CD Europa	Barcelona
	León 21'; Mateo 53' 61'	Report]	Freixas 26' 38'; Canovas	Referee: Gabarró

17 April 1938 Jornada 4	FC Martinenc	5–2	FC Barcelona	Barcelona
	Espier 15' 62' 72'; Pallàs 20'; Sala 44'	Report]	Gerardo 8'; Morral 27'	Referee: Gabarró

24 April 1938 Jornada 5	FC Barcelona	8–0	Avenç de l'Sport	Barcelona
	Gerardo; Mateo	Report]		Stadium: Camp de les Corts; Referee: Nello

1 May 1938 Jornada 6	UE Sants	1–7	FC Barcelona	Barcelona
	García 81'	Report]	Mateu 21' 56'; Gerardo 43' 63'; Diago II (pp) 69'	Referee: Solà Marimon

8 May 1938 Jornada 7	FC Barcelona	8–0	Iluro SC	Barcelona
	Morral 6'; Mateu 30' 52' 75' 78' 81' 87'; Gerardo 46'	Report]		Stadium: Camp de les Corts; Referee: Álvarez

15 May 1938 Jornada 8	CD Español	0–4	FC Barcelona	Barcelona
		Report]	Mateu 49' 56' 60'	Stadium: Estadi de Sarrià; Referee: Kuntz

22 May 1938 Jornada 9	FC Barcelona	8–0	CD Júpiter	Barcelona
	Gerardo; Pagès; León; Diví	Report]		Stadium: Camp de les Corts; Referee: Ribas

12 June 1938 Jornada 11	FC Barcelona	4–1	FC Badalona	Barcelona
	León 15'; Gerardo; Morral	Report]	Ferrer 30'	Stadium: Camp de les Corts; Referee: Menal

3 July 1938 Jornada 13	FC Barcelona	6–2	FC Martinenc	Barcelona
	Gerardo 47'; Morral 70'	Report]	Vilches 65'; Salas 80'	Stadium: Camp de les Corts; Referee: Simón

10 July 1938 Jornada 14	Avenç de l'Sport	5–1	FC Barcelona	Barcelona
	Calaveras 11'; Morales 19' 53'; Torres 74'; González 81'	Report]	Mateu 14'	Referee: Simón

17 July 1938 Jornada 15	FC Barcelona	5–2	UE Sants	Barcelona
	Mateu 10' 74' 81'; Pagès 61'; Morral 83'	Report]	Judici 5'; García	Stadium: Camp de les Corts; Referee: Simón

31 July 1938 Jornada 12	CD Europa	2–3	FC Barcelona	Barcelona
	Romero 26'; Ferrer 29'	Report]	Gerardo 23' 68'; Mateu 81'	Referee: Gabarró

14 August 1938 Jornada 17	FC Barcelona	6–2	CD Español	Barcelona
	Gerardo 12'; Mateu 85'; Cervera 37'	Report	Martínez 19'	Stadium: Camp de les Corts; Referee: Gallardo

21 August 1938 Jornada 18	CD Júpiter	0–2	FC Barcelona	Barcelona
		Report]	León; Diví	Referee: Solà

28 August 1938 Jornada 16	Iluro SC	1–6	FC Barcelona	Mataró
	Petit II	Report	Gerardo; Mateu; Diví; Oller; León

- The second round match against Manresa was not disputed withdraw from the competition.
