= 1907–08 FC Barcelona season =

9th season in existence of FC Barcelona

FC Barcelona
1907–08 season
- President: Juli Marial
- Campionat de Catalunya: Second
Home colours	Away colours

The 1907–08 season was the ninth season for FC Barcelona.

== Squad ==
Note: Flags indicate national team as defined under FIFA eligibility rules; some limited exceptions apply. Players may hold more than one non-FIFA nationality.

No.	Pos.	Nation	Player
—	GK	(Spain) ESP	Joan Solà
—	DF	(Spain) ESP	Francisco Bru
—	DF	(Spain) ESP	Duran
—	DF	(Spain) ESP	Francesc Sanz
—	DF	(Spain) ESP	Albert Almasqué
—	MF	(Spain) ESP	Enric Peris
—	MF	(Spain) ESP	Joan Grau
—	MF	(Spain) ESP	Romà Forns

No.	Pos.	Nation	Player
—	MF	(Spain) ESP	Juli Marial
—	FW	(England) ENG	Charles Wallace
—	FW	(Spain) ESP	Josep Quirante
—	FW	(Philippines) PHI	Manuel Amechazurra
—	FW	(Spain) ESP	Carles Comamala
—	FW	(Spain) ESP	Miquel Puig
—	FW	(Switzerland) SUI	Otto Oskar Berger

== Results ==
Friendly

28 September 1907	FC Barcelona	2 – 0	FC Espanya	Barcelona
				Stadium: Camp del carrer Muntaner

13 October 1907	FC Barcelona	1 – 4	FC X	Barcelona
	Quirante			Stadium: Camp del carrer Muntaner; Referee: Barraquer

20 October 1907	FC Barcelona	3 – 2	FC Espanya	Barcelona
	Mendez; Amechazurra			Stadium: Camp del carrer Muntaner; Referee: Berdie

24 November 1907	FC Barcelona	5 – 0	FC Espanya	Barcelona
	Barraguer; C.Comamala			Stadium: Camp del carrer Muntaner; Referee: Sampere

27 November 1907	FC Barcelona	7 – 0^{1}	Seawell	Barcelona
	Wallace; Mendez; Quirante			Stadium: Camp del carrer Muntaner; Referee: Lloret

15 December 1907	FC Barcelona	4 – 0	FC X	Barcelona
	Quirante; Mendez			Stadium: Camp del carrer Muntaner; Referee: Almasqué

25 December 1907	Olympique Cettois	1 – 4	FC Barcelona	Franca
			Bru; Quirante; Forns	Stadium: Cette; Referee: Renauld {Franca}

26 December 1907	Sporting Club Nîmois	0 – 0	FC Barcelona	Franca
				Stadium: Nîmes; Referee: Claudel {Franca}

29 December 1907	Olympique de Marseille	9 – 1	FC Barcelona	Franca
			Amechazurra	Stadium: Marsella; Referee: Sanaud {Franca}

5 January 1908	AC Galeno	1 – 2	FC Barcelona	Barcelona
			Quirante	Stadium: Galeno; Referee: Ponz

1 March 1908	FC Barcelona	6 – 1	Còrdova	Barcelona
	Wallace; Sanz; Amechazurra			Stadium: Muntaner; Referee: Park

4 March 1908	FC Barcelona	6 – 1	Còrdova	Barcelona
	Wallace; Amechazurra; Forns			Stadium: Muntaner; Referee: Gruclin

Campionat de Catalunya

19 January 1908 Jornada 1	FC Espanya	1 – 1	FC Barcelona	Barcelona
	Goal		Quirante	Stadium: Camp del carrer Muntaner; Referee: Verdié

16 February 1908 Jornada 5	FC Barcelona	3 – 2	X SC	Barcelona
15:40	Wallace; Comamala		Berdier	Stadium: Camp del carrer Muntaner; Referee: Degollada

23 February 1908 Jornada 6	FC Barcelona	3 – 1	Català SC	Barcelona
	Comamala; Wallace		Goal	Stadium: Camp del carrer Muntaner; Referee: García

8 March 1908 Jornada 8	FC Barcelona	6 – 0	FC Espanya	Barcelona
				Stadium: Camp del carrer Muntaner

22 March 1908 Jornada 10	X SC	1 – 0	FC Barcelona	Barcelona
16:30	Molins			Stadium: Camp del carrer Marina; Attendance: 2.000; Referee: Viñals

29 March 1908 Jornada 7	Català SC	1 – 5	FC Barcelona	Barcelona
16:25				Stadium: Velòdrom de la Bonanova
