= García Castany =

Spanish footballer and coach (1948–2022)

Personal information
- Full name: José Pablo García Castany
- Date of birth: 30 August 1948
- Place of birth: Girona, Spain
- Date of death: 16 June 2022 (aged 73)
- Place of death: Girona, Spain
- Height: 1.77 m (5 ft 10 in)
- Position: Midfielder

Youth career
- 1963–1964: La Salle Girona
- 1964–1965: Barcelona
- 1965–1966: Birmingham City

Senior career*
Years	Team	Apps	(Gls)
1966–1967	Condal	13	(2)
1967–1973	Barcelona	10	(0)
1967–1968	→ Osasuna	24	(6)
1968–1969	→ Calvo Sotelo	27	(6)
1971–1973	→ Zaragoza	49	(8)
1973–1978	Zaragoza	149	(25)
1980–1981	Girona		
1981–1983	Banyoles		

Managerial career
- 1984: Cassà
- 1985: Palamós
- 1985–1987: CE Farners
- 1989: CF Salt
- 1990: Vidreres
- 1991: Lloret
- 1991–1992: CF Salt
- 1995–1996: Lloret
- 1996–1997: Girona
- * Club domestic league appearances and goals

José Pablo García Castany (Note: Josep Pau García Castany in his native Catalonia and Aragon.) (30 August 1948 – 16 June 2022), known as just García Castany, was a Spanish football player and coach. He played midfielder for CD Condal, FC Barcelona, and Real Zaragoza. With Barcelona, he won the Copa del Rey in 1971.

He married Immaculada Cabecerán i Soler, then-captain of the Barcelona women's team, and they had two daughters. García Castany coached his daughters' football teams. He died of dementia in 2022.
