= Salvador Artigas =

Spanish footballer and manager

Salvador Artigas Sahún
Personal information
- Full name: Salvador Artigas Sahún
- Date of birth: 23 February 1913
- Place of birth: Barcelona, Spain
- Date of death: 6 September 1997 (aged 84)
- Place of death: Benidorm, Alicante, Spain
- Position: Defender

Senior career*
Years	Team	Apps	(Gls)
1932–1933	Barcelona	3	(1)
1938–1939	Bordeaux		
1939–1944	Le Mans		
1944–1949	Rennes		
1949–1952	Real Sociedad	70	(2)
1952–1955	Rennes		

Managerial career
- 1952–1955: Rennes
- 1955–1960: Real Sociedad
- 1960–1967: Bordeaux
- 1967–1969: Barcelona
- 1969: Spain
- 1970: Elche
- 1971–1972: Athletic Bilbao
- 1972–1973: Sevilla
- * Club domestic league appearances and goals

Salvador Artigas Sahún (23 February 1913, Barcelona, Spain – 6 September 1997, Benidorm, Spain) was a Spanish footballer and manager.

He was also manager for FC Barcelona, Athletic Bilbao and FC Sevilla. During the Spanish Civil War, Artigas was a pilot for the republican side.
