= Narcís de Carreras =

Narcis de Carreras i Guiteras (1905, in La Bisbal d'Empordà — 1991, in Barcelona) was a Spanish lawyer and president of Barcelona.

Politically close to the Catalan Regionalist League in his youth (he was personal secretary of Francesc Cambó), he chaired Barcelona between 1968 and 1969 (he coined the phrase "Barça is more than a club", which would later be adopted as motto, "més que un club") and became president of La Caixa in 1972, after the death of Miquel Mateu i Pla. In 1987, he was replaced by Juan Antonio Samaranch to run the savings bank.

== Trophies won by club during Narcís de Carreras presidency ==
- Copa del Rey (1):
  - 1967–68
