= Miguel Ángel Bustillo =

Spanish footballer (1946–2016)

Personal information
- Full name: Miguel Ángel Bustillo Lafoz
- Date of birth: 9 September 1946
- Place of birth: Zaragoza, Spanish State
- Date of death: 3 September 2016 (aged 69)
- Place of death: Reus, Tarragona, Spain
- Height: 1.74 m (5 ft 9 in)
- Position: Forward

Youth career
- Real Zaragoza

Senior career*
Years	Team	Apps	(Gls)
- Deportivo Aragón
1966–1969	Zaragoza	46	(22)
- → Mahón (loan)
1969–1972	Barcelona	3	(2)
1972–1977	Málaga	126	(26)
Total		166	(52)

International career
1968–1969	Spain	5	(2)
- * Club domestic league appearances and goals

Miguel Ángel Bustillo Lafoz (9 September 1946 – 3 September 2016) was a Spanish footballer who represented Real Zaragoza, Barcelona and CD Málaga. He was capped five times by the Spain national football team between 1968 and 1969, scoring twice.

== Club career ==
Bustillo started his career with the reserve side of Real Zaragoza, Deportivo Aragón. He spent time on loan at UD Mahón, before joining Barcelona in 1969. His first league game for Barcelona would come in El Clásico, against Real Madrid. Having scored two goals, he was seriously injured in a challenge by Pedro de Felipe, suffering a break in both the superficial and deep layers of the internal lateral ligament, damage to the inner meniscus and a rupture to his anterior cruciate ligament. He never fully recovered from this injury, and would make only two more league appearances for Barcelona, before leaving to join CD Málaga in 1972.

== Death ==
Bustillo died on 3 September 2016.

== Career statistics ==
=== Club ===
Club	Season	League			Cup		Continental		Other		Total	
Club	Season	Division	Apps	Goals	Apps	Goals	Apps	Goals	Apps	Goals	Apps	Goals
Real Zaragoza	1966–67	La Liga	7	1	0	0	1 (Note: Appearances in the UEFA Cup Winners' Cup)	0	0	0	8	1
Real Zaragoza	1967–68	La Liga	19	10	5	2	3 (Note: Appearances in the Inter-Cities Fairs Cup)	2	0	0	27	14
Real Zaragoza	1968–69	La Liga	20	11	0	0	5	3	0	0	25	14
Real Zaragoza	Total		46	22	5	2	9	5	0	0	60	29
Barcelona	1968–69	La Liga	0	0	2	0	0	0	0	0	2	0
Barcelona	1969–70	La Liga	1	2	2	1	0	0	0	0	3	3
Barcelona	1970–71	La Liga	1	0	0	0	0	0	0	0	1	0
Barcelona	1971–72	La Liga	1	0	2	0	1	0	0	0	4	0
Barcelona	Total		3	2	6	1	1	0	0	0	10	3
CD Málaga	1972–73	La Liga	31	8	6	3	–		0	0	37	11
CD Málaga	1973–74	La Liga	27	3	3	0	–		0	0	30	3
CD Málaga	1974–75	La Liga	24	2	1	0	–		0	0	25	2
CD Málaga	1975–76	Segunda División	31	13	9	1	–		0	0	40	14
CD Málaga	1976–77	La Liga	13	0	3	0	–		0	0	16	0
CD Málaga	Total		126	26	22	4	0	0	0	0	148	30
Career total			175	50	33	7	10	5	0	0	218	62

=== International ===
Appearances and goals by national team and year
National team	Year	Apps	Goals
Spain	1968	1	0
Spain	1969	4	2
Total		5	2

=== International goals ===
Scores and results list Norway's goal tally first.

No	Date	Venue	Opponent	Score	Result	Competition
1.	26 March 1969	Mestalla Stadium, Valencia, Spain	Switzerland	1–0	1–0	Friendly
2.	30 April 1969	Camp Nou, Barcelona, Spain	Yugoslavia	1–0	2–1	1970 FIFA World Cup qualification
