= José Antonio Zaldúa =

Spanish footballer (1941–2018)

Personal information
- Full name: José Antonio Zaldúa Urdanavia
- Date of birth: 15 December 1941
- Place of birth: Elizondo, Spain
- Date of death: 30 June 2018 (aged 76)
- Place of death: Sant Andreu de Llavaneres, Spain
- Height: 1.73 m (5 ft 8 in)
- Position: Striker

Youth career
- 1956–1957: Baztán
- 1957–1959: Oberena
- 1959: Valladolid

Senior career*
Years	Team	Apps	(Gls)
1959–1961	Valladolid	34	(14)
1961–1971	Barcelona	217	(106)
1965	→ Osasuna (loan)	8	(2)
1971–1975	Sabadell	128	(16)
Total		387	(138)

International career
1960	Spain U18	2	(1)
1961	Spain B	1	(0)
1961–1963	Spain	3	(0)
- * Club domestic league appearances and goals

José Antonio Zaldúa Urdanavia (15 December 1941 – 30 June 2018), known as Zaldúa, was a Spanish footballer who played as a forward.

Throughout his career, Zaldúa played for Spanish clubs Real Valladolid, FC Barcelona, CA Osasuna and CE Sabadell FC. At international level, he represented the Spain national football team.

== Career ==
Born in Elizondo, he began his professional career with Valladolid, making his Primera División debut against Elche in January 17, 1960. He joined Barcelona in the summer of 1961, staying there for a decade, bar a loan to Osasuna from 1964-1965. Although he did not win any league titles, he scored 106 times in 217 games for Barcelona, including a goal in the 1969 European Cup Winners' Cup final against Slovan Bratislava, which ended in a 3-2 defeat, and 5 goals against Utrecht in the 1965–66 Inter-Cities Fairs Cup, which he later won with Barcelona. Zaldúa later joined Sabadell in 1971, keeping his football career in Catalonia until his retirement in 1975.

== International career ==
Zaldúa made one appearance for Spain's under-21 team in a 2-0 win against France, and three appearances for the senior team, the last of which in a 2-1 loss against Belgium.

== Death ==
Zaldúa died on 30 June 2018, which was soon announced by Barcelona. He died at the age of 76 of cancer in his home in Maresme, which he had resided in since retirement.
