= Ramón Alfonseda =

Spanish footballer

Personal information
- Full name: Ramón Alfonseda Pous
- Date of birth: 4 March 1948 (age 78)
- Place of birth: Granollers, Spain
- Position: Striker

Youth career
- Barcelona

Senior career*
| Years | Team | Apps | (Gls) |
| 1968–1969 | Puertollano | 22 | (7) |
| 1969–1973 | Barcelona | 54 | (7) |
| 1973–1976 | Elche | 60 | (6) |
| 1976–1977 | Levante | 24 | (7) |
| Total | | 160 | (27) |

International career
| 1968 | Spain U23 | 1 | (0) |
- * Club domestic league appearances and goals

Ramón Alfonseda Pous (born 4 March 1948) is a Spanish retired footballer. He competed in the men's tournament at the 1968 Summer Olympics.

== Honours ==
Barcelona

- Copa del Generalísimo: 1970–71
