= Eladio Silvestre =

Spanish footballer

Eladio
Personal information
- Full name: Eladio Silvestre Graells
- Date of birth: 18 November 1940 (age 85)
- Place of birth: Sabadell, Spain
- Height: 1.79 m (5 ft 10 in)
- Position: Defender

Youth career
- Mercantil
- Barcelona

Senior career*
Years	Team	Apps	(Gls)
1959–1962	Condal		
1959–1960	→ Lleida (loan)		
1962–1972	Barcelona	226	(8)
1972–1974	Hércules	66	(8)
1974–1976	Gimnàstic	17	(0)

International career
1959	Spain U18	3	(0)
1966–1970	Spain	10	(0)
- * Club domestic league appearances and goals

Eladio Silvestre Graells (born 18 November 1940 in Sabadell, Barcelona, Catalonia) is a Spanish former footballer, who played as a defender.

== Honours ==
Barcelona

- Inter-Cities Fairs Cup: 1965–1966
- Spanish Cup: 1962–63, 1967–68, 1970–71
