= Carles Rexach =

Spanish footballer (born 1947)

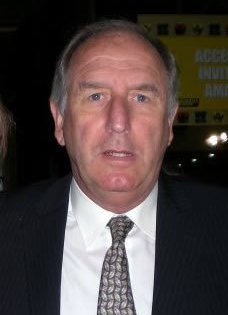
- Rexach in 2008

Personal information
- Full name: Carles Rexach Cerdà
- Date of birth: 13 January 1947 (age 79)
- Place of birth: Pedralbes, Spain
- Height: 1.82 m (5 ft 11 1/2 in)
- Position: Winger

Youth career
- 1958–1959: Rosés
- 1959–1965: Barcelona

Senior career*
Years	Team	Apps	(Gls)
1965–1981	Barcelona	328	(81)
1965–1967	→ Condal (loan)	22	(2)
Total		350	(83)

International career
1965	Spain U18	2	(0)
1966	Spain amateur	3	(0)
1967–1970	Spain U23	7	(3)
1969–1978	Spain	15	(2)

Managerial career
- 1982–1983: Catalonia (youth)
- 1983–1984: Barcelona B (assistant)
- 1984–1987: Barcelona (youth)
- 1987–1996: Barcelona (assistant)
- 1988: Barcelona (interim)
- 1991: Barcelona (interim)
- 1996: Barcelona (interim)
- 1998: Yokohama Flügels
- 2001–2002: Barcelona
- * Club domestic league appearances and goals

Carles Rexach Cerdà (Catalan pronunciation: [ˈkaɾləz rəˈʃak]; born 13 January 1947) is a Spanish former football winger and manager.

His career was mainly associated with Barcelona, spending 44 years at the club as a player (youth levels included) and coach. He formed a successful partnership with Johan Cruyff, both on and off the field, and as a player appeared in 638 games and scored 197 goals, winning the Pichichi Trophy in 1971; he totalled eight titles in both capacities, including the La Liga championship in the 1973–74 season and the 1979 Cup Winners' Cup.

Rexach appeared for Spain at the 1978 World Cup, earning 15 caps in nine years.

== Playing career ==
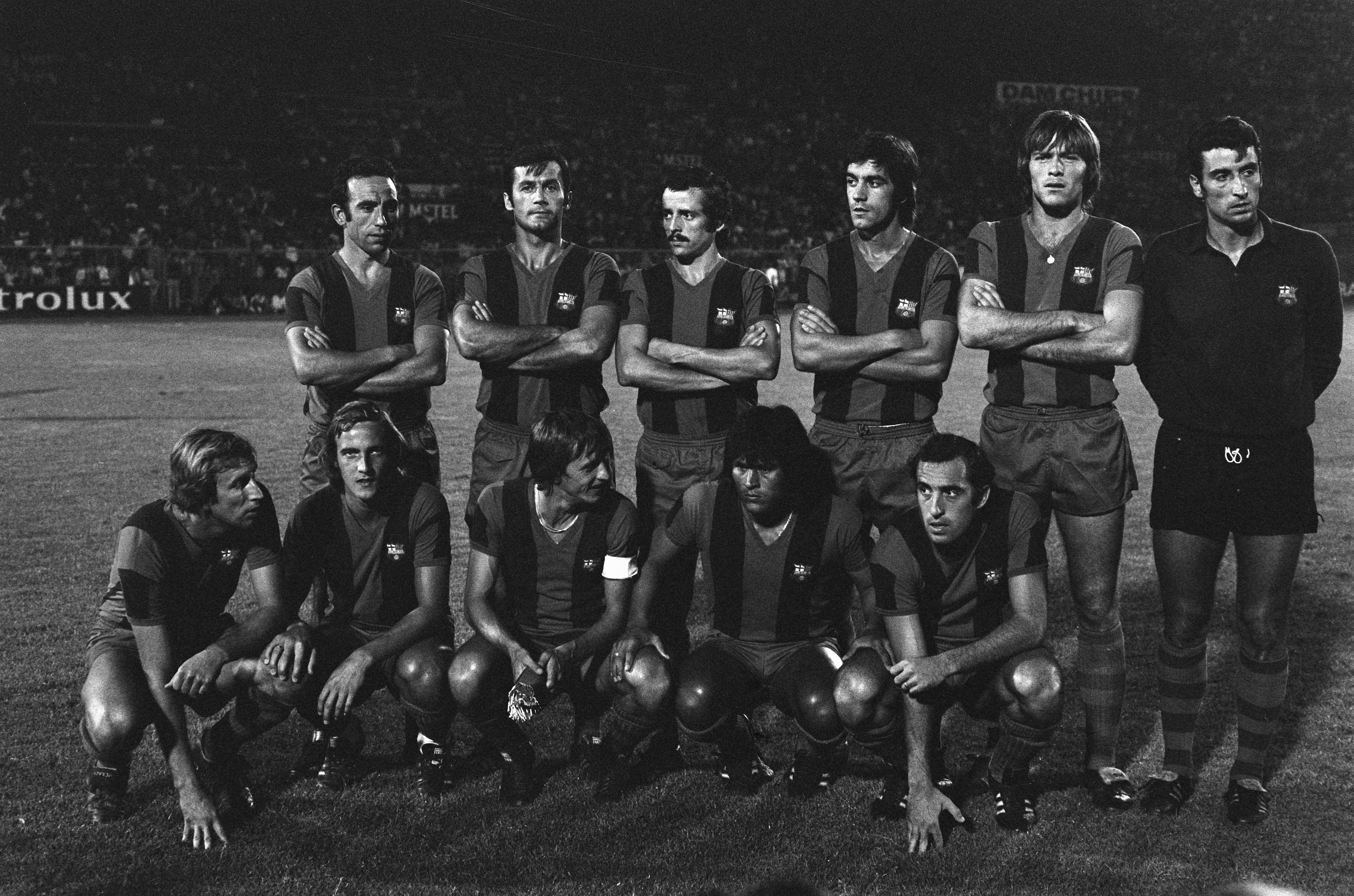
Rexach (first row, first to left) in 1975

Born in Pedralbes, Barcelona, Catalonia, Rexach made his senior debut for Barcelona on 25 April 1965 after having joined their youth system as a 12-year-old, scoring once in a 4–0 away win against Racing de Santander in the Copa del Generalísimo. His first appearance in La Liga took place on 10 September 1967, and he also found the net, but in a 3–2 away loss to Real Zaragoza. Additionally, he spent two years on loan to Condal, who acted as the farm team.

In the 1970–71 season, Rexach scored a career-best 17 goals to win the Pichichi Trophy alongside Atlético Madrid player José Eulogio Gárate. His team finished in second position with the same points as champions Valencia, adding the domestic cup.

On 5 November 1974, Rexach netted a hat-trick to help the hosts to defeat Feyenoord 3–0 in the second round of the European Cup, after three assists from longtime teammate Johan Cruyff. In the final of the 1978 Spanish Cup, he was chosen Player of the match after scoring twice in a 3–1 victory over Las Palmas; on 16 May of the following year, he contributed one goal to the 4–3 extra time defeat of Fortuna Düsseldorf in the decisive match of the UEFA Cup Winners' Cup.

Rexach retired in 1981 at the age of 34 and, on 1 September, Barcelona played a testimonial match against Argentina at the Camp Nou. He made his debut for the Spain national side on 23 April 1969, playing the second half of the 0–0 friendly draw with Mexico in Seville; selected to the 1978 FIFA World Cup squad, he featured once in an eventual group-stage exit.

== Coaching career ==
After retiring, Rexach joined the coaching staff at Barcelona B. In 1984, he co-founded the TARR football school in his native city with fellow ex-players Juan Manuel Asensi, Joaquim Rifé and Antoni Torres.

Rexach joined Luis Aragonés's staff for the 1987–88 season, and briefly became caretaker manager when the latter departed after suffering a bout of depression. When Cruyff was subsequently appointed, he remained an assistant.

When chain smoker Cruyff needed emergency heart surgery during the 1990–91 campaign, Rexach once again stepped up, leading the side to their 11th league title – his first game in charge was on 27 February 1991, in a 6–0 home win against Las Palmas in the domestic cup. He remained in the position throughout the Dream Team era and, after president Josep Lluís Nuñez sacked the Dutchman in May 1996, once again became head coach, a decision which allegedly cost him the friendship of Cruyff; after new manager Bobby Robson replaced him with José Mourinho as his assistant he became a scout, going on to be responsible for discovering Lionel Messi.

Rexach then had a brief spell in the J.League with Yokohama Flügels. After Lorenzo Serra Ferrer was sacked by Barcelona towards the end of 2000–01, he was named as his successor. In the last matchday, following a 3–2 home defeat of Valencia and courtesy of a Rivaldo 87th-minute wonder goal, they managed to qualify for the Champions League; this resulted in him being appointed coach by Joan Gaspart for the following season, but after being ousted by Real Madrid in the semi-finals of the Champions League, by Figueres in the Spanish Cup and having lost the final of the Copa Catalunya to Balaguer, he was fired and replaced by a returning Louis van Gaal, continuing to work with the club in directorial capacities.

On 8 April 2010, Rexach announced his intention to run for Barcelona's presidency, Nothing came of it eventually, but he was nonetheless chosen by new chairman Sandro Rosell as sporting advisor alongside Josep Maria Fusté and Migueli.

== Career statistics ==
Appearances and goals by club, season and competition
Club	Season	League			Copa del Rey		Europe		Total	
Club	Season	Division	Apps	Goals	Apps	Goals	Apps	Goals	Apps	Goals
Barcelona	1964–65	La Liga	0	0	2	1	0	0	2	1
Barcelona	1965–66	La Liga	0	0	3	1	0	0	3	1
Barcelona	1966–67	La Liga	0	0	0	0	0	0	0	0
Barcelona	1967–68	La Liga	22	6	2	1	1	0	25	7
Barcelona	1968–69	La Liga	14	2	2	1	5	1	21	4
Barcelona	1969–70	La Liga	26	7	6	1	5	2	37	10
Barcelona	1970–71	La Liga	29	17	9	3	4	2	42	22
Barcelona	1971–72	La Liga	26	5	4	1	5	0	35	5
Barcelona	1972–73	La Liga	27	7	3	0	2	0	32	7
Barcelona	1973–74	La Liga	28	9	7	1	0	0	35	10
Barcelona	1974–75	La Liga	31	6	1	0	7	4	39	10
Barcelona	1975–76	La Liga	32	6	6	2	8	5	46	13
Barcelona	1976–77	La Liga	14	0	0	0	5	1	19	1
Barcelona	1977–78	La Liga	22	9	6	5	7	4	35	13
Barcelona	1978–79	La Liga	24	4	1	0	7	2	32	6
Barcelona	1979–80	La Liga	24	3	2	0	5	3	31	6
Barcelona	1980–81	La Liga	9	0	5	0	2	1	15	1
Career total			328	81	59	16	63	25	450	122

== Managerial statistics ==
Team	From	To	Record				
Team	From	To	G	W	D	L	Win %
Barcelona (caretaker)	1991	1991	9	6	2	1	66.67
Barcelona (caretaker)	1996	1996	2	1	1	0	50.00
Yokohama Flügels	1998	1998	25	12	0	13	48.00
Barcelona	2001	2002	66	31	18	17	46.97
Total			102	50	21	31	49.02

== Honours ==
=== Player ===
Barcelona

- La Liga: 1973–74
- Copa del Rey: 1967–68, 1970–71, 1977–78, 1980–81
- UEFA Cup Winners' Cup: 1978–79
- Inter-Cities Fairs Cup: 1971

Individual

- Pichichi Trophy: 1970–71

=== Manager ===
Barcelona

- La Liga: 1990–91
