= Josep Maria Fusté =

Spanish footballer (1941–2023)

Personal information
- Full name: Josep Maria Fusté Blanch
- Date of birth: 15 April 1941
- Place of birth: Linyola, Spain
- Date of death: 20 April 2023 (aged 82)
- Place of death: Barcelona, Spain
- Height: 1.74 m (5 ft 9 in)
- Position: Midfielder

Youth career
- Linyola
- 1958–1960: Barcelona

Senior career*
Years	Team	Apps	(Gls)
1960–1972	Barcelona	197	(47)
1960–1962	→ Osasuna (loan)	26	(10)
1972–1973	Hércules	27	(2)
Total		250	(59)

International career
1961	Spain B	1	(0)
1964–1969	Spain	8	(3)
Medal record
Representing Spain
European Nations' Cup
Winner	1964 Spain
- * Club domestic league appearances and goals

Josep Maria Fusté Blanch (15 April 1941 – 20 April 2023) was a Spanish footballer who played as a midfielder and who was captain of FC Barcelona during the 1960s and early 1970s. In 1964, together with Luis Suárez, Amancio Amaro, José Ángel Iribar and his FC Barcelona teammate, Chus Pereda, he helped Spain win the European Championship. He also played for CA Osasuna and Hércules CF. After retiring as a player he worked as a public relations executive for Codorniu, a Catalan sparkling wine company. He also served as president of the FC Barcelona veterans association and publicly supported Sixto Cambra, a Catalan nationalist, who stood against Josep Lluís Nuñez in the 1989 FC Barcelona presidential elections.

== Club career ==
Born in Linyola, Lleida, Catalonia, Fusté first joined FC Barcelona in 1958 and then went on loan to CA Osasuna. While at Osasuna, he made his Primera División debut on 3 September 1961 and scored a penalty in a 2–2 draw with RCD Español. During his ten seasons playing for the senior team at FC Barcelona, the club finished second four times in La Liga, but were never champions. However, during the 1960s and early 1970s, they did find success in various cup competitions. In 1962 Fusté played in his first European club final when he played for FC Barcelona in the second leg of the Inter-Cities Fairs Cup final. They drew 1–1 on the night, but Barça lost 7–3 to Valencia CF on aggregate. In 1966, he played in another Fairs Cup final and this time helped FC Barcelona beat Real Zaragoza 4–3 on aggregate. In 1968, he was a member of the team that beat Real Madrid 1–0 in the final of the Copa del Generalísimo. FC Barcelona subsequently qualified for the following seasons European Cup Winners Cup and made it all the way to the final only to lose 3–2 to Slovan Bratislava.

In 1971, Fusté inspired FC Barcelona to one more Copa win. In the 1970–71 season, FC Barcelona narrowly missed out on winning La Liga, losing by a single point to Valencia CF. The two teams also met in the Copa del Generalísimo final. With Valencia CF winning 2–0, Fusté, who had come on as a substitute, scored the first of four FC Barcelona goals that eventually led to a 4–3 victory in extra-time. In 1972, after 197 La Liga games and 47 goals, Fusté left FC Barcelona and joined Hércules CF, then playing in the Segunda División.

After he retired, Fusté played with the FC Barcelona veterans team and continued to put in impressive performances until he retired in 2000. He also coached on the veteran team.

== International career ==
Fusté also played eight times for Spain, scoring three goals. José Villalonga gave him his debut on 11 March 1964 in the first-leg of the European Championship quarter-final against Republic of Ireland. He scored as Spain won 5–1 and went on to help them win the competition. He also played for Spain at the World Cup in 1966 and during the group stages of the competition he scored in the 2–1 defeat against West Germany.

== Death ==
Fusté died in Barcelona on 20 April 2023, at the age of 82.

== Career statistics ==
Scores and results list Spain's goal tally first, score column indicates score after each Fusté goal.

List of international goals scored by Josep Maria Fusté
No.	Date	Venue	Opponent	Score	Result	Competition
1	11 March 1964	Sánchez Pizjuán, Seville, Spain	Republic of Ireland	2–0	5–1	1964 European Nations' Cup qualifying
2	15 November 1964	Das Antas, Porto, Portugal	Portugal	1–0	1–2	Friendly
3	20 July 1966	Villa Park, Birmingham, United Kingdom	West Germany	1–0	1–2	1966 FIFA World Cup

== Honours ==
Barcelona

- Inter-Cities Fairs Cup: 1965–66
  - Inter-Cities Fairs Cup Trophy Play-Off 1971
- Spanish Cup: 1962–63, 1967–68, 1970–71

Spain

- European Championship: 1964
