= List of FC Barcelona records and statistics =

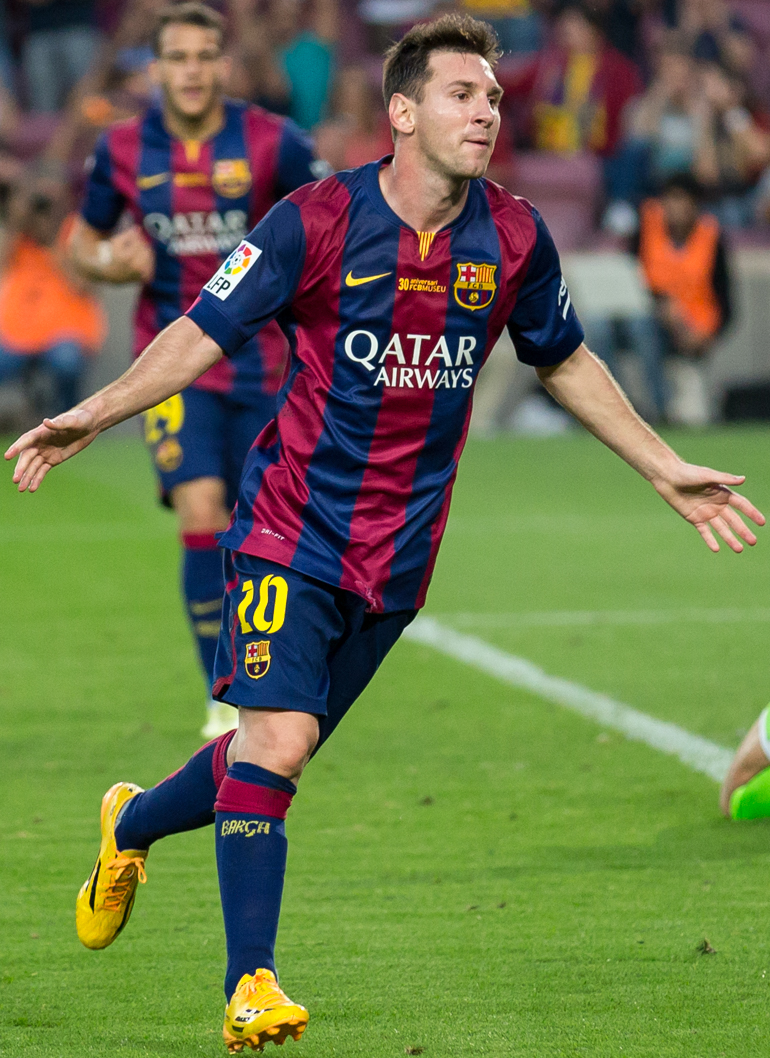
Lionel Messi is Barcelona's all-time appearance maker and all-time top scorer, with 672 goals in all competitions.

Futbol Club Barcelona is a professional association football club based in Barcelona, Catalonia, Spain. Founded by a group of footballers led by Joan Gamper, the club has become a symbol of Catalan culture and Catalanism, hence the motto "Més que un club" (More than a club). The official Barça anthem is the "Cant del Barça", written by Jaume Picas and Josep Maria Espinàs. Unlike many other football clubs, the socis, who are the members and supporters of the club, own and operate Barcelona. It is the world's second richest football club in terms of revenue, with an annual turnover of €974.8 million in the 2025–26 season.

Barcelona played its first friendly match on 8 December 1899 against the English colony in Barcelona in the old velodrome in Bonanova. Initially, Barcelona played against other local clubs in various Catalan tournaments. In 1929, the club became one of the founding members of La Liga, Spain's first national league, and has since achieved the distinction of being one of only three clubs to have never been relegated, along with Real Madrid and Athletic Bilbao. Barcelona is also the only European club to have played continental football every season since 1955. They hold a long-standing rivalry with Real Madrid, with matches between the two teams referred to as "El Clásico" (El Clàssic in Catalan). Matches against city rivals Espanyol are known as the "Derbi barceloní".

Barcelona has amassed various records in regional, domestic and continental tournaments since its founding. During the time the club played in regional competitions until the end of the Catalan championship in 1940, it won a record 23 titles from a possible 38. In 2009, Barcelona achieved an unprecedented sextuple by winning La Liga, the Copa del Rey, the UEFA Champions League, the Supercopa de España, the UEFA Super Cup and the FIFA Club World Cup in one calendar year. Additionally, Barça has won the coveted continental treble, consisting of La Liga, the Copa del Rey and the UEFA Champions League in the aforementioned 2009 and again 2015, becoming the first European club to have won the treble twice.

Barcelona has signed several high-profile players, setting the world record in transfer fees on three occasions with the purchase of Johan Cruyff from Ajax in 1973, Diego Maradona from Boca Juniors in 1982 and Ronaldo from PSV Eindhoven in 1996. The club's players have received seven FIFA World Player of the Year awards, twelve Ballon d'Or awards, three UEFA Men's Player of the Year awards and eight European Golden Shoe awards.

== Honours ==
FC Barcelona won their first trophy in 1902 when they lifted the Copa Macaya, which was the predecessor to the Catalan Championship. The club won the Catalan Championship a record 23 times during the 40-year span of the tournament.

When the national league was established in 1929, the importance of the regional league declined, and it was abandoned in 1940. From then on, Barcelona did not participate in regional competitions until the establishment of the Copa Catalunya in 1993, a cup they have won a record nine times.

They are the most successful football club in Spain, having won a total of 81 domestic titles: 29 La Liga, a record 32 Copa del Rey, a record two Copa de la Liga, a record 16 Supercopa de España and a record three Copa Eva Duarte. (Note: The Copa Eva Duarte was only recognized and organized with that name by the RFEF from 1947 until 1953, and therefore Barcelona's "Copa de Oro Argentina" win of 1945 is not included in this count.)

The club is also one of the most successful clubs in international club football, having won 22 official trophies in total, 14 of which are UEFA competitions and 8 recognised by FIFA. Barcelona has won five UEFA Champions League titles, a record four UEFA Cup Winners' Cups, a record three Inter-Cities Fairs Cups (non-UEFA), a shared record of two Latin Cups, five UEFA Super Cups and three FIFA Club World Cups. They are also second to Real Madrid in terms of overall official titles in Spain, with 103.

=== Regional titles (35) ===
- Campionat de Catalunya:

- Winners (23) (record):

- Copa Macaya (1): 1902

- Copa Barcelona (1): 1903

- Campionat de Catalunya (21): 1904–05, 1908–09, 1909–10, 1910–11, 1912–13, 1915–16, 1918–19, 1919–20, 1920–21, 1921–22, 1923–24, 1924–25, 1925–26, 1926–27, 1927–28, 1929–30, 1930–31, 1931–32, 1934–35, 1935–36, 1937–38

- Runners-up (7):

- Copa Macaya (1): 1901
- Campionat de Catalunya (6) : 1906–07, 1907–08, 1911–12, 1914–15, 1932–33, 1936–37

- Mediterranean League:

- Winners (1) (record): 1936–37

- Liga Catalana:

- Winners (1) (record): 1937–38

- Catalan Cup:

- Winners (8) (record): 1990–91, 1992–93, 1999–2000, 2003–04, 2004–05, 2006–07, 2012–13, 2013–14
- Runners-up (10): 1995–96, 1996–97, 1997–98, 2000–01, 2001–02, 2005–06, 2007–08, 2009–10, 2010–11, 2015–16

- Supercopa de Catalunya:

- Winners (2) (record): 2014, 2018
- Runners-up (2): 2016, 2019

=== Domestic titles (82) ===
- La Liga:

- Winners (29): 1929, 1944–45, 1947–48, 1948–49, 1951–52, 1952–53, 1958–59, 1959–60, 1973–74, 1984–85, 1990–91, 1991–92, 1992–93, 1993–94, 1997–98, 1998–99, 2004–05, 2005–06, 2008–09, 2009–10, 2010–11, 2012–13, 2014–15, 2015–16, 2017–18, 2018–19, 2022–23, 2024–25, 2025—26

- Runners-up (28): 1929–30, 1945–46, 1953–54, 1954–55, 1955–56, 1961–62, 1963–64, 1966–67, 1967–68, 1970–71, 1972–73, 1975–76, 1976–77, 1977–78, 1981–82, 1985–86, 1986–87, 1988–89, 1996–97, 1999–2000, 2003–04, 2006–07, 2011–12, 2013–14, 2016–17, 2019–20, 2021–22, 2023–24

- Copa del Rey:

- Winners (32) (record):

1909–10: 3–2 vs. Club Español de Madrid
1911–12: 2–0 vs. R. S. Gimnástica Española
1912–13: 2–1 vs. Real Sociedad
1919–20: 2–0 vs. Athletic Bilbao
1921–22: 5–1 vs. Real Unión
1924–25: 2–0 vs. Getxo
1925–26: 3–2 vs. Atlético Madrid
1927–28: 3–1 vs. Real Sociedad
1941–42: 4–3 vs. Athletic Bilbao
1950–51: 3–0 vs. Real Sociedad
1951–52: 4–2 vs. Valencia
1952–53: 2–1 vs. Athletic Bilbao
1956–57: 1–0 vs. Espanyol
1958–59: 4–1 vs. Granada
1962–63: 3–1 vs. Zaragoza
1967–68: 1–0 vs. Real Madrid
1970–71: 4–3 vs. Valencia
1977–78: 3–1 vs. Las Palmas
1980–81: 3–1 vs. Sporting Gijón
1982–83: 2–1 vs. Real Madrid
1987–88: 1–0 vs. Real Sociedad
1989–90: 2–0 vs. Real Madrid
1996–97: 3–2 vs. Real Betis
1997–98: 1–1 vs. Mallorca (5–4 pen.)
2008–09: 4–1 vs. Athletic Bilbao
2011–12: 3–0 vs. Athletic Bilbao
2014–15: 3–1 vs. Athletic Bilbao
2015–16: 2–0 vs. Sevilla
2016–17: 3–1 vs. Alavés
2017–18: 5–0 vs. Sevilla
2020–21: 4–0 vs. Athletic Bilbao
2024–25: 3–2 vs. Real Madrid

- Runners-up (11):

1918–19: 2–5 vs. Getxo
1931–32: 0–1 vs. Athletic Bilbao
1935–36: 1–2 vs. Real Madrid
1953–54: 0–3 vs. Valencia
1973–74: 0–4 vs. Real Madrid
1983–84: 0–1 vs. Athletic Bilbao
1985–86: 0–1 vs. Zaragoza
1995–96: 0–1 vs. Atlético Madrid
2010–11: 0–1 vs. Real Madrid
2013–14: 1–2 vs. Real Madrid
2018–19: 1–2 vs. Valencia

- Copa de la Liga:

- Winners (2) (record):

1982–83: 4–3 (2–2 / 2–1) vs. Real Madrid
1985–86: 2–1 (1–0 / 2–0) vs. Real Betis

- Supercopa de España:

- Winners (16) (record):

1983: 3–2 (3–1 / 0–1) vs. Athletic Bilbao
1991: 2–1 (0–1 / 1–1) vs. Atlético Madrid
1992: 5–2 (3–1 / 1–2) vs. Atlético Madrid
1994: 6–5 (0–2 / 4–5) vs. Zaragoza
1996: 6–5 (5–2 / 3–1) vs. Atlético Madrid
2005: 4–2 (0–3 / 1–2) vs. Real Betis
2006: 4–0 (0–1 / 3–0) vs. Espanyol
2009: 5–1 (1–2 / 3–0) vs. Athletic Bilbao
2010: 5–3 (3–1 / 4–0) vs. Sevilla
2011: 5–4 (2–2 / 3–2) vs. Real Madrid
2013: 1–1 (1–1 / 0–0) vs. Atlético Madrid
2016: 5–0 (0–2 / 3–0) vs. Sevilla
2018: 2–1 vs. Sevilla
2023: 3–1 vs. Real Madrid
2025: 5–2 vs. Real Madrid
2026: 3–2 vs. Real Madrid

- Runners-up (12):

1985: 2–3 (3–1 / 1–0) vs. Atlético Madrid
1988: 2–3 (2–0 / 2–1) vs. Real Madrid
1990: 1–5 (0–1 / 4–1) vs. Real Madrid
1993: 2–4 (3–1 / 1–1) vs. Real Madrid
1997: 3–5 (2–1 / 4–1) vs. Real Madrid
1998: 1–3 (2–1 / 0–1) vs. Mallorca
1999: 3–5 (1–0 / 3–3) vs. Valencia
2012: 4–4 (3–2 / 2–1) vs. Real Madrid
2015: 1–5 (4–0 / 1–1) vs. Athletic Bilbao
2017: 1–5 (1–3 / 0–2) vs. Real Madrid
2021: 2–3 vs. Athletic Bilbao
2024: 1–4 vs. Real Madrid

- Copa Eva Duarte: (the forerunner to the Supercopa de España)

- Winners (3) (record):

1948: 1–0 vs. Sevilla
1952: Was given without a play-off match as Barcelona won both the Spanish Cup and La Liga
1953: Was given without a play-off match as Barcelona won both the Spanish Cup and La Liga

- Runners-up (2):

1949: 4–7 vs. Valencia
1951: 0–2 vs. Atlético Madrid

=== European titles (19) ===
- UEFA Champions League:

- Winners (5):

1991–92: 1–0 vs. Sampdoria

2005–06: 2–1 vs. Arsenal

2008–09: 2–0 vs. Manchester United

2010–11: 3–1 vs. Manchester United

2014–15: 3–1 vs. Juventus

- Runners-up (3):

1960–61: 2–3 vs. Benfica

1985–86: 0–0 vs. Steaua București (0–2 on penalties)

1993–94: 0–4 vs. Milan

- UEFA Cup Winners' Cup:

- Winners (4) (record):

1978–79: 4–3 vs. Fortuna Düsseldorf

1981–82: 2–1 vs. Standard Liège

1988–89: 2–0 vs. Sampdoria

1996–97: 1–0 vs. Paris Saint-Germain

- Runners-up (2):

1968–69: 2–3 vs. Slovan Bratislava

1990–91: 1–2 vs. Manchester United

- Inter-Cities Fairs Cup: (the forerunner to the UEFA Cup)

- Winners (3) (record):

1955–58: 8–2 (2–2 / 6–0) vs. London XI

1958–60: 4–1 (0–0 / 4–1) vs. Birmingham City

1965–66: 4–3 (0–1 / 2–4) vs. Zaragoza

- Runners-up (1):

1961–62: 3–7 (6–2 / 1–1) vs. Valencia

- Inter-Cities Fairs Cup Trophy Play-Off:

1971: (2–1) vs. Leeds United

- Latin Cup:

- Winners (2) (shared record):

1949: 2–1 vs. Sporting CP

1952: 1–0 vs. Nice

- UEFA Super Cup:

- Winners (5):

1992: 3–2 (1–1 / 2–1) vs. Werder Bremen

1997: 3–1 (2–0 / 1–1) vs. Borussia Dortmund

2009: 1–0 vs. Shakhtar Donetsk

2011: 2–0 vs. Porto

2015: 5–4 vs. Sevilla

- Runners-up (4):

1979: 1–2 (1–0 / 1–1) vs. Nottingham Forest

1982: 1–3 (1–0 / 3–0) vs. Aston Villa

1989: 1–2 (1–1 / 1–0) vs. Milan

2006: 0–3 vs. Sevilla

=== Worldwide titles (3) ===
- FIFA Club World Cup:

- Winners (3):

2009: 2–1 vs. Estudiantes

2011: 4–0 vs. Santos

2015: 3–0 vs. River Plate

- Runners-up (1):

2006: 0–1 vs. Internacional

- Intercontinental Cup: (the forerunner to the FIFA Club World Cup)

- Runners-up (1):

1992: 1–2 vs. São Paulo

=== Doubles, Trebles and Sextuple ===
- Doubles

- La Liga and Copa del Rey doubles (9) (record):

1951–52, 1952–53, 1958–59, 1997–98, 2008–09 (as part of treble), 2014–15 (as part of treble), 2015–16, 2017–18, 2024–25 (as part of a domestic treble)

- La Liga and UEFA Champions League doubles (5) (shared record):

1991–92, 2005–06, 2008–09 (as part of treble), 2010–11 and 2014–15 (as part of treble)

- Copa del Rey and UEFA Cup Winners' Cup double (1):

1996–97

- Copa del Rey and Copa de la Liga double (1):

1982–83

- Trebles

- La Liga, Copa del Rey and UEFA Champions League trebles (2) (shared record):

2008–09
2014–15

- Domestic treble: La Liga, Copa del Rey and Supercopa de España (1) (shared record):

2024–25

- Sextuple

- La Liga, Copa del Rey, Supercopa de España, UEFA Champions League, UEFA Super Cup and FIFA Club World Cup sextuple (1) (shared record):

2009

=== Other titles ===
- Copa de Oro Argentina: (Unofficial event prior to the Copa Eva Duarte)

- Winners (1) (record):

1945: 5–4 vs. Athletic Bilbao

- Pyrenees Cup:

- Winners (4) (record):

1910: 2–1 vs. Real Sociedad

1911: 4–0 vs. Gars Bordeaux FC

1912: 5–3 vs. Stade Bordelais Université Club

1913: 7–2 vs. Comète Simotes Bordeaux

- Teresa Herrera Trophy

- Winners (5):

1948, 1951, 1972, 1990, 1993

- Orange Trophy:

- Winners (1):

1961

- Pequeña Copa del Mundo de Clubes:

- Winners (1):

1957

- Historical tournament (Torneo de los “históricos”):

- Winners (1) (record):

1948

- Joan Gamper Trophy:

- Winners (48) (record):

1966, 1967, 1968, 1969, 1971, 1973, 1974
1975, 1976, 1977, 1979, 1980, 1983, 1984
1985, 1986, 1988, 1990, 1991, 1992, 1995
1996, 1997, 1998, 1999, 2000, 2001, 2002
2003, 2004, 2006, 2007, 2008, 2010, 2011
2013, 2014, 2015, 2016, 2017, 2018, 2019
2020, 2021, 2022, 2023, 2025, 2026

- Copa Martini & Rossi:

- Winners (6) (record):

1948, 1949, 1950, 1952, 1952, 1953

- Mohammed V Trophy:

- Winners (1):

1969

- Ramón de Carranza Trophy:

- Winners (3):

1961, 1962, 2005

- Trofeo Ciudad De Palma:

- Winners (5):

1969, 1974, 1979, 1981, 1986

- Trofeo Costa del Sol:

- Winners (1):

1977

- Ciutat de Barcelona trophy:

- Winners (1):

1989

- Trofeo Ciudad de Alicante:

- Winners (1):

1987

- Festa d'Elx Trophy:

- Winners (3):

1970, 1989, 2003

- Trofeo Ciudad de La Línea:

- Winners (3):

1985, 1991, 1995

- Trofeo Ciudad de Oviedo:

- Winners (1):

1996

- Trofeo Ciudad de Marbella:

- Winners (1):

1993

- Ciutat de Lleida Trophy:

- Winners (1):

1998

- Amsterdam Tournament:

- Winners (1):

2000

- Memorial Artemio Franchi:

- Winners (1):

2008

- Summer of Champions' Cup:

- Winners (1):

2012

- Tournoi de Paris:

- Winners (1):

2012

- Trofeo Colombino:

- Winners (1):

2014

- Qatar Airways Cup 2016:

- Winners (1):

2016

- International Champions Cup:

- Winners (1):

2017

- Audi Cup:

- Winners (1):

2011

- LaLiga-Serie A Cup:

- Winners (1):

2019

=== Awards ===
- Laureus World Team of the Year
  - Winner: 2012
- Gazzetta Sports World Team of the Year
  - Winners: 2009, 2011, 2015
- IFFHS World Club Team of the Year
  - Winners: 1997, 2009, 2011, 2012, 2015
- Globe Soccer Best Club of the Year
  - Winners: 2011, 2015
- World Soccer Men's World Team of the Year
  - Winners: 2006, 2009, 2011, 2015
- FIFA Fair Play Award
  - Winners: 2007
- IFFHS World's Best Club of the Decade
  - Winners: 2001–2010, 2011–2020
- IFFHS World's Best Continental Club of the Century
  - 3rd Place: 1901–2000
- FIFA Club of the Century:
  - 4th Place: 1901–2000

== Players records ==
=== Most appearances ===
==== All competitions ====
As of match played 1 september
2026

Rank	Player	Nationality	Years	League	Cup	Europe	Others	Total	Ref.
1	Lionel Messi	Argentina	2004–2021	520	80	153	25	778	
2	Xavi	Spain	1998–2015	505	70	173	19	767 (Note: He played 776 games if included 8 games in the Copa Catalunya and 1 game in the Supercopa de Catalunya)	
3	Sergio Busquets	Spain	2008–2023	481	77	139	25	722 (Note: He played 723 games if included 1 game in the Copa Catalunya)	
4	Andrés Iniesta	Spain	2002–2018	442	73	138	21	674 (Note: He played 679 games if included 5 games in the Copa Catalunya)	
5	Gerard Piqué	Spain	2008–2022	397	65	133	21	616 (Note: He played 617 games if included 1 game in the Supercopa de Catalunya)	
6	Carles Puyol	Spain	1999–2014	392	58	131	12	593 (Note: He played 602 games if included 9 games in the Copa Catalunya)	
7	Migueli	Spain	1973–1988	391	60	85	13	549	
8	Víctor Valdés	Spain	2002–2014	387	12	118	18	535 (Note: He played 539 games if included 4 games in the Copa Catalunya)	
9	Jordi Alba	Spain	2012–2023	313	47	84	15	459 (Note: He played 460 games if included 1 game in the Supercopa de Catalunya)	
10	Carles Rexach	Spain	1965–1981	328	59	63	0	450	

=== Top goalscorers ===
==== All competitions ====
As of match played 16 May 2021

Rank	Player	Nationality	Years	Official goals	Total games	Ref.
1	Lionel Messi	Argentina	2004–2021	672	778	
2	César Rodríguez	Spain	1942–1955	232	351	
3	Luis Suárez	Uruguay	2014–2020	198	283	
4	László Kubala	Spain	1950–1961	194	281	
5	Josep Samitier	Spain	1919–1932	184	360	
6	Josep Escolà	Spain	1934–1949	165	236	
7	Paulino Alcántara	Philippines; Spain	1912–1916; 1918–1927	395	399	
8	Samuel Eto'o	Cameroon	2004–2009	130	199	
8	Rivaldo	Brazil	1997–2002	130	235	
10	Mariano Martín	Spain	1940–1948	129	214	

- Most goals scored for a single club in all official competitions (World Record): 672 – (Argentina) Lionel Messi, 2004–2021
- Most goals scored in El Clásico: 26 – (Argentina) Lionel Messi, 2004–2021 (Note: Does not include a goal scored in the 2017 International Champions Cup.)
- Most goals scored in Derbi barceloní: 25 – (Argentina) Lionel Messi, 2004–2021
- Most goals scored in one season in all official competitions: 73 – (Argentina) Lionel Messi, 2011–12
- Most goals scored in one calendar year (Guinness World Records): 91 (96 goals including club friendlies) – (Argentina) Lionel Messi, 2012
- Most goals scored in one game: 9 – (Switzerland) (Spain) Joan Gamper, on three occasions, 1901–1903
- Most home goals scored in one season in all competitions: 46 – (Argentina) Lionel Messi, 2011–12
- Most goals scored from a free kick in official competitions: 50 – (Argentina) Lionel Messi, 2004–2021
- Most hat-tricks in all competitions overall: 48 – (Argentina) Lionel Messi, 2004–2021
- Fastest hat-trick: 9 minutes (34th, 41st, 43rd) – (Spain) Pedro, against Getafe, 2013–14
- Most goals scored in Joan Gamper Trophy: 9 – (Argentina) Lionel Messi, 2004–2021

==== International competitions ====
As of match played 03 November 2026

Rank	Player	Nationality	Years	CL	CWC	EL	ICFC	IC	SC	FCWC	Total
1	Lionel Messi	Argentina	2004–2021	120	0	0	0	0	3	5	128
2	Rivaldo	Brazil	1997–2002	25	0	5	0	0	1	0	31
2	Luis Suárez	Uruguay	2014–2020	25	0	0	0	0	1	5	31
4	Luis Enrique	Spain	1996–2004	20	0	6	0	0	1	0	27
4	Evaristo de Macedo	Brazil	1957–1962	10	0	0	17	0	0	0	27
6	Patrick Kluivert	Netherlands	1998–2004	21	0	5	0	0	0	0	26
7	Carles Rexach	Spain	1965–1981	4	6	11	4	0	0	0	25
8	Hristo Stoichkov	Bulgaria	1990–1995; 1996–1998	15	6	0	0	1	1	1	24
8	Robert Lewandowski	Poland	2022–2026	23	0	1	0	0	0	0	24
8	Raphinha	Brazil	2022–	23	0	1	0	0	0	0	24

- Most goals scored in FIFA Club World Cup: 5 – (Argentina) Lionel Messi, 2004–2021, (Uruguay) Luis Suárez, 2014–2020
- Most goals scored in UEFA Champions League: 120 – (Argentina) Lionel Messi, 2004–2021
- Most goals scored in the group stage of UEFA Champions League (UCL Record): 71 – (Argentina) Lionel Messi, 2004–2021
- Most goals scored in UEFA Cup: 11 – (Spain) Carles Rexach, 1972–1981
- Most goals scored in UEFA Super Cup: 3 – (Argentina) Lionel Messi, 2004–2021
- Most goals scored in Intercontinental Cup: 1 – (Bulgaria) Hristo Stoichkov, 1992
- Most goals scored in UEFA Cup Winners' Cup: 10 – (Austria) Hans Krankl, 1978–1981
- Most goals scored in Inter-Cities Fairs Cup: 19 – (Spain) José Antonio Zaldúa, 1961–1971
- Most goals scored in one UEFA Champions League season: 14 – (Argentina) Lionel Messi, 2011–12
- Most goals scored in one UEFA Champions League game (UCL Record): 5 – (Argentina) Lionel Messi, against Bayer Leverkusen in 2011–12

==== La Liga ====
As of match played 16 May 2021

Rank	Player	Nationality	Years	Goals
1	Lionel Messi	Argentina	2004–2021	474
2	César Rodríguez	Spain	1942–1955	190
3	Luis Suárez	Uruguay	2014–2020	147
4	László Kubala	Hungary; Spain	1950–1961	131
5	Samuel Eto'o	Cameroon	2004–2009	108
6	Mariano Martín	Spain	1940–1948	97
7	Josep Escolà	Spain	1934–1937; 1940–1948	93
8	Patrick Kluivert	Netherlands	1998–2004	90
9	Estanislao Basora	Spain	1946–1958	89
10	Rivaldo	Brazil	1997–2002	86

- Most goals scored in La Liga: 474 (La Liga Record) – (Argentina) Lionel Messi, 2004–2021
- Most goals in one La Liga season: 50 (La Liga Record) – (Argentina) Lionel Messi, 2011–12.
- Most home goals in one La Liga season: 35 (La Liga Record) – (Argentina) Lionel Messi, 2011–12.
- Most away goals in one La Liga season: 24 (La Liga Record) – (Argentina) Lionel Messi, 2012–13.
- Most matches scored in one La Liga season: 27 (La Liga Record) – (Argentina) Lionel Messi, 2012–13.
- Most goals scored in one La Liga game: 7 (La Liga Record) – (Hungary) (Spain) László Kubala, against Sporting Gijón in 1951–52.
- Most braces in La Liga: 126 (La Liga Record) – (Argentina) Lionel Messi, 2004–2021
- Most La Liga hat-tricks in one season: 8 (La Liga Record) – (Argentina) Lionel Messi in 2011–12.
- Most La Liga hat-tricks overall: 36 (La Liga Record) – (Argentina) Lionel Messi, 2004–2021.
- Longest scoring run in La Liga: 33 goals, 21 games (La Liga Record) – (Argentina) Lionel Messi, 2012–13.
- Longest scoring run in La Liga away: 13 games (La Liga Record) – (Argentina) Lionel Messi, 2012–13.
- Most home goals scored in club history in La Liga: 278 (La Liga Record) – (Argentina) Lionel Messi, 2004–2021
- Most away goals scored in Barcelona history in La Liga: 196 (La Liga Record) – (Argentina) Lionel Messi, 2004–2021
- Most home matches scored in one La Liga season: 16 (La Liga Record) – (Argentina) Lionel Messi, 2011–12.
- Most away matches scored in one La Liga season: 15 (La Liga Record) – (Argentina) Lionel Messi, 2012–13.
- Most opponents scored in one La Liga season: 19 (La Liga Record) – (Brazil) Ronaldo, 1996–97 (42 games), (Argentina) Lionel Messi, 2012–13 (38 games).
- Most goals scored as coming on as a substitute in La Liga: 27 – (Argentina) Lionel Messi, 2004–2021
- Most assists in La Liga: 192 (La Liga Record) – (Argentina) Lionel Messi, 2004–2021

==== Copa del Rey ====
As of match played 18 April 2021

Rank	Player	Nationality	Years	Goals
1	Josep Samitier	Spain	1919–1932	65
2	Lionel Messi	Argentina	2004–2021	56
3	Laszlo Kubala	Hungary; Spain	1950–1961	49
4	César Rodríguez	Spain	1942–1955	36
5	Paulino Alcántara	Philippines; Spain	1912–1916; 1918–1927	35
6	Josep Escolà	Spain	1934–1937; 1940–1948	34
7	Eulogio Martínez	Paraguay; Spain	1956–1962	32
8	Ángel Arocha	Spain	1926–1933	29
9	Mariano Martín	Spain	1939–1948	26
10	José Antonio Zaldúa	Spain	1961–1971	25

- Most goals scored in Copa del Rey: 65 – (Spain) Josep Samitier, 1919–1932.
- Most goals scored in one Copa del Rey game: 7 – (Paraguay) (Spain) Eulogio Martínez, against Atlético Madrid in 1956–57.
- Most goals scored in one Copa del Rey season: 21 – (Spain) Josep Samitier, 1927–28.
- Most goals scored in Copa de la Liga: 4 – (Paraguay) Raúl Vicente Amarilla, 1985–86.
- Most goals scored in Supercopa de España: 14 (Supercopa de España Record) – (Argentina) Lionel Messi, 2004–2021

== Goalkeepers records ==
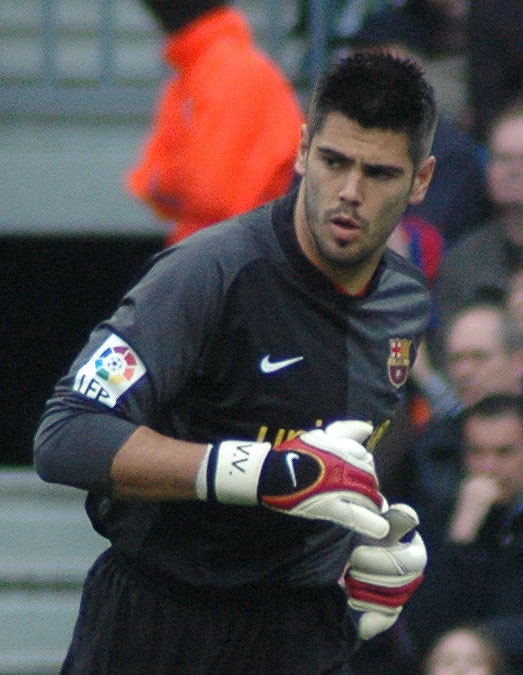
Víctor Valdés won the Zamora Trophy a record five times.

- The following Barcelona players have won the Ricardo Zamora Trophy for lowest "goals-to-games" ratio in La Liga (Antoni Ramallets and Víctor Valdés have each won the trophy a record five times for Barcelona):
  - (Spain) Juan Zambudio Velasco: (1) 1947–48
  - (Spain) Antoni Ramallets: (5) 1951–52, 1955–56, 1956–57, 1958–59, 1959–60
  - (Spain) José Manuel Pesudo: (1) 1965–66
  - (Spain) Salvador Sadurní: (3) 1968–69, 1973–74, 1974–75
  - (Spain) Miguel Reina: (1) 1972–73
  - (Spain) Pedro María Artola: (1) 1977–78
  - (Spain) Javier Urruticoechea: (1) 1983–84
  - (Spain) Andoni Zubizarreta: (1) 1986–87
  - (Spain) Víctor Valdés: (5) 2004–05, 2008–09, 2009–10, 2010–11, 2011–12
  - (Chile) Claudio Bravo: (1) 2014–15
  - (Germany) Marc-André ter Stegen: (1) 2022–23
  - (Spain) Joan Garcia: (1) 2025–26
- Longest period without conceding a goal:
  - (Spain) Víctor Valdés went 896 minutes without conceding a goal in all competitions in the 2011–12 season (from the 22nd minute of the 5th game to the 20th minute of the 12th game). Six games of the Spanish League and three Champions League games were played without conceding a goal.
  - (Spain) Miguel Reina went 824 minutes without conceding a goal in the Spanish League in the 1972–73 season (from the 53rd minute of the 14th game to the 67th minute of the 23rd game).
- Most clean sheets:
  - (Spain) Víctor Valdés played 535 official games of which he maintained a clean sheet in 237 games, or 44.3% of the matches. The former record was held by (Spain) Andoni Zubizarreta who played 410 official games of which he maintained a clean sheet in 173 games, or 42.2% of the matches.
- Most clean sheets in a season:
  - 33 in 2014–15: 23 kept by (Chile) Claudio Bravo (all in La Liga), 10 kept by (Germany) Marc-André ter Stegen 6 in Champions League and 4 in Copa del Rey.
- Most clean sheets registered by a keeper in a La Liga season:
  - 26 kept by (Germany) Marc-André ter Stegen in 2022–23.
- Goalkeeper with best average goals conceded in history:
  - (Germany) Marc-André ter Stegen in 2022–23 with an average of 0.47 goals (18 goals in 38 games).
- Best unbeaten start:
  - 754 minutes by (Chile) Claudio Bravo in 2014–15.

== Players' individual honours and awards while playing with Barcelona ==
- Barcelona players that have won the FIFA World Player of the Year/Best FIFA Men's Player:
  - (Brazil) Romário (1): 1994
  - (Brazil) Ronaldo (1): 1996
  - (Brazil) Rivaldo (1): 1999
  - (Brazil) Ronaldinho (2): 2004, 2005
  - (Argentina) Lionel Messi (2): 2009, 2019
- Barcelona players that have won the France Football Ballon d'Or or FIFA Ballon d'Or for best player in Europe/the world:
  - (Spain) Luis Suárez (1): 1960
  - (Netherlands) Johan Cruyff (2): 1973, 1974
  - (Bulgaria) Hristo Stoichkov (1): 1994
  - (Brazil) Rivaldo (1): 1999
  - (Brazil) Ronaldinho (1): 2005
  - (Argentina) Lionel Messi (6): 2009, 2010, 2011, 2012, 2015, 2019
- Barcelona players that have won the UEFA Club Footballer of the Year or UEFA Men's Player of the Year Award:
  - (Brazil) Ronaldinho (1): 2006
  - (Argentina) Lionel Messi (3): 2009, 2011, 2015
  - (Spain) Andrés Iniesta (1): 2012
- Barcelona players that have won either the Best Defender, Midfielder or Forward award at UEFA Club Football Awards:
  - (Spain) Carles Puyol (1): 2006
  - (Portugal) Deco (1): 2006
  - (Brazil) Ronaldinho (1): 2006
  - (Cameroon) Samuel Eto'o (1): 2006
  - (Spain) Xavi (1): 2009
  - (Argentina) Lionel Messi (2): 2009, 2019
  - (Netherlands) Frenkie de Jong (1): 2019
- Barcelona players that were included in the FIFPRO World 11:
  - (Argentina) Lionel Messi (15), (Spain) Andrés Iniesta (9), (Spain) Xavi (6), (Brazil) Dani Alves (6), (Spain) Gerard Piqué (4), (Brazil) Ronaldinho (3), (Spain) Carles Puyol (3), (Cameroon) Samuel Eto'o (2), (Brazil) Neymar (2), (Spain) Lamine Yamal (2), (Italy) Gianluca Zambrotta (1), (France) Lilian Thuram (1), (Spain) David Villa (1), (Uruguay) Luis Suárez (1), (Netherlands) Frenkie de Jong (1), (Spain) Pedri (1), (Spain) Pau Cubarsí (1), (Spain) Rodri (1)
- Barcelona players that were included in the UEFA Team of the Year:
  - (Argentina) Lionel Messi (12), (Spain) Andrés Iniesta (6), (Spain) Carles Puyol (6), (Spain) Xavi (5), (Spain) Gerard Piqué (5), (Brazil) Ronaldinho (3), (Brazil) Dani Alves (3), (Cameroon) Samuel Eto'o (2), (Sweden) Patrik Andersson (1), (Italy) Gianluca Zambrotta (1), (Sweden) Zlatan Ibrahimović (1), (Spain) David Villa (1), (France) Eric Abidal (1), (Brazil) Neymar (1), (Netherlands) Frenkie de Jong (1)
- Barcelona players that have received an IFFHS Men's World Team award:
  - (Argentina) Lionel Messi (5), (Spain) Lamine Yamal (2), (Brazil) Neymar (1), (Netherlands) Frenkie de Jong (1), (Spain) Pedri (1)
- Barcelona players that have won the European Golden Shoe:
  - (Brazil) Ronaldo (1996–97, 34 goals in 37 games)
  - (Argentina) Lionel Messi (2009–10, 34 goals in 35 games; 2011–12, 50 goals in 37 games; 2012–13, 46 goals in 32 games; 2016–17, 37 goals in 34 games; 2017–18, 34 goals in 35 games; 2018–19, 36 goals in 34 games)
  - (Uruguay) Luis Suárez (2015–16, 40 goals in 35 games)
- Barcelona players that have won the Pichichi Trophy:
  - (Spain) Mariano Martín (1942–43, 32 goals in 23 games)
  - (Spain) César Rodríguez (1948–49, 28 goals in 24 games)
  - (Paraguay) Cayetano Ré (1964–65, 25 goals in 30 games)
  - (Spain) Carles Rexach (1970–71, 17 goals in 28 games)
  - (Austria) Hans Krankl (1978–79, 29 goals in 30 games)
  - (Spain) Quini (1980–81, 20 goals in 30 games; 1981–82, 26 goals in 32 games)
  - (Brazil) Romário (1993–94, 30 goals in 33 games)
  - (Brazil) Ronaldo (1996–97, 34 goals in 37 games)
  - (Cameroon) Samuel Eto'o (2005–06, 26 goals in 35 games)
  - (Argentina) Lionel Messi (2009–10, 34 goals in 35 games; 2011–12, 50 goals in 37 games; 2012–13, 46 goals in 32 games; 2016–17, 37 goals in 34 games; 2017–18, 34 goals in 35 games; 2018–19, 36 goals in 34 games; 2019–20, 25 goals in 33 games; 2020–21, 30 goals in 35 games)
  - (Uruguay) Luis Suárez (2015–16, 40 goals in 35 games)
  - (Poland) Robert Lewandowski (2022–23, 23 goals in 34 games)
- Barcelona players that have been the top scorer of Copa del Rey:
  - (Brazil) Rivaldo (1997–98, 8 goals)
  - (Argentina) Javier Saviola (2006–07, 7 goals)
  - (Argentina) Lionel Messi (2008–09, 6 goals in 8 games; 2010–11, 7 goals in 6 games; 2013–14, 5 goals in 6 games; 2015–16, 5 goals in 5 games; 2016–17, 5 goals in 7 games)
  - (Brazil) Neymar (2014–15, 7 goals in 6 games)
  - (Uruguay) Luis Suárez (2015–16, 5 goals in 4 games)
  - (Spain) Munir (2015–16, 5 goals in 5 games)
  - (Spain) Ferran Torres (2024–25, 6 goals in 5 games)
- Barcelona players that have been the top scorer of UEFA Champions League:
  - (Netherlands) Ronald Koeman (1993–94, 8 goals in 12 games)
  - (Brazil) Rivaldo (1999–2000, 10 goals in 14 games)
  - (Argentina) Lionel Messi (2008–09, 9 goals in 12 games; 2009–10, 8 goals in 11 games; 2010–11, 12 goals in 13 games; 2011–12, 14 goals in 11 games; 2014–15, 10 goals in 13 games; 2018–19, 12 goals in 10 games)
  - (Brazil) Neymar (2014–15, 10 goals in 12 games)
  - (Brazil) Raphinha (2024–25, 13 goals in 14 games)
- Barcelona players that have been the top scorer of FIFA Club World Cup:
  - (Brazil) Adriano (2011, 2 goals in 1 game)
  - (Argentina) Lionel Messi (2011, 2 goals in 2 games)
  - (Uruguay) Luis Suárez (2015, 5 goals in 2 games)

=== Other individual records for the club ===
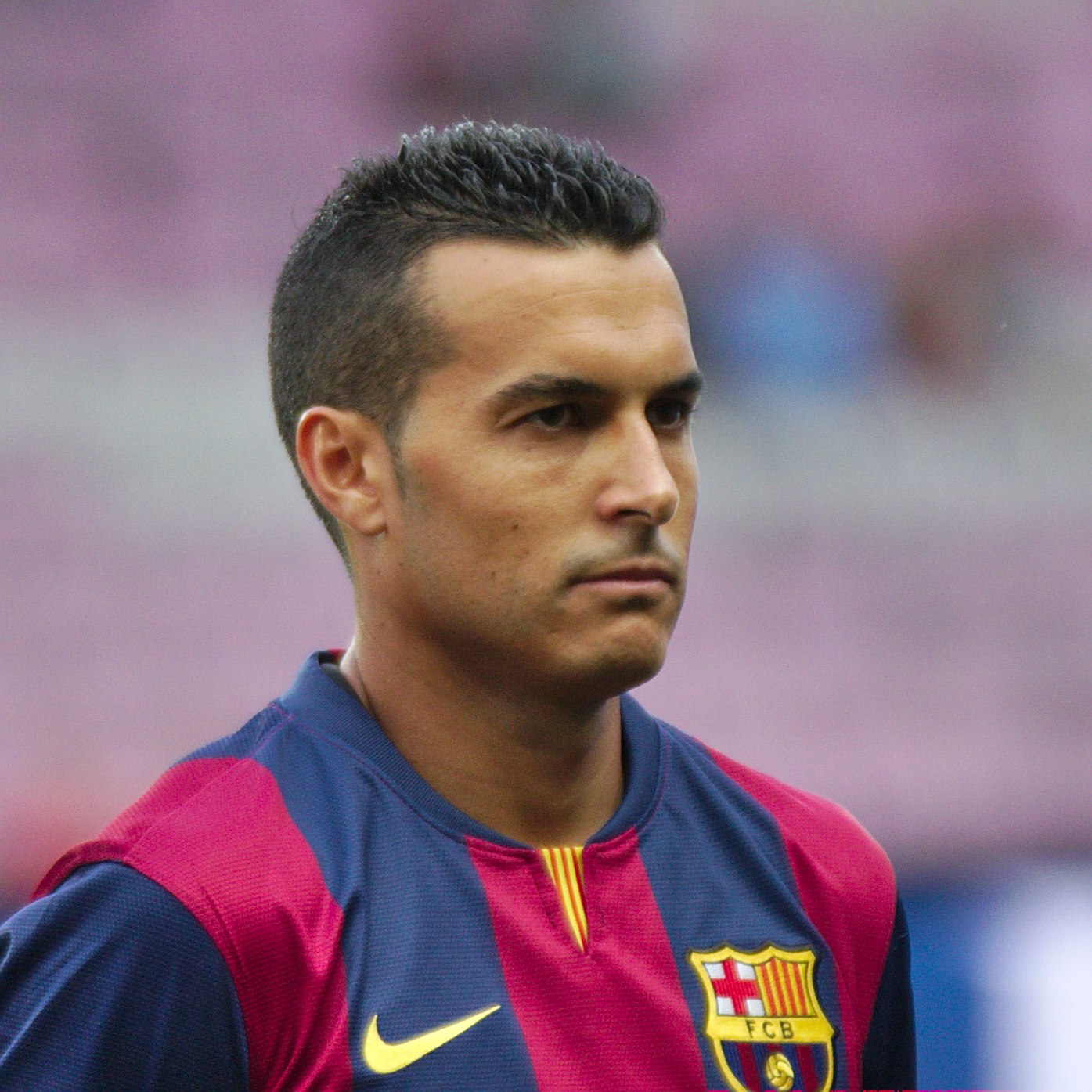
Pedro became the first player in history to score in six different competitions in one season.

- Barcelona players that have won the most trophies:
  - (Argentina) Lionel Messi (35)
- Barcelona players that have won the most Spanish League trophies:
  - (Argentina) Lionel Messi (10): 2004–05, 2005–06, 2008–09, 2009–10, 2010–11, 2012–13, 2014–15, 2015–16, 2017–18, 2018–19
- Barcelona players that have won the most Spanish Cup trophies:
  - (Argentina) Lionel Messi, (Spain) Sergio Busquets, (Spain) Gerard Piqué (7): 2008–09, 2011–12, 2014–15, 2015–16, 2016–17, 2017–18, 2020–21
- Barcelona players that have won the most UEFA Champions League trophies:
  - (Spain) Xavi, (Spain) Andrés Iniesta, (Argentina) Lionel Messi (4): 2005–06, 2008–09, 2010–11, 2014–15
- Barcelona player with most UEFA Champions League final appearances:
  - (Spain) Andrés Iniesta (4): 2006, 2009, 2011, 2015
- Players with most consecutive wins in La Liga:
  - (Spain) Sergio Busquets with 25 wins between Ligas 2009–10 and 2010–11.
- Players with most consecutive games without losing in a league game:
  - (Spain) Andrés Iniesta with 55 games (47 wins and 8 draws) from the 0–2 against Hércules in week 2 of the 2010–11 season to the 1–2 defeat against Real Madrid in week 35 of the 2011–12 season.
- Oldest player to appear for the club:
  - (Germany) Julius Müller (44/45 years).
- Youngest player to appear for the club:
  - (Spain) Armando Sagi (14 years and 200 days).
- Youngest player to score for the club:
  - (Spain) Armando Sagi (14 years and 200 days).
- Youngest player to score for the club in La Liga:
  - (Spain) Lamine Yamal (16 years and 87 days).
- Youngest player to start in the first team for the club in La Liga:
  - (Spain) Lamine Yamal (16 years and 38 days).
- Youngest player to score and assist for the club in La Liga:
  - (Spain) Ansu Fati (16 years and 318 days)(La Liga record).
- Youngest player to score for the club in Camp Nou history:
  - (Spain) Ansu Fati (16 years and 318 days).
- Youngest player to score a brace for the club in La Liga:
  - (Spain) Ansu Fati (17 years and 94 days)(La Liga record).
- Youngest player to score for the club in UEFA Champions League:
  - (Spain) Ansu Fati (17 years and 40 days)(Champions League record).
- Youngest player to score and assist for the club in UEFA Champions League:
  - (Spain) Ansu Fati (17 years and 355 days).
- Most assists provided in all official competitions (World Record): 292 – (Argentina) Lionel Messi, 2004–2021
- Player to have scored most goals as coming on as a substitute in all competitions:
  - (Argentina) Lionel Messi (34)
- Players to have scored a hat-trick in UEFA Champions League:
  - (Argentina) Lionel Messi (8) (shared record)
  - (Turkey) Arda Turan (1)
  - (Brazil) Neymar (1)
  - (Brazil) Rivaldo (1)
  - (Brazil) Ronaldinho (1)
  - (Cameroon) Samuel Eto'o (1)
  - (Poland) Robert Lewandowski (1)
  - (Brazil) Raphinha (1)
  - (Spain) Fermín López (1)
- Player to have scored in seven different official competitions in one calendar year:
  - (Argentina) Lionel Messi, 2015, in the La Liga, Copa del Rey, UEFA Champions League, Copa América, UEFA Super Cup, Spanish Super Cup and FIFA Club World Cup, completed on 20 December 2015.
- Players to have scored in six different official club competitions in one season:
  - (Spain) Pedro, 2009–10, in the Copa del Rey, La Liga, UEFA Champions League, Spanish Super Cup, UEFA Super Cup and FIFA Club World Cup, completed on 16 December 2009.
  - (Argentina) Lionel Messi, 2011–12, in the Copa del Rey, La Liga, UEFA Champions League, Spanish Super Cup, UEFA Super Cup and FIFA Club World Cup, completed on 4 January 2012 and 2015–16, in the Copa del Rey, La Liga, UEFA Champions League, Spanish Super Cup, UEFA Super Cup and FIFA Club World Cup, completed on 6 January 2015.
- Player to have both scored and assisted in six different official club competitions in one calendar year:
  - (Argentina) Lionel Messi, 2011, in the La Liga, Copa del Rey, UEFA Champions League, Spanish Super Cup, UEFA Super Cup and FIFA Club World Cup, completed on 18 December 2011.
- Most goals scored in a single season by an offensive trio in Spanish football history:
  - 131 goals, scored by (Argentina) Lionel Messi, (Brazil) Neymar and (Uruguay) Luis Suárez in 2015–16, completed on 22 May 2016.
- Most goals scored in a La Liga season by an offensive trio:
  - 90 goals, scored by (Argentina) Lionel Messi, (Brazil) Neymar and (Uruguay) Luis Suárez in 2015–16

== Managerial records ==
- First full-time manager: (England) John Barrow.
- Most seasons as coach: (England) Jack Greenwell, nine years in two spells from 1917 to 1924 and from 1931 to 1933.
- Most consecutive seasons as coach: (Netherlands) Johan Cruyff, managed the club for eight years between 1988 and 1996.
- Most matches undefeated in a La Liga season: 37 (Spain) Pep Guardiola in 2009–10 season and (Spain) Ernesto Valverde in 2017–18 season
- Most consecutive matches undefeated in a La Liga season: 36 (Spain) Ernesto Valverde, between Matchdays 1 and 34 (matchday 34 was played after matchday 36) in 2017–18 season
- Most consecutive away matches undefeated in a La Liga season: 16 (Spain) Pep Guardiola, between 29 August 2010 (Matchday 1) and 23 April 2011 (Matchday 33) in 2010–11 season
- Most consecutive away matches won in La Liga: 10 (Spain) Pep Guardiola, between 29 August 2010 (Matchday 1) and 29 January 2011 (Matchday 21) in 2010-11 season
- Most trophies won as coach: (Spain) Pep Guardiola, 14 titles out of 19 possible between August 2008 and May 2012.
- Coaches who won the treble:
  - (Spain) Pep Guardiola in 2008–09.
  - (Spain) Luis Enrique in 2014–15.

=== Coaches individual awards while coaching Barcelona ===
- Barcelona coaches that have won the FIFA World Coach of the Year award:
  - (Spain) Pep Guardiola: (1) 2011
  - (Spain) Luis Enrique: (1) 2015
- Barcelona coaches that have won the IFFHS World's Best Club Coach award:
  - (Netherlands) Frank Rijkaard: (1) 2006
  - (Spain) Pep Guardiola: (2) 2009, 2011
  - (Spain) Luis Enrique: (1) 2015

== Team records ==
Barcelona's team records include the following:

=== La Liga ===
==== Points ====
- Most points in a season:
  - 100 points in the 2012–13 season (La Liga record).
- The team with most points at the end of the first half of the league:
  - 55 points during the 2012–13 season (La Liga record).
- The team with most points at the end of the second half of the league:
  - 50 points during the 2009–10 season.
- Maximum difference over the runner up:
  - 15 points over Real Madrid in the 2012–13 season (La Liga record).

==== Goals ====
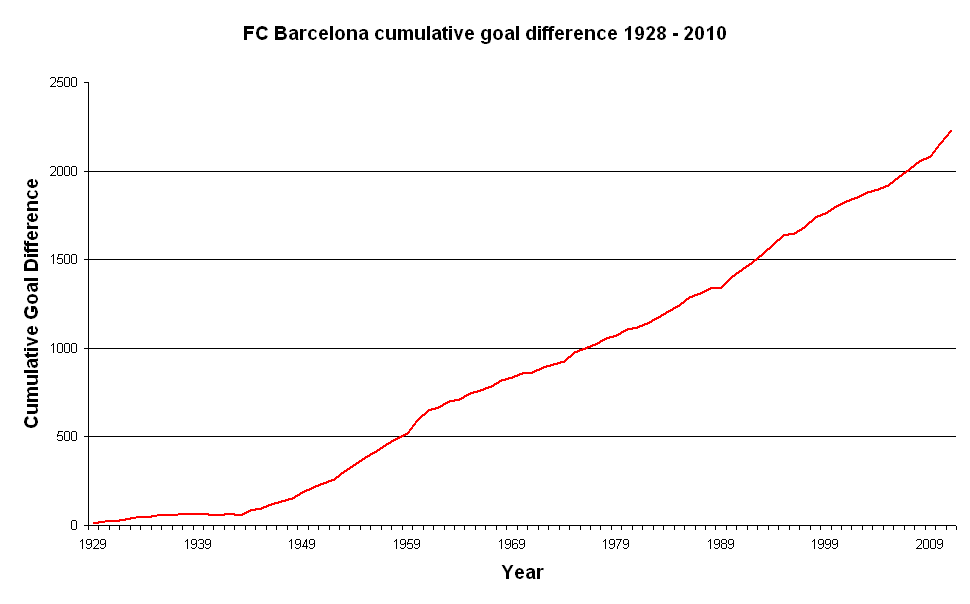
A chart showing the progress of Barcelona's cumulative goal difference in La Liga

- Most away goals scored in a League season:
  - 52 goals scored in the 2012–13 season.
- Season with the best goal difference in a League season:
  - +89 in 2014–15 season.
- Season with most goals scored in League matches:
  - In 2016–17 season, the club scored a total number of 116 goals in 38 games.
- Season with fewest goals scored in League matches:
  - The club scored a total number of 32 goals in 22 games in the 1939–40 season.
- First Spanish team to score in all away games in a La Liga season:
  - In 2010–11 season, 19 games
- Season with fewest goals conceded in League matches:
  - The club conceded a total number of 18 goals in 30 games in the 1968–69 season.
  - The club conceded a total number of 20 goals in 38 in the 2022–23 season.
- Season with most goals conceded:
  - The club conceded a total number of 66 goals in 26 games in the 1941–42 season.
- Most goals scored in a calendar year – all competitions:
  - 180 goals in 2015

==== Streaks ====
- Consecutive La Liga titles:
  - Won 4 championship titles: 1990–91, 1991–92, 1992–93, 1993–94 seasons.
- Longest consecutive unbeaten matches in La Liga (record):
  - 43 games, 2016–17 and 2017–18 season.
- Longest consecutive unbeaten matches at home in La Liga:
  - 67 games from game 25 of 1972–73 season to game 21 1976–77 season.
- Longest consecutive unbeaten matches away from home in La Liga (record):
  - 23 games (14 February 2010 to 30 April 2011)
- Longest consecutive unbeaten matches in La Liga from first game:
  - 36 first games of 2017–18 season.
- Longest winning run in La Liga (joint record):
  - 16 games in the 2010–11 season.
- Longest winning run at home in La Liga:
  - 39 games between game 22 of the 1957–58 season to game 8 of the 1960–61 season.
- Longest winning run in away matches in La Liga:
  - 12 games (1 May 2010 to 12 February 2011)
- Longest consecutive scoring in La Liga (record):
  - 72 games (4 February 2012 to 19 October 2013)
- Longest consecutive scoring at home in La Liga:
  - 88 games between game 22 of the 1951–52 season to game 18 of the 1957–58 season.
- Longest consecutive scoring in away matches in La Liga (record):
  - 26 games, from game 35 (1 May 2010) of the 2009–10 season until game 12 (6 November 2011) of the 2011–12 season.
- Most consecutive wins to start a La Liga season:
  - 9 victories in the 2026–27 season.
- Most consecutive wins and best away start in La Liga (record):
  - 10 victories in the 2010–11 season.
- Biggest home win in La Liga:
  - Won 10–1 over Gimnàstic de Tarragona in 1949–50.
- Biggest away win in La Liga (record):
  - 0–8 over Las Palmas in 1959–60.
  - 0–8 over Almería in 2010–11.
  - 0–8 over Córdoba in 2014–15.
  - 0–8 over Deportivo La Coruña in 2015–16.
- Biggest defeat in La Liga:
  - Lost 12–1 to Athletic Bilbao in 1930–31.
- Most consecutive matches as leader of La Liga:
  - 59 matchdays (from matchday 1 of the 2012–13 season to matchday 21 of the 2013–14 season).

=== International ===
- Only team to have appeared in every year of the continental competition:
  - Barcelona has participated since the inception in 1955.
- Highest win in European competitions at home games:
  - 8–0 over Apollon Limassol (Cyprus) in 1982 and 8–0 over Púchov (Slovakia) in 2003.
- Highest win in European competition at away games:
  - 0–7 over Hapoel Be'er Sheva (Israel) in the 1995–96 UEFA Cup.
- Most consecutive wins in the UEFA Champions League:
  - 11 wins during the 2002–03 season.
- Most goals in a UEFA Champions League season:
  - 45 goals during the 1999–2000 season.
- Most FIFA World Cup Golden Balls won by the players from a single club:
  - 3 – (Netherlands) Johan Cruyff won in 1974, (Brazil) Romário in 1994, and (Argentina) Lionel Messi in 2014.
- Most FIFA Club World Cup Golden Balls won by the players from a single club:
  - 4 – Deco (won in 2006), (Argentina) Lionel Messi (won in 2009 and 2011), and (Uruguay) Luis Suárez (won in 2015).
- Most FIFA/France Football Ballons d'Or won by the players from a single club:
  - 12 – (Argentina) Lionel Messi (won in 2009, 2010, 2011, 2012, 2015 and 2019), (Netherlands) Johan Cruyff (won in 1973 and 1974), (Spain) Luis Suárez (won in 1960), (Bulgaria) Hristo Stoichkov (won in 1994), (Brazil) Rivaldo (won in 1999), and (Brazil) Ronaldinho (won in 2005).
- Most European Golden Shoe awards won by the players from a single club:
  - 8 – (Brazil) Ronaldo (won in 1997), (Argentina) Lionel Messi (won in 2010, 2012, 2013, 2017, 2018 and 2019), and (Uruguay) Luis Suárez (won in 2016).
- Only team that have been represented by final three contenders at a FIFA Ballon d'Or Gala:
  - In 2010, the final three contenders were Barcelona players (Argentina) Lionel Messi, (Spain) Andrés Iniesta and (Spain) Xavi.
- Only team of which youth academy has been represented by final three contenders at a FIFA Ballon d'Or Gala:
  - In 2010, the final three contenders were Barcelona youth academy players (Argentina) Lionel Messi, (Spain) Andrés Iniesta and (Spain) Xavi.
- Only team that have collected all the awards (Golden Boot, Golden Ball, Silver Ball, Bronze Ball and Fair Play award) at a single FIFA Club World Cup:
  - In 2015, (Uruguay) Luis Suárez won the Golden Ball and the Golden Boot, (Argentina) Lionel Messi won the Silver Ball, (Spain) Andrés Iniesta won the Bronze Ball and Barcelona was awarded the Fair Play award.

=== All competitions ===
- First ever team to win the treble twice in Europe:
  - Barcelona won the Spanish Cup, Spanish League and the UEFA Champions League in 2008–09 and in 2014–15.
- Year with most titles:
  - Only Spanish football team to ever win six titles in a year and completing the sextuple by winning (in 2009): Spanish Cup, Spanish League, European Cup, Spanish Super Cup, European Super Cup and FIFA Club World Cup.
- Team with most Spanish titles: 109.
- Spanish club with most official titles: 124.
- Season with most titles (Spanish football record):
  - Five championship titles in 1951–52: La Liga, Copa del Rey, the Latin Cup, Copa Eva Duarte and Copa Martini & Rossi.
- Biggest win in any competition:
  - 18–0, in the Copa Macaya: Tarragona 0–18 Barcelona in 1901.
- Biggest win in a Friendly match:
  - 20–1, Smilde (Netherlands) 1–20 Barcelona in 1992.
- Longest unbeaten run in all competitive matches:
  - 39 games in the 2015–16 season
- Longest winning run in competitive matches:
  - 19 games in both domestic and international matches during the 2005–06 season: 13 in the league, 3 in the Champions League, 2 in the Spanish cup and 1 in the Catalan Cup.
- Most consecutive wins to start a season across all competitions:
  - 11 victories in the 2026–27 season.
- Most consecutive away wins:
  - 13 games during the 2008–09 season: 8 in the league, 3 in the Champions League and 2 in the Copa del Rey (also a Spanish football record).
- Longest scoring run in all competitions:
  - 44 games: 36 in league between game 9 (22 November 1942) of the 1942–43 season and game 18 (6 February 1944) of the 1943–44 season, and 8 Cup games in 1943.
- Longest number of seasons run scoring 100+ goals:
  - Barcelona has scored more than 100 goals in all competitions of the season for 16 seasons in a row from 2004–05 to 2020–21.
- 2nd most goals in a season – all competitions:
  - 190 in the 2011–12
- Most goals scored by players from the youth system:
  - Of the 190 goals scored in the 2011–12 season, 150 were scored by players from Barcelona's youth system (also a Spanish football record).
- Most scorers in official matches in a season:
  - In the 2010–11 season, 23 Barcelona players scored at least one goal in official competitions (also a Spanish football record).
- Most victories in a season:
  - 50 in the 2014–15 season, out of a possible 60 games (also a Spanish Football record).
- Most matches unbeaten by a Spanish team – all competitions:
  - 34 in the 2015–16 season

=== Transfer fee paid ===
Rank	Player	Nationality	From	Transfer Fee (£ millions)	Transfer Fee (€ millions)	Year	Ref.
1	Philippe Coutinho	Brazil	(England) Liverpool	£105 (Note: Initial £105 million plus reported £37 million bonuses)	€120	2018	
1	Antoine Griezmann	France	(Spain) Atlético Madrid	£107.7	€120	2019	
3	Ousmane Dembélé	France	(Germany) Borussia Dortmund	£97	€105 (Note: Initial €105 million plus reported €40 million bonuses)	2017	
4	Neymar	Brazil	(Brazil) Santos	£78	€88.2	2013	
5	Luis Suárez	Uruguay	(England) Liverpool	£75	€82.3	2014	
6	Frenkie de Jong	Netherlands	(Netherlands) Ajax	£65	€75	2019	
7	Anthony Gordon	England	(England) Newcastle United	£	€70 (Note: Initial €70 million plus reported €10 million bonuses)	2026	
8	Zlatan Ibrahimović	Sweden	(Italy) Inter Milan	£59	€69.5 (Note: Ibrahimović was transferred in a part-exchange deal worth €46 million, plus the rights to Samuel Eto'o (valued at €20M by Barcelona), and a single season loan of Alexander Hleb. Since Hleb refused to move to Inter, Barcelona had to pay a reported extra €3M to complete Ibrahimović's switch. The combined fee was thus €69M.)	2009	
9	Rodri	Spain	(England) Manchester City	£	€60 (Note: Initial €60 million plus reported €15 million bonuses)	2026	
10	Miralem Pjanić	Bosnia and Herzegovina	(Italy) Juventus	£54.8	€60 (Note: Initial €60 million plus reported €5 million bonuses)	2020	

=== Transfer fee received ===
Rank	Player	Nationality	To	Transfer Fee (£ millions)	Transfer Fee (€ millions)	Date	Ref.
1	Neymar	Brazil	(France) Paris Saint-Germain	£198	€222	2 August 2017	
2	Arthur	Brazil	(Italy) Juventus	£66	€72 (Note: Initial €72 million plus reported €10 million bonuses)	29 June 2020	
3	Luís Figo	Portugal	(Spain) Real Madrid	£37	€62	24 July 2000	
4	Ousmane Dembélé	France	(France) Paris Saint-Germain	£	€50.4	12 August 2023	
5	Ferran Torres	Spain	(France) Paris Saint-Germain	£	€48.5	15 August 2026	
6	Alexis Sánchez	Chile	(England) Arsenal	£35	€42.5	10 July 2014	
7	Paulinho	Brazil	(China) Guangzhou Evergrande	£38.4	€42	2 January 2019	
8	Malcom	Brazil	(Russia) Zenit Saint Petersburg	£36.6	€40	2 August 2019	
9	Jasper Cillessen	Netherlands	(Spain) Valencia	£31.5	€35	25 June 2019	
10	Cesc Fàbregas	Spain	(England) Chelsea	£30	€33	12 June 2014	

== See also ==
- List of FC Barcelona seasons
