= 2000–01 Arsenal F.C. season =

English football club season

Arsenal F.C.
2000–01 season
- Chairman: Peter Hill-Wood
- Manager: Arsène Wenger
- Stadium: Highbury
- Premier League: 2nd
- FA Cup: Runners-up
- League Cup: Third round
- UEFA Champions League: Quarter-finals
- Top goalscorer: League: Thierry Henry (17); All: Thierry Henry (22)
- Highest home attendance: 38,146 vs Manchester United (1 October 2000)
- Lowest home attendance: 26,105 vs Ipswich Town (10 February 2001)
- Average home league attendance: 36,764 (in all competitions)
Home colours	Away colours	Third colours

The 2000–01 season was Arsenal Football Club's ninth season in the Premier League and their 75th consecutive season in the top flight of English football. The club ended the campaign second in the Premier League, ten points behind reigning champions Manchester United. Arsenal reached the 2001 FA Cup Final at the Millennium Stadium, Cardiff in May 2001; in spite of dominating against Liverpool, they conceded two late goals, both scored by Michael Owen. In Europe, Arsenal made it to the quarter-finals of the UEFA Champions League for the first time since 1972, only to be eliminated on the away goals rule by eventual finalists Valencia.

In the transfer window, Arsenal sold Marc Overmars and Emmanuel Petit to Barcelona for a combined fee of more than £30 million. Defender Lauren was signed as a direct replacement for Nigel Winterburn, who signed on a free transfer to West Ham United. French footballers Robert Pires and Sylvain Wiltord were purchased from Marseille and Bordeaux respectively; the latter's arrival broke the club's transfer record.

Midfielder Patrick Vieira was sent off in Arsenal's first two league games of the season, though the team coped well in his absence and went unbeaten throughout September and October. Arsenal made it past the next phase of the Champions League by November, but continued to perform inconsistently in the Premier League away from home; they lost at Everton, Leeds United and Liverpool in the space of a month. A 6–1 defeat to Manchester United in February prompted Wenger to rule out their chances of winning the league. The team finished in second on 70 points, three fewer than in the previous season.

35 different players represented the club in all competitions and there were 17 different goalscorers. The club scored 99 goals in all competitions during the season. Thierry Henry was Arsenal's top goalscorer in the 2000–01 season; he scored 22 goals in 53 appearances.

== Background ==
In the 1999–2000 season, Arsenal participated in the Premier League. Despite the loss of striker Nicolas Anelka to Real Madrid, the club significantly strengthened in the summer, signing defenders Oleh Luzhnyi and Sylvinho as well as forwards Davor Šuker and Thierry Henry. Inconsistent performances in the league against lowly opposition meant Arsenal never posed a serious title challenge, ending the campaign as runners-up, 18 points behind Manchester United. The club had another poor season in the Champions League, finishing third in their group; this won them a consolation place in the UEFA Cup and Arsenal managed to go all the way to the final, where they faced Galatasaray in Copenhagen. The match ended in a 0–0 draw with few chances for either side to score; it went to penalties and Arsenal lost after Šuker and Patrick Vieira missed their spot-kicks.

=== Transfers ===
Arsenal's first signing in the transfer window was Cameroon international Lauren from Mallorca for an estimated fee of £7 million. Robert Pires moved to Arsenal in July 2000 and was later joined by Brazilian Edu; both players were transferred from Marseille and Corinthians respectively. Sylvain Wiltord joined on a club-record fee from Bordeaux, believed to be £13 million. Defenders Guy Demel, Igors Stepanovs and Sebastian Svärd were also purchased during the season, as well as forward Tomas Danilevičius, who impressed on a trial spell.

After 13 years of building his career at Arsenal, defender Nigel Winterburn moved to West Ham United on a free transfer; he was described by Wenger as a "consummate professional", who "has not only shown a remarkable amount of commitment to Arsenal but has also proven that he is an excellent footballer." Winterburn was joined by Šuker, who also signed for West Ham. Midfielders Marc Overmars and Emmanuel Petit joined Barcelona for a combined fee of £30 million. Other notable departures included Christopher Wreh to Saudi club Al-Hilal and teenage striker Jay Bothroyd to Coventry City for £1 million.

==== In ====
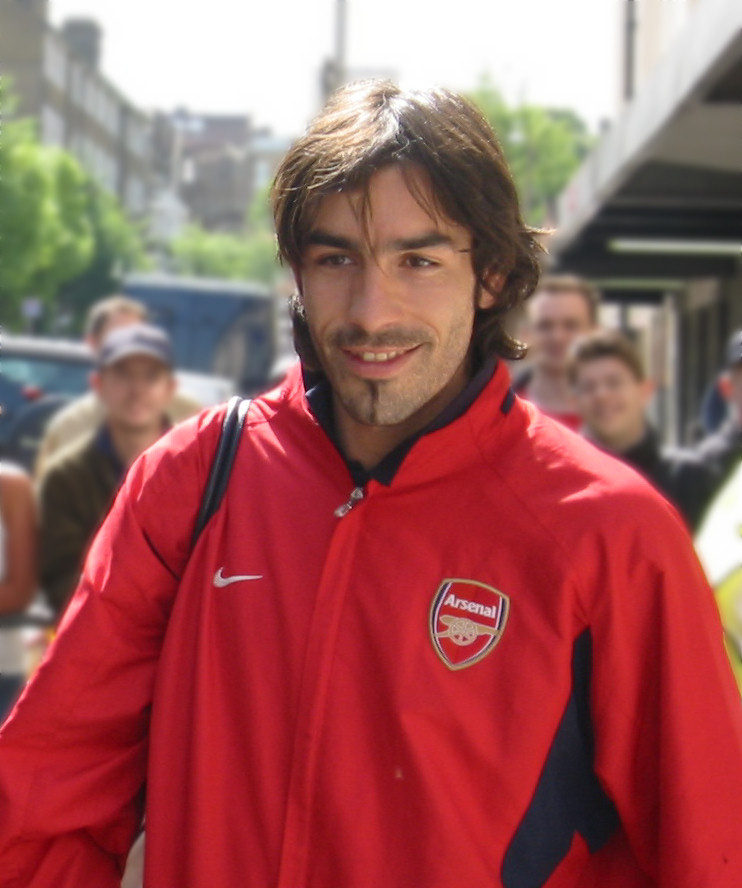
French international Robert Pires joined Arsenal in the transfer window

No.	Position	Player	Transferred from	Fee	Date	Ref
12	DF	Lauren	Mallorca	Undisclosed	30 May 2000	
7	MF	Robert Pires	Marseille	Undisclosed	3 July 2000	
17	MF	Edu	Corinthians	Undisclosed	3 July 2000	
26	MF	Guy Demel	Nîmes	Undisclosed	7 August 2000	
11	FW	Sylvain Wiltord	Bordeaux	Undisclosed	26 August 2000	
3	DF	Igors Stepanovs	Skonto Riga	Undisclosed	4 September 2000	
49	DF	Sebastian Svärd	Kjøbenhavns Boldklub	Undisclosed	27 November 2000	
9	FW	Tomas Danilevičius	Lausanne-Sport	£1,000,000	13 December 2000	

==== Out ====
No.	Position	Player	Transferred to	Fee	Date	Ref
3	DF	Nigel Winterburn	West Ham United	Free	22 June 2000	
9	FW	Davor Šuker	West Ham United	Free	28 June 2000	
34	FW	Jay Bothroyd	Coventry City	£1,000,000	11 July 2000	
33	MF	Tommy Black	Crystal Palace	£500,000	12 July 2000	
38	MF	Julian Gray	Crystal Palace	£500,000	12 July 2000	
11	MF	Marc Overmars	Barcelona	£25,000,000	28 July 2000	
17	MF	Emmanuel Petit	Barcelona	£7,000,000	28 July 2000	
36	DF	Brian McGovern	Norwich City	Undisclosed	23 August 2000	
32	DF	Rhys Weston	Cardiff City	£50,000	15 November 2000	
30	DF	Paolo Vernazza	Watford	£350,000	15 December 2000	
12	FW	Christopher Wreh	Al-Hilal	Undisclosed	15 December 2000	
43	MF	James Harper	Reading	Free	2 March 2001	

== Pre-season ==
To prepare for the upcoming season Arsenal took part in several pre-season friendlies, both with local, and international teams including Barcelona and Ajax in the Amsterdam Tournament. They first played Boreham Wood on 14 July, ending in a surprising, but disappointing 1–1 draw. They won against Barnet on 22 July, before heading abroad to play Mainz 05 on 30 July in a 2–0 victory. Arsenal also took part in the 2000 Amsterdam Tournament, taking place from 3 to 5 August, however losing both games to Barcelona and Ajax, eventually finishing bottom of the group. The end of their pre-season ended on a more positive note with victories against both Dunfermline Athletic, and a 7–0 thrashing of Stevenage for their last game of the pre-season on 12 August.

=== Match details ===
14 July 2000 Friendly	Boreham Wood	1-1	Arsenal	Borehamwood
	Selby	Report	Lauren	Stadium: Meadow Park

22 July 2000 Friendly	Barnet	0-1	Arsenal	London
		Report	Pennant	Stadium: Underhill Stadium; Attendance: 3,938

30 July 2000 Friendly	Mainz 05	0-2	Arsenal	Mainz, Germany
			Lauren; Kanu	Stadium: Bruchwegstadion; Attendance: 4,533

9 August 2000 Friendly	Dunfermline Athletic	0-3	Arsenal	Dunfermline, Scotland
		Report	Henry; Ljungberg; Kanu	Stadium: East End Park

12 August 2000 Friendly	Stevenage	0-7	Arsenal	Stevenage
			Henry; Bergkamp; Parlour; Kanu	Stadium: Broadhall Way

==== Amsterdam tournament ====
Arsenal joined Barcelona and Lazio taking part in the annual Amsterdam tournament, hosted by Ajax at their home stadium. Within this tournament, each team plays two games where 3 points is given for a win, 1 point for a draw, and 0 for a loss. However an additional point is also granted for every goal scored.

3 August 2000 Amsterdam Tournament	FC Barcelona	2-1	Arsenal	Amsterdam, Netherlands
	Guardiola 3' (pen.); Cocu 39'	Report	Danilevicius 33'	Stadium: Amsterdam Arena; Attendance: 50,000

5 August 2000 Amsterdam Tournament	Ajax	2-0	Arsenal	Amsterdam, Netherlands
	Arveladze 38'; Hosé 89'	Report		Stadium: Amsterdam Arena; Attendance: 51,000

===== Results =====
With 2 losses and just 1 goal scored, Arsenal finished bottom of the table. Barcelona and Ajax finished with a draw and a win each, but with Barcelona storming the top of the table with 5 goals, they won the overall competition.

Team	Pld	W	D	L	GF	GA	GD	Pts
(Spain) Barcelona	2	1	1	0	5	4	+1	9
(Netherlands) Ajax	2	1	1	0	2	0	+2	6
(Italy) Lazio	2	0	2	0	3	3	0	5
(England) Arsenal	2	0	0	2	1	4	−3	1

Source: RSSSF
Rules for classification: An extra point is awarded for each goal scored.

== Premier League ==
=== August–October ===
Arsenal opened the league season away to Sunderland on 19 August 2000. A second-half header from Niall Quinn was enough to earn the home team victory, in a match where Arsenal wasted numerous chances to equalise. Patrick Vieira was sent off for swiping his forearm at defender Darren Williams in injury time and Wenger was involved in an altercation with fourth official Paul Taylor in the stadium tunnel. He was later charged with "alleged threatening behaviour and physical intimidation" and found guilty by a FA disciplinary commission. (Note: Wenger was initially given a 12-match touchline ban and a fine of four weeks' salary. He successfully appealed but was reprimanded and fined £10,000 for his actions.) Right back Lauren scored on his debut for Arsenal against Liverpool two days after; Vieira was dismissed off the pitch for the second successive game, with Liverpool being reduced to nine men when midfielders Gary McAllister and Dietmar Hamann were also shown red cards. In Vieira's final match before his five-match suspension, he scored two goals against Charlton Athletic at Highbury in a 5–3 win. Arsenal earned a point away to Chelsea in the first week of September and drew 1–1 against Bradford City. Although the team beat Coventry City 2–1, they needed a late goal scored by Dennis Bergkamp to draw away against promoted Ipswich Town.

A "spectacular" goal by Henry against Manchester United on 1 October 2000 inflicted the champions their first league defeat of the season. The Frenchman scored after receiving a pass from Gilles Grimandi in the 30th minute; with his back to goal he flicked the ball up before pivoting to strike the ball over goalkeeper Fabian Barthez. Henry scored the winning goal against Aston Villa the following week and a further league victory, away at West Ham United moved Arsenal level on points with Manchester United. The month ended with a 5–0 win against Manchester City.

=== November–February ===
A penalty scored by Henry against Middlesbrough ensured a fifth successive league win for Arsenal. They were held to a stalemate against Derby County; this was followed by defeat at Goodison Park away to Everton in which Wenger called the team performance as "not acceptable". Arsenal lost their second consecutive league match against Leeds United when a deflected Olivier Dacourt free-kick went past goalkeeper Alex Manninger and into his net. A win against Southampton came before a 5–0 victory at home to Newcastle United where Ray Parlour scored a hat-trick.

"We are not in March yet and the season is already over. I cannot be very proud of that. This hurts."

— Arsène Wenger after Arsenal's defeat to Manchester United, February 2001

The Christmas period began with a 1–1 draw against local rivals Tottenham Hotspur. A 4–0 defeat away to Liverpool concerned Wenger, who noted a lack of goals being problematic: "It has been our problem all season. We so very rarely score two in a match, and that makes life very difficult." Henry scored a hat-trick in a 6–1 win at home to Leicester City on Boxing Day. A draw against Sunderland, having been 2–0 up at half time meant Arsenal ended the calendar year in second place, eight points behind Manchester United.

Charlton Athletic recorded their first victory over Arsenal in 44 years, on New Year's Day; Jonatan Johansson scored the winning goal in the first half. Back-to-back draws, first at Chelsea and then Leicester City, preceded a 2–0 win against Bradford City. Bergkamp scored the winning goal at Coventry City; it was the club's first away win since November. A 1–0 victory at home to Ipswich Town on 10 February 2001 moved the club five points clear of Liverpool.

Arsenal faced Manchester United at Old Trafford, needing a win to realistically have a chance of winning the league. Striker Dwight Yorke scored in the second minute for the home team, before Henry equalised. They conceded within 60 seconds, when Igors Stepanovs played Yorke onside to put the ball past Seaman. He completed his hat-trick, before Roy Keane, Ole Gunnar Solskjær and Teddy Sheringham each scored to compound a 6–1 loss – Arsenal's biggest defeat in the Premier League. Wenger rued the performance, saying "...we were very naive and gave too much freedom to United. No one communicated."

=== March–May ===
Wiltord scored a hat-trick in Arsenal's 3–0 win over West Ham United on 3 March 2001. A scoreless draw at Aston Villa was followed with a 2–0 win against Tottenham Hotspur; both clubs observed a minute's silence before the game, in honour of former Arsenal midfielder David Rocastle, who died at age 33. Arsenal rested several first-teamers for the trip to Manchester City and won the match 4–0. However, defeat to Middlesbrough three days after handed the league championship to Manchester United, for the third consecutive season. Wenger refuted criticism over the team's league performance, and said, "It's not just Arsenal's responsibility to push Manchester United. There are 10 to 15 teams with the potential quality of Arsenal."

Following their exit in the Champions League in midweek, Arsenal beat Everton 4–1 on 21 April 2001. They moved four points clear in second with a further win, this time away at Derby County. Wiltord scored the winning goal against Leeds United to secure a Champions League place for Arsenal; a draw against Newcastle United confirmed the club as runners-up for the third season running. Arsenal ended their league campaign against Southampton, in the final match played at The Dell. With the score 2–2 in the 89th minute, striker Matthew Le Tissier volleyed the ball from inside the penalty box and over goalkeeper Alex Manninger, to win the match for the home team.

=== Match details ===
19 August 2000 1	Sunderland	1–0	Arsenal	Sunderland
	Quinn 53'	Report		Stadium: Stadium of Light; Attendance: 46,347; Referee: Steve Dunn

21 August 2000 2	Arsenal	2–0	Liverpool	London
	Lauren 8'; Henry 89'	Report		Stadium: Highbury; Attendance: 38,014; Referee: Graham Poll

26 August 2000 3	Arsenal	5–3	Charlton Athletic	London
	Vieira 19', 61'; Henry 46', 67'; Sylvinho 89'	Report	24', 30' Hunt; 58' Stuart	Stadium: Highbury; Attendance: 38,025; Referee: Stephen Lodge

6 September 2000 4	Chelsea	2–2	Arsenal	London
	Hasselbaink 31'; Zola 58'	Report	76' Henry; 86' Sylvinho	Stadium: Stamford Bridge; Attendance: 34,923; Referee: Mike Riley

9 September 2000 5	Bradford City	1–1	Arsenal	Bradford
	McCall 10'	Report	66' Cole	Stadium: Valley Parade; Attendance: 17,160; Referee: Alan Wiley

16 September 2000 6	Arsenal	2–1	Coventry City	London
	Wiltord 24'; Vernazza 72'	Report	80' Hadji	Stadium: Highbury; Attendance: 37,794; Referee: Mike Dean

23 September 2000 7	Ipswich Town	1–1	Arsenal	Ipswich
	Stewart 49'	Report	84' Bergkamp	Stadium: Portman Road; Attendance: 22,030; Referee: Paul Durkin

1 October 2000 8	Arsenal	1–0	Manchester United	London
	Henry 30'	Report		Stadium: Highbury; Attendance: 38,146; Referee: Graham Barber

14 October 2000 9	Arsenal	1–0	Aston Villa	London
	Henry 61'	Report		Stadium: Highbury; Attendance: 38,042; Referee: Rob Harris

21 October 2000 10	West Ham United	1–2	Arsenal	London
	Pearce 56'	Report	12' Pires; 21' (o.g.) Ferdinand	Stadium: Boleyn Ground; Attendance: 26,034; Referee: Dermot Gallagher

28 October 2000 11	Arsenal	5–0	Manchester City	London
	Cole 44'; Bergkamp 52'; Wiltord 75'; Henry 82', 88'	Report		Stadium: Highbury; Attendance: 38,049; Referee: Rob Styles

4 November 2000 12	Middlesbrough	0–1	Arsenal	Middlesbrough
		Report	25' (pen.) Henry	Stadium: Riverside Stadium; Attendance: 29,541; Referee: Andy D'Urso

11 November 2000 13	Arsenal	0–0	Derby County	London
		Report		Stadium: Highbury; Attendance: 37,679; Referee: Stephen Lodge

18 November 2000 14	Everton	2–0	Arsenal	Liverpool
	Cadamarteri 54'; K. Campbell 73'	Report		Stadium: Goodison Park; Attendance: 33,106; Referee: Mike Riley

26 November 2000 15	Leeds United	1–0	Arsenal	Leeds
	Dacourt 56'	Report		Stadium: Elland Road; Attendance: 38,084; Referee: Dermot Gallagher

2 December 2000 16	Arsenal	1–0	Southampton	London
	Lundekvam 85' (o.g.)	Report		Stadium: Highbury; Attendance: 38,036; Referee: Steve Dunn

9 December 2000 17	Arsenal	5–0	Newcastle United	London
	Henry 13'; Parlour 16', 86', 90+3'; Kanu 52'	Report		Stadium: Highbury; Attendance: 38,052; Referee: Mike Dean

18 December 2000 18	Tottenham Hotspur	1–1	Arsenal	London
	Rebrov 31'	Report	89' Vieira	Stadium: White Hart Lane; Attendance: 36,062; Referee: Jeff Winter

23 December 2000 19	Liverpool	4–0	Arsenal	Liverpool
	Gerrard 11'; Owen 62'; Barmby 71'; Fowler 90+1'	Report		Stadium: Anfield; Attendance: 44,144; Referee: Paul Durkin

26 December 2000 20	Arsenal	6–1	Leicester City	London
	Henry 35', 66', 82'; Vieira 50'; Ljungberg 75'; Adams 90'	Report	54' Akinbiyi	Stadium: Highbury; Attendance: 38,007; Referee: Dermot Gallagher

30 December 2000 21	Arsenal	2–2	Sunderland	London
	Vieira 5'; Dixon 40'	Report	53' (pen.) Phillips; 83' McCann	Stadium: Highbury; Attendance: 38,026; Referee: Graham Barber

1 January 2001 22	Charlton Athletic	1–0	Arsenal	London
	Johansson 39'	Report		Stadium: The Valley; Attendance: 20,043; Referee: Graham Poll

13 January 2001 23	Arsenal	1–1	Chelsea	London
	Pires 3'	Report	62' Terry	Stadium: Highbury; Attendance: 38,071; Referee: David Elleray

20 January 2001 24	Leicester City	0–0	Arsenal	Leicester
		Report		Stadium: Filbert Street; Attendance: 21,872; Referee: Barry Knight

30 January 2001 25	Arsenal	2–0	Bradford City	London
	Parlour 17'; Lauren 26'	Report		Stadium: Highbury; Attendance: 37,318; Referee: Clive Wilkes

3 February 2001 26	Coventry City	0–1	Arsenal	Coventry
		Report	Bergkamp 78'	Stadium: Highfield Road; Attendance: 22,035; Referee: Mike Dean

10 February 2001 27	Arsenal	1–0	Ipswich Town	London
	Henry 67'	Report		Stadium: Highbury; Attendance: 38,011; Referee: Rob Harris

25 February 2001 28	Manchester United	6–1	Arsenal	Manchester
	Yorke 3', 18', 22'; Keane 26'; Solskjær 38'; Sheringham 90+1'	Report	Henry 16'	Stadium: Old Trafford; Attendance: 67,535; Referee: Paul Durkin

3 March 2001 29	Arsenal	3–0	West Ham United	London
	Wiltord 6', 13', 39'	Report		Stadium: Highbury; Attendance: 38,071; Referee: Mike Riley (referee)

18 March 2001 30	Aston Villa	0–0	Arsenal	Birmingham
		Report		Stadium: Villa Park; Attendance: 36,111; Referee: Barry Knight

31 March 2001 31	Arsenal	2–0	Tottenham Hotspur	London
	Pires 70'; Henry 87'	Report		Stadium: Highbury; Attendance: 38,121; Referee: Paul Durkin

11 April 2001 32	Manchester City	0–4	Arsenal	Manchester
		Report	8', 16' Ljungberg; 8' Wiltord; 36' Kanu	Stadium: Maine Road; Attendance: 33,444; Referee: Neale Barry

14 April 2001 33	Arsenal	0–3	Middlesbrough	London
		Report	34' (o.g.) Edu; 38' (o.g.) Sylvinho; 58' Ricard	Stadium: Highbury; Attendance: 37,879; Referee: Paul Durkin

21 April 2001 34	Arsenal	4–1	Everton	London
	Ljungberg 21'; Grimandi 55'; Wiltord 67'; Henry 87'	Report	24' K. Campbell	Stadium: Highbury; Attendance: 38,029; Referee: Dermot Gallagher

28 April 2001 35	Derby County	1–2	Arsenal	Derby
	Eranio 45+2'	Report	21' Kanu; 80' Pires	Stadium: Pride Park Stadium; Attendance: 29,567; Referee: Graham Barber

5 May 2001 36	Arsenal	2–1	Leeds United	London
	Ljungberg 17'; Wiltord 56'	Report	58' Harte	Stadium: Highbury; Attendance: 38,142; Referee: Peter Jones

15 May 2001 37	Newcastle United	0–0	Arsenal	Newcastle upon Tyne
		Report		Stadium: St James' Park; Attendance: 50,729; Referee: Alan Wiley

19 May 2001 38	Southampton	3–2	Arsenal	Southampton
	Kachloul 46', 61'; Le Tissier 89'	Report	28' Cole; 54' Ljungberg	Stadium: The Dell, Southampton; Attendance: 15,252; Referee: Paul Taylor

=== Classification ===
Pos	Team	Pld	W	D	L	GF	GA	GD	Pts	Qualification or relegation
1	Manchester United (C)	38	24	8	6	79	31	+48	80	Qualification for the Champions League first group stage
2	Arsenal	38	20	10	8	63	38	+25	70	Qualification for the Champions League first group stage
3	Liverpool	38	20	9	9	71	39	+32	69	Qualification for the Champions League third qualifying round (Note: Since Liverpool won the League Cup and qualified for the Champions League, their UEFA Cup place went to fifth-placed Ipswich Town. Since both FA Cup finalists, Liverpool and Arsenal, qualified for the Champions League, the berth in the UEFA Cup went to sixth-placed Chelsea. Both Ipswich and Chelsea were the highest-ranked team not already qualified for a European competition.)
4	Leeds United	38	20	8	10	64	43	+21	68	Qualification for the UEFA Cup first round
5	Ipswich Town	38	20	6	12	57	42	+15	66	Qualification for the UEFA Cup first round

Source: Premier League
Rules for classification: 1) points; 2) goal difference; 3) number of goals scored.
(C) Champions

==== Results summary ====
Overall								Home						Away					
Pld	W	D	L	GF	GA	GD	Pts	W	D	L	GF	GA	GD	W	D	L	GF	GA	GD
38	20	10	8	63	38	+25	70	15	3	1	45	13	+32	5	7	7	18	25	−7

==== Results by round ====
Round	1	2	3	4	5	6	7	8	9	10	11	12	13	14	15	16	17	18	19	20	21	22	23	24	25	26	27	28	29	30	31	32	33	34	35	36	37	38
Ground	A	H	H	A	A	H	A	H	H	A	H	A	H	A	A	H	H	A	A	H	H	A	H	A	H	A	H	A	H	A	H	A	H	H	A	H	A	A
Result	L	W	W	D	D	W	D	W	W	W	W	W	D	L	L	W	W	D	L	W	D	L	D	D	W	W	W	L	W	D	W	W	L	W	W	W	D	L
Position	14	7	1	4	5	2	3	3	2	2	2	2	2	2	2	2	2	2	2	2	2	3	3	2	2	2	2	2	2	2	2	2	2	2	2	2	2	2

A = Away; H = Home; W = Win; D = Draw; L = Loss

== FA Cup ==
Arsenal entered the FA Cup in the third round, receiving a bye as a Premier League club. Their opening match was a 1–0 victory against Carlisle United; Wiltord scored the winning goal in the 22nd minute. At Loftus Road, a 6–0 away win at Queens Park Rangers in the fourth round represented Wenger's "best win as Arsenal manager" and the club's best away win in the FA Cup for 64 years. Wiltord, who started the match against Chelsea as a substitute, came off the bench to score twice in the second half and sent Arsenal into the quarter-finals, where they enjoyed a comfortable win against Blackburn Rovers of the First Division. Arsenal was drawn against Tottenham Hotspur in the semi-final and it was their rivals who had taken the lead in the 14th minute. Vieira equalised before several players – "Pires, Parlour and Wiltord continued to squander chances". With 17 minutes remaining in the match, Pires scored via a tap-in to secure Arsenal's passage into the final.

=== Final ===
In the final against Liverpool, played at the Millennium Stadium in Cardiff, Arsenal began the brighter of the two teams, before being denied two penalty shouts – one involving Stéphane Henchoz, who cleared Henry's shot with his hand. In the 72nd minute, Arsenal took a "deserved" lead, when Pires played Ljungberg clean through to round goalkeeper Sander Westerveld and shoot. Liverpool equalised nine minutes after, through a Gary McAllister free-kick, which was not cleared properly by Arsenal; Michael Owen "waited for the loose ball to come down before drilling a rebound into Seaman's bottom right corner". Owen scored in the 88th minute, outpacing both Adams and Dixon to shoot the ball into the bottom right corner of the goalnet. The defeat prompted Wenger to admit new players would be brought in during the transfer window.

6 January 2001 Third round	Carlisle United	0–1	Arsenal	Carlisle
		Report	Wiltord 22'	Stadium: Brunton Park; Attendance: 15,300; Referee: Stephen Lodge

27 January 2001 Fourth round	Queens Park Rangers	0–6	Arsenal	London
		Report	Plummer 32' (o.g.); Wiltord 33', 56'; Rose 49' (o.g.); Pires 58'; Bergkamp 74'	Stadium: Loftus Road; Attendance: 19,003; Referee: Neale Barry

18 February 2001 Fifth round	Arsenal	3–1	Chelsea	London
	Henry 52' (pen.); Wiltord 74', 85'	Report	Hasselbaink 62'	Stadium: Highbury; Attendance: 38,096; Referee: Graham Barber

10 March 2001 Quarter-finals	Arsenal	3–0	Blackburn Rovers	London
	Wiltord 2'; Adams 5'; Pires 36'	Report		Stadium: Highbury; Attendance: 36,304; Referee: Jeff Winter

8 April 2001 Semi-finals	Arsenal	2–1	Tottenham Hotspur	Manchester
	Vieira 33'; Pires 74'	Report	Doherty 14'	Stadium: Old Trafford; Attendance: 63,541; Referee: Graham Poll

12 May 2001 Final	Arsenal	1–2	Liverpool	Cardiff
	Ljungberg 72'	Report	Owen 83', 88'	Stadium: Millennium Stadium; Attendance: 72,500; Referee: Steve Dunn

== Football League Cup ==
Together, with the other clubs playing in European football, Arsenal entered the Football League Cup in the third round, where they were drawn at home to fellow Premier League club Ipswich Town. Despite dominating territorial advantage, the Arsenal team were beaten 2–1 – the winning goal scored late by substitute James Scowcroft.

1 November 2000 Third round	Arsenal	1–2	Ipswich Town	London
	Stepanovs 44'	Report	Clapham 2'; Scowcroft 89'	Stadium: Highbury; Attendance: 26,105; Referee: Jeff Winter

== UEFA Champions League ==
=== First group stage ===
Arsenal won their first three matches in Group B, against Sparta Prague, Shakhtar Donetsk and Lazio. The club secured qualification into the second group stage with a 1–1 draw away at Lazio, before a win against Sparta Prague and defeat to Shakhtar Donetsk to end the first group stage with 13 points. Arsenal finished top of Group B due to a better head-to-head record.

Pos	Team	Pld	W	D	L	GF	GA	GD	Pts	Qualification
1	(England) Arsenal	6	4	1	1	11	8	+3	13	Advance to second group stage
2	(Italy) Lazio	6	4	1	1	13	4	+9	13	Advance to second group stage
3	(Ukraine) Shakhtar Donetsk	6	2	0	4	10	15	−5	6	Transfer to UEFA Cup
4	(Czech Republic) Sparta Prague	6	1	0	5	6	13	−7	3	

Source: UEFA

12 September 2000 1	Sparta Prague (Czech Republic)	0–1	(England) Arsenal	Prague
			Sylvinho 33'	Stadium: Letná; Attendance: 17,666; Referee: Gilles Veissière (France)

20 September 2000 2	Arsenal (England)	3–2	(Ukraine) Shakhtar Donetsk	London
	Wiltord 45'; Keown 85', 90'	Report	Bakharev 26'; Vorobey 29'	Stadium: Highbury; Attendance: 33,922; Referee: Hartmut Strampe (Germany)

27 September 2000 3	Arsenal (England)	2–0	(Italy) Lazio	London
	Ljungberg 43', 56'	Report		Stadium: Highbury; Attendance: 34,521; Referee: José García Aranda (Spain)

17 October 2000 4	Lazio (Italy)	1–1	(England) Arsenal	Rome
	Nedvěd 25'	Report	Pires 88'	Stadium: Stadio Olimpico; Attendance: 40,151; Referee: Hellmut Krug (Germany)

25 October 2000 5	Arsenal (England)	4–2	(Czech Republic) Sparta Prague	London
	Parlour 5'; Lauren 8'; Dixon 35'; Kanu 51'	Report	Labant 40' (pen.); Rosický 90'	Stadium: Highbury; Attendance: 34,397; Referee: Alain Hamer (Luxembourg)

7 November 2000 6	Shakhtar Donetsk (Ukraine)	3–0	(England) Arsenal	Donetsk
	Atelkin 34'; Vorobey 57'; Byelik 66'	Report		Stadium: Shakhtar Stadium; Attendance: 30,000; Referee: Knud Erik Fisker (Denmark)

=== Second group stage ===
Arsenal succumbed to a 4–1 defeat in their opening match against Spartak Moscow, which was the biggest loss inflicted on the club in 18 years. The team let slip a two-goal lead against Bayern Munich at Highbury on 5 December 2000, before winning 1–0 at Olympique Lyonnais to keep their aspirations of qualifying for the quarter-finals attainable. In the reverse fixture, an equaliser scored by Edmílson in the last minute of normal time prompted Wenger to rue fatigue and the absence of captain Adams. Arsenal defeated Spartak Moscow by a solitary goal and in spite of losing to Bayern Munich on 14 March 2001, Lyon's draw with Spartak Moscow meant Arsenal qualified for the quarter-finals by the head-to-head rule.

Pos	Team	Pld	W	D	L	GF	GA	GD	Pts	Qualification
1	(Germany) Bayern Munich	6	4	1	1	8	5	+3	13	Advance to knockout stage
2	(England) Arsenal	6	2	2	2	6	8	−2	8	Advance to knockout stage
3	(France) Lyon	6	2	2	2	8	4	+4	8	
4	(Russia) Spartak Moscow	6	1	1	4	5	10	−5	4	

Source: UEFA

22 November 2000 1	Spartak Moscow (Russia)	4–1	(England) Arsenal	Moscow
17:00	Marcão 29', 51'; Titov 77'; Robson 82'	Report	Sylvinho 2'	Stadium: Luzhniki Stadium; Attendance: 63,000; Referee: Pierluigi Collina (Italy)

5 December 2000 2	Arsenal (England)	2–2	(Germany) Bayern Munich	London
20:45	Henry 4'; Kanu 55'	Report	Tarnat 56'; Scholl 66'	Stadium: Highbury; Attendance: 35,318; Referee: Stefano Braschi (Switzerland)

13 February 2001 3	Lyon (France)	0–1	(England) Arsenal	Lyon
20:45		Report	Henry 59'	Stadium: Stade de Gerland; Attendance: 42,000; Referee: Urs Meier (Italy)

21 February 2001 4	Arsenal (England)	1–1	(France) Lyon	London
20:45	Bergkamp 33'	Report	Edmílson 90'	Stadium: Highbury; Attendance: 34,303; Referee: Ľuboš Michel (Slovakia)

6 March 2001 5	Arsenal (England)	1–0	(Russia) Spartak Moscow	London
20:45	Henry 82'	Report		Stadium: Highbury; Attendance: 35,296; Referee: Rune Pedersen (Norway)

14 March 2001 6	Bayern Munich (Germany)	1–0	(England) Arsenal	Munich
20:45	Élber 10'	Report		Stadium: Olympiastadion; Attendance: 58,000; Referee: Anders Frisk (Sweden)

=== Knockout stage ===
==== Quarter-finals ====
Arsenal faced Spanish club Valencia and won 2–1 at Highbury in the first leg, with goals scored by Henry and Parlour. The team however were beaten 1–0 at the Estadio Mestalla, thus being knocked-out on away goals.

4 April 2001 First leg	Arsenal (England)	2–1	(Spain) Valencia	London
20:45	Henry 58'; Parlour 60'	Report	Ayala 41'	Stadium: Highbury; Attendance: 35,104; Referee: Dick Jol (Netherlands)

17 April 2001 Second leg	Valencia (Spain)	1–0 (2–2 agg.)	(England) Arsenal	Valencia
20:45	Carew 76'	Report		Stadium: Mestalla Stadium; Attendance: 48,000; Referee: Kim Milton Nielsen (Denmark)
Note: Valencia won on away goals.

== Player statistics ==
Numbers in parentheses denote appearances as substitute.
Players with name struck through and marked † left the club during the playing season.

No.	Pos.	Nat.	Name	Premier League		FA Cup		League Cup		Champions League		Total		Discipline	
No.	Pos.	Nat.	Name	Apps	Goals	Apps	Goals	Apps	Goals	Apps	Goals	Apps	Goals	A yellow rectangular card	A red rectangular card
1	GK	ENG	David Seaman	24	0	5	0	0	0	10	0	39	0	1	0
2	DF	ENG	Lee Dixon	26 (3)	1	6	0	0	0	11	1	43 (3)	2	4	0
3	DF	LAT	Igors Stepanovs	9	0	3	0	1	1	0	0	13	1	3	0
4	MF	FRA	Patrick Vieira	28 (2)	5	5 (1)	1	0	0	12	0	45 (3)	6	8	2
5	DF	ENG	Martin Keown	28	0	2	0	0	0	9	2	39	2	8	0
6	DF	ENG	Tony Adams	26	1	4	1	0	0	8	0	38	2	8	0
7	MF	FRA	Robert Pires	29 (4)	4	6	3	0	0	11 (1)	1	45 (5)	8	2	0
8	MF	SWE	Freddie Ljungberg	25 (5)	6	4 (1)	1	0	0	10 (3)	2	38 (9)	9	6	0
10	FW	NED	Dennis Bergkamp	19 (6)	3	4 (1)	1	0	0	3 (2)	1	26 (9)	5	0	0
11	FW	FRA	Sylvain Wiltord	20 (7)	8	5 (1)	6	1	0	3 (10)	1	29 (18)	15	0	0
12	DF	CMR	Lauren	15 (3)	2	4	0	0	0	6 (5)	1	25 (8)	3	6	0
13	GK	AUT	Alex Manninger	11	0	1	0	0	0	2	0	14	0	0	0
14	FW	FRA	Thierry Henry	27 (8)	17	3 (1)	1	0	0	14	4	44 (9)	22	9	0
15	MF	ENG	Ray Parlour	28 (5)	4	3 (1)	0	0	0	9 (1)	2	40 (7)	4	9	0
16	DF	BRA	Sylvinho	23 (1)	2	1 (2)	0	0	0	6 (1)	2	30 (4)	4	3	0
17	MF	BRA	Edu	2 (3)	0	0	0	(1)	0	0	0	2 (3)	0	0	0
18	DF	FRA	Gilles Grimandi	28 (2)	1	2 (1)	0	0	0	8	0	38 (3)	1	4	1
19	MF	GER	Stefan Malz	(1)	0	(2)	0	0	0	0	0	(3)	0	0	0
20	DF	ENG	Matthew Upson	(2)	0	0	0	1	0	1	0	2 (2)	0	0	0
21	FW	LIT	Tomas Danilevičius	(2)	0	(1)	0	0	0	0	0	(3)	0	0	0
22	DF	UKR	Oleh Luzhnyi	16 (3)	0	2	0	0	0	8	0	26 (2)	0	1	0
23	DF	ARG	Nelson Vivas	3 (9)	0	1 (2)	0	1	0	3 (4)	0	8 (15)	0	0	0
24	GK	ENG	John Lukic	3	0	0	0	0	0	1	0	4	0	0	0
25	FW	NGR	Nwankwo Kanu	13 (14)	3	(1)	0	0	0	11 (3)	2	24 (18)	5	1	0
27	FW	LBR	~~Christopher Wreh~~ †	0	0	0	0	(1)	0	0	0	(1)	0	1	0
28	FW	IRE	Graham Barrett	0	0	0	0	1	0	0	0	1	0	0	0
29	DF	ENG	Ashley Cole	15 (2)	3	5 (1)	0	1	0	8 (1)	0	29 (4)	3	6	0
30	MF	ENG	~~Paolo Vernazza~~ †	(2)	1	0	0	1	0	(1)	0	1 (3)	1	0	0
31	GK	ENG	Stuart Taylor	0	0	0	0	1	0	0	0	1	0	0	0
32	DF	ENG	~~Rhys Weston~~ †	0	0	0	0	1	0	0	0	1	0	0	0
35	MF	GER	Moritz Volz	0	0	0	0	1	0	0	0	1	0	0	0
36	MF	ENG	Jermaine Pennant	0	0	0	0	1	0	0	0	1	0	0	0
38	MF	GER	Alberto Méndez	0	0	0	0	(1)	0	0	0	(1)	0	0	0
38	MF	ENG	Lee Canoville	0	0	0	0	(1)	0	0	0	(1)	0	0	0

== See also ==
- 2000–01 in English football
- List of Arsenal F.C. seasons
