= List of football clubs in Spain by major honours won =

This is a list of the major honours won by football clubs in Spain. It lists every Spanish association football club to have won any of the domestic and international trophies recognized as major titles by governing bodies.

== Honours table ==
LL
La Liga, began in 1929.
CDR
The Copa del Rey began in 1903 as an annual cup tournament for Spanish football clubs. Prior to the formation of La Liga in 1929 it served as a de facto national championship.
SE
The Supercopa de España began in 1982 as a two-team super cup competition; the current version has been contested since 2019–20 by four teams: the winners and runners-up of La Liga and the winners and runners-up of the Copa del Rey.
CL
The Copa de la Liga was played from 1983 to 1986.
CED
The Copa Eva Duarte was a Spanish football super cup tournament organized by the Royal Spanish Football Federation (RFEF) and contested by the winners of La Liga and the Copa del Rey.
CP
The Copa Presidente FEF. A single edition played from 1941 to 1947.
UCL
The UEFA Champions League. Since 1955. Known as the European Cup until 1992.
UEL
The UEFA Europa League. Since 1971. Known as the UEFA Cup until 2009.
UCWC
The UEFA Cup Winners' Cup. Held from 1960 until 1999. Known as the European Cup Winners' Cup until 1995.
LC
The Latin Cup, played from 1949 to 1957, was an international football tournament for club sides from the Latin European nations of France, Italy, Spain, and Portugal. In 1949, the football federations came together and requested FIFA to launch the competition. European clubs could not afford hefty travel costs, so the tournaments were staged at the end of every season in a single host country. The competition featured two semi-finals, a third place play-off and a final. This competition is considered a predecessor of club tournaments in Europe, such as the UEFA Champions League, the first edition of which was held in 1955.
ICFC
The Inter-Cities Fairs Cup. Held from 1955 to 1971. Although not organised by UEFA, it is included here because it is the predecessor to the UEFA Cup, today Europa League.
UIC
The UEFA Intertoto Cup. Held from 1995 to 2008.
USC
The UEFA Super Cup. Known as the European Super Cup until 1995. Official since 1973.
FCWC
The FIFA Club World Cup. First edition held in 2000, then annually since 2005 to 2023.
FIC
The FIFA Intercontinental Cup is an international men's association football competition organised by the FIFA. The first edition take place in 2024. The competition features the club champions of the six confederations of FIFA, and is played as a knockout tournament with the European team receiving a bye to the final.
IC
The Intercontinental Cup. Held from 1960 to 2004. Although the competition was organised by UEFA and CONMEBOL, it was officially merged into the FIFA Club World Cup and the winners are recognised by FIFA as club world champions.

Rank	Domestic cups								Continental Cup								Worldwide cups					Honours	
Rank	Club	LL	CDR	CL	SE	CED	CP	Total	UCL	UEL	UCWC	LC	ICFC	UIC	USC	Total	FCWC	FIC	IC	IAC	Total	Total	Last trophy
1	Real Madrid	**36**	20	1	13	1	0	71	**15**	2	0	**2**	0	0	**6**	25	**5**	**1**	**3**	**1**	10	106	2024 FIFA Intercontinental Cup
2	Barcelona	29	**32**	**2**	**16**	**3**	0	82	5	0	**4**	**2**	**3**	0	5	19	3	0	0	0	3	104	2025–26 La Liga
3	Athletic Bilbao	8	24	0	3	1	0	36	0	0	0	0	0	0	0	0	0	0	0	0	0	36	2023–24 Copa del Rey
4	Atlético Madrid	11	10	0	2	1	**1**	25	0	3	1	0	0	1	3	8	0	0	1	0	1	34	2020–21 La Liga
5	Valencia	6	8	0	1	1	0	16	0	1	1	0	2	1	2	7	0	0	0	0	0	23	2018–19 Copa del Rey
6	Sevilla	1	5	0	1	0	0	7	0	**7**	0	0	0	0	1	8	0	0	0	0	0	15	2022–23 UEFA Europa League
7	Zaragoza	0	6	0	1	0	0	7	0	0	1	0	1	0	0	2	0	0	0	0	0	9	2004 Supercopa de España
8	Real Sociedad	2	4	0	1	0	0	7	0	0	0	0	0	0	0	0	0	0	0	0	0	7	2025–26 Copa del Rey
9	Deportivo La Coruña	1	2	0	3	0	0	6	0	0	0	0	0	0	0	0	0	0	0	0	0	6	2002 Supercopa de España
10	Real Betis	1	3	0	0	0	0	4	0	0	0	0	0	0	0	0	0	0	0	0	0	4	2021–22 Copa del Rey
11	Espanyol	0	4	0	0	0	0	4	0	0	0	0	0	0	0	0	0	0	0	0	0	4	2005–06 Copa del Rey
12	Real Unión	0	4	0	0	0	0	4	0	0	0	0	0	0	0	0	0	0	0	0	0	4	1927 Copa del Rey
13	Villarreal	0	0	0	0	0	0	0	0	1	0	0	0	**2**	0	3	0	0	0	0	0	3	2020–21 UEFA Europa League
14	Mallorca	0	1	0	1	0	0	2	0	0	0	0	0	0	0	0	0	0	0	0	0	2	2002–03 Copa del Rey
15	Málaga	0	0	0	0	0	0	0	0	0	0	0	0	1	0	1	0	0	0	0	0	1	2002 UEFA Intertoto Cup
15	Celta Vigo	0	0	0	0	0	0	0	0	0	0	0	0	1	0	1	0	0	0	0	0	1	2000 UEFA Intertoto Cup
15	Arenas	0	1	0	0	0	0	1	0	0	0	0	0	0	0	0	0	0	0	0	0	1	1919 Copa del Rey
15	Valladolid	0	0	1	0	0	0	1	0	0	0	0	0	0	0	0	0	0	0	0	0	1	1984 Copa de la Liga

Numbers in bold are Spanish record totals for that competition.

== See also ==
- List of football clubs by competitive honours won
- La Liga
- List of Spanish football champions
- Copa del Rey
- Supercopa de España
- List of UEFA club competition winners
- Football records and statistics in Spain
