= Joan Gamper Trophy =

Annual association football exhibition match hosted by FC Barcelona

Joan Gamper Trophy Trofeu Joan Gamper
- The trophy awarded to champions
- Founded: 1966; 60 years ago
- Region: Catalonia
- Teams: 4 (1966–96); 2 (1997–present)
- Current champions: (Spain) Barcelona (48 titles)
- Most championships: (Spain) Barcelona (48 titles)
- Broadcaster(s): TV3 Televisió de Catalunya; Barça TV
- Website: fcbarcelona.com

The Joan Gamper Trophy (Catalan: Trofeu Joan Gamper, or simply TJG) or Joan Gamper Cup is an annual association football exhibition match held in August, before the start of Barcelona's La Liga season, where top division clubs from the world compete against them. The competition is hosted by FC Barcelona at the Camp Nou stadium and is named in honour of Joan Gamper, a founding member, player, and later president of the club. The competition was inaugurated in 1966 by Enric Llaudet, one of Gamper's successors as club president. The trophy itself is an 800-gram (1.8 lb) silver cup with five micrometres of gold finishing, on top of a 10-kilogram (22 lb) marble plinth base.

Initially, four teams participated in the competition, which featured two semi-finals, a third-place play-off, and a final. For the first competition in 1966, Barcelona were joined by Belgium's Anderlecht, France's Nantes, and Germany's 1. FC Köln. Barcelona beat the German team 3–1 in the final. Köln subsequently won the competition in 1978 and 1981 and were runners-up in 1979, making them the only team, other than the hosts, to win the competition more than once. The next edition saw the first appearance of another Spanish team, Atlético Madrid, who along with the hosts, were joined by German side Bayern Munich, and Argentina's Boca Juniors. The latter two clubs are among the most regular guests. Bayern were runners-up in 1984, 1987 and 2006, while Boca became the first of several South American guests to be invited and have since returned in 1977, 1984, 2003, 2008 and 2018. The only non-European team to win the tournament was Brazil's Internacional, in 1982.

Subsequent competitions have included teams from Italy's Serie A, Germany's Bundesliga, and other leagues. Other top-flight Spanish clubs have also occasionally been invited, including Tenerife and Valencia, who were winners in 1993 and 1994, respectively. Since 1997, the competition has only featured a one-off game, the tournament being shortened due to an increased fixture list and a shorter close season. If the match is tied after ninety minutes, no extra time is played and the winner is decided by a penalty shoot-out.

== Winners and results ==
- (a.e.t.): Winners determined after extra time.
- (p): Winners determined via a penalty shoot-out.

=== Four teams (1966–1996) ===
| Ed. | Year | Winners | Score | Runners-up | Third place | Score | Fourth place |
|---|---|---|---|---|---|---|---|
| 1 | 1966 | (Spain) Barcelona | 3–1 | (West Germany) 1. FC Köln | (Belgium) Anderlecht | 7–0 | (France) Nantes |
| 2 | 1967 | (Spain) Barcelona | 2–1 | (Spain) Atlético Madrid | (Argentina) Boca Juniors | 1–0 | (West Germany) Bayern Munich |
| 3 | 1968 | (Spain) Barcelona | 5–4 | (Brazil) Flamengo | (Spain) Athletic Bilbao | 3–1 | (West Germany) Werder Bremen |
| 4 | 1969 | (Spain) Barcelona | 2–1 | (Spain) Zaragoza | (Czechoslovakia) Slovan Bratislava | 2–1 | (Argentina) Estudiantes (LP) |
| 5 | 1970 | (Hungary) Újpest | 3–1 | (Soviet Union) Dynamo Moscow | (Spain) Barcelona | 1–0 | (West Germany) Schalke 04 |
| 6 | 1971 | (Spain) Barcelona | 1–0 | (Argentina) Chacarita Juniors | (Hungary) Budapest Honvéd | 2–0 | (West Germany) Bayern Munich |
| 7 | 1972 | (West Germany) Borussia MG | 3–2 | (Bulgaria) CSKA Sofia | (Spain) Barcelona | 0–0 (5–4 p) | (Brazil) Vasco da Gama |
| 8 | 1973 | (Spain) Barcelona | 2–2 (5–3 p) | (West Germany) Borussia MG | (Peru) Municipal | 1–1 (8–7 p) | (Argentina) San Lorenzo |
| 9 | 1974 | (Spain) Barcelona | 4–1 | (Scotland) Rangers | (Spain) Athletic Bilbao | 1–0 | (Netherlands) Ajax |
| 10 | 1975 | (Spain) Barcelona | 2–1 | (Netherlands) Feyenoord | (Czechoslovakia) Spartak Trnava | 1–1 (7–6 p) | (Hungary) Újpest |
| 11 | 1976 | (Spain) Barcelona | 2–0 | (West Germany) Eintracht Frankfurt | (Czechoslovakia) Sparta Prague | 1–1 (4–3 p) | (Soviet Union) CSKA Moscow |
| 12 | 1977 | (Spain) Barcelona | 4–1 | (West Germany) Schalke 04 | (Argentina) Boca Juniors | 2–1 | (Czechoslovakia) Slovan Bratislava |
| 13 | 1978 | (West Germany) 1. FC Köln | 5–0 | (Austria) Rapid Wien | (Spain) Barcelona | 3–2 | (Brazil) Botafogo |
| 14 | 1979 | (Spain) Barcelona | 3–2 (a.e.t.) | (West Germany) 1. FC Köln | (Belgium) Anderlecht | 2–2 (6–5 p) | (Switzerland) Zürich |
| 15 | 1980 | (Spain) Barcelona | 2–1 | (Brazil) Vasco da Gama | (Argentina) River Plate | 0–0 (4–2 p) | (Netherlands) PSV Eindhoven |
| 16 | 1981 | (West Germany) 1. FC Köln | 4–0 | (Spain) Barcelona | (Brazil) Vasco da Gama | 2–1 | (England) Ipswich Town |
| 17 | 1982 | (Brazil) Internacional | 3–1 | (England) Manchester City | (West Germany) 1. FC Köln | 1–1 (5–4 p) | (Spain) Barcelona |
| 18 | 1983 | (Spain) Barcelona | 2–1 | (West Germany) Borussia Dortmund | (Belgium) Anderlecht | 4–2 | (England) Nottingham Forest |
| 19 | 1984 | (Spain) Barcelona | 3–1 | (West Germany) Bayern Munich | (Argentina) Boca Juniors | 2–0 | (England) Aston Villa |
| 20 | 1985 | (Spain) Barcelona | 3–1 | (West Germany) Hamburger SV | (Netherlands) Ajax | 4–2 | (Austria) Rapid Wien |
| 21 | 1986 | (Spain) Barcelona | 1–0 | (Netherlands) PSV Eindhoven | (England) Tottenham Hotspur | 2–1 | (Italy) Milan |
| 22 | 1987 | (Portugal) Porto | 2–0 | (West Germany) Bayern Munich | (Spain) Barcelona | 3–2 | (Netherlands) Ajax |
| 23 | 1988 | (Spain) Barcelona | 3–1 | (Romania) Steaua București | (Uruguay) Peñarol | 3–3 (5–4 p) | (Netherlands) PSV Eindhoven |
| 24 | 1989 | (Belgium) Mechelen | 2–0 | (France) Sochaux | (Spain) Barcelona | 1–0 | (Brazil) Internacional |
| 25 | 1990 | (Spain) Barcelona | 3–1 | (Belgium) Anderlecht | (Netherlands) PSV Eindhoven | 2–1 | (Soviet Union) Spartak Moscow |
| 26 | 1991 | (Spain) Barcelona | 3–0 | (France) Marseille | (Brazil) Internacional | 2–0 | (Austria) Rapid Wien |
| 27 | 1992 | (Spain) Barcelona | 2–0 | (Netherlands) Feyenoord | (Bulgaria) CSKA Sofia | 3–3 (8–7 p) | (Belgium) Club Brugge |
| 28 | 1993 | (Spain) Tenerife | 3–1 | (Spain) Barcelona | (France) Bordeaux | 2–0 | (Croatia) Hajduk Split |
| 29 | 1994 | (Spain) Valencia | 4–1 | (Spain) Barcelona | (Netherlands) PSV Eindhoven | 2–1 | (Italy) Brescia |
| 30 | 1995 | (Spain) Barcelona | 5–1 | (Argentina) San Lorenzo | (Netherlands) Feyenoord | 3–2 | (Bulgaria) CSKA Sofia |
| 31 | 1996 | (Spain) Barcelona | 2–1 | (Italy) Internazionale | (Belgium) Anderlecht | 3–2 | (Argentina) San Lorenzo |

=== Two teams (1997–present) ===
| Ed. | Year | Winners | Score | Runners-up | Attend. | Barcelona goalscorers | Man of the match |
|---|---|---|---|---|---|---|---|
| 32 | 1997 | (Spain) Barcelona | 2–2 (6–5 p) | (Italy) Sampdoria | c. 20,000 | Anderson (11), Giovanni (67 p.) | |
| 33 | 1998 | (Spain) Barcelona | 2–2 (5–4 p) | (Brazil) Santos | c. 10,000 | Rivaldo (39), Figo (41) | |
| 34 | 1999 | (Spain) Barcelona | 3–1 | (Portugal) Sporting CP | c. 20,000 | Figo (7 p.), Dani (24), Déhu (44) | |
| 35 | 2000 | (Spain) Barcelona | 2–1 | (Netherlands) PSV Eindhoven | c. 45,000 | Rivaldo (14 p.), Gerard (25) | |
| 36 | 2001 | (Spain) Barcelona | 3–2 | (Italy) Parma | c. 50,000 | Saviola (30), Christanval (33), Alfonso (75) | |
| 37 | 2002 | (Spain) Barcelona | 1–0 | (Serbia and Montenegro) Red Star Belgrade | 35,640 | Rochemback (80) | |
| 38 | 2003 | (Spain) Barcelona | 1–1 (5–3 p) | (Argentina) Boca Juniors | 90,075 | Gerard (68) | |
| 39 | 2004 | (Spain) Barcelona | 2–1 | (Italy) Milan | 98,771 | Giuly (36), Iniesta (68) | |
| 40 | 2005 | (Italy) Juventus | 2–2 (4–2 p) | (Spain) Barcelona | 91,826 | Iniesta (66), Van Bronckhorst (69) | |
| 41 | 2006 | (Spain) Barcelona | 4–0 | (Germany) Bayern Munich | 76,644 | Ronaldinho (29), Eto'o (32, 39), Saviola (51) | |
| 42 | 2007 | (Spain) Barcelona | 5–0 | (Italy) Internazionale | 98,559 | Ronaldinho (6 p.), Dos Santos (11), Touré (37), Iniesta (55), Motta (78) | |
| 43 | 2008 | (Spain) Barcelona | 2–1 | (Argentina) Boca Juniors | 71,210 | Puyol (90+2), Eto'o (90+5) | |
| 44 | 2009 | (England) Manchester City | 1–0 | (Spain) Barcelona | 94,123 | — | |
| 45 | 2010 | (Spain) Barcelona | 1–1 (3–1 p) | (Italy) Milan | 96,165 | Villa (46) | (Spain) José Manuel Pinto |
| 46 | 2011 | (Spain) Barcelona | 5–0 | (Italy) Napoli | 78,002 | Fàbregas (26), Keita (31), Pedro (62), Messi (66, 77) | (Mali) Seydou Keita |
| 47 | 2012 | (Italy) Sampdoria | 1–0 | (Spain) Barcelona | 55,498 | — | (Spain) Sergi Roberto |
| 48 | 2013 | (Spain) Barcelona | 8–0 | (Brazil) Santos | 81,251 | Messi (8), Léo (12 o.g.), Sánchez (20), Pedro (28), Fàbregas (51, 66), Adriano (73), Dongou (81) | (Argentina) Lionel Messi |
| 49 | 2014 | (Spain) Barcelona | 6–0 | (Mexico) León | 72,475 | Messi (3), Neymar (12, 43), Munir (55, 78), Sandro (89) | (Argentina) Lionel Messi |
| 50 | 2015 | (Spain) Barcelona | 3–0 | (Italy) Roma | 94,422 | Neymar (26), Messi (41), Rakitić (65) | (Croatia) Ivan Rakitić |
| 51 | 2016 | (Spain) Barcelona | 3–2 | (Italy) Sampdoria | 72,334 | L. Suárez (16), Messi (21, 34) | (Argentina) Lionel Messi |
| 52 | 2017 | (Spain) Barcelona | 5–0 | (Brazil) Chapecoense | 64,705 | Deulofeu (6), Busquets (11), Messi (28), L. Suárez (55), D. Suárez (74) | (Spain) Sergio Busquets |
| 53 | 2018 | (Spain) Barcelona | 3–0 | (Argentina) Boca Juniors | 70,089 | Malcom (18), Messi (39), Rafinha (67) | (Argentina) Lionel Messi |
| 54 | 2019 | (Spain) Barcelona | 2–1 | (England) Arsenal | 98,812 | Maitland-Niles (69 o.g.), L. Suárez (90) | (Netherlands) Frenkie de Jong |
| 55 | 2020 | (Spain) Barcelona | 1–0 | (Spain) Elche | 0 (Note: The match was behind closed doors due to the COVID-19 pandemic in Spain.) | Griezmann (2) | (Brazil) Philippe Coutinho |
| 56 | 2021 | (Spain) Barcelona | 3–0 | (Italy) Juventus | 2,924 (Note: The match was played at the Johan Cruyff Stadium.) | Depay (3), Braithwaite (57), Puig (90+2) | (Brazil) Neto |
| 57 | 2022 | (Spain) Barcelona | 6–0 | (Mexico) UNAM | 83,021 | Lewandowski (3), Pedri (5, 19), Dembélé (10), Aubameyang (49), F. de Jong (84) | (Poland) Robert Lewandowski |
| 58 | 2023 | (Spain) Barcelona | 4–2 | (England) Tottenham Hotspur | 35,224 (Note: The match was played at the Estadi Olímpic Lluís Companys.) | Lewandowski (3), Torres (81), Fati (90), Ezzalzouli (90+3) | (Netherlands) Frenkie de Jong |
| 59 | 2024 | (France) Monaco | 3–0 | (Spain) Barcelona | 41,416 | — | (Spain) Pau Víctor |
| 60 | 2025 | (Spain) Barcelona | 5–0 | (Italy) Como | 6,000 | López (21, 35), Raphinha (37), Yamal (42, 49) | (Spain) Fermín López |
| 61 | 2026 | (Spain) Barcelona | 2–1 | (Egypt) Al Ahly | 54,224 | Abdelkarim (29), Raphinha (45 p.) | (Brazil) Raphinha |

=== Women's Gamper Trophy ===
| Ed. | Year | Winners | Score | Runners-up | Attend. | Barcelona Femení goalscorers | MVP |
|---|---|---|---|---|---|---|---|
| 1 | 2021 | (Spain) Barcelona | 6–0 | (Italy) Juventus | 1,783 | Bonmatí (2), Hermoso (3, 16), Paredes (12), Graham Hansen (27), Vilamala (48) | (Spain) Jenni Hermoso |
| 2 | 2022 | (Spain) Barcelona | 6–0 | (France) Montpellier | 5,124 | Geyse (23, 52), Guijarro (27, 45), Rolfö (55), Arias (77) | (Spain) Patricia Guijarro |
| 3 | 2023 | (Spain) Barcelona | 5–0 | (Italy) Juventus | 5,485 | Graham Hansen (5), Lenzini (33 o.g.), Vilamala (35), Vicky (41), León (76) | (Spain) Mapi León |
| 4 | 2024 | (Spain) Barcelona | 2–0 | (Italy) Milan | 5,579 | Pajor (18), Putellas (90) | (Poland) Ewa Pajor |
| 5 | 2026 | (Spain) Barcelona | 3–1 | (England) Brighton & Hove Albion | 3,904 | Brugts (6), Pina (22), Graham Hansen (32) | (Spain) Patricia Guijarro |

Footnotes

== Performance by team ==
=== Men's ===
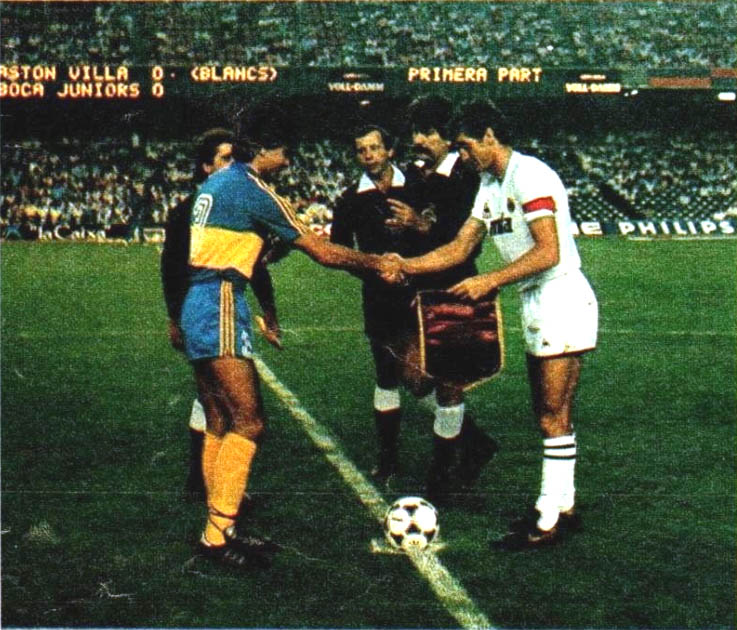
Carlos Córdoba (left) and Dennis Mortimer, captains of Boca Juniors and Aston Villa respectively, before the 1984 third place match

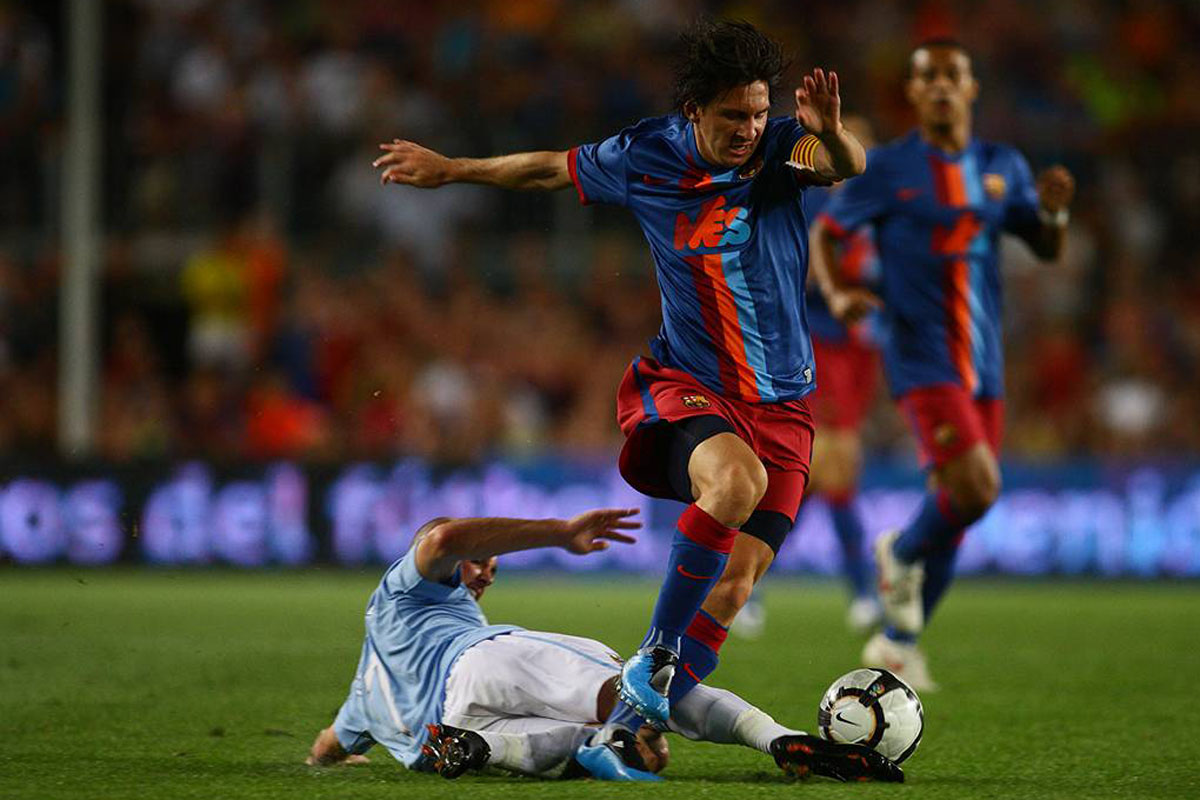
Lionel Messi dribbling during the Barcelona v Manchester City match in 2009

| Team | Winners | Runners-up | Third | Fourth | Total |
|---|---|---|---|---|---|
Men's Joan Gamper Trophy statistics
| (Spain) Barcelona | 48 | 7 | 5 | 1 | 61 |
| (Germany) 1. FC Köln | 2 | 2 | 1 | — | 5 |
| (Italy) Sampdoria | 1 | 2 | — | — | 3 |
| (Italy) Juventus | 1 | 1 | — | — | 2 |
| (England) Manchester City | 1 | 1 | — | — | 2 |
| (Germany) Borussia Mönchengladbach | 1 | 1 | — | — | 2 |
| (Brazil) Internacional | 1 | — | 1 | 1 | 3 |
| (Hungary) Újpest | 1 | — | — | 1 | 2 |
| (Belgium) Mechelen | 1 | — | — | — | 1 |
| (France) Monaco | 1 | — | — | — | 1 |
| (Portugal) Porto | 1 | — | — | — | 1 |
| (Spain) Tenerife | 1 | — | — | — | 1 |
| (Spain) Valencia | 1 | — | — | — | 1 |
| (Argentina) Boca Juniors | — | 3 | 3 | — | 6 |
| (Germany) Bayern Munich | — | 3 | — | 2 | 5 |
| (Netherlands) PSV Eindhoven | — | 2 | 2 | 2 | 6 |
| (Netherlands) Feyenoord | — | 2 | 1 | — | 3 |
| (Italy) Milan | — | 2 | — | 1 | 3 |
| (Italy) Internazionale | — | 2 | — | — | 2 |
| (Brazil) Santos | — | 2 | — | — | 2 |
| (Belgium) Anderlecht | — | 1 | 4 | — | 5 |
| (Bulgaria) CSKA Sofia | — | 1 | 1 | 1 | 3 |
| (Brazil) Vasco da Gama | — | 1 | 1 | 1 | 3 |
| (England) Tottenham Hotspur | — | 1 | 1 | — | 2 |
| (Austria) Rapid Wien | — | 1 | — | 2 | 3 |
| (Argentina) San Lorenzo | — | 1 | — | 2 | 3 |
| (Germany) Schalke 04 | — | 1 | — | 1 | 2 |
| (Egypt) Al Ahly | — | 1 | — | — | 1 |
| (England) Arsenal | — | 1 | — | — | 1 |
| (Spain) Atlético Madrid | — | 1 | — | — | 1 |
| (Germany) Borussia Dortmund | — | 1 | — | — | 1 |
| (Argentina) Chacarita Juniors | — | 1 | — | — | 1 |
| (Brazil) Chapecoense | — | 1 | — | — | 1 |
| (Italy) Como | — | 1 | — | — | 1 |
| (Russia) Dynamo Moscow | — | 1 | — | — | 1 |
| (Germany) Eintracht Frankfurt | — | 1 | — | — | 1 |
| (Spain) Elche | — | 1 | — | — | 1 |
| (Brazil) Flamengo | — | 1 | — | — | 1 |
| (Germany) Hamburger SV | — | 1 | — | — | 1 |
| (Mexico) León | — | 1 | — | — | 1 |
| (France) Marseille | — | 1 | — | — | 1 |
| (Italy) Napoli | — | 1 | — | — | 1 |
| (Italy) Parma | — | 1 | — | — | 1 |
| (Scotland) Rangers | — | 1 | — | — | 1 |
| (Serbia) Red Star Belgrade | — | 1 | — | — | 1 |
| (Italy) Roma | — | 1 | — | — | 1 |
| (France) Sochaux | — | 1 | — | — | 1 |
| (Portugal) Sporting CP | — | 1 | — | — | 1 |
| (Romania) Steaua București | — | 1 | — | — | 1 |
| (Mexico) UNAM | — | 1 | — | — | 1 |
| (Spain) Zaragoza | — | 1 | — | — | 1 |
| (Spain) Athletic Bilbao | — | — | 2 | — | 2 |
| (Netherlands) Ajax | — | — | 1 | 2 | 3 |
| (Slovakia) Slovan Bratislava | — | — | 1 | 1 | 2 |
| (France) Bordeaux | — | — | 1 | — | 1 |
| (Hungary) Budapest Honvéd | — | — | 1 | — | 1 |
| (Peru) Municipal | — | — | 1 | — | 1 |
| (Uruguay) Peñarol | — | — | 1 | — | 1 |
| (Argentina) River Plate | — | — | 1 | — | 1 |
| (Slovakia) Spartak Trnava | — | — | 1 | — | 1 |
| (Czech Republic) Sparta Prague | — | — | 1 | — | 1 |
| (England) Aston Villa | — | — | — | 1 | 1 |
| (Brazil) Botafogo | — | — | — | 1 | 1 |
| (Italy) Brescia | — | — | — | 1 | 1 |
| (Belgium) Club Brugge | — | — | — | 1 | 1 |
| (Russia) CSKA Moscow | — | — | — | 1 | 1 |
| (Argentina) Estudiantes (LP) | — | — | — | 1 | 1 |
| (Croatia) Hajduk Split | — | — | — | 1 | 1 |
| (England) Ipswich Town | — | — | — | 1 | 1 |
| (France) Nantes | — | — | — | 1 | 1 |
| (England) Nottingham Forest | — | — | — | 1 | 1 |
| (Russia) Spartak Moscow | — | — | — | 1 | 1 |
| (Germany) Werder Bremen | — | — | — | 1 | 1 |
| (Switzerland) Zürich | — | — | — | 1 | 1 |

=== Women's ===
Women's Joan Gamper Trophy statistics
| Team | Winners | Runners-up | Total |
|---|---|---|---|
| (Spain) Barcelona | 5 | — | 5 |
| (Italy) Juventus | — | 2 | 2 |
| (France) Montpellier | — | 1 | 1 |
| (Italy) Milan | — | 1 | 1 |
| (England) Brighton & Hove Albion | — | 1 | 1 |

== Awards and records ==
=== Awards ===
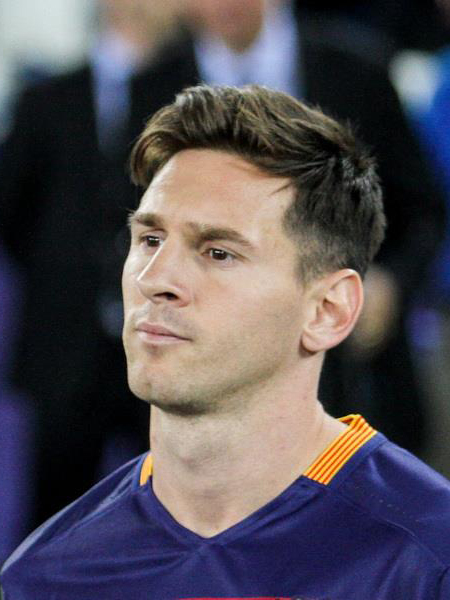
Lionel Messi holds a number of records in the history of the Joan Gamper Trophy

Most Valuable Player

- Lionel Messi is the first player in the history of Joan Gamper Trophy who has won the man of the match award more than once. He has won it four times: in 2013 against Santos, in 2014 against León, in 2016 against Sampdoria, and in 2018 against Boca Juniors.

=== Records ===
Top goalscorers

| Rank | Player | Club | Goals |
|---|---|---|---|
| 1 | (Argentina) Lionel Messi | (Spain) Barcelona | 9 |
| 2 | | (Spain) Barcelona | |
| 2 | (Spain) Juan Manuel Asensi | (Spain) Barcelona | 7 |
| 2 | (Spain) Txiki Begiristain | (Spain) Barcelona | 7 |
| 2 | (Bulgaria) Hristo Stoichkov | (Spain) Barcelona | 7 |
| 5 | (Spain) Josep Maria Fusté | (Spain) Barcelona | 6 |
| 5 | (Spain) Marcial Pina | (Spain) Barcelona | 6 |

Consecutive goalscoring

- Lionel Messi is the only player in the history of Joan Gamper Trophy who has scored in six consecutive editions (2013, 2014, 2015, 2016, 2017, 2018).

== See also ==
- Copa Martini & Rossi
- Trofeo Aldo Rovira
- Premi Barça Jugadors
