= Copa Martini & Rossi =

Series of friendly football matches

Copa Martini & Rossi was the name of a series of friendly football matches between FC Barcelona and several distinguished European teams during the decade of the 1940s. The winner of the game received a silver cup inscribed with the name of the sponsor, the Italian Multinational Martini & Rossi.

The matches took place at Barcelona's Les Corts, usually as the last game of the season, with which homage was given to the retiring players, or as a Christmas season game. This tournament is considered the precursor to the Trofeu Joan Gamper.

This title should not be confused with the Trofeo Martini & Rossi, award that during the same decade was granted to the First Division team with the best goal difference record during the year, and which the FC Barcelona won a record of six times.

== Tournaments ==
- All the editions of the tournament are presented in the following table:

Date	Winner	Runner-up	Result
December 25, 1948; December 26, 1948	(Spain) FC Barcelona	(Denmark) Akademisk Boldklub	1–1; 2–1 (R)
June 12, 1949	(Spain) FC Barcelona	(Portugal) FC Porto	3–1
June 4, 1950	(Spain) FC Barcelona	(Italy) Torino FC	2–1
June 15, 1952	(Spain) FC Barcelona	(France) OGC Nice	8–2
December 25, 1952	(Spain) FC Barcelona	(Germany) Kickers Offenbach	5–2
December 25, 1953	(Spain) FC Barcelona	FK Austria Wien	3–2

== See also ==
- Joan Gamper Trophy
