= 2000 Amsterdam Tournament =

International football competition

The Amsterdam Tournament is a pre-season football tournament held for club teams from around the world, hosted at the Amsterdam ArenA. The 2000 tournament was contested by Ajax, Arsenal, Barcelona and Lazio on 3 August and 5 August 2000. Barcelona won the tournament.

== Table ==
| Team | Pld | W | D | L | GF | GA | GD | Pts |
|---|---|---|---|---|---|---|---|---|
| (Spain) Barcelona | 2 | 1 | 1 | 0 | 5 | 4 | +1 | 9 |
| (Netherlands) Ajax | 2 | 1 | 1 | 0 | 2 | 0 | +2 | 6 |
| (Italy) Lazio | 2 | 0 | 2 | 0 | 3 | 3 | 0 | 5 |
| (England) Arsenal | 2 | 0 | 0 | 2 | 1 | 4 | −3 | 1 |

Source: RSSSF
Rules for classification: An extra point is awarded for each goal scored.

== Matches ==
=== Day 1 ===
2000-08-03

| Ajax (Netherlands) | 0 – 0 | (Italy) Lazio |

Amsterdam Arena, Amsterdam
2000-08-03

| Barcelona (Spain) | 2 – 1 | (England) Arsenal |
|---|---|---|
| Guardiola 3' (pen.); Cocu 39' | | Danilevičius 33' |

Amsterdam Arena, Amsterdam

=== Day 2 ===
2000-08-05

| Lazio (Italy) | 3 – 3 | (Spain) Barcelona |
|---|---|---|
| Mihajlović 22'; Salas 35', 40' | | Dani 36'; Gerard 65'; Rivaldo 75' |

Amsterdam Arena, Amsterdam
2000-08-05

| Ajax (Netherlands) | 2 – 0 | (England) Arsenal |
|---|---|---|
| Arveladze 38'; Hosé 89' |

Amsterdam Arena, Amsterdam
