= 1970–71 Inter-Cities Fairs Cup =

Tournament details
- Teams: 64

Final positions
- Champions: (England) Leeds United (2nd title)
- Runners-up: (Italy) Juventus

Tournament statistics
- Matches played: 126
- Goals scored: 382 (3.03 per match)
- Top scorer: (Italy) Pietro Anastasi (10 goals)

The 1970–71 Inter-Cities Fairs Cup was the 13th and final season of the Inter-Cities Fairs Cup, a European football competition for teams not qualified for the European Cup or the European Cup Winners' Cup. Back in 1969, UEFA determined this would be the final year of the Fairs Cup before taking over the organizational duties and evolving the competition into the UEFA Cup, which is now known as the UEFA Europa League.

The final was played over two legs at Stadio Comunale, Turin, Italy, and at Elland Road, Leeds, England. It was won by Leeds United of England, who defeated the Italian team Juventus on the away goals rule after a 3–3 aggregate draw to claim their second Inter-Cities Fairs Cup title. It was the first time the competition final had been won on the away goals rule.

This was to be the final European title for Leeds United, which would cap off its most successful era later in the decade with two further finals in UEFA-organized tournaments. It was also the second Fairs Cup final lost by Juventus, who still had not won a European title. Notably, the first leg of the final was replayed from scratch two days later after the initially scheduled game, which was abandoned after 51 minutes of play with a score of 0–0 due to heavy rain and a waterlogged pitch.

As no team had ever managed to permanently win the Inter-Cities Fairs trophy that was to be discontinued, its destination was decided in a special play-off between the first and last competition winners: Barcelona and Leeds United, respectively.

== Country team allocation ==
A total of 64 teams from 29 countries were entered in the 1970–71 Inter-Cities Fairs Cup. For the first time, a team from Finland entered the competition, with the allocation scheme being redrawn as follows

- England have five teams qualify due to the use of the title holder berth.
- 5 countries have four teams qualify.
- 3 countries have three teams qualify.
- 10 associations have two teams qualify.
- 10 associations have one team qualify.

Scotland and Yugoslavia gained a fourth berth, which Portugal lost. These places came mainly from the loss of a second Fairs Cup berth by East Germany, Norway and Northern Ireland.

Countries in the 1970–71 Inter-Cities Fairs Cup

Five teams
England
Four teams
Scotland
Italy
Spain
West Germany
(Socialist Federal Republic of Yugoslavia) Yugoslavia

Three teams
Portugal	Belgium	France
Two teams
Hungary	Czechoslovakia	Poland
Bulgaria	Netherlands	Romania
Austria	Greece	Switzerland
Denmark		

One team
East Germany	Turkey
Sweden	Northern Ireland
Norway	Finland
Republic of Ireland	Luxembourg
Malta	Iceland

Did not compete
Wales
Albania
Soviet Union
Cyprus

Wales: There was no national league in Wales before 1992 and the only competition organised by the Football Association of Wales was the Welsh Cup so Wales had just a single participant in European competitions, the winner (or best placed Welsh team as several English teams also competed) of the Welsh Cup which competed in the UEFA Cup Winners' Cup.

=== Teams ===
The labels in the parentheses show how each team qualified for competition:

- TH: Title holders
- CW: Cup winners
- CR: Cup runners-up
- LC: League Cup winners
- 2nd, 3rd, 4th, 5th, 6th, etc.: League position
- P-W: End-of-season European competition play-offs winners
- Sum: Position at the halfway mark or the summer break in a calendar-based league

Qualified teams for 1970–71 Inter-Cities Fairs Cup
(England) Arsenal (TH)	(England) Leeds United (2nd)	(England) Liverpool (5th)	(England) Coventry City (6th)
(England) Newcastle United (7th)	(Scotland) Rangers (2nd)	(Scotland) Hibernian (3rd)	(Scotland) Dundee United (5th)
(Scotland) Kilmarnock (7th)	(Italy) Inter Milan (2nd)	(Italy) Juventus (3rd)	(Italy) Fiorentina (4th)
(Italy) Lazio (8th)	(Spain) Athletic Bilbao (2nd)	(Spain) Sevilla (3rd)	(Spain) Barcelona (4th)
(Spain) Valencia (5th)	(West Germany) Bayern Munich (2nd)	(West Germany) Hertha BSC (3rd)	(West Germany) Köln (4th)
(West Germany) Hamburg (6th)	(Socialist Federal Republic of Yugoslavia) Partizan (2nd)	(Socialist Federal Republic of Yugoslavia) Željezničar (4th)	(Socialist Federal Republic of Yugoslavia) Dinamo Zagreb (6th)
(Socialist Federal Republic of Yugoslavia) Hajduk Split (7th)	(Portugal) Vitória de Setúbal (3rd)	(Portugal) Barreirense (4th)	(Portugal) Vitória de Guimaraes (5th)
(Belgium) La Gantoise (3rd)	(Belgium) Anderlecht (4th)	(Belgium) Beveren (5th)	(France) Marseille (2nd)
(France) Sedan (3rd)	(France) Angoulême (4th)	(Hungary) Ferencváros (2nd)	(Hungary) Pécsi Dózsa (7th)
(Czechoslovakia) Spartak Trnava (2nd)	(Czechoslovakia) Sparta Prague (3rd)	(Poland) Ruch Chorzów (2nd)	(Poland) Katowice (7th)
(Bulgaria) Slavia Sofia (3rd)	(Bulgaria) Botev Plovdiv (4th)	(Netherlands) FC Twente (4th)	(Netherlands) Sparta Rotterdam (5th)
(Romania) Universitatea Craiova (4th)	(Romania) Dinamo București (5th)	(Austria) Wiener SC (2nd)	(Austria) Sturm Graz (3rd)
(Greece) AEK Athens (2nd)	(Greece) PAOK (5th)	(Switzerland) Lausanne-Sport (2nd)	(Switzerland) Grasshoppers (4th)
(Denmark) AB (Sum-2nd)	(Denmark) B 1901 (Sum-3rd)	(East Germany) Dynamo Dresden (3rd)	(Turkey) Eskişehirspor (2nd)
(Sweden) Malmö (Sum-1st)	(Northern Ireland) Coleraine (2nd)	(Norway) Sarpsborg (Sum-1st)	(Finland) Ilves-Kissat (Sum-1st)
(Republic of Ireland) Cork Hibernians (LC)	(Luxembourg) Rumelange (2nd)	(Malta) Sliema Wanderers (2nd)	(Iceland) ÍA (Sum-1st)

Notes

1. England: Derby County originally qualified for the Fairs Cup by finishing 4th in the 1969–70 Football League. However, a disciplinary commission found the team guilty of administrative and financial irregularities. As a result, Derby County was not allowed to compete in the Fairs Cup. Newcastle United, the next best team not qualified for international competition, took its place.
2. Scotland, Yugoslavia, Hungary and Greece: The following teams qualified for the Inter-Cities Fairs Cup due to the 'one city, one team' rule that prevented other teams from competing:
  - Scotland: Kilmarnock qualified instead of Heart of Midlothian (4th), ineligible because of Hibernian also being from Edinburgh, and Dundee (6th), ineligible because of Dundee United.
  - Yugoslavia: Dinamo Zagreb qualified instead of OFK Belgrade (5th), ineligible because of Partizan also being from Belgrade.
  - Hungary: Pécsi Dózsa qualified instead of Budapest Honvéd (3rd), MTK Budapest (4th), Vasas (5th) and Csepel (6th), all ineligible because of Ferencváros also being from Budapest.
  - Greece: PAOK qualified instead of Olympiacos (3rd), ineligible because of AEK Athens also being from Athens.
3. West Germany, Italy, Yugoslavia and Poland: The following teams competed in the Inter-Cities Fairs Cup instead of other teams that would've had the first right to compete via their league position, and were not in breach of the 'one city, one team' rule. 'Fair trade' eligibility for the unqualified teams is unknown in some cases:
  - West Germany: Hamburg qualified instead of Borussia Dortmund (5th), which had played previously in the Fairs Cup.
  - Italy: Lazio qualified instead of Napoli (6th), which had competed in the Fairs Cup the previous season. Both Milan (4th) and Torino (7th) were ineligible because of Inter Milan and Juventus qualifying ahead of them.
  - Yugoslavia: Hajduk Split qualified instead of Velež (3rd).
  - Poland: GKS Katowice qualified instead of Polonia Bytom (4th), Zagłębie Sosnowiec (5th) and Gwardia Warsaw (6th).
4. Denmark: Newly promoted Brönshöj led the standings at the June break, but the team was not approved to compete by the Danish federation. It was replaced by AB, who was second at the time and couldn't qualify initially because the team was also based in Copenhagen.

== Schedule ==
The schedule of the competition was as follows. Matches were primarily scheduled for Wednesdays, though some matches took place on Tuesdays, and exceptionally on Thursdays. After the first leg of the final had to be postponed to a Friday, the return leg played in the following weekend was moved one day backwards to a Thursday. The first leg of the 1st round match-up between Sevilla FC and Eskisehirspor was played on a Saturday.

Schedule for 1970–71 Inter-Cities Fairs Cup
Round	First leg	Second leg
First round	2–23 September 1970	8–30 September 1970
Second round	14–28 October 1970	28 October – 4 November 1970
Third round	25 November – 9 December 1970	9–23 December 1970
Quarter-finals	27 January / 9–10 March 1971	17 February / 23–24 March 1971
Semi-finals	14 April 1971	28 April 1971
Final	26 May 1971	3 June 1971

== First round ==
Team 1	Agg.	Team 2	1st leg	2nd leg
Ilves-Kissat (Finland)	4–5	(Austria) Sturm Graz	4–2	0–3
Lazio (Italy)	2–4	(England) Arsenal	2–2	0–2
Cork Hibernians (Republic of Ireland)	1–6	(Spain) Valencia	0–3	1–3
Wiener Sportclub (Austria)	0–5	(Belgium) K.S.K. Beveren	0–2	0–3
B1901 (Denmark)	3–8	(West Germany) Hertha BSC	2–4	1–4
Spartak Trnava (Czechoslovakia)	2–2(4-3p)	(France) Olympique de Marseille	2–0	0–2 (a.e.t.)
Ruch Chorzów (Poland)	1–3	(Italy) Fiorentina	1–1	0–2
1. FC Köln (West Germany)	5–2	(France) RC Paris-Sedan	5–1	0–1
Internazionale (Italy)	1–3	(England) Newcastle United	1–1	0–2
Universitatea Craiova (Romania)	2–4	(Hungary) Pécsi Dózsa	2–1	0–3
GKS Katowice (Poland)	2–4	(Spain) Barcelona	0–1	2–3
Juventus (Italy)	11–0	(Luxembourg) US Rumelange	7–0	4–0
Barreirense (Portugal)	3–6	(Socialist Federal Republic of Yugoslavia) Dinamo Zagreb	2–0	1–6
La Gantoise (Belgium)	1–8	(West Germany) Hamburger SV	0–1	1–7
Sevilla (Spain)	2–3	(Turkey) Eskişehirspor	1–0	1–3
AEK Athens (Greece)	0–4	(Netherlands) Twente	0–1	0–3
Hibernian (Scotland)	9–2	(Sweden) Malmö FF	6–0	3–2
Vitória Guimarães (Portugal)	4–3	(France) Angoulême	3–0	1–3
Liverpool (England)	2–1	(Hungary) Ferencváros	1–0	1–1
Dinamo București (Romania)	5–1	(Greece) PAOK	5–0	0–1
Bayern Munich (West Germany)	2–1	(Scotland) Rangers	1–0	1–1
Botev Plovdiv (Bulgaria)	1–6	(England) Coventry City	1–4	0–2
Sparta Rotterdam (Netherlands)	15–0	(Iceland) ÍA	6–0	9–0
Coleraine (Northern Ireland)	4–3	(Scotland) Kilmarnock	1–1	3–2
Sarpsborg (Norway)	0–6	(England) Leeds United	0–1	0–5
Partizan (Socialist Federal Republic of Yugoslavia)	0–6	(East Germany) Dynamo Dresden	0–0	0–6
Sparta Prague (Czechoslovakia)	3–1	(Spain) Athletic Bilbao	2–0	1–1
Dundee United (Scotland)	3–2	(Switzerland) Grasshopper	3–2	0–0
AB (Denmark)	10–2	(Malta) Sliema Wanderers	7–0	3–2
Željezničar Sarajevo (Socialist Federal Republic of Yugoslavia)	7–9	(Belgium) Anderlecht	3–4	4–5
Lausanne Sports (Switzerland)	1–4	(Portugal) Vitória Setúbal	0–2	1–2
Hajduk Split (Socialist Federal Republic of Yugoslavia)	3–1	(Bulgaria) Slavia Sofia	3–0	0–1

=== First leg ===
2 September 1970
16:30

AEK Athens (Greece)	0–1	(Netherlands) Twente
	Report	R. van de Kerkhof 12'

Karaiskakis Stadium, Piraeus
Attendance: 26,124
Referee: Josip Strmečki (Yugoslavia)

2 September 1970

La Gantoise (Belgium)	0–1	(West Germany) Hamburger SV
	Report	Nogly 25'

Jules Ottenstadion, Ghent
Attendance: 10,900
Referee: Alistair McKenzie Scotland

2 September 1970

Željezničar Sarajevo (Socialist Federal Republic of Yugoslavia)	3–4	(Belgium) Anderlecht
Osim 4'; Sprečo 58'; Mujkić 59'	Report	Puis 34', 82'; Mulder 60'; Van Binst 89'

Asim Ferhatović Hase Stadium, Sarajevo
Attendance: 4,600
Referee: Günter Männig (East Germany)

5 September 1970
21:30

Sevilla (Spain)	1–0	(Turkey) Eskişehirspor
Matute 61'	Report

Ramón Sánchez Pizjuán Stadium, Seville
Attendance: 20,600
Referee: Jacques Colling (Luxembourg)

15 September 1970

Liverpool (England)	1–0	(Hungary) Ferencváros
Graham 17'	Report

Anfield, Liverpool
Attendance: 37,531
Referee: Roland Marendaz (Switzerland)

15 September 1970

Sarpsborg (Norway)	0–1	(England) Leeds United
	Report	Lorimer 77'

Sarpsborg Stadion, Sarpsborg
Attendance: 8,769
Referee: Preben Christopherson (Denmark)

15 September 1970

Coleraine (Northern Ireland)	1–1	(Scotland) Kilmarnock
Mullan 60'	Report	Mathie 56'

The Showgrounds, Coleraine
Attendance: 7,000
Referee: Kevin Howley (England)

15 September 1970

1. FC Köln (West Germany)	5–1	(France) RC Paris-Sedan
Parits 26'; Thielen 35'; Rupp 47', 70'; Lex 82'	Report	Pierron 69'

Müngersdorfer Stadion, Cologne
Attendance: 10,400
Referee: Leonardus van der Kroft (Netherlands)

15 September 1970

Lausanne Sports (Switzerland)	0–2	(Portugal) Vitória Setúbal
	Report	Baptista 61'; João 63'

Stade Olympique de la Pontaise, Lausanne
Attendance: 4,600
Referee: Robert Wurz (France)

15 September 1970

Dundee United (Scotland)	3–2	(Switzerland) Grasshopper
I. Reid 65'; Markland 81'; A. Reid 90'	Report	Ove Grahn 35'; Meier 50'

Tannadice Park, Dundee
Attendance: 8,400
Referee: Curt Nystrand (Sweden)

15 September 1970

Spartak Trnava (Czechoslovakia)	2–0	(France) Olympique de Marseille
Dobiaš 31' (pen.); Masrna 48'	Report

Spartak, Trnava
Attendance: 7,000
Referee: Aurel Bentu (Romania)

16 September 1970

AB (Denmark)	7–0	(Malta) Sliema Wanderers
Mick Sultana 9' (o.g.); F. Hansen 32', 89'; Carlsen 48', 72'; Nielsen 53'; Petersen 86'	Report

Københavns Idrætspark, Copenhagen
Attendance: 1,960
Referee: Sven Jonsson (Sweden)

16 September 1970
17:00

GKS Katowice (Poland)	0–1	(Spain) Barcelona
	Report	Rexach 83'

Stadion Śląski, Chorzów
Attendance: 85,000
Referee: Karl Riegg (West Germany)

16 September 1970

Lazio (Italy)	2–2	(England) Arsenal
Chinaglia 85', 89' (pen.)	Report	Radford 52', 56'

Stadio Olimpico, Rome
Attendance: 31,000
Referee: Gerhard Schulenburg (West Germany)

16 September 1970
17:30

Cork Hibernians (Republic of Ireland)	0–3	(Spain) Valencia
	Report	Claramunt 13', 22'; Barrachina 75'

Flower Lodge, Cork
Attendance: 10,500
Referee: Alfred Delcourt (Belgium)

16 September 1970

Partizan (Socialist Federal Republic of Yugoslavia)	0–0	(East Germany) Dynamo Dresden
	Report

JNA, Belgrade
Attendance: 9,600
Referee: Franz Wöhrer (Austria)

16 September 1970

Wiener Sportclub (Austria)	0–2	(Belgium) K.S.K. Beveren
	Report	Rogiers 58'; Janssens 74'

Sportclub-Platz, Vienna
Attendance: 1,200
Referee: Gusztáv Bircsak (Hungary)

16 September 1970

Bayern Munich (West Germany)	1–0	(Scotland) Rangers
Beckenbauer 21'	Report

Grünwalder Stadion, Munich
Attendance: 23,000
Referee: Arie Van Gemert (Netherlands)

16 September 1970
18:30

Sparta Prague (Czechoslovakia)	2–0	(Spain) Athletic Bilbao
Migas 19' (pen.); Gögh 61'	Report

Stadion Letná, Prague
Attendance: 16,400
Referee: Georgios Gianopoulos (Greece)

16 September 1970

Barreirense (Portugal)	2–0	(Socialist Federal Republic of Yugoslavia) Dinamo Zagreb
Serafim 30'; Câmpora 89'	Report

Estádio Dr. Manuel de Mello, Barreiro
Attendance: 4,700
Referee: Georges Uhlen (France)

16 September 1970

B1901 (Denmark)	2–4	(West Germany) Hertha BSC
Olsen 25'; H. E. Hansen 78'	Report	Brungs 19', 28'; Gayer 68'; Steffenhagen 70'

Nykøbing Falster Idrætspark, Nykøbing Falster
Attendance: 8,000
Referee: Kjell Wahlen (Norway)

16 September 1970

Ilves-Kissat (Finland)	4–2	(Austria) Sturm Graz
Lundberg 3'; Nuoranen 40', 47'; Kalevi Nupponen 53'	Report	Rinne 2' (o.g.); Kaiser 54'

Ratina Stadium, Tampere
Attendance: 300
Referee: Marian Kuston (Poland)

16 September 1970

Vitória Guimarães (Portugal)	3–0	(France) Angoulême
B. da Velha 46', 82'; Peres 55'	Report

Estádio D. Afonso Henriques, Guimarães
Attendance: 5,500
Referee: Ettore Carminati (Italy)

16 September 1970

Hibernian (Scotland)	6–0	(Sweden) Malmö FF
Blair 31'; Joe McBride 33', 57', 59'; A. Duncan 62', 75'	Report

Easter Road, Edinburgh
Attendance: 11,165
Referee: Pablo Sánchez Ibáñez (Spain)

16 September 1970

Ruch Chorzów (Poland)	1–1	(Italy) Fiorentina
E. Faber 46'	Report	Vitali 53'

Stadion Śląski, Chorzów
Attendance: 85,000
Referee: Josef Bucek (Austria)

16 September 1970

Botev Plovdiv (Bulgaria)	1–4	(England) Coventry City
Radkov 75'	Report	O'Rourke 39', 67', 89'; Neil Martin 43'

9 September, Plovdiv
Attendance: 10,400
Referee: Joseph Cassar Naudi (Malta)

16 September 1970

Universitatea Craiova (Romania)	2-1	(Hungary) Pécsi Dózsa
Ţarălungă 68'; Strâmbeanu 80'	Report	Máté 67'

Stadionul Central, Craiova
Attendance: 15,000
Referee: Efstathios Papavasiliou (Greece)

16 September 1970

Juventus (Italy)	7–0	(Luxembourg) US Rumelange
Pawlowski 9' (o.g.); Bettega 15', 74'; Anastasi 19', 27', 43', 70'	Report

Stadio Comunale, Turin
Attendance: 10,700
Referee: Karl Göppel (Switzerland)

16 September 1970

Dinamo București (Romania)	5–0	(Greece) PAOK
Dumitrache 8', 49', 73'; Popescu 64', 83'	Report

Stadionul 23 August, Bucharest
Attendance: 20,000
Referee: Sándor Petri (Hungary)

16 September 1970

Hajduk Split (Socialist Federal Republic of Yugoslavia)	3-0	(Bulgaria) Slavia Sofia
Jerković 22'; Pavlica 39'; Jovanić 89'	Report

Plinara Stadion, Split
Attendance: 6,600
Referee: László Vízhányó (Hungary)

23 September 1970

Sparta Rotterdam (Netherlands)	6-0	(Iceland) ÍA
Venneker 2'; Kowalik 11'; Koudijzer 44'; Heijerman 48', 57' (pen.); Walbeek 87'	Report

De Kuip, Rotterdam
Attendance: 8,000
Referee: David W. Smith (England)

23 September 1970

Internazionale (Italy)	1–1	(England) Newcastle United
Cella 84'	Report	Davies 44'

San Siro, Milan
Attendance: 14,460
Referee: Heinz Siebert (West Germany)

=== Second leg ===
8 September 1970
20:00

Twente (Netherlands)	3–0	(Greece) AEK Athens
Pahlplatz 37', 50'; R. van de Kerkhof 43'	Report

Diekman Stadion, Enschede
Attendance: 16,000
Referee: Ken Burns (England)

Twente won 4–0 on aggregate.

15 September 1970

Hamburger SV (West Germany)	7-1	(Belgium) La Gantoise
Dörfel 3', 22', 59', 61'; Hönig 26'; Zaczyk 57' (pen.); Volkert 84'		Benedito 89'

Hamburg won 8-1 on aggregate.

16 September 1970

Anderlecht (Belgium)	5-4	(Socialist Federal Republic of Yugoslavia) Željezničar Sarajevo
Ejderstedt 11', 61', 75'; Van Himst 23'; Puis 55'		Bukal 20', 25'; Sprečo 36', 60'

Anderlecht won 9-7 on aggregate.

16 September 1970
15:00

Eskişehirspor (Turkey)	3–1	(Spain) Sevilla
Fethi 80', 82', 90+'		Acosta 79'

Eskişehir Atatürk Stadium, Eskişehir
Attendance: 10,700
Referee: Gerhard Kunze (West Germany)

Eskişehirspor won 3–2 on aggregate.

23 September 1970
22:30

Barcelona (Spain)	3–2	(Poland) GKS Katowice
Pujol 50'; Martí Filosia 59'; Rexach 82'		Rother 9'; Nowok 41' (pen.)

Camp Nou, Barcelona
Attendance: 60,000
Referee: René Vigliani (France)

Barcelona won 4–2 on aggregate.

23 September 1970

Arsenal (England)	2–0	(Italy) Lazio
Radford 11'; Armstrong 73'

Highbury, London
Referee: Rudolf Glöckner (East Germany)

Arsenal won 4–2 on aggregate.

26 September 1970

Ferencvaros (Hungary)	1–1	(England) Liverpool
Mucha 47'		Hughes 65'

Liverpool won 2-1 on aggregate.

30 September 1970

Fiorentina (Italy)	2–0	(Poland) Ruch Chorzów
Chiarugi 42'; Mariani 47'

Stadio Comunale, Florence
Referee: Petar Kostovski (Yugoslavia)

Fiorentina won 3–1 on aggregate.

29 September 1970

Kilmarnock (Scotland)	2-3	(Northern Ireland) Coleraine
McLean 16'; Morrison 22'		Dickson 48', 52', 60'

Coleraine won 4-3 on aggregate.

29 September 1970

Valencia (Spain)	3–1	(Republic of Ireland) Cork Hibernians
Jara 12'; Sergio 19', 47'		Wigginton 40'

Estadio Luis Casanova, Valencia
Attendance: 12,000
Referee: David W. Smith (England)

Valencia won 6–1 on aggregate.

29 September 1970

Leeds United (England)	5–0	(Norway) Sarpsborg
Charlton 22', 61'; Bremner 71', 88'; Lorimer 90'

Elland Road, Leeds
Attendance: 19,283
Referee: Mario Gomez Alves (Portugal)

Leeds won 6–0 on aggregate.

29 September 1970

ÍA (Iceland)	0-9	(Netherlands) Sparta Rotterdam
	Report	Jan Klijnjan 24', 31', 74'; Jørgen Kristensen 29'; Janusz Kowalik 32', 61', 65'; Jan van der Veen 34'; Hans Venneker 82'

Zuiderpark Stadion, The Hague
Attendance: 1,800
Referee: (England) Keith Walker

Sparta Rotterdam won 15–0 on aggregate.

29 September 1970

CS Sedan (France)	1–0	(West Germany) FC Köln
Dellamore 87' (pen.)

Koln won 5-2 on aggregate

30 September 1970

Hertha BSC (West Germany)	4-1	(Denmark) B1901
Horr 81'; Brungs 55', 80'; Gergely 87'		Rasmussen 31'

Hertha Berlin won 8-3 on aggregate

30 September 1970

Newcastle United (England)	2–0	(Italy) Internazionale
Moncur 29'; Davies 70'

Newcastle upon Tyne

Newcastle United won 3–1 on aggregate.

30 September 1970

Pécsi Dózsa (Hungary)	3–0	(Romania) Universitatea Craiova
Kocsis 16', 25'; Máté 22'	Report

Stadion PVSK, Pécs
Attendance: 18,000
Referee: Walter Fercher (Austria)

Pécsi won 4–2 on aggregate.

30 September 1970

Sturm Graz (Austria)	3-0	(Finland) Ilves
Murlasits 13'; Albrecht 32'; Kaiser 49'

Graz won 5-4 on aggregate.

30 September 1970
19:45

Athletic Bilbao (Spain)	1–1	(Czechoslovakia) Sparta Prague
Uriarte 65' (pen.)		Chovanec 53'

Estadio San Mamés, Bilbao
Attendance: 29,300
Referee: Clive Thomas (Wales)

Sparta Prague won 3–1 on aggregate.

30 September 1970

Grasshopper (Switzerland)	0–0	(Scotland) Dundee United
	Report

Hardturm, Zürich
Attendance: 4,500
Referee: Franz Geluck (Belgium)

Dundee United won 3–2 on aggregate.

30 September 1970

US Rumelange (Luxembourg)	0–4	(Italy) Juventus
		Novellini 30', 44', 87'; Landini 37'

Rumelange

Juventus won 11–0 on aggregate.

30 September 1970

PAOK (Greece)	1–0	(Romania) Dinamo București
Koudas 80'	Report

Toumba Stadium, Thessaloniki
Attendance: 12,400
Referee: Sergio Gonella (Italy)

Dinamo București won 5–1 on aggregate.

30 September 1970

Coventry City (England)	2–0	(Bulgaria) Botev Plovdiv
Joicey 30'; Blockley 35'

Coventry

Coventry City won 6–1 on aggregate.

30 September 1970

Vitória Setúbal (Portugal)	2–1	(Switzerland) Lausanne-Sport
José Maria 21', 45'		Dufour 40'

Estádio do Bonfim, Setúbal
Attendance: 8,300
Referee: Antonio Sánchez Ríos (Spain)

Vitória Setúbal won 4–1 on aggregate.

30 September 1970

Angoulême (France)	3–1	(Portugal) Vitória Guimarães
Castellan 25', 39'; Gallice 67'		Ademir Silva 51'

Stade Camille-Lebon, Angoulême)
Attendance: 6,300
Referee: John Carpenter (Republic of Ireland)

Vitória Guimarães won 4–3 on aggregate.

30 September 1970

Dinamo Zagreb (Socialist Federal Republic of Yugoslavia)	6–1	(Portugal) Barreirense
Novak 50', 55', 70', 84'; Lalić 72', 75'		Campora 38'

Stadion Maksimir, Zagreb
Attendance: 9,300
Referee: Helmut Bader (East Germany)

Dinamo Zagreb won 6–3 on aggregate.

30 September 1970

Kilmarnock (Scotland)	2–3	(Northern Ireland) Coleraine
	Report	Des Dickson

Rugby Park, Kilmarnock

Coleraine won 4–3 on aggregate.

1 October 1970
15:00

Malmö (Sweden)	3–1	(Scotland) Hibernian
Larsson 23'; Jönsson 79'		Duncan 46'; McEwan 77'; Stanton 85'

Eleda Stadion, Malmö
Attendance: 1,900
Referee: Koen Brouwer Jr. (Netherlands)

Hibernian won 9–2 on aggregate.

== Second round ==
Team 1	Agg.	Team 2	1st leg	2nd leg
SK Sturm Graz (Austria)	1–2	(England) Arsenal	1–0	0–2
Valencia CF (Spain)	1–2	(Belgium) K.S.K. Beveren	0–1	1–1
Hertha BSC (West Germany)	2–3	(Czechoslovakia) FC Spartak Trnava	1–0	1–3
Fiorentina (Italy)	1–3	(West Germany) 1. FC Köln	1–2	0–1
Newcastle United (England)	2–2(3-5p)	(Hungary) Pécsi Dózsa	2–0	0–2 (a.e.t.)
Barcelona (Spain)	2–4	(Italy) Juventus	1–2	1–2
NK Dinamo Zagreb (Socialist Federal Republic of Yugoslavia)	4–1	(West Germany) Hamburger SV	4–0	0–1
Eskişehirspor (Turkey)	4–8	(Netherlands) Twente	3–2	1–6
Hibernian (Scotland)	3–2	(Portugal) Vitória Guimarães	2–0	1–2
Liverpool (England)	4–1	(Romania) FC Dinamo București	3–0	1–1
Bayern Munich (West Germany)	7–3	(England) Coventry City	6–1	1–2
Sparta Rotterdam (Netherlands)	4–1	(Northern Ireland) Coleraine	2–0	2–1
Leeds United (England)	2–2a	(East Germany) Dynamo Dresden	1–0	1–2
Sparta Prague (Czechoslovakia)	3–2	(Scotland) Dundee United FC	3–1	0–1
AB (Denmark)	1–7	(Belgium) Anderlecht	1–3	0–4
Vitória Setúbal (Portugal)	3–2	(Socialist Federal Republic of Yugoslavia) Hajduk Split	2–0	1–2

=== First leg ===
14 October 1970

Hibernian (Scotland)	2–0	(Portugal) Vitória Guimarães
Duncan 45'; Stanton 90'

Easter Road, Edinburgh
Attendance: 11,400
Referee: Theodorus Boosten (Netherlands)

20 October 1970

Fiorentina (Italy)	1–2	(West Germany) 1. FC Köln
Mariani 20'		Flohe 25', 46'

Florence
Attendance: 10,000
Referee: Anton Bucheli (Switzerland)

20 October 1970
20:45

Barcelona (Spain)	1–2	(Italy) Juventus
Marcial 74'		Haller 12'; Bettega 55'

Camp Nou, Barcelona
Attendance: 65,000
Referee: Jack Taylor (England)

20 October 1970

Sparta Rotterdam (Netherlands)	2-0	(Northern Ireland) Coleraine F.C.
Jan Klijnjan 19', 44'	Report

De Kuip, Rotterdam
Attendance: 7,000
Referee: (Luxembourg) Antoine Queudeville

21 October 1970

Liverpool (England)	3–0	(Romania) Dinamo București
Lindsay 60'; Lawler 76'; Hughes 83'	Report

Anfield, Liverpool
Attendance: 36,525
Referee: Roger Machin (France)

21 October 1970

Leeds United (England)	1–0	(East Germany) Dynamo Dresden
Lorimer 57' (pen.)

Elland Road, Leeds
Attendance: 21,292
Referee: Alfred Delcourt (Belgium)

21 October 1970

Sparta Prague (Czechoslovakia)	3–1	(Scotland) Dundee United
Vrána 19'; Jurkanin 71', 89'		Traynor 25'

Stadion Letná, Prague
Attendance: 17,600
Referee: Doğan Babacan (Turkey)

21 October 1970

Vitória Setúbal (Portugal)	2–0	(Socialist Federal Republic of Yugoslavia) Hajduk Split
José Maria 59'; Boljat 82' (o.g.)

Estádio do Bonfim, Setúbal
Attendance: 6,900
Referee: Alfred Ott (West Germany)

21 October 1970

Newcastle United (England)	2–0	(Hungary) Pécsi Dózsa
Davies 44', 58'	Report

St James' Park, Newcastle upon Tyne
Attendance: 50,550
Referee: Hans-Joachim Weyland (West Germany)

22 October 1970
20:00

Valencia (Spain)	0–1	(Belgium) K.S.K. Beveren
		De Raeymaeker 77'

Estadio Luis Casanova, Valencia
Attendance: 45,000
Referee: Robert Wurtz (France)

28 October 1970

Eskişehirspor (Turkey)	3–2	(Netherlands) FC Twente
Halil Güngördü 40'; Fethi Heper 44', 90'	Report	Theo Pahlplatz 71'; W. van de Kerkhof 86'

Eskişehir Atatürk Stadium, Eskişehir
Attendance: 22,000
Referee: Marijan Raus (Yugoslavia)

=== Second leg ===
28 October 1970

Vitória Guimarães (Portugal)	2–1	(Scotland) Hibernian
Gonçalves 20'; Ademir Silva 43'		Graham 75'

Estádio D. Afonso Henriques, Guimarães
Attendance: 5,700
Referee: Sergio Gonella (Italy)

Hibernian won 3–2 on aggregate.

4 November 1970

Dynamo Dresden (East Germany)	2–1	(England) Leeds United
Hemp 15'; Kreische 63'		Jones 30'

Rudolf Harbig Stadion, Dresden
Attendance: 35,000
Referee: Ferdinand Marschall (Austria)

2–2 on aggregate; Leeds United won on away goals.

3 November 1970

1. FC Köln (West Germany)	1–0	(Italy) Fiorentina
Biskup 33' (pen.)

Cologne
Attendance: 14,000

1. FC Köln won 3–1 on aggregate.

4 November 1970
14:30

Juventus (Italy)	2–1	(Spain) Barcelona
Bettega 5'; Capello 23'		Pujol 83'

Stadio Comunale, Turin
Attendance: 40,000
Referee: Günter Männig (East Germany)

Juventus won 4–2 on aggregate.

4 November 1970

Dinamo București (Romania)	1–1	(England) Liverpool
Sălceanu 34'	Report	Boersma 48'

Stadionul 23 August, Bucharest
Attendance: 50,000
Referee: Erich Linemayr (Austria)

Liverpool won 4–1 on aggregate.

4 November 1970
20:00

K.S.K. Beveren (Belgium)	1–1	(Spain) Valencia
De Raeymaeker 60'		Forment 84'

Olympisch Stadion, Antwerp
Attendance: 20,000
Referee: Curt Nystrand (Sweden)

The referee called the end of the game three minutes before the regulation time and had to abandon the pitch escorted out by Beveren's players because of the pressure and the protests by the visiting team as a result of his decision. K.S.K. Beveren won 2–1 on aggregate.

4 November 1970

Dundee United (Scotland)	1–0	(Czechoslovakia) Sparta Prague
Gordon 31'	Report

Tannadice Park, Dundee
Attendance: 9,000
Referee: Kjell Wahlen (Norway)

Sparta Prague won 3–2 on aggregate.

4 November 1970

Coleraine F.C. (Northern Ireland)	1-2	(Netherlands) Sparta Rotterdam
Brian Jennings 28'	Report	Jan Klijnjan 15'; Jørgen Kristensen 26'

Coleraine Showgrounds, Coleraine
Attendance: 5,000
Referee: Kaj Sørensen (Denmark)

Sparta Rotterdam won 4–1 on aggregate.

4 November 1970

FC Twente (Netherlands)	6–1	(Turkey) Eskişehirspor
Jan Jeuring 2', 12', 60'; R. van de Kerkhof 44'; Jan Streuer 85'; Antal Nagy 88'	Report	Fethi Heper 26'

Diekman Stadion, Enschede
Attendance: 24,500
Referee: Rudi Glöckner (West Germany)

Twente won 8–4 on aggregate.

4 November 1970

Hajduk Split (Socialist Federal Republic of Yugoslavia)	2–1	(Portugal) Vitória Setúbal
Nadoveza 63'; Buljan 72'		José Maria 23'

Stadion Stari plac, Split
Attendance: 11,800
Referee: Jan Łazowski (Poland)

Vitória Setúbal won 3–2 on aggregate.

4 November 1970

Pécsi Dózsa (Hungary)	2–0	(England) Newcastle United
Moncur 18' (o.g.); Máté 82'	Report
Penalties
Konrád (penalty scored); Daka (penalty scored); Tüske (penalty scored); Dunai (penalty scored); Kincses (penalty scored)	5–2	(penalty missed) Robson; (penalty missed) Mitchel; (penalty missed) Gibb; (penalty scored) Clark; (penalty scored) McFaul

PMFC, Pécs
Attendance: 25,000
Referee: Roland Marendaz (Switzerland)

== Third round ==
Team 1	Agg.	Team 2	1st leg	2nd leg
Arsenal (England)	4–0	(Belgium) K.S.K. Beveren	4–0	0–0
FC Spartak Trnava (Czechoslovakia)	0–4	(West Germany) 1. FC Köln	0–1	0–3
Pécsi Dózsa (Hungary)	0–3	(Italy) Juventus	0–1	0–2
NK Dinamo Zagreb (Socialist Federal Republic of Yugoslavia)	2–3	(Netherlands) Twente	2–2	0–1
Hibernian (Scotland)	0–3	(England) Liverpool	0–1	0–2
Bayern Munich (West Germany)	5–2	(Netherlands) Sparta Rotterdam	2–1	3–1
Leeds United (England)	9–2	(Czechoslovakia) Sparta Prague	6–0	3–2
Anderlecht (Belgium)	3–4	(Portugal) Vitória Setúbal	2–1	1–3 (a.e.t.)

=== First leg ===
25 November 1970

FC Bayern Munich (Germany)	2–1	(Netherlands) Sparta Rotterdam
Edgar Schneider 56'; Gerd Müller 88'	Report	Nol Heijerman 16'

Grünwalder Stadion, Munich
Attendance: 10,300
Referee: José Rosa Nunes (Portugal)

25 November 1970

Spartak Trnava (Czechoslovakia)	0–1	(Germany) 1. FC Köln
	Report	Dobiaš 8' (o.g.)

Anton Malatinský Stadium, Trnava
Attendance: 13,000
Referee: Nikola Mladenović (Yugoslavia)

2 December 1970

Leeds United (England)	6–0	(Czechoslovakia) Sparta Prague
Clarke 19'; Chovanec 24' (o.g.); Bremner 26'; Gray 28', 36'; Charlton 54'	Report

Elland Road, Leeds
Attendance: 25,843
Referee: Keon Brouwer (Netherlands)

2 December 1970

Arsenal (England)	4–0	(Belgium) Beveren
Clarke 10'; Kennedy 29', 77'; Sammels 54'	Report

Highbury, London
Attendance: 33,444
Referee: Pius Kamber (Netherlands)

3 December 1970

Pécsi Dózsa (Hungary)	0–1	(Italy) Juventus
	Report	Causio 31'

PVSK Stadium, Pécs
Attendance: 22,000
Referee: Ferdinand Biwersi (West Germany)

9 December 1970

GNK Dinamo Zagreb (Socialist Federal Republic of Yugoslavia)	2–2	(Netherlands) FC Twente
Gucmirtl 17', 36'	Report	Pahlplatz 37'; R. van de Kerkhof 89'

Stadion Maksimir, Zagreb
Attendance: 15,000
Referee: Joseph Bucek (Austria)

9 December 1970

Hibernian (Scotland)	0–1	(England) Liverpool
	Report	Toshack 75'

Easter Road, Edinburgh
Attendance: 30,296
Referee: Rudi Glöckner (West Germany)

9 December 1970

Anderlecht (Belgium)	2–1	(Portugal) Vitória Setúbal
Ejderstedt 9'; Mulder 66'		Wágner Canotilho 32'

Stade Émile Versé, Brussels
Attendance: 16,200
Referee: John Paterson (Scotland)

=== Second leg ===
9 December 1970

Sparta Rotterdam (Netherlands)	1-3	(Germany) FC Bayern Munich
Jørgen Kristensen 32'	Report	Gerd Müller 23', 40', 66'

De Kuip, Rotterdam
Attendance: 45,000
Referee: Antonio Camacho Jimenez (Spain)

Bayern Munich won 5–2 on aggregate.

16 December 1970

Juventus (Italy)	2–0	(Hungary) Pécsi Dózsa
Anastasi 85', 87'

Turin

Juventus won 3–0 on aggregate.

9 December 1970

Sparta Prague (Czechoslovakia)	2–3	(England) Leeds United
Barton 65'; Urban 80'		Gray 12'; Clarke 32'; Belfitt 35'

Letna Stadium, Prague
Attendance: 30,000
Referee: Aurelio Angonese (Italy)

Leeds won 9–2 on aggregate.

16 December 1970

FC Twente (Netherlands)	1–0	(Socialist Federal Republic of Yugoslavia) GNK Dinamo Zagreb
Jan Jeuring 21'	Report

Diekman Stadion, Enschede
Attendance: 24,500
Referee: Danny Lyden (England)

Twente won 3–2 on aggregate.

23 December 1970

Vitória Setúbal (Portugal)	3–1 (a.e.t.)	(Belgium) Anderlecht
Guerreiro 24', 120'; Baptista 70'		Desanghere 52'

Estádio do Bonfim, Setúbal
Attendance: 14,300
Referee: Robert Frauciel (France)

Vitória Setúbal won 4–3 on aggregate.

== Quarter-finals ==
Team 1	Agg.	Team 2	1st leg	2nd leg
Arsenal (England)	2–2a	(West Germany) 1. FC Köln	2–1	0–1
Juventus (Italy)	4–2	(Netherlands) Twente	2–0	2–2 (a.e.t.)
Liverpool (England)	4–1	(West Germany) Bayern Munich	3–0	1–1
Leeds United (England)	3–2	(Portugal) Vitória Setúbal	2–1	1–1

=== First leg ===
27 January 1971

Juventus (Italy)	2–0	(Netherlands) Twente
Haller 8'; Novellini 80'	Report

Stadio Comunale, Turin
Attendance: 14,200
Referee: José María Ortiz de Mendíbil (Spain)

9 March 1971

Arsenal (England)	2–1	(West Germany) 1. FC Köln
McLintock 24'; Storey 69'	Report	Thielen 44'

Highbury, London
Attendance: 40,007
Referee: István Zsolt (Hungary)

10 March 1971

Leeds United (England)	2–1	(Portugal) Vitória Setúbal
Lorimer 19'; Giles 75' (pen.)	Report	Baptista 2'

Elland Road, Leeds
Attendance: 27,143
Referee: Günther Männig (East Germany)

10 March 1971

Liverpool (England)	3–0	(West Germany) Bayern Munich
A. Evans 30', 50', 73'	Report

Anfield, Liverpool
Attendance: 45,616
Referee: Franz Geluck (Belgium)

=== Second leg ===
17 February 1971

Twente (Netherlands)	2–2 (a.e.t.)	(Italy) Juventus
Pahlplatz 11'; Drost 49'	Report	Anastasi 96', 98'

Diekman Stadion, Enschede
Attendance: 22,800
Referee: Erich Linemayr (Austria)

Juventus won 4–2 on aggregate.

24 March 1971

Vitória Setúbal (Portugal)	1–1	(England) Leeds United
Baptista 84'	Report	Lorimer 17'

Estadio do Bonfim, Setúbal
Attendance: 30,000
Referee: Roland Marendaz (Switzerland)

Leeds won 3–2 on aggregate.

23 March 1971

(West Germany) 1. FC Köln	1–0	(England) Arsenal
Biskup 4' (pen.)	Report

Müngersdorfer Stadion, Cologne
Attendance: 46,200
Referee: Constantin Petrea (Romania)

2–2 on aggregate; 1. FC Köln won on away goals.

24 March 1971

(West Germany) Bayern Munich	1–1	(England) Liverpool
Schneider 77'	Report	Ross 74'

Grünwalder Stadion, Munich
Attendance: 22,000
Referee: Robert Wurtz (France)

Liverpool won 4–1 on aggregate.

== Semi-finals ==
Team 1	Agg.	Team 2	1st leg	2nd leg
1. FC Köln (West Germany)	1–3	(Italy) Juventus	1–1	0–2
Liverpool (England)	0–1	(England) Leeds United	0–1	0–0

=== First leg ===
14 April 1971

1. FC Köln (West Germany)	1–1	(Italy) Juventus
Thielen 87'	Report	Bettega 37'

Müngersdorfer Stadion, Cologne
Attendance: 50,500
Referee: Anton Bucheli (Switzerland)

14 April 1971

Liverpool (England)	0–1	(England) Leeds United
	Report	Bremner 67'

Anfield, Liverpool
Attendance: 52,577
Referee: Jef Dorpmans (Netherlands)

=== Second leg ===
28 April 1971

Juventus (Italy)	2–0	(West Germany) 1. FC Köln
Capello 2'; Anastasi 84'	Report

Stadio Comunale, Turin
Attendance: 64,738
Referee: Roger Machin (France)

Juventus won 3–1 on aggregate.

28 April 1971

Leeds United (England)	0–0	(England) Liverpool
	Report

Elland Road, Leeds
Attendance: 40,462
Referee: Tom Wharton (Scotland)

Leeds won 1–0 on aggregate.

== Final ==
=== First leg ===
26 May 1971

Juventus (Italy)	0–0	(England) Leeds United

Stadio Comunale, Turin
Attendance: 46,342
Referee: Laurens van Ravens (Netherlands)

Game abandoned in the 51st minute due to heavy rain and waterlogged pitch.

==== Replay ====
28 May 1971
21:00 CEST

Juventus (Italy)	2–2	(England) Leeds United
Bettega 27'; Capello 55'	Report	Madeley 48'; Bates 77'

Stadio Comunale, Turin
Attendance: 58,555
Referee: Laurens van Ravens (Netherlands)

=== Second leg ===
3 June 1971
18:30 UTC

Leeds United (England)	1–1	(Italy) Juventus
Clarke 12'	Report	Anastasi 20'

Elland Road, Leeds
Attendance: 42,483
Referee: Rudi Glöckner (East Germany)

3–3 on aggregate; Leeds United won on away goals.
