= Sparta Rotterdam in European football =

Sparta Rotterdam in European Football includes the games which are played by Sparta Rotterdam in competitions organized by UEFA.

== Totals ==
Note: (Note: Intertoto Cup was founded first in 1961–62, but was only taken over by UEFA in 1995. Therefore the results of Intertoto Cup before the year 1995 are excluded from the statistics.)

Competition	Participations	Games	Won	Draw	Lost	Goals scored	Goals conceded
Champions League (Note: European Cup is accepted as Champions League.)	1	6	3	0	3	12	11
UEFA Cup Winners' Cup	3	10	4	3	3	17	12
Inter-Cities Fairs Cup	1	6	4	0	2	21	7
UEFA Cup	2	10	3	4	3	14	15
Total	7	32	14	7	11	64	45

== Top scorers ==
Note: (Note: Intertoto Cup was founded first in 1961–62, but was only taken over by UEFA in 1995. Therefore the results of Intertoto Cup before the year 1995 are excluded from the statistics.)

#	Goals	Name	Last score	Tournament
1	6	(Netherlands) Jan Klijnjan	4 Nov 1970	Inter-Cities Fairs Cup
2	5	(Poland) Janusz Kowalik	29 Sep 1971	Cup Winners' Cup
3	4	(Netherlands) Henk Bosveld	4 Nov 1971	Cup Winners' Cup
3	4	(Netherlands) Joop Daniëls	25 Nov 1959	European Cup
3	4	(Denmark) Jørgen Kristensen	29 Sep 1971	Cup Winners' Cup
3	4	(Netherlands) Ronald Lengkeek	2 Oct 1985	UEFA Cup
7	3	(England) Carl Wilson	3 Oct 1962	Cup Winners' Cup
7	3	(Netherlands) Edwin Olde Riekerink	23 Oct 1985	UEFA Cup
7	3	(Netherlands) Nol Heijerman	25 Nov 1970	Inter-Cities Fairs Cup
7	3	(Netherlands) Tom Kemper	5 Oct 1965	Cup Winners' Cup

== Competitions by Countries ==
Note: (Note: Intertoto Cup was founded first in 1961–62, but was only taken over by UEFA in 1995. Therefore the results of Intertoto Cup before the year 1995 are excluded from the statistics.)

	Country	Games	Won	Draw	Lost	Goals Scored	Goals Against	Opponents
1	Germany (Note: Including the teams of East Germany.)	8	2	2	4	10	16	Borussia Mönchengladbach (2), FC Bayern Munich (2), FC Carl Zeiss Jena (2), Hamburger SV (2)
2	Northern Ireland	4	3	1	0	9	2	Coleraine F.C. (4)
2	Switzerland	4	2	0	2	5	7	FC Lausanne-Sport (2), Servette FC (2)
4	Scotland	3	1	0	2	5	6	Rangers F.C. (3)
4	Sweden	3	2	0	1	7	5	IFK Göteborg (3)
6	Bulgaria	2	1	1	0	3	1	PFC Levski Sofia (2)
6	Iceland	2	2	0	0	15	1	Íþróttabandalag Akraness (2)
6	Malta	2	1	1	0	7	1	Floriana F.C. (2)
6	Russia	2	0	1	1	1	3	FC Spartak Moscow (2)
6	Serbia (Note: Including the team of Yugoslavia.)	2	0	1	1	2	3	Red Star Belgrade (2)

== Most Played Teams ==
Note: (Note: Intertoto Cup was founded first in 1961–62, but was only taken over by UEFA in 1995. Therefore the results of Intertoto Cup before the year 1995 are excluded from the statistics.)

Rank	Team	Games	Won	Draw	Lost	Goals Scored	Goals Against
1	(Northern Ireland) Coleraine F.C.	4	3	1	0	9	2
2	(Sweden) IFK Göteborg	3	2	0	1	7	5
2	(Scotland) Rangers F.C.	3	1	0	2	5	6

== European match history ==
As of 19 November 2023

Season	Round	Opponent	Home	Away	Aggregate
1959–60 European Cup	1st round	(Sweden) IFK Göteborg	4–0	1–3	4–4 (Note: Sparta won 3–1 in the replay played in Bremen, Germany.) (3–1 (replay, a.e.t.))
1959–60 European Cup	Quarter finals	(Scotland) Rangers F.C.	2–3	1–0	3–3 (Note: Rangers won 3–2 in the replay played in London, England.) (3–2 (replay, a.e.t.))
1962–63 Cup Winners' Cup	1st round	(Switzerland) FC Lausanne-Sport	4–2	0–3	4–5
1966–67 Cup Winners' Cup	1st round	(Malta) Floriana F.C.	6–0	1–1	7–1
1966–67 Cup Winners' Cup	2nd round	(Switzerland) Servette FC	1–0	0–2	1–2
1970–71 Inter-Cities Fairs Cup	1st round	(Iceland) Íþróttabandalag Akraness	6–0	9–0	15–0
1970–71 Inter-Cities Fairs Cup	2nd round	(Northern Ireland) Coleraine F.C.	2–0	2–1	4–1
1970–71 Inter-Cities Fairs Cup	Quarter final	(Germany) FC Bayern Munich	1–3	1–2	2–5
1971–72 Cup Winners' Cup	1st round	(Bulgaria) PFC Levski Sofia	2–0	1–1	3–1
1971–72 Cup Winners' Cup	2nd round	(Socialist Federal Republic of Yugoslavia) Red Star Belgrade	1–1	1–2	2–3
1983–84 UEFA Cup	1st round	(Northern Ireland) Coleraine F.C.	4–0	1–1	5–1
1983–84 UEFA Cup	2nd round	(East Germany) FC Carl Zeiss Jena	3–2	1–1	4–3
1983–84 UEFA Cup	3rd round	(Soviet Union) FC Spartak Moscow	1–1	0–2	1–3
1985–86 UEFA Cup	1st round	(Germany) Hamburger SV	2–0	0–2	2–2 (4–3 p)
1985–86 UEFA Cup	2nd round	(Germany) Borussia Mönchengladbach	1–1	1–5	2–6

=== Intertoto Cup Results ===
Note: (Note: Intertoto Cup was founded first in 1961–62, but was only taken over by UEFA in 1995. Therefore the results of Intertoto Cup before the year 1995 are excluded from the statistics.)

As of 19 November 2023

Season	Round	Opponent	Home	Away	Aggregate
1961–62 Intertoto Cup	Group stage	(Switzerland) FC Basel	5–2	4–0	1st
1961–62 Intertoto Cup	Group stage	(Germany) SV Tasmania Berlin	4–1	1–4	1st
1961–62 Intertoto Cup	Group stage	(Sweden) IF Elfsborg	4–3	5–2	1st
1961–62 Intertoto Cup	Quarter final	(Czechoslovakia) ŠK Slovan Bratislava	1–6		
1963–64 Intertoto Cup	Group stage	(Sweden) IFK Göteborg	2–1	4–3	3rd
1963–64 Intertoto Cup	Group stage	(Austria) First Vienna FC	5–1	1–4	3rd
1963–64 Intertoto Cup	Group stage	(Germany) FC Bayern Munich	1–2	6–0	3rd
1965–66 Intertoto Cup	Group stage	(Sweden) Örgryte IS	2–2	1–1	3rd
1965–66 Intertoto Cup	Group stage	(Germany) Eintracht Braunschweig	3–0	2–1	3rd
1965–66 Intertoto Cup	Group stage	(Switzerland) FC Luzern	0–0	2–2	3rd
1967 Intertoto Cup	Group stage	(Belgium) K.S.V. Waregem	4–0	0–2	3rd (Note: The 1967 Intertoto Cup was the first in which no knock-out rounds were contested, and therefore the first in which no winner was declared.)
1967 Intertoto Cup	Group stage	(France) FC Girondins de Bordeaux	0–1	4–1	3rd
1967 Intertoto Cup	Group stage	(Switzerland) FC Lugano	1–0	0–2	3rd
1975 Intertoto Cup	Group stage	(Austria) FC Wacker Innsbruck	1–3	0–6	3rd (Note: In the 1975 Intertoto Cup no knock-out rounds were contested, and therefore no winner was declared.)
1975 Intertoto Cup	Group stage	(Sweden) Malmö FF	0–3	0–2	3rd
1975 Intertoto Cup	Group stage	(Belgium) Standard Liège	0–1	0–2	3rd
1994 Intertoto Cup	Group stage	(Switzerland) FC Lausanne-Sport	3–1	—N/a	4rd (Note: In the 1994 Intertoto Cup no knock-out rounds were contested, and therefore no winner was declared.)
1994 Intertoto Cup	Group stage	(Germany) Bayer 04 Leverkusen	—N/a	1–3	4rd
1994 Intertoto Cup	Group stage	(Austria) FC Tirol Innsbruck	—N/a	0–0 (Note: This match was interrupted due to rain.)	4rd
1994 Intertoto Cup	Group stage	(Sweden) AIK Fotboll	2–2	—N/a	4rd
