= 1964 UEFA European Under-18 Championship =

Tournament details
- Host country: Netherlands
- Dates: 26 March – 5 April
- Teams: 24

Final positions
- Champions: England (3rd title)
- Runners-up: Spain
- Third place: Portugal
- Fourth place: Scotland

Tournament statistics
- Matches played: 31
- Goals scored: 97 (3.13 per match)

The UEFA European Under-18 Championship 1964 Final Tournament was held in the Netherlands.

== Teams ==
The following teams entered the tournament:

- Austria
- Belgium
- Bulgaria
- Czechoslovakia
- East Germany
- England
- France
- West Germany
- Greece
- Hungary
- Italy
- Luxembourg
- Netherlands (host)
- Northern Ireland
- Poland
- Portugal
- Republic of Ireland
- Romania
- Scotland
- Spain
- Sweden
- Switzerland
- Turkey
- Yugoslavia

== Group stage ==
=== Group 1 ===
Teams	Pld	W	D	L	GF	GA	GD	Pts
Spain	2	2	0	0	6	1	+5	4
Belgium	2	1	0	1	2	5	–3	2
Hungary	2	0	0	2	2	4	–2	0

26 March 1964

Spain	4 – 0	Belgium
Pujol 10'; Filosia 35', 70'; Ramón Navarro López 52'

Utrecht
Attendance: 4,000
Referee: Gerhard Schulenburg (West Germany)
28 March 1964

Hungary	1 – 2	Belgium
Stadler 56'		? Lespoix

Heemstede
Attendance: 3,000
30 March 1964

Spain	2 – 1	Hungary
Filosia 5'; Jesús María Echevarría García 8'		75' Stadler

Hilversum
Attendance: 3,000
Referee: Jack Taylor (England)

=== Group 2 ===
Teams	Pld	W	D	L	GF	GA	GD	Pts
Turkey	2	2	0	0	10	0	+10	4
Yugoslavia	2	1	0	1	3	2	+1	2
Luxembourg	2	0	0	2	0	11	–11	0

26 March 1964

Turkey	8 – 0	Luxembourg
Karadoğan 24'; Özbilgin 35'; Yalçıntaş 47'; Dağdeviren 49', 69'; Büyükbuğdaypınar 65'; Tunaoğlu 76'; Bayraktar 79'	Report

Volendam
Attendance: 600
Referee: André Hauben (Belgium)
28 March 1964

Yugoslavia	3 – 0	Luxembourg
Pavić 34', 49'; Džajić 79'

Sportpark Schoonenberg, Velsen
Attendance: 1,500
30 March 1964

Turkey	2 – 0	Yugoslavia
Özbilgin 15'; Dağdeviren 25'	Report

Alkmaarderhout, Alkmaar
Attendance: 3,000

=== Group 3 ===
Teams	Pld	W	D	L	GF	GA	GD	Pts
Portugal	2	2	0	0	4	2	+2	4
Italy	2	1	0	1	3	2	+1	2
Greece	2	0	0	2	1	4	–3	0

26 March	Portugal	2–1	Italy
28 March	Italy	2–0	Greece
30 March	Portugal	2–1	Greece

=== Group 4 ===
Teams	Pld	W	D	L	GF	GA	GD	Pts
Czechoslovakia	2	2	0	0	4	2	+2	4
France	2	1	0	1	4	3	+1	2
Bulgaria	2	0	0	2	0	3	–3	0

26 March	Czechoslovakia	1–0	Bulgaria
28 March	France	2–0	Bulgaria
30 March	Czechoslovakia	3–2	France

=== Group 5 ===
Teams	Pld	W	D	L	GF	GA	GD	Pts
Sweden	2	1	0	1	3	2	+1	2
Netherlands	2	1	0	1	3	3	0	2
West Germany	2	1	0	1	3	4	–1	2

26 March	West Germany	2–1	Sweden
28 March	Sweden	2–0	Netherlands
30 March	Netherlands	3–1	West Germany

=== Group 6 ===
Teams	Pld	W	D	L	GF	GA	GD	Pts
Scotland	2	2	0	0	5	1	+4	4
Switzerland	2	0	0	2	1	5	–4	0
East Germany	Refused visa by Dutch government.							

26 March	Scotland	3–1	Switzerland
30 March	Switzerland	0–2	Scotland

=== Group 7 ===
Teams	Pld	W	D	L	GF	GA	GD	Pts
Austria	2	1	1	0	4	2	+2	3
Northern Ireland	2	1	0	1	2	3	–1	2
Romania	2	0	1	1	1	2	–1	1

26 March	Austria	1–1	Romania
28 March	Northern Ireland	1–0	Romania
30 March	Austria	3–1	Northern Ireland

=== Group 8 ===
Teams	Pld	W	D	L	GF	GA	GD	Pts
England	2	1	1	0	7	1	+6	3
Poland	2	1	1	0	2	1	+1	3
Republic of Ireland	2	0	0	2	0	7	–7	0

26 March	England	1–1	Poland
28 March	Poland	1–0	Republic of Ireland
30 March	England	6–0	Republic of Ireland

== Quarterfinals ==
1 April 1964

Spain	1 – 0	Turkey
Arieta 4'	Report

Dordrecht
Attendance: 2,500
Referee: Jack Taylor (England)
1 April 1964

Portugal	4 – 0	Czechoslovakia
Artur Jorge 32'; Nélson 39'; João Carlos 46'; Bernardo 52'

Utrecht
Referee: Gerhard Schulenberg (West Germany)
1 April 1964

Scotland	1 – 0	Sweden
McCalliog 20'

Amsterdam
Attendance: 1,000
Referee: Alojz Obtulovič (Czechoslovakia)
1 April 1964

England	2 – 1	Austria
Sadler 12'; Sissons ?'		?' (pen.) Kaiser

Rotterdam
Attendance: 4,500
Referee: Iginio Rigato (Italy)

== Semifinals ==
3 April 1964

England	4 – 0	Portugal
Sadler; Redknapp; Rogers	Report

The Hague
Attendance: 6.000
Referee: István Zsolt (Hungary)
3 April 1964

Spain	3 – 2	Scotland
José Luis Lavandera 4'; Arieta 39', 75'	Report	15' Stevenson; 24' Buckley

Den Bosch
Attendance: 5,000
Referee: Gerhard Schulenberg (West Germany)

== Third place match ==
4 April 1964

Portugal	3 – 2	Scotland
Nélson 18', 37' (pen.); Artur Jorge 85'		53' Harper; 64' Buckley

Rotterdam
Attendance: 2,000
Referee: Manuel Goméz Arribas (Spain)

== Final ==
4 April 1964

England	4 – 0	Spain
Knowles 11'; Rogers 27', 52'; Sissons 53'

Olympisch Stadion, Amsterdam
Attendance: 12.451
Referee: Leo Horn (Netherlands)

1964 UEFA European Under-18 Championship

England
Third title
