= Matute (disambiguation) =

Matute is a village in the province and autonomous community of La Rioja, Spain.

Matute may also refer to:

- Ana María Matute (1925–2014), Spanish writer
- Eloy Matute (born 1944), Spanish footballer
- Genoveva Matute (1915–2009), Filipino author
- José Lino Matute (1780–unknown), president of Honduras from 1838 until 1839
- Kelvin Matute (born 1988), Cameroonian footballer
- Oskar Matute (born 1972), Basque politician
- Roberto Matute (born 1972), Spanish footballer

== See also ==
- Vegas de Matute, municipality in the province of Segovia, Castile and León, Spain
