= Olde Riekerink =

Olde Riekerink is a surname. Notable people with the surname include:

- Edwin Olde Riekerink (born 1961), Dutch footballer
- Jan Olde Riekerink (born 1963), Dutch footballer and manager
