= Oxygen cocktail =

Type of beverage enriched in gaseous oxygen

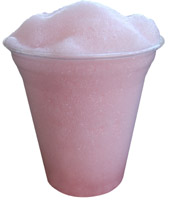
Oxygen cocktail

The oxygen cocktail is a foamy substance containing a beverage drink (juice, milk, etc.) enriched in gaseous oxygen. The drink is used by a number of Soviet medical institutions; their research suggest that the drink allegedly reduces chronic fatigue syndrome and hypoxia and activates metabolism.

Some older reports that are available in English describe the use of different oxygen cocktails or oxygenated foams for certain medical conditions, but evidence to support its use is limited. A similar approach using oxygenated water was alleged to have health benefits but the results were controversial.

== History ==
The oxygen cocktail was developed in the 1960s by the Russian academician N. N. Sirotinin.

== Ingredients ==
Juices (grape, cherry, raspberry, etc.), syrups, water, milk and fruit-drinks are often used as the base of the cocktail. Oily and sparkling liquids result in poor homogeneity of the foam. The base liquid might contain extracts of plants and herbs such as hawthorn, strawflower, motherwort and rose hip, which themselves are used in the clinical practices. An essential element of the oxygen cocktail is the foaming agent, such as gelatin egg white or liquorice. Initially, oxygen cocktails were made with egg white. However clinical trials proved that this ingredient resulted in allergenicity and unpleasant taste and could promote infectious diseases; thus it was replaced by liquorice, which is a foaming agent, tonic and sedative.

== Mechanism of action ==
The cocktail allegedly stimulates metabolism, blood circulation, redox and the immune system.

== Clinical research in Russia ==
In 2005 the Research Center of Children's Health (Russian Academy of Medical Sciences) studied the efficiency of the oxygen cocktails as a part of the complex therapy of children and teenagers with chronic diseases of the respiratory and digestive tracts. Patients took 200 mL of the oxygen cocktail per day. It was concluded that the oxygen cocktail activates metabolism, reduces fatigue and stimulates efficiency and the immune system without visible side effects. Improvement was observed for all patients with respiratory diseases and 85% of the children having digestive tract problems.

As a result of these studies, it was suggested that the oxygen cocktail

- Reduces fatigue, helps eliminating chronic fatigue syndrome
- Improves the sleep
- Activates metabolism
- Optimizes the respiratory, cardiovascular, nervous and digestive systems.
- Stimulates cardial and cerebral circulation
- Optimizes the blood sugar concentration, increases the hemoglobin content.
- Stimulates the immune system
- Facilitates optimal fetal development during pregnancy

Pubmed (as in 2022) gives nine papers on a search query "oxygen cocktail", all are in Russian (and published in Russian journals), four of them have English abstracts. Two of these studies weren't aimed to have control groups, the two others assessed oxygen cocktails in a combination of additional measures that included many other different techniques.

== Usage ==
In Russia, oxygen cocktails are prescribed for expecting mothers, sportsmen, children and teenagers, people living in poor ecological conditions or experiencing hypoxia, cardiovascular system and digestive tract diseases, having problems with the immune system, insomnia, chronic fatigue syndrome and excessive body weight.

The contraindications of the oxygen cocktail are:

- Acute bronchial asthma
- Gallstones
- Status asthmaticus
- Hyperthymic temperament
- Respiratory failure
- Intoxication of the body
- Urolithiasis
- Peptic ulcer
- Allergy to one or more ingredients of the cocktail.

In Ulaanbaatar, Mongolia, people consume Russian branded oxygen cocktails to protect themselves from yearly winter smog, and the Head of a WHO's Department Maria Neira criticized that practice as scientifically unproven.

== See also ==
- Adaptogen
- Hydrogen peroxide therapy
- Hypoxia (medical)
- Oxygen therapy
- Oxygen concentrator
- Oxygen bar
- Nitro cold brew coffee
