= Ton Pansier =

Dutch footballer (1947–2021)

Personal information
- Full name: Ton Pansier
- Date of birth: 1 February 1947
- Place of birth: Rotterdam, Netherlands
- Date of death: 12 May 2021 (aged 74)
- Place of death: , Netherlands
- Position: Midfielder

Youth career
- 1963-1965: Xerxes

Senior career*
Years	Team	Apps	(Gls)
1965-1967	Xerxes	8	(0)
1967–1968	XerxesDZB/DHC	1	(0)
1968–1970	SVV	15+	(0+)
1971–1974	Neptunus		

International career
1965	Netherlands U-19	5	(1)
- * Club domestic league appearances and goals

Ton Pansier (1 February 1947 – 12 May 2021) was a Dutch footballer who played as a defender.

== Club career ==
He made his senior debut in the Tweede Divisie for hometown club Xerxes on 2 May 1965 against 't Gooi and played there alongside club legends Nol Heijerman, Rob Jacobs, Willem van Hanegem and Eddy Treijtel. His playing opportunities however were limited since he mostly featured as a back-up for Yugoslav playmaker Lazar Radović.

He left Xerxes in 1968 for SVV and clinched promotion to the Eredivisie in 1969 with them.

In 1971 he joined Neptunus.

== International career ==
He earned five caps for the Netherlands U19 team in 1965 and played at the 1965 UEFA European Under-18 Championship.
