= 1969–70 Czechoslovak First League =

Czechoslovak First League
- Season: 1969–70
- Champions: Slovan Bratislava
- Relegated: SONP Kladno; Bohemians Prague
- European Cup: Slovan Bratislava
- Cup Winners' Cup: TJ Gottwaldov
- Fairs Cup: FC Spartak Trnava; Sparta Prague
- Top goalscorer: Jozef Adamec (18 goals)

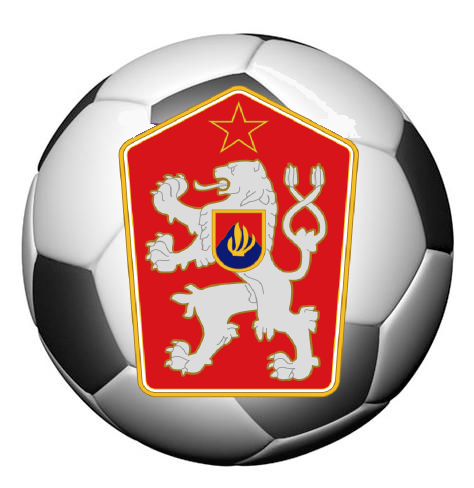

Statistics of Czechoslovak First League in the 1969–70 season.

== Overview ==
It was contested by 16 teams, and ŠK Slovan Bratislava won the championship. Jozef Adamec was the league's top scorer with 18 goals.

== Stadia and locations ==
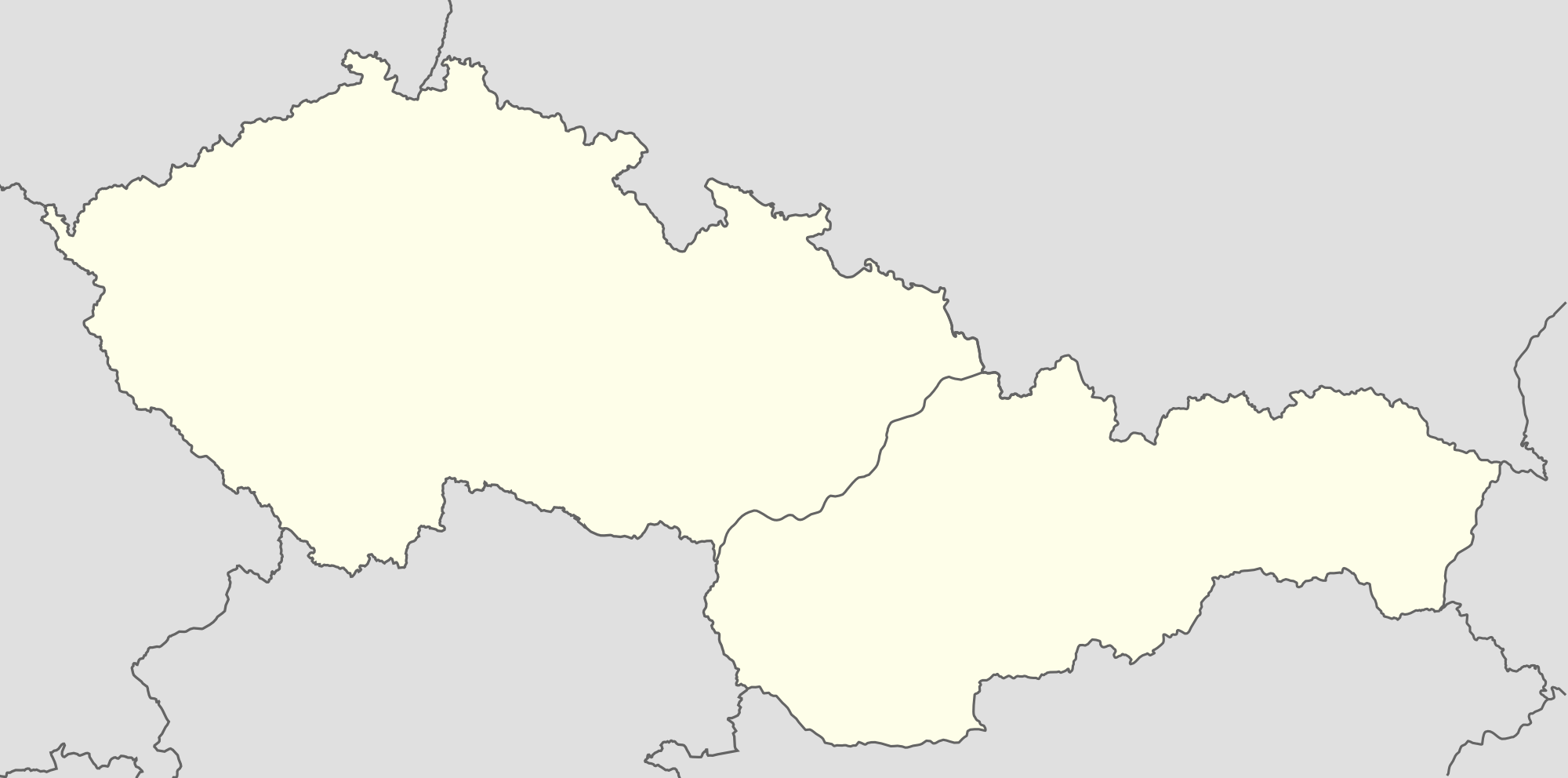
Location of clubs in the 1969–70 Czechoslovak First League

== League standings ==
Pos	Team	Pld	W	D	L	GF	GA	GD	Pts	Qualification or relegation
1	Slovan Bratislava (C)	30	16	11	3	39	15	+24	43	Qualification for European Cup first round
2	Spartak Trnava	30	15	10	5	55	23	+32	40	Invitation for Inter-Cities Fairs Cup first round
3	Sparta Prague	30	15	8	7	40	25	+15	38	Invitation for Inter-Cities Fairs Cup first round
4	Inter Bratislava	30	14	8	8	45	32	+13	36	
5	Sklo Union Teplice	30	11	11	8	26	19	+7	33	
6	Lokomotíva Košice	30	12	8	10	36	25	+11	32	
7	Dukla Prague	30	10	12	8	34	31	+3	32	
8	VSS Košice	30	10	10	10	32	31	+1	30	
9	Tatran Prešov	30	9	12	9	22	22	0	30	
10	Jednota Trenčín	30	8	11	11	35	29	+6	27	
11	Baník Ostrava	30	7	12	11	26	32	−6	26	
12	ZVL Žilina	30	9	8	13	34	42	−8	26	
13	Slavia Prague	30	7	12	11	29	42	−13	26	
14	TJ Gottwaldov	30	8	7	15	28	45	−17	23	Qualification for Cup Winners' Cup preliminary round
15	SONP Kladno (R)	30	7	7	16	29	61	−32	21	Relegation to Czechoslovak Second League
16	Bohemians Prague (R)	30	3	11	16	23	59	−36	17	Relegation to Czechoslovak Second League

Source: rsssf.com
(C) Champions; (R) Relegated

== Results ==
Home \ Away	OST	BOH	DUK	INT	TRE	LOK	TEP	SLA	SLO	KLA	SPA	TRN	PRE	GOT	KOŠ	ŽIL
Baník Ostrava		0–1	0–1	1–1	1–0	0–0	1–1	5–1	0–0	7–1	0–1	0–3	0–0	0–1	0–0	0–0
Bohemians Prague	0–2		4–4	1–2	0–1	1–1	0–0	0–0	0–0	1–1	1–5	1–6	0–0	3–0	2–3	0–0
Dukla Prague	0–1	1–1		1–0	0–0	0–0	0–0	1–1	2–3	3–2	1–0	2–0	2–0	2–1	0–0	0–0
Inter Bratislava	1–1	0–0	3–1		1–0	3–0	1–0	3–0	2–1	2–1	3–0	2–2	1–0	2–1	4–0	5–1
Jednota Trenčín	2–1	5–1	1–2	0–0		0–0	1–0	0–0	0–0	5–1	2–1	1–1	1–1	1–2	3–1	0–0
Lokomotíva Košice	4–0	4–1	0–2	1–3	2–1		2–1	2–2	1–1	4–0	2–0	1–0	0–1	2–0	0–0	2–0
Sklo Union Teplice	2–0	1–0	0–0	0–0	1–0	1–0		0–0	3–1	1–0	2–2	1–0	1–0	3–0	1–0	3–0
Slavia Prague	1–1	1–1	1–1	1–0	2–0	0–3	2–1		0–2	2–0	1–1	1–2	0–0	1–1	3–2	3–2
Slovan Bratislava	3–0	4–0	3–0	2–1	1–0	1–0	3–0	1–0		0–0	1–1	2–1	0–0	2–0	2–0	1–0
SONP Kladno	0–0	2–3	0–0	4–0	2–1	0–3	0–0	2–1	0–0		0–2	1–0	3–1	2–1	0–0	2–1
Sparta Prague	2–0	1–0	0–3	3–1	1–1	1–0	1–0	2–0	0–0	5–2		0–0	1–0	1–1	2–0	2–0
Spartak Trnava	5–1	6–0	1–1	1–0	1–1	3–1	1–1	2–0	1–1	3–1	2–1		2–0	4–0	3–2	2–0
Tatran Prešov	0–0	2–0	2–0	1–1	2–1	1–0	1–0	2–0	0–1	3–0	1–1	0–0		0–0	0–0	3–1
TJ Gottwaldov	0–1	1–0	3–2	3–3	2–2	0–1	1–0	2–1	1–2	4–1	0–2	0–2	0–0		0–0	0–1
VSS Košice	1–2	2–0	1–0	3–0	2–1	0–0	1–1	3–3	1–0	2–0	0–1	0–0	3–0	2–0		2–0
ZVL Žilina	0–0	4–1	3–2	2–0	0–4	2–0	1–1	0–1	1–1	6–1	1–0	1–1	3–1	2–3	2–1	

Source: statistiky1ligy.fotbal.cz
Legend: Blue = home team win; Yellow = draw; Red = away team win.

== Attendances ==
#	Club	Average	Highest
1	Sparta Praha	17,932	29,310
2	Slovan	13,408	38,413
3	Slavia Praha	12,600	18,601
4	Spartak Trnava	10,345	21,159
5	Baník Ostrava	7,909	13,002
6	Teplice	7,166	13,057
7	Inter Bratislava	6,729	38,631
8	Žilina	6,163	14,500
9	Gottwaldov	6,119	12,365
10	Tatran Prešov	5,659	15,859
11	Bohemians	5,500	15,598
12	Košice	5,489	9,987
13	Lokomotíva Košice	4,991	16,775
14	Kladno	4,613	14,647
15	Trenčín	4,190	12,258
16	Dukla Praha	4,104	9,855
