= Francisco Benedito =

Spanish entrepreneur

- Born: Francisco Benedito Valentín; May 4, 1979 (age 47); La Vall d'Uixó, Spain
- Education: Paris Nanterre University; Universidad CEU San Pablo
- Occupations: Entrepreneur, public speaker
- Years active: 2004 – present
- Known for: ClimateTrade

Francisco Benedito Valentín (born 4 May 1979) is a Spanish businessman, entrepreneur and public speaker based in Valencia, Spain. He is the founder and current CEO of ClimateTrade, a blockchain-based marketplace for carbon offsetting and the chairman at ClimateCoin, the world's first regulated crypto carbon asset.

== Biography ==
Benedito was born in May 1979, to Juan José Benedito and María Aurora Valentín, in La Vall d'Uixó, Castellón. He attended Universidad CEU San Pablo in Madrid where he earned his law degree in 2003. He also attended Paris Nanterre University and received his MBA degree in 2004. After completing his education, Benedito joined Banco Bilbao Vizcaya Argentaria (BBVA) where he worked for 15 years as a regional manager until 2019.

In 2017, Benedito founded ClimateCoin, a crypto carbon asset, with José Lindo, Pedro Ramón López and Juan Boluda. ClimateCoin is the first CO_{2} token to be listed in crypto exchanges. It is an initiative to use blockchain distributed ledger technology to decentralize the impact of decarbonization and materialize the Paris Agreement. Benedito presented ClimateCoin at the 2017 United Nations Climate Change Conference where he was the keynote speaker. ClimateCoin was also recognized as one of the best solutions to address climate change in the 2018 World Economic and Social Survey by the United Nations Department of Economic and Social Affairs.

In 2019, Benedito co-founded ClimateTrade, a blockchain-based marketplace that facilitates the purchase of carbon credits to sustainable projects in order to achieve carbon neutrality. ClimateTrade was established in Valencia, Spain and reincorporated in the United States in 2022. As of December 2021, the company had offset more than 2 million tons of carbon. Around 300 companies are registered on ClimateTrade platform including Telefónica, Banco Santander, Cabify and Iberia.

Benedito regularly speaks about the intersection of climate change, business and technological innovation. He has been invited to speak at several climate events including the Seoul Climate and the Energy Summit (CESS, 2018), The World Green Economy Summit (WGES, Dubai, 2019), Austrian World Summit (2019) and the Sustainable Innovation Forum at 2019 United Nations Climate Change Conference in Madrid and 2021 United Nations Climate Change Conference in Glasgow.

In 2021, Benedito was included in Sachamama list of The 100 Latinos Most Committed to Climate Action endorsed by World Wide Fund for Nature (WWF), The Nature Conservancy, the World Environment Center and various other environmental organizations. In January 2022, Benedito was also listed in Los 22 protagonistas que cambiarán el 22 , a list of 22 business leaders most likely to create disruptive changes in 2022, by Forbes Spain.
