= Austrian World Summit =

Annual climate conference in Vienna

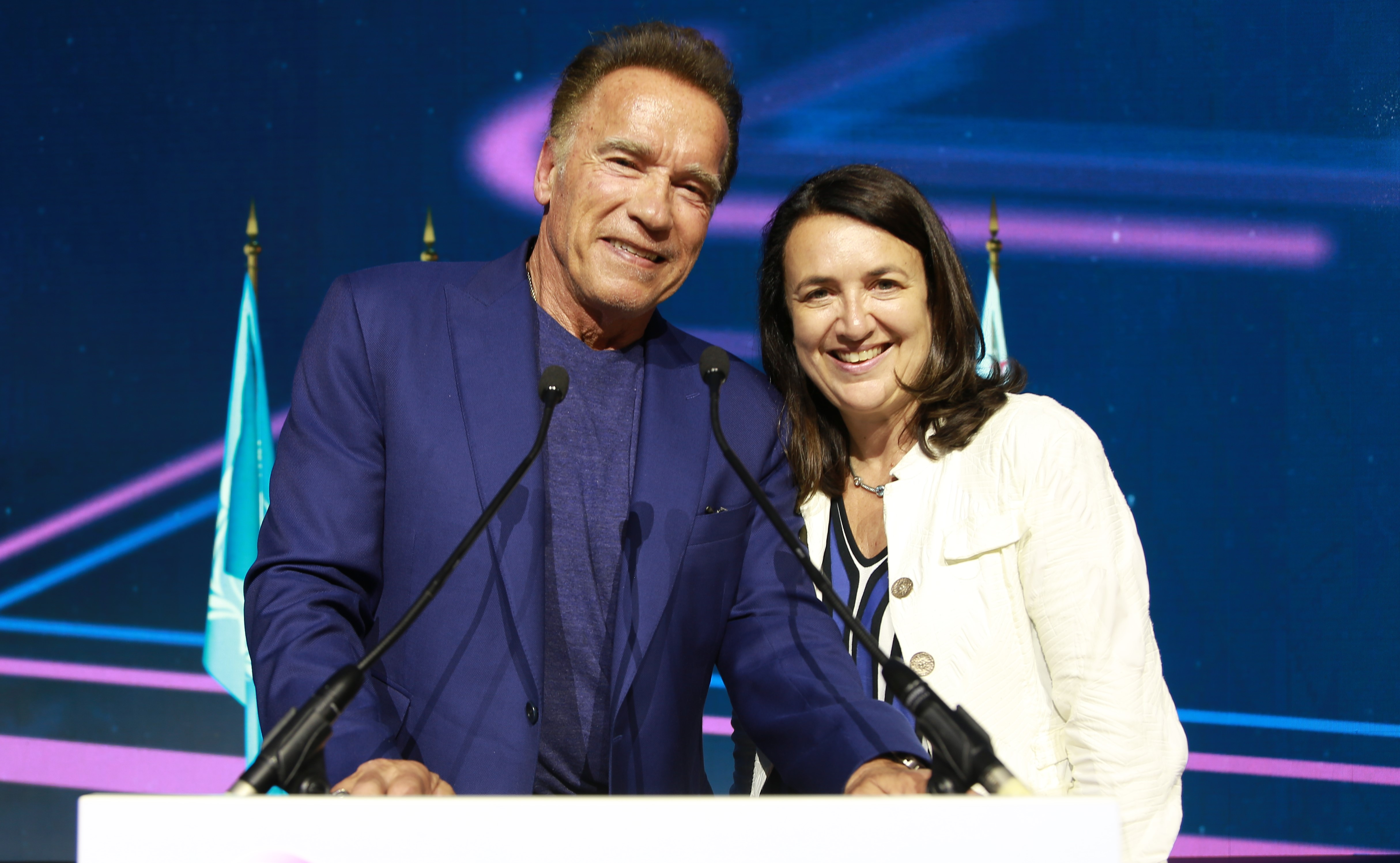
Monika Langthaler and Arnold Schwarzenegger at the Austrian World Summit in 2019

The Austrian World Summit is an annual climate conference which has taken place in Vienna since 2017. It aims to connect stakeholders from politics, civil society and business to create a broad alliance for climate protection. It is organised by the Schwarzenegger Climate Initiative and has been held at the Hofburg Palace and the Spanish Riding School in the past. Arnold Schwarzenegger founded the conference, which he organises together with Monika Langthaler. The summit takes place under the patronage of Austrian president Alexander Van der Bellen.

== Concept ==
The conference seeks to contribute to achieving a full implementation of the Paris Agreement and the Sustainable Development Goals as well as networking of politics, business and finances with the United Nations, NGOs, regions and cities. In comparison to other climate conferences, the Austrian World Summit is not mainly a diplomatic conference but seeks to showcase concrete examples and possible actions for a sustainable future. Since its inception in 2017, the Austrian World Summit has become one of the most prominent climate conferences worldwide. In fact, it was the largest climate conference in 2020 since similar events had to be cancelled due to the COVID-19 outbreak. Conference speakers and participants have included António Guterres, Greta Thunberg, Patricia Espinosa Cantellano, Li Yong, Maria Neira, Kristalina Georgieva and Scott Joseph Kelly.

The most recent summit took place on 1 July 2021 under the motto “Healthy Planet – Healthy People” with well-known speakers like Lisa Jackson (Sustainability Manager at Apple), Greta Thunberg (Climate activist) and Jane Goodall (Scientist). Since the COVID-19 pandemic, the AWS has taken place in hybrid mode. Each year, more than 1,000 people participate physically and millions of viewers watch the livestream online or on TV.

A speech by Austrian chancellor Sebastian Kurz in 2018 was criticized by the activist group System Change, not Climate Change due to the Austrian government's lack of climate policies. The group staged a protest at the summit and took over the microphone during Kurz's speech.

In 2019 and 2020, the summit was accompanied by a public festival, a Climate Kirtag, which was aimed at raising awareness for climate issues in Vienna. The first event featured concerts by Hubert von Goisern and Conchita Wurst.

The next Austrian World Summit will take place on 14 June 2022 – exactly 30 years after the “Earth Summit” in Rio de Janeiro. The environmental activist Severn Cullis-Suzuki who gave an inflammatory speech in Rio de Janeiro is expected. Other well-known speakers and guests include Joko Winterscheidt (German entertainer), Luisa Neubauer (Climate activist), and Matt Iseman (US moderator).

== Legacy ==
In 2019, the conference won the European Culture Award Taurus for extraordinary contributions to European culture.

In 2020, the Austrian World Summit took place in September with 340 participants. It was the biggest climate conference to take place that year because of the cancellation of all major climate conferences due to the COVID-19 pandemic.
