= Bernardo Acosta =

Paraguayan footballer

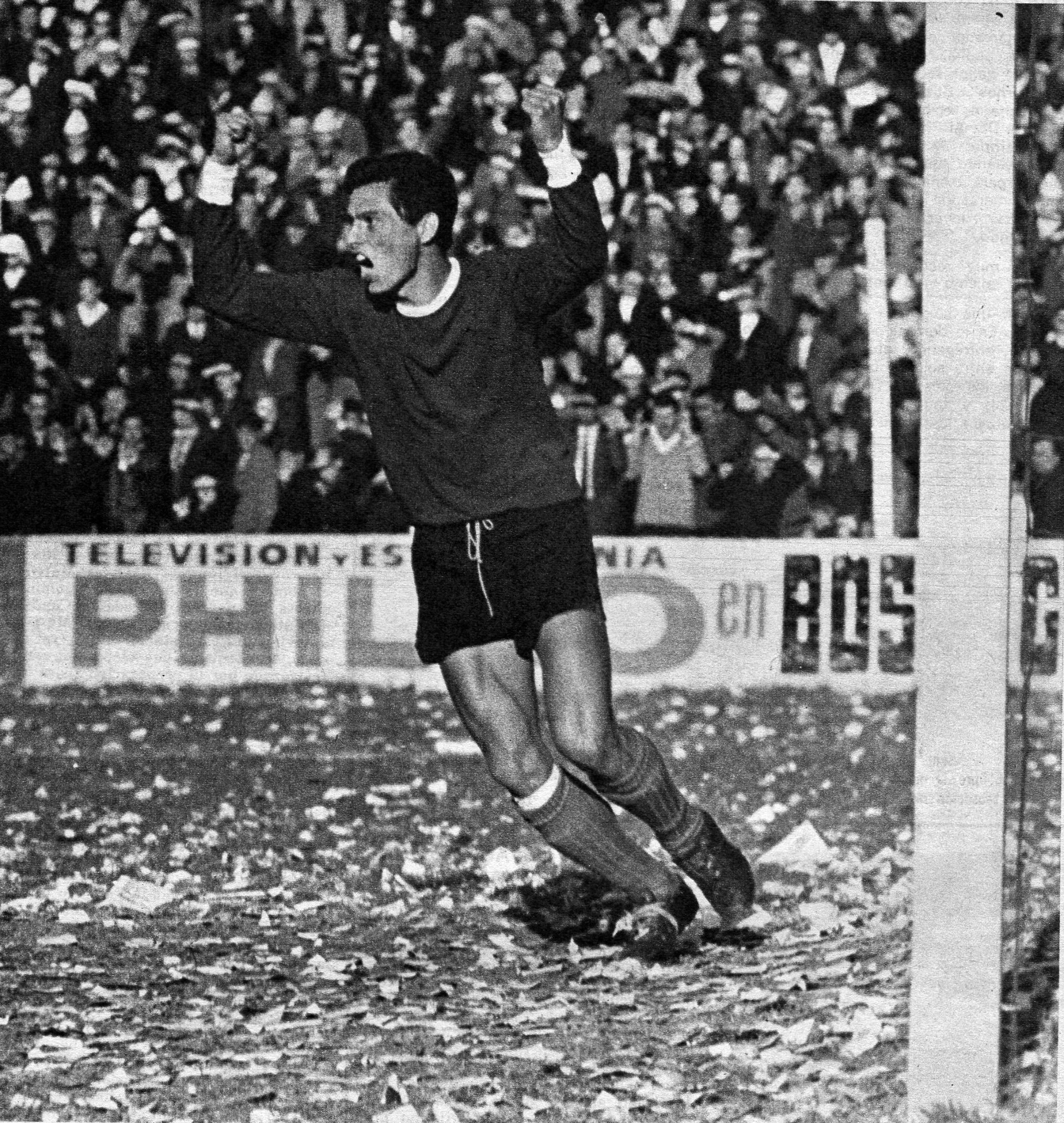
- Acosta in Club Lanús

Personal information
- Full name: Bernardo Acosta Miranda
- Date of birth: 2 August 1944 (age 82)
- Place of birth: Asunción, Paraguay
- Height: 1.77 m (5 ft 10 in)
- Position: Forward

Senior career*
Years	Team	Apps	(Gls)
1962–1968	Club Atlético Lanús	174	(74)
1969–1975	Sevilla FC		(85)
1975	Xerez		
Total		372	(159)

International career
1972	Paraguay	0	(0)
- * Club domestic league appearances and goals

Bernardo Acosta Miranda, also known as Baby Acosta (born 2 August 1944) is a Paraguayan retired footballer who played as a forward for CA Lanús in Argentina in the 1960s, and then Sevilla FC in Spain in the early 1970s.

== Playing career ==
=== CA Lanús ===
Born in the Paraguayan city of Asunción on 2 August 1944, Acosta was only five when he moved to Buenos Aires, where he began his football career in the youth ranks of Club Atlético Lanús. He made his debut for the club's first team on 8 December 1962, aged 18, on the last matchday of a second division tournament, which ended in a 1–2 loss to Deportivo Espafiol. While there, he formed a great attacking partnership with Ángel Silva, which became known as "the Bricklayers" due to their ability to construct attacking plays called "walls" until skillfully reaching the goal. Together, they achieved promotion to the Argentine Primera División in 1964, where they finished third at the first time of asking.

With the number 10 on his back, his presence at Lanús was so important that the media called him "Mr. Goal". In 1967, Acosta scored a 5-goal haul against Quilmes, which helped finish as the top scorer of the Metropolitan Championship with 18 goals. He was one of only five Paraguayan to have been a top scorer in Argentine football, remaining the last one to have done so. In total, he scored 81 goals in 174 official matches for Lanús.

Due to the poor conditions of the pitches in Argentina, Acosta tore his meniscus, but since there were no substitutions, he kept playing and ended up scoring the winner. Due to his injury, the Lanús president Chaparra extended his contract by only one year, which led to an argument between the two, so when Acosta ended up performing well, scoring 19 goals in the first half of the 1969 season, he then refused to have his contract further extend. Chaparra thus decided to transfer him to Europe, which he was only able to do after agreeing with a series of demands from Acosta: six months of the debt and a million pesos. He then went to Spain to sign for Espanyol, but its coach then asked Epifanio Rojas, Acosta's representative, for the player undergo a series of test matches, which Rojas refused due to him being a "proven player", so he ended up signing for Sevilla instead, along with another Asunción native, Herminio Toñánez. After signing the pre-contract with Sevilla FC, he returned to Buenos Aires to get married and collect the amounts promised by Chaparra, who only did so after Acosta threatened to quit football; according to him, the threat was real as he "did not know Europe and was not ambitious". He even told his family and friends that he would return the following year, but he ended up never going back.

=== Sevilla FC ===
When he arrived in Seville in 1969, Acosta initially struggled with the squad and the language, especially because his assistant, who acted as a translator, was merely a tobacco representative and knew nothing about football, leading to many misunderstandings. He also struggled with the change of both the weather and the training methods, which focused more on technique with the ball instead of physicality. He made his debut for Sevilla in a home league fixture against Atlético Madrid on 14 September 1969, playing five minutes in an eventual 0–1 loss. He scored his first goal for the club via a backheel against Valencia to help his side to a 1–0 win.

While at Seville, he played three matches against rivals Real Betis, scoring a total of five goals against three different goalkeepers to help his side to two wins and a draw. One of those goalkeepers José Ramón Esnaola later described Acosta "as very clever, very skillful, lively, and intelligent like no other". In 1972, Acosta helped his side claim the Ciudad de Sevilla Trophy with a 1–0 victory over Honvéd, but the club ended up being relegated to the Segunda División, where on 24 March 1974, Acosta played its third and last match against Betis, which had also been relegated, scoring a 10-minute brace within just 15 minutes, the first with "an unstoppable shot from the half moon" and the second from the penalty spot, thus helping his side to a 2–1 victory.

Acosta remained loyal to Seville for five years, from 1969 until 1974, scoring a total of 85 goals in 172 official matches, including 37 goals in 86 La Liga matches and 1 goal in two European matches, both in the 1970–71 Inter-Cities Fairs Cup. With 85 goals, he is currently the 8th highest top scorer in the history of Sevilla FC, as well as 4th highest foreign scorer, only behind the Croatian Davor Šuker (90), the Brazilian Luis Fabiano (107), and the Mali Frédéric Kanouté (136).

=== Later career ===
Acosta played his last football for Xerez in 1975, where he retired following a tribute match. In 1972, he was listed as a member of the Paraguayan national team that participated in the 1972 Brazil Independence Cup, but he ultimately did not travel with the team.

== Later life ==
In August 1981, Acosta, together with his brother-in-law and Betis fan Rodolfo Orife opened the Cafetería Buenos Aires on Divino Redentor Street, just a few metres from the Ramón Sánchez Pizjuán Stadium, which he still runs, together with his Betis partner Manolo López. He was also a cousin of Sebastián Fleitas, a fellow footballer who also played for Sevilla as well as Real Madrid.

He was an admirer of Pelé, Pope Paul VI, and Marlon Brando's films.

== See also ==
- List of foreign La Liga players

== Honours ==
CA Lanús

- Argentine Second División
  - Champions (1): 1963–64
