= Henrique Campora =

Uruguayan footballer (1945-2010)

Personal information
- Full name: Henrique Raul Campora Carmo
- Date of birth: 6 July 1945
- Place of birth: Uruguay
- Date of death: 7 September 2010 (aged 65)
- Place of death: Portugal
- Position: Midfielder

Senior career*
Years	Team	Apps	(Gls)
1965–1969	Nacional		
1970	Sport Recife		
1970–1972	Barreirense	43	(12)
1972–1975	Vitória de Setúbal	65	(12)
1975–1979	Barreirense		
Total		108+	(24+)
- * Club domestic league appearances and goals

Henrique Raul Campora Carmo (6 July 1945 – 7 September 2010) was an Uruguayan professional footballer who played as a midfielder between 1965 and 1979. He started his career in Uruguay with Club Nacional, and spent time in Brazil with Sport Recife, before moving to Portugal and playing in the Portuguese leagues with Barreirense and Vitória de Setúbal.

== Career ==
Campora spent his early career with Nacional, Sport Recife and Barreirense.

Campora signed to Vitória de Setúbal in 1972 when the club finished second in the Primeira Liga. He then helped the club reach the quarter-finals of the UEFA Cup in the 1972–73 season scoring a goal against Tottenham Hotspur when the won their final game 2–1; the club were knocked out on away goals.

He finished his career at Barreirense.

After football Campora worked in civil construction before he died on 7 September 2010.
