= Pat Buckley (footballer) =

Scottish footballer and manager

Personal information
- Full name: Patrick McCabe Buckley
- Date of birth: 12 August 1946 (age 80)
- Place of birth: Leith, Scotland
- Position: Midfielder

Youth career
- Preston Athletic

Senior career*
Years	Team	Apps	(Gls)
1962–1964	Third Lanark	25	(2)
1964–1968	Wolverhampton Wanderers	29	(8)
1967	→ Los Angeles Wolves (guest)	5	(2)
1968–1972	Sheffield United	15	(2)
1972–1973	Rotherham United	3	(0)
- Pan-Hellenic

Managerial career
- 1976–1981: Kiveton Park
- 1981–1983: Sheffield FC
- 1983–1985: Retford Town
- 1985–1989: Goole Town
- * Club domestic league appearances and goals

Patrick McCabe Buckley (born 12 August 1946) is a Scottish former footballer, who manages Musselburgh Youngstars 17s and played for Wolverhampton Wanderers, Sheffield United and Rotherham United.

== Career ==
Buckley began his career at Third Lanark in his native Scotland before joining English First Division side Wolverhampton Wanderers in 1964. He made his senior debut for the club on 30 September 1964 in a 0–2 loss to Birmingham City. He made 15 appearances during his first season at Molineux, scoring three times, but failing to halt relegation.

He left in 1968, after 29 league appearances in total for them. He joined Sheffield United, and ended his league career with a brief spell at Rotherham United. Buckley later moved into non-league management, firstly with Kiveton Park FC, then Sheffield FC, Retford Town FC, and Gainsborough Trinity, before moving to Goole Town in 1986.

Buckley also was a newsagent for a time, owning a shop in his adopted home of Worksop, before returning home to Scotland in the 1990s.

His father, Patrick (known as Paddy) was also a footballer. His younger brother Graham was also a professional player in the Scottish Leagues - with clubs such as Cowdenbeath, Brechin City, Arbroath and Berwick Rangers.
