= Jaroslav Masrna =

Slovak footballer

Personal information
- Date of birth: 5 August 1950 (age 76)
- Place of birth: Czechoslovakia

Senior career*
Years	Team	Apps	(Gls)
- FC Spartak Trnava

International career
1974	Czechoslovakia	1	(0)
- * Club domestic league appearances and goals

Jasroslav Masrna (born 5 August 1950) is a former Slovak football player, who played for FC Spartak Trnava.
