= Meinhard Hemp =

German footballer

Personal information
- Date of birth: 10 December 1942 (age 83)
- Position: Forward

Senior career*
Years	Team	Apps	(Gls)
- Dynamo Dresden

Managerial career
- 2001: Dynamo Dresden
- * Club domestic league appearances and goals

Meinhard Hemp (born 10 December 1942) is a German former footballer who played for Dynamo Dresden. He later served as a coach at Dynamo, and managed the team for the last few games of the 2000-01 season.
