= Jan Olde Riekerink =

Dutch footballer (born 1963)

Personal information
- Full name: Johannes Hendrikus Olde Riekerink
- Date of birth: 22 February 1963 (age 63)
- Place of birth: Hengelo, Netherlands
- Position: Midfielder

Senior career*
Years	Team	Apps	(Gls)
1986–1991	Sparta Rotterdam	70	(5)
1990–1991	Dordrecht	23	(1)
1991–1993	Telstar	34	(0)
Total		137	(6)

Managerial career
- 2002–2003: Gent
- 2003–2005: Emmen
- 2011–2012: China U19
- 2015: China U16
- 2016–2017: Galatasaray
- 2018–2019: Heerenveen
- 2019–2021: Cape Town City
- 2023–2026: Dewa United
- * Club domestic league appearances and goals

Johannes Hendrikus Olde Riekerink (born 22 February 1963) is a Dutch professional football coach and former player who was most recently the head coach of Super League club Dewa United.

== Personal life ==
His brother Edwin was also a professional player.

== Playing career ==
Born in Hengelo, Olde Riekerink played professionally for Sparta Rotterdam, Dordrecht and Telstar between 1985 and 1993.

== Managerial career ==
Riekerink worked at Ajax as a youth coach from 1995 to 2002. He later managed Belgian club Gent and Dutch club Emmen, and has also been assistant manager at Portuguese club Porto and Ukrainian club Metalurh Donetsk. He was appointed Head of Youth Development of Jong Ajax in April 2007. on 15 June it was announced that Riekerink would give up his position at the club after irreconcilable differences with new board member Johan Cruyff.

He became manager of Turkish club Galatasaray in March 2016. Under Riekerink, Galatasaray won the 2015–16 Turkish Cup, beating Fenerbahçe 1−0 in the final on 26 May 2016. He was sacked in February 2017.

He was manager of Dutch club Heerenveen from 2018 to April 2019.

On 6 November 2019, he was presented as the new coach of South African club Cape Town City. He left the role on 21 May 2021. Later that month he signed a three-year contract with Turkish club İskenderunspor to become their CEO.

In January 2023 he became head coach of Indonesian club Dewa United. Under Riekerink, the club finished as runners-up in the 2024–25 Liga 1 season, qualifying for the 2025–26 AFC Challenge League for the first time in the club's history.

== Honours ==
=== Managerial ===
Galatasaray

- Turkish Cup: 2015–16
- Turkish Super Cup: 2016

Individual

- Liga 1 Coach of the Month: January 2025
