= Kalevi Nupponen =

Finnish footballer (born 1942)

Personal information
- Date of birth: 19 January 1942 (age 84)

International career
Years	Team	Apps	(Gls)
1961–1970	Finland	4	(0)

Kalevi Nupponen (born 19 January 1942) is a Finnish footballer. He played in four matches for the Finland national football team from 1961 to 1970.
