= Eloy Matute =

Spanish footballer (born 1944)

Personal information
- Full name: Eloy Matute Urbano
- Date of birth: 6 April 1944 (age 82)
- Place of birth: Armilla, Granada, Spain
- Position: Forward

Youth career
- Granada

Senior career*
Years	Team	Apps	(Gls)
1961–1962	Recreativo Granada		
1962–1963	Granada		
1963–1964	Recreativo Granada		
1964–1967	Granada		
1967–1972	Sevilla		
1972–1973	Mallorca		
1973–1975	Cádiz		
- * Club domestic league appearances and goals

Eloy Matute Urbano (born 6 April 1944), was a Spanish footballer who played as a forward for Granada and Sevilla in the 1960s.

== Career ==
Born on 6 April 1944 in Armilla, Granada, Matute began his career in the youth ranks of his hometown club Granada CF, eventually joining its reserve team Recreativo Granada in 1961, then in the Tercera División. The following year, he made his debut with the first team in a match against Hércules in Alicante, scoring his side's second goal in a 3–1 win. After spending the entire 1963–64 season at Recreativo, he was brought back up to the first team by Francisco Antúnez, but it was only under Jenő Kalmár that he was able to established himself as an undisputed starter, featuring in 32 of the 35 official matches and scoring 10 goals, including the decisive one against Málaga (1–1) to achieve promotion to La Liga.

In 1967, Matute was transferred to Sevilla, and although his first season there ended in relegation, he then helped the club win the 1968–69 Segunda División, and in their first season back in the top-flight, Sevilla finished in third place, which qualified the club for the 1970–71 Inter-Cities Fairs Cup. He stayed at the Nervion club for five years, from 1967 until 1972, scoring a total of 18 goals in 114 matches (103 in the league, nine in the Copa del Rey, and two in the Fairs Cup).

After leaving Sevilla in 1972, Matute joined Mallorca, for whom he scored six goals. At the end of the season, he and Isidoro signed for Cádiz. Matute made his debut for Cádiz on 2 September 1973, in a league match against Tenerife, and played his last match for the club two years later, on 11 May 1975, in a league match against Sabadell. In total, he scored 14 goals in 90 La Liga matches.

== Honours ==
Sevilla

- Segunda División
  - Champions (1): 1968–69
