= János Máté (footballer, born 1948) =

Hungarian footballer

Personal information
- Full name: János Máté
- Date of birth: 23 December 1948 (age 77)
- Place of birth: Bonyhád, Hungary
- Position: Forward

Youth career
- 1962–1967: Bonyhád Vasas

Senior career*
Years	Team	Apps	(Gls)
1968–1973	Pécsi MFC	127	(47)
1973–1975	Ferencvárosi TC	58	(14)
1975–1976	Budapest Honvéd FC	11	(0)
1976–1978	Kaposvári Rákóczi	29	(5)
1978–1980	Építők SC		
1980–1982	Dömsöd		

International career
1970–1975	Hungary	7	(2)

Managerial career
- 1985–1994: Vácszentlászló
- * Club domestic league appearances and goals

János Máté (born 23 December 1948) was a Hungarian professional footballer who played as a forward, later became a football coach. He was a member of the Hungary national team.

== Career ==
He started playing football in his hometown, Bonyhád. In 1968 he joined Pécsi MFC, where he scored 47 goals in five seasons. His first big success came on 4 November 1970 in the second leg of the European Cities Cup between Pécsi Dózsa and Newcastle United, where he scored both goals and won the second leg with 11 shots (5:2) in front of 22,000 spectators. János Máté joined the Hungary national team in 1970. Three years later, he was playing for Ferencváros. In 1974, they won the Hungarian National Championship and qualified for the KEK. He scored four times in the cup competition: twice against Cardiff City F.C., twice against Liverpool F.C. and twice against Malmö. His goal in Liverpool meant qualification and was a major factor in Ferencváros's progress to the final, where they were eventually defeated by FC Dynamo Kyiv. In total, he played 93 matches for Fradi, of which 58 were league, 25 international and 10 domestic. Number of goals: 34 (14 league, 20 other).

After 1975 he played one season for Budapest Honvéd FC and two seasons for Kaposvár Rákóczi FC in the first division. He then played for Építők, finishing his active sports career in Dömsöd.

=== National team ===
He played 7 times for the Hungary national team between 1970 and 1975 and scored 2 goals.

=== As a coach ===
From 1985 to 1994 he coached the Vácszentlászló football team.

== Honours ==
- Magyar Kupa (MNK)
  - Winner: 1974
- European Cup Winners' Cup (ECC)
  - Finalist: 1974-75
