= Vegas de Matute =

- Municipality
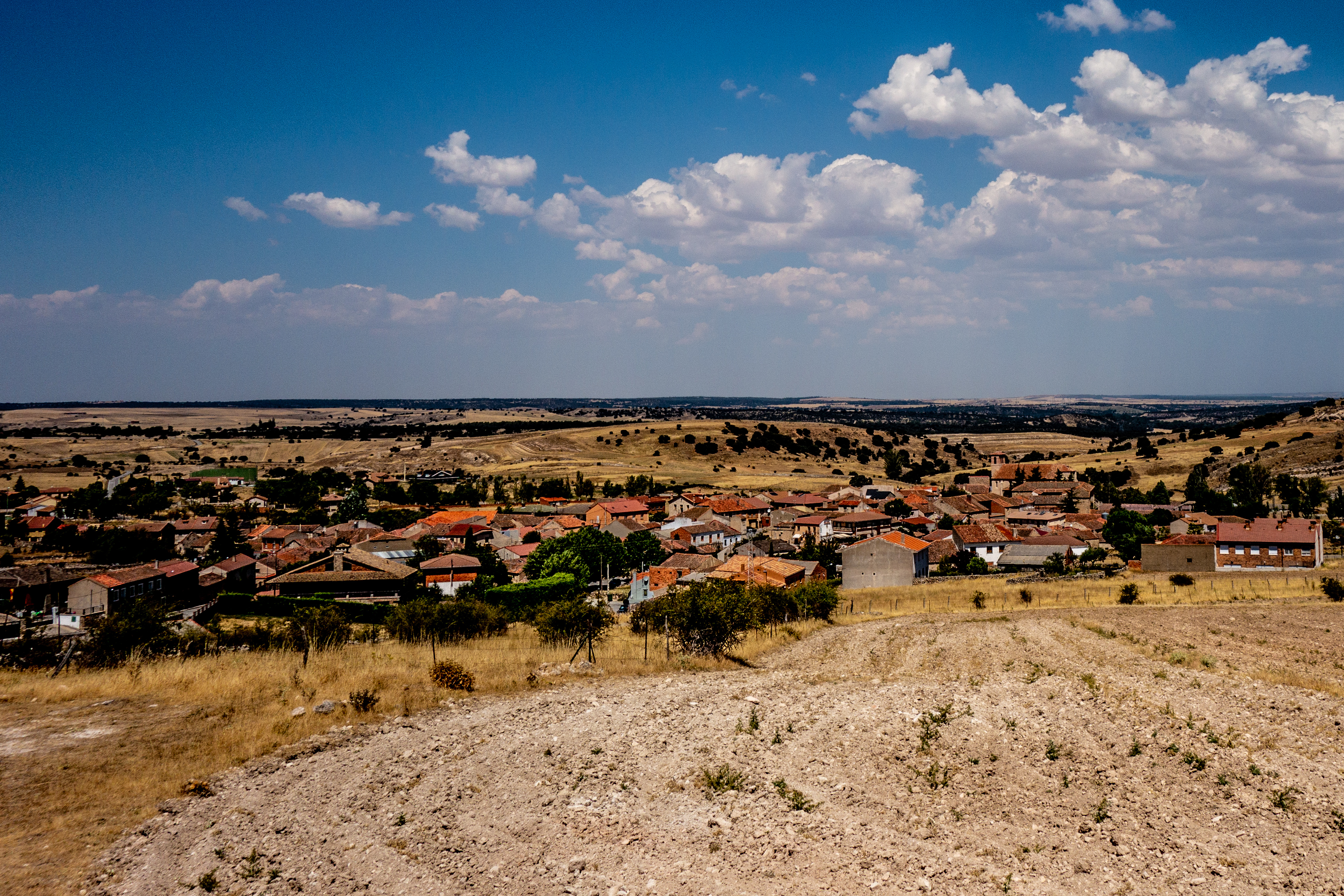
- Aerial view of Vegas de Matute

- Flag Coat of arms

- Location in Spain. Vegas de Matute (Spain)
- Coordinates: 40°47′42″N 4°16′40″W
- Country: Spain
- Autonomous community: Castile and León
- Province: Segovia
- Municipality: Vegas de Matute

Area
  - Total: 21 km^{2} (8.1 sq mi)

Population (2025-01-01)
  - Total: 370
  - Density: 18/km^{2} (46/sq mi)
- Time zone: UTC+1 (CET)
  - Summer (DST): UTC+2 (CEST)
- Website: Official website

'Vegas de Matute' is a municipality located in the province of Segovia, Castile and León, Spain. According to the 2021 census (INE), the municipality has a population of 313 inhabitants.

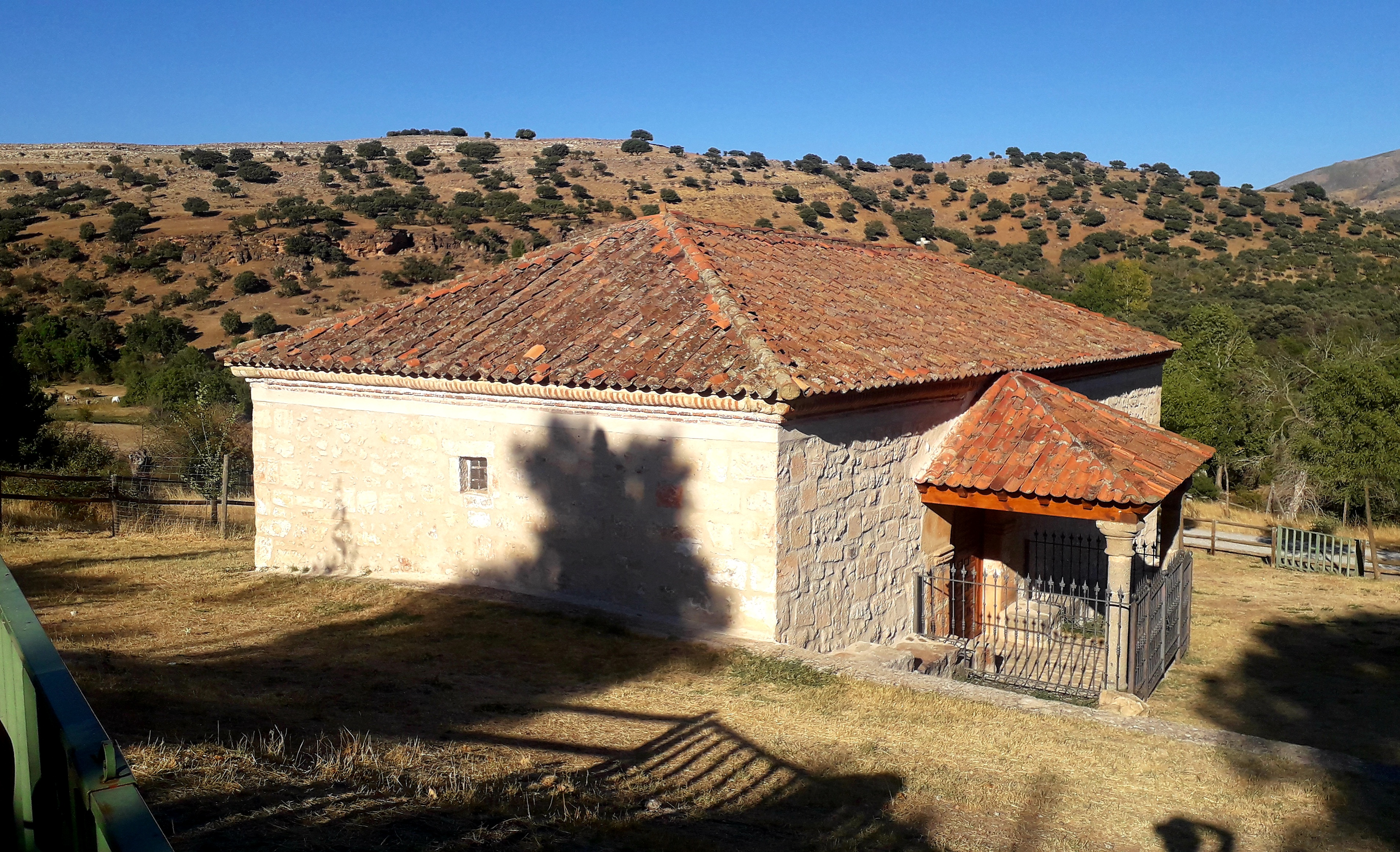
Hermitage of the Virgin of Matute
