= Janusz Kowalik =

Polish footballer (born 1944)

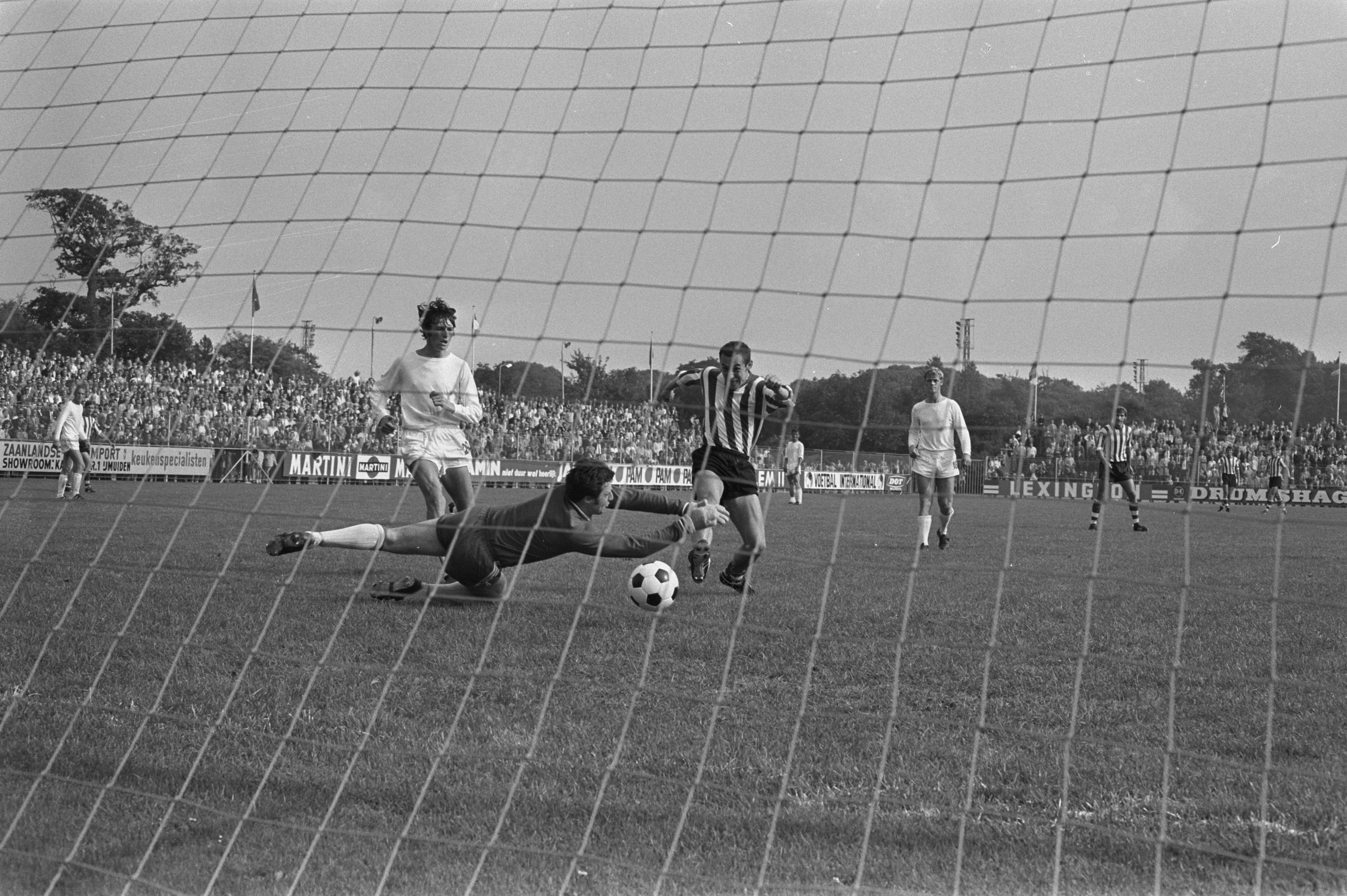

Personal information
- Full name: Janusz Antoni Kowalik
- Date of birth: 26 March 1944 (age 82)
- Place of birth: Nowy Sącz, Poland
- Height: 1.70 m (5 ft 7 in)
- Position: Striker

Senior career*
Years	Team	Apps	(Gls)
1960–1967	Cracovia		
1968	Chicago Mustangs	28	(30)
1968	California Clippers	0	(0)
1969–1974	Sparta Rotterdam	123	(67)
1974–1976	NEC	31	(6)
1976	Chicago Sting	14	(9)
1976–1977	MVV	9	(2)
1977	Chicago Sting	6	(1)
1977–1979	MVV	55	(24)
1979–1980	Patro Eisden		

International career
- Poland U18
1965–1966	Poland	6	(0)

Managerial career
- 1979–1980: Patro Eisden
- 1981–1982: Eendracht Rotem
- 1982–1984: Genk
- 1985–1986: Vitesse
- 1987–1989: Nigeria U23
- 1987–1989: Enugu Rangers
- 1989–1991: Ionikos
- 1992: Górnik Zabrze
- 1995–1996: KFC Eeklo
Medal record
Men's football
Representing Poland
UEFA European Under-18 Championship
Runner-up	1961 Portugal
- * Club domestic league appearances and goals

Janusz "John" Kowalik (born 26 March 1944) is a Polish former football manager and player who played as a striker. A prolific scorer in the European leagues and the North American Soccer League, he was the 1968 NASL MVP.

== Player ==
=== Club career ===
Kowalik was born in Nowy Sącz. In 1968, the owners of the Chicago Mustangs of the North American Soccer League (NASL) signed Kowalik. That season, he led the league in scoring with thirty goals in twenty-eight games. This led to his selection as the league MVP and a first team All Star. At the end of the season, he moved to the California Clippers. However, the NASL lost most of its teams with all west coast teams, but the Clippers, folding. The Clippers decided to leave the NASL, join a local league and exist on playing exhibition games against foreign teams. In January 1969, the team ownership decided to cease operations.

In 1969, Kowalik returned to Europe where he signed with Sparta Rotterdam of the Dutch Eredivisie. In 1974, he moved to NEC for one season.

Kowalik returned to the NASL with the Chicago Sting in 1975, where he played fourteen games, scoring nine goals in 1976.

He then returned to the Netherlands to play with MVV Maastricht.

In 1977, he returned to the Sting where he scored only one goal in an unknown number of games.

In the 1978–79 season he returned to MVV.

=== International career ===
He was capped 6 times for the Poland national team.

== Coaching career ==
Kowalik later coached Vitesse Arnhem, Górnik Zabrze and Rangers International of Enugu.

== Honours ==
Poland U18

- UEFA European Under-18 Championship runner-up: 1961
