= Edwin Olde Riekerink =

Dutch footballer

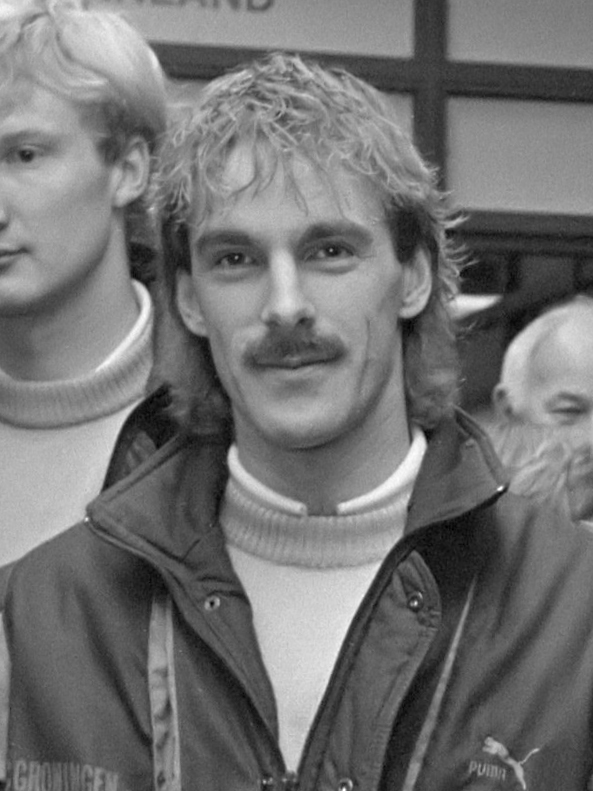
- Edwin Olde Riekerink (1986)

Personal information
- Date of birth: 28 September 1961 (age 65)
- Place of birth: Hengelo, Netherlands
- Height: 1.79 m (5 ft 10 1/2 in)
- Position: Midfielder

Senior career*
Years	Team	Apps	(Gls)
1981–1986	Sparta Rotterdam	131	(24)
1986–1994	FC Groningen	139	(12)
Total		270	(36)
- * Club domestic league appearances and goals

Edwin Olde Riekerink (born 28 September 1961) is a Dutch former professional footballer who played as a midfielder for Sparta Rotterdam and FC Groningen between 1981 and 1994.

His brother Jan was also a professional player.
