= Jan Klijnjan =

Dutch footballer (1945–2022)

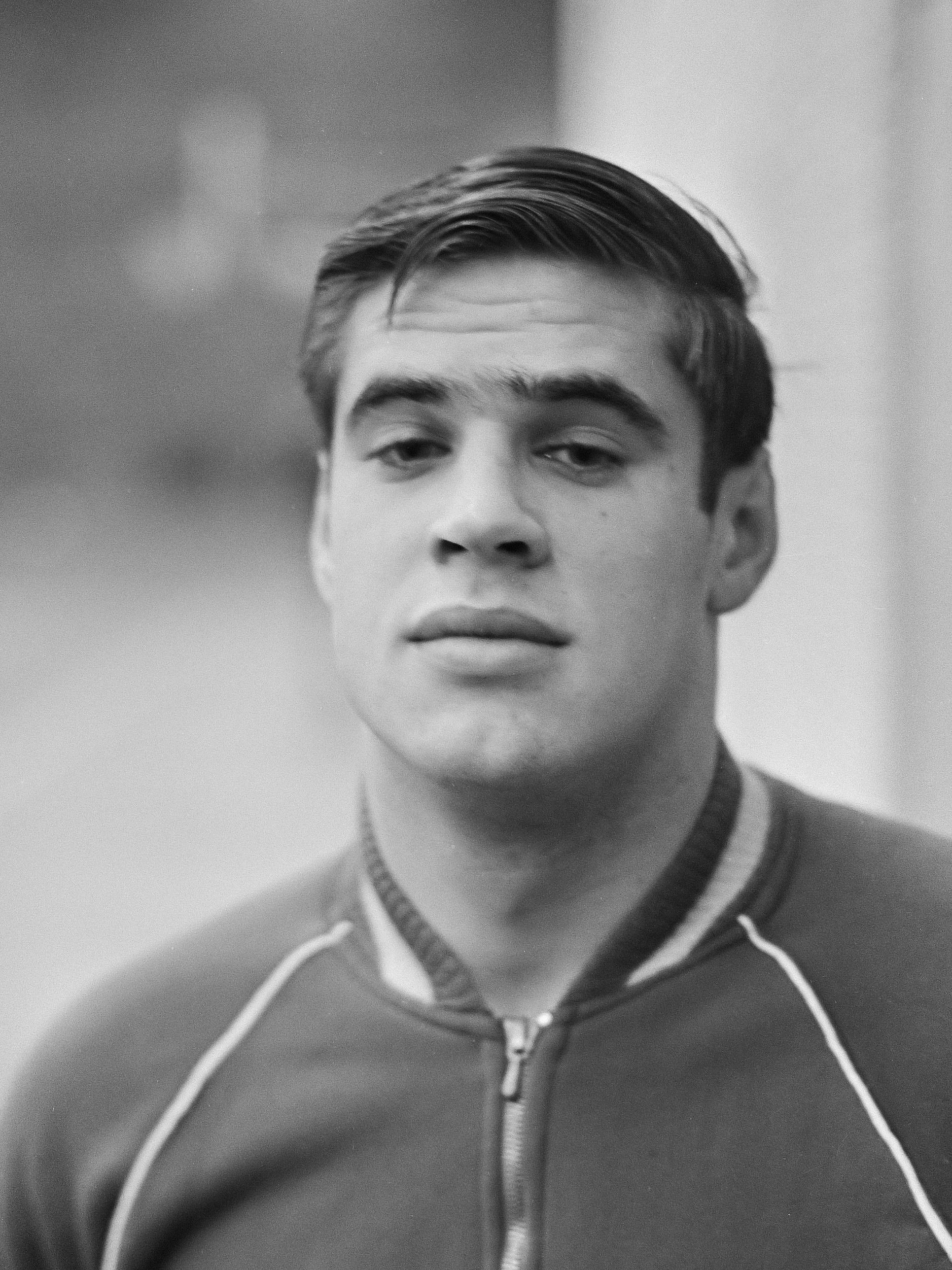
- Klijnjan in 1966

Personal information
- Full name: Johannes Teunis Klijnjan
- Date of birth: 26 February 1945
- Place of birth: Papendrecht, Netherlands
- Date of death: 15 June 2022 (aged 77)
- Place of death: Dordrecht, Netherlands
- Height: 1.76 m (5 ft 9 in)
- Positions: Midfielder; striker

Senior career*
Years	Team	Apps	(Gls)
1963–1968	Dordrecht		(80)
1968–1973	Sparta Rotterdam	144	(54)
1973–1976	Sochaux	104	(17)
1977–1979	Dordrecht	50	(9)

International career
1967–1972	Netherlands	11	(2)
- * Club domestic league appearances and goals

Jan Klijnjan (26 February 1945 – 15 June 2022) was a Dutch professional footballer.

== Career ==
He played as a midfielder or striker. He made 11 appearances scoring 2 goals for the Netherlands national team between 1967 and 1972.
