= Robert Kaiser (footballer) =

Austrian footballer (born 1946)

Personal information
- Date of birth: 27 February 1946 (age 80)
- Place of birth: Donawitz, Austria
- Position: Forward

Senior career*
Years	Team	Apps	(Gls)
1962–1967	WSV Donawitz		
1967–1972	Sturm Graz	115	(42)
1972–1973	Kapfenberger SV		
1973–1975	Sturm Graz	41	(4)

International career
1969	Austria	1	(0)
- * Club domestic league appearances and goals

Robert Kaiser (born 27 February 1946) is an Austrian former footballer who played as a forward. He made one appearance for the Austria national team in 1969.
