= Maria Neira =

Spanish medical doctor, international civil servant and diplomat (born 1962)

Maria P. Neira

Director; Department of Public Health, Environment and Social Determinants of Health; World Health Organization
- In office 2005–2025

Personal details
- Born: 1962 (age 63–64) La Felguera, Langreo, Spain
- Education: University of Oviedo; Université René Déscartes; Université Pierre et Marie Curie; University of Geneva

María P. Neira (born 1962) is a Spanish physician, international civil servant and diplomat, who served as the Director of the Public Health, Environment and Social Determinants of Health Department (PHE) of the World Health Organization (WHO) from 2005 to 2025.

She was nominated by Spain as a candidate for the Director-General of WHO in September, 2026.

== Biography ==
María P. Neira studied medicine and surgery at the University of Oviedo in Asturias, Spain. She specialized in endocrinology and metabolic diseases at the Université René Déscartes in Paris, France. She earned a master's degree in public health and a diploma in human nutrition from the Université Pierre et Marie Curie, in Paris, France. Neira went on to receive the international diploma in Emergency Preparedness and Crisis Management granted by the University of Geneva in Switzerland.

In her early career, Neira was the medical coordinator with Médecins Sans Frontières (Doctors without Borders) in refugee camps in Salvador and Honduras during the armed conflict and the period of instability. She went on to work as Public Health Advisor in the Ministry of Health in Mozambique where she provided clinical care and led public health programmes. Thereafter she served as medical director of the United Nations clinic and UN public health advisor in Rwanda for the UNDP.

María Neira joined the WHO in 1993 as the Coordinator of the Global Task Force on Cholera Control. There she led the global response to outbreaks of cholera and other epidemic diarrhoeal diseases, directly supporting affected countries through coordinating the task force across food safety, emergency preparedness and response, and water and sanitation. From 1998 to 2002, she was the Director of the Department of Control, Prevention and Eradication where she notably secured leprosy multidrug therapy donations through final elimination, as well as accelerated mass drug administration and created partnerships that elevated NTDs on the global health agenda.

She went on to serve as Vice Minister of Health and Consumer Affairs in Spain from 2002 and 2005. During which she presided over the Spanish Food Safety and Nutrition Agency, delivering a food-marketing code, school nutrition plans and national salt reduction.

In 2005, she was appointed Director of the Department of Public Health and Environment at the World Health Organization (WHO). At WHO, Neira pioneered the inclusion of public health in the global climate agenda. She helped create platforms such as the Alliance for Transformative Action on Climate and Health (ATACH) and the Initiative on Climate Action and Nutrition, brought health into the COP process, and convened the first global conferences on climate and health. She led multidisciplinary programmes supporting Member States on climate change, air pollution, energy, environmental emergencies, sustainable health-care facilities and One Health. Her prevention work also contributed to international agreements and conventions on chemical safety, radiation, occupational health, and water and sanitation. Neira directed WHO's work on household and ambient air pollution, which produced the WHO Global Air Quality Guidelines and the report A Vision for Clean Cooking Access for All, aimed at reducing maternal and child mortality. Her scientific leadership extended to the first global reports on electronic waste and health and on biodiversity and health, as well as work on endocrine-disrupting chemicals, clean energy, and low-carbon climate-resilient health facilities.

In November 2019, María Neira joined the High Level Advisory Board of the Lancet Countdown: Tracking Progress on Health and Climate Change.

In September 2026, the government of Spain nominated her as a candidate for the post of WHO Director-General. Neira's candidacy is built around the slogan "health as the compass for a changing world." Her platform makes primary prevention a central priority, alongside strong health systems, quality care and universal health coverage. She pledges to put the best science and health intelligence within every country's reach and to strengthen national capacity to act. On the organization itself, she proposes a more focused, responsive and accountable WHO, with a prioritized programme of work and measurable results. She also promises to foster a culture of excellence, integrity and respect among staff, offering clear direction, trust in their expertise and room to grow.

== Honours and awards ==
- Médaille de l'Ordre du Mérite National by the Government of France
- Spanish National Nutrition Strategy Award
- Mujer Extraordinaria Award by Queen Letizia of Spain,
- Member of the Royal Academy of Medicine of Asturias
- “Inspirational women working towards protecting the environment,” International Women's Day Celebration in Geneva, by UNEP (2016)
