= Nol Heijerman =

Dutch footballer

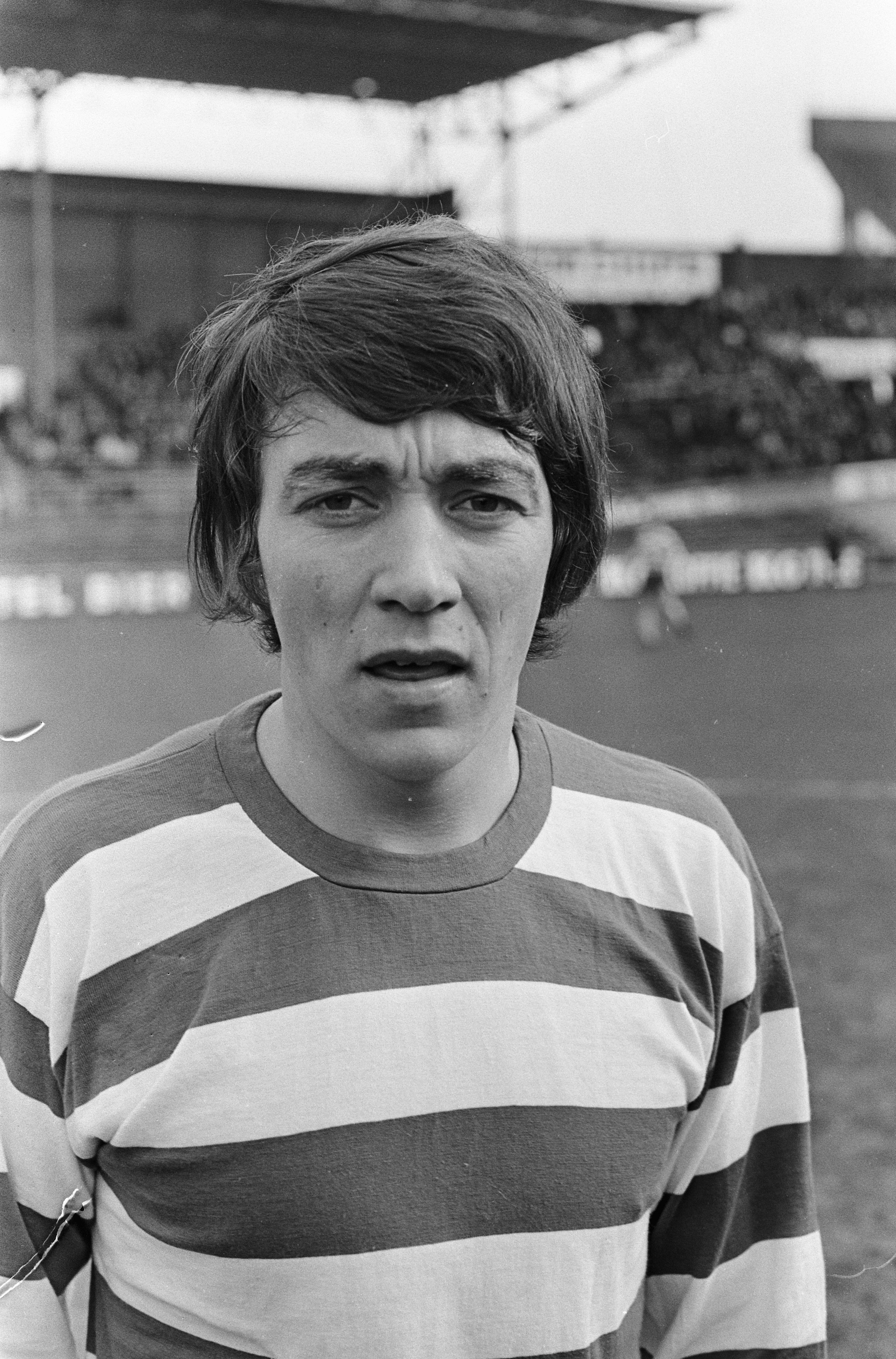

Personal information
- Full name: Arnoldus Heijerman
- Date of birth: 10 October 1940
- Place of birth: Rotterdam, Netherlands
- Date of death: 23 January 2015 (aged 74)
- Place of death: Rotterdam, Netherlands
- Position: Right winger

Youth career
- 1950–1960: RFC Rotterdam

Senior career*
Years	Team	Apps	(Gls)
1961–1963	HVC Amersfoort	38	(13)
1963–1967	Xerxes	111	(63)
1967–1975	Sparta	223	(64)
1975–1976	Excelsior	13	(1)
Total		385	(141)
- * Club domestic league appearances and goals

Arnoldus "Nol" Heijerman (10 October 1940 – 23 January 2015) was a Dutch footballer. Heijerman became a cult hero at Sparta due to his looks and playing style.

== Club career ==
Heijerman played for HVC and Xerxes, with whom he won promotion to the Eredivisie in 1966 and where he played alongside Ab Fafié, Willem van Hanegem, Rob Jacobs and Eddy Treijtel. He made his debut for Xerxes on 25 August 1963 in a 2–2 Tweede Divisie draw with FC Wageningen.

He joined Sparta for 125,000 guilders in 1967.

=== Sparta Rotterdam ===
Dubbed Sparta's Beatle because of his long-haired looks, Heijerman played 223 league games for the Rotterdammers, scoring 64 goals. In the 1967–68 season, he scored 19 goals to become the season's club top goalscorer and he scored 3 goals in 10 European cup matches. He finished his career with a sole season at Excelsior.

In 1971, he won a runners-up medal in the KNVB Cup with Sparta, after losing the Cup final to Ajax.
