= List of foreign La Liga players =

This is a list of foreign players in La Liga. The following players are included:

1. have played at least one La Liga game for the respective club.
2. have not been capped for Spain on any level, independently from the birthplace, except for players of Spanish formation born abroad from Spanish parents and players who have been capped for Spain and also for other national teams.
3. have been born in Spain and were capped by a foreign national team. This includes players who have dual citizenship with Spain.

In bold: players that played at least one La Liga game in 2025–26 season, and the clubs they have played for.

== Africa (CAF) ==
=== Algeria ===
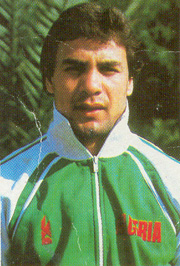
Rabah Madjer in 1986

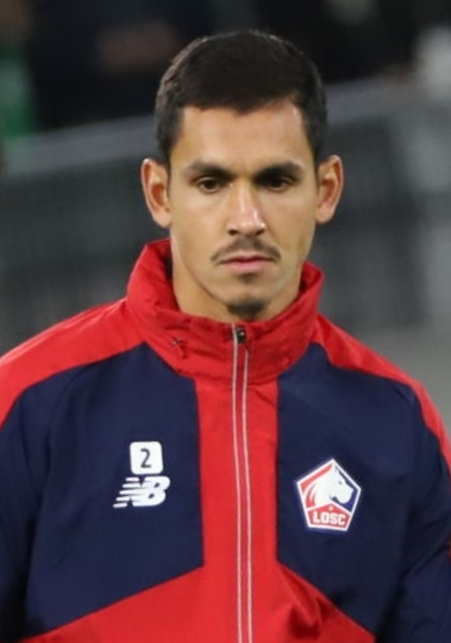
Aïssa Mandi in 2024

- Rachid Aït-Atmane – Sporting – 2015–17
- Djamel Belmadi – Celta – 1999–00
- Ryad Boudebouz – Betis, Celta – 2017–19
- Yacine Brahimi – Granada – 2012–14
- Liassine Cadamuro-Bentaïba – Real Sociedad – 2011–14
- Sofiane Feghouli – Valencia, Almería – 2010–16
- Abdelkader Ghezzal – Levante – 2011–12
- Nabil Ghilas – Córdoba, Levante – 2014–16
- Foued Kadir – Betis – 2015–16
- Mehdi Lacen – Alavés, Racing, Getafe, Málaga – 2005–06, 08–16, 17–18
- Rabah Madjer – Valencia – 1987–88
- **Aïssa Mandi** – Betis, Villarreal, **Levante** – 2016–24, 26–
- Carl Medjani – Levante, Leganés – 2015–17
- Icham Mouissi – Racing – 2002–03
- Abde Rebbach – Alavés – 2023–25
- Moussa Saïb – Valencia – 1997–98
- Hassan Yebda – Granada – 2011–14
- Luca Zidane – Real Madrid, Rayo – 2017–19, 21–22

=== Angola ===
- David Carmo – Oviedo – 2025–26
- Fernando Mendonça – Deportivo – 1962–63 – (Portugal) while active.
- Hélder Costa – Deportivo, Valencia – 2014–15, 21–22
- Jonás Ramalho – Athletic Bilbao, Girona, Osasuna – 2011–13, 17–19, 20–22
- Jorge Mendonça – Atlético Madrid, Barcelona, Mallorca – 1958–70 – (Portugal) while active.
- Manucho – Valladolid, Rayo – 2009–10, 12–16
- Quinzinho – Rayo – 1999–00
- **Randy Nteka** – **Rayo**, Elche – 2021–
- Zito Luvumbo – Mallorca – 2025–26

=== Burkina Faso ===
- Habib Bamogo – Celta – 2006–07
- Aboubacar Bassinga – Las Palmas – 2024–25
- Bakary Koné – Málaga – 2016–17
- Bertrand Traoré – Villarreal – 2023–24
- Jonathan Zongo – Almería – 2013–15

=== Burundi ===
- Mohamed Tchité – Racing – 2007–10

=== Cameroon ===
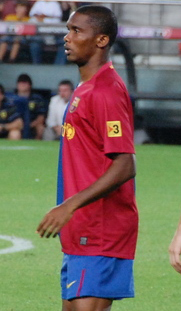
Samuel Eto'o playing for Barcelona in 2008

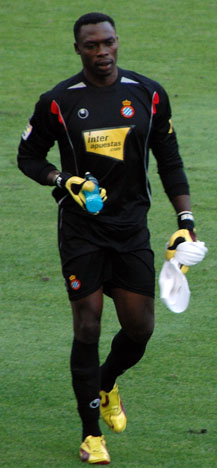
Carlos Kameni with Espanyol in 2009

- Henri Bienvenu – Zaragoza – 2012–13
- **Enzo Boyomo** – Valladolid, **Osasuna** – 2024–
- Jean Marie Dongou – Barcelona – 2013–14
- Patrick Ekeng – Córdoba – 2014–15
- Achille Emaná – Betis – 2008–09
- Yan Eteki – Granada – 2019–22
- Etienne Eto'o – Rayo – 2024–25
- Samuel Eto'o – Real Madrid, Mallorca, Barcelona – 1998–09
- **Karl Etta Eyong** – Cádiz, Villarreal, **Levante** – 2023–
- Geremi – Real Madrid – 1999–02
- Martin Hongla – Granada, Valladolid – 2016–17, 22–23, 23–24
- Raymond Kalla – Extremadura – 1998–99
- Carlos Kameni – Espanyol, Málaga – 2004–17
- Wilfrid Kaptoum – Betis – 2018–20
- Stephane Paul Keller – Alavés – 2020–21
- Daniel N'Gom Kome – Getafe, Mallorca, Valladolid – 2004–05, 06–08
- Lauren – Mallorca – 1998–00
- Raoul Loé – Osasuna – 2011–14, 16–17
- Modeste M'bami – Almería – 2009–11
- Stéphane Mbia – Sevilla – 2013–15
- Albert Meyong – Levante – 2006–08
- Fabrice Moreau – Rayo, Numancia – 1996–97, 99–00
- Dani Ndi – Sporting – 2015–17
- Yvan Neyou – Leganés, Getafe – 2024–26
- Thomas N'Kono – Espanyol – 1982–89
- Aloys Nong – Levante – 2013–14
- **Bil Nsongo** – **Deportivo** – 2026–
- Allan Nyom – Granada, Leganés, Getafe – 2011–15, 18–22, 24–26
- Fabrice Olinga – Málaga – 2012–14
- Alex Song – Barcelona – 2012–14
- Jacques Songo'o – Deportivo – 1996–01, 03–04
- Kévin Soni – Girona, Espanyol – 2017–20
- Karl Toko Ekambi – Villarreal – 2018–20
- Charlie Took – Mallorca – 2012–13
- Pierre Webó – Osasuna, Mallorca – 2003–11
- Pierre Womé – Espanyol – 2003–04
- André-Frank Zambo Anguissa – Villarreal – 2019–20

=== Cape Verde ===
- Bebé – Córdoba, Rayo, Eibar – 2014–18, 18–19, 21–23, 23–24
- **Logan Costa** – **Villarreal** – 2024–
- Dady – Osasuna – 2007–10
- Duk – Leganés – 2024–25
- Héldon – Córdoba – 2014–15
- Sandro Mendes – Hércules, Villarreal – 1996–97, 98–99
- Garry Rodrigues – Elche – 2013–15
- Valdo – Real Madrid, Osasuna, Espanyol, Málaga, Levante – 2001–12, 12–13

=== Central African Republic ===
- Geoffrey Kondogbia – Sevilla, Valencia, Atlético Madrid – 2012–14, 17–23
- Goduine Koyalipou – Levante – 2025–26
- Wilfried Zahibo – Valencia – 2015–16

=== Chad ===
- Azrack Mahamat – Espanyol – 2010–11

=== Congo (Republic of the Congo) ===
- Thievy Bifouma – Espanyol, Almería, Granada – 2010–12, 13–14, 14–16
- Merveil Ndockyt – Getafe – 2017–18

=== DR Congo (Democratic Republic of the Congo) ===
- Cédric Bakambu – Villarreal, Betis – 2015–18, 23–26
- Jonathan Bijimine – Córdoba – 2014–15
- Théo Bongonda – Celta, Cádiz – 2014–17, 22–23
- **Grady Diangana** – **Elche** – 2025–
- Giannelli Imbula – Rayo – 2018–19
- Gaël Kakuta – Rayo, Sevilla, Deportivo – 2014–16, 16–17, 18–19
- Willy Kambwala – Villarreal – 2024–26
- Cedrick Mabwati – Betis – 2013–14
- Omenuke Mfulu – Elche, Las Palmas – 2020–21, 23–24
- Charles Pickel – Espanyol – 2025–26

=== Egypt ===
- **Hamza Abdelkarim** – **Barcelona** – 2026–
- Haissem Hassan – Villarreal, Oviedo – 2022–23, 25–26
- Mido – Celta – 2002–03

=== Equatorial Guinea ===
- Carlos Akapo – Huesca, Cádiz – 2018–19, 20–22
- Javier Balboa – Real Madrid, Racing – 2005–08
- Rodolfo Bodipo – Racing, Alavés, Deportivo – 2002–04, 05–10, 12–13
- Iván Bolado – Racing – 2007–08, 09–11
- Saúl Coco – Las Palmas – 2023–24
- Juan Cuyami – Real Sociedad – 1993–95
- Miguel Jones – Atlético Madrid – 1959–67 – (Spain) while active.
- Omar Mascarell – Real Madrid, Sporting Gijón, Elche, Mallorca – 2012–13, 15–16, 21–26
- Josete Miranda – Getafe – 2020–21
- Emilio Nsue – Mallorca – 2007–08, 10–13
- Jesús Owono – Alavés – 2021–22, 23–25
- Yago Yao – Celta, Recreativo – 2000–03, 05–07
- Benjamín Zarandona – Valladolid, Betis, Cádiz – 1994–00, 01–07

=== Eritrea ===
- Henok Goitom – Murcia, Valladolid, Almería, Getafe – 2007–11, 15–16

=== Gabon ===
- Henry Antchouet – Alavés – 2005–06
- **Pierre-Emerick Aubameyang** – Barcelona, **Deportivo** – 2021–23, 26–
- Lévy Madinda – Celta – 2012–16

=== Gambia (The Gambia) ===
- Bacari – Espanyol – 2011–12
- Biri-Biri – Sevilla – 1975–76, 77–78
- Saidy Janko – Valladolid – 2020–21
- Sulayman Marreh – Granada – 2014–15

=== Ghana ===
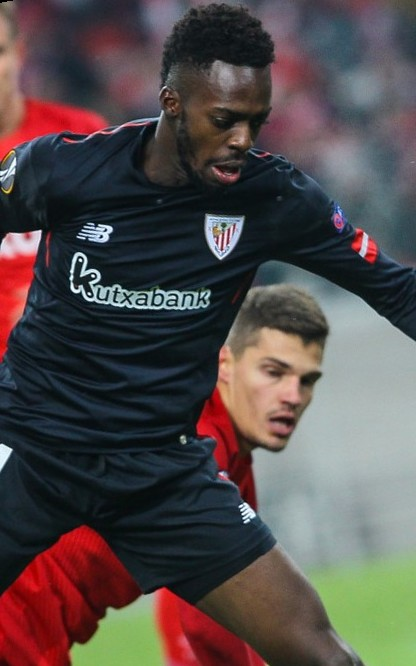
Iñaki Williams playing for Athletic Bilbao in 2018

- Sabit Abdulai – Getafe – 2020–21
- Mohammed Abu – Rayo – 2012–13
- Lumor Agbenyenu – Mallorca – 2019–20
- Joseph Aidoo – Celta, Valladolid – 2019–26
- Amankwaa Akurugu – Getafe – 2020–22
- Anthony Annan – Osasuna – 2012–13
- Christian Atsu – Málaga – 2015–16
- Iddrisu Baba – Mallorca, Almería – 2019–20, 21–24
- Richmond Boakye – Elche – 2013–14
- Derek Boateng – Getafe, Eibar – 2009–11, 14–15
- Emmanuel Boateng – Levante – 2017–19
- Kevin-Prince Boateng – Las Palmas, Barcelona – 2016–17, 18–19
- Richard Boateng – Granada – 2013–14
- Raphael Dwamena – Levante – 2018–19
- Michael Essien – Real Madrid – 2012–13
- Mohammed Fatau – Granada, Rayo – 2013–15
- Kingsley Fobi – Granada – 2020–21
- Bernard Mensah – Getafe – 2015–16
- Abdul Mumin – Rayo – 2022–26
- Sulley Muntari – Deportivo – 2017–18
- Riga Mustapha – Levante – 2006–08
- Thomas Partey – Almería, Atlético Madrid, Villarreal – 2014–21, 25–26
- Abdullah Quaye – Málaga – 2000–01
- Paul Quaye – Espanyol – 2011–12
- Baba Rahman – Mallorca – 2019–20
- Mohammed Salisu – Valladolid – 2019–20
- Jeffrey Sarpong – Real Sociedad – 2010–12
- Kwasi Sibo – Oviedo – 2025–26
- Patrick Twumasi – Alavés – 2018–19
- Mubarak Wakaso – Villarreal, Espanyol, Las Palmas, Granada, Alavés – 2010–13, 15–16, 16–20
- **Iñaki Williams** – **Athletic Bilbao** – 2014–
- Joachim Yaw – Real Sociedad – 1995–97
- **Rockson Yeboah** – **Osasuna** – 2026–

=== Guinea ===
- Alhassane "Lass" Bangoura – Rayo, Granada – 2011–16
- Seydouba Cissé – Leganés – 2024–25
- **Mouctar Diakhaby** – **Valencia** – 2018–
- **Selu Diallo** – **Alavés** – 2026–
- Sory Kaba – Las Palmas – 2023–24
- Alhassane Keita – Mallorca – 2008–10
- Lass Kourouma – Girona – 2025–26
- **Ilaix Moriba** – Barcelona, Valencia, Getafe, **Celta** – 2020–21, 21–
- Souleymane Oularé – Las Palmas – 2000–01

=== Guinea-Bissau ===
- Fernando "Nando" Có – Racing – 1997–98
- **Álvaro Djaló** – **Athletic Bilbao** – 2024–25, 26–
- Houboulang Mendes – Almería – 2022–24
- Formose Mendy – Sporting – 2011–12
- Marciano Sanca – Almería – 2023–24
- Alfa Semedo – Espanyol – 2018–19

=== Ivory Coast ===
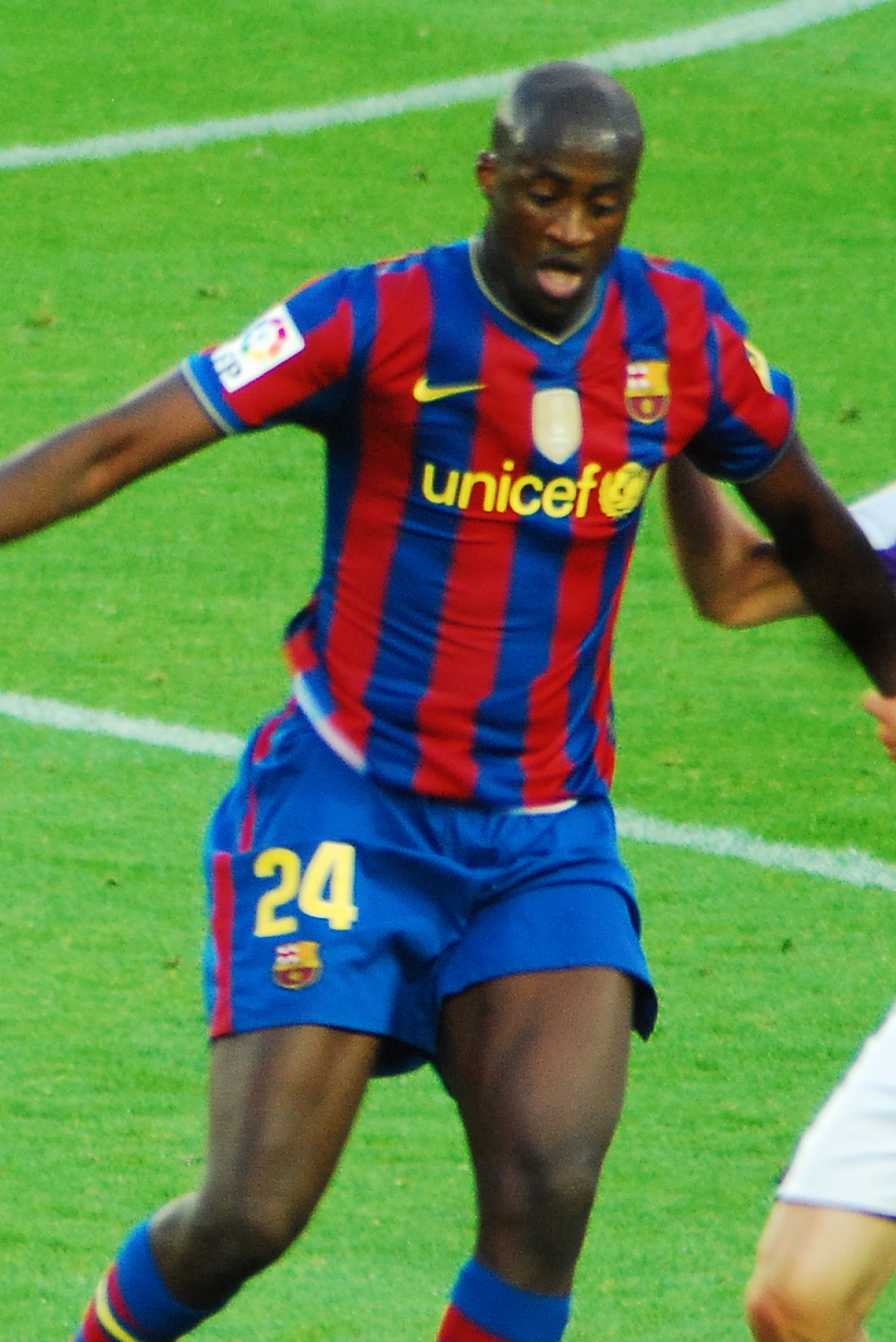
Yaya Touré with Barcelona in 2010

- Kanga Akalé – Recreativo – 2008–09
- Paul Akouokou – Betis – 2020–24
- Bobley Anderson – Málaga – 2013–14
- Victorien Angban – Granada – 2016–17
- Roger Assalé – Leganés – 2019–20
- Serge Aurier – Villarreal – 2021–22
- Ibrahima Bakayoko – Osasuna – 2003–04
- Eric Bailly – Espanyol, Villarreal, Oviedo – 2014–16, 23–26
- Jonathan Bamba – Celta – 2023–25
- Jérémie Boga – Granada – 2016–17
- Arthur Boka – Málaga – 2014–16
- **Yan Diomande** – Leganés, **Real Madrid** – 2024–25, 26–
- Cyril Domoraud – Espanyol – 2002–04
- Cheick Doukouré – Levante – 2017–19, 20–21
- Idrissa Doumbia – Huesca – 2020–21
- Seydou Doumbia – Girona – 2018–19
- Félix Ettien – Levante – 2004–05, 06–08
- Sébastien Haller – Leganés – 2024–25
- Lago Junior – Numancia, Mallorca – 2008–09, 19–20, 21–22, 22–23
- Idrissa Keita – Oviedo – 1998–01
- Franck Kessié – Barcelona – 2022–23
- Arouna Koné – Sevilla, Levante – 2007–10, 10–12
- Mamadou Koné – Racing, Leganés – 2011–12, 16–17
- Serge Alain Maguy – Atlético Madrid – 1993–94
- Christian Manfredini – Osasuna – 2002–03
- Ahmed Ouattara – Extremadura – 1998–99
- **Nicolas Pépé** – **Villarreal** – 2024–
- Romaric – Sevilla, Espanyol, Zaragoza – 2008–13
- Yaya Touré – Barcelona – 2007–10
- Lacina Traoré – Sporting – 2016–17
- **Jean Ives Valou** – **Getafe** – 2026–
- Didier Zokora – Sevilla – 2009–11

=== Kenya ===
- McDonald Mariga – Real Sociedad – 2011–12
- **Job Ochieng** – **Real Sociedad** – 2025–
- Michael Olunga – Girona – 2017–18

=== Liberia ===
- Joel Johnson – Valencia – 2009–10

=== Madagascar ===
- Stéphane Collet – Real Sociedad – 2000–01
- Andy Pelmard – Las Palmas – 2024–25
- Franck Rabarivony – Oviedo – 1998–01

=== Mali ===
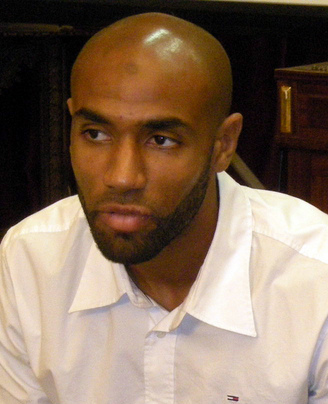
Frédéric Kanouté in 2008

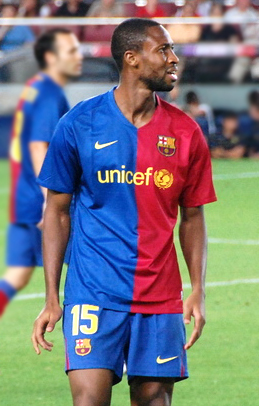
Seydou Keita playing for Barcelona in 2008

- Abdoulay Diaby – Getafe – 2020–21
- Moussa Diakité – Cádiz – 2023–24
- Mahamadou Diarra – Real Madrid – 2006–11
- Mamady Diarra – Cádiz – 2022–23
- Moussa Diarra – Alavés – 2024–26
- **Moussa Diarra** – **Málaga** – 2026–
- Youba Diarra – Cádiz – 2022–23
- **Aliou Dieng** – **Valencia** – 2026–
- Frédéric Kanouté – Sevilla – 2005–12
- Ibrahima Kébé – Girona – 2023–24
- Salif Keïta – Valencia – 1973–76
- Seydou Keita – Sevilla, Barcelona, Valencia – 2007–12, 13–14
- Sidi Yaya Keita – Xerez – 2009–10
- Ibrahima Koné – Almería – 2023–24
- Youssouf Koné – Elche – 2020–21
- Rominigue Kouamé – Cádiz – 2023–24
- Aly Mallé – Granada – 2016–17
- Diadie Samassékou – Cádiz – 2023–24
- Abdoul Sissoko – Granada – 2014–15
- Mohamed Sissoko – Valencia, Levante – 2003–05, 13–15
- El Bilal Touré – Almería – 2022–23
- Hamari Traoré – Real Sociedad – 2023–25

=== Mauritania ===
- Aly Abeid – Levante – 2017–18
- Dawda Camara – Girona – 2025–26
- Moctar Sidi El Hacen – Levante, Valladolid – 2017–19
- Abdallahi Mahmoud – Alavés – 2019–21

=== Morocco ===
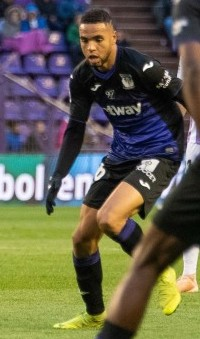
Youssef En-Nesyri playing for Leganés in 2018

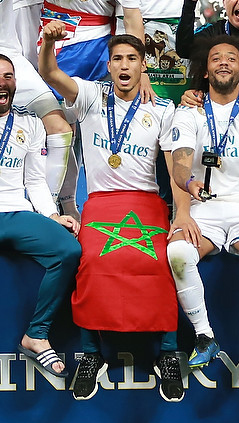
Achraf Hakimi with Real Madrid in 2018

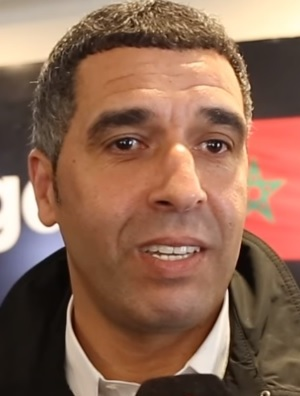
Noureddine Naybet in 2019

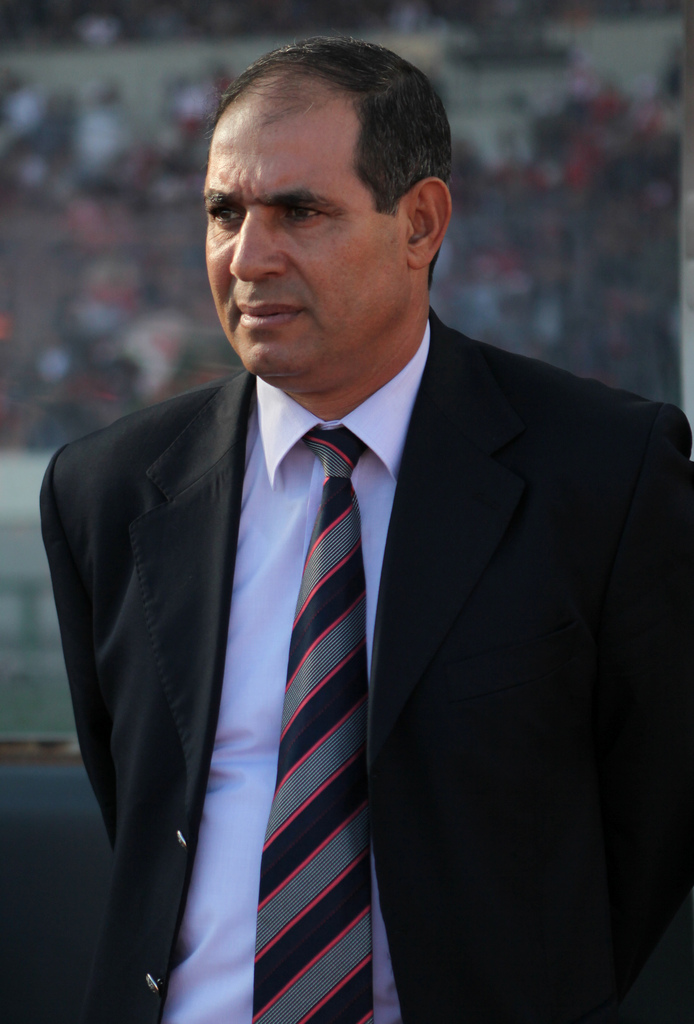
Zaki in 2009

- **Haitam Abaida** – **Málaga** – 2026–
- Abderrazak ben Mohamed – Murcia – 1950–51
- Nabil Aberdin – Getafe – 2023–25
- **Abdel Abqar** – Alavés, **Getafe** – 2023–
- Nayef Aguerd – Real Sociedad – 2024–25
- **Ilias Akhomach** – Barcelona, **Villarreal**, Rayo – 2021–22, 23–
- Selim Amallah – Valladolid, Valencia – 2022–25
- Nordin Amrabat – Málaga, Leganés – 2013–16, 17–18
- Sofyan Amrabat – Betis – 2025–26
- Jaco Azafrani – Atlético Tetuán, Las Palmas, Granada – 1951–52, 55–58
- **Adam Aznou** – Valladolid, **Málaga** – 2024–25, 26–
- Nabil Baha – Málaga – 2008–11
- Abdelaziz Barrada – Getafe – 2011–13
- Salaheddine Bassir – Deportivo – 1997–99
- Ismael Bekhoucha – Getafe – 2024–26
- Abdallah Ben Barek – Granada, Málaga – 1957–58, 62–63, 65–66, 67–68
- Larbi Benbarek – Atlético Madrid – 1948–54
- Zakarya Bergdich – Valladolid – 2013–14
- **Adam Boayar** – **Elche** – 2025–
- Yassine Bounou "Bono" – Girona, Sevilla – 2017–24
- Sofiane Boufal – Celta – 2018–19
- Mehdi Carcela-González – Granada – 2016–17
- Ilyas Chaira – Oviedo – 2025–26
- Sofian Chakla – Villarreal, Getafe – 2019–21
- Walid Cheddira – Espanyol – 2024–25
- Saïd Chiba – Compostela – 1996–98
- Lahsen Ben Mohamed "Chicha" – Atlético Tetuán – 1951–52
- **Brahim Díaz** – **Real Madrid** – 2018–20, 2023–
- **Couhaib Driouech** – **Celta** – 2026–
- **Jones El-Abdellaoui** – **Celta** – 2025–
- Issam El Adoua – Levante – 2013–15
- Youssef El-Arabi – Granada – 2012–16
- Moulay El Ghareff – Tenerife – 1989–90
- **Mourad El Ghezouani** – **Elche** – 2025–
- Munir El Haddadi – Barcelona, Valencia, Alavés, Sevilla, Getafe, Las Palmas, Leganés – 2014–25
- Mounir El Hamdaoui – Málaga – 2013–14
- **Omar El Hilali** – **Espanyol** – 2022–23, 24–
- Salim El Jebari – Atlético Madrid – 2023–24
- Jawad El Yamiq – Valladolid – 2020–21, 22–23
- Nabil El Zhar – Levante, Las Palmas, Leganés – 2011–19
- Youssef En-Nesyri – Málaga, Leganés, Sevilla – 2016–24
- **Abde Ezzalzouli "Ez Abde"** – Barcelona, Osasuna, **Betis** – 2021–
- Hassan Fadil – Mallorca, Málaga – 1986–89
- Fayçal Fajr – Elche, Deportivo, Getafe – 2014–18, 19–20
- Zouhair Feddal – Levante, Alavés, Betis, Valladolid – 2015–20, 22–23
- Rachad Fettal – Almería – 2023–24
- Mustapha Hadji – Deportivo, Espanyol – 1997–99, 03–04
- Achraf Hakimi – Real Madrid – 2017–18
- **Ali Houary** – **Elche** – 2025–26
- Oussama Idrissi – Sevilla, Cádiz – 2020–21, 21–22
- Abderrahman Kabous – Murcia – 2007–08
- Mohamed Ben Mahjoub – Racing – 1950–53
- Hachim Mastour – Málaga – 2015–16
- Mohammed El Yaagoubi "Moha" – Osasuna, Espanyol – 2000–01, 02–08
- Hassan Nader – Mallorca – 1990–92
- Noureddine Naybet – Deportivo – 1996–04
- Azzedine Ounahi – Girona – 2025–26
- Yacine Qasmi – Rayo – 2021–22
- Walid Regragui – Racing – 2004–06
- Chadi Riad – Barcelona, Betis – 2022–24
- Mohamed Riahi – Córdoba, Espanyol – 1962–65
- **Maroan Sannadi** – **Athletic Bilbao** – 2024–
- Oussama Tannane – Las Palmas – 2017–18
- Adnane Tighadouini – Málaga – 2015–16
- Mohammed Timoumi – Murcia – 1986–87
- Nabil Touaizi – Espanyol – 2022–23
- Anuar Tuhami – Valladolid – 2018–20, 22–23, 24–25
- **Yassir Zabiri** – **Racing** – 2026–
- Ezzaki Badou "Zaki" – Mallorca – 1986–88, 89–92

=== Mozambique ===
- Bruno Langa – Almería – 2023–24
- Reinildo Mandava – Atlético Madrid – 2021–25
- Simão Mate Junior – Levante – 2012–16
- Armando Sá – Villarreal, Espanyol – 2004–06

=== Niger ===
- Rahim Alhassane – Oviedo – 2025–26

=== Nigeria ===
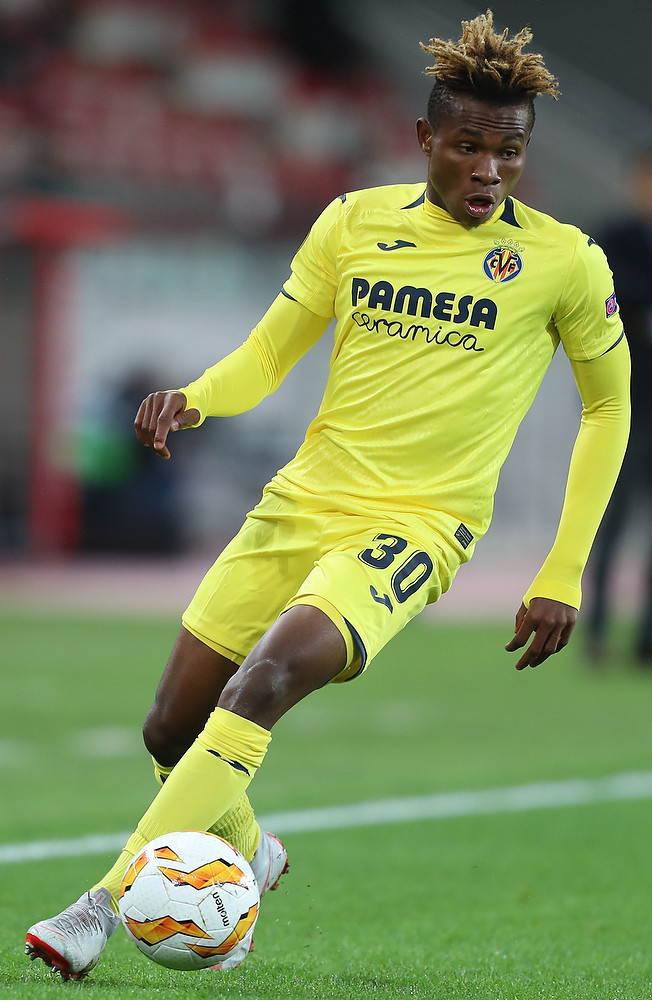
Samuel Chukwueze with Villarreal in 2018

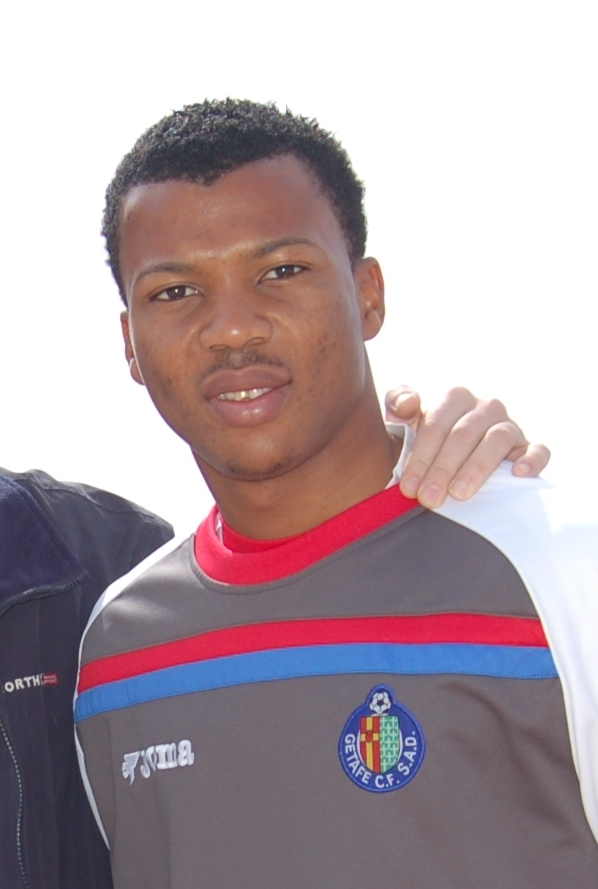
Ikechukwu Uche with Getafe in 2009

- Akor Adams – Sevilla – 2024–26
- Mutiu Adepoju – Racing, Real Sociedad – 1993–00
- Uche Henry Agbo – Granada, Rayo – 2014–17, 18–19
- Wilfred Agbonavbare – Rayo – 1992–94, 95–96
- Festus Agu – Compostela – 1995–96
- Tunde Akinsola – Valladolid – 2022–23
- Ibrahim Alani – Valladolid – 2024–25
- Emmanuel Amuneke – Barcelona – 1996–97
- Emmanuel Apeh – Celta – 2018–19
- Chidozie Awaziem – Leganés – 2019–20
- Ramon Azeez – Almería, Granada – 2013–15, 19–21
- Samuel Chukwueze – Villarreal – 2018–23
- Elderson Echiéjilé – Sporting – 2016–17
- **Chidera Ejuke** – **Sevilla** – 2024–
- Oghenekaro Etebo – Las Palmas, Getafe – 2017–18, 19–20
- Imoh Ezekiel – Las Palmas – 2017–18
- Finidi George – Betis, Mallorca – 1996–01, 03–04
- Brown Ideye – Málaga – 2017–18
- Odion Ighalo – Granada – 2011–14
- Kelechi Iheanacho – Sevilla – 2024–25
- Victor Ikpeba – Betis – 2001–02
- Christopher Kanu – Alavés – 2001–02
- Olarenwaju Kayode – Girona – 2017–18
- Abass Lawal – Albacete – 2003–05
- **Ademola Lookman** – **Atlético Madrid** – 2025–
- Obafemi Martins – Levante – 2012–13
- Emmanuel Nosakhare "Nosa" – Betis – 2012–14
- Kelechi Nwakali – Huesca – 2020–21
- Victor Obinna – Málaga – 2009–10
- Bartholomew Ogbeche – Valladolid – 2007–09
- Christopher Ohen – Compostela – 1994–98
- Samuel Okunowo – Barcelona – 1998–99
- Kenneth Omeruo – Leganés – 2018–20
- Peter Rufai – Hércules, Deportivo – 1996–99
- **Umar Sadiq** – Almería, Real Sociedad, **Valencia** – 2022–
- Moses Simon – Levante – 2018–19
- Isaac Success – Granada, Málaga – 2014–16, 17–18
- Stephen Sunday "Sunny" – Valencia, Osasuna – 2007–09
- **Christantus Uche** – **Getafe** – 2024–26, 26–
- Ikechukwu Uche – Recreativo, Getafe, Zaragoza, Granada, Villarreal, Málaga – 2006–12, 13–15, 15–16
- Kalu Uche – Almería, Espanyol, Levante – 2007–11, 11–12, 14–15
- Nduka Ugbade – Castellón – 1989–91
- Francis Uzoho – Deportivo – 2017–18
- Rashidi Yekini – Sporting – 1995–97

=== Senegal ===
- Abdoulaye Ba – Rayo – 2014–15, 18–19
- Papa Dame Ba – Girona – 2024–25
- Khouma Babacar – Racing – 2011–12
- Ibrahima Baldé – Atlético Madrid, Osasuna – 2009–10, 11–12
- **Pathé Ciss** – **Rayo** – 2021–
- Boulaye Dia – Villarreal – 2021–22
- **Bambo Diaby** – **Elche** – 2025–
- Pape Diakhaté – Granada – 2011–14
- Pape Maly Diamanka – Rayo – 2011–12
- Assane Diao – Betis – 2023–25
- **Alassane Diatta** – **Villarreal** – 2025–
- Baba Diawara – Sevilla, Levante, Getafe – 2011–15
- Famara Diédhiou – Granada – 2023–24
- Papakouli Diop – Racing, Levante, Espanyol, Eibar – 2009–21
- Pape Cheikh Diop – Celta, Elche – 2015–17, 19–20, 22–23
- Mamadou Fall – Villarreal – 2022–23
- **Abdoulaye Faye** – **Celta** – 2026–
- Sekou Gassama – Valladolid – 2022–23
- **Maguette Gueye** – **Racing** – 2026–
- **Pape Gueye** – Sevilla, **Villarreal** – 2022–23, 24–
- Nicolas Jackson – Villarreal – 2021–23
- Dion Lopy – Almería – 2023–24
- Mamadou Loum – Alavés – 2021–22
- Mamadou Mbacke – Villarreal – 2022–23
- Momo Mbaye – Cádiz – 2022–24
- Nobel Mendy – Betis, Rayo – 2024–26
- Guirane N'Daw – Zaragoza – 2010–11
- Alfred N'Diaye – Betis, Villarreal – 2013–14, 15–17, 17–18
- Amath Ndiaye – Getafe, Mallorca, Valladolid – 2017–20, 21–24, 24–25
- Sylvain N'Diaye – Levante – 2006–07
- Mamor Niang – Getafe – 2020–21
- Youssouf Sabaly – Betis – 2021–25
- Arona Sané – Atlético Madrid – 2017–18
- **Arouna Sangante** – **Sevilla** – 2026–
- **Mamadou Sarr** – **Real Sociedad** – 2026–
- Mohamed Sarr – Hércules – 2010–11
- Mamadou Sylla – Espanyol, Alavés, Rayo, Valladolid – 2015–16, 21–22, 23–24, 24–25
- Pape Thiaw – Alavés – 2005–06
- Moussa Wagué – Barcelona – 2018–20

=== Sierra Leone ===
- Juma Bah – Valladolid – 2024–25

=== South Africa ===
- Quinton Fortune – Atlético Madrid – 1995–99
- Tsepo Masilela – Getafe – 2011–12
- Benni McCarthy – Celta – 1999–03
- Nasief Morris – Recreativo, Racing – 2008–10
- Sizwe Motaung – Tenerife – 1996–97
- David Nyathi – Tenerife – 1996–97

=== Togo ===
- Emmanuel Adebayor – Real Madrid – 2010–11
- **Djené Dakonam** – **Getafe** – 2017–

=== Tunisia ===
- Aymen Abdennour – Valencia – 2015–17
- Hannibal Mejbri – Sevilla – 2023–24
- Mehdi Nafti – Racing – 2000–01, 02–05
- Lassad Nouioui – Deportivo – 2008–11
- Abdelkader Oueslati – Atlético Madrid – 2012–13

=== Zambia ===
- Francisco Mwepu – Cadiz – 2022–23

=== Zimbabwe ===
- Tino Kadewere – Mallorca – 2022–23

== Asia (AFC) ==
=== Australia ===
- John Aloisi – Osasuna, Alavés – 2001–06
- Awer Mabil – Cádiz – 2022–23
- **Mathew Ryan** – Valencia, Real Sociedad, **Levante** – 2015–17, 21–22, 25–
- Aurelio Vidmar – Tenerife – 1996–97

=== China PR ===
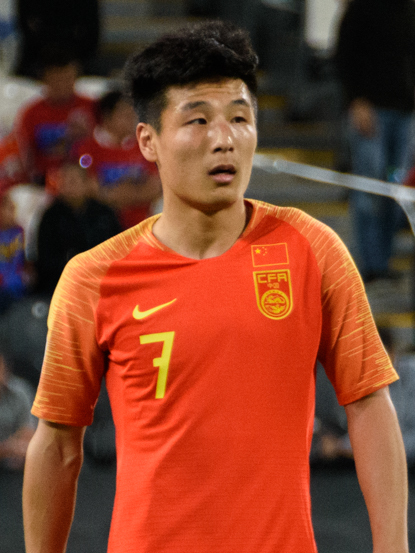
Wu Lei in 2019

- Wu Lei – Espanyol – 2018–20, 21–22
- Zhang Chengdong – Rayo – 2015–16

=== Indonesia ===
- Jordi Amat – Espanyol, Rayo, Betis – 2009–13, 17–19
- **Emil Audero** – **Rayo** – 2026–
- **Jozhua Vertrouwd** – **Rayo** – 2025–

=== Iran ===
- Dennis Eckert – Celta – 2018–19
- Javad Nekounam – Osasuna – 2006–12
- Masoud Shojaei – Osasuna – 2008–13

=== Japan ===
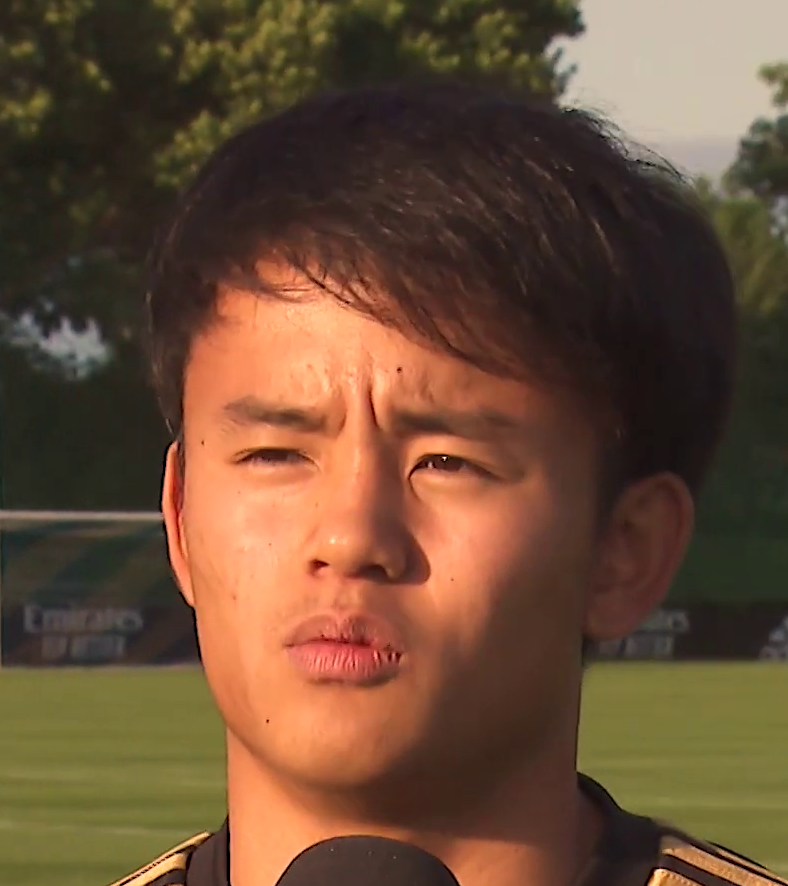
Takefusa Kubo in 2019

- Takuma Asano – Mallorca – 2024–26
- Mike Havenaar – Córdoba – 2014–15
- Hiroshi Ibusuki – Sevilla – 2011–12
- Akihiro Ienaga – Mallorca – 2010–12
- Takashi Inui – Eibar, Betis, Alavés – 2015–21
- Shoji Jo – Valladolid – 1999–00
- Hiroshi Kiyotake – Sevilla – 2016–17
- **Takefusa Kubo** – Mallorca, Villarreal, Getafe, **Real Sociedad** – 2019–
- Yoshinori Muto – Eibar – 2020–21
- Shunsuke Nakamura – Espanyol – 2009–10
- Akinori Nishizawa – Espanyol – 2000–01
- Shinji Okazaki – Huesca – 2020–21
- Yoshito Ōkubo – Mallorca – 2004–06
- **Ryūnosuke Satō** – **Valencia** – 2026–
- Gaku Shibasaki – Getafe – 2017–19

=== Malaysia ===
- **Facundo Garcés** – **Alavés** – 2024–
- Ignacio "Natxo" Insa – Valencia, Villarreal, Celta – 2006–07, 10–11, 12–13

=== Palestine ===
- Omar Faraj – Levante – 2021–22

=== Philippines ===
- Gregorio Ameztoy – Zaragoza, Atlético Madrid, Gimnàstic – 1939–41, 42–46, 47–48
- Ignacio Larrauri – Athletic Bilbao – 1941–42
- Julio Uriarte – Zaragoza – 1939–41, 42–43

=== Qatar ===
- Akram Afif – Sporting – 2016–17

=== Saudi Arabia ===
- Salem Al-Dawsari – Villarreal – 2017–18
- Fahad Al-Muwallad – Levante – 2017–18

=== South Korea ===
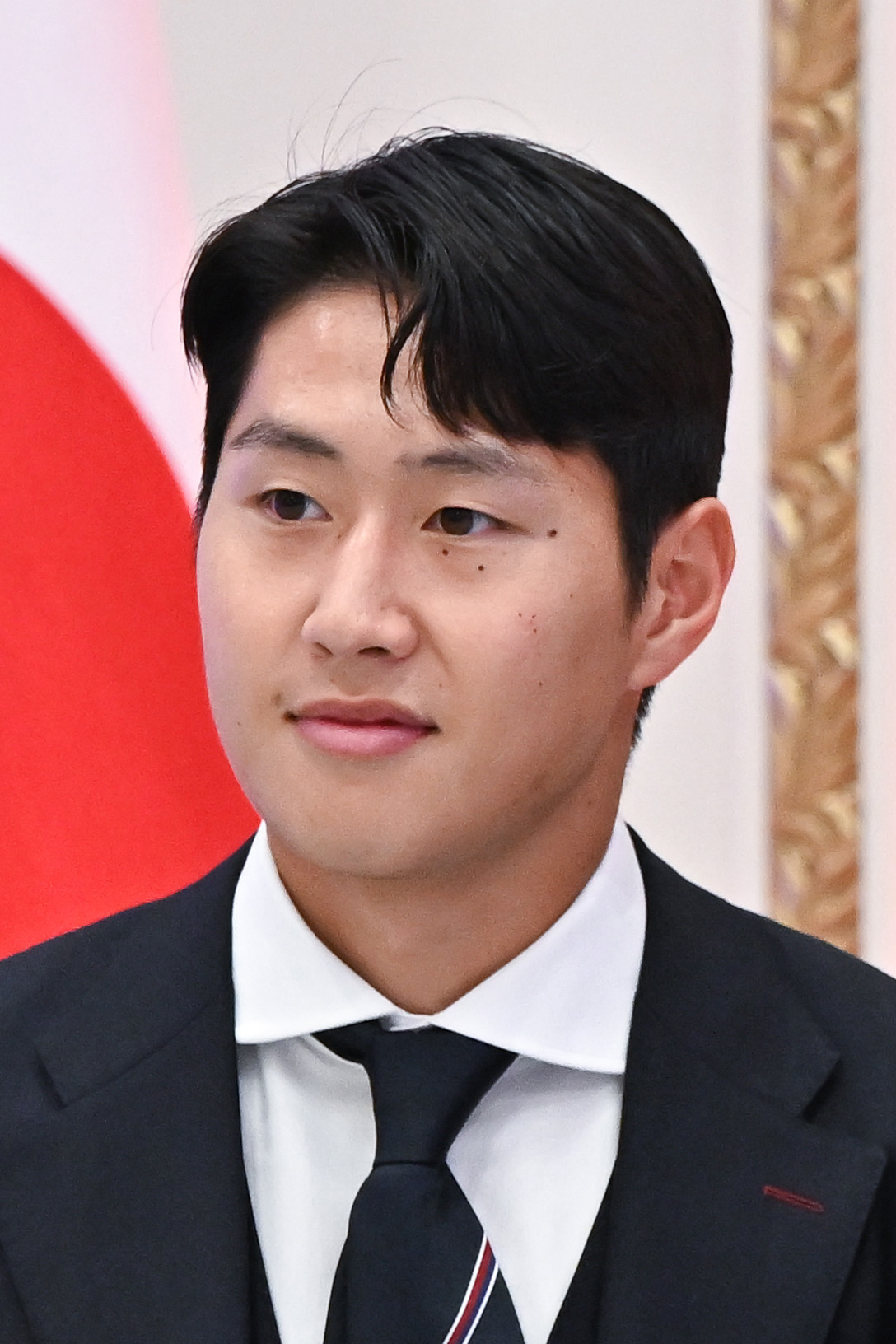
Lee Kang-in in 2019

- Ki Sung-yueng – Mallorca – 2019–20
- Kim Min-su – Girona – 2024–25
- Kim Young-gyu "Kiu" – Almería – 2013–14
- Lee Chun-soo – Real Sociedad, Numancia – 2003–05
- Lee Ho-jin – Racing – 2005–06
- **Lee Kang-in** – Valencia, Mallorca, **Atlético Madrid** – 2018–23, 26–
- Paik Seung-ho – Girona – 2018–19
- Park Chu-young – Celta – 2012–13

=== Syria ===
- Aiham Ousou – Cádiz – 2023–24

=== Thailand ===
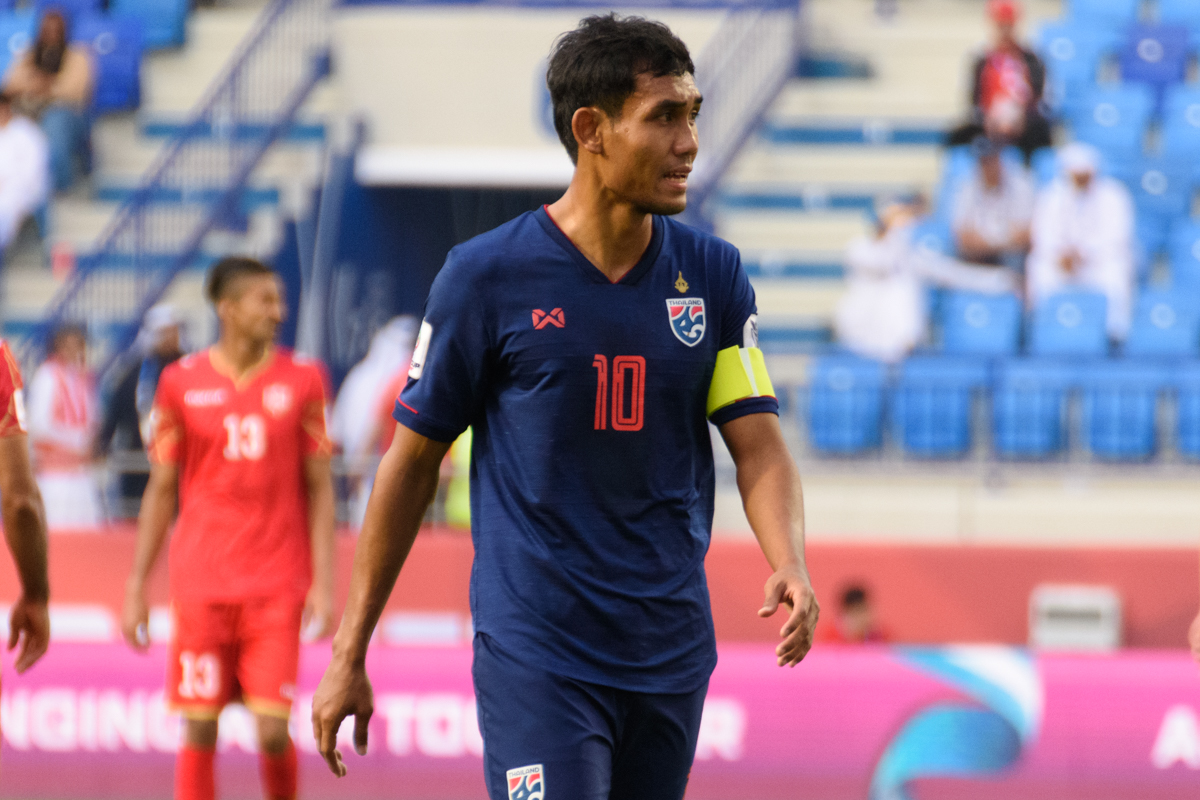
Teerasil Dangda in 2019

- Teerasil Dangda – Almería – 2014–15

== Europe (UEFA) ==
=== Albania ===
- **Iván Balliu** – **Rayo** – 2021–
- Keidi Bare – Espanyol – 2021–23
- **Marash Kumbulla** – Espanyol, Mallorca, **Rayo** – 2024–
- Valdet Rama – Valladolid – 2012–14
- Armando Sadiku – Levante – 2017–18
- Myrto Uzuni – Granada – 2021–22, 23–24

=== Andorra ===
- Lluís Basagaña – Espanyol – 1984–85
- Antoni "Toni" Lima – Espanyol – 1991–92
- Jesús Lucendo – Barcelona – 1989–90

=== Armenia ===
- Varazdat Haroyan – Cádiz – 2021–22
- Aras Özbiliz – Rayo – 2015–16

=== Austria ===
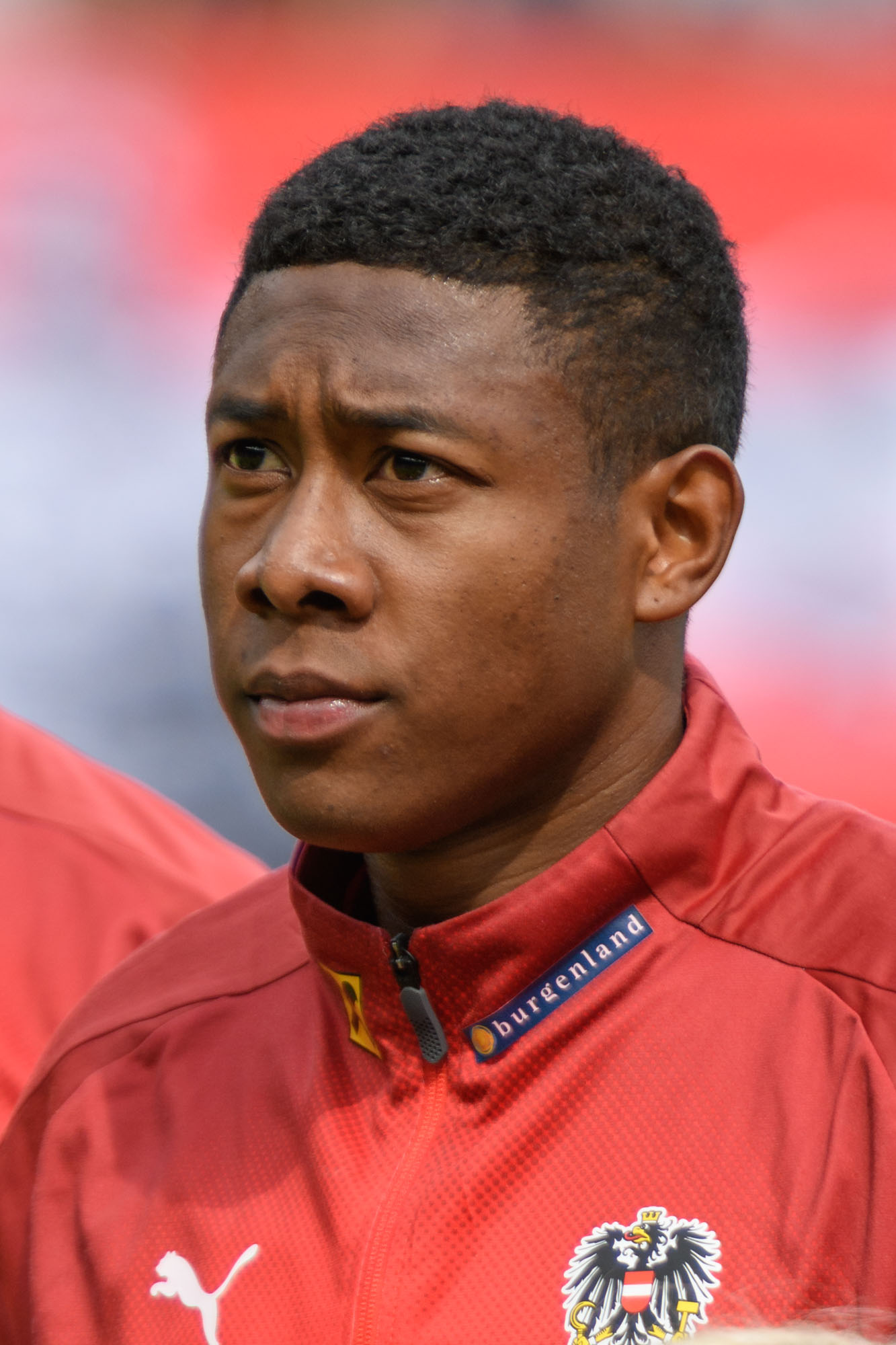
David Alaba in 2018

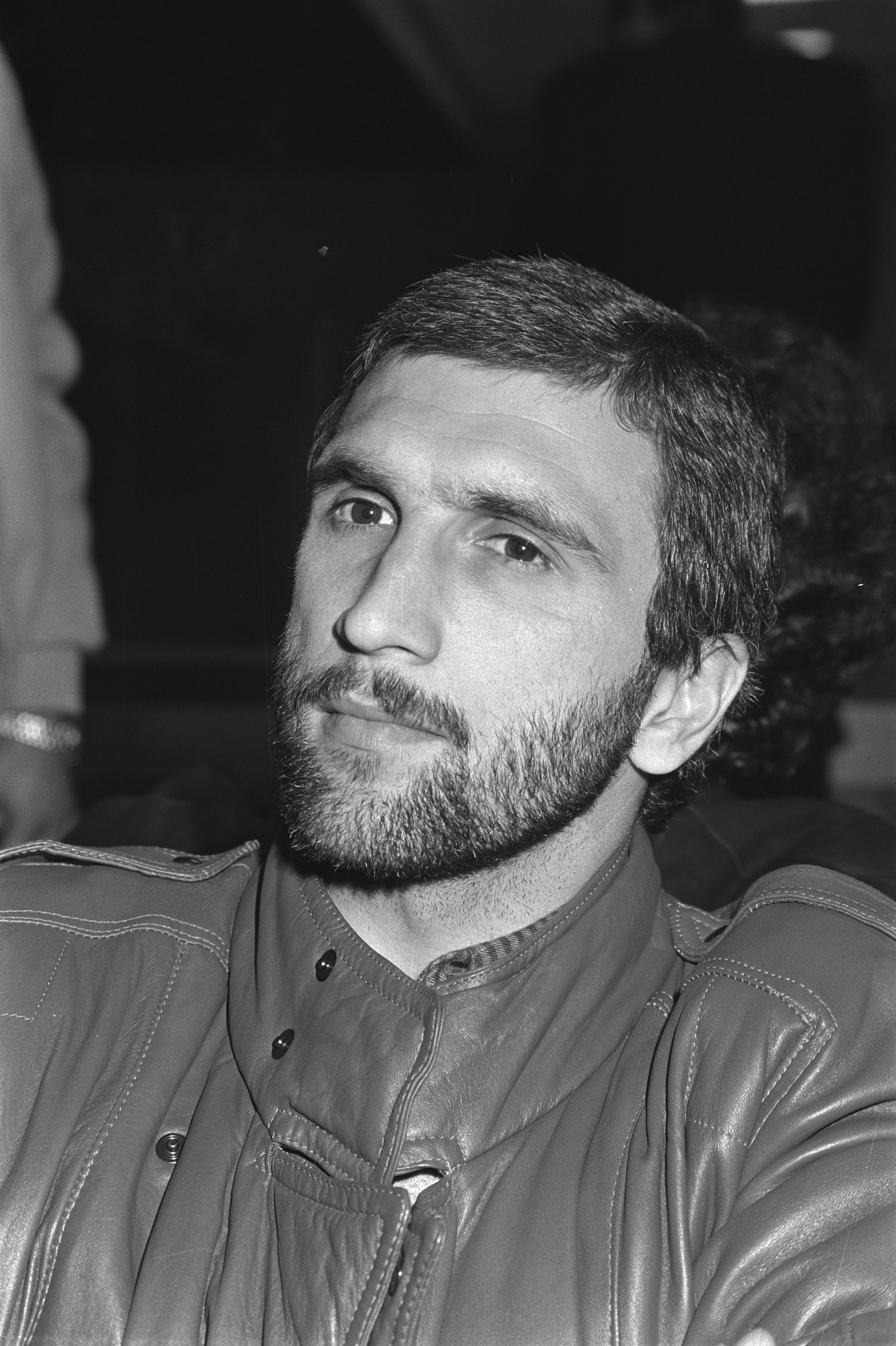
Hans Krankl in 1981

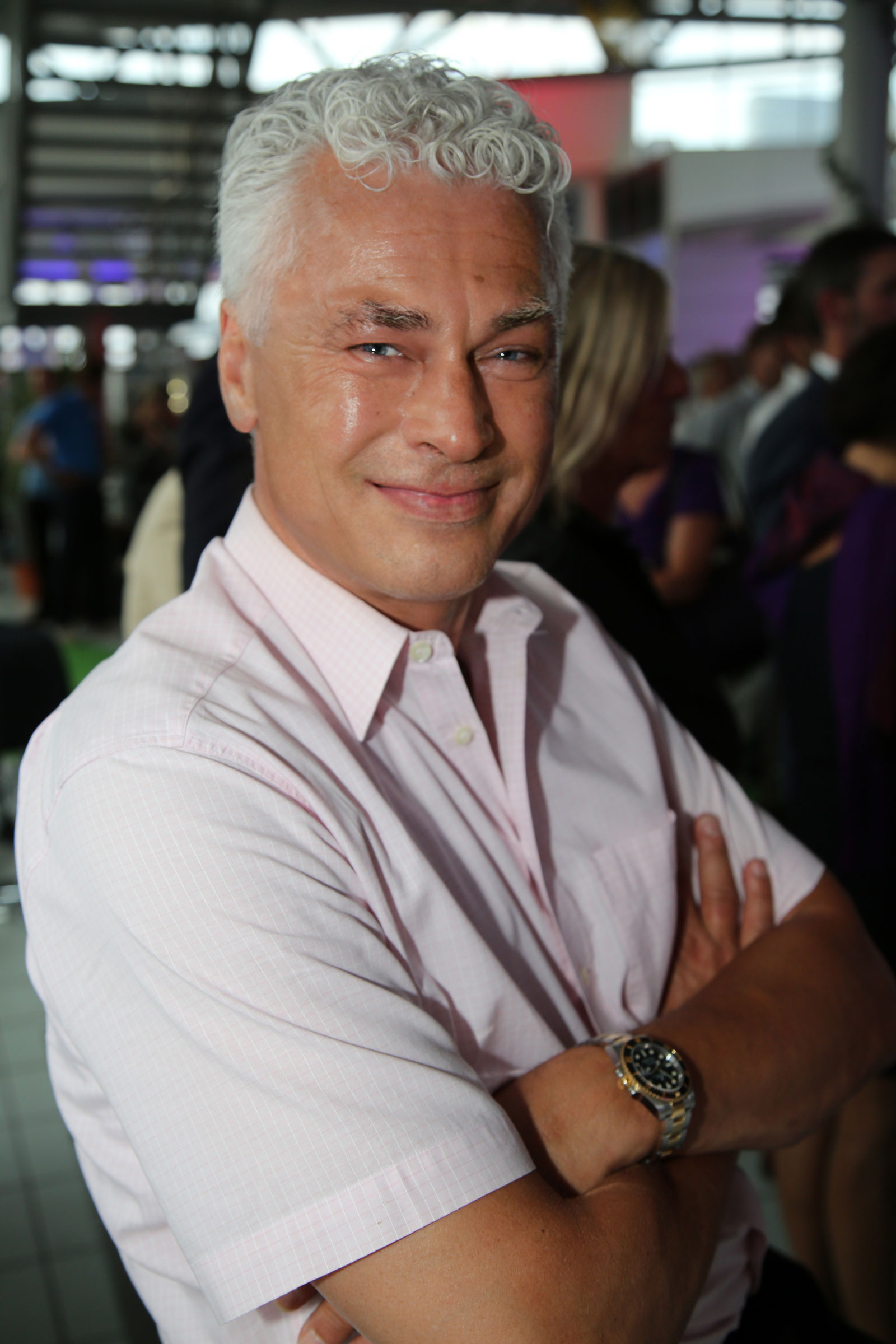
Toni Polster in 2015

- David Affengruber – Elche – 2025–27
- David Alaba – Real Madrid – 2021–26
- Peter Artner – Hércules – 1996–97
- Yusuf Demir – Barcelona – 2021–22
- Florian Grillitsch – Valladolid – 2024–25
- Fritz Hollaus – Atlético Madrid, Mallorca – 1957–58, 60–61
- Andreas Ivanschitz – Levante – 2013–15
- Kurt Jara – Valencia – 1973–75
- Otto Konrad – Zaragoza – 1996–98
- Hans Krankl – Barcelona – 1978–80, 80–81
- Dietmar Kühbauer – Real Sociedad – 1997–00
- **Ifeanyi Ndukwe** – **Levante** – 2026–
- Andreas Ogris – Espanyol – 1990–91
- Thomas Parits – Granada – 1974–76
- Toni Polster – Sevilla, Logroñés, Rayo – 1988–93
- Marcus Pürk – Real Sociedad – 1995–96
- Gerhard Rodax – Atlético Madrid – 1990–91
- Helmut Senekowitsch – Betis – 1961–64
- Kurt Welzl – Valencia – 1981–83
- Maximilian Wöber – Sevilla – 2018–19
- Peter Wurz – Espanyol – 1988–89

=== Azerbaijan ===
- Vali Gasimov – Betis, Albacete – 1994–96
- Eddy Pascual Israfilov – Granada, Eibar – 2014–16

=== Belarus ===
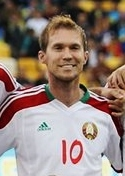
Alexander Hleb in 2015

- Egor Filipenko – Málaga – 2014–16
- Sergei Gurenko – Zaragoza – 2000–01
- Alexander Hleb – Barcelona – 2008–09
- Andrei Zygmantovich – Racing – 1993–96

=== Belgium ===
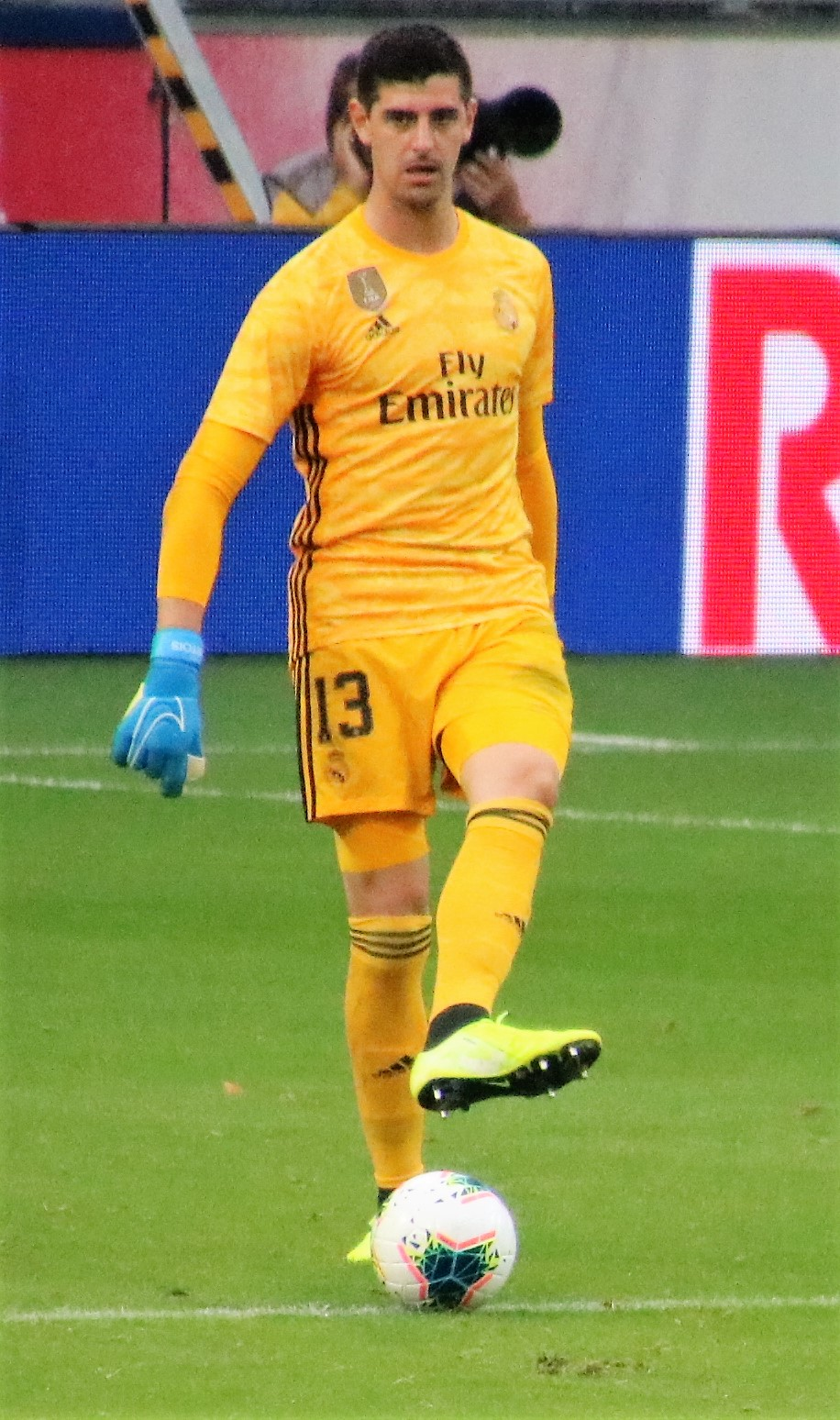
Thibaut Courtois with Real Madrid in 2019

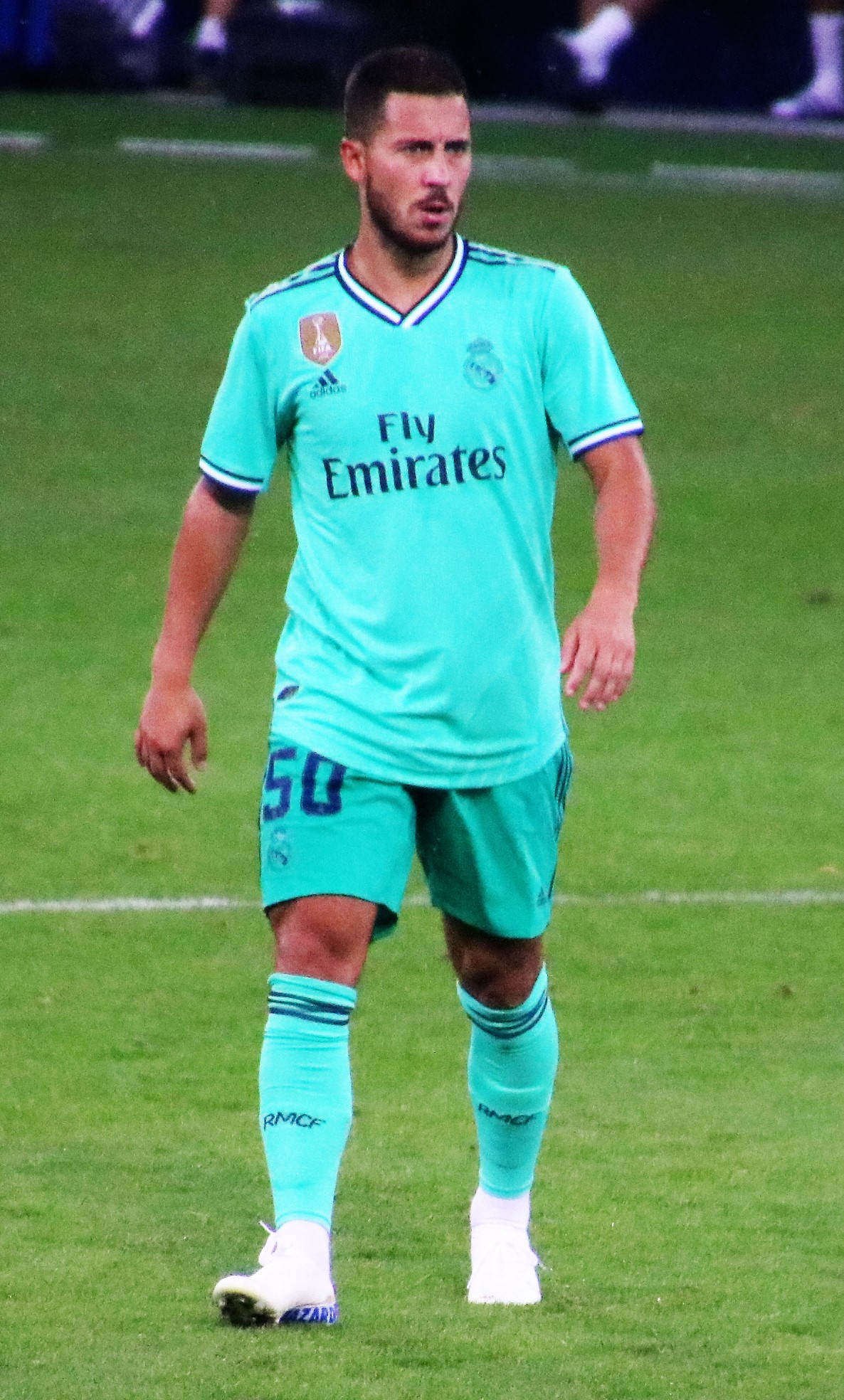
Eden Hazard playing for Real Madrid in 2019

- Toby Alderweireld – Atlético Madrid – 2013–14
- Zakaria Bakkali – Valencia, Deportivo – 2015–18
- Michy Batshuayi – Valencia – 2018–19
- **Jesse Bisiwu** – **Barcelona** – 2026–
- Yannick Carrasco – Atlético Madrid – 2015–18, 19–24
- Maximiliano Caufriez – Valencia – 2024–25
- Gert Claessens – Oviedo – 1999–00
- **Thibaut Courtois** – Atlético Madrid, **Real Madrid** – 2011–14, 18–
- Theo Custers – Espanyol – 1981–83
- Tom De Mul – Sevilla – 2007–09
- Leander Dendoncker – Oviedo – 2025–26
- Landry Dimata – Espanyol – 2021–22
- **Jonathan Dubasin** – **Osasuna** – 2026–
- Ronald Gaspercic – Extremadura, Betis, Albacete – 1998–99, 01–03, 04–05
- Fernand Goyvaerts – Barcelona, Real Madrid, Elche – 1963–68
- Eden Hazard – Real Madrid – 2019–23
- Stanis Idumbo Muzambo – Sevilla – 2024–26
- **Adnan Januzaj** – Real Sociedad, **Sevilla**, Las Palmas – 2017–23, 23–
- Roland Lamah – Osasuna – 2011–13
- Erwin Lemmens – Racing, Espanyol – 1999–01, 02–05
- Dominique Lemoine – Espanyol – 1996–98
- Maxime Lestienne – Málaga – 2017–18
- Dodi Lukebakio – Sevilla – 2023–26
- **Orel Mangala** – **Getafe** – 2026–
- Charly Musonda – Betis – 2015–17
- **Yanis Musuayi** – **Levante** – 2026–
- Cyril Ngonge – Espanyol – 2025–26
- **Lucas Noubi** – **Deportivo** – 2026–
- Marvin Ogunjimi – Mallorca – 2011–12
- Largie Ramazani – Almería, Valencia – 2022–24, 25–26
- Davy Roef – Deportivo – 2016–17
- Albert Sambi Lokonga – Sevilla – 2024–25
- Axel Smeets – Salamanca – 1997–98
- **Lucas Stassin** – **Sevilla** – 2026–
- Siebe Van der Heyden – Mallorca – 2023–25
- Thomas Vermaelen – Barcelona – 2014–16, 17–19
- Arthur Vermeeren – Atlético Madrid – 2023–24
- Axel Witsel – Atlético Madrid, Girona – 2022–26

=== Bosnia and Herzegovina ===
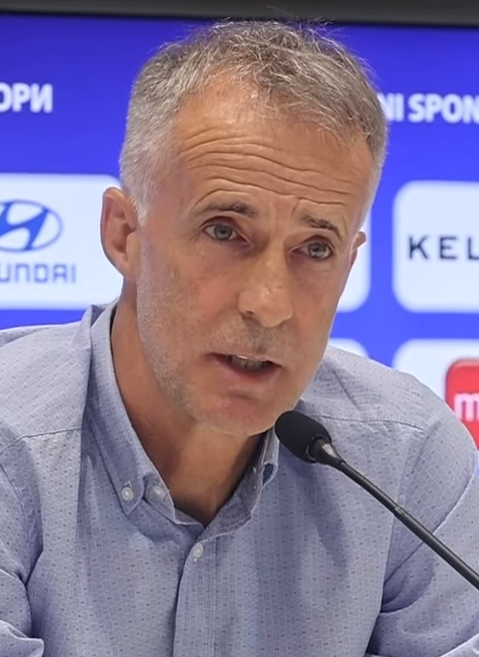
Meho Kodro in 2023

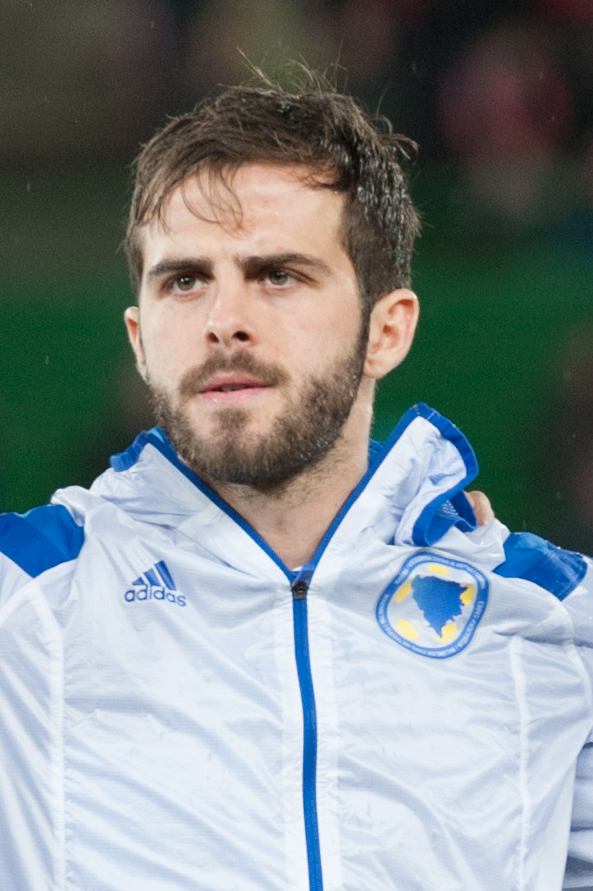
Miralem Pjanić in 2015

- Elvir Baljić – Real Madrid, Rayo – 1999–00, 01–02
- Bernard Barnjak – Castellón – 1990–91 – (Socialist Federal Republic of Yugoslavia) while active.
- Elvir Bolić – Rayo – 2000–03
- Ermedin Demirović – Alavés – 2017–18
- Emir Granov – Rayo – 2001–02
- Nebojša Gudelj – Logroñés – 1994–95
- Vladimir Gudelj – Celta – 1992–99
- Faruk Hadžibegić – Betis – 1985–87 – (Socialist Federal Republic of Yugoslavia) while active.
- Dennis Hadžikadunić – Mallorca – 2022–23
- Izet Hajrović – Eibar – 2015–16
- Sead Halilović – Valladolid – 1995–96
- Mirsad Hibić – Sevilla, Atlético Madrid – 1996–97, 99–00, 02–04
- Mehmed Janjoš – Hércules – 1985–86 – (Socialist Federal Republic of Yugoslavia) while active.
- Predrag Jurić – Real Burgos – 1990–92 – (Socialist Federal Republic of Yugoslavia) while active.
- Kenan Kodro – Osasuna, Athletic Bilbao, Valladolid – 2016–17, 18–21
- Meho Kodro – Real Sociedad, Barcelona, Tenerife, Alavés – 1991–00
- Haris Medunjanin – Valladolid, Deportivo – 2008–10, 14–15
- Dušan Mijić – Espanyol – 1991–92 – (Socialist Federal Republic of Yugoslavia) while active.
- Nikola Milinković – Lleida – 1993–94
- Miralem Pjanić – Barcelona – 2020–21
- Sanjin Prcić – Levante – 2018–19
- Milorad Ratković – Celta – 1992–98
- Dragoljub Simić – Burgos – 1979–80 – (Socialist Federal Republic of Yugoslavia) while active.
- Emir Spahić – Sevilla – 2011–13
- Miroslav Stevanović – Sevilla, Elche – 2012–14
- Ognjen Vranješ – Sporting – 2015–16

=== Bulgaria ===
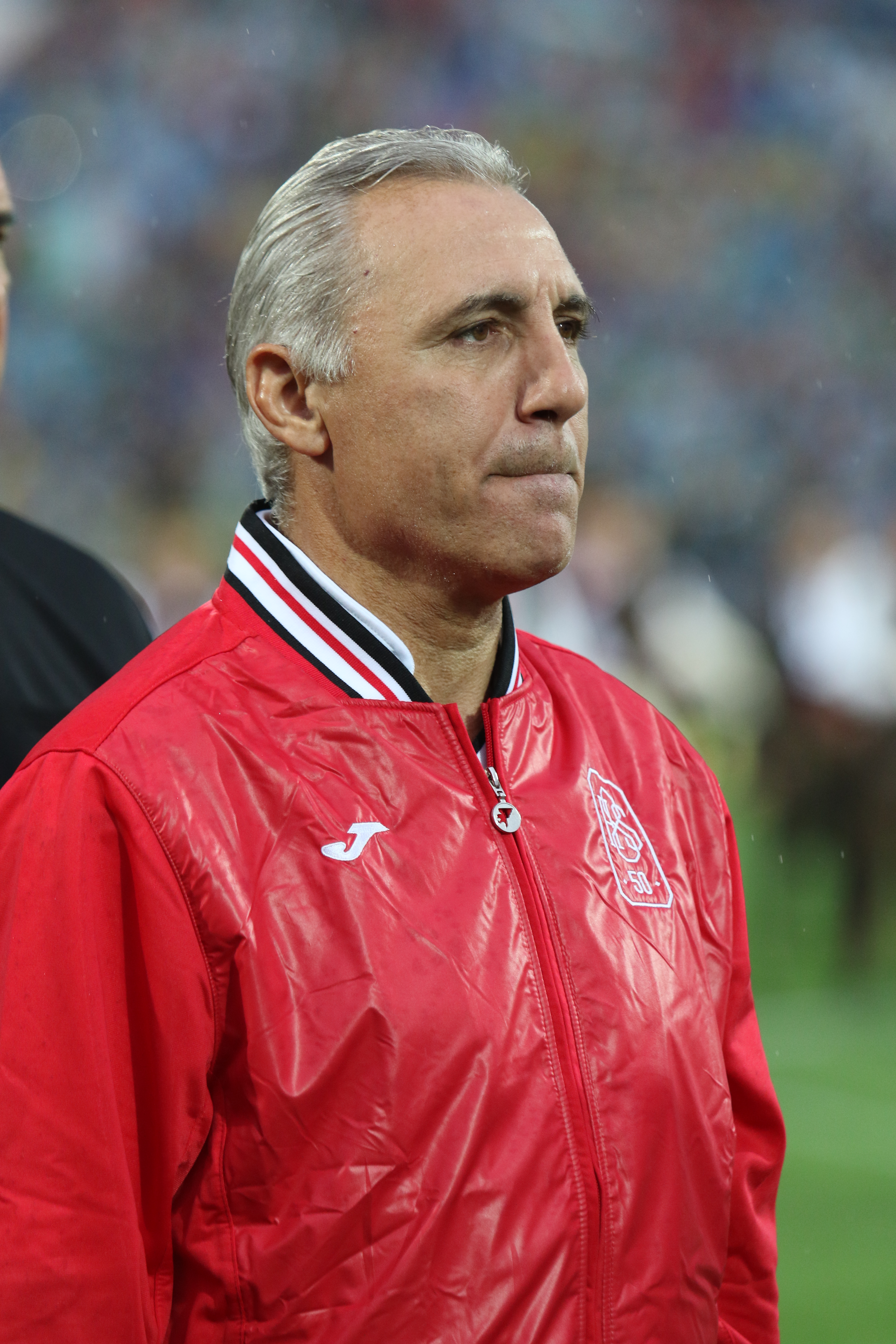
Hristo Stoichkov in 2016

- Ivaylo Andonov – Albacete – 1994–95
- Diyan Angelov – Osasuna – 1991–93
- Georgi Dimitrov – Mallorca – 1990–91
- Blagoy Georgiev – Alavés – 2005–06
- Bozhidar Iskrenov – Zaragoza – 1988–89
- Trifon Ivanov – Betis – 1990–91
- Ilian Kiriakov – Deportivo – 1991–93
- Emil Kostadinov – Deportivo – 1994–95
- Petar Kurdov – Mallorca – 1989–90
- Vladimir Manchev – Levante, Valladolid – 2004–05, 07–08
- Luboslav Penev – Valencia, Atlético Madrid, Compostela, Celta – 1989–99
- Martin Petrov – Atlético Madrid, Espanyol – 2005–07, 12–13
- Nasko Sirakov – Zaragoza, Espanyol – 1988–91
- Hristo Stoichkov – Barcelona – 1990–95, 96–98
- Georgi Yordanov – Sporting – 1990–93
- Velko Yotov – Espanyol – 1994–95

=== Croatia ===
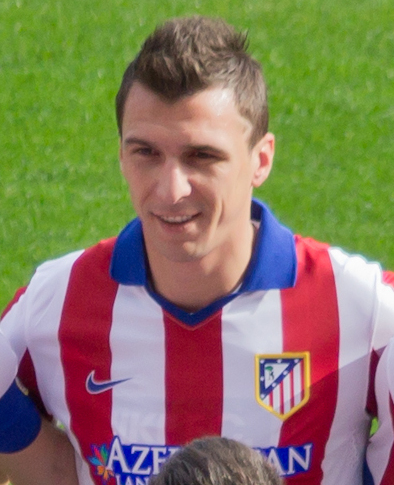
Mario Mandžukić being presented by Atlético Madrid in 2014

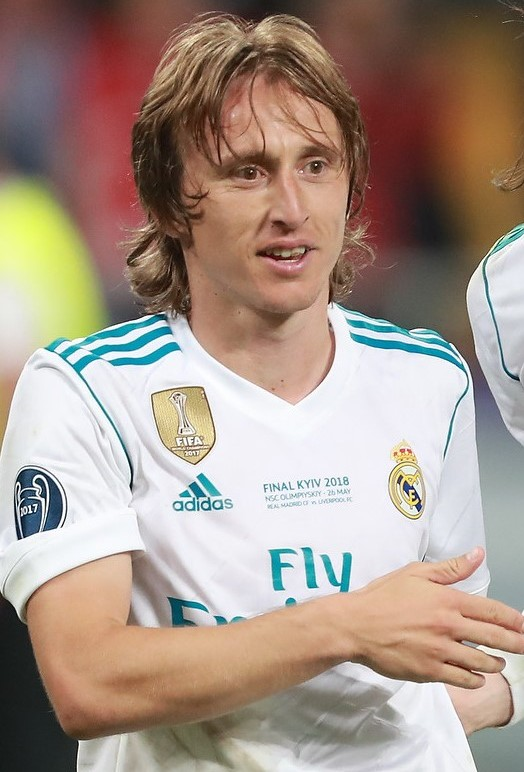
Luka Modrić with Real Madrid in 2018

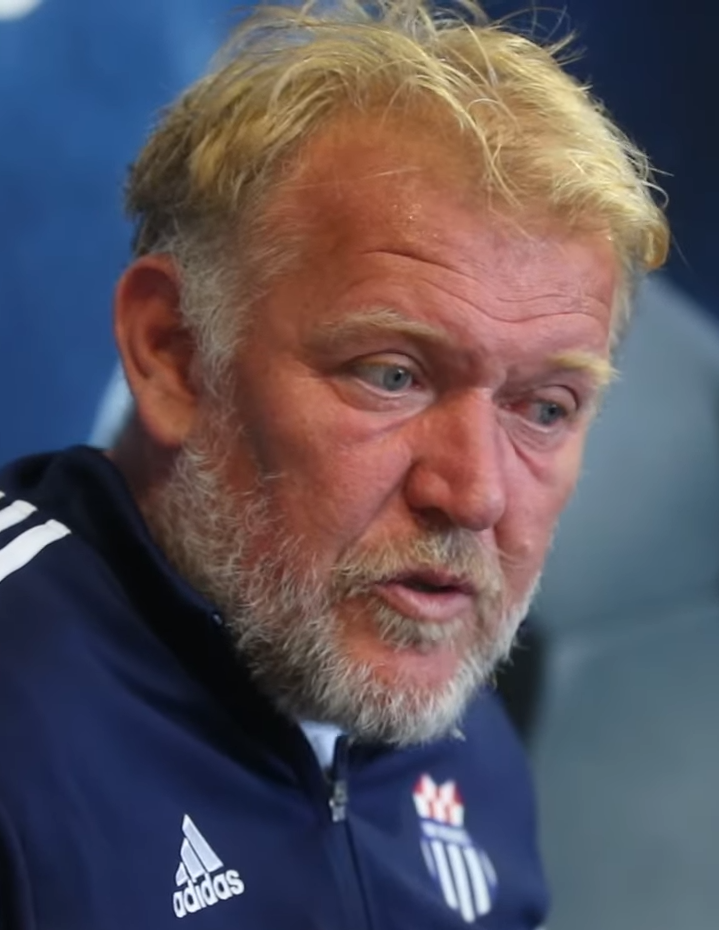
Robert Prosinečki in 2023

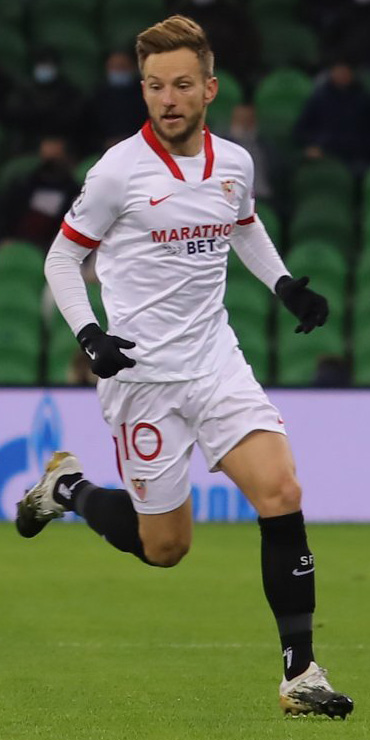
Ivan Rakitić playing for Sevilla in 2020

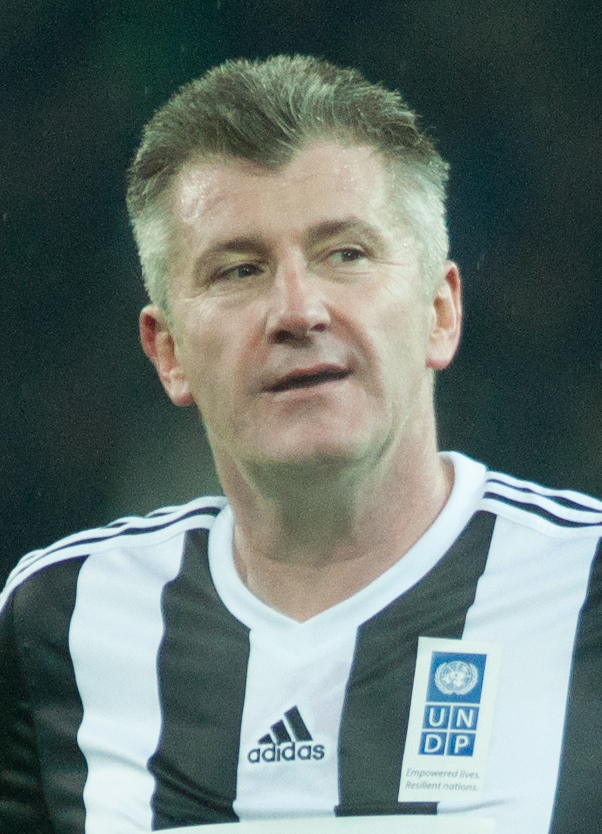
Davor Šuker in 2014

- Stjepan Andrijašević – Celta, Rayo – 1993–94, 95–97
- Aljoša Asanović – Valladolid – 1995–96
- Marko Babić – Betis, Zaragoza – 2007–09, 09–10
- Ivica Barbarić – Real Burgos – 1990–92 – (Socialist Federal Republic of Yugoslavia) while active.
- Borna Barišić – Leganés – 2024–25
- **Matía Barzic** – **Elche** – 2026–
- Mate Bilić – Zaragoza, Sporting – 2001–02, 08–12
- Nenad Bjelica – Albacete, Betis – 1992–98
- Zvonimir Boban – Celta – 2001–02
- Milivoj Bračun – Elche – 1988–89 – (Socialist Federal Republic of Yugoslavia) while active.
- Filip Bradarić – Celta – 2019–20
- Josip Brekalo – Oviedo – 2025–26
- **Ante Budimir** – Mallorca, **Osasuna** – 2019–
- Duje Ćaleta-Car – Real Sociedad – 2025–26
- Duje Čop – Málaga, Sporting, Valladolid – 2015–17, 18–19
- Igor Cvitanović – Real Sociedad – 1997–99
- Vlatko Đolonga – Alavés – 2000–01
- Tomislav Dujmović – Zaragoza – 2011–12
- Nenad Gračan – Oviedo – 1989–93 – (Socialist Federal Republic of Yugoslavia) while active.
- Ivo Grbić – Atlético Madrid – 2022–23
- Alen Halilović – Sporting, Las Palmas – 2015–16, 16–18
- Stefan Hohnjec – Racing – 1978–79 – (Socialist Federal Republic of Yugoslavia) while active.
- Dinko Horkaš – Las Palmas – 2024–25
- Janko Janković – Valladolid, Oviedo, Hércules – 1988–95, 96–97 – (Socialist Federal Republic of Yugoslavia) while active.
- Robert Jarni – Betis, Real Madrid, Las Palmas – 1995–99, 00–01
- Joško Jeličić – Sevilla – 1995–97
- Nikola Jerkan – Oviedo – 1990–96 – (Socialist Federal Republic of Yugoslavia) while active.
- Goran Jurić – Celta – 1992–93
- Ivan Jurić – Sevilla – 1999–00
- Stanko Jurić – Valladolid – 2024–25
- Nikola Kalinić – Atlético Madrid – 2018–19
- Siniša Končalović – Mallorca – 1991–92
- Mateo Kovačić – Real Madrid – 2015–18
- Sergio Krešić – Burgos – 1976–78 – (Socialist Federal Republic of Yugoslavia) while active.
- Ivan Leko – Málaga – 2001–05
- Marko Livaja – Las Palmas – 2016–17
- **Dominik Livaković** – **Barcelona** – 2026–
- Mario Mandžukić – Atlético Madrid – 2014–15
- Danko Matrljan – Logroñés – 1987–88
- Goran Milanko – Cádiz – 1991–93
- Branko Miljuš – Valladolid – 1988–90 – (Socialist Federal Republic of Yugoslavia) while active.
- Luka Modrić – Real Madrid – 2012–25
- Ivica Mornar – Sevilla – 1996–97
- Ante Palaversa – Getafe – 2020–21
- Mario Pašalić – Elche – 2014–15
- Dubravko Pavličić – Hércules, Salamanca – 1996–99
- Alen Peternac – Valladolid, Zaragoza – 1995–01
- Stipe Pletikosa – Deportivo – 2015–16
- Nenad Pralija – Espanyol – 1996–99
- Robert Prosinečki – Real Madrid, Oviedo, Barcelona, Sevilla – 1991–97
- Josip Radošević – Eibar – 2015–16
- Ivan Rakitić – Sevilla, Barcelona – 2010–24
- Mauro Ravnić – Valladolid, Lleida – 1988–92, 93–94 – (Socialist Federal Republic of Yugoslavia) while active.
- Marko Rog – Sevilla – 2018–19
- Sammir – Getafe – 2013–15
- Daniel Šarić – Sporting – 1993–95
- Dragan Skočić – Compostela – 1994–96
- Mario Stanić – Sporting – 1993–94
- Igor Štimac – Cádiz – 1992–93
- **Luka Sučić** – **Real Sociedad** – 2024–
- Davor Šuker – Sevilla, Real Madrid – 1991–99
- Ivica Šurjak – Zaragoza – 1984–85
- Zoran Varvodić – Cádiz – 1992–93
- Goran Vlaović – Valencia – 1996–00
- Šime Vrsaljko – Atlético Madrid – 2016–18, 19–22
- Goran Vučević – Barcelona, Mérida – 1992–93, 95–96
- Jurica Vučko – Alavés – 2000–02
- Zoran Vulić – Mallorca – 1989–91 – (Socialist Federal Republic of Yugoslavia) while active.

=== Czech Republic ===
- Radek Bejbl – Atlético Madrid – 1996–00
- Michal Bílek – Betis – 1990–91 – (Czechoslovakia) while active.
- Yanko Daucik – Betis, Real Madrid, Espanyol – 1960–64, 70–71 – (Czechoslovakia) while active.
- Jiří Hanke – Barcelona, Condal – 1952–57 – (Czechoslovakia) while active.
- Pavel Hapal – Tenerife – 1995–96
- Jakub Jankto – Getafe – 2021–22
- Petr Kouba – Deportivo – 1996–97, 99–00
- Alex Král – Espanyol – 2024–25
- Ladislav Krejčí – Girona – 2024–26
- **Jiří Letáček** – **Getafe** – 2026–
- Jaroslav Plašil – Osasuna – 2007–09
- Tomáš Ujfaluši – Atlético Madrid – 2008–11
- Tomáš Vaclík – Sevilla – 2018–21

=== Denmark ===
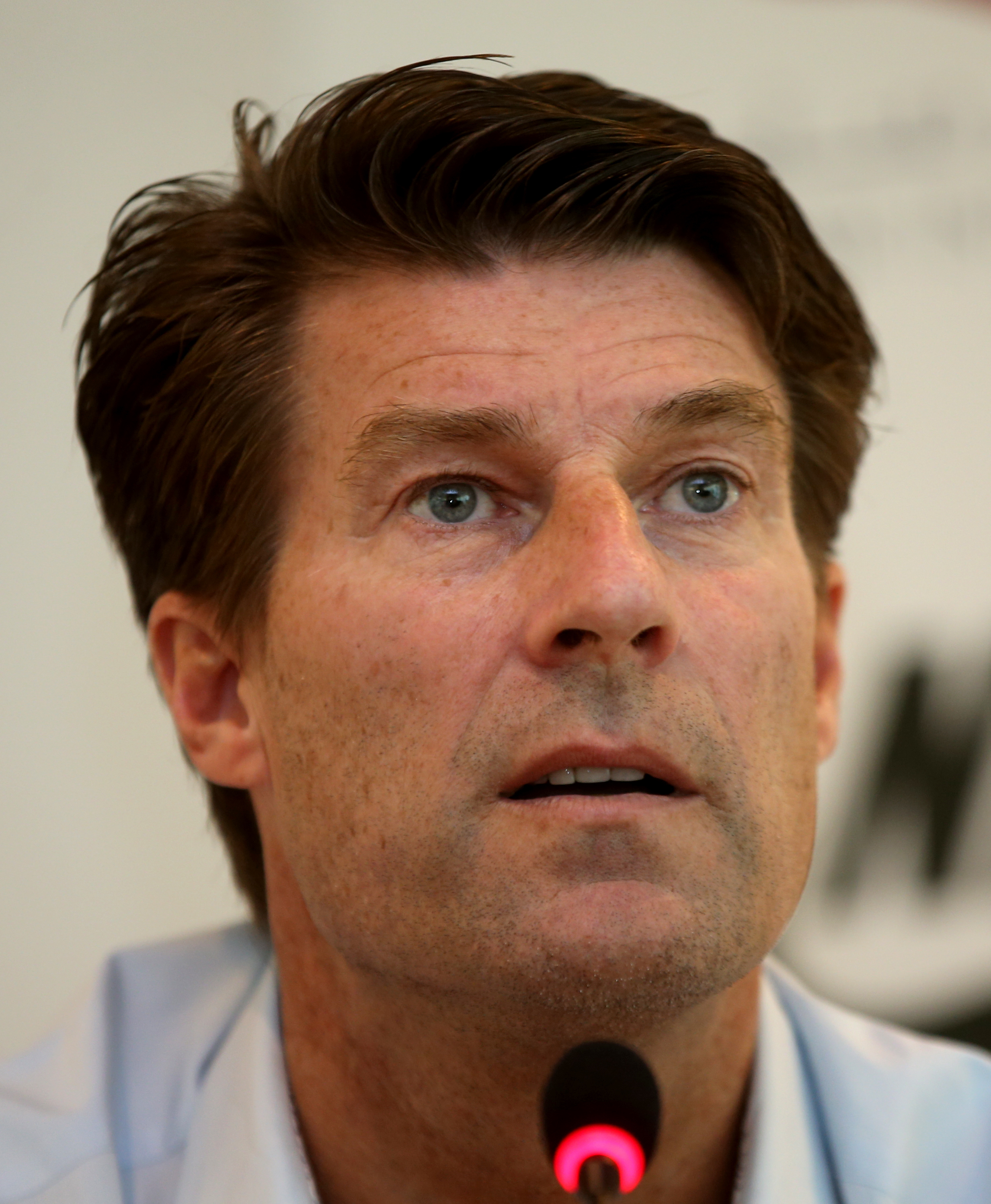
Michael Laudrup in 2016

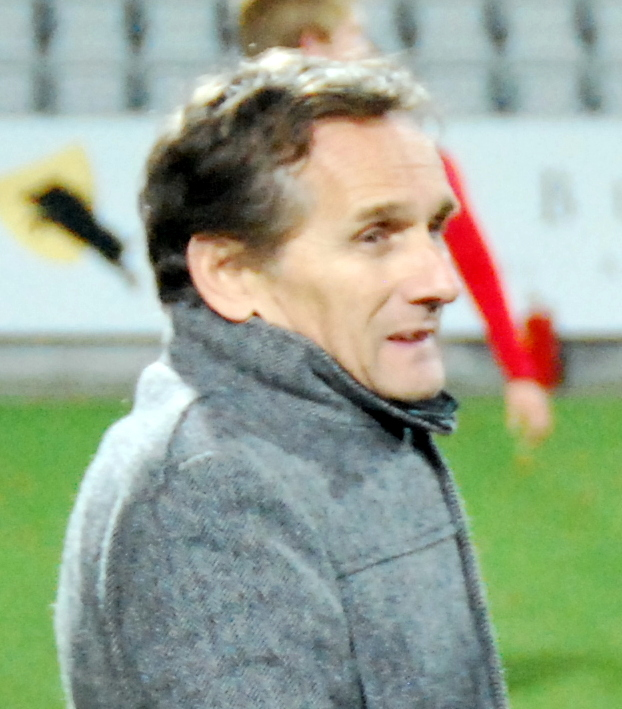
Allan Simonsen in 2012

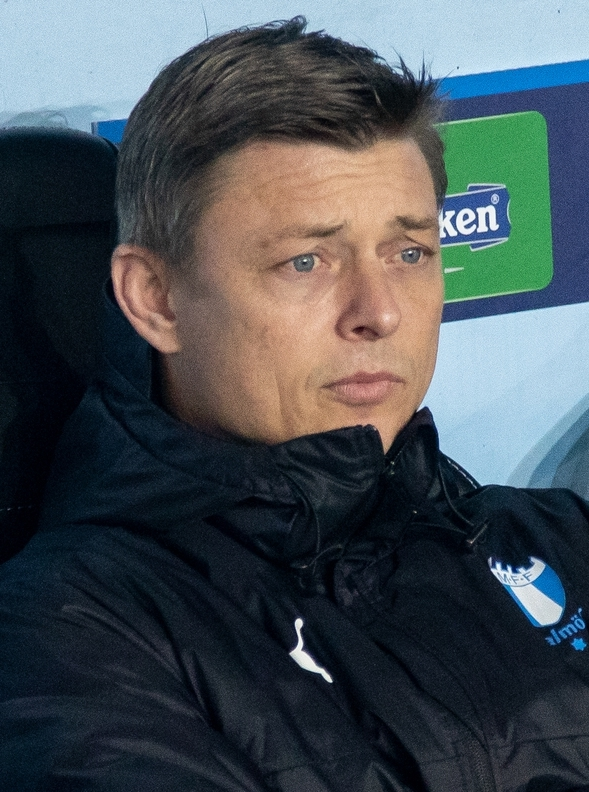
Jon Dahl Tomasson in 2021

- Søren Andersen – Lleida – 1993–94
- Stephan Andersen – Betis – 2013–14
- Frank Arnesen – Valencia – 1981–82
- **Jonathan Asp Jensen** – **Deportivo** – 2026–
- Nicki Bille – Villarreal, Rayo – 2010–11, 12–13
- Martin Braithwaite – Leganés, Barcelona, Espanyol – 2018–23
- Kenneth Brylle – Sabadell – 1986–87
- **Andreas Christensen** – **Barcelona** – 2022–
- Bent Christensen – Compostela – 1994–97
- Tommy Christensen – Elche – 1984–85
- Thomas Delaney – Sevilla – 2021–23
- Kasper Dolberg – Sevilla – 2022–23
- Morten Donnerup – Racing – 1985–86
- Riza Durmisi – Betis – 2016–18
- Ronnie Ekelund – Barcelona – 1993–94
- Thomas Gravesen – Real Madrid – 2004–06
- Jesper Grønkjær – Atlético Madrid – 2004–05
- René Hansen – Las Palmas – 1986–87
- **Morten Hjulmand** – **Atlético Madrid** – 2026–
- Andrew Hjulsager – Celta – 2016–18, 18–19
- Michael Jakobsen – Almería – 2010–11
- Daniel Jensen – Murcia – 2003–04
- Henning Jensen – Real Madrid – 1976–79
- Mathias Jensen – Celta – 2018–19
- Jens Jønsson – Cádiz – 2020–22
- Filip Jörgensen – Villarreal – 2022–24
- Simon Kjær – Sevilla – 2017–19
- Michael Krohn-Dehli – Celta, Sevilla, Deportivo – 2012–18
- Michael Laudrup – Barcelona, Real Madrid – 1989–96
- John Lauridsen – Espanyol, Málaga – 1981–90
- Børge Mathiesen – Racing – 1950–51
- Peter Møller – Oviedo – 1998–01
- Patrick Mtiliga – Málaga – 2009–11
- Michael Pedersen – Osasuna – 1985–87
- Christian Poulsen – Sevilla – 2006–08
- Thomas Rytter – Sevilla – 1996–97
- Allan Simonsen – Barcelona – 1979–82
- Pione Sisto – Celta – 2016–20
- Morten Skoubo – Real Sociedad – 2005–07
- Kris Stadsgaard – Málaga – 2010–11
- Jon Dahl Tomasson – Villarreal – 2006–08
- Daniel Wass – Celta, Valencia, Atlético Madrid – 2015–22

=== England ===
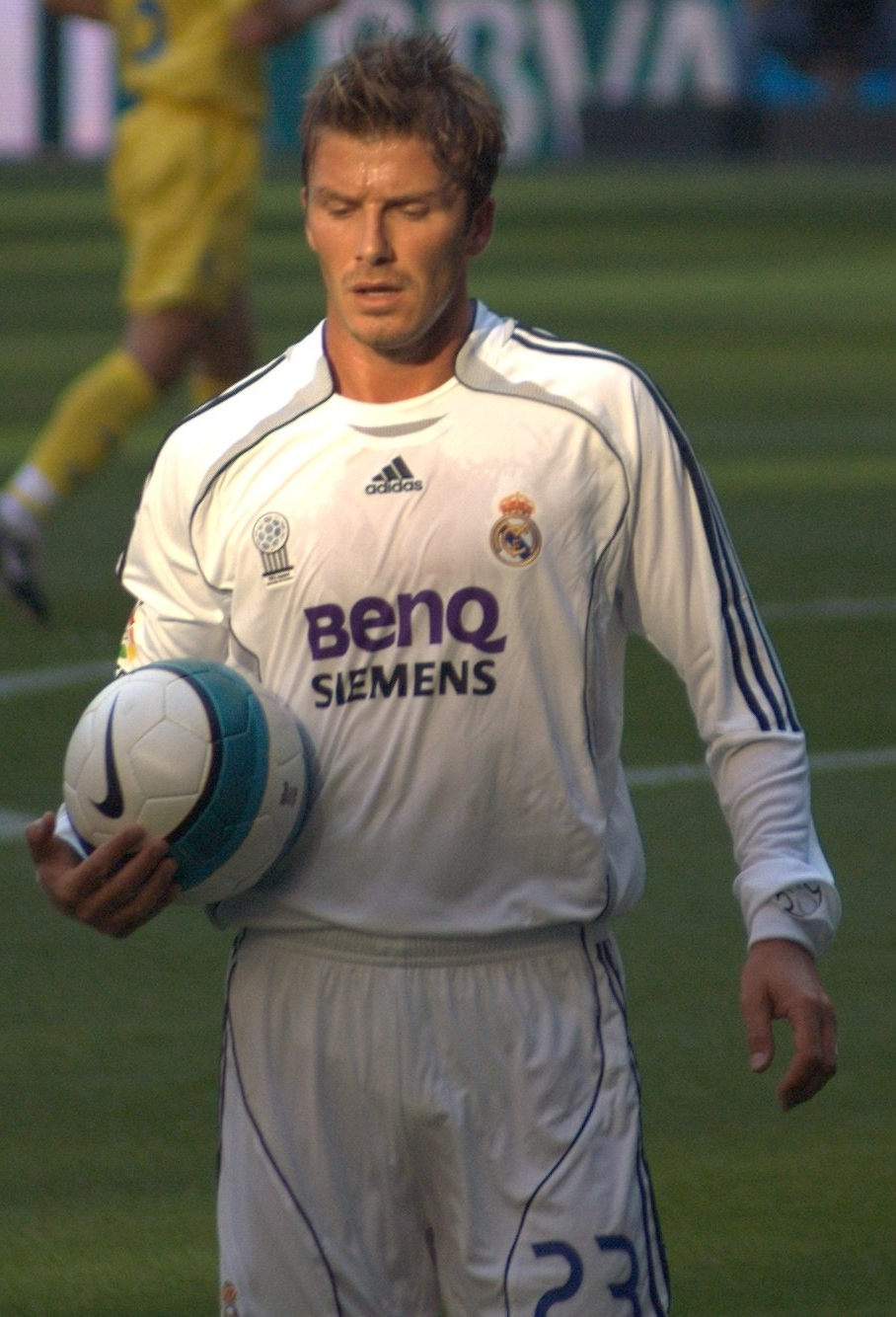
David Beckham playing for Real Madrid in 2007

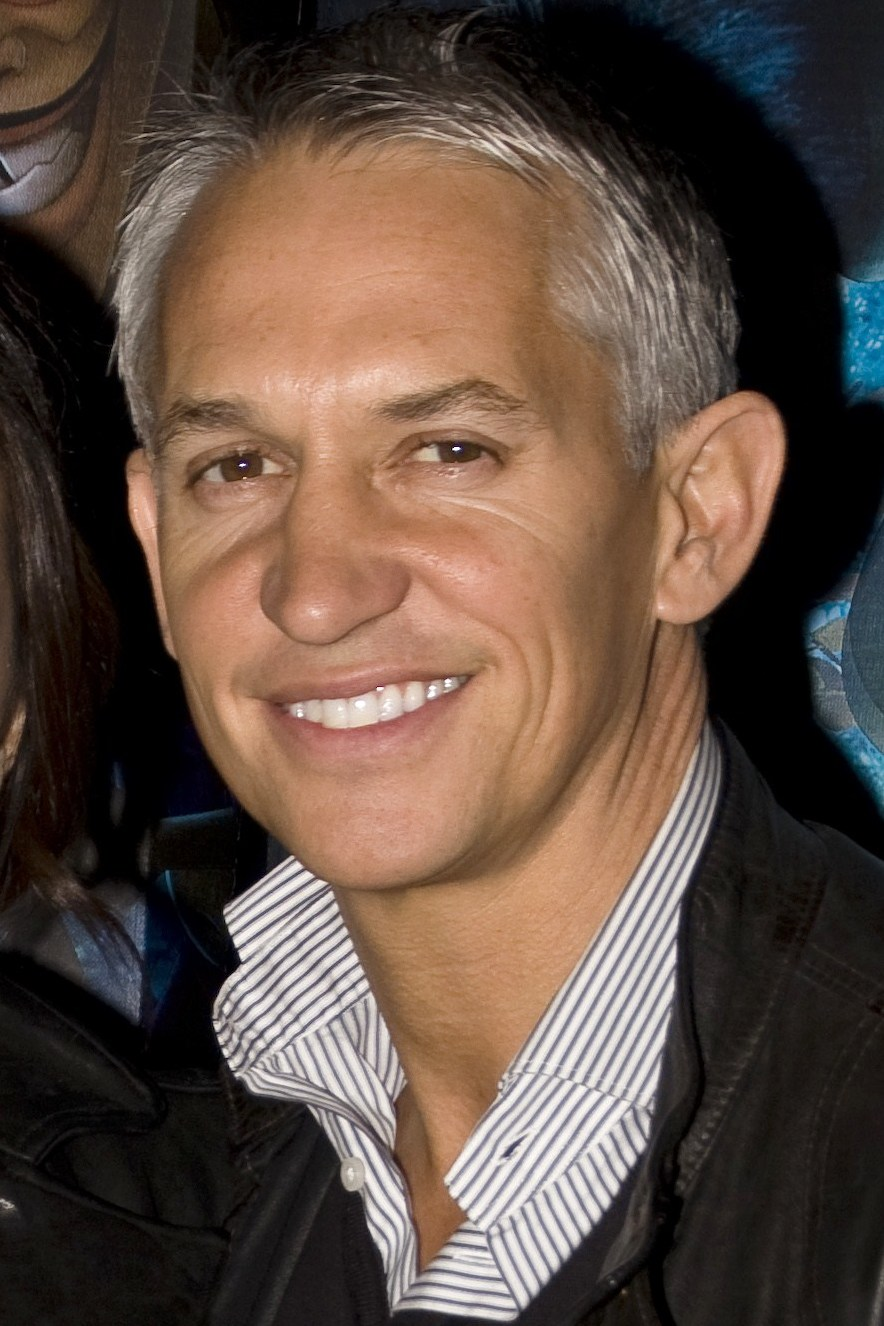
Gary Lineker in 2011

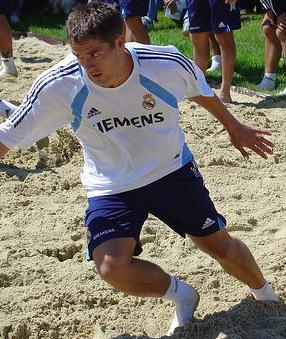
Michael Owen training with Real Madrid in 2005

- Max Aarons – Valencia – 2024–25
- **Trent Alexander-Arnold** – **Real Madrid** – 2025–
- Dalian Atkinson – Real Sociedad – 1990–91
- Peter Barnes – Betis – 1982–83
- David Beckham – Real Madrid – 2003–07
- **Jude Bellingham** – **Real Madrid** – 2023–
- Stan Collymore – Oviedo – 2000–01
- Laurie Cunningham – Real Madrid, Sporting – 1979–82, 83–84
- **Tyrhys Dolan** – **Espanyol** – 2025–
- Mark Draper – Rayo – 1999–00
- Ovie Ejaria – Oviedo – 2025–26
- **Harvey Elliott** – **Valencia** – 2026–
- Conor Gallagher – Atlético Madrid – 2024–26
- **Anthony Gordon** – **Barcelona** – 2026–
- Mason Greenwood – Getafe – 2023–24
- Adrian Heath – Espanyol – 1988–89
- **Abu Kamara** – **Getafe** – 2025–
- Charlie I'Anson – Elche – 2013–14
- Sammy Lee – Osasuna – 1987–89
- Gary Lineker – Barcelona – 1986–89
- Harry Lowe – Real Sociedad – 1934–35
- Steve McManaman – Real Madrid – 1999–03
- Raphael Meade – Betis – 1987–88
- Michael Owen – Real Madrid – 2004–05
- Jermaine Pennant – Zaragoza – 2009–10
- Marcus Rashford – Barcelona – 2025–26
- Kevin Richardson – Real Sociedad – 1990–91
- Patrick Roberts – Girona – 2018–19
- Vinny Samways – Las Palmas, Sevilla – 2000–03
- Kieran Trippier – Atlético Madrid – 2019–22
- Jonathan Woodgate – Real Madrid – 2004–06

=== Estonia ===
- Karl Hein – Valladolid – 2024–25

=== Finland ===
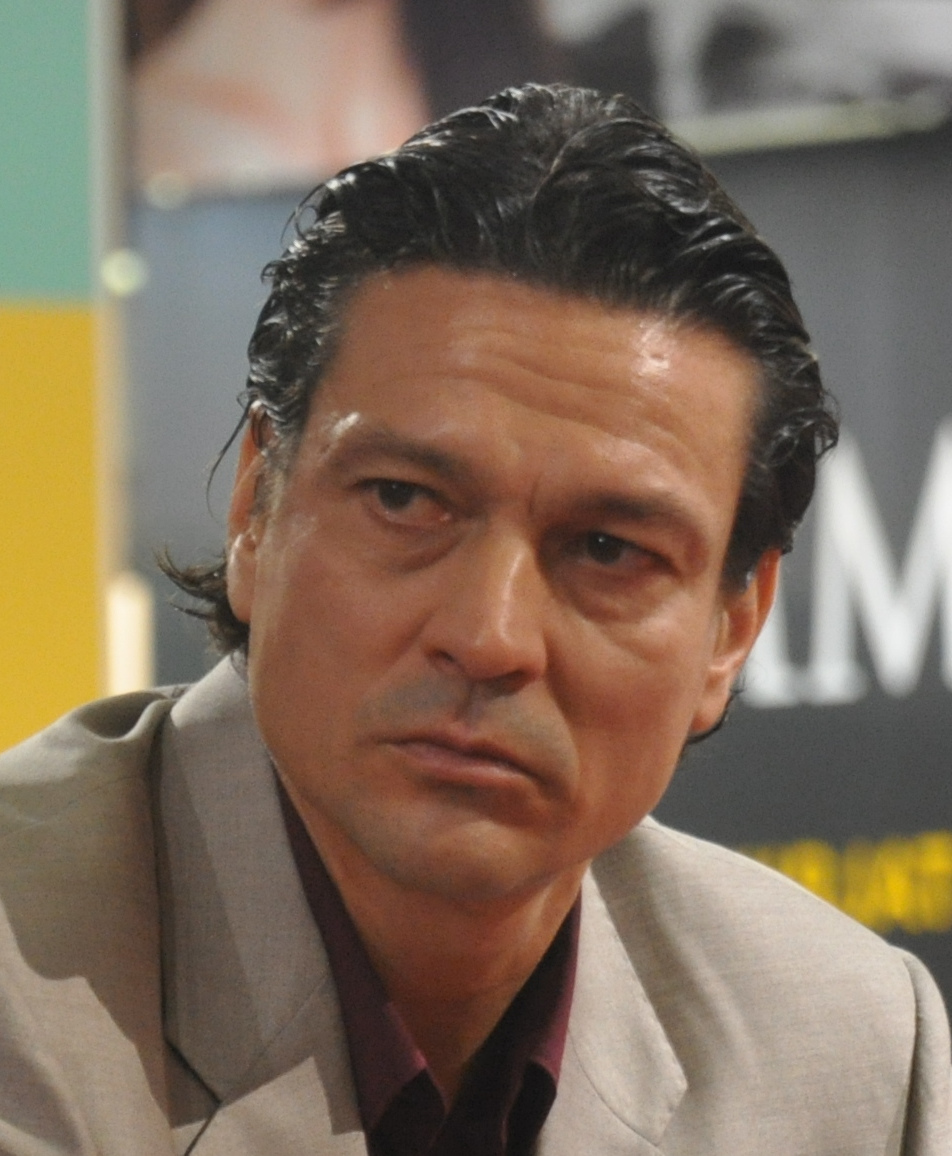
Jari Litmanen in 2015

- Lucas Bergström – Mallorca – 2025–26
- **Ville Koski** – **Alavés** – 2025–
- Jari Litmanen – Barcelona – 1999–00
- Teemu Pukki – Sevilla – 2008–09
- Jukka Raitala – Osasuna – 2011–12

=== France ===
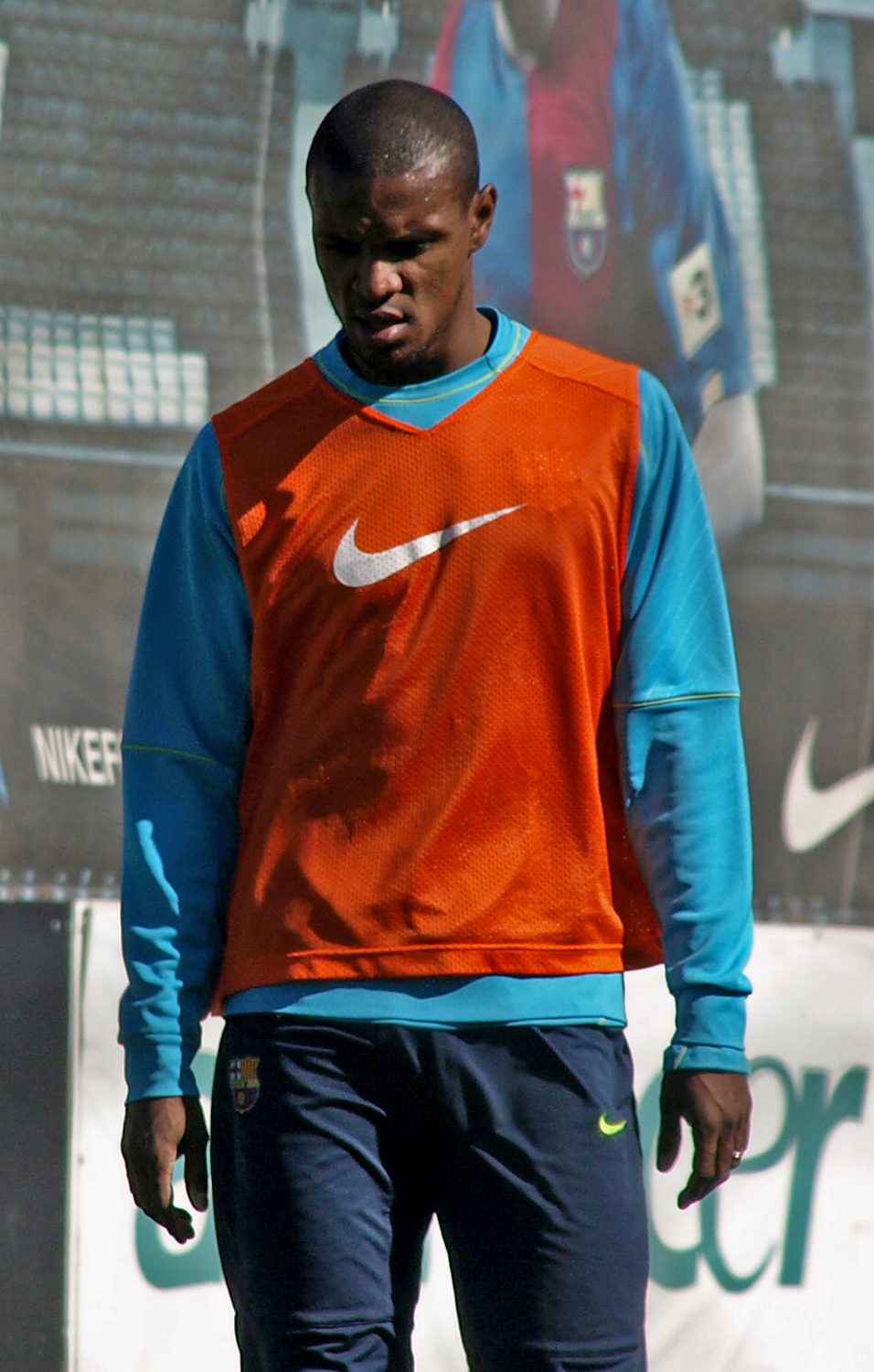
Eric Abidal training with Barcelona in 2008

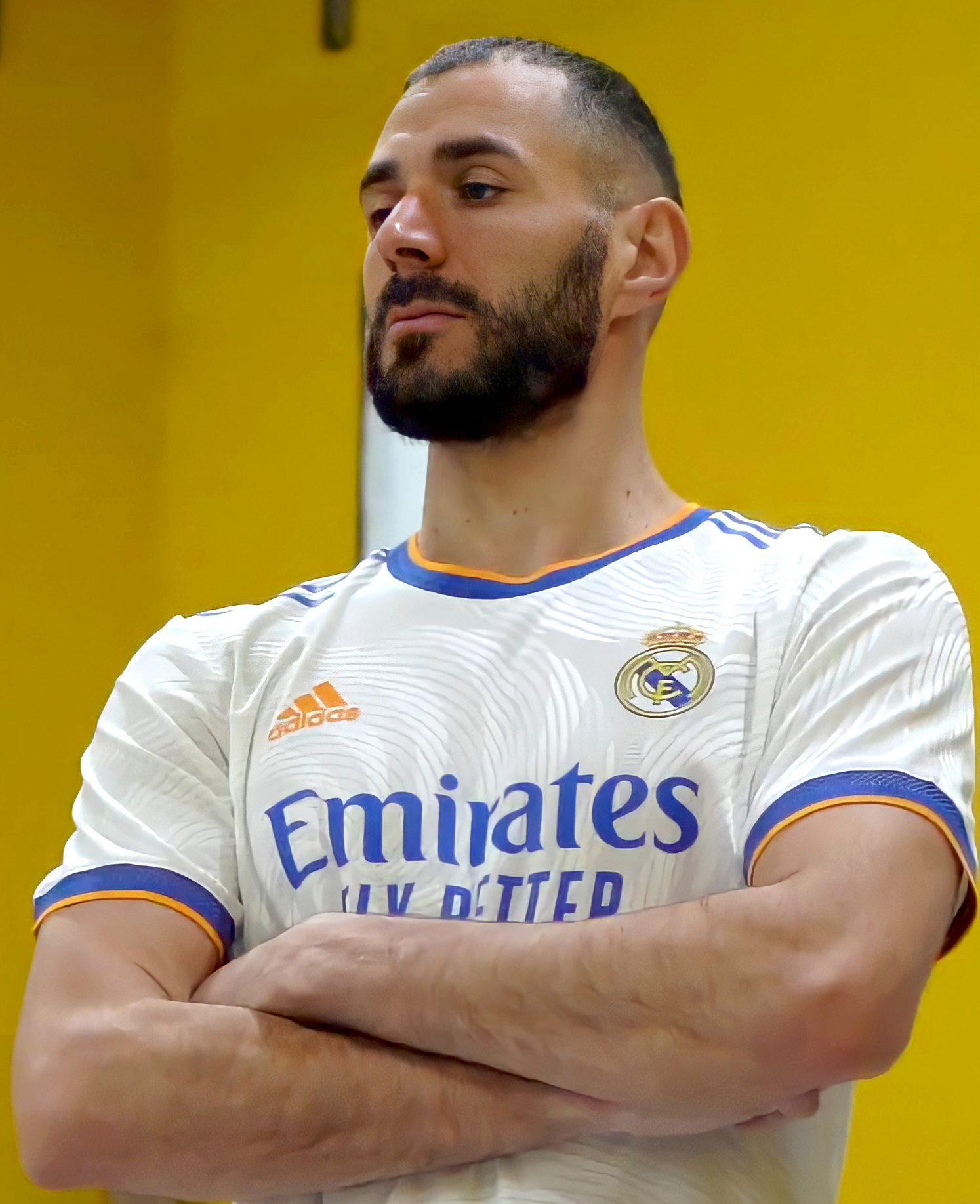
Karim Benzema with Real Madrid in 2021

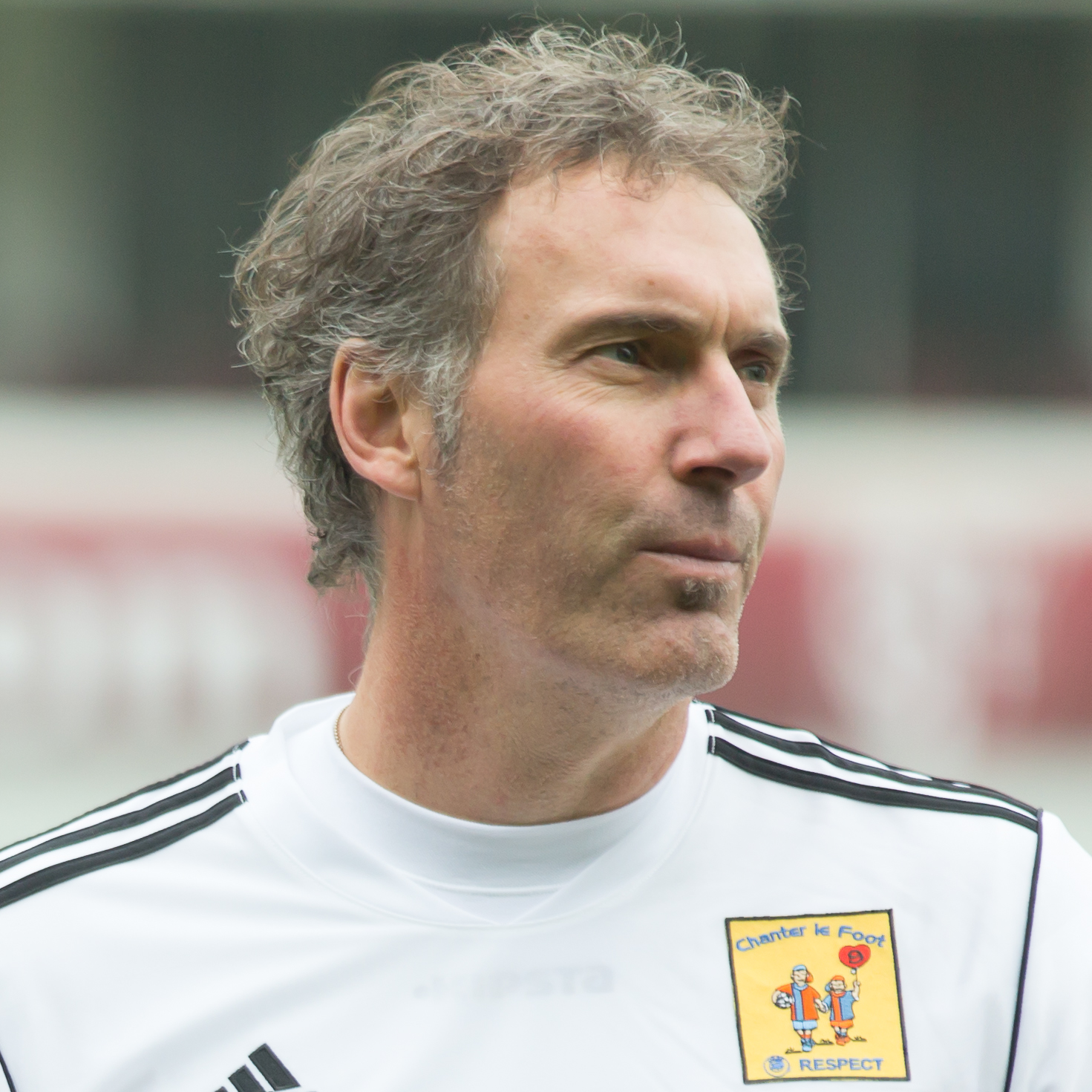
Laurent Blanc in 2013

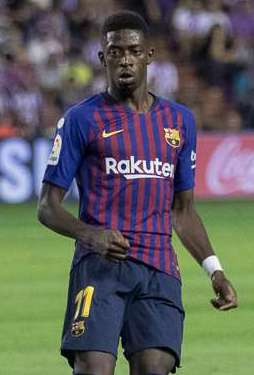
Ousmane Dembélé playing for Barcelona in 2018

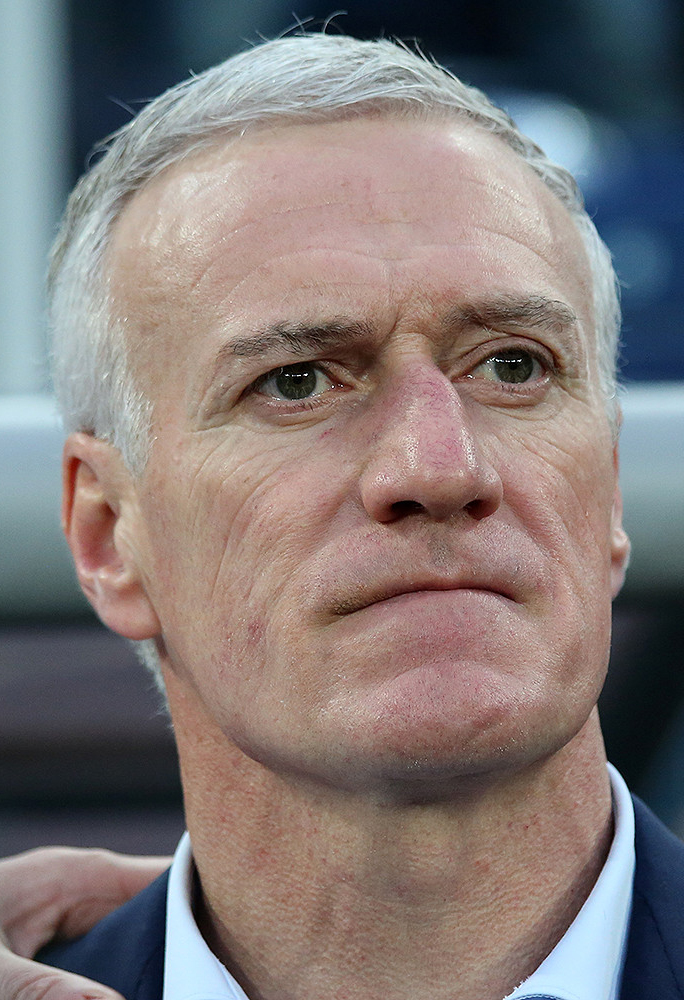
Didier Deschamps in 2018

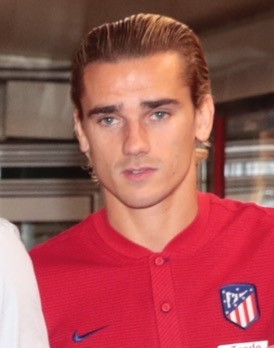
Antoine Griezmann with Atlético Madrid in 2017

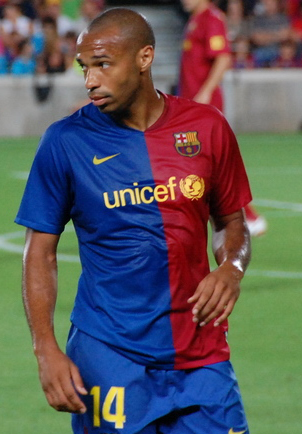
Thierry Henry in action for Barcelona in 2008

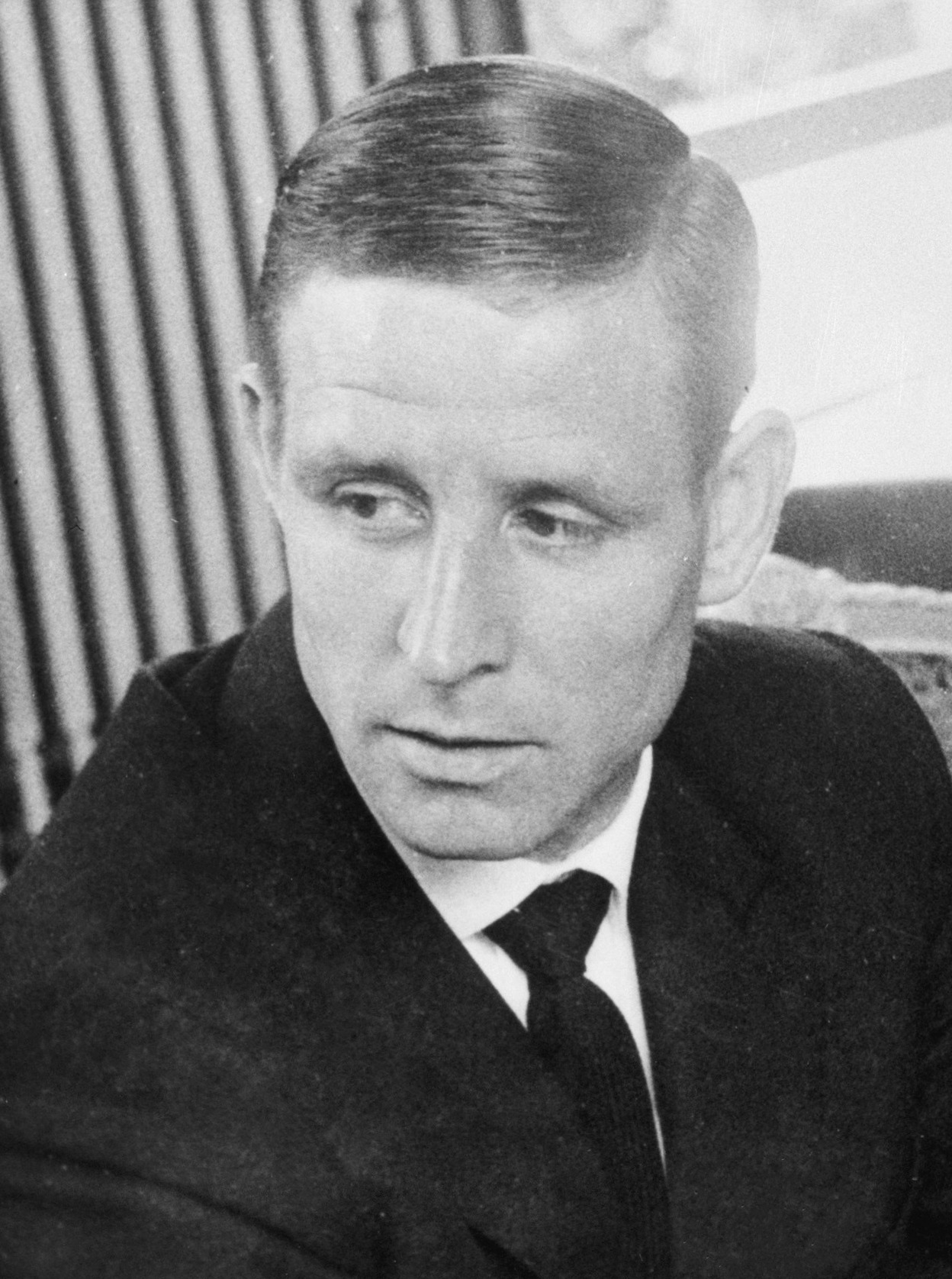
Raymond Kopa in 1963

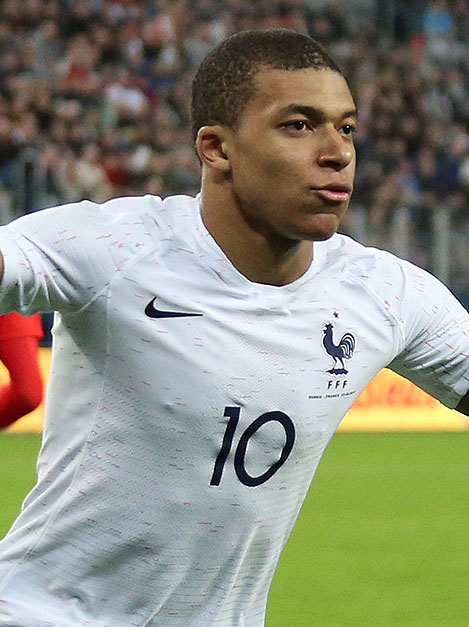
Kylian Mbappé playing for France in 2018

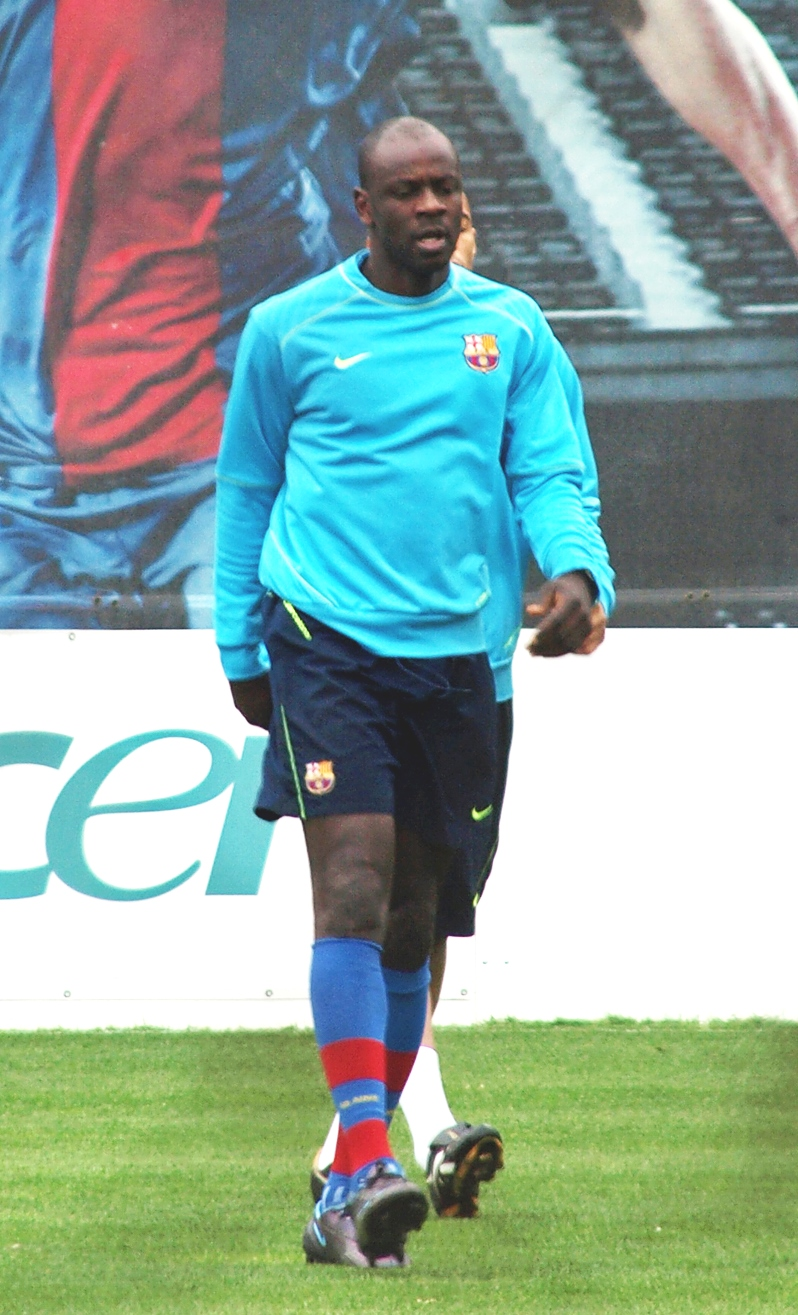
Lilian Thuram training with Barcelona in 2008

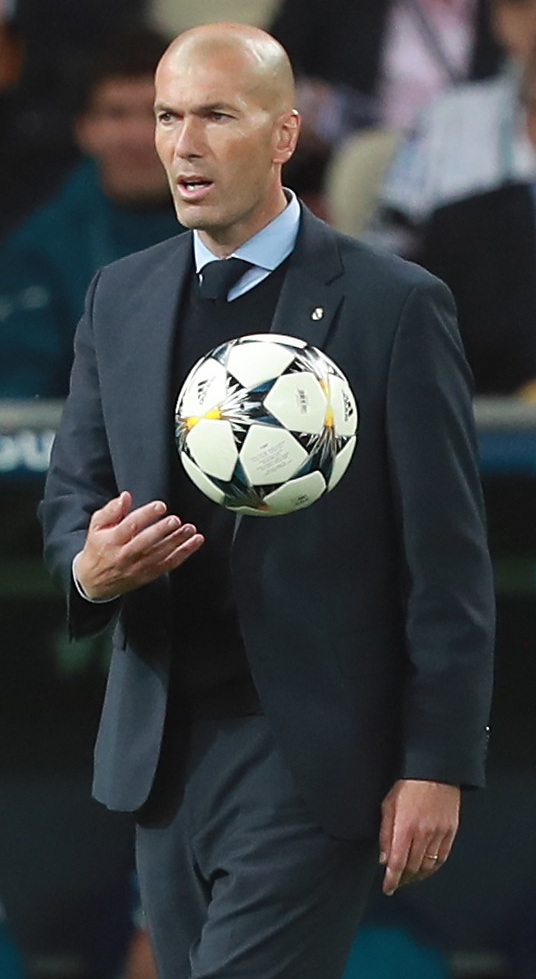
Zinedine Zidane as Real Madrid manager in 2018

- Eric Abidal – Barcelona – 2007–13
- **Lucien Agoumé** – **Sevilla** – 2023–
- Ibrahim Amadou – Sevilla, Leganés – 2018–19, 19–20
- Jordan Amavi – Getafe – 2022–23
- Nicolas Anelka – Real Madrid – 1999–00
- Alphonse Areola – Villarreal, Real Madrid – 2015–16, 19–20
- Loïc Badé – Sevilla – 2022–25
- **Enzo Bardeli** – **Levante** – 2026–
- Thierno Barry – Villarreal – 2024–25
- Paul Baysse – Málaga – 2017–18
- **Jeanuël Belocian** – **Racing** – 2026–
- Hatem Ben Arfa – Valladolid – 2019–20
- Wissam Ben Yedder – Sevilla – 2016–19
- Karim Benzema – Real Madrid – 2009–23
- Grégory Béranger – Espanyol – 2008–09
- Mathieu Berson – Levante – 2006–08
- Laurent Blanc – Barcelona – 1996–97
- Yann Bodiger – Cádiz – 2020–21
- Alain Boghossian – Espanyol – 2002–03
- Jérôme Bonnissel – Deportivo – 1996–99
- Jérémie Bréchet – Real Sociedad – 2004–06
- Ludovic Butelle – Valencia, Valladolid – 2005–08
- **Eduardo Camavinga** – **Real Madrid** – 2021–
- Étienne Capoue – Villarreal – 2020–24
- Lionel Carole – Sevilla – 2017–18
- Sébastien Chabaud – Gimnàstic – 2006–07
- Mohamed-Ali Cho – Real Sociedad – 2022–24
- Philippe Christanval – Barcelona – 2001–03
- Michaël Ciani – Espanyol – 2015–16
- Aly Cissokho – Valencia – 2012–13
- José Cobos – Espanyol – 1996–98
- Alexandre Coeff – Granada – 2013–14
- Francis Coquelin – Valencia, Villarreal – 2017–24
- Sébastien Corchia – Sevilla, Espanyol – 2017–18, 19–20
- Grégory Coupet – Atlético Madrid – 2008–09
- Laurent Courtois – Levante – 2006–08
- Pascal Cygan – Villarreal – 2006–09
- Mouhamadou Dabo – Sevilla – 2010–11
- Stéphane Dalmat – Racing – 2005–06
- Wilfried Dalmat – Racing – 2005–06
- Frédéric Danjou – Oviedo – 1999–01
- Georges Dard – Sevilla – 1948–49
- Frédéric Déhu – Barcelona, Levante – 1999–00, 06–07
- **Romain Del Castillo** – **Osasuna** – 2026–
- Ludovic Delporte – Albacete, Osasuna – 2003–10
- Moussa Dembélé – Atlético Madrid – 2020–21
- Ousmane Dembélé – Barcelona – 2017–23
- Didier Deschamps – Valencia – 2000–01
- Modibo Diakité – Deportivo – 2014–15
- Lassana Diarra – Real Madrid – 2008–13
- Didier Digard – Betis, Osasuna – 2015–17
- Lucas Digne – Barcelona – 2016–18
- Näis Djouahra – Real Sociedad – 2019–20
- Didier Domi – Espanyol – 2004–06
- Marcel Domingo – Atlético Madrid, Espanyol – 1948–51, 52–56
- Jean-Félix Dorothée – Valencia – 2002–03
- Abdoulaye Doucouré – Granada – 2015–16
- Carlos Ducasse – Real Sociedad, Valladolid – 1952–57
- Christophe Dugarry – Barcelona – 1997–98
- Henry Dumat – Castellón – 1973–74
- Richard Dutruel – Celta, Barcelona, Alavés – 1996–03
- Daniel Dutuel – Celta, Valladolid – 1996–99
- Julien Escudé – Sevilla – 2005–12
- Nabil Fekir – Betis – 2019–25
- Mathieu Flamini – Getafe – 2017–19
- **Youssouf Fofana** – **Sevilla** – 2026–
- Kevin Gameiro – Sevilla, Atlético Madrid, Valencia – 2013–21
- Ludovic Giuly – Barcelona – 2004–07
- Joris Gnagnon – Sevilla – 2018–19
- Maxime Gonalons – Sevilla, Granada – 2018–22
- Clément Grenier – Mallorca – 2021–23
- Antoine Griezmann – Real Sociedad, Atlético Madrid, Barcelona – 2010–26
- Josuha Guilavogui – Atlético Madrid – 2013–14
- Thierry Henry – Barcelona – 2007–10
- Jean-François Hernandez – Compostela, Rayo – 1997–98, 99–00, 01–02
- Lucas Hernandez – Atlético Madrid – 2014–19
- Théo Hernandez – Alavés, Real Madrid, Real Sociedad – 2016–19
- Louis Hon – Real Madrid – 1950–53
- Gaëtan Huard – Hércules – 1996–97
- Justin Kalumba – Mallorca – 2025–26
- Olivier Kapo – Levante – 2006–07
- Christian Karembeu – Real Madrid – 1997–00
- Koba Koindredi – Valencia – 2020–22
- Timothée Kolodziejczak – Sevilla – 2014–17
- **Ibrahima Konaté** – **Real Madrid** – 2026–
- Abdoulay Konko – Sevilla – 2008–11
- Raymond Kopa – Real Madrid – 1956–59
- **Jules Koundé** – Sevilla, **Barcelona** – 2019–
- **Aymeric Laporte** – **Athletic Bilbao** – 2012–18, 25–
- Bertrand Laquait – Recreativo – 2006–07
- Benjamin Lecomte – Espanyol – 2022–23
- **Florian Lejeune** – Villarreal, Eibar, Alavés, **Rayo** – 2011–12, 16–17, 20–
- **Thomas Lemar** – Atlético Madrid, Girona, **Elche** – 2018–
- Clément Lenglet – Sevilla, Barcelona, Atlético Madrid – 2016–22, 24–26
- Bixente Lizarazu – Athletic Bilbao – 1996–97
- Enzo Loiodice – Las Palmas – 2023–25
- Jordan Lotiès – Osasuna – 2013–14
- **Johaneko Louis-Jean** – **Athletic Bilbao** – 2026–
- Peter Luccin – Celta, Atlético Madrid, Zaragoza, Racing – 2001–10
- Jean Luciano – Real Madrid, Las Palmas – 1950–52
- Péguy Luyindula – Levante – 2006–07
- Mickaël Madar – Deportivo – 1996–98
- Claude Makélélé – Celta, Real Madrid – 1998–03
- Eliaquim Mangala – Valencia – 2016–17, 19–21
- Faitout Maouassa – Granada – 2023–24
- Anthony Martial – Sevilla – 2021–22
- Jonas Martin – Betis – 2016–17
- Corentin Martins – Deportivo – 1996–98
- Jérémy Mathieu – Valencia, Barcelona – 2009–17
- Neal Maupay – Sevilla – 2025–26
- Florian Maurice – Celta – 2001–02
- Rio Mavuba – Villarreal – 2007–08
- **Kylian Mbappé** – **Real Madrid** – 2024–
- Batista Mendy – Sevilla – 2025–26
- **Ferland Mendy** – **Real Madrid** – 2019–
- Yohan Mollo – Granada – 2011–12
- Lucien Muller – Real Madrid, Barcelona – 1962–68
- Samir Nasri – Sevilla – 2016–17
- Tanguy Nianzou – Sevilla – 2022–26
- Steven Nzonzi – Sevilla – 2015–18
- Nicolas Ouédec – Espanyol – 1996–98
- Noé Pamarot – Hércules, Granada – 2010–12
- Fabrice Pancrate – Betis – 2006–07
- Franck Passi – Compostela – 1994–98
- Jérémy Perbet – Villarreal – 2013–14
- Michael Pereira – Mallorca, Granada – 2010–13, 13–14
- Romain Perraud – Betis – 2024–25
- Emmanuel Petit – Barcelona – 2000–01
- René Petit – Real Unión – 1928–32
- Léo Pétrot – Elche – 2025–26
- Ronaël Pierre-Gabriel – Espanyol – 2022–23
- Stéphane Pignol – Compostela, Numancia, Murcia – 1997–98, 04–05, 07–08
- Robert Pires – Villarreal – 2006–10
- Lionel Potillon – Real Sociedad – 2003–04
- Ugo Raghouber – Levante – 2025–26
- Adil Rami – Valencia, Sevilla – 2011–14, 15–17
- René Raphy – Murcia – 1950–51
- Loïc Rémy – Las Palmas, Getafe – 2017–18
- Anthony Réveillère – Valencia – 2002–03
- Laurent Robert – Levante – 2006–07
- Alain Roche – Valencia – 1998–00
- Bruno Rodriguez – Rayo – 2001–02
- **Valentin Rosier** – Leganés, **Osasuna** – 2024–
- Eric Roy – Rayo – 2001–02
- Modibo Sagnan – Real Sociedad – 2020–21
- Yannis Salibur – Mallorca – 2019–20
- Baptiste Santamaria – Valencia – 2025–26
- Matthieu Saunier – Granada – 2016–17
- Franck Signorino – Getafe – 2007–10
- Florent Sinama Pongolle – Recreativo, Atlético Madrid, Zaragoza – 2006–10, 10–11
- Boubakary Soumaré – Sevilla – 2023–24
- Sébastien Squillaci – Sevilla – 2008–10
- Ludovic Sylvestre – Barcelona – 2005–06
- Franck Tabanou – Granada – 2016–17
- **Axel Tape** – **Levante** – 2026–
- **Aurélien Tchouaméni** – **Real Madrid** – 2022–
- Lilian Thuram – Barcelona – 2006–08
- Jean-Clair Todibo – Barcelona – 2018–20
- Jérémy Toulalan – Málaga – 2011–13
- Benoît Trémoulinas – Sevilla – 2014–17
- David Trezeguet – Hércules – 2010–11
- Samuel Umtiti – Barcelona – 2016–22
- Raphaël Varane – Real Madrid – 2011–21
- Laurent Viaud – Extremadura, Albacete – 1998–99, 03–05
- Grégory Vignal – Espanyol – 2003–04
- Karim Yoda – Getafe – 2014–16
- Stéphane Ziani – Deportivo – 1998–99
- Enzo Zidane – Alavés – 2017–18
- Zinedine Zidane – Real Madrid – 2001–06

=== Georgia (Georgia (country)) ===
- Shota Arveladze – Levante – 2007–08
- Giorgi Demetradze – Real Sociedad – 2000–02
- **Giorgi Guliashvili** – **Racing** – 2026–
- **Giorgi Kochorashvili** – Levante, **Sevilla** – 2019–21, 26–
- Giorgi Mamardashvili – Valencia – 2021–25
- **Georges Mikautadze** – **Villarreal** – 2025–
- **Saba Sazonov** – **Getafe** – 2026–
- **Giorgi Tsitaishvili** – **Rayo** – 2026–

=== Germany ===
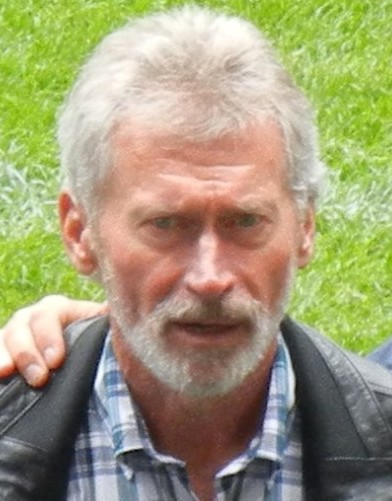
Paul Breitner in 2011

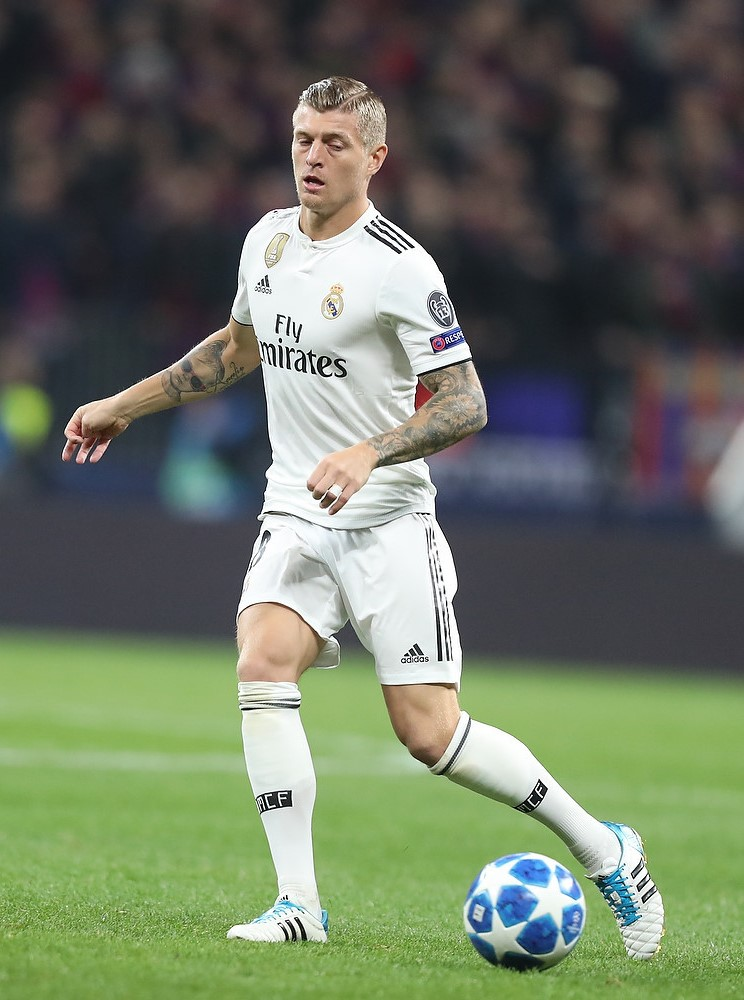
Toni Kroos playing for Real Madrid in 2018

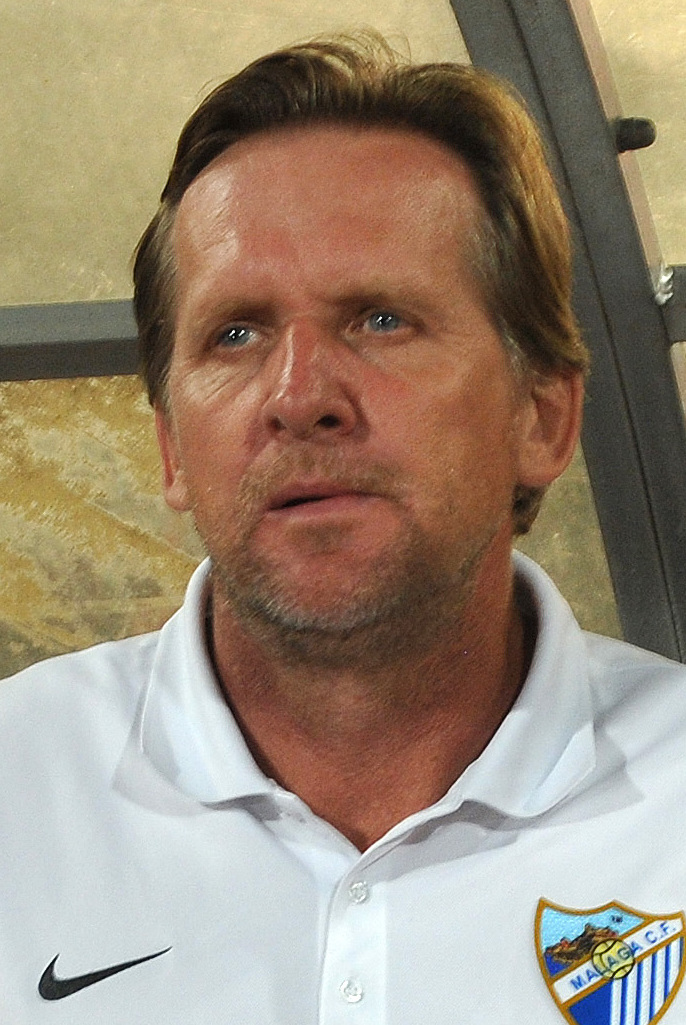
Bernd Schuster as Málaga manager in 2013

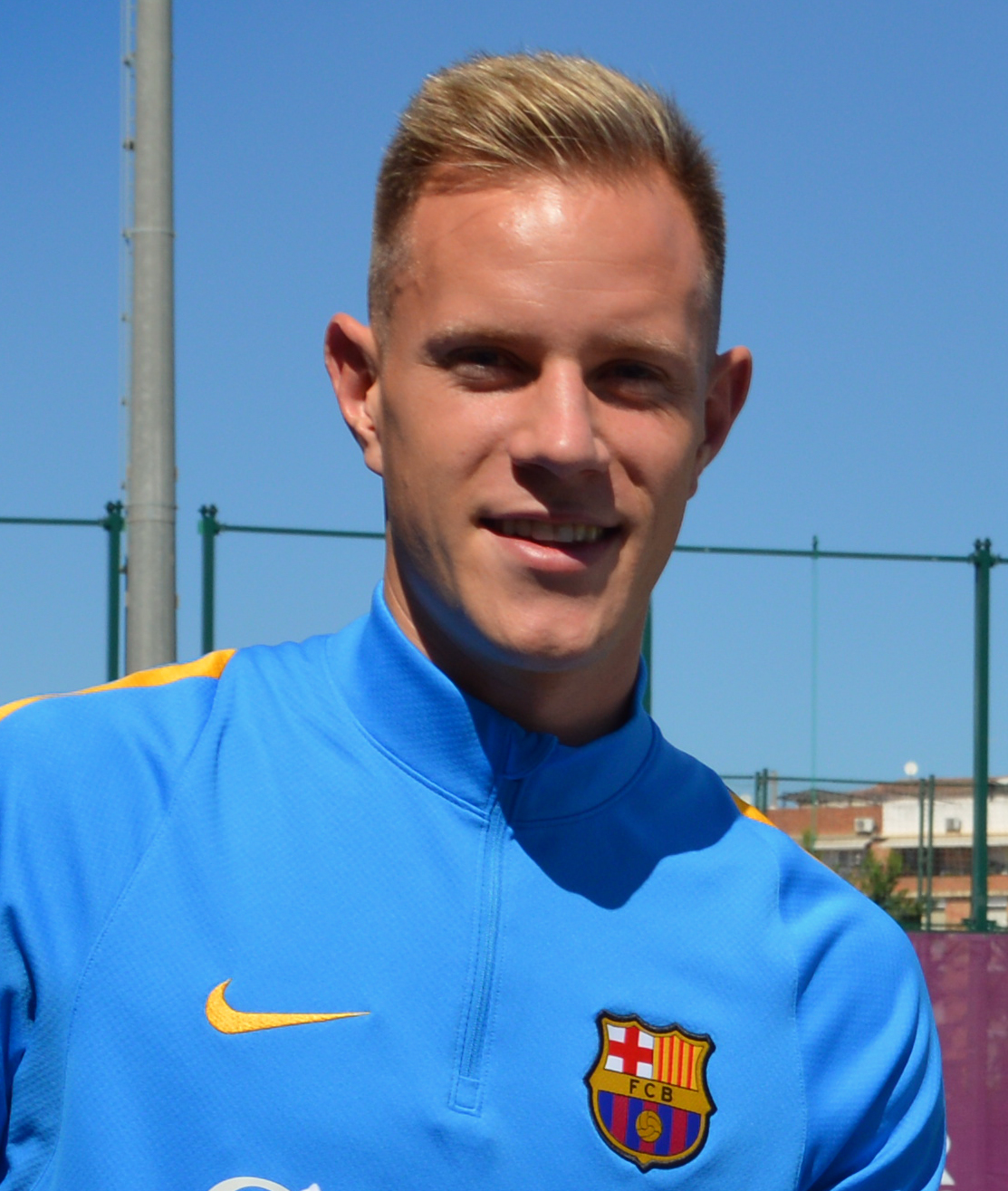
Marc-André ter Stegen with Barcelona in 2015

- **Karim Adeyemi** – **Barcelona** – 2026–
- Wolfgang April – Sabadell – 1986–87
- Rainer Bonhof – Valencia – 1978–80
- Andreas Brehme – Zaragoza – 1992–93
- Paul Breitner – Real Madrid – 1974–77
- Patrick Ebert – Valladolid, Rayo – 2012–14, 15–16
- Josef Elting – Murcia – 1974–75
- Robert Enke – Barcelona – 2002–03
- Johannes Geis – Sevilla – 2017–18
- İlkay Gündoğan – Barcelona – 2023–24
- Timo Hildebrand – Valencia – 2007–08
- Franz Hiller – Elche – 1973–74
- Andreas Hinkel – Sevilla – 2006–08
- Bodo Illgner – Real Madrid – 1996–00
- Sami Khedira – Real Madrid – 2010–15
- Jochen Kientz – Logroñés – 1996–97
- Toni Kroos – Real Madrid – 2014–24
- Christian Lell – Levante – 2012–14
- Peter Lübeke – Hércules – 1976–77
- Marko Marin – Sevilla – 2013–14
- Christoph Metzelder – Real Madrid – 2007–10
- Shkodran Mustafi – Valencia, Levante – 2014–17, 21–22
- Günter Netzer – Real Madrid – 1973–76
- Oliver Neuville – Tenerife – 1996–97
- David Odonkor – Betis – 2006–09
- Mesut Özil – Real Madrid – 2010–14
- Gerhard Poschner – Rayo – 1999–01
- **Clemens Riedel** – **Espanyol** – 2025–
- **Antonio Rüdiger** – **Real Madrid** – 2022–
- Bernhard "Bernd" Schuster – Barcelona, Real Madrid, Atlético Madrid – 1980–93
- Ulrich "Uli" Stielike – Real Madrid – 1977–85
- Marc-André ter Stegen – Barcelona, Girona – 2014–26
- **Jeremy Toljan** – **Levante** – 2025–
- Piotr Trochowski – Sevilla – 2011–14
- Miroslav "Mirko" Votava – Atlético Madrid – 1982–85
- Emil "Emilio" Walter – Barcelona – 1928–31
- Heiko Westermann – Betis – 2015–16
- Wolfram Wuttke – Espanyol – 1990–92

=== Gibraltar ===
- Manuel Imossi – Valencia – 1931–32

=== Greece ===
- Angelos Basinas – Mallorca – 2005–08
- Lampros Choutos – Mallorca – 2005–06
- Anastasios Douvikas – Celta – 2023–25
- Theofanis Gekas – Levante – 2012–13
- Nikolaos Karabelas – Levante – 2012–16
- Orestis Karnezis – Granada – 2013–14
- Kostas Kiassos – Numancia – 2004–05
- Panagiotis Kone – Granada – 2016–17
- Leonardo Koutris – Mallorca – 2019–20
- Nikos Machlas – Sevilla – 2002–03
- Petros Marinakis – Sevilla – 1996–97
- Themistoklis "Demis" Nikolaidis – Atlético Madrid – 2003–04
- Sokratis Papastathopoulos – Betis – 2023–24
- Giourkas Seitaridis – Atlético Madrid – 2006–09
- Dimitris Siovas – Leganés, Huesca – 2016–21
- Vasilios Tsiartas – Sevilla – 1996–97, 99–00
- Alexandros Tziolis – Racing – 2010–12
- **Odysseas Vlachodimos** – **Sevilla** – 2025–
- Loukas Vyntra – Levante – 2012–15

=== Hungary ===
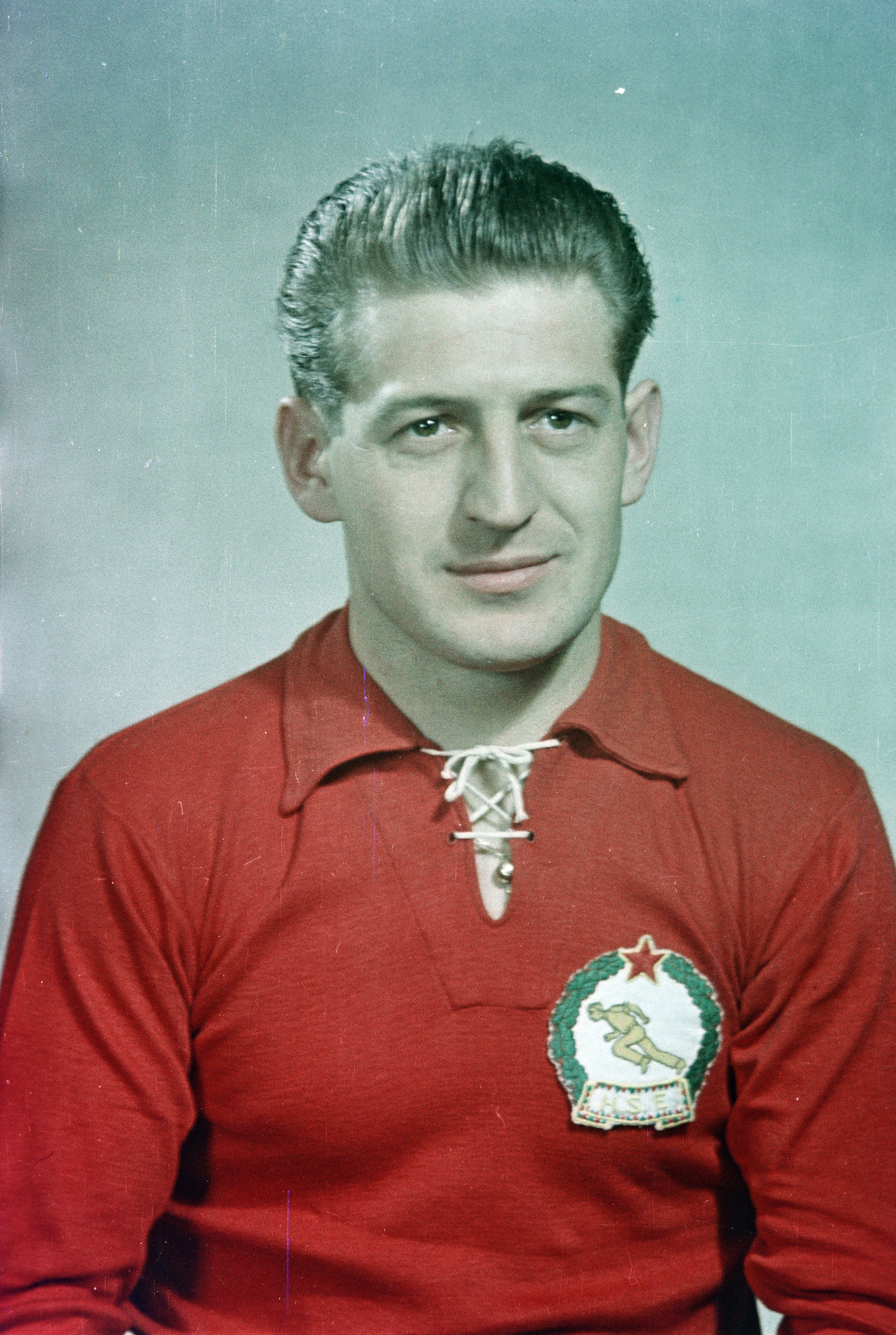
Zoltán Czibor in 1954

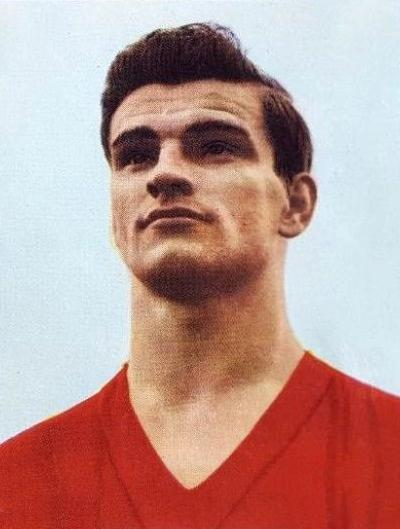
Sándor Kocsis in 1970

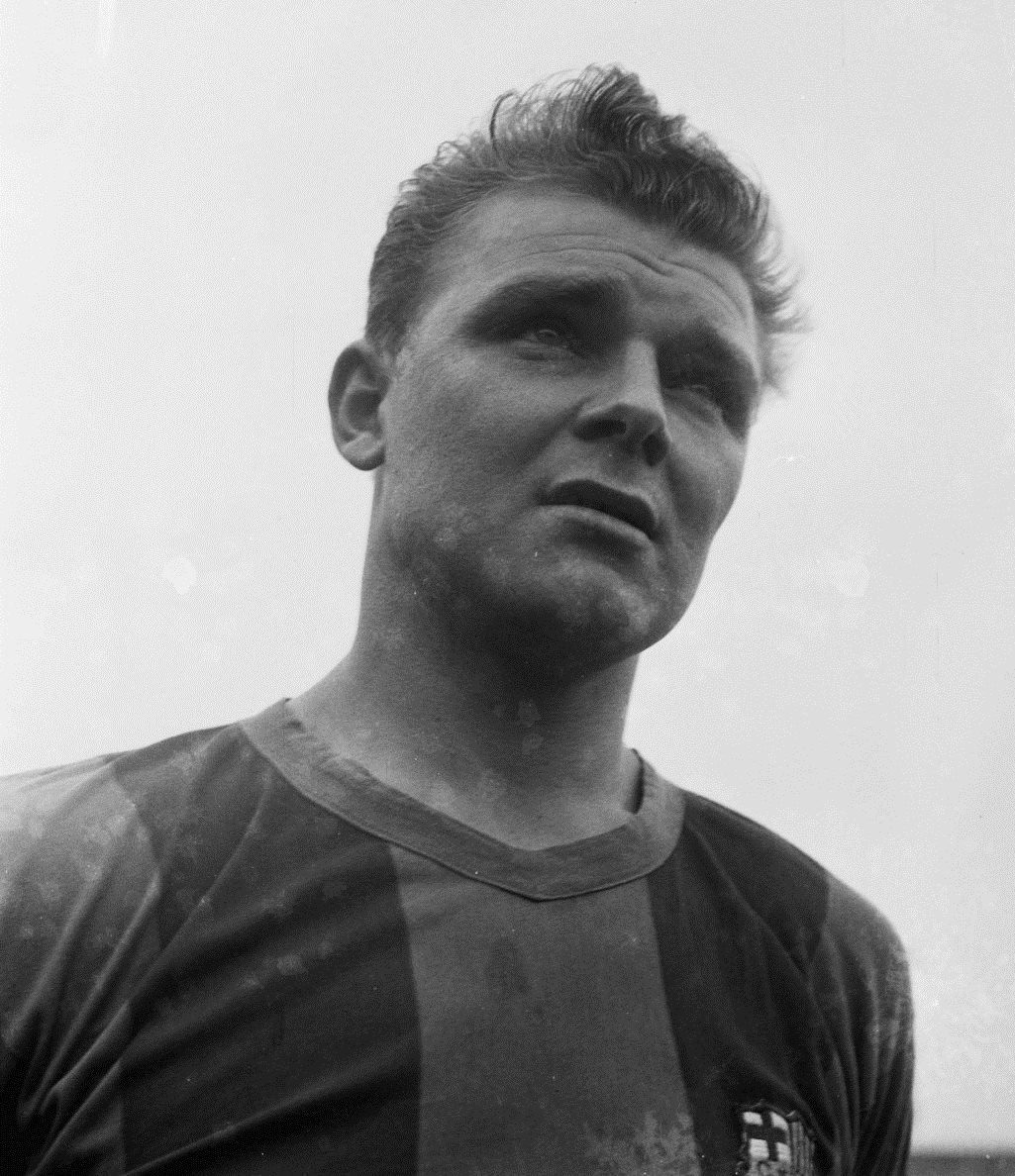
László Kubala with Barcelona in 1953

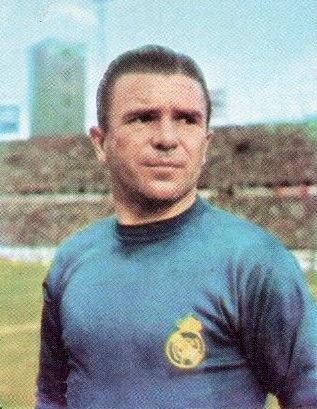
Ferenc Puskás with Real Madrid in 1965

- János Aknai – Valencia – 1934–35
- Gyula Alberty – Real Madrid, Celta, Granada – 1934–36, 39–42
- János Beke – Valladolid – 1959–60
- Elemér Berkessy – Barcelona – 1934–36
- Joseph Csabay – Zaragoza – 1958–60
- Josef Csóka – Atlético Madrid – 1958–59
- Zoltán Czibor – Barcelona, Espanyol – 1958–62
- László Dajka – Las Palmas – 1987–88
- **Péter Gulácsi** – **Villarreal** – 2026–
- János Hrotkó – Zaragoza – 1951–52
- Péter Kampfl – Atlético Madrid – 1957–58
- László Kaszás – Racing, Espanyol – 1960–61, 63–65
- Guillermo Kelemen – Real Madrid – 1935–36
- István Kis Szolnok – Espanyol, Mallorca – 1957–61
- Sándor Kocsis – Barcelona – 1958–65
- László Kubala – Barcelona, Espanyol – 1950–61, 63–64
- János Kuszmann – Betis, Espanyol – 1958–66
- Attila Ladinszky – Betis – 1975–78
- Zsolt Limperger – Real Burgos, Celta – 1991–93, 93–94
- Balázs Molnár – Espanyol – 1999–00
- Sándor Müller – Hércules – 1981–82
- Andrej Prean Nagy – Las Palmas – 1951–52
- György Nemes – Real Madrid – 1950–51
- Tamás Nikitscher – Valladolid – 2024–25
- Ádám Pintér – Zaragoza – 2010–13
- Ferenc Plattkó – Barcelona – 1928–30
- Ferenc Puskás – Real Madrid – 1958–66
- József Samu – Zaragoza – 1952–53
- Béla Sárosi – Zaragoza – 1952–53
- Lajos Schróth – Cádiz – 1989–90
- Gyula Szabó – Granada – 1959–60
- Tibor Szalay – Sevilla, Barcelona, Murcia – 1958–62, 63–64
- József Szendrei – Cádiz – 1988–92
- Krisztián Vadócz – Osasuna – 2008–11
- Antal Yaakobishvili – Girona – 2023–24

=== Iceland ===
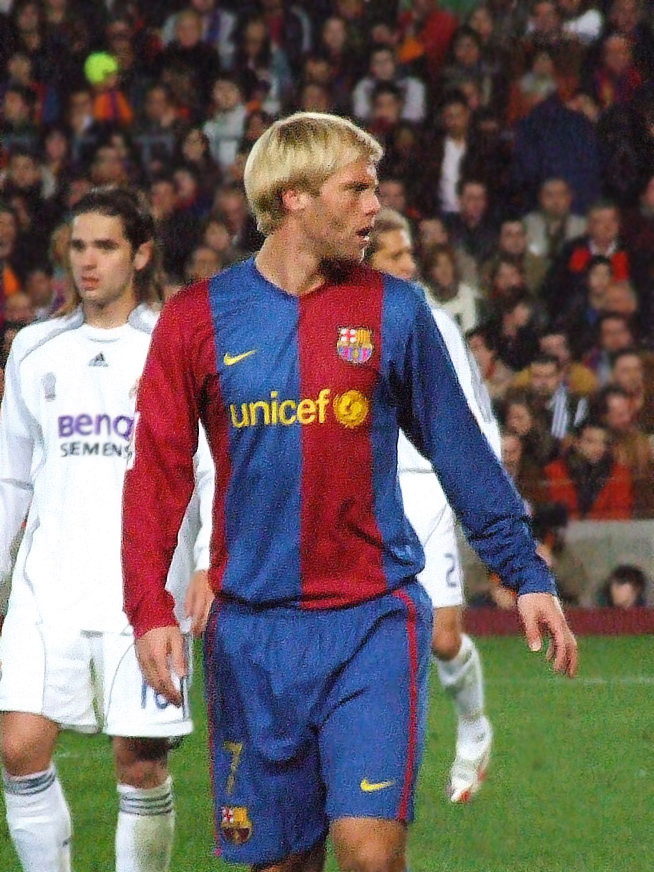
Eiður Guðjohnsen playing for Barcelona in 2007

- Alfreð Finnbogason – Real Sociedad – 2014–15
- Eiður Guðjohnsen – Barcelona – 2006–09
- Joey Guðjónsson – Betis – 2001–03
- Þórður Guðjónsson – Las Palmas – 2000–01
- Sverrir Ingi Ingason – Granada – 2016–17
- **Orri Óskarsson** – **Real Sociedad** – 2024–
- Pétur Pétursson – Hércules – 1985–86

=== Israel ===
- Tai Abed – Levante – 2025–26
- Omri Afek – Racing – 2003–04
- Dudu Aouate – Racing, Deportivo, Mallorca – 2003–13
- Omer Atzili – Granada – 2016–17
- Ilan Bakhar – Racing – 2002–03
- Yossi Benayoun – Racing – 2002–05
- Mu'nas Dabbur – Sevilla – 2019–20
- Ronen Harazi – Salamanca – 1997–98
- Tomer Hemed – Mallorca, Almería – 2011–13, 14–15
- Avi Nimni – Atlético Madrid – 1997–98
- Haim Revivo – Celta – 1996–00
- **Roy Revivo** – **Elche** – 2026–
- Ben Sahar – Espanyol – 2009–10
- Manor Solomon – Villarreal – 2025–26
- Idan Tal – Rayo – 2002–03
- Shon Weissman – Valladolid, Granada – 2020–21, 22–23, 23–24

=== Italy ===
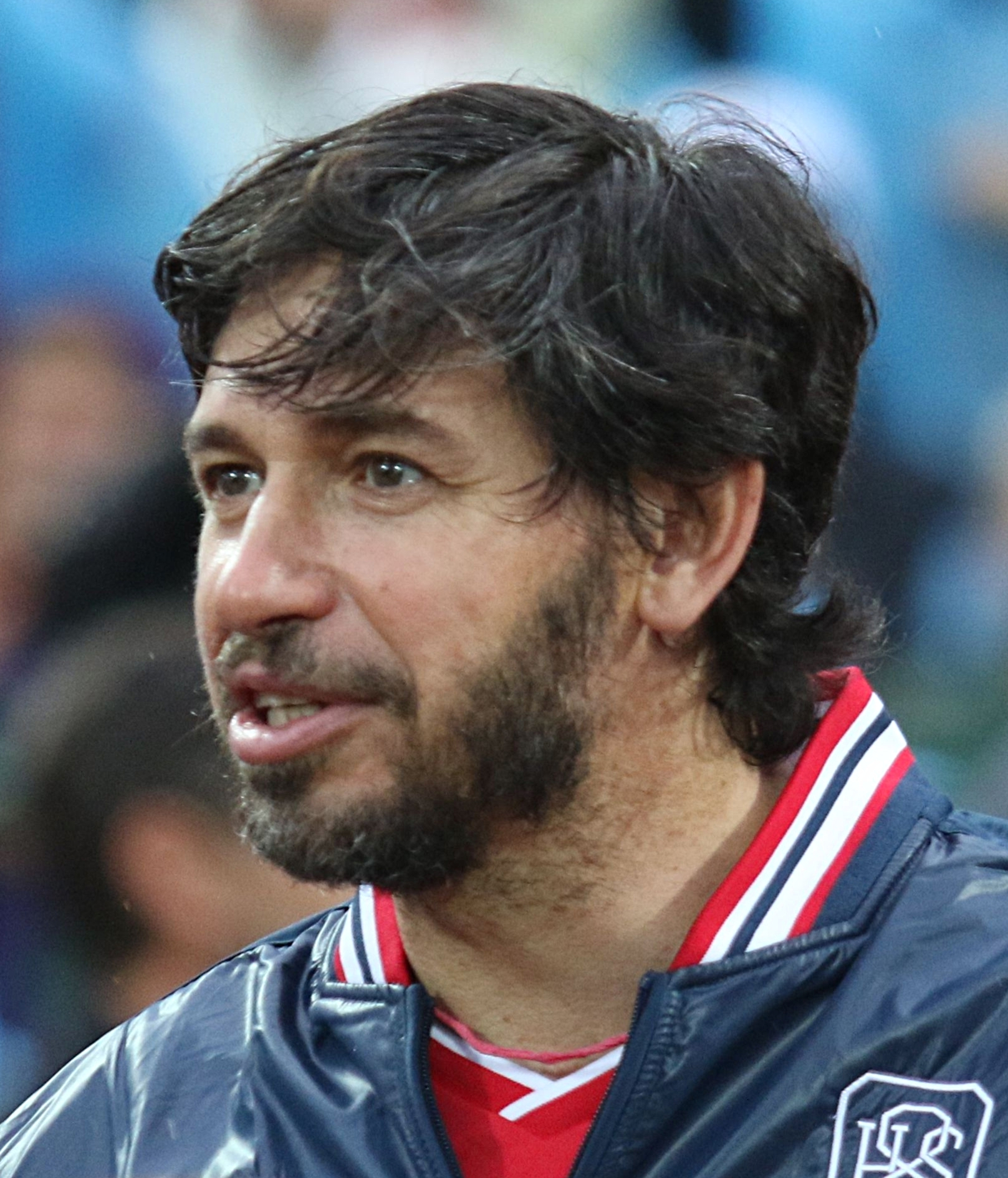
Demetrio Albertini in 2016

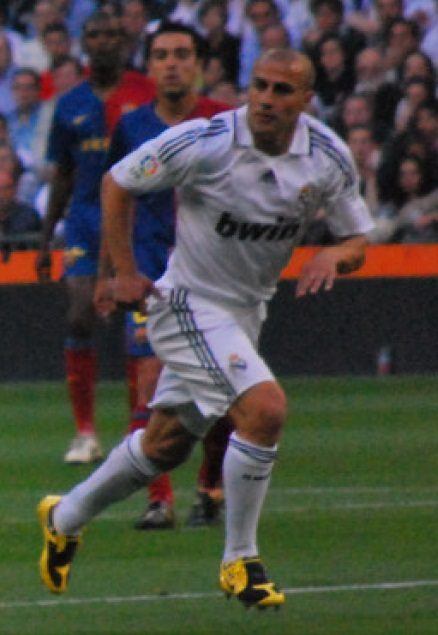
Fabio Cannavaro playing for Real Madrid in 2009

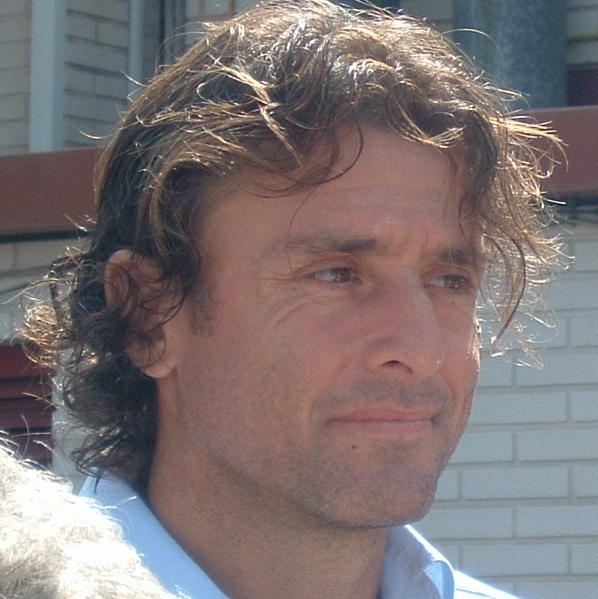
Amedeo Carboni with Valencia in 2005

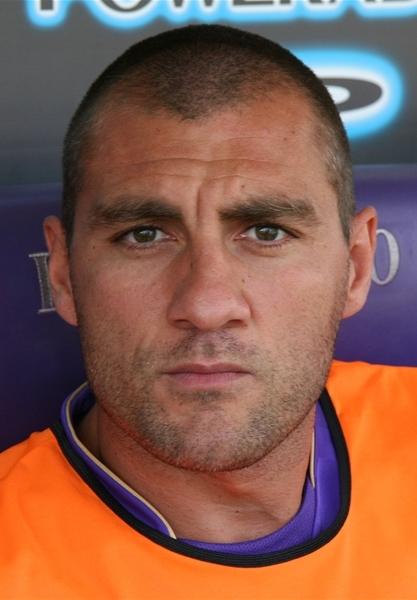
Christian Vieri in 2007

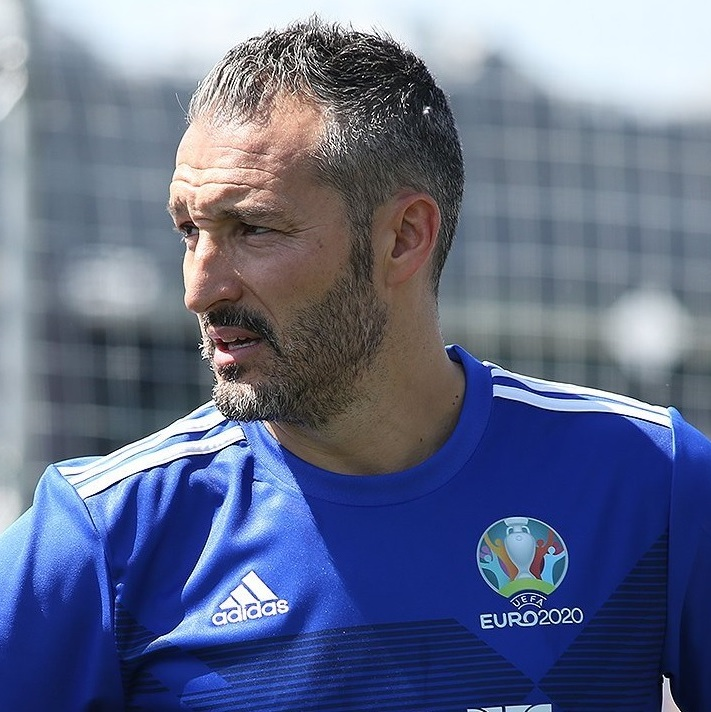
Gianluca Zambrotta in 2019

- Christian Abbiati – Atlético Madrid – 2007–08
- Robert Acquafresca – Levante – 2012–13
- Demetrio Albertini – Atlético Madrid, Barcelona – 2002–03, 04–05
- **Lorenzo Amatucci** – **Deportivo** – 2026–
- Marco Andreolli – Sevilla – 2015–16
- Alberto Aquilani – Las Palmas – 2017–18
- Federico Barba – Valladolid – 2019–20
- Nicola Berti – Alavés – 1998–99
- Cristiano Biraghi – Granada – 2015–16
- Angelo Bollano – Murcia – 1950–51
- Daniele Bonera – Villarreal – 2015–19
- Alberto Brignoli – Leganés – 2016–17
- Aridex Calligaris – Real Sociedad – 1949–50
- Antonio Candela – Valladolid – 2024–25
- Fabio Cannavaro – Real Madrid – 2006–09
- Amedeo Carboni – Valencia – 1997–06
- Antonio Cassano – Real Madrid – 2005–07
- Paolo Castellini – Betis – 2004–06
- Alessio Cerci – Atlético Madrid – 2014–15, 16–17
- Bruno Cirillo – Levante – 2007–08
- Luca Cigarini – Sevilla – 2010–11
- Francesco Coco – Barcelona – 2001–02
- Matteo Contini – Zaragoza – 2009–11
- Bernardo Corradi – Valencia – 2004–05
- Patrick Cutrone – Valencia – 2020–21
- Sergio Del Pinto – Lleida – 1950–51
- Morgan De Sanctis – Sevilla – 2007–08
- Marco Di Vaio – Valencia – 2004–06
- Cristiano Doni – Mallorca – 2005–06
- Stefano Fiore – Valencia – 2004–05
- Alessandro Florenzi – Valencia – 2019–20
- Antonio Floro Flores – Granada – 2012–13
- Fernando Forestieri – Málaga – 2009–10
- Matteo Gabbia – Villarreal – 2023–24
- Tiberio Guarente – Sevilla – 2010–12
- Ciro Immobile – Sevilla – 2015–16
- Mark Iuliano – Mallorca – 2004–06
- Luca Koleosho – Espanyol – 2021–23, 25–26
- Marco Lanna – Salamanca, Zaragoza – 1997–01
- Maurizio Lanzaro – Zaragoza – 2010–13
- Damiano Longhi – Hércules – 1996–97
- Samuele Longo – Espanyol, Rayo, Huesca – 2012–13, 13–14, 18–19
- Cristiano Lucarelli – Valencia – 1998–99
- **Luiz Felipe** – Betis, **Rayo** – 2022–24, 25–
- Enzo Maresca – Sevilla, Málaga – 2005–09, 10–12
- Emiliano Moretti – Valencia – 2004–09
- Thiago Motta – Barcelona, Atlético Madrid – 2001–08
- Daniel Osvaldo – Espanyol – 2009–11
- Christian Panucci – Real Madrid – 1996–99
- Giampaolo Pazzini – Levante – 2017–18
- Cristiano Piccini – Betis, Valencia – 2015–17, 18–20, 20–22
- Alessandro Pierini – Racing – 2004–05
- Federico Piovaccari – Eibar – 2014–15
- Alessandro Potenza – Mallorca – 2005–06
- **Matteo Prati** – **Racing** – 2026–
- **Giacomo Quagliata** – **Deportivo** – 2026–
- Giacomo Raspadori – Atlético Madrid – 2025–26
- Vincenzo Rennella – Betis – 2015–16
- Christian Riganò – Levante – 2007–08
- Fausto Rossi – Valladolid, Córdoba – 2013–15
- Giuseppe Rossi – Villarreal, Levante, Celta – 2007–12, 15–16, 16–17
- Matteo Ruggeri – Atlético Madrid – 2025–26
- Nicola Sansone – Villarreal – 2016–19
- Michele Serena – Atlético Madrid – 1998–99
- Salvatore Sirigu – Sevilla, Osasuna – 2016–17
- Roberto Soriano – Villarreal – 2016–18
- Stefano Sorrentino – Recreativo – 2007–08
- Marco Storari – Levante – 2007–08
- Alessio Tacchinardi – Villarreal – 2005–07
- Francesco Tavano – Valencia – 2006–07
- Damiano Tommasi – Levante – 2006–08
- Moreno Torricelli – Espanyol – 2002–04
- Stefano Torrisi – Atlético Madrid – 1998–99
- Giorgio Venturin – Atlético Madrid – 1998–00
- Daniele Verde – Valladolid – 2018–19
- Simone Verdi – Eibar – 2015–16
- Christian Vieri – Atlético Madrid – 1997–98
- Gianluca Zambrotta – Barcelona – 2006–08
- Simone Zaza – Valencia – 2016–18

=== Kosovo ===
- Vedat Muriqi – Mallorca – 2021–26

=== Latvia ===
- Māris Verpakovskis – Getafe – 2006–07

=== Lithuania ===
- Giedrius Arlauskis – Espanyol – 2015–16
- Edgaras Jankauskas – Real Sociedad – 1999–02
- Marius Stankevičius – Sevilla, Valencia – 2009–11

=== Malta ===
- Irvin Cardona – Espanyol – 2024–25

=== Montenegro ===
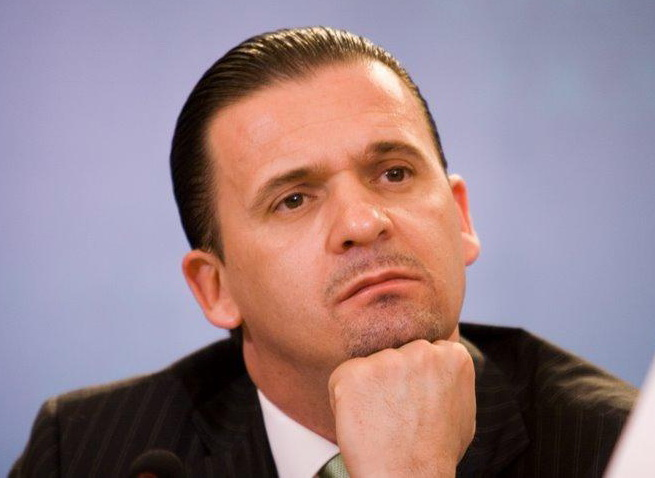
Predrag Mijatović in 2007

- Branko Brnović – Espanyol – 1994–00 – (Federal Republic of Yugoslavia) while active.
- Andrija Delibašić – Mallorca, Rayo – 2003–05, 11–13 – (Serbia and Montenegro) while active.
- Ardian Đokaj – Mallorca – 1999–00 – (Federal Republic of Yugoslavia) while active.
- Borislav Đurović – Valladolid – 1980–81 – (Socialist Federal Republic of Yugoslavia) while active.
- Igor Gluščević – Extremadura – 1996–97 – (Federal Republic of Yugoslavia) while active.
- Stevan Jovetić – Sevilla – 2016–17
- Miodrag Kustudić – Hércules – 1978–81 – (Socialist Federal Republic of Yugoslavia) while active.
- Predrag Mijatović – Valencia, Real Madrid – 1993–99 – (Federal Republic of Yugoslavia) while active.
- Milutin Osmajić – Cádiz – 2021–22, 23–24
- Željko Petrović – Sevilla – 1991–92 – (Socialist Federal Republic of Yugoslavia) while active.
- Vladimir Popović – Sporting – 1997–98 – (Federal Republic of Yugoslavia) while active.
- Esteban Saveljich – Rayo – 2021–23
- Stefan Savić – Atlético Madrid – 2015–24
- Nebojša Šćepanović – Oviedo – 1995–96 – (Federal Republic of Yugoslavia) while active.
- Nikola Vujadinović – Osasuna – 2016–17
- Nikola Vukčević – Levante – 2018–22

=== Netherlands ===
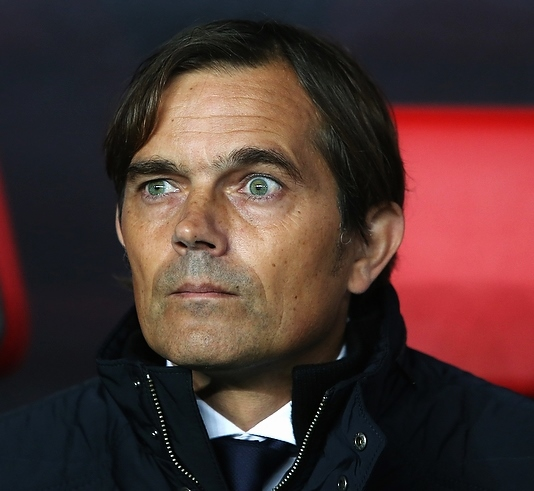
Phillip Cocu in 2015

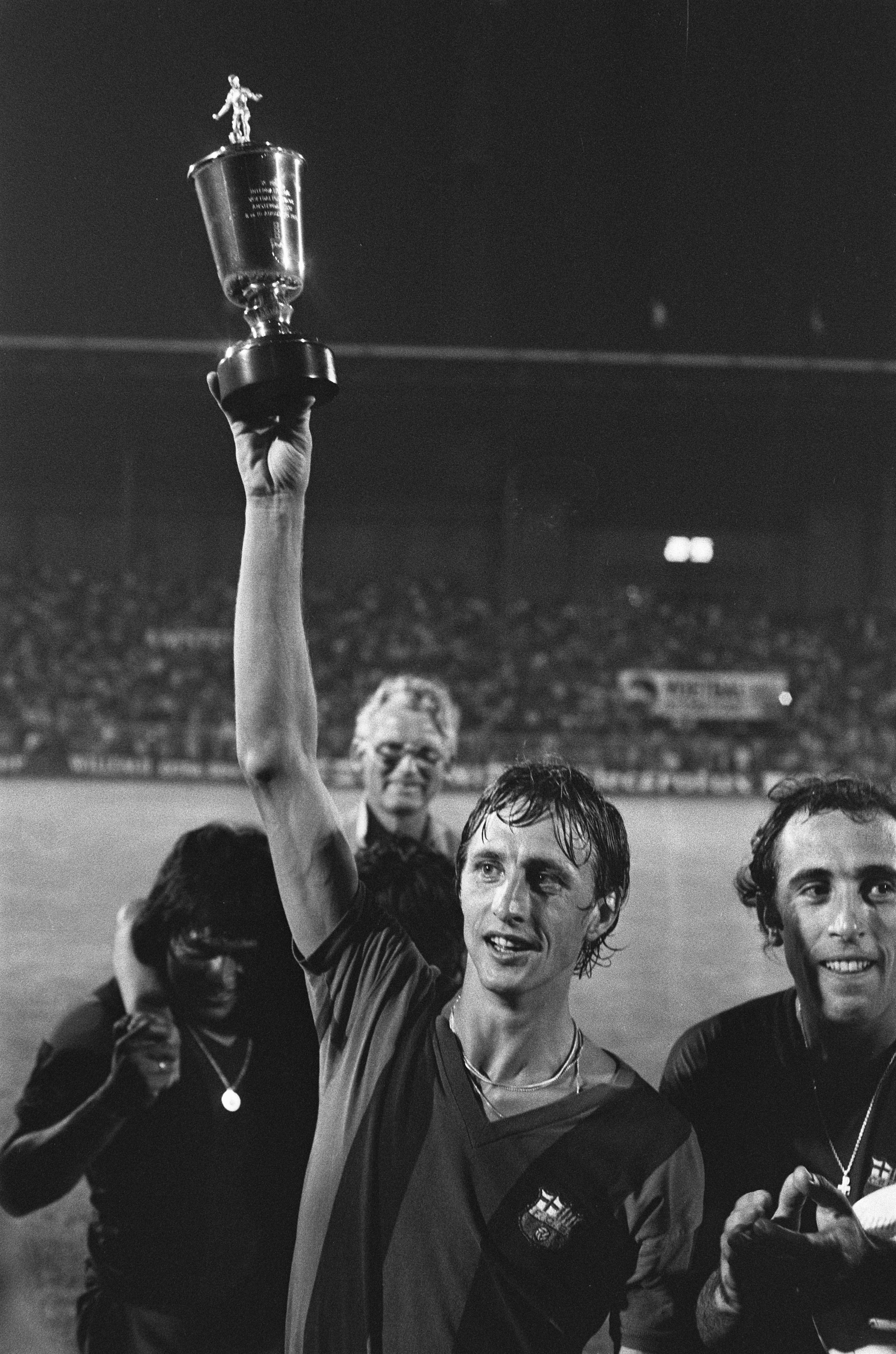
Johan Cruyff celebrating the Amsterdam Tournament with Barcelona in 1975

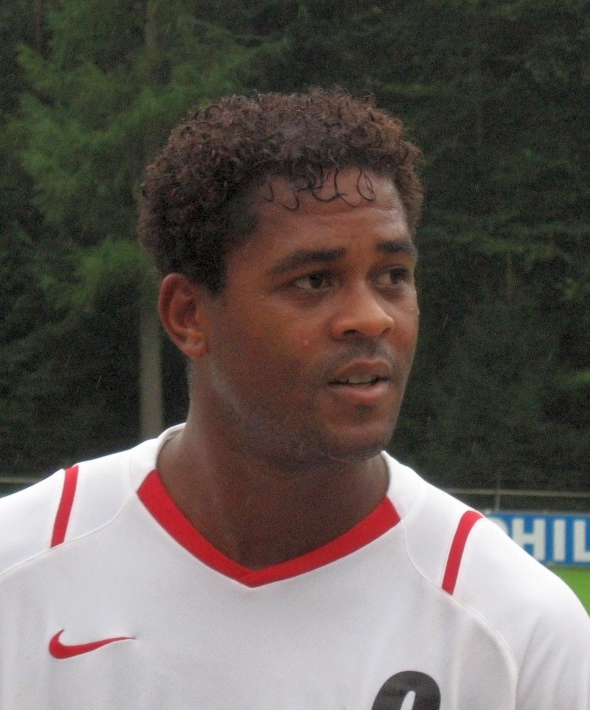
Patrick Kluivert in 2006

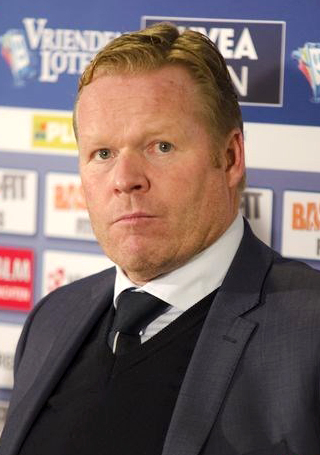
Ronald Koeman in 2014

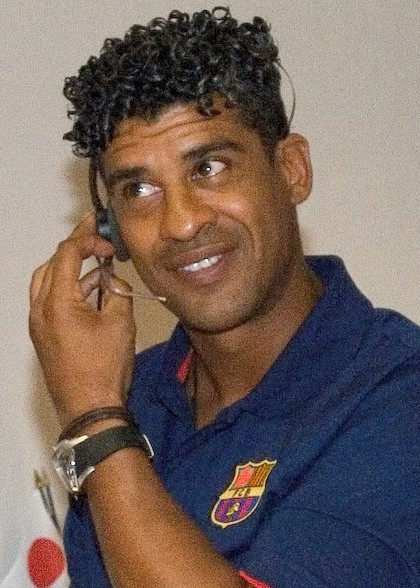
Frank Rijkaard as Barcelona manager in 2006

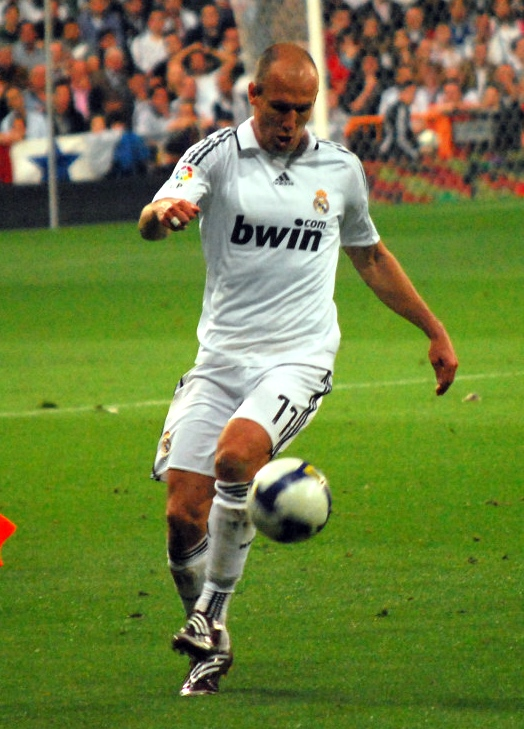
Arjen Robben playing for Real Madrid in 2009

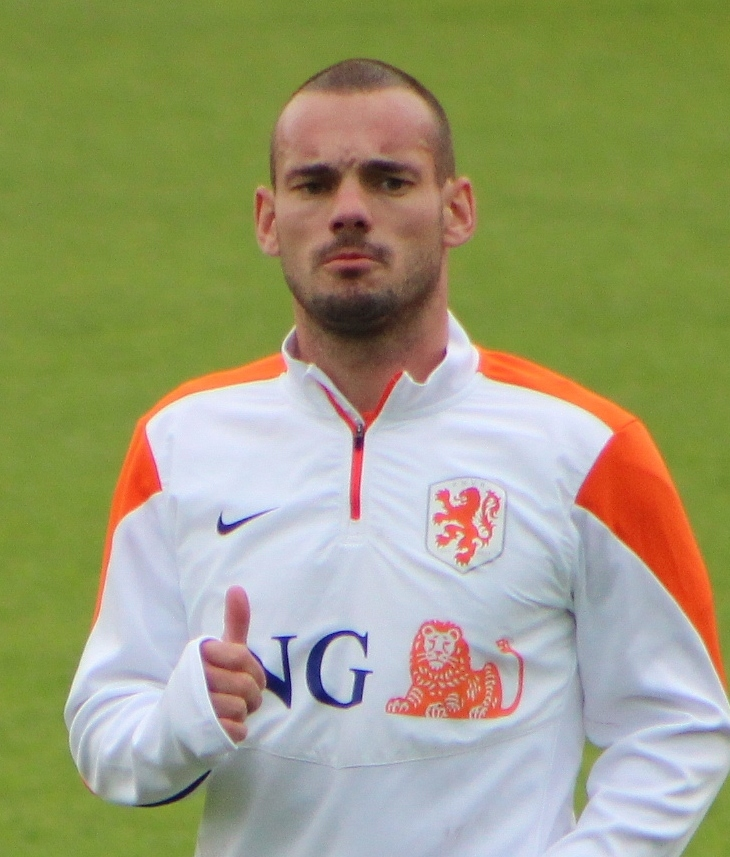
Wesley Sneijder in 2014

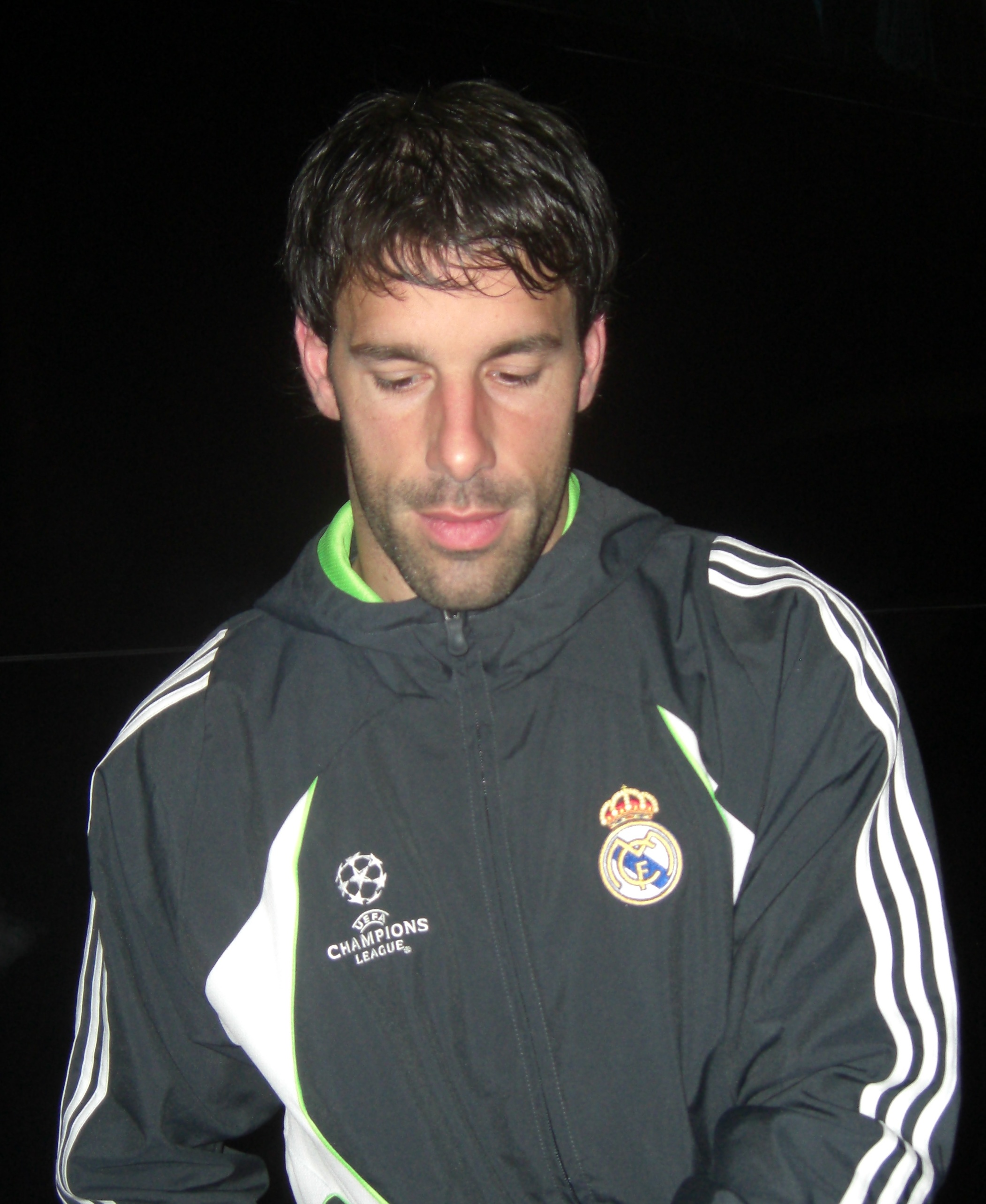
Ruud van Nistelrooy with Real Madrid in 2007

- Yassine Abdellaoui – Rayo – 1996–97
- Bobby Adekanye – Cádiz – 2020–21
- Ibrahim Afellay – Barcelona – 2010–12, 13–14
- Ryan Babel – Deportivo – 2016–17
- Daley Blind – Girona – 2023–26
- Kevin Bobson – Espanyol – 2003–04
- Frank de Boer – Barcelona – 1998–03
- Ronald de Boer – Barcelona – 1998–00
- Michel Boerebach – Real Burgos – 1992–93
- Winston Bogarde – Barcelona – 1997–00
- Khalid Boulahrouz – Sevilla – 2007–08
- Arnold Bruggink – Mallorca – 2003–04
- Jasper Cillessen – Barcelona, Valencia, Las Palmas – 2016–22, 24–25
- Phillip Cocu – Barcelona – 1998–04
- Jürgen Colin – Sporting – 2008–09
- Johan Cruyff – Barcelona – 1973–78
- Jordi Cruyff – Barcelona, Celta, Alavés, Espanyol – 1994–96, 98–99, 00–04
- **Arnaut Danjuma** – Villarreal, Girona, **Valencia** – 2021–23, 24–
- Edgar Davids – Barcelona – 2003–04
- Memphis Depay – Barcelona, Atlético Madrid – 2021–24
- Royston Drenthe – Real Madrid, Hércules – 2007–11
- **Denzel Dumfries** – **Real Madrid** – 2026–
- **Zakaria Eddahchouri** – **Deportivo** – 2026–
- **Teun Gijselhart** – **Deportivo** – 2026–
- Jonathan de Guzmán – Mallorca, Villarreal – 2010–12
- **Justin de Haas** – **Valencia** – 2026–
- **Quilindschy Hartman** – **Espanyol** – 2026–
- Jimmy Floyd Hasselbaink – Atlético Madrid – 1999–00
- John Heitinga – Atlético Madrid – 2008–09
- Ruud Hesp – Barcelona – 1997–00
- Wesley Hoedt – Celta – 2018–19
- Rick Hoogendorp – Celta – 1999–00
- Klaas-Jan Huntelaar – Real Madrid – 2008–09
- Ola John – Deportivo – 2016–17
- **Frenkie de Jong** – **Barcelona** – 2019–
- Luuk de Jong – Sevilla, Barcelona – 2019–22
- Justin Kluivert – Valencia – 2022–23
- Patrick Kluivert – Barcelona, Valencia – 1998–04, 05–06
- Ronald Koeman – Barcelona – 1989–95
- Jan Kromkamp – Villarreal – 2005–06
- Glenn Loovens – Zaragoza – 2012–13
- Hedwiges Maduro – Valencia, Sevilla – 2007–13
- Roy Makaay – Tenerife, Deportivo – 1997–03
- Joris Mathijsen – Málaga – 2011–12
- John Metgod – Real Madrid – 1982–84
- Gabriel Misehouy – Girona – 2024–25
- Gerrie Mühren – Betis – 1976–78
- Kizito "Kiki" Musampa – Málaga, Atlético Madrid – 1999–05
- Riga Mustapha – Levante – 2006–08
- Johan Neeskens – Barcelona – 1974–79
- Tarik Oulida – Sevilla – 1995–97
- Marc Overmars – Barcelona – 2000–04
- René Ponk – Compostela – 1997–98
- Quincy Promes – Sevilla – 2018–19
- Michael Reiziger – Barcelona – 1997–04
- Karim Rekik – Sevilla – 2020–23
- Johnny Rep – Valencia – 1975–77
- Daniël de Ridder – Celta – 2005–07
- Frank Rijkaard – Zaragoza – 1987–88
- Arjen Robben – Real Madrid – 2007–09
- Clarence Seedorf – Real Madrid – 1996–00
- Daley Sinkgraven – Las Palmas – 2023–25
- Wesley Sneijder – Real Madrid – 2007–09
- Mark van Bommel – Barcelona – 2005–06
- Giovanni van Bronckhorst – Barcelona – 2003–07
- Donny van de Beek – Girona – 2024–26
- Dave van den Bergh – Rayo – 1999–00
- Rafael van der Vaart – Real Madrid, Betis – 2008–10, 15–16
- Dick van Dijk – Murcia – 1974–75
- Ruud van Nistelrooy – Real Madrid, Málaga – 2006–10, 11–12
- **Kayne van Oevelen** – **Valencia** – 2026–
- Ricky van Wolfswinkel – Betis – 2015–16
- Piet Velthuizen – Hércules – 2010–11
- Juan Viedma – Compostela – 1996–98
- Ferdi Vierklau – Tenerife – 1997–99
- Tonny Vilhena – Espanyol – 2021–22
- Sander Westerveld – Real Sociedad, Mallorca – 2001–05
- Faas Wilkes – Valencia – 1953–56
- Richard Witschge – Barcelona, Alavés – 1991–93, 01–02
- Nordin Wooter – Zaragoza – 1997–99
- Boudewijn Zenden – Barcelona – 1998–01
- Gianni Zuiverloon – Mallorca – 2011–12

=== North Macedonia ===
- Enis Bardhi – Levante – 2017–22
- **Stole Dimitrievski** – Granada, Rayo, **Valencia** – 2014–15, 18–19, 21–
- Dragan Kanatlarovski – Deportivo – 1991–92
- Blagoja Kitanovski – Sabadell – 1987–88 – (Socialist Federal Republic of Yugoslavia) while active.
- Bojan Miovski – Girona – 2024–26
- Ilija Najdoski – Valladolid – 1993–94
- Mitko Stojkovski – Oviedo – 1995–97
- Aleksandar Trajkovski – Mallorca – 2019–20

=== Northern Ireland ===
- Gerry Armstrong – Mallorca – 1983–84
- Jim Hagan – Celta – 1987–89

=== Norway ===
- Jan Berg – Elche, Rayo – 1988–90
- John Carew – Valencia – 2000–03
- Vadim Demidov – Real Sociedad, Celta – 2010–12, 12–13
- Dan Eggen – Celta, Alavés – 1997–03
- Frode Grodås – Racing – 1998–99
- Bjørn Tore Kvarme – Real Sociedad – 2001–04
- Ørjan Nyland – Sevilla – 2023–26
- Martin Ødegaard – Real Madrid, Real Sociedad – 2014–15, 19–21
- Frode Olsen – Sevilla – 1999–00, 01–02
- Knut Olav Rindarøy – Deportivo – 2010–11
- Sigurd Rushfeldt – Racing – 1999–01
- **Alexander Sørloth** – Real Sociedad, Villarreal, **Atlético Madrid** – 2021–22, 22–
- Jørgen Strand Larsen – Celta – 2022–24

=== Poland ===
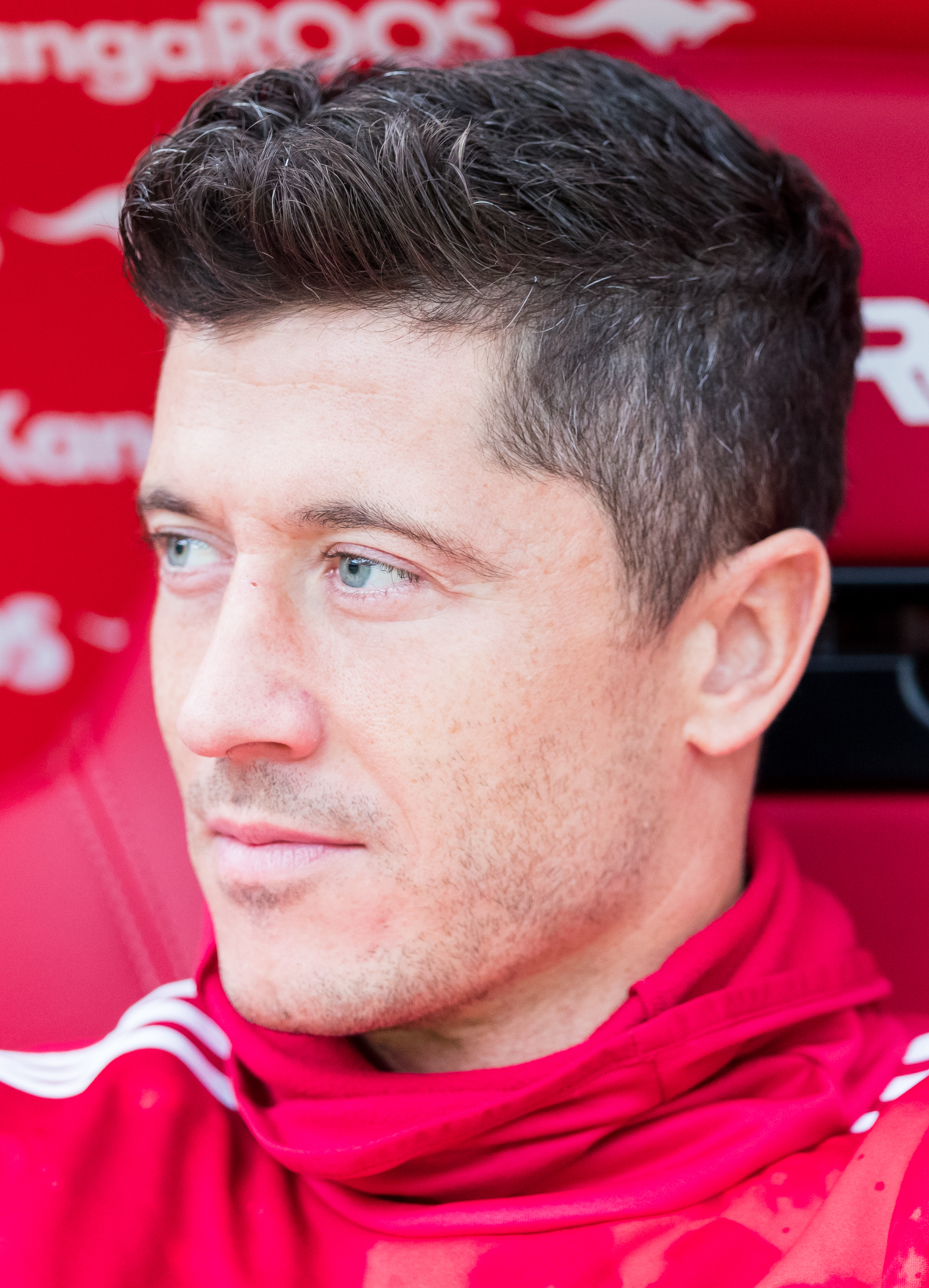
Robert Lewandowski in 2019

- Wolfgang April – Sabadell – 1986–87
- Jerzy Dudek – Real Madrid – 2007–11
- Dariusz Dudka – Levante – 2012–13
- **Bright Ede** – **Deportivo** – 2026–
- Kamil Jóźwiak – Granada – 2023–24
- Damian Kądzior – Eibar – 2020–21
- Roman Kosecki – Osasuna, Atlético Madrid – 1992–95
- Wojciech Kowalczyk – Betis – 1994–97
- Grzegorz Krychowiak – Sevilla – 2014–16
- Cezary Kucharski – Sporting – 1997–98
- Grzegorz Lewandowski – Logroñés – 1993–94
- Robert Lewandowski – Barcelona – 2022–26
- Bartłomiej Pawłowski – Málaga – 2013–14
- Damien Perquis – Betis – 2012–14
- Kamil Piątkowski – Granada – 2023–24
- Eugen Polanski – Getafe – 2008–09
- Jerzy Podbrożny – Mérida – 1997–98
- Ebi Smolarek – Racing – 2007–08
- Ryszard Staniek – Osasuna – 1993–94
- **Wojciech Szczęsny** – **Barcelona** – 2024–
- Jan Tomaszewski – Hércules – 1981–82
- Mirosław Trzeciak – Osasuna – 2000–01
- Przemysław Tytoń – Elche, Deportivo – 2014–15, 16–18
- Jan Urban – Osasuna, Valladolid – 1989–95
- Cezary Wilk – Deportivo – 2014–15
- Jacek Ziober – Osasuna – 1993–94

=== Portugal ===
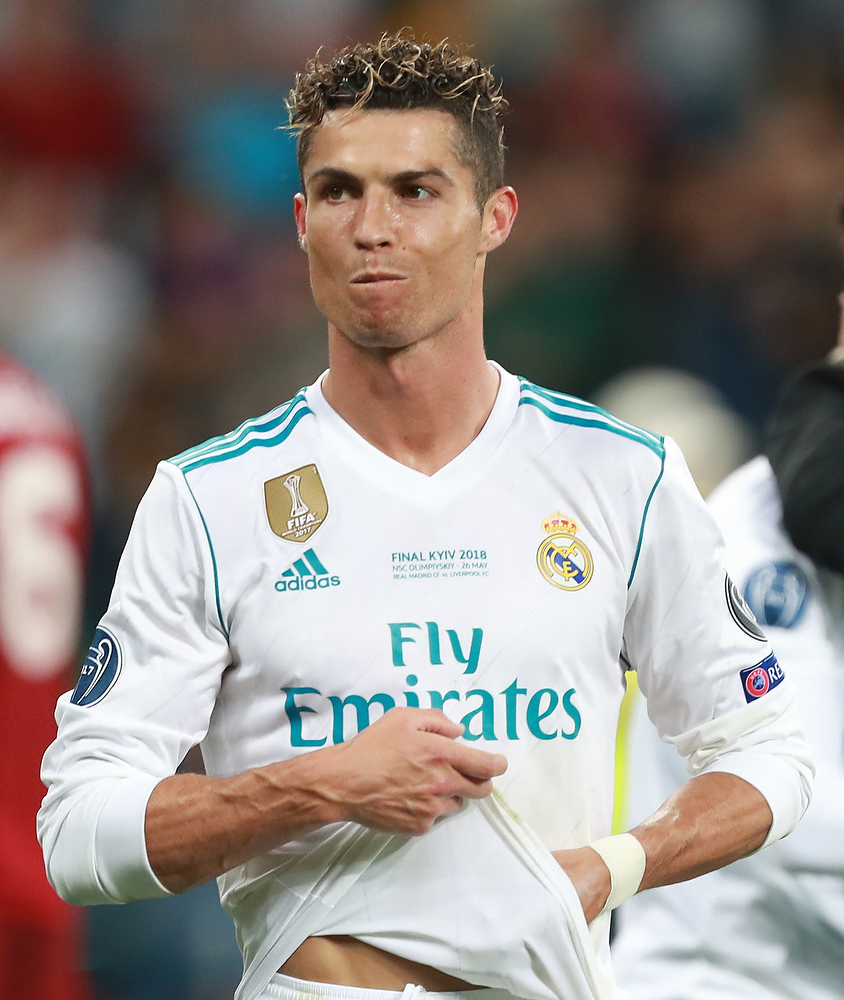
Cristiano Ronaldo with Real Madrid in 2018

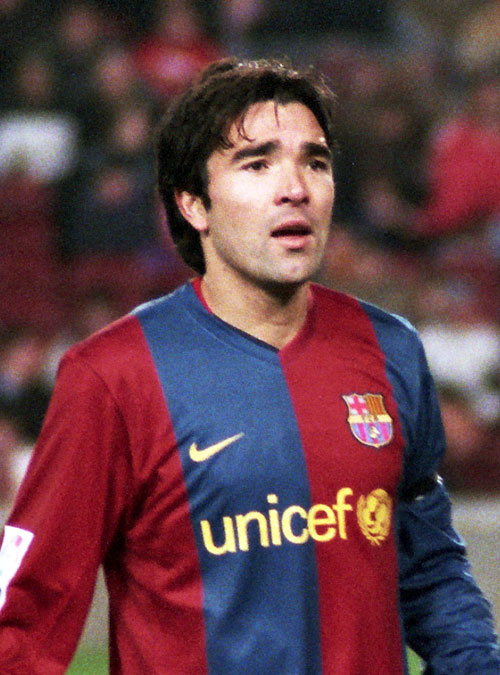
Deco playing for Barcelona in 2006

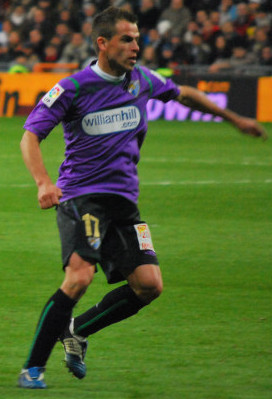
Duda playing for Málaga in 2010

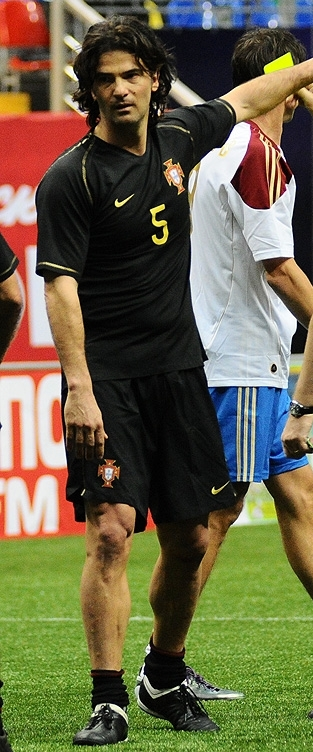
Fernando Couto in 2011

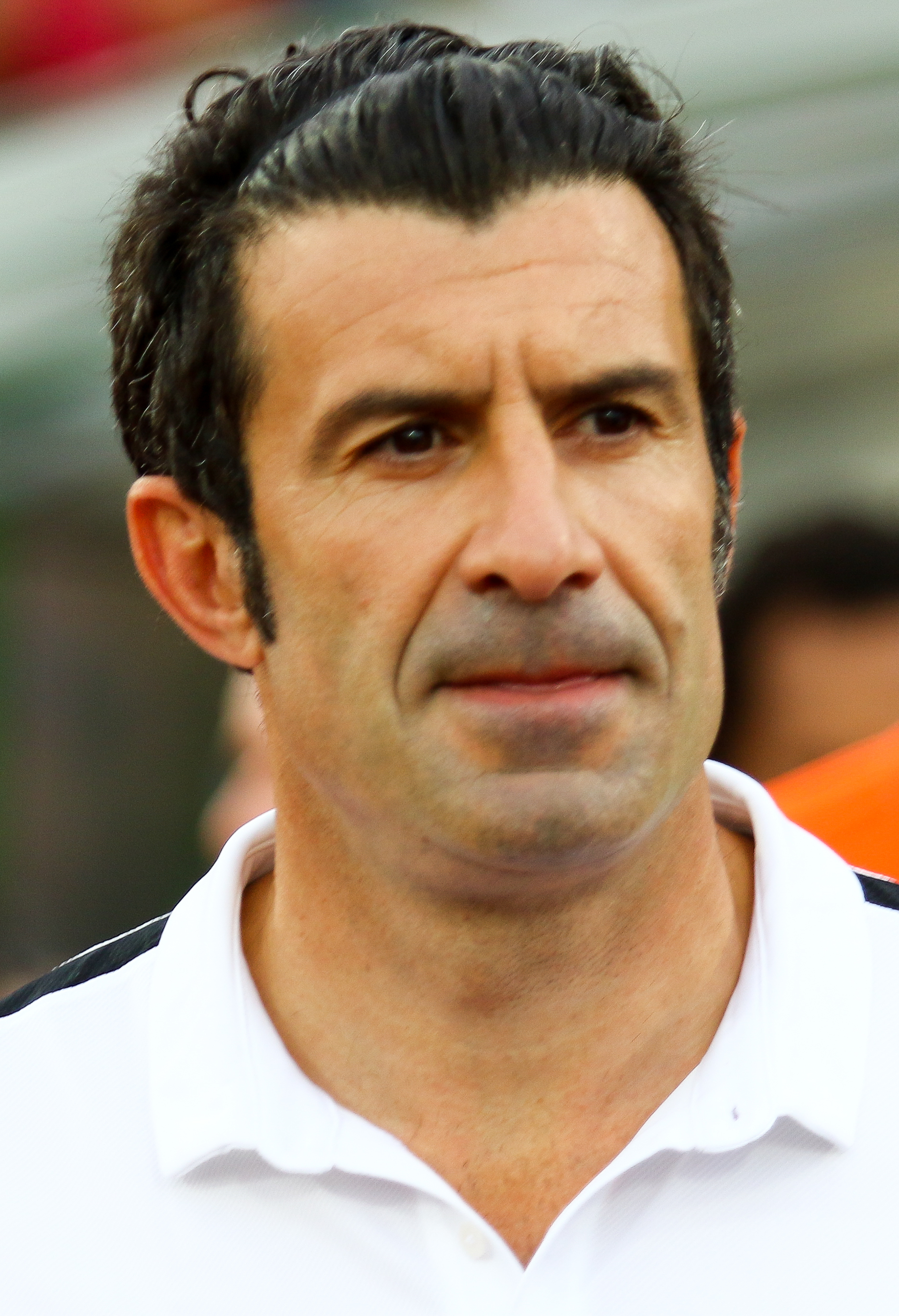
Luís Figo in 2017

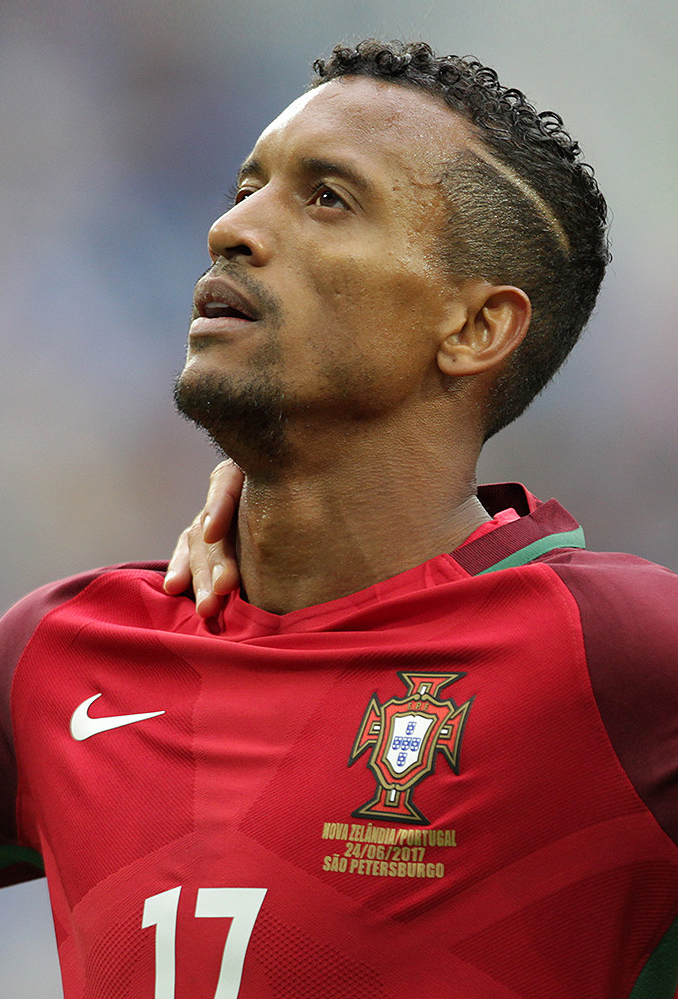
Nani in 2017

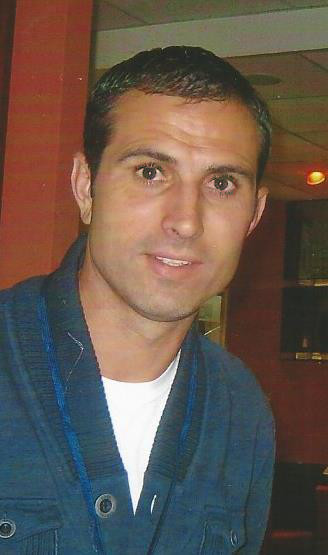
Pauleta in 2012

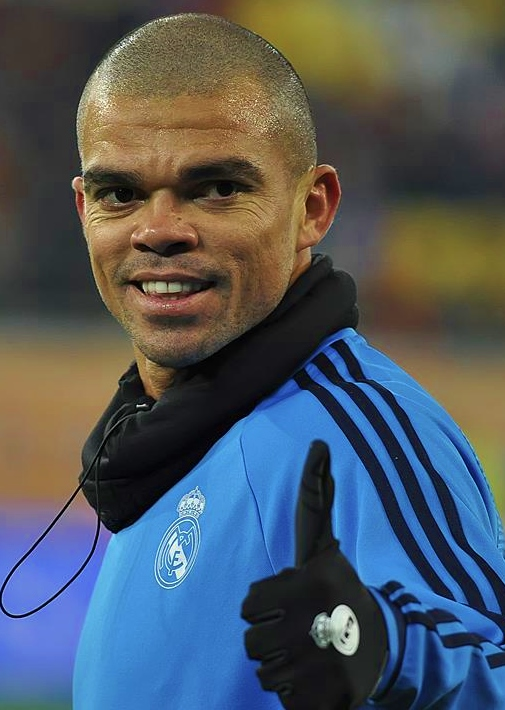
Pepe training with Real Madrid in 2015

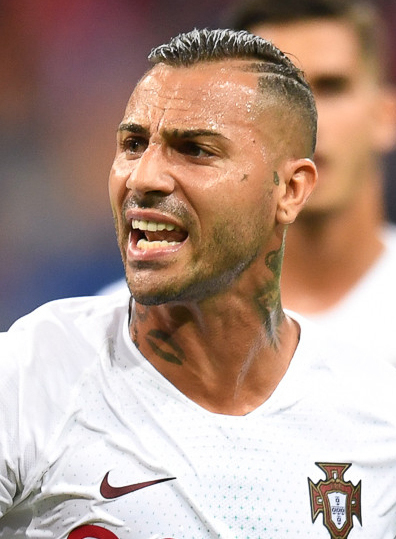
Ricardo Quaresma in 2018

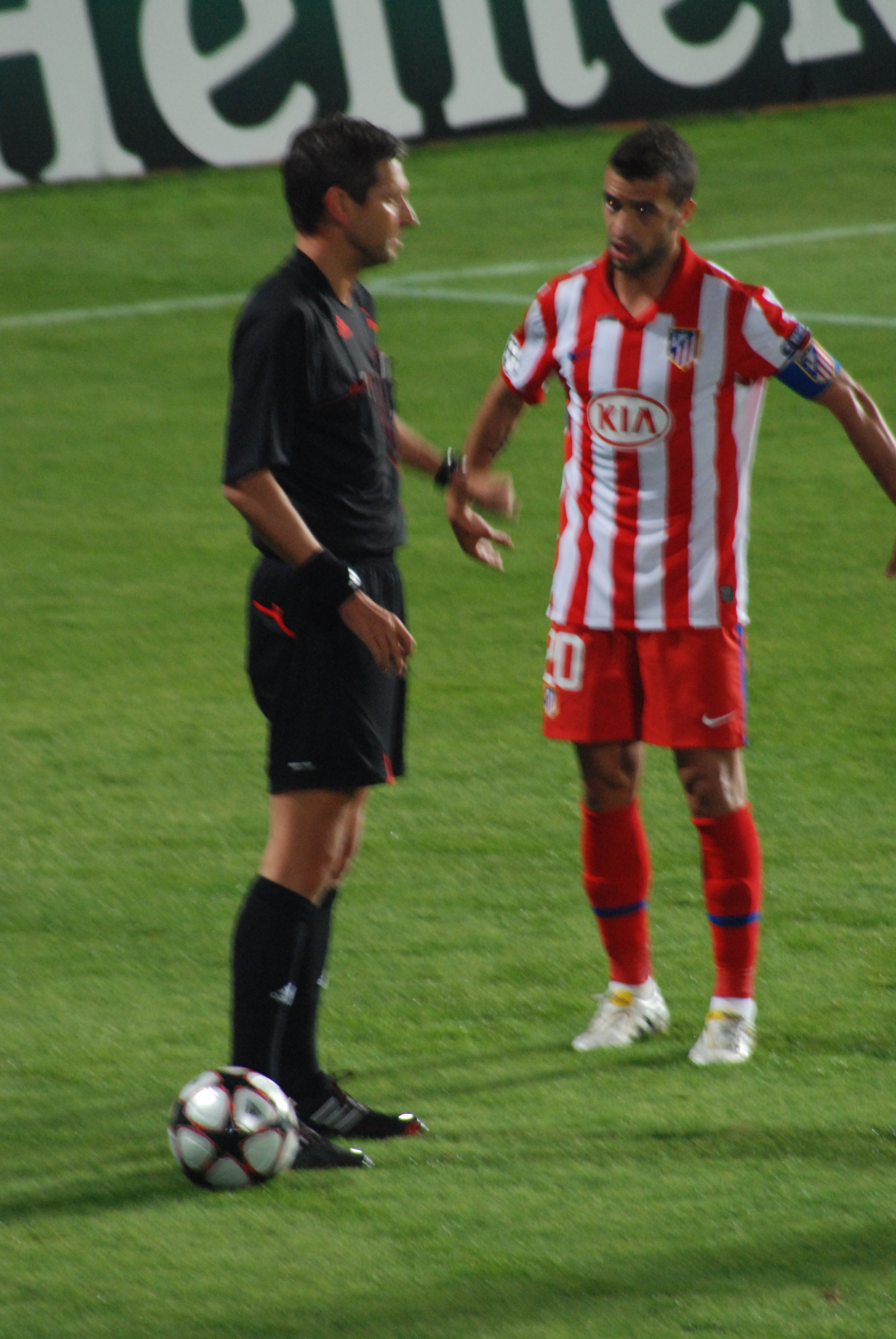
Simão (right) speaking with a referee during a match for Atlético Madrid in 2009

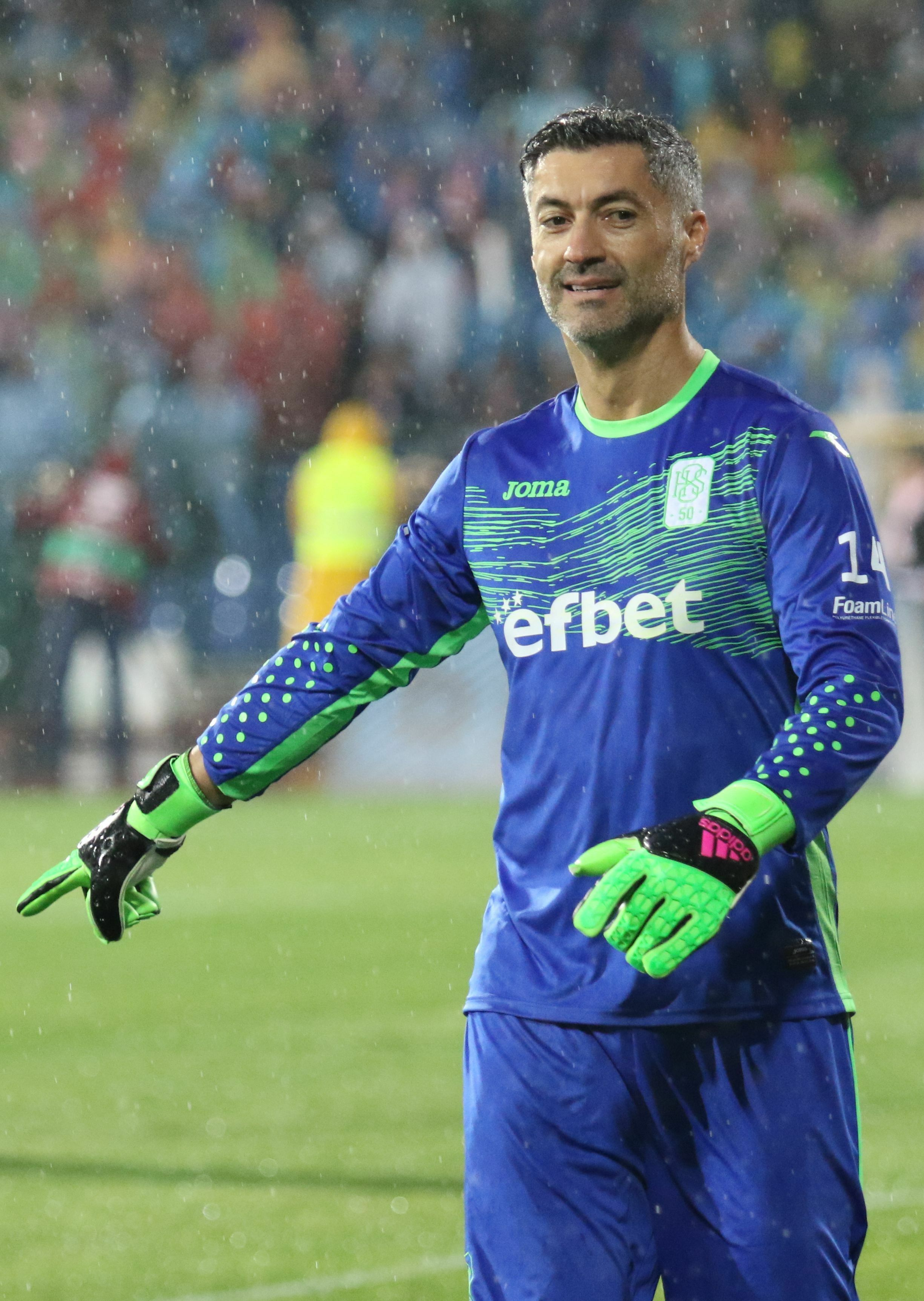
Vítor Baía in 2016

- Abel Xavier – Oviedo – 1996–98
- Agostinho – Málaga – 1999–01
- **André Almeida** – Valencia, **Racing** – 2022–
- André Castro – Sporting – 2010–12
- André Ferreira – Granada, Valladolid – 2023–24, 24–25
- André Gomes – Valencia, Barcelona – 2014–18
- André Santos – Deportivo – 2012–13
- André Silva – Sevilla, Real Sociedad, Elche – 2018–19, 23–24, 25–26
- António Oliveira – Betis – 1979–80
- Ariza Makukula – Valladolid, Sevilla, Gimnàstic – 2003–05, 06–07
- Bakero – Sevilla – 1999–00
- **Bernardo Silva** – **Real Madrid** – 2026–
- Beto – Recreativo – 2006–09
- Beto – Sevilla – 2012–16
- Bino – Tenerife – 2001–02
- Bruma – Real Sociedad – 2015–16
- Bruno Caires – Celta – 1997–00
- Bruno Gama – Deportivo – 2012–13, 16–18
- Carlos Gomes – Granada, Oviedo – 1958–61
- Carlos Martins – Recreativo, Granada – 2007–08, 11–12
- Carlos Secretário – Real Madrid – 1996–97
- Carlos Xavier – Real Sociedad – 1991–94
- César Brito – Salamanca – 1997–98
- Chaínho – Zaragoza – 2001–02
- Chiquinho – Mallorca – 2024–25
- Costinha – Atlético Madrid – 2006–07
- Cristiano Ronaldo – Real Madrid – 2009–18
- Dani – Atlético Madrid – 2002–03
- Daniel Candeias – Granada – 2014–15
- Daniel Carriço – Sevilla – 2013–20
- Dário Essugo – Las Palmas – 2024–25
- Deco – Barcelona – 2004–08
- Dino – Salamanca – 1998–99
- Diogo Figueiras – Sevilla – 2013–15, 15–16
- Diogo Salomão – Deportivo – 2012–13, 14–15
- Domingos – Tenerife – 1997–99
- Domingos Duarte – Granada, Getafe – 2019–26
- Domingos Quina – Granada, Elche – 2020–21, 22–23
- Duda – Málaga, Sevilla – 2001–02, 03–17
- Dyego Sousa – Almería – 2022–23
- Edgar – Málaga – 1999–03, 03–06
- Edinho – Málaga – 2009–11
- Edmundo Graça – Sevilla – 1958–59
- Eliseu – Málaga, Zaragoza – 2008–09, 09–14
- Emílio Peixe – Sevilla – 1995–96
- Espinho – Málaga – 2015–16
- **Fábio Cardoso** – **Sevilla** – 2025–
- Fábio Coentrão – Real Madrid – 2011–15, 16–17
- Fábio Felício – Real Sociedad – 2006–07
- Fábio Silva – Las Palmas – 2024–25
- **Félix Correia** – **Sevilla** – 2026–
- Fernando Couto – Barcelona – 1996–98
- Fernando Gomes – Sporting – 1980–82
- Fernando Meira – Zaragoza – 2011–12
- Ferro – Valencia – 2020–21
- Flávio Ferreira – Málaga – 2013–16
- Florentino Luís – Getafe – 2021–22
- Francisco Trincão – Barcelona – 2020–21
- Francisco Vital – Betis – 1979–80
- Gelson Martins – Atlético Madrid – 2018–19
- Gil Dias – Granada – 2019–20
- Gomes Bravo – Real Sociedad – 1947–48, 49–50
- **Gonçalo Guedes** – Valencia, Villarreal, **Real Sociedad** – 2017–22, 23–24, 25–
- Gonçalo Paciência – Celta – 2022–23
- Hélder Baptista – Rayo – 1999–05
- Hélder Cristóvão – Deportivo – 1996–98, 00–02
- Hélder Lopes – Las Palmas – 2016–17
- Hélder Postiga – Zaragoza, Valencia, Deportivo – 2011–14, 14–15
- Hélder Rosário – Málaga – 2008–11
- Henrique Sereno – Valladolid – 2012–13
- Hernâni – Levante – 2019–20
- Hugo Leal – Atlético Madrid – 1999–00
- Hugo Porfírio – Racing – 1997–98
- Hugo Viana – Valencia, Osasuna – 2005–09
- Ivan Cavaleiro – Deportivo – 2014–15
- Jastin García – Girona – 2023–24
- João Alves – Salamanca – 1976–78
- João Cancelo – Valencia, Barcelona – 2014–17, 23–24
- João Félix – Atlético Madrid, Barcelona – 2019–23, 23–24
- João Pereira – Valencia – 2012–14
- João Tomás – Betis – 2001–03
- Jordão – Zaragoza – 1976–77
- Jorge Andrade – Deportivo – 2002–07
- Jorge Cadete – Celta – 1997–99
- Jorge Gonçalves – Racing – 2008–09
- Jorge Ribeiro – Málaga – 2005–06
- José Calado – Betis – 2001–03
- José Nunes – Mallorca – 2005–13
- Jota – Valladolid – 2020–21
- Kévin Rodrigues – Real Sociedad, Leganés, Eibar, Rayo – 2016–22
- Licá – Rayo – 2014–15
- Litos – Málaga – 2001–06
- Luís Figo – Barcelona, Real Madrid – 1995–05
- Luisinho – Deportivo, Huesca – 2014–19, 20–21
- Luís Martins – Granada – 2014–15, 16–17
- Luís Maximiano – Granada, Almería – 2021–22, 23–24
- Maniche – Atlético Madrid – 2006–08, 08–09
- Manuel Fernandes – Valencia – 2007–08, 08–11
- Marco Caneira – Valencia – 2004–06, 07–08
- Mário Silva – Cádiz – 2005–06
- **Martim Neto** – **Elche** – 2025–
- Miguel – Valencia – 2005–12
- Miguel Areias – Celta – 2006–07
- Miguel Cardoso – Deportivo – 2015–16
- Miguel Crespo – Rayo – 2023–24
- Miguel Lopes – Granada – 2015–16
- Nani – Valencia – 2016–17
- Nélson Marcos – Betis, Osasuna, Almería – 2008–09, 10–13, 13–14
- Nélson Oliveira – Deportivo – 2012–13
- Nélson Semedo – Barcelona – 2017–20
- Nuno – Deportivo, Osasuna – 1996–98, 00–02
- Nuno Luís – Salamanca – 1998–99
- Oceano – Real Sociedad – 1991–94
- Pauleta – Salamanca, Deportivo – 1997–00
- Paulo Bento – Oviedo – 1996–00
- Paulo Futre – Atlético Madrid – 1987–93, 97–98
- Paulo Oliveira – Eibar – 2017–21
- Paulo Sousa – Espanyol – 2001–02
- Paulo Torres – Salamanca – 1997–98
- Pepe – Real Madrid – 2007–17
- Pizzi – Atlético Madrid, Deportivo, Espanyol – 2011–14
- Portugués – Deportivo – 1942–46
- Quinito – Racing – 1975–78
- Rafa Soares – Eibar – 2019–21
- **Renato Veiga** – **Villarreal** – 2025–
- Ricardo Carvalho – Real Madrid – 2010–13
- Ricardo Costa – Valencia, Granada – 2010–14, 15–16
- Ricardo Horta – Málaga – 2014–16
- Ricardo Pereira – Betis – 2007–09
- Ricardo Quaresma – Barcelona – 2003–04
- Ricardo Sá Pinto – Real Sociedad – 1997–00
- Rogério – Salamanca – 1997–99
- Rony Lopes – Sevilla – 2019–20
- Rúben Micael – Zaragoza – 2011–12
- Rúben Semedo – Villarreal, Huesca – 2017–19
- Rúben Vezo – Valencia, Granada, Levante – 2013–22
- Rui Fonte – Espanyol – 2010–13
- Rui Silva – Granada, Betis – 2019–25
- Salvador Agra – Betis – 2012–13
- Samú Costa – Almería, Mallorca – 2022–26
- Silvestre Varela – Recreativo – 2007–08
- Sílvio – Atlético Madrid, Deportivo – 2011–13
- Simão – Barcelona, Atlético Madrid, Espanyol – 1999–01, 07–11, 12–14
- José Taira – Salamanca – 1997–99
- Thierry Correia – Valencia – 2019–26
- Tiago – Atlético Madrid – 2009–17
- Tiago Ilori – Granada – 2013–14
- Tiago Gomes – Hércules – 2010–11
- Tomás Tavares – Alavés – 2020–21
- Tulipa – Salamanca – 1997–98
- Victoriano Bastos – Zaragoza – 1975–77
- Vítor Baía – Barcelona – 1996–99
- Vítor Damas – Racing – 1976–79
- Vitorino Antunes – Málaga, Getafe – 2012–15, 17–20
- William Carvalho – Betis – 2018–25
- Wilson Manafá – Granada – 2023–24
- Zé Castro – Atlético Madrid, Deportivo, Rayo – 2006–11, 12–16

=== Republic of Ireland ===
- John Aldridge – Real Sociedad – 1989–91
- Liam Buckley – Racing – 1986–87
- Alan Campbell – Racing – 1984–86
- Matt Doherty – Atlético Madrid – 2022–23
- John Patrick Finn – Getafe – 2020–21, 24–25
- Steve Finnan – Espanyol – 2008–09
- Ashley Grimes – Osasuna – 1989–90
- Ian Harte – Levante – 2004–05, 06–07
- Kevin Moran – Sporting – 1988–90
- **Aarón Ochoa** – **Málaga** – 2026–
- **Troy Parrott** – **Betis** – 2026–
- Michael Robinson – Osasuna – 1986–89

=== Romania ===
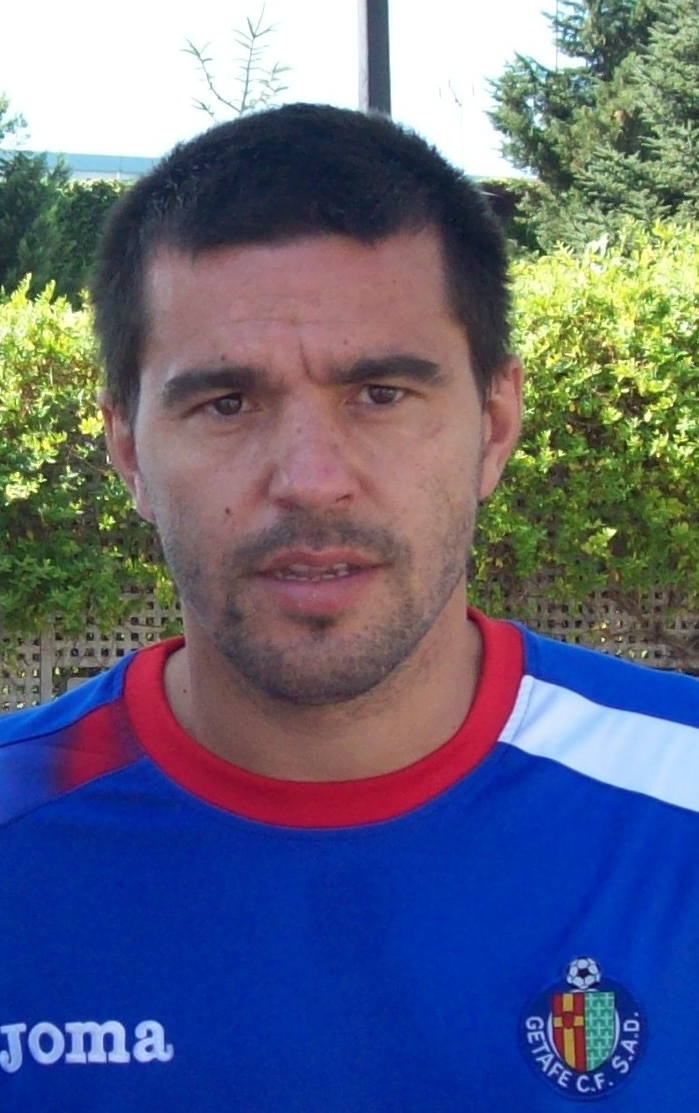
Cosmin Contra with Getafe in 2009

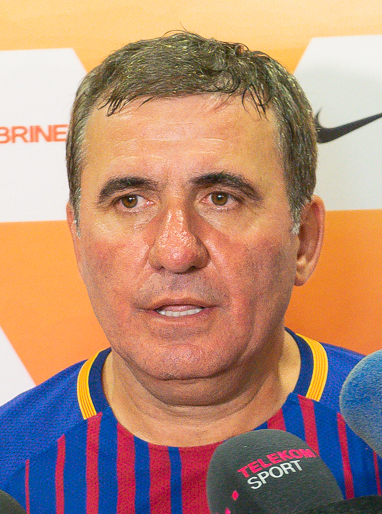
Gheorghe Hagi after playing in a Barcelona legends match in 2018

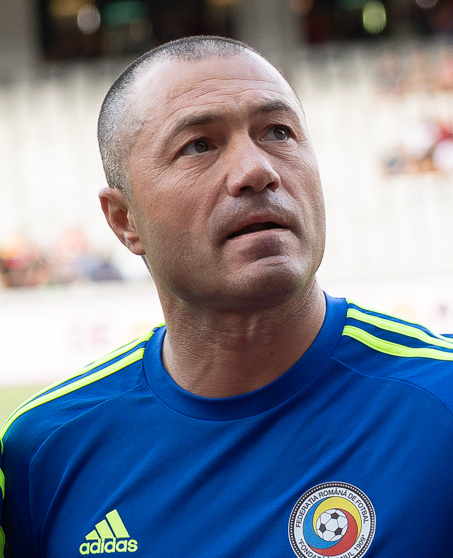
Adrian Ilie in 2018

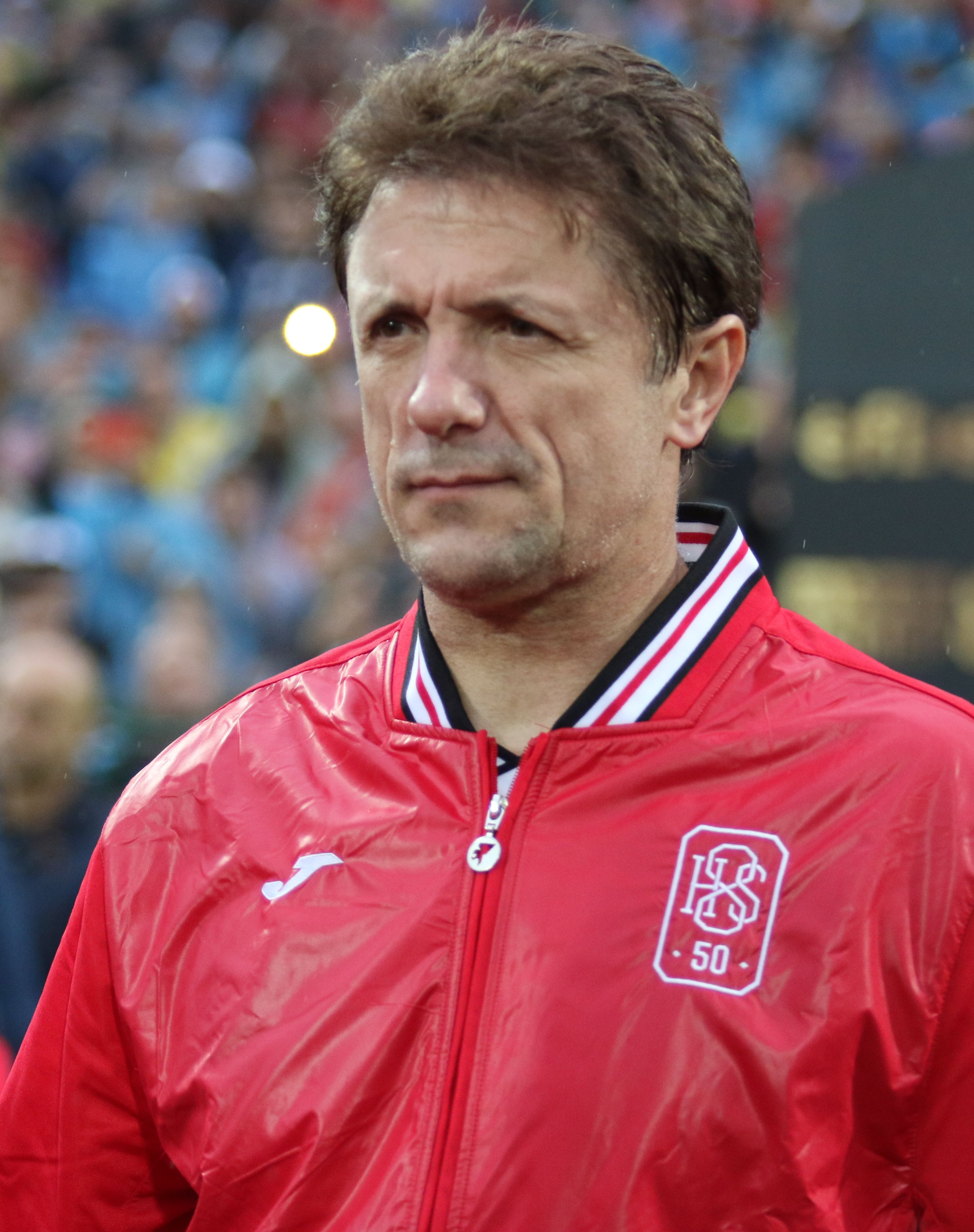
Gica Popescu in 2016

- Florin Andone – Córdoba, Deportivo, Cádiz – 2014–15, 16–18, 21–22
- Gavril Balint – Real Burgos – 1990–93
- Constantin Barbu – Numancia – 1999–01
- Miodrag Belodedici – Valencia, Valladolid – 1992–95
- Cosmin Contra – Alavés, Atlético Madrid, Getafe – 1999–01, 02–04, 05–10
- Gică Craioveanu – Real Sociedad, Villarreal, Getafe – 1995–99, 00–02, 04–06
- Ilie Dumitrescu – Sevilla – 1994–95
- Iulian Filipescu – Betis – 1998–00, 01–03
- Constantin Gâlcă – Espanyol, Villarreal – 1997–03
- Cristian Ganea – Athletic Bilbao – 2018–19
- Gheorghe Hagi – Real Madrid, Barcelona – 1990–92, 94–96
- Ianis Hagi – Alavés – 2023–24
- Adrian Ilie – Valencia, Alavés – 1997–03
- Marius Iordache – Villarreal – 1998–99
- Marius Lăcătuș – Oviedo – 1991–93
- Silviu Lung – Logroñés – 1990–91
- Bogdan Mara – Alavés – 2001–03
- Ciprian Marica – Getafe – 2013–14
- Lucian Marinescu – Salamanca – 1998–99
- Dorin Mateuț – Zaragoza – 1990–93
- Horațiu Moldovan – Oviedo – 2025–26
- Cătălin Munteanu – Salamanca, Espanyol, Albacete – 1998–99, 01–02, 03–04
- Costel Pantilimon – Deportivo – 2017–18
- Gabriel Popescu – Salamanca, Valencia, Numancia – 1997–00
- Gheorghe Popescu – Barcelona – 1995–97
- Daniel Prodan – Atlético Madrid – 1996–98
- Cristian Pulhac – Hércules – 2010–11
- **Ionuț Radu** – **Celta** – 2025–
- Claudiu Răducanu – Espanyol – 2003–04
- Florin Răducioiu – Espanyol – 1994–96, 96–97
- Răzvan Raț – Rayo – 2013–14, 15–16
- **Andrei Rațiu** – **Rayo** – 2023–
- Laurențiu Roșu – Numancia, Recreativo – 2000–01, 06–08
- Raul Rusescu – Sevilla – 2013–14
- Marcel Sabou – Tenerife, Sporting – 1990–91, 93–96
- Cristian Săpunaru – Zaragoza, Elche – 2012–14
- László Sepsi – Racing – 2008–10
- Dennis Șerban – Valencia – 1998–00, 01–02
- Nicolae Simatoc – Barcelona, Oviedo – 1950–53
- Bogdan Stelea – Mallorca, Salamanca – 1991–92, 97–99
- Ovidiu Stîngă – Salamanca – 1995–96
- Gabriel Tamaș – Celta – 2006–07
- Alexandru Țîrlea – Alavés – 2021–22
- Gabriel Torje – Granada, Espanyol – 2012–14
- Alin Toșca – Betis – 2016–18

=== Russia ===
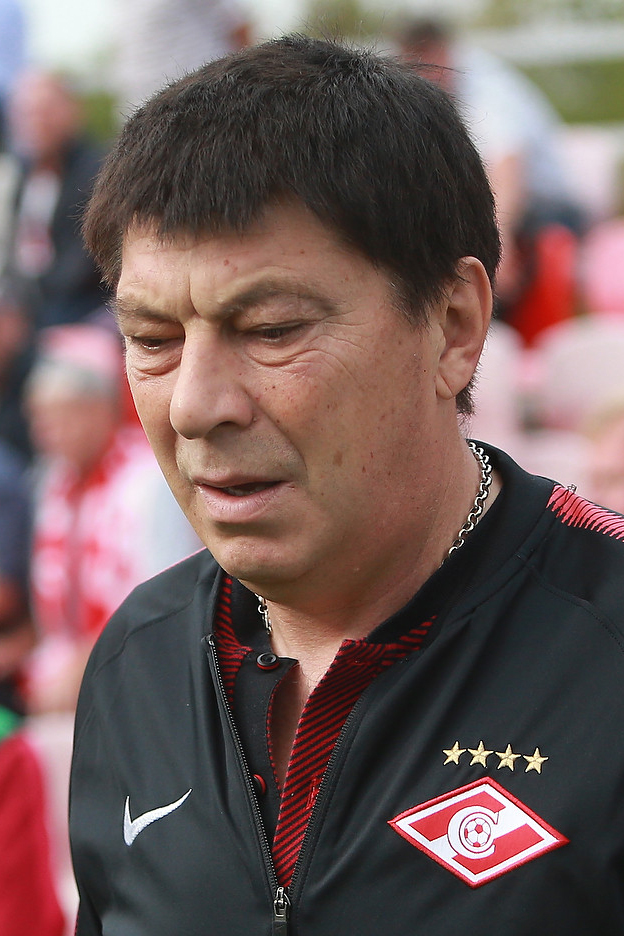
Rinat Dasayev in 2017

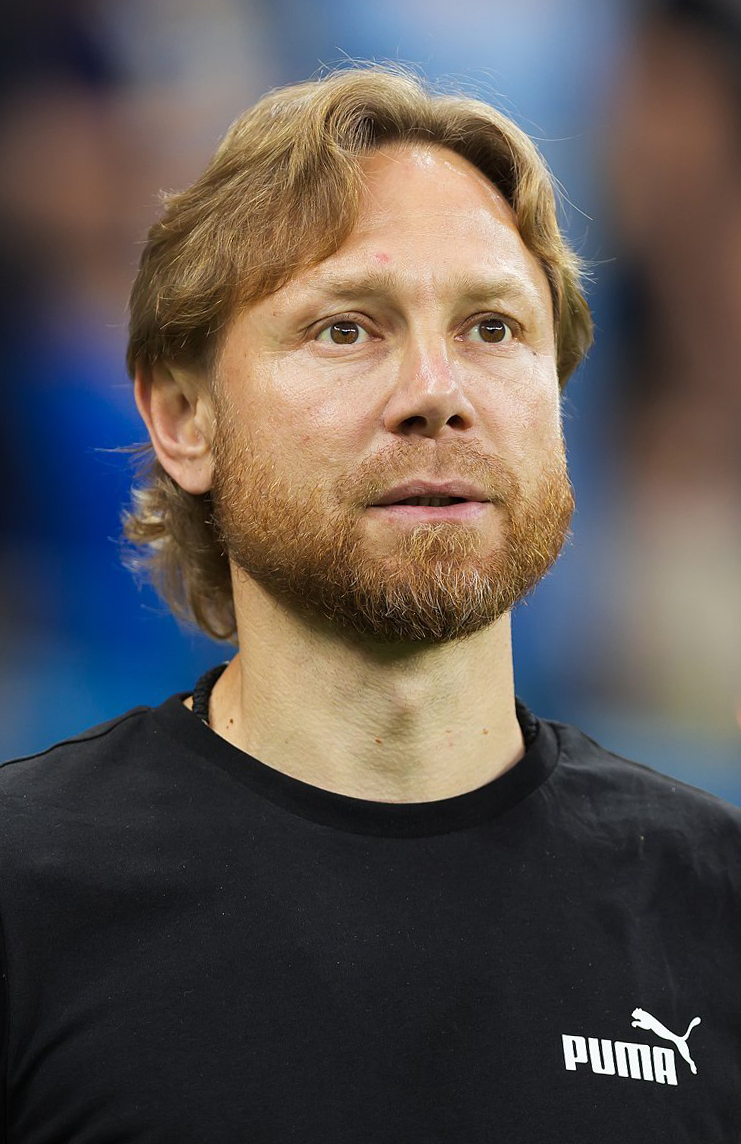
Valeri Karpin in 2022

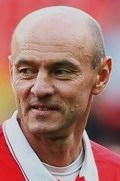
Viktor Onopko in 2014

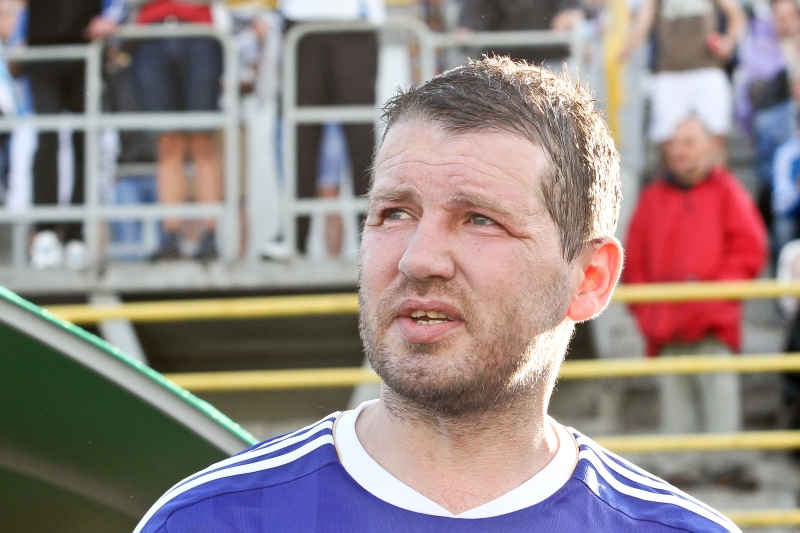
Oleg Salenko in 2014

- Vladimir Beschastnykh – Racing – 1996–01
- Denis Cheryshev – Sevilla, Villarreal, Real Madrid, Valencia – 2013–22
- Dmitri Cheryshev – Sporting – 1996–98
- Rinat Dasaev – Sevilla – 1988–90 – (Soviet Union) while active.
- Igor Dobrovolski – Castellón, Atlético Madrid – 1990–91, 94–95 – (Soviet Union) while active.
- Ilshat Fayzulin – Racing – 1995–97
- Dmitri Galyamin – Espanyol – 1991–93 – (Soviet Union) while active.
- Nikita Iosifov – Villarreal – 2021–22
- Valeri Karpin – Real Sociedad, Valencia, Celta – 1994–05
- Aleksandr Kerzhakov – Sevilla – 2006–08
- Dmitri Khokhlov – Real Sociedad – 1999–03
- Igor Korneev – Espanyol, Barcelona – 1991–93, 94–95 – (Soviet Union) while active.
- Aleksei Kosolapov – Sporting – 1997–98
- Dmitri Kuznetsov – Espanyol – 1991–93, 94–95 – (Soviet Union) while active.
- Igor Lediakhov – Sporting – 1994–98
- Andrei Moj – Espanyol, Hércules – 1991–93, 96–97 – (Soviet Union) while active.
- Aleksandr Mostovoi – Celta – 1996–04
- Yuri Nikiforov – Sporting – 1996–98
- Viktor Onopko – Oviedo, Rayo – 1995–01, 02–03
- Nikolai Pisarev – Mérida – 1995–96
- Evgeni Plotnikov – Albacete – 1996–97
- Dmitri Popov – Racing, Compostela – 1993–98
- Dmitri Radchenko – Racing, Deportivo, Rayo, Mérida – 1993–98
- Vladislav Radimov – Zaragoza – 1996–00
- Oleg Salenko – Logroñés, Valencia – 1992–95
- Edgar Sevikyan – Levante – 2020–21
- Sergei Shustikov – Racing – 1996–97, 98–00
- Igor Simutenkov – Tenerife – 2001–02
- Fyodor Smolov – Celta – 2019–20
- Dmitri Ulyanov – Racing – 1996–97
- **Arsen Zakharyan** – **Real Sociedad** – 2023–

=== Scotland ===
- Steve Archibald – Barcelona – 1984–87
- Oliver Burke – Alavés – 2019–20
- Jordan Holsgrove – Celta – 2020–21
- Alan Hutton – Mallorca – 2012–13
- Oliver McBurnie – Las Palmas – 2024–25
- Scott McKenna – Las Palmas – 2024–25
- Ted McMinn – Sevilla – 1987–88
- Kieran Tierney – Real Sociedad – 2023–24
- **Robbie Ure** – **Sevilla** – 2026–
- John Fox Watson – Real Madrid – 1948–49

=== Serbia ===
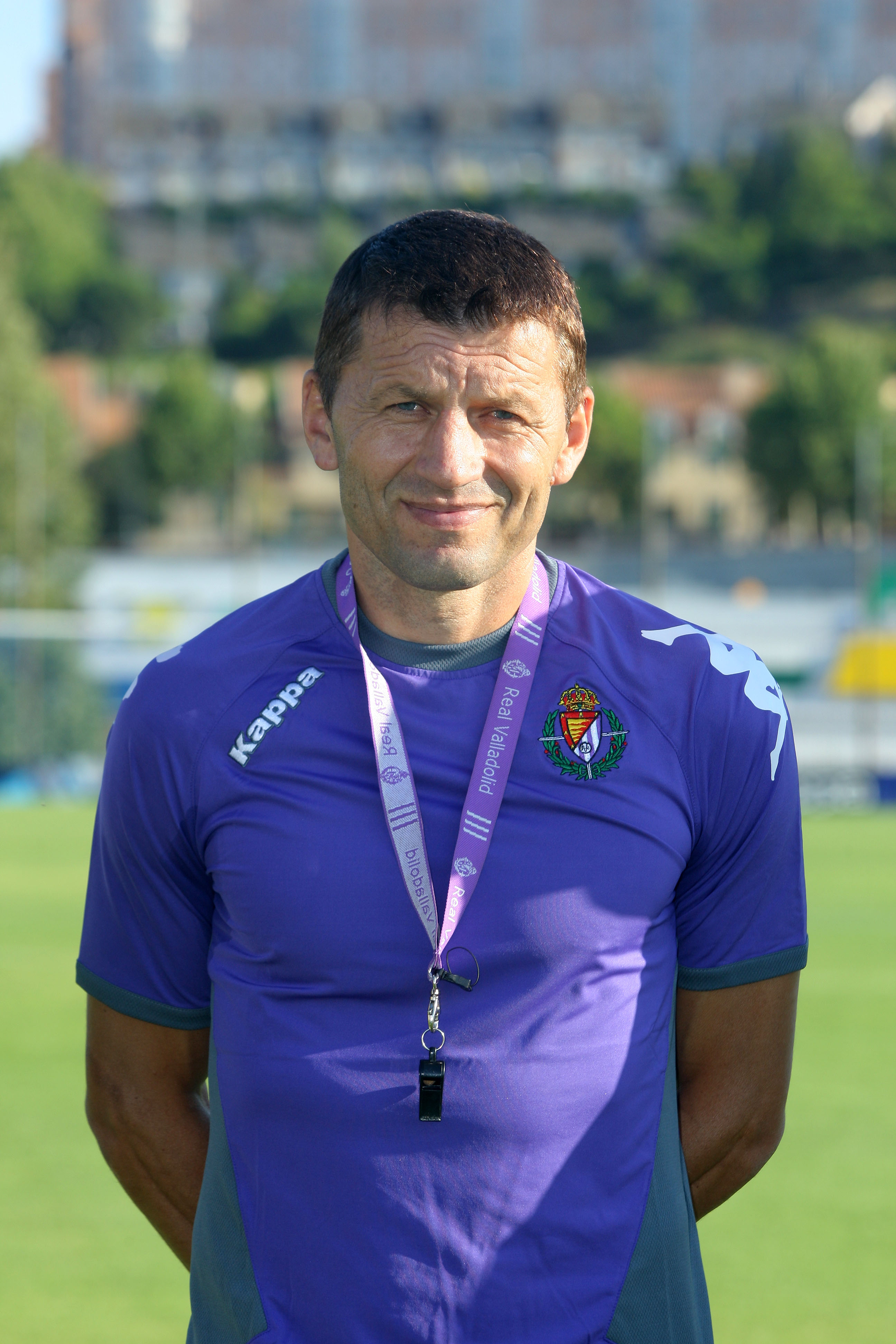
Miroslav Đukić as Valladolid manager in 2012

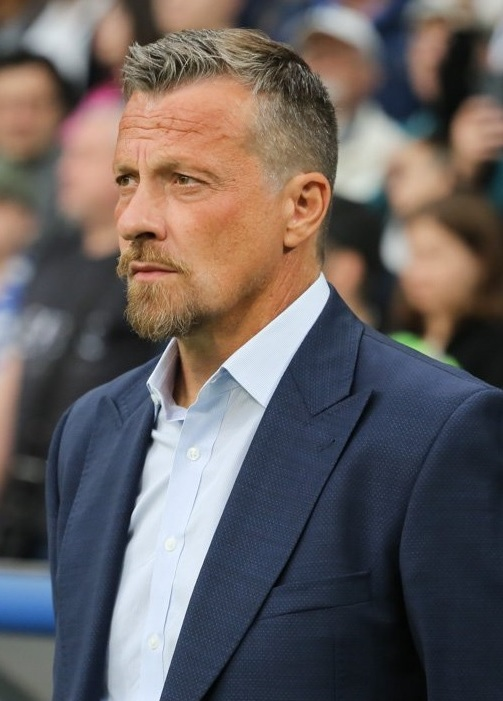
Slaviša Jokanović in 2022

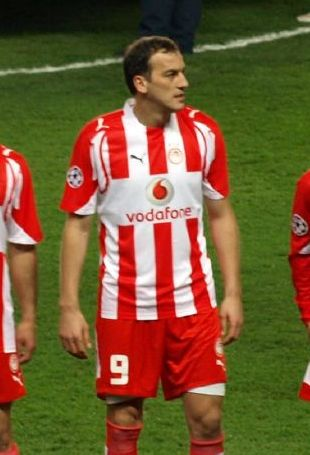
Darko Kovačević in 2008

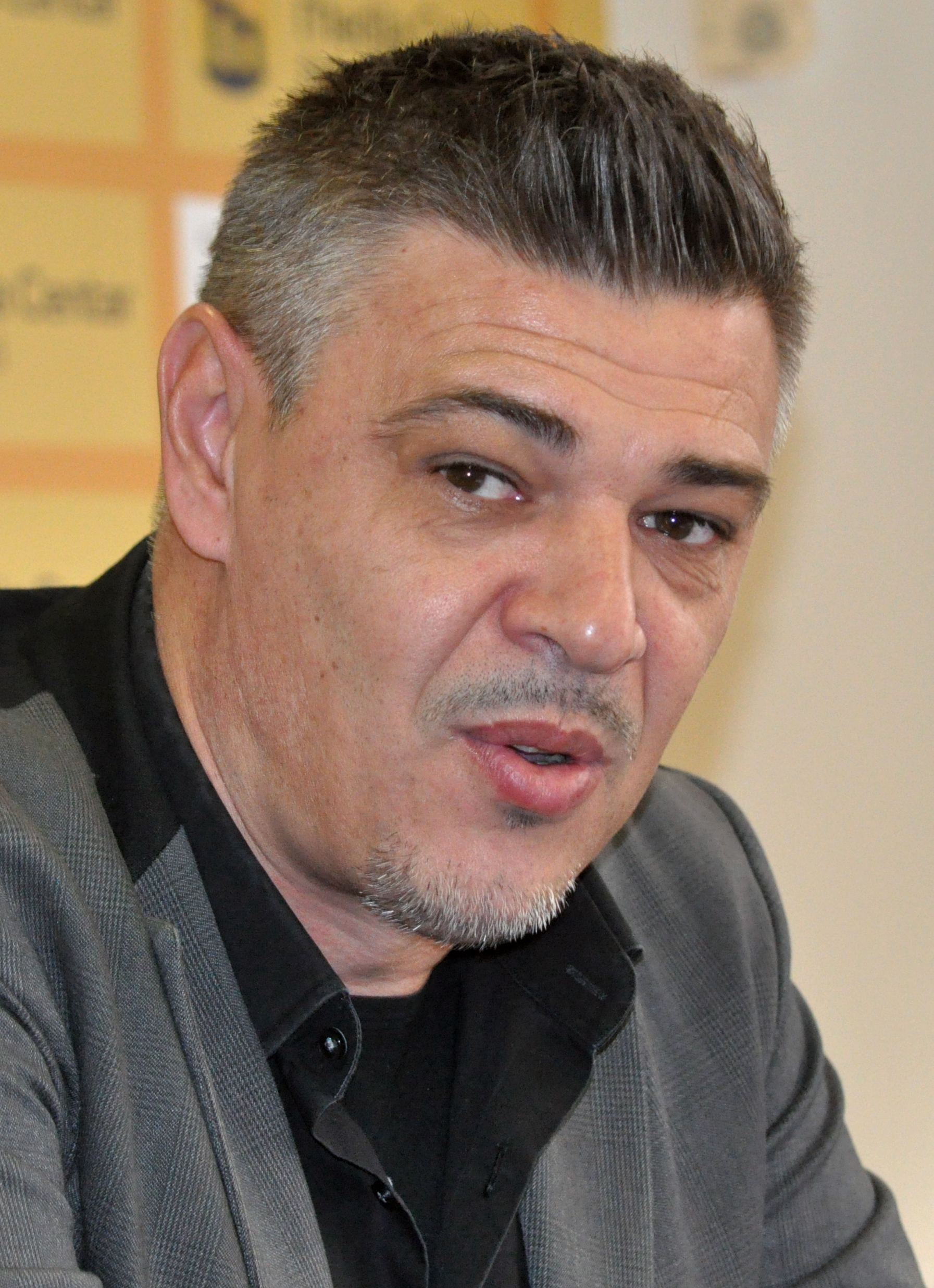
Savo Milošević in 2017

- Ivan Adžić – Logroñés – 1996–97 – (Federal Republic of Yugoslavia) while active.
- Miodrag Anđelković – Espanyol – 1996–97 – (Federal Republic of Yugoslavia) while active.
- Radomir Antić – Zaragoza – 1978–80 – (Socialist Federal Republic of Yugoslavia) while active.
- Aleksandar Aranđelović – Atlético Madrid – 1952–53 – (Socialist Federal Republic of Yugoslavia) while active.
- Srđan Babić – Almería – 2022–24
- Stefan Babović – Zaragoza – 2012–13
- Srđan Bajčetić – Celta – 1994–97 – (Federal Republic of Yugoslavia) while active.
- **Veljko Birmančević** – **Getafe** – 2025–
- Goran Bogdanović – Espanyol, Extremadura – 1995–97, 98–99 – (Federal Republic of Yugoslavia) while active.
- Rade Bogdanović – Atlético Madrid – 1997–98 – (Federal Republic of Yugoslavia) while active.
- Darko Brašanac – Betis, Leganés, Alavés, Osasuna – 2016–24, 24–25
- Rajko Brežančić – Huesca – 2018–19
- Miloš Bursać – Celta – 1992–93 – (Federal Republic of Yugoslavia) while active.
- Goran Čaušić – Osasuna – 2016–17
- Željko Cicović – Las Palmas – 2000–02 – (Federal Republic of Yugoslavia) while active.
- Dragan Ćirić – Barcelona, Valladolid – 1997–99, 00–04 – (Federal Republic of Yugoslavia) while active.
- Vladimir Ćulafić – Cádiz – 1981–82 – (Socialist Federal Republic of Yugoslavia) while active.
- Vladan Dimitrijević – Albacete – 1993–94 – (Federal Republic of Yugoslavia) while active.
- Milovan Đorić – Oviedo – 1973–74 – (Socialist Federal Republic of Yugoslavia) while active.
- Goran Đorović – Celta, Deportivo – 1997–03 – (Federal Republic of Yugoslavia) while active.
- Miroslav Đukić – Deportivo, Valencia – 1991–03 – (Socialist Federal Republic of Yugoslavia) – (Federal Republic of Yugoslavia) while active.
- **Marko Dmitrović** – Eibar, Sevilla, Leganés, **Espanyol** – 2017–
- Ivica Dragutinović – Sevilla – 2005–11
- Dejan Dražić – Celta – 2015–16
- Miloš Drizić – Rayo – 1989–90 – (Socialist Federal Republic of Yugoslavia) while active.
- Goran Drulić – Zaragoza – 2001–02, 03–05 – (Serbia and Montenegro) while active.
- Ratomir Dujković – Oviedo – 1975–76 – (Socialist Federal Republic of Yugoslavia) while active.
- Ljubomir Fejsa – Alavés – 2019–20
- **Nemanja Gudelj** – Sevilla, **Getafe** – 2019–
- Luka Ilić – Oviedo – 2025–26
- Saša Ilić – Celta – 2003–04 – (Serbia and Montenegro) while active.
- Dragan Isailović – Valladolid – 1998–00 – (Federal Republic of Yugoslavia) while active.
- Boško Janković – Mallorca – 2006–07
- Milan Janković – Real Madrid – 1986–88 – (Socialist Federal Republic of Yugoslavia) while active.
- Slaviša Jokanović – Oviedo, Tenerife, Deportivo – 1993–00 – (Federal Republic of Yugoslavia) while active.
- Aleksandar Jovanović – Huesca – 2018–19
- Luka Jović – Real Madrid – 2019–21, 21–22
- Vladimir Jugović – Atlético Madrid – 1998–99 – (Federal Republic of Yugoslavia) while active.
- Dragi Kaličanin – Zaragoza – 1985–86 – (Socialist Federal Republic of Yugoslavia) while active.
- Atila Kasaš – Logroñés – 1994–95 – (Federal Republic of Yugoslavia) while active.
- Aleksandar Katai – Alavés – 2016–18
- Ilija Katić – Burgos – 1976–77 – (Socialist Federal Republic of Yugoslavia) while active.
- Mateja Kežman – Atlético Madrid – 2005–06 – (Serbia and Montenegro) while active.
- Slobodan Komljenović – Zaragoza – 2001–02 – (Federal Republic of Yugoslavia) while active.
- Bogdan Korak – Murcia – 1987–89 – (Socialist Federal Republic of Yugoslavia) while active.
- Darko Kovačević – Real Sociedad – 1996–99, 01–07 – (Serbia and Montenegro) while active.
- Nenad Krstičić – Alavés – 2016–17
- Vladan Kujović – Levante – 2007–08
- Zdravko Kuzmanović – Málaga – 2016–18
- Dejan Lekić – Osasuna, Eibar – 2010–12, 14–15
- Dragoje Leković – Sporting – 1997–98 – (Federal Republic of Yugoslavia) while active.
- Saša Lukić – Levante – 2017–18
- Vladan Lukić – Atlético Madrid – 1992–93 – (Federal Republic of Yugoslavia) while active.
- Nemanja Maksimović – Valencia, Getafe – 2017–24
- Filip Malbašić – Cádiz – 2020–21
- Nikola Maraš – Rayo – 2021–22
- Zoran Marić – Celta – 1987–90 – (Socialist Federal Republic of Yugoslavia) while active.
- Dejan Marković – Logroñés – 1993–95, 96–97 – (Federal Republic of Yugoslavia) while active.
- Milan Martinović – Oviedo – 2000–01 – (Federal Republic of Yugoslavia) while active.
- Božur Matejić – Castellón – 1990–91 – (Socialist Federal Republic of Yugoslavia) while active.
- Zlatomir Mićanović – Salamanca, Málaga – 1983–85 – (Socialist Federal Republic of Yugoslavia) while active.
- Duško Milinković – Osasuna – 1988–89 – (Socialist Federal Republic of Yugoslavia) while active.
- Nemanja Miljanović – Hércules, Salamanca – 1996–97, 97–98 – (Federal Republic of Yugoslavia) while active.
- Goran Milojević – Mallorca, Celta – 1991–92, 95–96 – (Socialist Federal Republic of Yugoslavia) – (Federal Republic of Yugoslavia) while active.
- Goran Milošević – Espanyol – 1997–99 – (Federal Republic of Yugoslavia) while active.
- Savo Milošević – Zaragoza, Espanyol, Celta, Osasuna – 1998–00, 01–07 – (Serbia and Montenegro) while active.
- Branko Milovanović – Deportivo – 1995–96 – (Federal Republic of Yugoslavia) while active.
- Marko Milovanović – Almería – 2022–24
- Nenad Mirosavljević – Cádiz – 2005–06 – (Serbia and Montenegro) while active.
- Stefan Mitrović – Valladolid, Getafe – 2013–14, 21–24
- Dragan Mladenović – Real Sociedad – 2004–05 – (Serbia and Montenegro) while active.
- Albert Nađ – Betis, Oviedo – 1996–01 – (Federal Republic of Yugoslavia) while active.
- Matija Nastasić – Mallorca, Leganés – 2022–25
- Zoran Njeguš – Atlético Madrid, Sevilla – 1998–00, 01–04 – (Serbia and Montenegro) while active.
- Ivan Obradović – Zaragoza – 2009–13
- Perica Ognjenović – Real Madrid – 1998–01 – (Federal Republic of Yugoslavia) while active.
- Aleksandar Pantić – Villarreal, Córdoba, Eibar, Alavés – 2013–17
- Milinko Pantić – Atlético Madrid – 1995–98 – (Federal Republic of Yugoslavia) while active.
- Veljko Paunović – Atlético Madrid, Mallorca, Oviedo, Getafe, Almería – 1996–02, 03–05, 05–08 – (Serbia and Montenegro) while active.
- Dejan Petković – Real Madrid, Sevilla, Racing – 1995–97 – (Federal Republic of Yugoslavia) while active.
- Njegoš Petrović – Granada – 2021–22, 23–24
- Dragomir Racić – Castellón – 1981–82 – (Socialist Federal Republic of Yugoslavia) while active.
- Uroš Račić – Valencia – 2020–22
- Nemanja Radoja – Celta, Levante – 2014–18, 19–22
- Nemanja Radonjić – Mallorca – 2023–24
- Aleksandar Radovanović – Almería – 2023–24
- Predrag Rajković – Mallorca – 2022–24
- **Petar Ratkov** – **Levante** – 2026–
- Mihailo Ristić – Celta – 2023–26
- Antonio Rukavina – Valladolid, Villarreal – 2012–18
- Ivan Šaponjić – Atlético Madrid, Cádiz – 2019–21
- Goran Šaula – Compostela – 1996–98 – (Federal Republic of Yugoslavia) while active.
- Dušan Savić – Sporting – 1982–83 – (Socialist Federal Republic of Yugoslavia) while active.
- Stefan Šćepović – Getafe – 2015–16
- Aleksandar Sedlar – Mallorca, Alavés – 2019–20, 21–22, 23–25
- Milan Smiljanić – Espanyol, Sporting – 2007–10
- Predrag Spasić – Real Madrid, Osasuna – 1990–94 – (Socialist Federal Republic of Yugoslavia) – (Federal Republic of Yugoslavia) while active.
- Jovan Stanković – Mallorca, Atlético Madrid – 1997–01, 02–04 – (Serbia and Montenegro) while active.
- Predrag Stanković – Hércules – 1996–97 – (Federal Republic of Yugoslavia) while active.
- Milan Stepanov – Málaga – 2009–10
- Goran Stevanović – Osasuna – 1991–93 – (Socialist Federal Republic of Yugoslavia) – (Federal Republic of Yugoslavia) while active.
- Zoran Stojadinović – Mallorca, Deportivo – 1989–90, 91–92 – (Socialist Federal Republic of Yugoslavia) – (Federal Republic of Yugoslavia) while active.
- Vlada Stošić – Mallorca, Betis – 1991–92, 94–96 – (Socialist Federal Republic of Yugoslavia) – (Federal Republic of Yugoslavia) while active.
- Vladimir Stojković – Getafe – 2008–09
- Igor Taševski – Villarreal – 1998–99, 00–01 – (Federal Republic of Yugoslavia) while active.
- Đorđe Tomić – Atlético Madrid, Oviedo – 1996–97, 00–01 – (Federal Republic of Yugoslavia) while active.
- Ivan Tomić – Alavés – 2000–01, 02–03 – (Federal Republic of Yugoslavia) while active.
- Duško Tošić – Betis – 2011–12
- Petar Vasiljević – Albacete – 1995–96 – (Federal Republic of Yugoslavia) while active.
- Vladimir Vermezović – Sporting – 1989–90 – (Socialist Federal Republic of Yugoslavia) while active.
- Risto Vidaković – Betis, Osasuna – 1994–01 – (Federal Republic of Yugoslavia) while active.
- Josip Višnjić – Rayo, Hércules – 1992–94, 96–97 – (Federal Republic of Yugoslavia) while active.
- Miroslav Vojinović – Cádiz – 1983–84 – (Socialist Federal Republic of Yugoslavia) while active.
- Nikola Žigić – Racing, Valencia – 2006–10

=== Slovakia ===
- Peter Dubovský – Real Madrid, Oviedo – 1993–00
- Dušan Galis – Cádiz – 1981–82 – (Czechoslovakia) while active.
- Dominik Greif – Mallorca – 2021–25
- **Dávid Hancko** – **Atlético Madrid** – 2025–
- Miroslav Karhan – Betis – 1999–00
- Marián Kelemen – Numancia – 2008–09
- Branislav Kubala – Espanyol – 1964–65 – (Czechoslovakia) while active.
- Stanislav Lobotka – Celta – 2017–20
- Milan Luhový – Sporting – 1989–92 – (Czechoslovakia) while active.
- Róbert Mazáň – Celta – 2017–19
- Tibor Mičinec – Logroñés – 1991–92 – (Czechoslovakia) while active.
- Ján Pivarník – Cádiz – 1981–82 – (Czechoslovakia) while active.
- Samuel Slovák – Tenerife – 1997–99, 01–02
- Martin Valjent – Mallorca – 2019–20, 21–26
- Denis Vavro – Huesca – 2020–21
- Vladimír Weiss – Espanyol – 2011–12

=== Slovenia ===
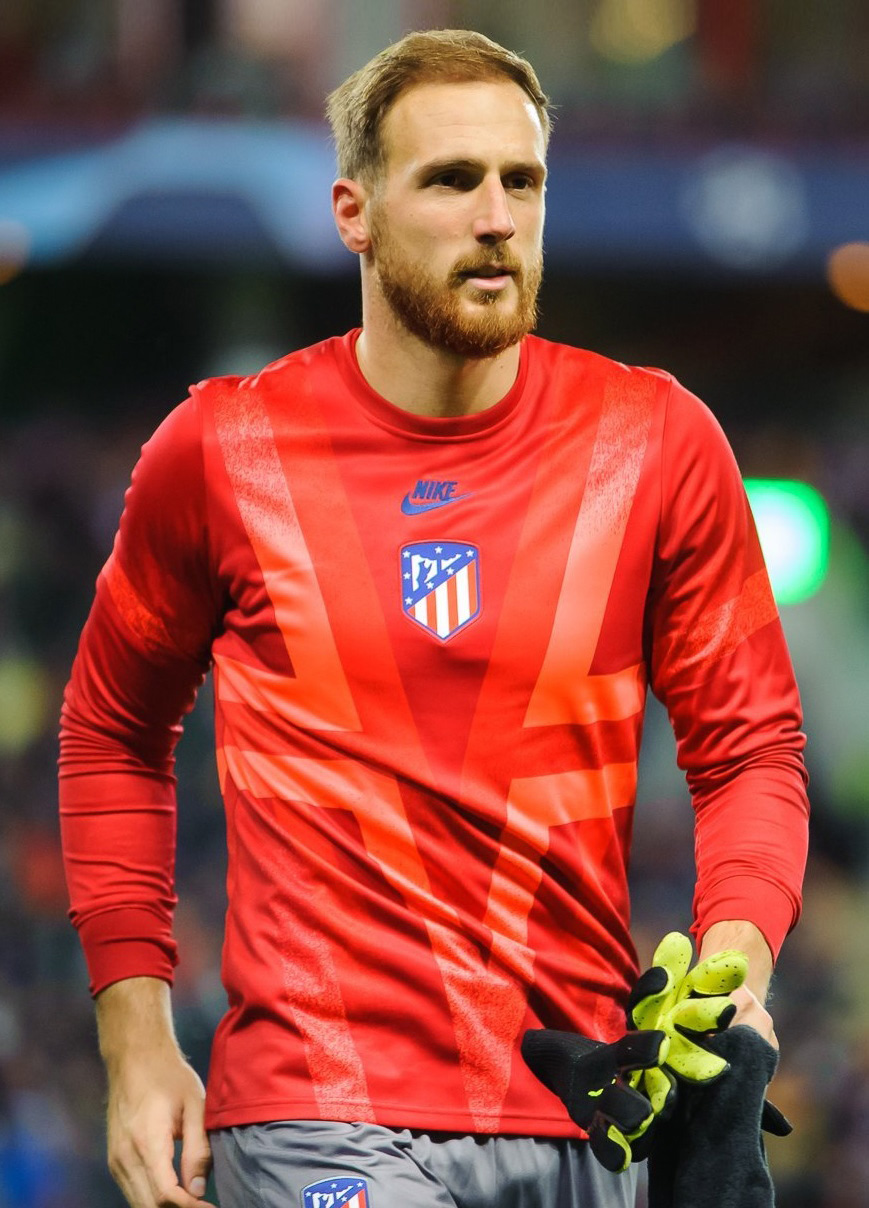
Jan Oblak with Atlético Madrid in 2019

- **Vanja Drkušić** – **Espanyol** – 2026–
- Branko Ilić – Betis – 2006–09
- Bojan Jokić – Villarreal – 2013–16
- Rene Krhin – Córdoba, Granada – 2014–17
- **Jan Oblak** – **Atlético Madrid** – 2014–
- Dalibor Stevanovič – Real Sociedad – 2005–07
- Zlatko Zahovič – Valencia – 2000–01

=== Sweden ===
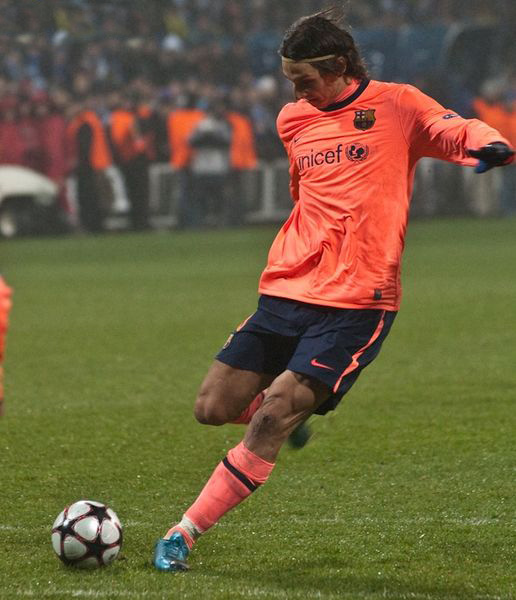
Zlatan Ibrahimović taking a free kick for Barcelona in 2009

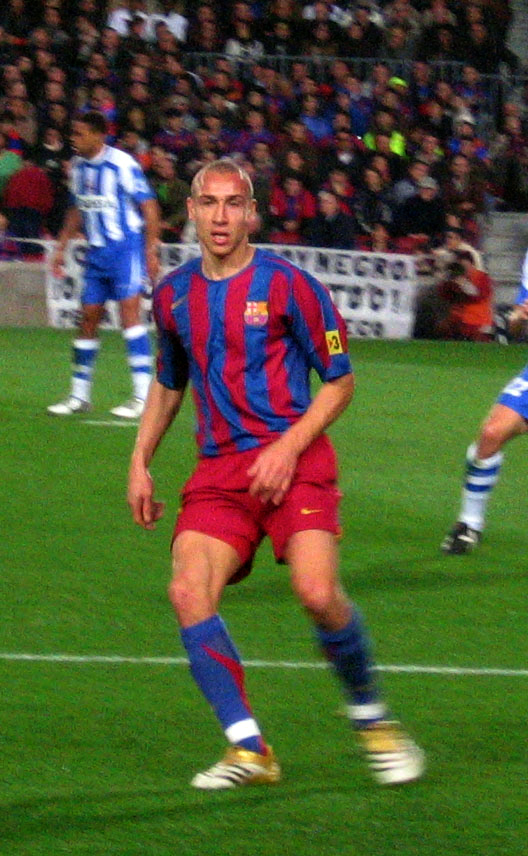
Henrik Larsson playing for Barcelona in 2006

- Bengt Andersson – Tenerife – 1996–98
- Patrik Andersson – Barcelona – 2001–04
- Sanny Åslund – Espanyol – 1974–75
- Mattias Asper – Real Sociedad – 2000–01
- Ludwig Augustinsson – Sevilla, Mallorca – 2021–22, 22–23
- Kennedy Bakircioglu – Racing – 2010–12
- **Roony Bardghji** – **Barcelona** – 2025–
- Joachim Björklund – Valencia – 1998–01
- **Jens Cajuste** – **Málaga** – 2026–
- Henry Carlsson – Atlético Madrid – 1949–53
- **Simon Eriksson** – **Racing** – 2026–
- Tobias Grahn – Gimnàstic – 2006–07
- John Guidetti – Celta, Alavés – 2015–20, 20–22
- Zlatan Ibrahimović – Barcelona – 2009–10
- Alexander Isak – Real Sociedad – 2019–23
- Daniel Larsson – Valladolid, Granada – 2012–15
- Henrik Larsson – Barcelona – 2004–06
- Olof Mellberg – Racing – 1998–01
- Håkan Mild – Real Sociedad – 1996–98
- Johan Mjällby – Levante – 2004–05
- Guillermo Molins – Betis – 2012–13
- Joakim Nilsson – Sporting – 1990–93
- Markus Rosenberg – Racing – 2010–11
- Stefan Schwarz – Valencia – 1998–99
- Agne Simonsson – Real Madrid, Real Sociedad – 1960–62
- **Carl Starfelt** – **Celta** – 2023–
- Kari Juhani "Gary" Sundgren – Zaragoza – 1997–02
- **Williot Swedberg** – **Celta** – 2022–
- Christian Wilhelmsson – Deportivo – 2007–08

=== Switzerland ===
- Fabio Celestini – Levante, Getafe – 2004–10
- Fabio Coltorti – Racing – 2007–11
- Eray Cömert – Valencia, Valladolid – 2021–23, 24–26
- Antonio Esposito – Extremadura – 1998–99
- Xavier Margairaz – Osasuna – 2007–08
- Patrick Müller – Mallorca – 2004–05
- Alain Nef – Recreativo – 2008–09
- Miguel Retuerto – Barcelona – 1984–85
- Ricardo Rodriguez – Betis – 2024–26
- Fabian Schär – Deportivo – 2017–18
- Haris Seferovic – Real Sociedad, Celta – 2013–14, 22–23
- Philippe Senderos – Valencia – 2013–14
- Djibril Sow – Sevilla – 2023–26
- **Filip Ugrinić** – **Valencia** – 2025–
- **Rubén Vargas** – **Sevilla** – 2024–
- Johann Vogel – Betis – 2006–07

=== Turkey ===
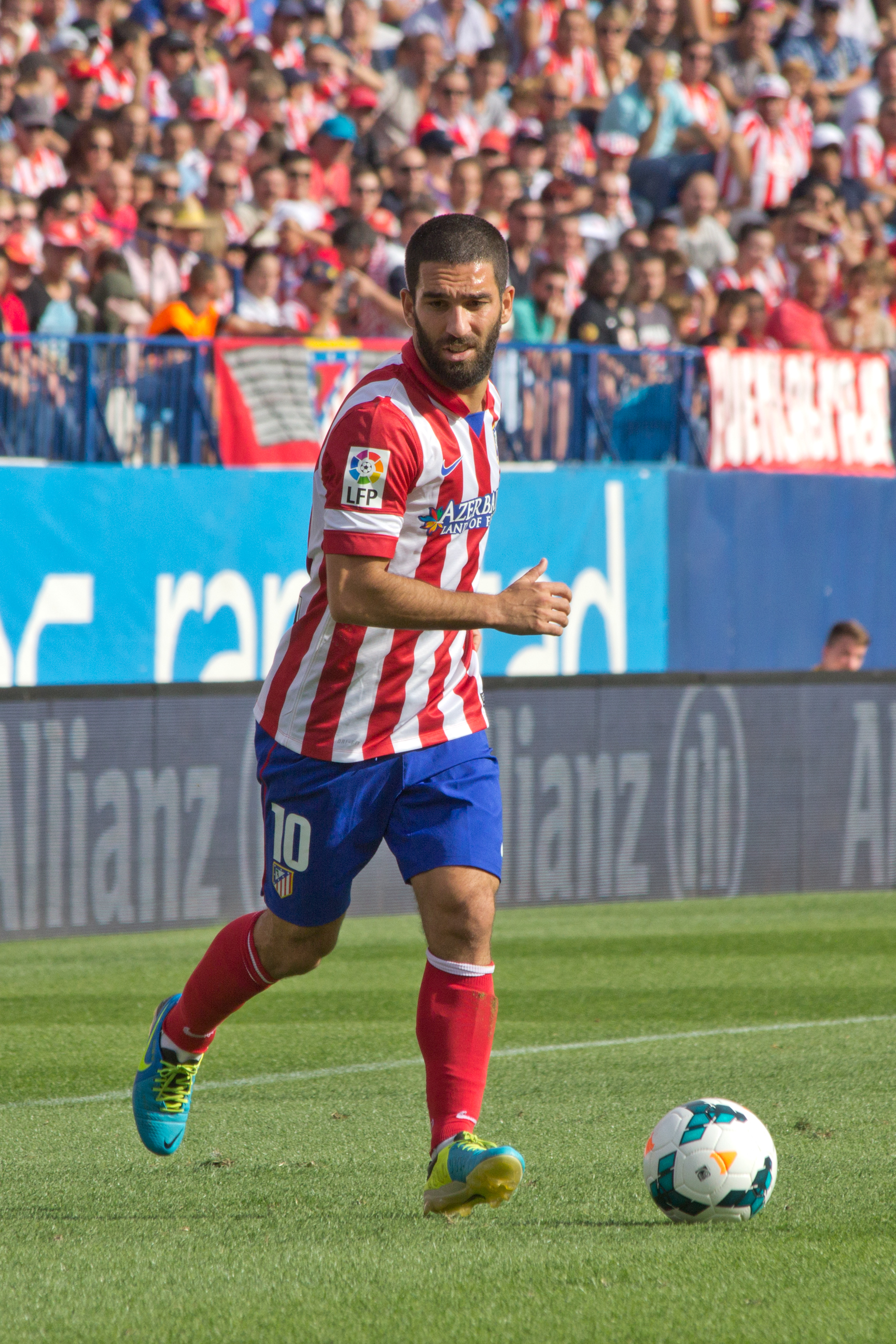
Arda Turan playing for Atlético Madrid in 2013

- Hamit Altıntop – Real Madrid – 2011–12
- **Altay Bayındır** – **Celta** – 2026–
- Emre Belözoğlu – Atlético Madrid – 2012–13
- Emre Çolak – Deportivo – 2016–18
- Oktay Derelioğlu – Las Palmas – 2000–01
- Arif Erdem – Real Sociedad – 2000–01
- **Arda Güler** – **Real Madrid** – 2023–
- Serdar Gürler – Huesca – 2018–19
- Nihat Kahveci – Real Sociedad, Villarreal – 2001–09
- İbrahim Kaş – Getafe – 2008–09
- Tayfun Korkut – Real Sociedad, Espanyol – 2000–04
- İsmail Köybaşı – Granada – 2019–20
- Ersen Martin – Recreativo – 2007–09
- Mehmet Aurélio – Betis – 2008–09
- Emre Mor – Celta – 2017–19, 20–21
- Cenk Özkacar – Valencia, Valladolid – 2022–25
- Rüştü Reçber – Barcelona – 2003–04
- Nuri Şahin – Real Madrid – 2011–12
- Çağlar Söyüncü – Atlético Madrid – 2023–24
- Mehmet Topal – Valencia – 2010–12
- Arda Turan – Atlético Madrid, Barcelona – 2011–17
- **Enes Ünal** – Villarreal, Levante, Valladolid, **Getafe** – 2017–24, 26–
- Naci Ünüvar – Espanyol – 2024–25
- Bertuğ Yıldırım – Getafe – 2024–25
- Okay Yokuşlu – Celta, Getafe – 2018–21, 21–22

=== Ukraine ===
- Denys Boyko – Málaga – 2016–17
- Dmytro Chyhrynskyi – Barcelona – 2009–10
- Artem Dovbyk – Girona – 2023–24
- Yevhen Konoplyanka – Sevilla – 2015–16
- Maksym Koval – Deportivo – 2017–18
- Vladyslav Krapyvtsov – Girona – 2024–26
- Artem Kravets – Granada – 2016–17
- Vasyl Kravets – Leganés – 2018–19
- **Andriy Lunin** – Leganés, **Real Madrid** – 2018–19, 21–
- Serhiy Pogodin – Mérida – 1995–96
- Vasyl Rats – Espanyol – 1988–89 – (Soviet Union) while active.
- Viktor Tsygankov – Girona – 2022–26
- Vladyslav Vanat – Girona – 2025–26
- Roman Yaremchuk – Valencia – 2023–24
- Roman Zozulya – Betis – 2016–17

=== Wales ===
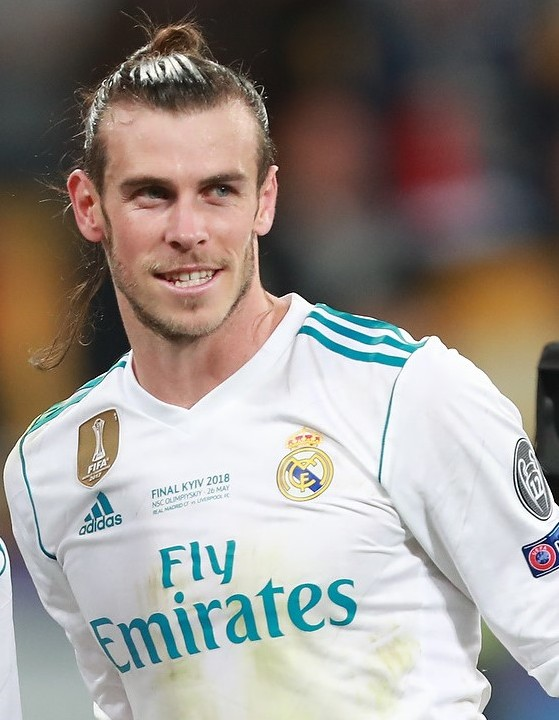
Gareth Bale with Real Madrid in 2018

- Gareth Bale – Real Madrid – 2013–20, 21–22
- George Green – Espanyol – 1935–36
- Mark Hughes – Barcelona – 1986–87

== North and Central America, Caribbean (CONCACAF) ==
=== Canada ===
- **Tajon Buchanan** – **Villarreal** – 2024–
- Theo Corbeanu – Granada – 2023–24
- **Jonathan David** – **Atlético Madrid** – 2026–
- Julian de Guzman – Deportivo – 2005–09
- Cyle Larin – Valladolid, Mallorca – 2022–25
- **Tani Oluwaseyi** – **Villarreal** – 2025–
- **Nathan Saliba** – **Villarreal** – 2026–
- Justin Smith – Espanyol – 2024–25

=== Costa Rica ===
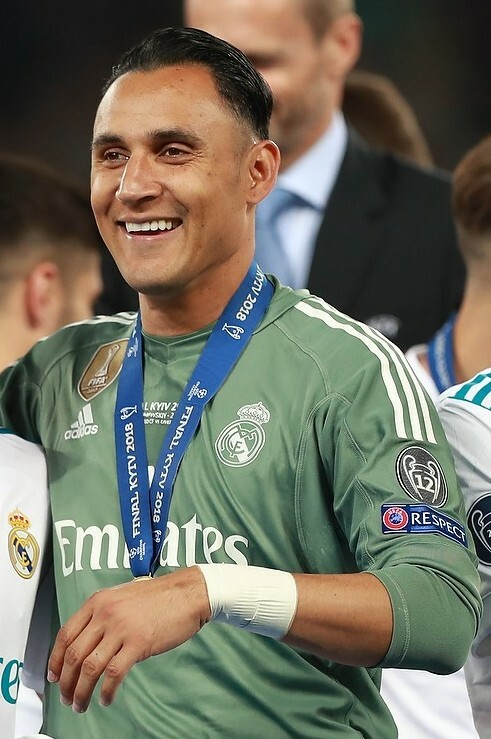
Keylor Navas with Real Madrid in 2018

- Celso Borges – Deportivo – 2014–18
- Joel Campbell – Betis, Villarreal – 2012–13, 14–15, 17–18
- Luis Gabelo Conejo – Albacete – 1991–92, 93–94
- Óscar Duarte – Espanyol, Levante – 2015–22
- Rónald Gómez – Sporting – 1996–97
- Carlos Martín Segura – Murcia – 1963–64
- Alejandro Morera – Barcelona, Hércules – 1933–36
- Keylor Navas – Levante, Real Madrid – 2011–19
- José Quesada – Espanyol – 1934–36
- Paulo Wanchope – Málaga – 2004–05

=== Cuba ===
- Mario Inchausti – Zaragoza – 1939–40
- Benito Miró – Espanyol – 1932–33
- Juan Muntaner – Barcelona, Deportivo – 1939–40, 41–45

=== Dominican Republic ===
- Heinz Barmettler – Valladolid – 2013–14
- Tano Bonnín – Osasuna – 2016–17
- **Mariano Díaz** – Real Madrid, Sevilla, **Alavés** – 2016–17, 18–24, 25–
- **Junior Firpo** – **Betis**, Barcelona – 2017–21, 25–
- Peter González – Real Madrid, Valencia, Getafe – 2021–22, 23–25

=== El Salvador ===
- Jorge Alberto "Mágico" González – Cádiz, Valladolid – 1983–85, 86–91
- Ricardo Saprissa – Espanyol – 1928–32

=== Guadeloupe ===
- Jocelyn Angloma – Valencia – 1997–02
- Claudio Beauvue – Celta, Leganés – 2015–18
- **Dimitri Foulquier** – Granada, Getafe, **Valencia** – 2013–17, 18–19, 19–

=== Haiti ===
- Frantz Bertin – Racing – 2004–05
- Yves Desmarets – Deportivo – 2010–11

=== Honduras ===
- Kervin Arriaga – Levante – 2025–26
- Julio César Arzú – Racing – 1982–83
- José Cardona – Elche, Atlético Madrid – 1959–60, 61–69
- Allan Costly – Málaga – 1982–83
- José Roberto Figueroa – Murcia – 1983–85
- Amado Guevara – Valladolid – 1995–96
- Anthony Lozano – Girona, Cádiz, Getafe, Almería – 2017–19, 20–24
- Carlos Pavón – Valladolid – 1995–96
- Carlos Suazo – Elche – 1959–60
- Gilberto Yearwood – Elche, Valladolid – 1977–78, 80–83

=== Martinique ===
Note: Martinique is a French overseas department which is a member of CONCACAF but it is not recognized by FIFA. Players listed here are French citizens who have played for the Martinique national team. They are eligible to play for the France national team. Players with the note "Born in France" were not born in Martinique, despite being a part of France.

- Grégory Arnolin – Sporting – 2009–12
- Jean-Sylvain Babin – Granada, Sporting – 2014–17
- Julien Faubert – Real Madrid – 2008–09
- Mickaël Malsa – Levante, Valladolid – 2020–23
- Florent Poulolo – Getafe – 2019–20
- Emmanuel Rivière – Osasuna – 2016–17
- Olivier Thomert – Hércules – 2010–11

=== Mexico ===
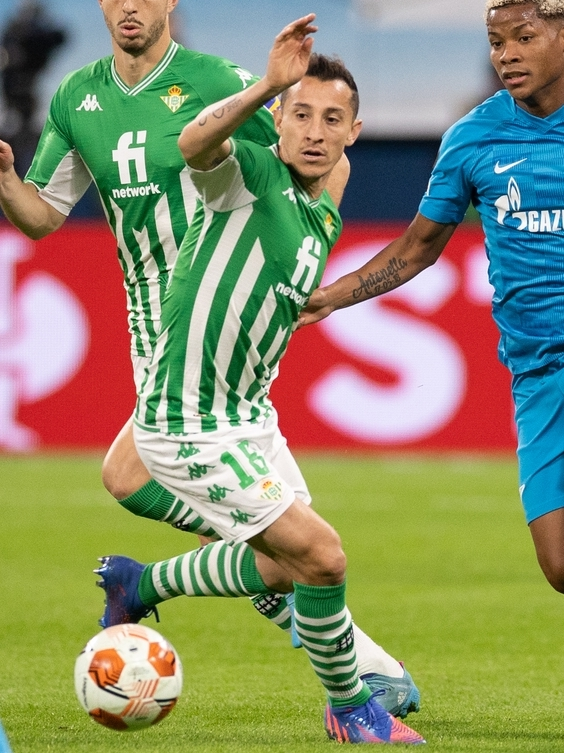
Andrés Guardado playing for Real Betis in 2022

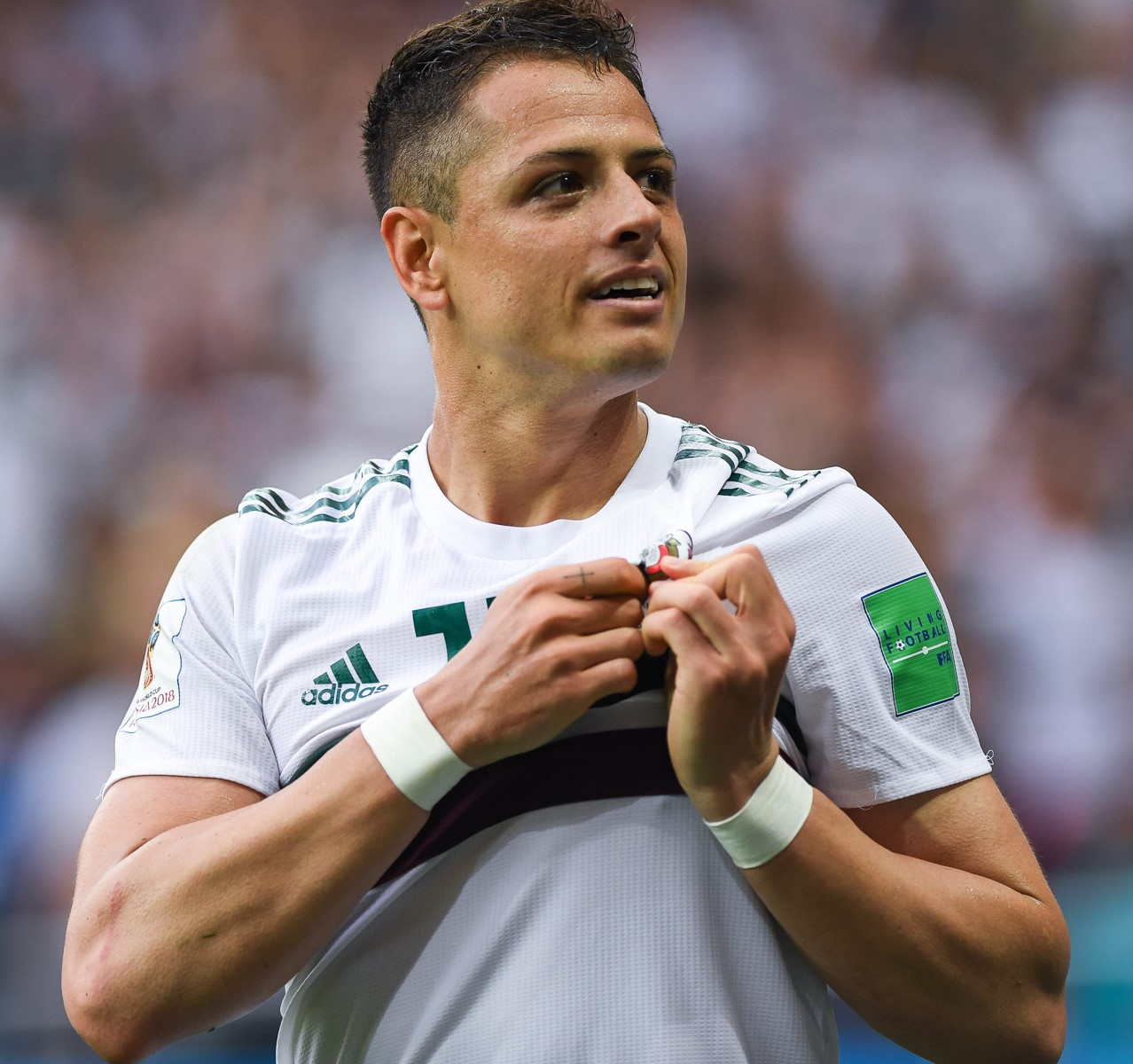
Javier Hernández in 2018

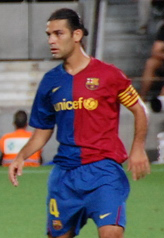
Rafael Márquez in action for Barcelona in 2009

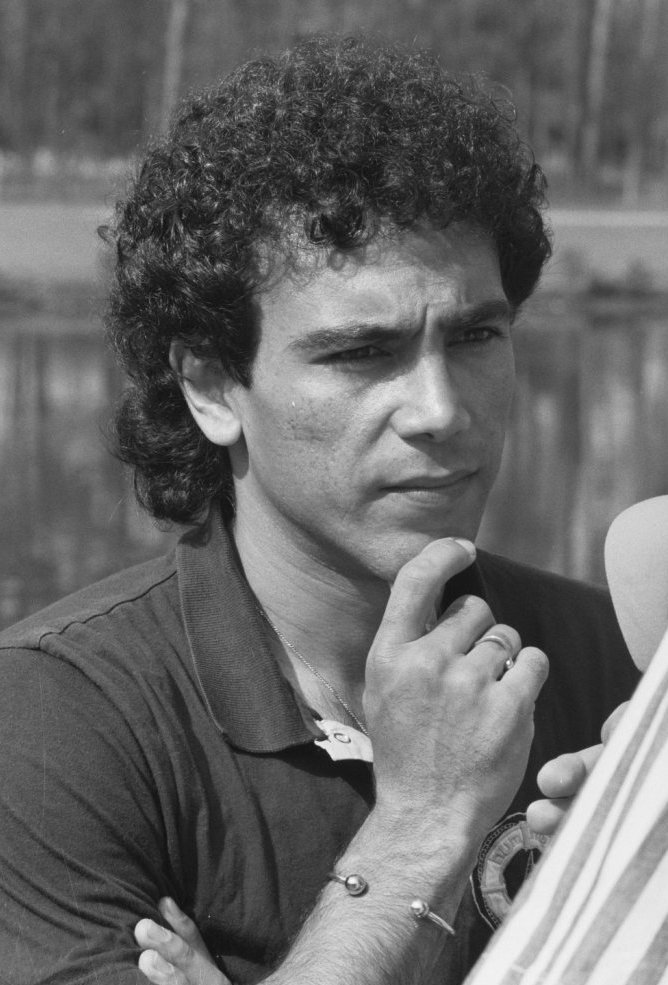
Hugo Sánchez in 1988

- Javier Aguirre – Osasuna – 1986–87
- Manuel Alonso – Racing – 1934–35
- Javier Aquino – Villarreal, Rayo – 2013–15
- Julián Araujo – Las Palmas – 2023–24
- Néstor Araujo – Celta – 2018–22
- Pablo Barrera – Zaragoza – 2011–12
- Cuauhtémoc Blanco – Valladolid – 2000–02
- José Luis Borbolla – Deportivo, Real Madrid, Celta – 1944–47
- Omar Bravo – Deportivo – 2008–09
- Nery Castillo – Rayo – 2013–14
- Jesús Manuel Corona – Sevilla – 2021–24
- Francisco Javier Cruz – Logroñés – 1988–89
- Luís de la Fuente – Racing – 1934–35
- José Manuel de la Torre – Oviedo – 1988–89
- Antonio de Nigris – Villarreal – 2002–03
- Giovani dos Santos – Barcelona, Racing, Mallorca, Villarreal – 2007–08, 10–11, 12–15
- Jonathan dos Santos – Barcelona, Villarreal – 2009–17
- **Álvaro Fidalgo** – **Betis** – 2025–
- Luis Flores – Sporting, Valencia – 1986–87, 88–89
- Guillermo Franco – Villarreal – 2005–10
- Luis García – Atlético Madrid, Real Sociedad – 1992–95
- Andrés Guardado – Deportivo, Valencia, Betis – 2007–11, 12–14, 17–24
- Javier "Chicharito" Hernández – Real Madrid, Sevilla – 2014–15, 19–20
- Héctor Herrera – Atlético Madrid – 2019–22
- Javier Iturriaga – Athletic Bilbao – 2006–07
- Raúl Jiménez – Atlético Madrid – 2014–15
- Efraín Juárez – Zaragoza – 2011–12
- Diego Lainez – Betis – 2018–22
- Carlos Laviada – Oviedo – 1934–36
- Miguel Layún – Sevilla, Villarreal – 2017–19
- José Juan Macías – Getafe – 2021–22
- Rafael Márquez – Barcelona – 2003–10
- César Montes – Espanyol, Almería – 2022–24
- Héctor Moreno – Espanyol, Real Sociedad – 2011–15, 17–19
- Manuel Negrete – Sporting – 1986–87
- Carlos Ochoa – Osasuna – 2002–03
- Guillermo Ochoa – Málaga, Granada – 2014–17
- **Álex Padilla** – **Athletic Bilbao** – 2024–25, 25–
- Francisco Palencia – Espanyol – 2001–02
- Orbelín Pineda – Celta – 2021–22
- Diego Reyes – Real Sociedad, Espanyol, Leganés – 2015–17, 18–19
- Hugo Sánchez – Atlético Madrid, Real Madrid, Rayo – 1981–92, 93–94
- José Ramón Sauto – Real Madrid – 1933–36, 39–44
- Juan Ángel Seguro – Osasuna – 2003–04
- Gerardo Torrado – Sevilla, Racing – 2002–05
- **Obed Vargas** – **Atlético Madrid** – 2025–
- Carlos Vela – Osasuna, Real Sociedad – 2007–08, 11–18
- Manuel Vidrio – Osasuna – 2002–03
- Germán Villa – Espanyol – 1998–99

=== Panama ===
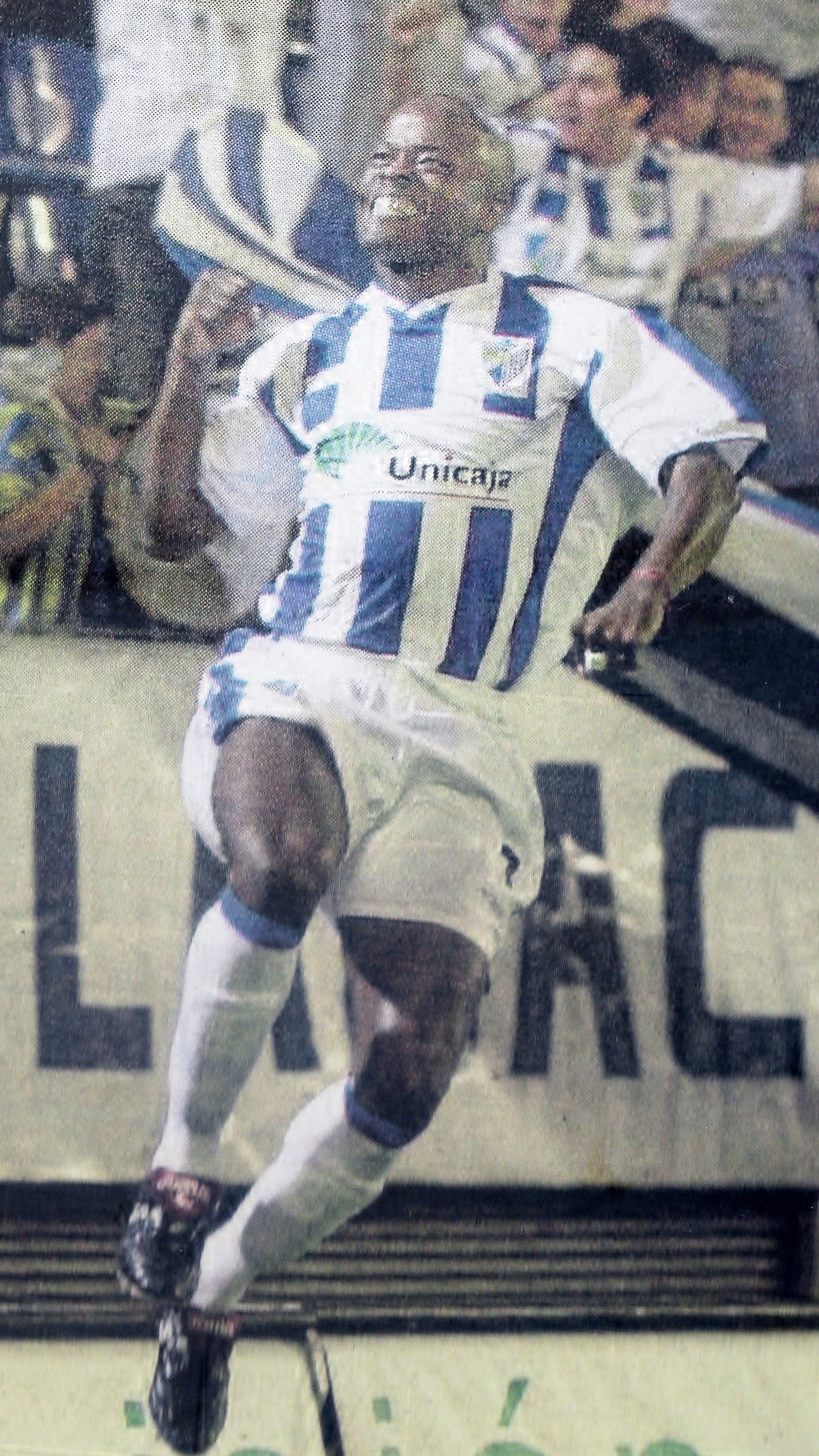
Julio Dely Valdés playing for Málaga in 2002

- Roberto Chen – Málaga – 2013–14
- Julio Dely Valdés – Oviedo, Málaga – 1997–03
- Rommel Fernández – Tenerife, Valencia, Albacete – 1989–93
- José Luis Rodríguez – Alavés – 2019–20

=== Puerto Rico ===
- Leandro Antonetti – Sevilla – 2024–25
- Eduardo Ordóñez – Atlético Madrid, Real Madrid – 1928–30, 32–33, 34–35

=== Suriname ===
- Sheraldo Becker – Real Sociedad, Osasuna – 2023–26
- Ryan Donk – Betis – 2016–17
- Romano Sion – Compostela – 1997–98

=== United States of America ===
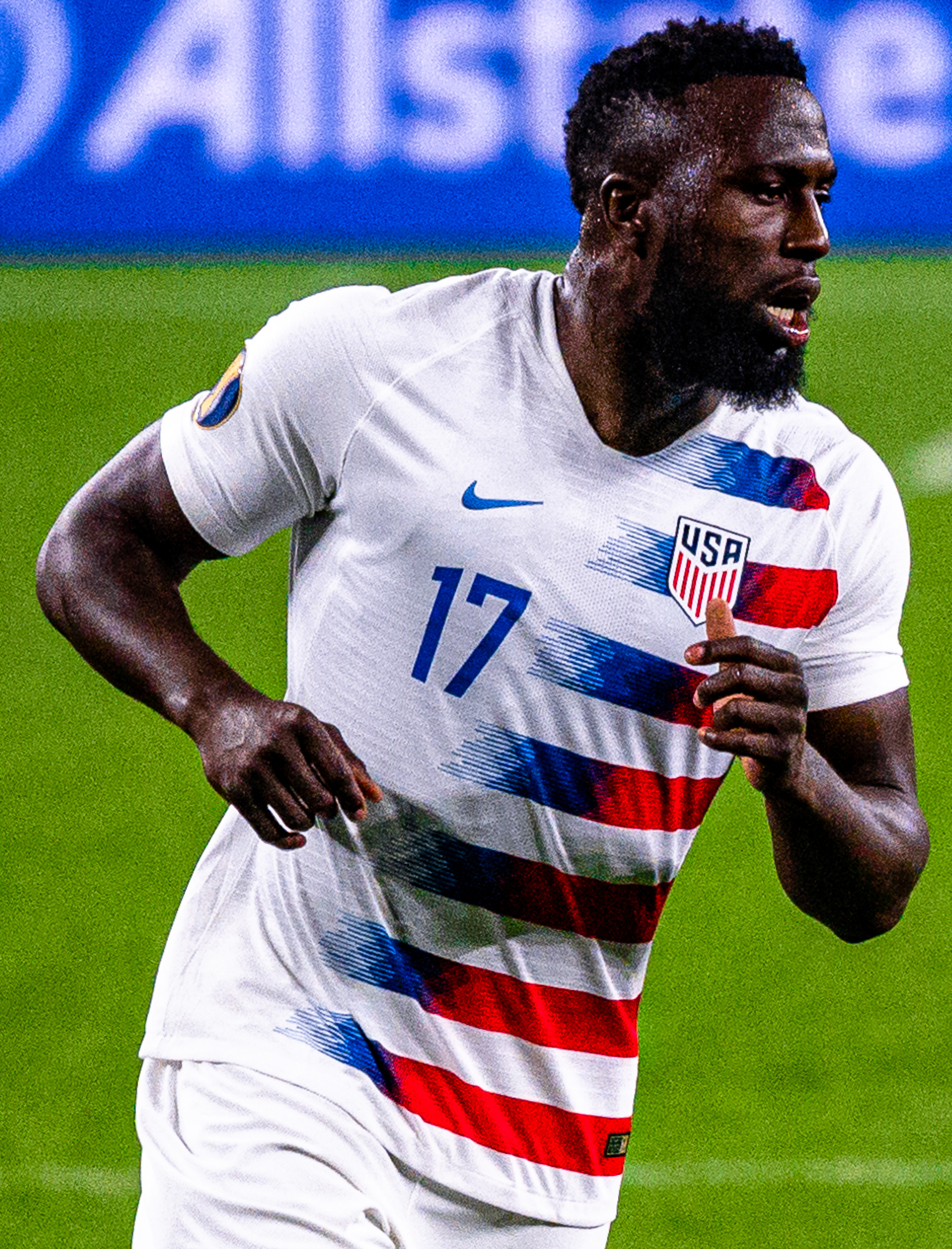
Jozy Altidore in 2019

- Jozy Altidore – Villarreal – 2008–09, 10–11
- **Johnny Cardoso** – Betis, **Atlético Madrid** – 2023–
- Luca de la Torre – Celta – 2022–25
- Sergiño Dest – Barcelona – 2020–22
- **Alex Freeman** – **Villarreal** – 2025–
- Matthew Hoppe – Mallorca – 2021–22
- Kasey Keller – Rayo – 1999–01
- Matt Miazga – Alavés – 2021–22
- Shaquell Moore – Levante – 2017–18
- Yunus Musah – Valencia – 2020–23
- Oguchi Onyewu – Málaga – 2012–13

== South America (CONMEBOL) ==
=== Bolivia ===
- Marco Etcheverry – Albacete – 1991–92
- Juan Manuel Peña – Valladolid, Villarreal – 1995–07
- Marco Sandy – Valladolid – 1995–96

=== Chile ===
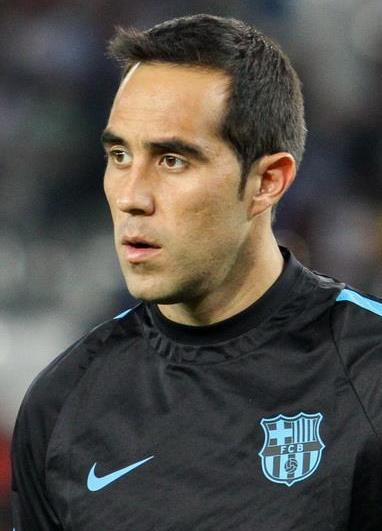
Claudio Bravo warming up for Barcelona in 2015

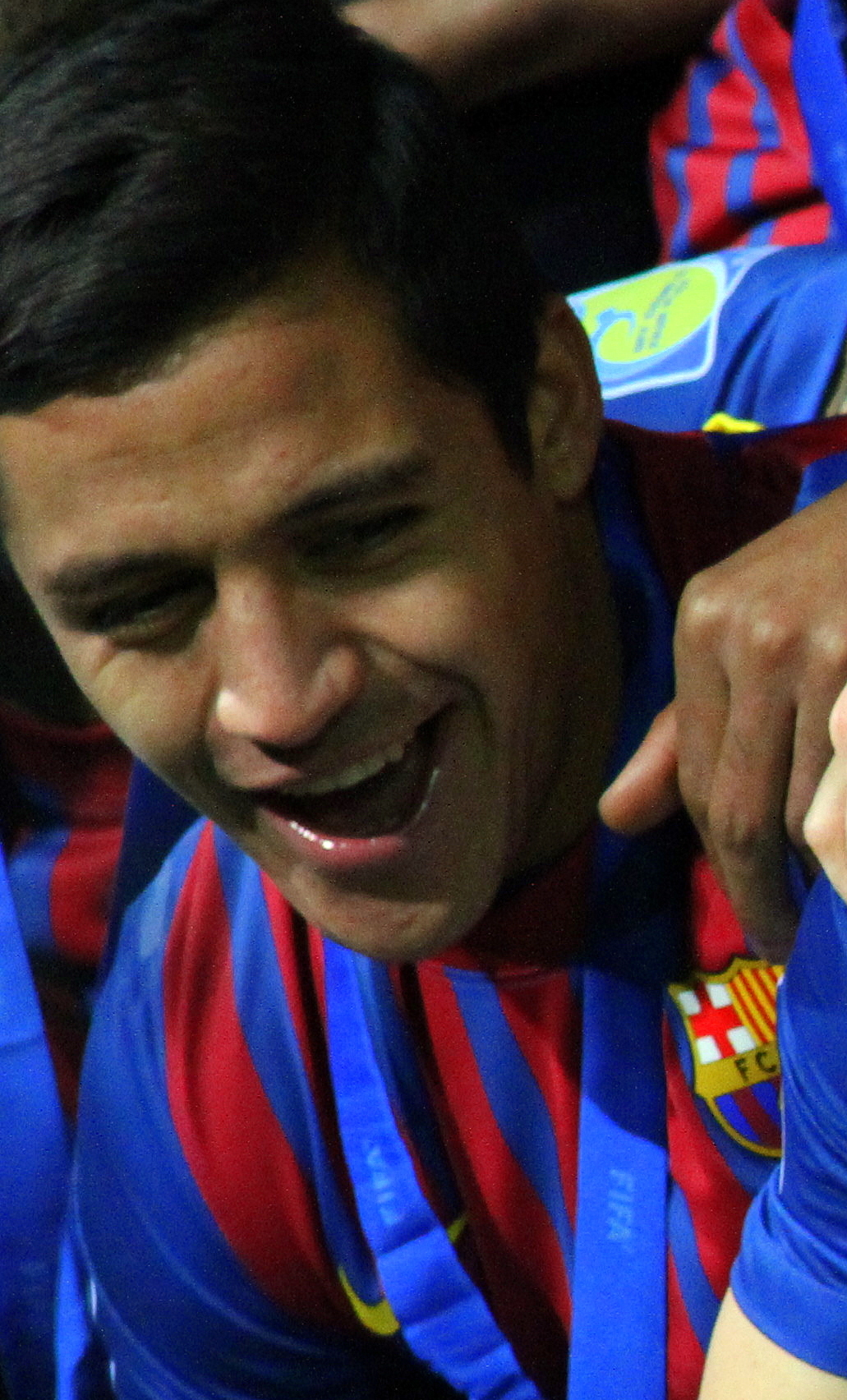
Alexis Sánchez celebrating the FIFA Club World Cup with Barcelona in 2011

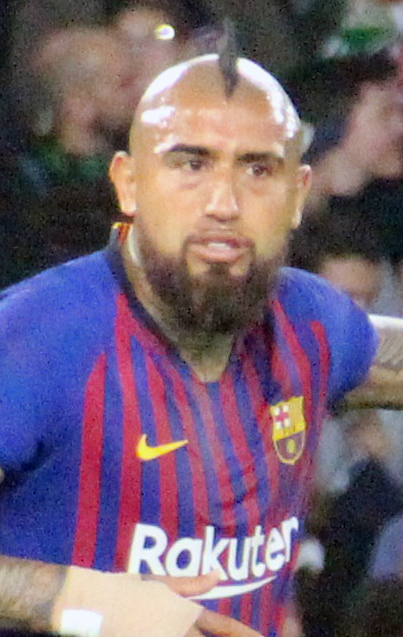
Arturo Vidal playing for Barcelona in 2019

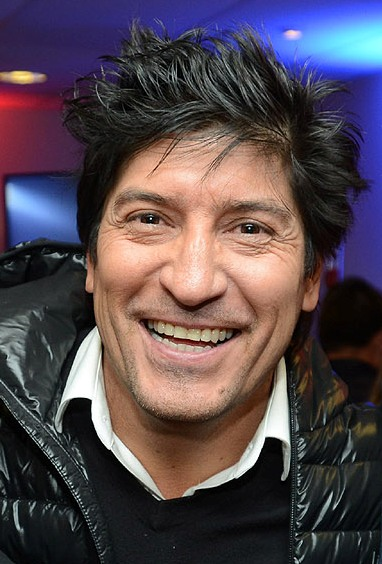
Iván Zamorano in 2013

- Tomás Alarcón – Cádiz – 2021–23
- Jorge Aravena – Valladolid – 1985–86
- Christian Bravo – Granada – 2013–14
- Claudio Bravo – Real Sociedad, Barcelona, Betis – 2006–07, 10–16, 20–24
- Ben Brereton Díaz – Villarreal – 2023–24
- Fernando Carvallo – Cádiz – 1977–78
- Carlos Caszely – Espanyol – 1975–78
- **Lucas Cepeda** – **Elche** – 2025–
- Jorge Contreras – Las Palmas – 1985–88
- Pablo Contreras – Osasuna, Celta – 2001–02, 03–04, 05–07
- Guillermo Díaz – Zaragoza – 1952–53
- Marcelo Díaz – Celta – 2015–17
- Matías Fernández – Villarreal – 2006–09
- Gabriel Galleguillos – Salamanca – 1975–77
- Mark González – Albacete, Real Sociedad, Betis – 2004–06, 07–09
- Felipe Gutiérrez – Betis – 2016–17
- Pablo Hernández – Celta – 2014–18
- Osvaldo "Arica" Hurtado – Cádiz – 1985–86
- Manuel Iturra – Málaga, Granada, Rayo, Villarreal – 2012–15, 15–16, 17–19
- Igor Lichnovsky – Sporting – 2015–16
- Guillermo Maripán – Alavés – 2017–20
- Hans Martínez – Almería – 2013–14
- Gary Medel – Sevilla – 2010–13
- Francisco Molina – Atlético Madrid – 1953–57
- Pedro Morales – Málaga – 2012–14
- Raúl Muñoz – Numancia – 1999–00
- Rafael Olarra – Osasuna – 2001–02
- Fabián Orellana – Xerez, Granada, Celta, Valencia, Eibar, Valladolid – 2009–10, 12–21
- Higinio Ortúzar – Athletic Bilbao, Valencia – 1939–47
- Mauricio Pinilla – Celta, Racing – 2003–04, 05–06
- Waldo Ponce – Racing – 2010–11
- Andrés Prieto – Espanyol – 1953–55
- Bryan Rabello – Sevilla – 2012–14
- Jaime Ramírez – Espanyol, Granada – 1952–54, 57–60, 63–64
- Miguel Ramírez – Real Sociedad – 1995–96
- Lorenzo "Lolo" Reyes – Betis – 2013–14
- Enzo Roco – Elche, Espanyol – 2014–16, 21–23
- Francisco Rojas – Tenerife – 1996–97
- Alexis Sánchez – Barcelona, Sevilla – 2011–14, 25–26
- César Santis – Espanyol – 1999–00
- Fernando Santís – Las Palmas – 1985–86
- José Luis Sierra – Valladolid – 1989–90
- Francisco Silva – Osasuna – 2012–14
- **Gabriel Suazo** – **Sevilla** – 2025–
- Humberto Suazo – Zaragoza – 2009–10
- Eduardo Vargas – Valencia – 2013–14
- Marcelo Vega – Logroñés – 1992–93
- Arturo Vidal – Barcelona – 2018–20
- Oscar Wirth – Valladolid – 1986–88
- Patricio Yáñez – Valladolid, Zaragoza, Betis – 1982–89
- Iván Zamorano – Sevilla, Real Madrid – 1990–96

=== Colombia ===
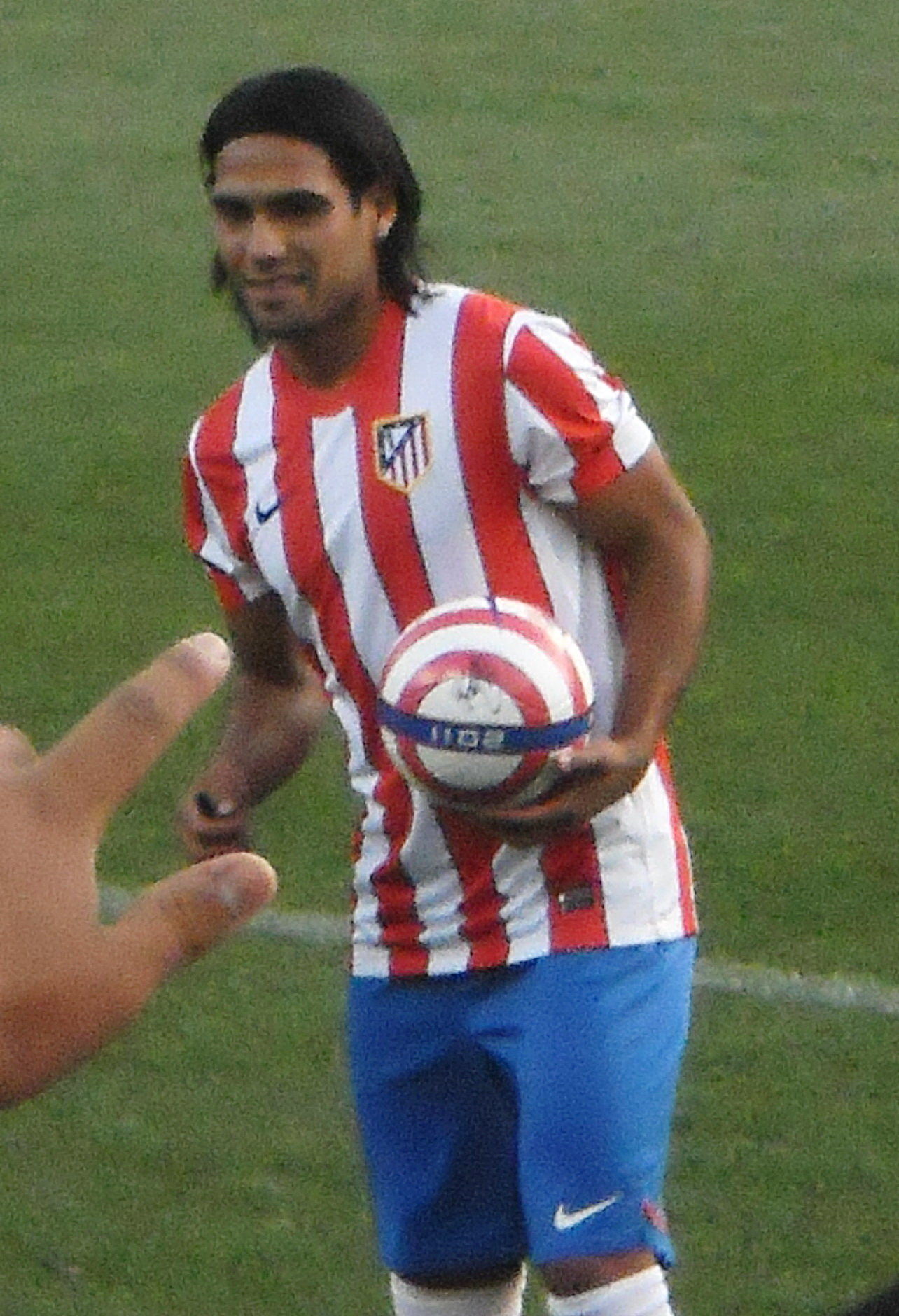
Radamel Falcao with Atlético Madrid in 2011

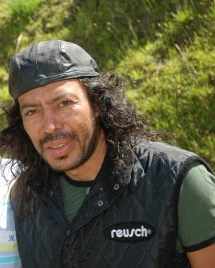
René Higuita in 2007

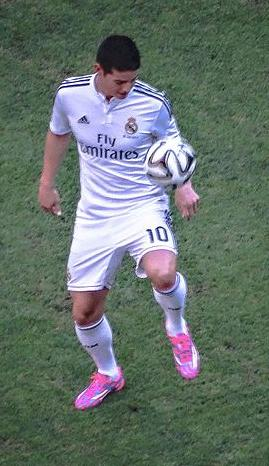
James Rodríguez with Real Madrid in 2014

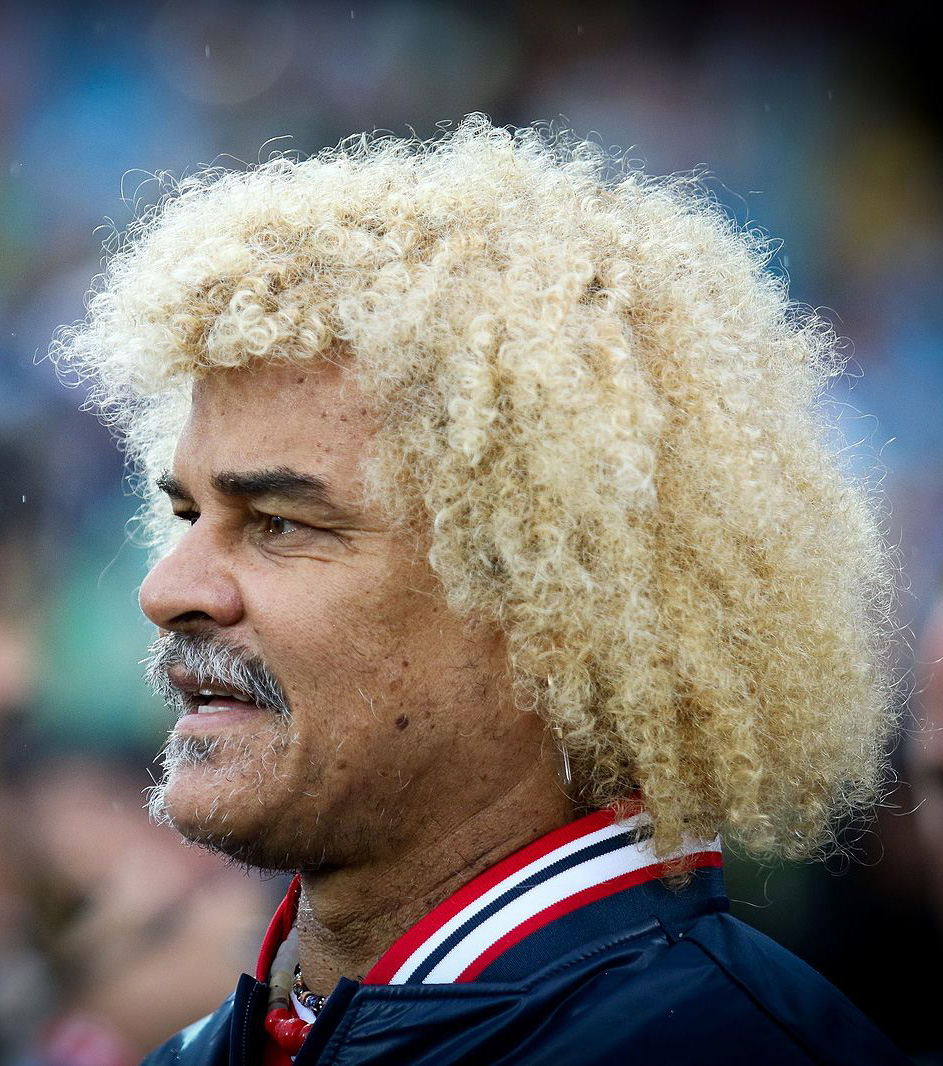
Carlos Valderrama in 2016

- Abel Aguilar – Zaragoza, Hércules, Deportivo – 2009–11, 12–13
- Leonel Álvarez – Valladolid – 1990–92
- Brayan Angulo – Granada – 2012–14
- Santiago Arias – Atlético Madrid, Granada – 2018–20, 21–22
- Víctor Aristizábal – Valencia – 1993–94
- Yáser Asprilla – Girona – 2024–26
- Carlos Bacca – Sevilla, Villarreal, Granada – 2013–15, 17–22
- Víctor Bonilla – Real Sociedad – 1999–00
- Edwin Congo – Valladolid, Real Madrid, Levante, Recreativo – 1999–00, 01–02, 04–05, 07–08
- Jhon Córdoba – Espanyol, Granada – 2013–15
- Mauricio Cuero – Levante – 2015–16
- José de la Cuesta – Cádiz – 2005–06
- **Nelson Deossa** – **Betis** – 2025–
- Bernardo Espinosa – Sevilla, Racing, Sporting, Girona, Espanyol – 2010–12, 15–16, 17–20, 22–24
- Radamel Falcao – Atlético Madrid, Rayo – 2011–13, 21–24
- Gilberto García – Valladolid – 2013–14
- Miguel Guerrero – Mérida – 1995–96
- **Juan Camilo "Cucho" Hernández** – Huesca, Mallorca, Getafe, **Betis** – 2018–21, 24–
- René Higuita – Valladolid – 1991–92
- Fredy Hinestroza – Getafe – 2014–15
- Jefferson Lerma – Levante – 2015–16, 17–18
- John Harold Lozano – Valladolid, Mallorca – 1996–03
- Jeison Lucumí – Elche – 2020–21
- Daniel Luna – Mallorca – 2024–25
- Jackson Martínez – Atlético Madrid – 2015–16
- Roger Martínez – Villarreal – 2017–18
- Yerry Mina – Barcelona – 2017–18
- **Johan Mojica** – Rayo, Girona, Elche, Villarreal, Osasuna, Mallorca, **Getafe** – 2013–14, 17–19, 20–
- Faryd Mondragón – Zaragoza – 1998–99
- Jhon Steven Mondragón – Osasuna – 2016–17
- Marlos Moreno – Deportivo, Girona – 2016–18
- Aquivaldo Mosquera – Sevilla – 2007–09
- Yerson Mosquera – Villarreal – 2023–24
- Luis Muriel – Sevilla – 2017–19
- Jeison Murillo – Granada, Valencia, Barcelona, Celta – 2013–15, 17–19, 19–22
- Juan José Narváez – Betis, Valladolid – 2017–18, 22–23
- Carlos Navarro Montoya – Extremadura, Mérida, Tenerife – 1996–99
- Humberto Osorio – Valladolid – 2013–14
- Dorlan Pabón – Betis, Valencia – 2012–13, 13–14
- Helibelton Palacios – Elche – 2020–23
- Luis Perea – Atlético Madrid – 2004–12
- Marco Pérez – Zaragoza – 2010–11
- Léider Preciado – Racing – 1998–99, 00–01
- Gustavo Puerta – Racing – 2026–27
- Adrián Ramos – Granada – 2016–17, 19–20
- Freddy Rincón – Real Madrid – 1995–96
- James Rodríguez – Real Madrid, Rayo – 2014–17, 19–20, 24–25
- Carlos Sánchez – Elche, Espanyol – 2013–14, 17–18
- Rafael Santos Borré – Villarreal – 2016–17
- Andrés Solano – Atlético Madrid – 2018–19
- Jhon Solís – Girona – 2023–26
- Luis Suárez – Granada, Almería – 2020–22, 22–24
- Daniel Torres – Alavés – 2016–19
- Albeiro Usuriaga – Málaga – 1989–90
- Carlos Valderrama – Valladolid – 1991–92
- Adolfo Valencia – Atlético Madrid – 1994–95
- Fabián Vargas – Almería – 2009–11
- Jhon Viáfara – Real Sociedad – 2005–06
- Cristián Zapata – Villarreal – 2011–12

=== Ecuador ===
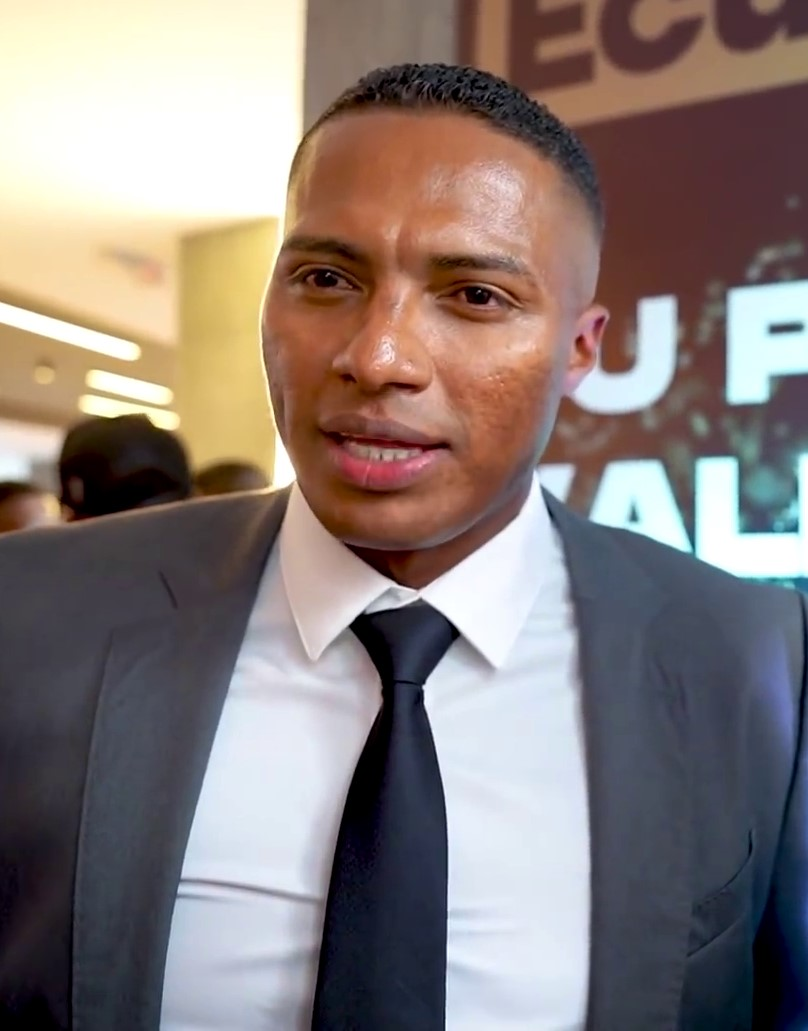
Antonio Valencia in 2022

- Felipe Caicedo – Málaga, Levante, Espanyol – 2009–11, 14–17
- Pervis Estupiñán – Granada, Osasuna, Villarreal – 2016–17, 19–22
- Joffre Guerrón – Getafe – 2008–09
- Iván Hurtado – Murcia – 2003–04
- Carlos Juárez – Murcia – 2003–04
- Iván Kaviedes – Celta, Valladolid – 1999–01, 02–03
- Jorge Larraz – Las Palmas, Granada, Tenerife, Deportivo – 1957–61, 61–62, 62–63
- Jefferson Montero – Villarreal, Levante, Betis, Getafe – 2010–12, 17–18
- Gonzalo Plata – Valladolid – 2022–23
- Stiven Plaza – Valladolid – 2018–19
- Antonio Valencia – Villarreal – 2005–06
- Joel Valencia – Zaragoza – 2011–12

=== Paraguay ===
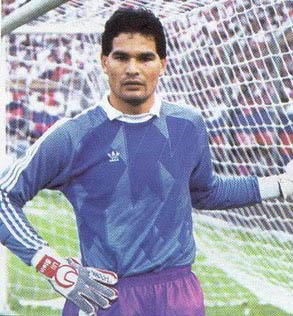
José Luis Chilavert in 1985

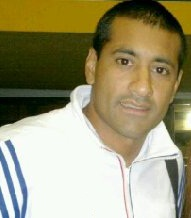
Paulo da Silva in 2011

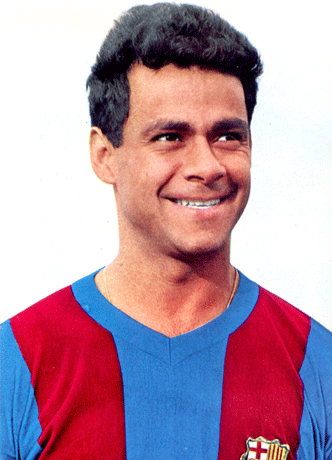
Cayetano Ré in 1960s

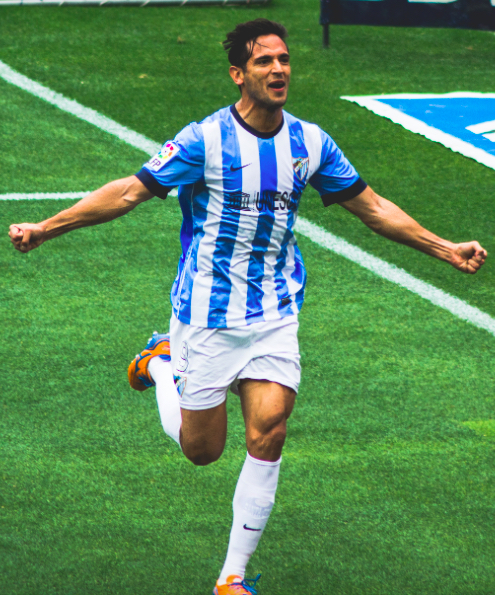
Roque Santa Cruz scoring for Málaga in 2014

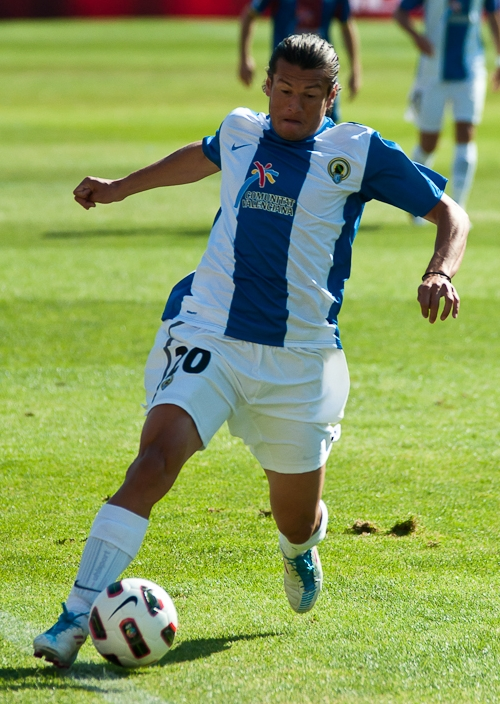
Nelson Valdez playing for Hércules in 2011

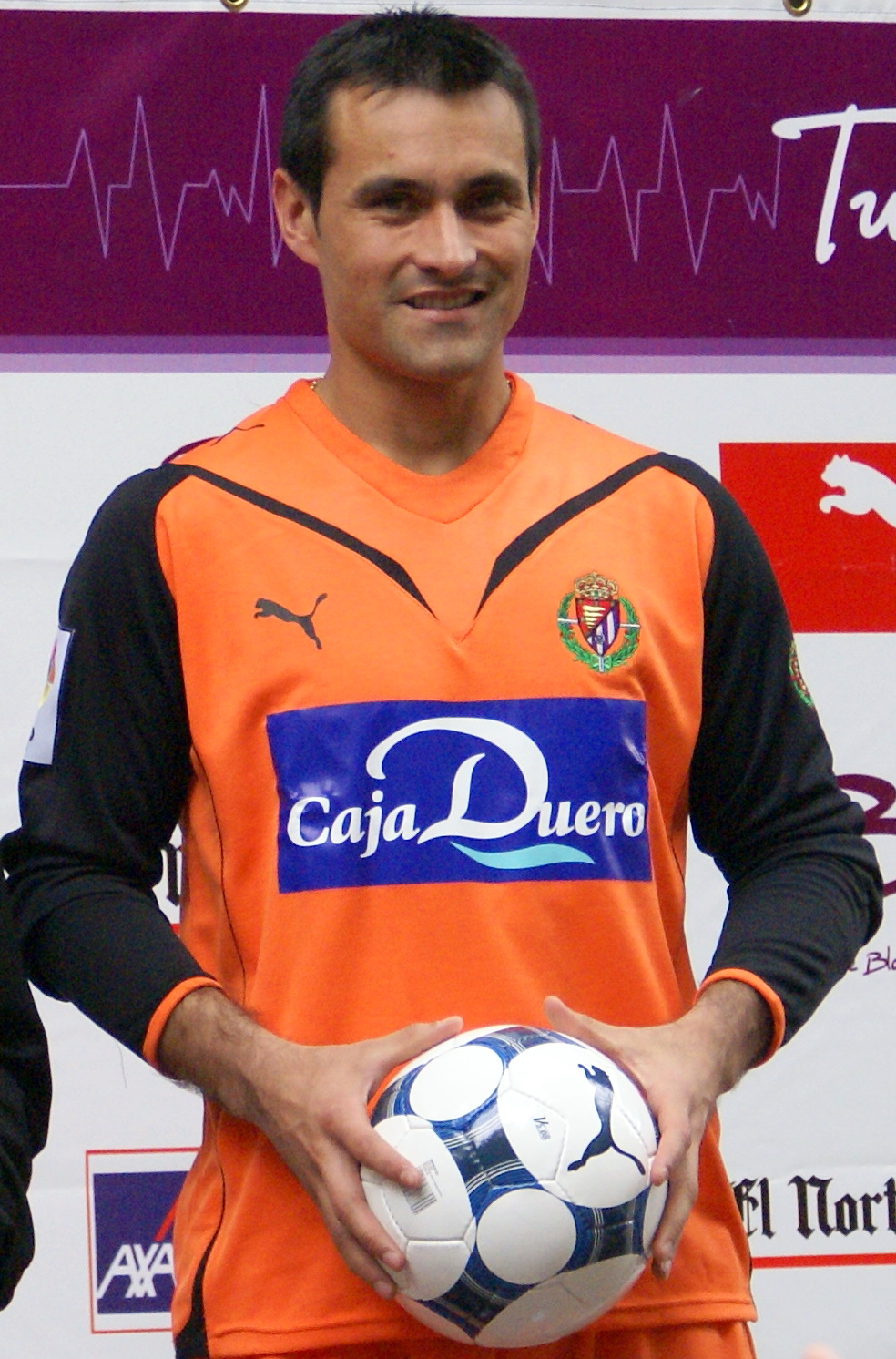
Justo Villar with Valladolid in 2009

- Ignacio Achúcarro – Sevilla – 1958–68
- Bernardo Acosta – Sevilla – 1969–72
- Javier Acuña – Osasuna – 2013–14
- Roberto Acuña – Zaragoza, Deportivo – 1997–03, 04–06
- Juan Agüero – Sevilla, Real Madrid, Granada – 1958–67
- Óscar Aguilera – Sevilla – 1958–59, 60–61
- Secundino Aifuch – Espanyol – 1978–82
- Antolín Alcaraz – Las Palmas – 2015–16
- Omar Alderete – Valencia, Getafe – 2021–25
- Júnior Alonso – Celta – 2018–19
- Florencio Amarilla – Oviedo, Elche – 1958–62
- Raúl Vicente Amarilla – Zaragoza, Barcelona – 1981–88
- Aníbal Pérez – Valencia – 1968–75
- Saturnino Arrúa – Zaragoza – 1973–77, 78–79
- Santiago Arzamendia – Cádiz – 2021–23
- Atilio – Atlético Madrid – 1953–55
- José Raúl Aveiro – Valencia, Elche – 1959–61, 63–64
- Rubén Aveiro – Atlético Madrid – 1947–48
- Celso Ayala – Betis, Atlético Madrid – 1998–00
- Carlos Báez – Salamanca, Burgos – 1977–81
- Domingo Benegas – Burgos, Atlético Madrid – 1971–79
- Epifanio Benítez – Elche – 1975–78
- Gustavo Benítez – Granada – 1975–76
- Miguel Ángel Benítez – Atlético Madrid, Espanyol – 1993–02
- Ángel Bernit – Betis – 1959–60
- Manuel Bogado – Córdoba – 1966–67
- Óscar Bravo – Oviedo – 1972–74
- Eufemio Cabral – Burgos, Valencia, Almería, Hércules – 1976–79, 80–82
- Pedro Cabral – Sevilla, Málaga – 1963–69, 70–71
- César Cabrera – Córdoba – 1963–66
- Diómedes Cabrera – Racing – 1977–78
- Amando Cáceres – Hércules, Mallorca – 1966–67, 69–70
- Julio César Cáceres – Gimnàstic – 2006–07
- Adalberto Cañete – Salamanca – 1976–77
- Juan Casco – Elche, Murcia – 1965–70, 73–75
- Benigno Chaparro – Salamanca, Racing – 1978–79, 82–83, 84–85
- José Luis Chilavert – Zaragoza – 1988–91
- Roberto Cino – Espanyol, Salamanca – 1973–74, 76–78
- Carlos Correa – Tenerife – 1961–62
- Paulo da Silva – Zaragoza – 2010–12
- Carlos Diarte – Zaragoza, Valencia, Salamanca, Betis – 1973–83
- Jorge dos Santos – Sevilla, Cádiz – 1975–77, 81–82, 83–84
- Jorge Escobar – Granada, Elche – 1973–75
- Pedro Fernández – Barcelona, Granada – 1968–76
- Roberto Fernández – Espanyol – 1976–78
- Buenaventura Ferreira – Sabadell – 1986–87
- Valeriano Ferreira – Granada – 1968–69
- Virgilio Ferreira – Extremadura – 1996–97
- Diego Figueredo – Valladolid – 2003–04
- Sebastián Fleitas – Málaga, Real Madrid – 1968–72
- Víctor Franco – Córdoba – 1967–68
- Alejandro Fretes – Racing, Atlético Madrid – 1961–62, 65–66
- Carlos Gamarra – Atlético Madrid – 1999–00
- Inocente Gaona – Deportivo – 1968–69
- Rubén Gárate – Córdoba – 1964–65
- Genaro García – Elche – 1968–70
- Néstor García – Pontevedra, Murcia – 1969–70, 73–74
- Orlando Giménez – Racing, Valencia, Espanyol, Sabadell – 1976–87
- Eduardo Gómez – Granada – 1973–74
- Hermes González – Barcelona, Oviedo – 1957–62
- Ricardo González – Elche – 1968–71, 73–76
- Heriberto Herrera – Atlético Madrid – 1953–59
- Ramón Hicks – Sabadell, Oviedo – 1986–87, 88–90
- Jorge Insfrán – Zaragoza – 1975–76
- Mario Jacquet – Burgos, Oviedo, Valladolid – 1971–74, 75–76, 80–81
- Vicente Raúl Jara – Sabadell – 1970–71
- Víctor Juárez – Granada, Murcia – 1970–72, 73–74
- Fausto Laguardia – Elche – 1959–60
- Gabriel Lezcano – Celta – 1969–75
- Juan Carlos Lezcano – Elche – 1962–71
- Óscar Lleida – Valencia – 1975–76
- Óscar López – Almería – 1979–80
- Crispín Maciel – Granada, Las Palmas – 1973–74, 75–76, 77–80
- Vidal Maciel – Murcia – 1973–74
- Adolfo Martínez – Deportivo – 1968–70
- Eulogio Martínez – Barcelona, Elche, Atlético Madrid – 1956–65
- Celso Mendieta – Betis, Zaragoza – 1974–77, 78–79
- Aníbal Montero – Elche – 1973–78
- Eulalio Mora – Cádiz – 1988–89
- Claudio Morel – Deportivo – 2010–11
- Víctor Morel – Espanyol – 1979–81
- Felipe Nery – Elche – 1984–85
- Humberto Núñez – Hércules – 1974–75, 76–78
- Felipe Ocampos – Zaragoza – 1969–71, 72–74
- Juan Ramón Ocampos – Valencia – 1975–76
- Celso Ortigosa – Cádiz – 1977–78
- Luis César Ortiz – Espanyol – 1973–78
- José Parodi – Las Palmas – 1958–60
- Silvio Parodi – Racing – 1961–62
- Abel Pérez – Murcia – 1973–75
- Hernán Pérez – Villarreal, Espanyol, Alavés – 2011–12, 13–14, 15–19
- Cayetano Ré – Elche, Barcelona, Espanyol – 1959–69, 70–71
- Carlos Riquelme – Atlético Madrid – 1953–55
- Juan Francisco Riveros – Pontevedra – 1968–70
- Juan Carlos Rojas – Córdoba – 1968–69, 71–72
- Clemente Rolón – Almería, Salamanca – 1979–81, 82–83
- Julio César Romero "Romerito" – Barcelona – 1988–89
- Francisco Romero – Espanyol, Sporting – 1967–69, 70–74
- Jorge Lino Romero – Oviedo – 1958–61
- Juan Romero – Elche – 1960–67
- Óscar Romero – Alavés – 2016–18
- Antonio "Tonny" Sanabria – Sporting, Betis – 2015–19, 20–21
- Carlos Sanabria – Valencia – 1959–60
- Roque Santa Cruz – Betis, Málaga – 2011–15, 15–16
- Delio Toledo – Espanyol, Zaragoza – 1999–01, 03–06
- Herminio Toñánez – Sevilla – 1969–72
- Nelson Valdez – Hércules, Valencia – 2010–11, 12–13
- Crispín Verza – Murcia – 1973–74
- Florencio Villalba – Real Burgos – 1992–93
- Jerónimo Villalba – Sevilla – 1975–77
- Justo Villar – Valladolid – 2008–10
- Víctor Zayas – Zaragoza – 1980–85
- Nelson Zelaya – Recreativo – 2002–03

=== Peru ===
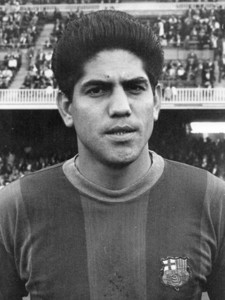
Juan Seminario with Barcelona

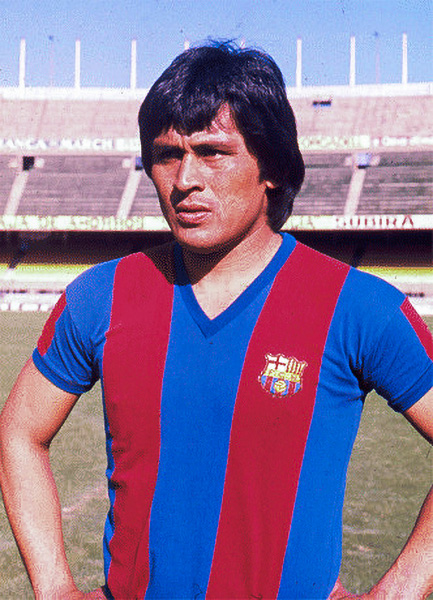
Hugo Sotil with Barcelona circa 1975

- Luis Abram – Granada – 2021–22
- Santiago Acasiete – Almería – 2007–11
- Luis Advíncula – Rayo – 2018–19
- Pedro Aicart – Málaga – 1976–77
- Juan Caballero – Elche – 1984–85
- Alexander Callens – Girona – 2022–23
- Christian Cueva – Rayo – 2013–14
- Alfonso Dulanto – Mérida – 1995–96
- Jean Ferrari – Extremadura – 1998–99
- Damián Ísmodes – Racing – 2007–08
- Juan José Jayo – Celta, Las Palmas – 2000–02
- Germán Leguía – Elche – 1984–85
- Alberto Loret de Mola – Las Palmas – 1958–60
- Flavio Maestri – Hércules – 1996–97
- Óscar Montalvo – Deportivo – 1962–63, 64–65, 66–67
- Juan Carlos Oblitas – Elche – 1975–76
- Percy Olivares – Tenerife – 1993–95
- Miguel Rebosio – Zaragoza – 2000–02, 03–04
- Luis Redher – Zaragoza – 1989–90
- Juan Seminario – Zaragoza, Barcelona, Sabadell – 1961–63, 64–69
- Sigifredo Martínez – Zaragoza, Elche – 1962–67, 67–69
- José del Solar – Tenerife, Salamanca, Celta, Valencia – 1992–98
- Hugo Sotil – Barcelona – 1973–74, 75–77
- Renato Tapia – Celta, Leganés – 2020–25
- Juan Manuel Vargas – Betis – 2015–16
- José Manuel Velásquez – Hércules – 1984–85
- Pablo Zegarra – Salamanca – 1997–99

=== Uruguay ===
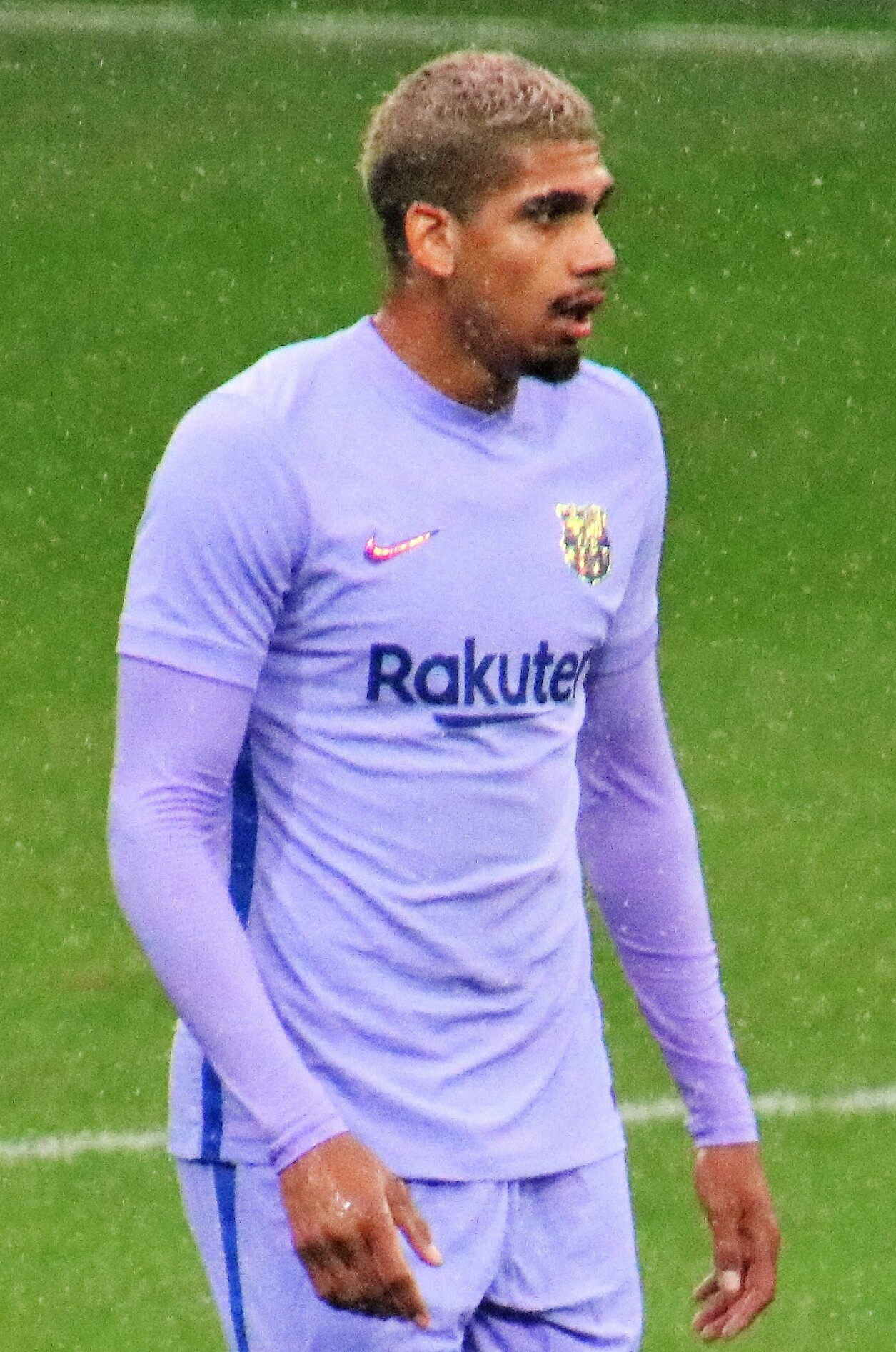
Ronald Araújo playing for Barcelona in 2021

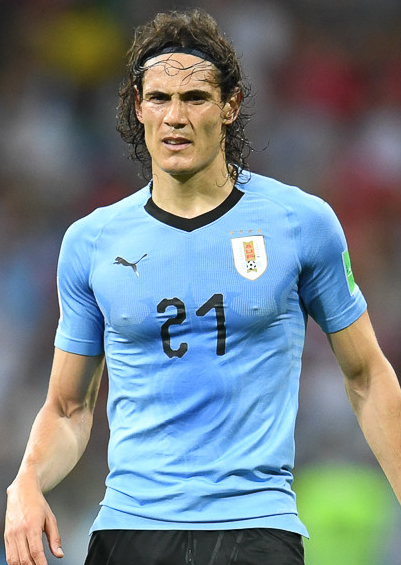
Edinson Cavani in 2018

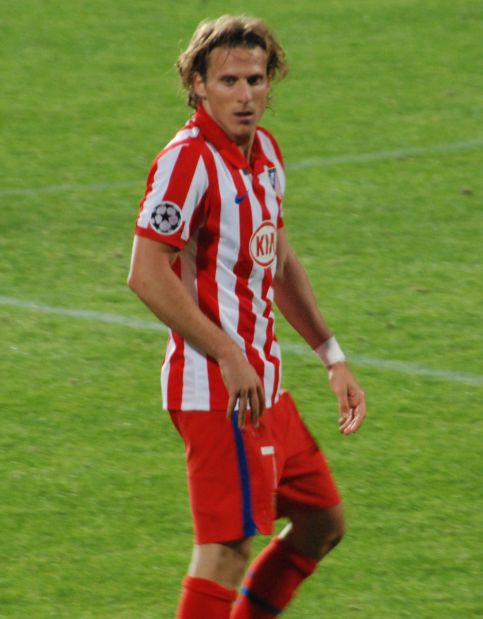
Diego Forlán in action with Atlético Madrid in 2011

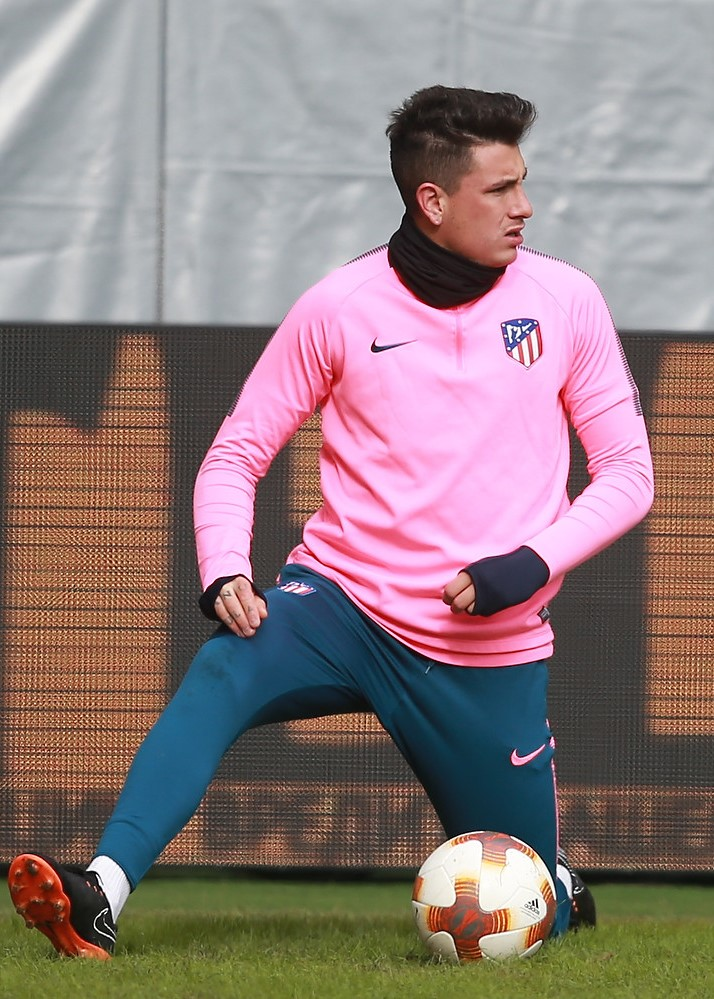
José Giménez training with Atlético Madrid in 2018

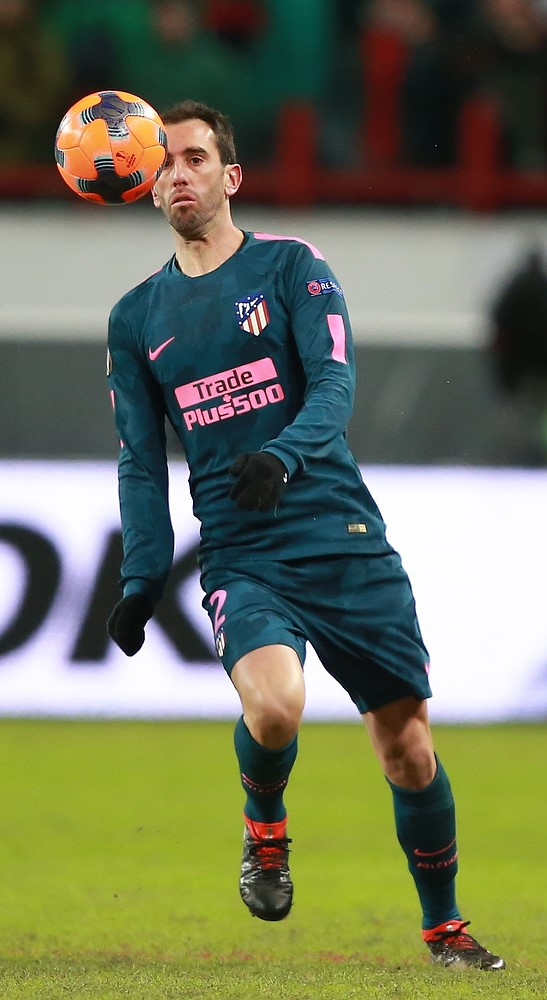
Diego Godín in action for Atlético Madrid in 2018

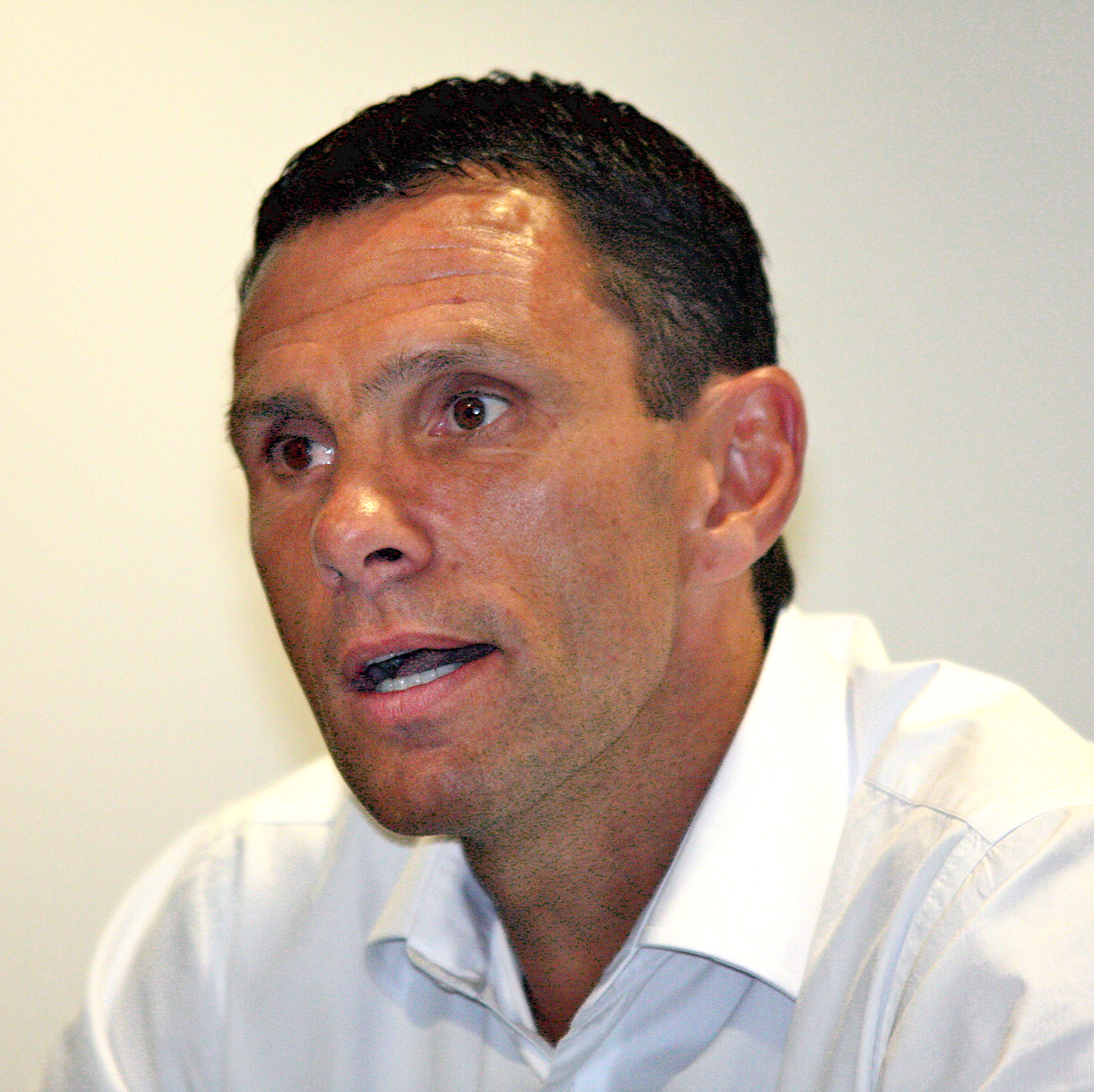
Gustavo Poyet in 2010

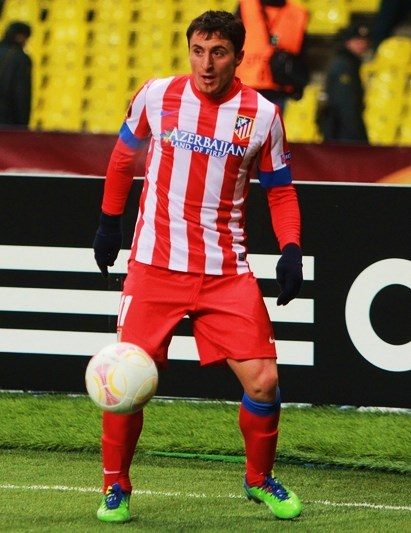
Cristian Rodríguez playing for Atlético Madrid in 2013

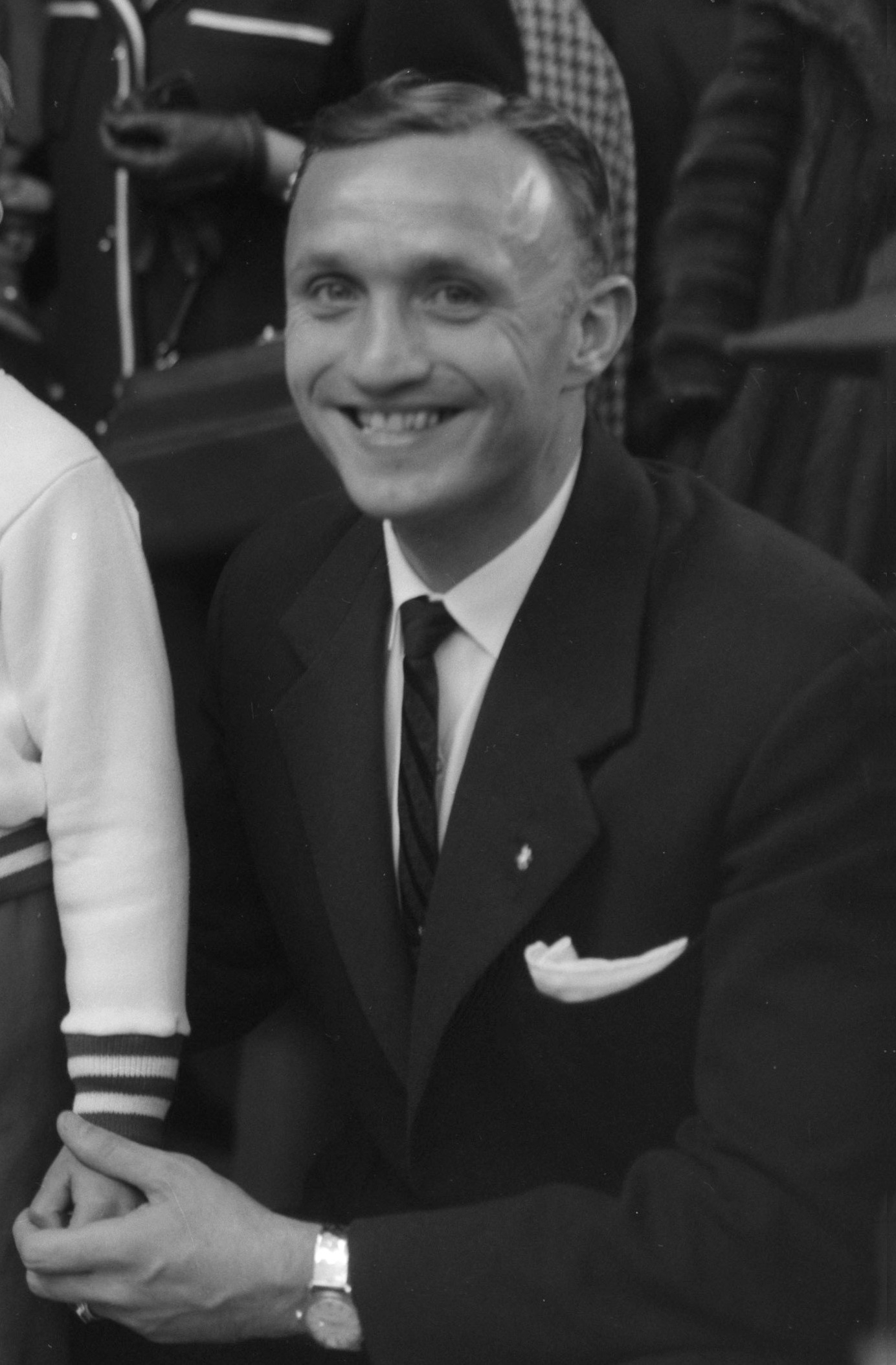
José Santamaría in 1962

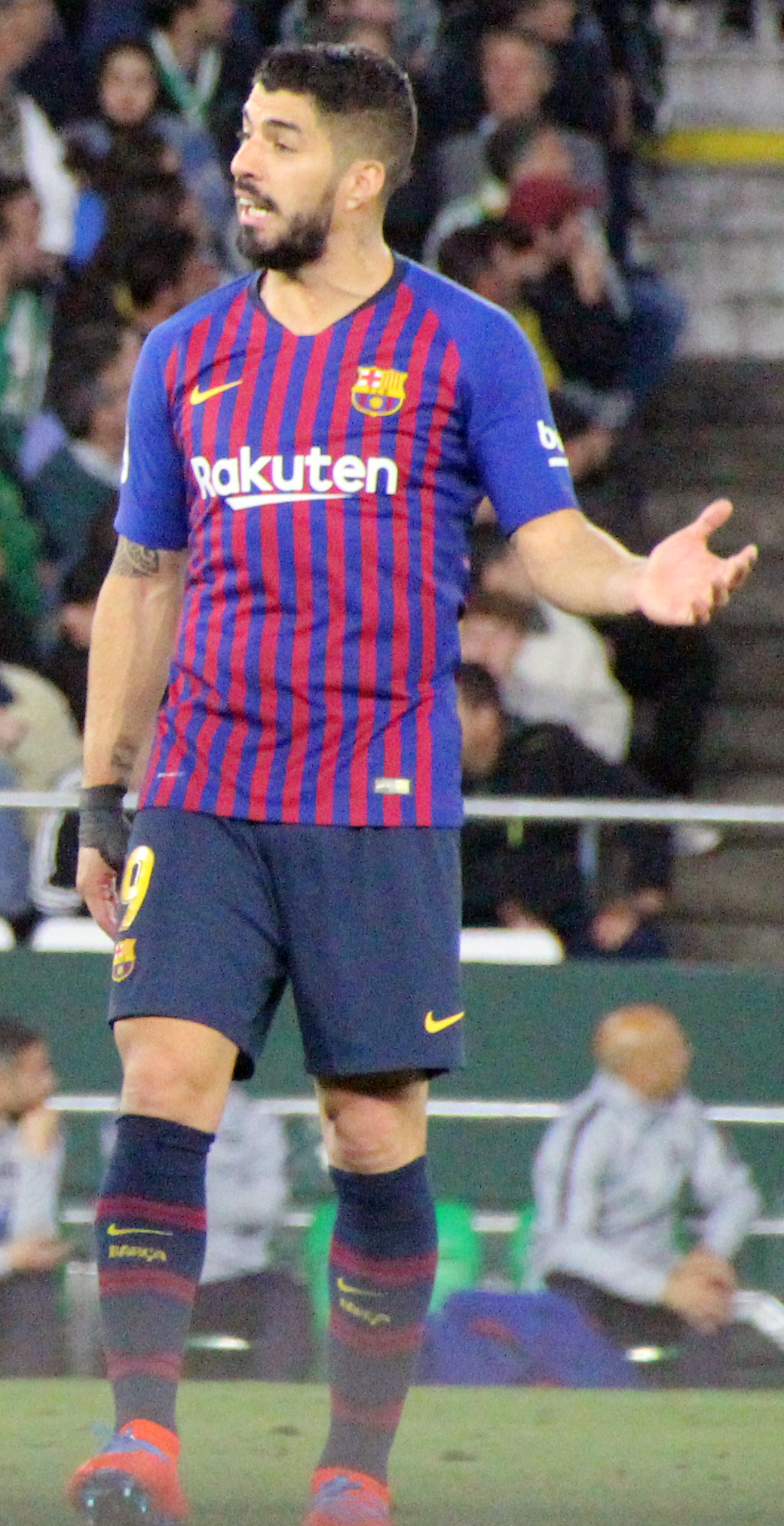
Luis Suárez playing for Barcelona in 2019

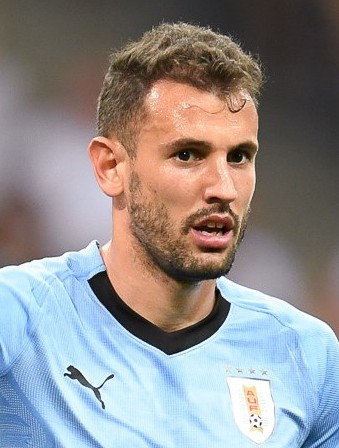
Cristhian Stuani in 2018

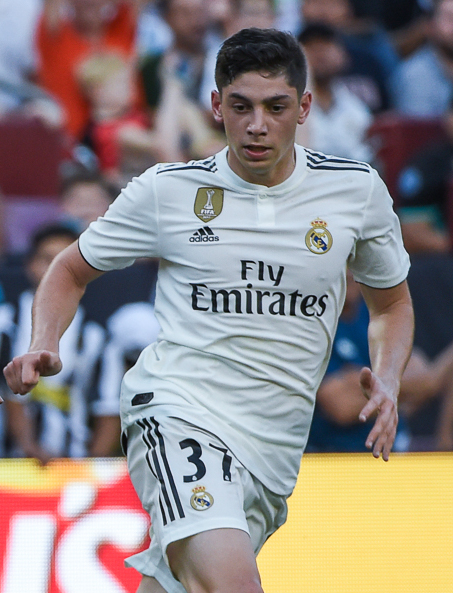
Federico Valverde playing for Real Madrid in 2018

- Nelson Abeijón – Racing – 1997–98
- Sebastián Abreu – Deportivo – 1997–98
- Juan Alberto Acosta – Real Madrid – 1982–83
- Luis Aguerre – Celta – 1973–75
- Matías Aguirregaray – Las Palmas – 2017–18
- Juan Ángel Albín – Getafe, Espanyol – 2006–13
- Daniel Alonso – Sevilla – 1975–77
- Diego Alonso – Valencia, Racing, Málaga – 2000–01, 02–04
- Iván Alonso – Alavés, Murcia, Espanyol – 2000–03, 07–08, 08–11
- Gastón Álvarez – Getafe – 2022–24
- Roberto Álvarez – Rayo – 1979–80
- Antonio Alzamendi – Logroñés – 1988–90
- Alfredo Amarillo – Barcelona, Salamanca, Espanyol – 1976–80, 81–82
- Juan Carlos Aparicio – Celta – 1973–75
- Mauro Arambarri – Getafe – 2017–26
- Ronald Araújo – Barcelona – 2019–26
- Matías Arezo – Granada – 2021–22, 23–24
- Marsol Arias – Tenerife – 1990–91
- Julian Arguedas – Atlético Madrid, Sevilla, Recreativo – 1968–69, 69–70, 71–72
- Danilo Baltierra – Logroñés – 1996–97
- Fernando Barboza – Elche – 1988–89
- Daniel Bartolotta – Oviedo – 1975–76
- Eduardo Belza – Atlético Madrid, Mallorca, Tenerife – 1980–81, 86–88, 89–90
- Pablo Bengoechea – Sevilla – 1987–92
- Julio César Benítez – Valladolid, Zaragoza, Barcelona – 1959–68
- Danny Bergara – Mallorca, Sevilla – 1962–63, 65–66, 67–68, 69–71
- Ignacio Bergara – Mallorca, Espanyol – 1962–63, 64–69
- **Facundo Bernal** – **Betis** – 2026–
- Juan Carlos Blanco – Zaragoza – 1973–77
- Thiago Borbas – Oviedo – 2025–26
- **Sebastián Boselli** – **Getafe** – 2025–
- Miguel Bossio – Valencia, Albacete – 1987–91, 92–93
- Julio César Britos – Real Madrid – 1953–54
- Santiago Bueno – Girona – 2022–23
- Erick Cabaco – Levante, Getafe – 2017–22
- Hugo Cabezas – Betis – 1977–78, 79–80
- Jacinto Cabrera – Valladolid – 1986–88
- **Leandro Cabrera** – Atlético Madrid, Getafe, **Espanyol** – 2009–10, 17–20, 21–23, 24–
- Wilmar Cabrera – Valencia, Sporting – 1984–86, 87–88
- Martín Cáceres – Recreativo, Barcelona, Sevilla, Levante – 2007–09, 10–12, 21–22
- Pablo Cáceres – Mallorca – 2011–12
- **Sebastián Cáceres** – **Celta** – 2026–
- Daniel Cambón – Zaragoza – 1975–76
- Richard Camera – Celta – 1976–77
- Ricardo Canals – Logroñés – 1996–97
- Fabián Canobbio – Valencia, Celta, Valladolid – 2003–04, 05–07, 08–10
- Fabián Carini – Murcia – 2007–08
- Juan Ramón Carrasco – Cádiz – 1986–87
- Gonzalo "Chory" Castro – Mallorca, Real Sociedad, Málaga – 2007–18
- Edinson Cavani – Valencia – 2022–23
- Javier Chevantón – Sevilla – 2006–10
- Juan Contreras – Celta – 1985–86
- Mateo Corbo – Oviedo – 1999–00
- Gabriel Correa – Valladolid, Mérida – 1993–94, 95–96, 97–98
- Fernando Correa – Atlético Madrid, Racing, Mallorca – 1995–00, 02–05
- Sebastián Cristóforo – Sevilla, Getafe, Eibar – 2013–16, 18–19, 19–20
- Luis Cubilla – Barcelona – 1962–64
- José Custodio – Rayo – 1979–80
- Jorge da Silva – Valladolid, Atlético Madrid – 1982–87
- Rubén da Silva – Logroñés – 1991–92
- Mirto Davoine – Mallorca – 1960–62
- Hugo de León – Logroñés – 1987–88
- Lautaro de León – Celta – 2020–21
- Jorge "Chispa" Delgado – Numancia – 1999–01
- Gonzalo de los Santos – Mérida, Málaga, Valencia, Atlético Madrid, Mallorca – 1997–98, 99–05
- Diego López – Racing – 1996–98
- Carlos Diogo – Real Madrid, Zaragoza – 2005–08, 09–11
- Raúl dos Santos – Albacete – 1992–95
- Sebastián Eguren – Villarreal, Sporting – 2007–12
- Eduardo Endériz – Valladolid, Zaragoza, Barcelona, Sevilla – 1959–61, 62–68
- Víctor Espárrago – Recreativo – 1978–79
- Alfonso Espino – Cádiz, Rayo – 2020–26
- Fabián Estoyanoff – Cádiz, Deportivo, Valladolid – 2005–08
- Enrique Fernández – Barcelona – 1935–36
- Gabriel Fernández – Celta – 2019–20
- Gustavo Fernández – Sevilla, Murcia – 1976–79, 80–81
- Seba Fernández – Málaga, Rayo – 2010–14
- Andrés Fleurquín – Cádiz – 2005–06
- Nicolás Fonseca – Oviedo – 2025–26
- Diego Forlán – Villarreal, Atlético Madrid – 2004–11
- Pablo García – Osasuna, Real Madrid, Celta, Murcia – 2002–08
- Voltaire García – Málaga – 1976–77
- Eduardo Gerolami – Sevilla – 1978–80
- **José Giménez** – Atlético Madrid, **Deportivo** – 2013–
- Diego Godín – Villarreal, Atlético Madrid – 2007–19
- Maximiliano Gómez – Celta, Valencia, Cádiz – 2017–23, 23–24
- Alejandro González – Albacete – 1995–96
- **Facundo González** – **Racing** – 2026–
- Giovanni González – Mallorca – 2021–24
- Juan González – Oviedo, Atlético Madrid – 1997–01
- Nacho González – Levante – 2010–11
- Ramiro Guerra Pereyra – Villarreal – 2017–18
- Adrián Gunino – Córdoba – 2014–15
- Álvaro Gutiérrez – Valladolid – 1995–99
- Carlos Gutiérrez – Málaga, Jaén, Las Palmas – 1950–51, 52–55
- Nelson Gutiérrez – Logroñés – 1990–93
- Germán Hornos – Sevilla – 2003–04
- Diego Ifrán – Real Sociedad – 2010–13
- Diego Jaume – Numancia – 1999–01
- Carlos Jurado – Betis – 1971–72
- Gary Kagelmacher – Real Madrid – 2008–09
- Andrés Lamas – Recreativo – 2008–09
- Carlos Lasanta – Hércules – 1977–78
- Martín Lasarte – Deportivo – 1991–92
- Pierino Lattuada – Hércules – 1977–79
- Alejandro Lembo – Betis – 2003–07
- Mauricio Lemos – Las Palmas – 2015–18
- Martín Ligüera – Mallorca – 2003–04
- Nicolás López – Granada – 2015–16
- Julio César Lorant – Sevilla, Elche – 1975–78
- Diego Lugano – Málaga – 2012–13
- José Lujambio – Deportivo – 1949–50
- Federico Magallanes – Racing, Sevilla – 1998–99, 00–01, 03–04
- Alberto Martínez – Las Palmas – 1982–83
- Manteca Martínez – Deportivo – 1997–98
- Gustavo Matosas – Málaga, Lleida, Valladolid – 1988–90, 1993–95
- Alan Matturro – Levante – 2025–26
- Ladislao Mazurkiewicz – Granada – 1974–75
- Alexandre Medina – Cádiz – 2005–06
- Bruno Méndez – Granada – 2023–24
- Peter Méndez – Mallorca – 1991–92
- Denís Milar – Granada – 1975–76
- Dagoberto Moll – Deportivo, Barcelona, Condal, Celta, Elche – 1949–55, 56–58, 59–60
- Julio Montero – Granada – 1973–75
- Richard Morales – Osasuna, Málaga – 2002–06
- Fernando Morena – Rayo, Valencia – 1979–81
- **Santiago Mouriño** – Alavés, **Villarreal** – 2024–
- Gustavo Munúa – Deportivo, Málaga, Levante – 2003–13
- Amaro Carlos Nadal – Sevilla, Logroñés – 1985–88
- Álvaro Núñez – Numancia – 1999–01, 04–05
- Héctor Núñez – Valencia, Mallorca – 1959–66
- Richard Núñez – Atlético Madrid – 2004–05
- Brian Ocampo – Cádiz – 2022–24
- Lucas Olaza – Celta, Valladolid, Elche – 2018–21, 21–23
- Christian Oliva – Valencia – 2020–21
- Mathías Olivera – Getafe – 2017–18, 18–22
- Nicolás Olivera – Valencia, Sevilla, Valladolid, Albacete – 1997–98, 99–00, 01–03, 04–05
- Rubén Olivera – Atlético Madrid – 2003–04
- Sergio Orteman – Racing – 2007–08
- Marcelo Otero – Sevilla – 1999–00
- Julio Outerelo – Celta – 1954–55
- Antonio Pacheco – Espanyol, Albacete – 2001–02, 03–05
- Walter Pandiani – Deportivo, Mallorca, Espanyol, Osasuna – 2000–05, 05–12
- Miguel Peirano – Sevilla – 1984–85
- Walter Pelletti – Castellón – 1989–91
- Facundo Pellistri – Alavés, Granada – 2020–22, 23–24
- Horacio Peralta – Albacete – 2004–05
- José Perdomo – Betis – 1990–91
- Álvaro Pereira – Getafe – 2015–16
- Carlos Peruena – Betis – 1979–82
- Leonel Pilipauskas – Atlético Madrid – 1999–00
- Mario Pini – Valladolid, Mallorca, Sabadell – 1962–64, 65–66, 67–72
- Pablo Pintos – Getafe – 2010–11
- Inti Podestá – Sevilla – 1999–00, 01–04
- Gustavo Poyet – Zaragoza – 1990–97
- Luis Prais – Barcelona – 1949–50
- **Carlos Protesoni** – **Alavés** – 2023–
- Gerardo Rabajda – Sevilla – 1999–00
- Héctor Ramos – Real Madrid, Racing, Elche – 1958–59, 60–65, 66–67
- Leo Ramos – Salamanca – 1998–99
- Mario Regueiro – Racing, Valencia, Murcia – 2000–01, 02–08
- Omar Rey – Hércules, Burgos – 1975–77
- Federico Ricca – Málaga – 2015–18
- Martín Rivas – Málaga – 2000–01
- Álvaro Rodríguez – Real Madrid, Getafe, Elche – 2022–26
- Braian Rodríguez – Betis – 2013–14
- Cristian Rodríguez – Atlético Madrid – 2012–15
- Fernando Rodríguez – Tenerife – 1961–62
- Jonathan Rodríguez – Deportivo – 2015–16
- José Rodríguez – Valladolid – 1962–64
- Sergio Rodríguez – Málaga, Real Madrid, Hércules – 1950–51, 52–56
- Diego Rolán – Málaga, Leganés, Alavés – 2017–19
- Marcelo Romero – Málaga – 2001–06
- Ricardo Salaberry – Oviedo – 1949–50, 52–54
- Gabriel Sánchez Pose – Cádiz – 1989–92
- José Emilio Santamaría – Real Madrid – 1957–66
- Michael Santos – Málaga, Leganés – 2016–17, 18–19
- Marcelo Saracchi – Levante – 2021–22
- **Martín Satriano** – **Getafe** – 2025–
- Darío Silva – Espanyol, Málaga, Sevilla – 1998–05
- Gastón Silva – Granada, Huesca – 2016–17, 20–21
- Tabaré Silva – Sevilla – 1999–00
- Alcides Silveira – Barcelona – 1962–63
- Alfredo Sosa – Pontevedra – 1963–64
- Marcelo Sosa – Atlético Madrid, Osasuna – 2004–06
- Rubén Sosa – Zaragoza, Logroñés – 1985–88, 96–97
- Rafael Souto – Atlético Madrid – 1954–56
- Christian Stuani – Levante, Racing, Espanyol, Girona – 2010–15, 17–19, 22–26
- Damián Suárez – Sporting, Elche, Getafe – 2011–12, 13–16, 17–24
- Edison Suárez – Zaragoza – 1990–92
- Luis Suárez – Barcelona, Atlético Madrid – 2014–22
- Sebastián Taborda – Deportivo – 2005–08
- Washington Tais – Racing, Betis – 1997–05
- Marcelo Tejera – Logroñés – 1996–97
- Lucas Torreira – Atlético Madrid – 2020–21
- Jonathan Urretaviscaya – Deportivo – 2010–11
- **Federico Valverde** – Deportivo, **Real Madrid** – 2017–
- Ernesto Vargas – Oviedo – 1988–89
- Matías Vecino – Celta – 2025–26
- Emiliano Velázquez – Getafe, Rayo – 2014–16, 18–19
- Sebastián Viera – Villarreal – 2005–09
- Hugo Villamide – Espanyol – 1957–59
- Ramón Villaverde – Barcelona – 1954–63
- Federico Viñas – Oviedo – 2025–26
- Marcelo Zalayeta – Sevilla – 1999–00
- José Luis Zalazar – Cádiz, Albacete, Racing – 1987–88, 91–97
- Adolfo Javier Zeoli – Tenerife – 1989–90

=== Venezuela ===
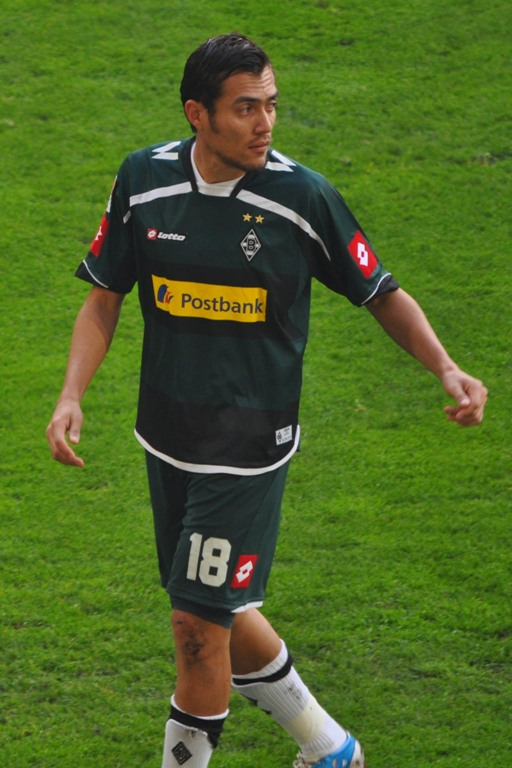
Juan Arango in 2010

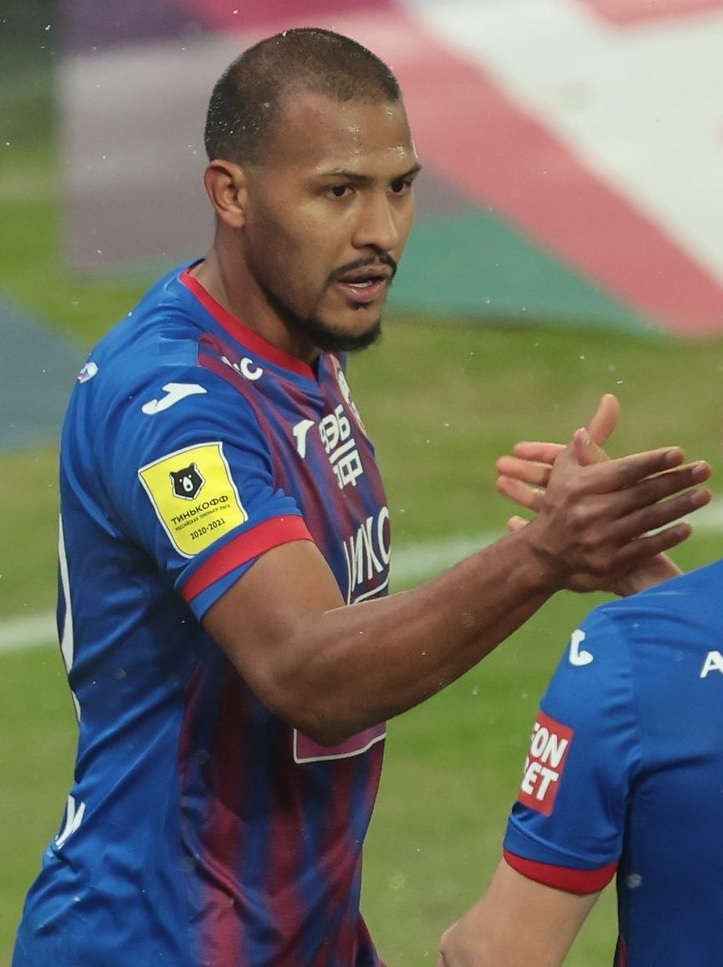
Salomón Rondón in 2021

- Julio Álvarez – Racing, Rayo, Murcia, Almería, Mallorca – 2000–01, 02–04, 08–10
- Fernando Amorebieta – Athletic Bilbao, Sporting – 2005–13, 16–17
- **Jon Aramburu** – **Real Sociedad** – 2023–
- Juan Arango – Mallorca – 2004–09
- Josito González – Las Palmas – 2024–25
- Daniel Hernández "Dani" – Valladolid – 2012–13
- **Yangel Herrera** – Huesca, Granada, Espanyol, Girona, **Real Sociedad** – 2018–
- Juan Pablo Añor "Juanpi" – Málaga, Huesca – 2014–18, 18–19
- Darwin Machís – Granada, Leganés, Valladolid, Cádiz – 2012–13, 14–15, 16–17, 19–22, 22–25
- Giancarlo Maldonado – Xerez – 2009–10
- Nicolás Ladislao Fedor "Miku" – Valencia, Getafe, Rayo – 2009–13, 13–14, 14–16
- Adalberto Peñaranda – Granada, Málaga – 2015–16, 16–18
- Álex Pereira – Recreativo – 2002–03
- José Ravelo – Córdoba – 1965–66, 67–69
- Salomón Rondón – Málaga, Oviedo – 2010–12, 25–26
- Roberto Rosales – Málaga, Espanyol, Leganés – 2014–20
- Christian Santos – Alavés – 2016–18
- Juan Carlos Socorro – Las Palmas – 2001–02
- Jeffrén Suárez – Barcelona, Valladolid – 2008–11, 13–14
- Andrés Túñez – Celta – 2012–13
- Mikel Villanueva – Málaga – 2016–17

== See also ==
- List of foreign Segunda División players
- Oriundo

== Notes ==
1. Born in Albania
2. Born in Angola
3. Born in Argentina
4. Born at sea
5. Born in Austria
6. Born in Belgium
7. Born in Belarus (then part of Soviet Union)
8. Born in Bolivia
9. Born in Bosnia and Herzegovina
10. Born in Bosnia and Herzegovina (then part of SFR Yugoslavia)
11. Born in Brazil
12. Born in Cameroon
13. Born in Canada
14. Born in Cape Verde
15. Born in Croatia (then part of SFR Yugoslavia)
16. Born in Czech Republic (then part of Czechoslovakia)
17. Born in the Democratic Republic of Congo
18. Born in the Democratic Republic of Congo (then Zaïre)
19. Born in Denmark
20. Born in Djibouti
21. Born in England
22. Born in Estonia (then part of Soviet Union)
23. Born in Finland
24. Born in France
25. Born in French Cameroons
26. Born in the French Guiana (Overseas territory of the French Republic)
27. Born in French Morocco
28. Born in Gambia
29. Born in Ghana
30. Born in Greenland
31. Born in Guadeloupe (Overseas territory of the French Republic)
32. Born in Guinea-Bissau
33. Born in Germany
34. Born in the Isle of Man
35. Born in Israel
36. Born in Italy
37. Born in Ivory Coast
38. Born in Kenya
39. Born in Kosovo (then part of SFR Yugoslavia)
40. Born in Kuwait
41. Born in Latvia (then part of Soviet Union)
42. Born in Liberia
43. Born in Macedonia (then part of SFR Yugoslavia)
44. Born in Martinique (Overseas territory of the French Republic)
45. Born in Mexico
46. Born in Moldova (then part of the Kingdom of Romania)
47. Born in Montenegro (then part of SFR Yugoslavia)
48. Born in Mozambique
49. Born in the Netherlands
50. Born in New Caledonia (Overseas territory of the French Republic)
51. Born in Nicaragua
52. Born in Nigeria
53. Born in Norway
54. Born in Poland
55. Born in Portugal
56. Born in Romania
57. Born in Romania (then part of Austria-Hungary)
58. Born in Réunion (Overseas territory of the French Republic)
59. Born in Russia
60. Born in São Tomé and Príncipe
61. Born in Saudi Arabia
62. Born in Senegal
63. Born in Serbia (then part of SFR Yugoslavia)
64. Born in Slovakia
65. Born in Slovakia (then part of Czechoslovakia)
66. Born in Slovenia (then part of SFR Yugoslavia)
67. Born in South Africa
68. Born in Spain
69. Born in Suriname
70. Born in Suriname (then Suriname (Kingdom of the Netherlands))
71. Born in Sweden
72. Born in Switzerland
73. Born in Turkey
74. Born in Uganda
75. Born in Ukraine (then part of Soviet Union)
76. Born in Uruguay
77. Born in the United States
78. Born in West Germany (now part of Germany)
79. Capped for the Albania national under-21 football team
80. Capped for the Aruba national football team
81. Capped for the Basque Country national football team
82. Capped for the Belgium national football team
83. Capped for the Belgium national under-21 football team
84. Capped for the Belgium national under-19 football team
85. Capped for the Belgium national under-18 football team
86. Capped for the Belgium national under-17 football team
87. Capped for the Belgium national under-16 football team
88. Capped for the Belgium national under-15 football team
89. Capped for the Brazil national football team
90. Capped for the Brazil national under-23 football team
91. Capped for the Brazil national under-20 football team
92. Capped for the Brazil national under-18 football team
93. Capped for the Brazil national under-17 football team
94. Capped for the Catalonia national football team
95. Capped for the Colombia national football team
96. Capped for the Corsica national football team
97. Capped for the Croatia national football team
98. Capped for the Czechoslovakia national football team
99. Capped for the Democratic Republic of Congo national football team
100. Capped for the Denmark national under-19 football team
101. Capped for the Denmark national under-18 football team
102. Capped for the Denmark national under-17 football team
103. Capped for the England national under-21 football team
104. Capped for the England national under-20 football team
105. Capped for the England national under-19 football team
106. Capped for the England national under-18 football team
107. Capped for the England national under-17 football team
108. Capped for the England national under-16 football team
109. Capped for the England national under-15 football team
110. Capped for the France national football team
111. Capped for the France national under-21 football team
112. Capped for the France national under-20 football team
113. Capped for the France national under-19 football team
114. Capped for the France national under-18 football team
115. Capped for the France national under-17 football team
116. Capped for the France national under-16 football team
117. Capped for the Germany national under-21 football team
118. Capped for the Germany national under-20 football team
119. Capped for the Germany national under-19 football team
120. Capped for the Germany national under-18 football team
121. Capped for the Germany national under-17 football team
122. Capped for the Germany national under-16 football team
123. Capped for the Germany national under-15 football team
124. Capped for the Germany national under-14 football team
125. Capped for the Italy national football team
126. Capped for the Italy national under-21 football team
127. Capped for the Italy national under-20 football team
128. Capped for the Italy national under-19 football team
129. Capped for the Italy national under-18 football team
130. Capped for the Italy national under-17 football team
131. Capped for the Italy national under-16 football team
132. Capped for the Italy national under-15 football team
133. Capped for the Luxembourg national under-19 football team
134. Capped for the Luxembourg national under-17 football team
135. Capped for the Netherlands national under-21 football team
136. Capped for the Netherlands national under-20 football team
137. Capped for the Netherlands national under-19 football team
138. Capped for the Netherlands national under-18 football team
139. Capped for the Netherlands national under-17 football team
140. Capped for the Netherlands national under-16 football team
141. Capped for the Netherlands national under-15 football team
142. Capped for the Norway national under-18 football team
143. Capped for the Norway national under-17 football team
144. Capped for the Norway national under-16 football team
145. Capped for the Norway national under-15 football team
146. Capped for the Padania national football team
147. Capped for the Poland national under-18 football team
148. Capped for the Portugal national football team
149. Capped for the Portugal national under-23 football team
150. Capped for the Portugal national under-21 football team
151. Capped for the Portugal national under-20 football team
152. Capped for the Portugal national under-19 football team
153. Capped for the Portugal national under-18 football team
154. Capped for the Portugal national under-17 football team
155. Capped for the Portugal national under-16 football team
156. Capped for the Republic of Ireland national under-18 football team
157. Capped for the Romania national under-17 football team
158. Capped for the Romania national under-16 football team
159. Capped for the Soviet Union national under-16 football team
160. Capped for the Spain national football team
161. Capped for the Spain national under-23 football team
162. Capped for the Spain national under-21 football team
163. Capped for the Spain national under-20 football team
164. Capped for the Spain national under-19 football team
165. Capped for the Spain national under-18 football team
166. Capped for the Spain national under-17 football team
167. Capped for the Spain national under-16 football team
168. Capped for the Spain national under-15 football team
169. Capped for the Switzerland national football team
170. Capped for the Switzerland national under-21 football team
171. Capped for the Switzerland national under-20 football team
172. Capped for the Switzerland national under-19 football team
173. Capped for the Switzerland national under-18 football team
174. Capped for the Switzerland national under-17 football team
175. Capped for the Sweden men's national football team
176. Capped for the Sweden national under-21 football team
177. Capped for the Sweden men's national under-19 football team
178. Capped for the Sweden men's national under-17 football team
179. Capped for the Sweden national under-16 football team
180. Capped for the Ukraine national football team
181. Capped for the Ukraine national under-21 football team
182. Capped for the Ukraine national under-20 football team
183. Capped for the Ukraine national under-19 football team
184. Capped for the Ukraine national under-18 football team
185. Capped for the Ukraine national under-17 football team
186. Capped for the United States national football team
187. Capped for the United States men's national under-23 soccer team
188. Capped for the United States men's national under-20 soccer team
189. Capped for the United States men's national under-19 soccer team
190. Capped for the United States men's national under-18 soccer team
191. Capped for the United States men's national under-16 soccer team

== Sources ==
- Foreign Players in the Spanish League (First Division) by RSSSF
