= Renzo (disambiguation) =

Renzo is an Italian given name. It may also refer to:

== Surname ==
- Joe DeRenzo (born 1958), American jazz drummer, composer and producer
- Patrizio Di Renzo (born 1971), Swiss photographer and director
- Jordan Renzo (born 1993), American actor

== Film ==
- Renzo Gracie: Legacy, Brazilian film

== Other uses ==
- Landi Renzo, multinational company
- Renzo Gracie Academy, martial arts school
- Stadio Renzo Barbera, Football stadium in Palermo, Italy
