= Lorenzo (name) =

- Pronunciation: English: /ləˈrɛnzoʊ/ Italian: [loˈrɛntso] Spanish: [loˈɾenθo] (Spain) or [loˈɾenso] (Latin America)
- Gender: Male
- Language: Italian, Spanish

Origin
- Meaning: "From Laurentum", or "Laurelled"
- Region of origin: Italy, Spain

Other names
- Nicknames: Renzo, Enzo, Lencho, Larry
- Related names: Lorenc (Albanian/Polish), Laurens (Dutch), Laurence/Lawrence (English), Lorenz (German), Laurent (French), Laurențiu (Romanian), Lourenço (Portuguese)

Lorenzo is an Italian and Spanish masculine given name of Latin origin. It is used in Italy, Spain, and other Spanish-speaking countries. The name was derived from the Roman surname Laurentius. Laurentum, which is itself named after the laurel tree, was an ancient Roman city of Latium situated between Ostia and Lavinium, on the west coast of the Italian peninsula southwest of Rome.

== People with the given name ==
=== Films, television, and games ===
- Lorenzo Caccialanza (born 1955), Italian-born American actor
- Lorenzo Lamas (born 1958), American actor
- Lorenzo Menakaya, Nigerian actor, filmmaker and radio host
- Lorenzo Milá (born 1960), Spanish newscaster
- Lorenzo Milam (1933–2020), American broadcaster
- Lorenzo Music (1937–2001), American actor
- Lorenzo Tucker (1907–1986), American actor
- Lorenzo Zurzolo (born 2000), Italian actor

=== Music ===
- Lorenzo (rapper), French rapper
- Lorenzo Cherubini, aka Jovanotti (born 1966), Italian rapper and songwriter
- Lorenzo da Firenze, Italian composer and music teacher of the trecento
- Lorenzo Da Ponte (1749–1838), Venetian librettist
- Lorenzo Ferrero (born 1951), Italian composer
- Lorenzo Fragola (born 1995), Italian singer-songwriter
- Lorenzo Jerald Patterson (born 1969), stage name MC Ren, American rapper and hip hop producer
- Don Lorenzo Perosi (1872–1956), Italian composer
- Lorenzo Salvetti (born 2007), Italian singer-songwriter
- Lorenzo Smith (born 1972), American singer and songwriter
- Lorenzo Viotti, Swiss conductor
- Lorenzo de Monteclaro, Mexican singer

=== Politics ===
- Lorenzo II, Duke of Urbino (1492–1519), Italian statesman
- Lorenzo Fontana (born 1980), Italian politician
- Lorenzo de' Medici (1449–1492), Italian statesman
- Lorenzo T. Durand (1849–1917), American politician and lawyer
- Lorenzo II, Raja of Larantuka (1859–1910), Larantukan statesman

=== Sports ===
- Lorenzo Alexander (born 1983), American football linebacker
- Lorenzo Bernard (born 1997), Italian para-cyclist
- Lorenzo Bontempelli (born 1965), Italian racing driver
- Lorenzo Brown (born 1990), basketball player
- Lorenzo Buffon (1929–2025), Italian football player
- Lorenzo Cain (born 1986), American baseball player
- Lorenzo Carter (American football) (born 1995), American football player
- Lorenzo "L.J." Cason (born 2006), American basketball player
- Lorenzo Cittadini (born 1982), Italian rugby union player
- Lorenzo Daniel (born 1966), American track and field sprinter
- Lorenzo Doss (born 1994), American football player
- Lorenzo Duncan (born c. 1965), American basketball player
- Lorenzo Fontana (born 1996), Italian rower
- Lorenzo Insigne (born 1991), Italian footballer
- Lorenzo Ma'afu (born 1987), New Zealand rugby league player
- Lorenzo Mata (born 1986), Mexican-American basketball player
- Lorenzo Mathiot (born 1977), Seychellois footballer
- Lorenzo Musetti (born 2002), Italian tennis player
- Lorenzo Neal (born 1970), American football player
- Lorenzo Palmisani (born 2004), Italian footballer
- Lorenzo Previtali (born 2005), Italian short-track speed skater
- Lorenzo Ramírez (born 1985), Mexican footballer
- Lorenzo Romar (born 1958), American basketball coach
- Lorenzo Scarafoni (born 1965), Italian footballer
- Lorenzo Sonego (born 1995), Italian tennis player
- Lorenzo Staelens (born 1964), Belgian footballer
- Lorenzo Styles (born 1974), American football player
- Lorenzo Styles Jr. (born 2002), American football player
- Lorenzo Ward (born 1967), American football coach
- Lorenzo Washington (1986–2021), American football player

=== Other ===
- Lorenzo Bandini (1935–1967), Italian motor racing driver
- Lorenzo Costa (1460–1535), Italian painter
- Lorenzo Dow (1777–1834), American preacher
- Lorenzo Gafa (1638–1703), Maltese architect
- Lorenzo Ghiberti (1378–1455), Italian artist
- Lorenzo Lotto (1480–1556), Italian painter
- Lorenzo Maitani (1255–1330), Italian architect
- Lorenzo Mascheroni (1750–1800), Italian mathematician
- Lorenzo Odone (1978–2008), American ALD patient, the first treated with Lorenzo's oil
- Lorenzo Ornaghi (born 1948), Italian academic
- Lorenzo Ramero, Italian mathematician
- Lorenzo Ruiz (1594–1637), first Filipino saint
- Lorenzo Snow (1814–1901), American LDS apostle and church president
- Lorenzo Valla (c. 1407–1457), Italian humanist, rhetorician, and educator
- Lorenzo Milkyway, Sully the Lightnerd's husband.

== People with the surname ==
- Edelmiro Lorenzo (1910–1997), Spanish footballer
- Fiorenzo di Lorenzo (1440–1522), Italian painter
- Frank Lorenzo (born 1940), American airline executive and corporate raider
- Gabriele Lorenzo (born 2006), Italian para swimmer
- Gramiccia Lorenzo (1702–1796), Italian painter
- Gonzalo Lorenzo, Spanish footballer
- Irving Lorenzo, aka Irv Gotti (born 1970), American record producer
- Jorge Lorenzo (born 1987), Spanish motorcycle racer
- O'Donell Lorenzo (1910–1979), Spanish footballer
- Ruth Lorenzo (born 1982), Spanish singer and composer
- Santiago Lorenzo (born 1978), Argentine decathlete
- Steven Lorenzo (born 1959), American convicted murderer and serial rapist

== Fictional characters ==
- Lorenzo, a character from Total Drama Presents: The Ridonculous Race
- Lorenzo Bartolini, a character in the 2010 film Letters to Juliet
- Lorenzo Montereal, character in the Filipino television series Lorenzo's Time
- Lorenzo St. John, a character from TV series The Vampire Diaries
- Lorenzo Zoil, a character in the 2011 film Paul

== See also ==
- De Lorenzo, surname
- Lorenza, given name
- Lorenzen Wright (1975–2010), American basketball player
- Lorenzen (surname)
