= Daniel Diaz =

Daniel Diaz may refer to:

== Artists ==
- Daniel Diaz (musician) (Daniel Horacio Díaz Fernández, born 1963), Argentine musician
- Daniel Martin Diaz (born 1967), American artist
- Daniel Díaz Maynard (c. 1934–2007), Uruguayan lawyer and politician
- Daniel Díaz Torres (1948–2013), Cuban film director
- Daniel Vázquez Díaz (1882–1969), Spanish painter

== Sportspeople ==
- Daniel Díaz de León (1910–2006), Mexican footballer
- Daniel Díaz (Chilean footballer) (born 1948), Chilean football right-back
- Cata Díaz (born 1979), born Daniel Alberto Díaz, Argentine football manager and former centre-back
- Daniel Diaz (boxer) (born 1984), Nicaraguan boxer
- Daniel Díaz (cyclist) (born 1989), Argentine cyclist
- Dani Díaz (born 2006), Spanish football winger for Real Sociedad B

== Other people ==
- Daniel Díaz Maynard (c. 1934–2007), Uruguayan lawyer and politician
