= Spanish Amateur Championship =

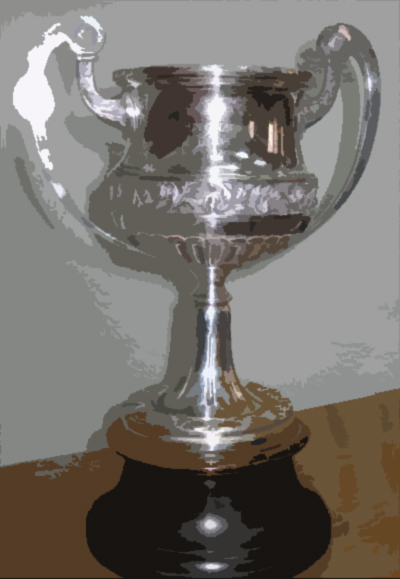
- The Spanish Amateur Championship trophy
- Organiser(s): Recreativo de Huelva
- Founded: 1930
- Abolished: 1987
- Region: Spain
- Last champions: Real Unión (1987)
- Most championships: Real Madrid C (8 titles)

The Spanish Amateur Championship was a football competition contested by non-professional clubs who had been crowned champions of their respective regional amateur championship. It was organized by Royal Spanish Football Federation (RFEF), and except for a three-year hiatus during the Spanish Civil War, it was held every year from 1930 until 1987 for a total of 55 editions, with Real Madrid C being the most successful team with a total of eight titles.

== Overview ==
The Spanish Amateur Championship can be considered the successor of the Spanish Second Category Championship, which was played intermittently in the 1910s and 1920s, and contested by the second-tier clubs of the many regional championships in Spain. It was created by the RFEF in the late 1920s, shortly after professionalism in Spanish football became official, as a means to promote football among non-professional footballers, mostly the youth with the potential to become professional. The competition evolved over the years, being eventually renamed National Amateur Championship under 23 in 1981, after establishing a policy that only allowed the participation of players under 23.

The final was played as a single match on neutral ground until 1972, when it became a two-legged affair, but lack of interest led to its disappearance in 1987. Years later, the RFEF decided to create a similar competition, the Copa Federación de España, which is contested by amateur clubs that do not participate in the Copa del Rey.

== History ==
=== Pre-Civil War ===
In its inaugural edition in 1930, Hércules CF achieved its first major national triumph by reaching the final on 1 June 1930, which ended in a 3–2 loss to Club Gijón of Asturias, courtesy of goals from Avilesu and Vallejo (2). In the 1932 tournament, Imperio of Madrid won the tournament after beating the Basques Erandio Club 3–0 in the final at the Chamartín, with all of the goals being scored in the first-half by Suaréz, Salazar, and Emilín. Two of the players who started for Imperio in this final were then signed by Real Madrid within the next two years, Emilio Villa and Avelino Álvarez. However, Erandio managed to redeem itself in the following season, claiming the trophy after beating Sevilla Amateur 1–0 in the final at the Montjuïc stadium, but Sevilla achieved redemption as well, as they went on to win back-to-back tournaments in 1935 and 1936, defeating Club Ciosvin de Vigo (6–1) and Real Zaragoza (3–2) in the finals; notably, Manuel Palencia scored a hat-trick in the former and another one in the latter, while Salustiano Santos, who went on to become a substitute to Guillermo Gorostiza, scored the opening goal in the 1936 final.

=== Results ===
Quarter-finals
15 April
(Basque Country (autonomous community)) Real Unión | 6
(Biscay) Basconia | 0
15 April
(Asturias) Racing de Sama | 1
(Galicia (Spain)) Eiriña | 0
15 April
(Catalonia) Europa | 2
(Valencian Community) Olímpic de Xàtiva | 5
15 April
(Community of Madrid) Ferroviaria | 5
(Andalusia) Onuba | 2

Semi-finals
22 April
(Basque Country (autonomous community)) Real Unión | 5
(Asturias) Racing de Sama | 0
22 April
(Valencian Community) Olímpic de Xàtiva | 3
(Community of Madrid) Ferroviaria | 0

Final
6 May – Madrid
(Basque Country (autonomous community)) Real Unión | 2
(Valencian Community) Olímpic de Xàtiva | 1

=== Final ===
6 May 1934

| (Basque Country (autonomous community)) Real Unión | 2 - 1 | Olímpic de Xàtiva (Valencian Community) |
|---|---|---|
| Echeza 42'; René Petit 65' | RSSSF; Bdfutbol | Bernet 2' |

Les Corts, Barcelona
Referee: Comorera

=== 1940s and 1950s ===
Just like the War, the return of the competition in 1940 proved to be a disaster, as the final between Stadium Club Avilesino of Asturias and Burjassot of Valencia ended in a 3–3 draw, and after two periods of extra-time, several incidents, and four expelled by the Burjasot, it had to be suspended for lack of visibility, but the Valencians did not show up for the final 48 hours later. Avilesino could thus have been crowned champions by default, but they instead agreed to play again in the final, although this time against the team that Burjassot had knocked out in the semifinals, the defending champions Sevilla Amateur, who still had Palencia in its ranks, and for good reason, as he scored two more goals in the final in an eventual 2–4 loss; all of Avilesino's goals were scored by José Gutiérrez Mijares.

In the following edition, the 1941 final was contested by Real Zaragoza and Alcoyano, who went on to achieve promotion to La Liga a few years later, thus being replaced by Real Zaragoza B and Alcoyano Amateur, respectively. The future Real Madrid player Castor Elzo was a member of Zaragoza's winning team. In the following years, the amateur teams of the big clubs gained prominence, with Valencia amateur beating Indautxu in the 1942 final, which was refereed by Ramón Melcón, while the amateur sides of Sevilla and Barcelona fell short in the 1943, 1944, and 1945 finals, which they lost to the likes of Club Langreano, Barreda Balompié, and Indautxu, respectively, with Barreda fielding Cristobal Ceballos, a former Barça player, and Indautxu fielding Francisco Arencibia, on loan from Atlético Madrid. The 1946 and 1947 editions were then won by Ferroviaria, beating Mestalla (3–2) and Indautxu 2–0. This was the first of three consecutive losses in finals to Indautxu, being beaten in the next two by CD Alcoyano and Barcelona Amateur. The goalkeeper of Barça's winning team was Manuel Garriga.

The most dominant region in the 1950s was the Basque Country with four victories, two from Eibar (1953 and 1956), and one each from Baskonia (1951) and Galdakao (1957), while Salamanca became not only the first team from Castile and León to win a title, but also only the third club to win it twice in a row (1958 and 1959) after Sevilla Amateur and Ferroviaria.

=== 1960s and 1970s: El Classico ===
Except for 1969, every single final in the 1960s featured either Barcelona Amateur or Real Madrid Aficionados, and between 1962 and 1967, they faced each other in the final on five occasions, with their hegemony being broken only by Osasuna B in 1964. Barça ended up losing all five finals, which allowed Madrid to win a record-shattering six consecutive finals between 1962 and 1967, all of which by the minimum margin (one 1–0, three 2–1, and two 4–3), with Madrid's winning goals being scored by Antonio Iznata (1962), Jiménez (1963), Miguel González (1964), Aparicio (1965 and 1966), and Antolín Ortega (1967).

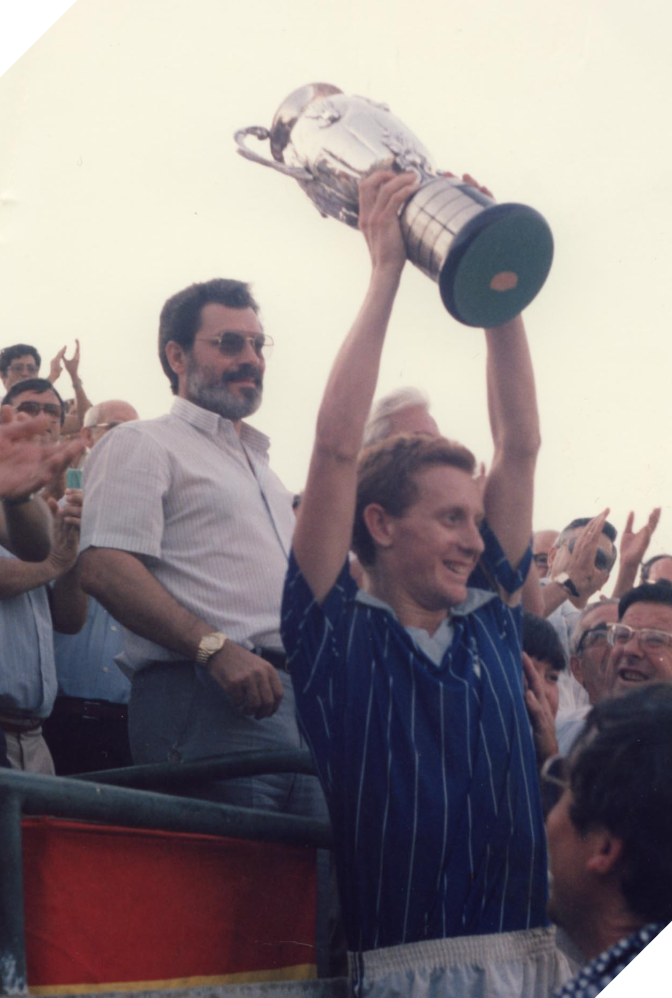
Presentation of the 1985 cup to the captain of CD Naval de Cartagena.

In the following edition, in 1968, Madrid Amateur did not qualify, but Barça lost in the final anyways, this time to Bilbao Athletic, who thus won their first title. In the following edition, Cuatro Caminos defeated Cultural Leonesa 5–2 in the final, thus winning their second title, having previously nearly 20 years before in 1950. After a two-year hiatus, Madrid returned to the Amateur Championship, doing so in style, as they defeated UD San Antonio 5–0 in the final, partly thanks to a second-half brace from Vicente del Bosque, thus winning its 8th and last championship, twice as many titles as the next closest team, Barcelona Amateur, with four titles in 1949, 1952, 1961, and 1971.

=== Later years ===
In the 1975–76 season, Betis' reserve team, known as Betis B or Betis Amateur, played in the Regional Preferente division under the direction of Esteban Areta, which they won, thus achieving promotion to the Tercera División, and in Amateur Championship, they eliminated Guadalajara and Naval de Reinosa, but then lost in the final to Reus Deportiu. In the 1970s, Almansa reached the final three times, in 1975, 1977, and 1978, but lost all of them, the first (and only) to Albacete Balompié, who thus became the first team from Castilla-La Mancha to win, the second to Toscal, who thus became the first (and only) team from the Canary Islands to win, and the third to Cartagena, who thus became the first team from the region of Murcia to win.

The early 1980s was once again dominated by the amateur teams of big clubs, with Barcelona winning their fifth and sixth title in 1980 and 1982, while Real Zaragoza Amateur won its first three titles in 1981, 1983, and 1984. In the 1980 final, Barça defeated their nemesis Madrid, the latter's first-ever loss in a final. The last edition in 1987 was won by Real Unión.

== Results ==
| Season | Champion | Runner–up | Result | Local |
|---|---|---|---|---|
| 1930 | (Asturias) Club Gijón | Hércules | 3–2 | Barcelona |
| 1931 | (Galicia (Spain)) Club Ciosvin de Vigo | Huesca | 4–1 | Madrid |
| 1932 | (Community of Madrid) Imperio | Erandio Club | 3–0 | Madrid |
| 1933 | (Basque Country (autonomous community)) Erandio Club | Sevilla Amateur | 1–0 | Barcelona |
| 1934 | (Basque Country (autonomous community)) Real Unión | Olímpic de Xàtiva | 2–1 | Barcelona |
| 1935 | (Andalusia) Sevilla Amateur | Club Ciosvin de Vigo | 6–1 | Madrid |
| 1936 | (Andalusia) Sevilla Amateur | Real Zaragoza | 3–1 | Valencia |
| 1937–39 | Not held because of the Civil War | | | |
| 1940 | (Asturias) Stadium Club Avilesino | Sevilla Amateur | 3–3 / 4–2 | Zaragoza / Madrid |
| 1941 | (Aragon) Real Zaragoza | Alcoyano | 2–0 | Valencia |
| 1942 | (Valencian Community) Valencia CF Amateur | Indautxu | 3–1 | Madrid |
| 1943 | (Asturias) Club Langreano | Sevilla Amateur | 3–1 | Madrid |
| 1944 | (Cantabria) Barreda Balompié | Barcelona Amateur | 3–1 | Barcelona |
| 1945 | (Basque Country (autonomous community)) Indautxu | Barcelona Amateur | 3–0 | Bilbao |
| 1946 | (Community of Madrid) Ferroviaria | Mestalla | 3–2 | Madrid |
| 1947 | (Community of Madrid) Ferroviaria | Indautxu | 2–0 | Madrid |
| 1948 | (Valencian Community) Alcoyano | Indautxu | 4–0 | Madrid |
| 1949 | (Catalonia) Barcelona Amateur | Indautxu | 3–2 | Barcelona |
| 1950 | (Community of Madrid) Cuatro Caminos | Getxo | 2–2 / 5–3 | Madrid |
| 1951 | (Basque Country (autonomous community)) Baskonia | Chamberí de Madrid | 1–0 | Madrid |
| 1952 | (Catalonia) Barcelona Amateur | Marín CF | 4–1 | Madrid |
| 1953 | (Basque Country (autonomous community)) Eibar | Rayo Vallecano | 7–1 | Zaragoza |
| 1954 | (Community of Madrid) Boetticher de Villaverde | Burriana | 2–0 | Zaragoza |
| 1955 | (Community of Madrid) Agromán CF de Madrid | Arenas de Zaragoza | 3–2 | Madrid |
| 1956 | (Basque Country (autonomous community)) Eibar | Sevilla Amateur | 3–0 | Madrid |
| 1957 | (Basque Country (autonomous community)) Galdakao | Salamanca | 4–1 | Bilbao |
| 1958 | (Castile and León) Salamanca | Azkoyen | 5–2 | Madrid |
| 1959 | (Castile and León) Salamanca | Porriño Industrial | 4–0 | Madrid |
| 1960 | (Community of Madrid) Real Madrid Aficionados | Peñarroya-Pueblonuevo | 4–2 | Madrid |
| 1961 | (Catalonia) Barcelona Amateur | Tomelloso | 3–2 | Valencia |
| 1962 | (Community of Madrid) Real Madrid Aficionados | Barcelona Amateur | 2–1 | Zaragoza |
| 1963 | (Community of Madrid) Real Madrid Aficionados | Barcelona Amateur | 1–0 | Valencia |
| 1964 | (Community of Madrid) Real Madrid Aficionados | Osasuna B | 2–1 | Zaragoza |
| 1965 | (Community of Madrid) Real Madrid Aficionados | Barcelona Amateur | 4–3 | Valencia |
| 1966 | (Community of Madrid) Real Madrid Aficionados | Barcelona Amateur | 4–3 | Alicante |
| 1967 | (Community of Madrid) Real Madrid Aficionados | Barcelona Amateur | 2–1 | Zaragoza |
| 1968 | (Basque Country (autonomous community)) Bilbao Athletic | Barcelona Amateur | 4–1 | Zaragoza |
| 1969 | (Community of Madrid) Cuatro Caminos | Cultural Leonesa | 5–2 | Valladolid |
| 1970 | (Community of Madrid) Real Madrid Aficionados | UD San Antonio | 5–0 | Alicante |
| 1971 | (Catalonia) Barcelona Amateur | Getxo | 3–1 | Castelló de la Plana |
| 1972 | (Basque Country (autonomous community)) Aretxabaleta | Real Murcia Imperial | 2–1 / 2–2 | |
| 1973 | (Basque Country (autonomous community)) Anaitasuna | Cacereño | 4–1 | San Sebastián |
| 1974 | (Aragon) SD Huesca | Deportivo Aragón | 0–0 / 3–0 | |
| 1975 | (Castilla–La Mancha) Albacete Balompié | Almansa | 5–0 / 0–1 | |
| 1976 | (Catalonia) Reus Deportiu | Real Betis Amateur | 0–0 / 5–0 | |
| 1977 | (Canary Islands) Toscal | Almansa | 4–2 / 1–2 | |
| 1978 | (Region of Murcia) Cartagena | Almansa | 2–0 / 1–3 | |
| 1979 | (Valencian Community) Puçol | Carcaixent | 4–1 / 1–1 | |
| 1980 | (Catalonia) Barcelona Amateur | Real Madrid Aficionados | 4–0 / 1–0 | |
| 1981 | (Aragon) Real Zaragoza Amateur | RCD Espanyol Amateur | 2–0 / 1–2 | |
| 1982 | (Catalonia) Barcelona Amateur | Mazarrón | 2–0 / 3–0 | |
| 1983 | (Aragon) Real Zaragoza Amateur | Castellón B | 6–1 / 2–2 | |
| 1984 | (Aragon) Real Zaragoza Amateur | Terrassa | 1–0 / 2–1 | |
| 1985 | (Region of Murcia) Naval de Cartagena | Real Oviedo Amateur | 1–3 / 4–1 | |
| 1986 | (Valencian Community) Castellón B | Getafe | 10–0 / 2–2 | |
| 1987 | (Basque Country (autonomous community)) Real Unión | Trintxerpe | 0–1 / 1–2 | |

== List of winners ==
| Team | Titles | Runner-up | Details |
|---|---|---|---|
| (Community of Madrid) Real Madrid C | 8 (1960, 1962–1967, 1970) | 1 (1980) | Under the name of Real Madrid Aficionados |
| (Catalonia) FC Barcelona C | 6 (1949, 1952, 1961, 1971, 1980, 1982) | 8 (1944–45, 1962–63, 1965–68) | Under the name of Barcelona Amateur |
| (Aragon) Real Zaragoza B ^{(1)} | 3 (1981, 1983, 1984) | | Under the name of Real Zaragoza Aficionados |
| (Andalusia) Sevilla Amateur | 2 (1935, 1936) | 4 (1933, 1940, 1943, and 1956) |
| (Community of Madrid) Ferroviaria | 2 (1946, 1947) |
| (Basque Country (autonomous community)) Eibar | 2 (1953, 1956) |
| (Castile and León) Salamanca | 2 (1958, 1959) | 1 (1957) |
| (Community of Madrid) Cuatro Caminos | 2 (1950, 1969) |
| (Basque Country (autonomous community)) Real Unión | 2 (1934, 1987) |
| (Basque Country (autonomous community)) Indautxu | 1 (1945) | 4 (1942 and 1947–49) |
| (Galicia (Spain)) Club Ciosvin de Vigo* | 1 (1931) | 1 (1935) |
| (Basque Country (autonomous community)) Erandio Club | 1 (1933) | 1 (1932) |
| (Aragon) Real Zaragoza ^{(1)} | 1 (1941) | 1 (1936) |
| (Valencian Community) Valencia Mestalla | 1 (1942) | 1 (1946) | Under the name of CD Mestalla/Valencia Amateur |
| (Valencian Community) Castellón B | 1 (1986) | 1 (1983) |
| (Asturias) Club Gijón | 1 (1930) |
| (Community of Madrid) Imperio* | 1 (1932) |
| (Asturias) Real Avilés | 1 (1940) |
| (Asturias) Club Langreano | 1 (1943) |
| (Cantabria) Barreda Balompié | 1 (1944) |
| (Valencian Community) Alcoyano Amateur* ^{(2)} | 1 (1948) |
| (Basque Country (autonomous community)) Basconia | 1 (1951) |
| (Community of Madrid) Boetticher & Navarro de Villaverde* | 1 (1954) |
| (Community of Madrid) Agromán CF | 1 (1955) |
| (Basque Country (autonomous community)) Galdakao | 1 (1957) |
| (Basque Country (autonomous community)) Bilbao Athletic | 1 (1968) |
| (Basque Country (autonomous community)) Aretxabaleta | 1 (1972) |
| (Basque Country (autonomous community)) Anaitasuna | 1 (1973) |
| (Aragon) Huesca | 1 (1974) |
| (Castilla–La Mancha) Albacete Balompié | 1 (1975) |
| (Catalonia) Reus Deportiu | 1 (1976) |
| (Canary Islands) Toscal* | 1 (1977) |
| (Region of Murcia) Cartagena | 1 (1978) |
| (Valencian Community) Puçol | 1 (1979) |
| (Region of Murcia) Naval de Cartagena | 1 (1985) |
| (Castilla–La Mancha) Almansa | | 3 (1975, 1977, and 1978) |
| (Basque Country (autonomous community)) Getxo | | 2 (1950 and 1971) |
| (Valencian Community) Hércules | | 1 (1930) |
| (Aragon) Huesca | | 1 (1931) |
| (Valencian Community) Olímpic de Xàtiva | | 1 (1934) |
| (Valencian Community) Alcoyano ^{(4)} | | 1 (1941) |
| (Community of Madrid) Chamberí de Madrid | | 1 (1951) |
| (Galicia (Spain)) Marín CF | | 1 (1952) |
| (Community of Madrid) Rayo Vallecano | | 1 (1953) |
| (Valencian Community) Burriana | | 1 (1954) |
| (Aragon) Arenas de Zaragoza | | 1 (1955) |
| (Navarre) Azkoyen | | 1 (1958) |
| (Galicia (Spain)) Porriño Industrial | | 1 (1959) |
| (Andalusia) Peñarroya-Pueblonuevo | | 1 (1960) |
| (Castilla–La Mancha) Tomelloso | | 1 (1961) |
| (Navarre) Osasuna B | | 1 (1964) |
| (Castile and León) Cultural Leonesa | | 1 (1969) |
| (Canary Islands) UD San Antonio | | 1 (1970) |
| (Region of Murcia) Real Murcia Imperial | | 1 (1972) |
| (Extremadura) Cacereño | | 1 (1973) |
| (Aragon) Deportivo Aragón | | 1 (1974) |
| (Andalusia) Real Betis B | | 1 (1976) |
| (Valencian Community) Carcaixent | | 1 (1979) |
| (Catalonia) Espanyol Amateur* | | 1 (1981) |
| (Region of Murcia) Mazarrón | | 1 (1982) |
| (Catalonia) Terrassa | | 1 (1984) |
| (Asturias) Real Oviedo Amateur | | 1 (1985) |
| (Community of Madrid) Getafe | | 1 (1986) |
| (Basque Country (autonomous community)) Trintxerpe | | 1 (1987) |

^{(1)}Real Zaragoza played in this championship before being promoted to La Liga, thus being replaced by its subsidiary Real Zaragoza B.
^{(2)}Alcoyano played in this championship before being promoted to La Liga, thus being replaced by its subsidiary Alcoyano Amateur.

== List of winners by regions ==
| Region | Champion | Runner-up |
|---|---|---|
| (Community of Madrid) Madrid | 15 | 4 |
| (Basque Country (autonomous community)) Basque Country | 11 | 8 |
| Catalonia | 7 | 10 |
| Aragon | 5 | 4 |
| (Valencian Community) Valencia | 4 | 7 |
| Asturias | 3 | 1 |
| Andalusia | 2 | 6 |
| Castile and León | 2 | 2 |
| (Region of Murcia) Murcia | 2 | 2 |
| (Castilla–La Mancha) Castilla-La Mancha | 1 | 4 |
| (Galicia (Spain)) Galicia | 1 | 3 |
| Canary Islands | 1 | 1 |
| Cantabria | 1 | - |
| (Navarre) Navarra | - | 2 |
| Extremadura | - | 1 |
| La Rioja | - | - |
| (Balearic Islands) Baleares | - | - |
| Total | 55 | 55 |
