= José Garreta =

José Garreta may refer to:

- José Garreta (footballer, born 1912), Spanish footballer
- José Garreta (footballer, born 1941), Spanish footballer and son of the above
