= Lorenzo =

Lorenzo may refer to:

== People ==
- Lorenzo (name)

== Places ==
=== Peru ===
- San Lorenzo Island (Peru), sometimes referred to as the island of Lorenzo

=== United States ===
- Lorenzo, Illinois
- Lorenzo, Texas
- San Lorenzo, California, formerly Lorenzo
- Lorenzo State Historic Site, house in New York State listed on the National Register of Historic Places

== Art, entertainment, and media ==
Films and television

- Lorenzo (film), an animated short film
- Lorenzo's Oil, a film based on a true story about a boy suffering from Adrenoleukodystrophy and his parents' journey to find a treatment.
- Lorenzo's Time, a 2012 Philippine TV series that aired on ABS-CBN

Music

- Lorenzo (rapper), French rapper
- "Lorenzo", a 1996 song by Phil Collins

== Other uses ==
- List of storms named Lorenzo
- Lorenzo (electronic health record), used at some NHS trusts in the United Kingdom

== See also ==
- San Lorenzo (disambiguation)
- De Lorenzo
- di Lorenzo
- Lorenzen (disambiguation)
