= Spanish Second Category Championship =

- Founded: 1913
- Folded: 1926
- Country: Spain
- Last champions: Pasayako
- Most championships: Six different winners

The Spanish Second Category Championship, also known as the Spanish First Category B Championship or Spanish Group B Championship, was a Spanish football competition organized by the Spanish Football Federation that was contested between 1913 and 1926.

The competition was played in knockout rounds and it was contested by the regional champions of the Second Category, while the champions of the first played in the Copa del Rey.

== History ==
The first known edition was in 1913, a free-entry competition open to second-tier teams or second teams of first-tier clubs. This edition was won by Sabadell FC. In 1920, the tournament organized by the Spanish Football Federation returned, won by the Stadium of Avilés by beating the Martinenc and the Stadium of Madrid.

Years later, between 1923 and 1926, four more editions were held, but the lack of support from the RFEF, and the cost and difficulty of travel, ended up causing the clubs to lose interest in the competition, thus disappearing.

A few years later, in 1930, Spanish Amateur Championship was created, a competition contested by non-professional clubs and which is considered by some as the natural successor of the Spanish Second Category Championship.

== Winners ==
Season	Champion	Runner-up	Result	Seu
1913	(Catalonia) Sabadell FC	(Community of Madrid) Cardenal Cisneros FC	1–2, 2–1, 1–1, 1–1, 1–0 (Note: Es disputà un partit d'anada i un de tornada, més tres desempats.)	Madrid
1920	(Asturias) Stadium Avilesino	(Catalonia) Martinenc	3–2	Gijón
1923	(Catalonia) Martinenc	(Basque Country (autonomous community)) CD Esperanza	4–2	Atotxa Stadium, San Sebastián
1924	(Basque Country (autonomous community)) Acero Club de Bilbao	(Navarre) Osasuna	2–1	Sevilla
1925	(Catalonia) Júpiter	(Asturias) Athletic de Gijón	4–1	Mestalla Stadium, Valencia
1926	(Basque Country (autonomous community)) Pasayako LE	(Catalonia) FC Badalona	2–2, 1–0 (Note: Tie-breaker.)	Zaragoza

== Editions ==
=== 1913 Championship ===
In this edition, the Catalan champion of the second-tier, FC Internacional, decided not to participate along with the runner-up Sabadell FC, Stadium FC, and New-Catalònia FC. The Madrid semi-final phase, on the other hand, was contested by RS Gimnástica, Madrid FC, Fortuna FC, Regional FC, Cardenal Cisneros FC, Union Sporting Club, and Sociedad Deportiva del Centro de Instrucción Comercial. The champion took home a silver cup offered by King Alfonso XIII.

Fase de Barcelona

11 May 1913

Stadium FC	2–1 (Note: The winning goal was scored in the 55th minute of extra time.)	New-Catalònia FC

Camp de l'Universitari, Barcelona

18 May 1913

Sabadell FC	1–0 (Note: A 20-minute overtime will be played.)	Stadium FC

Camp de l'Espanya, Barcelona
Referee: Rocha

Madrid phase

11 May 1913

Cardenal Cisneros FC	2–0	Regional FC

Camp del Madrid FC, Madrid
11 May 1913

RS Gimnástica	5–1	Union Sporting Club

Camp de la Gimnástica, Madrid
11 May 1913

Fortuna FC	3–0	Sociedad Deportiva

Camp de l'Athletic de Madrid, Madrid

18 May 1913 ?

RS Gimnástica	1–0	Madrid FC

Madrid
18 May 1913 ?

Cardenal Cisneros FC	11–0	Fortuna FC

Madrid

18 May 1913 ?

Cardenal Cisneros FC	1–0	RS Gimnástica

Madrid

Final

22 May 1913

Cardenal Cisneros FC	2–1	Sabadell FC

Madrid
Referee: José Irureta Abonz
23 May 1913

Cardenal Cisneros FC	1–2	Sabadell FC

Madrid
Referee: Felip Daví
24 May 1913

Cardenal Cisneros FC	1–1 (Note: A 14-minute extra time was played, until the match was suspended due to lack of light.)	Sabadell FC

Madrid
Referee: José Manuel Kindelán
26 May 1913

Cardenal Cisneros FC	1–1	Sabadell FC

Madrid
Referee: Manuel Prast
27 May 1913

Cardenal Cisneros FC	0–1	Sabadell FC

Camp de la Gimnástica, Madrid
Referee: Manuel Prast

=== 1923 Championship ===
This edition was contested by the champions of Biscay (Acero Club de Bilbao), Gipuzkoa (CD Esperanza de San Sebastián), Galícia (Eiriña CF), Asturias (Racing de Sama), Catalonia (Martinenc), Levante (Burjassot), Andalusia (Real Balompédica Linense), and Madrid (USC de Madrid).

Quarter-finals

25 March 1923

Acero de Bilbao	7–2	Unión Sporting

San Mamés, Bilbao
25 March 1923

Racing de Sama	v	Burjassot (forfeits)

Llangréu
25 March 1923

Martinenc	v	RB Linense (forfeits)

Barcelona
25 March 1923

CD Esperanza	v	Eiriña (forfeits)

Atotxa Stadium, San Sebastián

15 April 1923

Unión Sporting	2–0	Acero de Bilbao

Madrid

17 April 1923

Unión Sporting	6–0	Acero de Bilbao

Madrid

Semifinals

22 April 1923

Racing de Sama	5–1	Martinenc

Llangréu
Referee: José María Steimborn
22 April 1923

Unión Sporting	2–3	CD Esperanza

Madrid
Referee: Manuel Lemmel

29 April 1923

Martinenc	5–1	Racing de Sama

Barcelona
Referee: Francisco Contreras
29 April 1923

CD Esperanza	3–0	Unión Sporting

Atotxa Stadium, San Sebastián
Referee: Josep Torrens

1 May 1923

Martinenc	3–0	Racing de Sama

Barcelona
Referee: Antonio Larrañaga

Final

13 May 1923

CD Esperanza	2–4	Martinenc

Atotxa Stadium, San Sebastián
Referee: Pedro Vallana

=== 1924 Championship ===
This edition was contested by the champions of Biscay (Acero Club de Bilbao), Gipuzkoa/Navarra (Osasuna), Galicia (Alfonso XIII CF), Asturias (Club Fortuna Gijonés), Catalonia (Terrassa), Levante (FC Stadium de València), Aragon (Huesca FC), Cantàbria (Eclipse FC de Santander), Andalusia (Club Athletic de Sevilla), and Madrid (AD Ferroviaria).

First round

23 March 1924

Eclipse de Santander	4–0	Fortuna de Gijón

Santander
Referee: Ángel Torre
23 March 1924

Terrassa	v	Huesca FC (forfeits)

Terrassa

30 March 1924

Fortuna de Gijón	1–1	Eclipse de Santander

Gijón
Referee: Pablo Saracho
30 March 1924

Huesca FC (forfeits)	v	Terrassa

Osca

Quarter-finals

23 March 1924

Stadium de València	0–4	AD Ferroviaria

Mestalla Stadium, Valencia
Referee: Josep Torrens
23 March 1924

Acero de Bilbao	3–1	Alfonso XIII

Bilbao
Referee: Agustín Cruella
23 March 1924

Osasuna	2–0	Athletic de Sevilla

Pamplona
Referee: Pedro Vallana
6 April 1924

Eclipse de Santander	0–0	Terrassa FC

Santander
Referee: Pelayo Serrano

30 March 1924

AD Ferroviaria	1–1	Stadium de València

Madrid
Referee: Josep Torrens
30 March 1924

Alfonso XIII	3–0	Acero de Bilbao

Pontevedra
Referee: París
30 March 1924

Athletic de Sevilla	1–2	Osasuna

Sevilla
Referee: Francisco Contreras
13 April 1924

Terrassa FC	5–1	Eclipse de Santander

Terrassa
Referee: Antonio Adrados

1 April 1924

Alfonso XIII	1–3	Acero de Bilbao

Camp de Coya, Vigo

Semifinals

6 April 1924

Ferroviaria	3–5	Acero de Bilbao

Madrid
Referee: Augusto Milego
20 April 1924

Terrassa	3–2	Osasuna

Terrassa
Referee: Francisco Contreras

13 April 1924

Acero de Bilbao	2–2	Ferroviaria

Bilbao
Referee: Tomás Balaguer
27 April 1924

Osasuna	3–0	Terrassa

Pamplona
Referee: Fermín Sánchez

29 April 1924

Osasuna	1–0	Terrassa

Atotxa Stadium, San Sebastián
Referee: Fermín Sánchez

Final

4 May 1924

Acero de Bilbao	2–1	Osasuna

Sevilla
Referee: Tomás Balaguer

=== 1925 Championship ===
This edition was contested by the champions of Biscay (Acero Club de Bilbao), Gipuzkoa/Navarra (CD Euskalduna d'Errenteria), Galicia (Alfonso XIII), Asturias (Real Athletic Club de Gijón), Catalonia (Júpiter), Levante (Burjassot CF), Aragon (CD Patria), Cantabria (Racing Club de Reinosa), Andalusia (Málaga), and Madrid (AD Ferroviaria).

Preliminary Phase – Group 1

Team	P	W	D	L	GS	GA	Pts
Júpiter	4	3	0	1	15	2	6
Burjassot CF	4	2	1	1	4	2	5
CD Patria	4	0	1	3	0	15	1

1 March 1925

Burjassot	2–1	Júpiter

Mestalla Stadium, Valencia
8 March 1925

CD Patria	0–0	Burjassot

Zaragoza
15 March 1925

Júpiter	9–0	CD Patria

Barcelona
22 March 1925

Júpiter	1–0	Burjassot

Barcelona
29 March 1925

Burjassot	2–0	CD Patria

Mestalla Stadium, Valencia
5 April 1925

CD Patria	0–4	Júpiter

Zaragoza

Preliminary Phase – Group 2

15 March 1925

Málaga CF	2–3	AD Ferroviaria

Màlaga
5 April 1925

AD Ferroviaria	5–2	Málaga CF

Madrid

Preliminary Phase – Group 3

Team	P	W	D	L	GS	GA	Pts
CD Euskalduna	4	3	0	1	6	5	6
Acero de Bilbao	4	2	0	2	7	5	4
Racing de Reinosa	4	1	0	3	3	6	2

8 March 1925

Euskalduna	1–0	Reinosa

Atotxa Stadium, San Sebastián
15 March 1925

Acero	0–1	Euskalduna

Bilbao
19 March 1925

Reinosa	2–0	Acero

Reinosa
22 March 1925

Reinosa	1–2	Euskalduna

Reinosa
29 March 1925

Euskalduna	2–4	Acero

Atotxa Stadium, San Sebastián
5 April 1925

Acero	3–0	Reinosa

Bilbao

Preliminary Phase – Group 4

8 March 1925

Athletic de Gijón	3–2	Alfonso XIII

Gijón
7 April 1925

Alfonso XIII	7–1	Athletic de Gijón

Pontevedra
12 April 1925

Athletic de Gijón	4–2	Alfonso XIII

Madrid

Semifinals

19 April 1925

AD Ferroviaria	1–1	Júpiter

Madrid
Referee: Cesáreo Ezkurdia
19 April 1925

Athletic de Gijón	7–0	CD Euskalduna

Gijón
Referee: Pelayo Serrano

26 April 1925

Júpiter	2–0	AD Ferroviaria

Barcelona
Referee: Alejandro Quintana
26 April 1925

CD Euskalduna	1–1	Athletic de Gijón

Atotxa Stadium, San Sebastián
Referee: Pelayo Serrano

Final

10 May 1925

Júpiter	4–1	Athletic de Gijón

Mestalla Stadium, Valencia
Referee: Eulogio Aranguren

=== 1926 Championship ===
This edition was contested by the champions of Biscay (Cultural de Durango), Gipuzkoa/Navarra (Pasayako), Galícia (Club Español de Vigo), Asturias (Cimadevilla FC de Gijón), Catalonia (CF Badalona), Valencia (Elche CF), Murcia (Lorca FC), Aragon (Águila FC de Zaragoza), Castile and León (Stadium Salmantino Luises), Cantabria (Barreda SC de Torrelavega), Andalusia (San Román FC de Sevilla), and Madrid (AD Ferroviaria de Madrid).

Preliminary Phase – Group 1

Team	P	W	D	L	GS	GA	Pts
FC Badalona	2	2	0	0	10	1	4
Elche CF	2	1	0	1	4	5	2
Águila FC de Zaragoza	2	0	0	2	1	11	0

28 February 1926

Águila de Zaragoza	0–7	Badalona

Zaragoza
7 March 1926

Badalona	3–1	Elche

Badalona
14 March 1926

Elche	4–1	Águila de Zaragoza

Elche

Elche and Águila withdrew and did not compete in the second round.

Preliminary Phase – Group 2

Team	P	W	D	L	GS	GA	Pts
San Román FC	2	2	0	0	4	2	4
AD Ferroviaria	2	1	0	1	3	3	2
Lorca FC	2	0	0	2	4	6	0

28 February 1926

Ferroviaria	0–1	San Román

Madrid
7 March 1926

San Román	3–2	Lorca

Sevilla
14 March 1926

Lorca	2–3	Ferroviaria

Lorca

Ferroviaria and Lorca withdrew and did not contest the second round.

Preliminary Phase – Group 3

Team	P	W	D	L	GS	GA	Pts
Pasayako LE	4	2	0	2	12	4	4
Cultural de Durango	4	2	0	2	10	5	4
Barreda SC	4	2	0	2	4	17	4

28 February 1926

Cultural	8–1	Barreda

Durango
7 March 1926

Barreda	2–1	Pasayako

Santander
14 March 1926

Pasayako	2–0	Cultural

Pasajes
21 March 1926

Cultural	2–1	Pasayako

Bilbao
28 March 1926

Barreda	1–0	Cultural

Santander
4 April 1926

Pasayako	8–0	Barreda

Pasajes

Barreda SC withdrew and did not compete in the tiebreaker round.

11 April 1926

Pasayako	4–2	Cultural

Santander

Preliminary Phase – Group 4

Stadium Salmantino withdraws from the competition.

14 March 1926

Español de Vigo	3–2	Cimadevilla de Gijón

Vigo
21 March 1926

Cimadevilla de Gijón	6–1	Español de Vigo

Gijón

4 April 1926

Cimadevilla de Gijón	3–2	Español de Vigo

León

Semifinals

18 April 1926

Pasayako	4–2	Cimadevilla

Pasajes
18 April 1926

Badalona	v	San Román (forfeits)

Badalona

25 April 1926

Cimadevilla	3–1	Pasayako

Gijón

2 May 1926

Pasayako	3–2	Cimadevilla

Santander
Referee: Real

Final

16 May 1926

Pasayako	2–2	Badalona

Estadi de Torrero, Zaragoza
Referee: Díez de Cenzano

18 May 1926

Pasayako	1–0 (Note: Tie-breaker. With a scoreless draw in regulation time, a 30-minute extra time was played.)	Badalona

Estadi de Torrero, Zaragoza
Referee: Antonio Adrados
