= Fernando Ponte Conde =

Spanish sports leader

- Born: 1907; Vigo, Pontevedra, Spain
- Died: 10 June 1978 (aged 71); Spain
- Citizenship: Spanish
- Known for: First president of Pontevedra CF

1st President of Pontevedra CF
- In office 1941–1942
- Succeeded by: Manuel Fernández Torres

4th President of Pontevedra CF
- In office 1949–1951
- Preceded by: Manuel García Lastra
- Succeeded by: Antonio Puig Gaite

Fernando Ponte Conde (1907 – 10 June 1978) was a Spanish sports leader who served as the first president of Pontevedra CF between 1941 and 1942.

== Early life and education ==
Born in 1907 in Vigo, Pontevedra, Fernando Ponte Conde studied at the Instituto Cardenal Cisneros in Madrid between 1920 and 1922, and in the following year, he earned his bachelor's degree.

== Pontevedra CF ==
On 16 October 1941, the two top teams in Pontevedra, Eiriña CF and Alfonso XIII CF, which had been hindered by the Spanish Civil War, decided to join forces and merge into a single entity that was capable of representing the city with the proper support: Pontevedra Club de Fútbol, and Ponte Conde was elected as its first president. Eiriña's secretary, José Soto Martínez, was an officer of the prison corps, and thus he knew that, in order to avoid arising suspicions in the others, the president had to be someone from Alfonso, with Ponte being the most suitable for this position. The paperwork that officially established the club was held in Las Palmeras because Ponte, who was already set to be the first president, was a colonel and had his office there.

Pontevedra CF made its official debut just two months later, on 28 December, in a friendly against Celta de Vigo at the Pasarón, which ended in a 3–3 home draw. During his first presidency, the club quickly became the best in the city, dominating the lower categories of Galician football until they won the Galician Championship in Ourense in 1942.

== Death ==
Ponte Conde died on 10 June 1978, at the age of 71. One of his great-grandsons, José Corrochano, was a member of Pontevedra CF in 2018.
