= Renzo =

Renzo, the diminutive of Lorenzo, is an Italian masculine given name and a surname.

== Given name ==
Notable people named Renzo include the following:

- Renzo Alverà (1933–2005), Italian bobsledder
- Renzo Arbore (born 1937), Italian TV host, showman, singer, musician, film actor, and film director
- Renzo Barbieri (1940–2007), Italian author and editor of Italian comics
- Renzo Caldara (born 1943), Italian bobsledder
- Renzo Cesana (1907–1970), Italian-American actor, writer, composer, and songwriter
- Renzo Cramerotti (born 1947), Italian male javelin thrower
- Renzo Dalmazzo (1886–1959), Italian lieutenant general
- Renzo De Felice (1929–1996), Italian historian
- Renzo De Vecchi (1894–1967), Italian football player and coach
- Renzo "Larry" Di Ianni (born 1948), Italian-Canadian politician
- Renzo Fenci (1914–1999), Italian-American sculptor based in Southern California.
- Renzo Furlan (born 1970), Italian tennis player
- Renzo Gobbo (born 1961), Italian association football manager and player
- Renzo Gracie (born 1967), Brazilian mixed martial artist
- Renzo Imbeni (1944–2005), Italian politician
- Renzo Marangon (born 1955), Italian politician
- Renzo Montagnani (1930–1997), Italian film and theatre actor and dubber
- Renzo Morigi (1895–1962), Italian pistol sports shooter
- Renzo Novatore (1890–1922), Italian individualist anarchist, Futurist, militant, philosopher and poet
- Renzo Olivo (born 1992), Argentine tennis player
- Renzo Palmer (1929–1988), Italian film, television and stage actor
- Renzo Pasolini (1938–1973), Italian motorcycle road racer
- Renzo Pezzani (1898–1951), Italian poet
- Renzo Piano (born 1937), Italian architect
- Renzo Provinciali (1895–1981), Italian lawyer, anarchist, Futurist and journalist
- Renzo Rabellino (born 1958), Italian politician
- Renzo Reggiardo (born 1972), Peruvian politician
- Renzo Revoredo (born 1986), Peruvian footballer
- Renzo Rossellini (1908–1982), Italian composer
- Renzo Rossellini (born 1941), Italian film producer
- Renzo Rosso (born 1955), Italian fashion entrepreneur
- Renzo Sambo (1942–2009), Italian competition rower
- Renzo Saravia (born 1993), Argentinian footballer
- Renzo Sheput (born 1980), Peruvian footballer
- Renzo Spiteri (born ?), Maltese musician
- Renzo Ulivieri (born 1941), Italian association football manager
- Renzo Vecchiato (born 1955), Italian basketball player
- Renzo Vespignani (1924–2001), Italian painter, printmaker and illustrator
- Renzo Yáñez (born 1980), Chilean footballer
- Renzo Vestrini (1906–1976), Italian painter, olympic rower and engineer
- Renzo Zorzi (1946–2015), Italian racing driver
- Renzo Fabian

== Surname ==
- Joe DeRenzo (born 1958), American jazz drummer, composer and producer
- Patrizio Di Renzo (born 1971), Swiss photographer and director
- Jordan Renzo (born 1993), British-born actor

== Fictional characters ==
- Samuel Renzo, from the video game TimeSplitters: Future Perfect
- Renzo Tramaglino, from the novel The Betrothed by Alessandro Manzoni
