= 1932–33 Campionat de Catalunya =

Campionat de Catalunya
- Season: 1932–33
- Champions: Espanyol
- Relegated: Sants; Martinenc
- Matches: 56
- Goals: 220 (3.93 per match)
- Top goalscorer: José Garreta (19 goals)
- Biggest home win: Barcelona 7–1 Sabadell (28 August 1932)
- Biggest away win: Martinenc 0–5 Espanyol (11 September 1932)
- Highest scoring: Barcelona 7–1 Sabadell (28 August 1932); Martinenc 4–4 Júpiter (4 September 1932)

The 1932–33 Campionat de Catalunya season was the 34th since its establishment and was played between 28 August and 8 December 1932.

== Overview before the season ==
Eight teams joined the Division One league, including two that would play the 1932–33 La Liga and six from the 1932–33 Tercera División.

From La Liga

- Barcelona
- Espanyol

From Tercera División

- Badalona
- Júpiter
- Martinenc
- Palafrugell
- Sabadell
- Sants

== Division One ==
=== League table ===
Pos	Team	Pld	W	D	L	GF	GA	GD	Pts	Qualification or relegation
1	Espanyol (Note: Head-to-head results: Espanyol 3–2 Barcelona; Barcelona 1–1 Espanyol.) (C)	14	12	1	1	43	14	+29	25	Qualification for Copa del Rey
2	Barcelona	14	12	1	1	53	15	+38	25	Qualification for Copa del Rey
3	Palafrugell	14	7	1	6	28	29	−1	15	Qualification for Copa del Rey
4	Júpiter	14	5	3	6	24	29	−5	13	
5	Sabadell	14	5	1	8	23	33	−10	11	
6	Sants (R)	14	3	4	7	18	28	−10	10	Qualification for the play-off league
7	Martinenc (R)	14	3	3	8	18	39	−21	9	Qualification for the play-off league
8	Badalona (O)	14	0	4	10	13	33	−20	4	Qualification for the play-off league

Source: BDFútbol
Rules for classification: 1) points; 2) head-to-head points; 3) head-to-head goal difference; 4) goal difference; 5) number of goals scored
(C) Champions; (O) Play-off winners; (R) Relegated

=== Results ===
Home \ Away	BAD	FCB	ESP	JUP	MAR	PAL	SAB	STS
Badalona	—	1–5	1–3	2–3	0–1	0–1	1–1	1–1
Barcelona	4–2	—	1–1	3–0	5–0	3–1	7–1	5–1
Espanyol	2–0	3–2	—	3–1	4–0	6–1	2–0	4–0
Júpiter	2–1	1–3	2–3	—	1–0	2–1	0–1	2–2
Martinenc	2–2	1–5	0–5	4–4	—	1–3	5–2	1–1
Palafrugell	1–1	2–4	3–1	4–2	1–2	—	4–2	2–1
Sabadell	3–1	0–2	1–2	2–4	3–1	4–2	—	3–0
Sants	4–0	1–4	2–4	0–0	3–0	0–2	2–0	—

Source: BDFútbol
Legend: Blue = home team win; Yellow = draw; Red = away team win.

=== Top goalscorers ===
Goalscorers	Goals	Team
(Spain) José Garreta	19	Espanyol
(Spain) Ángel Arocha	14	Barcelona
(Spain) Josep Samitier	10	Barcelona
(Spain) Edelmiro Lorenzo	8	Espanyol
(Spain) Severiano Goiburu	7	Barcelona

== Play-off league ==
Pos	Team	Pld	W	D	L	GF	GA	GD	Pts	Qualification or relegation
1	Girona (C, P)	14	9	1	4	31	17	+14	19	Play-off winners
2	Granollers (P)	14	8	2	4	27	20	+7	18	Play-off winners
3	Badalona	14	8	2	4	50	27	+23	18	Play-off winners
4	Sants	14	6	3	5	23	16	+7	15	
5	Iluro	14	6	1	7	27	28	−1	13	
6	Manresa	14	5	2	7	17	38	−21	11	
7	Reus	14	5	0	9	18	36	−18	10	
8	Martinenc	14	3	1	10	23	34	−11	7	

Source: BDFútbol
Rules for classification: 1) points; 2) head-to-head points; 3) head-to-head goal difference; 4) goal difference; 5) number of goals scored
(C) Champions; (P) Promoted

== Division Two ==
=== Group A ===
Pos	Team	Pld	W	D	L	GF	GA	GD	Pts	Qualification or relegation
1	Santboià	14	7	5	2	27	15	+12	19	Qualification for the final group
2	Reus	14	7	2	5	25	21	+4	16	Qualification for the final group
3	Gimnàstic Tarragona	14	7	2	5	25	20	+5	16	Qualification for the final group
4	Horta	14	6	3	5	20	20	0	15	Qualification for the final group
5	Sant Andreu	14	5	4	5	23	18	+5	14	
6	Güell	14	4	3	7	15	23	−8	11	
7	Vilafranca	14	4	3	7	23	34	−11	11	
8	Mollet	14	3	4	7	16	23	−7	10	

Source: BDFútbol
Rules for classification: 1) points; 2) head-to-head points; 3) head-to-head goal difference; 4) goal difference; 5) number of goals scored

=== Group B ===
Pos	Team	Pld	W	D	L	GF	GA	GD	Pts	Qualification or relegation
1	Girona	14	8	2	4	44	19	+25	18	Qualification for the final group
2	Iluro	14	8	2	4	33	23	+10	18	Qualification for the final group
3	Manresa	14	7	2	5	32	28	+4	16	Qualification for the final group
4	Granollers	14	7	1	6	35	27	+8	15	Qualification for the final group
5	Ripollet	14	6	2	6	25	32	−7	14	
6	Terrassa	14	5	4	5	33	22	+11	14	
7	Atlètic Sabadell	14	5	0	9	18	49	−31	10	
8	Sant Cugat	14	3	1	10	19	39	−20	7	

Source: BDFútbol
Rules for classification: 1) points; 2) head-to-head points; 3) head-to-head goal difference; 4) goal difference; 5) number of goals scored

=== Final group ===
Pos	Team	Pld	W	D	L	GF	GA	GD	Pts	Qualification or relegation
1	Granollers	8	7	0	1	17	6	+11	14	Qualification for the play-off league
2	Iluro	8	7	0	1	22	6	+16	14	Qualification for the play-off league
3	Manresa	8	5	0	3	17	14	+3	10	Qualification for the play-off league
4	Girona	8	5	0	3	24	10	+14	10	Qualification for the play-off league
5	Reus	8	3	0	5	11	24	−13	6	Qualification for the play-off league
6	Santboià	8	3	0	5	11	17	−6	6	
7	Gimnàstic Tarragona	8	1	0	7	12	19	−7	2	
8	Horta	8	1	0	7	12	30	−18	2	

Source: BDFútbol
Rules for classification: 1) points; 2) head-to-head points; 3) head-to-head goal difference; 4) goal difference; 5) number of goals scored
