= Manuel Garriga =

Manuel Garriga may refer to:

- Manuel Garriga (French footballer) (1926–1980)
- Manuel Garriga (Spanish footballer) (1928–2019)
