= Edelmiro Lorenzo =

Spanish footballer and manager

Personal information
- Full name: Edelmiro Lorenzo Codesido
- Date of birth: 20 July 1910
- Place of birth: Pontevedra, Spain
- Date of death: 22 October 1997 (aged 87)
- Place of death: Pontevedra, Spain
- Position: Forward

Senior career*
Years	Team	Apps	(Gls)
1925	Eiriña		
1925–1930	Iberia de La Habana		
1930–1936	Espanyol	102	(42)
1936–1937	Eiriña		
1938–1940	Racing de Ferrol		
1943–1945	Pontevedra		

International career
Late 1920s	Cuba	1	(0)
1931	Catalonia	5	(1)

Managerial career
- 1943–1944: Pontevedra
- 1947–1950: Arosa
- * Club domestic league appearances and goals

Edelmiro Lorenzo Codesido (20 July 1910 – 22 October 1997) was a Spanish footballer who played as a forward for Espanyol in the 1930s. He also played one match for Cuba, and five for Catalonia.

After retiring, he worked as a manager in the late 1940s. His twin brother O'Donell also played for Espanyol, and his younger brother Gonzalo played for Celta de Vigo.

== Playing career ==
=== Club career ===
Born on 20 July 1910 in Pontevedra, Edelmiro began playing football with his twin brother O'Donell and his younger Gonzalo on the banks of the Lérez River in Pontevedra and later in some local neighborhood teams. In the mid-1920s, the brothers joined local club Eiriña, which had been founded just two years earlier, and after being invited by some boys from Vilagarcía, in 1922, they emigrated to Cuba to play for Iberia de La Habana, where they formed a powerful attacking trio, which played a crucial role in helping Iberia win three national championships in 1926, 1928, and 1929. While there, Edelmiro was granted dual Spanish-Cuban nationality and even earned one international cap for the Cuban national team.

When they returned to Spain in 1930, Edelmiro joined Espanyol, where he quickly established himself as one of the best strikers in the country, as he reached double-digit figures in La Liga in each of his first two seasons at the club: In 1930–31 with 11 goals and 1931–32 with 10 goals. He remained loyal to the club for six years, from 1930 until 1936, scoring a total of 98 goals in 193 official matches, including 42 goals in 102 La Liga matches. His goalscoring prowess was the driving force behind the Espanyol team that won the Catalan championship in 1932–33 and which then achieved their best-ever La Liga result in 1933, a third-place finish, a feat that has never been surpassed. In 1933, his twin brother also joined Espanyol, and in the round of 16 of the 1934 Copa del Presidente de la República, he and his twin brother had the chance to play against their younger Gonzalo, then in Celta de Vigo, which lost to Espanyol 4–5 on aggregate. During his time at Espanyol, O'Donell was known as Edelmiro II.

When the Spanish Civil War broke out in 1936, Edelmiro returned to Eiriña, and in October 1938, he signed for Racing de Ferrol, where he played a pivotal role, together with the likes of Bertolí, Lelé, and Ricardo Gallart under coach José Planas, in helping the team win the 1939 Galicia Championship and then reach the final of the 1939 Copa del Generalísimo on 25 June, which ended in a 6–2 loss to Sevilla. A few months later, on 5 November, Edelmiro started in the final of the final edition of the Galicia Championship, which ended in a 1–0 loss to Deportivo de La Coruña. He then played his last football at Pontevedra, where he retired in 1945, aged 35.

=== International career ===
Like so many other Espanyol players, Lorenzo was eligible to play for the Catalonia national team, making five appearances for them. He played his first two matches for Catalonia on 28 and 29 June 1931, scoring in the former to help his side to a 4–1 win. In the following month, on 25 July, he played against Gimnástico at Estadio de Vallejo, helping his side to a 2–1 win.

== Managerial career ==
After his career as a player ended, Lorenzo remained linked to Pontevedra, now as a coach, which he oversaw in the 1943–44 season. After a short hiatus, he was appointed as the coach of Arosa in 1947, a position that he held for three years, until 1950.

== Death ==
Edelmiro died in Pontevedra on 22 October 1997, at the age of 87.

== Honours ==
Iberia

- Cuba national championship
  - Champions (3): 1926, 1928, and 1929

RCD Espanyol

- Catalan championship
  - Champions (1): 1932–33

Racing de Ferrol

- Galicia Championship:
  - Champions (1): 1938–39
- Copa del Rey:
  - Runner-up (1): 1939

== See also ==
- List of La Liga hat-tricks
