= Juanra =

Juanra is a Spanish nickname that is short for "Juan Ramón". Notable people include:

- Juanra Bonet (born 1974), Spanish television presenter
- Juanra (footballer, born 1980), Spanish football right-back Juan Ramón Cabrero Obrer
- Juanra (footballer, born 1995), Spanish football right-back Juan Ramón Gómez-Pimpollo López
- Juanra (futsal player) (born 1982), Spanish futsal midfielder Juan Ramón Calvo Rodríguez
