= 1995 Copa América final =

- Event: 1995 Copa América
Uruguay	Brazil
(Uruguay)	(Brazil)
1	1
- Uruguay won 5–3 on penalties
- Date: 23 July 1995
- Venue: Estadio Centenario, Montevideo
- Referee: Arturo Brizio Carter (Mexico)
- Attendance: 60,000

The 1995 Copa América final was the final match of the 1995 Copa América. It was held on July 23, 1995, in Montevideo, Uruguay. This was the fourth final for both Uruguay and reigning World Champion Brazil, and the third final featuring the two teams; previously Uruguay had defeated Brazil in 1983, with Brazil returning the favor in 1989 at the Estádio do Maracanã.

Uruguay won the match 5–3 on penalties, continuing its historic run of winning every international tournament held in Uruguay. This remarkable streak includes South American Championships victories in 1917, 1923, 1924, 1942, 1956, and 1967, and the 1930 FIFA World Cup.

By winning the 1995 Copa América tournament, Uruguay qualified for the 1997 FIFA Confederations Cup.

== Route to the final ==
Uruguay
Round
Brazil
Opponent
Result
Group stage
Opponent
Result
Venezuela
4–1
Match 1
Ecuador
1–0
Paraguay
1–0
Match 2
Peru
2–0
Mexico
1–1
Match 3
Colombia
3–0
Group A winner

Team	Pld	W	D	L	GF	GA	GD	Pts
Uruguay	3	2	1	0	6	2	+4	7
Paraguay	3	2	0	1	5	4	+1	6
Mexico	3	1	1	1	5	4	+1	4
Venezuela	3	0	0	3	4	10	−6	0

Final standings
Group B winner

Team	Pld	W	D	L	GF	GA	GD	Pts
Brazil	3	3	0	0	6	0	+6	9
Colombia	3	1	1	1	2	4	−2	4
Ecuador	3	1	0	2	2	3	−1	3
Peru	3	0	1	2	2	5	−3	1

Opponent
Result
Knockout stage
Opponent
Result
Bolivia
2–1
Quarter-finals
Argentina
2–2 (4–2 p)
Colombia
2–0
Semi-finals
United States
1–0

== Match details ==
23 July 1995
17:10 (UTC-3)

Uruguay	1–1	Brazil
Bengoechea 51'	Report	Túlio 30'
Penalties
Francescoli (penalty scored); Bengoechea (penalty scored); Herrera (penalty scored); Gutiérrez (penalty scored); Martínez (penalty scored)	5–3	(penalty scored) Roberto Carlos; (penalty scored) Zinho; (penalty missed) Túlio; (penalty scored) Dunga

Estadio Centenario, Montevideo
Attendance: 60,000
Referee: Arturo Brizio Carter (Mexico)

Uruguay	Brazil

GK	1	Fernando Álvez
RB	14	Gustavo Méndez	(yellow card) 86'
CB	4	José Herrera	(yellow card) 5'
CB	3	Eber Moas
LB	18	Tabaré Silva		(substituted off) 35'
CM	5	Álvaro Gutiérrez
CM	21	Diego Dorta		(substituted off) 46'
RW	9	Daniel Fonseca		(substituted off) 46'
AM	11	Gus Poyet	(yellow card) 60'
LW	7	Marcelo Otero
CF	10	Enzo Francescoli (c)
Substitutions:
DF	6	Edgardo Adinolfi		(substituted on) 35'
MF	8	Pablo Bengoechea		(substituted on) 46'
FW	17	Sergio Martínez		(substituted on) 46'
Manager:
Héctor Núñez

GK	1	Cláudio Taffarel
RB	2	Jorginho
CB	3	Aldair
CB	14	André Cruz
LB	6	Roberto Carlos	(yellow card) 5'
DM	8	Dunga (c)	(yellow card) 90'
DM	5	César Sampaio
AM	10	Juninho Paulista	(yellow card) 67'	(substituted off) 78'
AM	11	Zinho	(yellow card) 33'
SS	7	Edmundo
CF	9	Túlio
Substitutions:
MF	17	Beto		(substituted on) 78'
Manager:
Mário Zagallo

OFFICIALS

- Assistant referees:
  - Bommer Fierro (Ecuador)
  - Adrián Gómez (Venezuela)

MATCH RULES

- 90 minutes
- Penalty shoot-out if scores still level:
- 3 (of 12) substitutions permitted
