= Lorenzen =

Lorenzen may refer to

== People ==
- Lorenzen (surname)
- Lorenzen Wright, American basketball player

== Places ==
=== Austria ===
- Sankt Lorenz, Upper Austria
- Sankt Lorenzen am Wechsel, Styria
- Sankt Lorenzen bei Knittelfeld, Styria
- Sankt Lorenzen bei Scheifling, Styria
- Sankt Lorenzen im Mürztal, Styria

=== Italy ===
- St. Lorenzen South Tyrol

=== United States ===
- Lorenzen, Mississippi, an unincorporated community

== Other ==
- Lorenzen Group, paramilitary group of Danish collaborators, active 1944-1945
- USNS Howard O. Lorenzen, American missile range instrumentation ship

== See also ==
- Lorenzo (disambiguation)
