= De Lorenzi =

De Lorenzi is a surname. Notable people with the surname include:

- Christian De Lorenzi (born 1981), Italian biathlete
- Gianluca de Lorenzi (born 1972), Italian auto racing driver
- Marie-Laure de Lorenzi (born 1961), French professional golfer

== See also ==
- De Lorenzo
