= O'Donell Lorenzo =

Spanish footballer (1910–1979)

Personal information
- Full name: O'Donell Lorenzo Codesido
- Date of birth: 20 July 1910
- Place of birth: Pontevedra, Spain
- Date of death: 14 September 1979 (aged 69)
- Place of death: Spain
- Position: Forward

Senior career*
Years	Team	Apps	(Gls)
1925	Eiriña		
1925–1930	Iberia de La Habana		
1933–1935	Espanyol	21	(7)
1935–1936	Levante		
1936–1938	Eiriña		
1939–1940	Celta de Vigo	3	(0)
1940–1941	Alfonso XIII		
1941–1942	Vigués		
Total		24	(7)
- * Club domestic league appearances and goals

O'Donell Lorenzo Codesido, better known as O'Donell (20 July 1910 – 14 September 1979), was a Spanish footballer who played as a forward for Espanyol in the 1930s.

== Early life ==
Born on 20 July 1910 in Pontevedra, O'Donell began playing football with his twin brother Edelmiro and his younger brother Gonzalo on the banks of the Lérez River in Pontevedra and later in some local neighborhood teams.

== Career ==
In the mid-1920s, the brothers joined local club Eiriña, which had been founded just a few earlier, in 1922, and after being invited by some boys from Vilagarcía, they emigrated to Cuba to play for Iberia de La Habana, where they formed a powerful attacking trio, which played a crucial role in helping Iberia win three national championships in 1926, 1928, and 1929. Even though his brothers returned to Spain in 1930, O'Donell decided to stay in Cuba, and in December 1931, he embarked on a tour of Mexico with Iberia, which was reinforced with Coruña natives, such as Manuel Chorens. In June 1930, he boarded the 'SS Maasdam' from the port of Rotterdam.

O'Donell played for Iberia until July 1933, when he returned to Spain to sign for Espanyol, where he coincided with his twin brother Edelmiro, thus becoming known as Edelmiro II. He remained at the club for two years, from 1933 until 1935, scoring a total of 11 goals in 37 official matches, including 7 goals in 21 La Liga matches. Notably, in the round of 16 of the 1934 Copa del Rey, he and his twin brother had the chance to play against their younger brother Gonzalo, then in Celta de Vigo, which lost to Espanyol 4–5 on aggregate.

When the Spanish Civil War broke out in 1936, O'Donell returned to Eiriña, where he once again coincided with his brother Edelmiro, and in late 1939, he was among the several players from Eiriña that was signed by Celta de Vigo for their upcoming debut in the top-flight. Even though he started in the club's first-ever La Liga match on 3 December 1939, which ended in a 3–2 loss to Real Zaragoza, he went on to only play three league match for Celta that season, plus two more in the Copa del Rey for a total of five, all of which away, thus never playing at Balaídos with the Celta shirt.

O'Donell then played one season at both Alfonso XIII (1940–41) and Vigués (1941–42).

== Later life and death ==
After retiring from football, O'Donell, along with his twin brother Edelmiro, ran a watchmaking business in Pontevedra.

O'Donell died on 14 September 1979, at the age of 69.

== Honours ==
Iberia

- Cuba national championship
  - Champions (3): 1926, 1928, and 1929
