= Salustiano =

Salustiano is a surname and a given name. Notable people with the name include:

Given name:

- Salustiano de Olózaga y Almandoz (1805–1873), Spanish politician, diplomat, Prime Minister of Spain
- Salustiano Jerônimo dos Reis, Baron of Camaquã, Brazilian Marshal
- Salustiano Candia (born 1983), Paraguayan footballer
- Salustiano Contreras, Cuban baseball infielder
- Salustiano Santos (1918–1995), Spanish footballer
- Salustiano Paco Varela (1914–1987), Argentine tango bandoneonist, bandleader and composer

Surname:

- Matheus Salustiano (born 1993), Brazilian footballer
