= 1931–32 Tercera División =

Tercera División
- Season: 1931–32
- Promoted: Osasuna
- Matches played: 94
- Goals scored: 324 (3.45 per match)
- Biggest home win: Levante 10–0 Saguntino (21 February 1932)
- Biggest away win: Mallorca 0–4 Júpiter (20 December 1931)
- Highest scoring: Levante 10–0 Saguntino (21 February 1932)

== Group 1 ==
=== League table ===
Pos	Team	Pld	W	D	L	GF	GA	GD	Pts	Qualification or relegation
1	Racing Ferrol	6	4	1	1	16	8	+8	9	Qualification for the promotion play-off
2	Eiriña	6	3	1	2	9	11	−2	7	
3	Stadium Avilesino	6	1	2	3	10	12	−2	4 (Note: Stadium Avilesino finished ahead of Valladolid on head-to-head goal difference: Stadium Avilesino–Valladolid 5–1, Valladolid–Stadium Avilesino 1–0)	
4	Valladolid	6	2	0	4	8	12	−4	4	
5	Cultural Leonesa (Note: Retired of the competition)	0	0	0	0	0	0	0	0	Retired

Source: AREFE
Rules for classification: 1) points; 2) head-to-head points; 3) head-to-head goal difference; 4) goal difference; 5) number of goals scored

== Group 2 ==
=== League table ===
Pos	Team	Pld	W	D	L	GF	GA	GD	Pts	Qualification or relegation
1	Osasuna	8	6	2	0	20	5	+15	14	Qualification for the promotion play-off
2	Barakaldo	8	4	2	2	16	11	+5	10	
3	Erandio	8	2	3	3	12	11	+1	7	
4	Logroño	8	2	2	4	8	13	−5	6	
5	Atlético Aurora	8	1	1	6	7	23	−16	3	

Source: AREFE
Rules for classification: 1) points; 2) head-to-head points; 3) head-to-head goal difference; 4) goal difference; 5) number of goals scored

== Group 3 ==
=== Group 3–A ===
==== League table ====
Pos	Team	Pld	W	D	L	GF	GA	GD	Pts	Qualification or relegation
1	Sabadell	10	6	1	3	22	12	+10	13	Qualification for the group finals
2	Martinenc	10	4	3	3	21	19	+2	11 (Note: Martinenc finished ahead of Badalona on number of goals scored)	
3	Badalona	10	4	3	3	18	16	+2	11	
4	Mallorca	10	4	2	4	13	16	−3	10	
5	Iberia	10	3	2	5	9	16	−7	8	
6	Júpiter	10	3	1	6	12	16	−4	7	

Source: AREFE
Rules for classification: 1) points; 2) head-to-head points; 3) head-to-head goal difference; 4) goal difference; 5) number of goals scored

=== Group 3–B ===
==== League table ====
Pos	Team	Pld	W	D	L	GF	GA	GD	Pts	Qualification or relegation
1	Levante	4	3	0	1	20	5	+15	6	Qualification for the group finals
2	Atlético Saguntino	4	2	0	2	5	14	−9	4	
3	Gimnástico Valencia	4	1	0	3	4	10	−6	2	

Source: AREFE
Rules for classification: 1) points; 2) head-to-head points; 3) head-to-head goal difference; 4) goal difference; 5) number of goals scored

=== Group 3–Finals ===
Team 1	Agg.	Team 2	1st leg	2nd leg
Levante	1–5	Sabadell	1–1	0–4

== Group 4 ==
=== Group 4–A ===
==== League table ====
Pos	Team	Pld	W	D	L	GF	GA	GD	Pts	Qualification or relegation
1	Hércules	8	5	1	2	22	10	+12	11	Qualification for the group finals
2	Cartagena	8	5	0	3	24	16	+8	10	
3	Alicante	8	4	0	4	12	21	−9	8 (Note: Alicante finished ahead of Imperial Murcia on head-to-head goal difference: Imperial Murcia–Alicante 4–3, Alicante–Imperial Murcia 2–0)	
4	Imperial Murcia	8	4	0	4	12	18	−6	8	
5	Elche	8	1	1	6	10	15	−5	3	

Source: AREFE
Rules for classification: 1) points; 2) head-to-head points; 3) head-to-head goal difference; 4) goal difference; 5) number of goals scored

=== Group 4–B ===
==== League table ====
Pos	Team	Pld	W	D	L	GF	GA	GD	Pts	Qualification or relegation
1	Nacional Madrid	4	2	1	1	6	4	+2	5 (Note: Nacional Madrid finished ahead of Racing Córdoba after a tiebreaker game: Nacional Madrid–Racing Córdoba 2–1)	Qualification for the group finals
2	Racing Córdoba	4	2	1	1	6	4	+2	5	
3	Malagueño	4	0	2	2	2	6	−4	2	

Source: AREFE
Rules for classification: 1) points; 2) head-to-head points; 3) head-to-head goal difference; 4) goal difference; 5) number of goals scored

=== Group 4–Finals ===
Team 1	Agg.	Team 2	1st leg	2nd leg
Hércules	3–6	Nacional Madrid	1–1	2–5

== Promotion play-off ==
=== Semi-finals ===
Team 1	Agg.	Team 2	1st leg	2nd leg
Sabadell	2–4	Osasuna	2–1	0–3
Nacional Madrid	5–5	Racing Ferrol	4–2	1–3

==== Tiebreaker ====
Team 1	Score	Team 2
Nacional Madrid	1–0	Racing Ferrol

=== Finals ===
Team 1	Agg.	Team 2	1st leg	2nd leg
Osasuna	4–0	Nacional Madrid	3–0	1–0
