= Pirelo =

Mexican footballer and manager

Personal information
- Full name: Daniel Díaz de León Castillo
- Date of birth: 8 February 1910
- Place of birth: Chihuahua City, Mexico
- Date of death: 1 January 2006 (aged 95)
- Position: Midfielder

Senior career*
Years	Team	Apps	(Gls)
1928–1933	Eiriña CF		
1933–1942	Celta de Vigo		
1943–1944	Pontevedra CF		

Managerial career
- 1948–1949: Pontevedra CF
- * Club domestic league appearances and goals

Daniel Díaz de León Castillo, better known as Pirelo (8 February 1910 – 1 January 2006), was a Mexican footballer who played as a midfielder for Spanish club Celta de Vigo. He was also a manager.

== Club career ==
Pirelo was born in Chihuahua City, Mexico, to Spanish parents, and when he was young, his family moved to Galicia, where he began playing football for Eiriña CF, with whom he played three seasons of the Tercera División (1929–30, 1931–32, and 1932–33), and was the Galician amateur champion in 1932–33. His performances eventually drew the attention of Celta de Vigo, then in the Segunda División, who signed him in 1933, thus becoming the first Mexican footballer in the club's history. In his first season at the club, he helped the team win the Galician Championship. In total, Díaz de León scored 8 goals in 30 games in two seasons for Celta before leaving in 1935, returning to Eiriña CF. After the Spanish Civil War, Celta returned to the official competition, and in order to do so in the First Division, it was required the renewal of a squad that had been devastated by the war and the break. Among other signings, Celta carried out a series of negotiations with Eiriña for the signing of several footballers, among whom was the Mexican Pirelo. In gratitude for the magnificent disposition of the Pontevedra team, Celta played a free match in their field, in which Pirelo occupied the midfielder position.

Pirelo thus made his La Liga debut in the first league match of the 1939–40 edition, which was also Celta's debut in the Spanish first division, which ended in a 3–2 loss to Zaragoza on 3 December 1939. In doing so, he became one of the first Mexican footballers to play in La Liga. In Celta's first year in the first team, Pirelo was practically undisputed, playing 19 games out of 22, at a time when substitutions did not exist. In the second campaign, he was also quite complete, but with the arrival of reinforcements, mainly the Canaries, he lost prominence, and in its last year (1941–42), he only played four games. In total, he played 62 matches for Celta, scoring 8 goals.

== Managerial career ==
On 23 April 1941, Pirelo had the honor of forming the Celta eleven that defeated Deportivo de La Coruña 8–0 in Balaidos in the second leg of the round of 32 of the 1941 Spanish Cup; Celta went on to reach the semifinals after beating Real Madrid in the round of 16 and Real Oviedo in the quarterfinals. He also managed Pontevedra CF in the 1948–49 season.

== Honours ==
Celta de Vigo

Galician Championship:

- Winners (1) 1933–34
