= Pablo Bengoechea =

Uruguayan footballer and manager (born 1965)

Pablo Bengoechea Camelo
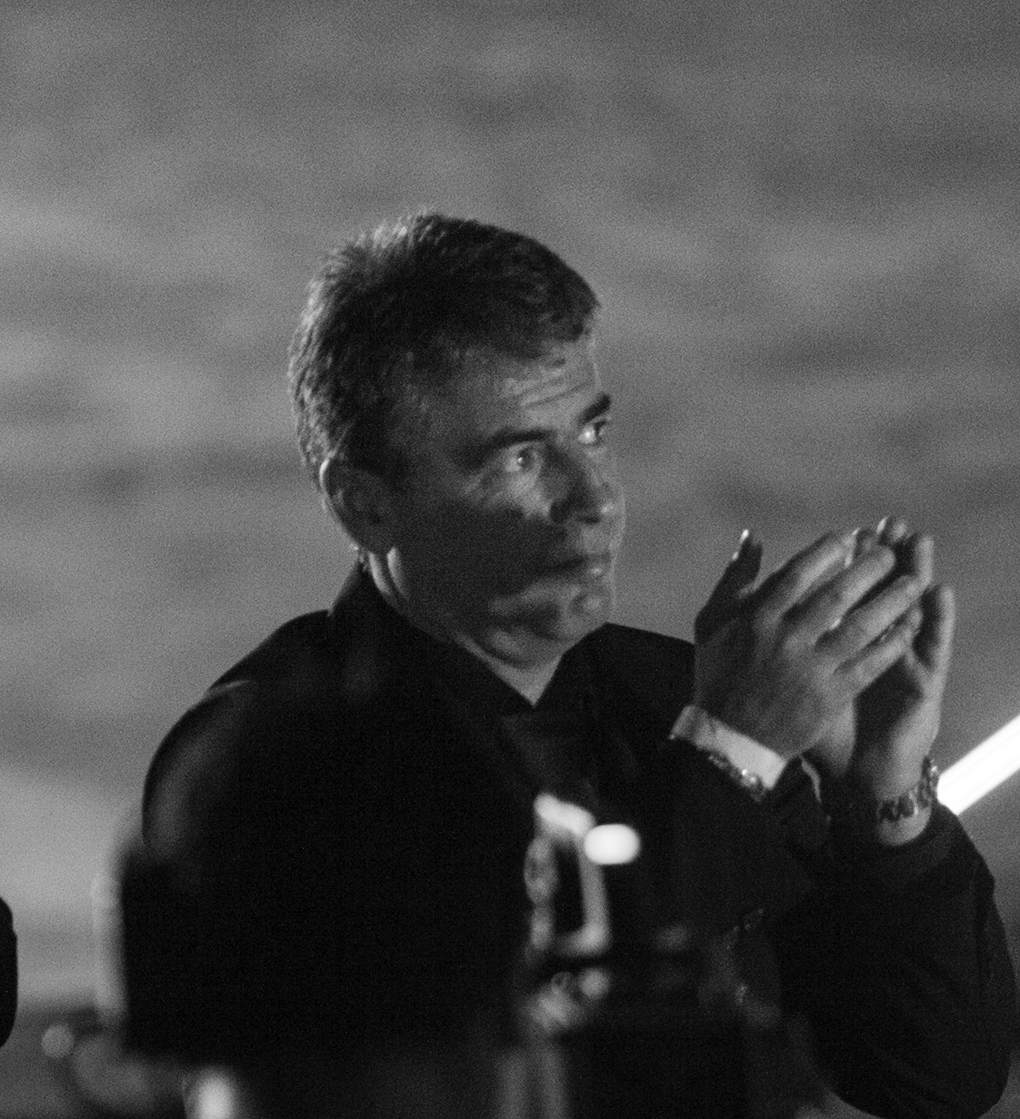
- Bengoechea in 2016

Personal information
- Full name: Pablo Javier Bengoechea Dutra
- Date of birth: 27 June 1965 (age 61)
- Place of birth: Rivera, Uruguay
- Height: 1.74 m (5 ft 9 in)
- Position: Midfielder

Team information
- Current team: Comerciantes (manager)

Senior career*
Years	Team	Apps	(Gls)
1985–1987	Montevideo Wanderers	46	(15)
1987–1992	Sevilla	135	(26)
1992–1993	Gimnasia La Plata	16	(5)
1993–2003	Peñarol	245	(82)
Total		442	(128)

International career
1986–1997	Uruguay	43	(6)

Managerial career
- 2005–2006: River Plate (assistant)
- 2007–2008: Cruz Azul (assistant)
- 2008–2009: Universidad de Chile (assistant)
- 2010: Danubio (assistant)
- 2010–2014: Peru (assistant)
- 2014: Peru
- 2015–2016: Peñarol
- 2017–2018: Alianza Lima
- 2019–2020: Alianza Lima
- 2026–: Comerciantes
Medal record
Representing Uruguay
Copa América
Winner	1987 Argentina
Winner	1995 Uruguay
Runner-up	1989 Brazil
- * Club domestic league appearances and goals

Pablo Javier Bengoechea Dutra (born 27 June 1965) is a Uruguayan former professional footballer, who is currently a manager. He is the current manager of Peruvian club Comerciantes.

A midfielder of exquisite technique, Bengoechea played for several clubs in Uruguay and Spain. He was the captain of the club C.A. Peñarol and the Uruguay national team. He also played at the 1990 World Cup. He is known by the nicknames of "the Professor" and "the Ten".

Honours Copa america :1987 and 1995

== Club career ==
Bengoechea, a native of Rivera, started his career at the Oriental Atlético Club of Rivera. He later played for Montevideo Wanderers, Sevilla FC of Spain, Gimnasia y Esgrima La Plata of Argentina and C.A. Peñarol.

=== Peñarol ===
Bengoechea's career at Peñarol was very successful in terms of titles won. He helped the team conquer the second “Quinquenio de Oro” (five consecutive league titles), winning the league title in the seasons of 1993, 1994, 1995, 1996, 1997. He also won titles in 1999 and 2003, the 1997 Liguilla, and two Parmalat championships in 1993 and 1994.

== National team ==
He represented the Uruguay national team from 1986 to 1997. He played in the Copa Americas of 1987 and 1995. He scored in the final of both the 1987 and 1995 Copas América, as Uruguay won the titles against Chile and Brazil, respectively. He played in Uruguay's loss at the 1990 World Cup against Belgium, coming in as a substitute and scoring the team's only goal of the match.

== Career statistics ==
=== International ===
Appearances and goals by national team and year
National team	Year	Apps	Goals
Uruguay	1986	3	0
Uruguay	1987	4	1
Uruguay	1988	1	0
Uruguay	1989	8	0
Uruguay	1990	2	1
Uruguay	1991	0	0
Uruguay	1992	0	0
Uruguay	1993	0	0
Uruguay	1994	1	0
Uruguay	1995	10	3
Uruguay	1996	6	1
Uruguay	1997	8	0
Total		43	6

Scores and results list Uruguay's goal tally first, score column indicates score after each Bengoechea goal.

List of international goals scored by Pablo Bengoechea
No.	Date	Venue	Opponent	Score	Result	Competition	Ref.
1	12 July 1987	Estadio Monumental, Buenos Aires, Argentina	Chile	1–0	1–0	1987 Copa América	
2	17 June 1990	Stadio Marcantonio Bentegodi, Verona, Italy	Belgium	1–3	1–3	1990 FIFA World Cup	
3	18 January 1995	Estadio Riazor, A Coruña, Spain	Spain	2–1	2–2	Friendly	
4	5 April 1995	Estadio Centenario, Montevideo, Uruguay	Peru	1–0	1–0	Friendly	
5	23 July 1995	Estadio Centenario, Montevideo, Uruguay	Brazil	1–1	1–1 (5-3 p)	1995 Copa América	
6	15 December 1996	Estadio Centenario, Montevideo, Uruguay	Peru	2–0	2–0	1998 FIFA World Cup qualification	
