= Cristobal Ceballos =

Spanish footballer (1916–1989)

Personal information
- Full name: Cristobal Ceballos García
- Date of birth: 5 August 1916
- Place of birth: Las Palmas, Spain
- Date of death: 14 December 1989 (aged 73)
- Place of death: Las Palmas, Spain
- Height: 1.74 m (5 ft 9 in)
- Position: Defender

Senior career*
Years	Team	Apps	(Gls)
- Santa Catalina FC
- CD Porteño
- Athletic de Palma
1940–1943	Barcelona	7	(0)
1943–1944	Barreda Balompié		
- * Club domestic league appearances and goals

Cristobal Ceballos García (5 August 1916 – 14 December 1989) was a Spanish footballer who played as a defender for Barcelona in the early 1940s.

== Playing career ==
Born on 5 August 1916 in Las Palmas, Ceballos began featuring as a defender since he was 16, playing for various clubs in his hometown, such as Santa Catalina FC, CD Porteño, and Athletic de Palma, where he quickly stood out from the rest, thus becoming a highly valued player sought after by the big clubs, including FC Barcelona, who failed to sign him due to his status as an "amateur"; his professional job was as a salesman in a chocolate factory. In the following season, however, Barça managed to sign him, together with fellow Canarian Quique, choosing Ceballos in hopes "to fill the gap that was missing in the Barça defense". After rejecting a last minute offer from Hilario's Deportivo de La Coruña, Ceballos went to the Catalan capital, accompanied by his father, where the local press described Ceballos as a "man of few words and modest in his treatment".

Ceballos made his debut in a friendly match against Levante on 22 September 1940, helping his side to keep a clean-sheet in a 4–0 win; however, he had to wait several months until making his official debut for Barça on 16 February 1941, in a La Liga fixture against Real Murcia, keeping another clean-sheet in a 3–0 victory. He remained loyal to the club for three years, from 1940 until 1943, scoring a total of 57 matches, with only 10 being official, seven in La Liga, two in the 1941 Copa del Generalísimo, and one in the Catalan championship. During his time at Barça, the club won the 1942 Copa del Generalísimo, beating Athletic Bilbao 4–3 in the final, but he failed to play a single cup match of that campaign, thus not being officially considered one of its winners.

After leaving Barça in 1943, Ceballos joined Barreda Balompié, which had just been promoted to the Tercera División, and in his first season at the club, he helped them win the 1944 Spanish Amateur Championship, beating the amateur team of his former club Barcelona 3–1 in the final.

== Death ==
Ceballos died in Las Palmas on 14 December 1989, at the age of 73.
