= Gonzalo Lorenzo =

Spanish footballer and manager

Personal information
- Full name: Gonzalo Lorenzo Codesido
- Place of birth: Pontevedra, Spain
- Place of death: Spain
- Position: Forward

Senior career*
Years	Team	Apps	(Gls)
1925	Eiriña		
1925–1930	Iberia de La Habana		
1930–1933	Eiriña		
1933–1936	Celta de Vigo		
- * Club domestic league appearances and goals

Gonzalo Lorenzo Codesido, also known as Gonzalito, was a Spanish footballer who played as a forward for Celta de Vigo in the 1930s.

== Playing career ==
Born in Pontevedra, Gonzalito began playing football with his older twin brothers Edelmiro and O'Donell on the banks of the Lérez River in Pontevedra and later in some local neighborhood teams. In the mid-1920s, the brothers joined local club Eiriña, which had been founded just a few years earlier, in 1922, and after being invited by some boys from Vilagarcía, they emigrated to Cuba to play for Iberia de La Habana, where they formed a powerful attacking trio, which played a crucial role in helping Iberia win three national championships in 1926, 1928, and 1929. He was noted for his efficiently in front of goal, being a quick, skillful, and opportunistic scorer.

When they returned to Spain in 1930, Gonzalito and O'Donell rejoined Eiriña, where they played together for three years, until 1933, when the latter went to Espanyol, thus teaming up with his twin Edelmiro, while Gonzalito was signed by Celta de Vigo, then in the Segunda División, who was seeking new reinforcements at the request of manager José María Peña. He scored his first goal for Celta on the opening day of the Galicia Championship, against his former club Eiriña. He quickly formed a strong attacking partnership with Nolete and Polo, which was the driving force behind Celta's victory at the 1933–34 Galician Championship, thus qualifying for the 1934 Copa del Rey, where, in the round of 16, he came face to face with his older brothers, then in Espanyol, who won the clash 5–4 on aggregate. Notably, on 28 January 1934, he scored a five-goal haul in a league match against Deportivo Alavés to help his side to a 8–0 victory.

Two seasons later, Gonzalito was one of the most used players by coach Ricardo Comesaña during Celta's triumphant campaign at the 1935–36 Segunda División, thus achieving promotion to La Liga. However, he never got the chance to make his top-flight debut with Celta because of the outbreak of the Spanish Civil War, during which he died. In total, he scored 50 goals in 86 matches for Celta, including not only his five-goal haul against Alavés, but also a further three hat-tricks.

== Honours ==
Iberia

- Cuba national championship
  - Champions (3): 1926, 1928, and 1929

Celta Vigo

- Segunda División:
  - Champions (1): 1935–36
