= Juanra (footballer, born 1995) =

Spanish footballer

Personal information
- Full name: Juan Ramón Gómez-Pimpollo López
- Date of birth: 18 January 1995 (age 31)
- Place of birth: La Solana, Spain
- Height: 1.78 m (5 ft 10 in)
- Position: Right back

Team information
- Current team: Pontevedra
- Number: 15

Youth career
- Albacete

Senior career*
Years	Team	Apps	(Gls)
2012–2016	Albacete B	43	(3)
2013–2016	Albacete	11	(0)
2015–2016	→ Atlético Astorga (loan)	26	(0)
2016–2017	Atlético Madrid B	5	(0)
2017–2018	Murcia	18	(2)
2018–2020	Talavera	42	(2)
2020–2023	San Sebastián	74	(4)
2023–2025	Atlético Baleares	54	(1)
2025–	Pontevedra	7	(0)
- * Club domestic league appearances and goals as of 30 November 2025

Juan Ramón Gómez-Pimpollo López (born 18 January 1995), commonly known as Juanra, is a Spanish footballer who plays for Primera Federación club Pontevedra as a right back.

== Club career ==
Born in La Solana, Ciudad Real, Castilla-La Mancha, Juanra finished his formation with local Albacete Balompié, making his senior debuts with the reserves in the lower leagues. On 11 September 2013 Juanra made his first team debut, starting in a 1–1 away draw against Gimnàstic de Tarragona in the season's Copa del Rey.

Juanra made his league debut on the 29th, playing the full 90 minutes in a 2–1 home success over CP Cacereño in the Segunda División B. He appeared in eight matches during the campaign, as Alba returned to the Segunda División after a three-year absence.

On 1 November 2014 Juanra played his match as a professional, starting in a 1–2 away loss against UD Las Palmas. The following 18 August, he was loaned to Atlético Astorga FC in the third division, for one year.

On 18 August 2016, Juanra left Alba, and signed for Atlético Madrid B two days later. The following 25 July, he joined Real Murcia of the third division.
