= Lorenzen (surname) =

Lorenzen is a surname. It is a patronymic from the name Lorenz. It is of North German, Dutch, Danish, and Norwegian origin.

== People with this surname include ==
- Asmus Lorenzen (1828–1912), German politician
- Bernhard Lorenzen (1907–1983), German soldier
- Carlos Frödden Lorenzen (1887–1976), Chilean Navy officer and politician
- David Lorenzen, (born 1940), American historian
- Donald D. Lorenzen (1920–1980), member of the Los Angeles City Council
- Fred Lorenzen (1934–2024), American NASCAR driver
- Hansigne Lorenzen (1870–1952), Danish writer and lace expert
- Henry Lorenzen (1899–1961), Danish actor
- Jannik Lorenzen (born 1994), Danish actor
- Jared Lorenzen (1981–2019), American football player
- Lefty Lorenzen (1893–1963), American baseball player
- Mark Lorenzen (born 1966), American video game designer
- Melvyn Lorenzen (born 1994), Ugandan professional footballer
- Michael Lorenzen (born 1992), American baseball player
- Paul Lorenzen (1915–1994), German philosopher and mathematician
- Peer Lorenzen (born 1944), Danish judge
- Peter Hiort-Lorenzen (born 1943), Danish furniture designer
- Rudolf Lorenzen (1922–2013), German author
- Tyler Lorenzen (born 1985), American football player
- Ursel Lorenzen, former West German NATO Secretary
- Wolfram Lorenzen (?–2020), German pianist

== See also ==
- Lorenzo (name), surname and given name
