= De Lorenzo =

De Lorenzo is an Italian surname. Notable people with the surname include:

- Francesco De Lorenzo (born 1938), Italian physician and politician
- Giovanni De Lorenzo (1907–1973), Italian Army general, intelligence officer, and politician
- Italo De Lorenzo (1939–2025), Italian bobsledder
- Leonardo De Lorenzo (1875–1962), Italian flautist

== See also ==
- Lorenzo (disambiguation)
- di Lorenzo
