= AP Almansa =

Association football club in Spain

Almansa
- Full name: Asociación Polideportiva Almansa
- Founded: 1948
- Dissolved: 1991
- Ground: Paco Simón, Almansa, Castile-La Mancha, Spain
- Capacity: 5,000
- 1990–91: 1ª Regional Preferente – Group 2, 18th of 18 (retired)
Home colours

Asociación Polideportiva Almansa was a Spanish football team located in Almansa, Albacete, in the autonomous community of Castilla–La Mancha. Founded in 1948, the club played in 18 Tercera División seasons before being dissolved in 1991.

== History ==
=== Club names ===
- Sociedad Deportiva Almansa (1948–49)
- Grupo de Empresa Girón (1949–50)
- Sociedad Deportiva Almansa (1950–66)
- Asociación Polideportiva Almansa (1966–1991)

==== Other clubs from Almansa ====
- Club Deportivo Almansa — (1940–47)
- Asociación Polideportiva Almansa — (1948–91)
- Unión Deportiva Almansa — (1992–)

== Season to season ==
Season	Tier	Division	Place	Copa del Rey
1948–49	4	1ª Reg.	9th	
1949–50	4	1ª Reg.	7th	
1950–51	4	1ª Reg.	7th	
1951–52	4	1ª Reg.	12th	
1952–53	4	1ª Reg.	6th	
1953–54	4	1ª Reg.	13th	
1954–55	4	1ª Reg.	1st	
1955–56	3	3ª	10th	
1956–57	3	3ª	8th	
1957–58	3	3ª	17th	
1958–59	4	1ª Reg.	6th	
1959–60	4	1ª Reg.	6th	
1960–61	4	1ª Reg.	2nd	
1961–62	3	3ª	8th	
1962–63	3	3ª	5th	
1963–64	3	3ª	10th	
1964–65	3	3ª	14th	
1965–66	4	1ª Reg.	13th	
1966–67	4	1ª Reg.	2nd	
1967–68	3	3ª	14th	

Season	Tier	Division	Place	Copa del Rey
1968–69	4	1ª Reg.	10th	
1969–70	4	1ª Reg.	6th	
1970–71	4	1ª Reg.	12th	
1971–72	4	Reg. Pref.	14th	
1972–73	4	Reg. Pref.	15th	
1973–74	4	Reg. Pref.	10th	
1974–75	4	Reg. Pref.	9th	
1975–76	4	Reg. Pref.	10th	
1976–77	4	Reg. Pref.	3rd	
1977–78	4	3ª	3rd	
1978–79	4	3ª	9th	
1979–80	4	3ª	12th	First round
1980–81	4	3ª	20th	
1981–82	5	Reg. Pref.	2nd	
1982–83	4	3ª	6th	
1983–84	4	3ª	7th	
1984–85	4	3ª	18th	
1985–86	5	Reg. Pref.	1st	
1986–87	4	3ª	9th	
1987–88	4	3ª	4th	

Season	Tier	Division	Place	Copa del Rey
1988–89	4	3ª	19th	
1989–90	5	Reg. Pref.	3rd	
1990–91	5	Reg. Pref.	(R)	

- 18 seasons in Tercera División
