= Manuel Garriga (Spanish footballer) =

Spanish footballer

Personal information
- Full name: Manuel Garriga Bertolín
- Date of birth: 19 June 1928
- Place of birth: Barcelona, Catalonia, Spain
- Date of death: 5 August 2019 (aged 91)
- Place of death: Barcelona, Catalonia, Spain
- Position: Goalkeeper

Youth career
- 1942–1944: Barcelona U16
- 1944–1946: Barcelona U19

Senior career*
Years	Team	Apps	(Gls)
1946–1950	Barcelona Amateur		
1950–1952	España Industrial	26	
1952–1953	Granollers		
1953	Mataró		
1953–1954	Atlètic Gracienc		
- * Club domestic league appearances and goals

Manuel Garriga Bertolín (19 June 1928 – 5 August 2019) was a Spanish footballer who played as a goalkeeper for Barcelona in the late 1940s.

== Playing career ==
=== Club career ===
Born on 19 June 1928 in Barcelona, Garriga began his football career in the youth ranks of FC Barcelona, remaining there until he finally broke through to the Barça Amateur team in 1946, with whom he played for four years, until 1950. During this period, he was sometimes called-up for the first team, making his debut on 4 April 1948, in a friendly match against his future club España Industrial, helping his side to a 4–2 win. In total, he played 17 friendly matches for Barça's first team, mainly in the Copa Catalunya, a friendly cup. With the Barça Amateur team, Garriga played a crucial role in helping his side win the 1948 Spanish Amateur Championship, beating Indautxu 3–2 in the final. He was also crowned Catalan amateur champion in 1951 following a 2–1 victory over Espanyol at the Sarrià Stadium.

After leaving Barça in 1950, Garriga went on to play two seasons at España Industrial (1950–52), which was followed by short stints at Granollers (1952–53), Mataró (1953), and Atlètic Gracienc (1953–54).

== Later life ==
A close friend of Spanish international Gustau Biosca, Garriga was a member of the Agrupació Barça Jugadors (ABJ), a non-profit organization to help former Barça players, where he participated in social activities for many years, such as the Annual Dinner.

Garriga died in Barcelona on 5 August 2019, at the age of 91, and was buried two days later.

== Honours ==
Barcelona Amateur

- Spanish Amateur Championship:
  - Champions (1): 1948
