= Daniel Díaz Maynard =

Uruguayan lawyer and politician

Daniel Díaz Maynard (1933 – 22 March 2007) was an Uruguayan lawyer and politician.

== Political role ==
Maynard was a deputy representing the department of Montevideo, from 1990 until 2005).

He was also an activist for human rights and worked to defend political prisoners and dissidents, many from neighbouring Argentina.

== Political alignment ==
He was a member of the Broad Front political grouping supporting President Tabaré Vázquez, and had belonged to the Social Cristianos party, a branch of the Christian Democrats.

== Death ==
He died in 2007. His remains are buried at the Central Cemetery of Montevideo.

== See also ==
- Politics of Uruguay
