= José Garreta (footballer, born 1941) =

Spanish footballer (1941–2015

Personal information
- Full name: José Garreta Viles
- Birth name: Josep Garreta i Viles
- Date of birth: 22 November 1941
- Place of birth: Barcelona, Spain
- Date of death: 1 January 2015 (aged 73)
- Place of death: L'Hospitalet de Llobregat, Spain
- Position: Defender

Youth career
- 1956–1957: Peña Alirón
- 1957–1959: Barcelona U19

Senior career*
Years	Team	Apps	(Gls)
1959–1960	Barcelona Amateur		
1960–1961	Sant Andreu	26	
1961–1962	L'Hospitalet		
1962–1963	UD Arbúcies		
1963–1968	Unió Esportiva Tossa		
1968–1969	UD Bellvitge		
- * Club domestic league appearances and goals

José Garreta Viles (22 November 1941 – 1 January 2015) was a Spanish footballer who played as a defender for several modest Catalan clubs, being named the best defender of the Catalonia Regional League in the 1963–64 season.

== Early life ==
José Garreta was born in the Catalonian town of Barcelona on 22 November 1941, as the second son of José Garreta Sabadell, a former footballer who had played for Espanyol in the 1932–33 season.

== Career ==
In 1956, the 15-year-old Garreta began playing football at Peña Alirón, a team affiliated with FC Barcelona, whose coaches requested his transfer to the Barcelona youth team in 1957, with whom he played for three years. In his last season at Barça (1959–60), he played for the club's amateur team, and even made one appearance for the club's first team, in a friendly match against Olesa on 26 June 1960, helping his side to a 3–2 victory.

In 1960, Garreta joined Sant Andreu, then in the Tercera División, where he immediately earned a starting position in the defensive line. At the end of the season, he signed for L'Hospitalet at the request of its coach, Mario Anchisi. In 1962, however, he was called up to carry out his mandatory military service in Arbúcies, so he signed for the club's local team. Once his duties were complete, he joined Unió Esportiva Tossa, where he quickly established himself as one of its most important players and was named the most outstanding defender in the Catalan regional category in the 1963–64 season. In an interview with Mundo Deportivo in November 1964, Garreta stated that he considered Alfredo Di Stefano to be "the best player currently".

Garreta stayed at Tossa for five years, from 1963 until 1968, when he joined UD Bellvitge, where he retired in 1969, aged 28.

== Later life ==
Garriga died in L'Hospitalet de Llobregat on 1 January 2015, at the age of 91.
