= Salustiano Santos =

Spanish footballer (1918–1995)

Personal information
- Full name: Salustiano Santos Pérez
- Date of birth: 20 April 1918
- Place of birth: Seville, Spain
- Date of death: 11 December 1995 (aged 77)
- Place of death: Seville, Spain
- Position: Forward

Senior career*
Years	Team	Apps	(Gls)
1935–1936	Sevilla Amateur		
1938–1942	Sevilla	31	(11)
1942–1943	Valencia	4	(0)
1943–1945	Espanyol	1	(0)
1946–1947	Real Betis		
Total		36	(11)
- * Club domestic league appearances and goals

Salustiano Santos Pérez (20 April 1918 – 11 December 1995) was a Spanish footballer who played as a Forward for Sevilla, Valencia, Espanyol, and Real Betis between 1938 and 1946.

== Playing career ==
Born on 20 April 1918 in Seville, (Note: Some sources wrongly claim that he was born on 22 April 1916 in Nerva, Spain.) Santos began his football career at his hometown club Sevilla in 1935, helping the Sevilla amateur team that won the Spanish Amateur Championship in 1936, scoring the opening goal of the final to help his side to a 3–1 win over Real Zaragoza at the Mestalla. He had to wait for the end of the Spanish Civil War to finally make his competitive debut for Sevilla's first team, a La Liga fixture against Racing de Santander on 3 March 1940. During his time in Sevilla, Santos, a technically gifted player, gradually shifted to the left wing, where he was capable of finishing, scoring 11 goals in 31 La Liga matches, including a brace against city rivals Real Betis to help his side to a 4–3 victory.

Santos remained loyal to Sevilla for three years, until 1942, when he was signed by Valencia to replace the 32-year-old Guillermo Gorostiza, whose retirement was being expected to happen in a near future, but Gorostiza ended up lasting three more seasons, which severely limited Santos' opportunities, making his competitive debut only on 14 March 1943, in which he missed several clear goals in an eventual 1–2 loss to Castellón. In total, he only played five competitive matches that season, four in La Liga, in which he failed to score, and one in the Copa del Rey, where he scored once against Deportivo de La Coruña at the Riazor.

Unsatisfied with his lack of playing time, Santos left Valencia at the end of the season and signed for Espanyol, where he stayed for two seasons, from 1943 until 1945, but only managed to play a single league game, against Real Sociedad at the Sarriá, with the rest being friendlies. In 1946, he signed for Betis, then in the Segunda División, where he played just three league matches, but he then retired at the end of the season, at the age of 28.

== Death ==
Santos died on 11 December 1995, at the age of 77.
