= Adrián Gómez =

Argentine footballer

Personal information
- Full name: Adrián Horacio Gómez
- Date of birth: 12 June 1984 (age 42)
- Place of birth: Ciudadela, Argentina
- Height: 1.70 m (5 ft 7 in)
- Position: Right back

Team information
- Current team: Arosa

Youth career
- Nueva Chicago

Senior career*
| Years | Team | Apps | (Gls) |
| 2004–2007 | Nueva Chicago | 36 | (0) |
| 2007–2008 | Pontevedra B | 12 | (0) |
| 2008–2009 | Villalonga | 35 | (1) |
| 2009–2010 | Pontevedra B | 34 | (0) |
| 2010–2011 | Temperley | 38 | (4) |
| 2011–2012 | Villalonga | 36 | (0) |
| 2012–2017 | Pontevedra | 135 | (1) |
| 2017–2019 | Rápido Bouzas | 69 | (1) |
| 2019– | Arosa | 6 | (0) |
- * Club domestic league appearances and goals as of 18:10, 6 October 2019 (UTC)

Adrián Horacio Gómez (born 12 June 1984) is an Argentine footballer who plays for Spanish club Arosa SC as a right back.

== Club career ==
Born in Ciudadela, Buenos Aires, Gómez represented Club Atlético Nueva Chicago as a youth. Following the club's relegation to Primera B Nacional in 2004, he was promoted to the first team and started to feature regularly until their promotion in 2006.

In 2007 Gómez moved to Spain, and joined Pontevedra CF's reserves in Tercera División. After appearing sparingly, he moved to fellow league team Villalonga FC.

After being an undisputed starter, Gómez returned to Pontevedra and its B-team in 2009. The following year he returned to his home country, after agreeing to a contract with Primera B Metropolitana side Club Atlético Temperley; in July 2011, however, he returned to his previous club Villalonga.

In 2012 Gómez again joined Pontevedra, now assigned to the main squad also in the fourth division. He was a first-choice during the club's promotion to Segunda División B in 2015, as team captain.

On 19 July 2017, after being rarely used during the 2016–17 campaign, Gómez signed for Rápido de Bouzas also in the third level.

== Personal life ==
Gómez is the cousin of Leo Garaycoechea, also a footballer and a right back who also played in Spain for the majority of his career.
