= Patrizio Di Renzo =

Swiss photographer and director

Patrizio Di Renzo (born May 6, 1971 in Zug, Switzerland) is a Swiss photographer and director.

== Bio ==
At 16, Di Renzo begins training as an industrial photographer, which he concludes successfully after three years. At that time, his work did not involve fashion photography. Di Renzo then travels to Paris where he works as an assistant to Bruno Bisang for two years, which is followed by a period of a few years working as a freelance photographer in Milan.

At the beginning of the nineties, Di Renzo leaves Italy to make first experiences in the field of fashion photography. Amongst others, he works in Istanbul for fashion magazines such as Harper’s Bazaar and Elle. In 2001, Di Renzo returns to Switzerland for a short time to work as an advertising and fashion photographer. A few years later, his work draws the attention of fashion designer Tsumori Chisato who commissions him for an international campaign as well as a store concept. During this period, Di Renzo – who in the meantime, has moved to New York/Los Angeles – takes up work on his first book of photographs, „Portraits of Illusions“. The photo book tells short stories with pictures taken, amongst others, in Ireland, New York, and the Seychelles. The photos intentionally drift away from reality - Di Renzo’s motto being: Move away from Realism. The book was published in 2006, with a preface by critic Gabriel Bauret. During this time, Di Renzo works with, amongst others, Devon Aoki, Chloë Sevigny, Natalia Vodianova, Dean&Dan (DSQUARED).

In 2005, Di Renzo returns to Switzerland and opens a photo studio in Baar.

2010 marks Di Renzo’s debut as a music clip producer for Italian singer Enzo Fertitta and as the director of his first video installation, for Issey Miyake. In recent projects Di Renzo worked with Rie Rasmussen, Iekeliene Stange and Mads Mikkelsen.

Di Renzo’s second book, “Merlin’s Dream”, in which he stages Merlin’s dreams with flowers, was published in October 2010. “Merlin’s Dream” was published by Swiss publishing house Zauberkind, with a foreword by Tsumori Chisato.

== Artwork ==
Di Renzo’s work is characterized by its distance to the real world. You could describe him as a director who combines the magic with the sensual; the romantic with the lascivious; the naive with the erotic - and thus creates a unique dream world.

== Literature ==
=== Art Books ===
- Portraits of Illusions, ISBN 2-84323-694-0
- Merlin's Dream, ISBN 978-3-905904-44-4
