= Alfonso XIII CF =

Football club in Spain active between 1915 and 1941

Alfonso XIII
- Full name: Alfonso XIII Club de Fútbol
- Short name: Alfonso XIII CF
- Founded: 1915
- Dissolved: 16 October 1941
- Ground: Campo do Burgo
- 1940–41: Serie A, 2nd of 5

Alfonso XIII Club de Fútbol was a Spanish football club located in Pontevedra, Galicia, that existed from 1915 until 16 October 1941, when it merged with Eiriña CF to form the Pontevedra CF.

== History ==
=== Origins ===
Founded in 1915, Alfonso XIII CF was officially established on 12 February 1921 after the relevant presentation of its regulations. Its uniform was a white and red striped shirt and black shorts, and it played its home games at Campo do Burgo. In 1918, Alfonso won the Galician B championship, thus achieving promotion to the top tier, where it reached the final at the first time of asking. Also in 1919, the team played some important friendly matches, losing to Sabadell 1–0 and drawing with Stadium Ovetense 1–1.

=== Golden age ===
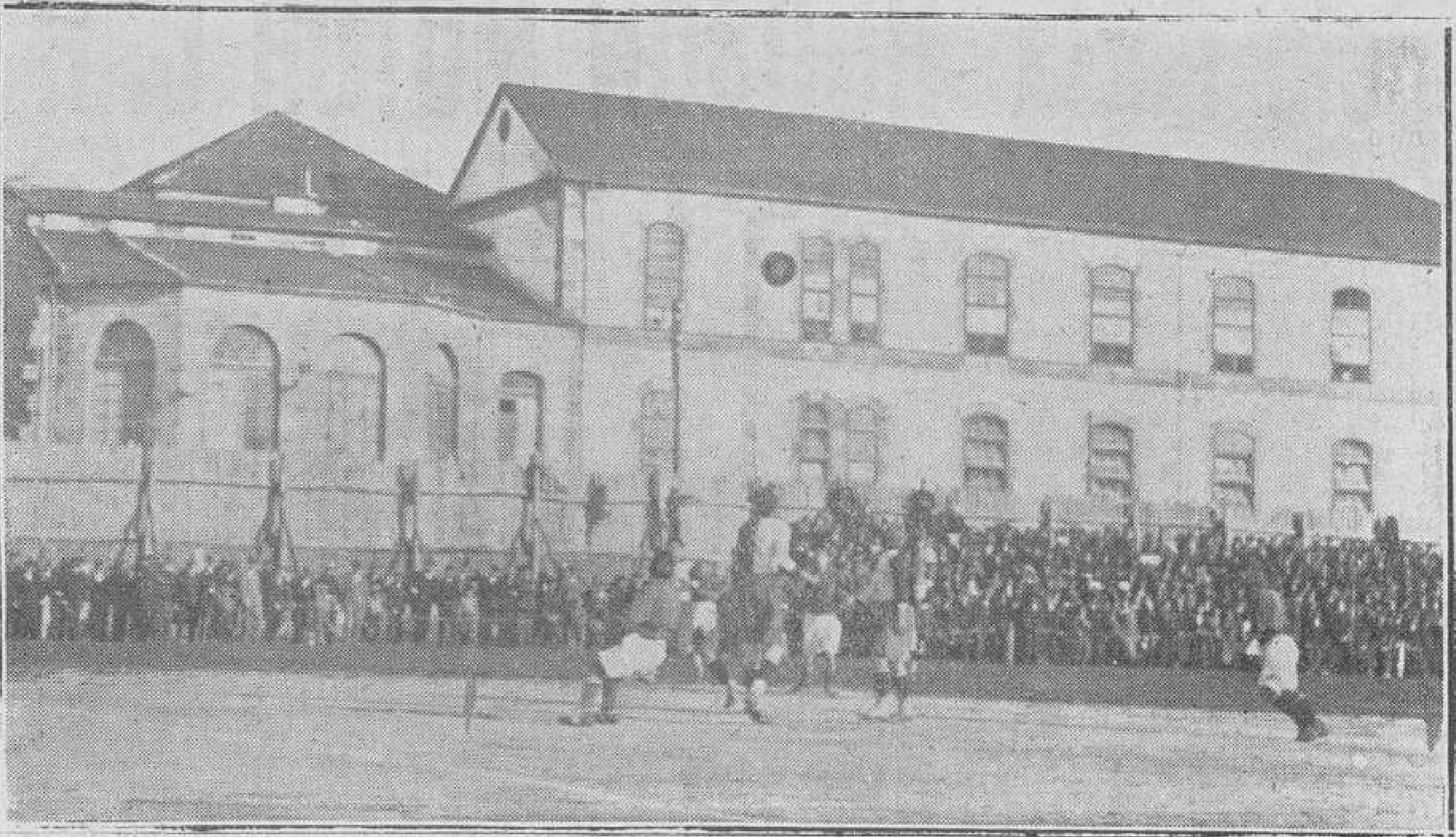
Match between Alfonso XIII and Acero Club de Olabeaga played on 31 March 1924 at Campo do Progreso

On 1 November 1922, Alfonso was the first-ever opponent of the newly established Eiriña CF. Together with Eiriña and the Pontevedra Athletic Club, Alfonso became one of the three most important clubs in the city in the early 1920s, competing in the Galicia Championship until 1926, when Pontevedra AC went into a crisis largely thanks to the arrival of professionalism, losing many of its main players and disappearing in 1926. The other two, Alfonso and Eiriña, managed to survive due to their youth and organization.

In April 1931, the Spanish Second Republic was established and the Alfonsista club was forced to change its name, becoming known as Pontevedra Sport Club; while Eiriña FC became the main club in the city, proclaiming itself Champion of Serie B in 1923 and playing in the first Category since then. The outbreak of the Spanish Civil War stopped all regional competitions, although the Galician Championship continued to be held normally in Galicia.

=== Decline and collapse ===
When the War ended, both Pontevedra and Eiriña remained active, but the great sporting and human burden caused by the conflict made their development almost unfeasible, so the directors of both clubs decided to meet and discuss a way out of this situation, which ended up being their merger into a single entity that was capable of representing the city. Thus, on 16 October 1941, the Pontevedra Club de Fútbol was established and its first president was Fernando Ponte Conde.

== Honours ==
- Galician Championship of Serie B:
  - Champions (3): 1923–24, 1924–25, and 1927–28
