= Di Lorenzo =

Surname list

Di Lorenzo or DiLorenzo is an Italian surname. It derives from the name Lorenzo, the surname indicates those of the family of a Lorenzo. Notable people with the surname include:

- Francesca Di Lorenzo (born 1997), Italian-American tennis player
- Giovanni Di Lorenzo (born 1993), Italian footballer
- Giovanni di Lorenzo (journalist) (born 1959), Italian-German journalist
- Rossana Di Lorenzo (1938–2022), Italian actress
- Tina Di Lorenzo (1872–1930), Italian actress
- Thomas DiLorenzo (born 1954), Italian-American Professor
- Rosario DiLorenzo (born 1994), Italian-American Emmy Award Winner
- Melanie DiLorenzo (born 2002), Italian-American professional drummer
