= José Garreta (footballer, born 1912) =

Spanish footballer and manager (1912–2005)

Personal information
- Full name: José Garreta Sabadell
- Birth name: Josep Garreta i Sabadell
- Date of birth: 31 January 1912
- Place of birth: Vic, Spain
- Date of death: 14 January 2005 (aged 92)
- Place of death: L'Hospitalet de Llobregat, Spain
- Position: Forward

Youth career
- Sabadell

Senior career*
Years	Team	Apps	(Gls)
1930–1932	Sabadell		
1932–1933	Espanyol	13	(7)
1933	Racing de Ferrol		
1933–1934	Real Murcia		
1934–1935	Granollers		
1936–1937	Vic		

International career
1934	Catalonia	1	(0)

Managerial career
- 1942–1946: UE Sants
- 1950–1952: UE Sants
- 1952–1953: Horta
- 1962–1963: Sitges
- 1963–1964: Viladecans
- * Club domestic league appearances and goals

José Garreta Sabadell (31 January 1912 – 14 January 2005) was a Spanish footballer who played as a forward for Espanyol in the 1930s.

== Career ==
Born in the Catalonian town of Vic on 31 January 1912, (Note: Some sources wrongly claim that he was born on 30 January 1911.) Garreta began his football career at Sabadell in 1930, aged 18, where he quickly stood out for his aggressiveness and goal-scoring ability, excelling as a center forward. He stayed there for two years, until 1932, when he decided to leave the club for financial reasons, being then signed for 1,500 pesetas by Espanyol, where he earned a monthly salary of 300 pesetas. In his first (and only) season there, he scored 30 goals in 30 official matches, including 7 goals in 13 La Liga matches, thus finishing that season as Espanyol's top scorer in the league, tied with Ubaldo Redó.

The following season, Garreta played for both Racing de Ferrol and Real Murcia, playing nine Segunda División matches with the latter; however, he left the club due to financial disagreements. He then returned to Catalonia, where he played for Granollers and Vic, where he retired in 1937, aged 25.

On 29 July 1934, he earned his first (and only) international cap for the Catalan national team against his former club Sabadell at Creu Alta, in a tribute match to benefit Sabadell player Santiago Sitges, who had been hospitalized after a motorcycle accident a few days earlier; it ended in a 1–1 draw.

== Managerial career ==
During the 1940s, 1950s, and 1960s, Garreta coached several modest Catalan teams, such as Sants (1942–46 and 1950–52), Horta (1952–53), Sitges (1962–63), and Viladecans (1963–64).

== Death ==
Garreta died in L'Hospitalet de Llobregat on 14 January 2005, at the age of 92. His son, José Garreta Viles, also played for Sant Andreu teams.
