= Joe DeRenzo =

American drummer

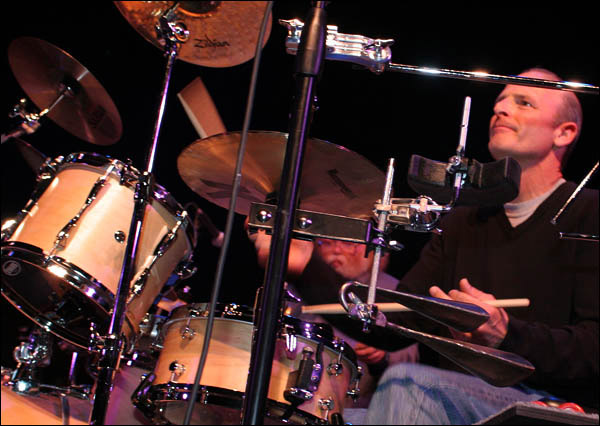
- Joe DeRenzo at Saddleback College in 2008

Background information
- Born: Joseph Peter DeRenzo; November 1, 1958 (age 67); Orange County, California
- Genres: Jazz fusion, world music
- Occupation: Musician
- Instrument: Drums
- Years active: 1970–present
- Website: joederenzo.com

Joseph Peter DeRenzo (born November 1, 1958) is an American jazz drummer, composer and producer. He is also a member of the Screen Actors Guild.

DeRenzo has worked with Nile's Project to help stop MRSA through public awareness concerts featuring his Beatles tribute band Joe DeRenzo & Friends, a jazzy tribute to The Beatles.

== Biography ==
=== 1958-70 ===
DeRenzo was born and raised in Orange County, California, and resided in the city of Anaheim and in what is now known as Anaheim Hills for the early part of his life through 1970. It was during these years that his interest in music began by way of his dad's record collection which included the LPs of Frank Sinatra, Ray Charles, Louie Bellson and Boots Randolph. While attending St. Catherine's Military Academy from 1964 through 1966, the sound of the drums from the cadet marching band served as the inspiration for DeRenzo to fashion his first pair of drumsticks in his uncle's garage. "Thanks to the Beatles' appearance on The Ed Sullivan Show, Ringo Starr was probably the first drummer that made an impression on me."

By the mid- to late 1960s, AM and FM radio begin to provide the alternative soundtrack to his expanding musical awareness with pop bands such as the Beatles, Rolling Stones and Lovin Spoonful. Intrigued by the cover art of, most notably Jimi Hendrix's Are You Experienced? and Cream's Disraeli Gears, DeRenzo begins his fascination with late 1960s Pop-Art including Peter Max posters, scarves and school notebooks. Using his friend's copy of the In-A-Gadda-Da-Vida LP as a practice pad, he woodsheds to the Ron Bushy psychedelic opus and drum solo virtually destroying the cover in the process.

=== 1971-89 ===
Fall of 1971 in Laguna Hills, California, DeRenzo meets future Tasca bandmates Bob Greco and Glenn Papandrea. Original lineup for Tasca is Bob Greco, Glenn Papandrea, Mike Tortorette, Jeff Petrie (now Sargeant), Joe DeRenzo. The band plays its first gig at a girl's birthday party. The girl is disappointed when the band is unable to play her request of Puppy Love. The band is paid $10.00 which nets DeRenzo his first professional scratch of $2.00. After an altercation at rehearsal, Tortorette is forced out of the band. The quartet continues playing junior high school dances and parties then disbands over creative differences within two years.

April 6, 1974, DeRenzo is one of 250,000 music fans attending The California Jam at the Ontario Motor Speedway. August 1974, begins working at The Music House, a small sole proprietorship and retail music store near his home owned by Dan Molinari. There he meets jazz guitarist and luthier Alan Simcoe. DeRenzo is influenced by both Molinari and Simcoe to study jazz. At the store he reads his first copy of Downbeat Magazine. Following his graduation from Mission Viejo High School and Silverado continuation school on February 9, 1976, DeRenzo attends Saddleback College to study jazz music in the Thursday night Big Band under the direction of Bill Kirk.

Fall of 1978, DeRenzo goes with Dan Molinari to hear Robben Ford at Dante's, a jazz club on Lankershim Blvd in North Hollywood and meets Dan's hometown friend Russell Ferrante. January 1979, DeRenzo attends the NAMM Show and catches Jaco Pastorius and Peter Erskine Bass & Drum concert at the Acoustic Amplifier booth. After a meeting at the trade-show, DeRenzo begins studying drums with Erskine at his home in Encino, California.

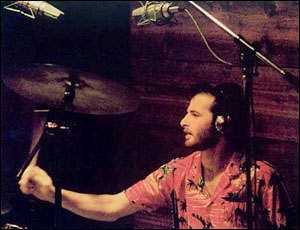
Joe DeRenzo, 1983

1981, DeRenzo meets jazz pianist Tom Zink on a Saddleback Big Band gig at Mission Viejo Mall. This leads to forming a band with bass player Bill Bieschke and Canadian jazz guitarist Brian Hughes who Bill meets at GIT in Hollywood. The band known as The Brian Hughes Group performs at LA jazz clubs including Two Dollar Bills and others in the Southern California area including The Wind and Sea in Dana Point. Summer of 1982, DeRenzo, Tom Zink and Bill Bieschke travel to Edmonton, Alberta, to perform at Walden's and other clubs in Edmonton and in Banff, Alberta.

Thanksgiving weekend, 1984, DeRenzo travels to Las Vegas to audition for Las Vegas lounge act, the Dae Han Sisters and is offered the job. DeRenzo stays with the band for 10 months performing in the lounges of The Flamingo and International Hilton in Las Vegas, Reno Hilton and other venues. During this time at an outside gig for a Los Angeles hotel, jazz guitarist Grant Geissman sits in with the band for the evening. Upon leaving The Dae Han Sisters, DeRenzo turns his interests to film, theatre and acting. Fall of 1985, begins attending Jack Manning's scene study workshop in Los Angeles. Over the next two years performs scenes primarily of playwrights David Mamet and Sam Shepard.

October 1987, DeRenzo joins the Screen Actors Guild. For the next two years works on several movies, commercials and TV shows as an extra and uncredited bit parts including a party goer with Charlie Sheen for Japanese TV commercial, Tokyo Gas. The costumed "Mr Sparks" on It's Garry Shandling's Show (season 2, episode 10). 1940's cop with Perry King for the TV movie, "Shakedown on the Sunset Strip" CBS 1988. After a preproduction photo session for the film Bird, DeRenzo is offered a ride by a then future Academy Award-winning actor Forest Whitaker.

=== 1990-2009 ===
October 1992, DeRenzo moves to Seattle, Washington. For the next 8 years, DeRenzo focuses on his photography with the German-made panoramic camera known as the Noblex.

September 1998, meets artist Peter Max on Lexington Avenue and 31st Street in New York City. Over the next two years DeRenzo works on several photographic projects with Max which include 3-D and panoramic formats. 2002 Abrams Books publishes The Art of Peter Max containing several of DeRenzo's photographs including a 360 degree panorama of Max's studio and the hangar photo of the Boeing 777 painted for the millennium celebration as a roving ambassador for the city of New York. Photo credits in the book appear as Joseph DeRenzo.

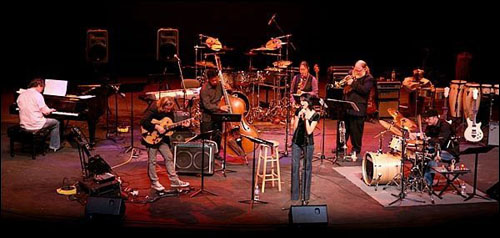
MRSA public awareness concert, Saddleback Collage, 9-20-2008

January 2005, DeRenzo records his first CD entitled "Of Night and Day" with longtime friend and jazz pianist Tom Zink. On the project is founding Yellowjackets members Russell Ferrante and Jimmy Haslip. This release is followed up in January 2006 with the recording of "Core Beliefs" which included Bob Mintzer and Brian Hughes. March 16, 2007, ESC Records releases "Dante's View" which is a compilation of "Of Night and Day" and "Core Beliefs". November 2007, ESC Records releases "Step Inside LOVE, a jazzy tribute to The Beatles which features DeRenzo's recording of She's A Woman from "Core Beliefs".

March 2008, DeRenzo stages the first of two public awareness concerts with Nile's Project at Saddleback College presented as "A Night For Nile".

June 2009, Anne Walsh and Tom Zink release the "Pretty World" CD which includes lyrics penned by DeRenzo for the compositions of Pat Metheny "So May It Secretly Begin", Keith Jarrett "My Song" and Don Grolnick "Pools".

December 3, 2009, DeRenzo is informed that Tom Zink is nominated for a Grammy in the Arranging Category for his arrangement of "In The Still Of The Night" from the "Pretty World" CD.

=== 2010-2015 ===
Author Walter Kolosky commissions DeRenzo to design the book cover for Follow Your Heart: John McLaughlin - song by song. The listener's guide is published by Abstract Logix Books on November 1, 2010.

September 2011, Anne Walsh and Tom Zink release the "Go" CD which includes lyrics penned by DeRenzo for the composition of Wayne Shorter "Go".

== Influences ==
Music and Drums: Beatles, Chick Corea, Joe Zawinul, Keith Jarrett, John McLaughlin, Pat Metheny, Jack DeJohnette, Peter Erskine, Billy Cobham, Lenny White, John Guerin, Steve Gadd, Airto.

Authors: Leonard Peikoff, Ayn Rand, Christopher Hitchens, Camille Paglia.

== Discography ==
- Dante's View (ESC, 2007)
