= Pontevedra CF =

Pontevedra
- Full name: Pontevedra Club de Fútbol, S.A.D.
- Nicknames: Pontevedriña; Ponte; Os Granates; O Hai que Roelo; Atila rey de los hunos
- Founded: 16 October 1941; 85 years ago
- Ground: Pasarón, Pontevedra, Galicia, Spain
- Capacity: 10,500
- President: Lupe Murillo
- Head coach: Rubén Domínguez
- League: Primera Federación – Group 1
- 2025–26: Primera Federación – Group 1, 6th of 20
- Website: pontevedracf.com
Home colours	Away colours

Pontevedra Club de Fútbol, S.A.D. is a Spanish football team in Pontevedra, in the autonomous community of Galicia. Founded on 16 October 1941 it currently plays in Primera Federación – Group 1, holding home matches at Estadio Municipal de Pasarón, with a capacity of 10,500 seats.

Having enjoyed its heyday in the 1960s, it even reached the First Division, leading it during November and December 1965.

== History ==
Pontevedra Club de Fútbol was founded in 1941, following the merge of the two top teams in the city at the time: Eiriña CF and Alfonso XIII CF. The first president of the new club was Fernando Ponte Conde.

In the 1959–60 season, in the last few games of the season, Pontevedra defeated Burgos 3–1 in the Estadio Municipal de Pasarón. Pontevedra then beat an unknown team 2-0 and in the final game, and beat León 1–0 in extra time leading them to promotion to the Segunda Division.

Pontevedra was promoted to La Liga in 1963 but relegated a year after, managing to play again in the top flight between 1965 and 1970. During this time the fans coined the motto Hai que roelo, in reference to the difficulties rival teams had when playing a strong side, who achieved a seventh place in 1966, adding an eighth two seasons later; midfielder Ignacio Martín-Esperanza and forwards Neme and Roldán were among the stars of this era, and years following the 1972–73 season saw the team more often than not struggling in lower categories, well into the 2000s.

Pontevedra returned to the Segunda División after 20 years on 27 June 2004, after winning their Segunda División B group and defeating Lorca Deportiva CF on the final day of the playoffs. The team struggled in their one year back in national professional football, finishing dead last but winning 4–1 at home in their final fixture against fellow relegated team UD Salamanca.

On 23 January 2007 Pontevedra was transformed into a Sociedad Anónima Deportiva (sporting Joint stock company), as required by Spanish law – this was a general measure introduced in order to revitalise the financial situation of professional football clubs. Yet, some risked disappearance as they could not face the cost involved in this transformation from "private" to "stock company". In the club's case this was made possible after then president, Nino Mirón, had purchased 52 per cent of the stock options; the club then added the letters "S.A.D." to its official name.

In 2010–11, Pontevedra had the stated aim of returning to the second tier, but following an economic crisis that saw them sell Brazilian star Igor de Souza, the team were relegated to the Tercera División for the first time in 27 years; relegation was sealed with a 5–1 home defeat to CD Guadalajara. Four years later, the team bounced back, winning their group before defeating Haro Deportivo 3–1 on aggregate in the play-off final.

== Season to season ==
Season	Tier	Division	Place	Copa del Rey
1942–43	3	Serie A	3rd	
1943–44	3	3ª	4th	Second round
1944–45	3	3ª	6th	
1945–46	3	3ª	3rd	
1946–47	3	3ª	1st	
1947–48	3	3ª	1st	Fourth round
1948–49	3	3ª	8th	
1949–50	3	3ª	9th	
1950–51	3	3ª	9th	
1951–52	3	3ª	5th	
1952–53	3	3ª	12th	
1953–54	3	3ª	12th	
1954–55	3	3ª	2nd	
1955–56	3	3ª	6th	
1956–57	3	3ª	15th	
1957–58	4	Serie A	2nd	
1958–59	3	3ª	9th	
1959–60	3	3ª	1st	
1960–61	2	2ª	5th	First round
1961–62	2	2ª	9th	Round of 32

Season	Tier	Division	Place	Copa del Rey
1962–63	2	2ª	1st	First round
1963–64	1	1ª	15th	Round of 16
1964–65	2	2ª	1st	Quarter-finals
1965–66	1	1ª	7th	Round of 32
1966–67	1	1ª	10th	Quarter-finals
1967–68	1	1ª	8th	Round of 16
1968–69	1	1ª	12th	Round of 16
1969–70	1	1ª	16th	Round of 16
1970–71	2	2ª	10th	Round of 32
1971–72	2	2ª	11th	Round of 16
1972–73	2	2ª	18th	Fourth round
1973–74	3	3ª	3rd	Second round
1974–75	3	3ª	7th	Second round
1975–76	3	3ª	1st	Second round
1976–77	2	2ª	17th	Third round
1977–78	3	2ª B	7th	First round
1978–79	3	2ª B	16th	First round
1979–80	3	2ª B	13th	Third round
1980–81	3	2ª B	18th	
1981–82	4	3ª	1st	

Season	Tier	Division	Place	Copa del Rey
1982–83	4	3ª	1st	Second round
1983–84	4	3ª	1st	First round
1984–85	3	2ª B	7th	Second round
1985–86	3	2ª B	9th	First round
1986–87	3	2ª B	6th	
1987–88	3	2ª B	5th	Second round
1988–89	3	2ª B	6th	First round
1989–90	3	2ª B	10th	
1990–91	3	2ª B	14th	Third round
1991–92	3	2ª B	9th	Second round
1992–93	3	2ª B	13th	Second round
1993–94	3	2ª B	5th	Second round
1994–95	3	2ª B	4th	
1995–96	3	2ª B	12th	First round
1996–97	3	2ª B	9th	
1997–98	3	2ª B	10th	
1998–99	3	2ª B	12th	
1999–2000	3	2ª B	7th	
2000–01	3	2ª B	14th	
2001–02	3	2ª B	4th	

Season	Tier	Division	Place	Copa del Rey
2002–03	3	2ª B	4th	Preliminary round
2003–04	3	2ª B	1st	Round of 64
2004–05	2	2ª	22nd	Round of 32
2005–06	3	2ª B	2nd	Second round
2006–07	3	2ª B	1st	First round
2007–08	3	2ª B	2nd	Round of 32
2008–09	3	2ª B	12th	First round
2009–10	3	2ª B	4th	
2010–11	3	2ª B	18th	First round
2011–12	4	3ª	4th	
2012–13	4	3ª	5th	
2013–14	4	3ª	4th	
2014–15	4	3ª	1st	
2015–16	3	2ª B	9th	First round
2016–17	3	2ª B	4th	
2017–18	3	2ª B	14th	First round
2018–19	3	2ª B	6th	
2019–20	3	2ª B	9th	First round
2020–21	3	2ª B	7th / 3rd	Second round
2021–22	4	2ª RFEF	1st	

Season	Tier	Division	Place	Copa del Rey
2022–23	3	1ª Fed.	19th	Round of 32
2023–24	4	2ª Fed.	2nd	
2024–25	4	2ª Fed.	1st	Round of 16
2025–26	3	1ª Fed.	6th	Second round
2026–27	3	1ª Fed.		TBD

- 6 seasons in La Liga
- 9 seasons in Segunda División
- 3 seasons in Primera Federación
- 36 seasons in Segunda División B
- 3 seasons in Segunda Federación/Segunda División RFEF
- 26 seasons in Tercera División (19 on third level)
- 2 seasons in Categorías Regionales

== Current squad ==
As of 4 November 2026.

Note: Flags indicate national team as defined under FIFA eligibility rules; some limited exceptions apply. Players may hold more than one non-FIFA nationality.

No.	Pos.	Nation	Player
1	GK	ESP	Raúl Marqueta
2	DF	ESP	Adrián Argos
3	FW	SEN	Papa Gaye
4	DF	ESP	Juanra
5	DF	ESP	Álvaro Pérez
6	MF	ESP	Iker Ivorra
7	FW	ESP	Álex González
8	MF	CPV	Jerin Ramos
9	FW	GEQ	Domingo Mba
10	MF	ESP	Yelko Pino
11	FW	ESP	Iñaki Elejalde
13	GK	ESP	Iker Galindo

No.	Pos.	Nation	Player
14	MF	ESP	Luisao Macías
15	DF	ESP	David Alba
16	MF	ESP	Ander Vidorreta
17	FW	ESP	Alberto Gil
18	DF	MAR	Reda Ergouai
19	FW	ITA	Bob Omoregbe (on loan from Torreense)
20	DF	POR	Rui Pedro
21	MF	ESP	Ilias Charid
22	FW	ESP	Alex Comparada
23	MF	ESP	Marcos Bravo
24	MF	ESP	Tiago Rodríguez

=== Reserve team ===
Note: Flags indicate national team as defined under FIFA eligibility rules; some limited exceptions apply. Players may hold more than one non-FIFA nationality.

No.	Pos.	Nation	Player
27	MF	ESP	Gabri Vázquez
32	FW	ESP	Fer Iglesias

No.	Pos.	Nation	Player
33	MF	ESP	Oute

== Honours/achievements ==
- Segunda División: 1962–63, 1964–65
- Segunda División B: 2003–04, 2006–07
- Segunda Federación: 2021-22, 2024–25
- Tercera División: 1946–47, 1947–48, 1959–60, 1975–76, 1981–82, 1982–83, 1983–84, 2014–15
- Copa Federación de España: 2007, 2018
- Best results in La Liga: 7th in 1965–66, 8th in 1967–68

== Colours and crest ==
The traditional colours of Pontevedra are burgundy shirt, blue shorts and burgundy socks. However, during certain periods white shorts and blue socks were also used, and even a blue and burgundy ribboned shirt for a short period of time.

The current colours are the traditional, with the crest of the club on the left upper part of the shirt. The name of the sponsor (if any) is normally placed in the centre of the shirt.

The crest is a fusion between the coat of arms of the city of Pontevedra and a football, displaying the name of the city/club and the letters "CF". The club has an official mascot called Roélio, a walking bone dressed in the club colours who is a direct reference to the club's motto.

== Stadium ==
Pontevedra plays at the Estadio Municipal de Pasarón. With a 105x68 meters playing field, it was built in 1956 and was partially refitted for the 1982 FIFA World Cup celebrated in Spain; it did not hold any actual games in the tournament, but it benefitted from the general funds allocated to the refurbishment of football stadiums.

The stadium used to have a capacity for 16,500, including standing spectators. However, UEFA regulations dictated that all attendants must be seated and, therefore, the stadium went under re-construction. – regardless, Pasarón was also in need of a general refurbishment, overdue since 1982. The works were completed for the 2010–11 season, with the new capacity being of 10,500 spectators.

Pasarón is located in the north side of the city (north to Lérez River), at Rúa de Luis Otero s/n, 36005. The stadium is owned by the local city council, the Concello de Pontevedra.

== Famous players ==
- (Argentina) Fernando D'Amico
- (Argentina) Adrián Gómez
- (Brazil) Charles
- (Brazil) Igor
- (Brazil) Oseas
- (Brazil) Yuri
- (Cape Verde) Nené
- (Equatorial Guinea) Sergio Barila
- (Spain) Diego Castro
- (Spain) Fran Rico
- (Spain) Pablo Suarez
- (Spain) José Antonio Irulegui
- (Spain) Óscar Téllez
- (Uruguay) Edgardo Adinolfi
- (Venezuela) Jonay Hernández
- (Venezuela) José Manuel Rey

== See also ==
- Pontevedra CF B, the reserve team.
