= Eiriña CF =

Football club in Spain active between 1922 and 1941

- Full name: Eiriña Club de Fútbol
- Short name: Eiriña CF
- Founded: 1922
- Dissolved: 16 October 1941
- Ground: Campo do Progreso
- 1940–41: Serie A – South, withdrew

The Eiriña Club de Fútbol was a Spanish football club located in Pontevedra, Galicia, founded in 1922, and disappeared on 16 October 1941, when it merged with the Alfonso XIII CF to form the Pontevedra CF.

== History ==
=== Origins ===
In 1921, the modest Lérez FC, encouraged by the Álvarez Limeses and the son of the Marquis of Riestra, wanted to grow, so it changed location and colors to become Eiriña FC, which became the best club in the prehistory of the Pontevedra football. Some of the members of Lérez FC were Antón Losada, Alexandre Bóveda, and Alfonso Rodríguez Castelao. The first references to Lérez FC date back to 1909, which played its games in A Xunqueira do Cobo.

=== Golden age ===
The Eiriña Club de Fútbol was founded in 1922, taking its name from the A Eiriña neighborhood, and which wore a striped yellow and black jersey with black pants. Together with Alfonso XIII CF and the Pontevedra Athletic Club, Eiriña became one of the three most important clubs in the city in the early 1920s, competing in the Regional Championship of Galicia until 1926, when Pontevedra AC disappeared following a decline thanks largely to the arrival of professionalism.

The other two, Eiriña FC from Campo de Pasarón and Alfonso XIII FC from Campo de Burgo, managed to survive due to their youth and organization. In April 1931, the Spanish Second Republic was established and the Alfonsista club was forced to change its name, becoming known as Pontevedra Sport Club, continuing to compete until the arrival of the Spanish Civil War; while Eiriña FC became the main club in the city, proclaiming itself Champion of Serie B in 1923 and playing in the first Category since then. The team's greatest achievement was competing in Spain's Tercera División in consecutive seasons (1929–30, 1931–32, and 1932–33). The club then won the Galicia Amateur Championships in the 1932–33 and 1933–34, before being proclaimed Champion of the inaugural Copa Galicia in 1936, beating Deportivo de La Coruña 6–4 on aggregate in the final. With the arrival of the Civil War, all regional competitions were paralyzed and football activity gradually decreased, but not before Eiriña participated in the First Category of the South Championship where they placed fifth. In the 1937–38 season, the club participated in the Galician Championship, called the Galician Army Corps Cup, where it finished fourth and last classified.

=== Decline and collapse ===
When the war ended, both Eiriña and Pontevedra SC remained active, but the great sporting and human burden made the development of both in a different panorama almost unfeasible, so the directors decided to meet and study a way out of this situation, resulting in the merger of both into a single entity that was capable of representing the city with the proper support. Thus, on 16 October 1941, the Pontevedra Club de Fútbol was established and its first president was Fernando Ponte Conde.

== Season to season ==
Season	Tier	Division	Place	Copa del Rey
1928–29	4	Serie A	4th	
1929–30	3	3ª	3rd	
1930–31	4	Serie A	4th	
1931–32	3	3ª	2nd	
1932–33	3	3ª	3rd	
1933–34	4	Serie A	6th	
1934–35	4	Serie A	4th	
1935–36	4	Serie A	6th	
1939–40	4	Serie A	4th	
1940–41	4	Serie A	(R)	

- 2 seasons in Tercera División

== Notable players ==
- Daniel Díaz de León

== Honours ==
- Galician Championship of Serie B:
  - Champions (1): 1922–23
- Regional Championship of Galicia:
  - Champions (2): 1932–33, 1933–34
- Copa Galicia:
  - Champions (1): 1936
